= 2016 Fed Cup Europe/Africa Zone =

Subsection of tennis competition

The Europe/Africa Zone is one of three zones of regional competition in the 2016 Fed Cup.

== Group I ==
- Venue: Municipal Tennis Centre, Eilat, Israel (outdoor hard)
- Date: 3–6 February

The fourteen teams were divided into two pools of three teams and two pools of four teams. The four pool winners will take part in play-offs to determine the two nations advancing to the World Group II play-offs. The nations finishing last in their pools will take part in relegation play-offs, with the two losing nations being relegated to Group II for 2017.

=== Pools ===
	Pool A	UKR	POR	SWE
1	Ukraine (2–0)		3–0	3–0
2	Portugal (1–1)	0–3		2–1
3	Sweden (0–2)	0–3	1–2	

	Pool B	GBR	GEO	RSA
1	Great Britain (2–0)		2–1	3–0
2	Georgia (1–1)	1–2		3–0
3	South Africa (0–2)	0–3	0–3	

	Pool C	ISR	CRO	EST	TUR
1	Israel (2–1)		2–1	3–0	1–2
2	Croatia (2–1)	1–2		2–1	2–1
3	Estonia (1–2)	0–3	1–2		2–1
4	Turkey (1–2)	2–1	1–2	1–2	

	Pool D	BEL	BUL	LAT	HUN
1	Belgium (3–0)		3–0	3–0	3–0
2	Bulgaria (2–1)	0–3		2–1	2–1
3	Latvia (1–2)	0–3	1–2		2–1
4	Hungary (0–3)	0–3	1–2	1–2	

=== Play-offs ===
Placing	A Team	Score	C Team
Promotional	Ukraine	3–0	Israel
5th–8th	Portugal	0–2	Croatia
9th–10th	—		Estonia
Relegation	Sweden	0–2	Turkey

Placing	B Team	Score	D Team
Promotional	Great Britain	0–2	Belgium
5th–8th	Georgia	2–1	Bulgaria
9th–10th	—		Latvia
Relegation	South Africa	0–2	Hungary

=== Final placements ===
Placing	Teams	
Promoted/First	Ukraine	Belgium
Third	Israel	Great Britain
Fifth	Croatia	Georgia
Seventh	Portugal	Bulgaria
Ninth	Estonia	Latvia
Eleventh	Turkey	Hungary
Relegated/Thirteenth	Sweden	South Africa

- Belgium and Ukraine were promoted to 2016 Fed Cup World Group II Play-offs
- South Africa and Sweden were relegated to Europe/Africa Zone Group II in 2017

== Group II ==
- Venue: Gezira Sporting Club, Cairo, Egypt (outdoor clay)
- Dates: 13–16 April

The seven teams will be divided into two pools, one of three teams and one of four teams. The two nations placing first and second will take part in play-offs to determine the two nations advancing to Group I. The nations finishing last in their pools will take part in relegation play-offs, with the two losing nations being relegated to Group III for 2017. Slovenia chose to withdraw due to security concerns.

=== Pools ===
	Pool A	DEN	LTU	FIN
1	Denmark (2–0)		3–0	3–0
2	Lithuania (1–1)	0–3		2–1
3	Finland (0–2)	0–3	1–2	

	Pool B	AUT	BIH	EGY	LIE
1	Austria (2–1)		2–1	3–0	0–3
2	Bosnia and Herzegovina (2–1)	1–2		3–0	2–1
3	Egypt (1–2)	0–3	0–3		2–1
4	Liechtenstein (1–2)	3–0	1–2	1–2	

=== Play-offs ===
Placing	A Team	Score	B Team
Promotional	Denmark	1–2	Bosnia and Herzegovina
Promotional	Lithuania	0–2	Austria
Relegation	Finland	0–2	Egypt
Relegation	—		Liechtenstein

=== Final placements ===
Placing	Teams	
Promoted/First	Austria	Bosnia and Herzegovina
Third	Denmark	Lithuania
Fifth	Egypt	
Relegated/Seventh	Liechtenstein	Finland

- Austria and Bosnia and Herzegovina were promoted to Europe/Africa Zone Group I in 2017
- Liechtenstein and Finland were relegated to Europe/Africa Zone Group III in 2017

== Group III ==
- Venue: Bellevue, Ulcinj, Montenegro (outdoor clay)
- Dates: 11–16 April

The seventeen teams will be divided into three pools of four teams and one pool of five teams. The four pool winners will take part in play-offs to determine the two nations advancing to Group II for 2017.

=== Pools ===
	Pool A	LUX	GRE	TUN	MLT
1	Luxembourg (3–0)		2–1	2–1	3–0
2	Greece (2–1)	1–2		2–1	3–0
3	Tunisia (1–2)	1–2	1–2		3–0
4	Malta (0–3)	0–3	0–3	0–3	

	Pool B	MKD	IRL	ARM	ISL
1	Macedonia (3–0)		2–1	2–1	3–0
2	Ireland (2–1)	1–2		2–1	3–0
3	Armenia (1–2)	1–2	1–2		3–0
4	Iceland (0–3)	0–3	0–3	0–3	

	Pool C	MDA	MAD	CYP	ALG
1	Moldova (2–1)		1–2	2–1	3–0
2	Madagascar (2–1)	2–1		1–2	3–0
3	Cyprus (2–1)	1–2	2–1		2–1
4	Algeria (0–3)	0–3	0–3	1–2	

	Pool D	NOR	MNE	MAR	KOS	MOZ
1	Norway (4–0)		2–1	3–0	3–0	3–0
2	Montenegro (3–1)	1–2		2–1	3–0	3–0
3	Morocco (2–2)	0–3	1–2		2–1	3–0
4	Kosovo (1–3)	0–3	0–3	1–2		3–0
5	Mozambique (0–4)	0–3	0–3	0–3	0–3	

=== Play-offs ===
Placing	A Team	Score	C Team
Promotional	Luxembourg	2–0	Moldova
5th–8th	Greece	2–0	Madagascar
9th–12th	Tunisia	2–0	Cyprus
13th–16th	Malta	0–2	Algeria

Placing	B Team	Score	D Team
Promotional	Macedonia	0–2	Norway
5th–8th	Ireland	0–2	Montenegro
9th–12th	Armenia	2–1	Morocco
13th–16th	Iceland	1–2	Kosovo
17th	—		Mozambique

=== Final placements ===
Placing	Teams	
Promoted/First	Luxembourg	Norway
Third	Moldova	Macedonia
Fifth	Greece	Montenegro
Seventh	Madagascar	Ireland
Ninth	Tunisia	Armenia
Eleventh	Cyprus	Morocco
Thirteenth	Algeria	Kosovo
Fifteenth	Malta	Iceland
Seventeenth	Mozambique	

- Luxembourg and Norway were promoted to Europe/Africa Zone Group II in 2017
