= 2018 Fed Cup World Group play-offs =

Part of tennis tournament

The World Group I play-offs were four ties which involved the losing nations of the World Group and the winning nations of the World Group II. Nations that won their play-off ties entered the 2019 World Group, while losing nations joined the 2019 World Group II.

Participating Teams
Australia	Belarus	Belgium	Italy
Netherlands	Romania	Slovakia	Switzerland

== Belarus vs. Slovakia ==
Belarus
3
Chizhovka-Arena, Minsk, Belarus
21–22 April
Hard (indoor)

Slovakia
2

			1	2	3
1	(Belarus) (Slovakia)	Aliaksandra Sasnovich; Jana Čepelová	7^{8} 6^{6}	7; 5
2	(Belarus) (Slovakia)	Aryna Sabalenka; Viktória Kužmová	2; 6	6; 2	6^{5} 7^{7}
3	(Belarus) (Slovakia)	Aryna Sabalenka; Anna Karolína Schmiedlová	6; 3	6; 4
4	(Belarus) (Slovakia)	Aliaksandra Sasnovich; Viktória Kužmová	1; 6	6^{3} 7^{7}
5	(Belarus) (Slovakia)	Vera Lapko / Lidziya Marozava; Viktória Kužmová / Anna Karolína Schmiedlová	6; 3	6; 4

== Romania vs. Switzerland ==
Romania
3
BT Arena, Cluj-Napoca, Romania
21–22 April
Clay (indoor)

Switzerland
1

			1	2	3
1	(Romania) (Switzerland)	Simona Halep; Viktorija Golubic	6; 3	1; 6	6; 1
2	(Romania) (Switzerland)	Irina-Camelia Begu; Timea Bacsinszky	6; 4	6; 1
3	(Romania) (Switzerland)	Simona Halep; Patty Schnyder	6; 2	6; 1
4	(Romania) (Switzerland)	Irina-Camelia Begu; Viktorija Golubic				not played
5	(Romania) (Switzerland)	Mihaela Buzărnescu / Sorana Cîrstea; Viktorija Golubic / Jil Teichmann	6; 0	0; 6	[6] [10]

== Australia vs. Netherlands ==
Australia
4
WIN Entertainment Centre, Wollongong, Australia
21–22 April
Hard (indoor)

Netherlands
1

			1	2	3
1	(Australia) (Netherlands)	Samantha Stosur; Lesley Kerkhove	5; 7	6^{1} 7^{7}
2	(Australia) (Netherlands)	Ashleigh Barty; Quirine Lemoine	6; 0	6; 2
3	(Australia) (Netherlands)	Ashleigh Barty; Lesley Kerkhove	6; 4	6; 2
4	(Australia) (Netherlands)	Daria Gavrilova; Quirine Lemoine	6; 3	6; 2
5	(Australia) (Netherlands)	Destanee Aiava / Daria Gavrilova; Lesley Kerkhove / Demi Schuurs	6; 3	6; 2

== Italy vs. Belgium ==
Italy
0
Valletta Cambiaso ASD, Genoa, Italy
21–22 April
Clay

Belgium
4

			1	2	3
1	(Italy) (Belgium)	Jasmine Paolini; Elise Mertens	1; 6	5; 7
2	(Italy) (Belgium)	Sara Errani; Alison Van Uytvanck	4; 6	7^{8} 6^{6}	2; 6
3	(Italy) (Belgium)	Sara Errani; Elise Mertens	3; 6	1; 6
4	(Italy) (Belgium)	Jasmine Paolini; Alison Van Uytvanck				not played
5	(Italy) (Belgium)	Deborah Chiesa / Jasmine Paolini; Kirsten Flipkens / Elise Mertens	1; 6	4; 6
