= Belarus Billie Jean King Cup team =

Belarusian national women's tennis team

Belarus
- Captain: Tatiana Poutchek
- ITF ranking: 6 (22 March 2022) (suspended)
- Highest ITF ranking: 2 (24 April 2017)
- Colors: red & green
- First year: 1994
- Years played: 26
- Ties played (W–L): 103 (72–31)
- Years in World Group: 7 (5–6)
- Best finish: World Group F (2017)
- Most total wins: Tatiana Poutchek (37–15)
- Most singles wins: Natalia Zvereva (24–7)
- Most doubles wins: Tatiana Poutchek (28–7)
- Best doubles team: Darya Kustova / Tatiana Poutchek (7–0)
- Most ties played: Tatiana Poutchek (45)
- Most years played: Tatiana Poutchek (15)

The Belarus women's national tennis team represented Belarus in Billie Jean King Cup tennis competition and are governed by the Belarus Tennis Association. They compete in the World Group. After the Russian invasion of Ukraine, the International Tennis Federation suspended Russia and Belarus from Billie Jean King Cup competitions.

== History ==
=== 1994–2010: Early years ===
Prior to 1993, Belarusian players competed for the Soviet Union. Belarus competed in its first Fed Cup as an independent nation in 1994, when they achieved their best result by reaching the World Group 1st Round. For the next three years, the team competed in Europe/Africa Zonal Group I. In 1999, Belarus defeated Venezuela to reach World Group II. After spending one year at that level, the team was relegated to Europe/Africa Zonal Group I once again.

Belarus spent another four years at the Europe Arica Zonal Group I before reaching a World Group Play-off in 2004, where they lost to Slovakia in what was their last opportunity for promotion from the zonal level until 2011.

=== 2011–2017: Resurgence and World Group Final ===
With the help of four players ranked in the WTA top-200 at the end of 2010, Belarus defeated Estonia to return to World Group II, before immediately suffering back-to-back losses to the United States and Switzerland and being once again relegated to Europe/Africa Zonal Group I play. After several years competing at that level, the team was promoted to World Group II by defeating Japan in 2015.

Belarus defeated Canada in their 2016 World Group II tie. This victory secured a spot in the 2016 World Group play-offs, where they upset Russia 3–2. Belarus competed in the 2017 Fed Cup World Group, where they scored upsets against Netherlands in the quarterfinals and Switzerland in the semifinals. Belarus hosted the 2017 Fed Cup Final against the United States, which they lost 3–2.

=== 2022: Suspension ===
After the Russian invasion of Ukraine, the International Tennis Federation suspended Russia and Belarus from Billie Jean King Cup competitions.

== Current team ==
Most recent year-end rankings are used.

Name	Born	First	Last		Ties	Win/Loss			Ranks	
Name	Born	First	Year	Tie	Ties	Sin	Dou	Tot	Sin	Dou
Victoria Azarenka	July 31, 1989	2005	2019	Australia	21	17–5	6–2	23–7	50	18
Olga Govortsova	August 23, 1988	2008	2017	Switzerland	31	20–10	6–3	26–13	187	172
Lidziya Marozava	October 8, 1992	2013	2019	Germany	6	0–1	3–2	3–3	1125	91
Aryna Sabalenka	May 5, 1998	2016	2020	Netherlands	9	10–6	1–4	11–10	13	5
Aliaksandra Sasnovich	March 22, 1994	2012	2020	Netherlands	22	17–11	6–3	23–14	68	45

== Players ==
Key
	Still active for the national team (Note: Players considered active are the ones who have been called up for the national team in the last 12 months.)
*	Still playing active tennis

Player	W-L (Total)	W-L (Singles)	W-L (Doubles)	Ties	Career	Years
Victoria Azarenka *	23–7	17–5	6–2	21	2005–	8
Olga Barabanschikova	33–17	17–3	16–4	35	1996–2003	8
Ima Bohush	2–1	0–1	2–0	3	2008	1
Ekaterina Dzehalevich	8–6	2–6	6–0	10	2005–2010	4
Olga Glouschenko	1–0	0–0	1–0	1	1996	1
Olga Govortsova	26–13	20–10	6–3	31	2008–	9
Tatiana Ignatieva	13–11	5–7	8–4	16	1994–1997	4
Ilona Kremen *	4–4	2–2	2–2	7	2013–	5
Darya Kustova	11–4	3–3	8–1	12	2004–2012	11
Vera Lapko *	5–2	0–1	5–1	7	2015–	3
Darya Lebesheva *	0–1	0–0	0–1	4	2012	1
Lidziya Marozava *	3–3	0–1	3–2	6	2013–	3
Ksenia Milevskaya	4–1	2–0	2–1	4	2007	1
Nadejda Ostrovskaya	13–9	6–5	7–4	19	1998–2003	6
Tatiana Poutchek	37–15	9–8	28–7	45	1997–2009	15
Aryna Sabalenka *	11–10	10–6	1–4	9	2016–	5
Aliaksandra Sasnovich *	23–15	17–11	6–4	22	2012–	9
Iryna Shymanovich *	2–1	0–0	2–1	3	2014	1
Marina Stets	0–4	0–0	0–4	4	1994–1995	2
Tatsiana Uvarova	3–1	3–1	0–0	4	2004	1
Anastasia Yakimova	10–13	4–11	6–2	17	2004–2012	5
Elena Yaryshka	0–1	0–0	0–1	1	2001	1
Vera Zhukovets	0–4	0–0	0–4	4	1994–1995	2
Natalia Zvereva	35–11	24–7	11–4	32	1994–2002	7

== Captains ==
- Simon Kagan (1994)
- Marat Zverev (1995–1998)
- Natalia Zvereva (1999)
- Igor Tikhonko (2000)
- Anatoli Yakauleu (2001–2002)
- Simon Kagan (2003)
- Yuri Scherbakou (2004)
- Dmitri Tatur (2005–2008)
- Natalia Zvereva (2009)
- Vladimir Voltchkov (2010)
- Sergei Teterin (2011)
- Alexander Skrypko (2012)
- Tatiana Poutchek (2013–2015)
- Eduard Dubrou (2016–2018)
- Tatiana Poutchek (2018–present)

== Results ==
=== 1994-2019 ===
Tournament	1994	1995	1996	1997	1998	1999	2000	2001	2002	2003	2004	2005	2006	2007	2008	2009	2010	2011	2012	2013	2014	2015	2016	2017	2018	2019	W–L
Fed Cup
World Group	1R	A	A	A	A	A	A	A	A	A	A	A	A	A	A	A	A	A	A	A	A	A	A	F	1R	SF	3–4
World Group play-offs	NH	A	A	A	A	A	NH	A	A	A	A	A	A	A	A	A	A	A	A	A	A	A	W	A	W	A	2–0
World Group II	NH	A	A	A	A	L	Not Held					A	A	A	A	A	A	A	L	A	A	A	W	A	A	A	1–2
World Group II play-offs	NH	A	A	A	W	1R	Not Held				L	A	A	A	A	A	A	W	L	A	A	W	A	A	A	A	5–3
Europe/Africa Group I	W	F	F	F	W	A	SF	1R	1R	F	W	F	1R	5th	7th	F	9th	W	A	7th	F	W	A	A	A	A	60–22
Win–loss	4–1	3–1	3–2	4–1	6–0	2–2	4–1	2–1	1–2	2–2	3–1	3–1	2–2	3–1	2–2	3–1	2–2	5–0	0–2	2–2	3–1	5–0	2–0	2–1	1–1	1–1	71–31
Year End Ranking									32	34	23	22	23	24	28	24	26	14	17	22	24	15	8	3	3	5	

=== 2020-present ===
Tournament	2020	2021	2022	2023	2024	W–L
Billie Jean King Cup
Finals	P	GS	A	A	A	0–2
Qualifying round	W	NH	A	A	A	1–0
Play-offs	P	A	A	A	A	0–0
Europe/Africa Group I	A	NH	A	A	A	0–0
Win–loss	1–0	0–2	0–0	0–0	0–0	72–33
Year End Ranking	N/A	6	N/A	N/A	N/A	

=== By decade ===
Here is the list of all match-ups since 1994, when Belarus started competing as a separate nation.

==== 1994–1999 ====
Year	Competition	Date	Location	Opponent	Score	Result
1994	Europe/Africa Zone, Group G, Round Robin	19 April	Bad Waltersdorf (AUT)	Israel	3–0	Won
1994	Europe/Africa Zone, Group G, Round Robin	20 April	Bad Waltersdorf (AUT)	Egypt	2–1	Won
1994	Europe/Africa Zone, Semifinal	22 April	Bad Waltersdorf (AUT)	Portugal	2–1	Won
1994	Europe/Africa Zone, Final	23 April	Bad Waltersdorf (AUT)	Romania	2–1	Won
1994	World Group, 1st Round	18–19 July	Frankfurt (GER)	Netherlands	1–2	Lost
1995	Europe/Africa Zone, Group I/C, Round Robin	17 April	Murcia (ESP)	Finland	2–1	Won
1995	Europe/Africa Zone, Group I/C, Round Robin	18 April	Murcia (ESP)	Latvia	2–1	Won
1995	Europe/Africa Zone, Group I/C, Round Robin	19 April	Murcia (ESP)	Switzerland	2–1	Won
1995	Europe/Africa Zone, Semifinal	20 April	Murcia (ESP)	Russia	2–1	Won
1995	Europe/Africa Zone, Final	21 April	Murcia (ESP)	Czech Republic	0–3	Lost
1996	Europe/Africa Zone, Group I/A, Round Robin	22 April	Murcia (ESP)	Great Britain	2–1	Won
1996	Europe/Africa Zone, Group I/A, Round Robin	23 April	Murcia (ESP)	Slovenia	0–3	Lost
1996	Europe/Africa Zone, Group I/A, Round Robin	24 April	Murcia (ESP)	Russia	2–1	Won
1996	Europe/Africa Zone, Semifinal	25 April	Murcia (ESP)	Italy	3–0	Won
1996	Europe/Africa Zone, Final	26 April	Murcia (ESP)	Croatia	1–2	Lost
1997	Europe/Africa Zone, Group I/C, Round Robin	22 April	Bari (ITA)	Finland	3–0	Won
1997	Europe/Africa Zone, Group I/C, Round Robin	23 April	Bari (ITA)	Poland	3–0	Won
1997	Europe/Africa Zone, Group I/C, Round Robin	24 April	Bari (ITA)	Hungary	2–1	Won
1997	Europe/Africa Zone, Semifinal	25 April	Bari (ITA)	Sweden	2–1	Won
1997	Europe/Africa Zone, Final	26 April	Bari (ITA)	Russia	0–3	Lost
1998	Europe/Africa Zone, Group I/A, Round Robin	14 April	Murcia (ESP)	Slovenia	3–0	Won
1998	Europe/Africa Zone, Group I/A, Round Robin	15 April	Murcia (ESP)	Israel	2–1	Won
1998	Europe/Africa Zone, Group I/A, Round Robin	16 April	Murcia (ESP)	Greece	2–1	Won
1998	Europe/Africa Zone, Semifinal	17 April	Murcia (ESP)	Ukraine	2–1	Won
1998	Europe/Africa Zone, Final	18 April	Murcia (ESP)	South Africa	2–0	Won
1998	World Group II, Play-off	25–26 July	Minsk (BLR)	Venezuela	4–1	Won
1999	World Group II, first round	17–18 April	Minsk (BLR)	Czech Republic	1–4	Lost
1999	World Group II, Play-off Group A, Round Robin	21 July	Amsterdam (NED)	Slovenia	3–0	Won
1999	World Group II, Play-off Group A, Round Robin	22 July	Amsterdam (NED)	Netherlands	0–3	Lost
1999	World Group II, Play-off Group A, Round Robin	23 July	Amsterdam (NED)	Japan	2–0	Won

==== 2000–2009 ====
Year	Competition	Date	Location	Opponent	Score	Result
2000	Europe/Africa Zone, Group I/A, Round Robin	15 May	Murcia (ESP)	Poland	3–0	Won
2000	Europe/Africa Zone, Group I/A, Round Robin	16 May	Murcia (ESP)	Morocco	3–0	Won
2000	Europe/Africa Zone, Group I/A, Round Robin	17 May	Murcia (ESP)	Romania	3–0	Won
2000	Europe/Africa Zone, Group I/A, Round Robin	18 May	Murcia (ESP)	Slovenia	2–1	Won
2000	Europe/Africa Zone, Semifinal	20 May	Murcia (ESP)	Hungary	0–2	Lost
2001	Europe/Africa Zone, Group I/A, Round Robin	24 May	Murcia (ESP)	Romania	2–1	Won
2001	Europe/Africa Zone, Group I/A, Round Robin	25 May	Murcia (ESP)	Sweden	0–3	Lost
2001	Europe/Africa Zone, Group I/A, Round Robin	26 May	Murcia (ESP)	Great Britain	2–1	Won
2002	Europe/Africa Zone, Group I/B, Round Robin	24 April	Antalya (TUR)	Greece	1–2	Lost
2002	Europe/Africa Zone, Group I/B, Round Robin	25 April	Antalya (TUR)	Ukraine	2–1	Won
2002	Europe/Africa Zone, Group I/B, Round Robin	26 April	Antalya (TUR)	Israel	1–2	Lost
2003	Europe/Africa Zone, Group I/D, Round Robin	21 April	Estoril (POR)	Luxembourg	2–1	Won
2003	Europe/Africa Zone, Group I/D, Round Robin	23 April	Estoril (POR)	Estonia	3–0	Won
2003	Europe/Africa Zone, Group I/D, Round Robin	24 April	Estoril (POR)	Switzerland	0–2	Lost
2003	Europe/Africa Zone, Promotional Play-Offs	26 April	Estoril (POR)	Israel	1–2	Lost
2004	Europe/Africa Zone, Group I/B, Round Robin	19 April	Antalya (TUR)	Denmark	3–0	Won
2004	Europe/Africa Zone, Group I/B, Round Robin	22 April	Antalya (TUR)	Hungary	3–0	Won
2004	Europe/Africa Zone, Promotional Play-Offs	23 April	Antalya (TUR)	Sweden	2–1	Won
2004	World Group II, Play-off	10–11 July	Bratislava (SVK)	Slovakia	0–4	Lost
2005	Europe/Africa Zone, Group I/D, Round Robin	20 April	Antalya (TUR)	Israel	2–1	Won
2005	Europe/Africa Zone, Group I/D, Round Robin	21 April	Antalya (TUR)	Ukraine	2–1	Won
2005	Europe/Africa Zone, Group I/D, Round Robin	22 April	Antalya (TUR)	Greece	3–0	Won
2005	Europe/Africa Zone, Promotional Play-Offs	23 April	Antalya (TUR)	Slovenia	1–2	Lost
2006	Europe/Africa Zone, Group I/D, Round Robin	17 April	Plovdiv (BUL)	Estonia	2–1	Won
2006	Europe/Africa Zone, Group I/D, Round Robin	18 April	Plovdiv (BUL)	Romania	1–2	Lost
2006	Europe/Africa Zone, Group I/D, Round Robin	19 April	Plovdiv (BUL)	Sweden	2–1	Won
2006	Europe/Africa Zone, Group I/D, Round Robin	20 April	Plovdiv (BUL)	Israel	0–2	Lost
2007	Europe/Africa Zone, Group I/B, Round Robin	18 April	Plovdiv (BUL)	Hungary	2–1	Won
2007	Europe/Africa Zone, Group I/B, Round Robin	19 April	Plovdiv (BUL)	Lithuania	2–1	Won
2007	Europe/Africa Zone, Group I/B, Round Robin	20 April	Plovdiv (BUL)	Ukraine	0–3	Lost
2007	Europe/Africa Zone, 5th to 8th play-offs	21 April	Plovdiv (BUL)	Luxembourg	2–1	Won
2008	Europe/Africa Zone, Group I/C, Round Robin	30 January	Budapest (HUN)	Georgia	3–0	Won
2008	Europe/Africa Zone, Group I/C, Round Robin	31 January	Budapest (HUN)	Slovenia	3–0	Won
2008	Europe/Africa Zone, Group I/C, Round Robin	1 February	Budapest (HUN)	Sweden	1–2	Lost
2008	Europe/Africa Zone, 5th to 8th play-offs	2 February	Budapest (HUN)	Romania	0–2	Lost
2009	Europe/Africa Zone, Group I/C, Round Robin	4 February	Tallinn (EST)	Denmark	2–1	Won
2009	Europe/Africa Zone, Group I/C, Round Robin	5 February	Tallinn (EST)	Slovenia	3–0	Won
2009	Europe/Africa Zone, Group I/C, Round Robin	6 February	Tallinn (EST)	Austria	3–0	Won
2009	Europe/Africa Zone, Promotional Play-off	7 February	Tallinn (EST)	Estonia	0–2	Lost

==== 2010–2021 ====
Year	Competition	Date	Location	Opponent	Score	Result
2010	Europe/Africa Zone, Group I/D, Round Robin	3 February	Lisbon (POR)	Austria	1–2	Lost
2010	Europe/Africa Zone, Group I/D, Round Robin	4 February	Lisbon (POR)	Bosnia and Herzegovina	3–0	Won
2010	Europe/Africa Zone, Group I/D, Round Robin	5 February	Lisbon (POR)	Great Britain	1–2	Lost
2010	Europe/Africa Zone, 9th to 12th play-offs	6 February	Lisbon (POR)	Croatia	2–1	Won
2011	Europe/Africa Zone, Group I/C, Round Robin	2 February	Eilat (ISR)	Austria	3–0	Won
2011	Europe/Africa Zone, Group I/C, Round Robin	3 February	Eilat (ISR)	Croatia	3–0	Won
2011	Europe/Africa Zone, Group I/C, Round Robin	4 February	Eilat (ISR)	Greece	3–0	Won
2011	Europe/Africa Zone, Promotional Play-off	5 February	Eilat (ISR)	Poland	2–0	Won
2011	World Group II, Play-off	16–17 April	Minsk (BLR)	Estonia	5–0	Won
2012	World Group II, First round	4–5 February	Worcester (USA)	United States	0–5	Lost
2012	World Group II, Play-off	21–22 April	Yverdon-les-Bains (SUI)	Switzerland	1–4	Lost
2013	Europe/Africa Zone, Group I/A, Round robin	6 February	Eilat (ISR)	Georgia	3–0	Won
2013	Europe/Africa Zone, Group I/A, Round robin	7 February	Eilat (ISR)	Austria	2–1	Won
2013	Europe/Africa Zone, Group I/A, Round robin	8 February	Eilat (ISR)	Croatia	0–3	Lost
2013	Europe/Africa Zone, 5th to 8th play-offs	10 February	Eilat (ISR)	Israel	0–2	Lost
2014	Europe/Africa Zone, Group I/D, Round robin	4 February	Budapest (HUN)	Turkey	3–0	Won
2014	Europe/Africa Zone, Group I/D, Round robin	6 February	Budapest (HUN)	Portugal	3–0	Won
2014	Europe/Africa Zone, Group I/D, Round robin	7 February	Budapest (HUN)	Bulgaria	2–1	Won
2014	Europe/Africa Zone, Promotional play-off	9 February	Budapest (HUN)	Netherlands	0–2	Lost
2015	Europe/Africa Zone, Group I/A, Round robin	4 February	Budapest (HUN)	Georgia	3–0	Won
2015	Europe/Africa Zone, Group I/A, Round robin	5 February	Budapest (HUN)	Bulgaria	3–0	Won
2015	Europe/Africa Zone, Group I/A, Round robin	6 February	Budapest (HUN)	Portugal	2–1	Won
2015	Europe/Africa Zone, Promotional play-off	7 February	Budapest (HUN)	Great Britain	2–0	Won
2015	World Group II, Play-off	18–19 April	Tokyo (JPN)	Japan	3–2	Won
2016	World Group II, 1st Round	6–7 February	Quebec City (Canada)	Canada	3–2	Won
2016	World Group, Play-off	16–17 April	Moscow (RUS)	Russia	3–2	Won
2017	World Group, 1st Round	11–12 February	Minsk (BLR)	Netherlands	4–1	Won
2017	World Group, Semi-Finals	22–23 April	Minsk (BLR)	Switzerland	3–2	Won
2017	World Group, Final	11–12 November	Minsk (BLR)	United States	2–3	Lost
2018	World Group, 1st Round	10–11 February	Minsk (BLR)	Germany	2–3	Lost
2018	World Group, Play-off	21–22 April	Minsk (BLR)	Slovakia	3–2	Won
2019	World Group, 1st Round	9–10 February	Braunschweig (GER)	Germany	4–0	Won
2019	World Group, Semi-Finals	20–21 April	Brisbane (AUS)	Australia	2–3	Lost
2020–21	Qualifying round	7–8 February 2020	The Hague (NED)	Netherlands	3–2	Won
2020–21	Finals, Group stage	1 November 2021	Prague (CZE)	Belgium	1–2	Lost
2020–21	Finals, Group stage	4 November 2021	Prague (CZE)	Australia	1–2	Lost

== See also ==
- Billie Jean King Cup
- Belarus Davis Cup team
