= 2016 Fed Cup Europe/Africa Zone Group I – play-offs =

The play-offs of the 2016 Fed Cup Europe/Africa Zone Group I were the final stages of the Group I zonal competition involving teams from Europe and Africa. Using the positions determined in their pools, the fourteen teams faced off to determine their placing in the 2016 Fed Cup Europe/Africa Zone Group I. The top two teams advanced to World Group II play-offs, and the bottom two teams were relegated to the Europe/Africa Zone Group II.

== Pool results ==
Placing	Pool A	Pool B	Pool C	Pool D
1	Ukraine	Great Britain	Israel	Belgium
2	Portugal	Georgia	Croatia	Bulgaria
3	—N/a	—N/a	Estonia	Latvia
4	Sweden	South Africa	Turkey	Hungary

== Promotional play-offs ==
The first placed teams of each pool were drawn in head-to-head rounds. The winner of each round advanced to the World Group II play-offs.

=== Belgium vs. Great Britain ===
Belgium
2
Municipal Tennis Centre, Eilat, Israel
6 February 2016
Hard (outdoors)

Great Britain
0

			1	2	3
1	(Belgium) (United Kingdom)	Ysaline Bonaventure; Katie Swan	6; 3	3; 6	6; 3
2	(Belgium) (United Kingdom)	Alison Van Uytvanck; Heather Watson	6; 4	3; 6	6; 4
3	(Belgium) (United Kingdom)	Marie Benoît / An-Sophie Mestach; Jocelyn Rae / Anna Smith				not played

=== Ukraine vs. Israel ===
Ukraine
3
Municipal Tennis Centre, Eilat, Israel
6 February 2016
Hard (outdoors)

Israel
0

			1	2	3
1	(Ukraine) (Israel)	Kateryna Bondarenko; Shahar Pe'er	6; 1	6; 1
2	(Ukraine) (Israel)	Lesia Tsurenko; Julia Glushko	7^{7} 6^{1}	7^{7} 6^{2}
3	(Ukraine) (Israel)	Kateryna Bondarenko / Olga Savchuk; Shelly Krolitzky / Alona Pushkarevsky	6; 2	6; 2

== 5th place play-off ==
The runner-up teams from pools B and D and those from A and C competed in order to establish which two teams would place joint fifth in the final standings and which two would place joint seventh.

=== Georgia vs. Bulgaria ===
Georgia
2
Municipal Tennis Centre, Eilat, Israel
6 February 2016
Hard (outdoors)

Bulgaria
1

			1	2	3
1	(Georgia (country)) (Bulgaria)	Ekaterine Gorgodze; Dia Evtimova	0; 6	6; 4	6; 2
2	(Georgia (country)) (Bulgaria)	Sofia Shapatava; Isabella Shinikova	6; 1	6^{1} 7^{7}	4; 6
3	(Georgia (country)) (Bulgaria)	Oksana Kalashnikova / Sofia Shapatava; Elitsa Kostova / Isabella Shinikova	6; 2	4; 6	6; 4

=== Portugal vs. Croatia ===
Portugal
0
Municipal Tennis Centre, Eilat, Israel
6 February 2016
Hard (outdoors)

Croatia
2

			1	2	3
1	(Portugal) (Croatia)	Maria João Koehler; Silvia Njirić	4; 6	3; 6
2	(Portugal) (Croatia)	Michelle Larcher de Brito; Ana Konjuh	2; 6	2; 6
3	(Portugal) (Croatia)	Michelle Larcher de Brito / Inês Murta; Darija Jurak / Tena Lukas				not played

== Relegation play-offs ==
The teams placing last in each pool competed to keep their place in the Europe/Africa Zone Group I. The bottom-placed team from group A faced the bottom-placed team from Group C, whilst Group B's and Group D's bottom-placed teams faced off. The losers were relegated to the 2016 Europe/Africa Zone Group II.

=== South Africa vs. Hungary ===
South Africa
0
Municipal Tennis Centre, Eilat, Israel
6 February 2016
Hard (outdoors)

Hungary
2

			1	2	3
1	(South Africa) (Hungary)	Ilze Hattingh; Anna Bondár	0; 6	1; 6
2	(South Africa) (Hungary)	Chanel Simmonds; Réka-Luca Jani	0; 6	3; 6
3	(South Africa) (Hungary)	Michelle Sammons / Chanel Simmonds; Dalma Gálfi / Fanny Stollár				not played

=== Sweden vs. Turkey ===
Sweden
0
Municipal Tennis Centre, Eilat, Israel
6 February 2016
Hard (outdoors)

Turkey
2

			1	2	3
1	(Sweden) (Turkey)	Susanne Celik; İpek Soylu	3; 6	2; 6
2	(Sweden) (Turkey)	Rebecca Peterson; Çağla Büyükakçay	6; 2	4; 6	0; 6
3	(Sweden) (Turkey)	Jacqueline Cabaj Awad / Cornelia Lister; Çağla Büyükakçay / İpek Soylu				not played

== Final placements ==
Placing	Teams	
Promoted	Belgium	Ukraine
Third	Great Britain	Israel
Fifth	Georgia	Croatia
Seventh	Bulgaria	Portugal
Ninth	Estonia	Latvia
Eleventh	Hungary	Turkey
Relegated	South Africa	Sweden

- Belgium and Ukraine advanced to World Group II play-offs.
- South Africa and Sweden were relegated to Europe/Africa Group II in 2017.
