= 2005 Fed Cup =

International women's tennis competition

Details
- Duration: 23 April – 18 September
- Edition: 43rd

Achievements (singles)

The 2005 Fed Cup was the 43rd edition of the most important competition between national teams in women's tennis.

The final took place at Court Philippe Chatrier in Paris, France, on 17–18 September. The home team, France, lost to Russia, 2–3, giving Russia their second title, consecutively and overall, and their second win against France in a final.

== World Group ==
Participating teams
Argentina	Austria	Belgium	France
Italy	Russia	Spain	United States

=== Draw ===
Quarterfinals; 23–24 April
Brindisi, Italy (Outdoor clay)
1	Russia	4
Italy	1
Delray Beach, Florida, United States (Outdoor hard)
Belgium	0
4	United States	5
Jerez, Spain (Outdoor clay)
3	Spain	3
Argentina	2
Pörtschach, Austria (Outdoor clay)
Austria	1
2	France	4

Semifinals; 9–10 July
Moscow, Russia (Indoor clay)
1	Russia	4
4	United States	1
Aix-en-Provence, France (Outdoor hard)
3	Spain	1
2	France	3

Final; 17–18 September
Paris, France (Outdoor clay)
1	Russia	3
2	France	2

== World Group play-offs ==
The four losing teams in the World Group first round ties (Argentina, Austria, Belgium and Italy), and four winners of the World Group II ties (Croatia, Czech Republic, Germany and Switzerland) entered the draw for the World Group play-offs.

Date: 9–10 July

Venue	Surface	Home team	Score	Visiting team
Lausanne, Switzerland	Outdoor clay	Switzerland	1–4	Austria
Bree, Belgium	Outdoor hard	Belgium	3–2	Argentina
Bol, Croatia	Outdoor clay	Croatia	1–4	Germany
Liberec, Czech Republic	Indoor carpet	Czech Republic	2–3	Italy

== World Group II ==
The World Group II was the second highest level of Fed Cup competition in 2005. Winners advanced to the World Group play-offs, and losers played in the World Group II play-offs.

Date: 23–24 April

Venue	Surface	Home team	Score	Visiting team
Neuchâtel, Switzerland	Indoor hard	Switzerland	3–2	Slovakia
Essen, Germany	Outdoor clay	Germany	4–1	Indonesia
Phuket, Thailand	Outdoor hard	Thailand	2–3	Croatia
Prague, Czech Republic	Outdoor clay	Czech Republic	3–2	Japan

== World Group II play-offs ==
The four losing teams from World Group II (Indonesia, Japan, Slovakia and Thailand) played off against qualifiers from Zonal Group I. Two teams qualified from Europe/Africa Zone (Bulgaria and Slovenia), one team from the Asia/Oceania Zone (China), and one team from the Americas Zone (Puerto Rico).

Date: 9–10 July

Venue	Surface	Home team	Score	Visiting team
Salinas, Puerto Rico	Outdoor hard	Puerto Rico	1–4	Indonesia
Tokyo, Japan	Indoor hard	Japan	4–1	Bulgaria
Pathum Thani, Thailand	Outdoor hard	Thailand	4–1	Slovakia
Beijing, China	Indoor hard	China	4–1	Slovenia

== Americas Zone ==
- Nations in **bold** advanced to the higher level of competition.
- Nations in italics were relegated down to a lower level of competition.

=== Group I ===
Venue: Carrasco Lawn Tennis Club, Montevideo, Uruguay (outdoor clay)

Dates: 20–23 April

Participating teams

- Bolivia
- Brazil
- Canada
- Cuba
- Mexico
- Paraguay
- **Puerto Rico**
- Uruguay

=== Group II ===
Venue: Liga de Tenis de Campo de Antioquia, Medellín, Colombia (outdoor clay)

Dates: 21–23 April

Participating teams

- **Chile**
- **Colombia**
- Dominican Republic
- Venezuela

== Asia/Oceania Zone ==
- Nations in **bold** advanced to the higher level of competition.
- Nations in italics were relegated down to a lower level of competition.

=== Group I ===
Venue: R.K. Khanna Tennis Complex, New Delhi, India (outdoor hard)

Dates: 20–23 April

Participating teams

- Australia
- **China**
- Chinese Taipei
- India
- Kazakhstan
- New Zealand
- Singapore
- South Korea

=== Group II ===
Venue: R.K. Khanna Tennis Complex, New Delhi, India (outdoor hard)

Dates: 19–21 April

Participating teams

- **Philippines**
- Syria
- Turkmenistan
- **Uzbekistan**

== Europe/Africa Zone ==
- Nations in **bold** advanced to the higher level of competition.
- Nations in italics were relegated down to a lower level of competition.

=== Group I ===
Venue: Club Ali Bey, Manavgat, Antalya, Turkey (outdoor clay)

Dates: 20–23 April

Participating teams

- Belarus
- **Bulgaria**
- Denmark
- Estonia
- Great Britain
- Greece
- Hungary
- Israel
- Luxembourg
- Netherlands
- Poland
- Serbia and Montenegro
- **Slovenia**
- South Africa
- Sweden
- Ukraine

=== Group II ===
Venue: Club Ali Bey, Manavgat, Antalya, Turkey (outdoor hard)

Dates: 27–30 April

Participating teams

- **Finland**
- Georgia
- Ireland
- Latvia
- Lithuania
- Norway
- **Romania**
- Tunisia

=== Group III ===
Venue: Club Ali Bey, Manavgat, Antalya, Turkey (outdoor clay)

Dates: 28–30 April

Participating teams

- **Algeria**
- Bosnia and Herzegovina
- Botswana
- Cyprus
- Egypt
- Iceland
- Kenya
- Malta
- Moldova
- Namibia
- **Portugal**
- Turkey

== Rankings ==
The rankings were measured after the three points during the year that play took place, and were collated by combining points earned from the previous four years.

25 April
Rank	Nation	Points	Move
1	France	33,547.5	Steady
2	Russia	31,637.5	Steady
3	Spain	17,955.0	Steady
4	United States	15,052.5	▲2
5	Slovakia	11,655.0	▼1
6	Belgium	10,550.0	▼1
7	Austria	9,390.0	Steady
8	Italy	5,125.0	Steady
9	Germany	4,825.0	▲2
10	Croatia	4,260.0	▲3

11 July
Rank	Nation	Points	Move
1	France	37,145.0	Steady
2	Russia	34,992.5	Steady
3	Spain	15,910.0	Steady
4	United States	13,765.0	Steady
5	Belgium	11,600.0	▲1
6	Slovakia	10,385.0	▼1
7	Austria	8,920.0	Steady
8	Germany	6,425.0	▲1
9	Italy	6,225.0	▼1
10	Switzerland	3,685.0	▲1

19 September
Rank	Nation	Points	Move
1	Russia	37,355.0	▲1
2	France	30,510.0	▼1
3	Spain	12,910.0	Steady
4	United States	12,220.0	Steady
5	Austria	8,920.0	▲2
6	Belgium	7,350.0	▼1
7	Slovakia	6,885.0	▼1
8	Italy	6,225.0	▲1
9	Germany	5,675.0	▼1
10	Switzerland	3,685.0	Steady
