= Belgium Billie Jean King Cup team =

Belgian national women's tennis team

Belgium
- Captain: Wim Fissette
- Nations Ranking: 6 ▲3 (23 April 2018)
- Colors: red & black
- First year: 1963
- Years played: 54
- Ties played (W–L): 151 (80–71)
- Years in World Group: 42 (21–41)
- Titles: 1 (2001)
- Runners-up: 1 (2006)
- Most total wins: Sabine Appelmans (32–22)
- Most singles wins: Sabine Appelmans (25–13)
- Most doubles wins: Els Callens (17–6)
- Best doubles team: Michèle Gurdal / Monique Van Haver (11–9)
- Most ties played: Sabine Appelmans (33)
- Most years played: Kirsten Flipkens (15)

The Belgian women's national tennis team, managed by the Belgian Tennis Federation, has been competing in the International Tennis Federation sanctioned Fed Cup since the very beginning: 1963. It has won the competition once, in 2001. Both Kim Clijsters and Justine Henin won their singles matches to seal the first victory for Belgium against Russia in Madrid.

== Current team (2026) ==
- Elise Mertens
- Hanne Vandewinkel
- Greet Minnen
- Sofia Costoulas
- Magali Kempen

== Players ==
Note: players in bold are part of the 2018 Fed Cup team.

Name	DOB	Years	First	Last	Ties	Win/Loss		
Name	DOB	Years	First	Last	Ties	Tot	Sin	Dou
Sabine Appelmans	22 April 1972	12	1988	1999	33	32–22	25–13	7–9
Monique Bedoret	25 October 1932	2	1964	1966	2	1–2	0–1	1–1
Elza Bellens	14 May 1932	1	1963	1963	1	0–1	0–1	0–0
Marie Benoît	16 March 1995	1	2016	2016	1	1–0	0–0	1–0
Ysaline Bonaventure	29 August 1994	4	2012	2016	9	7–4	4–0	3–4
Leslie Butkiewicz	26 May 1982	2	2005	2006	2	0–2	0–1	0–1
Els Callens	20 August 1970	11	1994	2005	28	26–13	9–7	17–6
Kim Clijsters	8 June 1983	9	2000	2011	17	24–4	21–3	3–1
Elke Clijsters	18 January 1985	3	2002	2004	3	0–4	0–1	0–3
Laurence Courtois	18 January 1976	8	1993	2002	25	19–10	8–3	11–7
Marianne De Crop	23 December 1960	1	1977	1977	1	0–1	0–1	0–0
Ilse de Ruysscher	13 July 1962	2	1985	1986	5	4–3	1–1	3–2
Marion De Witte	20 December 1953	2	1981	1982	7	6–8	3–4	3–4
Marlene De Wouters	18 February 1963	2	1981	1983	4	0–4	0–2	0–2
Ann Devries	27 February 1979	5	1985	1991	15	12–13	6–6	6–7
Nancy Feber	5 February 1976	4	1993	1997	14	11–3	2–2	9–1
Debbrich Feys	20 December 1984	2	2007	2008	2	1–2	0–1	1–1
**Kirsten Flipkens**	10 January 1986	15	2003	2018	26	14–30	12–20	2–10
Ann Gabriel	14 August 1963	4	1981	1984	11	7–9	6–5	1–4
Michèle Gurdal	30 November 1952	9	1972	1980	28	24–25	13–15	11–10
Tamaryn Hendler	12 August 1992	4	2007	2012	6	0–8	0–6	0–2
Justine Henin	1 June 1982	7	1999	2010	12	15–4	15–2	0–2
Michele Kahn	14 February 1939	3	1966	1970	6	2–6	1–4	1–2
Nicole Mabille	15 March 1961	3	1980	1984	6	3–6	2–1	1–5
Caroline Maes	9 November 1982	5	2002	2008	7	2–7	0–3	2–4
Mary Marechal		1	1963	1963	1	0–1	0–0	0–1
Christiane Mercelis	5 October 1931	6	1963	1969	8	2–11	0–5	2–6
**Elise Mertens**	17 November 1995	2	2017	2018	4	8–2	6–1	2–1
An-Sophie Mestach	7 March 1994	7	2010	2017	13	9–6	1–1	8–5
Dominique Monami	31 May 1973	9	1991	2000	21	22–11	17–7	5–4
Sofie Oyen	4 February 1992	2	2009	2010	2	0–2	0–0	0–2
Ingrid Palmieri	12 January 1948	4	1967	1970	7	2–9	1–6	1–3
Kathleen Schuurmans	3 July 1966	2	1984	1985	6	3–4	1–2	2–2
Monique Van Haver	31 August 1948	10	1970	1980	30	22–28	10–18	12–10
Caroline van Renterghem	31 January 1972	2	1988	1989	5	1–6	0–2	1–4
**Alison Van Uytvanck**	26 March 1994	7	2012	2018	18	15–10	12–5	3–5
Eveline Vanhyfte	19 March 1984	1	2005	2005	1	0–2	0–1	0–1
Aude Vermoezen	25 July 1989	1	2007	2007	1	0–1	0–0	0–1
Sandra Wasserman	10 March 1970	6	1985	1992	16	14–11	8–6	6–5
Yanina Wickmayer	20 October 1989	11	2007	2017	19	26–12	23–8	3–4
Ingrid Willems	1 December 1959	1	1982	1982	3	2–1	0–0	2–1
Maryna Zanevska	24 August 1993	1	2017	2017	2	0–2	0–1	0–1

== Results ==
=== Overview ===
Tournament	1963	1964	1965	1966	1967	1968	1969	1970	1971	1972	1973	1974	1975	1976	1977	1978	1979	1980	1981	1982	1983	1984	1985	1986	1987	1988	1989	1990
Federation Cup
World Group	1R	2R	A	1R	1R	1R	2R	1R	A	1R	2R	1R	2R	2R	1R	1R	2R	1R	1R	1R	1R	2R	1R	1R	1R	1R	1R	2R
Consolation Rounds	Not Held						SF	SF	A	SF	2R	SF	SF	A	SF	NH	A	QF	QF	QF	2R	A	2R	QF	2R	QF	2R	A

Tournament	1991	1992	1993	1994	1995	1996	1997	1998	1999	2000	2001	2002	2003	2004	2005	2006	2007	2008	2009	2010	2011	2012	2013	2014	2015	2016	2017	2018	2019
Federation Cup				Fed Cup																									
World Group	1R	1R	1R	1R	A	A	SF	QF	A	SF	W	QF	SF	QF	QF	F	QF	A	A	A	SF	QF	A	A	A	A	A	QF	QF
World Group play-offs	W	L	L	NH	A	W	A	L	NH	NH	A	A	A	A	W	A	L	A	A	W	A	L	A	A	A	A	W	W	L
World Group II	Not Held				A	W	A	A	W	A	A	A	A	A	A	A	A	L	L	W	A	A	L	A	A	A	W	A	A
World Group II play-offs	Not Held				W	A	A	A	A	A	A	A	A	A	A	A	A	W	W	A	A	A	L	A	A	W	A	A	A
Europe/Africa Group I play-offs	A	A	W	W	W	A	A	A	A	A	A	A	A	A	A	A	A	A	A	A	A	A	A	A	A	W	A	A	A
Europe/Africa Group I	A	A	W	W	W	A	A	A	A	A	A	A	A	A	A	A	A	A	A	A	A	A	A	2nd	2nd	1st	A	A	A

=== Head-to-head ===
Team	Record	W%	Hard	Clay	Grass	Carpet	Unknown	First Meeting	Last Meeting
Israel	6–0	100.00%	2–0	4–0	0–0	0–0	0–0	1972 Consolation Second Round, BEL 3–0 ISR in Johannesburg, Belgium	2015 Europe/Africa Zone I – Pool D, BEL 3–0 ISR in Budapest, Hungary
Romania	4–0	100.00%	1–0	3–0	0–0	0–0	0–0	1975 Consolation Quarterfinal, BEL 2–0 ROM in Aix-en-Provence, France	2017 WG II, BEL 3–1 ROM in Bucharest, Romania
Russia	4–1	80.00%	0–0	3–1	0–0	1–0	0–0	1975 Consolation Quarterfinal, BEL 0–3 USSR in Paris, France	2017 WG Play-offs, BEL 3–2 RUS in Moscow, Russia
Canada	3–0	100.00%	0–0	3–0	0–0	0–0	0–0	1969 Consolation First Round, BEL 2–1 CAN in Athens, Greece	2009 WG II play-offs, BEL 3–2 CAN in Hasselt, Belgium
Serbia	3–1	75.00%	0–1	2–0	0–0	0–0	1–0	1975 Consolation First Round, BEL 2–1 YUG in Aix-en-Provence, France	2016 WG II play-offs, BEL 3–2 SRB in Belgrade, Serbia
Croatia	3–2	60.00%	1–1	2–1	0–0	0–0	0–0	1993 WG Play-offs, BEL 1–2 CRO in Frankfurt, Germany	2015 Europe/Africa Zone I – Pool D, BEL 1–2 CRO in Budapest, Hungary
Australia	3–5	37.50%	0–0	2–2	0–1	1–1	0–1	1978 WG First Round, BEL 0–3 AUS in Melbourne, Australia	2002 WG First Round, BEL 3–1 AUS in Brussels, Belgium
Spain	3–5	37.50%	1–1	1–3	1–0	0–0	0–1	1977 Consolation Second Round, BEL 1–2 ESP in Eastbourne, England	2019 WG Play-offs, BEL 2–3 ESP in Kortrijk, Belgium
Colombia	2–0	100.00%	1–0	1–0	0–0	0–0	0–0	1984 WG First Round, BEL 2–1 COL in São Paulo, Brazil	2008 WG II play-offs, BEL 5–0 COL in Mons, Belgium
Estonia	2–0	100.00%	0–0	2–0	0–0	0–0	0–0	1994 Europe/Africa Zone I – Pool A, BEL 3–0 EST in Bad Waltersdorf, Austria	2010 WG I play-offs, BEL 3–2 EST in Hasselt, Belgium
Indonesia	2–0	100.00%	1–0	1–0	0–0	0–0	0–0	1974 Consolation Quarterfinal, BEL 2–1 INA in Naples, Italy	2010 WG I play-offs, BEL 3–2 INA in Jakarta, Indonesia
Ireland	2–0	100.00%	1–0	1–0	0–0	0–0	0–0	1979 WG First Round, BEL 3–0 IRL in Madrid, Spain	1993 Europe/Africa Zone – Pool B, BEL 3–0 IRL in Nottingham, England
Norway	2–0	100.00%	1–0	1–0	0–0	0–0	0–0	1983 Consolation First Round, BEL 2–1 NOR in Zürich, Switzerland	1993 Europe/Africa Zone – Pool B, BEL 3–0 NOR in Nottingham, England
Portugal	2–0	100.00%	2–0	0–0	0–0	0–0	0–0	1982 Consolation First Round, BEL 3–0 POR in Santa Clara, United States	2014 Europe/Africa Zone I – 5th to 8th play-offs, BEL 2–1 POR in Budapest, Hungary
Turkey	2–0	100.00%	0–0	2–0	0–0	0–0	0–0	1994 Europe/Africa Zone I – Pool A, BEL 3–0 TUR in Bad Waltersdorf, Austria	1994 Europe/Africa Zone I – Knockout Stage Semifinal, BEL 3–0 TUR in Bad Waltersdorf, Austria
South Korea	2–1	66.67%	0–0	1–1	0–0	0–0	1–0	1973 Consolation Second Round, BEL 2–0 KOR in Bad Homburg, Germany	1995 WG II play-offs, BEL 3–2 KOR in Ostend, Belgium
Latvia	2–1	66.67%	2–0	0–1	0–0	0–0	0–0	1993 WG First Round, BEL 1–2 LAT in Frankfurt, Germany	2016 Europe/Africa Zone I – Pool D, BEL 3–0 LAT in Eilat, Israel
Argentina	2–2	50.00%	1–0	0–1	1–1	0–0	0–0	1964 WG Second Round, BEL 0–3 ARG in Philadelphia, United States	2005 WG Play-offs, BEL 3–2 ARG in Bree, Belgium
Austria	2–2	50.00%	0–0	2–1	0–0	0–0	0–1	1974 Consolation Second Round, BEL 3–0 AUT in Naples, Italy	2003 WG First Round, BEL 5–0 AUT in Bree, Belgium
Sweden	2–2	50.00%	1–0	1–2	0–0	0–0	0–0	1983 WG First Round, BEL 0–3 SWE in Zürich, Switzerland	1994 WG First Round, BEL 1–2 SWE in Frankfurt, Germany
Great Britain	2–4	33.33%	1–0	1–3	0–0	0–0	0–0	1969 WG Second Round, BEL 0–3 GBR in Athens, Greece	2016 Europe/Africa Zone I – Promotional Play-offs, BEL 2–0 GBR in Eilat, Israel
Hungary	2–4	33.33%	1–2	1–2	0–0	0–0	0–0	1966 WG Second Round, BEL 1–2 HUN in Turin, Italy	2016 Europe/Africa Zone I – Pool D, BEL 3–0 HUN in Eilat, Israel
United States	2–5	28.57%	2–3	0–0	0–0	0–2	0–0	1990 WG Second Round, BEL 0–3 USA in Norcross, United States	2011 WG First Round, BEL 4–1 USA in Merksem, Belgium
Bulgaria	1–0	100.00%	1–0	0–0	0–0	0–0	0–0	2016 Europe/Africa Zone I – Pool D, BEL 3–0 BUL in Eilat, Israel	
Ecuador	1–0	100.00%	1–0	0–0	0–0	0–0	0–0	1972 Consolation Quarterfinal, BEL 3–0 ECU in Johannesburg, South Africa	
Egypt	1–0	100.00%	0–0	1–0	0–0	0–0	0–0	1986 Consolation First Round, BEL 3–0 EGY in Prague, Czechoslovakia	
Finland	1–0	100.00%	0–0	1–0	0–0	0–0	0–0	1986 WG Qualifying Round, BEL 3–0 FIN in Prague, Czechoslovakia	
Greece	1–0	100.00%	0–0	0–0	0–0	0–0	1–0	1988 Consolation Second Round, BEL 2–1 GRE in Melbourne, Australia	
Luxembourg	1–0	100.00%	1–0	0–0	0–0	0–0	0–0	2014 Europe/Africa Zone I – Pool A, BEL 3–0 LUX in Budapest, Hungary	
Senegal	1–0	100.00%	1–0	0–0	0–0	0–0	0–0	1993 Europe/Africa Zone – Pool B, BEL 3–0 SEN in Nottingham, England	
Slovenia	1–0	100.00%	1–0	0–0	0–0	0–0	0–0	1993 Europe/Africa Zone – Play-offs, BEL 2–1 SLO in Nottingham, England	
Thailand	1–0	100.00%	1–0	0–0	0–0	0–0	0–0	1985 Consolation First Round, BEL 3–0 THA in Nagoya, Japan	
Uruguay	1–0	100.00%	1–0	0–0	0–0	0–0	0–0	1985 WG Qualifying Round, BEL 3–0 URU in Nagoya, Japan	
Zimbabwe	1–0	100.00%	0–0	0–0	0–0	1–0	0–0	1976 WG First Round, BEL 2–1 RHO in Philadelphia, United States	
Denmark	1–1	50.00%	0–0	1–0	0–1	0–0	0–0	1975 Consolation Second Round, BEL 0–2 DEN in Aix-en-Provence, France	1977 Consolation Semifinal, BEL 3–0 DEN in Eastbourne, England
Germany	1–1	50.00%	1–1	0–0	0–0	0–0	0–0	1986 Consolation Second Round, BEL 0–3 FRG in Prague, Czechoslovakia	2001 WG – Pool B, BEL 3–0 GER in Madrid, Spain
Netherlands	1–1	50.00%	0–1	0–0	0–0	1–0	0–0	1999 WG II, BEL 5–0 NED in 's-Hertogenbosch, Netherlands	2014 Europe/Africa Zone I – Pool A, BEL 0–3 LUX in Budapest, Hungary
New Zealand	1–1	50.00%	0–0	1–0	0–1	0–0	0–0	1973 Consolation First Round, BEL 2–1 NZL in Bad Homburg, Germany	1977 WG First Round, BEL 1–2 NZL in Eastbourne, England
Poland	1–1	50.00%	1–1	0–0	0–0	0–0	0–0	2010 WG II, BEL 3–2 POL in Bydgoszcz, Poland	2013 WG II play-offs, BEL 1–4 POL in Koksijde, Belgium
Slovakia	1–1	50.00%	1–1	0–0	0–0	0–0	0–0	1998 WG Play-offs, BEL 1–4 SVK in Bratislava, Slovakia	2009 WG II, BEL 1–4 SVK in Bratislava, Slovakia
South Africa	1–4	20.00%	1–1	0–3	0–0	0–0	0–0	1969 Consolation Semifinal, BEL 1–2 RSA in Athens, Greece	1996 WG Play-offs, BEL 4–1 RSA in Bloemfontein, South Africa
Switzerland	1–4	20.00%	0–1	1–3	0–0	0–0	0–0	1970 WG First Round, BEL 1–2 SUI in Freiburg, West Germany	2013 WG II, BEL 1–4 SUI in Bern, Switzerland
France	1–5	16.67%	0–3	0–2	0–0	1–0	0–0	1980 Consolation Quarterfinal, BEL 0–2 FRA in West Berlin	2019 WG First Round, BEL 1–3 FRA in Liège, Belgium
Italy	1–7	12.50%	0–2	1–4	0–0	0–0	0–1	1967 WG First Round, BEL 0–3 ITA in West Berlin	2018 WG Play-offs, BEL 4–0 ITA in Genoa, Italy
China	0–1	0.00%	0–0	0–1	0–0	0–0	0–0	2007 WG Play-offs, BEL 1–4 CHN in Knokke-Heist, Belgium	
Hong Kong	0–1	0.00%	0–0	0–0	0–0	0–0	0–1	1987 Consolation Second Round, BEL 0–3 HKG in Prague, Czechoslovakia	
Mexico	0–1	0.00%	0–0	0–0	0–0	0–0	0–1	1982 WG First Round, BEL 1–2 MEX in Santa Clara, United States	
Philippines	0–1	0.00%	0–1	0–0	0–0	0–0	0–0	1985 Consolation Second Round, BEL 1–2 PHI in Nagoya, Japan	
Ukraine	0–1	0.00%	0–0	0–1	0–0	0–0	0–0	2008 WG II, BEL 2–3 UKR in Kharkiv, Ukraine	
Czech Republic	0–2	0.00%	0–2	0–0	0–0	0–0	0–0	1989 WG Play-offs, BEL 0–3 CSK in Tokyo, Japan	2011 WG Semifinal, BEL 2–3 CZE in Charleroi, Belgium
Japan	0–4	0.00%	0–2	0–1	0–0	0–0	0–1	1972 Consolation Semifinal, BEL 1–2 JPN in Johannesburg, South Africa	2012 WG Play-offs, BEL 1–4 JPN in Tokyo, Japan

=== By Decade ===
==== 1963–1969 ====
Year	Competition	Date	Location	Opponent	Score	Result
1963	World Group, 1st round	17 June	London (GBR)	Australia	0–3	Lost
1964	World Group, 1st round	2 September	Philadelphia (USA)	Argentina	0–3	Lost
1966	World Group, 1st round	10 May	Turin (ITA)	Hungary	1–2	Lost
1967	World Group, 1st round	6 June	West Berlin (FRG)	Italy	0–3	Lost
1968	World Group, 1st round	21 May	Paris (FRA)	Soviet Union	0–3	Lost
1969	World Group, 2nd Round	22 May	Athens (GRE)	(United Kingdom) Great Britain	0–3	Lost
1969	World Group, Consolation Qualifying Round	23 May	Athens (GRE)	Canada	2–1	Won
1969	World Group, 1st Round	24 May	Athens (GRE)	South Africa	1–2	Lost

==== 1980–1989 ====
Year	Competition	Date	Location	Opponent	Score	Result
1980	World Group, 1st round	19–25 May	West Berlin (FRG)	Italy	3–0	Lost
1980	World Group Consolation Rounds, 1st round	19–25 May	West Berlin (FRG)	Israel	3–0	Won
1980	World Group Consolation Rounds, Quarter-final	19–25 May	West Berlin (FRG)	France	0–2*	Lost
1981	World Group, 1st round	9–15 November	Tokyo (JPN)	(United Kingdom) Great Britain	0–3	Lost
1981	World Group Consolation Rounds, 1st round	9–15 November	Tokyo (JPN)	Canada	3–0	Won
1981	World Group Consolation Rounds, 2nd round	9–15 November	Tokyo (JPN)	Israel	2–1	Won
1981	World Group Consolation Rounds, Quarter-final	9–15 November	Tokyo (JPN)	Spain	1–2	Lost
1982	World Group, 1st round	19–25 July	Santa Clara (USA)	Mexico	1–2	Lost
1982	World Group Consolation Rounds, 1st round	19–25 July	Santa Clara (USA)	Portugal	3–0	Won
1982	World Group Consolation Rounds, Quarter-final	19–25 July	Santa Clara (USA)	Italy	0–3	Lost
1983	World Group, 1st round	17–24 July	Zürich (SUI)	Sweden	0–3	Lost
1983	World Group Consolation Rounds, 1st round	17–24 July	Zürich (SUI)	Norway	2–1	Won
1983	World Group Consolation Rounds, 2nd round	17–24 July	Zürich (SUI)	Austria	2–1	Lost
1984	World Group, 1st round	15–22 July	São Paulo (BRA)	Colombia	2–1	Won
1984	World Group, 2nd round	15–22 July	São Paulo (BRA)	Australia	0–3	Lost
1985	World Group, qualifying round	6–14 October	Nagoya (JPN)	Uruguay	3–0	Won
1985	World Group, 1st round	6–14 October	Nagoya (JPN)	Hungary	0–3	Lost
1985	World Group Consolation Rounds, 1st round	6–14 October	Nagoya (JPN)	Philippines	1–2	Lost
1985	World Group Consolation Rounds, 1st round	6–14 October	Nagoya (JPN)	Thailand	3–0	Lost
1986	World Group, qualifying round	20–27 July	Prague (TCH)	Finland	3–0	Won
1986	World Group, 1st Round	20–27 July	Prague (TCH)	West Germany	0–3	Lost
1986	World Group Consolation Rounds, 1st round	20–27 July	Prague (TCH)	Egypt	3–0	Won
1986	World Group Consolation Rounds, 2nd round	20–27 July	Prague (TCH)	Sweden	3–0	Won
1986	World Group Consolation Rounds, Quarter-final	20–27 July	Prague (TCH)	Hungary	1–2	Lost

==== 1990–1999 ====
Year	Competition	Date	Location	Opponent	Score	Result
1990	World Group, 1st round	21–29 July	Atlanta (USA)	Sweden	2–1	Won
1990	World Group, 2nd round	21–29 July	Atlanta (USA)	United States	0–3	Lost
1991	World Group, 1st round	23 July	Nottingham (GBR)	Spain	0–2*	Lost
1991	World Group play-offs, 1st round	25 July	Nottingham (GBR)	Japan	1–2	Lost
1991	World Group play-offs, Repechage Round	26 July	Nottingham (GBR)	(Socialist Federal Republic of Yugoslavia) Yugoslavia	3–0	Won
1992	World Group, 1st round	14 July	Frankfurt (GER)	Spain	1–2	Lost
1992	World Group play-offs	16 July	Frankfurt (GER)	South Africa	1–2	Lost
1993	Europe/Africa Zone, Group I/B, Round Robin	11 May	Nottingham (GBR)	(Republic of Ireland) Ireland	3–0	Won
1993	Europe/Africa Zone, Group I/B, Round Robin	12 May	Nottingham (GBR)	Norway	3–0	Won
1993	Europe/Africa Zone, Group I/B, Round Robin	13 May	Nottingham (GBR)	Senegal	3–0	Won
1993	Europe/Africa Zone, 1st round	15 May	Nottingham (GBR)	Slovenia	2–1	Won
1993	World Group, 1st round	19–20 July	Frankfurt (GER)	Latvia	1–2	Lost
1993	World Group play-offs	21–22 July	Frankfurt (GER)	Croatia	1–2	Lost
1994	Europe/Africa Zone, Group I/A, Round Robin	19 April	Bad Waltersdorf (AUT)	Turkey	3–0	Won
1994	Europe/Africa Zone, Group I/A, Round Robin	21 April	Bad Waltersdorf (AUT)	Estonia	3–0	Won
1994	Europe/Africa Zone, 1st round	22 April	Bad Waltersdorf (AUT)	Turkey	3–0	Won
1994	Europe/Africa Zone, Quarter-final	23 April	Bad Waltersdorf (AUT)	(United Kingdom) Great Britain	2–0*	Won
1994	World Group, 1st round	18–19 July	Frankfurt (GER)	Sweden	1–2	Lost
1995	Europe/Africa Zone, Group I/D, Round Robin	17 April	Murcia (ESP)	Croatia	2–1	Won
1995	Europe/Africa Zone, Group I/D, Round Robin	18 April	Murcia (ESP)	Romania	2–1	Won
1995	Europe/Africa Zone, Group I/D, Round Robin	19 April	Murcia (ESP)	Israel	3–0	Won
1995	Europe/Africa Zone, Group I, 1st round	20 April	Murcia (ESP)	Romania	3–0	Won
1995	Europe/Africa Zone, Group I, Semi-finals	21 April	Murcia (ESP)	Hungary	3–0	Won
1995	World Group II play-offs	22–23 July	Ostend (BEL)	South Korea	3–2	Won
1996	World Group II	27–28 April	Jakarta (INA)	Indonesia	3–2	Won
1996	World Group I play-offs	12–13 July	Bloemfontein (RSA)	South Africa	4–1	Won
1997	World Group I, 1st round	1–2 March	Sprimont (BEL)	Spain	5–0	Won
1997	World Group I, Semi-finals	12–13 July	Nice (FRA)	France	2–3	Lost
1998	World Group I, 1st round	18–19 April	Ghent (BEL)	France	2–3	Lost
1998	World Group I play-offs	25–26 July	Bratislava (SVK)	Slovakia	1–4	Lost
1999	World Group II	17–18 April	Den Bosch (NED)	Netherlands	5–0	Won

==== 2000–2009 ====
Year	Competition	Date	Location	Opponent	Score	Result
2000	World Group, Round Robin (Group C)	27 April	Moscow (RUS)	Australia	2–1	Won
2000	World Group, Round Robin (Group C)	29 April	Moscow (RUS)	France	2–1	Won
2000	World Group, Round Robin (Group C)	30 April	Moscow (RUS)	Russia	2–1	Won
2000	World Group, Semi-final	21 November	Las Vegas (USA)	United States	1–2	Lost
2001	World Group, Round Robin (Group B)	7 November	Madrid (ESP)	Germany	3–0	Won
2001	World Group, Round Robin (Group B)	9 November	Madrid (ESP)	Australia	3–0	Won
2001	World Group, Round Robin (Group B)	10 November	Madrid (ESP)	Spain	3–0	Won
2001	World Group, Final	11 November	Madrid (ESP)	Russia	2–1	Champion
2002	World Group, 1st round	27–28 April	Brussels (BEL)	Australia	3–1*	Won
2002	World Group, Quarter-final	20–21 July	Bologna (ITA)	Italy	1–4	Lost
2003	World Group, 1st round	26–27 April	Bree (BEL)	Austria	5–0	Won
2003	World Group, Quarter-final	19–20 July	Charleroi (BEL)	Slovakia	5–0	Won
2003	World Group, Semi-final	19–20 November	Moscow (RUS)	United States	1–4	Lost
2004	World Group, 1st round	24–25 April	Bree (BEL)	Croatia	3–2	Won
2004	World Group, Quarter-final	10–11 July	Jerez (ESP)	Spain	2–3	Lost
2005	World Group, 1st round	23–24 April	Delray Beach (USA)	United States	0–5	Lost
2005	World Group play-offs	9–10 July	Bree (BEL)	Argentina	3–2	Won
2006	World Group, 1st round	22–23 April	Liège (BEL)	Russia	3–2	Won
2006	World Group, Semi-final	15–16 July	Ostend (BEL)	United States	4–1	Won
2006	World Group, Final	16–17 September	Charleroi (BEL)	Italy	2–3	Lost
2007	World Group, 1st round	21–22 April	Delray Beach (USA)	United States	0–5	Lost
2007	World Group play-offs	14–15 July	Knokke-Heist (BEL)	China	1–4	Lost
2008	World Group II	2–3 February	Kharkiv (UKR)	Ukraine	2–3	Lost
2008	World Group II play-offs	26–27 April	Mons (BEL)	Colombia	5–0	Won
2009	World Group II	7–8 February	Bratislava (SVK)	Slovakia	1–4	Lost
2009	World Group II play-offs	25–26 April	Hasselt (BEL)	Canada	3–2	Won

==== 2010–2019 ====
Year	Competition	Date	Location	Opponent	Score	Result
2010	World Group II	6–7 February	Bydgoszcz (POL)	Poland	3–2	Won
2010	World Group play-offs	24–25 April	Hasselt (BEL)	Estonia	3–2	Won
2011	World Group, 1st round	5–6 February	Antwerp (BEL)	United States	4–1	Won
2011	World Group, Semi-final	16–17 April	Charleroi (BEL)	Czech Republic	2–3	Lost
2012	World Group, 1st Round	4–5 February	Charleroi (BEL)	Serbia	2–3	Lost
2012	World Group play-offs	21–22 April	Tokyo (JPN)	Japan	1–4	Lost
2013	World Group II, 1st Round	9–10 February	Bern (SUI)	Switzerland	1–4	Lost
2013	World Group II play-offs	20–21 April	Koksijde (BEL)	Poland	1–4	Lost
2014	Europe/Africa Zone, Group I/A, Round Robin	4 February	Budapest (HUN)	Luxembourg	3–0	Won
2014	Europe/Africa Zone, Group I/A, Round Robin	5 February	Budapest (HUN)	Netherlands	0–3	Lost
2014	Europe/Africa Zone, Group I/A, Round Robin	7 February	Budapest (HUN)	Croatia	3–0	Won
2014	Europe/Africa Zone, 5th to 8th Play-off	9 February	Budapest (HUN)	Portugal	2–1	Won
2015	Europe/Africa Zone, Group I/D, Round Robin	4 February	Budapest (HUN)	Latvia	3–0	Won
2015	Europe/Africa Zone, Group I/D, Round Robin	5 February	Budapest (HUN)	Israel	3–0	Won
2015	Europe/Africa Zone, Group I/D, Round Robin	6 February	Budapest (HUN)	Croatia	1–2	Lost
2015	Europe/Africa Zone, 5th to 8th Play-off	7 February	Budapest (HUN)	Hungary	0–3	Lost
2016	Europe/Africa Zone, Group I/D, Round Robin	3 February	Eilat (ISR)	Latvia	3–0	Won
2016	Europe/Africa Zone, Group I/D, Round Robin	4 February	Eilat (ISR)	Hungary	3–0	Won
2016	Europe/Africa Zone, Group I/D, Round Robin	5 February	Eilat (ISR)	Bulgaria	3–0	Won
2016	Europe/Africa Zone, Promotional Play-off	6 February	Eilat (ISR)	(United Kingdom) Great Britain	2–0	Won
2016	World Group II play-offs	16–17 April	Belgrade (SRB)	Serbia	3–2	Won
2017	World Group II, 1st Round	11–12 February	Bucharest (ROM)	Romania	3–1	Won
2017	World Group play-offs	22–23 April	Moscow (RUS)	Russia	3–2	Won
2018	World Group I, 1st Round	10–11 February	La Roche-sur-Yon (FRA)	France	2–3	Lost
2018	World Group play-offs	21–22 April	Genoa (ITA)	Italy	4–0	Won
2019	World Group I, 1st Round	9–10 February	Liège (BEL)	France	1–3	Lost
2019	World Group play-offs	20–21 April	Kortrijk (BEL)	Spain	2–3	Lost

==== 2020–2029 ====
Year	Competition	Date	Location	Opponent	Score	Result
2020–21	Finals qualifying round	7–8 February 2020	Kortrijk (BEL)	Kazakhstan	3–1	Won
2020–21	Finals, Group B	1 November 2021	Prague (CZE)	Belarus	2–1	Won
2020–21	Finals, Group B	2 November 2021	Prague (CZE)	Australia	1–2	Lost
2022	Finals qualifying round	15–16 April	Antalya (TUR)	Belarus	Walkover	Won
2022	Finals, Group B	9 November	Glasgow (SCO)	Slovakia	1–2	Lost
2022	Finals, Group B	10 November	Glasgow (SCO)	Australia	0–3	Lost
2023	Finals qualifying round	14–15 April	Vancouver (CAN)	Canada	2–3	Lost
2023	Play-offs	10–12 November	Charleroi (BEL)	Hungary	3–1	Won
2024	Finals qualifying round	12–13 April	Orlando (USA)	United States	0–4	Lost
2024	Play-offs	15–17 November	Guangzhou (CHN)	China	2–3	Lost
2025	Europe/Africa Zone, Group I/C, Round Robin	8 April	Vilnius (LTU)	Greece	3–0	Won
2025	Europe/Africa Zone, Group I/C, Round Robin	9 April	Vilnius (LTU)	Hungary	2–1	Won
2025	Europe/Africa Zone, Promotional Play-off	11 April	Vilnius (LTU)	France	2–0	Won
2025	Play-offs	15 November	Ismaning (GER)	Turkey	2–1	Won
2025	Play-offs	16 November	Ismaning (GER)	Germany	2–0	Won
2026	Qualifiers	10–11 April	Ostend (BEL)	United States	3–1	Won
2026	Finals	24 September	Shenzhen (CHN)	Ukraine	1–2	Lost

== Famous players ==
- Kim Clijsters
- Dominique Monami
- Justine Henin
- Sabine Appelmans
- Els Callens
- Laurence Courtois
- Ann Devries
- Michele Gurdal
- Monique Van Haver
- Sandra Wasserman
- Yanina Wickmayer
- Kirsten Flipkens
- Elise Mertens

== Coaches ==
No.	Name	Coach From	Coach Until
1	Steven Martens	1994	1998
2	Ivo Van Aken	1999	2004
3	Carl Maes	2005	2007
4	Sabine Appelmans	2007	2011
5	Ann Devries	2011	2016
6	Dominique Monami	2017	2018
7	Ivo Van Aken	2018	2018
8	Johan Van Herck	2018	2023
9	Wim Fissette	2023	Present

== Team statistics ==
- Longest rubber: 3 hrs 35 mins – Els Callens defeated Virginia Ruano Pascual of Spain
- Longest tie-break: 24 Points, 13/11 – Jennifer Capriati of the United States defeated Sandra Wasserman
- Most games in a rubber: 42 Games, 6–7(4) 7–6(8) 9–7 – Meghann Shaughnessy of the United States defeated Kirsten Flipkens
- Oldest player: Christiane Mercelis – 37 years 232 days (1969)
- Youngest player: Tamaryn Hendler – 14 years 252 days (2007)

== See also ==
- Billie Jean King Cup
- Belgium Davis Cup team
- Belgium at the Hopman Cup
- Royal Belgian Tennis Federation
