= 2017 Fed Cup World Group play-offs =

Part of tennis tournament

The World Group play-offs were four ties which involves the losing nations of the World Group first round and the winning nations of the World Group II. Nations that win their play-off ties entered the 2018 World Group, while losing nations joined the 2018 World Group II.

Participating Teams
Belgium	France	Germany	Netherlands
Russia	Slovakia	Spain	Ukraine

== France vs. Spain ==
France
4
Halle André Vacheresse, Roanne, France
22–23 April 2017
Clay (indoors)

Spain
0

			1	2	3
1	(France) (Spain)	Kristina Mladenovic; Sílvia Soler Espinosa	6; 0	6; 1
2	(France) (Spain)	Pauline Parmentier; Sara Sorribes Tormo	6; 4	6; 2
3	(France) (Spain)	Kristina Mladenovic; Sara Sorribes Tormo	6; 1	6; 1
4	(France) (Spain)	Pauline Parmentier; Sílvia Soler Espinosa				not played
5	(France) (Spain)	Alizé Cornet / Amandine Hesse; María José Martínez Sánchez / Olga Sáez Larra	6; 1	3; 6	[10] [7]

== Russia vs. Belgium ==
Russia
2
Luzhniki Small Sports Arena, Moscow, Russia
22–23 April 2017
Clay (indoors)

Belgium
3

			1	2	3
1	(Russia) (Belgium)	Elena Vesnina; Alison Van Uytvanck	6; 3	6; 4
2	(Russia) (Belgium)	Anastasia Pavlyuchenkova; Elise Mertens	4; 6	0; 6
3	(Russia) (Belgium)	Elena Vesnina; Elise Mertens	4; 6	6; 1	2; 6
4	(Russia) (Belgium)	Daria Kasatkina; Maryna Zanevska	5; 7	6; 1	6; 0
5	(Russia) (Belgium)	Daria Kasatkina / Elena Vesnina; Elise Mertens / An-Sophie Mestach	1; 6	6^{2} 7^{7}

== Germany vs. Ukraine ==
Germany
3
Porsche-Arena, Stuttgart, Germany
22–23 April 2017
Clay (indoors)

Ukraine
2

			1	2	3
1	(Germany) (Ukraine)	Julia Görges; Elina Svitolina	4; 6	6; 1	6; 4
2	(Germany) (Ukraine)	Angelique Kerber; Lesia Tsurenko	6; 1	6; 4
3	(Germany) (Ukraine)	Angelique Kerber; Elina Svitolina	4; 6	2; 6
4	(Germany) (Ukraine)	Julia Görges; Lesia Tsurenko	6; 4	6; 4
5	(Germany) (Ukraine)	Laura Siegemund / Carina Witthöft; Nadiia Kichenok / Olga Savchuk	4; 6	6; 4	[6] [10]

== Slovakia vs. Netherlands ==
Slovakia
2
Aegon Arena, Bratislava, Slovakia
22–23 April 2017
Clay (indoors)

Netherlands
3

			1	2	3
1	(Slovakia) (Netherlands)	Jana Čepelová; Richèl Hogenkamp	6; 3	6; 2
2	(Slovakia) (Netherlands)	Rebecca Šramková; Kiki Bertens	1; 6	3; 6
3	(Slovakia) (Netherlands)	Jana Čepelová; Kiki Bertens	3; 6	3; 6
4	(Slovakia) (Netherlands)	Kristína Kučová; Richèl Hogenkamp	5; 7	4; 6
5	(Slovakia) (Netherlands)	Daniela Hantuchová / Rebecca Šramková; Cindy Burger / Arantxa Rus	2; 1			retired
