= 1998 Fed Cup World Group play-offs =

The World Group play-offs were four ties which involved the losing nations of the World Group first round and the winning nations of the World Group II. Nations that won their play-off ties entered the 1999 World Group, while losing nations joined the 1999 World Group II.

== Slovakia vs. Belgium ==
Slovakia
4
Slovan Kerametal Tennis Club, Bratislava, Slovakia
25–26 July 1998
Red clay (outdoors)

Belgium
1

			1	2	3
1	(Slovakia) (Belgium)	Henrieta Nagyová; Sabine Appelmans	7; 5	6; 4
2	(Slovakia) (Belgium)	Karina Habšudová; Dominique Van Roost	6; 2	6; 3
3	(Slovakia) (Belgium)	Henrieta Nagyová; Dominique Van Roost	6; 4	6; 3
4	(Slovakia) (Belgium)	Karina Habšudová; Sabine Appelmans	6; 2	4; 6	7; 5
5	(Slovakia) (Belgium)	Janette Husárová / Katarína Studeníková; Els Callens / Dominique Van Roost	5; 7	1; 6

== Russia vs. Germany ==
Russia
4
Druzhba T.C., Moscow, Russia
25–26 July 1998
Hard (indoors)

Germany
1

			1	2	3
1	(Russia) (Germany)	Tatiana Panova; Andrea Glass	6; 3	6; 1
2	(Russia) (Germany)	Elena Makarova; Anke Huber	6; 1	7^{8} 6^{6}
3	(Russia) (Germany)	Tatiana Panova; Anke Huber	7; 5	6; 3
4	(Russia) (Germany)	Elena Makarova; Andrea Glass	6; 4	6; 1
5	(Russia) (Germany)	Evgenia Kulikovskaya / Ekaterina Sysoeva; Meike Babel / Jana Kandarr	4; 6	2; 6

== Croatia vs. Netherlands ==
Croatia
3
Zlatni Rat T.C., Bol, Croatia
25–26 July 1998
Red clay (outdoors)

Netherlands
2

			1	2	3
1	(Croatia) (Netherlands)	Silvija Talaja; Miriam Oremans	6; 3	6; 3
2	(Croatia) (Netherlands)	Iva Majoli; Amanda Hopmans	1; 6	0; 6
3	(Croatia) (Netherlands)	Iva Majoli; Miriam Oremans	6; 2	6; 2
4	(Croatia) (Netherlands)	Silvija Talaja; Amanda Hopmans	6; 2	6; 3
5	(Croatia) (Netherlands)	Jelena Kostanić / Silvija Talaja; Manon Bollegraf / Caroline Vis	4; 6	6; 3	6^{1} 7^{7}

== Czech Republic vs. Italy ==
Czech Republic
1
National Centre, Prague, Czech Republic
25–26 July 1998
Red clay (outdoors)

Italy
4

			1	2	3
1	(Czech Republic) (Italy)	Radka Bobková; Silvia Farina	0; 6	4; 6
2	(Czech Republic) (Italy)	Květa Hrdličková; Rita Grande	6^{3} 7^{7}	6; 4	4; 6
3	(Czech Republic) (Italy)	Květa Hrdličková; Silvia Farina	2; 6	1; 6
4	(Czech Republic) (Italy)	Radka Bobková; Rita Grande	2; 6	6; 3	7^{7} 6^{5}
5	(Czech Republic) (Italy)	Lenka Němečková / Michaela Paštiková; Francesca Lubiani / Flora Perfetti	2; 6	6; 4	5; 7

== See also ==
- Fed Cup structure
