= 1993 Federation Cup World Group play-offs =

The World Group play-offs for the 1993 Federation Cup was held during 22 July at the Waldstadion T.C. in Frankfurt, Germany, on clay courts.

The sixteen teams that were defeated in the first round of the World Group played off in eight ties, with the winning teams remaining in the World Group for 1994.

== Canada vs. Uruguay ==
Canada
3
Waldstadion T.C., Frankfurt, Germany
22 July 1993
Clay (outdoors)

Uruguay
0

			1	2	3
1	(Canada) (Uruguay)	Helen Kelesi; Patricia Miller	2; 6	6; 3	6; 2
2	(Canada) (Uruguay)	Patricia Hy; Claudia Brause	6; 2	6; 1
3	(Canada) (Uruguay)	Jill Hetherington / Rene Simpson; Claudia Brause / Patricia Miller	6; 3	6; 2

== South Korea vs. New Zealand ==
South Korea
3
Waldstadion T.C., Frankfurt, Germany
22 July 1993
Clay (outdoors)

New Zealand
0

			1	2	3
1	(South Korea) (New Zealand)	Kim Yeon-sook; Claudine Toleafoa	5; 7	6; 2	6; 4
2	(South Korea) (New Zealand)	Park Sung-hee; Julie Richardson	6; 1	6; 0
3	(South Korea) (New Zealand)	Choi Ju-yeon / Park Sung-hee; Julie Richardson / Claudine Toleafoa	6; 2	6; 1

== South Africa vs. Israel ==
South Africa
2
Waldstadion T.C., Frankfurt, Germany
22 July 1993
Clay (outdoors)

Israel
1

			1	2	3
1	(South Africa) (Israel)	Rosalyn Nideffer; Anna Smashnova	4; 6	3; 6
2	(South Africa) (Israel)	Amanda Coetzer; Yael Segal	6; 3	6; 2
3	(South Africa) (Israel)	Amanda Coetzer / Elna Reinach; Yael Segal / Limor Zaltz	6; 3	6; 0

== Germany vs. Austria ==
Germany
2
Waldstadion T.C., Frankfurt, Germany
22 July 1993
Clay (outdoors)

Austria
1

			1	2	3
1	(Germany) (Austria)	Barbara Rittner; Barbara Schett	6; 2	4; 6	8; 6
2	(Germany) (Austria)	Sabine Hack; Judith Wiesner	6; 2	6; 1
3	(Germany) (Austria)	Sabine Hack / Barbara Rittner; Sandra Dopfer / Petra Schwarz				w/o

== Colombia vs. Chile ==
Colombia
2
Waldstadion T.C., Frankfurt, Germany
22 July 1993
Clay (outdoors)

Chile
1

			1	2	3
1	(Colombia) (Chile)	Carmiña Giraldo; María-Alejandra Quezada	3; 6	2; 6
2	(Colombia) (Chile)	Cecilia Hincapié; Paula Cabezas	6; 4	6; 4
3	(Colombia) (Chile)	Carmiña Giraldo / Cecilia Hincapié; Paula Cabezas / Bárbara Castro	6; 4	2; 6	13; 11

== Croatia vs. Belgium ==
Croatia
2
Waldstadion T.C., Frankfurt, Germany
22 July 1993
Clay (outdoors)

Belgium
1

			1	2	3
1	(Croatia) (Belgium)	Maja Murić; Nancy Feber	6; 4	6; 4
2	(Croatia) (Belgium)	Nadin Ercegović; Dominique Monami	1; 6	2; 6
3	(Croatia) (Belgium)	Nadin Ercegović / Maja Murić; Laurence Courtois / Dominique Monami	4; 6	6; 3	6; 2

== Poland vs. Great Britain ==
Poland
2
Waldstadion T.C., Frankfurt, Germany
22 July 1993
Clay (outdoors)

Great Britain
1

			1	2	3
1	(Poland) (United Kingdom)	Magdalena Feistel; Jo Durie	2; 6	7; 5		retired
2	(Poland) (United Kingdom)	Katarzyna Nowak; Clare Wood	0; 4			retired
3	(Poland) (United Kingdom)	Magdalena Feistel / Katarzyna Teodorowicz-Lisowska; Julie Salmon / Clare Wood	4; 6	6; 3	6; 2

== Switzerland vs. Peru ==
Switzerland
2
Waldstadion T.C., Frankfurt, Germany
22 July 1993
Clay (outdoors)

Peru
1

			1	2	3
1	(Switzerland) (Peru)	Christelle Fauche; Pilar Vásquez	6; 4	6; 2
2	(Switzerland) (Peru)	Emanuela Zardo; Laura Gildemeister	6; 3	6; 4
3	(Switzerland) (Peru)	Geraldine Dondit / Joana Manta; Gianfranca Devercelli / Pilar Vásquez	5; 7	4; 6
