= 2017 Fed Cup World Group II =

Part of tennis tournament

The World Group II was the second highest level of Fed Cup competition in 2017. The winning nations advanced to the World Group play-offs, and the losing nations were relegated to the World Group II play-offs.

Participating teams
Australia	Belgium	Chinese Taipei	Italy
Romania	Russia	Slovakia	Ukraine

== Russia vs. Chinese Taipei ==
Russia
4
Druzhba Multipurpose Arena, Moscow, Russia
11–12 February 2017
Hard (indoors)

Chinese Taipei
1

			1	2	3
1	(Russia) (Chinese Taipei)	Ekaterina Makarova; Lee Ya-hsuan	6; 3	5; 7	6; 1
2	(Russia) (Chinese Taipei)	Anna Blinkova; Chang Kai-chen	3; 6	5; 7
3	(Russia) (Chinese Taipei)	Ekaterina Makarova; Chang Kai-chen	6; 4	7; 5
4	(Russia) (Chinese Taipei)	Natalia Vikhlyantseva; Lee Ya-hsuan	6; 1	6; 2
5	(Russia) (Chinese Taipei)	Anna Blinkova / Anna Kalinskaya; Chan Chin-wei / Hsu Ching-wen	6; 3	7; 5

== Romania vs. Belgium ==
Romania
1
Polyvalent Hall, Bucharest, Romania
11–12 February 2017
Hard (indoors)

Belgium
3

			1	2	3
1	(Romania) (Belgium)	Monica Niculescu; Kirsten Flipkens	3; 6	4; 6
2	(Romania) (Belgium)	Sorana Cîrstea; Yanina Wickmayer	6^{4} 7^{7}	7; 5	5; 7
3	(Romania) (Belgium)	Irina-Camelia Begu; Elise Mertens	6; 3	5; 7	5; 7
4	(Romania) (Belgium)	Sorana Cîrstea; Kirsten Flipkens				not played
5	(Romania) (Belgium)	Sorana Cîrstea / Monica Niculescu; Kirsten Flipkens / Maryna Zanevska	6; 2	6; 0

== Ukraine vs. Australia ==
Ukraine
3
Sports Palace "Lokomotyv", Kharkiv, Ukraine
11–12 February 2017
Hard (indoors)

Australia
1

			1	2	3
1	(Ukraine) (Australia)	Lesia Tsurenko; Daria Gavrilova	6; 2	6; 3
2	(Ukraine) (Australia)	Elina Svitolina; Ashleigh Barty	4; 6	6; 1	6; 2
3	(Ukraine) (Australia)	Elina Svitolina; Daria Gavrilova	6; 3	6; 2
4	(Ukraine) (Australia)	Lesia Tsurenko; Ashleigh Barty				not played
5	(Ukraine) (Australia)	Nadiia Kichenok / Olga Savchuk; Ashleigh Barty / Casey Dellacqua	2; 6	6; 2	8; 10

== Italy vs. Slovakia ==
Italy
2
PalaGalassi, Forlì, Italy
11–12 February 2017
Clay (indoors)

Slovakia
3

			1	2	3
1	(Italy) (Slovakia)	Francesca Schiavone; Anna Karolína Schmiedlová	6; 3	6; 1
2	(Italy) (Slovakia)	Sara Errani; Rebecca Šramková	6; 2	3; 6	4; 6
3	(Italy) (Slovakia)	Sara Errani; Daniela Hantuchová	2; 6	0; 6
4	(Italy) (Slovakia)	Francesca Schiavone; Rebecca Šramková	2; 6	4; 6
5	(Italy) (Slovakia)	Jasmine Paolini / Martina Trevisan; Anna Karolína Schmiedlová / Rebecca Šramková	5; 2			retired
