= Steven Martens =

Belgian sports executive

Steven Martens (born 25 May 1964 in Lier) is a Belgian sports executive and the ex-CEO of the Royal Belgian Football Association. He obtained a master's degree in classical philology at the Katholieke Universiteit Leuven and became a top trainer in tennis at the Flemish trainers' school Bloso. In his youth years he played football and tennis. He is a brother of the (socialist) sp.a-politician Bart Martens.

== Tennis and football ==
He became a tennis coach in 1987 within the Belgian Tennis Federation with players as Sabine Appelmans, Laurence Courtois, Kim Clijsters, Justine Henin, Kirsten Flipkens, Xavier Malisse, Olivier Rochus, Kristof Vliegen and Steve Darcis. In 1997 he was awarded the ITF Coach fair play award. Afterwards he became technical coordinator of the (Flemish) VTV training centre from 1998 to 2005, to keep the function of technical director until 2006.

Additionally, Steven Martens was captain from Belgian national tennis teams in the Fed Cup team (1993–1998) and the Davis Cup team. In 2004 he was coach from the national team at the 2004 Summer Olympics in Athens, the tournament at which Justine Henin would win Olympic tennis gold for Belgium. From 2007 on he was active as player director with the LTA (Lawn Tennis Association), the tennis federation of the United Kingdom. There, he was busy with scouting and education from younger players and coaches and he took care of the support and guidance for top players.

Martens was also a regular co-commentator during tennis matches at the Belgian public broadcast VRT.

On 1 May 2011, he was assigned as new Secretary-General (CEO) of the Royal Belgian Football Association, as successor of Jean-Marie Philips. In an interview one year after his entry as Secretary-General he explained his long-term vision to increase the Belgian interest for playing football (also the women's interest) and to improve the Belgian FA's image and Belgian stadiums.

Martens resigned on 9 February 2015 after accusations of bad management and financial losses.
