= 2016 Fed Cup World Group II =

Part of tennis tournament

The World Group II was the second highest level of Fed Cup competition in 2016. The winning nations advanced to the World Group play-offs, and the losing nations were relegated to the World Group II play-offs.

== Slovakia vs. Australia ==
Slovakia
2
Aegon Arena, Bratislava, Slovakia
6–7 February 2016
Hard (indoors)

Australia
3

			1	2	3
1	(Slovakia) (Australia)	Anna Karolína Schmiedlová; Arina Rodionova	5; 7	7; 5	6; 0
2	(Slovakia) (Australia)	Jana Čepelová; Samantha Stosur	3; 6	4; 6
3	(Slovakia) (Australia)	Anna Karolína Schmiedlová; Samantha Stosur	6^{5} 7^{7}	5; 7
4	(Slovakia) (Australia)	Dominika Cibulková; Kimberly Birrell	6; 3	6; 1
5	(Slovakia) (Australia)	Jana Čepelová / Daniela Hantuchová; Casey Dellacqua / Samantha Stosur	7; 5	1; 6	2; 6

== Serbia vs. Spain ==
Serbia
0
Kraljevo Sports Centre, Kraljevo, Serbia
6–7 February 2016
Hard (indoors)

Spain
4

			1	2	3
1	(Serbia) (Spain)	Ivana Jorović; Garbiñe Muguruza	3; 6	1; 6
2	(Serbia) (Spain)	Jelena Janković; Carla Suárez Navarro	4; 6	2; 6
3	(Serbia) (Spain)	Jelena Janković; Garbiñe Muguruza	3; 6	4; 6
4	(Serbia) (Spain)	Bojana Jovanovski; Carla Suárez Navarro				not played
5	(Serbia) (Spain)	Ivana Jorović / Nina Stojanović; Lara Arruabarrena / Lourdes Domínguez Lino	6; 4	6^{6} 7^{8}	[7] [10]

== United States vs. Poland ==
United States
4
Holua Tennis Center, Kailua Kona, United States
6–7 February 2016
Hard (outdoors)

Poland
0

			1	2	3
1	(United States) (Poland)	Sloane Stephens; Magda Linette	6; 2	6; 4
2	(United States) (Poland)	Venus Williams; Paula Kania	7; 5	6; 2
3	(United States) (Poland)	Venus Williams; Magda Linette	6; 1	6; 2
4	(United States) (Poland)	Sloane Stephens; Paula Kania				not played
5	(United States) (Poland)	Bethanie Mattek-Sands / Coco Vandeweghe; Klaudia Jans-Ignacik / Paula Kania	6; 1	7; 5

== Canada vs. Belarus ==
Canada
2
Pavillon de l'éducation physique et des sports de l'Université Laval, Québec City, Canada
6–7 February 2016
Hard (indoors)

Belarus
3

			1	2	3
1	(Canada) (Belarus)	Françoise Abanda; Aliaksandra Sasnovich	4; 6	6; 2	3; 6
2	(Canada) (Belarus)	Aleksandra Wozniak; Olga Govortsova	6; 2	6; 2
3	(Canada) (Belarus)	Françoise Abanda; Olga Govortsova	6; 4	6; 4
4	(Canada) (Belarus)	Aleksandra Wozniak; Aliaksandra Sasnovich	4; 6	4; 6
5	(Canada) (Belarus)	Gabriela Dabrowski / Carol Zhao; Olga Govortsova / Aliaksandra Sasnovich	2; 6	4; 6
