= 2014 Fed Cup Europe/Africa Zone Group I – Pool A =

Group A of the 2014 Fed Cup Europe/Africa Zone Group I was one of four pools in the Europe/Africa zone of the 2014 Fed Cup. Four teams competed in a round robin competition, with the top team and the bottom team proceeding to their respective sections of the play-offs: the top team played for advancement to the World Group II Play-offs, while the bottom team faced potential relegation to Group II.

== Standings ==
		(Belgium) BEL	(Croatia) CRO	(Netherlands) NED	(Luxembourg) LUX	RR; W–L	Match; W–L	Set; W–L	Game; W–L	Standings
16	Belgium		3–0	0–3	3–0	2–1	6–3	13–9	110–97	2
28	Croatia	0–3		0–3	3–0	1–2	3–6	9–12	96–88	3
31	Netherlands	3–0	3–0		3–0	3–0	9–0	18–2	124–67	1
55	Luxembourg	0–3	0–3	0–3		0–3	0–9	1–18	36–114	4

== Round-robin ==
=== Belgium vs. Luxembourg ===
Belgium
3
Syma Sport and Events Centre, Budapest, Hungary
4 February 2014
Hard (indoors)

Luxembourg
0

			1	2	3
1	(Belgium) (Luxembourg)	Alison Van Uytvanck; Claudine Schaul	6; 1	6^{5} 7^{7}	6; 1
2	(Belgium) (Luxembourg)	Yanina Wickmayer; Anne Kremer	6; 4	6; 4
3	(Belgium) (Luxembourg)	An-Sophie Mestach / Yanina Wickmayer; Anne Kremer / Claudine Schaul	6; 2	6; 2

=== Croatia vs. Netherlands ===
Croatia
0
Syma Sport and Events Centre, Budapest, Hungary
4 February 2014
Hard (indoors)

Netherlands
3

			1	2	3
1	(Croatia) (Netherlands)	Petra Martić; Richèl Hogenkamp	6; 4	5; 7	5; 7
2	(Croatia) (Netherlands)	Donna Vekić; Kiki Bertens	2; 6	4; 6
3	(Croatia) (Netherlands)	Darija Jurak / Petra Martić; Kiki Bertens / Michaëlla Krajicek	5; 7	2; 6

=== Belgium vs. Netherlands ===
Belgium
0
Syma Sport and Events Centre, Budapest, Hungary
5 February 2014
Hard (indoors)

Netherlands
3

			1	2	3
1	(Belgium) (Netherlands)	An-Sophie Mestach; Richèl Hogenkamp	5; 7	3; 6
2	(Belgium) (Netherlands)	Yanina Wickmayer; Kiki Bertens	2; 6	5; 7
3	(Belgium) (Netherlands)	An-Sophie Mestach / Alison Van Uytvanck; Lesley Kerkhove / Michaëlla Krajicek	3; 6	7^{7} 6^{4}	6^{5} 7^{7}

=== Croatia vs. Luxembourg ===
Croatia
3
Syma Sport and Events Centre, Budapest, Hungary
5 February 2014
Hard (indoors)

Luxembourg
0

			1	2	3
1	(Croatia) (Luxembourg)	Petra Martić; Claudine Schaul	6; 2	6; 2
2	(Croatia) (Luxembourg)	Donna Vekić; Anne Kremer	6; 1	6; 2
3	(Croatia) (Luxembourg)	Darija Jurak / Petra Martić; Tiffany Cornelius / Sharon Pesch	6; 1	6; 0

=== Belgium vs. Croatia ===
Belgium
3
Syma Sport and Events Centre, Budapest, Hungary
7 February 2014
Hard (indoors)

Croatia
0

			1	2	3
1	(Belgium) (Croatia)	Alison Van Uytvanck; Tereza Mrdeža	6; 4	1; 6	6; 2
2	(Belgium) (Croatia)	Yanina Wickmayer; Donna Vekić	6; 3	6; 2
3	(Belgium) (Croatia)	Alison Van Uytvanck / Yanina Wickmayer; Darija Jurak / Tereza Mrdeža	0; 6	6; 4	6; 4

=== Netherlands vs. Luxembourg ===
Netherlands
3
Syma Sport and Events Centre, Budapest, Hungary
7 February 2014
Hard (indoors)

Luxembourg
0

			1	2	3
1	(Netherlands) (Luxembourg)	Richèl Hogenkamp; Sharon Pesch	6; 3	6; 1
2	(Netherlands) (Luxembourg)	Kiki Bertens; Tiffany Cornelius	6; 1	6; 1
3	(Netherlands) (Luxembourg)	Lesley Kerkhove / Michaëlla Krajicek; Tiffany Cornelius / Sharon Pesch	6; 1	6; 0
