= 2016 Fed Cup Europe/Africa Zone Group I – Pool D =

Teams in regional women's tennis competition

Pool D of the 2016 Fed Cup Europe/Africa Zone Group I was one of four pools in the Europe/Africa zone of the 2016 Fed Cup. Four teams competed in a round robin competition, with the top team and the bottom team proceeding to their respective sections of the play-offs: the top team played for advancement to the World Group II Play-offs, while the bottom team faced potential relegation to Group II.

== Standings ==
| | | (Hungary) HUN | (Belgium) BEL | (Bulgaria) BUL | (Latvia) LAT | RR; W–L | Set; W–L | Game; W–L | Standings |
| 26 | Hungary | | 0–3 | 1–2 | 1–2 | 0–3 | 5–14 | 64–97 | 4 |
| 33 | Belgium | 3–0 | | 3–0 | 3–0 | 3–0 | 12–2 | 123–63 | 1 |
| 42 | Bulgaria | 2–1 | 0–3 | | 2–1 | 2–1 | 11–11 | 97–88 | 2 |
| 52 | Latvia | 2–1 | 0–3 | 1–2 | | 1–2 | 8–13 | 69–102 | 3 |

== Round-robin ==
=== Hungary vs. Bulgaria ===
Hungary
1
Municipal Tennis Centre, Eilat, Israel
3 February 2016
Hard (outdoors)

Bulgaria
2

| | | | 1 | 2 | 3 |
|---|---|---|---|---|---|
| 1 | (Hungary) (Bulgaria) | Dalma Gálfi; Elitsa Kostova | 5; 7 | 2; 6 |
| 2 | (Hungary) (Bulgaria) | Réka-Luca Jani; Tsvetana Pironkova | 1; 6 | 1; 6 |
| 3 | (Hungary) (Bulgaria) | Dalma Gálfi / Fanny Stollár; Dia Evtimova / Isabella Shinikova | 6; 3 | 6; 1 |

=== Belgium vs. Latvia ===
Belgium
3
Municipal Tennis Centre, Eilat, Israel
3 February 2016
Hard (outdoors)

Latvia
0

| | | | 1 | 2 | 3 |
|---|---|---|---|---|---|
| 1 | (Belgium) (Latvia) | Ysaline Bonaventure; Diāna Marcinkēviča | 6; 3 | 6; 2 |
| 2 | (Belgium) (Latvia) | Alison Van Uytvanck; Jeļena Ostapenko | 6; 2 | 3; 6 | 6; 1 |
| 3 | (Belgium) (Latvia) | Ysaline Bonaventure / An-Sophie Mestach; Dārta-Elizabete Emuliņa / Anna Ozerova | 6; 0 | 6; 1 |

=== Hungary vs. Belgium ===
Hungary
0
Municipal Tennis Centre, Eilat, Israel
4 February 2016
Hard (outdoors)

Belgium
3

| | | | 1 | 2 | 3 |
|---|---|---|---|---|---|
| 1 | (Hungary) (Belgium) | Fanny Stollár; Ysaline Bonaventure | 1; 6 | 2; 6 |
| 2 | (Hungary) (Belgium) | Anna Bondár; Alison Van Uytvanck | 1; 6 | 3; 6 |
| 3 | (Hungary) (Belgium) | Dalma Gálfi / Réka-Luca Jani; Ysaline Bonaventure / An-Sophie Mestach | 6; 3 | 2; 6 | 2; 6 |

=== Bulgaria vs. Latvia ===
Bulgaria
2
Municipal Tennis Centre, Eilat, Israel
4 February 2016
Hard (outdoors)

Latvia
1

| | | | 1 | 2 | 3 |
|---|---|---|---|---|---|
| 1 | (Bulgaria) (Latvia) | Elitsa Kostova; Diāna Marcinkēviča | 2; 6 | 6; 3 | 6; 3 |
| 2 | (Bulgaria) (Latvia) | Tsvetana Pironkova; Jeļena Ostapenko | 6; 0 | 6; 2 |
| 3 | (Bulgaria) (Latvia) | Dia Evtimova / Isabella Shinikova; Diāna Marcinkēviča / Jeļena Ostapenko | 6; 4 | 0; 6 | 5; 7 |

=== Hungary vs. Latvia ===
Hungary
1
Municipal Tennis Centre, Eilat, Israel
5 February 2016
Hard (outdoors)

Latvia
2

| | | | 1 | 2 | 3 |
|---|---|---|---|---|---|
| 1 | (Hungary) (Latvia) | Anna Bondár; Diāna Marcinkēviča | 6; 4 | 6; 4 |
| 2 | (Hungary) (Latvia) | Réka-Luca Jani; Jeļena Ostapenko | 3; 6 | 2; 6 |
| 3 | (Hungary) (Latvia) | Dalma Gálfi / Réka-Luca Jani; Diāna Marcinkēviča / Jeļena Ostapenko | 6^{2} 7^{7} | 3; 6 |

=== Belgium vs. Bulgaria ===
Belgium
3
Municipal Tennis Centre, Eilat, Israel
5 February 2016
Hard (outdoors)

Bulgaria
0

| | | | 1 | 2 | 3 |
|---|---|---|---|---|---|
| 1 | (Belgium) (Bulgaria) | Ysaline Bonaventure; Elitsa Kostova | 6; 3 | 3; 6 | 6; 3 |
| 2 | (Belgium) (Bulgaria) | Alison Van Uytvanck; Tsvetana Pironkova | 6; 4 | 6; 2 |
| 3 | (Belgium) (Bulgaria) | Marie Benoît / An-Sophie Mestach; Dia Evtimova / Isabella Shinikova | 6^{4} 7^{7} | 6; 2 | 6; 4 |
