= 2019 Fed Cup World Group =

Part of tennis tournament

- Date: 9 February – 10 November
- Edition: 29th

Champions
- France
- Fed Cup

The World Group was the highest level of Fed Cup competition in 2019.

== Participating teams ==
Participating teams
Australia	Belarus	Belgium	Czech Republic
France	Germany	Romania	United States

=== Seeds ===
1. Czech Republic (quarterfinals)
2. United States (quarterfinals)
3. Belarus (semifinals)
4. France (champions)

=== Draw ===
Quarterfinals; 9–10 February
Ostrava, Czech Republic (hard, indoor)
1	Czech Republic	2
Romania	3
Liège, Belgium (hard, indoor)
4	France	3
Belgium	1
Braunschweig, Germany (hard, indoor)
Germany	0
3	Belarus	4
Asheville, United States (hard, indoor)
Australia	3
2	United States	2

Semifinals; 20–21 April
Rouen, France (clay, indoor)
Romania	2
4	France	3
Brisbane, Australia (hard)
3	Belarus	2
Australia	3

Final; 9–10 November
Perth, Australia (hard)
4	France	3
Australia	2

== Quarterfinals ==
=== Czech Republic vs. Romania ===
Czech Republic
2
Ostravar Aréna, Ostrava, Czech Republic
9–10 February
Hard (indoor)

Romania
3

			1	2	3
1	(Czech Republic) (Romania)	Karolína Plíšková; Mihaela Buzărnescu	6; 1	6; 4
2	(Czech Republic) (Romania)	Kateřina Siniaková; Simona Halep	4; 6	0; 6
3	(Czech Republic) (Romania)	Karolína Plíšková; Simona Halep	4; 6	7; 5	4; 6
4	(Czech Republic) (Romania)	Kateřina Siniaková; Mihaela Buzărnescu	6; 4	6; 2
5	(Czech Republic) (Romania)	Barbora Krejčíková / Kateřina Siniaková; Irina-Camelia Begu / Monica Niculescu	7^{7} 6^{2}	4; 6	4; 6

=== Belgium vs. France ===
Belgium
1
Country Hall Liège, Liège, Belgium
9–10 February
Hard (indoor)

France
3

			1	2	3
1	(Belgium) (France)	Alison Van Uytvanck; Caroline Garcia	6^{2} 7^{7}	6; 4	2; 6
2	(Belgium) (France)	Elise Mertens; Alizé Cornet	6^{6} 7^{8}	2; 6
3	(Belgium) (France)	Elise Mertens; Caroline Garcia	2; 6	3; 6
4	(Belgium) (France)	Alison Van Uytvanck; Alizé Cornet				not played
5	(Belgium) (France)	Ysaline Bonaventure / Kirsten Flipkens; Fiona Ferro / Pauline Parmentier	6; 3	3; 6	10; 6

=== Germany vs. Belarus ===
Germany
0
Volkswagen Halle, Braunschweig, Germany
9–10 February
Hard (indoor)

Belarus
4

			1	2	3
1	(Germany) (Belarus)	Tatjana Maria; Aliaksandra Sasnovich	6^{3} 7^{7}	3; 6
2	(Germany) (Belarus)	Andrea Petkovic; Aryna Sabalenka	2; 6	1; 6
3	(Germany) (Belarus)	Laura Siegemund; Aryna Sabalenka	1; 6	1; 6
4	(Germany) (Belarus)	Andrea Petkovic; Aliaksandra Sasnovich				not played
5	(Germany) (Belarus)	Mona Barthel / Anna-Lena Grönefeld; Victoria Azarenka / Lidziya Marozava	1; 6	6; 0	9; 11

=== United States vs. Australia ===
United States
2
U.S. Cellular Center, Asheville, United States
9–10 February
Hard (indoor)

Australia
3

			1	2	3
1	(United States) (Australia)	Sofia Kenin; Ashleigh Barty	1; 6	6^{2} 7^{7}
2	(United States) (Australia)	Madison Keys; Kimberly Birrell	6; 2	6; 2
3	(United States) (Australia)	Madison Keys; Ashleigh Barty	4; 6	1; 6
4	(United States) (Australia)	Danielle Collins; Daria Gavrilova	6; 1	3; 6	6; 2
5	(United States) (Australia)	Danielle Collins / Nicole Melichar; Ashleigh Barty / Priscilla Hon	4; 6	5; 7

== Semifinals ==
=== France vs. Romania ===
France
3
Kindarena, Rouen, France
20–21 April
Clay (indoor)

Romania
2

			1	2	3
1	(France) (Romania)	Kristina Mladenovic; Simona Halep	3; 6	1; 6
2	(France) (Romania)	Caroline Garcia; Mihaela Buzărnescu	6; 3	6; 3
3	(France) (Romania)	Caroline Garcia; Simona Halep	7^{8} 6^{6}	3; 6	4; 6
4	(France) (Romania)	Pauline Parmentier; Irina-Camelia Begu	6; 3	2; 6	6; 2
5	(France) (Romania)	Caroline Garcia / Kristina Mladenovic; Simona Halep / Monica Niculescu	5; 7	6; 3	6; 4

=== Australia vs. Belarus ===
Australia
3
Queensland Tennis Centre, Brisbane, Australia
20–21 April
Hard

Belarus
2

			1	2	3
1	(Australia) (Belarus)	Samantha Stosur; Aryna Sabalenka	5; 7	7; 5	3; 6
2	(Australia) (Belarus)	Ashleigh Barty; Victoria Azarenka	7^{7} 6^{2}	6; 3
3	(Australia) (Belarus)	Ashleigh Barty; Aryna Sabalenka	6; 2	6; 2
4	(Australia) (Belarus)	Samantha Stosur; Victoria Azarenka	1; 6	1; 6
5	(Australia) (Belarus)	Ashleigh Barty / Samantha Stosur; Aryna Sabalenka / Victoria Azarenka	7; 5	3; 6	6; 2

== Final ==
=== Australia vs. France ===
Australia
2
RAC Arena, Perth, Australia
9–10 November
Hard

France
3

			1	2	3
1	(Australia) (France)	Ajla Tomljanović; Kristina Mladenovic	1; 6	1; 6
2	(Australia) (France)	Ashleigh Barty; Caroline Garcia	6; 0	6; 0
3	(Australia) (France)	Ashleigh Barty; Kristina Mladenovic	6; 2	4; 6	6^{1} 7^{7}
4	(Australia) (France)	Ajla Tomljanović; Pauline Parmentier	6; 4	7; 5
5	(Australia) (France)	Ashleigh Barty / Samantha Stosur; Caroline Garcia / Kristina Mladenovic	4; 6	3; 6
