= 1963 Federation Cup (tennis) =

International women's tennis competition

Details
- Duration: 17 – 20 June
- Edition: 1st

Champion
- Winning nation: United States

The 1963 Federation Cup was the first edition of what is now known as the Fed Cup. The tournament was created provide a team competition for women, similar to the Davis Cup men's competition. 16 nations participated in the first event, which was held at the Queen's Club in London, United Kingdom from 17–20 June. United States won the first title, defeating Australia in the final.

== Participating teams ==
Participating Teams
Australia	Austria	Belgium	Canada
Czechoslovakia	Denmark	France	Great Britain
Hungary	Italy	Netherlands	Norway
South Africa	Switzerland	United States	West Germany

== Draw ==
All ties were played at the Queen's Club in London, United Kingdom on grass courts.

First round 17 June
Australia	3
Belgium	0
Hungary	3
Denmark	0
South Africa	2
Czechoslovakia	1
France	2
West Germany	1
Norway	1
Austria	2
Canada	0
Great Britain	3
Switzerland	0
Netherlands	3
Italy	0
United States	3

Quarterfinals; 18 June
Australia	3
Hungary	0
South Africa	3
France	0
Austria	0
Great Britain	3
Netherlands	0
United States	3

Semifinals; 19 June
Australia	3
South Africa	0
Great Britain	0
United States	3

Final; 20 June
Australia	1
United States	2

=== First round ===
Australia vs. Belgium

Australia
3
Queen's Club, London, United Kingdom
17 June 1963
Grass

Belgium
0

			1	2	3
1	(Australia) (Belgium)	Margaret Smith; Christiane Mercelis	6; 3	6; 1
2	(Australia) (Belgium)	Jan Lehane; Elza Bellens	6; 0	6; 3
3	(Australia) (Belgium)	Margaret Smith / Lesley Turner; Mary Marechal / Christiane Mercelis	6; 1	6; 0

Hungary vs. Denmark

Hungary
3
Queen's Club, London, United Kingdom
17 June 1963
Grass

Denmark
0

			1	2	3
1	(Hungary) (Denmark)	Zsuzsa Körmöczy; Pia Balling	6; 4	6; 0
2	(Hungary) (Denmark)	Zsófia Broszmann; Vera Johansen	7; 5	6; 4
3	(Hungary) (Denmark)	Klara Bardóczy / Zsófia Broszmann; Pia Balling / Vera Johansen	6; 2	3; 6	6; 3

South Africa vs. Czechoslovakia

South Africa
2
Queen's Club, London, United Kingdom
17 June 1963
Grass

Czechoslovakia
1

			1	2	3
1	(South Africa) (Czechoslovakia)	Renée Schuurman; Věra Suková	3; 6	6; 2	6; 8
2	(South Africa) (Czechoslovakia)	Margaret Hunt; Markéta Prochová	6; 2	6; 2
3	(South Africa) (Czechoslovakia)	Margaret Hunt / Renée Schuurman; Markéta Prochová / Věra Suková	6; 3	6; 2

France vs. West Germany

France
2
Queen's Club, London, United Kingdom
17 June 1963
Grass

West Germany
1

			1	2	3
1	(France) (West Germany)	Françoise Dürr; Edda Buding	3; 6	4; 6
2	(France) (West Germany)	Janine Lieffrig; Margot Dittmeyer	6; 3	4; 6	6; 2
3	(France) (West Germany)	Françoise Dürr / Janine Lieffrig; Edda Buding / Renate Ostermann	6; 3	6; 3

Norway vs. Austria

Norway
1
Queen's Club, London, United Kingdom
17 June 1963
Grass

Austria
2

			1	2	3
1	(Norway) (Austria)	Liv Paldan; Sonja Pachta	3; 6	2; 6
2	(Norway) (Austria)	Ruth Hauknes; Andrea Winkler	6; 4	6; 3
3	(Norway) (Austria)	Liv Paldan / Tone Schirmer; Edda Herdy / Sonja Pachta	3; 6	3; 6

Canada vs. Great Britain

Canada
0
Queen's Club, London, United Kingdom
17 June 1963
Grass

Great Britain
3

			1	2	3
1	(Canada) (United Kingdom)	Ann Barclay; Ann Jones	0; 6	1; 6
2	(Canada) (United Kingdom)	Louise Brown; Christine Truman	6; 8	3; 6
3	(Canada) (United Kingdom)	Ann Barclay / Louise Brown; Ann Jones / Christine Truman	1; 6	3; 6

Switzerland vs. Netherlands

Switzerland
0
Queen's Club, London, United Kingdom
17 June 1963
Grass

Netherlands
3

			1	2	3
1	(Switzerland) (Netherlands)	Alice Wavre; Eva de Jong	1; 6	4; 6
2	(Switzerland) (Netherlands)	Janine Bourgnon; Jenny Ridderhof	6; 8	3; 6
3	(Switzerland) (Netherlands)	Janine Bourgnon / Anne-Marie Studer; Eva de Jong / Jenny Ridderhof	1; 6	3; 6

Italy vs. United States

Italy
0
Queen's Club, London, United Kingdom
17 June 1963
Grass

United States
3

			1	2	3
1	(Italy) (United States)	Lea Pericoli; Darlene Hard	4; 6	6; 2	2; 6
2	(Italy) (United States)	Silvana Lazzarino; Billie Jean Moffitt	8; 6	1; 6	2; 6
3	(Italy) (United States)	Silvana Lazzarino / Lea Pericoli; Carole Caldwell / Darlene Hard	4; 6	1; 6

=== Quarterfinals ===
Australia vs. Hungary

Australia
3
Queen's Club, London, United Kingdom
18 June 1963
Grass

Hungary
0

			1	2	3
1	(Australia) (Hungary)	Margaret Smith; Zsuzsa Körmöczy	6; 0	6; 1
2	(Australia) (Hungary)	Jan Lehane; Zsófia Broszmann	6; 1	6; 2
3	(Australia) (Hungary)	Margaret Smith / Lesley Turner; Klara Bardóczy / Zsófia Broszmann	6; 1	6; 1

South Africa vs. France

South Africa
3
Queen's Club, London, United Kingdom
18 June 1963
Grass

France
0

			1	2	3
1	(South Africa) (France)	Renée Schuurman; Françoise Dürr	6; 3	3; 6	6; 3
2	(South Africa) (France)	Margaret Hunt; Janine Lieffrig	6; 4	5; 7	6; 2
3	(South Africa) (France)	Margaret Hunt / Renée Schuurman; Françoise Dürr / Janine Lieffrig	7; 5	6; 1

Austria vs. Great Britain

Austria
0
Queen's Club, London, United Kingdom
18 June 1963
Grass

Great Britain
3

			1	2	3
1	(Austria) (United Kingdom)	Sonja Pachta; Christine Truman	2; 6	1; 6
2	(Austria) (United Kingdom)	Andrea Winkler; Deidre Catt	2; 6	3; 6
3	(Austria) (United Kingdom)	Edda Herdy / Sonja Pachta; Ann Jones / Christine Truman	1; 6	0; 6

Netherlands vs. United States

Netherlands
0
Queen's Club, London, United Kingdom
18 June 1963
Grass

United States
3

			1	2	3
1	(Netherlands) (United States)	Eva de Jong; Darlene Hard	2; 6	2; 6
2	(Netherlands) (United States)	Jenny Ridderhof; Billie Jean Moffitt	2; 6	2; 6
3	(Netherlands) (United States)	Eva de Jong / Jenny Ridderhof; Carole Caldwell / Billie Jean Moffitt	0; 6	3; 6

=== Semifinals ===
Australia vs. South Africa

Australia
3
Queen's Club, London, United Kingdom
19 June 1963
Grass

South Africa
0

			1	2	3
1	(Australia) (South Africa)	Margaret Smith; Renée Schuurman	6; 3	6; 2
2	(Australia) (South Africa)	Jan Lehane; Margaret Hunt	4; 6	9; 7	6; 1
3	(Australia) (South Africa)	Margaret Smith / Lesley Turner; Margaret Hunt / Renée Schuurman	5; 7	6; 3	6; 3

Great Britain vs. United States

Great Britain
0
Queen's Club, London, United Kingdom
19 June 1963
Grass

United States
3

			1	2	3
1	(United Kingdom) (United States)	Ann Jones; Darlene Hard	2; 6	4; 6
2	(United Kingdom) (United States)	Christine Truman; Billie Jean Moffitt	3; 6	6; 3	4; 6
3	(United Kingdom) (United States)	Ann Jones / Christine Truman; Carole Caldwell / Darlene Hard	6; 2	7; 9	3; 6

=== Final ===
Australia
1
Queen's Club, London, United Kingdom
20 June 1963
Wood (indoors) (Note: The final was switched from the outdoor grass courts to an indoor wood court due to the threat of bad weather.)

United States
2

			1	2	3
1	(Australia) (United States)	Margaret Smith; Darlene Hard	6; 3	6; 0
2	(Australia) (United States)	Lesley Turner; Billie Jean Moffitt	7; 5	0; 6	3; 6
3	(Australia) (United States)	Margaret Smith / Lesley Turner; Darlene Hard / Billie Jean Moffitt	6; 3	11; 13	3; 6
