= 1999 Fed Cup World Group II =

International women's tennis competition

The World Group II was the second highest level of Fed Cup competition in 1999. Winning nations advanced to the 2000 World Group, and the losing nations were demoted to the World Group II Play-offs.

== Netherlands vs. Belgium ==
Netherlands
0
Brabant Hall, 's-Hertogenbosch, Netherlands
17–18 April 1999
Supreme carpet (indoors)

Belgium
5

			1	2	3
1	(Netherlands) (Belgium)	Amanda Hopmans; Dominique Van Roost	1; 6	7^{7} 6^{4}	5; 7
2	(Netherlands) (Belgium)	Miriam Oremans; Justine Henin	7; 5	5; 7	3; 6
3	(Netherlands) (Belgium)	Miriam Oremans; Els Callens	1; 6	6^{6} 7^{8}
4	(Netherlands) (Belgium)	Amanda Hopmans; Justine Henin	4; 6	3; 6
5	(Netherlands) (Belgium)	Amanda Hopmans / Miriam Oremans; Sabine Appelmans / Els Callens	6; 2	3; 6	4; 6

== Belarus vs. Czech Republic ==
Belarus
1
National Centre, Minsk, Belarus
17–18 April 1999
Supreme clay (indoors)

Czech Republic
4

			1	2	3
1	(Belarus) (Czech Republic)	Olga Barabanschikova; Květa Hrdličková	1; 6	4; 6
2	(Belarus) (Czech Republic)	Natasha Zvereva; Denisa Chládková	3; 6	6^{3} 7^{7}
3	(Belarus) (Czech Republic)	Natasha Zvereva; Květa Hrdličková	4; 6	7^{10} 6^{8}	4; 6
4	(Belarus) (Czech Republic)	Olga Barabanschikova; Denisa Chládková	3; 6	4; 6
5	(Belarus) (Czech Republic)	Nadejda Ostrovskaya / Tatiana Poutchek; Dája Bedáňová / Helena Vildová	7; 5	6; 2

== Austria vs. Australia ==
Austria
3
Sports Union, Klagenfurt, Austria
17–18 April 1999
Red clay (outdoors)

Australia
2

			1	2	3
1	(Austria) (Australia)	Barbara Schett; Jelena Dokić	3; 6	7; 5	4; 6
2	(Austria) (Australia)	Sylvia Plischke; Alicia Molik	7; 5	1; 6	5; 7
3	(Austria) (Australia)	Barbara Schett; Alicia Molik	6; 1	6; 1
4	(Austria) (Australia)	Barbara Schwartz; Jelena Dokić	1; 6	6; 2	6; 4
5	(Austria) (Australia)	Barbara Schett / Barbara Schwartz; Alicia Molik / Rennae Stubbs	6; 3	6; 3

== Germany vs. Japan ==
Germany
3
National Centre, Hamburg, Germany
24–25 April 1999
Red clay (outdoors)

Japan
2

			1	2	3
1	(Germany) (Japan)	Andrea Glass; Miho Saeki	6; 3	6; 4
2	(Germany) (Japan)	Elena Wagner; Shinobu Asagoe	6^{6} 7^{8}	1; 6
3	(Germany) (Japan)	Andrea Glass; Shinobu Asagoe	6; 4	6; 3
4	(Germany) (Japan)	Elena Wagner; Miho Saeki	7^{10} 6^{8}	6; 3
5	(Germany) (Japan)	Andrea Glass / Jana Kandarr; Shinobu Asagoe / Saori Obata	6; 3	5; 7	4; 6

== See also ==
- Fed Cup structure
- Calendar - Fed Cup - Draws & Results
