= Romanian Tennis Federation =

Governing body of tennis in Romania

Romanian Tennis Federation Federația Română de Tenis
- Formation: 1912
- Headquarters: Bucharest
- Location: Romania
- President: George Cosac
- Website: Official

The Romanian Tennis Federation (FRT) (Romanian: Federația Română de Tenis) is the governing body of tennis in Romania founded in 1912, and became a member of the International Tennis Federation (ITF) in the same year. It is based in Bucharest and its current president is former Romanian tennis player George Cosac.

It also organizes the Romania Davis Cup team and the Romania Billie Jean King Cup team.
