= Royal Belgian Tennis Federation =

- Sport: Tennis
- Abbreviation: (KBTB/FRBT)
- Founded: 1902
- Location: Ixelles, Brussels
- Chairman: Dirk De Maseneer

Official website
- www.rbtf.be
- (Belgium)

The Royal Belgian Tennis Federation (Dutch: Koninklijke Belgische Tennisbond; French: Fédération Royale Belge de Tennis) is an organisation set up in 1902 that formally takes charge of tennis in Belgium. From 1979 on, most tasks are executed by the tennis branches of the Flemish and Francophone Communities. The Belgian Federation is one of the 15 inaugural members of the International Tennis Federation. Its headquarters are located in the Brussels Capital Region, in the municipality of Ixelles.

== History ==
On 23 March 1902 the Belgian Lawn Tennis League was founded by 12 tennis clubs. In 1914 the name was changed into Belgian Lawn Tennis Federation and in 1931 the predicate "Royal" was added.

Former logo

Since 1979, all tennis administration - including the organisation, co-ordination and promotion of tennis - is taken care of by the local leagues of the respective Flemish and Francophone Communities. Tennis Vlaanderen (previously Vlaamse Tennisvereniging) is the Flemish wing, and Association Francophone de Tennis is the association of French-speaking Belgium.

== Organisation ==
The roles of the separate Flemish and Francophone leagues include organising tennis competitions in Belgium, supporting and co-ordinating tennis clubs. At the national level only the Belgian championships for the youth (de Borman Cup) and for veterans are still organised. Since 2005 the Belgian championships for men's and women's tennis are not organised anymore.

At the international level the following tournament delegations are composed by the Belgian Tennis Federation:

- Belgian team at the Davis Cup
- Belgian team at the Fed Cup
- Belgian team at the Hopman Cup

If there are games from these tournaments that take place in Belgium, these are alternately organised by Tennis Vlaanderen and the Association Francophone de Tennis.

== Chairmen ==
- 1902 – 1919 Armand Solvay
- 1919 – 1924 Albert Lefèbvre–Giron
- 1924 – 1948 Paul de Borman
- 1948 – 1956 Oscar Bossaert
- 1956 – 1974 Marcel Stas de Richelle
- 1974 – 1979 Pierre Geelhand de Merxem
- 1979 – 1981 Jean-Pierre De Bodt
- 1982 – 1982 Roger Tourlamain
- 1982 – 1990 Pierre-Paul De Keghel
- 1990 – 1995 Henri Denis
- 1995 – 2000 Pierre-Paul De Keghel
- 2000 – 2005 Yves Freson
- 2005 – 2005 Pierre-Paul De Keghel
- 2006 – 2010 Luc Vandaele
- 2010 – Yves Freson
- 2015 – Luc Vandaele
- 2017 – André Stein
- 2019 – Dirk De Maseneer (current)
