= Mary Marechal =

Belgian tennis player

- Country (sports): Belgium

Singles

Grand Slam singles results
- French Open: 2R (1963)

Doubles

Grand Slam doubles results
- French Open: 1R (1963)
- Wimbledon: 2R (1962)

Mary Marechal was a female Belgian tennis player who has represented Belgium in the Federation Cup in 1963, and also played in Wimbledon. She also represented Belgium in hockey in the 1960 World Cup. She is wife to Christopher Penn, mother to 4 (Erica, Sophie, Bella and Victoria) and grandmother to 12 (Benjamin, Oliver, Rebecca, Natalie, Sally, Patrick, Emily, Thomas, Elizabeth, William, Samuel and Phoebe).
