= 2018 Fed Cup World Group =

Part of tennis tournament

- Date: 10 February – 11 November
- Edition: 28th

Champions
- Czech Republic
- Fed Cup

The World Group was the highest level of Fed Cup competition in 2018.

== Participating teams ==
Participating teams
Belarus	Belgium	Czech Republic	France
Germany	Netherlands	Switzerland	United States

=== Seeds ===
1. Belarus (quarterfinals)
2. United States (final)
3. Czech Republic (champions)
4. France (semifinals)

=== Draw ===
Quarterfinals; 10–11 February
Minsk, Belarus (hard, indoor)
1	Belarus	2
Germany	3
Prague, Czech Republic (hard, indoor)
3	Czech Republic	3
Switzerland	1
La Roche-sur-Yon, France (hard, indoor)
Belgium	2
4	France	3
Asheville, United States (hard, indoor)
Netherlands	1
2	United States	3

Semifinals; 21–22 April
Stuttgart, Germany (clay, indoor)
Germany	1
3	Czech Republic	4
Aix-en-Provence, France (clay, indoor)
4	France	2
2	United States	3

Final; 10–11 November
Prague, Czech Republic (hard, indoor)
3	Czech Republic	3
2	United States	0

== Quarterfinals ==
=== Belarus vs. Germany ===
Belarus
2
Chizhovka-Arena, Minsk, Belarus
10–11 February
Hard (indoor)

Germany
3

			1	2	3
1	(Belarus) (Germany)	Aryna Sabalenka; Tatjana Maria	4; 6	6; 1	6; 2
2	(Belarus) (Germany)	Aliaksandra Sasnovich; Antonia Lottner	5; 7	4; 6
3	(Belarus) (Germany)	Vera Lapko; Tatjana Maria	4; 6	7; 5	0; 6
4	(Belarus) (Germany)	Aryna Sabalenka; Antonia Lottner	6; 3	5; 7	6; 2
5	(Belarus) (Germany)	Lidziya Marozava / Aryna Sabalenka; Anna-Lena Grönefeld / Tatjana Maria	7^{7} 6^{4}	5; 7	4; 6

=== Czech Republic vs. Switzerland ===
Czech Republic
3
O2 Arena, Prague, Czech Republic
10–11 February
Hard (indoor)

Switzerland
1

			1	2	3
1	(Czech Republic) (Switzerland)	Petra Kvitová; Viktorija Golubic	6; 2	1; 6	6; 3
2	(Czech Republic) (Switzerland)	Barbora Strýcová; Belinda Bencic	6; 2	6; 4
3	(Czech Republic) (Switzerland)	Petra Kvitová; Belinda Bencic	6; 2	6; 4
4	(Czech Republic) (Switzerland)	Barbora Strýcová; Viktorija Golubic				not played
5	(Czech Republic) (Switzerland)	Lucie Šafářová / Barbora Strýcová; Timea Bacsinszky / Jil Teichmann	6; 1	4; 6	[8] [10]

=== France vs. Belgium ===
France
3
Vendéspace, La Roche-sur-Yon, France
10–11 February
Hard (indoor)

Belgium
2

			1	2	3
1	(France) (Belgium)	Pauline Parmentier; Elise Mertens	2; 6	1; 6
2	(France) (Belgium)	Kristina Mladenovic; Kirsten Flipkens	6; 2	6; 4
3	(France) (Belgium)	Kristina Mladenovic; Elise Mertens	6; 4	6; 4
4	(France) (Belgium)	Pauline Parmentier; Alison Van Uytvanck	1; 6	3; 6
5	(France) (Belgium)	Amandine Hesse / Kristina Mladenovic; Kirsten Flipkens / Elise Mertens	6; 4	2; 6	6; 2

=== United States vs. Netherlands ===
United States
3
US Cellular Arena, Asheville, United States
10–11 February
Hard (indoor)

Netherlands
1

			1	2	3
1	(United States) (Netherlands)	Venus Williams; Arantxa Rus	6; 1	6; 4
2	(United States) (Netherlands)	CoCo Vandeweghe; Richèl Hogenkamp	4; 6	7^{8} 6^{6}	6; 3
3	(United States) (Netherlands)	Venus Williams; Richèl Hogenkamp	7; 5	6; 1
4	(United States) (Netherlands)	CoCo Vandeweghe; Arantxa Rus				not played
5	(United States) (Netherlands)	Serena Williams / Venus Williams; Lesley Kerkhove / Demi Schuurs	2; 6	3; 6

== Semifinals ==
=== Germany vs. Czech Republic ===
Germany
1
Porsche-Arena, Stuttgart, Germany
21–22 April
Clay (indoor)

Czech Republic
4

			1	2	3
1	(Germany) (Czech Republic)	Julia Görges; Petra Kvitová	3; 6	2; 6
2	(Germany) (Czech Republic)	Angelique Kerber; Karolína Plíšková	5; 7	3; 6
3	(Germany) (Czech Republic)	Julia Görges; Karolína Plíšková	6; 4	6; 2
4	(Germany) (Czech Republic)	Angelique Kerber; Petra Kvitová	2; 6	2; 6
5	(Germany) (Czech Republic)	Julia Görges / Anna-Lena Grönefeld; Kateřina Siniaková / Barbora Strýcová	5; 7	0; 0		retired

=== France vs. United States ===
France
2
Arena du Pays d'Aix, Aix-en-Provence, France
21–22 April
Clay (indoor)

United States
3

			1	2	3
1	(France) (United States)	Pauline Parmentier; Sloane Stephens	6^{3} 7^{7}	5; 7
2	(France) (United States)	Kristina Mladenovic; CoCo Vandeweghe	1; 6	6; 3	6; 2
3	(France) (United States)	Kristina Mladenovic; Sloane Stephens	2; 6	0; 6
4	(France) (United States)	Pauline Parmentier; Madison Keys	6^{4} 7^{7}	4; 6
5	(France) (United States)	Amandine Hesse / Kristina Mladenovic; Bethanie Mattek-Sands / CoCo Vandeweghe	6; 4	3; 6	10; 6

== Final ==
=== Czech Republic vs. United States ===
Czech Republic
3
O2 Arena, Prague, Czech Republic
10–11 November 2018
Hard (indoors)

United States
0

			1	2	3
1	(Czech Republic) (United States)	Barbora Strýcová; Sofia Kenin	6^{5} 7^{7}	6; 1	6; 4
2	(Czech Republic) (United States)	Kateřina Siniaková; Alison Riske	6; 3	7^{7} 6^{2}
3	(Czech Republic) (United States)	Kateřina Siniaková; Sofia Kenin	7; 5	5; 7	7; 5
4	(Czech Republic) (United States)	Barbora Strýcová; Alison Riske				not played
5	(Czech Republic) (United States)	Kateřina Siniaková / Barbora Krejčíková; Danielle Collins / Nicole Melichar				not played
