= 2016 Fed Cup World Group II play-offs =

Part of tennis tournament

The World Group II play-offs were four ties which involved the losing nations of the World Group II and four nations from the three Zonal Group I competitions. Nations that won their play-off ties entered the 2017 World Group II, while losing nations joined their respective zonal groups.

Participating Teams
Argentina	Belgium	Canada	Chinese Taipei
Poland	Serbia	Slovakia	Ukraine

== Serbia vs. Belgium ==
Serbia
2
Hall Aleksandar Nikolić, Belgrade, Serbia
16–17 April 2016
Clay (i)

Belgium
3

			1	2	3
1	(Serbia) (Belgium)	Aleksandra Krunić; Kirsten Flipkens	6; 4	7^{10} 6^{8}
2	(Serbia) (Belgium)	Jovana Jakšić; Yanina Wickmayer	5; 7	0; 6
3	(Serbia) (Belgium)	Aleksandra Krunić; Yanina Wickmayer	6; 1	5; 7	6; 8
4	(Serbia) (Belgium)	Ivana Jorović; Kirsten Flipkens	6^{8} 7^{10}	4; 6
5	(Serbia) (Belgium)	Jovana Jakšić / Nina Stojanović; Ysaline Bonaventure / An-Sophie Mestach	4; 6	6; 0	10; 5

== Slovakia vs. Canada ==
Slovakia
3
Aegon Arena, Bratislava, Slovakia
16–17 April 2016
Clay (i)

Canada
2

			1	2	3
1	(Slovakia) (Canada)	Dominika Cibulková; Françoise Abanda	4; 6	6; 3	6; 1
2	(Slovakia) (Canada)	Anna Karolína Schmiedlová; Aleksandra Wozniak	6; 4	4; 6	6; 4
3	(Slovakia) (Canada)	Jana Čepelová; Françoise Abanda	5; 7	2; 6
4	(Slovakia) (Canada)	Dominika Cibulková; Aleksandra Wozniak	6; 2	6; 0
5	(Slovakia) (Canada)	Jana Čepelová / Tereza Mihalíková; Sharon Fichman / Charlotte Robillard-Millette	3; 6	6; 0	8; 10

== Poland vs. Chinese Taipei ==
Poland
1
OSiR Hala Widowiskowo-Sportowa, Inowrocław, Poland
16–17 April 2016
Hard (i)

Chinese Taipei
4

			1	2	3
1	(Poland) (Chinese Taipei)	Paula Kania; Hsu Ching-wen	3; 6	4; 6
2	(Poland) (Chinese Taipei)	Magdalena Fręch; Lee Ya-hsuan	4; 6	6; 0	6; 2
3	(Poland) (Chinese Taipei)	Paula Kania; Lee Ya-hsuan	6; 2	3; 6	7; 9
4	(Poland) (Chinese Taipei)	Magdalena Fręch; Hsu Ching-wen	2; 6	6; 4	3; 6
5	(Poland) (Chinese Taipei)	Klaudia Jans-Ignacik / Katarzyna Kawa; Chan Chin-wei / Chuang Chia-jung	2; 6	6^{1} 7^{7}

== Ukraine vs. Argentina ==
Ukraine
4
Campa Tennis Club, Kyiv, Ukraine
16–17 April 2016
Hard

Argentina
0

			1	2	3
1	(Ukraine) (Argentina)	Kateryna Bondarenko; María Irigoyen	6; 1	6; 1
2	(Ukraine) (Argentina)	Lesia Tsurenko; Nadia Podoroska	6; 1	6; 4
3	(Ukraine) (Argentina)	Lesia Tsurenko; María Irigoyen	6; 0	6; 3
4	(Ukraine) (Argentina)	Katerina Bondarenko; Nadia Podoroska				not played
5	(Ukraine) (Argentina)	Katerina Bondarenko / Olga Savchuk; María Lourdes Carlé / Guadalupe Pérez Rojas	6; 1	6; 3
