= Romania Billie Jean King Cup team =

Romanian women's tennis team

Romania
- Captain: Alexandra Dulgheru
- Nations Ranking: 12 ▲1 (13 November 2023
- Colors: blue & yellow
- First year: 1973
- Years played: 41
- Ties played (W–L): 129 (75–54)
- Years in World Group: 13 (14–13)
- Best finish: World Group SF (1973, 2019)
- Most total wins: Ruxandra Dragomir (30–17)
- Most singles wins: Ruxandra Dragomir (21–7)
- Most doubles wins: Monica Niculescu (14–9)
- Best doubles team: Gabriela Niculescu / Monica Niculescu (8–0)
- Most ties played: Monica Niculescu (33)
- Most years played: Monica Niculescu (10)

The Romania Billie Jean King Cup team represents Romania in Billie Jean King Cup tennis competition. It is governed by the Federația Română de Tenis and currently competes in the World Group I, the highest level of the competition.

== Current team (2024) ==
- Sorana Cîrstea (singles)
- Ana Bogdan (singles)
- Jaqueline Cristian (singles)
- Monica Niculescu (doubles)
- Elena-Gabriela Ruse (doubles)

== History ==
Romania's best result is a semi-final appearance in 1973. Romania is also a five-time Fed Cup quarterfinalist, having reached the last eight in 1974, 1978, 1980, 1981 and 2016.

It spent a total of twelve years in the competition's World Group, from which it was relegated in 1992. Romania spent the next seven years in the Europe/Africa Zonal level. The team reached the World Group II play-offs in 1999 but failed to secure a promotion to that level.

Romania competed exclusively at the Europe/Africa Zonal level from 2000 through 2013. With four players among the WTA's top 100 at the end of 2013 and 2014, the team achieved back-to-back promotions between 2014 and 2015.

As a result, Romania competed at the World Group level in 2016, for the first time since 1992, and were relegated to the World Group II for 2017. In 2018, Romania booked its return to the World Group thanks to a 3-1 play-off victory over Switzerland.

== Players ==
=== 2019 team (World Group) ===
- Simona Halep (#3 Singles; #386 Doubles)
- Mihaela Buzărnescu (#29 Singles; #27 Doubles)
- Irina-Camelia Begu (#75 Singles; #35 Doubles)
- Ana Bogdan (#105 Singles; #360 Doubles)
- Monica Niculescu (#106 Singles; #51 Doubles)

=== 2018 team (World Group play-offs) ===
- Irina-Camelia Begu (#38 Singles; #25 Doubles)
- Mihaela Buzărnescu (#40 Singles; #65 Doubles)
- Sorana Cîrstea (#34 Singles, #153 Doubles)
- Simona Halep (#1 Singles, #77 Doubles)

=== 2018 team (World Group II) ===
- Irina-Camelia Begu (#37 Singles; #27 Doubles)
- Ana Bogdan (#86 Singles; #564 Doubles)
- Sorana Cîrstea (#38 Singles, #150 Doubles)
- Raluca Olaru (#45 Doubles)

=== 2017 team (World Group II play-offs) ===
- Irina-Camelia Begu (#43 Singles; #111 Doubles)
- Sorana Cîrstea (#37 Singles, #1101 Doubles)
- Simona Halep (#1 Singles; #133 Doubles)
- Monica Niculescu (#77 Singles, #23 Doubles)

=== 2017 team (World Group II) ===
- Irina-Camelia Begu (#29 Singles; #125 Doubles)
- Sorana Cîrstea (#62 Singles, #1113 Doubles)
- Monica Niculescu (#36 Singles, #19 Doubles)
- Patricia Maria Țig (#106 Singles, #205 Doubles)

=== 2016 team (World Group play-offs) ===
- Irina-Camelia Begu (#29 Singles; #168 Doubles)
- Alexandra Dulgheru (#279 Singles; #1062 Doubles)
- Simona Halep (#4 Singles; #124 Doubles)
- Monica Niculescu (#38 Singles; #19 Doubles)

=== 2016 team (World Group) ===
- Simona Halep (#4 Singles; #124 Doubles)
- Monica Niculescu (#38 Singles; #19 Doubles)
- Andreea Mitu (#210 Singles; #80 Doubles)
- Raluca Olaru (#74 Doubles)

=== 2015 team (World Group play-offs) ===
- Irina-Camelia Begu (#33)
- Alexandra Dulgheru (#69)
- Andreea Mitu (#76)
- Raluca Olaru (#62 Doubles)

=== 2015 team (World Group II) ===
- Simona Halep (#3)
- Irina-Camelia Begu (#40)
- Monica Niculescu (#46)
- Alexandra Dulgheru (#82)
- Sorana Cîrstea (#90) ^{INJ}

Notes

- ^{INJ} Player withdrew from the squad due to an injury.

=== 2014 team ===
- Simona Halep
- Sorana Cîrstea
- Irina-Camelia Begu
- Monica Niculescu

=== 2013 team ===
- Sorana Cîrstea
- Andreea Mitu
- Raluca Olaru
- Cristina Dinu

=== 2012 team ===
- Monica Niculescu
- Irina-Camelia Begu
- Simona Halep
- Mihaela Buzărnescu

=== 2011 team ===
- Sorana Cîrstea
- Monica Niculescu
- Alexandra Dulgheru
- Cristina Dinu

=== 2010 team ===
- Alexandra Dulgheru
- Raluca Olaru
- Simona Halep
- Irina-Camelia Begu

=== 2009 team ===
- Sorana Cîrstea
- Monica Niculescu
- Raluca Olaru
- Mihaela Buzărnescu

== Results ==
Only World Group, World Group Play-off, World Group II, and World Group II Play-off ties are included.

=== 1973–1979 ===
Year	Competition	Date	Location	Opponent	Score	Result
1973	World Group, 1st Round	1 May	Bad Homburg (FRG)	Brazil	3–0	Won
1973	World Group, 2nd Round	3 May	Bad Homburg (FRG)	Sweden	2–1	Won
1973	World Group, Quarterfinal	4 May	Bad Homburg (FRG)	Great Britain	2–1	Won
1973	World Group, Semifinal	5 May	Bad Homburg (FRG)	South Africa	1–2	Lost
1974	World Group, 1st Round	May	Naples (ITA)	Argentina	2–1	Won
1974	World Group, 2nd Round	May	Naples (ITA)	Sweden	2–1	Won
1974	World Group, Quarterfinal	May	Naples (ITA)	West Germany	0–3	Lost
1975	World Group, 1st Round	May	Aix-en-Provence (FRA)	Luxembourg	3–0	Won
1975	World Group, 2nd Round	May	Aix-en-Provence (FRA)	Italy	1–2	Lost
1976	World Group, 1st Round	August	Philadelphia (USA)	Australia	0–3	Lost
1978	World Group, 1st Round	November	Melbourne (AUS)	Italy	2–1	Won
1978	World Group, 2nd Round	November	Melbourne (AUS)	Switzerland	2–1	Won
1978	World Group, Quarterfinal	December	Melbourne (AUS)	Soviet Union	0–3	Lost
1979	World Group, 1st Round	April	Madrid (ESP)	Mexico	2–1	Won
1979	World Group, 2nd Round	May	Madrid (ESP)	Switzerland	1–2	Lost

=== 1980–1989 ===
Year	Competition	Date	Location	Opponent	Score	Result
1980	World Group, 1st Round	May	Berlin (FRG)	Ireland	3–0	Won
1980	World Group, 2nd Round	May	Berlin (FRG)	Switzerland	2–1	Won
1980	World Group, Quarterfinal	May	Berlin (FRG)	Czechoslovakia	1–2	Lost
1981	World Group, 1st Round	November	Tokyo (JPN)	Hungary	3–0	Won
1981	World Group, 2nd Round	November	Tokyo (JPN)	Israel	3–0	Won
1981	World Group, Quarterfinal	November	Tokyo (JPN)	United States	0–3	Lost
1983	World Group, 1st Round	July	Zürich (SUI)	Canada	3–0	Won
1983	World Group, 2nd Round	July	Zürich (SUI)	Switzerland	1–2	Lost
1986	World Group, 1st Round	July	Prague (TCH)	Brazil	1–2	Lost

=== 1990–1999 ===
Year	Competition	Date	Location	Opponent	Score	Result
1991	World Group, 1st Round	22 July	Nottingham (GBR)	Finland	0–3	Lost
1991	World Group, Play-off	24 July	Nottingham (GBR)	Portugal	2–0	Won
1992	World Group, 1st Round	14 July	Frankfurt (GER)	Austria	1–2	Lost
1992	World Group, Play-off	16 July	Frankfurt (GER)	Bulgaria	1–2	Lost
1999	World Group II, Round robin	21 July	Amsterdam (NED)	Chinese Taipei	3–0	Won
1999	World Group II, Round robin	22 July	Amsterdam (NED)	Argentina	1–2	Lost
1999	World Group II, Round robin	23 July	Amsterdam (NED)	Australia	1–2	Lost

=== 2010–2019 ===
Year	Competition	Date	Location	Opponent	Score	Result
2014	World Group II, Play-off	19–20 April	Bucharest (ROU)	Serbia	4–1	Won
2015	World Group II, 1st Round	7–8 February	Galați (ROU)	Spain	3–2	Won
2015	World Group, Play-off	18–19 April	Montreal (Canada)	Canada	3–2	Won
2016	World Group, 1st Round	6–7 February	Cluj-Napoca (ROU)	Czech Republic	2–3	Lost
2016	World Group, Play-off	16–17 April	Cluj-Napoca (ROU)	Germany	1–4	Lost
2017	World Group II, 1st Round	11–12 February	Bucharest (ROU)	Belgium	1–3	Lost
2017	World Group II, Play-off	22–23 April	Mamaia (ROU)	Great Britain	3-2	Won
2018	World Group II, 1st Round	10–11 February	Cluj-Napoca (ROU)	Canada	3–1	Won
2018	World Group, Play-off	21–22 April	Cluj-Napoca (ROU)	Switzerland	3–1	Won
2019	World Group, 1st Round	9–10 February	Ostrava (CZE)	Czech Republic	3–2	Won
2019	World Group, Semifinals	20–21 April	Rouen (FRA)	France	2-3	Lost

== See also ==
- Billie Jean King Cup
- Romania Davis Cup team
- Romania at the Hopman Cup
- Romanian Tennis Federation
