= Austria Billie Jean King Cup team =

Austrian women's tennis team

Austria
- Captain: Marion Maruska
- ITF ranking: 25 ▼1 (16 April 2025)
- Colors: red & white
- First year: 1963
- Years played: 54
- Ties played (W–L): 151 (66–85)
- Years in World Group: 31 (20–31)
- Best finish: World Group SF (1987, 1990, 2002)
- Most total wins: Judith Wiesner (39–27)
- Most singles wins: Judith Wiesner (28–16)
- Most doubles wins: Melanie Klaffner (16-12)
- Best doubles team: Melanie Klaffner / Nicole Rottmann (3–0); Petra Ritter / Judith Wiesner (3–1); Melanie Klaffner / Sandra Klemenschits (3–1); Barbara Schett / Patricia Wartusch (3–2); Petra Ritter / Judith Wiesner (3–4)
- Most ties played: Judith Wiesner (40)
- Most years played: Judith Wiesner (14)

The Austria Billie Jean King Cup team represents Austria in the Billie Jean King Cup tennis competition and is governed by the Austrian Tennis Federation, known in German as Österreichischer Tennisverband. They currently compete in the Europe/Africa Group I.

== History ==
Austria competed in its first Federation Cup in 1963. They have reached the semifinals of the competition on three occasions, in 1987, 1990 and 2002.

== Current team (2025) ==
- Julia Grabher
- Tamara Kostic
- Arabella Koller
- Ekaterina Perelygina
- Mavie Osterreicher

== See also ==
- Billie Jean King Cup
- Austria Davis Cup team
- Austria at the Hopman Cup
