= 1993 Federation Cup Europe/Africa Zone =

Subsection of tennis competition

The Europe/Africa Zone was one of three zones of regional Federation Cup qualifying competition in 1993. All ties were played at the City of Nottingham Tennis Centre in Nottingham, England on hard courts.

The twenty-two teams were divided into three pools of four and two pools of five to compete in round-robin matches. After each of the ties had been played, the teams that finished first and second in each of the respective pools would then move on to the play-off stage of the competition. The five teams that won a play-off match would go on to advance to the World Group.

== Pool Stage ==
Date: 10–14 May

	Pool A	CRO	TUR	MLT	EST
1	Croatia (3–0)		3–0	3–0	3–0
2	Turkey (2–1)	0–3		2–1	2–1
3	Malta (1–2)	0–3	1–2		3–0
4	Estonia (0–3)	0–3	1–2	0–3	

	Pool B	BEL	IRL	NOR	SEN
1	Belgium (3–0)		3–0	3–0	3–0
2	Ireland (2–1)	0–3		3–0	3–0
3	Norway (1–2)	0–3	0–3		3–0
4	Senegal (0–3)	0–3	0–3	1–2	

	Pool C	GBR	RUS	LUX	UKR	LIT
1	Great Britain (4–0)		3–0	3–0	3–0	3–0
2	Russia (3–1)	0–3		2–1	3–0	3–0
3	Luxembourg (2–2)	0–3	1–2		2–1	3–0
4	Ukraine (1–3)	0–3	0–3	1–2		3–0
5	Lithuania (0–4)	0–3	0–3	0–3	0–3	

	Pool D	LAT	HUN	ROU	POR
1	Latvia (3–0)		2–1	3–0	2–1
2	Hungary (2–1)	1–2		2–1	2–1
3	Romania (1–2)	0–3	1–2		2–1
4	Portugal (0–3)	1–2	1–2	1–2	

	Pool E	ISR	SLO	GRE	ZIM	TUN
1	Israel (3–1)		2–1	1–2	3–0	3–0
2	Slovenia (3–1)	1–2		2–1	3–0	3–0
3	Greece (2–2)	2–1	1–2		1–2	3–0
4	Zimbabwe (2–2)	0–3	0–3	2–1		2–1
5	Tunisia (0–4)	0–3	0–3	0–3	1–2	

== Play-offs ==
Date: 15 May

Winning team	Score	Losing team
Croatia	2–1	Russia
Belgium	2–1	Slovenia
Great Britain	3–0	Turkey
Latvia	2–1	Hungary
Israel	2–1	Ireland

- Belgium, Croatia, Great Britain, Israel and Latvia advanced to World Group.

== See also ==
- Fed Cup structure
