= 1993 Federation Cup Europe/Africa Zone – play-offs =

Tennis competition play-offs

The play-offs of the 1993 Federation Cup Europe/Africa Zone were the final stages of the Zonal Competition involving teams from Europe and Africa. Those that qualified for this stage placed first and second in their respective pools.

Placing	Pool A	Pool B	Pool C	Pool D	Pool E
1	Croatia	Belgium	Great Britain	Latvia	Israel
2	Turkey	Ireland	Russia	Hungary	Slovenia
3	Malta	Norway	Luxembourg	Romania	Greece
4	Estonia	Senegal	Ukraine	Portugal	Zimbabwe
5			Lithuania		Tunisia

The ten teams were then randomly paired up to compete in five play-off ties, with the winners qualifying for the World Group.

== Croatia vs. Russia ==
Croatia
2
City of Nottingham T.C., England
15 May 1993
Hard (outdoors)

Russia
1

			1	2	3
1	(Croatia) (Russia)	Nadin Ercegović; Eugenia Maniokova	6; 2	6; 3
2	(Croatia) (Russia)	Iva Majoli; Elena Makarova	5; 7	4; 6
3	(Croatia) (Russia)	Iva Majoli / Maja Murić; Elena Makarova / Eugenia Maniokova	6; 3	7; 5

== Belgium vs. Slovenia ==
Belgium
2
City of Nottingham T.C., England
15 May 1993
Hard (outdoors)

Slovenia
1

			1	2	3
1	(Belgium) (Slovenia)	Dominique Monami; Karin Lusnić	6; 1	6; 2
2	(Belgium) (Slovenia)	Sabine Appelmans; Tina Križan	6; 3	6; 2
3	(Belgium) (Slovenia)	Laurence Courtois / Nancy Feber; Tina Križan / Karin Lusnić	3; 6	5; 7

== Great Britain vs. Turkey ==
Great Britain
3
City of Nottingham T.C., England
15 May 1993
Hard (outdoors)

Turkey
0

			1	2	3
1	(United Kingdom) (Turkey)	Monique Javer; Gülberk Gültekin	6; 4	6; 2
2	(United Kingdom) (Turkey)	Clare Wood; Duygu Akşit Oal	6; 2	6; 3
3	(United Kingdom) (Turkey)	Amanda Grunfeld / Julie Salmon; Duygu Akşit Oal / Gülberk Gültekin	6; 2	7; 5

== Latvia vs. Hungary ==
Latvia
2
City of Nottingham T.C., England
15 May 1993
Hard (outdoors)

Hungary
1

			1	2	3
1	(Latvia) (Hungary)	Agnese Blumberga; Ágnes Muzamel	6; 1	6; 3
2	(Latvia) (Hungary)	Larisa Neiland; Virág Csurgó	6; 2	6; 2
3	(Latvia) (Hungary)	Agnese Blumberga / Oksana Bushevitsa; Kata Györke / Ágnes Muzamel	0; 6	0; 6

== Israel vs. Ireland ==
Israel
2
City of Nottingham T.C., England
15 May 1993
Hard (outdoors)

Ireland
1

			1	2	3
1	(Israel) (Republic of Ireland)	Anna Smashnova; Gina Niland	6; 4	6; 3
2	(Israel) (Republic of Ireland)	Yael Segal; Siobhán Nicholson	6; 3	6; 0
3	(Israel) (Republic of Ireland)	Ilana Berger / Yael Segal; Claire Curran / Karen Nugent	4; 6	5; 7

- Croatia, Belgium, Great Britain, Latvia and Israel advanced to the World Group. Croatia, Great Britain and Israel were defeated in the first round by Netherlands, 3–0, Spain, 3–0, and Italy, 3–0, respectively. Belgium was also defeated in the first round, by Latvia, 2–1. Latvia was subsequently defeated in the second round by Netherlands, 3–0.

== See also ==
- Fed Cup structure
