= 1998 Fed Cup Europe/Africa Zone Group II – Pool C =

International tennis competition

Group C of the 1998 Fed Cup Europe/Africa Zone Group II was one of five pools in the Europe/Africa zone of the 1998 Fed Cup. Five teams competed in a round robin competition, with the top team advancing to Group I for 1999.

	(Luxembourg) LUX	(Turkey) TUR	(Norway) NOR	(Armenia) ARM	(Malta) MLT	(Ethiopia) ETH	Match; W–L	Set; W–L	Game; W–L	Standings
Luxembourg		2–1	3–0	2–1	3–0	3–0	5–0	27–6	185–94	1
Turkey	1–2		3–0	2–1	2–1	3–0	4–1	23–12	181–125	2
Norway	0–3	0–3		2–1	3–0	3–0	3–2	18–15	155–129	3
Armenia	1–2	1–2	1–2		2–1	3–0	2–3	18–18	162–158	4
Malta	0–3	1–2	0–3	1–2		2–0	1–4	12–18	134–151	5
Ethiopia	0–3	0–3	0–3	0–3	0–2		0–5	0–28	7–168	6

== Luxembourg vs. Ethiopia ==
Luxembourg
3
Ali Bey Club, Manavgat, Turkey
5 May 1998
Red clay (outdoors)

Ethiopia
0

			1	2	3
1	(Luxembourg) (Ethiopia)	Claudine Schaul; Rediet Kefyalew	6; 0	6; 0
2	(Luxembourg) (Ethiopia)	Anne Kremer; Seble Woldegebriel	6; 0	6; 0
3	(Luxembourg) (Ethiopia)	Anne Kremer / Alexandra Scholer; Rediet Kefyalew / Seble Woldegebriel	6; 0	6; 1

== Turkey vs. Armenia ==
Turkey
2
Ali Bey Club, Manavgat, Turkey
5 May 1998
Red clay (outdoors)

Armenia
1

			1	2	3
1	(Turkey) (Armenia)	Duygu Akşit Oal; Tereza Simonian	6; 4	6; 4
2	(Turkey) (Armenia)	Gülberk Gültekin; Sona Saringulyan	4; 6	6; 1	3; 6
3	(Turkey) (Armenia)	Duygu Akşit Oal / Gülberk Gültekin; Naira Santrosian / Sona Saringulyan	6; 0	4; 6	7; 5

== Norway vs. Malta ==
Norway
3
Ali Bey Club, Manavgat, Turkey
5 May 1998
Red clay (outdoors)

Malta
0

			1	2	3
1	(Norway) (Malta)	Caroline Tinemand; Lisa Camenzuli	6; 4	7; 5
2	(Norway) (Malta)	Karoline Borgersen; Carol Cassar-Torreggiani	6; 0	6; 2
3	(Norway) (Malta)	Karoline Borgersen / Tina Samara; Lisa Camenzuli / Carol Cassar-Torreggiani	6^{4} 7^{7}	6; 2	6; 2

== Luxembourg vs. Malta ==
Luxembourg
3
Ali Bey Club, Manavgat, Turkey
6 May 1998
Red clay (outdoors)

Malta
0

			1	2	3
1	(Luxembourg) (Malta)	Claudine Schaul; Helen Asciak	6; 4	6; 1
2	(Luxembourg) (Malta)	Anne Kremer; Lisa Camenzuli	6; 2	6; 0
3	(Luxembourg) (Malta)	Céline Francois / Anne Kremer; Lisa Camenzuli / Carol Cassar-Torreggiani	3; 6	7^{7} 6^{4}	6; 3

== Turkey vs. Norway ==
Turkey
3
Ali Bey Club, Manavgat, Turkey
6 May 1998
Red clay (outdoors)

Armenia
0

			1	2	3
1	(Turkey) (Armenia)	Duygu Akşit Oal; Caroline Tinemand	3; 6	6; 1	6; 4
2	(Turkey) (Armenia)	Gülberk Gültekin; Tina Samara	7^{7} 6^{4}	6; 1
3	(Turkey) (Armenia)	Duygu Akşit Oal / Gülberk Gültekin; Karoline Borgersen / Tina Samara	5; 7	7^{7} 6^{3}	6; 3

== Armenia vs. Ethiopia ==
Armenia
3
Ali Bey Club, Manavgat, Turkey
6 May 1998
Red clay (outdoors)

Ethiopia
0

			1	2	3
1	(Armenia) (Ethiopia)	Tereza Simonian; Rediet Kefyalew	6; 0	6; 1
2	(Armenia) (Ethiopia)	Sona Saringulyan; Seble Woldegebriel	6; 0	6; 1
3	(Armenia) (Ethiopia)	Tereza Simonian / Lilit Teloumian; Rediet Kefyalew / Seble Woldegebriel	6; 2	6; 1

== Luxembourg vs. Armenia ==
Luxembourg
2
Ali Bey Club, Manavgat, Turkey
7 May 1998
Red clay (outdoors)

Armenia
1

			1	2	3
1	(Luxembourg) (Armenia)	Claudine Schaul; Tereza Simonian	6; 4	6; 0
2	(Luxembourg) (Armenia)	Anne Kremer; Sona Saringulyan	3; 6	6; 2	6; 3
3	(Luxembourg) (Armenia)	Céline Francois / Claudine Schaul; Naira Santrosian / Sona Saringulyan	6^{5} 7^{7}	7; 5	5; 7

== Turkey vs. Malta ==
Turkey
2
Ali Bey Club, Manavgat, Turkey
7 May 1998
Red clay (outdoors)

Malta
1

			1	2	3
1	(Turkey) (Malta)	Duygu Akşit Oal; Lisa Camenzuli	6; 3	7; 5
2	(Turkey) (Malta)	Gülberk Gültekin; Carol Cassar-Torreggiani	7^{7} 6^{4}	7; 5
3	(Turkey) (Malta)	Serra Olgaç; Helen Asciak	2; 6	3; 6

== Norway vs. Ethiopia ==
Norway
3
Ali Bey Club, Manavgat, Turkey
7 May 1998
Red clay (outdoors)

Ethiopia
0

			1	2	3
1	(Norway) (Ethiopia)	Karoline Borgersen; Rediet Kefyalew	6; 0	6; 0
2	(Norway) (Ethiopia)	Tina Samara; Seble Woldegebriel	6; 0	6; 1
3	(Norway) (Ethiopia)	Karoline Borgersen / Tina Samara; Rediet Kefyalew / Seble Woldegebriel	6; 0	6; 0

== Luxembourg vs. Norway ==
Luxembourg
3
Ali Bey Club, Manavgat, Turkey
8 May 1998
Red clay (outdoors)

Norway
0

			1	2	3
1	(Luxembourg) (Norway)	Claudine Schaul; Caroline Tinemand	6; 4	6; 3
2	(Luxembourg) (Norway)	Anne Kremer; Karoline Borgersen	6; 3	6; 0
3	(Luxembourg) (Norway)	Céline Francois / Anne Kremer; Karoline Borgersen / Tina Samara	6; 1	6; 1

== Turkey vs. Ethiopia ==
Turkey
3
Ali Bey Club, Manavgat, Turkey
8 May 1998
Red clay (outdoors)

Ethiopia
0

			1	2	3
1	(Turkey) (Ethiopia)	Serra Olgaç; Rediet Kefyalew	6; 0	6; 0
2	(Turkey) (Ethiopia)	Seden Özlü; Seble Woldegebriel	6; 0	6; 0
3	(Turkey) (Ethiopia)	Serra Olgaç / Seden Özlü; Rediet Kefyalew / Seble Woldegebriel	6; 0	6; 0

== Armenia vs. Malta ==
Armenia
2
Ali Bey Club, Manavgat, Turkey
8 May 1998
Red clay (outdoors)

Malta
1

			1	2	3
1	(Armenia) (Malta)	Tereza Simonian; Helen Asciak	6; 2	2; 6	6; 3
2	(Armenia) (Malta)	Sona Saringulyan; Lisa Camenzuli	6; 3	5; 7	6; 2
3	(Armenia) (Malta)	Naira Santrosian / Lilit Teloumian; Helen Asciak / Lisa Camenzuli	3; 6	2; 6

== Luxembourg vs. Turkey ==
Luxembourg
2
Ali Bey Club, Manavgat, Turkey
9 May 1998
Red clay (outdoors)

Turkey
1

			1	2	3
1	(Luxembourg) (Turkey)	Claudine Schaul; Duygu Akşit Oal	6; 2	7; 5
2	(Luxembourg) (Turkey)	Anne Kremer; Gülberk Gültekin	6; 3	6; 3
3	(Luxembourg) (Turkey)	Céline Francois / Alexandra Scholer; Duygu Akşit Oal / Gülberk Gültekin	2; 6	1; 6

== Norway vs. Armenia ==
Norway
2
Ali Bey Club, Manavgat, Turkey
9 May 1998
Red clay (outdoors)

Armenia
1

			1	2	3
1	(Norway) (Armenia)	Karoline Borgersen; Tereza Simonian	6; 4	6; 1
2	(Norway) (Armenia)	Tina Samara; Sona Saringulyan	3; 6	2; 6
3	(Norway) (Armenia)	Karoline Borgersen / Tina Samara; Sona Saringulyan / Naira Santrosian	7; 5	6; 2

== Malta vs. Ethiopia ==
Malta
2
Ali Bey Club, Manavgat, Turkey
9 May 1998
Red clay (outdoors)

Ethiopia
0

			1	2	3
1	(Malta) (Ethiopia)	Helen Asciak; Temesgen Metasebeya	6; 0	6; 0
2	(Malta) (Ethiopia)	Lisa Camenzuli; Seble Woldegebriel	6; 0	6; 0
3	(Malta) (Ethiopia)	Helen Asciak / Lisa Camenzuli; Temesgen Metasebeya / Seble Woldegebriel				not played

- Luxembourg placed first in this group and thus advanced to Group I for 1999, where they placed second in their pool of four.

== See also ==
- Fed Cup structure
