= 1993 Federation Cup Europe/Africa Zone – Pool A =

Group A of the 1993 Federation Cup Europe/Africa Zone was one of five pools in the Europe/Africa zone of the 1993 Federation Cup. Four teams competed in a round robin competition, with the top two teams advancing to the play-offs.

	(Croatia) CRO	(Turkey) TUR	(Malta) MLT	(Estonia) EST	RR; W–L	Set; W–L	Game; W–L	Standings
Croatia		3–0	3–0	3–0	3–0	18–0	109–29	1
Turkey	0–3		2–1	2–1	2–1	9–11	83–94	2
Malta	0–3	1–2		3–0	1–2	9–13	88–112	3
Estonia	0–3	1–2	0–3		0–3	4–16	68–113	4

== Croatia vs. Estonia ==
Croatia
3
City of Nottingham T.C., England
11 May 1993
Hard (outdoors)

Estonia
0

			1	2	3
1	(Croatia) (Estonia)	Nadin Ercegović; Ande Tulp	6; 0	6; 0
2	(Croatia) (Estonia)	Iva Majoli; Helene Holter	6; 3	6; 2
3	(Croatia) (Estonia)	Iva Majoli / Maja Murić; Helene Holter / Ande Tulp	6; 2	7; 5

== Turkey vs. Malta ==
Turkey
2
City of Nottingham T.C., England
11 May 1993
Hard (outdoors)

Malta
1

			1	2	3
1	(Turkey) (Malta)	Gülberk Gültekin; Helen Asciak	6^{3} 7^{7}	6; 1	6; 1
2	(Turkey) (Malta)	Duygu Akşit Oal; Carol Cassar-Torreggiani	7^{7} 6^{5}	5; 7	1; 6
3	(Turkey) (Malta)	Duygu Akşit Oal / Gülberk Gültekin; Helen Asciak / Carol Cassar-Torreggiani	6; 3	6; 4

== Croatia vs. Turkey ==
Croatia
3
City of Nottingham T.C., England
12 May 1993
Hard (outdoors)

Turkey
0

			1	2	3
1	(Croatia) (Turkey)	Nadin Ercegović; Gülberk Gültekin	6; 4	6; 3
2	(Croatia) (Turkey)	Iva Majoli; Duygu Akşit Oal	6; 2	6; 1
3	(Croatia) (Turkey)	Iva Majoli / Maja Murić; Esra Bayburt / Gülberk Gültekin	6; 1	6; 0

== Malta vs. Estonia ==
Malta
3
City of Nottingham T.C., England
12 May 1993
Hard (outdoors)

Estonia
0

			1	2	3
1	(Malta) (Estonia)	Helen Asciak; Helene Holter	6^{0} 7^{7}	6; 4	6; 2
2	(Malta) (Estonia)	Carol Cassar-Torreggiani; Kaja Kond	6; 3	6; 4
3	(Malta) (Estonia)	Helen Asciak / Carol Cassar-Torreggiani; Kaja Kond / Ande Tulp	4; 6	7; 5	6; 2

== Croatia vs. Malta ==
Croatia
3
City of Nottingham T.C., England
13 May 1993
Hard (outdoors)

Malta
0

			1	2	3
1	(Croatia) (Malta)	Silvija Talaja; Helen Asciak	6; 2	6; 1
2	(Croatia) (Malta)	Nadin Ercegović; Carol Cassar-Torreggiani	6; 0	6; 2
3	(Croatia) (Malta)	Nadin Ercegović / Maja Murić; Helen Asciak / Carol Cassar-Torreggiani	6; 1	6; 0

== Turkey vs. Estonia ==
Turkey
2
City of Nottingham T.C., England
13 May 1993
Hard (outdoors)

Estonia
1

			1	2	3
1	(Turkey) (Estonia)	Gülberk Gültekin; Ande Tulp	6; 1	7; 5
2	(Turkey) (Estonia)	Duygu Akşit Oal; Helene Holter	2; 6	2; 6
3	(Turkey) (Estonia)	Duygu Akşit Oal / Gülberk Gültekin; Helene Holter / Kaja Kond	6; 1	6; 4

== See also ==
- Fed Cup structure
