= 1993 Federation Cup Europe/Africa Zone – Pool C =

Group C of the 1993 Federation Cup Europe/Africa Zone was one of five pools in the Europe/Africa zone of the 1993 Federation Cup. Four teams competed in a round robin competition, with the top two teams advancing to the play-offs.

	(United Kingdom) GBR	(Russia) RUS	(Luxembourg) LUX	(Ukraine) UKR	(Lithuania) LIT	Match; W–L	Set; W–L	Game; W–L	Standings
Great Britain		3–0	3–0	3–0	3–0	4–0	24–1	148–62	1
Russia	0–3		2–1	3–0	3–0	3–1	17–8	128–81	2
Luxembourg	0–3	1–2		2–1	3–0	2–2	12–13	100–104	3
Ukraine	0–3	0–3	1–2		3–0	1–3	9–17	86–114	4
Lithuania	0–3	0–3	0–3	0–3		0–4	1–24	44–144	5

== Great Britain vs. Luxembourg ==
Great Britain
3
City of Nottingham T.C., England
10 May 1993
Hard (outdoors)

Luxembourg
0

			1	2	3
1	(United Kingdom) (Luxembourg)	Monique Javer; Anne Kremer	6; 4	6; 4
2	(United Kingdom) (Luxembourg)	Clare Wood; Marie-Christine Goy	6; 2	6; 1
3	(United Kingdom) (Luxembourg)	Julie Salmon / Clare Wood; Marie-Christine Goy / Anne Kremer	6; 1	6; 3

== Russia vs. Ukraine ==
Russia
3
City of Nottingham T.C., England
10 May 1993
Hard (outdoors)

Ukraine
0

			1	2	3
1	(Russia) (Ukraine)	Eugenia Maniokova; Natalia Biletskaya	6; 2	6; 0
2	(Russia) (Ukraine)	Elena Makarova; Olga Lugina	6; 3	6; 3
3	(Russia) (Ukraine)	Elena Makarova / Svetlana Cherneva; Natalia Biletskaya / Olga Lugina	6; 3	6; 4

== Great Britain vs. Lithuania ==
Great Britain
3
City of Nottingham T.C., England
11 May 1993
Hard (outdoors)

Lithuania
0

			1	2	3
1	(United Kingdom) (Lithuania)	Monique Javer; Edita Liachovičiūtė	6; 4	6; 1
2	(United Kingdom) (Lithuania)	Clare Wood; Galina Misiuriova	6; 1	6; 2
3	(United Kingdom) (Lithuania)	Julie Salmon / Clare Wood; Edita Liachovičiūtė / Galina Misiuriova	6; 4	6; 1

== Luxembourg vs. Ukraine ==
Luxembourg
2
City of Nottingham T.C., England
11 May 1993
Hard (outdoors)

Ukraine
1

			1	2	3
1	(Luxembourg) (Ukraine)	Anne Kremer; Natalia Biletskaya	6; 1	6; 0
2	(Luxembourg) (Ukraine)	Marie-Christine Goy; Olga Lugina	0; 6	1; 6
3	(Luxembourg) (Ukraine)	Marie-Christine Goy / Anne Kremer; Natalia Biletskaya / Olga Lugina	7^{7} 6^{4}	4; 6	6; 1

== Great Britain vs. Russia ==
Great Britain
3
City of Nottingham T.C., England
12 May 1993
Hard (outdoors)

Russia
0

			1	2	3
1	(United Kingdom) (Russia)	Monique Javer; Eugenia Maniokova	4; 6	6; 2	6; 4
2	(United Kingdom) (Russia)	Clare Wood; Elena Makarova	6; 3	6; 4
3	(United Kingdom) (Russia)	Julie Salmon / Clare Wood; Eugenia Maniokova / Svetlana Cherneva	6; 4	6; 2

== Luxembourg vs. Lithuania ==
Luxembourg
3
City of Nottingham T.C., England
12 May 1993
Hard (outdoors)

Lithuania
0

			1	2	3
1	(Luxembourg) (Lithuania)	Anne Kremer; Edita Liachovičiūtė	6; 1	6; 0
2	(Luxembourg) (Lithuania)	Marie-Christine Goy; Galina Misiuriova	6; 1	6; 2
3	(Luxembourg) (Lithuania)	Anne Kremer / Michele Wagner; Vita Kaminskiatė / Galina Misiuriova	6; 4	6; 3

== Great Britain vs. Ukraine ==
Great Britain
3
City of Nottingham T.C., England
13 May 1993
Hard (outdoors)

Ukraine
0

			1	2	3
1	(United Kingdom) (Ukraine)	Monique Javer; Gabriela Beleni	6; 3	6; 3
2	(United Kingdom) (Ukraine)	Clare Wood; Olga Lugina	6; 0	6; 2
3	(United Kingdom) (Ukraine)	Amanda Grunfeld / Julie Salmon; Gabriela Beleni / Natalia Biletskaya	6; 1	6; 0

== Russia vs. Lithuania ==
Russia
3
City of Nottingham T.C., England
13 May 1993
Hard (outdoors)

Lithuania
0

			1	2	3
1	(Russia) (Lithuania)	Eugenia Maniokova; Vita Kaminskiatė	6; 0	6; 1
2	(Russia) (Lithuania)	Elena Makarova; Galina Misiuriova	6; 3	6; 2
3	(Russia) (Lithuania)	Elena Makarova / Svetlana Cherneva; Vita Kaminskiatė / Galina Misiuriova	6; 1	6; 0

== Russia vs. Luxembourg ==
Russia
2
City of Nottingham T.C., England
14 May 1993
Hard (outdoors)

Luxembourg
1

			1	2	3
1	(Russia) (Luxembourg)	Eugenia Maniokova; Anne Kremer	3; 6	3; 6
2	(Russia) (Luxembourg)	Elena Makarova; Marie-Christine Goy	6; 1	6; 0
3	(Russia) (Luxembourg)	Elena Makarova / Eugenia Maniokova; Marie-Christine Goy / Anne Kremer	6; 1	7; 5

== Ukraine vs. Lithuania ==
Ukraine
3
City of Nottingham T.C., England
14 May 1993
Hard (outdoors)

Lithuania
0

			1	2	3
1	(Ukraine) (Lithuania)	Gabriela Beleni; Vita Kaminskiatė	0; 6	6; 0	6; 0
2	(Ukraine) (Lithuania)	Natalia Biletskaya; Galina Misiuriova	6; 3	6; 0
3	(Ukraine) (Lithuania)	Gabriela Beleni / Natalia Biletskaya; Vita Kaminskiatė / Galina Misiuriova	6; 2	6; 2

== See also ==
- Fed Cup structure
