= 2026 Billie Jean King Cup qualifying round =

International women's tennis competition

The 2026 Billie Jean King Cup qualifying round was held from 10 to 11 April 2026. The seven winners of this round qualified for the 2026 Billie Jean King Cup finals while the seven losers would play at the 2026 Billie Jean King Cup play-offs.

== Teams ==
Fourteen teams played for seven spots in the finals, in series decided on a home and away basis. This year Billie Jean King Cup qualifying returned to home and away basis, with doubles rubber moved to the third game, coinciding with Davis Cup.

These fourteen teams were:

- 7 teams of the 2025 Finals, except the host, China.
- 7 winning teams from the 2025 play-offs.

The seven winning teams from the qualifying round would play at the finals, and the seven losing teams would play at the 2026 play-offs.

#: Nation's ranking as of 17 November 2025.

Seeded teams

- Italy (#1)
- United States (#2)
- Great Britain (#3)
- Canada (#4)
- Spain (#5)
- Czech Republic (#6)
- Poland (#7)

Unseeded teams

- Ukraine (#8)
- Kazakhstan (#9)
- Japan (#10)
- Australia (#12)
- Switzerland (#13)
- Belgium (#17)
- Slovenia (#18)

== Results summary ==
Home team	Score	Away team	Location	Venue	Surface
Italy [1]	3–1	Japan	Velletri	ASD Colle degli Dei	Clay
Belgium	3–1	United States [2]	Ostend	COREtec Dôme	Clay (i)
Australia	1–3	Great Britain [3]	Melbourne	John Cain Arena	Hard
Kazakhstan	3–1	Canada [4]	Astana	Beeline Arena	Clay (i)
Slovenia	1–3	Spain [5]	Portorož	Tennis Center Portorož	Clay
Switzerland	2–3	Czech Republic [6]	Biel/Bienne	Swiss Tennis Arena	Hard (i)
Poland [7]	0–4	Ukraine	Gliwice	PreZero Arena	Clay (i)

== Results ==
=== Italy vs. Japan ===
Italy
3
ASD Colle degli Dei, Velletri, Italy
10–11 April 2026
Clay

Japan
1

			1	2	3
1	(Italy) (Japan)	Elisabetta Cocciaretto; Moyuka Uchijima	7; 5	6; 2
2	(Italy) (Japan)	Jasmine Paolini; Himeno Sakatsume	6; 3	6; 1
3	(Italy) (Japan)	Sara Errani / Jasmine Paolini; Shuko Aoyama / Nao Hibino	6; 2	7; 5
4	(Italy) (Japan)	Lucia Bronzetti; Himeno Sakatsume	6^{4} 7^{7}	2; 6
5	(Italy) (Japan)	Elisabetta Cocciaretto; Himeno Sakatsume				not played

=== Belgium vs. United States ===
Belgium
3
COREtec Dôme, Ostend, Belgium
10–11 April 2026
Clay (i)

United States
1

			1	2	3
1	(Belgium) (United States)	Hanne Vandewinkel; Iva Jovic	7^{7} 6^{3}	6; 3
2	(Belgium) (United States)	Elise Mertens; McCartney Kessler	7^{7} 6^{3}	2; 6	3; 3	retired
3	(Belgium) (United States)	Magali Kempen / Elise Mertens; Caty McNally / Nicole Melichar-Martinez	4; 6	2; 6
4	(Belgium) (United States)	Greet Minnen; Iva Jovic	7; 5	6; 3
5	(Belgium) (United States)	Hanne Vandewinkel; McCartney Kessler				not played

=== Australia vs. Great Britain ===
Australia
1
John Cain Arena, Melbourne, Australia
10–11 April 2026
Hard

Great Britain
3

			1	2	3
1	(Australia) (United Kingdom)	Talia Gibson; Mika Stojsavljevic	6^{4} 7^{7}	5; 7
2	(Australia) (United Kingdom)	Kimberly Birrell; Harriet Dart	6; 4	3; 6	3; 6
3	(Australia) (United Kingdom)	Storm Hunter / Ellen Perez; Jodie Burrage / Harriet Dart	3; 6	4; 6
4	(Australia) (United Kingdom)	Emerson Jones; Katie Swan	7; 5	6; 3
5	(Australia) (United Kingdom)	Kimberly Birrell; Mika Stojsavljevic				not played

=== Kazakhstan vs. Canada ===
Kazakhstan
3
Beeline Arena, Astana, Kazakhstan
10–11 April 2026
Clay (i)

Canada
1

			1	2	3
1	(Kazakhstan) (Canada)	Yulia Putintseva; Kayla Cross	6; 3	7; 5
2	(Kazakhstan) (Canada)	Sonja Zhiyenbayeva; Bianca Andreescu	4; 6	6^{4} 7^{7}
3	(Kazakhstan) (Canada)	Anna Danilina / Zhibek Kulambayeva; Bianca Andreescu / Kayla Cross	7; 5	6; 1
4	(Kazakhstan) (Canada)	Yulia Putintseva; Bianca Andreescu	7^{7} 6^{5}	3; 6	7^{7} 6^{4}
5	(Kazakhstan) (Canada)	Sonja Zhiyenbayeva; Kayla Cross				not played

=== Slovenia vs. Spain ===
Slovenia
1
Tennis Center Portorož, Portorož, Slovenia
10–11 April 2026
Clay

Spain
3

			1	2	3
1	(Slovenia) (Spain)	Tamara Zidanšek; Kaitlin Quevedo	6; 4	2; 6	0; 0	retired
2	(Slovenia) (Spain)	Veronika Erjavec; Leyre Romero Gormaz	6; 4	6; 3
3	(Slovenia) (Spain)	Veronika Erjavec / Nika Radišić; Aliona Bolsova / Sara Sorribes Tormo	4; 6	3; 6
4	(Slovenia) (Spain)	Veronika Erjavec; Kaitlin Quevedo	6^{4} 7^{7}	2; 6
5	(Slovenia) (Spain)	Tamara Zidanšek; Leyre Romero Gormaz				not played

=== Switzerland vs. Czechia ===
Switzerland
2
Swiss Tennis Arena, Biel, Switzerland
10–11 April 2026
Hard (i)

Czech Republic
3

			1	2	3
1	(Switzerland) (Czech Republic)	Belinda Bencic; Marie Bouzková	6; 3	6^{4} 7^{7}	6; 4
2	(Switzerland) (Czech Republic)	Viktorija Golubic; Linda Nosková	1; 6	4; 6
3	(Switzerland) (Czech Republic)	Belinda Bencic / Viktorija Golubic; Tereza Valentová / Markéta Vondroušová	6^{4} 7^{7}	7^{7} 6^{0}	6; 1
4	(Switzerland) (Czech Republic)	Belinda Bencic; Linda Nosková	3; 6	6; 3	6^{9} 7^{11}
5	(Switzerland) (Czech Republic)	Viktorija Golubic; Marie Bouzková	6^{4} 7^{7}	2; 6

=== Poland vs. Ukraine ===
Poland
0
PreZero Arena, Gliwice, Poland
10–11 April 2026
Clay (i)

Ukraine
4

			1	2	3
1	(Poland) (Ukraine)	Magda Linette; Marta Kostyuk	4; 6	0; 6
2	(Poland) (Ukraine)	Katarzyna Kawa; Elina Svitolina	2; 6	1; 6
3	(Poland) (Ukraine)	Maja Chwalińska / Martyna Kubka; Lyudmyla Kichenok / Nadiia Kichenok	5; 7	7^{7} 6^{4}	3; 6
4	(Poland) (Ukraine)	Linda Klimovičová; Oleksandra Oliynykova	4; 6	1; 6
5	(Poland) (Ukraine)	Katarzyna Kawa; Marta Kostyuk				not played
