= 1993 Federation Cup Europe/Africa Zone – Pool B =

International tennis competition

Group B of the 1993 Federation Cup Europe/Africa Zone was one of five pools in the Europe/Africa zone of the 1993 Federation Cup. Four teams competed in a round robin competition, with the top two teams advancing to the play-offs.

	(Belgium) BEL	(Republic of Ireland) IRL	(Norway) NOR	(Senegal) SEN	RR; W–L	Set; W–L	Game; W–L	Standings
Belgium		3–0	3–0	3–0	3–0	18–0	110–28	1
Ireland	0–3		3–0	3–0	2–1	12–7	89–73	2
Norway	0–3	0–3		3–0	1–2	7–14	82–99	3
Senegal	0–3	0–3	0–3		0–3	2–18	35–116	4

== Belgium vs. Ireland ==
Belgium
3
City of Nottingham T.C., England
11 May 1993
Hard (outdoors)

Ireland
0

			1	2	3
1	(Belgium) (Republic of Ireland)	Dominique Monami; Gina Niland	7; 5	6; 1
2	(Belgium) (Republic of Ireland)	Sabine Appelmans; Siobhán Nicholson	6; 4	6; 1
3	(Belgium) (Republic of Ireland)	Laurence Courtois / Nancy Feber; Siobhán Nicholson / Karen Nugent	6; 2	6; 0

== Norway vs. Senegal ==
Norway
3
City of Nottingham T.C., England
11 May 1993
Hard (outdoors)

Senegal
0

			1	2	3
1	(Norway) (Senegal)	Amy Jonsson-Råholt; Amy Berthe	6; 1	6; 1
2	(Norway) (Senegal)	Cathrine Instebø; Myriam Berthe	6; 0	5; 7	6; 4
3	(Norway) (Senegal)	Linda Beate Andersen / Amy Jonsson-Råholt; Amy Berthe / Myriam Berthe	6; 0	3; 6	6; 3

== Belgium vs. Norway ==
Belgium
3
City of Nottingham T.C., England
12 May 1993
Hard (outdoors)

Norway
0

			1	2	3
1	(Belgium) (Norway)	Nancy Feber; Amy Jonsson-Råholt	6; 2	7; 5
2	(Belgium) (Norway)	Dominique Monami; Cathrine Instebø	6; 3	6; 1
3	(Belgium) (Norway)	Sabine Appelmans / Laurence Courtois; Linda Beate Andersen / Cathrine Instebø	6; 0	6; 1

== Ireland vs. Senegal ==
Ireland
3
City of Nottingham T.C., England
12 May 1993
Hard (outdoors)

Senegal
0

			1	2	3
1	(Republic of Ireland) (Senegal)	Karen Nugent; Khady N'dèye Diop	6; 4	6; 1
2	(Republic of Ireland) (Senegal)	Gina Niland; Amy Berthe	6; 0	6; 1
3	(Republic of Ireland) (Senegal)	Siobhán Nicholson / Gina Niland; Amy Berthe / Khady N'dèye Diop	6; 4	6; 0

== Belgium vs. Senegal ==
Belgium
3
City of Nottingham T.C., England
13 May 1993
Hard (outdoors)

Senegal
0

			1	2	3
1	(Belgium) (Senegal)	Laurence Courtois; Amy Berthe	6; 0	6; 1
2	(Belgium) (Senegal)	Nancy Feber; Myriam Berthe	6; 0	6; 0
3	(Belgium) (Senegal)	Laurence Courtois / Dominique Monami; Amy Berthe / Myriam Berthe	6; 1	6; 1

== Ireland vs. Norway ==
Ireland
3
City of Nottingham T.C., England
13 May 1993
Hard (outdoors)

Norway
0

			1	2	3
1	(Republic of Ireland) (Norway)	Gina Niland; Amy Jonsson-Råholt	4; 6	6; 2	6; 3
2	(Republic of Ireland) (Norway)	Siobhán Nicholson; Cathrine Instebø	6; 4	6; 3
3	(Republic of Ireland) (Norway)	Claire Curran / Karen Nugent; Linda Beate Andersen / Cathrine Instebø	6; 4	6; 4

== See also ==
- Fed Cup structure
