= 1993 Federation Cup Europe/Africa Zone – Pool E =

Group E of the 1993 Federation Cup Europe/Africa Zone was one of five pools in the Europe/Africa zone of the 1993 Federation Cup. Four teams competed in a round robin competition, with the top two teams advancing to the play-offs.

	(Israel) ISR	(Slovenia) SLO	(Greece) GRE	(Zimbabwe) ZIM	(Tunisia) TUN	Match; W–L	Set; W–L	Game; W–L	Standings
Israel		2–1	1–2	3–0	3–0	3–1	19–6	138–72	1
Slovenia	1–2		2–1	3–0	3–0	3–1	19–8	135–88	2
Greece	2–1	1–2		1–2	3–0	2–2	16–12	128–110	3
Zimbabwe	0–3	0–3	2–1		2–1	2–2	9–17	92–122	4
Tunisia	0–3	0–3	0–3	1–2		0–4	3–23	49–150	5

== Israel vs. Tunisia ==
Israel
3
City of Nottingham T.C., England
10 May 1993
Hard (outdoors)

Tunisia
0

			1	2	3
1	(Israel) (Tunisia)	Anna Smashnova; Aicha Ferjani	6; 0	6; 0
2	(Israel) (Tunisia)	Yael Segal; Selima Sfar	6; 1	6; 0
3	(Israel) (Tunisia)	Ilana Berger / Yael Segal; Issem Essaies / Selima Sfar	6; 2	6; 2

== Slovenia vs. Zimbabwe ==
Slovenia
3
City of Nottingham T.C., England
10 May 1993
Hard (outdoors)

Zimbabwe
0

			1	2	3
1	(Slovenia) (Zimbabwe)	Tina Križan; Cara Black	6; 0	6; 4
2	(Slovenia) (Zimbabwe)	Barbara Mulej; Paula Iversen	6; 2	6; 1
3	(Slovenia) (Zimbabwe)	Tina Križan / Karin Lusnić; Paula Iversen / Nicole Wagstaff	6; 2	6; 3

== Slovenia vs. Greece ==
Slovenia
2
City of Nottingham T.C., England
11 May 1993
Hard (outdoors)

Greece
1

			1	2	3
1	(Slovenia) (Greece)	Tina Križan; Christina Zachariadou	6; 1	6; 0
2	(Slovenia) (Greece)	Barbara Mulej; Christína Papadáki	2; 6	6; 2	6; 2
3	(Slovenia) (Greece)	Tina Križan / Karin Lusnić; Christína Papadáki / Christina Zachariadou	3; 6	6; 3	2; 6

== Zimbabwe vs. Tunisia ==
Zimbabwe
2
City of Nottingham T.C., England
11 May 1993
Hard (outdoors)

Tunisia
1

			1	2	3
1	(Zimbabwe) (Tunisia)	Cara Black; Aicha Ferjani	6; 0	6; 0
2	(Zimbabwe) (Tunisia)	Paula Iversen; Selima Sfar	6; 1	6; 2
3	(Zimbabwe) (Tunisia)	Paula Iversen / Nicole Wagstaff; Issem Essaies / Selima Sfar	6^{4} 7^{7}	6; 2	2; 6

== Israel vs. Slovenia ==
Israel
2
City of Nottingham T.C., England
12 May 1993
Hard (outdoors)

Slovenia
1

			1	2	3
1	(Israel) (Slovenia)	Anna Smashnova; Tina Križan	6; 3	6; 3
2	(Israel) (Slovenia)	Yael Segal; Barbara Mulej	6; 2	6; 0
3	(Israel) (Slovenia)	Ilana Berger / Yael Segal; Tina Križan / Karin Lusnić	5; 7	5; 7

== Greece vs. Zimbabwe ==
Greece
1
City of Nottingham T.C., England
14 May 1993
Hard (outdoors)

Zimbabwe
2

			1	2	3
1	(Greece) (Zimbabwe)	Christina Zachariadou; Cara Black	4; 6	6; 3	4; 6
2	(Greece) (Zimbabwe)	Christína Papadáki; Paula Iversen	6; 2	6; 2
3	(Greece) (Zimbabwe)	Christína Papadáki / Christina Zachariadou; Cara Black / Paula Iversen	2; 6	4; 6

== Israel vs. Greece ==
Israel
1
City of Nottingham T.C., England
13 May 1993
Hard (outdoors)

Greece
2

			1	2	3
1	(Israel) (Greece)	Anna Smashnova; Christina Zachariadou	6; 3	6; 3
2	(Israel) (Greece)	Yael Segal; Christína Papadáki	4; 6	4; 6
3	(Israel) (Greece)	Ilana Berger / Yael Segal; Christína Papadáki / Christina Zachariadou	3; 6	6; 4	3; 6

== Slovenia vs. Tunisia ==
Slovenia
3
City of Nottingham T.C., England
13 May 1993
Hard (outdoors)

Tunisia
0

			1	2	3
1	(Slovenia) (Tunisia)	Tina Vukasovič; Aicha Ferjani	6; 1	6; 1
2	(Slovenia) (Tunisia)	Karin Lusnić; Selima Sfar	3; 6	7; 5	6; 0
3	(Slovenia) (Tunisia)	Tina Križan / Karin Lusnić; Issem Essaies / Selima Sfar	6; 0	6; 3

== Israel vs. Zimbabwe ==
Israel
3
City of Nottingham T.C., England
14 May 1993
Hard (outdoors)

Zimbabwe
0

			1	2	3
1	(Israel) (Zimbabwe)	Anna Smashnova; Cara Black	6; 0	6; 4
2	(Israel) (Zimbabwe)	Yael Segal; Paula Iversen	6; 1	6; 2
3	(Israel) (Zimbabwe)	Ilana Berger / Yael Segal; Cara Black / Paula Iversen	6; 3	6; 1

== Greece vs. Tunisia ==
Greece
3
City of Nottingham T.C., England
14 May 1993
Hard (outdoors)

Tunisia
0

			1	2	3
1	(Greece) (Tunisia)	Christina Zachariadou; Issem Essaies	6; 0	6; 1
2	(Greece) (Tunisia)	Christína Papadáki; Selima Sfar	6; 2	6; 3
3	(Greece) (Tunisia)	Christína Papadáki / Christina Zachariadou; Issem Essaies / Selima Sfar	6; 2	6; 2

== See also ==
- Fed Cup structure
