= 2025 Billie Jean King Cup play-offs =

Subsection of tennis competition

The 2025 Billie Jean King Cup play-offs were held from 14 to 16 November 2025.

== Teams ==
Twenty-one teams played in seven groups of three, with the winners of each group advancing to the 2026 qualifying round. Group A was hosted in Monterrey (Mexico), Group B in Gorzów Wielkopolski (Poland), Group C in Córdoba (Argentina), Group D in Varaždin (Croatia), Group E in Hobart (Australia), Group F in Ismaning (Germany), and Group G in Bengaluru (India).

The twenty-one teams consisted of:

- Twelve losing teams from the qualifying round, in April 2025
- Nine winning teams from their Group I zone

Seven winners advanced to the 2026 qualifying round while losers would contest in their respective regional Group I event in 2026.

Qualified teams
#: Nations Ranking as of 22 September 2025.

Teams from qualifying round

- Canada (#6)
- Poland (#9)
- Slovakia (#10)
- Czech Republic (#11)
- Australia (#12)
- Germany (#13)
- Netherlands (#14)
- Romania (#15)
- Switzerland (#16)
- Brazil (#21)
- Colombia (#23)
- Denmark (#26)

Teams from Group I zones

- Belgium (#18)
- Slovenia (#19)
- Mexico (#20)
- Argentina (#24)
- Turkey (#25)
- India (#27)
- Croatia (#28)
- Portugal (#30)
- New Zealand (#31)

== Results summary ==
2026 Qualifying round
2026 Regional Group I event

=== Overview ===
G = Group, T = Ties, M = Matches, S = Sets, (H) = Hosts

G	Winner				Runner-up				Third			
G	Country	T	M	S	Country	T	M	S	Country	T	M	S
A	Canada [1]	2–0	4–1	9–2	Mexico (H)	1–1	2–3	4–7	Denmark	0–2	2–4	5–9
B	Poland [2] (H)	2–0	6–0	12–0	Romania	1–1	3–3	6–8	New Zealand	0–2	0–6	2–12
C	Switzerland	2–0	4–2	8–4	Argentina (H)	1–1	4–2	8–5	Slovakia [3]	0–2	1–5	3–10
D	Czech Republic [4]	2–0	5–1	10–3	Croatia (H)	1–1	3–3	7–6	Colombia	0–2	1–5	2–10
E	Australia [5] (H)	2–0	5–0	10–2	Brazil	1–1	3–2	8–5	Portugal	0–2	0–6	1–12
F	Belgium	2–0	4–1	8–4	Turkey	1–1	3–3	7–8	Germany [6] (H)	0–2	1–4	5–8
G	Slovenia	2–0	4–2	9–6	Netherlands [7]	1–1	4–2	9–4	India (H)	0–2	1–5	3–11

=== Group A ===
Venue: Monterrey, Mexico
Surface: Hard

Pos.	Country	Ties W–L	Matches W–L	Sets W–L	Games W–L
1	Canada [1]	2–0	4–1	9–2 (82%)	68–42 (62%)
2	Mexico (H)	1–1	2–3	4–7 (36%)	49–58 (46%)
3	Denmark	0–2	2–4	5–9 (36%)	64–81 (44%)

==== Mexico vs. Denmark ====
Mexico
2
Monterrey, Mexico
14 November 2025
Hard

Denmark
1

			1	2	3
1	(Mexico) (Denmark)	Victoria Rodríguez; Rebecca Munk Mortensen	4; 6	4; 6
2	(Mexico) (Denmark)	Renata Zarazúa; Johanne Svendsen	5; 7	6; 3	6; 3
3	(Mexico) (Denmark)	Giuliana Olmos / Renata Zarazúa; Rebecca Munk Mortensen / Johanne Svendsen	6; 3	7; 5

==== Canada vs. Denmark ====
Canada
2
Monterrey, Mexico
15 November 2025
Hard

Denmark
1

			1	2	3
1	(Canada) (Denmark)	Cadence Brace; Rebecca Munk Mortensen	6; 3	6^{4} 7^{7}	6^{4} 7^{7}
2	(Canada) (Denmark)	Victoria Mboko; Johanne Svendsen	7; 5	6; 3
3	(Canada) (Denmark)	Gabriela Dabrowski / Victoria Mboko; Emma Kamper / Johanne Svendsen	6; 2	6; 4

==== Canada vs. Mexico ====
Canada
2
Monterrey, Mexico
16 November 2025
Hard

Mexico
0

			1	2	3
1	(Canada) (Mexico)	Carson Branstine; Julia García Ruiz	6; 3	7^{7} 6^{5}
2	(Canada) (Mexico)	Victoria Mboko; Renata Zarazúa	6; 1	6; 1
3	(Canada) (Mexico)	Gabriela Dabrowski / Victoria Mboko; Giuliana Olmos / Renata Zarazúa				not played

=== Group B ===
Venue: Gorzów Wielkopolski, Poland
Surface: Hard (i)

Pos.	Country	Ties W–L	Matches W–L	Sets W–L	Games W–L
1	Poland [2] (H)	2–0	6–0	12–0 (100%)	72–23 (76%)
2	Romania	1–1	3–3	6–8 (43%)	48–54 (47%)
3	New Zealand	0–2	0–6	2–12 (14%)	31–74 (30%)

==== Poland vs. New Zealand ====
Poland
3
Gorzów Wielkopolski, Poland
14 November 2025
Hard (i)

New Zealand
0

			1	2	3
1	(Poland) (New Zealand)	Katarzyna Kawa; Vivian Yang	6; 4	6; 4
2	(Poland) (New Zealand)	Iga Świątek; Elyse Tse	6; 0	6; 1
3	(Poland) (New Zealand)	Linda Klimovičová / Martyna Kubka; Jade Otway / Erin Routliffe	6; 2	6; 2

==== Romania vs. New Zealand ====
Romania
3
Gorzów Wielkopolski, Poland
15 November 2025
Hard (i)

New Zealand
0

			1	2	3
1	(Romania) (New Zealand)	Elena Ruxandra Bertea; Vivian Yang	6; 2	6; 1
2	(Romania) (New Zealand)	Gabriela Lee; Elyse Tse	4; 6	6; 0	6; 1
3	(Romania) (New Zealand)	Mara Gae / Monica Niculescu; Jade Otway / Erin Routliffe	6; 2	3; 6	10; 5

==== Poland vs. Romania ====
Poland
3
Gorzów Wielkopolski, Poland
16 November 2025
Hard (i)

Romania
0

			1	2	3
1	(Poland) (Romania)	Linda Klimovičová; Elena Ruxandra Bertea	6; 2	6; 1
2	(Poland) (Romania)	Iga Świątek; Gabriela Lee	6; 2	6; 0
3	(Poland) (Romania)	Katarzyna Kawa / Martyna Kubka; Mara Gae / Monica Niculescu	6; 2	6; 3

=== Group C ===
Venue: Córdoba, Argentina
Surface: Clay

Pos.	Country	Ties W–L	Matches W–L	Sets W–L	Games W–L
1	Switzerland	2–0	4–2	8–4 (67%)	59–55 (52%)
2	Argentina (H)	1–1	4–2	8–5 (62%)	65–50 (57%)
3	Slovakia [3]	0–2	1–5	3–10 (23%)	52–71 (42%)

==== Slovakia vs. Argentina ====
Slovakia
0
Córdoba, Argentina
14 November 2025
Clay

Argentina
3

			1	2	3
1	(Slovakia) (Argentina)	Viktória Hrunčáková; Julia Riera	2; 6	1; 6
2	(Slovakia) (Argentina)	Rebecca Šramková; Solana Sierra	2; 6	4; 6
3	(Slovakia) (Argentina)	Katarína Kužmová / Nina Vargová; Jazmín Ortenzi / Julia Riera	4; 6	6; 3	4; 6

==== Slovakia vs. Switzerland ====
Slovakia
1
Córdoba, Argentina
15 November 2025
Clay

Switzerland
2

			1	2	3
1	(Slovakia) (Switzerland)	Viktória Hrunčáková; Susan Bandecchi	7; 5	6; 2
2	(Slovakia) (Switzerland)	Rebecca Šramková; Simona Waltert	4; 6	4; 6
3	(Slovakia) (Switzerland)	Katarína Kužmová / Nina Vargová; Céline Naef / Simona Waltert	5; 7	3; 6

==== Switzerland vs. Argentina ====
Switzerland
2
Córdoba, Argentina
16 November 2025
Clay

Argentina
1

			1	2	3
1	(Switzerland) (Argentina)	Susan Bandecchi; Julia Riera	2; 6	0; 6
2	(Switzerland) (Argentina)	Simona Waltert; Solana Sierra	6; 3	7^{10} 6^{8}
3	(Switzerland) (Argentina)	Céline Naef / Simona Waltert; Jazmín Ortenzi / Julia Riera	6; 4	6; 1

=== Group D ===
Venue: Varaždin, Croatia
Surface: Hard (i)

Pos.	Country	Ties W–L	Matches W–L	Sets W–L	Games W–L
1	Czech Republic [4]	2–0	5–1	10–3 (77%)	73–44 (62%)
2	Croatia (H)	1–1	3–3	7–6 (54%)	61–59 (51%)
3	Colombia	0–2	1–5	2–10 (17%)	33–64 (34%)

==== Czech Republic vs. Colombia ====
Czech Republic
3
Varaždin, Croatia
14 November 2025
Hard (i)

Colombia
0

			1	2	3
1	(Czech Republic) (Colombia)	Nikola Bartůňková; Yuliana Lizarazo	6; 3	6; 1
2	(Czech Republic) (Colombia)	Linda Nosková; Camila Osorio	6; 2	6; 2
3	(Czech Republic) (Colombia)	Lucie Havlíčková / Dominika Šalková; María Paulina Pérez / María Torres Murcia	6; 1	6; 2

==== Colombia vs. Croatia ====
Colombia
1
Varaždin, Croatia
15 November 2025
Hard (i)

Croatia
2

			1	2	3
1	(Colombia) (Croatia)	Yuliana Lizarazo; Petra Marčinko	3; 6	0; 6
2	(Colombia) (Croatia)	Camila Osorio; Antonia Ružić	6; 1	6; 3
3	(Colombia) (Croatia)	Yuliana Lizarazo / Camila Osorio; Jana Fett / Petra Marčinko	4; 6	3; 6

==== Czech Republic vs. Croatia ====
Czech Republic
2
Varaždin, Croatia
16 November 2025
Hard (i)

Croatia
1

			1	2	3
1	(Czech Republic) (Croatia)	Nikola Bartůňková; Petra Marčinko	3; 6	6^{6} 7^{8}
2	(Czech Republic) (Croatia)	Linda Nosková; Antonia Ružić	7; 5	6; 4
3	(Czech Republic) (Croatia)	Lucie Havlíčková / Linda Nosková; Jana Fett / Petra Marčinko	6; 2	3; 6	6; 3

=== Group E ===
Venue: Hobart, Australia
Surface: Hard

Pos.	Country	Ties W–L	Matches W–L	Sets W–L	Games W–L
1	Australia [5] (H)	2–0	5–0	10–2 (83%)	68–45 (60%)
2	Brazil	1–1	3–2	8–5 (62%)	64–57 (53%)
3	Portugal	0–2	0–6	1–12 (8%)	49–79 (38%)

==== Australia vs. Portugal ====
Australia
3
Hobart, Australia
14 November 2025
Hard

Portugal
0

			1	2	3
1	(Australia) (Portugal)	Kimberly Birrell; Matilde Jorge	6; 4	6; 4
2	(Australia) (Portugal)	Maya Joint; Francisca Jorge	7; 5	7; 5
3	(Australia) (Portugal)	Storm Hunter / Ellen Perez; Matilde Jorge / Francisca Jorge	6; 1	6; 3

==== Brazil vs. Portugal ====
Brazil
3
Hobart, Australia
15 November 2025
Hard

Portugal
0

			1	2	3
1	(Brazil) (Portugal)	Nauhany Vitória Leme da Silva; Matilde Jorge	7; 5	6; 4
2	(Brazil) (Portugal)	Laura Pigossi; Francisca Jorge	6; 4	6; 4
3	(Brazil) (Portugal)	Ingrid Martins / Luisa Stefani; Inês Murta / Angelina Voloshchuk	6; 1	4; 6	6; 3

==== Australia vs. Brazil ====
Australia
2
Hobart, Australia
16 November 2025
Hard

Brazil
0

			1	2	3
1	(Australia) (Brazil)	Kimberly Birrell; Nauhany Vitória Leme da Silva	6; 4	3; 6	6; 1
2	(Australia) (Brazil)	Maya Joint; Laura Pigossi	2; 6	7; 5	6; 1
3	(Australia) (Brazil)	Storm Hunter / Ellen Perez; Ingrid Martins / Luisa Stefani				not played

=== Group F ===
Venue: Ismaning, Germany
Surface: Hard (i)

Pos.	Country	Ties W–L	Matches W–L	Sets W–L	Games W–L
1	Belgium	2–0	4–1	8–4 (67%)	61–57 (52%)
2	Turkey	1–1	3–3	7–8 (47%)	70–66 (51%)
3	Germany [6] (H)	0–2	1–4	5–8 (38%)	51–59 (46%)

==== Germany vs. Turkey ====
Germany
1
Ismaning, Germany
14 November 2025
Hard (i)

Turkey
2

			1	2	3
1	(Germany) (Turkey)	Ella Seidel; Berfu Cengiz	6; 1	6; 1
2	(Germany) (Turkey)	Eva Lys; Zeynep Sönmez	2; 6	6; 4	0; 6
3	(Germany) (Turkey)	Anna-Lena Friedsam / Jule Niemeier; Ayla Aksu / Zeynep Sönmez	6; 2	2; 6	4; 6

==== Belgium vs. Turkey ====
Belgium
2
Ismaning, Germany
15 November 2025
Hard (i)

Turkey
1

			1	2	3
1	(Belgium) (Turkey)	Sofia Costoulas; Ayla Aksu	3; 6	1; 6
2	(Belgium) (Turkey)	Hanne Vandewinkel; Zeynep Sönmez	6; 4	6; 4
3	(Belgium) (Turkey)	Sofia Costoulas / Magali Kempen; Ayla Aksu / İpek Öz	4; 6	7^{7} 6^{1}	7^{9} 6^{7}

==== Germany vs. Belgium ====
Germany
0
Ismaning, Germany
16 November 2025
Hard (i)

Belgium
2

			1	2	3
1	(Germany) (Belgium)	Anna-Lena Friedsam; Jeline Vandromme	6^{0} 7^{7}	6; 2	3; 6
2	(Germany) (Belgium)	Ella Seidel; Hanne Vandewinkel	0; 6	4; 6
3	(Germany) (Belgium)	Tessa Johanna Brockmann / Jule Niemeier; Magali Kempen / Jeline Vandromme				not played

=== Group G ===
Venue: Bengaluru, India
Surface: Hard

Pos.	Country	Ties W–L	Matches W–L	Sets W–L	Games W–L
1	Slovenia	2–0	4–2	9–6 (60%)	71–58 (55%)
2	Netherlands [7]	1–1	4–2	9–4 (69%)	70–47 (60%)
3	India (H)	0–2	1–5	3–11 (21%)	37–73 (34%)

==== Netherlands vs. Slovenia ====
Netherlands
1
Bengaluru, India
14 November 2025
Hard

Slovenia
2

			1	2	3
1	(Netherlands) (Slovenia)	Arantxa Rus; Tamara Zidanšek	1; 6	6^{6} 7^{8}
2	(Netherlands) (Slovenia)	Suzan Lamens; Kaja Juvan	6^{5} 7^{7}	6; 4	3; 6
3	(Netherlands) (Slovenia)	Suzan Lamens / Demi Schuurs; Dalila Jakupović / Nika Radišić	6; 4	6; 0

==== Slovenia vs. India ====
Slovenia
2
Bengaluru, India
15 November 2025
Hard

India
1

			1	2	3
1	(Slovenia) (India)	Tamara Zidanšek; Shrivalli Bhamidipaty	6; 3	4; 6	6; 1
2	(Slovenia) (India)	Kaja Juvan; Sahaja Yamalapalli	6; 4	6; 2
3	(Slovenia) (India)	Dalila Jakupović / Nika Radišić; Ankita Raina / Prarthana Thombare	6; 1	3; 6	7; 10

==== Netherlands vs. India ====
Netherlands
3
Bengaluru, India
16 November 2025
Hard

India
0

			1	2	3
1	(Netherlands) (India)	Anouk Koevermans; Shrivalli Bhamidipaty	6; 2	6; 4
2	(Netherlands) (India)	Suzan Lamens; Sahaja Yamalapalli	6; 2	6; 3
3	(Netherlands) (India)	Suzan Lamens / Demi Schuurs; Ankita Raina / Prarthana Thombare	6; 1	6; 1
