= 2026 Billie Jean King Cup finals =

- Date: 22–27 September 2026
- Edition: 63rd
- Draw: 8 teams
- Surface: Hard (Indoor)
- Location: Shenzhen, China
- Venue: Shenzhen Bay Sports Center

Champions
- Czech Republic
- Billie Jean King Cup

The Billie Jean King Cup Finals is the highest level of the Billie Jean King Cup tennis team competition in 2026. The event was held in Shenzhen, China on 22–27 September 2026. The ties were contested in a best-of-three rubbers format, played on one day, consisting of two singles and, where needed, followed by a doubles rubber. The finals featured 8 teams competing in a knockout format.

Czech Republic defeated Ukraine 2–0 in the final. It was twelfth title for Czech Republic and first final for Ukraine.

Italy were the two-time defending champions, but they lost to Ukraine in the semifinals.

== Participating teams ==
8 nations took part in the Finals. The qualification is as follows:

- 7 qualifying round winners
- 1 host nation (China)

Participating teams
Belgium	China (H)	Czech Republic	Great Britain
Italy (TH)	Kazakhstan	Spain	Ukraine

=== Seeds ===
1. Italy (semifinals)
2. Great Britain (quarterfinals)
3. Ukraine (final)
4. Spain (semifinals)

=== Team nominations ===
SR = Singles ranking, DR = Doubles ranking. Rankings are as of 21 September 2026.

Belgium
Player	SR	DR
Hanne Vandewinkel	84	333
Greet Minnen	217	928
Jana Otzipka	474	427
Magali Kempen	–	34
Lara Salden	–	108
Captain: Wim Fissette

China
Player	SR	DR
Zheng Qinwen	52	–
Zhang Shuai	55	7
Wang Xiyu	83	361
Guo Hanyu	235	16
Jiang Xinyu	–	21
Captain: Zheng Jie

Czech Republic
Player	SR	DR
Linda Nosková	6	37
Karolína Muchová	8	166
Marie Bouzková	26	39
Sára Bejlek	28	1620
Kateřina Siniaková	53	1
Captain: Barbora Strýcová

Great Britain
Player	SR	DR
Katie Boulter	54	490
Harriet Dart	115	80
Sonay Kartal	127	1620
Mika Stojsavljevic	271	259
Jodie Burrage	729	519
Captain: Anne Keothavong

Italy
Player	SR	DR
Jasmine Paolini	20	25
Elisabetta Cocciaretto	67	313
Lucia Bronzetti	130	1719
Tyra Caterina Grant	150	667
Sara Errani	–	13
Captain: Tathiana Garbin

Kazakhstan
Player	SR	DR
Yulia Putintseva	79	343
Sonja Zhiyenbayeva	384	380
Zhibek Kulambayeva	475	105
Anna Danilina	–	6
Captain: Yuriy Schukin

Spain
Player	SR	DR
Cristina Bucșa	35	14
Kaitlin Quevedo	73	599
Jéssica Bouzas Maneiro	93	1121
Marina Bassols Ribera	129	524
Sara Sorribes Tormo	188	106
Captain: Carla Suárez Navarro

Ukraine
Player	SR	DR
Elina Svitolina	7	–
Anhelina Kalinina	48	140
Katarina Zavatska	262	1057
Lyudmyla Kichenok	–	52
Captain: Illya Marchenko

=== Bracket ===
Quarterfinals
1	Italy	2
China	1
3	Ukraine	2
Belgium	1
Kazakhstan	1
4	Spain	2
Czech Republic	2
2	Great Britain	0

Semifinals
1	Italy	0
3	Ukraine	2
4	Spain	0
Czech Republic	2

Finals
3	Ukraine	0
Czech Republic	2

== Results ==
=== Quarterfinals ===
==== Czech Republic vs. Great Britain ====
Czech Republic
2
Shenzhen, China
22 September 2026
Hard (i)

Great Britain
0

			1	2	3
1	(Czech Republic) (United Kingdom)	Marie Bouzková; Sonay Kartal	7^{7} 6^{2}	4; 6	6; 4
2	(Czech Republic) (United Kingdom)	Linda Nosková; Katie Boulter	6; 2	7^{7} 6^{3}
3	(Czech Republic) (United Kingdom)	Karolína Muchová / Kateřina Siniaková; Jodie Burrage / Harriet Dart				not played

==== Kazakhstan vs. Spain ====
Kazakhstan
1
Shenzhen, China
23 September 2026
Hard (i)

Spain
2

			1	2	3
1	(Kazakhstan) (Spain)	Sonja Zhiyenbayeva; Jéssica Bouzas Maneiro	2; 6	2; 6
2	(Kazakhstan) (Spain)	Yulia Putintseva; Cristina Bucșa	6; 2	3; 6	6; 1
3	(Kazakhstan) (Spain)	Anna Danilina / Zhibek Kulambayeva; Cristina Bucșa / Sara Sorribes Tormo	2; 6	5; 7

==== Ukraine vs. Belgium ====
Ukraine
2
Shenzhen, China
24 September 2026
Hard (i)

Belgium
1

			1	2	3
1	(Ukraine) (Belgium)	Anhelina Kalinina; Jana Otzipka	6^{6} 7^{8}	6; 1	6; 1
2	(Ukraine) (Belgium)	Elina Svitolina; Greet Minnen	7^{7} 6^{5}	4; 6	4; 6
3	(Ukraine) (Belgium)	Anhelina Kalinina / Lyudmyla Kichenok; Magali Kempen / Lara Salden	6; 3	6; 3

==== Italy vs. China ====
Italy
2
Shenzhen, China
24 September 2026
Hard (i)

China
1

			1	2	3
1	(Italy) (China)	Elisabetta Cocciaretto; Zhang Shuai	0; 6	2; 6
2	(Italy) (China)	Jasmine Paolini; Zheng Qinwen	6; 3	7^{7} 6^{4}
3	(Italy) (China)	Sara Errani / Jasmine Paolini; Guo Hanyu / Jiang Xinyu	6; 3	5; 7	6; 3

=== Semifinals ===
==== Spain vs. Czech Republic ====
Spain
0
Shenzhen, China
25 September 2026
Hard (i)

Czech Republic
2

			1	2	3
1	(Spain) (Czech Republic)	Jéssica Bouzas Maneiro; Karolína Muchová	5; 7	4; 6
2	(Spain) (Czech Republic)	Cristina Bucșa; Linda Nosková	6^{5} 7^{7}	2; 6
3	(Spain) (Czech Republic)	Cristina Bucșa / Sara Sorribes Tormo; Marie Bouzková / Kateřina Siniaková				not played

==== Italy vs. Ukraine ====
Italy
0
Shenzhen, China
26 September 2026
Hard (i)

Ukraine
2

			1	2	3
1	(Italy) (Ukraine)	Tyra Caterina Grant; Anhelina Kalinina	3; 6	4; 6
2	(Italy) (Ukraine)	Jasmine Paolini; Elina Svitolina	2; 6	2; 6
3	(Italy) (Ukraine)	Sara Errani / Jasmine Paolini; Anhelina Kalinina / Lyudmyla Kichenok				not played

=== Final ===
==== Ukraine vs. Czech Republic ====
Ukraine
0
Shenzhen, China
27 September 2026
Hard (i)

Czech Republic
2

			1	2	3
1	(Ukraine) (Czech Republic)	Anhelina Kalinina; Karolína Muchová	2; 6	3; 6
2	(Ukraine) (Czech Republic)	Elina Svitolina; Linda Nosková	3; 6	6^{5} 7^{7}
3	(Ukraine) (Czech Republic)	Anhelina Kalinina / Lyudmyla Kichenok; Marie Bouzková / Kateřina Siniaková				not played
