= Czech Republic Billie Jean King Cup team =

Czech national women's tennis team

Czech Republic
- Other names: Czechia
- Captain: Barbora Strýcová
- Nations Ranking: 2 ▲3 (28 September 2026)
- Highest ranking: 1 (2012–2013, 2014–2019)
- Colors: blue & red
- First year: 1963 (as Czechoslovakia); 1993 (as the Czech Republic)
- Years played: 55
- Ties played (W–L): 164 (121–43)
- Years in World Group: 47 (95–35)
- Titles: 12 (1975, 1983, 1984, 1985, 1988, 2011, 2012, 2014, 2015, 2016, 2018, 2026)
- Most total wins: Helena Suková (57–16)
- Most singles wins: Helena Suková (45–11)
- Most doubles wins: Hana Mandlíková (16–6)
- Best doubles team: Helena Suková / Hana Mandlíková (7–3)
- Most ties played: Helena Suková (54)
- Most years played: Lucie Šafářová (14)

The Czech Republic women's national tennis team is the representative national team of the Czech Republic (also known as Czechia) in Billie Jean King Cup competition. The Czech Republic team in its current incarnation began competing in 1993. It is recognised as the official successor to the Czechoslovak team.

Czechoslovakia won the Billie Jean King Cup five times between 1975 and 1988 (when the competition was known as the Federation Cup), but the victory in 2011 (by which time the competition had been renamed the Fed Cup) was the team's first win as the Czech Republic. They have since won the competition six more times, in 2012, 2014, 2015, 2016, 2018, and 2026.

Martina Navratilova, one of the Czechoslovak team's greatest players, helped guide the team to victory in 1975. In 1981 she became a US citizen and in later tournaments, notably the 1986 Federation Cup final, she played for the United States against her former nation.

== Current team ==
Rankings as of 31 August 2026.

Name	Born	First	Last		Ties	Win/Loss			Ranks	
Name	Born	First	Year	Tie	Ties	Sin	Dou	Tot	Sin	Dou
Linda Nosková	November 17, 2004	2023	2026	Switzerland	7	6–2	1–1	7–3	6	38
Karolína Muchová	August 21, 1996	2019	2023	Ukraine	5	2–1	1–1	3–2	7	166
Marie Bouzková	July 21, 1998	2023	2026	Switzerland	5	4–2	0–1	4–3	26	41
Kateřina Siniaková	May 10, 1996	2017	2024	Poland	13	5–3	5–6	10–9	42	1
Sára Bejlek	January 31, 2006	2023	2024	—	2	0–0	0–0	0–0	30	1641

== Players ==
Year	Team			
1963	Věra Suková	Markéta Prochová		
1964	Jitka Volavková	Vlasta Vopičková		
1966	Vlasta Vopičková	Jitka Volavková		
1968	Vlasta Vopičková	Jitka Volavková		
1969	Alena Palmeová	Vlasta Vopičková		
1970	Alena Palmeová	Vlasta Vopičková		
1975	Renáta Tomanová	Martina Navrátilová	Mirka Koželuhová	
1978	Regina Maršíková	Hana Mandlíková	Renáta Tomanová	Hana Strachoňová
1979	Regina Maršíková	Hana Mandlíková	Renáta Tomanová	
1980	Hana Mandlíková	Renáta Tomanová	Iva Budařová	Yvona Brzáková
1981	Hana Mandlíková	Renáta Tomanová	Helena Suková	Kateřina Skronská
1982	Hana Mandlíková	Helena Suková	Iva Budařová	
1983	Hana Mandlíková	Helena Suková	Iva Budařová	Marcela Skuherská
1984	Hana Mandlíková	Helena Suková	Iva Budařová	Marcela Skuherská
1985	Regina Maršíková	Hana Mandlíková	Helena Suková	Andrea Holíková
1986	Regina Maršíková	Hana Mandlíková	Helena Suková	Andrea Holíková
1987	Jana Novotná	Hana Mandlíková	Helena Suková	Regina Rajchrtová
1988	Jana Novotná	Jana Pospíšilová	Radka Zrubáková	Helena Suková
1989	Jana Novotná	Jana Pospíšilová	Regina Rajchrtová	Helena Suková
1990	Jana Novotná	Regina Rajchrtová	Eva Švíglerová	
1991	Jana Novotná	Regina Rajchrtová	Radka Zrubáková	Eva Švíglerová
1992	Jana Novotná	Radka Zrubáková	Andrea Strnadová	Helena Suková
1993	Radka Zrubáková	Helena Suková	Jana Novotná	Andrea Strnadová
1994	Petra Langrová	Ludmila Richterová	Radka Bobková	Eva Martincová
1995	Petra Langrová	Radka Bobková	Helena Suková	Jana Novotná
1996	Ludmila Richterová	Helena Suková	Jana Novotná	
1997	Ludmila Richterová	Eva Martincová	Jana Novotná	Adriana Gerši
1997	Sandra Kleinová			
1998	Ludmila Richterová	Jana Novotná	Adriana Gerši	Denisa Chládková
1998	Radka Bobková	Květa Peschke	Lenka Němečková	Michaela Paštiková
1999	Květa Peschke	Helena Vildová	Denisa Chládková	Dája Bedáňová
2000	Dája Bedáňová	Květa Peschke	Denisa Chládková	
2001	Denisa Chládková	Květa Peschke	Petra Cetkovská	Alena Vašková
2002	Sandra Kleinová	Iveta Benešová	Eva Birnerová	Klára Koukalová
2002	Petra Cetkovská	Barbora Strýcová		
2003	Dája Bedáňová	Klára Koukalová	Iveta Benešová	Eva Birnerová
2003	Barbora Strýcová			
2004	Libuše Průšová	Lucie Šafářová	Klára Koukalová	Nicole Vaidišová
2004	Michaela Paštiková	Barbora Strýcová		
2005	Klára Koukalová	Nicole Vaidišová	Iveta Benešová	Květa Peschke
2006	Nicole Vaidišová	Klára Koukalová	Lucie Šafářová	Květa Peschke
2006	Iveta Benešová	Barbora Strýcová		
2007	Nicole Vaidišová	Lucie Šafářová	Iveta Benešová	Barbora Strýcová
2007	Petra Kvitová			
2008	Nicole Vaidišová	Petra Cetkovská	Lucie Šafářová	Petra Kvitová
2008	Květa Peschke	Iveta Benešová		
2009	Iveta Benešová	Petra Kvitová	Lucie Šafářová	Květa Peschke
2010	Lucie Hradecká	Petra Kvitová	Lucie Šafářová	Květa Peschke
2011	Petra Kvitová	Lucie Šafářová	Iveta Benešová	Barbora Strýcová
2011	Lucie Hradecká	Květa Peschke		
2012	Petra Kvitová	Iveta Benešová	Lucie Šafářová	Barbora Strýcová
2012	Lucie Hradecká	Andrea Hlaváčková		
2013	Petra Kvitová	Lucie Šafářová	Lucie Hradecká	Andrea Hlaváčková
2014	Petra Kvitová	Lucie Šafářová	Klára Koukalová	Barbora Strýcová
2014	Andrea Hlaváčková	Lucie Hradecká		
2015	Petra Kvitová	Karolína Plíšková	Tereza Smitková	Denisa Allertová
2015	Lucie Hradecká	Lucie Šafářová	Barbora Strýcová	
2016	Petra Kvitová	Karolína Plíšková	Barbora Strýcová	Denisa Allertová
2016	Lucie Hradecká			
2017	Karolína Plíšková	Barbora Strýcová	Kateřina Siniaková	Lucie Šafářová
2017	Kristýna Plíšková	Denisa Allertová	Markéta Vondroušová	
2018	Karolína Plíšková	Barbora Strýcová	Petra Kvitová	Lucie Šafářová
2018	Kateřina Siniaková	Barbora Krejčíková		
2019	Karolína Plíšková	Kateřina Siniaková	Markéta Vondroušová	Barbora Krejčíková
2019	Lucie Šafářová	Karolína Muchová	Marie Bouzková	
2020–21	Barbora Krejčíková	Kateřina Siniaková	Markéta Vondroušová	Lucie Hradecká
2020–21	Tereza Martincová			
2022	Markéta Vondroušová	Tereza Martincová	Marie Bouzková	Linda Fruhvirtová
2022	Karolína Muchová	Barbora Krejčíková	Karolína Plíšková	Kateřina Siniaková
2023	Barbora Krejčíková	Kateřina Siniaková	Karolína Muchová	Markéta Vondroušová
2023	Linda Nosková	Sára Bejlek	Marie Bouzková	
2024	Linda Nosková	Kateřina Siniaková	Marie Bouzková	Sára Bejlek
2024	Dominika Šalková			
2025	Linda Nosková	Marie Bouzková	Tereza Valentová	Dominika Šalková
2025	Tereza Krejčová	Lucie Havlíčková	Vendula Valdmannová	Nikola Bartůňková
2026	Linda Nosková	Marie Bouzková	Markéta Vondroušová	Tereza Valentová
2026	Lucie Havlíčková	Karolína Muchová	Kateřina Siniaková	Sára Bejlek

== Results ==
=== 1990–1999 ===
Year	Competition	Date	Location	Opponent	Score	Result
1995	Europe/Africa Zone Group I (Pool A)	17 April	Murcia (ESP)	Poland	3–0	Won
1995	Europe/Africa Zone Group I (Pool A)	18 April	Murcia (ESP)	(United Kingdom) Great Britain	3–0	Won
1995	Europe/Africa Zone Group I (Pool A)	19 April	Murcia (ESP)	Slovenia	1–2	Lost
1995	Europe/Africa Zone Group I – Knockout Stage	20 April	Murcia (ESP)	Slovenia	3–0	Won
1995	Europe/Africa Zone Group I – Knockout Stage	21 April	Murcia (ESP)	Belarus	3–0	Won
1995	World Group II play-offs	22–23 July	Prague (CZE)	Sweden	4–1	Won
1996	World Group II	27–28 April	Vancouver (CAN)	Canada	3–0	Won
1996	World Group play-offs	13–14 July	Plzeň (CZE)	Argentina	3–1	Won
1997	World Group, 1st Round	1–2 March	Mannheim (GER)	Germany	3–2	Won
1997	World Group, Semi-Final	12–13 July	Prague (CZE)	Netherlands	2–3	Lost
1998	World Group, 1st Round	18–19 April	Brno (CZE)	Switzerland	1–4	Lost
1998	World Group play-offs	25–26 July	Prague (CZE)	Italy	1–4	Lost
1999	World Group II	17–18 April	Minsk (BLR)	Belarus	4–1	Won

=== 2000–2009 ===
Year	Competition	Date	Location	Opponent	Score	Result
2000	World Group, Round Robin (Group B)	27 April	Bratislava (SVK)	Austria	2–1	Won
2000	World Group, Round Robin (Group B)	28 April	Bratislava (SVK)	Switzerland	2–1	Won
2000	World Group, Round Robin (Group B)	29 April	Bratislava (SVK)	Slovakia	2–1	Won
2000	World Group, Semi-final	21 November	Las Vegas (USA)	Spain	1–2	Lost
2001	World Group, Round Robin (Group A)	7 November	Madrid (ESP)	Russia	1–2	Lost
2001	World Group, Round Robin (Group A)	8 November	Madrid (ESP)	France	0–3	Lost
2001	World Group, Round Robin (Group A)	9 November	Madrid (ESP)	Argentina	1–2	Lost
2002	World Group, 1st Round	27–28 April	Bol (CRO)	Croatia	2–3	Lost
2002	World Group play-offs	20–21 July	Přerov (CZE)	Canada	5–0	Won
2003	World Group, 1st Round	26–27 April	Lowell, MA (USA)	United States	0–5	Lost
2003	World Group play-offs	19–20 July	Durban (RSA)	South Africa	4–1	Won
2004	World Group, 1st Round	24–25 April	Lecce (ITA)	Italy	1–3	Lost
2004	World Group play-offs	10–11 July	Tallinn (EST)	Estonia	3–2	Won
2005	World Group II	23–24 April	Prague (CZE)	Japan	3–2	Won
2005	World Group play-offs	9–10 July	Liberec (CZE)	Italy	2–3	Lost
2006	World Group II	22–23 April	Bangkok (THA)	Thailand	4–1	Won
2006	World Group play-offs	15–16 July	Cagnes-sur-Mer (FRA)	France	2–3	Lost
2007	World Group II	21–22 April	Bratislava (SVK)	Slovakia	5–0	Won
2007	World Group play-offs	14–15 July	Palafrugell (ESP)	Spain	2–3	Lost
2008	World Group II	2–3 February	Brno (CZE)	Slovakia	3–2	Won
2008	World Group play-offs	26–27 April	Ramat HaSharon (ISR)	Israel	3–2	Won
2009	World Group, 1st Round	7–8 February	Brno (CZE)	Spain	4–1	Won
2009	World Group, Semi-Final	25–26 April	Brno (CZE)	United States	2–3	Lost

=== 2010–2019 ===
Year	Competition	Date	Location	Opponent	Score	Result
2010	World Group, 1st Round	6–7 February	Brno (CZE)	Germany	3–2	Won
2010	World Group, Semi-Final	24–25 April	Rome (ITA)	Italy	0–5	Lost
2011	World Group, 1st Round	5–6 February	Bratislava (SVK)	Slovakia	3–2	Won
2011	World Group, Semi-Final	16–17 April	Charleroi (BEL)	Belgium	3–2	Won
2011	World Group, Final	5–6 November	Moscow (RUS)	Russia	3–2	Champion
2012	World Group, 1st Round	4–5 February	Stuttgart (GER)	Germany	4–1	Won
2012	World Group, Semi-Final	21–22 April	Ostrava (CZE)	Italy	4–1	Won
2012	World Group, Final	3–4 November	Prague (CZE)	Serbia	3–2	Champion
2013	World Group, 1st Round	9–10 February	Ostrava (CZE)	Australia	4–0	Won
2013	World Group, Semi-Final	20–21 April	Palermo (ITA)	Italy	1–3	Lost
2014	World Group, 1st Round	8–9 February	Seville (ESP)	Spain	3–2	Won
2014	World Group, Semi-Final	20–21 April	Ostrava (CZE)	Italy	4–0	Won
2014	World Group, Final	3–1 November	Prague (CZE)	Germany	3–1	Champion
2015	World Group, 1st Round	7–8 February	Quebec City (CAN)	Canada	4–0	Won
2015	World Group, Semi-Final	18–19 April	Ostrava (CZE)	France	3–1	Won
2015	World Group, Final	14–15 November	Prague (CZE)	Russia	3–2	Champion
2016	World Group, 1st Round	6–7 February	Cluj-Napoca (ROU)	Romania	3–2	Won
2016	World Group, Semi-Final	16–17 April	Lucerne (SUI)	Switzerland	3–2	Won
2016	World Group, Final	12–13 November	Strasbourg (FRA)	France	3–2	Champion
2017	World Group, 1st Round	11–12 February	Ostrava (CZE)	Spain	3–2	Won
2017	World Group, Semi-Final	22–23 April	Tampa (USA)	United States	2–3	Lost
2018	World Group, 1st Round	10–11 February	Prague (CZE)	Switzerland	3–1	Won
2018	World Group, Semi-Final	21–22 April	Stuttgart (GER)	Germany	4–1	Won
2018	World Group, Final	10–11 November	Prague (CZE)	United States	3–0	Champion
2019	World Group, 1st Round	9–10 February	Ostrava (CZE)	Romania	2–3	Lost
2019	World Group play-offs	20–21 April	Prostějov (CZE)	Canada	4–0	Won

=== 2020–2029 ===
Year	Competition	Date	Location	Opponent	Score	Result
2020–21	Finals, Group D	1–6 November 2021	Prague (CZE)	Germany	2–1	Won
2020–21	Finals, Group D	1–6 November 2021	Prague (CZE)	Switzerland	1–2	Lost
2022	Qualifying round	15–16 April 2022	Prague (CZE)	Great Britain	3–2	Won
2022	Finals	8–13 November 2022	Glasgow (GBR)	Poland	2–1	Won
2022	Finals	8–13 November 2022	Glasgow (GBR)	United States	2–1	Won
2022	Finals	8–13 November 2022	Glasgow (GBR)	Switzerland	0–2	Lost
2023	Qualifying round	14–15 April 2023	Antalya (TUR)	Ukraine	3–1	Won
2023	Finals	7–12 November 2023	Seville (ESP)	Switzerland	3–0	Won
2023	Finals	7–12 November 2023	Seville (ESP)	United States	2–1	Won
2023	Finals	7–12 November 2023	Seville (ESP)	Canada	1–2	Lost
2024	Finals	16 November 2024	Málaga (ESP)	Poland	1–2	Lost
2025	Qualifying round	10–12 April 2025	Ostrava (CZE)	Brazil	2–1	Won
2025	Qualifying round	10–12 April 2025	Ostrava (CZE)	Spain	1–2	Lost
2025	Play-offs, Group D	14–16 November 2025	Varaždin (CRO)	Colombia	3–0	Won
2025	Play-offs, Group D	14–16 November 2025	Varaždin (CRO)	Croatia	2–1	Won
2026	Qualifying round	10–11 April 2026	Biel (SUI)	Switzerland	3–2	Won
2026	Finals	22–27 September 2026	Shenzhen (CHN)	Great Britain	2–0	Won
2026	Finals	22–27 September 2026	Shenzhen (CHN)	Spain	2–0	Won
2026	Finals	22–27 September 2026	Shenzhen (CHN)	Ukraine	2–0	Champion

== See also ==
- Billie Jean King Cup
- Czech Republic Davis Cup team
- Czech Republic at the Hopman Cup
- Slovakia Billie Jean King Cup team
