= 1993 Federation Cup Europe/Africa Zone – Pool D =

International tennis competition

Group D of the 1993 Federation Cup Europe/Africa Zone was one of five pools in the Europe/Africa zone of the 1993 Federation Cup. Four teams competed in a round robin competition, with the top two teams advancing to the play-offs.

	(Latvia) LAT	(Hungary) HUN	(Romania) ROU	(Portugal) POR	RR; W–L	Set; W–L	Game; W–L	Standings
Latvia		2–1	3–0	2–1	3–0	13–6	104–77	1
Hungary	1–2		2–1	2–1	2–1	11–8	87–83	2
Romania	0–3	1–2		2–1	1–2	8–12	94–98	3
Portugal	1–2	1–2	1–2		0–3	8–14	87–114	4

== Romania vs. Portugal ==
Romania
2
City of Nottingham T.C., England
10 May 1993
Hard (outdoors)

Portugal
1

			1	2	3
1	(Romania) (Portugal)	Andreea Ehritt-Vanc; Joana Pedroso	6; 4	4; 6	6; 1
2	(Romania) (Portugal)	Ruxandra Dragomir; Sofia Prazeres	3; 6	6; 3	6; 8
3	(Romania) (Portugal)	Ruxandra Dragomir / Andreea Ehritt-Vanc; Joana Pedroso / Sofia Prazeres	3; 6	6; 1	6; 0

== Latvia vs. Hungary ==
Latvia
2
City of Nottingham T.C., England
11 May 1993
Hard (outdoors)

Hungary
1

			1	2	3
1	(Latvia) (Hungary)	Oksana Bushevitsa; Ágnes Muzamel	6^{8} 7^{10}	2; 6
2	(Latvia) (Hungary)	Larisa Neiland; Kata Györke	1; 6	6; 2	6; 4
3	(Latvia) (Hungary)	Agnese Blumberga / Larisa Neiland; Virág Csurgó / Kata Györke	6; 2	6; 0

== Latvia vs. Portugal ==
Latvia
2
City of Nottingham T.C., England
12 May 1993
Hard (outdoors)

Portugal
1

			1	2	3
1	(Latvia) (Portugal)	Agnese Blumberga; Joana Pedroso	6; 4	6; 2
2	(Latvia) (Portugal)	Larisa Neiland; Sofia Prazeres	6; 1	7; 5
3	(Latvia) (Portugal)	Agnese Blumberga / Oksana Bushevitsa; Joana Pedroso / Sofia Prazeres	6; 3	3; 6	4; 6

== Latvia vs. Romania ==
Latvia
3
City of Nottingham T.C., England
13 May 1993
Hard (outdoors)

Romania
0

			1	2	3
1	(Latvia) (Romania)	Agnese Blumberga; Andreea Ehritt-Vanc	7; 5	7; 5
2	(Latvia) (Romania)	Larisa Neiland; Ruxandra Dragomir	3; 6	6; 4	6; 2
3	(Latvia) (Romania)	Oksana Bushevitsa / Larisa Neiland; Ruxandra Dragomir / Andreea Ehritt-Vanc	4; 1			retired

== Hungary vs. Portugal ==
Hungary
2
City of Nottingham T.C., England
13 May 1993
Hard (outdoors)

Portugal
1

			1	2	3
1	(Hungary) (Portugal)	Ágnes Muzamel; Joana Pedroso	6; 4	6; 3
2	(Hungary) (Portugal)	Virág Csurgó; Sofia Prazeres	3; 6	2; 6
3	(Hungary) (Portugal)	Virág Csurgó / Kata Györke; Joana Pedroso / Sofia Prazeres	7^{8} 6^{6}	6; 0

== Hungary vs. Romania ==
Hungary
2
City of Nottingham T.C., England
14 May 1993
Hard (outdoors)

Romania
1

			1	2	3
1	(Hungary) (Romania)	Ágnes Muzamel; Isabela Martin	6; 3	6; 4
2	(Hungary) (Romania)	Kata Györke; Ruxandra Dragomir	4; 6	2; 6
3	(Hungary) (Romania)	Virág Csurgó / Kata Györke; Ruxandra Dragomir / Isabela Martin	6; 2	6; 4

== See also ==
- Fed Cup structure
