= TTF Ankara Tennis Training Center =

Tennis venue in Ankara, Turkey

- Interactive map of TTF Ankara Tennis Training Center
- Full name: TTF Ankara Tenis Eğitim Merkezi
- Location: Yenimahalle, Ankara, Turkey
- Coordinates: 39.94216°N 32.79327°E
- Owner: Turkish Tennis Federation (TFF)

Construction
- Opened: 20 August 2025; 14 months ago

TTF Ankara Tennis Training Center is a sports center in Ankara, Turkey. Owned by the Turkish Tennis Federation (TTF), it was opened in 2025.

The TFF Ankara Tennis Training Center was built to international standards by the Turkish Tennis Federation within the Atatürk Forest Farm and Zoo in Yenimahalle District of Ankara Province, Turkey.

Late October 2023, while the center was still in the final stages of construction, a test tournament for the facility was held at the Center Court in the form of the 100th Anniversary Republic Cup Masters Tennis Tournament with the participation of 398 athletes between the ages of 18-65. It was officially opened with a ceremony attended by high government officials and following tennis festival on 20 August 2025. The complex features a total of 13 tennis courts including a Center Court with 3,500 seating capacity, five hardcourts and seven clay courts. It is the first and the only tennis complex in Turkey to hold a tournament on courts of two different surfaces simultaneously. The facility is capable of hosting highest-leveldomestic and internatipnal tennis events.
