= Tennis at the 1997 Mediterranean Games =

The tennis competitions at the 1997 Mediterranean Games in Bari, Italy were played from June 14–19. Players competed in four events.

== Medal summary ==
=== Medalists ===
Event	Gold	Silver	Bronze
Men's singles	Vincenzo Santopadre; Italy	Alberto Martín; Spain	Fernando Vicente; Spain
Men's doubles	Vincenzo Santopadre and Gabrio Castrichella; Italy	Iztok Božič and Borut Urh; Slovenia	Alberto Martín and Fernando Vicente; Spain
Women's singles	Tathiana Garbin; Italy	Maria Paola Zavagli; Italy	Ana Alcázar; Spain
Women's doubles	Christína Papadáki and Christina Zachariadou; Greece	Tathiana Garbin and Maria Paola Zavagli; Italy	Duygu Akşit Oal and Gülberk Gültekin; Turkey

=== Medal table ===
Key:

* Host nation (Italy)

Rank	Nation	Gold	Silver	Bronze	Total
1	Italy*	3	2	0	5
2	Greece	1	0	0	1
3	Spain	0	1	3	4
4	Slovenia	0	1	0	1
5	Turkey	0	0	1	1
Totals (5 entries)		4	4	4	12
