= Natalia Biletskaya =

Ukrainian tennis player

Natalia Biletskaya Наталія Білецька
- Country (sports): Ukraine
- Born: 6 November 1972 (age 53)
- Turned pro: 1991
- Retired: 1995
- Prize money: $15,974

Singles
- Career record: 53–34
- Career titles: 2 ITF
- Highest ranking: No. 339 (8 October 1990)

Doubles
- Career record: 52–32
- Career titles: 3 ITF
- Highest ranking: No. 320 (30 July 1990)

Team competitions
- Fed Cup: 2–5

Natalia Biletskaya (Ukrainian: Наталія Білецька, born 6 November 1972) is a former female tennis player from Ukraine.

Playing for Ukraine at the Fed Cup, she has a win–loss record of 2–5.

== ITF Circuit finals ==
=== Singles: 4 (2 titles, 2 runner-ups) ===
$100,000 tournaments
$75,000 tournaments
$50,000 tournaments
$25,000 tournaments
$10,000 tournaments

Result	No.	Date	Tournament	Surface	Opponent	Score
Win	1.	8 April 1991	ITF Belgrade, Yugoslavia	Clay	(Socialist Federal Republic of Yugoslavia) Maja Murić	5–7, 6–3, 6–3
Loss	2.	26 October 1992	ITF Šiauliai, Lithuania	Hard	(Russia) Tatiana Panova	2–6, 6–3, 1–6
Loss	3.	24 October 1994	ITF Šiauliai, Lithuania	Hard	(Russia) Olga Ivanova	6–7^{(7–9)}, 3–6
Win	4.	9 October 1995	ITF Jūrmala, Latvia	Hard (i)	(Russia) Anna Linkova	7–6^{(7–3)}, 7–5

=== Doubles: 8 (3 titles, 5 runner-ups) ===
Result	No.	Date	Tournament	Surface	Partner	Opponents	Score
Loss	1.	26 March 1990	ITF Madrid, Spain	Clay	(Soviet Union) Svetlana Komleva	(Austria) Karin Kschwendt (Uruguay) Patricia Miller	6–4, 5–7, 3–6
Loss	2.	30 April 1990	ITF Lee-on-the-Solent, United Kingdom	Clay	(Soviet Union) Svetlana Komleva	(Sweden) Catarina Bernstein (Sweden) Annika Narbe	4–6, 4–6
Win	3.	24 May 1993	ITF Bytom, Poland	Clay	(Ukraine) Elena Tatarkova	(Bulgaria) Teodora Nedeva (Bulgaria) Antoaneta Pandjerova	w/o
Win	4.	4 October 1993	ITF Kyiv, Ukraine	Clay	(Moldova) Svetlana Komleva	(Ukraine) Dasha Kotova (Slovakia) Simona Nedorostová	3–6, 6–3, 2–0 ret.
Loss	5.	3 October 1994	ITF Kyiv, Ukraine	Clay	(Ukraine) Elena Tatarkova	(Belarus) Natalia Noreiko (Belarus) Marina Stets	6–2, 5–7, 3–6
Loss	6.	10 October 1994	ITF Odesa, Ukraine	Clay	(Ukraine) Natalia Bondarenko	(Belarus) Natalia Noreiko (Belarus) Marina Stets	6–7, 6–4, 4–6
Loss	7.	24 October 1994	ITF Šiauliai, Lithuania	Hard (i)	(Ukraine) Natalia Bondarenko	(Russia) Maria Marfina (Russia) Julia Lutrova	6–2, 3–6, 2–6
Win	8.	9 October 1995	ITF Jūrmala, Latvia	Hard (i)	(Ukraine) Natalia Bondarenko	(Belarus) Natalia Noreiko (Belarus) Marina Stets	7–5, 6–1
