= Myriam Berthé =

Senegalese tennis player

- Country (sports): Senegal
- Born: 21 October 1967 (age 58)

Singles
- Career record: 0–2

Doubles
- Career record: 0–2

Myriam Berthé (born 21 October 1967) is a Senegalese former professional tennis player.

== Career ==
A native of Dakar, Berthé is the daughter of national coach Cheikh Berthé and has had several siblings and cousins represent Senegal internationally. She was a three-time African junior champion and also enjoyed success at the All-Africa Games. In 1993 she represented Senegal in Federation Cup ties against Norway and Belgium.

Berthé was a championship winning player in the NJCAA for Midland College, Texas, where she had been recruited on the recommendation of alumnus and former Moroccan Davis Cup representative Mohammed Ridaoui. In the 1990–91 season she won the ITCA Region Championships, National Junior College Championships and National Small College Championships. She spent a season in the NCAA Division I with Pepperdine University, before transferring to Kennesaw State University in Georgia and became the first ever Kennesaw player to earn All-American honors.

In 2004, Berthé received a two-year prison sentence for committing fraud against a recently widowed Boca Raton resident, who she had briefly lived with. She was found guilty of grand theft, scheme to defraud, exploitation of the elderly and identity theft. Following her time in prison she faced deportation.
