= Turkish Tennis Federation =

Governing body of tennis in Turkey

- Sport: Tennis; Wheelchair tennis
- Jurisdiction: Turkey
- Abbreviation: TTF
- Founded: 1953; 73 years ago
- Affiliation: ITF
- Regional affiliation: Tennis Europe
- Headquarters: Ankara
- Location: Turkey
- President: Şafak Müderrisgil

Official website
- www.ttf.org.tr
- (Turkey)

The Turkish Tennis Federation (TTF) (Turkish: Türkiye Tenis Federasyonu) is the governing body of tennis and wheelchair tennis in Turkey. Formed in 1953, it is based in Ankara, Turkey. The TTF is a member of International Tennis Federation (ITF) and the Tennis Europe. Federation's president is Şafak Müderrisgil since 11 November 2024.

== Overview ==
The Turkish Tennis Federation first began its activities in 1923 under the umbrella of the Federation of Sporting Games, a division of the Turkish Training Societies Alliance. It was established as an independent federation as the Turkish Tennis Federation in 1953, and became autonomous with a law enacted in 2004.

The TTF is headquartered in Ankara, and has main offices in Istanbul and Ankara. It has facilities in Ankara, the Tennis Training Center and in İzmir, the National Tennis Training Center and Infrastructure Facilities . The Federation comprises nearly 150 federated clubs. The Federation is subject to private law, has an independent status, and is a legal entity. By law, it is a member of, and subject to the rules of the International Tennis Federation (ITF), the Tennis Europe (TE), formerly European Tennis Association, the Women's Tennis Association (WTA), and the Association of Tennis Professionals (ATP).

== Organization ==
The central organization of the TFF is as follows:

- General Assembly
- Board of Directors*
- Audit Board
- Disciplinary Board
- General Secretariat

The Subsidiary boards are:

- Central Referee Board
- Legal Board
- Health and Anti-Doping Board*
- Education Board
- Technical Board
- Foreign Relationbns Board
- Other subsidiary boards

== Presidents ==
=== Turkish Training Societies Alliance era (1923-1953) ===
- Server Bey (1923-1930)
- Süreyya Genca (1930-1939)
- Kerim Bükey (1939-1943* Vedat Abut (1943-1948)
- Faik Gökay (1948-1950)
- Hasan Akey (1950-1953)

=== Turkish Tennis Federation era (1953-present) ===
- Medeni Berk (1955-1958)
- Ulvi Yenal (1958-1960)
- Asım Kurt (1960-1961)
- Bülent Savcı (1961-1976)
- Yıldırak Daş (1976-1979)
- Kut Sarpyener (1979-1980)
- Coşkun Şarman (1980-1984)*
- Yıldırak Daş (1984-1986)
- Rafet Çaltuğ (1986-1987)
- Ertan Cireli (1987-1991)
- Güneşi Olcay (1991-1995)
- Sezai Bağbaşı (1995-1997)
- Şadi Toker (1997-2000)
- Azmi Kumova (2000-2008)
- Mesut Polat (2008-2009)
- Ayda Uluç (2009-2012)
- Osman Tural (2012-2014[4])
- Cengiz Durmuş (2015[5]-2024)
- Şafak Müderrisgil (2024-)
