= Karin Lušnic =

Slovenian tennis player (born 1971)

- Full name: Karin Lušnic
- Country (sports): Yugoslavia (1989–1991); Slovenia (1991–1996)
- Born: 15 May 1971 (age 53); Ljubljana, SFR Yugoslavia
- Turned pro: 1990
- Retired: 1996
- Prize money: $23,174

Singles
- Career record: 69–52
- Career titles: 1 ITF
- Highest ranking: 228 (23 May 1994)

Doubles
- Career record: 56–36
- Career titles: 4 ITF
- Highest ranking: 222 (21 June 1993)

Other doubles tournaments
- Olympic Games: 1R (1992)

Team competitions
- Fed Cup: 7–4

Karin Lušnic (born 15 May 1971 in Ljubljana) is a former tennis player from Slovenia.

Lušnic won one singles and three doubles titles on the ITF tour in her career. On 4 December 1995, she reached her best singles ranking of world number 416. On 12 September 1994, she peaked at world number 305 in the doubles rankings.

Lušnic has a 7–4 record for Slovenia in Fed Cup competition and represented her country, together with Tina Križan, at the 1992 Summer Olympics in Barcelona in women's doubles.

== ITF finals ==
=== Singles (1–2) ===
Legend $100,000 tournaments $75,000 tournaments $50,000 tournaments $25,000 tournaments $10,000 tournaments	Finals by surface Hard (0–1) Clay (1–1) Grass (0–0) Carpet (0–0)

Result	No.	Date	Tournament	Surface	Opponent	Score
Loss	1.	15 July 1991	Subiaco, Italy	Clay	(Spain) Bárbara Navarro	3–6, 6–3, 2–6
Loss	2.	8 June 1992	Oliveira, Portugal	Hard	(Japan) Emiko Okagawa	2–6, 0–6
Win	1.	21 September 1992	Adriatic, Croatia	Clay	(Austria) Christina Habernigg	6–0, 6–2

=== Doubles (4–5) ===
Legend $100,000 tournaments $75,000 tournaments $50,000 tournaments $25,000 tournaments $10,000 tournaments	Finals by surface Hard (0–1) Clay (4–4) Grass (0–0) Carpet (0–0)

Result	No.	Date	Tournament	Surface	Partner	Opponents	Score
Loss	1.	29 October 1990	Putignano, Italy	Hard	(Socialist Federal Republic of Yugoslavia) Darija Dešković	(Italy) Nathalie Baudone (Italy) Silvia Farina Elia	1–6, 1–6
Win	1.	25 February 1991	Lisbon, Portugal	Clay	(Socialist Federal Republic of Yugoslavia) Darija Dešković	(Switzerland) Christelle Fauche (Czechoslovakia) Monika Kratochvílová	6–4, 6–0
Loss	2.	24 June 1991	Dubrovnik, Yugoslavia	Clay	(Czechoslovakia) Katarína Studeníková	(Czechoslovakia) Dominika Gorecká (Czechoslovakia) Kateřina Sisková	4–6, 4–6
Loss	3.	15 June 1992	Maribor, Slovenia	Clay	(Slovenia) Tina Križan	(Germany) Renata Kochta (Czechoslovakia) Pavlína Rajzlová	6–2, 4–6, 4–6
Win	2.	20 July 1992	Subiaco, Italy	Clay	(Czechoslovakia) Martina Hautová	(France) Nathalie Ballet (Switzerland) Joana Manta	6–1, 2–6, 6–2
Loss	4.	31 August 1992	Massa, Italy	Clay	(Czechoslovakia) Martina Hautová	(Italy) Yasmin Angeli (Italy) Stefania Pifferi	7–6, 5–7, 5–7
Loss	5.	28 September 1992	Mali Lošinj, Croatia	Clay	(Croatia) Darija Dešković	(Croatia) Maja Murić (Croatia) Petra Rihtarić	3–6, 6–4, 4–6
Win	3.	5 April 1993	Athens, Greece	Clay	(Croatia) Darija Dešković	(Netherlands) Sandra van der Aa (Netherlands) Annemarie Mikkers	6–3, 7–6^{(7–5)}
Win	4.	7 June 1993	Caserta, Italy	Clay	(Croatia) Maja Murić	(Chile) Paula Cabezas (Italy) Adriana Serra Zanetti	2–6, 6–2, 6–3
