= Duygu Akşit Oal =

Turkish tennis player

- Full name: İsmet-Duygu Akşit Oal
- Country (sports): Turkey
- Born: 4 October 1971 (age 53); Ankara, Turkey
- Turned pro: 1991
- Retired: 2003
- Plays: Right-handed (two-handed backhand)
- Prize money: $9,868

Singles
- Career record: 30–30
- Career titles: 0
- Highest ranking: No. 580 (9 October 2010)

Doubles
- Career record: 41–27
- Career titles: 4 ITF
- Highest ranking: No. 357 (7 July 1997)

Team competitions
- Fed Cup: 32–28
Medal record
Representing Turkey
Women's Tennis
Mediterranean Games
Bronze medal – third place	1997 Bari	Doubles

İsmet-Duygu Akşit Oal (born 10 October 1971) is a retired Turkish tennis player.

Akşit Oal won four doubles titles on the ITF circuit in her career. On 9 October 2010, she reached her best singles ranking of world number 580. On 7 July 1997, she peaked at number 357 in the WTA doubles rankings.

Playing for Turkey in Fed Cup, she has a win–loss record of 32–28.

Akşit Oal retirement from professional tennis 2003.

== ITF Circuit finals ==
$50,000 tournaments
$25,000 tournaments
$10,000 tournaments

=== Singles (0–1) ===
Result	Date	Location	Surface	Opponent	Score
Loss	13 August 2000	Istanbul, Turkey	Hard	(Russia) Gulnara Fattakhetdinova	0–6, 4–6

=== Doubles (4–2) ===
Result	Date	Location	Surface	Partner	Opponents	Score
Loss	28 August 1995	Istanbul, Turkey	Hard	(Hungary) Zsofia Csapó	(United Kingdom) Helen Crook (United Kingdom) Victoria Davies	4–6, 4–6
Win	7 June 1997	Antalya, Turkey	Hard	(Turkey) Gülberk Gültekin	(Russia) Maria Boboedova (Canada) Aneta Soukup	w/o
Loss	15 August 1998	Istanbul, Turkey	Hard	(Turkey) Gülberk Gültekin	(Israel) Nataly Cahana (Greece) Eleni Daniilidou	6–3, 3–6, 3–6
Win	3 July 1999	Istanbul, Turkey	Hard	(Turkey) Gülberk Gültekin	(Russia) Gulnara Fattakhetdinova (Russia) Ekaterina Paniouchkina	3–6, 6–2, 6–3
Win	3 February 2001	Istanbul, Turkey	Hard (i)	(Belarus) Elena Yaryshka	(Russia) Maria Kondratieva (Russia) Svetlana Mossiakova	6–1, 6–1
Win	12 May 2001	Mersin, Turkey	Clay	(Belarus) Elena Yaryshka	(Portugal) Angela Cardoso (Portugal) Ana Catarina Nogueira	6–1, 6–4
