= Ukraine Billie Jean King Cup team =

Ukrainian women's tennis team

Ukraine
- Captain: Illya Marchenko
- Nations Ranking: 3 ▲ (13 April 2026)
- Colors: yellow & blue
- First year: 1993
- Years played: 32
- Ties played (W–L): 105 (61–44)
- Years in World Group: 8 (4–4)
- Best finish: Finals (2026)
- Most total wins: Elena Tatarkova (27–11)
- Most singles wins: Elina Svitolina (18–10)
- Most doubles wins: Olga Savchuk (18–6)
- Best doubles team: Kateryna Bondarenko / Olga Savchuk (6–1)
- Most ties played: Elena Tatarkova (27)
- Most years played: Olga Savchuk (12)

The Ukraine Billie Jean King Cup team represents Ukraine in the Billie Jean King Cup tennis competition and are governed by the Ukrainian Tennis Federation. They currently compete in the 2026 Billie Jean King Cup finals (the highest level of the competition).

== History ==
Ukraine competed in its first Fed Cup in 1993. Their best result is reaching the final in 2026.

== Current team ==
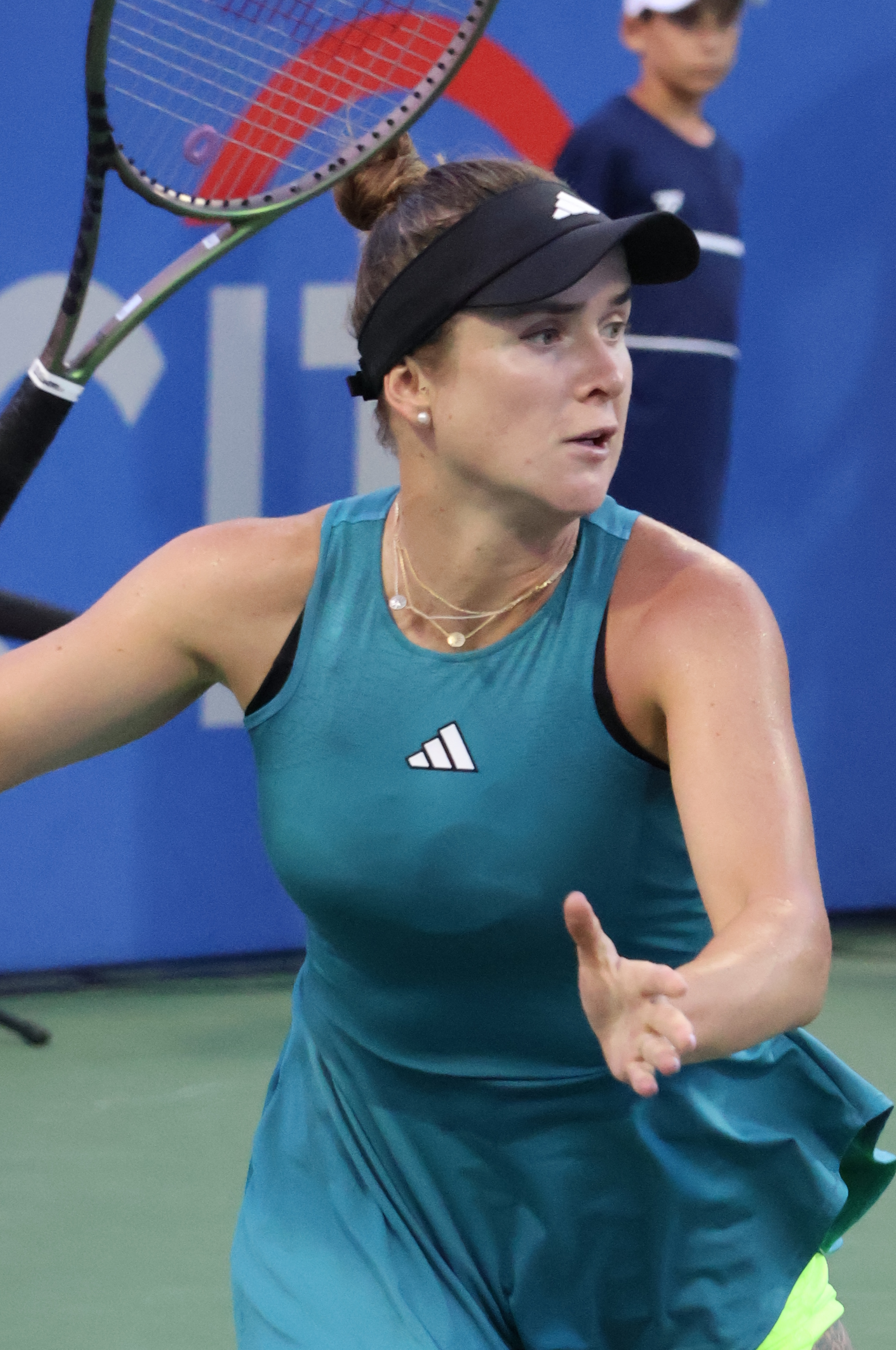
Elina Svitolina

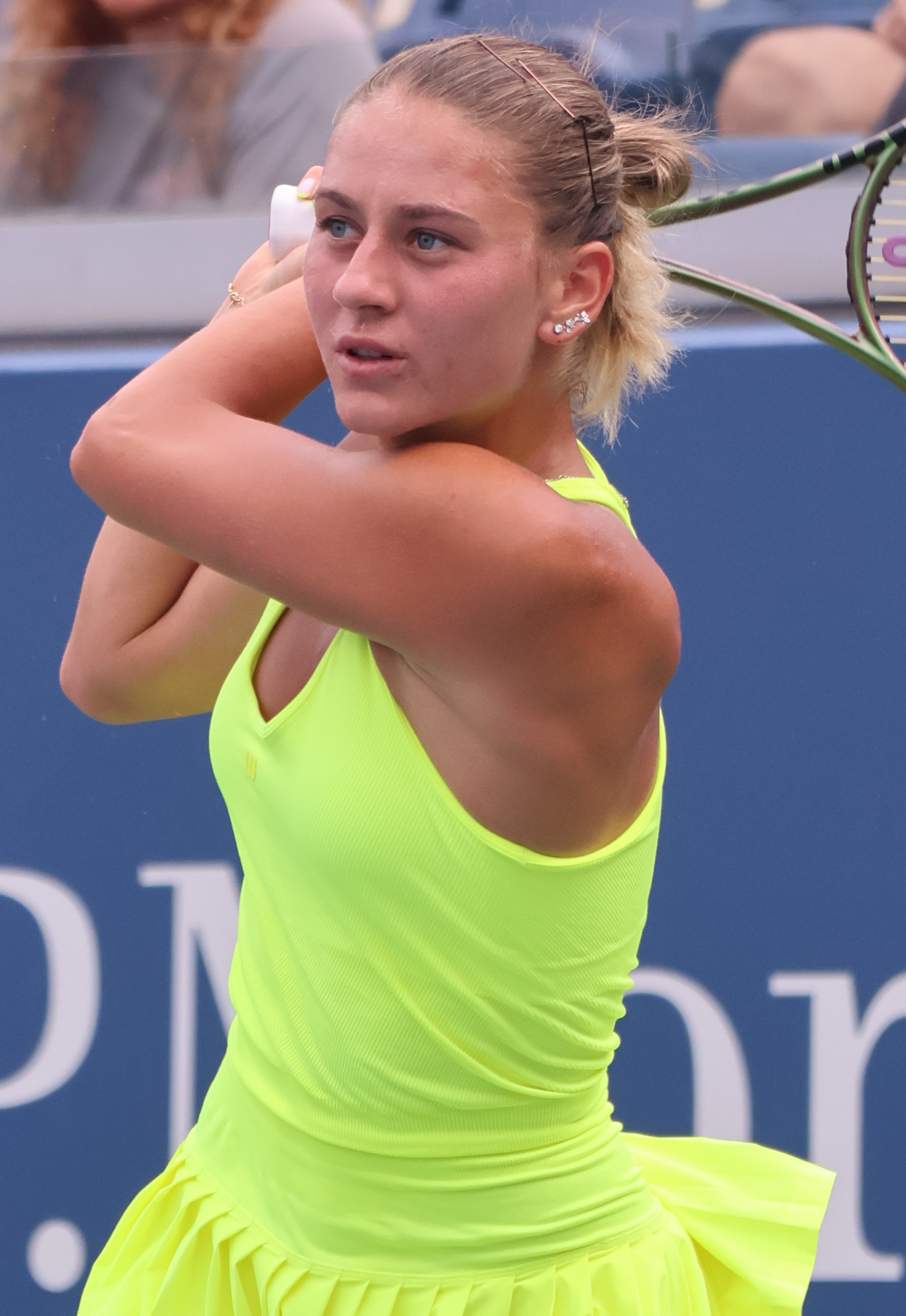
Marta Kostyuk

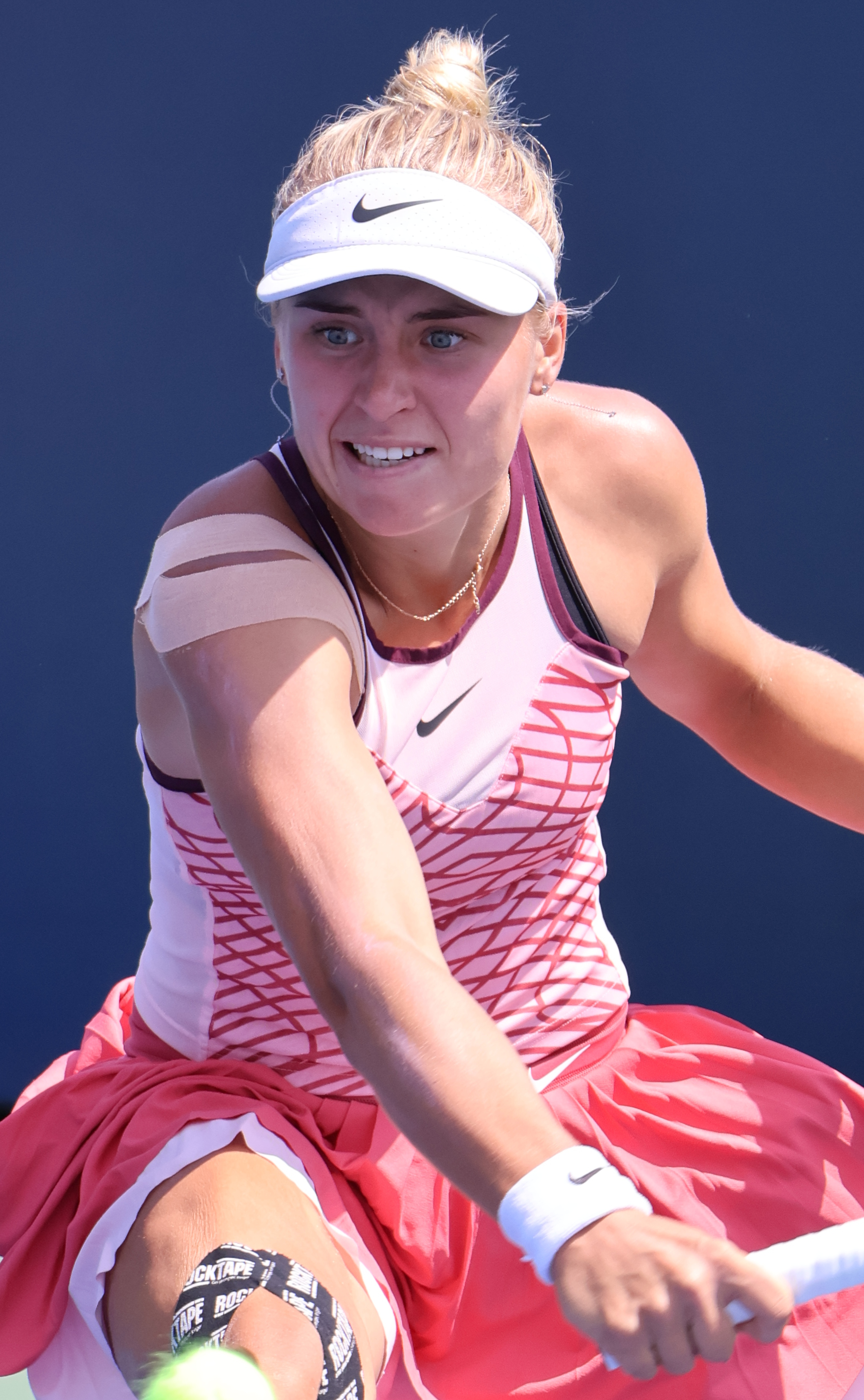
Yuliia Starodubtseva

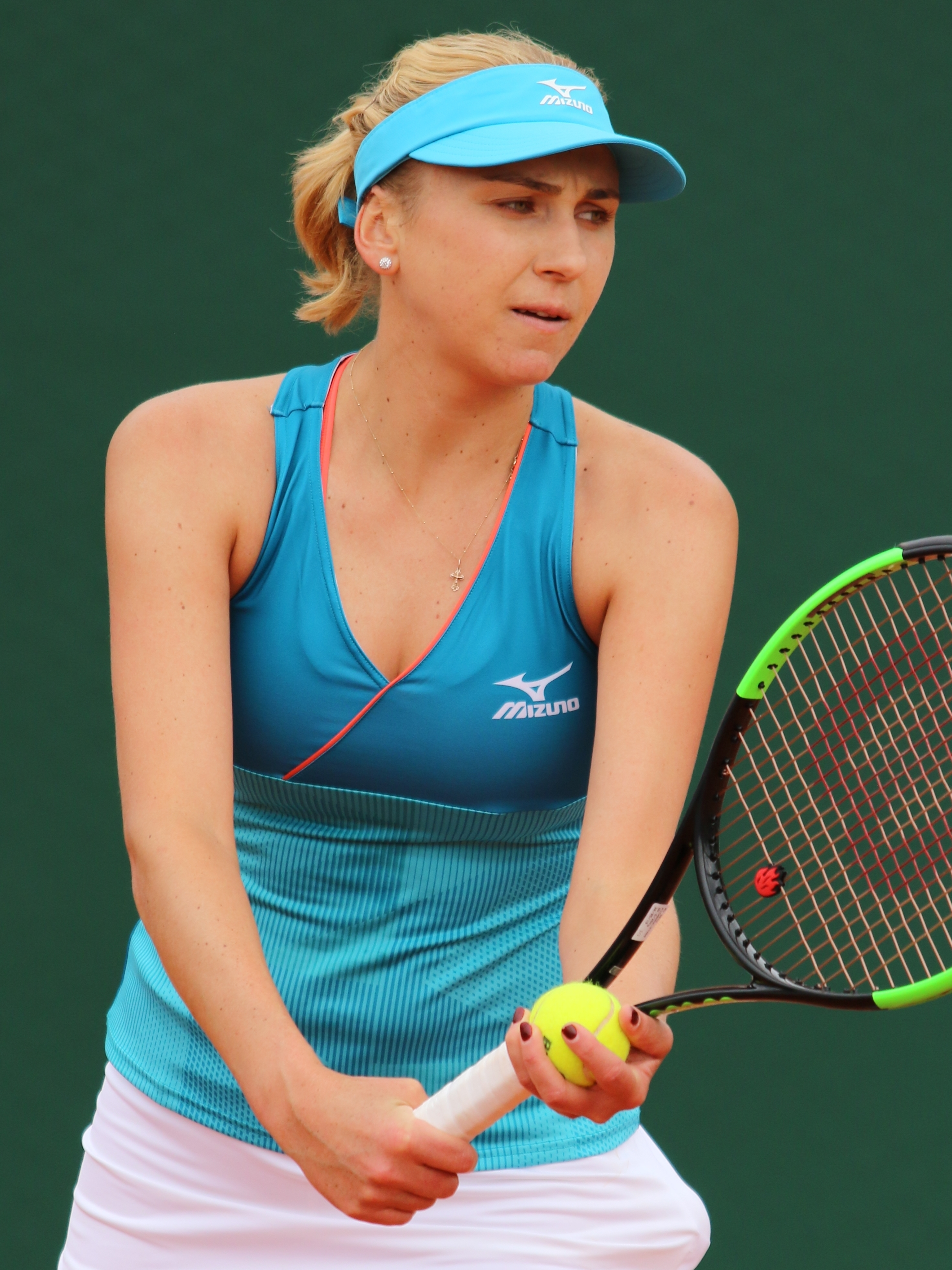
Lyudmyla Kichenok

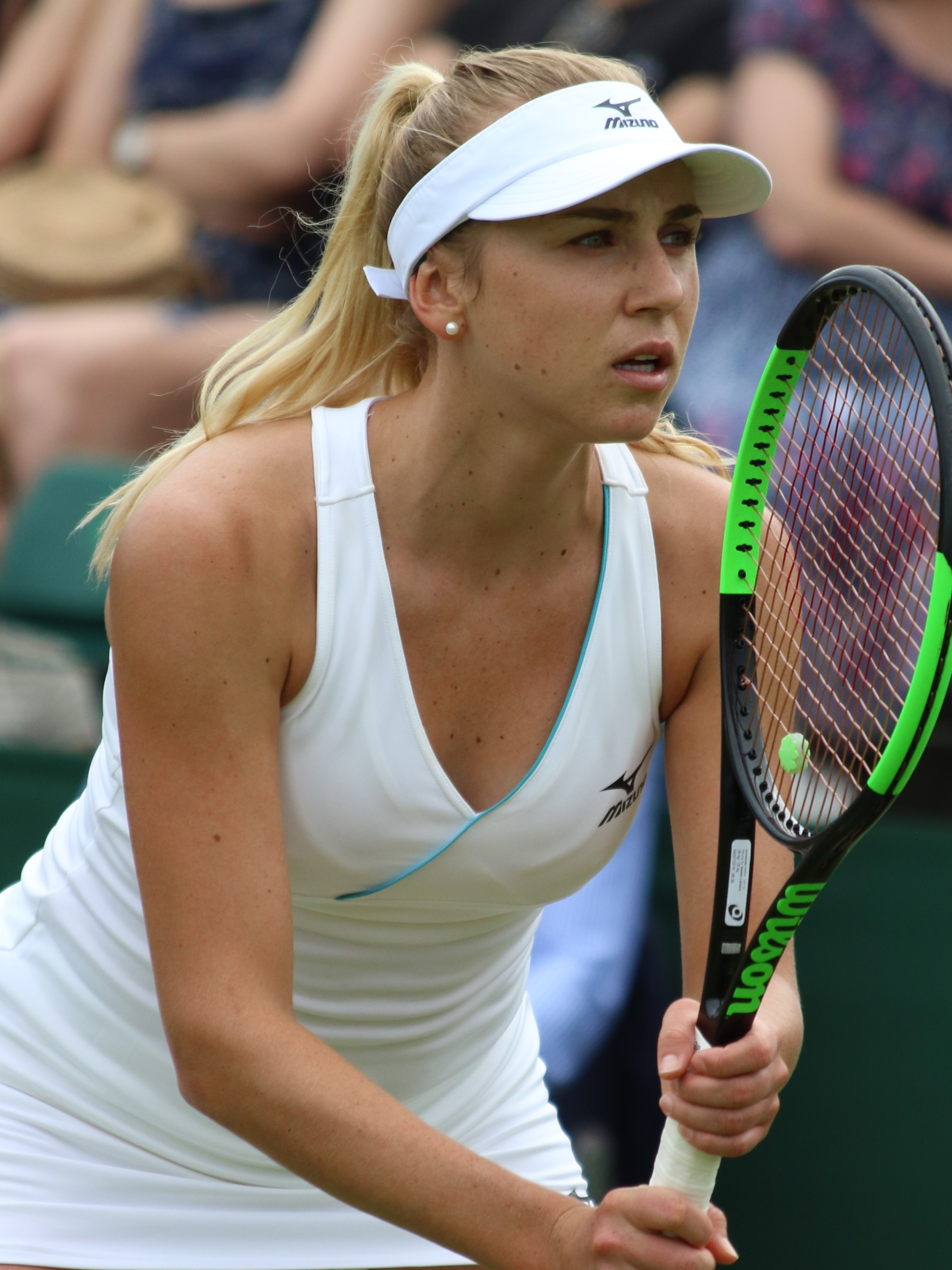
Nadiia Kichenok

Name	Age	First year	Ties	Win–loss overall			Rankings	
Name	Age	First year	Ties	Singles	Doubles	Total	Singles	Doubles
Elina Svitolina	31	2012	20	68–40	0–4	68–44	13	—
Marta Kostyuk	23	2018	12	38–16	6–4	44–20	26	79
Yuliia Starodubtseva	25	2025	2	0–0	0–0	0–0	87	410
Lyudmyla Kichenok	33	2010	11	14–20	10–12	24–32	—	32
Nadiia Kichenok	33	2010	15	22–16	14–12	36–28	—	55

== Team matches ==
Won the whole tournament.
Played in the World Group/Finals.

Result	Tiers	Year	Date	Group	Round	Opponent	Host	Surface	Score
Loss	0–1	1993	May 10	WG QR	RR	Russia	GBR	Hard	0–3
Loss	0–2	1993	May 11	WG QR	RR	Luxembourg	GBR	Hard	1–2
Loss	0–3	1993	May 13	WG QR	RR	Great Britain	GBR	Hard	0–3
Win	1–3	1993	May 14	WG QR	RR	Lithuania	GBR	Hard	3–0
Win	2–3	1994	Apr 19	WG QR	RR	Tunisia	AUT	Clay	3–0
Loss	2–4	1994	Apr 21	WG QR	RR	Georgia	AUT	Clay	1–2
Win	3–4	1994	Apr 22	WG QR	PO - SF	Slovenia	AUT	Clay	2–1
Loss	3–5	1994	Apr 23	WG QR	PO - F	Austria	AUT	Clay	0–3
Loss	3–6	1995	Apr 17	Z1	RR	Russia	ESP	Clay	1–2
Win	4–6	1995	Apr 18	Z1	RR	Georgia	ESP	Clay	2–1
Loss	4–7	1995	Apr 19	Z1	RR	Hungary	ESP	Clay	0–3
Win	5–7	1996	Mar 26	Z2	RR	Ireland	ISR	Hard	2–1
Win	6–7	1996	Mar 27	Z2	RR	Denmark	ISR	Hard	3–0
Win	7–7	1996	Mar 28	Z2	RR	Iceland	ISR	Hard	3–0
Win	8–7	1996	Mar 29	Z2	RR	Malta	ISR	Hard	3–0
Win	9–7	1996	Mar 30	Z2	PO	Turkey	ISR	Hard	3–0
Loss	9–8	1997	Apr 22	Z1	RR	Sweden	ITA	Clay	1–2
Loss	9–9	1997	Apr 23	Z1	RR	Italy	ITA	Clay	0–3
Loss	9–10	1997	Apr 24	Z1	RR	Romania	ITA	Clay	0–3
Win	10–10	1998	Apr 14	Z1	RR	Yugoslavia	ESP	Clay	3–0
Win	11–10	1998	Apr 15	Z1	RR	Hungary	ESP	Clay	3–0
Loss	11–11	1998	Apr 16	Z1	RR	Sweden	ESP	Clay	1–2
Loss	11–12	1998	Apr 17	Z1	PO - SF	Belarus	ESP	Clay	1–2
Win	12–12	1999	Apr 19	Z1	RR	Latvia	ESP	Clay	2–1
Win	13–12	1999	Apr 20	Z1	RR	Denmark	ESP	Clay	2–1
Loss	13–13	1999	Apr 21	Z1	RR	South Africa	ESP	Clay	0–3
Loss	13–14	1999	Apr 22	Z1	PO - SF	Romania	ESP	Clay	0–2
Loss	13–15	2000	May 15	Z1	RR	Great Britain	ESP	Clay	1–2
Win	14–15	2000	May 17	Z1	RR	Israel	ESP	Clay	2–1
Loss	14–16	2000	May 18	Z1	RR	Luxembourg	ESP	Clay	1–2
Win	15–16	2000	May 19	Z1	RR	Finland	ESP	Clay	3–0
Win	16–16	2001	May 24	Z1	RR	South Africa	ESP	Clay	2–1
Loss	16–17	2001	May 25	Z1	RR	Slovenia	ESP	Clay	1–2
Win	17–17	2001	May 26	Z1	RR	Estonia	ESP	Clay	2–1
Loss	17–18	2002	Apr 24	Z1	RR	Slovenia	TUR	Clay	0–3
Loss	17–19	2002	Apr 25	Z1	RR	Belarus	TUR	Clay	1–2
Win	18–19	2002	Apr 26	Z1	RR	Greece	TUR	Clay	3–0
Win	19–19	2002	Apr 27	Z1	PO	Bulgaria	TUR	Clay	2–1
Loss	19–20	2002	Jul 20–21	WG PO	—	Slovenia	SLO	Clay	1–4
Loss	19–21	2003	Apr 22–23	Z1	RR	Denmark	POR	Clay	1–2
Win	20–21	2003	Apr 24	Z1	RR	Romania	POR	Clay	2–1
Win	21–21	2003	Apr 25	Z1	RR	South Africa	POR	Clay	2–1
Loss	21–22	2003	Apr 26	Z1	PO	Hungary	POR	Clay	1–2
Win	22–22	2004	Apr 20	Z1	RR	South Africa	GRE	Clay	2–1
Win	23–22	2004	Apr 21	Z1	RR	Netherlands	GRE	Clay	2–1
Win	24–22	2004	Apr 23	Z1	RR	Israel	GRE	Clay	3–0
Win	25–22	2004	Apr 24	Z1	PO	Hungary	GRE	Clay	2–0
Loss	25–23	2004	Jul 10–11	WG PO	—	Germany	UKR	Clay	2–3
Win	26–23	2005	Apr 20	Z1	RR	Greece	TUR	Clay	3–0
Loss	26–24	2005	Apr 21	Z1	RR	Belarus	TUR	Clay	1–2
Loss	26–25	2005	Apr 22	Z1	RR	Israel	TUR	Clay	0–3
Win	27–25	2005	Apr 23	Z1	PO	Great Britain	TUR	Clay	2–1
Loss	27–26	2006	Apr 18	Z1	RR	Great Britain	BUL	Clay	0–3
Win	28–26	2006	Apr 19	Z1	RR	Hungary	BUL	Clay	2–1
Loss	28–27	2006	Apr 20	Z1	RR	Bulgaria	BUL	Clay	1–2
Win	29–27	2006	Apr 22	Z1	PO	Finland	BUL	Clay	2–0
Win	30–27	2007	Apr 18	Z1	RR	Lithuania	BUL	Clay	3–0
Win	31–27	2007	Apr 19	Z1	RR	Hungary	BUL	Clay	2–1
Win	32–27	2007	Apr 20	Z1	RR	Belarus	BUL	Clay	3–0
Win	33–27	2007	Apr 21	Z1	PO	Poland	BUL	Clay	2–1
Win	34–27	2007	Jul 14–15	WG2 PO	—	Australia	AUS	Hard	4–1
Win	35–27	2008	Feb 2–3	WG2	—	Belgium	UKR	Clay (i)	3–2
Loss	35–28	2008	Apr 26–27	WG PO	—	Italy	ITA	Clay	2–3
Win	36–28	2009	Feb 7–8	WG2	—	Israel	UKR	Hard (i)	3–2
Win	37–28	2009	Apr 25–26	WG PO	—	Argentina	ARG	Clay	5–0
Loss	37–29	2010 (1)	Feb 6–7	WG	QF	Italy	UKR	Hard (i)	1–4
Loss	37–30	2010 (1)	Apr 24–25	WG PO	—	Australia	UKR	Clay (i)	0–5
Win	38–30	2011	Feb 5–6	WG2	—	Sweden	SWE	Hard (i)	3–2
Win	39–30	2011	Feb 16–17	WG PO	—	Australia	AUS	Clay	3–2
Loss	39–31	2012 (2)	Feb 4–5	WG	QF	Italy	ITA	Clay (i)	2–3
Loss	39–32	2012 (2)	Apr 21–22	WG PO	—	United States	UKR	Clay	0–5
Loss	39–33	2013	Feb 9–10	WG2	—	Spain	ESP	Clay	1–3
Loss	39–34	2013	Apr 20–21	WG2 PO	—	Canada	UKR	Clay (i)	2–3
Win	40–34	2014	Feb 5	Z1	RR	Israel	HUN	Hard (i)	3–0
Win	41–34	2014	Feb 6	Z1	RR	Slovenia	HUN	Hard (i)	3–0
Win	42–34	2014	Feb 8	Z1	RR	Austria	HUN	Hard (i)	2–1
Loss	42–35	2014	Feb 9	Z1	PO	Romania	HUN	Hard (i)	0–2
Win	43–35	2015	Feb 4	Z1	RR	Turkey	HUN	Hard (i)	2–1
Win	44–35	2015	Feb 5	Z1	RR	Liechtenstein	HUN	Hard (i)	3–0
Loss	44–36	2015	Feb 6	Z1	RR	Great Britain	HUN	Hard (i)	0–3
Win	45–36	2015	Feb 7	Z1	PO	Bulgaria	HUN	Hard (i)	2–0
Win	46–36	2016	Feb 3	Z1	RR	Portugal	ISR	Hard	3–0
Win	47–36	2016	Feb 5	Z1	RR	Sweden	ISR	Hard	3–0
Win	48–36	2016	Feb 6	Z1	PO	Israel	ISR	Hard	3–0
Win	49–36	2016	Apr 16–17	WG2 PO	—	Argentina	UKR	Hard	4–0
Win	50–36	2017	Feb 11–12	WG2	—	Australia	UKR	Hard (i)	3–1
Loss	50–37	2017	Apr 22–23	WG PO	—	Germany	GER	Clay (i)	2–3
Loss	50–38	2018	Feb 10–11	WG2	—	Australia	AUS	Grass	2–3
Loss	50–39	2018	Apr 21–22	WG2 PO	—	Canada	CAN	Hard (i)	2–3
Loss	50–40	2019	Feb 6	Z1	RR	Sweden	POL	Hard (i)	1–2
Win	51–40	2019	Feb 7	Z1	RR	Bulgaria	POL	Hard (i)	2–1
Win	52–40	2019	Feb 8	Z1	RR	Estonia	POL	Hard (i)	3–0
Loss	52–41	2019	Feb 9	Z1	PO	Poland	POL	Hard (i)	1–2
Win	53–41	2020–21	Feb 6, 2020	Z1	RR	Bulgaria	EST	Hard (i)	3–0
Win	54–41	2020–21	Feb 7, 2020	Z1	RR	Croatia	EST	Hard (i)	3–0
Win	55–41	2020–21	Feb 8. 2020	Z1	PO	Estonia	EST	Hard (i)	2–1
Win	56–41	2020–21	Apr 16–17, 2021	Finals PO	—	Japan	UKR	Clay	4–0
Loss	56–42	2022	Apr 15–16	Finals QR	—	United States	USA	Hard (i)	2–3
Win	57–42	2022	Nov 11–12	Finals PO	—	Japan	JPN	Hard (i)	3–1
Loss	57–43	2023	Apr 14–15	Finals QR	—	Czech Republic	TUR	Clay	1–3
Win	58–43	2023	Nov 11–12	Finals PO	—	Netherlands	LTU (Note: The competition was originally scheduled to take place in Ukraine, but due to the Russian war against Ukraine, it was relocated to Lithuania.)	Hard (i)	3–1
Loss	58–44	2024	Apr 12–13	Finals QR	—	Romania	USA (Note: The competition was originally scheduled to take place in Ukraine, but due to the Russian war against Ukraine, it was relocated to the United States.)	Clay (green)	2–3
Win	59–44	2024	Nov 16–17	Finals PO	—	Austria	USA	Hard (i)	3–2
Win	60–44	2025 (3)	Apr 11	Finals QR	RR	Poland	POL	Clay (i)	3–2
Win	61–44	2025 (3)	Apr 12	Finals QR	RR	Switzerland	POL	Clay (i)	2–1
Win	62–44	2025 (3)	Sep 17	Finals	QF	Spain	CHN	Hard (i)	2–0
Loss	62–45	2025 (3)	Sep 19	Finals	SF	Italy	CHN	Hard (i)	1–2
Win	63–45	2026 (4)	Apr 10–11	Finals QR	RR	Poland	POL	Clay (i)	0–4
Win	64–45	2026 (4)	Sep 24	Finals	QF	Belgium	CHN	Hard (i)	2–1
Win	65–45	2026 (4)	Sep 26	Finals	SF	Italy	CHN	Hard (i)	2–0
Loss	65–46	2026 (4)	Sep 27	Finals	F	Czech Republic	CHN	Hard (i)	0–2

== Player win–loss record ==
Player	Total Win–loss	Singles Win–loss	Doubles Win–loss	No. of ties	First year played	Years played
Olena Antypina	4-3	2-2	2-1	4	2006	1
Talina Beiko	2-4	1-2	1-2	3	1995	1
Gabriela Beleni	2-2	1-1	1-1	2	1993	1
Yuliya Beygelzimer	17-12	9-7	8-5	19	2000	6
Natalia Biletskaia	2-5	1-2	1-3	4	1993	1
Alona Bondarenko	22-12	15-9	7-3	19	2002	6
Kateryna Bondarenko	23-11	11-10	12-1	19	2005	10
Valeria Bondarenko	4-8	0-5	4-3	7	2005	2
Elena Brioukhovets	7-2	3-1	4-1	6	1994	2
Yuliana Fedak	5-3	5-2	0-1	6	2004	2
Elena Jirnova	0-1	0-0	0-1	1	1997	1
Lyudmyla Kichenok	5-5	1-2	4-3	7	2010	5
Nadiia Kichenok	6-6	2-1	4-5	12	2010	7
Mariya Koryttseva	5-3	1-1	4-2	7	2004	4
Marta Kostyuk	7-3	4-1	3-2	8	2018	3
Tatiana Kovalchuk	7-6	4-3	3-3	11	1996	4
Kateryna Kozlova	4-3	3-2	1-1	5	2015	2
Viktoriya Kutuzova	0-1	0-0	0-1	1	2010	1
Olga Lugina	3-9	2-4	1-5	7	1993	3
Natalia Medvedeva	7-8	2-4	5-4	11	1994	3
Yulia Mirna	0-2	0-0	0-2	2	1999	1
Natalia Nemchinova	0-5	0-3	0-2	3	1997	1
Tatiana Perebiynis	10-12	4-9	6-3	12	1999	6
Anastasia Ponomarenko	0-1	0-0	0-1	1	1997	1
Olga Savchuk	21-8	3-2	18-6	28	2004	12
Elina Svitolina	14-10	14-8	0-2	17	2012	6
Elena Tatarkova	27-11	17-7	10-4	27	1994	8
Olga Teplinskaia	1-0	0-0	1-0	1	1998	1
Lesia Tsurenko	15-15	11-13	4-2	18	2011	9
Anastasiya Vasylyeva	1-0	0-0	1-0	1	2016	1
Dayana Yastremska	6-0	5-0	1-0	5	2019	2
Anna Zaporozhanova	8-4	5-2	3-2	8	1996	3
Katarina Zavatska	2-0	0-0	2-0	2	2020	1

== See also ==
- Billie Jean King Cup
- Ukraine Davis Cup team
- Ukraine at the Hopman Cup
