= Gülberk Gültekin =

Turkish tennis player (born 1974)

- Country (sports): Turkey
- Born: 4 April 1974 (age 50); Trabzon, Turkey
- Turned pro: 1993
- Retired: 2005
- Plays: Right-handed (Double-handed backhand)
- Prize money: $18,786

Singles
- Career record: 63–58
- Career titles: 2 ITF
- Highest ranking: No. 391 (11 September 1995)

Doubles
- Career record: 44 - 41
- Career titles: 3 ITF
- Highest ranking: No. 451 (21 August 1995)

Team competitions
- Fed Cup: 24–28
Medal record
Women's Tennis
Representing Turkey
Mediterranean Games
Bronze medal – third place	1997 Bari	Doubles

Gülberk Gültekin (born 4 April 1974) is a Turkish former professional female tennis player.

Gültekin has won 2 singles and 3 doubles titles on the ITF circuit in her career. On 11 September 1995, she reached her best singles ranking of world number 391. On 21 August 1995, she peaked at world number 451 in the doubles rankings.

Playing for Turkey at the Fed Cup, Gültekin has a win–loss record of 24–28.

Gültekin retired from tennis in 2005.

== ITF Circuit finals ==
$100,000 tournaments
$75,000 tournaments
$50,000 tournaments
$25,000 tournaments
$10,000 tournaments

=== Singles: 4 (2–2) ===
Result	Date	Category	Tournament	Surface	Opponent	Score
Loss	26 July 1993	10,000	Istanbul, Turkey	Clay	(United Kingdom) Karen Cross	6–4, 5–7, 6–7^{(4–7)}
Win	7 August 1995	10,000	Istanbul, Turkey	Hard	(Romania) Raluca Sandu	6–3, 6–1
Win	28 August 1995	10,000	Istanbul, Turkey	Hard	(Germany) Katrin Ittensohn	7–6^{(7–3)}, 6–3
Loss	2 June 1997	10,000	Antalya, Turkey	Hard	(Israel) Tzipora Obziler	0–6, 4–6

=== Doubles: 7 (3-4) ===
Result	Date	Category	Tournament	Surface	Partner	Opponents	Score
Loss	26 June 1995	10,000	Mexico City, Mexico	Hard	(United States) Mindy Weiner	(Mexico) Melody Falcó (Dominican Republic) Joelle Schad	3–6, 3–6
Win	7 August 1995	10,000	Istanbul, Turkey	Hard	(United States) Selin Nassi Tekikbas	(Romania) Alice Pirsu (Romania) Raluca Sandu	6–2, 6–2
Win	2 June 1997	10,000	Antalya, Turkey	Hard	(Turkey) Duygu Akşit Oal	(Russia) Maria Boboedova (Canada) Aneta Soukup	W/O
Loss	20 October 1997	10,000	Puerto Vallarta, Mexico	Hard	(Nigeria) Clara Udofa	(United States) Erica Adams (United States) Katie Schlukebir	3–6, 4–6
Loss	10 August 1998	10,000	Istanbul, Turkey	Hard	(Turkey) Duygu Akşit Oal	(Israel) Nataly Cahana (Greece) Eleni Daniilidou	6–3, 3–6, 3–6
Loss	2 November 1998	10,000	Rungsted, Denmark	Hard (i)	(Germany) Karina Karner	(Denmark) Charlotte Aagaard (Denmark) Maiken Pape	4–6, 2–6
Win	21 June 1999	10,000	Istanbul, Turkey	Hard	(Turkey) Duygu Akşit Oal	(Russia) Gulnara Fattakhetdinova (Russia) Ekaterina Paniouchkina	3–6, 6–2, 6–3
