= 1993 Federation Cup (tennis) =

International women's tennis competition

Details
- Duration: 19 April – 25 July
- Edition: 31st

Champion
- Winning nation: Spain

The 1993 Federation Cup was the 31st edition of the most important competition between national teams in women's tennis. Spain defeated Australia in the final, giving Spain their 2nd title. This was Australia's first final since 1984.

== Qualifying rounds ==
- Nations in **bold** qualified for the World Group.

=== Americas Zone ===
Venue: Palmas del Mar, Humacao, Puerto Rico (outdoor hard)

Dates: April 19–24

Participating teams

- Bahamas
- Barbados
- Bolivia
- **Chile**
- **Colombia**
- Costa Rica
- Dominican Republic
- Ecuador
- El Salvador
- Guatemala
- Jamaica
- Mexico
- Paraguay
- **Peru**
- Puerto Rico
- Trinidad and Tobago
- **Uruguay**
- Venezuela

=== Asia/Oceania Zone ===
Venue: National Tennis Centre, Colombo, Sri Lanka (outdoor clay)

Dates: May 4–5

Participating teams

- **China**
- Chinese Taipei
- **Indonesia**
- Lebanon
- **New Zealand**
- Philippines
- Singapore
- Sri Lanka
- Thailand

=== Europe/Africa Zone ===
Venue: City of Nottingham Tennis Centre, Nottingham, England (outdoor hard)

Dates: May 10–15

Participating teams

- **Belgium**
- **Croatia**
- Estonia
- **Great Britain**
- Greece
- Hungary
- Ireland
- **Israel**
- **Latvia**
- Lithuania
- Luxembourg
- Malta
- Norway
- Portugal
- Romania
- Russia
- Senegal
- Slovenia
- Tunisia
- Turkey
- Ukraine
- Zimbabwe

== World Group ==
Venue: Waldstadion T.C., Frankfurt, Germany (outdoor clay)

Dates: July 19–25

Participating teams
Argentina	Australia	Austria	Belgium	Bulgaria	Canada	Chile	China
Colombia	Croatia	Czech Republic	Denmark	Finland	France	Germany	Great Britain
Indonesia	Israel	Italy	Japan	Latvia	Netherlands	New Zealand	Peru
Poland	South Africa	South Korea	Spain	Sweden	Switzerland	United States	Uruguay

=== Draw ===
First Round; 19–20 July
Germany	1
Australia	2
Austria	1
Denmark	2
Q	Chile	0
Finland	3
Q	Colombia	0
Japan	3
Argentina	3
Q	New Zealand	0
South Korea	1
Bulgaria	2
Q	China	2
Q	Peru	1
Switzerland	0
United States	3
Czech Republic	2
South Africa	1
Italy	3
Q	Israel	0
Sweden	3
Q	Uruguay	0
Canada	1
France	2
Netherlands	3
Q	Croatia	0
Q	Latvia	2
Q	Belgium	1
Poland	1
Q	Indonesia	2
Q	Great Britain	0
Spain	3

Second Round; 21 July
Australia	3
Denmark	0
Finland	2
Japan	1
Argentina	2
Bulgaria	1
Q	China	1
United States	2
Czech Republic	2
Italy	1
Sweden	0
France	3
Netherlands	3
Q	Latvia	0
Q	Indonesia	0
Spain	3

Quarterfinals; 22–23 July
Australia	3
Finland	0
Argentina	2
United States	1
Czech Republic	0
France	3
Netherlands	0
Spain	3

Semifinals; 24 July
Australia	2
Argentina	1
France	1
Spain	2

Final; 25 July
Australia	0
Spain	3

== World Group play-offs ==
Venue: Waldstadion T.C., Frankfurt, Germany (outdoor clay)

Dates: July 22

The sixteen teams that lost in the World Group first round ties played off in eight randomly drawn ties. The winners remained in the World Group, while the losers were relegated to Zonal Competition in 1994.

Winning team	Score	Losing team
Canada	3–0	Uruguay
South Korea	3–0	New Zealand
South Africa	2–1	Israel
Germany	2–1	Austria
Colombia	2–1	Chile
Croatia	2–1	Belgium
Poland	2–1	Great Britain
Switzerland	2–1	Peru
