= Turkey Billie Jean King Cup team =

Turkish national women's tennis team

Turkey
- Captain: Alaaddin Karagöz
- Nations Ranking: 31 ▼2 (16 November 2015)
- Colors: red & white
- First year: 1991
- Years played: 25
- Ties played (W–L): 91 (50–40)
- Best finish: Zonal Group I RR
- Most total wins: Pemra Özgen (36–35)
- Most singles wins: Çağla Büyükakçay (19–11)
- Most doubles wins: Pemra Özgen (21–12)
- Best doubles team: Duygu Akşit Oal / Gülberk Gültekin (10–5)
- Most ties played: Pemra Özgen (47)
- Most years played: Pemra Özgen (15)

The Turkey Billie Jean King Cup team represents Turkey in the Billie Jean King Cup tennis competition and are governed by the Turkish Tennis Federation. They currently compete in the Europe/Africa Zone of Group III.

== History ==
Turkey competed in its first Fed Cup in 1991. Their best result was reaching the final qualifying round in 1993.

== Players ==
Name	Years	First	Ties	Win/Loss		
Name	Years	First	Ties	Singles	Doubles	Total
Duygu Akşit Oal	11	1991	36	15–19	17–9	32–28
Ayla Aksu	3	2017	7	0–2	2–4	2–6
Merve Asımgil	3	1999	8	3–3	2–2	5–5
Esra Bayburt	4	1991	7	1–3	1–3	2–6
Çağla Büyükakçay	16	2004	48	26–16	13–14	39–30
Berfu Cengiz	2	2019	4	2–1	1–1	3–2
Çiğdem Duru	1	2004	4	1–3	1–1	2–4
Başak Eraydın	5	2013	11	3–4	2–3	5–7
Gülberk Gültekin	8	1991	30	12–17	12–11	24–28
Yasemin Kaya	3	1991	4	1–0	2–1	3–1
Serra Olgaç	1	1998	1	1–0	1–0	2–0
İpek Öz	2	2019	4	0–0	1–2	1–2
Pemra Özgen	20	2001	56	18–26	21–16	39–42
Seden Özlü	4	1996	7	2–0	3–4	5–4
Stela Penciu	3	1994	8	3–4	3–3	6–7
İpek Şenoğlu	9	1996	29	9–8	13–10	22–18
Melis Sezer	4	2009	8	0–1	3–3	3–4
İpek Soylu	7	2012	20	9–3	4–7	13–10

== See also ==
- Billie Jean King Cup
- Turkey Davis Cup team
