= 2019 Zagreb Ladies Open – Doubles =

Doubles
- 2019 Zagreb Ladies Open

Final
- Champions: (Hungary) Anna Bondár (Argentina) Paula Ormaechea
- Runners-up: (France) Amandine Hesse (Chile) Daniela Seguel
- Score: 7–5, 7–5

Events
Singles	Doubles
← 2018 ·	Zagreb Ladies Open	· 2020 →

Andrea Gámiz and Aymet Uzcátegui were the defending champions, but chose not to participate.

Anna Bondár and Paula Ormaechea won the title, defeating Amandine Hesse and Daniela Seguel in the final, 7–5, 7–5.

== Seeds ==
1. (Romania) Elena Bogdan / (Hungary) Réka Luca Jani (quarterfinals)
2. (France) Estelle Cascino / (United Kingdom) Sarah Beth Grey (semifinals)
3. (Russia) Alena Fomina / (Russia) Valentina Ivakhnenko (semifinals)
4. (Romania) Irina Bara / (Turkey) Başak Eraydın (first round)

== Draw ==
=== Key ===
- Q = Qualifier
- WC = Wild card
- LL = Lucky loser
- Alt = Alternate
- SE = Special exempt
- PR = Protected ranking
- ITF = ITF entry
- JE = Junior exempt
- w/o = Walkover
- r = Retired
- d = Defaulted
- SR = Special ranking

=== Draw ===
First round
(Turkey) P Özgen (Greece) D Papamichail
(France) A Hesse (Chile) D Seguel	w/o
3	(Russia) A Fomina (Russia) V Ivakhnenko	7^{7}	6
(Germany) T Morderger (Germany) Y Morderger	6^{5}	2
(Slovenia) P Brglez (Austria) K Peckl	3	3
(Ukraine) M Chernyshova (Bulgaria) D Evtimova	6	6
(Hungary) Á Bukta (Hungary) P Udvardy	2	5
(Croatia) L Mašić (Croatia) I Zelić	6	7
(Hungary) A Bondár (Argentina) P Ormaechea	2	6	[11]
4	(Romania) I Bara (Turkey) B Eraydın	6	3	[9]
(Croatia) T Lukas (Croatia) S Njirić	6	6
(Croatia) A Rajković (Croatia) A Špoljarić	4	2

Quarterfinals
1	(Romania) E Bogdan (Hungary) RL Jani	2	6	[8]
(France) A Hesse (Chile) D Seguel	6	4	[10]
3	(Russia) A Fomina (Russia) V Ivakhnenko	6	6
(Ukraine) M Chernyshova (Bulgaria) D Evtimova	4	3
(Croatia) L Mašić (Croatia) I Zelić
(Hungary) A Bondár (Argentina) P Ormaechea	w/o
(Croatia) T Lukas (Croatia) S Njirić	6	3	[6]
2	(France) E Cascino (United Kingdom) SB Grey	3	6	[10]

Semifinals
(France) A Hesse (Chile) D Seguel	6	6^{5}	[10]
3	(Russia) A Fomina (Russia) V Ivakhnenko	4	7^{7}	[7]
(Hungary) A Bondár (Argentina) P Ormaechea	6	6
2	(France) E Cascino (United Kingdom) SB Grey	2	1

Final
(France) A Hesse (Chile) D Seguel	5	5
(Hungary) A Bondár (Argentina) P Ormaechea	7	7
