= 2011 Zagreb Ladies Open =

- Date: 12–18 September
- Edition: 7th
- Location: Zagreb, Croatia

Champions

Singles
- (Bulgaria) Dia Evtimova

Doubles
- (Portugal) Maria João Koehler / (Hungary) Katalin Marosi
| ← 2010 · | Zagreb Ladies Open | · 2018 → |

The 2011 Zagreb Ladies Open was a professional tennis tournament played on clay courts. It was the seventh edition of the tournament which was part of the 2011 ITF Women's Circuit. It took place in Zagreb, Croatia from 12 and 18 September 2011.

== WTA entrants ==
=== Seeds ===
| Country | Player | Rank^{1} | Seed |
|---|---|---|---|
| GER | Kristina Barrois | 89 | 1 |
| RUS | Anastasia Pivovarova | 132 | 2 |
| BEL | Kirsten Flipkens | 146 | 3 |
| ITA | Corinna Dentoni | 171 | 4 |
| USA | Julia Cohen | 172 | 5 |
| ARG | Florencia Molinero | 176 | 6 |
| BUL | Dia Evtimova | 180 | 7 |
| ROU | Mihaela Buzărnescu | 194 | 8 |

- ^{1} Rankings are as of August 29, 2011.

=== Other entrants ===
The following players received wildcards into the singles main draw:

- (Germany) Michaela Frlicka
- (Croatia) Silvia Njirić
- (Slovakia) Monika Staníková
- (Germany) Stephanie Vorih

The following players received entry from the qualifying draw:

- (Croatia) Indire Akiki
- (Italy) Nicole Clerico
- (Slovenia) Anja Prislan
- (Croatia) Petra Šunić

== Champions ==
=== Singles ===
(Bulgaria) Dia Evtimova def. (Russia) Anastasia Pivovarova, 6–2, 6–2

=== Doubles ===
(Portugal) Maria João Koehler / (Hungary) Katalin Marosi def. (Croatia) Maria Abramović / (Romania) Mihaela Buzărnescu, 6–0, 6–3
