= 2015 Fed Cup Europe/Africa Zone Group I – Pool B =

Group B of the 2015 Fed Cup Europe/Africa Zone Group I was one of four pools in the Europe/Africa zone of the 2015 Fed Cup. Four teams competed in a round robin competition, with the top team and the bottom team proceeding to their respective sections of the play-offs: the top team played for advancement to the World Group II Play-offs, while the bottom team faced potential relegation to Group II.

== Standings ==
		(United Kingdom) GBR	(Ukraine) UKR	(Turkey) TUR	(Liechtenstein) LIE	RR; W–L	Match; W–L	Set; W–L	Game; W–L	Standings
20	Great Britain		3–0	1–2	3–0	2–1	7–2	15–6	116–76	1
26	Ukraine	0–3		2–1	3–0	2–1	5–4	13–9	110–88	3
38	Turkey	2–1	1–2		3–0	2–1	6–3	12–7	94–74	2
47	Liechtenstein	0–3	0–3	0–3		0–3	0–9	1–18	30–112	4

== Round-robin ==
=== Great Britain vs. Liechtenstein ===
Great Britain
3
Syma Sport and Events Centre, Budapest, Hungary
4 February 2015
Hard (indoors)

Liechtenstein
0

			1	2	3
1	(United Kingdom) (Liechtenstein)	Johanna Konta; Kathinka von Deichmann	6; 0	6; 0
2	(United Kingdom) (Liechtenstein)	Heather Watson; Stephanie Vogt	6; 2	6; 3
3	(United Kingdom) (Liechtenstein)	Jocelyn Rae / Anna Smith; Kathinka von Deichmann / Stephanie Vogt	6; 1	6; 2

=== Ukraine vs. Turkey ===
Ukraine
2
Syma Sport and Events Centre, Budapest, Hungary
4 February 2015
Hard (indoors)

Turkey
1

			1	2	3
1	(Ukraine) (Turkey)	Lesia Tsurenko; Pemra Özgen	6; 2	6; 2
2	(Ukraine) (Turkey)	Elina Svitolina; Çağla Büyükakçay	3; 6	6; 4	0; 6
3	(Ukraine) (Turkey)	Olga Savchuk / Lesia Tsurenko; Çağla Büyükakçay / İpek Soylu	7; 5	6; 1

=== Great Britain vs. Turkey ===
Great Britain
1
Syma Sport and Events Centre, Budapest, Hungary
5 February 2015
Hard (indoors)

Turkey
2

			1	2	3
1	(United Kingdom) (Turkey)	Johanna Konta; İpek Soylu	3; 6	6^{6} 7^{8}
2	(United Kingdom) (Turkey)	Heather Watson; Çağla Büyükakçay	2; 6	6; 3	5; 7
3	(United Kingdom) (Turkey)	Jocelyn Rae / Anna Smith; Başak Eraydın / Pemra Özgen	6; 2	6; 1

=== Ukraine vs. Liechtenstein ===
Ukraine
3
Syma Sport and Events Centre, Budapest, Hungary
5 February 2015
Hard (indoors)

Liechtenstein
0

			1	2	3
1	(Ukraine) (Liechtenstein)	Kateryna Kozlova; Kathinka von Deichmann	6; 1	6; 1
2	(Ukraine) (Liechtenstein)	Elina Svitolina; Stephanie Vogt	4; 6	6; 2	6; 3
3	(Ukraine) (Liechtenstein)	Olga Savchuk / Lesia Tsurenko; Kathinka von Deichmann / Lynn Zund	6; 2	6; 1

=== Great Britain vs. Ukraine ===
Great Britain
3
Syma Sport and Events Centre, Budapest, Hungary
6 February 2015
Hard (indoors)

Ukraine
0

			1	2	3
1	(United Kingdom) (Ukraine)	Johanna Konta; Lesia Tsurenko	6; 3	6; 2
2	(United Kingdom) (Ukraine)	Heather Watson; Elina Svitolina	2; 6	7; 5	6; 4
3	(United Kingdom) (Ukraine)	Jocelyn Rae / Anna Smith; Elina Svitolina / Olga Savchuk	6^{6} 7^{8}	7; 5	6; 4

=== Turkey vs. Liechtenstein ===
Turkey
3
Syma Sport and Events Centre, Budapest, Hungary
6 February 2015
Hard (indoors)

Liechtenstein
0

			1	2	3
1	(Turkey) (Liechtenstein)	İpek Soylu; Lynn Zund	6; 0	6; 2
2	(Turkey) (Liechtenstein)	Çağla Büyükakçay; Stephanie Vogt	6; 2	6; 2
3	(Turkey) (Liechtenstein)	Pemra Özgen / Çağla Büyükakçay; Sandra Hinterberger / Lynn Zund	6; 0	6; 0
