= 2015 Fed Cup Europe/Africa Zone Group I – play-offs =

The play-offs of the 2015 Fed Cup Europe/Africa Zone Group I were the final stages of the Group I zonal competition involving teams from Europe and Africa. Using the positions determined in their pools, the fifteen teams faced off to determine their placing in the 2015 Fed Cup Europe/Africa Zone Group I. The top two teams advanced to World Group II play-offs, and the bottom two teams were relegated to the Europe/Africa Zone Group II.

== Pool results ==
Placing	Pool A	Pool B	Pool C	Pool D
1	Serbia	Great Britain	Belarus	Croatia
2	Hungary	Turkey	Georgia	Belgium
3	Austria	Ukraine	Bulgaria	Israel
4	—N/a	Liechtenstein	Portugal	Latvia

== Promotional play-offs ==
The first placed teams of each pool were drawn in head-to-head rounds. The winner of each round advanced to the World Group II play-offs.

=== Serbia vs. Croatia ===
Serbia
2
Syma Sport and Events Centre, Budapest, Hungary
7 February 2015
Hard (indoors)

Croatia
0

			1	2	3
1	(Serbia) (Croatia)	Ivana Jorović; Ana Konjuh	6; 3	2; 6	7; 5
2	(Serbia) (Croatia)	Aleksandra Krunić; Donna Vekić	6; 1	6; 1
3	(Serbia) (Croatia)	Ivana Jorović / Aleksandra Krunić; Darija Jurak / Ana Konjuh				not played

=== Belarus vs. Great Britain ===
Belarus
2
Syma Sport and Events Centre, Budapest, Hungary
7 February 2015
Hard (indoors)

Great Britain
0

			1	2	3
1	(Belarus) (United Kingdom)	Olga Govortsova; Johanna Konta	6; 0	6; 1
2	(Belarus) (United Kingdom)	Victoria Azarenka; Heather Watson	6; 4	6; 1
3	(Belarus) (United Kingdom)	Victoria Azarenka / Olga Govortsova; Jocelyn Rae / Anna Smith				not played

== 5th place play-off ==
The runner-up teams from pools B and C and those from A and D competed in order to establish which two teams would place joint fifth in the final standings and which two would place joint seventh.

=== Hungary vs. Belgium ===
Hungary
3
Syma Sport and Events Centre, Budapest, Hungary
7 February 2015
Hard (indoors)

Belgium
0

			1	2	3
1	(Hungary) (Belgium)	Anna Bondár; Alison Van Uytvanck				w/o
2	(Hungary) (Belgium)	Réka-Luca Jani; Kirsten Flipkens	2; 6	7^{7} 6^{5}		retired
3	(Hungary) (Belgium)	Anna Bondár / Dalma Gálfi; Kirsten Flipkens / Alison Van Uytvanck				w/o

=== Turkey vs. Georgia ===
Turkey
2
Syma Sport and Events Centre, Budapest, Hungary
7 February 2015
Hard (indoors)

Georgia
1

			1	2	3
1	(Turkey) (Georgia (country))	Başak Eraydın; Mariam Bolkvadze	3; 6	3; 6
2	(Turkey) (Georgia (country))	İpek Soylu; Ekaterine Gorgodze	2; 6	6; 0	6; 1
3	(Turkey) (Georgia (country))	Çağla Büyükakçay / Pemra Özgen; Oksana Kalashnikova / Sofia Shapatava	7; 5	5; 7	1; 0	retired

== 9th place play-off ==
The third-placed teams of Groups B and C competed to determine the ninth- and tenth-placed teams.

=== Ukraine vs. Bulgaria ===
Ukraine
2
Syma Sport and Events Centre, Budapest, Hungary
7 February 2015
Hard (indoors)

Bulgaria
0

			1	2	3
1	(Ukraine) (Bulgaria)	Kateryna Kozlova; Viktoriya Tomova	6; 4	6; 0
2	(Ukraine) (Bulgaria)	Elina Svitolina; Dia Evtimova	6; 2	6; 3
3	(Ukraine) (Bulgaria)	Olga Savchuk / Lesia Tsurenko; Dia Evtimova / Viktoriya Tomova				not played

== Relegation play-offs ==
The teams placing last in each pool competed to keep their place in the Europe/Africa Zone Group I. The bottom-placed team from group A faced the bottom-placed team from Group D, whilst Group B's and Group C's bottom-placed teams faced off. The losers were relegated to the 2016 Europe/Africa Zone Group II.

=== Austria vs. Latvia ===
Austria
1
Syma Sport and Events Centre, Budapest, Hungary
7 February 2015
Hard (indoors)

Latvia
2

			1	2	3
1	(Austria) (Latvia)	Julia Grabher; Jeļena Ostapenko	2; 6	1; 6
2	(Austria) (Latvia)	Barbara Haas; Diāna Marcinkēviča	6; 0	2; 6	6; 0
3	(Austria) (Latvia)	Julia Grabher / Sandra Klemenschits; Diāna Marcinkēviča / Jeļena Ostapenko	5; 7	3; 6

=== Liechtenstein vs. Portugal ===
Liechtenstein
0
Syma Sport and Events Centre, Budapest, Hungary
7 February 2015
Hard (indoors)

Portugal
2

			1	2	3
1	(Liechtenstein) (Portugal)	Kathinka von Deichmann; Maria João Koehler	3; 6	0; 6
2	(Liechtenstein) (Portugal)	Stephanie Vogt; Michelle Larcher de Brito	6^{7} 7^{9}	5; 7
3	(Liechtenstein) (Portugal)	Stephanie Vogt / Kathinka von Deichmann; Maria João Koehler / Michelle Larcher de Brito				not played

== Final placements ==
Placing	Teams	
Promoted	Serbia	Belarus
Third	Croatia	Great Britain
Fifth	Hungary	Turkey
Seventh	Belgium	Georgia
Ninth	Ukraine	
Tenth	Bulgaria	
Eleventh	Israel	
Twelfth	Latvia	Portugal
Relegated	Austria	Liechtenstein

- Serbia and Belarus advanced to World Group II play-offs.
- Austria and Liechtenstein were relegated to Europe/Africa Group II in 2016.
