= 2015 Fed Cup Europe/Africa Zone Group I – Pool C =

Group C of the 2015 Fed Cup Europe/Africa Zone Group I was one of four pools in the Europe/Africa zone of the 2015 Fed Cup. Four teams competed in a round robin competition, with the top team and the bottom team proceeding to their respective sections of the play-offs: the top team played for advancement to the World Group II Play-offs, while the bottom team faced potential relegation to Group II.

== Standings ==
		(Belarus) BLR	(Portugal) POR	(Bulgaria) BUL	(Georgia (country)) GEO	RR; W–L	Match; W–L	Set; W–L	Game; W–L	Standings
24	Belarus		2–1	3–0	3–0	3–0	8–1	16–5	117–78	1
32	Portugal	1–2		0–3	1–2	0–3	2–7	5–14	73–102	4
36	Bulgaria	0–3	3–0		1–2	1–2	4–5	9–10	88–88	3
39	Georgia	0–3	2–1	2–1		2–1	4–5	9–11	85–95	2

== Round-robin ==
=== Belarus vs. Georgia ===
Belarus
3
Syma Sport and Events Centre, Budapest, Hungary
4 February 2015
Hard (indoors)

Georgia
0

			1	2	3
1	(Belarus) (Georgia (country))	Olga Govortsova; Ekaterine Gorgodze	6; 1	6; 3
2	(Belarus) (Georgia (country))	Aliaksandra Sasnovich; Sofia Shapatava	6; 1	4; 6	7; 5
3	(Belarus) (Georgia (country))	Vera Lapko / Aliaksandra Sasnovich; Oksana Kalashnikova / Sofia Shapatava	6; 3	6; 4

=== Portugal vs. Bulgaria ===
Portugal
0
Syma Sport and Events Centre, Budapest, Hungary
4 February 2015
Hard (indoors)

Bulgaria
3

			1	2	3
1	(Portugal) (Bulgaria)	Maria João Koehler; Elitsa Kostova	2; 6	1; 6
2	(Portugal) (Bulgaria)	Michelle Larcher de Brito; Tsvetana Pironkova	4; 6	5; 7
3	(Portugal) (Bulgaria)	Michelle Larcher de Brito / Bárbara Luz; Dia Evtimova / Viktoriya Tomova	0; 6	3; 6

=== Belarus vs. Bulgaria ===
Belarus
3
Syma Sport and Events Centre, Budapest, Hungary
5 February 2015
Hard (indoors)

Bulgaria
0

			1	2	3
1	(Belarus) (Bulgaria)	Olga Govortsova; Elitsa Kostova	6; 2	6; 3
2	(Belarus) (Bulgaria)	Victoria Azarenka; Tsvetana Pironkova	6; 3	2; 6	7; 5
3	(Belarus) (Bulgaria)	Vera Lapko / Aliaksandra Sasnovich; Dia Evtimova / Viktoriya Tomova	7; 5	6; 1

=== Portugal vs. Georgia ===
Portugal
1
Syma Sport and Events Centre, Budapest, Hungary
5 February 2015
Hard (indoors)

Georgia
2

			1	2	3
1	(Portugal) (Georgia (country))	Maria João Koehler; Ekaterine Gorgodze	3; 6	4; 6
2	(Portugal) (Georgia (country))	Michelle Larcher de Brito; Sofia Shapatava	6; 1	6; 3
3	(Portugal) (Georgia (country))	Maria João Koehler / Michelle Larcher de Brito; Oksana Kalashnikova / Sofia Shapatava	5; 7	4; 6

=== Belarus vs. Portugal ===
Belarus
2
Syma Sport and Events Centre, Budapest, Hungary
6 February 2015
Hard (indoors)

Portugal
1

			1	2	3
1	(Belarus) (Portugal)	Olga Govortsova; Maria João Koehler	6; 3	6; 2
2	(Belarus) (Portugal)	Aliaksandra Sasnovich; Michelle Larcher de Brito	4; 6	2; 6
3	(Belarus) (Portugal)	Vera Lapko / Aliaksandra Sasnovich; Bárbara Luz / Inês Murta	6; 4	6^{2} 7^{7}	6; 2

=== Bulgaria vs. Georgia ===
Bulgaria
1
Syma Sport and Events Centre, Budapest, Hungary
6 February 2015
Hard (indoors)

Georgia
2

			1	2	3
1	(Bulgaria) (Georgia (country))	Dia Evtimova; Ekaterine Gorgodze	4; 6	4; 6
2	(Bulgaria) (Georgia (country))	Elitsa Kostova; Sofia Shapatava	6; 3	7^{8} 6^{6}
3	(Bulgaria) (Georgia (country))	Dia Evtimova / Elitsa Kostova; Oksana Kalashnikova / Sofia Shapatava	3; 6	2; 6
