= 2015 Fed Cup Europe/Africa Zone Group I – Pool A =

Group A of the 2015 Fed Cup Europe/Africa Zone Group I was one of four pools in the Europe/Africa zone of the 2015 Fed Cup. Four teams competed in a round robin competition, with the top team and the bottom team proceeding to their respective sections of the play-offs: the top team played for advancement to the World Group II Play-offs, while the bottom team faced potential relegation to Group II.

== Standings ==
		(Serbia) SRB	(Hungary) HUN	(Austria) AUT	RR; W–L	Match; W–L	Set; W–L	Game; W–L
6	Serbia		2–1	3–0	5–1	11–3	76–49	1
28	Hungary	1–2		3–0	4–2	7–5	63–55	2
35	Austria	0–3	0–3		0–6	0–10	28–63	3

== Round-robin ==
=== Serbia vs. Austria ===
Serbia
3
Syma Sport and Events Centre, Budapest, Hungary
4 February 2015
Hard (indoors)

Austria
0

			1	2	3
1	(Serbia) (Austria)	Ivana Jorović; Barbara Haas	6; 3	6; 2
2	(Serbia) (Austria)	Aleksandra Krunić; Patricia Mayr-Achleitner	6; 2	6; 2
3	(Serbia) (Austria)	Ivana Jorović / Aleksandra Krunić; Julia Grabher / Sandra Klemenschits	6; 1	6; 3

=== Hungary vs. Serbia ===
Hungary
1
Syma Sport and Events Centre, Budapest, Hungary
5 February 2015
Hard (indoors)

Serbia
2

			1	2	3
1	(Hungary) (Serbia)	Dalma Gálfi; Ivana Jorović	1; 6	0; 6
2	(Hungary) (Serbia)	Tímea Babos; Aleksandra Krunić	6^{6} 7^{8}	6; 0	6^{5} 7^{7}
3	(Hungary) (Serbia)	Tímea Babos / Réka-Luca Jani; Ivana Jorović / Aleksandra Krunić	4; 6	7^{7} 6^{2}	6; 2

=== Hungary vs. Austria ===
Hungary
3
Syma Sport and Events Centre, Budapest, Hungary
6 February 2015
Hard (indoors)

Austria
0

			1	2	3
1	(Hungary) (Austria)	Réka-Luca Jani; Barbara Haas	7; 5	6; 2
2	(Hungary) (Austria)	Tímea Babos; Patricia Mayr-Achleitner	1; 0			retired
3	(Hungary) (Austria)	Tímea Babos / Anna Bondár; Julia Grabher / Sandra Klemenschits	7^{7} 6^{2}	6; 2
