= 2018 Zagreb Ladies Open – Singles =

Singles
- 2018 Zagreb Ladies Open

Final
- Champion: (Croatia) Tereza Mrdeža
- Runner-up: (Argentina) Paula Ormaechea
- Score: 2–6, 6–4, 7–5

Events
Singles	Doubles
← 2011 ·	Zagreb Ladies Open	· 2019 →

Dia Evtimova was the defending champion, having won the previous event in 2011, but chose not to participate.

Tereza Mrdeža won the title, defeating Paula Ormaechea in the final, 2–6, 6–4, 7–5.

== Seeds ==
1. (Uzbekistan) Sabina Sharipova (first round)
2. (Bulgaria) Viktoriya Tomova (second round)
3. (Spain) Georgina García Pérez (quarterfinals)
4. (Greece) Valentini Grammatikopoulou (second round)
5. (Bulgaria) Elitsa Kostova (second round)
6. (Italy) Martina Di Giuseppe (first round)
7. (Slovakia) Jana Čepelová (second round)
8. (Croatia) Tereza Mrdeža (champion)

== Draw ==
=== Key ===
- Q = Qualifier
- WC = Wild card
- LL = Lucky loser
- Alt = Alternate
- SE = Special exempt
- PR = Protected ranking
- ITF = ITF entry
- JE = Junior exempt
- w/o = Walkover
- r = Retired
- d = Defaulted
- SR = Special ranking

=== Finals ===
Semifinals
(Romania) Alexandra Cadanțu	2	1^{r}
8	(Croatia) Tereza Mrdeža	6	5
(Russia) Olga Doroshina	5	4
Q	(Argentina) Paula Ormaechea	7	6

Final
8	(Croatia) Tereza Mrdeža	2	6	7
Q	(Argentina) Paula Ormaechea	6	4	5

=== Top half ===
First round
1	(Uzbekistan) S Sharipova	1	3
(Romania) A Cadanțu	6	6
(Italy) A Grymalska	6	6
(Netherlands) C Burger	4	3
(Turkey) P Özgen	6	7
Q	(Sweden) C Lister	3	5
(Chile) D Seguel	6	5	1^{r}
7	(Slovakia) J Čepelová	4	7	4
3	(Spain) G García Pérez	1	7^{7}	6
(Slovakia) R Šramková	6	6^{5}	4
WC	(Bosnia and Herzegovina) A Husarić	5	4
WC	(Serbia) B Jovanovski Petrović	7	6
(Russia) L Samsonova	6^{5}	6	7^{7}
PR	(Russia) A Panova	7^{7}	3	6^{5}
(Hungary) D Gálfi	3	1
8	(Croatia) T Mrdeža	6	6

Second round
(Romania) A Cadanțu	6	6
(Italy) A Grymalska	2	2
(Turkey) P Özgen	6	6
7	(Slovakia) J Čepelová	3	3
3	(Spain) G García Pérez	1	6	7
WC	(Serbia) B Jovanovski Petrović	6	3	5
(Russia) L Samsonova	6	3	4
8	(Croatia) T Mrdeža	4	6	6

Quarterfinals
(Romania) A Cadanțu	6	6
(Turkey) P Özgen	2	3
3	(Spain) G García Pérez	3	3
8	(Croatia) T Mrdeža	6	6

Semifinals
(Romania) A Cadanțu	2	1^{r}
8	(Croatia) T Mrdeža	6	5

=== Bottom half ===
First round
6	(Italy) M Di Giuseppe	3	6^{3}
(Venezuela) A Gámiz	6	7^{7}
(Russia) O Doroshina	6	5	6
(Slovakia) M Hončová	1	7	1
(France) M Georges	4	1
(Slovenia) K Juvan	6	6
WC	(Croatia) L Bošković	3	6^{5}
4	(Greece) V Grammatikopoulou	6	7^{7}
5	(Bulgaria) E Kostova	6	6
Q	(Hungary) Á Bukta	3	4
(Croatia) T Lukas	7	7
WC	(Croatia) S Njirić	5	5
Q	(Italy) A Moratelli	5	1
Q	(Argentina) P Ormaechea	7	6
PR	(North Macedonia) L Gjorcheska	5	2
2	(Bulgaria) V Tomova	7	6

Second round
(Venezuela) A Gámiz	3	2
(Russia) O Doroshina	6	6
(Slovenia) K Juvan	6	6
4	(Greece) V Grammatikopoulou	3	2
5	(Bulgaria) E Kostova	6	2	3
(Croatia) T Lukas	1	6	6
Q	(Argentina) P Ormaechea	5	6	6
2	(Bulgaria) V Tomova	7	2	4

Quarterfinals
(Russia) O Doroshina	6	0	6
(Slovenia) K Juvan	1	6	3
(Croatia) T Lukas	5	7	1
Q	(Argentina) P Ormaechea	7	5	6

Semifinals
(Russia) O Doroshina	5	4
Q	(Argentina) P Ormaechea	7	6
