= 2011 Zagreb Ladies Open – Doubles =

Doubles
- 2011 Zagreb Ladies Open

Final
- Champions: (Portugal) Maria João Koehler (Hungary) Katalin Marosi
- Runners-up: (Croatia) Maria Abramović (Romania) Mihaela Buzărnescu
- Score: 6–0, 6–3

Events
Singles	Doubles
← 2010 ·	Zagreb Ladies Open	· 2018 →

Mailen Auroux and Nataša Zorić were the defending champions, but both chose not to participate.

Maria João Koehler and Katalin Marosi won the title, defeating Maria Abramović and Mihaela Buzărnescu in the final, 6–0, 6–3.

== Seeds ==
1. (Germany) Kristina Barrois / (Belgium) Kirsten Flipkens (semifinals)
2. (Croatia) Maria Abramović / (Romania) Mihaela Buzărnescu (final)
3. (Italy) Nicole Clerico / (United States) Julia Cohen (quarterfinals)
4. (Argentina) Florencia Molinero / (Argentina) Paula Ormaechea (first round)

== Draw ==
=== Key ===
- Q = Qualifier
- WC = Wild card
- LL = Lucky loser
- Alt = Alternate
- SE = Special exempt
- PR = Protected ranking
- ITF = ITF entry
- JE = Junior exempt
- w/o = Walkover
- r = Retired
- d = Defaulted
- SR = Special ranking

First round
(Slovenia) A Lukić (Slovenia) P Vollmeier	1	4
WC	(Slovakia) M Staníková (Germany) S Vorih	6	6
4	(Argentina) F Molinero (Argentina) P Ormaechea	4	1
(Portugal) MJ Koehler (Hungary) K Marosi	6	6
(Croatia) K Popović (Slovenia) A Prislan	5	5
(Croatia) I Akiki (Croatia) S Njirić	7	7
(Poland) J Jegiołka (Austria) J Toljan
(Italy) C Dentoni (Croatia) A Mijačika	w/o
(Bosnia and Herzegovina) J Kajtazovič (France) G Radovanovic	5	4
3	(Italy) N Clerico (United States) J Cohen	6	6
(France) A Bergot (Netherlands) B Schoofs	5	6	[8]
(Croatia) I Klepić (Croatia) A Šušak	7	2	[10]
(Croatia) D Banoveć (Croatia) K Bekavac	3	2
2	(Croatia) M Abramović (Romania) M Buzărnescu	6	6

Quarterfinals
1	(Germany) K Barrois (Belgium) K Flipkens	6	7
WC	(Slovakia) M Staníková (Germany) S Vorih	0	5
(Portugal) MJ Koehler (Hungary) K Marosi	w/o
(Croatia) I Akiki (Croatia) S Njirić
(Italy) C Dentoni (Croatia) A Mijačika	7^{7}	6
3	(Italy) N Clerico (United States) J Cohen	6^{3}	0
(Croatia) I Klepić (Croatia) A Šušak	0	1
2	(Croatia) M Abramović (Romania) M Buzărnescu	6	6

Semifinals
1	(Germany) K Barrois (Belgium) K Flipkens	5	0
(Portugal) MJ Koehler (Hungary) K Marosi	7	6
(Italy) C Dentoni (Croatia) A Mijačika	5	3
2	(Croatia) M Abramović (Romania) M Buzărnescu	7	6

Finals
(Portugal) MJ Koehler (Hungary) K Marosi	6	6
2	(Croatia) M Abramović (Romania) M Buzărnescu	0	3
