= 2008 Fed Cup Europe/Africa Zone Group I – Pool A =

Group A of the 2008 Fed Cup Europe/Africa Zone Group I was one of four pools in the Europe/Africa Zone Group I of the 2008 Fed Cup. Four teams competed in a round robin competition, with the top team and the bottom team proceeding to their respective sections of the play-offs: the top team played for advancement to the World Group II Play-offs, while the bottom team faced potential relegation to Group II.

		(Netherlands) NED	(Bulgaria) BUL	(Luxembourg) LUX	(Portugal) POR	RR; W–L	Set; W–L	Game; W–L	Standings
28	Netherlands		2–0	2–1	3–0	3–0	14–2	92–53	1
30	Bulgaria	0–2		2–1	3–0	2–1	11–7	89–70	2
36	Luxembourg	1–2	1–2		2–0	1–2	9–9	84–84	3
46	Portugal	0–3	0–3	0–2		0–3	1–16	41–99	4

== Netherlands vs. Luxembourg ==
Netherlands
2
SYMA Sportközpont, Budapest, Hungary
30 January 2008
Taraflex carpet (indoors)

Luxembourg
1

			1	2	3
1	(Netherlands) (Luxembourg)	Renée Reinhard; Claudine Schaul	6; 1	6; 3
2	(Netherlands) (Luxembourg)	Nicole Thijssen; Anne Kremer	2; 6	4; 6
3	(Netherlands) (Luxembourg)	Nicole Thijssen / Pauline Wong; Anne Kremer / Mandy Minella	7^{7} 6^{5}	6; 2

== Bulgaria vs. Portugal ==
Bulgaria
3
SYMA Sportközpont, Budapest, Hungary
30 January 2008
Taraflex carpet (indoors)

Portugal
0

			1	2	3
1	(Bulgaria) (Portugal)	Dia Evtimova; Ana Catarina Nogueira	6; 2	7; 5
2	(Bulgaria) (Portugal)	Tsvetana Pironkova; Neuza Silva	6; 1	6; 0
3	(Bulgaria) (Portugal)	Dia Evtimova / Tsvetana Pironkova; Magali de Lattre / Maria João Koehler	6; 1	6; 2

== Netherlands vs. Portugal ==
Netherlands
3
SYMA Sportközpont, Budapest, Hungary
31 January 2008
Taraflex carpet (indoors)

Portugal
0

			1	2	3
1	(Netherlands) (Portugal)	Renée Reinhard; Ana Catarina Nogueira	6; 0	6; 3
2	(Netherlands) (Portugal)	Arantxa Rus; Neuza Silva	7; 5	6; 4
3	(Netherlands) (Portugal)	Nicole Thijssen / Pauline Wong; Magali de Lattre / Maria João Koehler	6; 2	6; 4

== Bulgaria vs. Luxembourg ==
Bulgaria
2
SYMA Sportközpont, Budapest, Hungary
31 January 2008
Taraflex carpet (indoors)

Luxembourg
1

			1	2	3
1	(Bulgaria) (Luxembourg)	Dia Evtimova; Mandy Minella	3; 6	7^{7} 6^{2}	3; 6
2	(Bulgaria) (Luxembourg)	Tsvetana Pironkova; Anne Kremer	4; 6	6; 1	6; 3
3	(Bulgaria) (Luxembourg)	Dia Evtimova / Tsvetana Pironkova; Mandy Minella / Claudine Schaul	6; 4	6; 3

== Netherlands vs. Bulgaria ==
Netherlands
2
SYMA Sportközpont, Budapest, Hungary
1 February 2008
Taraflex carpet (indoors)

Bulgaria
0

			1	2	3
1	(Netherlands) (Bulgaria)	Renée Reinhard; Dia Evtimova	6; 0	6; 3
2	(Netherlands) (Bulgaria)	Arantxa Rus; Tsvetana Pironkova	6; 4	6; 4
3	(Netherlands) (Bulgaria)					not played

== Luxembourg vs. Portugal ==
Luxembourg
2
SYMA Sportközpont, Budapest, Hungary
1 February 2008
Taraflex carpet (indoors)

Portugal
0

			1	2	3
1	(Luxembourg) (Portugal)	Claudine Schaul; Ana Catarina Nogueira	1; 6	6; 1	6; 2
2	(Luxembourg) (Portugal)	Anne Kremer; Magali de Lattre	6; 2	6; 1
3	(Luxembourg) (Portugal)					not played

== See also ==
- Fed Cup structure
