= 2019 Zagreb Ladies Open – Singles =

Singles
- 2019 Zagreb Ladies Open

Final
- Champion: (Ukraine) Maryna Chernyshova
- Runner-up: (Hungary) Réka Luca Jani
- Score: 6–1, 6–4

Events
Singles	Doubles
← 2018 ·	Zagreb Ladies Open	· 2020 →

Tereza Mrdeža was the defending champion, but lost in the second round to Anna Bondár.

Maryna Chernyshova won the title, defeating Réka Luca Jani in the final, 6–1, 6–4.

== Seeds ==
1. (Austria) Barbara Haas (first round)
2. (Slovakia) Rebecca Šramková (second round)
3. (Argentina) Paula Ormaechea (first round)
4. (Italy) Martina Di Giuseppe (second round)
5. (Turkey) Pemra Özgen (first round)
6. (Croatia) Tereza Mrdeža (second round)
7. (Romania) Irina Bara (second round)
8. (Italy) Martina Trevisan (second round)

== Draw ==
=== Key ===
- Q = Qualifier
- WC = Wild card
- LL = Lucky loser
- Alt = Alternate
- SE = Special exempt
- PR = Protected ranking
- ITF = ITF entry
- JE = Junior exempt
- w/o = Walkover
- r = Retired
- d = Defaulted
- SR = Special ranking

=== Finals ===
Semifinals
(Turkey) Çağla Büyükakçay	4	3
Q	(Ukraine) Maryna Chernyshova	6	6
(Hungary) Anna Bondár	1	3
Q	(Hungary) Réka Luca Jani	6	6

Final
Q	(Ukraine) Maryna Chernyshova	6	6
Q	(Hungary) Réka Luca Jani	1	4

=== Top half ===
First round
1	(Austria) B Haas	6	6^{1}	3
(Chile) D Seguel	3	7^{7}	6
Q	(Bosnia and Herzegovina) D Herdželaš	7^{7}	2	4
(Turkey) Ç Büyükakçay	6^{5}	6	6
(Bulgaria) E Kostova	6	6^{2}	6
WC	(Croatia) S Njirić	4	7^{7}	3
(Germany) A Lottner	6	7
5	(Turkey) P Özgen	3	5
3	(Argentina) P Ormaechea	0	6	4
(Russia) V Ivakhnenko	6	4	6
(France) A Hesse	6^{6}	4
WC	(Croatia) L Bošković	7^{8}	6
Q	(Ukraine) M Chernyshova	6	6
(Romania) LI Paar	4	2
SE	(Croatia) T Lukas	4	1
7	(Romania) I Bara	6	6

Second round
(Chile) D Seguel	1	2
(Turkey) Ç Büyükakçay	6	6
(Bulgaria) E Kostova	6	4	7^{7}
(Germany) A Lottner	2	6	6^{4}
(Russia) V Ivakhnenko	7	1	6
WC	(Croatia) L Bošković	5	6	1
Q	(Ukraine) M Chernyshova	6	6
7	(Romania) I Bara	2	4

Quarterfinals
(Turkey) Ç Büyükakçay	6	6
(Bulgaria) E Kostova	2	4
(Russia) V Ivakhnenko	4	3
Q	(Ukraine) M Chernyshova	6	6

Semifinals
(Turkey) Ç Büyükakçay	4	3
Q	(Ukraine) M Chernyshova	6	6

=== Bottom half ===
First round
6	(Croatia) T Mrdeža	6	6
Q	(France) E Cascino	0	3
Q	(Russia) A Fomina	6	3	2
(Hungary) A Bondár	3	6	6
(Ukraine) M Kostyuk	6	2	3
Q	(Russia) V Kan	1	6	6
(Turkey) B Eraydın	2	6^{4}
4	(Italy) M Di Giuseppe	6	7^{7}
8	(Italy) M Trevisan	6	6
WC	(Croatia) A Ružić	2	2
Q	(Greece) D Papamichail	6	7
(Belgium) M Zanevska	4	5
Q	(Slovenia) N Potočnik	3	0
Q	(Hungary) RL Jani	6	6
WC	(Serbia) M Đaković	1	3
2	(Slovakia) R Šramková	6	6

Second round
6	(Croatia) T Mrdeža	6^{3}	7^{7}	2
(Hungary) A Bondár	7^{7}	6^{4}	6
Q	(Russia) V Kan	6	6
4	(Italy) M Di Giuseppe	1	4
8	(Italy) M Trevisan	3	6	4
Q	(Greece) D Papamichail	6	1	6
Q	(Hungary) RL Jani	6	6
2	(Slovakia) R Šramková	3	3

Quarterfinals
(Hungary) A Bondár	6	6
Q	(Russia) V Kan	0	1
Q	(Greece) D Papamichail	4	5
Q	(Hungary) RL Jani	6	7

Semifinals
(Hungary) A Bondár	1	3
Q	(Hungary) RL Jani	6	6
