= Aliaksandra Sasnovich =

Belarusian tennis player (born 1994)

Aliaksandra Sasnovich Аляксандра Сасновіч
- Sasnovich at the 2026 Wimbledon Championships
- Full name: Aliaksandra Aliaksandraŭna Sasnovich
- Country (sports): Belarus
- Born: 22 March 1994 (age 32) Minsk, Belarus
- Height: 1.74 m (5 ft 9 in)
- Plays: Right-handed (two-handed backhand)
- Coach: Dzmitry Klimenko
- Prize money: $6,929,566

Singles
- Career record: 487–342
- Career titles: 11 ITF
- Highest ranking: No. 29 (19 September 2022)
- Current ranking: No. 90 (9 November 2026)

Grand Slam singles results
- Australian Open: 3R (2018, 2019)
- French Open: 4R (2022)
- Wimbledon: 4R (2018)
- US Open: 3R (2018, 2020)

Doubles
- Career record: 136–112
- Career titles: 7 ITF
- Highest ranking: No. 39 (23 August 2021)
- Current ranking: No. 680 (9 November 2026)

Grand Slam doubles results
- Australian Open: 3R (2019, 2020, 2023)
- French Open: QF (2020)
- Wimbledon: 2R (2019)
- US Open: SF (2019)

Team competitions
- Fed Cup: 25–17
- Last updated on: 13 November 2026.

Aliaksandra Aliaksandraŭna Sasnovich (Note: Belarusian: Аляксандра Аляксандраўна Сасновіч; Russian: Алекса́ндра Алекса́ндровна Сосно́вич, romanized: Aleksandra Aleksandrovna Sosnovich.) (born 22 March 1994) is a Belarusian professional tennis player. She achieved her best singles ranking of world No. 29 on 19 September 2022, and peaked at No. 39 in the WTA doubles rankings on 23 August 2021. She has won eleven singles and seven doubles titles on the ITF Circuit. She has reached a major semifinal in doubles, at the 2019 US Open, together with Viktória Hrunčáková (then Kužmová).

== Personal life and background ==
Sasnovich has a younger sister, Polina. She came from a sporty family. Sasnovich's mother, Natalia, played basketball while Sasnovich's father, Aliaksandr, played hockey and tennis for 20 years on the senior circuit. She started playing tennis at the age of nine and has stated that her favorite shot is backhand down the line, while her favorite surface is indoor hardcourt. She studied for a physical culture degree in Minsk. Beside Belarusian, she speaks Russian, English and some French.

== National representation ==
=== Fed Cup ===
Playing for Belarus in the Billie Jean King Cup, Sasnovich has a win–loss record of 25–16. This record includes a 4–0 run in the first two rounds of the 2017 Fed Cup World Group, which propelled Belarus to upset victories against Netherlands and Switzerland and helped them reach their first Fed Cup final. (Note: Aliaksandra Sasnovich at the Billie Jean King Cup (archived)) In the final against United States, Sasnovich first lost to CoCo Vandeweghe in the straight-sets, but then made a win over Sloane Stephens. In a decisive doubles-match, Sasnovich and Aryna Sabalenka lost to Shelby Rogers and Vandeweghe.

== Career ==
=== 2009–17: First steps, maiden WTA Tour final & top-10 win ===
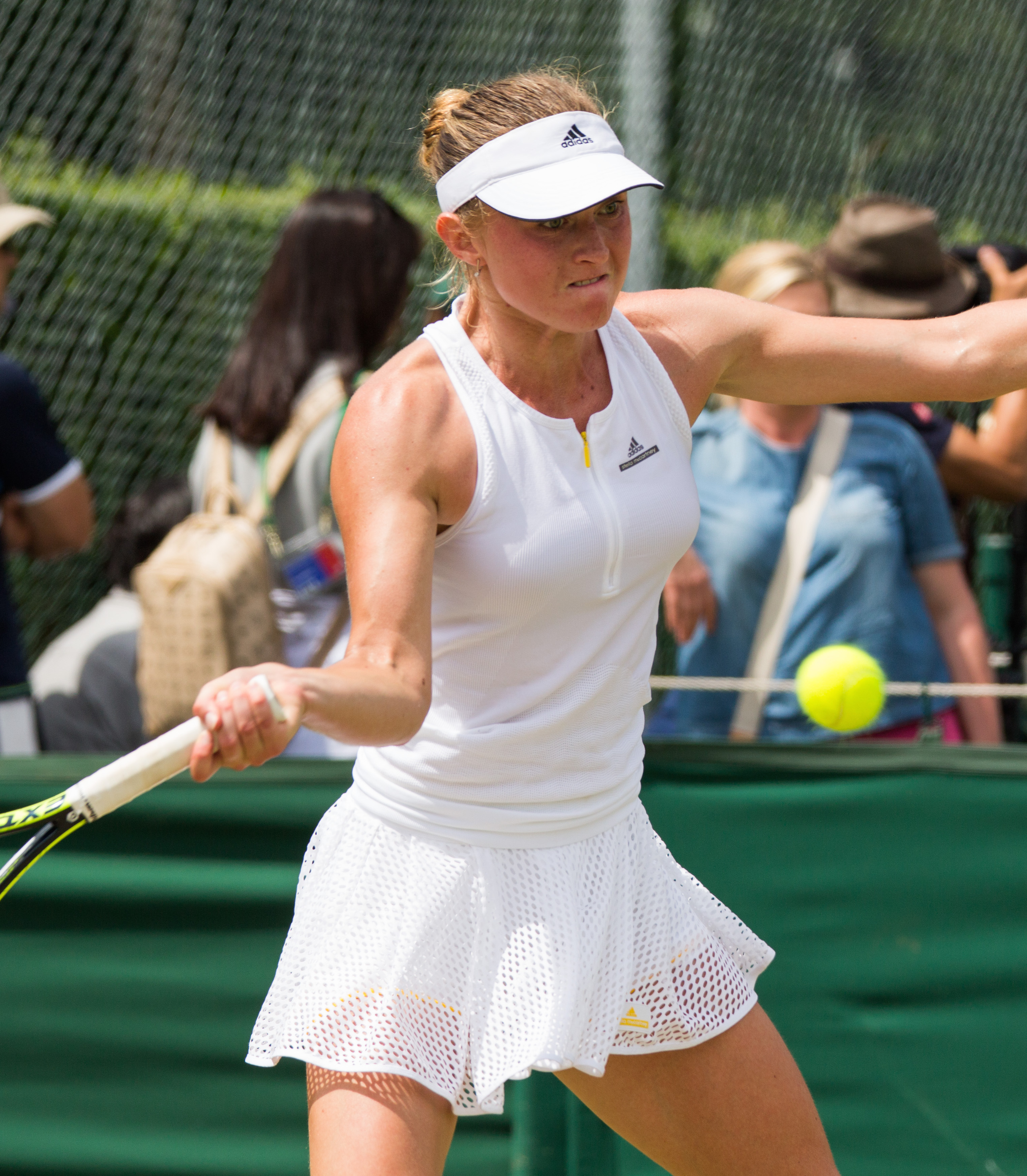
Sasnovich at the 2015 Wimbledon

Sasnovich made her ITF Women's Circuit debut at the $50k Minsk qualifying in November 2009. In October 2011, she won her first ITF singles title at Cagliari. In February 2012, she won her first ITF doubles title in Tallinn. In October 2013, she won the $100k Internationaux de Poitiers, defeating Sofia Arvidsson in the final. The following week, she won the $50k Open de Nantes, defeating Magda Linette in the final. At the 2013 Brussels Open, she made her WTA Tour debut in doubles, while her singles debut was at the 2014 US Open. In September 2015, she reached her first tour singles final at the Korea Open but lost to Irina-Camelia Begu. At the Premier-level Pan Pacific Open in 2016, she recorded her first top-10 win, defeating world No. 6, Karolína Plíšková, and reached the quarterfinals where she lost to Naomi Osaka. In the first half of 2017, she reached the quarterfinal of the Hungarian Ladies Open and the semifinal of the Open Biel/Bienne. In October 2017, she reached the quarterfinal of the Premier-level Kremlin Cup but lost to Daria Kasatkina.

=== 2018: Most successful season, major fourth round, top 30 debut ===
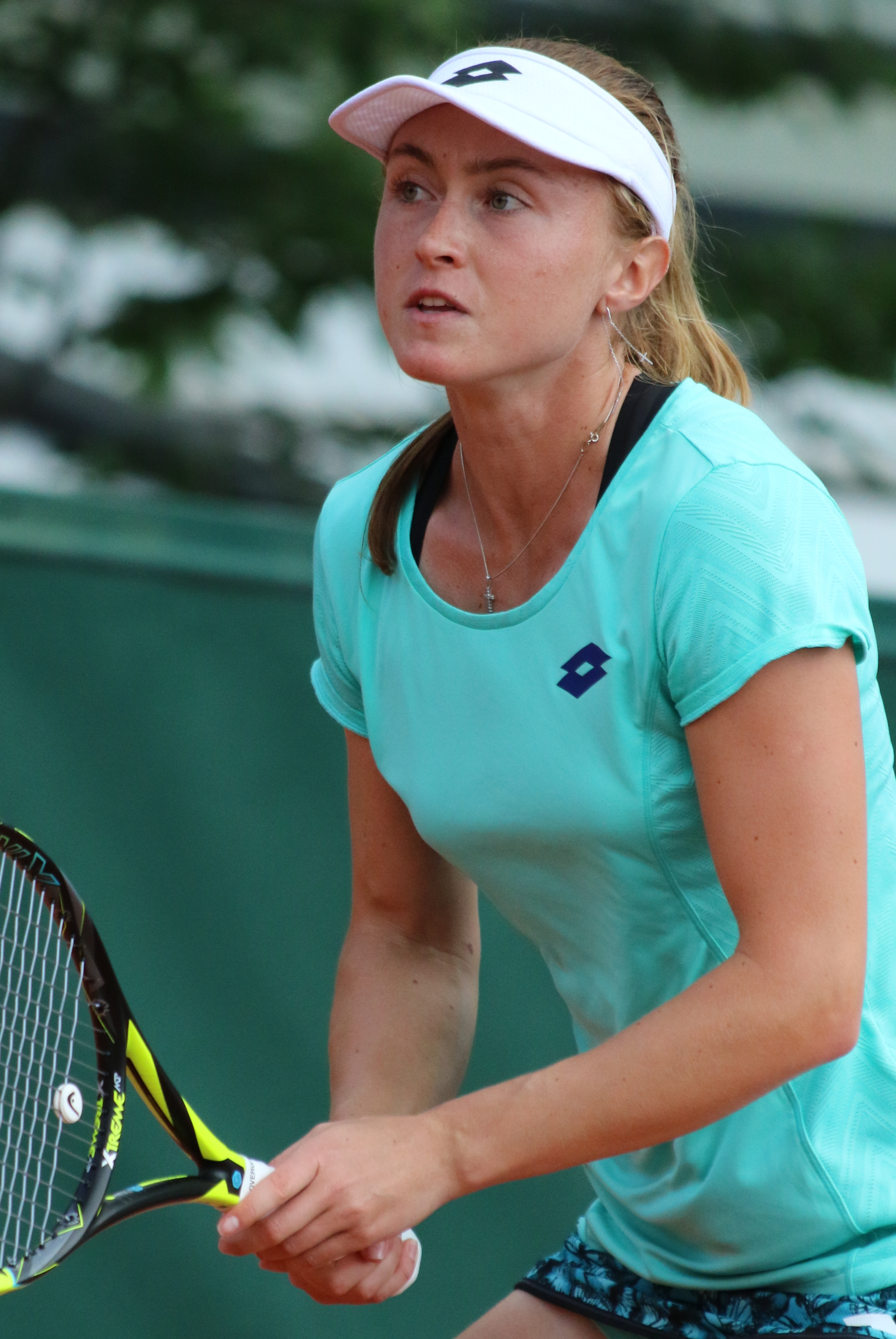
Sasnovich at the 2018 French Open

Sasnovich started the season well, reaching her first Premier final at the Brisbane International, where she lost against the third seed Elina Svitolina.

At the Australian Open, she won against Christina McHale and Mirjana Lučić-Baroni before she was stopped in the third round by eighth seed Caroline Garcia. At the Indian Wells Open, she also reached the third round, where she lost to Caroline Wozniacki. She reached the second round of the Miami Open, Madrid Open and French Open.

She then reached fourth round of Wimbledon, her best major tournament run to date, including a win over the two-time Wimbledon champion Petra Kvitová. She followed this with wins over Taylor Townsend and Daria Gavrilova, before she lost to former Wimbledon semifinalist Jeļena Ostapenko. At the Moscow River Cup, she reached the semifinals, where she lost to the eventual champion Olga Danilović.

At the US Open, she defeated the world No. 11, Daria Kasatkina, to reach the third round, but then lost to eventual champion Naomi Osaka with a double bagel. She finished the year with a quarterfinal at the Kremlin Cup after registering a top-10 win over Kiki Bertens in the second round, losing to Johanna Konta.

=== 2019: US Open doubles semifinal ===
In the first week of the year, Sasnovich had a top-10 win over Elina Svitolina, and reached the quarterfinal, where she lost to Donna Vekić. The following week, she had another top-10 win over world No. 10, Daria Kasatkina, and reached the semifinal of the Sydney International, where she lost to Petra Kvitová. At the Australian Open, she reached her second consecutive third round there, this time losing to Anastasia Pavlyuchenkova. At the Madrid Open, she defeated world No. 15, Anett Kontaveit, in the first round, but later lost to world No. 1 Naomi Osaka in the third round. She finished year at the Open de Limoges, a WTA Challenger event, losing to Ekaterina Alexandrova in the final. In doubles, she reached the third round of the Australian Open, the quarterfinal of the Italian Open, and then she reached her first major semifinal at the US Open. There, alongside Viktória Kužmová, she lost to the pairing of Victoria Azarenka and Ashleigh Barty.

=== 2020: US Open singles third round, French Open doubles quarterfinal ===
In the first half of the year, Sasnovich did not produce any significant results. After five months of tennis absence due to the COVID-19 pandemic, she played at the Palermo Ladies Open, where she reached the quarterfinal but then lost her match to Petra Martić. At the US Open, she defeated world No. 19, Markéta Vondroušová, and reached the third round, in which she lost to Yulia Putintseva. The following week, she played at the İstanbul Cup where she reached the quarterfinals. After losing in the second round of the French Open in singles, she reached the quarterfinals in doubles, alongside Marta Kostyuk. She finished her year with a quarterfinal entry at the Linz Open.

=== 2021: Wimbledon third round, win over Serena Williams, WTA 1000 fourth round ===
Sasnovich reached the third round at Wimbledon for the second time in her career, defeating Serena Williams, who retired in the first round, and Nao Hibino in the second round.

At the Indian Wells Open, Sasnovich upset reigning US Open champion and 17th seed, Emma Raducanu, in the second round, 6–2, 6–4. She continued with upseting another Grand Slam champion and former No. 1, Simona Halep, in the following round.

=== 2022: Two WTA Tour finals, Miami & French Open fourth round ===
As a qualifier, Sasnovich reached the final of the Melbourne Summer Set 2 where she lost to Amanda Anisimova. She defeated two seeded players, Clara Tauson and Ann Li, on the way to the final. At the Australian Open, she lost to qualifier Zheng Qinwen, in the first round.

At the French Open, she defeated Emma Raducanu for the second time in eight months to advance to the third round at this major for the first time in her career thus completing the third round career set at all Grand Slam tournaments. She went one step further defeating 21st seed Angelique Kerber to reach the fourth round.

=== 2023: Hong Kong Open final ===
Having qualified into the main draw, Sasnovich defeated fifth seed and Olympic champion, Belinda Bencic, at the San Diego Open. She lost her next match to Emma Navarro.

At the Hong Kong Open, she was runner-up in the doubles with partner Oksana Kalashnikova, losing out in the final to Tsao Chia-yi and Tang Qianhui in a match tie-break. Sasnovich reached the quarterfinals at the Jiangxi Open with wins over Viktória Hrunčáková and Valeria Savinykh, before losing to Leylah Fernandez. Alongside Kamilla Rakhimova, she also made it through to the semifinals of the doubles at the same event.

=== 2024: Budapest Grand Prix final ===
Partnering with Laura Siegemund, Sasnovich reached the semifinals of the doubles at the Dubai Championships, going out to third seeds Nicole Melichar-Martinez and Ellen Perez. At the Italian Open, she defeated world No. 18 and 14th seed Ekaterina Alexandrova in the second round but went out in her next match against Angelique Kerber.

After defeating Suzan Lamens in the quarterfinals and Anna Karolína Schmiedlová in the last four, she reached the final of the Budapest Grand Prix, losing to top seed Diana Shnaider, in straight sets.

=== 2025: Cluj-Napoca semifinals in singles and doubles ===
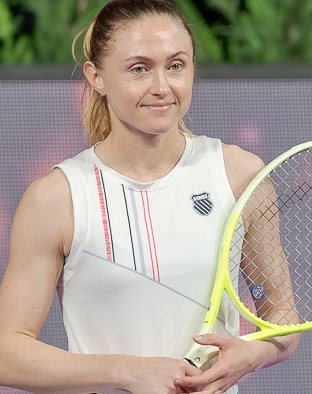
Sasnovich at the 2025 Transylvania Open against Bulgaru

Sasnovich entered the main draw at the Transylvania Open as a lucky loser, and defeated sixth seed Jéssica Bouzas Maneiro, qualifier Marina Stakusic and fourth seed Anhelina Kalinina to make it through to the semifinals, where she lost to top seed Anastasia Potapova. At the same tournament, she also reached the semifinals in doubles, partnering Katarzyna Piter.

At the China Open, Sasnovich reached the third round defeating world No. 14, Naomi Osaka, for her 24th career top-20 win, but her first in 16 months. Osaka had not lost a completed match in Beijing since 2018.

== Performance timelines ==
Key
W	F	SF	QF	#R	RR	Q#	DNQ	A	NH

(W) winner; (F) finalist; (SF) semifinalist; (QF) quarterfinalist; (#R) rounds 4, 3, 2, 1; (RR) round-robin stage; (Q#) qualification round; (DNQ) did not qualify; (A) absent; (NH) not held; (SR) strike rate (events won / competed); (W–L) win–loss record.
To avoid confusion and double counting, these charts are updated at the conclusion of a tournament or when the player's participation has ended.

Only main-draw results in WTA Tour, Grand Slam tournaments, Billie Jean King Cup, United Cup, Hopman Cup and Olympic Games are included in win–loss records.

=== Singles ===
Current through the 2026 China Open.

Tournament	2012	2013	2014	2015	2016	2017	2018	2019	2020	2021	2022	2023	2024	2025	2026	SR	W–L	Win %
Grand Slam tournaments
Australian Open	A	A	Q1	Q1	2R	1R	3R	3R	1R	1R	1R	2R	1R	Q1	1R	0 / 10	6–10	38%
French Open	A	A	Q1	Q1	1R	2R	2R	1R	2R	2R	4R	1R	Q2	Q2	Q3	0 / 8	7–8	47%
Wimbledon	A	A	Q2	2R	2R	1R	4R	1R	NH	3R	A (Note: Suspended due to the ban of Russian and Belarusian athletes in light of the Russian invasion of Ukraine.)	2R	Q2	2R	Q3	0 / 8	9–8	53%
US Open	A	A	2R	1R	1R	2R	3R	2R	3R	1R	2R	1R	1R	1R	Q2	0 / 12	8–12	40%
Win–Loss	0–0	0–0	1–1	1–2	2–4	2–4	8–4	3–4	3–3	3–4	4–3	2–4	0–2	1–2	0–1	0 / 38	30–38	44%
National representation
Billie Jean King Cup (Note: Formerly known as Fed Cup until 2020.)	WG2	Z1	POZ1	PO2	PO	F	1R	SF	RR (Note: Edition is split into the two years due to COVID-19.)		DQ					0 / 4	17–13	57%
WTA 1000 tournaments
Qatar Open	A	A	A	NTI	Q2	NTI	A	NTI	Q2	NTI	2R	NTI	Q2	A	Q1	0 / 1	1–1	50%
Dubai Championships	NTI			A	NTI	A	NTI	2R	NTI	A	NTI	2R	Q1	A	1R	0 / 3	2–3	40%
Indian Wells Open	A	A	A	A	1R	Q1	3R	2R	NH	4R	2R	2R	Q1	Q1	Q1	0 / 6	7–6	54%
Miami Open	A	A	A	A	1R	2R	2R	2R	NH	A	4R	2R	Q1	Q1	1R	0 / 7	7–7	50%
Madrid Open	A	A	A	A	Q2	Q1	2R	3R	NH	Q2	Q1	2R	Q1	1R	Q1	0 / 4	4–4	50%
Italian Open	A	A	A	A	Q2	Q1	Q1	1R	A	A	2R	2R	3R	Q1	Q1	0 / 4	4–4	50%
Canadian Open	A	A	A	Q2	A	A	A	1R	NH	A	A	A	A	A	A	0 / 1	0–1	0%
Cincinnati Open	A	A	A	Q2	Q1	1R	1R	2R	A	1R	1R	1R	Q2	Q1	Q1	0 / 6	1–6	14%
China Open	A	A	A	A	Q1	Q2	2R	1R	NH			Q1	A	3R	2R	0 / 4	4–4	50%
Wuhan Open	NH		A	A	A	Q2	2R	1R	NH				A	A	A	0 / 2	1–2	33%
Guadalajara Open	NH										1R	2R	NTI			0 / 2	1–2	33%
Win–Loss	0–0	0–0	0–0	0–0	0–2	1–2	6–6	5–9	0–0	3–2	6–6	6–7	2–1	2–2	1–3	0 / 40	32–40	44%
Career statistics
	2012	2013	2014	2015	2016	2017	2018	2019	2020	2021	2022	2023	2024	2025	2026	SR	W–L	Win %
Tournaments	0	0	3	6	13	13	20	22	9	18	19	21	9	10	5	Career total: 148		
Titles	0	0	0	0	0	0	0	0	0	0	0	0	0	0	0	Career total: 0		
Finals	0	0	0	1	0	0	1	0	0	0	2	0	1	0	0	Career total: 5		
Hard win–loss	0–2	2–1	5–4	6–5	6–7	14–10	18–14	13–15	5–6	13–15	17–11	9–13	1–4	6–6	4–6	0 / 119	119–119	50%
Clay win–loss	0–0	0–0	0–0	0–1	2–6	2–2	5–5	2–4	6–4	5–4	8–6	2–4	6–1	0–2	0–0	0 / 37	38–39	49%
Grass win–loss	0–0	0–0	0–0	1–1	1–1	1–2	3–3	0–3	0–0	2–1	2–2	6–4	0–1	1–2	0–0	0 / 17	17–20	46%
Overall win–loss	0–2	2–1	5–4	7–7	9–14	17–14	26–22	15–22	11–10	20–20	27–19	17–21	7–6	7–10	4–6	0 / 178	174–178	49%
Win %	0%	67%	56%	50%	44%	55%	54%	41%	52%	53%	59%	45%	54%	41%	40%	Career total: 49%		
Year-end ranking (Note: 2010: WTA ranking – 717, 2011: WTA ranking – 830.)	534	135	142	103	121	87	30	67	90	91	31	88	146	111		$6,929,566		

=== Doubles ===
Current through the 2023 US Open.

Tournament	2013	2014	2015	2016	2017	2018	2019	2020	2021	2022	2023	SR	W–L	Win %
Grand Slam tournaments
Australian Open	A	A	A	A	A	A	3R	3R	1R	1R	3R	0 / 5	6–5	55%
French Open	A	A	A	A	A	3R	1R	QF	1R	1R	A	0 / 5	5–5	50%
Wimbledon	A	A	A	Q1	Q1	1R	2R	NH	1R	A	1R	0 / 4	1–4	20%
US Open	A	A	A	A	A	1R	SF	1R	1R	2R	1R	0 / 6	5–6	45%
Win–Loss	0–0	0–0	0–0	0–0	0–0	2–3	7–4	5–3	0–4	1–3	2–3	0 / 20	17–20	46%
WTA 1000 tournaments
Qatar Open	A	A	NTI	A	NTI	A	NTI	A	NTI	2R	A	0 / 1	1–1	50%
Dubai Championships	NTI		A	NTI	A	NTI	A	NTI	A	NTI	2R	0 / 1	1–1	50%
Indian Wells Open	A	A	A	A	A	A	A	NH	2R	A	A	0 / 1	1–1	50%
Madrid Open	A	A	A	A	A	A	2R	NH	A	A	A	0 / 1	1–1	50%
Italian Open	A	A	A	A	A	A	QF	A	A	A	1R	0 / 2	2–2	50%
Cincinnati Open	A	A	A	A	A	A	A	A	SF	QF	1R	0 / 3	4–3	57%
China Open	A	A	A	A	A	A	1R	NH			A	0 / 1	0–1	0%
Wuhan Open	NH	A	A	A	A	A	2R	NH				0 / 1	1–1	50%
Guadalajara Open	NH									2R	A	0 / 1	1–1	50%
Career statistics
Tournaments	3	4	1	1	0	6	11	4	12	10	2	Career total: 54		
Overall win–loss	1–3	2–4	0–1	1–1	0–1	2–6	12–12	6–4	13–11	7–10	2–2	0 / 54	46–54	46%
Year-end ranking (Note: 2011: WTA ranking – 1066, 2012: WTA ranking – 300.)	160	218	329	N/A	N/A	269	46	44	76	100	81			

== WTA Tour finals ==
=== Singles: 5 (5 runner-ups) ===
Legend Premier / WTA 500 (0–1) International / WTA 250 (0–4)	Finals by surface Hard (0–4) Clay (0–1)	Finals by setting Outdoor (0–5)

Result	W–L	Date	Tournament	Tier	Surface	Opponent	Score
Loss	0–1	Sep 2015	Korea Open, South Korea	International	Hard	(Romania) Irina-Camelia Begu	3–6, 1–6
Loss	0–2	Jan 2018	Brisbane International, Australia	Premier	Hard	(Ukraine) Elina Svitolina	2–6, 1–6
Loss	0–3	Jan 2022	Melbourne Summer Set, Australia	WTA 250	Hard	(United States) Amanda Anisimova	5–7, 6–1, 4–6
Loss	0–4	Aug 2022	Tennis in Cleveland, US	WTA 250	Hard	Liudmila Samsonova	1–6, 3–6
Loss	0–5	Jul 2024	Budapest Grand Prix, Hungary	WTA 250	Clay	Diana Shnaider	4–6, 4–6

=== Doubles: 1 (runner-up) ===
Legend WTA 250 (0–1)	Finals by surface Hard (0–1)

Result	Date	Tournament	Tier	Surface	Partner	Opponents	Score
Loss	Oct 2023	Hong Kong Open, China SAR	WTA 250	Hard	(Georgia (country)) Oksana Kalashnikova	(China) Tang Qianhui (Chinese Taipei) Tsao Chia-yi	5–7, 6–1, [9–11]

== WTA 125 finals ==
=== Singles: 1 (runner-up) ===
Result	Date	Tournament	Surface	Opponent	Score
Loss	Dec 2019	Open de Limoges, France	Hard (i)	(Russia) Ekaterina Alexandrova	1–6, 3–6

=== Doubles: 1 (runner-up) ===
Result	W–L	Date	Tournament	Surface	Partner	Opponents	Score
Loss	0–1	Oct 2026	Suzhou Ladies Open, China	Hard	Tatiana Prozorova	(Chinese Taipei) Li Yu-yun (China) Zhang Ying	3–6, 0–6

== ITF Circuit finals ==
=== Singles: 11 (11 titles) ===
Legend 100k tournaments (1–0) 50k tournaments (1–0) 25k tournaments (4–0) 10k tournaments (5–0)	Finals by surface Hard (7–0) Clay (4–0)

Result	W–L	Date	Tournament	Tier	Surface	Opponent	Score
Win	1–0	Oct 2011	ITF Cagliari, Italy	10k	Clay	(Germany) Anne Schäfer	6–4, 6–3
Win	2–0	Apr 2012	ITF Pomezia, Italy	10k	Clay	(Romania) Raluca Olaru	0–6, 6–1, 6–1
Win	3–0	Aug 2012	ITF St. Petersburg, Russia	10k	Clay	(Russia) Polina Vinogradova	1–6, 6–3, 6–0
Win	4–0	Nov 2012	ITF Minsk, Belarus	25k	Hard (i)	(Ukraine) Lyudmyla Kichenok	6–0, 7–6^{(7–4)}
Win	5–0	Mar 2013	ITF Netanya, Israel	10k	Hard	(France) Amandine Hesse	6–2, 7–5
Win	6–0	Mar 2013	ITF Netanya, Israel	10k	Hard	(Russia) Polina Vinogradova	6–3, 3–6, 6–4
Win	7–0	Mar 2013	ITF Tallinn, Estonia	25k	Hard (i)	(Ukraine) Nadiia Kichenok	7–6^{(7–3)}, 6–2
Win	8–0	Oct 2013	Internationaux de Poitiers, France	100k	Hard (i)	(Sweden) Sofia Arvidsson	6–1, 5–7, 6–4
Win	9–0	Oct 2013	Open Nantes Atlantique, France	50k+H	Hard (i)	(Poland) Magda Linette	4–6, 6–4, 6–2
Win	10–0	Feb 2014	ITF Moscow, Russia	25k	Hard (i)	(Estonia) Anett Kontaveit	6–3, 6–2
Win	11–0	Jun 2014	Internazionali di Brescia, Italy	25k	Clay	(Czech Republic) Renata Voráčová	6–4, 6–1

=== Doubles: 9 (7 titles, 2 runner-ups) ===
Legend 75k tournaments (0–2) 50k tournaments (1–0) 25k tournaments (3–0) 10k tournaments (3–0)	Finals by surface Hard (6–2) Clay (1–0)

Result	W–L	Date	Tournament	Tier	Surface	Partner	Opponents	Score
Win	1–0	Feb 2012	ITF Tallinn, Estonia	10k	Hard (i)	(France) Lou Brouleau	(Russia) Olga Kalyuzhnaya (Netherlands) Jaimy-Gayle van de Wal	6–3, 6–2
Loss	1–1	Oct 2012	GB Pro-Series Barnstaple, UK	75k	Hard (i)	(Latvia) Diāna Marcinkēviča	(Uzbekistan) Akgul Amanmuradova (Serbia) Vesna Dolonc	3–6, 1–6
Win	2–1	Nov 2012	ITF Minsk, Belarus	25k	Hard (i)	(Belarus) Ekaterina Dzehalevich	(Ukraine) Lyudmyla Kichenok (Ukraine) Nadiia Kichenok	1–6, 6–2, [10–3]
Loss	2–2	Jan 2013	ITF Eilat, Israel	75k	Hard	(Italy) Corinna Dentoni	(Russia) Alla Kudryavtseva (Ukraine) Elina Svitolina	1–6, 3–6
Win	3–2	Mar 2013	ITF Netanya, Israel	10k	Hard	(Russia) Polina Leykina	(Russia) Natela Dzalamidze (Russia) Aminat Kushkhova	2–6, 7–6^{(4)}, [10–8]
Win	4–2	Mar 2013	ITF Netanya, Israel	10k	Hard	(Russia) Polina Monova	(China) Lu Jiajing (China) Lu Jiaxiang	6–1, 6–2
Win	5–2	Apr 2013	Chiasso Open, Switzerland	25k	Clay	(Latvia) Diāna Marcinkēviča	(Italy) Nicole Clerico (Italy) Giulia Gatto-Monticone	6–7^{(2)}, 6–4, [10–7]
Win	6–2	Nov 2013	ITF Minsk, Belarus	25k	Hard (i)	(Belarus) Ilona Kremen	(Kazakhstan) Anna Danilina (Russia) Olga Doroshina	7–6^{(3)}, 6–0
Win	7–2	Feb 2015	Neva Cup St. Petersburg, Russia	50k	Hard (i)	(Switzerland) Viktorija Golubic	(France) Stéphanie Foretz (Croatia) Ana Vrljić	6–4, 7–5

== Fed Cup participation ==
Legend
World Group / Finals (8–5)
World Group Play-off / Qual. Round (4–4)
World Group 2 (3–0)
World Group 2 Play-off (0–3)
Europe/Africa Group (10–4)

=== Singles (17–13) ===
Edition	Round	Date	Location	Against	Surface	Opponent	W/L	Score
2012	WG2 PO	21 Apr 2012	Yverdon-les-Bains (SUI)	Switzerland	Hard (i)	Stefanie Vögele	L	0–6, 7–5, 3–6
2012	WG2 PO	22 Apr 2012	Yverdon-les-Bains (SUI)	Switzerland	Hard (i)	Timea Bacsinszky	L	2–6, 6–3, 1–6
2013	Z1 RR	6 Feb 2013	Eilat (ISR)	(Georgia (country)) Georgia	Hard	Margalita Chakhnashvili	W	6–3, 6–2
2013	Z1 RR	7 Feb 2013	Eilat (ISR)	Austria	Hard	Patricia Mayr-Achleitner	W	6–3, 4–6, 6–4
2013	Z1 RR	8 Feb 2013	Eilat (ISR)	Croatia	Hard	Ana Konjuh	L	7–6^{(3)}, 4–6, 2–6
2014	Z1 RR	4 Feb 2014	Budapest (HUN)	Turkey	Hard (i)	Pemra Özgen	W	6–4, 6–3
2014	Z1 RR	6 Feb 2014	Budapest (HUN)	Portugal	Hard (i)	Maria João Koehler	W	6–3, 6–4
2014	Z1 RR	7 Feb 2014	Budapest (HUN)	Bulgaria	Hard (i)	Borislava Botusharova	W	6–1, 6–3
2014	Z1 PO	9 Feb 2014	Budapest (HUN)	Netherlands	Hard (i)	Richèl Hogenkamp	L	3–6, 4–6
2015	Z1 RR	4 Feb 2015	Budapest (HUN)	(Georgia (country)) Georgia	Hard (i)	Sofia Shapatava	W	6–1, 4–6, 7–5
2015	Z1 RR	6 Feb 2015	Budapest (HUN)	Portugal	Hard (i)	Michelle Larcher de Brito	L	4–6, 2–6
2015	WG2 PO	19 Apr 2015	Tokyo (JPN)	Japan	Hard (i)	Ayumi Morita	L	6–7^{(5)}, 6–4, 4–6
2016	WG2	6 Feb 2016	Quebec City (CAN)	Canada	Hard (i)	Françoise Abanda	W	6–4, 2–6, 6–3
2016	WG2	7 Feb 2016	Quebec City (CAN)	Canada	Hard (i)	Aleksandra Wozniak	W	6–4, 6–4
2016	WG PO	16 Apr 2016	Moscow (RUS)	Russia	Clay (i)	Daria Kasatkina	L	3–6, 6–3, 1–6
2016	WG PO	17 Apr 2016	Moscow (RUS)	Russia	Clay (i)	Margarita Gasparyan	W	4–6, 6–1, 7–5
2017	WG QF	11 Feb 2017	Minsk (BLR)	Netherlands	Hard (i)	Michaëlla Krajicek	W	4–6, 6–3, 6–2
2017	WG QF	12 Feb 2017	Minsk (BLR)	Netherlands	Hard (i)	Kiki Bertens	W	6–3, 6–4,
2017	WG SF	22 Apr 2017	Minsk (BLR)	Switzerland	Hard (i)	Viktorija Golubic	W	6–3, 5–7, 7–5
2017	WG SF	23 Apr 2017	Minsk (BLR)	Switzerland	Hard (i)	Timea Bacsinszky	W	6–2, 7–6^{(2)}
2017	WG F	11 Nov 2017	Minsk (BLR)	United States	Hard (i)	CoCo Vandeweghe	L	4–6, 4–6
2017	WG F	12 Nov 2017	Minsk (BLR)	United States	Hard (i)	Sloane Stephens	W	4–6, 6–1, 8–6
2018	WG QF	10 Feb 2018	Minsk (BLR)	Germany	Hard (i)	Antonia Lottner	L	5–7, 4–6
2018	WG PO	21 Apr 2018	Minsk (BLR)	Slovakia	Hard (i)	Jana Čepelová	W	7–6^{(6)}, 7–5
2018	WG PO	22 Apr 2018	Minsk (BLR)	Slovakia	Hard (i)	Viktória Kužmová	L	1–6, 6–7^{(3–7)}
2019	WG QF	9 Feb 2019	Braunschweig (GER)	Germany	Hard (i)	Tatjana Maria	W	7–6^{(3)}, 6–3
2020–21	F QR	7 Feb 2020	The Hague (NED)	Netherlands	Clay (i)	Kiki Bertens	L	7–6^{(6)}, 2–6, 1–6
2020–21	F QR	7 Feb 2020	The Hague (NED)	Netherlands	Clay (i)	Arantxa Rus	W	0–6, 7–5, 6–2
2020–21	F RR	1 Nov 2021	Prague (CZE)	Belgium	Hard (i)	Elise Mertens	L	2–6, 6–4, 2–6
2020–21	F RR	4 Nov 2021	Prague (CZE)	Australia	Hard (i)	Ajla Tomljanović	L	6–4, 2–6, 3–6

=== Doubles (8–3) ===
Edition	Round	Date	Location	Against	Surface	Partner	Opponents	W/L	Score
2012	WG2 PO	22 Apr 2012	Yverdon-les-Bains (SUI)	Switzerland	Hard (i)	Darya Lebesheva	Belinda Bencic; Amra Sadiković	L	7–6^{(8–5)}, 6–7^{(7–9)}, 5–7
2013	Z1 RR	6 Feb 2013	Eilat (ISR)	(Georgia (country)) Georgia	Hard	Lidziya Marozava	Ekaterine Gorgodze; Sofia Kvatsabaia	W	6–2, 6–2
2013	Z1 RR	8 Feb 2013	Eilat (ISR)	Croatia	Hard	Lidziya Marozava	Darija Jurak; Tereza Mrdeža	L	6–7^{(2)}, 3–6
2015	Z1 RR	4 Feb 2015	Budapest (HUN)	(Georgia (country)) Georgia	Hard (i)	Vera Lapko	Oksana Kalashnikova; Sofia Shapatava	W	6–3, 6–4
2015	Z1 RR	5 Feb 2015	Budapest (HUN)	Bulgaria	Hard (i)	Vera Lapko	Dia Evtimova; Viktoriya Tomova	W	7–5, 6–1
2015	Z1 RR	6 Feb 2015	Budapest (HUN)	Portugal	Hard (i)	Vera Lapko	Bárbara Luz; Inês Murta	W	6–4, 6–7^{(2)}, 6–2
2016	WG2	7 Feb 2016	Quebec City (CAN)	Canada	Hard (i)	Olga Govortsova	Gabriela Dabrowski; Carol Zhao	W	6–2, 6–4
2017	WG F	12 Nov 2017	Minsk (BLR)	United States	Hard (i)	Aryna Sabalenka	Shelby Rogers; CoCo Vandeweghe	L	3–6, 6–7^{(3)}
2020–21	F QR	7 Feb 2020	The Hague (NED)	Netherlands	Clay (i)	Aryna Sabalenka	Kiki Bertens; Demi Schuurs	W	4–6, 6–3, 7–6^{(8)}
2020–21	F RR	1 Nov 2021	Prague (CZE)	Belgium	Hard (i)	Vera Lapko	Kirsten Flipkens; Elise Mertens	W	6–4, 6–3
2020–21	F RR	4 Nov 2021	Prague (CZE)	Australia	Hard (i)	Lidziya Marozava	Olivia Gadecki; Ellen Perez	W	6–4, 6–4

== WTA Tour career earnings ==
Current through the 2022 French Open

Year	Grand Slam singles titles	WTA singles titles	Total singles titles	Earnings ($)	Money list rank
2014	0	0	0	113,326	166
2015	0	0	0	213,150	133
2016	0	0	0	291,438	105
2017	0	0	0	351,018	104
2018	0	0	0	1,007,650	38
2019	0	0	0	818,446	47
2020	0	0	0	443,563	48
2021	0	0	0	645,574	51
2022	0	0	0	793,574	50
2023	0	0	0	681,943	70
2024	0	0	0	441,584	126
2025	0	0	0	506,163	116
2026	0	0	0		
Career	0	0	0	6,886,951	128

== Best Grand Slam results details ==
=== Singles ===
Australian Open
2018 Australian Open
Round	Opponent	Rank	Score	ASR
1R	(United States) Christina McHale	No. 73	6–3, 6–2	No. 56
2R	(Croatia) Mirjana Lučić-Baroni (28)	No. 30	6–3, 6–1	No. 56
3R	(France) Caroline Garcia (8)	No. 8	3–6, 7–5, 2–6	No. 56
2019 Australian Open
Round	Opponent	Rank	Score	ASR
1R	(Belgium) Kirsten Flipkens	No. 50	6–1, 6–1	No. 31
2R	(Estonia) Anett Kontaveit (20)	No. 20	6–3, 6–3	No. 31
3R	(Russia) Anastasia Pavlyuchenkova	No. 44	0–6, 3–6	No. 31

Wimbledon Championships
2018 Wimbledon
Round	Opponent	Rank	Score	ASR
1R	(Czech Republic) Petra Kvitová (8)	No. 7	6–4, 4–6, 6–0	No. 50
2R	(United States) Taylor Townsend	No. 73	6–0, 6–4	No. 50
3R	(Australia) Daria Gavrilova (26)	No. 25	6–3, 6–1	No. 50
4R	(Latvia) Jeļena Ostapenko (12)	No. 12	6–7^{(4–7)}, 0–6	No. 50

French Open
2022 French Open
Round	Opponent	Rank	Score	ASR
1R	(China) Wang Xinyu	No. 77	6–4, 6–1	No. 47
2R	(United Kingdom) Emma Raducanu (12)	No. 12	3–6, 6–1, 6–1	No. 47
3R	(Germany) Angelique Kerber (21)	No. 17	6–4, 7–6^{(7–5)}	No. 47
4R	(Italy) Martina Trevisan	No. 59	6–7^{(10–12)}, 5–7	No. 47

US Open
2018 US Open
Round	Opponent	Rank	Score	ASR
1R	(Switzerland) Belinda Bencic	No. 38	2–6, 6–1, 6–2	No. 33
2R	(Russia) Daria Kasatkina (11)	No. 11	6–2, 7–6^{(7–3)}	No. 33
3R	(Japan) Naomi Osaka (20)	No. 19	0–6, 0–6	No. 33
2020 US Open
Round	Opponent	Rank	Score	ASR
1R	(United States) Francesca Di Lorenzo	No. 129	2–6, 7–6^{(8–6)}, 6–0	No. 106
2R	(Czech Republic) Markéta Vondroušová (12)	No. 19	6–1, 6–2	No. 106
3R	(Kazakhstan) Yulia Putintseva (23)	No. 35	6–2, 2–6, 1–6	No. 106

== Wins against top 10 players ==
No.	Player	Rk	Event	Surface	Rd	Score	Rk	Years	Ref
1	(Czech Republic) Karolína Plíšková	6	Pan Pacific Open, Japan	Hard	2R	6–4, 6–2	107	2016	
2	(Czech Republic) Petra Kvitová	7	Wimbledon, United Kingdom	Grass	1R	6–4, 4–6, 6–0	50	2018	
3	(Netherlands) Kiki Bertens	10	Kremlin Cup, Russia	Hard (i)	2R	6–3, 4–6, 6–3	31	2018	
4	(Ukraine) Elina Svitolina	4	Brisbane International, Australia	Hard	2R	6–4, 0–6, 6–3	30	2019	
5	(Russia) Daria Kasatkina	10	Sydney International, Australia	Hard	1R	6–1, 6–4	33	2019	
6	(United States) Serena Williams	8	Wimbledon, United Kingdom	Grass	1R	3–3 ret.	100	2021	

- Key: (Rk) first use, opponent rank; (Rd) round; (Rk) 2nd use, player rank; (Ref) reference; (F) final; (SF) semifinal; (QF) quarterfinal; (#R) rounds 4, 3, 2, 1; (RR) round-robin stage; (Q#) qualifying rounds or stages (3), 2, 1.
