= 2018 Zagreb Ladies Open =

Professional tennis tournament

- Date: 3–9 September
- Edition: 8th
- Category: ITF Women's Circuit
- Prize money: $60,000
- Surface: Clay
- Location: Zagreb, Croatia

Champions

Singles
- (Croatia) Tereza Mrdeža

Doubles
- (Venezuela) Andrea Gámiz / (Venezuela) Aymet Uzcátegui
← 2011 ·	Zagreb Ladies Open	· 2019 →

The 2018 Zagreb Ladies Open was a professional tennis tournament played on outdoor clay courts. It was the eighth edition of the tournament and was part of the 2018 ITF Women's Circuit. It took place in Zagreb, Croatia, on 3–9 September 2018.

== Singles main draw entrants ==
=== Seeds ===
Country	Player	Rank^{1}	Seed
UZB	Sabina Sharipova	123	1
BUL	Viktoriya Tomova	142	2
ESP	Georgina García Pérez	154	3
GRE	Valentini Grammatikopoulou	169	4
BUL	Elitsa Kostova	179	5
ITA	Martina Di Giuseppe	185	6
SVK	Jana Čepelová	213	7
CRO	Tereza Mrdeža	232	8

- ^{1} Rankings as of 27 August 2018.

=== Other entrants ===
The following players received a wildcard into the singles main draw:

- (Croatia) Lea Bošković
- (Bosnia and Herzegovina) Anita Husarić
- (Serbia) Bojana Jovanovski Petrović
- (Croatia) Silvia Njirić

The following players received entry using a protected ranking:

- (North Macedonia) Lina Gjorcheska
- (Russia) Alexandra Panova

The following players received entry from the qualifying draw:

- (Hungary) Ágnes Bukta
- (Sweden) Cornelia Lister
- (Italy) Angelica Moratelli
- (Argentina) Paula Ormaechea

== Champions ==
=== Singles ===
- (Croatia) Tereza Mrdeža def. (Argentina) Paula Ormaechea, 2–6, 6–4, 7–5

=== Doubles ===
- (Venezuela) Andrea Gámiz / (Venezuela) Aymet Uzcátegui def. (Romania) Elena Bogdan / (Romania) Alexandra Cadanțu, 6–3, 6–4
