= 2013 Fed Cup Europe/Africa Zone Group I – Pool D =

Group D of the 2013 Fed Cup Europe/Africa Zone Group I was one of four pools in the Europe/Africa zone of the 2013 Fed Cup. Four teams competed in a round robin competition, with the top team and the bottom team proceeding to their respective sections of the play-offs: the top team played for advancement to the World Group II Play-offs, while the bottom team faced potential relegation to Group II.

== Standings ==
		(Slovenia) SLO	(Netherlands) NED	(Bulgaria) BUL	(Luxembourg) LUX	RR; W–L	Match; W–L	Set; W–L	Game; W–L	Standings
22	Slovenia		0–3	0–3	2–1	1–2	2–7	5–13	58–84	3
30	Netherlands	3–0		0–3	3–0	2–1	6–3	11–7	87–70	2
39	Bulgaria	3–0	3–0		3–0	3–0	9–0	18–1	102–42	1
54	Luxembourg	1–2	0–3	0–3		0–3	1–8	3–16	58–109	4

== Round-robin ==
=== Slovenia vs. Luxembourg ===
Slovenia
2
Municipal Tennis Club, Eilat, Israel
7 February 2013
Hard (outdoors)

Luxembourg
1

			1	2	3
1	(Slovenia) (Luxembourg)	Tjaša Šrimpf; Claudine Schaul	3; 6	3; 6
2	(Slovenia) (Luxembourg)	Andreja Klepač; Anne Kremer	6; 4	6^{5} 7^{7}	6; 3
3	(Slovenia) (Luxembourg)	Andreja Klepač / Tjaša Šrimpf; Anne Kremer / Claudine Schaul	7; 5	6; 0

=== Netherlands vs. Bulgaria ===
Netherlands
0
Municipal Tennis Club, Eilat, Israel
7 February 2013
Hard (outdoors)

Bulgaria
3

			1	2	3
1	(Netherlands) (Bulgaria)	Richèl Hogenkamp; Dia Evtimova	6; 4	4; 6	2; 6
2	(Netherlands) (Bulgaria)	Arantxa Rus; Tsvetana Pironkova	1; 6	2; 6
3	(Netherlands) (Bulgaria)	Arantxa Rus / Bibiane Schoofs; Isabella Shinikova / Elitsa Kostova	2; 6	6^{5} 7^{7}

=== Slovenia vs. Netherlands ===
Slovenia
0
Municipal Tennis Club, Eilat, Israel
8 February 2013
Hard (outdoors)

Netherlands
3

			1	2	3
1	(Slovenia) (Netherlands)	Tjaša Šrimpf; Richèl Hogenkamp	2; 6	0; 6
2	(Slovenia) (Netherlands)	Andreja Klepač; Arantxa Rus	6; 4	3; 6	4; 6
3	(Slovenia) (Netherlands)	Andreja Klepač / Tjaša Šrimpf; Arantxa Rus / Bibiane Schoofs				w/o

=== Bulgaria vs. Luxembourg ===
Bulgaria
3
Municipal Tennis Club, Eilat, Israel
8 February 2013
Hard (outdoors)

Luxembourg
0

			1	2	3
1	(Bulgaria) (Luxembourg)	Elitsa Kostova; Laura Correia	6; 1	6; 3
2	(Bulgaria) (Luxembourg)	Tsvetana Pironkova; Anne Kremer	6; 1	6; 4
3	(Bulgaria) (Luxembourg)	Dia Evtimova / Isabella Shinikova; Laura Correia / Tiffany Cornelius	6; 2	6; 2

=== Slovenia vs. Bulgaria ===
Slovenia
0
Municipal Tennis Club, Eilat, Israel
9 February 2013
Hard (outdoors)

Bulgaria
3

			1	2	3
1	(Slovenia) (Bulgaria)	Tina Rupert; Dia Evtimova	1; 6	0; 6
2	(Slovenia) (Bulgaria)	Tjaša Šrimpf; Tsvetana Pironkova	0; 1			retired
3	(Slovenia) (Bulgaria)	Tina Rupert / Andreja Klepač; Elitsa Kostova / Isabella Shinikova	2; 6	3; 6

=== Luxembourg vs. Netherlands ===
Netherlands
3
Municipal Tennis Club, Eilat, Israel
9 February 2013
Hard (outdoors)

Luxembourg
0

			1	2	3
1	(Netherlands) (Luxembourg)	Richèl Hogenkamp; Tiffany Cornelius	6; 2	6; 3
2	(Netherlands) (Luxembourg)	Arantxa Rus; Anne Kremer	6; 2	6; 2
3	(Netherlands) (Luxembourg)	Bibiane Schoofs / Angelique van der Meet; Anne Kremer / Claudine Schaul	6; 2	6; 3

== See also ==
- Fed Cup structure
