= Julija Gotovskytė =

Lithuanian tennis player (born 1988)

- Country (sports): Lithuania
- Born: 20 January 1988 (age 37)
- Plays: Right-handed (two-handed backhand)
- Prize money: $3,834

Singles
- Career record: 15–23
- Highest ranking: 759 (19 June 2006)

Grand Slam singles results
- Australian Open Junior: 3R (2019)
- French Open Junior: 1R (2018, 2019)
- Wimbledon Junior: 1R (2018, 2019)
- US Open Junior: 2R (2018, 2019)

Doubles
- Career record: 4–10
- Highest ranking: 884 (22 May 2006)

Grand Slam doubles results
- Australian Open Junior: W (2019)
- French Open Junior: SF (2019)
- Wimbledon Junior: 2R (2019)
- US Open Junior: SF (2019)

Team competitions
- Fed Cup: 0–7

Julija Gotovskytė (born 20 January 1988) is a Lithuanian tennis player.

Gotovskytė has a career high WTA singles ranking of 759, achieved on 19 June 2006. She also has a career high WTA doubles ranking of 884, achieved on 22 May 2006.

== ITF junior finals ==
Grand Slam
Category GA
Category G1
Category G2
Category G3
Category G4
Category G5

=== Singles (1–0) ===
Outcome	No.	Date	Tournament	Grade	Surface	Opponent	Score
Winner	1.	6 March 2005	Šiauliai, Lithuania	G4	Carpet (i)	(Russia) Yulia Solonitskaya	w/o

=== Doubles (1–2) ===
Outcome	No.	Date	Tournament	Grade	Surface	Partner	Opponents	Score
Runner-up	1.	30 August 2002	Kaunas, Lithuania	G5	Clay	(Lithuania) Irina Cybina	(Lithuania) Ana Gotovskytė (Lithuania) Monika Pečiulionytė	2–6, 3–6
Runner-up	2.	1 August 2003	Kaunas, Lithuania	G5	Clay	(Lithuania) Irina Cybina	(Lithuania) Ana Gotovskytė (Lithuania) Eglė Petrauskaitė	6–7^{(2–7)}, 7–6^{(7–4)}, 5–7
Winner	3.	6 March 2005	Šiauliai, Lithuania	G4	Carpet (i)	(Lithuania) Irina Cybina	(Russia) Yulia Solonitskaya (Ukraine) Ksenia Tokareva	w/o

== National representation ==
=== Fed Cup ===
Gotovskytė made her Fed Cup debut for Lithuania in 2007, while the team was competing in the Europe/Africa Zone Group I.

==== Fed Cup (0–7) ====
Group membership World Group (0–0) World Group Play-off (0–0) World Group II (0–0) World Group II Play-off (0–0) Europe/Africa Group (0–7)	Matches by surface Hard (0–0) Clay (0–7) Grass (0–0) Carpet (0–0)	Matches by type Singles (0–4) Doubles (0–3)	Matches by setting Indoors (0–0) Outdoors (0–7)

==== Singles (0–4) ====
Edition	Stage	Date	Location	Against	Surface	Opponent	W/L	Score
2007 Fed Cup; Europe/Africa Zone Group I	Pool B	18 April 2007	Plovdiv, Bulgaria	Ukraine	Clay	Yuliana Fedak	L	1–6, 1–6
2007 Fed Cup; Europe/Africa Zone Group I	Pool B	19 April 2007	Plovdiv, Bulgaria	Belarus	Clay	Ksenia Milevskaya	L	4–6, 2–6
2007 Fed Cup; Europe/Africa Zone Group I	Pool B	20 April 2007	Plovdiv, Bulgaria	Hungary	Clay	Zsófia Gubacsi	L	0–6, 1–6
2007 Fed Cup; Europe/Africa Zone Group I	Relegation playoff	21 April 2007	Plovdiv, Bulgaria	Bulgaria	Clay	Dia Evtimova	L	1–6, 0–3 ret.

==== Doubles (0–3) ====
Edition	Stage	Date	Location	Against	Surface	Partner	Opponents	W/L	Score
2007 Fed Cup; Europe/Africa Zone Group I	Pool B	18 April 2007	Plovdiv, Bulgaria	Ukraine	Clay	Lina Stančiūtė	Kateryna Bondarenko; Olga Savchuk	L	1–6, 1–6
2007 Fed Cup; Europe/Africa Zone Group I	Pool B	19 April 2007	Plovdiv, Bulgaria	Belarus	Clay	Lina Stančiūtė	Tatiana Poutchek; Anastasiya Yakimova	L	0–6, 1–6
2007 Fed Cup; Europe/Africa Zone Group I	Pool B	20 April 2007	Plovdiv, Bulgaria	Hungary	Clay	Lina Stančiūtė	Zsófia Gubacsi; Ágnes Szávay	L	7–5, 3–6, 1–6
