= 2011 Zagreb Ladies Open – Singles =

Singles
- 2011 Zagreb Ladies Open

Final
- Champion: (Bulgaria) Dia Evtimova
- Runner-up: (Russia) Anastasia Pivovarova
- Score: 6–2, 6–2

Events
Singles	Doubles
← 2010 ·	Zagreb Ladies Open	· 2018 →

Renata Voráčová was the defending champion, but chose not to participate.

Dia Evtimova won the title by defeating Anastasia Pivovarova in the final 6–2, 6–2.

== Seeds ==
1. (Germany) Kristina Barrois (quarterfinals)
2. (Russia) Anastasia Pivovarova (final)
3. (Belgium) Kirsten Flipkens (second round)
4. (Italy) Corinna Dentoni (quarterfinals)
5. (United States) Julia Cohen (first round)
6. (Argentina) Florencia Molinero (second round)
7. (Bulgaria) Dia Evtimova (champion)
8. (Romania) Mihaela Buzărnescu (semifinals)

== Main draw ==
=== Key ===
- Q = Qualifier
- WC = Wild card
- LL = Lucky loser
- Alt = Alternate
- ITF = ITF entry
- PR = Protected ranking
- SR = Special ranking
- SE = Special exempt
- JE = Junior exempt
- JR = Junior Accelerator Programme entrant
- CO = College Accelerator Programme entrant
- NG = Next Gen Accelerator Program entrant
- w/o = Walkover
- r = Retired
- d = Defaulted

=== Finals ===
Semifinals
(Netherlands) Bibiane Schoofs	3	3
7	(Bulgaria) Dia Evtimova	6	6
8	(Romania) Mihaela Buzărnescu	6^{5}	6	4
2	(Russia) Anastasia Pivovarova	7^{7}	0	6

Final
7	(Bulgaria) Dia Evtimova	6	6
2	(Russia) Anastasia Pivovarova	2	2

=== Top half ===
First round
1	(Germany) K Barrois	6	6
(Poland) J Jegiołka	2	1
(Croatia) D Banoveć	4	3
(Italy) A Bona	6	6
(Portugal) MJ Koehler	6	6
WC	(Germany) S Vorih	0	2
(Netherlands) B Schoofs	7^{7}	6
5	(United States) J Cohen	6^{4}	1
3	(Belgium) K Flipkens	6	6
WC	(Germany) M Frlicka	0	2
Q	(Croatia) P Šunić	0	6^{3}
SR	(Hungary) K Marosi	6	7^{7}
WC	(Slovakia) M Staníková	3	4
Q	(Italy) N Clerico	6	6
(Argentina) P Ormaechea	2	4
7	(Bulgaria) D Evtimova	6	6

Second round
1	(Germany) K Barrois	6	4	6
(Italy) A Bona	4	6	4
(Portugal) MJ Koehler	6	6^{5}	3
(Netherlands) B Schoofs	3	7^{7}	6
3	(Belgium) K Flipkens	6^{5}	5
SR	(Hungary) K Marosi	7^{7}	7
Q	(Italy) N Clerico	5	0
7	(Bulgaria) D Evtimova	7	6

Quarterfinals
1	(Germany) K Barrois	1	3
(Netherlands) B Schoofs	6	6
SR	(Hungary) K Marosi	2	4
7	(Bulgaria) D Evtimova	6	6

Semifinals
(Netherlands) B Schoofs	3	3
7	(Bulgaria) D Evtimova	6	6

=== Bottom half ===
First round
8	(Romania) M Buzărnescu	6	6
WC	(Croatia) S Njirić	3	1
(Serbia) D Erić	3	3
(France) S Beltrame	6	6
(Croatia) A Vrljić	3	3
(Slovakia) L Juríková	6	6
(France) A Bergot	2	6	0
4	(Italy) C Dentoni	6	4	6
6	(Argentina) F Molinero	6	6
Q	(Slovenia) A Prislan	1	4
Q	(Croatia) I Akiki	4	5
(Croatia) A Mijačika	6	7
(Ukraine) K Kozlova	6	7^{7}
(Slovenia) N Kolar	4	6^{2}
(Czech Republic) Z Zálabská	4	2
2	(Russia) A Pivovarova	6	6

Second round
8	(Romania) M Buzărnescu	6	5	6
(France) S Beltrame	4	7	2
(Slovakia) L Juríková	5	2
4	(Italy) C Dentoni	7	6
6	(Argentina) F Molinero	4	2
(Croatia) A Mijačika	6	6
(Ukraine) K Kozlova	4	7	0
2	(Russia) A Pivovarova	6	5	6

Quarterfinals
8	(Romania) M Buzărnescu	6	6
4	(Italy) C Dentoni	0	1
(Croatia) A Mijačika	4	6	4
2	(Russia) A Pivovarova	6	4	6

Semifinals
8	(Romania) M Buzărnescu	6^{5}	6	4
2	(Russia) A Pivovarova	7^{7}	0	6
