= 2007 Fed Cup Europe/Africa Zone Group I – Pool B =

Group B of the 2007 Fed Cup Europe/Africa Zone Group I

Group B of the 2007 Fed Cup Europe/Africa Zone Group I was one of four pools in the Europe/Africa Zone Group I of the 2007 Fed Cup. Four teams competed in a round robin competition, with the top team and the bottom team proceeding to their respective sections of the play-offs: the top team played for advancement to the World Group II Play-offs, while the bottom team faced potential relegation to Group II.

		(Belarus) BLR	(Ukraine) UKR	(Hungary) HUN	(Lithuania) LTU	RR; W–L	Set; W–L	Game; W–L	Standings
23	Belarus		0–3	2–1	2–1	2–1	10–12	104–103	2
26	Ukraine	3–0		2–1	3–0	3–0	17–5	127–84	1
39	Hungary	1–2	1–2		2–1	1–2	12–12	121–119	3
49	Lithuania	1–2	0–3	1–2		0–3	5–15	64–100	4

== Belarus vs. Hungary ==
Belarus
2
TC Lokomotiv, Plovdiv, Bulgaria
18 April 2007
Red clay (outdoors)

Hungary
1

			1	2	3
1	(Belarus) (Hungary)	Anastasiya Yakimova; Ágnes Szávay	4; 6	4; 6
2	(Belarus) (Hungary)	Victoria Azarenka; Kira Nagy	6; 0	6^{3} 7^{7}	6; 3
3	(Belarus) (Hungary)	Ksenia Milevskaya / Tatiana Poutchek; Zsófia Gubacsi / Ágnes Szávay	6; 3	4; 6	9; 7

== Ukraine vs. Lithuania ==
Ukraine
3
TC Lokomotiv, Plovdiv, Bulgaria
18 April 2007
Red clay (outdoors)

Lithuania
0

			1	2	3
1	(Ukraine) (Lithuania)	Yuliana Fedak; Julija Gotovskytė	6; 1	6; 1
2	(Ukraine) (Lithuania)	Alona Bondarenko; Lina Stančiūtė	7; 5	7; 5
3	(Ukraine) (Lithuania)	Kateryna Bondarenko / Olga Savchuk; Julija Gotovskytė / Lina Stančiūtė	6; 1	6; 1

== Belarus vs. Lithuania ==
Belarus
2
TC Lokomotiv, Plovdiv, Bulgaria
19 April 2007
Red clay (outdoors)

Lithuania
1

			1	2	3
1	(Belarus) (Lithuania)	Ksenia Milevskaya; Julija Gotovskytė	6; 4	6; 2
2	(Belarus) (Lithuania)	Tatiana Poutchek; Lina Stančiūtė	1; 6	1; 6
3	(Belarus) (Lithuania)	Tatiana Poutchek / Anastasiya Yakimova; Julija Gotovskytė / Lina Stančiūtė	6; 0	6; 1

== Ukraine vs. Hungary ==
Ukraine
2
TC Lokomotiv, Plovdiv, Bulgaria
19 April 2007
Red clay (outdoors)

Hungary
1

			1	2	3
1	(Ukraine) (Hungary)	Kateryna Bondarenko; Ágnes Szávay	6; 4	3; 6	5; 7
2	(Ukraine) (Hungary)	Yuliana Fedak; Kira Nagy	6; 4	6; 2
3	(Ukraine) (Hungary)	Alona Bondarenko / Kateryna Bondarenko; Zsófia Gubacsi / Ágnes Szávay	6; 2	3; 6	8; 6

== Belarus vs. Ukraine ==
Belarus
0
TC Lokomotiv, Plovdiv, Bulgaria
20 April 2007
Red clay (outdoors)

Ukraine
3

			1	2	3
1	(Belarus) (Ukraine)	Anastasiya Yakimova; Yuliana Fedak	2; 6	2; 6
2	(Belarus) (Ukraine)	Victoria Azarenka; Alona Bondarenko	6; 2	5; 7	1; 6
3	(Belarus) (Ukraine)	Ksenia Milevskaya / Anastasiya Yakimova; Kateryna Bondarenko / Olga Savchuk	5; 7	7; 5	5; 7

== Hungary vs. Lithuania ==
Hungary
2
TC Lokomotiv, Plovdiv, Bulgaria
20 April 2007
Red clay (outdoors)

Lithuania
1

			1	2	3
1	(Hungary) (Lithuania)	Zsófia Gubacsi; Julija Gotovskytė	6; 0	6; 1
2	(Hungary) (Lithuania)	Kira Nagy; Lina Stančiūtė	4; 6	6; 4	7; 9
3	(Hungary) (Lithuania)	Zsófia Gubacsi / Ágnes Szávay; Julija Gotovskytė / Lina Stančiūtė	5; 7	6; 3	6; 1

== See also ==
- Fed Cup structure
