= 2019 Zagreb Ladies Open =

- Date: 2–8 September 2019
- Edition: 9th
- Category: ITF Women's World Tennis Tour
- Prize money: $60,000+H
- Surface: Clay
- Location: Zagreb, Croatia

Champions

Singles
- (Ukraine) Maryna Chernyshova

Doubles
- (Hungary) Anna Bondár / (Argentina) Paula Ormaechea
← 2018 ·	Zagreb Ladies Open	· 2020 →

The 2019 Zagreb Ladies Open was a professional tennis tournament played on outdoor clay courts. It was the ninth edition of the tournament which was part of the 2019 ITF Women's World Tennis Tour. It took place in Zagreb, Croatia between 2 and 8 September 2019.

== Singles main-draw entrants ==
=== Seeds ===
Country	Player	Rank^{1}	Seed
AUT	Barbara Haas	146	1
SVK	Rebecca Šramková	172	2
ARG	Paula Ormaechea	176	3
ITA	Martina Di Giuseppe	181	4
TUR	Pemra Özgen	182	5
CRO	Tereza Mrdeža	185	6
ROU	Irina Bara	191	7
ITA	Martina Trevisan	193	8

- ^{1} Rankings are as of 26 August 2019.

=== Other entrants ===
The following players received wildcards into the singles main draw:

- (Croatia) Lea Bošković
- (Serbia) Mihaela Đaković
- (Croatia) Silvia Njirić
- (Croatia) Antonia Ružić

The following player received entry as a special exempt:

- (Croatia) Tena Lukas

The following players received entry from the qualifying draw:

- (France) Estelle Cascino
- (Ukraine) Maryna Chernyshova
- (Russia) Alena Fomina
- (Bosnia and Herzegovina) Dea Herdželaš
- (Hungary) Réka Luca Jani
- (Russia) Victoria Kan
- (Greece) Despina Papamichail
- (Slovenia) Nina Potočnik

== Champions ==
=== Singles ===
- (Ukraine) Maryna Chernyshova def. (Hungary) Réka Luca Jani, 6–1, 6–4

=== Doubles ===
- (Hungary) Anna Bondár / (Argentina) Paula Ormaechea def. (France) Amandine Hesse / (Chile) Daniela Seguel, 7–5, 7–5
