= Tjaša Šrimpf =

Slovenian tennis player

- Country (sports): Slovenia
- Born: 29 July 1994 (age 30); Maribor, Slovenia
- Plays: Right-handed
- Prize money: $10,813

Singles
- Career record: 43–38
- Career titles: 1 ITF
- Highest ranking: No. 630 (30 September 2013)

Doubles
- Career record: 13–15
- Career titles: 0
- Highest ranking: No. 866 (7 October 2013)

Team competitions
- Fed Cup: 1–3

Tjaša Šrimpf (born 29 July 1994) is a former tennis player from Slovenia.

In her career, she won one singles title on the ITF Women's Circuit. In 2013, she reached her best singles ranking of world No. 630 and peaked at No. 866 in the doubles rankings.

In February 2013, Šrimpf made her debut for the Slovenia Fed Cup team, playing in four rubbers of the Europe/Africa Group I. She won a doubles match against Luxembourg, but lost all three of her round-robin singles ties. In the first game of her match against Bulgaria's Tsvetana Pironkova, she had to retire injured.

Her last match on the ITF Women's Circuit she has been playing in a tournament in Antalya in February 2014.

== ITF finals ==
=== Singles (1–1) ===
Legend $25,000 tournaments $10,000 tournaments	Finals by surface Hard (0–0) Clay (1–1)

Outcome	Date	Tournament	Surface	Opponent	Score
Winner	21 August 2011	Brčko, Bosnia and Herzegovina	Clay	(Croatia) Tena Lukas	6–3, 6–3
Runner-up	8 April 2012	Šibenik, Croatia	Clay	(Croatia) Indire Akiki	5–7, 2–6

=== Doubles (0–1) ===
Legend $25,000 tournaments $10,000 tournaments	Finals by surface Hard (0–0) Clay (0–1)

Outcome	Date	Tournament	Surface	Partner	Opponents	Score
Runner-up	22 June 2013	Niš, Serbia	Clay	(Bosnia and Herzegovina) Nerma Ćaluk	(Australia) Viktorija Rajicic (Bulgaria) Viktoriya Tomova	1–6, 2–6

== Fed Cup participation ==
=== Singles ===
Edition	Stage	Date	Location	Against	Surface	Opponent	W/L	Score
2013 Fed Cup; Europe/Africa Zone Group I	R/R	7 February 2013	Eilat, Israel	Luxembourg	Hard	(Luxembourg) Claudine Schaul	L	3–6, 3–6
2013 Fed Cup; Europe/Africa Zone Group I	R/R	8 February 2013	Eilat, Israel	Netherlands	Hard	(Netherlands) Richèl Hogenkamp	L	2–6, 0–6
2013 Fed Cup; Europe/Africa Zone Group I	R/R	9 February 2013	Eilat, Israel	Bulgaria	Hard	(Bulgaria) Tsvetana Pironkova	L	0–1 ret.

=== Doubles ===
Edition	Stage	Date	Location	Against	Surface	Partner	Opponents	W/L	Score
2013 Fed Cup; Europe/Africa Zone Group I	R/R	7 February 2013	Eilat, Israel	Luxembourg	Hard	(Slovenia) Andreja Klepač	(Luxembourg) Anne Kremer (Luxembourg) Claudine Schaul	W	7–5, 6–0
