= Maryna Chernyshova =

Ukrainian tennis player

- Full name: Maryna Vitaliyivna Chernyshova
- Native name: Марина Віталіївна Чернишова
- Country (sports): Ukraine
- Born: 25 June 1999 (age 26)
- Plays: Right (two-handed backhand)
- Prize money: $58,415

Singles
- Career record: 140–70
- Career titles: 9 ITF
- Highest ranking: No. 280 (9 September 2019)

Doubles
- Career record: 70–42
- Career titles: 9 ITF
- Highest ranking: No. 371 (14 May 2018)

Maryna Vitaliyivna Chernyshova (Ukrainian: Марина Віталіївна Чернишова; born 25 June 1999) is a Ukrainian former tennis player.

== Career ==
Chernyshova has career-high WTA rankings of 280 in singles, achieved September 2019, and 371 in doubles, which she reached on 14 May 2018.

She won her biggest ITF title at the 2019 Zagreb Ladies Open by beating Réka Luca Jani in the final, in straight sets.

Soon after that she did not compete at tournaments until a short comeback in March 2022, for only four ITF events.

== ITF finals ==
Legend
$60,000 tournaments
$25,000 tournaments
$15,000 tournaments
$10,000 tournaments

=== Singles: 12 (9 titles, 3 runner-ups) ===
Result	W–L	Date	Tournament	Tier	Surface	Opponent	Score
Win	1–0	Apr 2017	ITF Shymkent, Kazakhstan	15,000	Clay	(Russia) Anastasia Pribylova	6–3, 6–3
Loss	1–1	Jul 2017	ITF Prokuplje, Serbia	15,000	Clay	(Greece) Despina Papamichail	6–3, 6–7^{(5)}, 3–6
Win	2–1	Aug 2017	ITF Ivano-Frankivsk, Ukraine	15,000	Clay	(Switzerland) Karin Kennel	6–4, 3–6, 6–0
Win	3–1	Nov 2017	ITF Antalya, Turkey	15,000	Clay	(Bulgaria) Dia Evtimova	3–6, 7–5, 6–0
Win	4–1	Dec 2017	ITF Antalya, Turkey	15,000	Clay	(Russia) Amina Anshba	6–4, 6–4
Win	5–1	Dec 2017	ITF Antalya, Turkey	15,000	Clay	(Russia) Alina Silich	6–0, 6–7^{(8)}, 6–1
Win	6–1	Sep 2018	ITF Almaty, Kazakhstan	15,000	Clay	(Russia) Daria Lodikova	6–4, 6–3
Loss	6–2	Sep 2018	ITF Shymkent, Kazakhstan	15,000	Clay	(Kyrgyzstan) Ksenia Palkina	0–1 ret.
Win	7–2	Feb 2019	ITF Antalya, Turkey	15,000	Clay	(Japan) Yuki Naito	7–6^{(3)}, 2–6, 6–2
Win	8–2	Mar 2019	ITF Antalya, Turkey	15,000	Clay	(Luxembourg) Eléonora Molinaro	6–4, 6–4
Loss	8–3	Mar 2019	ITF Antalya, Turkey	15,000	Clay	(Ukraine) Viktoriia Dema	6–4, 2–6, 1–6
Win	9–3	Sep 2019	Zagreb Ladies Open, Croatia	60,000+H	Clay	(Hungary) Réka Luca Jani	6–1, 6–4

=== Doubles: 15 (9 titles, 6 runner-ups) ===
Result	W–L	Date	Tournament	Tier	Surface	Partner	Opponents	Score
Loss	0–1	Dec 2016	ITF Antalya, Turkey	10,000	Clay	(Russia) Anna Ukolova	(Bosnia and Herzegovina) Ema Burgić Bucko (Norway) Ulrikke Eikeri	4–6, 1–6
Win	1–1	May 2017	ITF Antalya, Turkey	15,000	Clay	(Ukraine) Kateryna Sliusar	(Germany) Tayisiya Morderger (Germany) Yana Morderger	6–2, 7–6^{(0)}
Win	2–1	Jul 2017	ITF Prokuplje, Serbia	15,000	Clay	(Russia) Daria Lodikova	(United States) Natalie Suk (Czech Republic) Kateřina Vaňková	3–6, 6–4, [10–4]
Win	3–1	Aug 2017	ITF Ivano-Frankivsk, Ukraine	15,000	Clay	(Ukraine) Veronika Kapshay	(Romania) Elena-Teodora Cadar (Ukraine) Oleksandra Korashvili	4–6, 6–2, [11–9]
Loss	3–2	Sep 2017	ITF Bucha, Ukraine	15,000	Clay	(Ukraine) Kateryna Sliusar	(Italy) Martina Colmegna (Italy) Michele Alexandra Zmău	4–6, 3–6
Win	4–2	Nov 2017	ITF Antalya, Turkey	15,000	Clay	(Belarus) Sviatlana Pirazhenka	(Bulgaria) Dia Evtimova (Hungary) Réka Luca Jani	6–4, 6–1
Win	5–2	Dec 2017	ITF Antalya, Turkey	15,000	Clay	(Russia) Alina Silich	(Greece) Eleni Kordolaimi (Bosnia and Herzegovina) Jasmina Tinjić	6–3, 6–7^{(3)}, [10–8]
Win	6–2	Apr 2018	Nana Trophy, Tunisia	25,000	Clay	(Australia) Seone Mendez	(Russia) Amina Anshba (Italy) Anastasia Grymalska	7–6^{(5)}, 6–4
Loss	6–3	Apr 2018	ITF Hammamet, Tunisia	15,000	Clay	(Romania) Oana Gavrilă	(Russia) Amina Anshba (Russia) Maria Marfutina	6–4, 2–6, [10–12]
Loss	6–4	Jun 2018	ITF Antalya, Turkey	15,000	Clay	(Turkey) Melis Sezer	(Bulgaria) Dia Evtimova (Russia) Angelina Zhuravleva	5–7, 6–3, [12–14]
Win	7–4	Jul 2018	ITF Knokke, Belgium	15,000	Clay	(Russia) Anna Ukolova	(Argentina) Melina Ferrero (Argentina) Sofía Luini	1–6, 6–1, [10–8]
Win	8–4	Sep 2018	ITF Almaty, Kazakhstan	15,000	Clay	(Israel) Vlada Ekshibarova	(Uzbekistan) Albina Khabibulina (Kyrgyzstan) Ksenia Palkina	7–6^{(3)}, 6–2
Loss	8–5	Feb 2019	ITF Antalya, Turkey	15,000	Clay	(Israel) Vlada Ekshibarova	(Turkey) Cemre Anil (Romania) Oana Georgeta Simion	2–6, 4–6
Loss	8–6	Jul 2019	ITF Bytom, Poland	25,000	Clay	(Russia) Daria Lodikova	(Hungary) Dalma Gálfi (Poland) Katarzyna Piter	4–6, 0–6
Win	9–6	Sep 2019	ITF Brno, Czech Republic	25,000	Clay	(Slovakia) Chantal Škamlová	(Poland) Anna Hertel (Slovakia) Vivien Juhászová	6–7^{(4)}, 6–4, [10–4]
