= 2018 Zagreb Ladies Open – Doubles =

Doubles
- 2018 Zagreb Ladies Open

Final
- Champions: (Venezuela) Andrea Gámiz (Venezuela) Aymet Uzcátegui
- Runners-up: (Romania) Elena Bogdan (Romania) Alexandra Cadanțu
- Score: 6–3, 6–4

Events
Singles	Doubles
- Zagreb Ladies Open

Maria João Koehler and Katalin Marosi were the defending champions, having won the previous event in 2011, but neither player chose to participate.

Andrea Gámiz and Aymet Uzcátegui won the title, defeating Elena Bogdan and Alexandra Cadanțu in the final, 6–3, 6–4.

== Seeds ==
1. (Sweden) Cornelia Lister / (Belgium) An-Sophie Mestach (first round)
2. (Czech Republic) Petra Krejsová / (Czech Republic) Jesika Malečková (quarterfinals)
3. (Russia) Olga Doroshina / (Russia) Alexandra Panova (first round)
4. (Russia) Alena Fomina / (Russia) Ekaterina Yashina (quarterfinals)

== Draw ==
Key

- Q = Qualifier
- WC = Wild card
- LL = Lucky loser
- Alt = Alternate
- ITF = ITF entry
- PR = Protected ranking
- SR = Special ranking
- SE = Special exempt
- JE = Junior exempt
- JR = Junior Accelerator Programme entrant
- CO = College Accelerator Programme entrant
- NG = Next Gen Accelerator Program entrant
- w/o = Walkover
- r = Retired
- d = Defaulted

=== Draw ===
First round
1	(Sweden) C Lister (Belgium) A-S Mestach	2	2
(Greece) V Grammatikopoulou (United States) I Neel	6	6
(Slovakia) M Hončová (Uzbekistan) S Sharipova	2	2
(Spain) G García Pérez (Argentina) P Ormaechea	6	6
4	(Russia) A Fomina (Russia) E Yashina	3	6	[10]
WC	(North Macedonia) L Gjorcheska (Croatia) I Primorac	6	4	[4]
WC	(France) M Georges (Croatia) S Njirić	5	6^{8}
(Venezuela) A Gámiz (Venezuela) A Uzcátegui	7	7^{10}
(Romania) E Bogdan (Romania) A Cadanțu	7	6
WC	(Bosnia and Herzegovina) A Husarić (Turkey) P Özgen	5	1
(Hungary) Á Bukta (Hungary) P Udvardy	6	6
3	(Russia) O Doroshina (Russia) A Panova	4	1
(Hungary) D Gálfi (Hungary) RL Jani	6	6
(Belarus) S Pirazhenka (Bulgaria) J Terziyska	1	3
(Italy) A Grymalska (Belarus) I Kremen	6	4	[3]
2	(Czech Republic) P Krejsová (Czech Republic) J Malečková	3	6	[10]

Quarterfinals
(Greece) V Grammatikopoulou (United States) I Neel	7^{7}	5	[10]
(Spain) G García Pérez (Argentina) P Ormaechea	6^{4}	7	[8]
4	(Russia) A Fomina (Russia) E Yashina	2	5
(Venezuela) A Gámiz (Venezuela) A Uzcátegui	6	7
(Romania) E Bogdan (Romania) A Cadanțu	3	6	[10]
(Hungary) Á Bukta (Hungary) P Udvardy	6	2	[7]
(Hungary) D Gálfi (Hungary) RL Jani	6	6
2	(Czech Republic) P Krejsová (Czech Republic) J Malečková	3	0

Semifinals
(Greece) V Grammatikopoulou (United States) I Neel
(Venezuela) A Gámiz (Venezuela) A Uzcátegui	w/o
(Romania) E Bogdan (Romania) A Cadanțu	4	6	[10]
(Hungary) D Gálfi (Hungary) RL Jani	6	3	[6]

Final
(Venezuela) A Gámiz (Venezuela) A Uzcátegui	6	6
(Romania) E Bogdan (Romania) A Cadanțu	3	4
