= Dia Evtimova =

Bulgarian tennis player

Dia Evtimova Диа Евтимова
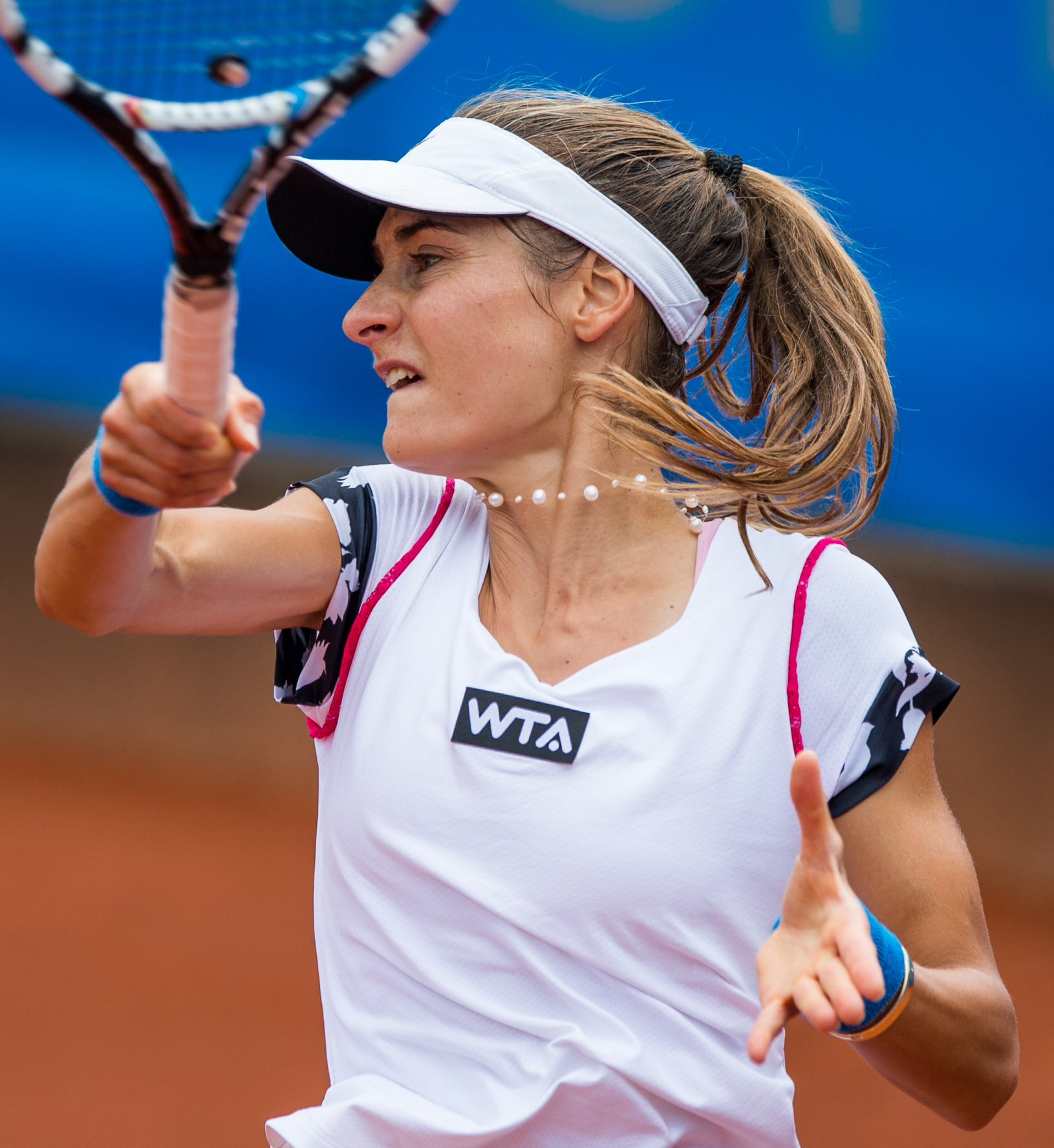
- At the Nürnberger Versicherungscup, 2014
- Country (sports): Bulgaria
- Residence: Haskovo, Bulgaria
- Born: 30 April 1987 (age 39) Sofia, People's Republic of Bulgaria
- Height: 1.68 m (5 ft 6 in)
- Turned pro: 2005
- Plays: Right (two-handed backhand)
- Prize money: $306,710

Singles
- Career record: 637–569
- Career titles: 10 ITF
- Highest ranking: No. 145 (31 October 2011)
- Current ranking: No. 1238 (19 January 2026)

Grand Slam singles results
- Australian Open: Q1 (2012)
- French Open: Q1 (2012)
- Wimbledon: Q1 (2012)
- US Open: Q3 (2012)

Doubles
- Career record: 267–217
- Career titles: 20 ITF
- Highest ranking: No. 228 (23 June 2014)
- Current ranking: No. 870 (19 January 2026)

Team competitions
- Fed Cup: 15–21 (singles 7–13; doubles 8–8)
- Last updated on: 22 January 2026.

Dia Evtimova (Bulgarian: Диа Евтимова; born 30 April 1987) is a Bulgarian tennis player. She reached a career-high WTA singles ranking of world No. 145 on 31 October 2011 and a doubles ranking of No. 228 on 23 June 2014.

She has more than 600 match wins on the ITF circuit which puts her in the top 50 on the List of Open Era, and sixth among the active players, as of January 2026. Evtimova also played for Bulgarian Fed Cup team, with a 15–21 record.

== Career ==
In 2010, she qualified for the Internationaux de Strasbourg where she was defeated by Maria Sharapova in the second round.

In 2011, she qualified for the Gastein Ladies and reached her first quarterfinal on the WTA Tour, before she was defeated by Patricia Mayr-Achleitner.

== ITF Circuit finals ==
=== Singles: 26 (10 titles, 16 runner–ups) ===
Legend $50,000 tournaments $25,000 tournaments $10/15,000 tournaments	Finals by surface Hard (2–0) Clay (8–15) Carpet (0–1)

Result	W–L	Date	Tournament	Tier	Surface	Opponent	Score
Loss	0–1	Aug 2005	ITF Maribor, Slovenia	10,000	Clay	(Sweden) Mari Andersson	5–7, 3–6
Loss	0–2	Oct 2005	ITF Volos, Greece	10,000	Carpet	(Austria) Patricia Mayr-Achleitner	4–6, 6–7^{(5)}
Loss	0–3	Jun 2006	ITF Rousse, Bulgaria	10,000	Clay	(Bulgaria) Maria Penkova	7–5, 4–6, 1–6
Win	1–3	Jun 2006	ITF Haskovo, Bulgaria	10,000	Clay	(Greece) Anna Gerasimou	6–4, 6–7^{(5)}, 6–3
Loss	1–4	Aug 2006	ITF Maribor, Slovenia	10,000	Clay	(Slovenia) Andreja Klepač	4–6, 6–2, 3–6
Win	2–4	Sep 2006	ITF Palić, Serbia and Montenegro	10,000	Clay	(Czech Republic) Iveta Gerlová	6–0, 6–4
Loss	2–5	Oct 2006	Royal Cup, Montenegro	25,000	Clay	(Serbia and Montenegro) Ana Veselinović	4–6, 5–7
Loss	2–6	Jul 2007	ITF Bucharest, Romania	25,000	Clay	(Germany) Julia Görges	0–6, 1–6
Loss	2–7	Mar 2009	ITF Rome, Italy	10,000	Clay	(Poland) Karolina Kosińska	2–6, 6–3, 4–6
Loss	2–8	Jul 2009	ITF Bucharest, Romania	10,000	Clay	(Romania) Elena Bogdan	3–6, 1–6
Win	3–8	Sep 2009	ITF Sandanski, Bulgaria	10,000	Clay	(Bulgaria) Tanya Germanlieva	6–3, 6–0
Loss	3–9	Oct 2009	ITF Dobrich, Bulgaria	10,000	Clay	(Romania) Simona Matei	2–6, 3–6
Loss	3–10	Oct 2009	ITF Madrid, Spain	50,000	Clay	(Italy) Anna Floris	1–6, 3–6
Win	4–10	Feb 2011	ITF Antalya, Turkey	10,000	Clay	(France) Marion Gaud	6–3, 6–4
Win	5–10	Jul 2011	ITF Ystad, Sweden	25,000	Clay	(Slovakia) Jana Čepelová	6–3, 6–4
Win	6–10	Sep 2011	Zagreb Ladies Open, Croatia	50,000	Clay	(Russia) Anastasia Pivovarova	6–2, 6–2
Loss	6–11	May 2013	ITF Indian Harbour Beach, United States	50,000	Clay	(Slovenia) Petra Rampre	0–6, 1–6
Win	7–11	Oct 2013	ITF Burgas, Bulgaria	10,000	Clay	(Bulgaria) Viktoriya Tomova	6–1, 6–2
Loss	7–12	Jul 2015	ITF Torino, Italy	25,000	Clay	(France) Alizé Lim	6–3, 4–6, 4–6
Loss	7–13	Dec 2016	ITF Antalya, Turkey	10,000	Clay	(Germany) Tayisiya Morderger	5–7, 1–6
Win	8–13	Feb 2017	ITF Antalya, Turkey	15,000	Clay	(Russia) Valentina Ivakhnenko	w/o
Loss	8–14	Nov 2017	ITF Antalya, Turkey	15,000	Clay	(Russia) Ekaterina Vishnevskaya	3–6, 6–0, 5–7
Loss	8–15	Nov 2017	ITF Antalya, Turkey	15,000	Clay	(Ukraine) Maryna Chernyshova	6–3, 5–7, 0–6
Loss	8–16	Jun 2018	ITF Antalya, Turkey	15,000	Clay	(Italy) Federica Bilardo	1–6, 6–4, 1–6
Win	9–16	Oct 2018	ITF Herzlia, Israel	15,000	Hard	(Israel) Tamara Barad Itzhaki	6–0, 6–3
Win	10–16	Oct 2018	ITF Ofakim, Israel	15,000	Hard	(Russia) Anastasia Pribylova	6–4, 3–6, 7–6^{(6)}

=== Doubles: 36 (20 titles, 16 runner–ups) ===
Legend $25,000 tournaments $10/15,000 tournaments	Finals by surface Hard (4–2) Clay (16–14)

Result	W–L	Date	Tournament	Tier	Surface	Partner	Opponents	Score
Win	1–0	Jun 2006	ITF Rousse, Bulgaria	10,000	Clay	(Norway) Karoline Borgersen	(Bulgaria) Biljana Pawlowa-Dimitrova (Bulgaria) Nadejda Vassileva	6–0, 6–0
Loss	1–1	Jun 2006	ITF Haskovo, Bulgaria	10,000	Clay	(Italy) Nicole Clerico	(Portugal) Rita Esteves de Freitas (Serbia and Montenegro) Neda Kozić	4–6, 4–6
Win	2–1	Jul 2006	ITF Horb, Germany	10,000	Clay	(Croatia) Josipa Bek	(Germany) Julia Görges (Germany) Lydia Steinbach	3–6, 6–3, 6–3
Loss	2–2	Aug 2006	ITF Maribor, Slovenia	10,000	Clay	(Slovenia) Maša Zec Peškirič	(Romania) Diana Enache (Romania) Antonia Xenia Tout	w/o
Loss	2–3	Sep 2009	ITF Rousse, Bulgaria	10,000	Clay	(Denmark) Malou Ejdesgaard	(Romania) Ioana Ivan (Romania) Simona Matei	1–6, 4–6
Loss	2–4	Jun 2013	ITF Périgueux, France	25,000	Clay	(Netherlands) Anna Katalina; Alzate Esmurzaeva	(Slovakia) Michaela Hončová (France) Laura Thorpe	6–7^{(3)}, 1–6
Loss	2–5	Jul 2013	ITF Denain, France	25,000	Clay	(Romania) Laura Ioana Andrei	(Argentina) Tatiana Búa (Spain) Arabela Fernández Rabener	5–7, 2–6
Win	3–5	Jul 2013	ITF Istanbul, Turkey	10,000	Hard	(Turkey) Melis Sezer	(Ukraine) Khristina Kazimova (Ukraine) Vladyslava Zanosiyenko	7–5, 6–3
Win	4–5	Sep 2013	Allianz Cup, Bulgaria	25,000	Clay	(Bulgaria) Viktoriya Tomova	(Spain) Beatriz García Vidagany (Hungary) Réka Luca Jani	6–4, 2–6, [10–6]
Win	5–5	Oct 2013	ITF Burgas, Bulgaria	10,000	Clay	(Bulgaria) Viktoriya Tomova	(Italy) Federica Arcidiacono (Bulgaria) Julia Terziyska	6–4, 6–3
Loss	5–6	Dec 2013	ITF Mérida, Mexico	25,000	Hard	(United States) Hsu Chieh-yu	(Serbia) Barbara Bonić (Sweden) Hilda Melander	3–6, 5–7
Loss	5–7	Apr 2014	ITF Pelham, United States	25,000	Clay	(Belarus) Ilona Kremen	(United States) Danielle Lao (United States) Keri Wong	6–1, 4–6, [7–10]
Win	6–7	Jul 2015	Bursa Cup, Turkey	10,000	Clay	(Bulgaria) Isabella Shinikova	(Argentina) Ailen Crespo Azconzábal (Argentina) Ana Victoria Gobbi Monllau	6–2, 3–6, [10–7]
Loss	6–8	Mar 2016	ITF Orlando, United States	10,000	Clay	(Bosnia and Herzegovina) Ema Burgić Bucko	(Norway) Ulrikke Eikeri (Netherlands) Quirine Lemoine	1–6, 3–6
Loss	6–9	Jun 2016	ITF Ystad, Sweden	25,000	Clay	(Austria) Pia König	(Sweden) Cornelia Lister (Serbia) Nina Stojanović	4–6, 2–6
Win	7–9	Jul 2016	Palić Open, Serbia	10,000	Clay	(Serbia) Barbara Bonić	(Slovenia) Nina Potočnik (Czech Republic) Petra Krejsová	6–3, 6–3
Loss	7–10	Nov 2016	ITF Antalya, Turkey	10,000	Clay	(Estonia) Valeria Gorlats	(Turkey) Ayla Aksu (Turkey) Melis Sezer	1–6, 6–7^{(5)}
Win	8–10	Nov 2016	ITF Antalya, Turkey	10,000	Clay	(Turkey) Melis Sezer	(Hungary) Ágnes Bukta (Slovakia) Vivien Juhászová	6–4, 6–3
Win	9–10	Jan 2017	ITF Antalya, Turkey	15,000	Clay	(Bosnia and Herzegovina) Jasmina Tinjić	(Germany) Tayisiya Morderger (Germany) Yana Morderger	6–4, 6–7^{(4)}, [10–5]
Win	10–10	Feb 2017	ITF Antalya, Turkey	15,000	Clay	(Bosnia and Herzegovina) Jasmina Tinjić	(Germany) Tayisiya Morderger (Germany) Yana Morderger	2–6, 6–3, [10–8]
Loss	10–11	Mar 2017	ITF Antalya, Turkey	15,000	Clay	(Bosnia and Herzegovina) Jasmina Tinjić	(Russia) Anastasia Frolova (Russia) Alena Tarasova	5–7, 1–6
Win	11–11	Aug 2017	ITF Istanbul, Turkey	15,000	Clay	(Bosnia and Herzegovina) Jasmina Tinjić	(Japan) Chihiro Muramatsu (Turkey) Melis Sezer	6–4, 6–2
Win	12–11	Sep 2017	ITF Varna, Bulgaria	15,000	Clay	(Belgium) Michaela Boev	(United Kingdom) Maia Lumsden (Bulgaria) Julia Stamatova	2–6, 7–6^{(5)}, [10–3]
Win	13–11	Oct 2017	ITF Sozopol, Bulgaria	15,000	Hard	(Belgium) Michaela Boev	(Bulgaria) Julia Stamatova (France) Léa Tholey	6–2, 4–6, [16–14]
Loss	13–12	Nov 2017	ITF Antalya, Turkey	15,000	Clay	(Hungary) Réka Luca Jani	(Ukraine) Maryna Chernyshova (Belarus) Sviatlana Pirazhenka	4–6, 1–6
Loss	13–13	Dec 2017	ITF Antalya, Turkey	15,000	Clay	(Argentina) Paula Ormaechea	(Romania) Cristina Dinu (Finland) Mia Eklund	3–6, 2–6
Loss	13–14	Mar 2018	ITF Orlando, United States	15,000	Clay	(Belarus) Ilona Kremen	(United States) Caty McNally (United States) Whitney Osuigwe	2–6, 3–6
Win	14–14	Jun 2018	ITF Antalya, Turkey	15,000	Clay	(Russia) Angelina Zhuravleva	(Ukraine) Maryna Chernyshova (Turkey) Melis Sezer	7–5, 3–6, [14–12]
Win	15–14	Nov 2018	ITF Antalya, Turkey	15,000	Hard	(Hungary) Ágnes Bukta	(Russia) Veronika Pepelyaeva (Russia) Anastasia Tikhonova	6–3, 3–6, [11–9]
Win	16–14	Nov 2020	ITF Monastir, Tunisia	W15	Hard	(France) Carole Monnet	(Poland) Weronika Falkowska (Belarus) Anna Kubareva	6–3, 2–6, [10–5]
Win	17–14	May 2022	ITF Antalya, Turkey	W15	Clay	(Portugal) Inês Murta	(Japan) Rina Saigo (Japan) Yukina Saigo	6–0, 6–2
Win	18–14	May 2022	ITF Antalya, Turkey	W15	Clay	(Italy) Martina Colmegna	(Turkey) Doğa Türkmen (Turkey) Melis Ayda Uyar	6–2, 3–6, [10–8]
Loss	18–15	Mar 2024	ITF Antalya, Turkey	W15	Clay	(Turkey) İlay Yörük	(Czech Republic) Denisa Hindová (Italy) Vittoria Modesti	5–7, 3–6
Win	19–15	May 2024	ITF Antalya, Turkey	W15	Clay	(Italy) Verena Meliss	(Morocco) Aya El Aouni (Italy) Francesca Pace	6–4, 7–6^{(2)}
Loss	19–16	Sep 2025	ITF Kayseri, Turkiye	W15	Hard	(Germany) Vivien Sandberg	(Colombia) María Herazo González (Australia) Alana Subasic	7–6^{(4)}, 2–6, [9–11]
Win	20–16	Oct 2025	ITF Hilton Head Island, United States	W15	Clay	(Romania) Elena-Teodora Cadar	(United States) Bella Payne (United States) Sara Shumate	6–1, 2–6, [10–4]

== Fed Cup participation ==
Dia Evtimova debuted for the Bulgaria Fed Cup team in 2007. Since then, she has a 7–13 singles record and an 8–8 doubles record (15–21 overall).

=== Singles (7–13) ===
Edition	Round	Date	Location	Against	Surface	Opponent	W/L	Result
2007	Z1 RR	18 Apr 2007	Plovdiv (BUL)	Great Britain	Clay	Elena Baltacha	L	6–4, 4–6, 6–8
2007	Z1 RR	19 Apr 2007	Plovdiv (BUL)	Poland	Clay	Urszula Radwańska	L	1–6, 3–6
2007	Z1 RR	20 Apr 2007	Plovdiv (BUL)	Luxembourg	Clay	Mandy Minella	L	3–6, 7–5, 3–6
2007	Z1 RPO	21 Apr 2007	Plovdiv (BUL)	Lithuania	Clay	Julija Gotovskytė	W	6–1, 3–0 ret.
2008	Z1 RR	30 Jan 2008	Budapest (HUN)	Portugal	Carpet (i)	Ana Catarina Nogueira	W	6–2, 7–5
2008	Z1 RR	31 Jan 2008	Budapest (HUN)	Luxembourg	Carpet (i)	Mandy Minella	L	3–6, 7–6^{(7–2)}, 3–6
2008	Z1 RR	1 Feb 2008	Budapest (HUN)	Netherlands	Carpet (i)	Renée Reinhard	L	0–6, 3–6
2008	Z1 PO	2 Feb 2008	Budapest (HUN)	Hungary	Carpet (i)	Ágnes Szávay	L	0–6, 0–6
2010	Z1 RR	3 Feb 2010	Lisbon (POR)	Netherlands	Hard (i)	Chayenne Ewijk	L	1–6, 7–6^{(8–6)}, 2–6
2010	Z1 RR	4 Feb 2010	Lisbon (POR)	Israel	Hard (i)	Keren Shlomo	W	6–0, 6–3
2010	Z1 RPO	6 Feb 2010	Lisbon (POR)	Portugal	Hard (i)	Neuza Silva	W	6–1, 6–1
2011	Z1 RR	3 Feb 2011	Eilat (ISR)	Luxembourg	Hard	Anne Kremer	L	3–6, 3–6
2011	Z1 RPO	5 Feb 2011	Eilat (ISR)	Latvia	Hard	Irina Kuzmina	W	5–7, 6–3, 6–3
2012	Z1 PO	5 Feb 2012	Eilat (ISR)	Portugal	Hard	Michelle Larcher de Brito	L	1–6, 1–6
2013	Z1 RR	7 Feb 2013	Eilat (ISR)	Netherlands	Hard	Richèl Hogenkamp	W	4–6, 6–4, 6–2
2013	Z1 RR	9 Feb 2013	Eilat (ISR)	Slovenia	Hard	Tina Rupert	W	6–1, 6–0
2013	Z1 PPO	10 Feb 2013	Eilat (ISR)	(United Kingdom) Great Britain	Hard	Laura Robson	L	0–6, 4–6
2015	Z1 RR	6 Feb 2015	Budapest (HUN)	Georgia	Hard (i)	Ekaterine Gorgodze	L	4–6, 4–6
2015	Z1 PO	7 Feb 2015	Budapest (HUN)	Ukraine	Hard (i)	Elina Svitolina	L	2–6, 3–6
2016	Z1 PO	6 Feb 2016	Eilat (ISR)	(Georgia (country)) Georgia	Hard	Ekaterine Gorgodze	L	6–0, 4–6, 2–6

=== Doubles (8–7) ===
Edition	Round	Date	Location	Against	Surface	Partner	Opponents	W/L	Result
2007	Z1 RR	20 Apr 2007	Plovdiv (BUL)	Luxembourg	Clay	Dessislava Mladenova	Mandy Minella; Lynn Philippe	W	3–6, 7–6^{(7–3)}, 0–1 ret.
2008	Z1 RR	30 Jan 2008	Budapest (HUN)	Portugal	Carpet (i)	Tsvetana Pironkova	Magali de Lattre; Maria João Koehler	W	6–1, 6–2
2008	Z1 RR	31 Jan 2008	Budapest (HUN)	Luxembourg	Carpet (i)	Tsvetana Pironkova	Mandy Minella; Claudine Schaul	W	6–4, 6–3
2010	Z1 RR	3 Feb 2010	Lisbon (POR)	Netherlands	Hard (i)	Tsvetana Pironkova	Richèl Hogenkamp; Nicole Thyssen	W	7–5, 5–7, 6–2
2010	Z1 RR	4 Feb 2010	Lisbon (POR)	Israel	Hard (i)	Tsvetana Pironkova	Julia Glushko; Shahar Pe'er	L	2–6, 5–7
2011	Z1 RR	4 Feb 2011	Eilat (ISR)	Israel	Hard	Magdalena Maleeva	Valeria Patiuk; Keren Shlomo	W	6–3, 6–4
2012	Z1 RR	1 Feb 2012	Eilat (ISR)	Estonia	Hard	Tsvetana Pironkova	Eva Paalma; Tatjana Vorobjova	W	w/o
2012	Z1 RR	3 Feb 2012	Eilat (ISR)	Austria	Hard	Tsvetana Pironkova	Yvonne Meusburger; Patricia Mayr	L	1–6, 2–6
2013	Z1 RR	8 Feb 2013	Eilat (ISR)	Luxembourg	Hard	Isabella Shinikova	Laura Correia; Tiffany Cornelius	W	6–2, 6–2
2015	Z1 RR	4 Feb 2015	Budapest (HUN)	Portugal	Hard (i)	Viktoriya Tomova	Michelle Larcher de Brito; Bárbara Luz	W	6–0, 6–3
2015	Z1 RR	5 Feb 2015	Budapest (HUN)	Belarus	Hard (i)	Viktoriya Tomova	Vera Lapko; Aliaksandra Sasnovich	L	5–7, 1–6
2015	Z1 RR	6 Feb 2015	Budapest (HUN)	Georgia	Hard (i)	Elitsa Kostova	Oksana Kalashnikova; Sofia Shapatava	L	3–6, 2–6
2016	Z1 RR	3 Feb 2016	Eilat (ISR)	Hungary	Hard	Isabella Shinikova	Dalma Gálfi; Fanny Stollár	L	3–6, 1–6
2016	Z1 RR	4 Feb 2016	Eilat (ISR)	Latvia	Hard	Isabella Shinikova	Diāna Marcinkēviča; Jeļena Ostapenko	L	6–4, 0–6, 5–7
2016	Z1 RR	5 Feb 2016	Eilat (ISR)	Belgium	Hard	Isabella Shinikova	Marie Benoît; An-Sophie Mestach	L	7–6^{(7–4)}, 2–6, 4–6
