= SYMA Sports and Conference Centre =

Sports and event venue in Budapest, Hungary

Coordinates: 47.5007°N 19.1006°E

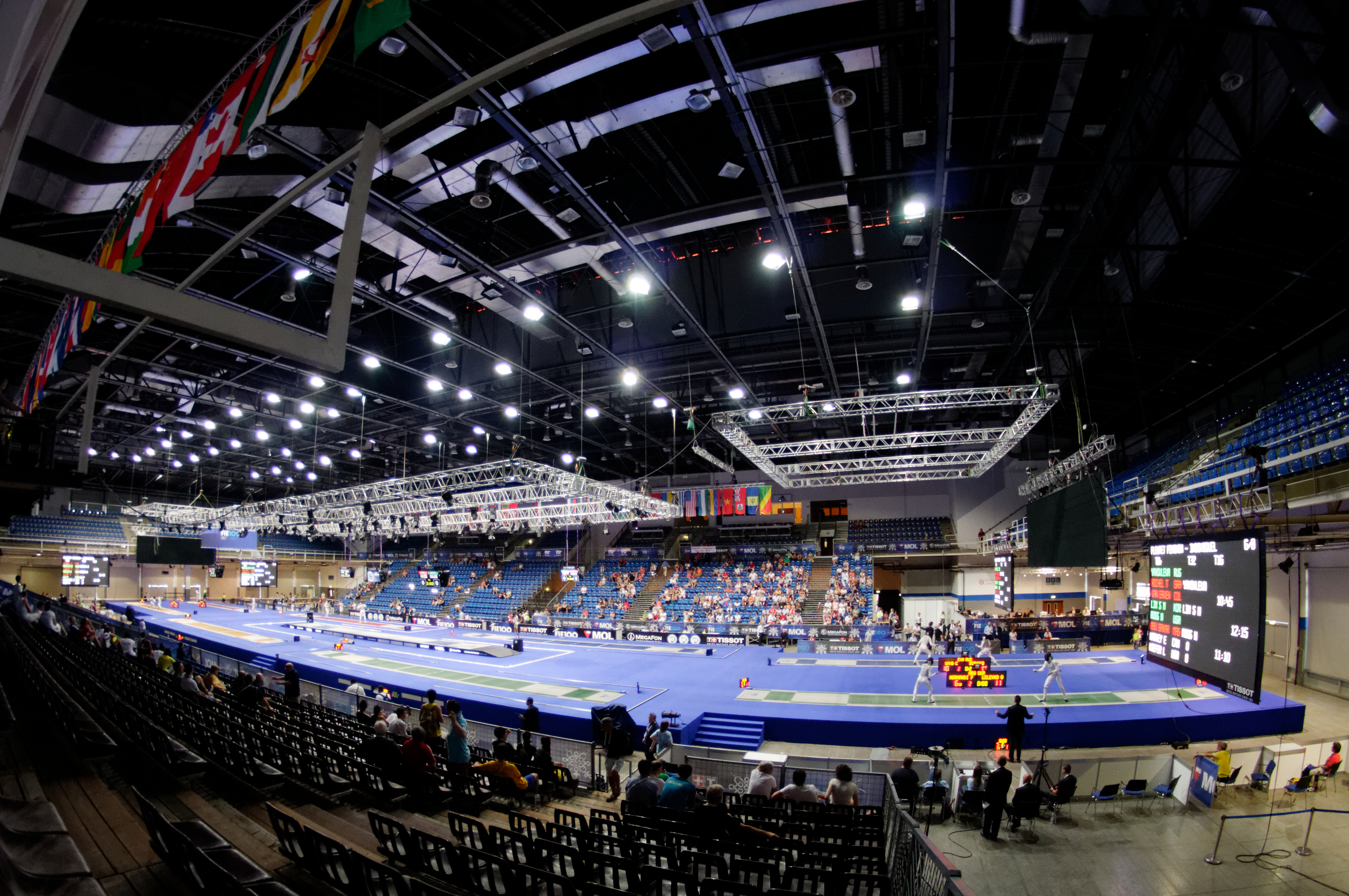
Hall A of the SYMA Centre during the 2013 World Fencing Championships

SYMA Sports and Conference Centre (Hungarian: SYMA Sport- és Rendezvényközpont) is a sports facility in Budapest, Hungary, which opened on 1 September 2006. SYMA has 3 halls: Hall 'A' is 8000 m², Hall 'B' is 5200 m², Hall 'C' is 2800 m². SYMA is used for sports events, concerts, conferences and exhibitions.

Hall 'A' has a maximum capacity of around 5,500 for sport events but concerts can accommodate more people, up to 10,000.
