= 1994 Federation Cup Europe/Africa Zone =

Subsection of tennis competition

The Europe/Africa Zone was one of three zones of regional Federation Cup qualifying competition in 1994. All ties were played at Freizeit Park in Bad Waltersdorf, Austria.

The twenty-four teams were divided into eight teams of three to compete in round-robin matches. After each of the ties had been played, the teams that finished first and second in each of the respective pools would then move on to the knockout stage of the competition. The four teams that won two matches of the knockout stage would go on to advance to the World Group.

== Pool Stage ==
- Date: April 18–22

	Pool A	BEL	TUR	EST
1	Belgium (2–0)		3–0	3–0
2	Turkey (1–1)	0–3		2–1
3	Estonia (0–2)	0–3	1–2	

	Pool B	AUT	POR	MLT
1	Austria (2–0)		3–0	3–0
2	Portugal (1–1)	0–3		3–0
3	Malta (0–2)	0–3	0–3	

	Pool C	GEO	UKR	TUN
1	Georgia (2–0)		2–1	3–0
2	Ukraine (1–1)	1–2		3–0
3	Tunisia (0–2)	0–3	0–3	

	Pool D	ROU	HUN	NOR
1	Romania (2–0)		3–0	3–0
2	Hungary (1–1)	0–3		3–0
3	Norway (0–2)	0–3	0–3	

	Pool E	SVK	GRE	LTU
1	Slovakia (2–0)		3–0	3–0
2	Greece (1–1)	0–3		2–1
3	Lithuania (0–2)	0–3	1–2	

	Pool F	GBR	RUS	LUX
1	Great Britain (2–0)		2–1	3–0
2	Russia (1–1)	1–2		3–0
3	Luxembourg (0–2)	0–3	0–3	

	Pool G	BLR	ISR	EGY
1	Belarus (2–0)		3–0	3–0
2	Israel (1–1)	0–3		3–0
3	Egypt (0–2)	0–3	0–3	

	Pool H	SLO	ZIM	IRL
1	Slovenia (2–0)		3–0	3–0
2	Zimbabwe (1–1)	0–3		2–1
3	Ireland (0–2)	0–3	1–2	

- Teams finishing last in their group will form the Europe/Africa Zone Group II in 1995.

== Knockout stage ==
Semifinals
Belgium	3
Turkey	0
Great Britain	3
Israel	0
Austria	2
Russia	1
Slovenia	1
Ukraine	2
Georgia	3
Zimbabwe	0
Slovakia	3
Greece	0
Romania	2
Hungary	1
Belarus	2
Portugal	1

Finals
Belgium	2
Great Britain	0
Austria	3
Ukraine	0
Georgia	1
Slovakia	2
Romania	1
Belarus	2

- Austria, Belarus, Belgium and Slovakia advanced to World Group.

== See also ==
- Fed Cup structure
