= 1996 Warsaw Cup by Heros – Singles =

Singles
- 1996 Warsaw Cup by Heros
- 1995 Champion: (Austria) Barbara Paulus

Final
- Champion: (Slovakia) Henrieta Nagyová
- Runner-up: (Austria) Barbara Paulus
- Score: 3–6, 6–2, 6–1

Details
- Draw: 32
- Seeds: 8

Events
Singles	Doubles
← 1995 ·	Warsaw Cup by Heros	· 1997 →

Barbara Paulus was the defending champion but lost in the final 3–6, 6–2, 6–1 against Henrieta Nagyová.

== Seeds ==
A champion seed is indicated in bold text while text in italics indicates the round in which that seed was eliminated.

1. n/a
2. (Austria) Barbara Paulus (final)
3. (Slovakia) Karina Habšudová (semifinals)
4. n/a
5. (Italy) Silvia Farina (semifinals)
6. (Slovakia) Katarína Studeníková (quarterfinals)
7. (Germany) Karin Kschwendt (second round)
8. (Germany) Sabine Hack (first round)
9. (France) Alexandra Fusai (first round)

== Draw ==
=== Key ===
- Q = Qualifier
- WC = Wild card
- LL = Lucky loser
- Alt = Alternate
- SE = Special exempt
- PR = Protected ranking
- ITF = ITF entry
- JE = Junior exempt
- w/o = Walkover
- r = Retired
- d = Defaulted
- SR = Special ranking

First round
LL	(Slovakia) D Krajčovičová	6	2
(Spain) **V Ruano-Pascual**	**7**	**6**
(Poland) M Grzybowska	5	5
(Slovakia) **J Husárová**	**7**	**7**
(Austria) S Dopfer	3	**6**	0
(Czech Republic) **P Langrová**	**6**	4	**6**
Q	(Argentina) B Fulco-Villella	3	6
6	(Slovakia) **K Studeníková**	**6**	**7**
9	(France) A Fusai	6	3
(Spain) **C Torrens Valero**	**7**	**6**
(Slovakia) **H Nagyová**	**7**	**6**
(Germany) J Kandarr	6	4
Q	(Poland) K Teodorowicz	4	**6**	2
(Italy) **F Perfetti**	**6**	4	**6**
WC	(Poland) A Zarska	0	2
7	(Germany) **K Kschwendt**	**6**	**6**
5	(Italy) **S Farina**	**7**	4	**7**
(Czech Republic) R Bobková	5	**6**	5
(Georgia (country)) L Meskhi	2	3
WC	(Poland) **K Straczy**	**6**	**6**
(Poland) **A Olsza**	**6**	**6**
Q	(Germany) I Heise	3	4
(Bulgaria) E Pampoulova	2	**6**	2
3	(Slovakia) **K Habšudová**	**6**	4	**6**
8	(Germany) S Hack	2	2
Q	(Romania) **C Cristea**	**6**	**6**
LL	(Ukraine) E Tatarkova	1	**7**	4
(Spain) **Á Montolio**	**6**	6	**6**
(Spain) M Sánchez Lorenzo	5	1
(Czech Republic) **S Kleinová**	**7**	**6**
(Czech Republic) L Richterová	5	0
2	(Austria) **B Paulus**	**7**	**6**

Second round
(Spain) V Ruano-Pascual	4	1
(Slovakia) **J Husárová**	**6**	**6**
(Czech Republic) P Langrová	**7**	5	5
6	(Slovakia) **K Studeníková**	5	**7**	**7**
(Spain) C Torrens Valero	**7**	1	5
(Slovakia) **H Nagyová**	6	**6**	**7**
(Italy) **F Perfetti**	**7**	**6**
7	(Germany) K Kschwendt	5	2
5	(Italy) **S Farina**	**6**	5	**6**
WC	(Poland) K Straczy	0	**7**	3
(Poland) A Olsza	4	3
3	(Slovakia) **K Habšudová**	**6**	**6**
Q	(Romania) **C Cristea**	**6**	6	**6**
(Spain) Á Montolio	1	**7**	2
(Czech Republic) S Kleinová	**6**	3	1
2	(Austria) **B Paulus**	1	**6**	**6**

Quarterfinals
(Slovakia) **J Husárová**	**6**	3	**6**
6	(Slovakia) K Studeníková	1	**6**	1
(Slovakia) **H Nagyová**	3	**6**	**6**
(Italy) F Perfetti	**6**	2	4
5	(Italy) S Farina	1	2
3	(Slovakia) **K Habšudová**	**6**	**6**
Q	(Romania) C Cristea	0	5
2	(Austria) **B Paulus**	**6**	**7**

Semifinals
(Slovakia) J Husárová	**6**	2	3
(Slovakia) **H Nagyová**	4	**6**	**6**
3	(Slovakia) K Habšudová	1	4
2	(Austria) **B Paulus**	**6**	**6**

Final
(Slovakia) **Henrieta Nagyová**	3	**6**	**6**
2	(Austria) Barbara Paulus	**6**	2	1
