= 1996 Warsaw Cup by Heros – Doubles =

Doubles
- 1996 Warsaw Cup by Heros
- 1995 Champions: (Italy) Sandra Cecchini; (Italy) Laura Garrone

Final
- Champions: (Ukraine) Olga Lugina; (Bulgaria) Elena Pampoulova
- Runners-up: (France) Alexandra Fusai; (Italy) Laura Garrone
- Score: 1–6, 6–4, 7–5

Details
- Draw: 16
- Seeds: 4

Events
Singles	Doubles
← 1995 ·	Warsaw Open	· 1997 →

Sandra Cecchini and Laura Garrone were the defending champions but only Garrone competed that year with Alexandra Fusai.

Fusai and Garrone lost in the final 1–6, 6–4, 7–5 against Olga Lugina and Elena Pampoulova.

== Seeds ==
Champion seeds are indicated in bold text while text in italics indicates the round in which those seeds were eliminated.

1. (France) Alexandra Fusai / (Italy) Laura Garrone (final)
2. (Ukraine) **Olga Lugina** / (Bulgaria) **Elena Pampoulova (champions)**
3. (Poland) Magdalena Grzybowska / (Poland) Aleksandra Olsza (semifinals)
4. (Czech Republic) Radka Bobková / (Czech Republic) Eva Melicharová (semifinals)

== Draw ==
=== Key ===
- Q = Qualifier
- WC = Wild card
- LL = Lucky loser
- Alt = Alternate
- SE = Special exempt
- PR = Protected ranking
- ITF = ITF entry
- JE = Junior exempt
- w/o = Walkover
- r = Retired
- d = Defaulted
- SR = Special ranking

First round

Quarterfinals

Semifinals

Final

1
- (France) **A Fusai**
- (Italy) **L Garrone**
**6**
**6**

- (Germany) V Martinek
- (Spain) C Torrens Valero
2
2

1
- (France) **A Fusai**
- (Italy) **L Garrone**
**6**
**6**

- (Italy) S Farina
- (Slovakia) H Nagyová
6
6

- (Romania) C Cristea
- (Ukraine) E Tatarkova
4
3

- (Romania) **C Cristea**
- (Ukraine) **E Tatarkova**
**7**
**7**

1
- (France) **A Fusai**
- (Italy) **L Garrone**
**6**
**6**

3
- (Poland) **M Grzybowska**
- (Poland) **A Olsza**
2
**6**
**6**

3
- (Poland) M Grzybowska
- (Poland) A Olsza
3
1

- (Spain) Á Montolio
- (Spain) V Ruano-Pascual
**6**
3
1

3
- (Poland) **M Grzybowska**
- (Poland) **A Olsza**
**6**
4
**7**

- (Russia) **J Lutrova**
- (Germany) **S Meier**
5
**6**
**6**

- (Russia) J Lutrova
- (Germany) S Meier
0
**6**
5

- (Georgia (country)) L Meskhi
- (Germany) C Schneider
**7**
2
2

1
- (France) Alexandra Fusai
- (Italy) Laura Garrone
**6**
4
5

- (Hungary) **V Csurgo**
- (Italy) **F Perfetti**
1
**6**
**6**

2
- (Ukraine) **Olga Lugina**
- (Bulgaria) **Elena Pampoulova**
1
**6**
**7**

- (Czech Republic) K Kroupová
- (Czech Republic) A Vašková
**6**
4
3

- (Hungary) V Csurgo
- (Italy) F Perfetti
**6**
2
3

- (Slovakia) D Krajčovičová
- (Czech Republic) P Langrová
2
3

4
- (Czech Republic) **R Bobková**
- (Czech Republic) **E Melicharová**
4
**6**
**6**

4
- (Czech Republic) **R Bobková**
- (Czech Republic) **E Melicharová**
**6**
**6**

4
- (Czech Republic) R Bobková
- (Czech Republic) E Melicharová
**7**
4
2

WC
- (Slovakia) K Habšudová
- (Germany) K Kschwendt
4
3

2
- (Ukraine) **O Lugina**
- (Bulgaria) **E Pampoulova**
5
**6**
**6**

- (Slovakia) **J Husárová**
- (Slovakia) **K Studeníková**
**6**
**6**

- (Slovakia) J Husárová
- (Slovakia) K Studeníková
3
**6**
5

Q
- (Argentina) M Díaz Oliva
- (Argentina) B Fulco-Villella
4
**6**
4

2
- (Ukraine) **O Lugina**
- (Bulgaria) **E Pampoulova**
**6**
3
**7**

2
- (Ukraine) **O Lugina**
- (Bulgaria) **E Pampoulova**
**6**
2
**6**
