= 1995 Warsaw Cup by Heros – Singles =

Singles
- 1995 Warsaw Cup by Heros

Final
- Champion: (Austria) Barbara Paulus
- Runner-up: (France) Alexandra Fusai
- Score: 7–6, 4–6, 6–1

Details
- Draw: 32
- Seeds: 8

Events
Singles	Doubles
Warsaw Open	· 1996 →

Barbara Paulus won in the final 7–6, 4–6, 6–1 against Alexandra Fusai.

== Seeds ==
A champion seed is indicated in bold text while text in italics indicates the round in which that seed was eliminated.

1. (Germany) Sabine Hack (second round)
2. (Italy) Sandra Cecchini (first round)
3. (Poland) Katarzyna Nowak (first round)
4. (Austria) Beate Reinstadler (first round)
5. (Austria) **Barbara Paulus (champion)**
6. (Germany) Petra Begerow (first round)
7. n/a
8. (Germany) Veronika Martinek (second round)

== Draw ==
=== Key ===
- Q = Qualifier
- WC = Wild card
- LL = Lucky loser
- Alt = Alternate
- SE = Special exempt
- PR = Protected ranking
- ITF = ITF entry
- JE = Junior exempt
- w/o = Walkover
- r = Retired
- d = Defaulted
- SR = Special ranking

First round
1	(Germany) **S Hack**	**6**	**6**
(Spain) G León García	2	3
Q	(Poland) **M Grzybowska**	**6**	**6**
(Slovakia) J Husárová	2	4
(Germany) **J Kandarr**	**6**	2	**7**
(Germany) M Kochta	3	**6**	5
WC	(Poland) A Olsza	5	**7**	2
8	(Germany) **V Martinek**	**7**	5	**6**
3	(Poland) K Nowak	2	3
Q	(Czech Republic) **K Kroupová**	**6**	**6**
(Czech Republic) **R Bobková**	**6**	**6**
LL	(Italy) L Garrone	2	1
(Spain) S Ramón-Cortés	3	1
(France) **A Fusai**	**6**	**6**
(Czech Republic) **L Němečková**	6	**6**	**6**
LL	(Czech Republic) A Vašková	**7**	0	3
6	(Germany) P Begerow	3	3
(Czech Republic) **L Richterová**	**6**	**6**
(Spain) **M Sánchez Lorenzo**	**7**	1	**6**
Q	(Ukraine) O Lugina	6	**6**	4
(Germany) **K Kschwendt**	**6**	**6**
(Czech Republic) P Langrová	1	3
(Argentina) **B Fulco-Villella**	**6**	2	**6**
4	(Austria) B Reinstadler	2	**6**	3
5	(Austria) **B Paulus**	**6**	**6**
(Italy) F Perfetti	2	4
Q	(Slovakia) **H Nagyová**	**6**	**6**
(Germany) S Meier	2	1
(Belarus) **T Ignatieva**	5	**6**	**6**
(Slovakia) D Szabova	**7**	4	4
(Slovakia) **R Zrubáková**	**6**	2	**7**
2	(Italy) S Cecchini	3	**6**	5

Second round
1	(Germany) S Hack	4	**6**	3
Q	(Poland) **M Grzybowska**	**6**	4	**6**
(Germany) **J Kandarr**	3	**6**	**6**
8	(Germany) V Martinek	**6**	4	1
Q	(Czech Republic) **K Kroupová**	**6**	2	**6**
(Czech Republic) R Bobková	0	**6**	2
(France) **A Fusai**	**6**	3	**7**
(Czech Republic) L Němečková	0	**6**	5
(Czech Republic) **L Richterová**	**7**	**6**
(Spain) M Sánchez Lorenzo	6	0
(Germany) **K Kschwendt**	**6**	**3**
(Argentina) B Fulco-Villella	2	1	r
5	(Austria) **B Paulus**	**6**	**6**
Q	(Slovakia) H Nagyová	3	2
(Belarus) **T Ignatieva**	**6**	**7**
(Slovakia) R Zrubáková	2	5

Quarterfinals
Q	(Poland) **M Grzybowska**	**7**	**6**
(Germany) J Kandarr	5	2
Q	(Czech Republic) K Kroupová	**6**	4	1
(France) **A Fusai**	2	**6**	**6**
(Czech Republic) L Richterová	**7**	3	4
(Germany) **K Kschwendt**	6	**6**	**6**
5	(Austria) **B Paulus**	4	**6**	**6**
(Belarus) T Ignatieva	**6**	0	2

Semifinals
Q	(Poland) M Grzybowska	1	**6**	1
(France) **A Fusai**	**6**	2	**6**
(Germany) K Kschwendt	1	5
5	(Austria) **B Paulus**	**6**	**7**

Final
(France) Alexandra Fusai	6	**6**	1
5	(Austria) **Barbara Paulus**	**7**	4	**6**
