= 1995 Warsaw Cup by Heros – Doubles =

Doubles
- 1995 Warsaw Cup by Heros

Final
- Champions: (Italy) Sandra Cecchini (Italy) Laura Garrone
- Runners-up: (Slovakia) Henrieta Nagyová (Slovakia) Denisa Szabová
- Score: 5–7, 6–2, 6–3

Details
- Draw: 16
- Seeds: 4

Events
Singles	Doubles
Warsaw Open	· 1996 →

Sandra Cecchini and Laura Garrone won in the final 5–7, 6–2, 6–3 against Henrieta Nagyová and Denisa Szabová.

== Seeds ==
Champion seeds are indicated in bold text while text in italics indicates the round in which those seeds were eliminated.

1. (Germany) Karin Kschwendt / (Canada) Rene Simpson (first round)
2. (France) Alexandra Fusai / (Slovakia) Radka Zrubáková (semifinals)
3. (Czech Republic) Radka Bobková / (Czech Republic) Petra Langrová (first round)
4. (Italy) **Sandra Cecchini** / (Italy) **Laura Garrone (champions)**

== Draw ==
=== Key ===
- Q = Qualifier
- WC = Wild card
- LL = Lucky loser
- Alt = Alternate
- SE = Special exempt
- PR = Protected ranking
- ITF = ITF entry
- JE = Junior exempt
- w/o = Walkover
- r = Retired
- d = Defaulted
- SR = Special ranking

First round
1	(Germany) K Kschwendt (Canada) R Simpson	4	**6**	5
Q	(Czech Republic) **O Hostáková** (Czech Republic) **M Kratochvílová**	**6**	2	**7**
(Bulgaria) **S Krivencheva** (Germany) **V Martinek**	3	**6**	**6**
(Germany) S Hack (Finland) P Thorén	**6**	3	2
4	(Italy) **S Cecchini** (Italy) **L Garrone**	**6**	**6**
(Czech Republic) P Kučová (Czech Republic) L Němečková	1	1
(Ukraine) **O Lugina** (Poland) **M Mroz**	**6**	**7**
LL	(Germany) Ad Barna (Germany) An Barna	2	5
(Slovakia) **H Nagyová** (Slovakia) **D Szabová**	**6**	**6**
(Spain) G León García (Spain) Á Montolio	2	4
WC	(Poland) **M Grzybowska** (Poland) **A Olsza**	**6**	**6**
3	(Czech Republic) R Bobková (Czech Republic) P Langrová	2	2
(Italy) F Perfetti (Poland) K Teodorowicz	4	4
(Germany) **S Meier** (Czech Republic) **L Richterová**	**6**	**6**
(Czech Republic) K Kroupová (Czech Republic) A Vašková	6	1
2	(France) **A Fusai** (Slovakia) **R Zrubáková**	**7**	**6**

Quarterfinals
Q	(Czech Republic) O Hostáková (Czech Republic) M Kratochvílová	3	4
(Bulgaria) **S Krivencheva** (Germany) **V Martinek**	**6**	**6**
4	(Italy) **S Cecchini** (Italy) **L Garrone**	**6**	**6**
(Ukraine) O Lugina (Poland) M Mroz	1	3
(Slovakia) **H Nagyová** (Slovakia) **D Szabová**	**6**	**6**
WC	(Poland) M Grzybowska (Poland) A Olsza	3	3
(Germany) S Meier (Czech Republic) L Richterová	**6**	3	5
2	(France) **A Fusai** (Slovakia) **R Zrubáková**	4	**6**	**7**

Semifinals
(Bulgaria) S Krivencheva (Germany) V Martinek	5	3
4	(Italy) **S Cecchini** (Italy) **L Garrone**	**7**	**6**
(Slovakia) **H Nagyová** (Slovakia) **D Szabová**	**w/o**
2	(France) A Fusai (Slovakia) R Zrubáková

Final
4	(Italy) **Sandra Cecchini** (Italy) **Laura Garrone**	5	**6**	**6**
(Slovakia) Henrieta Nagyová (Slovakia) Denisa Szabová	**7**	2	3
