= Julia Lutrova =

Russian tennis player

Julia Lutrova Юлия Лютрова
- Full name: Julia Lutrova
- Country (sports): Russia
- Born: 9 January 1975 (age 51) Soviet Union
- Coach: Nick Fulwood
- Prize money: $48,734

Singles
- Career record: 121–82
- Career titles: 3 ITF
- Highest ranking: No. 182 (17 June 1996)

Grand Slam singles results
- Wimbledon: Q1 (1996)
- US Open: Q1 (1996)

Doubles
- Career record: 56–37
- Career titles: 3 ITF
- Highest ranking: No. 124 (7 October 1996)

Grand Slam doubles results
- Wimbledon: 2R (1996)

Team competitions
- Fed Cup: 2–0

Julia Lutrova (Russian: Юлия Лютрова; born 9 January 1975) is a former Russian tennis player.

Lutrova won three singles and three doubles titles on the ITF tour in her career. On 17 June 1996, she reached her best singles ranking of world number 182. On 7 October 1996, she peaked at world number 124 in the doubles rankings.

Lutrova made two appearances for the Russia Fed Cup team in 1994. Two years later she reached the second round of women's doubles at the 1996 Wimbledon Championships.

== ITF finals ==
=== Singles (3–7) ===
Legend $100,000 tournaments $75,000 tournaments $50,000 tournaments $25,000 tournaments $10,000 tournaments	Finals by surface Hard (2–2) Clay (0–0) Grass (0–3) Carpet (1–2)

Result	No.	Date	Tournament	Surface	Opponent	Score
Loss	1.	11 October 1993	Moscow, Russia	Hard (i)	(Russia) Anna Linkova	5–7, 6–1, 6–7^{(6–8)}
Win	1.	18 October 1993	Šiauliai, Lithuania	Hard (i)	(Ukraine) Talina Beiko	6–3, 6–2
Win	2.	7 March 1994	Offenbach am Main, Germany	Carpet (i)	(Germany) Heike Thoms	6–3, 6–3
Loss	2.	17 July 1995	Frinton-on-Sea, United Kingdom	Grass	(Netherlands) Amanda Hopmans	2–6, 6–7^{(1–7)}
Loss	3.	7 August 1995	Southsea, United Kingdom	Grass	(United Kingdom) Jane Wood	1–6, 5–7
Loss	4.	13 November 1995	Edinburgh 3, United Kingdom	Carpet (i)	(Netherlands) Seda Noorlander	3–6, 6–4, 5–7
Loss	5.	28 July 1997	Ilkley, United Kingdom	Grass	(South Africa) Surina de Beer	5–7, 1–6
Loss	6.	21 September 1998	Sunderland, United Kingdom	Hard (i)	(Germany) Mia Buric	2–6, 6–7^{(4–7)}
Win	3.	8 February 1999	Birmingham, United Kingdom	Hard (i)	(Netherlands) Brechtje Bruls	7–5, 6–3
Loss	7.	19 July 1999	Dublin, Ireland	Carpet	(United Kingdom) Lucie Ahl	1–6, 3–6

=== Doubles (3–3) ===
Legend $100,000 tournaments $75,000 tournaments $50,000 tournaments $25,000 tournaments $10,000 tournaments	Finals by surface Hard (1–1) Clay (0–1) Grass (1–1) Carpet (1–0)

Result	No.	Date	Tournament	Surface	Partner	Opponents	Score
Loss	1.	19 October 1992	Moscow, Russia	Hard (i)	(Russia) Elena Likhovtseva	(Russia) Natalia Egorova (Russia) Svetlana Parkhomenko	4–6, 6–4, 4–6
Win	1.	24 October 1994	Šiauliai, Lithuania	Hard (i)	(Russia) Maria Marfina	(Ukraine) Natalia Biletskaya (Ukraine) Natalia Bondarenko	2–6, 6–3, 6–2
Win	2.	17 July 1995	Frinton-on-Sea, United Kingdom	Grass	(Russia) Natalia Egorova	(Australia) Robyn Mawdsley (Australia) Shannon Peters	7–6^{(7–2)}, 1–6, 6–4
Win	3.	13 November 1995	Edinburgh 3, United Kingdom	Carpet (i)	(United Kingdom) Jane Wood	(United Kingdom) Shirli-Ann Siddall (United Kingdom) Amanda Wainwright	7–6^{(9–7)}, 6–4
Loss	2.	23 September 1996	Bucharest, Romania	Clay	(Hungary) Virág Csurgó	(Germany) Anca Barna (Germany) Adriana Barna	6–4, 1–6, 0–6
Loss	3.	28 July 1997	Ilkley, United Kingdom	Grass	(Australia) Gail Biggs	(Australia) Trudi Musgrave (Australia) Cindy Watson	1–6, 1–6

== Fed Cup participation ==
=== Doubles ===
Edition	Stage	Date	Location	Against	Surface	Partner	Opponents	W/L	Score
1994 Fed Cup	E/A Zone Pool F	19 April 1994	Bad Waltersdorf, Austria	Luxembourg	Clay	(Russia) Tatiana Panova	(Luxembourg) Anne Kremer (Luxembourg) Rosabel Moyen	W	7–5, 6–3
1994 Fed Cup	E/A Zone Pool F	20 April 1994	Bad Waltersdorf, Austria	(United Kingdom) Great Britain	Clay	(Russia) Tatiana Panova	(United Kingdom) Karen Cross (United Kingdom) Julie Pullin	W	7–5, 7–5
