= Petra Gáspár =

Hungarian tennis player

- Country (sports): Hungary
- Born: 13 February 1977 (age 48); Hungary
- Prize money: $61,280

Singles
- Career record: 124–102
- Career titles: 0
- Highest ranking: 165 (16 September 1996)

Grand Slam singles results
- Australian Open: Q1 (1997)
- French Open: Q2 (1997)
- Wimbledon: Q1 (1996, 1997)
- US Open: Q3 (1996)

Doubles
- Career record: 23–35
- Career titles: 0
- Highest ranking: 232 (15 June 1998)

Grand Slam doubles results
- Australian Open Junior: QF (1995)
- French Open Junior: 1R (1994)
- US Open Junior: QF (1994)

Team competitions
- Fed Cup: 1–7

Petra Gáspár (born 13 February 1977) is a former Hungarian tennis player. On 16 September 1996, she reached a singles ranking high of world No. 165.

Representing Hungary in the Fed Cup, Gáspár has an overall record of 1–7.

== ITF finals ==
=== Doubles: 3 (0–3) ===
Legend $100,000 tournaments $75,000 tournaments $50,000 tournaments $25,000 tournaments $10,000 tournaments	Finals by surface Hard (0–1) Clay (0–2) Grass (0–0) Carpet (0–0)

Result	Date	Tournament	Surface	Partner	Opponents	Score
Loss	Apr 1993	ITF Acapulco, Mexico	Clay	(Czech Republic) Alena Havrlíková	(South Africa) Rene Mentz (United States) Claire Sessions Bailey	1–6, 3–6
Loss	Apr 1998	ITF Dubai, United Arab Emirates	Hard	(San Marino) Ludmila Varmužová	(Indonesia) Wynne Prakusya (Thailand) Benjamas Sangaram	6–7^{(1)}, 6–1, 3–6
Loss	Jun 1998	ITF Budapest, Hungary	Clay	(Hungary) Petra Mandula	(Hungary) Anna Földényi (Hungary) Rita Kuti-Kis	0–6, 4–6

== Fed Cup participation ==
=== Singles ===
Edition	Round	Date	Location	Against	Surface	Opponent	W/L	Score
1994 Fed Cup	E/A Zone Pool D	19 April 1994	Bad Waltersdorf, Austria	Norway	Clay	(Norway) Linda Beate Andersen	W	6–1, 6–4
1994 Fed Cup	E/A Zone Pool D	21 April 1994	Bad Waltersdorf, Austria	Romania	Clay	(Romania) Irina Spîrlea	L	1–6, 6–7^{(5)}
1994 Fed Cup	E/A Zone Pool k/o	22 April 1994	Bad Waltersdorf, Austria	Romania	Clay	(Romania) Irina Spîrlea	L	3–6, 0–6
1998 Fed Cup	E/A Zone Group I	14 April 1998	Murcia, Spain	Sweden	Clay	(Sweden) Åsa Carlsson	L	6–7^{(5)}, 5–7
1998 Fed Cup	E/A Zone Group I	15 April 1998	Murcia, Spain	Ukraine	Clay	(Ukraine) Elena Tatarkova	L	1–6, 4–6
1998 Fed Cup	E/A Zone Group I	16 April 1998	Murcia, Spain	(Serbia and Montenegro) Yugoslavia	Clay	(Serbia and Montenegro) Sandra Naćuk	L	1–6, 3–6

=== Doubles ===
Edition	Round	Date	Location	Against	Surface	Partner	Opponents	W/L	Score
1998 Fed Cup	E/A Zone Group I	15 April 1998	Murcia, Spain	Ukraine	Clay	(Hungary) Adrienn Hegedűs	(Ukraine) Tatiana Kovalchuk (Ukraine) Elena Tatarkova	L	4–6, 7–6^{(8)}, 3–6
1998 Fed Cup	E/A Zone Group I	16 April 1998	Murcia, Spain	(Serbia and Montenegro) Yugoslavia	Clay	(Hungary) Zsófia Gubacsi	(Serbia and Montenegro) Tatjana Ječmenica (Serbia and Montenegro) Dragana Zarić	L	4–6, 3–6
