= 1994 Federation Cup Europe/Africa Zone – Knockout Stage =

International tennis competition

The Knockout Stage of the 1994 Federation Cup Europe/Africa Zone was the final stage of the Zonal Competition involving teams from Europe and Africa. Those that qualified for this stage placed first and second in their respective pools.

Placing	Pool A	Pool B	Pool C	Pool D	Pool E	Pool F	Pool G	Pool H
1	Belgium	Austria	Georgia	Romania	Slovakia	Great Britain	Belarus	Slovenia
2	Turkey	Portugal	Ukraine	Hungary	Greece	Russia	Israel	Zimbabwe
3	Estonia	Malta	Tunisia	Norway	Lithuania	Luxembourg	Egypt	Ireland

The sixteen teams were then randomly drawn into a two-stage knockout tournament, with the four winners qualifying for the World Group.

== Draw ==
Semifinals
Belgium	3
Turkey	0
Great Britain	3
Israel	0
Austria	2
Russia	1
Slovenia	1
Ukraine	2
Georgia	3
Zimbabwe	0
Slovakia	3
Greece	0
Romania	2
Hungary	1
Belarus	2
Portugal	1

Finals
Belgium	2
Great Britain	0
Austria	3
Ukraine	0
Georgia	1
Slovakia	2
Romania	1
Belarus	2

=== Semifinals ===
==== Belgium vs. Turkey ====
Belgium
3
Freizeit Park, Bad Waltersdorf, Austria
22 April 1994
Red clay (outdoors)

Turkey
0

			1	2	3
1	(Belgium) (Turkey)	Dominique Monami; Esra Bayburt	6; 1	6; 0
2	(Belgium) (Turkey)	Sabine Appelmans; Duygu Akşit Oal	6; 1	6; 1
3	(Belgium) (Turkey)	Sabine Appelmans / Laurence Courtois; Duygu Akşit Oal / Stela Penciu	6; 4	7; 5

==== Great Britain vs. Israel ====
Great Britain
3
Freizeit Park, Bad Waltersdorf, Austria
22 April 1994
Red clay (outdoors)

Israel
0

			1	2	3
1	(United Kingdom) (Israel)	Jo Durie; Shiri Burstein	6; 3	6; 2
2	(United Kingdom) (Israel)	Clare Wood; Anna Smashnova	6; 2	6; 1
3	(United Kingdom) (Israel)	Jo Durie / Clare Wood; Shiri Burstein / Tzipora Obziler	6; 1	6; 0

==== Austria vs. Russia ====
Austria
2
Freizeit Park, Bad Waltersdorf, Austria
22 April 1994
Red clay (outdoors)

Russia
1

			1	2	3
1	(Austria) (Russia)	Barbara Schett; Eugenia Maniokova	3; 6	4; 6
2	(Austria) (Russia)	Judith Wiesner; Elena Makarova	6; 1	6; 2
3	(Austria) (Russia)	Petra Schwarz / Judith Wiesner; Elena Makarova / Eugenia Maniokova	7; 5	6; 4

==== Slovenia vs. Ukraine ====
Slovenia
1
Freizeit Park, Bad Waltersdorf, Austria
22 April 1994
Red clay (outdoors)

Ukraine
2

			1	2	3
1	(Slovenia) (Ukraine)	Tina Križan; Elena Tatarkova	6; 2	6; 0
2	(Slovenia) (Ukraine)	Barbara Mulej; Natalia Medvedeva	2; 6	6; 4	3; 6
3	(Slovenia) (Ukraine)	Tina Križan / Karin Lusnić; Elena Brioukhovets / Natalia Medvedeva	3; 6	6^{6} 7^{8}

==== Georgia vs. Zimbabwe ====
Georgia
3
Freizeit Park, Bad Waltersdorf, Austria
22 April 1994
Red clay (outdoors)

Zimbabwe
0

			1	2	3
1	(Georgia (country)) (Zimbabwe)	Nino Louarsabishvili; Diana Mills	6; 0	6; 0
2	(Georgia (country)) (Zimbabwe)	Leila Meskhi; Cara Black	6; 4	6; 2
3	(Georgia (country)) (Zimbabwe)	Victoria Bakhtadze / Nino Louarsabishvili; Cara Black / Nicole Wagstaff	4; 6	7; 5	6; 4

==== Slovakia vs. Greece ====
Slovakia
3
Freizeit Park, Bad Waltersdorf, Austria
22 April 1994
Red clay (outdoors)

Greece
0

			1	2	3
1	(Slovakia) (Greece)	Radka Zrubáková; Alexandra Rentzoula	6; 0	6; 1
2	(Slovakia) (Greece)	Karina Habšudová; Christina Zachariadou	6; 1	2; 0		retired
3	(Slovakia) (Greece)	Janette Husárová / Radka Zrubáková; Alexandra Rentzoula / Christina Zachariadou				w/o

==== Romania vs. Hungary ====
Romania
2
Freizeit Park, Bad Waltersdorf, Austria
22 April 1994
Red clay (outdoors)

Hungary
1

			1	2	3
1	(Romania) (Hungary)	Ruxandra Dragomir; Rita Kuti-Kis	7; 5	7^{7} 6^{5}
2	(Romania) (Hungary)	Irina Spîrlea; Petra Gáspár	6; 3	6; 0
3	(Romania) (Hungary)	Cătălina Cristea / Irina Spîrlea; Rita Kuti-Kis / Petra Mandula	6; 1	1; 2		retired

==== Belarus vs. Portugal ====
Belarus
2
Freizeit Park, Bad Waltersdorf, Austria
22 April 1994
Red clay (outdoors)

Portugal
1

			1	2	3
1	(Belarus) (Portugal)	Tatiana Ignatieva; Joana Pedroso	6; 4	6; 1
2	(Belarus) (Portugal)	Natasha Zvereva; Sofia Prazeres	1; 6	6; 0	6; 1
3	(Belarus) (Portugal)	Marina Stets / Vera Zhukovets; Joana Pedroso / Sofia Prazeres	2; 6	2; 6

=== Finals ===
==== Belgium vs. Great Britain ====
Belgium
2
Freizeit Park, Bad Waltersdorf, Austria
23 April 1994
Red clay (outdoors)

Great Britain
0

			1	2	3
1	(Belgium) (United Kingdom)	Dominique Monami; Jo Durie	7; 5	6; 3
2	(Belgium) (United Kingdom)	Sabine Appelmans; Clare Wood	5; 7	6; 3	6; 2
3	(Belgium) (United Kingdom)					not played

==== Austria vs. Ukraine ====
Austria
3
Freizeit Park, Bad Waltersdorf, Austria
23 April 1994
Red clay (outdoors)

Ukraine
0

			1	2	3
1	(Austria) (Ukraine)	Petra Schwarz; Elena Brioukhovets	6; 3	6; 4
2	(Austria) (Ukraine)	Judith Wiesner; Natalia Medvedeva	6; 2	6; 4
3	(Austria) (Ukraine)	Petra Schwarz / Barbara Schett; Elena Brioukhovets / Natalia Medvedeva	1; 0			retired

==== Georgia vs. Slovakia ====
Georgia
1
Freizeit Park, Bad Waltersdorf, Austria
23 April 1994
Red clay (outdoors)

Slovakia
2

			1	2	3
1	(Georgia (country)) (Slovakia)	Nino Louarsabishvili; Radka Zrubáková	2; 6	1; 6
2	(Georgia (country)) (Slovakia)	Leila Meskhi; Janette Husárová	6; 4	6; 1
3	(Georgia (country)) (Slovakia)	Nino Louarsabishvili / Leila Meskhi; Karina Habšudová / Radka Zrubáková	5; 7	3; 6

==== Romania vs. Belarus ====
Romania
1
Freizeit Park, Bad Waltersdorf, Austria
23 April 1994
Red clay (outdoors)

Belarus
2

			1	2	3
1	(Romania) (Belarus)	Ruxandra Dragomir; Tatiana Ignatieva	6; 2	6; 4
2	(Romania) (Belarus)	Irina Spîrlea; Natasha Zvereva	3; 6	6; 3	1; 6
3	(Romania) (Belarus)	Cătălina Cristea / Ruxandra Dragomir; Tatiana Ignatieva / Natasha Zvereva	1; 6	5; 7

- Belgium, Austria, Slovakia and Belarus advanced to the World Group. Belgium and Belarus were defeated in the first round by Sweden, 2–1, and Netherlands, 2–1, respectively. Slovakia defeated Finland in the first round, 2–1, before being defeated by Germany, 2–1, in the second round. Austria, however, defeated Poland in the first round, 2–1, and the previous year's finalist Australia, 2–1, in the second; before finally falling to United States in the quarterfinals, 3–0.

== See also ==
- Fed Cup structure
