= Ines Heise =

German tennis player

- Country (sports): Germany
- Born: 9 November 1975 (age 49)
- Prize money: $37,807

Singles
- Career record: 161–156
- Highest ranking: No. 209 (16 Dec 1996)

Doubles
- Career record: 15–26
- Highest ranking: No. 455 (24 Aug 1998)

Ines Heise (born 9 November 1975) is a German former professional tennis player.

Heise qualified for her only WTA Tour main draw at the 1996 Warsaw Cup by Heros. Following qualifying wins over Sylwia Rynarzewska, Kateřina Kroupová and Elena Tatarkova, she was beaten in the first round by Polish player Aleksandra Olsza. She reached her career high singles ranking of 209 in the world in December 1996.

== ITF finals ==
=== Singles: 1 (0–1) ===
Result	No.	Date	Tournament	Surface	Opponent	Score
Loss	1.	23 September 2001	Barcelona, Spain	Clay	(Spain) Arantxa Parra Santonja	3–6, 2–6
