= 1995 Warsaw Cup by Heros =

- Date: 11–17 September
- Edition: 1st
- Category: Tier III
- Draw: 32S /16D
- Prize money: $161,250
- Surface: Clay / outdoor
- Location: Warsaw, Poland
- Venue: Warszawianka Tennis Centre

Champions

Singles
- (Austria) Barbara Paulus

Doubles
- (Italy) Sandra Cecchini / (Italy) Laura Garrone
Warsaw Open	· 1996 →

The 1995 Warsaw Cup by Heros was a women's tennis tournament played on outdoor clay courts at the Warszawianka Tennis Centre in Warsaw, Poland that was part of Tier III of the 1995 WTA Tour. It was the inaugural edition of the tournament and was held from 11 September until 17 September 1995. Fifth-seeded Barbara Paulus won the singles title and earned $25,000 first-prize money.

== Finals ==
=== Singles ===
(Austria) Barbara Paulus defeated (France) Alexandra Fusai 7–6, 4–6, 6–1

- It was Paulus' 1st title of the year and the 4th of her career.

=== Doubles ===
(Italy) Sandra Cecchini / (Italy) Laura Garrone defeated (Slovakia) Henrieta Nagyová / (Slovakia) Denisa Szabova 5–7, 6–2, 6–3

- It was Cecchini's only title of the year and the 22nd of her career. It was Garrone's only title of the year and the 5th of her career.
