= 1994 Federation Cup Europe/Africa Zone – Pool F =

Group F of the 1994 Federation Cup Europe/Africa Zone was one of eight pools in the Europe/Africa zone of the 1994 Federation Cup. Three teams competed in a round robin competition, with the top two teams qualifying for the knockout stage.

	(United Kingdom) GBR	(Russia) RUS	(Luxembourg) LUX	RR; W–L	Set; W–L	Game; W–L	Standings
Great Britain		2–1	3–0	2–0	10–4	82–58	1
Russia	1–2		3–0	1–1	10–4	83–60	2
Luxembourg	0–3	0–3		0–2	0–12	27–74	3

== Great Britain vs. Luxembourg ==
Great Britain
3
Freizeit Park, Bad Waltersdorf, Austria
18 April 1994
Red clay (outdoors)

Luxembourg
0

			1	2	3
1	(United Kingdom) (Luxembourg)	Jo Durie; Rosabel Moyen	7; 5	6; 0
2	(United Kingdom) (Luxembourg)	Clare Wood; Anne Kremer	6; 1	6; 2
3	(United Kingdom) (Luxembourg)	Jo Durie / Clare Wood; Anne Kremer / Rosabel Moyen	6; 4	6; 0

== Russia vs. Luxembourg ==
Russia
3
Freizeit Park, Bad Waltersdorf, Austria
19 April 1994
Red clay (outdoors)

Luxembourg
0

			1	2	3
1	(Russia) (Luxembourg)	Elena Makarova; Rosabel Moyen	6; 1	6; 1
2	(Russia) (Luxembourg)	Eugenia Maniokova; Anne Kremer	6; 4	6; 1
3	(Russia) (Luxembourg)	Julia Lutrova / Tatiana Panova; Anne Kremer / Rosabel Moyen	7; 5	6; 3

== Great Britain vs. Russia ==
Great Britain
2
Freizeit Park, Bad Waltersdorf, Austria
20 April 1994
Red clay (outdoors)

Russia
1

			1	2	3
1	(United Kingdom) (Russia)	Jo Durie; Elena Makarova	4; 6	7; 5	7; 5
2	(United Kingdom) (Russia)	Clare Wood; Eugenia Maniokova	2; 6	6; 3	9; 7
3	(United Kingdom) (Russia)	Karen Cross / Julie Pullin; Julia Lutrova / Tatiana Panova	5; 7	5; 7

== See also ==
- Fed Cup structure
