= Olga Hostáková =

Czech tennis player

- Country (sports): Czech Republic
- Born: 11 April 1975 (age 51) Czechoslovakia
- Turned pro: 1992
- Retired: 2001
- Prize money: US$ 20,947

Singles
- Career record: 68–66
- Career titles: 2 ITF
- Highest ranking: No. 336 (18 July 1994)

Doubles
- Career record: 47–44
- Career titles: 5 ITF
- Highest ranking: No. 187 (4 December 1995)

Olga Hostáková (born 11 April 1975) is a Czech former tennis player.

Hostáková won two singles and five doubles titles on the ITF Circuit in her career. On 18 July 1994, she reached her best singles ranking of world No. 336. On 4 December 1995, she peaked at No. 187 in the WTA doubles rankings.

Hostáková made her WTA Tour debut in the doubles draw at the 1995 Warsaw Cup.

Her daughters Annika and Kristina Penickova also play tennis. Her brother is a former hockey player Martin Hosták.

== ITF finals ==
=== Singles (2–0) ===
Legend $100,000 tournaments $75,000 tournaments $50,000 tournaments $25,000 tournaments $10,000 tournaments	Finals by surface Hard (0–0) Clay (2–0) Grass (0–0) Carpet (0–0)

Result	No.	Date	Tournament	Surface	Opponent	Score
Win	1.	9 August 1993	ITF Paderborn, Germany	Clay	(Russia) Irina Zvereva	6–0, 6–0
Win	2.	24 July 1995	ITF Orbetello, Italy	Clay	(Italy) Cristina Salvi	6–4, 7–5

=== Doubles (5–1) ===
Legend $100,000 tournaments $75,000 tournaments $50,000 tournaments $25,000 tournaments $10,000 tournaments	Finals by surface Hard (1–0) Clay (3–1) Grass (0–0) Carpet (1–0)

Result	No.	Date	Tournament	Surface	Partner	Opponents	Score
Win	1.	9 August 1993	Paderborn, Germany	Clay	(Czech Republic) Monika Kratochvílová	(Australia) Jenny Anne Fetch (Australia) Angie Marik	6–2, 6–1
Win	2.	20 September 1993	Rabac, Croatia	Clay	(Czech Republic) Monika Kratochvílová	(Czech Republic) Petra Holubová (Czech Republic) Helena Vildová	6–4, 6–4
Win	3.	12 December 1994	Přerov, Czech Republic	Hard (i)	(Czech Republic) Eva Krejčová	(Russia) Anna Linkova (Slovakia) Henrieta Nagyová	6–4, 6–4
Win	4.	6 March 1995	Buchen, Germany	Carpet (i)	(Germany) Sabine Gerke	(Netherlands) Mariëlle Bruens (Netherlands) Anique Snijders	6–1, 6–2
Loss	1.	21 August 1995	Wezel, Belgium	Clay	(India) Nirupama Vaidyanathan	(Czech Republic) Ivana Havrlíková (Czech Republic) Monika Kratochvílová	2–6, 3–6
Win	5.	7 April 1997	Galatina, Italy	Clay	(Czech Republic) Zdeňka Málková	(Italy) Laura Fodorean (Romania) Oana Elena Golimbioschi	3–6, 6–2, 6–1
