= 1994 Federation Cup Europe/Africa Zone – Pool H =

Group H of the 1994 Federation Cup Europe/Africa Zone was one of eight pools in the Europe/Africa zone of the 1994 Federation Cup. Three teams competed in a round robin competition, with the top two teams qualifying for the knockout stage.

	(Slovenia) SLO	(Zimbabwe) ZIM	(Republic of Ireland) IRL	RR; W–L	Set; W–L	Game; W–L	Standings
Slovenia		3–0	3–0	2–0	12–1	77–21	1
Zimbabwe	0–3		2–1	1–1	10–2	50–59	2
Ireland	0–3	1–2		0–2	3–10	39–70	3

== Slovenia vs. Zimbabwe ==
Slovenia
3
Freizeit Park, Bad Waltersdorf, Austria
18 April 1994
Red clay (outdoors)

Zimbabwe
0

			1	2	3
1	(Slovenia) (Zimbabwe)	Tina Križan; Diana Mills	6; 0	6; 0
2	(Slovenia) (Zimbabwe)	Barbara Mulej; Cara Black	6; 3	6; 1
3	(Slovenia) (Zimbabwe)	Tina Križan / Karin Lusnić; Cara Black / Nicole Wagstaff	6; 1	6; 0

== Zimbabwe vs. Ireland ==
Zimbabwe
2
Freizeit Park, Bad Waltersdorf, Austria
19 April 1994
Red clay (outdoors)

Ireland
1

			1	2	3
1	(Zimbabwe) (Republic of Ireland)	Nicole Wagstaff; Gina Niland	1; 6	3; 6
2	(Zimbabwe) (Republic of Ireland)	Cara Black; Karen Nugent	7^{7} 6^{2}	6; 1
3	(Zimbabwe) (Republic of Ireland)	Cara Black / Nicole Wagstaff; Claire Curran / Karen Nugent	6; 1	6; 3

== Slovenia vs. Ireland ==
Slovenia
3
Freizeit Park, Bad Waltersdorf, Austria
20 April 1994
Red clay (outdoors)

Ireland
0

			1	2	3
1	(Slovenia) (Republic of Ireland)	Tina Križan; Gina Niland	6; 0	6; 0
2	(Slovenia) (Republic of Ireland)	Barbara Mulej; Karen Nugent	6; 2	6; 1
3	(Slovenia) (Republic of Ireland)	Tina Križan / Karin Lusnić; Claire Curran / Lesley O'Halloran	4; 6	6; 2	7; 5

== See also ==
- Fed Cup structure
