= Monika Starosta =

Polish tennis player

- Country (sports): Poland
- Born: 21 December 1972 (age 52)
- Prize money: $24,550

Singles
- Highest ranking: No. 362 (18 October 1993)

Doubles
- Highest ranking: No. 311 (8 August 1994)

Monika Starosta (born 21 December 1972) is a former professional tennis player from Poland.

Starosta competed on the ITF circuit in the 1990s and reached a best singles ranking of 362 in the world.

During her career she appeared in one Fed Cup tie for Poland, against Belarus in 1997.

== ITF finals ==
=== Singles (0–3) ===
Result	No.	Date	Tournament	Surface	Opponent	Score
Loss	1.	23 May 1993	Katowice, Poland	Clay	(Slovakia) Zuzana Nemšáková	Walkover
Loss	2.	29 August 1993	Gryfino, Poland	Clay	(United Kingdom) Amanda Wainwright	6–4, 4–6, 1–6
Loss	3.	20 August 1995	Wahlscheid, Germany	Clay	(Bulgaria) Pavlina Stoyanova	4–6, 1–6

=== Doubles (0–3) ===
Result	No.	Date	Tournament	Surface	Partner	Opponents	Score
Loss	1.	27 July 1992	Lohja, Finland	Clay	(Japan) Miyako Ataka	(Romania) Cătălina Cristea (Austria) Andrea Tunko	2–6, 6–7^{(4)}
Loss	2.	29 August 1993	Gryfino, Poland	Clay	(Czech Republic) Alena Vašková	(Poland) Aleksandra Olsza (Ukraine) Elena Tatarkova	6–7^{(4)}, 6–4, 5–7
Loss	3.	19 June 1994	Maribor, Slovenia	Clay	(Poland) Sylwia Rynarzewska	(Slovakia) Henrieta Nagyová (Czech Republic) Veronika Šafářová	5–7, 0–6

== See also ==
- List of Poland Fed Cup team representatives
