= Arantxa Parra Santonja =

Spanish tennis player (born 1982)

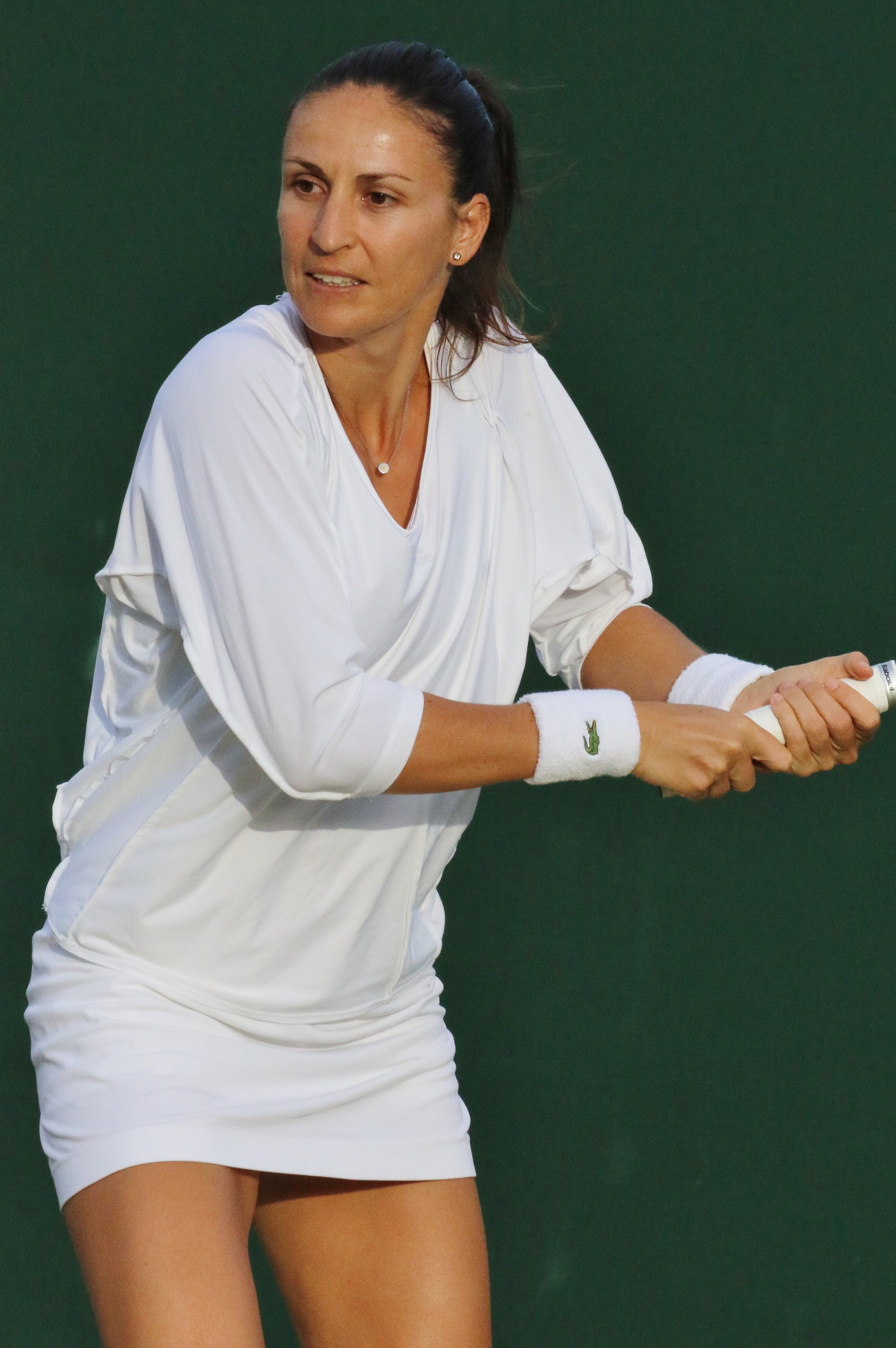
- Parra Santonja at the 2016 Wimbledon Championships
- Country (sports): Spain
- Residence: Barcelona, Spain
- Born: 9 November 1982 (age 42) Valencia, Spain
- Height: 1.76 m (5 ft 9 in)
- Turned pro: 2000
- Retired: May 2019
- Plays: Right (two-handed both sides)
- Prize money: US$ 2,315,104

Singles
- Career record: 386–331
- Career titles: 11 ITF
- Highest ranking: No. 46 (12 July 2010)

Grand Slam singles results
- Australian Open: 2R (2006)
- French Open: 3R (2004)
- Wimbledon: 2R (2003, 2004, 2009, 2010)
- US Open: 2R (2003, 2004)

Doubles
- Career record: 330–287
- Career titles: 11 WTA, 9 ITF
- Highest ranking: No. 22 (2 April 2012)

Grand Slam doubles results
- Australian Open: 3R (2013)
- French Open: QF (2014)
- Wimbledon: QF (2011)
- US Open: 2R (2011, 2014, 2015, 2016, 2017)

Grand Slam mixed doubles results
- Australian Open: 1R (2014, 2015)
- French Open: QF (2014)
- Wimbledon: 2R (2014)
- US Open: 1R (2014)

Team competitions
- Fed Cup: 4–0

Coaching career
- Jil Teichmann

Arantxa Parra Santonja (Spanish pronunciation: [aˈɾantʃa ˈpara sanˈtoŋxa]; born 9 November 1982) is a Spanish former tennis player. She turned professional in 2000 and retired in 2019.

In her career, Parra Santonja won eleven doubles titles on the WTA Tour. She reached career-high rankings of world No. 46 in singles and 22 in doubles.

== Significant finals ==
=== Premier Mandatory tournaments ===
==== Doubles: 1 (runner-up) ====
Result	Year	Tournament	Surface	Partner	Opponents	Score
Loss	2013	China Open	Hard	(Russia) Vera Dushevina	(Zimbabwe) Cara Black (India) Sania Mirza	2–6, 2–6

== WTA Tour finals ==
=== Singles: 2 (2 runner-ups) ===
Winner – Legend Grand Slam tournaments Premier M & Premier 5 Premier International (0–2)	Finals by surface Hard (0–0) Clay (0–2) Grass (0–0) Carpet (0–0)

Result	No.	Date	Tournament	Surface	Opponent	Score
Loss	1.	May 2010	Estoril Open, Portugal	Clay	(Latvia) Anastasija Sevastova	2–6, 5–7
Loss	2.	Feb 2011	Abierto Mexicano, Mexico	Clay	(Argentina) Gisela Dulko	3–6, 6–7^{(5–7)}

=== Doubles: 27 (11 titles, 16 runner-ups) ===
Winner – Legend WTA Elite Trophy (0–1) Tier I / Premier M & Premier 5 (0–1) Tier II / Premier (2–3) Tier III, IV & V / International (9–11)	Finals by surface Hard (3–8) Clay (7–7) Grass (1–1) Carpet (0–0)

Result	No.	Date	Tournament	Surface	Partner	Opponent	Score
Loss	1.	Jul 2003	Palermo Ladies Open, Italy	Clay	(Spain) María José Martínez Sánchez	(Italy) Adriana Serra Zanetti (Italy) Emily Stellato	4–6, 2–6
Loss	2.	Feb 2004	Copa Colsanitas, Colombia	Clay	(Spain) María José Martínez Sánchez	(Austria) Barbara Schwartz (Germany) Jasmin Wöhr	1–6, 3–6
Win	1.	Mar 2007	Mexican Open, Acapulco	Clay	(Spain) Lourdes Domínguez Lino	(France) Émilie Loit (Australia) Nicole Pratt	6–3, 6–3
Loss	3.	May 2007	Estoril Open, Portugal	Clay	(Spain) Lourdes Domínguez Lino	(Romania) Andreea Ehritt-Vanc (Russia) Anastasia Rodionova	3–6, 2–6
Win	2.	Jun 2007	Barcelona Open, Spain	Clay	(Spain) Nuria Llagostera Vives	(Spain) Lourdes Domínguez Lino (Italy) Flavia Pennetta	7–6, 2–6, [12–10]
Win	3.	Jun 2008	Barcelona Open, Spain	Clay	(Spain) Lourdes Domínguez Lino	(Spain) Nuria Llagostera Vives (Spain) María José Martínez Sánchez	4–6, 7–5, [10–4]
Loss	4.	Jan 2009	Auckland Open, New Zealand	Hard	(Spain) Nuria Llagostera Vives	(France) Nathalie Dechy (Italy) Mara Santangelo	6–4, 6–7^{(3–7)}, [10–12]
Loss	5.	Feb 2009	Mexican Open	Clay	(Spain) Lourdes Domínguez Lino	(Spain) Nuria Llagostera Vives (Spain) María José Martínez Sánchez	4–6, 2–6
Loss	6.	Jan 2010	Brisbane International, Australia	Hard	(Hungary) Melinda Czink	(Czech Republic) Andrea Hlaváčková (Czech Republic) Lucie Hradecká	6–2, 6–7^{(3–7)}, [4–10]
Loss	7.	Feb 2011	Mexican Open	Clay	(Spain) Lourdes Domínguez Lino	(Ukraine) Mariya Koryttseva (Romania) Raluca Olaru	7–5, 5–7, [7–10]
Win	4.	Apr 2011	Andalucia Tennis Experience, Spain	Clay	(Spain) Nuria Llagostera Vives	(Italy) Sara Errani (Italy) Roberta Vinci	3–6, 6–4, [10–5]
Loss	8.	Jul 2011	Båstad Open, Sweden	Clay	(Spain) Nuria Llagostera Vives	(Spain) Lourdes Domínguez Lino (Spain) María José Martínez Sánchez	3–6, 3–6
Win	5.	Jan 2012	Brisbane International, Australia	Hard	(Spain) Nuria Llagostera Vives	(United States) Raquel Kops-Jones (United States) Abigail Spears	7–6^{(7–2)}, 7–6^{(7–2)}
Loss	9.	Mar 2012	Mexican Open	Clay	(Spain) Lourdes Domínguez Lino	(Italy) Sara Errani (Italy) Roberta Vinci	2–6, 1–6
Win	6.	Mar 2013	Mexican Open	Clay	(Spain) Lourdes Domínguez Lino	(Colombia) Catalina Castaño (Colombia) Mariana Duque Mariño	6–4, 7–6^{(7–1)}
Loss	10.	Jun 2013	Rosmalen Open, Netherlands	Grass	(Slovakia) Dominika Cibulková	(Romania) Irina-Camelia Begu (Spain) Anabel Medina Garrigues	6–4, 6–7^{(3–7)}, [9–11]
Loss	11.	Oct 2013	China Open, Beijing	Hard	(Russia) Vera Dushevina	(Zimbabwe) Cara Black (India) Sania Mirza	2–6, 2–6
Win	7.	Jun 2014	Rosmalen Open	Grass	(New Zealand) Marina Erakovic	(Netherlands) Michaëlla Krajicek (France) Kristina Mladenovic	0–6, 7–6^{(7–5)}, [10–8]
Loss	12.	Aug 2014	Connecticut Open, United States	Hard	(New Zealand) Marina Erakovic	(Spain) Sílvia Soler Espinosa (Slovenia) Andreja Klepač	5–7, 6–4, [7–10]
Loss	13.	Oct 2014	Kremlin Cup, Russia	Hard (i)	(France) Caroline Garcia	(Switzerland) Martina Hingis (Italy) Flavia Pennetta	3–6, 7–5
Win	8.	Feb 2015	Diamond Games, Belgium	Hard (i)	(Spain) Anabel Medina Garrigues	(Belgium) An-Sophie Mestach (Belgium) Alison Van Uytvanck	6–4, 3–6, [10–5]
Loss	14.	Aug 2015	Stanford Classic, United States	Hard	(Spain) Anabel Medina Garrigues	(China) Xu Yifan (China) Zheng Saisai	1–6, 3–6
Loss	15.	Oct 2015	Luxembourg Open	Hard (i)	(Spain) Anabel Medina Garrigues	(Germany) Mona Barthel (Germany) Laura Siegemund	2–6, 6–7^{(2–7)}
Loss	16.	Nov 2015	WTA Elite Trophy, Zhuhai	Hard (i)	(Spain) Anabel Medina Garrigues	(China) Liang Chen (China) Wang Yafan	4–6, 3–6
Win	9.	Feb 2016	Mexican Open	Hard	(Spain) Anabel Medina Garrigues	(Netherlands) Kiki Bertens (Sweden) Johanna Larsson	6–0, 6–4
Win	10.	Mar 2016	Monterrey Open, Mexico	Hard	(Spain) Anabel Medina Garrigues	(Croatia) Petra Martić (United States) Maria Sanchez	4–6, 7–5, [10–7]
Win	11.	May 2016	Internationaux de Strasbourg, France	Clay	(Spain) Anabel Medina Garrigues	(Argentina) María Irigoyen (China) Liang Chen	6–2, 6–0

== ITF Circuit finals ==
$100,000 tournaments
$75,000 tournaments
$50,000 tournaments
$25,000 tournaments
$10,000 tournaments

=== Singles (11–6) ===
Result	No.	Date	Tournament	Surface	Opponent	Score
Win	1.	24 June 2001	ITF Montemor-o-Novo, Portugal	Hard	(Spain) Vanessa Devesa	6–2, 6–2
Win	2.	5 August 2001	ITF Pontevedra, Spain	Hard	(Portugal) Ana Catarina Nogueira	6–3, 6–1
Loss	1.	18 August 2001	ITF Koksijde, Belgium	Clay	(France) Marion Bartoli	2–6, 1–6
Loss	2.	26 August 2001	ITF Westende, Belgium	Clay	(Czech Republic) Lenka Snajdrová	2–6, 4–6
Win	3.	10 September 2001	ITF Madrid, Spain	Clay	(Italy) Anna Floris	3–6, 6–3, 6–0
Win	4.	23 September 2001	ITF Barcelona, Spain	Clay	(Germany) Ines Heise	6–3, 6–2
Win	5.	24 February 2002	ITF Vale do Lobo, Portugal	Hard	(Italy) Anna Floris	6–0, 6–4
Loss	3.	3 March 2002	ITF Albufeira, Portugal	Hard	(France) Amandine Dulon	3–6, 6–3, 4–6
Win	6.	29 September 2002	ITF Lecce, Italy	Clay	(Czech Republic) Lenka Němečková	6–3, 6–4
Win	7.	15 June 2003	Open de Marseille, France	Clay	(Luxembourg) Claudine Schaul	6–2, 6–1
Loss	4.	6 September 2005	Open Denain, France	Hard	(Russia) Lioudmila Skavronskaia	6–7^{(5)}, 0–6
Loss	5.	23 October 2006	Sant Cugat del Vallès, Spain	Clay	(Spain) María José Martínez Sánchez	2–6, 4–6
Win	8.	13 October 2008	ITF Mexico City, Mexico	Hard	(Argentina) Soledad Esperón	6–2, 6–2
Loss	6.	29 November 2008	ITF Saint-Denis, France	Hard	(Austria) Patricia Mayr-Achleitner	4–6, 1–6
Win	9.	26 July 2009	Pétange, Luxembourg	Clay	(Russia) Ekaterina Bychkova	6–3, 6–2
Win	10.	27 September 2009	Open de Saint-Malo, France	Clay	(Romania) Alexandra Dulgheru	6–4, 6–3
Win	11.	14 May 2012	ITF Casablanca, Morocco	Clay	(Ukraine) Olga Savchuk	6–4, 6–4

=== Doubles (9–11) ===
Result	No.	Date	Tournament	Surface	Partner	Opponents	Score
Loss	1.	25 June 2001	ITF Elvas, Portugal	Hard	(Ukraine) Oleksandra Kravets	(Brazil) Maria Fernanda Alves (Portugal) Ana Catarina Nogueira	3–6, 4–6
Loss	2.	30 July 2001	ITF Pontevedra, Spain	Hard	(Ukraine) Oleksandra Kravets	(Netherlands) Natasha Galouza (Netherlands) Jolanda Mens	6–7^{(5)}, 2–6
Loss	3.	20 August 2001	ITF Westende, Belgium	Clay	(Ukraine) Oleksandra Kravets	(Belarus) Evgenia Subbotina (France) Kildine Chevalier	5–7, 5–7
Win	1.	23 September 2001	ITF Barcelona, Spain	Clay	(Spain) Anna Font	(Spain) María José Sánchez Alayeto (Croatia) Lana Popadić	6–1, 6–2
Win	2.	25 March 2002	ITF San Luis Potosí, Mexico	Clay	(Czech Republic) Dominika Luzarová	(Brazil) Vanessa Menga (Brazil) Carla Tiene	7–5, 4–6, 6–3
Loss	4.	17 June 2002	ITF Gorizia, Italy	Clay	(Brazil) Carla Tiene	(Serbia and Montenegro) Sandra Načuk (Slovenia) Tina Hergold	4–6, 3–6
Win	3.	8 June 2003	ITF Galatina, Italy	Clay	(Argentina) María Emilia Salerni	(Morocco) Bahia Mouhtassine (Romania) Andreea Ehritt-Vanc	6–0, 7–6^{(6)}
Loss	5.	19 April 2005	Open de Valencia, Spain	Hard	(Spain) Rosa María Andrés Rodríguez	(France) Kildine Chevalier (France) Stéphanie Foretz	6–4, 6–7^{(5)}, 2–6
Win	4.	30 October 2005	ITF Sant Cugat, Spain	Clay	(Spain) Lourdes Domínguez Lino	(Spain) Conchita Martínez Granados (Spain) María José Martínez Sánchez	6–4, 6–3
Loss	6.	30 March 2007	ITF La Palma, Spain	Hard	(United Kingdom) Melanie South	(Czech Republic) Petra Cetkovská (Czech Republic) Andrea Hlaváčková	3–6, 2–6
Loss	7.	20 April 2007	ITF Calvià, Spain	Clay	(Spain) María José Martínez Sánchez	(Czech Republic) Petra Cetkovská (Czech Republic) Andrea Hlaváčková	5–7, 4–6
Win	5.	6 July 2007	ITF Valladolid, Spain	Hard	(Spain) Nuria Llagostera Vives	(Germany) Ria Dörnemann (Germany) Justine Ozga	6–0, 6–2
Win	6.	17 September 2007	ITF Madrid, Spain	Clay	(Spain) María José Martínez Sánchez	(Romania) Monica Niculescu (Ukraine) Yevgenia Savranska	6–1, 7–6^{(4)}
Loss	8.	31 March 2008	ITF Patras, Greece	Clay	(Spain) María José Martínez Sánchez	(Israel) Tzipora Obziler (Belarus) Anastasiya Yakimova	5–7, 1–6
Loss	9.	7 April 2008	ITF Monzón, Spain	Hard	(Spain) María José Martínez Sánchez	(Japan) Rika Fujiwara (Switzerland) Emmanuelle Gagliardi	6–1, 6–7^{(5)}, 8–10
Win	7.	14 April 2008	Saint-Malo, France	Clay	(Spain) María José Martínez Sánchez	(Czech Republic) Renata Voráčová (Belarus) Anastasiya Yakimova	6–2, 6–1
Loss	10.	18 July 2008	ITF Biella, Italy	Clay	(Spain) Lourdes Domínguez Lino	(Czech Republic) Barbora Strýcová (Czech Republic) Renata Voráčová	6–4, 0–6, [5–10]
Loss	11.	21 September 2008	Sofia Cup, Bulgaria	Clay	(Spain) Lourdes Domínguez Lino	(Estonia) Maret Ani (Czech Republic) Renata Voráčová	6–7^{(4)}, 6–7^{(9)}
Win	8.	29 September 2008	ITF Cali, Colombia	Clay	(Argentina) Betina Jozami	(Portugal) Frederica Piedade (Belarus) Anastasiya Yakimova	6–3, 6–1
Win	9.	11 October 2012	ITF Sant Cugat del Valles, Spain	Clay	(Spain) Leticia Costas	(Ukraine) Inés Ferrer Suárez (Netherlands) Richèl Hogenkamp	6–3, 6–3

== Grand Slam performance timelines ==
Key
W	F	SF	QF	#R	RR	Q#	DNQ	A	NH

(W) winner; (F) finalist; (SF) semifinalist; (QF) quarterfinalist; (#R) rounds 4, 3, 2, 1; (RR) round-robin stage; (Q#) qualification round; (DNQ) did not qualify; (A) absent; (NH) not held; (SR) strike rate (events won / competed); (W–L) win–loss record.

=== Singles ===
Tournament	2002	2003	2004	2005	2006	2007	2008	2009	2010	2011	2012	2013	2014	2015	2016	2017	2018	SR	W–L
Australian Open	A	Q1	1R	1R	2R	Q1	A	A	1R	1R	Q2	Q2	A	A	A	A	A	0 / 5	1–5
French Open	A	Q1	3R	2R	1R	A	A	A	2R	1R	Q2	Q3	A	A	A	A	A	0 / 5	4–5
Wimbledon	A	2R	2R	1R	Q2	A	A	2R	2R	1R	A	A	A	A	A	A	A	0 / 6	4–6
US Open	Q1	2R	2R	1R	Q1	A	A	A	1R	Q1	A	Q1	A	A	A	A		0 / 4	2–4
Win–loss	0–0	2–2	4–4	1–4	1–2	0–0	0–0	2–3	2–4	0–3	0–0	0–0	0–0	0–0	0–0	0–0	0–0	0 / 20	11–20

=== Doubles ===
Tournament	2004	2005	2006	2007	2008	2009	2010	2011	2012	2013	2014	2015	2016	2017	2018	2019	SR	W–L
Australian Open	A	1R	A	A	1R	2R	1R	1R	2R	3R	2R	1R	3R	A	2R	1R	0 / 12	8–12
French Open	1R	2R	A	2R	1R	2R	1R	2R	3R	2R	QF	1R	1R	1R	2R	A	0 / 14	11–14
Wimbledon	1R	1R	A	2R	1R	1R	1R	QF	1R	1R	1R	3R	3R	2R	2R	A	0 / 14	10–14
US Open	1R	A	A	1R	1R	1R	1R	2R	A	1R	2R	2R	2R	2R	1R	A	0 / 12	5–12
Win–loss	0–3	1–3	0–0	2–3	0–4	2–4	0–4	5–4	3–3	4–4	5–4	3–4	5–4	2–3	3–4	0–1	0 / 52	34–52
