= 1994 Federation Cup Europe/Africa Zone – Pool A =

Group A of the 1994 Federation Cup Europe/Africa Zone was one of eight pools in the Europe/Africa zone of the 1994 Federation Cup. Three teams competed in a round robin competition, with the top two teams qualifying for the knockout stage.

	(Belgium) BEL	(Turkey) TUR	(Estonia) EST	RR; W–L	Set; W–L	Game; W–L	Standings
Belgium		3–0	3–0	2–0	12–1	78–26	1
Turkey	0–3		2–1	1–1	5–7	53–70	2
Estonia	0–3	1–2		0–2	2–10	32–67	3

== Belgium vs. Turkey ==
Belgium
3
Freizeit Park, Bad Waltersdorf, Austria
19 April 1994
Red clay (outdoors)

Turkey
0

			1	2	3
1	(Belgium) (Turkey)	Laurence Courtois; Duygu Akşit Oal	7; 5	6; 0
2	(Belgium) (Turkey)	Dominique Monami; Stela Penciu	6; 4	6; 2
3	(Belgium) (Turkey)	Els Callens / Dominique Monami; Duygu Akşit Oal / Stela Penciu	5; 7	6; 4	6; 0

== Turkey vs. Estonia ==
Turkey
2
Freizeit Park, Bad Waltersdorf, Austria
20 April 1994
Red clay (outdoors)

Estonia
1

			1	2	3
1	(Turkey) (Estonia)	Duygu Akşit Oal; Helina Lill	6; 3	6; 2
2	(Turkey) (Estonia)	Stela Penciu; Helene Holter	4; 6	1; 6
3	(Turkey) (Estonia)	Duygu Akşit Oal / Stela Penciu; Helene Holter / Helina Lill	7; 5	7^{7} 6^{5}

== Belgium vs. Estonia ==
Belgium
3
Freizeit Park, Bad Waltersdorf, Austria
21 April 1994
Red clay (outdoors)

Estonia
0

			1	2	3
1	(Belgium) (Estonia)	Dominique Monami; Kristina Grunberg	6; 1	6; 0
2	(Belgium) (Estonia)	Sabine Appelmans; Helina Lill	6; 1	6; 0
3	(Belgium) (Estonia)	Sabine Appelmans / Els Callens; Helene Holter / Helina Lill	6; 0	6; 2

== See also ==
- Fed Cup structure
