= 1994 Federation Cup Europe/Africa Zone – Pool E =

Group E of the 1994 Federation Cup Europe/Africa Zone was one of eight pools in the Europe/Africa zone of the 1994 Federation Cup. Three teams competed in a round robin competition, with the top two teams qualifying for the knockout stage.

	(Slovakia) SVK	(Greece) GRE	(Lithuania) LTU	RR; W–L	Set; W–L	Game; W–L	Standings
Slovakia		3–0	3–0	2–0	10–0	61–11	1
Greece	0–3		2–1	1–1	5–5	43–40	2
Lithuania	0–3	1–2		0–2	0–6	19–72	3

== Slovakia vs. Lithuania ==
Slovakia
3
Freizeit Park, Bad Waltersdorf, Austria
18 April 1994
Red clay (outdoors)

Lithuania
0

			1	2	3
1	(Slovakia) (Lithuania)	Radka Zrubáková; Rūta Deduraitė	6; 0	6; 0
2	(Slovakia) (Lithuania)	Karina Habšudová; Galina Misiuriova	6; 2	6; 0
3	(Slovakia) (Lithuania)	Janette Husárová / Radka Zrubáková; Rūta Deduraitė / Odeta Naujokaitė	6; 2	6; 0

== Greece vs. Lithuania ==
Greece
2
Freizeit Park, Bad Waltersdorf, Austria
20 April 1994
Red clay (outdoors)

Lithuania
1

			1	2	3
1	(Greece) (Lithuania)	Christina Zachariadou; Odeta Naujokaitė	6; 2	6; 0
2	(Greece) (Lithuania)	Christína Papadáki; Galina Misiuriova	6; 1	6^{5} 7^{7}		retired
3	(Greece) (Lithuania)	Alexandra Rentzoula / Christina Zachariadou; Rūta Deduraitė / Galina Misiuriova	6; 3	6; 2

== Slovakia vs. Greece ==
Slovakia
3
Freizeit Park, Bad Waltersdorf, Austria
21 April 1994
Red clay (outdoors)

Greece
0

			1	2	3
1	(Slovakia) (Greece)	Radka Zrubáková; Alexandra Rentzoula	7; 5	6; 0
2	(Slovakia) (Greece)	Janette Husárová; Christina Zachariadou	6; 2	6; 0
3	(Slovakia) (Greece)	Karina Habšudová / Radka Zrubáková; Alexandra Rentzoula / Christina Zachariadou				w/o

== See also ==
- Fed Cup structure
