= 1994 Federation Cup Europe/Africa Zone – Pool D =

International tennis competition

Group D of the 1994 Federation Cup Europe/Africa Zone was one of eight pools in the Europe/Africa zone of the 1994 Federation Cup. Three teams competed in a round robin competition, with the top two teams qualifying for the knockout stage.

	(Romania) ROU	(Hungary) HUN	(Norway) NOR	RR; W–L	Set; W–L	Game; W–L	Standings
Romania		2–1	3–0	2–0	11–0	69–27	1
Hungary	1–2		3–0	1–1	6–6	57–50	2
Norway	0–3	0–3		0–2	1–12	27–76	3

== Romania vs. Norway ==
Romania
3
Freizeit Park, Bad Waltersdorf, Austria
18 April 1994
Red clay (outdoors)

Norway
0

			1	2	3
1	(Romania) (Norway)	Ruxandra Dragomir; Mette Sigmundstad	6; 2	6; 1
2	(Romania) (Norway)	Irina Spîrlea; Linda Beate Andersen	6; 1	6; 4
3	(Romania) (Norway)	Cătălina Cristea / Irina Spîrlea; Linda Beate Andersen / Karoline Borgersen	6; 2	1; 0

== Hungary vs. Norway ==
Hungary
3
Freizeit Park, Bad Waltersdorf, Austria
19 April 1994
Red clay (outdoors)

Norway
0

			1	2	3
1	(Hungary) (Norway)	Rita Kuti-Kis; Mette Sigmundstad	6; 3	6; 0
2	(Hungary) (Norway)	Petra Gáspár; Linda Beate Andersen	6; 1	6; 4
3	(Hungary) (Norway)	Rita Kuti-Kis / Petra Mandula; Linda Beate Andersen / Mette Sigmundstad	6; 3	4; 6	6; 0

== Romania vs. Hungary ==
Romania
3
Freizeit Park, Bad Waltersdorf, Austria
21 April 1994
Red clay (outdoors)

Hungary
0

			1	2	3
1	(Romania) (Hungary)	Ruxandra Dragomir; Rita Kuti-Kis	6; 1	4; 6	6; 4
2	(Romania) (Hungary)	Irina Spîrlea; Petra Gáspár	6; 1	7^{7} 6^{5}
3	(Romania) (Hungary)	Cătălina Cristea / Irina Spîrlea; Rita Kuti-Kis / Petra Mandula	6; 3	6; 3

== See also ==
- Fed Cup structure
