= 1996 Warsaw Cup by Heros =

- Date: 16–22 September
- Edition: 2nd
- Category: Tier III
- Draw: 32S / 16D
- Surface: Clay / outdoor
- Location: Warsaw, Poland

Champions

Singles
- (Slovakia) Henrieta Nagyová

Doubles
- (Ukraine) Olga Lugina / (Bulgaria) Elena Pampoulova
← 1995 ·	Warsaw Open	· 1997 →

The 1996 Warsaw Cup by Heros was a women's tennis tournament played on outdoor clay courts at the Warszawianka Tennis Centre in Warsaw, Poland that was part of Tier III of the 1996 WTA Tour. It was the second edition of the tournament and was held from 16 September until 22 September 1996. Unseeded Henrieta Nagyová won the singles title.

== Finals ==
=== Singles ===
(Slovakia) Henrieta Nagyová defeated (Austria) Barbara Paulus 3–6, 6–2, 6–1

- It was Nagyová's only title of the year and the 1st of her career.

=== Doubles ===
(Ukraine) Olga Lugina / (Bulgaria) Elena Pampoulova defeated (France) Alexandra Fusai / (Italy) Laura Garrone 1–6, 6–4, 7–5

- It was Lugina's only title of the year and the 1st of her career. It was Pampoulova's only title of the year and the 2nd of her career.
