= List of Poland Fed Cup team representatives =

This is a list of tennis players who have represented the Poland Fed Cup team in an official Fed Cup match. Poland have taken part in the competition since 1966.

== Players ==
Player	W-L (Total)	W-L (Singles)	W-L (Doubles)	Ties	Debut
Anna Bieleń-Żarska	6 – 7	3 – 3	3 – 4	9	1999
Sylwia Czopek	1 – 1	-	1 – 1	2	1989
Marta Domachowska	8 – 10	5 – 6	3 – 4	10	2003
Dorota Dziekonska	2 – 2	1 – 1	1 – 1	3	1980
Magdalena Feistel	23 – 20	8 – 12	15 – 8	24	1988
Magdalena Fręch	3 – 3	3 – 3	-	6	2016
Magdalena Grzybowska	8 – 10	6 – 7	2 – 3	13	1995
Klaudia Jans-Ignacik	20 – 12	0 – 1	20 – 11	33	2002
Paula Kania	2 – 5	0 – 3	2 – 2	6	2013
Katarzyna Kawa	0 – 1	-	0 – 1	1	2016
Karolina Kosińska	3 – 5	2 – 5	1 – 0	7	2004
Barbara Kral	4 – 4	3 – 2	1 – 2	5	1974
Iwona Kuczyńska	1 – 3	0 – 2	1 – 1	3	1980
Magda Linette	9 – 8	5 – 7	4 – 1	13	2011
Katarzyna Nowak	10 – 11	9 – 10	1 – 1	19	1988
Aleksandra Olsza	16 – 9	11 – 5	5 – 4	16	1995
Barbara Olszowska	1 – 4	1 – 2	0 – 2	3	1966
Katarzyna Piter	7 – 6	4 – 5	3 – 1	9	2009
Agnieszka Radwańska	42 – 11	34 – 9	8 – 2	35	2006
Urszula Radwańska	15 – 15	12 – 13	3 – 2	22	2006
Ewa Radzikowska	2 – 1	0 – 1	2 – 0	3	1996
Malgorzata Rejdych	1 – 1	-	1 – 1	2	1974
Alicja Rosolska	23 – 11	-	23 – 11	36	2004
Danuta Rylska	0 – 2	0 – 1	0 – 1	1	1966
Sylwia Rynarzewska	0 – 2	-	0 – 2	2	1998
Joanna Sakowicz-Kostecka	9 – 16	5 – 12	4 – 4	20	2000
Monika Schneider	0 – 3	0 – 1	0 – 2	2	2000
Malgorzata Sieradzka	1 – 1	1 – 1	-	2	1980
Renata Skrzypczyńska	4 – 9	0 – 4	4 – 5	10	1986
Elzbieta Slesicka	6 – 4	4 – 1	2 – 3	5	1974
Monika Starosta	0 – 2	0 – 1	0 – 1	1	1997
Katarzyna Strączy	4 – 10	2 – 8	2 – 2	11	1997
Iga Świątek	1 – 1	1 – 0	0 – 1	2	2018
Katarzyna Teodorowicz-Lisowska	13 – 12	1 – 2	12 – 10	22	1991
Monika Waniek	1 – 4	1 – 2	0 – 2	3	1986
Danuta Wieczorek	2 – 1	2 – 0	0 – 1	2	1968
Ewa Zerdecka	5 – 8	3 – 3	2 – 5	8	1986
