= 1994 Federation Cup Europe/Africa Zone – Pool G =

Group G of tennis's 1994 Federation Cup Europe/Africa Zone was one of eight pools in the Europe/Africa zone of the 1994 Federation Cup. Three teams competed in a round robin competition, with the top two teams qualifying for the knockout stage.

	(Belarus) BLR	(Israel) ISR	(Egypt) EGY	RR; W–L	Set; W–L	Game; W–L	Standings
Belarus		3–0	3–0	2–0	12–1	76–31	1
Israel	0–3		3–0	1–1	7–6	60–43	2
Egypt	0–3	0–3		0–2	0–12	10–72	3

== Israel vs. Egypt ==
Israel
3
Freizeit Park, Bad Waltersdorf, Austria
18 April 1994
Red clay (outdoors)

Egypt
0

			1	2	3
1	(Israel) (Egypt)	Hila Rosen; Marwa El Wany	6; 0	6; 0
2	(Israel) (Egypt)	Anna Smashnova; Shahira Tawfik	6; 1	6; 1
3	(Israel) (Egypt)	Shiri Burstein / Tzipora Obziler; Amira El Borolossy / Mehry Shawki	6; 0	6; 1

== Belarus vs. Israel ==
Belarus
3
Freizeit Park, Bad Waltersdorf, Austria
19 April 1994
Red clay (outdoors)

Israel
0

			1	2	3
1	(Belarus) (Israel)	Tatiana Ignatieva; Hila Rosen	7; 5	3; 6	6; 2
2	(Belarus) (Israel)	Natasha Zvereva; Anna Smashnova	6; 3	6; 2
3	(Belarus) (Israel)	Tatiana Ignatieva / Natasha Zvereva; Shiri Burstein / Tzipora Obziler	6; 3	6; 3

== Belarus vs. Egypt ==
Belarus
3
Freizeit Park, Bad Waltersdorf, Austria
20 April 1994
Red clay (outdoors)

Egypt
0

			1	2	3
1	(Belarus) (Egypt)	Tatiana Ignatieva; Mehry Shawki	6; 2	6; 0
2	(Belarus) (Egypt)	Natasha Zvereva; Shahira Tawfik	6; 3	6; 0
3	(Belarus) (Egypt)	Tatiana Ignatieva / Natasha Zvereva; Amira El Borolossy / Shahira Tawfik	6; 1	6; 1

== See also ==
- Fed Cup structure
