= 1994 Federation Cup Europe/Africa Zone – Pool B =

Group B of the 1994 Federation Cup Europe/Africa Zone was one of eight pools in the Europe/Africa zone of the 1994 Federation Cup. Three teams competed in a round robin competition, with the top two teams qualifying for the knockout stage.

	(Austria) AUT	(Portugal) POR	(Malta) MLT	RR; W–L	Set; W–L	Game; W–L	Standings
Austria		3–0	3–0	2–0	12–1	79–35	1
Portugal	0–3		3–0	1–1	7–6	60–61	2
Malta	0–3	0–3		0–2	0–12	31–74	3

== Austria vs. Malta ==
Austria
3
Freizeit Park, Bad Waltersdorf, Austria
19 April 1994
Red clay (outdoors)

Malta
0

			1	2	3
1	(Austria) (Malta)	Barbara Schett; Carol Cassar-Torreggiani	6; 1	7^{7} 6^{2}
2	(Austria) (Malta)	Judith Wiesner; Helen Asciak	6; 0	6; 0
3	(Austria) (Malta)	Sylvia Plischke / Petra Schwarz; Lisa Camenzuli / Carol Cassar-Torreggiani	6; 4	6; 1

== Austria vs. Portugal ==
Austria
3
Freizeit Park, Bad Waltersdorf, Austria
20 April 1994
Red clay (outdoors)

Portugal
0

			1	2	3
1	(Austria) (Portugal)	Barbara Schett; Joana Pedroso	4; 6	7; 5	6; 2
2	(Austria) (Portugal)	Judith Wiesner; Sofia Prazeres	6; 1	7^{7} 6^{1}
3	(Austria) (Portugal)	Petra Schwarz / Barbara Schett; Joana Pedroso / Sofia Prazeres	6; 1	6; 2

== Portugal vs. Malta ==
Portugal
3
Freizeit Park, Bad Waltersdorf, Austria
21 April 1994
Red clay (outdoors)

Malta
0

			1	2	3
1	(Portugal) (Malta)	Joana Pedroso; Lisa Camenzuli	6; 4	6; 4
2	(Portugal) (Malta)	Sofia Prazeres; Carol Cassar-Torreggiani	6; 3	6; 0
3	(Portugal) (Malta)	Joana Pedroso / Sofia Prazeres; Helen Asciak / Carol Cassar-Torreggiani	6; 3	7; 5

== See also ==
- Fed Cup structure
