= 1994 Federation Cup Europe/Africa Zone – Pool C =

Group C of the 1994 Federation Cup Europe/Africa Zone was one of eight pools in the Europe/Africa zone of the 1994 Federation Cup. Three teams competed in a round robin competition, with the top two teams qualifying for the knockout stage.

	(Georgia (country)) GEO	(Ukraine) UKR	(Tunisia) TUN	RR; W–L	Set; W–L	Game; W–L	Standings
Georgia		2–1	3–0	2–0	10–2	65–21	1
Ukraine	1–2		3–0	1–1	8–4	52–33	2
Tunisia	0–3	0–3		0–2	0–12	9–72	3

== Georgia vs. Tunisia ==
Georgia
3
Freizeit Park, Bad Waltersdorf, Austria
18 April 1994
Red clay (outdoors)

Tunisia
0

			1	2	3
1	(Georgia (country)) (Tunisia)	Nino Louarsabishvili; Imen Ben Larbi	6; 1	6; 2
2	(Georgia (country)) (Tunisia)	Leila Meskhi; Aicha Ferjani	6; 0	6; 0
3	(Georgia (country)) (Tunisia)	Victoria Bakhtadze / Nino Louarsabishvili; Imen Ben Larbi / Aicha Ferjani	6; 2	6; 0

== Ukraine vs. Tunisia ==
Ukraine
3
Freizeit Park, Bad Waltersdorf, Austria
19 April 1994
Red clay (outdoors)

Tunisia
0

			1	2	3
1	(Ukraine) (Tunisia)	Elena Tatarkova; Imen Ben Larbi	6; 1	6; 1
2	(Ukraine) (Tunisia)	Natalia Medvedeva; Aicha Ferjani	6; 1	6; 1
3	(Ukraine) (Tunisia)	Natalia Medvedeva / Elena Tatarkova; Imen Ben Larbi / Aicha Ferjani	6; 0	6; 0

== Georgia vs. Ukraine ==
Georgia
2
Freizeit Park, Bad Waltersdorf, Austria
21 April 1994
Red clay (outdoors)

Ukraine
1

			1	2	3
1	(Georgia (country)) (Ukraine)	Nino Louarsabishvili; Elena Tatarkova	2; 6	3; 6
2	(Georgia (country)) (Ukraine)	Leila Meskhi; Natalia Medvedeva	6; 1	6; 1
3	(Georgia (country)) (Ukraine)	Nino Louarsabishvili / Leila Meskhi; Olga Lugina / Natalia Medvedeva	6; 2	6; 0

== See also ==
- Fed Cup structure
