= Sylwia Rynarzewska =

Polish tennis player

- Country (sports): Poland
- Born: 14 June 1976 (age 49)
- Prize money: $24,456

Singles
- Highest ranking: No. 442 (20 July 1998)

Doubles
- Highest ranking: No. 335 (10 November 1997)

Sylwia Rynarzewska (born 14 June 1976) is a former professional tennis player from Poland.

Rynarzewska competed mostly on the ITF circuit, with her only WTA Tour main draw appearance coming in the doubles at the Polish Open in 1998.

As a member of Poland's Fed Cup team, Rynarzewska played doubles in two ties in 1998, against Great Britain and Greece.

== ITF finals ==
=== Singles (0–4) ===
Result	No.	Date	Tournament	Surface	Opponent	Score
Loss	1.	5 June 1994	Bytom, Poland	Clay	(Czech Republic) Karolina Petříková	2–6, 0–6
Loss	2.	3 October 1994	Kyiv, Ukraine	Clay	(Ukraine) Talina Beiko	2–6, 4–6
Loss	3.	20 July 1997	Toruń, Poland	Clay	(Sweden) Annica Lindstedt	1–6, 0–6
Loss	4.	16 August 1999	Bucharest, Romania	Clay	(Switzerland) Aliénor Tricerri	3–6, 0–6

=== Doubles (0–1) ===
Result	No.	Date	Tournament	Surface	Partner	Opponents	Score
Loss	1.	19 June 1994	Maribor, Slovenia	Clay	(Poland) Monika Starosta	(Slovakia) Henrieta Nagyová (Czech Republic) Veronika Šafářová	5–7, 0–6

== See also ==
- List of Poland Fed Cup team representatives
