= Russia Billie Jean King Cup team =

Russian women's tennis team

Russia
- Captain: Igor Andreev
- Nations Ranking: 38 (15 November 2023) (suspended)
- Colors: red & white
- First year: 1968
- Years played: 43
- Ties played (W–L): 137 (92–44)
- Years in World Group: 33 (52–28)
- Titles: 5 (2004, 2005, 2007, 2008, 2021)
- Runners-up: 7 (1988, 1990, 1999, 2001; 2011, 2013, 2015)
- Most total wins: Larisa Savchenko (40–11)
- Most singles wins: Elena Dementieva (22–5)
- Most doubles wins: Larisa Savchenko (23–3)
- Best doubles team: Larisa Savchenko / Natasha Zvereva (12–1)
- Most ties played: Larisa Savchenko (32)
- Most years played: Elena Vesnina (11)

The Russia Billie Jean King Cup team represented Russia in Billie Jean King Cup tennis competition and are governed by the Russian Tennis Federation. They compete in the World Group. Following the 2020 ban of Russia by the World Anti-Doping Agency (WADA) and the Court of Arbitration for Sport (CAS), it competed and won the 2020–21 Billie Jean King Cup under the RTF flag and name. After the Russian invasion of Ukraine, the International Tennis Federation suspended Russia from Billie Jean King Cup competitions.

From 1968 until 1991, the team represented the Soviet Union. With the dissolution of that country, it started to represent the Commonwealth of Independent States in 1992 until 1995, when it started to represent the Russian Federation.

== Current team ==
As of November 7, 2021

Name	DOB	First	Last	Ties	Win/Loss			Ranks	
Name	DOB	First	Last	Ties	Sin	Dou	Tot	Sin	Dou
Anastasia Pavlyuchenkova	July 3, 1991	2009	2021	17	11–10	5–2	16–12	12	108
Daria Kasatkina	May 7, 1997	2016	2021	7	5–1	2–2	7–3	26	281
Veronika Kudermetova	April 24, 1997	2014	2021	6	0–3	3–1	3–4	32	16
Ekaterina Alexandrova	November 15, 1994	2020	2021	2	2–1	—	2–1	30	146
Liudmila Samsonova	November 11, 1998	2021	2021	4	2–0	3–0	5–0	40	1329

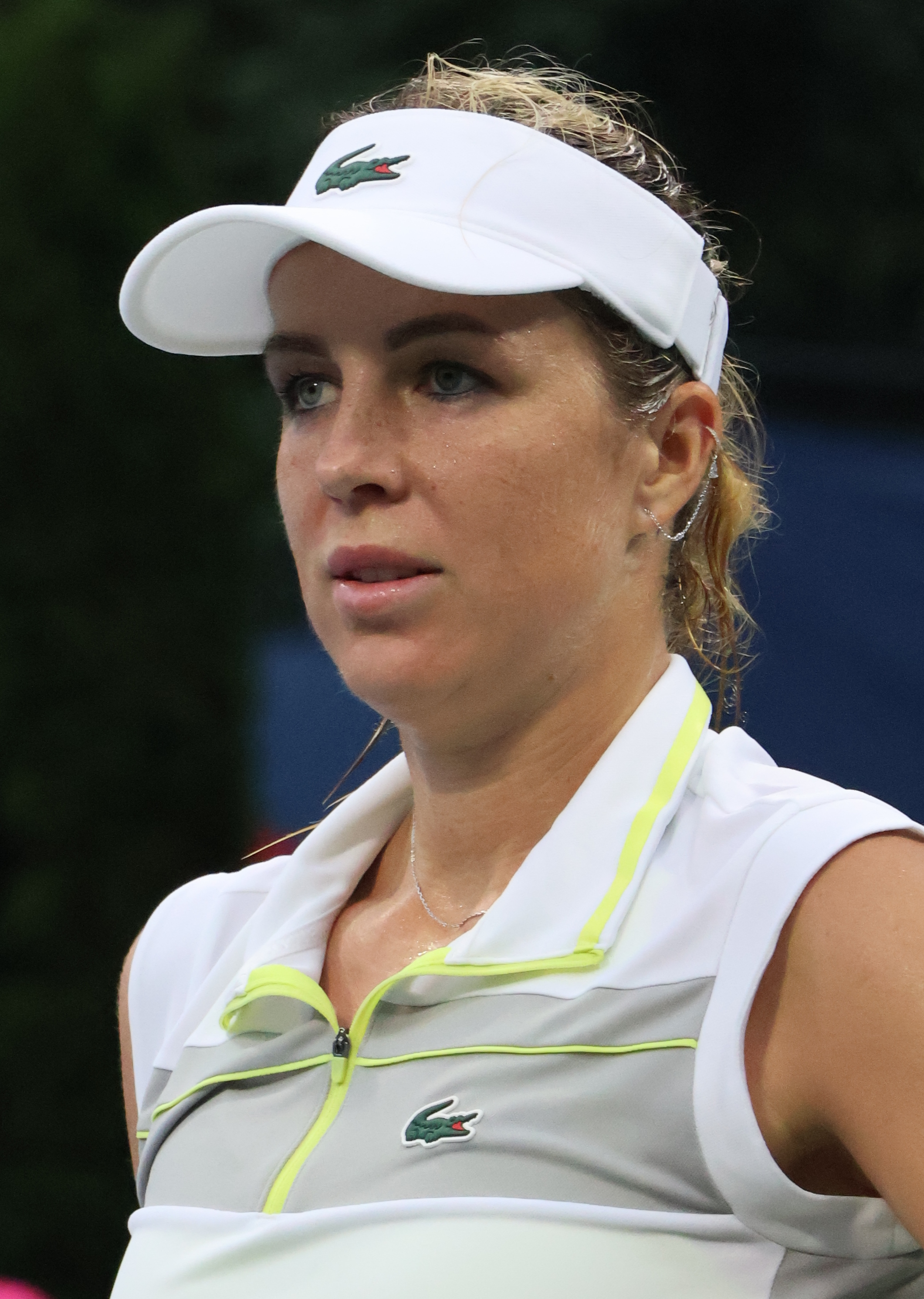
Anastasia Pavlyuchenkova

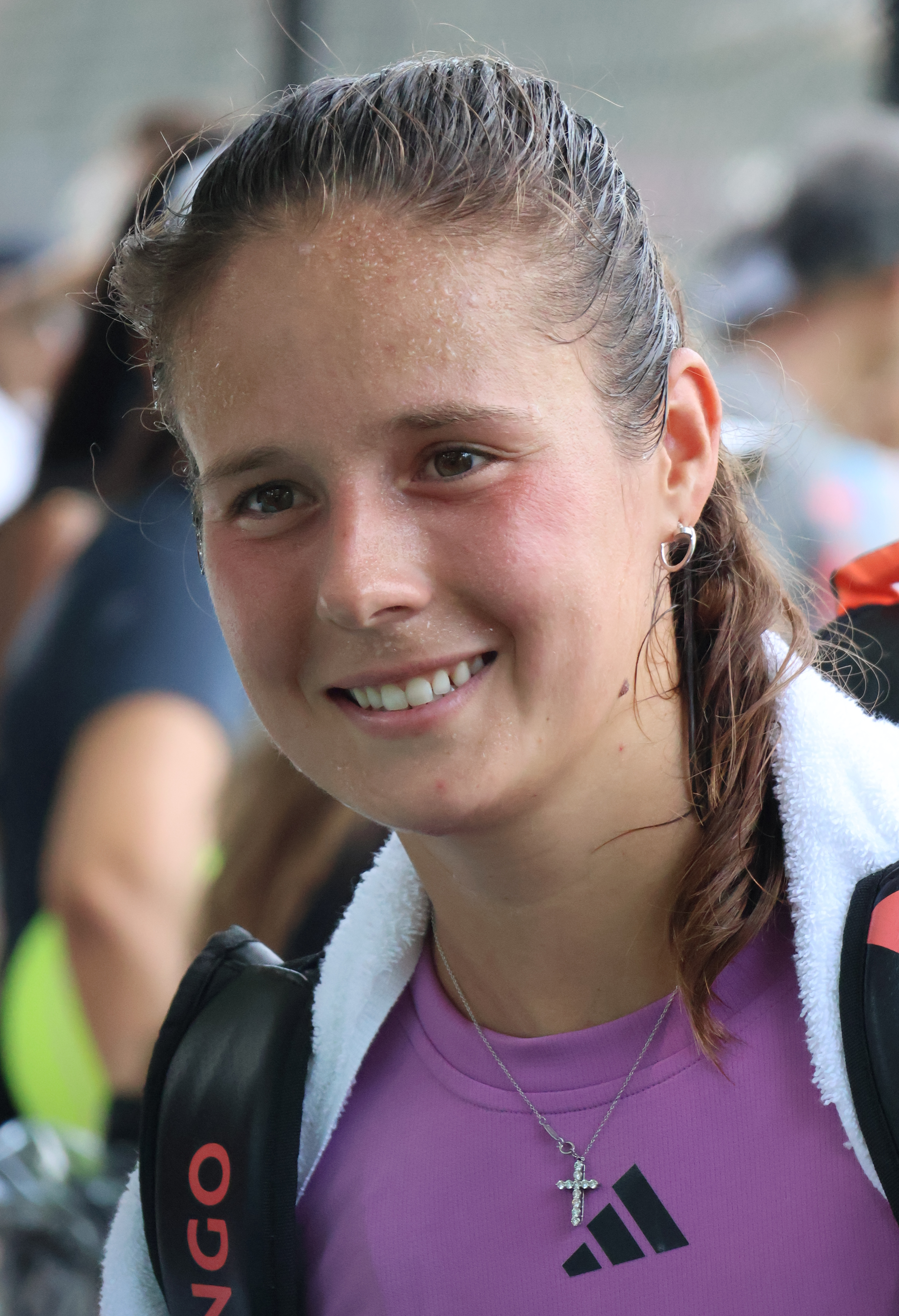
Daria Kasatkina

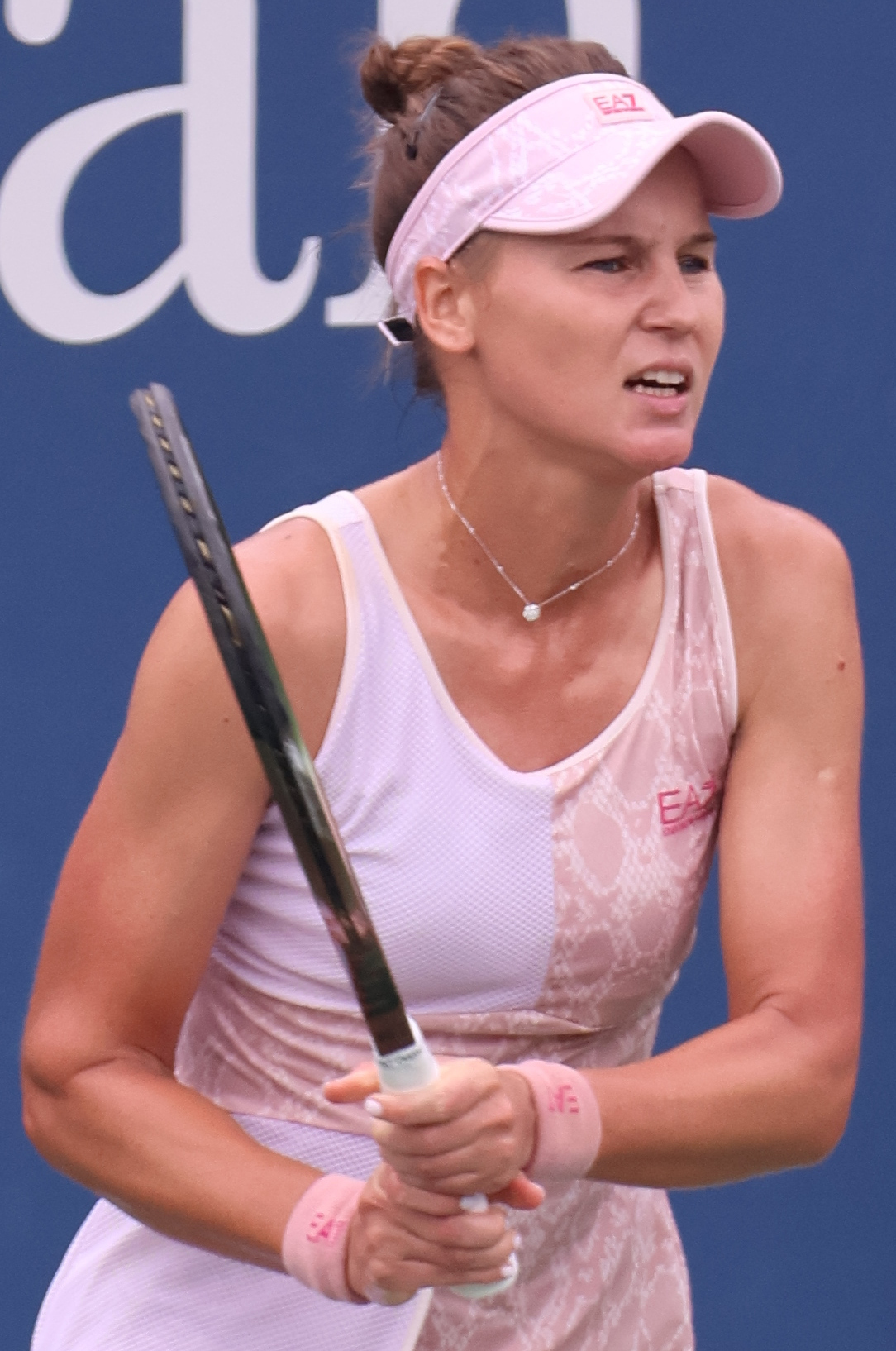
Veronika Kudermetova

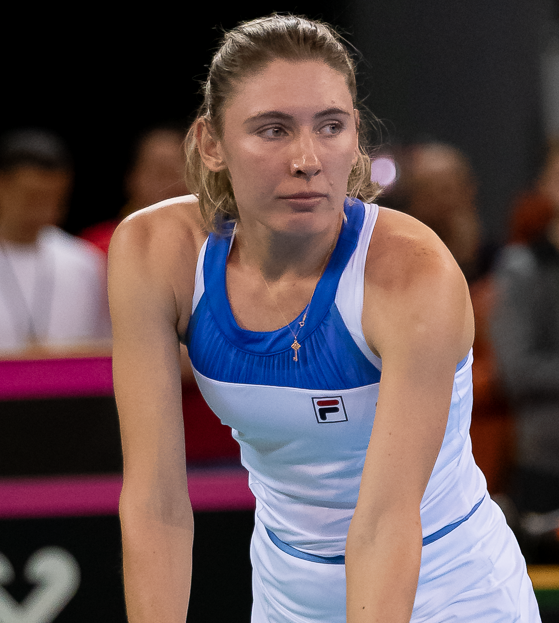
Ekaterina Alexandrova

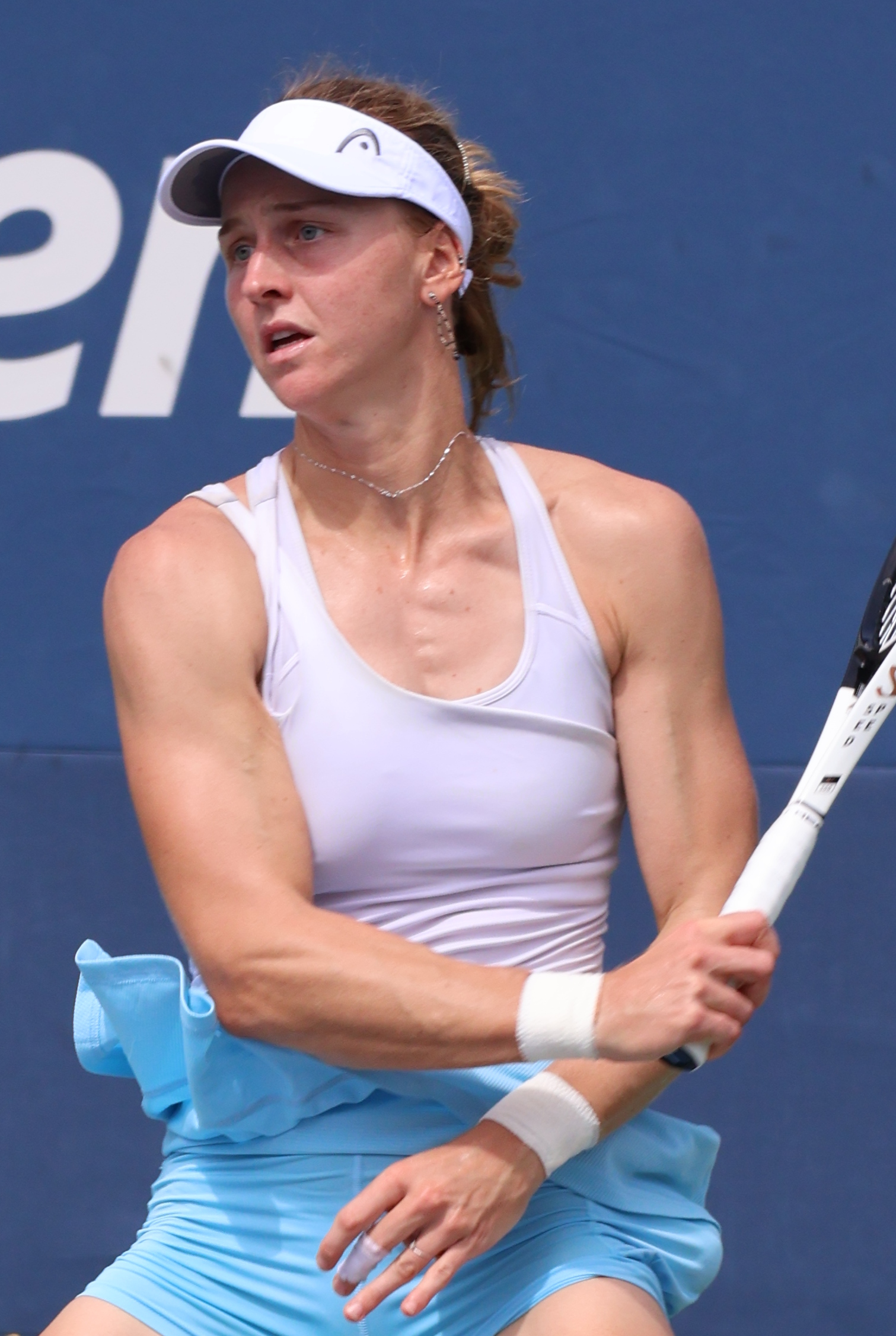
Liudmila Samsonova

== History ==
Russia competed in its first Fed Cup in 1968, as the Soviet Union. They won the Cup in 2004, 2005, 2007 and 2008, and have finished as runners-up seven times.

Prior to 1992, Russian players represented the Soviet Union. In 1992, eleven countries which had previously been part of the Soviet Union played as the Commonwealth of Independent States, with Evgenia Manyukova and Elena Makarova, who both played in following years for Russia, and Elena Pogorelova, who played one doubles match in the Fed Cup.

=== Russia in the Fed Cup since 1995 ===
==== 2004–2008: Zenith ====
In 2008, the player staff was revised to include debut Maria Sharapova. Dinara Safina replaced Svetlana Kuznetsova, who asked Tarpishchev not to include her as she wanted to fight for the top ranking with Amélie Mauresmo. Anna Chakvetadze, Elena Vesnina and alternate Elena Likhovtseva were also announced for the first round against Israel. As a result of the 4–1 win, the distance between the top-ranked Russian team and the second-placed team Italy increased to 12,847 points.

In the semifinals against the United States, Sharapova was replaced by Kuznetsova. Captain Tarpishchev explained, that they came to an agreement to switch the two players, so that both can concentrate on their tennis schedule. Likhovtseva was removed from the alternate position. Vera Zvonareva now took participation for the next match in the Luzhniki Stadium. Team Russia defeated the Americans without the Williams sisters, Lindsay Davenport and Ashley Harkleroad, 3–2.

The final took place in Madrid against Spain. Safina and Elena Dementieva decided not to participate this time. Ekaterina Makarova made her debut in the doubles dead rubber match with Vesnina. Russia defeated the Spaniards, 4–0. Carla Suárez-Navarro after her loss in the second rubber called Russia the Queen of Tennis.

==== 2009–2013: Out of top ranking ====
The 2009 Fed Cup season started against Team China. Alisa Kleybanova, who previously defeated the 5th-seeded Ana Ivanovic in the third round of the Australian Open, debuted in this season. Zvonareva decided to skip this match for Pattaya, where she would win the tournament. Dementieva headed the Russian team, the other players being Kuznetsova, Chakvetadze and Kleybanova. Russia crushed the Chinese, 5–0. The last rubber was the only one to be played in three sets.

In the semifinals, Russia met Italy. The team was announced on 15 April; it consisted of Zvonareva, Kuznetsova, Petrova and Chakvetadze. Zvonareva could not participate due to ankle injury. Debutants Pavlyuchenkova and Kleybanova were nominated as alternates for Zvonareva, as at most four players could be called. One hour before the draw, the alternate was still not determined, but Kleybanova has been eventually removed. Russia lost four out of five rubbers, with Kuznetsova winning the only rubber. Sports commentator Anna Dmitrieva said, that nominating Chakvetadze was an error. Notwithstanding the loss, Russia stayed in the top rankings for now, but after the Italians defeat of the Americans in the final, they replaced Russia from the throne.

Team Russia in the upcoming match of the new season against Serbia was not made up of the leading tennis players Safina, Kuznetsova, Dementieva and Zvonareva, with the last two having injuries. Tarpishchev announced the new team consisting of Kleybanova, Pavlyuchenkova, Dushevina and Makarova. A few days before the start, Kuznetsova jumped in. Team Russia consisting only of Kleybanova and Kuznetsova defeated Serbia in Belgrade, after coming back from 1–2.

In April, Russia was to play against the United States. The fact that the match would be played in the United States introduced visa problems for the captain. Pavluychenkova, Zvonareva and Kleybanova could not participate due to injuries. Dementieva and Makarova were ready to play for the team. Due to volcanic dust, the draw was expected to be moved two days later, but the situation has been stabilized. In the deciding doubles rubber, Russia lost to the Americans, 2–3.

==== 2014–2015: New coaching staff ====
The 2014 season saw a change in the team leadership. Tarpishchev as an IOC member assisted in the upcoming 2014 Winter Olympic Games in Sochi, and so could not continue heading the Russian team. Anastasia Myskina was elected new captain of the Fed Cup team, after alternate Larisa Savchenko's Latvian citizenship became an obstacle.

The new squad against Australia was announced on 30 January 2014. Those were Victoria Kan, Irina Khromacheva, Valeria Solovyeva and Veronika Kudermetova. Russia lost in the quarterfinal, 4–0.

Sochi became the hosting city of the play-off game against Argentina. Most of the players of the previous team were replaced by Vesnina and Makarova, only Solovyeva was kept for the doubles rubber. Injured Sharapova and Zvonareva could not compete for Russia. The Russians won 4–0, ensuring them a place in the World Group.

Defeating Argentina in the play-offs, Russia returned to the World Group in 2015. Team Russia, consisting of Kuznetsova, Sharapova and the doubles team Vitalia Diatchenko and Anastasia Pavlyuchenkova, faced the winner of the Fed Cup World Group Play-off Poland in the first round, and won 4–0. After losing three matches in a row, Poland decided to cancel the singles match, and played the dead rubber between Fed Cup debut Diatchenko and Pavlyuchenkova and doubles specialists Klaudia Jans-Ignacik and Alicja Rosolska.

Russia's next opponent was Germany, who superseded team Russia in the world ranking after its first round win over Australia. Now Russia competed with Kuznetsova, Pavlyuchenkova and the duo Zvonareva / Vesnina, after Sharapova and Makarova decided not to participate in the semifinals. Sharapova cited her foot injury, and Makarova was too exhausted and unready, according to Makarova's coach Manyukova. Kuznetsova and Pavlyuchenkova won the first two rubbers, but then Germany levelled after winning the other two matches in straight sets. In the deciding doubles match, where Pavlyuchenkova partnered with Vesnina, team Russia overcame the Germans and moved to the finals, which took place in the Czech Republic. There Sharapova won two matches against Kvitová and Plíšková, as against Pavlyuchenkova who lost both of her matches. The deciding doubles match Pavlyuchenkova/Vesnina against Strýcová/Plíšková ended in a three set loss. This is the third time the Russians lost to the Czechs in a Fed Cup final.

==== 2016–19: Out of World Group ====
In the 2016 season, the Russians consisting of Kuznetsova, Makarova and newcomer Daria Kasatkina lost to the Dutch team, 3–1. Sharapova while being member of the team decided not to play for it. The second rubber game, Kuznetsova against Hogenkamp, became the longest singles match in the history of the Fed Cup, lasting 4 hours and resulting 6–7^{(4–7)}, 7–5, 8–10.

Captain Myskina after the loss put the youngsters Kasatkina, Gasparyan and Kulichkova forward against Belarus team. Kasatkina won the first rubber against Aliaksandra Sasnovich, but the following three rubbers were lost. Vesnina and Kasatkina, who replaced Kulichkova, won the dead rubber. For the first time since 1999, Russia left the World Group.

In the 2017 season, Russia was drawn against Chinese Taipei for the first time in the post-Soviet era (USSR team played against Chinese Taipei in 1985, 3:0). Captain Myskina called Ekaterina Makarova and three Fed Cub debuts Natalia Vikhlyantseva, Anna Blinkova and Anna Kalinskaya. Russia won 4–1. Russia, led by Vesnina, Pavlyuchenkova, Kasatkina and Blinkova, were strong favorites playing at home in Moscow against Belgium in the play-offs as Belgium was without their leading ladies Yanina Wickmayer and Kirsten Flipkens. They however lost 2–3 mainly due to a strong performance from Elise Mertens, the highest ranked Belgian at place 66.

The 2018 marked a new low for Russia with their demotion to the Zonal Groups for the first time in two decades, after consecutive losses to Slovakia and Latvia.

Russia got out of the Europe\Africa Zone in 2019 season losing only one match following a Pool draw against Poland and Denmark, followed by a play-off with Sweden. Afterwards there came the Group II play-offs, where a victory against Italy returned Russia to the World Group Qualifiers.

==== 2020–21: fifth title under RTF flag ====
In the rechristened Billie Jean King Cup, Russia entered the qualifying round visiting Romania in Cluj, where Veronika Kudermetova lost her singles matches, but Blinkova, Kalinskaya and Ekaterina Alexandrova helped Russia return to the Finals for the first time since 2016. The COVID-19 pandemic postponed the tournament conclusion to 2021, where the Russian athletes wound up having to compete under the Russian Tennis Federation name and flag due to a December 2020 decision by the Court of Arbitration for Sport (CAS) not allowing the use of the Russian name, flag, or anthem.

In a group stage against Canada and France, the Russians won all but one of their matches. A semifinal against the United States had newcomer Liudmila Samsonova beating Sloane Stephens and Pavlyuchenkova losing to Danielle Collins, and then Kudermetova and Samsonovoa won the tiebreaker to return the Russians to the decisive game after 6 years. Against Switzerland, Kasatkina defeated Jil Teichmann, and Samsonova came back from losing the first round to Belinda Bencic to get the Russians their fifth title, the first since 1999.

==== Since 2022: Suspension ====
After the Russian invasion of Ukraine, the International Tennis Federation suspended Russia and Belarus from Billie Jean King Cup competitions.

== Results ==
Tournament	1968	1969	1970	1971	1972	1973	1974	1975	1976	1977	1978	1979	1980	1981	1982	1983	1984	1985	1986	1987	1988	1989	1990	1991	1992	1993	1994	W–L
Federation Cup
World Group	QF	A	A	A	A	A	A	A	1R	A	SF	SF	QF	QF	QF	1R	2R	1R	1R	2R	F	QF	F	2R	2R	A	A	28–16
Europe/Africa Zone	NH																								A	PO	SF	4–4
Consolation rounds	NH	A	A	A	A	A	NH	A	1R	A	NH	A	A	A	A	W	A	W	F	A	A	A	A	A	A	A	NH	12–1
Win–loss	2–1	—	—	—	—	—	—	—	0–0*	—	3–1	3–1	2–1	2–1	2–1	4–1	1–1	5–1	3–2	1–1	4–1	2–1	4–1	1–1	1–1	3–2	1–2	44–21

Tournament	1995	1996	1997	1998	1999	2000	2001	2002	2003	2004	2005	2006	2007	2008	2009	2010	2011	2012	2013	2014	2015	2016	2017	2018	2019	2020–21	W–L
Fed Cup
World Group/Finals	A	A	A	A	F	8th	F	1R	SF	W	W	1R	W	W	SF	SF	F	SF	F	1R	F	1R	A	A	A	W	40–17
World Group play-offs/Qualifying Round	A	A	A	W	A	NH	W	W	A	A	A	W	A	A	A	A	A	A	A	W	A	L	L	A	A	W	6–2
World Group II	A	A	A	W	A	Not Held					A	A	A	A	A	A	A	A	A	A	A	A	W	L	A	A	2–1
World Group II play-offs	A	A	W	A	A	Not Held					A	A	A	A	A	A	A	A	A	A	A	A	A	L	W	A	2–1
Europe/Africa Group I	SF	F	W	A	A	A	A	A	A	A	A	A	A	A	A	A	A	A	A	A	A	A	A	A	W	A	12–4
Win–loss	2–2	3–2	5–0	2–0	2–1	1–2	4–1	1–1	2–1	4–0	4–0	1–1	3–0	3–0	1–1	1–1	2–1	1–1	2–1	1–1	2–1	0–2	1–1	0–2	4–0	13–4	65–27
Year End Ranking								5	6	2	1	1	1	1	2	3	3	3	3	3	2	4	8	11			

* Soviet Union team failed to show up.

=== Records ===
==== Longest winning streak ====
Year	Competition	Date	Location	Opponent	Score	Result
1997	Europe/Africa Zone, Group I	22 April	Bari (ITA)	Greece	3–0	Won
1997	Europe/Africa Zone, Group I	23 April	Bari (ITA)	Bulgaria	2–1	Won
1997	Europe/Africa Zone, Semifinals	25 April	Bari (ITA)	Israel	2–1	Won
1997	Europe/Africa Zone, Final	26 April	Bari (ITA)	Belarus	3–0	Won
1997	World Group II Play-off	12–13 July	Seoul (KOR)	South Korea	4–1	Won
1998	World Group II	18–19 April	Perth (AUS)	Australia	3–2	Won
1998	World Group Play-off	25–26 July	Moscow (RUS)	Germany	4–1	Won
1999	World Group, First Round	17–18 April	Moscow (RUS)	France	3–2	Won
1999	World Group, Semifinals	24–25 July	Moscow (RUS)	Slovakia	3–2	Won
1999	World Group, Final	18–19 September	Stanford (United States)	United States	1–4	Lost

=== Finals: 12 (5 titles, 7 runners-up) ===
Outcome	Year	Venue	Surface	Team	Opponents	Opposing Team	Score
Runner-up	1988	Flinders Park, Melbourne, Australia	?	Larisa Savchenko; Natalia Zvereva	Czechoslovakia	Jana Novotná; Jana Pospíšilová; Radka Zrubáková; Helena Suková	1–2
Runner-up	1990	Peachtree W.O.T., Atlanta, United States	Hard	Elena Brioukhovets; Natasha Zvereva; Larisa Savchenko; Leila Meskhi	United States	Jennifer Capriati; Zina Garrison; Gigi Fernández; Patty Fendick	1–2
Runner-up	1999	Taube Tennis Stadium, Stanford, United States	Hard	Elena Makarova; Elena Likhovtseva; Elena Dementieva	United States	Lindsay Davenport; Venus Williams; Serena Williams; Monica Seles	1–4
Runner-up	2001	Parque Ferial Juan Carlos 1, Madrid, Spain	Clay (i)	Elena Likhovtseva; Elena Bovina; Elena Dementieva; Nadia Petrova	Belgium	Laurence Courtois; Els Callens; Justine Henin; Kim Clijsters	1–2
Winner	2004	Ice Stadium Krylatskoe, Moscow, Russia	Carpet (i)	Anastasia Myskina; Vera Zvonareva; Svetlana Kuznetsova; Elena Likhovtseva	France	Nathalie Dechy; Tatiana Golovin; Émilie Loit; Marion Bartoli	3–2
Winner	2005	Court Philippe Chatrier, Paris, France	Clay	Elena Dementieva; Anastasia Myskina; Dinara Safina; Vera Dushevina	France	Amélie Mauresmo; Mary Pierce; Nathalie Dechy; Tatiana Golovin	3–2
Winner	2007	Luzhniki Palace of Sports, Moscow, Russia	Hard (i)	Svetlana Kuznetsova; Anna Chakvetadze; Nadia Petrova; Elena Vesnina	Italy	Francesca Schiavone; Mara Santangelo; Roberta Vinci; Flavia Pennetta	4–0
Winner	2008	Club de Campo Villa de Madrid, Madrid, Spain	Clay	Svetlana Kuznetsova; Vera Zvonareva; Elena Vesnina; Ekaterina Makarova	Spain	Anabel Medina Garrigues; Carla Suárez Navarro; Nuria Llagostera Vives; Virginia Ruano Pascual	4–0
Runner-up	2011	Olympic Stadium, Moscow, Russia	Hard (i)	Anastasia Pavlyuchenkova; Svetlana Kuznetsova; Maria Kirilenko; Elena Vesnina	Czech Republic	Petra Kvitová; Lucie Šafářová; Lucie Hradecká; Květa Peschke	2–3
Runner-up	2013	Tennis Club Cagliari, Cagliari, Italy	Red clay	Alexandra Panova; Alisa Kleybanova; Irina Khromacheva; Margarita Gasparyan	Italy	Sara Errani; Roberta Vinci; Flavia Pennetta; Karin Knapp	0–4
Runner-up	2015	O2 Arena, Prague, Czech Republic	Hard (i)	Maria Sharapova; Anastasia Pavlyuchenkova; Elena Vesnina	Czech Republic	Petra Kvitová; Karolína Plíšková; Barbora Strýcová	2–3
Winner	2020–21	O2 Arena, Prague, Czech Republic	Hard (i)	Anastasia Pavlyuchenkova; Daria Kasatkina; Veronika Kudermetova; Ekaterina Alexandrova; Liudmila Samsonova	Switzerland	Jil Teichmann; Belinda Bencic; Viktorija Golubic; Stefanie Vögele	2–0

== Awards ==
- The Russian Cup in the nomination Team of the Year (2004, 2005, 2007, 2008, 2015)

== See also ==
- Billie Jean King Cup
- Russia Davis Cup team
- Russia at the Hopman Cup
