= Denisa Krajčovičová =

Slovak tennis player (born 1968)

- Country (sports): Czechoslovakia; Slovakia
- Born: 18 November 1968 (age 57) Bratislava, Czechoslovakia
- Prize money: $215,862

Singles
- Career titles: 1 ITF
- Highest ranking: No. 117 (16 September 1991)

Grand Slam singles results
- Australian Open: 1R (1991, 1992)
- French Open: 1R (1989, 1992)

Doubles
- Career titles: 9 ITF
- Highest ranking: No. 88 (18 March 1996)

Grand Slam doubles results
- Australian Open: 2R (1996)
- French Open: 2R (1994)
- Wimbledon: 1R (1996)
- US Open: 1R (1994, 1996)

Denisa Krajčovičová (born 18 November 1968) is a former professional tennis player from Slovakia. From 1991 to 1996, she was known under her married name Denisa Szabová.

== Biography ==
Krajčovičová began playing professionally in the late 1980s, originally under the flag of Czechoslovakia.

She made the semifinals of the 1991 San Marino WTA Tour tournament.

In 1993, she began competing as a Slovakian and represented the Slovakia Fed Cup team in their 1995 World Group playoff tie against Paraguay.

She made another WTA Tour semifinal at Zagreb in 1995.

Towards the end of her career, she peaked as a doubles player, making a WTA Tour final at the 1995 Warsaw Cup and the following year winning a $75k Bratislava ITF Circuit tournament.

== WTA career finals ==
=== Doubles: 1 (runner-up) ===
Result	Date	Tournament	Tier	Surface	Partner	Opponents	Score
Loss	Sep 1995	Warsaw Open, Poland	Tier III	Clay	(Slovakia) Henrieta Nagyová	(Italy) Sandra Cecchini (Italy) Laura Garrone	7–5, 2–6, 3–6

== ITF finals ==
$75,000 tournaments
$50,000 tournaments
$25,000 tournaments
$10,000 tournaments

=== Singles: 5 (1–4) ===
Result	No.	Date	Tournament	Surface	Opponent	Score
Loss	1.	22 September 1986	ITF Bol, Yugoslavia	Clay	(Italy) Silvia La Fratta	1–6, 3–6
Win	2.	20 July 1987	ITF Stuttgart, West Germany	Clay	(West Germany) Michaela Kriebel	6–4, 4–6, 7–5
Loss	3.	16 November 1987	ITF Wels, Austria	Hard (i)	(Austria) Barbara Paulus	2–6, 2–6
Loss	4.	8 July 1990	ITF Stuttgart, West Germany	Clay	(Bulgaria) Elena Pampoulova	3–6, 3–6
Loss	5.	8 July 1991	ITF Erlangen, Germany	Clay	(Germany) Maja Živec-Škulj	5–7, 6–1, 1–6

=== Doubles: 25 (9–16) ===
Result	No.	Date	Tournament	Surface	Partner	Opponents	Score
Loss	1.	9 June 1986	ITF Lyon, France	Clay	(Hungary) Réka Szikszay	(Netherlands) Nicole Muns-Jagerman (Netherlands) Simone Schilder	5–7, 4–6
Win	2.	28 July 1986	ITF Neumünster, West Germany	Clay	(Czechoslovakia) Alice Noháčová	(Switzerland) Céline Cohen (Argentina) Susana Maria Villaverde	7–6, 6–3
Loss	3.	22 September 1986	ITF Bol, Yugoslavia	Clay	(Czechoslovakia) Alice Noháčová	(Italy) Silvia La Fratta (Italy) Barbara Romanò	5–7, 3–6
Loss	4.	29 September 1986	ITF Sibenik, Yugoslavia	Clay	(Czechoslovakia) Radka Zrubáková	(Czechoslovakia) Petra Langrová (Czechoslovakia) Jana Pospíšilová	1–6, 2–6
Loss	5.	6 October 1986	ITF Mali Lošinj, Yugoslavia	Clay	(Czechoslovakia) Radka Zrubáková	(Czechoslovakia) Petra Langrová (Czechoslovakia) Jana Pospíšilová	3–6, 6–7
Win	6.	13 October 1986	ITF Rabac, Yugoslavia	Clay	(Czechoslovakia) Radka Zrubáková	(Czechoslovakia) Petra Langrová (Czechoslovakia) Jana Pospíšilová	6–3, 6–2
Loss	7.	1 December 1986	ITF Budapest, Hungary	Clay (i)	(Czechoslovakia) Radka Zrubáková	(Czechoslovakia) Jana Novotná (Czechoslovakia) Regina Rajchrtová	1–6, 7–6, 3–6
Loss	8.	12 January 1987	ITF Helsinki, Finland	Carpet (i)	(Czechoslovakia) Radka Zrubáková	(Sweden) Cecilia Dahlman (Finland) Laura Maennistoe	7–6, 6–7, 6–7
Loss	9.	26 January 1987	ITF Stavanger, Norway	Carpet (i)	(Czechoslovakia) Radka Zrubáková	(Sweden) Catrin Jexell (Sweden) Lena Sandin	6–3, 1–6, 1–6
Win	10.	13 July 1987	ITF Erlangen, West Germany	Clay	(France) Virginie Paquet	(Australia) Alison Scott (Austria) Heidi Sprung	6–1, 6–2
Loss	11.	20 July 1987	ITF Stuttgart, West Germany	Clay	(Czechoslovakia) Hana Fukárková	(France) Julie Halard-Decugis (France) Virginie Paquet	4–6, 3–6
Win	12.	27 July 1987	ITF Neumünster, West Germany	Clay	(Czechoslovakia) Radka Zrubáková	(Czechoslovakia) Nora Bajčíková (Czechoslovakia) Iva Budařová	6–0, 6–2
Loss	13.	3 August 1987	ITF Rheda-Wiedenbrück, West Germany	Clay	(Czechoslovakia) Nora Bajčíková	(Czechoslovakia) Hana Fukárková (Czechoslovakia) Jana Pospíšilová	2–6, 0–6
Loss	14.	20 August 1987	ITF Darmstadt, West Germany	Clay	(Czechoslovakia) Nora Bajčíková	(Czechoslovakia) Hana Fukárková (Czechoslovakia) Jana Pospíšilová	0–6, 3–6
Loss	15.	12 October 1987	ITF Mali Lošinj, Yugoslavia	Clay	(Czechoslovakia) Jana Pospíšilová	(Czechoslovakia) Michaela Frimmelová (Czechoslovakia) Petra Holubová	5–7, 6–4, 5–7
Win	16.	14 August 1989	ITF Budapest, Hungary	Clay	(Czechoslovakia) Hana Fukárková	(Finland) Nanne Dahlman (West Germany) Silke Frankl	4–6, 6–3, 6–3
Loss	17.	26 February 1990	ITF Wels, Austria	Clay (i)	(Czechoslovakia) Hana Fukárková	(France) Alexia Dechaume-Balleret (France) Pascale Paradis	3–6, 2–6
Loss	18.	6 August 1990	ITF Budapest, Hungary	Clay	(Czechoslovakia) Alice Noháčová	(France) Sylvie Sabas (France) Sandrine Testud	3–6, 4–6
Loss	19.	3 June 1991	ITF Mondorf, Luxembourg	Clay	(Germany) Henrike Kadzidroga	(Czechoslovakia) Radka Bobková (Spain) Ana Segura	1–6, 4–6
Win	20.	17 June 1991	ITF Modena, Italy	Clay	(Czechoslovakia) Jana Pospíšilová	(Netherlands) Yvonne Grubben (Netherlands) Stephanie Rottier	6–1, 6–4
Win	21.	31 August 1992	ITF Klagenfurt, Austria	Clay	(Czechoslovakia) Jana Pospíšilová	(Germany) Katja Oeljeklaus (Germany) Heike Thoms	w/o
Loss	22.	28 June 1993	ITF Stuttgart, Germany	Clay	(Slovakia) Katarína Studeníková	(Czech Republic) Eva Martincová (Czech Republic) Sylvia Štefková	1–6 ret.
Loss	23.	8 August 1993	ITF Sopot, Poland	Clay	(Slovakia) Katarína Studeníková	(Slovenia) Tina Križan (Czech Republic) Květa Peschke	3–6, 1–6
Win	24.	2 September 1996	ITF Bratislava, Slovakia	Clay	(Hungary) Andrea Temesvári	(Czech Republic) Petra Langrová (Slovakia) Radka Zrubáková	0–6, 6–3, 6–3
Win	25.	2 February 1997	ITF Prostejov, Czech Republic	Carpet (i)	(Hungary) Andrea Temesvári	(Poland) Aleksandra Olsza (Ukraine) Elena Tatarkova	6–2, 6–3
