= Henrieta Nagyová =

Slovak tennis player

- Country (sports): Slovakia
- Residence: Nové Zámky, Slovakia
- Born: 15 December 1978 (age 47) Nové Zámky, Czechoslovakia
- Height: 1.77 m (5 ft 9 1/2 in)
- Turned pro: 1 January 1994
- Retired: 2006
- Plays: Right-handed (two-handed backhand)
- Prize money: $1,742,470

Singles
- Career record: 366–234
- Career titles: 9 WTA, 9 ITF
- Highest ranking: No. 21 (17 September 2001)

Grand Slam singles results
- Australian Open: 4R (1998)
- French Open: 4R (1998, 2001)
- Wimbledon: 2R (1998, 2004)
- US Open: 3R (1998, 1999, 2001)

Other tournaments
- Olympic Games: 1R (2000)

Doubles
- Career record: 158–138
- Career titles: 4 WTA, 5 ITF
- Highest ranking: No. 37 (13 May 2002)

Grand Slam doubles results
- Australian Open: 2R (1997, 1998, 2001, 2003)
- French Open: QF (2003)
- Wimbledon: QF (2001)
- US Open: QF (2002)

Mixed doubles
- Career record: 3–4
- Career titles: 0

Grand Slam mixed doubles results
- Australian Open: 2R (2002)
- Wimbledon: 3R (2001)

Team competitions
- Fed Cup: W (2002), record 18–6

Henrieta Nagyová (born 15 December 1978) is a former tennis player from Slovakia. She been ranked as high as world No. 21, achieved on 17 September 2001. She won nine singles and four doubles titles on the WTA Tour. Nagyová was a member of the Slovak team that won the 2002 Fed Cup.

== WTA Tour finals ==
=== Singles: 14 (9 titles, 5 runner-ups) ===
Legend
Grand Slam (–)
Tier I (–)
Tier II (–)
Tier III (2–3), IV (7–2), V (–)

Result	W–L	Date	Tournament	Tier	Surface	Opponent	Score
Win	1–0	Sep 1996	Warsaw, Poland	Tier III	Clay	(Austria) Barbara Paulus	3–6, 6–2, 6–1
Loss	1–1	Jul 1997	Warsaw, Poland	Tier III	Clay	(Austria) Barbara Paulus	4–6, 4–6
Loss	1–2	Jul 1997	Austrian Open	Tier IV	Clay	(Austria) Barbara Schett	6–3, 2–6, 3–6
Win	2–2	Nov 1997	Pattaya, Thailand	Tier IV	Hard	(Belgium) Dominique Van Roost	7–5, 6–7^{(6–8)}, 7–5
Win	3–2	Aug 1998	Sopot, Poland	Tier IV	Clay	(Germany) Elena Wagner	6–3, 5–7, 6–1
Win	4–2	Aug 1998	Istanbul, Turkey	Tier IV	Hard	(Belarus) Olga Barabanschikova	6–4, 3–6, 7–6^{(11–9)}
Win	5–2	Feb 1999	Prostějov, Czech Republic	Tier IV	Carpet (i)	(Italy) Silvia Farina Elia	7–6^{(7–2)}, 6–4
Win	6–2	May 2000	Warsaw, Poland	Tier IV	Clay	(Netherlands) Amanda Hopmans	2–6, 6–4, 7–5
Win	7–2	Jul 2000	Palermo, Italy	Tier IV	Clay	(New Zealand) Pavlina Nola	6–3, 7–5
Win	8–2	Nov 2000	Kuala Lumpur, Malaysia	Tier III	Hard	(Croatia) Iva Majoli	6–4, 6–2
Loss	8–3	Nov 2001	Pattaya, Thailand	Tier IV	Hard	(Switzerland) Patty Schnyder	0–6, 4–6
Loss	8–4	May 2002	Warsaw, Poland	Tier III	Clay	(Russia) Elena Bovina	3–6, 1–6
Loss	8–5	Jul 2002	Warsaw, Poland	Tier III	Clay	(Russia) Dinara Safina	3–6, 0–4 ret.
Win	9–5	Nov 2003	Pattaya, Thailand	Tier IV	Hard	(Slovakia) Ľubomíra Kurhajcová	6–4, 6–2

=== Doubles: 10 (4 titles, 6 runner-ups) ===
Legend
Grand Slam tournaments
Tier I (0)
Tier II (0)
Tier III (2)
Tier IV & V (2)

Result	W–L	Date	Tournament	Surface	Partner	Opponents	Score
Loss	0–1	Sep 1995	Warsaw Open, Poland	Clay	(Slovakia) Denisa Szabová	(Italy) Sandra Cecchini (Italy) Laura Garrone	7–5, 2–6, 3–6
Win	1–1	Apr 1997	Bol Open, Croatia	Clay	(Slovakia) Laura Montalvo	(Argentina) María José Gaidano (Austria) Marion Maruska	6–3, 6–1
Win	2–1	Nov 2000	Commonwealth Classic, Malaysia	Hard	(Austria) Sylvia Plischke	(South Africa) Liezel Huber (Canada) Vanessa Webb	6–4, 7–6
Loss	2–2	Jan 2002	Auckland Open, New Zealand	Hard	(Czech Republic) Květa Peschke	(United States) Nicole Arendt (South Africa) Liezel Huber	5–7, 4–6
Loss	2–3	May 2002	Bol Open, Croatia	Clay	(Russia) Elena Bovina	(Italy) Tathiana Garbin (Indonesia) Angelique Widjaja	5–7, 6–3, 4–6
Win	3–3	May 2002	J&S Cup Warsaw, Poland	Clay	(Croatia) Jelena Kostanić Tošić	(Russia) Evgenia Kulikovskaya (Croatia) Silvija Talaja	6–1, 6–1
Win	4–3	Oct 2002	Bratislava Open, Slovakia	Hard (i)	(Slovenia) Maja Matevžič	(United States) Meilen Tu (France) Nathalie Dechy	6–4, 6–0
Loss	4–4	Apr 2003	Morocco Open	Clay	(Ukraine) Elena Tatarkova	(Argentina) Gisela Dulko (Argentina) Maria-Emilia Salerni	3–6, 4–6
Loss	4–5	Jul 2004	Palermo Ladies Open, Italy	Clay	(Slovakia) Ľubomíra Kurhajcová	(Spain) Anabel Medina Garrigues (Spain) Arantxa Sánchez Vicario	3–6, 6–7^{(4–7)}
Loss	4–6	Apr 2005	Estoril Open, Portugal	Clay	(Netherlands) Michaëlla Krajicek	(China) Li Ting (China) Sun Tiantian	3–6, 1–6

== ITF finals ==
=== Singles: 12 (9–3) ===
$100,000 tournaments
$75,000 tournaments
$50,000 tournaments
$25,000 tournaments
$10,000 tournaments

Result	No.	Date	Tournament	Surface	Opponent	Score
Win	1.	17 July 1994	ITF Olsztyn, Poland	Clay	(Poland) Magdalena Grzybowska	6–4, 2–6, 6–4
Win	2.	25 September 1994	ITF Poreč, Croatia	Clay	(Czech Republic) Sylva Nesvadbová	6–1, 1–6, 6–1
Loss	3.	12 December 1994	ITF Přerov, Czech Republic	Hard (i)	(Slovakia) Karina Habšudová	1–6, 4–6
Win	4.	21 May 1995	ITF Bordeaux, France	Clay	(United States) Erika deLone	6–1, 6–3
Win	5.	28 August 1995	ITF Athens, Greece	Clay	(Switzerland) Patty Schnyder	6–2, 6–0
Win	6.	18 February 1996	ITF Cali, Colombia	Clay	(Greece) Christína Papadáki	6–2, 7–6
Win	7.	2 September 1996	ITF Bratislava, Slovakia	Clay	(Switzerland) Patty Schnyder	6–0, 6–4
Win	8.	11 August 1997	ITF Bratislava, Slovakia	Clay	(Spain) Gala León García	6–4, 6–0
Loss	9.	9 April 2000	ITF West Palm Beach, United States	Clay	(United States) Meghann Shaughnessy	6–4, 5–7, 6–7^{(4)}
Win	10.	8 April 2001	ITF Boynton Beach, United States	Clay	(Sweden) Åsa Carlsson	3–6, 6–3, 6–1
Win	11.	28 September 2003	ITF Biella, Italy	Clay	(Hungary) Zsófia Gubacsi	6–3, 6–1
Loss	12.	19 October 2003	Dubai Challenge, United Arab Emirates	Hard	(Serbia and Montenegro) Jelena Janković	2–6, 5–7

=== Doubles: 7 (5–2) ===
Legend
$100,000 tournaments
$75,000 tournaments
$50,000 tournaments
$25,000 tournaments
$10,000 tournaments

Result	No.	Date	Tournament	Surface	Partner	Opponents	Score
Win	1.	19 June 1994	ITF Maribor, Slovenia	Clay	(Czech Republic) Veronika Šafářová	(Poland) Sylwia Rynarzewska (Poland) Monika Starosta	7–5, 6–0
Loss	1.	17 July 1994	ITF Olsztyn, Poland	Clay	(United States) Corina Morariu	(Netherlands) Mariëlle Bruens (Netherlands) Amanda Hopmans	4–6, 7–5, 5–7
Loss	2.	12 December 1994	ITF Přerov, Czech Republic	Hard (i)	(Russia) Anna Linkova	(Czech Republic) Olga Hostáková (Czech Republic) Eva Krejčová	4–6, 4–6
Win	2.	9 July 1995	ITF Stuttgart, Germany	Clay	(Slovakia) Radka Zrubáková	(Federal Republic of Yugoslavia) Tatjana Ječmenica (Ukraine) Elena Tatarkova	6–3, 7–6
Win	3.	28 August 1995	ITF Athens, Greece	Clay	(Poland) Magdalena Grzybowska	(United States) Corina Morariu (Greece) Christina Zachariadou	w/o
Win	4.	17 August 1997	ITF Bratislava, Slovakia	Clay	(Belgium) Laurence Courtois	(Bulgaria) Pavlina Nola (Bulgaria) Svetlana Krivencheva	6–1, 6–0
Winner	5.	9 April 2006	ITF Dinan, France	Clay (i)	(Poland) Klaudia Jans-Ignacik	(Romania) Mădălina Gojnea (Poland) Agnieszka Radwańska	3–6, 6–2, 6–4
