= 1994 Federation Cup (tennis) =

International women's tennis competition

Details
- Duration: 11 April – 24 July
- Edition: 32nd

Champion
- Winning nation: Spain

The 1994 Federation Cup was the 32nd edition of the most important competition between national teams in women's tennis. Spain defeated the United States in the final, giving Spain their 3rd and 2nd consecutive title.

This was the last competition to bear the name "Federation Cup", and the last in which the final group of teams assembled to compete at a single site. The following year, the International Tennis Federation rechristened the competition the Fed Cup, and adopted a Davis Cup-style format in which all ties were held in one of the competing countries.

== Qualifying rounds ==
- Nations in **bold** qualified for the World Group.

=== Americas Zone ===
Venue: Cochabamba Tennis Centre, Cochabamba, Bolivia (outdoor clay)

Dates: April 11–17

Participating teams

- Bahamas
- Bolivia
- **Chile**
- Costa Rica
- **Cuba**
- Dominican Republic
- Ecuador
- El Salvador
- Guatemala
- Jamaica
- Mexico
- **Paraguay**
- Peru
- Puerto Rico
- Trinidad and Tobago
- Uruguay
- Venezuela

=== Asia/Oceania Zone ===
Venue: Delhi LTA Complex, New Delhi, India (outdoor clay)

Dates: May 2–6

Participating teams

- **Chinese Taipei**
- India
- New Zealand
- Philippines
- Singapore
- Sri Lanka
- Syria
- Thailand

=== Europe/Africa Zone ===
Venue: Freizeit Park, Bad Waltersdorf, Austria (outdoor clay)

Dates: April 18–23

Participating teams

- **Austria**
- **Belarus**
- **Belgium**
- Egypt
- Estonia
- Georgia
- Great Britain
- Greece
- Hungary
- Ireland
- Israel
- Lithuania
- Luxembourg
- Malta
- Norway
- Portugal
- Romania
- Russia
- **Slovakia**
- Slovenia
- Tunisia
- Turkey
- Ukraine
- Zimbabwe

== World Group ==
Venue: Waldstadion T.C., Frankfurt, Germany (outdoor clay)

Dates: July 18–24

Participating teams
Argentina	Australia	Austria	Belarus	Belgium	Bulgaria	Canada	Chile
China	Chinese Taipei	Colombia	Croatia	Cuba	Czech Republic	Denmark	Finland
France	Germany	Indonesia	Italy	Japan	Latvia	Netherlands	Paraguay
Poland	Slovakia	South Africa	South Korea	Spain	Sweden	Switzerland	United States

=== Draw ===
First Round; 18–19 July
Spain	3
Q	Chile	0
Q	Cuba	0
Argentina	3
Q	Belgium	1
Sweden	2
China	1
Japan	2
Finland	1
Q	Slovakia	2
Germany	3
Colombia	0
South Africa	3
Q	Paraguay	0
Q	Belarus	1
Netherlands	2
France	3
South Korea	0
Italy	2
Denmark	1
Q	Chinese Taipei	1
Indonesia	2
Croatia	1
Bulgaria	2
United States	3
Czech Republic	0
Canada	3
Switzerland	0
Q	Austria	2
Poland	1
Latvia	1
Australia	2

Second Round; 20–21 July
Spain	3
Argentina	0
Sweden	0
Japan	3
Q	Slovakia	1
Germany	2
South Africa	2
Netherlands	1
France	3
Italy	0
Indonesia	0
Bulgaria	3
United States	3
Canada	0
Q	Austria	2
Australia	1

Quarterfinals; 22 July
Spain	3
Japan	0
Germany	3
South Africa	0
France	2
Bulgaria	1
United States	3
Q	Austria	0

Semifinals; 23 July
Spain	2
Germany	1
France	0
United States	3

Final; 24 July
Spain	3
United States	0
