= Marina Lazarovska =

Macedonian tennis player

Marina Lazarovska Марина Лазаровска
- Country (sports): North Macedonia
- Born: 29 July 1978 (age 46); SFR Yugoslavia
- Retired: 2003
- Prize money: $36,899

Singles
- Career record: 114–129
- Career titles: 3 ITF
- Highest ranking: No. 362 (25 September 2000)

Doubles
- Career record: 99–88
- Career titles: 8 ITF
- Highest ranking: No. 302 (30 August 1999)

Team competitions
- Fed Cup: 14–13

Marina Lazarovska (Macedonian: Марина Лазаровска; born 29 July 1978) is a former Macedonian tennis player.

In her career, she won three titles in singles and eight in doubles on the ITF Women's Circuit. On 25 September 2000, Lazarovska achieved her career-high singles ranking of world No. 362. On 30 August 1999, she reached a doubles ranking of world No. 302.

Representing North Macedonia, Lazarovska has an overall record of 14–13 in Fed Cup competition. She retired from professional tennis 2003.

== ITF Circuit finals ==
=== Singles (3–2) ===
| Result | No. | Date | Location | Surface | Opponent | Score |
|---|---|---|---|---|---|---|
| Win | 1. | 28 April 1997 | Sofia, Bulgaria | Clay | (Romania) Alida Gallovits | 3–6, 7–6^{(5)}, 7–6^{(4)} |
| Loss | 1. | 15 March 1999 | Petroupoli, Greece | Clay | (Hungary) Adrienn Hegedűs | 5–7, 3–6 |
| Win | 2. | 24 May 1999 | Mersin, Turkey | Clay | (Serbia and Montenegro) Silvia Hegedis | 7–5, 0–6, 7–6^{(9–7)} |
| Win | 3. | 27 September 1999 | Skopje, Macedonia | Clay | (Austria) Bianca Kamper | 6–2, 6–2 |
| Loss | 2. | 17 April 2000 | Filothei, Greece | Clay | (Hungary) Adrienn Hegedűs | 6–7^{(2–7)}, 1–6 |

=== Doubles (8–6) ===
| Legend $50,000 tournaments $25,000 tournaments $10,000 tournaments | Finals by surface Hard (1–0) Clay (6–5) Carpet (1–1) |

| Result | No. | Date | Location | Surface | Partner | Opponents | Score |
|---|---|---|---|---|---|---|---|
| Loss | 1. | 22 May 1995 | Salzburg, Austria | Clay | (Slovenia) Tjaša Jezernik | (United States) Corina Morariu (Australia) Aarthi Venkatesan | w/o |
| Loss | 2. | 20 November 1995 | Le Havre, France | Clay (i) | (Federal Republic of Yugoslavia) Dragana Zarić | (Czech Republic) Markéta Štusková (Austria) Patricia Wartusch | 4–6, 5–7 |
| Win | 1. | 4 March 1996 | Buchen, Germany | Carpet (i) | (Federal Republic of Yugoslavia) Dragana Zarić | (Germany) Lisa Fritz (Russia) Katerina Tikhankina | 6–4, 4–6, 6–4 |
| Loss | 3. | 27 May 1996 | Skopje, Macedonia | Clay | (Federal Republic of Yugoslavia) Katarina Mišić | (Bulgaria) Galina Dimitrova (Bulgaria) Antoaneta Pandjerova | 4–6, 0–6 |
| Win | 2. | 28 April 1997 | Sofia, Bulgaria | Clay | (Bulgaria) Teodora Nedeva | (France) Marina Caiazzo (Federal Republic of Yugoslavia) Katarina Mišić | 6–4, 6–2 |
| Loss | 4. | 24 August 1998 | Skiathos, Greece | Carpet | (Belarus) Tatiana Poutchek | (Greece) Eleni Daniilidou (Greece) Evagelia Roussi | 6–3, 4–6, 2–6 |
| Win | 3. | 5 October 1998 | Orestiada, Greece | Hard | (Austria) Julia Adlbrecht | (Bulgaria) Antoaneta Pandjerova (Romania) Mira Lorelei Radu | 6–0, 6–4 |
| Loss | 5. | 24 May 1999 | Mersin, Turkey | Clay | (Germany) Denise Hofer | (Romania) Daniela Cocos (Romania) Adriana Mingireanu | 5–7, 6–7^{(4–7)} |
| Win | 4. | 2 August 1999 | Bucharest, Romania | Clay | (Romania) Mihaela Moldovan | (Romania) Raluca Ciochină (Romania) Adriana Mingireanu | 6–1, 6–2 |
| Win | 5. | 16 August 1999 | Bucharest, Romania | Clay | (Romania) Mihaela Moldovan | (Romania) Ioana Gașpar (Romania) Carmen Raluca Tibuleac | 3–2 ret. |
| Win | 6. | 27 September 1999 | Skopje, Macedonia | Clay | (Federal Republic of Yugoslavia) Ljiljana Nanušević | (Romania) Ramona But (Romania) Ioana Gașpar | 6–4, 5–7, 6–3 |
| Win | 7. | 4 June 2000 | Skopje, Macedonia | Clay | (Federal Republic of Yugoslavia) Katarina Mišić | (Federal Republic of Yugoslavia) Ljiljana Nanušević (Bulgaria) Biljana Pawlowa-Dimitrova | 7–6^{(8–6)}, 6–3 |
| Win | 8. | 12 June 2000 | Ankara, Turkey | Clay | (Bosnia and Herzegovina) Mervana Jugić-Salkić | (Bulgaria) Kalina Diankova (Turkey) İpek Şenoğlu | 6–2, 0–6, 6–4 |
| Loss | 6. | 13 August 2001 | Koksijde, Belgium | Clay | (Croatia) Jelena Pandžić | (Czech Republic) Lenka Snajdrova (Sweden) Aleksandra Srndovic | 2–6, 4–6 |

== Fed Cup participation ==
=== Singles ===
| Edition | Round | Date | Location | Against | Surface | Opponent | W/L | Score |
|---|---|---|---|---|---|---|---|---|
| 1996 Fed Cup | E/A Zone Group II | 26 March 1996 | Ramat HaSharon, Israel | Zimbabwe | Hard | (Zimbabwe) Julia Muir | L | 1–6, 2–6 |
| 1996 Fed Cup | E/A Zone Group II | 27 March 1996 | Ramat HaSharon, Israel | Luxembourg | Hard | (Luxembourg) Anne Kremer | L | 3–6, 6–7^{(2–7)} |
| 1996 Fed Cup | E/A Zone Group II | 28 March 1996 | Ramat HaSharon, Israel | Israel | Hard | (Israel) Anna Smashnova | L | 1–6, 1–6 |
| 1998 Fed Cup | E/A Zone Group II | 6 May 1998 | Manavgat, Turkey | Liechtenstein | Clay | (Liechtenstein) Angelika Schädler | W | 6–0, 6–1 |
| 1998 Fed Cup | E/A Zone Group II | 7 May 1998 | Manavgat, Turkey | Botswana | Clay | (Botswana) Mmaphala Letsatle | W | 6–1, 6–1 |
| 1998 Fed Cup | E/A Zone Group II | 8 May 1998 | Manavgat, Turkey | Egypt | Clay | (Egypt) Marwa El Wany | W | 5–0 ret. |
| 1998 Fed Cup | E/A Zone Group II | 9 May 1998 | Manavgat, Turkey | Finland | Clay | (Finland) Hanna-Katri Aalto | W | 6–3, 7–6^{(7–1)} |
| 1999 Fed Cup | E/A Zone Group II | 26 April 1999 | Murcia, Spain | Turkey | Clay | (Turkey) Gülberk Gültekin | W | 6–2, 6–2 |
| 1999 Fed Cup | E/A Zone Group II | 27 April 1999 | Murcia, Spain | (Republic of Ireland) Ireland | Clay | (Republic of Ireland) Kelly Liggan | L | 4–6, 2–3 ret. |
| 2000 Fed Cup | E/A Zone Group II | 28 March 2000 | Estoril, Portugal | Mauritius | Clay | (Mauritius) Corinne Ng Tung Hing | W | 6–0, 6–1 |
| 2000 Fed Cup | E/A Zone Group II | 29 March 2000 | Estoril, Portugal | Malta | Clay | (Malta) Helen Asciak | W | 7–5, 6–0 |
| 2000 Fed Cup | E/A Zone Group II | 31 March 2000 | Estoril, Portugal | Kenya | Clay | (Kenya) Evelyn Otula | W | 6–0, 6–0 |
| 2000 Fed Cup | E/A Zone Group II | 1 April 2000 | Estoril, Portugal | (Republic of Ireland) Ireland | Clay | (Republic of Ireland) Yvonne Doyle | W | 6–2, 6–4 |
| 2001 Fed Cup | E/A Zone Group I | 24 April 2001 | Murcia, Spain | Netherlands | Clay | (Netherlands) Amanda Hopmans | L | 1–6, 1–6 |
| 2001 Fed Cup | E/A Zone Group I | 25 April 2001 | Murcia, Spain | (Serbia and Montenegro) Yugoslavia | Clay | (Serbia and Montenegro) Sandra Načuk | L | 2–6, 2–6 |
| 2001 Fed Cup | E/A Zone Group I | 26 April 2001 | Murcia, Spain | Poland | Clay | (Poland) Anna Bieleń-Żarska | L | 1–6, 0–6 |

=== Doubles ===
| Edition | Round | Date | Location | Against | Surface | Partner | Opponents | W/L | Score |
|---|---|---|---|---|---|---|---|---|---|
| 1996 Fed Cup | E/A Zone Group II | 26 March 1996 | Ramat HaSharon, Israel | Zimbabwe | Hard | (North Macedonia) Irena Mihailova | (Zimbabwe) Paula Iversen (Zimbabwe) Julia Muir | L | 4–6, 3–6 |
| 1996 Fed Cup | E/A Zone Group II | 28 March 1996 | Ramat HaSharon, Israel | Israel | Hard | (North Macedonia) Irena Mihailova | (Israel) Nataly Cahana (Israel) Tzipora Obziler | L | 3–6, 2–6 |
| 1996 Fed Cup | E/A Zone Group II | 29 March 1996 | Ramat HaSharon, Israel | Estonia | Hard | (North Macedonia) Irena Mihailova | (Estonia) Helene Holter (Estonia) Helen Laupa | W | 6–3, 6–4 |
| 1998 Fed Cup | E/A Zone Group II | 6 May 1998 | Manavgat, Turkey | Liechtenstein | Clay | (North Macedonia) Biljana Trpeska | (Liechtenstein) Jeannine Niedhardt (Liechtenstein) Sidonia Wolfinger | W | 6–4, 6–0 |
| 1998 Fed Cup | E/A Zone Group II | 7 May 1998 | Manavgat, Turkey | Botswana | Clay | (North Macedonia) Elena Manevska | (Botswana) Mmaphala Letsatle (Botswana) Razalia Phethu | W | 6–0, 6–2 |
| 1998 Fed Cup | E/A Zone Group II | 9 May 1998 | Manavgat, Turkey | Finland | Clay | (North Macedonia) Biljana Trpeska | (Finland) Nanne Dahlman (Finland) Linda Jansson | L | 6–1, 5–7, 2–6 |
| 1999 Fed Cup | E/A Zone Group II | 26 April 1999 | Murcia, Spain | Turkey | Clay | (North Macedonia) Elena Manevska | (Turkey) Duygu Akşit Oal (Turkey) Gülberk Gültekin | L | 1–6, 5–7 |
| 2000 Fed Cup | E/A Zone Group II | 31 March 2000 | Estoril, Portugal | Kenya | Clay | (North Macedonia) Biljana Dimovska | (Kenya) Christine Lukalo (Kenya) Florence Mbugua | W | 6–0, 6–2 |
| 2000 Fed Cup | E/A Zone Group II | 1 April 2000 | Estoril, Portugal | (Republic of Ireland) Ireland | Clay | (North Macedonia) Biljana Dimovska | (Republic of Ireland) Yvonne Doyle (Republic of Ireland) Kelly Liggan | W | 6–3, 6–2 |
| 2001 Fed Cup | E/A Zone Group I | 24 April 2001 | Murcia, Spain | Netherlands | Clay | (North Macedonia) Biljana Dimovska | (Netherlands) Kristie Boogert (Netherlands) Miriam Oremans | L | 0–6, 0–6 |
| 2001 Fed Cup | E/A Zone Group I | 25 April 2001 | Murcia, Spain | (Serbia and Montenegro) Yugoslavia | Clay | (North Macedonia) Suzi Becvinovska | (Serbia and Montenegro) Katarina Mišić (Serbia and Montenegro) Dragana Zarić | L | 1–6, 1–6 |
