= 1996 Fed Cup Europe/Africa Zone Group II – Pool C =

International tennis competition

Group C of the 1996 Fed Cup Europe/Africa Zone Group II was one of four pools in the Europe/Africa zone of the 1996 Fed Cup. Four teams competed in a round robin competition, with the top two teams advancing to the play-offs.

	(Israel) ISR	(Luxembourg) LUX	(Estonia) EST	(Zimbabwe) ZIM	(North Macedonia) MKD	Match; W–L	Set; W–L	Game; W–L	Standings
Israel		2–1	3–0	3–0	3–0	4–0	22–2	144–62	1
Luxembourg	1–2		2–1	2–1	2–1	3–1	13–11	105–113	2
Estonia	0–3	1–2		3–0	2–1	2–2	10–14	102–114	3
Zimbabwe	0–3	1–2	0–3		3–0	1–3	11–16	118–128	4
Macedonia	0–3	1–2	1–2	0–3		0–4	5–18	78–130	5

== Israel vs. Estonia ==
Israel
3
Ramat HaSharon, Israel
25 March 1996
Hard (outdoors)

Estonia
0

			1	2	3
1	(Israel) (Estonia)	Hila Rosen; Liina Suurvarik	7; 5	6; 1
2	(Israel) (Estonia)	Nataly Cahana; Helina Lill	6; 1	6; 0
3	(Israel) (Estonia)	Nataly Cahana / Tzipora Obziler; Helene Holter / Helen Laupa	6; 4	6; 4

== Luxembourg vs. Zimbabwe ==
Luxembourg
2
Ramat HaSharon, Israel
25 March 1996
Hard (outdoors)

Zimbabwe
1

			1	2	3
1	(Luxembourg) (Zimbabwe)	Fabienne Thill; Cara Black	6; 3	2; 2		retired
2	(Luxembourg) (Zimbabwe)	Anne Kremer; Julia Muir	6; 1	3; 6	6; 3
3	(Luxembourg) (Zimbabwe)	Alexandra Scholer / Fabienne Thill; Paula Iversen / Julia Muir	3; 6	2; 6

== Luxembourg vs. Estonia ==
Luxembourg
2
Ramat HaSharon, Israel
26 March 1996
Hard (outdoors)

Estonia
1

			1	2	3
1	(Luxembourg) (Estonia)	Anne Kremer; Helen Laupa	6; 1	6; 4
2	(Luxembourg) (Estonia)	Fabienne Thill; Helene Holter	2; 6	1; 6
3	(Luxembourg) (Estonia)	Anne Kremer / Alexandra Scholer; Helene Holter / Helen Laupa	7^{7} 6^{5}	6; 2

== Zimbabwe vs. Macedonia ==
Zimbabwe
3
Ramat HaSharon, Israel
26 March 1996
Hard (outdoors)

Macedonia
0

			1	2	3
1	(Zimbabwe) (North Macedonia)	Julia Muir; Marina Lazarovska	6; 1	6; 2
2	(Zimbabwe) (North Macedonia)	Paula Iversen; Irena Mihailova	6; 4	5; 7	6; 3
3	(Zimbabwe) (North Macedonia)	Paula Iversen / Julia Muir; Marina Lazarovska / Irena Mihailova	6; 4	6; 3

== Israel vs. Zimbabwe ==
Israel
3
Ramat HaSharon, Israel
27 March 1996
Hard (outdoors)

Zimbabwe
0

			1	2	3
1	(Israel) (Zimbabwe)	Nataly Cahana; Paula Iversen	6; 2	6; 2
2	(Israel) (Zimbabwe)	Hila Rosen; Julia Muir	6; 2	7^{7} 6^{2}
3	(Israel) (Zimbabwe)	Nataly Cahana / Tzipora Obziler; Paula Iversen / Julia Muir	6; 4	6; 3

== Luxembourg vs. Macedonia ==
Luxembourg
2
Ramat HaSharon, Israel
27 March 1996
Hard (outdoors)

Macedonia
1

			1	2	3
1	(Luxembourg) (North Macedonia)	Fabienne Thill; Ivona Mihailova	3; 6	2; 6
2	(Luxembourg) (North Macedonia)	Anne Kremer; Marina Lazarovska	6; 3	7^{7} 6^{2}
3	(Luxembourg) (North Macedonia)	Anne Kremer / Alexandra Scholer; Irena Mihailova / Ivona Mihailova	6; 2	6; 4

== Israel vs. Macedonia ==
Israel
3
Ramat HaSharon, Israel
28 March 1996
Hard (outdoors)

Macedonia
0

			1	2	3
1	(Israel) (North Macedonia)	Anna Smashnova; Marina Lazarovska	6; 1	6; 1
2	(Israel) (North Macedonia)	Hila Rosen; Irena Mihailova	6; 2	6; 0
3	(Israel) (North Macedonia)	Nataly Cahana / Tzipora Obziler; Marina Lazarovska / Irena Mihailova	6; 3	6; 2

== Estonia vs. Zimbabwe ==
Estonia
3
Ramat HaSharon, Israel
28 March 1996
Hard (outdoors)

Zimbabwe
0

			1	2	3
1	(Estonia) (Zimbabwe)	Helen Laupa; Julia Muir	2; 6	6; 3	6; 3
2	(Estonia) (Zimbabwe)	Liina Suurvarik; Paula Iversen	6; 4	1; 6	6; 4
3	(Estonia) (Zimbabwe)	Helene Holter / Liina Suurvarik; Paula Iversen / Julia Muir	6; 4	6; 1

== Israel vs. Luxembourg ==
Israel
2
Ramat HaSharon, Israel
29 March 1996
Hard (outdoors)

Luxembourg
1

			1	2	3
1	(Israel) (Luxembourg)	Anna Smashnova; Anne Kremer	5; 7	5; 7
2	(Israel) (Luxembourg)	Hila Rosen; Alexandra Scholer	6; 0	6; 2
3	(Israel) (Luxembourg)	Nataly Cahana / Tzipora Obziler; Anne Kremer / Alexandra Scholer	6; 2	6; 1

== Estonia vs. Macedonia ==
Estonia
2
Ramat HaSharon, Israel
29 March 1996
Hard (outdoors)

Macedonia
1

			1	2	3
1	(Estonia) (North Macedonia)	Helen Laupa; Ivona Mihailova	4; 1			retired
2	(Estonia) (North Macedonia)	Helene Holter; Irena Mihailova	6; 1	6; 4
3	(Estonia) (North Macedonia)	Helene Holter / Helen Laupa; Marina Lazarovska / Irena Mihailova	3; 6	4; 6

== See also ==
- Fed Cup structure
