= 1987 Federation Cup (tennis) =

International women's tennis competition

Details
- Duration: 26 July – 2 August
- Edition: 25th

Champion
- Winning nation: West Germany

The 1987 Federation Cup was the 25th edition of the most important competition between national teams in women's tennis. The tournament was held at Hollyburn Country Club in Vancouver, Canada, from 26 July – 2 August. West Germany won their first title, defeating the United States in the final. This was their first victory after four previous final appearances.

== Qualifying round ==
All ties were played at Hollyburn Country Club in Vancouver, Canada, on hard courts.

Winning team	Score	Losing team
Israel	3–0	Zimbabwe
Norway	3–0	Peru
Denmark	3–0	Luxembourg
South Korea	2–1	Mexico
Chile	2–1	China
Ireland	3–0	Chinese Taipei
Poland	2–1	Philippines
Jamaica	w/o	Thailand
Indonesia	2–1	Finland
Switzerland	3–0	Malta

Winning nations advance to Main Draw, losing nations play in Consolation rounds.

=== Israel vs. Zimbabwe ===
Israel
3
Hollyburn Country Club, Vancouver, British Columbia, Canada
July 1987
Hard

Zimbabwe
0

			1	2	3
1	(Israel) (Zimbabwe)	Dalia Koriat; Paula Iversen	6; 4	6; 2
2	(Israel) (Zimbabwe)	Ilana Berger; Julia Muir	6; 1	6; 3
3	(Israel) (Zimbabwe)	Ilana Berger / Dalia Koriat; Paula Iversen / Julia Muir	6; 1	6; 1

=== Norway vs. Peru ===
Norway
3
Hollyburn Country Club, Vancouver, British Columbia, Canada
July 1987
Hard

Peru
0

			1	2	3
1	(Norway) (Peru)	Monica Wiese; Karina Heck	6; 3	4; 6	9; 7
2	(Norway) (Peru)	Amy Jönsson Raaholt; Karim Strohmeier Merino	6; 0	6; 0
3	(Norway) (Peru)	Amy Jönsson Raaholt / Monica Wiese; Paloma Collantes / Karim Strohmeier Merino	6; 0	7; 5

=== Denmark vs. Luxembourg ===
Denmark
3
Hollyburn Country Club, Vancouver, British Columbia, Canada
July 1987
Hard

Luxembourg
0

			1	2	3
1	(Denmark) (Luxembourg)	Lone Vandborg; Ginette Huberty	6; 0	6; 2
2	(Denmark) (Luxembourg)	Tine Scheuer-Larsen; Karin Kschwendt	6; 2	3; 6	6; 4
3	(Denmark) (Luxembourg)	Tine Scheuer-Larsen / Lone Vandborg; Ginette Huberty / Karin Kschwendt	6; 3	6; 3

=== South Korea vs. Mexico ===
South Korea
2
Hollyburn Country Club, Vancouver, British Columbia, Canada
July 1987
Hard

Mexico
1

			1	2	3
1	(South Korea) (Mexico)	Kim Il-soon; Lucila Becerra	6; 3	6; 7	6; 3
2	(South Korea) (Mexico)	Cho Eun-ok; Claudia Hernández	4; 6	0; 6
3	(South Korea) (Mexico)	Kim Il-soon / Lee Jeong-soon; Lucila Becerra / Claudia Hernández	6; 1	6; 4

=== Chile vs. China ===
Chile
2
Hollyburn Country Club, Vancouver, British Columbia, Canada
July 1987
Hard

China
1

			1	2	3
1	(Chile) (China)	Carolina Espinoza; Li Xinyi	0; 6	7; 6	6; 3
2	(Chile) (China)	Macarena Miranda; Sun Yan	1; 6	6; 4	1; 6
3	(Chile) (China)	Carolina Espinoza / Macarena Miranda; Li Xinyi / Zhong Ni	6; 4	7; 5

=== Ireland vs. Chinese Taipei ===
Ireland
3
Hollyburn Country Club, Vancouver, British Columbia, Canada
July 1987
Hard

Chinese Taipei
0

			1	2	3
1	(Republic of Ireland) (Chinese Taipei)	Siobhán Nicholson; Lai Su-lin	6; 3	7; 5
2	(Republic of Ireland) (Chinese Taipei)	Jennifer Thornton; Lin Shi-min	6; 1	6; 1
3	(Republic of Ireland) (Chinese Taipei)	Siobhán Nicholson / Lesley O'Halloran; Lin Shi-min / Wang Sai-hwa	6; 2	6; 0

=== Poland vs. Philippines ===
Poland
2
Hollyburn Country Club, Vancouver, British Columbia, Canada
July 1987
Hard

Philippines
1

			1	2	3
1	(Poland) (Philippines)	Ewa Zerdecka; Jennifer Saberon	7; 6	6; 4
2	(Poland) (Philippines)	Renata Skrzypczyńska; Dyan Castillejo	1; 6	7; 5	3; 6
3	(Poland) (Philippines)	Renata Skrzypczyńska / Ewa Zerdecka; Sarah Rafael / Jennifer Saberon	6; 3	6; 4

=== Indonesia vs. Finland ===
Indonesia
2
Hollyburn Country Club, Vancouver, British Columbia, Canada
July 1987
Hard

Finland
1

			1	2	3
1	(Indonesia) (Finland)	Suzanna Anggarkusuma; Marianna Ansio	4; 6	6; 4	6; 4
2	(Indonesia) (Finland)	Yayuk Basuki; Anne Aallonen	4; 6	5; 7
3	(Indonesia) (Finland)	Suzanna Anggarkusuma / Yayuk Basuki; Anne Aallonen / Laura Mannisto	6; 4	6; 2

=== Switzerland vs. Malta ===
Switzerland
3
Hollyburn Country Club, Vancouver, British Columbia, Canada
July 1987
Hard

Malta
0

			1	2	3
1	(Switzerland) (Malta)	Emanuela Zardo; Helen Asciak	7; 5	6; 1
2	(Switzerland) (Malta)	Eva Krapl; Carol Cassar-Torreggiani	6; 0	6; 2
3	(Switzerland) (Malta)	Céline Cohen / Eva Krapl; Carol Cassar-Torreggiani / Alexia Gera	6; 2	6; 1

== Main draw ==
Participating Teams
Argentina	Australia	Austria	Belgium	Brazil	Bulgaria	Canada	Chile
Czechoslovakia	Denmark	France	Great Britain	Greece	Hong Kong	Indonesia	Ireland
Israel	Italy	Jamaica	Japan	Netherlands	New Zealand	Norway	Poland
South Korea	Soviet Union	Spain	Sweden	Switzerland	United States	West Germany	Yugoslavia

First Round
United States	3
Japan	0
France	3
Austria	0
Great Britain	3
Q	Chile	0
Belgium	1
Italy	2
Bulgaria	2
Greece	1
Q	Ireland	0
Q	Indonesia	3
Q	Jamaica	0
Spain	3
Q	Denmark	0
Australia	3
Argentina	3
Q	Switzerland	0
Brazil	1
New Zealand	2
Q	Norway	1
Q	South Korea	2
Hong Kong	0
West Germany	3
Canada	3
Netherlands	0
Q	Israel	0
Soviet Union	3
Q	Poland	1
Yugoslavia	2
Sweden	0
Czechoslovakia	3

Second Round
United States	3
France	0
Great Britain	2
Italy	1
Bulgaria	2
Q	Indonesia	1
Spain	1
Australia	2
Argentina	3
New Zealand	0
Q	South Korea	0
West Germany	3
Canada	2
Soviet Union	1
Yugoslavia	0
Czechoslovakia	3

Quarterfinals
United States	3
Great Britain	0
Bulgaria	2
Australia	0
Argentina	1
West Germany	2
Canada	1
Czechoslovakia	2

Semifinals
United States	3
Bulgaria	0
West Germany	2
Czechoslovakia	1

Final
United States	1
West Germany	2

1st Round losing teams play in Consolation rounds

=== First round ===
==== United States vs. Japan ====
United States
3
Hollyburn Country Club, Vancouver, British Columbia, Canada
July 1987
Hard

Japan
0

			1	2	3
1	(United States) (Japan)	Pam Shriver; Akiko Kijimuta	7; 6	6; 1
2	(United States) (Japan)	Chris Evert; Etsuko Inoue	6; 2	6; 4
3	(United States) (Japan)	Chris Evert / Zina Garrison; Etsuko Inoue / Akiko Kijimuta	6; 2	7; 5

==== France vs. Austria ====
France
3
Hollyburn Country Club, Vancouver, British Columbia, Canada
July 1987
Hard

Austria
0

			1	2	3
1	(France) (Austria)	Isabelle Demongeot; Petra Huber	6; 1	6; 4
2	(France) (Austria)	Nathalie Tauziat; Judith Wiesner	6; 3	7; 5
3	(France) (Austria)	Isabelle Demongeot / Catherine Tanvier; Petra Huber / Judith Wiesner	1; 6	6; 3	6; 1

==== Great Britain vs. Chile ====
Great Britain
3
Hollyburn Country Club, Vancouver, British Columbia, Canada
July 1987
Hard

Chile
0

			1	2	3
1	(United Kingdom) (Chile)	Sara Gomer; Carolina Espinoza	6; 3	6; 1
2	(United Kingdom) (Chile)	Jo Durie; Macarena Miranda	6; 2	6; 1
3	(United Kingdom) (Chile)	Jo Durie / Anne Hobbs; Carolina Espinoza / Macarena Miranda	6; 1	6; 0

==== Belgium vs. Italy ====
Belgium
1
Hollyburn Country Club, Vancouver, British Columbia, Canada
July 1987
Hard

Italy
2

			1	2	3
1	(Belgium) (Italy)	Sandra Wasserman; Sandra Cecchini	1; 6	0; 6
2	(Belgium) (Italy)	Ann Devries; Raffaella Reggi	2; 6	5; 7
3	(Belgium) (Italy)	Ann Devries / Sandra Wasserman; Laura Garrone / Caterina Nozzoli	6; 3	6; 1

==== Bulgaria vs. Greece ====
Bulgaria
2
Hollyburn Country Club, Vancouver, British Columbia, Canada
July 1987
Hard

Greece
1

			1	2	3
1	(Bulgaria) (Greece)	Katerina Maleeva; Olga Tsarbopoulou	6; 0	6; 0
2	(Bulgaria) (Greece)	Manuela Maleeva; Angeliki Kanellopoulou	6; 0	6; 0
3	(Bulgaria) (Greece)	Yulia Berberian / Dora Rangelova; Angeliki Kanellopoulou / Olga Tsarbopoulou	2; 6	4; 6

==== Ireland vs. Indonesia ====
Ireland
0
Hollyburn Country Club, Vancouver, British Columbia, Canada
July 1987
Hard

Indonesia
3

			1	2	3
1	(Republic of Ireland) (Indonesia)	Siobhán Nicholson; Suzanna Anggarkusuma	7; 5	4; 6	3; 6
2	(Republic of Ireland) (Indonesia)	Jennifer Thornton; Yayuk Basuki	4; 6	2; 6
3	(Republic of Ireland) (Indonesia)	Rhonda Howett / Lesley O'Halloran; Yayuk Basuki / Waya Walalangi	6; 7	3; 6

==== Jamaica vs. Spain ====
Jamaica
0
Hollyburn Country Club, Vancouver, British Columbia, Canada
July 1987
Hard

Spain
3

			1	2	3
1	(Jamaica) (Spain)	Henrietta Harris; María José Llorca	1; 6	2; 6
2	(Jamaica) (Spain)	Joni Van Ryck De Groot; Arantxa Sánchez Vicario	3; 6	1; 6
3	(Jamaica) (Spain)	Henrietta Harris / Joni Van Ryck De Groot; María José Llorca / Arantxa Sánchez Vicario	6; 7	2; 6

==== Denmark vs. Australia ====
Denmark
0
Hollyburn Country Club, Vancouver, British Columbia, Canada
July 1987
Hard

Australia
3

			1	2	3
1	(Denmark) (Australia)	Lone Vandborg; Anne Minter	2; 6	0; 6
2	(Denmark) (Australia)	Tine Scheuer-Larsen; Elizabeth Smylie	7; 5	4; 6	0; 6
3	(Denmark) (Australia)	Tine Scheuer-Larsen / Lone Vandborg; Jenny Byrne / Wendy Turnbull	4; 6	6; 2	2; 6

==== Argentina vs. Switzerland ====
Argentina
3
Hollyburn Country Club, Vancouver, British Columbia, Canada
July 1987
Hard

Switzerland
0

			1	2	3
1	(Argentina) (Switzerland)	Bettina Fulco; Emanuela Zardo	6; 4	6; 2
2	(Argentina) (Switzerland)	Gabriela Sabatini; Eva Krapl	6; 2	6; 1
3	(Argentina) (Switzerland)	Mercedes Paz / Gabriela Sabatini; Céline Cohen / Eva Krapl	6; 2	6; 0

==== Brazil vs. New Zealand ====
Brazil
1
Hollyburn Country Club, Vancouver, British Columbia, Canada
July 1987
Hard

New Zealand
2

			1	2	3
1	(Brazil) (New Zealand)	Niege Dias; Belinda Cordwell	1; 6	3; 6
2	(Brazil) (New Zealand)	Patricia Medrado; Julie Richardson	7; 5	6; 2
3	(Brazil) (New Zealand)	Niege Dias / Patricia Medrado; Belinda Cordwell / Julie Richardson	6; 4	5; 7	3; 6

==== Norway vs. South Korea ====
Norway
1
Hollyburn Country Club, Vancouver, British Columbia, Canada
July 1987
Hard

South Korea
2

			1	2	3
1	(Norway) (South Korea)	Monica Wiese; Lee Jeong-myung	0; 6	1; 6
2	(Norway) (South Korea)	Amy Jönsson Raaholt; Kim Il-soon	6; 1	5; 7	11; 9
3	(Norway) (South Korea)	Amy Jönsson Raaholt / Stine Vogt-Andersen; Kim Il-soon / Lee Jeong-myung	2; 6	0; 6

==== Hong Kong vs. West Germany ====
Hong Kong
0
Hollyburn Country Club, Vancouver, British Columbia, Canada
July 1987
Hard

West Germany
3

			1	2	3
1	(Hong Kong) (West Germany)	Paulette Moreno; Claudia Kohde-Kilsch	0; 6	2; 6
2	(Hong Kong) (West Germany)	Patricia Hy; Steffi Graf	7; 6	2; 6	4; 6
3	(Hong Kong) (West Germany)	Patricia Hy / Paulette Moreno; Bettina Bunge / Silke Meier	1; 6	1; 6

==== Canada vs. Netherlands ====
Canada
3
Hollyburn Country Club, Vancouver, British Columbia, Canada
July 1987
Hard

Netherlands
0

			1	2	3
1	(Canada) (Netherlands)	Helen Kelesi; Marianne van der Torre	6; 4	6; 2
2	(Canada) (Netherlands)	Carling Bassett; Marcella Mesker	4; 6	7; 5	6; 2
3	(Canada) (Netherlands)	Carling Bassett / Jill Hetherington; Marcella Mesker / Marianne van der Torre	6; 4	6; 2

==== Israel vs. Soviet Union ====
Israel
0
Hollyburn Country Club, Vancouver, British Columbia, Canada
July 1987
Hard

Soviet Union
3

			1	2	3
1	(Israel) (Soviet Union)	Dalia Koriat; Natasha Zvereva	1; 6	2; 6
2	(Israel) (Soviet Union)	Ilana Berger; Larisa Savchenko	3; 6	2; 6
3	(Israel) (Soviet Union)	Ilana Berger / Dalia Koriat; Svetlana Cherneva / Larisa Savchenko	1; 6	1; 6

==== Poland vs. Yugoslavia ====
Poland
1
Hollyburn Country Club, Vancouver, British Columbia, Canada
July 1987
Hard

Yugoslavia
2

			1	2	3
1	(Poland) (Socialist Federal Republic of Yugoslavia)	Ewa Zerdecka; Karmen Škulj	7; 5	6; 2
2	(Poland) (Socialist Federal Republic of Yugoslavia)	Renata Skrzypczyńska; Sabrina Goleš	3; 6	1; 6
3	(Poland) (Socialist Federal Republic of Yugoslavia)	Renata Skrzypczyńska / Ewa Zerdecka; Sabrina Goleš / Renata Šašak	2; 6	4; 6

==== Sweden vs. Czechoslovakia ====
Sweden
0
Hollyburn Country Club, Vancouver, British Columbia, Canada
July 1987
Hard

Czechoslovakia
3

			1	2	3
1	(Sweden) (Czechoslovakia)	Carina Karlsson; Helena Suková	4; 6	4; 6
2	(Sweden) (Czechoslovakia)	Catarina Lindqvist; Hana Mandlíková	3; 6	2; 6
3	(Sweden) (Czechoslovakia)	Catarina Lindqvist / Maria Lindström; Hana Mandlíková / Jana Novotná	3; 6	2; 6

=== Second round ===
==== United States vs. France ====
United States
3
Hollyburn Country Club, Vancouver, British Columbia, Canada
July 1987
Hard

France
0

			1	2	3
1	(United States) (France)	Pam Shriver; Isabelle Demongeot	6; 0	7; 6
2	(United States) (France)	Chris Evert; Nathalie Tauziat	6; 1	6; 0
3	(United States) (France)	Chris Evert / Pam Shriver; Isabelle Demongeot / Catherine Tanvier	6; 3	6; 3

==== Great Britain vs. Italy ====
Great Britain
2
Hollyburn Country Club, Vancouver, British Columbia, Canada
July 1987
Hard

Italy
1

			1	2	3
1	(United Kingdom) (Italy)	Sara Gomer; Sandra Cecchini	6; 7	6; 1	6; 3
2	(United Kingdom) (Italy)	Jo Durie; Raffaella Reggi	5; 7	4; 6
3	(United Kingdom) (Italy)	Jo Durie / Anne Hobbs; Sandra Cecchini / Raffaella Reggi	6; 7	7; 5	6; 4

==== Bulgaria vs. Indonesia ====
Bulgaria
2
Hollyburn Country Club, Vancouver, British Columbia, Canada
July 1987
Hard

Indonesia
1

			1	2	3
1	(Bulgaria) (Indonesia)	Katerina Maleeva; Suzanna Anggarkusuma	6; 1	6; 1
2	(Bulgaria) (Indonesia)	Manuela Maleeva; Yayuk Basuki	6; 4	6; 0
3	(Bulgaria) (Indonesia)	Yulia Berberian / Dora Rangelova; Suzanna Anggarkusuma / Yayuk Basuki	0; 6	1; 6

==== Spain vs. Australia ====
Spain
1
Hollyburn Country Club, Vancouver, British Columbia, Canada
July 1987
Hard

Australia
2

			1	2	3
1	(Spain) (Australia)	María José Llorca; Anne Minter	6; 4	6; 4
2	(Spain) (Australia)	Arantxa Sánchez Vicario; Elizabeth Smylie	1; 6	6; 4	1; 6
3	(Spain) (Australia)	María José Llorca / Arantxa Sánchez Vicario; Elizabeth Smylie / Wendy Turnbull	1; 6	2; 6

==== Argentina vs. New Zealand ====
Argentina
3
Hollyburn Country Club, Vancouver, British Columbia, Canada
July 1987
Hard

New Zealand
0

			1	2	3
1	(Argentina) (New Zealand)	Bettina Fulco; Julie Richardson	6; 3	6; 4
2	(Argentina) (New Zealand)	Gabriela Sabatini; Belinda Cordwell	6; 3	7; 5
3	(Argentina) (New Zealand)	Mercedes Paz / Gabriela Sabatini; Belinda Cordwell / Julie Richardson	4; 6	6; 3	6; 1

==== South Korea vs. West Germany ====
South Korea
0
Hollyburn Country Club, Vancouver, British Columbia, Canada
July 1987
Hard

West Germany
3

			1	2	3
1	(South Korea) (West Germany)	Lee Jeong-myung; Claudia Kohde-Kilsch	2; 6	1; 6
2	(South Korea) (West Germany)	Kim Il-soon; Steffi Graf	1; 6	1; 6
3	(South Korea) (West Germany)	Kim Il-soon / Lee Jeong-myung; Steffi Graf / Claudia Kohde-Kilsch	1; 6	0; 6

==== Canada vs. Soviet Union ====
Canada
2
Hollyburn Country Club, Vancouver, British Columbia, Canada
July 1987
Hard

Soviet Union
1

			1	2	3
1	(Canada) (Soviet Union)	Helen Kelesi; Natasha Zvereva	3; 6	6; 4	6; 3
2	(Canada) (Soviet Union)	Carling Bassett; Larisa Savchenko	7; 5	4; 6	4; 6
3	(Canada) (Soviet Union)	Jill Hetherington / Helen Kelesi; Svetlana Cherneva / Larisa Savchenko	6; 4	6; 3

==== Yugoslavia vs. Czechoslovakia ====
Yugoslavia
0
Hollyburn Country Club, Vancouver, British Columbia, Canada
July 1987
Hard

Czechoslovakia
3

			1	2	3
1	(Socialist Federal Republic of Yugoslavia) (Czechoslovakia)	Karmen Škulj; Helena Suková	2; 6	3; 6
2	(Socialist Federal Republic of Yugoslavia) (Czechoslovakia)	Sabrina Goleš; Hana Mandlíková	4; 6	3; 6
3	(Socialist Federal Republic of Yugoslavia) (Czechoslovakia)	Sabrina Goleš / Renata Šašak; Jana Novotná / Regina Rajchrtová	4; 6	7; 5	4; 6

=== Quarterfinals ===
==== United States vs. Great Britain ====
United States
3
Hollyburn Country Club, Vancouver, British Columbia, Canada
July 1987
Hard

Great Britain
0

			1	2	3
1	(United States) (United Kingdom)	Pam Shriver; Sara Gomer	6; 1	6; 3
2	(United States) (United Kingdom)	Chris Evert; Jo Durie	6; 3	6; 1
3	(United States) (United Kingdom)	Elise Burgin / Zina Garrison; Jo Durie / Anne Hobbs	7; 5	7; 5

==== Bulgaria vs. Australia ====
Bulgaria
2
Hollyburn Country Club, Vancouver, British Columbia, Canada
July 1987
Hard

Australia
0

			1	2	3
1	(Bulgaria) (Australia)	Katerina Maleeva; Anne Minter	6; 2	6; 2
2	(Bulgaria) (Australia)	Manuela Maleeva; Elizabeth Smylie	6; 4	6; 4
3	(Bulgaria) (Australia)					not played

==== Argentina vs. West Germany ====
Argentina
1
Hollyburn Country Club, Vancouver, British Columbia, Canada
July 1987
Hard

West Germany
2

			1	2	3
1	(Argentina) (West Germany)	Bettina Fulco; Claudia Kohde-Kilsch	2; 6	2; 6
2	(Argentina) (West Germany)	Gabriela Sabatini; Steffi Graf	4; 6	4; 6
3	(Argentina) (West Germany)	Mercedes Paz / Gabriela Sabatini; Bettina Bunge / Silke Meier	6^{2} 7^{7}	6; 1	6; 2

==== Canada vs. Czechoslovakia ====
Canada
1
Hollyburn Country Club, Vancouver, British Columbia, Canada
July 1987
Hard

Czechoslovakia
2

			1	2	3
1	(Canada) (Czechoslovakia)	Helen Kelesi; Helena Suková	4; 6	6; 1	6; 2
2	(Canada) (Czechoslovakia)	Carling Bassett; Hana Mandlíková	4; 6	1; 6
3	(Canada) (Czechoslovakia)	Jill Hetherington / Helen Kelesi; Hana Mandlíková / Helena Suková	6^{3} 7^{7}	2; 6

=== Semifinals ===
==== United States vs. Bulgaria ====
United States
3
Hollyburn Country Club, Vancouver, British Columbia, Canada
1 August 1987
Hard

Bulgaria
0

			1	2	3
1	(United States) (Bulgaria)	Pam Shriver; Katerina Maleeva	6; 3	7; 6
2	(United States) (Bulgaria)	Chris Evert; Manuela Maleeva	6; 2	2; 6	6; 4
3	(United States) (Bulgaria)	Chris Evert / Pam Shriver; Katerina Maleeva / Dora Rangelova	6; 1	6; 1

==== West Germany vs. Czechoslovakia ====
West Germany
2
Hollyburn Country Club, Vancouver, British Columbia, Canada
1 August 1987
Hard

Czechoslovakia
1

			1	2	3
1	(West Germany) (Czechoslovakia)	Claudia Kohde-Kilsch; Helena Suková	6; 7	5; 7
2	(West Germany) (Czechoslovakia)	Steffi Graf; Hana Mandlíková	6; 4	6; 1
3	(West Germany) (Czechoslovakia)	Steffi Graf / Claudia Kohde-Kilsch; Hana Mandlíková / Helena Suková	7; 5	6; 2

=== Final ===
==== United States vs. West Germany ====
United States
1
Hollyburn Country Club, Vancouver, British Columbia, Canada
2 August 1987
Hard

West Germany
2

			1	2	3
1	(United States) (West Germany)	Pam Shriver; Claudia Kohde-Kilsch	6; 0	7; 6
2	(United States) (West Germany)	Chris Evert; Steffi Graf	2; 6	1; 6
3	(United States) (West Germany)	Chris Evert / Pam Shriver; Steffi Graf / Claudia Kohde-Kilsch	6; 1	5; 7	4; 6

1987 Federation Cup Champions
(West Germany)
West Germany
First title

== Consolation rounds ==
=== Draw ===
Consolation first round
Mexico	2
Norway	1
Poland	0
Ireland	3
Peru	2
Malta	1
Hong Kong	3
Finland	0
Jamaica	0
Netherlands	3
Philippines	0
Zimbabwe	3
China	0
Switzerland	3
Israel	3
Chinese Taipei	0
Chile	0
Luxembourg	3

Consolation second round
Sweden	3
Mexico	0
Denmark	2
Ireland	1
Brazil	3
Peru	0
Belgium	0
Hong Kong	3
Netherlands	3
Zimbabwe	0
Switzerland	2
Japan	1
Israel	2
Greece	1
Luxembourg	0
Austria	3

Consolation quarterfinals
Sweden	2
Denmark	1
Brazil	0
Hong Kong	2
Netherlands	3
Switzerland	0
Israel	0
Austria	2

Consolation semifinals
Sweden	1
Hong Kong	2
Netherlands	2
Austria	0

Consolation final
Hong Kong	1
Netherlands	2

=== First round ===
==== Mexico vs. Norway ====
Mexico
2
I. Czech Lawn Tennis Club, Prague, Czechoslovakia
July 1986
Red clay (outdoors)

Norway
1

			1	2	3
1	(Mexico) (Norway)	Lucila Becerra; Monica Wiese	6; 4	6; 2
2	(Mexico) (Norway)	Claudia Hernández; Amy Jönsson Raaholt	0; 6	1; 6
3	(Mexico) (Norway)	Lucila Becerra / Alejandra Vallejo; Amy Jönsson Raaholt / Monica Wiese	6; 3	6; 1

==== Poland vs. Ireland ====
Poland
0
Hollyburn Country Club, Vancouver, British Columbia, Canada
July 1987
Hard

Ireland
3

			1	2	3
1	(Poland) (Republic of Ireland)	Ewa Zerdecka; Siobhán Nicholson	6; 7	3; 6
2	(Poland) (Republic of Ireland)	Renata Skrzypczyńska; Jennifer Thornton	3; 6	1; 6
3	(Poland) (Republic of Ireland)	Renata Skrzypczyńska / Ewa Zerdecka; Rhona Howett / Lesley O'Halloran	4; 6	1; 6

==== Peru vs. Malta ====
Peru
2
Hollyburn Country Club, Vancouver, British Columbia, Canada
July 1987
Hard

Malta
1

			1	2	3
1	(Peru) (Malta)	Paloma Collantes; Helen Asciak	6; 7	7; 6	6; 1
2	(Peru) (Malta)	Karim Strohmeier Merino; Carol Cassar-Torreggiani	6; 4	6; 2
3	(Peru) (Malta)	Paloma Collantes / Karina Heck; Carol Cassar-Torreggiani / Alexia Gera	4; 6	2; 6

==== Hong Kong vs. Finland ====
Hong Kong
0
I. Czech Lawn Tennis Club, Prague, Czechoslovakia
July 1986
Red clay (outdoors)

Finland
3

			1	2	3
1	(Hong Kong) (Finland)	Paulette Moreno; Marianna Ansio	7; 5	6; 1
2	(Hong Kong) (Finland)	Patricia Hy; Anne Aallonen	6; 2	6; 1
3	(Hong Kong) (Finland)	Patricia Hy / Paulette Moreno; Anne Aallonen / Laura Mannisto	6; 1	6; 2

==== Jamaica vs. Netherlands ====
Jamaica
0
Hollyburn Country Club, Vancouver, British Columbia, Canada
July 1987
Hard

Netherlands
3

			1	2	3
1	(Jamaica) (Netherlands)	Henrietta Harris; Marianne van der Torre	1; 6	0; 6
2	(Jamaica) (Netherlands)	Joni Van Ryck De Groot; Marcella Mesker	1; 6	2; 6
3	(Jamaica) (Netherlands)	Henrietta Harris / Joni Van Ryck De Groot; Marcella Mesker / Marianne van der Torre	1; 6	0; 6

==== Philippines vs. Zimbabwe ====
Philippines
0
Hollyburn Country Club, Vancouver, British Columbia, Canada
July 1987
Hard

Zimbabwe
3

			1	2	3
1	(Philippines) (Zimbabwe)	Sarah Rafael; Paula Iversen	1; 6	5; 7
2	(Philippines) (Zimbabwe)	Jennifer Saberon; Julia Muir	6; 2	3; 6	4; 6
3	(Philippines) (Zimbabwe)	Sarah Rafael / Jennifer Saberon; Lesley Barbour / Paula Iversen	5; 7	6; 3	6; 8

==== China vs. Switzerland ====
China
0
Hollyburn Country Club, Vancouver, British Columbia, Canada
July 1987
Hard

Switzerland
3

			1	2	3
1	(China) (Switzerland)	Sun Yan; Emanuela Zardo	6; 7	6; 4	2; 6
2	(China) (Switzerland)	Zhong Ni; Eva Krapl	6; 7	2; 6
3	(China) (Switzerland)	Weng Qin-Di / Zhong Ni; Céline Cohen / Eva Krapl	4; 6	2; 6

==== Israel vs. Chinese Taipei ====
Israel
3
Hollyburn Country Club, Vancouver, British Columbia, Canada
July 1987
Hard

Chinese Taipei
0

			1	2	3
1	(Israel) (Chinese Taipei)	Dalia Koriat; Lai Su-lin	2; 6	7; 6	6; 2
2	(Israel) (Chinese Taipei)	Ilana Berger; Lin Shi-min	6; 1	6; 2
3	(Israel) (Chinese Taipei)	Ilana Berger / Yael Shavit; Lin Ya-hui / Wang Dai-hwa	6; 2	6; 3

==== Chile vs. Luxembourg ====
Chile
0
Hollyburn Country Club, Vancouver, British Columbia, Canada
July 1987
Hard

Luxembourg
3

			1	2	3
1	(Chile) (Luxembourg)	Eugenia Escarate; Ginette Huberty	5; 7	5; 7
2	(Chile) (Luxembourg)	Macarena Miranda; Karin Kschwendt	0; 6	0; 6
3	(Chile) (Luxembourg)	Carolina Espinoza / Macarena Miranda; Ginette Huberty / Karin Kschwendt	4; 6	6; 3	1; 6

=== Second round ===
==== Sweden vs. Mexico ====
Sweden
3
I. Czech Lawn Tennis Club, Prague, Czechoslovakia
July 1986
Red clay (outdoors)

Mexico
0

			1	2	3
1	(Sweden) (Mexico)	Carina Karlsson; Lucila Becerra	6; 1	6; 3
2	(Sweden) (Mexico)	Catarina Lindqvist; Claudia Hernández	6; 2	6; 1
3	(Sweden) (Mexico)	Catrin Jexell / Maria Lindström; Xóchitl Escobedo / Alejandra Vallejo	6; 2	6; 1

==== Denmark vs. Ireland ====
Denmark
2
Hollyburn Country Club, Vancouver, British Columbia, Canada
July 1987
Hard

Ireland
1

			1	2	3
1	(Denmark) (Republic of Ireland)	Lone Vandborg; Siobhán Nicholson	6; 7	1; 6
2	(Denmark) (Republic of Ireland)	Tine Scheuer-Larsen; Jennifer Thornton	6; 4	6; 2
3	(Denmark) (Republic of Ireland)	Tine Scheuer-Larsen / Lone Vandborg; Siobhán Nicholson / Lesley O'Halloran	7; 5	6; 2

==== Brazil vs. Peru ====
Brazil
3
I. Czech Lawn Tennis Club, Prague, Czechoslovakia
July 1986
Red clay (outdoors)

Peru
0

			1	2	3
1	(Brazil) (Peru)	Patricia Medrado; Paloma Collantes	4; 6	7; 6	6; 2
2	(Brazil) (Peru)	Niege Dias; Karim Strohmeier Merino	2; 6	7^{7} 6^{1}	6; 0
3	(Brazil) (Peru)	Niege Dias / Cláudia Monteiro; Paloma Collantes / Karim Strohmeier Merino	6; 1	6; 7	6; 3

==== Belgium vs. Hong Kong ====
Belgium
0
I. Czech Lawn Tennis Club, Prague, Czechoslovakia
July 1986
Red clay (outdoors)

Hong Kong
3

			1	2	3
1	(Belgium) (Hong Kong)	Sandra Wasserman; Paulette Moreno	2; 6	2; 6
2	(Belgium) (Hong Kong)	Ann Devries; Patricia Hy	3; 6	4; 6
3	(Belgium) (Hong Kong)	Ann Devries / Sandra Wasserman; Patricia Hy / Paulette Moreno	3; 6	3; 6

==== Netherlands vs. Zimbabwe ====
Netherlands
3
Hollyburn Country Club, Vancouver, British Columbia, Canada
July 1987
Hard

Zimbabwe
0

			1	2	3
1	(Netherlands) (Zimbabwe)	Marianne van der Torre; Paula Iversen	6; 1	6; 1
2	(Netherlands) (Zimbabwe)	Marcella Mesker; Julia Muir	6; 0	6; 0
3	(Netherlands) (Zimbabwe)	Marcella Mesker / Marianne van der Torre; Paula Iversen / Julia Muir	6; 2	6; 4

==== Switzerland vs. Japan ====
Switzerland
2
Hollyburn Country Club, Vancouver, British Columbia, Canada
July 1987
Hard

Japan
1

			1	2	3
1	(Switzerland) (Japan)	Emanuela Zardo; Akiko Kijimuta	7; 6	6; 4
2	(Switzerland) (Japan)	Eva Krapl; Etsuko Inoue	6; 2	6; 2
3	(Switzerland) (Japan)	Céline Cohen / Eva Krapl; Emiko Okagawa / Masako Yanagi	3; 6	5; 7

==== Israel vs. Greece ====
Israel
2
Hollyburn Country Club, Vancouver, British Columbia, Canada
July 1987
Hard

Greece
1

			1	2	3
1	(Israel) (Greece)	Dalia Koriat; Olga Tsarbopoulou	2; 6	0; 6
2	(Israel) (Greece)	Ilana Berger; Angeliki Kanellopoulou	4; 6	6; 1	6; 1
3	(Israel) (Greece)	Ilana Berger / Dalia Koriat; Angeliki Kanellopoulou / Olga Tsarbopoulou	6; 3	6; 1

==== Luxembourg vs. Austria ====
Luxembourg
0
Hollyburn Country Club, Vancouver, British Columbia, Canada
July 1987
Hard

Austria
3

			1	2	3
1	(Luxembourg) (Austria)	Ginette Huberty; Petra Huber	1; 6	0; 6
2	(Luxembourg) (Austria)	Karin Kschwendt; Judith Wiesner	0; 6	7; 5	3; 6
3	(Luxembourg) (Austria)	Ginette Huberty / Pascale Welter; Petra Huber / Judith Wiesner	0; 6	0; 6

=== Quarterfinals ===
==== Sweden vs. Denmark ====
Sweden
2
I. Czech Lawn Tennis Club, Prague, Czechoslovakia
July 1986
Red clay (outdoors)

Denmark
1

			1	2	3
1	(Sweden) (Denmark)	Maria Lindström; Lone Vandborg	6; 1	6; 4
2	(Sweden) (Denmark)	Catarina Lindqvist; Tine Scheuer-Larsen	6; 0	6; 4
3	(Sweden) (Denmark)	Catrin Jexell / Maria Lindström; Tine Scheuer-Larsen / Lone Vandborg	6; 2	4; 6	3; 6

==== Brazil vs. Hong Kong ====
Brazil
0
I. Czech Lawn Tennis Club, Prague, Czechoslovakia
July 1986
Red clay (outdoors)

Hong Kong
3

			1	2	3
1	(Brazil) (Hong Kong)	Patricia Medrado; Paulette Moreno	2; 6	6; 4	2; 6
2	(Brazil) (Hong Kong)	Niege Dias; Patricia Hy	2; 6	6; 7
3	(Brazil) (Hong Kong)

==== Netherlands vs. Switzerland ====
Netherlands
3
Hollyburn Country Club, Vancouver, British Columbia, Canada
July 1987
Hard

Switzerland
0

			1	2	3
1	(Netherlands) (Switzerland)	Marianne van der Torre; Céline Cohen	6; 4	6; 3
2	(Netherlands) (Switzerland)	Marcella Mesker; Emanuela Zardo	6; 3	6; 1
3	(Netherlands) (Switzerland)	Marcella Mesker / Marianne van der Torre; Céline Cohen / Emanuela Zardo	6; 0	6; 1

==== Israel vs. Austria ====
Israel
0
Hollyburn Country Club, Vancouver, British Columbia, Canada
July 1987
Hard

Austria
2

			1	2	3
1	(Israel) (Austria)	Yael Shavit; Petra Huber	1; 6	3; 6
2	(Israel) (Austria)	Ilana Berger; Judith Wiesner	2; 6	6; 2	4; 6
3	(Israel) (Austria)					not played

=== Semifinals ===
==== Sweden vs. Hong Kong ====
Sweden
1
I. Czech Lawn Tennis Club, Prague, Czechoslovakia
July 1986
Red clay (outdoors)

Hong Kong
2

			1	2	3
1	(Sweden) (Hong Kong)	Carina Karlsson; Paulette Moreno	4; 6	7; 5	4; 6
2	(Sweden) (Hong Kong)	Catarina Lindqvist; Patricia Hy	7; 6	7; 6
3	(Sweden) (Hong Kong)	Catarina Lindqvist / Maria Lindström; Patricia Hy / Paulette Moreno	6; 0	4; 6	7; 9

==== Netherlands vs. Austria ====
Netherlands
2
Hollyburn Country Club, Vancouver, British Columbia, Canada
July 1987
Hard

Austria
0

			1	2	3
1	(Netherlands) (Austria)	Marianne van der Torre; Petra Huber	6; 2	4; 6	6; 4
2	(Netherlands) (Austria)	Marcella Mesker; Judith Wiesner	7; 5	6; 3
3	(Netherlands) (Austria)					not played

=== Final ===
==== Hong Kong vs. Netherlands ====
Hong Kong
1
Hollyburn Country Club, Vancouver, British Columbia, Canada
July 1987
Hard

Netherlands
2

			1	2	3
1	(Hong Kong) (Netherlands)	Paulette Moreno; Marianne van der Torre	1; 6	1; 6
2	(Hong Kong) (Netherlands)	Patricia Hy; Marcella Mesker	6; 1	6; 1
3	(Hong Kong) (Netherlands)	Patricia Hy / Paulette Moreno; Marcella Mesker / Marianne van der Torre	4; 6	2; 6
