= 1976 Federation Cup (tennis) =

International women's tennis competition

Details
- Duration: 22–29 August
- Edition: 14th

Champion
- Winning nation: United States

The 1976 Federation Cup was the 14th edition of the most important competition between national teams in women's tennis. For the first time, enough teams entered to necessitate pre-qualifying rounds. The tiebreaker also was used for the first time. The tournament was held at The Spectrum in Philadelphia, United States, from 22 to 29 August. The United States defeated Australia in the final, in what was the sixth final between United States and Australia.

== Qualifying round ==
Eight nations played off in July for a place in the main draw.

Venue (surface)	Home team	Score	Visiting team
Austria (Indoor carpet)	Austria	0–3	Luxembourg
Mexico (Indoor carpet)	Mexico	3–0	Ireland
Taiwan (Indoor carpet)	Chinese Taipei	0–3	Philippines
Hanko, Finland (Indoor carpet)	Finland	0–3	Switzerland

Luxembourg, Mexico, Philippines, and Switzerland advanced to Main Draw.

== Main draw ==
Participating Teams
Argentina	Australia	Belgium	Brazil	Canada	Czechoslovakia	Denmark	France
Great Britain	Hungary	Indonesia	Israel	Italy	Japan	Luxembourg	Mexico
Netherlands	New Zealand	Norway	Philippines	Rhodesia	Romania	South Africa	South Korea
Soviet Union	Spain	Sweden	Switzerland	United States	Uruguay	West Germany	Yugoslavia

All ties were played at The Spectrum in Philadelphia, United States, on indoor carpet courts.|}

First Round
Czechoslovakia	w/o
Canada
Indonesia	0
Q	Switzerland	3
Norway	1
Yugoslavia	2
Israel	0
United States	3
New Zealand	1
Argentina	2
Brazil	0
Netherlands	3
Denmark	3
Spain	0
Uruguay
Soviet Union	w/o
France	0
Great Britain	3
Hungary	3
Q	Philippines	0
Sweden	3
Japan	0
South Korea	0
South Africa	3
Italy	3
Q	Luxembourg	0
Q	Mexico	0
West Germany	3
Belgium	2
Rhodesia	1
Romania	0
Australia	3

Second Round
Canada	1
Q	Switzerland	2
Yugoslavia	0
United States	3
Argentina	0
Netherlands	3
Denmark	2
Uruguay	1
Great Britain
Hungary	w/o
Sweden	0
South Africa	3
Italy	0
West Germany	3
Belgium	0
Australia	3

Quarterfinals
Q	Switzerland	0
United States	3
Netherlands	2
Denmark	1
Great Britain	2
South Africa	1
West Germany	0
Australia	3

Semifinals
United States	3
Netherlands	0
Great Britain	0
Australia	3

Final
United States	2
Australia	1

1st Round losing teams play in Consolation Rounds

=== First round ===
==== Indonesia vs. Switzerland ====
Indonesia
0
The Spectrum, Philadelphia, United States
August 1976
Carpet (indoors)

Switzerland
3

			1	2	3
1	(Indonesia) (Switzerland)	Loanita Rachman; Petra Delhees	0; 6	4; 6
2	(Indonesia) (Switzerland)	Yolanda Soemarno; Susi Eichenberg	2; 6	0; 6
3	(Indonesia) (Switzerland)	Elfia Nizarwan / Sriningdiah Sutarniati; Petra Delhees / Monica Simmen	2; 6	1; 6

==== Norway vs. Yugoslavia ====
Norway
1
The Spectrum, Philadelphia, United States
August 1976
Carpet (indoors)

Yugoslavia
2

			1	2	3
1	(Norway) (Socialist Federal Republic of Yugoslavia)	Bente Kjolstad; Dora Alavantić	1; 6	6; 3	3; 6
2	(Norway) (Socialist Federal Republic of Yugoslavia)	Ellen Grindvold; Mima Jaušovec	3; 6	2; 6
3	(Norway) (Socialist Federal Republic of Yugoslavia)	Ellen Grindvold / Kirsten Robsahm; Dora Alavantić / Judita Papistan	6; 0	6; 1

==== Israel vs. United States ====
Israel
0
The Spectrum, Philadelphia, United States
August 1976
Carpet (indoors)

United States
3

			1	2	3
1	(Israel) (United States)	Hagit Zubary; Rosemary Casals	1; 6	0; 6
2	(Israel) (United States)	Paulina Peled; Billie Jean King	1; 6	0; 6
3	(Israel) (United States)	Paulina Peled / Hagit Zubary; Rosemary Casals / Billie Jean King	3; 6	1; 6

==== New Zealand vs. Argentina ====
New Zealand
1
The Spectrum, Philadelphia, United States
August 1976
Carpet (indoors)

Argentina
2

			1	2	3
1	(New Zealand) (Argentina)	Pauline Elliott; Viviana González	5; 7	0; 6
2	(New Zealand) (Argentina)	Judy Chaloner; Raquel Giscafré	1; 6	6; 7
3	(New Zealand) (Argentina)	Judy Chaloner / Chris Newton; Beatriz Araujo / Elvira Weisenberger	7; 5	6; 3

==== Brazil vs. Netherlands ====
Brazil
0
The Spectrum, Philadelphia, United States
August 1976
Carpet (indoors)

Netherlands
3

			1	2	3
1	(Brazil) (Netherlands)	Patricia Medrado; Elly Appel	4; 6	2; 6
2	(Brazil) (Netherlands)	Maria Bueno; Betty Stöve	0; 6	4; 6
3	(Brazil) (Netherlands)	Vera Lúcia Giugni / Patricia Medrado; Betty Stöve / Tine Zwaan	2; 6	1; 6

==== Denmark vs. Spain ====
Denmark
3
The Spectrum, Philadelphia, United States
August 1976
Carpet (indoors)

Spain
0

			1	2	3
1	(Denmark) (Spain)	Anne-Mette Sorensen; Vicky Baldovinos	6; 2	6; 3
2	(Denmark) (Spain)	Helle Sparre; Carmen Perea	6; 3	6; 2
3	(Denmark) (Spain)	Anne-Mette Sorensen / Helle Sparre; Vicky Baldovinos / Carmen Perea	7; 6	6; 3

==== France vs. Great Britain ====
France
0
The Spectrum, Philadelphia, United States
August 1976
Carpet (indoors)

Great Britain
3

			1	2	3
1	(France) (United Kingdom)	Nathalie Fuchs; Sue Barker	3; 6	0; 6
2	(France) (United Kingdom)	Gail Benedetti; Virginia Wade	0; 6	3; 6
3	(France) (United Kingdom)	Rosy Darmon / Gail Benedetti; Sue Barker / Virginia Wade	3; 6	2; 6

==== Hungary vs. Philippines ====
Hungary
3
The Spectrum, Philadelphia, United States
August 1976
Carpet (indoors)

Philippines
0

			1	2	3
1	(Hungary) (Philippines)	Beatrix Klein; Gladys Imperial	6; 0	6; 3
2	(Hungary) (Philippines)	Éva Szabó; Marisa Sanchez	6; 1	6; 0
3	(Hungary) (Philippines)	Beatrix Klein / Éva Szabó; Gladys Imperial / Pia Tamayo	6; 2	6; 0

==== Sweden vs. Japan ====
Sweden
3
The Spectrum, Philadelphia, United States
August 1976
Carpet (indoors)

Japan
0

			1	2	3
1	(Sweden) (Japan)	Helena Anliot; Kiyomi Nakagawa	6; 2	6; 2
2	(Sweden) (Japan)	Ingrid Bentzer; Naoko Sato	6; 4	7; 5
3	(Sweden) (Japan)	Helena Anliot / Mimmi Wikstedt; Mihoka Matshushima / Michiko Saji	6; 0	6; 0

==== South Korea vs. South Africa ====
South Korea
0
The Spectrum, Philadelphia, United States
August 1976
Carpet (indoors)

South Africa
3

			1	2	3
1	(South Korea) (South Africa)	Lee Duk-hee; Linky Boshoff	5; 7	2; 6
2	(South Korea) (South Africa)	Yang Jeong-soon; Annette Du Plooy	2; 6	6; 4	2; 6
3	(South Korea) (South Africa)	Lee Soon-oh / Yang Jeong-soon; Linky Boshoff / Ilana Kloss	2; 6	6; 4	2; 6

==== Italy vs. Luxembourg ====
Italy
3
The Spectrum, Philadelphia, United States
August 1976
Carpet (indoors)

Luxembourg
0

			1	2	3
1	(Italy) (Luxembourg)	Rosalba Vido; Monique Krecke	6; 0	6; 1
2	(Italy) (Luxembourg)	Daniela Marzano; Flore Wagner	7; 5	6; 0
3	(Italy) (Luxembourg)	Daniela Marzano / Manuela Zoni; Flore Wagner / Simone Wolter	6; 1	6; 2

==== Mexico vs. West Germany ====
Mexico
0
The Spectrum, Philadelphia, United States
August 1976
Carpet (indoors)

West Germany
3

			1	2	3
1	(Mexico) (West Germany)	Alina Baraldi; Iris Riedel-Kuhn	2; 6	3; 6
2	(Mexico) (West Germany)	Alejandra Vallejo; Helga Masthoff	3; 6	0; 6
3	(Mexico) (West Germany)	Verónica Martínez / Alejandra Vallejo; Heidi Eisterlehner / Helga Masthoff	3; 6	2; 6

==== Belgium vs. Rhodesia ====
Belgium
2
The Spectrum, Philadelphia, United States
August 1976
Carpet (indoors)

Rhodesia
1

			1	2	3
1	(Belgium) (Rhodesia)	Monique Van Haver; Jenny Waggott	6; 7	4; 6
2	(Belgium) (Rhodesia)	Michele Gurdal; Fiona McKenzie	6; 1	6; 2
3	(Belgium) (Rhodesia)	Michele Gurdal / Monique Van Haver; Fiona McKenzie / Jenny Waggott	3; 6	6; 1	6; 4

==== Romania vs. Australia ====
Romania
0
The Spectrum, Philadelphia, United States
August 1976
Carpet (indoors)

Australia
3

			1	2	3
1	(Romania) (Australia)	Florența Mihai; Kerry Reid	3; 6	0; 6
2	(Romania) (Australia)	Virginia Ruzici; Evonne Goolagong Cawley	2; 6	0; 6
3	(Romania) (Australia)	Florența Mihai / Virginia Ruzici; Dianne Fromholtz / Kerry Reid	6; 4	2; 6	6; 7

=== Second round ===
==== Canada vs. Switzerland ====
Canada
1
The Spectrum, Philadelphia, United States
August 1976
Carpet (indoors)

Switzerland
2

			1	2	3
1	(Canada) (Switzerland)	Barbara Brankovska; Petra Delhees	3; 6	6; 7
2	(Canada) (Switzerland)	Susan Stone; Susi Eichenberger	6; 0	6; 3
3	(Canada) (Switzerland)	Marjorie Blackwood / Susan Stone; Petra Delhees / Monica Simmen	7; 5	2; 6	6; 7

==== Yugoslavia vs. United States ====
Yugoslavia
0
The Spectrum, Philadelphia, United States
August 1976
Carpet (indoors)

United States
3

			1	2	3
1	(Socialist Federal Republic of Yugoslavia) (United States)	Dora Alavantić; Rosemary Casals	1; 6	1; 6
2	(Socialist Federal Republic of Yugoslavia) (United States)	Mima Jaušovec; Billie Jean King	0; 6	6; 7
3	(Socialist Federal Republic of Yugoslavia) (United States)	Dora Alavantić / Mima Jaušovec; Rosemary Casals / Billie Jean King	0; 6	0; 6

==== Argentina vs. Netherlands ====
Argentina
0
The Spectrum, Philadelphia, United States
August 1976
Carpet (indoors)

Netherlands
3

			1	2	3
1	(Argentina) (Netherlands)	Viviana González; Tine Zwaan	1; 6	4; 6
2	(Argentina) (Netherlands)	Raquel Giscafré; Betty Stöve	0; 6	3; 6
3	(Argentina) (Netherlands)	Raquel Giscafré / Elvira Weisenberger; Betty Stöve / Elly Appel	6; 4	2; 6	2; 6

==== Denmark vs. Uruguay ====
Denmark
2
The Spectrum, Philadelphia, United States
August 1976
Carpet (indoors)

Uruguay
1

			1	2	3
1	(Denmark) (Uruguay)	Anne-Mette Sorensen; Carla Guarino de Galeazzi	6; 2	6; 0
2	(Denmark) (Uruguay)	Helle Sparre; Fiorella Bonicelli	3; 6	3; 6
3	(Denmark) (Uruguay)	Anne-Mette Sorensen / Helle Sparre; Fiorella Bonicelli / Carla Guarino de Galeazzi	6; 3	7; 5

==== Sweden vs. South Africa ====
Sweden
0
The Spectrum, Philadelphia, United States
August 1976
Carpet (indoors)

South Africa
3

			1	2	3
1	(Sweden) (South Africa)	Helena Anliot; Linky Boshoff	7; 6	2; 6	3; 6
2	(Sweden) (South Africa)	Ingrid Bentzer; Annette Du Plooy	7; 6	4; 6	3; 6
3	(Sweden) (South Africa)	Helena Anliot / Mimmi Wikstedt; Linky Boshoff / Ilana Kloss	2; 6	2; 6

==== Italy vs. West Germany ====
Italy
0
The Spectrum, Philadelphia, United States
August 1976
Carpet (indoors)

West Germany
3

			1	2	3
1	(Italy) (West Germany)	Rosalba Vido; Iris Riedel-Kuhn	1; 6	2; 6
2	(Italy) (West Germany)	Daniela Marzano; Helga Masthoff	5; 7	4; 6
3	(Italy) (West Germany)	Daniela Marzano / Manuela Zoni; Heidi Eisterlehner / Helga Masthoff	4; 6	6; 3	1; 6

==== Belgium vs. Australia ====
Belgium
0
The Spectrum, Philadelphia, United States
August 1976
Carpet (indoors)

Australia
3

			1	2	3
1	(Belgium) (Australia)	Monique Van Haver; Dianne Fromholtz	0; 6	1; 6
2	(Belgium) (Australia)	Michele Gurdal; Evonne Goolagong Cawley	0; 6	0; 6
3	(Belgium) (Australia)	Michele Gurdal / Monique Van Haver; Evonne Goolagong Cawley / Kerry Reid	2; 6	2; 6

=== Quarterfinals ===
==== Switzerland vs. United States ====
Switzerland
0
The Spectrum, Philadelphia, United States
August 1976
Carpet (indoors)

United States
3

			1	2	3
1	(Switzerland) (United States)	Monica Simmen; Rosemary Casals	1; 6	1; 6
2	(Switzerland) (United States)	Petra Delhees; Billie Jean King	2; 6	1; 6
3	(Switzerland) (United States)	Susi Eichenberger / Monica Simmen; Rosemary Casals / Billie Jean King	0; 6	1; 6

==== Netherlands vs. Denmark ====
Netherlands
2
The Spectrum, Philadelphia, United States
August 1976
Carpet (indoors)

Denmark
1

			1	2	3
1	(Netherlands) (Denmark)	Tine Zwaan; Anne-Mette Sorensen	3; 6	6; 7
2	(Netherlands) (Denmark)	Betty Stöve; Helle Sparre	6; 2	6; 0
3	(Netherlands) (Denmark)	Betty Stöve / Tine Zwaan; Anne-Mette Sorensen / Helle Sparre	6; 1	6; 3

==== Great Britain vs. South Africa ====
Great Britain
2
The Spectrum, Philadelphia, United States
August 1976
Carpet (indoors)

South Africa
1

			1	2	3
1	(United Kingdom) (South Africa)	Sue Barker; Linky Boshoff	6; 1	6; 1
2	(United Kingdom) (South Africa)	Virginia Wade; Annette Du Plooy	6; 0	6; 3
3	(United Kingdom) (South Africa)	Sue Barker / Michelle Tyler; Linky Boshoff / Ilana Kloss	1; 6	4; 6

==== West Germany vs. Australia ====
West Germany
0
The Spectrum, Philadelphia, United States
August 1976
Carpet (indoors)

Australia
3

			1	2	3
1	(West Germany) (Australia)	Iris Riedel-Kuhn; Kerry Reid	1; 6	2; 6
2	(West Germany) (Australia)	Helga Masthoff; Evonne Goolagong Cawley	1; 6	2; 6
3	(West Germany) (Australia)	Heidi Eisterlehner / Helga Masthoff; Evonne Goolagong Cawley / Dianne Fromholtz	3; 6	3; 6

=== Semifinals ===
==== United States vs. Netherlands ====
United States
3
The Spectrum, Philadelphia, United States
August 1976
Carpet (indoors)

Netherlands
0

			1	2	3
1	(United States) (Netherlands)	Rosemary Casals; Elly Appel	6; 1	6; 2
2	(United States) (Netherlands)	Billie Jean King; Betty Stöve	6; 2	6; 3
3	(United States) (Netherlands)	Rosemary Casals / Billie Jean King; Betty Stöve / Tine Zwaan	6; 1	6; 4

==== Great Britain vs. Australia ====
Great Britain
0
The Spectrum, Philadelphia, United States
August 1976
Carpet (indoors)

Australia
3

			1	2	3
1	(United Kingdom) (Australia)	Sue Barker; Dianne Fromholtz	2; 6	6; 7
2	(United Kingdom) (Australia)	Virginia Wade; Evonne Goolagong Cawley	1; 6	2; 6
3	(United Kingdom) (Australia)	Sue Barker / Virginia Wade; Evonne Goolagong Cawley / Kerry Reid	1; 6	3; 6

=== Final ===
==== United States vs. Australia ====
United States
2
The Spectrum, Philadelphia, United States
29 August 1976
Carpet (indoors)

Australia
1

			1	2	3
1	(United States) (Australia)	Rosemary Casals; Kerry Reid	6; 1	3; 6	5; 7
2	(United States) (Australia)	Billie Jean King; Evonne Goolagong Cawley	7^{7} 6^{4}	6; 4
3	(United States) (Australia)	Rosemary Casals / Billie Jean King; Evonne Goolagong Cawley / Kerry Reid	7; 5	6; 3

1976 Federation Cup Champions
(United States)
United States
Fifth title

== Consolation Rounds ==
=== Draw ===
Consolation First Round
France
Czechoslovakia	w/o
Rhodesia
Philippines	w/o
Brazil	2
Luxembourg	1
Japan	2
Israel	1
South Korea	2
Mexico	1
Indonesia	0
New Zealand	3
Norway	1
Spain	2
Soviet Union	w/o
Romania

Consolation Quarterfinals
France	3
Rhodesia	0
Brazil	3
Japan	0
South Korea	3
New Zealand	0
Spain	0
Romania	3

Consolation Semifinals
France	2
Brazil	0
South Korea	0
Romania	3

Consolation Final
France	0
Romania	3

=== First round ===
==== Brazil vs. Luxembourg ====
Brazil
2
The Spectrum, Philadelphia, United States
August 1976
Carpet (indoors)

Luxembourg
1

		1	2	3
1	(Brazil) (Luxembourg)
2	(Brazil) (Luxembourg)
3	(Brazil) (Luxembourg)

==== Japan vs. Israel ====
Japan
2
The Spectrum, Philadelphia, United States
August 1976
Carpet (indoors)

Israel
1

			1	2	3
1	(Japan) (Israel)	Naoko Sato; Paulina Peled	4; 6	2; 6
2	(Japan) (Israel)	Kiyomi Nakagawa; Hagit Zubary	0; 6	6; 2	6; 4
3	(Japan) (Israel)	Kiyomi Nakagawa / Naoko Sato; Paulina Peled / Hagit Zubary	6; 4	6; 2

==== South Korea vs. Mexico ====
South Korea
2
The Spectrum, Philadelphia, United States
August 1976
Carpet (indoors)

Mexico
1

			1	2	3
1	(South Korea) (Mexico)	Lee Duk-hee; Alina Baraldi	4; 6	6; 2	5; 7
2	(South Korea) (Mexico)	Yang Jeong-soon; Alejandra Vallejo	6; 3	6; 4
3	(South Korea) (Mexico)	Lee Duk-hee / Yang Jeong-soon; Alina Baraldi / Alejandra Vallejo	6; 4	6; 4

==== Indonesia vs. New Zealand ====
Indonesia
0
The Spectrum, Philadelphia, United States
August 1976
Carpet (indoors)

New Zealand
3

		1	2	3
1	(Indonesia) (New Zealand)
2	(Indonesia) (New Zealand)
3	(Indonesia) (New Zealand)

==== Norway vs. Spain ====
Norway
1
The Spectrum, Philadelphia, United States
August 1976
Carpet (indoors)

Spain
2

		1	2	3
1	(Norway) (Spain)
2	(Norway) (Spain)
3	(Norway) (Spain)

=== Quarterfinals ===
==== France vs. Rhodesia ====
France
3
The Spectrum, Philadelphia, United States
August 1976
Carpet (indoors)

Rhodesia
0

			1	2	3
1	(France) (Rhodesia)	Nathalie Fuchs; Jenny Waggott	6; 4	6; 0
2	(France) (Rhodesia)	Gail Benedetti; Fiona McKenzie	6; 0	6; 3
3	(France) (Rhodesia)	Rosy Darmon / Gail Benedetti; Sally-Ann Lewis / Fiona McKenzie	6; 1	6; 1

==== Brazil vs. Japan ====
Brazil
3
The Spectrum, Philadelphia, United States
August 1976
Carpet (indoors)

Japan
0

			1	2	3
1	(Brazil) (Japan)	Patricia Medrado; Naoko Sato	6; 7	6; 4	6; 0
2	(Brazil) (Japan)	Vera Lúcia Giugni; Kiyomi Nakagawa	6; 4	6; 2
3	(Brazil) (Japan)	Maria Bueno / Vera Lúcia Giugni; Kiyomi Nakagawa / Naoko Sato	6; 2	4; 6	6; 2

==== South Korea vs. New Zealand ====
South Korea
3
The Spectrum, Philadelphia, United States
August 1976
Carpet (indoors)

New Zealand
0

			1	2	3
1	(South Korea) (New Zealand)	Lee Duk-hee; Chris Newton	6; 1	2; 6	6; 2
2	(South Korea) (New Zealand)	Yang Jeong-soon; Judy Chaloner	6; 3	3; 6	6; 4
3	(South Korea) (New Zealand)	Lee Duk-hee / Helen Park; Pauline Elliott / Chris Newton	6; 3	7; 5

==== Spain vs. Romania ====
Spain
0
The Spectrum, Philadelphia, United States
August 1976
Carpet (indoors)

Romania
3

		1	2	3
1	(Spain) (Romania)
2	(Spain) (Romania)
3	(Spain) (Romania)

=== Semifinals ===
==== France vs. Brazil ====
France
2
The Spectrum, Philadelphia, United States
August 1976
Carpet (indoors)

Brazil
0

			1	2	3
1	(France) (Brazil)	Nathalie Fuchs; Vera Lúcia Giugni	6; 4	6; 0
2	(France) (Brazil)	Gail Benedetti; Patricia Medrado	6; 2	6; 2
3	(France) (Brazil)

==== South Korea vs. Romania ====
South Korea
0
The Spectrum, Philadelphia, United States
August 1976
Carpet (indoors)

Romania
3

			1	2	3
1	(South Korea) (Romania)	Lee Duk-hee; Florența Mihai	4; 6	2; 6
2	(South Korea) (Romania)	Yang Jeong-soon; Virginia Ruzici	1; 6	1; 6
3	(South Korea) (Romania)	Lee Duk-hee / Yang Jeong-soon; Florența Mihai / Virginia Ruzici	4; 6	6; 7

=== Final ===
==== France vs. Romania ====
France
0
The Spectrum, Philadelphia, United States
August 1976
Carpet (indoors)

Romania
3

			1	2	3
1	(France) (Romania)	Nathalie Fuchs; Florența Mihai	6; 7	2; 6
2	(France) (Romania)	Gail Benedetti; Virginia Ruzici	2; 6	1; 6
3	(France) (Romania)	Rosy Darmon / Gail Benedetti; Florența Mihai / Virginia Ruzici	3; 6	6; 2	1; 6
