= 1998 Fed Cup Europe/Africa Zone Group II – Pool B =

International tennis competition

Group B of the 1998 Fed Cup Europe/Africa Zone Group II was one of five pools in the Europe/Africa zone of the 1998 Fed Cup. Five teams competed in a round robin competition, with the top team advancing to Group I for 1999.

	(Finland) FIN	(North Macedonia) MKD	(Egypt) EGY	(Liechtenstein) LIE	(Botswana) BOT	Match; W–L	Set; W–L	Game; W–L	Standings
Finland		2–1	3–0	3–0	3–0	4–0	22–3	149–43	1
Macedonia	1–2		2–1	3–0	3–0	3–1	18–7	138–88	2
Egypt	0–3	1–2		2–1	2–0	2–2	11–11	90–104	3
Liechtenstein	0–3	0–3	1–2		3–0	1–3	8–18	88–132	4
Botswana	0–3	0–3	0–2	0–3		0–4	2–22	43–141	5

== Finland vs. Botswana ==
Finland
3
Ali Bey Club, Manavgat, Turkey
5 May 1998
Red clay (outdoors)

Botswana
0

			1	2	3
1	(Finland) (Botswana)	Kirsi Lampinen; Kelesitse Makgale	6; 2	6; 0
2	(Finland) (Botswana)	Hanna-Katri Aalto; Mmaphala Letsatle	6; 0	6; 0
3	(Finland) (Botswana)	Nanne Dahlman / Linda Jansson; Mmaphala Letsatle / Kelesitse Makgale	6; 0	6; 0

== Egypt vs. Liechtenstein ==
Egypt
3
Ali Bey Club, Manavgat, Turkey
5 May 1998
Red clay (outdoors)

Liechtenstein
0

			1	2	3
1	(Egypt) (Liechtenstein)	Marwa El Wany; Angelika Schädler	6; 5	6; 5
2	(Egypt) (Liechtenstein)	Dalia El Sheikh; Jeannine Niedhardt	6; 2	6; 3
3	(Egypt) (Liechtenstein)	Marwa El Wany / Dalia El Sheikh; Angelika Schädler / Sidonia Wolfinger	6; 4	5; 7	1; 6

== Finland vs. Egypt ==
Finland
3
Ali Bey Club, Manavgat, Turkey
6 May 1998
Red clay (outdoors)

Egypt
0

			1	2	3
1	(Finland) (Egypt)	Kirsi Lampinen; May Emara	6; 2	6; 2
2	(Finland) (Egypt)	Hanna-Katri Aalto; Dalia El Sheikh	6; 0	6; 1
3	(Finland) (Egypt)	Nanne Dahlman / Linda Jansson; Dalia El Sheikh / May Emara	6; 0	6; 0

== Finland vs. Liechtenstein ==
Finland
3
Ali Bey Club, Manavgat, Turkey
6 May 1998
Red clay (outdoors)

Liechtenstein
0

			1	2	3
1	(Finland) (Liechtenstein)	Kirsi Lampinen; Sidonia Wolfinger	6; 0	6; 1
2	(Finland) (Liechtenstein)	Hanna-Katri Aalto; Fabienne Gmeiner	6; 0	6; 1
3	(Finland) (Liechtenstein)	Nanne Dahlman / Linda Jansson; Angelika Schädler / Sidonia Wolfinger	6; 2	6; 1

== Macedonia vs. Liechtenstein ==
Macedonia
3
Ali Bey Club, Manavgat, Turkey
6 May 1998
Red clay (outdoors)

Liechtenstein
0

			1	2	3
1	(North Macedonia) (Liechtenstein)	Biljana Trpeska; Fabienne Gmeiner	6; 2	6; 3
2	(North Macedonia) (Liechtenstein)	Marina Lazarovska; Angelika Schädler	6; 0	6; 1
3	(North Macedonia) (Liechtenstein)	Marina Lazarovska / Biljana Trpeska; Jeannine Niedhardt / Sidonia Wolfinger	6; 4	6; 0

== Macedonia vs. Botswana ==
Macedonia
3
Ali Bey Club, Manavgat, Turkey
7 May 1998
Red clay (outdoors)

Botswana
0

			1	2	3
1	(North Macedonia) (Botswana)	Ana Buraku; Kelesitse Makgale	4; 6	6; 1	6; 3
2	(North Macedonia) (Botswana)	Marina Lazarovska; Mmaphala Letsatle	6; 1	6; 1
3	(North Macedonia) (Botswana)	Marina Lazarovska / Elena Manevska; Mmaphala Letsatle / Razalia Phethu	6; 0	6; 2

== Macedonia vs. Egypt ==
Macedonia
2
Ali Bey Club, Manavgat, Turkey
8 May 1998
Red clay (outdoors)

Egypt
1

			1	2	3
1	(North Macedonia) (Egypt)	Biljana Trpeska; Dalia El Sheikh	6; 1	7; 5
2	(North Macedonia) (Egypt)	Marina Lazarovska; Marwa El Wany	5; 0			retired
3	(North Macedonia) (Egypt)	Ana Buraku / Elena Manevska; Dalia El Sheikh / May Emara	1; 6	6; 3	6; 8

== Liechtenstein vs. Botswana ==
Liechtenstein
3
Ali Bey Club, Manavgat, Turkey
8 May 1998
Red clay (outdoors)

Botswana
0

			1	2	3
1	(Liechtenstein) (Botswana)	Fabienne Gmeiner; Kelesitse Makgale	6; 0	6; 0
2	(Liechtenstein) (Botswana)	Angelika Schädler; Mmaphala Letsatle	6; 3	6; 3
3	(Liechtenstein) (Botswana)	Fabienne Gmeiner / Jeannine Niedhardt; Mmaphala Letsatle / Kelesitse Makgale	7; 5	3; 6	7; 5

== Finland vs. Macedonia ==
Finland
2
Ali Bey Club, Manavgat, Turkey
9 May 1998
Red clay (outdoors)

Macedonia
1

			1	2	3
1	(Finland) (North Macedonia)	Kirsi Lampinen; Biljana Trpeska	6; 3	6; 2
2	(Finland) (North Macedonia)	Hanna-Katri Aalto; Marina Lazarovska	3; 6	6^{1} 7^{7}
3	(Finland) (North Macedonia)	Nanne Dahlman / Linda Jansson; Marina Lazarovska / Biljana Trpeska	1; 6	7; 5	6; 2

== Egypt vs. Botswana ==
Egypt
3
Ali Bey Club, Manavgat, Turkey
9 May 1998
Red clay (outdoors)

Botswana
0

			1	2	3
1	(Egypt) (Botswana)	May Emara; Kelesitse Makgale	6; 0	6; 0
2	(Egypt) (Botswana)	Dalia El Sheikh; Mmaphala Letsatle	6; 2	6; 3
3	(Egypt) (Botswana)	Dalia El Sheikh / May Emara; Mmaphala Letsatle / Kelesitse Makgale				not played

- Finland placed first in this group and thus advanced to Group I for 1999, where they placed last in their pool of four and was thus relegated back to Group II for 2000.

== See also ==
- Fed Cup structure
