= 1999 Fed Cup Europe/Africa Zone Group II – Pool D =

International tennis competition

Group D of the 1999 Fed Cup Europe/Africa Zone Group II was one of four pools in the Europe/Africa zone of the 1999 Fed Cup. Five teams competed in a round robin competition, with the top team advancing to Group I for 2000.

	(Turkey) TUR	(Republic of Ireland) IRL	(Malta) MLT	(Algeria) ALG	(North Macedonia) MKD	Match; W–L	Set; W–L	Game; W–L	Standings
Turkey		2–1	2–1	2–1	2–1	4–0	16–9	128–105	1
Ireland	1–2		3–0	3–0	3–0	3–1	20–6	149–103	2
Malta	1–2	0–3		3–0	3–0	2–2	16–10	129–115	3
Algeria	1–2	0–3	0–3		3–0	1–3	8–17	109–130	4
Macedonia	1–2	0–3	0–3	0–3		0–4	3–21	77–139	5

== Turkey vs. Macedonia ==
Turkey
2
La Manga Club, Murcia, Spain
26 April 1999
Red clay (outdoors)

Macedonia
1

			1	2	3
1	(Turkey) (North Macedonia)	Duygu Akşit Oal; Zdenka Videnova	6; 3	6; 2
2	(Turkey) (North Macedonia)	Gülberk Gültekin; Marina Lazarovska	2; 6	2; 6
3	(Turkey) (North Macedonia)	Duygu Akşit Oal / Gülberk Gültekin; Marina Lazarovska / Elena Manevska	6; 1	7; 5

== Ireland vs. Malta ==
Ireland
3
La Manga Club, Murcia, Spain
26 April 1999
Red clay (outdoors)

Malta
0

			1	2	3
1	(Republic of Ireland) (Malta)	Yvonne Flynn; Lisa Camenzuli	0; 6	7; 5	6; 2
2	(Republic of Ireland) (Malta)	Gina Niland; Helen Asciak	6; 4	6; 3
3	(Republic of Ireland) (Malta)	Kelly Liggan / Karen Nugent; Lisa Camenzuli / Carol Cassar-Torreggiani	6; 3	6^{1} 7^{7}	6; 4

== Ireland vs. Macedonia ==
Ireland
3
La Manga Club, Murcia, Spain
27 April 1999
Red clay (outdoors)

Macedonia
0

			1	2	3
1	(Republic of Ireland) (North Macedonia)	Gina Niland; Zdenka Videnova	6; 2	6; 3
2	(Republic of Ireland) (North Macedonia)	Kelly Liggan; Marina Lazarovska	6; 4	3; 2		retired
3	(Republic of Ireland) (North Macedonia)	Yvonne Flynn / Karen Nugent; Elena Manevska / Zdenka Videnova	6; 1	6; 2

== Malta vs. Algeria ==
Malta
3
La Manga Club, Murcia, Spain
27 April 1999
Red clay (outdoors)

Algeria
0

			1	2	3
1	(Malta) (Algeria)	Carol Cassar-Torreggiani; Feriel Esseghir	6; 4	6; 3
2	(Malta) (Algeria)	Lisa Camenzuli; Ouarda Bouchabou	6; 4	6; 4
3	(Malta) (Algeria)	Lisa Camenzuli / Carol Cassar-Torreggiani; Siham-Soumeya Ben Nacer / Feriel Esseghir	7^{14} 6^{12}	6; 4

== Turkey vs. Malta ==
Turkey
2
La Manga Club, Murcia, Spain
28 April 1999
Red clay (outdoors)

Malta
1

			1	2	3
1	(Turkey) (Malta)	Duygu Akşit Oal; Carol Cassar-Torreggiani	6; 3	6; 1
2	(Turkey) (Malta)	Gülberk Gültekin; Lisa Camenzuli	6; 4	6; 0
3	(Turkey) (Malta)	Merve Asımgil / Seden Özlü; Helen Asciak / Lisa Camenzuli	1; 6	3; 6

== Ireland vs. Algeria ==
Ireland
3
La Manga Club, Murcia, Spain
28 April 1999
Red clay (outdoors)

Algeria
0

			1	2	3
1	(Republic of Ireland) (Algeria)	Gina Niland; Djamila Khaldi	7; 5	6; 4
2	(Republic of Ireland) (Algeria)	Kelly Liggan; Siham-Soumeya Ben Nacer	6; 4	6; 2
3	(Republic of Ireland) (Algeria)	Yvonne Flynn / Karen Nugent; Siham-Soumeya Ben Nacer / Feriel Esseghir	6; 2	6; 2

== Turkey vs. Algeria ==
Turkey
2
La Manga Club, Murcia, Spain
29 April 1999
Red clay (outdoors)

Algeria
1

			1	2	3
1	(Turkey) (Algeria)	Duygu Akşit Oal; Feriel Esseghir	6; 4	5; 7	6; 1
2	(Turkey) (Algeria)	Gülberk Gültekin; Ouarda Bouchabou	6; 2	6^{8} 7^{10}	6; 2
3	(Turkey) (Algeria)	Merve Asımgil / Seden Özlü; Siham-Soumeya Ben Nacer / Feriel Esseghir	0; 3			retired

== Malta vs. Macedonia ==
Malta
3
La Manga Club, Murcia, Spain
29 April 1999
Red clay (outdoors)

Macedonia
0

			1	2	3
1	(Malta) (North Macedonia)	Lisa Camenzuli; Ana Buraku	7; 5	6; 4
2	(Malta) (North Macedonia)	Helen Asciak; Zdenka Videnova	7; 5	6; 1
3	(Malta) (North Macedonia)	Lisa Camenzuli / Carol Cassar-Torreggiani; Ana Buraku / Zdenka Videnova	6; 2	6; 2

== Turkey vs. Ireland ==
Turkey
2
La Manga Club, Murcia, Spain
30 April 1999
Red clay (outdoors)

Ireland
1

			1	2	3
1	(Turkey) (Republic of Ireland)	Duygu Akşit Oal; Gina Niland	3; 6	6; 4	8; 6
2	(Turkey) (Republic of Ireland)	Gülberk Gültekin; Kelly Liggan	6; 3	7; 5
3	(Turkey) (Republic of Ireland)	Gülberk Gültekin / Seden Özlü; Yvonne Flynn / Karen Nugent	3; 6	2; 6

== Algeria vs. Macedonia ==
Algeria
3
La Manga Club, Murcia, Spain
30 April 1999
Red clay (outdoors)

Macedonia
0

			1	2	3
1	(Algeria) (North Macedonia)	Siham-Soumeya Ben Nacer; Ana Buraku	6; 2	3; 6	6; 4
2	(Algeria) (North Macedonia)	Ouarda Bouchabou; Elena Manevska	6; 4	6; 0
3	(Algeria) (North Macedonia)	Ouarda Bouchabou / Djamila Khaldi; Ana Buraku / Elena Manevska	6; 1	6; 4

- Turkey placed first in this group and thus advanced to Group I for 2000, where they placed last in their pool of four and was thus relegated back to Group II for 2001.

== See also ==
- Fed Cup structure
