= 1966 Federation Cup (tennis) =

International women's tennis competition

Details
- Duration: 10 – 15 May
- Edition: 4th

Champion
- Winning nation: United States

The 1966 Federation Cup was the fourth edition of what is now known as the Billie Jean King Cup. 21 nations participated in the tournament, which was held at the Turin Press Sporting Club in Turin, Italy from 10 to 15 May. United States won their second title, defeating West Germany in the final, in what was the first final not featuring Australia.

== Participating teams ==
Participating Teams
| Argentina | Australia | Austria | Belgium | Bulgaria | Canada | Czechoslovakia |
| East Germany | France | Great Britain | Hungary | Italy | Morocco | Netherlands |
| Poland | Rhodesia | South Africa | Sweden | Switzerland | United States | West Germany |

== Draw ==
All ties were played at the Turin Press Sporting Club in Turin, Italy on clay courts.

First Round; 10 May
Sweden | 3
Morocco | 0
Hungary | 2
Belgium | 1
Bulgaria | 1
Canada | 2
Poland
East Germany | w/o
Rhodesia | 3
Austria | 0

Second Round; 12 May
United States | 3
Sweden | 0
France | 2
Hungary | 1
Great Britain | 3
Canada | 0
Czechoslovakia | 3
Poland | 0
Italy | 3
Rhodesia | 0
Argentina | 0
West Germany | 3
Netherlands | 2
South Africa | 1
Switzerland | 0
Australia | 3

Quarterfinals; 13 May
United States | 2
France | 1
Great Britain | 3
Czechoslovakia | 0
Italy | 1
West Germany | 2
Netherlands | 1
Australia | 2

Semifinals; 14 May
United States | 2
Great Britain | 1
West Germany | 2
Australia | 1

Final; 15 May
United States | 3
West Germany | 0

=== First round ===
Sweden vs. Morocco

Sweden
3
Turin Press Sporting Club, Turin, Italy
10 May 1966
Clay

Morocco
0

| | | | 1 | 2 | 3 |
|---|---|---|---|---|---|
| 1 | (Sweden) (Morocco) | Christina Sandberg; Jacqueline Morales | 7; 9 | 6; 3 | 6; 2 |
| 2 | (Sweden) (Morocco) | Eva Lundqvist; Françoise Repoux | 6; 2 | 6; 4 |
| 3 | (Sweden) (Morocco) | Ingrid Löfdahl / Eva Lundqvist; Jacqueline Morales / Françoise Repoux | 7; 5 | 7; 5 |

Hungary vs. Belgium

Hungary
2
Turin Press Sporting Club, Turin, Italy
10 May 1966
Clay

Belgium
1

| | | | 1 | 2 | 3 |
|---|---|---|---|---|---|
| 1 | (Hungary) (Belgium) | Klara Bardoczy; Christiane Mercelis | 3; 6 | 7; 5 | 6; 4 |
| 2 | (Hungary) (Belgium) | Erzsébet Széll; Michele Kahn | 6; 0 | 6; 3 |
| 3 | (Hungary) (Belgium) | Klara Bardóczy / Éva Szabó; Monique Bedoret / Christiane Mercelis | 6; 4 | 1; 6 | 2; 6 |

Bulgaria vs. Canada

Bulgaria
1
Turin Press Sporting Club, Turin, Italy
10 May 1966
Clay

Canada
2

| | | | 1 | 2 | 3 |
|---|---|---|---|---|---|
| 1 | (Bulgaria) (Canada) | Maria Chakarova; Vicki Berner | 6; 2 | 1; 6 | 6; 2 |
| 2 | (Bulgaria) (Canada) | Lubka Radkova; Faye Urban | 3; 6 | 0; 6 |
| 3 | (Bulgaria) (Canada) | Maria Chakarova / Lubka Radkova; Vicki Berner / Faye Urban | 1; 6 | 0; 6 |

Rhodesia vs. Austria

Rhodesia
3
Turin Press Sporting Club, Turin, Italy
10 May 1966
Clay

Austria
0

| | | | 1 | 2 | 3 |
|---|---|---|---|---|---|
| 1 | (Rhodesia) (Austria) | Patricia Walkden; Sonja Pachta | 6; 2 | 6; 4 |
| 2 | (Rhodesia) (Austria) | Joan Walker; Monika Hassmann | 11; 9 | 6; 2 |
| 3 | (Rhodesia) (Austria) | Patricia Walkden / Joan Walker; Monika Hassmann / Sonja Pachta | 6; 4 | 6; 8 | 6; 4 |

=== Second round ===
United States vs. Sweden

United States
3
Turin Press Sporting Club, Turin, Italy
12 May 1966
Clay

Sweden
0

| | | | 1 | 2 | 3 |
|---|---|---|---|---|---|
| 1 | (United States) (Sweden) | Billie Jean King; Christina Sandberg | 6; 2 | 6; 3 |
| 2 | (United States) (Sweden) | Julie Heldman; Eva Lundqvist | 6; 4 | 6; 0 |
| 3 | (United States) (Sweden) | Carole Graebner / Billie Jean King; Ingrid Löfdahl / Eva Lundqvist | 6; 3 | 6; 1 |

France vs. Hungary

France
2
Turin Press Sporting Club, Turin, Italy
12 May 1966
Clay

Hungary
1

| | | | 1 | 2 | 3 |
|---|---|---|---|---|---|
| 1 | (France) (Hungary) | Françoise Dürr; Klara Bardóczy | 6; 2 | 6; 0 |
| 2 | (France) (Hungary) | Évelyne Terras; Erzsébet Széll | 1; 6 | 1; 6 |
| 3 | (France) (Hungary) | Françoise Dürr / Janine Lieffrig; Klara Bardóczy / Erzsébet Széll | 6; 1 | 6; 0 |

Great Britain vs. Canada

Great Britain
3
Turin Press Sporting Club, Turin, Italy
12 May 1966
Clay

Canada
0

| | | | 1 | 2 | 3 |
|---|---|---|---|---|---|
| 1 | (United Kingdom) (Canada) | Ann Jones; Vicki Berner | 6; 0 | 6; 3 |
| 2 | (United Kingdom) (Canada) | Winnie Shaw; Faye Urban | 6; 2 | 6; 2 |
| 3 | (United Kingdom) (Canada) | Ann Jones / Elizabeth Starkie; Brenda Nunns / Faye Urban | 8; 6 | 6; 3 |

Czechoslovakia vs. Poland

Czechoslovakia
3
Turin Press Sporting Club, Turin, Italy
12 May 1966
Clay

Poland
0

| | | | 1 | 2 | 3 |
|---|---|---|---|---|---|
| 1 | (Czechoslovakia) (Poland) | Vlasta Vopičková; Danula Rylska | 6; 2 | 6; 1 |
| 2 | (Czechoslovakia) (Poland) | Jitka Volavková; Barbara Olszewska | 6; 1 | 6; 1 |
| 3 | (Czechoslovakia) (Poland) | Jitka Volavková / Vlasta Vopičková; Barbara Olszewska / Danula Rylska | 6; 2 | 6; 2 |

Italy vs. Rhodesia

Italy
3
Turin Press Sporting Club, Turin, Italy
12 May 1966
Clay

Rhodesia
0

| | | | 1 | 2 | 3 |
|---|---|---|---|---|---|
| 1 | (Italy) (Rhodesia) | Lea Pericoli; Patricia Walkden | 6; 2 | 4; 6 | 6; 4 |
| 2 | (Italy) (Rhodesia) | Maria Teresa Riedl; Joan Walker | 6; 1 | 6; 2 |
| 3 | (Italy) (Rhodesia) | Silvana Lazzarino / Maria Teresa Riedl; Patricia Walkden / Joan Walker | 6; 2 | 6; 3 |

Argentina vs. West Germany

Argentina
0
Turin Press Sporting Club, Turin, Italy
12 May 1966
Clay

West Germany
3

| | | | 1 | 2 | 3 |
|---|---|---|---|---|---|
| 1 | (Argentina) (West Germany) | Norma Baylon; Edda Buding | 4; 6 | 4; 6 |
| 2 | (Argentina) (West Germany) | Graciela Moran; Helga Niessen | 0; 6 | 3; 6 |
| 3 | (Argentina) (West Germany) | Raquel Giscafré / Graciela Moran; Edda Buding / Helga Hösl | 4; 6 | 1; 6 |

Netherlands vs. South Africa

Netherlands
2
Turin Press Sporting Club, Turin, Italy
12 May 1966
Clay

South Africa
1

| | | | 1 | 2 | 3 |
|---|---|---|---|---|---|
| 1 | (Netherlands) (South Africa) | Els Veentjer-Spruyt; Annette Van Zyl | 4; 6 | 2; 6 |
| 2 | (Netherlands) (South Africa) | Gertruida Groenman; Esmé Emmanuel | 6; 3 | 1; 6 | 6; 1 |
| 3 | (Netherlands) (South Africa) | Gertruida Groenman / Els Veentjer-Spruyt; Esmé Emmanuel / Annette Van Zyl | 8; 6 | 3; 6 | 6; 2 |

Switzerland vs. Australia

Switzerland
0
Turin Press Sporting Club, Turin, Italy
12 May 1966
Clay

Australia
3

| | | | 1 | 2 | 3 |
|---|---|---|---|---|---|
| 1 | (Switzerland) (Australia) | Sonja Fetz; Judy Tegart | 0; 6 | 0; 6 |
| 2 | (Switzerland) (Australia) | Anne-Marie Studer; Gail Sherriff | 1; 6 | 2; 6 |
| 3 | (Switzerland) (Australia) | Janine Bourgnon / Sonja Fetz; Karen Krantzcke / Judy Tegart | 0; 6 | 2; 6 |

=== Quarterfinals ===
United States vs. France

United States
2
Turin Press Sporting Club, Turin, Italy
13 May 1966
Clay

France
1

| | | | 1 | 2 | 3 |
|---|---|---|---|---|---|
| 1 | (United States) (France) | Julie Heldman; Janine Lieffrig | 6; 0 | 6; 4 |
| 2 | (United States) (France) | Billie Jean King; Françoise Dürr | 5; 7 | 6; 2 | 6; 3 |
| 3 | (United States) (France) | Carole Graebner / Billie Jean King; Françoise Dürr / Janine Lieffrig | 2; 6 | 6; 2 | 3; 6 |

Great Britain vs. Czechoslovakia

Great Britain
3
Turin Press Sporting Club, Turin, Italy
13 May 1966
Clay

Czechoslovakia
0

| | | | 1 | 2 | 3 |
|---|---|---|---|---|---|
| 1 | (United Kingdom) (Czechoslovakia) | Winnie Shaw; Jitka Volavková | 6; 4 | 7; 9 | 6; 4 |
| 2 | (United Kingdom) (Czechoslovakia) | Ann Jones; Vlasta Vopičková | 4; 6 | 6; 2 | 6; 1 |
| 3 | (United Kingdom) (Czechoslovakia) | Ann Jones / Elizabeth Starkie; Jitka Volavková / Vlasta Vopičková | 6; 3 | 6; 4 |

Italy vs. West Germany

Italy
1
Turin Press Sporting Club, Turin, Italy
13 May 1966
Clay

West Germany
2

| | | | 1 | 2 | 3 |
|---|---|---|---|---|---|
| 1 | (Italy) (West Germany) | Maria Teresa Riedl; Helga Niessen | 3; 6 | 4; 6 |
| 2 | (Italy) (West Germany) | Lea Pericoli; Edda Buding | 6; 4 | 3; 6 | 5; 7 |
| 3 | (Italy) (West Germany) | Silvana Lazzarino / Lea Pericoli; Helga Niessen / Helga Hösl | 8; 6 | 7; 5 |

Netherlands vs. Australia

Netherlands
1
Turin Press Sporting Club, Turin, Italy
13 May 1966
Clay

Australia
2

| | | | 1 | 2 | 3 |
|---|---|---|---|---|---|
| 1 | (Netherlands) (Australia) | Betty Stöve; Gail Sherriff | 6; 2 | 6; 4 |
| 2 | (Netherlands) (Australia) | Els Veentjer-Spruyt; Judy Tegart | 0; 6 | 0; 6 |
| 3 | (Netherlands) (Australia) | Gertruida Groenman / Betty Stöve; Karen Krantzcke / Judy Tegart | 1; 6 | 6; 8 |

=== Semifinals ===
United States vs. Great Britain

United States
2
Turin Press Sporting Club, Turin, Italy
14 May 1966
Clay

Great Britain
1

| | | | 1 | 2 | 3 |
|---|---|---|---|---|---|
| 1 | (United States) (United Kingdom) | Julie Heldman; Winnie Shaw | 6; 4 | 5; 7 | 6; 3 |
| 2 | (United States) (United Kingdom) | Billie Jean King; Ann Jones | 1; 6 | 4; 6 |
| 3 | (United States) (United Kingdom) | Carole Graebner / Billie Jean King; Ann Jones / Elizabeth Starkie | 4; 6 | 6; 3 | 6; 0 |

West Germany v Australia

West Germany
2
Turin Press Sporting Club, Turin, Italy
14 May 1966
Clay

Australia
1

| | | | 1 | 2 | 3 |
|---|---|---|---|---|---|
| 1 | (West Germany) (Australia) | Edda Buding; Judy Tegart | 8; 10 | 6; 4 | 6; 2 |
| 2 | (West Germany) (Australia) | Helga Niessen; Karen Krantzcke | 6; 3 | 6; 3 |
| 3 | (West Germany) (Australia) | Edda Buding / Helga Hösl; Karen Krantzcke / Judy Tegart | 6; 2 | 2; 6 | 0; 6 |

=== Final ===
United States vs. West Germany

United States
3
Turin Press Sporting Club, Turin, Italy
15 May 1966
Clay

West Germany
0

| | | | 1 | 2 | 3 |
|---|---|---|---|---|---|
| 1 | (United States) (West Germany) | Julie Heldman; Helga Niessen | 4; 6 | 7; 5 | 6; 1 |
| 2 | (United States) (West Germany) | Billie Jean King; Edda Buding | 6; 3 | 3; 6 | 6; 1 |
| 3 | (United States) (West Germany) | Carole Graebner / Billie Jean King; Edda Buding / Helga Hösl | 6; 4 | 6; 2 |
