= Susan Stone (tennis) =

Canadian former professional tennis player (born 1950)

- Country (sports): Canada
- Born: January 31, 1950 (age 75) Vancouver, British Columbia, Canada

Singles
- Career record: 1–1 (Federation Cup)

Doubles
- Career record: 0–1 (Federation Cup)

Susan Stone (née Eager; born 31 January 1950) is a Canadian former professional tennis player.

Born in Vancouver, British Columbia, Stone was active on the international circuit in the 1970s. While competing on the WTA Tour she played in the quarter-finals of the 1973 Canadiana Open, losing to Martina Navratilova. She represented the Canada Federation Cup team in 1975 and 1976, for World Group ties against Japan and Switzerland.

== See also ==
- List of Canada Fed Cup team representatives
