= United States Billie Jean King Cup team =

American women's tennis team

United States
- Captain: Lindsay Davenport
- Nations Ranking: 5 (November 16, 2024)
- Colors: red & white & blue
- First year: 1963
- Years played: 61
- Ties played (W–L): 207 (163–44)
- Years in World Group: 38 (85–25)
- Titles: 18 (1963, 1966, 1967, 1969, 1976, 1977, 1978, 1979, 1980, 1981, 1982, 1986, 1989, 1990, 1996, 1999, 2000, 2017)
- Runners-up: 13 (1964, 1965, 1974, 1985, 1987, 1991, 1994, 1995, 2003, 2009, 2010, 2018, 2025)
- Most total wins: Chris Evert (57–4)
- Most singles wins: Chris Evert (40–2)
- Most doubles wins: Billie Jean King (26–1); Rosie Casals (26–1)
- Best doubles team: Rosie Casals / Billie Jean King (10–0); Rosie Casals / Kathy Jordan (10–0); Gigi Fernández / Zina Garrison (10–1)
- Most ties played: Chris Evert (42)
- Most years played: Lindsay Davenport (11)

The United States women's national tennis team is the most successful national team in Billie Jean King Cup competition. The team has won 18 titles and finished second a further 12 times, out of 60 participations.

== History ==
The United States won the inaugural Billie Jean King Cup, originally known as the Federation Cup and later as the Fed Cup, in 1963. They hold the record for most ties won, with 149, including 37 in a row. They won seven straight titles between 1976 and 1982.

=== Members of the inaugural team ===
- Darlene Hard
- Carole Graebner
- Billie Jean King
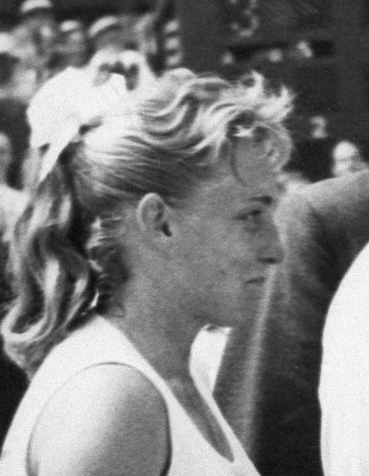
Darlene Hard

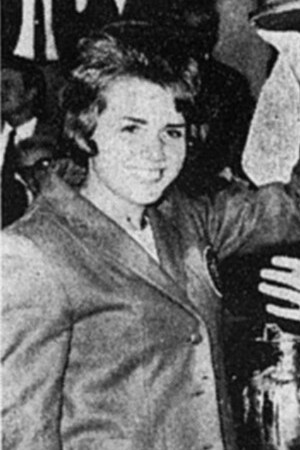
Carole Caldwell-Graebner

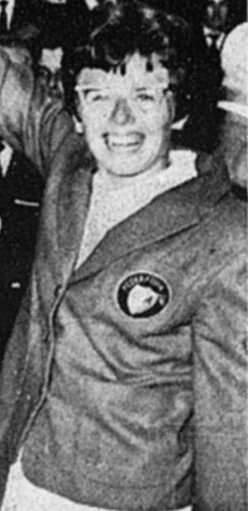
Billie Jean King

== Teams ==
- Since 1963.

Champions Runners-up

Year	Team									
1963	Billie Jean King	Carole Caldwell Graebner	Darlene Hard							
1964	Billie Jean King	Nancy Richey	Karen Susman							
1965	Billie Jean King	Carole Caldwell Graebner								
1966	Billie Jean King	Carole Caldwell Graebner	Julie Heldman							
1967	Billie Jean King	Rosie Casals								
1968										
1969	Nancy Richey	Julie Heldman	Peaches Bartkowicz							
1970										
1971										
1972										
1973										
1974	Julie Heldman	Jeanne Evert	Sharon Walsh							
1975										
1976	Rosie Casals	Billie Jean King								
1977	Chris Evert	Rosie Casals	Billie Jean King							
1978	Chris Evert	Tracy Austin	Billie Jean King							
1979	Rosie Casals	Tracy Austin	Chris Evert Lloyd	Billie Jean King						
1980	Rosie Casals	Tracy Austin	Kathy Jordan	Chris Evert Lloyd						
1981	Rosie Casals	Kathy Jordan	Andrea Jaeger	Chris Evert Lloyd						
1982	Martina Navratilova	Chris Evert Lloyd	Andrea Leand							
1983	Candy Reynolds	Andrea Jaeger								
1984	Anne Smith	Kathy Jordan	Kathy Horvath							
1985	Sharon Walsh	Elise Burgin	Kathy Jordan							
1986	Martina Navratilova	Pam Shriver	Chris Evert Lloyd							
1987	Pam Shriver	Chris Evert								
1988	Lori McNeil	Patty Fendick	Gigi Fernández							
1989	Martina Navratilova	Pam Shriver	Chris Evert	Zina Garrison						
1990	Jennifer Capriati	Zina Garrison	Gigi Fernández							
1991	Jennifer Capriati	Zina Garrison								
1992	Lori McNeil	Pam Shriver	Zina Garrison	Debbie Graham						
1993	Lori McNeil	Lindsay Davenport	Debbie Graham	Ann Grossman						
1994	Lindsay Davenport	Zina Garrison	Mary Joe Fernandez	Gigi Fernández						
1995	Martina Navratilova	Mary Joe Fernandez	Gigi Fernández	Amy Frazier						
1996	Jennifer Capriati	Mary Joe Fernandez	Gigi Fernández							
1997	Kimberly Po	Chanda Rubin	Mary Joe Fernandez	Gigi Fernández						
1998	Lisa Raymond	Lindsay Davenport	Mary Joe Fernandez	Monica Seles						
1999	Chanda Rubin	Monica Seles								
2000	Lindsay Davenport	Jennifer Capriati	Monica Seles	Lisa Raymond						
2002	Jennifer Capriati	Monica Seles	Meghann Shaughnessy	Lisa Raymond						
2003	Serena Williams	Venus Williams	Meghann Shaughnessy	Alexandra Stevenson						
2004	Laura Granville	Venus Williams	Martina Navratilova	Lisa Raymond						
2005	Serena Williams	Venus Williams	Lindsay Davenport	Corina Morariu						
2006	Jill Craybas	Jamea Jackson	Shenay Perry	Vania King						
2007	Serena Williams	Venus Williams	Lisa Raymond	Vania King						
2008	Lindsay Davenport	Laura Granville	Ashley Harkleroad	Lisa Raymond						
2009	Melanie Oudin	Alexa Glatch	Liezel Huber	Vania King						
2010	Bethanie Mattek-Sands	Melanie Oudin	Liezel Huber	Christina McHale						
2011	Christina McHale	Melanie Oudin	Liezel Huber	Vania King						
2012	Serena Williams	Venus Williams	Liezel Huber	Christina McHale						
2013	Jamie Hampton	Varvara Lepchenko	Liezel Huber							
2014	Christina McHale	Alison Riske	Madison Keys	Lauren Davis						
2015	Lauren Davis	Christina McHale	Alison Riske	Taylor Townsend	Coco Vandeweghe	Serena Williams	Venus Williams			
2016	Madison Keys	Bethanie Mattek-Sands	Christina McHale	Sloane Stephens	Coco Vandeweghe	Venus Williams				
2017	Lauren Davis	Bethanie Mattek-Sands	Alison Riske	Shelby Rogers	Sloane Stephens	Coco Vandeweghe				
2018	Serena Williams	Venus Williams	Coco Vandeweghe	Lauren Davis	Sloane Stephens	Madison Keys	Bethanie Mattek-Sands			
2019	Danielle Collins	Sofia Kenin	Alison Riske	Nicole Melichar						
2020–21	Serena Williams	Sofia Kenin	Alison Riske	Coco Gauff	Bethanie Mattek-Sands	Danielle Collins	Shelby Rogers	Sloane Stephens	Caroline Dolehide	Coco Vandeweghe
2023	Coco Gauff	Jessica Pegula	Caty McNally	Danielle Collins	Sofia Kenin	Sloane Stephens	Taylor Townsend	Madison Keys	Peyton Stearns	
2024	Jessica Pegula	Emma Navarro	Madison Keys	Taylor Townsend	Caroline Dolehide	Danielle Collins	Peyton Stearns	Ashlyn Krueger		
2025	Jessica Pegula	Emma Navarro	Hailey Baptiste	Taylor Townsend	McCartney Kessler	Lindsay Davenport (c)				
2026	Iva Jovic	Hailey Baptiste	Mccartney Kessler	Caty McNally	Nicole Melichar	Lindsay Davenport (c)				

== Current team (2026) ==
- Iva Jovic
- Hailey Baptiste
- Mccartney Kessler
- Caty McNally
- Nicole Melichar
- Lindsay Davenport (c)
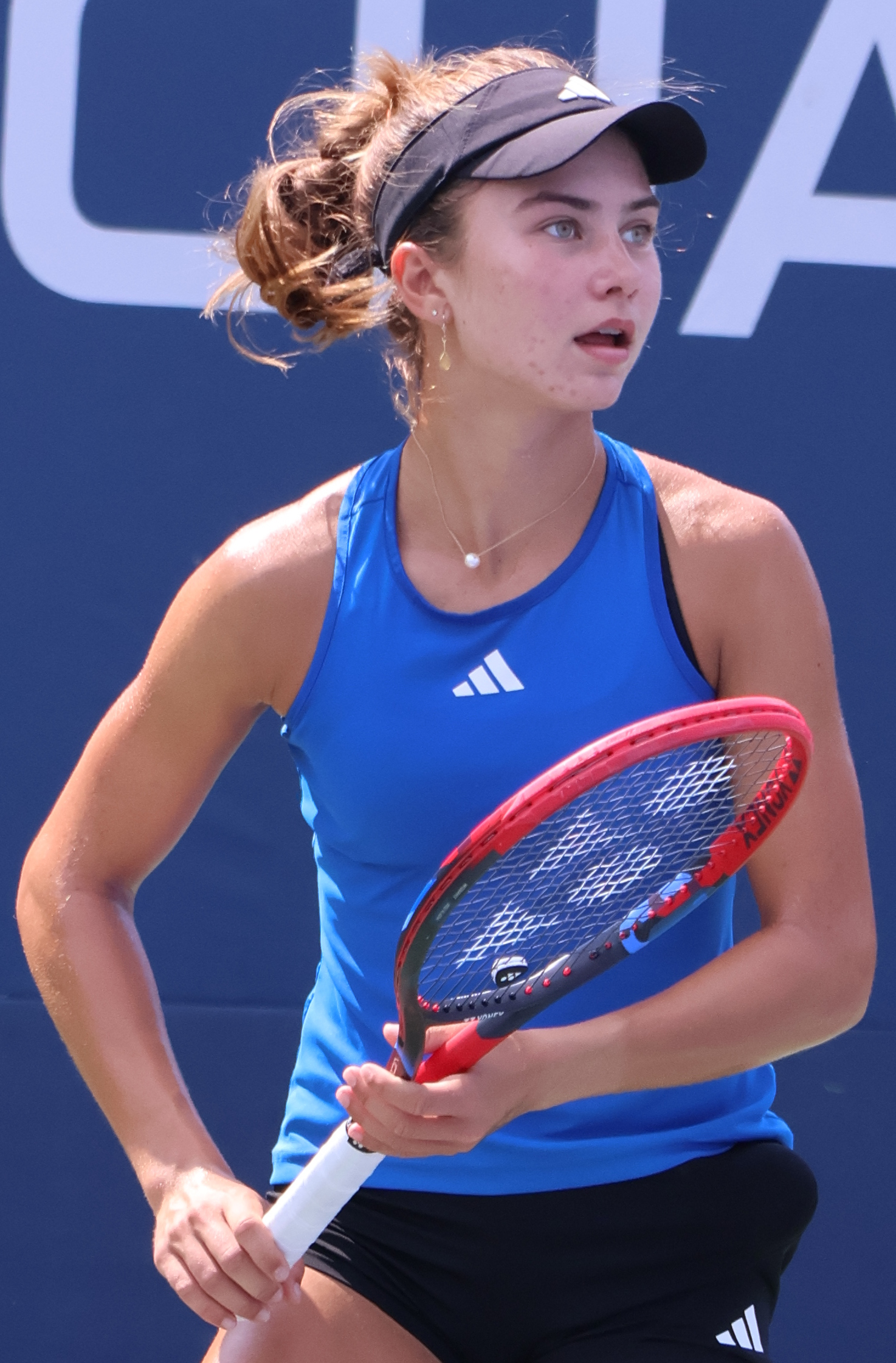
Iva Jovic

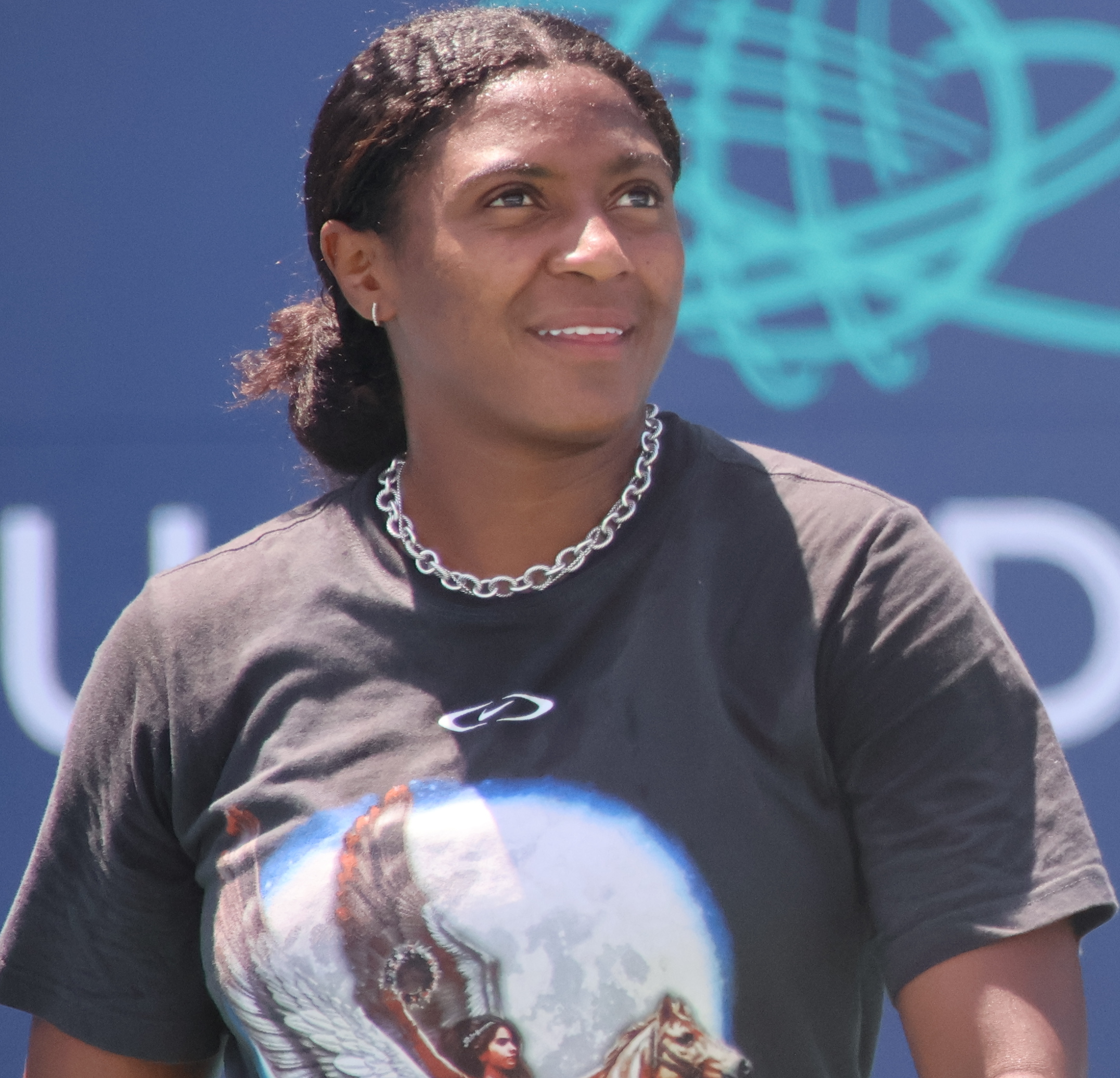
Hailey Baptiste

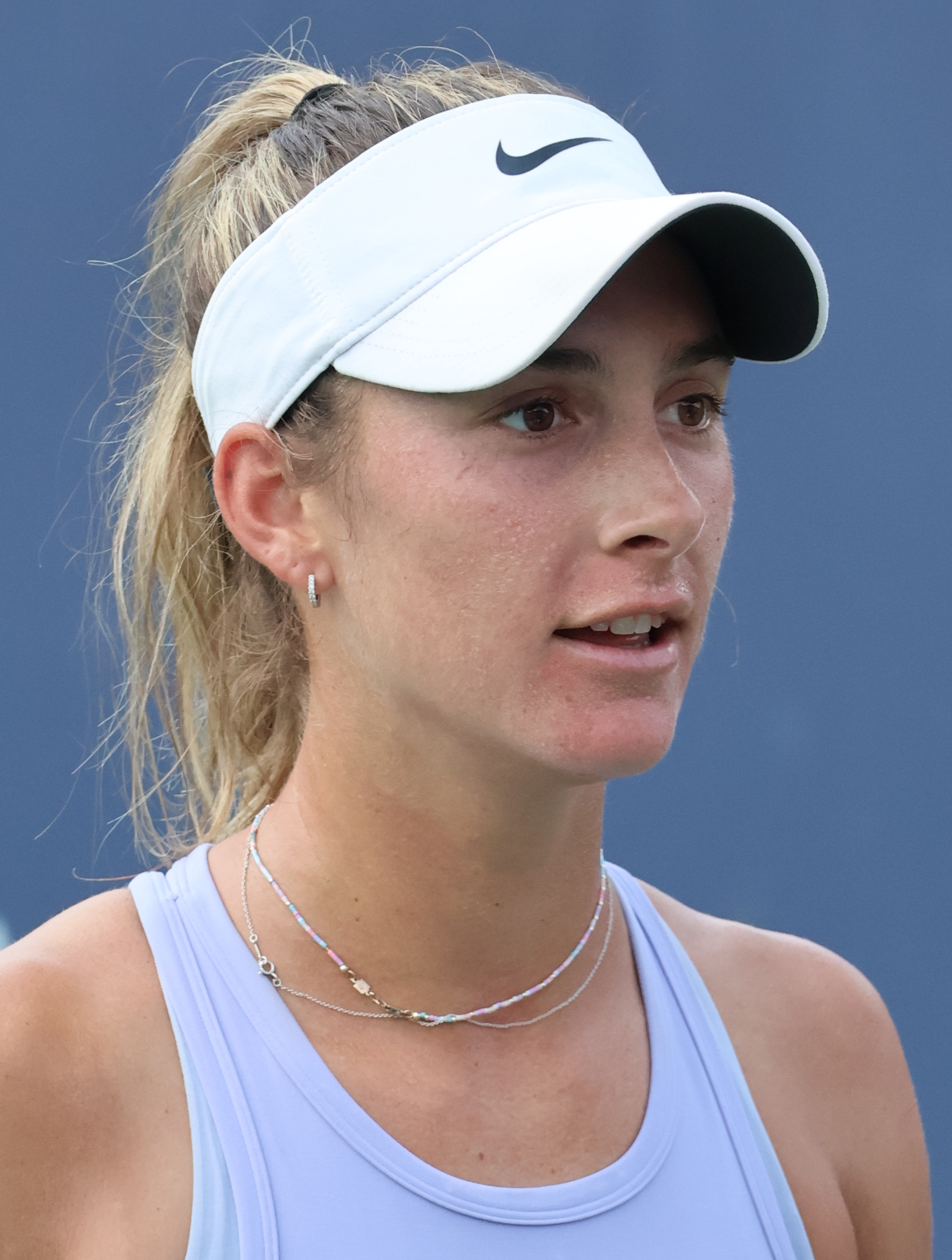
McCartney Kessler

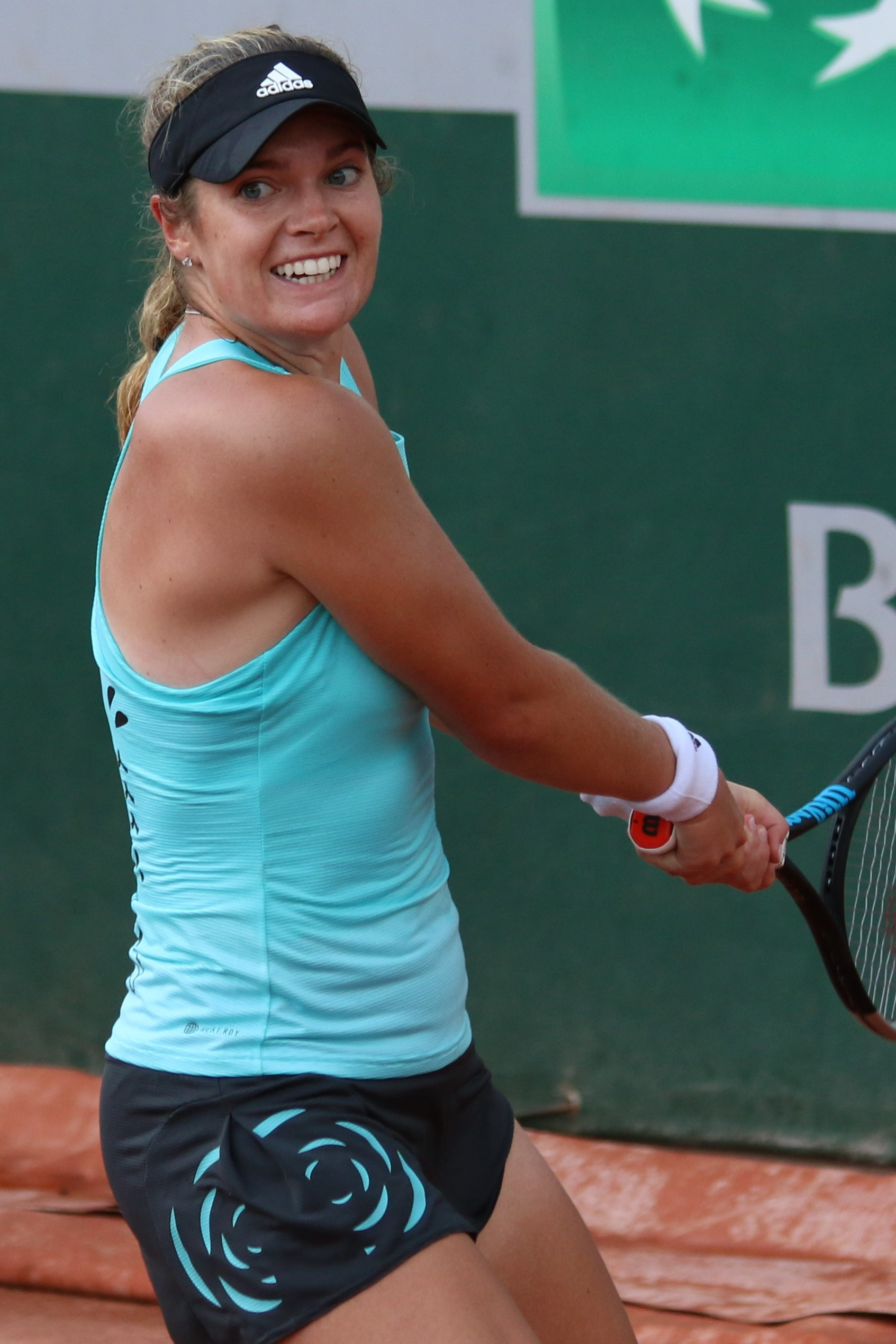
Caty McNally

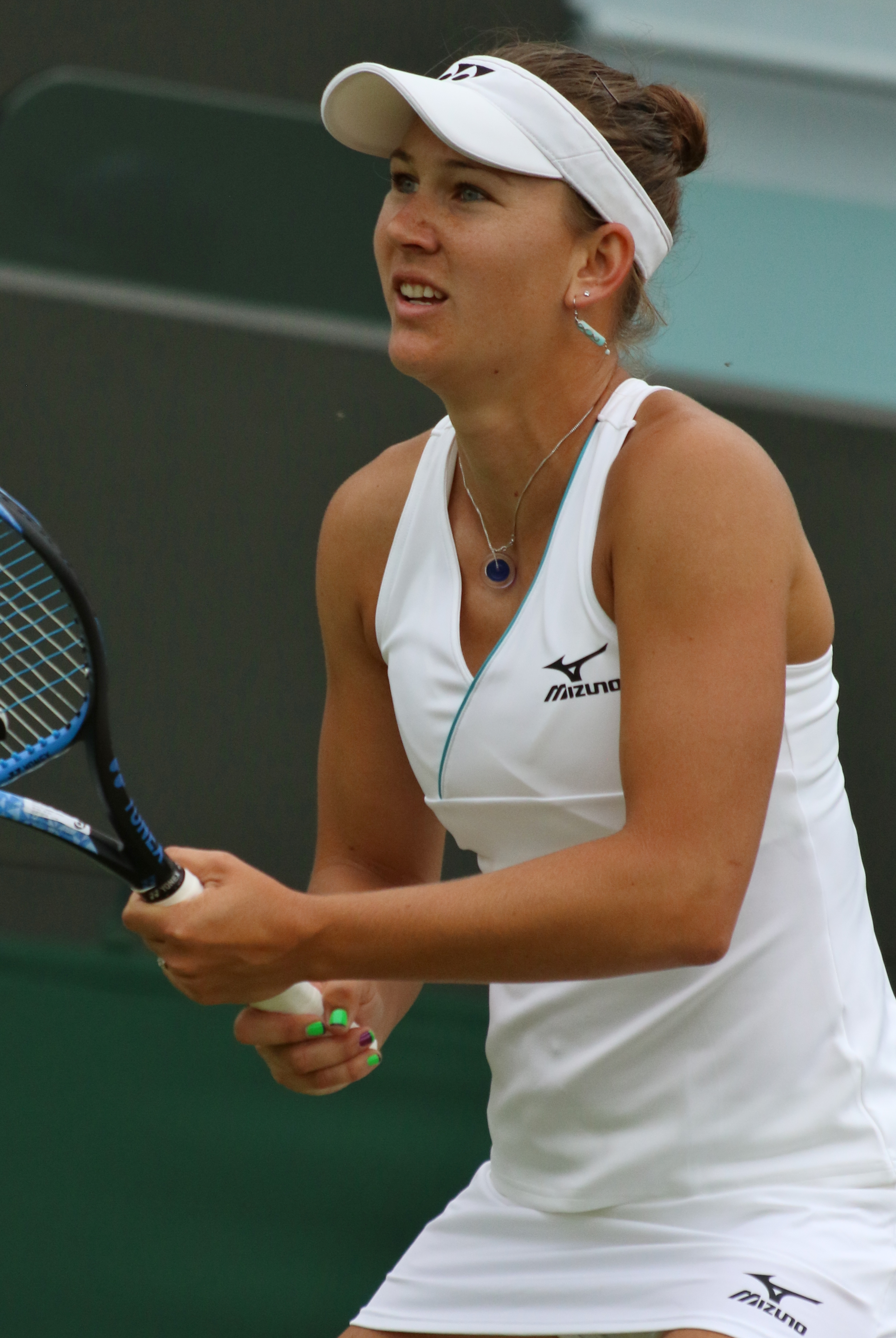
Nicole Melichar

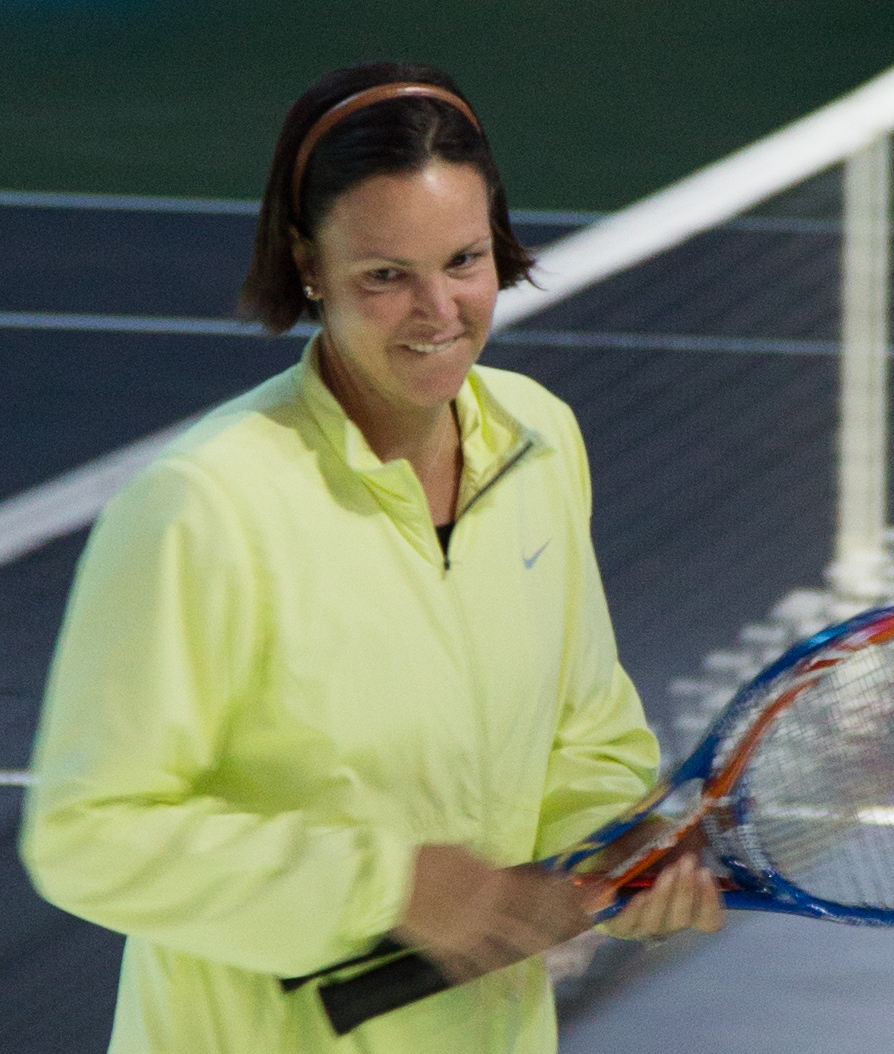
Lindsay Davenport

== Junior Billie Jean King Cup ==
The United States has won the Junior Billie Jean King Cup ten times as of 2025.

=== Final results ===
Year	Competition round	Host city	Opponent	Score	Result
1987	Semifinals	(West Germany) Freiburg im Breisgau	West Germany	1–2	Fourth place
1992	Semifinals	(Spain) Castelldefels	Czechoslovakia	2–1	Third place
1993	Final	(New Zealand) Wellington	Australia	1–2	Runner-up
1994	Semifinals	(United States) Tucson	Italy	2–0	Third place
1996	Semifinals	(Switzerland) Zürich	Slovakia	1–2	Fourth place
1999	Semifinals	(Australia) Perth	Czech Republic	2–1	Third place
2000	Semifinals	(Japan) Hiroshima	Russia	1–2	Fourth place
2008	Final	(Mexico) San Luis Potosí	Great Britain	2–0	Champion
2010	Semifinals	(Mexico) San Luis Potosí	Ukraine	0–2	Fourth place
2012	Final	(Spain) Barcelona	Russia	3–0	Champion
2013	Semifinals	(Mexico) San Luis Potosí	Hungary	2–0	Third place
2014	Final	(Mexico) San Luis Potosí	Slovakia	3–0	Champion
2015	Final	(Spain) Madrid	Czech Republic	1–2	Runner-up
2016	Final	(Hungary) Budapest	Poland	1–2	Runner-up
2017	Final	(Hungary) Budapest	Japan	2–0	Champion
2018	Final	(Hungary) Budapest	Ukraine	2–1	Champion
2019	Final	(United States) Orlando	Czech Republic	2–1	Champion
2022	Final	(Turkey) Antalya	Czech Republic	3–0	Champion
2023	Final	(Spain) Córdoba	Czech Republic	2–0	Champion
2024	Final	(Turkey) Antalya	Romania	2–1	Champion
2025	Final	(Chile) Santiago	France	2–0	Champion
2026	Quarterfinals	(Egypt) Cairo	Romania	2–1	5th place

== See also ==
- Billie Jean King Cup
- United States Davis Cup team
- United States at the Hopman Cup
- United States Tennis Association
