= Julia Muir =

Zimbabwean tennis player

- Full name: Julia Corinne Muir
- Country (sports): Zimbabwe
- Born: 16 November 1970 (age 56)
- Height: 167 cm (5 ft 6 in)

Singles
- Highest ranking: No. 693 (24 Aug 1992)

Doubles
- Career titles: 1 ITF
- Highest ranking: No. 516 (24 Aug 1992)
Medal record
All-Africa Games
Gold medal – first place	1991 Cairo	Doubles
Bronze medal – third place	1991 Cairo	Singles

Julia Corinne Muir (born 16 November 1970) is a Zimbabwean former professional tennis player. A two-time Olympian, she immigrated to New Zealand and is now known by her married name Julia Sim.

Muir, a Federation Cup debutant in 1987, represented Zimbabwe at the 1988 Summer Olympics in Seoul, at the age of 17. She entered the singles draw and received a first round bye, before losing her only match of the games to 12th seed Sylvia Hanika of West Germany.

In 1991 she was a doubles champion at the All-Africa Games in Cairo with Paula Iversen and was a joint bronze medalist in the singles event, won by Senegal's Myriam Berthé.

At the Barcelona Olympics in 1992, Muir made her second Olympics appearance, this time in doubles. She and her partner Sally McDonald fell in the first round, to the South African pairing of Mariaan de Swardt and Elna Reinach.

In 1995 she returned to the Zimbabwe Fed Cup team after a seven-year absence and finished her Fed Cup career the following year, having won four singles and four doubles rubbers from 11 ties.

Based in Auckland, Muir coaches at the Bucklands Beach Tennis Club, where she was the first ever coach of Cameron Norrie and had him change from being a right-handed to a left-handed player.

== ITF finals ==
=== Singles: 1 (0–1) ===
Outcome	No.	Date	Tournament	Surface	Opponent	Score
Runner-up	1.	29 March 1992	Harare, Zimbabwe	Hard	(United Kingdom) Julie Pullin	1–6, 1–6

=== Doubles: 1 (1–0) ===
Outcome	No.	Date	Tournament	Surface	Partner	Opponents	Score
Winner	1.	29 March 1992	Harare, Zimbabwe	Hard	(Zimbabwe) Sally McDonald	(South Africa) Liezel Horn (United Kingdom) Jennie McMahon	2–6, 6–4, 7–5
