= Helen Laupa =

Estonian tennis player

- Country (sports): Estonia
- Born: 31 August 1976 (age 49)
- Prize money: $6,048

Singles
- Career record: 13–31
- Career titles: 0
- Highest ranking: No. 577 (26 January 1998)

Doubles
- Career record: 22–40
- Career titles: 0
- Highest ranking: No. 403 (23 December 1996)

Team competitions
- Fed Cup: 8–9

Helen Laupa (born 31 August 1976) is an Estonian former professional tennis player.

Laupa has career-high WTA rankings of 577 in singles, achieved on 26 January 1998, and 403 in doubles, set on 23 December 1996. Playing for the Estonia Fed Cup team, Laupa has a win/loss record of 8–9.

== ITF Circuit finals ==
$10,000 tournaments

=== Doubles: 3 (0–3) ===
Outcome	No.	Date	Tournament	Surface	Partner	Opponents	Score
Runner-up	1.	5 February 1996	Sunderland, United Kingdom	Hard	(Australia) Melissa Beadman	(United Kingdom) Julie Pullin (United Kingdom) Lorna Woodroffe	4–6, 5–7
Runner-up	2.	27 October 1997	Minsk, Belarus	Carpet (i)	(Latvia) Elena Krutko	(Belarus) Antonina Grib (Belarus) Marina Stets	2–6, 1–6
Runner-up	3.	21 June 1998	Tallinn, Estonia	Hard	(Estonia) Maret Ani	(Czech Republic) Helena Fremuthová (Russia) Irina Kornienko	3–6, 2–6
