= Zimbabwe Billie Jean King Cup team =

Zimbabwe
- First year: 1966
- Years played: 12
- Ties played (W–L): 35 (10–25)
- Years in World Group: 7 (2–7)
- Best finish: Round of 16 (1966, 1967)
- Most total wins: Paula Iversen (11–17)
- Most singles wins: Julia Muir (4–9); Paula Iversen (4–7)
- Most doubles wins: Paula Iversen (7–8)
- Best doubles team: Paula Iversen / Julia Muir (4–5)
- Most ties played: Paula Iversen (15)
- Most years played: Paula Iversen (4)

The Zimbabwe Fed Cup team represents Zimbabwe in Fed Cup tennis competition and are governed by Tennis Zimbabwe. They have not competed since 2008.

== History ==
Zimbabwe competed in its first Fed Cup in 1966, as Rhodesia. In the opening match, they defeated Austria in a clean sweep (3-0) with Patricia Walkden recording the first victory for the team. In the second round, they would lose to Italy by the same margin to record their best result of the round of 16. After losing to the United States in 1967 and 1972 (they entered 1971 but withdrew), they entered the consolation round and they would knock over Norway in the first round of consolation before losing to Japan in the doubles rubber to be knocked out.

After they withdrew again in 1975, they entered the 1976 edition hoping for a better display.

== Players ==
Name	Years	First	Ties	Win/Loss		
Name	Years	First	Ties	Singles	Doubles	Total
Denise Atzinger	1	2008	4	0–2	0–3	0–5
Lesley Barbour	1	1987	1	–	1–0	1–0
Valeria Bhunu	1	2021	3	3–0	1–1	4–1
Sally-Anne Birch	2	1984	2	0–2	0–1	0–3
Cara Black	3	1993	8	3–5	2–3	5–8
Sally Hudson-Beck	1	1972	3	2–1	0–1	2–2
Paula Iversen	4	1987	15	4–9	7–8	11–17
Sally-Ann Lewis	1	1976	1	–	0–1	0–1
Stacey Lock	1	2008	4	0–3	0–2	0–5
Angela Longo	2	1983	5	0–5	1–3	1–8
Fiona Martin	1	1983	1	0–1	–	0–1
Tadiwanashe Eunice Mauchi	1	2021	5	1–3	3–2	4–5
Fiona McKenzie	1	1976	2	0–2	0–2	0–4
Tanyaradzwa Midzi	1	2021	4	2–1	2–1	4–2
Diana Mills	1	1994	2	0–2	–	0–2
Fiona Morris	1	1967	1	0–1	0–1	0–2
Julia Muir	3	1987	11	4–7	4–5	8–12
Daphne Pattison	1	1972	3	1–2	1–2	2–4
Sue Roux	1	1984	1	–	0–1	0–1
Lindsay Standen	2	1983	4	1–1	1–3	2–4
Charlene Tsangamwe	1	2008	4	0–3	0–3	0–6
Alison Vaughan	1	1995	1	1–0	1–0	2–0
Jennifer Waggott	2	1972	4	1–1	1–2	2–3
Nicole Wagstaff	2	1993	5	0–1	1–4	1–5
Patricia Walkden	2	1966	3	1–2	1–2	2–4
Joan Walker	1	1966	2	1–1	1–1	2–2

== See also ==
- Billie Jean King Cup
- Zimbabwe Davis Cup team
- Zimbabwe at the Hopman Cup
