= Paula Iversen =

Zimbabwean tennis player

- Country (sports): Zimbabwe
- Residence: Harare, Zimbabwe
- Born: 17 February 1970 (age 55); Salisbury, Rhodesia
- Retired: 1997
- Plays: Right-handed (two-handed backhand)
- Prize money: $3,982

Singles
- Career record: 1-2

Doubles
- Career record: 26-16
- Career titles: 3 ITF
- Highest ranking: No. 217 (31 January 1994)
- Last updated on: 11 November 2017.

Paula Iversen (born 17 February 1970) is a former female tennis player from Zimbabwe.

Iversen has a career high WTA doubles ranking of 217 achieved on 31 January 1994. Iversen has won 3 ITF doubles titles.

Iversen made her WTA main draw debut at the 1994 Japan Open Tennis Championships in the doubles event partnering Hiromi Nagano.

Playing for Zimbabwe at the Fed Cup, Iversen has accumulated a win–loss record of 11–17. Iversen retirement from professional tennis in 1997.

== ITF finals ==
=== Doubles (3–1) ===
Legend
$100,000 tournaments
$75,000/$80,000 tournaments
$50,000/$60,000 tournaments
$25,000 tournaments
$15,000 tournaments
$10,000/$15,000 tournaments

Result	No.	Date	Tournament	Surface	Partner	Opponents	Score
Win	1.	22 March 1993	Harare, Zimbabwe	Hard	(United States) Claire Sessions Bailey	(South Africa) Michelle Anderson (South Africa) Kim Grant	6–1, 6–3
Win	2.	12 April 1993	Gaborone, Botswana	Hard	(United States) Claire Sessions Bailey	(United States) Erica Adams (United States) Kelly Story	5–7, 6–1, 7–5
Win	3.	26 April 1993	Lee-on-Solent, United Kingdom	Hard	(United Kingdom) Michele Mair	(United Kingdom) Colette Hall (United Kingdom) Valda Lake	6–2, 6–4
Loss	4.	18 July 1994	Telford, United Kingdom	Hard	(Namibia) Elizma Nortje	(United Kingdom) Alison Smith (United Kingdom) Sara Tse	6–4, 4–6, 4–6
