= 1999 Fed Cup Europe/Africa Zone =

Subsection of tennis competition

The Europe/Africa Zone was one of three zones of regional competition in the 1999 Fed Cup.

== Group I ==
- Venue: La Manga Club, Murcia, Spain (outdoor clay)
- Date: 19–23 April

The sixteen teams were divided into four pools of four teams. The top two teams of each pool play-off in a two-round knockout stage to decide which nations progress to World Group II Play-offs. The four nations coming last in the pools were relegated down to Group II for 2000.

=== Pools ===
	Pool A	RSA	UKR	LAT	DEN
1	South Africa (3–0)		3–0	3–0	3–0
2	Ukraine (2–1)	0–3		2–1	2–1
3	Latvia (1–2)	0–3	1–2		2–1
4	Denmark (0–3)	0–3	1–2	1–2	

	Pool B	ROU	SWE	GRE	POR
1	Romania (3–0)		3–0	3–0	3–0
2	Sweden (2–1)	0–3		3–0	3–0
3	Greece (1–2)	0–3	0–3		2–1
4	Portugal (0–3)	0–3	0–3	1–2	

	Pool C	GBR	BUL	FIN	YUG
1	Great Britain (3–0)		2–1	3–0	3–0
2	Bulgaria (2–1)	1–2		3–0	3–0
3	Finland (1–2)	0–3	0–3		2–1
4	Yugoslavia (0–3)	0–3	0–3	1–2	

	Pool D	SLO	LUX	POL	GEO
1	Slovenia (3–0)		2–1	2–1	2–1
2	Luxembourg (2–1)	1–2		3–0	2–1
3	Poland (1–2)	1–2	0–3		3–0
4	Georgia (0–3)	1–2	1–2	0–3	

=== Knockout stage ===
Semifinals
South Africa	2
Sweden	0
Bulgaria	1
Slovenia	2
Romania	2
Ukraine	0
Luxembourg	0
Great Britain	3

Finals
South Africa	1
Slovenia	2
Romania	2
Great Britain	0

- Slovenia and Romania advanced to World Group II Play-offs.
- Denmark, Portugal, Yugoslavia and Georgia relegated to Group II in 2000.

== Group II ==
- Venue: La Manga Club, Murcia, Spain (outdoor clay)
- Date: 26–30 April

The twenty teams were randomly divided into four pools of five teams to compete in round-robin competitions. The teams that finished first in the pools would progress to Group I for 2000.

=== Pools ===
	Pool A	HUN	BIH	MAD	EGY	BOT
1	Hungary (4–0)		3–0	3–0	3–0	3–0
2	Bosnia and Herzegovina (3–1)	0–3		3–0	3–0	3–0
3	Madagascar (2–2)	0–3	0–3		2–1	2–1
4	Egypt (1–3)	0–3	0–3	1–2		3–0
5	Botswana (0–4)	0–3	0–3	1–2	0–3	

	Pool B	ISR	MDA	TUN	ARM	ISL
1	Israel (4–0)		3–0	2–0	3–0	3–0
2	Moldova (3–1)	0–3		2–1	3–0	3–0
3	Tunisia (2–2)	0–2	1–2		3–0	3–0
4	Armenia (1–3)	0–3	0–3	0–3		3–0
5	Iceland (0–4)	0–3	0–3	0–3	0–3	

	Pool C	MAR	EST	LIT	CYP	KEN
1	Morocco (4–0)		2–1	3–0	3–0	3–0
2	Estonia (3–1)	1–2		3–0	3–0	3–0
3	Lithuania (2–2)	0–3	0–3		3–0	3–0
4	Cyprus (1–3)	0–3	0–3	0–3		3–0
5	Kenya (0–4)	0–3	0–3	0–3	0–3	

	Pool D	TUR	IRL	MLT	ALG	MKD
1	Turkey (4–0)		2–1	2–1	2–1	2–1
2	Ireland (3–1)	1–2		3–0	3–0	3–0
3	Malta (2–2)	1–2	0–3		3–0	3–0
4	Algeria (1–3)	1–2	0–3	0–3		3–0
5	Macedonia (0–4)	1–2	0–3	0–3	0–3	

- Hungary, Israel, Morocco and Turkey advanced to Group I in 2000.

== See also ==
- Fed Cup structure
