= 1998 Fed Cup Europe/Africa Zone =

Subsection of tennis competition

The Europe/Africa Zone was one of three zones of regional competition in the 1998 Fed Cup.

== Group I ==
- Venue: La Manga Club, Murcia, Spain (outdoor clay)
- Date: 14–18 April

The sixteen teams were divided into four pools of four teams. The top teams of each pool play-off in a two-round knockout stage to decide which nations progress to World Group II play-offs. The three nations winning the least rubbers were relegated to Europe/Africa Zone Group II for 1999.

=== Pools ===
	Pool A	BLR	GRE	SLO	ISR
1	Belarus (3–0)		2–1	3–0	2–1
2	Greece (2–1)	1–2		2–1	2–1
3	Slovenia (1–2)	0–3	1–2		2–1
4	Israel (0–3)	1–2	1–2	1–2	

	Pool B	POL	POR	GBR	MAD
1	Poland (3–0)		2–1	2–1	3–0
2	Portugal (2–1)	1–2		2–1	2–1
3	Great Britain (1–2)	1–2	1–2		3–0
4	Madagascar (0–3)	0–3	1–2	0–3	

	Pool C	RSA	ROU	LAT	BUL
1	South Africa (3–0)		3–0	3–0	2–1
2	Romania (2–1)	0–3		3–0	2–1
3	Latvia (1–2)	0–3	0–3		2–1
4	Bulgaria (0–3)	1–2	1–2	1–2	

	Pool D	SWE	UKR	YUG	HUN
1	Sweden (3–0)		2–1	2–1	3–0
2	Ukraine (2–1)	1–2		3–0	3–0
3	Yugoslavia (1–2)	1–2	0–3		2–1
4	Hungary (0–3)	0–3	0–3	1–2	

=== Knockout stage ===
Semifinals
Belarus	2
Ukraine	1
Portugal	0
South Africa	3
Poland	2
Greece	1
Romania	2
Sweden	1

Finals
Belarus	2
South Africa	0
Poland	2
Romania	0

- Belarus and Poland advanced to World Group II Play-offs.
- Israel, Madagascar and Hungary relegated to Group II in 1999.

== Group II ==
- Venue: Ali Bey Club, Manavgat, Turkey (outdoor clay)
- Date: 5–9 May

The twenty-two teams were divided into two pools of five and six. The top teams from each pool advanced to Group I for 1999.

=== Pools ===
	Pool A	DEN	LIT	TUN	ALG	CYP
1	Denmark (4–0)		3–0	2–1	3–0	2–1
2	Lithuania (2–2)	0–3		1–2	3–0	3–0
3	Tunisia (2–2)	1–2	2–1		0–2	3–0
4	Algeria (2–2)	0–3	0–3	2–0		3–0
5	Cyprus (0–4)	1–2	0–3	0–3	0–3	

	Pool B	FIN	MKD	EGY	LIE	BOT
1	Finland (4–0)		2–1	3–0	3–0	3–0
2	Macedonia (3–1)	1–2		2–1	3–0	3–0
3	Egypt (2–2)	0–3	1–2		2–1	2–0
4	Liechtenstein (1–3)	0–3	0–3	1–2		3–0
5	Botswana (0–4)	0–3	0–3	0–2	0–3	

	Pool C	LUX	TUR	NOR	ARM	MLT	ETH
1	Luxembourg (5–0)		2–1	3–0	2–1	3–0	3–0
2	Turkey (4–1)	1–2		3–0	2–1	2–1	3–0
3	Norway (3–2)	0–3	0–3		2–1	3–0	3–0
4	Armenia (2–3)	1–2	1–2	1–2		2–1	3–0
5	Malta (1–4)	0–3	1–2	0–3	1–2		2–0
6	Ethiopia (0–5)	0–3	0–3	0–3	0–3	0–2	

	Pool D	GEO	EST	IRL	BIH	MDA	ISL
1	Georgia (5–0)		2–1	3–0	2–1	3–0	3–0
2	Estonia (3–2)	1–2		1–2	2–1	2–1	3–0
3	Ireland (3–2)	0–3	2–1		1–2	2–1	3–0
4	Bosnia and Herzegovina (2–3)	1–2	1–2	2–1		1–2	3–0
5	Moldova (2–3)	0–3	1–2	1–2	2–1		3–0
6	Iceland (0–5)	0–3	0–3	0–3	0–3	0–3	

- Denmark, Finland, Luxembourg and Georgia advanced to Group I in 1999.

== See also ==
- Fed Cup structure
