= 2000 Fed Cup Europe/Africa Zone =

Subsection of tennis competition

The Europe/Africa Zone was one of three zones of regional competition in the 2000 Fed Cup.

== Group I ==
- Venue: La Manga Club, Murcia, Spain (outdoor clay)
- Date: 15–21 May

The eighteen teams were divided into four pools, two of which had four and two of which had five teams. The top team of each pool played-off in a two-round knockout stage to decide which nation progresses to the World Group play-offs next year. The four nations coming last in the pools were relegated to Group II for 2001.

=== Pools ===
	Pool A	NED	BUL	SWE	TUR
1	Netherlands (3–0)		3–0	3–0	3–0
2	Bulgaria (2–1)	0–3		2–1	3–0
3	Sweden (1–2)	0–3	1–2		2–1
4	Turkey (0–3)	0–3	0–3	1–2	

	Pool B	HUN	RSA	GRE	LAT
1	Hungary (3–0)		2–1	3–0	3–0
2	South Africa (2–1)	1–2		2–1	3–0
3	Greece (1–2)	0–3	1–2		3–0
4	Latvia (0–3)	0–3	0–3	0–3	

	Pool C	BLR	SLO	ROU	POL	MAR
1	Belarus (4–0)		2–1	3–0	3–0	3–0
2	Slovenia (3–1)	1–2		3–0	3–0	2–0
3	Romania (2–2)	0–3	0–3		3–0	3–0
4	Poland (1–3)	0–3	0–3	0–3		3–0
5	Morocco (0–4)	0–3	0–2	0–3	0–3	

	Pool D	ISR	LUX	UKR	GBR	FIN
1	Israel (3–1)		2–1	1–2	2–1	3–0
2	Luxembourg (3–1)	1–2		2–1	2–1	3–0
3	Ukraine (2–2)	2–1	1–2		1–2	3–0
4	Great Britain (2–2)	1–2	1–2	2–1		2–1
5	Finland (0–4)	0–3	0–3	0–3	1–2	

=== Knockout stage ===
Semifinals; 20 May
Netherlands	2
Israel	1
Belarus	0
Hungary	2

Final; 21 May
Netherlands	0
Hungary	2

- Hungary advanced to the 2001 World Group play-offs.
- Turkey, Latvia, Morocco and Finland relegated to Group II in 2001.

== Group II ==
- Venue: Estoril T.C., Estoril, Portugal (outdoor clay)
- Date: 28 March – 1 April

The twenty-three teams were divided into three pools of six and one pool of five. The top teams from each pool advanced to Group I for 2001.

=== Pools ===
	Pool A	MKD	IRL	MLT	MRI	KEN
1	Macedonia (4–0)		2–1	2–1	3–0	3–0
2	Ireland (3–1)	1–2		2–1	3–0	3–0
3	Malta (2–2)	1–2	1–2		3–0	3–0
4	Mauritius (1–3)	0–3	0–3	0–3		1–0
5	Kenya (0–4)	0–3	0–3	0–3	0–1	

	Pool B	DEN	BIH	TUN	LIE	BOT	ISL
1	Denmark (5–0)		3–0	1–0	3–0	3–0	3–0
2	Bosnia and Herzegovina (4–1)	0–3		3–0	1–0	3–0	3–0
3	Tunisia (3–2)	0–1	0–3		2–1	3–0	3–0
4	Liechtenstein (2–3)	0–3	0–1	1–2		3–0	3–0
5	Botswana (1–4)	0–3	0–3	0–3	0–3		1–0
6	Iceland (0–5)	0–3	0–3	0–3	0–3	0–1	

	Pool C	YUG	GEO	LIT	EGY	ARM	CYP
1	Yugoslavia (5–0)		2–1	3–0	w/o	3–0	3–0
2	Georgia (4–1)	1–2		1–0	3–0	3–0	3–0
3	Lithuania (3–2)	0–3	0–1		3–0	2–1	3–0
4	Egypt (2–3)	w/o	0–3	0–3		2–1	3–0
5	Armenia (1–4)	0–3	0–3	1–2	1–2		1–0
6	Cyprus (0–5)	0–3	0–3	0–3	0–1	0–1	

	Pool D	EST	MDA	POR	ALG	MAD	LES
1	Estonia (5–0)		2–1	1–0	3–0	3–0	3–0
2	Moldova (4–1)	1–2		2–1	3–0	1–0	3–0
3	Portugal (3–2)	0–1	1–2		2–1	3–0	3–0
4	Algeria (2–3)	0–3	0–3	1–2		2–1	1–0
5	Madagascar (1–4)	0–3	0–1	0–3	1–2		2–1
6	Lesotho (0–5)	0–3	0–3	0–3	0–1	1–2	

- Macedonia, Denmark, Yugoslavia and Estonia advanced to Group I in 2001.

== See also ==
- Fed Cup structure
