= 1998 Fed Cup Europe/Africa Zone Group I – Knockout Stage =

Knockout Stage of the 1998 Fed Cup Europe/Africa Zone Group I

The Knockout Stage of the 1998 Fed Cup Europe/Africa Zone Group I was the final stage of the Zonal Competition involving teams from Europe and Africa. Those that qualified for this stage placed first and second in their respective pools.

Placing	Pool A	Pool B	Pool C	Pool D
1	Belarus	Poland	South Africa	Sweden
2	Greece	Portugal	Romania	Ukraine
3	Slovenia	Great Britain	Latvia	Yugoslavia
4	Israel	Madagascar	Bulgaria	Hungary

The eight teams were then randomly drawn into two two-stage knockout tournaments, with the winners advancing to the World Group II Play-offs.

== Draw ==
Semifinals
Belarus	2
Ukraine	1
Portugal	0
South Africa	3
Poland	2
Greece	1
Romania	2
Sweden	1

Finals
Belarus	2
South Africa	0
Poland	2
Romania	0

=== Semifinals ===
==== Belarus vs. Ukraine ====
Belarus
2
La Manga Club, Murcia, Spain
17 April 1997
Red clay (outdoors)

Ukraine
1

			1	2	3
1	(Belarus) (Ukraine)	Olga Barabanschikova; Anna Zaporozhanova	6; 1	6; 1
2	(Belarus) (Ukraine)	Natasha Zvereva; Elena Tatarkova	6; 2	6; 4
3	(Belarus) (Ukraine)	Nadejda Ostrovskaya / Tatiana Poutchek; Tatiana Kovalchuk / Olga Teplynska	6^{6} 7^{8}	4; 6

==== Portugal vs. South Africa ====
Portugal
0
La Manga Club, Murcia, Spain
17 April 1997
Red clay (outdoors)

South Africa
3

			1	2	3
1	(Portugal) (South Africa)	Cristina Correia; Jessica Steck	1; 6	3; 6
2	(Portugal) (South Africa)	Sofia Prazeres; Mariaan de Swardt	6; 4	2; 6	3; 6
3	(Portugal) (South Africa)	Cristina Correia / Ana Catarina Nogueira; Esmé de Villiers / Liezel Horn	3; 6	2; 6

==== Poland vs. Greece ====
Poland
2
La Manga Club, Murcia, Spain
17 April 1998
Red clay (outdoors)

Greece
1

			1	2	3
1	(Poland) (Greece)	Aleksandra Olsza; Eleni Daniilidou	4; 6	6; 1	6; 4
2	(Poland) (Greece)	Magdalena Grzybowska; Christína Papadáki	6; 4	6; 1
3	(Poland) (Greece)	Sylwia Rynarzewska / Katarzyna Teodorowicz-Lisowska; Eleni Daniilidou / Christína Papadáki	3; 6	1; 6

==== Romania vs. Sweden ====
Romania
2
La Manga Club, Murcia, Spain
17 April 1998
Red clay (outdoors)

Sweden
1

			1	2	3
1	(Romania) (Sweden)	Alice Pirsu; Kristina Triska	4; 6	2; 6
2	(Romania) (Sweden)	Raluca Sandu; Åsa Carlsson	2; 6	6; 1	8; 6
3	(Romania) (Sweden)	Alice Pirsu / Raluca Sandu; Åsa Carlsson / Kristina Triska	6; 3	3; 6	6; 3

=== Finals ===
==== Belarus vs. South Africa ====
Belarus
2
La Manga Club, Murcia, Spain
18 April 1997
Red clay (outdoors)

South Africa
0

			1	2	3
1	(Belarus) (South Africa)	Olga Barabanschikova; Jessica Steck	7^{7} 6^{2}	7^{7} 6^{4}
2	(Belarus) (South Africa)	Natasha Zvereva; Mariaan de Swardt	4; 6	6; 4	6; 2
3	(Belarus) (South Africa)					not played

- Belarus advanced to the World Group II Play-offs, where they were drawn against Venezuela. They won 4–1, and thus proceeded to the 1999 World Group II.

==== Poland vs. Romania ====
Poland
2
La Manga Club, Murcia, Spain
18 April 1998
Red clay (outdoors)

Romania
0

			1	2	3
1	(Poland) (Romania)	Aleksandra Olsza; Alice Pirsu	7; 5	6; 1
2	(Poland) (Romania)	Magdalena Grzybowska; Raluca Sandu	7; 5	6; 1
3	(Poland) (Romania)					not played

- Poland advanced to the World Group II Play-offs, where they were drawn against Austria. They lost 0–5, and thus fell back to Group I in 1999.

== See also ==
- Fed Cup structure
