= 1998 Fed Cup Europe/Africa Zone Group I – Pool C =

International tennis competition

Group C of the 1998 Fed Cup Europe/Africa Zone Group I was one of four pools in the Europe/Africa Zone Group I of the 1998 Fed Cup. Four teams competed in a round robin competition, with the top two teams advancing to the knockout stage.

	(South Africa) RSA	(Romania) ROU	(Latvia) LAT	(Bulgaria) BUL	RR; W–L	Set; W–L	Game; W–L	Standings
South Africa		3–0	3–0	2–1	3–0	17–4	122–68	1
Romania	0–3		3–0	2–1	2–1	12–8	104–85	2
Latvia	0–3	0–3		2–1	1–2	5–15	64–111	3
Bulgaria	1–2	1–2	1–2		0–3	7–15	87–113	4

== South Africa vs. Latvia ==
South Africa
3
La Manga Club, Murcia, Spain
14 April 1998
Red clay (outdoors)

Latvia
0

			1	2	3
1	(South Africa) (Latvia)	Jessica Steck; Agnese Blumberga	6; 0	5; 7	6; 3
2	(South Africa) (Latvia)	Mariaan de Swardt; Elena Krutko	6; 0	6; 3
3	(South Africa) (Latvia)	Liezel Horn / Esmé de Villiers; Līga Dekmeijere / Elena Krutko	6; 0	6; 0

== Romania vs. Bulgaria ==
Romania
2
La Manga Club, Murcia, Spain
14 April 1998
Red clay (outdoors)

Bulgaria
1

			1	2	3
1	(Romania) (Bulgaria)	Alice Pirsu; Desislava Topalova	6; 3	6; 2
2	(Romania) (Bulgaria)	Raluca Sandu; Magdalena Maleeva	6; 1	6; 3
3	(Romania) (Bulgaria)	Oana Elena Golimbioschi / Alice Pirsu; Filipa Gabrovska / Antoaneta Pandjerova	6; 4	4; 6	6^{3} 7^{7}

== South Africa vs. Bulgaria ==
South Africa
2
La Manga Club, Murcia, Spain
15 April 1998
Red clay (outdoors)

Bulgaria
1

			1	2	3
1	(South Africa) (Bulgaria)	Liezel Horn; Antoaneta Pandjerova	3; 6	7; 5	4; 6
2	(South Africa) (Bulgaria)	Mariaan de Swardt; Magdalena Maleeva	6; 1	7; 5
3	(South Africa) (Bulgaria)	Mariaan de Swardt / Esmé de Villiers; Filipa Gabrovska / Antoaneta Pandjerova	6; 0	6; 4

== Romania vs. Latvia ==
Romania
3
La Manga Club, Murcia, Spain
15 April 1998
Red clay (outdoors)

Latvia
0

			1	2	3
1	(Romania) (Latvia)	Alice Pirsu; Līga Dekmeijere	6; 4	6; 4
2	(Romania) (Latvia)	Raluca Sandu; Elena Krutko	6; 1	6; 2
3	(Romania) (Latvia)	Oana Elena Golimbioschi / Raluca Sandu; Agnese Blumberga / Līga Dekmeijere	6; 2	6; 4

== South Africa vs. Romania ==
South Africa
3
La Manga Club, Murcia, Spain
16 April 1998
Red clay (outdoors)

Romania
0

			1	2	3
1	(South Africa) (Romania)	Jessica Steck; Alice Pirsu	7; 5	6; 2
2	(South Africa) (Romania)	Mariaan de Swardt; Raluca Sandu	3; 6	6; 4	8; 6
3	(South Africa) (Romania)	Liezel Horn / Esmé de Villiers; Oana Elena Golimbioschi / Alice Pirsu	6; 4	6; 1

== Latvia vs. Bulgaria ==
Latvia
2
La Manga Club, Murcia, Spain
16 April 1998
Red clay (outdoors)

Bulgaria
1

			1	2	3
1	(Latvia) (Bulgaria)	Agnese Blumberga; Antoaneta Pandjerova	6^{3} 7^{7}	2; 6
2	(Latvia) (Bulgaria)	Elena Krutko; Magdalena Maleeva	7^{7} 6^{2}	1; 6	6; 1
3	(Latvia) (Bulgaria)	Agnese Blumberga / Elena Krutko; Antoaneta Pandjerova / Desislava Topalova	6; 4	6; 4

== See also ==
- Fed Cup structure
