= 2000 Fed Cup Europe/Africa Zone Group I – Pool B =

International tennis competition

Group B of the 2000 Fed Cup Europe/Africa Zone Group I was one of four pools in the Europe/Africa Zone Group I of the 2000 Fed Cup. Four teams competed in a round robin competition, with the top team advancing to the knockout stage.

	(Hungary) HUN	(South Africa) RSA	(Greece) GRE	(Latvia) LAT	RR; W–L	Set; W–L	Game; W–L	Standings
Hungary		2–1	3–0	3–0	3–0	16–4	114–65	1
South Africa	1–2		2–1	3–0	2–1	13–6	112–80	2
Greece	0–3	1–2		3–0	1–2	9–10	89–100	3
Latvia	0–3	0–3	0–3		0–3	0–18	50–110	4

== Hungary vs. Latvia ==
Hungary
3
La Manga Club, Murcia, Spain
16 May 2000
Red clay (outdoors)

Latvia
0

			1	2	3
1	(Hungary) (Latvia)	Anna Földényi; Katrina Banderę	6; 4	6; 3
2	(Hungary) (Latvia)	Rita Kuti-Kis; Elena Krutko	6; 0	6; 0
3	(Hungary) (Latvia)	Petra Mandula / Katalin Marosi; Katrina Banderę / Larisa Neiland	6; 2	6; 1

== South Africa vs. Greece ==
South Africa
2
La Manga Club, Murcia, Spain
16 May 2000
Red clay (outdoors)

Greece
1

			1	2	3
1	(South Africa) (Greece)	Surina De Beer; Maria Pavlidou	7; 5	6; 3
2	(South Africa) (Greece)	Mariaan de Swardt; Evagelia Roussi	5; 7	6^{8} 7^{10}
3	(South Africa) (Greece)	Surina De Beer / Liezel Huber; Asimina Kaplani / Maria Pavlidou	6; 2	6; 2

== Hungary vs. Greece ==
Hungary
3
La Manga Club, Murcia, Spain
17 May 2000
Red clay (outdoors)

Greece
0

			1	2	3
1	(Hungary) (Greece)	Katalin Marosi; Asimina Kaplani	6; 3	7^{7} 6^{5}
2	(Hungary) (Greece)	Rita Kuti-Kis; Evagelia Roussi	6; 2	6; 2
3	(Hungary) (Greece)	Anna Földényi / Petra Mandula; Asimina Kaplani / Maria Pavlidou	3; 6	6; 2	6; 4

== South Africa vs. Latvia ==
South Africa
3
La Manga Club, Murcia, Spain
17 May 2000
Red clay (outdoors)

Latvia
0

			1	2	3
1	(South Africa) (Latvia)	Esmé de Villiers; Katrina Banderę	6; 1	6; 3
2	(South Africa) (Latvia)	Surina De Beer; Elena Krutko	6; 2	6; 3
3	(South Africa) (Latvia)	Mariaan de Swardt / Liezel Huber; Katrina Banderę / Elena Krutko	6; 4	6; 3

== Hungary vs. South Africa ==
Hungary
2
La Manga Club, Murcia, Spain
18 May 2000
Red clay (outdoors)

South Africa
1

			1	2	3
1	(Hungary) (South Africa)	Anna Földényi; Surina De Beer	6^{2} 7^{7}	6; 1	7; 5
2	(Hungary) (South Africa)	Rita Kuti-Kis; Mariaan de Swardt	6; 2	6; 3
3	(Hungary) (South Africa)	Rita Kuti-Kis / Katalin Marosi; Esmé de Villiers / Liezel Huber	3; 6	4; 6

== Greece vs. Latvia ==
Greece
3
La Manga Club, Murcia, Spain
18 May 2000
Red clay (outdoors)

Latvia
0

			1	2	3
1	(Greece) (Latvia)	Maria Pavlidou; Katrina Banderę	7^{7} 6^{3}	6; 2
2	(Greece) (Latvia)	Evagelia Roussi; Elena Krutko	6; 3	6; 4
3	(Greece) (Latvia)	Eleni Daniilidou / Evagelia Roussi; Katrina Banderę / Elena Krutko	7; 5	6; 4

- Latvia failed to win any ties in the pool, and thus was relegated to Group II in 2001, where they placed second in their pool of four.

== See also ==
- Fed Cup structure
