= 1999 Fed Cup Europe/Africa Zone Group I – Pool B =

International tennis competition

Group B of the 1999 Fed Cup Europe/Africa Zone Group I was one of four pools in the Europe/Africa Zone Group I of the 1999 Fed Cup. Four teams competed in a round robin competition, with the top two teams advancing to the knockout stage.

	(Romania) ROU	(Sweden) SWE	(Greece) GRE	(Portugal) POR	RR; W–L	Set; W–L	Game; W–L	Standings
Romania		3–0	3–0	3–0	3–0	18–0	109–29	1
Sweden	0–3		3–0	3–0	2–1	12–9	89–86	2
Greece	0–3	0–3		2–1	1–2	5–16	76–114	3
Portugal	0–3	0–3	1–2		0–3	6–16	69–114	4

== Romania vs. Greece ==
Romania
3
La Manga Club, Murcia, Spain
19 April 1999
Red clay (outdoors)

Greece
0

			1	2	3
1	(Romania) (Greece)	Cătălina Cristea; Elpis Alexandrou	6; 3	6; 0
2	(Romania) (Greece)	Ruxandra Dragomir; Christína Papadáki	6; 0	6; 4
3	(Romania) (Greece)	Cătălina Cristea / Ruxandra Dragomir; Asimina Kaplani / Christína Papadáki	7; 5	6; 2

== Sweden vs. Portugal ==
Sweden
3
La Manga Club, Murcia, Spain
19 April 1999
Red clay (outdoors)

Portugal
0

			1	2	3
1	(Sweden) (Portugal)	Maria Wolfbrandt; Cristina Correia	2; 6	6; 1	6; 2
2	(Sweden) (Portugal)	Åsa Carlsson; Ana Catarina Nogueira	6; 4	6; 1
3	(Sweden) (Portugal)	Åsa Carlsson / Frida Engblom; Angela Cardoso / Cristina Correia	6; 2	4; 6	6; 2

== Romania vs. Portugal ==
Romania
3
La Manga Club, Murcia, Spain
20 April 1999
Red clay (outdoors)

Portugal
0

			1	2	3
1	(Romania) (Portugal)	Cătălina Cristea; Cristina Correia	6; 3	6; 0
2	(Romania) (Portugal)	Ruxandra Dragomir; Ana Catarina Nogueira	6; 0	6; 4
3	(Romania) (Portugal)	Cătălina Cristea / Ruxandra Dragomir; Angela Cardoso / Kátia Rodrigues	6; 1	6; 0

== Sweden vs. Greece ==
Sweden
3
La Manga Club, Murcia, Spain
20 April 1999
Red clay (outdoors)

Greece
0

			1	2	3
1	(Sweden) (Greece)	Maria Wolfbrandt; Asimina Kaplani	3; 6	6; 3	6; 1
2	(Sweden) (Greece)	Åsa Carlsson; Christína Papadáki	6; 4	6; 4
3	(Sweden) (Greece)	Diana Majkić / Frida Engblom; Asimina Kaplani / Evagelia Roussi	6; 3	7; 5

== Romania vs. Sweden ==
Romania
3
La Manga Club, Murcia, Spain
21 April 1999
Red clay (outdoors)

Sweden
0

			1	2	3
1	(Romania) (Sweden)	Cătălina Cristea; Diana Majkić	6; 2	6; 3
2	(Romania) (Sweden)	Ruxandra Dragomir; Åsa Carlsson	6; 2	6; 0
3	(Romania) (Sweden)	Cătălina Cristea / Ruxandra Dragomir; Frida Engblom / Diana Majkić	6; 0	6; 0

== Greece vs. Portugal ==
Greece
3
La Manga Club, Murcia, Spain
21 April 1999
Red clay (outdoors)

Portugal
0

			1	2	3
1	(Greece) (Portugal)	Elpis Alexandrou; Angela Cardoso	6; 4	3; 6	6; 3
2	(Greece) (Portugal)	Christína Papadáki; Ana Catarina Nogueira	6; 4	4; 6	6; 1
3	(Greece) (Portugal)	Asimina Kaplani / Evagelia Roussi; Angela Cardoso / Ana Catarina Nogueira	5; 7	0; 6

- Portugal failed to win any ties in the pool, and thus was relegated to Group II in 2000, where they placed third in their pool of six.

== See also ==
- Fed Cup structure
