= 2003 Fed Cup Europe/Africa Zone Group I – play-offs =

The play-offs of the 2003 Fed Cup Europe/Africa Zone Group I were the final stages of the Group I Zonal Competition involving teams from Europe and Africa. Those that qualified for this stage placed first and second in their respective pools.

Placing	Pool A	Pool B	Pool C	Pool D
1	Switzerland	Israel	South Africa	Hungary
2	Belarus	Yugoslavia	Ukraine	Netherlands
3	Estonia	Bulgaria	Denmark	Poland
4	Luxembourg	Georgia	Romania	Great Britain
5				Ireland

The eight teams were then randomly paired up the team from a different placing of another group for a play-off tie, with the winners being promoted to the World Group play-offs.

== Switzerland vs. Netherlands ==
Switzerland
2
Estoril, Portugal
26 April 2003
Red clay (outdoors)

Netherlands
0

			1	2	3
1	(Switzerland) (Netherlands)	Myriam Casanova; Elise Tamaëla	7^{7} 6^{2}	6; 3
2	(Switzerland) (Netherlands)	Patty Schnyder; Miriam Oremans	6; 3	6; 1
3	(Switzerland) (Netherlands)	Myriam Casanova / Patty Schnyder; Kristie Boogert / Miriam Oremans				not played

- Switzerland advanced to the World Group play-offs, where they were drawn against Israel. They won 4–1, and thus advanced to the World Group for next year.

== Israel vs. Belarus ==
Israel
2
Estoril, Portugal
26 April 2003
Red clay (outdoors)

Belarus
1

			1	2	3
1	(Israel) (Belarus)	Tzipora Obziler; Nadejda Ostrovskaya	4; 6	3; 6
2	(Israel) (Belarus)	Anna Smashnova; Tatiana Poutchek	6; 4	6; 0
3	(Israel) (Belarus)	Tzipora Obziler / Anna Smashnova; Olga Barabanschikova / Nadejda Ostrovskaya	1; 6	6; 4	8; 6

- Israel advanced to the World Group play-offs, where they were drawn against Switzerland. They lost 1–4, and thus were relegated back to Group I for next year.

== South Africa vs. Yugoslavia ==
South Africa
2
Estoril, Portugal
26 April 2003
Red clay (outdoors)

Yugoslavia
0

			1	2	3
1	(South Africa) (Federal Republic of Yugoslavia)	Chanelle Scheepers; Katarina Mišić	6; 2	6; 2
2	(South Africa) (Federal Republic of Yugoslavia)	Amanda Coetzer; Jelena Janković	7; 5	3; 6	6; 2
3	(South Africa) (Federal Republic of Yugoslavia)	Amanda Coetzer / Chanelle Scheepers; Katarina Mišić / Jelena Janković				not played

- South Africa advanced to the World Group play-offs, where they were drawn against Czech Republic. They lost 1–4, and thus were relegated back to Group I for next year.

== Hungary vs. Ukraine ==
Hungary
2
Estoril, Portugal
26 April 2003
Red clay (outdoors)

Ukraine
1

			1	2	3
1	(Hungary) (Ukraine)	Melinda Czink; Yuliya Beygelzimer	2; 6	6^{5} 7^{7}
2	(Hungary) (Ukraine)	Petra Mandula; Tatiana Perebiynis	4; 6	6; 4	6; 2
3	(Hungary) (Ukraine)	Zsófia Gubacsi / Petra Mandula; Yuliya Beygelzimer / Tatiana Perebiynis	1; 6	6; 1	6; 3

- Hungary advanced to the World Group play-offs, where they were drawn against Argentina. They lost 2–3, and thus were relegated back to Group I for next year.

== See also ==
- Fed Cup structure
