= 1999 Fed Cup Europe/Africa Zone Group I – Knockout Stage =

Tennis tournament knockout stage

The Knockout Stage of the 1999 Fed Cup Europe/Africa Zone Group I was the final stage of the Zonal Competition involving teams from Europe and Africa. Those that qualified for this stage placed first and second in their respective pools.

Placing	Pool A	Pool B	Pool C	Pool D
1	South Africa	Romania	Great Britain	Slovenia
2	Ukraine	Sweden	Bulgaria	Luxembourg
3	Latvia	Greece	Finland	Poland
4	Denmark	Portugal	Yugoslavia	Georgia

The eight teams were then randomly drawn into two two-stage knockout tournaments, with the winners advancing to the World Group II Play-offs.

== Draw ==
Semifinals
South Africa	2
Sweden	0
Bulgaria	1
Slovenia	2
Romania	2
Ukraine	0
Luxembourg	0
Great Britain	3

Finals
South Africa	1
Slovenia	2
Romania	2
Great Britain	0

=== Semifinals ===
==== South Africa vs. Sweden ====
South Africa
2
La Manga Club, Murcia, Spain
22 April 1999
Red clay (outdoors)

Sweden
0

			1	2	3
1	(South Africa) (Sweden)	Mariaan de Swardt; Maria Wolfbrandt	6; 1	6; 3
2	(South Africa) (Sweden)	Amanda Coetzer; Åsa Carlsson	6^{2} 7^{7}	6; 4	6; 1
3	(South Africa) (Sweden)					not played

==== Bulgaria vs. Slovenia ====
Bulgaria
1
La Manga Club, Murcia, Spain
22 April 1999
Red clay (outdoors)

Slovenia
2

			1	2	3
1	(Bulgaria) (Slovenia)	Desislava Topalova; Tina Hergold	6; 1	4; 6	6; 2
2	(Bulgaria) (Slovenia)	Pavlina Nola; Katarina Srebotnik	2; 6	2; 6
3	(Bulgaria) (Slovenia)	Antoaneta Pandjerova / Desislava Topalova; Tina Križan / Katarina Srebotnik	4; 6	1; 6

==== Romania vs. Ukraine ====
Romania
2
La Manga Club, Murcia, Spain
22 April 1999
Red clay (outdoors)

Ukraine
0

			1	2	3
1	(Romania) (Ukraine)	Cătălina Cristea; Natalia Medvedeva	6; 3	6; 1
2	(Romania) (Ukraine)	Ruxandra Dragomir; Elena Tatarkova	5; 7	6; 3	6; 1
3	(Romania) (Ukraine)					not played

==== Luxembourg vs. Great Britain ====
Luxembourg
0
La Manga Club, Murcia, Spain
22 April 1999
Red clay (outdoors)

Great Britain
3

			1	2	3
1	(Luxembourg) (United Kingdom)	Claudine Schaul; Joanne Ward	4; 6	2; 6
2	(Luxembourg) (United Kingdom)	Anne Kremer; Samantha Smith	4; 6	6; 1	3; 6
3	(Luxembourg) (United Kingdom)	Céline Francois / Fabienne Thill; Louise Latimer / Julie Pullin	2; 6	3; 6

=== Finals ===
==== South Africa vs. Slovenia ====
South Africa
1
La Manga Club, Murcia, Spain
23 April 1999
Red clay (outdoors)

Slovenia
2

			1	2	3
1	(South Africa) (Slovenia)	Mariaan de Swardt; Tina Križan	7; 5	6; 3
2	(South Africa) (Slovenia)	Amanda Coetzer; Katarina Srebotnik	4; 6	3; 6
3	(South Africa) (Slovenia)	Amanda Coetzer / Mariaan de Swardt; Tina Križan / Katarina Srebotnik	4; 6	3; 6

- Slovenia advanced to the World Group II Play-offs, where they placed last in their pool of four, and thus relegated back to Group I for 2000.

==== Romania vs. Great Britain ====
Romania
2
La Manga Club, Murcia, Spain
23 April 1999
Red clay (outdoors)

Great Britain
0

			1	2	3
1	(Romania) (United Kingdom)	Cătălina Cristea; Joanne Ward	6; 2	6; 2
2	(Romania) (United Kingdom)	Ruxandra Dragomir; Samantha Smith	6; 2	6; 3
3	(Romania) (United Kingdom)					not played

- Romania advanced to the World Group II Play-offs, where they placed third in their pool of four, and thus relegated back to Group I for 2000.

== See also ==
- Fed Cup structure
