= 1999 Fed Cup Europe/Africa Zone Group II – Pool A =

International tennis competition

Group A of the 1999 Fed Cup Europe/Africa Zone Group II was one of four pools in the Europe/Africa zone of the 1999 Fed Cup. Five teams competed in a round robin competition, with the top team advancing to Group I for 2000.

	(Hungary) HUN	(Bosnia and Herzegovina) BIH	(Madagascar) MAD	(Egypt) EGY	(Botswana) BOT	Match; W–L	Set; W–L	Game; W–L	Standings
Hungary		3–0	3–0	3–0	3–0	4–0	24–0	145–30	1
Bosnia and Herzegovina	0–3		3–0	3–0	3–0	3–1	18–6	128–74	2
Madagascar	0–3	0–3		2–1	2–1	2–2	9–17	89–119	3
Egypt	0–3	0–3	1–2		3–0	1–3	9–16	91–116	4
Botswana	0–3	0–3	1–2	0–3		0–4	2–23	32–146	5

== Bosnia and Herzegovina vs. Botswana ==
Bosnia and Herzegovina
3
La Manga Club, Murcia, Spain
26 April 1999
Red clay (outdoors)

Botswana
0

			1	2	3
1	(Bosnia and Herzegovina) (Botswana)	Sandra Martinović; Razalia Phethu	6; 0	6; 1
2	(Bosnia and Herzegovina) (Botswana)	Adriana Basarić; Kago Phatshwane	6; 0	6; 0
3	(Bosnia and Herzegovina) (Botswana)	Adriana Basarić / Sandra Martinović; Ntswaki Mawela / Razalia Phethu	6; 1	6; 1

== Madagascar vs. Egypt ==
Madagascar
2
La Manga Club, Murcia, Spain
26 April 1999
Red clay (outdoors)

Egypt
1

			1	2	3
1	(Madagascar) (Egypt)	Valisoa Rafolomanantsiatosika; Dina Khalil	3; 6	1; 6
2	(Madagascar) (Egypt)	Aina Rafolomanantsiatosika; Sara Abaza	6; 3	4; 6	6; 3
3	(Madagascar) (Egypt)	Aina Rafolomanantsiatosika / Mirina Rajaoarisoa; Sara Abaza / Dalia El Sheikh	6; 0	6; 1

== Hungary vs. Madagascar ==
Hungary
3
La Manga Club, Murcia, Spain
27 April 1999
Red clay (outdoors)

Madagascar
0

			1	2	3
1	(Hungary) (Madagascar)	Anna Földényi; Valisoa Rafolomanantsiatosika	6; 0	6; 1
2	(Hungary) (Madagascar)	Rita Kuti-Kis; Aina Rafolomanantsiatosika	6; 1	6; 2
3	(Hungary) (Madagascar)	Zsófia Gubacsi / Petra Mandula; Aina Rafolomanantsiatosika / Mirina Rajaoarisoa	6; 1	6; 1

== Bosnia and Herzegovina vs. Egypt ==
Bosnia and Herzegovina
3
La Manga Club, Murcia, Spain
27 April 1999
Red clay (outdoors)

Egypt
0

			1	2	3
1	(Bosnia and Herzegovina) (Egypt)	Sandra Martinović; Dina Khalil	6; 1	6; 0
2	(Bosnia and Herzegovina) (Egypt)	Adriana Basarić; Yomna Farid	6; 4	4; 6	6; 3
3	(Bosnia and Herzegovina) (Egypt)	Adriana Basarić / Harisa Delić; Sara Abaza / Dalia El Sheikh	6; 2	7; 5

== Hungary vs. Botswana ==
Hungary
3
La Manga Club, Murcia, Spain
28 April 1999
Red clay (outdoors)

Botswana
0

			1	2	3
1	(Hungary) (Botswana)	Petra Mandula; Ntswaki Mawela	6; 0	6; 0
2	(Hungary) (Botswana)	Anna Földényi; Kago Phatshwane	6; 0	6; 0
3	(Hungary) (Botswana)	Zsófia Gubacsi / Petra Mandula; Ntswaki Mawela / Razalia Phethu	6; 0	6; 1

== Bosnia and Herzegovina vs. Madagascar ==
Bosnia and Herzegovina
3
La Manga Club, Murcia, Spain
28 April 1999
Red clay (outdoors)

Madagascar
0

			1	2	3
1	(Bosnia and Herzegovina) (Madagascar)	Sandra Martinović; Valisoa Rafolomanantsiatosika	6; 1	6; 0
2	(Bosnia and Herzegovina) (Madagascar)	Adriana Basarić; Aina Rafolomanantsiatosika	6; 1	7^{7} 6^{4}
3	(Bosnia and Herzegovina) (Madagascar)	Adriana Basarić / Harisa Delić; Aina Rafolomanantsiatosika / Mirina Rajaoarisoa	6; 3	6; 2

== Hungary vs. Egypt ==
Hungary
3
La Manga Club, Murcia, Spain
29 April 1999
Red clay (outdoors)

Egypt
0

			1	2	3
1	(Hungary) (Egypt)	Zsófia Gubacsi; Dalia El Sheikh	6; 3	6; 1
2	(Hungary) (Egypt)	Rita Kuti-Kis; Dina Khalil	6; 0	6; 1
3	(Hungary) (Egypt)	Anna Földényi / Petra Mandula; Sara Abaza / Dalia El Sheikh	6; 3	6; 1

== Madagascar vs. Botswana ==
Madagascar
2
La Manga Club, Murcia, Spain
29 April 1999
Red clay (outdoors)

Botswana
1

			1	2	3
1	(Madagascar) (Botswana)	Dominique Toliravo; Razalia Phethu	7^{7} 6^{2}	5; 7	2; 6
2	(Madagascar) (Botswana)	Aina Rafolomanantsiatosika; Kago Phatshwane	6; 1	6; 1
3	(Madagascar) (Botswana)	Aina Rafolomanantsiatosika / Mirina Rajaoarisoa; Ntswaki Mawela / Kago Phatshwane	6; 0	6; 0

== Hungary vs. Bosnia and Herzegovina ==
Hungary
3
La Manga Club, Murcia, Spain
30 April 1999
Red clay (outdoors)

Bosnia and Herzegovina
0

			1	2	3
1	(Hungary) (Bosnia and Herzegovina)	Anna Földényi; Sandra Martinović	6; 2	6; 3
2	(Hungary) (Bosnia and Herzegovina)	Rita Kuti-Kis; Adriana Basarić	6; 3	7; 5
3	(Hungary) (Bosnia and Herzegovina)	Anna Földényi / Petra Mandula; Adriana Basarić / Harisa Delić	6; 0	6; 1

== Egypt vs. Botswana ==
Egypt
3
La Manga Club, Murcia, Spain
30 April 1999
Red clay (outdoors)

Botswana
0

			1	2	3
1	(Egypt) (Botswana)	Sara Abaza; Razalia Phethu	6; 1	6; 3
2	(Egypt) (Botswana)	Dalia El Sheikh; Kago Phatshwane	6; 0	6; 1
3	(Egypt) (Botswana)	Yomna Farid / Dina Khalil; Kago Phatshwane / Razalia Phethu	6; 2	6; 0

- Hungary placed first in this group and thus advanced to Group I for 2000, where they placed first overall and thus advanced the 2001 World Group play-offs.

== See also ==
- Fed Cup structure
