= 1999 Fed Cup Europe/Africa Zone Group II – Pool B =

International tennis competition

Group A of the 1999 Fed Cup Europe/Africa Zone Group II was one of four pools in the Europe/Africa zone of the 1999 Fed Cup. Five teams competed in a round robin competition, with the top team advancing to Group I for 2000.

	(Israel) ISR	(Moldova) MDA	(Tunisia) TUN	(Armenia) ARM	(Iceland) ISL	Match; W–L	Set; W–L	Game; W–L	Standings
Israel		3–0	2–0	3–0	3–0	4–0	22–0	130–20	1
Moldova	0–3		2–1	3–0	3–0	3–1	15–9	108–83	2
Tunisia	0–2	1–2		3–0	3–0	2–2	15–7	105–71	3
Armenia	0–3	0–3	0–3		3–0	1–3	6–18	74–132	4
Iceland	0–3	0–3	0–3	0–3		0–4	0–23	33–146	5

== Israel vs. Moldova ==
Israel
3
La Manga Club, Murcia, Spain
26 April 1999
Red clay (outdoors)

Moldova
0

			1	2	3
1	(Israel) (Moldova)	Hila Rosen; Evghenia Ablovatchi	6; 0	6; 0
2	(Israel) (Moldova)	Anna Smashnova; Tanya Volkova	6; 0	6; 2
3	(Israel) (Moldova)	Tzipora Obziler / Hila Rosen; Evghenia Ablovatchi / Tanya Volkova	6; 2	6; 2

== Armenia vs. Iceland ==
Armenia
3
La Manga Club, Murcia, Spain
26 April 1999
Red clay (outdoors)

Iceland
0

			1	2	3
1	(Armenia) (Iceland)	Susanna Bostanjyan; Rakel Petursdóttir	7; 5	6; 2
2	(Armenia) (Iceland)	Sona Saringulyan; Stefanía Stefánsdóttir	6; 4	6; 3
3	(Armenia) (Iceland)	Susanna Bostanjyan / Sona Saringulyan; Rakel Petursdóttir / Stefania Stefánsdóttir	7; 5	6; 4

== Israel vs. Iceland ==
Israel
3
La Manga Club, Murcia, Spain
27 April 1999
Red clay (outdoors)

Iceland
0

			1	2	3
1	(Israel) (Iceland)	Tzipora Obziler; Margarita Akbacheva	6; 0	6; 0
2	(Israel) (Iceland)	Hila Rosen; Stefanía Stefánsdóttir	6; 0	6; 0
3	(Israel) (Iceland)	Tzipora Obziler / Anna Smashnova; Ingunn Eiríksdóttir / Stefanía Stefánsdóttir	6; 0	6; 0

== Moldova vs. Tunisia ==
Moldova
2
La Manga Club, Murcia, Spain
27 April 1999
Red clay (outdoors)

Tunisia
1

			1	2	3
1	(Moldova) (Tunisia)	Evghenia Ablovatchi; Ines Zouabi	6; 3	6; 2
2	(Moldova) (Tunisia)	Tanya Volkova; Selima Sfar	3; 6	0; 6
3	(Moldova) (Tunisia)	Evghenia Ablovatchi / Tanya Volkova; Issem Essaies / Selima Sfar	6; 4	3; 6	6; 4

== Israel vs. Armenia ==
Israel
3
La Manga Club, Murcia, Spain
28 April 1999
Red clay (outdoors)

Armenia
0

			1	2	3
1	(Israel) (Armenia)	Hila Rosen; Susanna Bostanjyan	6; 0	6; 0
2	(Israel) (Armenia)	Anna Smashnova; Sona Saringulyan	6; 0	6; 3
3	(Israel) (Armenia)	Nataly Cahana / Tzipora Obziler; Tatevik Babayan / Irina Voskanyan	6; 0	6; 4

== Tunisia vs. Iceland ==
Tunisia
3
La Manga Club, Murcia, Spain
28 April 1999
Red clay (outdoors)

Iceland
0

			1	2	3
1	(Tunisia) (Iceland)	Ines Zouabi; Rakel Petursdóttir	7; 5	6; 2
2	(Tunisia) (Iceland)	Selima Sfar; Stefanía Stefánsdóttir	6; 4	6; 3
3	(Tunisia) (Iceland)	Issem Essaies / Ines Zouabi; Margarita Akbacheva / Ingunn Eiríksdóttir	7; 5	6; 4

== Moldova vs. Iceland ==
Moldova
3
La Manga Club, Murcia, Spain
29 April 1999
Red clay (outdoors)

Iceland
0

			1	2	3
1	(Moldova) (Iceland)	Evghenia Ablovatchi; Rakel Petursdóttir	6; 1	6; 4
2	(Moldova) (Iceland)	Natalia Volcova; Stefanía Stefánsdóttir	6; 0	6; 1
3	(Moldova) (Iceland)	Evghenia Ablovatchi / Natalia Volcova; Rakel Petursdóttir / Stefania Stefánsdóttir	6; 1			retired

== Tunisia vs. Armenia ==
Tunisia
3
La Manga Club, Murcia, Spain
29 April 1999
Red clay (outdoors)

Armenia
0

			1	2	3
1	(Tunisia) (Armenia)	Ines Zouabi; Susanna Bostanjyan	7; 5	6; 3
2	(Tunisia) (Armenia)	Selima Sfar; Sona Saringulyan	6; 4	6; 0
3	(Tunisia) (Armenia)	Issem Essaies / Ines Zouabi; Tatevik Babayan / Irina Voskanyan	6; 0	6; 2

== Israel vs. Tunisia ==
Israel
2
La Manga Club, Murcia, Spain
30 April 1999
Red clay (outdoors)

Tunisia
0

			1	2	3
1	(Israel) (Tunisia)	Hila Rosen; Ines Zouabi	6; 0	6; 1
2	(Israel) (Tunisia)	Anna Smashnova; Selima Sfar	6; 4	6; 2
3	(Israel) (Tunisia)					not played

== Moldova vs. Armenia ==
Moldova
3
La Manga Club, Murcia, Spain
30 April 1999
Red clay (outdoors)

Armenia
0

			1	2	3
1	(Moldova) (Armenia)	Evghenia Ablovatchi; Tatevik Babayan	6; 2	6; 1
2	(Moldova) (Armenia)	Tanya Volkova; Irina Voskanyan	6; 4	6; 3
3	(Moldova) (Armenia)	Elena Arabadji / Olga Ćosić; Tatevik Babayan / Susanna Bostanjyan	6; 3	6; 2

- Israel placed first in this group and thus advanced to Group I for 2000, where they placed equal third.

== See also ==
- Fed Cup structure
