= 2000 Fed Cup Europe/Africa Zone Group I – Knockout Stage =

International tennis competition

The Knockout Stage of the 2000 Fed Cup Europe/Africa Zone Group I was the final stage of the Zonal Competition involving teams from Europe and Africa. Those that qualified for this stage placed first in their respective pools.

Placing	Pool A	Pool B	Pool C	Pool D
1	Netherlands	Hungary	Belarus	Israel
2	Bulgaria	South Africa	Slovenia	Luxembourg
3	Sweden	Greece	Romania	Ukraine
4	Turkey	Portugal	Poland	Great Britain
5			Morocco	Finland

The four teams were then randomly drawn into a two-stage knockout tournament, with the winner advancing to the World Group play-offs next year.

== Draw ==
Semifinals; 20 May
Netherlands	2
Israel	1
Belarus	0
Hungary	2

Final; 21 May
Netherlands	0
Hungary	2

=== Semifinals ===
==== Netherlands vs. Israel ====
Netherlands
2
La Manga Club, Murcia, Spain
20 May 2000
Red clay (outdoors)

Israel
1

			1	2	3
1	(Netherlands) (Israel)	Amanda Hopmans; Hila Rosen	7^{7} 6^{2}	6; 3
2	(Netherlands) (Israel)	Seda Noorlander; Anna Smashnova	2; 6	3; 6
3	(Netherlands) (Israel)	Amanda Hopmans / Miriam Oremans; Tzipora Obziler / Hila Rosen	6; 0	3; 6	6; 4

==== Belarus vs. Hungary ====
Belarus
0
La Manga Club, Murcia, Spain
20 May 2000
Red clay (outdoors)

Hungary
2

			1	2	3
1	(Belarus) (Hungary)	Nadejda Ostrovskaya; Anna Földényi	3; 6	4; 6
2	(Belarus) (Hungary)	Olga Barabanschikova; Rita Kuti-Kis	2; 6	0; 6
3	(Belarus) (Hungary)					not played

=== Final ===
==== Netherlands vs. Hungary ====
Netherlands
0
La Manga Club, Murcia, Spain
21 May 2000
Red clay (outdoors)

Hungary
2

			1	2	3
1	(Netherlands) (Hungary)	Miriam Oremans; Anna Földényi	2; 6	6^{3} 7^{7}
2	(Netherlands) (Hungary)	Seda Noorlander; Rita Kuti-Kis	0; 6	1; 6
3	(Netherlands) (Hungary)					not played

== See also ==
- Fed Cup structure
