= 1998 Fed Cup Europe/Africa Zone Group I – Pool B =

International tennis competition

Group B of the 1998 Fed Cup Europe/Africa Zone Group I was one of four pools in the Europe/Africa Zone Group I of the 1998 Fed Cup. Four teams competed in a round robin competition, with the top two teams advancing to the knockout stage.

	(Poland) POL	(Portugal) POR	(United Kingdom) GBR	(Madagascar) MAD	RR; W–L	Set; W–L	Game; W–L	Standings
Poland		2–1	2–1	3–0	3–0	14–6	109–58	1
Portugal	1–2		2–1	2–1	2–1	11–10	95–91	2
Great Britain	1–2	1–2		3–0	1–2	12–9	102–94	3
Madagascar	0–3	1–2	0–3		0–3	4–16	48–111	4

== Poland vs. Madagascar ==
Poland
3
La Manga Club, Murcia, Spain
14 April 1998
Red clay (outdoors)

Madagascar
0

			1	2	3
1	(Poland) (Madagascar)	Aleksandra Olsza; Natacha Randriantefy	6; 2	4; 6	6; 1
2	(Poland) (Madagascar)	Magdalena Grzybowska; Aina Rafolomanantsiatosika	6; 0	6; 1
3	(Poland) (Madagascar)	Aleksandra Olsza / Katarzyna Teodorowicz-Lisowska; Aina Rafolomanantsiatosika / Mirina Rajaoarisoa	6; 0	6; 0

== Portugal vs. Great Britain ==
Portugal
2
La Manga Club, Murcia, Spain
14 April 1998
Red clay (outdoors)

Great Britain
1

			1	2	3
1	(Portugal) (United Kingdom)	Ana Catarina Nogueira; Louise Latimer	6^{5} 7^{7}	6^{6} 7^{8}
2	(Portugal) (United Kingdom)	Sofia Prazeres; Karen Cross	2; 6	6; 2	6; 4
3	(Portugal) (United Kingdom)	Ana Catarina Nogueira / Sofia Prazeres; Julie Pullin / Lorna Woodroffe	2; 6	6; 2	6; 4

== Poland vs. Great Britain ==
Poland
2
La Manga Club, Murcia, Spain
15 April 1998
Red clay (outdoors)

Great Britain
1

			1	2	3
1	(Poland) (United Kingdom)	Aleksandra Olsza; Louise Latimer	7^{7} 6^{5}	6; 0
2	(Poland) (United Kingdom)	Magdalena Grzybowska; Karen Cross	6; 1	6; 2
3	(Poland) (United Kingdom)	Aleksandra Olsza / Sylwia Rynarzewska; Julie Pullin / Lorna Woodroffe	6^{7} 7^{9}	3; 6

== Portugal vs. Madagascar ==
Portugal
2
La Manga Club, Murcia, Spain
15 April 1998
Red clay (outdoors)

Madagascar
1

			1	2	3
1	(Portugal) (Madagascar)	Ana Catarina Nogueira; Natacha Randriantefy	4; 6	3; 6
2	(Portugal) (Madagascar)	Sofia Prazeres; Aina Rafolomanantsiatosika	6; 2	6; 0
3	(Portugal) (Madagascar)	Ana Catarina Nogueira / Sofia Prazeres; Mirina Rajaoarisoa / Natacha Randriantefy	6; 2	6; 0

== Poland vs. Portugal ==
Poland
2
La Manga Club, Murcia, Spain
16 April 1998
Red clay (outdoors)

Portugal
1

			1	2	3
1	(Poland) (Portugal)	Aleksandra Olsza; Cristina Correia	6; 2	3; 6	6; 2
2	(Poland) (Portugal)	Magdalena Grzybowska; Sofia Prazeres	2; 6	6^{2} 7^{7}
3	(Poland) (Portugal)	Magdalena Grzybowska / Aleksandra Olsza; Cristina Correia / Ana Catarina Nogueira	6; 1	6; 2

== Great Britain vs. Madagascar ==
Great Britain
3
La Manga Club, Murcia, Spain
16 April 1998
Red clay (outdoors)

Madagascar
0

			1	2	3
1	(United Kingdom) (Madagascar)	Louise Latimer; Natacha Randriantefy	6; 4	4; 6	6; 3
2	(United Kingdom) (Madagascar)	Karen Cross; Faratiana Rasoarilalao	6; 1	6; 3
3	(United Kingdom) (Madagascar)	Louise Latimer / Julie Pullin; Aina Rafolomanantsiatosika / Natacha Randriantefy	6; 3	6; 2

- Madagascar failed to win any ties in the pool, and thus was relegated to Group II in 1999, where they placed third in their pool of five.

== See also ==
- Fed Cup structure
