= 1999 Fed Cup Europe/Africa Zone Group I – Pool A =

International tennis competition

Group A of the 1999 Fed Cup Europe/Africa Zone Group I was one of four pools in the Europe/Africa Zone Group I of the 1999 Fed Cup. Four teams competed in a round robin competition, with the top two teams advancing to the knockout stage.

	(South Africa) RSA	(Ukraine) UKR	(Latvia) LAT	(Denmark) DEN	RR; W–L	Set; W–L	Game; W–L	Standings
South Africa		3–0	3–0	3–0	3–0	18–1	114–55	1
Ukraine	0–3		2–1	2–1	2–1	8–12	91–97	2
Latvia	0–3	1–2		2–1	1–2	8–12	77–99	3
Denmark	0–3	1–2	1–2		0–3	5–14	68–99	4

== South Africa vs. Denmark ==
South Africa
3
La Manga Club, Murcia, Spain
19 April 1999
Red clay (outdoors)

Denmark
0

			1	2	3
1	(South Africa) (Denmark)	Mariaan de Swardt; Charlotte Aagaard	7; 5	6; 1
2	(South Africa) (Denmark)	Amanda Coetzer; Eva Dyrberg	6; 2	7; 5
3	(South Africa) (Denmark)	Amanda Coetzer / Liezel Horn; Charlotte Aagaard / Eva Dyrberg	6; 2	6; 2

== Ukraine vs. Latvia ==
Ukraine
2
La Manga Club, Murcia, Spain
19 April 1999
Red clay (outdoors)

Latvia
1

			1	2	3
1	(Ukraine) (Latvia)	Tatiana Perebiynis; Katrina Banderę	6^{5} 7^{7}	6^{6} 7^{8}
2	(Ukraine) (Latvia)	Elena Tatarkova; Elena Krutko	6; 2	6; 1
3	(Ukraine) (Latvia)	Natalia Medvedeva / Elena Tatarkova; Katrina Banderę / Larisa Neiland	3; 6	6; 4	6; 3

== South Africa vs. Latvia ==
South Africa
3
La Manga Club, Murcia, Spain
20 April 1999
Red clay (outdoors)

Latvia
0

			1	2	3
1	(South Africa) (Latvia)	Mariaan de Swardt; Katrina Banderę	6; 2	6; 3
2	(South Africa) (Latvia)	Amanda Coetzer; Elena Krutko	6; 1	6; 2
3	(South Africa) (Latvia)	Liezel Horn / Mariaan de Swardt; Elena Krutko / Larisa Neiland	6; 3	3; 6	6; 3

== Ukraine vs. Denmark ==
Ukraine
2
La Manga Club, Murcia, Spain
20 April 1999
Red clay (outdoors)

Denmark
1

			1	2	3
1	(Ukraine) (Denmark)	Tatiana Perebiynis; Charlotte Aagaard	6; 1	2; 6	6; 4
2	(Ukraine) (Denmark)	Elena Tatarkova; Eva Dyrberg	7^{7} 6^{3}	6; 1
3	(Ukraine) (Denmark)	Natalia Medvedeva / Yulia Mirna; Rikke Faurfelt / Maria Rasmussen	3; 6	4; 6

== South Africa vs. Ukraine ==
South Africa
3
La Manga Club, Murcia, Spain
21 April 1999
Red clay (outdoors)

Ukraine
0

			1	2	3
1	(South Africa) (Ukraine)	Mariaan de Swardt; Natalia Medvedeva	6; 4	6; 3
2	(South Africa) (Ukraine)	Amanda Coetzer; Tatiana Perebiynis	6; 1	6; 2
3	(South Africa) (Ukraine)	Esmé de Villiers / Liezel Horn; Yulia Mirna / Tatiana Perebiynis	7; 5	6; 3

== Latvia vs. Denmark ==
Latvia
2
La Manga Club, Murcia, Spain
21 April 1999
Red clay (outdoors)

Denmark
1

			1	2	3
1	(Latvia) (Denmark)	Katrina Banderę; Charlotte Aagaard	1; 6	2; 6
2	(Latvia) (Denmark)	Larisa Neiland; Eva Dyrberg	6; 2	6; 0
3	(Latvia) (Denmark)	Katrina Banderę / Larisa Neiland; Charlotte Aagaard / Eva Dyrberg	6; 3	6; 4

- Denmark failed to win any ties in the pool, and thus was relegated to Group II in 2000, where they placed first in their pool of six, and thus advanced back to Group I for 2001.

== See also ==
- Fed Cup structure
