= 1999 Fed Cup Europe/Africa Zone Group I – Pool C =

International tennis competition

Group C of the 1999 Fed Cup Europe/Africa Zone Group I was one of four pools in the Europe/Africa Zone Group I of the 1999 Fed Cup. Four teams competed in a round robin competition, with the top two teams advancing to the knockout stage.

	(United Kingdom) GBR	(Bulgaria) BUL	(Finland) FIN	(Federal Republic of Yugoslavia) YUG	RR; W–L	Set; W–L	Game; W–L	Standings
Great Britain		2–1	3–0	3–0	3–0	16–5	119–73	1
Bulgaria	1–2		3–0	3–0	2–1	15–4	104–62	2
Finland	0–3	0–3		2–1	1–2	5–14	64–98	3
Yugoslavia	0–3	0–3	1–2		0–3	3–16	52–116	4

== Great Britain vs. Finland ==
Great Britain
3
La Manga Club, Murcia, Spain
19 April 1999
Red clay (outdoors)

Finland
0

			1	2	3
1	(United Kingdom) (Finland)	Julie Pullin; Hanna-Katri Aalto	6; 4	4; 6	6; 4
2	(United Kingdom) (Finland)	Samantha Smith; Minna Rautajoki	6; 3	6; 0
3	(United Kingdom) (Finland)	Julie Pullin; Nanne Dahlman	6; 0	6; 3

== Bulgaria vs. Yugoslavia ==
Bulgaria
3
La Manga Club, Murcia, Spain
19 April 1999
Red clay (outdoors)

Yugoslavia
0

			1	2	3
1	(Bulgaria) (Federal Republic of Yugoslavia)	Desislava Topalova; Borka Majstorović	6; 2	6; 0
2	(Bulgaria) (Federal Republic of Yugoslavia)	Pavlina Nola; Dragana Zarić	6; 1	6; 2
3	(Bulgaria) (Federal Republic of Yugoslavia)	Pavlina Nola / Desislava Topalova; Branka Bojović / Dragana Zarić	6; 2	6; 2

== Great Britain vs. Yugoslavia ==
Great Britain
3
La Manga Club, Murcia, Spain
20 April 1999
Red clay (outdoors)

Yugoslavia
0

			1	2	3
1	(United Kingdom) (Federal Republic of Yugoslavia)	Joanne Ward; Borka Majstorović	4; 6	6; 2	6; 2
2	(United Kingdom) (Federal Republic of Yugoslavia)	Samantha Smith; Dragana Zarić	6; 4	6; 2
3	(United Kingdom) (Federal Republic of Yugoslavia)	Julie Pullin / Louise Latimer; Branka Bojović / Dragana Zarić	6; 3	6; 2

== Bulgaria vs. Finland ==
Bulgaria
3
La Manga Club, Murcia, Spain
20 April 1999
Red clay (outdoors)

Finland
0

			1	2	3
1	(Bulgaria) (Finland)	Desislava Topalova; Kirsi Lampinen	6; 1	6; 3
2	(Bulgaria) (Finland)	Pavlina Nola; Hanna-Katri Aalto	6; 3	6; 1
3	(Bulgaria) (Finland)	Maria Geznenge / Antoaneta Pandjerova; Nanne Dahlman / Minna Rautajoki	6; 2	6; 4

== Great Britain vs. Bulgaria ==
Great Britain
2
La Manga Club, Murcia, Spain
21 April 1999
Red clay (outdoors)

Bulgaria
1

			1	2	3
1	(United Kingdom) (Bulgaria)	Joanne Ward; Desislava Topalova	6; 2	4; 6	6; 3
2	(United Kingdom) (Bulgaria)	Samantha Smith; Pavlina Nola	6^{4} 7^{7}	4; 6
3	(United Kingdom) (Bulgaria)	Julie Pullin / Joanne Ward; Pavlina Nola / Desislava Topalova	6; 3	7; 5

== Finland vs. Yugoslavia ==
Finland
2
La Manga Club, Murcia, Spain
21 April 1999
Red clay (outdoors)

Yugoslavia
1

			1	2	3
1	(Finland) (Federal Republic of Yugoslavia)	Hanna-Katri Aalto; Borka Majstorović	6; 1	6; 2
2	(Finland) (Federal Republic of Yugoslavia)	Minna Rautajoki; Dragana Zarić	3; 6	2; 6
3	(Finland) (Federal Republic of Yugoslavia)	Hanna-Katri Aalto / Kirsi Lampinen; Branka Bojović / Dragana Zarić	6; 1	7^{10} 6^{8}

- Yugoslavia failed to win any ties in the pool, and thus was relegated to Group II in 2000, where they placed first in their pool of six, and thus advanced back to Group I for 2001.

== See also ==
- Fed Cup structure
