= 2000 Fed Cup Europe/Africa Zone Group I – Pool D =

Group D of the 2000 Fed Cup Europe/Africa Zone Group I was one of four pools in the Europe/Africa Zone Group I of the 2000 Fed Cup. Four teams competed in a round robin competition, with the top team advancing to the knockout stage.

	(Israel) ISR	(Luxembourg) LUX	(Ukraine) UKR	(United Kingdom) GBR	(Finland) FIN	Match; W–L	Set; W–L	Game; W–L	Standings
Israel		2–1	1–2	2–1	3–0	3–1	18–10	138–108	1
Luxembourg	1–2		2–1	2–1	3–0	3–1	17–12	136–114	2
Ukraine	2–1	1–2		1–2	3–0	2–2	16–11	123–106	3
Great Britain	1–2	1–2	2–1		2–1	2–2	13–13	116–106	4
Finland	0–3	0–3	0–3	1–2		0–4	2–16	58–147	5

== Israel vs. Finland ==
Israel
3
La Manga Club, Murcia, Spain
15 May 2000
Red clay (outdoors)

Finland
0

			1	2	3
1	(Israel) (Finland)	Hila Rosen; Kirsi Lampinen	6; 1	6; 3
2	(Israel) (Finland)	Anna Smashnova; Petra Puheloinen	6; 4	6; 2
3	(Israel) (Finland)	Tzipora Obziler / Hila Rosen; Hanna-Katri Aalto / Kirsi Lampinen	6; 1	6; 0

== Ukraine vs. Great Britain ==
Ukraine
1
La Manga Club, Murcia, Spain
15 May 2000
Red clay (outdoors)

Great Britain
2

			1	2	3
1	(Ukraine) (United Kingdom)	Anna Zaporozhanova; Julie Pullin	7^{7} 6^{5}	4; 6	1; 6
2	(Ukraine) (United Kingdom)	Elena Tatarkova; Louise Latimer	6; 2	6; 2
3	(Ukraine) (United Kingdom)	Yuliya Beygelzimer / Anna Zaporozhanova; Julie Pullin / Joanne Ward	4; 6	0; 6

== Israel vs. Luxembourg ==
Israel
2
La Manga Club, Murcia, Spain
16 May 2000
Red clay (outdoors)

Luxembourg
1

			1	2	3
1	(Israel) (Luxembourg)	Tzipora Obziler; Claudine Schaul	6; 2	3; 6	3; 6
2	(Israel) (Luxembourg)	Anna Smashnova; Anne Kremer	7^{7} 6^{4}	6; 4
3	(Israel) (Luxembourg)	Tzipora Obziler / Hila Rosen; Anne Kremer / Claudine Schaul	6^{3} 7^{7}	6; 3	6; 4

== Great Britain vs. Finland ==
Great Britain
2
La Manga Club, Murcia, Spain
16 May 2000
Red clay (outdoors)

Finland
1

			1	2	3
1	(United Kingdom) (Finland)	Julie Pullin; Hanna-Katri Aalto	5; 7	3; 6
2	(United Kingdom) (Finland)	Louise Latimer; Petra Puheloinen	7^{7} 6^{3}	6; 2
3	(United Kingdom) (Finland)	Julie Pullin / Joanne Ward; Hanna-Katri Aalto / Kirsi Lampinen	6; 1	6; 1

== Israel vs. Ukraine ==
Israel
1
La Manga Club, Murcia, Spain
17 May 2000
Red clay (outdoors)

Ukraine
2

			1	2	3
1	(Israel) (Ukraine)	Hila Rosen; Yuliya Beygelzimer	6; 3	4; 6	0; 6
2	(Israel) (Ukraine)	Anna Smashnova; Elena Tatarkova	6; 1	6; 4
3	(Israel) (Ukraine)	Tzipora Obziler / Hila Rosen; Natalia Medvedeva / Elena Tatarkova	4; 6	4; 6

== Luxembourg vs. Finland ==
Luxembourg
3
La Manga Club, Murcia, Spain
17 May 2000
Red clay (outdoors)

Finland
0

			1	2	3
1	(Luxembourg) (Finland)	Claudine Schaul; Hanna-Katri Aalto	6; 0	6; 2
2	(Luxembourg) (Finland)	Anne Kremer; Petra Puheloinen	6; 3	4; 6	6; 1
3	(Luxembourg) (Finland)	Céline Francois / Claudine Schaul; Hanna-Katri Aalto / Kirsi Lampinen	6; 3	2; 6	6; 1

== Israel vs. Great Britain ==
Israel
2
La Manga Club, Murcia, Spain
18 May 2000
Red clay (outdoors)

Great Britain
1

			1	2	3
1	(Israel) (United Kingdom)	Tzipora Obziler; Hannah Collin	1; 6	1; 6
2	(Israel) (United Kingdom)	Anna Smashnova; Louise Latimer	6; 1	6; 3
3	(Israel) (United Kingdom)	Tzipora Obziler / Hila Rosen; Hannah Collin / Julie Pullin	3; 6	6; 4	6; 1

== Luxembourg vs. Ukraine ==
Luxembourg
2
La Manga Club, Murcia, Spain
18 May 2000
Red clay (outdoors)

Ukraine
1

			1	2	3
1	(Luxembourg) (Ukraine)	Claudine Schaul; Anna Zaporozhanova	3; 6	6; 4	6; 1
2	(Luxembourg) (Ukraine)	Anne Kremer; Elena Tatarkova	6; 3	6; 1
3	(Luxembourg) (Ukraine)	Céline Francois / Mandy Minella; Yuliya Beygelzimer / Natalia Medvedeva	0; 6	3; 6

== Luxembourg vs. Great Britain ==
Luxembourg
2
La Manga Club, Murcia, Spain
19 May 2000
Red clay (outdoors)

Great Britain
1

			1	2	3
1	(Luxembourg) (United Kingdom)	Claudine Schaul; Hannah Collin	6; 3	6; 3
2	(Luxembourg) (United Kingdom)	Anne Kremer; Louise Latimer	6; 4	6; 0
3	(Luxembourg) (United Kingdom)	Céline Francois / Mandy Minella; Louise Latimer / Julie Pullin	2; 6	0; 6

== Ukraine vs. Finland ==
Ukraine
3
La Manga Club, Murcia, Spain
19 May 2000
Red clay (outdoors)

Finland
0

			1	2	3
1	(Ukraine) (Finland)	Anna Zaporozhanova; Hanna-Katri Aalto	6; 4	6; 1
2	(Ukraine) (Finland)	Elena Tatarkova; Petra Puheloinen	6; 1	6; 2
3	(Ukraine) (Finland)	Yuliya Beygelzimer / Anna Zaporozhanova; Marianna Keranen / Kirsi Lampinen	6; 0	6; 4

- Finland failed to win any ties in the pool, and thus was relegated to Group II in 2001, where they placed second in their pool of four.

== See also ==
- Fed Cup structure
