= 1998 Fed Cup Europe/Africa Zone Group II – Pool D =

International tennis competition

Group D of the 1998 Fed Cup Europe/Africa Zone Group II was one of five pools in the Europe/Africa zone of the 1998 Fed Cup. Five teams competed in a round robin competition, with the top team advancing to Group I for 1999.

| | (Georgia (country)) GEO | (Estonia) EST | (Republic of Ireland) IRL | (Bosnia and Herzegovina) BIH | (Moldova) MDA | (Iceland) ISL | Match; W–L | Set; W–L | Game; W–L | Standings |
| Georgia | | 2–1 | 3–0 | 2–1 | 3–0 | 3–0 | 5–0 | 26–6 | 180–92 | 1 |
| Estonia | 1–2 | | 1–2 | 2–1 | 2–1 | 3–0 | 3–2 | 21–13 | 161–132 | 2 |
| Ireland | 0–3 | 2–1 | | 1–2 | 2–1 | 3–0 | 3–2 | 17–17 | 154–144 | 3 |
| Bosnia and Herzegovina | 1–2 | 1–2 | 2–1 | | 1–2 | 3–0 | 2–3 | 20–16 | 165–143 | 4 |
| Moldova | 0–3 | 1–2 | 1–2 | 2–1 | | 3–0 | 2–3 | 16–19 | 158–158 | 5 |
| Iceland | 0–3 | 0–3 | 0–3 | 0–3 | 0–3 | | 0–5 | 0–30 | 31–180 | 6 |

== Georgia vs. Moldova ==
Georgia
3
Ali Bey Club, Manavgat, Turkey
5 May 1998
Red clay (outdoors)

Moldova
0

| | | | 1 | 2 | 3 |
|---|---|---|---|---|---|
| 1 | (Georgia (country)) (Moldova) | Margalita Chakhnashvili; Evghenia Ablovatchi | 6; 4 | 6; 4 |
| 2 | (Georgia (country)) (Moldova) | Nino Louarsabishvili; Natalia Volcova | 7; 5 | 0; 6 | 6; 2 |
| 3 | (Georgia (country)) (Moldova) | Margalita Chakhnashvili / Nino Louarsabishvili; Evghenia Ablovatchi / Natalia Volcova | 6; 2 | 6; 4 |

== Estonia vs. Iceland ==
Estonia
3
Ali Bey Club, Manavgat, Turkey
5 May 1998
Red clay (outdoors)

Iceland
0

| | | | 1 | 2 | 3 |
|---|---|---|---|---|---|
| 1 | (Estonia) (Iceland) | Liina Suurvarik; Rakel Petursdóttir | 6; 0 | 6; 1 |
| 2 | (Estonia) (Iceland) | Helen Laupa; Stefanía Stefánsdóttir | 7; 5 | 6; 3 |
| 3 | (Estonia) (Iceland) | Maret Ani / Helene Holter; Rakel Petursdóttir / Stefanía Stefánsdóttir | 6; 1 | 6; 2 |

== Ireland vs. Bosnia and Herzegovina ==
Ireland
1
Ali Bey Club, Manavgat, Turkey
5 May 1998
Red clay (outdoors)

Bosnia and Herzegovina
2

| | | | 1 | 2 | 3 |
|---|---|---|---|---|---|
| 1 | (Republic of Ireland) (Bosnia and Herzegovina) | Lesley O'Halloran; Mervana Jugić-Salkić | 6^{2} 7^{7} | 1; 6 |
| 2 | (Republic of Ireland) (Bosnia and Herzegovina) | Gina Niland; Asja Tankić | 1; 6 | 6^{5} 7^{7} |
| 3 | (Republic of Ireland) (Bosnia and Herzegovina) | Yvonne Flynn / Aoife O'Neill; Harisa Delić / Adisa Salibašić | 4; 6 | 6; 4 | 6; 2 |

== Georgia vs. Bosnia and Herzegovina ==
Georgia
2
Ali Bey Club, Manavgat, Turkey
6 May 1998
Red clay (outdoors)

Bosnia and Herzegovina
1

| | | | 1 | 2 | 3 |
|---|---|---|---|---|---|
| 1 | (Georgia (country)) (Bosnia and Herzegovina) | Margalita Chakhnashvili; Mervana Jugić-Salkić | 4; 6 | 4; 6 |
| 2 | (Georgia (country)) (Bosnia and Herzegovina) | Nino Louarsabishvili; Asja Tankić | 6; 0 | 6; 2 |
| 3 | (Georgia (country)) (Bosnia and Herzegovina) | Margalita Chakhnashvili / Nino Louarsabishvili; Mervana Jugić-Salkić / Asja Tankić | 6; 1 | 6; 2 |

== Estonia vs. Ireland ==
Estonia
1
Ali Bey Club, Manavgat, Turkey
6 May 1998
Red clay (outdoors)

Ireland
2

| | | | 1 | 2 | 3 |
|---|---|---|---|---|---|
| 1 | (Estonia) (Republic of Ireland) | Helene Holter; Lesley O'Halloran | 5; 7 | 1; 6 |
| 2 | (Estonia) (Republic of Ireland) | Liina Suurvarik; Gina Niland | 6; 0 | 2; 6 | 2; 6 |
| 3 | (Estonia) (Republic of Ireland) | Maret Ani / Helen Laupa; Yvonne Flynn / Lesley O'Halloran | 6; 2 | 6; 1 |

== Moldova vs. Iceland ==
Moldova
3
Ali Bey Club, Manavgat, Turkey
6 May 1998
Red clay (outdoors)

Iceland
0

| | | | 1 | 2 | 3 |
|---|---|---|---|---|---|
| 1 | (Moldova) (Iceland) | Elena Arabadji; Rakel Petursdóttir | 6; 2 | 6; 2 |
| 2 | (Moldova) (Iceland) | Evghenia Ablovatchi; Stefanía Stefánsdóttir | 6; 1 | 6; 1 |
| 3 | (Moldova) (Iceland) | Evghenia Ablovatchi / Elena Petrenko; Stella Kristjánsdóttir / Stefanía Stefánsdóttir | 6; 2 | 6; 0 |

== Georgia vs. Iceland ==
Georgia
3
Ali Bey Club, Manavgat, Turkey
7 May 1998
Red clay (outdoors)

Iceland
0

| | | | 1 | 2 | 3 |
|---|---|---|---|---|---|
| 1 | (Georgia (country)) (Iceland) | Margalita Chakhnashvili; Rakel Petursdóttir | 6; 1 | 6; 0 |
| 2 | (Georgia (country)) (Iceland) | Nino Louarsabishvili; Stefanía Stefánsdóttir | 6; 0 | 6; 0 |
| 3 | (Georgia (country)) (Iceland) | Irina Kakoulia / Nino Louarsabishvili; Stella Kristjánsdóttir / Stefanía Stefánsdóttir | 6; 1 | 6; 0 |

== Estonia vs. Bosnia and Herzegovina ==
Estonia
2
Ali Bey Club, Manavgat, Turkey
7 May 1998
Red clay (outdoors)

Bosnia and Herzegovina
1

| | | | 1 | 2 | 3 |
|---|---|---|---|---|---|
| 1 | (Estonia) (Bosnia and Herzegovina) | Helene Holter; Mervana Jugić-Salkić | 6; 4 | 6; 1 |
| 2 | (Estonia) (Bosnia and Herzegovina) | Liina Suurvarik; Asja Tankić | 2; 6 | 7^{7} 6^{5} | 4; 6 |
| 3 | (Estonia) (Bosnia and Herzegovina) | Maret Ani / Helen Laupa; Mervana Jugić-Salkić / Asja Tankić | 1; 6 | 6; 3 | 6; 2 |

== Ireland vs. Moldova ==
Ireland
2
Ali Bey Club, Manavgat, Turkey
8 May 1998
Red clay (outdoors)

Moldova
1

| | | | 1 | 2 | 3 |
|---|---|---|---|---|---|
| 1 | (Republic of Ireland) (Moldova) | Lesley O'Halloran; Evghenia Ablovatchi | 6; 1 | 4; 6 | 7; 5 |
| 2 | (Republic of Ireland) (Moldova) | Gina Niland; Natalia Volcova | 7; 5 | 6; 2 |
| 3 | (Republic of Ireland) (Moldova) | Yvonne Flynn / Aoife O'Neill; Elena Petrenko / Natalia Volcova | 7^{7} 6^{2} | 4; 6 | 5; 7 |

== Georgia vs. Ireland ==
Georgia
3
Ali Bey Club, Manavgat, Turkey
8 May 1998
Red clay (outdoors)

Ireland
0

| | | | 1 | 2 | 3 |
|---|---|---|---|---|---|
| 1 | (Georgia (country)) (Republic of Ireland) | Margalita Chakhnashvili; Lesley O'Halloran | 6; 4 | 6; 2 |
| 2 | (Georgia (country)) (Republic of Ireland) | Nino Louarsabishvili; Gina Niland | 6; 3 | 6; 1 |
| 3 | (Georgia (country)) (Republic of Ireland) | Margalita Chakhnashvili / Nino Louarsabishvili; Yvonne Flynn / Aoife O'Neill | 6; 3 | 6; 1 |

== Estonia vs. Moldova ==
Estonia
2
Ali Bey Club, Manavgat, Turkey
8 May 1998
Red clay (outdoors)

Moldova
1

| | | | 1 | 2 | 3 |
|---|---|---|---|---|---|
| 1 | (Estonia) (Moldova) | Helene Holter; Evghenia Ablovatchi | 6; 2 | 6; 3 |
| 2 | (Estonia) (Moldova) | Helen Laupa; Natalia Volcova | 1; 6 | 2; 6 |
| 3 | (Estonia) (Moldova) | Maret Ani / Liina Suurvarik; Evghenia Ablovatchi / Natalia Volcova | 6; 1 | 6; 1 |

== Bosnia and Herzegovina vs. Iceland ==
Bosnia and Herzegovina
3
Ali Bey Club, Manavgat, Turkey
8 May 1998
Red clay (outdoors)

Iceland
0

| | | | 1 | 2 | 3 |
|---|---|---|---|---|---|
| 1 | (Bosnia and Herzegovina) (Iceland) | Mervana Jugić-Salkić; Rakel Petursdóttir | 6; 1 | 6; 2 |
| 2 | (Bosnia and Herzegovina) (Iceland) | Asja Tankić; Stefanía Stefánsdóttir | 6; 1 | 6; 0 |
| 3 | (Bosnia and Herzegovina) (Iceland) | Harisa Delić / Adisa Salibašić; Stella Kristjánsdóttir / Stefanía Stefánsdóttir | 6; 0 | 6; 1 |

== Georgia vs. Estonia ==
Georgia
2
Ali Bey Club, Manavgat, Turkey
9 May 1998
Red clay (outdoors)

Estonia
1

| | | | 1 | 2 | 3 |
|---|---|---|---|---|---|
| 1 | (Georgia (country)) (Estonia) | Margalita Chakhnashvili; Helene Holter | 5; 7 | 6; 2 | 6; 3 |
| 2 | (Georgia (country)) (Estonia) | Nino Louarsabishvili; Liina Suurvarik | 6; 4 | 6; 3 |
| 3 | (Georgia (country)) (Estonia) | Irina Kakoulia / Nino Louarsabishvili; Maret Ani / Helen Laupa | 4; 6 | 6^{2} 7^{7} |

== Ireland vs. Iceland ==
Ireland
3
Ali Bey Club, Manavgat, Turkey
9 May 1998
Red clay (outdoors)

Iceland
0

| | | | 1 | 2 | 3 |
|---|---|---|---|---|---|
| 1 | (Republic of Ireland) (Iceland) | Yvonne Flynn; Rakel Petursdóttir | 6; 1 | 6; 1 |
| 2 | (Republic of Ireland) (Iceland) | Gina Niland; Stefanía Stefánsdóttir | 6; 0 | 6; 0 |
| 3 | (Republic of Ireland) (Iceland) | Lesley O'Halloran / Aoife O'Neill; Stella Kristjánsdóttir / Stefanía Stefánsdóttir | 6; 1 | 6; 1 |

== Bosnia and Herzegovina vs. Moldova ==
Bosnia and Herzegovina
1
Ali Bey Club, Manavgat, Turkey
9 May 1998
Red clay (outdoors)

Moldova
2

| | | | 1 | 2 | 3 |
|---|---|---|---|---|---|
| 1 | (Bosnia and Herzegovina) (Moldova) | Mervana Jugić-Salkić; Elena Petrenko | 6; 3 | 2; 6 | 6; 1 |
| 2 | (Bosnia and Herzegovina) (Moldova) | Asja Tankić; Natalia Volcova | 6; 2 | 6^{1} 7^{7} | 0; 0 |
| 3 | (Bosnia and Herzegovina) (Moldova) | Mervana Jugić-Salkić / Asja Tankić; Elena Arabadji / Natalia Volcova | 6; 0 | 5; 7 | 3; 6 |

- Georgia placed first in this group and thus advanced to Group I for 1999, where they placed last in their pool of four and was thus relegated back to Group II for 2000.

== See also ==
- Fed Cup structure
