= 1999 Fed Cup Europe/Africa Zone Group I – Pool D =

International tennis competition

Group D of the 1999 Fed Cup Europe/Africa Zone Group I was one of four pools in the Europe/Africa Zone Group I of the 1999 Fed Cup. Four teams competed in a round robin competition, with the top two teams advancing to the knockout stage.

	(Slovenia) SLO	(Luxembourg) LUX	(Poland) POL	(Georgia (country)) GEO	RR; W–L	Set; W–L	Game; W–L	Standings
Slovenia		2–1	2–1	2–1	3–0	13–6	102–64	1
Luxembourg	1–2		2–1	2–1	2–1	11–9	96–87	2
Poland	1–2	1–2		3–0	1–2	10–8	76–85	3
Georgia	1–2	1–2	0–3		0–3	5–16	75–113	4

== Slovenia vs. Georgia ==
Slovenia
2
La Manga Club, Murcia, Spain
19 April 1999
Red clay (outdoors)

Georgia
1

			1	2	3
1	(Slovenia) (Georgia (country))	Tina Križan; Margalita Chakhnashvili	7; 5	6; 0
2	(Slovenia) (Georgia (country))	Katarina Srebotnik; Nino Louarsabishvili	6; 0	6; 2
3	(Slovenia) (Georgia (country))	Tina Hergold / Barbara Mulej; Margalita Chakhnashvili / Nino Louarsabishvili	6; 2	2; 6	3; 6

== Luxembourg vs. Poland ==
Luxembourg
2
La Manga Club, Murcia, Spain
19 April 1999
Red clay (outdoors)

Poland
1

			1	2	3
1	(Luxembourg) (Poland)	Fabienne Thill; Anna Żarska	6; 4	6; 2
2	(Luxembourg) (Poland)	Anne Kremer; Aleksandra Olsza	6; 3	6; 2
3	(Luxembourg) (Poland)	Anne Kremer / Claudine Schaul; Katarzyna Teodorowicz-Lisowska / Anna Żarska	4; 6	2; 6

== Slovenia vs. Luxembourg ==
Slovenia
2
La Manga Club, Murcia, Spain
20 April 1999
Red clay (outdoors)

Luxembourg
1

			1	2	3
1	(Slovenia) (Luxembourg)	Tina Križan; Fabienne Thill	7; 5	6; 1
2	(Slovenia) (Luxembourg)	Katarina Srebotnik; Anne Kremer	6^{3} 7^{7}	2; 6
3	(Slovenia) (Luxembourg)	Tina Križan / Katarina Srebotnik; Anne Kremer / Fabienne Thill	7; 5	6; 2

== Poland vs. Georgia ==
Poland
3
La Manga Club, Murcia, Spain
20 April 1999
Red clay (outdoors)

Georgia
0

			1	2	3
1	(Poland) (Georgia (country))	Anna Żarska; Margalita Chakhnashvili	6; 4	6; 3
2	(Poland) (Georgia (country))	Aleksandra Olsza; Nino Louarsabishvili	6; 4	6; 3
3	(Poland) (Georgia (country))	Katarzyna Teodorowicz-Lisowska / Anna Żarska; Margalita Chakhnashvili / Nino Louarsabishvili	7; 5	6; 2

== Slovenia vs. Poland ==
Slovenia
2
La Manga Club, Murcia, Spain
21 April 1999
Red clay (outdoors)

Poland
1

			1	2	3
1	(Slovenia) (Poland)	Tina Križan; Anna Żarska	4; 6	4; 6
2	(Slovenia) (Poland)	Katarina Srebotnik; Aleksandra Olsza	6; 0	6; 1
3	(Slovenia) (Poland)	Tina Križan / Katarina Srebotnik; Aleksandra Olsza / Katarzyna Teodorowicz-Lisowska	6; 1	6; 2

== Luxembourg vs. Georgia ==
Luxembourg
2
La Manga Club, Murcia, Spain
21 April 1999
Red clay (outdoors)

Georgia
1

			1	2	3
1	(Luxembourg) (Georgia (country))	Fabienne Thill; Margalita Chakhnashvili	3; 6	6; 4	5; 7
2	(Luxembourg) (Georgia (country))	Anne Kremer; Nino Louarsabishvili	6; 0	6; 0
3	(Luxembourg) (Georgia (country))	Anne Kremer / Claudine Schaul; Margalita Chakhnashvili / Nino Louarsabishvili	2; 6	6; 4	6; 3

- Georgia failed to win any ties in the pool, and thus was relegated to Group II in 2000, where they placed second in their

pool of six.

== See also ==
- Fed Cup structure
