= 1998 Fed Cup Europe/Africa Zone Group I – Pool A =

International tennis competition

Group A of the 1998 Fed Cup Europe/Africa Zone Group I was one of four pools in the Europe/Africa Zone Group I of the 1998 Fed Cup. Four teams competed in a round robin competition, with the top two teams advancing to the knockout stage.

	(Belarus) BLR	(Greece) GRE	(Slovenia) SLO	(Israel) ISR	RR; W–L	Set; W–L	Game; W–L	Standings
Belarus		2–1	3–0	2–1	3–0	14–4	97–58	1
Greece	1–2		2–1	2–1	2–1	10–10	85–97	2
Slovenia	0–3	1–2		2–1	1–2	8–13	92–106	3
Israel	1–2	1–2	1–2		0–3	8–13	96–109	4

== Belarus vs. Slovenia ==
Belarus
3
La Manga Club, Murcia, Spain
14 April 1998
Red clay (outdoors)

Slovenia
0

			1	2	3
1	(Belarus) (Slovenia)	Olga Barabanschikova; Tina Pisnik	6; 4	7^{7} 6^{3}
2	(Belarus) (Slovenia)	Natasha Zvereva; Petra Rampre	6; 2	6; 2
3	(Belarus) (Slovenia)	Olga Barabanschikova / Natasha Zvereva; Tina Pisnik / Petra Rampre	6; 1	6; 0

== Greece vs. Israel ==
Greece
2
La Manga Club, Murcia, Spain
14 April 1998
Red clay (outdoors)

Israel
1

			1	2	3
1	(Greece) (Israel)	Eleni Daniilidou; Hila Rosen	2; 6	3; 6
2	(Greece) (Israel)	Christína Papadáki; Anna Smashnova	6; 3	5; 7	6; 4
3	(Greece) (Israel)	Christína Papadáki / Eleni Daniilidou; Tzipora Obziler / Hila Rosen	7; 5	6; 3

== Belarus vs. Israel ==
Belarus
2
La Manga Club, Murcia, Spain
15 April 1998
Red clay (outdoors)

Israel
1

			1	2	3
1	(Belarus) (Israel)	Olga Barabanschikova; Hila Rosen	6; 3	7; 5
2	(Belarus) (Israel)	Natasha Zvereva; Anna Smashnova	6; 2	6; 4
3	(Belarus) (Israel)	Nadejda Ostrovskaya / Tatiana Poutchek; Tzipora Obziler / Hila Rosen	3; 6	1; 6

== Greece vs. Slovenia ==
Greece
2
La Manga Club, Murcia, Spain
15 April 1998
Red clay (outdoors)

Slovenia
1

			1	2	3
1	(Greece) (Slovenia)	Eleni Daniilidou; Tina Pisnik	3; 6	1; 6
2	(Greece) (Slovenia)	Christína Papadáki; Petra Rampre	6; 2	7; 5
3	(Greece) (Slovenia)	Eleni Daniilidou / Christína Papadáki; Maja Matevžič / Tina Pisnik	5; 7	6; 3	6; 3

== Belarus vs. Greece ==
Belarus
2
La Manga Club, Murcia, Spain
16 April 1998
Red clay (outdoors)

Greece
1

			1	2	3
1	(Belarus) (Greece)	Olga Barabanschikova; Eleni Daniilidou	3; 6	4; 6
2	(Belarus) (Greece)	Natasha Zvereva; Christína Papadáki	6; 0	6; 4
3	(Belarus) (Greece)	Olga Barabanschikova / Natasha Zvereva; Eleni Daniilidou / Christína Papadáki	6; 2	6; 1

== Slovenia vs. Israel ==
Slovenia
2
La Manga Club, Murcia, Spain
16 April 1998
Red clay (outdoors)

Israel
1

			1	2	3
1	(Slovenia) (Israel)	Tina Pisnik; Hila Rosen	6; 2	6; 1
2	(Slovenia) (Israel)	Barbara Mulej; Anna Smashnova	6; 4	4; 6	4; 6
3	(Slovenia) (Israel)	Maja Matevžič / Tina Pisnik; Tzipora Obziler / Hila Rosen	6^{4} 7^{7}	7^{7} 6^{2}	6; 4

- Israel failed to win any ties in the pool, and thus was relegated to Group II in 1999, where they placed first in their pool of five, and thus advanced back to Group I for 2000.

== See also ==
- Fed Cup structure
