= 1998 Fed Cup Europe/Africa Zone Group I – Pool D =

International tennis competition

Group D of the 1998 Fed Cup Europe/Africa Zone Group I was one of four pools in the Europe/Africa Zone Group I of the 1998 Fed Cup. Four teams competed in a round robin competition, with the top two teams advancing to the knockout stage.

	(Sweden) SWE	(Ukraine) UKR	(Federal Republic of Yugoslavia) YUG	(Hungary) HUN	RR; W–L	Set; W–L	Game; W–L	Standings
Sweden		2–1	2–1	3–0	3–0	15–6	123–92	1
Ukraine	1–2		3–0	3–0	2–1	14–9	121–106	2
Yugoslavia	1–2	0–3		2–1	1–2	12–13	120–131	3
Hungary	0–3	0–3	1–2		0–3	4–17	88–123	4

== Sweden vs. Hungary ==
Sweden
3
La Manga Club, Murcia, Spain
14 April 1998
Red clay (outdoors)

Hungary
0

			1	2	3
1	(Sweden) (Hungary)	Kristina Triska; Zsófia Gubacsi	6; 4	6; 3
2	(Sweden) (Hungary)	Åsa Carlsson; Petra Gáspár	7^{7} 6^{5}	7; 5
3	(Sweden) (Hungary)	Åsa Carlsson / Kristina Triska; Zsófia Gubacsi / Adrienn Hegedűs	6; 4	6; 3

== Ukraine vs. Yugoslavia ==
Ukraine
3
La Manga Club, Murcia, Spain
14 April 1998
Red clay (outdoors)

Yugoslavia
0

			1	2	3
1	(Ukraine) (Federal Republic of Yugoslavia)	Anna Zaporozhanova; Tatjana Ječmenica	4; 6	6; 1	6; 4
2	(Ukraine) (Federal Republic of Yugoslavia)	Elena Tatarkova; Sandra Naćuk	6; 3	2; 6	8; 6
3	(Ukraine) (Federal Republic of Yugoslavia)	Elena Tatarkova / Anna Zaporozhanova; Sanja Jukić / Dragana Zarić	7; 5	6^{3} 7^{7}	6; 0

== Sweden vs. Yugoslavia ==
Sweden
2
La Manga Club, Murcia, Spain
15 April 1998
Red clay (outdoors)

Yugoslavia
1

			1	2	3
1	(Sweden) (Federal Republic of Yugoslavia)	Kristina Triska; Dragana Zarić	7; 5	5; 7	9; 7
2	(Sweden) (Federal Republic of Yugoslavia)	Åsa Carlsson; Sandra Naćuk	6; 4	3; 6	4; 6
3	(Sweden) (Federal Republic of Yugoslavia)	Åsa Carlsson / Kristina Triska; Sandra Naćuk / Dragana Zarić	5; 7	6; 1	6; 1

== Ukraine vs. Hungary ==
Ukraine
3
La Manga Club, Murcia, Spain
15 April 1998
Red clay (outdoors)

Hungary
0

			1	2	3
1	(Ukraine) (Hungary)	Anna Zaporozhanova; Zsófia Gubacsi	6; 4	5; 7	6; 4
2	(Ukraine) (Hungary)	Elena Tatarkova; Petra Gáspár	6; 1	6; 4
3	(Ukraine) (Hungary)	Tatiana Kovalchuk / Elena Tatarkova; Petra Gáspár / Adrienn Hegedűs	6; 4	6^{8} 7^{10}	6; 3

== Sweden vs. Ukraine ==
Sweden
2
La Manga Club, Murcia, Spain
16 April 1998
Red clay (outdoors)

Ukraine
1

			1	2	3
1	(Sweden) (Ukraine)	Kristina Triska; Anna Zaporozhanova	3; 6	6^{8} 7^{10}
2	(Sweden) (Ukraine)	Åsa Carlsson; Elena Tatarkova	6; 1	6; 1
3	(Sweden) (Ukraine)	Åsa Carlsson / Kristina Triska; Elena Tatarkova / Anna Zaporozhanova	7; 5	6; 3

== Yugoslavia vs. Hungary ==
Yugoslavia
2
La Manga Club, Murcia, Spain
16 April 1998
Red clay (outdoors)

Hungary
1

			1	2	3
1	(Federal Republic of Yugoslavia) (Hungary)	Dragana Zarić; Zsófia Gubacsi	6; 4	2; 6	6; 8
2	(Federal Republic of Yugoslavia) (Hungary)	Sandra Naćuk; Petra Gáspár	6; 1	6; 3
3	(Federal Republic of Yugoslavia) (Hungary)	Tatjana Ječmenica / Dragana Zarić; Petra Gáspár / Zsófia Gubacsi	6; 4	6; 3

- Hungary failed to win any ties in the pool, and thus was relegated to Group II in 1999, where they placed first in their pool of five, and thus advanced back to Group I for 2000.

== See also ==
- Fed Cup structure
