= Maria Pavlidou =

Greek tennis player

- Country (sports): Greece
- Born: 20 January 1978 (age 47)
- Plays: Right-handed
- Prize money: $15,326

Singles
- Career record: 38–54
- Career titles: 0
- Highest ranking: No. 539 (4 February 2002)

Doubles
- Career record: 59–45
- Career titles: 5 ITF
- Highest ranking: No. 359 (8 October 2001)

Maria Pavlidou (Μαρία Παυλίδου, born 20 January 1978) is a Greek former professional tennis player.

A right-handed player from Thessaloniki, Pavlidou spent much of her early career playing college tennis in the United States for the University of Arkansas. She was an All-American in 1999 when she became the first female Arkansas player to reach the quarterfinals of an NCAA singles championships.

Pavlidou represented Greece in the Fed Cup from 2000 to 2003, featuring in a total of five singles and four doubles rubbers. She also competed for Greece at the Mediterranean Games, winning a gold medal in Tunis in 2001, as partner of Eleni Daniilidou in the women's doubles.

== ITF finals ==
=== Singles: 2 (0–2) ===
Outcome	No.	Date	Tournament	Surface	Opponent	Score
Runner-up	1.	20 May 2001	Tel Aviv, Israel	Hard	(Israel) Cheli Bargil	6–3, 4–6, 3–6
Runner-up	2.	30 September 2001	Kastoria, Greece	Clay	(Denmark) Karina Jacobsgaard	1–6, 1–6

=== Doubles: 11 (5–6) ===
Outcome	No.	Date	Tournament	Surface	Partner	Opponents	Score
Winner	1.	28 June 1998	Kavala, Greece	Hard	(Hungary) Réka Vidáts	(Federal Republic of Yugoslavia) Branka Bojović (Greece) Evagelia Roussi	6–1, 6–1
Winner	2.	28 May 2000	Tel Aviv, Israel	Hard	(Romania) Simona Arghire	(Russia) Elena Voropaeva (Russia) Irina Kornienko	6–1, 6–2
Runner-up	1.	8 October 2000	Fiumicino, Italy	Clay	(Greece) Asimina Kaplani	(Slovakia) Martina Babáková (Germany) Scarlett Werner	1–4, 4–1, 2–4
Runner-up	2.	15 October 2000	Ciampino, Italy	Clay	(Greece) Asimina Kaplani	(Romania) Adriana Burz (Romania) Andreea Ehritt-Vanc	2–4, 5–4^{(5)}, 2–4, 1–4
Winner	3.	20 May 2001	Tel Aviv 1, Israel	Hard	(Russia) Irina Kornienko	(Moldova) Evghenia Ablovatchi (Israel) Yevgenia Savranska	6–2, 6–4
Winner	4.	27 May 2001	Tel Aviv 2, Israel	Hard	(Russia) Irina Kornienko	(Australia) Emily Hewson (South Africa) Natasha van der Merwe	w/o
Runner-up	3.	5 August 2001	Istanbul, Turkey	Hard	(Greece) Evagelia Roussi	(Russia) Maria Kondratieva (Russia) Svetlana Mossiakova	2–6, 5–7
Runner-up	4.	26 August 2001	Volos, Greece	Carpet	(Greece) Asimina Kaplani	(Bulgaria) Radoslava Topalova (Bulgaria) Virginia Trifonova	2–6, 6–4, 5–7
Winner	5.	30 September 2001	Kastoria, Greece	Clay	(Greece) Asimina Kaplani	(Turkey) İpek Şenoğlu (Bulgaria) Biljana Pawlowa-Dimitrova	6–3, 7–5
Runner-up	5.	28 July 2002	Algiers, Algeria	Clay	(Greece) Asimina Kaplani	(India) Rushmi Chakravarthi (Greece) Christina Zachariadou	2–6, 2–6
Runner-up	6.	11 August 2002	Bath, Great Britain	Hard	(Greece) Asimina Kaplani	(Australia) Samantha Stosur (Australia) Sarah Stone	4–6, 1–6
