= Réka Vidáts =

Hungarian tennis player (born 1979)

- Country (sports): Hungary
- Born: 19 July 1979 (age 45)
- Prize money: $32,572

Singles
- Career titles: 1 ITF
- Highest ranking: No. 193 (28 July 1997)

Doubles
- Career titles: 2 ITF
- Highest ranking: No. 168 (15 December 1997)

Réka Vidáts (born 19 July 1979) is a Hungarian former professional tennis player.

== Biography ==
As a junior, Vidáts was an Australian Open quarterfinalist and had a win over Martina Hingis, at the Italian Junior Championships in 1994.

Vidáts reached a top ranking of 193 on the professional tour. She twice received a wildcard to compete in the main draw of the Hungarian Ladies Open and featured as a qualifier at the 1995 Indonesia Open. In 1997, she played in Wimbledon qualifiers and appeared in three Fed Cup ties for Hungary.

Based in Marbella, Vidáts now runs an events company.

== ITF finals ==
Legend
$25,000 tournaments
$10,000 tournaments

=== Singles (1–1) ===
Result	No.	Date	Tournament	Surface	Opponent	Score
Win	1.	8 August 1994	Rebecq, Belgium	Clay	(Belgium) Stephanie Devillé	6–2, 3–6, 6–3
Loss	2.	29 August 1994	London, United Kingdom	Grass	(Czech Republic) Denisa Sobotková	6–7, 4–6

=== Doubles (2–4) ===
Result	No.	Date	Tournament	Surface	Partner	Opponents	Score
Loss	1.	12 September 1994	Cluj-Napoca, Romania	Clay	(Hungary) Kati Kocsis	(Czech Republic) Petra Filipová (Czech Republic) Olga Vymetálková	6–4, 2–6, 4–6
Loss	2.	23 September 1995	Sofia, Bulgaria	Clay	(Bulgaria) Lubomira Bacheva	(Argentina) Geraldine Aizenberg (Argentina) Laura Montalvo	2–6, 2–6
Win	3.	19 August 1996	Kyiv, Ukraine	Clay	(Sweden) Anna-Karin Svensson	(Ukraine) Natalia Medvedeva (Ukraine) Anna Zaporozhanova	7–5, 6–3
Loss	4.	27 July 1997	Rostock, Germany	Clay	(Australia) Renee Reid	(Bulgaria) Svetlana Krivencheva (Bulgaria) Pavlina Nola	w/o
Loss	5.	10 November 1997	Mount Gambier, Australia	Hard	(Australia) Renee Reid	(Australia) Catherine Barclay (South Korea) Kim Eun-ha	3–6, 2–6
Win	6.	22 June 1998	Kavala, Greece	Hard	(Greece) Maria Pavlidou	(Serbia and Montenegro) Branka Bojović (Greece) Evagelia Roussi	6–1, 6–1

== See also ==
- List of Hungary Fed Cup team representatives
