= 2000 Fed Cup Europe/Africa Zone Group II – Pool A =

International tennis competition

Group A of the 2000 Fed Cup Europe/Africa Zone Group II was one of four pools in the Europe/Africa zone of the 2000 Fed Cup. Five teams competed in a round robin competition, with the top team advancing to Group I for 2001.

	(North Macedonia) MKD	(Republic of Ireland) IRL	(Malta) MLT	(Mauritius) MRI	(Kenya) KEN	Match; W–L	Set; W–L	Game; W–L	Standings
Macedonia		2–1	2–1	3–0	3–0	3–1	20–5	131–68	1
Ireland	1–2		2–1	3–0	3–0	3–1	18–6	130–69	2
Malta	1–2	1–2		3–0	3–0	2–2	17–8	134–81	3
Mauritius	0–3	0–3	0–3		1–0	2–2	2–18	36–143	4
Kenya	0–3	0–3	0–3	0–1		0–4	0–20	21–122	5

== Macedonia vs. Mauritius ==
Macedonia
3
Estoril T.C., Estoril, Portugal
28 March 2000
Red clay (outdoors)

Mauritius
0

			1	2	3
1	(North Macedonia) (Mauritius)	Biljana Dimovska; Lisa Gebert	6; 0	6; 1
2	(North Macedonia) (Mauritius)	Marina Lazarovska; Corinne Ng Tung Hing	6; 0	6; 1
3	(North Macedonia) (Mauritius)	Ana Buraku / Elena Manevska; Alice Lamport / Emma Taikie	6; 4	6; 2

== Ireland vs. Malta ==
Ireland
2
Estoril T.C., Estoril, Portugal
28 March 2000
Red clay (outdoors)

Malta
1

			1	2	3
1	(Republic of Ireland) (Malta)	Kelly Liggan; Lisa Camenzuli	7; 5	6; 3
2	(Republic of Ireland) (Malta)	Yvonne Doyle; Sarah Wetz	6; 4	6; 4
3	(Republic of Ireland) (Malta)	Gina Niland / Elsa O'Riain; Lisa Camenzuli / Carol Cassar-Torreggiani	3; 6	5; 7

== Macedonia vs. Malta ==
Macedonia
3
Estoril T.C., Estoril, Portugal
29 March 2000
Red clay (outdoors)

Malta
0

			1	2	3
1	(North Macedonia) (Malta)	Biljana Dimovska; Lisa Camenzuli	6; 4	4; 6	7; 5
2	(North Macedonia) (Malta)	Marina Lazarovska; Helen Asciak	7; 5	6; 0
3	(North Macedonia) (Malta)	Ana Buraku / Elena Manevska; Lisa Camenzuli / Carol Cassar-Torreggiani	0; 6	1; 6

== Ireland vs. Kenya ==
Ireland
3
Estoril T.C., Estoril, Portugal
29 March 2000
Red clay (outdoors)

Kenya
0

			1	2	3
1	(Republic of Ireland) (Kenya)	Kelly Liggan; Esther Mbugua	6; 0	6; 1
2	(Republic of Ireland) (Kenya)	Yvonne Doyle; Evelyn Otula	6; 0	6; 1
3	(Republic of Ireland) (Kenya)	Gina Niland / Elsa O'Riain; Christine Lukalo / Florence Mbugua	6; 2	6; 1

== Ireland vs. Mauritius ==
Ireland
3
Estoril T.C., Estoril, Portugal
30 March 2000
Red clay (outdoors)

Mauritius
0

			1	2	3
1	(Republic of Ireland) (Mauritius)	Kelly Liggan; Lisa Gebert	6; 1	6; 2
2	(Republic of Ireland) (Mauritius)	Yvonne Doyle; Corinne Ng Tung Hing	6; 2	6; 2
3	(Republic of Ireland) (Mauritius)	Gina Niland / Elsa O'Riain; Alice Lamport / Emma Taikie	6; 0	6; 0

== Malta vs. Kenya ==
Malta
3
Estoril T.C., Estoril, Portugal
30 March 2000
Red clay (outdoors)

Kenya
0

			1	2	3
1	(Malta) (Kenya)	Lisa Camenzuli; Christine Lukalo	6; 1	6; 1
2	(Malta) (Kenya)	Carol Cassar-Torreggiani; Evelyn Otula	6; 1	6; 2
3	(Malta) (Kenya)	Helen Asciak / Sarah Wetz; Christine Lukalo / Florence Mbugua	6; 4	6; 1

== Macedonia vs. Kenya ==
Macedonia
3
Estoril T.C., Estoril, Portugal
31 March 2000
Red clay (outdoors)

Kenya
0

			1	2	3
1	(North Macedonia) (Kenya)	Biljana Dimovska; Esther Mbugua	6; 0	6; 1
2	(North Macedonia) (Kenya)	Marina Lazarovska; Evelyn Otula	6; 0	6; 0
3	(North Macedonia) (Kenya)	Biljana Dimovska / Marina Lazarovska; Christine Lukalo / Florence Mbugua	6; 0	6; 2

== Malta vs. Mauritius ==
Malta
3
Estoril T.C., Estoril, Portugal
31 March 2000
Red clay (outdoors)

Mauritius
0

			1	2	3
1	(Malta) (Mauritius)	Lisa Camenzuli; Lisa Gebert	6; 1	6; 0
2	(Malta) (Mauritius)	Helen Asciak; Alice Lamport	7^{7} 6^{4}	6; 0
3	(Malta) (Mauritius)	Lisa Camenzuli / Carol Cassar-Torreggiani; Lisa Gebert / Alice Lamport	6; 0	6; 0

== Macedonia vs. Ireland ==
Macedonia
3
Estoril T.C., Estoril, Portugal
1 April 2000
Red clay (outdoors)

Ireland
0

			1	2	3
1	(North Macedonia) (Republic of Ireland)	Biljana Dimovska; Kelly Liggan	2; 6	2; 6
2	(North Macedonia) (Republic of Ireland)	Marina Lazarovska; Yvonne Doyle	6; 2	6; 4
3	(North Macedonia) (Republic of Ireland)	Biljana Dimovska / Marina Lazarovska; Yvonne Doyle / Kelly Liggan	6; 3	6; 2

== Mauritius vs. Kenya ==
Mauritius
1
Estoril T.C., Estoril, Portugal
1 April 2000
Red clay (outdoors)

Kenya
0

			1	2	3
1	(Mauritius) (Kenya)	Alice Lamport; Esther Mbugua	6; 0	6; 2
2	(Mauritius) (Kenya)	Corinne Ng Tung Hing; Evelyn Otula	2; 1			not completed
3	(Mauritius) (Kenya)					not played

- Macedonia placed first in this group and thus advanced to Group I for 2001, where they placed last in their pool of four, and was thus relegated back to Group II for 2002.

== See also ==
- Fed Cup structure
