= 2003 Fed Cup World Group play-offs =

Part of tennis tournament

The 2003 World Group play-offs decided which nations featured in World Group in the 2004 Fed Cup. The play-off winners went on to feature in World Group in 2004, while the losing nations joined Zonal Competition for 2004.

== Argentina vs. Hungary ==
Argentina
3
Mayling Club de Campo, Pilar, Argentina
19–20 July 2003
Red clay (outdoors)

Hungary
2

			1	2	3
1	(Argentina) (Hungary)	Clarisa Fernández; Rita Kuti-Kis	6; 3	6; 1
2	(Argentina) (Hungary)	Natalia Gussoni; Petra Mandula	3; 6	4; 6
3	(Argentina) (Hungary)	Clarisa Fernández; Petra Mandula	6; 2	7; 5
4	(Argentina) (Hungary)	Natalia Gussoni; Katalin Marosi	6; 2	6; 3
5	(Argentina) (Hungary)	Natalia Gussoni / María Emilia Salerni; Petra Mandula / Katalin Marosi	6^{4} 7^{7}	2; 6

== Australia vs. Colombia ==
Australia
3
WIN Sports Centre, Wollongong, Australia
19–20 July 2003
Decoturf II (indoors)

Colombia
2

			1	2	3
1	(Australia) (Colombia)	Samantha Stosur; Fabiola Zuluaga	6; 4	1; 6	4; 6
2	(Australia) (Colombia)	Alicia Molik; Catalina Castaño	7^{8} 6^{6}	4; 6	6; 2
3	(Australia) (Colombia)	Alicia Molik; Fabiola Zuluaga	2; 6	7^{7} 6^{4}	8; 10
4	(Australia) (Colombia)	Nicole Pratt; Catalina Castaño	6; 3	7^{7} 6^{3}
5	(Australia) (Colombia)	Alicia Molik / Rennae Stubbs; Catalina Castaño / Fabiola Zuluaga	7^{7} 6^{5}	6; 2

== Austria vs. Canada ==
Austria
4
Tennis und Sportcenter Neudörfl, Neudörfl, Austria
19–20 July 2003
Red clay (indoors)

Canada
1

			1	2	3
1	(Austria) (Canada)	Patricia Wartusch; Maureen Drake	6; 3	6^{3} 7^{7}	6; 2
2	(Austria) (Canada)	Barbara Schett; Marie-Ève Pelletier	3; 6	6; 2	6; 4
3	(Austria) (Canada)	Barbara Schett; Maureen Drake	7; 5	2; 6	6; 1
4	(Austria) (Canada)	Patricia Wartusch; Marie-Ève Pelletier	6^{3} 7^{7}	6; 3	6; 3
5	(Austria) (Canada)	Sybille Bammer / Evelyn Fauth; Sonya Jeyaseelan / Vanessa Webb	5; 7	2; 6

== Croatia vs. Brazil ==
Croatia
4
Teniski Klub Varteks, Varaždin, Croatia
19–20 July 2003
Red clay (outdoors)

Brazil
1

			1	2	3
1	(Croatia) (Brazil)	Silvija Talaja; Bruna Colósio	7^{7} 6^{5}	6; 3
2	(Croatia) (Brazil)	Karolina Šprem; Joana Cortez	6; 1	6; 0
3	(Croatia) (Brazil)	Karolina Šprem; Bruna Colósio	6; 3	3; 6	1; 6
4	(Croatia) (Brazil)	Silvija Talaja; Joana Cortez	7; 5	6; 2
5	(Croatia) (Brazil)	Jelena Kostanić / Karolina Šprem; Bruna Colósio / Joana Cortez	6; 2	6; 3

== South Africa vs. Czech Republic ==
South Africa
1
Westridge Park, Durban, South Africa
19–20 July 2003
Red clay (outdoors)

Czech Republic
4

			1	2	3
1	(South Africa) (Czech Republic)	Natalie Grandin; Klára Koukalová	5; 7	3; 6
2	(South Africa) (Czech Republic)	Amanda Coetzer; Barbora Strýcová	3; 6	6; 2	6; 2
3	(South Africa) (Czech Republic)	Amanda Coetzer; Klára Koukalová	4; 6	5; 7
4	(South Africa) (Czech Republic)	Chanelle Scheepers; Barbora Strýcová	4; 6	6^{5} 7^{7}
5	(South Africa) (Czech Republic)	Natalie Grandin / Nicole Rencken; Klára Koukalová / Barbora Strýcová	6; 2	4; 6	1; 6

== Indonesia vs. Germany ==
Indonesia
2
Gelora Bung Karno Tennis Stadium, Jakarta, Indonesia
19–20 July 2003
Hard (outdoors)

Germany
3

			1	2	3
1	(Indonesia) (Germany)	Wynne Prakusya; Anca Barna	6; 4	0; 6	4; 6
2	(Indonesia) (Germany)	Angelique Widjaja; Barbara Rittner	4; 6	1; 6
3	(Indonesia) (Germany)	Angelique Widjaja; Anca Barna	6; 3	6; 1
4	(Indonesia) (Germany)	Wynne Prakusya; Barbara Rittner	4; 6	6; 2	3; 6
5	(Indonesia) (Germany)	Wynne Prakusya / Angelique Widjaja; Vanessa Henke / Angelika Rösch	6; 2	6; 2

== Japan vs. Sweden ==
Japan
4
DEAI Dome at Gifu Memorial Center, Gifu, Japan
19–20 July 2003
Supreme carpet (indoors)

Sweden
1

			1	2	3
1	(Japan) (Sweden)	Shinobu Asagoe; Sofia Arvidsson	6; 3	7; 5
2	(Japan) (Sweden)	Ai Sugiyama; Hanna Nooni	6; 3	6; 4
3	(Japan) (Sweden)	Ai Sugiyama; Sofia Arvidsson	5; 7	1; 6
4	(Japan) (Sweden)	Shinobu Asagoe; Hanna Nooni	6; 3	7^{8} 6^{6}
5	(Japan) (Sweden)	Akiko Morigami / Saori Obata; Sofia Arvidsson / Hanna Nooni	6; 3	6; 2

== Switzerland vs. Israel ==
Switzerland
4
Tennis Club Winterthur, Winterthur, Switzerland
19–20 July 2003
Red clay (outdoors)

Israel
1

			1	2	3
1	(Switzerland) (Israel)	Patty Schnyder; Tzipora Obziler	6; 1	7; 5
2	(Switzerland) (Israel)	Myriam Casanova; Anna Smashnova	6; 3	6; 2
3	(Switzerland) (Israel)	Patty Schnyder; Anna Smashnova	6; 3	6; 3
4	(Switzerland) (Israel)	Emmanuelle Gagliardi; Tzipora Obziler	3; 6	5; 7
5	(Switzerland) (Israel)	Myriam Casanova / Patty Schnyder; Tzipora Obziler / Shahar Pe'er	6; 1	6; 1

== See also ==
- Fed Cup structure
