= Adriana Basarić =

Bosnia and Herzegovina tennis player

- Full name: Adriana Basarić-Çopur
- Country (sports): Bosnia and Herzegovina
- Born: 17 February 1982 (age 43)
- Plays: Right-handed
- Prize money: $16,698

Singles
- Career record: 70–52
- Career titles: 1 ITF
- Highest ranking: No. 323 (10 June 2002)

Doubles
- Career record: 2–6
- Highest ranking: No. 984 (15 July 2002)

Adriana Basarić-Çopur (born 17 February 1982) is a Bosnia and Herzegovina former professional tennis player.

Basarić had a career high singles ranking of 323 in the world and won one title on ITF Women's Circuit, which came in her hometown of Mostar in 2001, over Karolina Šprem in the final.

In Fed Cup tennis, Basarić represented Bosnia and Herzegovina in a total of six ties, debuting as a 17-year old in 1999. After appearing in four ties in 1999 she didn't return to the team until 2003, when he played in a further two ties. She won a total of three singles and four doubles rubbers.

== ITF finals ==
=== Singles: 4 (1–3) ===
Outcome	No.	Date	Tournament	Surface	Opponent	Score
Runner-up	1.	3 September 2000	ITF Mostar, Bosnia and Herzegovina	Clay	(Croatia) Maja Palaveršić	3–6, 5–7
Winner	1.	2 September 2001	ITF Mostar, Bosnia and Herzegovina	Clay	(Croatia) Karolina Šprem	6–4, 6–3
Runner-up	2.	2 December 2001	ITF Mallorca, Spain	Clay	(Belgium) Caroline Maes	6–2, 1–6, 5–7
Runner-up	3.	2 May 2004	ITF Mostar, Bosnia and Herzegovina	Clay	(Bosnia and Herzegovina) Dijana Stojić	4–6, 3–6
