= Raluca Sandu =

Romanian tennis player

- Country (sports): Romania
- Residence: Monaco, Monaco
- Born: 3 February 1980 (age 45); Bucharest, Socialist Republic of Romania
- Height: 1.77 m (5 ft 10 in)
- Turned pro: 1994
- Retired: 2004
- Plays: Right-handed
- Prize money: $157,333

Singles
- Career record: 187–154
- Career titles: 4 ITF
- Highest ranking: No. 68 (18 January 1999)

Grand Slam singles results
- Australian Open: 2R (1999)
- French Open: 3R (1999)
- US Open: 2R (1998)

Doubles
- Career record: 32–59
- Career titles: 1 ITF
- Highest ranking: No. 228 (13 September 1999)

Grand Slam mixed doubles results
- French Open: 1R (1999)

Team competitions
- Fed Cup: 7–9

Raluca Sandu (born 3 February 1980) is a Romanian former tennis player and professional padel player.

On 18 January 1999, she reached her highest WTA singles ranking of 68 whilst her best doubles ranking was 228 on 13 September 1999.

Raluca turned pro at the age of 15 and reached WTA top 100 by the time she was 17 years old. She was also ranked top 10 in the world ITF juniors ranking, reaching the semifinals at the 1995 US Open. Raluca was forced to retire early due to shoulder injury (2004).

== Personal ==
Raluca is the daughter of former Romanian football player and former president of the Romanian Football Federation, Mircea Sandu and her late mother, Simona Arghir former handball player and captain of Romanian national handball team. Raluca has one more sibling, older brother Dan Mircea. In her youth, she was dating former world No. 1, Carlos Moya, for two years.

== ITF Circuit finals ==
Legend
$100,000 tournaments
$75,000 tournaments
$50,000 tournaments
$25,000 tournaments
$10,000 tournaments

=== Singles (4–7) ===
Result	No.	Date	Tournament	Surface	Opponent	Score
Win	1.	24 April 1995	Bari, Italy	Clay	(Italy) Stefania Pifferi	6–2, 6–4
Loss	2.	7 August 1995	Istanbul, Turkey	Hard	(Turkey) Gülberk Gültekin	3–6, 1–6
Win	3.	18 September 1995	Cluj-Napoca, Romania	Clay	(Hungary) Katalin Marosi	6–3, 6–3
Win	4.	10 February 1996	Sunderland, UK	Hard	(United Kingdom) Samantha Smith	4–6, 7–5, 6–4
Loss	5.	21 July 1996	Darmstadt, Germany	Clay	(Germany) Julia Abe	2–6, 3–6
Loss	6.	17 November 1996	Bad Gögging, Germany	Carpet (i)	(India) Nirupama Vaidyanathan	4–6, 1–6
Loss	7.	2 March 1997	Bushey, UK	Carpet (i)	(Belarus) Olga Barabanschikova	1–6, 6–7
Loss	8.	20 July 1997	Darmstadt, Germany	Clay	(Bulgaria) Pavlina Stoyanova	4–6, 1–6
Loss	9.	12 April 1998	Estoril, Portugal	Clay	(Austria) Barbara Schwartz	2–6, 3–6
Win	10.	26 July 1998	Valladolid, Spain	Hard	(Hungary) Rita Kuti-Kis	6–3, 6–3
Loss	11.	24 June 2001	Gorizia, Italy	Clay	(Spain) Eva Bes-Ostáriz	0–6, 6–1, 3–6

=== Doubles (1–2) ===
Result	No.	Date	Tournament	Surface	Partner	Opponents	Score
Loss	1.	7 August 1995	Istanbul, Turkey	Hard	(Romania) Alice Pirsu	(Turkey) Gülberk Gültekin (United States) Selin Nassi Tekikbas	2–6, 2–6
Win	2.	20 June 1999	Marseille, France	Clay	(Spain) Gisela Riera	(Czech Republic) Eva Martincová (Czech Republic) Lenka Němečková	6–4, 7–6
Loss	3.	1 August 1999	Bytom, Poland	Clay	(Spain) Gisela Riera	(Spain) Eva Bes-Ostáriz (Poland) Magdalena Grzybowska	4–6, 5–7

== Head-to-head records ==
Players who have been ranked world No. 1 are in boldface.

- Magdalena Maleeva 1-0
- Anna Kournikova 1-1
- Elena Dementieva 1-0
- **Amélie Mauresmo** 1–0
- Svetlana Kuznetsova 1-0
- Patty Schnyder 0–1
- **Serena Williams** 0–1
- Conchita Martínez Granados 1-0
- Jelena Kostanić 0–1
- Elena Vesnina 1–0
