= Alice Pirsu =

Romanian tennis player

- Country (sports): Romania
- Born: 16 May 1979 (age 45); Bucharest, Romania
- Prize money: $26,301

Singles
- Career record: 78–70
- Career titles: 1 ITF
- Highest ranking: No. 200 (20 July 1998)

Doubles
- Career record: 47–46
- Career titles: 1 ITF
- Highest ranking: No. 223 (20 July 1998)

Team competitions
- Fed Cup: 4–6

Alice Pirsu (born 16 May 1979) is a former professional tennis player from Romania.

== Biography ==
Born in Bucharest, Pirsu competed on the professional tour in the 1990s. As a junior, she had a top ranking of 24 and reached the second round at Wimbledon.

Beginning on the ITF Circuit in 1994, she won her biggest title at Athens in 1997, defeating Evgenia Kulikovskaya in the final of a $25k tournament. She played five singles and five doubles rubbers for Romania's Fed Cup team across 1997 and 1998, in a total of seven ties. In 1998, her final year on tour, she reached her best singles ranking of 200 in the world.

Pirsu left the professional tennis circuit to attend the University of Pennsylvania. While studying for her economics degree she was a co-captain of the university's tennis team, the Penn Quakers, earning the Ivy League Player of the Year award in both 2002 and 2003. She made the final eight of the 2003 NCAA Division I Women's Tennis Championships, becoming the first Quakers player to have done so.

She is now based in New York and runs an interior design company in Pelham.

== ITF finals ==
=== Singles (1–3) ===
Legend
$25,000 tournaments
$10,000 tournaments

Result	No.	Date	Tournament	Surface	Opponent	Score
Winner	1.	31 August 1997	ITF Athens, Greece	Clay	(Russia) Evgenia Kulikovskaya	4–6, 7–5, 6–3
Loss	2.	7 September 1997	ITF Cluj, Romania	Clay	(Bulgaria) Desislava Topalova	3–6, 7–5, 3–6
Loss	3.	12 October 1997	ITF Thessaloniki, Greece	Hard	(Bulgaria) Antoaneta Pandjerova	2–6, 2–6
Loss	4.	20 September 1998	ITF Constanta, Romania	Clay	(Ukraine) Anna Zaporozhanova	6–7, 1–6

=== Doubles (1–6) ===
Result	No.	Date	Tournament	Surface	Partner	Opponents	Score
Loss	1.	7 August 1995	ITF İstanbul, Turkey	Hard	(Romania) Raluca Sandu	(Turkey) Gülberk Gültekin (United States) Selin Nassi Tekikbas	2–6, 2–6
Winner	2.	24 June 1996	ITF Maribor, Slovenia	Clay	(Romania) Alida Gallovits	(Hungary) Kira Nagy (Hungary) Andrea Noszály	6–4, 7–5
Loss	3.	18 August 1996	ITF İstanbul, Turkey	Hard	(Malaysia) Khoo Chin-bee	(Turkey) İpek Şenoğlu (Bulgaria) Desislava Topalova	1–6, 4–6
Loss	4.	28 July 1997	ITF Horb, Germany	Clay	(Romania) Magda Mihalache	(Germany) Julia Abe (Australia) Renee Reid	3–6, 3–6
Loss	5.	1 September 1997	ITF Cluj-Napoca, Romania	Clay	(Romania) Magda Mihalache	(Czech Republic) Olga Vymetálková (Czech Republic) Blanka Kumbárová	6–7^{(3)}, 6–4, 4–6
Loss	6.	6 April 1998	ITF Athens, Greece	Clay	(Romania) Andreea Ehritt-Vanc	(Italy) Alice Canepa (Italy) Tatiana Garbin	7–5, 2–6, 4–6
Loss	7.	14 September 1998	ITF Constanța, Romania	Hard	(Georgia (country)) Nino Louarsabishvili	(Netherlands) Debby Haak (Netherlands) Jolanda Mens	3–6, 6–7^{(5)}
