= Evghenia Ablovatchi =

Moldovan tennis player

- Country (sports): Moldova
- Born: 28 October 1981 (age 43)
- Prize money: $12,157

Singles
- Career record: 24–53
- Highest ranking: No. 552 (24 September 2001)

Doubles
- Career record: 34–41
- Career titles: 1 ITF
- Highest ranking: No. 350 (27 August 2001)

Evghenia Ablovatchi (born 28 October 1981) is a Moldovan former professional tennis player.

Born in 1981, Ablovatchi trained as a junior in the Netherlands and played on the professional tour for three years, reaching a career high singles ranking of 552 in the world. She was ranked as high as 350 in doubles and won an ITF doubles title in Le Touquet in 2002.

Ablovatchi featured in eight Fed Cup ties for Moldova, four in 1998 and four in 1999. She won a total of seven rubbers, four of which came in singles.

== ITF finals ==
=== Doubles: 3 (1–2) ===
Result	No.	Date	Tournament	Surface	Partner	Opponents	Score
Loss	1.	20 May 2001	Tel Aviv, Israel	Hard	(Israel) Yevgenia Savranska	(Russia) Irina Kornienko (Greece) Maria Pavlidou	2–6, 4–6
Loss	2.	24 June 2001	Algiers, Algeria	Clay	(Slovakia) Lenka Tvarošková	(South Africa) Chanelle Scheepers (South Africa) Karin Vermeulen	6–7^{(2–7)}, 4–6
Win	1.	21 July 2002	Le Touquet, France	Clay	(Israel) Yevgenia Savranska	(France) Audrey Hernandez (France) Amandine Singla	6–2, 6–3
