= Evagelia Roussi =

Greek tennis player

- Country (sports): Greece
- Born: 16 May 1979 (age 45)
- Prize money: $14,565

Singles
- Career record: 49–54
- Highest ranking: No. 433 (16 October 2000)

Doubles
- Career record: 27–40
- Career titles: 3 ITF
- Highest ranking: No. 472 (24 May 1999)

Evagelia Roussi (born 16 May 1979) is a Greek former professional tennis player.

Roussi featured in a total of nine Fed Cup ties for Greece between 1999 and 2001, winning three singles and one doubles rubber. One of her singles wins came against top 100 player Mariaan de Swardt of South Africa in 2000.

== ITF finals ==
=== Singles (0–1) ===
Outcome	Date	Tournament	Surface	Opponent	Score
Runner-up	16 July 2000	Brussels, Belgium	Clay	(France) Anne-Laure Heitz	6–7^{(4–7)}, 1–6

=== Doubles (3–2) ===
Outcome	No.	Date	Tournament	Surface	Partner	Opponents	Score
Runner-up	1.	28 June 1998	Kavala, Greece	Hard	(Federal Republic of Yugoslavia) Branka Bojović	(Hungary) Réka Vidáts (Greece) Maria Pavlidou	1–6, 1–6
Winner	1.	30 August 1998	Skiathos, Greece	Carpet	(Greece) Eleni Daniilidou	(North Macedonia) Marina Lazarovska (Belarus) Tatiana Poutchek	3–6, 6–4, 6–2
Winner	2.	6 September 1998	Xanthi, Greece	Hard	(Greece) Eleni Daniilidou	(Federal Republic of Yugoslavia) Dragana Ilić (Federal Republic of Yugoslavia) Ljiljana Nanušević	6–0, 6–3
Winner	3.	27 August 2000	Kastoria, Greece	Carpet	(Greece) Eleni Daniilidou	(Austria) Sandra Klemenschits (Austria) Daniela Klemenschits	6–3, 6–4
Runner-up	2.	5 August 2001	Istanbul, Turkey	Hard	(Greece) Maria Pavlidou	(Russia) Maria Kondratieva (Russia) Svetlana Mossiakova	2–6, 5–7
