= Hungary Billie Jean King Cup team =

Hungarian national women's tennis team

Hungary
- Captain: Gabor Juhasz
- ITF ranking: 25 ▼ (16 November 2022)
- Colors: red & white
- First year: 1963
- Years played: 45
- Ties played (W–L): 154 (83–71)
- Years in World Group: 18 (8–17)
- Best finish: World Group QF (1963, 1985)
- Most total wins: Petra Mandula (28–8); Réka Luca Jani (28–18)
- Most singles wins: Anna Földényi (16–3)
- Most doubles wins: Petra Mandula (17–3)
- Best doubles team: Réka Szikszay / Andrea Temesvári (5–0); Tímea Babos / Réka Luca Jani (5–2)
- Most ties played: Réka Luca Jani (36)
- Most years played: Andrea Temesvári; Réka Luca Jani (10)

The Hungary women's national tennis team represents Hungary in Billie Jean King Cup tennis competition and are governed by the Hungarian Tennis Association (Magyar Tenisz Szövetség). They currently compete in the Europe/Africa Zone of Group I.

== History ==
Hungary competed in its first Fed Cup in 1963. Their best result was reaching the quarterfinals in 1963 and 1985.

== Players ==
Note: players in bold are part of the 2019 Fed Cup team.

Name	DOB	Years	First	Last	Ties	Win/Loss		
Name	DOB	Years	First	Last	Ties	Sin	Dou	Tot
Gréta Arn	13 April 1979	4	2008	2013	13	6–5	3–2	9–7
Tímea Babos	10 May 1993	7	2011	2025	18	11–6	11–3	22–9
Klára Bardóczy	15 September 1937	2	1963	1966	4	1–1	1–3	2–4
Csilla Bartos-Cserepy	29 March 1966	5	1981	1990	17	10–6	7–7	17–13
Lucia Batta	2 March 1991	1	2007	2007	1	0–1	0–0	0–1
**Anna Bondár**	27 May 1997	4	2015	2019	10	3–4	2–0	5–4
Katalin Borka	28 June 1948	1	1969	1969	1	0–1	0–1	0–2
Zsófia Broszmann	27 June 1935	1	1963	1963	2	1–1	1–1	2–2
Ágnes Bukta	29 October 1993	1	2017	2017	2	1–0	1–0	2–0
Vaszilisza Bulgakova	25 February 1993	1	2012	2012	0	0–0	0–0	0–0
Virág Csurgó	10 November 1972	5	1988	1996	13	0–5	6–5	6–10
Melinda Czink	22 October 1982	3	2003	2006	10	4–6	2–0	6–6
Annamária Földényi	22 August 1974	5	1992	2000	21	16–3	3–2	19–5
**Dalma Gálfi**	13 August 1998	5	2015	2019	15	4–6	4–3	8–9
Petra Gáspár	13 February 1977	2	1994	1998	6	1–5	0–2	1–7
Zsófia Gubacsi	6 April 1981	6	1999	2007	18	5–7	7–6	12–13
Kata Györke	11 September 1975	2	1992	1993	5	0–2	3–2	3–4
Adrienn Hegedűs	26 December 1977	1	1998	1998	2	0–0	0–2	0–2
**Réka-Luca Jani**	31 July 1991	9	2010	2019	30	11–10	12–7	23–17
Anikó Kapros	11 November 1983	4	2001	2010	8	1–3	2–3	3–6
Beatrix Klein	19 January 1953	2	1975	1976	7	5–2	2–1	7–3
Zsuzsa Körmöczy	25 August 1924	1	1963	1963	2	1–1	0–0	1–1
Rita Kuti Kis	13 February 1978	6	1994	2003	15	10–7	2–2	12–9
Petra Mandula	17 January 1978	8	1994	2003	24	11–5	17–3	28–8
Katalin Marosi	12 November 1979	8	1997	2013	21	4–5	11–8	15–13
Ágnes Muzamel	29 August 1974	2	1991	1993	7	4–2	1–1	5–3
**Adrienn Nagy**	24 March 2001	1	2019	2019	2	1–0	1–0	2–0
Kyra Nagy	29 December 1977	4	2002	2007	11	4–6	2–4	6–10
Anna Németh	6 August 1953	2	1979	1980	3	0–2	1–0	1–2
Virág Németh	19 June 1985	2	2005	2006	7	1–1	3–3	4–4
Andrea Noszály	7 January 1970	2	1989	1990	3	1–2	2–0	3–2
Barbara Pócza	6 April 1986	1	2005	2005	2	0–1	1–0	1–1
Erzsébet Polgár	23 June 1943	1	1969	1969	1	0–1	0–0	0–1
Andrea Ritecz	3 November 1965	1	1984	1984	3	1–2	1–1	2–3
Éva Rózsavölgyi	17 February 1957	5	1979	1984	12	3–4	3–9	6–13
Petra Schmitt	24 October 1973	2	1988	1991	3	1–2	0–0	1–3
Fanny Stollár	12 November 1998	3	2016	2018	8	3–2	4–0	7–2
Zsófia Susányi	16 February 1992	2	2009	2010	4	0–2	0–2	0–4
Éva Szabó	30 October 1945	4	1966	1976	9	6–1	2–4	8–5
Ágnes Szávay	29 December 1988	4	2005	2009	14	8–3	8–5	16–8
Erzsébet Széll	7 December 1945	2	1966	1975	3	2–0	0–2	2–2
Réka Szikszay	3 August 1965	4	1986	1990	13	3–7	11–2	14–9
Szabina Szlavikovics	5 September 1995	1	2004	2004	1	0–1	1–0	1–1
Judit Szörényi	8 December 1949	2	1979	1980	5	1–4	0–4	1–8
Andrea Temesvári	26 April 1966	10	1981	1996	27	13–14	14–6	27–20
Réka Vidáts	19 July 1979	1	1997	1997	3	1–0	2–1	3–1

== Results ==
=== Overview ===
Tournament	1963	1964	1965	1966	1967	1968	1969	1970	1971	1972	1973	1974	1975	1976	1977	1978	1979	1980	1981	1982	1983	1984	1985	1986	1987	1988	1989	1990
Federation Cup
World Group	QF	A	A	2R	A	A	1R	2R	A	A	A	A	2R	2R	A	A	1R	1R	1R	A	2R	1R	QF	1R	A	1R	2R	1R
Consolation Rounds	Not Held						A	A	A	A	A	A	F	A	A	NH	1R	QF	QF	A	A	2R	A	SF	A	2R	A	F

Tournament	1991	1992	1993	1994	1995	1996	1997	1998	1999	2000	2001	2002	2003	2004	2005	2006	2007	2008	2009	2010	2011	2012	2013	2014	2015	2016	2017	2018	2019
Federation Cup				Fed Cup																									
World Group	1R	1R	A	A	A	A	A	A	A	A	A	1R	A	A	A	A	A	A	A	A	A	A	A	A	A	A	A	A	A
World Group play-offs	W	L	A	NH	A	A	A	A	NH	NH	W	L	L	A	A	A	A	A	A	A	A	A	A	A	A	A	A	A	A
World Group II	Not Held				A	A	A	A	A	Not Held					A	A	A	A	A	A	A	A	A	A	A	A	A	A	A
World Group II play-offs	Not Held				A	A	A	A	A	Not Held					A	A	A	A	A	A	A	A	A	A	A	A	A	A	A
Europe/Africa Group I play-offs	A	A	L	L	L	L	L	A	A	W	A	A	W	L	A	A	A	A	A	A	A	A	A	A	A	A	A	L	A
Europe/Africa Group I	A	A	2nd	2nd	1st	2nd	2nd	4th	A	1st	A	A	1st	2nd	3rd	3rd	3rd	2nd	2nd	2nd	3rd	2nd	2nd	2nd	2nd	4th	2nd	1st	2nd
Europe/Africa Group II play-offs	Not Held				A	A	Not Held					A	A	A	A	A	A	A	A	A	A	A	A	A	A	W	A	A	A
Europe/Africa Group II	Not Held				A	A	A	A	1st	A	A	A	A	A	A	A	A	A	A	A	A	A	A	A	A	A	A	A	A

== See also ==
- Billie Jean King Cup
- Hungary Davis Cup team
- Hungary at the Hopman Cup
