= La Manga Club =

Spanish holiday, sports and leisure resort

- Residential area
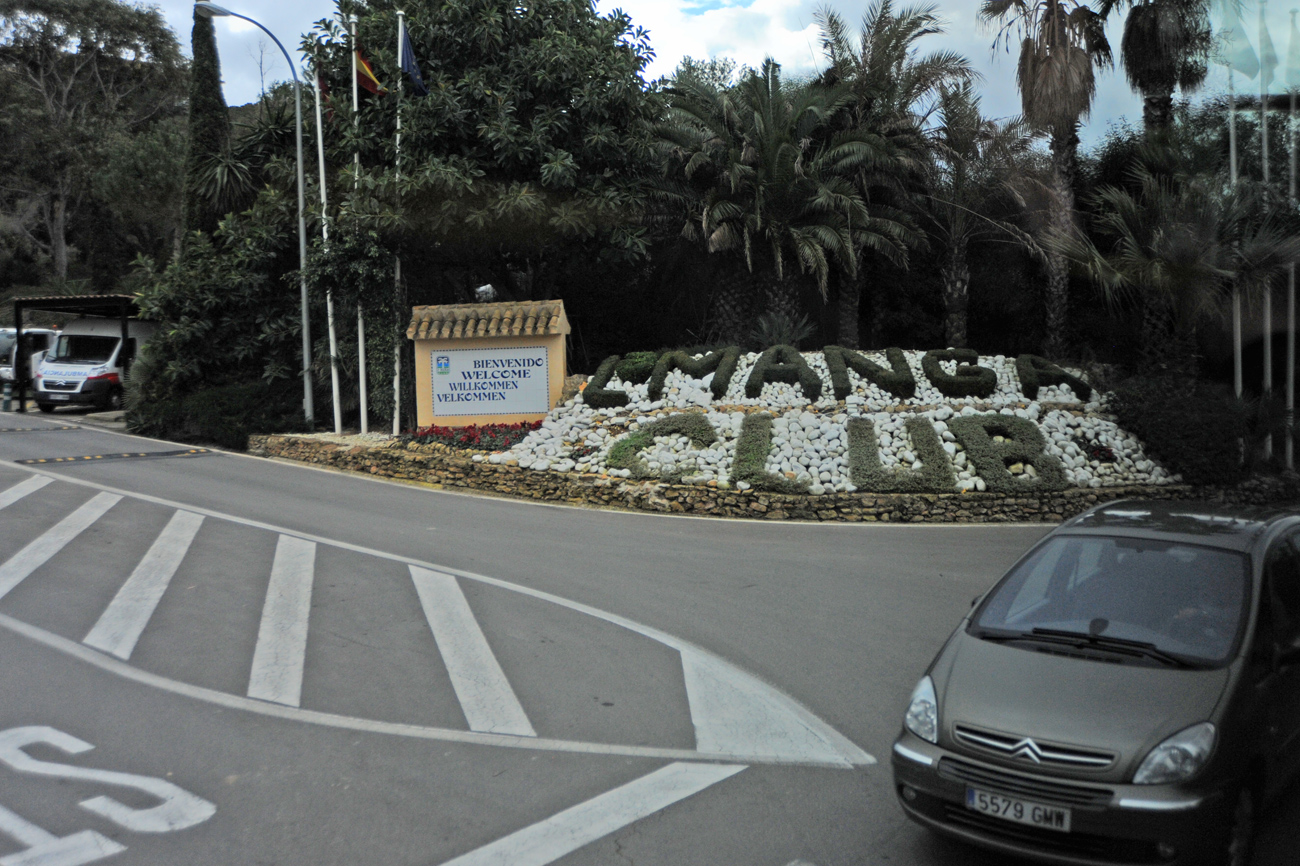
- La Manga Club, 2012

- Location in Spain La Manga Club (Spain)
- Coordinates: 37.6018°N 0.9840°W
- Country: Spain
- Autonomous community: Murcia
- Province: Murcia
- Comarca: Campo de Cartagena
- Municipality: Cartagena
- Established: 1972
- Time zone: UTC+1 (CET)
  - Summer (DST): UTC+2 (CEST)
- Official language(s): Spanish
- Website: Official website

La Manga Club is a sports and leisure resort located in the southeastern region of Murcia, Spain, south of La Manga and bordered by the Mar Menor and Calblanque Regional Park. The resort complex opened in 1972 and covers an area of 1,400 acres (560 ha).

La Manga Club - The Resort, in fact resides within an area called Atamaria, and provides sporting services to an established and growing "Small Town" - The La Manga Club Community - LMCC. It comprises over 2,200 privately owned homes with growing resident population. Within LMCC there is a Church - St Teresa's, a Post Office and local Bank offices.

== Resort facilities ==
Resort facilities include the Grand Hyatt La Manga Club Golf & Spa (formerly the Príncipe Felipe apartment hotel) three golf courses, 28 tennis courts, and eight football pitches, including the La Manga Club Ground and the La Manga Club Football Stadium. The resort has hosted the England national football team for pre-season training, the Spanish Open, and tennis tournaments including the Davis Cup and the Fed Cup.

=== La Manga Club Ground ===
La Manga Club Ground
- La Manga Cricket Bottom Ground
- Interactive map of La Manga Club Ground

Ground information
- Location: La Manga Club, Cartagena, Region of Murcia, Spain
- Establishment: 2005
- Capacity: 3,000
- Owner: La Manga Club
- Operator: Cricket España
- Tenants: Spain national cricket team
- End names
- Las Lomas End; Las Acacias End

International information
- First men's T20I: 29 March 2019: Spain v Malta
- Last men's T20I: 26 February 2023: Spain v Isle of Man
- First women's T20I: 26 August 2021: Germany v Ireland
- Last women's T20I: 30 August 2021: France v Scotland
- As of 14 April 2024; Source: La Manga Club Bottom Ground

La Manga Cricket Club Ground
- Interactive map of La Manga Cricket Club Ground
- Location: La Manga Club, Cartagena, Region of Murcia, Spain
- Owner: La Manga Club
- Operator: Cricket España
- Tenants: Spain national cricket team
- End names
- n/a n/a
- First men's T20I: 14 April 2024: Spain v Jersey
- Last men's T20I: 14 April 2024: Spain v Jersey
- First women's T20I: 26 June 2019: Germany v Scotland
- Last women's T20I: 30 August 2021: Ireland v Netherlands
- As of 14 April 2024; Source: La Manga Club Top Ground

La Manga Club Ground is a multi purpose stadium in La Manga Club. The ground is mainly used for organizing matches of football, cricket and other sports. The ground has yet to host first-class match but it has become premier cricket ground in Spain.

==== International cricket ====
In April 2016, it was announced that Ireland's 2016 Inter-Provincial Trophy will be held at La Manga Club Ground.

La Manga Club hosted its first Twenty20 International (T20I) during 2019 Spain Triangular T20I Series. On 29 March 2019, Awais Ahmed of Spain scored first international century at the venue.

In August 2021 the club hosted ten Women's Twenty20 Internationals for the 2021 ICC Women's T20 World Cup Europe Qualifier

==== International centuries ====
Two T20I centuries and two Women's T20I centuries have been scored at the venue.

===== Twenty20 International centuries =====
No.	Score	Player	Team	Balls	Innings	Opposing team	Date	Result
1	102*	Awais Ahmed	Spain	64	1	Malta	30 March 2019	Won
2	102*	Mohammad Ihsan	Spain	59	1	Isle of Man	24 February 2023	Won

===== Women's Twenty20 International centuries =====
No.	Score	Player	Team	Balls	Innings	Opposing team	Date	Result
1	126*	Sterre Kalis	Netherlands	76	1	Germany	27 June 2019	Won
2	105*	Gaby Lewis	Ireland	60	1	Germany	26 August 2021	Won

=== Real Golf La Manga Club ===
La Manga Club has three 18-hole golf courses, North, South and West Courses. In 2017 the golf club was named Real Golf La Manga Club by The Royal Household of Spain. It has hosted bot the Men's Spanish Open, Women's Spanish Open, the Spanish International Amateur Championship (Copa S.M. el Rey) and the Spanish Senior Open for men.

=== La Manga Club Football Stadium ===
The La Manga Club Football Stadium is a resort stadium that was used to friendly matches and as a resting and training place for the Spain national football team.

== Incidents ==
In 2015, the body of British diver Neil Anthony Fears was discovered near a popular diving attraction in the resort, after he lost contact with three other divers during a dive.

== See also ==
- La Manga Stadium
- List of golf clubs granted Royal status
