= 1991 Federation Cup World Group play-offs =

The World Group play-offs for the 1991 Federation Cup was held from 24 to 26 July at the Nottingham Tennis Centre in Nottingham, United Kingdom, on hard courts.

The sixteen teams that were defeated in the first round of the World Group played off in the first round. Those that lost again would then play off again in the Repechage Round; with the four teams that lost again being relegated to Zonal Competition in 1992.

== Draw ==
Repechage Round; 24–25 July
Brazil	1
Paraguay	2
Portugal	0
Hungary	2
Greece	0
New Zealand	2
Belgium	3
Yugoslavia	0

First Round; 25–26 July
Brazil	1
Argentina	2
Sweden	3
Paraguay	0
Romania	2
Portugal	0
Netherlands	2
Hungary	0
Denmark	2
Greece	1
Israel	2
New Zealand	0
Japan	2
Belgium	1
France	2
Yugoslavia	0

== First round ==
=== Brazil vs. Argentina ===
Brazil
1
Nottingham Tennis Centre, Nottingham, United Kingdom
24 July 1991
Hard

Argentina
2

			1	2	3
1	(Brazil) (Argentina)	Sabrina Giusto; Mercedes Paz	0; 6	1; 6
2	(Brazil) (Argentina)	Luciana Corsato; Patricia Tarabini	6; 1	1; 6	8; 6
3	(Brazil) (Argentina)	Cláudia Chabalgoity / Luciana Corsato; Mercedes Paz / Patricia Tarabini	1; 6	4; 6

=== Sweden vs. Paraguay ===
Sweden
3
Nottingham Tennis Centre, Nottingham, United Kingdom
24 July 1991
Hard

Paraguay
0

			1	2	3
1	(Sweden) (Paraguay)	Maria Strandlund; Larissa Schaerer	6; 4	7; 5
2	(Sweden) (Paraguay)	Cecilia Dahlman; Rossana de los Ríos	6; 3	6; 2
3	(Sweden) (Paraguay)	Jonna Jonerup / Maria Lindström; Rossana de los Ríos / Larissa Schaerer	6; 3	6; 0

=== Romania vs. Portugal ===
Romania
2
Nottingham Tennis Centre, Nottingham, United Kingdom
24 July 1991
Hard

Portugal
0

			1	2	3
1	(Romania) (Portugal)	Ruxandra Dragomir; Tânia Couto	6; 1	6; 0
2	(Romania) (Portugal)	Irina Spîrlea; Sofia Prazeres	2; 6	6; 1	6; 2
3	(Romania) (Portugal)					not played

=== Netherlands vs. Hungary ===
Netherlands
2
Nottingham Tennis Centre, Nottingham, United Kingdom
24 July 1991
Hard

Hungary
0

			1	2	3
1	(Netherlands) (Hungary)	Nicole Krijger-Jagerman; Ágnes Muzamel	7^{7} 6^{1}	6; 2
2	(Netherlands) (Hungary)	Manon Bollegraf; Virág Csurgó	6; 1	6; 3
3	(Netherlands) (Hungary)					not played

=== Denmark vs. Greece ===
Denmark
2
Nottingham Tennis Centre, Nottingham, United Kingdom
25 July 1991
Hard

Greece
1

			1	2	3
1	(Denmark) (Greece)	Karin Ptaszek; Christína Papadáki	6; 2	6; 2
2	(Denmark) (Greece)	Sofie Albinus; Angeliki Kanellopoulou	2; 6	4; 6
3	(Denmark) (Greece)	Sofie Albinus / Karin Ptaszek; Angeliki Kanellopoulou / Christína Papadáki	6; 2	6; 1

=== Israel vs. New Zealand ===
Israel
2
Nottingham Tennis Centre, Nottingham, United Kingdom
25 July 1991
Hard

New Zealand
0

			1	2	3
1	(Israel) (New Zealand)	Ilana Berger; Claudine Toleafoa	6; 2	6; 2
2	(Israel) (New Zealand)	Yael Segal; Belinda Cordwell	6; 0	6; 3
3	(Israel) (New Zealand)					not played

=== Japan vs. Belgium ===
Japan
2
Nottingham Tennis Centre, Nottingham, United Kingdom
25 July 1991
Hard

Belgium
1

			1	2	3
1	(Japan) (Belgium)	Kimiko Date; Sandra Wasserman	6; 2	6; 2
2	(Japan) (Belgium)	Naoko Sawamatsu; Sabine Appelmans	3; 6			retired
3	(Japan) (Belgium)	Kimiko Date / Maya Kidowaki; Sabine Appelmans / Ann Devries	3; 6	6; 2	6; 3

=== France vs. Yugoslavia ===
France
2
Nottingham Tennis Centre, Nottingham, United Kingdom
25 July 1991
Hard

Yugoslavia
0

			1	2	3
1	(France) (Socialist Federal Republic of Yugoslavia)	Mary Pierce; Ljudmila Pavlov	6; 0	6; 1
2	(France) (Socialist Federal Republic of Yugoslavia)	Nathalie Tauziat; Nadin Ercegović	6; 2	5; 7	6; 2
3	(France) (Socialist Federal Republic of Yugoslavia)					not played

== Repechage Round ==
=== Brazil vs. Paraguay ===
Brazil
1
Nottingham Tennis Centre, Nottingham, United Kingdom
25 July 1991
Hard

Paraguay
2

			1	2	3
1	(Brazil) (Paraguay)	Sabrina Giusto; Larissa Schaerer	7; 5	6; 4
2	(Brazil) (Paraguay)	Luciana Corsato; Rossana de los Ríos	1; 6	4; 6
3	(Brazil) (Paraguay)	Cláudia Chabalgoity / Sabrina Giusto; Rossana de los Ríos / Larissa Schaerer	6; 4	1; 6	2; 6

=== Portugal vs. Hungary ===
Portugal
0
Nottingham Tennis Centre, Nottingham, United Kingdom
25 July 1991
Hard

Hungary
2

			1	2	3
1	(Portugal) (Hungary)	Tânia Couto; Ágnes Muzamel	6; 4	5; 7	1; 6
2	(Portugal) (Hungary)	Sofia Prazeres; Petra Schmitt	5; 7	6^{3} 7^{7}
3	(Portugal) (Hungary)					not played

=== Greece vs. New Zealand ===
Greece
0
Nottingham Tennis Centre, Nottingham, United Kingdom
26 July 1991
Hard

New Zealand
2

			1	2	3
1	(Greece) (New Zealand)	Christína Papadáki; Claudine Toleafoa	4; 6	2; 6
2	(Greece) (New Zealand)	Angeliki Kanellopoulou; Belinda Cordwell	1; 6	1; 6
3	(Greece) (New Zealand)					not played

=== Belgium vs. Yugoslavia ===
Belgium
3
Nottingham Tennis Centre, Nottingham, United Kingdom
26 July 1991
Hard

Yugoslavia
0

			1	2	3
1	(Belgium) (Socialist Federal Republic of Yugoslavia)	Sandra Wasserman; Ljudmila Pavlov	6; 2	6; 3
2	(Belgium) (Socialist Federal Republic of Yugoslavia)	Sabine Appelmans; Nadin Ercegović	6; 2	6; 1
3	(Belgium) (Socialist Federal Republic of Yugoslavia)	Sabine Appelmans / Sandra Wasserman; Nadin Ercegović / Ljudmila Pavlov	6; 1	6; 0
