= 1991 Federation Cup World Group =

- Date: 22-28 July
- Edition: 1st

Champions
- Spain
- Fed Cup

The World Group was the highest level of Federation Cup competition in 1991. Thirty-two nations competed in a five-round knockout competition from 22 to 28 July. United States was the two-time defending champion, but Spain won the final to claim its first title.

== Participating teams ==
Participating teams
| Argentina | Australia | Austria | Belgium | Brazil | Bulgaria | Canada | China |
| Czechoslovakia | Denmark | Finland | France | Germany | Great Britain | Greece | Hungary |
| Indonesia | Israel | Italy | Japan | Netherlands | New Zealand | Paraguay | Poland |
| Portugal | Romania | Soviet Union | Spain | Sweden | Switzerland | United States | Yugoslavia |

== Draw ==
First Round; 22–23 July
United States | 2
Netherlands | 0
Hungary | 0
Bulgaria | 3
Finland | 3
Q | Romania | 0
Q | Portugal | 0
Austria | 3
Switzerland | 2
Argentina | 0
Brazil | 0
Q | China | 3
Czechoslovakia | 2
Sweden | 0
Q | Paraguay | 0
Soviet Union | 3
Great Britain | 2
New Zealand | 0
Q | Israel | 1
Italy | 2
Canada | 2
Q | Denmark | 1
Q | Greece | 0
Germany | 3
France | 1
Q | Poland | 2
Yugoslavia | 0
Indonesia | 3
Australia | 2
Japan | 1
Belgium | 0
Spain | 2

Second Round; 24 July
United States | 3
Bulgaria | 0
Finland | 1
Austria | 2
Switzerland | 2
Q | China | 1
Czechoslovakia | 2
Soviet Union | 1
Great Britain | 0
Italy | 2
Canada | 1
Germany | 2
Q | Poland | 1
Indonesia | 2
Australia | 0
Spain | 3

Quarterfinals; 25–26 July
United States | 2
Austria | 1
Switzerland | 1
Czechoslovakia | 2
Italy | 1
Germany | 2
Indonesia | 0
Spain | 2

Semifinals; 27 July
United States | 3
Czechoslovakia | 0
Germany | 0
Spain | 3

Final; 28 July
United States | 1
Spain | 2

== First round ==
=== United States vs. Netherlands ===
United States
2
Nottingham Tennis Centre, Nottingham, United Kingdom
23 July 1991
Hard

Netherlands
0

| | | | 1 | 2 | 3 |
|---|---|---|---|---|---|---|
| 1 | (United States) (Netherlands) | Zina Garrison-Jackson; Nicole Krijger-Jagerman | 7; 5 | 6; 4 |
| 2 | (United States) (Netherlands) | Jennifer Capriati; Manon Bollegraf | 6; 2 | 6; 3 |
| 3 | (United States) (Netherlands) | | | | | not played |

=== Hungary vs. Bulgaria ===
Hungary
0
Nottingham Tennis Centre, Nottingham, United Kingdom
22 July 1991
Hard

Bulgaria
3

| | | | 1 | 2 | 3 |
|---|---|---|---|---|---|
| 1 | (Hungary) (Bulgaria) | Petra Schmitt; Magdalena Maleeva | 1; 6 | 2; 6 |
| 2 | (Hungary) (Bulgaria) | Virág Csurgó; Katerina Maleeva | 0; 6 | 2; 6 |
| 3 | (Hungary) (Bulgaria) | Virág Csurgó / Ágnes Muzamel; Katerina Maleeva / Magdalena Maleeva | 1; 6 | 2; 6 |

=== Finland vs. Romania ===
Finland
3
Nottingham Tennis Centre, Nottingham, United Kingdom
22 July 1991
Hard

Romania
0

| | | | 1 | 2 | 3 |
|---|---|---|---|---|---|
| 1 | (Finland) (Romania) | Nanne Dahlman; Ruxandra Dragomir | 6; 0 | 6; 4 |
| 2 | (Finland) (Romania) | Petra Thorén; Irina Spîrlea | 6; 2 | 6; 2 |
| 3 | (Finland) (Romania) | Anne Aallonen / Nanne Dahlman; Ruxandra Dragomir / Irina Spîrlea | 4; 6 | 6; 2 | 6; 2 |

=== Portugal vs. Austria ===
Portugal
0
Nottingham Tennis Centre, Nottingham, United Kingdom
23 July 1991
Hard

Austria
3

| | | | 1 | 2 | 3 |
|---|---|---|---|---|---|
| 1 | (Portugal) (Austria) | Tânia Couto; Judith Wiesner | 2; 6 | 2; 6 |
| 2 | (Portugal) (Austria) | Sofia Prazeres; Barbara Paulus | 5; 7 | 0; 6 |
| 3 | (Portugal) (Austria) | Tânia Couto / Sofia Prazeres; Marion Maruska / Petra Schwarz | 1; 6 | 1; 6 |

=== Switzerland vs. Argentina ===
Switzerland
2
Nottingham Tennis Centre, Nottingham, United Kingdom
23 July 1991
Hard

Argentina
0

| | | | 1 | 2 | 3 |
|---|---|---|---|---|---|---|
| 1 | (Switzerland) (Argentina) | Emanuela Zardo; Florencia Labat | 2; 6 | 6; 2 | 8; 6 |
| 2 | (Switzerland) (Argentina) | Manuela Maleeva-Fragniere; Mercedes Paz | 6; 0 | 7^{7} 6^{5} |
| 3 | (Switzerland) (Argentina) | | | | | not played |

=== Brazil vs. China ===
Brazil
0
Nottingham Tennis Centre, Nottingham, United Kingdom
22 July 1991
Hard

China
3

| | | | 1 | 2 | 3 |
|---|---|---|---|---|---|
| 1 | (Brazil) (China) | Cláudia Chabalgoity; Tang Min | 5; 7 | 6; 4 | 0; 6 |
| 2 | (Brazil) (China) | Luciana Corsato; Li Fang | 0; 6 | 2; 6 |
| 3 | (Brazil) (China) | Luciana Corsato / Sabrina Giusto; Yang Li-Hua / Yi Jing-Qian | 2; 6 | 3; 6 |

=== Czechoslovakia vs. Sweden ===
Czechoslovakia
2
Nottingham Tennis Centre, Nottingham, United Kingdom
23 July 1991
Hard

Sweden
0

| | | | 1 | 2 | 3 |
|---|---|---|---|---|---|---|
| 1 | (Czechoslovakia) (Sweden) | Radka Zrubáková; Maria Strandlund | 6; 0 | 6; 1 |
| 2 | (Czechoslovakia) (Sweden) | Jana Novotná; Cecilia Dahlman | 7^{7} 6^{5} | 6; 2 |
| 3 | (Czechoslovakia) (Sweden) | | | | | not played |

=== Paraguay vs. Soviet Union ===
Paraguay
0
Nottingham Tennis Centre, Nottingham, United Kingdom
22 July 1991
Hard

Soviet Union
3

| | | | 1 | 2 | 3 |
|---|---|---|---|---|---|
| 1 | (Paraguay) (Soviet Union) | Larissa Schaerer; Elena Brioukhovets | 4; 6 | 5; 7 |
| 2 | (Paraguay) (Soviet Union) | Rossana de los Ríos; Natasha Zvereva | 2; 6 | 2; 6 |
| 3 | (Paraguay) (Soviet Union) | Rossana de los Ríos / Larissa Schaerer; Natalia Medvedeva / Larisa Neiland | 3; 6 | 2; 6 |

=== Great Britain vs. New Zealand ===
Great Britain
2
Nottingham Tennis Centre, Nottingham, United Kingdom
23 July 1991
Hard

New Zealand
0

| | | | 1 | 2 | 3 |
|---|---|---|---|---|---|---|
| 1 | (United Kingdom) (New Zealand) | Clare Wood; Claudine Toleafoa | 6; 3 | 6; 2 |
| 2 | (United Kingdom) (New Zealand) | Monique Javer; Belinda Cordwell | 6; 3 | 6; 1 |
| 3 | (United Kingdom) (New Zealand) | | | | | not played |

=== Israel vs. Italy ===
Israel
1
Nottingham Tennis Centre, Nottingham, United Kingdom
23 July 1991
Hard

Italy
2

| | | | 1 | 2 | 3 |
|---|---|---|---|---|---|
| 1 | (Israel) (Italy) | Ilana Berger; Linda Ferrando | 6; 2 | 4; 6 | 6; 3 |
| 2 | (Israel) (Italy) | Yael Segal; Raffaella Reggi | 6; 0 | 4; 6 | 4; 6 |
| 3 | (Israel) (Italy) | Ilana Berger / Limor Zaltz; Sandra Cecchini / Linda Ferrando | 3; 6 | 7^{7} 6^{1} | 3; 6 |

=== Canada vs. Denmark ===
Canada
2
Nottingham Tennis Centre, Nottingham, United Kingdom
23 July 1991
Hard

Denmark
1

| | | | 1 | 2 | 3 |
|---|---|---|---|---|---|
| 1 | (Canada) (Denmark) | Rene Simpson; Karin Ptaszek | 2; 6 | 6; 2 | 4; 6 |
| 2 | (Canada) (Denmark) | Patricia Hy; Sofie Albinus | 7; 5 | 6; 1 |
| 3 | (Canada) (Denmark) | Jill Hetherington / Patricia Hy; Sofie Albinus / Karin Ptaszek | 6; 3 | 6; 4 |

=== Greece vs. Germany ===
Greece
0
Nottingham Tennis Centre, Nottingham, United Kingdom
23 July 1991
Hard

Germany
3

| | | | 1 | 2 | 3 |
|---|---|---|---|---|---|
| 1 | (Greece) (Germany) | Christína Papadáki; Anke Huber | 6; 3 | 3; 6 | 3; 6 |
| 2 | (Greece) (Germany) | Angeliki Kanellopoulou; Steffi Graf | 1; 6 | 2; 6 |
| 3 | (Greece) (Germany) | Angeliki Kanellopoulou / Christína Papadáki; Steffi Graf / Barbara Rittner | 3; 6 | 0; 6 |

=== France vs. Poland ===
France
1
Nottingham Tennis Centre, Nottingham, United Kingdom
22 July 1991
Hard

Poland
2

| | | | 1 | 2 | 3 |
|---|---|---|---|---|---|
| 1 | (France) (Poland) | Mary Pierce; Magdalena Feistel | 6; 4 | 6; 2 |
| 2 | (France) (Poland) | Nathalie Tauziat; Katarzyna Nowak | 6; 4 | 4; 6 | 4; 6 |
| 3 | (France) (Poland) | Mary Pierce / Nathalie Tauziat; Magdalena Feistel / Katarzyna Teodorowicz-Lisowska | 4; 6 | 4; 6 |

=== Yugoslavia vs. Indonesia ===
Yugoslavia
0
Nottingham Tennis Centre, Nottingham, United Kingdom
22 July 1991
Hard

Indonesia
3

| | | | 1 | 2 | 3 |
|---|---|---|---|---|---|
| 1 | (Socialist Federal Republic of Yugoslavia) (Indonesia) | Ljudmila Pavlov; Suzanna Anggarkusuma | 3; 6 | 3; 6 |
| 2 | (Socialist Federal Republic of Yugoslavia) (Indonesia) | Nadin Ercegović; Yayuk Basuki | 4; 6 | 5; 7 |
| 3 | (Socialist Federal Republic of Yugoslavia) (Indonesia) | Nadin Ercegović / Ljudmila Pavlov; Yayuk Basuki / Suzanna Anggarkusuma | 2; 6 | 2; 6 |

=== Australia vs. Japan ===
Australia
2
Nottingham Tennis Centre, Nottingham, United Kingdom
22 July 1991
Hard

Japan
1

| | | | 1 | 2 | 3 |
|---|---|---|---|---|---|
| 1 | (Australia) (Japan) | Nicole Provis; Akiko Kijimuta | 6; 0 | 6; 1 |
| 2 | (Australia) (Japan) | Rachel McQuillan; Naoko Sawamatsu | 4; 6 | 3; 6 |
| 3 | (Australia) (Japan) | Nicole Provis / Elizabeth Smylie; Kimiko Date / Maya Kidowaki | 6; 3 | 6; 3 |

=== Belgium vs. Spain ===
Belgium
0
Nottingham Tennis Centre, Nottingham, United Kingdom
23 July 1991
Hard

Spain
2

| | | | 1 | 2 | 3 |
|---|---|---|---|---|---|---|
| 1 | (Belgium) (Spain) | Dominique Monami; Conchita Martínez | 3; 6 | 1; 6 |
| 2 | (Belgium) (Spain) | Sabine Appelmans; Arantxa Sánchez Vicario | 6^{5} 7^{7} | 3; 6 |
| 3 | (Belgium) (Spain) | | | | | not played |

== Second round ==
=== United States vs. Bulgaria ===
United States
3
Nottingham Tennis Centre, Nottingham, United Kingdom
24 July 1991
Hard

Bulgaria
0

| | | | 1 | 2 | 3 |
|---|---|---|---|---|---|
| 1 | (United States) (Bulgaria) | Jennifer Capriati; Magdalena Maleeva | 7; 5 | 6; 2 |
| 2 | (United States) (Bulgaria) | Mary Joe Fernández; Katerina Maleeva | 6; 2 | 6; 1 |
| 3 | (United States) (Bulgaria) | Gigi Fernández / Zina Garrison-Jackson; Katerina Maleeva / Magdalena Maleeva | 6; 2 | 6; 1 |

=== Finland vs. Austria ===
Finland
1
Nottingham Tennis Centre, Nottingham, United Kingdom
24 July 1991
Hard

Austria
2

| | | | 1 | 2 | 3 |
|---|---|---|---|---|---|
| 1 | (Finland) (Austria) | Nanne Dahlman; Judith Wiesner | 5; 7 | 1; 6 |
| 2 | (Finland) (Austria) | Petra Thorén; Barbara Paulus | 6; 0 | 6; 3 |
| 3 | (Finland) (Austria) | Anne Aallonen / Petra Thorén; Petra Schwarz / Judith Wiesner | 3; 6 | 6^{8} 7^{10} |

=== Switzerland vs. China ===
Switzerland
2
Nottingham Tennis Centre, Nottingham, United Kingdom
24 July 1991
Hard

China
1

| | | | 1 | 2 | 3 |
|---|---|---|---|---|---|---|
| 1 | (Switzerland) (China) | Emanuela Zardo; Tang Min | 6; 2 | 5; 7 | 6; 1 |
| 2 | (Switzerland) (China) | Manuela Maleeva-Fragniere; Li Fang | 6^{5} 7^{7} | 7; 5 | 6; 2 |
| 3 | (Switzerland) (China) | Cathy Caverzasio / Manuela Maleeva-Fragniere; Li Fang / Yi Jing-Qian | 1; 3 | | | retired |

=== Czechoslovakia vs. Soviet Union ===
Czechoslovakia
2
Nottingham Tennis Centre, Nottingham, United Kingdom
24 July 1991
Hard

Soviet Union
1

| | | | 1 | 2 | 3 |
|---|---|---|---|---|---|
| 1 | (Czechoslovakia) (Soviet Union) | Radka Zrubáková; Elena Brioukhovets | 6; 3 | 3; 6 | 6; 2 |
| 2 | (Czechoslovakia) (Soviet Union) | Jana Novotná; Natasha Zvereva | 6; 4 | 6; 1 |
| 3 | (Czechoslovakia) (Soviet Union) | Eva Švíglerová / Radka Zrubáková; Larisa Neiland / Natasha Zvereva | 1; 6 | 4; 6 |

=== Great Britain vs. Italy ===
Great Britain
0
Nottingham Tennis Centre, Nottingham, United Kingdom
24 July 1991
Hard

Italy
2

| | | | 1 | 2 | 3 |
|---|---|---|---|---|---|---|
| 1 | (United Kingdom) (Italy) | Monique Javer; Raffaella Reggi | 6; 2 | 6^{4} 7^{7} | 7; 9 |
| 2 | (United Kingdom) (Italy) | Jo Durie; Sandra Cecchini | 5; 7 | 4; 6 |
| 3 | (United Kingdom) (Italy) | | | | | not played |

=== Canada vs. Germany ===
Canada
1
Nottingham Tennis Centre, Nottingham, United Kingdom
24 July 1991
Hard

Germany
2

| | | | 1 | 2 | 3 |
|---|---|---|---|---|---|
| 1 | (Canada) (Germany) | Rene Simpson; Anke Huber | 4; 6 | 3; 6 |
| 2 | (Canada) (Germany) | Patricia Hy; Steffi Graf | 3; 6 | 6; 3 | 2; 6 |
| 3 | (Canada) (Germany) | Jill Hetherington / Patricia Hy; Anke Huber / Barbara Rittner | 5; 7 | 6; 1 | 6; 2 |

=== Poland vs. Indonesia ===
Poland
1
Nottingham Tennis Centre, Nottingham, United Kingdom
24 July 1991
Hard

Indonesia
2

| | | | 1 | 2 | 3 |
|---|---|---|---|---|---|
| 1 | (Poland) (Indonesia) | Magdalena Feistel; Suzanna Anggarkusuma | 6; 2 | 6; 1 |
| 2 | (Poland) (Indonesia) | Katarzyna Nowak; Yayuk Basuki | 1; 6 | 1; 6 |
| 3 | (Poland) (Indonesia) | Magdalena Feistel / Katarzyna Teodorowicz-Lisowska; Yayuk Basuki / Suzanna Anggarkusuma | 1; 6 | 1; 6 |

=== Australia vs. Spain ===
Australia
0
Nottingham Tennis Centre, Nottingham, United Kingdom
24 July 1991
Hard

Spain
3

| | | | 1 | 2 | 3 |
|---|---|---|---|---|---|
| 1 | (Australia) (Spain) | Nicole Provis; Conchita Martínez | 0; 6 | 6; 2 | 5; 7 |
| 2 | (Australia) (Spain) | Rachel McQuillan; Arantxa Sánchez Vicario | 1; 6 | 6; 3 | 2; 6 |
| 3 | (Australia) (Spain) | Kristin Godridge / Elizabeth Smylie; Conchita Martínez / Arantxa Sánchez Vicario | 3; 6 | 4; 6 |

== Quarterfinals ==
=== United States vs. Austria ===
United States
2
Nottingham Tennis Centre, Nottingham, United Kingdom
25 July 1991
Hard

Austria
1

| | | | 1 | 2 | 3 |
|---|---|---|---|---|---|
| 1 | (United States) (Austria) | Jennifer Capriati; Judith Wiesner | 2; 6 | 6; 0 | 6; 8 |
| 2 | (United States) (Austria) | Mary Joe Fernández; Barbara Paulus | 6; 1 | 6; 1 |
| 3 | (United States) (Austria) | Gigi Fernández / Zina Garrison-Jackson; Petra Schwarz / Judith Wiesner | 6; 4 | 6; 1 |

=== Switzerland vs. Czechoslovakia ===
Switzerland
1
Nottingham Tennis Centre, Nottingham, United Kingdom
25 July 1991
Hard

Czechoslovakia
2

| | | | 1 | 2 | 3 |
|---|---|---|---|---|---|---|
| 1 | (Switzerland) (Czechoslovakia) | Emanuela Zardo; Radka Zrubáková | 1; 6 | 7; 5 | 4; 6 |
| 2 | (Switzerland) (Czechoslovakia) | Manuela Maleeva-Fragniere; Jana Novotná | 4; 6 | 4; 6 |
| 3 | (Switzerland) (Czechoslovakia) | Cathy Caverzasio / Manuela Maleeva-Fragniere; Jana Novotná / Regina Rajchrtová | 6; 4 | 2; 1 | | retired |

=== Italy vs. Germany ===
Italy
1
Nottingham Tennis Centre, Nottingham, United Kingdom
26 July 1991
Hard

Germany
2

| | | | 1 | 2 | 3 |
|---|---|---|---|---|---|---|
| 1 | (Italy) (Germany) | Raffaella Reggi; Barbara Rittner | 3; 6 | 6; 1 | 3; 6 |
| 2 | (Italy) (Germany) | Sandra Cecchini; Anke Huber | 2; 6 | 3; 6 |
| 3 | (Italy) (Germany) | Federica Bonsignori / Linda Ferrando; Anke Huber / Barbara Rittner | 1; 0 | | | retired |

=== Indonesia vs. Spain ===
Indonesia
0
Nottingham Tennis Centre, Nottingham, United Kingdom
26 July 1991
Hard

Spain
2

| | | | 1 | 2 | 3 |
|---|---|---|---|---|---|---|
| 1 | (Indonesia) (Spain) | Suzanna Anggarkusuma; Conchita Martínez | 2; 6 | 0; 6 |
| 2 | (Indonesia) (Spain) | Yayuk Basuki; Arantxa Sánchez Vicario | 6; 4 | 5; 7 | 4; 6 |
| 3 | (Indonesia) (Spain) | | | | | not played |

== Semifinals ==
=== United States vs. Czechoslovakia ===
United States
3
Nottingham Tennis Centre, Nottingham, United Kingdom
27 July 1991
Hard

Czechoslovakia
0

| | | | 1 | 2 | 3 |
|---|---|---|---|---|---|
| 1 | (United States) (Czechoslovakia) | Jennifer Capriati; Radka Zrubáková | 6; 3 | 6; 1 |
| 2 | (United States) (Czechoslovakia) | Mary Joe Fernández; Jana Novotná | 6; 4 | 0; 6 | 9; 7 |
| 3 | (United States) (Czechoslovakia) | Gigi Fernández / Zina Garrison-Jackson; Regina Rajchrtová / Eva Švíglerová | 6; 2 | 6; 3 |

=== Germany vs. Spain ===
Germany
0
Nottingham Tennis Centre, Nottingham, United Kingdom
27 July 1991
Hard

Spain
3

| | | | 1 | 2 | 3 |
|---|---|---|---|---|---|
| 1 | (Germany) (Spain) | Barbara Rittner; Conchita Martínez | 4; 6 | 1; 6 |
| 2 | (Germany) (Spain) | Anke Huber; Arantxa Sánchez Vicario | 1; 6 | 6; 2 | 2; 6 |
| 3 | (Germany) (Spain) | Anke Huber / Barbara Rittner; Conchita Martínez / Arantxa Sánchez Vicario | 1; 6 | 1; 6 |

== Final ==
=== United States vs. Spain ===
United States
1
Nottingham Tennis Centre, Nottingham, United Kingdom
28 July 1991
Hard

Spain
2

| | | | 1 | 2 | 3 |
|---|---|---|---|---|---|
| 1 | (United States) (Spain) | Jennifer Capriati; Conchita Martínez | 4; 6 | 7^{7} 6^{3} | 6; 1 |
| 2 | (United States) (Spain) | Mary Joe Fernández; Arantxa Sánchez Vicario | 3; 6 | 4; 6 |
| 3 | (United States) (Spain) | Gigi Fernández / Zina Garrison-Jackson; Conchita Martínez / Arantxa Sánchez Vicario | 6; 3 | 1; 6 | 1; 6 |

1991 Federation Cup Champions
(Spain)
Spain
First title
