= 1990 Estoril Open – Women's singles =

Women's singles
- 1990 Estoril Open

Final
- Champion: (Italy) Federica Bonsignori
- Runner-up: (Italy) Laura Garrone
- Score: 2–6, 6–3, 6–3

Details
- Draw: 32 (2WC/4Q/1LL)
- Seeds: 8

Events
Singles	men	women
Doubles	men	women
← 1989 ·	Estoril Open	· 1991 →

Isabel Cueto was the defending champion, but lost in the quarterfinals to Federica Bonsignori.

Bonsignori won the title by defeating Laura Garrone 2–6, 6–3, 6–3 in the final.

== Seeds ==
1. (West Germany) Isabel Cueto (quarterfinals)
2. (Italy) Sandra Cecchini (second round)
3. (West Germany) Sabine Hack (semifinals)
4. (Netherlands) Nicole Jagerman (second round)
5. (Greece) Angeliki Kanellopoulou (second round)
6. (Argentina) Patricia Tarabini (semifinals)
7. (Czechoslovakia) Petra Langrová (first round)
8. (Argentina) Florencia Labat (second round)

== Draw ==
=== Key ===
- Q = Qualifier
- WC = Wild card
- LL = Lucky loser
- Alt = Alternate
- SE = Special exempt
- PR = Protected ranking
- ITF = ITF entry
- JE = Junior exempt
- w/o = Walkover
- r = Retired
- d = Defaulted
- SR = Special ranking

=== Finals ===
Semifinals
(Italy) Federica Bonsignori	2	7^{7}	6
3	(West Germany) Sabine Hack	6	6^{4}	4
(Italy) Laura Garrone	6	6
6	(Argentina) Patricia Tarabini	2	2

Final
(Italy) Federica Bonsignori	2	6	6
(Italy) Laura Garrone	6	3	3

=== Top half ===
First round
1	(West Germany) I Cueto	6	7^{7}
Q	(West Germany) A Kerek	4	6^{3}
(Czechoslovakia) E Švíglerová	6	6
(Czechoslovakia) I Budařová	2	1
LL	(Spain) V Ruano Pascual	2	7^{7}	0
(Italy) F Bonsignori	6	6^{5}	6
WC	(Portugal) S Prazeres	2	6^{3}
5	(Greece) A Kanellopoulou	6	7^{7}
3	(West Germany) S Hack	6	6
(West Germany) V Martinek	2	1
(Austria) S Dopfer	2	1
(Austria) P Ritter	6	6
(France) C Mothes	6	6
(Italy) B Romanò	0	1
Q	(Italy) S Farina	3	1
8	(Argentina) F Labat	6	6

Second round
1	(West Germany) I Cueto	6	6
(Czechoslovakia) E Švíglerová	4	1
(Italy) F Bonsignori	6	6
5	(Greece) A Kanellopoulou	3	1
3	(West Germany) S Hack	6	6
(Austria) P Ritter	2	2
(France) C Mothes	6	6
8	(Argentina) F Labat	4	4

Quarterfinals
1	(West Germany) I Cueto	2	6	4
(Italy) F Bonsignori	6	4	6
3	(West Germany) S Hack	6	6
(France) C Mothes	3	3

Semifinals
(Italy) F Bonsignori	2	7^{7}	6
3	(West Germany) S Hack	6	6^{4}	4

=== Bottom half ===
First round
7	(Czechoslovakia) P Langrová	4	0
Q	(France) N Guerrée	6	6
(Italy) L Garrone	6	6
WC	(Portugal) T Couto	2	3
(France) C Tanvier	3	3
(Switzerland) E Zardo	6	6
(France) P Etchemendy	2	3
4	(Netherlands) N Jagerman	6	6
6	(Argentina) P Tarabini	7^{7}	6
(Luxembourg) K Kschwendt	6^{1}	2
(Brazil) A Vieira	7	6
(West Germany) S Meier	5	1
(Italy) K Piccolini	6	6
Q	(Spain) R Bielsa	1	4
(Czechoslovakia) L Lásková	0	0
2	(Italy) S Cecchini	6	6

Second round
Q	(France) N Guerrée	3	4
(Italy) L Garrone	6	6
(Switzerland) E Zardo	6	6
4	(Netherlands) N Jagerman	1	1
6	(Argentina) P Tarabini	6	6
(Brazil) A Vieira	4	2
(Italy) K Piccolini	6	6
2	(Italy) S Cecchini	4	1

Quarterfinals
(Italy) L Garrone	3	6	6
(Switzerland) E Zardo	6	2	1
6	(Argentina) P Tarabini	6	4	6
(Italy) K Piccolini	2	6	2

Semifinals
(Italy) L Garrone	6	6
6	(Argentina) P Tarabini	2	2
