= 1992 Federation Cup Europe/Africa Zone – Pool B =

Group B of the 1992 Federation Cup Europe/Africa Zone was one of four pools in the Europe/Africa zone of the 1992 Federation Cup. Four teams competed in a round robin competition, with the top two teams advancing to the knockout stage.

	(Croatia) CRO	(Greece) GRE	(Portugal) POR	(Turkey) TUR	RR; W–L	Set; W–L	Game; W–L	Standings
Croatia		2–1	2–0	3–0	3–0	14–4	101–61	1
Greece	1–2		2–1	3–0	2–1	14–6	111–72	2
Portugal	0–2	1–2		3–0	1–2	9–10	87–91	3
Turkey	0–3	0–3	0–3		0–3	1–18	36–111	4

== Croatia vs. Greece ==
Croatia
2
Olympic T.C., Athens, Greece
13 April 1992
Clay (outdoors)

Greece
1

			1	2	3
1	(Croatia) (Greece)	Gorana Matić; Christina Zachariadou	3; 6	3; 6
2	(Croatia) (Greece)	Nadin Ercegović; Christína Papadáki	6; 3	7^{7} 6^{5}
3	(Croatia) (Greece)	Nadin Ercegović / Maja Murić; Christína Papadáki / Christina Zachariadou	6; 3	4; 6	6; 4

== Portugal vs. Turkey ==
Portugal
3
Olympic T.C., Athens, Greece
13 April 1992
Clay (outdoors)

Turkey
0

			1	2	3
1	(Portugal) (Turkey)	Tânia Couto; Duygu Akşit Oal	6; 3	6; 2
2	(Portugal) (Turkey)	Sofia Prazeres; Gülberk Gültekin	6; 1	2; 6	6; 2
3	(Portugal) (Turkey)	Tânia Couto / Sofia Prazeres; Duygu Akşit Oal / Gülberk Gültekin	7; 5	6; 1

== Croatia vs. Turkey ==
Croatia
3
Olympic T.C., Athens, Greece
14 April 1992
Clay (outdoors)

Turkey
0

			1	2	3
1	(Croatia) (Turkey)	Maja Palaveršić; Duygu Akşit Oal	6; 1	6; 0
2	(Croatia) (Turkey)	Nadin Ercegović; Gülberk Gültekin	6; 1	6; 0
3	(Croatia) (Turkey)	Gorana Matić / Maja Murić; Esra Bayburt / Gülberk Gültekin	6; 1	6; 1

== Greece vs. Portugal ==
Greece
2
Olympic T.C., Athens, Greece
14 April 1992
Clay (outdoors)

Portugal
1

			1	2	3
1	(Greece) (Portugal)	Christina Zachariadou; Tânia Couto	6; 4	6; 0
2	(Greece) (Portugal)	Christína Papadáki; Sofia Prazeres	6; 2	6; 1
3	(Greece) (Portugal)	Christína Papadáki / Christina Zachariadou; Tânia Couto / Sofia Prazeres	7; 5	6^{7} 7^{9}	4; 6

== Croatia vs. Portugal ==
Croatia
2
Olympic T.C., Athens, Greece
15 April 1992
Clay (outdoors)

Portugal
0

			1	2	3
1	(Croatia) (Portugal)	Maja Palaveršić; Tânia Couto	4; 6	7^{7} 6^{0}	6; 2
2	(Croatia) (Portugal)	Nadin Ercegović; Sofia Prazeres	6; 3	7^{7} 6^{5}
3	(Croatia) (Portugal)					not played

== Greece vs. Turkey ==
Greece
3
Olympic T.C., Athens, Greece
15 April 1992
Clay (outdoors)

Turkey
0

			1	2	3
1	(Greece) (Turkey)	Christina Zachariadou; Esra Bayburt	6; 0	6; 1
2	(Greece) (Turkey)	Christína Papadáki; Gülberk Gültekin	6; 3	6; 3
3	(Greece) (Turkey)	Christína Papadáki / Christina Zachariadou; Gülberk Gültekin / Yasmin Kaya	6; 3	6; 2

== See also ==
- Fed Cup structure
