= 1990 Estoril Open – Women's doubles =

Women's doubles
- 1990 Estoril Open

Final
- Champions: (Italy) Sandra Cecchini (Argentina) Patricia Tarabini
- Runners-up: (Netherlands) Carin Bakkum (Netherlands) Nicole Jagerman
- Score: 1–6, 6–2, 6–3

Events
Singles	men	women
Doubles	men	women
← 1989 ·	Estoril Open	· 1991 →

Iva Budařová and Regina Rajchrtová were the defending champions, but Rajchrtová opted to rest in order to compete at the Fed Cup the next week. Budařová teamed up with Catherine Tanvier and lost in the semifinals to Carin Bakkum and Nicole Jagerman.

Sandra Cecchini and Patricia Tarabini won the title by defeating Bakkum and Jagerman 1–6, 6–2, 6–3 in the final.

== Seeds ==
1. (Italy) Sandra Cecchini / (Argentina) Patricia Tarabini (champions)
2. (Czechoslovakia) Iva Budařová / (France) Catherine Tanvier (semifinals)
3. (Italy) Laura Garrone / (Czechoslovakia) Petra Langrová (first round)
4. (Argentina) Florencia Labat / (Czechoslovakia) Leona Lásková (semifinals)

== Draw ==
=== Key ===
- Q = Qualifier
- WC = Wild card
- LL = Lucky loser
- Alt = Alternate
- SE = Special exempt
- PR = Protected ranking
- ITF = ITF entry
- JE = Junior exempt
- w/o = Walkover
- r = Retired
- d = Defaulted
- SR = Special ranking

=== Draw ===
First round
1	(Italy) S Cecchini (Argentina) P Tarabini	6	6
(Greece) A Kanellopoulou (Austria) P Ritter	2	3
(West Germany) H Kadzidroga (Venezuela) M Vento	3	6	6
Q	(Austria) S Dopfer (West Germany) V Martinek	6	3	2
4	(Argentina) F Labat (Czechoslovakia) L Lásková	6	6
(Spain) R Bielsa (Spain) N Souto	1	3
(Sweden) M Ekstrand (Austria) H Sprung	3	4
(Italy) B Romanò (Czechoslovakia) E Švíglerová	6	6
(Luxembourg) K Kschwendt (West Germany) S Meier	6	6
(West Germany) A Kerek (Sweden) EL Olsson	0	1
(Netherlands) C Bakkum (Netherlands) N Jagerman	6	6
3	(Italy) L Garrone (Czechoslovakia) P Langrová	4	0
(France) P Etchemendy (France) N Guerrée	4	4
WC	(West Germany) Aura Gheorge (Portugal) S Prazeres	6	6
(West Germany) S Hack (West Germany) C Schneider	2	4
2	(Czechoslovakia) I Budařová (France) C Tanvier	6	6

Quarterfinals
1	(Italy) S Cecchini (Argentina) P Tarabini	6	6
(West Germany) H Kadzidroga (Venezuela) M Vento	2	0
4	' (Argentina) F Labat (Czechoslovakia) L Lásková	6	1	6
(Italy) B Romanò (Czechoslovakia) E Švíglerová	1	6	3
(Luxembourg) K Kschwendt (West Germany) S Meier	1	5
(Netherlands) C Bakkum (Netherlands) N Jagerman	6	7
WC	(West Germany) Aura Gheorge (Portugal) S Prazeres	2	2
2	(Czechoslovakia) I Budařová (France) C Tanvier	6	6

Semifinals
1	(Italy) S Cecchini (Argentina) P Tarabini	6	3	6
4	(Argentina) F Labat (Czechoslovakia) L Lásková	4	6	4
(Netherlands) C Bakkum (Netherlands) N Jagerman	6	6
2	(Czechoslovakia) I Budařová (France) C Tanvier	3	2

Final
1	(Italy) S Cecchini (Argentina) P Tarabini	1	6	6
(Netherlands) C Bakkum (Netherlands) N Jagerman	6	2	3
