= 1990 Estoril Open – Men's doubles =

Men's doubles
- 1990 Estoril Open

Final
- Champions: (Spain) Sergio Casal (Spain) Emilio Sánchez
- Runners-up: (Italy) Omar Camporese (Italy) Paolo Canè
- Score: 7–5, 4–6, 7–5

Details
- Draw: 16
- Seeds: 4

Events
Singles	men	women
Doubles	men	women
Estoril Open	· 1991 →

This was the first edition of the event.

Sergio Casal and Emilio Sánchez won in the final 7–5, 4–6, 7–5, against Omar Camporese and Paolo Canè.

== Seeds ==
1. (Spain) Sergio Casal / (Spain) Emilio Sánchez (champions)
2. (Ecuador) Andrés Gómez / (Spain) Javier Sánchez (quarterfinals)
3. (Spain) Tomás Carbonell / (Czechoslovakia) Karel Nováček (semifinals)
4. (Netherlands) Paul Haarhuis / (Netherlands) Mark Koevermans (quarterfinals)

== Draw ==
=== Key ===
- Q = Qualifier
- WC = Wild card
- LL = Lucky loser
- Alt = Alternate
- ITF = ITF entry
- PR = Protected ranking
- SR = Special ranking
- SE = Special exempt
- JE = Junior exempt
- JR = Junior Accelerator Programme entrant
- CO = College Accelerator Programme entrant
- NG = Next Gen Accelerator Program entrant
- w/o = Walkover
- r = Retired
- d = Defaulted

=== Draw ===
First round
1	(Spain) S Casal (Spain) E Sánchez	6	6
(Spain) J Arrese (Spain) F Clavet	3	2
(Sweden) P Henricsson (Belgium) L Pimek	3	4
(South Africa) D Adams (Czechoslovakia) M Vajda	6	6
3	(Spain) T Carbonell (Czechoslovakia) K Nováček	6	6
WC	(Spain) S Bruguera (Portugal) N Marques	4	3
(Netherlands) H Jan Davids (United States) M Ozer	2	3
(Spain) M Gorriz (United States) K Lubbers	6	6
(Germany) U Riglewski (Spain) B Uribe	6	3	4
(Italy) O Camporese (Italy) P Canè	3	6	6
(Soviet Union) A Cherkasov (Italy) F Mordegan	7^{7}	2	2
4	(Netherlands) P Haarhuis (Netherlands) M Koevermans	6^{5}	6	6
Q	(Argentina) R Azar (Argentina) F Davín	6	2	6^{10}
(Belgium) E Masso (Argentina) G Pérez Roldán	3	6	7^{12}
(Portugal) J Cunha Silva (France) J-P Fleurian	6	6^{5}	5
2	(Ecuador) A Gómez (Spain) J Sánchez	3	7^{7}	7

Quarterfinals
1	(Spain) S Casal (Spain) E Sánchez	7^{7}	6
(South Africa) D Adams (Czechoslovakia) M Vajda	6^{5}	2
3	(Spain) T Carbonell (Czechoslovakia) K Nováček	w/o
(Spain) M Gorriz (United States) K Lubbers
(Italy) O Camporese (Italy) P Canè	w/o
4	(Netherlands) P Haarhuis (Netherlands) M Koevermans
(Belgium) E Masso (Argentina) G Pérez Roldán	4	6	6
2	(Ecuador) A Gómez (Spain) J Sánchez	6	1	4

Semifinals
1	(Spain) S Casal (Spain) E Sánchez	6	6
3	(Spain) T Carbonell (Czechoslovakia) K Nováček	3	4
(Italy) O Camporese (Italy) P Canè	6	6
(Belgium) E Masso (Argentina) G Pérez Roldán	4	1

Final
1	(Spain) S Casal (Spain) E Sánchez	7	4	7
(Italy) O Camporese (Italy) P Canè	5	6	5
