= Maja Murić =

Croatian tennis player

- Full name: Maja Murić
- Country (sports): Yugoslavia (1990-1992); Croatia (1992-2000)
- Born: 27 February 1974 (age 51); Zagreb, SR Croatia, Yugoslavia
- Turned pro: 1990
- Retired: 2002
- Prize money: US$148,502

Singles
- Career record: 73–75
- Career titles: 1 ITF
- Highest ranking: No. 204 (20 February 1995)

Grand Slam singles results
- Australian Open: Q1 (1995)

Doubles
- Career record: 104–97
- Career titles: 8 ITF
- Highest ranking: No. 60 (4 July 1994)

Grand Slam doubles results
- Australian Open: 1R (1995), (1996)
- French Open: 1R (1994), (1997), (1999)
- Wimbledon: QF (1994)
- US Open: 3R (1998), (1999)

Team competitions
- Fed Cup: 14-6
- Last updated on: 14 June 2024.

Maja Murić (born 27 February 1974) is a former professional tennis player from Croatia who is now active with several non-profit organizations.

== Tennis career ==
During a professional tennis career that spanned 1990–2000, Muric played for both Yugoslavia and Croatia. Together with Nadin Ercegović, Gorana Matić, and Maja Palaveršić she was a member of the original Croatian Fed Cup team in 1992. In 1993, Murić represented Croatia at the 1993 Mediterranean Games, where she claimed two gold medals, including one earned with doubles partner Silvija Talaja. With doubles partner Ingelise Driehuis, Murić reached the quarterfinals at 1994 Wimbledon Championships.

Murić represented Croatia in women's doubles at the 1996 Summer Olympics, where she and partner Iva Majoli reached the second round before losing to the Spanish team of Arantxa Sánchez Vicario and Conchita Martínez, 6–2, 6–1.

Murić competed in all of women's doubles Grand Slams from 1991 to 1999.

== Non-profit work ==
Murić's youth in a war-torn nation, combined with the opportunity for international travel provided by her tennis career, motivated her to become involved in charitable activities. She has spent 15 years working with the Little Star Foundation, a non-profit established by fellow former tennis professional Andrea Jaeger, serving as that organization's Treasurer. In 2006, she co-founded Humanitarian Wave, 501(c)(3) non-profit organization focused on helping children and adults living in poverty, suffering from disease, abuse, and neglect.

Murić is now the manager of Galactic Unite, a philanthropic project of Virgin Galactic and Virgin Unite. In that position, she helps develop and manage "programmes that promote education in the areas of science, technology, engineering, and mathematics, as well as entrepreneurship (STEM+)."

== ITF Circuit finals ==
=== Singles (1–3) ===
$100,000 tournaments
$75,000 tournaments
$50,000 tournaments
$25,000 tournaments
$10,000 tournaments

Result	No.	Date	Tournament	Surface	Opponent	Score
Loss	1.	8 April 1991	Belgrade, Yugoslavia	Clay	(Ukraine) Natalia Biletskaya	7–5, 3–6, 3–6
Loss	2.	15 June 1992	Maribor, Slovenia	Clay	(Czechoslovakia) Pavlína Rajzlová	6–7, 6–7
Win	3.	5 December 1994	Nuriootpa, Australia	Hard	(Australia) Kerry-Anne Guse	7–5, 6–1
Loss	4.	20 January 1997	San Antonio, United States	Hard	(United States) Brie Rippner	2–6, 4–6

=== Doubles (8-4) ===
Result	No.	Date	Tournament	Surface	Partner	Opponents	Score
Win	1.	12 August 1991	Pesaro, Italy	Hard	(Australia) Justine Hodder	(Romania) Ruxandra Dragomir (Romania) Irina Spîrlea	6–4, 3–6, 6–3
Loss	2.	21 October 1991	Lyss, Switzerland	Hard	(Socialist Federal Republic of Yugoslavia) Petra Rihtarić	(Italy) Gabriella Boschiero (Socialist Federal Republic of Yugoslavia) Maja Palaveršić	6–3, 1–6, 5–7
Win	3.	16 March 1992	Zaragoza, Spain	Clay	(Croatia) Petra Rihtarić	(Poland) Katarzyna Teodorowicz-Lisowska (Poland) Agata Werblińska	4–6, 6–4, 6–3
Win	4.	21 September 1992	Adriatic, Yugoslavia	Clay	(Croatia) Petra Rihtarić	(Czechoslovakia) Ivana Havrlíková (Czechoslovakia) Markéta Štusková	3–6, 6–1, 6–2
Win	5.	28 September 1992	Mali Lošinj, Yugoslavia	Clay	(Croatia) Petra Rihtarić	(Croatia) Darija Dešković (Slovenia) Karin Lušnic	6–3, 4–6, 6–4
Win	6.	8 February 1993	Faro, Portugal	Clay	(Netherlands) Linda Niemantsverdriet	(Croatia) Darija Dešković (Czech Republic) Monika Kratochvílová	6–3, 6–3
Win	7.	29 March 1993	Marsa, Malta	Clay	(Czech Republic) Klára Bláhová	(Hungary) Virág Csurgó (Slovenia) Tjaša Jezernik	6–3, 5–7, 6–3
Win	8.	7 June 1993	Caserta, Italy	Clay	(Slovenia) Karin Lušnic	(Chile) Paula Cabezas (Italy) Adriana Serra Zanetti	2–6, 6–2, 6–3
Loss	9.	21 November 1994	Mount Gambier, Australia	Hard	(Australia) Louise Pleming	(Australia) Catherine Barclay (United States) Shannan McCarthy	3–6, 4–6
Loss	10.	27 November 1995	Mount Gambier, Australia	Hard	(France) Catherine Tanvier	(Australia) Annabel Ellwood (Australia) Kirrily Sharpe	4–6, 1–6
Loss	11.	11 December 1995	Nuriootpa, Australia	Hard	(Australia) Louise Pleming	(Australia) Annabel Ellwood (Australia) Kirrily Sharpe	4–6, 7–5, 4–6
Win	12.	5 July 1998	Vaihingen, Germany	Clay	(Belgium) Laurence Courtois	(Germany) Julia Abe (Bulgaria) Lubomira Bacheva	6–1, 6–4

== Best Grand Slam results details ==
=== Doubles ===
	Australian Open	
1995 Australian Open
with (Russia) Elena Makarova
Round	Opponents	Score
1R	(Sweden) Maria Lindström / (Sweden) Maria Strandlund	7–5, 5–7, 6–8
1996 Australian Open
with (Belgium) Dominique Van Roost
Round	Opponents	Score
1R	(United States) Lindsay Davenport / (United States) Mary Joe Fernández (3)	1–6, 0–6

	French Open	
1994 French Open
with (United States) Betsy Nagelsen
Round	Opponents	Score
1R	(France) Alexandra Fusai / (Poland) Magdalena Mróz	2–6, 4–6
1997 French Open
with (United States) Tami Whitlinger-Jones
Round	Opponents	Score
1R	(United States) Erika deLone / (Czech Republic) Radka Zrubáková	2–6, 6–4, 3–6
1999 French Open
with (France) Caroline Dhenin
Round	Opponents	Score
1R	(Australia) Rachel McQuillan / (Japan) Nana Miyagi	4–6, 7–6^{(7–1)}, 5–7

	Wimbledon Championships	
1994 Wimbledon
with (Netherlands) Ingelise Driehuis
Round	Opponents	Score
1R	(Netherlands) Gaby Coorengel / (United Kingdom) Alison Smith (LL)	6–2, 5–7, 7–5
2R	(Ukraine) Elena Brioukhovets / (Czech Republic) Petra Langrová	6–4, 2–6, 6–4
3R	(Italy) Laura Golarsa / (Netherlands) Caroline Vis (16)	6–3, 6–4
QF	(Netherlands) Manon Bollegraf / (United States) Martina Navratilova (4)	4–6, 2–6

	US Open	
1998 US Open
with (Belgium) Laurence Courtois
Round	Opponents	Score
1R	(Australia) Annabel Ellwood / (Australia) Trudi Musgrave	6–2, 6–2
2R	(Chinese Taipei) Janet Lee / (Chinese Taipei) Wang Shi-ting	6–4, 6–4
3R	(France) Caroline Dhenin / (France) Émilie Loit	5–7, 4–6
1999 US Open (qualifier)
with (Bulgaria) Svetlana Krivencheva
Round	Opponents	Score
Q1	(Romania) Magda Mihalache / (Australia) Bryanne Stewart (8)	6–0, 6–4
Q2	(Belarus) Olga Barabanschikova / (Switzerland) Emmanuelle Gagliardi	1–6, 7–6^{(10–8)}, 6–3
1R	(Croatia) Jelena Kostanić / (Belarus) Tatiana Poutchek (Q)	6–2, 7–6
2R	(Netherlands) Seda Noorlander / (Austria) Patricia Wartusch	0–6, 7–5, 6–4
3R	(United States) Mary Joe Fernández / (United States) Monica Seles (10)	5–7, 6–7
