= Gorana Matić =

Croatian tennis player (born 1973)

- Full name: Gorana Matić
- Country (sports): Yugoslavia (1988–1992); Croatia (1992-1994)
- Born: October 24, 1973 (age 51); Split, SR Croatia, Yugoslavia
- Turned pro: 1989
- Retired: 1994
- Plays: Right-handed
- Prize money: $16,380

Singles
- Career record: 75–57
- Career titles: 2 ITF
- Highest ranking: No. 287 (10 September 1990)

Doubles
- Career record: 2–8
- Highest ranking: No. 656 (1 October 1990)

Team competitions
- Fed Cup: 6-5
- Last updated on: 14 June 2024.

Gorana Matić (born October 24, 1973) is a former Croatian tennis player that played for Yugoslavia and later for Croatia.

== Career ==
Matić didn't have much success in her career but she is nevertheless important for the history of Croatian tennis. Together with Nadin Ercegović, Maja Murić and Maja Palaveršić she was a member of the original Croatian Fed Cup team in 1992. She also played the first Croatian Fed Cup match which was also the first Croatian international tennis match at representative level.

== ITF Circuit finals ==
Legend $10,000 tournaments (2–1)	Finals by surface Clay (2–1)

=== Singles: 3 (2 titles, 1 runner-up) ===
Result	W–L	Date	Tournament	Tier	Surface	Opponent	Score
Win	1–0	Sep 1989	ITF Mali Lošinj, Yugoslavia	10,000	Clay	(Spain) Ana Segura	6–4, 6–2
Win	2–0	Jul 1990	ITF Spoleto, Italy	10,000	Clay	(Hungary) Virág Csurgó	3–6, 7–6, 6–4
Loss	2–1	Sep 1990	ITF Rabac, Yugoslavia	10,000	Clay	(Romania) Ruxandra Dragomir	3–6, 1–6

== First Croatian international tennis match ==
Edition	Round	Date	Location	Against	Surface	Opponent	W/L	Score
1992 Federation Cup	E/A Zone – Pool B	13 April 1992	Athens, Greece	Greece	Clay (outdoors)	(Greece) Christina Zachariadou	L	3–6, 3–6
