= 1989 Rado Swiss Open – Doubles =

Doubles
- 1989 Rado Swiss Open

Final
- Champions: (Brazil) Cássio Motta (United States) Todd Witsken
- Runners-up: (Czechoslovakia) Petr Korda (Czechoslovakia) Milan Šrejber
- Score: 6–4, 6–3

Details
- Draw: 16 (1WC)
- Seeds: 4

Events
Singles	Doubles
- Swiss Open

Petr Korda and Milan Šrejber were the defending champions, but lost in the final to Cássio Motta and Todd Witsken. The score was 6–4, 6–3.

== Seeds ==
1. (Spain) Emilio Sánchez / (Spain) Javier Sánchez (first round)
2. (Spain) Sergio Casal / (Hungary) Balázs Taróczy (first round)
3. (Czechoslovakia) Petr Korda / (Czechoslovakia) Milan Šrejber (final)
4. (Brazil) Cássio Motta / (United States) Todd Witsken (champions)

== Draw ==
Key

- Q = Qualifier
- WC = Wild card
- LL = Lucky loser
- Alt = Alternate
- ITF = ITF entry
- PR = Protected ranking
- SR = Special ranking
- SE = Special exempt
- JE = Junior exempt
- JR = Junior Accelerator Programme entrant
- CO = College Accelerator Programme entrant
- NG = Next Gen Accelerator Program entrant
- w/o = Walkover
- r = Retired
- d = Defaulted

=== Draw ===
First round
1	(Spain) E Sánchez (Spain) J Sánchez	5	6	4
(Socialist Federal Republic of Yugoslavia) G Ivanišević (Austria) H Skoff	7	2	6
(Haiti) R Agénor (Iran) M Bahrami	6	6	4
(Switzerland) H Günthardt (Switzerland) J Hlasek	7	4	6
4	(Brazil) C Motta (United States) T Witsken	7	6
(West Germany) R Osterthun (West Germany) U Riglewski	6	4
(Switzerland) S Mezzadri (Italy) F Mordegan	6	6
WC	(Spain) S Bruguera (Israel) A Mansdorf	3	3
(United States) B Dickinson (Czechoslovakia) C Suk	6	6	3
(Venezuela) A Mora (United States) M Ozer	3	7	6
(Sweden) J Svensson (France) T Tulasne	4	2
3	(Czechoslovakia) P Korda (Czechoslovakia) M Šrejber	6	6
(Spain) F Clavet (Sweden) M Gustafsson	6	6
(Argentina) H de la Peña (Switzerland) C Mezzadri	3	4
(Czechoslovakia) K Nováček (Czechoslovakia) M Vajda	4	6	6
2	(Spain) S Casal (Hungary) B Taróczy	6	4	3

Quarterfinals
(Socialist Federal Republic of Yugoslavia) G Ivanišević (Austria) H Skoff	7	6
(Switzerland) H Günthardt (Switzerland) J Hlasek	6	4
4	(Brazil) C Motta (United States) T Witsken	7	6	6
(Switzerland) S Mezzadri (Italy) F Mordegan	5	7	4
(Venezuela) A Mora (United States) M Ozer	6	7	6
3	(Czechoslovakia) P Korda (Czechoslovakia) M Šrejber	7	6	7
(Spain) F Clavet (Sweden) M Gustafsson	6	6
(Czechoslovakia) K Nováček (Czechoslovakia) M Vajda	2	3

Semifinals
(Socialist Federal Republic of Yugoslavia) G Ivanišević (Austria) H Skoff	2	2
4	(Brazil) C Motta (United States) T Witsken	6	6
3	(Czechoslovakia) P Korda (Czechoslovakia) M Šrejber	6	6	6
(Spain) F Clavet (Sweden) M Gustafsson	7	1	3

Final
4	(Brazil) C Motta (United States) T Witsken	6	6
3	(Czechoslovakia) P Korda (Czechoslovakia) M Šrejber	4	3
