= Kevin Lubbers =

American tennis player

- Country (sports): United States

Singles
- Highest ranking: No. 641 (Aug 21, 1989)

Doubles
- Career record: 1–4
- Highest ranking: No. 255 (Apr 9, 1990)

Grand Slam doubles results
- Wimbledon: Q1 (1989, 1990)

Kevin Lubbers is an American former professional tennis player.

Lubbers, a Maryland native, attended Bethesda-Chevy Chase High School and was the 1981 MPSSAA singles champion. In 1986 he partnered with Mark Ozer to win a national amateur doubles title at the USTA Indoor Championships. On the professional tour he was most successful in doubles, with a best world ranking of 255. He was a doubles quarter-finalist at the 1990 Estoril Open and featured in doubles qualifying draws at Wimbledon.

== ATP Challenger finals ==
=== Doubles: 1 (0–1) ===
Result	Date	Tournament	Surface	Partner	Opponents	Score
Loss	Aug 1989	Goiânia, Brazil	Clay	(Brazil) Otávio Della	(Brazil) Alexandre Hocevar (Brazil) Marcos Hocevar	2–6, 2–6
