= 1989 Estoril Open – Doubles =

Doubles
- 1989 Estoril Open

Final
- Champions: (Czechoslovakia) Iva Budařová; (Czechoslovakia) Regina Rajchrtová
- Runners-up: (Argentina) Gaby Castro; (Spain) Conchita Martínez
- Score: 6–2, 6–4

Events
Singles	Doubles
Estoril Open	· 1990 →

Iva Budařová and Regina Rajchrtová won in the final 6–2, 6–4 against Gaby Castro and Conchita Martínez.

== Seeds ==
Champion seeds are indicated in bold text while text in italics indicates the round in which those seeds were eliminated.

1. (Socialist Federal Republic of Yugoslavia) Sabrina Goleš / (Denmark) Tine Scheuer-Larsen (quarterfinals)
2. (Italy) Sandra Cecchini / (Argentina) Patricia Tarabini (semifinals)
3. (Czechoslovakia) **Iva Budařová** / (Czechoslovakia) **Regina Rajchrtová (champions)**
4. (Australia) Kate McDonald / (Argentina) Adriana Villagrán (quarterfinals)

== Draw ==
=== Key ===
- Q = Qualifier
- WC = Wild card
- LL = Lucky loser
- Alt = Alternate
- SE = Special exempt
- PR = Protected ranking
- ITF = ITF entry
- JE = Junior exempt
- w/o = Walkover
- r = Retired
- d = Defaulted
- SR = Special ranking

First round

Quarterfinals

Semifinals

Final

1
- (Socialist Federal Republic of Yugoslavia) **S Goleš**
- (Denmark) **T Scheuer-Larsen**
**6**
**6**

- (South Africa) E Crous
- (Netherlands) J Koran
0
1

1
- (Socialist Federal Republic of Yugoslavia) S Goleš
- (Denmark) T Scheuer-Larsen
6
**6**
5

- (Italy) **L Garrone**
- (Italy) **L Golarsa**
**6**
**7**

- (Italy) **L Garrone**
- (Italy) **L Golarsa**
**7**
0
**7**

- (West Germany) I Cueto
- (West Germany) C Singer
2
5

- (Italy) L Garrone
- (Italy) L Golarsa
**6**
2
3

3
- (Czechoslovakia) **I Budařová**
- (Czechoslovakia) **R Rajchrtová**
**6**
**6**

3
- (Czechoslovakia) **I Budařová**
- (Czechoslovakia) **R Rajchrtová**
4
**6**
**6**

- (Italy) S Isidori
- (Greece) O Tsarbopoulou
3
4

3
- (Czechoslovakia) **I Budařová**
- (Czechoslovakia) **R Rajchrtová**
3
**6**

- (West Germany) **S Hack**
- (Czechoslovakia) **R Maršíková**
**6**
**6**

- (West Germany) S Hack
- (Czechoslovakia) R Maršíková
**6**
1
r

- (Austria) B Paulus
- (Austria) P Ritter
4
3

3
- (Czechoslovakia) **Iva Budařová**
- (Czechoslovakia) **Regina Rajchrtová**
**6**
**6**

- (Spain) R Bielsa
- (Spain) J Souto
2
3

- (Argentina) Gaby Castro
- (Spain) Conchita Martínez
2
4

- (Argentina) **G Castro**
- (Spain) **C Martínez**
**6**
**6**

- (Argentina) **G Castro**
- (Spain) **C Martínez**
**6**
**6**

- (Spain) M Rey
- (Portugal) P Valadas
0
1

4
- (Australia) K McDonald
- (Argentina) A Villagrán
2
3

4
- (Australia) **K McDonald**
- (Argentina) **A Villagrán**
**6**
**6**

- (Argentina) **G Castro**
- (Spain) **C Martínez**
**6**
4
**6**

- (Argentina) F Labat
- (Argentina) G Mosca
5
1

2
- (Italy) S Cecchini
- (Argentina) P Tarabini
0
**6**
4

- (Brazil) **L Corsato-Owsianka**
- (Brazil) **A Vieira**
**7**
**6**

- (Brazil) L Corsato-Owsianka
- (Brazil) A Vieira
4
**7**
5

- (Luxembourg) K Kschwendt
- (Uruguay) P Miller
2
2

2
- (Italy) **S Cecchini**
- (Argentina) **P Tarabini**
**6**
5
**7**

2
- (Italy) **S Cecchini**
- (Argentina) **P Tarabini**
**6**
**6**
