= 1989 Estoril Open – Singles =

Singles
- 1989 Estoril Open

Final
- Champion: (West Germany) Isabel Cueto
- Runner-up: (Italy) Sandra Cecchini
- Score: 7–6, 6–2

Details
- Draw: 32
- Seeds: 8

Events
Singles	Doubles
Estoril Open	· 1990 →

Isabel Cueto won in the final 7–6, 6–2 against Sandra Cecchini.

== Seeds ==
A champion seed is indicated in bold text while text in italics indicates the round in which that seed was eliminated.

1. n/a
2. (Austria) Barbara Paulus (quarterfinals)
3. (West Germany) **Isabel Cueto (champion)**
4. (Italy) Sandra Cecchini (final)
5. (Austria) Judith Wiesner (second round)
6. (Czechoslovakia) Regina Rajchrtová (quarterfinals)
7. (Argentina) Patricia Tarabini (semifinals)
8. (Italy) Laura Garrone (quarterfinals)

== Draw ==
=== Key ===
- Q = Qualifier
- WC = Wild card
- LL = Lucky loser
- Alt = Alternate
- SE = Special exempt
- PR = Protected ranking
- ITF = ITF entry
- JE = Junior exempt
- w/o = Walkover
- r = Retired
- d = Defaulted
- SR = Special ranking

First round
LL	(West Germany) C Singer	3	1
Q	(Italy) **K Piccolini**	**6**	**6**
(West Germany) **S Hack**	**6**	**6**
(United Kingdom) A Hobbs	0	2
(France) A Dechaume	5	5
Q	(Italy) **F Bonsignori**	**7**	**7**
(Argentina) A Villagrán	0	0
8	(Italy) **L Garrone**	**6**	**6**
3	(West Germany) **I Cueto**	**7**	**7**
(Italy) L Golarsa	6	5
(Socialist Federal Republic of Yugoslavia) S Goleš	4	2
Q	(Austria) **S Dopfer**	**6**	**6**
(France) **P Etchemendy**	1	**6**	**6**
Q	(Spain) R Bielsa	**6**	2	4
(Sweden) C Dahlman	2	6
6	(Czechoslovakia) **R Rajchrtová**	**6**	**7**
5	(Austria) **J Wiesner**	**6**	**6**
(Brazil) L Corsato-Owsianka	3	1
(Brazil) **A Vieira**	1	**6**	**6**
(Denmark) T Scheuer-Larsen	**6**	4	1
(Austria) **P Ritter**	**7**	**6**
(Uruguay) P Miller	5	1
(Greece) O Tsarbopoulou	4	4
4	(Italy) **S Cecchini**	**6**	**6**
7	(Argentina) **P Tarabini**	**6**	**6**
(South Africa) E Crous	0	1
(Switzerland) C Cohen	2	2
(Czechoslovakia) **R Maršíková**	**6**	**6**
(Argentina) F Labat	4	4
(Luxembourg) **K Kschwendt**	**6**	**6**
(Czechoslovakia) I Budařová	2	0
2	(Austria) **B Paulus**	**6**	**6**

Second round
Q	(Italy) **K Piccolini**	**6**	**6**
(West Germany) S Hack	4	1
Q	(Italy) F Bonsignori	4	1
8	(Italy) **L Garrone**	**6**	**6**
3	(West Germany) **I Cueto**	**6**	**6**
Q	(Austria) S Dopfer	2	2
(France) P Etchemendy	1	2
6	(Czechoslovakia) **R Rajchrtová**	**6**	**6**
5	(Austria) J Wiesner	4	2
(Brazil) **A Vieira**	**6**	**6**
(Austria) P Ritter	6	**6**	2
4	(Italy) **S Cecchini**	**7**	2	**6**
7	(Argentina) **P Tarabini**	**6**	**6**
(Czechoslovakia) R Maršíková	0	4
(Luxembourg) K Kschwendt	0	**6**	3
2	(Austria) **B Paulus**	**6**	1	**6**

Quarterfinals
Q	(Italy) **K Piccolini**	**7**	**6**
8	(Italy) L Garrone	5	3
3	(West Germany) **I Cueto**	**6**	**6**
6	(Czechoslovakia) R Rajchrtová	2	2
(Brazil) A Vieira	3	2
4	(Italy) **S Cecchini**	**6**	**6**
7	(Argentina) **P Tarabini**	**6**	5	**7**
2	(Austria) B Paulus	4	**7**	5

Semifinals
Q	(Italy) K Piccolini	0	2
3	(West Germany) **I Cueto**	**6**	**6**
4	(Italy) **S Cecchini**	2	**6**	**6**
7	(Argentina) P Tarabini	**6**	4	4

Final
3	(West Germany) **Isabel Cueto**	**7**	**6**
4	(Italy) Sandra Cecchini	6	2
