= 1989 Rado Swiss Open – Singles =

Singles
- 1989 Rado Swiss Open

Final
- Champion: (West Germany) Carl-Uwe Steeb
- Runner-up: (Sweden) Magnus Gustafsson
- Score: 6–7^{(6–8)}, 3–6, 6–2, 6–4, 6–2

Details
- Draw: 32 (3WC/4Q)
- Seeds: 8

Events
Singles	Doubles
- Swiss Open

Darren Cahill was the defending champion, but did not compete this year.

Carl-Uwe Steeb won the title by defeating Magnus Gustafsson 6–7^{(6–8)}, 3–6, 6–2, 6–4, 6–2 in the final.

== Seeds ==
1. (Switzerland) Jakob Hlasek (second round)
2. (United States) Aaron Krickstein (quarterfinals)
3. (Spain) Emilio Sánchez (second round)
4. (Israel) Amos Mansdorf (first round)
5. (Austria) Horst Skoff (first round)
6. (Haiti) Ronald Agénor (first round)
7. (Sweden) Jonas Svensson (first round)
8. (West Germany) Carl-Uwe Steeb (champion)

== Draw ==
Key

- Q = Qualifier
- WC = Wild card
- LL = Lucky loser
- Alt = Alternate
- ITF = ITF entry
- PR = Protected ranking
- SR = Special ranking
- SE = Special exempt
- JE = Junior exempt
- JR = Junior Accelerator Programme entrant
- CO = College Accelerator Programme entrant
- NG = Next Gen Accelerator Program entrant
- w/o = Walkover
- r = Retired
- d = Defaulted

=== Finals ===
Semifinals
(Sweden) Jan Gunnarsson	4	2
(Sweden) Magnus Gustafsson	6	6
(Spain) Sergi Bruguera	4	7	3
8	(Germany) Carl-Uwe Steeb	6	5	6

Final
(Sweden) Magnus Gustafsson	7^{8}	6	2	4	2
8	(Germany) Carl-Uwe Steeb	6^{6}	3	6	6	6

=== Top half ===
First round
1	(Switzerland) J Hlasek	6	6
(Socialist Federal Republic of Yugoslavia) M Ostoja	4	2
(Czechoslovakia) M Šrejber	5	4
(United States) T Witsken	7	6
WC	(Switzerland) C Mezzadri	6	6
WC	(Switzerland) R Stadler	2	3
(Sweden) J Gunnarsson	6	6
7	(Sweden) J Svensson	1	4
4	(Israel) A Mansdorf	6	4
(Argentina) H de la Peña	7	6
(Czechoslovakia) K Nováček	6	7
(Spain) S Casal	3	6
(Czechoslovakia) M Vajda	4	6	3
(Socialist Federal Republic of Yugoslavia) G Ivanišević	6	3	6
(Sweden) M Gustafsson	6	7
5	(Austria) H Skoff	4	5

Second round
1	(Switzerland) J Hlasek	4	0
(United States) T Witsken	6	6
WC	(Switzerland) C Mezzadri	4	2
(Sweden) J Gunnarsson	6	6
(Argentina) H de la Peña	6	5	7
(Czechoslovakia) K Nováček	4	7	5
(Socialist Federal Republic of Yugoslavia) G Ivanišević	5	2
(Sweden) M Gustafsson	7	6

Quarterfinals
(United States) T Witsken	5	4
(Sweden) J Gunnarsson	7	6
(Argentina) H de la Peña	4	4
(Sweden) M Gustafsson	6	6

Semifinals
(Sweden) J Gunnarsson	4	2
(Sweden) M Gustafsson	6	6

=== Bottom half ===
First round
6	(Haiti) R Agénor	3	2
(Spain) S Bruguera	6	6
(France) T Tulasne	7	6	6
(Czechoslovakia) P Korda	6	7	7
(West Germany) U Riglewski	6	7	6
Q	(Spain) F Clavet	7	6	2
(Spain) J Sánchez	4	4
3	(Spain) E Sánchez	6	6
8	(West Germany) CU Steeb	5	6	6
Q	(Czechoslovakia) C Suk	7	2	2
(Brazil) C Motta	6	6
Q	(West Germany) A Lesch	4	3
(Czechoslovakia) M Střelba	7	6
Q	(France) L Prades	6	3
WC	(West Germany) R Osterthun	2	4
2	(United States) A Krickstein	6	6

Second round
(Spain) S Bruguera	6	4	6
(Czechoslovakia) P Korda	1	6	3
(West Germany) U Riglewski	5	7	7
3	(Spain) E Sánchez	7	6	5
8	(West Germany) CU Steeb	4	7	7
(Brazil) C Motta	6	6	6
(Czechoslovakia) M Střelba	2	3
2	(United States) A Krickstein	6	6

Quarterfinals
(Spain) S Bruguera	7	6
(West Germany) U Riglewski	5	4
8	(West Germany) CU Steeb	6	6
2	(United States) A Krickstein	2	4

Semifinals
(Spain) S Bruguera	4	7	3
8	(West Germany) CU Steeb	6	5	6
