= 1990 Estoril Open – Men's singles =

Men's singles
- 1990 Estoril Open

Final
- Champion: (Spain) Emilio Sánchez
- Runner-up: (Argentina) Franco Davín
- Score: 6–3, 6–1

Details
- Draw: 32
- Seeds: 8

Events
Singles	men	women
Doubles	men	women
Estoril Open	· 1991 →

This was the first edition of the event.

Emilio Sánchez won in the final 6–3, 6–1, defeating Franco Davín.

== Seeds ==
1. (United States) Jay Berger (Quarterfinals)
2. (Argentina) Martín Jaite (first round)
3. (Spain) Emilio Sánchez (champion)
4. (Ecuador) Andrés Gómez (first round)
5. (Austria) Thomas Muster (quarterfinals)
6. (Peru) Jaime Yzaga (first round)
7. (Argentina) Guillermo Pérez Roldán (first round)
8. (Spain) Sergi Bruguera (second round)

== Draw ==
=== Key ===
- Q = Qualifier
- WC = Wild card
- LL = Lucky loser
- Alt = Alternate
- ITF = ITF entry
- PR = Protected ranking
- SR = Special ranking
- SE = Special exempt
- JE = Junior exempt
- JR = Junior Accelerator Programme entrant
- CO = College Accelerator Programme entrant
- NG = Next Gen Accelerator Program entrant
- w/o = Walkover
- r = Retired
- d = Defaulted

=== Finals ===
Semifinals
(Spain) Jordi Arrese	2	1
3	(Spain) Emilio Sánchez	6	6
(Spain) Juan Aguilera	4	3
(Argentina) Franco Davín	6	6

Final
3	(Spain) Emilio Sánchez	6	6
(Argentina) Franco Davín	3	1

=== Top half ===
First round
1 WC	(United States) J Berger	6	6
WC	(Portugal) J Cunha Silva	1	3
(Haiti) R Agénor	7^{7}	7^{7}
(Spain) J Sánchez	6^{3}	6^{2}
Q	(Spain) F Clavet	1	3
(Spain) J Arrese	6	6
(Soviet Union) A Cherkasov	7	6
7	(Argentina) G Pérez Roldán	5	3
3	(Spain) E Sánchez	6	7
(Australia) R Fromberg	4	5
(Spain) T Carbonell	6	7^{7}
(France) J Fleurian	2	6^{4}
(Italy) O Camporese	6	6
(West Germany) U Riglewski	4	3
(Czechoslovakia) K Nováček	6	3	6
6	(Peru) J Yzaga	3	6	2

Second round
1 WC	(United States) J Berger	7	7^{7}
(Haiti) R Agénor	5	6^{5}
(Spain) J Arrese	6	6
(Soviet Union) A Cherkasov	2	2
3	(Spain) E Sánchez	6	6
(Spain) T Carbonell	4	3
(Italy) O Camporese	7^{10}	4	6
(Czechoslovakia) K Nováček	6^{8}	6	1

Quarterfinals
1 WC	(United States) J Berger	6	3	5
(Spain) J Arrese	4	6	7
3	(Spain) E Sánchez	6	6
(Italy) O Camporese	2	1

Semifinals
(Spain) J Arrese	2	1
3	(Spain) E Sánchez	6	6

=== Bottom half ===
First round
5	(Austria) T Muster	4	6	7
(Netherlands) M Koevermans	6	3	5
Q	(France) F Santoro	7	6
Q	(Czechoslovakia) M Vajda	5	4
WC	(Portugal) N Marques	4	3
(Italy) P Canè	6	6
(Spain) J Aguilera	4	7^{7}	6
4	(Ecuador) A Gómez	6	6^{2}	1
8	(Spain) S Bruguera	6	6
(Czechoslovakia) M Střelba	3	3
Q	(United States) M Ozer	1	4
(Argentina) F Davín	6	6
(France) J Potier	1	6	6^{4}
(Socialist Federal Republic of Yugoslavia) G Prpić	6	1	7^{7}
(Netherlands) P Haarhuis	6	6
2	(Argentina) M Jaite	0	3

Second round
5	(Austria) T Muster	7^{7}	6
Q	(France) F Santoro	6^{3}	2
(Italy) P Canè	2	7^{7}	4
(Spain) J Aguilera	6	6^{5}	6
8	(Spain) S Bruguera	5	4
(Argentina) F Davín	7	6
(Socialist Federal Republic of Yugoslavia) G Prpić	1	2
(Netherlands) P Haarhuis	6	6

Quarterfinals
5	(Austria) T Muster	3	0
(Spain) J Aguilera	6	6
(Argentina) F Davín	6	7
(Netherlands) P Haarhuis	4	5

Semifinals
(Spain) J Aguilera	4	3
(Argentina) F Davín	6	6
