= 1991 Estoril Open – Singles =

Singles
- 1991 Estoril Open

Final
- Champion: (Spain) Sergi Bruguera
- Runner-up: (Czechoslovakia) Karel Nováček
- Score: 7–6^{(9–7)}, 6–1

Details
- Draw: 32
- Seeds: 8

Events
Singles	Doubles
← 1990 ·	Estoril Open	· 1992 →

Sergi Bruguera won in the final 7–6^{(9–7)}, 6–1, defeating Karel Nováček.

== Seeds ==
1. (Ecuador) Andrés Gómez (first round)
2. (Spain) Emilio Sánchez (first round)
3. (Russia) Andrei Chesnokov (semifinals)
4. (Russia) Andrei Cherkasov (first round)
5. (Switzerland) Marc Rosset (first round)
6. (Spain) Juan Aguilera (first round)
7. (Argentina) Karel Nováček (finals)
8. (Spain) Sergi Bruguera (champion)

== Draw ==
=== Key ===
- Q = Qualifier
- WC = Wild card
- LL = Lucky loser
- Alt = Alternate
- ITF = ITF entry
- PR = Protected ranking
- SR = Special ranking
- SE = Special exempt
- JE = Junior exempt
- JR = Junior Accelerator Programme entrant
- CO = College Accelerator Programme entrant
- NG = Next Gen Accelerator Program entrant
- w/o = Walkover
- r = Retired
- d = Defaulted

=== Finals ===
Semifinals
7	(Czechoslovakia) Karel Nováček	7	6
(Czechoslovakia) Marián Vajda	5	2
3	(Russia) Andrei Chesnokov	4	6	3
8	(Spain) Sergi Bruguera	6	2	6

Final
7	(Czechoslovakia) Karel Nováček	6^{7}	1
8	(Spain) Sergi Bruguera	7^{9}	6

=== Top half ===
First round
1	(Ecuador) A Gómez	4	3
(Haiti) R Agénor	6	6
Q	(Sweden) C Allgårdh	6	5	2
(Spain) J Sánchez	4	7	6
(Croatia) G Prpić	6	6
(Finland) A Rahunen	1	3
(Italy) O Camporese	1	3
7	(Czechoslovakia) K Nováček	6	6
4	(Russia) A Cherkasov	2	6	5
(Spain) F Clavet	6	4	7
Q	(Brazil) C Motta	5	3
(Spain) T Carbonell	7	6
(Portugal) N Marques	6	3	6
WC	(Portugal) E Couto	2	6	1
(Czechoslovakia) M Vajda	7	3	6
6	(Spain) J Aguilera	5	6	2

Second round
(Haiti) R Agénor	2^{r}
(Spain) J Sánchez	5
(Croatia) G Prpić	2	5
7	(Czechoslovakia) K Nováček	6	7
(Spain) F Clavet	6	7^{7}
(Spain) T Carbonell	2	6^{5}
(Portugal) N Marques	6	5	3
(Czechoslovakia) M Vajda	4	7	6

Quarterfinals
(Spain) J Sánchez	5	3
7	(Czechoslovakia) K Nováček	7	6
3	(Spain) F Clavet	2	6	3
(Czechoslovakia) M Vajda	6	0	6

Semifinals
7	(Czechoslovakia) K Nováček	7	6
(Czechoslovakia) M Vajda	5	2

=== Bottom half ===
First round
5	(Switzerland) M Rosset	1	6	3
(Austria) H Skoff	6	1	6
(Portugal) J Cunha Silva	4	6	1^{r}
(Australia) R Fromberg	6	4	2
(Spain) J Arrese	3	4
Q	(Switzerland) C Mezzadri	6	6
(Argentina) H de la Peña	4	2
3	(Russia) A Chesnokov	6	6
8	(Spain) S Bruguera	6	6
(Netherlands) M Koevermans	3	3
Q	(Argentina) E Bengoechea	7	4	6
(Finland) V Paloheimo	5	6	2
(Italy) R Furlan	2	7^{7}	6
(France) T Champion	6	6^{2}	1
(Netherlands) P Haarhuis	6	6
2	(Spain) E Sánchez	0	2

Second round
(Austria) H Skoff	6	6
(Australia) R Fromberg	4	2
(Switzerland) C Mezzadri	7	5	1
3	(Russia) A Chesnokov	5	7	6
8	(Spain) S Bruguera	6	6^{8}	6
Q	(Argentina) E Bengoechea	3	7^{10}	3
(Italy) R Furlan	7	6
(Netherlands) P Haarhuis	5	3

Quarterfinals
(Austria) H Skoff	3	1
3	(Russia) A Chesnokov	6	6
8	(Spain) S Bruguera	6	6
(Italy) R Furlan	1	3

Semifinals
3	(Russia) A Chesnokov	4	6	3
8	(Spain) S Bruguera	6	2	6
