= 1989 Rado Swiss Open =

- Date: 10–16 July
- Edition: 44th
- Category: Grand Prix
- Draw: 32S / 16D
- Prize money: $275,000
- Surface: Clay / outdoor
- Location: Gstaad, Switzerland

Champions

Singles
- (West Germany) Carl-Uwe Steeb

Doubles
- (Brazil) Cássio Motta / (United States) Todd Witsken
- Suisse Open Gstaad

The 1989 Rado Swiss Open, also known as the Suisse Open Gstaad, was a men's tennis tournament held on outdoor clay courts in Gstaad, Switzerland that was part of the 1989 Nabisco Grand Prix. It was the 44th edition of the tournament and was held from 10 July until 16 July 1989. Eighth-seeded Carl-Uwe Steeb won the singles title.

== Finals ==
=== Singles ===
(West Germany) Carl-Uwe Steeb defeated (Sweden) Magnus Gustafsson 6–7^{(6–8)}, 3–6, 6–2, 6–4, 6–2

- It was Steeb's only singles title of the year and the 1st of his career.

=== Doubles ===
(Brazil) Cássio Motta / (United States) Todd Witsken defeated (Czechoslovakia) Petr Korda / (Czechoslovakia) Milan Šrejber 6–4, 6–3

- It was Motta's only doubles title of the year and the 9th of his career. It was Witsken's 2nd doubles title of the year and the 6th of his career.
