= Maja Palaveršić =

Croatian tennis player

- Full name: Maja Palaveršić-Coopersmith
- Country (sports): Yugoslavia (1988–1992); Croatia (1992-2004)
- Residence: Split, Croatia
- Born: 24 March 1973 (age 52); Split
- Height: 1.75 m (5 ft 9 in)
- Turned pro: 1988
- Retired: 2004
- Plays: Right-handed (two-handed backhand)
- Prize money: $197,170

Singles
- Career record: 290–243
- Career titles: 6 ITF
- Highest ranking: No. 117 (17 September 2001)

Grand Slam singles results
- Australian Open: 1R (2001)
- French Open: Q2 (2001)
- Wimbledon: Q1 (2001, 2002)
- US Open: Q3 (2001)

Doubles
- Career record: 91–127
- Career titles: 5 ITF
- Highest ranking: No. 109 (22 July 2002)

Grand Slam doubles results
- French Open: 1R (2002)
- Wimbledon: Q2 (2001)

Maja Palaveršić-Coopersmith (born 24 March 1973) is a Croatian former tennis player that played for Yugoslavia and Croatia.

== Career highlights ==
Significant wins include victories over top 10 players like Daniela Hantuchová, Roberta Vinci and top 15 players like Kirsten Flipkens.

== Fed Cup team ==
Together with Nadin Ercegović, Gorana Matić and Maja Murić she was a member of the original Croatian Fed Cup team in 1992.

== Personal life ==
She was coached by her husband, Roy Coopersmith, with whom she has two children. Her daughter, Nicole Coopersmith, also played professional tennis and reached the highest singles ranking of world No. 475 on 7 November 2016.

== ITF Circuit finals ==
$75,000 tournaments
$50,000 tournaments
$25,000 tournaments
$10,000 tournaments

=== Singles: 10 (6–4) ===
Result	No.	Date	Tournament	Surface	Opponent	Score
Loss	1.	26 August 1991	ITF Ronchis, Italy	Clay	(Italy) Barbara Romanò	2–6, 1–6
Loss	2.	21 October 1991	ITF Lyss, Switzerland	Hard	(Switzerland) Natalie Tschan	1–6, 3–6
Loss	1.	20 September 1993	ITF Capua, Italy	Clay	(Argentina) Bettina Fulco	6–2, 4–6, 4–6
Win	2.	11 August 1996	ITF Paderborn, Germany	Clay	(Germany) Silke Frankl	6–1, 6–7, 6–3
Win	3.	22 September 1996	ITF Biograd, Croatia	Clay	(Slovakia) Zuzana Váleková	4–6, 6–2, 6–1
Win	4.	14 September 1997	ITF Sibenik, Croatia	Clay	(Croatia) Marijana Kovačević	6–2, 4–6, 6–2
Loss	5.	14 June 1998	ITF Camucia, Italy	Clay	(Italy) Alessia Lombardi	2–6, 1–6
Win	6.	3 September 2000	ITF Mostar, Bosnia and Herzegovina	Clay	(Bosnia and Herzegovina) Adriana Basarić	6–3, 7–5
Win	7.	24 September 2000	ITF Lecce, Italy	Clay	(Czech Republic) Lenka Němečková	6–2, 6–2
Loss	8.	13 May 2001	ITF Magli, Italy	Clay	(Australia) Anastasia Rodionova	2–6, 4–6
Loss	9.	21 May 2002	ITF Torino, Italy	Clay	(Hungary) Katalin Marosi	6–4, 1–6, 0–6
Win	10.	10 November 2002	ITF Villenave-d'Ornon, France	Clay (i)	(France) Capucine Rousseau	6–2, 1–6, 6–4

=== Doubles: 11 (5–6) ===
Result	No.	Date	Tournament	Surface	Partner	Opponents	Score
Loss	1.	30 October 1989	ITF Meknes, Morocco	Clay	(Croatia) Nadin Ercegović	(Denmark) Merete Balling-Stockmann (Denmark) Pernilla Sorensen	1–6, 6–2, 4–6
Loss	2.	26 August 1991	ITF Ronchis, Italy	Clay	(Czech Republic) Monika Kratochvílová	(Italy) Marzia Grossi (Italy) Barbara Romanò	4–6, 5–7
Win	3.	21 October 1991	ITF Lyss, Switzerland	Hard	(Italy) Gabriella Boschiero	(Croatia) Maja Murić (Croatia) Petra Rihtarić	3–6, 6–1, 7–5
Loss	4.	27 April 1992	ITF Riccione, Italy	Clay	(Czech Republic) Monika Kratochvílová	(Italy) Gabriella Boschiero (Czech Republic) Petra Kučová	6–3, 3–6, 1–6
Win	3.	21 June 1998	ITF Grado, Italy	Clay	(Croatia) Marijana Kovačević	(France) Vanina Casanova (Romania) Andreea Vanc	3–6, 6–3, 6–1
Loss	4.	18 June 2000	ITF Mount Pleasant, United States	Hard	(United States) Jacqueline Trail	(Australia) Melanie-Ann Clayton (Australia) Nadia Johnston	6–4, 3–6, 2–6
Win	5.	10 July 2000	ITF Getxo, Spain	Clay	(Spain) Alicia Ortuño	(Spain) Lourdes Domínguez Lino (Spain) María José Martínez Sánchez	6–1, 6–2
Loss	6.	31 July 2000	Open Saint-Gaudens, France	Clay	(Hungary) Eszter Molnár	(Bulgaria) Svetlana Krivencheva (Ukraine) Elena Tatarkova	6–3, 5–7, 3–6
Win	7.	3 September 2000	ITF Mostar, Bosnia and Herzegovina	Clay	(Croatia) Marijana Kovačević	(Poland) Magdalena Marszalek (Russia) Daria Panova	6–2, 6–0
Loss	8.	8 October 2000	ITF Makarska, Croatia	Clay	(Slovenia) Maja Matevžič	(Czech Republic) Eva Martincová (Czech Republic) Alena Vašková	2–4, 1–4, 4–2, 2–4
Loss	9.	18 June 2001	Open de Marseille, France	Clay	(France) Caroline Dhenin	(New Zealand) Leanne Baker (India) Manisha Malhotra	6–7^{(5–7)}, 2–6
Win	10.	23 April 2002	Dothan Pro Classic, United States	Clay	(Japan) Rika Fujiwara	(United States) Samantha Reeves (South Africa) Jessica Steck	6–3, 6–0
Loss	11.	9 June 2002	ITF Caserta, Italy	Clay	(Canada) Marie-Ève Pelletier	(Argentina) Erica Krauth (Brazil) Vanessa Menga	4–6, 4–6
