= Svetlana Krivencheva =

Bulgarian tennis player

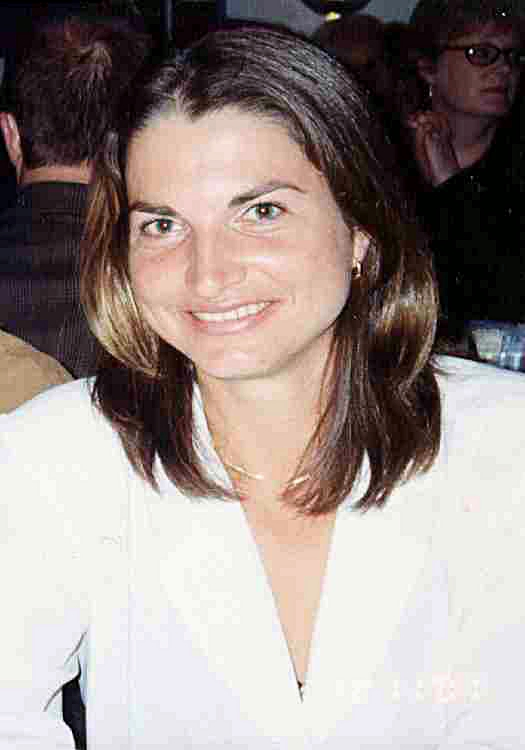
- Svetlana Krivencheva, 2006
- Country (sports): Bulgaria
- Residence: Plovdiv, Bulgaria
- Born: 30 December 1973 (age 52) Plovdiv
- Height: 1.80 m (5 ft 11 in)
- Turned pro: 1991
- Retired: 2012
- Plays: Right (two-handed backhand)
- Prize money: $349,520

Singles
- Career record: 397–455
- Career titles: 2 ITF
- Highest ranking: No. 142 (9 February 1998)

Grand Slam singles results
- Australian Open: 1R (1998)
- French Open: Q2 (2002)
- Wimbledon: Q2 (1997, 1998)
- US Open: Q3 (1998)

Doubles
- Career record: 265–280
- Career titles: 21 ITF
- Highest ranking: No. 69 (3 August 1998)

Grand Slam doubles results
- Australian Open: 3R (1997, 1998)
- French Open: 1R (1996, 1997, 1998, 2000)
- Wimbledon: 1R (1998, 2000)
- US Open: 3R (1999)

Team competitions
- Fed Cup: 2–4 (doubles 2–2)

Svetlana Krivencheva (Bulgarian: Светлана Кривенчева, born 30 December 1973) is a former tennis player from Bulgaria.

Krivencheva won two singles and 21 doubles titles on the ITF Women's Circuit in her career. On 9 February 1998, she reached her best singles ranking of 142nd in the world. On 3 August 1998, she peaked at No. 63 in doubles rankings.

Krivencheva retired from professional tennis 2012 but made a temporary return at the 2017 Central Coast Open in Templeton, California.

== ITF Circuit finals ==
=== Singles: 9 (2 titles, 7 runner–ups) ===
Legend $50,000 tournaments $25,000 tournaments $10,000 tournaments	Finals by surface Hard (1–3) Clay (1–4)

Result	W–L	Date	Tournament	Tier	Surface	Opponent	Score
Loss	0–1	Mar 1992	ITF Vilamoura, Portugal	10,000	Hard	(Russia) Elena Likhovtseva	6–4, 2–6, 6–7^{(2)}
Loss	0–2	May 1992	ITF Balaguer, Spain	10,000	Clay	(Argentina) Paola Suárez	6–3, 3–6, 0–6
Win	1–2	May 1993	ITF Sofia, Bulgaria	10,000	Clay	(Germany) Nicole Wist	4–6, 6–0, 7–5
Loss	1–3	Jul 1993	ITF Bol, Croatia	10,000	Clay	(Argentina) Laura Montalvo	0–6, 4–6
Win	2–3	Sep 1993	ITF Burgas, Bulgaria	10,000	Hard	(United Kingdom) Amanda Wainwright	6–3, 1–6, 7–6^{(3)}
Loss	2–4	Sep 1993	ITF Sofia, Bulgaria	25,000	Clay	(Belgium) Laurence Courtois	1–6, 1–6
Loss	2–5	Mar 1997	ITF Reims, France	25,000	Clay	(France) Sarah Pitkowski	5–7, 1–6
Loss	2–6	Jul 2001	ITF Mahwah, United States	50,000	Hard	(Chinese Taipei) Janet Lee	4–6, 6–7^{(5)}
Loss	2–7	Jul 2008	ITF Atlanta, United States	10,000	Hard	(United States) Amanda Fink	3–6, 2–6

=== Doubles: 41 (21 titles, 20 runner–ups) ===
Legend $75,000 tournaments $50,000 tournaments $25,000 tournaments $10,000 tournaments	Finals by surface Hard (4–5) Clay (17–12) Carpet (0–3)

Result	W–L	Date	Tournament	Tier	Surface	Partner	Opponents	Score
Win	1–0	May 1989	ITF Marathon, Greece	10,000	Clay	(Bulgaria) Dora Rangelova	(Australia) Lily Nejasmic (Australia) Mary Nejasmic	6–3, 6–4
Loss	1–1	Aug 1989	ITF Rebecq, Belgium	10,000	Clay	(Israel) Medi Dadoch	(Czechoslovakia) Ivana Jankovská (Czechoslovakia) Eva Melicharová	1–6, 3–6
Win	2–1	Apr 1991	ITF Bari, Italy	10,000	Clay	(Czechoslovakia) Monika Kratochvílová	(United States) Jennifer Fuchs (Italy) Flora Perfetti	5–7, 6–2, 7–5
Win	3–1	Feb 1992	ITF Montemor-o-Novo, Portugal	10,000	Hard	(Russia) Elena Likhovtseva	(Bulgaria) Angelina Petrova (Croatia) Petra Rihtarić	6–4, 6–4
Win	4–1	Mar 1992	ITF Vilamoura, Portugal	10,000	Hard	(Russia) Elena Likhovtseva	(Portugal) Tânia Couto (Portugal) Sofia Prazeres	6–3, 6–2
Win	5–1	May 1992	ITF Lerida, Spain	10,000	Clay	(Ukraine) Irina Sukhova	(Canada) Martina Crha (United States) Lisa Pugliese	6–1, 6–2
Win	6–1	May 1992	ITF Balaguer, Spain	10,000	Clay	(Ukraine) Irina Sukhova	(Argentina) Paola Suárez (Argentina) Pamela Zingman	4–6, 6–4, 6–4
Win	7–1	Aug 1992	ITF Rebecq, Belgium	10,000	Clay	(Russia) Elena Likhovtseva	(Israel) Nelly Barkan (Russia) Maria Marfina	7–5, 6–2
Loss	7–2	Aug 1992	ITF Koksijde, Belgium	10,000	Clay	(Poland) Agata Werblinska	(Russia) Maria Marfina (Russia) Elena Likhovtseva	3–6, 3–6
Loss	7–3	Sep 1992	ITF Burgas, Bulgaria	10,000	Clay	(Russia) Elena Likhovtseva	(Bulgaria) Galia Angelova (Bulgaria) Tzvetelina Nikolova	6–3, 4–6, 3–6
Win	8–3	Oct 1992	ITF Langenthal, Switzerland	10,000	Hard (i)	(Israel) Nelly Barkan	(Netherlands) Gaby Coorengel (Netherlands) Amy van Buuren	7–6^{(4)}, 3–6, 6–4
Win	9–3	May 1993	ITF Lerida, Spain	10,000	Clay	(Greece) Christina Zachariadou	(United Kingdom) Emily Bond (France) Caroline Toyre	6–1, 6–4
Loss	9–4	Jun 1993	ITF Zagreb, Croatia	10,000	Clay	(Belgium) Vanessa Matthys	(Croatia) Ivona Horvat (Slovenia) Tina Vukasovič	5–7, 6–4, 2–6
Loss	9–5	Jul 1993	ITF Bol, Croatia	10,000	Clay	(Croatia) Petra Rihtaric	(Argentina) Laura Montalvo (Argentina) Valentina Solari	6–3, 3–6, 5–7
Win	10–5	Sep 1993	ITF Burgas, Bulgaria	10,000	Hard	(Ukraine) Elena Tatarkova	(Sweden) Camilla Persson (Sweden) Anna-Karin Svensson	5–7, 6–2, 6–3
Loss	10–6	Oct 1994	ITF Poitiers, France	25,000	Hard (i)	(Socialist Federal Republic of Yugoslavia) Tatjana Ječmenica	(Czech Republic) Ludmila Richterová (Czech Republic) Helena Vildová	6–7, 1–6
Loss	10–7	Apr 1995	ITF Reims, France	25,000	Clay	(France) Caroline Dhenin	(Spain) Estefanía Bottini (Spain) Gala León García	6–7, 6–1, 1–6
Win	11–7	Jul 1995	ITF Darmstadt, Germany	25,000	Clay	(Czech Republic) Květa Peschke	(Poland) Magdalena Feistel (Czech Republic) Helena Vildová	7–6^{(4)}, 6–2
Win	12–7	Aug 1995	ITF Budapest, Hungary	25,000	Clay	(Socialist Federal Republic of Yugoslavia) Tatjana Ječmenica	(Poland) Magdalena Feistel (Czech Republic) Helena Vildová	6–4, 6–3
Loss	12–8	Mar 1996	ITF Prostějov, Czech Republic	50,000	Carpet (i)	(Ukraine) Olga Lugina	(Czech Republic) Denisa Chládková (Czech Republic) Helena Vildová	6–7^{(5)}, 6–4, 5–7
Win	13–8	Mar 1997	ITF Reims, France	25,000	Clay (i)	(Ukraine) Elena Tatarkova	(Germany) Silke Meier (Austria) Petra Schwarz	6–2, 6–2
Loss	13–9	Apr 1997	ITF Marathon, Greece	25,000	Clay	(Hungary) Virág Csurgó	(Zimbabwe) Cara Black (Kazakhstan) Irina Selyutina	3–6, 4–6
Win	14–9	Jul 1997	ITF Darmstadt, Germany	25,000	Clay	(Bulgaria) Pavlina Nola	(Russia) Olga Ivanova (Poland) Magdalena Feistel	6–0, 2–6, 6–3
Win	15–9	Jul 1997	ITF Rostock, Germany	25,000	Clay	(Bulgaria) Pavlina Nola	(Australia) Renee Reid (Hungary) Réka Vidáts	w/o
Win	16–9	Aug 1997	ITF Sopot, Poland	75,000	Clay	(Ukraine) Elena Tatarkova	(Czech Republic) Radka Bobková (Czech Republic) Lenka Němečková	7–6^{(9–7)}, 6–3
Loss	16–10	Aug 1997	ITF Bratislava, Slovakia	75,000	Clay	(Bulgaria) Pavlina Nola	(Belgium) Laurence Courtois (Slovakia) Henrieta Nagyová	1–6, 0–6
Loss	16–11	Nov 1997	ITF Poitiers, France	50,000	Hard (i)	(France) Lea Ghirardi	(Belgium) Nancy Feber (Czech Republic) Petra Langrová	6–3, 3–6, 1–6
Loss	16–12	Feb 1999	ITF Rogaška Slatina, Slovenia	25,000	Carpet (i)	(Czech Republic) Eva Martincová	(Slovenia) Tina Križan (Slovenia) Katarina Srebotnik	5–7, 2–6
Loss	16–13	Feb 1999	ITF Bushey, UK	25,000	Carpet (i)	(Slovenia) Tina Križan	(Switzerland) Emmanuelle Gagliardi (Hungary) Katalin Marosi	7–6^{(4)}, 2–6, 6–7^{(0)}
Win	17–13	Jul 1999	ITF Puchheim, Germany	25,000	Clay	(Czech Republic) Eva Melicharová	(Germany) Kirstin Freye (Germany) Syna Schmidle	6–2, 6–4
Win	18–13	Apr 2000	ITF Quartu Sant'Elena, Italy	10,000	Clay	(Bulgaria) Antoaneta Pandjerova	(Czech Republic) Michaela Paštiková (Czech Republic) Helena Vildová	7–5, 7–6^{(9)}
Loss	18–14	Apr 2000	ITF Maglie, Italy	25,000	Clay	(Belarus) Tatiana Poutchek	(Italy) Alice Canepa (Italy) Maria Paola Zavagli	1–6, 4–6
Loss	18–15	Apr 2000	ITF San Severo, Italy	10,000	Clay	(Romania) Oana Elena Golimbioschi	(Netherlands) Debby Haak (Netherlands) Lotty Seelen	4–6, 3–6
Loss	18–16	Jun 2000	Open de Marseille, France	50,000	Clay	(Poland) Anna Bieleń-Żarska	(Italy) Alice Canepa (Argentina) Mariana Díaz Oliva	2–6, 3–6
Win	19–16	Jul 2000	ITF Puchheim, Germany	25,000	Clay	(Czech Republic) Zuzana Váleková	(Germany) Angelika Bachmann (Austria) Melanie Schnell	7–5, 3–6, 7–5
Win	20–16	Aug 2000	Open Saint Gaudens, France	25,000	Clay	(Ukraine) Elena Tatarkova	(Hungary) Eszter Molnár (Croatia) Maja Palaveršić	3–6, 7–5, 6–3
Loss	20–17	Feb 2001	ITF Rockford, US	25,000	Hard (i)	(Ukraine) Elena Tatarkova	(United States) Katie Schlukebir (United States) Kristen Schlukebir	6–7^{(4)}, 1–6
Loss	20–18	Feb 2005	ITF Rockford, US	25,000	Hard (i)	(Brazil) Joana Cortez	(United States) Julie Ditty (Czech Republic) Vladimíra Uhlířová	6–3, 5–7, 5–7
Loss	20–19	Jul 2005	ITF College Park, US	50,000	Hard	(United States) Ashley Harkleroad	(Argentina) María José Argeri (Brazil) Letícia Sobral	4–6, 6–3, 6–7^{(1)}
Loss	20–20	Oct 2009	ITF Williamsburg, US	10,000	Clay	(Russia) Angelina Gabueva	(Brazil) Ana-Maria Moura (United States) Gira Schofield	6–3, 0–6, [6–10]
Win	21–20	Oct 2010	ITF Williamsburg, US	10,000	Clay	(Russia) Angelina Gabueva	(Georgia (country)) Salome Devidze (Georgia (country)) Magda Okruashvili	6–4, 3–6, [10–8]
