= 1991 Estoril Open – Doubles =

Doubles
- 1991 Estoril Open

Final
- Champions: (Netherlands) Paul Haarhuis (Netherlands) Mark Koevermans
- Runners-up: (Netherlands) Tom Nijssen (Czechoslovakia) Cyril Suk
- Score: 6–3, 6–3

Details
- Draw: 16
- Seeds: 4

Events
Singles	Doubles
- Estoril Open

Sergio Casal and Emilio Sánchez were the defending champions, but lost in the semifinals this year.

Paul Haarhuis and Mark Koevermans won in the final 6–3, 6–3, against Tom Nijssen and Cyril Suk.

== Seeds ==
1. (Spain) Sergio Casal / (Spain) Emilio Sánchez (semifinals)
2. (Italy) Omar Camporese / (Spain) Javier Sánchez (first round)
3. (Netherlands) Paul Haarhuis / (Netherlands) Mark Koevermans (champions)
4. (Czechoslovakia) Karel Nováček / (Czechoslovakia) Tomáš Šmíd (quarterfinals)

== Draw ==
Key

- Q = Qualifier
- WC = Wild card
- LL = Lucky loser
- Alt = Alternate
- ITF = ITF entry
- PR = Protected ranking
- SR = Special ranking
- SE = Special exempt
- JE = Junior exempt
- JR = Junior Accelerator Programme entrant
- CO = College Accelerator Programme entrant
- NG = Next Gen Accelerator Program entrant
- w/o = Walkover
- r = Retired
- d = Defaulted

=== Draw ===
First round
1	(Spain) S Casal (Spain) E Sánchez	6	6
(Ecuador) A Gómez (Brazil) C Motta	3	4
Q	(Italy) R Furlan (Switzerland) C Mezzadri	3	6	3
(Sweden) P Henricsson (Finland) O Rahnasto	6	4	6
3	(Netherlands) P Haarhuis (Netherlands) M Koevermans	6	7
(Czechoslovakia) V Flégl (Socialist Federal Republic of Yugoslavia) G Prpić	3	5
(Sweden) R Båthman (Sweden) R Bergh	5	6	7
(Argentina) H de la Peña (Netherlands) M Schapers	7	1	6
(Netherlands) T Nijssen (Czechoslovakia) C Suk	6	7
(Argentina) E Bengoechea (Spain) F Clavet	2	6
(Czechoslovakia) J Čihák (Belgium) L Pimek	4	6	4
4	(Czechoslovakia) T Nováček (Czechoslovakia) T Šmíd	6	2	6
(United States) C Beckman (United States) S Cannon	7	7
WC	(Portugal) J Cunha e Silva (Portugal) N Marques	5	5
(Spain) S Bruguera (Spain) T Carbonell	5	6	7
2	(Italy) O Camporese (Spain) J Sánchez	7	3	6

Quarterfinals
1	(Spain) S Casal (Spain) E Sánchez	7	6
(Sweden) P Henricsson (Finland) O Rahnasto	6	0
3	(Netherlands) P Haarhuis (Netherlands) M Koevermans	7	6
(Sweden) R Båthman (Sweden) R Bergh	6	2
(Netherlands) T Nijssen (Czechoslovakia) C Suk	6	6
4	(Czechoslovakia) T Nováček (Czechoslovakia) T Šmíd	3	4
(United States) C Beckman (United States) S Cannon	1	1
(Spain) S Bruguera (Spain) T Carbonell	6	6

Semifinals
1	(Spain) S Casal (Spain) E Sánchez	4	3
3	(Netherlands) P Haarhuis (Netherlands) M Koevermans	6	6
(Netherlands) T Nijssen (Czechoslovakia) C Suk	6	6
(Spain) S Bruguera (Spain) T Carbonell	2	1

Final
3	(Netherlands) P Haarhuis (Netherlands) M Koevermans	6	6
(Netherlands) T Nijssen (Czechoslovakia) C Suk	3	3
