= Sabrina Giusto =

Brazilian tennis player

- Country (sports): Brazil
- Born: 31 August 1971 (age 53)
- Prize money: $30,805

Singles
- Career record: 71–64
- Highest ranking: No. 171 (10 December 1990)

Grand Slam singles results
- French Open: Q1 (1990, 1991)

Doubles
- Career record: 21–37
- Highest ranking: No. 370 (3 September 1990)

Sabrina Giusto (born 31 August 1971) is a Brazilian former professional tennis player.

Giusto reached a best ranking of 171 in the world and twice featured in the qualifying draw for the French Open. She played Federation Cup tennis for Brazil in 1991, featuring in three ties, with her only win coming against Paraguay's Larissa Schaerer.

== ITF finals ==
$25,000 tournaments
$10,000 tournaments

=== Singles: 3 (2–1) ===
Result	No.	Date	Tournament	Surface	Opponent	Score
Win	1.	17 July 1989	Sezze, Italy	Clay	(Italy) Laura Murgo	6–1, 6–4
Win	2.	30 October 1989	Belo Horizonte, Brazil	Clay	(Brazil) Christina Rozwadowski	6–1, 6–0
Loss	1.	13 August 1990	Brasília, Brazil	Clay	(Brazil) Gisele Miró	1–6, 0–6

=== Doubles: 3 (1–2) ===
Result	No.	Date	Tournament	Surface	Partner	Opponents	Score
Loss	1.	31 August 1987	Caracas, Venezuela	Clay	(Brazil) Rita Cruz Lima	(Venezuela) Henriette Gemer (Venezuela) Andreina Schael	4–6, 1–6
Loss	2.	23 October 1989	São Paulo, Brazil	Clay	(Brazil) Maria Pilar Valls	(Argentina) Inés Gorrochategui (United States) Karen Buchholz	3–6, 6–2, 6–7
Win	1.	31 May 1993	Braga, Portugal	Hard	(Italy) Emanuela Brusati	(Japan) Miyako Ataka (Japan) Emiko Takahashi	6–2, 3–6, 6–2
