= 1989 Estoril Open =

- Date: 17–23 July
- Edition: 1st
- Category: Category 2
- Draw: 32S / 16D
- Prize money: $100,000
- Surface: Clay
- Location: Oeiras, Portugal
- Venue: Estoril Court Central

Champions

Singles
- (West Germany) Isabel Cueto

Doubles
- (Czechoslovakia) Iva Budařová / (Czechoslovakia) Regina Rajchrtová
- Estoril Open

The 1989 Estoril Open was a women's tennis tournament played on outdoor clay courts at the Estoril Court Central in Oeiras, Portugal that was part of the Category 2 tier of the 1989 WTA Tour. It was the first edition of the tournament and was held from 17 July through 23 July 1989. Third-seeded Isabel Cueto won the singles title.

== Finals ==
=== Singles ===
(West Germany) Isabel Cueto defeated (Italy) Sandra Cecchini 7–6^{(7–3)}, 6–2

- It was Cueto's 1st singles title of the year and the 3rd of her career.

=== Doubles ===
(Czechoslovakia) Iva Budařová / (Czechoslovakia) Regina Rajchrtová defeated (Argentina) Gaby Castro / (Spain) Conchita Martínez 6–2, 6–4

- It was Budařová's only title of the year and the 4th of her career. It was Rajchrtová's only title of the year and the 1st of her career.
