= Nadin Ercegović =

Yugoslav-Croatian tennis player

- Country (sports): Yugoslavia (1988–1992); Croatia (1992-1996)
- Residence: Split, Croatia
- Born: 2 February 1973 (age 52); Delft, Netherlands
- Height: 1.77 m (5 ft 10 in)
- Turned pro: 1988
- Retired: 1996
- Plays: Right-handed (two-handed backhand)
- Prize money: $138,975

Singles
- Career record: 106–104
- Career titles: 3 ITF
- Highest ranking: No. 61 (24 May 1993)

Grand Slam singles results
- Australian Open: 2R (1994)
- French Open: 1R (1993)
- Wimbledon: 1R (1993)
- US Open: 1R (1992), (1993)

Doubles
- Career record: 22–47
- Career titles: 0
- Highest ranking: No. 215 (26 July 1993)

Team competitions
- Fed Cup: 19-18

Nadin Ercegović (born 2 February 1973) is a former tennis player who played for Yugoslavia and Croatia.

== Career ==
Together with Gorana Matić, Maja Murić and Maja Palaveršić, she was a member of the original Croatian Fed Cup team in 1992. Her best singles result was reaching the second round of the 1994 Australian Open. She also won three ITF titles, in Melbourne, Marsa, and Mondorf-les-Bains, respectively.

== ITF Circuit finals ==
=== Singles: 4 (3 titles, 1 runner-up) ===
Legend $10,000 tournaments (3–1)	Finals by surface Hard (1–0) Clay (2–1)

Result	W–L	Date	Tournament	Tier	Surface	Opponent	Score
Win	1–0	Feb 1990	ITF Melbourne, Australia	10,000	Hard	(Australia) Nicole Pratt	6–1, 7–5
Win	2–0	May 1990	ITF Marsa, Malta	10,000	Clay	(Greece) Julia Apostoli	6–3, 6–2
Loss	2–1	Mar 1991	ITF Bol, Yugoslavia	10,000	Clay	(Denmark) Sofie Albinus	2–6, 4–6
Win	3–1	Jun 1991	ITF Mondorf-les-Bains, Luxembourg	10,000	Clay	(Czech Republic) Radka Bobková	7–6, 7–5

=== Doubles: 1 (runner-up) ===
Legend $10,000 tournaments (0–1)	Finals by surface Clay (0–1)

Result	W–L	Date	Tournament	Tier	Surface	Opponent	Score	
Loss	0–1	Oct 1989	ITF Meknes, Morocco	10,000	Clay	(Socialist Federal Republic of Yugoslavia) Maja Palaveršić	(Denmark) Merete Balling-Stockmann (Denmark) Pernilla Sorensen	1–6, 6–2, 4–6
