= Virág Csurgó =

Hungarian tennis player

- Country (sports): Hungary
- Born: 10 November 1972 (age 53) Siófok, Hungary
- Height: 1.72 m (5 ft 8 in)
- Prize money: $160,084

Singles
- Career record: 160–140
- Career titles: 6 ITF
- Highest ranking: No. 160 (20 November 1995)

Grand Slam singles results
- Australian Open: Q2 (1996)
- French Open: Q2 (1996)
- Wimbledon: Q3 (1995)
- US Open: Q3 (1995)

Other tournaments
- Olympic Games: 2R (1996)

Doubles
- Career record: 156–107
- Career titles: 17 ITF
- Highest ranking: No. 84 (21 September 1998)

Grand Slam doubles results
- Australian Open: 2R (1996, 2000)
- French Open: 2R (1997)
- Wimbledon: 1R (1997, 1998)
- US Open: 2R (1998)

Other doubles tournaments
- Olympic Games: 2R (1996)

Team competitions
- Fed Cup: 6–10
Medal record
Representing Hungary
Summer Universiade
Bronze medal – third place	1993 Buffalo	Mixed doubles

Virág Csurgó (born 10 November 1972) is a Hungarian former tennis player.

Csurgó won six singles and 17 doubles titles on the ITF Circuit in her career. On 20 November 1995, she reached her best singles ranking of world No. 160. On 21 September 1998, she peaked at No. 84 in the WTA doubles rankings.

Csurgó reached the second round in both women's singles and doubles at the 1996 Summer Olympics. She wasn't originally entered in the singles event but was added when another competitor had to withdraw at the last minute. With only five minutes to take the court, she arrived at the match wearing her practice shorts and a T-shirt, and went on to defeat Aleksandra Olsza before falling to Kimiko Date in the second round.

Csurgó also reached the second round in three Grand Slam doubles tournaments. She made 16 appearances for the Hungary Fed Cup team.

== ITF finals ==
$50,000 tournaments
$25,000 tournaments
$10,000 tournaments

=== Singles: 8 (6–2) ===
Result	No.	Date	Tournament	Surface	Opponent	Score
Win	1.	8 May 1989	ITF Schwarzach, Austria	Clay	(Czechoslovakia) Zuzana Witzová	4–6, 6–0, 6–2
Loss	2.	16 July 1990	ITF Spoleto, Italy	Clay	(Socialist Federal Republic of Yugoslavia) Gorana Matić	6–3, 6–7, 4–6
Win	3.	14 September 1992	ITF Santo Domingo, Dominican Republic	Clay	(Venezuela) Ninfa Marra	1–6, 7–6^{(6)}, 6–4
Win	4.	20 September 1993	ITF Rabac, Croatia	Clay	(Croatia) Ivona Horvat	6–2, 3–6, 6–3
Win	5.	27 September 1993	ITF Santo Domingo, Dominican Republic	Clay	(Ecuador) María Dolores Campana	6–3, 7–6^{(3)}
Win	6.	4 October 1993	ITF Freeport, Bahamas	Hard	(United States) Camille Benjamin	6–3, 6–4
Win	7.	11 October 1993	ITF Kingston, Jamaica	Hard	(United States) Ditta Huber	6–1, 6–3
Loss	8.	13 July 1997	ITF Puchheim, Germany	Clay	(France) Noëlle van Lottum	0–6, 2–6

=== Doubles: 29 (17–12) ===
Result	No.	Date	Tournament	Surface	Partner	Opponents	Score
Win	1.	18 July 1988	ITF Cava Tirr, Italy	Clay	(Hungary) Réka Szikszay	(Germany) Christiane Hofmann (Poland) Katarzyna Nowak	6–1, 6–1
Win	2.	24 April 1989	ITF Dubrovnik, Yugoslavia	Clay	(Hungary) Réka Szikszay	(Czechoslovakia) Nora Bajčíková (Czechoslovakia) Petra Holubová	6–0, 1–0 ret.
Loss	3.	1 May 1989	ITF Sezze, Italy	Clay	(Hungary) Nóra Köves	(Denmark) Henriette Kjær Nielsen (Switzerland) Natalie Tschan	0–6, 6–3, 3–6
Loss	4.	8 May 1989	ITF Schwarzach, Austria	Clay	(Hungary) Nóra Köves	(Netherlands) Esmir Hoogendoorn (Germany) Stefanie Rehmke	w/o
Loss	5.	9 July 1990	ITF Subiaco, Italy	Clay	(Hungary) Nóra Köves	(United States) Kylie Johnson (Socialist Federal Republic of Yugoslavia) Barbara Mulej	6–7, 0–6
Win	6.	10 June 1991	ITF Érd, Hungary	Clay	(Hungary) Andrea Temesvári	(Czechoslovakia) Petra Holubová (Czechoslovakia) Markéta Štusková	6–1, 7–5
Loss	7.	20 July 1992	ITF Kaiserslautern, Germany	Clay	(Germany) Saskia Zink	(Germany) Henrike Kadzidroga (Germany) Eva-Maria Schürhoff	6–2, 5–7, 3–6
Win	8.	7 September 1992	ITF Kingston, Jamaica	Hard	(Chile) Macarena Miranda	(Peru) Gianfranca Devercelli (United States) Tracy Schroeder	6–4, 6–2
Win	9.	14 September 1992	ITF Santo Domingo, Dominican Republic	Clay	(Chile) Macarena Miranda	(Peru) Gianfranca Devercelli (United States) Tracy Schroeder	6–4, 4–6, 6–1
Loss	10.	15 February 1993	ITF Amadora, Portugal	Hard	(Bulgaria) Teodora Nedeva	(Netherlands) Lara Bitter (Netherlands) Maaike Koutstaal	0–6, 6–3, 2–6
Loss	11.	29 March 1993	ITF Marsa, Malta	Clay	(Slovenia) Tjaša Jezernik	(Czech Republic) Klára Bláhová (Croatia) Maja Murić	3–6, 7–5, 3–6
Win	12.	27 September 1993	ITF Santo Domingo, Dominican Republic	Clay	(Colombia) Ximena Rodríguez	(Ecuador) María Dolores Campana (Ecuador) Nuria Niemes	6–4, 6–1
Win	13.	11 October 1993	ITF Kingston, Jamaica	Hard	(Hungary) Zsofia Csapó	(United States) Allison Kinsey (United States) Kelly Story	6–1, 6–1
Loss	14.	15 May 1994	ITF Budapest, Hungary	Clay	(Hungary) Andrea Temesvári	(Czech Republic) Eva Melicharová (Czech Republic) Helena Vildová	2–6, 4–6
Win	15.	12 June 1994	ITF Caserta, Italy	Clay	(Italy) Flora Perfetti	(Japan) Mami Donoshiro (Japan) Kyōko Nagatsuka	6–1, 7–5
Win	16.	31 October 1994	ITF Montevideo, Uruguay	Clay	(Hungary) Petra Mandula	(South Africa) Nannie de Villiers (Brazil) Ana Paula Zannoni	6–4, 7–5
Win	17.	7 November 1994	ITF Buenos Aires, Argentina	Clay	(Hungary) Petra Mandula	(South Africa) Nannie de Villiers (Argentina) Laura Montalvo	6–3, 6–3
Win	18.	14 November 1994	ITF La Plata, Argentina	Clay	(Hungary) Petra Mandula	(Slovakia) Patrícia Marková (Japan) Yuka Tanaka	7–6^{(3)}, 7–5
Loss	19.	25 February 1996	ITF Bogotá, Colombia	Clay	(Czech Republic) Kateřina Kroupová-Šišková	(Greece) Christína Papadáki (Argentina) Mercedes Paz	6–7, 2–6
Win	20.	10 June 1996	ITF Budapest, Hungary	Clay	(Hungary) Nóra Köves	(Spain) Ángeles Montolio (Colombia) Fabiola Zuluaga	5–7, 7–5, 6–2
Loss	21.	23 September 1996	ITF Bucharest, Romania	Clay	(Russia) Julia Lutrova	(Germany) Anca Barna (Germany) Adriana Barna	6–4, 1–6, 0–6
Loss	22.	7 April 1997	ITF Athens, Greece	Clay	(Bulgaria) Svetlana Krivencheva	(Zimbabwe) Cara Black (Kazakhstan) Irina Selyutina	3–6, 4–6
Win	23.	28 September 1997	ITF Bucharest, Romania	Clay	(Slovakia) Janette Husárová	(Belarus) Olga Glouschenko (Belarus) Tatiana Poutchek	6–0, 6–0
Loss	24.	19 October 1997	ITF Flensburg, Germany	Carpet (i)	(Germany) Kirstin Freye	(Austria) Patricia Wartusch (Germany) Jasmin Wöhr	3–6, 6–3, 3–6
Win	25.	21 February 1998	ITF Redbridge, United Kingdom	Hard (i)	(Ukraine) Elena Tatarkova	(Germany) Kirstin Freye (Israel) Hila Rosen	7–5, 6–3
Win	26.	6 July 1998	ITF Puchheim, Germany	Clay	(Hungary) Nóra Köves	(Germany) Silke Meier (Germany) Jasmin Wöhr	4–6, 6–0, 6–3
Loss	27.	13 July 1998	ITF Darmstadt, Germany	Clay	(Hungary) Nóra Köves	(Belgium) Laurence Courtois (France) Noëlle van Lottum	5–7, 2–6
Win	28.	9 July 2000	ITF Stuttgart, Germany	Clay	(Czech Republic) Eva Martincová	(Germany) Andrea Glass (Germany) Jasmin Wöhr	6–2, 2–6, 6–4
Win	29.	24 July 2000	ITF Liège, Belgium	Clay	(Hungary) Petra Mandula	(Spain) Eva Bes (Spain) Gisela Riera	7–6^{(3)}, 6–1
