= Ágnes Gee =

Hungarian tennis player (born 1974)

- Full name: Ágnes Gee (nee Muzamel)
- Country (sports): Hungary
- Born: 29 August 1974 (age 52) Budapest, Hungary
- Prize money: $5,972

Singles
- Career record: 25–24
- Career titles: 0
- Highest ranking: No. 466 (12 September 1994)

Doubles
- Career record: 9–3
- Career titles: 2 ITF
- Highest ranking: No. 423 (15 May 1995)

Team competitions
- Fed Cup: 5–3

Ágnes Gee (born 29 August 1974), previously known as Ágnes Muzamel, is a Hungarian former professional tennis player.

Gee, who was born in Budapest, appeared in seven Federation Cup ties for Hungary in the early 1990s, while competing on the professional tour.

From 1996 to 1999, she played college tennis for the University of Mississippi (Ole Miss). A four-time All-American, she was an NCAA singles quarterfinalist in 1998. She is a member of the Ole Miss Athletics Hall of Fame.

== ITF Circuit finals ==
$25,000 tournaments
$10,000 tournaments

=== Doubles: 2 (2 titles) ===
Result	No.	Date	Tournament	Surface	Partner	Opponents	Score
Win	1.	6 June 1994	ITF Murska, Slovenia	Clay	(Argentina) Florencia Cianfagna	(Slovakia) Simona Galiková (Slovakia) Magdaléna Garguláková	6–3, 5–7, 6–1
Win	2.	7 November 1994	ITF Giza, Egypt	Clay	(Greece) Christina Zachariadou	(France) Amélie Cocheteux (France) Caroline Toyre	6–7^{(6–8)}, 6–2, 6–3

== See also ==
- List of Hungary Fed Cup team representatives
