= 1991 Estoril Open =

- Date: 1–8 April
- Edition: 2nd
- Category: World Series
- Draw: 32S / 16D
- Prize money: $337,500
- Surface: Clay / outdoor
- Location: Oeiras, Portugal

Champions

Singles
- (Spain) Sergi Bruguera

Doubles
- (Netherlands) Paul Haarhuis / (Netherlands) Mark Koevermans
- Estoril Open

The 1991 Estoril Open was a tennis tournament played on outdoor clay courts. This event was the 2nd edition of the Estoril Open, included in the 1991 ATP Tour World Series. The event took place at the Estoril Court Central, in Oeiras, Portugal, from 1 April until 8 April 1991.

== Finals ==
=== Singles ===
(Spain) Sergi Bruguera defeated (Czechoslovakia) Karel Nováček, 7–6^{(9–7)}, 6–1

- It was Bruguera's 1st singles title of his career.

=== Doubles ===
(Netherlands) Paul Haarhuis / (Netherlands) Mark Koevermans defeated (Netherlands) Tom Nijssen / (Czechoslovakia) Cyril Suk, 6–3, 6–3

- It was Haarhuis' 1st title of the year and 2nd of his career. It was Koevermans' 1st title of his career.
