= Christina Zachariadou =

Greek tennis player

- Country (sports): Greece
- Born: 28 August 1974 (age 51) Athens
- Turned pro: 1990
- Retired: 2004
- Plays: Right-handed (two-handed backhand)
- Prize money: $44,607

Singles
- Career record: 146–128
- Career titles: 3 ITF
- Highest ranking: 358 (20 October 2003)

Other tournaments
- Olympic Games: 1R (1992, 1996, 2004)

Doubles
- Career record: 134–82
- Career titles: 12 ITF
- Highest ranking: 186 (11 September 1995)

Team competitions
- Fed Cup: 26–27

Christina Zachariadou (Greek: Χριστίνα Ζαχαριάδου; born 28 August 1974) is a retired Greek tennis player.

In her career, she won three singles titles and twelve doubles titles on the ITF Circuit. On 20 October 2003, she reached her best singles ranking of world No. 358. On 11 September 1995, she peaked at No. 186 in the doubles rankings.

Zachariadou competed in the women's doubles tournament of the 1992 Summer Olympics in Barcelona, 1996 Summer Olympics in Atlanta, and at the 2004 Summer Olympics in Athens.

Playing for Greece in Fed Cup, Zachariadou started in 1990 and accumulated a win–loss record of 26–27.

== ITF Circuit finals ==
Legend
$50,000 tournaments
$40,000 tournaments
$25,000 tournaments
$10,000 tournaments

=== Singles: 8 (3–5) ===
Result	No.	Date	Tournament	Surface	Opponent	Score
Loss	1.	15 April 1991	ITF Athens, Greece	Clay	(Netherlands) Yvonne Grubben	0–6, 1–6
Loss	2.	2 May 1994	ITF Lee-on-the-Solent, United Kingdom	Clay	(Australia) Angie Woolcock	3–6, 4–6
Loss	3.	1 August 1994	ITF Casablanca, Morocco	Clay	(France) Anne-Gaëlle Sidot	1–6, 5–7
Loss	4.	7 November 1994	ITF Giza, Egypt	Clay	(Romania) Daniela Ivana	1–6, 3–6
Win	1.	3 April 1995	ITF Athens, Greece	Clay	(Spain) Rosa María Andrés Rodríguez	6–0, 3–6, 6–2
Win	2.	26 August 2001	ITF Volos, Greece	Carpet	(Bulgaria) Biljana Pawlowa-Dimitrova	6–0, 6–0
Win	3.	30 June 2002	ITF Thessaloniki, Greece	Clay	(New Zealand) Shelley Stephens	6–4, 3–6, 6–4
Loss	5.	25 May 2003	ITF Catania, Italy	Clay	(Brazil) Larissa Carvalho	1–6, 0–4 ret.

=== Doubles: 27 (12–15) ===
Result	No.	Date	Tournament	Surface	Partner	Opponents	Score
Loss	1.	15 April 1991	ITF Athens, Greece	Clay	(Canada) Suzanne Italiano	(Sweden) Catarina Bernstein (Sweden) Annika Narbe	7–5, 5–7, 5–7
Loss	2.	17 June 1991	ITF Aveiro, Portugal	Hard	(Portugal) Sofia Prazeres	(United States) Kristine Jonkosky (Republic of Ireland) Siobhán Nicholson	0–6, 6–2, 2–6
Loss	3.	29 July 1991	ITF A Coruña, Spain	Clay	(Netherlands) Hanneke Ketelaars	(Israel) Nelly Barkan (Ukraine) Olga Lugina	6–7^{(4–7)}, 3–6
Win	1.	21 October 1991	ITF Freeport, Bahamas	Hard	(Netherlands) Hellas ter Riet	(Netherlands) Aafje Evers (Netherlands) Yvonne Klompenhouver	3–6, 6–4, 6–2
Win	2.	4 November 1991	ITF Santo Domingo, Dominican Republic	Clay	(Netherlands) Claire Wegink	(Netherlands) Aafje Evers (Netherlands) Yvonne Klompenhouver	6–4, 6–4
Win	3.	10 August 1992	ITF Munich, Germany	Clay	(Croatia) Ivona Horvat	(Germany) Renata Kochta (Germany) Caroline Schneider	6–4, 3–6, 6–2
Loss	4.	28 September 1992	Athens, Greece	Clay	(Greece) Christína Papadáki	(Netherlands) Evelyne Dullens (Sweden) Anneli Ornstedt	2–6, 4–6
Win	4.	26 April 1993	Lerida, Spain	Clay	(Bulgaria) Svetlana Krivencheva	(United Kingdom) Emily Bond (France) Caroline Toyre	6–1, 6–4
Win	5.	13 September 1993	Bogotá, Colombia	Clay	(Ecuador) María Dolores Campana	(Paraguay) Magalí Benítez (Chile) Bárbara Castro	6–3, 6–2
Loss	5.	8 August 1994	Carthage, Tunisia	Clay	(United Kingdom) Michele Mair	(Germany) Cora Hofmann (Austria) Martina Schaller	4–6, 3–6
Win	6.	7 November 1994	Giza, Egypt	Clay	(Hungary) Ágnes Muzamel	(France) Amélie Cocheteux (Chile) Caroline Toyre	6–7^{(6–8)}, 6–2, 6–3
Win	7.	30 January 1995	Istanbul, Turkey	Hard	(United States) Corina Morariu	(Bulgaria) Dora Djilianova (Bulgaria) Desislava Topalova	6–3, 7–5
Loss	6.	3 April 1995	Athens	Clay	(United States) Corina Morariu	(Czech Republic) Denisa Chládková (Slovakia) Patrícia Marková	2–6, 5–7
Loss	7.	5 June 1995	Łódź, Poland	Clay	(Bulgaria) Teodora Nedeva	(Russia) Evgenia Kulikovskaya (Ukraine) Natalia Nemchinova	7–6^{(7–2)}, 3–6, 3–6
Win	8.	14 August 1995	Carthage, Tunisia	Clay	(United States) Corina Morariu	(Czech Republic) Denisa Chládková (Belgium) Daphne van de Zande	6–4, 7–6^{(9–7)}
Loss	8.	28 August 1995	Athens	Clay	(United States) Corina Morariu	(Poland) Magdalena Grzybowska (Slovakia) Henrieta Nagyová	w/o
Loss	9.	24 January 2002	Båstad, Sweden	Hard (i)	(Romania) Liana Ungur	(Hungary) Eszter Molnár (Sweden) Aleksandra Srndovic	6–2, 2–6, 5–7
Loss	10.	5 May 2002	Bournemouth, England	Clay	(Turkey) İpek Şenoğlu	(United Kingdom) Anna Hawkins (United Kingdom) Jane O'Donoghue	0–6, 0–6
Win	9.	29 June 2002	Thessaloniki, Greece	Clay	(Slovenia) Kim Kambic	(Serbia and Montenegro) Ana Četnik (Serbia and Montenegro) Daniela Berček	7–5, 6–4
Win	10.	28 July 2002	Algiers, Algeria	Clay	(India) Rushmi Chakravarthi	(Greece) Asimina Kaplani (Greece) Maria Pavlidou	6–2, 6–2
Win	11.	8 March 2003	ITF Nuevo Laredo, Mexico	Hard	(United Kingdom) Helen Crook	(Germany) Caroline-Ann Basu (France) Kildine Chevalier	6–3, 4–6, 6–2
Win	12.	22 March 2003	ITF Monterrey, Mexico	Hard	(United Kingdom) Helen Crook	(Germany) Caroline-Ann Basu (France) Kildine Chevalier	6–2, 6–0
Loss	11.	12 April 2003	ITF Coatzacoalcos, Mexico	Hard	(United Kingdom) Helen Crook	(Argentina) Erica Krauth (Australia) Sarah Stone	4–6, 6–4, 4–6
Loss	12.	24 May 2003	ITF Catania, Italy	Clay	(France) Aurélie Védy	(Brazil) Bruna Colósio (Brazil) Joana Cortez	1–6, 1–6
Loss	13.	5 July 2003	ITF Mont-de-Marsan, France	Clay	(France) Kildine Chevalier	(Spain) Paula García (Spain) María José Martínez Sánchez	4–6, 5–7
Loss	14.	24 August 2003	ITF San Marino	Clay	(France) Kildine Chevalier	(Romania) Oana Elena Golimbioschi (France) Aurélie Védy	6–2, 6–7^{(7–9)}, 4–6
Loss	15.	24 January 2004	ITF Manama, Bahrain	Hard	(Portugal) Frederica Piedade	(Russia) Raissa Gourevitch (Russia) Ekaterina Kozhokina	4–6, 4–6
