= Tânia Couto =

Portuguese tennis player (born 1972)

- Country (sports): Portugal
- Born: 5 July 1972 (age 52)
- Prize money: $16,757

Singles
- Career titles: 0
- Highest ranking: No. 345 (12 April 1993)

Doubles
- Career titles: 1 ITF
- Highest ranking: No. 298 (8 March 1993)

Tânia Couto (born 5 July 1972) is a Portuguese former professional tennis player.

Couto won Portugal's national singles championships in 1989 and was also a seven-time national doubles champion.

On the professional tour, Couto reached a best singles ranking of 345 and featured in the main draw of the 1990 Estoril Open. As a member of Portugal's Federation Cup team in 1991 and 1992 she registered wins in three singles and four doubles rubbers.

Couto's younger brother Emanuel played on the ATP Tour.

Since retiring from tennis she has commentated on the sport for Portuguese television and plays padel competitively.

== ITF finals ==
=== Singles: 1 (0–1) ===
Result	Date	Tournament	Surface	Opponent	Score
Loss	May 1991	Tortosa, Spain	Clay	(Spain) Marta Cruells-Lopez	2–6, 5–7

=== Doubles: 2 (1–1) ===
Result	Date	Tournament	Surface	Partner	Opponents	Score
Win	Jun 1991	Vale do Lobo, Portugal	Clay	(Brazil) Tatiana Buss	(Brazil) Alessandra Kaul (Brazil) Christina Rozwadowski	6–1, 1–6, 7–5
Loss	Feb 1992	Vilamoura, Portugal	Hard	(Portugal) Sofia Prazeres	(Bulgaria) Svetlana Krivencheva (Russia) Elena Likhovtseva	3–6, 2–6
