= 1990 Estoril Open =

- Date: 2–8 April (men); 16–22 July (women)
- Edition: 1st(ATP) / 2nd(WTA)
- Category: ATP World Series (men); Tier V (women)
- Draw: 32S/16D
- Prize money: $225,000 (men) $100,000 (women)
- Surface: Clay / outdoor
- Location: Oeiras, Portugal
- Venue: Estoril Court Central

Champions

Men's singles
- (Spain) Emilio Sánchez

Women's singles
- (Italy) Federica Bonsignori

Men's doubles
- (Spain) Sergio Casal / (Spain) Emilio Sánchez

Women's doubles
- (Italy) Sandra Cecchini / (Argentina) Patricia Tarabini
- Estoril Open

The 1990 Estoril Open was a combined men's and women's tennis tournament played on outdoor red clay courts. It was the first edition of the event Estoril Open for men (the 2nd for women), and was part of the ATP World Series of the 1990 ATP Tour. It took place at the Estoril Court Central, in Oeiras, Portugal, from 2 April through 8 April 1990 for the men's tournament and from 16 July through 22 July 1990 for the women's tournament. Emilio Sánchez and Federica Bonsignori won the singles titles.

== Finals ==
=== Men's singles ===
(Spain) Emilio Sánchez defeated (Argentina) Franco Davín 6–3, 6–1

- It was Sánchez's second singles title of the year, and the 11th of his career.

=== Women's singles ===
(Italy) Federica Bonsignori defeated (Italy) Laura Garrone 2–6, 6–3, 6–3

- It was Bonsignori's only singles title of her career.

=== Men's doubles ===
(Spain) Sergio Casal / (Spain) Emilio Sánchez defeated (Italy) Omar Camporese / (Italy) Paolo Canè 7–5, 4–6, 7–5

- It was Casal's first doubles title of the year, and the 25th of his career.
- It was Sánchez's second doubles title of the year, and the 28th of his career.

=== Women's doubles ===
(Italy) Sandra Cecchini / (Argentina) Patricia Tarabini defeated (Netherlands) Carin Bakkum / (Netherlands) Nicole Jagerman 1–6, 6–2, 6–3
