= Sofia Prazeres =

Portuguese tennis player (born 1974)

- Country (sports): Portugal
- Born: 19 June 1974 (age 50); Porto, Portugal
- Prize money: $85,935

Singles
- Career titles: 1 ITF
- Highest ranking: No. 152 (9 June 1997)

Doubles
- Career titles: 6 ITF
- Highest ranking: No. 171 (5 May 1997)

Sofia Prazeres (born 19 June 1974) is a former professional tennis player from Portugal.

== Biography ==
Born in Porto, Prazeres started playing tennis at the age of seven.

Prazeres debuted on the WTA Tour as a 16 year old at the 1990 Estoril Open, featuring in both the singles and doubles draws. In 1991, she began representing Portugal in Fed Cup competition and went on to become the most capped player in the team's history, with 30 wins from 49 matches. She made main draw appearances in singles at the 1995 Moscow Ladies Open and the 1997 Styrian Open. After making it to the final round of qualifying at the 1997 French Open, she reached her highest singles ranking of 152 in the world. This was the highest rank attained by a female player from Portugal until surpassed by Frederica Piedade.

She retired in 1998, soon after winning Portugal's national championship for the ninth successive year.

== ITF finals ==
$25,000 tournaments
$10,000 tournaments

=== Singles: 9 (1–8) ===
Result	No.	Date	Tournament	Surface	Opponent	Score
Loss	1.	17 June 1991	Covilhã, Portugal	Clay	(Bulgaria) Galia Angelova	6–3, 4–6, 1–6
Loss	2.	8 February 1993	Faro, Portugal	Hard	(Spain) Gala León García	3–6, 3–6
Loss	3.	21 February 1994	Valencia, Spain	Clay	(Spain) Ángeles Montolio	3–6, 0–6
Loss	4.	12 September 1994	Sofia, Bulgaria	Clay	(Czech Republic) Kateřina Kroupová-Šišková	3–6, 3–6
Loss	5.	3 July 1995	Sezze, Italy	Clay	(Italy) Marzia Grossi	3–6, 2–6
Loss	6.	1 July 1996	Stuttgart, Germany	Clay	(Germany) Sandra Klösel	6–2, 6–7, 3–6
Loss	7.	7 April 1997	Athens, Greece	Hard (i)	(Spain) María Sánchez Lorenzo	7–6^{(7)}, 1–6, 6–7^{(4)}
Win	8.	21 April 1997	Guimarães, Portugal	Hard	(United States) Keirsten Alley	6–3, 6–1
Loss	9.	9 February 1998	Faro, Portugal	Hard	(Spain) Paula Hermida	4–6, 4–6

=== Doubles: 11 (6–5) ===
Result	No.	Date	Tournament	Surface	Partner	Opponents	Score
Loss	1.	17 June 1991	Aveiro, Portugal	Hard	(Greece) Christina Zachariadou	(United States) Kristine Jonkosky (Republic of Ireland) Siobhán Nicholson	0–6, 6–2, 2–6
Loss	2.	24 February 1992	Vilamoura, Portugal	Hard	(Portugal) Tânia Couto	(Bulgaria) Svetlana Krivencheva (Russia) Elena Likhovtseva	3–6, 2–6
Win	3.	12 July 1993	Vigo, Spain	Clay	(Argentina) María Fernanda Landa	(Netherlands) Petra Kamstra (Netherlands) Linda Niemantsverdriet	7–6^{(6)}, 3–6, 7–6^{(5)}
Win	4.	19 July 1993	Bilbao, Spain	Clay	(Argentina) María Fernanda Landa	(Spain) Silvia Ramón-Cortés (Spain) Inmaculada Varas	6–4, 6–4
Win	5.	6 June 1994	Elvas, Portugal	Hard	(Belgium) Ann Devries	(Austria) Désirée Leupold (Spain) Janet Souto	6–2, 4–6, 7–5
Loss	6.	16 June 1996	Salzburg, Austria	Clay	(Switzerland) Emmanuelle Gagliardi	(Spain) Alicia Ortuño (Argentina) Veronica Stele	0–6, 4–6
Win	7.	8 September 1996	Spoleto, Italy	Clay	(Brazil) Miriam D'Agostini	(Spain) Alicia Ortuño (Dominican Republic) Joelle Schad	6–4, 6–4
Win	8.	13 January 1997	Pontevedra, Spain	Hard (i)	(Spain) Alicia Ortuño	(Italy) Tathiana Garbin (Italy) Sara Ventura	4–6, 6–1, 6–4
Win	9.	20 January 1997	Orense, Spain	Hard (i)	(Spain) Alicia Ortuño	(Netherlands) Linda Sentis (Netherlands) Susanne Trik	6–2, 6–3
Loss	10.	16 February 1997	Cali, Colombia	Clay	(Paraguay) Larissa Schaerer	(Australia) Rachel McQuillan (Germany) Syna Schmidle	2–6, 3–6
Loss	11.	9 February 1998	Faro, Portugal	Hard	(United Kingdom) Abigail Tordoff	(Czech Republic) Nikola Hübnerová (Slovakia) Alena Paulenková	2–6, 2–6
