= Mark Ozer =

American tennis player

- Country (sports): United States
- Born: 16 June 1964 (age 62) Silver Spring, Maryland, U.S.
- Height: 6 ft 5 in (196 cm)
- Prize money: $15,459

Singles
- Career record: 0–1
- Highest ranking: No. 474 (May 15, 1989)

Doubles
- Career record: 3–10
- Highest ranking: No. 155 (July 24, 1989)

Mark Ozer (born 16 June 1964) is an American former professional tennis player.

Ozer, the son of a neurologist, grew up around Washington, D.C., and played tennis for Princeton University, while studying for a history degree between 1982 and 1986.

In 1987 he turned professional and went on to reach a career high singles ranking of 474. Most of his main draw appearances at Grand Prix/ATP Tour level were as a doubles player and he won a Challenger title in doubles at Jerusalem in 1989. He had a best doubles ranking of 155 in the world.

== Challenger titles ==
=== Doubles: (1) ===
No.	Date	Tournament	Surface	Partner	Opponents	Score
1.	April 16, 1989	Jerusalem, Israel	Hard	(Venezuela) Alfonso Mora	(United Kingdom) Nick Brown (United Kingdom) Nick Fulwood	6–3, 6–4
