= Bulgaria Billie Jean King Cup team =

Bulgarian national women's tennis team

Bulgaria
- Captain: Magdalena Maleeva
- Nations Ranking: 44 (17 November 2025)
- Colors: White & Green
- First year: 1966
- Years played: 47
- Ties played (W–L): 159 (76-83)
- Years in World Group: 17 (17-17)
- Best finish: World Group SF (1985, 1987)
- Most total wins: Katerina Maleeva (29-22); Tsvetana Pironkova (29-26)
- Most singles wins: Tsvetana Pironkova (22-17)
- Most doubles wins: Isabella Shinikova (10-12)
- Best doubles team: Katerina Maleeva / Manuela Maleeva (5-7)
- Most ties played: Tsvetana Pironkova (39)
- Most years played: Tsvetana Pironkova (13)

The Bulgaria women's national tennis team (Bulgarian: Отбор на България за Фед Къп, romanized: Otbor na Balgariya za Fed Kap) represents Bulgaria in Billie Jean King Cup tennis competition and are governed by the Bulgarian Tennis Federation.

== History ==
Bulgaria competed in its first Fed Cup in 1966. Until the 1996 edition of the competition the team has always played in the Fed Cup World Group. From 1996 the team is competing in Group I of the Europe/Africa Zone.

The best results of the Bulgarian Fed Cup team are the semifinals the team played in 1985 and 1987. The team also reached the quarterfinals of the competition in 1968, 1984, 1986, 1989, 1992 and 1994. These results are closely connected with the success of the Maleeva sisters (Magdalena Maleeva, Katerina Maleeva and Manuela Maleeva) who have represented Bulgaria for more than 20 years in the competition.

In 2023, Bulgaria competed in the Europe/Africa Zone Group I event in Antalya, where they finished in third place in Pool B of the competition. The team ended the group stage with a 3-2 W/L ratio after defeating Croatia, Sweden and Denmark and successfully maintained their place in the Europe/Africa Zone Group I until 2024.

In 2024, Bulgaria competed in the Europe/Africa Zone Group I event in Oeiras, where they finished in last place in Pool A of the competition with only one win against Austria. In the play-offs the team proceeded to beat Norway, but then lost out to Portugal and was relegated to Europe/Africa Zone Group II for the upcoming 2025 edition.

== Current team ==
Player information and rankings as of 9 November 2026

The following players were called up for the 2026 Billie Jean King Cup Europe/Africa Zone Group II in April 2026.

Player	WTA Rank	First year played	Total Win/Loss	Singles Win/Loss	Doubles Win/Loss
Elizara Yaneva	139	2026	7–0	4–0	3–0
Rositsa Dencheva	202	2022	7–3	4–1	3–2
Denislava Glushkova	479	2023	4–3	4–2	0–1
Lidia Encheva	450	2025	2–1	1–0	1–1

Recent callups

Player	Most recent appearance
Lia Karatancheva	2025 Billie Jean King Cup Europe/Africa Zone II, Play-offs
Isabella Shinikova	2025 Billie Jean King Cup Europe/Africa Zone II, Play-offs
Viktoriya Tomova	2024 Billie Jean King Cup Europe/Africa Zone, Play-offs
Gergana Topalova	2024 Billie Jean King Cup Europe/Africa Zone, Play-offs

== Recent performances ==
Here is the list of all match-ups since 1995, when the competition started being held in the current World Group format.

=== 1990s ===
Year	Competition	Date	Location	Opponent	Score	Result
1995	World Group I, 1st round	22–23 April	Sofia (BUL)	Spain	2–3	Loss
1995	World Group I, Play-offs	22–23 July	Bloemfontein (RSA)	South Africa	0–5	Loss
1996	World Group II, 1st round	27–28 April	Plovdiv (BUL)	Slovakia	0–5	Loss
1996	World Group II, Play-offs	13–14 July	Plovdiv (BUL)	South Korea	1–4	Loss
1997	Europe/Africa Group I, Round Robin	23 April	Bari (ITA)	Russia	1–2	Loss
1997	Europe/Africa Group I, Round Robin	24 April	Bari (ITA)	Greece	1–2	Loss
1998	Europe/Africa Group I, Round Robin	14 April	Murcia (ESP)	Romania	1–2	Loss
1998	Europe/Africa Group I, Round Robin	15 April	Murcia (ESP)	South Africa	1–2	Loss
1998	Europe/Africa Group I, Round Robin	16 April	Murcia (ESP)	Latvia	1–2	Loss
1999	Europe/Africa Group I, Round Robin	19 April	Murcia (ESP)	Yugoslavia	3–0	Win
1999	Europe/Africa Group I, Round Robin	20 April	Murcia (ESP)	Finland	3–0	Win
1999	Europe/Africa Group I, Round Robin	21 April	Murcia (ESP)	Great Britain	1–2	Loss
1999	Europe/Africa Group I, Play-Off	22 April	Murcia (ESP)	Slovenia	1–2	Loss

=== 2000s ===
Year	Competition	Date	Location	Opponent	Score	Result
2000	Europe/Africa Group I, Round Robin	16 May	Murcia (ESP)	Sweden	2–1	Win
2000	Europe/Africa Group I, Round Robin	17 May	Murcia (ESP)	Turkey	3–0	Win
2000	Europe/Africa Group I, Round Robin	18 May	Murcia (ESP)	Netherlands	0–3	Loss
2001	Europe/Africa Group I, Round Robin	23 May	Murcia (ESP)	Greece	1–2	Loss
2001	Europe/Africa Group I, Round Robin	24 May	Murcia (ESP)	Israel	1–2	Loss
2001	Europe/Africa Group I, Round Robin	25 May	Murcia (ESP)	Denmark	2–1	Win
2001	Europe/Africa Group I, Round Robin	26 May	Murcia (ESP)	Luxembourg	1–2	Loss
2002	Europe/Africa Group I, Round Robin	24 April	Antalya (TUR)	Portugal	2–1	Win
2002	Europe/Africa Group I, Round Robin	25 April	Antalya (TUR)	Georgia	2–1	Win
2002	Europe/Africa Group I, Round Robin	26 April	Antalya (TUR)	Estonia	2–1	Win
2002	Europe/Africa Group I, Promotional Play-off	27 April	Antalya (TUR)	Ukraine	1–2	Loss
2003	Europe/Africa Group I, Round Robin	21 April	Estoril (POR)	Georgia	2–1	Win
2003	Europe/Africa Group I, Round Robin	22 April	Estoril (POR)	Yugoslavia	1–2	Loss
2003	Europe/Africa Group I, Round Robin	23 April	Estoril (POR)	Israel	2–1	Win
2004	Europe/Africa Group I, Round Robin	19 April	Athens (GRE)	Estonia	1–2	Loss
2004	Europe/Africa Group I, Round Robin	21 April	Athens (GRE)	Greece	2–1	Win
2004	Europe/Africa Group I, Round Robin	22 April	Athens (GRE)	Poland	2–1	Win
2004	Europe/Africa Group I, Promotional Play-off	24 April	Athens (GRE)	Serbia and Montenegro	2–1	Win
2004	World Group I, Play-offs	11 July	Plovdiv (BUL)	Japan	2–3	Loss
2005	Europe/Africa Group I, Round Robin	20 April	Antalya (TUR)	South Africa	3–0	Win
2005	Europe/Africa Group I, Round Robin	21 April	Antalya (TUR)	Hungary	2–1	Win
2005	Europe/Africa Group I, Round Robin	22 April	Antalya (TUR)	Estonia	3–0	Win
2005	Europe/Africa Group I, Promotional Play-off	23 April	Antalya (TUR)	Netherlands	2–0	Win
2005	World Group II, Play-offs	10 July	Tokyo (JPN)	Japan	1–4	Loss
2006	Europe/Africa Group I, Round Robin	18 April	Plovdiv (BUL)	Hungary	1–2	Loss
2006	Europe/Africa Group I, Round Robin	19 April	Plovdiv (BUL)	Great Britain	1–2	Loss
2006	Europe/Africa Group I, Round Robin	20 April	Plovdiv (BUL)	Ukraine	2–1	Win
2007	Europe/Africa Group I, Round Robin	18 April	Plovdiv (BUL)	Great Britain	0–3	Loss
2007	Europe/Africa Group I, Round Robin	19 April	Plovdiv (BUL)	Poland	0–3	Loss
2007	Europe/Africa Group I, Round Robin	20 April	Plovdiv (BUL)	Luxembourg	1–2	Loss
2007	Europe/Africa Group I, Relegation Play-off	21 April	Plovdiv (BUL)	Lithuania	2–0	Win
2008	Europe/Africa Group I, Round Robin	30 January	Budapest (HUN)	Portugal	3–0	Win
2008	Europe/Africa Group I, Round Robin	31 January	Budapest (HUN)	Luxembourg	2–1	Win
2008	Europe/Africa Group I, Round Robin	1 February	Budapest (HUN)	Netherlands	0–2	Loss
2008	Europe/Africa Group I, Positional Play-off	2 February	Budapest (HUN)	Hungary	0–2	Loss
2009	Europe/Africa Group I, Round Robin	4 February	Tallinn (EST)	Estonia	0–3	Loss
2009	Europe/Africa Group I, Round Robin	6 February	Tallinn (EST)	Croatia	1–2	Loss
2009	Europe/Africa Group I, Relegation Play-off	7 February	Tallinn (EST)	Bosnia and Herzegovina	1–2	Loss

=== 2010s ===
Year	Competition	Date	Location	Opponent	Score	Result
2010	Europe/Africa Group I, Round Robin	3 February	Lisbon (POR)	Netherlands	1–2	Loss
2010	Europe/Africa Group I, Round Robin	4 February	Lisbon (POR)	Israel	1–2	Loss
2010	Europe/Africa Group I, Round Robin	5 February	Lisbon (POR)	Slovenia	2–1	Win
2010	Europe/Africa Group I, Relegation Play-off	6 February	Lisbon (POR)	Portugal	2–1	Win
2011	Europe/Africa Group I, Round Robin	2 February	Eilat (ISR)	Poland	2–1	Win
2011	Europe/Africa Group I, Round Robin	3 February	Eilat (ISR)	Luxembourg	1–2	Loss
2011	Europe/Africa Group I, Round Robin	4 February	Eilat (ISR)	Israel	1–2	Loss
2011	Europe/Africa Group I, Relegation Play-off	5 February	Eilat (ISR)	Latvia	2–0	Win
2012	Europe/Africa Group I, Round Robin	1 February	Eilat (ISR)	Estonia	3–0	Win
2012	Europe/Africa Group I, Round Robin	3 February	Eilat (ISR)	Austria	1–2	Loss
2012	Europe/Africa Group I, Positional Play-off	5 February	Eilat (ISR)	Portugal	0–2	Loss
2013	Europe/Africa Group I, Round Robin	7 February	Eilat (ISR)	Netherlands	3–0	Win
2013	Europe/Africa Group I, Round Robin	8 February	Eilat (ISR)	Luxembourg	3–0	Win
2013	Europe/Africa Group I, Round Robin	9 February	Eilat (ISR)	Slovenia	3–0	Win
2013	Europe/Africa Group I, Promotional Play-off	10 February	Eilat (ISR)	Great Britain	0–2	Loss
2014	Europe/Africa Group I, Round Robin	4 February	Budapest (HUN)	Portugal	1–2	Loss
2014	Europe/Africa Group I, Round Robin	6 February	Budapest (HUN)	Turkey	1–2	Loss
2014	Europe/Africa Group I, Round Robin	7 February	Budapest (HUN)	Belarus	1–2	Loss
2014	Europe/Africa Group I, Relegation Play-off	9 February	Budapest (HUN)	Luxembourg	2–0	Win
2015	Europe/Africa Group I, Round Robin	4 February	Budapest (HUN)	Portugal	3–0	Win
2015	Europe/Africa Group I, Round Robin	5 February	Budapest (HUN)	Belarus	0–3	Loss
2015	Europe/Africa Group I, Round Robin	6 February	Budapest (HUN)	Georgia	1–2	Loss
2015	Europe/Africa Group I, Positional Play-off	7 February	Budapest (HUN)	Ukraine	0–2	Loss
2016	Europe/Africa Group I, Round Robin	3 February	Eilat (ISR)	Hungary	2–1	Win
2016	Europe/Africa Group I, Round Robin	4 February	Eilat (ISR)	Latvia	2–1	Win
2016	Europe/Africa Group I, Round Robin	5 February	Eilat (ISR)	Belgium	0–3	Loss
2016	Europe/Africa Group I, Positional Play-off	6 February	Eilat (ISR)	Georgia	1–2	Loss
2017	Europe/Africa Group I, Round Robin	8 February	Tallinn (EST)	Israel	2–1	Win
2017	Europe/Africa Group I, Round Robin	9 February	Tallinn (EST)	Serbia	1–2	Loss
2017	Europe/Africa Group I, Round Robin	10 February	Tallinn (EST)	Estonia	1–2	Loss
2018	Europe/Africa Group I, Round Robin	7 February	Tallinn (EST)	Serbia	1–2	Loss
2018	Europe/Africa Group I, Round Robin	8 February	Tallinn (EST)	Georgia	2–1	Win
2018	Europe/Africa Group I, Positional Play-off	10 February	Tallinn (EST)	Poland	0–2	Loss
2019	Europe/Africa Group I, Round Robin	6 February	Zielona Góra (POL)	Estonia	2–1	Win
2019	Europe/Africa Group I, Round Robin	7 February	Zielona Góra (POL)	Ukraine	1–2	Loss
2019	Europe/Africa Group I, Round Robin	8 February	Zielona Góra (POL)	Sweden	0–3	Loss

=== 2020s ===
Year	Competition	Date	Location	Opponent	Score	Result
2020	Europe/Africa Group I, Round Robin	5 February	Tallinn (EST)	Croatia	1–2	Loss
2020	Europe/Africa Group I, Round Robin	6 February	Tallinn (EST)	Ukraine	0–3	Loss
2020	Europe/Africa Group I, Relegation Play-off	8 February	Tallinn (EST)	Greece	2–0	Win
2022	Europe/Africa Group I, Round Robin	11 April	Antalya (TUR)	Austria	1–2	Loss
2022	Europe/Africa Group I, Round Robin	12 April	Antalya (TUR)	Croatia	0–3	Loss
2022	Europe/Africa Group I, Round Robin	13 April	Antalya (TUR)	Sweden	3–0	Win
2022	Europe/Africa Group I, Round Robin	14 April	Antalya (TUR)	Slovenia	1–2	Loss
2022	Europe/Africa Group I, Round Robin	15 April	Antalya (TUR)	Georgia	2–1	Win
2023	Europe/Africa Group I, Round Robin	10 April	Antalya (TUR)	Serbia	1–2	Loss
2023	Europe/Africa Group I, Round Robin	11 April	Antalya (TUR)	Croatia	3–0	Win
2023	Europe/Africa Group I, Round Robin	12 April	Antalya (TUR)	Sweden	2–1	Win
2023	Europe/Africa Group I, Round Robin	13 April	Antalya (TUR)	Norway	1–2	Loss
2023	Europe/Africa Group I, Round Robin	14 April	Antalya (TUR)	Denmark	2–1	Win
2023	Europe/Africa Group I, Positional Play-off	15 April	Antalya (TUR)	Turkey	2–0	Win
2024	Europe/Africa Group I, Round Robin	8 April	Oeiras (POR)	Hungary	1–2	Loss
2024	Europe/Africa Group I, Round Robin	9 April	Oeiras (POR)	Denmark	1–2	Loss
2024	Europe/Africa Group I, Round Robin	10 April	Oeiras (POR)	Austria	2–1	Win
2024	Europe/Africa Group I, Relegation Play-off	12 April	Oeiras (POR)	Norway	2–1	Win
2024	Europe/Africa Group I, Relegation Play-off	13 April	Oeiras (POR)	Portugal	1–2	Loss
2025	Europe/Africa Group II, Round Robin	8 April	Larnaca (CYP)	Israel	3–0	Win
2025	Europe/Africa Group II, Round Robin	9 April	Larnaca (CYP)	Egypt	2–1	Win
2025	Europe/Africa Group II, Promotional Play-off	10 April	Larnaca (CYP)	Norway	1–2	Loss
2025	Europe/Africa Group II, Promotional Play-off	11 April	Larnaca (CYP)	Georgia	0–2	Loss
2026	Europe/Africa Group II, Round Robin	6 April	Banja Luka (BIH)	South Africa	3–0	Win
2026	Europe/Africa Group II, Round Robin	7 April	Banja Luka (BIH)	Morocco	2–1	Win
2026	Europe/Africa Group II, Round Robin	8 April	Banja Luka (BIH)	North Macedonia	3–0	Win
2026	Europe/Africa Group II, Round Robin	10 April	Banja Luka (BIH)	Egypt	3–0	Win
2026	Europe/Africa Group II, Promotional Play-off	11 April	Banja Luka (BIH)	Cyprus	2–0	Win

== Team representatives ==
This is a list of tennis players who have represented the Bulgaria Billie Jean King Cup team in an official Fed Cup/Billie Jean King Cup match.

Player	W-L (Total)	W-L (Singles)	W-L (Doubles)	Ties	Debut	Years played
Jaklin Alawi	0–2	0–0	0–2	2	2007	1
Galia Angelova	6–5	3–2	3–3	8	1988	2
Petia Arshinkova	1–4	0–1	1–3	5	2018	3
Lubomira Bacheva	1–6	0–4	1–2	4	1993	4
Yulia Berberian	0–4	0–0	0–4	4	1968	3
Borislava Botusharova	0–1	0–1	0–0	1	2014	1
Maria Chakarova	3–4	2–2	1–2	4	1966	3
Rositsa Dencheva	7–3	4–1	3–2	9	2022	3
Galina Dimitrova	0–2	0–2	0–0	2	1997	1
Dora Djilianova	0–1	0–0	0–1	1	1995	1
Lidia Encheva	2–1	1–0	1–1	3	2026	1
Dia Evtimova	15–20	7–13	8–7	29	2007	8
Filipa Gabrovska	2–4	0–0	2–4	6	1998	3
Maria Geznenge	5–2	0–0	5–2	7	1999	4
Denislava Glushkova	4–3	4–2	0–1	7	2023	3
Lia Karatancheva	13–8	8–3	5–5	14	2023	3
Sesil Karatantcheva	10–6	6–2	4–4	11	2004	3
Marina Kondova	1–1	0–0	1–1	2	1983	1
Yoana Konstantinova	0–2	0–0	0–2	2	2022	1
Elitsa Kostova	16–18	10–12	6–6	27	2008	10
Dimana Krastevitch	1–4	1–2	0–2	3	2006	1
Svetlana Krivencheva	2–4	0–2	2–2	6	1988	4
Katerina Maleeva	29–22	20–9	9–13	28	1984	10
Magdalena Maleeva	27–17	18–8	9–9	27	1991	10
Manuela Maleeva	22–12	16–4	6–8	20	1983	6
Dessislava Mladenova	1–2	0–0	1–2	3	2007	1
Diana Moskova	0–1	0–0	0–1	1	1975	1
Teodora Nedeva	0–3	0–0	0–3	3	1996	2
Pavlina Nola	5–7	4–4	1–3	7	1995	3
Elena Pampoulova	6–7	4–5	2–2	10	1988	3
Antoaneta Pandjerova	8–13	3–8	5–5	14	1996	5
Biljana Pawlowa-Dimitrova	1–1	0–1	1–0	1	2010	1
Maria Penkova	3–6	1–0	2–6	8	2004	3
Tsvetana Pironkova	29–26	22–17	7–9	39	2003	13
Lubka Radkova	1–9	0–5	1–4	5	1966	4
Dora Rangelova	4–7	1–2	3–5	8	1986	3
Isabella Shinikova	20–26	10–13	10–13	37	2012	12
Christina Sotirova	0–1	0–1	0–0	1	1975	1
Julia Terziyska	6–4	1–2	5–2	9	2018	3
Viktoriya Tomova	13–13	8–10	5–3	21	2014	8
Desislava Topalova	18–16	14–7	4–9	23	1997	8
Gergana Topalova	7–7	3–4	4–3	11	2019	4
Radoslava Topalova	1–2	0–0	1–2	3	2001	2
Adriana Velcheva	1–4	1–2	0–2	3	1983	1
Elizara Yaneva	7–0	4–0	3–0	5	2026	1

== See also ==
- Billie Jean King Cup
- Bulgaria Davis Cup team
- Bulgaria at the Hopman Cup
