= 2000 Fed Cup Europe/Africa Zone Group I – Pool A =

International tennis competition

Group A of the 2000 Fed Cup Europe/Africa Zone Group I was one of four pools in the Europe/Africa Zone Group I of the 2000 Fed Cup. Four teams competed in a round robin competition, with the top team advancing to the knockout stage.

	(Netherlands) NED	(Bulgaria) BUL	(Sweden) SWE	(Turkey) TUR	RR; W–L	Set; W–L	Game; W–L	Standings
Netherlands		3–0	3–0	3–0	3–0	18–0	111–55	1
Bulgaria	0–3		2–1	3–0	2–1	11–9	90–86	2
Sweden	0–3	1–2		2–1	1–2	8–14	90–113	3
Turkey	0–3	0–3	1–2		0–3	3–17	65–112	4

== Netherlands vs. Turkey ==
Netherlands
3
La Manga Club, Murcia, Spain
16 May 2000
Red clay (outdoors)

Turkey
0

			1	2	3
1	(Netherlands) (Turkey)	Seda Noorlander; Duygu Akşit Oal	6; 3	7; 5
2	(Netherlands) (Turkey)	Kristie Boogert; Gülberk Gültekin	6; 1	6; 0
3	(Netherlands) (Turkey)	Seda Noorlander / Miriam Oremans; Duygu Akşit Oal / Gülberk Gültekin	6; 4	6; 4

== Bulgaria vs. Sweden ==
Bulgaria
2
La Manga Club, Murcia, Spain
16 May 2000
Red clay (outdoors)

Sweden
1

			1	2	3
1	(Bulgaria) (Sweden)	Antoaneta Pandjerova; Sofia Arvidsson	1; 6	6; 3	5; 7
2	(Bulgaria) (Sweden)	Desislava Topalova; Diana Majkić	6; 2	6^{9} 7^{11}	6; 4
3	(Bulgaria) (Sweden)	Maria Geznenge / Antoaneta Pandjerova; Frida Engblom / Maria Strandlund	6; 4	6; 2

== Netherlands vs. Sweden ==
Netherlands
3
La Manga Club, Murcia, Spain
17 May 2000
Red clay (outdoors)

Sweden
0

			1	2	3
1	(Netherlands) (Sweden)	Miriam Oremans; Sofia Arvidsson	6; 3	6; 1
2	(Netherlands) (Sweden)	Seda Noorlander; Diana Majkić	6; 3	7; 5
3	(Netherlands) (Sweden)	Amanda Hopmans / Miriam Oremans; Sofia Arvidsson / Frida Engblom	6; 3	6; 1

== Bulgaria vs. Turkey ==
Bulgaria
3
La Manga Club, Murcia, Spain
17 May 2000
Red clay (outdoors)

Turkey
0

			1	2	3
1	(Bulgaria) (Turkey)	Antoaneta Pandjerova; Duygu Akşit Oal	6; 2	6; 2
2	(Bulgaria) (Turkey)	Desislava Topalova; Gülberk Gültekin	6; 2	6; 0
3	(Bulgaria) (Turkey)	Filipa Gabrovska / Maria Geznenge; Duygu Akşit Oal / Gülberk Gültekin	6; 4	6; 4

== Netherlands vs. Bulgaria ==
Netherlands
3
La Manga Club, Murcia, Spain
18 May 2000
Red clay (outdoors)

Bulgaria
0

			1	2	3
1	(Netherlands) (Bulgaria)	Miriam Oremans; Antoaneta Pandjerova	6; 3	6; 4
2	(Netherlands) (Bulgaria)	Amanda Hopmans; Desislava Topalova	7^{8} 6^{6}	6; 4
3	(Netherlands) (Bulgaria)	Kristie Boogert / Miriam Oremans; Filipa Gabrovska / Maria Geznenge	6; 3	6; 2

== Sweden vs. Turkey ==
Sweden
2
La Manga Club, Murcia, Spain
18 May 2000
Red clay (outdoors)

Turkey
1

			1	2	3
1	(Sweden) (Turkey)	Sofia Arvidsson; Duygu Akşit Oal	6; 3	3; 6	6; 2
2	(Sweden) (Turkey)	Diana Majkić; Gülberk Gültekin	7; 5	6; 3
3	(Sweden) (Turkey)	Sofia Arvidsson / Frida Engblom; Duygu Akşit Oal / Gülberk Gültekin	6; 3	2; 6	3; 6

- Turkey failed to win any ties in the pool, and thus was relegated to Group II in 2001, where they placed first in their pool of five, and thus advanced back to Group I for 2002.

== See also ==
- Fed Cup structure
