= 2001 Fed Cup Europe/Africa Zone Group I – Pool D =

Group D of the 2001 Fed Cup Europe/Africa Zone Group I was one of four pools in the Europe/Africa Zone Group I of the 2001 Fed Cup. Four teams competed in a round robin competition, with the top team advancing to the play-offs and the bottom team being relegated down to Group II for 2002.

	(Israel) ISR	(Greece) GRE	(Luxembourg) LUX	(Bulgaria) BUL	(Denmark) DEN	Match; W–L	Set; W–L	Game; W–L	Standings
Israel		2–0	2–1	2–1	3–0	4–0	18–8	142–108	1
Greece	0–2		2–1	2–1	3–0	3–1	14–11	120–122	2
Luxembourg	1–2	1–2		2–1	1–2	1–3	13–14	131–138	3
Bulgaria	1–2	1–2	1–2		2–1	1–3	11–14	114–112	4
Denmark	0–3	0–3	2–1	1–2		1–3	9–18	111–138	5

== Israel vs. Denmark ==
Israel
3
Murcia, Spain
23 May 2001
Red clay (outdoors)

Denmark
0

			1	2	3
1	(Israel) (Denmark)	Tzipora Obziler; Charlotte Aagaard	6; 2	3; 6	6; 2
2	(Israel) (Denmark)	Anna Smashnova; Eva Dyrberg	6; 4	4; 6	7; 5
3	(Israel) (Denmark)	Tzipora Obziler / Hila Rosen; Karina-Ildor Jacobsgaard / Maria Rasmussen	6; 3	6; 2

== Greece vs. Bulgaria ==
Greece
2
Murcia, Spain
23 May 2001
Red clay (outdoors)

Bulgaria
1

			1	2	3
1	(Greece) (Bulgaria)	Evagelia Roussi; Desislava Topalova	7^{7} 6^{3}	6; 2
2	(Greece) (Bulgaria)	Eleni Daniilidou; Antoaneta Pandjerova	3; 6	6; 4	7; 5
3	(Greece) (Bulgaria)	Eleni Daniilidou / Asimina Kaplani; Antoaneta Pandjerova / Desislava Topalova	6; 4	6; 4

== Israel vs. Bulgaria ==
Israel
2
Murcia, Spain
24 May 2001
Red clay (outdoors)

Bulgaria
1

			1	2	3
1	(Israel) (Bulgaria)	Tzipora Obziler; Desislava Topalova	6; 3	6; 3
2	(Israel) (Bulgaria)	Anna Smashnova; Antoaneta Pandjerova	6; 2	6; 4
3	(Israel) (Bulgaria)	Cheli Bargil / Hila Rosen; Maria Geznenge / Radoslava Topalova	2; 6	5; 7

== Luxembourg vs. Denmark ==
Luxembourg
1
Murcia, Spain
24 May 2001
Red clay (outdoors)

Denmark
2

			1	2	3
1	(Luxembourg) (Denmark)	Claudine Schaul; Karina-Ildor Jacobsgaard	5; 7	6; 3	6; 4
2	(Luxembourg) (Denmark)	Anne Kremer; Eva Dyrberg	6; 3	3; 2		retired
3	(Luxembourg) (Denmark)	Mandy Minella / Claudine Schaul; Eva Dyrberg / Karina-Ildor Jacobsgaard	0; 6	3; 6

== Greece vs. Luxembourg ==
Greece
2
Murcia, Spain
25 May 2001
Red clay (outdoors)

Luxembourg
1

			1	2	3
1	(Greece) (Luxembourg)	Evagelia Roussi; Mandy Minella	4; 6	2; 6
2	(Greece) (Luxembourg)	Eleni Daniilidou; Claudine Schaul	6; 4	6; 3
3	(Greece) (Luxembourg)	Eleni Daniilidou / Asimina Kaplani; Mandy Minella / Claudine Schaul	7; 5	4; 6	6; 3

== Bulgaria vs. Denmark ==
Bulgaria
2
Murcia, Spain
25 May 2001
Red clay (outdoors)

Denmark
1

			1	2	3
1	(Bulgaria) (Denmark)	Desislava Topalova; Karina-Ildor Jacobsgaard	6; 0	6; 0
2	(Bulgaria) (Denmark)	Antoaneta Pandjerova; Eva Dyrberg	4; 6	0; 6
3	(Bulgaria) (Denmark)	Antoaneta Pandjerova / Desislava Topalova; Eva Dyrberg / Maria Rasmussen	6; 1	6; 4

== Israel vs. Luxembourg ==
Israel
2
Murcia, Spain
26 May 2001
Red clay (outdoors)

Luxembourg
1

			1	2	3
1	(Israel) (Luxembourg)	Tzipora Obziler; Claudine Schaul	6; 4	5; 7	6; 2
2	(Israel) (Luxembourg)	Anna Smashnova; Anne Kremer	4; 6	2; 6
3	(Israel) (Luxembourg)	Tzipora Obziler / Hila Rosen; Anne Kremer / Claudine Schaul	3; 6	7^{7} 6^{5}	10; 8

== Greece vs. Denmark ==
Greece
3
Murcia, Spain
26 May 2001
Red clay (outdoors)

Denmark
0

			1	2	3
1	(Greece) (Denmark)	Evagelia Roussi; Karina-Ildor Jacobsgaard	6; 2	7; 5
2	(Greece) (Denmark)	Eleni Daniilidou; Eva Dyrberg	6; 1	7^{7} 6^{5}
3	(Greece) (Denmark)	Asimina Kaplani / Maria Pavlidou; Karina-Ildor Jacobsgaard / Maria Rasmussen	2; 6	7; 5	6; 4

== Israel vs. Greece ==
Israel
2
Murcia, Spain
27 May 2001
Red clay (outdoors)

Greece
0

			1	2	3
1	(Israel) (Greece)	Tzipora Obziler; Evagelia Roussi	6; 0	6; 4
2	(Israel) (Greece)	Anna Smashnova; Eleni Daniilidou	6; 2	6; 2
3	(Israel) (Greece)					not played

== Luxembourg vs. Bulgaria ==
Luxembourg
2
Murcia, Spain
27 May 2001
Red clay (outdoors)

Bulgaria
1

			1	2	3
1	(Luxembourg) (Bulgaria)	Claudine Schaul; Desislava Topalova	6; 4	7^{7} 6^{5}
2	(Luxembourg) (Bulgaria)	Anne Kremer; Antoaneta Pandjerova	6; 2	6; 1
3	(Luxembourg) (Bulgaria)	Anne Kremer / Mandy Minella; Maria Geznenge / Antoaneta Pandjerova	2; 6	1; 6

- Denmark placed last in the pool, and thus was relegated to Group II in 2001, where they achieved promotion back to Group I for 2002.

== See also ==
- Fed Cup structure
