= 2002 Fed Cup Europe/Africa Zone Group I – Pool C =

International tennis competition

Group C of the 2002 Fed Cup Europe/Africa Zone Group I was one of four pools in the Europe/Africa Zone Group I of the 2002 Fed Cup. Four teams competed in a round robin competition, with the top two teams advancing to the play-offs and the bottom team being relegated down to Group II for 2003.

	(Bulgaria) BUL	(Estonia) EST	(Georgia (country)) GEO	(Portugal) POR	RR; W–L	Set; W–L	Game; W–L	Standings
Bulgaria		2–1	2–1	3–0	3–0	15–4	109–65	1
Estonia	1–2		2–1	3–0	2–1	13–7	110–98	2
Georgia	1–2	1–2		3–0	1–2	10–13	103–122	3
Portugal	0–3	0–3	0–3		0–3	3–17	86–123	4

== Bulgaria vs. Portugal ==
Bulgaria
2
Antalya, Turkey
24 April 2002
Red clay (outdoors)

Portugal
1

			1	2	3
1	(Bulgaria) (Portugal)	Desislava Topalova; Neuza Silva	7^{7} 6^{4}	6; 1
2	(Bulgaria) (Portugal)	Magdalena Maleeva; Angela Cardoso	6; 0	6; 0
3	(Bulgaria) (Portugal)	Magdalena Maleeva / Desislava Topalova; Angela Cardoso / Ana Catarina Nogueira	6; 2	7; 5

== Estonia vs. Georgia ==
Estonia
2
Antalya, Turkey
24 April 2002
Red clay (outdoors)

Georgia
1

			1	2	3
1	(Estonia) (Georgia (country))	Maret Ani; Salome Devidze	6; 2	4; 6	4; 6
2	(Estonia) (Georgia (country))	Kaia Kanepi; Margalita Chakhnashvili	1; 6	6; 4	6; 4
3	(Estonia) (Georgia (country))	Maret Ani / Kaia Kanepi; Margalita Chakhnashvili / Salome Devidze	6; 3	7^{7} 6^{4}

== Bulgaria vs. Georgia ==
Bulgaria
2
Antalya, Turkey
25 April 2002
Red clay (outdoors)

Georgia
1

			1	2	3
1	(Bulgaria) (Georgia (country))	Desislava Topalova; Nana Urotadze	6; 1	6; 2
2	(Bulgaria) (Georgia (country))	Magdalena Maleeva; Salome Devidze	6; 1	6; 3
3	(Bulgaria) (Georgia (country))	Filipa Gabrovska / Radoslava Topalova; Margalita Chakhnashvili / Salome Devidze	6^{5} 7^{7}	7; 5	4; 6

== Estonia vs. Portugal ==
Estonia
3
Antalya, Turkey
25 April 2002
Red clay (outdoors)

Portugal
0

			1	2	3
1	(Estonia) (Portugal)	Maret Ani; Ana Catarina Nogueira	6; 2	3; 6	6; 2
2	(Estonia) (Portugal)	Kaia Kanepi; Frederica Piedade	5; 7	6; 4	6; 2
3	(Estonia) (Portugal)	Ilona Poljakova / Margit Rüütel; Angela Cardoso / Ana Catarina Nogueira	6; 4	6; 4

== Bulgaria vs. Estonia ==
Bulgaria
2
Antalya, Turkey
26 April 2002
Red clay (outdoors)

Estonia
1

			1	2	3
1	(Bulgaria) (Estonia)	Desislava Topalova; Maret Ani	7; 5	6; 3
2	(Bulgaria) (Estonia)	Magdalena Maleeva; Kaia Kanepi	6; 4	6; 2
3	(Bulgaria) (Estonia)	Filipa Gabrovska / Radoslava Topalova; Maret Ani / Kaia Kanepi	7; 5	6; 1

== Georgia vs. Portugal ==
Georgia
2
Antalya, Turkey
26 April 2002
Red clay (outdoors)

Portugal
1

			1	2	3
1	(Georgia (country)) (Portugal)	Salome Devidze; Ana Catarina Nogueira	6; 4	6^{7} 7^{9}	8; 6
2	(Georgia (country)) (Portugal)	Margalita Chakhnashvili; Frederica Piedade	1; 6	7; 5	1; 6
3	(Georgia (country)) (Portugal)	Margalita Chakhnashvili / Salome Devidze; Angela Cardoso / Neuza Silva	6; 4	6; 3

- Portugal failed to win any ties in the pool, and thus was relegated to Group II in 2003, where they placed equal third.

== See also ==
- Fed Cup structure
