= 1997 Fed Cup Europe/Africa Zone Group I – Pool A =

International tennis competition

Group A of the 1997 Fed Cup Europe/Africa Zone Group I was one of four pools in the Europe/Africa Zone Group I of the 1997 Fed Cup. Three teams competed in a round robin competition, with the top two teams advancing to the knockout stage.

	(Russia) RUS	(Greece) GRE	(Bulgaria) BUL	RR; W–L	Set; W–L	Game; W–L	Standings
Russia		3–0	2–1	2–0	11–3	82–47	1
Greece	0–3		2–1	1–1	4–9	53–66	2
Bulgaria	1–2	1–2		0–2	6–9	59–81	3

== Russia vs. Greece ==
Russia
3
Bari T.C., Bari, Italy
22 April 1997
Red clay (outdoors)

Greece
0

			1	2	3
1	(Russia) (Greece)	Anna Kournikova; Christina Zachariadou	6; 3	6; 4
2	(Russia) (Greece)	Elena Likhovtseva; Christína Papadáki	6; 3	6; 1
3	(Russia) (Greece)	Anna Kournikova / Elena Likhovtseva; Christína Papadáki / Christina Zachariadou	7; 5	6; 1

== Russia vs. Bulgaria ==
Russia
2
Bari T.C., Bari, Italy
23 April 1997
Red clay (outdoors)

Bulgaria
1

			1	2	3
1	(Russia) (Bulgaria)	Elena Makarova; Desislava Topalova	6; 4	6^{5} 7^{7}	3; 6
2	(Russia) (Bulgaria)	Elena Likhovtseva; Galina Dimitrova	6; 1	6; 3
3	(Russia) (Bulgaria)	Anna Kournikova / Elena Likhovtseva; Teodora Nedeva / Desislava Topalova	6; 2	6^{7} 7^{9}	6; 0

== Greece vs. Bulgaria ==
Greece
2
Bari T.C., Bari, Italy
24 April 1997
Red clay (outdoors)

Bulgaria
1

			1	2	3
1	(Greece) (Bulgaria)	Christina Zachariadou; Desislava Topalova	6^{4} 7^{7}	4; 6
2	(Greece) (Bulgaria)	Christína Papadáki; Galina Dimitrova	2; 6	6; 3	6; 4
3	(Greece) (Bulgaria)	Christína Papadáki / Christina Zachariadou; Teodora Nedeva / Desislava Topalova	6; 2	6; 1

== See also ==
- Fed Cup structure
