= 2006 Fed Cup Europe/Africa Zone Group I – Pool C =

Group C of the 2006 Fed Cup Europe/Africa Zone Group I was one of four pools in the Europe/Africa Zone Group I of the 2006 Fed Cup. Four teams competed in a round robin competition, with the top team and the bottom team proceeding to their respective sections of the play-offs: the top team played for advancement to the World Group II Play-offs, while the bottom team faced potential relegation to Group II.

		(Bulgaria) BUL	(Ukraine) UKR	(Hungary) HUN	(United Kingdom) GBR	RR; W–L	Set; W–L	Game; W–L	Standings
19	Bulgaria		2–1	1–2	1–2	1–2	10–10	83–84	2
24	Ukraine	1–2		2–1	0–3	1–2	7–13	73–102	4
38	Hungary	2–1	1–2		1–2	1–2	10–11	91–98	3
42	Great Britain	2–1	3–0	2–1		3–0	15–6	105–68	1

== Bulgaria vs. Hungary ==
Bulgaria
1
TC Lokomotiv, Plovdiv, Bulgaria
18 April 2006
Red clay (outdoors)

Hungary
2

			1	2	3
1	(Bulgaria) (Hungary)	Dimana Krastevitch; Kira Nagy	6; 3	6^{2} 7^{7}	3; 6
2	(Bulgaria) (Hungary)	Tsvetana Pironkova; Melinda Czink	6; 3	6; 4
3	(Bulgaria) (Hungary)	Maria Penkova / Tsvetana Pironkova; Kira Nagy / Virág Németh	3; 6	1; 6

== Ukraine vs. Great Britain ==
Ukraine
1
TC Lokomotiv, Plovdiv, Bulgaria
18 April 2006
Red clay (outdoors)

Great Britain
2

			1	2	3
1	(Ukraine) (United Kingdom)	Valeria Bondarenko; Elena Baltacha	3; 6	0; 6
2	(Ukraine) (United Kingdom)	Olena Antypina; Anne Keothavong	6; 7	6; 2	6; 0
3	(Ukraine) (United Kingdom)	Olena Antypina / Valeria Bondarenko; Elena Baltacha / Claire Curran	4; 6	4; 6

== Bulgaria vs. Great Britain ==
Bulgaria
1
TC Lokomotiv, Plovdiv, Bulgaria
19 April 2006
Red clay (outdoors)

Great Britain
2

			1	2	3
1	(Bulgaria) (United Kingdom)	Dimana Krastevitch; Elena Baltacha	3; 6	1; 6
2	(Bulgaria) (United Kingdom)	Tsvetana Pironkova; Anne Keothavong	6; 1	6; 1
3	(Bulgaria) (United Kingdom)	Dimana Krastevitch / Tsvetana Pironkova; Elena Baltacha / Claire Curran	1; 6	6; 1	2; 6

== Ukraine vs. Hungary ==
Ukraine
2
TC Lokomotiv, Plovdiv, Bulgaria
19 April 2006
Red clay (outdoors)

Hungary
1

			1	2	3
1	(Ukraine) (Hungary)	Valeria Bondarenko; Kira Nagy	2; 6	2; 6
2	(Ukraine) (Hungary)	Olena Antypina; Melinda Czink	6; 4	3; 6	6; 3
3	(Ukraine) (Hungary)	Olena Antypina / Valeria Bondarenko; Kira Nagy / Virág Németh	6; 4	6; 4

== Bulgaria vs. Ukraine ==
Bulgaria
2
TC Lokomotiv, Plovdiv, Bulgaria
20 April 2006
Red clay (outdoors)

Ukraine
1

			1	2	3
1	(Bulgaria) (Ukraine)	Dimana Krastevitch; Valeria Bondarenko	6; 3	6; 3
2	(Bulgaria) (Ukraine)	Tsvetana Pironkova; Olena Antypina	6; 0	6; 4
3	(Bulgaria) (Ukraine)	Dimana Krastevitch / Maria Penkova; Olena Antypina / Valeria Bondarenko	2; 6	1; 6

== Hungary vs. Great Britain ==
Hungary
1
TC Lokomotiv, Plovdiv, Bulgaria
20 April 2006
Red clay (outdoors)

Great Britain
2

			1	2	3
1	(Hungary) (United Kingdom)	Kira Nagy; Elena Baltacha	1; 6	2; 6
2	(Hungary) (United Kingdom)	Melinda Czink; Anne Keothavong	1; 6	6; 3	6; 2
3	(Hungary) (United Kingdom)	Kira Nagy / Virág Németh; Elena Baltacha / Claire Curran	1; 6	6^{5} 7^{7}

== See also ==
- Fed Cup structure
