= 1996 Fed Cup World Group II play-offs =

International tennis competition play-offs

The 1996 World Group II play-offs were four ties which involved the losing nations of the World Group II and four nations from the three Zonal Group I competitions. Nations that won their play-off ties entered the 1997 World Group II, while losing nations joined their respective zonal groups.

== Canada vs. Australia ==
Canada
2
Timberlane Country Arena, Aurora, Ontario, Canada
13–14 July 1996
Har-Tru clay (outdoors)

Australia
3

			1	2	3
1	(Canada) (Australia)	Rene Simpson; Nicole Bradtke	3; 6	6; 3	6; 3
2	(Canada) (Australia)	Patricia Hy; Rachel McQuillan	6; 2	7; 5
3	(Canada) (Australia)	Patricia Hy; Nicole Bradtke	3; 6	6; 3	2; 6
4	(Canada) (Australia)	Rene Simpson; Rachel McQuillan	3; 6	4; 6
5	(Canada) (Australia)	Jill Hetherington / Rene Simpson; Nicole Bradtke / Rachel McQuillan	6; 4	3; 6	0; 6

== Indonesia vs. Switzerland ==
Indonesia
2
Gelora Senayan Stadium, Jakarta, Indonesia
13–14 July 1996
Rebound Ace (outdoors)

Switzerland
3

			1	2	3
1	(Indonesia) (Switzerland)	Yayuk Basuki; Patty Schnyder	6; 3	6; 3
2	(Indonesia) (Switzerland)	Liza Andriyani; Martina Hingis	0; 6	0; 6
3	(Indonesia) (Switzerland)	Yayuk Basuki; Martina Hingis	5; 7	6; 3	6; 1
4	(Indonesia) (Switzerland)	Liza Andriyani; Patty Schnyder	2; 6	6; 2	1; 6
5	(Indonesia) (Switzerland)	Yayuk Basuki / Romana Tedjakusuma; Martina Hingis / Patty Schnyder	3; 6	2; 6

== Chile vs. Croatia ==
Chile
0
Union Tennis Club, Viña del Mar, Chile
13–14 July 1996
Red clay (outdoors)

Croatia
5

			1	2	3
1	(Chile) (Croatia)	Bárbara Castro; Mirjana Lučić	1; 6	6; 3	3; 6
2	(Chile) (Croatia)	Paula Cabezas; Silvija Talaja	2; 6	6; 0	5; 7
3	(Chile) (Croatia)	Bárbara Castro; Silvija Talaja	3; 6	6; 3	2; 6
4	(Chile) (Croatia)	Paula Cabezas; Mirjana Lučić	3; 6	2; 6
5	(Chile) (Croatia)	Paula Cabezas / María-Alejandra Quezada; Mirjana Lučić / Maja Murić	5; 7	2; 6

== Bulgaria vs. South Korea ==
Bulgaria
1
Lokomotiv Stadium, Plovdiv, Bulgaria
13–14 July 1996
Red clay (outdoors)

South Korea
4

			1	2	3
1	(Bulgaria) (South Korea)	Pavlina Stoyanova; Kim Eun-ha	3; 6	6; 0	6; 1
2	(Bulgaria) (South Korea)	Antoaneta Pandjerova; Park Sung-hee	4; 6	0; 6
3	(Bulgaria) (South Korea)	Pavlina Stoyanova; Park Sung-hee	3; 6	5; 7
4	(Bulgaria) (South Korea)	Antoaneta Pandjerova; Kim Eun-ha	7^{7} 6^{5}	1; 6	3; 6
5	(Bulgaria) (South Korea)	Teodora Nedeva / Pavlina Stoyanova; Choi Ju-yeon / Choi Young-ja	4; 6	6; 4	6^{3} 7^{7}

== See also ==
- Fed Cup structure
