= 2005 Fed Cup Europe/Africa Zone Group I – Pool A =

Group A of the 2005 Fed Cup Europe/Africa Zone Group I was one of four pools in the Europe/Africa Zone Group I of the 2005 Fed Cup. Four teams competed in a round robin competition, with the top team and the bottom team proceeding to their respective sections of the play-offs: the top team played for advancement to the World Group II Play-offs, while the bottom team faced potential relegation to Group II.

| | | (Bulgaria) BUL | (Estonia) EST | (Hungary) HUN | (South Africa) RSA | RR; W–L | Set; W–L | Game; W–L | Standings |
| 24 | Bulgaria | | 3–0 | 2–1 | 3–0 | 3–0 | 17–2 | 107–58 | 1 |
| 25 | Estonia | 0–3 | | 0–3 | 0–3 | 0–3 | 2–18 | 50–115 | 4 |
| 29 | Hungary | 1–2 | 3–0 | | 1–2 | 1–2 | 12–9 | 105–85 | 3 |
| 38 | South Africa | 0–3 | 3–0 | 2–1 | | 2–1 | 10–12 | 92–96 | 2 |

== Bulgaria vs. South Africa ==
Bulgaria
3
Club Ali Bey, Manavgat, Antalya, Turkey
20 April 2005
Red clay (outdoors)

South Africa
0

| | | | 1 | 2 | 3 |
|---|---|---|---|---|---|
| 1 | (Bulgaria) (South Africa) | Sesil Karatantcheva; Chanelle Scheepers | 6; 1 | 6; 2 |
| 2 | (Bulgaria) (South Africa) | Magdalena Maleeva; Natalie Grandin | 6; 4 | 6; 3 |
| 3 | (Bulgaria) (South Africa) | Sesil Karatantcheva / Magdalena Maleeva; Lizaan du Plessis / Alicia Pillay | 6; 3 | 6; 2 |

== Estonia vs. Hungary ==
Estonia
0
Club Ali Bey, Manavgat, Antalya, Turkey
20 April 2005
Red clay (outdoors)

Hungary
3

| | | | 1 | 2 | 3 |
|---|---|---|---|---|---|
| 1 | (Estonia) (Hungary) | Margit Rüütel; Virág Németh | 1; 6 | 4; 6 |
| 2 | (Estonia) (Hungary) | Maret Ani; Zsófia Gubacsi | 1; 6 | 5; 7 |
| 3 | (Estonia) (Hungary) | Anett Kaasik / Margit Rüütel; Barbara Pócza / Ágnes Szávay | 0; 6 | 4; 6 |

== Bulgaria vs. Hungary ==
Bulgaria
2
Club Ali Bey, Manavgat, Antalya, Turkey
21 April 2005
Red clay (outdoors)

Hungary
1

| | | | 1 | 2 | 3 |
|---|---|---|---|---|---|
| 1 | (Bulgaria) (Hungary) | Sesil Karatantcheva; Ágnes Szávay | 6; 4 | 6; 3 |
| 2 | (Bulgaria) (Hungary) | Magdalena Maleeva; Zsófia Gubacsi | 7^{7} 6^{4} | 6; 2 |
| 3 | (Bulgaria) (Hungary) | Sesil Karatantcheva / Magdalena Maleeva; Virág Németh / Ágnes Szávay | 6; 4 | 3; 6 | 1; 6 |

== Estonia vs. South Africa ==
Estonia
0
Club Ali Bey, Manavgat, Antalya, Turkey
21 April 2005
Red clay (outdoors)

South Africa
3

| | | | 1 | 2 | 3 |
|---|---|---|---|---|---|
| 1 | (Estonia) (South Africa) | Margit Rüütel; Chanelle Scheepers | 0; 6 | 6; 4 | 2; 6 |
| 2 | (Estonia) (South Africa) | Maret Ani; Natalie Grandin | 2; 6 | 6; 2 | 2; 6 |
| 3 | (Estonia) (South Africa) | Anett Kaasik / Ilona Poljakova; Natalie Grandin / Chanelle Scheepers | 3; 6 | 2; 6 |

== Bulgaria vs. Estonia ==
Bulgaria
3
Club Ali Bey, Manavgat, Antalya, Turkey
22 April 2005
Red clay (outdoors)

Estonia
0

| | | | 1 | 2 | 3 |
|---|---|---|---|---|---|
| 1 | (Bulgaria) (Estonia) | Maria Penkova; Anett Kaasik | 6; 2 | 6; 4 |
| 2 | (Bulgaria) (Estonia) | Tsvetana Pironkova; Margit Rüütel | 6; 1 | 6; 0 |
| 3 | (Bulgaria) (Estonia) | Maria Penkova / Tsvetana Pironkova; Anett Kaasik / Ilona Poljakova | 6; 3 | 6; 2 |

== Hungary vs. South Africa ==
Hungary
1
Club Ali Bey, Manavgat, Antalya, Turkey
22 April 2005
Red clay (outdoors)

South Africa
2

| | | | 1 | 2 | 3 |
|---|---|---|---|---|---|
| 1 | (Hungary) (South Africa) | Ágnes Szávay; Chanelle Scheepers | 6; 4 | 6; 1 |
| 2 | (Hungary) (South Africa) | Virág Németh; Natalie Grandin | 6; 4 | 3; 6 | 3; 6 |
| 3 | (Hungary) (South Africa) | Virág Németh / Ágnes Szávay; Natalie Grandin / Alicia Pillay | 2; 6 | 6; 1 | 5; 7 |

== See also ==
- Fed Cup structure
