= 1996 Fed Cup World Group II =

International women's tennis competition

The World Group II was the second highest level of Fed Cup competition in 1996. Winning nations advanced to the World Group play-offs, and the losing nations were demoted to the World Group II play-offs.

== Bulgaria vs. Slovakia ==
Bulgaria
0
Lokomotiv Stadium, Plovdiv, Bulgaria
27–28 April 1996
Red clay (outdoors)

Slovakia
5

			1	2	3
1	(Bulgaria) (Slovakia)	Lubomira Bacheva; Karina Habšudová	0; 6	1; 6
2	(Bulgaria) (Slovakia)	Svetlana Krivencheva; Katarína Studeníková	5; 7	4; 6
3	(Bulgaria) (Slovakia)	Svetlana Krivencheva; Karina Habšudová	3; 6	2; 6
4	(Bulgaria) (Slovakia)	Lubomira Bacheva; Katarína Studeníková	3; 6	4; 6
5	(Bulgaria) (Slovakia)	Antoaneta Pandjerova / Pavlina Stoyanova; Henrieta Nagyová / Radka Zrubáková	7; 5	3; 6	1; 6

== Netherlands vs. Australia ==
Netherlands
4
Kampen Lawn Tennis Club, Kampen, Netherlands
27–28 April 1996
Red clay (outdoors)

Australia
1

			1	2	3
1	(Netherlands) (Australia)	Miriam Oremans; Rennae Stubbs	6; 4	6; 3
2	(Netherlands) (Australia)	Brenda Schultz-McCarthy; Rachel McQuillan	7; 5	6; 3
3	(Netherlands) (Australia)	Brenda Schultz-McCarthy; Rennae Stubbs	6; 4	6; 2
4	(Netherlands) (Australia)	Kristie Boogert; Rachel McQuillan	6; 1	6; 3
5	(Netherlands) (Australia)	Manon Bollegraf / Brenda Schultz-McCarthy; Rachel McQuillan / Rennae Stubbs	3; 6	6; 3	6^{4} 7^{7}

== Indonesia vs. Belgium ==
Indonesia
2
Gelora Senayan Stadium, Jakarta, Indonesia
27–28 April 1996
Rebound Ace (outdoors)

Belgium
3

			1	2	3
1	(Indonesia) (Belgium)	Yayuk Basuki; Dominique Van Roost	6; 4	5; 7	7; 5
2	(Indonesia) (Belgium)	Romana Tedjakusuma; Sabine Appelmans	1; 6	0; 6
3	(Indonesia) (Belgium)	Yayuk Basuki; Sabine Appelmans	6; 4	7; 6
4	(Indonesia) (Belgium)	Romana Tedjakusuma; Dominique Van Roost	2; 6	0; 6
5	(Indonesia) (Belgium)	Liza Andriyani / Wynne Prakusya; Laurence Courtois / Nancy Feber	1; 6	2; 6

== Canada vs. Czech Republic ==
Canada
0
Shaughnessy Golf & Country Club, Vancouver, British Columbia, Canada
27–28 April 1996
Decoturf (outdoors)

Czech Republic
3

			1	2	3
1	(Canada) (Czech Republic)	Jana Nejedly; Jana Novotná	1; 6	1; 6
2	(Canada) (Czech Republic)	Patricia Hy; Helena Suková	6; 3	0; 6	6; 8
3	(Canada) (Czech Republic)	Patricia Hy; Jana Novotná	7^{7} 6^{4}	0; 6	1; 6
4	(Canada) (Czech Republic)	Jana Nejedly; Helena Suková	1; 6	5; 4		not completed
5	(Canada) (Czech Republic)	Jill Hetherington / Rene Simpson; Jana Novotná / Helena Suková				not played

== See also ==
- Fed Cup structure
