= Claudia Timm =

German tennis player

- Full name: Claudia Hoffmann-Timm
- Country (sports): West Germany; Germany
- Born: 5 April 1973 (age 51)
- Prize money: $23,940

Singles
- Career record: 82–70
- Career titles: 1 ITF
- Highest ranking: No. 330 (23 October 1995)

Doubles
- Career record: 38–37
- Career titles: 3 ITF
- Highest ranking: No. 301 (7 June 1993)
Medal record
Summer Universiade
Bronze medal – third place	1995 Fukuoka	Women's doubles
Bronze medal – third place	1997 Sicily	Mixed doubles

Claudia Hoffmann-Timm (born 5 April 1973) is a German former professional tennis player.

She reached her career-high ranking of 330 in the world in 1995, with her only ITF singles title coming that year, in a $10,000 tournament in Ratzeburg. As a doubles player, Timm won a further three ITF tournaments and twice competed in the doubles main draw of the WTA Tour event in Hamburg.

== ITF Circuit finals ==
=== Singles: 4 (1 title, 3 runner-ups) ===
Result	No.	Date	Tournament	Surface	Opponent	Score
Loss	1.	28 September 1992	ITF Athens, Greece	Clay	(Hungary) Rita Kuti-Kis	3–6, 3–6
Loss	2.	1 August 1994	ITF Dublin, Ireland	Clay	(France) Caroline Toyre	4–6, 3–6
Win	1.	22 May 1995	ITF Ratzeburg, Germany	Clay	(Germany) Sandra Klösel	7–6^{(9–7)}, 7–6^{(9–7)}
Loss	3.	26 June 1995	ITF Båstad, Sweden	Clay	(Sweden) Annica Lindstedt	1–6, 4–6

=== Doubles: 6 (3 titles, 3 runner-ups) ===
Result	No.	Date	Tournament	Surface	Partner	Opponents	Score
Loss	1.	14 September 1992	ITF Haifa, Israel	Hard	(Germany) Henrike Kadzidroga	(Israel) Yael Segal (Belgium) Vanessa Matthys	7–5, 0–6, 2–6
Win	1.	25 January 1993	ITF Båstad, Sweden	Carpet	(Germany) Michaela Seibold	(Luxembourg) Christine Goy (Belgium) Vanessa Matthys	6–2, 5–7, 6–2
Win	2.	10 May 1993	ITF Barcelona, Spain	Clay	(Spain) Conchita Martínez Granados	(Spain) Ana Salas Lozano (Argentina) María Fernanda Landa	7–5, 1–6, 6–2
Loss	2.	25 September 1994	ITF Varna, Bulgaria	Hard	(Bulgaria) Galina Dimitrova	(Bulgaria) Dora Djilianova (Bulgaria) Desislava Topalova	3–6, 5–7
Win	3.	22 May 1995	ITF Ratzeburg, Germany	Clay	(Israel) Nelly Barkan	(Netherlands) Amanda Hopmans (Russia) Anna Linkova	6–2, 6–1
Loss	3.	26 June 1995	ITF Båstad, Sweden	Clay	(Denmark) Sandra Olsen	(Czech Republic) Karolina Bakalarová (Czech Republic) Jana Lubasová	3–6, 2–6
