= Hiroko Hara =

Japanese tennis player (born 1972)

- Country (sports): Japan
- Born: 10 February 1972 (age 53)
- Plays: Right-handed
- Prize money: $24,091

Singles
- Career titles: 1 ITF
- Highest ranking: No. 319 (28 Nov 1994)

Doubles
- Highest ranking: No. 536 (24 May 1993)

Hiroko Hara (born 10 February 1972), now Hiroko Friend-Lomans, is a Japanese former professional tennis player.

A highly ranked junior player, Hara was a national team representative at the World Youth Cup.

While competing on the professional tour she reached a best singles ranking of 319 and qualified for the 1994 Nokia Open in Beijing, where she lost her first round match to Park Sung-hee in three sets.

Hara, who now lives in the Netherlands, is the mother of tennis player Jay Dylan Friend.

== ITF finals ==
=== Singles: 2 (1–1) ===
Result	No.	Date	Tournament	Surface	Opponent	Score
Win	1.	Jun 1992	ITF Aveiro, Portugal	Hard	(Slovakia) Janette Husárová	2–6, 6–3, 6–1
Loss	2.	Oct 1992	ITF Ibaraki, Japan	Hard	(Japan) Fumiko Yamazaki	5–7, 0–1 ret

=== Doubles: 1 (0–1) ===
Result	No.	Date	Tournament	Surface	Partner	Opponents	Score
Loss	1.	Jun 1992	ITF Covilhã, Portugal	Clay	(Lithuania) Galina Misiuriova	(Bulgaria) Galia Angelova (Bulgaria) Tzvetelina Nikolova	5–7, 5–7
