= Teodora Nedeva =

Bulgarian tennis player

Teodora Nedeva Теодора Недева
- Country (sports): Bulgaria
- Born: 22 April 1977 (age 49) Plovdiv, Bulgaria
- Turned pro: 1993
- Retired: 1999
- Plays: Right-handed (two-handed backhand)
- Prize money: $23,006

Singles
- Career record: 60–56
- Career titles: 0
- Highest ranking: No. 409 (6 March 1995)

Doubles
- Career record: 117–38
- Career titles: 19 ITF
- Highest ranking: No. 168 (10 July 1995)

Team competitions
- Fed Cup: 0–3

Teodora Nedeva (Bulgarian: Теодора Недева, born 22 April 1977) is a retired tennis player from Bulgaria.

On 6 March 1995, she reached her highest WTA singles ranking of 409 whilst her best doubles ranking was 168 on 10 July 1995.

Playing for Bulgaria at the Fed Cup, Nedeva has accumulated a win–loss record of 0–3 (all doubles).

== ITF Circuit finals ==
=== Doubles: 31 (19 titles, 12 runner–ups) ===
Legend $100,000 tournaments $75,000 tournaments $50,000 tournaments $25,000 tournaments $10,000 tournaments	Finals by surface Hard (3–2) Clay (16–10) Grass (0–0) Carpet (0–0)

Result	W–L	Date	Tournament	Tier	Surface	Partner	Opponents	Score
Loss	0–1	Feb 1993	ITF Amadora, Portugal	10,000	Hard	(Hungary) Virág Csurgó	(Netherlands) Lara Bitter (Netherlands) Maaike Koutstaal	0–6, 6–3, 2–6
Loss	0–2	Mar 1993	ITF Ramat HaSharon, Israel	10,000	Hard	(Bulgaria) Galia Angelova	(Israel) Nelly Barkan (Ukraine) Tessa Shapovalova	2–6, 6–7^{(5)}
Loss	0–3	May 1993	ITF Bytom, Poland	10,000	Clay	(Bulgaria) Antoaneta Pandjerova	(Ukraine) Natalia Biletskaya (Ukraine) Elena Tatarkova	w/o
Loss	0–4	Jun 1993	ITF Sofia, Bulgaria	10,000	Clay	(Bulgaria) Galia Angelova	(Argentina) Laura Montalvo (Argentina) Valentina Solari	6–7^{(6)}, 6–2, 6–7^{(4)}
Loss	0–5	Jun 1993	ITF Plovdiv, Bulgaria	10,000	Clay	(Bulgaria) Galia Angelova	(Bulgaria) Tzvetelina Nikolova (Bulgaria) Antoaneta Pandjerova	3–6, 3–6
Win	1–5	Feb 1994	ITF Faro, Portugal	10,000	Hard	(Bulgaria) Antoaneta Pandjerova	(Japan) Keiko Ishida (Japan) Yoriko Yamagishi	6–1, 6–3
Win	2–5	Feb 1994	ITF Amadora, Portugal	10,000	Hard	(Bulgaria) Antoaneta Pandjerova	(Russia) Alina Jidkova (Russia) Anna Linkova	6–3, 6–1
Loss	2–6	Apr 1994	ITF Supetar, Croatia	10,000	Clay	(Bulgaria) Antoaneta Pandjerova	(Argentina) María Fernanda Landa (Argentina) Laura Montalvo	4–6, 2–6
Win	3–6	Apr 1994	ITF Bol, Croatia	10,000	Clay	(Bulgaria) Antoaneta Pandjerova	(Czech Republic) Martina Hautová (Czech Republic) Blanka Kumbárová	6–3, 7–5
Win	4–6	Aug 1994	ITF Plovdiv, Bulgaria	10,000	Clay	(Bulgaria) Antoaneta Pandjerova	(Bulgaria) Dora Djilianova (Bulgaria) Desislava Topalova	6–4, 4–6, 6–2
Win	5–6	Sep 1994	ITF Varna, Bulgaria	10,000	Clay	(Ukraine) Natalia Bondarenko	(Netherlands) Lara Bitter (Netherlands) Aafje Evers	6–1, 6–4
Win	6–6	Oct 1994	ITF Burgas, Bulgaria	10,000	Clay	(Bulgaria) Antoaneta Pandjerova	(Slovakia) Patrícia Marková (Netherlands) Henriëtte van Aalderen	2–6, 6–4, 6–0
Win	7–6	Mar 1995	ITF Alicante, Spain	10,000	Clay	(Japan) Miho Saeki	(Spain) Patricia Aznar (Spain) Elisa Peñalvo López	6–3, 6–1
Win	8–6	Apr 1995	ITF Plovdiv, Bulgaria	25,000	Clay	(Bulgaria) Antoaneta Pandjerova	(Moldova) Svetlana Komleva (Ukraine) Irina Sukhova	7–5, 6–1
Loss	8–7	Jun 1995	ITF Lodz, Poland	10,000	Clay	(Greece) Christina Zachariadou	(Russia) Evgenia Kulikovskaya (Ukraine) Natalia Nemchinova	7–6^{(2)}, 3–6, 3–6
Win	9–7	Jun 1995	ITF Bytom, Poland	10,000	Clay	(Poland) Katharzyna Teodorowicz	(Russia) Evgenia Kulikovskaya (Ukraine) Natalia Nemchinova	6–2, 6–2
Loss	9–8	Aug 1995	ITF Carthage, Tunisia	10,000	Clay	(Ukraine) Talina Beiko	(Spain) Yolanda Clemot (Argentina) María Fernanda Landa	3–6, 2–6
Win	10–8	Nov 1995	ITF Cairo, Egypt	10,000	Clay	(Bulgaria) Antoaneta Pandjerova	(Israel) Limor Gabai (Israel) Hila Rosen	3–6, 6–1, 7–6^{(8)}
Win	11–8	Nov 1995	ITF Cairo, Egypt	10,000	Clay	(Bulgaria) Antoaneta Pandjerova	(France) Kildine Chevalier (Ukraine) Tessa Shapovalova	5–7, 6–3, 6–0
Win	12–8	May 1996	ITF Nitra, Slovakia	10,000	Clay	(Belarus) Vera Zhukovets	(Slovakia) Zuzana Váleková (Slovakia) Gabriela Voleková	w/o
Win	13–8	May 1996	ITF Prešov, Slovakia	10,000	Clay	(Czech Republic) Monika Maštalířová	(Slovakia) Ľudmila Cervanová (Slovakia) Martina Nedelková	6–4, 6–3
Win	14–8	Jul 1996	ITF Fiumicino, Italy	10,000	Clay	(Romania) Andreea Ehritt-Vanc	(Italy) Gabriella Boschiero (Italy) Sara Ventura	6–0, 6–3
Loss	14–9	Aug 1996	ITF Catania, Italy	10,000	Clay	(Russia) Alina Jidkova	(Italy) Katia Altilia (Italy) Laura Fodorean	6–1, 4–6, 3–6
Loss	14–10	Sep 1996	ITF Sofia, Bulgaria	25,000	Clay	(Bulgaria) Antoaneta Pandjerova	(Argentina) Laura Montalvo (Czech Republic) Lenka Němečková	2–6, 0–6
Win	15–10	Nov 1996	ITF Ismailia, Egypt	10,000	Clay	(Slovenia) Katarina Srebotnik	(Israel) Shiri Burstein (Netherlands) Debby Haak	6–4, 6–4
Win	16–10	May 1997	ITF Sofia, Bulgaria	10,000	Clay	(North Macedonia) Marina Lazarovska	(France) Marina Caiazzo (Federal Republic of Yugoslavia) Katarina Mišić	6–4, 6–2
Loss	16–11	May 1997	ITF Novi Sad, Yugoslavia	10,000	Clay	(Federal Republic of Yugoslavia) Dragana Zarić	(Italy) Tathiana Garbin (San Marino) Francesca Guardigli	4–6, 4–6
Win	17–11	May 1997	ITF Skopje, Macedonia	10,000	Clay	(Federal Republic of Yugoslavia) Dragana Zarić	(Italy) Laura Fodorean (Italy) Katia Altilia	6–3, 6–2
Win	18–11	Jun 1997	ITF Burgas, Bulgaria	10,000	Hard	(Bulgaria) Pavlina Nola	(Germany) Meike Fröhlich (Croatia) Kristina Pojatina	6–1, 6–2
Loss	18–12	May 1998	ITF Sofia, Bulgaria	10,000	Clay	(Bulgaria) Desislava Topalova	(Czech Republic) Olga Blahotová (Czech Republic) Michaela Paštiková	5–7, 6–7^{(5)}
Win	19–12	Jul 1997	ITF Skopje, Macedonia	10,000	Clay	(Bulgaria) Antoaneta Pandjerova	(Bulgaria) Filipa Gabrovska (Bulgaria) Radoslava Topalova	6–3, 6–0

== Fed Cup ==
Teodora Nedeva debuted for the Bulgaria Fed Cup team in 1996.

=== Doubles ===
Edition	Round	Date	Partner	Against	Surface	Opponents	W/L	Result
1996 World Group II Play-Offs	PO	14 July 1996	(Bulgaria) Pavlina Nola	South Korea	Clay	(South Korea) Choi Ju-yeon (South Korea) Choi Young-ja	L	4–6, 6–4, 6–7^{(3–7)}
1997 Europe/Africa Group I	RR	23 April 1997	(Bulgaria) Desislava Topalova	Russia	Clay	(Russia) Anna Kournikova (Russia) Elena Likhovtseva	L	2–6, 7–6^{(9–7)}, 0–6
1997 Europe/Africa Group I	RR	24 April 1997	(Bulgaria) Desislava Topalova	Greece	Clay	(Greece) Christína Papadáki (Greece) Christina Zachariadou	L	2–6, 1–6

- RR = Round Robin
- PPO = Promotion Play-off
