= Patrícia Marková =

Slovak tennis player

- Full name: Patrícia Marková Rogulski
- Country (sports): Slovakia
- Born: 5 January 1973 (age 53)
- Prize money: $32,101

Singles
- Career record: 57–68
- Career titles: 1 ITF
- Highest ranking: No. 329 (28 August 1995)

Doubles
- Career record: 108–55
- Career titles: 14 ITF
- Highest ranking: No. 121 (20 February 1995)
Medal record
Tennis
Representing Slovakia
Summer Universiade
Bronze medal – third place	1993 Buffalo	Mixed Doubles
Bronze medal – third place	1995 Fukuofa	Mixed Doubles
Bronze medal – third place	1997 Sicily	Women's doubles
Bronze medal – third place	1997 Sicily	Mixed Doubles
Bronze medal – third place	1999 Palma de Mallorca	Women's doubles

Patrícia Marková Rogulski (born 5 January 1973) is a Slovak former professional tennis player.

== Biography ==
Marková, who comes from Trnava, competed on the professional tour in the 1990s. She combined her tennis career with university study and regularly represented Slovakia at the Summer Universiade, winning four bronze medals.

On the professional tour, she reached a best singles ranking of 329 in the world and featured in the main draw of the 1995 TVA Cup in Nagoya. As a doubles player she won 14 ITF titles, with a best world ranking of 121.

After retiring in 1998, Marková played club tennis in Austria for several years and married local coach Bogdan Rogulski, formerly of Poland. The couple run a tennis club in Madunice, Slovakia.

== ITF finals ==
Legend
$75,000 tournaments
$25,000 tournaments
$10,000 tournaments

=== Singles (1–0) ===
Result	No.	Date	Tournament	Surface	Opponent	Score
Win	1.	17 January 1994	Orense, Spain	Carpet	(France) Peggy Rouquier	6–3, 6–1

=== Doubles (14–9) ===
Result	No.	Date	Tournament	Surface	Partner	Opponents	Score
Win	1.	26 July 1993	Istanbul, Turkey	Hard	(Netherlands) Nathalie Thijssen	(Switzerland) Emmanuelle Gagliardi (Italy) Alessia Sciarpelletti	2–6, 6–3, 6–0
Win	2.	16 August 1993	Bergisch Gladbach, Germany	Clay	(Czech Republic) Monika Kratochvílová	(Czech Republic) Gabriela Chmelinová (Slovakia) Simona Nedorostová	6–3, 6–2
Loss	3.	19 September 1993	Sofia, Bulgaria	Clay	(Slovakia) Zuzana Nemšáková	(Bulgaria) Galia Angelova (Bulgaria) Lubomira Bacheva	0–6, 5–7
Win	4.	17 January 1994	Orense, Spain	Carpet	(Italy) Germana Di Natale	(Netherlands) Stephanie Gomperts (Netherlands) Nathalie Thijssen	7–5, 6–3
Win	5.	24 January 1994	Pontevedra, Spain	Carpet	(Netherlands) Henriëtte van Aalderen	(Spain) Marta Cano (Spain) Cristina De Subijana	6–3, 6–2
Loss	6.	14 March 1994	Zaragoza, Spain	Clay	(Spain) Alicia Ortuño	(Czech Republic) Jindra Gabrisova (Czech Republic) Dominika Gorecká	5–7, 7–5, 4–6
Win	7.	21 March 1994	Castellon, Spain	Carpet	(Czech Republic) Ivana Havrlíková	(Argentina) Maria Ines Araiz (Brazil) Vanessa Menga	4–6, 6–3, 6–3
Win	8.	10 April 1994	Athens, Greece	Clay	(Slovakia) Simona Nedorostová	(Netherlands) Sandra van der Aa (Bulgaria) Lubomira Bacheva	6–3, 6–0
Loss	9.	13 June 1994	Sopot, Poland	Clay	(Slovakia) Katarína Studeníková	(Slovakia) Janette Husárová (Slovakia) Radka Zrubáková	2–6, 5–7
Loss	10.	26 September 1994	Burgas, Bulgaria	Clay	(Netherlands) Henriëtte van Aalderen	(Bulgaria) Antoaneta Pandjerova (Bulgaria) Teodora Nedeva	6–2, 4–6, 0–6
Loss	11.	14 November 1994	Buenos Aires, Argentina	Clay	(Japan) Yuka Tanaka	(Argentina) Laura Montalvo (Argentina) Mercedes Paz	4–6, 3–6
Loss	12.	21 November 1994	La Plata, Argentina	Clay	(Japan) Yuka Tanaka	(Hungary) Virág Csurgó (Hungary) Petra Mandula	6–7, 5–7
Win	13.	3 April 1994	Athens, Greece	Clay	(Czech Republic) Denisa Chládková	(United States) Corina Morariu (Greece) Christina Zachariadou	6–2, 7–5
Loss	14.	25 August 1996	Bad Nauheim, Germany	Clay	(Slovakia) Simona Galiková	(Germany) Meike Fröhlich (Bulgaria) Pavlina Nola	6–7, 6–7
Win	15.	29 September 1996	Šibenik, Croatia	Clay	(Slovakia) Katarina Valkyová	(Slovakia) Michaela Hasanová (Slovakia) Martina Nedelková	6–4, 4–6, 6–4
Win	16.	7 October 1996	Burgdorf, Switzerland	Carpet (i)	(Czech Republic) Denisa Sobotková	(Madagascar) Natacha Randriantefy (Switzerland) Aliénor Tricerri	6–3, 6–4
Loss	17.	24 February 1997	Jaffa, Israel	Hard	(Hungary) Nóra Köves	(Czech Republic) Milena Nekvapilová (Czech Republic) Hana Šromová	4–6, 2–6
Win	18.	7 April 1997	Hvar, Croatia	Clay	(Slovakia) Zuzana Váleková	(United Kingdom) Julie Pullin (United Kingdom) Amanda Wainwright	7–6^{(3)}, 6–4
Win	19.	17 April 1997	Dubrovnik, Croatia	Clay	(Slovakia) Zuzana Váleková	(Czech Republic) Milena Nekvapilová (Czech Republic) Hana Šromová	2–6, 7–5, 6–4
Win	20.	10 November 1997	Rio de Janeiro, Brazil	Clay	(Slovakia) Zuzana Váleková	(Czech Republic) Monika Maštalířová (Argentina) Paula Racedo	6–0, 6–7^{(4)}, 6–2
Win	21.	17 May 1998	Nitra, Slovakia	Clay	(Slovakia) Silvia Uricková	(Ukraine) Tatiana Kovaltchouk (Ukraine) Anna Zaporozhanova	6–0, 6–3
Win	22.	30 August 1998	Middelkerke, Belgium	Clay	(Argentina) Luciana Masante	(Netherlands) Bretchtje Bruls (Belgium) Cindy Schuurmans	2–6, 6–3, 6–3
Loss	23.	7 September 1998	Fano, Italy	Clay	(Slovenia) Petra Rampre	(Spain) Lourdes Domínguez Lino (Italy) Laura Dell'Angelo	6–7, 6–2, 3–6
