= Dora Djilianova =

Bulgarian tennis player

Dora Lane
- Full name: Dora Lane (Djilianova)
- Country (sports): Bulgaria
- Born: 13 January 1976 (age 49) Plovdiv, Bulgaria
- Prize money: US$ 15,068

Singles
- Career record: 53–38
- Career titles: 0 WTA, 1 ITF
- Highest ranking: No. 327 (23 October 1995)

Doubles
- Career record: 34–30
- Career titles: 0 WTA, 2 ITF
- Highest ranking: No. 237 (7 August 1995)

Team competitions
- Fed Cup: 0–1 (doubles 0–1)

Dora Lane (born 13 January 1976) is a former professional tennis player from Bulgaria. She competed as Dora Djilianova.

== Biography ==
Originally from Plovdiv, Lane competed on the ITF Circuit during the 1990s, reaching a best ranking of 327 in the world. Most notably she represented the Bulgaria Fed Cup team in a 1995 World Group Play-off against South Africa in Bloemfontein. She played in the doubles rubber, which she and partner Lubomira Bacheva lost to Amanda Coetzer and Elna Reinach.

Lane left the professional tennis circuit in 1996 to take up a scholarship to California State University, Fresno. As a senior, she was ranked as high as fourth in the country. She is now based in Reno, Nevada and works as an employment attorney.

== ITF Circuit finals ==
=== Singles: 3 (1 title, 2 runner–ups) ===
Legend $100,000 tournaments $75,000 tournaments $50,000 tournaments $25,000 tournaments $10,000 tournaments	Finals by surface Hard (0–0) Clay (1–2) Grass (0–0) Carpet (0–0)

Result	W–L	Date	Tournament	Tier	Surface	Opponent	Score
Loss	0–1	Aug 1994	ITF Plovdiv, Bulgaria	10,000	Clay	(Czech Republic) Monika Maštalířová	2–6, 4–6
Win	1–1	Sep 1994	ITF Varna, Bulgaria	10,000	Clay	(Bulgaria) Galia Angelova	6–4, 6–3
Loss	1–2	Sep 1995	ITF Varna, Bulgaria	10,000	Clay	(Bolivia) Cecilia Ampuero	0–6, 5–7

=== Doubles: 5 (2 titles, 3 runner–ups) ===
Legend $100,000 tournaments $75,000 tournaments $50,000 tournaments $25,000 tournaments $10,000 tournaments	Finals by surface Hard (1–1) Clay (1–2) Grass (0–0) Carpet (0–0)

Result	W–L	Date	Tournament	Tier	Surface	Partner	Opponents	Score
Loss	0–1	Aug 1994	ITF Plovdiv, Bulgaria	10,000	Clay	(Bulgaria) Desislava Topalova	(Bulgaria) Teodora Nedeva (Bulgaria) Antoaneta Pandjerova	4–6, 6–4, 2–6
Win	1–1	Sep 1994	ITF Varna, Bulgaria	10,000	Hard	(Bulgaria) Desislava Topalova	(Bulgaria) Galina Dimitrova (Germany) Claudia Timm	6–3, 7–5
Loss	1–2	Feb 1995	ITF Istanbul, Turkey	10,000	Hard	(Bulgaria) Desislava Topalova	(United States) Corina Morariu (Greece) Christina Zachariadou	3–6, 5–7
Win	2–2	Sep 1995	ITF Varna, Bulgaria	10,000	Clay	(Bulgaria) Pavlina Nola	(Bulgaria) Galina Dimitrova (Bulgaria) Desislava Topalova	4–6, 6–4, 7–5
Loss	2–3	Oct 1995	ITF Bucharest, Romania	25,000	Clay	(Bulgaria) Pavlina Nola	(Germany) Angela Kerek (Germany) Maja Živec-Škulj	2–6, 7–6^{(7–5)}, 3–6
