= Pavlina Nola =

Bulgarian-New Zealander tennis player

Pavlina Stoyanova-Nola Павлина Стоянова-Нола
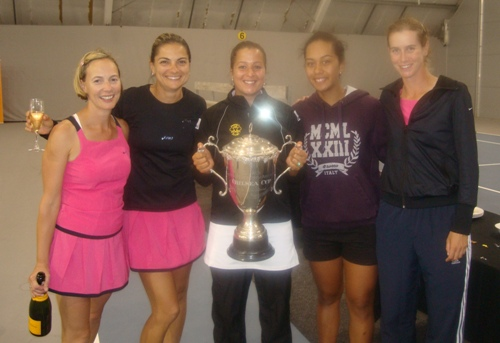
- Campbells Bay Tennis Club, Auckland- Women's Chelsea Cup Team, 2010; Pavlina Nola shown second from the left
- Country (sports): Bulgaria (1995–2001); New Zealand (2001-02)
- Residence: Auckland, New Zealand
- Born: 14 July 1974 (age 50); Varna, Bulgaria
- Turned pro: 1995
- Retired: 2002
- Plays: Right-handed (two-handed backhand)
- Prize money: US$ 416,682

Singles
- Career record: 240–180
- Career titles: 0 WTA, 7 ITF
- Highest ranking: No. 68 (14 May 2001)

Grand Slam singles results
- Australian Open: 1R (1999, 2001, 2002)
- French Open: 1R (1998, 1999, 2000, 2001)
- Wimbledon: 1R (1998, 1999, 2001)
- US Open: 2R (1998, 2000)

Doubles
- Career record: 79–86
- Career titles: 1 WTA, 8 ITF
- Highest ranking: No. 87 (3 August 1998)

Team competitions
- Fed Cup: 5–7 (singles 4–4; doubles 1-3)

Pavlina Stoyanova-Nola (Bulgarian: Павлина Стоянова-Нола) (born 14 July 1974) is a former tennis player who played for both Bulgaria (up to May 2001) and New Zealand (since June 2001) in her professional career.

== Tennis career ==
Nola turned professional in 1995. She reached her career high ranking of No. 68 in the world on 14 May 2001. The best singles result of her career was finishing runner-up to Henrieta Nagyová at a WTA tournament in Palermo where she lost 3–6, 5–7. She also one won doubles title at the same tournament two years previously with Elena Pampoulova-Wagner. She played her last match in 2002, losing in the first round of the 2002 Australian Open to Janette Husárová.

Captain of Campbells Bay Tennis Club – Chelsea Cup team 2010 — Pavlina Nola was Captain of Campbell's Bay Tennis Club Chelsea Cup team in 2010. The Chelsea Cup is the premier club tennis league competition for North Shore City in New Zealand. Campbells Bay Tennis Club is a large tennis club based in the best location on the shore.

Pavlina was successful winning captain leading a team consisting of Franziska Etzel, Kairangi Vano, Vicki Wild and Charlotte Roberts. Such was Pavlina's dominance in the competition that in the nine matches she ended with astonishing statistics of playing nine matches and winning 108 games and giving the opposition only 14 games.

== WTA career finals ==
=== Singles: 1 (1 runner–up) ===
Legend Grand Slam tournaments (0–0) Tier I tournaments (0–0) Tier II tournaments (0–0) Tier III tournaments (0–0) Tier IV tournaments (0–1) Tier V tournaments (0–0)	Finals by surface Hard (0–0) Clay (0–1) Grass (0–0) Carpet (0–0)

Result	W–L	Date	Tournament	Tier	Surface	Opponent	Score
Loss	0–1	Jul 2000	Palermo, Italy	Tier IV	Clay	(Slovakia) Henrieta Nagyová	3–6, 5–7

=== Doubles: 1 (1 title) ===
Legend Grand Slam tournaments (0–0) Tier I tournaments (0–0) Tier II tournaments (0–0) Tier III tournaments (0–0) Tier IV tournaments (1–0) Tier V tournaments (0–0)	Finals by surface Hard (0–0) Clay (1–0) Grass (0–0) Carpet (0–0)

Result	W–L	Date	Tournament	Tier	Surface	Partner	Opponents	Score
Win	1–0	Jul 1998	Palermo, Italy	Tier IV	Clay	(Germany) Elena Pampoulova	(Austria) Barbara Schett (Switzerland) Patty Schnyder	6–4, 6–2

== ITF Circuit finals ==
=== Singles: 12 (7 titles, 5 runner–ups) ===
Legend $100,000 tournaments $75,000 tournaments $50,000 tournaments $25,000 tournaments $10,000 tournaments	Finals by surface Hard (3–2) Clay (4–3) Grass (0–0) Carpet (0–0)

Result	W–L	Date	Tournament	Tier	Surface	Opponent	Score
Win	1–0	Oct 1994	ITF Burgas, Bulgaria	10,000	Hard	(Netherlands) Henriëtte van Aalderen	7–5, 6–0
Win	2–0	Aug 1995	ITF Wahlscheid, Germany	10,000	Clay	(Poland) Monika Starosta	6–4, 6–1
Win	3–0	Sep 1995	ITF Bad Nauheim, Germany	10,000	Clay	(Czech Republic) Alena Havrlíková	3–6, 6–3, 6–4
Loss	3–1	Aug 1996	ITF Horb, Germany	10,000	Clay	(South Korea) Choi Ju-yeon	3–6, 1–6
Win	4–1	Aug 1996	ITF Bad Nauheim, Germany	10,000	Clay	(Germany) Lisa Fritz	6–3, 7–6^{(7–2)}
Win	5–1	Feb 1997	ITF Faro, Portugal	10,000	Hard	(Germany) Athina Briegel	6–4, 6–1
Loss	5–2	Apr 1997	ITF Dubrovnik, Croatia	10,000	Clay	(Czech Republic) Milena Nekvapilová	2–6, 6–0, 2–6
Win	6–2	Jul 1997	ITF Darmstadt, Germany	25,000	Clay	(Romania) Raluca Sandu	6–4, 6–1
Loss	6–3	Sep 1997	ITF Sofia, Bulgaria	25,000	Clay	(Spain) Ana Alcázar	6–2, 3–6, 1–6
Win	7–3	Oct 1998	ITF Indian Wells, United States	25,000	Hard	(South Korea) Kim Eun-ha	6–3, 6–4
Loss	7–4	Apr 2000	ITF Norcross, United States	25,000	Hard	(United States) Marissa Irvin	2–6, 3–6
Loss	7–5	Nov 2001	ITF Port Pirie, Australia	25,000	Hard	(Japan) Saori Obata	1–6, 2–6

=== Doubles: 11 (8 titles, 3 runner–ups) ===
Legend $100,000 tournaments $75,000 tournaments $50,000 tournaments $25,000 tournaments $10,000 tournaments	Finals by surface Hard (2–0) Clay (6–3) Grass (0–0) Carpet (0–0)

Result	W–L	Date	Tournament	Tier	Surface	Partner	Opponents	Score
Loss	0–1	Aug 1995	ITF Horb, Germany	10,000	Carpet	(Russia) Anna Linkova	(Czech Republic) Ivana Havrlíková (Czech Republic) Monika Kratochvílová	2–6, 5–7
Win	1–1	Sep 1995	ITF Bad Nauheim, Germany	10,000	Clay	(Germany) Renata Kochta	(Czech Republic) Dominika Górecka (Czech Republic) Petra Plačková	7–6, 6–2
Win	2–1	Sep 1995	ITF Varna, Bulgaria	10,000	Clay	(Bulgaria) Dora Djilianova	(Bulgaria) Galina Dimitrova (Bulgaria) Desislava Topalova	4–6, 6–4, 7–5
Loss	2–2	Oct 1995	ITF Bucharest, Romania	25,000	Clay	(Bulgaria) Dora Djilianova	(Germany) Angela Kerek (Germany) Maja Živec-Škulj	2–6, 7–6^{(7–5)}, 3–6
Win	3–2	Aug 1996	ITF Bad Nauheim, Germany	10,000	Clay	(Germany) Meike Fröhlich	(Slovakia) Simona Galikova (Slovakia) Patrícia Marková	7–6^{(7–4)}, 7–6^{(12–10)}
Win	4–2	Sep 1996	ITF Albena, Bulgaria	10,000	Clay	(Bulgaria) Antoaneta Pandjerova	(Bulgaria) Galina Dimitrova (Bulgaria) Desislava Topalova	6–4, 6–2
Win	5–2	Jun 1997	ITF Burgas, Bulgaria	10,000	Hard	(Bulgaria) Teodora Nedeva	(Germany) Meike Fröhlich (Croatia) Kristina Pojatina	6–1, 6–2
Win	6–2	Jul 1997	ITF Darmstadt, Germany	25,000	Clay	(Bulgaria) Svetlana Krivencheva	(Russia) Olga Ivanova (Poland) Magdalena Feistel	6–0, 2–6, 6–3
Win	7–2	Jul 1997	ITF Rostock, Germany	25,000	Clay	(Bulgaria) Svetlana Krivencheva	(Australia) Renee Reid (Hungary) Réka Vidáts	w/o
Loss	7–3	Aug 1997	ITF Bratislava, Slovakia	75,000	Clay	(Bulgaria) Svetlana Krivencheva	(Belgium) Laurence Courtois (Slovakia) Henrieta Nagyová	1–6, 0–6
Win	8–3	Oct 1998	ITF Indian Wells, United States	25,000	Hard	(United States) Lindsay Lee-Waters	(United States) Erika deLone (United States) Katie Schlukebir	6–0, 6–7^{(4–7)}, 6–1

== Fed Cup ==
Pavlina Nola debuted for the Bulgaria Fed Cup team in 1995. Since then, she has a 4–4 singles record and a 1–3 doubles record (5–7 overall).

=== Singles (4–4) ===
Edition	Round	Date	Against	Surface	Opponent	W/L	Result
1995 World Group I Play-Offs	PO	22 July 1995	South Africa	Hard	(South Africa) Amanda Coetzer	L	0–6, 1–6
1995 World Group I Play-Offs	PO	23 July 1995	South Africa	Hard	(South Africa) Joannette Kruger	L	3–6, 1–6
1996 World Group II Play-Offs	PO	13 July 1996	South Korea	Clay	(South Korea) Kim Eun-ha	W	3–6, 6–0, 6–1
1996 World Group II Play-Offs	PO	14 July 1996	South Korea	Clay	(South Korea) Park Sung-hee	L	3–6, 5–7
1999 Europe/Africa Group I	RR	19 April 1999	Yugoslavia	Clay	(Socialist Federal Republic of Yugoslavia) Dragana Zarić	W	6–1, 6–2
1999 Europe/Africa Group I	RR	20 April 1999	Finland	Clay	(Finland) Hanna-Katri Aalto	W	6–3, 6–1
1999 Europe/Africa Group I	RR	21 April 1999	Great Britain	Clay	(United Kingdom) Samantha Smith	W	7–6^{(7–4)}, 6–4
1999 Europe/Africa Group I	PPO	22 April 1999	Slovenia	Clay	(Slovenia) Katarina Srebotnik	L	2–6, 2–6

=== Doubles (1–3) ===
Edition	Round	Date	Partner	Against	Surface	Opponents	W/L	Result
1996 World Group II	PO	28 April 1996	(Bulgaria) Antoaneta Pandjerova	Slovakia	Clay	(Slovakia) Henrieta Nagyová (Slovakia) Radka Zrubáková	L	7–5, 3–6, 1–6
1996 World Group II Play-Offs	PO	14 July 1996	(Bulgaria) Teodora Nedeva	South Korea	Clay	(South Korea) Choi Ju-yeon (South Korea) Choi Young-ja	L	4–6, 6–4, 6–7^{(3–7)}
1999 Europe/Africa Group I	RR	19 April 1999	(Bulgaria) Desislava Topalova	(Socialist Federal Republic of Yugoslavia) Yugoslavia	Clay	(Socialist Federal Republic of Yugoslavia) Branka Bojović (Socialist Federal Republic of Yugoslavia) Dragana Zarić	W	6–2, 6–2
1999 Europe/Africa Group I	RR	21 April 1999	(Bulgaria) Desislava Topalova	(United Kingdom) Great Britain	Clay	(United Kingdom) Julie Pullin (United Kingdom) Joanne Ward	L	3–6, 5–7

- RR = Round Robin
- PPO = Promotion Play-Off

== Grand Slam singles performance timeline ==
Key
W	F	SF	QF	#R	RR	Q#	DNQ	A	NH

(W) winner; (F) finalist; (SF) semifinalist; (QF) quarterfinalist; (#R) rounds 4, 3, 2, 1; (RR) round-robin stage; (Q#) qualification round; (DNQ) did not qualify; (A) absent; (NH) not held; (SR) strike rate (events won / competed); (W–L) win–loss record.

Tournament	1995	1996	1997	1998	1999	2000	2001	2002	Career SR	Win–loss
Australian Open	A	A	A	Q2	1R	1R	1R	1R	0 / 4	0–4
French Open	A	A	A	1R	1R	1R	1R	A	0 / 4	0–4
Wimbledon	A	A	A	1R	1R	Q3	1R	A	0 / 3	0–3
US Open	A	A	1R	2R	1R	2R	1R	A	0 / 5	2–5
SR	0 / 0	0 / 0	0 / 1	0 / 3	0 / 4	0 / 3	0 / 4	0 / 1	0 / 16	2–16
