= Ljiljana Nanušević =

- Country (sports): Yugoslavia; Serbia and Montenegro
- Born: 2 August 1981 (age 43)
- Prize money: $20,205

Singles
- Career titles: 1 ITF
- Highest ranking: No. 520 (22 February 1999)

Doubles
- Career titles: 2 ITF
- Highest ranking: No. 358 (12 June 2000)

Ljiljana Nanušević (born 2 August 1981) is a Serbian former professional tennis player who played in the Fed Cup for Yugoslavia.

Nanušević made all of her Fed Cup appearances in the 1997 Fed Cup, while aged only 15. Playing in a total of five ties, she played doubles in each of them, as well as singles once, managing to win every rubber.

She won an ITF singles tournament in Istanbul in 2001 and won a further two ITF titles in doubles.

== ITF finals ==
=== Singles: 2 (1–1) ===
Outcome	No.	Date	Tournament	Surface	Opponent	Score
Runner-up	1.	1 June 1998	Burgas, Bulgaria	Hard	(Belgium) Cindy Schuurmans	2–6, 1–6
Winner	1.	30 July 2001	Istanbul, Turkey	Hard	(Russia) Gulnara Fattakhetdinova	6–4, 1–6, 6–2

=== Doubles: 11 (2–9) ===
Outcome	No.	Date	Tournament	Surface	Partner	Opponents	Score
Runner-up	1.	31 August 1998	Xanthi, Greece	Hard	(Federal Republic of Yugoslavia) Dragana Ilić	(Greece) Eleni Daniilidou (Greece) Evagelia Roussi	0–6, 3–6
Runner-up	2.	7 December 1998	Ismailia, Egypt	Clay	(Slovakia) Gabriela Voleková	(Georgia (country)) Nino Louarsabishvili (Morocco) Bahia Mouhtassine	3–6, 3–6
Winner	1.	27 September 1999	Skopje, Macedonia	Clay	(North Macedonia) Marina Lazarovska	(Romania) Ramona But (Romania) Ioana Gaspar	6–4, 5–7, 6–3
Runner-up	3.	4 October 1999	Sofia, Bulgaria	Clay	(Romania) Ramona But	(Bulgaria) Filipa Gabrovska (Bulgaria) Radoslava Topalova	2–6, 0–6
Runner-up	4.	4 June 2000	Skopje, Macedonia	Clay	(Bulgaria) Biljana Pawlowa-Dimitrova	(Federal Republic of Yugoslavia) Katarina Mišić (North Macedonia) Marina Lazarovska	6–7^{(6–8)}, 3–6
Runner-up	5.	11 September 2000	Biograd, Croatia	Clay	(Bosnia and Herzegovina) Mervana Jugić-Salkić	(Austria) Bianca Kamper (Austria) Stefanie Haidner	3–6, 7–5, 5–7
Runner-up	6.	30 September 2001	Belgrade, Serbia	Clay	(Federal Republic of Yugoslavia) Dragana Ilić	(Switzerland) Myriam Casanova (Switzerland) Daniela Casanova	2–6, 5–7
Runner-up	7.	7 October 2001	Novi Sad, Serbia	Clay	(Federal Republic of Yugoslavia) Ana Četnik	(Switzerland) Myriam Casanova (Switzerland) Daniela Casanova	1–6, 1–6
Runner-up	8.	5 April 2004	Cavtat, Croatia	Clay	(Slovakia) Lenka Tvarošková	(Croatia) Nadja Pavić (Croatia) Ivana Višić	6–7^{(1–7)}, 6–7^{(6–8)}
Winner	2.	6 June 2004	Palić, Serbia and Montenegro	Clay	(Serbia and Montenegro) Ana Četnik	(Serbia and Montenegro) Karolina Jovanović (Serbia and Montenegro) Nataša Zorić	w/o
Runner-up	9.	14 June 2004	Podgorica, Serbia and Montenegro	Clay	(Serbia and Montenegro) Marta Simić	(Germany) Andrea Petkovic (Russia) Sofia Avakova	3–6 ret.
