= Tzvetelina Nikolova =

Bulgarian tennis player

Tzvetelina Nikolova Цветелина Николова
- Country (sports): Bulgaria
- Born: 1 August 1971 (age 53); Plovdiv, Bulgaria
- Turned pro: 1988
- Retired: 1993
- Plays: Right-handed (double-handed backhand)
- Prize money: US$ 3,169

Singles
- Career record: 4–6
- Career titles: 0 WTA, 0 ITF

Doubles
- Career record: 28–11
- Career titles: 0 WTA, 4 ITF
- Highest ranking: No. 245 (5 October 1992)

Tzvetelina Nikolova (Bulgarian: Цветелина Николова, born 1 August 1971) is a retired professional tennis player from Bulgaria.

On 5 October 1992, she reached her highest WTA doubles ranking of 245. During her career Nikolova won a total of 4 ITF doubles titles.

Nikolova made her WTA main draw debut in 1989 at the Vitosha New Otani Open in Sofia partnering Ralitza Milorieva in the doubles event.

== ITF Circuit finals ==
=== Doubles: 4 (4 titles) ===
Legend $100,000 tournaments $75,000 tournaments $50,000 tournaments $25,000 tournaments $10,000 tournaments	Finals by surface Hard (0–0) Clay (4–0) Grass (0–0) Carpet (0–0)

Result	W–L	Date	Tournament	Tier	Surface	Partner	Opponents	Score
Win	1–0	Jun 1992	ITF Covilha, Portugal	10,000	Clay	(Bulgaria) Galia Angelova	(Japan) Hiroko Hara (Lithuania) Galina Misiuriova	7–5, 7–5
Win	2–0	Jun 1992	ITF Aveiro, Portugal	10,000	Hard	(Bulgaria) Galia Angelova	(France) Cecile Dorey (Spain) Gemma Magin	4–6, 6–3, 6–4
Win	3–0	Sep 1992	ITF Burgas, Bulgaria	10,000	Clay	(Bulgaria) Galia Angelova	(Bulgaria) Svetlana Krivencheva (Russia) Elena Likhovtseva	3–6, 6–4, 6–3
Win	4–0	Jun 1993	ITF Plovdiv, Bulgaria	10,000	Clay	(Bulgaria) Antoaneta Pandjerova	(Bulgaria) Galia Angelova (Bulgaria) Teodora Nedeva	6–3, 6–3
