= Galia Angelova =

Bulgarian tennis player

- Country (sports): Bulgaria
- Born: 10 November 1972 (age 53) Haskovo, Bulgaria
- Prize money: $20,132

Singles
- Career record: 67–40
- Career titles: 3 ITF
- Highest ranking: No. 378 (22 February 1993)

Doubles
- Career record: 53–27
- Career titles: 5 ITF
- Highest ranking: No. 231 (5 October 1992)

Team competitions
- Fed Cup: 6–5 (singles 3–2; doubles 3–3)

Galia Angelova (born 10 November 1972) is a Bulgarian former professional tennis player.

== Biography ==
Angelova, who comes from Haskovo, was a member of the Bulgaria Federation Cup team which competed in the 1988 and 1990 competitions, featuring in a total of eight ties. Her only WTA Tour main-draw appearance came in the doubles at the 1989 Vitosha New Otani Open in Sofia. She won three ITF singles titles and reached a best ranking of 378 in the world. As a doubles player, she was ranked as high as 231 and won five ITF doubles titles.

She is now a tennis coach and works at Dema Sport in Sofia.

== ITF Circuit finals ==
=== Singles: 4 (3 titles, 1 runner–up) ===
Legend $100,000 tournaments $75,000 tournaments $50,000 tournaments $25,000 tournaments $10,000 tournaments	Finals by surface Hard (1–0) Clay (2–1) Grass (0–0) Carpet (0–0)

Result	W–L	Date	Tournament	Tier	Surface	Opponent	Score
Win	1–0	Sep 1990	ITF Palermo, Italy	10,000	Clay	(Italy) Carmela Vitali	6–4, 6–3
Win	2–0	Mar 1992	ITF Ramat HaSharon, Israel	10,000	Hard	(Republic of Ireland) Gina Niland	6–4, 7–5
Win	3–0	Jun 1992	ITF Covilha, Portugal	10,000	Clay	(Portugal) Sofia Prazeres	3–6, 6–4, 6–1
Loss	3–1	Sep 1994	ITF Varna, Bulgaria	10,000	Clay	(Bulgaria) Dora Djilianova	4–6, 3–6

=== Doubles: 9 (5 titles, 4 runner–ups) ===
Legend $100,000 tournaments $75,000 tournaments $50,000 tournaments $25,000 tournaments $10,000 tournaments	Finals by surface Hard (1–1) Clay (4–3) Grass (0–0) Carpet (0–0)

Result	W–L	Date	Tournament	Tier	Surface	Partner	Opponents	Score
Win	1–0	Sep 1991	ITF Haskovo, Bulgaria	10,000	Clay	(Bulgaria) Lubomira Bacheva	(Soviet Union) Elena Pogorelova (Soviet Union) Irina Sukhova	7–6, 6–7, 6–1
Win	2–0	Jun 1992	ITF Covilha, Portugal	10,000	Clay	(Bulgaria) Tzvetelina Nikolova	(Japan) Hiroko Hara (Lithuania) Galina Misiuriova	7–5, 7–5
Win	3–0	Jun 1992	ITF Aveiro, Portugal	10,000	Hard	(Bulgaria) Tzvetelina Nikolova	(France) Cecile Dorey (Spain) Gemma Magin	4–6, 6–3, 6–4
Win	4–0	Sep 1992	ITF Burgas, Bulgaria	10,000	Clay	(Bulgaria) Tzvetelina Nikolova	(Bulgaria) Svetlana Krivencheva (Russia) Elena Likhovtseva	3–6, 6–4, 6–3
Loss	4–1	Sep 1992	ITF Sofia, Bulgaria	25,000	Clay	(Bulgaria) Lubomira Bacheva	(Commonwealth of Independent States) Karina Kuregian (Australia) Kirrily Sharpe	6–7, 2–6
Loss	4–2	Mar 1993	ITF Ramat HaSharon, Israel	10,000	Hard	(Bulgaria) Teodora Nedeva	(Israel) Nelly Barkan (Ukraine) Tessa Shapovalova	2–6, 6–7^{(5)}
Loss	4–3	Jun 1993	ITF Sofia, Bulgaria	10,000	Clay	(Bulgaria) Teodora Nedeva	(Argentina) Laura Montalvo (Argentina) Valentina Solari	6–7^{(6)}, 6–2, 6–7^{(4)}
Loss	4–4	Jun 1993	ITF Plovdiv, Bulgaria	10,000	Clay	(Bulgaria) Teodora Nedeva	(Bulgaria) Tzvetelina Nikolova (Bulgaria) Antoaneta Pandjerova	3–6, 3–6
Win	5–4	Sep 1993	ITF Sofia, Bulgaria	25,000	Clay	(Bulgaria) Lubomira Bacheva	(Slovakia) Patrícia Marková (Slovakia) Zuzana Nemšáková	6–0, 7–5
