= Lara Bitter =

Dutch tennis player

- Country (sports): Netherlands
- Born: 24 April 1975 (age 49)
- Prize money: $17,811

Singles
- Career titles: 1 ITF
- Highest ranking: No. 297 (27 February 1995)

Doubles
- Career titles: 6 ITF
- Highest ranking: No. 181 (31 October 1994)

Lara Bitter (born 24 April 1975) is a Dutch former professional tennis player.

Bitter was a junior doubles finalist at the 1993 French Open, partnering countrywoman Maaike Koutstaal. They were beaten in three sets by the Belgian pairing of Laurence Courtois and Nancy Feber.

On the professional circuit, Bitter reached a best singles ranking of 297 in the world and won an ITF tournament in Le Havre in 1994. As a doubles player she won a further six ITF titles, including four $25,000 events.

== ITF finals ==
=== Singles: 3 (1–2) ===
Result	No.	Date	Tournament	Surface	Opponent	Score
Loss	1.	30 August 1992	Gryfino, Poland	Clay	(Slovakia) Zuzana Nemšáková	4–6, 0–6
Loss	2.	22 February 1993	Oliveira de Azeméis, Portugal	Hard	(Netherlands) Linda Niemantsverdriet	7–6^{(7–5)}, 3–6, 2–6
Win	1.	28 November 1994	Le Havre, France	Clay	(Hungary) Kira Nagy	6–3, 7–5

=== Doubles: 8 (6–2) ===
Result	No.	Date	Tournament	Surface	Partner	Opponents	Score
Win	1.	15 February 1993	Amadora, Portugal	Hard	(Netherlands) Maaike Koutstaal	(Bulgaria) Virág Csurgó (Bulgaria) Teodora Nedeva	6–0, 3–6, 6–2
Loss	1.	22 February 1993	Lisbon, Portugal	Hard	(Netherlands) Kim de Weille	(Netherlands) Maaike Koutstaal (Netherlands) Linda Niemantsverdriet	4–6, 3–6
Win	2.	1 March 1993	Cascais, Portugal	Clay	(Netherlands) Amy van Buuren	(Czech Republic) Pavlína Rajzlová (Czech Republic) Helena Vildová	6–1, 2–6, 6–3
Win	3.	24 May 1993	Brindisi, Italy	Clay	(Netherlands) Petra Kamstra	(Germany) Angela Kerek (Romania) Irina Spîrlea	7–5, 4–6, 6–2
Win	4.	13 March 1994	Prostějov, Czech Republic	Hard	(Netherlands) Maaike Koutstaal	(Czech Republic) Květa Peschke (Czech Republic) Jana Pospíšilová	7–5, 6–3
Win	5.	28 March 1994	Alicante, Spain	Hard	(Colombia) Ximena Rodríguez	(Sweden) Maria-Farnes Capistrano (Netherlands) Aafje Evers	6–1, 6–4
Win	6.	3 July 1994	Vaihingen, Germany	Hard	(Netherlands) Maaike Koutstaal	(Australia) Nicole Pratt (Australia) Kirrily Sharpe	6–1, 6–2
Loss	2.	19 September 1994	Varna, Bulgaria	Clay	(Bulgaria) Teodora Nedeva	(Ukraine) Natalia Bondarenko (Netherlands) Aafje Evers	1–6, 4–6
