= Galina Dimitrova =

Bulgarian tennis player

- Full name: Galina Dimitrova Courson
- Country (sports): Bulgaria
- Born: 11 April 1978 (age 47)
- Prize money: US$ 12,332

Singles
- Career record: 46–49
- Career titles: 0 WTA, 0 ITF
- Highest ranking: No. 400 (7 October 1996)

Doubles
- Career record: 43–35
- Career titles: 0 WTA, 3 ITF
- Highest ranking: No. 316 (24 July 1995)

Team competitions
- Fed Cup: 0–2 (singles 0–2)

Galina Dimitrova Courson (born 11 April 1978) is a former professional tennis player from Bulgaria.

== Biography ==
Dimitrova spent her professional career on the ITF circuit, reaching a top singles ranking of 400 in the world. As a doubles player she had a best ranking of 316 and won three ITF titles. She represented the Bulgaria Fed Cup team in ties against Russia and Greece in 1997.

From 1998 to 2000, Dimitrova played college tennis for the University of North Georgia. A two-time Southern States Athletic Conference champion, she was both NAIA National Player of the Year and an All-American in 1999. Dimitrova, who was named All-American again in 2000, is a member of the UNG Athletics Hall of Fame.

She is now known as Galina Courson and is working as a financial advisor in Atlanta.

== ITF Circuit finals ==
=== Doubles: 7 (3 titles, 4 runner–ups) ===
Legend $100,000 tournaments $75,000 tournaments $50,000 tournaments $25,000 tournaments $10,000 tournaments	Finals by surface Hard (0–1) Clay (3–3) Grass (0–0) Carpet (0–0)

Result	W–L	Date	Tournament	Tier	Surface	Partner	Opponents	Score
Loss	0–1	Sep 1994	ITF Varna, Bulgaria	10,000	Hard	(Germany) Claudia Timm	(Bulgaria) Dora Djilianova (Bulgaria) Desislava Topalova	3–6, 5–7
Loss	0–2	Jun 1995	ITF Katowice, Poland	10,000	Clay	(Bulgaria) Desislava Topalova	(Czech Republic) Monika Kratochvílová (Czech Republic) Hana Šromová	3–6, 6–4, 3–6
Loss	0–3	Sep 1995	ITF Varna, Bulgaria	10,000	Clay	(Bulgaria) Desislava Topalova	(Bulgaria) Dora Djilianova (Bulgaria) Pavlina Nola	6–4, 4–6, 5–7
Win	1–3	Jun 1996	ITF Skopje, Macedonia	10,000	Clay	(Bulgaria) Antoaneta Pandjerova	(North Macedonia) Marina Lazarovska (Federal Republic of Yugoslavia) Katarina Mišić	6–4, 6–0
Loss	1–4	Sep 1996	ITF Albena, Bulgaria	10,000	Clay	(Bulgaria) Desislava Topalova	(Bulgaria) Antoaneta Pandjerova (Bulgaria) Pavlina Nola	4–6, 2–6
Win	2–4	Jun 1997	ITF Velp, Netherlands	10,000	Clay	(Bulgaria) Desislava Topalova	(Netherlands) Kim Kilsdonk (Netherlands) Jolanda Mens	5–7, 7–5, 6–4
Win	3–4	Sep 1997	ITF Albena, Bulgaria	10,000	Clay	(Bulgaria) Desislava Topalova	(Bulgaria) Lubomira Bacheva (Bulgaria) Antoaneta Pandjerova	7–5, 6–1
