= Maleeva sisters =

Tennis playing sisters

The Maleeva sisters (Bulgarian: сестри Малееви) refers to three professional tennis playing siblings from Bulgaria. They managed to be ranked among the top ten on the WTA singles world ranking; and are the only three sisters ever to reach the top ten.

- Manuela Maleeva (born 1967)
- Katerina Maleeva (born 1969)
- Magdalena Maleeva (born 1975)

== See also ==
- Yuliya Berberyan-Maleeva, mother and one-time coach of the Maleeva sisters.
