= Dimana Krastevitch =

Bulgarian tennis player

- Full name: Dimana Krastevitch-Rangelov
- Country (sports): Bulgaria
- Born: 26 March 1982 (age 43); Sofia, Bulgaria
- Plays: Left-handed (two-handed backhand)
- Prize money: US$ 61,908

Singles
- Career record: 132–172
- Career titles: 0 WTA, 0 ITF
- Highest ranking: No. 222 (3 November 2003)

Doubles
- Career record: 49–73
- Career titles: 0 WTA, 1 ITF
- Highest ranking: No. 179 (21 June 2004)

Team competitions
- Fed Cup: 1–4 (singles 1–2; doubles 0-2)

Dimana Krastevitch-Rangelov (Bulgarian: Димана Кръстевич-Рангелов) (born 26 March 1982) is a retired tennis player from Bulgaria.

== Biography ==
A left-handed player from Sofia, Krastevitch began her career on the ITF Circuit in the 1997 season.

She reached her best singles ranking of 222 in the world in 2003.

As a doubles player, she was a quarterfinalist at a WTA Tour tournament in Philadelphia in 2003, and in the same year won a $25,000 doubles event in Lenzerheide, Switzerland.

In 2006, Krastevitch appeared in three Fed Cup ties for Bulgaria, against Hungary, Great Britain, and Ukraine.

Retiring in 2007, she now lives in the US state of Florida.

== ITF Circuit finals ==
=== Singles: 3 (3 runner–ups) ===
Legend $100,000 tournaments $75,000 tournaments $50,000 tournaments $25,000 tournaments $10,000 tournaments	Finals by surface Hard (0–0) Clay (0–3) Grass (0–0) Carpet (0–0)

Result	W–L	Date	Tournament	Tier	Surface	Opponent	Score
Loss	0–1	Oct 2000	ITF Sofia, Bulgaria	10,000	Clay	(Ukraine) Natalia Bogdanova	2–4, 1–4, 0–4
Loss	0–2	Aug 2002	ITF Enschede, Netherlands	10,000	Clay	(Austria) Daniela Kix	2–6, 5–7
Loss	0–3	Aug 2002	ITF Alphen aan den Rijn, Netherlands	10,000	Clay	(Belgium) Leslie Butkiewicz	1–6, 6–2, 2–6

=== Doubles: 4 (1 title, 3 runner–ups) ===
Legend $100,000 tournaments $75,000 tournaments $50,000 tournaments $25,000 tournaments $10,000 tournaments	Finals by surface Hard (0–1) Clay (1–2) Grass (0–0) Carpet (0–0)

Result	W–L	Date	Tournament	Tier	Surface	Partner	Opponents	Score
Loss	0–1	Jun 1998	ITF Burgas, Bulgaria	10,000	Clay	(Bulgaria) Filipa Gabrovska	(Bulgaria) Kalina Diankova (Italy) Antonella Pozzi	6–1, 4–6, 2–6
Loss	0–2	Aug 2002	ITF Enschede, Netherlands	10,000	Clay	(France) Aurélie Védy	(Austria) Daniela Kix (Germany) Annette Kolb	1–6, 5–7
Win	1–2	Jun 2003	ITF Lenzerheide, Switzerland	25,000	Clay	(Ukraine) Mariya Koryttseva	(Germany) Claudia Kuleszka (Lithuania) Lina Stančiūtė	6–3, 6–2
Loss	1–3	Nov 2003	ITF Puebla, Mexico	25,000	Hard	(United States) Tiffany Dabek	(United States) Stephanie Hazlett (United States) Kaysie Smashey	1–6, 5–7
