= Maria Penkova =

Bulgarian tennis player

Maria Penkova Мария Пенкова
- Country (sports): Bulgaria
- Residence: Sofia, Bulgaria
- Born: 25 June 1984 (age 40); Sofia, People's Republic of Bulgaria
- Turned pro: 1999
- Retired: 2006
- Prize money: $27,706

Singles
- Career record: 105–87
- Career titles: 2 ITF
- Highest ranking: No. 412 (2 October 2006)

Doubles
- Career record: 22–36
- Career titles: 0
- Highest ranking: No. 488 (20 September 2004)

Team competitions
- Fed Cup: 3–6 (doubles 2-6)

Maria Vladimirova Penkova (Bulgarian: Мария Владимирова Пенкова, born 25 June 1984) is a retired tennis player from Bulgaria.

== Career ==
In her career, Penkova won two singles titles on the ITF Women's Circuit. She is a former member of the Bulgaria Fed Cup team.

In 2005, Penkova won a European club championship in Rennes, France as a member of the Cherno More Elite team (Bulgarian: Черно море Елит). Her teammates were Virginiya Trifonova, Sesil Karatantcheva and Tsvetana Pironkova.

== ITF Circuit finals ==
=== Singles: 4 (2 titles, 2 runner–ups) ===
Legend $100,000 tournaments $75,000 tournaments $50,000 tournaments $25,000 tournaments $10,000 tournaments	Finals by surface Hard (0–0) Clay (2–2) Grass (0–0) Carpet (0–0)

Result	W–L	Date	Tournament	Tier	Surface	Opponent	Score
Loss	0–1	Mar 2005	ITF Rome, Italy	10,000	Clay	(France) Aravane Rezaï	2–6, 3–6
Loss	0–2	Sep 2005	ITF Bucharest, Romania	10,000	Clay	(Romania) Corina-Claudia Corduneanu	2–6, 3–6
Win	1–2	Jun 2006	ITF Ruse, Bulgaria	10,000	Clay	(Bulgaria) Dia Evtimova	5–7, 6–4, 6–1
Win	2–2	Jul 2006	ITF Prokuplje, Serbia & Montenegro	10,000	Clay	(Hungary) Milijana Adanko	6–4, 4–6, 6–4

=== Doubles: 1 (runner–up) ===
Result	W–L	Date	Tournament	Tier	Surface	Partner	Opponents	Score
Loss	0–1	Apr 2004	ITF Makarska, Croatia	10,000	Clay	(Italy) Lisa Tognetti	(Slovakia) Martina Babáková (Czech Republic) Iveta Gerlová	1–6, 4–6
