= Radoslava Topalova =

Bulgarian tennis player

- Country (sports): Bulgaria
- Born: 1 September 1980 (age 44); Plovdiv, Bulgaria
- Prize money: $8,765

Singles
- Career record: 33–32
- Career titles: 0
- Highest ranking: No. 590 (21 August 2000)

Doubles
- Career record: 29–21
- Career titles: 3 ITF
- Highest ranking: No. 510 (25 September 2000)

Team competitions
- Fed Cup: 1–2 (all doubles)

Radoslava Topalova (born 1 September 1980) is a former professional tennis player from Bulgaria.

Topalova played doubles in three Fed Cup ties for Bulgaria, one in 2001 and two in 2002.

She is the younger sister of tennis player Desislava Topalova.

== ITF Circuit finals ==
=== Doubles: 4 (3 titles, 1 runner–up) ===
| Legend $100,000 tournaments $75,000 tournaments $50,000 tournaments $25,000 tournaments $10,000 tournaments | Finals by surface Hard (0–0) Clay (2–1) Grass (0–0) Carpet (1–0) |

| Result | W–L | Date | Tournament | Tier | Surface | Partner | Opponents | Score |
|---|---|---|---|---|---|---|---|---|
| Loss | 0–1 | Jul 1998 | ITF Skopje, Macedonia | 10,000 | Clay | (Bulgaria) Filipa Gabrovska | (Bulgaria) Teodora Nedeva (Bulgaria) Antoaneta Pandjerova | 3–6, 0–6 |
| Win | 1–1 | Oct 1999 | ITF Sofia, Bulgaria | 10,000 | Clay | (Bulgaria) Filipa Gabrovska | (Romania) Ramona But (Federal Republic of Yugoslavia) Ljiljana Nanušević | 6–2, 6–0 |
| Win | 2–1 | Aug 2001 | ITF Volos, Greece | 10,000 | Carpet | (Bulgaria) Virginia Trifonova | (Greece) Asimina Kaplani (Greece) Maria Pavlidou | 6–2, 4–6, 7–5 |
| Win | 3–1 | Aug 2002 | ITF Bucharest, Romania | 10,000 | Clay | (Bulgaria) Virginia Trifonova | (Romania) Gabriela Niculescu (Romania) Monica Niculescu | 6–4, 3–6, 6–3 |
