= Maria Geznenge =

Bulgarian tennis player

- Country (sports): Bulgaria; Germany
- Born: 13 March 1977 (age 48); Sofia, Bulgaria
- Turned pro: 1993
- Retired: 2006
- Prize money: US$132,201

Singles
- Career record: 240–265
- Career titles: 0 WTA, 1 ITF
- Highest ranking: No. 190 (9 September 2002)

Grand Slam singles results
- Australian Open: Q1 (2002, 2003)
- French Open: Q1 (2003)
- Wimbledon: Q1 (2002, 2003)
- US Open: 1R (2002)

Doubles
- Career record: 110–175
- Career titles: 2 ITF
- Highest ranking: No. 163 (15 September 2003)

Team competitions
- Fed Cup: 5–2

Maria Geznenge (Bulgarian: Мария Гезненге) (née Gusheva (Bulgarian: Гушева); born 13 March 1977) is a Bulgarian former tennis player.

In her career, she won one singles title and two doubles titles on the ITF Women's Circuit. On 9 September 2002, she reached her best singles ranking of world No. 190. On 15 September 2003, she peaked at No. 163 in the doubles rankings.

Playing for Bulgaria in Fed Cup competitions, Geznenge has a win–loss record of 5–2 (all doubles).

Geznenge retired from the professional tour in 2006.

== ITF Circuit finals ==
=== Singles: 4 (1 title, 3 runner–ups) ===
Legend $25,000 tournaments $10,000 tournaments	Finals by surface Hard (0–1) Clay (1–2)

Result	W–L	Date	Tournament	Tier	Surface	Opponent	Score
Loss	0–1	Apr 1998	ITF Pontevedra, Spain	10,000	Hard	(Spain) Paula Hermida	1–6, 2–6
Win	1–1	May 1998	ITF Sofia, Bulgaria	10,000	Clay	(Czech Republic) Olga Vymetálková	4–6, 6–2, 6–1
Loss	1–2	Mar 2001	ITF Rome, Italy	10,000	Clay	(Russia) Dinara Safina	5–7, 0–6
Loss	1–3	Aug 2006	ITF Wahlstedt, Germany	10,000	Clay	(Germany) Julia Görges	3–6, 2–6

=== Doubles: 10 (2 titles, 8 runner–ups) ===
Legend $75,000 tournaments $50,000 tournaments $25,000 tournaments $10,000 tournaments	Finals by surface Hard (2–4) Clay (0–4)

Result	W–L	Date	Tournament	Tier	Surface	Partner	Opponents	Score
Loss	0–1	Oct 1999	ITF Thessaloniki, Greece	10,000	Hard	(United Kingdom) Louise Latimer	(Czech Republic) Jindra Gabrisova (North Macedonia) Ivona Mihailova	4–6, 2–6
Loss	0–2	Feb 2000	ITF Faro, Portugal	10,000	Hard	(Bulgaria) Antoaneta Pandjerova	(Netherlands) Natasha Galouza (New Zealand) Shelley Stephens	6–7^{(5–7)}, 3–6
Win	1–2	Oct 2000	Open de Touraine, France	25,000	Hard (i)	(Greece) Eleni Daniilidou	(Germany) Mia Buric (Italy) Laura Dell'Angelo	5–3, 4–1, 4–0
Loss	1–3	Feb 2001	ITF Tipton, UK	10,000	Hard (i)	(Greece) Eleni Daniilidou	(United Kingdom) Helen Crook (United Kingdom) Victoria Davies	6–2, 4–6, 4–6
Loss	1–4	Feb 2002	Midland Tennis Classic, United States	75,000	Hard (i)	(Czech Republic) Michaela Paštiková	(Chinese Taipei) Janet Lee (Ukraine) Elena Tatarkova	1–6, 3–6
Loss	1–5	Nov 2002	ITF Deauville, France	25,000	Clay (i)	(Bulgaria) Antoaneta Pandjerova	(Czech Republic) Zuzana Černá (Czech Republic) Zuzana Hejdová	4–6, 5–7
Loss	1–6	Jun 2003	ITF Fontanafredda, Italy	25,000	Clay	(Serbia and Montenegro) Dragana Zarić	(China) Li Ting (China) Sun Tiantian	4–6, 3–6
Loss	1–7	Jul 2003	ITF Stuttgart-Vaihingen, Germany	25,000	Clay	(Serbia and Montenegro) Dragana Zarić	(Germany) Antonia Matic (Germany) Angelika Rösch	1–6, 6–7^{(2–7)}
Loss	1–8	Nov 2003	ITF Deauville, France	25,000	Clay (i)	(Czech Republic) Zuzana Hejdová	(France) Pauline Parmentier (France) Aurélie Védy	7–5, 2–6, 1–6
Win	2–8	Aug 2005	ITF Helsinki, Finland	25,000	Hard	(Austria) Stefanie Haidner	(Finland) Emma Laine (Finland) Essi Laine	7–5, 2–6, 6–4
