= Filipa Gabrovska =

Bulgarian tennis player

- Country (sports): Bulgaria
- Born: 26 March 1982 (age 42); Varna, Bulgaria
- Prize money: US$ 5,899

Singles
- Career record: 24–22
- Career titles: 0 WTA, 0 ITF
- Highest ranking: No. 588 (31 January 2000)

Doubles
- Career record: 24–17
- Career titles: 0 WTA, 2 ITF
- Highest ranking: No. 493 (2 October 2000)

Team competitions
- Fed Cup: 2–4 (doubles 2–4)

Filipa Gabrovska (born 26 March 1982) is a former professional tennis player from Bulgaria.

Born in Varna, Gabrovska played in six Fed Cup ties for Bulgaria between 1998 and 2002.

Gabrovska is now based in the Austrian capital Vienna, where she coaches tennis.

== ITF Circuit finals ==
=== Doubles: 4 (2 titles, 2 runner–ups) ===
| Legend $100,000 tournaments $75,000 tournaments $50,000 tournaments $25,000 tournaments $10,000 tournaments | Finals by surface Hard (0–1) Clay (2–1) Grass (0–0) Carpet (0–0) |

| Result | W–L | Date | Tournament | Tier | Surface | Partner | Opponents | Score |
|---|---|---|---|---|---|---|---|---|
| Loss | 0–1 | Jun 1998 | ITF Bourgas, Bulgaria | 10,000 | Hard | (Bulgaria) Dimana Krastevitch | (Bulgaria) Kalina Diankova (Italy) Antonella Pozzi | 6–1, 4–6, 2–6 |
| Loss | 0–2 | Jul 1998 | ITF Skopje, Macedonia | 10,000 | Clay | (Bulgaria) Radoslava Topalova | (Bulgaria) Teodora Nedeva (Bulgaria) Antoaneta Pandjerova | 3–6, 0–6 |
| Win | 1–2 | Oct 1999 | ITF Sofia, Bulgaria | 10,000 | Clay | (Bulgaria) Radoslava Topalova | (Romania) Ramona But (Federal Republic of Yugoslavia) Ljiljana Nanušević | 6–2, 6–0 |
| Win | 2–2 | Oct 2000 | ITF Sofia, Bulgaria | 10,000 | Clay | (Bulgaria) Neda Mihneva | (Bulgaria) Denitsa Alexandrova (Bulgaria) Virginia Trifonova | 4–1, 2–4, 4–1, 0–4, 4–2 |
