= Antoaneta Pandjerova =

Bulgarian tennis player (born 1977)

Antoaneta Pandjerova Антоанета Панджерова
- Country (sports): Bulgaria
- Born: 22 June 1977 (age 48) Plovdiv, People's Republic of Bulgaria
- Height: 177 cm (5 ft 10 in)
- Turned pro: 1993
- Retired: 2004
- Plays: Right-handed (two-handed backhand)
- Prize money: $98,547

Singles
- Career record: 210–162
- Career titles: 5 ITF
- Highest ranking: No. 174 (25 September 2000)

Grand Slam singles results
- Australian Open: Q1 (2001)
- French Open: Q1 (2001)
- Wimbledon: Q1 (2001)
- US Open: Q1 (2000, 2001)

Doubles
- Career record: 152–99
- Career titles: 17 ITF
- Highest ranking: No. 177 (31 October 1994)

Antoaneta Pandjerova (Bulgarian: Антоанета Панджерова, born 22 June 1977) is a retired tennis player from Bulgaria.

On 25 September 2000, she reached her highest WTA singles ranking of 174 whilst her best doubles ranking was 177 on 31 October 1994.

In her career, she won five singles titles and 17 doubles tournaments on the ITF Women's Circuit.

Playing for the Bulgaria Fed Cup team, Pandjerova has accumulated a win–loss record of 8–13 (singles 3–8; doubles 5–5).

== ITF Circuit finals ==
=== Singles: 10 (5 titles, 5 runner–ups) ===
Legend $100,000 tournaments $75,000 tournaments $50,000 tournaments $25,000 tournaments $10,000 tournaments	Finals by surface Hard (2–0) Clay (3–5) Grass (0–0) Carpet (0–0)

Result	W–L	Date	Tournament	Tier	Surface	Opponent	Score
Loss	0–1	Sep 1993	ITF Varna, Bulgaria	10,000	Clay	(Federal Republic of Yugoslavia) Tatjana Ječmenica	2–6, 6–3, 2–6
Loss	0–2	Nov 1995	ITF Nicosia, Cyprus	10,000	Clay	(Federal Republic of Yugoslavia) Dragana Zarić	2–6, 3–6
Win	1–2	Oct 1997	ITF Thessaloniki, Greece	10,000	Hard	(Romania) Alice Pirsu	6–2, 6–2
Loss	1–3	May 1998	ITF Novi Sad, Yugoslavia	10,000	Clay	(Hungary) Petra Mandula	6–0, 5–7, 1–6
Win	2–3	Oct 1998	ITF Orestiada, Greece	10,000	Hard	(Austria) Julia Adlbrecht	2–6, 6–3, 6–4
Win	3–3	May 1999	ITF Verona, Italy	10,000	Clay	(Switzerland) Laura Bao	5–7, 7–5, 7–5
Win	4–3	Apr 2000	ITF Maglie, Italy	25,000	Clay	(Hungary) Petra Mandula	6–4, 2–6, 7–5
Loss	4–4	Sep 2000	ITF Bucharest, Romania	25,000	Clay	(Hungary) Zsófia Gubacsi	3–6, 4–6
Win	5–4	Sep 2000	ITF Sofia, Bulgaria	25,000	Clay	(Austria) Evelyn Fauth	7–5, 6–4
Loss	5–5	Jun 2003	ITF Stare Splavy, Czech Republic	10,000	Clay	(Slovakia) Dominika Nociarová	2–6, 3–6

=== Doubles: 27 (17 titles, 10 runner–ups) ===
Legend $100,000 tournaments $75,000 tournaments $50,000 tournaments $25,000 tournaments $10,000 tournaments	Finals by surface Hard (4–2) Clay (13–8) Grass (0–0) Carpet (0–0)

Result	W–L	Date	Tournament	Tier	Surface	Partner	Opponents	Score
Loss	0–1	May 1993	ITF Bytom, Poland	10,000	Clay	(Bulgaria) Teodora Nedeva	(Ukraine) Natalia Biletskaya (Ukraine) Elena Tatarkova	w/o
Win	1–1	Jun 1993	ITF Plovdiv, Bulgaria	10,000	Clay	(Bulgaria) Tzvetelina Nikolova	(Bulgaria) Galia Angelova (Bulgaria) Teodora Nedeva	6–3, 6–3
Win	2–1	Feb 1994	ITF Faro, Portugal	10,000	Hard	(Bulgaria) Teodora Nedeva	(Japan) Keiko Ishida (Japan) Yoriko Yamagishi	6–1, 6–3
Win	3–1	Feb 1994	ITF Amadora, Portugal	10,000	Hard	(Bulgaria) Teodora Nedeva	(Russia) Alina Jidkova (Russia) Anna Linkova	6–3, 6–1
Loss	3–2	Apr 1994	ITF Supetar, Croatia	10,000	Clay	(Bulgaria) Teodora Nedeva	(Argentina) María Fernanda Landa (Argentina) Laura Montalvo	4–6, 2–6
Win	4–2	Apr 1994	ITF Bol, Croatia	10,000	Clay	(Bulgaria) Teodora Nedeva	(Czech Republic) Martina Hautová (Czech Republic) Blanka Kumbárová	6–3, 7–5
Win	5–2	Aug 1994	ITF Plovdiv, Bulgaria	10,000	Clay	(Bulgaria) Teodora Nedeva	(Bulgaria) Dora Djilianova (Bulgaria) Desislava Topalova	6–4, 4–6, 6–2
Win	6–2	Oct 1994	ITF Burgas, Bulgaria	10,000	Clay	(Bulgaria) Teodora Nedeva	(Slovakia) Patrícia Marková (Netherlands) Henriëtte van Aalderen	2–6, 6–4, 6–0
Win	7–2	Apr 1995	ITF Plovdiv, Bulgaria	25,000	Clay	(Bulgaria) Teodora Nedeva	(Moldova) Svetlana Komleva (Ukraine) Irina Sukhova	7–5, 6–1
Loss	7–3	Jun 1995	ITF Novi Sad, Yugoslavia	25,000	Clay	(Federal Republic of Yugoslavia) Tatjana Ječmenica	(Argentina) Laura Montalvo (Paraguay) Larissa Schaerer	7–5, 1–6, 1–6
Win	8–3	Nov 1995	ITF Cairo, Egypt	10,000	Clay	(Bulgaria) Teodora Nedeva	(Israel) Limor Gabai (Israel) Hila Rosen	3–6, 6–1, 7–6^{(8)}
Win	9–3	Nov 1995	ITF Cairo, Egypt	10,000	Clay	(Bulgaria) Teodora Nedeva	(France) Kildine Chevalier (Ukraine) Tessa Shapovalova	5–7, 6–3, 6–0
Win	10–3	Jun 1996	ITF Skopje, Macedonia	10,000	Clay	(Bulgaria) Galina Dimitrova	(North Macedonia) Marina Lazarovska (Federal Republic of Yugoslavia) Katarina Mišić	6–4, 6–0
Win	11–3	Sep 1996	ITF Albena, Bulgaria	10,000	Clay	(Bulgaria) Pavlina Nola	(Bulgaria) Galina Dimitrova (Bulgaria) Desislava Topalova	6–4, 6–2
Loss	11–4	Sep 1996	ITF Sofia, Bulgaria	25,000	Clay	(Bulgaria) Teodora Nedeva	(Argentina) Laura Montalvo (Czech Republic) Lenka Němečková	2–6, 0–6
Loss	11–5	Sep 1997	ITF Albena, Bulgaria	10,000	Clay	(Bulgaria) Lubomira Bacheva	(Bulgaria) Galina Dimitrova (Bulgaria) Desislava Topalova	5–7, 1–6
Loss	11–6	Apr 1998	ITF Hvar, Croatia	10,000	Clay	(Czech Republic) Helena Vildová	(Croatia) Jelena Kostanić Tošić (Slovenia) Katarina Srebotnik	5–7, 3–6
Loss	11–7	May 1998	ITF Novi Sad, Yugoslavia	10,000	Clay	(Bulgaria) Desislava Topalova	(Federal Republic of Yugoslavia) Tatjana Ječmenica (Federal Republic of Yugoslavia) Dragana Zarić	2–6, 5–7
Win	12–7	Jul 1997	ITF Skopje, Macedonia	10,000	Clay	(Bulgaria) Teodora Nedeva	(Bulgaria) Filipa Gabrovska (Bulgaria) Radoslava Topalova	6–3, 6–0
Loss	12–8	Oct 1998	ITF Orestiada, Greece	10,000	Hard	(Romania) Mira Lorelei Radu	(Austria) Julia Adlbrecht (North Macedonia) Marina Lazarovska	0–6, 4–6
Loss	12–9	Feb 2000	ITF Faro, Portugal	10,000	Hard	(Bulgaria) Maria Geznenge	(Netherlands) Natasha Galouza (New Zealand) Shelley Stephens	6–7^{(5)}, 3–6
Win	13–9	Apr 2000	ITF Quartu Sant'Elena, Italy	10,000	Clay	(Bulgaria) Svetlana Krivencheva	(Czech Republic) Michaela Paštiková (Czech Republic) Helena Vildová	7–5, 7–6^{(9)}
Win	14–9	Sep 2000	ITF Bucharest, Romania	25,000	Clay	(Bulgaria) Desislava Topalova	(Federal Republic of Yugoslavia) Katarina Mišić (Germany) Marketa Kochta	6–4, 6–2
Win	15–9	Sep 2000	ITF Sofia, Bulgaria	25,000	Clay	(Bulgaria) Desislava Topalova	(Netherlands) Natalia Galouza (New Zealand) Shelley Stephens	6–1, 7–6^{(4)}
Win	16–9	Sep 2002	Batumi Ladies Open, Georgia	75,000	Hard	(Bulgaria) Desislava Topalova	(Russia) Gulnara Fattakhetdinova (Russia) Maria Kondratieva	2–6, 6–1, 6–1
Win	17–9	Oct 2000	Open de Saint-Raphaël, France	25,000	Hard (i)	(Bulgaria) Desislava Topalova	(Federal Republic of Yugoslavia) Katarina Mišić (Federal Republic of Yugoslavia) Dragana Zarić	4–6, 6–3, 6–1
Loss	17–10	Nov 2002	ITF Deauville, France	25,000	Clay (i)	(Bulgaria) Maria Geznenge	(Czech Republic) Zuzana Černá (Czech Republic) Zuzana Hejdová	4–6, 5–7
