= Desislava Topalova =

Bulgarian tennis player

Desislava Topalova Десислава Топалова
- Country (sports): Bulgaria
- Born: 8 June 1978 (age 47) Plovdiv, Bulgaria
- Turned pro: 1996
- Retired: 2005
- Prize money: US$ 150,485

Singles
- Career record: 240–190
- Career titles: 7 ITF
- Highest ranking: No. 152 (15 May 2000)

Grand Slam singles results
- Australian Open: Q2 (2001)
- French Open: Q2 (2000, 2001, 2002)
- Wimbledon: Q1 (2000, 2001, 2002)
- US Open: Q3 (2004)

Doubles
- Career record: 120–92
- Career titles: 9 ITF
- Highest ranking: No. 184 (10 September 2001)

Team competitions
- Fed Cup: 18–16 (singles 14–7)

Desislava Topalova (also transliterated as Dessislava Topalova, Bulgarian: Десислава Топалова; born 8 June 1978) is a retired tennis player from Bulgaria.

During her career she won 7 ITF singles titles and reached her career-high singles ranking of world No. 152 on 15 May 2000, whilst her best doubles ranking was No. 184 on 10 September 2001. Topalova was a member of the Bulgaria Fed Cup team between 1997 and the mid 2000s, serving as its captain in the later stages of her career.

== ITF Circuit finals ==
=== Singles: 12 (7 titles, 5 runner–ups) ===
Legend $100,000 tournaments $75,000 tournaments $50,000 tournaments $25,000 tournaments $10,000 tournaments	Finals by surface Hard (1–2) Clay (6–3) Grass (0–0) Carpet (0–0)

Result	W–L	Date	Tournament	Tier	Surface	Opponent	Score
Win	1–0	Aug 1996	ITF Istanbul, Turkey	10,000	Hard	(Germany) Tanja Karsten	7–6^{(7–1)}, 6–7^{(3–7)}, 6–1
Loss	1–1	Aug 1997	ITF Istanbul, Turkey	10,000	Hard	(Russia) Elena Dementieva	5–7, 4–6
Win	2–1	Sep 1997	ITF Cluj, Romania	10,000	Clay	(Romania) Alice Pirsu	6–3, 5–7, 6–3
Win	3–1	Sep 1997	ITF Albena, Bulgaria	10,000	Clay	(Bulgaria) Lubomira Bacheva	2–6, 6–4, 6–0
Win	4–1	Jul 1998	ITF Alkmaar, Netherlands	10,000	Clay	(Netherlands) Yvette Basting	7–6^{(7–3)}, 6–2
Win	5–1	Sep 1998	ITF Sofia, Bulgaria	25,000	Clay	(Belarus) Nadejda Ostrovskaya	6–4, 4–6, 6–2
Loss	5–2	Apr 1999	ITF Makarska, Croatia	10,000	Clay	(Hungary) Petra Mandula	5–7, 5–7
Win	6–2	Oct 1999	ITF Porto, Portugal	25,000	Clay	(Poland) Anna Bieleń-Żarska	7–6^{(8–6)}, 4–6, 7–5
Win	7–2	Apr 2000	ITF Prostějov, Czech Republic	25,000	Clay	(Belgium) Daphne van de Zande	6–4, 6–1
Loss	7–3	Sep 2002	ITF Sofia, Bulgaria	25,000	Clay	(Georgia (country)) Margalita Chakhnashvili	3–6, 6–4, 0–6
Loss	7–4	Aug 2003	ITF Bielefeld, Germany	10,000	Clay	(Germany) Christina Fitz	6–3, 3–6, 3–6
Loss	7–5	Oct 2003	ITF Rockhampton, Australia	25,000	Hard	(Germany) Nina Dübbers	5–7, 1–6

=== Doubles: 17 (9 titles, 8 runner–ups) ===
Legend $100,000 tournaments $75,000 tournaments $50,000 tournaments $25,000 tournaments $10,000 tournaments	Finals by surface Hard (4–1) Clay (5–7) Grass (0–0) Carpet (0–0)

Result	W–L	Date	Tournament	Tier	Surface	Partner	Opponents	Score
Loss	0–1	Aug 1994	ITF Plovdiv, Bulgaria	10,000	Clay	(Bulgaria) Dora Djilianova	(Bulgaria) Teodora Nedeva (Bulgaria) Antoaneta Pandjerova	4–6, 6–4, 2–6
Win	1–1	Sep 1994	ITF Varna, Bulgaria	10,000	Hard	(Bulgaria) Dora Djilianova	(Bulgaria) Galina Dimitrova (Germany) Claudia Timm	6–3, 7–5
Loss	1–2	Feb 1995	ITF Istanbul, Turkey	10,000	Hard	(Bulgaria) Dora Djilianova	(United States) Corina Morariu (Greece) Christina Zachariadou	3–6, 5–7
Loss	1–3	Jun 1995	ITF Katowice, Poland	10,000	Clay	(Bulgaria) Galina Dimitrova	(Czech Republic) Monika Kratochvílová (Czech Republic) Hana Šromová	3–6, 6–4, 3–6
Loss	1–4	Sep 1995	ITF Varna, Bulgaria	10,000	Clay	(Bulgaria) Galina Dimitrova	(Bulgaria) Dora Djilianova (Bulgaria) Pavlina Nola	6–4, 4–6, 5–7
Win	2–4	Aug 1996	ITF Istanbul, Turkey	10,000	Hard	(Turkey) İpek Şenoğlu	(Malaysia) Khoo Chin-bee (Romania) Alice Pirsu	6–1, 6–4
Loss	2–5	Sep 1996	ITF Albena, Bulgaria	10,000	Clay	(Bulgaria) Galina Dimitrova	(Bulgaria) Antoaneta Pandjerova (Bulgaria) Pavlina Nola	4–6, 2–6
Win	3–5	Jun 1997	ITF Velp, Netherlands	10,000	Clay	(Bulgaria) Galina Dimitrova	(Netherlands) Kim Kilsdonk (Netherlands) Jolanda Mens	5–7, 7–5, 6–4
Win	4–5	Sep 1997	ITF Albena, Bulgaria	10,000	Clay	(Bulgaria) Galina Dimitrova	(Bulgaria) Lubomira Bacheva (Bulgaria) Antoaneta Pandjerova	7–5, 6–1
Loss	4–6	May 1998	ITF Sofia, Bulgaria	10,000	Clay	(Bulgaria) Teodora Nedeva	(Czech Republic) Olga Vymetálková (Czech Republic) Michaela Paštiková	5–7, 6–7^{(5–7)}
Loss	4–7	May 1998	ITF Novi Sad, Yugoslavia	10,000	Clay	(Bulgaria) Antoaneta Pandjerova	(Federal Republic of Yugoslavia) Tatjana Ječmenica (Federal Republic of Yugoslavia) Dragana Zarić	2–6, 5–7
Loss	4–8	Aug 1998	ITF Paderborn, Germany	10,000	Clay	(Germany) Esther Brunn	(Czech Republic) Linda Faltynková (Czech Republic) Petra Raclavská	3–6, 2–6
Win	5–8	Sep 2000	ITF Bucharest, Romania	25,000	Clay	(Bulgaria) Antoaneta Pandjerova	(Federal Republic of Yugoslavia) Katarina Mišić (Germany) Marketa Kochta	6–4, 6–2
Win	6–8	Sep 2000	ITF Sofia, Bulgaria	25,000	Clay	(Bulgaria) Antoaneta Pandjerova	(Netherlands) Natalia Galouza (New Zealand) Shelley Stephens	6–1, 7–6^{(7–4)}
Win	7–8	Sep 2002	ITF Batumi, Georgia	75,000	Hard	(Bulgaria) Antoaneta Pandjerova	(Russia) Gulnara Fattakhetdinova (Russia) Maria Kondratieva	2–6, 6–1, 6–1
Win	8–8	Oct 2000	ITF Saint-Raphaël, France	25,000	Hard (i)	(Bulgaria) Antoaneta Pandjerova	(Federal Republic of Yugoslavia) Katarina Mišić (Federal Republic of Yugoslavia) Dragana Zarić	4–6, 6–3, 6–1
Loss	8–9	Sep 2003	ITF Sofia, Bulgaria	25,000	Clay	(Serbia and Montenegro) Dragana Zarić	(Austria) Daniela Klemenschits (Austria) Sandra Klemenschits	6–3, 7–5
