= 1999 Fed Cup Europe/Africa Zone Group II – Pool C =

International tennis competition

Group C of the 1999 Fed Cup Europe/Africa Zone Group II was one of four pools in the Europe/Africa zone of the 1999 Fed Cup. Five teams competed in a round robin competition, with the top team advancing to Group I for 2000.

	(Morocco) MAR	(Estonia) EST	(Lithuania) LTU	(Cyprus) CYP	(Kenya) KEN	Match; W–L	Set; W–L	Game; W–L	Standings
Morocco		2–1	3–0	3–0	3–0	4–0	22–4	155–84	1
Estonia	1–2		3–0	3–0	3–0	3–1	22–4	146–70	2
Lithuania	0–3	0–3		3–0	3–0	2–2	12–12	117–93	3
Cyprus	0–3	0–3	0–3		3–0	1–3	6–18	69–124	4
Kenya	0–3	0–3	0–3	0–3		0–4	0–24	30–146	5

== Morocco vs. Lithuania ==
Morocco
3
La Manga Club, Murcia, Spain
26 April 1999
Red clay (outdoors)

Lithuania
0

			1	2	3
1	(Morocco) (Lithuania)	Habiba Ifrakh; Ilona Jarkova	6; 4	4; 6	6; 4
2	(Morocco) (Lithuania)	Bahia Mouhtassine; Galina Misiuriova	6; 4	6; 3
3	(Morocco) (Lithuania)	Meryem El Haddad / Bahia Mouhtassine; Edita Liachovičiūtė / Galina Misiuriova	1; 6	6; 2	6; 3

== Estonia vs. Cyprus ==
Estonia
3
La Manga Club, Murcia, Spain
26 April 1999
Red clay (outdoors)

Cyprus
0

			1	2	3
1	(Estonia) (Cyprus)	Margit Rüütel; Joanna Rossi	6; 0	6; 1
2	(Estonia) (Cyprus)	Ilona Poljakova; Stephanie Kamberi	6; 1	6; 0
3	(Estonia) (Cyprus)	Maret Ani / Liina Suurvarik; Eleni Pilava Papanikolaou / Chrystalla Tritti	6; 3	7; 5

== Estonia vs. Lithuania ==
Estonia
3
La Manga Club, Murcia, Spain
27 April 1999
Red clay (outdoors)

Lithuania
0

			1	2	3
1	(Estonia) (Lithuania)	Maret Ani; Edita Liachovičiūtė	7^{7} 6^{1}	6; 0
2	(Estonia) (Lithuania)	Ilona Poljakova; Galina Misiuriova	6; 0	6; 2
3	(Estonia) (Lithuania)	Maret Ani / Liina Suurvarik; Edita Liachovičiūtė / Galina Misiuriova	7; 5	6; 0

== Cyprus vs. Kenya ==
Cyprus
3
La Manga Club, Murcia, Spain
27 April 1999
Red clay (outdoors)

Kenya
0

			1	2	3
1	(Cyprus) (Kenya)	Eleni Pilava Papanikolaou; Shaila Ali	6; 2	6; 0
2	(Cyprus) (Kenya)	Stephanie Kamberi; Naheeda Noormohamed	7; 5	6; 0
3	(Cyprus) (Kenya)	Eleni Pilava Papanikolaou / Chrystalla Tritti; Florence Mbugua / Evelyn Otula	7^{12} 6^{10}	6; 2

== Morocco vs. Cyprus ==
Morocco
3
La Manga Club, Murcia, Spain
28 April 1999
Red clay (outdoors)

Cyprus
0

			1	2	3
1	(Morocco) (Cyprus)	Meryem El Haddad; Joanna Rossi	6; 1	6; 1
2	(Morocco) (Cyprus)	Bahia Mouhtassine; Stephanie Kamberi	6; 1	6; 4
3	(Morocco) (Cyprus)	Meryem El Haddad / Habiba Ifrakh; Eleni Pilava Papanikolaou / Chrystalla Tritti	6; 4	6; 4

== Estonia vs. Kenya ==
Estonia
3
La Manga Club, Murcia, Spain
28 April 1999
Red clay (outdoors)

Kenya
0

			1	2	3
1	(Estonia) (Kenya)	Margit Rüütel; Shaila Ali	6; 1	6; 1
2	(Estonia) (Kenya)	Liina Suurvarik; Naheeda Noormohamed	6; 2	6; 0
3	(Estonia) (Kenya)	Margit Rüütel / Liina Suurvarik; Florence Mbugua / Evelyn Otula	6; 1	6; 0

== Morocco vs. Kenya ==
Morocco
3
La Manga Club, Murcia, Spain
29 April 1999
Red clay (outdoors)

Kenya
0

			1	2	3
1	(Morocco) (Kenya)	Habiba Ifrakh; Evelyn Otula	6; 0	6; 2
2	(Morocco) (Kenya)	Meryem El Haddad; Florence Mbugua	6; 0	6; 0
3	(Morocco) (Kenya)	Meryem El Haddad / Bahia Mouhtassine; Florence Mbugua / Evelyn Otula	6; 0	6; 0

== Lithuania vs. Cyprus ==
Lithuania
3
La Manga Club, Murcia, Spain
29 April 1999
Red clay (outdoors)

Cyprus
0

			1	2	3
1	(Lithuania) (Cyprus)	Goda Kuliešytė; Eleni Pilava Papanikolaou	6; 1	6; 1
2	(Lithuania) (Cyprus)	Ilona Jarkova; Stephanie Kamberi	6; 1	6; 0
3	(Lithuania) (Cyprus)	Edita Liachovičiūtė / Galina Misiuriova; Stephanie Kamberi / Eleni Pilava Papanikolaou	6; 2	6; 1

== Morocco vs. Estonia ==
Morocco
2
La Manga Club, Murcia, Spain
30 April 1999
Red clay (outdoors)

Estonia
1

			1	2	3
1	(Morocco) (Estonia)	Meryem El Haddad; Maret Ani	4; 6	6^{2} 7^{7}
2	(Morocco) (Estonia)	Bahia Mouhtassine; Ilona Poljakova	6; 4	6^{5} 7^{7}	6; 1
3	(Morocco) (Estonia)	Meryem El Haddad / Bahia Mouhtassine; Maret Ani / Liina Suurvarik	6; 3	2; 6	6; 1

== Lithuania vs. Kenya ==
Lithuania
3
La Manga Club, Murcia, Spain
30 April 1999
Red clay (outdoors)

Kenya
0

			1	2	3
1	(Lithuania) (Kenya)	Goda Kuliešytė; Evelyn Otula	6; 1	6; 3
2	(Lithuania) (Kenya)	Galina Misiuriova; Florence Mbugua	6; 1	6; 2
3	(Lithuania) (Kenya)	Goda Kuliešytė / Edita Liachovičiūtė; Florence Mbugua / Naheeda Noormohamed	6; 0	6; 1

- Morocco placed first in this group and thus advanced to Group I for 2000, where they placed last in their pool of five and was thus relegated back to Group II for 2001.

== See also ==
- Fed Cup structure
