= 1995 Fed Cup Europe/Africa Zone =

Subsection of tennis competition

The Europe/Africa Zone was one of three zones of regional competition in the 1995 Fed Cup.

== Group I ==
- Venue: La Manga Club, Murcia, Spain (outdoor clay)
- Date: 17–21 April

The sixteen teams were divided into four pools of four teams. The top teams of each pool play-off in a two-round knockout stage to decide which nation progresses to World Group II play-offs. Nations finishing in the bottom place in each pool were relegated to Europe/Africa Zone Group II for 1996.

=== Pools ===
	Pool A	SLO	CZE	GBR	POL
1	Slovenia (3–0)		2–1	2–1	2–1
2	Czech Republic (2–1)	1–2		3–0	3–0
3	Great Britain (1–2)	1–2	0–3		2–1
4	Poland (0–3)	1–2	0–3	1–2	

	Pool B	HUN	RUS	GEO	UKR
1	Hungary (2–0)		3–0	w/o	3–0
2	Russia (2–1)	0–3		3–0	2–1
3	Georgia (0–2)	w/o	0–3		1–2
4	Ukraine (1–2)	0–3	1–2	2–1	

	Pool C	BLR	LAT	SUI	FIN
1	Belarus (3–0)		2–1	2–1	2–1
2	Latvia (2–1)	1–2		2–1	2–1
3	Switzerland (1–2)	1–2	1–2		3–0
4	Finland (0–3)	1–2	1–2	0–3	

	Pool D	BEL	ROU	CRO	ISR
1	Belgium (3–0)		2–1	2–1	3–0
2	Romania (2–1)	1–2		2–1	3–0
3	Croatia (1–2)	1–2	1–2		3–0
4	Israel (0–3)	0–3	0–3	0–3	

=== Knockout stage ===
Semifinals
Slovenia	0
Czech Republic	3
Russia	1
Belarus	2
Hungary	2
Latvia	1
Romania	0
Belgium	3

Finals
Czech Republic	3
Belarus	0
Hungary	0
Belgium	3

- Czech Republic and Belgium advanced to World Group II Play-offs.
- Poland, Ukraine, Finland and Israel relegated to Group II in 1996.

== Group II ==
- Venue: Nairobi Club, Nairobi, Kenya (outdoor clay)
- Date: 8–13 May

The twenty teams were divided into four pools of five. The top two teams from each pool then moved on to the play-off stage of the competition. The four teams that won one match from the play-off stage would advance to Group I for 1996.

=== Pools ===
	Pool A	GRE	NOR	MAR	TUN	EGY
1	Greece (4–0)		2–1	3–0	3–0	3–0
2	Norway (3–1)	1–2		3–0	2–1	3–0
3	Morocco (2–2)	0–3	0–3		3–0	3–0
4	Tunisia (1–3)	0–3	1–2	0–3		2–1
5	Egypt (0–4)	0–3	0–3	0–3	1–2	

	Pool B	POR	LUX	ZIM	EST	SEN
1	Portugal (4–0)		2–1	3–0	3–0	3–0
2	Luxembourg (3–1)	1–2		2–1	3–0	3–0
3	Zimbabwe (2–2)	0–3	1–2		3–0	3–0
4	Estonia (1–3)	0–3	0–3	0–3		2–1
5	Senegal (0–4)	0–3	0–3	0–3	1–2	

	Pool C	DEN	MKD	TUR	LTU	BOT
1	Denmark (4–0)		3–0	3–0	3–0	3–0
2	Macedonia (3–1)	0–3		2–1	2–1	3–0
3	Turkey (1–2)	0–3	1–2		1–1	3–0
4	Lithuania (1–2)	0–3	1–2	1–1		3–0
5	Botswana (0–4)	0–3	0–3	0–3	0–3	

	Pool D	IRL	YUG	MLT	KEN	CYP
1	Ireland (4–0)		2–1	3–0	3–0	3–0
2	Yugoslavia (3–1)	1–2		3–0	3–0	3–0
3	Malta (2–2)	0–3	0–3		3–0	3–0
4	Kenya (1–3)	0–3	0–3	0–3		2–1
5	Cyprus (0–4)	0–3	0–3	0–3	1–2	

=== Play-offs ===
Winning team	Score	Losing team
Greece	2–1	Macedonia
Portugal	2–1	Luxembourg
Yugoslavia	2–1	Denmark
Norway	2–1	Ireland

- Greece, Portugal, Yugoslavia and Norway promoted to Europe/Africa Group I in 1996.

== See also ==
- Fed Cup structure
