= 2006 Grand Prix SAR La Princesse Lalla Meryem – Singles =

Singles
- 2006 Grand Prix SAR La Princesse Lalla Meryem

Final
- Champion: (United States) Meghann Shaughnessy
- Runner-up: (Slovakia) Martina Suchá
- Score: 6–2, 3–6, 6–3

Events
| Singles | Doubles |
| ← 2005 · | Grand Prix SAR La Princesse Lalla Meryem | · 2007 → |

Nuria Llagostera Vives was the defending champion, but chose to play at the 2006 Telecom Italia Masters, which was held during the same week.

Meghann Shaughnessy won the title, defeating Martina Suchá 6–2, 3–6, 6–3 in the final.

== Seeds ==
1. (France) Marion Bartoli (first round)
2. (China) Zheng Jie (second round)
3. (France) Émilie Loit (quarterfinals)
4. (China) Li Na (withdrew because of a bilateral great toe blister)
5. (Ukraine) Alona Bondarenko (semifinals)
6. (United States) Ashley Harkleroad (second round)
7. (United States) Jamea Jackson (first round)
8. (Slovakia) Martina Suchá (finals, runner-up)
9. (China) Yan Zi (semifinals)

== Draw ==
=== Key ===
- Q = Qualifier
- WC = Wild card
- LL = Lucky loser
- Alt = Alternate
- SE = Special exempt
- PR = Protected ranking
- ITF = ITF entry
- JE = Junior exempt
- w/o = Walkover
- r = Retired
- d = Defaulted
- SR = Special ranking

=== Finals ===
Semifinals
(United States) Meghann Shaughnessy | 6 | 6
9 | (China) Yan Zi | 0 | 2
5 | (Ukraine) Alona Bondarenko | 3 | 2
8 | (Slovakia) Martina Suchá | 6 | 6

Final
(United States) Meghann Shaughnessy | 6 | 3 | 6
8 | (Slovakia) Martina Suchá | 2 | 6 | 3

=== Section 1 ===
First round
1 | (France) M Bartoli | 6 | 2 | r
(Germany) S Klösel | 3 | 0
(United States) M Shaughnessy | 6 | 2 | 6
(Canada) A Wozniak | 3 | 6 | 4
(Hungary) M Czink | 7 | 3 | 6
(Spain) A Parra Santonja | 6^{3} | 6 | 2
(France) C Pin | 4 | 1
6 | (United States) A Harkleroad | 6 | 6
3 | (France) É Loit | 6 | 6
PR | (Indonesia) A Widjaja | 4 | 3
(Russia) A Rodionova | 2 | 1
(Croatia) I Lisjak | 6 | 6
(Spain) C Martínez Granados | 6^{7} | 4
LL | (Romania) M Gojnea | 7 | 6
WC | (Morocco) B Mouhtassine | 4 | 2
9 | (China) Z Yan | 6 | 6

Second round
(Germany) S Klösel | 5 | 6 | 3
(United States) M Shaughnessy | 7 | 0 | 6
(Hungary) M Czink | 6 | 6
6 | (United States) A Harkleroad | 1 | 4
3 | (France) É Loit | 6 | 6
(Croatia) I Lisjak | 4 | 3
LL | (Romania) M Gojnea | 2 | 4
9 | (China) Z Yan | 6 | 6

Quarterfinals
(United States) M Shaughnessy | 6 | 6
(Hungary) M Czink | 1 | 4
3 | (France) É Loit | 6 | 6^{6} | 6^{4}
9 | (China) Z Yan | 1 | 7 | 7

Semifinals
(United States) M Shaughnessy | 6 | 6
9 | (China) Z Yan | 0 | 2

=== Section 2 ===
First round
7 | (United States) J Jackson | 6 | 1 | 6^{5}
(Czech Republic) H Šromová | 1 | 6 | 7
LL | (Republic of Ireland) K Liggan | 7 | 3 | 0
Q | (Russia) L Skavronskaia | 6^{8} | 6 | 6
(United States) B Mattek | 6 | 6
(Venezuela) M Sequera | 3 | 2
Q | (Romania) IR Olaru | 1 | 3
5 | (Ukraine) A Bondarenko | 6 | 6
8 | (Slovakia) M Suchá | 7 | 6
(United States) V King | 5 | 2
LL | (United States) N Uberoi | 6 | 4 | 6
WC | (Tunisia) S Sfar | 4 | 6 | 4
Q | (Luxembourg) A Kremer | 6 | 7
(Italy) An Serra Zanetti | 4 | 5
Q | (France) Y Fedossova | 0 | 1
2 | (China) J Zheng | 6 | 6

Second round
(Czech Republic) H Šromová | 6 | 6
Q | (Russia) L Skavronskaia | 1 | 0
(United States) B Mattek | 3 | 2
5 | (Ukraine) A Bondarenko | 6 | 6
8 | (Slovakia) M Suchá | 6 | 6
LL | (United States) N Uberoi | 1 | 0
Q | (Luxembourg) A Kremer | 6 | 4 | 6
2 | (China) J Zheng | 4 | 6 | 3

Quarterfinals
(Czech Republic) H Šromová | 2 | 6^{2}
5 | (Ukraine) A Bondarenko | 6 | 7
8 | (Slovakia) M Suchá | 3 | 6 | 6
Q | (Luxembourg) A Kremer | 6 | 1 | 0

Semifinals
5 | (Ukraine) A Bondarenko | 3 | 2
8 | (Slovakia) M Suchá | 6 | 6

== Qualifying ==
=== Seeds ===
1. (Luxembourg) Anne Kremer (qualified)
2. (Russia) Lioudmila Skavronskaia (qualified)
3. (Canada) Stéphanie Dubois (second round)
4. (Luxembourg) Claudine Schaul (second round)
5. (United States) Neha Uberoi (Qualifying competition, lucky loser)
6. (Republic of Ireland) Kelly Liggan (Qualifying competition, lucky loser)
7. (Romania) Mădălina Gojnea (Qualifying competition, lucky loser)
8. (France) Yulia Fedossova (qualified)

=== Qualifiers ===
1. (Luxembourg) Anne Kremer
2. (Russia) Lioudmila Skavronskaia
3. (Romania) Ioana Raluca Olaru
4. (France) Yulia Fedossova

=== Lucky losers ===
1. (Republic of Ireland) Kelly Liggan
2. (United States) Neha Uberoi
3. (Romania) Mădălina Gojnea

=== Qualifying draw ===
==== First qualifier ====
First round
(United States) Aleke Tsoubanos | 6 | 6
WC | (Morocco) Lina Bennani | 1 | 1
(Algeria) Samia Medjahdi | 6 | 6
(United States) Brie Whitehead | 1 | 0

Second round
1 | (Luxembourg) Anne Kremer | 6 | 6
(United States) Aleke Tsoubanos | 0 | 2
(Algeria) Samia Medjahdi | 0 | 4
6 | (Republic of Ireland) Kelly Liggan | 6 | 6

Qualifying competition
1 | (Luxembourg) Anne Kremer | 6 | 7
6 | (Republic of Ireland) Kelly Liggan | 0 | 6^{4}

==== Second qualifier ====
First round
(Canada) Maureen Drake | 6 | 6
(Russia) Svetlana Smirnova | 1 | 3
(Switzerland) Vanessa Wellauer | 6 | 6
WC | (Morocco) Majdouline Akrate | 4 | 3

Second round
2 | (Russia) Lioudmila Skavronskaia | 6 | 4 | 6
(Canada) Maureen Drake | 1 | 6 | 3
(Switzerland) Vanessa Wellauer | 3 | 1
5 | (United States) Neha Uberoi | 6 | 6

Qualifying competition
2 | (Russia) Lioudmila Skavronskaia | 6 | 6
5 | (United States) Neha Uberoi | 4 | 1

==== Third qualifier ====
First round
(Brazil) Suzana Kuffner | 1 | 3
(Romania) Ioana Raluca Olaru | 6 | 6
(France) Émilie Bacquet | 1 | 6 | 6
(Germany) Diana Vrânceanu | 6 | 1 | 2
WC | (Brazil) Aline Pinheiro | 0 | 1
7 | (Romania) Mădălina Gojnea | 6 | 6

Second round
3 | (Canada) Stéphanie Dubois | 1 | 3
(Romania) Ioana Raluca Olaru | 6 | 6
(France) Émilie Bacquet | 0 | 3
7 | (Romania) Mădălina Gojnea | 6 | 6

Qualifying competition
(Romania) Ioana Raluca Olaru | 7 | 6
7 | (Romania) Mădălina Gojnea | 6^{1} | 2

==== Fourth qualifier ====
First round
(Russia) Irina Kotkina | 6 | 6
WC | (Morocco) Rita Bengelloun-Touimy | 3 | 1
WC | (Morocco) Habiba Ifrakh | 5 | 1
WC | (Brazil) Carolina-Magalhaes Malheiros | 7 | 6
(Germany) Laura Bsoul | 2 | 2
8 | (France) Yulia Fedossova | 6 | 6

Second round
4 | (Luxembourg) Claudine Schaul | 1 | 2
(Russia) Irina Kotkina | 6 | 6
WC | (Brazil) Carolina-Magalhaes Malheiros | 3 | 3
8 | (France) Yulia Fedossova | 6 | 6

Qualifying competition
(Russia) Irina Kotkina | 1 | 6 | 4
8 | (France) Yulia Fedossova | 6 | 1 | 6
