= 2005 Grand Prix SAR La Princesse Lalla Meryem – Doubles =

Doubles
- 2005 Grand Prix SAR La Princesse Lalla Meryem

Final
- Champion: (France) Émilie Loit (Czech Republic) Barbora Strýcová
- Runner-up: (Spain) Lourdes Domínguez Lino (Spain) Nuria Llagostera Vives
- Score: 3–6, 7–6(5), 7–5

Events
Singles	Doubles
← 2004 ·	Grand Prix SAR La Princesse Lalla Meryem	· 2006 →

Marion Bartoli and Émilie Loit were the defending champions, but Bartoli chose not to participate in 2005. Loit successfully defended her title, alongside Barbora Strýcová.

== Seeds ==
1. (China) Yan Zi / (China) Zheng Jie (quarterfinals)
2. (China) Li Ting / (China) Sun Tiantian (semifinals)
3. (Italy) Maria Elena Camerin / (Italy) Tathiana Garbin (quarterfinals)
4. (Slovakia) Ľubomíra Kurhajcová / (Thailand) Tamarine Tanasugarn (first round)

== Draw ==
=== Key ===
- Q = Qualifier
- WC = Wild card
- LL = Lucky loser
- Alt = Alternate
- SE = Special exempt
- PR = Protected ranking
- ITF = ITF entry
- JE = Junior exempt
- w/o = Walkover
- r = Retired
- d = Defaulted
- SR = Special ranking

=== Results ===
First round
1	(China) Z Yan (China) J Zheng	6	6
LL	(Australia) M Dittmann (Germany) S Weidemann	3	1
Q	(Colombia) C Castaño (India) S Uberoi	2	4
(China) N Li (Australia) N Pratt	6	6
4	(Slovakia) Ľ Kurhajcová (Thailand) T Tanasugarn	6^{5}	3
(Austria) D Klemenschits (Austria) S Klemenschits	7	6
(Spain) L Domínguez Lino (Spain) N Llagostera Vives	3	6	6
WC	(France) P Leroy (Morocco) B Mouhtassine	6	0	1
(France) É Loit (Czech Republic) B Strýcová	3	6	7
(Hungary) M Czink (Canada) M Drake	6	4	6^{3}
LL	(Morocco) M El Haddad (Morocco) H Ifrakh	4	3
3	(Italy) ME Camerin (Italy) T Garbin	6	6
(United States) A Augustus (Italy) An Serra Zanetti	2	2
(France) C Dhenin (Romania) A Vanc	6	6
(Republic of Ireland) K Liggan (Spain) A Parra Santonja	4	0
2	(China) T Li (China) T Sun	6	6

Quarterfinals
1	(China) Z Yan (China) J Zheng	0	5
(China) N Li (Australia) N Pratt	6	7
(Austria) D Klemenschits (Austria) S Klemenschits	2	1
(Spain) L Domínguez Lino (Spain) N Llagostera Vives	6	6
(France) É Loit (Czech Republic) B Strýcová	6	6
3	(Italy) ME Camerin (Italy) T Garbin	3	3
(France) C Dhenin (Romania) A Vanc	5	1
2	(China) T Li (China) T Sun	7	6

Semifinals
(China) N Li (Australia) N Pratt	4	5
(Spain) L Domínguez Lino (Spain) N Llagostera Vives	6	7
(France) É Loit (Czech Republic) B Strýcová	6	6
2	(China) T Li (China) T Sun	2	1

Final
(Spain) L Domínguez Lino (Spain) N Llagostera Vives	6	6^{5}	5
(France) É Loit (Czech Republic) B Strýcová	3	7	7
