= 1995 Fed Cup Europe/Africa Zone Group II – play-offs =

Tennis competition play-offs

The play-offs of the 1995 Fed Cup Europe/Africa Zone Group II were the final stages of the Group II Zonal Competition involving teams from Europe and Africa. Those that qualified for this stage placed first and second in their respective pools.

Placing	Pool A	Pool B	Pool C	Pool D
1	Greece	Portugal	Denmark	Ireland
2	Norway	Luxembourg	Macedonia	Yugoslavia
3	Morocco	Zimbabwe	Turkey	Malta
4	Tunisia	Estonia	Lithuania	Kenya
5	Egypt	Senegal	Botswana	Cyprus

The four teams were then paired up the team from a different placing of the other group for a play-off tie, with the winners being promoted to Group I in 1996.

== Greece vs. Macedonia ==
Greece
2
Nairobi Club, Nairobi, Kenya
13 May 1995
Clay (outdoors)

Macedonia
1

			1	2	3
1	(Greece) (North Macedonia)	Christina Zachariadou; Irena Mihailova	6; 1	6; 2
2	(Greece) (North Macedonia)	Christína Papadáki; Ivona Mihailova	6; 2	6; 2
3	(Greece) (North Macedonia)	Ariadne Katsouli / Christina Zachariadou; Irena Mihailova / Ivona Mihailova	4; 6	6^{1} 7^{7}

== Portugal vs. Luxembourg ==
Portugal
2
Nairobi Club, Nairobi, Kenya
13 May 1995
Clay (outdoors)

Luxembourg
1

			1	2	3
1	(Portugal) (Luxembourg)	Joana Pedroso; Michele Wagner	6; 3	7^{7} 6^{1}
2	(Portugal) (Luxembourg)	Sofia Prazeres; Rosabel Moyen	6; 4	1; 6	6; 3
3	(Portugal) (Luxembourg)	Manuela Costa / Joana Pedroso; Rosabel Moyen / Michele Wagner	4; 6	4; 6

== Denmark vs. Yugoslavia ==
Denmark
1
Nairobi Club, Nairobi, Kenya
13 May 1995
Clay (outdoors)

Yugoslavia
2

			1	2	3
1	(Denmark) (Federal Republic of Yugoslavia)	Tine Scheuer-Larsen; Branislava Ivanović	5; 7	2; 6
2	(Denmark) (Federal Republic of Yugoslavia)	Karin Ptaszek; Dragana Zarić	4; 6	3; 6
3	(Denmark) (Federal Republic of Yugoslavia)	Karin Ptaszek / Tine Scheuer-Larsen; Dragana Ilić / Katarina Mišić	1; 6	6; 3	6; 2

== Ireland vs. Norway ==
Ireland
1
Nairobi Club, Nairobi, Kenya
13 May 1995
Clay (outdoors)

Norway
2

			1	2	3
1	(Republic of Ireland) (Norway)	Gina Niland; Karoline Borgersen	1; 6	2; 6
2	(Republic of Ireland) (Norway)	Karen Nugent; Amy Jonsson-Råholt	6^{0} 7^{7}	2; 6
3	(Republic of Ireland) (Norway)	Claire Curran / Lesley O'Halloran; Karoline Borgersen / Amy Jonsson-Råholt				w/o

== See also ==
- Fed Cup structure
