= 2005 Grand Prix SAR La Princesse Lalla Meryem – Singles =

Singles
- 2005 Grand Prix SAR La Princesse Lalla Meryem

Final
- Champion: (Spain) Nuria Llagostera Vives
- Runner-up: (China) Zheng Jie
- Score: 6–4, 6–2

Events
Singles	Doubles
← 2004 ·	Grand Prix SAR La Princesse Lalla Meryem	· 2006 →

Émilie Loit was the defending champion, but lost to Nuria Llagostera Vives in the semifinals.

Llagostera Vives went on to win the title, defeating Zheng Jie 6–4, 6–2 in the final.

== Seeds ==
1. (China) Li Na (semifinals, retired due to a right ankle injury)
2. (Spain) Nuria Llagostera Vives (champion)
3. (Italy) Maria Elena Camerin (first round)
4. (Italy) Tathiana Garbin (quarterfinals)
5. (Thailand) Tamarine Tanasugarn (first round)
6. (China) Zheng Jie (finals)
7. (Spain) Arantxa Parra Santonja (quarterfinals)
8. (Luxembourg) Claudine Schaul (second round)

== Draw ==
=== Key ===
- Q = Qualifier
- WC = Wild card
- LL = Lucky loser
- Alt = Alternate
- SE = Special exempt
- PR = Protected ranking
- ITF = ITF entry
- JE = Junior exempt
- w/o = Walkover
- r = Retired
- d = Defaulted
- SR = Special ranking

=== Finals ===
Semifinals
1	(China) Li Na	3^{r}
6	(China) Zheng Jie	3
(France) Émilie Loit	4	1
2	(Spain) Nuria Llagostera Vives	6	6

Final
6	(China) Zheng Jie	4	2
2	(Spain) Nuria Llagostera Vives	6	6

=== Section 1 ===
First round
1	(China) N Li	6	6
(Australia) N Pratt	0	0
Q	(Serbia and Montenegro) J Dokić	6	6
(Slovakia) Ľ Kurhajcová	2	2
(Italy) An Serra Zanetti	6	6
(Hungary) M Czink	3	0
Q	(Ukraine) O Savchuk	6	6
5	(Thailand) T Tanasugarn	0	3
4	(Italy) T Garbin	7	4	6
(Slovakia) Ľ Cervanová	6^{3}	6	2
(Croatia) S Mamić	2	7	4
(Czech Republic) B Strýcová	6	6^{3}	6
LL	(Canada) M Drake	6	6
LL	(Italy) Ad Serra Zanetti	2	2
(Colombia) C Castaño	7	5	2
6	(China) J Zheng	5	7	6

Second round
1	(China) N Li	6	3	6
Q	(Serbia and Montenegro) J Dokić	0	6	2
(Italy) An Serra Zanetti	7	6
Q	(Ukraine) O Savchuk	6^{6}	4
4	(Italy) T Garbin	6	6
(Czech Republic) B Strýcová	4	4
LL	(Canada) M Drake	2	0
6	(China) J Zheng	6	6

Quarterfinals
1	(China) N Li	6	6
(Italy) An Serra Zanetti	3	0
4	(Italy) T Garbin	3	6^{3}
6	(China) J Zheng	6	7

Semifinals
1	(China) N Li	3^{r}
6	(China) J Zheng	3

=== Section 2 ===
First round
8	(Luxembourg) C Schaul	6	6
(Spain) M Sánchez Lorenzo	2	4
(France) É Loit	7	6
Q	(Austria) S Bammer	6^{5}	3
WC	(Morocco) H Ifrakh	2	4
(Spain) L Domínguez Lino	6	6
(Czech Republic) M Paštiková	6	6
3	(Italy) ME Camerin	2	4
7	(Spain) A Parra Santonja	3	6	0
(France) S Beltrame	6	4	0^{r}
(India) S Uberoi	4	2
Q	(China) Z Yan	6	6
(Luxembourg) A Kremer	6	6
(Argentina) M Díaz Oliva	4	3
WC	(Morocco) B Mouhtassine	3	4
2	(Spain) N Llagostera Vives	6	6

Second round
8	(Luxembourg) C Schaul	5	4
(France) É Loit	7	6
(Spain) L Domínguez Lino	6	7
(Czech Republic) M Paštiková	4	5
7	(Spain) A Parra Santonja	6	7
Q	(China) Z Yan	2	6^{5}
(Luxembourg) A Kremer	4	2
2	(Spain) N Llagostera Vives	6	6

Quarterfinals
(France) É Loit	6	7
(Spain) L Domínguez Lino	4	5
7	(Spain) A Parra Santonja	3	7	3
2	(Spain) N Llagostera Vives	6	5	6

Semifinals
(France) É Loit	4	1
2	(Spain) N Llagostera Vives	6	6
