= 2007 Grand Prix SAR La Princesse Lalla Meryem – Doubles =

Tennis tournament

Doubles
- 2007 Grand Prix SAR La Princesse Lalla Meryem

Final
- Champions: (United States) Vania King (India) Sania Mirza
- Runners-up: (Romania) Andreea Ehritt-Vanc (Russia) Anastasia Rodionova
- Score: 6–1, 6–2

Events
Singles	Doubles
← 2006 ·	Grand Prix SAR La Princesse Lalla Meryem	· 2008 →

Yan Zi and Zheng Jie were the defending champions, but neither chose to compete that year.

Vania King and Sania Mirza won the title 6–1, 6–2 over Andreea Ehritt-Vanc and Anastasia Rodionova in the final.

== Seeds ==
1. (United States) Vania King / (India) Sania Mirza (champions)
2. (Romania) Andreea Ehritt-Vanc / (Russia) Anastasia Rodionova (finals)
3. (United States) Jill Craybas / (Slovakia) Jarmila Gajdošová (first round)
4. (China) Ji Chunmei / (China) Sun Shengnan (first round)

== Results ==
=== Key ===
- Q = Qualifier
- WC = Wild card
- LL = Lucky loser
- Alt = Alternate
- SE = Special exempt
- PR = Protected ranking
- ITF = ITF entry
- JE = Junior exempt
- w/o = Walkover
- r = Retired
- d = Defaulted
- SR = Special ranking

=== Draw ===
First round
1	(United States) V King (India) S Mirza	6	5	[10]
(Russia) A Kudryavtseva (Ukraine) O Savchuk	3	7	[8]
(Australia) C Horiatopoulos (United States) A Rolle	6^{4}	5
(Spain) L Domínguez Lino (Spain) A Parra Santonja	7^{7}	7
3	(United States) J Craybas (Slovakia) J Gajdošová	6	6^{7}	[13]
(New Zealand) L Baker (Australia) N Kriz	3	7^{9}	[15]
(France) C Pin (Venezuela) M Sequera	3	6	[10]
(Switzerland) T Bacsinszky (Denmark) C Wozniacki	6	3	[6]
(Ukraine) Y Beygelzimer (Latvia) L Dekmeijere	2	2
(Hungary) M Czink (Argentina) ME Salerni	6	6
(United States) J Ditty (South Africa) N Grandin	6	6
4	(China) C Ji (China) S Sun	2	1
(Canada) S Dubois (Russia) A Jidkova	4	5
(Italy) S Disderi (United States) N Uberoi	6	7
WC	(Morocco) FZ El Allami (Morocco) N Lalami	2	1
2	(Romania) A Ehritt-Vanc (Russia) A Rodionova	6	6

Quarterfinals
1	(United States) V King (India) S Mirza	3	6	[10]
(Spain) L Domínguez Lino (Spain) A Parra Santonja	6	2	[5]
(New Zealand) L Baker (Australia) N Kriz	1	4
(France) C Pin (Venezuela) M Sequera	6	6
(Hungary) M Czink (Argentina) ME Salerni
(United States) J Ditty (South Africa) N Grandin	w/o
(Italy) S Disderi (United States) N Uberoi	1^{r}
2	(Romania) A Ehritt-Vanc (Russia) A Rodionova	4

Semifinals
1	(United States) V King (India) S Mirza	w/o
(France) C Pin (Venezuela) M Sequera
(United States) J Ditty (South Africa) N Grandin	4	2
2	(Romania) A Ehritt-Vanc (Russia) A Rodionova	6	6

Final
1	(United States) V King (India) S Mirza	6	6
2	(Romania) A Ehritt-Vanc (Russia) A Rodionova	1	2
