= 2006 Grand Prix SAR La Princesse Lalla Meryem – Doubles =

2006 WTA tour

Doubles
- 2006 Grand Prix SAR La Princesse Lalla Meryem

Final
- Champions: (China) Yan Zi (China) Zheng Jie
- Runners-up: (United States) Ashley Harkleroad (United States) Bethanie Mattek
- Score: 6–1, 6–3

Events
Singles	Doubles
← 2005 ·	Grand Prix SAR La Princesse Lalla Meryem	· 2007 →

Émilie Loit and Barbora Strýcová were the defending champions, but neither chose to compete that year.

Yan Zi and Zheng Jie won the title over Ashley Harkleroad and Bethanie Mattek in the final.

== Seeds ==
1. (China) Yan Zi / (China) Zheng Jie (champions)
2. (United States) Ashley Harkleroad / (United States) Bethanie Mattek (finals, runners-up)
3. (Russia) Anastasia Rodionova / (United States) Neha Uberoi (quarterfinals)
4. (Canada) Maureen Drake / (Venezuela) Milagros Sequera (semifinals)

== Results ==
=== Key ===
- Q = Qualifier
- WC = Wild card
- LL = Lucky loser
- Alt = Alternate
- SE = Special exempt
- PR = Protected ranking
- ITF = ITF entry
- JE = Junior exempt
- w/o = Walkover
- r = Retired
- d = Defaulted
- SR = Special ranking

=== Draw ===
First round
(Hungary) M Czink (United States) V King	6	6
(Ukraine) A Bondarenko (Ukraine) V Bondarenko	1	3
4	(Canada) M Drake (Venezuela) M Sequera	6	6
WC	(Luxembourg) A Kremer (Morocco) B Mouhtassine	4	4
WC	(France) Y Fedossova (Russia) L Skavronskaia	6	1	4
(Luxembourg) C Schaul (United States) A Tsoubanos	3	6	6
WC	(Morocco) R Bengelloun-Touimy (Morocco) L Bennani	0	2
(Czech Republic) H Šromová (Indonesia) A Widjaja	6	6
(Canada) S Dubois (United States) J Jackson	2	1
3	(Russia) A Rodionova (United States) N Uberoi	6	6
(Croatia) I Lisjak (Canada) A Wozniak	0	5
(France) C Pin (Tunisia) S Sfar	6	7

Quarterfinals
1	(China) Z Yan (China) J Zheng	6	6
(Hungary) M Czink (United States) V King	3	1
4	(Canada) M Drake (Venezuela) M Sequera	6	6
(Luxembourg) C Schaul (United States) A Tsoubanos	1	4
(Czech Republic) H Šromová (Indonesia) A Widjaja	6	6
3	(Russia) A Rodionova (United States) N Uberoi	2	3
(France) C Pin (Tunisia) S Sfar	3	3
2	(United States) A Harkleroad (United States) B Mattek	6	6

Semifinals
1	(China) Z Yan (China) J Zheng	6	7
4	(Canada) M Drake (Venezuela) M Sequera	4	6^{4}
(Czech Republic) H Šromová (Indonesia) A Widjaja	2	3
2	(United States) A Harkleroad (United States) B Mattek	6	6

Final
1	(China) Z Yan (China) J Zheng	6	6
2	(United States) A Harkleroad (United States) B Mattek	1	3
