= Beach volleyball at the 2021 SEA Games – Men's tournament =

Men's beach volleyball at the 2021 Southeast Asian Games
- Venue: Tuần Châu Beach
- Dates: 15–20 May 2022
- Competitors: 32 from 8 nations

Medalists
gold medal	Candra –Ashfiya; Gilang–Rendy	Indonesia
silver medal	Jongklang–Nakprakhong; Tipjan–Taovato	Thailand
bronze medal	Garcia–Arbasto; Abdilla–Jaron	Philippines

The men's beach volleyball tournament at the 2021 Southeast Asian Games took place at the Tuần Châu Beach, Quảng Ninh, Vietnam from 15 to 20 May 2022.

== Schedule ==
All times are Vietnam Standard Time (UTC+07:00)

Date	Time	Event
Sunday, 15 May 2022	09:00	Preliminary round
Monday, 16 May 2022	14:00	Preliminary round
Tuesday, 17 May 2022	09:00	Preliminary round
Wednesday, 18 May 2022	14:00	Preliminary round
Thursday, 19 May 2022	09:00	Semifinals
Thursday, 19 May 2022	11:00	Classification
Friday, 20 May 2022	09:45	Bronze medal match
Friday, 20 May 2022	14:00	Gold medal match

== Seeds ==
Teams were seeded is the preliminary round according to the following draw:

Seed	NOC	Team 1	Team 2
Host	Vietnam	Tôn Long Nhật – Nguyễn Văn Nhã	Nguyễn Lâm Tới – Trần Quang Vũ
1	Thailand	Surin Jongklang – Banlue Nakprakhong	Pithak Tipjan – Poravid Taovato
2	Indonesia	Ade Candra Rachmawan – Mohammad Ashfiya	Gilang Ramadhan – Rendy Verdian Licardo
3	Philippines	Jude Garcia Ungria – Anthony Lemuel Arbasto Jr. Macaraeg	Abdilla Alnakran Dalmino – Jaron Requinton
4	Singapore	Tay Zi Hao Kingsley – Tan Ray Meng, Trevis	Nicholas Kiu – Law Kai Jie Nicolas
5	Laos	Daovy Sanavongsay – Khampiene Sanyalack	Chanmina Chanthavong – Bounmixay Phommachan
6	Malaysia	Mohd Asri Bin Muharia – Shon Ngiap Shyang	Khairol Shazrime Shamsaimon – Sim Jian Qin
7	Cambodia	Chuk Sophea – Thy Menghuong	Oem Narit – Som Samith

== Results ==
=== Preliminary round ===
==== Pool A ====
Pos	Team	Pld	W	L	Pts	SW	SL	SR	SPW	SPL	SPR	Qualification
1	Philippines	7	6	1	13	13	3	4.333	318	263	1.209	Semifinals
2	Vietnam	8	5	3	13	11	6	1.833	374	360	1.039	Semifinals
3	Cambodia	7	3	4	10	7	9	0.778	301	306	0.984	Fifth place match
4	Singapore	6	0	6	6	1	12	0.083	200	255	0.784	Seventh place match

Date		Score		Set 1	Set 2	Set 3
15 May	T.L.Nhật – N.V.Nhã (Vietnam)	0–2	(Cambodia) Chuk – Thy	22–24	19–21	
15 May	N.L.Tới – T.Q.Vũ (Vietnam)	2–0	(Cambodia) Oem – Som	21–19	27–25	
15 May	N.L.Tới – T.Q.Vũ (Vietnam)	2–1 (GS)	(Cambodia) Chuk – Thy	19–21	21–18	25–23
15 May	Garcia – Arbasto (Philippines)	2–0	(Singapore) Tay Z.H.K – T. Tan	21–15	21–17	
15 May	Abdilla – Jaron (Philippines)	2–0	(Singapore) Kiu N. – Nicolas L.	22–20	21–16	
16 May	Chuk – Thy (Cambodia)	2–1	(Singapore) Tay Z.H.K – T. Tan	21–17	13–21	15–7
16 May	Oem – Som (Cambodia)	2–0	(Singapore) Kiu N. – Nicolas L.	21–12	21–11	
17 May	Garcia – Arbasto (Philippines)	2–0	(Cambodia) Chuk – Thy	21–15	21–16	
17 May	Abdilla – Jaron (Philippines)	2–0	(Cambodia) Oem – Som	21–14	21–14	
17 May	T.L.Nhật – N.V.Nhã (Vietnam)	2–0	(Singapore) Tay Z.H.K – T. Tan	21–16	21–19	
17 May	N.L.Tới – T.Q.Vũ (Vietnam)	2–0	(Singapore) Kiu N. – Nicolas L.	21–19	21–10	
18 May	T.L.Nhật – N.V.Nhã (Vietnam)	2–1	(Philippines) Garcia – Arbasto	21–15	17–21	15–12
18 May	N.L.Tới – T.Q.Vũ (Vietnam)	1–2	(Philippines) Abdilla – Jaron	21–19	16–21	13–15
18 May	T.L.Nhật – N.V.Nhã (Vietnam)	0–2 (GS)	(Philippines) Garcia – Jaron	18–21	15–21	

==== Pool B ====
Pos	Team	Pld	W	L	Pts	SW	SL	SR	SPW	SPL	SPR	Qualification
1	Indonesia	7	6	1	13	13	2	6.500	298	246	1.211	Semifinals
2	Thailand	7	5	2	12	10	5	2.000	315	313	1.006	Semifinals
3	Malaysia	7	3	4	10	7	13	0.538	250	304	0.822	Fifth place match
4	Laos	6	0	6	6	0	12	0.000	175	215	0.814	Seventh place match

Date		Score		Set 1	Set 2	Set 3
15 May	J. Surin – N. Banlue (Thailand)	2–0	(Malaysia) Bin Muharia – Shon	21–10	21–13	
15 May	T. Pithak – T. Poravid (Thailand)	1–2	(Malaysia) Khairol – Sim J.Q.	21–18	9–21	19–21
15 May	J. Surin – N. Banlue (Thailand)	2–1 (GS)	(Malaysia) Khairol – Sim J.Q.	18–21	21–11	15–7
16 May	Candra – Ashfiya (Indonesia)	2–0	(Thailand) J.Surin – N.Banlue	21–15	21–17	
16 May	Gilang – Rendy (Indonesia)	1–2	(Thailand) T. Pithak – T. Poravid	20–22	21–14	16–18
16 May	Candra – Ashfiya (Indonesia)	2–0 (GS)	(Thailand) N. Banlue – T. Poravid	21–14	28–26	
16 May	Bin Muharia – Shon (Malaysia)	2–0	(Laos) Daovy – Sanyalack	26–24	21–17	
16 May	Khairol – Sim J.Q. (Malaysia)	2–0	(Laos) Chanthavong – Phommachan	21–11	21–19	
17 May	Candra – Ashfiya (Indonesia)	2–0	(Laos) Daovy – Sanyalack	21–15	21–17	
17 May	Gilang – Rendy (Indonesia)	2–0	(Laos) Chanthavong – Phommachan	21–16	21–13	
18 May	J. Surin – N. Banlue (Thailand)	2–0	(Laos) Daovy – Sanyalack	21–10	21–18	
18 May	T. Pithak – T. Poravid (Thailand)	2–0	(Laos) Chanthavong – Phommachan	21–7	21–8	
18 May	Candra – Ashfiya (Indonesia)	2–0	(Malaysia) Bin Muharia – Shon	21–11	21–9	
18 May	Gilang – Rendy (Indonesia)	2–0	(Malaysia) Khairol – Sim J.Q.	21–16	25–23	

=== Knockout round ===
Semifinals
A1	Philippines	0	2	0
B2	Thailand	2	0	2
B1	Indonesia	2	2
A2	Vietnam	0	1

Finals
B2	Thailand	0	0
B1	Indonesia	2	2
Third place
A1	Philippines	2	0	2
A2	Vietnam	0	2	0

==== Semifinals ====
Date		Score		Set 1	Set 2	Set 3
19 May	Garcia – Arbasto (Philippines)	0–2	(Thailand) J. Surin – N. Banlue	20–22	14–21	
19 May	Abdilla – Jaron (Philippines)	2–0	(Thailand) T. Pithak – T. Poravid	21–19	21–13	
19 May	Garcia – Jaron (Philippines)	0–2 (GS)	(Thailand) J. Surin – N. Banlue	18–21	18–21	
19 May	Candra – Ashfiya (Indonesia)	2–0	(Vietnam) T.L.Nhật – N.V.Nhã	21–15	21–16	
19 May	Gilang – Rendy (Indonesia)	2–1	(Vietnam) N.L.Tới – T.Q.Vũ	17–21	21–14	15–10

==== Seventh place match ====
Date		Score		Set 1	Set 2	Set 3
18 May	Tay Z.H.K – T. Tan (Singapore)	2–0	(Laos) Daovy – Sanyalack	21–16	21–17	
18 May	Kiu N. – Nicolas L. (Singapore)	2–1	(Laos) Chanthavong – Phommachan	21–15	21–23	15–11

==== Fifth place match ====
Date		Score		Set 1	Set 2	Set 3
20 May	Chuk – Thy (Cambodia)	2–0	(Malaysia) Bin Muharia – Shon	21–10	21–19	
20 May	Oem – Som (Cambodia)	0–2	(Malaysia) Khairol – Sim J.Q.	16–21	11–21	
20 May	Oem – Som (Cambodia)	2–0	(Malaysia) Khairol – Sim J.Q.	21–13	21–15	

==== Bronze medal match ====
Date		Score		Set 1	Set 2	Set 3
20 May	Garcia – Arbasto (Philippines)	2–0	(Vietnam) T.L.Nhật – N.V.Nhã	21–19	21–19	
20 May	Abdilla – Jaron (Philippines)	0–2	(Vietnam) N.L.Tới – T.Q.Vũ	19–21	18–21	
20 May	Garcia – Jaron (Philippines)	2–0 (GS)	(Vietnam) N.L.Tới – T.Q.Vũ	21–15	21–19	

==== Gold medal match ====
Date		Score		Set 1	Set 2	Set 3
20 May	J. Surin – N. Banlue (Thailand)	0–2	(Indonesia) Candra – Ashfiya	13–21	18–21	
20 May	T. Pithak – T. Poravid (Thailand)	0–2	(Indonesia) Gilang – Rendy	17–21	15–21	

== See also ==
- Women's tournament
