= 2012 Fed Cup Europe/Africa Zone Group III – Pool A =

Group A of the 2012 Fed Cup Europe/Africa Zone Group III was one of two pools in the Europe/Africa zone of the 2012 Fed Cup. Five teams competed in a round robin competition, with the top two teams and the bottom teams proceeding to their respective sections of the play-offs: the top teams played for advancement to the Group II.

		(Morocco) MAR	(Armenia) ARM	(Republic of Ireland) IRL	(Malta) MLT	(Kenya) KEN	RR; W–L	Set; W–L	Game; W–L	Standings
71	Morocco		2–1	2–1	2–1	3–0	4–0	20–7	142–86	1
73	Armenia	1–2		1–2	3–0	3–0	2–2	19–8	106–42	3
80	Ireland	1–2	2–1		2–1	3–0	3–1	17–12	110–73	2
89	Malta	1–2	0–3	1–2		3–0	1–3	11–16	94–125	4
	Kenya	0–3	0–3	0–3	0–3		0–4	0–24	18–144	5

== Armenia vs. Kenya ==
Armenia
3
Golf El Solaimaneyah Club, Cairo, Egypt
16 April 2012
Red clay (outdoors)

Kenya
0

			1	2	3
1	(Armenia) (Kenya)	Anna Movsisyan; Veronica Osogo Nabwire	6; 0	6; 1
2	(Armenia) (Kenya)	Ani Amiraghyan; Caroline Oduor	6; 0	6; 0
3	(Armenia) (Kenya)	Nune Khachatryan / Anna Movsisyan; Caroline Oduor / Michelle Kerubo Onyancha	6; 0	6; 1

== Ireland vs. Malta ==
Ireland
2
Golf El Solaimaneyah Club, Cairo, Egypt
16 April 2012
Red clay (outdoors)

Malta
1

			1	2	3
1	(Republic of Ireland) (Malta)	Sinéad Lohan; Elaine Genovese	6; 4	1; 6	6; 2
2	(Republic of Ireland) (Malta)	Amy Bowtell; Rosanne Dimech	6; 0	6; 2
3	(Republic of Ireland) (Malta)	Jenny Claffey / Lynsey McCullough; Rosanne Dimech / Maria Giorgia Farrugia Sacco	6; 7	6; 4	5; 7

== Morocco vs. Kenya ==
Morocco
3
Golf El Solaimaneyah Club, Cairo, Egypt
17 April 2012
Red clay (outdoors)

Kenya
0

			1	2	3
1	(Morocco) (Kenya)	Fatima El Allami; Michelle Kerubo Onyancha	6; 0	6; 0
2	(Morocco) (Kenya)	Nadia Lalami; Caroline Oduor	6; 0	6; 0
3	(Morocco) (Kenya)	Fatyha Berjane / Bahia Mouhtassine; Caroline Oduor / Veronica Osogo Nabwire	6; 1	6; 0

== Armenia vs. Malta ==
Armenia
3
Golf El Solaimaneyah Club, Cairo, Egypt
17 April 2012
Red clay (outdoors)

Malta
0

			1	2	3
1	(Armenia) (Malta)	Anna Movsisyan; Elaine Genovese	6; 3	6; 1
2	(Armenia) (Malta)	Ani Amiraghyan; Rosanne Dimech	6; 0	6; 1
3	(Armenia) (Malta)	Ani Amiraghyan / Anna Movsisyan; Rosanne Dimech / Elaine Genovese	6; 1	6; 1

== Morocco vs. Ireland ==
Morocco
2
Golf El Solaimaneyah Club, Cairo, Egypt
18 April 2012
Red clay (outdoors)

Ireland
1

			1	2	3
1	(Morocco) (Republic of Ireland)	Fatima El Allami; Sinéad Lohan	6; 3	6; 4
2	(Morocco) (Republic of Ireland)	Nadia Lalami; Amy Bowtell	7; 5	6; 1
3	(Morocco) (Republic of Ireland)	Fatyha Berjane / Bahia Mouhtassine; Jenny Claffey / Lynsey McCullough	7^{7} 6^{5}	5; 7	2; 6

== Malta vs. Kenya ==
Malta
3
Golf El Solaimaneyah Club, Cairo, Egypt
18 April 2012
Red clay (outdoors)

Kenya
0

			1	2	3
1	(Malta) (Kenya)	Maria Giorgia Farrugia Sacco; Veronica Osogo Nabwire	6; 3	6; 4
2	(Malta) (Kenya)	Elaine Genovese; Caroline Oduor	6; 2	6; 1
3	(Malta) (Kenya)	Rosanne Dimech / Elaine Genovese; Caroline Oduor / Veronica Osogo Nabwire	6; 1	6; 2

== Morocco vs. Malta ==
Morocco
2
Golf El Solaimaneyah Club, Cairo, Egypt
19 April 2012
Red clay (outdoors)

Malta
1

			1	2	3
1	(Morocco) (Malta)	Fatima El Allami; Maria Giorgia Farrugia Sacco	6; 1	6; 0
2	(Morocco) (Malta)	Nadia Lalami; Elaine Genovese	0; 6	6; 3	4; 6
3	(Morocco) (Malta)	Fatyha Berjane / Bahia Mouhtassine; Maria Giorgia Farrugia Sacco / Elaine Genovese	6; 1	6; 2

== Armenia vs. Ireland ==
Armenia
1
Golf El Solaimaneyah Club, Cairo, Egypt
19 April 2012
Red clay (outdoors)

Ireland
2

			1	2	3
1	(Armenia) (Republic of Ireland)	Anna Movsisyan; Sinéad Lohan	6; 4	6^{4} 7^{7}	3; 6
2	(Armenia) (Republic of Ireland)	Ani Amiraghyan; Amy Bowtell	6; 4	6; 4
3	(Armenia) (Republic of Ireland)	Ani Amiraghyan / Anna Movsisyan; Amy Bowtell / Jenny Claffey	1; 6	6; 4	2; 6

== Morocco vs. Armenia ==
Morocco
2
Golf El Solaimaneyah Club, Cairo, Egypt
20 April 2012
Red clay (outdoors)

Armenia
1

			1	2	3
1	(Morocco) (Armenia)	Fatima El Allami; Anna Movsisyan	6; 4	7; 5
2	(Morocco) (Armenia)	Nadia Lalami; Ani Amiraghyan	3; 6	0; 6
3	(Morocco) (Armenia)	Fatyha Berjane / Bahia Mouhtassine; Ani Amiraghyan / Anna Movsisyan	7^{7} 6^{5}	4; 6	6; 1

== Ireland vs. Kenya ==
Ireland
3
Golf El Solaimaneyah Club, Cairo, Egypt
20 April 2012
Red clay (outdoors)

Kenya
0

			1	2	3
1	(Republic of Ireland) (Kenya)	Sinéad Lohan; Michelle Kerubo Onyancha	6; 1	6; 0
2	(Republic of Ireland) (Kenya)	Amy Bowtell; Veronica Osogo Nabwire	6; 0	6; 0
3	(Republic of Ireland) (Kenya)	Amy Bowtell / Lynsey McCullough; Caroline Oduor / Michelle Kerubo Onyancha	6; 1	6; 0

== See also ==
- Fed Cup structure
