= Bahia Mouhtassine =

Moroccan tennis player

- Country (sports): Morocco
- Residence: Mohammedia, Morocco
- Born: 23 August 1979 (age 46) Mohammedia
- Turned pro: 1999
- Retired: 2007
- Plays: Right (two-handed backhand)
- Prize money: $200,051

Singles
- Career record: 291–197
- Career titles: 11 ITF
- Highest ranking: No. 139 (24 June 2002)

Grand Slam singles results
- Australian Open: 1R (2002)
- French Open: 1R (2003)
- Wimbledon: Q1 (2003)
- US Open: Q2 (2002)

Doubles
- Career record: 115–127
- Career titles: 9 ITF
- Highest ranking: No. 143 (4 November 2002)

Team competitions
- Fed Cup: 15–7
Medal record
Representing Morocco
Women's tennis
Pan Arab Games
Gold medal – first place	1997 Beirut	Singles
Gold medal – first place	1997 Beirut	Doubles
Gold medal – first place	1997 Beirut	Team
Gold medal – first place	2004 Algiers	Singles
Gold medal – first place	2004 Algiers	Doubles
Gold medal – first place	2004 Algiers	Team
Mediterranean Games
Gold medal – first place	2001 Tunis	Singles
|}

Bahia Mouhtassine (born 23 August 1979) is a Moroccan former professional tennis player. Her career-high singles ranking is No.139, achieved on 24 June 2002. She is the highest ever ranked female player from Morocco.

== Biography ==
Mouhtassine is the first female Moroccan player to feature at the main draw of a Grand Slam tournament. She lost in the first rounds of the 2002 Australian Open and 2003 French Open to Spanish Anabel Medina Garrigues and Czech Zuzana Ondrášková, respectively.

In her career, Mouhtassine won eleven ITF Women's Circuit singles titles and nine doubles titles. She also played on many WTA Tour events, won six gold medals at the Pan Arab Games and one gold at the Mediterranean Games, representing Morocco. Mouthassine's biggest career win was at the Grand Prix SAR La Princesse Lalla Meryem in Casablanca in 2004. She upset third-seeded Katarina Srebotnik, who was ranked 183 spots above her, in straight sets. She has also beaten Sania Mirza at an ITF final in Rabat in 2004.

Bahia retired after losing in the first round of the 2007 Grand Prix SAR La Princesse Lalla Meryem to Vania King.

== ITF finals ==
$100,000 tournaments
$75,000 tournaments
$50,000 tournaments
$25,000 tournaments
$10,000 tournaments

=== Singles (11–8) ===
Result	No.	Date	Tournament	Surface	Opponent	Score
Win	1.	3 August 1997	Rabat, Morocco	Clay	(Spain) Julia Carballal-Fernandez	6–2, 6–0
Win	2.	26 October 1997	Ceuta, Spain	Hard	(Spain) Ana Salas Lozano	6–2, 2–6, 7–5
Win	3.	17 May 1998	Tortosa, Spain	Clay	(Spain) Patricia Aznar	7–6, 6–2
Loss	4.	1 June 1998	Ceuta, Spain	Clay	(Spain) Gisela Riera	5–7, 6–2, 2–6
Win	5.	26 July 1998	Rabat, Morocco	Clay	(Austria) Nina Schwarz	5–7, 6–1, 6–1
Loss	6.	21 September 1998	Bucharest, Romania	Clay	(Hungary) Anna Földényi	4–6, 4–6
Win	7.	30 November 1998	Cairo, Egypt	Clay	(Georgia (country)) Nino Louarsabishvili	3–6, 6–3, 6–2
Win	8.	1 November 1999	Ain Sukhna, Egypt	Clay	(Bosnia and Herzegovina) Sandra Martinović	1–6, 6–4, 6–0
Win	9.	30 April 2000	Talence, France	Hard	(France) Anne-Laure Heitz	7–6^{(4)}, 7–6^{(2)}
Loss	10.	28 May 2000	Guimarães, Portugal	Hard	(Hungary) Kira Nagy	0–6, 7–5, 6–7^{(4)}
Loss	11.	1 July 2001	Fontanafredda, Italy	Clay	(Croatia) Jelena Kostanić Tošić	4–6, 3–6
Loss	12.	30 October 2001	Bolton, England	Hard (i)	(Belgium) Els Callens	6–4, 4–6, 1–6
Win	13.	5 November 2001	Cairo, Egypt	Clay	(Slovakia) Gabriela Voleková	1–6, 6–3, 7–5
Loss	14.	16 June 2002	Grado, Italy	Clay	(Romania) Edina Gallovits-Hall	3–6, 3–6
Win	15.	3 April 2004	Rabat, Morocco	Clay	(India) Sania Mirza	6–2, 7–5
Win	16.	18 April 2004	Biarritz, France	Clay	(France) Laura Pous Tió	6–4, 7–6^{(4)}
Loss	17.	30 May 2004	Tongliao, China	Hard	(China) Li Na	4–6, 6–2, 6–7^{(5)}
Loss	18.	15 August 2004	Martina Franca, Italy	Hard	(Switzerland) Timea Bacsinszky	4–6, 4–6
Win	19.	5 September 2004	Mestre, Italy	Clay	(Netherlands) Michelle Gerards	6–1, 6–0

=== Doubles (9–7) ===
Result	No.	Date	Tournament	Surface	Partner	Opponents	Score
Win	1.	4 August 1996	Caserta, Italy	Clay	(Netherlands) Marielle Bruens	(Germany) Inga Bertschmann (Portugal) Joana Pedroso	6–4, 6–4
Win	2.	5 August 1996	Carthage, Tunisia	Clay	(Netherlands) Marielle Bruens	(France) Sandrine Bouilleau (Tunisia) Selima Sfar	w/o
Win	3.	3 August 1997	Rabat, Morocco	Clay	(Netherlands) Nadine van de Walle	(Germany) Brigitte Loogen (United Kingdom) Lucy McDonald	6–3, 6–3
Win	4.	30 November 1998	Cairo, Egypt	Clay	(Georgia (country)) Nino Louarsabishvili	(Italy) Sabina Da Ponte (Italy) Nathalie Viérin	7–5, 6–3
Win	5.	7 December 1998	Ismailia, Egypt	Clay	(Georgia (country)) Nino Louarsabishvili	(Federal Republic of Yugoslavia) Ljiljana Nanušević (Slovakia) Gabriela Voleková	6–3, 6–3
Loss	6.	1 November 1999	Ain Sukhna, Egypt	Clay	(Austria) Susanne Filipp	(Italy) Sabina Da Ponte (Slovakia) Silvia Uricková	3–6, 5–7
Loss	7.	4 June 2001	Galatina, Italy	Clay	(Romania) Andreea Ehritt-Vanc	(Brazil) Vanessa Menga (Madagascar) Dally Randriantefy	6–3, 0–6, 5–7
Win	8.	30 October 2001	Bolton, England	Hard (i)	(Russia) Maria Goloviznina	(Serbia and Montenegro) Sandra Načuk (Serbia and Montenegro) Dragana Zarić	6–4, 6–3
Loss	9.	1 April 2002	Dubai, United Arab Emirates	Hard	(Indonesia) Angelique Widjaja	(Netherlands) Seda Noorlander (Germany) Kirstin Freye	2–6, 4–6
Loss	10.	9 June 2002	Galatina, Italy	Clay	(Austria) Sylvia Plischke	(Romania) Edina Gallovits-Hall (Romania) Andreea Ehritt-Vanc	3–6, 2–6
Loss	11.	8 June 2003	Galatina, Italy	Clay	(Romania) Andreea Ehritt-Vanc	(Spain) Arantxa Parra Santonja (Argentina) María Emilia Salerni	0–6, 6–7^{(6)}
Loss	12.	5 October 2003	Caserta, Italy	Clay	(Spain) Rosa María Andrés Rodríguez	(Estonia) Maret Ani (Italy) Giulia Casoni	5–7, 5–7
Loss	13.	5 December 2004	Ra'anana, Israel	Hard	(Turkey) İpek Şenoğlu	(Israel) Tzipora Obziler (Israel) Shahar Pe'er	3–6, 0–6
Win	14.	28 May 2005	Campobasso, Italy	Clay	(Italy) Giulia Casoni	(Slovakia) Katarína Kachlíková (Slovakia) Lenka Tvarošková	6–0, 7–5
Win	15.	12 May 2006	Rabat, Morocco	Clay	(France) Émilie Bacquet	(Romania) Raluca Olaru (Bolivia) María Fernanda Álvarez Terán	w/o
Win	16.	4 June 2006	Tortosa, Spain	Clay	(France) Émilie Bacquet	(France) Laura Thorpe (Spain) Irene Rehberger Bescos	1–6, 6–4, 7–6^{(5)}

== National representation ==
=== Fed Cup ===
Mouhtassine made her Fed Cup debut for Morocco in 1995, while the team was competing in the Europe/Africa Zone Group II, when she was 15 years and 259 days old.

==== Fed Cup ====
Group membership World Group World Group Play-off World Group II World Group II Play-off Europe/Africa Group (13–7)	Matches by surface Hard (0–0) Clay (15–7)	Matches by type Singles (7–1) Doubles (8–6)	Matches by setting Indoors (0–0) Outdoors (15–7)

===== Singles (6–1) =====
Edition	Stage	Date	Location	Against	Surface	Opponent	W/L	Score
1995 Fed Cup; Europe/Africa Zone Group II	Pool A	9 May 1995	Nairobi, Kenya	Greece	Clay	Christina Zachariadou	L	2–6, 2–6
1995 Fed Cup; Europe/Africa Zone Group II	Pool A	11 May 1995	Nairobi, Kenya	Egypt	Clay	Shahira Tawfik	W	6–2, 7–5
1995 Fed Cup; Europe/Africa Zone Group II	Pool A	12 May 1995	Nairobi, Kenya	Tunisia	Clay	Selima Sfar	W	w/o *
1999 Fed Cup; Europe/Africa Zone Group II	Pool C	26 April 1999	Murcia, Spain	Lithuania	Clay	Galina Misiuriova	W	6–4, 6–3
1999 Fed Cup; Europe/Africa Zone Group II	Pool C	28 April 1999	Murcia, Spain	Cyprus	Clay	Stephanie Kamberi	W	6–1, 6–4
1999 Fed Cup; Europe/Africa Zone Group II	Pool C	30 April 1999	Murcia, Spain	Estonia	Clay	Ilona Poljakova	W	6–4, 6–7^{(5–7)}, 6–1
2003 Fed Cup; Europe/Africa Zone Group II	Pool D	30 April 2003	Estoril, Portugal	Malta	Clay	Sarah Wetz	W	6–0, 6–0
2003 Fed Cup; Europe/Africa Zone Group II	Pool D	1 May 2003	Estoril, Portugal	Lithuania	Clay	Edita Liachovičiūtė	W	6–1, 7–6^{(7–2)}

* walkover doesn't count in her overall record.

===== Doubles (7–6) =====
Edition	Stage	Date	Location	Against	Surface	Partner	Opponents	W/L	Score
1995 Fed Cup; Europe/Africa Zone Group II	Pool A	9 May 1995	Nairobi, Kenya	Greece	Clay	Lamia Alami	Christína Papadáki; Christina Zachariadou	L	6–7^{(4–7)}, 1–6
1995 Fed Cup; Europe/Africa Zone Group II	Pool A	10 May 1995	Nairobi, Kenya	Norway	Clay	Habiba Ifrakh	Mette Sigmundstad; Molly Ulvin	L	5–7, 6–7^{(3–7)}
1995 Fed Cup; Europe/Africa Zone Group II	Pool A	11 May 1995	Nairobi, Kenya	Egypt	Clay	Lamia Alami	Mehry Shawki; Shahira Tawfik	W	6–1, 6–0
1995 Fed Cup; Europe/Africa Zone Group II	Pool A	12 May 1995	Nairobi, Kenya	Tunisia	Clay	Habiba Ifrakh	Imen Ben Larbi; Selima Sfar	W	w/o *
1999 Fed Cup; Europe/Africa Zone Group II	Pool C	26 April 1999	Murcia, Spain	Lithuania	Clay	Meryem El Haddad	Edita Liachovičiūtė; Galina Misiuriova	W	1–6, 6–2, 6–3
1999 Fed Cup; Europe/Africa Zone Group II	Pool C	29 April 1999	Murcia, Spain	Kenya	Clay	Meryem El Haddad	Florence Mbugua; Evelyn Otula	W	6–0, 6–0
1999 Fed Cup; Europe/Africa Zone Group II	Pool C	30 April 1999	Murcia, Spain	Estonia	Clay	Meryem El Haddad	Maret Ani; Liina Suurvarik	W	6–3, 2–6, 6–1
2003 Fed Cup; Europe/Africa Zone Group II	Pool D	30 April 2003	Estoril, Portugal	Malta	Clay	Mouna Sabri	Lisa Camenzuli; Carol Cassar-Torreggiani	L	6–4, 1–6, 3–6
2003 Fed Cup; Europe/Africa Zone Group II	Pool D	1 May 2003	Estoril, Portugal	Lithuania	Clay	Habiba Ifrakh	Edita Liachovičiūtė; Lina Stančiūtė	L	4–6, 2–6
2012 Fed Cup; Europe/Africa Zone Group III	Pool A	17 April 2012	Cairo, Egypt	Kenya	Clay	Fatyha Berjane	Caroline Oduor; Veronica Osogo Nabwire	W	6–1, 6–0
2012 Fed Cup; Europe/Africa Zone Group III	Pool A	18 April 2012	Cairo, Egypt	(Republic of Ireland) Ireland	Clay	Fatyha Berjane	Jennifer Claffey; Lynsey McCullough	L	7–6^{(7–5)}, 5–7, 2–6
2012 Fed Cup; Europe/Africa Zone Group III	Pool A	19 April 2012	Cairo, Egypt	Malta	Clay	Fatyha Berjane	Maria Giorgia Farrugia Sacco; Elaine Genovese	W	6–1, 6–2
2012 Fed Cup; Europe/Africa Zone Group III	Pool A	20 April 2012	Cairo, Egypt	Armenia	Clay	Fatyha Berjane	Ani Amiraghyan; Anna Movsisyan	W	7–6^{(7–5)}, 4–6, 6–1
2012 Fed Cup; Europe/Africa Zone Group III	PPO	21 April 2012	Cairo, Egypt	Lithuania	Clay	Fatima El Allami	Justina Mikulskytė; Lina Stančiūtė	L	4–6, 5–7

* walkover doesn't count in her overall record.
