= 1995 Fed Cup Europe/Africa Zone Group II – Pool B =

International tennis competition

Group B of the 1995 Fed Cup Europe/Africa Zone Group II was one of four pools in the Europe/Africa Zone Group II of the 1995 Fed Cup. Five teams competed in a round robin competition, with the top two teams advancing to the play-offs.

	(Portugal) POR	(Luxembourg) LUX	(Zimbabwe) ZIM	(Estonia) EST	(Senegal) SEN	Match; W–L	Set; W–L	Game; W–L	Standings
Portugal		2–1	3–0	3–0	3–0	4–0	23–5	160–88	1
Luxembourg	1–2		2–1	3–0	3–0	3–1	18–10	153–112	2
Zimbabwe	0–3	1–2		3–0	3–0	2–2	17–11	143–122	3
Estonia	0–3	0–3	0–3		2–1	1–3	6–19	94–135	4
Senegal	0–3	0–3	0–3	1–2		0–4	3–22	46–139	5

== Portugal vs. Senegal ==
Portugal
3
Nairobi Club, Nairobi, Kenya
8 May 1995
Clay (outdoors)

Senegal
0

			1	2	3
1	(Portugal) (Senegal)	Joana Pedroso; Assa Berthe	6; 2	6; 2
2	(Portugal) (Senegal)	Sofia Prazeres; Amy Berthe	6; 1	6; 0
3	(Portugal) (Senegal)	Manuela Costa / Sofia Prazeres; Amy Berthe / Sadia Berthe-Hoffman	6; 2	6; 2

== Zimbabwe vs. Estonia ==
Zimbabwe
3
Nairobi Club, Nairobi, Kenya
8 May 1995
Clay (outdoors)

Estonia
0

			1	2	3
1	(Zimbabwe) (Estonia)	Paula Iversen; Liina Suurvarik	6; 3	6^{5} 7^{7}	8; 6
2	(Zimbabwe) (Estonia)	Julia Muir; Helina Lill	7^{8} 6^{6}	6; 4
3	(Zimbabwe) (Estonia)	Paula Iversen / Julia Muir; Helen Laupa / Helina Lill	6; 1	6; 0

== Portugal vs. Luxembourg ==
Portugal
2
Nairobi Club, Nairobi, Kenya
9 May 1995
Clay (outdoors)

Luxembourg
1

			1	2	3
1	(Portugal) (Luxembourg)	Joana Pedroso; Michele Wagner	6^{5} 7^{7}	6; 4	5; 7
2	(Portugal) (Luxembourg)	Sofia Prazeres; Rosabel Moyen	0; 6	6; 3	6; 3
3	(Portugal) (Luxembourg)	Joana Pedroso / Sofia Prazeres; Rosabel Moyen / Michele Wagner	4; 6	6; 3	6; 3

== Estonia vs. Senegal ==
Estonia
2
Nairobi Club, Nairobi, Kenya
9 May 1995
Clay (outdoors)

Senegal
1

			1	2	3
1	(Estonia) (Senegal)	Liina Suurvarik; Assa Berthe	6; 3	6; 2
2	(Estonia) (Senegal)	Helina Lill; Amy Berthe	2; 6	1; 6
3	(Estonia) (Senegal)	Helina Lill / Liina Suurvarik; Amy Berthe / Sadia Berthe-Hoffman	6; 4	6; 4

== Portugal vs. Zimbabwe ==
Portugal
3
Nairobi Club, Nairobi, Kenya
10 May 1995
Clay (outdoors)

Zimbabwe
0

			1	2	3
1	(Portugal) (Zimbabwe)	Joana Pedroso; Paula Iversen	6; 2	6; 4
2	(Portugal) (Zimbabwe)	Sofia Prazeres; Julia Muir	6; 4	6; 0
3	(Portugal) (Zimbabwe)	Manuela Costa / Sofia Prazeres; Paula Iversen / Julia Muir	6^{4} 7^{7}	6; 2	7^{8} 6^{6}

== Luxembourg vs. Senegal ==
Luxembourg
3
Nairobi Club, Nairobi, Kenya
10 May 1995
Clay (outdoors)

Senegal
0

			1	2	3
1	(Luxembourg) (Senegal)	Michele Wagner; Assa Berthe	6; 0	6; 1
2	(Luxembourg) (Senegal)	Rosabel Moyen; Amy Berthe	6; 0	6; 1
3	(Luxembourg) (Senegal)	Rosabel Moyen / Michele Wagner; Amy Berthe / Sadia Berthe-Hoffman	6; 2	6; 2

== Portugal vs. Estonia ==
Portugal
3
Nairobi Club, Nairobi, Kenya
11 May 1995
Clay (outdoors)

Estonia
0

			1	2	3
1	(Portugal) (Estonia)	Joana Pedroso; Liina Suurvarik	6; 3	6; 3
2	(Portugal) (Estonia)	Sofia Prazeres; Helina Lill	6; 1	6; 2
3	(Portugal) (Estonia)	Manuela Costa / Joana Pedroso; Helina Lill / Liina Suurvarik	6; 3	6; 4

== Luxembourg vs. Zimbabwe ==
Luxembourg
2
Nairobi Club, Nairobi, Kenya
11 May 1995
Clay (outdoors)

Zimbabwe
1

			1	2	3
1	(Luxembourg) (Zimbabwe)	Michele Wagner; Paula Iversen	6; 4	6; 1
2	(Luxembourg) (Zimbabwe)	Rosabel Moyen; Julia Muir	6^{7} 7^{9}	6; 4	7; 5
3	(Luxembourg) (Zimbabwe)	Rosabel Moyen / Michele Wagner; Paula Iversen / Julia Muir	4; 6	1; 6

== Luxembourg vs. Estonia ==
Luxembourg
3
Nairobi Club, Nairobi, Kenya
12 May 1995
Clay (outdoors)

Estonia
0

			1	2	3
1	(Luxembourg) (Estonia)	Michele Wagner; Liina Suurvarik	7; 5	6; 4
2	(Luxembourg) (Estonia)	Rosabel Moyen; Helina Lill	6; 4	5; 0		retired
3	(Luxembourg) (Estonia)	Rosabel Moyen / Michele Wagner; Helen Laupa / Liina Suurvarik	2; 6	7; 5	6; 4

== Zimbabwe vs. Senegal ==
Zimbabwe
3
Nairobi Club, Nairobi, Kenya
12 May 1995
Clay (outdoors)

Senegal
0

			1	2	3
1	(Zimbabwe) (Senegal)	Alison Vaughan; Assa Berthe	6; 0	6; 0
2	(Zimbabwe) (Senegal)	Julia Muir; Amy Berthe	6; 4	6; 2
3	(Zimbabwe) (Senegal)	Paula Iversen / Alison Vaughan; Amy Berthe / Assa Berthe	4; 6	6; 3	6; 1

== See also ==
- Fed Cup structure
