= Beach volleyball at the 2021 SEA Games – Women's tournament =

Women's beach volleyball at the 2021 Southeast Asian Games
- Venue: Tuần Châu
- Dates: 15–20 May 2022
- Competitors: 24 from 6 nations

Medalists
gold medal	Naraphornrapat–Kongphopsarutawadee; Radarong–Udomchavee	Thailand
silver medal	Dhita–Putu; Nur Atika–Sari	Indonesia
bronze medal	Rondina–Pons; Gonzaga–Rodriguez	Philippines

The women's beach volleyball tournament at the 2021 Southeast Asian Games took place at the Tuần Châu, Quảng Ninh, Vietnam from 15 to 20 May 2022.

== Schedule ==
All times are Vietnam Standard Time (UTC+07:00)

Date	Time	Event
Sunday, 15 May 2022	14:00	Preliminary round
Monday, 16 May 2022	09:00	Preliminary round
Tuesday, 17 May 2022	14:00	Preliminary round
Wednesday, 18 May 2022	09:00	Preliminary round
Thursday, 19 May 2022	14:00	Preliminary round
Friday, 20 May 2022	10:30	Bronze medal match
Friday, 20 May 2022	15:00	Gold medal match

== Seeds ==
Teams were seeded is the preliminary round according to the following draw:

Seed	NOC	Team 1	Team 2
1	Vietnam	Vũ Ngọc Lan Nguyên–Nguyễn Lê Thị Tường Vy	Nguyễn Thị Thanh Trâm–Trương Dương Thị Mỹ Huyền
2	Thailand	Taravadee Naraphornrapat–Worapeerachayakorn Kongphopsarutawadee	Varapatsorn Radarong–Tanarattha Udomchavee
3	Singapore	Kai Yun Alicia Tan–Cecilia Soh Hui Chin	Hui Hui Eliza Chong–Wei Yu Ong
4	Philippines	Sisi Rondina–Bernadeth Pons	Jovelyn Gonzaga–Floremel Rodriguez
5	Indonesia	Dhita Juliana–Putu Dini Jasita Utami	Nur Atika Sari–Sari Hartati
6	Malaysia	Farwizah Aina Ahmad Nizar–Maegan Beh Jia Yin	Foo Sin Xi–Sing Yee Sin

== Results ==
=== Round robin ===
Date		Score		Set 1	Set 2	Set 3
15 May	Tan A.K.Y.–Soh C.H.C. (Singapore)	0–2	(Philippines) Rondina–Pons	14–21	9–21	
15 May	Chong E.H.H.–Ong W.Y. (Singapore)	0–2	(Philippines) Gonzaga–Rodriguez	12–21	8–21	
15 May	Naraphornrapat–Kongphopsarutawadee (Thailand)	2–0	(Indonesia) Dhita–Putu	21–18	21–11	
15 May	Radarong–Udomchavee (Thailand)	2–0	(Indonesia) Nur Atika–Sari	21–11	21–16	
15 May	V.N.L.Nguyên–N.L.T.T.Vy (Vietnam)	2–0	(Malaysia) Aina–Maegan	21–9	21–18	
15 May	N.T.T.Trâm–T.D.T.M.Huyền (Vietnam)	2–0	(Malaysia) Sin Xi–Sing Yee	21–13	21–15	
16 May	Dhita–Putu (Indonesia)	2–0	(Singapore) Tan A.K.Y.–Soh C.H.C.	21–5	21–8	
16 May	Nur Atika–Sari (Indonesia)	2–1	(Singapore) Chong E.H.H.–Ong W.Y.	20–22	25–23	15–8
16 May	V.N.L.Nguyên–N.L.T.T.Vy (Vietnam)	0–2	(Thailand) Naraphornrapat–Kongphopsarutawadee	13–21	12–21	
16 May	N.T.T.Trâm–T.D.T.M.Huyền (Vietnam)	0–2	(Thailand) Radarong–Udomchavee	12–21	11–21	
16 May	Aina–Maegan (Malaysia)	0–2	(Philippines) Rondina–Pons	11–21	9–21	
16 May	Sin Xi–Sing Yee (Malaysia)	0–2	(Philippines) Gonzaga–Rodriguez	14–21	9–21	
17 May	Naraphornrapat–Kongphopsarutawadee (Thailand)	2–0	(Malaysia) Aina–Maegan	21–17	21–10	
17 May	Radarong–Udomchavee (Thailand)	2–0	(Malaysia) Sin Xi–Sing Yee	21–13	21–10	
17 May	Rondina–Pons (Philippines)	0–2	(Indonesia) Dhita–Putu	19–21	17–21	
17 May	Gonzaga–Rodriguez (Philippines)	2–0	(Indonesia) Nur Atika–Sari	21–13	21–19	
17 May	Rondina–Pons (Philippines)	0–2 (GS)	(Indonesia) Dhita–Putu	15–21	19–21	
17 May	Tan A.K.Y.–Soh C.H.C. (Singapore)	0–2	(Vietnam) V.N.L.Nguyen–N.L.T.T Vy	11–21	11–21	
17 May	Chong E.H.H.–Ong W.Y. (Singapore)	1–2	(Vietnam) T.T.T.Tram–Truong	16–21	21–19	12–15
18 May	V.N.L.Nguyên–N.L.T.T.Vy (Vietnam)	0–2	(Philippines) Rondina–Pons	16–21	12–21	
18 May	N.T.T.Trâm–T.D.T.M.Huyền (Vietnam)	0–2	(Philippines) Gonzaga–Rodriguez	13–21	20–22	
18 May	Aina–Maegan (Malaysia)	0–2	(Indonesia) Dhita–Putu	9–21	6–21	
18 May	Sin Xi–Sing Yee (Malaysia)	0–2	(Indonesia) Nur Atika–Sari	20–22	19–21	
18 May	Naraphornrapat–Kongphopsarutawadee (Thailand)	2–0	(Singapore) Tan A.K.Y.–Soh C.H.C.	21–10	21–13	
18 May	Radarong–Udomchavee (Thailand)	2–0	(Singapore) Chong E.H.H.–Ong W.Y.	21–9	21–11	
19 May	Dhita–Putu (Indonesia)	2–0	(Vietnam) V.N.L.Nguyên–N.L.T.T.Vy	21–19	24–22	
19 May	Nur Atika–Sari (Indonesia)	0–2	(Vietnam) N.T.T.Trâm–T.D.T.M.Huyền	15–21	18–21	
19 May	Dhita–Putu (Indonesia)	2–0 (GS)	(Vietnam) V.N.L.Nguyên–N.L.T.T.Vy	23–21	21–13	
19 May	Rondina–Pons (Philippines)	0–2	(Thailand) Naraphornrapat–Kongphopsarutawadee	20–22	15–21	
19 May	Gonzaga–Rodriguez (Philippines)	0–2	(Thailand) Radarong–Udomchavee	18–21	15–21	
19 May	Tan A.K.Y.–Soh C.H.C. (Singapore)	1–2	(Malaysia) Aina–Maegan	22–20	13–21	17–19
19 May	Chong E.H.H.–Ong W.Y. (Singapore)	2–0	(Malaysia) Sin Xi–Sing Yee	21–14	21–14	
19 May	Chong E.H.H.–Ong W.Y. (Singapore)	2–1 (GS)	(Malaysia) Sing Yee–Maegan	21–14	9–21	15–13

=== Knockout round ===
==== Bronze medal match ====
Date		Score		Set 1	Set 2	Set 3
20 May	Rondina–Pons (Philippines)	2–1	(Vietnam) V.N.L.Nguyên–N.L.T.T.Vy	20–22	21–18	15–12
20 May	Gonzaga–Rodriguez (Philippines)	2–0	(Vietnam) N.T.T.Trâm–T.D.T.M.Huyền	21–17	21–16	

==== Gold medal match ====
Date		Score		Set 1	Set 2	Set 3
20 May	Naraphornrapat–Kongphopsarutawadee (Thailand)	2–0	(Indonesia) Dhita–Putu	21–18	21–18	
20 May	Radarong–Udomchavee (Thailand)	2–0	(Indonesia) Nur Atika–Sari	21–8	21–16	

== See also ==
- Men's tournament
