= 2003 Fed Cup Europe/Africa Zone Group II – play-offs =

International tennis competition play-offs

The play-offs of the 2003 Fed Cup Europe/Africa Zone Group II were the final stages of the Group II Zonal Competition involving teams from Europe and Africa. Those that qualified for this stage placed first in their respective pools.

Placing	Pool A	Pool B	Pool C	Pool D
1	Portugal	Greece	Finland	Lithuania
2	Turkey	Latvia	Egypt	Morocco
3	Norway	Algeria	Bosnia and Herzegovina	Malta
4			Botswana	

The four teams were then randomly paired up the team from a different placing of another group for a play-off tie, with the winners being promoted to Group I.

== Lithuania vs. Portugal ==
Lithuania
2
Estoril, Portugal
3 May 2003
Red clay (outdoors)

Portugal
0

			1	2	3
1	(Lithuania) (Portugal)	Lina Stančiūtė; Ana Catarina Nogueira	6; 1	3; 6	6; 2
2	(Lithuania) (Portugal)	Edita Liachovičiūtė; Frederica Piedade	6; 4	6; 4
3	(Lithuania) (Portugal)	Edita Liachovičiūtė / Lina Stančiūtė; Ana Catarina Nogueira / Frederica Piedade				not played

- Lithuania promoted to Group I for 2004, where they were 13th overall and then relegated to Group II for 2005.

== Greece vs. Finland ==
Greece
2
Estoril, Portugal
3 May 2003
Red clay (outdoors)

Finland
1

			1	2	3
1	(Greece) (Finland)	Nikoleta Kipritidou; Essi Laine	6; 1	6; 4
2	(Greece) (Finland)	Christina Zachariadou; Emma Laine	5; 7	5; 7
3	(Greece) (Finland)	Asimina Kaplani / Christina Zachariadou; Emma Laine / Piia Suomalainen	7^{7} 6^{3}	6; 4

- Greece advanced to Group I for 2004, where they came eleventh overall.

== See also ==
- Fed Cup structure
