= 2007 Grand Prix SAR La Princesse Lalla Meryem – Singles =

Tennis tournament

Singles
- 2007 Grand Prix SAR La Princesse Lalla Meryem

Final
- Champion: (Venezuela) Milagros Sequera
- Runner-up: (Canada) Aleksandra Wozniak
- Score: 6–1, 6–3

Events
| Singles | Doubles |
| ← 2006 · | Grand Prix SAR La Princesse Lalla Meryem | · 2008 → |

Meghann Shaughnessy was the defending champion, but chose not to play that year.

Milagros Sequera won the title, defeating Aleksandra Wozniak 6–1, 6–3 in the final.

== Seeds ==
1. (India) Sania Mirza (first round)
2. (France) Virginie Razzano (first round, retired because of a left hip injury)
3. (Russia) Anastasia Rodionova (first round)
4. (United States) Jill Craybas (second round)
5. (United States) Vania King (second round)
6. (France) Camille Pin (quarterfinals)
7. (Luxembourg) Anne Kremer (second round, retired because of a lower back injury)
8. (Slovakia) Jarmila Gajdošová (second round)

== Draw ==
=== Key ===
- Q = Qualifier
- WC = Wild card
- LL = Lucky loser
- Alt = Alternate
- SE = Special exempt
- PR = Protected ranking
- ITF = ITF entry
- JE = Junior exempt
- w/o = Walkover
- r = Retired
- d = Defaulted
- SR = Special ranking

=== Finals ===
Semifinals
Q | (Argentina) María Emilia Salerni | 3 | 4^{r}
(Canada) Aleksandra Wozniak | 6 | 4
Q | (Romania) Ioana Raluca Olaru | 6 | 2 | 6^{5}
(Venezuela) Milagros Sequera | 0 | 6 | 7

Final
(Canada) Aleksandra Wozniak | 1 | 3
(Venezuela) Milagros Sequera | 6 | 6

=== Section 1 ===
First round
1 | (India) S Mirza | 2 | 5
Q | (Argentina) ME Salerni | 6 | 7
(France) Y Fedossova | 6 | 5 | 6
LL | (Russia) A Jidkova | 3 | 7 | 3
(Germany) S Klösel | 6 | 6
WC | (Morocco) N Lalami | 0 | 3
WC | (Morocco) FZ El Allami | 0 | 2
7 | (Luxembourg) A Kremer | 6 | 6
4 | (United States) J Craybas | 6 | 6
(Ukraine) Y Beygelzimer | 4 | 1
(Spain) L Pous Tió | 4 | 1
(Canada) A Wozniak | 6 | 6
PR | (Spain) N Llagostera Vives | 5 | 1
(France) A Cornet | 7 | 6
(Hungary) M Czink | 3 | 6 | 1
8 | (Slovakia) J Gajdošová | 6 | 4 | 6

Second round
Q | (Argentina) ME Salerni | 5 | 6 | 6
(France) Y Fedossova | 7 | 3 | 3
(Germany) S Klösel | 6 | 3
7 | (Luxembourg) A Kremer | 0 | 1^{r}
4 | (United States) J Craybas | 7 | 0 | 3
(Canada) A Wozniak | 6^{2} | 6 | 6
(France) A Cornet | 7 | 4 | 6
8 | (Slovakia) J Gajdošová | 6^{5} | 6 | 3

Quarterfinals
Q | (Argentina) ME Salerni | 6 | 3 | 6
(Germany) S Klösel | 2 | 6 | 4
(Canada) A Wozniak | 6 | 1 | 7
(France) A Cornet | 3 | 6 | 5

Semifinals
Q | (Argentina) ME Salerni | 3 | 4^{r}
(Canada) A Wozniak | 6 | 4

=== Section 2 ===
First round
5 | (United States) V King | 6 | 6
WC | (Morocco) B Mouhtassine | 0 | 1
(Russia) A Kudryavtseva | 5 | 4
Q | (Romania) IR Olaru | 7 | 6
(Denmark) C Wozniacki | 6 | 6
(United States) A Rolle | 3 | 4
LL | (United States) J Ditty | 7 | 7
3 | (Russia) A Rodionova | 5 | 5
6 | (France) C Pin | 6 | 6
(Canada) S Dubois | 1 | 4
(Switzerland) T Bacsinszky | 6 | 6
Q | (Ukraine) O Savchuk | 0 | 3
LL | (United States) N Uberoi | 6 | 6
Q | (Romania) S Cîrstea | 2 | 3
(Venezuela) M Sequera | 3 | 7 | 0
2 | (France) V Razzano | 6 | 6^{7} | 0^{r}

Second round
5 | (United States) V King | 4 | 2
Q | (Romania) IR Olaru | 6 | 6
(Denmark) C Wozniacki | 6 | 6
LL | (United States) J Ditty | 3 | 4
6 | (France) C Pin | 6 | 1 | 7
(Switzerland) T Bacsinszky | 2 | 6 | 6^{1}
LL | (United States) N Uberoi | 4 | 0
(Venezuela) M Sequera | 6 | 6

Quarterfinals
Q | (Romania) IR Olaru | 6 | 6
(Denmark) C Wozniacki | 4 | 4
6 | (France) C Pin | 6^{3} | 4
(Venezuela) M Sequera | 7 | 6

Semifinals
Q | (Romania) IR Olaru | 6 | 2 | 6^{5}
(Venezuela) M Sequera | 0 | 6 | 7
