= 1995 Fed Cup Europe/Africa Zone Group II – Pool A =

International tennis competition

Group A of the 1995 Fed Cup Europe/Africa Zone Group II was one of four pools in the Europe/Africa Zone Group II of the 1995 Fed Cup. Five teams competed in a round robin competition, with the top two teams advancing to the play-offs.

	(Greece) GRE	(Norway) NOR	(Morocco) MAR	(Tunisia) TUN	(Egypt) EGY	Match; W–L	Set; W–L	Game; W–L	Standings
Greece		2–1	3–0	3–0	3–0	4–0	22–3	145–67	1
Norway	1–2		3–0	2–1	3–0	3–1	18–8	145–86	2
Morocco	0–3	0–3		3–0	3–0	2–2	9–12	84–90	3
Tunisia	0–3	1–2	0–3		2–1	1–3	8–14	69–102	4
Egypt	0–3	0–3	0–3	1–2		0–4	2–22	50–138	5

== Greece vs. Norway ==
Greece
2
Nairobi Club, Nairobi, Kenya
8 May 1995
Clay (outdoors)

Norway
1

			1	2	3
1	(Greece) (Norway)	Christina Zachariadou; Amy Jonsson-Råholt	5; 7	2; 6
2	(Greece) (Norway)	Christína Papadáki; Mette Sigmundstad	6; 4	6; 3
3	(Greece) (Norway)	Christína Papadáki / Christina Zachariadou; Amy Jonsson-Råholt / Molly Ulvin	7^{7} 6^{4}	6; 0

== Tunisia vs. Egypt ==
Tunisia
2
Nairobi Club, Nairobi, Kenya
8 May 1995
Clay (outdoors)

Egypt
1

			1	2	3
1	(Tunisia) (Egypt)	Imen Ben Larbi; Shahira Tawfik	1; 6	3; 6
2	(Tunisia) (Egypt)	Selima Sfar; Mehry Shawki	6; 1	6; 0
3	(Tunisia) (Egypt)	Imen Ben Larbi / Selima Sfar; Mehry Shawki / Shahira Tawfik	6; 1	6; 3

== Greece vs. Morocco ==
Greece
2
Nairobi Club, Nairobi, Kenya
9 May 1995
Clay (outdoors)

Morocco
1

			1	2	3
1	(Greece) (Morocco)	Christina Zachariadou; Bahia Mouhtassine	6; 2	6; 2
2	(Greece) (Morocco)	Christína Papadáki; Lamia Alami	6; 0	6; 1
3	(Greece) (Morocco)	Christína Papadáki / Christina Zachariadou; Lamia Alami / Bahia Mouhtassine	7^{7} 6^{4}	6; 1

== Norway vs. Tunisia ==
Norway
2
Nairobi Club, Nairobi, Kenya
9 May 1995
Clay (outdoors)

Tunisia
1

			1	2	3
1	(Norway) (Tunisia)	Amy Jonsson-Råholt; Imen Ben Larbi	6; 0	6; 0
2	(Norway) (Tunisia)	Mette Sigmundstad; Selima Sfar	4; 6	3; 6
3	(Norway) (Tunisia)	Karoline Borgersen / Molly Ulvin; Imen Ben Larbi / Selima Sfar	6; 2	3; 6	6; 2

== Greece vs. Egypt ==
Greece
3
Nairobi Club, Nairobi, Kenya
10 May 1995
Clay (outdoors)

Egypt
0

			1	2	3
1	(Greece) (Egypt)	Christina Zachariadou; Shahira Tawfik	7; 5	6; 1
2	(Greece) (Egypt)	Christína Papadáki; Mehry Shawki	6; 0	6; 1
3	(Greece) (Egypt)	Ariadne Katsouli / Alexandra Rentzoula; Mehry Shawki / Shahira Tawfik	6; 3	6; 4

== Norway vs. Morocco ==
Norway
3
Nairobi Club, Nairobi, Kenya
10 May 1995
Clay (outdoors)

Morocco
0

			1	2	3
1	(Norway) (Morocco)	Karoline Borgersen; Habiba Ifrakh	6; 4	1; 6	6; 0
2	(Norway) (Morocco)	Amy Jonsson-Råholt; Lamia Alami	6; 0	6; 2
3	(Norway) (Morocco)	Mette Sigmundstad / Molly Ulvin; Habiba Ifrakh / Bahia Mouhtassine	7; 5	7^{7} 6^{3}

== Greece vs. Tunisia ==
Greece
3
Nairobi Club, Nairobi, Kenya
11 May 1995
Clay (outdoors)

Tunisia
0

			1	2	3
1	(Greece) (Tunisia)	Christina Zachariadou; Imen Ben Larbi	6; 0	6; 0
2	(Greece) (Tunisia)	Christína Papadáki; Selima Sfar	6; 0	3; 6	6; 3
3	(Greece) (Tunisia)	Ariadne Katsouli / Alexandra Rentzoula; Imen Ben Larbi / Selima Sfar	6; 3	6; 3

== Morocco vs. Egypt ==
Morocco
3
Nairobi Club, Nairobi, Kenya
11 May 1995
Clay (outdoors)

Egypt
0

			1	2	3
1	(Morocco) (Egypt)	Habiba Ifrakh; Dalia El Sheikh	6; 0	6; 2
2	(Morocco) (Egypt)	Bahia Mouhtassine; Shahira Tawfik	6; 2	7; 5
3	(Morocco) (Egypt)	Lamia Alami / Bahia Mouhtassine; Mehry Shawki / Shahira Tawfik	6; 1	6; 0

== Norway vs. Egypt ==
Norway
3
Nairobi Club, Nairobi, Kenya
12 May 1995
Clay (outdoors)

Egypt
0

			1	2	3
1	(Norway) (Egypt)	Karoline Borgersen; Dalia El Sheikh	6; 3	6; 2
2	(Norway) (Egypt)	Amy Jonsson-Råholt; Mehry Shawki	6; 1	6; 1
3	(Norway) (Egypt)	Amy Jonsson-Råholt / Molly Ulvin; Dalia El Sheikh / Mehry Shawki	6; 1	6; 1

== Morocco vs. Tunisia ==
Morocco
3
Nairobi Club, Nairobi, Kenya
12 May 1995
Clay (outdoors)

Tunisia
0

			1	2	3
1	(Morocco) (Tunisia)	Habiba Ifrakh; Imen Ben Larbi	6; 2	6; 2
2	(Morocco) (Tunisia)	Bahia Mouhtassine; Selima Sfar				w/o
3	(Morocco) (Tunisia)	Habiba Ifrakh / Bahia Mouhtassine; Imen Ben Larbi / Selima Sfar				w/o

== See also ==
- Fed Cup structure
