= Golden set =

Tennis set won without losing a point

In tennis, a golden set is a set which is won without losing a single point. This means scoring the 24 minimum points required to win the set 6–0, without conceding any points.

In professional tennis, this has occurred twice in the main draw of top-level events. It has also happened a number of times in the pre-tournament qualifiers of the lowest-level events. Bill Scanlon had a golden second set in his win over Marcos Hocevar at the 1983 Delray Beach WCT event. Yaroslava Shvedova had a golden first set in her win over Sara Errani at the 2012 Wimbledon Championships. Steffi Graf came close to achieving the feat in the finals of the 1989 Virginia Slims of Washington tournament, winning the first five games to love against Zina Garrison, before winning the match 6–1, 7–5. At the 2023 Western & Southern Open, Taylor Fritz won the first five games to love in his round of sixteen match before his opponent, Dusan Lajovic, retired.

A golden match is when a player does not lose a single point in the entire match. There are five documented cases of this at low-level events. Hazel Hotchkiss Wightman did so in the 1910 Washington State Championships, defeating a Miss Huiskamp (first name unknown). Later it happened twice in France in the qualifiers of lowest-level professional events, two of them in the span of two months, both against the same 55-year-old man, Tomas Fabian. A golden match occurred in the qualifiers of an ITF Men's World Tennis Tour event in Doha in 2019, where Krittin Koaykul beat Artem Bahmet. Bahmet was a professional sports bettor who had entered the tournament without having played tennis before; his associate bet against him and won roughly €3,000.

== List of occurrences ==
Key
**W**	F	SF	QF	#R	RR	Q#	DNQ	A	NH

(W) winner; (F) finalist; (SF) semifinalist; (QF) quarterfinalist; (#R) rounds 4, 3, 2, 1; (RR) round-robin stage; (Q#) qualification round; (DNQ) did not qualify; (A) absent; (NH) not held; (SR) strike rate (events won / competed); (W–L) win–loss record.

Main draws of top-level professional events are in boldface.

Player	Event	Round	Opponent	Final score	Date	Notes
(United States) Hazel Hotchkiss	1910 Washington State Championships, Seattle, Washington	SF	(United States) Mrs. Huiskamp (first name unknown)	6–0, 6–3	12 Aug 1910	
(United States) Pauline Betz	1943 Tri-State tournament, Cincinnati, Ohio	F	(United States) Catherine Wolf	6–0, 6–2	1943	
(United States) Bill Scanlon	**1983 Delray Beach WCT**	1R	(Brazil) Marcos Hocevar	6–2, 6–0	22 Feb 1983	Recorded in the Guinness Book of World Records.
(Denmark) Tine Scheuer-Larsen	1995 Fed Cup Europe/Africa Zone	RR	(Botswana) Mmaphala Letsatle	6–0, 6–0	9 May 1995	
(Kazakhstan) Yaroslava Shvedova	**2012 Wimbledon Championships**	3R	(Italy) Sara Errani	6–0, 6–4	30 Jun 2012	Only golden set in main draw of a Major.
(Germany) Julian Reister	2013 US Open qualifying	Q2	(Germany) Tim Pütz	6–7^{(3–7)}, 6–4, 6–0	20 Aug 2013	Only golden set in third set.
(Italy) Stefano Napolitano	2015 Distal & ITR Group Tennis Cup qualifying	Q2	(Italy) Augusto Virgili	6–0, 6–3	7 Jul 2015	
(Ukraine) Katarina Zavatska	2015 Chang ITF Pro Circuit – Bangkok $25,000 qualifying	Q2	(Thailand) Thanyathorn Putthaun	6–0, 6–0	12 Dec 2015	
(China) He Yecong	2016 Qingdao ATP Challenger qualifying	Q2	(China) Wang Honghan	6–0, 6–0	7 Aug 2016	
(France) Benjamin Tullou	2016 France F17 Futures qualifying, Bagnères-de-Bigorre, France	Q1	(Czech Republic) Tomáš Fabián	6–0, 6–0	3 Sep 2016	Golden match.
(France) Joffrey de Schepper	2016 France F23 Futures qualifying, Rodez, France	Q1	(Czech Republic) Tomáš Fabián	6–0, 6–0	15 Oct 2016	Amateur opponent. Fabián won one point, avoiding another golden match against him.
(Venezuela) Luis David Martínez	2017 Morelos Open qualifying	Q1	(Mexico) Manfred Brandes Vogt	6–1, 6–0	18 Feb 2017	
(France) Dan Added	2018 France F5 Futures qualifying, Poitiers, France	Q2	(France) Freddy Prioton	6–0, 6–0	11 Mar 2018	Golden match.
(Thailand) Krittin Koaykul	2019 Doha M15 qualifying, Doha, Qatar	Q1	(Ukraine) Artem Bahmet	6–0, 6–0	8 Dec 2019	Golden match.
(United States) Jessie Aney	2021 W60 San Bartolomé de Tirajana qualifying, Spain	Q1	(France) Heranne Excellent	6–0, 6–0	15 Aug 2021	In the first set.
Anastasia Sysoeva	2022 W25 Naples, Florida qualifying, USA	Q2	(China) Fenni Lian	6–0, 6–0	17 May 2022	In the second set.
(Germany) Emily Seibold	2024 W15 Krško main draw, Slovenia	1R	(Czech Republic) Denise Hrdinkova	6–3, 6–0	16 Jul 2024	

== Real tennis ==
The sport of real tennis, as the ancestor to lawn tennis, has the same scoring system of six-game sets, making it possible to hit a golden set by winning all 24 points.

Player	Event	Round	Opponent	Final score	Date	Notes
(United Kingdom) Claire Fahey (United Kingdom) Tara Lumley	2026 US Open, Boston	QF	(United States) Kathy Minevitz (United States) Julia Knowlton	6–0, 6–0	7 March 2026	In the first set
