= 2006 Grand Prix SAR La Princesse Lalla Meryem =

- Date: 15 – 21 May
- Edition: 6th
- Category: Tier IV
- Draw: 32S / 16D
- Prize money: $145,000
- Surface: Clay / outdoor
- Location: Rabat, Morocco

Champions

Singles
- (United States) Meghann Shaughnessy

Doubles
- (China) Yan Zi / (China) Zheng Jie
- Morocco Open

The 2006 Grand Prix SAR La Princesse Lalla Meryem was a women's tennis tournament played on outdoor clay courts in Rabat, Morocco that was part of the Tier IV category of the 2006 WTA Tour. It was the sixth edition of the tournament and was held from 15 May until 21 May 2006. Unseeded Meghann Shaughnessy won the singles title and earned $22,900 first-prize money.

== Finals ==
=== Singles ===
(United States) Meghann Shaughnessy defeated (Slovakia) Martina Suchá 6–2, 3–6, 6–3

- It was Shaughnessy' 1st singles title of the year and the 4th of her career.

=== Doubles ===
(China) Yan Zi / (China) Zheng Jie defeated (United States) Ashley Harkleroad / (United States) Bethanie Mattek 6–1, 6–3
