= Silvia Disderi =

Italian tennis player

- Country (sports): Italy
- Born: 10 July 1983 (age 42); Biella
- Height: 1.83 m (6 ft 0 in)
- Retired: 2009
- Plays: Right-handed (two-handed backhand)
- Prize money: $69,864

Singles
- Career record: 185–75
- Career titles: 2 ITF
- Highest ranking: No. 329 (13 May 2002)

Doubles
- Career record: 141–96
- Career titles: 12 ITF
- Highest ranking: No. 196 (5 November 2007)

Silvia Disderi (born 10 July 1983) is an Italian former professional tennis player.

== Career ==
Disderi grew up in the northern Italian town of Biella, where she began playing tennis at the age of seven, after being introduced to the sport by her father Sergio. When she was 12, she moved to Turin for training. In 1999, she represented Italy in the World Youth Cup, held in Australia.

=== Professional career ===
A right-handed player, Disderi began competing on the ITF Women's Circuit in 1999. She reached her best singles ranking in 2002, of 329 in the world. As a doubles player, she was ranked as high as No. 196 and won 12 ITF titles. On the WTA Tour, she made most of her main-draw appearances at the Internazionali Femminili di Palermo, featuring three times in either the singles or doubles draw. She was a doubles quarterfinalist at the 2007 Morocco Open.

In 2009, she retired from professional tennis. She lives in Boca Raton, Florida, working as a coach at the Rick Macci Tennis Academy.

== ITF Circuit finals ==
=== Singles: 6 (2–4) ===
Legend $25,000 tournaments $10,000 tournaments	Finals by surface Hard (1–1) Clay (1–3)

Result	No.	Date	Tournament	Surface	Opponent	Score
Win	1	16 February 2003	ITF Albufeira, Portugal	Hard	(France) Sylvia Montero	6–1, 6–1
Loss	1	2 March 2003	ITF Gran Canaria, Spain	Clay	(Spain) Marta Fraga	3–6, 5–7
Win	2	18 May 2003	ITF Casale Monferrato, Italy	Clay	(Croatia) Matea Mezak	6–1, 1–6, 6–2
Loss	2	19 March 2006	ITF Cairo, Egypt	Clay	(Russia) Galina Fokina	5–7, 3–6
Loss	3	20 September 2008	ITF Casale Monferrato, Italy	Clay	(Croatia) Matea Mezak	5–7, 6–2, 1–6
Loss	4	25 October 2008	ITF Oristano, Italy	Hard	(Italy) Giulia Gatto-Monticone	2–6, 2–6

=== Doubles: 25 (12–13) ===
Legend $50,000 tournaments $25,000 tournaments $10,000 tournaments	Finals by surface Hard (6–1) Clay (6–12) Carpet (0–0)

Result	No.	Date	Tournament	Surface	Partner	Opponents	Score
Win	1	1 May 1999	ITF Maglie, Italy	Clay	(Italy) Anna Floris	(Austria) Stefanie Haidner (Argentina) Jorgelina Torti	6–0, 2–6, 6–2
Win	2	15 July 2000	ITF Sezze, Italy	Clay	(Italy) Maria-Letizia Zavagli	(Federal Republic of Yugoslavia) Dina Milosevic (Slovakia) Lenka Tarosková	6–4, 0–6, 7–6^{(4)}
Loss	1	26 August 2000	ITF Cuneo, Italy	Clay	(Italy) Anna Floris	(Italy) Maria-Elena Camerin (Italy) Mara Santangelo	5–7, 2–6
Win	3	1 September 2001	ITF Spoleto, Italy	Clay	(Italy) Anna Floris	(Austria) Stefanie Haidner (Argentina) Luciana Masante	6–4, 7–5
Loss	2	24 November 2001	ITF Mallorca, Spain	Clay	(Italy) Anna Floris	(Austria) Daniela Klemenschits (Austria) Sandra Klemenschits	5–7, 4–6
Loss	3	1 December 2001	ITF Mallorca, Spain	Clay	(Italy) Anna Floris	(Austria) Daniela Klemenschits (Austria) Sandra Klemenschits	3–6, 4–6
Win	4	16 February 2002	ITF Bergamo, Italy	Hard (i)	(Austria) Stefanie Haidner	(Czech Republic) Zuzana Hejdová (Czech Republic) Renata Kučerová	7–5, 6–3
Loss	4	16 March 2002	ITF Makarska, Croatia	Clay	(Czech Republic) Zuzana Hejdová	(Slovenia) Tina Hergold (Israel) Yevgenia Savransky	3–6, 5–7
Loss	5	30 March 2002	ITF Rome, Italy	Clay	(Federal Republic of Yugoslavia) Milica Koprivica	(Italy) Claudia Ivone (Russia) Dinara Safina	4–6, 3–6
Win	5	24 August 2002	ITF Civitanova, Italy	Clay	(Romania) Oana-Elena Golimbioschi	(Italy) Nicole Clerico (Russia) Irina Smirnova	6–3, 6–2
Loss	6	1 September 2002	ITF Spoleto, Italy	Clay	(Austria) Stefanie Haidner	(Italy) Alice Canepa (Italy) Emily Stellato	2–6, 2–6
Win	6	8 February 2003	ITF Vale do Lobo, Portugal	Hard	(Italy) Giulia Meruzzi	(Italy) Giorgia Mortello (Croatia) Ivana Višić	6–0, 6–2
Win	7	15 February 2003	ITF Albufeira, Portugal	Hard	(Italy) Giulia Meruzzi	(France) Kildine Chevalier (United Kingdom) Anna Hawkins	6–2, 6–4
Loss	7	29 March 2003	ITF Rome, Italy	Clay	(Italy) Giulia Meruzzi	(Italy) Alice Canepa (Italy) Emily Stellato	3–6, 1–6
Win	8	2 August 2003	ITF Gardone Val Trompia, Italy	Clay	(France) Kildine Chevalier	(Austria) Daniela Klemenschits (Austria) Sandra Klemenschits	6–4, 6–2
Loss	8	12 June 2004	ITF Alcobaça, Portugal	Hard	(Italy) Krizia Borgarello	(Jamaica) Alanna Broderick (Jamaica) Megan Moulton-Levy	5–7, 1–6
Win	9	11 June 2005	ITF Nazaré, Portugal	Hard	(Brazil) Joana Cortez	(Turkey) Pemra Özgen (Georgia (country)) Nana Urotadze	6–7^{(3)}, 6–1, 6–4
Loss	9	15 July 2005	ITF Monteroni, Italy	Clay	(Italy) Giorgia Mortello	(Italy) Giulia Meruzzi (Italy) Verdiana Verardi	6–7^{(4)}, 6–7^{(1)}
Win	10	20 August 2005	ITF Jesi, Italy	Hard	(Italy) Giulia Gabba	(New Zealand) Leanne Baker (Italy) Francesca Lubiani	6–2, 2–6, 6–4
Loss	10	2 September 2005	ITF Vittoria, Italy	Clay	(Italy) Giorgia Mortello	(United States) Lauren Fisher (Spain) Carla Suárez Navarro	2–6, 3–6
Win	11	18 March 2006	ITF Cairo, Egypt	Clay	(Poland) Olga Brozda	(Ukraine) Kateryna Avdiyenko (Belarus) Iryna Kuryanovich	6–3, 6–1
Loss	11	19 May 2006	ITF Caserta, Italy	Clay	(Italy) Valentina Sulpizio	(Czech Republic) Petra Cetkovská (Czech Republic) Sandra Záhlavová	2–6, 0–6
Loss	12	18 November 2006	ITF Deauville, France	Clay (i)	(Israel) Tzipi Obziler	(Ukraine) Yuliya Beygelzimer (Czech Republic) Yuliana Fedak	5–7, 4–6
Loss	13	11 May 2007	ITF Rabat, Morocco	Clay	(Algeria) Samia Medjahdi	(Romania) Mihaela Buzărnescu (Austria) Melanie Klaffner	4–6, 1–6
Win	12	24 October 2008	ITF Oristano, Italy	Hard	(Italy) Giulia Gatto-Monticone	(Italy) Alice Balducci (Italy) Elisa Salis	6–0, 6–2
