= 2005 Grand Prix SAR La Princesse Lalla Meryem =

- Date: 2 – 8 May
- Edition: 5th
- Category: Tier IV
- Draw: 32S / 16D
- Prize money: $140,000
- Surface: Clay / outdoor
- Location: Rabat, Morocco

Champions

Singles
- (Spain) Nuria Llagostera Vives

Doubles
- (France) Émilie Loit / (Czech Republic) Barbora Strýcová
- Morocco Open

The 2005 Grand Prix SAR La Princesse Lalla Meryem was a women's tennis tournament played on outdoor clay courts in Rabat, Morocco that was part of the Tier IV category of the 2005 WTA Tour. It was the fifth edition of the tournament and was held from 2 May until 8 May 2005. Second-seeded Nuria Llagostera Vives won the singles title and earned $22,000 first-prize money.

== Finals ==
=== Singles ===
(Spain) Nuria Llagostera Vives defeated (China) Zheng Jie 6–4, 6–2

- It was Llagostera Vives' first singles title of her career.

=== Doubles ===
(France) Émilie Loit / (Czech Republic) Barbora Strýcová defeated (Spain) Lourdes Domínguez Lino / (Spain) Nuria Llagostera Vives 3–6, 7–6^{(7–5)}, 7–5
