= Catherine Wolf =

American tennis player (1908–1969)

Catherine Wolfe
- Full name: Catherine E. Wolf
- Country (sports): United States
- Born: August 23, 1908 United States
- Died: July 20, 1969 (aged 60) United States
- Turned pro: 1929 (amateur tour)
- Retired: 1944

Singles

Grand Slam singles results
- US Open: 3R (1936, 1943)

Catherine E. Wolf (August 23, 1908 – July 20, 1969) was an American amateur tennis player in the 1920s and 1930s. She was born in Jasper, Missouri.

Wolf was ranked the number 10 women's tennis player in the United States in 1934 and 1935.

== Career ==
In 1929 at the Michigan State Championship, Wolf won the doubles title, and she was a singles finalist. In 1930, she won the singles titles at the Western Championships and the Illinois State Championship, and she was a doubles finalist (with Eugenie Sampson) in the doubles of the Western Championship.

In 1931, Wolf won the singles title at the Western States Championships. She also was the singles finalist in the Western States Indoor Championships in 1932 and 1934.

At the Tri-State Championships in Cincinnati, Wolf made eight appearances in the finals, winning five titles. She won the singles and doubles titles in 1942 and 1939, and she won the doubles title in 1936. Wolf reached the singles and doubles finals in 1943 and the mixed doubles final in 1942.

Wolf was a teacher who taught in South Bend, Indiana schools, teaching health and physical education. She died of a heart attack while playing tennis in South Bend on July 20, 1969, at age 60.
