= Tine Scheuer-Larsen =

Danish tennis player

- Country (sports): Denmark
- Born: 13 March 1966 (age 60) Ølstykke, Denmark
- Height: 1.70 m (5 ft 7 in)
- Turned pro: 1981
- Retired: 1994
- Prize money: $334,821

Singles
- Career record: 159-135
- Career titles: 0
- Highest ranking: No. 34 (29 September 1986)

Grand Slam singles results
- Australian Open: 1R (1984, 1990)
- French Open: 4R (1985)
- Wimbledon: 2R (1986, 1987, 1989)
- US Open: 3R (1986)

Doubles
- Career record: 144-102
- Career titles: 7
- Highest ranking: No. 14 (10 October 1988)

Grand Slam doubles results
- Australian Open: 1R (1990)
- French Open: QF (1989)
- Wimbledon: 3R (1988)
- US Open: 3R (1984, 1988)

Grand Slam mixed doubles results
- French Open: SF (1987)
- Wimbledon: QF (1987)
- US Open: QF (1986)

Tine Scheuer-Larsen (born 13 March 1966) is a retired tennis player from Denmark.

She became Danish Champion in singles in 1981 age 15 as the youngest Danish player ever at the time. She also became the highest ranked Danish female player on 29 September 1986, when she became the number 34 of the world. Both records were broken by Caroline Wozniacki in 2004 and 2008 respectively. She became a professional in 1980 and retired in 1994, having won seven doubles titles on the WTA Tour.

Scheuer-Larsen is also one of four players to record a golden set in the professional era. In the 1995 Fed Cup Europe/Africa Zone, she achieved a golden set against Mmaphala Letsatle. She went on to win the match 6–0, 6–0.

== Career finals ==
=== Singles (1 runner-up) ===
Result	No.	Date	Tournament	Surface	Opponent	Score
Loss	1.	Apr 1986	Charleston, US	Clay	(United States) Elise Burgin	1–6, 3–6

=== Doubles (7-7) ===
Result	No.	Date	Tournament	Surface	Partner	Opponents	Score
Loss	1.	Oct 1985	Filderstadt, Germany	Hard	(Sweden) Carina Karlsson	(Czechoslovakia) Hana Mandlíková (United States) Pam Shriver	2–6, 1–6
Loss	2.	Jul 1986	Bregenz, Austria	Clay	(Socialist Federal Republic of Yugoslavia) Sabrina Goleš	(Austria) Petra Huber (Germany) Petra Keppeler	2–6, 4–6
Loss	3.	Oct 1986	Hilversum, Netherlands	Carpet (i)	(France) Catherine Tanvier	(United States) Kathy Jordan (Czechoslovakia) Helena Suková	5–7, 1–6
Loss	4.	Oct 1986	Brighton, England	Carpet	(France) Catherine Tanvier	(Germany) Steffi Graf (Czechoslovakia) Helena Suková	4–6, 4–6
Win	5.	Apr 1987	Charleston, US	Clay	(Peru) Laura Gildemeister	(Argentina) Mercedes Paz (United States) Candy Reynolds	6–4, 6–4
Loss	6.	May 1987	Berlin, Germany	Ckay	(Sweden) Catarina Lindqvist	(Germany) Claudia Kohde Kilsch (Czechoslovakia) Helena Suková	1–6, 2–6
Win	7.	Aug 1987	Båstad, Sweden	Clay	(United States) Penny Barg	(Italy) Sandra Cecchini (Argentina) Patricia Tarabini	6–1, 6–2
Loss	8.	Oct 1987	Brighton, England	Carpet (i)	(France) Catherine Tanvier	(United States) Kathy Jordan (Czechoslovakia) Helena Suková	5–7, 1–6
Loss	9.	Feb 1988	Oklahoma City, US	Hard	(Sweden) Catarina Lindqvist	(Czechoslovakia) Jana Novotná (France) Catherine Suire	4–6, 4–6
Win	10.	Jul 1988	Brussels, Belgium	Clay	(Argentina) Mercedes Paz	(Bulgaria) Katerina Maleeva (Italy) Raffaella Reggi	7–6, 6–1
Win	11.	Jul 1988	Hamburg, Germany	Clay	(Czechoslovakia) Jana Novotná	(Germany) Andrea Betzner (Austria) Judith Wiesner	6–4, 6–2
Win	12.	Apr 1989	Barcelona, Spain	Clay	(Czechoslovakia) Jana Novotná	(Spain) Arantxa Sánchez (Austria) Judith Wiesner	6–2, 2–6, 7–6
Win	13.	Jul 1989	Båstad, Sweden	Clay	(Argentina) Mercedes Paz	(Socialist Federal Republic of Yugoslavia) Sabrina Goleš (Bulgaria) Katerina Maleeva	6–2, 7–5
Win	14.	Jul 1990	Båstad, Sweden	Clay	(Argentina) Mercedes Paz	(Netherlands) Carin Bakkum (Netherlands) Nicole Jagerman	6–3, 6–7, 6–2

== ITF finals ==
=== Singles (6–0) ===
Legend
$10,000 tournaments

Result	No.	Date	Tournament	Surface	Opponent	Score
Win	1.	22 August 1983	Herne, West Germany	Clay	(West Germany) Andrea Betzner	6–2, 6–2
Win	2.	5 September 1983	Bad Hersf, West Germany	Clay	(Sweden) Stina Almgren	6–0, 6–1
Win	3.	12 September 1983	Dachau, West Germany	Clay	(Switzerland) Annemarie Rüegg	7–5, 6–1
Win	4.	19 September 1983	Rottweil, West Germany	Clay	(Italy) Patrizia Murgo	6–3, 6–4
Win	5.	5 December 1983	Stockholm, Sweden	Clay	(United States) Heather Crowe	6–1, 6–3
Win	6.	13 February 1989	Hørsholm, Denmark	Carpet	(Norway) Amy Jönsson Raaholt	6–0, 6–3

=== Doubles (4–2) ===
Result	No.	Date	Tournament	Surface	Partner	Opponents	Score
Win	1.	4 April 1983	Caserta, Italy	Clay	(Sweden) Helena Olsson	(Italy) Anna Iuale (Czechoslovakia) Lea Plchová	6–2, 6–3
Loss	2.	22 August 1983	Herne, West Germany	Clay	(Sweden) Maria Lindström	(Sweden) Berit Björk (West Germany) Karin Schultz	4–6, 3–6
Loss	3.	5 September 1983	Bad Hersf, West Germany	Clay	(Sweden) Maria Lindström	(West Germany) Karin Schultz (Sweden) Mimmi Wikstedt	0–6, 5–7
Win	4.	17 October 1983	Ashkelon, Israel	Hard	(Sweden) Maria Lindström	(Israel) Rafeket Benjamini (Israel) Orly Bialostocky	6–0, 6–3
Win	5.	13 February 1989	Hørsholm, Denmark	Carpet	(Denmark) Lone Vandborg	(United States) Vincenza Procacci (United States) Anne-Marie Walson	6–1, 7–5
Win	6.	9 February 1992	Hørsholm, Denmark	Carpet (i)	(Denmark) Sofie Albinus	(Belgium) Katrien de Craemer (Belgium) Nancy Feber	6–3, 6–4

== Records ==
Tournament	Year	Record accomplished	Player tied
Fed Cup Europe/Africa Zone	1995	Achieved a Golden Set	Pauline Betz (1943) Yaroslava Shvedova (2012)
