= 1995 Fed Cup Europe/Africa Zone Group II – Pool C =

International tennis competition

Group C of the 1995 Fed Cup Europe/Africa Zone Group II was one of four pools in the Europe/Africa Zone Group II of the 1995 Fed Cup. Five teams competed in a round robin competition, with the top two teams advancing to the play-offs.

	(Denmark) DEN	(North Macedonia) MKD	(Turkey) TUR	(Lithuania) LIT	(Botswana) BOT	Match; W–L	Set; W–L	Game; W–L	Standings
Denmark		3–0	3–0	3–0	3–0	4–0	24–2	148–46	1
Macedonia	0–3		2–1	2–1	3–0	3–1	15–11	122–109	2
Turkey	0–3	1–2		1–1	3–0	1–2	12–13	114–114	3
Lithuania	0–3	1–2	1–1		3–0	1–2	11–13	90–139	4
Botswana	0–3	0–3	0–3	0–3		0–4	1–18	48–148	5

== Denmark vs. Turkey ==
Denmark
3
Nairobi Club, Nairobi, Kenya
8 May 1995
Clay (outdoors)

Turkey
0

			1	2	3
1	(Denmark) (Turkey)	Sandra Olsen; Duygu Akşit Oal	6; 4	6; 0
2	(Denmark) (Turkey)	Karin Ptaszek; Stela Penciu	6; 1	6; 3
3	(Denmark) (Turkey)	Karin Ptaszek / Tine Scheuer-Larsen; Duygu Akşit Oal / Stela Penciu	0; 6	6; 2	6; 2

== Macedonia vs. Lithuania ==
Macedonia
2
Nairobi Club, Nairobi, Kenya
8 May 1995
Clay (outdoors)

Lithuania
1

			1	2	3
1	(North Macedonia) (Lithuania)	Irena Mihailova; Odeta Naujokaitė	4; 6	4; 6
2	(North Macedonia) (Lithuania)	Ivona Mihailova; Rūta Deduraitė	6; 4	6; 1
3	(North Macedonia) (Lithuania)	Irena Mihailova / Ivona Mihailova; Rūta Deduraitė / Odeta Naujokaitė	6; 3	6; 4

== Denmark vs. Botswana ==
Denmark
3
Nairobi Club, Nairobi, Kenya
9 May 1995
Clay (outdoors)

Botswana
0

			1	2	3
1	(Denmark) (Botswana)	Tine Scheuer-Larsen; Mmaphala Letsatle	6; 0	6; 0
2	(Denmark) (Botswana)	Karin Ptaszek; Gaobolae Seleka	6; 0	6; 0
3	(Denmark) (Botswana)	Charlotte Aagaard / Sandra Olsen; Lebogang Seitshiro / Gaobolae Seleka	6; 0	6; 0

== Macedonia vs. Turkey ==
Macedonia
2
Nairobi Club, Nairobi, Kenya
9 May 1995
Clay (outdoors)

Turkey
1

			1	2	3
1	(North Macedonia) (Turkey)	Irena Mihailova; Duygu Akşit Oal	6; 4	6; 1
2	(North Macedonia) (Turkey)	Ivona Mihailova; Stela Penciu	6; 3	6; 2
3	(North Macedonia) (Turkey)	Irena Mihailova / Ivona Mihailova; Duygu Akşit Oal / Yasmin Kaya	5; 7	6^{13} 7^{15}

== Turkey vs. Botswana ==
Turkey
3
Nairobi Club, Nairobi, Kenya
10 May 1995
Clay (outdoors)

Botswana
0

			1	2	3
1	(Turkey) (Botswana)	Yasmin Kaya; Mmaphala Letsatle	7; 5	6; 2
2	(Turkey) (Botswana)	Stela Penciu; Gaobolae Seleka	6; 4	6; 2
3	(Turkey) (Botswana)	Duygu Akşit Oal / Stela Penciu; Lebogang Seitshiro / Gaobolae Seleka	6; 0	6; 0

== Denmark vs. Lithuania ==
Denmark
3
Nairobi Club, Nairobi, Kenya
10 May 1995
Clay (outdoors)

Lithuania
0

			1	2	3
1	(Denmark) (Lithuania)	Tine Scheuer-Larsen; Odeta Naujokaitė	6; 1	6; 0
2	(Denmark) (Lithuania)	Karin Ptaszek; Rūta Deduraitė	6; 2	6; 3
3	(Denmark) (Lithuania)	Charlotte Aagaard / Sandra Olsen; Rūta Deduraitė / Gabriele Masiliunaitė	6; 3	6; 3

== Denmark vs. Macedonia ==
Denmark
3
Nairobi Club, Nairobi, Kenya
11 May 1995
Clay (outdoors)

Macedonia
0

			1	2	3
1	(Denmark) (North Macedonia)	Tine Scheuer-Larsen; Irena Mihailova	6; 4	6; 0
2	(Denmark) (North Macedonia)	Karin Ptaszek; Ivona Mihailova	4; 6	6; 4	6; 1
3	(Denmark) (North Macedonia)	Karin Ptaszek / Tine Scheuer-Larsen; Irena Mihailova / Ivona Mihailova	6; 0	6; 1

== Lithuania vs. Botswana ==
Lithuania
3
Nairobi Club, Nairobi, Kenya
11 May 1995
Clay (outdoors)

Botswana
0

			1	2	3
1	(Lithuania) (Botswana)	Odeta Naujokaitė; Mmaphala Letsatle	6; 2	6; 4
2	(Lithuania) (Botswana)	Rūta Deduraitė; Gaobolae Seleka	6; 3	6; 1
3	(Lithuania) (Botswana)	Rūta Deduraitė / Gabriele Masiliunaitė; Lebogang Seitshiro / Bontshetse Seleka	6; 3	6; 1

== Macedonia vs. Botswana ==
Macedonia
3
Nairobi Club, Nairobi, Kenya
12 May 1995
Clay (outdoors)

Botswana
0

			1	2	3
1	(North Macedonia) (Botswana)	Irena Mihailova; Mmaphala Letsatle	6; 4	6; 1
2	(North Macedonia) (Botswana)	Ivona Mihailova; Gaobolae Seleka	6; 1	6; 2
3	(North Macedonia) (Botswana)	Murjana Boskova / Irena Mihailova; Mmaphala Letsatle / Gaobolae Seleka	3; 6	6; 4	6; 3

== Turkey vs. Lithuania ==
Turkey
1
Nairobi Club, Nairobi, Kenya
12 May 1995
Clay (outdoors)

Lithuania
1

			1	2	3
1	(Turkey) (Lithuania)	Duygu Akşit Oal; Odeta Naujokaitė	7^{8} 6^{6}	2; 6	2; 6
2	(Turkey) (Lithuania)	Stela Penciu; Rūta Deduraitė	7^{7} 6^{4}	6^{2} 7^{7}	6; 4
3	(Turkey) (Lithuania)	Duygu Akşit Oal / Stela Penciu; Rūta Deduraitė / Gabriele Masiliunaitė				not played

== See also ==
- Fed Cup structure
