= 1995 Fed Cup Europe/Africa Zone Group II – Pool D =

International tennis competition

Group D of the 1995 Fed Cup Europe/Africa Zone Group II was one of four pools in the Europe/Africa Zone Group II of the 1995 Fed Cup. Five teams competed in a round robin competition, with the top two teams advancing to the play-offs.

	(Republic of Ireland) IRL	(Federal Republic of Yugoslavia) YUG	(Malta) MLT	(Kenya) KEN	(Cyprus) CYP	Match; W–L	Set; W–L	Game; W–L	Standings
Ireland		2–1	3–0	3–0	3–0	4–0	22–4	146–75	1
Yugoslavia	1–2		3–0	3–0	3–0	3–1	22–4	148–52	2
Malta	0–3	0–3		3–0	3–0	2–2	12–12	97–90	3
Kenya	0–3	0–3	0–3		2–1	1–3	2–23	61–137	4
Cyprus	0–3	0–3	0–3	1–2		0–4	2–23	51–149	5

== Ireland vs. Cyprus ==
Ireland
3
Nairobi Club, Nairobi, Kenya
8 May 1995
Clay (outdoors)

Cyprus
0

			1	2	3
1	(Republic of Ireland) (Cyprus)	Claire Curran; Anna Anastasiou	6; 2	6; 1
2	(Republic of Ireland) (Cyprus)	Gina Niland; Nicoletta Pericleous	6; 1	6; 1
3	(Republic of Ireland) (Cyprus)	Claire Curran / Lesley O'Halloran; Anna Anastasiou / Eleni Pilava Papanikolaou	6; 1	6; 1

== Yugoslavia vs. Kenya ==
Yugoslavia
3
Nairobi Club, Nairobi, Kenya
8 May 1995
Clay (outdoors)

Kenya
0

			1	2	3
1	(Federal Republic of Yugoslavia) (Kenya)	Dragana Zarić; Ambreen Rana	6; 0	6; 0
2	(Federal Republic of Yugoslavia) (Kenya)	Katarina Mišić; Phyllis Wilunda	6; 1	6; 3
3	(Federal Republic of Yugoslavia) (Kenya)	Dragana Ilić / Dragana Zarić; Florence Mbugua / Phyllis Wilunda	6; 1	6; 1

== Ireland vs. Kenya ==
Ireland
3
Nairobi Club, Nairobi, Kenya
9 May 1995
Clay (outdoors)

Kenya
0

			1	2	3
1	(Republic of Ireland) (Kenya)	Claire Curran; Shaila Ali	6; 2	6; 1
2	(Republic of Ireland) (Kenya)	Gina Niland; Phyllis Wilunda	6; 0	6; 0
3	(Republic of Ireland) (Kenya)	Karen Nugent / Lesley O'Halloran; Florence Mbugua / Phyllis Wilunda	6; 3	6; 3

== Yugoslavia vs. Malta ==
Yugoslavia
3
Nairobi Club, Nairobi, Kenya
9 May 1995
Clay (outdoors)

Malta
0

			1	2	3
1	(Federal Republic of Yugoslavia) (Malta)	Branislava Ivanović; Helen Asciak	6; 1	6; 0
2	(Federal Republic of Yugoslavia) (Malta)	Katarina Mišić; Lisa Camenzuli	6; 0	6; 2
3	(Federal Republic of Yugoslavia) (Malta)	Dragana Ilić / Dragana Zarić; Helen Asciak / Lisa Camenzuli	6; 1	6; 2

== Yugoslavia vs. Cyprus ==
Yugoslavia
3
Nairobi Club, Nairobi, Kenya
10 May 1995
Clay (outdoors)

Cyprus
0

			1	2	3
1	(Federal Republic of Yugoslavia) (Cyprus)	Branislava Ivanović; Eleni Pilava Papanikolaou	6; 1	6; 1
2	(Federal Republic of Yugoslavia) (Cyprus)	Dragana Zarić; Anna Anastasiou	6; 2	6; 0
3	(Federal Republic of Yugoslavia) (Cyprus)	Dragana Ilić / Dragana Zarić; Anna Anastasiou / Eleni Pilava Papanikolaou	6; 1	6; 0

== Malta vs. Kenya ==
Malta
3
Nairobi Club, Nairobi, Kenya
10 May 1995
Clay (outdoors)

Kenya
0

			1	2	3
1	(Malta) (Kenya)	Helen Asciak; Ambreen Rana	6; 1	6; 0
2	(Malta) (Kenya)	Lisa Camenzuli; Phyllis Wilunda	6; 2	6; 2
3	(Malta) (Kenya)	Helen Asciak / Lisa Camenzuli; Florence Mbugua / Phyllis Wilunda	6; 1	6; 0

== Ireland vs. Yugoslavia ==
Ireland
2
Nairobi Club, Nairobi, Kenya
11 May 1995
Clay (outdoors)

Yugoslavia
1

			1	2	3
1	(Republic of Ireland) (Federal Republic of Yugoslavia)	Lesley O'Halloran; Dragana Zarić	1; 6	0; 6
2	(Republic of Ireland) (Federal Republic of Yugoslavia)	Karen Nugent; Katarina Mišić	6; 3	4; 6	6; 2
3	(Republic of Ireland) (Federal Republic of Yugoslavia)	Karen Nugent / Lesley O'Halloran; Dragana Ilić / Dragana Zarić	6^{3} 7^{7}	7^{7} 6^{5}	6; 4

== Malta vs. Cyprus ==
Malta
3
Nairobi Club, Nairobi, Kenya
11 May 1995
Clay (outdoors)

Cyprus
0

			1	2	3
1	(Malta) (Cyprus)	Helen Asciak; Eleni Pilava Papanikolaou	6; 1	6; 3
2	(Malta) (Cyprus)	Lisa Camenzuli; Anna Anastasiou	6; 1	6; 1
3	(Malta) (Cyprus)	Helen Asciak / Sarah Wetz; Anna Anastasiou / Eleni Pilava Papanikolaou	6; 0	6; 4

== Ireland vs. Malta ==
Ireland
3
Nairobi Club, Nairobi, Kenya
12 May 1995
Clay (outdoors)

Malta
0

			1	2	3
1	(Republic of Ireland) (Malta)	Claire Curran; Helen Asciak	7^{8} 6^{6}	6; 0
2	(Republic of Ireland) (Malta)	Karen Nugent; Lisa Camenzuli	6; 2	7^{7} 6^{0}
3	(Republic of Ireland) (Malta)	Claire Curran / Lesley O'Halloran; Lisa Camenzuli / Sarah Wetz	6; 3	6; 2

== Kenya vs. Cyprus ==
Kenya
2
Nairobi Club, Nairobi, Kenya
12 May 1995
Clay (outdoors)

Cyprus
1

			1	2	3
1	(Kenya) (Cyprus)	Shaila Ali; Anna Anastasiou	6; 3	6; 4
2	(Kenya) (Cyprus)	Phyllis Wilunda; Nicoletta Pericleous	7; 5	6; 2
3	(Kenya) (Cyprus)	Florence Mbugua / Phyllis Wilunda; Nicoletta Pericleous / Eleni Pilava Papanikolaou	6; 2	4; 6	6^{4} 7^{7}

== See also ==
- Fed Cup structure
