= Sinéad Lohan (tennis) =

Irish tennis player

Sinead Lohan
- Country (sports): Ireland
- Born: 10 February 1995 (age 30) Waterford, Ireland
- College: University of Miami
- Prize money: $8,440

Singles
- Career record: 41–18
- Career titles: 2 ITF
- Highest ranking: 748 (9 October 2017)
- Current ranking: 1424 (24 October 2022)

Doubles
- Career record: 1–3
- Career titles: 0
- Last updated on: 4 September 2020.

Sinead Lohan (born 10 February 1995) is an Irish tennis player.

Lohan has won two ITF singles titles in her career, and has achieved a career-high singles ranking of 748 in October 2017. She made her debut for the Ireland Fed Cup team in 2011, and has a win–loss record of 10–5.

Lohan was a student at the University of Miami. She ended the 2016 season ranked 8th best collegiate player in the US.

== ITF Circuit finals ==
=== Singles: 3 (2 titles, 1 runner-up) ===
Legend $100,000 tournaments $80,000 tournaments $60,000 tournaments $25,000 tournaments $15,000 tournaments $10,000 tournaments	Finals by surface Hard (0–0) Clay (0–0) Grass (0–0) Carpet (2–1)

Result	No.	Date	Tier	Tournament	Surface	Opponent	Score
Win	1.	26 June 2016	10,000	ITF Cantanhede, Portugal	Carpet	(Argentina) Victoria Bosio	6–3, 7–5
Win	2.	16 July 2017	15,000	ITF Cantanhede, Portugal	Carpet	(United Kingdom) Alicia Barnett	6–2, 4–6, 6–1
Loss	1.	29 July 2017	15,000	ITF Dublin, Ireland	Carpet	(United Kingdom) Jodie Burrage	6–7^{(5)}, 4–6
