= Ilona Poljakova =

Estonian tennis player

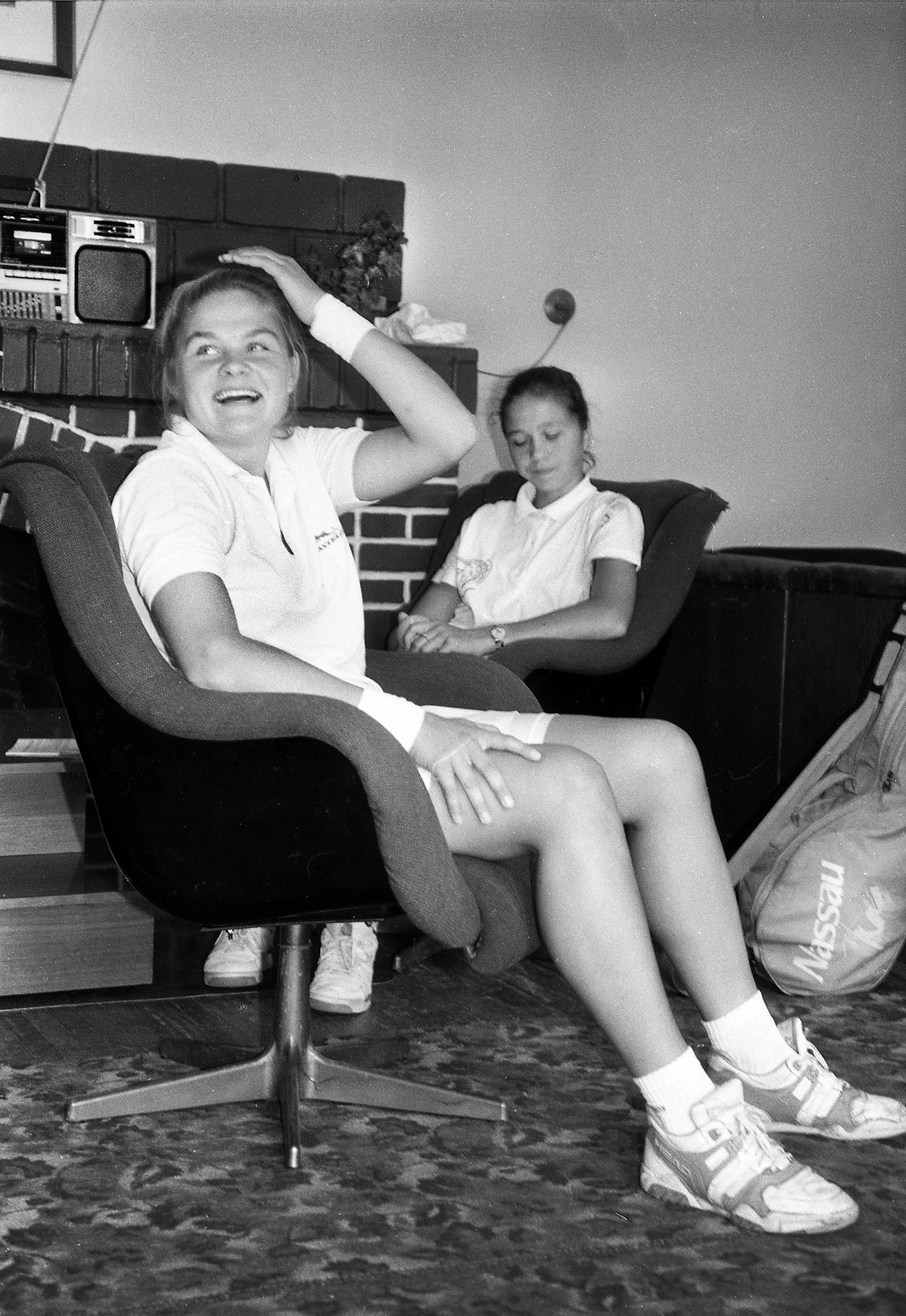
- Country (sports): Estonia
- Born: 1 April 1973 (age 53) Pärnu, then part of Estonian SSR, Soviet Union
- Height: 1.73 m (5 ft 8 in)
- Prize money: $16,867

Singles
- Career record: 65–75
- Career titles: 0
- Highest ranking: No. 430 (7 August 2000)

Doubles
- Career record: 27–47
- Career titles: 1 ITF
- Highest ranking: No. 422 (5 November 2001)

Ilona Poljakova (born 1 April 1973) is an Estonian former professional tennis player.

Born and raised in Pärnu, Poljakova studied at Virginia Commonwealth University in the United States, where she played collegiate tennis before joining the professional tour. She was a member of the Estonia Fed Cup team between 1999 and 2005, appearing in a total of 11 ties, for two singles and four doubles wins.

After retiring from the professional tennis, Poljakova became a beach tennis player.

== ITF finals ==
=== Singles: 3 (0–3) ===
Result	No.	Date	Tournament	Surface	Opponent	Score
Loss	1.	12 September 1999	ITF Bad Saulgau, Germany	Clay	(Germany) Susi Lohrmann	0–6, 0–6
Loss	2.	9 September 2001	ITF Pétange, Luxembourg	Clay	(Germany) Nicole Seitenbecher	2–6, 6–3, 2–6
Loss	3.	7 July 2002	ITF Amsterdam, Netherlands	Clay	(Germany) Nicole Seitenbecher	7–6^{(5)}, 6–7^{(1)}, 4–6

=== Doubles: 3 (1–2) ===
Result	No.	Date	Tournament	Surface	Partner	Opponents	Score
Loss	1.	9 May 1999	ITF Swansea, Great Britain	Clay	(Ukraine) Anna Zaporozhanova	(United Kingdom) Lydia Perkins (United Kingdom) Julia Smith	1–6, 4–6
Win	1.	19 November 2000	ITF Le Havre, France	Clay	(Bulgaria) Biljana Pawlowa-Dimitrova	(China) Lui Li Shen (Romania) Alexandra Zotta	4–0, 4–1, 4–1
Loss	2.	17 February 2002	ITF Kaunas, Lithuania	Hard	(Estonia) Margit Rüütel	(Russia) Daria Chemarda (Russia) Irina Kotkina	0–6, 3–6
