= 2007 Grand Prix SAR La Princesse Lalla Meryem =

- Date: 14 – 20 May
- Edition: 7th
- Category: Tier IV
- Draw: 32S / 16D
- Prize money: $145,000
- Surface: Clay / outdoor
- Location: Fés, Morocco

Champions

Singles
- (Venezuela) Milagros Sequera

Doubles
- (United States) Vania King / (India) Sania Mirza
- Morocco Open

The 2007 Grand Prix SAR La Princesse Lalla Meryem was a women's tennis tournament played on outdoor clay courts in Fés, Morocco that was part of the Tier IV category of the 2007 WTA Tour. It was the seventh edition of the tournament and was held from 14 May until 20 May 2007. Unseeded Milagros Sequera won the singles title.

== Finals ==
=== Singles ===
(Venezuela) Milagros Sequera defeated (Canada) Aleksandra Wozniak 6–1, 6–3

- It was the only WTA singles title of Sequera's career.

=== Doubles ===
(United States) Vania King / (India) Sania Mirza defeated (Romania) Andreea Ehritt-Vanc / (Russia) Anastasia Rodionova 6–1, 6–2
