= Liina Suurvarik =

Estonian tennis player

- Country (sports): Estonia
- Born: 16 October 1980 (age 46) Tallinn, then part of Estonian SSR, Soviet Union
- Prize money: $9,461

Singles
- Career record: 26–41
- Highest ranking: No. 576 (4 October 1999)

Doubles
- Career record: 31–42
- Highest ranking: No. 351 (4 October 1999)

Team competitions
- Fed Cup: 18–13

Liina Suurvarik (born 16 October 1980) is an Estonian former professional tennis player.

Suurvarik has career-high WTA rankings of 576 in singles, achieved on 4 October 1999, and 351 in doubles, set on 4 October 1999. Playing for Estonia at the Fed Cup, Laupa has a win–loss record of 18–13.

Born and raised in Tallinn, Suurvarik studied at Illinois State University in the United States. Where she played tennis on the college team of the university. She played tennis on the Illinois State Redbirds college team.

== ITF Circuit finals ==
$10,000 tournaments

=== Doubles: 2 (0–2) ===
Outcome	No.	Date	Tournament	Surface	Partner	Opponents	Score
Runner-up	1.	2 August 1998	Horb, Germany	Hard	(Armenia) Liudmila Nikoyan	(Germany) Esther Brunn (Germany) Camilla Kremer	1–6, 6–7^{(2)}
Runner-up	2.	18 October 1998	Nicosia, Cyprus	Clay	(Lithuania) Galina Misiuriova	(Czech Republic) Eva Birnerová (Germany) Annette Zweck	3–6, 4–6
