= Senegal Billie Jean King Cup team =

The Senegal Fed Cup team represents Senegal in Fed Cup tennis competition and are governed by the Fédération Senegalaise de Tennis. They have not competed since 1995.

== History ==
Senegal competed in its first Fed Cup in 1982. They have lost all nine of their ties to date.

== See also ==
- Billie Jean King Cup
- Senegal Davis Cup team
