= Edita Liachovičiūtė =

Lithuanian tennis player

- Country (sports): Lithuania
- Born: 7 April 1976 (age 48); Palanga, Lithuania
- Plays: Left-handed
- Prize money: $10,755

Singles
- Career record: 38–39
- Highest ranking: No. 547 (8 July 2002)

Doubles
- Career record: 23–29
- Career titles: 2 ITF
- Highest ranking: No. 465 (21 October 2002)

Edita Liachovičiūtė (born 7 April 1976) is a Lithuanian former professional tennis player.

A left-handed player from Palanga, Liachovičiūtė made her Federation Cup debut for Lithuania in 1992. She appeared in a total of 29 Fed Cup ties, amassing ten singles and nine doubles wins. Since the Europe/Africa zone was split into different tiers in 1995 she always competed in Group II, until Lithuania overcame Portugal in the 2003 playoffs, with her win over Frederica Piedade securing promotion. The 2004 season in Group I was her final year of Fed Cup tennis.

Liachovičiūtė, who won two ITF doubles titles, now works as a tennis coach and has been a long serving captain of the Lithuania Fed Cup team, as well as running her own academy in Vilnius.

== ITF finals ==
Legend
$10,000 tournaments

=== Singles (0–2) ===
Result	No.	Date	Tournament	Surface	Opponent	Score
Loss	1.	4 November 2001	ITF Minsk, Belarus	Carpet	(Russia) Anna Bastrikova	1–6, 2–6
Loss	2.	11 May 2003	ITF Warsaw, Poland	Clay	(Czech Republic) Darina Šeděnková	6–7^{(0)}, 2–6

=== Doubles (2–1) ===
Result	No.	Date	Tournament	Surface	Partner	Opponents	Score
Win	1.	18 August 2002	ITF Koksijde, Belgium	Clay	(Ukraine) Valeria Bondarenko	(Czech Republic) Zuzana Černá (Czech Republic) Vladimíra Uhlířová	6–4, 6–2
Loss	1.	25 August 2002	ITF Westende, Belgium	Clay	(Ukraine) Valeria Bondarenko	(Belgium) Leslie Butkiewicz (Australia) Nicole Kriz	1–6, 6–7^{(4)}
Win	2.	14 September 2003	ITF Presov, Slovakia	Clay	(Slovakia) Zuzana Zemenová	(Israel) Shahar Peer (Israel) Efrat Zlotikamin	6–0, 4–6, 6–3
