= Habiba Ifrakh =

Moroccan tennis player

- Country (sports): Morocco
- Born: 3 March 1978 (age 47)
- Prize money: $8,314

Singles
- Highest ranking: No. 652 (22 Jul 2002)

Doubles
- Highest ranking: No. 838 (15 May 1995)

Habiba Ifrakh (born 3 March 1978) is a Moroccan former professional tennis player.

Trained at the Wifaq Tennis Academy in Rabat, Ifrakh was a member of the Morocco Fed Cup team between 1995 and 2009, winning seven singles and one doubles rubber across 14 ties. She also represented Morocco at the Mediterranean Games and Pan Arab Games.

Ifrakh had a best world ranking of 652 in singles and made two WTA Tour main draw appearances. In 2001, as a wildcard entrant in Casablanca, she won her first round match against Dutch player Kristie Boogert.

== ITF finals ==
=== Doubles: 1 (0–1) ===
Outcome	No.	Date	Tournament	Surface	Partner	Opponents	Score
Runner-up	1.	May 2005	Rabat, Morocco	Clay	(Morocco) Meryem El Haddad	(Estonia) Anet Kaasik (Slovenia) Andreja Klepač	0–6, 2–6
