= Heini Salonen =

Finnish tennis player

- Full name: Heini Salonen
- Country (sports): Finland
- Born: 11 July 1993 (age 31); Helsinki, Finland
- Prize money: $2,318

Singles
- Career record: 3–11
- Career titles: 0

Doubles
- Career record: 3–9
- Career titles: 0

Team competitions
- Fed Cup: 1–8

Heini Salonen (born 11 July 1993 in Helsinki) is a Finnish tennis player.

Salonen has a 1–8 record for Finland in Fed Cup competition.

== Fed Cup participation ==
=== Singles ===
Edition	Stage	Date	Location	Against	Surface	Opponent	W/L	Score
2008 Fed Cup; Europe/Africa Zone Group III	R/R	23 April 2008	Yerevan, Armenia	Montenegro	Clay	(Montenegro) Andjela Kankaraš	W	5–7, 6–1, 6–3
2008 Fed Cup; Europe/Africa Zone Group III	R/R	24 April 2008	Yerevan, Armenia	Egypt	Clay	(Egypt) Nihal Tarek-Saleh	L	1–6, 7–6^{(8–6)}, 4–6
2008 Fed Cup; Europe/Africa Zone Group III	R/R	25 April 2008	Yerevan, Armenia	Moldova	Clay	(Moldova) Ecaterina Vasenina	L	1–6, 2–6
2008 Fed Cup; Europe/Africa Zone Group III	R/R	26 April 2008	Yerevan, Armenia	Morocco	Clay	(Morocco) Lamia Essaadi	L	2–6, 3–6

=== Doubles ===
Edition	Stage	Date	Location	Against	Surface	Partner	Opponents	W/L	Score
2008 Fed Cup; Europe/Africa Zone Group III	R/R	23 April 2008	Yerevan, Armenia	Montenegro	Clay	(Finland) Essi Laine	(Montenegro) Mia Radulović (Montenegro) Stefana Lakićević	L	5–7, 5–7
2008 Fed Cup; Europe/Africa Zone Group III	R/R	24 April 2008	Yerevan, Armenia	Morocco	Clay	(Finland) Essi Laine	(Morocco) Fatima El Allami (Morocco) Nadia Lalami	L	1–6, 2–6
2009 Fed Cup; Europe/Africa Zone Group III	R/R	23 April 2009	Marsa, Malta	(Republic of Ireland) Ireland	Hard	(Finland) Cecilia Estlander	(Republic of Ireland) Jenny Claffey (Republic of Ireland) Lynsey McCullough	L	2–6, 3–6
2009 Fed Cup; Europe/Africa Zone Group III	R/R	25 April 2009	Marsa, Malta	Greece	Hard	(Finland) Cecilia Estlander	(Greece) Eleni Daniilidou (Greece) Eirini Georgatou	L	0–6, 1–6
2010 Fed Cup; Europe/Africa Zone Group II	R/R	30 April 2010	Yerevan, Armenia	Armenia	Clay	(Finland) Saana Saarteinen	(Armenia) Anna Movsisyan (Armenia) Liudmila Nikoyan	L	5–7, 3–6
