= 2008 Fed Cup Europe/Africa Zone Group III – Pool B =

International tennis competition

Group B of the 2008 Fed Cup Europe/Africa Zone Group III was one of two pools in Group III of the Europe/Africa zone of the 2008 Fed Cup. Six teams competed in a round-robin competition, with the top team advancing to Group II for 2009.

		(Finland) FIN	(Egypt) EGY	(Montenegro) MNE	(Moldova) MDA	(Morocco) MAR	(Armenia) ARM	Match; W–L	Set; W–L	Game; W–L	Standings
63	Finland		2–1	2–1	2–1	1–2	1–2	3–2	17–16	141–133	3
66	Egypt	1–2		2–1	2–1	0–3	0–3	2–3	12–23	137–170	4
77	Montenegro	1–2	1–2		2–1	0–3	1–2	1–4	12–23	130–181	5
79	Moldova	1–2	1–2	1–2		0–3	0–3	0–5	9–24	106–165	6
	Morocco	2–1	3–0	3–0	3–0		2–1	5–0	27–5	183–99	1
	Armenia	2–1	3–0	2–1	3–0	1–2		4–1	23–9	155–104	2

== Finland vs. Armenia ==
Finland
1
Master Class Tennis and Fitness Club, Yerevan, Armenia
22 April 2008
Red clay (outdoors)

Armenia
2

			1	2	3
1	(Finland) (Armenia)	Maria Fagerström; Anna Movsisyan	0; 6	1; 6
2	(Finland) (Armenia)	Emma Laine; Liudmila Nikoyan	6; 0	6; 2
3	(Finland) (Armenia)	Maria Fagerström / Emma Laine; Anna Movsisyan / Liudmila Nikoyan	3; 6	4; 6

== Egypt vs. Morocco ==
Egypt
0
Master Class Tennis and Fitness Club, Yerevan, Armenia
22 April 2008
Red clay (outdoors)

Morocco
3

			1	2	3
1	(Egypt) (Morocco)	Aliaa Fakhry; Lamia Essaadi	1; 6	2; 6
2	(Egypt) (Morocco)	Magy Aziz; Fatima El Allami	2; 6	5; 7
3	(Egypt) (Morocco)	Magy Aziz / Nihal Tarek-Saleh; Fatima El Allami / Nadia Lalami	1; 6	2; 6

== Montenegro vs. Moldova ==
Montenegro
2
Master Class Tennis and Fitness Club, Yerevan, Armenia
22 April 2008
Red clay (outdoors)

Moldova
1

			1	2	3
1	(Montenegro) (Moldova)	Andjela Kankaraš; Ecaterina Vasenina	1; 6	2; 6
2	(Montenegro) (Moldova)	Stefana Lakićević; Olga Terteac	4; 6	6; 4	6; 3
3	(Montenegro) (Moldova)	Andjela Kankaraš / Stefana Lakićević; Olga Cosic / Ecaterina Vasenina	6; 2	1; 6	6; 1

== Finland vs. Montenegro ==
Finland
2
Master Class Tennis and Fitness Club, Yerevan, Armenia
23 April 2008
Red clay (outdoors)

Montenegro
1

			1	2	3
1	(Finland) (Montenegro)	Heini Salonen; Andjela Kankaraš	5; 7	6; 1	6; 3
2	(Finland) (Montenegro)	Emma Laine; Stefana Lakićević	6; 1	6; 0
3	(Finland) (Montenegro)	Essi Laine / Heini Salonen; Mia Radulović / Stefana Lakićević	5; 7	5; 7

== Egypt vs. Moldova ==
Egypt
2
Master Class Tennis and Fitness Club, Yerevan, Armenia
23 April 2008
Red clay (outdoors)

Moldova
1

			1	2	3
1	(Egypt) (Moldova)	Nihal Tarek-Saleh; Ecaterina Vasenina	1; 6	4; 6
2	(Egypt) (Moldova)	Magy Aziz; Olga Terteac	6; 4	7; 5
3	(Egypt) (Moldova)	Aliaa Fakhry / Nihal Tarek-Saleh; Olga Terteac / Ecaterina Vasenina	3; 6	6; 1	6; 1

== Morocco vs. Armenia ==
Morocco
2
Master Class Tennis and Fitness Club, Yerevan, Armenia
23 April 2008
Red clay (outdoors)

Armenia
1

			1	2	3
1	(Morocco) (Armenia)	Nadia Lalami; Anna Movsisyan	6^{5} 7^{7}	6; 4	6; 2
2	(Morocco) (Armenia)	Fatima El Allami; Tatevik Yedigaryan	6; 2	6; 1
3	(Morocco) (Armenia)	Fatima El Allami / Nadia Lalami; Anna Movsisyan / Liudmila Nikoyan	3; 6	6; 2	5; 7

== Finland vs. Egypt ==
Finland
2
Master Class Tennis and Fitness Club, Yerevan, Armenia
24 April 2008
Red clay (outdoors)

Egypt
1

			1	2	3
1	(Finland) (Egypt)	Heini Salonen; Nihal Tarek-Saleh	1; 6	7^{8} 6^{6}	4; 6
2	(Finland) (Egypt)	Emma Laine; Magy Aziz	6; 4	6; 0
3	(Finland) (Egypt)	Emma Laine / Essi Laine; Aliaa Fakhry / Nihal Tarek-Saleh	6; 0	5; 7	6; 4

== Montenegro vs. Armenia ==
Montenegro
1
Master Class Tennis and Fitness Club, Yerevan, Armenia
24 April 2008
Red clay (outdoors)

Armenia
2

			1	2	3
1	(Montenegro) (Armenia)	Andjela Kankaraš; Anna Movsisyan	3; 6	1; 6
2	(Montenegro) (Armenia)	Stefana Lakićević; Ofelya Poghosyan	6; 2	6; 0
3	(Montenegro) (Armenia)	Andjela Kankaraš / Stefana Lakićević; Liudmila Nikoyan / Tatevik Yedigaryan	3; 6	0; 6

== Moldova vs. Morocco ==
Moldova
0
Master Class Tennis and Fitness Club, Yerevan, Armenia
24 April 2008
Red clay (outdoors)

Morocco
3

			1	2	3
1	(Moldova) (Morocco)	Ecaterina Vasenina; Lamia Essaadi	2; 6	1; 6
2	(Moldova) (Morocco)	Olga Terteac; Fatima El Allami	4; 6	2; 6
3	(Moldova) (Morocco)	Olga Terteac / Ecaterina Vasenina; Lina Bennani / Nadia Lalami	6^{5} 7^{7}	0; 6

== Finland vs. Moldova ==
Finland
2
Master Class Tennis and Fitness Club, Yerevan, Armenia
25 April 2008
Red clay (outdoors)

Moldova
1

			1	2	3
1	(Finland) (Moldova)	Heini Salonen; Ecaterina Vasenina	1; 6	2; 6
2	(Finland) (Moldova)	Emma Laine; Olga Terteac	6; 1	6; 1
3	(Finland) (Moldova)	Emma Laine / Essi Laine; Olga Terteac / Ecaterina Vasenina	6; 4	6; 2

== Egypt vs. Armenia ==
Egypt
0
Master Class Tennis and Fitness Club, Yerevan, Armenia
25 April 2008
Red clay (outdoors)

Armenia
3

			1	2	3
1	(Egypt) (Armenia)	Nihal Tarek-Saleh; Anna Movsisyan	2; 6	3; 6
2	(Egypt) (Armenia)	Magy Aziz; Liudmila Nikoyan	1; 6	3; 6
3	(Egypt) (Armenia)	Magy Aziz / Nihal Tarek-Saleh; Anna Movsisyan / Liudmila Nikoyan	3; 6	1; 6

== Montenegro vs. Morocco ==
Montenegro
0
Master Class Tennis and Fitness Club, Yerevan, Armenia
25 April 2008
Red clay (outdoors)

Morocco
3

			1	2	3
1	(Montenegro) (Morocco)	Andjela Kankaraš; Nadia Lalami	6^{0} 7^{7}	3; 6
2	(Montenegro) (Morocco)	Stefana Lakićević; Fatima El Allami	4; 6	4; 6
3	(Montenegro) (Morocco)	Mia Radulović / Andjela Kankaraš; Fatima El Allami / Nadia Lalami	2; 6	1; 6

== Finland vs. Morocco ==
Finland
1
Master Class Tennis and Fitness Club, Yerevan, Armenia
26 April 2008
Red clay (outdoors)

Morocco
2

			1	2	3
1	(Finland) (Morocco)	Heini Salonen; Lamia Essaadi	2; 6	3; 6
2	(Finland) (Morocco)	Emma Laine; Fatima El Allami	6; 3	6; 1
3	(Finland) (Morocco)	Essi Laine / Heini Salonen; Fatima El Allami / Nadia Lalami	1; 6	2; 6

== Egypt vs. Montenegro ==
Egypt
2
Master Class Tennis and Fitness Club, Yerevan, Armenia
26 April 2008
Red clay (outdoors)

Montenegro
1

			1	2	3
1	(Egypt) (Montenegro)	Nihal Tarek-Saleh; Mia Radulović	4; 6	6; 1	6^{6} 7^{8}
2	(Egypt) (Montenegro)	Magy Aziz; Stefana Lakićević	4; 6	6; 2	6; 3
3	(Egypt) (Montenegro)	Magy Aziz / Nihal Tarek-Saleh; Stefana Lakićević / Mia Radulović	7^{7} 6^{5}	6; 2

== Moldova vs. Armenia ==
Moldova
0
Master Class Tennis and Fitness Club, Yerevan, Armenia
26 April 2008
Red clay (outdoors)

Armenia
3

			1	2	3
1	(Moldova) (Armenia)	Ecaterina Vasenina; Anna Movsisyan	2; 6	0; 6
2	(Moldova) (Armenia)	Olga Terteac; Liudmila Nikoyan	4; 6	0; 6
3	(Moldova) (Armenia)	Olga Terteac / Ecaterina Vasenina; Anna Movsisyan / Liudmila Nikoyan	1; 6	1; 6

- Morocco placed first in this group and thus advanced to Group II for 2009, where they placed last in their pool of three. They were thus relegated back down to Group III for 2010.

== See also ==
- Fed Cup structure
