= Tennis at the 2011 Arab Games – Women's doubles =

Women's doubles
- Tennis at the 2011 Pan Arab Games

Final
- Champions: (Egypt) Yasmeen Ebada; (Egypt) Ola Hammoud
- Runners-up: (Morocco) Fatyha Berjane; (Morocco) Nadia Lalami
- Score: 7–5, 6–0

Events
Singles	men	women
Doubles	men	women
Team	men	women
← 2007 ·	Pan Arab Games	· 2015 →

The Women's doubles tennis competition at the 2011 Pan Arab Games in Doha, Qatar was held from 13 December to 15 December at the Khalifa International Complex

== Medalists ==
Event	Gold	Silver	Bronze
Women's doubles	Egypt (EGY); Yasmeen Ebada; Ola Hammoud	Morocco (MAR); Fatyha Berjane; Nadia Lalami	Tunisia (TUN); Nour Abbès; Ons Jabeur
Women's doubles	Egypt (EGY); Yasmeen Ebada; Ola Hammoud	Morocco (MAR); Fatyha Berjane; Nadia Lalami	Oman (OMA); Sarah Al Balushi; Fatma Al Nabhani

== Seeds ==
1. Morocco (MAR) Fatyha Berjane / Nadia Lalami (final, silver medalists)
2. Oman (OMA) Sarah Al Balushi / Fatma Al Nabhani (semifinals, bronze medalists)
3. Tunisia (TUN) Nour Abbès / Ons Jabeur (semifinals, bronze medalists)
4. Egypt (EGY) Yasmeen Ebada / Ola Hammoud (champions, gold medalists)

== Draw ==
=== Key ===
- Q = Qualifier
- WC = Wild card
- LL = Lucky loser
- Alt = Alternate
- SE = Special exempt
- PR = Protected ranking
- ITF = ITF entry
- JE = Junior exempt
- w/o = Walkover
- r = Retired
- d = Defaulted
- SR = Special ranking

=== Tournament bracket ===
Quarterfinals
1	(Morocco) Fatyha Berjane; Nadia Lalami	w/o
(Sudan) Samia Ismail; Samah Yahia
3	(Tunisia) Nour Abbès; Ons Jabeur	6	6
(Kuwait) Latifah Alsayed Omar; Sarah Behbehani	0	0
(Libya) Rehab Alhalak; Raha Arousi	0	0
4	(Egypt) Yasmeen Ebada; Ola Hammoud	6	6
(Iraq) Lana Al-Katan; Karoon Kaloian	0	0
2	(Oman) Sarah Al Balushi; Fatma Al Nabhani	6	6

Semifinals
1	(Morocco) Fatyha Berjane; Nadia Lalami	w/o
3	(Tunisia) Nour Abbès; Ons Jabeur
4	(Egypt) Yasmeen Ebada; Ola Hammoud	6	6
2	(Oman) Sarah Al Balushi; Fatma Al Nabhani	1	0

Finals
1	(Morocco) Fatyha Berjane; Nadia Lalami	5	0
4	(Egypt) Yasmeen Ebada; Ola Hammoud	7	6
