= Saana Saarteinen =

Finnish tennis player

- Full name: Saana Saarteinen
- Country (sports): Finland
- Born: 11 February 1993 (age 32); Tampere, Finland
- Height: 1.75 m (5 ft 9 in)
- College: University of Tulsa (2012–2016)
- Prize money: $4,883

Singles
- Career record: 12–27
- Career titles: 0
- Highest ranking: 1083 (11 October 2010)

Doubles
- Career record: 10–29
- Career titles: 0
- Highest ranking: 929 (18 July 2011)

Team competitions
- Fed Cup: 0–1

Saana Saarteinen (born 11 February 1993) is a Finnish tennis and padel player.

== Career ==
Saarteinen was born in Tampere. On 11 October 2010, she reached her best singles ranking of world number 1083. On 18 July 2011, she peaked at world number 929 in the doubles rankings.

Saarteinen has a 0–1 record for Finland in Fed Cup competition.

Saana Saarteinen's great-grandfather was the Finnish track and field athlete Eino Seppälä.

== Fed Cup participation ==
=== Doubles ===
Edition	Stage	Date	Location	Against	Surface	Partner	Opponents	W/L	Score
2010 Fed Cup; Europe/Africa Zone Group II	R/R	30 April 2010	Yerevan, Armenia	Armenia	Clay	(Finland) Heini Salonen	(Armenia) Anna Movsisyan (Armenia) Liudmila Nikoyan	L	5–7, 3–6
