= 2010 Fed Cup Europe/Africa Zone Group II – Pool B =

Part of a tennis tournament

Group B of the 2010 Fed Cup Europe/Africa Zone Group II was one of two pools in the Europe/Africa Zone Group II of the 2010 Fed Cup. Four teams competed in a round robin competition, with the top team and the bottom two teams proceeding to their respective sections of the play-offs: the top teams played for advancement to Group I, while the bottom teams faced potential relegation to Group III.

		(Armenia) ARM	(Georgia (country)) GEO	(Norway) NOR	(Finland) FIN	RR; W–L	Set; W–L	Game; W–L	Standings
63	Armenia		0–2	1–2	1–2	0–3	7–13	74–99	4
65	Georgia	2–0		3–0	1–2	2–1	12–5	91–61	2
69	Norway	2–1	0–3		0–2	1–2	5–14	57–100	3
72	Finland	2–1	2–1	2–0		3–0	12–4	89–51	1

== Georgia vs. Finland ==
Georgia
1
Orange Fitness & Tennis Club, Yerevan, Armenia
28 April 2010
Red clay (outdoors)

Finland
2

			1	2	3
1	(Georgia (country)) (Finland)	Oksana Kalashnikova; Piia Suomalainen	4; 6	2; 6
2	(Georgia (country)) (Finland)	Anna Tatishvili; Emma Laine	6; 4	6; 3
3	(Georgia (country)) (Finland)	Oksana Kalashnikova / Anna Tatishvili; Emma Laine / Piia Suomalainen	5; 7	2; 6

== Armenia vs. Norway ==
Armenia
1
Orange Fitness & Tennis Club, Yerevan, Armenia
28 April 2010
Red clay (outdoors)

Norway
2

			1	2	3
1	(Armenia) (Norway)	Anna Movsisyan; Emma Flood	6; 3	4; 6	4; 6
2	(Armenia) (Norway)	Ani Amiraghyan; Ulrikke Eikeri	4; 6	6; 2	6; 3
3	(Armenia) (Norway)	Anna Movsisyan / Liudmila Nikoyan; Ulrikke Eikeri / Emma Flood	6; 3	3; 6	[7] [10]

== Georgia vs. Armenia ==
Georgia
2
Orange Fitness & Tennis Club, Yerevan, Armenia
30 April 2010
Red clay (outdoors)

Armenia
0

			1	2	3
1	(Georgia (country)) (Armenia)	Sofia Shapatava; Marie-Gaiane Mikaelian	6; 1	6^{6} 7^{8}	6; 4
2	(Georgia (country)) (Armenia)	Anna Tatishvili; Liudmila Nikoyan	6; 0	6; 1
3	(Georgia (country)) (Armenia)					not played

== Georgia vs. Norway ==
Georgia
3
Orange Fitness & Tennis Club, Yerevan, Armenia
30 April 2010
Red clay (outdoors)

Norway
0

			1	2	3
1	(Georgia (country)) (Norway)	Oksana Kalashnikova; Emma Flood	6; 4	6; 4
2	(Georgia (country)) (Norway)	Anna Tatishvili; Ulrikke Eikeri	6; 2	6; 3
3	(Georgia (country)) (Norway)	Oksana Kalashnikova / Sofia Shapatava; Hedda Ødegaard / Caroline Rohde-Moe	6; 2	6; 1

== Armenia vs. Finland ==
Armenia
1
Orange Fitness & Tennis Club, Yerevan, Armenia
30 April 2010
Red clay (outdoors)

Finland
2

			1	2	3
1	(Armenia) (Finland)	Ani Amiraghyan; Piia Suomalainen	0; 6	5; 7
2	(Armenia) (Finland)	Marie-Gaiane Mikaelian; Emma Laine	0; 6	3; 6
3	(Armenia) (Finland)	Anna Movsisyan / Liudmila Nikoyan; Saana Saarteinen / Heini Salonen	7; 5	6; 3

== Norway vs. Finland ==
Norway
0
Orange Fitness & Tennis Club, Yerevan, Armenia
30 April 2010
Red clay (outdoors)

Finland
2

			1	2	3
1	(Norway) (Finland)	Emma Flood; Piia Suomalainen	0; 6	2; 6
2	(Norway) (Finland)	Ulrikke Eikeri; Emma Laine	1; 6	2; 6
3	(Norway) (Finland)					not played

== See also ==
- Fed Cup structure
