= Cecilia Estlander =

Finnish tennis player

- Full name: Cecilia Estlander
- Country (sports): Finland
- Born: 26 February 1992 (age 33); Helsinki, Finland
- Height: 1.78 m (5 ft 10 in)
- Prize money: $4,395

Singles
- Career record: 9–24
- Career titles: 0
- Highest ranking: 956 (11 October 2010)

Doubles
- Career record: 10–18
- Career titles: 0
- Highest ranking: 878 (18 July 2011)

Team competitions
- Fed Cup: 1–3

Cecilia Estlander (born 26 February 1992 in Helsinki) is a Finnish tennis player.

On 11 October 2010, Estlander reached her best singles ranking of world number 956. On 18 July 2011, she peaked at world number 878 in the doubles rankings.

Estlander has a 1–3 record for Finland in Fed Cup competition.

== ITF finals (0–1) ==
=== Doubles (0–1) ===
Legend $100,000 tournaments $75,000 tournaments $50,000 tournaments $25,000 tournaments $15,000 tournaments $10,000 tournaments	Finals by surface Hard (0–0) Clay (0–1) Grass (0–0) Carpet (0–0)

Outcome	No.	Date	Tournament	Surface	Partner	Opponents	Score
Runner-up	1.	23 May 2011	Bucharest, Romania	Clay	(Austria) Katharina Negrin	(Romania) Laura-Ioana Andrei (Romania) Camelia Hristea	6–7^{(5–7)}, 1–6

== Fed Cup participation ==
=== Singles ===
Edition	Stage	Date	Location	Against	Surface	Opponent	W/L	Score
2009 Fed Cup; Europe/Africa Zone Group III	R/R	25 April 2009	Marsa, Malta	Greece	Hard	(Greece) Eleni Daniilidou	L	1–6, 1–6

=== Doubles ===
Edition	Stage	Date	Location	Against	Surface	Partner	Opponents	W/L	Score
2009 Fed Cup; Europe/Africa Zone Group III	R/R	23 April 2009	Marsa, Malta	(Republic of Ireland) Ireland	Hard	(Finland) Heini Salonen	(Republic of Ireland) Jenny Claffey (Republic of Ireland) Lynsey McCullough	L	2–6, 3–6
2009 Fed Cup; Europe/Africa Zone Group III	R/R	24 April 2009	Marsa, Malta	Algeria	Hard	(Finland) Piia Suomalainen	(Algeria) Yasmine Alkema (Algeria) Assia Halo	W	6–4, 7–6^{(8–6)}
2009 Fed Cup; Europe/Africa Zone Group III	R/R	25 April 2009	Marsa, Malta	Greece	Hard	(Finland) Heini Salonen	(Greece) Eleni Daniilidou (Greece) Eirini Georgatou	L	0–6, 1–6
