= 2009 Fed Cup Europe/Africa Zone Group III – Pool A =

International tennis competition

Group A of the 2009 Fed Cup Europe/Africa Zone Group III was one of two pools in Group III of the Europe/Africa zone of the 2009 Fed Cup. Five teams competed in a round robin competition, with the top team advanced to Group II for 2010.

		(Greece) GRE	(Finland) FIN	(Republic of Ireland) IRL	(Algeria) ALG	(Malta) MLT	Match; W–L	Set; W–L	Game; W–L	Standings
60	Greece		3–0	3–0	3–0	2–1	4–0	23–3	151–68	1
64	Finland	0–3		2–1	3–0	3–0	3–1	17–9	128–97	2
71	Ireland	0–3	1–2		3–0	2–1	2–2	12–14	101–115	3
81	Algeria	0–3	0–3	0–3		1–2	0–4	3–23	84–150	5
82	Malta	1–2	0–3	1–2	2–1		1–3	11–17	109–143	4

== Finland vs. Malta ==
Finland
2
Marsa Sports Club, Marsa, Malta
21 April 2009
Tarmac (outdoors)

Malta
1

			1	2	3
1	(Finland) (Malta)	Piia Suomalainen; Kimberley Cassar	6; 3	4; 6	6; 2
2	(Finland) (Malta)	Emma Laine; Elaine Genovese	6; 0	6; 1
3	(Finland) (Malta)	Emma Laine / Piia Suomalainen; Lisa Camenzuli / Stephanie Sullivan	6; 3	6; 3

== Ireland vs. Algeria ==
Ireland
3
Marsa Sports Club, Marsa, Malta
21 April 2009
Tarmac (outdoors)

Algeria
0

			1	2	3
1	(Republic of Ireland) (Algeria)	Amy Bowtell; Amira Benaissa	1; 6	6; 2	6; 1
2	(Republic of Ireland) (Algeria)	Rachael Dillon; Fatima Zorah Bouabdallah	6; 4	6; 4
3	(Republic of Ireland) (Algeria)	Jenny Claffey / Lynsey McCullough; Yasmine Alkema / Assia Halo	6; 0	6; 3

== Greece vs. Ireland ==
Greece
3
Marsa Sports Club, Marsa, Malta
22 April 2009
Tarmac (outdoors)

Ireland
0

			1	2	3
1	(Greece) (Republic of Ireland)	Eleni Daniilidou; Amy Bowtell	6; 2	6; 2
2	(Greece) (Republic of Ireland)	Anna Gerasimou; Rachael Dillon	6; 0	6; 1
3	(Greece) (Republic of Ireland)	Eleni Daniilidou / Anna Gerasimou; Jenny Claffey / Lynsey McCullough	6; 2	6; 2

== Algeria vs. Malta ==
Algeria
1
Marsa Sports Club, Marsa, Malta
22 April 2009
Tarmac (outdoors)

Malta
2

			1	2	3
1	(Algeria) (Malta)	Yasmine Alkema; Kimberley Cassar	3; 6	2; 6
2	(Algeria) (Malta)	Fatima Zorah Bouabdallah; Elaine Genovese	4; 6	7; 5	6; 3
3	(Algeria) (Malta)	Amira Benaissa / Assia Halo; Lisa Camenzuli / Kimberley Cassar	6^{1} 7^{7}	2; 6

== Greece vs. Algeria ==
Greece
3
Marsa Sports Club, Marsa, Malta
23 April 2009
Tarmac (outdoors)

Algeria
0

			1	2	3
1	(Greece) (Algeria)	Eleni Daniilidou; Assia Halo	6; 2	6; 2
2	(Greece) (Algeria)	Anna Gerasimou; Yasmine Alkema	6; 3	6; 2
3	(Greece) (Algeria)	Eirini Georgatou / Anna Gerasimou; Amira Benaissa / Assia Halo	6; 4	6; 3

== Finland vs. Ireland ==
Finland
2
Marsa Sports Club, Marsa, Malta
23 April 2009
Tarmac (outdoors)

Ireland
1

			1	2	3
1	(Finland) (Republic of Ireland)	Piia Suomalainen; Amy Bowtell	7; 5	6; 4
2	(Finland) (Republic of Ireland)	Emma Laine; Rachael Dillon	6; 1	6; 0
3	(Finland) (Republic of Ireland)	Cecilia Estlander / Heini Salonen; Jenny Claffey / Lynsey McCullough	2; 6	3; 6

== Greece vs. Malta ==
Greece
2
Marsa Sports Club, Marsa, Malta
24 April 2009
Tarmac (outdoors)

Malta
1

			1	2	3
1	(Greece) (Malta)	Eleni Daniilidou; Stephanie Sullivan	6; 1	6; 3
2	(Greece) (Malta)	Anna Gerasimou; Kimberley Cassar	6; 4	6^{5} 7^{7}	4; 6
3	(Greece) (Malta)	Eleni Daniilidou / Eirini Georgatou; Kimberley Cassar / Elaine Genovese	6; 0	6; 2

== Finland vs. Algeria ==
Finland
3
Marsa Sports Club, Marsa, Malta
24 April 2009
Tarmac (outdoors)

Algeria
0

			1	2	3
1	(Finland) (Algeria)	Piia Suomalainen; Amira Benaissa	7; 5	6; 3
2	(Finland) (Algeria)	Emma Laine; Fatima Zorah Bouabdallah	6; 0	6; 0
3	(Finland) (Algeria)	Cecilia Estlander / Piia Suomalainen; Yasmine Alkema / Assia Halo	6; 4	7^{8} 6^{6}

== Greece vs. Finland ==
Greece
3
Marsa Sports Club, Marsa, Malta
25 April 2009
Tarmac (outdoors)

Finland
0

			1	2	3
1	(Greece) (Finland)	Eleni Daniilidou; Cecilia Estlander	6; 1	6; 1
2	(Greece) (Finland)	Anna Gerasimou; Emma Laine	1; 6	7^{9} 6^{7}	7; 5
3	(Greece) (Finland)	Eleni Daniilidou / Eirini Georgatou; Cecilia Estlander / Heini Salonen	6; 0	6; 1

== Ireland vs. Malta ==
Ireland
2
Marsa Sports Club, Marsa, Malta
25 April 2009
Tarmac (outdoors)

Malta
1

			1	2	3
1	(Republic of Ireland) (Malta)	Amy Bowtell; Stephanie Sullivan	6; 4	6; 1
2	(Republic of Ireland) (Malta)	Rachael Dillon; Kimberley Cassar	6^{5} 7^{7}	4; 6
3	(Republic of Ireland) (Malta)	Jenny Claffey / Lynsey McCullough; Lisa Camenzuli / Kimberley Cassar	6; 4	4; 6	[10] [4]

- Greece placed first in this group and thus advanced to Group II for 2010. They placed first in their pool of four and also won their promotion play-off match, meaning they achieved promotion to Group I for 2011.

== See also ==
- Fed Cup structure
