= 2008 Grand Prix SAR La Princesse Lalla Meryem =

- Date: 28 April – 4 May
- Edition: 8th

Champions

Singles
- (Argentina) Gisela Dulko

Doubles
- (Romania) Sorana Cîrstea / (Russia) Anastasia Pavlyuchenkova
- Morocco Open

The 2008 Grand Prix SAR La Princesse Lalla Meryem was a tennis tournament played on outdoor clay courts. It was the 8th edition of the Grand Prix SAR La Princesse Lalla Meryem, and was part of the Tier IV Series of the 2008 WTA Tour. It took place in Fes, Morocco, from 28 April until 4 May 2008.

== Singles ==
Milagros Sequera was the defending champion, but chose not to participate that year.

Gisela Dulko won in the final 7–6(2), 7–6(5), against Anabel Medina Garrigues.

=== Seeds ===
1. (Spain) Anabel Medina Garrigues (final)
2. (Argentina) Gisela Dulko (champion)
3. (Italy) Tathiana Garbin (second round)
4. (France) Aravane Rezaï (semifinals)
5. (Switzerland) Timea Bacsinszky (second round)
6. (Russia) Alisa Kleybanova (quarterfinals)
7. (Romania) Sorana Cîrstea (quarterfinals)
8. (Russia) Ekaterina Makarova (second round)

=== Finals ===
Semifinals
1	(Spain) Anabel Medina Garrigues	6	7
(Hungary) Gréta Arn	3	6^{3}
4	(France) Aravane Rezaï	6^{6}	3
2	(Argentina) Gisela Dulko	7	6

Final
1	(Spain) Anabel Medina Garrigues	6^{2}	6^{5}
2	(Argentina) Gisela Dulko	7	7

==== Top half ====
First round
1	(Spain) A Medina Garrigues	4	6	6
(Spain) L Domínguez Lino	6	2	1
(Bulgaria) S Karatantcheva	7	6
(United Kingdom) E Baltacha	5	2
(Luxembourg) A Kremer	6	3	0
(Ukraine) O Savchuk	4	6	6
(Slovenia) A Klepač	2	3
8	(Russia) E Makarova	6	6
3	(Italy) T Garbin	4	6	6
(Colombia) C Castaño	6	3	3
(Hungary) G Arn	6	6
Q	(Australia) J Dokić	4	2
(Czech Republic) P Cetkovská	6	7
(Germany) S Kloesel	4	5
WC	(Morocco) N Lalami	2	4
5	(Switzerland) T Bacsinszky	6	6

Second round
1	(Spain) A Medina Garrigues	3	7	6
(Bulgaria) S Karatantcheva	6	6^{4}	1
(Ukraine) O Savchuk	7	6
8	(Russia) E Makarova	6^{4}	4
3	(Italy) T Garbin	4	5
(Hungary) G Arn	6	7
(Czech Republic) P Cetkovská	6	7
5	(Switzerland) T Bacsinszky	1	5

Quarterfinals
1	(Spain) A Medina Garrigues	6	6
(Ukraine) O Savchuk	1	1
(Hungary) G Arn	6	6
(Czech Republic) P Cetkovská	2	2

Semifinals
1	(Spain) A Medina Garrigues	6	7
(Hungary) G Arn	3	6^{3}

==== Bottom half ====
First round
6	(Russia) A Kleybanova	6	6
Q	(Canada) A Wozniak	2	3
Q	(Russia) A Rodionova	6	6
WC	(Morocco) L Essaadi	1	1
(Paraguay) R de los Ríos	6	6
(United States) L Osterloh	4	4
(United States) V King	2	4
4	(France) A Rezaï	6	6
7	(Romania) S Cîrstea	2	6	6
(New Zealand) M Erakovic	6	3	2
Q	(Russia) A Pavlyuchenkova	6	6
WC	(Morocco) FZ El Allami	0	1
(United Kingdom) K O'Brien	7	4	1
(France) É Loit	6^{7}	6	6
(Italy) ME Camerin	1	1
2	(Argentina) G Dulko	6	6

Second round
6	(Russia) A Kleybanova	6^{3}	6	6
Q	(Russia) A Rodionova	7	3	4
(Paraguay) R de los Ríos	6^{2}	0
4	(France) A Rezaï	7	6
7	(Romania) S Cîrstea	6	6
Q	(Russia) A Pavlyuchenkova	4	2
(France) É Loit	3	2
2	(Argentina) G Dulko	6	6

Quarterfinals
6	(Russia) A Kleybanova	7	5	5
4	(France) A Rezaï	5	7	7
7	(Romania) S Cîrstea	0	3
2	(Argentina) G Dulko	6	6

Semifinals
4	(France) A Rezaï	6^{6}	3
2	(Argentina) G Dulko	7	6

== Doubles ==
Vania King and Sania Mirza were the defending champions, but Mirza chose not to participate, and only King competed that year.
King partnered with Lourdes Domínguez Lino, but lost in the first round to Sorana Cîrstea and Anastasia Pavlyuchenkova.

Sorana Cîrstea and Anastasia Pavlyuchenkova won in the final 6–2, 6–2, against Alisa Kleybanova and Ekaterina Makarova.

=== Seeds ===
1. (Spain) Lourdes Domínguez Lino / (United States) Vania King (first round)
2. (Argentina) Gisela Dulko / (Argentina) Betina Jozami (first round)
3. (Russia) Alisa Kleybanova / (Russia) Ekaterina Makarova (final)
4. (New Zealand) Marina Erakovic / (Russia) Alina Jidkova (first round)

=== Draw ===
First round
1	(Spain) L Domínguez Lino (United States) V King	6^{8}	5
(Romania) S Cîrstea (Russia) A Pavlyuchenkova	7	7
(Switzerland) T Bacsinszky (Germany) S Kloesel	7	6
(Russia) N Bratchikova (Belarus) K Milevskaya	5	2
4	(New Zealand) M Erakovic (Russia) A Jidkova	4	3
(Russia) M Kondratieva (France) S Lefèvre	6	6
(Czech Republic) P Cetkovská (Ukraine) O Savchuk	4	6	[3]
(Slovenia) A Klepač (United States) L Osterloh	6	3	[10]
(Italy) ME Camerin (Paraguay) R de los Ríos	6	6
WC	(Morocco) FZ El Allami (Morocco) N Lalami	3	2
(United Kingdom) E Baltacha (United Kingdom) A Elliott	0	r
3	(Russia) A Kleybanova (Russia) E Makarova	5
(South Africa) K Anderson (United Kingdom) K O'Brien	3	6	[2]
(Colombia) C Castaño (Luxembourg) A Kremer	6	3	[10]
(Sweden) J Larsson (Russia) A Rodionova	7	6
2	(Argentina) G Dulko (Argentina) B Jozami	6^{2}	3

Quarterfinals
(Romania) S Cîrstea (Russia) A Pavlyuchenkova	w/o
(Switzerland) T Bacsinszky (Germany) S Kloesel
(Russia) M Kondratieva (France) S Lefèvre	7	6
(Slovenia) A Klepač (United States) L Osterloh	6^{3}	1
(Italy) ME Camerin (Paraguay) R de los Ríos	4	3
3	(Russia) A Kleybanova (Russia) E Makarova	6	6
(Colombia) C Castaño (Luxembourg) A Kremer	5	6^{3}
(Sweden) J Larsson (Russia) A Rodionova	7	7

Semifinals
(Romania) S Cîrstea (Russia) A Pavlyuchenkova	4	6	[16]
(Russia) M Kondratieva (France) S Lefèvre	6	4	[14]
3	(Russia) A Kleybanova (Russia) E Makarova	6	6
(Sweden) J Larsson (Russia) A Rodionova	1	3

Final
(Romania) S Cîrstea (Russia) A Pavlyuchenkova	6	6
3	(Russia) A Kleybanova (Russia) E Makarova	2	2
