= Tennis at the 2011 Arab Games =

Tennis at the 2011 Pan Arab Games
- Venue: Khalifa International Tennis and Squash Complex
- Location: Doha, Qatar

At the 2011 Pan Arab Games, the tennis events were held at Khalifa International Tennis and Squash Complex in Doha, Qatar from 6–16 December. A total of 6 events were contested.

== Medal summary ==
=== Medal table ===
Rank	Nation	Gold	Silver	Bronze	Total
1	Tunisia	2	2	1	5
2	Egypt	2	1	1	4
3	Kuwait	1	2	0	3
4	Oman	1	0	2	3
5	Morocco	0	1	7	8
6	United Arab Emirates	0	0	1	1
Totals (6 entries)		6	6	12	24

=== Medal events ===
Event	Gold	Silver	Bronze
Men's Singles	Malek Jaziri (TUN)	Abdullah Maqdas (KUW)	Anas Fattar (MAR)
Men's Singles	Malek Jaziri (TUN)	Abdullah Maqdas (KUW)	Mehdi Ziadi (MAR)
Women's Singles	Fatma Al Nabhani (OMA)	Nour Abbès (TUN)	Lina Bennani (MAR)
Women's Singles	Fatma Al Nabhani (OMA)	Nour Abbès (TUN)	Nadia Lalami (MAR)
Men's Doubles	Kuwait (KUW); Mohammed Ghareeb; Abdullah Maqdas	Tunisia (TUN); Ameur Ben Hassen; Malek Jaziri	Morocco (MAR); Anas Fattar; Mehdi Ziadi
Men's Doubles	Kuwait (KUW); Mohammed Ghareeb; Abdullah Maqdas	Tunisia (TUN); Ameur Ben Hassen; Malek Jaziri	Egypt (EGY); Omar Hedayet; Karim Mostafa
Women's Doubles	Egypt (EGY); Yasmeen Ebada; Ola Hammoud	Morocco (MAR); Fatyha Berjane; Nadia Lalami	Tunisia (TUN); Nour Abbès; Ons Jabeur
Women's Doubles	Egypt (EGY); Yasmeen Ebada; Ola Hammoud	Morocco (MAR); Fatyha Berjane; Nadia Lalami	Oman (OMA); Sarah Al Balushi; Fatma Al Nabhani
Men's Team	Egypt (EGY); Omar Hedayet; Sherif Hussein; Mohamed Mahmoud; Karim Mostafa	Kuwait (KUW); Hasan Almousa; Ali Ghareeb; Mohammed Ghareeb; Abdullah Maqdas	Morocco (MAR); Anas Fattar; Yassine Idmbark; Younès Rachidi; Mehdi Ziadi
Men's Team	Egypt (EGY); Omar Hedayet; Sherif Hussein; Mohamed Mahmoud; Karim Mostafa	Kuwait (KUW); Hasan Almousa; Ali Ghareeb; Mohammed Ghareeb; Abdullah Maqdas	United Arab Emirates (UAE); Omar Al Awadhi; Hamad Janahi
Women's Team	Tunisia (TUN); Nour Abbès; Sonia Dagou; Ons Jabeur	Egypt (EGY); Yasmeen Ebada; Menatalla El Dahshan; Ola Hammoud; Magy Mikhail	Morocco (MAR); Lina Bennani; Fatyha Berjane; Habiba Ifrakh; Nadia Lalami
Women's Team	Tunisia (TUN); Nour Abbès; Sonia Dagou; Ons Jabeur	Egypt (EGY); Yasmeen Ebada; Menatalla El Dahshan; Ola Hammoud; Magy Mikhail	Oman (OMA); Sarah Al Balushi; Fatma Al Nabhani; Maliha Al Waidi
