= Lamia Essaadi =

Moroccan tennis player (born 1979)

- Country (sports): Morocco
- Born: 3 October 1979 (age 46) Casablanca, Morocco
- Retired: 2009
- Plays: Right-handed
- Prize money: $46,021

Singles
- Career record: 59–79
- Career titles: 1 ITF
- Highest ranking: No. 469 (30 April 2001)

Doubles
- Career record: 19–57
- Career titles: 0
- Highest ranking: No. 398 (9 November 1998)

Team competitions
- Fed Cup: 3–0

Lamia Essaadi (born 3 October 1979) is a Moroccan former professional tennis player.

Essaadi has career-high WTA rankings of 469 in singles, achieved on 30 April 2001, and 398 in doubles, set on 9 November 1998. She won one singles title on the ITF Women's Circuit. Her only WTA Tour main-draw appearance came at the 2008 Grand Prix SAR La Princesse Lalla Meryem.

Playing for Morocco Fed Cup team, Essaadi has a win–loss record of 3–0.

== ITF finals ==
$25,000 tournaments
$10,000 tournaments

=== Singles: 3 (1 title, 2 runner–ups) ===
Result	W–L	Date	Tournament	Tier	Surface	Opponent	Score
Loss	0–1	May 2000	ITF Caserta, Italy	10,000	Clay	(Argentina) María Emilia Salerni	4–6, 1–6
Win	1–1	Aug 2008	ITF Rabat, Morocco	10,000	Clay	(Italy) Lisa Sabino	7–6^{(4)}, 6–2
Loss	1–2	Oct 2008	ITF Vila Real de Santo António, Portugal	10,000	Clay	(Morocco) Nadia Lalami	1–2 ret.

=== Doubles: 1 (runner–up) ===
Result	W–L	Date	Tournament	Tier	Surface	Partnering	Opponents	Score
Loss	0–1	Nov 1999	ITF Ismailia, Egypt	10,000	Clay	(South Africa) Monique Le Sueur	(Italy) Sabina Da Ponte (Slovakia) Silvia Uríčková	1–6, 2–6

== Fed Cup participation ==
=== Singles ===
Edition	Stage	Date	Location	Against	Surface	Opponent	W/L	Score
2008 Fed Cup; Europe/Africa Zone Group III	R/R	22 April 2008	Yerevan, Armenia	(Egypt) Egypt	Clay	(Egypt) Aliaa Fakhry	W	6–1, 6–2
2008 Fed Cup; Europe/Africa Zone Group III	R/R	24 April 2008	Yerevan, Armenia	Moldova	Clay	(Moldova) Ecaterina Vasenina	W	6–2, 6–1
2008 Fed Cup; Europe/Africa Zone Group III	R/R	26 April 2008	Yerevan, Armenia	Finland	Clay	(Finland) Heini Salonen	W	6–2, 6–3

== ITF Junior finals ==
=== Doubles (2–0) ===
Result	W–L	Date	Tournament	Grade	Surface	Partner	Opponents	Score
Win	1–0	September 1995	Giza, Egypt	G5	Hard	(Morocco) Habiba Ifrakh	(Austria) Birgit Krell (Austria) Kati Wolner	w/o
Win	2–0	July 1996	Casablanca, Morocco	G5	Hard	(Morocco) Meryem El Haddad	(Egypt) Sara Abaza (Egypt) Nazly El Sawaf	6–4, 3–6, 6–0
