= Nour Abbès =

Tunisian tennis player (born 1993)

Nour Abbès نور عباس
- Country (sports): Tunisia
- Residence: Tunis, Tunisia
- Born: 20 June 1993 (age 33) Tunis
- Plays: Right-handed (two-handed backhand)
- Prize money: $5,363

Singles
- Career record: 16–20
- Career titles: 0
- Highest ranking: No. 887 (1 November 2010)

Doubles
- Career record: 15–13
- Career titles: 1 ITF
- Highest ranking: No. 823 (11 June 2012)
Medal record
Women's Tennis
Representing Tunisia
All-Africa Games
Gold medal – first place	2011 Maputo	Team Event
Silver medal – second place	2011 Maputo	Doubles
Bronze medal – third place	2011 Maputo	Singles
Pan Arab Games
Gold medal – first place	2011 Doha	Team Event
Silver medal – second place	2011 Doha	Singles
Bronze medal – third place	2011 Doha	Doubles

Nour Abbès (Arabic: نور عباس; born 20 June 1993) is a Tunisian former tennis player.

In her career, Abbès won one doubles title on the ITF Circuit. On 1 November 2010, she reached her best singles ranking of world No. 887. On 11 June 2012, she peaked at No. 823 in the doubles rankings.

Playing for Tunisia Fed Cup team, Abbès has a win–loss record of 16–5.

== ITF finals ==
=== Doubles (1–1) ===
Legend $25,000 tournaments $10,000 tournaments	Finals by surface Hard (0–1) Clay (1–0)

Result	Date	Tournament	Surface	Partner	Opponents	Score
Loss	30 October 2009	ITF Monastir, Tunisia	Hard	(Tunisia) Ons Jabeur	(Netherlands) Elise Tamaëla (Netherlands) Nicole Thyssen	1–6, 7–5, [4–10]
Win	23 July 2011	ITF Casablanca, Morocco	Clay	(Poland) Agata Barańska	(Mexico) Ximena Hermoso (Mexico) Ivette López	6–4, 6–2
