= Fatma Al-Nabhani =

Omani tennis player (born 1991)

Fatma Al Nabhani فاطمة النبهاني
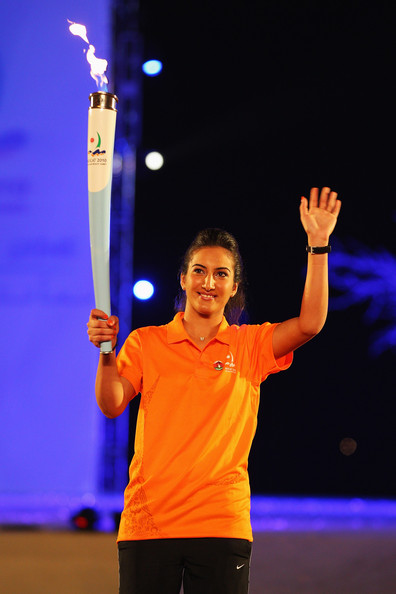
- Country (sports): Oman
- Residence: Muscat, Oman
- Born: 20 May 1991 (age 35) Muscat, Oman
- Height: 1.70 m (5 ft 7 in)
- Plays: Right (two-handed backhand)
- Prize money: $245,612

Singles
- Career record: 282–240
- Career titles: 10 ITF
- Highest ranking: No. 362 (4 October 2010)

Doubles
- Career record: 222–178
- Career titles: 14 ITF
- Highest ranking: No. 238 (28 April 2014)

Team competitions
- Fed Cup: 13–7

Fatma Al-Nabhani
Medal record

Women's Tennis

Representing Oman

Pan Arab Games
| Gold medal – first place | 2011 Doha | Singles |
| Bronze medal – third place | 2011 Doha | Doubles |
| Bronze medal – third place | 2011 Doha | Team |

Fatma Al-Nabhani (Arabic: فاطمة النبهاني; born 20 May 1991) is an Omani former tennis player.

In her career, she won 10 singles and 14 doubles titles on the ITF Women's Circuit. On 4 October 2010, she reached her best singles ranking of world No. 362. On 28 April 2014, she peaked at No. 238 in the doubles rankings.

Al-Nabhani made her WTA Tour main-draw debut at the 2009 Dubai Tennis Championships, having received a wildcard with Magali de Lattre in the doubles tournament, but they lost to Chan Yung-jan and Sun Tiantian in the first round.

Playing for Oman in Fed Cup competition, Al Nabhani reached a win–loss record of 13–7.

She is the younger sister of Mohammed Al-Nabhani, who is also a tennis player.

== ITF Circuit finals ==
=== Singles: 18 (10 titles, 8 runner-ups) ===
| Legend $15,000 tournaments $10,000 tournaments | Finals by surface Hard (8–3) Clay (2–5) |

| Result | W–L | Date | Tournament | Surface | Opponent | Score |
|---|---|---|---|---|---|---|
| Win | 1. | Mar 2010 | ITF Fujairah, United Arab Emirates | Hard | (Ukraine) Katerina Avdiyenko | 7–6^{(1)}, 6–1 |
| Loss | 1. | Jul 2010 | ITF Waterloo, Canada | Clay | (United States) Julia Cohen | 6–1, 5–7, 5–7 |
| Win | 2. | Apr 2012 | ITF Fujairah, U.A.E. | Hard | (India) Ankita Raina | 6–2, 6–3 |
| Loss | 2. | Sep 2012 | ITF Sharm El Sheikh, Egypt | Hard | (Switzerland) Belinda Bencic | 3–6, 6–7^{(4)} |
| Winner | 3. | Sep 2013 | ITF Sharm El Sheikh | Hard | (Russia) Yana Sizikova | 7–5, 6–3 |
| Win | 4. | Sep 2013 | ITF Sharm El Sheikh | Hard | (Russia) Anna Morgina | 6–4, 6–1 |
| Loss | 3. | Mar 2014 | ITF Manama, Bahrain | Hard | (Netherlands) Quirine Lemoine | 6–4, 1–6, 2–6 |
| Loss | 4. | Aug 2014 | ITF Bangalore, India | Hard | (Chinese Taipei) Hsu Ching-wen | 4–6, 4–6 |
| Win | 5. | Apr 2015 | ITF Manama, Bahrain | Hard | (Germany) Vivian Heisen | 6–4, 7–6^{(2)} |
| Win | 6. | May 2015 | ITF Heraklion, Greece | Hard | (Germany) Tayisiya Morderger | 7–5, 6–3 |
| Win | 7. | May 2015 | ITF Port El Kantaoui, Tunisia | Hard | (Russia) Ekaterina Kazionova | 6–1, 6–4 |
| Win | 8. | Sep 2015 | ITF Hyderabad, India | Clay | (India) Prerna Bhambri | 6–4, 6–0 |
| Win | 9. | Sep 2015 | ITF Hyderabad, India | Clay | (India) Rishika Sunkara | 6–3, 6–1 |
| Loss | 5. | Aug 2016 | ITF Las Palmas, Spain | Clay | (Australia) Samantha Harris | 7–6^{(4)}, 4–6, 6–7^{(7)} |
| Loss | 6. | Nov 2016 | ITF Casablanca, Morocco | Clay | (Spain) Georgina García Pérez | 4–6, 6–3, 2–6 |
| Loss | 7. | Nov 2016 | ITF Rabat, Morocco | Clay | (Spain) Georgina García Pérez | 3–6, 6–2, 1–6 |
| Loss | 8. | Jan 2017 | ITF Cairo, Egypt | Clay | (Belgium) Hélène Scholsen | 2–6, 5–7 |
| Win | 10. | Oct 2017 | ITF Hammamet, Tunisia | Clay | (Bulgaria) Isabella Shinikova | 6–3, 6–1 |

=== Doubles: 42 (14 titles, 28 runner-ups) ===
| Legend $25,000 tournaments $15,000 tournaments $10,000 tournaments | Finals by surface Hard (10–16) Clay (4–12) |

| Result | W–L | Date | Tournament | Surface | Partner | Opponents | Score |
|---|---|---|---|---|---|---|---|
| Win | 1. | 23 March 2008 | ITF Ain Sukhna, Egypt | Clay | (Morocco) Fatima El Allami | (Ukraine) Yelyzaveta Rybakova (France) Nadège Vergos | 6–4, 6–4 |
| Win | 2. | 21 November 2008 | ITF Dubai, U.A.E. | Hard | (Portugal) Magali de Lattre | (Russia) Alexandra Artamonova (Belarus) Vladislava Kuzmenkova | 6–2, 2–6, [10–3] |
| Loss | 1. | 22 November 2009 | ITF Cairo, Egypt | Clay | (Russia) Galina Fokina | (Romania) Mihaela Buzărnescu (France) Laura Thorpe | 4–6, 0–6 |
| Runner-up | 2. | 21 March 2010 | ITF Antalya, Turkey | Clay | (Chile) Andrea Koch Benvenuto | (Netherlands) Kiki Bertens (Netherlands) Daniëlle Harmsen | 2–6, 4–6 |
| Winner | 3. | 26 March 2010 | ITF Fujairah, U.A.E. | Hard | (Portugal) Magali de Lattre | (Italy) Martina Caciotti (Italy) Nicole Clerico | 2–6, 7–6^{(5)}, [10–8] |
| Runner-up | 3. | 12 June 2010 | ITF Iaşi, Romania | Clay | (Bulgaria) Biljana Pawlowa-Dimitrova | (Romania) Mădălina Gojnea (Romania) Ionela-Andreea Iova | 3–6, 3–6 |
| Winner | 4. | 6 August 2010 | ITF Gaziantep, Turkey | Hard | (Portugal) Magali de Lattre | (Australia) Jade Hopper (Australia) Daniela Scivetti | 6–3, 6–2 |
| Runner-up | 4. | 14 August 2010 | ITF Istanbul, Turkey | Hard | (Portugal) Magali de Lattre | (Turkey) Başak Eraydın (Bulgaria) Isabella Shinikova | 6–3, 3–6, [4–10] |
| Runner-up | 5. | 13 May 2011 | ITF New Delhi, India | Hard | (India) Rushmi Chakravarthi | (India) Aishwarya Agrawal (India) Ankita Raina | 4–6, 3–6 |
| Runner-up | 6. | 14 April 2012 | ITF Fujairah, U.A.E. | Hard | (India) Kyra Shroff | (Russia) Yana Sizikova (Germany) Anna Zaja | 4–6, 1–6 |
| Runner-up | 7. | 13 May 2012 | ITF Istanbul, Turkey | Hard | (Germany) Anna Zaja | (Turkey) Başak Eraydın (Turkey) Melis Sezer | 2–6, 6–3, [7–10] |
| Runner-up | 8. | 10 June 2012 | ITF El Paso, United States | Hard | (Bolivia) María Fernanda Álvarez Terán | (United States) Sanaz Marand (United States) Ashley Weinhold | 4–6, 3–6 |
| Runner-up | 9. | 1 July 2012 | ITF Buffalo, US | Clay | (United States) Jacqueline Cako | (Russia) Nika Kukharchuk (United States) Jamie Loeb | 6–1, 3–6, [8–10] |
| Runner-up | 10. | 30 September 2012 | ITF Sharm El Sheikh, Egypt | Hard | (Belarus) Lidziya Marozava | (Poland) Olga Brózda (China) Lu Jiaxiang | 5–7, 2–6 |
| Runner-up | 11. | 4 May 2013 | ITF Phuket, Thailand | Hard | (Chinese Taipei) Lee Ya-hsuan | (Thailand) Nicha Lertpitaksinchai (Thailand) Peangtarn Plipuech | 2–6, 4–6 |
| Runner-up | 12. | 2 June 2013 | ITF El Paso, US | Hard | (United States) Keri Wong | (Venezuela) Adriana Pérez (Mexico) Marcela Zacarías | 3–6, 3–6 |
| Runner-up | 13. | 7 July 2013 | ITF Middelburg, Netherlands | Clay | (Belarus) Sviatlana Pirazhenka | (Ukraine) Veronika Kapshay (Kyrgyzstan) Ksenia Palkina | 3–6, 3–6 |
| Runner-up | 14. | 8 September 2013 | ITF Sharm El Sheikh, Egypt | Hard | (Russia) Alina Mikheeva | (Russia) Anna Morgina (Russia) Yana Sizikova | 5–7, 6–1, [8–10] |
| Runner-up | 15. | 17 October 2013 | Lagos Open, Nigeria | Hard | (Romania) Cristina Dinu | (United Kingdom) Naomi Broady (United Kingdom) Emily Webley-Smith | 6–3, 4–6, [7–10] |
| Winner | 5. | 26 October 2013 | Lagos Open, Nigeria | Hard | (Italy) Gioia Barbieri | (Switzerland) Conny Perrin (South Africa) Chanel Simmonds | 1–6, 6–4, [10–8] |
| Runner-up | 16. | 25 May 2014 | ITF Tianjin, China | Hard | (India) Ankita Raina | (China) Liu Chang (China) Tian Ran | 1–6, 5–7 |
| Runner-up | 17. | 29 March 2015 | ITF Port El Kantaoui, Tunisia | Hard | (Bulgaria) Isabella Shinikova | (Germany) Carolin Daniels (Poland) Justyna Jegiołka | 5–7, 7–5, [5–10] |
| Winner | 6. | 4 April 2015 | ITF Manama, Bahrain | Hard | (Mexico) Camila Fuentes | (Greece) Stamatia Fafaliou (Germany) Jasmin Jebawy | 6–2, 7–6^{(3)} |
| Runner-up | 18. | 25 April 2015 | ITF Heraklion, Greece | Hard | (India) Sharmada Balu | (Hungary) Anna Bondár (Austria) Lisa-Maria Moser | 3–6, 5–7 |
| Winner | 7. | 2 May 2015 | ITF Heraklion, Greece | Hard | (Spain) Cristina Sánchez Quintanar | (Japan) Yoshimi Kawasaki (Romania) Daiana Negreanu | 6–4, 6–1 |
| Winner | 8. | 5 June 2015 | ITF Bangkok, Thailand | Hard | (Thailand) Nungnadda Wannasuk | (Thailand) Kamonwan Buayam (South Korea) Kim Dabin | 6–3, 7–5 |
| Runner-up | 19. | 15 August 2015 | ITF Sharm El Sheikh, Egypt | Hard | (Sweden) Anette Munozova | (Republic of Ireland) Jenny Claffey (Australia) Sara Tomic | 4–6, 0–6 |
| Winner | 9. | 24 August 2015 | ITF Port El Kantaoui, Tunisia | Hard | (Slovakia) Michaela Hončová | (Russia) Margarita Lazareva (Argentina) Sofía Luini | 6–2, 7–5 |
| Winner | 10. | 20 September 2015 | ITF Hyderabad, India | Clay | (India) Prerna Bhambri | (India) Sharmada Balu (India) Prarthana Thombare | 7–5, 6–2 |
| Winner | 11. | 28 November 2015 | ITF Rabat, Morocco | Clay | (Spain) Olga Parres Azcoitia | (France) Léa Tholey (Italy) Miriana Tona | 7–6^{(5)}, 7–5 |
| Runner-up | 20. | 7 February 2016 | GB Pro-Series Glasgow, UK | Hard (i) | (Germany) Anna Zaja | (Switzerland) Nina Stadler (Belgium) Kimberley Zimmermann | 2–6, 6–7^{(7)} |
| Runner-up | 21. | 21 July 2016 | ITF Saint-Gervais, France | Clay | (France) Estelle Cascino | (Australia) Abbie Myers (Australia) Ellen Perez | 6–7^{(5)}, 2–6 |
| Runner-up | 22. | 11 November 2016 | ITF Casablanca, Morocco | Clay | (Spain) Olga Parres Azcoitia | (Romania) Daiana Negreanu (Romania) Oana Georgeta Simion | 2–6, 1–6 |
| Runner-up | 23. | 18 November 2016 | ITF Rabat, Morocco | Clay | (Spain) Olga Parres Azcoitia | (Romania) Cristina Adamescu (Romania) Daiana Negreanu | 3–6, 6–1, [5–10] |
| Runner-up | 24. | 21 January 2017 | ITF Cairo, Egypt | Clay | (Egypt) Sandra Samir | (Japan) Ayaka Okuno (Slovakia) Chantal Škamlová | 6–4, 4–6, [6–10] |
| Runner-up | 25. | 28 January 2017 | ITF Cairo, Egypt | Clay | (Egypt) Sandra Samir | (Japan) Ayaka Okuno (Slovakia) Chantal Škamlová | 3–6, 1–6 |
| Runner-up | 26. | 24 March 2017 | ITF Le Havre, France | Clay (i) | (Romania) Daiana Negreanu | (Belgium) Elyne Boeykens (Belgium) Kimberley Zimmermann | 6–7^{(5)}, 3–6 |
| Runner-up | 27. | 5 May 2017 | ITF Hua Hin, Thailand | Hard | (Japan) Chihiro Muramatsu | (China) Chen Jiahui (China) Zhang Ying | 4–6, 1–6 |
| Runner-up | 28. | 11 August 2017 | ITF Las Palmas, Spain | Clay | (Spain) Arabela Fernández Rabener | (Spain) Carlota Molina Megías (Belarus) Anastasiya Yakimova | 4–6, 3–6 |
| Winner | 12. | 18 August 2017 | ITF Las Palmas, Spain | Clay | (Spain) Arabela Fernández Rabener | (Argentina) Victoria Bosio (Japan) Kana Daniel | 2–6, 7–5, [10–5] |
| Winner | 13. | 23 March 2018 | ITF Manama, Bahrain | Hard | (Philippines) Marian Capadocia | (Zimbabwe) Valeria Bhunu (United Kingdom) Emily Webley-Smith | 7–5, 6–2 |
| Winner | 14. | 25 December 2021 | ITF Giza, Egypt | Hard | (Netherlands) Jasmijn Gimbrère | (Greece) Sapfo Sakellaridi (Russia) Maria Sholokhova | 2–6, 6–3, [10–5] |

== See also ==
- Muslim women in sport
