= Ons Jabeur =

Tunisian tennis women player (born 1994)

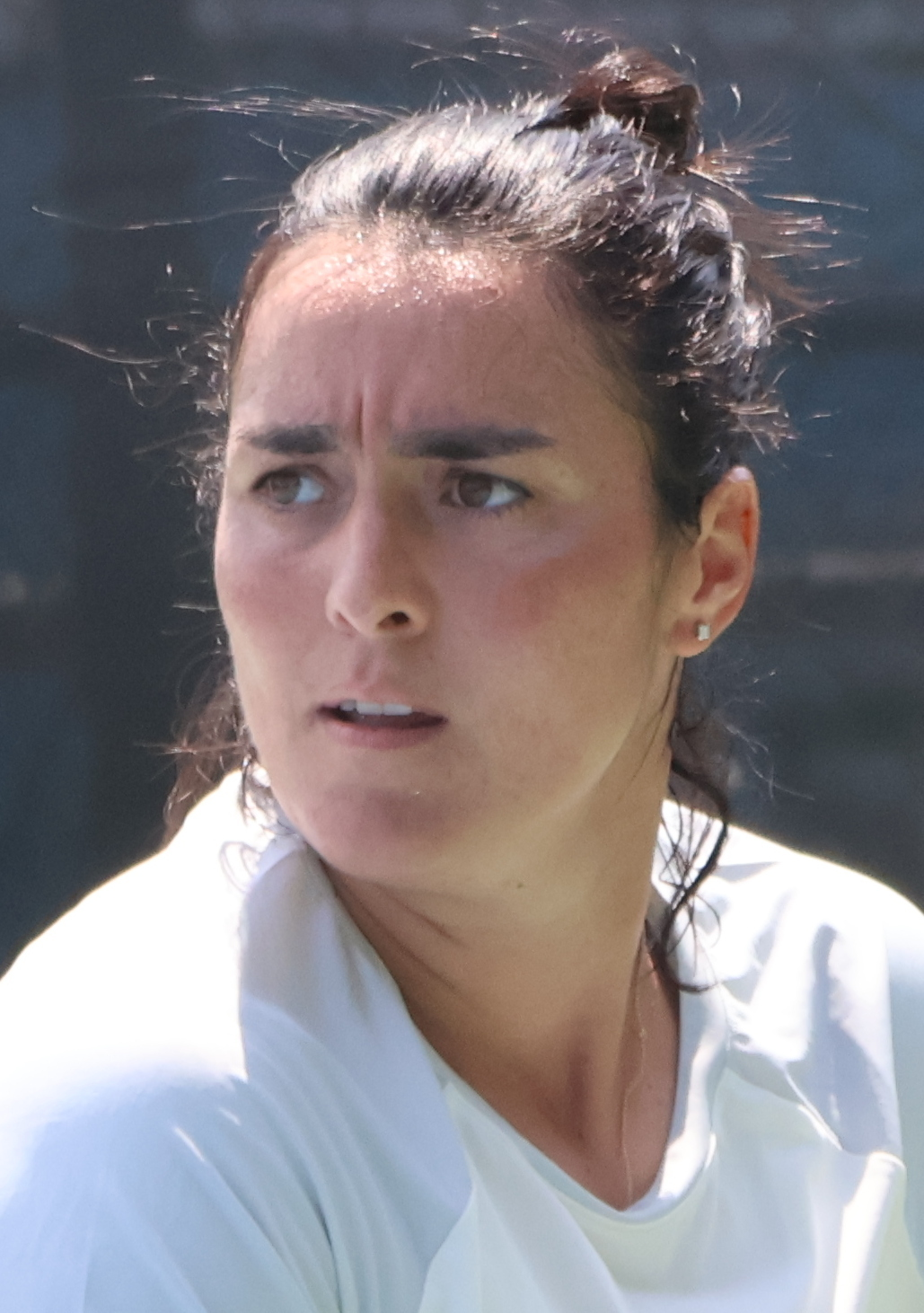
- Jabeur at the 2024 Washington Open
- Native name: أنس جابر
- Country (sports): Tunisia
- Residence: Sousse, Tunisia
- Born: 28 August 1994 (age 32) Ksar Hellal, Tunisia
- Height: 1.67 m (5 ft 6 in)
- Turned pro: 2010
- Plays: Right-handed (two-handed backhand)
- Coach: Issam Jellali
- Prize money: US$ 14,303,928: 47th in all-time rankings

Singles
- Career record: 460–261
- Career titles: 5
- Highest ranking: No. 2 (27 June 2022)

Grand Slam singles results
- Australian Open: QF (2020)
- French Open: QF (2023, 2024)
- Wimbledon: F (2022, 2023)
- US Open: F (2022)

Other tournaments
- Tour Finals: RR (2022, 2023)
- Olympic Games: 1R (2012, 2016, 2020)

Doubles
- Career record: 35–33
- Career titles: 0
- Highest ranking: No. 116 (3 February 2020)

Grand Slam doubles results
- Australian Open: 3R (2020)
- Wimbledon: 1R (2019)
- US Open: 2R (2019)

Team competitions
- Fed Cup: 37–13
Medal record
Representing Tunisia
Women's Tennis
All-Africa Games
Gold medal – first place	2011 Maputo	Singles
Gold medal – first place	2011 Maputo	Team event
Silver medal – second place	2011 Maputo	Doubles
Pan Arab Games
Gold medal – first place	2011 Doha	Team event
Bronze medal – third place	2011 Doha	Doubles

Ons Jabeur (Note: /ˈɒnz ʒəˈbɜːr/; Arabic: أُنْس جَابِر, romanized: ʾUns Jābir, pronounced [ˈuns dʒaːbir]) (born 28 August 1994) is a Tunisian inactive tennis player. She has been ranked as high as No. 2 in singles by the WTA, achieved on 27 June 2022, making her the highest-ranked African and Arab tennis player in WTA and ATP history. Jabeur has won five singles titles on WTA Tour, including a WTA 1000 event at the 2022 Madrid Open, and has been runner-up at three majors. She is the first African and Arab woman to contest a major final in singles.

Jabeur was first exposed to tennis by her mother at three years old. She became professional in her teenage years when she reached two junior major girls' singles finals at the French Open in 2010 and 2011, winning the latter and becoming the first African or Arab to win a junior major since 1964. After nearly a decade of playing primarily at the ITF level, she started competing more regularly on the WTA Tour in 2017. At the 2020 Australian Open, Jabeur became the first Arab woman to reach a major quarterfinal, a feat she repeated at the 2021 Wimbledon Championships. She became the first Arab woman to win a WTA Tour title at the 2021 Birmingham Classic. Jabeur then elevated her level in the summer of 2022, winning the 2022 Madrid Open for her biggest title, followed by two successive major finals at Wimbledon and the US Open. Reaching the world No. 2 position, she reached the Wimbledon final again the next year, before injury and form struggles led to declining results.

Jabeur's achievements are credited with raising the profile of tennis across the African continent. She won the Arab Woman of the Year award in 2019.

== Early life ==
Ons Jabeur was born to Samira and Ridha Jabeur in Ksar Hellal, a small town in Tunisia, on 28 August 1994. She grew up in the larger nearby coastal city of Sousse. Jabeur has two older brothers, Hatem and Marwen, and an older sister, Yasmine. Her mother played tennis recreationally and introduced her to the sport at the age of three. Jabeur trained under coach Nabil Mlika for ten years from ages four to thirteen, originally starting to work with him at a tennis promotion centre at her school. When she was ten years old, her club did not have its own tennis courts and she could only train on courts at nearby hotels. At twelve years old, Jabeur moved to the capital city of Tunis to train at the Lycée Sportif El Menzah, a national sport high school for the country's up-and-coming athletes, where she stayed for several years.

She also later trained in Belgium and France starting at the age of 16. Jabeur credits her parents for the sacrifices they made while raising her, saying, "My parents sacrificed a lot of things – my mom used to drive me everywhere around Tunisia to go play the tournaments, and she encouraged me to go to a special school to study. That was a big sacrifice to see her little girl going for a dream that, honestly, wasn't 100% guaranteed. She believed in me and gave me the confidence to be there."

== Career ==
=== Junior years ===
Jabeur began playing on the ITF Junior Circuit in August 2007 on the week of her 13th birthday. With compatriot Nour Abbès, she won the doubles event of her debut tournament, the Grade 5 Al Fatah ITF Junior Tournament in Lebanon. She defeated Abbès to win her first Grade 5 singles event at the 2009 Fujairah ITF Junior Tennis Championships in the United Arab Emirates, where she also won the doubles event with Abbès. Later in the year, she started to have more success at higher-level tournaments, finishing runner-up at the Grade 2 International Junior Championships of Morocco and winning the Grade 2 Smash International Junior Championships in Egypt, both in singles. She made her junior major debut at the 2009 US Open, losing her opening match to Laura Robson.

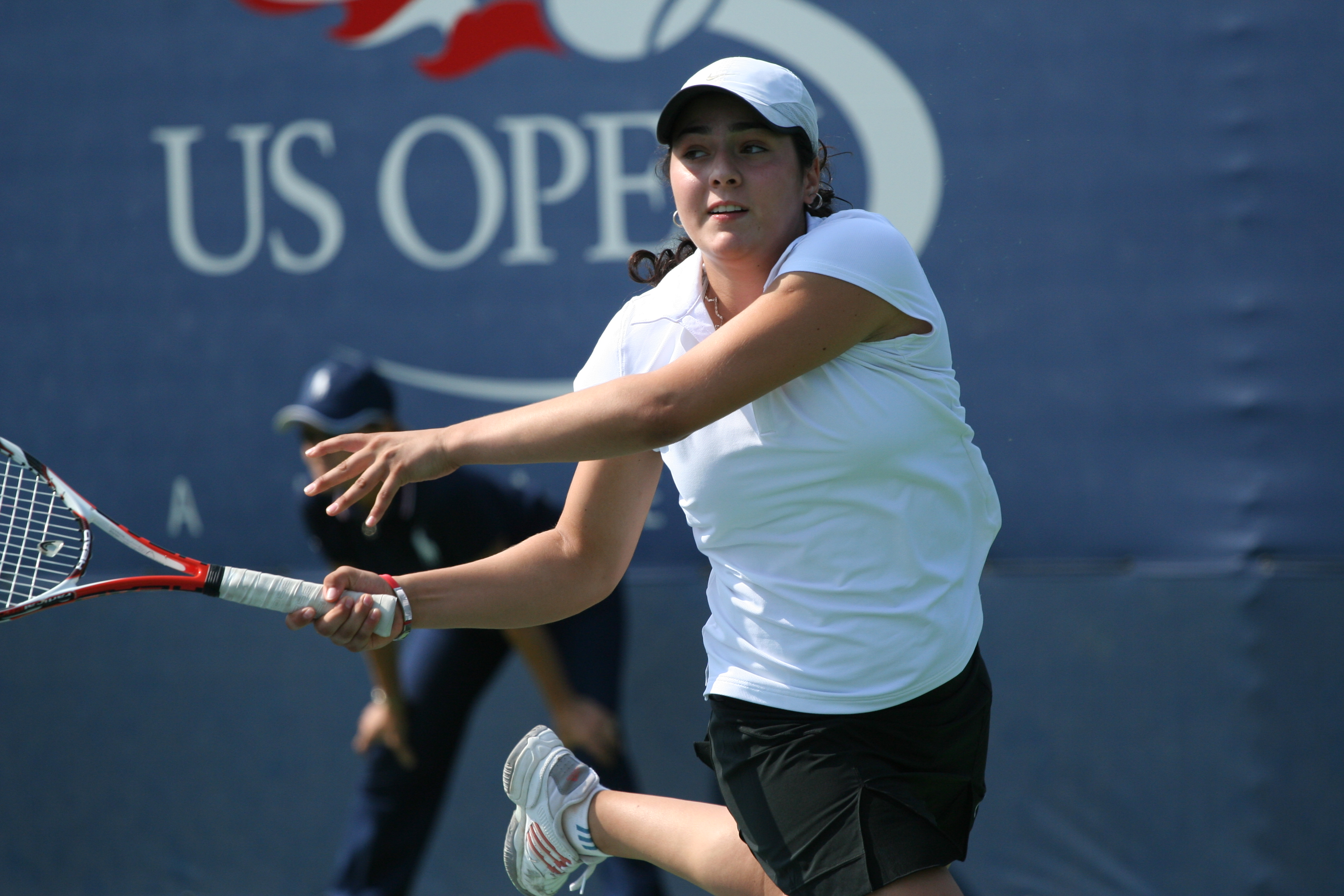
Jabeur at the US Open in 2009

Jabeur started to produce strong results at the junior majors and other Grade A events in May 2010. In the doubles event at the Trofeo Bonfiglio, she partnered with Charlène Seateun to reach the semifinals. Two weeks later, she played the 2010 French Open and upset third seed Irina Khromacheva in the semifinals before finishing runner-up to Elina Svitolina. She also performed well at Wimbledon, reaching the quarterfinals in singles and the semifinal in doubles. She lost to Yulia Putintseva in singles, and Khromacheva and Svitolina in doubles alongside Monica Puig. Putintseva defeated Jabeur again at the US Open. Jabeur entered the doubles event with Putintseva and lost in the quarterfinals to Khromacheva again, who had partnered with Daria Gavrilova. Following the US Open, Jabeur had left wrist surgery in November that kept her out for five months until April 2011.

The last two singles events of Jabeur's junior career were the 2011 French Open and the 2011 Wimbledon Championships. At the French Open, she won her only junior major title to become the first North African woman to win a junior Grand Slam tournament. As the ninth seed, she upset top seed Daria Gavrilova in the quarterfinals, third seed Caroline Garcia in the semifinals, and then fifth seed Monica Puig in the final. This title helped her rise to No. 4 in the world in the junior rankings. She also became the first Arab girl to win a junior major singles title in history, and the first junior in general since Ismail El Shafei won the Wimbledon boys' title in 1964. Jabeur also entered the doubles event at the Grade 1 Junior International Roehampton, which she won while partnering with Ashleigh Barty.

=== 2008–12: Professional & WTA Tour debut ===
Jabeur began playing on the ITF Women's Circuit in 2008 at the age of 14. In October 2009, she finished runner-up in both singles and doubles at a 10k tournament in Monastir near her hometown, losing to Elise Tamaëla in both events. She won her first title in singles in May 2010 in Antalya, Turkey. She then won the singles and doubles events at another 10k tournament in Casablanca, Morocco two months later.

After having left wrist surgery at the end of the year and winning a junior major title, Jabeur moved up to the 25k and 50k levels in the summer of 2011. She made her WTA Tour main-draw debut at the age of 17 as a wildcard at the Premier 5 Qatar Ladies Open in February 2012, where she lost her first career match to No. 103 Virginie Razzano, in three sets. She was also given a wildcard into the qualifying competition at the Dubai Tennis Championships the following week. Although she did not qualify, she upset world No. 33 Zheng Jie with a ranking of No. 1169. Jabeur did not have much success at the ITF Circuit in 2012, only reaching one final, which came in singles and was her first at the $25k level. She also entered qualifying at the French Open, but only won one match. Jabeur finished the year ranked No. 260 in the world.

=== 2013–16: Top 200 at the ITF Circuit level ===
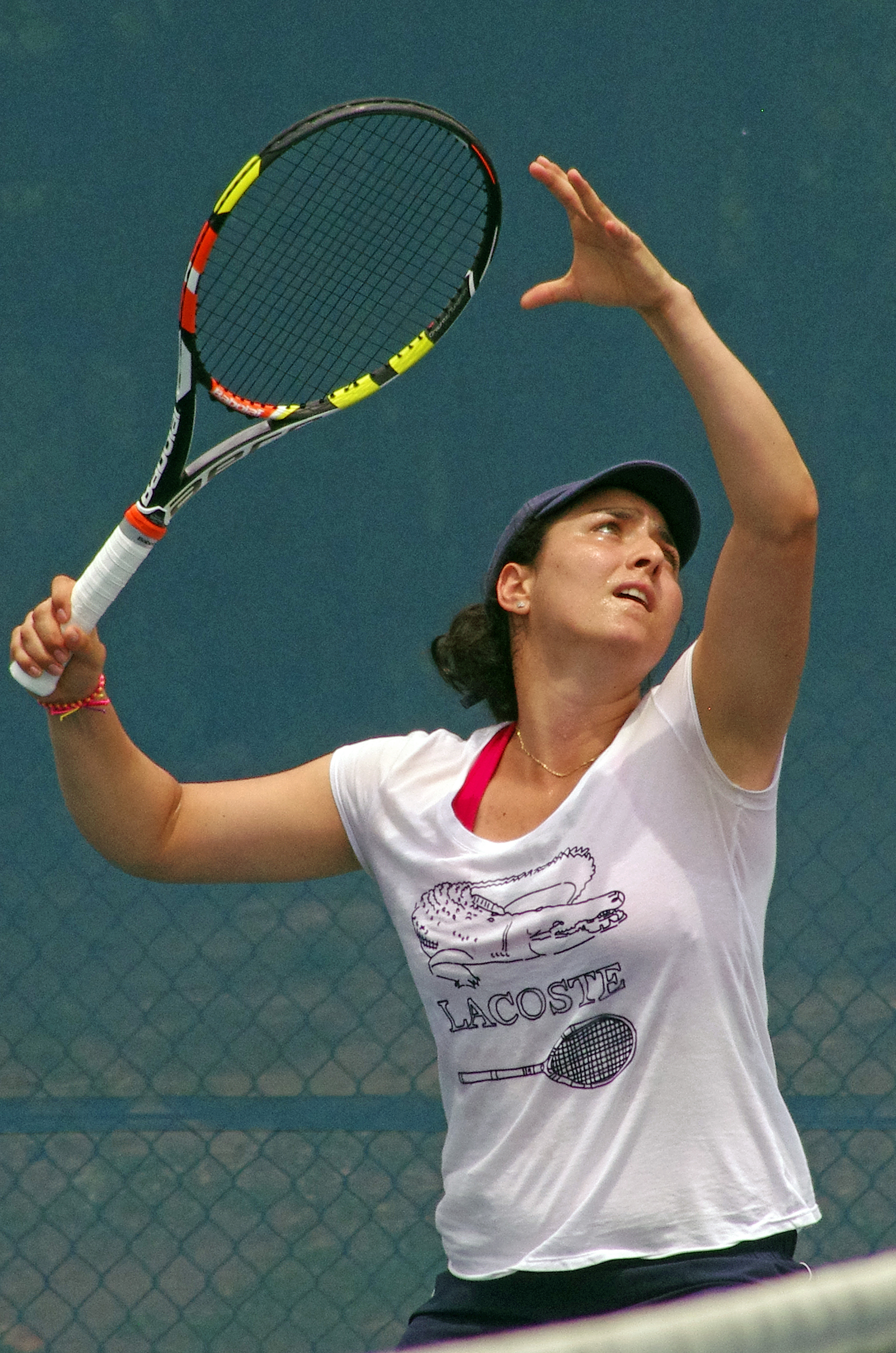
Jabeur in 2015

After a slow start to 2013, Jabeur won her first $25k title in April 2013 in Tunis. She then won back-to-back $50k titles over An-Sophie Mestach in Japan in May to bring her into the top 200 for the first time. In July, Jabeur played in her second WTA Tour main draw at the Baku Cup. She upset top seed, defending champion, and world No. 37, Bojana Jovanovski, in the second round, before losing in the quarterfinals to Magda Linette. She entered the qualifying competitions at Wimbledon and the US Open, losing her opening match in both events. A third $50k title at the Challenger de Saguenay with a win in the final over CoCo Vandeweghe took her to a new career-high of 139. In 2014, she played the main draw in the Malaysian Open losing to Giulia Gatto-Monticone in the first round.

Jabeur stayed inside the top 200 for most of the next three years, but could not enter the top 100, reaching a career-best ranking of 118 in 2015. She continued to play a mix of ITF and WTA events but played primarily at the ITF level. Her only ITF title in 2014 came at a $25k event in Tunis, and she did not win any titles in 2015. She finished runner-up twice in 2014, with the higher-level result coming at the $50k Open Nantes Atlantique, losing to Kateřina Siniaková. After losing in qualifying at the French Open and Wimbledon, Jabeur qualified for two major main draws in a row at the 2014 US Open and the 2015 Australian Open. She lost her opening matches at both tournaments to No. 19 Andrea Petkovic and Vera Zvonareva, respectively. With no titles, finals, or semifinals in 2015, her year-end ranking dropped to No. 210. Jabeur rebounded with two $25k titles in January 2016. A $50k title at the Nana Trophy in Tunis helped her return to the top 200 for all but one week through the rest of the season. Nonetheless, she lost in qualifying at both Wimbledon and the US Open and did not have a strong second half of the season. She finished the year at No. 193.

=== 2017–18: First WTA Tour final, top 100 ===
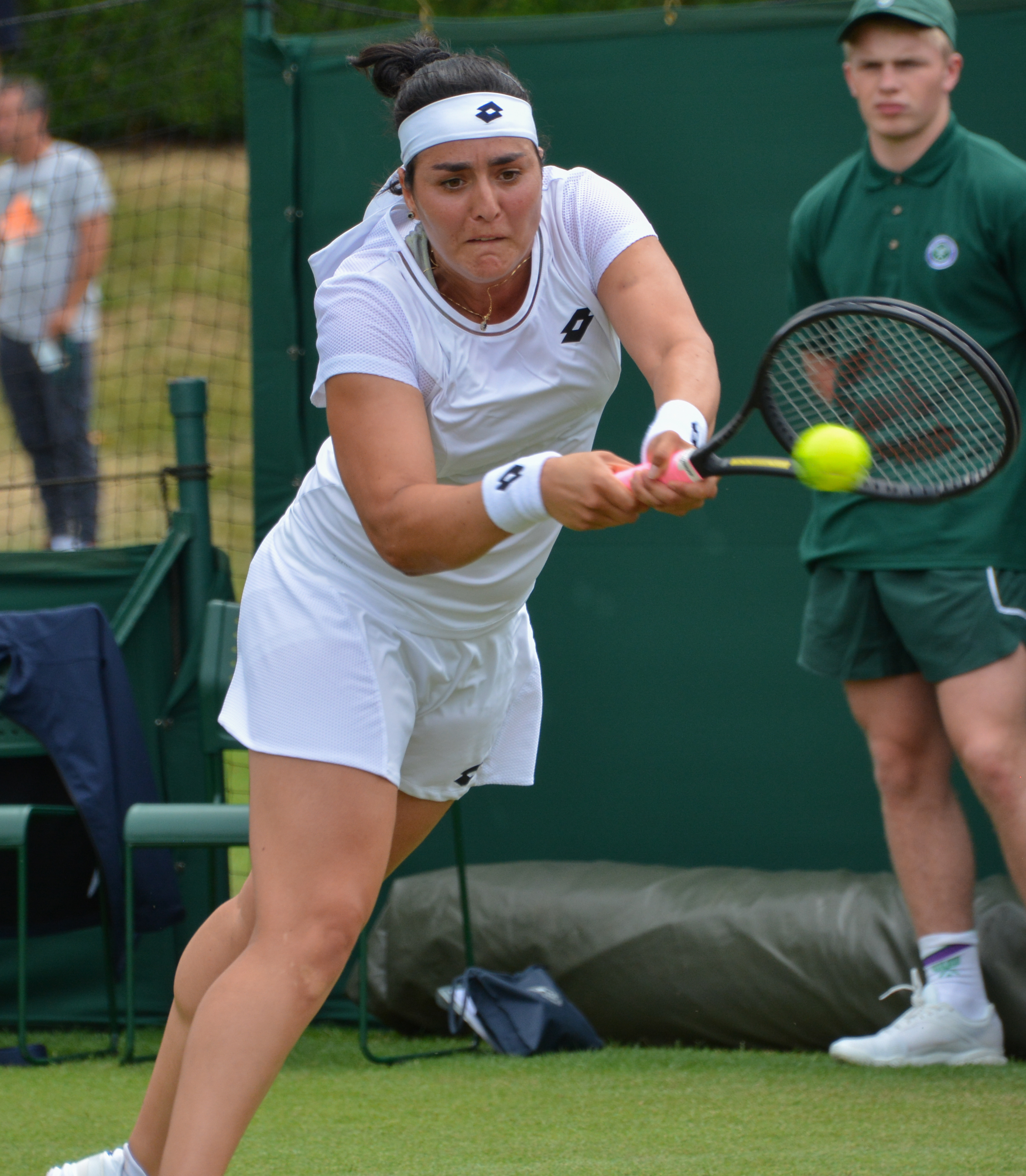
Jabeur at Wimbledon qualifying in 2017

Jabeur participated in all four major singles events in 2017 for the first time. After losing in the last round of qualifying at the Australian Open, she reached the French Open main draw as a lucky loser, the Wimbledon main draw as a qualifier, and the US Open main draw as a direct acceptance. She began to rise back up the rankings at the Premier-level Dubai Tennis Championships, where she qualified for the main draw and upset world No. 22, Anastasia Pavlyuchenkova, in the first round. This result brought her from No. 171 to No. 137.

After moderate success at the $60k level, Jabeur's next big breakthrough came at the French Open. As a lucky loser, she won two main-draw matches, including an upset of world No. 7, Dominika Cibulková, in the second round for her first top-10 victory. She lost in the third round to Timea Bacsinszky. At the end of July, she made her top-100 debut. Her only other major main-draw match-win of the year was a first-round win over American wildcard entrant Brienne Minor at the US Open, which cemented her place in the top 100 for the rest of the year.

Jabeur fell out of the top 100 in February 2018. She did not win her first match of the year until she reached the quarterfinals at the 60k Space Coast Pro Classic in April. After she lost in qualifying at the French Open, she dropped down to No. 180 in the world. Jabeur regained some of her ranking points when she won her first $100k title at the Manchester Trophy, bringing her back to No. 133.

With this title, she also earned a wildcard into the main draw at Wimbledon. She won her only Grand Slam tournament main-draw match of the year at Wimbledon over Viktorija Golubic, who she defeated for the third time in the span of a month. Jabeur ended her season with the best result of her career to date. As a qualifier at the Premier-level Kremlin Cup, she finished runner-up to world No. 14, Daria Kasatkina. She defeated three top-25 players in the tournament, including No. 8 Sloane Stephens and No. 11 Anastasija Sevastova. With this result, she returned to the top 100 at a career-high of No. 62 in the world.

=== 2019: US Open third round ===
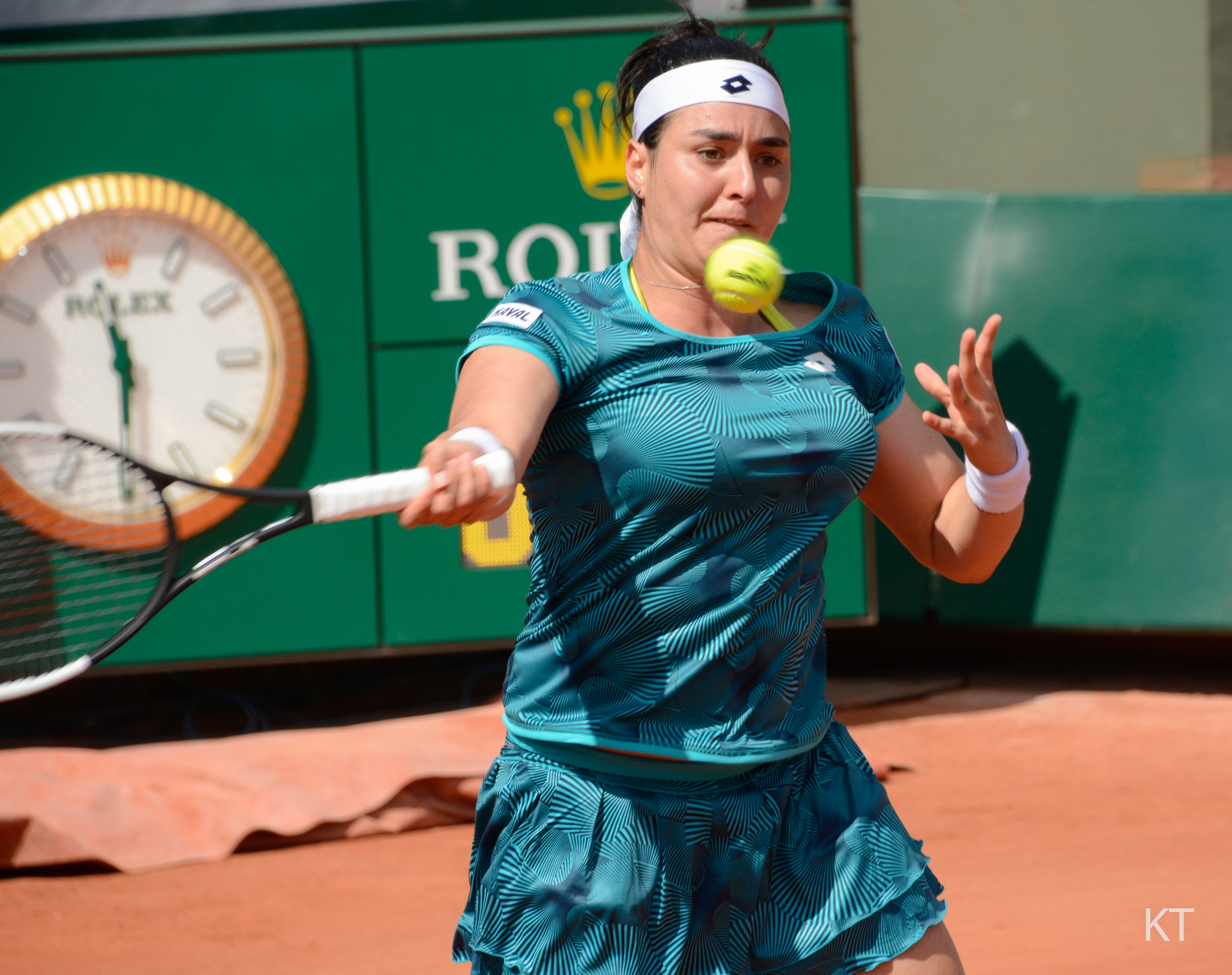
Jabeur at the 2019 French Open

Jabeur played all four major main draws for the first time in 2019, and stayed in the top 100 the entire year. She lost in the first round at the first three Grand Slam tournaments of the season, and did not win multiple main draw matches at any tournaments until after the French Open in May. Jabeur had a better second half of the season. She reached the semifinals at the Premier-level Eastbourne International, where she upset home favourite and world No. 19, Johanna Konta. She withdrew before the semifinal match due to a right ankle injury.

Jabeur's next big result came at the US Open where she defeated No. 27 Caroline Garcia and then Aliaksandra Sasnovich to reach the third round at a major tournament for the second time in her career. She lost a tight three-set match to world No. 3, Karolína Plíšková, in the third round. With this success, she reached a career-high ranking of No. 51. The only other tournament of the year where Jabeur won multiple main-draw matches was the Tianjin Open in October. She defeated three players including No. 36 Yulia Putintseva, before losing to Rebecca Peterson in her second semifinal of the year.

=== 2020: A major quarterfinal, top 50 ===
Jabeur had a major breakthrough at the Australian Open. After defeating Johanna Konta and Caroline Garcia in the first two rounds, she beat Caroline Wozniacki in three sets in the last match of Wozniacki's career. Jabeur defeated a fourth top 50 player in succession in Wang Qiang before losing to eventual champion Sofia Kenin in the quarterfinals. With this result, she made her top-50 debut, and also became the first Arab woman to reach a Grand Slam quarterfinal.

The following month, Jabeur continued her progress after receiving two wildcards to both Premier tournaments in the Middle East. She held a match point against No. 2, Simona Halep, in a second-round loss at Dubai. She then reached the quarterfinals at the Qatar Ladies Open, where she upset world No. 3, Karolína Plíšková, in the third round. After the COVID-19 season suspension, Jabeur continued her good form at a major level by reaching the third round of the US Open and the fourth round of the French Open for the first time in her career. She finished the year as world No. 31, her highest year-end ranking thus far.

=== 2021: First career title, major quarterfinal & top 10 ===
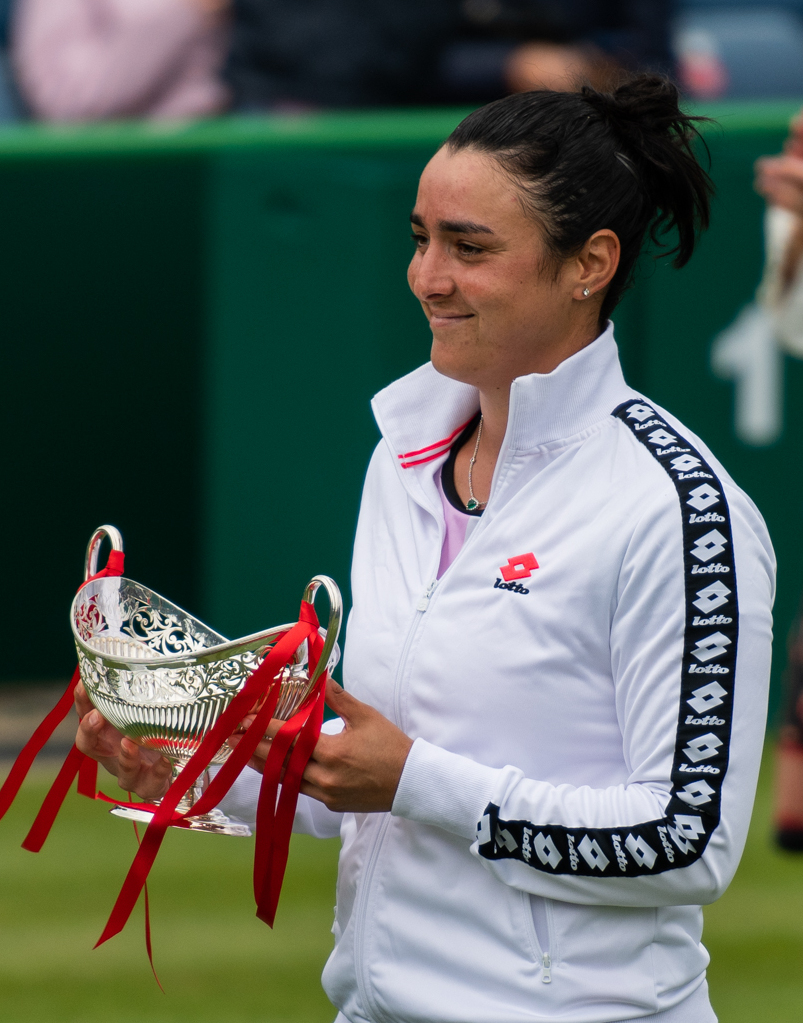
Jabeur holding the 2021 Birmingham Classic trophy

Jabeur participated in both tournaments of the Charleston Open, reaching the semifinal at the Volvo Car Open, and the final of the second, the MUSC Health Women's Open, which she lost to Australian Astra Sharma. She reached a career-high ranking of world No. 24 on 10 May 2021. Seeded 25th at the French Open, she took her revenge by defeating Sharma to advance to the third round of a major for a sixth straight time. She also defeated Magda Linette to reach the fourth round for a second time at this major where she lost to 24th seed Coco Gauff. Seeded second, Jabeur reached the third final in her career and made history as the first Arab woman to win a WTA Tour title at the Birmingham Classic by defeating Daria Kasatkina. At the same tournament, partnering with Ellen Perez, Jabeur also reached her first doubles final, losing to Marie Bouzková and Lucie Hradecká.

At Wimbledon, Jabeur, seeded 21st, defeated five-time champion Venus Williams to become the first Tunisian tennis player, first Arab woman, and the first woman representing an African country since Cara Black from Zimbabwe in 2005, to reach the third round (or quarterfinals) at Wimbledon. This also marked her seventh consecutive third-round appearance at a major. She continued her run when, despite vomiting at the side of the court when at match point, she defeated former Wimbledon champion and 11th seed, Garbiñe Muguruza, to reach the fourth round, coming back from a set down to reach the second week and round of 16 for the first time.

The day before, Tunisian supporters who flocked to Wimbledon burst into song — the national soccer team song, because there isn't one for tennis — and shouted her name after her fourth-round victory over 2020 French Open champion Iga Świątek. She defeated seventh seed Iga Świątek (making another comeback from the first set down) to reach the quarterfinals, where she lost to second seed and also first-time quarterfinalist Aryna Sabalenka. As a result, she recorded a career-high ranking of No. 22, on 26 July 2021.

To begin the US Open Series, Jabeur played the Canadian Open seeded 13th, beating Clara Burel, Daria Kasatkina, and defending champion Bianca Andreescu before losing in the quarterfinals to Jessica Pegula in three sets. With this result, she made her top 20 debut the week of 16 August 2021. At Indian Wells, Jabeur reached her first WTA 1000 semifinal by defeating Anett Kontaveit in the quarterfinals. With the win, she propelled herself into a career-high ranking, becoming the first Arab tennis player to reach the top 10 in either ATP or WTA rankings history. After the withdrawal of Emma Raducanu from the exhibition event World Tennis Championship, Jabeur was given her place. She won the tournament, defeating Belinda Bencic in the final.

=== 2022: Two major finals and world No. 2 ===
Jabeur started her season at the Sydney International. She defeated Astra Sharma in the first round and Petra Kvitová in the second round before losing to Anett Kontaveit in the quarterfinals. She subsequently withdrew from the Australian Open due to a back injury sustained in the Sydney tournament. In February, Jabeur played the Dubai Championships, where she defeated former world No. 2, Vera Zvonareva and Jessica Pegula, before falling to former No. 1, Simona Halep in the quarterfinals. She then entered the Qatar Ladies Open. After a first round bye, she defeated Aliaksandra Sasnovich and Tereza Martincová before falling to Kontaveit again in the quarterfinals.

At the Indian Wells Open, Jabeur received a bye into the second round where she was upset by Daria Saville in three sets. She reached the fourth round at the Miami Open, falling to 2022 Australian Open finalist Danielle Collins in straight sets. Jabeur reached her first final of the year at the Charleston Open, where she fell to Belinda Bencic in three sets. In Stuttgart, she was defeated by Paula Badosa in the quarterfinals. Seeded eighth at the Madrid Open, the world No. 10 reached her first WTA 1000 final, besting Belinda Bencic and Simona Halep, before defeating Ekaterina Alexandrova in the semifinals to become the first Arab player to reach a final at this level. She defeated Jessica Pegula in the final to become the first African player to win a WTA 1000 title, the ninth different winner at the Madrid Open and the 38th different winner in a WTA 1000 tournament (since 2009). At the Italian Open, she reached her second consecutive WTA 1000 final, defeating Sorana Cîrstea, Ajla Tomljanović, Yulia Putintseva, and fourth seed Maria Sakkari, before saving a match point in the semifinals against Daria Kasatkina for her 11th straight win. In the final, she lost to Iga Świątek in straight sets. By reaching the final at the Italian Open, Jabeur set a career-high ranking of world No. 6, on 16 May 2022. After having an excellent clay-court season, she then participated in the French Open, where she drew Magda Linette in the first round. She was shockingly defeated by Linette, after having a set and a break lead in the second set. Despite this, she reached a career-high ranking of world No. 4, on 6 June 2022, following the conclusion of the tournament.

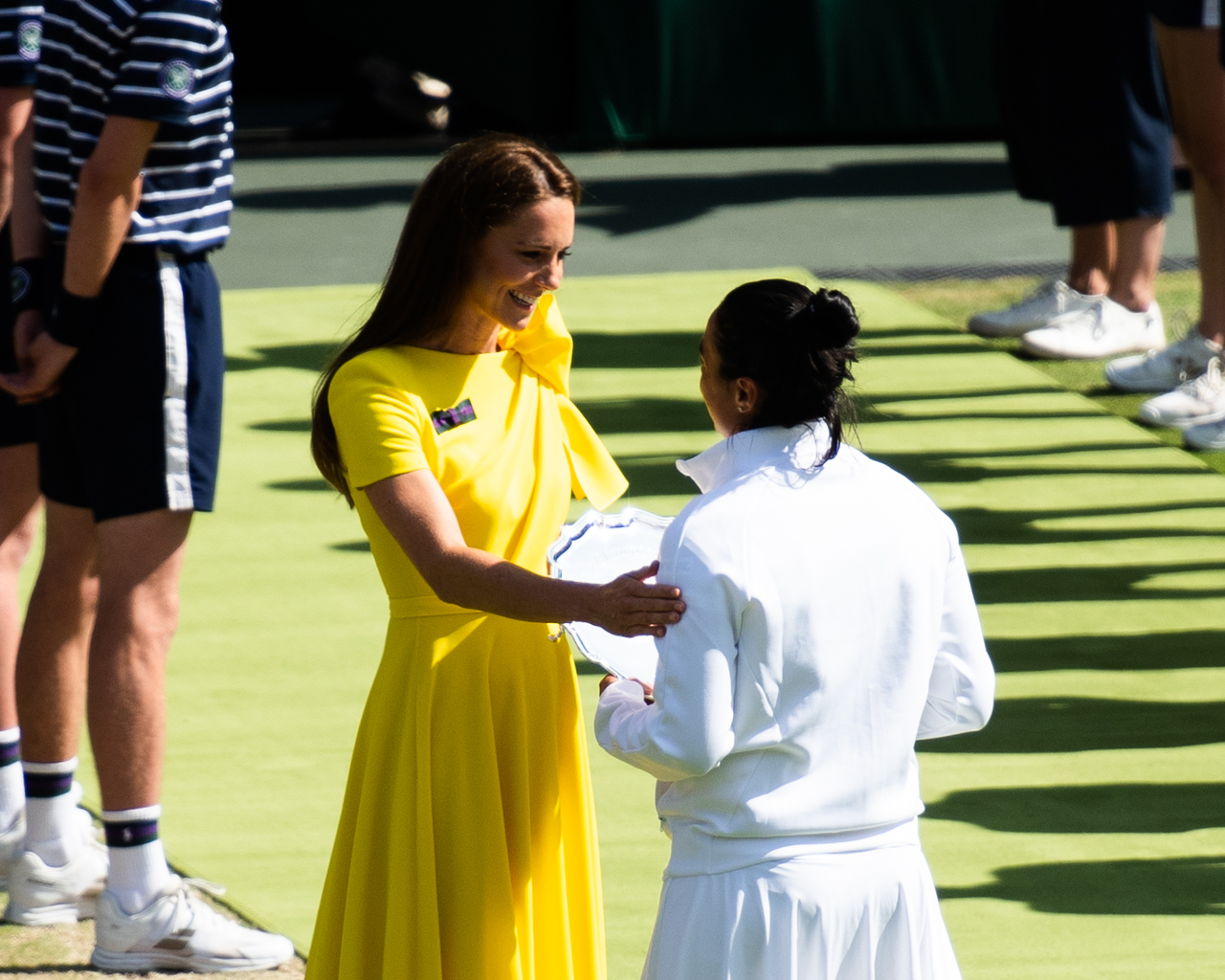
Ons Jabeur receives the 2022 Wimbledon Championships Finalist Shield from Kate Middleton, then the Duchess of Cambridge.

As the top seed, she won the German Open in Berlin after Belinda Bencic retired in the second set of the final. As a result, she moved to a new career-high ranking of world No. 3, on 20 June 2022. Jabeur initially entered the Eastbourne International singles draw seeded second, but withdrew before the tournament. Jabeur remained in the doubles draw as a wildcard, in which she partnered with Serena Williams, who was playing her first tournament since 2021 Wimbledon. Jabeur and Williams won their first-round match against Marie Bouzková and Sara Sorribes Tormo to set up a quarterfinal against Shuko Aoyama and Chan Hao-ching. They then reached the semifinals but Jabeur withdrew before their match with Magda Linette and Aleksandra Krunić citing a right knee injury. She achieved a new career-high in the singles rankings of world No. 2, on 27 June 2022, which was the highest-ranking for any African and Arab tennis player in WTA and ATP rankings history.

In London, she reached her second consecutive Wimbledon quarterfinal, defeating Mirjam Björklund, Katarzyna Kawa, Diane Parry and 24th seed Elise Mertens. Defeating Marie Bouzková in the quarterfinal, she became the first Arab or North African woman ever to reach the semifinals of a major tournament. After that, she defeated Tatjana Maria to reach her maiden final at a major, which made her the first African woman, and the first Arab or North African player, in the Open Era to enter a major final in singles. In the final, she lost to Elena Rybakina in three sets. Despite this, Wimbledon did not receive points due to athletes representing Russia and Belarus being banned from the tournament because of Russia's invasion of Ukraine.

Leading up to the US Open during the North American summer, Jabeur lost in the second round of the Silicon Valley Classic and retired in her first-round match against Zheng Qinwen at the Canadian Open. At Cincinnati, Jabeur lost in the second round to Petra Kvitová, in three sets. At the US Open, she regained her form, advancing to the quarterfinals for the first time at this major defeating 31st seed Shelby Rogers, and then 18th seed Veronika Kudermetova in straight sets to record her first victory over the Russian in four meetings. She became the third African woman to make it into the quarterfinals of the US Open in the Open era – and the first from the northern part of the continent. The other African women to reach the US Open quarterfinals are Maryna Godwin (1968) and Amanda Coetzer (1994, 1996 and 1998), both from South Africa. However, although she eventually managed to reach the final (making her the first African woman and the first Arab woman to do so), she lost against Iga Świątek, in straight sets. Unlike Wimbledon, Jabeur received 1,300 points in the tournament.

Jabeur recorded her first win at a WTA Tour event in Africa against Ann Li at the inaugural edition of the WTA 250 tennis tournament in Monastir, which she helped start in her home country. She was eventually defeated by Claire Liu in the quarterfinals. Jabeur made her debut at the WTA Finals in Fort Worth. She defeated Jessica Pegula in her second match of the group stage in three sets. However, she finished her campaign in the round-robin stage as she lost two out of her three matches against Aryna Sabalenka and Maria Sákkari, respectively. She ended the best season of her career ranked No. 2 in the WTA rankings.

=== 2023: Two WTA Tour titles, second Wimbledon final ===
She started the year with two victories against Sorana Cîrstea and Ukrainian qualifier Marta Kostyuk in Adelaide International 1. She was defeated in the semifinals by 18-year old qualifier Linda Nosková, 102nd in the world, in three sets. In mid-January, she competed in the Australian Open and, defeating Tamara Zidanšek in three sets, she came up against Markéta Vondroušová. After an absence for a right knee injury which was treated by surgery, she returned to the circuit in March at Indian Wells, but lost in the third round against Vondroušová, after beating Magdalena Fręch. She fell in the first round of Miami the following week, beaten by Russian qualifier Varvara Gracheva.

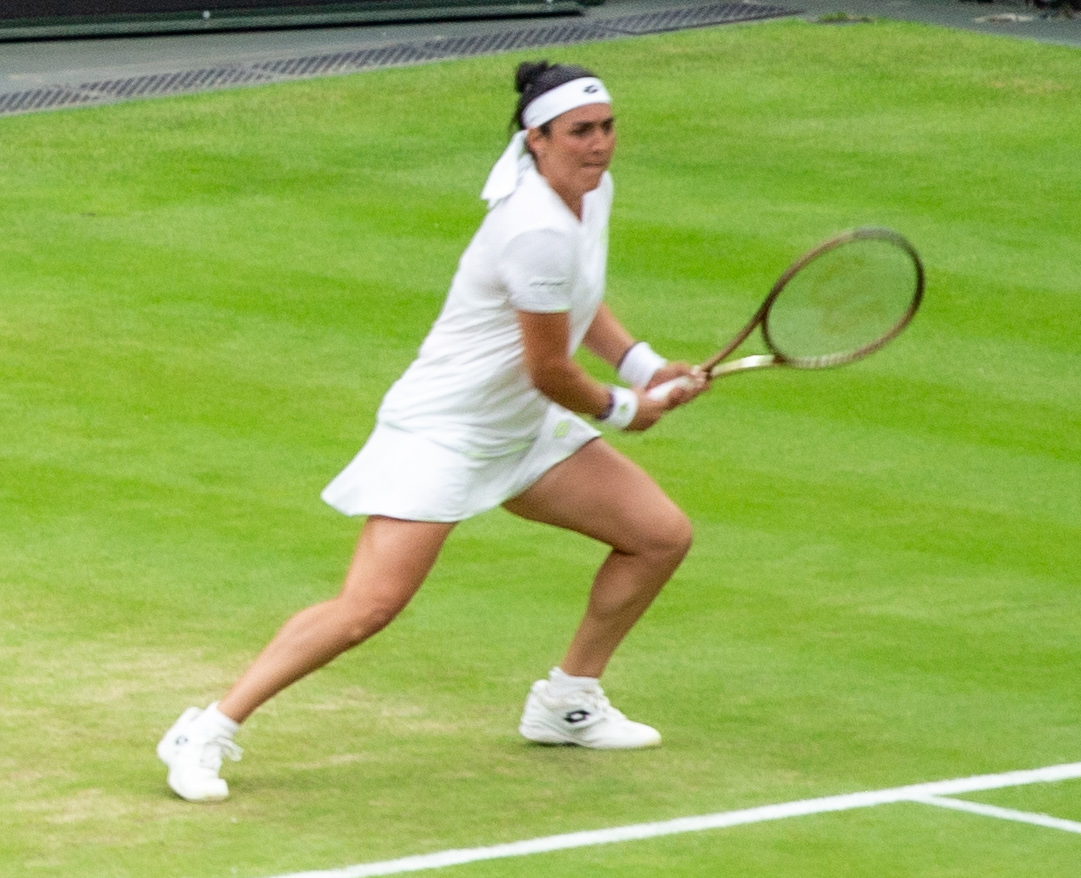
Jabeur at Wimbledon, 2023

In April, she won the Charleston Open by defeating in the final Belinda Bencic, taking her revenge for the previous year loss in the final. She reached the final without losing a set, with wins over Lesia Tsurenko, Caroline Dolehide, Anna Kalinskaya and Daria Kasatkina. She took part in the Stuttgart Grand Prix two weeks later and took out former Roland Garros winner Jeļena Ostapenko and Beatriz Haddad Maia but had to retire in the semifinal against top seed Iga Świątek, after three games due to a left calf injury. This injury also forced her to give up defending her title at the Madrid Open. She returned to the Italian Open but lost in the first match against former world No. 2, Paula Badosa.

At Roland Garros, she eliminated the Italian Lucia Bronzetti, the local Océane Dodin, the last Frenchwoman in the running, and Olga Danilović, both out of the top 100 to join as in 2020 and 2021 the round of 16 Porte d'Auteuil. She finds the American Bernarda Pera, a novice at this stage. She dismisses her and goes to the quarterfinals for the first time in her career in the tournament. Against Haddad Maia, the match was more complicated and she was overthrown after a long duel.

As defending champion in Berlin, she lost in the first round against the German qualifier Jule Niemeier, and in the second round in Eastbourne, she was beaten by Camila Giorgi. At Wimbledon, Jabeur managed to eliminate four Grand Slam champions on her way to the final including Bianca Andreescu in the third round, Petra Kvitová in the fourth, defending champion Elena Rybakina in the quarterfinals, and world No. 2, Aryna Sabalenka, in the semifinals. However, she lost in straight sets to world No. 42, Markéta Vondroušová in the final, which she described as the "most painful loss" in her career.

She won her fifth title defeating Diana Shnaider in the final of the 2023 Ningbo Open.

=== 2024: Second consecutive French Open quarterfinal, shoulder injury ===
At the Australian Open, Jabeur lost in the second round for a second consecutive year, this time to the 16-year old Mirra Andreeva who was making her tournament debut and ranked No. 47 at the time. This was also Andreeva's first top-10 win in her career.

At the French Open, she reached the quarterfinals for a second consecutive time, with wins over wildcard Sachia Vickery, Camila Osorio, 31st seed Leylah Fernandez and Clara Tauson. She lost to third seed Coco Gauff.

At the beginning of the grass season, as the top seed, she reached also the quarterfinals at the Nottingham Open with a win over qualifier Linda Fruhvirtová. Seeded eight, she reached a third quarterfinal in a row at the Berlin Open, with wins over qualifier Wang Xinyu and Linda Nosková.

She went out in the third round of Wimbledon, losing to Elina Svitolina. Jabeur withdrew from the US Open due to a shoulder injury. The same injury forced her to pull out of the China Open in September when she also announced she would end her season early and indicated she intended to return to the court in Australia in 2025.

=== 2025: Back-to-back quarterfinals, hiatus ===
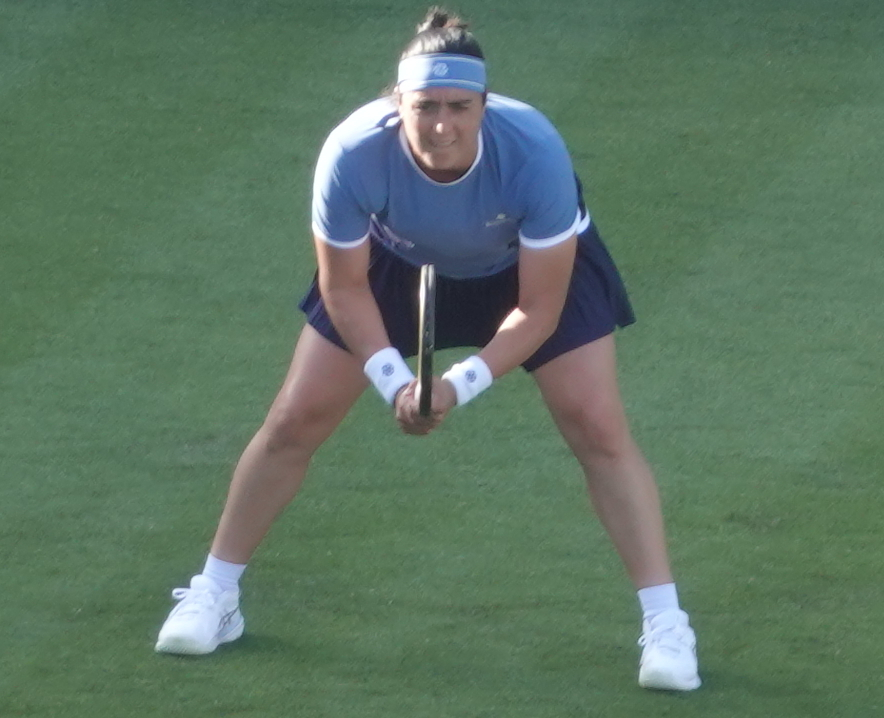
Ons Jabeur at the 2025 Eastbourne Open

Jabeur made her comeback at the Australian Open, securing wins over Anhelina Kalinina and Camila Osorio, before losing to eighth seed Emma Navarro in the third round.

In February, she reached back-to-back quarterfinals defeating seventh seed Jeļena Ostapenko and qualifier Wakana Sonobe to reach the last eight at the Abu Dhabi Open, where her run was ended by top seed Elena Rybakina, and overcoming seventh seed Zheng Qinwen and wildcard entrant Sofia Kenin to make it through to the same stage at the Qatar Ladies Open, where it was Jeļena Ostapenko who eliminated her.

Jabeur went out in the first round at both the French Open and Wimbledon.

In July, Jabeur announced she was taking an indefinite break from professional tennis, saying she had not "felt happy on court for some time" and it was time "to take a step back."

On 10 November, Jabeur announced her pregnancy and that she was expecting her first child. Later that month, it was announced that Jabeur and her longtime coach Issam Jellali would be joining the team of Turkish tennis player Zeynep Sönmez as a mentor and her head coach, respectively, in the 2026 season.

== National representation ==
=== Fed Cup / BJK Cup ===
Jabeur represented Tunisia at the Junior Fed Cup in 2009 alongside Nour Abbès and Sonia Daggou. The team finished third place in their round robin group that also included Mexico, China, and Germany. Although Jabeur lost all three of her singles rubbers, Tunisia won their tie against Mexico after Abbès won her singles match and Jabeur teamed up with Abbès to win the decisive doubles rubber. Tunisia finished in 11th place out of 16 teams overall, losing their first 9th-to-12th place tie to Indonesia, but winning their second 9th-to-12th place tie against Australia. Jabeur and Abbès won both singles rubbers in that last tie.

Jabeur made her senior Fed Cup debut for Tunisia in 2011, representing the team from 2011 to 2013, and again from 2016 through 2019. She has played in 29 ties, compiling an overall record of 32–11 split between 24–5 in singles and 8–6 in doubles. Her 24 singles wins are tied with Selima Sfar for the most in Tunisia Fed Cup history. When Jabeur debuted for Tunisia, they were in Europe/Africa Zone Group III. They were promoted to Zone Group II for 2013 after winning all five of their round robin ties and a play-off tie against Ireland in 2012. They were again promoted to Zone Group I for 2014 the following year, winning a play-off tie over Lithuania. However, Tunisia ultimately did not participate in the Fed Cup in 2014 or 2015, which was concurrent with Tunisia's one-year ban from Davis Cup that resulted from their federation requiring Malek Jaziri to default a match to an Israeli player.

When Tunisia returned to Fed Cup in 2016, they were again placed in Zone Group III. They did not manage to win their round robin groups in 2016 or 2017, losing ties to Greece and Luxembourg in 2016 and then Finland and Malta in 2017. Tunisia again won their round robin group again in 2018, after which they defeated Lithuania to win promotion to Zone Group II in 2019. They did not win their round robin group in 2019, keeping them in Zone Group II for 2020. Jabeur won all of her singles rubbers when the team was promoted in 2012, 2013, and 2018.

=== Olympics ===
As a junior, Jabeur also represented Tunisia at the 2010 Youth Olympics in Singapore, winning two singles matches and one doubles match, the latter with Romanian Cristina Dinu. She was eliminated in the quarterfinals by Chinese player Zheng Saisai in both competitions. Jabeur also represented Tunisia in singles at the London Olympics in 2012, the Rio de Janeiro Olympic Games in 2016, and the Tokyo Olympic Games in 2021. She lost her 2012 opening round match to Sabine Lisicki in three sets. She also lost her 2016 opening round match in three sets, this time to Daria Kasatkina. She had a chance to serve for the match in the second set against Kasatkina, but was broken. In Tokyo, she faced Carla Suárez Navarro in the first round of the singles tournament, but lost in straight sets.

== Playing style ==
Jabeur builds her style of play around variety and hitting what she refers to as "crazy shots". She tries to employ difficult shots because that is how she enjoys playing tennis. She likes to utilize slice and drop shots in particular. Jabeur can hit winners in a variety of ways, including backhand drop shots from the baseline or forehands up the line. She likes to play on any surface.

== Coaches ==
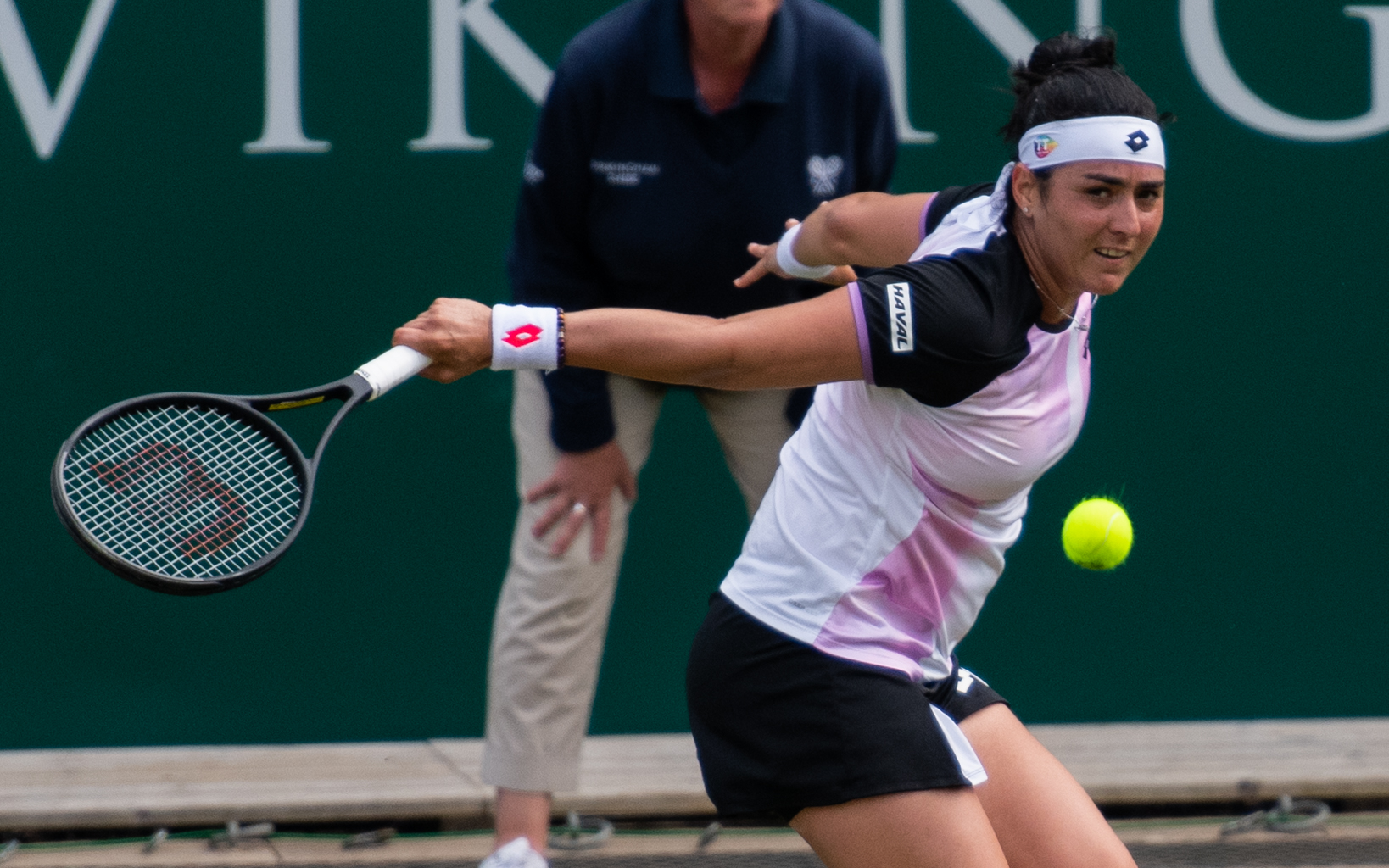
Jabeur's backhand slice

As a junior, Jabeur was coached by Nabil Mlika until she was thirteen years old. Jabeur began working with Bertrand Perret in February 2018.

She viewed Perret as being more supportive of her style of play than her past coaches, saying, "I think he understands my game. He tries to improve my good shots, not change what I do. I've worked with a lot of coaches who tried to change my game ... Bertrand encourages me to do dropshots and also corrects my dropshots, instead of other coaches who told me not to do dropshots at all." In early 2020, Jabeur switched coaches to Issam Jellali, a former Tunisian Davis Cup player with whom she had already been working for about three years.

== Personal life ==
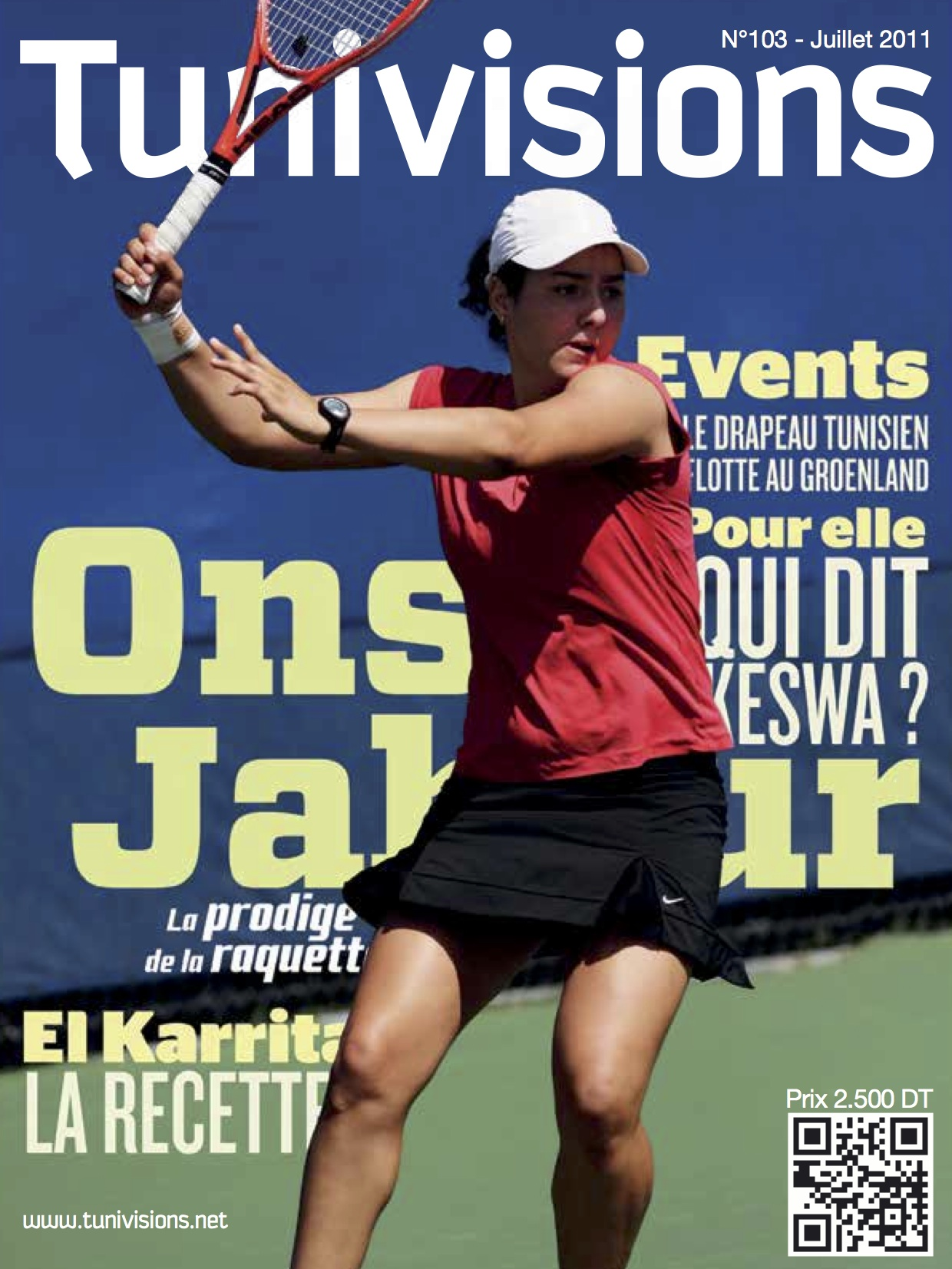
Jabeur photo on the cover of Tunivisions magazine, Issue 103, July 2011, praising her victory in the 2011 French Open for girls

Jabeur is a Muslim. She occasionally has to postpone certain practices expected for Ramadan during tournaments. She is married to Karim Kamoun, a Russian-Tunisian former fencer who has been her fitness coach since mid-2017. In November 2025, Jabeur announced that she was pregnant with her first child with Kamoun, due April 2026. On April 20, Jabeur gave birth to a son, Elyan.

Jabeur was one of 12 players who received an International Player Grand Slam Grant from the Grand Slam Development Fund in 2017 immediately before the French Open, where she won her first two career Grand Slam main-draw matches.

Jabeur won the 2019 Arab Woman of the Year Award in the sport category, having reached the third round of the US Open and established herself as a permanent fixture in the top 100 that year. Jabeur is close friends with fellow tennis player Tatjana Maria, whom she defeated in the semifinals of the 2022 Wimbledon Championships, describing her as her "barbecue buddy".

Due to her on court demeanor and friendly reputation amongst other tennis players, Jabeur has been honorifically nicknamed the "Minister of Happiness" in Tunisia and the wider tennis community.

=== Television and film ===
Jabeur appears in the tennis docuseries Break Point, which premiered on Netflix on 13 January 2023.

== Sponsorship ==
In June 2015, Jabeur signed a partnership contract with Qatar National Bank Tunisia. In 2018, she became an ambassador of HAVAL belonging to the automotive manufacturer Great Wall Motor through Atlas Auto, its distributor in Tunisia, then was sponsored in the same year by the Joossoor group, chaired by businessman Moez Driss. She began being endorsed by Qatar Airways in 2020. In December 2020, she began being sponsored by the Tunisian telecommunications operator Tunisie Télécom.

In 2023, she signed with Evolve, a sports management agency founded by four-time Grand Slam champion Naomi Osaka. In 2024, she switched her clothing sponsor from Lotto Sport to the Saudi brand Kayanee, which launched last year as a part of Saudi Arabia's Vision 2030 initiative.

== Sports ownership ==
On 25 August 2023, Jabeur purchased a minority stake in National Women's Soccer League club North Carolina Courage, becoming the second professional tennis player to do so after Naomi Osaka.

== Career statistics ==
=== Grand Slam singles performance timeline ===
Key
W	F	SF	QF	#R	RR	Q#	DNQ	A	NH

(W) winner; (F) finalist; (SF) semifinalist; (QF) quarterfinalist; (#R) rounds 4, 3, 2, 1; (RR) round-robin stage; (Q#) qualification round; (DNQ) did not qualify; (A) absent; (NH) not held; (SR) strike rate (events won / competed); (W–L) win–loss record.
To avoid confusion and double counting, these charts are updated at the conclusion of a tournament or when the player's participation has ended.

Tournament	2012	2013	2014	2015	2016	2017	2018	2019	2020	2021	2022	2023	2024	2025	SR	W–L	Win %
Australian Open	A	A	A	1R	A	Q3	1R	1R	QF	3R	A	2R	2R	3R	0 / 8	10–8	56%
French Open	Q2	A	Q1	Q2	A	3R	Q2	1R	4R	4R	1R	QF	QF	1R	0 / 8	16–8	67%
Wimbledon	A	Q1	Q3	A	Q1	1R	2R	1R	NH	QF	F	F	3R	1R	0 / 8	19–8	70%
US Open	A	Q1	1R	Q1	Q1	2R	1R	3R	3R	3R	F	4R	A	A	0 / 8	16–8	67%
Win–Loss	0–0	0–0	0–1	0–1	0–0	3–3	1–3	2–4	9–3	11–4	12–3	14–4	7–3	2–3	0 / 32	61–32	66%

=== Grand Slam tournament finals ===
==== Singles: 3 (3 runner-ups) ====
Result	Year	Tournament	Surface	Opponent	Score
Loss	2022	Wimbledon	Grass	(Kazakhstan) Elena Rybakina	6–3, 2–6, 2–6
Loss	2022	US Open	Hard	(Poland) Iga Świątek	2–6, 6–7^{(5–7)}
Loss	2023	Wimbledon	Grass	(Czech Republic) Markéta Vondroušová	4–6, 4–6

== Honours and awards ==
2022

- Grand officer of the National Order of Merit of Tunisia (July 2022)
- Named one of the 2022 BBC 100 Women as role model for young tennis players
- WTA Awards - Karen Krantzcke Sportsmanship Award

2023

- WTA Awards - Karen Krantzcke Sportsmanship Award
- WTA Awards - Peachy Kellmeyer Player Service

2024

- WTA Awards - Karen Krantzcke Sportsmanship Award
- WTA Awards - Peachy Kellmeyer Player Service
