= Essi Laine =

Finnish tennis player

- Country (sports): Finland
- Born: 27 July 1984 (age 40); Lahti, Finland
- Turned pro: 2002
- Retired: 2008
- Plays: Right-handed (double-handed backhand)
- Prize money: $5,498

Singles
- Career record: 6 - 22
- Highest ranking: 939 (8 September 2003)

Doubles
- Career record: 26 - 31
- Career titles: 2 ITF
- Highest ranking: 444 (11 April 2005)

Team competitions
- Fed Cup: 9–15

Essi Laine (born 27 July 1984) is a retired Finnish tennis player.

Laine won two doubles titles on the International Tennis Federation (ITF) tour in her career, both in 2004. On 11 April 2005, she peaked at world number 444 in the doubles rankings. Her doubles partner was, Emma Laine, her younger sister. On 8 September 2003, she reached her best singles ranking of world number 939.

Representing Finland at the Fed Cup, Laine has a win–loss record of 9–15.

Essi Laine retired from tennis 2008.

== Personal life ==
Laine was born in Lahti, Finland. Her mother, Erika, was a Finnish Championship swimmer and her late father, Erkki Laine, was a professional ice hockey player who won a silver medal 1988 Calgary Olympics with the Finnish national team. Her younger sister, Emma, played tennis professionally until 2019.

== ITF Doubles Circuit finals: 3 (2–1) ==
$100,000 tournaments
$75,000 tournaments
$50,000 tournaments
$25,000 tournaments
$10,000 tournaments

Outcome	No.	Date	Tournament	Surface	Partner	Opponents in the final	Score in the final
Winner	1.	16 February 2004	Capriolo, Italy	Carpet (i)	(Finland) Emma Laine	(Netherlands) Jolanda Mens (Germany) Stefanie Weis	6–3, 6–3
Winner	2.	13 September 2004	Manchester, United Kingdom	Hard (i)	(Finland) Emma Laine	(United Kingdom) Hannah Collin (United Kingdom) Anna Hawkins	6–4, 6–4
Runner-up	3.	15 August 2005	Helsinki, Finland	Hard	(Finland) Emma Laine	(Bulgaria) Maria Geznenge (Austria) Stefanie Haidner	5–7, 6–2, 4–6
