= Lynsey McCullough =

Irish tennis player

- Born: March 1, 1991 (age 34) Antrim, Northern Ireland
- Height: 1.75 m (5 ft 9 in)
- Turned pro: 2008
- Plays: Right-handed (two-handed backhand)
- Prize money: USA$6,102

Singles
- Career record: 29 – 19
- Career titles: 0 WTA, 0 ITF
- Highest ranking: No. NA (October 10, 2011)
- Current ranking: No. NA (October 10, 2011)

Doubles
- Career record: 9 – 3
- Career titles: 0 WTA, 0 ITF
- Highest ranking: No. NA (October 10, 2011)
- Last updated on: October 10, 2011.

Lynsey McCullough (born March 1, 1991) is a Northern Irish former professional tennis player who represented Ireland. She played for the Ireland Fed Cup team from 2009 to 2012, achieving a win–loss record of 7–6. She now coaches junior tennis players in Northern Ireland

== Career ==
- Irish Indoors U18 Winner – January 2009
- U18 Scottish National Champion – February 2009
- Ulster Junior Open U18 Winner – July 2009
- County Antrim U18 Junior Champion – August 2009
- South of Ireland Omni Court Senior Champion – April 2009
- South of Ireland Senior Champion – June 2009
- Ulster Senior Ladies Champion – June 2009
- Larne Senior Open Champion – June 2009
- County Dublin Senior Open Champion – July 2009
- Ballycastle Ladies Champion – July 2009
- South of Ireland Omni Court Championships Doubles Winner – April 2009
- Ulster Senior Doubles Champion – June 2009
- County Dublin Championships Doubles Winner – July 2009
- Ballycastle Doubles Champion – July 2009
- Ulster Senior Championships Mixed Doubles Winner – April 2009
- County Dublin Championships Mixed Doubles Winner – July 2009
- County Wicklow Senior Mixed Doubles Winner – August 2009
- Larne Senior Championships Mixed Doubles Winner – June 2009
- Ballycastle Senior Mixed Doubles Winner – July 2009
- Lynsey was awarded the "Larne Junior Sports Performer of the Year" in 2009. She was also the winner of the O'Shee award, presented by Tennis Ireland, which is awarded to the most outstanding junior girl of the year.
- McCullough has had the honour to represent her country and province at such a young age;
- The Federation Cup (Ireland) in Malta – April 2009
- Senior Interprovincials (Ulster) – August 2009
- Junior Interprovincials (Ulster) – August 2009
- 4 Nations (Ireland) in Glasgow – September 2009
