= Nadia Lalami =

Moroccan tennis player

- Full name: Nadia Lalami Laaroussi
- Country (sports): Morocco
- Born: 28 April 1990 (age 36) Casablanca, Morocco
- Turned pro: 2008
- Prize money: $51,876

Singles
- Career record: 83–82
- Career titles: 2 ITF
- Highest ranking: No. 322 (19 September 2011)

Grand Slam singles results
- Australian Open Junior: 1R (2008)
- French Open Junior: 1R (2008)
- Wimbledon Junior: 1R (2008)
- US Open Junior: 1R (2007)

Doubles
- Career record: 45–68
- Career titles: 2 ITF
- Highest ranking: No. 427 (29 August 2011)

Grand Slam doubles results
- Australian Open Junior: 1R (2008)
- French Open Junior: 1R (2008)
- Wimbledon Junior: 2R (2008)
- US Open Junior: 1R (2007)

Team competitions
- Fed Cup: 18–12
Medal record
Representing Morocco
Mediterranean Games
Bronze medal – third place	2009 Pescara	women's doubles
Pan Arab Games
Silver medal – second place	2011 Doha	women's doubles
Bronze medal – third place	2011 Doha	women's singles
Bronze medal – third place	2011 Doha	women's team

Nadia Lalami Laaroussi (born 28 April 1990) is a Moroccan former professional tennis player.

In her career, she won two singles titles and two doubles titles on the ITF Women's Circuit. On 19 September 2011, she reached her best singles ranking of world No. 322. On 29 August 2011, she peaked at No. 427 in the doubles rankings.

Playing for Morocco Fed Cup team, Lalami has a win–loss record of 18–12.

== Career ==
At the 2011 Grand Prix SAR La Princesse Lalla Meryem in Fes, she upset the top seed and world No. 24, Aravane Rezaï, in the second round, becoming the first Moroccan player to reach the quarterfinals of a WTA tournament.

== ITF finals ==
=== Singles (2–2) ===
Legend $25,000 tournaments $10,000 tournaments	Finals by surface Hard (0–0) Clay (2–2)

Result	No.	Date	Tournament	Surface	Opponent	Score
Win	1.	25 October 2008	Vila Real de Santo António, Portugal	Clay	(Morocco) Lamia Essaadi	2–1 ret.
Loss	1.	1 August 2009	Rabat, Morocco	Clay	(France) Iryna Brémond	6–4, 3–6, 1–6
Win	2.	22 May 2010	Rivoli, Italy	Clay	(Italy) Verdiana Verardi	6–4, 6–2
Loss	2.	19 September 2010	Lleida, Spain	Clay	(France) Elixane Lechemia	6–7^{(3)}, 1–6

=== Doubles (2–4) ===
Legend $100,000 tournaments $50,000 tournaments $25,000 tournaments $10,000 tournaments	Finals by surface Hard (1–0) Clay (1–4) Grass (0–0) Carpet (0–0)

Result	No.	Date	Tournament	Surface	Partner	Opponents	Score
Win	1.	26 October 2008	Vila Real de Santo António, Portugal	Clay	(Morocco) Fatima El Allami	(Italy) Raffaella Bindi (Netherlands) Claire Lablans	6–4, 6–3
Loss	1.	6 February 2010	Mallorca, Spain	Clay	(Morocco) Fatima El Allami	(Russia) Viktoria Kamenskaya (Russia) Daria Kuchmina	5–7, 4–6
Win	2.	5 September 2010	Mollerussa, Spain	Hard	(Ukraine) Yevgeniya Kryvoruchko	(Russia) Aminat Kushkhova (Russia) Olga Panova	6–3, 5–7, [10–8]
Loss	2.	26 September 2010	Algiers, Algeria	Clay	(Ukraine) Khristina Kazimova	(Belgium) Sophie Cornerotte (Netherlands) Marcella Koek	6–7^{(3)}, 2–6
Loss	3.	3 October 2010	Algiers, Algeria	Clay	(Ukraine) Khristina Kazimova	(Morocco) Fatima El Allami (Netherlands) Marcella Koek	0–6, 1–6
Loss	4.	29 November 2013	Fes, Morocco	Clay	(Ecuador) Charlotte Römer	(Australia) Alexandra Nancarrow (Spain) Olga Parres Azcoitia	6–7^{(2)}, 3–6
