= Liudmila Nikoyan =

Liudmila Nikoyan Լյուդմիլա Նիկոյանը
- Country (sports): Russia (1997–2001); Armenia (2001–2010)
- Born: 1 August 1979 (age 46) Russian SFSR, USSR (now Russia)
- Turned pro: 1997
- Retired: 2010
- Plays: Right (two-handed backhand)
- Prize money: $27,157

Singles
- Career record: 55–101
- Career titles: 0
- Highest ranking: No. 500 (9 October 2000)

Doubles
- Career record: 105–121
- Career titles: 5 ITF
- Highest ranking: No. 347 (15 May 2000)

Team competitions
- Fed Cup: 21–7

Liudmila Nikoyan (Armenian: Լյուդմիլա Նիկոյանը; born 1 August 1979) is a Russian born former Armenian tennis player.

In her career, Nikoyan won five doubles titles on the ITF Circuit. On 9 October 2000, she reached her best singles ranking of world No. 500. On 15 May 2000, she peaked at No. 347 in the doubles rankings.

Playing for Armenia Fed Cup team, Nikoyan has a win–loss record of 21–7.

In 2010, Nikoyan retired from the professional tour. She became a beach tennis player.

== ITF finals ==
=== Doubles (5–11) ===
Legend $100,000 tournaments $75,000 tournaments $50,000 tournaments $25,000 tournaments $10,000 tournaments	Finals by surface Hard (2–6) Clay (3–4) Grass (0–0) Carpet (0–1)

Outcome	No.	Date	Tournament	Surface	Partner	Opponents	Score
Runner-up	1.	23 May 1999	Horb, Germany	Hard	(Estonia) Liina Suurvarik	(Germany) Esther Brunn (Germany) Camilla Kremer	1–6, 6–7^{(2)}
Winner	1.	12 July 1999	Brussels, Belgium	Clay	(Latvia) Līga Dekmeijere	(France) Ségolène Berger (France) Victoria Courmes	6–7^{(6)}, 6–3, 6–3
Runner-up	2.	9 August 1999	Istanbul, Turkey	Hard	(Russia) Ekaterina Sysoeva	(Belarus) Nadejda Ostrovskaya (Russia) Ekaterina Paniouchkina	0–6, 2–6
Winner	2.	24 April 2000	Cerignola, Italy	Clay	(Russia) Maria Boboedova	(Italy) Maria Elena Camerin (Italy) Mara Santangelo	w/o
Runner-up	3.	30 October 2000	Minsk, Belarus	Carpet (i)	(Russia) Raissa Gourevitch	(Czech Republic) Eva Birnerová (Russia) Alexandra Zerkalova	4–2, 5–3, 3–5, 2–4, 0–4
Runner-up	4.	3 June 2001	Warsaw, Poland	Clay	(Ukraine) Yuliya Beygelzimer	(Slovakia) Martina Babáková (Czech Republic) Lenka Snajdrova	4–6, 4–6
Winner	3.	23 July 2002	Horb, Germany	Clay	(Russia) Svetlana Mossiakova	(Romania) Ruxandra Marin (Romania) Delia Sescioreanu	7–6^{(4)}, 6–1
Runner-up	5.	30 March 2004	Cairo, Egypt	Clay	(Ukraine) Olena Antypina	(Russia) Raissa Gourevitch (Russia) Ekaterina Kozhokina	2–6, 0–6
Runner-up	6.	20 June 2005	Alkmaar, Netherlands	Clay	(Russia) Kristina Movsesyan	(Netherlands) Kelly de Beer (Belgium) Jessie de Vries	6–3, 3–6, 4–6
Runner-up	7.	20 June 2006	Alcobaça, Portugal	Hard	(Russia) Natalia Pervitskaya	(United Kingdom) Melissa Berry (Russia) Natalia Orlova	7–6^{(5)}, 6–7^{(3)}, 1–6
Winner	4.	26 June 2006	Amarante, Portugal	Hard	(Australia) Lucia Gonzalez	(Russia) Natalia Pervitskaya (Australia) Jenny Swift	6–1, 6–2
Runner-up	8.	17 September 2006	Tbilisi, Georgia	Hard	(Russia) Varvara Galanina	(Russia) Yulia Solonitskaya (Kazakhstan) Amina Rakhim	5–7, 1–6
Runner-up	9.	22 September 2006	Tbilisi, Georgia	Hard	(Russia) Varvara Galanina	(Germany) Ria Dörnemann (Kyrgyzstan) Ksenia Palkina	4–6, 6–3, 0–6
Runner-up	10.	14 October 2007	Espinho, Portugal	Clay	(Russia) Inna Sokolova	(Slovakia) Romana Tabak (Poland) Sylwia Zagórska	6–3, 1–6, [4–10]
Runner-up	11.	24 February 2008	Portimão, Portugal	Hard	(Russia) Elena Chalova	(France) Émilie Bacquet (Netherlands) Chayenne Ewijk	w/o
Winner	5.	21 February 2009	Portimão, Portugal	Hard	(Russia) Diana Isaeva	(Brazil) Raquel Piltcher (Brazil) Roxane Vaisemberg	7–6^{(5)}, 6–3
