= 2015 Baku Cup – Singles =

Singles
- 2015 Baku Cup

Final
- Champion: (Russia) Margarita Gasparyan
- Runner-up: (Romania) Patricia Maria Țig
- Score: 6–3, 5–7, 6–0

Details
- Draw: 32
- Seeds: 8

Events
Singles	Doubles
- Baku Cup

Elina Svitolina was the two-time defending champion, but chose not to participate this year.

Unseeded Margarita Gasparyan won her first WTA title, defeating Patricia Maria Țig in the final, 6–3, 5–7, 6–0.

== Seeds ==
1. (Russia) Anastasia Pavlyuchenkova (semifinals)
2. (Italy) Karin Knapp (semifinals)
3. (Slovakia) Dominika Cibulková (first round)
4. (Japan) Kurumi Nara (first round)
5. (Serbia) Bojana Jovanovski (first round)
6. (Ukraine) Lesia Tsurenko (withdrew)
7. (Russia) Vitalia Diatchenko (second round)
8. (Italy) Francesca Schiavone (first round)
9. (Montenegro) Danka Kovinić (first round, retired)

== Draw ==
Key

- Q = Qualifier
- WC = Wild card
- LL = Lucky loser
- Alt = Alternate
- ITF = ITF entry
- PR = Protected ranking
- SR = Special ranking
- SE = Special exempt
- JE = Junior exempt
- JR = Junior Accelerator Programme entrant
- CO = College Accelerator Programme entrant
- NG = Next Gen Accelerator Program entrant
- w/o = Walkover
- r = Retired
- d = Defaulted

=== Finals ===
Semifinals
1	(Russia) Anastasia Pavlyuchenkova	3	2
Q	(Romania) Patricia Maria Țig	6	6
(Russia) Margarita Gasparyan	6	5	6
2	(Italy) Karin Knapp	3	7	3

Final
Q	(Romania) Patricia Maria Țig	3	7	0
(Russia) Margarita Gasparyan	6	5	6

=== Top half ===
First round
1	(Russia) A Pavlyuchenkova	3	6	7^{7}
(Russia) E Kulichkova	6	2	6^{4}
(Ukraine) K Bondarenko	6	6
Q	(Russia) V Ivakhnenko	1	2
(Turkey) Ç Büyükakçay	1	7^{7}	4
(Belgium) K Flipkens	6	6^{3}	6
Q	(Uzbekistan) N Abduraimova	3	4
7	(Russia) V Diatchenko	6	6
4	(Japan) K Nara	3	2
Q	(Ukraine) O Savchuk	6	6
Q	(Ukraine) O Ianchuk	4	2
Q	(Romania) PM Țig	6	6
(Czech Republic) Kr Plíšková	6	5	3
(China) L Zhu	3	7	6
(Croatia) D Vekić	6	6
8	(Italy) F Schiavone	4	2

Second round
1	(Russia) A Pavlyuchenkova	3
(Ukraine) K Bondarenko	0^{r}
(Belgium) K Flipkens	6	7^{7}
7	(Russia) V Diatchenko	4	6^{5}
Q	(Ukraine) O Savchuk	5	4
Q	(Romania) PM Țig	7	6
(China) L Zhu	4	6	3
(Croatia) D Vekić	6	0	6

Quarterfinals
1	(Russia) A Pavlyuchenkova	6	6
(Belgium) K Flipkens	1	3
Q	(Romania) PM Țig	6	6
(Croatia) D Vekić	3	2

Semifinals
1	(Russia) A Pavlyuchenkova	3	2
Q	(Romania) PM Țig	6	6

=== Bottom half ===
First round
9	(Montenegro) D Kovinić	0	0^{r}
(Russia) E Rodina	6	2
WC	(Ukraine) O Korashvili	6	6
WC	(Azerbaijan) Z Safarova	0	0
LL	(Ukraine) Y Beygelzimer	3	0^{r}
Q	(China) Z Yang	6	0
(Russia) M Gasparyan	6	7
3	(Slovakia) D Cibulková	3	5
5	(Serbia) B Jovanovski	6^{6}	5
(Czech Republic) A Hlaváčková	7	7
WC	(Poland) M Linette	4	1
(Russia) A Panova	6	6
(Estonia) A Kontaveit	7	6
(Japan) M Eguchi	5	2
(Switzerland) S Vögele	1	4
2	(Italy) K Knapp	6	6

Second round
(Russia) E Rodina	6	6
WC	(Ukraine) O Korashvili	1	1
Q	(China) Z Yang	4	4
(Russia) M Gasparyan	6	6
(Czech Republic) A Hlaváčková	6^{4}	2
(Russia) A Panova	7^{7}	6
(Estonia) A Kontaveit	1	0
2	(Italy) K Knapp	6	6

Quarterfinals
(Russia) E Rodina	3	2
(Russia) M Gasparyan	6	6
(Russia) A Panova	2	6^{4}
2	(Italy) K Knapp	6	7^{7}

Semifinals
(Russia) M Gasparyan	6	5	6
2	(Italy) K Knapp	3	7	3

== Qualifying ==
=== Seeds ===
1. (Romania) Patricia Maria Țig (qualified)
2. (China) Yang Zhaoxuan (qualified)
3. (Ukraine) Yuliya Beygelzimer (qualifying competition, lucky loser)
4. (Japan) Hiroko Kuwata (qualifying competition)
5. (Turkey) İpek Soylu (qualifying competition)
6. (Uzbekistan) Nigina Abduraimova (qualified)
7. (Austria) Patricia Mayr-Achleitner (first round)
8. (Czech Republic) Kateřina Vaňková (qualifying competition)
9. (Ukraine) Olga Ianchuk (qualified)
10. (Russia) Valentyna Ivakhnenko (qualified)
11. (Ukraine) Olga Savchuk (qualified)
12. (Ukraine) Elizaveta Ianchuk (first round)

=== Qualifiers ===
1. (Romania) Patricia Maria Țig
2. (China) Yang Zhaoxuan
3. (Ukraine) Olga Savchuk
4. (Russia) Valentyna Ivakhnenko
5. (Ukraine) Olga Ianchuk
6. (Uzbekistan) Nigina Abduraimova

=== Lucky loser ===
1. (Ukraine) Yuliya Beygelzimer

=== Draw ===
==== First qualifier ====
First round					Qualifying competition
					1	(Romania) Patricia Maria Țig	6	6
	(Georgia (country)) Oksana Kalashnikova	2	6	6		(Georgia (country)) Oksana Kalashnikova	1	3
7	(Austria) Patricia Mayr-Achleitner	6	3	2

==== Second qualifier ====
First round				Qualifying competition
				2	(China) Yang Zhaoxuan	6	6
	(Ukraine) Olga Fridman	4	0	8	(Czech Republic) Kateřina Vaňková	3	3
8	(Czech Republic) Kateřina Vaňková	6	6

==== Third qualifier ====
First round				Qualifying competition
				3	(Ukraine) Yuliya Beygelzimer	4	0
	(Russia) Anna Morgina	0	0	11	(Ukraine) Olga Savchuk	6	6
11	(Ukraine) Olga Savchuk	6	6

==== Fourth qualifier ====
First round				Qualifying competition
				4	(Japan) Hiroko Kuwata	4	1
	(Russia) Polina Monova	3	3	10	(Russia) Valentyna Ivakhnenko	6	6
10	(Russia) Valentyna Ivakhnenko	6	6

==== Fifth qualifier ====
First round
5	(Turkey) İpek Soylu	6	6
WC	(Czech Republic) Eva Hrdinová	1	1
WC	(Azerbaijan) Amina Dik	2	0
9	(Ukraine) Olga Ianchuk	6	6

Qualifying competition
5	(Turkey) İpek Soylu	4	4
9	(Ukraine) Olga Ianchuk	6	6

==== Sixth qualifier ====
First round
6	(Uzbekistan) Nigina Abduraimova	6	6
(Russia) Ksenia Lykina	3	4
(Italy) Nastassja Burnett	7	5	6
12	(Ukraine) Elizaveta Ianchuk	5	7	3

Qualifying competition
6	(Uzbekistan) Nigina Abduraimova	7	6
(Italy) Nastassja Burnett	5	3
