= 2015 Baku Cup – Doubles =

Doubles
- 2015 Baku Cup

Final
- Champions: (Russia) Margarita Gasparyan (Russia) Alexandra Panova
- Runners-up: (Russia) Vitalia Diatchenko (Ukraine) Olga Savchuk
- Score: 6–3, 7–5

Details
- Draw: 14
- Seeds: 4

Events
Singles	Doubles
- Baku Cup

Alexandra Panova and Heather Watson were the defending champions, but Watson chose not to participate. Panova successfully defended the title alongside Margarita Gasparyan, defeating Vitalia Diatchenko and Olga Savchuk in the final, 6–3, 7–5.

== Seeds ==
1. (Russia) Margarita Gasparyan / (Russia) Alexandra Panova (champions)
2. (Russia) Vitalia Diatchenko / (Ukraine) Olga Savchuk (final)
3. (Japan) Hiroko Kuwata / (Netherlands) Demi Schuurs (first round)
4. (Georgia (country)) Oksana Kalashnikova / (Montenegro) Danka Kovinić (quarterfinals)

== Draw ==
Key

- Q = Qualifier
- WC = Wild card
- LL = Lucky loser
- Alt = Alternate
- ITF = ITF entry
- PR = Protected ranking
- SR = Special ranking
- SE = Special exempt
- JE = Junior exempt
- JR = Junior Accelerator Programme entrant
- CO = College Accelerator Programme entrant
- NG = Next Gen Accelerator Program entrant
- w/o = Walkover
- r = Retired
- d = Defaulted

First round
(Japan) M Eguchi (Romania) PM Țig	6	6
(Ukraine) Y Beygelzimer (Turkey) Ç Büyükakçay	2	4
4	(Georgia (country)) O Kalashnikova (Montenegro) D Kovinić	6	6
(Russia) V Ivakhnenko (Russia) A Morgina	4	1
(China) Z Yang (China) L Zhu	6	6
(Ukraine) O Ianchuk (Ukraine) O Korashvili	4	3
(Russia) K Lykina (Russia) P Monova	6	6
WC	(Azerbaijan) A Dik (Azerbaijan) Z Safarova	0	0
(Ukraine) A Fomina (Czech Republic) K Vaňková	6	7^{7}
3	(Japan) H Kuwata (Netherlands) D Schuurs	1	6^{3}
(Ukraine) O Fridman (Ukraine) E Ianchuk	1	3
(Czech Republic) E Hrdinová (Russia) E Rodina	6	6

Quarterfinals
1	(Russia) M Gasparyan (Russia) A Panova	7^{7}	6
(Japan) M Eguchi (Romania) PM Țig	6^{0}	3
4	(Georgia (country)) O Kalashnikova (Montenegro) D Kovinić	4	1
(China) Z Yang (China) L Zhu	6	6
(Russia) K Lykina (Russia) P Monova	6	6
(Ukraine) A Fomina (Czech Republic) K Vaňková	4	1
(Czech Republic) E Hrdinová (Russia) E Rodina	3	1
2	(Russia) V Diatchenko (Ukraine) O Savchuk	6	6

Semifinals
1	(Russia) M Gasparyan (Russia) A Panova	4	6	[10]
(China) Z Yang (China) L Zhu	6	2	[7]
(Russia) K Lykina (Russia) P Monova	5	5
2	(Russia) V Diatchenko (Ukraine) O Savchuk	7	7

Final
1	(Russia) M Gasparyan (Russia) A Panova	6	7
2	(Russia) V Diatchenko (Ukraine) O Savchuk	3	5
