= 2012 Baku Cup – Singles =

Singles
- 2012 Baku Cup

Final
- Champion: (Serbia) Bojana Jovanovski
- Runner-up: (United States) Julia Cohen
- Score: 6–3, 6–1

Details
- Draw: 32
- Seeds: 8

Events
Singles	Doubles
- Baku Cup

Vera Zvonareva was the defending champion but was chosen to compete the 2012 Summer Olympics in London instead.
Fifth-seeded Bojana Jovanovski defeated Julia Cohen 6–3, 6–1 in the final to win the tournament.

== Seeds ==
1. (Kazakhstan) Ksenia Pervak (first round, retired)
2. (Russia) Alexandra Panova (semifinals)
3. (Luxembourg) Mandy Minella (quarterfinals)
4. (Czech Republic) Andrea Hlaváčková (first round)
5. (Serbia) Bojana Jovanovski (champion)
6. (Russia) Nina Bratchikova (quarterfinals)
7. (Uzbekistan) Akgul Amanmuradova (first round)
8. (Czech Republic) Eva Birnerová (first round)

== Draw ==
Key

- Q = Qualifier
- WC = Wild card
- LL = Lucky loser
- Alt = Alternate
- ITF = ITF entry
- PR = Protected ranking
- SR = Special ranking
- SE = Special exempt
- JE = Junior exempt
- JR = Junior Accelerator Programme entrant
- CO = College Accelerator Programme entrant
- NG = Next Gen Accelerator Program entrant
- w/o = Walkover
- r = Retired
- d = Defaulted

=== Finals ===
Semifinals
(United States) Julia Cohen	3	6	6
(Russia) Olga Puchkova	6	0	3
5	(Serbia) Bojana Jovanovski	6	6
2	(Russia) Alexandra Panova	2	2

Final
(United States) Julia Cohen	3	1
5	(Serbia) Bojana Jovanovski	6	6

=== Top half ===
First round
1	(Kazakhstan) K Pervak	4	6	2^{r}
(United States) J Cohen	6	3	3
WC	(Azerbaijan) K Farhad	1	0
(Russia) A Kudryavtseva	6	6
WC	(Russia) V Flink	6	3	2
(Thailand) T Tanasugarn	3	6	6
(Slovakia) M Rybáriková	6	6
8	(Czech Republic) E Birnerová	1	1
3	(Luxembourg) M Minella	6	5	6
Q	(China) Q Wang	2	7	3
(France) C Garcia	6	5	0
(Poland) M Domachowska	1	7	6
(Kazakhstan) Z Diyas	3	1
(Italy) A Brianti	6	6
(Russia) O Puchkova	6	7^{14}
7	(Uzbekistan) A Amanmuradova	3	6^{12}

Second round
(United States) J Cohen	6	6
(Russia) A Kudryavtseva	1	4
(Thailand) T Tanasugarn	1	0
(Slovakia) M Rybáriková	6	6
3	(Luxembourg) M Minella	6	7
(Poland) M Domachowska	4	5
(Italy) A Brianti	6	6^{2}	1
(Russia) O Puchkova	3	7^{7}	6

Quarterfinals
(United States) J Cohen	3	6	6
(Slovakia) M Rybáriková	6	3	4
3	(Luxembourg) M Minella	6	1	2
(Russia) O Puchkova	2	6	6

Semifinals
(United States) J Cohen	3	6	6
(Russia) O Puchkova	6	0	3

=== Bottom half ===
First round
5	(Serbia) B Jovanovski	6	2	6
(Ukraine) L Tsurenko	3	6	3
Q	(Russia) V Solovieva	1	6	7^{7}
(Ukraine) O Savchuk	6	3	6^{1}
(Thailand) N Lertcheewakarn	1	0^{r}
(Spain) L Pous Tió	6	2
Q	(Serbia) A Krunić	6	6^{11}	6
4	(Czech Republic) A Hlaváčková	1	7^{13}	4
6	(Russia) N Bratchikova	6	6
(Austria) P Mayr-Achleitner	2	4
(Spain) E Cabeza Candela	6	6
WC	(Georgia (country)) E Gorgodze	1	1
(Poland) S Zaniewska	6	7^{7}
(Ukraine) E Svitolina	1	6^{4}
Q	(Australia) S Jones	5	6^{7}
2	(Russia) A Panova	7	7^{9}

Second round
5	(Serbia) B Jovanovski	6	6
Q	(Russia) V Solovieva	2	3
(Spain) L Pous Tió	6^{5}	3
Q	(Serbia) A Krunić	7^{7}	6
6	(Russia) N Bratchikova	6
(Spain) E Cabeza Candela	0	r
(Poland) S Zaniewska	6	6^{8}	3
2	(Russia) A Panova	4	7^{10}	6

Quarterfinals
5	(Serbia) B Jovanovski	5	7^{7}	6
Q	(Serbia) A Krunić	7	6^{3}	3
6	(Russia) N Bratchikova	6	6^{5}	4
2	(Russia) A Panova	2	7^{7}	6

Semifinals
5	(Serbia) B Jovanovski	6	6
2	(Russia) A Panova	2	2

== Qualifying ==
=== Seeds ===
1. (Australia) Sacha Jones (qualified)
2. (Serbia) Aleksandra Krunić (qualified)
3. (Russia) Valeria Solovieva (qualified)
4. (Japan) Rika Fujiwara (qualifying competition, retired)
5. (Russia) Daria Gavrilova (qualifying competition)
6. (China) Wang Qiang (qualified)
7. (China) Zhou Yimiao (qualifying competition)
8. (Australia) Stephanie Bengson (first round)

=== Qualifiers ===
1. (Australia) Sacha Jones
2. (Serbia) Aleksandra Krunić
3. (Russia) Valeria Solovieva
4. (China) Wang Qiang

=== Draw ===
==== First qualifier ====
First round				Qualifying competition
				1	(Australia) Sacha Jones	6	6
WC	(Russia) Anna Smolina	1	1	5	(Russia) Daria Gavrilova	3	2
5	(Russia) Daria Gavrilova	6	6

==== Second qualifier ====
First round				Qualifying competition
				2	(Serbia) Aleksandra Krunić	6	6
WC	(Ukraine) Oleksandra Korashvili	2	0	7	(China) Zhou Yimiao	4	2
7	(China) Zhou Yimiao	6	6

==== Third qualifier ====
First round				Qualifying competition
				3	(Russia) Valeria Solovieva	6	6
	(Belarus) Ekaterina Dzehalevich	6	6		(Belarus) Ekaterina Dzehalevich	3	0
8	(Australia) Stephanie Bengson	0	3

==== Fourth qualifier ====
First round				Qualifying competition
				4	(Japan) Rika Fujiwara	1	6	1^{r}
WC	(Russia) Nina Khrisanova	4	0	6	(China) Wang Qiang	6	3	4
6	(China) Wang Qiang	6	6
