= Anna Smolina =

Russian tennis player

Anna Smolina Анна Смолина
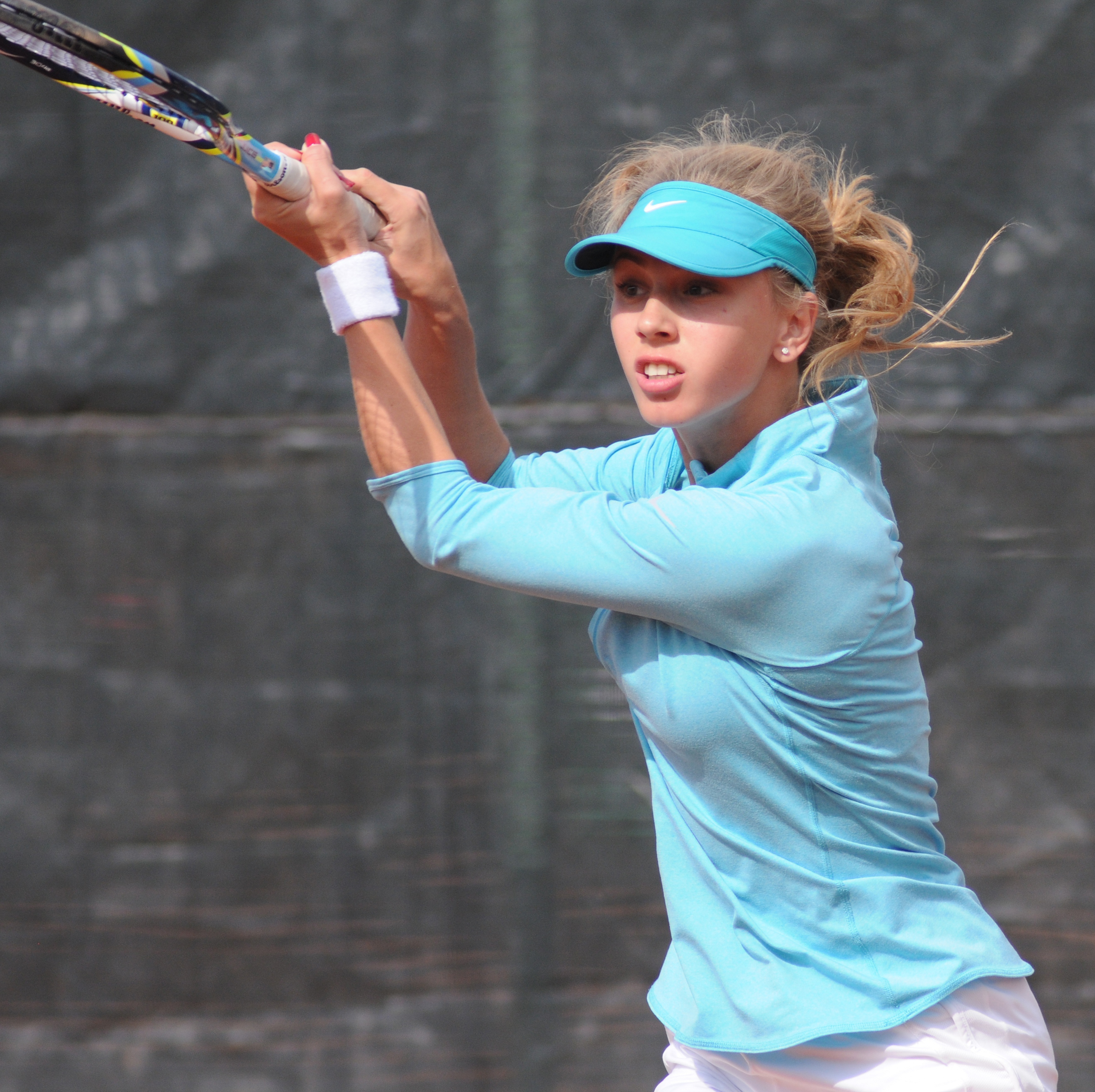
- Smolina at the 2014 Moscow Cup
- Full name: Anna Arkadyevna Smolina
- Country (sports): Russia
- Born: 1 September 1994 (age 30); Kazan, Russia
- Prize money: $16,571

Singles
- Career record: 43–62
- Career titles: 0
- Highest ranking: No. 725 (25 November 2013)

Doubles
- Career record: 48–48
- Career titles: 4 ITF
- Highest ranking: No. 466 (29 October 2012)

Anna Arkadyevna Smolina (Russian: Анна Аркадьевна Смолина; born 1 September 1994) is a Russian former tennis player.

In her career, Smolina won four doubles titles on the ITF Women's Circuit. On 29 October 2012, she reached her best singles ranking of world No. 466.

Smolina made her WTA Tour debut at the 2012 Baku Cup, partnering Caroline Garcia in doubles; they lost in the quarterfinals to top seeds Nina Bratchikova and Alexandra Panova.

== ITF finals ==
=== Doubles (4–4) ===
Legend $25,000 tournaments $10,000 tournaments	Finals by surface Clay (2–4) Carpet (2–0)

Result	No.	Date	Tournament	Surface	Partner	Opponents	Score
Win	1.	31 October 2011	Minsk, Belarus	Carpet (i)	(Russia) Polina Monova	(Ukraine) Olga Ianchuk (Belarus) Lidziya Marozava	6–3, 6–4
Win	2.	23 January 2012	Kaarst, Germany	Carpet (i)	(Russia) Margarita Gasparyan	(Russia) Alexandra Artamonova (Russia) Marina Melnikova	6–7^{(2)}, 6–2, [10–8]
Win	3.	2 July 2012	Brussels, Belgium	Clay	(Chile) Daniela Seguel	(Belgium) Elyne Boeykens (Australia) Karolina Wlodarczak	2–6, 6–2, [10–7]
Win	4.	20 August 2012	Braunschweig, Germany	Clay	(Bosnia and Herzegovina) Jasmina Kajtazovič	(Germany) Kim Grajdek (Poland) Sylwia Zagórska	6–1, 6–3
Loss	1.	29 April 2013	Shymkent, Kazakhstan	Clay	(Russia) Polina Monova	(Uzbekistan) Albina Khabibulina (Ukraine) Anastasiya Vasylyeva	6–2, 4–6, [9–11]
Loss	2.	6 May 2013	Shymkent, Kazakhstan	Clay	(Russia) Polina Monova	(Uzbekistan) Albina Khabibulina (Kyrgyzstan) Ksenia Palkina	2–6, 2–6
Loss	3.	12 May 2014	Båstad, Sweden	Clay	(Russia) Liubov Vasilyeva	(Germany) Carolin Daniels (Ukraine) Olga Ianchuk	4–6, 3–6
Loss	4.	9 June 2014	Minsk, Belarus	Clay	(Russia) Liubov Vasilyeva	(Belarus) Lidziya Marozava (Belarus) Sviatlana Pirazhenka	1–6, 3–6
