= Sviatlana Pirazhenka =

Belarusian tennis player

Sviatlana Pirazhenka Святлана Піражэнка
- Full name: Sviatlana Aliaksandrauna Pirazhenka
- Country (sports): Belarus
- Born: 12 September 1992 (age 33) Belarus
- Coach: Andreea Ehritt-Vanc
- Prize money: $100,307

Singles
- Career record: 278–224
- Career titles: 4 ITF
- Highest ranking: No. 371 (18 August 2014)

Doubles
- Career record: 255–200
- Career titles: 20 ITF
- Highest ranking: No. 253 (7 July 2014)

Sviatlana Aliaksandrauna Pirazhenka (Belarusian: Святлана Аляксандраўна Піражэнка; born 12 September 1992) is a Belarusian former tennis player.

In her career, she won four singles and 20 doubles titles on the ITF Women's Circuit. On 18 August 2014, she reached a career-high singles ranking of world No. 371. On 7 July 2014, she peaked at No. 253 in the WTA doubles rankings.

Pirazhenka made her WTA Tour debut at the 2014 Gastein Ladies, partnering Irina Falconi. The pair lost their first-round match against Kateryna Bondarenko and Nicole Melichar in three sets.

== ITF finals ==
=== Singles: 8 (4 titles, 4 runner-ups) ===
Legend $25,000 tournaments $15,000 tournaments $10,000 tournaments	Finals by surface Hard (1–0) Clay (3–3) Carpet (0–1)

Result	No.	Date	Tournament	Surface	Opponent	Score
Loss	1.	22 April 2013	ITF Bournemouth, United Kingdom	Clay	(United Kingdom) Jade Windley	7–6^{(2)}, 4–6, 2–6
Win	1.	27 January 2014	ITF Antalya, Turkey	Clay	(Bosnia and Herzegovina) Jasmina Tinjić	6–3, 6–1
Loss	2.	28 April 2014	ITF Andijan, Uzbekistan	Clay	(Russia) Polina Monova	2–6, 2–6
Win	2.	12 September 2016	ITF Hammamet, Tunisia	Clay	(Argentina) Sofía Luini	6–1, 6–0
Win	3.	25 September 2017	ITF Kyiv, Ukraine	Clay	(Ukraine) Olga Ianchuk	6–4, 6–4
Win	4.	5 November 2017	ITF Pétange, Luxembourg	Hard (i)	(Netherlands) Chayenne Ewijk	6–2, 4–6, 6–0
Loss	3.	3 March 2018	ITF Solarino, Italy	Carpet	(Italy) Stefania Rubini	4–6, 2–6
Loss	4.	26 August 2018	ITF Rotterdam, Netherlands	Clay	(Spain) Marina Bassols Ribera	5–7, 2–6

=== Doubles: 46 (20 titles, 26 runner-ups) ===
Legend $25,000 tournaments $15,000 tournaments $10,000 tournaments	Finals by surface Hard (3–7) Clay (16–18) Carpet (1–1)

Result	No.	Date	Tournament	Surface	Partner	Opponents	Score
Win	1.	14 June 2010	ITF Alkmaar, Netherlands	Clay	(Russia) Anna Arina Marenko	(Belgium) Elyne Boeykens (Australia) Monika Wejnert	6–3, 6–1
Loss	1.	21 February 2011	ITF Zell am Harmersbach, Germany	Carpet (i)	(Belarus) Lidziya Marozava	(Netherlands) Kim Kilsdonk (Netherlands) Nicolette van Uitert	5–7, 4–6
Loss	2.	4 April 2011	ITF Almaty, Kazakhstan	Hard (i)	(Belarus) Lidziya Marozava	(Uzbekistan) Albina Khabibulina (Slovakia) Zuzana Luknárová	6–7^{(2)}, 6–4, [5–10]
Loss	3.	18 June 2012	ITF Alkmaar, Netherlands	Clay	(Germany) Carolin Daniels	(Belgium) Elyne Boeykens (United States) Caitlin Whoriskey	2–6, 4–6
Win	2.	1 October 2012	ITF Antalya, Turkey	Clay	(Ukraine) Elizaveta Ianchuk	(France) Anaïs Laurendon (Czech Republic) Kateřina Vaňková	7–6^{(0)}, 2–6, [10–7]
Win	3.	3 December 2012	ITF Antalya, Turkey	Clay	(Ukraine) Elizaveta Ianchuk	(France) Manon Arcangioli (France) Laëtitia Sarrazin	6–3, 7–5
Win	4.	20 May 2013	ITF Athens, Greece	Hard	(Netherlands) Gabriela van de Graaf	(Greece) Eleni Kordolaimi (Greece) Despoina Vogasari	1–6, 7–5, [10–7]
Loss	4.	24 June 2013	ITF Breda, Netherlands	Clay	(Belgium) Elke Lemmens	(Colombia) María Herazo González (Colombia) María Paulina Pérez	6–1, 6–7^{(2)}, [10–12]
Loss	5.	1 July 2013	ITF Middelburg, Netherlands	Clay	(Oman) Fatma Al-Nabhani	(Ukraine) Veronika Kapshay (Kyrgyzstan) Ksenia Palkina	3–6, 3–6
Win	5.	19 August 2013	ITF Enschede, Netherlands	Clay	(United States) Bernarda Pera	(Netherlands) Anna Katalina Alzate Esmurzaeva (Netherlands) Rosalie van der Hoek	6–2, 6–1
Loss	6.	26 August 2013	ITF Rotterdam, Netherlands	Clay	(Belgium) Elke Lemmens	(France) Amandine Hesse (Netherlands) Demi Schuurs	6–3, 5–7, [4–10]
Loss	7.	14 October 2013	ITF Antalya, Turkey	Clay	(Germany) Julia Wachaczyk	(Austria) Pia König (Poland) Barbara Sobaszkiewicz	1–6, 4–6
Win	6.	27 January 2014	ITF Antalya, Turkey	Clay	(Ukraine) Alyona Sotnikova	(Romania) Irina Bara (Romania) Diana Buzean	7–5, 1–6, [10–7]
Loss	8.	3 February 2014	ITF Antalya, Turkey	Clay	(Romania) Laura-Ioana Andrei	(Bosnia and Herzegovina) Anita Husarić (Ukraine) Alyona Sotnikova	7–5, 4–6, [6–10]
Loss	9.	17 February 2014	ITF Moscow, Russia	Hard (i)	(Russia) Veronika Kudermetova	(Ukraine) Valentyna Ivakhnenko (Ukraine) Kateryna Kozlova	6–7^{(6)}, 4–6
Win	7.	17 March 2014	ITF Ponta Delgada, Portugal	Hard	(Belgium) Elise Mertens	(Czech Republic) Tereza Malíková (Czech Republic) Pernilla Mendesová	6–1, 6–2
Loss	10.	12 May 2014	ITF Zielona Góra, Poland	Clay	(Romania) Ana Bianca Mihăilă	(Russia) Natela Dzalamidze (Poland) Natalia Siedliska	4–6, 1–6
Win	8.	9 June 2014	ITF Minsk, Belarus	Clay	(Belarus) Lidziya Marozava	(Russia) Anna Smolina (Russia) Liubov Vasilyeva	6–1, 6–3
Loss	11.	16 June 2014	ITF Minsk, Belarus	Clay	(Belarus) Lidziya Marozava	(Russia) Irina Khromacheva (Belarus) Ilona Kremen	5–7, 0–6
Win	9.	23 June 2014	ITF Breda, Netherlands	Clay	(Russia) Natela Dzalamidze	(Netherlands) Demi Schuurs (Netherlands) Eva Wacanno	6–4, 6–1
Loss	12.	28 July 2014	ITF Astana, Kazakhstan	Hard	(Belarus) Polina Pekhova	(Russia) Polina Monova (Russia) Ekaterina Yashina	3–6, 2–6
Win	10.	9 March 2015	ITF Antalya, Turkey	Clay	(Sweden) Cornelia Lister	(Germany) Kim Grajdek (Slovakia) Lenka Juríková	7–6^{(6)}, 6–4
Win	11.	22 June 2015	ITF Breda, Netherlands	Clay	(Ukraine) Alyona Sotnikova	(Austria) Barbara Haas (Austria) Pia König	6–3, 6–1
Loss	13.	17 August 2015	ITF Oldenzaal, Netherlands	Clay	(Greece) Valentini Grammatikopoulou	(Belgium) Steffi Distelmans (Netherlands) Kelly Versteeg	3–6, 5–7
Win	12.	15 February 2016	ITF Hammamet, Tunisia	Clay	(Canada) Petra Januskova	(Greece) Despina Papamichail (Slovakia) Chantal Škamlová	6–3, 6–2
Loss	14.	22 February 2016	ITF Hammamet, Tunisia	Clay	(Canada) Petra Januskova	(Greece) Despina Papamichail (Slovakia) Chantal Škamlová	2–6, 7–6^{(5)}, [5–10]
Win	13.	18 April 2016	ITF Shymkent, Kazakhstan	Clay	(Belarus) Ilona Kremen	(Russia) Anastasia Frolova (Kazakhstan) Kamila Kerimbayeva	4–6, 7–6^{(4)}, [10–8]
Win	14.	25 April 2016	ITF Shymkent, Kazakhstan	Clay	(Belarus) Ilona Kremen	(Russia) Anastasia Frolova (Kazakhstan) Kamila Kerimbayeva	6–3, 6–4
Win	15.	20 June 2016	ITF Breda, Netherlands	Clay	(Greece) Valentini Grammatikopoulou	(United States) Dasha Ivanova (Czech Republic) Petra Krejsová	7–6^{(6)}, 6–4
Loss	15.	18 July 2016	ITF Astana, Kazakhstan	Hard	(Ukraine) Alyona Sotnikova	(Russia) Anastasia Frolova (Russia) Angelina Gabueva	2–6, 3–6
Loss	16.	22 August 2016	ITF Rotterdam, Netherlands	Clay	(Netherlands) Rosalie van der Hoek	(Denmark) Karen Barritza (United States) Chiara Scholl	2–6, 3–6
Loss	17.	12 September 2016	ITF Hammamet, Tunisia	Clay	(Italy) Angelica Moratelli	(France) Kassandra Davesne (Slovakia) Barbara Kötelesová	w/o
Win	16.	19 September 2016	ITF Hammamet, Tunisia	Clay	(Belgium) Catherine Chantraine	(Romania) Cristina Adamescu (Switzerland) Karin Kennel	6–4, 7–5
Win	17.	5 December 2016	ITF Solapur, India	Hard	(Russia) Anastasia Gasanova	(Egypt) Ola Abou Zekry (Russia) Anastasia Pribylova	6–4, 7–5
Loss	18.	19 December 2016	ITF Navi Mumbai, India	Hard	(Russia) Anastasia Pribylova	(South Korea) Choi Ji-hee (South Korea) Kim Na-ri	5–7, 1–6
Loss	19.	18 February 2017	ITF Hammamet, Tunisia	Clay	(Greece) Eleni Kordolaimi	(Slovakia) Vivien Juhászová (Kazakhstan) Kamila Kerimbayeva	6–3, 4–6, [8–10]
Loss	20.	24 June 2017	ITF Alkmaar, Netherlands	Clay	(Netherlands) Erika Vogelsang	(Australia) Sally Peers (Netherlands) Rosalie van der Hoek	3–6, 1–6
Win	18.	26 November 2017	ITF Antalya, Turkey	Clay	(Ukraine) Maryna Chernyshova	(Bulgaria) Dia Evtimova (Hungary) Réka Luca Jani	6–4, 6–1
Win	19.	2 March 2018	ITF Solarino, Italy	Carpet	(United States) Quinn Gleason	(Germany) Anna Klasen (Germany) Romy Kölzer	6–4, 6–4
Loss	21.	4 May 2018	ITF Tbilisi, Georgia	Hard	(Netherlands) Erika Vogelsang	(Slovakia) Tereza Mihalíková (Brazil) Laura Pigossi	4–6, 1–6
Loss	22.	18 May 2018	ITF San Severo, Italy	Clay	(Georgia (country)) Sofia Shapatava	(Chinese Taipei) Chen Pei-hsuan (Chinese Taipei) Wu Fang-hsien	3–6, 4–6
Loss	23.	23 June 2018	ITF Kaltenkirchen, Germany	Clay	(Israel) Vlada Ekshibarova	(Germany) Anna Gabric (Germany) Katharina Gerlach	2–6, 7–5, [8–10]
Loss	24.	21 July 2018	ITF Figueira da Foz, Portugal	Hard	(France) Jessika Ponchet	(Spain) Yvonne Cavallé Reimers (Venezuela) Andrea Gámiz	2–6, 5–7
Loss	25.	3 August 2018	ITF Biella, Italy	Clay	(Italy) Dalila Spiteri	(Italy) Costanza Traversi (Italy) Aurora Zantedeschi	2–6, 3–6
Win	20.	25 August 2018	ITF Rotterdam, Netherlands	Clay	(Netherlands) Suzan Lamens	(Netherlands) Dewi Dijkman (Netherlands) Isabelle Haverlag	6–3, 4–6, [10–5]
Loss	26.	24 August 2019	ITF Moscow, Russia	Clay	(Russia) Ekaterina Makarova	(Russia) Elina Avanesyan (Russia) Taisya Pachkaleva	2–6, 5–7
