= 2012 Baku Cup – Doubles =

Doubles
- 2012 Baku Cup

Final
- Champions: (Ukraine) Irina Buryachok (Russia) Valeria Solovyeva
- Runners-up: (Czech Republic) Eva Birnerová (Italy) Alberta Brianti
- Score: 6–3, 6–2

Details
- Draw: 16
- Seeds: 4

Events
Singles	Doubles
- Baku Cup

Mariya Koryttseva and Tatiana Poutchek were the defending champions but decided not to participate.
Irina Buryachok and Valeria Solovyeva won the final 6–3, 6–2 against Eva Birnerová and Alberta Brianti.

== Seeds ==
1. (Russia) Nina Bratchikova / (Russia) Alexandra Panova (semifinals)
2. (Russia) Alla Kudryavtseva / (Thailand) Tamarine Tanasugarn (quarterfinals)
3. (Czech Republic) Eva Birnerová / (Italy) Alberta Brianti (final)
4. (Ukraine) Irina Buryachok / (Russia) Valeria Solovyeva (champions)

== Draw ==
Key

- Q = Qualifier
- WC = Wild card
- LL = Lucky loser
- Alt = Alternate
- ITF = ITF entry
- PR = Protected ranking
- SR = Special ranking
- SE = Special exempt
- JE = Junior exempt
- JR = Junior Accelerator Programme entrant
- CO = College Accelerator Programme entrant
- NG = Next Gen Accelerator Program entrant
- w/o = Walkover
- r = Retired
- d = Defaulted

=== Draw ===
First round
1	(Russia) N Bratchikova (Russia) A Panova	6	6
(Poland) M Domachowska (Luxembourg) M Minella	3	4
(Thailand) N Lertcheewakarn (China) Y Zhou
(France) C Garcia (Russia) A Smolina	w/o
4	(Ukraine) I Buryachok (Russia) V Solovyeva	7^{7}	6
(Georgia (country)) E Gorgodze (Ukraine) E Svitolina	6^{3}	2
(Kazakhstan) K Pervak (Ukraine) L Tsurenko	2	3
(Belarus) E Dzehalevich (Russia) O Puchkova	6	6
WC	(Azerbaijan) K Farhad (Ukraine) O Korashvili	1	3
WC	(Russia) V Flink (Austria) P Mayr-Achleitner	6	6
(Australia) S Bengson (Poland) S Zaniewska	2	3
3	(Czech Republic) E Birnerová (Italy) A Brianti	6	6
(Serbia) B Jovanovski (Serbia) A Krunić	4	6	[3]
(United States) J Cohen (Australia) S Jones	6	3	[10]
(Spain) E Cabeza Candela (Spain) L Pous Tió
2	(Russia) A Kudryavtseva (Thailand) T Tanasugarn	w/o

Quarterfinals
1	(Russia) N Bratchikova (Russia) A Panova	6	6
(France) C Garcia (Russia) A Smolina	0	0
4	(Ukraine) I Buryachok (Russia) V Solovyeva	6	6
(Belarus) E Dzehalevich (Russia) O Puchkova	2	3
WC	(Russia) V Flink (Austria) P Mayr-Achleitner	4	2
3	(Czech Republic) E Birnerová (Italy) A Brianti	6	6
(United States) J Cohen (Australia) S Jones	3	6	[11]
2	(Russia) A Kudryavtseva (Thailand) T Tanasugarn	6	4	[9]

Semifinals
1	(Russia) N Bratchikova (Russia) A Panova	3	1
4	(Ukraine) I Buryachok (Russia) V Solovyeva	6	6
3	(Czech Republic) E Birnerová (Italy) A Brianti	3	6	[10]
(United States) J Cohen (Australia) S Jones	6	4	[5]

Final
4	(Ukraine) I Buryachok (Russia) V Solovyeva	6	6
3	(Czech Republic) E Birnerová (Italy) A Brianti	3	2
