= Anna Arina Marenko =

Russian tennis player

Anna Arina Marenko Анна Арина Марьенко
- Country (sports): Russia
- Born: 2 January 1992 (age 33); Moscow, Russia
- Height: 1.70 m (5 ft 7 in)
- Turned pro: 2008
- Plays: Right (two-handed backhand)
- Prize money: $20,158

Singles
- Career record: 48–54
- Career titles: 0
- Highest ranking: No. 411 (4 July 2011)

Doubles
- Career record: 42–38
- Career titles: 5 ITF
- Highest ranking: No. 338 (20 December 2010)

Anna Arina Viktorovna Marenko (Russian: Анна-Арина Викторовна Марьенко; born 2 January 1992) is a Russian former professional tennis player.

Her highest WTA singles ranking is 411, which she reached on 4 July 2011. Her best WTA doubles ranking is 338, which she achieved on 20 December 2010. She is the half-sister of professional tennis player Andrey Rublev.

== ITF Circuit finals ==
Legend
$50,000 tournaments
$25,000 tournaments
$10,000 tournaments

=== Singles: 1 (runner-up) ===
Result	Date	Tournament	Surface	Opponent	Score
Loss	Aug 2010	ITF St. Petersburg, Russia	Clay	(Russia) Nadejda Guskova	2–6, 6–7^{(5)}

=== Doubles: 7 (5 titles, 2 runner-ups) ===
Result	No.	Date	Tournament	Surface	Partner	Opponents	Score
Loss	1.	Feb 2010	Burnie International, Australia	Hard	(Hungary) Tímea Babos	(Australia) Jessica Moore (Australia) Arina Rodionova	2–6, 4–6
Win	2.	May 2010	ITF Moscow, Russia	Clay	(Russia) Ekaterina Yakovleva	(Russia) Marina Shamayko (Serbia) Aleksandra Krunić	6–2, 6–2
Win	3.	Jun 2010	ITF Alkmaar, Netherlands	Clay	(Belarus) Sviatlana Pirazhenka	(Belgium) Elyne Boeykens (Australia) Monika Wejnert	6–3, 6–1
Loss	4.	Jun 2010	ITF Rotterdam, Holland	Clay	(Russia) Ekaterina Yakovleva	(Czech Republic) Iveta Gerlová (Czech Republic) Jana Orlová	4–6, 6–4, [5–10]
Win	5.	Dec 2010	ITF Vinaros, Spain	Clay	(Spain) Arabela; Fernandez-Rabener	(Romania) Cristina Dinu (Romania) Ionela-Andreea Iova	7–6^{(4)}, 7–5
Win	6.	Dec 2010	ITF Benicarló, Spain	Clay	(Spain) Arabela; Fernandez-Rabener	(Italy) Anastasia Grymalska (Italy) Andreea Văideanu	6–3, 7–6^{(1)}
Win	7.	Mar 2012	ITF Moscow, Russia	Carpet (i)	(Russia) Margarita Gasparyan	(Ukraine) Valentyna Ivakhnenko (Ukraine) Kateryna Kozlova	3–6, 7–6, [10–6]
