= Margarita Betova =

Russian tennis player (born 1994)

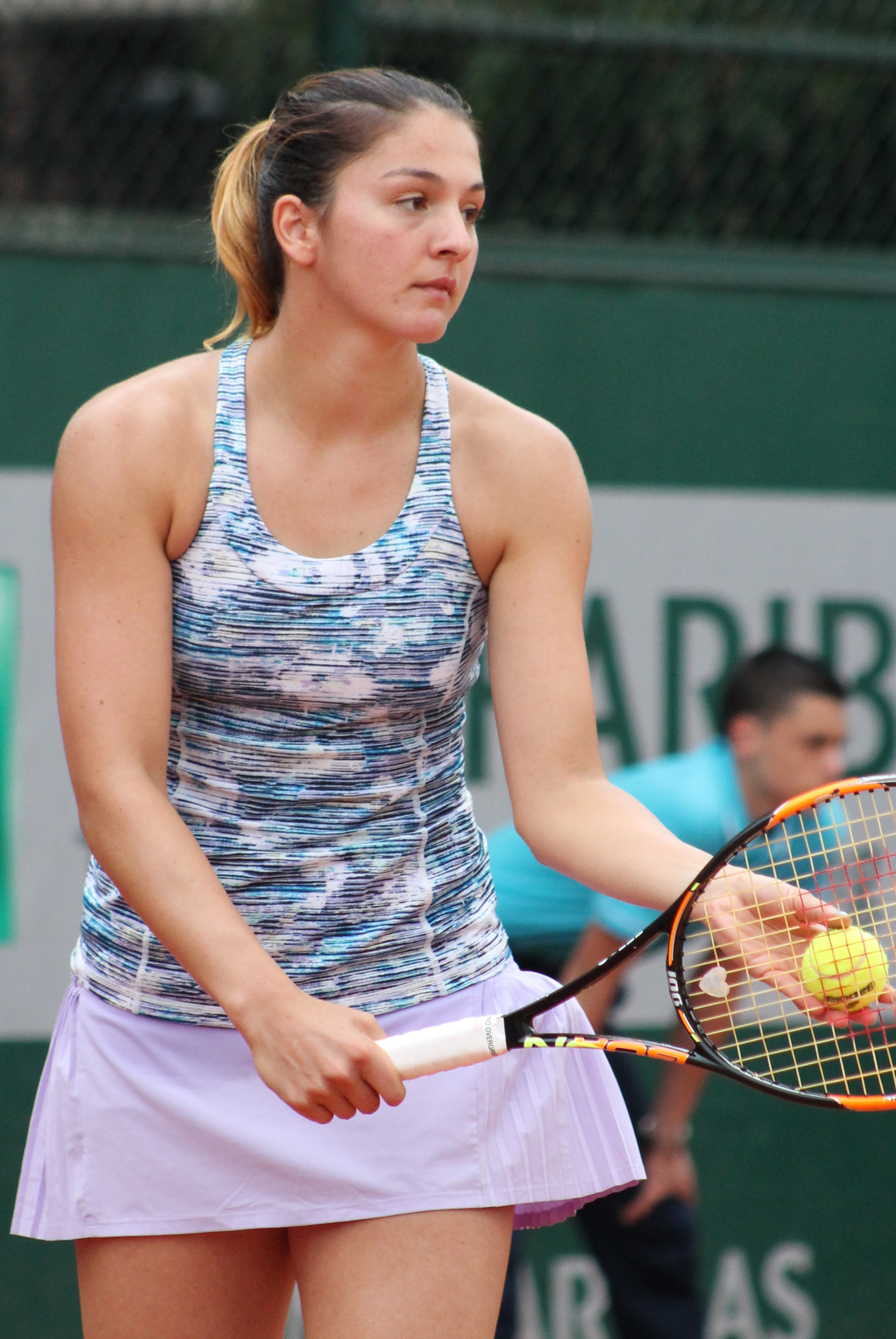
- Gasparyan at the 2016 French Open
- Full name: Margarita Melikovna Betova
- Country (sports): Russia
- Residence: Moscow
- Born: 1 September 1994 (age 32) Moscow, Russia
- Height: 1.83 m (6 ft 0 in)
- Turned pro: 2010
- Plays: Right (one-handed backhand)
- Coach: Carlos Martinez
- Prize money: US$ 2,121,901

Singles
- Career record: 223–161
- Career titles: 2
- Highest ranking: No. 41 (15 February 2016)

Grand Slam singles results
- Australian Open: 4R (2016)
- French Open: 1R (2015, 2016, 2019, 2020, 2021)
- Wimbledon: 2R (2019)
- US Open: 2R (2019, 2020)

Doubles
- Career record: 121–69
- Career titles: 4
- Highest ranking: No. 25 (6 June 2016)
- Current ranking: No. 1,346 (28 September 2016)

Grand Slam doubles results
- Australian Open: 2R (2016)
- French Open: SF (2016)
- Wimbledon: 2R (2015)
- US Open: 2R (2015, 2018)

Team competitions
- Fed Cup: F (2013), record 1–4
- Last updated on: 30 September 2026.

Margarita Melikovna Betova (née Gasparyan; Russian: Маргари́та Ме́ликовна Гаспаря́н, IPA: [mərɡɐˈrʲitə ɡəspɐˈrʲan], Armenian: Մարգարիտա Մելիքի Գասպարյան; born 1 September 1994) is a Russian tennis player.

Betova has won two singles and four doubles titles on the WTA Tour, as well as nine singles and eight doubles titles on the ITF Women's Circuit. On 15 February 2016, she reached her career-high singles ranking of world No. 41, and on 6 June 2016, she reached her best doubles ranking of No. 25.

In 2015, she won both her first singles and doubles titles during the same week, a feat she achieved at the Baku Cup.

== Personal life ==
Born to an Armenian father, Melik, and a Russian mother, Lyudmila, Gasparyan began playing tennis at age 5. Her father was a weightlifter for some time, and her mother was a biathlonist. Margarita's home club is CSKA Moscow.

The 27-year-old Margarita married Belarusian tennis player Sergey Betov in July 2021. On 23 December 2021, she gave birth to a son, Daniil Betov.

== Career ==
=== 2010–14: Early years ===
Gasparyan started her pro career at the 10k tournament in St. Petersburg in mid-March 2010, losing in the first qualifying round. Her first successful appearance was in another 10k tournament in Minsk, reaching the quarterfinals in singles and semifinals in doubles, respectively. Her first final was in Tyumen in doubles with Natela Dzalamidze in the very end of 2011, losing 0–6, 2–6 to Darya Kustova and Olga Savchuk.

In 2012, Gasparyan won four singles titles on the ITF Circuit, all under the category 25k. All of her singles titles came from Russia. She was awarded a wildcard into the Kremlin Cup but lost to Lucie Šafářová, in three sets.

At the end of the 2013 season, Gasparyan was called by Shamil Tarpischev to be part of the Russian team for the Fed Cup Final against Italy, in early November. Afterward, she won her fifth ITF title in Minsk.

The 2014 WTA Tour was for Gasparyan more productive especially by season's end in singles, and in doubles, she improved as she won two bigger ITF tournaments out of four, one being a top-levelled tournament in Astana, Kazakhstan.

Gasparyan qualified for the Tashkent Open, but lost in the first round. She debuted at a Grand Slam tournament when she was in the qualifying draw at the US Open. At the end of the season, Gasparyan saw good results in Sharm El Sheikh, Egypt, winning one tournament.

=== 2015: First WTA Tour titles, major main-draw debut ===
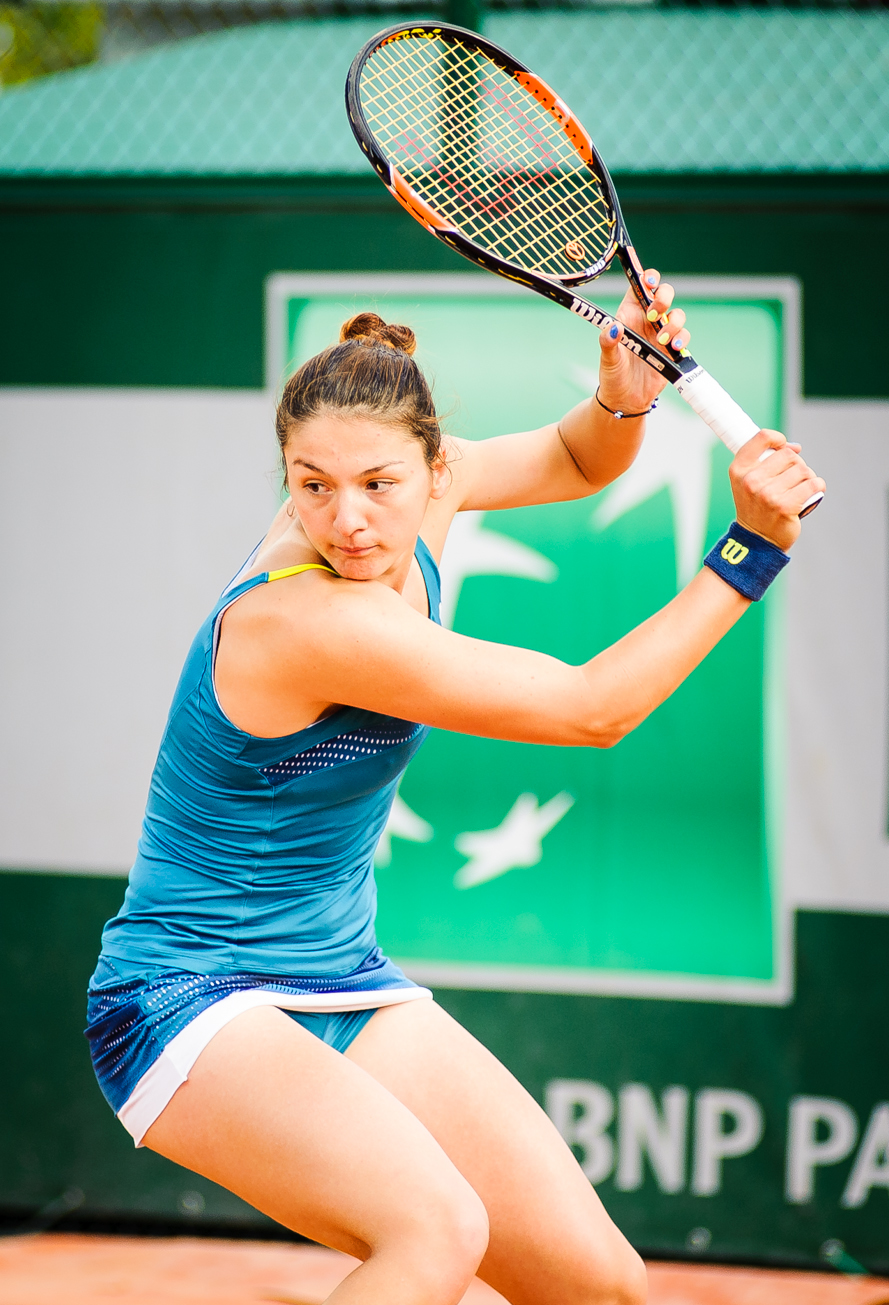
Gasparyan at the 2015 French Open

Gasparyan won three ITF singles tournaments and one doubles tournament, former being a top-level one. She achieved her first loss in an ITF final, also a 100k tournament, in Trnava, Slovakia, where she lost to Danka Kovinić. She then played on the WTA Tour.

In May, Gasparyan made her major main-draw debut at the French Open, where she lost in two sets to Ana Konjuh as a qualifier. On June 29, she made her second major main-draw entry as a qualifier at Wimbledon, where she lost to the top seed Serena Williams in the first round.

At the İstanbul Cup, Gasparyan played Tsvetana Pironkova, after getting past the qualifying rounds. Despite winning the first set 6–0 and having two match points, she lost the match 6–0, 6–7, 6–7. Gasparyan won her first WTA Tour title in Baku, defeating Patricia Maria Țig in the final. She became the first one-handed backhand player to win in the 2015 WTA season. As a result, her singles ranking rose to a career-high No. 71. Gasparyan, also with her win in the doubles event alongside title defender Alexandra Panova, rose to No. 84 in the doubles rankings. She lost in the qualifying rounds at the US Open, losing to American wildcard Jessica Pegula in straight sets.

Gasparyan then lost in the second round of the Tashkent Open to German Anna-Lena Friedsam, in straight sets. However, she won her second doubles title of the year there with Alexandra Panova. At the Ladies Linz, Gasparyan upset sixth seed Camila Giorgi in the second round, before losing to Friedsam again. At the Kremlin Cup, Gasparyan upset ninth seed Kristina Mladenovic in the second round but lost to eventual finalist Anastasia Pavlyuchenkova in the quarterfinals. In her last tournament of the year, Gasparyan reached the quarterfinals of the WTA Challenger Open de Seine-et-Marne, retiring in the match against Francesca Schiavone.

Gasparyan ended the season as world No. 62, her first season ending in the top 100 and winning her first career singles title.

=== 2016: Top 50, French Open doubles semifinal ===
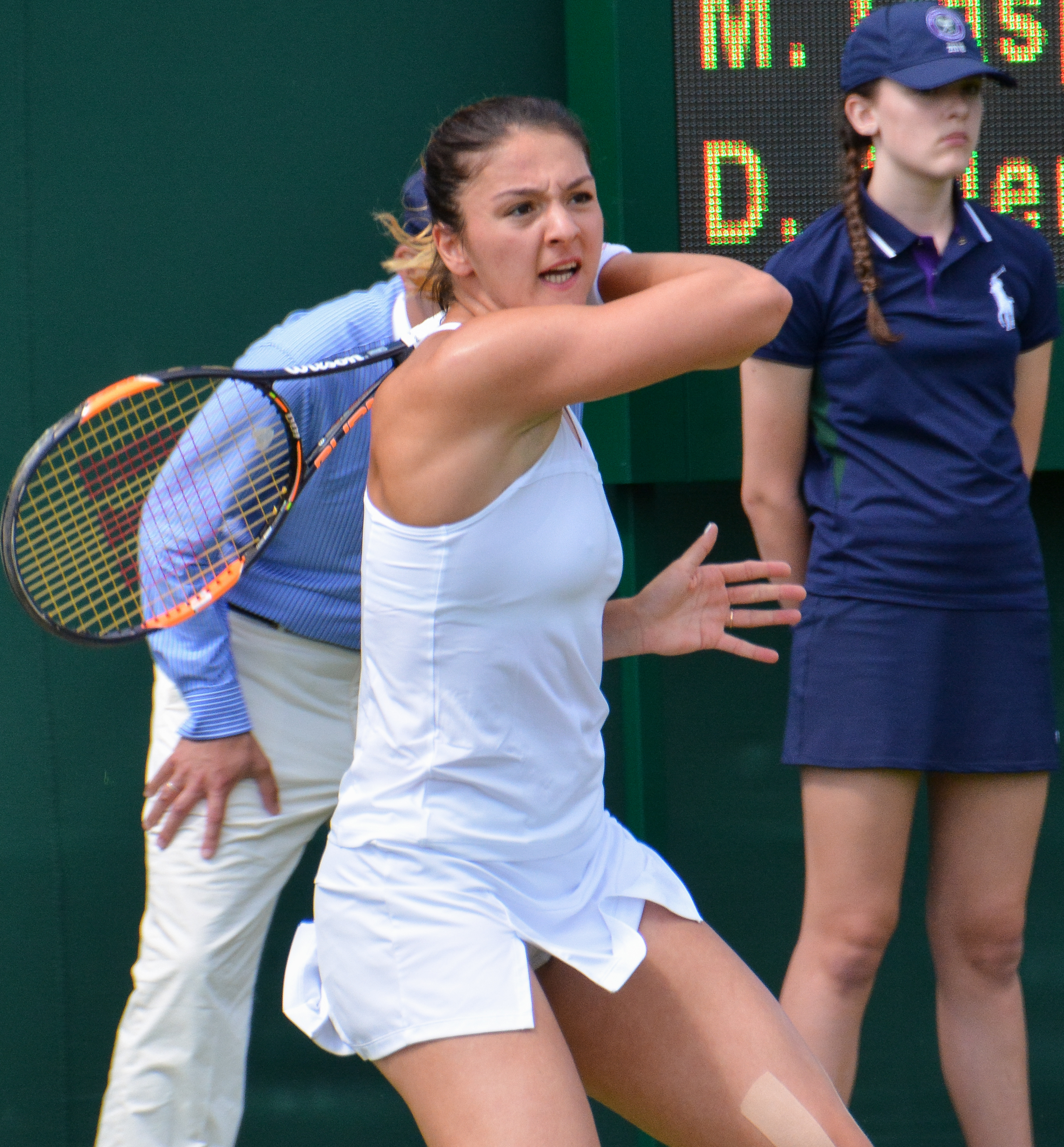
Gasparyan at the 2016 Wimbledon Championships

Gasparyan played in Brisbane, but lost in the first round to compatriot Ekaterina Makarova. In Hobart, Gasparyan lost in the second round to Johanna Larsson.

In the Australian Open, she managed to reach the fourth round, her best to date performance at a major, after upsetting 17th seed Sara Errani in the first round. She then lost to world No. 1, Serena Williams, in straight sets.

At the inaugural St. Petersburg Trophy, Gasparyan reached the second round, then lost to Ana Ivanovic. In Doha, she caused a big upset by defeating Karolína Plíšková in just 49 minutes. At the Indian Wells Open, Gasparyan lost to ninth seed Roberta Vinci in the second round, despite having two match points.

She debuted for Team Russia at the 2016 Fed Cup against Belarus in the World Group play-offs.

After Wimbledon, Gasparyan underwent surgery due to an injury, and she was not able to participate over a specific time period. Among the tournaments she skipped were the Summer Olympics, where she planned to partner with Kuznetsova in doubles.

=== 2017–2018: Recovery from injury, second title and return to top 100 ===
Gasparyan came back to tennis in late 2017, participating in the qualifying rounds of the Kremlin Cup, after experiencing three knee surgeries.

In 2018, she reached the final of a 25k event in Spain, losing to Paula Badosa. She then entered her first WTA tournament since coming back from injury, the Jiangxi International Open in Nanchang, China, reaching the second round where she lost to Zhang Shuai.

She was granted a protected ranking and entered the main draw of the US Open. In the first round, she was defeated by world No. 4 Angelique Kerber in straight sets. Gasparyan became the second lowest-ranked player to win a WTA title when she won the Tashkent Open with a ranking of No. 299, defeating Anastasia Potapova in the final. She also claimed top 100 wins over Tatjana Maria and Mona Barthel in the process, making her return to the top 200.

Gasparyan extended her winning streak at the Upper Austria Ladies Linz by reaching the quarterfinals, where she earned the first top-10 win of her career over Kiki Bertens in the second round. Another WTA Tour quarterfinal followed at the Luxembourg Open when she upset Maria Sakkari in straight sets.

She ended her first full comeback season with back-to-back WTA 125 semifinals at the 2018 Mumbai Open and the Open de Limoges, returning to the top 100 for the first time since 2016.

=== 2019: Return to top 60, first WTA Premier doubles title ===
Gasparyan started her season at the Australian Open where she reached the second round, losing to Elise Mertens in straight sets. She then qualified for the main draw at the St. Petersburg Ladies' Trophy, but lost to former Grand Slam champion Victoria Azarenka in the first round. Despite her early exit in singles, she managed to win the biggest doubles title of her career alongside Ekaterina Makarova in St. Petersburg as an unseeded pair.

She reached her first quarterfinal of the year at the İstanbul Cup, where she upset second seed Mihaela Buzărnescu in three sets. She defeated compatriot Veronika Kudermetova but retired in her semifinal match against eventual champion Petra Martić.

Gasparyan returned stronger during the grass-court season, upsetting seventh seed Viktória Kužmová in the first round of the Rosmalen Grass Court Championships. She then stunned Elina Svitolina for her first top-10 win of the year at the Birmingham Classic. At Wimbledon, she was close to repeating her victory over Svitolina in the second round but was forced to retire in the second set.

The Russian went on a winless run until the US Open, where she won her first match since July against Priscilla Hon in the first round. However, she won just one game in the second round against Johanna Konta. Gasparyan failed to defend her title at the Tashkent Open, losing to Danka Kovinić in the second round. She made another WTA quarterfinal at the Luxembourg Open but was forced to retire against Blinkova to end her season. As a result of not defending her WTA 125 tournament points, she ended the year outside the top 100.

=== 2020: More injury struggles ===
Gasparyan began 2020 by qualifying for the main draw at the Shenzhen Open, but lost to second seed Aryna Sabalenka in convincing fashion. She then suffered her first opening-round exit at the Australian Open in her career, losing to Maria Sakkari.

She returned to action at the Rosmalen Open but lost in the first qualifying round. She ended a six-match losing streak at the US Open, defeating former Olympic gold medalist Monica Puig in three sets, which was her second top 100 victory of the season. However, she lost to Serena Williams in a tight match in the Arthur Ashe Stadium.

Held during the second week of the US Open, Gasparyan made the second round of the İstanbul Cup but was forced to retire against Rebecca Peterson due to an injury. She lost in the opening round of the French Open to Elise Mertens, in straight sets.

=== 2021: Resurgence, return to top 100 followed by a lengthy injury layoff ===
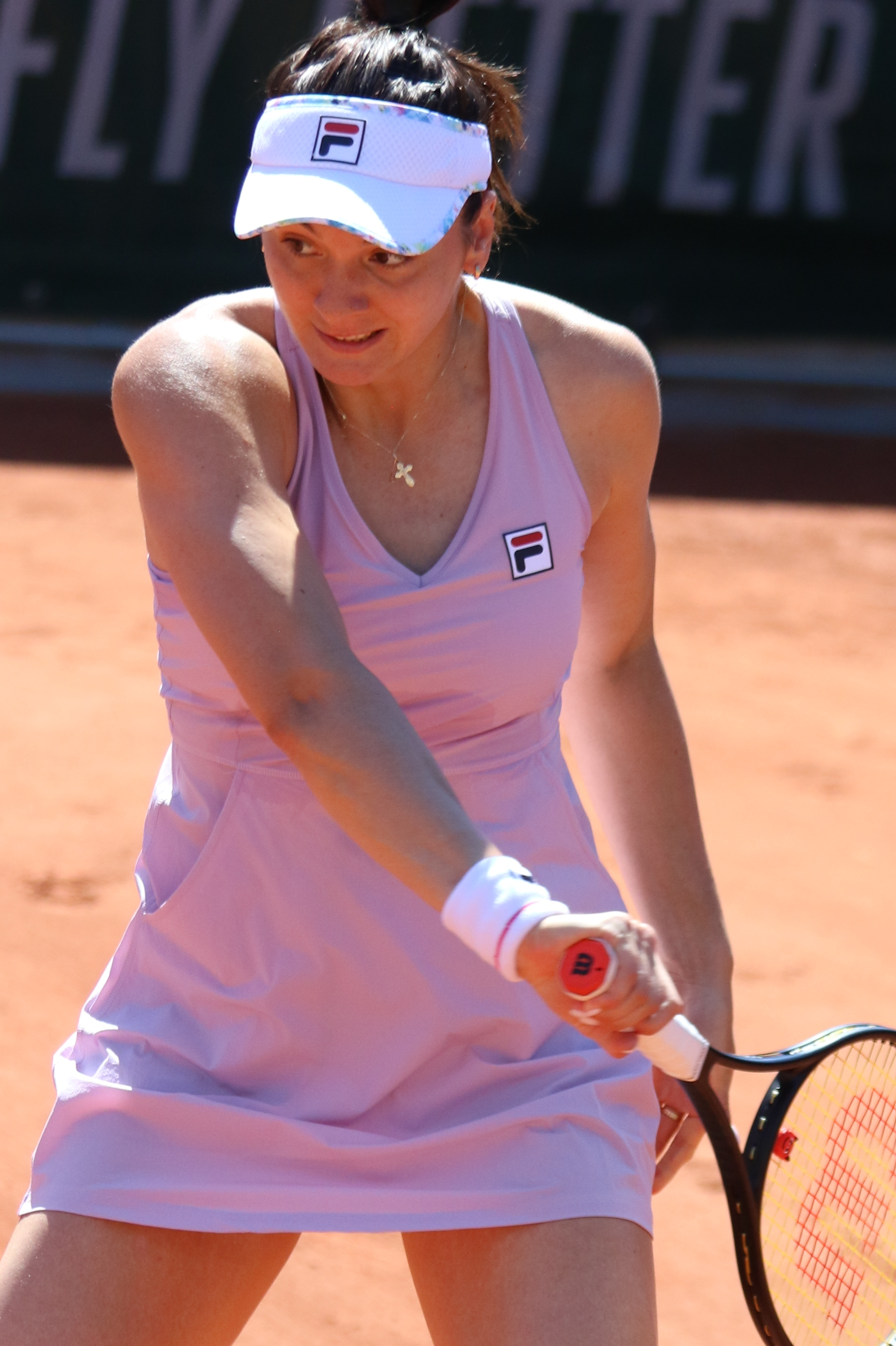
Gasparyan at the 2021 French Open

Gasparyan started 2021 at the Australian Open, where she lost to Garbiñe Muguruza in the first round.

Handed a wildcard at the St. Petersburg Ladies' Trophy, Gasparyan beat Kateřina Siniaková to reach her first WTA 500 quarterfinal since 2015. Continuing her good form, Gasparyan defeated top seed Ekaterina Alexandrova in straight sets and Vera Zvonareva to reach the biggest final of her career. However, she was forced to retire in the final against Daria Kasatkina. With her run, she managed to return to the top 100 for the first time in over a year.

She endured through a five-match losing streak on clay, with her last match of the season being a comprehensive loss against Ann Li in the first round of the French Open, winning just one game. She was inactive for the rest of the year, falling out of the top 150 at the end of the season. Meanwhile, she got married in the summer of 2021.

=== 2023–24: Comeback ===
Betova lost her rankings, before she came back in February 2023 and played her first qualifying matches at the Abu Dhabi Open and the Dubai Open.

She used her protected ranking to enter the qualifying stages at the 2023 Birmingham Classic and 2023 Eastbourne International, along with the main draw at Wimbledon, where she lost to Kaja Juvan in the first round.

Again using her protected ranking, Betova entered the 2024 Hong Kong Tennis Open but lost in the first round to qualifier Shi Han.

== Performance timelines ==
Key
W	F	SF	QF	#R	RR	Q#	P#	DNQ	A	Z#	PO	G	S	B	NMS	NTI	P	NH

(W) winner; (F) finalist; (SF) semifinalist; (QF) quarterfinalist; (#R) rounds 4, 3, 2, 1; (RR) round-robin stage; (Q#) qualification round; (P#) preliminary round; (DNQ) did not qualify; (A) absent; (Z#) Davis/Fed Cup Zonal Group (with number indication) or (PO) play-off; (G) gold, (S) silver or (B) bronze Olympic/Paralympic medal; (NMS) not a Masters tournament; (NTI) not a Tier I tournament; (P) postponed; (NH) not held; (SR) strike rate (events won / competed); (W–L) win–loss record.
To avoid confusion and double counting, these charts are updated at the conclusion of a tournament or when the player's participation has ended.

Only main-draw results in WTA Tour, Grand Slam tournaments, Fed Cup/Billie Jean King Cup, Hopman Cup, United Cup and Olympic Games are included in win–loss records.

=== Singles ===
Current through the 2023 US Open.

Tournament	2012	2013	2014	2015	2016	2017	2018	2019	2020	2021	2022	2023	SR	W–L	Win %
Grand Slam tournaments
Australian Open	A	A	A	A	4R	A	A	2R	1R	1R	A	A	0 / 4	4–4	50%
French Open	A	A	A	1R	1R	A	A	1R	1R	1R	A	A	0 / 5	0–5	0%
Wimbledon	A	A	A	1R	1R	A	A	2R	NH	A	A	1R	0 / 4	1–4	20%
US Open	A	A	Q1	Q2	A	A	1R	2R	2R	A	A	1R	0 / 4	2–4	33%
Win–loss	0–0	0–0	0–0	0–2	3–3	0–0	0–1	3–4	1–3	0–2	0–0	0–2	0 / 17	7–17	29%
National representation
Billie Jean King Cup (Note: Formerly known as Fed Cup until 2020.)	A	F	A	A	1R	A	A	PO2	A (Note: Edition is split into the two years due to COVID-19.)		A	A	0 / 2	0–2	0%
WTA 1000
Dubai / Qatar Open (Note: The first Premier 5 event of the year has switched back and forth between the Dubai Tennis Championships and the Qatar Ladies Open since 2009. Dubai was classified as a Premier 5 event from 2009 to 2011 before being succeeded by Doha for the 2012–2014 period. In 2015, Dubai regained its Premier 5 status while Doha was demoted to Premier status. The Premier 5 tournaments were reclassified as WTA 1000 tournaments in 2021.)	A	A	A	A	2R	A	A	A	Q1	A	A	Q1	0 / 1	1–1	50%
Indian Wells Open	A	A	A	A	2R	A	A	A	NH	A	A	A	0 / 1	1–1	50%
Miami Open	A	A	A	A	2R	A	A	1R	NH	A	A	A	0 / 2	1–2	33%
Madrid Open	A	A	A	A	1R	A	A	1R	NH	Q1	A	A	0 / 2	0–2	0%
Italian Open	A	A	A	A	1R	A	A	Q1	A	Q1	A	A	0 / 1	0–1	0%
Cincinnati Open	A	A	A	A	A	A	A	Q1	Q1	A	A	A	0 / 0	0–0	–
Win–loss	0–0	0–0	0–0	0–0	3–5	0–0	0–0	0–2	0–0	0–0	0–0	0–0	0 / 7	3–7	30%
Career statistics
	2012	2013	2014	2015	2016	2017	2018	2019	2020	2021	2022	2023	SR	W–L	Win %
Tournaments	1	0	1	7	12	0	6	19	5	5	0	2	Career total: 58		
Titles	0	0	0	1	0	0	1	0	0	0	0	0	Career total: 2		
Finals	0	0	0	1	0	0	1	0	0	1	0	0	Career total: 3		
Overall win–loss	0–1	0–0	0–1	10–6	8–14	0–0	11–5	14–19	2–5	5–5	0–0	0–2	2 / 58	50–58	46%
Year-end ranking (Note: 2011: WTA ranking–648.)	231	318	217	62	115	—	105	87	125	164	—		$2,029,929		

=== Doubles ===
Current through the 2021 St. Petersburg Trophy.

Tournament	2011	2012	2013	2014	2015	2016	2017	2018	2019	2020	2021	SR	W–L
Grand Slam tournaments
Australian Open	A	A	A	A	A	2R	A	A	2R	A	A	0 / 2	2–2
French Open	A	A	A	A	A	SF	A	A	A	A	A	0 / 1	4–1
Wimbledon	A	A	A	A	2R	1R	A	A	1R	NH	A	0 / 3	1–3
US Open	A	A	A	A	2R	A	A	2R	1R	A	A	0 / 3	2–3
Win–loss	0–0	0–0	0–0	0–0	2–2	5–3	0–0	1–1	1–3	0–0	0–0	0 / 9	9–9
WTA 1000
Dubai / Qatar Open	A	A	A	A	A	2R	A	A	A	A	A	0 / 1	1–1
Indian Wells Open	A	A	A	A	A	2R	A	A	A	NH	A	0 / 1	1–1
Miami Open	A	A	A	A	A	SF	A	A	A	NH	A	0 / 1	3–1
Madrid Open	A	A	A	A	A	2R	A	A	A	NH	A	0 / 1	1–1
Career statistics
Tournaments	1	1	1	3	7	9	0	3	8	1	2	Career total: 36	
Titles	0	0	0	0	2	1	0	0	1	0	0	Career total: 4	
Finals	0	0	0	1	2	1	0	0	2	0	0	Career total: 6	
Overall win–loss	0–1	0–1	0–2	5–3	9–5	15–8	0–0	4–3	10–7	0–1	0–2	4 / 36	43–33
Year-end ranking	747	280	243	99	75	41	—	218	94	255	1604		

== WTA Tour finals ==
=== Singles: 3 (2 titles, 1 runner-up) ===
Legend
WTA 500 (0–1)
International (2–0)

Result	W–L	Date	Tournament	Tier	Surface	Opponent	Score
Win	1–0	Aug 2015	Baku Cup, Azerbaijan	International	Hard	(Romania) Patricia Maria Țig	6–3, 5–7, 6–0
Win	2–0	Sep 2018	Tashkent Open, Uzbekistan	International	Hard	(Russia) Anastasia Potapova	6–2, 6–1
Loss	2–1	Mar 2021	St. Petersburg Trophy, Russia	WTA 500	Hard (i)	(Russia) Daria Kasatkina	3–6, 1–2 ret.

=== Doubles: 6 (4 titles, 2 runner-ups) ===
Legend
Premier (1–0)
International (3–2)

Result	W–L	Date	Tournament	Tier	Surface	Partner	Opponents	Score
Loss	0–1	Sep 2014	Tashkent Open, Uzbekistan	International	Hard	(Russia) Alexandra Panova	(Serbia) Aleksandra Krunić (Czech Republic) Kateřina Siniaková	2–6, 1–6
Win	1–1	Aug 2015	Baku Cup, Azerbaijan	International	Hard	(Russia) Alexandra Panova	(Russia) Vitalia Diatchenko (Ukraine) Olga Savchuk	6–3, 7–5
Win	2–1	Oct 2015	Tashkent Open, Uzbekistan	International	Hard	(Russia) Alexandra Panova	(Russia) Vera Dushevina (Czech Republic) Kateřina Siniaková	6–1, 3–6, [10–3]
Win	3–1	Apr 2016	Prague Open, Czech Republic	International	Clay	(Czech Republic) Andrea Hlaváčková	(Argentina) María Irigoyen (Poland) Paula Kania	6–4, 6–2
Win	4–1	Feb 2019	St. Petersburg Trophy, Russia	Premier	Hard (i)	(Russia) Ekaterina Makarova	(Russia) Anna Kalinskaya (Slovakia) Viktória Kužmová	7–5, 7–5
Loss	4–2	Aug 2019	Bronx Open, US	International	Hard	(Romania) Monica Niculescu	(Croatia) Darija Jurak (Spain) María José Martínez Sánchez	5–7, 6–2, [7–10]

== WTA 125 finals ==
=== Doubles: 1 (runner-up) ===
Result	Date	Tournament	Surface	Partner	Opponents	Score
Loss	Nov 2015	Open de Limoges, France	Hard	(Georgia (country)) Oksana Kalashnikova	(Czech Republic) Barbora Krejčíková (Luxembourg) Mandy Minella	6–1, 5–7, [6–10]

== ITF Circuit finals ==
=== Singles: 11 (9 titles, 2 runner-ups) ===
Legend
$100,000 tournaments (0–1)
$50,000 tournaments (1–0)
$25,000 tournaments (8–1)

Result	W–L	Date	Tournament	Tier	Surface	Opponents	Score
Win	1–0	Mar 2012	ITF Moscow, Russia	25,000	Carpet (i)	(Ukraine) Lyudmyla Kichenok	6–0, ret.
Win	2–0	May 2012	ITF Moscow, Russia	25,000	Hard (i)	(Turkey) Çağla Büyükakçay	6–3, 4–6, 6–1
Win	3–0	May 2012	ITF Moscow, Russia	25,000	Clay	(Russia) Daria Gavrilova	4–6, 6–4, 7–6
Win	4–0	Sep 2012	ITF Yoshkar-Ola, Russia	25,000	Hard	(Ukraine) Nadiia Kichenok	7–5, 7–6
Win	5–0	Nov 2013	ITF Minsk, Belarus	25,000	Hard (i)	(Ukraine) Anastasiya Vasylyeva	6–4, 6–4
Win	6–0	Nov 2014	ITF Sharm El Sheikh, Egypt	25,000	Hard	(Bulgaria) Elitsa Kostova	6–3, 6–0
Win	7–0	Feb 2015	Open Andrézieux-Bouthéon, France	25,000	Hard (i)	(Bulgaria) Elitsa Kostova	6–4, 6–4
Win	8–0	Feb 2015	ITF Moscow, Russia	25,000	Hard (i)	(Russia) Karine Sarkisova	6–0, 6–4
Win	9–0	Apr 2015	Open de Seine-et-Marne, France	50,000	Hard (i)	(France) Mathilde Johansson	6–3, 6–4
Loss	9–1	May 2015	Empire Slovak Open, Slovakia	100,000	Clay	(Montenegro) Danka Kovinić	5–7, 3–6
Loss	9–2	May 2018	Internacional Els Gorchs, Spain	25,000	Hard	(Spain) Paula Badosa	4–6, 6–3, 2–6

=== Doubles: 14 (9 titles, 5 runner-ups) ===
Legend
W100 tournaments (2–0)
W75tournaments (0–1)
W50 tournaments (1–1)
W25/35 tournaments (4–3)
W10/15 tournaments (2–0)

Result	W–L	Date	Tournament	Tier	Surface	Partner	Opponents	Score
Loss	0–1	Dec 2011	Siberia Cup, Russia	50,000	Hard (i)	(Russia) Natela Dzalamidze	(Belarus) Darya Kustova (Ukraine) Olga Savchuk	0–6, 2–6
Win	1–1	Jan 2012	ITF Kaarst, Germany	10,000	Carpet (i)	(Russia) Anna Smolina	(Russia) Alexandra Artamonova (Russia) Marina Melnikova	6–7, 6–2, [10–8]
Win	2–1	Mar 2012	ITF Moscow, Russia	25,000	Carpet (i)	(Russia) Anna Arina Marenko	(Ukraine) Valentyna Ivakhnenko (Ukraine) Kateryna Kozlova	3–6, 7–6, [10–6]
Win	3–1	Sep 2012	ITF Yoshkar-Ola, Russia	25,000	Hard (i)	(Ukraine) Veronika Kapshay	(Ukraine) Irina Buryachok (Russia) Valeria Solovyeva	6–4, 2–6, [11–9]
Loss	3–2	Jan 2013	Open Andrézieux-Bouthéon, France	25,000	Hard (i)	(Ukraine) Olga Savchuk	(Switzerland) Amra Sadiković (Croatia) Ana Vrljić	7–5, 5–7, [4–10]
Win	4–2	Feb 2013	ITF Moscow, Russia	25,000	Hard (i)	(Russia) Polina Monova	(Ukraine) Maryna Zanevska (Russia) Valeria Solovyeva	6–4, 2–6, [10–5]
Win	5–2	Jun 2013	ITF Karshi, Uzbekistan	25,000	Hard	(Belarus) Polina Pekhova	(Ukraine) Veronika Kapshay (Serbia) Teodora Mirčić	6–2, 6–1
Loss	5–3	Sep 2013	ITF Clermont-Ferrand, France	25,000	Hard (i)	(Ukraine) Alyona Sotnikova	(Netherlands) Michaëlla Krajicek (Poland) Marta Domachowska	7–5, 4–6, [8–10]
Loss	5–4	Feb 2014	Open de l'Isère, France	25,000	Hard (i)	(Ukraine) Kateryna Kozlova	(Georgia (country)) Sofia Shapatava (Ukraine) Anastasiya Vasylyeva	1–6, 4–6
Win	6–4	Mar 2014	Open de Seine-et-Marne, France	50,000	Hard (i)	(Ukraine) Lyudmyla Kichenok	(Germany) Kristina Barrois (Greece) Eleni Daniilidou	6–2, 6–4
Loss	6–5	May 2014	Empire Slovak Open, Slovakia	75,000	Clay	(Russia) Evgeniya Rodina	(Liechtenstein) Stephanie Vogt (China) Zheng Saisai	4–6, 2–6
Win	7–5	Jul 2014	President's Cup, Kazakhstan	100,000	Hard	(Russia) Vitalia Diatchenko	(Belgium) Michaela Boev (Germany) Anna-Lena Friedsam	6–4, 6–1
Win	8–5	May 2015	Empire Slovak Open	100,000	Clay	(Ukraine) Yuliya Beygelzimer	(Serbia) Aleksandra Krunić (Croatia) Petra Martić	6–3, 6–2
Win	9–5	Aug 2026	ITF Hurghada, Egypt	W15	Hard	(Egypt) Hania Abouelsaad	(France) Laïa Petretic (Luxembourg) Marie Weckerle	6–3, 3–6, [10–3]

== National representation ==
=== Team competition ===
Result	W–L	Date	Team competition	Surface	Partner/Team	Opponents	Score
Loss	0–1	Nov 2013	Fed Cup, Italy	Clay	(Russia) Alexandra Panova (Russia) Alisa Kleybanova (Russia) Irina Khromacheva	(Italy) Sara Errani (Italy) Roberta Vinci (Italy) Flavia Pennetta (Italy) Karin Knapp	0–4

=== Fed Cup/Billie Jean King Cup participation ===
This table is current through the 2019 Fed Cup

Legend
World Group (0–1)
World Group Play-off (0–2)
Zone Group (1–1)

==== Singles (0–2) ====
Edition	Round	Date	Location	Against	Surface	Opponent	W/L	Result
2016	WG PO	16 Apr 2016	Moscow (RUS)	Belarus	Clay (i)	Victoria Azarenka	L	2–6, 3–6
2016	WG PO	17 Apr 2016	Moscow (RUS)	Belarus	Clay (i)	Aliaksandra Sasnovich	L	6–4, 1–6, 5–7

==== Doubles (1–2) ====
Edition	Round	Date	Location	Against	Surface	Partner	Opponents	W/L	Result
2013	WG F	3 Nov 2013	Cagliari (ITA)	Italy	Clay	Irina Khromacheva	Karin Knapp; Flavia Pennetta	L	6–4, 2–6, [4–10]
2019	Z1 RR	6 Feb 2019	Zielona Góra (POL)	Poland	Hard (i)	Daria Kasatkina	Alicja Rosolska; Iga Świątek	L	0–6, 6–3, 3–6
2019	Z1 RR	7 Feb 2019	Zielona Góra (POL)	Denmark	Hard (i)	Anastasia Potapova	Karen Barritza; Maria Jespersen	W	6–2, 6–2

== Top 10 wins ==
Season	2018	2019	Total
Wins	1	1	2

#	Player	Rank	Event	Surface	Rd	Score	MGR
2018
1.	(Netherlands) Kiki Bertens	No. 10	Linz Open, Austria	Hard (i)	2R	7–5, 2–6, 7–6^{(3)}	No. 137
2019
2.	(Ukraine) Elina Svitolina	No. 7	Birmingham Classic, UK	Grass	1R	6–3, 3–6, 6–4	No. 62
