= Elizaveta Ianchuk =

Ukrainian tennis player

Elizaveta Ianchuk Єлізавета Янчук
- Country (sports): Ukraine
- Born: 8 March 1993 (age 32); Kyiv, Ukraine
- Plays: Right-handed (two-handed backhand)
- Prize money: $81,203

Singles
- Career record: 229–142
- Career titles: 4 ITF
- Highest ranking: No. 258 (4 April 2016)

Doubles
- Career record: 93–88
- Career titles: 6 ITF
- Highest ranking: No. 279 (22 August 2016)

Elizaveta Yuriyivna Ianchuk (Ukrainian: Єлізавета Юріївна Янчук; born 8 March 1993) is a Ukrainian former tennis player. Her younger sister Olga Ianchuk also was a professional tennis player.

== Career ==
Ianchuk has a career-high singles ranking of world No. 258, achieved on 4 April 2016. She also has a career-high doubles ranking of 279 by the WTA achieved on 22 August 2016. Ianchuk has won four singles titles and six doubles titles on tournaments of the ITF Circuit.

Ianchuk made her WTA Tour main-draw debut at the 2015 Baku Cup in the doubles event, partnering Olga Fridman.

== ITF finals ==
=== Singles: 10 (4–6) ===
Legend $25,000 tournaments $10,000 tournaments	Finals by surface Hard (1–0) Clay (3–6)

Result	No.	Date	Tournament	Surface	Opponent	Score
Win	1.	26 June 2011	ITF İzmir, Turkey	Clay	(Bulgaria) Aleksandrina Naydenova	7–5, 6–1
Loss	1.	20 August 2011	ITF Ratingen, Germany	Clay	(Germany) Scarlett Werner	0–6, 5–7
Loss	2.	1 October 2012	ITF Antalya, Turkey	Clay	(Czech Republic) Kateřina Vaňková	6–4, 4–6, 0–6
Loss	3.	16 March 2014	ITF Orlando, United States	Clay	(United States) Katerina Stewart	1–6, 1–6
Win	2.	29 June 2014	ITF Prokuplje, Serbia	Clay	(Australia) Alexandra Nancarrow	1–6, 7–5, 6–3
Win	3.	21 July 2014	ITF Palić, Serbia	Clay	(Hungary) Ágnes Bukta	6–7^{(11)}, 7–5, 6–4
Loss	4.	4 August 2014	ITF Zaječar, Serbia	Clay	(Serbia) Natalija Kostić	2–6, 1–6
Loss	5.	7 September 2014	ITF Galați, Romania	Clay	(Romania) Patricia Maria Țig	3–6, 3–6
Win	4.	22 September 2014	ITF Madrid, Spain	Hard	(France) Chloé Paquet	6–2, 6–3
Loss	6.	29 January 2017	ITF Wesley Chapel, U.S.	Clay	(Ukraine) Anhelina Kalinina	4–6, 4–6

=== Doubles: 14 (6–8) ===
Legend $25,000 tournaments $10,000 tournaments	Finals by surface Hard (0–4) Clay (6–4)

Result	No.	Date	Tournament	Surface	Partner	Opponents	Score
Win	1.	8 August 2011	Reinert Open, Germany	Clay	(Italy) Julia Mayr	(Chile) Cecilia Costa Melgar (Chile) Daniela Seguel	6–4, 6–3
Win	2.	15 AugUST 2011	ITF Ratingen, Germany	Clay	(Australia) Karolina Wlodarczak	(Germany) Katharina Hering (Germany) Dinah Pfizenmaier	3–6, 6–1, 6–4
Loss	1.	3 October 2011	ITF Yerevan, Armenia	Clay	(Ukraine) Olga Ianchuk	(Georgia (country)) Tatia Mikadze (Georgia (country)) Sofia Shapatava	1–6, 4–6
Loss	2.	30 January 2012	Rancho Santa Fe Open, United States	Hard	(Ukraine) Irina Buryachok	(United States) Maria Sanchez (United States) Yasmin Schnack	6–7^{(7)}, 6–4 [8–10]
Win	3.	1 October 2012	ITF Antalya, Turkey	Clay	(Belarus) Sviatlana Pirazhenka	(France) Anaïs Laurendon (Czech Republic) Kateřina Vaňková	7–6^{(0)}, 2–6, [10–7]
Loss	3.	4 July 2014	ITF Prokuplje, Serbia	Clay	(Ukraine) Olga Fridman	(North Macedonia) Lina Gjorcheska (Australia) Alexandra Nancarrow	4–6, 6–7^{(5)}
Win	4.	25 July 2014	Palic Open, Serbia	Clay	(North Macedonia) Lina Gjorcheska	(Romania) Irina Bara (Romania) Camelia Hristea	6–4, 6–1
Win	5.	10 August 2014	ITF Zaječar, Serbia	Clay	(Serbia) Natalija Kostić	(Australia) Alexandra Nancarrow (Czech Republic) Barbora Štefková	6–3, 7–5
Win	6.	14 September 2014	ITF Lleida, Spain	Clay	(Australia) Alexandra Nancarrow	(Spain) Yvonne Cavallé Reimers (Spain) Lucía Cervera Vázquez	6–1, 6–1
Loss	4.	9 March 2015	ITF Amiens, France	Clay	(Ukraine) Olga Ianchuk	(Hungary) Ilka Csöregi (Greece) Eleni Daniilidou	1–6, 4–6
Loss	5.	16 March 2015	ITF Gonesse, France	Clay	(Ukraine) Olga Ianchuk	(Hungary) Ágnes Bukta (Romania) Oana Georgeta Simion	4–6, 6–3, [6–10]
Loss	6.	7 September 2015	Batumi Ladies Open, Georgia	Hard	(Russia) Angelina Gabueva	(Russia) Natela Dzalamidze (Russia) Alena Tarasova	7–5, 1–6, [7–10]
Loss	7.	9 November 2015	ITF Équeurdreville, France	Hard (i)	(France) Sherazad Reix	(Romania) Alexandra Cadanțu (Netherlands) Lesley Kerkhove	3–6, 4–6
Loss	8.	19 February 2016	Morelos Open, Mexico	Hard	(Czech Republic) Kateřina Kramperová	(Bulgaria) Aleksandrina Naydenova (Hungary) Fanny Stollár	3–6, 2–6
