= Polina Monova =

Russian tennis player

Polina Monova Полина Монова
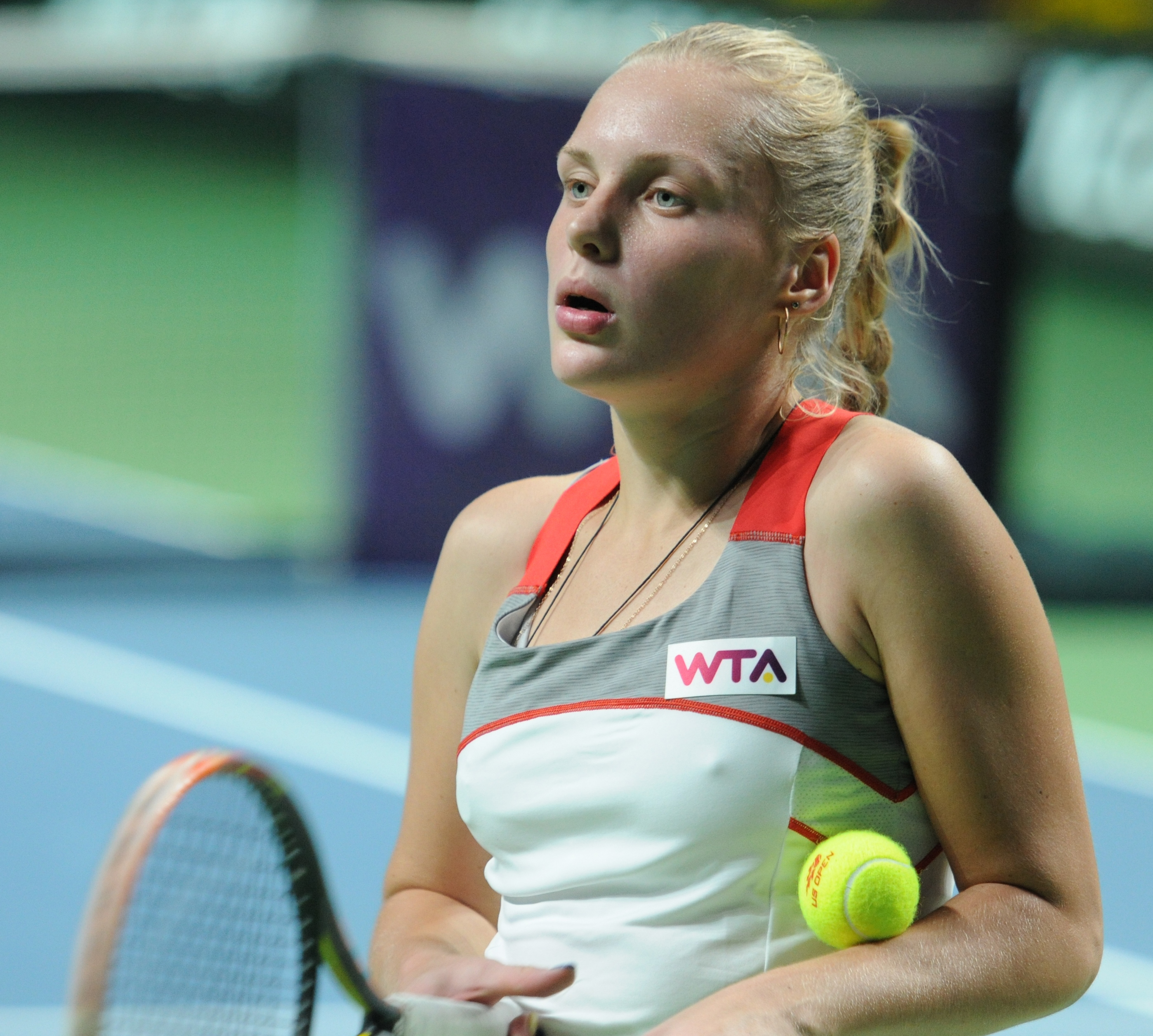
- Monova at the 2014 Kremlin Cup
- Country (sports): Russia
- Residence: Ufa, Russia
- Born: 6 April 1993 (age 33) Ufa
- Plays: Right (two-handed backhand)
- Prize money: $187,563

Singles
- Career record: 227–161
- Career titles: 9 ITF
- Highest ranking: No. 160 (19 June 2017)

Grand Slam singles results
- Australian Open: Q2 (2018)
- Wimbledon: Q2 (2017)

Doubles
- Career record: 249–117
- Career titles: 28 ITF
- Highest ranking: No. 118 (18 December 2017)

Polina Ivanovna Monova (Russian: Полина Ивановна Монова; born 6 April 1993) is a Russian former professional tennis player.

She has a career-high singles ranking of world No. 160, achieved on 19 June 2017. On 18 December 2017, she peaked at No. 118 in the doubles rankings. In her career, Monova won nine singles and 28 doubles titles on the ITF Circuit.

She made her WTA Tour main-draw debut at the 2015 Baku Cup in the doubles event, partnering Ksenia Lykina.

== ITF Circuit finals ==
=== Singles: 12 (9 titles, 3 runner-ups) ===
Legend
$25,000 tournaments
$15,000 tournaments
$10,000 tournaments

Result	No.	Date	Tournament	Surface	Opponent	Score
Win	1.	15 September 2012	ITF Astana, Kazakhstan	Hard	(Russia) Alexandra Romanova	3–6, 6–3, 6–2
Win	2.	3 May 2014	ITF Andijan, Uzbekistan	Hard	(Belarus) Sviatlana Pirazhenka	6–2, 6–2
Loss	1.	7 June 2014	Kazan Open, Russia	Clay	(Russia) Alena Tarasova	1–6, 6–7^{(3)}
Win	3.	22 May 2016	ITF Ramat Gan, Israel	Hard	(Uzbekistan) Vlada Ekshibarova	4–6, 6–1, 6–4
Win	4.	19 June 2016	Fergana Challenger, Uzbekistan	Hard	(Uzbekistan) Sabina Sharipova	6–3, 0–6, 6–4
Loss	2.	17 December 2016	ITF Pune, India	Hard	(Slovenia) Tamara Zidanšek	4–6, 2–6
Win	5.	28 January 2017	ITF Almaty, Kazakhstan	Hard (i)	(Russia) Ekaterina Kazionova	6–3, 6–3
Loss	3.	4 February 2017	ITF Almaty	Hard (i)	(Russia) Olga Doroshina	1–4 ret.
Win	6.	25 February 2017	ITF Moscow, Russia	Hard (i)	(Russia) Alina Silich	6–1, 6–1
Win	7.	19 March 2017	ITF Sharm El Sheikh, Egypt	Hard	(France) Elixane Lechemia	2–6, 7–5, 6–4
Win	8.	30 April 2017	ITF Qarshi, Uzbekistan	Hard	(Ukraine) Olga Ianchuk	4–6, 6–3, 6–3
Win	9.	10 June 2017	ITF Namangan, Uzbekistan	Hard	(Kazakhstan) Gozal Ainitdinova	1–6, 6–1, 6–2

=== Doubles: 48 (28 titles, 20 runner-ups) ===
Legend $50/60,000 tournaments $25,000 tournaments $15,000 tournaments $10,000 tournaments	Finals by surface Hard (23–11) Clay (4–9) Carpet (1–0)

Outcome	No.	Date	Tier	Tournament	Surface	Partner	Opponents	Score
Winner	1.	18 October 2010	10,000	ITF Monastir, Tunisia	Hard	(Russia) Irina Glimakova	(Belarus) Sasha Khabibulina (Serbia) Jovana Jakšić	6–2, 1–6, [10–7]
Winner	2.	20 February 2011	10,000	ITF Antalya, Turkey	Clay	(Russia) Irina Glimakova	(Romania) Patricia Chirea (Italy) Valentina Sulpizio	6–3, 6–3
Winner	3.	4 April 2011	10,000	ITF Antalya, Turkey	Hard	(Russia) Irina Glimakova	(Indonesia) Jessy Rompies (Indonesia) Grace Sari Ysidora	6–4, 6–7^{(4)}, [10–8]
Winner	4.	31 October 2011	10,000	ITF Minsk, Belarus	Carpet (i)	(Russia) Anna Smolina	(Ukraine) Olga Ianchuk (Belarus) Lidziya Marozava	6–3, 6–4
Runner-up	1.	18 June 2012	10,000	ITF Sharm El Sheikh, Egypt	Hard	(Russia) Ekaterina Yashina	(United Kingdom) Sabrina Bamburac (Serbia) Barbara Bonic	4–6, 6–7
Winner	5.	25 June 2012	10,000	ITF Sharm El Sheikh	Hard	(Russia) Ekaterina Yashina	(Kazakhstan) Kamila Kerimbayeva (Kazakhstan) Zalina Khairudinova	7–5, 4–6, [10–8]
Winner	6.	15 September 2012	10,000	ITF Astana, Kazakhstan	Hard	(Russia) Yana Sizikova	(Russia) Ulyana Ayzatulina (Russia) Elena Maltseva	6–3, 6–2
Winner	7.	18 February 2013	25,000	ITF Moscow, Russia	Hard (i)	(Russia) Margarita Gasparyan	(Ukraine) Maryna Zanevska (Russia) Valeria Solovyeva	6–4, 2–6, [10–5]
Winner	8.	11 March 2013	10,000	ITF Netanya, Israel	Hard	(Belarus) Aliaksandra Sasnovich	(China) Lu Jiajing (China) Lu Jiaxiang	6–1, 6–2
Runner-up	2.	27 April 2013	10,000	ITF Andijan, Uzbekistan	Hard	(Russia) Ekaterina Yashina	(Ukraine) Anastasiya Vasylyeva (Uzbekistan) Albina Khabibulina	5–7, 4–6
Runner-up	3.	29 April 2013	10,000	ITF Shymkent, Kazakhstan	Clay	(Russia) Anna Smolina	(Uzbekistan) Albina Khabibulina (Ukraine) Anastasiya Vasylyeva	6–2, 4–6, [9–11]
Runner-up	4.	6 May 2013	10,000	ITF Shymkent, Kazakhstan	Clay	(Russia) Anna Smolina	(Uzbekistan) Albina Khabibulina (Kyrgyzstan) Ksenia Palkina	2–6, 2–6
Winner	9.	1 June 2013	25,000	ITF Moscow, Russia	Clay	(Russia) Ksenia Kirillova	(Russia) Eugeniya Pashkova (Ukraine) Anastasiya Vasylyeva	1–6, 6–4, [10–4]
Runner-up	5.	30 June 2013	10,000	ITF Sharm El Sheikh, Egypt	Hard	(Russia) Julia Valetova	(Egypt) Mai El Kamash (South Africa) Madrie Le Roux	2–6, 6–2, [1–10]
Winner	10.	1 July 2013	10,000	ITF Sharm El Sheikh	Hard	(Russia) Julia Valetova	(Russia) Violetta Degtiareva (Ukraine) Ganna Piven	6–1, 7–5
Winner	11.	17 November 2013	10,000	ITF Astana, Kazakhstan	Hard (i)	(Russia) Alena Tarasova	(Uzbekistan) Albina Khabibulina (Kyrgyzstan) Ksenia Palkina	4–6, 6–1, [10–6]
Runner-up	6.	28 April 2014	10,000	ITF Andijan, Uzbekistan	Hard	(Russia) Yana Sizikova	(Uzbekistan) Albina Khabibulina (Russia) Veronika Kudermetova	4–6, 6–7^{(5)}
Winner	12.	3 August 2014	10,000	ITF Astana, Kazakhstan	Hard	(Russia) Ekaterina Yashina	(Belarus) Sviatlana Pirazhenka (Belarus) Polina Pekhova	6–3, 6–2
Runner-up	7.	8 September 2014	25,000	ITF Moscow, Russia	Clay	(Russia) Alexandra Artamonova	(Switzerland) Xenia Knoll (Russia) Veronika Kudermetova	6–7^{(10)}, 5–7
Runner-up	8.	15 November 2014	25,000	ITF Sharm El Sheikh, Egypt	Hard	(Russia) Valentyna Ivakhnenko	(Belgium) Marie Benoît (Netherlands) Demi Schuurs	4–6, 5–7
Winner	13.	10 April 2015	25,000	ITF Qarshi, Uzbekistan	Hard	(Russia) Valentyna Ivakhnenko	(Kazakhstan) Kamila Kerimbayeva (Russia) Ksenia Lykina	6–1, 6–3
Runner-up	9.	26 April 2015	50,000	Lale Cup, Turkey	Hard	(Russia) Valentyna Ivakhnenko	(Ukraine) Lyudmyla Kichenok (Ukraine) Nadiia Kichenok	4–6, 3–6
Winner	14.	8 June 2015	25,000	ITF Minsk, Belarus	Clay	(Russia) Valentyna Ivakhnenko	(Ukraine) Olga Ianchuk (Russia) Darya Kasatkina	4–6, 6–0, [12–10]
Runner-up	10.	28 February 2016	25,000	ITF Moscow, Russia	Hard (i)	(Russia) Yana Sizikova	(Russia) Anastasiya Komardina (Serbia) Nina Stojanović	7–6^{(5)}, 1–6, [10–12]
Runner-up	11.	6 March 2016	10,000	ITF Hammamet, Tunisia	Clay	(Russia) Yuliya Kalabina	(Austria) Julia Grabher (Bulgaria) Isabella Shinikova	5–7, 0–6
Runner-up	12.	9 April 2016	25,000	ITF Qarshi, Uzbekistan	Hard	(Russia) Ksenia Lykina	(Russia) Natela Dzalamidze (Russia) Veronika Kudermetova	6–4, 4–6, [7–10]
Runner-up	13.	6 May 2016	10,000	ITF Khimki, Russia	Hard (i)	(Russia) Yana Sizikova	(Russia) Olga Doroshina (Russia) Alena Tarasova	2–6, 4–6
Runner-up	14.	21 May 2016	10,000	ITF Ramat Gan, Israel	Clay	(Russia) Yuliya Kalabina	(Uzbekistan) Vlada Ekshibarova (Hungary) Naomi Totka	2–6, 1–6
Winner	15.	4 June 2016	25,000	ITF Namangan, Uzbekistan	Hard	(Russia) Ksenia Lykina	(Russia) Veronika Kudermetova (Slovakia) Tereza Mihalíková	3–6, 6–3, [10–5]
Winner	16.	18 June 2016	25,000	Fergana Challenger, Uzbekistan	Hard	(Russia) Yana Sizikova	(India) Prerna Bhambri (India) Ankita Raina	7–6^{(0)}, 6–2
Runner-up	15.	30 July 2016	25,000	ITF Astana, Kazakhstan	Hard	(Russia) Yana Sizikova	(Russia) Natela Dzalamidze (Russia) Veronika Kudermetova	2–6, 3–6
Runner-up	16.	2 September 2016	25,000	ITF Almaty, Kazakhstan	Clay	(Russia) Valeria Savinykh	(Russia) Valentyna Ivakhnenko (Russia) Anastasiya Komardina	5–7, 4–6
Winner	17.	14 October 2016	25,000	ITF Équeurdreville, France	Hard (i)	(Sweden) Cornelia Lister	(France) Amandine Hesse (Belgium) An-Sophie Mestach	7–5, 4–6, [10–6]
Winner	18.	3 February 2017	15,000	ITF Almaty, Kazakhstan	Hard (i)	(Russia) Olga Doroshina	(Austria) Pia König (Philippines) Katharina Lehnert	6–1, 6–2
Winner	19.	12 March 2017	15,000	ITF Sharm El Sheikh, Egypt	Hard	(Russia) Olga Doroshina	(Slovakia) Tereza Mihalíková (Bulgaria) Julia Terziyska	w/o
Winner	20.	19 March 2017	15,000	ITF Sharm El Sheikh, Egypt	Hard	(Russia) Olga Doroshina	(Russia) Yana Sizikova (Ukraine) Valeriya Strakhova	6–1, 6–1
Winner	21.	27 March 2017	60,000	Open de Seine-et-Marne, France	Hard (i)	(Belarus) Vera Lapko	(France) Manon Arcangioli (Poland) Magdalena Fręch	6–3, 6–4
Winner	22.	9 April 2017	25,000	ITF İstanbul, Turkey	Hard (i)	(Russia) Olga Doroshina	(United Kingdom) Freya Christie (United Kingdom) Laura Robson	6–3, 6–2
Runner-up	17.	15 April 2017	60,000	Lale Cup, Turkey	Hard	(Russia) Ksenia Lykina	(Russia) Veronika Kudermetova (Turkey) İpek Soylu	6–4, 5–7, [9–11]
Winner	23.	30 April 2017	25,000	ITF Qarshi, Uzbekistan	Hard	(Russia) Olga Doroshina	(Uzbekistan) Nigina Abduraimova (Montenegro) Ana Veselinović	7–5, 6–2
Winner	24.	2 June 2017	25,000	ITF Andijan, Uzbekistan	Hard	(Russia) Olga Doroshina	(Uzbekistan) Akgul Amanmuradova (Ukraine) Valeriya Strakhova	6–2, 6–0
Winner	25.	9 June 2017	25,000	ITF Namangan, Uzbekistan	Hard	(Russia) Olga Doroshina	(Uzbekistan) Nigina Abduraimova (Russia) Ksenia Lykina	6–2, 7–6^{(8)}
Winner	26.	12 August 2018	60,000	Ladies Open Hechingen, Germany	Clay	(Slovakia) Chantal Škamlová	(Kyrgyzstan) Ksenia Palkina (Georgia (country)) Sofia Shapatava	6–4, 6–3
Runner-up	18.	31 August 2018	25,000	ITF Almaty, Kazakhstan	Clay	(Russia) Yana Sizikova	(Slovakia) Tereza Mihalíková (Ukraine) Valeriya Strakhova	6–1, 2–6, [5–10]
Runner-up	19.	7 September 2018	25,000	ITF Sofia, Bulgaria	Clay	(Russia) Amina Anshba	(France) Manon Arcangioli (Belgium) Marie Benoît	4–6, 6–7^{(5)}
Winner	27.	26 October 2018	25,000	ITF İstanbul, Turkey	Hard (i)	(Russia) Ekaterina Kazionova	(Croatia) Tereza Mrdeža (Serbia) Nina Stojanović	6–3, 6–7^{(5)}, [10–6]
Runner-up	20.	9 November 2018	25,000	ITF Minsk, Belarus	Clay	(Russia) Yana Sizikova	(Belarus) Ilona Kremen (Belarus) Iryna Shymanovich	3–6, 6–7^{(3)}
Winner	28.	16 March 2019	25,000	ITF Kazan, Russia	Hard (i)	(Russia) Olga Doroshina	(United Kingdom) Freya Christie (Russia) Valeria Savinykh	6–4, 6–7^{(4)}, [11–9]
