= 2012 Baku Cup =

- Date: 23–29 July
- Edition: 2nd
- Category: WTA International
- Draw: 32S / 16D
- Surface: Hard / outdoor
- Location: Baku, Azerbaijan

Champions

Singles
- (Serbia) Bojana Jovanovski

Doubles
- (Ukraine) Irina Buryachok / (Russia) Valeria Solovieva
- Baku Cup

The 2012 Baku Cup was a professional women's tennis tournament played on hard courts. This was the second edition of the tournament, which was part of the 2012 WTA Tour. It took place in Baku, Azerbaijan between 23 July and 29 July 2012. Fifth-seeded Bojana Jovanovski won the singles title.

== Finals ==
=== Singles ===
- (Serbia) Bojana Jovanovski defeated (United States) Julia Cohen, 6–3, 6–1

=== Doubles ===
- (Ukraine) Irina Buryachok / (Russia) Valeria Solovieva defeated (Czech Republic) Eva Birnerová / (Italy) Alberta Brianti, 6–3, 6–2

== Singles main-draw entrants ==
=== Seeds ===
Country	Player	Rank^{1}	Seed
KAZ	Ksenia Pervak	58	1
RUS	Alexandra Panova	75	2
LUX	Mandy Minella	78	3
CZE	Andrea Hlaváčková	88	4
SRB	Bojana Jovanovski	95	5
RUS	Nina Bratchikova	99	6
UZB	Akgul Amanmuradova	101	7
CZE	Eva Birnerová	108	8

- ^{1} Rankings are as of July 16, 2012

=== Other entrants ===
The following players received wildcards into the singles main draw:

- (Azerbaijan) Kamilla Farhad
- (Russia) Varvara Flink
- (Georgia (country)) Ekaterine Gorgodze

The following players received entry from the qualifying draw:

- (Australia) Sacha Jones
- (Serbia) Aleksandra Krunić
- (Russia) Valeria Solovieva
- (China) Wang Qiang

=== Withdrawals ===
- (Hungary) Tímea Babos
- (Ukraine) Kateryna Bondarenko
- (France) Alizé Cornet
- (Belarus) Olga Govortsova (viral illness)
- (Georgia (country)) Anna Tatishvili

=== Retirements ===
- (Spain) Estrella Cabeza Candela (abdominal strain)
- (Thailand) Noppawan Lertcheewakarn (right elbow injury)
- (Kazakhstan) Ksenia Pervak (heat illness)

== Doubles main-draw entrants ==
=== Seeds ===
Country	Player	Country	Player	Rank^{1}	Seed
RUS	Nina Bratchikova	RUS	Alexandra Panova	136	1
RUS	Alla Kudryavtseva	THA	Tamarine Tanasugarn	155	2
CZE	Eva Birnerová	ITA	Alberta Brianti	157	3
UKR	Irina Buryachok	RUS	Valeria Solovieva	396	4

- ^{1} Rankings are as of July 16, 2012

=== Other entrants ===
The following pairs received wildcards into the doubles main draw:

- (Azerbaijan) Kamilla Farhad / (Ukraine) Oleksandra Korashvili
- (Russia) Varvara Flink / (Austria) Patricia Mayr-Achleitner

=== Retirements ===
- (Spain) Estrella Cabeza Candela (abdominal strain)
- (Thailand) Noppawan Lertcheewakarn (right elbow injury)
