= 2015 Baku Cup =

- Date: 27 July – 2 August
- Edition: 5th
- Category: WTA International
- Draw: 32S / 16D
- Prize money: $250,000
- Surface: Hard / outdoor
- Location: Baku, Azerbaijan

Champions

Singles
- (Russia) Margarita Gasparyan

Doubles
- (Russia) Margarita Gasparyan / (Russia) Alexandra Panova
- Baku Cup

The 2015 Baku Cup was a professional women's tennis tournament played on hard courts. This was the fifth and last edition of the tournament, and part of the 2015 WTA Tour. It took place in Baku, Azerbaijan between 27 July and 2 August 2015. Unseeded Margarita Gasparyan won the singles title.

== Finals ==
=== Singles ===
(Russia) Margarita Gasparyan defeated (Romania) Patricia Maria Țig, 6–3, 5–7, 6–0

- It was Gasparyan's only singles title of the year and the 1st of her career.

=== Doubles ===
(Russia) Margarita Gasparyan / (Russia) Alexandra Panova defeated (Russia) Vitalia Diatchenko / (Ukraine) Olga Savchuk, 6–3, 7–5

== Points and prize money ==
=== Point distribution ===
Event	W	F	SF	QF	Round of 16	Round of 32	Q	Q2	Q1
Singles	280	180	110	60	30	1	18	12	1
Doubles	280	180	110	60	1	—N/a	—N/a	—N/a	—N/a

=== Prize money ===
Event	W	F	SF	QF	Round of 16	Round of 32	Q2	Q1
Singles	$43,000	$21,400	$11,500	$6,175	$3,400	$2,100	$1,020	$600
Doubles	$12,300	$6,400	$3,435	$1,820	$960	—N/a	—N/a	—N/a

== Singles main-draw entrants ==
=== Seeds ===
Country	Player	Rank^{1}	Seed
RUS	Anastasia Pavlyuchenkova	41	1
ITA	Karin Knapp	43	2
SVK	Dominika Cibulková	56	3
JPN	Kurumi Nara	60	4
SRB	Bojana Jovanovski	67	5
~~UKR~~	~~Lesia Tsurenko~~	~~71~~	~~6~~
RUS	Vitalia Diatchenko	74	7
ITA	Francesca Schiavone	85	8
MNE	Danka Kovinić	86	9

- ^{1} Rankings are as of July 20, 2015

=== Other entrants ===
The following players received wildcards into the singles main draw:

- (Ukraine) Oleksandra Korashvili
- (Poland) Magda Linette
- (Azerbaijan) Zuleykha Šafářová

The following players received entry from the qualifying draw:

- (Uzbekistan) Nigina Abduraimova
- (Ukraine) Olga Ianchuk
- (Russia) Valentyna Ivakhnenko
- (Ukraine) Olga Savchuk
- (Romania) Patricia Maria Țig
- (China) Yang Zhaoxuan

The following player received entry as a lucky loser:

- (Ukraine) Yuliya Beygelzimer

=== Withdrawals ===
Before the tournament

- (Czech Republic) Denisa Allertová → replaced by (Ukraine) Kateryna Bondarenko
- (Czech Republic) Klára Koukalová → replaced by (Croatia) Donna Vekić
- (Romania) Andreea Mitu → replaced by (Russia) Alexandra Panova
- (Romania) Monica Niculescu → replaced by (Czech Republic) Barbora Krejčíková
- (Kazakhstan) Yaroslava Shvedova → replaced by (Russia) Margarita Gasparyan
- (Czech Republic) Kateřina Siniaková → replaced by (Russia) Elizaveta Kulichkova
- (Czech Republic) Tereza Smitková → replaced by (Turkey) Çağla Büyükakçay
- (Ukraine) Lesia Tsurenko (right wrist injury) → replaced by (Ukraine) Yuliya Beygelzimer
- (Italy) Roberta Vinci → replaced by (Japan) Misa Eguchi
- (Belgium) Yanina Wickmayer → replaced by (China) Zhu Lin

=== Retirements ===
- (Ukraine) Yuliya Beygelzimer (neck injury)
- (Ukraine) Kateryna Bondarenko (right lower leg injury)
- (Montenegro) Danka Kovinić (gastrointestinal illness)

== Doubles main-draw entrants ==
=== Seeds ===
Country	Player	Country	Player	Rank^{1}	Seed
RUS	Margarita Gasparyan	RUS	Alexandra Panova	132	1
RUS	Vitalia Diatchenko	UKR	Olga Savchuk	162	2
JPN	Hiroko Kuwata	NED	Demi Schuurs	201	3
GEO	Oksana Kalashnikova	MNE	Danka Kovinić	226	4

- ^{1} Rankings are as of July 20, 2015

=== Other entrants ===
The following pair received a wildcard into the doubles main draw:

- (Azerbaijan) Amina Dik / (Azerbaijan) Zuleykha Šafářová
