= Kateřina Vaňková =

Czech tennis player

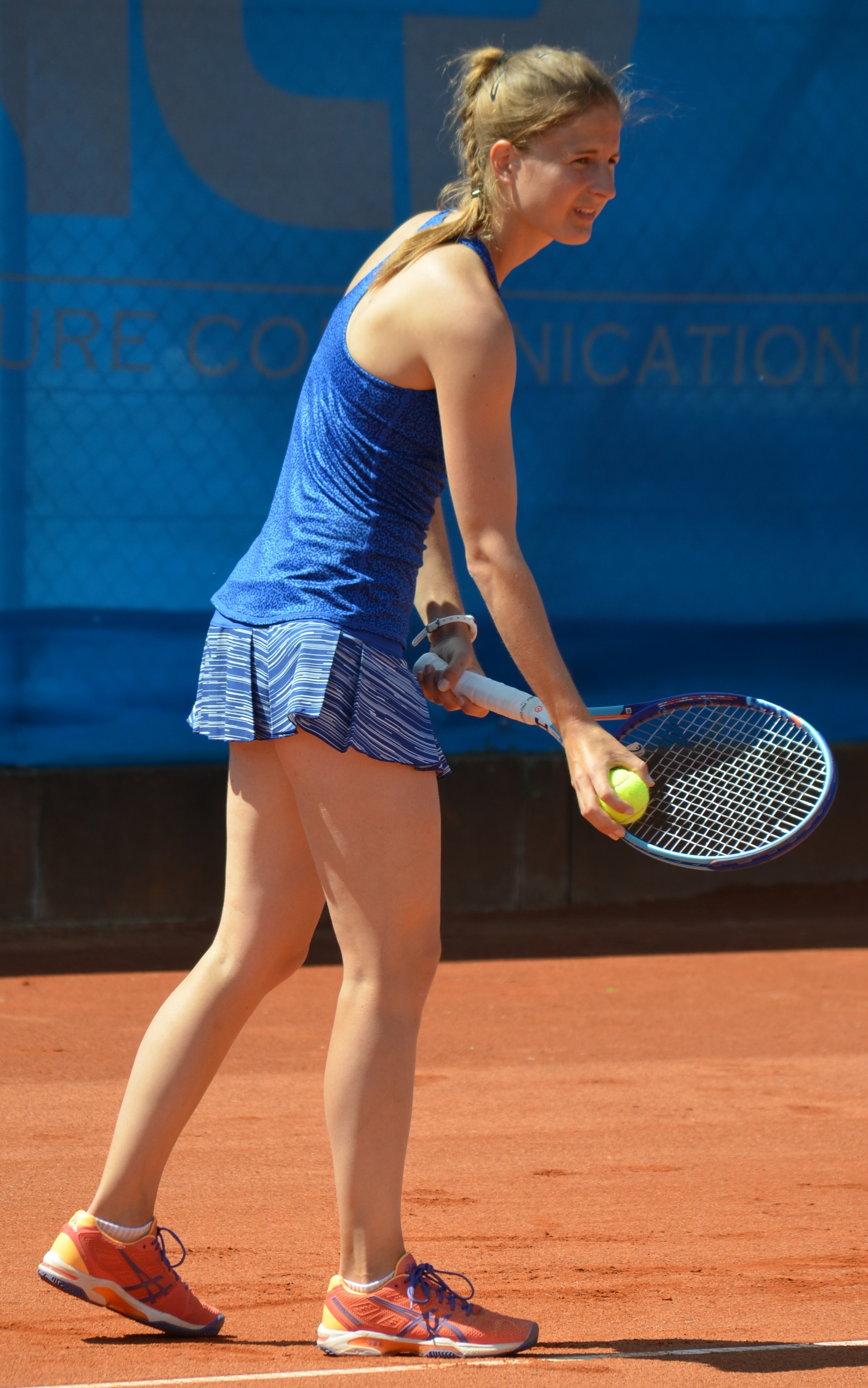
- Vaňková at the 2015 Nürnberger Versicherungscup
- Country (sports): Czech Republic
- Born: 30 December 1989 (age 35); Prague, Czechoslovakia
- Plays: Left-handed (two-handed backhand)
- Prize money: US$ 149,829

Singles
- Career record: 348–211
- Career titles: 15 ITF
- Highest ranking: No. 218 (20 April 2015)

Grand Slam singles results
- US Open: Q2 (2014)

Doubles
- Career record: 122–74
- Career titles: 14 ITF
- Highest ranking: No. 192 (18 April 2016)
Medal record
Representing Czech Republic
Summer Universiade
| Bronze medal – third place | 2013 Kazan | Women's singles |

Kateřina Vaňková (born 30 December 1989) is a Czech former professional tennis player.

She has won 15 singles and 14 doubles titles on the ITF Women's Circuit. On 20 April 2015, she reached her best singles ranking of world No. 218. On 18 April 2016, she peaked at No. 192 in the WTA doubles rankings.

Vaňková made her WTA Tour debut at the 2015 Prague Open, partnering Markéta Vondroušová in the doubles draw. The pair lost their first-round match against Kateryna Bondarenko and Eva Hrdinová.

== ITF Circuit finals ==
=== Singles: 27 (15 titles, 12 runner-ups) ===
| Legend $25,000 tournaments $15,000 tournaments $10,000 tournaments | Finals by surface Hard (2–5) Clay (12–7) Carpet (1–0) |

| Result | No. | Date | Tournament | Surface | Opponent | Score |
|---|---|---|---|---|---|---|
| Win | 1. | Jun 2006 | ITF Staré Splavy, Czech Republic | Clay | (Czech Republic) Zuzana Zálabská | 6–4, 6–4 |
| Loss | 1. | Aug 2006 | ITF Kędzierzyn-Koźle, Poland | Clay | (Germany) Anne Schäfer | 6–7^{(2)}, 5–7 |
| Win | 2. | Oct 2006 | ITF Granada, Spain | Hard | (Spain) Teresa Ferrer-López Cuervo | 6–0, 7–6^{(9)} |
| Loss | 2. | Apr 2007 | GB Pro-Series Bath, UK | Hard (i) | (France) Claire Feuerstein | 3–6, 3–6 |
| Win | 3. | Aug 2007 | ITF Wahlstedt, Germany | Clay | (Serbia) Neda Kozić | 6–1, 6–4 |
| Win | 4. | Sep 2007 | ITF Kędzierzyn-Koźle, Poland | Clay | (Poland) Olga Brózda | 3–6, 6–4, 7–6^{(7)} |
| Win | 5. | Oct 2007 | ITF Porto, Portugal | Clay | (Portugal) Catarina Ferreira | 6–3, 6–2 |
| Loss | 3. | Oct 2008 | ITF Porto | Clay | (Belgium) Appollonia Melzani | 3–6, 1–6 |
| Win | 6. | Oct 2008 | ITF Espinho, Portugal | Clay | (Morocco) Fatima El Allami | 6–2, 6–3 |
| Loss | 4. | Jul 2009 | ITF Piešťany, Slovakia | Clay | (Czech Republic) Darina Šeděnková | 4–6, 3–6 |
| Loss | 5. | Jul 2011 | ITF Bad Waltersdorf, Austria | Clay | (Russia) Victoria Kan | 6–7^{(3)}, 1–6 |
| Loss | 6. | Aug 2011 | ITF Vienna, Austria | Clay | (Belarus) Ilona Kremen | 1–6, 1–6 |
| Win | 7. | Sep 2011 | ITF Trimbach, Switzerland | Clay | (Germany) Christina Shakovets | 6–3, 6–2 |
| Loss | 7. | May 2012 | ITF Bad Saarow, Germany | Clay | (Slovakia) Anna Karolína Schmiedlová | 1–6, 3–6 |
| Win | 8. | Aug 2012 | ITF Piešťany, Slovakia | Clay | (Czech Republic) Kateřina Kramperová | 3–6, 6–3, 6–2 |
| Win | 9. | Aug 2012 | ITF Innsbruck, Austria | Clay | (Germany) Lena-Marie Hofmann | 6–1, 4–6, 6–4 |
| Win | 10. | Sep 2012 | ITF Caslano, Switzerland | Clay | (Russia) Daria Salnikova | 6–3, 6–4 |
| Win | 11. | Sep 2012 | ITF Engis, Belgium | Clay | (Netherlands) Cindy Burger | 6–2, 6–4 |
| Win | 12. | Oct 2012 | ITF Antalya, Turkey | Clay | (Ukraine) Elizaveta Ianchuk | 4–6, 6–4, 6–0 |
| Loss | 8. | Mar 2013 | ITF Gonesse, France | Clay (i) | (Germany) Anne Schäfer | 1–6, 1–2 ret. |
| Loss | 9. | Aug 2013 | ITF Westende, Belgium | Hard | (Czech Republic) Kateřina Siniaková | 1–6, 3–6 |
| Loss | 10. | Dec 2013 | ITF Vendryně, Czech Republic | Hard (i) | (Russia) Ekaterina Alexandrova | 7–5, 6–7^{(0)}, 1–6 |
| Loss | 11. | Feb 2014 | ITF Stockholm, Sweden | Hard (i) | (Ukraine) Olga Ianchuk | 0–6, 0–6 |
| Win | 13. | May 2014 | ITF Seoul, South Korea | Hard | (South Korea) Lee So-ra | 5–7, 7–5, 7–5 |
| Loss | 12. | Oct 2014 | ITF Antalya, Turkey | Hard | (France) Sherazad Reix | 4–6, 4–6 |
| Win | 14. | Jan 2015 | ITF Kaarst, Germany | Carpet (i) | (Germany) Tamara Korpatsch | 2–6, 6–4, 6–4 |
| Win | 15. | Aug 2016 | ITF Graz, Austria | Clay | (Austria) Nicole Rottmann | 6–1, 6–2 |

=== Doubles: 23 (14 titles, 9 runner-ups) ===
| Legend $50,000 tournaments $25,000 tournaments $15,000 tournaments $10,000 tournaments | Finals by surface Hard (4–2) Clay (9–7) Grass (0–0) Carpet (1–0) |

| Result | No. | Date | Tier | Tournament | Surface | Partner | Opponents | Score |
|---|---|---|---|---|---|---|---|---|
| Win | 1. | Nov 2005 | 10,000 | ITF Sunderland, UK | Hard (i) | (United Kingdom) Sarah Coles | (United Kingdom) Melissa Berry (United Kingdom) Lindsay Cox | 2–6, 6–1, 6–4 |
| Win | 2. | Apr 2007 | 10,000 | GB Pro-Series Bath, UK | Hard (i) | (Slovakia) Martina Babáková | (United Kingdom) Rebecca Fong (United States) Susanna Lingman | 6–4, 6–4 |
| Win | 3. | Dec 2007 | 25,000 | ITF Přerov, Czech Republic | Hard (i) | (Czech Republic) Veronika Chvojková | (Czech Republic) Gabriela Navrátilová (Czech Republic) Michaela Paštiková | 3–6, 6–4, [12–10] |
| Win | 4. | Oct 2008 | 10,000 | ITF Porto, Portugal | Clay | (Czech Republic) Jana Jandová | (Netherlands) Michelle Gerards (Russia) Marina Melnikova | 6–3, 4–6, [10–6] |
| Loss | 1. | Dec 2008 | 25,000 | ITF Přerov, Czech Republic | Hard (i) | (Russia) Ksenia Lykina | (Czech Republic) Tereza Hladíková (Czech Republic) Renata Voráčová | 0–6, 6–3, [3–10] |
| Loss | 2. | Mar 2009 | 10,000 | GB Pro-Series Bath, UK | Hard (i) | (Czech Republic) Veronika Chvojková | (Switzerland) Stefania Boffa (United Kingdom) Anna Fitzpatrick | 1–6, 1–6 |
| Win | 5. | Jul 2009 | 10,000 | ITF Brussels, Belgium | Clay | (Czech Republic) Simona Dobrá | (Russia) Vasilisa Davydova (Russia) Elina Gasanova | 6–3, 6–4 |
| Win | 6. | Oct 2009 | 10,000 | ITF Antalya, Turkey | Clay | (Romania) Mihaela Buzărnescu | (Morocco) Fatima El Allami (Portugal) Magali de Lattre | 6–1, 6–1 |
| Win | 7. | Oct 2009 | 10,000 | ITF Antalya | Clay | (Belarus) Anna Orlik | (Ukraine) Sofiya Kovalets (Ukraine) Kateryna Kozlova | 6–3, 6–0 |
| Win | 8. | Jul 2011 | 10,000 | ITF Bad Waltersdorf, Austria | Clay | (Bosnia and Herzegovina) Sandra Martinović | (Austria) Pia König (Austria) Yvonne Neuwirth | 6–3, 3–6, [10–8] |
| Win | 9. | Sep 2012 | 10,000 | ITF Antalya, Turkey | Clay | (France) Anaïs Laurendon | (Romania) Diana Buzean (Romania) Bianca Hîncu | 7–5, 6–3 |
| Loss | 3. | Oct 2012 | 10,000 | ITF Antalya | Clay | (France) Anaïs Laurendon | (Ukraine) Elizaveta Ianchuk (Belarus) Sviatlana Pirazhenka | 6–7^{(0)}, 6–2, [7–10] |
| Win | 10. | Oct 2012 | 10,000 | ITF Antalya | Clay | (France) Anaïs Laurendon | (Ukraine) Alona Fomina (North Macedonia) Lina Gjorcheska | 6–2, 6–4 |
| Win | 11. | Nov 2012 | 15,000 | ITF Vendryně, Czech Republic | Hard (i) | (Czech Republic) Jesika Malečková | (Czech Republic) Martina Kubičíková (Czech Republic) Tereza Smitková | 7–6^{(2)}, 6–2 |
| Loss | 4. | Mar 2013 | 10,000 | ITF Gonesse, France | Clay (i) | (Germany) Anne Schäfer | (Netherlands) Cindy Burger (Chile) Daniela Seguel | 7–6^{(6)}, 3–6, [2–10] |
| Loss | 5. | Sep 2013 | 25,000 | Royal Cup, Montenegro | Clay | (Slovenia) Maša Zec Peškirič | (Montenegro) Vladica Babić (Croatia) Iva Mekovec | 6–4, 6–7^{(1)}, [5–10] |
| Loss | 6. | May 2015 | 25,000 | Maribor Open, Slovenia | Clay | (Czech Republic) Petra Krejsová | (Georgia (country)) Ekaterine Gorgodze (Slovenia) Nastja Kolar | 2–6, 4–6 |
| Loss | 7. | Jul 2015 | 50,000 | ITS Cup, Czech Republic | Clay | (Netherlands) Cindy Burger | (Czech Republic) Lenka Kunčíková (Czech Republic) Karolína Stuchlá | 6–1, 4–6, [10–12] |
| Win | 12. | Jul 2017 | 15,000 | ITF Prokuplje, Serbia | Clay | (United States) Natalie Suk | (Russia) Daria Lodikova (Bulgaria) Ani Vangelova | 6–0, 6–1 |
| Loss | 8. | Jul 2017 | 15,000 | ITF Prokuplje | Clay | (United States) Natalie Suk | (Ukraine) Maryna Chernyshova (Russia) Daria Lodikova | 6–3, 4–6, [4–10] |
| Win | 13. | Nov 2017 | 25,000 | ITF Zawada, Poland | Carpet (i) | (Croatia) Tena Lukas | (Poland) Weronika Jasmina Foryś (Belarus) Nika Shytkouskaya | 6–4, 3–6, [10–4] |
| Loss | 9. | Apr 2018 | 15,000 | ITF Antalya, Turkey | Clay | (Russia) Kamilla Rakhimova | (Japan) Haruna Arakawa (Italy) Federica Bilardo | 6–4, 4–6, [8–10] |
| Win | 14. | Apr 2018 | 15,000 | ITF Antalya | Clay | (Belarus) Ilona Kremen | (Czech Republic) Magdaléna Pantůčková (Belgium) Eliessa Vanlangendonck | 7–5, 6–0 |
