= Baku Cup =

Defunct tennis tournament
- Founded: 2011
- Abolished: 2015
- Location: Baku; Azerbaijan
- Venue: Baku Tennis Academy
- Category: International
- Surface: Hardcourt / outdoor
- Draw: 32S / 32SQ / 16D
- Prize money: US$ 250,000
- Website: bakucup.az

The Baku Cup was a professional women's tennis tournament held in Baku, Azerbaijan. It made its debut on the 2011 WTA Tour and as one of the international tier of events. This WTA Tour event is an international tournament and was played at the Baku Tennis Academy on outdoor hardcourts. The 2015 Baku Cup was the last edition.

== History ==
Baku Cup is the first WTA event to be held in the city. It became the first professional tennis tournament hosted by the country, with the inaugural event beginning on 18 July 2011. The event offered $220,000 in prize money and was played on outdoor hard courts with a field of 32 singles players and 16 doubles teams.

== Results ==
=== Singles ===
Year	Champion	Runner-up	Score
2011	(Russia) Vera Zvonareva	(Russia) Ksenia Pervak	6–1, 6–4
2012	(Serbia) Bojana Jovanovski	(United States) Julia Cohen	6–3, 6–1
2013	(Ukraine) Elina Svitolina	(Israel) Shahar Pe'er	6–4, 6–4
2014	(Ukraine) Elina Svitolina (2)	(Serbia) Bojana Jovanovski	6–1, 7–6^{(7–2)}
2015	(Russia) Margarita Gasparyan	(Romania) Patricia Maria Țig	6–3, 5–7, 6–0

=== Doubles ===
Year	Champions	Runners-up	Score
2011	(Ukraine) Mariya Koryttseva (Belarus) Tatiana Poutchek	(Romania) Monica Niculescu (Kazakhstan) Galina Voskoboeva	6–3, 2–6, [10–8]
2012	(Ukraine) Irina Buryachok (Russia) Valeria Solovyeva	(Czech Republic) Eva Birnerová (Italy) Alberta Brianti	6–3, 6–2
2013	(Ukraine) Irina Buryachok (2) (Georgia (country)) Oksana Kalashnikova	(Greece) Eleni Daniilidou (Serbia) Aleksandra Krunić	4–6, 7–6^{(7–3)}, [10–4]
2014	(Russia) Alexandra Panova (United Kingdom) Heather Watson	(Romania) Raluca Olaru (Israel) Shahar Pe'er	6–2, 7–6^{(7–3)}
2015	(Russia) Margarita Gasparyan (Russia) Alexandra Panova (2)	(Russia) Vitalia Diatchenko (Ukraine) Olga Savchuk	6–3, 7–5
