= Olga Ianchuk =

Ukrainian tennis player

Olga Ianchuk Ольга Янчук
- Country (sports): Ukraine
- Born: 29 March 1995 (age 31) Kyiv, Ukraine
- Turned pro: 2011
- Plays: Right-handed (two-handed backhand)
- Prize money: $141,054

Singles
- Career record: 256–192
- Career titles: 11 ITF
- Highest ranking: No. 213 (14 August 2017)

Doubles
- Career record: 117–125
- Career titles: 4 ITF
- Highest ranking: No. 254 (19 October 2015)

Olga Yuriyivna Ianchuk (Ukrainian: Ольга Юріївна Янчук, born 29 March 1995) is a Ukrainian former professional tennis player. Her older sister Elizaveta Ianchuk also was a professional tennis player.

== Career ==
Ianchuk has career-high WTA rankings of 213 in singles, achieved in August 2017, and 254 in doubles, reached in October 2015. In her career, she won eleven singles titles and four doubles titles on tournaments of the ITF Circuit.

Ianchuk made her WTA Tour main-draw debut at the 2015 Baku Cup in the doubles event, partnering Oleksandra Korashvili.

== ITF Circuit finals ==
=== Singles: 17 (11 titles, 6 runner-ups) ===
Legend $25,000 tournaments $15,000 tournaments $10,000 tournaments	Finals by surface Hard (3–3) Clay (7–3) Carpet (1–0)

Result	No.	Date	Tournament	Surface	Opponent	Score
Win	1.	Oct 2011	ITF Minsk, Belarus	Carpet	(Russia) Julia Valetova	6–3, 4–6, 6–4
Win	2.	Oct 2012	ITF Antalya, Turkey	Clay	(Netherlands) Demi Schuurs	6–2, 2–6, 6–3
Win	3.	Oct 2012	ITF Antalya	Clay	(Romania) Diana Buzean	3–6, 6–4, 6–4
Win	4.	May 2013	ITF Antalya	Hard	(Slovakia) Zuzana Zlochová	6–3, 6–3
Win	5.	May 2013	ITF Antalya	Hard	(Czech Republic) Martina Kubiciková	6–3, 7–6^{(4)}
Win	6.	Feb 2014	ITF Stockholm, Sweden	Hard (i)	(Czech Republic) Kateřina Vaňková	6–0, 6–0
Loss	1.	Jun 2014	ITF Bol, Croatia	Clay	(Argentina) Nadia Podoroska	3–6, 6–2, 2–6
Loss	2.	Sep 2014	Batumi Ladies Open, Georgia	Hard	(Belgium) An-Sophie Mestach	2–6, 0–6
Loss	3.	Dec 2014	ITF İstanbul, Turkey	Hard (i)	(Croatia) Jana Fett	2–6, 4–6
Win	7.	Mar 2015	ITF Amiens, France	Clay (i)	(France) Alizé Lim	3–6, 6–3, 6–4
Win	8.	Mar 2015	ITF Gonesse, France	Clay (i)	(Slovakia) Michaela Hončová	3–6, 7–5, 6–3
Win	9.	Mar 2017	ITF Heraklion, Greece	Clay	(Czech Republic) Miriam Kolodziejová	6–3, 6–2
Loss	4.	Apr 2017	ITF Qarshi, Uzbekistan	Hard	(Russia) Polina Monova	6–4, 3–6, 3–6
Loss	5.	Jun 2017	ITF Warsaw, Poland	Clay	(Italy) Martina Trevisan	2–6, 4–6
Win	10.	Jul 2017	ITF Moscow, Russia	Clay	(Ukraine) Valentyna Ivakhnenko	4–6, 6–0, 7–6^{(5)}
Loss	6.	Sep 2017	ITF Kyiv, Ukraine	Clay	(Belarus) Sviatlana Pirazhenka	4–6, 4–6
Win	11.	Aug 2018	ITF Warsaw, Poland	Clay	(Argentina) Victoria Bosio	6–3, 4–6, 6–3

=== Doubles: 21 (4 titles, 17 runner-ups) ===
Legend $50,000 tournaments $25,000 tournaments $15,000 tournaments $10,000 tournaments	Finals by surface Hard (2–2) Clay (1–14) Carpet (1–1)

Outcome	No.	Date	Tournament	Surface	Partner	Opponents	Score
Runner-up	1.	3 October 2011	ITF Yerevan, Armenia	Clay	(Ukraine) Elizaveta Ianchuk	(Georgia (country)) Tatia Mikadze (Georgia (country)) Sofia Shapatava	1–6, 4–6
Runner-up	2.	31 October 2011	ITF Minsk, Belarus	Carpet (i)	(Belarus) Lidziya Marozava	(Russia) Polina Monova (Russia) Anna Smolina	3–6, 4–6
Winner	1.	13 May 2013	ITF Antalya, Turkey	Hard	(Belarus) Darya Lebesheva	(Japan) Nozomi Fujioka (Japan) Hirono Watanabe	3–6, 7–5, [10–8]
Winner	2.	27 May 2013	ITF Adana, Turkey	Hard	(Slovakia) Zuzana Zlochová	(Turkey) Sultan Gonen (Bulgaria) Julia Stamatova	6–2, 7–5
Runner-up	3.	29 July 2013	ITF Rovereto, Italy	Clay	(Slovakia) Chantal Škamlová	(Italy) Martina Caregaro (Italy) Anna Floris	6–3, 4–6, [6–10]
Runner-up	4.	12 October 2013	ITF Moscow, Russia	Clay	(Estonia) Anett Kontaveit	(Ukraine) Anna Shkudun (Ukraine) Alyona Sotnikova	3–6, 4–6
Winner	3.	20 January 2014	ITF Kaarst, Germany	Carpet	(Slovenia) Nastja Kolar	(Germany) Vivian Heisen (Germany) Linda Prenkovic	7–5, 6–3
Runner-up	5.	17 February 2014	ITF Helsingborg, Sweden	Hard	(Bosnia and Herzegovina) Jasmina Tinjic	(Sweden) Cornelia Lister (Netherlands) Lisanne van Riet	4–6, 3–6
Winner	4.	12 May 2014	ITF Bastad, Sweden	Clay	(Germany) Carolin Daniels	(Russia) Anna Smolina (Russia) Liubov Vasilyeva	6–4, 6–3
Runner-up	6.	19 May 2014	ITF Bol, Croatia	Clay	(Germany) Christina Shakovets	(Finland) Emma Laine (Russia) Eugeniya Pashkova	4–6, 0–6
Runner-up	7.	2 June 2014	ITF Bol, Croatia	Clay	(Germany) Christina Shakovets	(Czech Republic) Lenka Kunčíková (Czech Republic) Karolína Stuchlá	6–0, 1–6, [8–10]
Runner-up	8.	8 November 2014	ITF Sharm El Sheikh, Egypt	Hard	(Slovenia) Nastja Kolar	(Germany) Antonia Lottner (Germany) Laura Siegemund	1–6, 1–6
Runner-up	9.	15 March 2015	ITF Amiens, France	Clay (i)	(Ukraine) Elizaveta Ianchuk	(Hungary) Ilka Csoregi (Greece) Eleni Daniilidou	1–6, 4–6
Runner-up	10.	22 March 2015	ITF Gonesse, France	Clay (i)	(Ukraine) Elizaveta Ianchuk	(Hungary) Ágnes Bukta (Romania) Oana Georgeta Simion	4–6, 6–3, [6–10]
Runner-up	11.	3 May 2015	ITF Charlottesville, U.S.	Clay	(Russia) Irina Khromacheva	(Canada) Françoise Abanda (United States) Maria Sanchez	1–6, 3–6
Runner-up	12.	31 May 2015	ITF Moscow, Russia	Clay	(Russia) Daria Kasatkina	(Germany) Carolin Daniels (Ukraine) Alyona Sotnikova	2–6, 6–7^{(10)}
Runner-up	13.	13 June 2015	ITF Minsk, Belarus	Clay	(Russia) Daria Kasatkina	(Russia) Valentyna Ivakhnenko (Russia) Polina Monova	6–4, 0–6, [10–12]
Runner-up	14.	18 September 2015	ITF Bucha, Ukraine	Clay	(Russia) Victoria Kan	(Ukraine) Alona Fomina (Ukraine) Oleksandra Korashvili	4–6, 3–6
Runner-up	15.	25 September 2015	ITF Bucha, Ukraine	Clay	(Ukraine) Anastasiya Vasylyeva	(Georgia (country)) Ekaterine Gorgodze (Georgia (country)) Sofia Shapatava	5–7, 2–6
Runner-up	16.	20 August 2016	ITF Leipzig, Germany	Clay	(Slovakia) Michaela Hončová	(Germany) Nicola Geuer (Germany) Anna Klasen	6–7^{(4)}, 5–7
Runner-up	17.	25 March 2017	ITF Heraklion, Greece	Clay	(Greece) Despina Papamichail	(Austria) Mira Antonitsch (India) Karman Thandi	0–6, 3–6
