= 2010 Fed Cup Europe/Africa Zone Group III – play-offs =

The play-offs of the 2010 Fed Cup Europe/Africa Zone Group III were the final stages of the Group III Zonal Competition, a women's tennis tournament, involving teams from Europe and Africa. Using the positions determined in their pools, the seven teams faced off to determine their placing in the 2010 Fed Cup Europe/Africa Zone Group III. The top two teams advanced to Group II for next year.

Placing	Pool A	Pool B
1	Turkey	Morocco
2	Egypt	Algeria
3	Moldova	Ireland
4		Malta

== Promotion play-offs ==
The top two teams of each pool were placed against each other in two head-to-head rounds. The winner of the rounds advanced to Group II for next year.

=== Turkey vs. Algeria ===
Turkey
3
Smash Tennis Academy, Cairo, Egypt
24 April 2010
Clay (outdoors)

Algeria
0

			1	2	3
1	(Turkey) (Algeria)	Pemra Özgen; Assia Halo	6; 0	6; 2
2	(Turkey) (Algeria)	Çağla Büyükakçay; Fatima Zorah Bouabdallah	6; 1	6; 1
3	(Turkey) (Algeria)	Pemra Özgen / İpek Şenoğlu; Nihel Adjali / Fatima Zohra Boukezzi	6; 1	6; 0

=== Egypt vs. Morocco ===
Egypt
0
Smash Tennis Academy, Cairo, Egypt
24 April 2010
Clay (outdoors)

Morocco
2

			1	2	3
1	(Egypt) (Morocco)	Magy Aziz; Nadia Lalami	3; 6	3; 6
2	(Egypt) (Morocco)	Ola Abou Zekry; Fatima El Allami	2; 6	2; 6
3	(Egypt) (Morocco)					not played

== Fifth to Sixth play-off ==
The third placed teams of both pools were placed against each other in a head-to-head rounds. The winner of the round was allocated fifth place in the Group, while the loser was allocated sixth.

=== Moldova vs. Ireland ===
Moldova
1
Smash Tennis Academy, Cairo, Egypt
24 April 2010
Clay (outdoors)

Ireland
2

			1	2	3
1	(Moldova) (Republic of Ireland)	Olga Terteac; Niamh Coveney	6; 2	6; 0
2	(Moldova) (Republic of Ireland)	Julia Helbet; Julia Moriarty	2; 6	1; 6
3	(Moldova) (Republic of Ireland)	Julia Helbet / Alexandra Perper; Lynsey McCullough / Julia Moriarty	6^{4} 7^{7}	6; 4	6^{3} 7^{7}

== Seventh ==
Due to the fact that there was an odd number of teams in Pool A as opposed to the even number of teams in Pool B, the nation that placed last in Pool B (Malta) was automatically allocated seventh place in Group III.

== Final Placements ==
Placing	Teams
Promoted	Turkey
Promoted	Morocco
Third	Algeria
Third	Egypt
Fifth	Ireland
Sixth	Moldova
Seventh	Malta

- Turkey and Morocco advanced to Group II for 2011. They both placed third in their respective pools, and thus met in the relegation play-off. The Turks won, meaning Turkey remained in Group II, while Morocco was relegated back to Group III for 2012.

== See also ==
- Fed Cup structure
