= 2011 Baku Cup – Doubles =

Doubles
- 2011 Baku Cup

Final
- Champions: (Ukraine) Mariya Koryttseva (Belarus) Tatiana Poutchek
- Runners-up: (Romania) Monica Niculescu (Kazakhstan) Galina Voskoboeva
- Score: 6–3, 2–6, [10–8]

Details
- Draw: 16
- Seeds: 4

Events
Singles	Doubles
- Baku Cup

Mariya Koryttseva and Tatiana Poutchek won the title, beating Monica Niculescu and Galina Voskoboeva in the final, 6–3, 2–6, [10–8].

== Seeds ==
1. (Romania) Monica Niculescu / (Kazakhstan) Galina Voskoboeva (final)
2. (Ukraine) Mariya Koryttseva / (Belarus) Tatiana Poutchek (champions)
3. (Russia) Anastasia Pavlyuchenkova / (Russia) Vera Zvonareva (first round)
4. (Russia) Elena Bovina / (Russia) Valeria Savinykh (semifinals)

== Draw ==
Key

- Q = Qualifier
- WC = Wild card
- LL = Lucky loser
- Alt = Alternate
- ITF = ITF entry
- PR = Protected ranking
- SR = Special ranking
- SE = Special exempt
- JE = Junior exempt
- JR = Junior Accelerator Programme entrant
- CO = College Accelerator Programme entrant
- NG = Next Gen Accelerator Program entrant
- w/o = Walkover
- r = Retired
- d = Defaulted

=== Draw ===
First round
1	(Romania) M Niculescu (Kazakhstan) G Voskoboeva	6	6
(Georgia (country)) T Mikadze (Georgia (country)) S Shapatava	3	2
(Georgia (country)) S Kvatsabaia (Russia) M Shamayko	4	3
WC	(Uzbekistan) N Abduraimova (Azerbaijan) K Farhad	6	6
3	(Russia) A Pavlyuchenkova (Russia) V Zvonareva	3	3
(Ukraine) T Arefyeva (Belarus) A Yakimova	6	6
(Australia) D Dominikovic (Thailand) N Lertcheewakarn	7^{7}	4	[10]
WC	(Georgia (country)) E Gorgodze (Russia) M Zharkova	6^{5}	6	[4]
(Russia) K Pervak (Georgia (country)) A Tatishvili	w/o
(Greece) I Georgatou (Russia) V Solovieva
(Russia) E Makarova (Ukraine) L Tsurenko	3	3
4	(Russia) E Bovina (Russia) V Savinykh	6	6
(Luxembourg) A Kremer (Austria) N Rottmann	3	3
(Ukraine) A Bondarenko (Ukraine) K Bondarenko	6	6
(Russia) V Dolonts (Russia) E Rodina	3	2
2	(Ukraine) M Koryttseva (Belarus) T Poutchek	6	6

Quarterfinals
1	(Romania) M Niculescu (Kazakhstan) G Voskoboeva	6	6
WC	(Uzbekistan) N Abduraimova (Azerbaijan) K Farhad	2	4
(Ukraine) T Arefyeva (Belarus) A Yakimova	2	3
(Australia) D Dominikovic (Thailand) N Lertcheewakarn	6	6
(Russia) K Pervak (Georgia (country)) A Tatishvili	3	2
4	(Russia) E Bovina (Russia) V Savinykh	6	6
(Ukraine) A Bondarenko (Ukraine) K Bondarenko	6	4	[11]
2	(Ukraine) M Koryttseva (Belarus) T Poutchek	3	6	[13]

Semifinals
1	(Romania) M Niculescu (Kazakhstan) G Voskoboeva	6	6
(Australia) D Dominikovic (Thailand) N Lertcheewakarn	4	0
4	(Russia) E Bovina (Russia) V Savinykh	1	7	[7]
2	(Ukraine) M Koryttseva (Belarus) T Poutchek	6	5	[10]

Final
1	(Romania) M Niculescu (Kazakhstan) G Voskoboeva	3	6	[8]
2	(Ukraine) M Koryttseva (Belarus) T Poutchek	6	2	[10]
