= 2011 Baku Cup – Singles qualifying =

This article displays the qualifying draw of the 2011 Baku Cup.

== Players ==
=== Seeds ===
1. (Greece) Irini Georgatou (qualified)
2. (Bosnia and Herzegovina) Jasmina Tinjić (second round)
3. (Russia) Valeria Solovieva (qualified)
4. (Russia) Elena Bovina (qualified)
5. (Georgia (country)) Tatia Mikadze (qualifying competition) (lucky loser)
6. (Russia) Yana Buchina (qualified)
7. (Slovenia) Dalila Jakupovič (qualifying competition)
8. (Australia) Daniella Dominikovic (second round)

=== Qualifiers ===
1. (Greece) Irini Georgatou
2. (Russia) Yana Buchina
3. (Russia) Valeria Solovieva
4. (Russia) Elena Bovina

== Qualifying draw ==
=== First qualifier ===
First round	Second round				Qualifying competition
	1	(Greece) Irini Georgatou	6	6
		(Austria) Nicole Rottmann	3	1
					1	(Greece) Irini Georgatou	6	6
						(Georgia (country)) Ekaterine Gorgodze	3	1
		(Georgia (country)) Ekaterine Gorgodze	6	6
	8	(Australia) Daniella Dominikovic	2	2

=== Second qualifier ===
First round				Second round					Qualifying competition
				2	(Bosnia and Herzegovina) Jasmina Tinjić	5	4
	(Ukraine) Yevgeniya Kryvoruchko	6	6		(Ukraine) Yevgeniya Kryvoruchko	7	6
WC	(Australia) Lauren Breadmore	3	2							(Ukraine) Yevgeniya Kryvoruchko	2	1
									6	(Russia) Yana Buchina	6	6
					(Georgia (country)) Sofia Kvatsabaia	4	7	3
				6	(Russia) Yana Buchina	6	5	6

=== Third qualifier ===
First round			Second round				Qualifying competition
			3	(Russia) Valeria Solovieva	6	6
(Germany) Karolina Nowak	6	6		(Germany) Karolina Nowak	0	0
(Belarus) Tatiana Poutchek	3	2					3	(Russia) Valeria Solovieva	1	6	6
							5	(Georgia (country)) Tatia Mikadze	6	3	1
			WC	(Uzbekistan) Sabina Sharipova	5	4
			5	(Georgia (country)) Tatia Mikadze	7	6

=== Fourth qualifier ===
First round				Second round				Qualifying competition
				4	(Russia) Elena Bovina	6	6
					(Russia) Marina Shamayko	3	1
								4	(Russia) Elena Bovina	6	6
	(Russia) Maria Zharkova	6	6					7	(Slovenia) Dalila Jakupovič	1	0
WC	(Belgium) Caroline van de Wijgaart	2	1		(Russia) Maria Zharkova	3	6^{0}
				7	(Slovenia) Dalila Jakupovič	6	7^{7}
