= 2011 Baku Cup – Singles =

Singles
- 2011 Baku Cup

Final
- Champion: (Russia) Vera Zvonareva
- Runner-up: (Russia) Ksenia Pervak
- Score: 6–1, 6–4

Details
- Draw: 32
- Seeds: 8

Events
Singles	Doubles
- Baku Cup

First-seeded Vera Zvonareva won the first edition of this tournament, defeating Ksenia Pervak in the final, 6–1, 6–4.

== Seeds ==
1. (Russia) Vera Zvonareva (champion)
2. (Russia) Anastasia Pavlyuchenkova (quarterfinals)
3. (Russia) Elena Vesnina (second round, retired due to viral illness)
4. (Russia) Ekaterina Makarova (second round)
5. (Romania) Monica Niculescu (second round)
6. (United Kingdom) Elena Baltacha (first round)
7. (Russia) Ksenia Pervak (final)
8. (Russia) Evgeniya Rodina (first round)

== Draw ==
Key

- Q = Qualifier
- WC = Wild card
- LL = Lucky loser
- Alt = Alternate
- ITF = ITF entry
- PR = Protected ranking
- SR = Special ranking
- SE = Special exempt
- JE = Junior exempt
- JR = Junior Accelerator Programme entrant
- CO = College Accelerator Programme entrant
- NG = Next Gen Accelerator Program entrant
- w/o = Walkover
- r = Retired
- d = Defaulted

=== Finals ===
Semifinals
1	(Russia) Vera Zvonareva	6	6
(Ukraine) Mariya Koryttseva	1	2
7	(Russia) Ksenia Pervak	1	6	6
(Kazakhstan) Galina Voskoboeva	6	0	2

Final
1	(Russia) Vera Zvonareva	6	6
7	(Russia) Ksenia Pervak	1	4

=== Top half ===
First round
1	(Russia) V Zvonareva	6	7
WC	(Uzbekistan) N Abduraimova	1	5
(Slovakia) K Kučová	6	6
(Ukraine) T Arefyeva	3	3
WC	(Russia) N Khrisanova	0	0
LL	(Georgia (country)) T Mikadze	6	6
(Georgia (country)) A Tatishvili	6	6
8	(Russia) E Rodina	4	2
4	(Russia) E Makarova	6	6
(Luxembourg) A Kremer	1	4
(Ukraine) L Tsurenko	3	2
(Ukraine) K Bondarenko	6	6
(Russia) V Savinykh	3	4
(Belarus) A Yakimova	6	6
(Ukraine) M Koryttseva	6	7
6	(United Kingdom) E Baltacha	1	5

Second round
1	(Russia) V Zvonareva	6	3
(Slovakia) K Kučová	0	0	r
LL	(Georgia (country)) T Mikadze	6^{4}	3
(Georgia (country)) A Tatishvili	7^{7}	6
4	(Russia) E Makarova	1	4
(Ukraine) K Bondarenko	6	6
(Belarus) A Yakimova	2	5
(Ukraine) M Koryttseva	6	7

Quarterfinals
1	(Russia) V Zvonareva	7	6^{4}	6
(Georgia (country)) A Tatishvili	5	7^{7}	2
(Ukraine) K Bondarenko	5	4
(Ukraine) M Koryttseva	7	6

Semifinals
1	(Russia) V Zvonareva	6	6
(Ukraine) M Koryttseva	1	2

=== Bottom half ===
First round
7	(Russia) K Pervak	3	6	7
(Thailand) N Lertcheewakarn	6	1	5
(Ukraine) A Bondarenko	3	3
(Russia) V Dolonts	6	6
WC	(Azerbaijan) K Farhad	0	2
(France) A Rezaï	6	6
Q	(Russia) Y Buchina	2	6	5
3	(Russia) E Vesnina	6	3	7
5	(Romania) M Niculescu	5
Q	(Greece) E Georgatou	1	r
(Kazakhstan) G Voskoboeva	6	6
(Georgia (country)) S Shapatava	0	0
(Kazakhstan) Z Diyas	0	6	5
Q	(Russia) E Bovina	6	3	7
Q	(Russia) V Solovieva	5	4
2	(Russia) A Pavlyuchenkova	7	6

Second round
7	(Russia) K Pervak	6	6
(Russia) V Dolonts	3	3
(France) A Rezaï	6	1
3	(Russia) E Vesnina	3	0	r
5	(Romania) M Niculescu	6^{2}	2
(Kazakhstan) G Voskoboeva	7^{7}	6
Q	(Russia) E Bovina	4	0
2	(Russia) A Pavlyuchenkova	6	6

Quarterfinals
7	(Russia) K Pervak	6	6
(France) A Rezaï	1	2
(Kazakhstan) G Voskoboeva	6^{5}	6	6
2	(Russia) A Pavlyuchenkova	7^{7}	4	3

Semifinals
7	(Russia) K Pervak	1	6	6
(Kazakhstan) G Voskoboeva	6	0	2
