= 2011 Fed Cup Europe/Africa Zone Group II – play-offs =

International tennis competition play-offs

The play-offs of the 2011 Fed Cup Europe/Africa Zone Group II were the final stages of the Group II Zonal Competition involving teams from Europe and Africa. Using the positions determined in their pools, the seven teams faced off to determine their placing in the 2011 Fed Cup Europe/Africa Zone Group II. The top two teams advanced to Group I, and the bottom two teams were relegated down to the Group III for the next year.

Placing	Pool A	Pool B
1	Portugal	Bosnia and Herzegovina
2	Finland	Georgia
3	Morocco	Turkey
4		Armenia

== Promotion play-offs ==
The first placed teams of each pool played against the second-placed teams of the other pool in head-to-head rounds. The winner of each round advanced to the 2012 Europe/Africa Zone Group I.

=== Portugal vs. Georgia ===
Portugal
2
Smash Tennis Academy, Cairo, Egypt
May 7, 2011
Red clay (outdoors)

Georgia
0

			1	2	3
1	(Portugal) (Georgia (country))	Maria João Köhler; Tatia Mikadze	6; 2	6; 2
2	(Portugal) (Georgia (country))	Michelle Larcher de Brito; Sofia Shapatava	3; 6	6; 4	7^{8} 6^{6}
3	(Portugal) (Georgia (country))	Maria João Köhler / Michelle Larcher de Brito; Tatia Mikadze / Sofia Shapatava				not played

=== Bosnia and Herzegovina vs. Finland ===
Bosnia and Herzegovina
2
Smash Tennis Academy, Cairo, Egypt
May 7, 2011
Red clay (outdoors)

Finland
1

			1	2	3
1	(Bosnia and Herzegovina) (Finland)	Mervana Jugić-Salkić; Piia Suomalainen	3; 6	6; 4	6; 0
2	(Bosnia and Herzegovina) (Finland)	Jasmina Tinjić; Emma Laine	1; 6	3; 6
3	(Bosnia and Herzegovina) (Finland)	Mervana Jugić-Salkić / Jasmina Tinjić; Emma Laine / Piia Suomalainen	6; 1	6; 4

== Relegation play-offs ==
The third placed teams of each pool were drawn in head-to-head rounds. The loser was relegated down to Europe/Africa Zone Group III in 2012.

=== Morocco vs. Turkey ===
Morocco
0
Smash Tennis Academy, Cairo, Egypt
May 7, 2011
Red clay (outdoors)

Turkey
2

			1	2	3
1	(Morocco) (Turkey)	Nadia Lalami; Pemra Özgen	4; 6	7; 5	5; 7
2	(Morocco) (Turkey)	Fatima El Allami; Çağla Büyükakçay	2; 6	1; 6
3	(Morocco) (Turkey)	Lina Bennani / Fatima El Allami; İpek Şenoğlu / Melis Sezer				not played

- Armenia came last out of Pool B, but could not be drawn against anyone due to the odd number of teams in Pool A. As such, Armenia was automatically relegated down to Europe/Africa Zone Group III for 2012.

== Final Placements ==
Placing	Teams	
Promoted	Portugal	Bosnia and Herzegovina
Third	Georgia	Finland
Fifth	Turkey	
Relegated	Morocco	Armenia

- Portugal and Bosnia and Herzegovina advanced to the Europe/Africa Zone Group I for the next year. The Portuguese placed fifth overall, while the Bosnians and Herzegovinians placed eleventh.
- Morocco and Armenia were relegated down to Europe/Africa Zone Group III for the next year, where they respectively placed third and seventh overall.

== See also ==
- Fed Cup structure
