= 2010 Fed Cup Europe/Africa Zone Group III – Pool B =

Group B of the 2010 Fed Cup Europe/Africa Zone Group III was one of two pools in the Europe/Africa Zone Group III of the 2010 Fed Cup. Three teams competed in a round robin competition, with the top two teams and the bottom team proceeding to their respective sections of the play-offs: the top teams played for advancement to the Group II.

		(Morocco) MLT	(Republic of Ireland) IRL	(Malta) MLT	(Algeria) ALG	RR; W–L	Set; W–L	Game; W–L	Standings
72	Morocco		3–0	3–0	3–0	3–0	18–2	115–55	1
75	Ireland	0–3		3–0	1–2	1–2	11–12	99–113	3
81	Malta	0–3	0–3		1–2	0–3	3–16	70–109	4
91	Algeria	0–3	2–1	2–1		2–1	10–12	93–100	2

== Morocco vs. Algeria ==
Morocco
3
Smash Tennis Academy, Cairo, Egypt
21 April 2010
Clay (outdoors)

Algeria
0

			1	2	3
1	(Morocco) (Algeria)	Nadia Lalami; Assia Halo	6; 0	6; 4
2	(Morocco) (Algeria)	Fatima El Allami; Fatima Zorah Bouabdallah	2; 6	6; 4	6; 0
3	(Morocco) (Algeria)	Lina Bennani / Nadia Lalami; Fatima Zorah Bouabdallah / Assia Halo	6; 2	6; 1

== Ireland vs. Malta ==
Ireland
3
Smash Tennis Academy, Cairo, Egypt
21 April 2010
Clay (outdoors)

Malta
0

			1	2	3
1	(Republic of Ireland) (Malta)	Amy Bowtell; Elaine Genovese	6; 3	2; 6	6; 3
2	(Republic of Ireland) (Malta)	Julia Moriarty; Kimberley Cassar	6; 4	7; 5
3	(Republic of Ireland) (Malta)	Amy Bowtell / Julia Moriarty; Kimberley Cassar / Elaine Genovese	7^{7} 6^{1}	6; 2

== Morocco vs. Ireland ==
Morocco
3
Smash Tennis Academy, Cairo, Egypt
22 April 2010
Clay (outdoors)

Ireland
0

			1	2	3
1	(Morocco) (Republic of Ireland)	Nadia Lalami; Amy Bowtell	6; 2	6; 0
2	(Morocco) (Republic of Ireland)	Fatima El Allami; Julia Moriarty	6; 3	6; 3
3	(Morocco) (Republic of Ireland)	Lina Bennani / Nadia Lalami; Niamh Coveney / Julia Moriarty	6; 4	4; 6	6; 3

== Malta vs. Algeria ==
Malta
1
Smash Tennis Academy, Cairo, Egypt
22 April 2010
Clay (outdoors)

Algeria
2

			1	2	3
1	(Malta) (Algeria)	Elaine Genovese; Assia Halo	2; 6	3; 6
2	(Malta) (Algeria)	Kimberley Cassar; Fatima Zorah Bouabdallah	7^{7} 6^{5}	6; 2
3	(Malta) (Algeria)	Kimberley Cassar / Elaine Genovese; Fatima Zorah Bouabdallah / Assia Halo	4; 6	2; 6

== Morocco vs. Malta ==
Morocco
3
Smash Tennis Academy, Cairo, Egypt
23 April 2010
Clay (outdoors)

Malta
0

			1	2	3
1	(Morocco) (Malta)	Lina Bennani; Elaine Genovese	7; 5	6; 2
2	(Morocco) (Malta)	Fatima El Allami; Kimberley Cassar	6; 2	6; 2
3	(Morocco) (Malta)	Fatima El Allami / Nadia Lalami; Elaine Genovese / Stephanie Sullivan	6; 2	6; 4

== Ireland vs. Algeria ==
Ireland
1
Smash Tennis Academy, Cairo, Egypt
23 April 2010
Clay (outdoors)

Algeria
2

			1	2	3
1	(Republic of Ireland) (Algeria)	Amy Bowtell; Assia Halo	6; 0	6^{5} 7^{7}	1; 6
2	(Republic of Ireland) (Algeria)	Julia Moriarty; Fatima Zorah Bouabdallah	6; 0	3; 6	6; 4
3	(Republic of Ireland) (Algeria)	Lynsey McCullough / Julia Moriarty; Fatima Zorah Bouabdallah / Assia Halo	3; 6	6; 3	1; 6

== See also ==
- Fed Cup structure
