= 2011 Grand Prix SAR La Princesse Lalla Meryem – Doubles =

Doubles
- 2011 Grand Prix SAR La Princesse Lalla Meryem

Final
- Champions: (Czech Republic) Andrea Hlaváčková (Czech Republic) Renata Voráčová
- Runners-up: (Russia) Nina Bratchikova (Austria) Sandra Klemenschits
- Score: 6–3, 6–4

Events
Singles	Doubles
← 2010 ·	Grand Prix SAR La Princesse Lalla Meryem	· 2012 →

Iveta Benešová and Anabel Medina Garrigues were the defending champions, but decided not to participate.
Andrea Hlaváčková and Renata Voráčová won the title, defeating Nina Bratchikova and Sandra Klemenschits 6–3, 6–4 in the final.

== Seeds ==
1. (Czech Republic) Andrea Hlaváčková / (Czech Republic) Renata Voráčová (champions)
2. (France) Alizé Cornet / (Romania) Ioana Raluca Olaru (first round)
3. (Greece) Eleni Daniilidou / (Russia) Alexandra Panova (first round)
4. (Bosnia and Herzegovina) Mervana Jugić-Salkić / (Croatia) Darija Jurak (semifinals)

== Draw ==
=== Key ===
- Q = Qualifier
- WC = Wild card
- LL = Lucky loser
- Alt = Alternate
- SE = Special exempt
- PR = Protected ranking
- ITF = ITF entry
- JE = Junior exempt
- w/o = Walkover
- r = Retired
- d = Defaulted
- SR = Special ranking

=== Draw ===
First round
1	(Czech Republic) A Hlaváčková (Czech Republic) R Voráčová	6	7
WC	(Peru) B Botto (Morocco) N Lalami	2	6^{2}
WC	(Morocco) L Bennani (Morocco) FZ El Allami	2	2
(United States) A Rolle (United States) M Washington	6	6
4	(Bosnia and Herzegovina) M Jugić-Salkić (Croatia) D Jurak	6	6
(United States) L Lee-Waters (United States) M Moulton-Levy	4	0
(Slovenia) P Hercog (Russia) K Pervak	6	1	[10]
(Russia) A Kudryavtseva (Russia) A Rodionova	4	6	[6]
(Russia) N Bratchikova (Austria) S Klemenschits	7	5	[10]
(United States) J Craybas (South Africa) C Scheepers	6^{1}	7	[7]
(United States) S Stephens (France) A Védy	7	3	[10]
3	(Greece) E Daniilidou (Russia) A Panova	6^{5}	6	[4]
(Latvia) L Dekmeijere (Australia) J Moore	1	1
(Russia) D Safina (Kazakhstan) G Voskoboeva	6	6
(Romania) I-C Begu (Romania) E Bogdan	5	7	[10]
2	(France) A Cornet (Romania) IR Olaru	7	5	[7]

Quarterfinals
1	(Czech Republic) A Hlaváčková (Czech Republic) R Voráčová	6	6
(United States) A Rolle (United States) M Washington	0	2
4	(Bosnia and Herzegovina) M Jugić-Salkić (Croatia) D Jurak	w/o
(Slovenia) P Hercog (Russia) K Pervak
(Russia) N Bratchikova (Austria) S Klemenschits	6	6
(United States) S Stephens (France) A Védy	4	4
(Russia) D Safina (Kazakhstan) G Voskoboeva	6	6
(Romania) I-C Begu (Romania) E Bogdan	3	4

Semifinals
1	(Czech Republic) A Hlaváčková (Czech Republic) R Voráčová	6	7
4	(Bosnia and Herzegovina) M Jugić-Salkić (Croatia) D Jurak	3	5
(Russia) N Bratchikova (Austria) S Klemenschits	w/o
(Russia) D Safina (Kazakhstan) G Voskoboeva

Final
1	(Czech Republic) A Hlaváčková (Czech Republic) R Voráčová	6	6
(Russia) N Bratchikova (Austria) S Klemenschits	3	4
