= 2009 Fed Cup Europe/Africa Zone Group II – play-offs =

The play-offs of the 2009 Fed Cup Europe/Africa Zone Group II were the final stages of the Group II Zonal Competition involving teams from Europe and Africa. Those that placed first and second in their respective pools competed for promotion, while those that placed third were automatically relegated down to Group III.

Placing	Pool A	Pool B
1	Latvia	South Africa
2	Portugal	Georgia
3	Morocco	Turkey

== Promotion play-offs ==
The first placed teams of each pool were placed against the second placed teams of the other pools. The winner of the rounds advanced to the Group I for next year.

=== Latvia vs. Georgia ===
Latvia
3
Attaleya Shine Tennis Club, Antalya, Turkey
25 April 2009
Decoturf II (outdoors)

Georgia
0

			1	2	3
1	(Latvia) (Georgia (country))	Irina Kuzmina; Sofia Shapatava	6; 3	6; 4
2	(Latvia) (Georgia (country))	Anastasija Sevastova; Anna Tatishvili	0; 6	6; 1	6; 4
3	(Latvia) (Georgia (country))	Līga Dekmeijere / Diāna Marcinkēviča; Manana Shapakidze / Sofia Shapatava	6; 1	6; 2

=== Portugal vs. South Africa ===
Portugal
2
Attaleya Shine Tennis Club, Antalya, Turkey
22 April 2009
Decoturf II (outdoors)

South Africa
0

			1	2	3
1	(Portugal) (South Africa)	Neuza Silva; Lizaan du Plessis	6; 2	6; 3
2	(Portugal) (South Africa)	Michelle Larcher de Brito; Natalie Grandin	6; 4	6; 3
3	(Portugal) (South Africa)					not played

== Final Placements ==
Placing	Teams	
Promoted	Latvia	Portugal
Third	Georgia	South Africa
Relegated	Morocco	Turkey

- Latvia and Portugal advanced to the Europe/Africa Zone Group I for the next year. Both teams placed last in their respective pools, meaning that they both competed in the relegation play-offs. However, the Latvians won their tie while the Portuguese lost, meaning the latter team was relegated back to Group II for 2011.
- Morocco and Turkey were relegated down to Europe/Africa Zone Group III for the next year. Both teams placed first in their respective pools, and ended up winning their promotional play-off ties, meaning they advanced back to Group II for 2011.

== See also ==
- Fed Cup structure
