= 2010 Grand Prix SAR La Princesse Lalla Meryem – Singles =

Singles
- 2010 Grand Prix SAR La Princesse Lalla Meryem

Final
- Champion: (Czech Republic) Iveta Benešová
- Runner-up: (Romania) Simona Halep
- Score: 6-4, 6-2

Events
Singles	Doubles
- Grand Prix SAR La Princesse Lalla Meryem

Anabel Medina Garrigues, was the defending champion, but lost to Laura Pous Tió in the second round.

Iveta Benešová defeated Simona Halep in the final 6-4, 6-2.

== Seeds ==
1. (Spain) Carla Suárez Navarro (second round, retired due to an ankle injury)
2. (Switzerland) Patty Schnyder (quarterfinals)
3. (Spain) Anabel Medina Garrigues (second round)
4. (Hungary) Melinda Czink (first round)
5. (Germany) Angelique Kerber (quarterfinals)
6. (Croatia) Petra Martić (first round)
7. (Czech Republic) Iveta Benešová (champion)
8. (Czech Republic) Lucie Hradecká (first round)

== Draw ==
Key

- Q = Qualifier
- WC = Wild card
- LL = Lucky loser
- Alt = Alternate
- ITF = ITF entry
- PR = Protected ranking
- SR = Special ranking
- SE = Special exempt
- JE = Junior exempt
- JR = Junior Accelerator Programme entrant
- CO = College Accelerator Programme entrant
- NG = Next Gen Accelerator Program entrant
- w/o = Walkover
- r = Retired
- d = Defaulted

=== Finals ===
Semifinals
(France) Alizé Cornet	3	6	5
7	(Czech Republic) Iveta Benešová	6	4	7
(Czech Republic) Renata Voráčová	5	4
Q	(Romania) Simona Halep	7	6

Final
7	(Czech Republic) Iveta Benešová	6	6
Q	(Romania) Simona Halep	4	2

=== Top half ===
First round
1	(Spain) C Suárez Navarro	6	5	6
(Italy) A Floris	1	7	1
(United Kingdom) A Keothavong	6	0	6
(France) J Coin	3	6	4
(Russia) V Manasieva	6	3	3
(Spain) A Parra Santonja	2	6	6
(France) A Cornet	7	6
6	(Croatia) P Martić	6^{3}	4
3	(Spain) A Medina Garrigues	6	6
WC	(Morocco) L Bennani	0	0
Q	(Spain) L Pous Tió	6	7
(Australia) J Groth	0	6^{4}
Q	(France) C de Gubernatis	7	6
WC	(Morocco) N Lalami	6^{1}	3
(Australia) O Rogowska	0	4
7	(Czech Republic) I Benešová	6	6

Second round
1	(Spain) C Suárez Navarro	6	r
(United Kingdom) A Keothavong	5
(Spain) A Parra Santonja	2	2
(France) A Cornet	6	6
3	(Spain) A Medina Garrigues	3	2
Q	(Spain) L Pous Tió	6	6
Q	(France) C de Gubernatis	2	4
7	(Czech Republic) I Benešová	6	6

Quarterfinals
(United Kingdom) A Keothavong	5	2
(France) A Cornet	7	6
Q	(Spain) L Pous Tió	6	1	0
7	(Czech Republic) I Benešová	2	6	6

Semifinals
(France) A Cornet	3	6	5
7	(Czech Republic) I Benešová	6	4	7

=== Bottom half ===
First round
5	(Germany) A Kerber	6	6
WC	(Morocco) FZ El Allami	0	1
(Czech Republic) B Záhlavová-Strýcová	3	1
(Serbia) B Jovanovski	6	6
(United Kingdom) K O'Brien	6	4	6
(France) P Parmentier	2	6	3
(Czech Republic) R Voráčová	6	7
4	(Hungary) M Czink	4	6^{5}
8	(Czech Republic) L Hradecká	5	1
Q	(Romania) S Halep	7	6
(Ukraine) O Savchuk	6	7
(Austria) P Mayr	4	6^{0}
(Romania) IR Olaru	6	2	6
(Czech Republic) K Zakopalová	4	6	4
Q	(Hungary) G Arn	6	5	1
2	(Switzerland) P Schnyder	4	7	6

Second round
5	(Germany) A Kerber	6	6
(Serbia) B Jovanovski	2	2
(United Kingdom) K O'Brien	0	5
(Czech Republic) R Voráčová	6	7
Q	(Romania) S Halep	6	6
(Ukraine) O Savchuk	3	1
(Romania) IR Olaru	3	6	2
2	(Switzerland) P Schnyder	6	3	6

Quarterfinals
5	(Germany) A Kerber	5	2
(Czech Republic) R Voráčová	7	6
Q	(Romania) S Halep	6	7
2	(Switzerland) P Schnyder	2	6^{3}

Semifinals
(Czech Republic) R Voráčová	5	4
Q	(Romania) S Halep	7	6
