= 2010 Grand Prix SAR La Princesse Lalla Meryem =

Tennis tournament in Morocco

- Date: 26 April – 1 May
- Edition: 10th
- Category: WTA International
- Draw: 32S / 16D
- Prize money: $220,000
- Surface: Clay / outdoor
- Location: Fes, Morocco

Champions

Singles
- (Czech Republic) Iveta Benešová

Doubles
- (Czech Republic) Iveta Benešová / (Spain) Anabel Medina Garrigues
- Morocco Open

The 2010 Grand Prix SAR La Princesse Lalla Meryem was a women's tennis tournament played on outdoor clay courts. It was the 10th edition of the tournament, and was part of the International category of the 2010 WTA Tour. It took place in Fes, Morocco, from 26 April until 1 May 2010. Seventh-seeded Iveta Benešová won the singles title.

== Finals ==
=== Singles ===
(Czech Republic) Iveta Benešová defeated (Romania) Simona Halep, 6–4, 6–2

- It was Benešová's only singles title of the year and the second and last of her career.

=== Doubles ===
(Czech Republic) Iveta Benešová / (Spain) Anabel Medina Garrigues defeated (Czech Republic) Lucie Hradecká / (Czech Republic) Renata Voráčová, 6–3, 6–1

== Entrants ==
=== Seeds ===
Player	Nationality	Ranking*	Seeding
Carla Suárez Navarro	Spain	40	1
Patty Schnyder	Switzerland	47	2
Anabel Medina Garrigues	Spain	48	3
Melinda Czink	Hungary	51	4
Angelique Kerber	Germany	61	5
Petra Martić	Croatia	65	6
Iveta Benešová	Czech Republic	67	7
Lucie Hradecká	Czech Republic	74	8

- Rankings as of April 19, 2010.

=== Other entrants ===
The following players received wildcards into the main draw:

- (Morocco) Lina Bennani
- (Morocco) Nadia Lalami
- (Morocco) Fatima Zahrae El Allami

The following players received entry from the qualifying draw:

- (Hungary) Gréta Arn
- (France) Claire de Gubernatis
- (Romania) Simona Halep
- (Spain) Laura Pous Tió
