= 2010 Grand Prix SAR La Princesse Lalla Meryem – Doubles =

Doubles
- 2010 Grand Prix SAR La Princesse Lalla Meryem

Final
- Champions: (Czech Republic) Iveta Benešová (Spain) Anabel Medina Garrigues
- Runners-up: (Czech Republic) Lucie Hradecká (Czech Republic) Renata Voráčová
- Score: 6–3, 6–1

Events
Singles	Doubles
← 2009 ·	Grand Prix SAR La Princesse Lalla Meryem	· 2011 →

Alisa Kleybanova and Ekaterina Makarova were the defending champions, however they chose not to compete this year.
Iveta Benešová and Anabel Medina Garrigues won in the final 6–3, 6–1, against Lucie Hradecká and Renata Voráčová.

== Seeds ==
1. (Czech Republic) Iveta Benešová / (Spain) Anabel Medina Garrigues (champions)
2. (Czech Republic) Lucie Hradecká / (Czech Republic) Renata Voráčová (final)
3. (Ukraine) Olga Savchuk / (United States) Riza Zalameda (first round)
4. (Hungary) Melinda Czink / (Spain) Arantxa Parra Santonja (quarterfinals)

== Draw ==
=== Key ===
- Q = Qualifier
- WC = Wild card
- LL = Lucky loser
- Alt = Alternate
- SE = Special exempt
- PR = Protected ranking
- ITF = ITF entry
- JE = Junior exempt
- w/o = Walkover
- r = Retired
- d = Defaulted
- SR = Special ranking

=== Draw ===
First round
1	(Czech Republic) I Benešová (Spain) A Medina Garrigues	6	6
(Croatia) P Martić (Switzerland) P Schnyder	2	2
(Australia) J Groth (United Kingdom) A Keothavong	6	6
WC	(Morocco) L Bennani (Morocco) I Rassif	1	0
3	(Ukraine) O Savchuk (United States) R Zalameda	6^{3}	6^{1}
(France) J Coin (France) A Cornet	7	7
WC	(Morocco) FZ El Allami (Morocco) N Lalami	0	3
(United Kingdom) K O'Brien (Romania) IR Olaru	6	6
(Russia) M Kondratieva (France) S Lefèvre	3	6	3
(Russia) V Manasieva (Czech Republic) K Zakopalová	6	2	[10]
(Poland) K Kosińska (France) L Thorpe	0	1
4	(Hungary) M Czink (Spain) A Parra Santonja	6	6
(Spain) E Cabeza Candela (Spain) L Pous Tió	4	7	[10]
(Russia) E Bovina (Slovenia) A Klepač	6	5	[6]
(Germany) A Kerber (France) A Védy	3	4
2	(Czech Republic) L Hradecká (Czech Republic) R Voráčová	6	6

Quarterfinals
1	(Czech Republic) I Benešová (Spain) A Medina Garrigues	6	6
(Australia) J Groth (United Kingdom) A Keothavong	1	3
(France) J Coin (France) A Cornet	6	6
(United Kingdom) K O'Brien (Romania) IR Olaru	2	2
(Russia) V Manasieva (Czech Republic) K Zakopalová	6	7
4	(Hungary) M Czink (Spain) A Parra Santonja	2	6^{3}
(Spain) E Cabeza Candela (Spain) L Pous Tió	2	1
2	(Czech Republic) L Hradecká (Czech Republic) R Voráčová	6	6

Semifinals
1	(Czech Republic) I Benešová (Spain) A Medina Garrigues	6	7
(France) J Coin (France) A Cornet	4	5
(Russia) V Manasieva (Czech Republic) K Zakopalová	5	1
2	(Czech Republic) L Hradecká (Czech Republic) R Voráčová	7	6

Finals
1	(Czech Republic) I Benešová (Spain) A Medina Garrigues	6	6
2	(Czech Republic) L Hradecká (Czech Republic) R Voráčová	3	1
