= 2011 Grand Prix SAR La Princesse Lalla Meryem – Singles qualifying =

Ladies' Tennis Sport Event in 2011

This article displays the qualifying draw of the 2011 Grand Prix SAR La Princesse Lalla Meryem.

== Players ==
=== Seeds ===
1. (Romania) Irina-Camelia Begu (qualified)
2. (Russia) Alexandra Panova (second round)
3. (Poland) Urszula Radwańska (qualified)
4. (Spain) Silvia Soler Espinosa (qualified)
5. (Greece) Eleni Daniilidou (qualifying competition) (lucky loser)
6. (United States) Sloane Stephens (qualifying competition)
7. (Romania) Ioana Raluca Olaru (first round)
8. (Poland) Magda Linette (first round)

=== Qualifiers ===
1. (Romania) Irina-Camelia Begu
2. (Czech Republic) Kristýna Plíšková
3. (Poland) Urszula Radwańska
4. (Spain) Silvia Soler Espinosa

=== Lucky losers ===
1. (Greece) Eleni Daniilidou

== Qualifying draw ==
=== First qualifier ===
First round
1	(Romania) Irina-Camelia Begu	6	6
(Romania) Elena Bogdan	2	1
(Peru) Bianca Botto	6	6
WC	(Morocco) Fatyha Berjane	0	1
(Colombia) Mariana Duque	6	6
(France) Kristina Mladenovic	2	4
(Israel) Julia Glushko	1	3
6	(United States) Sloane Stephens	6	6

Second round
1	(Romania) Irina-Camelia Begu	6	6
(Peru) Bianca Botto	1	3
(Colombia) Mariana Duque	5	6	6^{10}
6	(United States) Sloane Stephens	7	3	7

Qualifying competition
1	(Romania) Irina-Camelia Begu	7^{7}	6
6	(United States) Sloane Stephens	6^{4}	2

=== Second qualifier ===
First round
2	(Russia) Alexandra Panova	6	6
(Austria) Melanie Klaffner	3	3
(Spain) Lara Arruabarrena-Vecino	5	0
(France) Séverine Beltrame	7	6
(Spain) Leticia Costas-Moreira	6	6
WC	(Morocco) Intissar Rassif	2	1
(Czech Republic) Kristýna Plíšková	7	6
8	(Poland) Magda Linette	6^{9}	4

Second round
2	(Russia) Alexandra Panova	3	7	3
(France) Séverine Beltrame	6	5	6
(Spain) Leticia Costas-Moreira	5	1
(Czech Republic) Kristýna Plíšková	7	6

Qualifying competition
(France) Séverine Beltrame	4	6^{7}
(Czech Republic) Kristýna Plíšková	6	7

=== Third qualifier ===
First round
3	(Poland) Urszula Radwańska	6	6
(Czech Republic) Karolína Plíšková	2	4
WC	(Morocco) Lina Bennani	1	2
(Portugal) Maria João Koehler	6	6
(Romania) Alexandra Cadanţu	3	6	4
(United States) Lindsay Lee-Waters	6	2	6
(Colombia) Catalina Castaño	6	7
7	(Romania) Ioana Raluca Olaru	4	6^{5}

Second round
3	(Poland) Urszula Radwańska	3	6	6
(Portugal) Maria João Koehler	6	4	4
(United States) Lindsay Lee-Waters	3	3
(Colombia) Catalina Castaño	6	6

Qualifying competition
3	(Poland) Urszula Radwańska	7	7
(Colombia) Catalina Castaño	5	6^{3}

=== Fourth qualifier ===
First round
4	(Spain) Silvia Soler Espinosa	4	6	6
(Australia) Johanna Konta	6	3	3
WC	(Morocco) Habiba Ifrakh	2	0
(United States) Ahsha Rolle	6	6
(Australia) Jessica Moore	6^{5}	1
(Poland) Katarzyna Piter	7	6
(Russia) Arina Rodionova	6	3	4
5	(Greece) Eleni Daniilidou	4	6	6

Second round
4	(Spain) Silvia Soler Espinosa	7	6
(United States) Ahsha Rolle	5	2
(Poland) Katarzyna Piter	2	4
5	(Greece) Eleni Daniilidou	6	6

Qualifying competition
4	(Spain) Silvia Soler Espinosa	6	6
5	(Greece) Eleni Daniilidou	0	4
