= 2009 Fed Cup Europe/Africa Zone Group II – Pool A =

Group A of the 2009 Fed Cup Europe/Africa Zone Group II was one of two pools in the Europe/Africa Zone Group II of the 2009 Fed Cup. Three teams competed in a round robin competition, with the top team and the bottom two teams proceeding to their respective sections of the play-offs: the top teams played for advancement to Group I, while the bottom team faced relegation to Group III.

		(Portugal) POR	(Latvia) LAT	(Morocco) MAR	RR; W–L	Set; W–L	Game; W–L	Standings
51	Portugal		1–2	3–0	1–1	8–4	56–38	2
56	Latvia	2–1		3–0	2–0	10–3	66–37	1
65	Morocco	0–3	0–3		0–2	1–12	29–76	3

== Portugal vs. Morocco ==
Portugal
3
Attaleya Shine Tennis Club, Antalya, Turkey
22 April 2009
Decoturf II (outdoors)

Morocco
0

			1	2	3
1	(Portugal) (Morocco)	Neuza Silva; Nadia Lalami	6; 1	6; 0
2	(Portugal) (Morocco)	Michelle Larcher de Brito; Fatima El Allami	6; 4	7; 5
3	(Portugal) (Morocco)	Frederica Piedade / Neuza Silva; Fatima El Allami / Nadia Lalami	6; 0	6; 1

== Latvia vs. Morocco ==
Latvia
3
Attaleya Shine Tennis Club, Antalya, Turkey
23 April 2009
Decoturf II (outdoors)

Morocco
0

			1	2	3
1	(Latvia) (Morocco)	Irina Kuzmina; Nadia Lalami	3; 6	6; 4	6; 2
2	(Latvia) (Morocco)	Anastasija Sevastova; Fatima El Allami	6; 3	6; 0
3	(Latvia) (Morocco)	Līga Dekmeijere / Anastasija Sevastova; Lina Bennani / Habiba Ifrakh	6; 1	6; 2

== Portugal vs. Latvia ==
Portugal
1
Attaleya Shine Tennis Club, Antalya, Turkey
24 April 2009
Decoturf II (outdoors)

Latvia
2

			1	2	3
1	(Portugal) (Latvia)	Neuza Silva; Irina Kuzmina	6; 2	6; 1
2	(Portugal) (Latvia)	Michelle Larcher de Brito; Anastasija Sevastova	2; 6	3; 6
3	(Portugal) (Latvia)	Frederica Piedade / Neuza Silva; Līga Dekmeijere / Anastasija Sevastova	1; 6	1; 6

== See also ==
- Fed Cup structure
