= Jasmina Kajtazovič =

Slovenian-born Bosnian tennis player

- Country (sports): Slovenia (–2008); Bosnia and Herzegovina (2009–2014)
- Born: 26 February 1991 (age 34); Novo Mesto, SFR Yugoslavia
- Prize money: $23,927

Singles
- Career record: 89–75
- Career titles: 1 ITF
- Highest ranking: No. 518 (15 September 2008)

Doubles
- Career record: 38–40
- Career titles: 5 ITF
- Highest ranking: No. 516 (20 June 2011)

Team competitions
- Fed Cup: 2–2

Jasmina Kajtazovič (born 26 February 1991) is a retired Slovenian-born Bosnian tennis player.

In her career, she won one singles title and five doubles titles on the ITF Circuit. On 15 September 2008, she reached her best singles ranking of world No. 518. On 20 June 2011, she peaked at No. 516 in the doubles rankings.

Playing for Bosnia and Herzegovina Fed Cup team, Kajtazovič has a win–loss record of 2–2.

== ITF finals ==
=== Singles (1–3) ===
Legend $25,000 tournaments $10,000 tournaments	Finals by surface Hard (1–0) Clay (0–3)

Result	No.	Date	Tournament	Surface	Opponent	Score
Win	1.	3 December 2007	Havana, Cuba	Hard	(Brazil) Vivian Segnini	6–3, 6–1
Loss	1.	23 June 2008	Sarajevo, Bosnia and Herzegovina	Clay	(Croatia) Tereza Mrdeža	3–6, 0–6
Loss	2.	23 August 2010	Doboj, Bosnia and Herzegovina	Clay	(Slovakia) Zuzana Zlochová	6–7^{(4–7)}, 5–7
Loss	3.	12 December 2011	Antalya, Turkey	Clay	(Russia) Daria Salnikova	3–6, 1–6

=== Doubles (5–1) ===
Legend $25,000 tournaments $10,000 tournaments	Finals by surface Hard (0–0) Clay (5–1)

Result	No.	Date	Tournament	Surface	Partner	Opponents	Score
Loss	1.	9 March 2009	ITF Rome, Italy	Clay	(Spain) Lucía Sainz	(Italy) Claudia Giovine (Italy) Valentina Sulpizio	6–4, 0–6, [6–10]
Win	1.	26 July 2010	Palić Open, Serbia	Clay	(Slovakia) Zuzana Zlochová	(Bulgaria) Martina Gledacheva (Italy) Francesca Mazzali	6–1, 4–6, [10–7]
Win	2.	23 August 2010	ITF Doboj, Bosnia and Herzegovina	Clay	(Slovakia) Zuzana Zlochová	(Romania) Alexandra Damaschin (Germany) Anna Zaja	6–1, 6–2
Win	3.	30 August 2010	ITF Brčko, Bosnia and Herzegovina	Clay	(Bosnia and Herzegovina) Ema Burgić	(Romania) Patricia Chirea (Russia) Margarita Lazareva	6–3, 6–3
Win	4.	13 August 2012	ITF Innsbruck, Austria	Clay	(Slovenia) Polona Reberšak	(Czech Republic) Klára Dohnalová (Czech Republic) Lenka Kunčíková	7–5, 2–6, [20–18]
Win	5.	20 August 2012	ITF Braunschweig, Germany	Clay	(Russia) Anna Smolina	(Germany) Kim Grajdek (Poland) Sylwia Zagórska	6–1, 6–3

== Fed Cup participation ==
=== Singles (1–0) ===
Edition	Stage	Date	Location	Against	Surface	Opponent	W/L	Score
2011 Fed Cup; Europe/Africa Zone Group II	R/R	6 May 2011	Cairo, Egypt	Armenia	Clay	(Armenia) Nune Khachatryan	W	6–4, 6–2

=== Doubles (1–2) ===
Edition	Stage	Date	Location	Against	Surface	Partner	Opponents	W/L	Score
2011 Fed Cup; Europe/Africa Zone Group II	R/R	5 May 2011	Cairo, Egypt	(Georgia (country)) Georgia	Clay	(Bosnia and Herzegovina) Ema Burgić	(Georgia (country)) Tatia Mikadze (Georgia (country)) Sofia Shapatava	L	6–4, 1–6, 3–6
2011 Fed Cup; Europe/Africa Zone Group II	R/R	6 May 2011	Cairo, Egypt	Armenia	Clay	(Bosnia and Herzegovina) Ema Burgić	(Armenia) Anna Movsisyan (Armenia) Ofelya Poghosyan	W	6–1, 6–1
2013 Fed Cup; Europe/Africa Zone Group I	R/R	7 February 2013	Eilat, Israel	(United Kingdom) Great Britain	Hard	(Bosnia and Herzegovina) Jelena Simić	(United Kingdom) Johanna Konta (United Kingdom) Laura Robson	L	0–6, 0–6
