= 2009 Fed Cup Europe/Africa Zone Group II – Pool B =

Group B of the 2009 Fed Cup Europe/Africa Zone Group II was one of two pools in the Europe/Africa Zone Group II of the 2009 Fed Cup. Three teams competed in a round robin competition, with the top team and the bottom two teams proceeding to their respective sections of the play-offs: the top teams played for advancement to Group I, while the bottom team faced relegation to Group III.

		(South Africa) RSA	(Georgia (country)) GEO	(Turkey) TUR	RR; W–L	Set; W–L	Game; W–L	Standings
51	South Africa		2–1	2–1	2–0	10–7	88–73	1
57	Georgia	1–2		3–0	1–1	9–6	77–66	2
60	Turkey	1–2	0–3		0–2	5–11	63–89	3

== South Africa vs. Turkey ==
South Africa
2
Attaleya Shine Tennis Club, Antalya, Turkey
22 April 2009
Decoturf II (outdoors)

Turkey
1

			1	2	3
1	(South Africa) (Turkey)	Lizaan du Plessis; Çağla Büyükakçay	7^{9} 6^{7}	5; 7	4; 6
2	(South Africa) (Turkey)	Natalie Grandin; Pemra Özgen	6; 2	3; 6	6; 3
3	(South Africa) (Turkey)	Kelly Anderson / Natalie Grandin; Pemra Özgen / İpek Şenoğlu	3; 6	6; 1	6; 2

== Georgia vs. Turkey ==
Georgia
3
Attaleya Shine Tennis Club, Antalya, Turkey
23 April 2009
Decoturf II (outdoors)

Turkey
0

			1	2	3
1	(Georgia (country)) (Turkey)	Margalita Chakhnashvili; Çağla Büyükakçay	7; 5	6; 2
2	(Georgia (country)) (Turkey)	Anna Tatishvili; Pemra Özgen	6; 0	6; 3
3	(Georgia (country)) (Turkey)	Manana Shapakidze / Sofia Shapatava; İpek Şenoğlu / Melis Sezer	6; 3	6^{4} 7^{7}	6; 4

== South Africa vs. Georgia ==
South Africa
2
Attaleya Shine Tennis Club, Antalya, Turkey
24 April 2009
Decoturf II (outdoors)

Georgia
1

			1	2	3
1	(South Africa) (Georgia (country))	Lizaan du Plessis; Margalita Chakhnashvili	6; 2	6; 4
2	(South Africa) (Georgia (country))	Natalie Grandin; Anna Tatishvili	6; 2	2; 6	4; 6
3	(South Africa) (Georgia (country))	Kelly Anderson / Natalie Grandin; Margalita Chakhnashvili / Sofia Shapatava	6; 4	6^{5} 7^{7}	6; 3

== See also ==
- Fed Cup structure
