= 2011 Grand Prix SAR La Princesse Lalla Meryem – Singles =

Singles
- 2011 Grand Prix SAR La Princesse Lalla Meryem

Final
- Champion: (Italy) Alberta Brianti
- Runner-up: (Romania) Simona Halep
- Score: 6–4, 6–3

Events
Singles	Doubles
- Grand Prix SAR La Princesse Lalla Meryem

Iveta Benešová was the defending champion, but decided not to participate in the tournament.
Alberta Brianti won her first WTA singles title by defeating Simona Halep 6–4, 6–3 in the final.

== Seeds ==
1. (France) Aravane Rezaï (second round)
2. (Kazakhstan) Yaroslava Shvedova (second round)
3. (Spain) Lourdes Domínguez Lino (first round)
4. (Hungary) Gréta Arn (quarterfinals)
5. (Germany) Angelique Kerber (first round)
6. (Australia) Jelena Dokić (withdrew due to illness)
7. (Romania) Simona Halep (final)
8. (France) Alizé Cornet (second round)

== Draw ==
Key

- Q = Qualifier
- WC = Wild card
- LL = Lucky loser
- Alt = Alternate
- ITF = ITF entry
- PR = Protected ranking
- SR = Special ranking
- SE = Special exempt
- JE = Junior exempt
- JR = Junior Accelerator Programme entrant
- CO = College Accelerator Programme entrant
- NG = Next Gen Accelerator Program entrant
- w/o = Walkover
- r = Retired
- d = Defaulted

=== Finals ===
Semifinals
(Belgium) Kirsten Flipkens	5	4
7	(Romania) Simona Halep	7	6
(Italy) Alberta Brianti	w/o
(Russia) Dinara Safina

Final
7	(Romania) Simona Halep	4	3
(Italy) Alberta Brianti	6	6

=== Top half ===
First round
1/WC	(France) A Rezaï	4	6	6
(Netherlands) A Rus	6	4	3
WC	(Morocco) N Lalami	6	7
(Japan) M Doi	2	5
Q	(Spain) S Soler Espinosa	3	3
(Belgium) K Flipkens	6	6
Q	(Poland) U Radwańska	6	6^{8}	4
LL	(Greece) E Daniilidou	2	7	6
4	(Hungary) G Arn	6	1
(Austria) P Mayr-Achleitner	0	0^{r}
(Czech Republic) R Voráčová	7	5	3
Q	(Czech Republic) K Plíšková	6^{5}	7	6
(Russia) N Bratchikova	6	2	3
(Russia) A Kudryavtseva	2	6	6
(Belarus) A Yakimova	2	0
7	(Romania) S Halep	6	6

Second round
1/WC	(France) A Rezaï	6	6^{5}	4
WC	(Morocco) N Lalami	2	7	6
(Belgium) K Flipkens	6	7
LL	(Greece) E Daniilidou	4	5
4	(Hungary) G Arn	6	6
Q	(Czech Republic) K Plíšková	4	4
(Russia) A Kudryavtseva	2	4
7	(Romania) S Halep	6	6

Quarterfinals
WC	(Morocco) N Lalami	0	1
(Belgium) K Flipkens	6	6
4	(Hungary) G Arn	2	1
7	(Romania) S Halep	6	6

Semifinals
(Belgium) K Flipkens	5	4
7	(Romania) S Halep	7	6

=== Bottom half ===
First round
5	(Germany) A Kerber	1	6	3
(Russia) K Pervak	6	4	6
(Italy) A Brianti	7	6
(Spain) L Pous Tió	5	2
(South Africa) C Scheepers	7	6^{1}	2
(Slovenia) P Hercog	6^{6}	7	6
(United States) M Oudin	4	6	6
3	(Spain) L Domínguez Lino	6	1	2
8	(France) A Cornet	6	6
(Czech Republic) A Hlaváčková	3	3
(Russia) D Safina	6	6
(United States) J Craybas	1	0
(Russia) A Pivovarova	6	7
WC	(Morocco) FZ El Allami	3	6^{2}
Q	(Romania) I-C Begu	3	2
2	(Kazakhstan) Y Shvedova	6	6

Second round
(Russia) K Pervak	5	2
(Italy) A Brianti	7	6
(Slovenia) P Hercog
(United States) M Oudin	w/o
8	(France) A Cornet	1	3
(Russia) D Safina	6	6
(Russia) A Pivovarova	6	7
2	(Kazakhstan) Y Shvedova	2	6^{5}

Quarterfinals
(Italy) A Brianti	7	5	6
(United States) M Oudin	5	7	0
(Russia) D Safina	6	2	6
(Russia) A Pivovarova	4	6	4

Semifinals
(Italy) A Brianti	w/o
(Russia) D Safina
