= 2009 Fed Cup Europe/Africa Zone =

Subsection of tennis competition

The Europe/Africa Zone was one of three zones of regional competition in the 2009 Fed Cup.

== Group I ==
- Venue: Coral Tennis Club, Tallinn, Estonia (indoor hard)
- Date: 4–7 February

The fifteen teams were divided into three pools of four teams and one pool of three. The four pool winners took part in play-offs to determine the two nations advancing to the World Group II play-offs. The nations finishing last in their pools took part in play-offs, with the two losing nations being relegated to Group II in 2010.

=== Pools ===
	Pool A	GBR	HUN	NED	LUX
1	Great Britain (3–0)		3–0	3–0	3–0
2	Hungary (2–1)	0–3		2–1	2–1
3	Netherlands (1–2)	0–3	1–2		3–0
4	Luxembourg (0–3)	0–3	1–2	0–3	

	Pool B	POL	SWE	ROM	BIH
1	Poland (3–0)		3–0	2–1	2–1
2	Sweden (2–1)	0–3		3–0	3–0
3	Romania (1–2)	1–2	0–3		3–0
4	Bosnia and Herzegovina (0–3)	1–2	0–3	0–3	

	Pool C	BLR	DEN	SLO	AUT
1	Belarus (3–0)		2–1	3–0	3–0
2	Denmark (2–1)	1–2		2–1	2–1
3	Slovenia (1–2)	0–3	1–2		2–1
4	Austria (0–3)	0–3	1–2	1–2	

	Pool D	EST	CRO	BUL
1	Estonia (2–0)		2–1	3–0
2	Croatia (1–1)	1–2		2–1
3	Bulgaria (0–2)	0–3	1–2	

=== Play-offs ===
Placing	A Team	Score	B/C Team
Promotion	Great Britain	1–2	Poland
5th–8th	Hungary	1–2	Sweden
9th	Netherlands	N/A	
9th		N/A	Slovenia
Relegation	Luxembourg	1–2	Austria

Placing	B/C Team	Score	D Team
Promotion	Belarus	0–2	Estonia
5th–8th	Denmark	0–2	Croatia
9th	Romania	N/A	
Relegation	Bosnia and Herzegovina	2–1	Bulgaria

- Poland and Estonia advanced to the 2009 World Group II play-offs.
- Luxembourg and Bulgaria were relegated to Group II for 2010.

== Group II ==
- Venue: Attaleya Shine Tennis Club, Antalya, Turkey (outdoor hard)
- Date: 21–25 April

The six teams were divided into two pool of three teams each. The winner of each pool played the runner-up of the other pool to determine which two nations will be promoted to Group I in 2010. The bottom nation in each pool will be relegated to Europe/Africa Zone Group III in 2010.

=== Pools ===
	Pool A	LAT	POR	MAR
1	Latvia (2–0)		2–1	3–0
2	Portugal (1–1)	1–2		3–0
3	Morocco (0–2)	0–3	0–3	

	Pool B	RSA	GEO	TUR
1	South Africa (2–0)		2–1	2–1
2	Georgia (1–1)	1–2		3–0
3	Turkey (0–2)	1–2	0–3	

=== Play-offs ===
Placing	A Team	Score	B Team
Promotion	Latvia	3–0	Georgia
Promotion	Portugal	2–0	South Africa

- Latvia and Portugal advanced to Group I for 2010.
- Morocco and Turkey were relegated to Group III for 2010.

== Group III ==
- Venue: Marsa Sports Club, Marsa, Malta (outdoor hard)
- Date: 21–25 April

The eleven teams were divided into one pool of five teams and one pool of six. The top two teams of each pool progressed to Group II for 2010.

=== Pools ===
	Pool A	GRE	FIN	IRE	MLT	ALG
1	Greece (4–0)		3–0	3–0	2–1	3–0
2	Finland (3–1)	0–3		2–1	3–0	3–0
3	Ireland (2–2)	0–3	1–2		2–1	3–0
4	Malta (1–3)	1–2	0–3	1–2		2–1
5	Algeria (0–4)	0–3	0–3	0–3	1–2	

	Pool B	ARM	NOR	LIE	EGY	MDA	ISL
1	Armenia (5–0)		3–0	2–1	3–0	3–0	3–0
2	Norway (4–1)	0–3		2–1	3–0	3–0	3–0
3	Liechtenstein (3–2)	1–2	1–2		3–0	3–0	3–0
4	Egypt (2–3)	0–3	0–3	0–3		2–1	3–0
5	Moldova (1–4)	0–3	0–3	0–3	1–2		3–0
6	Iceland (0–5)	0–3	0–3	0–3	0–3	0–3	

- Greece and Armenia advanced to Group II for 2010.
- Finland and Norway were also promoted to Group II for 2010 as group runners-up.

== See also ==
- Fed Cup structure
