= Chayenne Ewijk =

Dutch tennis player

- Country (sports): Netherlands
- Born: 17 August 1988 (age 38) Barendrecht
- Plays: Right (two-handed backhand)
- Prize money: $71,215

Singles
- Career record: 194–114
- Career titles: 7 ITF
- Highest ranking: No. 229 (23 February 2009)

Doubles
- Career record: 128–69
- Career titles: 19 ITF
- Highest ranking: No. 216 (20 October 2008)

Team competitions
- Fed Cup: 2–2

Chayenne Ewijk (born 17 August 1988) is a Dutch former professional tennis player.

Ewijk has won seven singles and 19 doubles titles on the ITF Women's Circuit. On 23 February 2009, she reached her best singles ranking of world No. 229. On 20 October 2008, she peaked at No. 216 in the WTA doubles rankings.

Partnering with Anastasiya Yakimova, Ewijk won her first $50k title in October 2008 at the ITF Jounieh Open, defeating Carmen Klaschka and Laura Siegemund in the final.

Playing for the Netherlands in the Fed Cup, Ewijk has a win–loss record of 2–2.

== ITF Circuit finals ==
=== Singles (7–7) ===
Legend $25,000 tournaments $15,000 tournaments $10,000 tournaments	Finals by surface Hard (3–5) Clay (4–2)

Outcome	No.	Date	Location	Surface	Opponent	Score
Runner-up	1.	23 October 2005	Porto Santo Island, Portugal	Hard	(Portugal) Magali de Lattre	5–7, 1–6
Runner-up	2.	19 February 2006	Albufeira, Portugal	Hard	(Romania) Sorana Cîrstea	0–6, 5–7
Runner-up	3.	22 July 2007	Craiova, Romania	Clay	(Argentina) Mailen Auroux	7–6^{(3)}, 2–6, 2–6
Winner	1.	16 March 2008	Las Palmas, Spain	Hard	(Belgium) Kirsten Flipkens	4–6, 7–6^{(4)}, 7–6^{(4)}
Winner	2.	12 April 2008	Telde, Spain	Clay	(Germany) Dominice Ripoll	6–2, 7–5
Runner-up	4.	28 June 2008	Getxo, Spain	Clay	(Spain) Estrella Cabeza Candela	4–6, 4–6
Runner-up	5.	6 December 2009	Poza Rica, Mexico	Hard	(France) Claire de Gubernatis	3–6, 2–6
Winner	3.	30 August 2015	Rotterdam, Netherlands	Clay	(Greece) Valentini Grammatikopoulou	7–6^{(3)}, 6–3
Winner	4.	26 September 2015	Solo, Indonesia	Hard	(Chinese Taipei) Lee Pei-chi	6–4, 5–7, 6–2
Runner-up	6.	3 October 2015	Jakarta, Indonesia	Hard	(Japan) Kanami Tsuji	3–6, 4–6
Winner	5.	12 June 2016	Réunion, France	Hard	(France) Estelle Cascino	1–6, 6–4, 6–2
Winner	6.	11 September 2016	Alphen aan den Rijn, Netherlands	Clay	(Netherlands) Suzan Lamens	7–5, 7–5
Winner	7.	19 August 2017	Las Palmas, Spain	Clay	(Sweden) Fanny Östlund	4–6, 6–4, 6–2
Runner-up	7.	4 November 2017	Pétange, Luxembourg	Hard (i)	(Belarus) Sviatlana Pirazhenka	2–6, 6–4, 0–6

=== Doubles (19–7) ===
Legend $25,000 tournaments $15,000 tournaments $10,000 tournaments	Finals by surface Hard (11–4) Clay (7–3) Carpet (1–0)

Outcome	No.	Date	Tournament	Surface	Partner	Opponents	Score
Winner	1.	7 February 2006	Vale do Lobo, Portugal	Hard	(France) Émilie Bacquet	(Romania) Liana Ungur (Turkey) İpek Şenoğlu	6–3, 6–3
Winner	2.	13 February 2006	Albufeira, Portugal	Hard	(France) Émilie Bacquet	(Slovenia) Polona Reberšak (Romania) Sorana Cîrstea	6–4, 6–4
Winner	3.	26 November 2007	La Vall d'Uixó, Spain	Clay	(Netherlands) Marlot Meddens	(United States) Alexis Prousis (Spain) Lucía Sainz	6–4, 6–4
Winner	4.	26 January 2008	Kaarst, Germany	Carpet (i)	(Netherlands) Daniëlle Harmsen	(Serbia) Neda Kozić (Russia) Anastasia Poltoratskaya	6–4, 6–1
Winner	5.	24 February 2008	Portimão, Portugal	Hard	(France) Émilie Bacquet	(Russia) Elena Chalova (Armenia) Liudmila Nikoyan	w/o
Winner	6.	7 April 2008	Telde, Spain	Clay	(Germany) Dominice Ripoll	(France) Anne-Valerie Evain (Slovenia) Petra Pajalič	6–2, 3–6, [10–4]
Runner-up	1.	21 April 2008	Namangan, Uzbekistan	Hard	(Russia) Marina Melnikova	(Russia) Vasilisa Davydova (Russia) Maria Zharkova	6–3, 5–7, [6–10]
Winner	7.	18 August 2008	Enschede, Netherlands	Clay	(Netherlands) Pauline Wong	(Canada) Daniela Covello (Netherlands) Bo Verhulsdonk	6–1, 6–4
Winner	8.	6 October 2008	Jounieh, Lebanon	Clay	(Belarus) Anastasiya Yakimova	(Germany) Carmen Klaschka (Germany) Laura Siegemund	7–5, 7–5
Runner-up	2.	13 September 2009	Alphen aan den Rijn, Netherlands	Clay	(Netherlands) Marlot Meddens	(Ukraine) Lyudmyla Kichenok (Ukraine) Nadiia Kichenok	2–6, 6–4, [8–10]
Winner	9.	21 September 2009	Telavi, Georgia	Clay	(Netherlands) Marlot Meddens	(Georgia (country)) Tatia Mikadze (Georgia (country)) Manana Shapakidze	6–2, 6–4
Runner-up	3.	10 August 2015	Las Palmas, Spain	Clay	(Netherlands) Rosalie van der Hoek	(Poland) Olga Brózda (Ukraine) Anastasiya Shoshyna	7–6^{(8)}, 3–6, [10–7]
Winner	10.	10 August 2015	Las Palmas, Spain	Clay	(Netherlands) Rosalie van der Hoek	(Spain) Marta González Encinas (Spain) Estela Pérez Somarriba	7–6^{(5)}, 6–0
Winner	11.	20 March 2016	Nanjing, China	Hard	(Netherlands) Rosalie van der Hoek	(Russia) Kseniia Bekker (Belarus) Lidziya Marozava	6–4, 6–2
Winner	12.	16 April 2016	Dijon, France	Hard	(Netherlands) Rosalie van der Hoek	(France) Manon Peral (France) Maud Vigne	6–2, 6–0
Runner-up	4.	18 June 2016	Grand-Baie, Mauritius	Hard	(Netherlands) Rosalie van der Hoek	(India) Kyra Shroff (India) Dhruthi Tatachar Venugopal	1–6, 1–6
Winner	13.	26 June 2016	Grand-Baie, Mauritius	Hard	(Netherlands) Rosalie van der Hoek	(India) Kyra Shroff (India) Dhruthi Tatachar Venugopal	6–3, 6–3
Winner	14.	24 July 2016	Don Benito, Spain	Hard	(Netherlands) Rosalie van der Hoek	(Spain) Arabela Fernández Rabener (Russia) Yana Sizikova	7–5, 6–2
Runner-up	5.	30 July 2016	Savitaipale, Finland	Hard	(Netherlands) Rosalie van der Hoek	(Russia) Kseniia Bekker (Italy) Georgia Brescia	6–4, 4–6, [5–10]
Runner-up	6.	10 September 2016	Alphen aan den Rijn, Netherlands	Clay	(Netherlands) Rosalie van der Hoek	(Netherlands) Nina Kruijer (Netherlands) Suzan Lamens	0–6, 6–3, [5–10]
Winner	15.	16 September 2016	Pétange, Luxembourg	Hard (i)	(Netherlands) Rosalie van der Hoek	(Poland) Justyna Jegiołka (Belgium) Magali Kempen	7–6^{(6)}, 6–3
Winner	16.	14 October 2016	Lagos, Nigeria	Hard	(Netherlands) Rosalie van der Hoek	(Greece) Valentini Grammatikopoulou (India) Prarthana Thombare	6–3, 7–5
Winner	17.	4 November 2016	Oslo, Norway	Hard (i)	(Netherlands) Rosalie van der Hoek	(Denmark) Karen Barritza (Slovakia) Michaela Hončová	6–4, 6–4
Runner-up	7.	27 January 2017	Saint Martin, France (Guadeloupe)	Hard	(Netherlands) Rosalie van der Hoek	(United States) Desirae Krawczyk (Mexico) Giuliana Olmos	1–6, 1–6
Winner	18.	7 October 2017	Telde, Spain	Clay	(Switzerland) Lisa Sabino	(Peru) Anastasia Iamachkine (Spain) Ana Lantigua de la Nuez	6–1, 6–1
Winner	19.	5 November 2017	Pétange, Luxembourg	Hard (i)	(Netherlands) Rosalie van der Hoek	(France) Priscilla Heise (Belgium) Déborah Kerfs	6–2, 4–6, [10–8]

== Fed Cup participation ==
=== Singles ===
Edition	Round	Date	Location	Against	Surface	Opponent	W/L	Score
2010 Fed Cup	Europe/Africa Zone	3 February 2010	Lisbon, Portugal	Bulgaria	Hard (i)	(Bulgaria) Dia Evtimova	W	6–1, 6–7^{(6)}, 6–2
2010 Fed Cup	Europe/Africa Zone	4 February 2010	Lisbon, Portugal	Slovenia	Hard (i)	(Slovenia) Katarina Srebotnik	L	6–4, 3–6, 4–6
2010 Fed Cup	Europe/Africa Zone	5 February 2010	Lisbon, Portugal	Israel	Hard (i)	(Israel) Julia Glushko	W	6–4, 6–7^{(3)}, 6–3
2010 Fed Cup	Europe/Africa Zone	6 February 2010	Lisbon, Portugal	(United Kingdom) Great Britain	Hard (i)	(United Kingdom) Anne Keothavong	L	6–7^{(5)}, 3–6
