= 2011 Fed Cup Europe/Africa Zone Group II – Pool A =

International tennis competition

Group A of the 2011 Fed Cup Europe/Africa Zone Group II was one of four pools in the Europe/Africa zone of the 2011 Fed Cup. Three teams competed in a round robin competition, with the top team and the bottom team proceeding to their respective sections of the play-offs: the top teams played for advancement to Group I, while the bottom team faced potential relegation to Group III.

		(Finland) FIN	(Morocco) MAR	(Portugal) POR	RR; W–L	Set; W–L	Game; W–L	Standings
49	Finland		2–1	1–2	1–1	6–8	71–58	2
64	Morocco	1–2		1–2	0–2	6–9	50–81	3
68	Portugal	2–1	2–1		2–0	10–5	81–74	1

== Finland vs. Morocco ==
Finland
2
Smash Tennis Academy, Cairo, Egypt
May 4, 2011
Red clay (outdoors)

Morocco
1

			1	2	3
1	(Finland) (Morocco)	Piia Suomalainen; Nadia Lalami	6^{4} 7^{7}	6; 0	6; 0
2	(Finland) (Morocco)	Emma Laine; Fatima El Allami	6; 2	6; 0
3	(Finland) (Morocco)	Emma Laine / Piia Suomalainen; Lina Bennani / Fatima El Allami	6^{1} 7	3; 6

== Morocco vs. Portugal ==
Morocco
1
Smash Tennis Academy, Cairo, Egypt
May 5, 2011
Red clay (outdoors)

Portugal
2

			1	2	3
1	(Morocco) (Portugal)	Nadia Lalami; Maria João Köhler	2; 6	7; 5	6; 3
2	(Morocco) (Portugal)	Fatima El Allami; Michelle Larcher de Brito	6; 4	3; 6	2; 6
3	(Morocco) (Portugal)	Fatima El Allami / Nadia Lalami; Maria João Köhler / Michelle Larcher de Brito	3; 6	2; 6

== Finland vs. Portugal ==
Finland
1
Smash Tennis Academy, Cairo, Egypt
May 6, 2011
Red clay (outdoors)

Portugal
2

			1	2	3
1	(Finland) (Portugal)	Piia Suomalainen; Maria João Köhler	6; 2	5; 7	7; 5
2	(Finland) (Portugal)	Emma Laine; Michelle Larcher de Brito	6^{4} 7^{7}	3; 6
3	(Finland) (Portugal)	Emma Laine / Piia Suomalainen; Maria João Köhler / Michelle Larcher de Brito	3; 6	2; 6
