= Catarina Ferreira =

Portuguese tennis player (born 1984)

- Country (sports): Portugal
- Born: 9 February 1984 (age 41) Lisbon
- Height: 1.62 m (5 ft 4 in)
- Turned pro: 2002
- Retired: 2010
- Plays: Right handed (two-handed backhand)
- Prize money: US$ 13,294

Singles
- Career record: 69–104
- Career titles: 0
- Highest ranking: No. 456 (25 February 2008)

Doubles
- Career record: 55–68
- Career titles: 0 WTA, 5 ITF
- Highest ranking: No. 378 (28 September 1998)

Catarina Ferreira (born 9 February 1984) is a Portuguese former professional tennis player. She reached career-high WTA rankings of 456 in singles and 401 in doubles.

== ITF Circuit finals ==
$100,000 tournaments
$75,000 tournaments
$50,000 tournaments
$25,000 tournaments
$10,000 tournaments

=== Singles (0–1) ===
Outcome	No.	Date	Tournament	Surface	Opponent	Score
Runner-up	1.	1 October 2007	Porto, Portugal	Clay	(Czech Republic) Kateřina Vaňková	3–6, 2–6

=== Doubles (5–4) ===
Outcome	No.	Date	Tournament	Surface	Partner	Opponents	Score
Winner	1.	24 July 2006	Les Contamines-Montjoie, France	Hard	(Germany) Laura Siegemund	(Australia) Christina Horiatopoulos (Belgium) Caroline Maes	6–4, 2–6, 7–5
Winner	2.	27 May 2007	Braga, Portugal	Clay	(Portugal) Kátia Rodrigues	(Belgium) Ineke Mergaert (Belgium) Daphne Staelens	3–6, 7–5, 7–6
Runner-up	3.	12 September 2007	Lleida, Spain	Clay	(Spain) Sheila Solsona-Carcasona	(Romania) Mădălina Gojnea (Poland) Sylwia Zagórska	6–7, 1–6
Runner-up	4.	28 April 2008	Bournemouth, Great Britain	Clay	(United Kingdom) Amy Sargeant	(United Kingdom) Yasmin Clarke (United Kingdom) Elizabeth Thomas	2–6, 6–4, [10–12]
Runner-up	5.	14 July 2008	Casablanca, Morocco	Clay	(Spain) Melissa Cabrera-Handt	(Italy) Benedetta Davato (Switzerland) Lisa Sabino	3–6, 4–6
Winner	6.	15 September 2008	Casale Monferrato, Italy	Clay	(Georgia (country)) Oksana Kalashnikova	(Switzerland) Nicole Riner (Switzerland) Amra Sadiković	7–5, 7–6
Winner	7.	6 October 2008	Espinho, Portugal	Clay	(Morocco) Fatima El Allami	(Morocco) Lina Bennani (Poland) Veronika Domagala	6–1, 6–3
Runner-up	8.	13 October 2008	Lisbon, Portugal	Clay	(Morocco) Fatima El Allami	(Morocco) Lina Bennani (Poland) Veronika Domagala	5–7, 6–4, [9–11]
Winner	9.	10 November 2008	Mallorca, Spain	Clay	(United States) Ashley Weinhold	(Spain) Lucía Sainz (Spain) Cristina Sanchez-Quintanar	6–3, 5–7, [10–8]
