= 2011 Fed Cup Europe/Africa Zone Group II – Pool B =

Group B of the 2011 Fed Cup Europe/Africa Zone Group II was one of four pools in the Europe/Africa zone of the 2011 Fed Cup. Three teams competed in a round robin competition, with the top team and the bottom team proceeding to their respective sections of the play-offs: the top teams played for advancement to Group I, while the bottom team faced potential relegation to Group III.

		(Georgia (country)) GEO	(Armenia) ARM	(Bosnia and Herzegovina) BIH	(Turkey) TUR	RR; W–L	Set; W–L	Game; W–L	Standings
56	Georgia		2–1	1–2	3–0	2–1	10–8	73–70	2
62	Armenia	1–2		0–3	0–3	0–3	3–16	54–108	4
66	Bosnia and Herzegovina	2–1	3–0		3–0	3–0	17–4	118–79	1
69	Turkey	0–3	3–0	0–3		1–2	8–10	90–105	3

== Georgia vs. Armenia ==
Georgia
2
Smash Tennis Academy, Cairo, Egypt
4 May 2011
Red clay (outdoors)

Armenia
1

			1	2	3
1	(Georgia (country)) (Armenia)	Tatia Mikadze; Ofelya Poghosyan	6; 1	6; 1
2	(Georgia (country)) (Armenia)	Sofia Shapatava; Ani Amiraghyan	4; 6	4; 6
3	(Georgia (country)) (Armenia)	Ekaterine Gorgodze / Tatia Mikadze; Ani Amiraghyan / Ofelya Poghosyan	6; 2	6; 1

== Bosnia and Herzegovina vs. Turkey ==
Bosnia and Herzegovina
3
Smash Tennis Academy, Cairo, Egypt
4 May 2011
Red clay (outdoors)

Turkey
0

			1	2	3
1	(Bosnia and Herzegovina) (Turkey)	Mervana Jugić-Salkić; Pemra Özgen	7^{7} 6^{2}	6; 2
2	(Bosnia and Herzegovina) (Turkey)	Jasmina Tinjić; Çağla Büyükakçay	7^{7} 6^{4}	4; 6	7; 5
3	(Bosnia and Herzegovina) (Turkey)	Ema Burgić / Mervana Jugić-Salkić; İpek Şenoğlu / Melis Sezer	6; 4	7^{7} 6^{5}

== Georgia vs. Bosnia and Herzegovina ==
Georgia
1
Smash Tennis Academy, Cairo, Egypt
5 May 2011
Red clay (outdoors)

Bosnia and Herzegovina
2

			1	2	3
1	(Georgia (country)) (Bosnia and Herzegovina)	Ekaterine Gorgodze; Mervana Jugić-Salkić	2; 6	2; 6
2	(Georgia (country)) (Bosnia and Herzegovina)	Tatia Mikadze; Jasmina Tinjić	2; 6	0; 6
3	(Georgia (country)) (Bosnia and Herzegovina)	Tatia Mikadze / Sofia Shapatava; Ema Burgić / Jasmina Kajtazovič	4; 6	6; 1	6; 3

== Armenia vs. Turkey ==
Armenia
0
Smash Tennis Academy, Cairo, Egypt
5 May 2011
Red clay (outdoors)

Turkey
3

			1	2	3
1	(Armenia) (Turkey)	Anna Movsisyan; Pemra Özgen	2; 6	3; 6
2	(Armenia) (Turkey)	Ani Amiraghyan; Çağla Büyükakçay	3; 6	2; 6
3	(Armenia) (Turkey)	Ani Amiraghyan / Anna Movsisyan; İpek Şenoğlu / Melis Sezer	1; 6	4; 6

== Georgia vs. Turkey ==
Georgia
3
Smash Tennis Academy, Cairo, Egypt
6 May 2011
Red clay (outdoors)

Turkey
0

			1	2	3
1	(Georgia (country)) (Turkey)	Tatia Mikadze; Pemra Özgen	1; 6	6; 1	7; 5
2	(Georgia (country)) (Turkey)	Sofia Shapatava; Çağla Büyükakçay	6; 3	6; 2
3	(Georgia (country)) (Turkey)	Tatia Mikadze / Sofia Shapatava; Çağla Büyükakçay / İpek Şenoğlu	3; 2			retired

== Armenia vs. Bosnia and Herzegovina ==
Armenia
0
Smash Tennis Academy, Cairo, Egypt
6 May 2011
Red clay (outdoors)

Bosnia and Herzegovina
3

			1	2	3
1	(Armenia) (Bosnia and Herzegovina)	Nune Khachatryan; Jasmina Kajtazovič	4; 6	2; 6
2	(Armenia) (Bosnia and Herzegovina)	Ani Amiraghyan; Ema Burgić	4; 6	6; 4	4; 6
3	(Armenia) (Bosnia and Herzegovina)	Anna Movsisyan / Ofelya Poghosyan; Ema Burgić / Jasmina Kajtazovič	1; 6	1; 6
