= 2010 Fed Cup Europe/Africa Zone Group III – Pool A =

Group A of the 2010 Fed Cup Europe/Africa Zone Group III was one of two pools in the Europe/Africa Zone Group III of the 2010 Fed Cup. Three teams competed in a round robin competition, with the top two teams and the bottom team proceeding to their respective sections of the play-offs: the top teams played for advancement to the Group II.

		(Turkey) TUR	(Egypt) EGY	(Moldova) MDA	RR; W–L	Set; W–L	Game; W–L	Standings
71	Turkey		3–0	3–0	2–0	6–1	75–29	1
73	Egypt	0–3		3–0	1–1	7–6	57–59	2
83	Moldova	0–3	0–3		0–2	0–12	30–74	3

== Turkey vs. Egypt ==
Turkey
3
Smash Tennis Academy, Cairo, Egypt
21 April 2010
Clay (outdoors)

Egypt
0

			1	2	3
1	(Turkey) (Egypt)	Pemra Özgen; Ola Abou Zekry	7; 5	6; 1
2	(Turkey) (Egypt)	Çağla Büyükakçay; Menna El Nagdy	6; 1	6; 0
3	(Turkey) (Egypt)	Pemra Özgen / İpek Şenoğlu; Ola Abou Zekry / Magy Aziz	6; 0	1; 6	7^{8} 6^{6}

== Turkey vs. Moldova ==
Turkey
3
Smash Tennis Academy, Cairo, Egypt
22 April 2010
Clay (outdoors)

Moldova
0

			1	2	3
1	(Turkey) (Moldova)	Pemra Özgen; Olga Terteac	6; 4	6; 2
2	(Turkey) (Moldova)	Çağla Büyükakçay; Julia Helbet	6; 0	6; 1
3	(Turkey) (Moldova)	Çağla Büyükakçay / İpek Şenoğlu; Julia Helbet / Alexandra Perper	6; 3	6; 0

== Egypt vs. Moldova ==
Egypt
3
Smash Tennis Academy, Cairo, Egypt
23 April 2010
Clay (outdoors)

Moldova
0

			1	2	3
1	(Egypt) (Moldova)	Magy Aziz; Alexandra Perper	7; 5	6; 2
2	(Egypt) (Moldova)	Ola Abou Zekry; Julia Helbet	7^{7} 6^{5}	6; 3
3	(Egypt) (Moldova)	Menna El Nagdy / Rana Sherif Ahmed; Alina Soltanici / Olga Terteac	6; 3	6; 1

== See also ==
- Fed Cup structure
