= 2011 Grand Prix SAR La Princesse Lalla Meryem =

- Date: 18 – 24 April
- Edition: 11th
- Surface: Clay / outdoor
- Location: Fes, Morocco

Champions

Singles
- (Italy) Alberta Brianti

Doubles
- (Czech Republic) Andrea Hlaváčková / (Czech Republic) Renata Voráčová
- Morocco Open

The 2011 Grand Prix SAR La Princesse Lalla Meryem was a professional women's tennis tournament played on outdoor clay courts. It was the eleventh edition of the tournament which was part of the 2011 WTA Tour. It took place in Fes, Morocco between 18 and 24 April 2011.

== WTA entrants ==
=== Seeds ===
| Country | Player | Rank^{1} | Seed |
|---|---|---|---|
| FRA | Aravane Rezaï | 24 | 1 |
| KAZ | Yaroslava Shvedova | 46 | 2 |
| ESP | Lourdes Domínguez Lino | 45 | 3 |
| HUN | Gréta Arn | 52 | 4 |
| GER | Angelique Kerber | 60 | 5 |
| AUS | Jelena Dokić | 63 | 6 |
| ROU | Simona Halep | 66 | 7 |
| FRA | Alizé Cornet | 67 | 8 |

- Rankings are as of April 11, 2011.

=== Other entrants ===
The following players received wildcards into the singles main draw:

- (Morocco) Fatima Zahrae El Allami
- (Morocco) Nadia Lalami
- (France) Aravane Rezaï

The following players received entry from the qualifying draw:

- (Romania) Irina-Camelia Begu
- (Spain) Silvia Soler Espinosa
- (Czech Republic) Kristýna Plíšková
- (Poland) Urszula Radwańska

The following players received entry from a Lucky loser spot:

- (Greece) Eleni Daniilidou

=== Withdrawals ===
- (Australia) Jelena Dokić (illness)

== Champions ==
=== Singles ===
(Italy) Alberta Brianti def. (Romania) Simona Halep, 6–4, 6–3

- It was Brianti's first career title.

=== Doubles ===
(Czech Republic) Andrea Hlaváčková / (Czech Republic) Renata Voráčová def. (Russia) Nina Bratchikova / (Austria) Sandra Klemenschits, 6–3, 6–4
