= Maria Zharkova =

Russian tennis player

- Full name: Maria Sergeevna Zharkova
- Country (sports): Russia
- Born: 7 May 1988 (age 38) Moscow, Russia
- Height: 1.72 m (5 ft 8 in)
- Plays: Right-handed
- Prize money: $32,883

Singles
- Career record: 84–90
- Career titles: 0
- Highest ranking: No. 490 (4 April 2011)

Doubles
- Career record: 98–70
- Career titles: 7 ITF
- Highest ranking: No. 335 (12 May 2008)

Maria Sergeevna Zharkova (born 7 May 1988) is a Russian former professional tennis player.

Born in Moscow, Zharkova played on tour from 2006 to 2012, reaching a career-high singles ranking of 490 in the world. At the 2011 Baku Cup, she won through to the second qualifying round and made her WTA Tour main-draw debut in the doubles. She won seven doubles titles while competing on the ITF Women's Circuit.

== ITF finals ==
Legend
$25,000 tournaments
$10,000 tournaments

=== Doubles: 14 (7–7) ===
Outcome	No.	Date	Tournament	Surface	Partner	Opponents	Score
Winner	1.	12 August 2007	Moscow, Russia	Clay	(Russia) Tatiana Kotelnikova	(Russia) Anna Lapushchenkova (Russia) Vasilisa Davydova	6–4, 3–6, 6–3
Winner	2.	27 April 2008	Namangan, Uzbekistan	Hard	(Russia) Vasilisa Davydova	(Russia) Marina Melnikova (Netherlands) Chayenne Ewijk	3–6, 7–5, [10–6]
Runner-up	1.	5 April 2009	Antalya, Turkey	Hard	(Belarus) Ima Bohush	(Georgia (country)) Sofia Kvatsabaia (Russia) Avgusta Tsybysheva	4–6, 6–4, [8–10]
Runner-up	2.	17 May 2009	Saint Petersburg, Russia	Hard	(Russia) Avgusta Tsybysheva	(Russia) Yuliya Kalabina (Russia) Marta Sirotkina	1–6, 2–6
Winner	3.	31 May 2009	Kharkiv, Ukraine	Clay	(Ukraine) Kateryna Avdiyenko	(Ukraine) Elina Svitolina (Ukraine) Kateryna Kozlova	6–7^{(3)}, 6–3, [11–9]
Runner-up	3.	13 September 2009	Saint Petersburg 2, Russia	Clay	(Ukraine) Anastasiya Lytovchenko	(Russia) Yanina Darishina (Russia) Ekaterina Prozorova	6–7^{(7)}, 6–3, [7–10]
Winner	4.	15 April 2010	Astana, Kazakhstan	Hard (i)	(Russia) Eugeniya Pashkova	(Russia) Alexandra Artamonova (Ukraine) Khristina Kazimova	6–0, 6–1
Winner	5.	22 April 2010	Almaty, Kazakhstan	Hard (i)	(Russia) Eugeniya Pashkova	(Kyrgyzstan) Ksenia Palkina (Turkmenistan) Anastasiya Prenko	3–6, 7–6^{(9)}, [10–7]
Winner	6.	21 August 2010	Saint Petersburg, Russia	Clay	(Russia) Eugeniya Pashkova	(Ukraine) Valentyna Ivakhnenko (Ukraine) Mariya Malkhasyan	6–4, 5–7, 6–4
Winner	7.	7 November 2010	Minsk, Belarus	Carpet (i)	(Russia) Eugeniya Pashkova	(Ukraine) Oksana Pavlova (Russia) Ekaterina Yashina	5–7, 7–5, 6–4
Runner-up	4.	12 March 2011	Antalya 5, Turkey	Clay	(Russia) Eugeniya Pashkova	(Netherlands) Daniëlle Harmsen (Netherlands) Bibiane Schoofs	3–6, 5–7
Runner-up	5.	24 April 2011	Antalya 11, Turkey	Hard	(Russia) Marta Sirotkina	(Romania) Laura Ioana Andrei (Poland) Sylwia Zagórska	1–6, 6–7^{(0)}
Runner-up	6.	1 May 2011	Antalya 12, Turkey	Clay	(Russia) Alexandra Romanova	(Romania) Laura Ioana Andrei (Georgia (country)) Ekaterine Gorgodze	1–6, 5–7
Runner-up	7.	21 August 2011	Saint Petersburg, Russia	Clay	(Russia) Tatiana Kotelnikova	(Russia) Polina Vinogradova (Russia) Anastasia Frolova	2–6, 2–6
