= Nina Khrisanova =

Russian tennis player

Nina Khrisanova (born December 9, 1994) is a Russian tennis player. Nina gained entry to the main draw of the 2011 Baku Cup, an event of the 2011 WTA Tour, as a wildcard and was defeated in the first-round by Tatia Mikadze 6–0, 6–0. Nina's highest career singles ranking is 1212.
