= 2011 Baku Cup =

- Date: 18–24 July
- Edition: 1st
- Category: WTA International
- Draw: 32S / 16D
- Surface: Hard / outdoor
- Location: Baku, Azerbaijan

Champions

Singles
- (Russia) Vera Zvonareva

Doubles
- (Ukraine) Mariya Koryttseva / (Belarus) Tatiana Poutchek
- Baku Cup

The 2011 Baku Cup was a professional women's tennis tournament played on hard courts. It was the first edition of the Baku Cup which was part of the 2011 WTA Tour. It took place in Baku, Azerbaijan between 18 July and 24 July 2011. First-seeded Vera Zvonareva won the singles title.

== Finals ==
=== Singles ===
(Russia) Vera Zvonareva defeated (Russia) Ksenia Pervak, 6–1, 6–4.

- It was Zvonareva's second title of the year and 12th of her career.

=== Doubles ===
(Ukraine) Mariya Koryttseva / (Belarus) Tatiana Poutchek defeated (Romania) Monica Niculescu / (Kazakhstan) Galina Voskoboeva, 6–3, 2–6, [10–8].

== WTA entrants ==
=== Seeds ===
Country	Player	Rank	Seed
RUS	Vera Zvonareva	3	1
RUS	Anastasia Pavlyuchenkova	13	2
RUS	Elena Vesnina	33	3
RUS	Ekaterina Makarova	40	4
ROU	Monica Niculescu	52	5
GBR	Elena Baltacha	58	6
RUS	Ksenia Pervak	65	7
RUS	Evgeniya Rodina	77	8

- Rankings are as of July 11, 2011.

=== Other entrants ===
The following players received wildcards into the singles main draw:

- (Uzbekistan) Nigina Abduraimova
- (Azerbaijan) Kamilla Farhad
- (Russia) Nina Khrisanova

The following players received entry from the qualifying draw:

- (Russia) Elena Bovina
- (Russia) Yana Buchina
- (Greece) Eirini Georgatou
- (Russia) Valeria Solovieva

The following players received entry from a lucky loser spot:

- (Georgia (country)) Tatia Mikadze
