= 2010 Fed Cup Europe/Africa Zone =

Subsection of tennis competition

The Europe/Africa Zone was one of three zones of regional competition in the 2010 Fed Cup.

== Group I ==
- Venue: Complexo de Tenis do Jamor, Estádio Nacional, Lisbon, Portugal (indoor hard)
- Date: 3–6 February

The sixteen teams were divided into four pools of four teams. The four pool winners took part in play-offs to determine the two nations advancing to the World Group II Play-offs. The nations finishing last in their pools took part in play-offs, with the two losing nations relegated to Group II in 2011.

=== Pools ===
| | Pool A | SLO | NED | ISR | BUL |
| 1 | Slovenia (2–1) | | 2–1 | 2–1 | 1–2 |
| 2 | Netherlands (2–1) | 1–2 | | 3–0 | 2–1 |
| 3 | Israel (1–2) | 1–2 | 0–3 | | 2–1 |
| 4 | Bulgaria (1–2) | 2–1 | 1–2 | 1–2 | |

| | Pool B | SUI | ROU | CRO | POR |
| 1 | Switzerland (3–0) | | 2–1 | 3–0 | 3–0 |
| 2 | Romania (2–1) | 1–2 | | 2–1 | 2–1 |
| 3 | Croatia (1–2) | 0–3 | 1–2 | | 2–1 |
| 4 | Portugal (0–3) | 0–3 | 1–2 | 1–2 | |

| | Pool C | SWE | HUN | DEN | LAT |
| 1 | Sweden (3–0) | | 3–0 | 2–1 | 2–1 |
| 2 | Hungary (2–1) | 0–3 | | 2–1 | 2–1 |
| 3 | Denmark (1–2) | 1–2 | 1–2 | | 2–1 |
| 4 | Latvia (0–3) | 1–2 | 1–2 | 1–2 | |

| | Pool D | AUT | GBR | BLR | BIH |
| 1 | Austria (3–0) | | 3–0 | 2–1 | 3–0 |
| 2 | Great Britain (2–1) | 0–3 | | 2–1 | 3–0 |
| 3 | Belarus (1–2) | 1–2 | 1–2 | | 3–0 |
| 4 | Bosnia and Herzegovina (0–3) | 0–3 | 0–3 | 0–3 | |

=== Play-offs ===
| Placing | A Team | Score | |
|---|---|---|---|
| Promotional | Slovenia | 3–0 | Switzerland |
| 5th–8th | Netherlands | 2–1 | Great Britain |
| 9th–12th | Israel | 2–1 | Denmark |
| Relegation | Bulgaria | 2–1 | Portugal |

| Placing | | Score | C/D Team |
|---|---|---|---|
| Promotional | Sweden | 3–0 | Austria |
| 5th–8th | Romania | 2–1 | Hungary |
| 9th–12th | Croatia | 1–2 | Belarus |
| Relegation | Latvia | 3–0 | Bosnia and Herzegovina |

- Sweden and Slovenia advanced to the 2010 World Group II Play-offs.
- Portugal and Bosnia and Herzegovina were relegated to Group II for 2011.

== Group II ==
- Venue: Orange Fitness & Tennis Club, Yerevan, Armenia (outdoor clay)
- Date: 28 April – 1 May

The eight teams were divided into two pool of four teams each. The winner of each pool played-off against the runner-up of the other pool to determine which two nations would be promoted to Group I in 2011. The bottom nation in each pool played-off against third place in other pool, with two losing nations relegated to the 2011 Group III.

=== Pools ===
| | Pool A | GRE | LUX | RSA | LIE |
| 1 | Greece (3–0) | | 2–1 | 2–0 | 3–0 |
| 2 | Luxembourg (2–1) | 1–2 | | 2–1 | 2–0 |
| 3 | South Africa (1–2) | 0–2 | 1–2 | | 2–1 |
| 4 | Liechtenstein (0–3) | 0–3 | 0–2 | 1–2 | |

| | Pool B | FIN | GEO | NOR | ARM |
| 1 | Finland (3–0) | | 2–1 | 2–0 | 2–1 |
| 2 | Georgia (2–1) | 1–2 | | 3–0 | 2–0 |
| 3 | Norway (1–2) | 0–2 | 0–3 | | 2–1 |
| 4 | Armenia (0–3) | 1–2 | 0–2 | 1–2 | |

=== Play-offs ===
| Placing | A Team | Score | B Team |
|---|---|---|---|
| Promotional | Greece | 2–0 | Georgia |
| Promotional | Luxembourg | 2–1 | Finland |
| Relegation | South Africa | 1–2 | Armenia |
| Relegation | Liechtenstein | 2–0 | Norway |

- Greece and Luxembourg advanced to Group I for 2011.
- Norway and South Africa were relegated to Group III for 2011.

== Group III ==
- Venue: Smash Tennis Academy, Cairo, Egypt (outdoor clay)
- Date: 21–24 April

The seven teams were divided into one pool of three teams and one pool of four. The winner of each pool played the runner-up of the other pool to determine which two nations would be promoted to Group II in 2011.

=== Pools ===
| | Pool A | TUR | EGY | MDA |
| 1 | Turkey (2–0) | | 3–0 | 3–0 |
| 2 | Egypt (1–1) | 0–3 | | 3–0 |
| 3 | Moldova (0–2) | 0–3 | 0–3 | |

| | Pool B | MAR | ALG | IRL | MLT |
| 1 | Morocco (3–0) | | 3–0 | 3–0 | 3–0 |
| 2 | Algeria (2–1) | 0–3 | | 2–1 | 2–1 |
| 3 | Ireland (1–2) | 0–3 | 1–2 | | 3–0 |
| 4 | Malta (0–3) | 0–3 | 1–2 | 0–3 | |

=== Play-offs ===
| Placing | A Team | Score | B Team |
|---|---|---|---|
| Promotional | Turkey | 3–0 | Algeria |
| Promotional | Egypt | 0–2 | Morocco |
| 5th–6th | Moldova | 1–2 | Ireland |
| 7th | N/A | – | Malta |

Morocco and Turkey advanced to Group II for 2011.

== See also ==
- Fed Cup structure
