= Julia Moriarty =

Irish tennis player (born 1988)

- Country (sports): Australia (2005–2010; August 2012–present); Ireland (2010 – July 2012)
- Residence: Dublin, Ireland / Sydney, Australia
- Born: 3 December 1988 (age 37) Adelaide, Australia
- Height: 1.64 m (5 ft 4 1/2 in)
- Turned pro: 2005
- Retired: Jan 2015 (last match)
- Plays: Right (two-handed backhand)
- Prize money: $37,509

Singles
- Career record: 97–145
- Highest ranking: No. 615 (10 May 2010)

Doubles
- Career record: 55–119
- Career titles: 2 ITF
- Highest ranking: No. 486 (27 April 2009)

Julia Moriarty (born 3 December 1988) is a former professional Australian tennis player. She has career-high WTA rankings of 615 in singles and 486 in doubles. She competed for the Ireland Fed Cup team in 2010 and 2011, and accumulated a win-loss record of 7–6, before she returned to representing Australia.

== Personal life ==
Julia is the daughter of John Kundereri Moriarty. Moriarty represented Australia but switched to Ireland in 2010. She holds dual Irish and Australian citizenship through her paternal grandfather, who was originally from Tralee, County Kerry. Moriarty has been coached by Garry Cahill and her favourite surface was hardcourt.

== ITF finals ==
=== Doubles (2–2) ===
Legend
$50,000 tournaments
$25,000 tournaments
$10,000 tournaments

Result	No.	Date	Tournament	Surface	Partner	Opponents	Score
Loss	1.	11 May 2008	Fukuoka International, Japan	Carpet	(Japan) Maya Kato	(United Kingdom) Melanie South (Netherlands) Nicole Thyssen	6–4, 3–6, [12–14]
Loss	2.	13 June 2008	ITF Gurgaon, India	Hard	(Australia) Cassandra Chan	(South Korea) Han Sung-hee (India) Parija Maloo	3–6, 4–6
Win	3.	24 June 2012	ITF Williamsburg, United States	Clay	(United Kingdom) Laura Deigman	(United States) Jacqueline Cako (United States) Whitney Jones	6–4, 6–4
Win	4.	3 June 2013	ITF Quintana Roo, Mexico	Hard	(Japan) Akari Inoue	(Mexico) Ana Sofia Sanchez (Guatemala) Daniela Schippers	5–7, 7–6^{(4)}, [12–10]
