= Sofia Kvatsabaia =

Georgian tennis player

- Country (sports): Georgia
- Born: 18 July 1988 (age 37) Tbilisi, Soviet Union
- Retired: 2017
- Prize money: $107,259

Singles
- Career record: 317–268
- Career titles: 10 ITF
- Highest ranking: No. 362 (13 February 2012)

Doubles
- Career record: 234–166
- Career titles: 19 ITF
- Highest ranking: No. 257 (20 December 2010)

Team competitions
- Fed Cup: 4–9

Sofia Kvatsabaia (born 18 July 1988) is a retired Georgian tennis player.

In her career, Kvatsabaia has won ten singles and 19 doubles titles on the ITF Circuit. On 13 February 2012, she reached her career-high singles ranking of world No. 362. On 20 December 2010, she peaked at No. 257 in the WTA doubles rankings.

She has a 4–9 record for Georgia in Fed Cup competitions.

Kvatsavaia has retired and is now a coach for Georgian junior players.

== ITF Circuit finals ==
=== Singles: 17 (10–7) ===
Legend $25,000 tournaments $10,000 tournaments	Finals by surface Hard (3–2) Clay (7–5)

Outcome	No.	Date	Tournament	Surface	Opponent	Score
Runner-up	1.	18 April 2011	Qarshi, Uzbekistan	Hard	(Russia) Ekaterina Yashina	2–6, 3–6
Winner	1.	2 May 2011	Istanbul, Turkey	Hard	(Belarus) Ksenia Milevskaya	6–2, 6–1
Runner-up	2.	12 September 2011	Tbilisi, Georgia	Clay	(Georgia (country)) Tatia Mikadze	0–6, 2–6
Winner	2.	9 January 2012	Antalya, Turkey	Clay	(Russia) Eugeniya Pashkova	6–0, 6–2
Winner	3.	16 January 2012	Antalya, Turkey	Clay	(Venezuela) Marina Giral Lores	7–6^{(4)}, 6–1
Winner	4.	30 January 2012	Mallorca, Spain	Clay	(Spain) Yvonne Cavallé Reimers	6–2, 6–3
Runner-up	3.	14 January 2013	Antalya, Turkey	Clay	(Hungary) Réka Luca Jani	0–6, 1–6
Runner-up	4.	10 February 2014	Antalya, Turkey	Clay	(Romania) Patricia Maria Țig	3–6, 2–6
Winner	5.	24 February 2014	Antalya, Turkey	Clay	(Georgia (country)) Ekaterine Gorgodze	2–6, 6–0, 6–4
Winner	6.	16 June 2014	Astana, Kazakhstan	Hard	(Russia) Anastasia Pribylova	0–6, 6–1, 6–2
Runner-up	5.	23 June 2014	Astana, Kazakhstan	Hard	(Uzbekistan) Vlada Ekshibarova	5–7, 3–6
Winner	7.	19 January 2015	Antalya, Turkey	Clay	(France) Alice Bacquié	6–2, 6–3
Runner-up	6.	2 February 2015	Antalya, Turkey	Clay	(Germany) Anne Schäfer	2–6, 0–6
Winner	8.	16 February 2015	Antalya, Turkey	Clay	(Romania) Diana Buzean	6–4, 7–6^{(6)}
Winner	9.	4 May 2015	Puszczykowo, Poland	Hard	(Germany) Natalia Siedliska	6–1, 6–1
Winner	10.	5 October 2015	Shymkent, Kazakhstan	Clay	(Germany) Julyette Steur	6–4, 5–7, 6–1
Runner-up	7.	8 February 2016	Antalya, Turkey	Clay	(Germany) Anne Schäfer	3–6, 1–6

=== Doubles: 35 (19–16) ===
Legend $25,000 tournaments $10,000 tournaments	Finals by surface Hard (7–7) Clay (12–9)

Outcome	No.	Date	Tournament	Surface	Partnering	Opponents	Score
Runner-up	1.	28 August 2006	Baku, Azerbaijan	Clay	(Azerbaijan) Elina Gasanova	(Georgia (country)) Sofia Shapatava (Georgia (country)) Teona Tzertzvadze	4–6, 2–6
Runner-up	2.	30 April 2007	Antalya, Turkey	Hard	(Georgia (country)) Oksana Kalashnikova	(Serbia) Vojislava Lukić (Bulgaria) Dessislava Mladenova	6–2, 2–6, 3–6
Runner-up	3.	28 July 2008	Rabat, Morocco	Clay	(Russia) Avgusta Tsybysheva	(Morocco) Fatima El Allami (Italy) Lisa Sabino	0–6, 3–6
Winner	1.	30 March 2009	Antalya, Turkey	Hard	(Russia) Avgusta Tsybysheva	(Belarus) Ima Bohush (Russia) Maria Zharkova	6–4, 4–6, [10–8]
Runner-up	4.	6 April 2009	Antalya, Turkey	Hard	(Russia) Avgusta Tsybysheva	(United Kingdom) Anna Fitzpatrick (Denmark) Hanne Skak Jensen	6–7^{(3)}, 6–2, [7–10]
Winner	2.	14 July 2009	İzmir, Turkey	Hard	(Russia) Avgusta Tsybysheva	(Czech Republic) Zuzana Linhová (Poland) Sandra Zaniewska	6–0, 3–6, [10–5]
Runner-up	5.	21 July 2009	Istanbul, Turkey	Hard	(Russia) Avgusta Tsybysheva	(Turkey) Pemra Özgen (Georgia (country)) Manana Shapakidze	2–6, 2–6
Winner	3.	15 September 2009	Lleida, Spain	Clay	(Russia) Avgusta Tsybysheva	(Mexico) Ximena Hermoso (Spain) Garbiñe Muguruza	6–3, 6–2
Winner	4.	8 February 2010	Mallorca, Spain	Clay	(Russia) Avgusta Tsybysheva	(Italy) Benedetta Davato (Spain) Inés Ferrer Suárez	7–6^{(6)}, 6–4
Runner-up	6.	26 July 2010	Vigo, Spain	Hard	(Germany) Justine Ozga	(France) Anaïs Laurendon (United Kingdom) Anna Smith	3–6, 1–6
Winner	5.	28 February 2011	Lyon, France	Hard (i)	(Croatia) Maria Abramović	(Czech Republic) Martina Borecká (Czech Republic) Petra Krejsová	6–4, 3–6, [10–5]
Runner-up	7.	7 March 2011	Dijon, France	Hard (i)	(Croatia) Maria Abramović	(Czech Republic) Martina Borecká (Czech Republic) Petra Krejsová	3–6, 4–6
Winner	6.	2 May 2011	Istanbul, Turkey	Hard	(Romania) Laura-Ioana Andrei	(Bulgaria) Dessislava Mladenova (Slovenia) Anja Prislan	6–2, 6–2
Runner-up	8.	8 August 2011	Istanbul, Turkey	Hard	(Bulgaria) Isabella Shinikova	(Portugal) Magali de Lattre (United Kingdom) Lisa Whybourn	3–6, 6–2, [10–12]
Winner	7.	12 September 2011	Tbilisi, Georgia	Clay	(Georgia (country)) Tatia Mikadze	(Turkmenistan) Anastasiya Prenko (Belarus) Viktoria Yemialyanava	6–1, 6–3
Winner	8.	17 October 2011	Antalya, Turkey	Clay	(Ukraine) Maryna Zanevska	(Romania) Diana Enache (Netherlands) Daniëlle Harmsen	6–4, 6–1
Winner	9.	23 April 2012	Antalya, Turkey	Hard	(Georgia (country)) Oksana Kalashnikova	(Romania) Ana Bogdan (Russia) Maria Mokh	6–4, 6–4
Winner	10.	13 August 2012	Ratingen, Germany	Clay	(Georgia (country)) Ekaterine Gorgodze	(Germany) Kim Grajdek (Poland) Sylwia Zagórska	6–3, 6–4
Winner	11.	20 August 2012	Enschede, Netherlands	Clay	(Georgia (country)) Ekaterine Gorgodze	(Netherlands) Kim Kilsdonk (Netherlands) Nicolette van Uitert	6–4, 1–6, [10–6]
Runner-up	9.	24 December 2012	Istanbul, Turkey	Hard (i)	(Georgia (country)) Ekaterine Gorgodze	(Belarus) Lidziya Marozava (Russia) Ekaterina Yashina	3–6, 2–6
Runner-up	10.	7 January 2013	Antalya, Turkey	Clay	(Ukraine) Marianna Zakarlyuk	(Japan) Chiaki Okadaue (Turkey) Melis Sezer	3–6, 4–6
Runner-up	11.	11 February 2013	Antalya, Turkey	Clay	(Georgia (country)) Ekaterine Gorgodze	(Serbia) Teodora Mirčić (Romania) Raluca Elena Platon	6–1, 5–4 ret.
Winner	12.	17 February 2014	Antalya, Turkey	Clay	(Austria) Pia König	(China) Li Yihong (China) Yang Zhaoxuan	2–1 ret.
Winner	13.	17 March 2014	Antalya, Turkey	Hard	(Georgia (country)) Ekaterine Gorgodze	(Serbia) Natalija Kostić (Slovakia) Chantal Škamlová	4–6, 6–1, [10–8]
Runner-up	12.	19 May 2014	Caserta, Italy	Clay	(Georgia (country)) Ekaterine Gorgodze	(Australia) Samantha Harris (Australia) Sally Peers	3–6, 6–7^{(6)}
Winner	14.	16 June 2014	Astana, Kazakhstan	Hard	(Montenegro) Ana Veselinović	(Uzbekistan) Albina Khabibulina (Kazakhstan) Ekaterina Kylueva	7–6^{(5)}, 7–6^{(3)}
Winner	15.	24 November 2014	Antalya, Turkey	Clay	(Georgia (country)) Ekaterine Gorgodze	(Hungary) Réka Luca Jani (Bulgaria) Julia Stamatova	7–6^{(3)}, 7–6^{(7)}
Winner	16.	1 December 2014	Antalya, Turkey	Clay	(Slovakia) Chantal Škamlová	(Georgia (country)) Ekaterine Gorgodze (Slovenia) Nastja Kolar	w/o
Runner-up	13.	19 January 2015	Antalya, Turkey	Clay	(Georgia (country)) Ekaterine Gorgodze	(Turkey) Melis Sezer (South Africa) Chanel Simmonds	4–6, 6–4, [4–10]
Winner	17.	26 January 2015	Antalya, Turkey	Clay	(Georgia (country)) Ekaterine Gorgodze	(Poland) Agata Barańska (France) Victoria Muntean	6–2, 6–2
Winner	18.	5 October 2015	Shymkent, Kazakhstan	Clay	(Georgia (country)) Ekaterine Gorgodze	(Uzbekistan) Albina Khabibulina (Uzbekistan) Polina Merenkova	7–5, 3–6, [10–6]
Winner	19.	12 October 2015	Shymkent, Kazakhstan	Clay	(Georgia (country)) Ekaterine Gorgodze	(Kazakhstan) Kamila Kerimbayeva (Russia) Margarita Lazareva	7–5, 6–2
Runner-up	14.	23 November 2015	Antalya, Turkey	Clay	(Germany) Julyette Steur	(Hungary) Anna Bondár (Hungary) Rebeka Stolmár	6–2, 4–6, [2–10]
Runner-up	15.	30 November 2015	Antalya, Turkey	Clay	(Ukraine) Alona Fomina	(Germany) Christina Shakovets (Ukraine) Alyona Sotnikova	5–7, 4–6
Runner-up	16.	11 January 2016	Antalya, Turkey	Clay	(Georgia (country)) Ekaterine Gorgodze	(Hungary) Ágnes Bukta (Austria) Julia Grabher	6–1, 4–6, [9–11]
