= Kamilla Farhad =

Azerbaijani tennis player

Kamilla Farhad Kamilla Fərhad
- Country (sports): Azerbaijan
- Born: January 18, 1996 (age 29); Azerbaijan
- Plays: Right-handed (two-handed backhand)
- Prize money: $11,584

Singles
- Career record: 4-15
- Career titles: 0
- Highest ranking: 1141 (7 November 2011)

Doubles
- Career record: 5-16
- Career titles: 0
- Highest ranking: 539 (10 October 2011)
- Last updated on: 24 July 2014.

Kamilla Farhad (Azerbaijani: Kamilla Fərhad; born 18 January 1996) is an Azerbaijani tennis player.

On 7 November 2011, she reached her best singles ranking of world number 1141. On 10 October 2011, she peaked at world number 539 in the doubles rankings.

Farhad made her Women's Tennis Association tour debut at the inaugural 2011 Baku Cup as a wildcard, but lost in the first round to Aravane Rezaï of France. In the doubles tournament, she partnered with Nigina Abduraimova reached the quarterfinals before falling to Monica Niculescu and Galina Voskoboeva.

== International Tennis Federation Junior Finals ==
Grand Slam
Category GA
Category G1
Category G2
Category G3
Category G4
Category G5

=== Singles Finals (1–0) ===
Outcome	No.	Date	Tournament	Surface	Opponent	Score
Winner	1.	7 September 2012	Tabriz, Iran	Clay	(Iran) Elaheh Ashrafianbonab	6–1, 6–1

=== Doubles finals (1–2) ===
Outcome	No.	Date	Tournament	Surface	Partner	Opponents in the final	Score in the final
Winner	1.	7 September 2012	Tabriz, Iran	Clay	(Iran) Sadaf Sadeghvaziri	(Iran) Sarvin Alimirzalou (Pakistan) Iman Qureshi	6–0, 6–0
Runner-up	2.	21 October 2012	Florianópolis, Brazil	Clay	(Brazil) Eduarda Nardi dos Santos	(Brazil) Ingrid Gamarra Martins (Brazil) Luisa Rosa	5–7, 6–7^{(4)}
Runner-up	3.	28 October 2012	Salvador, Brazil	Hard	(Portugal) Ivone Alvaro	(Colombia) María Paulina Pérez (Colombia) Paula Andrea Pérez	0–6, 1–6
