= Manana Shapakidze =

Georgian tennis player

Manana Shapakidze მანანა შაფაქიძე
- Country (sports): Georgia
- Born: 14 September 1989 (age 35)
- Turned pro: 2004
- Plays: Right (two-handed backhand)
- Prize money: $28,790

Singles
- Career record: 91–70
- Career titles: 3 ITF
- Highest ranking: No. 382 (17 May 2010)

Doubles
- Career record: 68–59
- Career titles: 3 ITF
- Highest ranking: No. 331 (19 July 2010)

Manana Shapakidze (Georgian: მანანა შაფაქიძე, romanized: manana shapakidze, pronounced [manana ʃapʰakʰidze]; born 14 September 1989) is a Georgian former professional tennis player.

In her career, she won three singles and three doubles titles on the ITF Women's Circuit. On 17 May 2010, she reached her best singles ranking of world No. 382. On 19 July 2010, she peaked at No. 331 in the doubles rankings.

Playing for Georgia in Fed Cup competitions, Shapakidze has a win–loss record of 1–1.

== ITF finals ==
=== Singles (3–2) ===
Legend $25,000 tournaments $10,000 tournaments	Finals by surface Hard (3–1) Clay (0–1)

Result	No.	Date	Tournament	Surface	Opponent	Score
Loss	1.	12 September 2005	ITF Tbilisi, Georgia	Clay	(Georgia (country)) Margalita Chakhnashvili	2–6, 1–6
Win	1.	24 May 2008	ITF Raanana, İsrael	Hard	(Greece) Eirini Georgatou	2–6, 7–6^{(5)}, 6–1
Win	2.	1 June 2009	ITF Tel Aviv, Israel	Hard	(Belgium) Sophie Cornerotte	6–2, 1–6, 7–5
Loss	2.	11 July 2009	ITF Gaziantep, Turkey	Hard	(Portugal) Magali de Lattre	6–7^{(3)}, 3–6
Win	3.	12 April 2010	ITF Astana, Kazakhstan	Hard (i)	(Russia) Daria Kuchmina	6–7^{(4)}, 6–1, 6–4

=== Doubles (3–5) ===
Legend $50,000 tournaments $25,000 tournaments $10,000 tournaments	Finals by surface Hard (2–1) Clay (1–3) Carpet (0–1)

Result	No.	Date	Tournament	Surface	Partner	Opponents	Score
Loss	1.	14 August 2007	ITF Bielefeld, Germany	Clay	(Netherlands) Leonie Mekel	(New Zealand) Dianne Hollands (United States) Kady Pooler	2–6, 4–6
Win	1.	10 September 2007	ITF Tbilisi, Georgia	Clay	(Russia) Avgusta Tsybysheva	(Georgia (country)) Tinatin Kavlashvili (Georgia (country)) Sofia Shapatava	6–1, 1–6, [10–8]
Win	2.	24 May 2008	ITF Ra'anana, Israel	Hard	(Israel) Julia Glushko	(Israel) Chen Astrogo (Netherlands) Marcella Koek	7–5, 6–7^{(5)}, [10–6]
Loss	2.	13 August 2008	ITF London, England	Hard	(Slovakia) Martina Babáková	(United States) Megan Moulton-Levy (United Kingdom) Emily Webley-Smith	1–6, 1–6
Win	3.	20 July 2009	ITF İstanbul, Turkey	Hard	(Turkey) Pemra Özgen	(Georgia (country)) Sofia Kvatsabaia (Russia) Avgusta Tsybysheva	6–2, 6–2
Loss	3.	7 September 2009	ITF Casale Monferrato, Italy	Clay	(Russia) Anastasia Mukhametova	(Italy) Valentine Confalonieri (Italy) Benedetta Davato	6–3, 3–6, 4–6
Loss	4.	21 September 2009	Telavi Open, Georgia	Clay	(Georgia (country)) Tatia Mikadze	(Netherlands) Chayenne Ewijk (Netherlands) Marlot Meddens	2–6, 4–6
Loss	5.	28 September 2009	ITF Tbilisi, Georgia	Carpet	(Georgia (country)) Tatia Mikadze	(Hungary) Réka Luca Jani (Ukraine) Veronika Kapshay	5–7, 6–0, [8–10]

== Fed Cup participation ==
=== Doubles ===
Edition	Date	Location	Against	Surface	Partner	Opponents	W/L	Score
2009 Fed Cup; Europe/Africa Zone Group II	23 April 2009	Antalya, Turkey	(Turkey) Turkey	Hard	(Georgia (country)) Sofia Shapatava	(Turkey) Melis Sezer (Turkey) İpek Şenoğlu	W	6–3, 6–7^{(4)}, 6–4
2009 Fed Cup; Europe/Africa Zone Group II	25 April 2009	Antalya, Turkey	Latvia	Hard	(Georgia (country)) Sofia Shapatava	(Latvia) Līga Dekmeijere (Latvia) Diāna Marcinkēviča	L	1–6, 2–6
