= 2011 Fed Cup Europe/Africa Zone =

Regional zone of women's tennis competition

The Europe/Africa Zone was one of three zones of regional competition in the 2011 Fed Cup.

== Group I ==
- Venue: Municipal Tennis Club, Eilat, Israel (hard, outdoors)
- Date: 2–5 February

The fifteen teams were divided into three pools of four teams and one pool of three. The four pool winners took part in play-offs to determine the two nations advancing to the World Group II Play-offs. The nations finishing last in their pools took part in play-offs, with the two losing nations relegated to Group II in 2012.

=== Pools ===
	Pool A	SUI	GBR	DEN
1	Switzerland (2–0)		2–1	2–1
2	Great Britain (1–1)	1–2		2–1
3	Denmark (0–2)	1–2	1–2	

	Pool B	POL	ISR	LUX	BUL
1	Poland (2–1)		2–1	2–1	1–2
2	Israel (2–1)	1–2		3–0	2–1
3	Luxembourg (1–2)	1–2	0–3		2–1
4	Bulgaria (1–2)	2–1	1–2	1–2	

	Pool C	BLR	CRO	AUT	GRE
1	Belarus (3–0)		3–0	3–0	3–0
2	Croatia (1–2)	0–3		3–0	0–3
3	Austria (1–2)	0–3	0–3		3–0
4	Greece (1–2)	0–3	3–0	0–3	

	Pool D	NED	ROU	HUN	LAT
1	Netherlands (3–0)		3–0	3–0	3–0
2	Romania (2–1)	0–3		2–1	2–1
3	Hungary (1–2)	0–3	1–2		3–0
4	Latvia (0–3)	0–3	1–2	0–3	

=== Play-offs ===
Placing	A Team	Score	C/D Team
Promotional	Switzerland	2–1	Netherlands
5th–8th	Great Britain	2–0	Croatia
9th–12th	N/A	–	Hungary
Relegation	Denmark	1–2	Greece

Placing	B Team	Score	C/D Team
Promotional	Poland	0–2	Belarus
5th–8th	Israel	2–1	Romania
9th–12th	Luxembourg	1–2	Austria
Relegation	Bulgaria	2–0	Latvia

- Belarus and Switzerland advanced to World Group II play-offs.
- Denmark and Latvia were relegated to Europe/Africa Group II in 2012.

== Group II ==
- Venue: Smash Tennis Academy, Cairo, Egypt (clay, outdoors)
- Date: Week of 2 May (ties played 4–7 May)

The seven teams were divided into one pool of four teams and one pool of three. The top nation from each pool played off against the runner-up from the other with the two winning teams promoted to the Europe/Africa Zone Group I for 2012. The third place nation from each pool played off against the last place nation of the other, with the two losing nations relegated to Group III in 2012.

=== Pools ===
	Pool A	POR	FIN	MAR
1	Portugal (2–0)		2–1	2–1
2	Finland (1–1)	1–2		2–1
3	Morocco (0–2)	1–2	1–2	

	Pool B	BIH	GEO	TUR	ARM
1	Bosnia and Herzegovina (3–0)		2–1	3–0	3–0
2	Georgia (2–1)	1–2		3–0	2–1
3	Turkey (1–2)	0–3	0–3		3–0
4	Armenia (0–3)	0–3	1–2	0–3	

=== Play-offs ===
Placing	A Team	Score	B Team
Promotion	Portugal	2–0	Georgia
Promotion	Finland	1–2	Bosnia and Herzegovina
Relegation	Morocco	0–2	Turkey
Relegation	N/A	–	Armenia

- Portugal and Bosnia and Herzegovina promoted to Europe/Africa World Group I in 2012.
- Armenia and Morocco were relegated to Europe/Africa Group III in 2012.

== Group III ==
- Venue: Smash Tennis Academy, Cairo, Egypt (clay, outdoors)
- Date: Week of 2 May (ties played 2–7 May)

The nine teams were divided into one pool of five teams and one pool of four. The top nation from each pool played off against the runner-up from the other with the two winning teams promoted to the Europe/Africa Zone Group II for 2012.

=== Pools ===
	Pool A	RSA	MNE	LIT	ALG
1	South Africa (3–0)		2–1	3–0	3–0
2	Montenegro (2–1)	1–2		3–0	3–0
3	Lithuania (1–2)	0–3	0–3		3–0
4	Algeria (0–3)	0–3	0–3	0–3	

	Pool B	TUN	EGY	NOR	IRL	MDA
1	Tunisia (4–0)		2–1	2–1	3–0	3–0
2	Egypt (3–1)	1–2		2–1	2–1	2–1
3	Norway (2–2)	1–2	1–2		2–1	3–0
4	Ireland (1–3)	0–3	1–2	1–2		3–0
5	Moldova (0–4)	0–3	1–2	0–3	0–3	

=== Play-offs ===
Placing	A Team	Score	B Team
Promotion	South Africa	3–0	Egypt
Promotion	Montenegro	2–0	Tunisia
5th–8th	Lithuania	0–0	Norway
5th–8th	Algeria	0–0	Ireland
9th	N/A	–	Moldova

- South Africa and Montenegro promoted to Europe/Africa Zone Group II in 2012.
- Norway was reassigned to Europe/Africa Zone Group II for 2012.

== See also ==
- Fed Cup structure
