= Eirini Georgatou =

Greek tennis player

Eirini Georgatou Ειρήνη Γεωργάτου
- Country (sports): Greece
- Residence: Athens, Greece
- Born: 1 February 1990 (age 35)
- Turned pro: 2005
- Retired: 2011
- Plays: Right (two-handed backhand)
- Prize money: $86,122

Singles
- Career record: 122–84
- Career titles: 5 ITF
- Highest ranking: No. 176 (16 May 2011)

Grand Slam singles results
- Australian Open: Q1 (2011)
- French Open: Q2 (2011)
- Wimbledon: Q1 (2011)
- US Open: Q2 (2011)

Doubles
- Career record: 41–48
- Career titles: 2 ITF
- Highest ranking: No. 171 (31 January 2011)

Team competitions
- Fed Cup: 10–4

Eirini Georgatou (Greek: Ειρήνη Γεωργάτου; born 1 February 1990) is a Greek former tennis player.

On 16 May 2011, she reached her career-high singles ranking of 176. Her highest doubles ranking of 171 she achieved on 31 January 2011. Most of her success came in tournaments in Greece, Israel, Turkey, and Uzbekistan.

In September 2010, she qualified for her first WTA Tour event, in Tashkent, Uzbekistan. She won three qualifying matches in straight sets, and then lost to second-seeded and hometown favorite Akgul Amanmuradova in the first round of the main draw. She played doubles with Russian partner Elena Bovina, and they reached the quarterfinals before falling 9–11 in the third set super tiebreaker to fourth-seeded Maria Kondratieva of Russia and Sophie Lefèvre of France.

== Fed Cup ==
In February 2011, she represented Greece in Group One Euro/African Zone of the fed cup which took place in Eilat, Israel. In the round-robin stage on 2 February 2011, she won over Jelena Pandžić from Croatia (2–6, 6–1, 6–4), and with the Greek Eleni Daniilidou, she beat Ani Mijacika and Silvia Njiric in the doubles, 6–3, 2–6, 6–2, and completed 3–0 win of Greece over Croatia. On 3 February 2011 she lost to Patricia Mayr-Achleitner (6–4, 3–6, 3–6), and lost with Despina Papamichail to Melanie Klaffner and Sandra Klemenschits whom represented Austria. On 4 February 2011, she lost to Olga Govortsova 2–6, 3–6. In the relegation round against Denmark, on 5 February 2011, she defeated Karen Barbat 6–1, 7–6^{(2)} in singles, and in the doubles with Eleni Daniilidou, she defeated Danish double Mai Grage and Caroline Wozniacki, 6–2, 7–5. This win made sure Greece will stay in Group 1 of the Fed cup.

== ITF Circuit finals ==
$100,000 tournaments
$75,000 tournaments
$50,000 tournaments
$25,000 tournaments
$10,000 tournaments

=== Singles: 8 (5 titles, 3 runner-ups) ===
Result	No.	Date	Tournament	Surface	Opponent	Score
Loss	1.	15 March 2008	ITF Ramat HaSharon, İsrael	Hard	(Slovakia) Lenka Juríková	4–6, 3–6
Loss	2.	24 May 2008	ITF Raanana, İsrael	Hard	(Georgia (country)) Manana Shapakidze	2–6, 7–6^{(5)}, 1–6
Win	3.	5 October 2008	ITF Mytilene, Greece	Hard	(Ukraine) Ganna Piven	6–4, 6–2
Win	4.	6 April 2009	ITF Antalya, Turkey	Hard	(Ukraine) Katerina Avdiyenko	3–2 ret.
Win	5.	13 April 2009	ITF Antalya, Turkey	Hard	(Ukraine) Tetyana Arefyeva	6–3, 6–7^{(5)}, 7–5
Win	6.	8 June 2009	ITF Qarshi, Uzbekistan	Hard	(Ukraine) Kristina Antoniychuk	6–1, 3–1 ret.
Win	7.	5 June 2010	ITF Bukhara, Uzbekistan	Hard	(Georgia (country)) Sofia Shapatava	1–6, 6–1, 6–3
Loss	8.	24 October 2010	GB Pro-Series Glasgow, United Kingdom	Hard	(Czech Republic) Karolína Plíšková	3–6, 6–0, 6–3

=== Doubles: 5 (2 titles, 3 runner-ups) ===
Result	No.	Date	Tournament	Surface	Partner	Opponents	Score
Loss	1.	5 October 2008	ITF Mytilene, Greece	Hard	(Australia) Jade Hopper	(Russia) Renata Bakieva (Latvia) Diāna Marcinkēviča	1–6, 3–6
Win	2.	7 February 2010	ITF Sutton, United Kingdom	Hard	(Russia) Valeria Savinykh	(United Kingdom) Naomi Cavaday (United Kingdom) Anna Smith	7–5, 2–6, [10–8]
Win	3.	16 April 2010	Soweto Open, South Africa	Hard	(Russia) Vitalia Diatchenko	(New Zealand) Marina Erakovic (Thailand) Tamarine Tanasugarn	6–3, 5–7, [16–14]
Loss	4.	24 October 2010	GB Pro-Series Glasgow, UK	Hard (i)	(Russia) Valeria Savinykh	(Denmark) Karen Barbat (Italy) Julia Mayr	w/o
Loss	5.	10 October 2011	Open de Touraine, France	Hard (i)	(France) Irena Pavlovic	(Ukraine) Lyudmyla Kichenok (Ukraine) Nadiia Kichenok	2–6, 0–6
