= Tatia Mikadze =

Georgian tennis player

- Country (sports): Georgia
- Born: 27 March 1988 (age 37); Tbilisi
- Turned pro: 2004
- Plays: Right (two-handed backhand)
- Prize money: $38,632

Singles
- Career record: 94–55
- Career titles: 3 ITF
- Highest ranking: No. 281 (13 September 2010)

Doubles
- Career record: 62–39
- Career titles: 5 ITF
- Highest ranking: No. 255 (6 June 2011)

Team competitions
- Fed Cup: 7–7

Tatia Mikadze (Georgian: თათია მიქაძე; born 27 March 1988) is a Georgian former professional tennis player.

Her career-high singles ranking is world No. 281, achieved on 13 September 2010. On 6 June 2011, she peaked at No. 255 in the doubles rankings. Mikadze won three singles and five doubles titles on the ITF Circuit.

She qualified as a lucky loser for the main draw of the Baku Cup, an event of the 2011 WTA Tour, and defeated Nina Khrisanova 6–0, 6–0, to advance to the second round.

== ITF Circuit finals ==
Legend
$50,000 tournaments
$25,000 tournaments
$10,000 tournaments

=== Singles: 5 (3 titles, 2 runner-ups) ===
Result	No.	Date	Tournament	Surface	Opponent	Score
Win	1.	10 September 2007	ITF Tbilisi, Georgia	Clay	(Georgia (country)) Tinatin Kavlashvili	1–6, 6–4, 7–5
Win	2.	19 July 2010	ITF Kharkiv, Ukraine	Clay	(Russia) Natalia Ryzhonkova	6–7^{(5)}, 6–2, 6–4
Loss	1.	27 September 2010	ITF Tbilisi, Georgia	Clay	(Georgia (country)) Margalita Chakhnashvili	4–6, 6–3, 5–7
Win	3.	12 September 2011	ITF Tbilisi, Georgia	Clay	(Georgia (country)) Sofia Kvatsabaia	6–0, 6–2
Loss	2.	10 October 2011	ITF Yerevan, Armenia	Clay	(Slovakia) Anna Karolína Schmiedlová	4–6, 3–6

=== Doubles: 11 (5 titles, 6 runner-ups) ===
Result	No.	Date	Tournament	Surface	Partnering	Opponents	Score
Win	1.	6 June 2004	ITF Istanbul, Turkey	Hard	(Georgia (country)) Nana Urotadze	(Ukraine) Irina Buryachok (Russia) Aleksandra Kostikova	6–1, 6–2
Loss	1.	21 September 2009	Telavi Open, Georgia	Clay	(Georgia (country)) Manana Shapakidze	(Netherlands) Chayenne Ewijk (Netherlands) Marlot Meddens	2–6, 4–6
Loss	2.	28 September 2009	Batumi Open, Georgia	Clay	(Georgia (country)) Manana Shapakidze	(Hungary) Réka Luca Jani (Ukraine) Veronika Kapshay	5–7, 6–0, [8–10]
Win	2.	31 May 2010	ITF Bukhara, Uzbekistan	Hard	(Georgia (country)) Sofia Shapatava	(Indonesia) Yayuk Basuki (Indonesia) Jessy Rompies	6–3, 6–3
Win	3.	27 September 2010	Batumi Open, Georgia	Clay	(Georgia (country)) Sofia Shapatava	(Poland) Paula Kania (Hungary) Zsófia Susányi	6–3, 6–2
Win	4.	12 September 2011	Batumi Open, Georgia	Clay	(Georgia (country)) Sofia Kvatsabaia	(Turkmenistan) Anastasiya Prenko (Belarus) Viktoria Yemialyanava	6–1, 6–3
Win	5.	3 October 2011	ITF Yerevan, Armenia	Clay	(Georgia (country)) Sofia Shapatava	(Ukraine) Elizaveta Ianchuk (Ukraine) Olga Ianchuk	6–1, 6–4
Loss	3.	10 October 2011	ITF Yerevan, Armenia	Clay	(Armenia) Ani Amiraghyan	(Italy) Anastasia Grymalska (Ukraine) Anastasiya Vasylyeva	3–6, 3–6
Loss	4.	2 September 2016	Batumi Ladies Open, Georgia	Clay	(Georgia (country)) Mariam Bolkvadze	(Ukraine) Alona Fomina (Russia) Margarita Lazareva	4–6, 2–6
Loss	5.	10 September 2016	Telavi Open, Georgia	Clay	(Georgia (country)) Sofia Shapatava	(Russia) Natela Dzalamidze (Russia) Veronika Kudermetova	4–6, 2–6
Loss	6.	15 September 2017	Batumi Ladies Open, Georgia	Hard	(Georgia (country)) Sofia Shapatava	(Belgium) Ysaline Bonaventure (Slovakia) Viktória Kužmová	1–6, 3–6
