= Lina Bennani =

Moroccan tennis player

- Country (sports): Morocco
- Born: 4 July 1991 (age 33); Casablanca, Morocco
- Plays: Right-handed
- Prize money: $14,079

Singles
- Career record: 27–47
- Highest ranking: No. 672 (25 April 2011)

Doubles
- Career record: 27–30
- Career titles: 3 ITF
- Highest ranking: No. 579 (4 May 2009)

Team competitions
- Fed Cup: 5–1

Lina Bennani (born 4 July 1991) is a Moroccan former professional tennis player.

Born in Casablanca, Bennani participated in six Fed Cup ties for Morocco between 2008 and 2011, mostly as a doubles player. She won her only singles rubber, over Malta's Elaine Genovese in 2010.

Bennani, who won three ITF doubles titles, competed in the main draw of her home WTA Tour tournament, the Morocco Open, once in singles and four times in doubles.

At the 2011 Pan Arab Games in Doha, Bennani won bronze medals in the singles and team events for Morocco.

== ITF finals ==
=== Doubles: 4 (3–1) ===
Outcome	No.	Date	Tournament	Surface	Partner	Opponents	Score
Winner	1.	31 August 2008	ITF La Marsa, Tunisia	Clay	(Morocco) Fatima El Allami	(Belgium) Davinia Lobbinger (Slovenia) Mika Urbančič	4–6, 6–4, [11–9]
Runner-up	1.	12 October 2008	ITF Espinho, Portugal	Clay	(Poland) Veronika Domagala	(Morocco) Fatima El Allami (Portugal) Catarina Ferreira	1–6, 3–6
Winner	2.	19 October 2008	ITF Lisbon, Portugal	Clay	(Poland) Veronika Domagala	(Morocco) Fatima El Allami (Portugal) Catarina Ferreira	7–5, 4–6, [11–9]
Winner	3.	18 July 2010	ITF Casablanca, Morocco	Clay	(Netherlands) Anouk Tigu	(Spain) Laura Apaolaza-Miradevilla (Spain) Montserrat Blasco-Fernandez	6–1, 6–2
