= Fatima El Allami =

Moroccan tennis player (born 1989)

- Full name: Fatima-Zahra El Allami
- Country (sports): Morocco
- Residence: Casablanca, Morocco
- Born: 26 March 1989 (age 37) Meknes, Morocco
- Plays: Left (two-handed forehand)
- Prize money: $46,021

Singles
- Career record: 103–80
- Career titles: 3 ITF
- Highest ranking: No. 433 (1 November 2010)

Doubles
- Career record: 84–55
- Career titles: 12 ITF
- Highest ranking: No. 420 (20 July 2009)

Fatima El Allami
Medal record

Representing Morocco

Women's Tennis

Mediterranean Games
Bronze medal – third place	2009 Pescara	Women's doubles

Fatima-Zahra El Allami (born 26 March 1989) is a Moroccan former professional tennis player.

== Tennis career ==
In her career, El Allami won three singles titles and 12 doubles titles on the ITF Circuit. On 1 November 2010, she reached her highest singles ranking of world No. 433. In July 2009, she peaked at No. 420 in the WTA doubles rankings.

She was awarded a wildcard for the Grand Prix SAR La Princesse Lalla Meryem every year since 2007, but she never passed the first round.

Playing for Morocco Fed Cup team since 2008, El Allami has a win–loss record of 19–11.

== ITF Circuit finals ==
$25,000 tournaments
$10,000 tournaments

=== Singles (3–5) ===
Result	No.	Date	Location	Surface	Opponent	Score
Win	1.	27 August 2008	La Marsa, Tunisia	Clay	(Belgium) Davinia Lobbinger	7–6^{(7–0)}, 6–2
Loss	1.	6 October 2008	Espinho, Portugal	Clay	(Czech Republic) Kateřina Vaňková	2–6, 3–6
Win	2.	21 September 2009	Espinho, Portugal	Clay	(France) Elixane Lechemia	6–3, 6–2
Loss	2.	17 July 2010	Casablanca, Morocco	Clay	(Slovakia) Martina Balogová	5–7, 7–6^{(7–4)}, 4–6
Win	3.	26 September 2010	Algiers, Algeria	Clay	(Czech Republic) Zuzana Linhová	6–1, 6–4
Loss	3.	3 October 2010	Algiers, Algeria	Clay	(Netherlands) Marcella Koek	4–6, 4–6
Loss	4.	10 October 2010	Algiers, Algeria	Clay	(Croatia) Silvia Njirić	6–3, 3–6, 1–6
Loss	5.	16 July 2011	Tanger, Morocco	Clay	(Mexico) Ximena Hermoso	1–6, 6–7^{(5–7)}

=== Doubles (12–6) ===
Result	No.	Date	Location	Surface	Partner	Opponents	Score
Win	1.	23 March 2008	Ain Sukhna, Egypt	Clay	(Oman) Fatma Al-Nabhani	(Ukraine) Yelyzaveta Rybakova (France) Nadège Vergos	6–4, 6–4
Loss	1.	5 May 2008	Vic, Spain	Clay	(Armenia) Anna Movsisyan	(Switzerland) Lisa Sabino (Italy) Benedetta Davato	2–6, 2–6
Win	2.	28 July 2008	Rabat, Morocco	Clay	(Switzerland) Lisa Sabino	(Georgia (country)) Sofia Kvatsabaia (Russia) Avgusta Tsybysheva	6–0, 6–3
Win	3.	11 August 2008	Koksijde, Belgium	Clay	(Australia) Hayley Ericksen	(Netherlands) Josanne van Bennekom (France) Nadege Vergos	4–6, 6–3, [10–7]
Win	4.	25 August 2008	La Marsa, Tunisia	Clay	(Morocco) Lina Bennani	(Belgium) Davinia Lobbinger (Slovenia) Mika Urbančič	4–6, 6–4, [11–9]
Win	5.	6 October 2008	Espinho, Portugal	Clay	(Portugal) Catarina Ferreira	(Morocco) Lina Bennani (Poland) Veronika Domagala	6–1, 6–3
Loss	2.	13 October 2008	Lisbon, Portugal	Clay	(Portugal) Catarina Ferreira	(Morocco) Lina Bennani (Poland) Veronika Domagala	5–7, 6–4, [9–11]
Win	6.	20 October 2008	Vila Real de Santo António, Portugal	Clay	(Morocco) Nadia Lalami	(Italy) Raffaella Bindi (Netherlands) Claire Lablans	6–4, 6–3
Win	7.	11 February 2009	Mallorca, Spain	Clay	(Spain) Rebeca Bou Nogueiro	(Spain) Lucía Sainz (Spain) Leticia Costas	6–4, 6–1
Win	8.	2 March 2009	Giza, Egypt	Clay	(Georgia (country)) Oksana Kalashnikova	(Netherlands) Marlot Meddens (Netherlands) Bibiane Weijers	6–4, 6–2
Win	9.	27 Jul 2009	Rabat, Morocco	Clay	(Switzerland) Lisa Sabino	(Austria) Natasha Bredl (Austria) Stephanie Hirsch	7–5, 6–1
Loss	3.	10 October 2009	Antalya, Turkey	Clay	(Portugal) Magali de Lattre	(Romania) Mihaela Buzărnescu (Czech Republic) Kateřina Vaňková	1–6, 1–6
Loss	4.	1 February 2010	Mallorca, Spain	Clay	(Morocco) Nadia Lalami	(Russia) Viktoria Kamenskaya (Russia) Daria Kuchmina	5–7, 4–6
Loss	5.	28 August 2010	Fleurus, Belgium	Clay	(Belgium) Gally De Wael	(Romania) Diana Buzean (France) Alizé Lim	0–6, 3–6
Win	10.	2 October 2010	Algiers, Algeria	Clay	(Netherlands) Marcella Koek	(Ukraine) Khristina Kazimova (Morocco) Nadia Lalami	6–0, 6–1
Win	11.	9 October 2010	Algiers, Algeria	Clay	(Netherlands) Marcella Koek	(Belgium) Sophie Cornerotte (France) Jennifer Migan	6–4, 6–3
Win	12.	15 July 2011	Tanger, Morocco	Clay	(Russia) Anna Morgina	(Italy) Anna Agamennone (Italy) Linda Mair	3–6, 6–4, [10–6]
Loss	6.	5 April 2012	Algiers, Algeria	Clay	(Italy) Costanza Mecchi	(Russia) Alexandra Romanova (Germany) Alina Wessel	6–4, 1–6, [10–12]
