= 2007 Fed Cup Europe/Africa Zone Group I – play-offs =

International tennis competition play-offs

The play-offs of the 2007 Fed Cup Europe/Africa Zone Group I were the final stages of the Group I Zonal Competition involving teams from Europe and Africa. Using the positions determined in their pools, the sixteen teams faced off to determine their placing in the 2007 Fed Cup Europe/Africa Zone Group I. The top two teams advanced to World Group II play-offs, and the bottom two teams were relegated down to the Europe/Africa Zone Group II for the next year.

Placing	Pool A	Pool B	Pool C	Pool D
1	Romania	Ukraine	Serbia	Poland
2	Switzerland	Belarus	Slovenia	Luxembourg
3	Denmark	Hungary	Sweden	Great Britain
4	Netherlands	Lithuania	Estonia	Bulgaria

== Promotion play-offs ==
The first placed teams of each pool were placed against each other in two head-to-head rounds. The winner of the rounds advanced to the World Group II play-offs, where they would get a chance to advance to the World Group II for next year.

=== Romania vs. Serbia ===
Romania
1
TC Lokomotiv, Plovdiv, Bulgaria
21 April 2007
Red clay (outdoors)

Serbia
2

			1	2	3
1	(Romania) (Serbia)	Mădălina Gojnea; Ana Timotić	1; 6	6; 4	6; 3
2	(Romania) (Serbia)	Raluca Olaru; Jelena Janković	3; 6	4; 6
3	(Romania) (Serbia)	Mădălina Gojnea / Monica Niculescu; Jelena Janković / Ana Timotić	4; 6	1; 6

=== Ukraine vs. Poland ===
Ukraine
2
TC Lokomotiv, Plovdiv, Bulgaria
21 April 2007
Red clay (outdoors)

Poland
1

			1	2	3
1	(Ukraine) (Poland)	Yuliana Fedak; Marta Domachowska	7^{7} 6^{3}	7^{7} 6^{5}
2	(Ukraine) (Poland)	Alona Bondarenko; Agnieszka Radwańska	4; 6	3; 6
3	(Ukraine) (Poland)	Alona Bondarenko / Kateryna Bondarenko; Marta Domachowska / Urszula Radwańska	3; 6	6; 3	6; 3

== Fifth to Seventh play-off ==
The second placed teams of each pool were placed against each other in two ties. The winner of each tie was allocated fifth place in the Group while the losers were allocated seventh.

=== Switzerland vs. Slovenia ===
Switzerland
2
TC Lokomotiv, Plovdiv, Bulgaria
21 April 2007
Red clay (outdoors)

Slovenia
0

			1	2	3
1	(Switzerland) (Slovenia)	Emmanuelle Gagliardi; Tadeja Majerič	6; 0	6; 0
2	(Switzerland) (Slovenia)	Patty Schnyder; Polona Hercog	6; 3	3; 6	6; 2
3	(Switzerland) (Slovenia)					not played

=== Belarus vs. Luxembourg ===
Belarus
2
TC Lokomotiv, Plovdiv, Bulgaria
21 April 2007
Red clay (outdoors)

Luxembourg
1

			1	2	3
1	(Belarus) (Luxembourg)	Ksenia Milevskaya; Lynn Philippe	6; 2	6; 2
2	(Belarus) (Luxembourg)	Tatiana Poutchek; Anne Kremer	1; 6	2; 6
3	(Belarus) (Luxembourg)	Ksenia Milevskaya / Anastasiya Yakimova; Anne Kremer / Lynn Philippe	3; 6	6; 3	6; 3

== Ninth to Eleventh play-off ==
The third placed teams of each pool were placed against each other in two ties. The winner of each tie was allocated ninth place in the Group while the losers were allocated eleventh.

=== Denmark vs. Hungary ===
Denmark
1
TC Lokomotiv, Plovdiv, Bulgaria
21 April 2007
Red clay (outdoors)

Hungary
2

			1	2	3
1	(Denmark) (Hungary)	Karen Barbat; Lucia Batta	6; 3	6; 2
2	(Denmark) (Hungary)	Hanne Skak Jensen; Kira Nagy	3; 6	0; 6
3	(Denmark) (Hungary)	Eva Dyrberg / Hanne Skak Jensen; Kira Nagy / Ágnes Szávay	4; 6	7; 5	0; 6

=== Sweden vs. Great Britain ===
Sweden
3
TC Lokomotiv, Plovdiv, Bulgaria
21 April 2007
Red clay (outdoors)

Great Britain
0

			1	2	3
1	(Sweden) (United Kingdom)	Johanna Larsson; Naomi Cavaday	6; 2	1; 6	6; 1
2	(Sweden) (United Kingdom)	Sofia Arvidsson; Anne Keothavong	6; 3	7; 5
3	(Sweden) (United Kingdom)	Mari Andersson / Johanna Larsson; Elena Baltacha / Claire Curran	6; 0	6; 1

== Relegation play-offs ==
The last placed teams of each pool were placed against each other in two ties. The losing team of the rounds were relegated to Group II for next year.

=== Netherlands vs. Estonia ===
Netherlands
2
TC Lokomotiv, Plovdiv, Bulgaria
21 April 2007
Red clay (outdoors)

Estonia
1

			1	2	3
1	(Netherlands) (Estonia)	Nicole Thijssen; Anett Schutting	6; 1	6; 1
2	(Netherlands) (Estonia)	Michaëlla Krajicek; Margit Rüütel	6; 2	7; 5
3	(Netherlands) (Estonia)					not played

=== Lithuania vs. Bulgaria ===
Lithuania
0
TC Lokomotiv, Plovdiv, Bulgaria
21 April 2007
Red clay (outdoors)

Bulgaria
2

			1	2	3
1	(Lithuania) (Bulgaria)	Julija Gotovskytė; Dia Evtimova	1; 6	0; 3		retired
2	(Lithuania) (Bulgaria)	Lina Stančiūtė; Tsvetana Pironkova	1; 6	7^{7} 6^{5}	2; 6
3	(Lithuania) (Bulgaria)					not played

== Final placements ==
Placing	Teams	
Promoted	Serbia	Ukraine
Third	Romania	Poland
Fifth	Switzerland	Belarus
Seventh	Slovenia	Luxembourg
Ninth	Hungary	Sweden
Eleventh	Denmark	Great Britain
Thirteenth	Netherlands	Bulgaria
Relegated	Estonia	Lithuania

- Serbia and Ukraine advanced to the World Group II play-offs. The Serbians were drawn against Slovakia, and they lost 1–4, which thus caused them to be relegated back to Group I for the next year. The Ukrainians, however, were drawn against Australia, and they won 4–1. They thus advanced to World Group II.
- Estonia and Lithuania were relegated down to Europe/Africa Zone Group II for the next year. They respectively placed first and second in the same pool, and thus both advanced to the advancement play-offs. Estonia won theirs, and thus proceeded back to Group I for 2009, while Lithuania lost and therefore remained in Group II.

== See also ==
- Fed Cup structure
