= 2007 Fed Cup Europe/Africa Zone Group I – Pool C =

Group C of the 2007 Fed Cup Europe/Africa Zone Group I

Group C of the 2007 Fed Cup Europe/Africa Zone Group I was one of four pools in the Europe/Africa Zone Group I of the 2007 Fed Cup. Four teams competed in a round robin competition, with the top team and the bottom team proceeding to their respective sections of the play-offs: the top team played for advancement to the World Group II Play-offs, while the bottom team faced potential relegation to Group II.

		(Serbia) SRB	(Slovenia) SLO	(Sweden) SWE	(Estonia) EST	RR; W–L	Set; W–L	Game; W–L	Standings
24	Serbia		2–1	1–2	3–0	2–1	15–8	118–85	1
28	Slovenia	1–2		2–1	3–0	2–1	14–8	107–85	2
29	Sweden	2–1	1–2		3–0	2–1	12–11	104–107	3
34	Estonia	0–3	0–3	0–3		0–3	4–18	72–124	4

== Serbia vs. Estonia ==
Serbia
3
TC Lokomotiv, Plovdiv, Bulgaria
18 April 2007
Red clay (outdoors)

Estonia
0

			1	2	3
1	(Serbia) (Estonia)	Vojislava Lukić; Anett Schutting	6; 2	6; 1
2	(Serbia) (Estonia)	Jelena Janković; Margit Rüütel	6; 1	6; 3
3	(Serbia) (Estonia)	Vojislava Lukić / Ana Timotić; Margit Rüütel / Anett Schutting	6; 2	5; 7	6; 3

== Slovenia vs. Sweden ==
Slovenia
2
TC Lokomotiv, Plovdiv, Bulgaria
18 April 2007
Red clay (outdoors)

Sweden
1

			1	2	3
1	(Slovenia) (Sweden)	Maša Zec-Peškirič; Johanna Larsson	6; 2	6; 2
2	(Slovenia) (Sweden)	Andreja Klepač; Sofia Arvidsson	3; 6	6; 3	4; 6
3	(Slovenia) (Sweden)	Andreja Klepač / Maša Zec-Peškirič; Sofia Arvidsson / Johanna Larsson	6; 3	6; 3

== Serbia vs. Sweden ==
Serbia
1
TC Lokomotiv, Plovdiv, Bulgaria
19 April 2007
Red clay (outdoors)

Sweden
2

			1	2	3
1	(Serbia) (Sweden)	Vojislava Lukić; Johanna Larsson	6; 2	4; 6	5; 7
2	(Serbia) (Sweden)	Jelena Janković; Sofia Arvidsson	6; 2	6; 0
3	(Serbia) (Sweden)	Jelena Janković / Ana Timotić; Sofia Arvidsson / Johanna Larsson	7; 5	3; 6	1; 6

== Slovenia vs. Estonia ==
Slovenia
3
TC Lokomotiv, Plovdiv, Bulgaria
19 April 2007
Red clay (outdoors)

Estonia
0

			1	2	3
1	(Slovenia) (Estonia)	Maša Zec-Peškirič; Anett Kaasik	6; 1	6; 1
2	(Slovenia) (Estonia)	Andreja Klepač; Margit Rüütel	6; 3	7; 5
3	(Slovenia) (Estonia)	Polona Hercog / Tadeja Majerič; Anett Kaasik / Margit Rüütel	1; 6	6; 1	6; 4

== Serbia vs. Slovenia ==
Serbia
2
TC Lokomotiv, Plovdiv, Bulgaria
20 April 2007
Red clay (outdoors)

Slovenia
1

			1	2	3
1	(Serbia) (Slovenia)	Ana Timotić; Maša Zec-Peškirič	3; 6	6; 4	0; 6
2	(Serbia) (Slovenia)	Jelena Janković; Andreja Klepač	6; 1	6; 0
3	(Serbia) (Slovenia)	Jelena Janković / Ana Timotić; Andreja Klepač / Maša Zec-Peškirič	3; 6	6; 2	9; 7

== Sweden vs. Estonia ==
Sweden
3
TC Lokomotiv, Plovdiv, Bulgaria
20 April 2007
Red clay (outdoors)

Estonia
0

			1	2	3
1	(Sweden) (Estonia)	Mari Andersson; Anett Schutting	1; 6	6; 2	6; 3
2	(Sweden) (Estonia)	Sofia Arvidsson; Margit Rüütel	5; 7	6; 1	8; 6
3	(Sweden) (Estonia)	Mari Andersson / Johanna Larsson; Anett Kaasik / Anett Schutting	7; 5	6; 2

== See also ==
- Fed Cup structure
