= 2007 Fed Cup Europe/Africa Zone Group II – Pool A =

International tennis competition

Group A of the 2007 Fed Cup Europe/Africa Zone Group II was one of two pools in the Europe/Africa Zone Group II of the 2007 Fed Cup. Three teams competed in a round robin competition, with the top team and the bottom two teams proceeding to their respective sections of the play-offs: the top teams played for advancement to Group I, while the bottom team faced potential relegation to Group III.

		(South Africa) RSA	(Finland) FIN	(Greece) GRE	RR; W–L	Set; W–L	Game; W–L	Standings
40	South Africa		2–1	3–0	2–0	11–3	73–48	1
56	Finland	1–2		0–2	0–2	2–9	44–59	3
61	Greece	0–3	2–0		1–1	5–6	47–57	2

== South Africa vs. Finland ==
South Africa
2
National Tennis Centre, Vacoas-Phoenix, Mauritius
18 April 2007
Hard (outdoors)

Finland
1

			1	2	3
1	(South Africa) (Finland)	Lizaan du Plessis; Essi Laine	7; 5	6; 1
2	(South Africa) (Finland)	Surina De Beer; Piia Suomalainen	6; 1	1; 6	1; 6
3	(South Africa) (Finland)	Kelly Anderson / Surina De Beer; Essi Laine / Piia Suomalainen	6; 4	6; 4

== South Africa vs. Greece ==
South Africa
3
National Tennis Centre, Vacoas-Phoenix, Mauritius
19 April 2007
Hard (outdoors)

Greece
0

			1	2	3
1	(South Africa) (Greece)	Lizaan du Plessis; Anna Koumantou	6; 4	6; 1
2	(South Africa) (Greece)	Surina De Beer; Anna Gerasimou	4; 6	6; 1	6; 2
3	(South Africa) (Greece)	Kelly Anderson / Lizaan du Plessis; Anna Gerasimou / Asimina Kaplani	6; 4	6; 3

== Finland vs. Greece ==
Finland
0
National Tennis Centre, Vacoas-Phoenix, Mauritius
20 April 2007
Hard (outdoors)

Greece
2

			1	2	3
1	(Finland) (Greece)	Essi Laine; Anna Koumantou	4; 6	5; 7
2	(Finland) (Greece)	Piia Suomalainen; Anna Gerasimou	3; 6	5; 7
3	(Finland) (Greece)	Essi Laine / Piia Suomalainen; Anna Gerasimou / Anna Koumantou				not played

== See also ==
- Fed Cup structure
