= Anett Schutting =

Estonian tennis player

- Country (sports): Estonia
- Born: 24 August 1991 (age 33); Tallinn, Estonia
- Height: 1.70 m (5 ft 7 in)
- Prize money: US$4,608

Singles
- Career record: 18–14
- Career titles: 0
- Highest ranking: 679 (26 July 2010)

Doubles
- Career record: 3–9
- Career titles: 0
- Highest ranking: 856 (12 July 2010)

Team competitions
- Fed Cup: 3–7

Anett Schutting (born 24 August 1991 in Tallinn) is an Estonian former tennis player. On 25 October 2010, she reached her best singles ranking of world No. 592. On 18 July 2011, she peaked at No. 562 in the doubles rankings.

Schutting has a 3–7 record for Estonia in Fed Cup competition.

== ITF finals ==
=== Singles (0–1) ===
Legend $100,000 tournaments $75,000 tournaments $50,000 tournaments $25,000 tournaments $10,000 tournaments	Finals by surface Hard (0–0) Clay (0–1) Grass (0–0) Carpet (0–0)

Result	Date	Tournament	Surface	Opponent	Score
Loss	3 August 2009	ITF Savitaipale, Finland	Clay	(Finland) Emma Laine	5–7, 1–6

=== Doubles (0–1) ===
Legend $100,000 tournaments $75,000 tournaments $50,000 tournaments $25,000 tournaments $10,000 tournaments	Finals by surface Hard (0–1) Clay (0–0) Grass (0–0) Carpet (0–0)

Result	Date	Tournament	Surface	Partner	Opponents	Score
Loss	22 February 2010	ITF Portimão, Portugal	Hard	(Belgium) Gally De Wael	(Poland) Justyna Jegiołka (Poland) Barbara Sobaszkiewicz	6–3, 6–7^{(6)}, [5–10]

== Fed Cup participation ==
=== Singles ===
Edition	Stage	Date	Location	Against	Surface	Opponent	W/L	Score
2007 Fed Cup; Europe/Africa Zone Group I	R/R	18 April 2007	Plovdiv, Bulgaria	Serbia	Clay	(Serbia) Vojislava Lukić	L	2–6, 1–6
2007 Fed Cup; Europe/Africa Zone Group I	R/R	20 April 2007	Plovdiv, Bulgaria	Sweden	Clay	(Sweden) Michaela Johansson	L	6–1, 2–6, 3–6
2007 Fed Cup; Europe/Africa Zone Group I	P/O	21 April 2007	Plovdiv, Bulgaria	Netherlands	Clay	(Netherlands) Nicole Thijssen	L	1–6, 1–6
2008 Fed Cup; Europe/Africa Zone Group II	R/R	1 February 2008	Tallinn, Estonia	(Republic of Ireland) Ireland	Hard (i)	(Republic of Ireland) Anne Mall	W	6–2, 6–1

=== Doubles ===
Edition	Stage	Date	Location	Against	Surface	Partner	Opponents	W/L	Score
2007 Fed Cup; Europe/Africa Zone Group I	R/R	18 April 2007	Plovdiv, Bulgaria	Serbia	Clay	(Estonia) Margit Rüütel	(Serbia) Vojislava Lukić (Serbia) Ana Timotić	L	2–6, 7–5, 3–6
2007 Fed Cup; Europe/Africa Zone Group I	R/R	20 April 2007	Plovdiv, Bulgaria	Sweden	Clay	(Estonia) Anett Kaasik	(Sweden) Mari Andersson (Sweden) Johanna Larsson	L	5–7, 2–6
2008 Fed Cup; Europe/Africa Zone Group II	R/R	1 February 2008	Tallinn, Estonia	(Republic of Ireland) Ireland	Hard (i)	(Estonia) Margit Rüütel	(Republic of Ireland) Yvonne Doyle (Republic of Ireland) Kelly Liggan	W	6–1, 6–3
2008 Fed Cup; Europe/Africa Zone Group II	P/O	2 February 2008	Tallinn, Estonia	South Africa	Hard (i)	(Estonia) Margit Rüütel	(South Africa) Kelly Anderson (South Africa) Tarryn Rudman	W	7–5, 7–6^{(7)}
2009 Fed Cup; Europe/Africa Zone Group I	R/R	5 February 2009	Tallinn, Estonia	Croatia	Hard (i)	(Estonia) Margit Rüütel	(Croatia) Jelena Kostanić Tošić (Croatia) Ana Vrljić	L	4–6, 7–5, 4–6
2010 Fed Cup; World Group II	WG2	7 February 2010	Tallinn, Estonia	Argentina	Hard (i)	(Estonia) Margit Rüütel	(Argentina) Mailen Auroux (Argentina) María Irigoyen	L	5–7, 4–6
