= 2008 Fed Cup Europe/Africa Zone Group II – play-offs =

International tennis competition play-offs

The play-offs of the 2008 Fed Cup Europe/Africa Zone Group II were the final stages of the Group II Zonal Competition involving teams from Europe and Africa. Using the positions determined in their pools, the seven teams faced off to determine their placing in the 2008 Fed Cup Europe/Africa Zone Group II. The top two teams advanced to Group I, and the bottom two teams were relegated down to the Group III for the next year.

Placing	Pool A	Pool B
1	Bosnia and Herzegovina	Estonia
2	South Africa	Lithuania
3	Turkey	Greece
4		Ireland

== Promotion play-offs ==
The top two teams of each pool were placed against each other in two head-to-head rounds. The winner of the rounds advanced to Group I for next year.

=== Bosnia and Herzegovina vs. Lithuania ===
Bosnia and Herzegovina
2
Coral Tennis Club, Tallinn, Estonia
2 February 2008
Greenset hard (indoors)

Lithuania
0

			1	2	3
1	(Bosnia and Herzegovina) (Lithuania)	Mervana Jugić-Salkić; Aurelija Misevičiūtė	6; 1	6; 4
2	(Bosnia and Herzegovina) (Lithuania)	Sandra Martinović; Lina Stančiūtė	6; 1	6; 2
3	(Bosnia and Herzegovina) (Lithuania)					not played

=== South Africa vs. Estonia ===
South Africa
0
Coral Tennis Club, Tallinn, Estonia
2 February 2008
Greenset hard (indoors)

Estonia
3

			1	2	3
1	(South Africa) (Estonia)	Tarryn Rudman; Maret Ani	1; 6	2; 6
2	(South Africa) (Estonia)	Kelly Anderson; Kaia Kanepi	1; 6	2; 6
3	(South Africa) (Estonia)	Kelly Anderson / Tarryn Rudman; Margit Rüütel / Anett Schutting	5; 7	6^{7} 7^{9}

== Relegation play-offs ==
Because there was one extra player in Pool B, the last-placed team of that pool (Ireland) was automatically relegated down to Group III. The third-placed teams of each pool were then placed against each other in a tie, where the losing team would join the Irish in relegation.

=== Turkey vs. Greece ===
Turkey
2
Coral Tennis Club, Tallinn, Estonia
2 February 2008
Greenset hard (indoors)

Greece
1

			1	2	3
1	(Turkey) (Greece)	Çağla Büyükakçay; Eirini Georgatou	3; 6	6; 4	6; 3
2	(Turkey) (Greece)	Pemra Özgen; Anna Gerasimou	1; 6	2; 6
3	(Turkey) (Greece)	Çağla Büyükakçay / Pemra Özgen; Anna Gerasimou / Anna Koumantou	6; 4	6^{6} 7^{8}	6; 4

== Final Placements ==
Placing	Teams
Promoted	Bosnia and Herzegovina
Promoted	Estonia
Third	Lithuania
Third	South Africa
Fifth	Turkey
Relegated	Greece
Relegated	Ireland

- Bosnia and Herzegovina and Estonia advanced to the Europe/Africa Zone Group I for the next year. The Bosnians and Herzegovinians placed twelfth overall, while the Estonians placed first and thus advanced to the World Group II play-offs.
- Greece and Ireland were relegated down to Europe/Africa Zone Group III for the next year, where they respectively placed first and third in the same pool of five. The Greeks thus advanced back to Group II for 2010.

== See also ==
- Fed Cup structure
