= 2007 Fed Cup Europe/Africa Zone =

Subsection of tennis competition

The Europe/Africa Zone was one of three zones of regional competition in the 2007 Fed Cup.

== Group I ==
- Venue: TC Lokomotiv, Plovdiv, Bulgaria (outdoor clay)
- Date: 18–21 April

The sixteen teams were divided into four pools of four. The top teams of each pool played-off against each other to determine which two nations progress to World Group II Play-offs. The four nations coming last played-off against each other to decide which teams are relegated to Group II for 2008.

=== Pools ===
	Pool A	ROU	SUI	DEN	NED
1	Romania (2–1)		2–1	2–1	1–2
2	Switzerland (2–1)	1–2		3–0	3–0
3	Denmark (1–2)	1–2	0–3		2–1
4	Netherlands (1–2)	2–1	0–3	1–2	

	Pool B	UKR	BLR	HUN	LTU
1	Ukraine (3–0)		3–0	2–1	3–0
2	Belarus (2–1)	0–3		2–1	2–1
3	Hungary (1–2)	1–2	1–2		2–1
4	Lithuania (0–3)	0–3	1–2	1–2	

	Pool C	SRB	SLO	SWE	EST
1	Serbia (2–1)		2–1	1–2	3–0
2	Slovenia (2–1)	1–2		2–1	3–0
3	Sweden (2–1)	2–1	1–2		3–0
4	Estonia (0–3)	0–3	0–3	0–3	

	Pool D	POL	LUX	GBR	BUL
1	Poland (3–0)		3–0	3–0	3–0
2	Luxembourg (2–1)	0–3		2–1	2–1
3	Great Britain (1–2)	0–3	1–2		3–0
4	Bulgaria (0–3)	0–3	1–2	0–3	

=== Play-offs ===
Placing	A Team	Score	B/C Team
Promotion	Romania	1–2	Serbia
5th–8th	Switzerland	2–0	Slovenia
9th–12th	Denmark	1–2	Hungary
Relegation	Netherlands	2–0	Estonia

Placing	B/C Team	Score	D Team
Promotion	Ukraine	2–1	Poland
5th–8th	Belarus	2–1	Luxembourg
9th–12th	Sweden	3–0	Great Britain
Relegation	Lithuania	0–2	Bulgaria

- Serbia and Ukraine advanced to the 2007 World Group II Play-offs.
- Estonia and Lithuania were relegated to Group II for 2008.

== Group II ==
- Venue: National Tennis Centre, Vacoas-Phoenix, Mauritius (outdoor hard)
- Date: 17–20 April

The seven teams were divided into one pool of three teams and one pool of four. The top two teams of each pool played-off against each other to decide which two nations progress to Group I for 2008. The four nations coming third in each pool then played-off to determine which team would join the fourth-placed team from the four-team pool in being relegated down to Group III for 2008.

=== Pools ===
	Pool A	RSA	GRE	FIN
1	South Africa (2–0)		3–0	2–1
2	Greece (1–1)	0–3		2–0
3	Finland (0–2)	1–2	0–2	

	Pool B	POR	GEO	BIH	NOR
1	Portugal (3–0)		3–0	2–0	2–0
2	Georgia (2–1)	0–3		2–0	2–0
3	Bosnia and Herzegovina (1–2)	0–2	0–2		3–0
4	Norway (0–3)	0–2	0–2	0–3	

=== Play-offs ===
Placing	A Team	Score	B Team
Promotion	South Africa	1–2	Georgia
Promotion	Greece	0–2	Portugal
Relegation	Finland	0–2	Bosnia and Herzegovina
Relegation		N/A	Norway

- Portugal and Georgia advanced to the 2007 World Group II Play-offs.
- Finland and Norway were relegated to Group II for 2007.

== Group III ==
- Venue: National Tennis Centre, Vacoas-Phoenix, Mauritius (outdoor hard)
- Date: 23–27 April

The ten teams were divided into two pools of five. The top team of each pool progressed to Group II for 2008.

=== Pools ===
	Pool A	TUR	LIE	MRI	EGY	AZE
1	Turkey (4–0)		3–0	2–1	2–0	3–0
2	Liechtenstein (3–1)	0–3		3–0	2–1	3–0
3	Mauritius (2–2)	1–2	0–3		2–1	3–0
4	Egypt (1–3)	0–2	1–2	1–2		3–0
5	Azerbaijan (0–4)	0–3	0–3	0–3	0–3	

	Pool B	IRL	LAT	MNE	MLT	MDA
1	Ireland (4–0)		2–1	2–1	3–0	3–0
2	Latvia (3–1)	1–2		3–0	3–0	2–0
3	Montenegro (2–2)	1–2	0–3		2–0	3–0
4	Malta (1–3)	0–3	0–3	0–2		3–0
5	Moldova (0–4)	0–3	0–2	0–3	0–3	

- Turkey and Ireland advanced to Group II for 2009.

== See also ==
- Fed Cup structure
