= 2008 Fed Cup Europe/Africa Zone Group II – Pool B =

Group B of the 2008 Fed Cup Europe/Africa Zone Group II was one of two pools in the Europe/Africa Zone Group II of the 2008 Fed Cup. Three teams competed in a round robin competition, with the top team and the bottom two teams proceeding to their respective sections of the play-offs: the top teams played for advancement to Group I, while the bottom team faced potential relegation to Group III.

		(Estonia) EST	(Lithuania) LTU	(Republic of Ireland) IRL	(Greece) GRE	RR; W–L	Set; W–L	Game; W–L	Standings
51	Estonia		3–0	3–0	3–0	3–0	18–1	115–45	1
53	Lithuania	0–3		2–1	2–0	2–1	9–10	90–99	2
59	Ireland	0–3	1–2		1–2	0–3	4–14	56–98	4
61	Greece	0–3	0–2	2–1		1–2	6–12	71–90	3

== Estonia vs. Greece ==
Estonia
3
Coral Tennis Club, Tallinn, Estonia
30 January 2008
Greenset hard (indoors)

Greece
0

			1	2	3
1	(Estonia) (Greece)	Margit Rüütel; Anna Koumantou	6; 2	6; 1
2	(Estonia) (Greece)	Kaia Kanepi; Anna Gerasimou	6; 2	6; 1
3	(Estonia) (Greece)	Maret Ani / Kaia Kanepi; Anna Gerasimou / Anna Koumantou	6; 3	6; 4

== Lithuania vs. Ireland ==
Lithuania
2
Coral Tennis Club, Tallinn, Estonia
30 January 2008
Greenset hard (indoors)

Ireland
1

			1	2	3
1	(Lithuania) (Republic of Ireland)	Aurelija Misevičiūtė; Anne Mall	6; 2	7; 5
2	(Lithuania) (Republic of Ireland)	Lina Stančiūtė; Kelly Liggan	6; 4	6; 2
3	(Lithuania) (Republic of Ireland)	Aurelija Misevičiūtė / Lina Stančiūtė; Yvonne Doyle / Kelly Liggan	3; 6	6^{4} 7^{7}

== Estonia vs. Lithuania ==
Estonia
3
Coral Tennis Club, Tallinn, Estonia
31 January 2008
Greenset hard (indoors)

Lithuania
0

			1	2	3
1	(Estonia) (Lithuania)	Margit Rüütel; Aurelija Misevičiūtė	5; 7	6; 1	6; 1
2	(Estonia) (Lithuania)	Kaia Kanepi; Lina Stančiūtė	7^{7} 6^{2}	7^{7} 6^{3}
3	(Estonia) (Lithuania)	Maret Ani / Kaia Kanepi; Greta Jokšytė / Aurelija Misevičiūtė	6; 1	6; 1

== Ireland vs. Greece ==
Ireland
1
Coral Tennis Club, Tallinn, Estonia
31 January 2008
Greenset hard (indoors)

Greece
2

			1	2	3
1	(Republic of Ireland) (Greece)	Yvonne Doyle; Eirini Georgatou	0; 6	2; 6
2	(Republic of Ireland) (Greece)	Kelly Liggan; Anna Gerasimou	2; 6	5; 7
3	(Republic of Ireland) (Greece)	Yvonne Doyle / Kelly Liggan; Anna Gerasimou / Anna Koumantou	6; 2	6; 1

== Estonia vs. Ireland ==
Estonia
3
Coral Tennis Club, Tallinn, Estonia
1 February 2008
Greenset hard (indoors)

Ireland
0

			1	2	3
1	(Estonia) (Republic of Ireland)	Anett Schutting; Anne Mall	6; 2	6; 1
2	(Estonia) (Republic of Ireland)	Maret Ani; Kelly Liggan	6; 1	6; 1
3	(Estonia) (Republic of Ireland)	Margit Rüütel / Anett Schutting; Yvonne Doyle / Kelly Liggan	6; 1	6; 3

== Lithuania vs. Greece ==
Lithuania
2
Coral Tennis Club, Tallinn, Estonia
1 February 2008
Greenset hard (indoors)

Greece
0

			1	2	3
1	(Lithuania) (Greece)	Aurelija Misevičiūtė; Anna Koumantou	4; 6	6; 2	7^{7} 6^{5}
2	(Lithuania) (Greece)	Lina Stančiūtė; Anna Gerasimou	7^{7} 6^{4}	3; 6	6; 4
3	(Lithuania) (Greece)					not played

== See also ==
- Fed Cup structure
