= Vojislava Lukić =

Serbian tennis player

Vojislava Lukić Војислава Лукић
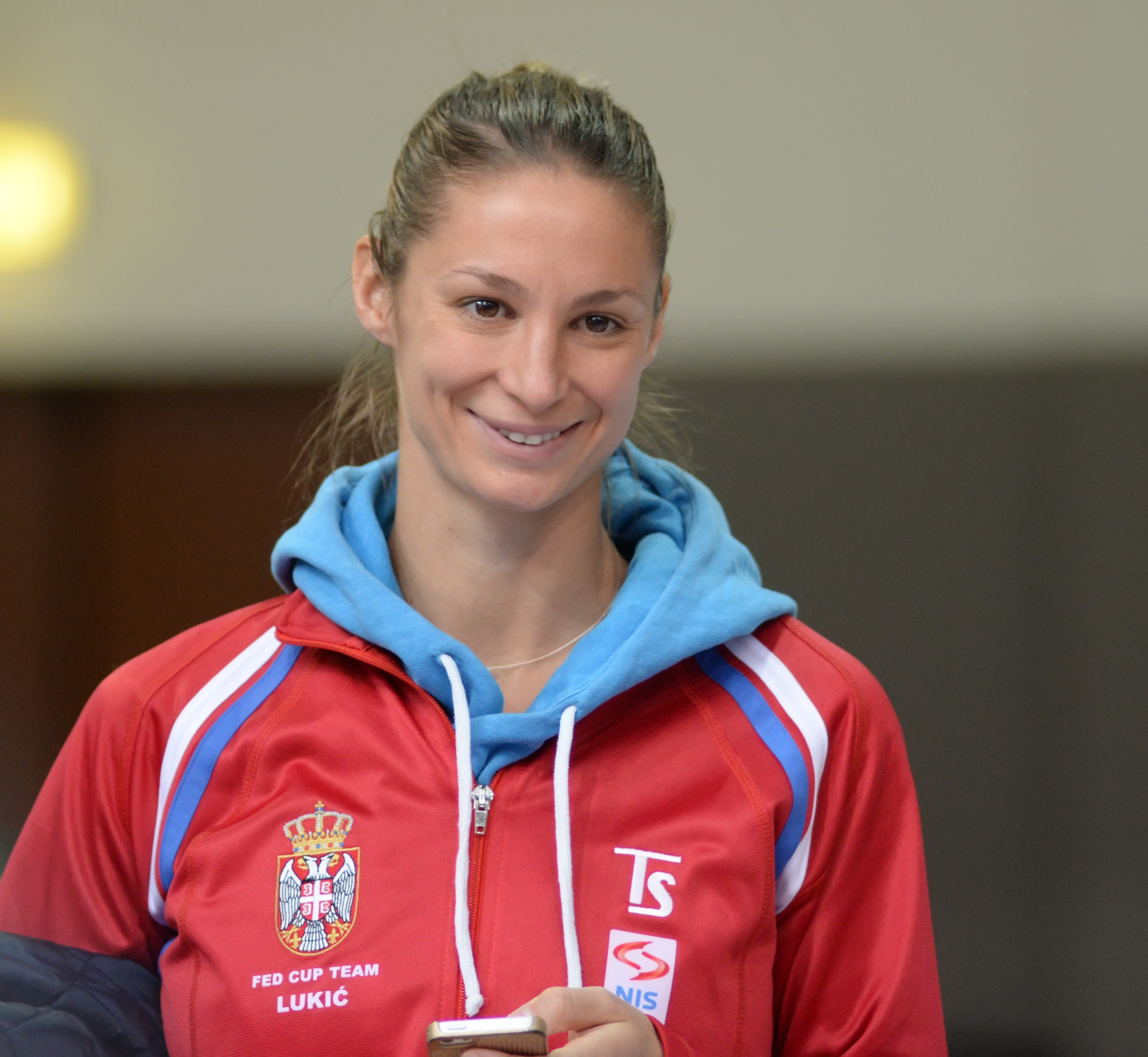
- Lukić at 2015 Fed Cup
- Country (sports): Serbia
- Residence: Subotica
- Born: 31 March 1987 (age 38); Subotica, Socialist Federal Republic of Yugoslavia
- Height: 1.75 m (5 ft 9 in)
- Turned pro: 2004
- Retired: 2016
- Plays: Right–handed (two–handed backhand)
- Prize money: $71,753

Singles
- Career record: 206–114
- Career titles: 8 ITF
- Highest ranking: No. 203 (20 August 2007)

Grand Slam singles results
- US Open: Q1 (2007)

Doubles
- Career record: 65–53
- Career titles: 5 ITF
- Highest ranking: No. 223 (8 October 2007)

Team competitions
- Fed Cup: 2–2

Vojislava Lukić (Serbian Cyrillic: Војислава Лукић, pronounced [lǔːkitɕ]; born 31 March 1987) is a Serbian former tennis player.

Born and raised in Subotica, she achieved her highest WTA rankings as world No. 203 in singles on 20 August 2007, and No. 223 in doubles on 8 October 2007. Lukić won eight ITF titles in singles and five in doubles. She also played for Serbia Fed Cup team in 2007, alongside Jelena Janković, Ana Jovanović and Ana Timotić.

In 2008, after an ITF tournament in Alphen aan den Rijn, Lukić temporarily withdrew from professional tennis. Although she played doubles at the ITF tournament in Dubai in 2009 partnering with Bojana Jovanovski, she did not make a full comeback until 2012. In the meantime, Lukić founded her own tennis school for girls and worked as a television presenter and model.

== Family and early life ==
Lukić was born to Momčilo and Sonja Lukić in Subotica. She has one sister, Milka. Lukić trained gymnastics as a child, and was very successful in pioneer age group, but dropped her gymnastic pursuit for tennis.

Other than her native Serbian language, she speaks English, German, French and Romanian.

== Tennis career ==
Lukić started playing tennis aged eight and was coached by Eduard Pană. She is former European U–14 champion and world No. 8 in junior concurrence. One of her greatest junior achievements were the quarterfinals of the 2004 Wimbledon Championships, several Orange Bowl appearances, and wins over players such as Lucie Šafářová, Alla Kudryavtseva, Kateryna Bondarenko, Olga Govortsova and Monica Niculescu.

Lukić turned professional in 2004, and reached her first ITF doubles final in 2005. She won three ITF singles titles in 2006, all in Romania – in Pitești, Mediaș and Bucharest, and made two final appearances in doubles. The following year, Lukić collected her fourth ITF title in Attaleia, Turkey, beating Anastasija Sevastova 6–3, 7–6, and three doubles titles. She also made her only appearances at both WTA Tour and Grand Slam tournaments at, respectively, the 2007 İstanbul Cup and the 2007 US Open. In Istanbul, she lost in the first qualification round 6–2, 6–3, 5–7 to Urszula Radwańska, while at the US Open she was defeated by Galina Voskoboeva 6–4, 6–1, also in the first qualification round.

Lukić was also member of Serbia Fed Cup team in 2007, alongside Jelena Janković, Ana Jovanović and Ana Timotić, in a 2007 Fed Cup Europe/Africa Group I C match against Estonia. She won her singles match against Anett Schutting 6–1, 6–2, and her doubles match against Schutting and Margit Rüütel, partnering Timotić. She then lost her singles match versus Johanna Larsson in the round robin versus Sweden. In the quarterfinals of World Group II Playoffs, Lukić lost to former world No. 5 player Daniela Hantuchová 0–6, 2–6.

In 2008, Lukić stated she had lost the faith in her game, and announced retirement. She began working as a host of Total Tennis, the RTS television program about tennis, and opened her own tennis school for girls. In December 2009, Lukić played doubles at the ITF tournament in Dubai partnering with Bojana Jovanovski. They lost 4–6, 2–6 to Julia Görges and Oksana Kalashnikova in the second round.

Due to her return to amateur status, Lukić met the playing criteria of the National Collegiate Athletic Association, and began playing for the women's tennis team of the Barry University. However, she left the team shortly after and resumed her professional career after three years. Lukić qualified for the ITF tournament in Sumter, South Carolina, but lost in the second round of the main draw. Following a first–round loss at the ITF event in El Paso, Texas, she won the tournament in Bethany Beach, Delaware, by defeating Sanaz Marand 6–2, 7–5. At the ITF event in Williamsburg, Virginia, Lukić won her sixth career title by beating Caroline Doyle 6–1, 6–3.

In the 2014 summer, Lukić made a comeback after nearly a two-year absence, playing in a $10k event in Sharm El Sheikh where she lost her first-round match to eventual finalist Jan Abaza, 2–6, 1–6. She decided in agreement with her new coach, Mohamed El Ghazawy, that she would train and play there until the end of the year, with plans to play outside of Egypt the following year. In August, she won her first ITF doubles title (partnering Haine Ogata) in almost seven years and reached her first singles final in more than two years, losing 4–6, 1–6 to Valeriya Strakhova. Following another final in early September, which she lost 7–6, 4–6, 3–6 to Anna Morgina, Lukić again faced Morgina in a finals rematch in the next tournament. This time she won 6–4, 6–3 for her first singles title since making a comeback.

In 2016, after her retirement from tennis, Lukić has been named National Coach of the British Virgin Islands.

== Other work and endeavours ==
In early 2009, Lukić did a cover spread for the February 2009 issue of the FHM magazine in Serbia. During her temporary retirement, it was speculated that Lukić had her eyes on acting career and that she was aided by former Hollywood star Don Johnson.

During her retirement, from 2008 to 2012, Lukić worked as a presenter of Total Tennis, a tennis-related television programme airing on the Radio Television of Serbia, and founded her own tennis school for girls.

== ITF finals ==
=== Singles (8–8) ===
Legend $25,000 tournaments $15,000 tournaments $10,000 tournaments	Finals by surface Hard (3–6) Clay (5–2)

Outcome	No.	Date	Tournament	Surface	Opponent	Score
Winner	1.	21 May 2006	Pitești, Romania	Clay	(Kazakhstan) Amina Rakhim	7–6^{(3)}, 5–7, 6–4
Winner	2.	18 June 2006	Mediaș, Romania	Clay	(Romania) Diana-Andreea Gae	6–3, 6–1
Runner-up	1.	2 July 2006	Galați, Romania	Clay	(Romania) Anamaria-Alexandra Sere	2–6, 6–7^{(5)}
Winner	3.	23 July 2006	Bucharest, Romania	Clay	(Germany) Elisa Peth	6–1, 6–0
Winner	4.	13 May 2007	Antalya, Turkey	Hard	(Latvia) Anastasija Sevastova	6–3, 7–6^{(3)}
Winner	5.	17 June 2012	Bethany Beach, United States	Clay	(United States) Sanaz Marand	6–2, 7–5
Winner	6.	24 June 2012	Williamsburg, United States	Clay	(United States) Caroline Doyle	6–1, 6–3
Runner-up	2.	22 July 2012	Darmstadt, Germany	Clay	(Slovakia) Anna Karolína Schmiedlová	1–6, 2–6
Runner-up	3.	10 August 2014	Sharm El Sheikh, Egypt	Hard	(Ukraine) Valeriya Strakhova	4–6, 1–6
Runner-up	4.	7 September 2014	Sharm El Sheikh, Egypt	Hard	(Russia) Anna Morgina	7–6^{(2)}, 4–6, 3–6
Winner	7.	14 September 2014	Sharm El Sheikh, Egypt	Hard	(Russia) Anna Morgina	6–4, 6–3
Runner-up	5.	12 October 2014	Sharm El Sheikh, Egypt	Hard	(Spain) Nuria Párrizas Díaz	4–6, 3–6
Winner	8.	23 November 2014	Sharm El Sheikh, Egypt	Hard	(Serbia) Nina Stojanović	7–6^{(5)}, 6–7^{(3)}, 6–3
Runner-up	6.	14 December 2014	Sharm El Sheikh, Egypt	Hard	(Belgium) Klaartje Liebens	7–6^{(3)}, 2–6, 4–6
Runner-up	7.	9 May 2015	Obregón, Mexico	Hard	(Mexico) Marcela Zacarías	4–6, 7–5, 1–2 ret.
Runner-up	8.	7 June 2015	Ariake, Japan	Hard	(Japan) Risa Ushijima	3–6, 4–6

=== Doubles (5–5) ===
Legend $25,000 tournaments $15,000 tournaments $10,000 tournaments	Finals by surface Hard (4–0) Clay (1–5)

Outcome	No.	Date	Tournament	Surface	Partner	Opponents	Score
Runner-up	1.	22 May 2005	Pitești, Romania	Clay	(Serbia) Andrea Popović	(Romania) Mădălina Gojnea (Romania) Monica Niculescu	4–6, 3–6
Runner-up	2.	26 March 2006	Mansourah, Egypt	Clay	(Romania) Laura Ioana Andrei	(Ukraine) Kateryna Avdiyenko (Belarus) Iryna Kuryanovich	2–6, 1–6
Runner-up	3.	2 April 2006	Cairo, Egypt	Clay	(Romania) Laura-Ioana Andrei	(Russia) Galina Fokina (Russia) Raissa Gourevitch	6–7^{(2)}, 7–5, 4–6
Runner-up	4.	23 March 2007	Rome, Italy	Clay	(Romania) Alexandra Dulgheru	(Italy) Giulia Gatto-Monticone (Belarus) Darya Kustova	7–5, 1–6, 2–6
Winner	1.	6 May 2007	Antalya, Turkey	Hard	(Bulgaria) Dessislava Mladenova	(Georgia (country)) Oksana Kalashnikova (Georgia (country)) Sofia Kvatsabaia	2–6, 6–2, 6–3
Winner	2.	1 July 2007	Bucharest, Romania	Clay	(Germany) Julia Görges	(Romania) Laura Ioana Andrei (Romania) Mădălina Gojnea	6–2, 6–4
Winner	3.	30 September 2007	Batumi, Georgia	Hard	(Romania) Mihaela Buzărnescu	(Russia) Vasilisa Davydova (Russia) Marina Shamayko	6–2, 6–4
Runner-up	5.	7 September 2008	Alphen aan den Rijn, Netherlands	Clay	(Croatia) Darija Jurak	(Argentina) Florencia Molinero (Ukraine) Lesia Tsurenko	6–4, 5–7, [7–10]
Winner	4.	9 August 2014	Sharm El Sheikh, Egypt	Hard	(Japan) Haine Ogata	(United Kingdom) Harriet Dart (New Zealand) Claudia Williams	6–4, 6–2
Winner	5.	27 March 2015	Bangkok, Thailand	Hard	(South Korea) Jang Su-jeong	(South Africa) Chanel Simmonds (United Kingdom) Emily Webley-Smith	6–4, 6–4

== Fed Cup participation ==
=== Singles ===
Edition	Stage	Date	Location	Against	Surface	Opponent	W/L	Score
2007	Europe/Africa Zone	18 April 2007	Plovdiv, Bulgaria	Estonia	Clay	(Estonia) Anett Schutting	W	6–1, 6–2
2007	Europe/Africa Zone	19 April 2007	Plovdiv, Bulgaria	Sweden	Clay	(Sweden) Johanna Larsson	L	6–2, 4–6, 5–7
2007	2007 Fed Cup	15 July 2007	Košice, Slovakia	Slovakia	Hard (i)	(Slovakia) Daniela Hantuchová	L	0–6, 2–6

=== Doubles ===
Edition	Round	Date	Location	Against	Surface	Partner	Opponents	W/L	Score
2007 Fed Cup	Europe/Africa Zone	18 April 2007	Plovdiv, Bulgaria	Estonia	Clay	(Serbia) Ana Timotić	(Estonia) Anett Schutting (Estonia) Margit Rüütel	W	6–2, 5–7, 6–3

== See also ==
- Serbia Fed Cup team
