= 2007 Fed Cup Europe/Africa Zone Group I – Pool A =

Group A of the 2007 Fed Cup Europe/Africa Zone Group I was one of four pools in the Europe/Africa Zone Group I of the 2007 Fed Cup. Four teams competed in a round robin competition, with the top team and the bottom team proceeding to their respective sections of the play-offs: the top team played for advancement to the World Group II Play-offs, while the bottom team faced potential relegation to Group II.

		(Switzerland) SUI	(Netherlands) NED	(Denmark) DEN	(Romania) ROU	RR; W–L	Set; W–L	Game; W–L	Standings
18	Switzerland		3–0	3–0	1–2	2–1	15–5	114–79	2
30	Netherlands	0–3		1–2	2–1	1–2	7–12	82–97	4
33	Denmark	0–3	2–1		1–2	1–2	6–13	73–98	3
42	Romania	2–1	1–2	2–1		2–1	11–9	101–96	1

== Switzerland vs. Denmark ==
Switzerland
3
TC Lokomotiv, Plovdiv, Bulgaria
18 April 2007
Red clay (outdoors)

Denmark
0

			1	2	3
1	(Switzerland) (Denmark)	Emmanuelle Gagliardi; Hanne Skak Jensen	6; 0	6; 0
2	(Switzerland) (Denmark)	Patty Schnyder; Caroline Wozniacki	7^{7} 6^{5}	6; 1
3	(Switzerland) (Denmark)	Timea Bacsinszky / Emmanuelle Gagliardi; Eva Dyrberg / Hanne Skak Jensen	7; 5	6; 1

== Netherlands vs. Romania ==
Netherlands
2
TC Lokomotiv, Plovdiv, Bulgaria
18 April 2007
Red clay (outdoors)

Romania
1

			1	2	3
1	(Netherlands) (Romania)	Elise Tamaëla; Mădălina Gojnea	3; 6	6; 2	6; 3
2	(Netherlands) (Romania)	Michaëlla Krajicek; Raluca Olaru	2; 6			retired
3	(Netherlands) (Romania)	Elise Tamaëla / Nicole Thijssen; Monica Niculescu / Raluca Olaru	7^{8} 6^{6}	6; 4

== Switzerland vs. Romania ==
Switzerland
1
TC Lokomotiv, Plovdiv, Bulgaria
19 April 2007
Red clay (outdoors)

Romania
2

			1	2	3
1	(Switzerland) (Romania)	Timea Bacsinszky; Mădălina Gojnea	4; 6	3; 6
2	(Switzerland) (Romania)	Patty Schnyder; Raluca Olaru	6; 4	2; 6	4; 6
3	(Switzerland) (Romania)	Emmanuelle Gagliardi / Patty Schnyder; Mădălina Gojnea / Monica Niculescu	6; 3	4; 6	9; 7

== Netherlands vs. Denmark ==
Netherlands
1
TC Lokomotiv, Plovdiv, Bulgaria
19 April 2007
Red clay (outdoors)

Denmark
2

			1	2	3
1	(Netherlands) (Denmark)	Nicole Thijssen; Hanne Skak Jensen	6; 0	6; 4
2	(Netherlands) (Denmark)	Elise Tamaëla; Caroline Wozniacki	2; 6	1; 6
3	(Netherlands) (Denmark)	Elise Tamaëla / Nicole Thijssen; Eva Dyrberg / Caroline Wozniacki	6; 4	3; 6	4; 6

== Switzerland vs. Netherlands ==
Switzerland
3
TC Lokomotiv, Plovdiv, Bulgaria
20 April 2007
Red clay (outdoors)

Netherlands
0

			1	2	3
1	(Switzerland) (Netherlands)	Emmanuelle Gagliardi; Elise Tamaëla	6; 3	6; 4
2	(Switzerland) (Netherlands)	Patty Schnyder; Michaëlla Krajicek	6; 2	6; 3
3	(Switzerland) (Netherlands)	Emmanuelle Gagliardi / Patty Schnyder; Nicole Thijssen / Pauline Wong	7; 5	7; 5

== Denmark vs. Romania ==
Denmark
1
TC Lokomotiv, Plovdiv, Bulgaria
20 April 2007
Red clay (outdoors)

Romania
2

			1	2	3
1	(Denmark) (Romania)	Eva Dyrberg; Mădălina Gojnea	3; 6	4; 6
2	(Denmark) (Romania)	Caroline Wozniacki; Raluca Olaru	6; 1	6; 4
3	(Denmark) (Romania)	Eva Dyrberg / Caroline Wozniacki; Mădălina Gojnea / Monica Niculescu	4; 6	5; 7

== See also ==
- Fed Cup structure
