= 2010 Fed Cup World Group II =

Part of tennis tournament

The World Group II was the second highest level of Fed Cup competition in 2010. Winning nations advanced to the World Group I play-offs, and losing nations were demoted to the World Group II play-offs.

== Australia vs. Spain ==
Australia
3
Memorial Drive Park, Adelaide, South Australia, Australia
6–7 February 2010
Hard (Outdoors)

Spain
2

			1	2	3
1	(Australia) (Spain)	Samantha Stosur; María José Martínez Sánchez	2; 6	6; 1	6; 4
2	(Australia) (Spain)	Casey Dellacqua; Anabel Medina Garrigues	2; 6	3; 6
3	(Australia) (Spain)	Samantha Stosur; Anabel Medina Garrigues	6; 1	6; 3
4	(Australia) (Spain)	Alicia Molik; Carla Suárez Navarro	1; 6	1; 6
5	(Australia) (Spain)	Rennae Stubbs / Samantha Stosur; Nuria Llagostera Vives / María José Martínez Sánchez	6; 4	6; 2

== Poland vs. Belgium ==
Poland
2
Łuczniczka, Bydgoszcz, Poland
6–7 February 2010
Taraflex (indoors)

Belgium
3

			1	2	3
1	(Poland) (Belgium)	Marta Domachowska; Yanina Wickmayer	6; 4	1; 6	3; 6
2	(Poland) (Belgium)	Agnieszka Radwańska; Kirsten Flipkens	6; 2	7^{7} 6^{5}
3	(Poland) (Belgium)	Agnieszka Radwańska; Yanina Wickmayer	6; 1	6^{6} 7^{8}	5; 7
4	(Poland) (Belgium)	Marta Domachowska; Kirsten Flipkens	3; 6	6^{6} 7^{8}
5	(Poland) (Belgium)	Klaudia Jans / Alicja Rosolska; An-Sophie Mestach / Sofie Oyen	6; 3	3; 6	6; 1

Broadcasting rights: (Poland) TVP Sport

Poland Cap. Tomasz Wiktorowski
WTA Rank (doubles Rank)	Player
9 (32)	Agnieszka Radwańska
135 (153)	Marta Domachowska
— (51)	Alicja Rosolska
— (52)	Klaudia Jans

Belgium Cap. Sabine Appelmans
WTA Rank (doubles Rank)	Player
15 (72)	Yanina Wickmayer
87 (327)	Kirsten Flipkens
827 (624)	Sofie Oyen
898 (630)	An-Sophie Mestach

== Estonia vs. Argentina ==
Estonia
4
Tere Sport Tennis Club, Tallinn, Estonia
6–7 February 2010
Plexipave (Indoors)

Argentina
1

			1	2	3
1	(Estonia) (Argentina)	Maret Ani; María Irigoyen	6; 1	6; 2
2	(Estonia) (Argentina)	Kaia Kanepi; Paula Ormaechea	6; 1	7; 5
3	(Estonia) (Argentina)	Kaia Kanepi; Aranza Salut	6; 1	6; 1
4	(Estonia) (Argentina)	Maret Ani; Paula Ormaechea	6; 2	6; 3
5	(Estonia) (Argentina)	Margit Rüütel / Anett Schutting; Mailen Auroux / Aranza Salut	5; 7	4; 6

== Slovakia vs. China ==
Slovakia
3
Sibamac Arena, Bratislava, Slovakia
6–7 February 2010
Latex-ite hard (indoors)

China
2

			1	2	3
1	(Slovakia) (China)	Dominika Cibulková; Han Xinyun	6; 1	6; 4
2	(Slovakia) (China)	Daniela Hantuchová; Zhang Shuai	6; 0	6; 1
3	(Slovakia) (China)	Dominika Cibulková; Zhang Shuai	6; 4	6; 1
4	(Slovakia) (China)	Kristína Kučová; Han Xinyun	1; 6	1; 6
5	(Slovakia) (China)	Dominika Cibulková / Kristína Kučová; Lu Jingjing / Zhang Shuai	3; 2			retired

== See also ==
- Fed Cup structure
