= 2008 Fed Cup Europe/Africa Zone Group II – Pool A =

Group A of the 2008 Fed Cup Europe/Africa Zone Group II was one of two pools in the Europe/Africa Zone Group II of the 2008 Fed Cup. Three teams competed in a round robin competition, with the top team and the bottom two teams proceeding to their respective sections of the play-offs: the top teams played for advancement to Group I, while the bottom team faced potential relegation to Group III.

		(South Africa) RSA	(Bosnia and Herzegovina) BIH	(Turkey) TUR	RR; W–L	Set; W–L	Game; W–L	Standings
49	South Africa		0–3	2–1	1–1	4–8	51–60	2
54	Bosnia and Herzegovina	3–0		3–0	2–0	12–0	73–38	1
57	Turkey	1–2	0–3		0–2	2–10	43–69	3

== Bosnia and Herzegovina vs. Turkey ==
Bosnia and Herzegovina
3
Coral Tennis Club, Tallinn, Estonia
30 January 2008
Greenset hard (indoors)

Turkey
0

			1	2	3
1	(Bosnia and Herzegovina) (Turkey)	Mervana Jugić-Salkić; Çağla Büyükakçay	6; 4	7; 5
2	(Bosnia and Herzegovina) (Turkey)	Sandra Martinović; Pemra Özgen	6; 2	6; 2
3	(Bosnia and Herzegovina) (Turkey)	Mervana Jugić-Salkić / Sandra Martinović; Çağla Büyükakçay / Pemra Özgen	6; 3	6; 3

== South Africa vs. Turkey ==
South Africa
2
Coral Tennis Club, Tallinn, Estonia
31 January 2008
Greenset hard (indoors)

Turkey
1

			1	2	3
1	(South Africa) (Turkey)	Tarryn Rudman; Çağla Büyükakçay	4; 6	3; 6
2	(South Africa) (Turkey)	Kelly Anderson; Pemra Özgen	6; 3	6; 3
3	(South Africa) (Turkey)	Kelly Anderson / Tarryn Rudman; Çağla Büyükakçay / Pemra Özgen	7^{7} 6^{2}	6; 0

== South Africa vs. Bosnia and Herzegovina ==
South Africa
0
Coral Tennis Club, Tallinn, Estonia
1 February 2008
Greenset hard (indoors)

Bosnia and Herzegovina
3

			1	2	3
1	(South Africa) (Bosnia and Herzegovina)	Tarryn Rudman; Mervana Jugić-Salkić	2; 6	1; 6
2	(South Africa) (Bosnia and Herzegovina)	Kelly Anderson; Sandra Martinović	4; 6	4; 6
3	(South Africa) (Bosnia and Herzegovina)	Andrea Oates / Elze Potgieter; Mervana Jugić-Salkić / Sandra Martinović	4; 6	4; 6

== See also ==
- Fed Cup structure
