= Emma Laine =

Finnish tennis player

- Full name: Emma Johanna Laine
- Country (sports): Finland
- Born: 26 March 1986 (age 39); Karlstad, Sweden
- Height: 1.64 m (5 ft 5 in)
- Retired: 2019
- Plays: Left-handed (two-handed backhand)
- Prize money: $506,301

Singles
- Career record: 293–206
- Career titles: 11 ITF
- Highest ranking: 50 (7 August 2006)

Grand Slam singles results
- Australian Open: 2R (2006)
- French Open: 2R (2006)
- Wimbledon: 1R (2006)
- US Open: 2R (2005, 2006)

Doubles
- Career record: 320–172
- Career titles: 44 ITF
- Highest ranking: 64 (30 October 2006)

Grand Slam doubles results
- Australian Open: 1R (2006, 2007)
- French Open: 2R (2006, 2007)
- Wimbledon: 3R (2006)
- US Open: 2R (2006)

Team competitions
- Fed Cup: 56–21

Emma Johanna Laine (born 26 March 1986) is a former tennis player from Finland.

Laine won 11 singles and 44 doubles titles on the ITF Women's Circuit. On 7 August 2006, she reached her best singles ranking of world No. 50. On 30 October 2006, she peaked at No. 64 in the doubles rankings.

Playing for Finland Fed Cup team, Laine has a win–loss record of 56–21.

== Biography ==
Emma's mother Erika was a swimmer, while her father Erkki Laine was an ice hockey player, winning a silver medal at the 1988 Winter Olympics. Emma was born in Sweden because Erkki was playing there at the time. He died in 2009.

Emma was introduced to tennis at age five by her parents. She is a baseliner who prefers hardcourts. She is coached by Olli Leppänen. She travels on tour with her coach or her sister (and best friend) Essi Laine, who also is a professional player.

== ITF finals ==
=== Singles (11–10) ===
Legend $100,000 tournaments $75,000 tournaments $50,000 tournaments $25,000 tournaments $10,000 tournaments	Finals by surface Hard (7–9) Clay (3–1) Grass (0–0) Carpet (1–0)

Outcome	No.	Date	Tournament	Surface	Opponent	Score
Winner	1.	26 January 2004	Tipton, United Kingdom	Hard (i)	(Romania) Liana Balaci	6–7^{(4)}, 6–2, 6–3
Winner	2.	22 February 2004	Capriolo, Italy	Carpet (i)	(Croatia) Nika Ožegović	7–6^{(6)}, 6–7^{(4)}, 7–6^{(4)}
Runner-up	1.	22 March 2004	St. Petersburg, Russia	Hard (i)	(Belarus) Anastasiya Yakimova	6–3, 2–6, 1–6
Winner	3.	5 April 2004	Torre del Greco, Italy	Clay	(South Africa) Chanelle Scheepers	3–6, 6–4, 6–0
Runner-up	2.	16 August 2004	Westende, Belgium	Hard	(Belgium) Leslie Butkiewicz	6–7^{(4)}, 6–7^{(4)}
Runner-up	3.	6 September 2004	Madrid, Spain	Hard	(Sweden) Hanna Nooni	4–6, 3–6
Winner	4.	20 September 2004	Jersey, United Kingdom	Hard (i)	(United Kingdom) Elena Baltacha	3–6, 6–2, 6–1
Runner-up	4.	14 February 2005	Bromma, Sweden	Hard (i)	(Ukraine) Olga Savchuk	1–6, 2–6
Runner-up	5.	21 March 2005	Saint Petersburg, Russia	Hard (i)	(Russia) Ekaterina Bychkova	1–6, 2–6
Winner	5.	15 August 2005	Helsinki, Finland	Hard	(Latvia) Irina Kuzmina	6–0, 6–2
Runner-up	6.	27 February 2006	Las Vegas, United States	Hard	(United States) Shenay Perry	1–6, 4–6
Winner	6.	12 January 2009	Glasgow, United Kingdom	Hard (i)	(France) Stéphanie Vongsouthi	4–6, 6–2, 7–6^{(4)}
Winner	7.	3 August 2009	Savitaipale, Finland	Clay	(Estonia) Anett Schutting	7–5, 6–1
Runner-up	7.	27 September 2010	Helsinki, Finland	Hard (i)	(Ukraine) Yuliya Beygelzimer	6–7^{(7)}, 0–6
Winner	8.	3 March 2014	Sharm El Sheikh, Egypt	Hard	(South Africa) Madrie Le Roux	6–2, 6–2
Winner	9.	3 August 2014	Savitaipale, Finland	Clay	(Greece) Maria Sakkari	6–3, 5–7, 6–0
Winner	10.	7 September 2014	Antalya, Turkey	Hard	(Thailand) Nungnadda Wannasuk	6–0, 6–4
Runner-up	8.	12 December 2015	Victoria Park, Hong Kong	Hard	(China) Tian Ran	2–6, 3–6
Winner	11.	26 December 2015	Victoria Park, Hong Kong	Hard	(Japan) Chihiro Muramatsu	6–1, 6–3
Runner-up	9.	10 July 2016	Lisbon, Portugal	Hard	(Spain) María José Luque Moreno	2–6, 3–6
Runner-up	10.	24 July 2016	Tampere, Finland	Clay	(Finland) Piia Suomalainen	6–0, 2–6, 3–6

=== Doubles (44–22) ===
Outcome	No.	Date	Tier	Tournament	Surface	Partner	Opponents	Score
Winner	1.	16 February 2004	10,000	Capriolo, Italy	Carpet (i)	(Finland) Essi Laine	(Netherlands) Jolanda Mens (Germany) Stefanie Weis	6–3, 6–3
Winner	2.	16 August 2004	10,000	Westende, Belgium	Hard	(Czech Republic) Veronika Chvojková	(Czech Republic) Janette Bejlková (Germany) Tatjana Malek	6–4, 7–5
Runner-up	1.	23 August 2004	10,000	Trecastagni, Italy	Hard	(Czech Republic) Veronika Chvojková	(Argentina) Andrea Benítez (Uruguay) Estefanía Craciún	3–6, 6–3, 2–6
Winner	3.	6 September 2004	25,000	Madrid, Spain	Hard	(Sweden) Hanna Nooni	(France) Kildine Chevalier (Spain) Marta Fraga	6–3, 7–6^{(3)}
Winner	4.	13 September 2004	10,000	Manchester, United Kingdom	Hard (i)	(Finland) Essi Laine	(United Kingdom) Hannah Collin (United Kingdom) Anna Hawkins	6–4, 6–4
Winner	5.	20 September 2004	25,000	Jersey, United Kingdom	Hard (i)	(Germany) Kathrin Wörle	(Netherlands) Anousjka van Exel (Turkey) İpek Şenoğlu	1–6, 6–1, 6–1
Winner	6.	7 February 2005	25,000	Capriolo, Italy	Hard (i)	(Ukraine) Mariya Koryttseva	(Poland) Klaudia Jans (Poland) Alicja Rosolska	3–6, 6–4, 7–5
Runner-up	2.	15 August 2005	25,000	Helsinki, Finland	Hard	(Finland) Essi Laine	(Bulgaria) Maria Geznenge (Austria) Stefanie Haidner	5–7, 6–2, 4–6
Runner-up	3.	27 November 2006	50,000	Milan, Italy	Carpet (i)	(Ukraine) Mariya Koryttseva	(Poland) Klaudia Jans (Poland) Alicja Rosolska	7–6^{(5)}, 5–7, 4–6
Winner	7.	7 May 2007	100,000	Rome, Italy	Clay	(Poland) Marta Domachowska	(Estonia) Maret Ani (Belgium) Caroline Maes	1–0 ret.
Winner	8.	14 May 2007	75,000	Zagreb, Croatia	Clay	(Hungary) Ágnes Szávay	(Poland) Klaudia Jans (Poland) Alicja Rosolska	6–1, 6–2
Winner	9.	24 September 2007	25,000	Nottingham, United Kingdom	Hard	(Belgium) Caroline Maes	(United Kingdom) Anna Fitzpatrick (Serbia) Ana Veselinović	3–6, 7–6^{(4)}, [10–6]
Runner-up	4.	12 May 2008	25,000	Szczecin, Poland	Clay	(Serbia) Teodora Mirčić	(Czech Republic) Iveta Gerlová (Czech Republic) Tereza Hladíková	1–6, 4–6
Winner	10.	19 May 2008	25,000	Moscow, Russia	Clay	(Serbia) Teodora Mirčić	(Russia) Maria Kondratieva (Ukraine) Oksana Teplyakova	7–6^{(5)}, 6–2
Runner-up	5.	23 June 2008	25,000	Kristinehamn, Sweden	Clay	(Belgium) Tamaryn Hendler	(Austria) Patricia Mayr (Slovakia) Lenka Tvarošková	3–6, 4–6
Winner	11.	14 July 2008	25,000	Darmstadt, Germany	Clay	(Canada) Heidi El Tabakh	(Netherlands) Michelle Gerards (Netherlands) Marcella Koek	6–3, 6–4
Winner	12.	18 August 2008	25,000	Westende, Belgium	Hard	(Belgium) Debbrich Feys	(Spain) Rebeca Bou Nogueiro (Russia) Julia Parasyuk	7–5, 7–5
Winner	13.	29 September 2008	25,000	Helsinki, Finland	Hard (i)	(Sweden) Johanna Larsson	(Austria) Patricia Mayr (Canada) Marie-Ève Pelletier	6–4, 6–2
Winner	14.	6 October 2008	50,000	Barnstaple, United Kingdom	Hard (i)	(South Africa) Kelly Anderson	(Argentina) Erica Krauth (Sweden) Hanna Nooni	6–2, 6–3
Winner	15.	24 November 2008	75,000+H	Toyota, Japan	Carpet (i)	(United Kingdom) Melanie South	(Japan) Kimiko Date-Krumm (China) Han Xinyun	6–1, 7–5
Winner	16.	9 February 2009	25,000	Stockholm, Sweden	Hard (i)	(France) Violette Huck	(Austria) Melanie Klaffner (Belarus) Ksenia Milevskaya	3–6, 7–6^{(5)}, [10–8]
Winner	17.	27 July 2009	10,000	Tampere, Finland	Clay	(Sweden) Sandra Roma	(France) Alizé Lim (Italy) Vivienne Vierin	6–4, 6–3
Winner	18.	28 September 2009	25,000	Helsinki, Finland	Hard (i)	(United Kingdom) Melanie South	(Sweden) Johanna Larsson (United Kingdom) Anna Smith	6–3, 6–3
Runner-up	6.	12 October 2009	50,000	Barnstaple, United Kingdom	Hard (i)	(South Africa) Kelly Anderson	(Sweden) Johanna Larsson (United Kingdom) Anna Smith	5–7, 4–6
Winner	19.	19 October 2009	25,000	Glasgow, United Kingdom	Hard (i)	(United Kingdom) Melanie South	(Italy) Evelyn Mayr (Italy) Julia Mayr	6–3, 6–2
Winner	20.	12 April 2010	25,000	Tessenderlo, Belgium	Clay (i)	(Poland) Magdalena Kiszczyńska	(Poland) Olga Brózda (Poland) Barbara Sobaszkiewicz	6–4, 6–1
Winner	21.	21 June 2010	25,000	Kristinehamn, Sweden	Clay	(Bosnia and Herzegovina) Mervana Jugić-Salkić	(Israel) Julia Glushko (Turkey) Pemra Özgen	6–2, 6–3
Winner	22.	28 June 2010	25,000	Ystad, Sweden	Clay	(Bosnia and Herzegovina) Mervana Jugić-Salkić	(Ukraine) Tetyana Arefyeva (Ukraine) Anastasiya Lytovchenko	6–1, 6–1
Winner	23.	12 July 2010	25,000	Woking, United Kingdom	Hard	(Hungary) Tímea Babos	(United Kingdom) Jocelyn Rae (Australia) Emelyn Starr	6–2, 6–2
Runner-up	7.	19 July 2010	25,000	Wrexham, United Kingdom	Hard	(India) Sania Mirza	(United Kingdom) Tara Moore (United Kingdom) Francesca Stephenson	6–2, 3–6, [11–13]
Winner	24.	9 August 2010	25,000	Tallinn, Estonia	Hard	(United Kingdom) Melanie South	(China) Lu Jingjing (China) Sun Shengnan	6–3, 6–4
Winner	25.	15 November 2010	25,000	Bratislava, Slovakia	Hard (i)	(France) Irena Pavlovic	(France) Claire Feuerstein (Russia) Valeria Savinykh	6–4, 6–4
Winner	26.	31 January 2011	25,000	Sutton, United Kingdom	Hard (i)	(United Kingdom) Melanie South	(Poland) Marta Domachowska (Croatia) Darija Jurak	6–3, 5–7, [10–8]
Runner-up	8.	14 March 2011	10,000	Bath, United Kingdom	Hard (i)	(United Kingdom) Tara Moore	(Italy) Giulia Gatto-Monticone (Italy) Anastasia Grymalska	4–6, 6–2, [6–10]
Winner	27.	20 June 2011	25,000	Kristinehamn, Sweden	Clay	(Bosnia and Herzegovina) Mervana Jugić-Salkić	(Hungary) Tímea Babos (Russia) Ksenia Lykina	6–4, 6–4
Runner-up	9.	27 June 2011	25,000	Ystad, Sweden	Clay	(Bosnia and Herzegovina) Mervana Jugić-Salkić	(Romania) Alexandra Cadanțu (Romania) Diana Enache	4–6, 6–2, [5–10]
Runner-up	10.	11 July 2011	25,000	Woking, United Kingdom	Hard	(United Kingdom) Melanie South	(France) Julie Coin (Czech Republic) Eva Hrdinová	1–6, 6–3, [8–10]
Winner	28.	17 October 2011	25,000	Glasgow, United Kingdom	Hard (i)	(France) Kristina Mladenovic	(Austria) Yvonne Meusburger (Liechtenstein) Stephanie Vogt	6–2, 6–4
Winner	29.	21 November 2011	25,000	Helsinki, Finland	Hard (i)	(Slovakia) Janette Husárová	(Hungary) Tímea Babos (Ukraine) Irina Buryachok	5–7, 7–5, [11–9]
Runner-up	11.	22 July 2013	10,000	Tampere, Finland	Clay	(Finland) Piia Suomalainen	(Germany) Julia Wachaczyk (Germany) Nina Zander	4–6, 4–6
Winner	30.	29 July 2013	10,000	Savitaipale, Finland	Clay	(Finland) Piia Suomalainen	(Russia) Anastasiya Komardina (Lithuania) Akvilė Paražinskaitė	6–4, 6–4
Runner-up	12.	26 August 2013	10,000	Antalya, Turkey	Hard	(United Kingdom) Melanie South	(Argentina) Andrea Benítez (Brazil) Carla Forte	6–4, 3–6, [8–10]
Winner	31.	2 September 2013	10,000	Antalya, Turkey	Hard	(United Kingdom) Melanie South	(Thailand) Patcharin Cheapchandej (Thailand) Tanaporn Thongsing	6–4, 6–3
Winner	32.	8 March 2014	10,000	Sharm El Sheikh, Egypt	Hard	(Japan) Akari Inoue	(Ukraine) Diana Bogoliy (Ukraine) Khristina Kazimova	6–2, 6–2
Runner-up	13.	22 March 2014	10,000	Sharm El Sheikh, Egypt	Hard	(United Kingdom) Emily Webley-Smith	(Russia) Eugeniya Pashkova (Montenegro) Ana Veselinović	3–6, 5–7
Winner	33.	23 May 2014	10,000	Bol, Croatia	Clay	(Russia) Eugeniya Pashkova	(Ukraine) Olga Ianchuk (Germany) Christina Shakovets	6–4, 6–0
Winner	34.	30 May 2014	10,000	Bol, Croatia	Clay	(Peru) Bianca Botto	(Czech Republic) Lenka Kunčíková (Czech Republic) Karolína Stuchlá	6–3, 6–3
Runner-up	14.	26 July 2014	10,000	Tampere, Finland	Clay	(Russia) Anastasia Pivovarova	(Australia) Alexandra Nancarrow (Greece) Maria Sakkari	2–6, 3–6
Winner	35.	2 August 2014	10,000	Savitaipale, Finland	Clay	(Ukraine) Diana Bogoliy	(Australia) Alexandra Nancarrow (Greece) Maria Sakkari	6–4, 7–6^{(2)}
Winner	36.	10 November 2014	10,000	Helsinki, Finland	Hard (i)	(Russia) Eugeniya Pashkova	(Finland) Mia Eklund (Finland) Olivia Pimiä	6–4, 6–0
Runner-up	15.	28 September 2015	15,000	Bangkok, Thailand	Hard	(Chinese Taipei) Hsu Ching-wen	(South Korea) Choi Ji-hee (Thailand) Peangtarn Plipuech	5–7, 3–6
Runner-up	16.	19 October 2015	15,000	Bangkok, Thailand	Hard	(Ukraine) Valeriya Strakhova	(Thailand) Nudnida Luangnam (Thailand) Peangtarn Plipuech	2–6, 3–6
Runner-up	17.	12 December 2015	10,000	Victoria Park, Hong Kong	Hard	(Japan) Yukina Saigo	(South Korea) Han Sung-hee (South Korea) Kim Na-ri	6–3, 3–6, [8–10]
Winner	37.	18 December 2015	10,000	Victoria Park, Hong Kong	Hard	(Japan) Yukina Saigo	(Japan) Mana Ayukawa (Japan) Haruka Kaji	w/o
Winner	38.	25 December 2015	10,000	Victoria Park, Hong Kong	Hard	(Japan) Yukina Saigo	(China) Jiang Xinyu (China) Li Yihong	6–1, 6–1
Runner-up	18.	8 January 2016	25,000	Victoria Park, Hong Kong	Hard	(Chinese Taipei) Hsu Ching-wen	(Switzerland) Viktorija Golubic (Liechtenstein) Stephanie Vogt	2–6, 6–1, [4–10]
Runner-up	19.	30 April 2016	10,000	Tučepi, Croatia	Clay	(Croatia) Adrijana Lekaj	(United States) Dasha Ivanova (Czech Republic) Petra Krejsová	3–6, 6–2, [5–10]
Winner	39.	27 May 2016	10,000	Warsaw, Poland	Clay	(United States) Sabrina Santamaria	(Sweden) Jacqueline Cabaj Awad (Italy) Deborah Chiesa	7–6^{(6)}, 6–0
Winner	40.	9 July 2016	10,000	Lisbon, Portugal	Hard	(United Kingdom) Samantha Murray	(France) Mathilde Armitano (Portugal) Inês Murta	7–6^{(5)}, 6–3
Winner	41.	23 July 2016	10,000	Tampere, Finland	Clay	(Germany) Julia Wachaczyk	(Finland) Mia Eklund (Germany) Katharina Hering	6–2, 6–3
Winner	42.	8 April 2017	15,000	Tučepi, Croatia	Clay	(United States) Sabrina Santamaria	(Slovakia) Jana Jablonovská (Slovakia) Sandra Jamrichová	6–3, 6–2
Winner	43.	22 April 2017	15,000	Antalya, Turkey	Clay	(Japan) Yuuki Tanaka	(Belgium) Marie Benoît (Belgium) Ysaline Bonaventure	3–6, 6–1, [10–4]
Runner-up	20.	23 June 2017	60,000	İzmir Cup, Turkey	Hard	(Japan) Kotomi Takahata	(Belgium) An-Sophie Mestach (Serbia) Nina Stojanović	4–6, 5–7
Runner-up	21.	16 March 2018	15,000	Heraklion, Greece	Clay	(United States) Sabrina Santamaria	(Hungary) Anna Bondár (Hungary) Réka Luca Jani	4–6, 5–7
Runner-up	22.	8 July 2018	25,000	Aschaffenburg, Germany	Clay	(United States) Chiara Scholl	(Russia) Polina Leykina (Bulgaria) Isabella Shinikova	6–7^{(4)}, 5–7
Winner	44.	21 September 2018	25,000	Lisbon, Portugal	Hard	(United Kingdom) Samantha Murray	(Netherlands) Michaëlla Krajicek (Czech Republic) Tereza Martincová	7–5, 6–4
