= Hanna Nooni =

Swedish tennis player

- Country (sports): Sweden
- Born: 9 March 1984 (age 41)
- Turned pro: 2001
- Retired: 2011
- Plays: Right (two-handed backhand)
- Prize money: $114,118

Singles
- Career record: 178–112
- Career titles: 5 ITF
- Highest ranking: No. 152 (18 July 2005)

Grand Slam singles results
- Australian Open: Q1 (2005)
- French Open: Q3 (2006)
- Wimbledon: Q1 (2005, 2006)
- US Open: Q1 (2004, 2005)

Doubles
- Career record: 82–75
- Career titles: 3 ITF
- Highest ranking: No. 146 (13 July 2009)

Hanna Nooni (born 9 March 1984) is a former Swedish tennis player.

In her career, she won five ITF singles (Madrid, Vittel, Portschach, Båstad and Garching) and three ITF doubles titles.

== Career ==
In 2006, Nooni had wrist surgery and returned to action in St Paul (February 2007). Her best surface is clay. She played doubles with Erica Krauth of Argentina, and the pair won two ITF titles (Charlottesville, Båstad). Hanna's career-high singles ranking is No. 152 (18 July 2005). On 13 July 2009, she peaked at No. 146 in the doubles rankings.

Nooni played for the Sweden Fed Cup team from 2003 to 2005, playing eight singles matches, of which she won two, and six doubles matches, of which she also won two.

== ITF Circuit finals ==
$100,000 tournaments
$75,000 tournaments
$50,000 tournaments
$25,000 tournaments
$10,000 tournaments

=== Singles: 8 (5–3) ===
Result	No.	Date	Tournament	Surface	Opponent	Score
Loss	1.	18 August 2003	Sezze, Italy	Clay	(Czech Republic) Petra Cetkovská	7–6^{(5)}, 3–6, 2–6
Loss	2.	16 September 2003	Sunderland, UK	Hard (i)	(Austria) Yvonne Meusburger	6–4, 3–6, 1–6
Win	1.	6 September 2004	Madrid, Spain	Hard	(Finland) Emma Laine	6–4, 6–3
Win	2.	3 July 2005	Båstad, Sweden	Clay	(Argentina) Erica Krauth	6–0, 6–2
Win	3.	17 July 2005	Vittel, France	Clay	(France) Mathilde Johansson	6–2, 6–2
Win	4.	28 August 2007	Pörtschach, Austria	Clay	(Austria) Janina Toljan	6–1, 4–6, 6–1
Loss	3.	24 September 2007	Nottingham, UK	Hard	(Czech Republic) Veronika Chvojková	2–6, 1–2 ret.
Win	5.	8 July 2008	Garching, Germany	Clay	(Slovakia) Michaela Pochabová	6–2, 7–5

=== Doubles: 13 (3–10) ===
Result	No.	Date	Tournament	Surface	Partner	Opponents	Score
Loss	1.	23 September 2002	Volos, Greece	Carpet	(Sweden) Klara Petersson	(Poland) Magdalena Marszałek (Serbia) Dina Milosevic	3–6, 3–6
Loss	2.	14 October 2003	Jersey, UK	Hard	(Austria) Yvonne Meusburger	(Sweden) Sofia Arvidsson (Estonia) Kaia Kanepi	3–6, 5–7
Loss	3.	10 May 2004	Stockholm, Sweden	Clay	(Sweden) Sofia Arvidsson	(Belarus) Nadejda Ostrovskaya (Serbia) Dragana Zarić	6–7^{(3)}, 3–6
Loss	4.	22 June 2004	Båstad, Sweden	Clay	(Australia) Mireille Dittmann	(Czech Republic) Zuzana Hejdová (Germany) Vanessa Henke	6–2, 2–6, 3–6
Win	1.	6 September 2004	Madrid, Spain	Hard	(Finland) Emma Laine	(France) Kildine Chevalier (Spain) Marta Fraga	6–3, 7–6^{(3)}
Loss	5.	27 June 2004	Båstad, Sweden	Clay	(Argentina) Erica Krauth	(Ukraine) Olena Antypina (Belarus) Nadejda Ostrovskaya	5–7, 6–3, 3–6
Win	2.	1 May 2007	Charlottesville, United States	Clay	(Argentina) Erica Krauth	(United States) Raquel Kops-Jones (United States) Lilia Osterloh	7–6^{(4)}, 6–4
Win	3.	5 July 2007	Båstad, Sweden	Clay	(Serbia) Teodora Mirčić	(Bosnia and Herzegovina) Mervana Jugić-Salkić (Greece) Anna Koumantou	7–5, 7–5
Loss	6.	14 July 2008	Contrexéville Open, France	Clay	(Argentina) Erica Krauth	(France) Stéphanie Foretz (France) Aurélie Védy	4–6, 4–6
Loss	7.	22 September 2008	Royal Cup, Montenegro	Clay	(Argentina) Erica Krauth	(Serbia) Neda Kozić (Bosnia and Herzegovina) Sandra Martinović	6–7^{(5)}, 2–6
Loss	8.	6 October 2008	GB Pro-Series Barnstaple, UK	Hard (i)	(Argentina) Erica Krauth	(South Africa) Kelly Anderson (Finland) Emma Laine	2–6, 3–6
Loss	9.	29 June 2009	Ystad, Sweden	Clay	(Austria) Melanie Klaffner	(Sweden) Sofia Arvidsson (Sweden) Sandra Roma	4–6, 4–6
Loss	10.	3 August 2009	Ladies Open Hechingen, Germany	Clay	(Argentina) Erica Krauth	(Austria) Yvonne Meusburger (Germany) Jasmin Wöhr	2–6, 6–7^{(1)}
