= Erica Krauth =

Argentine tennis player

- Country (sports): Argentina
- Residence: Luján, Argentina
- Born: 20 May 1981 (age 44) Luján, Argentina
- Turned pro: 1998
- Retired: 2010
- Plays: Right-handed (double-handed backhand)
- Prize money: $106,835

Singles
- Career record: 162–163
- Career titles: 0 WTA, 2 ITF
- Highest ranking: No. 229 (16 August 2004)

Doubles
- Career record: 224–140
- Career titles: 23 ITF
- Highest ranking: No. 103 (11 October 2004)

Grand Slam doubles results
- Wimbledon: 1R (2005)

Team competitions
- Fed Cup: 0–1

Erica Krauth (born 20 May 1981) is an Argentine retired tennis player. She has career-high WTA rankings of 229 in singles, achieved on 16 August 2004, and 103 in doubles, set on 11 October 2004. Krauth won two singles and 23 doubles titles on the ITF Women's Circuit.

She made her main-draw debut on the WTA Tour at the 2009 Swedish Open and 2009 Gastein Ladies in the doubles event partnering Hanna Nooni.

Krauth retired from professional tennis 2010.

== ITF finals ==
=== Singles (2–3) ===
Legend $100,000 tournaments $75,000 tournaments $50,000 tournaments $25,000 tournaments $10,000 tournaments	Finals by surface Hard (1–0) Clay (1–3) Grass (0–0) Carpet (0–0)

Result	No.	Date	Tournament	Surface	Opponent	Score
Win	1.	28 September 1998	Córdoba, Argentina	Clay	(Hungary) Katalin Marosi	2–6, 6–1, 6–4
Win	2.	17 May 1999	Elvas, Portugal	Hard	(Republic of Ireland) Kelly Liggan	6–1, 7–5
Loss	1.	19 June 2000	Alkmaar, Netherlands	Clay	(Argentina) Eugenia Chialvo	5–5 ret.
Loss	2.	6 October 2003	Ciudad Juárez, Mexico	Clay	(Argentina) Natalia Gussoni	4–6, 3–6
Loss	3.	3 July 2005	Båstad, Sweden	Clay	(Sweden) Hanna Nooni	0–6, 2–6

=== Doubles (23–19) ===
Legend $100,000 tournaments $75,000 tournaments $50,000 tournaments $25,000 tournaments $10,000 tournaments	Finals by surface Hard (2–1) Clay (21–18) Grass (0–0) Carpet (0–0)

Result	No.	Date	Tournament	Surface	Partner	Opponents	Score
Win	1.	7 June 1999	Galatina, İtaly	Clay	(Argentina) Mariana Díaz Oliva	(Italy) Giulia Casoni (Italy) Maria Paola Zavagli	6–1, 6–3
Loss	1.	14 June 1999	Gorizia, İtaly	Clay	(Germany) Marketa Kochta	(Spain) Gisela Riera (Spain) Mariam Ramon Climent	5–7, 3–6
Win	2.	20 September 1999	Lecce, İtaly	Clay	(Argentina) Vanesa Krauth	(Italy) Flavia Pennetta (Italy) Roberta Vinci	1–6, 7–6^{(7–5)}, 6–1
Win	3.	8 May 2000	Tortosa, Spain	Clay	(Argentina) Vanesa Krauth	(Germany) Barbara Rosenberger (Switzerland) Lucia Tallo	6–3, 7–5
Win	4.	15 May 2000	Barcelona, Spain	Clay	(Argentina) Vanesa Krauth	(Spain) Rocio Gonzalez (Spain) Rosa Maria Sitja	7–6^{(8–6)}, 6–3
Loss	2.	19 June 2000	Alkmaar, Netherlands	Clay	(Argentina) Vanesa Krauth	(South Africa) Mareze Joubert (Australia) Nicole Sewell	w/o
Win	5.	16 October 2000	Chieti, İtaly	Clay	(Argentina) Vanesa Krauth	(Romania) Oana Elena Golimbioschi (Romania) Andreea Ehritt-Vanc	4–5^{(5–7)}, 4–1, 4–2, 4–1
Win	6.	6 November 2000	Granada, Spain	Clay	(Argentina) Vanesa Krauth	(Serbia and Montenegro) Branka Bojovic (Spain) Conchita Martínez Granados	4–0, 4–2, 4–1
Win	7.	20 November 2000	Mallorca, Spain	Clay	(Argentina) Vanesa Krauth	(Serbia and Montenegro) Dragana Ilić (Slovakia) Alena Paulenková	4–0, 4–0
Loss	3.	27 November 2000	Mallorca, Spain	Clay	(Argentina) Vanesa Krauth	(Czech Republic) Gabriela Chmelinová (Czech Republic) Lenka Novotna	1–4, 2–4, 3–5
Loss	4.	2 April 2001	Ciudad Juárez, Mexico	Clay	(Argentina) Vanesa Krauth	(Spain) Alicia Ortuño (Venezuela) Milagros Sequera	4–6, 6–2, 2–6
Win	8.	16 April 2001	Coatzacoalcos, Mexico	Hard	(Argentina) Vanesa Krauth	(Argentina) Eugenia Chialvo (Spain) Conchita Martínez Granados	6–1, 6–4
Loss	5.	18 June 2001	Lenzerheide, Switzerland	Clay	(Argentina) Vanesa Krauth	(Germany) Kirstin Freye (Slovakia) Zuzana Váleková	6–3, 3–6, 2–6
Win	9.	19 August 2001	Paraná, Argentina	Clay	(Argentina) Jorgelina Cravero	(Argentina) Melisa Arévalo (Argentina) Natalia Gussoni	6–2, 6–3
Loss	6.	17 September 2001	Tbilisi, Georgia	Clay	(Argentina) Vanesa Krauth	(Australia) Anastasia Rodionova (Austria) Patricia Wartusch	2–6, 1–6
Loss	7.	8 October 2001	Hallandale Beach, United States	Clay	(Argentina) Vanesa Krauth	(Russia) Alina Jidkova (United States) Jessica Steck	6–4, 2–6, 3–6
Loss	8.	13 May 2002	Casale Monferrato, Italy	Clay	(Argentina) Melisa Arévalo	(Australia) Melissa Dowse (Australia) Rochelle Rosenfield	6–3, 6–7^{(5–7)}, 1–6
Loss	9.	21 May 2002	Turin, Italy	Clay	(Hungary) Katalin Marosi	(Serbia and Montenegro) Katarina Mišić (Serbia and Montenegro) Dragana Zarić	6–7^{(5–7)}, 3–6
Win	10.	9 June 2002	Caserta, Italy	Clay	(Brazil) Vanessa Menga	(Croatia) Maja Palaveršić (Canada) Marie-Ève Pelletier	6–4, 6–4
Loss	10.	29 September 2002	Raleigh, United States	Clay	(Argentina) Vanesa Krauth	(United States) Michelle Dasso (United States) Julie Ditty	6–7^{(4–7)}, 3–6
Win	11.	7 April 2003	Coatzacoalcos, Mexico	Hard	(Australia) Sarah Stone	(United Kingdom) Helen Crook (Greece) Christina Zachariadou	6–4, 4–6, 6–4
Loss	11.	23 August 2003	Paraná, Argentina	Clay	(Brazil) Carla Tiene	(Argentina) Jorgelina Cravero (Argentina) Vanina García Sokol	1–6, 3–6
Win	12.	1 December 2003	Palm Beach Gardens, United States	Clay	(Hungary) Melinda Czink	(Russia) Alina Jidkova (Russia) Tatiana Panova	6–1, 6–2
Win	13.	16 May 2004	Charlottesville, United States	Clay	(United States) Jessica Lehnhoff	(Puerto Rico) Vilmarie Castellvi (United States) Sunitha Rao	6–0, 6–1
Win	14.	14 June 2004	Lenzerheide, Switzerland	Clay	(France) Aurélie Védy	(Brazil) Joana Cortez (Brazil) Marina Tavares	6–2, 6–4
Win	15.	22 June 2004	Fontanafredda, Italy	Clay	(Hungary) Katalin Marosi	(Germany) Martina Müller (Czech Republic) Vladimíra Uhlířová	2–6, 6–3, 6–2
Win	16.	12 July 2004	Garching, Germany	Clay	(France) Aurélie Védy	(Germany) Angelika Bachmann (Slovakia) Stanislava Hrozenská	6–4, 7–6^{(7–5)}
Loss	12.	3 August 2004	Hechingen, Germany	Clay	(Germany) Jasmin Wöhr	(Slovakia) Eva Fislová (Slovakia) Stanislava Hrozenská	6–3, 3–6, 3–6
Loss	13.	13 September 2004	Bordeaux, France	Clay	(Germany) Jasmin Wöhr	(France) Stéphanie Cohen-Aloro (Tunisia) Selima Sfar	6–3, 3–6, 3–6
Win	17.	20 September 2004	Biella, Italy	Clay	(Germany) Martina Müller	(Bosnia and Herzegovina) Mervana Jugić-Salkić (Croatia) Darija Jurak	6–2, 6–3
Win	18.	4 October 2004	Girona, Spain	Clay	(Germany) Jasmin Wöhr	(Austria) Daniela Klemenschits (Austria) Sandra Klemenschits	2–6, 6–4, 6–3
Loss	14.	27 June 2004	Båstad, Sweden	Clay	(Sweden) Hanna Nooni	(Ukraine) Olena Antypina (Belarus) Nadejda Ostrovskaya	5–7, 6–3, 3–6
Win	19.	24 March 2006	Melbourne, Australia	Clay	(Australia) Monique Adamczak	(Chinese Taipei) Chan Yung-jan (Chinese Taipei) Chuang Chia-jung	7–6^{(7–4)}, 1–6, 6–1
Win	20.	3 July 2006	Båstad, Sweden	Clay	(France) Aurélie Védy	(Romania) Mihaela Buzărnescu (Romania) Magda Mihalache	2–6, 6–4, 6–4
Win	21.	29 July 2006	Pétange, Luxembourg	Clay	(Portugal) Frederica Piedade	(Lithuania) Lina Stančiūtė (Luxembourg) Claudine Schaul	6–3, 6–3
Win	22.	1 May 2007	Charlottesville, United States	Clay	(Sweden) Hanna Nooni	(United States) Raquel Kops-Jones (United States) Lilia Osterloh	7–6^{(7–4)}, 6–4
Loss	15.	14 July 2008	Contrexéville, France	Clay	(Sweden) Hanna Nooni	(France) Stéphanie Foretz (France) Aurélie Védy	4–6, 4–6
Loss	16.	22 September 2008	Podgorica, Montenegro	Clay	(Sweden) Hanna Nooni	(Serbia) Neda Kozić (Bosnia and Herzegovina) Sandra Martinović	6–7^{(5–7)}, 2–6
Loss	17.	6 October 2008	Barnstaple, Great Britain	Hard (i)	(Sweden) Hanna Nooni	(South Africa) Kelly Anderson (Finland) Emma Laine	2–6, 3–6
Win	23.	13 April 2009	Civitavecchia, Italy	Clay	(France) Aurélie Védy	(Belarus) Darya Kustova (Belarus) Tatiana Poutchek	6–1, 6–1
Loss	18.	27 April 2009	Cagnes-sur-Mer, France	Clay	(United States) Anna Tatishvili	(France) Julie Coin (Canada) Marie-Ève Pelletier	4–6, 3–6
Loss	19.	3 August 2009	Hechingen, Germany	Clay	(Sweden) Hanna Nooni	(Austria) Yvonne Meusburger (Germany) Jasmin Woehr	2–6, 6–7^{(1–7)}
