= Elise Tamaëla =

Dutch tennis player

- Country (sports): Netherlands
- Residence: Culemborg, Netherlands
- Born: 22 January 1984 (age 42) Tiel, Netherlands
- Height: 1.72 m (5 ft 8 in)
- Turned pro: 1999
- Retired: 2011
- Plays: Left-handed (two-handed backhand)
- Prize money: $190,236

Singles
- Career record: 244–156
- Career titles: 8 ITF
- Highest ranking: No. 129 (12 February 2007)

Grand Slam singles results
- Australian Open: Q3 (2005, 2007)
- French Open: Q3 (2005)
- Wimbledon: Q2 (2004)
- US Open: Q2 (2004)

Doubles
- Career record: 78–71
- Career titles: 9 ITF
- Highest ranking: No. 228 (9 April 2007)

Elise Tamaëla (born 22 January 1984) is a Dutch tennis coach and former professional tennis player.

On 12 February 2007, she achieved a career-high WTA singles ranking of 129. On 9 April 2007, she reached her highest doubles ranking of 228. She was coached by Stephan Ehritt.

In her career, Tamaëla won eight singles titles and nine doubles titles on the ITF Women's Circuit.

She was the coach of Kiki Bertens in the period 2019–2021. Tamaëla succeeded Paul Haarhuis as captain of the Netherlands Billie Jean King Cup team in November 2021.

== ITF Circuit finals ==
$100,000 tournaments
$75,000 tournaments
$50,000 tournaments
$25,000 tournaments
$10,000 tournaments

=== Singles: 15 (8 titles, 7 runner-ups) ===
Outcome	No.	Date	Tournament	Surface	Opponent	Score
Winner	1.	4 May 2003	ITF Bournemouth, UK	Clay	(Spain) Astrid Waernes García	6–1, 6–1
Winner	2.	11 May 2003	ITF Edinburgh, United Kingdom	Clay	(United Kingdom) Jane O'Donoghue	6–3, 6–3
Runner-up	3.	20 July 2003	ITF Garching, Germany	Clay	(Ukraine) Mariya Koryttseva	6–2, 4–6, 2–6
Runner-up	4.	10 August 2003	Ladies Open Hechingen, Germany	Clay	(Serbia) Ana Timotic	6–4, 4–6, 2–6
Winner	5.	30 November 2003	ITF Mount Gambier, Australia	Hard	(South Korea) Jeon Mi-ra	5–7, 7–6^{(4)}, 6–1
Winner	6.	12 February 2006	ITF Sunderland, UK	Hard (i)	(United Kingdom) Anne Keothavong	7–6^{(6)}, 6–3
Winner	7.	19 February 2006	ITF Stockholm, Sweden	Hard (i)	(France) Virginie Pichet	6–3, 3–6, 6–2
Winner	8.	18 March 2006	ITF Fuerteventura, Spain	Hard	(France) Aravane Rezaï	6–3, 3–6, 6–3
Winner	9.	4 February 2007	Sutton Ladies' Event, UK	Hard (i)	(Estonia) Maret Ani	6–2, 6–7^{(4)}, 7–6^{(3)}
Runner-up	10.	11 February 2007	ITF Tipton, United Kingdom	Hard (i)	(Estonia) Maret Ani	7–5, 6–7^{(3)}, 5–7
Winner	11.	30 October 2009	ITF Monastir, Tunisia	Hard	(Tunisia) Ons Jabeur	6–2, 6–2
Runner-up	12.	6 November 2009	ITF El Menzah, Tunisia	Hard	(Ukraine) Ganna Piven	1–6, 2–6
Runner-up	13.	9 May 2010	Wiesbaden Open, Germany	Clay	(Germany) Scarlett Werner	7–5, 2–6, 4–6
Runner-up	14.	4 July 2010	ITF Stuttgart, Germany	Clay	(Luxembourg) Mandy Minella	4–6, 2–6
Runner-up	15.	1 August 2010	ITF Bad Saulgau, Germany	Clay	(Slovakia) Lenka Juriková	4–6, 2–6

=== Doubles: 10 (9 titles, 1 runner-up) ===
Outcome	No.	Date	Tournament	Surface	Partner	Opponents	Score
Winner	1.	28 April 2003	ITF Bournemouth, UK	Clay	(Netherlands) Marielle Hoogland	(United Kingdom) Anna Hawkins (Republic of Ireland) Claire Curran	3–6, 6–2, 6–3
Winner	2.	12 February 2006	ITF Sunderland, UK	Hard (i)	(Netherlands) Kim Kilsdonk	(South Africa) Surina De Beer (Japan) Ayami Takase	7–5, 6–4
Winner	3.	10 February 2007	ITF Tipton, UK	Hard (i)	(Netherlands) Kim Kilsdonk	(Russia) Ksenia Lykina (Poland) Urszula Radwańska	6–3, 6–3
Winner	4.	20 July 2007	ITF Zwevegem, Belgium	Clay	(Netherlands) Kim Kilsdonk	(Poland) Magdalena Kiszczyńska (Poland) Karolina Kosińska	3–6, 6–4, 6–3
Runner-up	5.	28 October 2007	ITF Istanbul, Turkey	Hard (i)	(Netherlands) Kim Kilsdonk	(Bosnia and Herzegovina) Mervana Jugić-Salkić (Turkey) İpek Şenoğlu	1–6, 2–6
Winner	6.	3 October 2009	ITF Monastir, Tunisia	Hard	(Netherlands) Nicole Thyssen	(Tunisia) Ons Jabeur (Tunisia) Nour Abbès	6–1, 5–7, [10–4]
Winner	7.	6 November 2009	ITF El Menzah, Tunisia	Hard	(Netherlands) Nicole Thyssen	(Poland) Barbara Sobaszkiewicz (Poland) Sylwia Zagórska	6–4, 6–1
Winner	8.	20 December 2009	ITF Vinaros, Spain	Clay	(Netherlands) Lynn Schönhage	(Italy) Benedetta Davato (Spain) Nuria Párrizas Díaz	6–3, 6–4
Winner	9.	27 June 2010	ITF Périgueux, France	Clay	(Germany) Scarlett Werner	(Ukraine) Lyudmyla Kichenok (Ukraine) Nadiia Kichenok	6–2, 6–1
Winner	10.	1 August 2010	ITF Bad Saulgau, Germany	Clay	(Germany) Scarlett Werner	(Serbia) Ana Jovanović (Germany) Anna Zaja	6–1, 4–6, [10–7]

== Coaching career ==
From 2016 until 2018, Tamaëla was the coach of Aleksandra Krunić. After Bertens' break up with Raemon Sluiter, she became her head coach in November 2019. She had been a member of the team for about a year.
