= 2008 Fed Cup Europe/Africa Zone =

Subsection of tennis competition

The Europe/Africa Zone was one of three zones of regional competition in the 2008 Fed Cup.

== Group I ==
- Venue: SYMA Sportközpont, Budapest, Hungary (indoor carpet)
- Date: 30 January – 2 February

The fifteen teams were divided into three pools of four teams and one pool of three. The four pool winners took part in play-offs to determine the two nations advancing to the World Group II play-offs. The nations finishing last in their pools took part in play-offs, with the two losing nations relegated to Group II in 2009.

=== Pools ===
	Pool A	NED	BUL	LUX	POR
1	Netherlands (3–0)		2–0	2–1	3–0
2	Bulgaria (2–1)	0–2		2–1	3–0
3	Luxembourg (1–2)	1–2	1–2		2–0
4	Portugal (0–3)	0–3	0–3	0–2	

	Pool B	SUI	HUN	DEN	GBR
1	Switzerland (3–0)		2–1	3–0	2–1
2	Hungary (2–1)	1–2		3–0	2–1
3	Denmark (1–2)	0–3	0–3		2–1
4	Great Britain (0–3)	1–2	1–2	1–2	

	Pool C	SWE	BLR	SLO	GEO
1	Sweden (3–0)		2–1	3–0	3–0
2	Belarus (2–1)	1–2		3–0	3–0
3	Slovenia (1–2)	0–3	0–3		2–0
4	Georgia (0–3)	0–3	0–3	0–2	

	Pool D	SRB	ROM	POL
1	Serbia (2–0)		2–1	2–1
2	Romania (1–1)	1–2		3–0
3	Poland (0–2)	1–2	0–3	

=== Play-offs ===
Placing	A Team	Score	B/D Team
Promotion	Netherlands	0–2	Serbia
5th–8th	Bulgaria	0–2	Hungary
9th	Luxembourg	N/A	
9th		N/A	Denmark
Relegation	Portugal	0–2	Great Britain

Placing	C Team	Score	B/D Team
Promotion	Sweden	1–2	Switzerland
5th–8th	Belarus	0–2	Romania
9th	Slovenia	N/A	
Relegation	Georgia	0–3	Poland

- Serbia and Switzerland advanced to the 2008 World Group II play-offs.
- Portugal and Georgia were relegated to Group II for 2009.

== Group II ==
- Venue: Coral Tennis Club, Tallinn, Estonia (indoor hard)
- Date: 30 January – 2 February

The seven teams were divided into one pool of three teams and one of four teams. The winner of each pool played the runner-up of the other pool to determine which two nations would be promoted to Group I in 2009. The nations finishing third in their pools took part in play-offs with the losing nation relegated to Group II in 2009, along with the nation finishing fourth in the pool of four teams.

=== Pools ===
	Pool A	BIH	RSA	TUR
1	Bosnia and Herzegovina (2–0)		3–0	3–0
2	South Africa (1–1)	0–3		2–1
3	Turkey (0–2)	0–3	1–2	

	Pool B	EST	LTU	GRE	IRE
1	Estonia (3–0)		3–0	3–0	3–0
2	Lithuania (2–1)	0–3		2–0	2–1
3	Greece (1–2)	0–3	0–2		2–1
4	Ireland (0–3)	0–3	1–2	1–2	

=== Play-offs ===
Placing	A Team	Score	B Team
Promotion	Bosnia and Herzegovina	2–0	Lithuania
Promotion	South Africa	0–3	Estonia
Relegation	Turkey	2-1	Greece
Relegation		N/A	Ireland

- Bosnia and Herzegovina and Estonia advanced to Group I for 2009.
- Greece and Ireland were relegated to Group III for 2009.

== Group III ==
- Venue: Master Class Tennis and Fitness Club, Yerevan, Armenia (outdoor clay)
- Date: 22–26 April

The eleven teams were divided into one pool of five teams and one pool of six. The top team of each pool progressed to Group II for 2009.

=== Pools ===
	Pool A	LAT	NOR	MRI	ISL	ZIM
1	Latvia (4–0)		2–1	3–0	3–0	3–0
2	Norway (3–1)	1–2		2–1	3–0	3–0
3	Mauritius (2–2)	0–3	1–2		3–0	3–0
4	Iceland (1–3)	0–3	0–3	0–3		3–0
5	Zimbabwe (0–4)	0–3	0–3	0–3	0–3	

	Pool B	MAR	ARM	FIN	EGY	MNE	MDA
1	Morocco (5–0)		2–1	2–1	3–0	3–0	3–0
2	Armenia (4–1)	1–2		2–1	3–0	2–1	3–0
3	Finland (3–2)	1–2	1–2		2–1	2–1	2–1
4	Egypt (2–3)	0–3	0–3	1–2		2–1	2–1
5	Montenegro (1–4)	0–3	1–2	1–2	1–2		2–1
6	Moldova (0–5)	0–3	0–3	1–2	1–2	1–2	

- Latvia and Morocco advanced to Group II for 2009.

== See also ==
- Fed Cup structure
