= 2007 Fed Cup World Group II play-offs =

Part of tennis tournament

The 2007 World Group II play-offs were four ties which involved the losing nations of the World Group II and four nations from the three Zonal Group I competitions. Nations that won their play-off ties entered the 2008 World Group II, while losing nations joined their respective zonal groups.

== Australia vs. Ukraine ==
Australia
1
Royal Pines Resort, Ashmore, Australia
14–15 July 2007
Plexipave (outdoors)

Ukraine
4

			1	2	3
1	(Australia) (Ukraine)	Alicia Molik; Alona Bondarenko	3; 6	4; 6
2	(Australia) (Ukraine)	Nicole Pratt; Kateryna Bondarenko	0; 6	1; 6
3	(Australia) (Ukraine)	Nicole Pratt; Alona Bondarenko	5; 7	4; 6
4	(Australia) (Ukraine)	Casey Dellacqua; Yuliana Fedak	6; 4	6; 2
5	(Australia) (Ukraine)	Alicia Molik / Rennae Stubbs; Yuliya Beygelzimer / Kateryna Bondarenko	6; 2	3; 6	3; 6

== Argentina vs. Canada ==
Argentina
4
Córdoba Lawn Tenis Club, Córdoba, Argentina
14–15 July 2007
Red clay (outdoors)

Canada
1

			1	2	3
1	(Argentina) (Canada)	Gisela Dulko; Marie-Ève Pelletier	7; 5	6; 4
2	(Argentina) (Canada)	María Emilia Salerni; Aleksandra Wozniak	6; 3	6; 4
3	(Argentina) (Canada)	Gisela Dulko; Aleksandra Wozniak	6; 0	2; 6	2; 6
4	(Argentina) (Canada)	María Emilia Salerni; Stéphanie Dubois	6; 4	6; 1
5	(Argentina) (Canada)	Jorgelina Cravero / Betina Jozami; Stéphanie Dubois / Marie-Ève Pelletier				w/o

== Croatia vs. Chinese Taipei ==
Croatia
3
Tenis Klub "Split", Split, Croatia
14–15 July 2007
Red clay (outdoors)

Chinese Taipei
2

			1	2	3
1	(Croatia) (Chinese Taipei)	Nika Ožegović; Chan Yung-jan	6; 0	6; 3
2	(Croatia) (Chinese Taipei)	Jelena Kostanić Tošić; Hsieh Su-wei	6^{5} 7^{7}	4; 6
3	(Croatia) (Chinese Taipei)	Ana Vrljić; Chan Chin-wei	6; 0	6; 1
4	(Croatia) (Chinese Taipei)	Nika Ožegović; Hsieh Su-wei	6; 1	5; 7	6; 1
5	(Croatia) (Chinese Taipei)	Jelena Kostanić Tošić / Ana Vrljić; Chan Yung-jan / Chuang Chia-jung	6^{8} 7^{10}	3; 6

== Slovakia vs. Serbia ==
Slovakia
4
Steel Aréna, Košice, Slovakia
14–15 July 2007
Latex-ite hard (indoors)

Serbia
1

			1	2	3
1	(Slovakia) (Serbia)	Daniela Hantuchová; Ana Timotić	6; 1	6; 2
2	(Slovakia) (Serbia)	Dominika Cibulková; Jelena Janković	5; 7	6; 1	7; 9
3	(Slovakia) (Serbia)	Daniela Hantuchová; Vojislava Lukić	6; 0	6; 2
4	(Slovakia) (Serbia)	Dominika Cibulková; Ana Jovanović	6; 4	6; 2
5	(Slovakia) (Serbia)	Janette Husárová / Jana Jurićová; Ana Jovanović / Ana Timotić	6; 4	6; 2
