= Anna Koumantou =

Greek tennis player

- Native name: Άννα Κουμάντου
- Country (sports): Greece
- Born: 3 December 1982 (age 42)
- Turned pro: 1999
- Retired: 2008
- Plays: Right (two-handed backhand)
- Prize money: $18,979

Singles
- Career record: 49–60
- Career titles: 0
- Highest ranking: No. 573 (11 June 2007)

Doubles
- Career record: 52–53
- Career titles: 2 ITF
- Highest ranking: No. 263 (25 February 2008)

Team competitions
- Fed Cup: 3–18

Anna Koumantou (Greek: Άννα Κουμάντου; born 3 December 1982) is a retired Greek tennis player.

Koumantou won two doubles titles on the ITF Circuit in her career. On 11 June 2007, she reached her best singles ranking of world No. 573. On 25 February 2008, she peaked at No. 263 in the WTA doubles rankings.

Koumantou made her WTA Tour main-draw debut at the 2007 Istanbul Cup in the doubles event, partnering Sandra Klösel. Koumantou played her last match in 2008, and then retired from the sport.

== ITF Circuit finals ==
=== Singles (0–1) ===
Legend
$10,000 tournaments

Result	Date	Tier	Tournament	Surface	Opponent	Score
Loss	21 June 2004	10,000	ITF Orestiada, Greece	Hard	(France) Aurélie Védy	1–6, 1–6

=== Doubles (2–10) ===
Legend $50,000 tournaments $25,000 tournaments $10,000 tournaments	Finals by surface Hard (1–6) Clay (1–2) Carpet (0–2)

Result	Date	Tier	Tournament	Surface	Partner	Opponents	Score
Loss	25 October 1999	10,000	ITF Kastoria, Greece	Carpet (i)	(Greece) Asimina Kaplani	(Republic of Ireland) Karen Nugent (New Zealand) Shelley Stephens	2–6, 2–6
Loss	29 June 2003	10,000	ITF Orestiada, Greece	Hard	(Greece) Eleftheria Makromaridou	(Serbia and Montenegro) Daniela Berček (Turkey) İpek Şenoğlu	6–7^{(4)}, 2–6
Loss	3 April 2005	10,000	ITF Patras, Greece	Hard	(Greece) Asimina Kaplani	(Romania) Mădălina Gojnea (Romania) Lenore Lăzăroiu	3–6, 2–6
Loss	14 May 2005	10,000	ITF Bucharest, Romania	Clay	(Greece) Asimina Kaplani	(Romania) Bianca Bonifate (Romania) Mădălina Gojnea	2–6, 6–7^{(3)}
Win	12 June 2006	10,000	ITF Montemor-o-Novo, Portugal	Hard	(Turkey) Pemra Özgen	(Portugal) Neuza Silva (Norway) Karoline Steiro	w/o
Loss	24 September 2006	10,000	ITF Mytilini, Greece	Hard	(Turkey) İpek Şenoğlu	(Slovenia) Maja Kambič (Russia) Alexandra Panova	2–6, 1–6
Loss	6 October 2006	10,000	ITF Volos, Greece	Carpet	(Italy) Nicole Clerico	(Austria) Franziska Klotz (Austria) Patricia Mayr	6–4, 6–7^{(5)}, 3–6
Loss	19 March 2007	10,000	ITF Athens, Greece	Hard	(Turkey) Pemra Özgen	(Portugal) Neuza Silva (Netherlands) Nicole Thyssen	2–6, 4–6
Loss	26 March 2007	25,000	ITF Patras, Greece	Hard	(Bosnia and Herzegovina) Mervana Jugić-Salkić	(Poland) Olga Brózda (Slovakia) Lenka Tvarošková	3–6, 1–3 ret.
Loss	2 July 2007	25,000	ITF Båstad, Sweden	Clay	(Bosnia and Herzegovina) Mervana Jugić-Salkić	(Serbia) Teodora Mirčić (Sweden) Hanna Nooni	5–7, 5–7
Win	29 September 2007	10,000	ITF Thessaloniki, Greece	Clay	(Italy) Nicole Clerico	(Poland) Olga Brózda (Poland) Sylwia Zagórska	4–6, 6–4, [11–9]
Loss	6 October 2007	10,000	ITF Mytilini, Greece	Hard	(Italy) Nicole Clerico	(Poland) Olga Brózda (Poland) Magdalena Kiszczyńska	2–6, 6–7^{(3)}
