= Anna Gerasimou =

Greek tennis player (born 1987)

Anna Gerasimou Άννα Γερασίμου
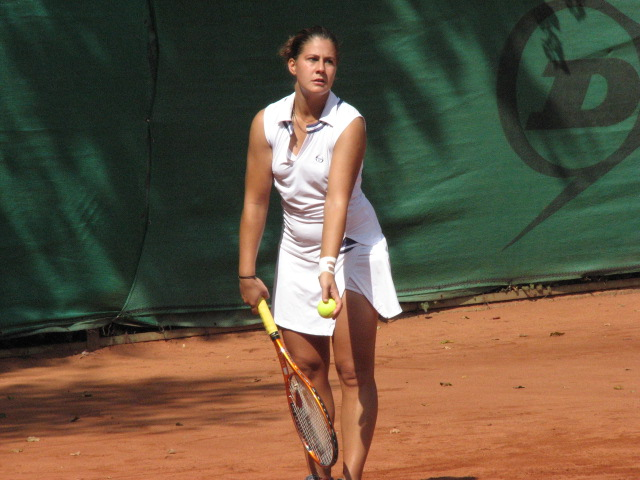
- At the Allianz Cup in Sofia, Sept. 2008
- Country (sports): Greece
- Born: 15 October 1987 (age 38) Kavala
- Turned pro: 2003
- Retired: 2010
- Plays: Right-handed (two-handed backhand)
- Prize money: $85,137

Singles
- Career record: 165–104
- Career titles: 7 ITF
- Highest ranking: No. 200 (9 March 2009)

Grand Slam singles results
- French Open: Q1 (2009)
- Wimbledon: Q1 (2009)

Doubles
- Career record: 41–47
- Career titles: 3 ITF
- Highest ranking: No. 201 (7 June 2010)

Anna Gerasimou (Greek: Άννα Γερασίμου; born 15 October 1987) is a retired Greek tennis player. When she was young, she moved from her birthplace Kavala to Athens in order to pursue a career in tennis.

Gerasimou competed in the women's doubles at the 2008 Summer Olympics with partner Eleni Daniilidou, and lost in the first round to the Swiss team of Emmanuelle Gagliardi and Patty Schnyder. Coached by George Kalovelonis, her highest career singles ranking was 200, which she achieved on 9 March 2009. She has qualified for a WTA Tour main draw twice, both in 2010, in Pattaya City, and in the Malaysia Open in Kuala Lumpur. She also had one WTA doubles main-draw appearance, in Pattaya City in 2010, where she reached the quarterfinals. She retired from tennis 2010.

== ITF Circuit finals ==
Legend
$25,000 tournaments
$10,000 tournaments

=== Singles: 15 (7 titles, 8 runner-ups) ===
Outcome	No.	Date	Tournament	Surface	Opponent	Score
Runner-up	1.	27 March 2005	ITF Athens, Greece	Clay	(Romania) Mădălina Gojnea	1–6, 3–6
Winner	2.	21 May 2006	ITF Antalya, Turkey	Hard	(Turkey) Çağla Büyükakçay	6–3, 6–2
Runner-up	3.	11 June 2006	ITF Haskovo, Bulgaria	Clay	(Bulgaria) Dia Evtimova	4–6, 7–6^{(7–5)}, 3–6
Winner	4.	24 September 2006	ITF Mytiline, Greece	Hard	(Russia) Alexandra Panova	6–4, 6–4
Winner	5.	8 October 2006	ITF Volos, Greece	Carpet	(Austria) Patricia Mayr	6–3, 2–6, 6–1
Runner-up	6.	24 February 2007	ITF Melilla, Spain	Hard	(Spain) Carla Suárez Navarro	4–6, 4–6
Winner	7.	10 March 2007	ITF Ramat HaSharon, İsrael	Hard	(Slovakia) Nikola Vajdová	6–2, 4–6, 6–4
Winner	8.	8 July 2007	ITF Mont-de-Marsan, France	Clay	(France) Olivia Sanchez	6–3, 2–6, 6–4
Runner-up	9.	22 September 2007	Telavi Open, Georgia	Clay	(Italy) Corinna Dentoni	2–6, 6–1, 0–6
Runner-up	10.	6 July 2008	ITF Mont-de-Marsan, France	Clay	(Belarus) Anastasiya Yakimova	3–6, 6–1, 4–6
Winner	11.	26 July 2008	ITF La Coruña, Spain	Hard	(Portugal) Neuza Silva	6–2, 6–7^{(5–7)}, 6–3
Runner-up	12.	2 November 2008	ITF İstanbul, Turkey	Hard	(Germany) Andrea Petkovic	6–2, 6–2
Winner	13.	5 July 2009	ITF Mont-de-Marsan, France	Clay	(Tunisia) Selima Sfar	7–5, 6–3
Runner-up	14.	18 October 2009	Lagos Open, Nigeria	Hard	(Slovakia) Zuzana Kučová	3–6, 5–7
Runner-up	15.	17 January 2010	ITF Pingguo, China	Hard	(China) Zhou Yimiao	3–6, 0–6

=== Doubles: 5 (3 titles, 2 runner-ups) ===
Outcome	No.	Date	Tournament	Surface	Partner	Opponents	Score
Runner-up	1.	23 February 2007	ITF Melilla, Spain	Hard	(Venezuela) Mariana Muci	(Spain) Melissa Cabrera-Handt (Spain) Carolina Gago-Fuentes	3–6, 4–6
Runner-up	2.	15 March 2008	ITF Las Palmas de Gran Canaria, Spain	Hard	(United Kingdom) Anna Hawkins	(Spain) Marta Marrero (Spain) María José Martínez Sánchez	2–6, 6–7
Winner	3.	16 October 2009	Lagos Open, Nigeria	Hard	(Russia) Nina Bratchikova	(Sweden) Anna Brazhnikova (Russia) Anastasia Mukhametova	7–6, 7–6
Winner	4.	23 October 2009	Lagos Open, Nigeria	Hard	(Russia) Nina Bratchikova	(Israel) Chen Astrogo (Israel) Keren Shlomo	6–4, 7–5
Winner	5.	28 March 2010	ITF Antalya	Clay	(Ukraine) Yuliya Beygelzimer	(Romania) Mihaela Buzărnescu (Australia) Alenka Hubacek	w/o
