= Kelly Anderson (tennis) =

South African tennis player (born 1985)

- Country (sports): South Africa
- Residence: Pietermaritzburg, South Africa
- Born: 20 April 1985 (age 40); Port Shepstone, South Africa
- Turned pro: 2004
- Retired: 2010
- Plays: Right (two-handed backhand)
- Prize money: US$ 28,860

Singles
- Career record: 19–36
- Career titles: 0
- Highest ranking: No. 625 (13 October 2008)

Doubles
- Career record: 64–60
- Career titles: 6 ITF
- Highest ranking: No. 135 (24 November 2008)

Kelly Anderson (born 20 April 1985, in Port Shepstone) is a former South African tennis player. Her career-high singles ranking is world No. 625, which she achieved in October 2008. Her highest doubles ranking is 135, reached in November 2008. Anderson played for the South Africa Fed Cup team numerous times. She also participated in WTA Tour doubles events regularly during the 2000s. Anderson retired from tennis 2010.

== ITF Circuit finals ==
=== Doubles: 11 (6–5) ===
Legend $100,000 tournaments $75,000 tournaments $50,000 tournaments $25,000 tournaments $10,000 tournaments	Finals by surface Hard (5–4) Clay (0–1) Grass (0–0) Carpet (1–0)

Result	No.	Date	Tournament	Surface	Partner	Opponents	Score
Loss	1.	27 June 2004	Edmond, United States	Hard	(South Africa) Carine Vermeulen	(Canada) Heidi El Tabakh (Republic of Ireland) Anne Mall	6–3, 3–6, 4–6
Win	1.	31 August 2007	Mollerusa, Spain	Hard	(South Africa) Lizaan du Plessis	(Spain) Sabina Mediano-Álvarez (Spain) Francisca Sintès Martín	6–4, 7–6 ^{(7–3)}
Loss	2.	10 September 2007	Alphen a/d Rijn, Netherlands	Clay	(United States) Kady Pooler	(Netherlands) Danielle Harmsen (Netherlands) Renée Reinhard	2–6, 4–6
Win	2.	23 September 2007	Nottingham, United Kingdom	Hard	(Netherlands) Leonie Mekel	(United Kingdom) Julia Bone (United Kingdom) Olivia Scarfi	6–3, 6–4
Win	3.	15 December 2007	Lagos, Nigeria	Hard	(South Africa) Chanelle Scheepers	(France) Iryna Brémond (Romania) Ágnes Szatmári	0–6, 6–3 [10–8]
Win	4.	22 December 2007	Lagos, Nigeria	Hard	(South Africa) Chanelle Scheepers	(France) Iryna Brémond (Romania) Ágnes Szatmári	1–6, 6–3 [10–6]
Win	5.	22 February 2008	Capriolo, Italy	Carpet (i)	(United Kingdom) Sarah Borwell	(Croatia) Darija Jurak (Croatia) Ivana Lisjak	7–6 ^{(9–7)}, 6–4
Loss	3.	21 March 2008	Noida, India	Hard	(South Africa) Chanelle Scheepers	(Serbia) Teodora Mirčić (Slovakia) Lenka Tvarošková	2–6, 7–6 ^{(9–7)} [6–10]
Win	6.	12 October 2008	Barnstaple, United Kingdom	Hard (i)	(Finland) Emma Laine	(Argentina) Erica Krauth (Sweden) Hanna Nooni	6–2, 6–3
Loss	4.	22 November 2008	Phoenix, Mauritius	Hard	(South Africa) Natalie Grandin	(Serbia) Teodora Mirčić (Slovakia) Lenka Tvarošková	4–6, 6–3 [4–10]
Loss	5.	11 October 2009	Barnstaple, United Kingdom	Hard (i)	(Finland) Emma Laine	(Sweden) Johanna Larsson (United Kingdom) Anna Smith	5–7, 4–6
