= Ana Timotić =

Serbian tennis player

Ana Timotić Aнa Tимoтић
- Country (sports): Yugoslavia (1998–2003); Serbia and Montenegro (2003–2006); Serbia (2006–present)
- Born: 30 December 1982 (age 42) Belgrade, SFR Yugoslavia
- Turned pro: 17 May 1998
- Retired: 2010
- Plays: Right (two-handed backhand)
- Prize money: $110,561

Singles
- Career record: 241–182
- Career titles: 9 ITF
- Highest ranking: No. 199 (19 June 2006)

Grand Slam singles results
- French Open: Q1 (2006)
- Wimbledon: Q1 (2006)
- US Open: Q2 (2004)

Doubles
- Career record: 58–84
- Career titles: 2 ITF
- Highest ranking: No. 274 (26 July 2004)

Team competitions
- Fed Cup: 9–10

Ana Timotić (Serbian: Aнa Tимoтић; born 30 December 1982) is a former professional Serbian tennis player.

During her career, Timotić won nine singles titles and two doubles titles on the ITF Circuit.

She also made 19 appearances for the Serbia Fed Cup team (previously Serbia and Montenegro), scoring 3–6 in singles and 6–4 in doubles.

== Personal life ==
Timotić was born and raised in Belgrade, and currently resides in Dubai, UAE with her husband Cesar Ferrer-Victoria where she runs a tennis academy called Ferrer Timotić Tennis Academy. She has named Danica Krstajić and Dragana Zarić as her best friends among professional players,.

== ITF finals ==
=== Singles: 21 (9–12) ===
Legend
$100,000 tournaments
$75,000 tournaments
$50,000 tournaments
$25,000 tournaments
$10,000 tournaments

| Result | No. | Date | Tournament | Surface | Opponent | Score |
|---|---|---|---|---|---|---|
| Win | 1. | 8 April 2001 | ITF Athens, Greece | Clay | (Belarus) Elena Yaryshka | 7–5, 6–3 |
| Win | 2. | 22 April 2001 | ITF Belgrade, Yugoslavia | Clay | (Hungary) Melinda Czink | 6–3, 5–7, 7–5 |
| Win | 3. | 1 July 2001 | ITF Båstad, Sweden | Clay | (Netherlands) Amanda Hopmans | 3–6, 6–3, 6–0 |
| Win | 4. | 22 September 2002 | ITF Barcelona, Spain | Clay | (Spain) María José Sánchez Alayeto | 6–3, 7–5 |
| Win | 5. | 20 October 2002 | ITF Makarska, Croatia | Clay | (Czech Republic) Lenka Novotná | 6–4, 3–6, 6–1 |
| Loss | 6. | 24 November 2002 | ITF Mallorca, Spain | Clay | (Spain) María José Sánchez Alayeto | 6–2, 3–6, 6–3 |
| Loss | 7. | 1 December 2002 | ITF Mallorca, Spain | Clay | (Spain) Rosa María Andrés Rodríguez | 7–5, 7–5 |
| Win | 8. | 22 June 2003 | ITF Canet-en-Roussillon, France | Clay | (France) Amadine Singla | 6–1, 6–2 |
| Loss | 9. | 27 July 2003 | ITF Horb, Germany | Clay | (Russia) Maria Kondratieva | 7–5, 6–3 |
| Win | 10. | 3 August 2003 | ITF Bad Saulgau, Germany | Clay | (Austria) Tina Schiechtl | 4–6, 6–2, 7–5 |
| Win | 11. | 10 August 2003 | Ladies Open Hechingen, Germany | Clay | (Netherlands) Elise Tamaëla | 4–6, 6–4, 6–2 |
| Loss | 12. | 28 September 2003 | ITF Jounieh, Lebanon | Clay | (Hungary) Kyra Nagy | 6–1, 7–5 |
| Loss | 13. | 15 February 2004 | ITF Mallorca, Spain | Clay | (Spain) Laura Pous Tió | 4–6, 6–3, 6–0 |
| Loss | 14. | 22 February 2004 | ITF Mallorca, Spain | Clay | (Serbia and Montenegro) Ana Ivanovic | 6–1, 6–1 |
| Win | 15. | 10 July 2005 | Bella Cup, Poland | Clay | (Poland) Joanna Sakowicz | 6–1, 6–2 |
| Loss | 16. | 25 September 2005 | ITF Tbilisi, Georgia | Clay | (Czech Republic) Sandra Záhlavová | 6–0, 6–3 |
| Loss | 17. | 2 October 2005 | Batumi Ladies Open, Georgia | Hard | (Belarus) Anastasiya Yakimova | 6–4, 6–1 |
| Loss | 18. | 22 October 2005 | ITF Seville, Spain | Clay | (Spain) Conchita Martínez Granados | 6–2, 6–2 |
| Loss | 19. | 21 October 2006 | ITF Seville, Spain | Clay | (Italy) Verdiana Verardi | 6–4, 6–4 |
| Loss | 20. | 29 July 2007 | ITF Horb, Germany | Clay | (Russia) Natalia Orlova | 1–6, 6–0, 6–3 |
| Loss | 21. | 5 October 2009 | Royal Cup, Montenegro | Clay | (Czech Republic) Renata Voráčová | 7–5, 2–1 ret. |

=== Doubles: 5 (2–3) ===
| Result | No. | Date | Tournament | Surface | Partner | Opponents | Score |
|---|---|---|---|---|---|---|---|
| Loss | 1. | 1 October 2000 | ITF Lerida, Spain | Clay | (Germany) Caroline-Ann Basu | (Spain) Patricia Aznar (Spain) Bárbara Navarro | 6–1, 6–3 |
| Loss | 2. | 22 April 2001 | ITF Belgrade, Yugoslavia | Clay | (Federal Republic of Yugoslavia) Dragana Ilić | (Austria) Daniela Klemenschits (Austria) Sandra Klemenschits | 6–2, 6–1 |
| Loss | 3. | 13 October 2002 | ITF Makarska, Croatia | Clay | (Slovakia) Zuzana Zemenová | (Czech Republic) Jana Macurová (Czech Republic) Lenka Novotná | 1–6, 6–3, 6–3 |
| Win | 4. | 1 December 2002 | ITF Mallorca, Spain | Clay | (Spain) Rosa María Andrés Rodríguez | (France) Iryna Brémond (Russia) Marianna Yuferova | 6–4, 6–3 |
| Win | 5. | 15 February 2004 | ITF Mallorca, Spain | Clay | (Spain) Rosa María Andrés Rodríguez | (Spain) Lourdes Domínguez Lino (Spain) Laura Pous Tió | 3–6, 6–4, 6–4 |
