= 2007 Fed Cup =

International women's tennis competition

Details
- Duration: 21 April – 16 September
- Edition: 45th

Achievements (singles)

The 2007 Fed Cup was the 45th edition of the most important competition between national teams in women's tennis.

The final took place at the Luzhniki Palace of Sports in Moscow, Russia, on 15–16 September. The home team, Russia, defeated the defending champions, Italy, 0–4, giving Russia their third title in four years.

== World Group ==
Participating teams
Belgium	China	France	Italy
Japan	Russia	Spain	United States

=== Draw ===
Quarterfinals; 21–22 April
Castellaneta Marina, Italy (Outdoor clay)
1	Italy	5
China	0
Limoges, France (Indoor clay)
Japan	0
4	France	5
Moscow, Russia (Indoor clay)
3	Russia	5
Spain	0
Delray Beach, FL, United States (Outdoor hard)
United States	5
2	Belgium	0

Semifinals; 14–15 July
Castellaneta Marina, Italy (Outdoor clay)
1	Italy	3
4	France	2
Stowe, VT, United States (Outdoor hard)
3	Russia	3
United States	2

Final; 15–16 September
Moscow, Russia (Indoor clay)
1	Italy	0
3	Russia	4

== World Group play-offs ==
The four losing teams in the World Group first round ties (Belgium, China, Japan and Spain), and four winners of the World Group II ties (Austria, Czech Republic, Germany and Israel) entered the draw for the World Group play-offs.

Date: 14–15 July

Venue	Surface	Home team	Score	Visiting team
Linz, Austria	Outdoor clay	Austria	1–4	Israel
Knokke-Heist, Belgium	Outdoor clay	Belgium	1–4	China
Toyota, Aichi, Japan	Indoor carpet	Japan	2–3	Germany
Palafrugell, Spain	Outdoor clay	Spain	4–1	Czech Republic

== World Group II ==
The World Group II was the second highest level of Fed Cup competition in 2007. Winners advanced to the World Group play-offs, and losers played in the World Group II play-offs.

Date: 21–22 April

Venue	Surface	Home team	Score	Visiting team
Bratislava, Slovakia	Outdoor clay	Slovakia	0–5	Czech Republic
Fürth, Germany	Outdoor clay	Germany	4–1	Croatia
Kamloops, BC, Canada	Indoor carpet	Canada	2–3	Israel
Dornbirn, Austria	Indoor clay	Austria	4–1	Australia

== World Group II play-offs ==
The four losing teams from World Group II (Australia, Canada, Croatia and Slovakia) played off against qualifiers from Zonal Group I. Two teams qualified from Europe/Africa Zone (Serbia and Ukraine), one team from the Asia/Oceania Zone (Chinese Taipei), and one team from the Americas Zone (Argentina).

Date: 14–15 July

Venue	Surface	Home team	Score	Visiting team
Ashmore, Australia	Outdoor hard	Australia	1–4	Ukraine
Córdoba, Argentina	Outdoor clay	Argentina	4–1	Canada
Split, Croatia	Outdoor clay	Croatia	3–2	Chinese Taipei
Košice, Slovakia	Indoor hard	Slovakia	4–1	Serbia

== Americas Zone ==
- Nations in **bold** advanced to the higher level of competition.
- Nations in italics were relegated down to a lower level of competition.

=== Group I ===
Venue: Pilara Tenis Club, Buenos Aires, Argentina (outdoor clay)

Dates: 18–21 April

Participating teams

- **Argentina**
- Brazil
- Chile
- Colombia
- Dominican Republic
- Mexico
- Puerto Rico

=== Group II ===
Venue: Carrasco Lawn Tennis Club, Montevideo, Uruguay (outdoor clay)

Dates: 16–21 April

Participating teams

- Barbados
- Bermuda
- Bolivia
- Ecuador
- Guatemala
- Honduras
- **Paraguay**
- Trinidad and Tobago
- **Uruguay**

== Asia/Oceania Zone ==
- Nations in **bold** advanced to the higher level of competition.
- Nations in italics were relegated down to a lower level of competition.

=== Group I ===
Venue: Scenic Circles Hotel Tennis Centre, Christchurch, New Zealand (outdoor hard)

Dates: 16–21 April

Participating teams

- **Chinese Taipei**
- Hong Kong
- India
- Jordan
- Kazakhstan
- New Zealand
- Singapore
- South Korea
- Thailand
- Uzbekistan

== Europe/Africa Zone ==
- Nations in **bold** advanced to the higher level of competition.
- Nations in italics were relegated down to a lower level of competition.

=== Group I ===
Venue: TC Lokomotiv, Plovdiv, Bulgaria (outdoor clay)

Dates: 18–21 April

Participating teams

- Belarus
- Bulgaria
- Denmark
- Estonia
- Great Britain
- Hungary
- Lithuania
- Luxembourg
- Netherlands
- Poland
- Romania
- **Serbia**
- Slovenia
- Sweden
- Switzerland
- **Ukraine**

=== Group II ===
Venue: National Tennis Centre, Vacoas-Phoenix, Mauritius (outdoor hard)

Dates: 17–20 April

Participating teams

- Bosnia and Herzegovina
- Finland
- **Georgia**
- Greece
- Norway
- **Portugal**
- South Africa

=== Group III ===
Venue: National Tennis Centre, Vacoas-Phoenix, Mauritius (outdoor hard)

Dates: 23–27 April

Participating teams

- Azerbaijan
- Egypt
- **Ireland**
- Latvia
- Liechtenstein
- Malta
- Mauritius
- Moldova
- Montenegro
- **Turkey**

== Rankings ==
The rankings were measured after the three points during the year that play took place, and were collated by combining points earned from the previous four years.

23 April
Rank	Nation	Points	Move
1	Russia	29,922.5	Steady
2	Italy	23,745.0	Steady
3	France	23,297.5	Steady
4	United States	12,490.0	▲1
5	Belgium	12,480.0	▼1
6	Spain	7,825.0	Steady
7	Austria	6,085.0	▲2
8	Japan	5,027.5	Steady
9	Germany	4,862.5	▲2
10	China	4,862.5	▼3

16 July
Rank	Nation	Points	Move
1	Russia	30,420.0	Steady
2	Italy	27,855.0	Steady
3	France	16,055.0	Steady
4	United States	9,907.5	Steady
5	Belgium	9,360.0	Steady
6	Spain	8,880.0	Steady
7	China	6,230.0	▲3
8	Israel	6,120.0	▲4
9	Germany	5,925.0	Steady
10	Austria	4,240.0	▼3

17 September
Rank	Nation	Points	Move
1	Russia	34,500.0	Steady
2	Italy	25,810.0	Steady
3	France	14,010.0	Steady
4	United States	9,907.5	Steady
5	Belgium	9,360.0	Steady
6	Spain	8,880.0	Steady
7	China	6,230.0	Steady
8	Israel	6,120.0	Steady
9	Germany	5,925.0	Steady
10	Austria	4,240.0	Steady
