= Greece Billie Jean King Cup team =

Greek women's tennis team

Greece
- Captain: Stavros Michalopoulos
- Nations Ranking: 46 ▼2 (12 November 2018)
- First year: 1968
- Years played: 40
- Ties played (W–L): 125 (51–74)
- Years in World Group: 16 (2–16)
- Best finish: World Group 2R (1977, 1984)
- Most total wins: Christína Papadáki (30–30)
- Most singles wins: Christína Papadáki (18–15)
- Most doubles wins: Eleni Daniilidou (15–4)
- Best doubles team: Christína Papadáki / Christina Zachariadou (8–7)
- Most ties played: Christína Papadáki (35)
- Most years played: Christína Papadáki (11)

The Greece Billie Jean King Cup team represents Greece in Billie Jean King Cup tennis competition and are governed by the Hellenic Tennis Federation. They currently compete in the Europe/Africa Zone Group I.

== History ==
Greece competed in its first Fed Cup in 1968. Their best result was reaching the round of 16 in 1977 and 1984.

Their current team is: Maria Sakkari, Valentini Grammatikopoulou, Eleni Kordolaimi, Despina Papamichail and Emmanouela Antonakis.

Past players include: Eleni Daniilidou, Anna Koumantou, Christína Papadáki, Christina Zachariadou, Olga Tsarbopoulou, Angelika Kanellopoulou and Carol-Ann Kalogeropoulos.

Denise Panagopoulou of Greece holds the record for the youngest player that ever competed in the Fed Cup. In 1977, she played at the age of 12 and 360 days.

== See also ==
- Billie Jean King Cup
- Greece Davis Cup team
- Greece at the Hopman Cup

== External source ==
- Team page at the Billie Jean King Cup (archived)
