= Margit Rüütel =

Estonian tennis player

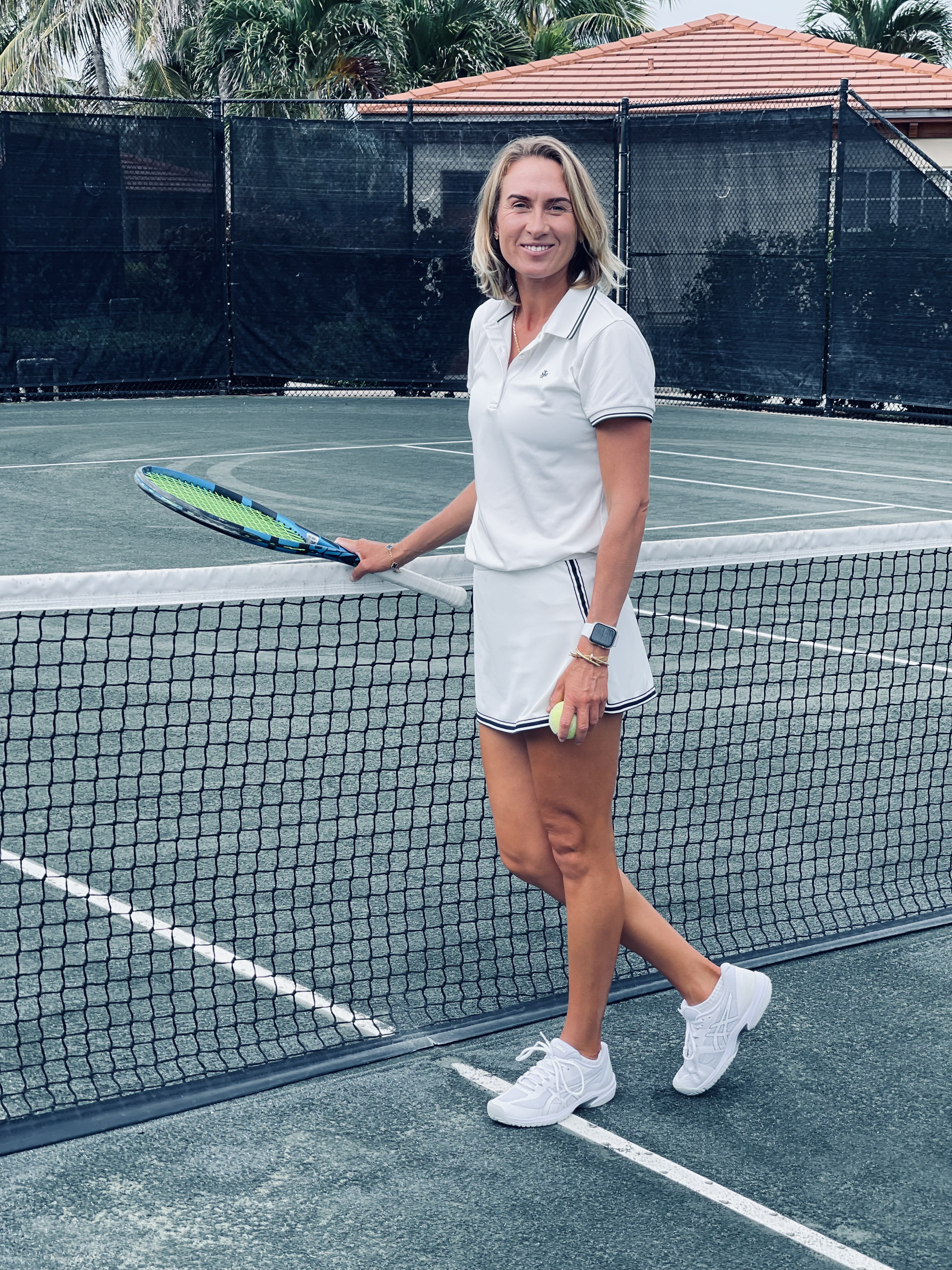
- Country (sports): Estonia
- Born: 4 September 1983 (age 42) Tallinn, then part of Estonian SSR, Soviet Union
- Turned pro: 2000
- Retired: 2015
- Plays: Right-handed (two-handed backhand)
- Prize money: US$155,171

Singles
- Career record: 246–175
- Career titles: 6 ITF
- Highest ranking: No. 158 (12 January 2009)

Grand Slam singles results
- Australian Open: Q3 (2008), Q1 (2009)
- French Open: Q2 (2006, 2007, 2008), Q1 (2010)
- Wimbledon: Q2 (2006, 2008)
- US Open: Q3 (2005, 2006, 2008)

Doubles
- Career record: 89–70
- Career titles: 7 ITF
- Highest ranking: No. 192 (9 April 2007)

Team competitions
- Fed Cup: 20–22

Margit Rüütel (born 4 September 1983) is a former tennis player from Estonia.

In her career, she won six singles titles and seven doubles titles on the ITF Circuit. On 12 January 2009, she reached her best singles ranking of world No. 158. On 9 April 2007, she peaked at No. 192 in the doubles rankings.

Rüütel made 42 appearances for the Estonia Fed Cup team between 1999 and 2012. Playing in Fed Cup competition, Rüütel has a win–loss record of 20–22.

In 2012, she played her last match on the ITF Circuit, and retired from circuit 2015.

== ITF Circuit finals ==
Legend
$50,000 tournaments
$25,000 tournaments
$10,000 tournaments

=== Singles: 12 (6 titles, 6 runner-ups) ===
Result	W–L	Date	Tournament	Surface	Opponent	Score
Loss	0–1	Jun 2000	ITF Tallinn, Estonia	Clay	(Estonia) Kaia Kanepi	1–6, 2–6
Loss	0–2	Jan 2001	ITF Båstad, Sweden	Hard (i)	(Germany) Martina Müller	2–6, 0–6
Win	1–2	Mar 2001	ITF Bari, Italy	Clay	(Slovakia) Eva Fislová	3–6, 6–3, 6–1
Loss	1–3	Nov 2003	ITF Stockholm, Sweden	Hard (i)	(France) Anne-Laure Heitz	6–3, 1–6, 4–6
Win	2–3	Oct 2004	GB Pro-Series Glasgow, UK	Hard (i)	(Austria) Sybille Bammer	3–6, 6–1, 7–5
Loss	2–4	Oct 2004	ITF Sunderland, UK	Hard (i)	(Netherlands) Tessy van de Ven	6–4, 0–6, 3–6
Win	3–4	Nov 2005	ITF Sunderland, UK	Hard (i)	(Finland) Piia Suomalainen	7–5, 6–0
Win	4–4	Dec 2005	ITF Valašské Meziříčí, Czech Republic	Hard (i)	(Czech Republic) Eva Hrdinová	6–0, 6–2
Win	5–4	Apr 2006	ITF Patras, Greece	Hard	(Bosnia and Herzegovina) Mervana Jugić-Salkić	6–3, 4–6, 6–2
Loss	5–5	Jul 2007	ITF Monteroni d'Arbia, Italy	Clay	(Russia) Alisa Kleybanova	1–6, 5–7
Win	6–5	Sep 2008	ITF Helsinki, Finland	Hard (i)	(Lithuania) Lina Stančiūtė	6–4, 6–7, 7–6
Loss	6–6	Jun 2010	ITF Szczecin, Poland	Clay	(Poland) Magda Linette	2–6, 0–6

=== Doubles: 12 (7 titles, 5 runner-ups) ===
Result	No.	Date	Tournament	Surface	Partner	Opponents	Score
Win	1.	13 August 2000	ITF Rimini, Italy	Hard	(Estonia) Maret Ani	(Hungary) Zsófia Gubacsi (Austria) Nicole Remis	3–6, 6–3, 7–5
Win	2.	8 July 2001	ITF Périgueux, France	Clay	(Latvia) Līga Dekmeijere	(France) Kildine Chevalier (Uruguay) Daniela Olivera	6–4, 6–1
Loss	3.	17 February 2002	ITF Kaunas, Lithuania	Hard (i)	(Estonia) Ilona Poljakova	(Russia) Daria Chemarda (Russia) Irina Kotkina	0–6, 3–6
Loss	4.	24 March 2002	ITF Rome, Italy	Clay	(Germany) Caroline-Ann Basu	(Italy) Claudia Ivone (Italy) Flavia Pennetta	3–6, 4–6
Win	5.	22 September 2005	GB Pro-Series Glasgow, UK	Hard (i)	(United Kingdom) Elena Baltacha	(United Kingdom) Anne Keothavong (United Kingdom) Karen Paterson	6–3, 6–7^{(2)}, 6–2
Loss	6.	10 December 2005	ITF Přerov, Czech Republic	Carpet (i)	(Germany) Gréta Arn	(Czech Republic) Lucie Hradecká (Czech Republic) Gabriela Chmelinová	6–3, 4–6, 4–6
Win	7.	3 April 2006	ITF Athens, Greece	Clay	(Poland) Olga Brózda	(Romania) Gabriela Niculescu (Romania) Monica Niculescu	2–6, 6–4, 6–2
Loss	8.	27 September 2006	ITF Nottingham, UK	Hard	(United Kingdom) Katie O'Brien	(United Kingdom) Karen Paterson (United Kingdom) Melanie South	2–6, 6–2, 6–7^{(1)}
Win	9.	12 October 2006	ITF Jersey, UK	Hard (i)	(United Kingdom) Katie O'Brien	(Czech Republic) Veronika Chvojková (United Kingdom) Claire Peterzan	7–5, 6–4
Loss	10.	19 October 2006	GB Pro-Series Glasgow, UK	Hard (i)	(United Kingdom) Katie O'Brien	(Czech Republic) Veronika Chvojková (Latvia) Līga Dekmeijere	4–6, 3–6
Win	11.	24 March 2007	ITF Tenerife, Spain	Hard	(Czech Republic) Andrea Hlaváčková	(Czech Republic) Veronika Chvojková (Czech Republic) Petra Cetkovská	2–3 ret.
Win	12.	8 September 2007	Save Cup, Italy	Clay	(Russia) Alisa Kleybanova	(Bosnia and Herzegovina) Mervana Jugić-Salkić (Belarus) Darya Kustova	6–2, 7–5
