= 2006 Fed Cup Europe/Africa Zone Group I – play-offs =

The play-offs of the 2006 Fed Cup Europe/Africa Zone Group I were the final stages of the Group I Zonal Competition involving teams from Europe and Africa. Those that qualified for this stage placed first and second in their respective pools, and also last in their pools.

Placing	Pool A	Pool B	Pool C	Pool D
1	Slovakia	Serbia and Montenegro	Great Britain	Israel
2	Netherlands	Denmark	Bulgaria	Romania
3	Luxembourg	Slovenia	Hungary	Belarus
4	Finland	South Africa	Ukraine	Estonia
5				Sweden

The eight top teams were then randomly paired up the team from a different placing of another group for a play-off tie, with the winners being promoted to the World Group II play-offs. The four bottom teams were also randomly paired up in play-off ties with the losers being relegated down to Group II for 2007.

== Promotion play-offs ==
=== Slovakia vs. Great Britain ===
Slovakia
2
TC Lokomotiv, Plovdiv, Bulgaria
22 April 2006
Red clay (outdoors)

Great Britain
1

			1	2	3
1	(Slovakia) (United Kingdom)	Magdaléna Rybáriková; Elena Baltacha	7; 5	6; 3
2	(Slovakia) (United Kingdom)	Daniela Hantuchová; Anne Keothavong	6; 2	6; 1
3	(Slovakia) (United Kingdom)	Dominika Cibulková / Janette Husárová; Elena Baltacha / Claire Curran	4; 6	3; 6

- Slovakia advanced to the World Group II play-offs, where they were drawn against Great Britain. They won 5–0, and thus advanced to the World Group II for next year.

=== Serbia and Montenegro vs. Israel ===
Serbia and Montenegro
1
TC Lokomotiv, Plovdiv, Bulgaria
22 April 2006
Red clay (outdoors)

Israel
2

			1	2	3
1	(Serbia and Montenegro) (Israel)	Ana Timotić; Anna Smashnova	5; 7	4; 5		retired
2	(Serbia and Montenegro) (Israel)	Ana Ivanovic; Shahar Pe'er	2; 6	6; 4	4; 6
3	(Serbia and Montenegro) (Israel)	Ana Ivanovic / Danica Krstajić; Tzipora Obziler / Shahar Pe'er	1; 6	6; 4	8; 10

- Israel advanced to the World Group II play-offs, where they were drawn against Indonesia. However, the Indonesians pulled out of the tie to protest the violence that occurred in the Gaza Strip at that time of the year. Israel thus progressed to the 2007 World Group II.

== Relegation play-offs ==
=== South Africa vs. Sweden ===
South Africa
0
TC Lokomotiv, Plovdiv, Bulgaria
22 April 2006
Red clay (outdoors)

Sweden
3

			1	2	3
1	(South Africa) (Sweden)	Elze Potgieter; Johanna Larsson	1; 6	0; 6
2	(South Africa) (Sweden)	Alicia Pillay; Sofia Arvidsson	1; 6	1; 6
3	(South Africa) (Sweden)	Alicia Pillay / Lizaan du Plessis; Mari Andersson / Nadja Roma	2; 6	0; 6

- South Africa was relegated down to Group II for next year, where they placed third overall.

=== Finland vs. Ukraine ===
Finland
0
TC Lokomotiv, Plovdiv, Bulgaria
22 April 2006
Red clay (outdoors)

Ukraine
2

			1	2	3
1	(Finland) (Ukraine)	Piia Suomalainen; Olena Antypina	7^{8} 6^{6}	1; 6	2; 6
2	(Finland) (Ukraine)	Emma Laine; Kateryna Bondarenko	3; 6	7^{11} 6^{9}	7; 9
3	(Finland) (Ukraine)					not played

- Finland was relegated down to Group II for next year, where they placed last in their pool of three, and lost in their relegation play-off. The Finns therefore played in the 2008 Group III.

== See also ==
- Fed Cup structure
