= Georgie Gent =

English tennis player (born 1988)

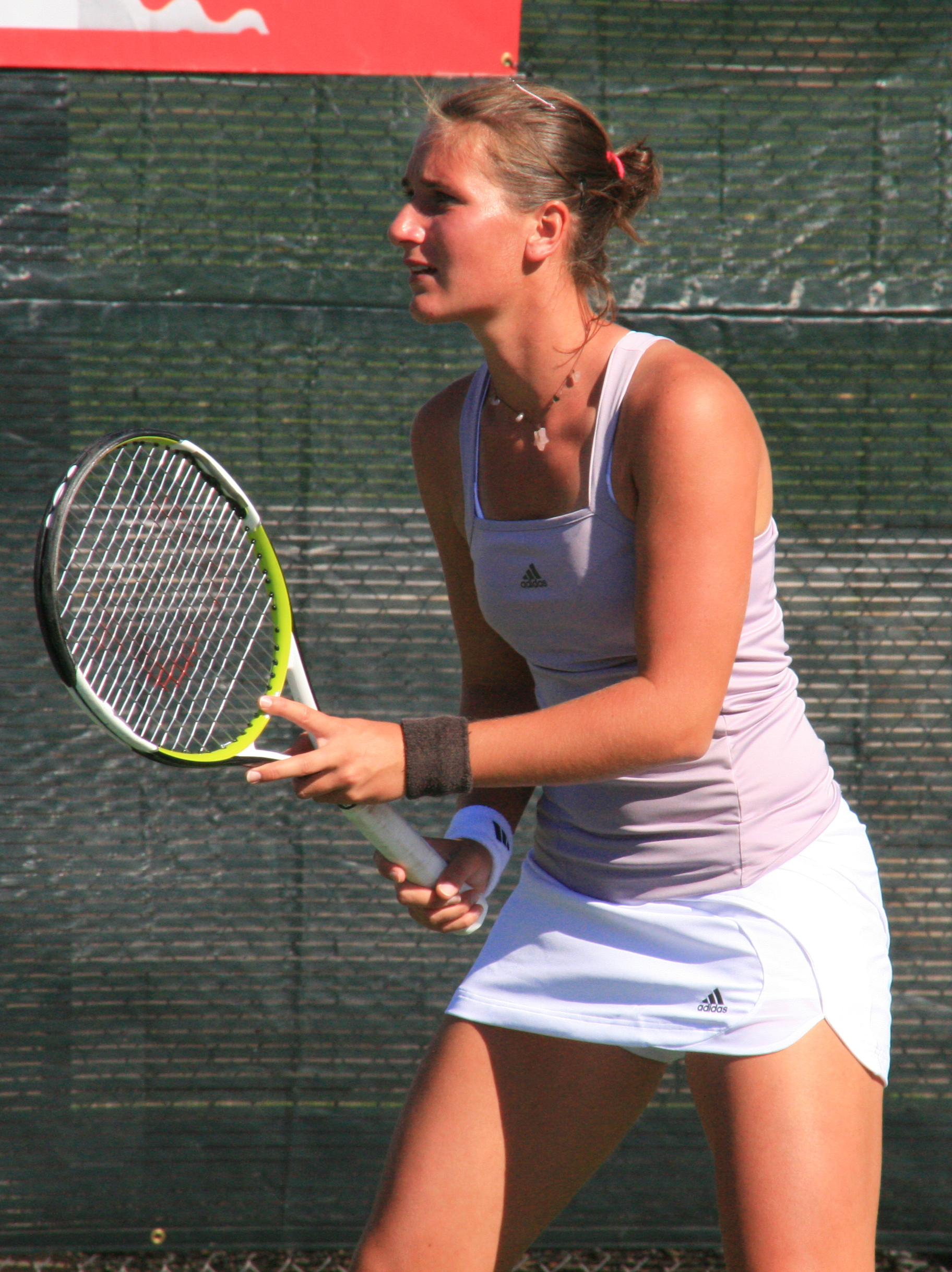
- Country (sports): United Kingdom
- Residence: Royston, Hertfordshire, England
- Born: 13 January 1988 (age 37) Cambridge, Cambridgeshire, England
- Height: 1.65 m (5 ft 5 in)
- Turned pro: 2006
- Retired: 2010
- Plays: Right-handed (two-handed backhand)
- Prize money: $111,311

Singles
- Career record: 128–98
- Career titles: 2 ITF
- Highest ranking: No. 178 (4 May 2009)

Grand Slam singles results
- Australian Open: Q2 (2009)
- French Open: Q1 (2009)
- Wimbledon: 1R (2009)
- US Open: Q1 (2009)

Doubles
- Career record: 54–64
- Career titles: 2 ITF
- Highest ranking: No. 205 (13 July 2009)

Grand Slam doubles results
- Wimbledon: 2R (2009)

Georgina Gent (formerly Stoop, born 13 January 1988) is an English tennis player. She won two singles and two doubles titles on the ITF Circuit, and reached a career-high singles ranking of world No. 178. The AEGON Award-winning former professional player was coached by Damien Roberts.

== Personal life ==
Stoop's parents are named Angus and Tessa and she has three older siblings, Sam, Olly and Milly, who she used to play tennis against. Her mother, Tessa, an interior designer spent time with her children playing tennis during their childhood. Stoop first began playing tennis at the age of 5 but enjoys all other sports as well, particularly hockey. After attending St Faith's School, she was selected to be educated at The Leys School while being coached by national coaches, and left school when she was sixteen. In 2008, Stoop's mother remarried and in 2010 Stoop changed her surname to her mother's new married name, to be known as Georgie Gent.

== Career ==
=== Junior (2003–2006) ===
Stoop's first match on the ITF Junior Circuit was in February 2003. In only the second junior tournament of her career (the Team Leschly Danish Junior Cup), she won two matches to qualify and then four more to reach the final; a marathon match which she eventually lost, 7–6^{(11)}, 6–7^{(3)}, 5–7. She reached one more final over the course of her junior career (in the Nottingham ITF tournament in August 2004) where she also lost. Her overall win–loss record in singles was 27–19.

She had less success in doubles, only reaching two quarterfinals (both with Laura Peterzan) over the course of her career and never passing this stage. Her doubles win–loss record was 6–16. She reached a career-high combined singles and doubles ranking of world No. 234 on 1 August 2005.

=== 2005–2007 ===
Stoop's first professional match win came in May 2005 at a $10k tournament where she reached the final before losing to Gaëlle Widmer from Switzerland in straight sets. She played seven more ITF tournaments that year but won only two more matches. She finished the year with a ranking of No. 903.

2006 started slowly for Stoop up until April when she reached the semifinals of the ITF tournament in Bath. She continued playing on the ITF Circuit, reaching two more quarter-finals, until June when she was awarded a wildcard into the Tier II International Women's Open qualifying event in Eastbourne, England. She was beaten without winning a single game by Akiko Morigami who was ranked 69 at the time, 553 places above Stoop. This wildcard was followed by another, this time into the qualifying tournament of her home Grand Slam tournament at Wimbledon where she was beaten by Stéphanie Cohen-Aloro, in straight sets. After this her ranking rose steadily as she played out the rest of the year on the ITF Circuit. She reached one more semi-final and three more finals, losing in two of them but winning the last as a qualifier in the $25k event in Nuriootpa, Australia. She ended the 2006 season ranked No. 412.

In her first tournament of 2007, Stoop reached the quarterfinal of the ITF event in Stuttgart, Germany. She reached the final of the $25k event in La Palma, Spain in March where she lost to María Emilia Salerni, 3–6, 3–6. She did not play again after this until October, after which she reached two more quarterfinals in $25k events held in Istanbul and Mount Gambier, losing to Monica Niculescu both times. Her year-end ranking for 2007 was world No. 306.

=== 2008 ===
Stoop reached two more ITF quarterfinals in the first half of 2008 before being given a wildcard into the Tier II International Open in Eastbourne where she came up against top-40 player Kaia Kanepi from Estonia in the first round. She put up a good fight, winning a first set tie break before losing the next two sets, 7–6^{(6)}, 1–6, 5–7. Her next wildcard was into the qualifying tournament of Wimbledon where she also lost in the first round. Her third consecutive wildcard was into the Tier II Bank of the West Classic qualifying tournament and it proved more fruitful than her previous two. She won two matches in three sets before falling to Michelle Larcher De Brito in the final round of qualifying, 4–6, 0–6. After this she reached three more ITF quarterfinals (one of them as a qualifier at the $75k event in Albuquerque, New Mexico) and two more ITF finals (in $25k Coimbra and $50k Troy) where she was beaten by Nicole Thyssen from the Netherlands and Anna Tatishvili from Georgia respectively. In October, Stoop reached the quarter-finals of the $50k tournament in Pittsburgh, USA where she lost to No. 6 seed Varvara Lepchenko. Her final world ranking of 2008 was No. 208.

=== 2009 ===
Stoop began her 2009 season by attempting to qualify for the Australian Open. She beat American Alexa Glatch in the first round before falling to Kathrin Wörle in a three-set battle, 3–6, 7–5, 12–14. In February and March she reached two ITF quarterfinals and one semifinal before heading to Paris to attempt to qualify for the French Open. She was beaten by Petra Martić in the first round of qualifying, 7–5, 7–5. In June she received three consecutive wildcards into WTA tournaments, the first of which was into the main draw of the Aegon Classic in Birmingham where compatriot Elena Baltacha defeated her in two sets in the first round. She then competed in the qualifying draw for the Aegon International but again did not win a match, losing to Ekaterina Makarova, 4–6, 6–7^{(2)}. Her third of three consecutive wildcards allowed Stoop entry into the main draw of Wimbledon for the first time in her career. She came up against No.7 seed Vera Zvonareva in the first round. Stoop almost caused a huge upset by coming close to defeating the Russian, however she eventually lost, 6–7^{(0)}, 6–4, 4–6. However, she did team up with Laura Robson in the doubles to face Jade Curtis and Anna Smith, a match which they won in an epic three sets, 6–4, 3–6, 13–11. Stoop and Robson went on to lose to Grand Slam champions Amélie Mauresmo and Svetlana Kuznetsova in the second round. After Wimbledon, Stoop reached one more ITF quarterfinal and won her second title, beating Katie O'Brien in an all-British final at the $25k event in Vigo, Spain.

== ITF Circuit finals ==
Legend
$50,000 tournaments
$25,000 tournaments
$10,000 tournaments

=== Singles: 8 (2–6) ===
Outcome	No.	Date	Tournament	Surface	Opponent	Score
Runner-up	1.	26 April 2005	ITF Bournemouth, Great Britain	Clay	(Switzerland) Gaëlle Widmer	3–6, 2–6
Runner-up	2.	18 July 2006	ITF Frinton, Great Britain	Grass	(France) Irena Pavlovic	2–6, 4–6
Runner-up	3.	19 September 2006	ITF Nottingham, Great Britain	Hard	(United Kingdom) Anna Smith	1–6, 4–6
Winner	4.	21 November 2006	ITF Nuriootpa, Australia	Hard	(United States) Raquel Kops-Jones	6–3, 4–6, 6–1
Runner-up	5.	26 March 2007	ITF La Palma, Spain	Hard	(Argentina) María Emilia Salerni	3–6, 3–6
Runner-up	6.	5 August 2008	ITF Coimbra, Portugal	Hard	(Netherlands) Nicole Thyssen	4–6, 4–6
Runner-up	7.	30 September 2008	ITF Troy, United States	Hard	(Georgia (country)) Anna Tatishvili	6–7^{(4–7)}, 4–6
Winner	8.	28 July 2009	ITF Vigo, Spain	Hard	(United Kingdom) Katie O'Brien	7–5, 6–2

=== Doubles: 6 (2–4) ===
Outcome	No.	Date	Tournament	Surface	Partner	Opponents	Score
Runner-up	1.	10 May 2006	ITF Edinburgh, Great Britain	Clay	(United Kingdom) Deborah Armstrong	(Sweden) Mari Andersson (Sweden) Nadja Roma	2–6, 2–6
Runner-up	2.	23 May 2006	ITF Budapest, Hungary	Clay	(United Kingdom) Naomi Cavaday	(Romania) Antonia Xenia Tout (Serbia) Nataša Zorić	1–6, 2–6
Winner	3.	18 July 2006	ITF Frinton, Great Britain	Grass	(United Kingdom) Jane O'Donoghue	(United Kingdom) Danielle Brown (Serbia) Ana Četnik	6–4, 4–6, 6–2
Winner	4.	20 September 2006	ITF Nottingham, Great Britain	Hard	(United Kingdom) Emily Webley-Smith	(United Kingdom) Naomi Cavaday (United Kingdom) Claire Peterzan	3–6, 7–5, 6–4
Runner-up	5.	11 October 2007	ITF Jersey, Great Britain	Hard (i)	(United Kingdom) Katie O'Brien	(Czech Republic) Andrea Hlaváčková (Czech Republic) Lucie Hradecká	0–6, 4–6
Runner-up	6.	28 July 2009	ITF Vigo, Spain	Hard	(United Kingdom) Jade Curtis	(Poland) Karolina Kosińska (France) Laura Thorpe	6–7^{(3–7)}, 2–6

== Grand Slam performance timeline ==
Key
W	F	SF	QF	#R	RR	Q#	DNQ	A	NH

(W) winner; (F) finalist; (SF) semifinalist; (QF) quarterfinalist; (#R) rounds 4, 3, 2, 1; (RR) round-robin stage; (Q#) qualification round; (DNQ) did not qualify; (A) absent; (NH) not held; (SR) strike rate (events won / competed); (W–L) win–loss record.

Tournament	2006	2007	2008	2009	2010	2011	2012	Career W–L
Grand Slam tournaments
Australian Open	A	A	A	LQ	A	A	A	0–0
French Open	A	A	A	LQ	A	A	A	0–0
Wimbledon	LQ	A	LQ	1R	A	A	A	0–1
US Open	A	A	A	LQ	A	A	A	0–0
Win–loss	0–0	0–0	0–0	0–1	0–0	0–0	0–0	0–1
