= 2006 Fed Cup Europe/Africa Zone Group I – Pool D =

International tennis competition

Group D of the 2006 Fed Cup Europe/Africa Zone Group I was one of four pools in the Europe/Africa Zone Group I of the 2006 Fed Cup. Four teams competed in a round robin competition, with the top team and the bottom team proceeding to their respective sections of the play-offs: the top team played for advancement to the World Group II Play-offs, while the bottom team faced potential relegation to Group II.

| | | (Belarus) BLR | (Israel) ISR | (Estonia) EST | (Sweden) SWE | (Romania) ROU | Match; W–L | Set; W–L | Game; W–L | Standings |
| 22 | Belarus | | 0–2 | 2–1 | 2–1 | 1–2 | 2–2 | 12–13 | 119–121 | 3 |
| 23 | Israel | 2–0 | | 2–1 | 3–0 | 2–1 | 4–0 | 18–8 | 136–103 | 1 |
| 32 | Estonia | 1–2 | 1–2 | | 3–0 | 1–2 | 1–3 | 16–12 | 130–123 | 4 |
| 39 | Sweden | 1–2 | 0–3 | 0–3 | | 2–1 | 1–3 | 7–20 | 105–151 | 5 |
| 46 | Romania | 2–1 | 1–2 | 2–1 | 1–2 | | 2–2 | 14–14 | 140–132 | 2 |

== Belarus vs. Estonia ==
Belarus
2
TC Lokomotiv, Plovdiv, Bulgaria
17 April 2006
Red clay (outdoors)

Estonia
1

| | | | 1 | 2 | 3 |
|---|---|---|---|---|---|
| 1 | (Belarus) (Estonia) | Ekaterina Dzehalevich; Kaia Kanepi | 1; 6 | 6^{6} 7^{8} |
| 2 | (Belarus) (Estonia) | Anastasiya Yakimova; Maret Ani | 4; 6 | 6; 2 | 6; 4 |
| 3 | (Belarus) (Estonia) | Tatiana Poutchek / Anastasiya Yakimova; Maret Ani / Kaia Kanepi | 6; 2 | 6; 3 |

== Israel vs. Sweden ==
Israel
2
TC Lokomotiv, Plovdiv, Bulgaria
17 April 2006
Red clay (outdoors)

Sweden
1

| | | | 1 | 2 | 3 |
|---|---|---|---|---|---|
| 1 | (Israel) (Sweden) | Anna Smashnova; Johanna Larsson | 6; 4 | 6; 4 |
| 2 | (Israel) (Sweden) | Shahar Pe'er; Sofia Arvidsson | 6; 4 | 6; 2 |
| 3 | (Israel) (Sweden) | Tzipora Obziler / Shahar Pe'er; Johanna Larsson / Nadja Roma | 2; 6 | 6; 3 | 8; 6 |

== Israel vs. Romania ==
Israel
2
TC Lokomotiv, Plovdiv, Bulgaria
18 April 2006
Red clay (outdoors)

Romania
1

| | | | 1 | 2 | 3 |
|---|---|---|---|---|---|
| 1 | (Israel) (Romania) | Anna Smashnova; Mădălina Gojnea | 1; 6 | 2; 6 |
| 2 | (Israel) (Romania) | Shahar Pe'er; Monica Niculescu | 6; 4 | 6; 4 |
| 3 | (Israel) (Romania) | Tzipora Obziler / Shahar Pe'er; Mădălina Gojnea / Monica Niculescu | 6; 3 | 4; 6 | 6; 4 |

== Estonia vs. Sweden ==
Estonia
3
TC Lokomotiv, Plovdiv, Bulgaria
18 April 2006
Red clay (outdoors)

Sweden
0

| | | | 1 | 2 | 3 |
|---|---|---|---|---|---|
| 1 | (Estonia) (Sweden) | Kaia Kanepi; Johanna Larsson | 6; 2 | 6; 0 |
| 2 | (Estonia) (Sweden) | Maret Ani; Sofia Arvidsson | 6; 2 | 6; 1 |
| 3 | (Estonia) (Sweden) | Maret Ani / Kaia Kanepi; Johanna Larsson / Nadja Roma | 6; 3 | 6; 4 |

== Belarus vs. Romania ==
Belarus
1
TC Lokomotiv, Plovdiv, Bulgaria
19 April 2006
Red clay (outdoors)

Romania
2

| | | | 1 | 2 | 3 |
|---|---|---|---|---|---|
| 1 | (Belarus) (Romania) | Ekaterina Dzehalevich; Mădălina Gojnea | 4; 6 | 2; 6 |
| 2 | (Belarus) (Romania) | Anastasiya Yakimova; Monica Niculescu | 4; 6 | 2; 6 |
| 3 | (Belarus) (Romania) | Ekaterina Dzehalevich / Anastasiya Yakimova; Mădălina Gojnea / Monica Niculescu | 6; 4 | 6; 3 |

== Israel vs. Estonia ==
Israel
2
TC Lokomotiv, Plovdiv, Bulgaria
19 April 2006
Red clay (outdoors)

Estonia
1

| | | | 1 | 2 | 3 |
|---|---|---|---|---|---|
| 1 | (Israel) (Estonia) | Anna Smashnova; Kaia Kanepi | 2; 6 | 4; 6 |
| 2 | (Israel) (Estonia) | Shahar Pe'er; Maret Ani | 6; 0 | 6; 1 |
| 3 | (Israel) (Estonia) | Tzipora Obziler / Shahar Pe'er; Maret Ani / Kaia Kanepi | 4; 6 | 6; 2 | 6; 1 |

== Belarus vs. Sweden ==
Belarus
2
TC Lokomotiv, Plovdiv, Bulgaria
20 April 2006
Red clay (outdoors)

Sweden
1

| | | | 1 | 2 | 3 |
|---|---|---|---|---|---|
| 1 | (Belarus) (Sweden) | Ekaterina Dzehalevich; Nadja Roma | 4; 6 | 7; 5 | 5; 7 |
| 2 | (Belarus) (Sweden) | Anastasiya Yakimova; Johanna Larsson | 6; 2 | 6; 2 |
| 3 | (Belarus) (Sweden) | Ekaterina Dzehalevich / Anastasiya Yakimova; Johanna Larsson / Sofia Arvidsson | 7; 5 | 6; 2 |

== Estonia vs. Romania ==
Estonia
1
TC Lokomotiv, Plovdiv, Bulgaria
20 April 2006
Red clay (outdoors)

Romania
2

| | | | 1 | 2 | 3 |
|---|---|---|---|---|---|
| 1 | (Estonia) (Romania) | Kaia Kanepi; Mădălina Gojnea | 3; 6 | 7^{7} 6^{3} | 4; 6 |
| 2 | (Estonia) (Romania) | Maret Ani; Monica Niculescu | 6; 2 | 4; 6 | 4; 6 |
| 3 | (Estonia) (Romania) | Kaia Kanepi / Margit Rüütel; Mădălina Gojnea / Monica Niculescu | 7; 5 | 7; 5 |

== Belarus vs. Israel ==
Belarus
0
TC Lokomotiv, Plovdiv, Bulgaria
21 April 2006
Red clay (outdoors)

Israel
2

| | | | 1 | 2 | 3 |
|---|---|---|---|---|---|---|
| 1 | (Belarus) (Israel) | Ekaterina Dzehalevich; Tzipora Obziler | 7^{7} 6^{1} | 5; 7 | 4; 6 |
| 2 | (Belarus) (Israel) | Anastasiya Yakimova; Shahar Pe'er | 2; 6 | 1; 6 |
| 3 | (Belarus) (Israel) | | | | | not played |

== Sweden vs. Romania ==
Sweden
2
TC Lokomotiv, Plovdiv, Bulgaria
21 April 2006
Red clay (outdoors)

Romania
1

| | | | 1 | 2 | 3 |
|---|---|---|---|---|---|
| 1 | (Sweden) (Romania) | Nadja Roma; Mădălina Gojnea | 3; 6 | 3; 6 |
| 2 | (Sweden) (Romania) | Johanna Larsson; Monica Niculescu | 3; 6 | 7^{7} 6^{3} | 6; 1 |
| 3 | (Sweden) (Romania) | Mari Andersson / Nadja Roma; Mihaela Buzărnescu / Sorana Cîrstea | 7; 5 | 6; 4 |

== See also ==
- Fed Cup structure
