= Karen Paterson =

British tennis player (born 1982)

- Country (sports): United Kingdom; Scotland
- Residence: Edinburgh, Scotland
- Born: 18 May 1982 (age 43); Edinburgh
- Turned pro: 1998
- Retired: 2007
- Plays: Right-handed
- Prize money: $64,545

Singles
- Career record: 135–153
- Career titles: 2 ITF
- Highest ranking: No. 369 (3 October 2005)

Grand Slam singles results
- Wimbledon: Q1 (2005, 2006, 2007)

Doubles
- Career record: 58–84
- Career titles: 5 ITF
- Highest ranking: No. 220 (6 August 2007)

Grand Slam doubles results
- Wimbledon: 1R (2006, 2007)
Medal record
Representing Scotland
Commonwealth Youth Games
Silver medal – second place	2000 Edinburgh	Women's team

Karen Paterson (born 18 May 1982) is a Scottish retired tennis player. She is now known as Karen Lamb.

Between the years 1998 and 2007 she won a total of seven titles on the ITF Women's Circuit, reaching a career-high ranking of world No. 369 in singles (achieved on 3 October 2005) and No. 220 as a doubles player (achieved on 6 August 2007). She coached British junior, Steph Cornish and currently coaches another British player, Jocelyn Rae.

As a singles competitor, she never managed to qualify for any of the four Grand Slam tournaments although she did compete in the Wimbledon doubles competition on two occasions in 2006 and 2007. In 2006, she and Rebecca Llewellyn were beaten by the No. 2 seeds, Cara Black and Rennae Stubbs, and in 2007 she and Melanie South lost to Janette Husárová and Meghann Shaughnessy, the No. 7 seeds.

== Career ==
=== 1998–2000 ===
Paterson's first professional tournament came in September 1998 when she attempted to qualify for a $25k tournament in Edinburgh, Scotland where she reached the second round of qualifying. Over the rest of the year she attempted to qualify for three more ITF events in Great Britain but was unsuccessful each time. She finished 1998 without a world ranking.

She also spent 1999 attempting to qualify for lower-level ITF tournaments with limited success; falling in qualifying four times and the first round of main draws four times (once as a lucky loser). She again finished the year without a world ranking.

The 2000 season was spent falling in qualifying a total of eight times and once in the second round of a $10k tournament in Glasgow. She finished the season with a ranking of world No. 1178.

=== 2001–2002 ===
Up until March of 2001, Paterson failed to progress past the qualifying stages of tournaments when she reached the semi-finals of a $10k tournament in Chandigarh, India beating a young Sania Mirza along the way. Paterson spent the rest of the year competing on the ITF circuit and, as a result, her year-end ranking had risen to No. 644.

Paterson did not manage to progress past the second round of any ITF tournament during 2002 and as a result her year-end ranking fell to world No. 708.

=== 2003 ===
In January, Paterson reached the semifinals of a $10k tournament in Tipton as a lucky loser and in May she was a quarterfinalist in another $10k event, this one in Edinburgh. She teamed up with Emily Webley-Smith in June and they were given a wild card into the qualifying draw for the Wimbledon doubles tournament. They were beaten 6–2, 6–3 by Jill Craybas and Vanessa Webb. Paterson reached the semifinals in Felixstowe and the quarterfinals in Pontevedra (both $10k) in July and the next month she reached the first ITF final of her career in Wrexham. She was beaten by Timea Bacsinszky in straight sets, 6–0, 6–3. October saw her reach the quarterfinals of a $25k event in Jersey where she lost to Sybille Bammer. Akgul Amanmuradova defeated Paterson, 6–2, 7–5, in the semifinals of a $10k event in Pune in November. Her year-end ranking was world No. 416.

=== 2004 ===
A promising start to 2004 saw Paterson reach the quarterfinals of a $10k in Kingston upon Hull, however, she only managed to win two of her next eleven matches, and these two wins both came in the qualifying stages of tournaments. Nevertheless, she received a wild card into the qualifying draw for the DFS Classic in June where she lost to Roberta Vinci in round one of qualifying. Following this she reached the semifinals of Felixstowe $10k and two weeks later, the quarterfinals of Pontevedra ($25k). She spent the rest of the year competing on the ITF circuit and reached two more semi-finals: the first in a $10k in Manchester and the second in Glasgow, a $25k event where she again lost to Sybille Bammer. Paterson finished the year ranked world No. 448.

=== 2005 ===
Paterson again started the year well, reaching the final in her first tournament of 2005 in Grenoble ($10k). Mervana Jugić-Salkić beat her 6–3, 6–1 in the final. Paterson again experienced a slight lull up until June when she was given a wild card into the qualifying draw for the DFS Classic for the second year running. She was defeated by Milagros Sequera in the first round of qualifying before being given a wild card into the qualifying draw for Wimbledon where she was again defeated in the first stage of the qualifying event, this time by Adriana Serra Zanetti. In August she reached two ITF quarterfinals in Hampstead and Amarante, Portugal, both $10k tournaments. A young Dominika Cibulková was Paterson's conqueror, 6–1, 6–2 in Amarante. She followed this up with a run to the second $10k final of her career (this one in Nottingham) where she lost a three-set battle with compatriot Anne Keothavong, 6–1, 6–7, 4–6. In late September, Paterson had the best result in a $50k of her career when she reached the quarterfinals in Batumi before losing to Ana Timotić. Nevertheless, this result was good enough to take her to a career-high ranking of No. 369 in the world. October saw her team up with Anne Keothavong to reach the doubles quarterfinal of a Tier-III event in Quebec City by battling to defeat Lauren Barnikow and Vilmarie Castellvi, 6–7, 7–6, 7–5. She and Keothavong were beaten by Marion Bartoli and María Emilia Salerni, 6–1, 6–3 in the quarterfinals. Her year-end ranking for singles was world No. 408.

=== 2006 ===
In January, Paterson reached the semifinals of her first $10k ITF tournament of the year in Hull and in March she reached the semifinals of yet another $10k, following this one up with a run to the quarterfinals of another $10k event in Bath, Somerset. She again received a wild card into the qualifying draw for Wimbledon but again failed to win a match, falling at the first hurdle to Margit Rüütel. In August, Paterson reached the quarterfinals in London ($10k) where she lost to Anna Fitzpatrick however she and Jane O'Donoghue joined forces to win the doubles title at this event. Paterson then headed to a $10k event in Mollerusa where she beat Yera Campos Molina 3–6, 7–5, 6–2 in the final to win the title. This was the first singles title of Paterson's career. After this, she reached one more $10k semifinal and a $25k quarterfinal and finished the year with a world ranking of No. 433.

=== 2007 ===
2007 could not have begun better for Paterson as she won her first ITF tournament of the season in Sunderland by beating Carla Suárez Navarro in the final in straight sets. She then went to Hull ($10k) and reached the quarterfinals (beating Suarez Navarro again in the second round). In February, Suarez Navarro managed to get some revenge by beating Paterson in the final round of qualifying for a $25k event in Tipton. Despite this, Paterson went on to reach the quarterfinals in Montechoro, another $10k. In June, Paterson was given wild cards into the qualifying events for the DFS Classic, the AEGON International, and Wimbledon where she was unable to win a match each time. She played her last professional match in August 2007 when she lost in the quarterfinals of a $10k tournament in London to Martina Babáková, 6–3, 2–6, 2–6.

== ITF finals ==
=== Singles (2–3) ===
Legend $100,000 tournaments $75,000 tournaments $50,000 tournaments $25,000 tournaments $10,000 tournaments	Finals by surface Hard (2–3) Clay (0–0) Grass (0–0) Carpet (0–0)

Outcome	No.	Date	Tournament	Surface	Opponent	Score
Runner-up	1.	10 August 2003	Wrexham	Hard	(Switzerland) Timea Bacsinszky	0–6, 3–6
Runner-up	2.	23 January 2005	Grenoble	Hard (i)	(Bosnia and Herzegovina) Mervana Jugić-Salkić	3–6, 1–6
Runner-up	3.	4 September 2005	Nottingham	Hard	(United Kingdom) Anne Keothavong	6–1, 6–7^{(4)}, 4–6
Winner	1.	3 September 2006	Mollerusa	Hard	(Spain) Yera Campos Molina	3–6, 7–5, 6–2
Winner	2.	21 January 2007	Sunderland	Hard (i)	(Spain) Carla Suárez Navarro	6–4, 6–2

=== Doubles (5–5) ===
Outcome	No.	Date	Tournament	Surface	Partner	Opponents	Score
Runner-up	1.	11 July 2004	Felixstowe	Grass	(United Kingdom) Helen Crook	(United Kingdom) Hannah Collin (United Kingdom) Anna Hawkins	4–6, 4–6
Winner	1.	28 November 2004	San Luis Potosí	Hard	(United Kingdom) Hannah Collin	(Croatia) Ivana Abramović (Croatia) Maria Abramović	6–4, 2–6, 6–2
Runner-up	2.	25 September 2005	Glasgow	Hard (i)	(United Kingdom) Anne Keothavong	(United Kingdom) Elena Baltacha (Estonia) Margit Rüütel	3–6, 7–6^{(2)}, 3–6
Runner-up	3.	13 August 2006	Wrexham	Hard	(United Kingdom) Jane O'Donoghue	(United Kingdom) Lindsay Cox (United Kingdom) Anna Hawkins	3–6, 3–6
Winner	2.	26 August 2006	London	Hard	(United Kingdom) Jane O'Donoghue	(United Kingdom) Laura Peterzan (United Kingdom) Emily Webley-Smith	6–3, 6–3
Runner-up	4.	2 September 2006	Mollerusa	Hard	(United Kingdom) Jane O'Donoghue	(Sweden) Michaela Johansson (Sweden) Nadja Roma	3–6, 6–2, 3–6
Winner	3.	1 October 2006	Nottingham	Hard	(United Kingdom) Melanie South	(United Kingdom) Katie O'Brien (Estonia) Margit Rüütel	6–2, 2–6, 7–6^{(1)}
Winner	4.	8 June 2007	Surbiton	Grass	(United Kingdom) Melanie South	(United Kingdom) Elena Baltacha (United Kingdom) Naomi Cavaday	6–1, 6–4
Winner	5.	14 July 2007	Felixstowe	Grass	(United Kingdom) Melanie South	(United Kingdom) Jade Curtis (United Kingdom) Rebecca Llewellyn	6–3, 6–3
Runner-up	5.	25 August 2007	London	Hard	(United Kingdom) Anna Hawkins	(Slovakia) Martina Babáková (United Kingdom) Anna Smith	2–6, 3–6
