= 2006 Fed Cup Europe/Africa Zone Group I – Pool B =

International tennis competition

Group B of the 2006 Fed Cup Europe/Africa Zone Group I was one of four pools in the Europe/Africa Zone Group I of the 2006 Fed Cup. Four teams competed in a round robin competition, with the top team and the bottom team proceeding to their respective sections of the play-offs: the top team played for advancement to the World Group II Play-offs, while the bottom team faced potential relegation to Group II.

		(Slovenia) SLO	(South Africa) RSA	(Serbia and Montenegro) SCG	(Denmark) DEN	RR; W–L	Set; W–L	Game; W–L	Standings
18	Slovenia		3–0	1–2	0–2	1–2	11–9	102–94	3
27	South Africa	0–3		0–3	0–3	0–3	1–18	34–114	4
31	Serbia and Montenegro	2–1	3–0		3–0	3–0	16–4	110–59	1
40	Denmark	2–0	3–0	0–3		2–1	11–8	92–71	2

== Slovenia vs. Serbia and Montenegro ==
Slovenia
1
TC Lokomotiv, Plovdiv, Bulgaria
18 April 2006
Red clay (outdoors)

Serbia and Montenegro
2

			1	2	3
1	(Slovenia) (Serbia and Montenegro)	Polona Reberšak; Ana Timotić	6; 3	6; 2
2	(Slovenia) (Serbia and Montenegro)	Maša Zec Peškirič; Ana Ivanovic	2; 6	2; 6
3	(Slovenia) (Serbia and Montenegro)	Tina Obrez / Maša Zec Peškirič; Ana Ivanovic / Danica Krstajić	4; 6	7; 5	6; 8

== South Africa vs. Denmark ==
South Africa
0
TC Lokomotiv, Plovdiv, Bulgaria
18 April 2006
Red clay (outdoors)

Denmark
3

			1	2	3
1	(South Africa) (Denmark)	Elze Potgieter; Karina-Ildor Jacobsgaard	2; 6	0; 6
2	(South Africa) (Denmark)	Alicia Pillay; Caroline Wozniacki	2; 6	0; 6
3	(South Africa) (Denmark)	Lizaan du Plessis / Alicia Pillay; Eva Dyrberg / Hanne Skak Jensen	2; 6	0; 6

== Slovenia vs. Denmark ==
Slovenia
0
TC Lokomotiv, Plovdiv, Bulgaria
19 April 2006
Red clay (outdoors)

Denmark
2

			1	2	3
1	(Slovenia) (Denmark)	Polona Reberšak; Karina-Ildor Jacobsgaard	3; 6	6; 1	1; 6
2	(Slovenia) (Denmark)	Maša Zec Peškirič; Caroline Wozniacki	4; 6	7^{7} 6^{1}	5; 7
3	(Slovenia) (Denmark)	Diana Nakič / Tina Obrez; Eva Dyrberg / Hanne Skak Jensen	1; 3			not completed

== South Africa vs. Serbia and Montenegro ==
South Africa
0
TC Lokomotiv, Plovdiv, Bulgaria
19 April 2006
Red clay (outdoors)

Serbia and Montenegro
3

			1	2	3
1	(South Africa) (Serbia and Montenegro)	Lizaan du Plessis; Danica Krstajić	0; 6	2; 6
2	(South Africa) (Serbia and Montenegro)	Alicia Pillay; Ana Ivanovic	0; 6	1; 6
3	(South Africa) (Serbia and Montenegro)	Elze Potgieter / Michelle Sammons; Danica Krstajić / Ana Timotić	1; 6	1; 6

== Slovenia vs. South Africa ==
Slovenia
3
TC Lokomotiv, Plovdiv, Bulgaria
20 April 2006
Red clay (outdoors)

South Africa
0

			1	2	3
1	(Slovenia) (South Africa)	Polona Reberšak; Elze Potgieter	6; 2	6; 3
2	(Slovenia) (South Africa)	Maša Zec Peškirič; Alicia Pillay	6; 3	6; 3
3	(Slovenia) (South Africa)	Diana Nakič / Tina Obrez; Alicia Pillay / Elze Potgieter	6^{7} 7^{9}	6; 1	6; 4

== Serbia and Montenegro vs. Denmark ==
Serbia and Montenegro
3
TC Lokomotiv, Plovdiv, Bulgaria
20 April 2006
Red clay (outdoors)

Denmark
0

			1	2	3
1	(Serbia and Montenegro) (Denmark)	Ana Timotić; Eva Dyrberg	2; 6	6; 4	6; 4
2	(Serbia and Montenegro) (Denmark)	Ana Ivanovic; Caroline Wozniacki	6; 3	6; 0
3	(Serbia and Montenegro) (Denmark)	Ana Ivanovic / Danica Krstajić; Karina-Ildor Jacobsgaard / Hanne Skak Jensen	6; 1	6; 3

== See also ==
- Fed Cup structure
