= AEGON Awards =

The Aegon British Tennis Awards are a set of monthly awards that are presented to current tennis players, who represent Great Britain and are deemed to have made the best performance and/or contribution to British tennis.

They were first awarded for January 2009. Each month three categories are presented to the recipients of Senior Player, Junior Player and Coach.

The Player and Junior Player Awards are selected by the performance board in the Player Team meeting at the National Tennis Centre. The board decide this from nominations given by top LTA national coaches, taking into consideration a combination of ranking improvements, outstanding performance and significant results.

The Coach of the Month is selected by the Head of Coaching and his team from the nominations put forward by LTA Licensed coaches. The winning coach being deemed to have had the greatest impact on British Tennis in the previous month.

== Award winners ==
=== 2009 ===
Month	Recipient		
Month	Senior	Junior	Coach
January	Anne Keothavong	Oliver Golding	Barry Scollo
February	Andy Murray	Laura Robson	Stuart Wilkinson
March	Katie O'Brien	Great Britain U14 Team	Martyn Bray
April	Andy Murray	Evan Hoyt	Paul Turner
May	James Ward	Eleanor Dean	Mark Walker
June	Colin Fleming; Ken Skupski	Eleanor Dean	Barbara Awbery
July	Andy Murray	Francesca Stephenson	Collen Mhlanga
August	Georgie Stoop	Kyle Edmund	Ian Zellner
September	Daniel Smethurst	Heather Watson	Nick Clark
October	Katie O'Brien	Great Britain U16 Team	David Wise
November	Colin Fleming; Ken Skupski	Lucy Brown	Vicky Broadbent
December	Naomi Broady	Luke Bambridge	Neil Frankel

=== 2010 ===
Month	Recipient		
Month	Senior	Junior	Coach
January	Andy Murray	Laura Robson	Lucy Taylor
February	Elena Baltacha	Connor Glennon	Callum Neil
March	Elena Baltacha	Maia Lumsden	Marc Codling
April	Anna Smith	Katy Dunne	Kathryn Charles
May	Alexander Slabinsky	Eleanor Dean	David & Marie Buzzard
June	Andy Murray	James Marselak	Toby Smith
July	Daniel Cox	Heather Watson	Matthew Fellingham
August	Elena Baltacha	GB Boys' 16U Davis Cup Team	Nigel Willard
September	Elena Baltacha	Oliver Golding	Dave Everington
October	Andy Murray	Josh Sapwell	Peter Harding
November	Andy Murray	Heather Watson	Oli Jones
December	Not awarded	George Morgan; Josh Sapwell	Vikki Paterson

=== 2011 ===
Month	Recipient		
Month	Senior	Junior	Coach
January	Andy Murray	George Morgan	John Hales
February	Heather Watson	GBR Under 16 Male Team	Metro Mustafa
March	Dan Evans	Anastasia Mikheeva	Paul Arnott
April	Andy Murray	Liam Broady	Anthony Reynolds
May	Heather Watson	Manisha Foster	Tom James
June	Andy Murray	Liam Broady	Mike Wisner
July	Josh Goodall	Freya Christie	Matt Smith
August	James Ward	GB 16U Davis Cup Team	Rachel Cocking
September	Andy Murray	Oliver Golding	Tom Walting
October	Anne Keothavong	Pete Ashley	Andrew Cook
November	Alexander Ward	Kyle Edmund	Tom Dyball
December	Alex Jewitt	Katie Boulter	Georgina Jackson

=== 2012 ===
Month	Recipient		
Month	Senior	Junior	Coach
January	Andy Murray	Maia Lumsden	Oli Jones
February	Dan Evans	GBR Under 14 Winter Cup Team	Dan Kiernan

=== 2013 ===
Month	Recipient		
Month	Senior	Junior	Coach
January	Andy Murray	Alfie Hewett	Lucy Dean
February	Great Britain Fed Cup Team	Great Britain 12U Winter Cups Team	Matt Thomas
March	Edward Corrie	Max Stewart	Hamid Hejazi
April	Great Britain Davis Cup Team	Alfie Hewett	Nick Line
May	Kyle Edmund	Great Britain Junior World Cup Team	Mike Barton
June	Andy Murray	Kyle Edmund	Emily Wharton
July	Johanna Konta	Josh Sapwell	Stuart Maidment
August	Dan Evans	Max Stewart	David Arulanandam
September			
October	Jamie Murray	Freya Christie	Steven Wigg
November	Jordanne Whiley	Freya Christie	Tom Crisp
December	Katy Dunne	Max Stewart	Dave Ireland
