= Rebecca Llewellyn =

British tennis player

- Country (sports): United Kingdom; Wales
- Residence: Welwyn, Hertfordshire, England
- Born: 5 October 1985 (age 39); Cardiff, Wales
- Height: 1.65 m (5 ft 5 in)
- Turned pro: September 2003
- Retired: September 2007
- Plays: Right-handed (two-handed backhand)
- Prize money: $58,304

Singles
- Career record: 97–108
- Career titles: 1 ITF
- Highest ranking: No. 280 (28 August 2006)

Grand Slam singles results
- Wimbledon: 1R (2005)

Doubles
- Career record: 58–45
- Career titles: 7 ITF
- Highest ranking: No. 309 (23 April 2007)

Grand Slam doubles results
- Wimbledon: 1R (2005, 2006)

Rebecca Llewellyn (born 5 October 1985) is a retired tennis player from Wales.

In her career, she won one title in singles and seven in doubles on the ITF Women's Circuit. She reached career-high rankings of world No. 280 in singles and No. 309 in doubles. She has not competed professionally since 2007.

== Career ==
=== Playing style ===
Rebecca began playing tennis aged seven in school. In 2003, she graduated from Haileybury High School.

She played right-handed and cited her favourite shots as the backhand and the volley. Her preferred playing surfaces were grass and clay.

=== Junior years (1999–2003) ===
Llewellyn played her first match on the junior ITF circuit in February 1999 and her last in June 2003 in the Junior Wimbledon Championships. Her best performances in singles came when she reached two semifinals of lower-tier junior events in 2000. She also reached the quarterfinals in one other event. In terms of Grand Slam success, her best singles result came at Wimbledon in 2000 when she won two matches to qualify and then went on to reach the second round. By the end of her junior career, she ended with a singles win–loss record of 11–14 and a career-high ranking of world No. 234 (achieved 25 June 2001).

As a junior doubles player she was a runner-up on one occasion. She was also a doubles semifinalist on another occasion. Rebecca competed in doubles at a Grand Slam only once, at the 2001 Wimbledon Championships, where she and compatriot Katie O'Brien were knocked out in round one. She ended her junior career with a win–loss record of 5–7 in doubles and a career-high doubles ranking of world No. 410 (achieved 16 April 2001).

=== Professional years ===
Llewellyn took part in the 2005 Wimbledon Championships, but lost 0–6, 1–6 to the fifth seed Svetlana Kuznetsova. In doing so, she became the first player from Wales to compete in singles since Sarah Loosemore in 1992. She also competed in the doubles event at the 2005 and the 2006 Wimbledon Championships, losing in the first round each time.

== ITF Circuit titles (8) ==
=== Singles (1) ===
No.	Date	Location	Category	Surface	Opponent	Score
1.	23 May 2005	Oxford, England	$10,000	Grass	(South Africa) Surina De Beer	0–6, 6–3, 6–3

=== Doubles (7) ===
No.	Date	Location	Category	Surface	Partners	Opponents	Scores
1.	26 January 2004	Tipton, England	$10,000	Hard	(United Kingdom) Melanie South	(Poland) Klaudia Jans (Poland) Alicja Rosolska	2–6, 6–1, 6–4
2.	7 April 2005	Bath, England	$10,000	Hard	(United Kingdom) Anna Hawkins	(Germany) Vanessa Pinto (Italy) Verdiana Verardi	3–6, 6–1, 6–4
3.	4 May 2005	Edinburgh, Scotland	$10,000	Clay	(United Kingdom) Melanie South	(Netherlands) Leonie Mekel (Netherlands) Bibiane Schoofs	6–0, 3–6, 6–3
4.	23 May 2005	Oxford, England	$10,000	Grass	(United Kingdom) Anna Hawkins	(United Kingdom) Melissa Berry (United Kingdom) Holly Richards	6–1, 6–4
5.	3 August 2005	Wrexham, Wales	$10,000	Hard	(United Kingdom) Anna Smith	(India) Rushmi Chakravarthi (New Zealand) Paula Marama	6–3, 7–5
6.	2 October 2006	Nantes, France	$25,000	Hard	(United Kingdom) Melanie South	(Germany) Sabine Lisicki (France) Irena Pavlovic	6–2, 6–0
7.	20 July 2007	Frinton, England	$10,000	Grass	(United Kingdom) Elizabeth Thomas	(United Kingdom) Samantha Murray (United States) Alexis Prousis	3–6, 7–5, 6–2

== ITF runner-ups (4) ==
=== Singles (1) ===
No.	Date	Location	Category	Surface	Opponent	Score
1.	15 February 2005	Portimão, Portugal	$10,000	Hard	(Spain) Lucia Jimenez Almendros	6–7^{(6–8)}, 4–6

=== Doubles (3) ===
No.	Date	Location	Category	Surface	Partner	Opponents	Score
1.	26 July 2004	Dublin, Ireland	$10,000	Carpet	(South Africa) Lizaan du Plessis	(Republic of Ireland) Yvonne Doyle (Republic of Ireland) Karen Nugent	4–6, 6–3, 2–6
2.	10 March 2005	Sunderland, England	$10,000	Hard	(South Africa) Lizaan du Plessis	(Austria) Verena Amesbauer (Czech Republic) Veronika Chvojková	3–6, 4–6
3.	10 July 2007	Felixstowe, England	$25,000	Grass	(United Kingdom) Jade Curtis	(United Kingdom) Karen Paterson (United Kingdom) Melanie South	3–6, 3–6
