= Sarah Borwell =

British tennis player

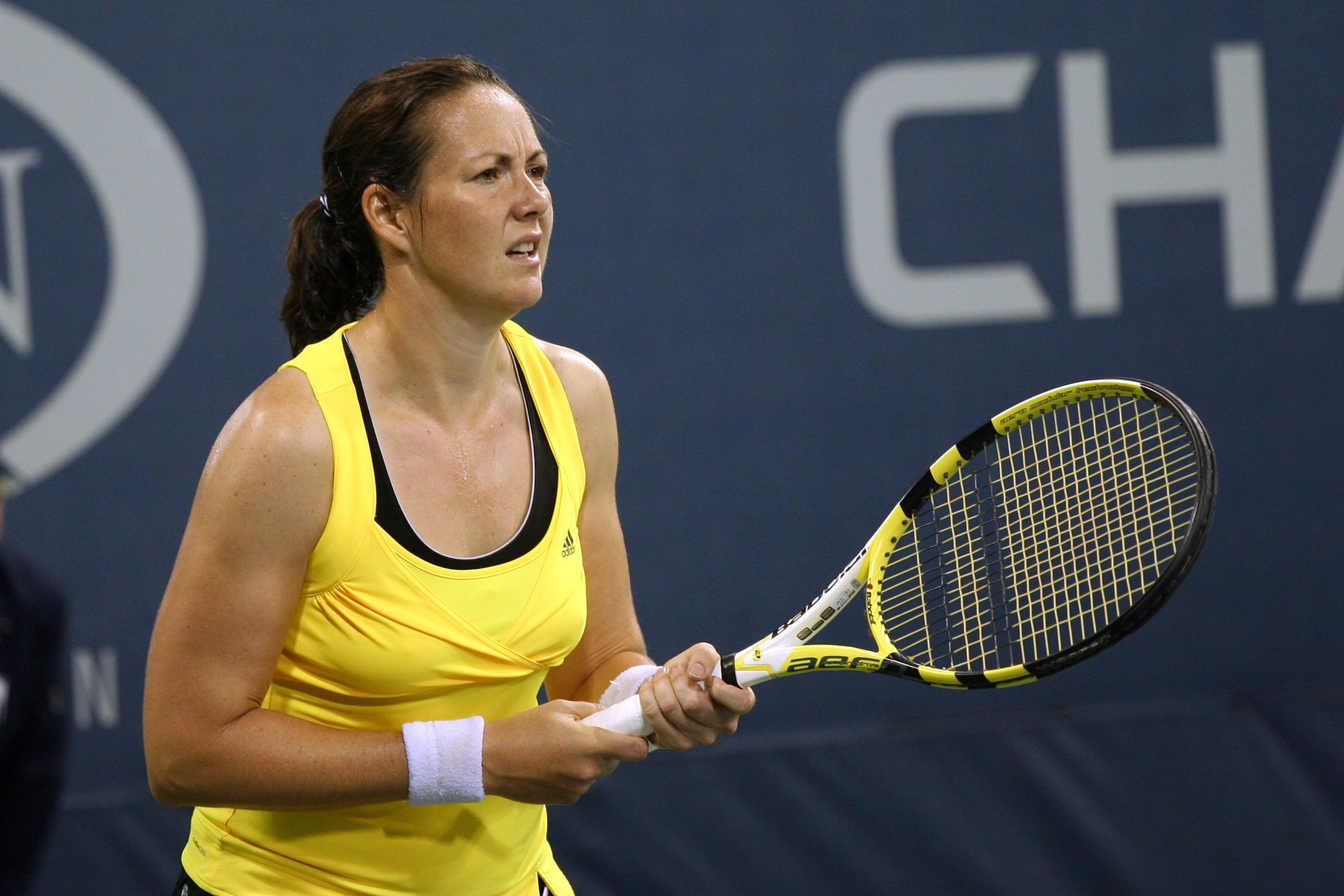
- Full name: Sarah Leah Borwell
- Country (sports): United Kingdom; England
- Residence: Middlesbrough, England
- Born: 20 August 1979 (age 46) Middlesbrough
- Turned pro: 2002
- Retired: 1 October 2013
- Plays: Right-handed (two-handed backhand)
- Prize money: $262,551

Singles
- Career record: 159–157
- Career titles: 3 ITF
- Highest ranking: No. 199 (10 July 2006)

Grand Slam singles results
- French Open: Q1 (2007)
- Wimbledon: 2R (2006)
- US Open: Q1 (2006)

Doubles
- Career record: 128–166
- Career titles: 8 ITF
- Highest ranking: No. 65 (9 August 2010)

Grand Slam doubles results
- Australian Open: 2R (2010)
- French Open: 1R (2009, 2010)
- Wimbledon: 1R (2003, 2004, 2005, 2006, 2007, 2008, 2009, 2010, 2011)
- US Open: 1R (2009)

Sarah Borwell
Medal record

Tennis

Representing England

Commonwealth Games
Bronze medal – third place	2010 Delhi	Mixed doubles

Sarah Leah Borwell (born 20 August 1979) is an English former professional tennis player who enjoyed her greatest success in doubles. She was the British number one in doubles. Her career-high doubles ranking is 65, set on 9 August 2010, and her career-high singles ranking is 199, which she reached on 10 July 2006.

== Early life ==
Borwell was born in Middlesbrough. She attended Nunthorpe School, where Jonathan Woodgate and Liam Plunkett were fellow students, she even shared a class and school football team with Woodgate who is a year her junior at The Avenue Primary school, where dual year classes were present. She was a regular player for the Schools boys football team, more than holding her own and deserving her place in the team. and Prior Pursglove College in Guisborough. She won a tennis scholarship to the University of Houston, where she was ranked as high as #8 in the NCAA and completed a business degree.

Her father is a scout at Aston Villa F.C., and her mother coaches Mini Tennis and is a supervisor for school sports.

== Career ==
=== 2002 ===
Borwell made her professional debut in August 2002 at the ITF Circuit tournament held in Bath, England where she suffered a first round defeat. She played four more tournaments that year and reached the quarterfinals of two of them (both on clay). The season ended with Borwell ranked world No. 744.

=== 2003 ===
She began 2003 with another quarter-final loss in January and two months later made her first appearance in an ITF tournament final, losing in straight sets to Australian Lisa McShea, 6–1, 6–4. She notched up one more semifinal loss and another quarterfinal loss in ITF events before making her debut on the WTA Tour at the Tier III Birmingham Classic. She experienced a defeat in the first round of qualifying at the hands of a young future world No. 1, Maria Sharapova. Borwell was then granted a wildcard into the qualifying event of her home Grand Slam tournament, Wimbledon, where she was defeated in straight sets by Argentine Gisela Dulko in the first round. She spent the rest of the year on the ITF Circuit, reaching two more semifinals (one as a qualifier), and finished 2003 ranked 349.

=== 2004 ===
2004 was a year of first and second round defeats for Borwell. She played the entire year on the ITF Circuit, reaching only one quarterfinal and one semifinal (albeit as a qualifier) and as such her year-end ranking fell 68 places to No. 417.

=== 2005 ===
She made a more promising start to 2005, reaching the quarterfinals in her second ITF tournament of the season and the semifinals in her third. She again played on the ITF Circuit until June when she was again given a wildcard into the Tier III Birmingham Classic qualifying rounds. She managed to go one better than her previous year's appearance at the tournament by beating 16th seed Sunitha Rao in three tight sets, before losing to eighth seed Rika Fujiwara from Japan. Another wildcard followed, but this time into the main draw of Wimbledon where her opponent in round one was American, Shenay Perry. Despite a valiant performance in a first set tie-break (which she eventually lost 11–13) she lost the match in two sets. The rest of her year was spent playing ITF tournaments where she reached one quarterfinal. She did, however, beat two women ranked higher than herself to qualify for the Tier III Bell Challenge held in Quebec City, Canada in November. She lost in the first round to Emma Laine of Finland. 2005 ended with Borwell ranked 331.

=== 2006 ===
In February 2006, Borwell attempted to qualify for the Bangalore Open, a Tier III tournament held in India. She lost to Akgul Amanmuradova, 2–6, 1–6. March saw success for Borwell as she reached the semifinals of ITF Sunderland before losing to Gaëlle Widmer, 1–6, 3–6. This was immediately followed by her first ever title in Sheffield where she did not drop a single set en route to the final in which she defeated Nadja Roma in three sets. Two consecutive first-round losses followed before a quarterfinal loss to Anne Keothavong in the ITF tournament held in Madras. May saw another ITF final appearance for Borwell in Nagano where she was forced to retire after losing a close first set 7–5 to Tomoko Yonemura. In June, Borwell had her first victory in the main draw of a WTA Tour event after being given a wildcard into the Birmingham Classic and defeating fellow Briton Melanie South in three sets. Jamea Jackson beat her in the second round. Two consecutive wild cards followed, the first into the main draw of the Eastbourne International (where she did not make it past the first round) and the second into the main draw of Wimbledon. She had a shock victory here by winning her first-round match against world No. 66, Marta Domachowska. This set up a second round match against future world No. 1, Ana Ivanovic, which she lost, 1–6, 2–6. Following Wimbledon, Borwell reached the quarterfinals of one ITF tournament that year and was beaten in the first round of qualifying of the US Open by Stéphanie Cohen-Aloro. Her ranking was 218 at the end of this season.

=== 2007 ===
From January to June 2007, Borwell played on the ITF Circuit. She reached three quarterfinals in this time. Then, she participated in the French Open qualifying tournament where she was beaten by Stéphanie Dubois. She lost in qualifying for the Birmingham Classic, Eastbourne International and Wimbledon, before reaching the quarterfinals of the ITF tournament held in Felixstowe. Her next tournament was another ITF event, this one held in Frinton where she defeated fellow Brit Jade Curtis in the final. The second ITF title of her career. This was followed by another quarterfinal appearance in an ITF tournament before she lost in the qualifying rounds for three consecutive WTA tournaments. One more quarterfinal in an ITF event rounded off her results for 2007. She finished the year at a ranking of 264.

=== 2008 ===
Borwell spent most of 2008 playing on the ITF Circuit, reaching two consecutive finals in March in Dijon and Bath. She lost the first to Olga Brózda and won the second by defeating Stéphanie Vongsouthi. In July she reached her only other singles final of the ITF season in the Felixstowe tournament, losing to Neuza Silva, 3–6, 2–6. Her participation on the WTA Tour that year consisted of four losing efforts as she attempted to qualify for the Birmingham Classic, the Slovenia Open, the Nordic Light Open and the Bell Challenge. Borwell was awarded a wildcard into the qualifying draw of Wimbledon where she was beaten by Yaroslava Shvedova, in three sets. In November, Borwell made the decision to stop playing singles and become a doubles specialist.

=== 2009–2010 ===
With her doubles ranking high enough for her to enter the main draw of many WTA Tour tournaments without having to qualify. She reached the quarterfinals of four International tournaments: Birmingham Classic, Hobart International, Mexican Open and the Monterrey Open. She also made the semifinal of the main tour event in Bad Gastein. In 2010, Borwell teamed up full-time with American Raquel Kops-Jones. So far, they had made three quarterfinals but their highlight has been a semifinal in the WTA Tour events at Ponte Vedra Beach and Stanford.

Both the French Open and Wimbledon proved to be a frustrating experience for Borwell and Kops-Jones. Although sandwiched between both tournaments, they picked up an ITF title in Nottingham (defeating Naomi Broady and Katie O'Brien in the final) they suffered first round defeats in both major events. At the French they came up against nemesis' and eventual finalists Katarina Srebotnik and Květa Peschke and were thrashed 6–0, 6–1. At Wimbledon, they played a high quality game against fifth seeds Liezel Huber and Bethanie Mattek-Sands. They played the first two centre court before bad light forced the match to be resumed the next day, at one set all. where Huber and Mattek prevailed 7–5 in the decider. Borwell did, however, win a round with Colin Fleming in the mixed doubles, before losing in the second to top seeds Nenad Zimonjić and Sam Stosur.

In July, Borwell teamed up with Martina Hingis and Scoville Jenkins to form the New York Buzz team at the World TeamTennis championships. Although they struggled and were the least successful team, Borwell and Jenkins registered a very impressive mixed doubles success against John McEnroe and Kim Clijsters.

At the Silicon Valley Classic, Borwell and Jones caused a huge upset in round one as they defeated Lisa Raymond and Rennae Stubbs, 6–0, 4–6, [12–10]. On the win Borwell said 'We deserved that.' They reached the semifinal despite Borwell being hit on the head with a 10–6 champion tie-break win against Lilia Osterloh and Riza Zalameda, Borwell said this win was more important than their first-round win. The blow to the head, Borwell received in that match turned out to be a brain bleed that kept her out of action for about a month, causing her to miss the US Open.

Borwell returned to action at the Commonwealth Games in Delhi, competing for England in both the women's and mixed doubles. Anna Smith and Ken Skupski were her respective partners. Borwell and Smith were seeded second, however could not live up to that ranking losing their quarterfinal match in straight sets. Borwell and Skupski, however, combined well eventually winning the bronze medal, defeating Smith and partner Ross Hutchins.

=== 2011–2012 ===
In 2011, Borwell reached the first round in doubles of both the Australian Open and Wimbledon Championships but lost both times.

== ITF Circuit finals ==
Legend
$100,000 tournaments
$75,000 tournaments
$50,000 tournaments
$25,000 tournaments
$10,000 tournaments

=== Singles (3–4) ===
Result	No.	Date	Tournament	Surface	Opponent	Score
Loss	1.	30 March 2003	ITF Albury, Australia	Grass	(Australia) Lisa McShea	1–6, 4–6
Win	1.	19 March 2006	ITF Sheffield, UK	Hard (i)	(Sweden) Nadja Roma	4–6, 6–1, 6–4
Loss	2.	28 May 2006	ITF Nagano, Japan	Carpet	(Japan) Tomoko Yonemura	7–5, ret.
Win	2.	21 July 2007	ITF Frinton, UK	Grass	(United Kingdom) Jade Curtis	6–4, 1–6, 6–3
Loss	3.	16 March 2008	ITF Dijon, France	Hard (i)	(Poland) Olga Brózda	5–7, 6–4, 4–6
Win	3.	23 March 2008	GB Pro-Series Bath, UK	Hard (i)	(France) Stéphanie Vongsouthi	6–4, 7–6^{(7–5)}
Loss	4.	13 July 2008	ITF Felixstowe, UK	Grass	(Portugal) Neuza Silva	3–6, 2–6

=== Doubles (8–5) ===
Result	No.	Date	Tournament	Surface	Partner	Opponents	Score
Loss	1.	30 March 2003	ITF Albury, Australia	Grass	(Australia) Bree Calderwood	(Chinese Taipei) Chuang Chia-jung (New Zealand) Ilke Gers	1–6, 5–7
Win	1.	24 October 2004	ITF Bolton, UK	Hard	(United Kingdom) Emily Webley-Smith	(United Kingdom) Hannah Collin (United Kingdom) Anna Hawkins	7–5, 1–6, 6–2
Win	2.	7 August 2005	Vancouver Open, Canada	Hard	(United States) Sarah Riske	(United States) Lauren Barnikow (Germany) Antonia Matic	6–4, 3–6, 7–6^{(7–0)}
Loss	2.	15 July 2006	ITF Felixstowe, UK	Grass	(United Kingdom) Jane O'Donoghue	(Australia) Trudi Musgrave (Australia) Christina Wheeler	2–6, 4–6
Win	3.	9 November 2007	ITF Port Pirie, Australia	Hard	(United States) Courtney Nagle	(Australia) Daniella Dominikovic (Australia) Emily Hewson	6–2, 6–2
Win	4.	22 February 2008	ITF Capriolo, Italy	Carpet (i)	(South Africa) Kelly Anderson	(Croatia) Darija Jurak (Croatia) Ivana Lisjak	7–6^{(9–7)}, 6–4
Loss	3.	22 March 2008	GB Pro-Series Bath, UK	Hard (i)	(United Kingdom) Olivia Scarfi	(Slovakia) Martina Babáková (Czech Republic) Iveta Gerlová	1–6, 7–5, [1–10]
Win	5.	10 May 2008	ITF Irapuato, Mexico	Hard	(United States) Robin Stephenson	(Switzerland) Stefania Boffa (Czech Republic) Nikola Fraňková	6–4, 3–6, [10–4]
Loss	4.	6 June 2008	Surbiton Trophy, UK	Grass	(United Kingdom) Elizabeth Thomas	(United States) Julie Ditty (United States) Abigail Spears	6–7^{(2–7)}, 2–6
Win	6.	12 July 2008	ITF Felixstowe, UK	Grass	(United States) Courtney Nagle	(Czech Republic) Nikola Fraňková (United Kingdom) Anna Hawkins	7–5, 6–3
Loss	5.	28 September 2008	GB Pro-Series Shrewsbury, UK	Hard (i)	(United States) Courtney Nagle	(United Kingdom) Anna Smith (Sweden) Johanna Larsson	6–7^{(6–8)}, 4–6
Win	7.	23 November 2008	ITF Odense, Denmark	Carpet (i)	(United States) Courtney Nagle	(Czech Republic) Gabriela Chmelinová (Bosnia and Herzegovina) Mervana Jugić-Salkić	6–4, 6–4
Win	8.	31 May 2010	Nottingham Trophy, UK	Grass	(United States) Raquel Kops-Jones	(United Kingdom) Naomi Broady (United Kingdom) Katie O'Brien	6–3, 2–6, [10–7]

== Performance timelines ==
Key
W	F	SF	QF	#R	RR	Q#	DNQ	A	NH

(W) winner; (F) finalist; (SF) semifinalist; (QF) quarterfinalist; (#R) rounds 4, 3, 2, 1; (RR) round-robin stage; (Q#) qualification round; (DNQ) did not qualify; (A) absent; (NH) not held; (SR) strike rate (events won / competed); (W–L) win–loss record.

=== Singles ===
Tournament	2003	2004	2005	2006	2007	2008	Win–Loss
Australian Open	A	A	A	A	A	A	0–0
French Open	A	A	A	A	Q1	A	0–0
Wimbledon	Q1	A	1R	2R	Q2	Q1	1–2
US Open	A	A	A	Q1	A	A	0–0
Year-end ranking	349	417	331	218	264	363	1–2

=== Doubles ===
Tournament	2003	2004	2005	2006	2007	2008	2009	2010	2011	Win–Loss
Australian Open	A	A	A	A	A	A	A	2R	1R	1–2
French Open	A	A	A	A	A	A	1R	1R	A	0–2
Wimbledon	1R	1R	1R	1R	1R	1R	1R	1R	1R	0–9
US Open	A	A	A	A	A	A	1R	A	A	0–1
Year-end ranking	556	441	343	244	482	123	78	69	325	1–14

=== Mixed doubles ===
Tournament	2003	2004	2005	2006	2007	2008	2009	2010	Win–Loss
Australian Open	A	A	A	A	A	A	A	A	0–0
French Open	A	A	A	A	A	A	A	A	0–0
Wimbledon	1R	A	A	A	1R	1R	2R	2R	2–5
US Open	A	A	A	A	A	A	A	A	0–0

=== Fed Cup ===
==== Doubles (5–3) ====
Europe/Africa Group I
Date	Venue	Surface	Round	Opp. Country	Final match score	Partner	Opponents	Rubber score
4–7 Feb 2009	Tallinn	Hard (i)	RR	Hungary	3–0	Melanie South	Marosi/Szávay	6–4, 6–3 (W)
4–7 Feb 2009	Tallinn	Hard (i)	RR	Netherlands	3–0	Anne Keothavong	Thyssen/Wong	6–4, 6–0 (W)
4–7 Feb 2009	Tallinn	Hard (i)	RR	Luxembourg	3–0	Melanie South	Minella/Thill	w/o (W)
4–7 Feb 2009	Tallinn	Hard (i)	PO (Promotional)	Poland	1–2	Anne Keothavong	Jans-Ignacik/Rosolska	5–7, 3–6 (L)
3–6 Feb 2010	Lisbon	Hard (i)	RR	Bosnia and Herzegovina	3–0	Elena Baltacha	Husarić/Martinović	6–3, 6–2 (W)
3–6 Feb 2010	Lisbon	Hard (i)	RR	Austria	0–3	Anne Keothavong	Mayr-Achleitner/Meusburger	4–6, 4–6 (L)
3–6 Feb 2010	Lisbon	Hard (i)	RR	Belarus	2–1	Elena Baltacha	Govortsova/Poutchek	3–6, 7–5, 6–2 (W)
3–6 Feb 2010	Lisbon	Hard (i)	PO (5th–8th)	Netherlands	1–2	Katie O'Brien	Hogenkamp/Thyssen	2–6, 4–6 (L)
