= Jane O'Donoghue =

British tennis player

Jane O’Donoghue
- Country (sports): United Kingdom; England
- Residence: Ashton-in-Makerfield, Greater Manchester
- Born: 29 March 1983 (age 41); Higher End, Wigan, Greater Manchester
- Height: 1.72 m (5 ft 8 in)
- Turned pro: 2000
- Retired: 2007
- Plays: Right-handed
- Prize money: $177,156

Singles
- Career record: 153–174
- Career titles: 3 ITF
- Highest ranking: No. 189 (26 July 2004)

Grand Slam singles results
- Wimbledon: 2R (2004, 2005)

Doubles
- Career record: 93–95
- Career titles: 6 ITF
- Highest ranking: 184 (22 August 2005)

Grand Slam doubles results
- Wimbledon: 2R (2005)

Jane O'Donoghue (born 29 March 1983) is a retired British tennis player who turned professional in 2000 and played her last match on the pro circuit in 2007. During her career, she won three ITF singles and six ITF doubles titles. In July 2006, she reached a career-high singles ranking of 189, and over one year later, she reached 184 in the world in the doubles rankings. O'Donoghue reached the second round of her Grand Slam, Wimbledon in 2004 and 2005. After retirement, she began working for the LTA as a coach.

== Personal life ==
O'Donoghue was born in the Metropolitan Borough of Wigan in Greater Manchester in 1983. Her father John is a PE teacher, her mother works in a bank, and her two older brothers, Paul and Mark, both studied at the University of Oxford. She has 10 GCSEs all of which are grade A. She began playing tennis at age 9 and turned professional at the age of 17.

== Career ==
=== Junior (1997–2001) ===
O'Donoghue competed on the junior ITF Circuit from July 1997 until June 2001. She won one singles title over the course of her four-year career, at the 2001 Japan Open Junior Championships, and she was a semifinalist four times and a quarterfinalist on eight occasions. She reached the second round of Wimbledon twice in 2000 and 2001 but her greatest junior Grand Slam success came in 2001 when Jane reached the third round of the Australian Open. Her junior career ended with a singles win–loss record of 40–32 and a career-high ranking of world No. 28 (achieved 2 January 2001).

O'Donoghue won her only junior doubles title in August 1999 partnering Elena Baltacha. She also reached three more finals, three semifinals and seven quarterfinals

=== 1998–2001 ===
O'Donoghue played her first match on the adult ITF Circuit in September 1998 in the qualifying draw for the $10k in Sunderland. She finished the season without a world ranking.

She attempted to qualify for three $10k events in 1999 but did not win a match. She again finished the season without a world ranking.

O'Donoghue started her 2000 season with her first main draw ITF appearance courtesy of a wildcard into the $10k event in Hatfield. In August, O'Donoghue reached the final of a $10k. She finished the year with a ranking of world no. 564. Her year-end ranking at the end of 2001 was world No. 471.

=== 2002 ===
In January 2002, O'Donoghue won her first professional title in Bournemouth Two weeks later, she won the second ITF title of her career in Hatfield. She received a wildcard into the main draw of Wimbledon where she lost to the top seed Venus Williams in the first round. In the second half of the year, she reached two quarterfinals of $25k tournaments and finished the year with a ranking of world No. 295.

=== 2003 ===
In May, she reached the final of the $10k event in Edinburgh. She was given a wildcard into Wimbledon and was beaten in round one by Marlene Weingärtner. Her season-ending ranking was world No. 235.

=== 2004 ===
At Wimbledon, O'Donoghue beat Lindsay Lee-Waters in the first round to give her the first Grand Slam main-draw victory of her career. She finished the year as world No. 231.

=== 2005 to 2007 ===
In 2005, she again was given a wildcard into Wimbledon, losing to Nathalie Dechy in the second round. Her year-end ranking in 2005 was world No. 250, and her season-ending ranking in 2006 was world No. 336. She retired from professional tennis in April 2007.

== ITF Circuit finals ==
=== Singles: 6 (3–3) ===
Legend $100,000 tournaments $75,000 tournaments $50,000 tournaments $25,000 tournaments $10,000 tournaments	Finals by surface Hard (1–2) Clay (2–1) Grass (0–0) Carpet (0–0)

Result	W–L	Date	Tournament	Tier	Surface	Opponent	Score
Loss	0–1	7 Aug 2000	ITF Bath, Great Britain	10,000	Hard	(Germany) Susi Bensch	4–6, 7–6^{(7–5)}, 2–6
Win	1–1	29 Apr 2002	ITF Bournemouth, Great Britain	10,000	Clay	(Republic of Ireland) Yvonne Doyle	6–3, 6–4
Win	2–1	14 May 2002	ITF Hatfield, Great Britain	10,000	Clay	(Russia) Ekaterina Sysoeva	7–6^{(7–6)}, 6–1
Loss	2–2	5 May 2003	ITF Edinburgh, Great Britain	10,000	Clay	(Netherlands) Elise Tamaëla	3–6, 3–6
Loss	2–3	14 Aug 2006	ITF Wrexham, Great Britain	10,000	Hard	(France) Irena Pavlovic	3–6, 7–6^{(7–6)}, 6–7^{(5–7)}
Win	3–3	7 Mar 2007	ITF Jersey, Great Britain	10,000	Hard	(Switzerland) Gaëlle Widmer	4–6, 6–2, 6–4

=== Doubles: 11 (6–5) ===
Legend $100,000 tournaments $75,000 tournaments $50,000 tournaments $25,000 tournaments $10,000 tournaments	Finals by surface Hard (4–3) Clay (1–1) Grass (1–1) Carpet (0–0)

Result	W–L	Date	Tournament	Tier	Surface	Partnering	Opponents	Score
Win	1–0	29 Apr 2002	ITF Bournemouth, Great Britain	10,000	Clay	(United Kingdom) Anna Hawkins	(Turkey) İpek Şenoğlu (Greece) Christina Zachariadou	6–0, 6–0
Loss	1–1	14 May 2002	ITF Hatfield, Great Britain	10,000	Clay	(United Kingdom) Anna Hawkins	(Russia) Irina Bulykina (Russia) Ekaterina Sysoeva	6–4, 4–6, 6–7^{(8–10)}
Loss	1–2	25 Nov 2002	ITF Mount Gambier, Australia	25,000	Hard	(South Africa) Chanelle Scheepers	(Australia) Daniella Dominikovic (Australia) Evie Dominikovic	w/o
Win	2–2	12 Oct 2004	ITF Sunderland, Great Britain	25,000	Hard	(United Kingdom) Elena Baltacha	(Slovakia) Eva Fislová (Slovakia) Stanislava Hrozenská	6–1, 4–6, 6–2
Win	3–2	18 Jan 2005	ITF Tipton, Great Britain	10,000	Hard	(South Africa) Surina De Beer	(United Kingdom) Katie O'Brien (United Kingdom) Melanie South	6–4, 6–2
Loss	3–3	10 Jul 2006	ITF Felixstowe, Great Britain	25,000	Grass	(United Kingdom) Sarah Borwell	(Australia) Trudi Musgrave (Australia) Christina Wheeler	2–6, 4–6
Win	4–3	17 Jul 2006	ITF Frinton, Great Britain	10,000	Grass	(United Kingdom) Georgie Gent	(United Kingdom) Danielle Brown (Serbia) Ana Četnik	6–4, 4–6, 6–2
Loss	4–4	7 Aug 2006	ITF Wrexham, Great Britain	10,000	Hard	(United Kingdom) Karen Paterson	(United Kingdom) Lindsay Cox (United Kingdom) Anna Hawkins	3–6, 3–6
Win	5–4	22 Aug 2006	ITF Cumberland, Great Britain	10,000	Hard	(United Kingdom) Karen Paterson	(United Kingdom) Laura Peterzen (United Kingdom) Emily Webley-Smith	6–3, 6–3
Loss	5–5	28 Aug 2006	ITF Mollerusa, Spain	10,000	Hard	(United Kingdom) Karen Paterson	(Sweden) Michaela Johansson (Sweden) Nadja Roma	3–6, 6–2, 3–6
Win	6–5	14 Mar 2007	ITF Sunderland, Great Britain	10,000	Hard	(United Kingdom) Anna Hawkins	(Germany) Ria Dörnemann (United Kingdom) Emily Webley-Smith	6–4, 6–7^{(5–7)}, 6–3

== Grand Slam performance timeline ==
Key
W	F	SF	QF	#R	RR	Q#	DNQ	A	NH

(W) winner; (F) finalist; (SF) semifinalist; (QF) quarterfinalist; (#R) rounds 4, 3, 2, 1; (RR) round-robin stage; (Q#) qualification round; (DNQ) did not qualify; (A) absent; (NH) not held; (SR) strike rate (events won / competed); (W–L) win–loss record.

Tournament	2000	2001	2002	2003	2004	2005	2006	2007	Career W–L
Australian Open	A	A	A	A	A	A	A	A	0–0
French Open	A	A	A	A	A	A	A	A	0–0
Wimbledon	LQ	LQ	1R	1R	2R	2R	LQ	A	2–4
US Open	A	A	A	LQ	LQ	LQ	A	A	0–0
Win–loss	0–0	0–0	0–1	0–1	1–1	1–1	0–0	0–0	2–4
Year-end ranking	564	474	295	235	231	250	336	656	–
