= Katie O'Brien =

British tennis player (born 1986)

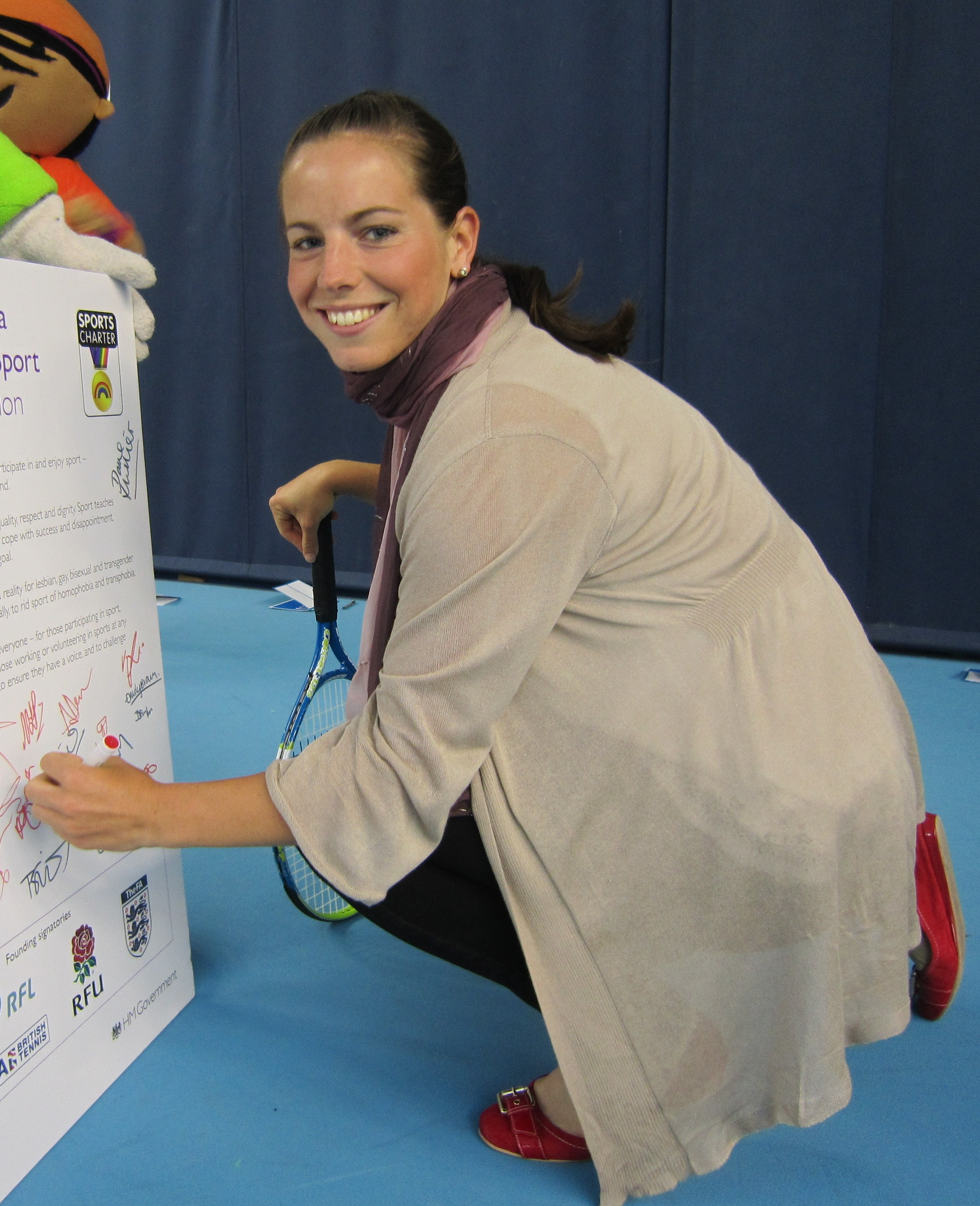
- O'Brien in 2012
- Full name: Katie Jill O'Brien
- Country (sports): Great Britain; England
- Residence: London, England
- Born: 2 May 1986 (age 40) Beverley, England
- Height: 1.67 m (5 ft 6 in)
- Turned pro: 2004
- Retired: 12 August 2011
- Plays: Right-handed (two-handed backhand)
- Prize money: $525,141

Singles
- Career record: 283–231
- Career titles: 4 ITF
- Highest ranking: No. 84 (1 February 2010)

Grand Slam singles results
- Australian Open: 2R (2010)
- French Open: 1R (2009, 2010)
- Wimbledon: 2R (2007)
- US Open: Q3 (2010)

Doubles
- Career record: 101–119
- Career titles: 2 ITF
- Highest ranking: No. 174 (8 October 2007)

Grand Slam doubles results
- Wimbledon: 1R (2005, 2006, 2008, 2009, 2010)

Grand Slam mixed doubles results
- Wimbledon: 2R (2008)

Katie Jill O'Brien (born 2 May 1986) is a British former professional tennis player from Beverley, Yorkshire. She was briefly the British No. 1 tennis player, and reached her career-high singles ranking of world No. 84 on 1 February 2010. She won four singles and two doubles titles on the ITF Women's Circuit.

In 2007, she reached the second round of her home Grand Slam, Wimbledon, by beating Sandra Klösel in round one. She lost to the No. 31 seed, Michaëlla Krajicek, in the second round. In 2010, she replicated this achievement by beating Patricia Mayr to reach the second round of the Australian Open where she fell to eighth seeded Jelena Janković.

== Personal life ==
O'Brien's parents are Phil and Jill O'Brien. Her father is a quantity surveyor, and her mother is a nursery school teacher. Her brother James, and sister, Holly, both have been awarded the Development Coach Award, a licence to coach tennis from the Lawn Tennis Association.

O'Brien attended Hymers College, Hull from 1997 to 2002. She studied her A-levels at Woodhouse Grove School in Leeds from 2002 to 2004. She began studying business studies with the Open University in 2008, pursuing studies while competing professionally.

== Career ==
=== Juniors (2000–2004) ===
O'Brien played her first match on the ITF Junior Circuit in February 2000 and her last in June 2004. During her junior career, she won two titles—the Team Leschly Danish Junior Cup in February 2002 and the Vierumaki Junior Cup in October the same year. She also reached a total of five semifinals and three quarterfinals overall. Her best result in a junior major tournament came in the 2003 Wimbledon Championships where she reached round three, before losing to Emma Laine, 1–6, 5–7. Her career-high junior singles ranking was world No. 101, reached on 15 September 2003, and her overall win–loss record in singles was 44–34.

In addition to her singles success as a junior, she also won one doubles title, lost in the final of another, reached four doubles semifinals and seven doubles quarterfinals (one of which in the 2004 Wimbledon Championships, partnering compatriot Melanie South). She reached her career–high doubles ranking of world No. 201 on 3 February 2003, and ended her junior career with a win–loss record of 17–26.

=== 2001–2004 ===
O'Brien played her first match on the ITF Women's Circuit in September 2001 when she attempted to qualify for a $10k event in Sunderland. She lost in the second round of qualifying for this tournament.

One year later, in September 2002, she reached her first quarterfinal as a qualifier in the $10k event in Sunderland and was beaten by fellow Brit Anne Keothavong, 6–0, 6–1. This was her only quarterfinal appearance in 2002 and she finished the year with a ranking of world No. 693.

In 2003 she again reached only one quarterfinal, this one in the $10k tournament in Felixstowe. In every other tournament she played she either lost in the first round or the qualifying stages. As a result, her year-end ranking fell from the previous year to world No. 742.

In May 2004, O'Brien played her first ever semifinal on the ITF Circuit against Elke Clijsters (the sister of former world No. 1 Kim Clijsters) and was beaten 6–3, 7–5. She was given a wildcard into the main draw of her home Grand Slam tournament in Wimbledon for the first time in her career in June 2004. She lost in the first round, 4–6, 4–6 to María Sánchez Lorenzo. Following Wimbledon, she played twelve more tournaments on the ITF Circuit, reaching the final of one (Manchester, $10k), the semifinals of three of them and the quarterfinals of two more. Her end-of-year ranking was world No. 401.

=== 2005 ===
The 2005 season started well for O'Brien; she reached the finals of her first two ITF tournaments (in Tipton and Hull) and won the second of the two. In her third tournament, Sunderland, she reached the quarterfinals but was beaten by compatriot, Elena Baltacha, 6–4, 6–3. Her second quarterfinal of the year was in Oxford.

In June, she received three wildcards into three consecutive WTA Tour tournaments; the Birmingham Classic qualifying draw, the Eastbourne International Championships qualifying draw and Wimbledon main draw. She failed to qualify in the first two tournaments and lost to Kim Clijsters, 2–6, 3–6, in the first round of Wimbledon.

Following Wimbledon she entered the $25k tournament in Felixstowe and reached the semifinals before losing to Jarmila Gajdošová, 4–6, 4–6. She competed in twelve more ITF tournaments that year (reaching the quarterfinals in six of them) and the qualifying tournament for the Luxembourg Open where she reached the second round of qualifying. She finished the 2005 season with a ranking of world No. 263.

=== 2006 ===
In January, O'Brien reached yet another ITF quarterfinal, this one in Hull, and the very next month she progressed to the semifinals of the $25k tournament in Sunderland, before easily losing to Anne Keothavong in two sets. She reached the semifinals of the $50k event in Fukuoka, Japan where she was beaten by Ayumi Morita.

She again spent June attempting to qualify for the Birmingham Classic and the Eastbourne International without success. She also competed in the Wimbledon main draw but again lost in round one, against Tathiana Garbin in three sets.

After this she lost to Monique Adamczak in the quarterfinals of the $25k event in Valladolid in July and she reached the final of the ITF tournament in Changsha ($25k) in August. Two consecutive $25k finals followed in September; the second of which she won. Her good form continued into October and November when she reached the quarterfinals, semifinals and quarterfinals of $25k tournaments in Glasgow, Istanbul and Jakarta, respectively. Her final ranking of 2006 was world No. 193.

=== 2007 ===
O'Brien's first tournament of the 2007 season was the qualifying event for the Australian Open where she beat Chen Yanchong in a marathon three-setter (3–6, 6–2, 8–7 ret.) to set up a second-round clash with Anastasia Pavlyuchenkova which she lost. She then returned to the ITF Circuit until May. During this time she played in ten ITF tournaments, reaching the quarterfinal stages in four of them (two $50k events and two $25k events). She then attempted to qualify for the French Open but was beaten by Florence Haring, in three sets.

O'Brien's grass court season began with another ITF quarterfinal, this one in Surbiton ($25k). She then tried to qualify for the Tier III tournament, the Birmingham Classic but was beaten in another tough three-set match, 7–6, 5–7, 7–6, by compatriot Sarah Borwell. O'Brien had more success trying to qualify for the Tier II Eastbourne International where she beat Yuan Meng, Tsvetana Pironkova and Jill Craybas to qualify. She faced Vasilisa Bardina in the first round of the main tournament and had enough momentum carried over from the qualifying rounds to defeat her as well, 7–5, 6–3. Her opponent in the round of 16 was No. 4 seed, Elena Dementieva who proved too much for the Brit. She beat O'Brien by a score of 6–3, 6–4. The confidence and experience she gained helped her capitalise on a wildcard into the main draw of Wimbledon; she beat Sandra Klösel in round one, 6–3, 7–5, (by coming back from 3–5 down in the second set) before being demolished in the second round by 31st seed, Michaëlla Krajicek, 6–0, 6–1.

O'Brien spent August trying to qualify for the Carson Classic (Tier II), the Roger's Cup (Tier I) and the final major of the year, the US Open. She failed to win a match in any of these qualifying tournaments. In September she managed to reach the final round of qualifying in a Tier IV WTA tournament, the Slovenia Open in Portorož and just a few weeks later reached the quarterfinals of the main draw of a Tier IV event, the Tashkent Open, for the first time in her career before losing to Olga Govortsova, 2–6, 3–6. She played six more $25k tournaments that year, reaching the semifinals in four of them and the final of another. She finished 2007 with a ranking of world No. 134.

=== 2008 ===
O'Brien's first tournament of the season was the Australian Open where she entered qualifying as the No. 15 seed. After being gifted an easy first round victory over Darya Kustova when Kustova had to retire with the score at 6–3, 1–0 in O'Brien's favour, O'Brien was forced to fight hard in her second qualifying match against Yanina Wickmayer. She eventually won, 4–6, 6–3, 8–6, to set up a final round qualifying match against the No. 11 seed in the qualifying tournament, Yuan Meng. O'Brien was defeated 6–4, 6–2. In early February, she competed as part of the Great Britain Fed Cup team in the Fed Cup and was given tough opponents. She challenged Patty Schnyder but eventually lost, 6–7, 5–7, and also lost to Ágnes Szávay and Caroline Wozniacki. However, she and Anne Keothavong managed to save Britain from relegation from the Europe/Africa Group I by winning two singles matches against Portugal. This was followed by O'Brien's first appearance on the ITF Circuit in 2008 which came at the $75k event in Midland where she was the No. 5 seed. She faced the No. 2 seed, Laura Granville, in the quarterfinals and was beaten, 1–6, 6–3, 6–1. O'Brien then attempted to qualify for four consecutive WTA Tour events, in Doha, Dubai, Bangalore and Indian Wells. She lost in round one of qualifying in each of them with the exception of Indian Wells where she lost in the round two of qualifying to Barbora Záhlavová-Strýcová. Over March and April she reached the quarterfinals of two ITF tournaments: Jersey ($25k) and Saint-Malo ($100k). In May, O'Brien entered the French Open qualifying draw and beat fellow Brit, Melanie South in the opening round. She fell in round two to Kristina Barrois, 4–6, 2–6, and then headed to Birmingham where she beat Alla Kudryavtseva, before falling to Yaroslava Shvedova in round two. A wildcard allowed O'Brien entry into the International Women's Open (previously the Hastings Direct International) where she lost to Samantha Stosur. Shahar Pe'er beat O'Brien then in the first round of Wimbledon.

Following the third major of the season, O'Brien participated in the Internazionali di Palermo where Lourdes Domínguez Lino beat O'Brien in round one. Two weeks later she reached the second round of the Slovenia Open by beating No. 5 seed, Tsvetana Pironkova, in round one. She lost to Vera Dushevina in the second round. In August, she reached the second round of qualifying for the US Open before being knocked out by home favourite, Alexa Glatch. September saw O'Brien fall to Raluca Olaru in round one of the Tashkent Open and in October she reached the semifinals of the $50k event in Barnstaple where she lost to Anne Keothavong. She reached two more ITF quarterfinals in 2008, in Phoenix and Saint-Denis, both $25k. Her year-end ranking was world No. 154.

=== 2009 ===
O'Brien started her 2009 season by attempting to qualify for the Auckland Open in New Zealand. She came up against the No. 2 seed in the qualifying tournament, Ayumi Morita, and lost in three sets. Her next tournament was the qualifying event for the first major of the year, the Australian Open. She beat Sandra Záhlavová, Julie Ditty and Betina Jozami to gain entry into the main draw for the first time in her career. She faced Monica Niculescu in round one but lost, 4–6, 4–6. Nevertheless, the 2009 Australian Open marked the first time since the 1992 US Open that four British women had competed in the main draw of a Grand Slam tournament other than Wimbledon. O'Brien's three compatriots were Anne Keothavong, Melanie South and fellow qualifier, Elena Baltacha. Following the Australian Open, O'Brien returned to ITF action as the No. 3 seed at the $25k event in Sutton. She won four matches in straight sets before defeating wildcard Johanna Konta, 3–6, 6–2, 6–4, in the final to win her first title since September 2006 and the third ITF singles title of her career. Between this and the French Open she reached the semifinals of ITF tournaments in Midland ($75k), Biberach ($50k) and Johannesburg ($100k) as well as reaching the quarterfinals of a $100k+H event in Torhout. She also won a $25k in Jersey and was the runner-up in another $25k event, this one in Minsk. In May she reached the final round of qualifying for the French Open before losing to Arantxa Rus, 4–6, 6–7, however she gained entry to the main draw as a lucky loser when No. 6 seed Vera Zvonareva withdrew from the tournament due to injury. O'Brien lost to Olga Govortsova 1–6, 1–6, in the first round.

O'Brien began her grass-court season as the No. 5 seed in a $50k in Nottingham but she was beaten in the second round by Naomi Cavaday, 6–2, 6–3. She was then given a wildcard into the main draw of the Birmingham Classic where she was drawn to face fellow British wildcard entrant, Melanie South. O'Brien eventually lost in three sets, 6–4, 1–6, 7–6. Immediately following this she went on to fall in the second round of qualifying for the Eastbourne International to the world No. 46, Ekaterina Makarova, 4–6, 2–6. Another wildcard then granted O'Brien entry to the main draw of Wimbledon where she lost, 2–6, 7–5, 4–6, in round one to world No. 35, Iveta Benešová. After Wimbledon, a number of first and second round defeats followed before O'Brien reached the final of another $25k in July. She was beaten in the final by fellow Brit Georgie Stoop. In August, O'Brien was the No. 3 seed in the qualifying tournament for the US Open but she was stopped in round two of qualifying by lower-ranked Anna Tatishvili. In late September, she reached the final of a $75k in Shrewsbury as the sixth seed where she came up against fellow Brit and fifth seed Elena Baltacha. O'Brien lost in three sets, 3–6, 6–4, 3–6, but this result was enough to move both finalists into the top 100 for the first time in their careers. Over the course of her final few tournaments of the year, O'Brien reached another $100k semifinal as well as the second round of the Japan Open where she was swept aside 6–0, 6–1 by top seed Caroline Wozniacki. She finished the year inside the top 100 with a ranking of world No. 90.

=== 2010 ===
O'Brien started 2010 by attempting to qualify for the Auckland Classic but lost her opening match 1–6, 5–7 to Canadian Valérie Tétreault. She moved onto the WTA Premier event in Sydney and lost 3–6, 3–6 to Anastasia Rodionova in the first round of qualifying. On 11 January O'Brien, achieved a new career-high ranking of 87. Playing in the main draw of the Australian Open for the second successive year, O'Brien defeated Austrian Patricia Mayr 6–3, 6–3 in the opening round for her second career-victory in a major. In the second round, O'Brien faced the eighth seed and former world No. 1, Jelena Janković, and put in a spirited performance but went down 2–6, 2–6. O'Brien is expected to move to a new career-high ranking after the Australian Open.

=== 2011 ===
O'Brien kicked off her 2011 season at the Auckland Open. Her ranking was not high enough for her to be directly accepted into the main draw, so she entered the qualifying tournament. In the first round, she defeated Emily Fanning of New Zealand, 6–2, 6–2, and in the second round No. 4 seed 7–5, 6–3, but lost to Noppawan Lertcheewakarn and did not win a place in the main draw.

O'Brien then got a wildcard into the 2011 Wimbledon Championships, where she faced Kimiko Date-Krumm in the first round. However, she lost in under an hour, and became the first player eliminated from the main draw in the tournament. On 12 August 2011, she announced her retirement at the age of 25.

== ITF Circuit finals ==
=== Singles: 15 (4 titles, 11 runner-ups) ===
Legend $75,000 tournaments (0–1) $25,000 tournaments (3–8) $10,000 tournaments (1–2)	Finals by surface Hard (4–9) Clay (0–1) Grass (0–1)

Result	Date	Tier	Tournament	Surface	Opponent	Score
Loss	13 September 2004	10,000	ITF Manchester, Great Britain	Hard (i)	(Germany) Andrea Sieveke	4–6, 6–7^{(4–7)}
Loss	19 January 2005	10,000	ITF Tipton, Great Britain	Hard (i)	(Russia) Irina Bulykina	7–6^{(7–5)}, 2–6, 4–6
Win	24 January 2005	10,000	ITF Hull, Great Britain	Hard (i)	(Uzbekistan) Ivanna Israilova	6–4, 6–4
Loss	1 August 2006	25,000	ITF Changsha, China	Hard	(China) Chen Yanchong	1–6, 1–6
Loss	19 September 2006	25,000	ITF Madrid, Spain	Hard	(France) Olivia Sanchez	7–6^{(9–7)}, 4–6, 4–6
Win	26 September 2006	25,000	ITF Nottingham, Great Britain	Hard	(United Kingdom) Amanda Keen	5–7, 7–6^{(7–3)}, 6–4
Loss	17 October 2007	25,000	ITF Glasgow, Great Britain	Hard (i)	(Sweden) Sofia Arvidsson	3–6, 1–6
Win	3 February 2009	25,000	ITF Sutton, Great Britain	Hard (i)	(Australia) Johanna Konta	3–6, 6–2, 6–4
Loss	3 March 2009	25,000	ITF Minsk, Belarus	Carpet (i)	(Belarus) Darya Kustova	7–6^{(7–3)}, 1–6, 4–6
Win	25 March 2009	25,000	ITF Jersey, Great Britain	Hard (i)	(France) Claire Feuerstein	7–5, 1–0 ret.
Loss	28 July 2009	25,000	ITF Vigo, Spain	Hard	(United Kingdom) Georgie Gent	5–7, 2–6
Loss	22 September 2009	75,000	ITF Shrewsbury, Great Britain	Hard	(United Kingdom) Elena Baltacha	3–6, 6–4, 3–6
Loss	13 July 2010	25,000	ITF Woking, Great Britain	Hard	(Hungary) Tímea Babos	5–7, 4–6
Loss	27 July 2010	25,000	ITF Vigo, Spain	Hard	(Czech Republic) Andrea Hlaváčková	2–6, 0–6
Loss	22 February 2011	25,000	ITF Mildura, Australia	Grass	(Chinese Taipei) Hsieh Su-wei	1–6, 2–6

=== Doubles: 11 (2 titles, 9 runner-ups) ===
Legend $50,000 tournaments (0–1) $25,000 tournaments (2–6) $10,000 tournaments (0–2)	Finals by surface Hard (2–8) Grass (0–1)

Result	Date	Tier	Tournament	Surface	Partnering	Opponents	Score
Loss	20 January 2005	ITF $10,000	Tipton, Great Britain	Hard (i)	(United Kingdom) Melanie South	(South Africa) Surina De Beer (United Kingdom) Jane O'Donoghue	4–6, 2–6
Loss	24 January 2005	ITF $10,000	Hull, Great Britain	Hard (i)	(United Kingdom) Melanie South	(Russia) Irina Bulykina (Russia) Vasilisa Davydova	6–4, 3–6, 5–7
Loss	2 February 2006	ITF $25,000	Jersey, Great Britain	Hard (i)	(United Kingdom) Melanie South	(Czech Republic) Andrea Hlaváčková (Croatia) Matea Mezak	3–6, 1–6
Win	19 September 2006	ITF $25,000	Madrid, Spain	Hard	(Romania) Sorana Cîrstea	(France) Céline Cattaneo (Switzerland) Gaëlle Widmer	6–4, 6–4
Loss	27 September 2006	ITF $25,000	Nottingham, Great Britain	Hard	(Estonia) Margit Rüütel	(United Kingdom) Karen Paterson (United Kingdom) Melanie South	2–6, 6–2, 6–7^{(1–7)}
Win	12 October 2006	ITF $25,000	Jersey, Great Britain	Hard (i)	(Estonia) Margit Rüütel	(Czech Republic) Veronika Chvojková (United Kingdom) Claire Peterzan	7–5, 6–4
Loss	19 October 2006	ITF $25,000	Glasgow, Great Britain	Hard (i)	(Estonia) Margit Rüütel	(Czech Republic) Veronika Chvojková (Latvia) Līga Dekmeijere	4–6, 3–6
Loss	23 October 2006	ITF $25,000	Istanbul, Turkey	Hard (i)	(Romania) Sorana Cîrstea	(Bosnia and Herzegovina) Mervana Jugić-Salkić (Turkey) İpek Şenoğlu	w/o
Loss	11 October 2007	ITF $25,000	Jersey, Great Britain	Hard (i)	(United Kingdom) Georgie Gent	(Czech Republic) Andrea Hlaváčková (Czech Republic) Lucie Hradecká	0–6, 4–6
Loss	3 February 2009	ITF $25,000	Sutton, Great Britain	Hard (i)	(Canada) Rebecca Marino	(United States) Raquel Kops-Jones (Czech Republic) Renata Voráčová	3–6, 3–6
Loss	31 May 2010	ITF $50,000	Nottingham, Great Britain	Grass	(United Kingdom) Naomi Broady	(United Kingdom) Sarah Borwell (United States) Raquel Kops-Jones	3–6, 6–2, [7–10]

== Performance timelines ==
Key
W	F	SF	QF	#R	RR	Q#	DNQ	A	NH

(W) winner; (F) finalist; (SF) semifinalist; (QF) quarterfinalist; (#R) rounds 4, 3, 2, 1; (RR) round-robin stage; (Q#) qualification round; (DNQ) did not qualify; (A) absent; (NH) not held; (SR) strike rate (events won / competed); (W–L) win–loss record.

=== Singles ===
Tournament	2004	2005	2006	2007	2008	2009	2010	2011	Career W–L
Australian Open	A	A	A	Q2	Q3	1R	2R	Q1	1–2
French Open	A	A	A	Q1	Q2	1R	1R	A	0–2
Wimbledon	1R	1R	1R	2R	1R	1R	1R	1R	1–8
US Open	A	A	Q1	Q1	Q2	Q2	Q3	A	0–0
Year-end ranking	401	263	193	134	154	88	180	257	2–12

=== Doubles ===
Tournament	2005	2006	2007	2008	2009	2010	2011	Career W–L
Australian Open	A	A	A	A	A	A	A	0–0
French Open	A	A	A	A	A	A	A	0–0
Wimbledon	1R	1R	A	1R	1R	1R	Q1	0–5
US Open	A	A	A	A	A	A	A	0–0
Year-end ranking	358	181	191	353	376	311	530	0–5

=== Mixed doubles ===
Tournament	2007	2008	2009	Career W-L
Australian Open	A	A	A	0–0
French Open	A	A	A	0–0
Wimbledon	1R	2R	2R	2–3
US Open	A	A	A	0–0

=== Fed Cup ===
Europe/Africa Group I
Date	Venue	Surface	Round	Opponents	Final match score	Match	Opponent	Rubber score
21–23 April 2005	Antalya	Clay	RR	Denmark	2–1	Doubles (with Jane O'Donoghue)	Jacobsgaard/Jensen	3–6, 6–7^{(5–7)} (L)
21–23 April 2005	Antalya	Clay	RR	Serbia and Montenegro	1–2	Doubles (with Jane O'Donoghue)	Timotić/Zarić	6–2, 6–4 (W)
21–23 April 2005	Antalya	Clay	PO (9th–12th)	Ukraine	1–2	Singles	Valeria Bondarenko	6–3, 6–3 (W)
21–23 April 2005	Antalya	Clay	PO (9th–12th)	Ukraine	1–2	Doubles (with Jane O'Donoghue)	A.Bondarenko/V.Bondarenko	3–6, 2–6 (L)
30 January – 2 February 2008	Budapest	Carpet (i)	RR	Switzerland	1–2	Singles	Patty Schnyder	6–7^{(5–7)}, 5–7 (L)
30 January – 2 February 2008	Budapest	Carpet (i)	RR	Hungary	1–2	Singles	Ágnes Szávay	1–6, 2–6 (L)
30 January – 2 February 2008	Budapest	Carpet (i)	RR	Denmark	1–2	Singles	Caroline Wozniacki	2–6, 6–1, 2–6 (L)
30 January – 2 February 2008	Budapest	Carpet (i)	PO (Relegation)	Portugal	2–0	Singles	Magali de Lattre	6–4, 6–2 (W)
3–6 February 2010	Lisbon	Hard (i)	RR	Bosnia and Herzegovina	3–0	Singles	Ema Burgić	6–2, 6–0 (W)
3–6 February 2010	Lisbon	Hard (i)	RR	Belarus	2–1	Singles	Olga Govortsova	3–6, 3–6 (L)
3–6 February 2010	Lisbon	Hard (i)	PO (5th–8th)	Netherlands	1–2	Singles	Arantxa Rus	5–7, 6–3, 4–6 (L)
3–6 February 2010	Lisbon	Hard (i)	PO (5th–8th)	Netherlands	1–2	Doubles (with Sarah Borwell)	Hogenkamp/Thijssen	2–6, 4–6 (L)

Preceded by Anne Keothavong; Anne Keothavong; Anne Keothavong; Anne Keothavong; Anne Keothavong	British Tennis number one 7 May 2007 – 15 May 2007; 25 June 2007 – 23 September 2007; 26 November 2007 – 13 April 2008; 21 April 2008 – 14 June 2008; 9 November 2009 – 29 November 2009	Succeeded by Anne Keothavong; Anne Keothavong; Anne Keothavong; Anne Keothavong; Elena Baltacha
