= Michaela Johansson =

Swedish tennis player

- Full name: Michaela Johansson
- Country (sports): Sweden
- Born: 6 March 1988 (age 38) Stockholm, Sweden
- Plays: Right-handed
- Prize money: $40,552

Singles
- Highest ranking: No. 305 (24 March 2008)

Doubles
- Highest ranking: No. 400 (24 March 2008)

Michaela Johansson (born 6 March 1988) is a former professional tennis player from Sweden.

== Biography ==
A right-handed player from Stockholm, Johansson was a top-50 ranked junior. She debuted for the Sweden Fed Cup team as a 16-year old in 2004, featuring in a doubles rubber against Serbia and Montenegro.

As a wildcard at the 2007 Nordic Light Open, held in her home city, she made her first WTA Tour main draw, beaten in three sets by Klára Zakopalová in the opening round.

Across 2007 and 2008 she appeared in two further Fed Cup ties for Sweden, against Estonia and Belarus respectively.

Johansson competed in the main draw at the 2009 Swedish Open in Bastad, where she made it through from the qualifying draw.

== ITF finals ==
=== Singles: 2(1–1) ===
$100,000 tournaments
$75,000 tournaments
$50,000 tournaments
$25,000 tournaments
$10,000 tournaments

Outcome	No.	Date	Tournament	Surface	Opponent	Score
Runner-up	1.	5 November 2006	Stockholm, Sweden	Hard (i)	(Sweden) Mari Andersson	6–3, 3–6, 2–6
Winner	2.	25 February 2008	Wellington, New Zealand	Hard	(Australia) Marija Mirkovic	6–0, 7–5

=== Doubles: 6 (2-4) ===
Outcome	No.	Date	Tournament	Surface	Partner	Opponents	Score
Runner-up	1.	9 July 2004	Sidi Fredj, Algeria	Clay	(Sweden) Jennifer Elie	(India) Sai Jayalakshmy Jayaram (New Zealand) Shelley Stephens	3–6, 1–6
Winner	2.	21 May 2006	Falkenberg, Sweden	Clay	(Sweden) Mari Andersson	(Germany) Anne Schäfer (Germany) Julia Paetow	6–2, 6–0
Runner-up	3.	29 July 2006	Gausdal, Norway	Hard	(Norway) Karoline Borgersen	(Sweden) Mari Andersson (Sweden) Nadja Roma	4–6, 0–6
Winner	4.	3 September 2006	Mollerusa, Spain	Hard	(Sweden) Nadja Roma	(United Kingdom) Jane O'Donoghue (United Kingdom) Karen Paterson	6–3, 2–6, 6–3
Runner-up	5.	22 July 2007	Hamilton, Canada	Clay	(Colombia) Paula Zabala	(Canada) Stéphanie Dubois (South Africa) Surina De Beer	walkover
Runner-up	6.	12 September 2008	Rockhampton, Australia	Hard	(Slovakia) Jarmila Gajdošová	(Japan) Remi Tezuka (China) Zhou Yimiao	6–7^{(2–7)}, 4–6

== See also ==
- List of Sweden Fed Cup team representatives
