= Anna Hawkins =

English tennis player

- Country (sports): United Kingdom
- Born: 7 July 1984 (age 41) Devizes, England
- Turned pro: 1999
- Retired: 2009
- Plays: Right-handed (two-handed backhand)
- Prize money: $52,030

Singles
- Career record: 48–99
- Highest ranking: 581 (7 July 2003)

Grand Slam singles results
- Wimbledon: Q1 (2003, 2005)

Doubles
- Career record: 149–120
- Career titles: 0 WTA, 16 ITF
- Highest ranking: 215 (29 September 2003)

Grand Slam doubles results
- Wimbledon: 2R (2003)

Anna Hawkins (born 7 July 1984) is an English former professional tennis player.

In her career, Hawkins won sixteen doubles titles on the ITF Women's Circuit. On 7 July 2003, she reached her best singles ranking of world number 581. On 29 September 2003, she peaked at number 215 in the WTA doubles rankings.

Hawkins retired from professional tennis in 2009.

== ITF finals ==
=== Doubles (16–12) ===
$100,000 tournaments
$75,000 tournaments
$50,000 tournaments
$25,000 tournaments
$10,000 tournaments

Result	No.	Date	Tournament	Surface	Partner	Opponents	Score
Win	1.	25 September 2000	Glasgow, Scotland	Hard (i)	(United Kingdom) Abigail Tordoff	(United Kingdom) Julia Smith (Japan) Remi Tezuka	6–2, 6–2
Loss	1.	21 September 2001	Sunderland, England	Hard (i)	(United Kingdom) Cristelle Grier	(Republic of Ireland) Yvonne Doyle (Republic of Ireland) Karen Nugent	6–4, 2–6, 1–6
Win	2.	29 April 2002	Bournemouth, England	Clay	(United Kingdom) Jane O'Donoghue	(Turkey) İpek Şenoğlu (Greece) Christina Zachariadou	6–0, 6–0
Loss	2.	14 May 2002	Hatfield, England	Clay	(United Kingdom) Jane O'Donoghue	(Russia) Irina Bulykina (Russia) Ekaterina Sysoeva	6–4, 4–6, 6–7^{(8)}
Win	3.	4 August 2002	Dublin, Ireland	Grass	(Australia) Nicole Kriz	(United Kingdom) Rebecca Rankin (Serbia) Višnja Vuletić	6–2, 7–5
Loss	3.	10 February 2003	Albufeira, Portugal	Hard	(France) Kildine Chevalier	(Italy) Silvia Disderi (Italy) Giulia Meruzzi	2–6, 4–6
Loss	4.	28 April 2003	Bournemouth, England	Clay	(Republic of Ireland) Claire Curran	(Netherlands) Marielle Hoogland (Netherlands) Elise Tamaëla	6–3, 2–6, 3–6
Win	4.	5 May 2003	Edinburgh, Scotland	Clay	(Republic of Ireland) Claire Curran	(Germany) Jacqueline Fröhlich (Germany) Daniela Salomon	w/o
Win	5.	4 May 2004	Edinburgh, Scotland	Clay	(South Africa) Nicole Rencken	(Russia) Raissa Gourevitch (Russia) Ekaterina Kozhokina	7–6^{(3)}, 6–2
Win	6.	15 May 2004	Santa Cruz de Tenerife, Spain	Hard	(Brazil) Larissa Carvalho	(Austria) Eva-Maria Hoch (Germany) Martina Pavelec	2–6, 6–1, 7–6^{(4)}
Win	7.	5 July 2004	Felixstowe, England	Grass	(United Kingdom) Hannah Collin	(United Kingdom) Helen Crook (United Kingdom) Karen Paterson	6–4, 6–4
Loss	5.	15 August 2004	Hampstead, England	Hard	(South Africa) Nicole Rencken	(India) Rushmi Chakravarthi (India) Sania Mirza	3–6, 2–6
Loss	6.	14 September 2004	Manchester, England	Hard (i)	(United Kingdom) Hannah Collin	(Finland) Emma Laine (Finland) Essi Laine	4–6, 4–6
Loss	7.	19 October 2004	Bolton, England	Hard (i)	(United Kingdom) Hannah Collin	(United Kingdom) Sarah Borwell (United Kingdom) Emily Webley-Smith	5–7, 6–1, 2–6
Win	8.	7 April 2005	Bath, England	Hard (i)	(United Kingdom) Rebecca Llewellyn	(Germany) Vanessa Pinto (Italy) Verdiana Verardi	3–6, 6–1, 6–4
Loss	8.	27 April 2005	Bournemouth, England	Clay	(United Kingdom) Holly Richards	(United Kingdom) Claire Peterzan (United Kingdom) Melanie South	7–5, 4–6, 3–6
Win	9.	23 May 2005	Oxford, England	Grass	(United Kingdom) Rebecca Llewellyn	(United Kingdom) Melissa Berry (United Kingdom) Holly Richards	6–1, 6–4
Win	10.	5 April 2006	Bath, England	Hard (i)	(United Kingdom) Lindsay Cox	(United Kingdom) Melissa Berry (United Kingdom) Anna Smith	6–3, 6–2
Win	11.	7 August 2006	Wrexham, Wales	Hard	(United Kingdom) Lindsay Cox	(United Kingdom) Jane O'Donoghue (United Kingdom) Karen Paterson	6–3, 6–3
Win	12.	8 November 2006	Redbridge, England	Hard (i)	(United Kingdom) Anna Smith	(United Kingdom) Holly Richards (United Kingdom) Elizabeth Thomas	6–3, 6–3
Win	13.	7 March 2007	Jersey, United Kingdom	Hard (i)	(United Kingdom) Elizabeth Thomas	(France) Céline Cattaneo (Switzerland) Gaëlle Widmer	6–1, 6–3
Win	14.	14 March 2007	Sunderland, England	Hard (i)	(United Kingdom) Jane O'Donoghue	(Germany) Ria Dörnemann (United Kingdom) Emily Webley-Smith	6–4, 6–7^{(5)}, 6–3
Loss	9.	28 March 2007	Bath, England	Hard (i)	(United Kingdom) Elizabeth Thomas	(United Kingdom) Laura Haberkorn (Netherlands) Pauline Wong	1–6, 6–3, 1–6
Win	15.	8 May 2007	Edinburgh, Scotland	Clay	(United Kingdom) Elizabeth Thomas	(Russia) Elena Kulikova (Russia) Anastasia Pivovarova	3–6, 6–0, 6–4
Loss	10.	25 August 2007	London, England	Hard	(United Kingdom) Karen Paterson	(Slovakia) Martina Babáková (United Kingdom) Anna Smith	2–6, 3–6
Loss	11.	15 March 2008	Las Palmas de Gran Canaria, Spain	Hard	(Greece) Anna Gerasimou	(Spain) Marta Marrero (Spain) María José Martínez Sánchez	2–6, 6–7^{(1)}
Win	16.	29 April 2008	Coatzacoalcos, Mexico	Hard	(United Kingdom) Anna Fitzpatrick	(Argentina) María Irigoyen (Argentina) Agustina Lepore	6–2, 6–2
Loss	12.	12 July 2008	Felixstowe, England	Grass	(Czech Republic) Nikola Fraňková	(United Kingdom) Sarah Borwell (United States) Courtney Nagle	5–7, 3–6

== Grand Slam doubles performance timeline ==
Key
W	F	SF	QF	#R	RR	Q#	DNQ	A	NH

(W) winner; (F) finalist; (SF) semifinalist; (QF) quarterfinalist; (#R) rounds 4, 3, 2, 1; (RR) round-robin stage; (Q#) qualification round; (DNQ) did not qualify; (A) absent; (NH) not held; (SR) strike rate (events won / competed); (W–L) win–loss record.

Tournament	2002	2003	2004	2005	2006	2007	2008	W-L
Australian Open	A	A	A	A	A	A	A	0–0
French Open	A	A	A	A	A	A	A	0–0
Wimbledon	1R	2R	1R	1R	A	A	1R	1–5
US Open	A	A	A	A	A	A	A	0–0
Win–loss	0–1	1–1	0–1	0–1	0–0	0–0	0–1	1–5
