= List of Sweden Fed Cup team representatives =

This is a list of tennis players who have represented the Sweden Fed Cup team in an official Fed Cup match. Sweden have taken part in the competition since 1964.

== Players ==
Player	W-L (Total)	W-L (Singles)	W-L (Doubles)	Ties	Debut
Ellen Allgurin	4 – 3	1 – 1	3 – 2	6	2009
Mari Andersson	4 – 0	-	4 – 0	4	2006
Helena Anliot	12 – 5	4 – 2	8 – 3	13	1974
Sofia Arvidsson	50 – 38	36 – 24	14 – 14	50	2000
Katarina Bartholdson	1 – 1	1 – 0	0 – 1	1	1964
Mirjam Björklund	0 – 1	-	0 – 1	2	2018
Nina Bohm	4 – 4	1 – 3	3 – 1	4	1978
Anna Brazhnikova	2 – 0	-	2 – 0	2	2010
Jacqueline Cabaj Awad	1 – 5	0 – 1	1 – 4	7	2016
Susanne Celik	0 – 5	0 – 4	0 – 1	4	2015
Cecilia Dahlman	7 – 5	6 – 4	1 – 1	11	1989
Helena Dahlström	0 – 4	0 – 2	0 – 2	2	1986
Elisabeth Ekblom	1 – 3	0 – 3	1 – 0	3	1978
Frida Engblom	2 – 4	-	2 – 4	6	1999
Sofia Finér	2 – 1	-	2 – 1	3	1997
Margareta Forsgårdh	3 – 2	3 – 2	-	5	1974
Catrin Jexell	4 – 5	1 – 1	3 – 4	7	1982
Michaela Johansson	1 – 2	1 – 0	0 – 2	3	2004
Jonna Jonerup	3 – 1	0 – 1	3 – 0	4	1988
Carina Karlsson	2 – 7	2 – 4	0 – 3	7	1984
Karolina Karlsson	0 – 1	-	0 – 1	1	1985
Johanna Larsson	46 – 28	30 – 18	16 – 10	41	2005
Catarina Lindqvist	12 – 18	11 – 10	1 – 8	22	1981
Annica Lindstedt	2 – 2	-	2 – 2	4	1995
Maria Lindström	9 – 13	1 – 1	8 – 12	22	1985
Cornelia Lister	6 – 7	4 – 3	2 – 4	10	2016
Ingrid Löfdahl Bentzer	15 – 16	9 – 8	6 – 8	19	1966
Eva Lundqvist	2 – 3	1 – 1	1 – 2	3	1966
Monica Lundqvist	0 – 3	0 – 1	0 – 2	2	1986
Diana Majkic	2 – 5	1 – 3	1 – 2	6	1999
Sousan Massi	0 – 2	0 – 1	0 – 1	1	2005
Hilda Melander	2 – 2	0 – 1	2 – 1	4	2012
Hanna Nooni	4 – 10	2 – 6	2 – 4	8	2003
Helena Olsson	1 – 1	-	1 – 1	2	1983
Rebecca Peterson	6 – 8	4 – 5	2 – 3	10	2014
Kajsa Rinaldo Persson	1 – 1	-	1 – 1	2	2017
Nadja Roma	3 – 5	1 – 1	2 – 4	7	2004
Sandra Roma	2 – 0	-	2 – 0	3	2009
Christina Sandberg	14 – 11	9 – 7	5 – 4	16	1966
Lena Sandin	4 – 3	3 – 3	1 – 0	6	1979
Ulla Sandulf	0 – 2	0 – 1	0 – 1	1	1964
Maria Strandlund	13 – 20	7 – 12	6 – 8	24	1988
Anna-Karin Svensson	6 – 4	4 – 4	2 – 0	8	1996
Åsa Svensson	23 – 19	15 – 15	8 – 4	25	1993
Kristina Triska	6 – 2	3 – 1	3 – 1	4	1998
Mimmi Wikstedt	11 – 10	1 – 2	10 – 8	18	1973
Maria Wolfbrandt	5 – 3	2 – 1	3 – 2	8	1999
