= Gaëlle Widmer =

Swiss tennis player

- Country (sports): Switzerland
- Born: 24 December 1977 (age 47); Sumiswald, Switzerland
- Retired: 2007
- Plays: Left-handed
- Prize money: $51,170

Singles
- Career record: 136–104
- Career titles: 5 ITF
- Highest ranking: No. 238 (14 May 2007)

Doubles
- Career record: 18–44
- Career titles: 0
- Highest ranking: No. 430 (6 August 2007)

Gaëlle Widmer (born 24 December 1977) is a Swiss former professional tennis player.

== Biography ==
Widmer, a left-handed player from Neuchâtel, reached a best ranking on tour of 238 in the world.

Her career included a Fed Cup appearance for Switzerland in 2005, when she and Stefanie Vögele were beaten by Austria's Klemenschits twins in a World Group Playoff doubles rubber.

She won a total of five ITF singles titles, before retiring in 2007.

== ITF Circuit finals ==
$25,000 tournaments
$10,000 tournaments

=== Singles: 10 (5 titles, 5 runner-ups) ===
Outcome	No.	Date	Tournament	Surface	Opponent	Score
Winner	1.	1 December 2003	ITF Cairo, Egypt	Clay	(Spain) Gabriela Velasco Andreu	6–4, 4–6, 6–2
Winner	2.	30 March 2004	ITF Cairo, Egypt	Clay	(Russia) Marina Shamayko	3–6, 6–4, 7–6^{(5)}
Runner-up	3.	15 August 2004	ITF Koksijde, Belgium	Clay	(Netherlands) Michaëlla Krajicek	4–6, 2–6
Runner-up	4.	22 August 2004	ITF Enschede, Netherlands	Clay	(Germany) Antonela Voina	5–7, 4–6
Runner-up	5.	29 August 2004	ITF Alphen a/d Rijn, Netherlands	Clay	(Netherlands) Tessy van de Ven	3–6, 3–6
Winner	6.	26 April 2005	ITF Bournemouth, United Kingdom	Clay	(United Kingdom) Georgie Gent	6–3, 6–2
Winner	7.	12 March 2006	ITF Sunderland, United Kingdom	Hard	(United Kingdom) Naomi Cavaday	6–1, 3–6, 6–1
Runner-up	8.	7 March 2007	ITF Jersey, United Kingdom	Hard	(United Kingdom) Jane O'Donoghue	6–4, 2–6, 4–6
Winner	9.	14 March 2007	ITF Sunderland, United Kingdom	Hard (i)	(United Kingdom) Anna Fitzpatrick	6–4, 6–1
Runner-up	10.	6 May 2007	ITF Antalya, Turkey	Hard	(Germany) Angelique Kerber	6–3, 4–6, 1–6

=== Doubles: 2 (2 runner-ups) ===
Outcome	No.	Date	Tournament	Surface	Partner	Opponents	Score
Runner-up	1.	19 September 2006	ITF Madrid, Spain	Hard	(France) Céline Cattaneo	(Romania) Sorana Cîrstea (United Kingdom) Katie O'Brien	4–6, 4–6
Runner-up	2.	7 March 2007	ITF Jersey, United Kingdom	Hard (i)	(France) Céline Cattaneo	(United Kingdom) Anna Hawkins (United Kingdom) Elizabeth Thomas	1–6, 3–6

== See also ==
- List of Switzerland Fed Cup team representatives
