= Mari Andersson =

Swedish tennis player (born 1986)

- Country (sports): Sweden
- Born: 5 July 1986 (age 39) Seoul, South Korea
- Height: 1.65 m (5 ft 5 in)
- Plays: Right (two-handed backhand)
- Prize money: $29,286

Singles
- Career record: 90–64
- Career titles: 5 ITF
- Highest ranking: No. 335 (7 May 2007)

Doubles
- Career record: 60–40
- Career titles: 9 ITF
- Highest ranking: No. 318 (14 May 2007)

Mari Andersson (born 5 July 1986) is a former professional tennis player from Sweden.

== Biography ==
Born in Seoul, South Korea, Andersson was adopted at three months of age by a Swedish couple and grew up in Båstad.

Andersson made her only WTA Tour main-draw appearance at the 2006 Nordea Nordic Light Open, where she featured in the women's doubles as a lucky loser from qualifying, partnering Nadja Roma.

From 2006 to 2007, she played in the doubles rubber of four Fed Cup ties for Sweden, winning all matches.

On the ITF circuit, she won a total of 14 titles, five in singles and nine in doubles.

Retiring from the tour in 2008, Andersson moved to the United States and played collegiate tennis for the California Golden Bears of UC Berkeley. She partnered with Jana Juricová to win the NCAA doubles championship in 2009.

== ITF finals ==
Legend
$25,000 tournaments
$10,000 tournaments

=== Singles: 5 (5–0) ===
Result	No.	Date	Tournament	Surface	Opponent	Score
Win	1.	26 June 2005	ITF Oslo, Norway	Clay	(Sweden) Johanna Larsson	6-4, 6-4
Win	2.	28 August 2005	ITF Maribor, Slovenia	Clay	(Bulgaria) Dia Evtimova	7-5, 6-3
Win	3.	14 May 2006	ITF Edinburgh, United Kingdom	Clay	(Belgium) Yanina Wickmayer	0-6, 6-1, 6-3
Win	4.	29 July 2006	ITF Gausdal, Norway	Hard	(Sweden) Nadja Roma	6–3, 6–7^{(4)}, 6–2
Win	5.	5 November 2006	ITF Stockholm, Sweden	Hard (i)	(Sweden) Michaela Johansson	3–6, 6–3, 6–2

=== Doubles: 11 (9–2) ===
Result	No.	Date	Tournament	Surface	Partner	Opponents	Score
Win	1.	24 April 2005	ITF Bol, Croatia	Clay	(Sweden) Kristina Andlovic	(Croatia) Sanja Ančić (Croatia) Ivana Lisjak	6–3, 6–2
Win	2.	14 May 2005	ITF Falkenberg, Sweden	Clay	(Sweden) Johanna Larsson	(Poland) Natalia Kołat (Poland) Monika Schneider	6–1, 6–1
Win	3.	28 August 2005	ITF Maribor, Slovenia	Clay	(Sweden) Kristina Andlovic	(Hungary) Katalin Marosi (Brazil) Marina Tavares	7-6, 6-3
Loss	4.	6 November 2005	ITF Stockholm, Sweden	Hard (i)	(Sweden) Johanna Larsson	(Austria) Eva-Maria Hoch (Germany) Martina Pavelec	4–6, 3–6
Win	5.	10 May 2006	ITF Edinburgh, United Kingdom	Clay	(Sweden) Nadja Roma	(United Kingdom) Deborah Armstrong (United Kingdom) Georgie Gent	6–2, 6–2
Win	6.	21 May 2006	ITF Falkenberg, Sweden	Clay	(Sweden) Michaela Johansson	(Germany) Anne Schäfer (Germany) Julia Paetow	6–2, 6–0
Win	7.	23 May 2006	ITF Balș, Romania	Clay	(Norway) Karoline Borgersen	(Romania) Raluca Ciulei (Romania) Lenore Lazaroiu	6–0, 6–1
Win	8.	28 July 2006	ITF Gausdal, Norway	Hard	(Sweden) Nadja Roma	(Norway) Karoline Borgersen (Sweden) Michaela Johansson	6–4, 6–0
Win	9.	5 May 2007	ITF Makarska, Croatia	Clay	(Sweden) Nadja Roma	(Poland) Magdalena Kiszczyńska (Russia) Anastasia Poltoratskaya	w/o
Win	10.	27 May 2007	ITF Falkenberg, Sweden	Clay	(Sweden) Nadja Roma	(Germany) Franziska Götz (Germany) Anne Schäfer	6–0, 7–5
Loss	11.	1 July 2007	ITF Oslo, Norway	Clay	(Norway) Karoline Steiro	(Austria) Eva-Maria Hoch (Austria) Melanie Klaffner	2–6, 3–6

== See also ==
- List of Sweden Fed Cup team representatives
