= Nadja Roma =

Swedish tennis player

- Country (sports): Sweden
- Born: 27 July 1988 (age 37) Stockholm, Sweden
- Plays: Left-handed
- Prize money: $21,629

Singles
- Career record: 56–50
- Career titles: 1 ITF
- Highest ranking: No. 399 (30 October 2006)

Doubles
- Career record: 47–29
- Career titles: 7 ITF
- Highest ranking: No. 352 (9 July 2007)

Team competitions
- Fed Cup: 3–5

Nadja Roma (born 27 July 1988) is a Swedish former professional tennis player.

== Biography ==
A left-handed player from Stockholm, Roma represented the Sweden Fed Cup team in a total of seven ties. She was used mostly as a doubles player but played twice in singles, which included a win over Ekaterina Dzehalevich of Belarus.

Roma competed mainly on the ITF Circuit and won one singles and seven doubles titles during her career. She featured as a wildcard in the main draw of the 2008 Abierto Mexicano, a WTA Tour tournament in Acapulco, where she was beaten in the first round by Iveta Benešová.

Her younger sister Sandra also played professional tennis.

== ITF finals ==
$25,000 tournaments
$10,000 tournaments

=== Singles: 4 (1–3) ===
Result	No.	Date	Tournament	Surface	Opponent	Score
Loss	1.	19 March 2006	ITF Sheffield, Great Britain	Hard (i)	(United Kingdom) Sarah Borwell	6–4, 1–6, 4–6
Loss	2.	29 July 2006	ITF Gausdal, Norway	Hard	(Sweden) Mari Andersson	3–6, 7–6^{(4)}, 2–6
Win	1.	26 August 2006	ITF Cumberland, Great Britain	Hard	(United Kingdom) Anna Fitzpatrick	6–3, 6–3
Loss	3.	4 November 2007	ITF Stockholm, Sweden	Hard (i)	(Sweden) Johanna Larsson	2–6, 1–6

=== Doubles: 11 (7–4) ===
Result	No.	Date	Tournament	Surface	Partner	Opponents	Score
Win	1.	25 June 2005	ITF Oslo, Norway	Clay	(Sweden) Johanna Larsson	(Sweden) Kristina Andlovic (Norway) Karoline Borgersen	6–4, 6–4
Loss	1.	16 October 2005	ITF Porto Santo, Portugal	Hard	(Sweden) Diana Eriksson	(Romania) Alexandra Orăşanu (Romania) Sorana Cîrstea	7–5, 5–7, 4–6
Loss	2.	11 March 2006	ITF Sunderland,, Great Britain	Hard (i)	(Finland) Piia Suomalainen	(Germany) Carmen Klaschka (Germany) Korina Perkovic	2–6, 3–6
Loss	3.	9 April 2006	ITF Makarska, Croatia	Clay	(Sweden) Johanna Larsson	(Romania) Raluca Olaru (Romania) Antonia Xenia Tout	4–6, 5–7
Win	2.	10 May 2006	ITF Edinburgh, Great Britain	Clay	(Sweden) Mari Andersson	(United Kingdom) Deborah Armstrong (United Kingdom) Georgie Gent	6–2, 6–2
Win	3.	28 July 2006	ITF Gausdal, Norway	Hard	(Sweden) Mari Andersson	(Norway) Karoline Borgersen (Sweden) Michaela Johansson	6–4, 6–0
Win	4.	3 September 2006	ITF Mollerussa, Spain	Hard	(Sweden) Michaela Johansson	(United Kingdom) Jane O'Donoghue (United Kingdom) Karen Paterson	6–3, 2–6, 6–3
Loss	4.	27 April 2007	ITF Bol, Croatia	Clay	(Romania) Mihaela Buzărnescu	(Czech Republic) Iveta Gerlová (Czech Republic) Lucie Kriegsmannová	3–6, 5–7
Win	5.	5 May 2007	ITF Makarska, Croatia	Clay	(Sweden) Mari Andersson	(Poland) Magdalena Kiszczyńska (Russia) Anastasia Poltoratskaya	w/o
Win	6.	27 May 2007	ITF Falkenberg, Sweden	Clay	(Sweden) Mari Andersson	(Germany) Franziska Götz (Germany) Anne Schäfer	6–0, 7–5
Win	7.	3 November 2007	ITF Stockholm, Sweden	Hard (i)	(Sweden) Johanna Larsson	(Sweden) Diana Eriksson (Denmark) Hanne-Skak Jensen	6–7^{(2)}, 6–3, [10–6]

== See also ==
- List of Sweden Fed Cup team representatives
