= Lizaan du Plessis =

South African tennis player

- Country (sports): South Africa
- Born: 23 February 1986 (age 39); Somerset East
- Turned pro: 2002
- Retired: 2009
- Plays: Left-handed (two-handed backhand)
- Prize money: $29,872

Singles
- Career record: 95–77
- Career titles: 1 ITF
- Highest ranking: No. 521 (14 April 2008)

Doubles
- Career record: 64–48
- Career titles: 6 ITF
- Highest ranking: No. 278 (14 September 2009)

Team competitions
- Fed Cup: 5–6
Medal record
Representing South Africa
Women's Tennis
African Games
Silver medal – second place	2007 Algiers	Singles
Silver medal – second place	2007 Algiers	Doubles
Silver medal – second place	2007 Algiers	Team

Lizaan du Plessis (born 23 February 1986) is a former professional tennis player from South Africa.

== Biography ==
Born in Somerset East on the Eastern Cape, du Plessis made her Fed Cup debut for South Africa in 2005 and went on to feature in a total of ten ties.

She won seven titles on the ITF Women's Circuit, one in singles and six in doubles.

At the 2007 All-Africa Games in Algiers, she won silver medals in both singles and doubles events.

== ITF finals ==
$25,000 tournaments
$10,000 tournaments

=== Singles: 5 (1–4) ===
Result	No.	Date	Tournament	Surface	Opponent	Score
Loss	1.	20 June 2004	Montemor-o-Novo, Portugal	Hard	(Portugal) Ana Catarina Nogueira	2–6, 3–6
Loss	2.	27 November 2004	Pretoria, South Africa	Hard	(South Africa) Chanelle Scheepers	1–6, 3–6
Loss	3.	5 November 2005	Pretoria, South Africa	Hard	(South Africa) Alicia Pillay	2–6, 2–6
Loss	4.	4 August 2007	Ilkley, United Kingdom	Grass	(Australia) Jessica Moore	4–6, 2–6
Win	1.	28 October 2007	Cape Town, South Africa	Hard	(South Africa) Chanel Simmonds	6–1, 6–0

=== Doubles: 11 (6–5) ===
Result	No.	Date	Tournament	Surface	Partner	Opponents	Score
Loss	1.	1 November 2003	Lagos, Nigeria	Hard	(Egypt) Noha Mohsen	(Egypt) Heidi El Tabakh (Egypt) Yomna Farid	1–6, 7–5, 1–6
Loss	2.	31 July 2004	Dublin, Ireland	Carpet	(United Kingdom) Rebecca Llewellyn	(Republic of Ireland) Yvonne Doyle (Republic of Ireland) Karen Nugent	4–6, 6–3, 2–6
Loss	3.	13 March 2005	Sunderland, United Kingdom	Hard (i)	(United Kingdom) Rebecca Llewellyn	(Austria) Verena Amesbauer (Czech Republic) Veronika Chvojková	3–6, 4–6
Win	1.	29 October 2005	Pretoria, South Africa	Hard	(South Africa) Alicia Pillay	(South Africa) Abigail Olivier (South Africa) Elze Potgieter	6–4, 6–3
Loss	4.	19 November 2005	Giza, Egypt	Clay	(Netherlands) Leonie Mekel	(Russia) Galina Fokina (Russia) Raissa Gourevitch	3–6, 1–6
Win	2.	3 August 2007	Ilkley, United Kingdom	Grass	(Belgium) Davinia Lobbinger	(United Kingdom) Julia Bone (United Kingdom) Olivia Scarfi	7–6^{(6)}, 6–1
Win	3.	31 August 2007	Mollerusa, Spain	Hard	(South Africa) Kelly Anderson	(Spain) Sabina Mediano-Álvarez (Spain) Francisca Sintès Martín	6–4, 7–6^{(3)}
Win	4.	7 October 2007	Les Franqueses del Vallès, Spain	Hard	(United States) Daisy Ames	(Estonia) Gajane Vage (Spain) Maribel Vicente Joyera	6–0, 6–2
Win	5.	27 October 2007	Cape Town, South Africa	Hard	(South Africa) Lisa Marshall	(South Africa) Tegan Edwards (Spain) Goele Lemmens	6–2, 6–3
Loss	5.	26 October 2008	Port Pirie, Australia	Hard	(Australia) Tiffany Welford	(United States) Robin Stephenson (South Africa) Natalie Grandin	2–6, 0–6
Win	6.	6 March 2009	Sydney, Australia	Hard	(Australia) Monique Adamczak	(China) Han Xinyun (China) Ji Chunmei	6–3, 7–5

== See also ==
- List of South Africa Fed Cup team representatives
