= Alicia Pillay =

South African tennis player

- Country (sports): South Africa
- Born: 24 March 1980 (age 45); Pietermaritzburg, South Africa
- Plays: Right-handed
- Prize money: $14,375

Singles
- Career titles: 2 ITF
- Highest ranking: No. 543 (8 May 2006)

Doubles
- Career titles: 1 ITF
- Highest ranking: No. 425 (13 December 1999)

Alicia Pillay (born 24 March 1980) is a South African former professional tennis player.

== Career ==
Born Pietermaritzburg, Pillay completed her schooling in the United States, attending Boca Preparatory School while she trained at the Evert Tennis Academy. She then played varsity tennis, first at Oklahoma Christian University, before transferring to the University of Tulsa.

Pillay, a right-handed player, represented South Africa at the 1999 All-Africa Games and won a gold medal in the team event. In both 2005 and 2006 she played for the South Africa Fed Cup team, featuring in a total of seven ties. Her Fed Cup career included singles matches against Caroline Wozniacki and Ana Ivanovic.

== ITF finals ==
=== Singles: 3 (2–1) ===
Result	No.	Date	Tournament	Surface	Opponent	Score
Win	1.	7 December 1998	Pretoria, South Africa	Hard	(Russia) Anna Eugenia Nefedova	6–1, 6–3
Loss	1.	24 October 2005	Pretoria 1, South Africa	Hard	(Mauritius) Marinne Giraud	4–6, 2–6
Win	2.	5 November 2005	Pretoria 2, South Africa	Hard	(South Africa) Lizaan du Plessis	6–2, 6–2

=== Doubles: 6 (1–5) ===
Result	No.	Date	Tournament	Surface	Partner	Opponents	Score
Loss	1.	22 December 1996	Cape Town, South Africa	Hard	(South Africa) Natalie Grandin	(Denmark) Charlotte Aagaard (Denmark) Maiken Pape	7–5, 2–6, 3–6
Loss	2.	7 December 1998	Pretoria, South Africa	Hard	(Poland) Karolina Sadaj	(South Africa) Lincky Ackron (South Africa) Karyn Bacon	3–6, 0–6
Loss	3.	7 March 1999	Wodonga, Australia	Grass	(South Africa) Natalie Grandin	(Australia) Kerry-Anne Guse (Australia) Trudi Musgrave	3–6, 2–6
Loss	4.	8 September 2004	Ciudad Victoria, Mexico	Hard	(Poland) Katarzyna Siwosz	(United States) Tamara Encina (United States) Alison Ojeda	4–6, 6–3, 1–6
Win	1.	29 October 2005	Pretoria, South Africa	Hard	(South Africa) Lizaan du Plessis	(South Africa) Abigail Olivier (South Africa) Elze Potgieter	6–4, 6–3
Loss	5.	31 October 2005	Pretoria, South Africa	Hard	(Germany) Dalia-Diana Vranceanu	(South Africa) Annali De Bruyn (Germany) Julia Paetow	5–7, 6–1, 6–7^{(2)}

== See also ==
- List of South Africa Fed Cup team representatives
