= 2007 ITF Women's Circuit =

Women's tennis tournament series

Details

Achievements (singles)

The ITF Women's Circuit is the second-tier tour for women's professional tennis organised by the International Tennis Federation, and is the tier below the WTA Tour. In 2007, the ITF Women's Circuit included tournaments with prize money ranging from $10,000 to $100,000.

The ITF world champions in 2007 were Justine Henin (senior singles), Cara Black / Liezel Huber (senior doubles) and Urszula Radwańska (combined junior ranking).

== Tournament breakdown by event category ==
Event category	Number of events	Total prize money
$100,000	7	$700,000
$75,000	17	$1,275,000
$50,000	38	$1,900,000
$25,000	138	$3,450,000
$10,000	217	$2,170,000
Total	417	$9,495,000

== Tournament breakdown by region ==
Region	Number of events	Total prize money
Africa	13	$160,000
Asia	53	$1,310,000
Central America/Caribbean	21	$315,000
Europe	249	$5,480,000
North America	46	$1,715,000
Oceania	11	$245,000
South America	24	$270,000
Total	417	$9,495,000

== Singles titles by nation ==
Rank	Nation	Titles won
1.	Russia	28
2.	Argentina	24
3.	Italy	23
4.	United States	21
5.	France	20
6.	Czech Republic	18
7.	Spain	17
=	Germany	17
=	Romania	17
10.	Japan	14
=	Netherlands	14
12.	Poland	13
13.	Serbia	11
14.	(Slovakia) Slovak Republic	10
15.	Belarus	9
=	Brazil	9
=	China	9
18.	Australia	8
=	Slovenia	8
=	Switzerland	8
=	Ukraine	8

This list displays only the top 21 nations in terms of singles titles wins.

== Sources ==
- List of ITF World Champions
- 2007 ITF statistics summary
- 2007 ITF pro circuit singles titles won by nation
