= 2006 ITF Women's Circuit =

Tennis circuit

Details

Achievements (singles)

The ITF Women's Circuit is the second-tier tour for women's professional tennis organised by the International Tennis Federation, and is the tier below the WTA Tour. In 2006, the ITF Women's Circuit included tournaments with prize money ranging from $10,000 to $75,000.

The ITF world champions in 2006 were Justine Henin (senior singles), Lisa Raymond / Samantha Stosur (senior doubles) and Anastasia Pavlyuchenkova (combined junior ranking).

== Tournament breakdown by event category ==
Event category	Number of events	Total prize money
$75,000	18	$1,350,000
$50,000	37	$1,850,000
$25,000	125	$3,125,000
$10,000	228	$2,280,000
Total	408	$8,605,000

== Tournament breakdown by region ==
Region	Number of events	Total prize money
Africa	12	$150,000
Asia	63	$1,445,000
Central America/Caribbean	22	$370,000
Europe	232	$4,440,000
North America	47	$1,715,000
Oceania	13	$265,000
South America	19	$220,000
Total	408	$8,605,000

== Singles titles by nation ==
Rank	Nation	Titles won
1.	United States	29
2.	Russia	26
3.	Germany	25
4.	France	23
4.	Romania Romania	23
6.	Italy	19
7.	Argentina	18
8.	Ukraine	16
9.	China	13
10.	Spain	13
10.	Japan	13
12.	Czech Republic	12
13.	United Kingdom	11
14.	Netherlands	10
15.	Hungary	9
16.	Brazil	8
17.	Croatia	8
17.	Serbia	8
19.	Slovakia	7
19.	Chinese Taipei	7

This list displays only the top 20 nations in terms of singles titles wins.

== Sources ==
- List of ITF World Champions
- 2006 ITF statistics summary
- ITF pro circuit titles won by nations players in 2006
