= 2008 Nordea Danish Open – Singles =

Singles
- 2008 Nordea Danish Open

Final
- Champion: (Denmark) Caroline Wozniacki
- Runner-up: (Sweden) Sofia Arvidsson
- Score: 6–2, 6–1

Events
Singles	Doubles
- Nordea Danish Open

This was the first edition of the tournament.

Caroline Wozniacki won in the final, defeating Sofia Arvidsson 6–2, 6–1.

== Seeds ==
1. (Denmark) Caroline Wozniacki (champion)
2. (Sweden) Sofia Arvidsson (final)
3. (Italy) Maria Elena Camerin (quarterfinals)
4. (Germany) Angelique Kerber (semifinals)
5. (Russia) Ekaterina Bychkova (first round)
6. (France) Stéphanie Foretz (semifinals)
7. (Czech Republic) Lucie Hradecká (quarterfinals)
8. (Switzerland) Stefanie Vögele (second round)

== Draw ==
Key

- Q = Qualifier
- WC = Wild card
- LL = Lucky loser
- Alt = Alternate
- ITF = ITF entry
- PR = Protected ranking
- SR = Special ranking
- SE = Special exempt
- JE = Junior exempt
- JR = Junior Accelerator Programme entrant
- CO = College Accelerator Programme entrant
- NG = Next Gen Accelerator Program entrant
- w/o = Walkover
- r = Retired
- d = Defaulted

=== Finals ===
Semifinals
1	(Denmark) Caroline Wozniacki	7	7
6	(France) Stéphanie Foretz	6^{2}	5
4	(Germany) Angelique Kerber	6^{4}	2
2	(Sweden) Sofia Arvidsson	7	6

Final
1	(Denmark) Caroline Wozniacki	6	6
2	(Sweden) Sofia Arvidsson	2	1

=== Top half ===
First round
1	(Denmark) C Wozniacki	6	6
LL	(Bulgaria) D Evtimova	2	2
WC	(Denmark) HS Jensen	7	6
WC	(Denmark) K Barbat	5	1
(Czech Republic) V Chvojková	3	1
(Germany) J Schruff	6	6
(Sweden) J Larsson	2	4
8	(Switzerland) S Vögele	6	6
3	(Italy) ME Camerin	6	6
(Germany) M Müller	0	1
(Russia) V Manasieva	7	6
(Italy) C Dentoni	5	2
WC	(Finland) E Laine	3	3
(Slovenia) A Klepač	6	6
Q	(Slovakia) L Juríková	2	4
6	(France) S Foretz	6	6

Second round
1	(Denmark) C Wozniacki	6	6
WC	(Denmark) HS Jensen	2	1
(Germany) J Schruff	6	6
8	(Switzerland) S Vögele	3	3
3	(Italy) ME Camerin	6	6
(Russia) V Manasieva	4	1
(Slovenia) A Klepač	3	3
6	(France) S Foretz	6	6

Quarter Finals
1	(Denmark) C Wozniacki	6	6
(Germany) J Schruff	3	2
3	(Italy) ME Camerin	0	5
6	(France) S Foretz	6	7

Semi Final
1	(Denmark) C Wozniacki	7	7
6	(France) S Foretz	6^{2}	5

=== Bottom half ===
First round
7	(Czech Republic) L Hradecká	6	4	6
(United Kingdom) E Baltacha	3	6	4
(Czech Republic) N Fraňková	6	6
(Bosnia and Herzegovina) M Jugić-Salkić	3	3
WC	(Denmark) M Ejdesgaard	2	3
LL	(Croatia) J Tinjić	6	6
Q	(United Kingdom) S Borwell	6^{7}	4
4	(Germany) A Kerber	7	6
5	(Russia) E Bychkova	7	5	6^{6}
(Russia) A Panova	6^{2}	7	7
Q	(Germany) T Malek	6	6
LL	(Netherlands) P Wong	3	0
LL	(United Kingdom) A Smith	4	1
Q	(Netherlands) M Krajicek	6	6
PR	(Germany) A Petkovic	6	3	1
2	(Sweden) S Arvidsson	3	6	6

Second round
7	(Czech Republic) L Hradecká	6^{1}	6	6
(Czech Republic) N Fraňková	7	4	1
LL	(Croatia) J Tinjić	1	6^{2}
4	(Germany) A Kerber	6	7
(Russia) A Panova	4	6^{7}
Q	(Germany) T Malek	6	7
Q	(Netherlands) M Krajicek	6	6^{2}	3
2	(Sweden) S Arvidsson	1	7	6

Quarter Finals
7	(Czech Republic) L Hradecká	6	3	6^{4}
4	(Germany) A Kerber	3	6	7
Q	(Germany) T Malek	0	2
2	(Sweden) S Arvidsson	6	6

Semi Final
4	(Germany) A Kerber	6^{4}	2
2	(Sweden) S Arvidsson	7	6

== Qualifying ==
=== Seeds ===
1. (Netherlands) Michaëlla Krajicek (qualified)
2. (Germany) Tatjana Malek (qualified)
3. (Slovakia) Lenka Juríková (qualified)
4. (United Kingdom) Sarah Borwell (qualified)
5. (United Kingdom) Anna Smith (qualifying competition, lucky loser)
6. (Netherlands) Pauline Wong (qualifying competition, lucky loser)
7. (Bulgaria) Dia Evtimova (qualifying competition, lucky loser)
8. (Romania) Diana Enache (first round)

=== Qualifiers ===
1. (Netherlands) Michaëlla Krajicek
2. (Germany) Tatjana Malek
3. (Slovakia) Lenka Juríková
4. (United Kingdom) Sarah Borwell

=== Lucky losers ===
1. (Croatia) Jasmina Tinjić
2. (Netherlands) Pauline Wong
3. (United Kingdom) Anna Smith
4. (Bulgaria) Dia Evtimova

=== Qualifying draw ===
==== First qualifier ====
First round
1	(Netherlands) Michaëlla Krajicek	6	6
(Russia) Alexandra Romanova	1	1
(Denmark) Isabella Garde Schreiner	4	3
(Argentina) Erica Krauth	6	6
(Croatia) Jasmina Tinjić	6	6
(Germany) Natalie Pröse	1	1
(Norway) Ulrikke Eikeri	6	2	6
8	(Romania) Diana Enache	0	6	3

Second round
1	(Netherlands) Michaëlla Krajicek	6	6
(Argentina) Erica Krauth	1	1
(Croatia) Jasmina Tinjić	6	6
(Norway) Ulrikke Eikeri	4	1

Qualifying competition
1	(Netherlands) Michaëlla Krajicek	6	6
(Croatia) Jasmina Tinjić	1	3

==== Second qualifier ====
First round
2	(Germany) Tatjana Malek	6	6
(Norway) Helene Auensen	3	2
(Denmark) Maria Christensen	6	1	2
WC	(Denmark) Maria Jespersen	3	6	6
(Germany) Julia Paetow	3	4
(United Kingdom) Lucy Warburton	6	6
(Russia) Alina Tseplukhova	0	2
6	(Netherlands) Pauline Wong	6	6

Second round
2	(Germany) Tatjana Malek	6	6
WC	(Denmark) Maria Jespersen	1	0
(United Kingdom) Lucy Warburton	1	0
6	(Netherlands) Pauline Wong	6	6

Qualifying competition
2	(Germany) Tatjana Malek	6	7
6	(Netherlands) Pauline Wong	3	6^{1}

==== Third qualifier ====
First round
3	(Slovakia) Lenka Juríková	6	6
WC	(Denmark) Emma Henriksen	1	0
(Norway) Thale Myhre	6	7
(Sweden) Adla Mahić	2	6^{5}
(Sweden) Hanna Nooni	6^{3}	6	3
(Spain) Irene Santos Bravo	7	3	6
(Denmark) Mai Grage	5	1
5	(United Kingdom) Anna Smith	7	6

Second round
3	(Slovakia) Lenka Juríková	6	6
(Norway) Thale Myhre	1	2
(Spain) Irene Santos Bravo	3	1
5	(United Kingdom) Anna Smith	6	6

Qualifying competition
3	(Slovakia) Lenka Juríková	6	6
5	(United Kingdom) Anna Smith	1	4

==== Fourth qualifier ====
First round
4	(United Kingdom) Sarah Borwell	6	6
(United States) Courtney Nagle	2	3
WC	(Denmark) Trine Bassett	w/o
WC	(Sweden) Sandra Roma
(Sweden) Ellen Allgurin	2	1
(France) Charlène Vanneste	6	6
WC	(Denmark) Victoria Rode-Bager	1	1
7	(Bulgaria) Dia Evtimova	6	6

Second round
4	(United Kingdom) Sarah Borwell	6	4	6
WC	(Denmark) Trine Bassett	2	6	3
(France) Charlène Vanneste	4	2^{r}
7	(Bulgaria) Dia Evtimova	6	3

Qualifying competition
4	(United Kingdom) Sarah Borwell	6	6
7	(Bulgaria) Dia Evtimova	0	2
