= 2010 e-Boks Danish Open – Doubles =

Doubles
- 2010 e-Boks Danish Open

Final
- Champion: (Germany) Julia Görges (Germany) Anna-Lena Grönefeld
- Runner-up: (Russia) Vitalia Diatchenko (Belarus) Tatiana Poutchek
- Score: 6–4, 6–4

Details
- Draw: 16
- Seeds: 4

Events
Singles	Doubles
- e-Boks Danish Open

1st-seeded German pair Julia Görges and Anna-Lena Grönefeld won in the final 6–4, 6–4, against Vitalia Diatchenko and Tatiana Poutchek.

== Seeds ==
1. (Germany) Julia Görges / (Germany) Anna-Lena Grönefeld (champions)
2. (Zimbabwe) Cara Black / (New Zealand) Marina Erakovic (first round)
3. (Turkey) İpek Şenoğlu / (Czech Republic) Renata Voráčová (semifinals)
4. (Russia) Vitalia Diatchenko / (Belarus) Tatiana Poutchek (final)

== Draw ==
Key

- Q = Qualifier
- WC = Wild card
- LL = Lucky loser
- Alt = Alternate
- ITF = ITF entry
- PR = Protected ranking
- SR = Special ranking
- SE = Special exempt
- JE = Junior exempt
- JR = Junior Accelerator Programme entrant
- CO = College Accelerator Programme entrant
- NG = Next Gen Accelerator Program entrant
- w/o = Walkover
- r = Retired
- d = Defaulted

=== Draw ===
First round
1	(Germany) J Görges (Germany) A-L Grönefeld	6	6
(Austria) S Klemenschits (Slovenia) A Klepač	2	2
(Russia) M Kondratieva (France) S Lefèvre	6	6
WC	(Denmark) K Barbat (Denmark) M Grage	0	4
3	(Turkey) İ Şenoğlu (Czech Republic) R Voráčová	6	4	[10]
(Sweden) S Arvidsson (Sweden) J Larsson	4	6	[7]
(Slovenia) P Hercog (Croatia) P Martić	6	4	[4]
(Finland) E Laine (France) I Pavlovic	3	6	[10]
(France) S Foretz (Tunisia) S Sfar	6	5	[8]
(Germany) K Barrois (Germany) T Malek	2	7	[10]
(Greece) E Daniilidou (Germany) J Wöhr	6^{2}	2
4	(Russia) V Diatchenko (Belarus) T Poutchek	7	6
WC	(Denmark) M Ejdesgaard (Denmark) C Wozniacki	6	6
(Austria) Y Meusburger (Switzerland) S Vögele	1	4
(United Kingdom) A Keothavong (United Kingdom) A Smith	6	7
2	(Zimbabwe) C Black (New Zealand) M Erakovic	4	5

Quarterfinals
1	(Germany) J Görges (Germany) A-L Grönefeld	6	6
(Russia) M Kondratieva (France) S Lefèvre	2	2
3	(Turkey) İ Şenoğlu (Czech Republic) R Voráčová	6	6
(Finland) E Laine (France) I Pavlovic	1	2
(Germany) K Barrois (Germany) T Malek	2	6^{6}
4	(Russia) V Diatchenko (Belarus) T Poutchek	6	7
WC	(Denmark) M Ejdesgaard (Denmark) C Wozniacki	5	3
(United Kingdom) A Keothavong (United Kingdom) A Smith	7	6

Semifinals
1	(Germany) J Görges (Germany) A-L Grönefeld	6	6
3	(Turkey) İ Şenoğlu (Czech Republic) R Voráčová	2	2
4	(Russia) V Diatchenko (Belarus) T Poutchek	6	6^{0}	[10]
(United Kingdom) A Keothavong (United Kingdom) A Smith	4	7	[5]

Finals
1	(Germany) J Görges (Germany) A-L Grönefeld	6	6
4	(Russia) V Diatchenko (Belarus) T Poutchek	4	4
