= 2008 Nordea Danish Open – Doubles =

Doubles
- 2008 Nordea Danish Open

Final
- Champions: (United Kingdom) Sarah Borwell (United States) Courtney Nagle
- Runners-up: (Czech Republic) Gabriela Chmelinová (Bosnia and Herzegovina) Mervana Jugić-Salkić
- Score: 6–4, 6–4

Events
Singles	Doubles
- Nordea Danish Open

This was the first edition of the tournament.

Sarah Borwell and Courtney Nagle won in the final, defeating Gabriela Chmelinová and Mervana Jugić-Salkić 6–4, 6–4.

== Seeds ==
1. (Czech Republic) Gabriela Chmelinová / (Bosnia and Herzegovina) Mervana Jugić-Salkić (final)
2. (Slovenia) Andreja Klepač / (Germany) Martina Müller (quarterfinals, withdrew)
3. (United Kingdom) Sarah Borwell / (United States) Courtney Nagle (champions)
4. (Czech Republic) Nikola Fraňková / (United Kingdom) Anna Smith (first round)

== Draw ==
Key

- Q = Qualifier
- WC = Wild card
- LL = Lucky loser
- Alt = Alternate
- ITF = ITF entry
- PR = Protected ranking
- SR = Special ranking
- SE = Special exempt
- JE = Junior exempt
- JR = Junior Accelerator Programme entrant
- CO = College Accelerator Programme entrant
- NG = Next Gen Accelerator Program entrant
- w/o = Walkover
- r = Retired
- d = Defaulted

=== Draw ===
First round
1	(Czech Republic) G Chmelinová (Bosnia and Herzegovina) M Jugić-Salkić	6	6
(Denmark) K Barbat (Croatia) J Tinjić	1	1
(Denmark) E Dyrberg (Denmark) HS Jensen	1	r
(Germany) A Petkovic (Germany) J Schruff	2
4	(Czech Republic) N Fraňková (United Kingdom) A Smith	6^{7}	4
(Russia) E Bychkova (Russia) V Manasieva	7	6
WC	(Denmark) M Ejdesgaard (Denmark) C Wozniacki	2	5
(Russia) A Panova (Switzerland) S Vögele	6	7
(Germany) A Kerber (Germany) T Malek	6	6
WC	(Denmark) T Bassett (Denmark) K-I Jacobsgaard	1	1
(Sweden) E Allgurin (Germany) N Pröse	2	2
3	(United Kingdom) S Borwell (United States) C Nagle	6	6
(Argentina) E Krauth (Sweden) H Nooni	6	4	[10]
(Czech Republic) V Chvojková (Finland) E Laine	4	6	[8]
(Denmark) M Grage (Norway) T Myhre	0	2
2	(Slovenia) A Klepač (Germany) M Müller	6	6

Quarterfinals
1	(Czech Republic) G Chmelinová (Bosnia and Herzegovina) M Jugić-Salkić	2	7	[10]
(Germany) A Petkovic (Germany) J Schruff	6	6^{5}	[8]
(Russia) E Bychkova (Russia) V Manasieva	7	3	[7]
(Russia) A Panova (Switzerland) S Vögele	5	6	[10]
(Germany) A Kerber (Germany) T Malek	2	6^{3}
3	(United Kingdom) S Borwell (United States) C Nagle	6	7
(Argentina) E Krauth (Sweden) H Nooni	w/o
2	(Slovenia) A Klepač (Germany) M Müller

Semifinals
1	(Czech Republic) G Chmelinová (Bosnia and Herzegovina) M Jugić-Salkić	3	6	[10]
(Russia) A Panova (Switzerland) S Vögele	6	4	[6]
3	(United Kingdom) S Borwell (United States) C Nagle	6	3	[10]
(Argentina) E Krauth (Sweden) H Nooni	2	6	[8]

Finals
1	(Czech Republic) G Chmelinová (Bosnia and Herzegovina) M Jugić-Salkić	4	4
3	(United Kingdom) S Borwell (United States) C Nagle	6	6
