= 2008 Nordea Danish Open =

- Date: 17–23 November
- Edition: 1st

Champions

Singles
- (Denmark) Caroline Wozniacki

Doubles
- (United Kingdom) Sarah Borwell / (United States) Courtney Nagle
Danish Open	· 2010 →

The 2008 Nordea Danish Open was a women's professional tennis event on the 2008 ITF Women's Circuit, which took place from 17 to 23 November. The event was hosted in Odense, Denmark. It was played on indoor carpet courts. The total prize money offered at this tournament was US$100,000.

The tournament was only played in 2008. The WTA tournament 2010 e-Boks Danish Open in Copenhagen may be viewed as a continuation.

== Entrants ==
=== Seeds ===
Player	Nationality	Ranking*	Seeding
Caroline Wozniacki	Denmark	12	1
Sofia Arvidsson	Sweden	64	2
Maria Elena Camerin	Italy	106	3
Angelique Kerber	Germany	107	4
Ekaterina Bychkova	Russia	112	5
Stéphanie Foretz	France	116	6
Lucie Hradecká	Czech Republic	119	7
Stefanie Vögele	Switzerland	132	8

- Rankings are as of November 11, 2008

=== Other entrants ===
The following players received wildcards into the main draw:

- (Denmark) Karen Barbat
- (Denmark) Malou Ejdesgaard
- (Denmark) Hanne Skak Jensen
- (Finland) Emma Laine

The following players received entry from the qualifying draw:

- (United Kingdom) Sarah Borwell
- (Slovakia) Lenka Juríková
- (Netherlands) Michaëlla Krajicek
- (Germany) Tatjana Malek

The following players received entry through the lucky loser spot:

- (Bulgaria) Dia Evtimova
- (United Kingdom) Anna Smith
- (Croatia) Jasmina Tinjić
- (Netherlands) Pauline Wong

The following players entered via a protected ranking:

- (Germany) Andrea Petkovic

== Champions ==
=== Singles ===
- (Denmark) Caroline Wozniacki def. (Sweden) Sofia Arvidsson, 6–2, 6–1

=== Doubles ===
- (United Kingdom) Sarah Borwell / (United States) Courtney Nagle def. (Czech Republic) Gabriela Chmelinová / (Bosnia and Herzegovina) Mervana Jugić-Salkić, 6–4, 6–4
