= 2011 e-Boks Sony Ericsson Open – Singles =

Singles
- 2011 e-Boks Sony Ericsson Open

Final
- Champion: (Denmark) Caroline Wozniacki
- Runner-up: (Czech Republic) Lucie Šafářová
- Score: 6–1, 6–4

Details
- Draw: 32
- Seeds: 8

Events
Singles	Doubles
- Danish Open

World No. 1 Caroline Wozniacki was the defending champion and successfully defended the title beating Lucie Šafářová in the final, 6–1, 6–4.

== Seeds ==
1. (Denmark) Caroline Wozniacki (champion)
2. (Czech Republic) Klára Zakopalová (first round)
3. (United States) Bethanie Mattek-Sands (quarterfinals)
4. (Czech Republic) Lucie Šafářová (final)
5. (Czech Republic) Barbora Záhlavová-Strýcová (second round)
6. (Latvia) Anastasija Sevastova (first round)
7. (Australia) Jelena Dokić (first round)
8. (Italy) Alberta Brianti (quarterfinals)

== Main draw ==
Key

- Q = Qualifier
- WC = Wild card
- LL = Lucky loser
- Alt = Alternate
- ITF = ITF entry
- PR = Protected ranking
- SR = Special ranking
- SE = Special exempt
- JE = Junior exempt
- JR = Junior Accelerator Programme entrant
- CO = College Accelerator Programme entrant
- NG = Next Gen Accelerator Program entrant
- w/o = Walkover
- r = Retired
- d = Defaulted

=== Finals ===
Semifinals
1	(Denmark) Caroline Wozniacki	6	6
Q	(Germany) Mona Barthel	1	2
4	(Czech Republic) Lucie Šafářová	1	6	6
(Croatia) Petra Martić	6	4	2

Final
1	(Denmark) Caroline Wozniacki	6	6
4	(Czech Republic) Lucie Šafářová	1	4

=== Top half ===
First round
1	(Denmark) C Wozniacki	6	6
(United States) I Falconi	2	3
(Germany) A Kerber	6	6
WC	(Czech Republic) K Plíšková	2	2
(Japan) K Nara	1	2
(Slovakia) Z Kučová	6	6
(Russia) A Panova	7^{7}	1	5
8	(Italy) A Brianti	6^{5}	6	7
3	(United States) B Mattek-Sands	6	6
WC	(Denmark) M Ejdesgaard	4	0
(Russia) V Dolonts	3	3
(Sweden) J Larsson	6	6
Q	(United States) A Glatch	2	5
Q	(Germany) M Barthel	6	7
(Sweden) S Arvidsson	2	1
5	(Czech Republic) B Záhlavová-Strýcová	6	6

Second round
1	(Denmark) C Wozniacki	7^{7}	6
(Germany) A Kerber	6^{4}	3
(Slovakia) Z Kučová	6	4	1
8	(Italy) A Brianti	3	6	6
3	(United States) B Mattek-Sands	6^{1}	6	7^{7}
(Sweden) J Larsson	7^{7}	0	6^{5}
Q	(Germany) M Barthel	7^{7}	6
5	(Czech Republic) B Záhlavová-Strýcová	6^{2}	4

Quarterfinals
1	(Denmark) C Wozniacki	6	6
8	(Italy) A Brianti	0	1
3	(United States) B Mattek-Sands	6	3	4
Q	(Germany) M Barthel	1	6	6

Semifinals
1	(Denmark) C Wozniacki	6	6
Q	(Germany) M Barthel	1	2

=== Bottom half ===
First round
7	(Australia) J Dokić	3	1
Q	(Kazakhstan) G Voskoboeva	6	6
(China) S Zhang	6	6
WC	(United States) J Boserup	2	2
(United States) M Oudin	1	5
(Netherlands) M Krajicek	6	7
Q	(Australia) J Konta	6	5	3
4	(Czech Republic) L Šafářová	4	7	6
6	(Latvia) A Sevastova	7^{7}	6^{4}	0
(Romania) S Halep	6^{5}	7^{7}	6
(Croatia) P Martić	6	6
(Russia) V Diatchenko	2	2
(Ukraine) O Savchuk	4	3
(Ukraine) A Bondarenko	6	6
(Germany) K Wörle	6	6
2	(Czech Republic) K Zakopalová	3	2

Second round
Q	(Kazakhstan) G Voskoboeva	3	6	3
(China) S Zhang	6	2	6
(Netherlands) M Krajicek	7^{7}	4	2
4	(Czech Republic) L Šafářová	6^{4}	6	6
(Romania) S Halep	3	7	5
(Croatia) P Martić	6	5	7
(Ukraine) A Bondarenko	6	1	6
(Germany) K Wörle	0	6	2

Quarterfinals
(China) S Zhang	6	0	6^{5}
4	(Czech Republic) L Šafářová	4	6	7^{7}
(Croatia) P Martić	6	4	6
(Ukraine) A Bondarenko	4	6	3

Semifinals
4	(Czech Republic) L Šafářová	1	6	6
(Croatia) P Martić	6	4	2
