= 2010 e-Boks Danish Open – Singles =

Singles
- 2010 e-Boks Danish Open

Final
- Champion: (Denmark) Caroline Wozniacki
- Runner-up: (Czech Republic) Klára Zakopalová
- Score: 6–2, 7–6^{(7–5)}

Details
- Draw: 32
- Seeds: 8

Events
Singles	Doubles
- e-Boks Danish Open

The first seed and home favourite Caroline Wozniacki defeated Klára Zakopalová 6–2, 7–6^{(7–5)} in the final.

== Seeds ==
1. (Denmark) Caroline Wozniacki (champion)
2. (China) Li Na (semifinals)
3. (Czech Republic) Petra Kvitová (first round)
4. (Bulgaria) Tsvetana Pironkova (first round)
5. (Germany) Julia Görges (quarterfinals)
6. (Slovenia) Polona Hercog (quarterfinals)
7. (Czech Republic) Klára Zakopalová (final)
8. (Germany) Angelique Kerber (quarterfinals)

== Main draw ==
Key

- Q = Qualifier
- WC = Wild card
- LL = Lucky loser
- Alt = Alternate
- ITF = ITF entry
- PR = Protected ranking
- SR = Special ranking
- SE = Special exempt
- JE = Junior exempt
- JR = Junior Accelerator Programme entrant
- CO = College Accelerator Programme entrant
- NG = Next Gen Accelerator Program entrant
- w/o = Walkover
- r = Retired
- d = Defaulted

=== Finals ===
Semifinals
1	(Denmark) Caroline Wozniacki	6	2	6
Q	(Russia) Anna Chakvetadze	1	6	4
7	(Czech Republic) Klára Zakopalová	6	1	6
2	(China) Li Na	3	6	4

Final
1	(Denmark) Caroline Wozniacki	6	7
7	(Czech Republic) Klára Zakopalová	2	6^{5}

=== Top half ===
First round
1	(Denmark) C Wozniacki	6	6
(Croatia) P Martić	3	2
LL	(Russia) E Bovina	4	0
(Czech Republic) I Benešová	6	6
(Austria) Y Meusburger	5	2
(Germany) K Barrois	7	6
(Switzerland) S Vögele	2	4
5	(Germany) J Görges	6	6
4	(Bulgaria) T Pironkova	4	1
(Russia) A Lapushchenkova	6	6
Q	(Russia) A Chakvetadze	6	7
(Sweden) J Larsson	4	6^{2}
(United Kingdom) A Keothavong	1	6	6
(Sweden) S Arvidsson	6	4	3
Q	(Germany) A-L Grönefeld	3	5
6	(Slovenia) P Hercog	6	7

Second round
1	(Denmark) C Wozniacki	4	6	6
(Czech Republic) I Benešová	6	2	0
(Germany) K Barrois	3	2
5	(Germany) J Görges	6	6
(Russia) A Lapushchenkova	3	4
Q	(Russia) A Chakvetadze	6	6
(United Kingdom) A Keothavong	6	0	4
6	(Slovenia) P Hercog	4	6	6

Quarterfinals
1	(Denmark) C Wozniacki	3	6	7
5	(Germany) J Görges	6	0	6^{3}
Q	(Russia) A Chakvetadze	6	6
6	(Slovenia) P Hercog	4	3

Semifinals
1	(Denmark) C Wozniacki	6	2	6
Q	(Russia) A Chakvetadze	1	6	4

=== Bottom half ===
First round
7	(Czech Republic) K Zakopalová	6	6^{6}	6
(Paraguay) R de los Ríos	3	7	0
WC	(Denmark) M Ejdesgaard	0	1
(Germany) T Malek	6	6
Q	(United States) A Glatch	2	6	1
WC	(Slovenia) K Srebotnik	6	4	6
(Romania) S Cîrstea	4	6	6
3	(Czech Republic) P Kvitová	6	2	4
8	(Germany) A Kerber	6	6
(Czech Republic) R Voráčová	1	1
(Czech Republic) S Záhlavová	6	6
Q	(Poland) M Domachowska	1	2
(New Zealand) M Erakovic	6	3	1
(United Kingdom) E Baltacha	3	6	6
WC	(Czech Republic) K Plíšková	6^{5}	3
2	(China) N Li	7	6

Second round
7	(Czech Republic) K Zakopalová	6	6
(Germany) T Malek	0	3
WC	(Slovenia) K Srebotnik	5	6	2
(Romania) S Cîrstea	7	4	6
8	(Germany) A Kerber	6	6
(Czech Republic) S Záhlavová	4	2
(United Kingdom) E Baltacha	3	2
2	(China) N Li	6	6

Quarterfinals
7	(Czech Republic) K Zakopalová	6	7
(Romania) S Cîrstea	1	5
8	(Germany) A Kerber	1	2
2	(China) N Li	6	6

Semifinals
7	(Czech Republic) K Zakopalová	6	1	6
2	(China) N Li	3	6	4
