= 2011 e-Boks Sony Ericsson Open – Doubles =

Doubles
- 2011 e-Boks Sony Ericsson Open

Final
- Champions: (Sweden) Johanna Larsson (Germany) Jasmin Wöhr
- Runners-up: (France) Kristina Mladenovic (Poland) Katarzyna Piter
- Score: 6–3, 6–3

Details
- Draw: 16
- Seeds: 4

Events
Singles	Doubles
- Danish Open

Julia Görges and Anna-Lena Grönefeld were the defending champions, but decided not to compete.
Johanna Larsson and Jasmin Wöhr won the tournament, defeating Kristina Mladenovic and Katarzyna Piter in the final 6–3, 6–3.

== Seeds ==
1. (United States) Bethanie Mattek-Sands / (United States) Melanie Oudin (second round, retired due to Mattek-Sands' low back injury)
2. (Sweden) Johanna Larsson / (Germany) Jasmin Wöhr (champions)
3. (Russia) Vitalia Diatchenko / (Ukraine) Mariya Koryttseva (first round, withdrew due to Diatchenko's right ankle injury)
4. (Italy) Alberta Brianti / (Croatia) Petra Martić (first round)

== Draw ==
Key

- Q = Qualifier
- WC = Wild card
- LL = Lucky loser
- Alt = Alternate
- ITF = ITF entry
- PR = Protected ranking
- SR = Special ranking
- SE = Special exempt
- JE = Junior exempt
- JR = Junior Accelerator Programme entrant
- CO = College Accelerator Programme entrant
- NG = Next Gen Accelerator Program entrant
- w/o = Walkover
- r = Retired
- d = Defaulted

=== Draw ===
First round
1	(United States) B Mattek-Sands (United States) M Oudin	6	6
(China) X Han (Russia) M Shamayko	2	4
(Finland) E Laine (United States) L Osterloh	6	5	[5]
(France) K Mladenovic (Poland) K Piter	4	7	[10]
3	(Russia) V Diatchenko (Ukraine) M Koryttseva
(Australia) J Moore (China) Y Xu	w/o
(Ukraine) A Bondarenko (Ukraine) K Bondarenko	1	3
(Russia) A Panova (Belarus) T Poutchek	6	6
(Latvia) L Dekmeijere (China) S Zhang	6	1	[10]
(Sweden) S Arvidsson (Netherlands) M Krajicek	1	6	[5]
(United States) A Glatch (United States) A Rolle	7^{10}	6
4	(Italy) A Brianti (Croatia) P Martić	6^{8}	3
WC	(Denmark) M Ejdesgaard (Denmark) C Wozniacki	6	6
WC	(United States) J Boserup (Denmark) M Grage	4	1
(Ukraine) O Savchuk (Germany) K Wörle	3	4
2	(Sweden) J Larsson (Germany) J Wöhr	6	6

Quarterfinals
1	(United States) B Mattek-Sands (United States) M Oudin	1^{r}
(France) K Mladenovic (Poland) K Piter	6
(Australia) J Moore (China) Y Xu	6	0	[13]
(Russia) A Panova (Belarus) T Poutchek	3	6	[11]
(Latvia) L Dekmeijere (China) S Zhang	2	1
(United States) A Glatch (United States) A Rolle	6	6
WC	(Denmark) M Ejdesgaard (Denmark) C Wozniacki	4	2
2	(Sweden) J Larsson (Germany) J Wöhr	6	6

Semifinals
(France) K Mladenovic (Poland) K Piter	6	7
(Australia) J Moore (China) Y Xu	4	5
(United States) A Glatch (United States) A Rolle	2	4
2	(Sweden) J Larsson (Germany) J Wöhr	6	6

Finals
(France) K Mladenovic (Poland) K Piter	3	3
2	(Sweden) J Larsson (Germany) J Wöhr	6	6
