= 2011 e-Boks Sony Ericsson Open – Singles Qualifying =

This article displays the qualifying draw of the 2011 e-Boks Sony Ericsson Open.

== Players ==
=== Seeds ===
1. (China) Han Xinyun (qualifying competition)
2. (Greece) Eirini Georgatou (qualifying competition)
3. (Germany) Mona Barthel (qualified)
4. (Ukraine) Mariya Koryttseva (second round, retired)
5. (United States) Alexa Glatch (qualified)
6. (Kazakhstan) Galina Voskoboeva (qualified)
7. (Russia) Valeria Solovieva (first round)
8. (United States) Ahsha Rolle (qualifying competition)

=== Qualifiers ===
1. (United States) Alexa Glatch
2. (Kazakhstan) Galina Voskoboeva
3. (Germany) Mona Barthel
4. (Australia) Johanna Konta

== Qualifying draw ==
=== First qualifier ===
First Round
WC | (Denmark) Julie Noe | 3 | 2
(Russia) Marina Shamayko | 6 | 6
WC | (Denmark) Ulrikke Hoyer | 0 | 3
(Finland) Emma Laine | 6 | 6
(Australia) Karolina Wlodarczak | 2 | 0
5 | (United States) Alexa Glatch | 6 | 6

Second Round
1 | (China) Han Xinyun | 6 | 7
(Russia) Marina Shamayko | 0 | 5
(Finland) Emma Laine | 2 | 3
5 | (United States) Alexa Glatch | 6 | 6

Qualifying Competition
1 | (China) Han Xinyun | 0 | 1
5 | (United States) Alexa Glatch | 6 | 6

=== Second qualifier ===
First Round
WC | (Sweden) Ellen Allgurin | 6 | 6
WC | (Denmark) Anna Signe Rasmussen | 1 | 3
WC | (Denmark) Maria Jespersen | 3 | 1
(Slovenia) Dalila Jakupović | 6 | 6
(Poland) Katarzyna Piter | 1 | 3
6 | (Kazakhstan) Galina Voskoboeva | 6 | 6

Second Round
2 | (Greece) Eirini Georgatou | 6 | 7
WC | (Sweden) Ellen Allgurin | 4 | 6^{6}
(Slovenia) Dalila Jakupović | 2 | 6^{4}
6 | (Kazakhstan) Galina Voskoboeva | 6 | 7

Qualifying Competition
2 | (Greece) Eirini Georgatou | 5 | 2
6 | (Kazakhstan) Galina Voskoboeva | 7 | 6

=== Third qualifier ===
First Round
3 | (Germany) Mona Barthel | 6 | 6
(United Kingdom) Tara Moore | 4 | 2
(France) Kristina Mladenovic | 6 | 6
(Bosnia and Herzegovina) Jasmina Tinjić | 4 | 4
(Poland) Justyna Jegiołka | 6 | 6
WC | (Denmark) Cecilie Melsted | 3 | 0
(Germany) Annika Beck | 6 | 4
7 | (Russia) Valeria Solovieva | 0 | 1^{r}

Second Round
3 | (Germany) Mona Barthel | 6 | 7
(France) Kristina Mladenovic | 4 | 5
(Poland) Justyna Jegiołka | 3 | 1
(Germany) Annika Beck | 6 | 6

Qualifying Competition
3 | (Germany) Mona Barthel | 6 | 6
(Germany) Annika Beck | 1 | 1

=== Fourth qualifier ===
First Round
4 | (Ukraine) Mariya Koryttseva | 6 | 6
(Russia) Nadejda Guskova | 2 | 2
WC | (Denmark) Mai Grage | 1 | 3
(Australia) Johanna Konta | 6 | 6
WC | (Denmark) Frederikke Svarrer | 0 | 0
(China) Xu Yifan | 6 | 6
(Denmark) Martine Ditlev | 1 | 1
8 | (United States) Ahsha Rolle | 6 | 6

Second Round
4 | (Ukraine) Mariya Koryttseva | 3 | 0^{r}
(Australia) Johanna Konta | 6 | 3
(China) Xu Yifan | 1 | 1
8 | (United States) Ahsha Rolle | 6 | 6

Qualifying Competition
(Australia) Johanna Konta | 6 | 6
8 | (United States) Ahsha Rolle | 2 | 3
