= 2015 Swedish Open =

- Date: 13–19 July (women); 20–26 July (men)
- Edition: 68th (men); 7th (women)
- Surface: Clay
- Location: Båstad, Sweden

Champions

Men's singles
- (France) Benoît Paire

Women's singles
- (Sweden) Johanna Larsson

Men's doubles
- (France) Jérémy Chardy / (Poland) Łukasz Kubot

Women's doubles
- (Netherlands) Kiki Bertens / (Sweden) Johanna Larsson
- Swedish Open

The 2015 Swedish Open was a tennis tournament played on outdoor clay courts as part of the ATP World Tour 250 Series of the 2015 ATP World Tour and as part of the International Series on the 2015 WTA Tour. It took place in Båstad, Sweden, from 13 through 19 July 2015 for the women's tournament, and from 20 through 26 July 2015 for the men's tournament. It was also known as the 2015 SkiStar Swedish Open for the men and the 2015 Collector Swedish Open for the women for sponsorship reasons. It was the 68th edition of the event for the men and the 7th edition for the women.

== Finals ==
=== Men's singles ===
- (France) Benoît Paire defeated (Spain) Tommy Robredo, 7–6^{(9–7)}, 6–3. The victory marked Paire's first ATP Tour singles title and made him the first Frenchman to win the men's Swedish Open since 1981.

=== Women's singles ===
- (Sweden) Johanna Larsson defeated (Germany) Mona Barthel, 6–3, 7–6^{(7–2)}

=== Men's doubles ===
- (France) Jérémy Chardy / (Poland) Łukasz Kubot defeated (Colombia) Juan Sebastián Cabal / (Colombia) Robert Farah, 6–7^{(6–8)}, 6–3, [10–8]

=== Women's doubles ===
- (Netherlands) Kiki Bertens / (Sweden) Johanna Larsson defeated (Germany) Tatjana Maria / (Ukraine) Olga Savchuk, 7–5, 6–4

== Points and prize money ==
=== Point distribution ===
Event	W	F	SF	QF	Round of 16	Round of 32	Round of 64	Q	Q2	Q1
Men's singles	500	300	180	90	45	20	0	10	4	0
Men's doubles	500	300	180	90	—N/a	—N/a	0	10	—N/a	0
Women's singles	280	180	110	60	30	1	—N/a	18	12	1
Women's doubles	280	180	110	60	1	—N/a	—N/a	—N/a	—N/a	—N/a

=== Prize money ===
Event	W	F	SF	QF	Round of 16	Round of 32	Round of 64^{1}	Q2	Q1
Men's singles									
Men's doubles *						—N/a	—N/a	—N/a	—N/a
Women's singles	$43,000	$21,400	$11,500	$6,175	$3,400	$2,220	—N/a	$1,020	$600
Women's doubles *	$12,300	$6,400	$3,435	$1,820	$960	—N/a	—N/a	—N/a	—N/a

_{^{1} Qualifiers prize money is also the Round of 64 prize money}
_{* per team}

== ATP singles main-draw entrants ==
=== Seeds ===
Country	Player	Rank^{1}	Seed
BEL	David Goffin	14	1
ESP	Tommy Robredo	21	2
URU	Pablo Cuevas	27	3
ARG	Juan Mónaco	30	4
ESP	Fernando Verdasco	40	5
BRA	Thomaz Bellucci	42	6
FRA	Jérémy Chardy	44	7
POL	Jerzy Janowicz	51	8

- ^{1} Rankings are as of July 13, 2015

=== Other entrants ===
The following players received wildcards into the singles main draw:

- (Sweden) Markus Eriksson
- (Sweden) Christian Lindell
- (Sweden) Elias Ymer

The following players received entry from the qualifying draw:

- (Italy) Andrea Arnaboldi
- (Brazil) Rogério Dutra Silva
- (France) Paul-Henri Mathieu
- (Germany) Julian Reister

=== Withdrawals ===
Before the tournament

- (Spain) David Ferrer → replaced by (Latvia) Ernests Gulbis
- (Spain) Guillermo García López → replaced by (Italy) Luca Vanni

== ATP doubles main-draw entrants ==
=== Seeds ===
Country	Player	Country	Player	Rank^{1}	Seed
COL	Juan Sebastián Cabal	COL	Robert Farah	60	1
FRA	Jérémy Chardy	POL	Łukasz Kubot	86	2
USA	Nicholas Monroe	NZL	Artem Sitak	107	3
SWE	Johan Brunström	SWE	Robert Lindstedt	137	4

- Rankings are as of July 13, 2015

=== Other entrants ===
The following pairs received wildcards into the doubles main draw:

- (Sweden) Isak Arvidsson / (Sweden) Markus Eriksson
- (Sweden) Jonathan Mridha / (Sweden) Fred Simonsson

== WTA singles main-draw entrants ==
=== Seeds ===
Country	Player	Rank^{1}	Seed
USA	Serena Williams	1	1
AUS	Samantha Stosur	23	2
CZE	Barbora Strýcová	29	3
GER	Mona Barthel	49	4
GER	Carina Witthöft	53	5
CZE	Kateřina Siniaková	67	6
SWE	Johanna Larsson	73	7
GER	Tatjana Maria	78	8

- ^{1} Rankings are as of June 29, 2015

=== Other entrants ===
The following players received wildcards into the singles main draw:

- (Sweden) Sofia Arvidsson
- (Sweden) Susanne Celik
- (Sweden) Rebecca Peterson

The following players received entry from the qualifying draw:

- (France) Alizé Lim
- (Luxembourg) Mandy Minella
- (Belgium) Ysaline Bonaventure
- (Ukraine) Maryna Zanevska
- (Estonia) Anett Kontaveit
- (Netherlands) Arantxa Rus

=== Withdrawals ===
Before the tournament

- (Estonia) Kaia Kanepi → replaced by (Belarus) Olga Govortsova
- (United States) Bethanie Mattek-Sands → replaced by (Ukraine) Yuliya Beygelzimer
- (United States) Christina McHale → replaced by (Netherlands) Richèl Hogenkamp
- (United States) Sloane Stephens → replaced by (United States) Grace Min

During the tournament

- (United States) Serena Williams (right elbow injury)

== WTA doubles main-draw entrants ==
=== Seeds ===
Country	Player	Country	Player	Rank^{1}	Seed
TPE	Chan Hao-ching	TPE	Chan Yung-jan	62	1
CZE	Barbora Strýcová	CZE	Renata Voráčová	77	2
LUX	Mandy Minella	CZE	Kateřina Siniaková	132	3
NED	Kiki Bertens	SWE	Johanna Larsson	138	4

- ^{1} Rankings are as of June 29, 2015

=== Other entrants ===
The following pairs received wildcards into the doubles main draw:

- (Sweden) Sofia Arvidsson / (Sweden) Susanne Celik
- (Sweden) Cornelia Lister / (Sweden) Malin Ulvefeldt

=== Withdrawals ===
During the tournament

- (Luxembourg) Mandy Minella (low back injury)
