= 2015 Swedish Open – Women's doubles =

Women's doubles
- 2015 Swedish Open

Final
- Champions: (Netherlands) Kiki Bertens (Sweden) Johanna Larsson
- Runners-up: (Germany) Tatjana Maria (Ukraine) Olga Savchuk
- Score: 7–5, 6–4

Events
Singles	men	women
Doubles	men	women
- Swedish Open

Andreja Klepač and María Teresa Torró Flor were the defending champions, but they chose not to participate this year.

Kiki Bertens and Johanna Larsson won the title, defeating Tatjana Maria and Olga Savchuk in the final, 7–5, 6–4.

== Seeds ==
1. (Chinese Taipei) Chan Hao-ching / (Chinese Taipei) Chan Yung-jan (quarterfinals)
2. (Czech Republic) Barbora Strýcová / (Czech Republic) Renata Voráčová (quarterfinals)
3. (Luxembourg) Mandy Minella / (Czech Republic) Kateřina Siniaková (quarterfinals, withdrew)
4. (Netherlands) Kiki Bertens / (Sweden) Johanna Larsson (champions)

== Draw ==
Key

- Q = Qualifier
- WC = Wild card
- LL = Lucky loser
- Alt = Alternate
- ITF = ITF entry
- PR = Protected ranking
- SR = Special ranking
- SE = Special exempt
- JE = Junior exempt
- JR = Junior Accelerator Programme entrant
- CO = College Accelerator Programme entrant
- NG = Next Gen Accelerator Program entrant
- w/o = Walkover
- r = Retired
- d = Defaulted

First round
1	(Chinese Taipei) H-c Chan (Chinese Taipei) Y-j Chan	6	7
(Russia) E Rodina (Liechtenstein) S Vogt	3	5
(Germany) T Maria (Ukraine) O Savchuk	6	6
WC	(Sweden) C Lister (Sweden) M Ulvefeldt	3	1
3	(Luxembourg) M Minella (Czech Republic) K Siniaková	6	5	[10]
(Belgium) Y Bonaventure (Sweden) R Peterson	3	7	[6]
WC	(Sweden) S Arvidsson (Sweden) S Celik	6	3	[2]
(Spain) L Arruabarrena (Spain) B García Vidagany	3	6	[10]
(Slovakia) J Husárová (Poland) P Kania	6	7
(Slovakia) J Čepelová (France) A Lim	3	5
(Russia) M Melnikova (Croatia) A Vrljić	4	0
4	(Netherlands) K Bertens (Sweden) J Larsson	6	6
(United Kingdom) J Rae (United Kingdom) A Smith	1	0
(Germany) M Barthel (Germany) L Siegemund	6	6
(United States) N Melichar (Ukraine) M Zanevska	6	2	[4]
2	(Czech Republic) B Strýcová (Czech Republic) R Voráčová	3	6	[10]

Quarterfinals
1	(Chinese Taipei) H-c Chan (Chinese Taipei) Y-j Chan	7	1	[8]
(Germany) T Maria (Ukraine) O Savchuk	5	6	[10]
3	(Luxembourg) M Minella (Czech Republic) K Siniaková
(Spain) L Arruabarrena (Spain) B García Vidagany	w/o
(Slovakia) J Husárová (Poland) P Kania	3	2
4	(Netherlands) K Bertens (Sweden) J Larsson	6	6
(Germany) M Barthel (Germany) L Siegemund	6	4	[11]
2	(Czech Republic) B Strýcová (Czech Republic) R Voráčová	3	6	[9]

Semifinals
(Germany) T Maria (Ukraine) O Savchuk	6	6
(Spain) L Arruabarrena (Spain) B García Vidagany	1	4
4	(Netherlands) K Bertens (Sweden) J Larsson	3	6	[12]
(Germany) M Barthel (Germany) L Siegemund	6	3	[10]

Final
(Germany) T Maria (Ukraine) O Savchuk	5	4
4	(Netherlands) K Bertens (Sweden) J Larsson	7	6
