= 2015 Swedish Open – Men's doubles =

Men's doubles
- 2015 Swedish Open

Final
- Champions: (France) Jérémy Chardy (Poland) Łukasz Kubot
- Runners-up: (Colombia) Juan Sebastián Cabal (Colombia) Robert Farah
- Score: 6–7^{(6–8)}, 6–3, [10–8]

Events
Singles	men	women
Doubles	men	women
← 2014 ·	Swedish Open	· 2016 →

Johan Brunström and Nicholas Monroe were the defending champions, but chose not to participate together. Brunström played alongside Robert Lindstedt, but lost in the quarterfinals to Thomaz Bellucci and João Souza. Monroe teamed up with Artem Sitak, but lost in the semifinals to Juan Sebastián Cabal and Robert Farah.
Jérémy Chardy and Łukasz Kubot won the title, defeating Cabal and Farah in the final, 6–7^{(6–8)}, 6–3, [10–8].

== Seeds ==
1. (Colombia) Juan Sebastián Cabal / (Colombia) Robert Farah (final)
2. (France) Jérémy Chardy / (Poland) Łukasz Kubot (champions)
3. (United States) Nicholas Monroe / (New Zealand) Artem Sitak (semifinals)
4. (Sweden) Johan Brunström / (Sweden) Robert Lindstedt (quarterfinals)

== Draw ==
=== Key ===
- Q = Qualifier
- WC = Wild card
- LL = Lucky loser
- Alt = Alternate
- SE = Special exempt
- PR = Protected ranking
- ITF = ITF entry
- JE = Junior exempt
- w/o = Walkover
- r = Retired
- d = Defaulted
- SR = Special ranking

=== Draw ===
First round
1	(Colombia) JS Cabal (Colombia) R Farah	7	6
(Republic of Ireland) J Cluskey (Sweden) A Siljeström	5	2
(France) K de Schepper (Brazil) R Dutra Silva	5	7^{7}	[10]
(Uzbekistan) D Istomin (France) S Robert	7	6^{5}	[4]
3	(United States) N Monroe (New Zealand) A Sitak	6	6^{5}	[10]
(United States) J Cerretani (Romania) C Pavăl	4	7^{7}	[7]
WC	(Sweden) I Arvidsson (Sweden) M Eriksson	4	5
WC	(Sweden) J Mridha (Sweden) F Simonsson	6	7
(Brazil) T Bellucci (Brazil) J Souza	6	7^{7}
(Germany) G Kretschmer (Germany) A Satschko	4	6^{1}
(Italy) A Motti (Spain) A Ramos-Viñolas	6	4	[9]
4	(Sweden) J Brunström (Sweden) R Lindstedt	4	6	[11]
PR	(Poland) T Bednarek (Poland) J Janowicz	7^{7}	5	[5]
(Belarus) S Betov (Russia) M Elgin	6^{5}	7	[10]
(Argentina) G Durán (Argentina) D Schwartzman	6^{1}	1
2	(France) J Chardy (Poland) Ł Kubot	7^{7}	6

Quarterfinals
1	(Colombia) JS Cabal (Colombia) R Farah	6	6
(France) K de Schepper (Brazil) R Dutra Silva	4	1
3	(United States) N Monroe (New Zealand) A Sitak	7^{10}	6
WC	(Sweden) J Mridha (Sweden) F Simonsson	6^{8}	1
(Brazil) T Bellucci (Brazil) J Souza	6	6
4	(Sweden) J Brunström (Sweden) R Lindstedt	2	1
(Belarus) S Betov (Russia) M Elgin	3	7^{9}	[7]
2	(France) J Chardy (Poland) Ł Kubot	6	6^{7}	[10]

Semifinals
1	(Colombia) JS Cabal (Colombia) R Farah	6	6
3	(United States) N Monroe (New Zealand) A Sitak	4	3
(Brazil) T Bellucci (Brazil) J Souza	3	6^{5}
2	(France) J Chardy (Poland) Ł Kubot	6	7^{7}

Final
1	(Colombia) JS Cabal (Colombia) R Farah	7^{8}	3	[8]
2	(France) J Chardy (Poland) Ł Kubot	6^{6}	6	[10]
