= 2015 Swedish Open – Women's singles =

Women's singles
- 2015 Swedish Open

Final
- Champion: (Sweden) Johanna Larsson
- Runner-up: (Germany) Mona Barthel
- Score: 6–3, 7–6^{(7–2)}

Events
Singles	men	women
Doubles	men	women
- Swedish Open

Mona Barthel was the defending champion, but she lost to Johanna Larsson in the final, 3–6, 6–7^{(2–7)}. It was her first WTA Tour title.

== Seeds ==
1. (United States) Serena Williams (second round, withdrew because of a right elbow injury)
2. (Australia) Samantha Stosur (second round)
3. (Czech Republic) Barbora Strýcová (quarterfinals)
4. (Germany) Mona Barthel (final)
5. (Germany) Carina Witthöft (first round)
6. (Czech Republic) Kateřina Siniaková (second round)
7. (Sweden) Johanna Larsson (champion)
8. (Germany) Tatjana Maria (first round)

== Draw ==
Key

- Q = Qualifier
- WC = Wild card
- LL = Lucky loser
- Alt = Alternate
- ITF = ITF entry
- PR = Protected ranking
- SR = Special ranking
- SE = Special exempt
- JE = Junior exempt
- JR = Junior Accelerator Programme entrant
- CO = College Accelerator Programme entrant
- NG = Next Gen Accelerator Program entrant
- w/o = Walkover
- r = Retired
- d = Defaulted

=== Finals ===
Semifinals
(Kazakhstan) Yulia Putintseva	4	2
7	(Sweden) Johanna Larsson	6	6
4	(Germany) Mona Barthel	6	6
(Spain) Lara Arruabarrena	3	2

Final
7	(Sweden) Johanna Larsson	6	7^{7}
4	(Germany) Mona Barthel	3	6^{2}

=== Top half ===
First round
1	(United States) S Williams	6	6
Q	(Belgium) Y Bonaventure	2	1
(Czech Republic) K Koukalová	7^{10}	6
WC	(Sweden) S Celik	6^{8}	3
Q	(France) A Lim	4	6	6
(Spain) L Domínguez Lino	6	4	3
(Kazakhstan) Y Putintseva	6	6
8	(Germany) T Maria	4	1
3	(Czech Republic) B Strýcová	6	6
(United States) G Min	4	2
Q	(Netherlands) A Rus	5	6	4
(Russia) E Rodina	7	4	6
(Spain) S Sorribes Tormo	1	2
(Germany) A-L Friedsam	6	6
(Netherlands) R Hogenkamp	1	3
7	(Sweden) J Larsson	6	6

Second round
1	(United States) S Williams
(Czech Republic) K Koukalová	w/o
Q	(France) A Lim	0	6	2
(Kazakhstan) Y Putintseva	6	1	6
3	(Czech Republic) B Strýcová	6	6
(Russia) E Rodina	4	1
(Germany) A-L Friedsam	3	5
7	(Sweden) J Larsson	6	7

Quarterfinals
(Czech Republic) K Koukalová	3	4
(Kazakhstan) Y Putintseva	6	6
3	(Czech Republic) B Strýcová	2	3
7	(Sweden) J Larsson	6	6

Semifinals
(Kazakhstan) Y Putintseva	4	2
7	(Sweden) J Larsson	6	6

=== Bottom half ===
First round
6	(Czech Republic) K Siniaková	6	6
(Ukraine) Y Beygelzimer	2	4
WC	(Sweden) R Peterson	6	2	6
Q	(Luxembourg) M Minella	4	6	4
Q	(Ukraine) M Zanevska	7^{10}	3	6
(Germany) L Siegemund	6^{8}	6	2
(Netherlands) K Bertens	7^{7}	2	3
4	(Germany) M Barthel	6^{4}	6	6
5	(Germany) C Witthöft	6	3	4
(Slovakia) J Čepelová	2	6	6
Q	(Estonia) A Kontaveit	7	4	1
(Belarus) O Govortsova	5	6	6
(Spain) L Arruabarrena	6	6
WC	(Sweden) S Arvidsson	2	1
(Israel) J Glushko	1	1
2	(Australia) S Stosur	6	6

Second round
6	(Czech Republic) K Siniaková	5	6^{6}
WC	(Sweden) R Peterson	7	7^{8}
Q	(Ukraine) M Zanevska	0	0
4	(Germany) M Barthel	6	6
(Slovakia) J Čepelová	4	6	6
(Belarus) O Govortsova	6	3	2
(Spain) L Arruabarrena	7^{7}	6
2	(Australia) S Stosur	6^{5}	0

Quarterfinals
WC	(Sweden) R Peterson	1	6^{3}
4	(Germany) M Barthel	6	7^{7}
(Slovakia) J Čepelová	3	2^{r}
(Spain) L Arruabarrena	6	5

Semifinals
4	(Germany) M Barthel	6	6
(Spain) L Arruabarrena	3	2

== Qualifying ==
=== Seeds ===
1. (Croatia) Donna Vekić (first round)
2. (Poland) Paula Kania (qualifying competition)
3. (Belarus) Aliaksandra Sasnovich (first round)
4. (Ukraine) Maryna Zanevska (qualified)
5. (Estonia) Anett Kontaveit (qualified)
6. (Liechtenstein) Stephanie Vogt (first round)
7. (United States) Alexa Glatch (first round)
8. (Russia) Marina Melnikova (qualifying competition)
9. (Italy) Alberta Brianti (qualifying competition)
10. (Czech Republic) Renata Voráčová (first round)
11. (Spain) Laura Pous Tió (qualifying competition)
12. (Belgium) Ysaline Bonaventure (qualified)

=== Qualifiers ===
1. (France) Alizé Lim
2. (Luxembourg) Mandy Minella
3. (Belgium) Ysaline Bonaventure
4. (Ukraine) Maryna Zanevska
5. (Estonia) Anett Kontaveit
6. (Netherlands) Arantxa Rus

=== Draw ===
==== First qualifier ====
First round
1	(Croatia) Donna Vekić	4	1
(France) Alizé Lim	6	6
WC	(Sweden) Jacqueline Cabaj Awad	3	3
11	(Spain) Laura Pous Tió	6	6

Qualifying competition
(France) Alizé Lim	6	6
11	(Spain) Laura Pous Tió	4	3

==== Second qualifier ====
First round
2	(Poland) Paula Kania	6	6
(Sweden) Ellen Allgurin	3	4
(Luxembourg) Mandy Minella	7	3	6
10	(Czech Republic) Renata Voráčová	5	6	3

Qualifying competition
2	(Poland) Paula Kania	1	3
(Luxembourg) Mandy Minella	6	6

==== Third qualifier ====
First round
3	(Belarus) Aliaksandra Sasnovich	2	6^{4}
WC	(Sweden) Cornelia Lister	6	7^{7}
(Croatia) Ana Vrljić	2	1
12	(Belgium) Ysaline Bonaventure	6	6

Qualifying competition
WC	(Sweden) Cornelia Lister	3	6	1
12	(Belgium) Ysaline Bonaventure	6	1	6

==== Fourth qualifier ====
First round
4	(Ukraine) Maryna Zanevska	6	3	6
(Switzerland) Conny Perrin	3	6	1
(Chinese Taipei) Chan Yung-jan	6	3	6^{4}
8	(Russia) Marina Melnikova	3	6	7^{7}

Qualifying competition
4	(Ukraine) Maryna Zanevska	6	6
8	(Russia) Marina Melnikova	3	2

==== Fifth qualifier ====
First round
5	(Estonia) Anett Kontaveit	6	4	6
WC	(Sweden) Malin Ulvefeldt	3	6	3
WC	(Sweden) Kajsa Rinaldo Persson	2	2
9	(Italy) Alberta Brianti	6	6

Qualifying competition
5	(Estonia) Anett Kontaveit	6	2	6
9	(Italy) Alberta Brianti	2	6	4

==== Sixth qualifier ====
First round
6	(Liechtenstein) Stephanie Vogt	4	4
(Italy) Nastassja Burnett	6	6
(Netherlands) Arantxa Rus	1	7	6
7	(United States) Alexa Glatch	6	5	1

Qualifying competition
(Italy) Nastassja Burnett	6	3	1
(Netherlands) Arantxa Rus	3	6	6
