= 2015 Swedish Open – Men's singles =

Men's singles
- 2015 Swedish Open

Final
- Champion: (France) Benoît Paire
- Runner-up: (Spain) Tommy Robredo
- Score: 7–6^{(9–7)}, 6–3

Details
- Draw: 28
- Seeds: 8

Events
Singles	men	women
Doubles	men	women
← 2014 ·	Swedish Open	· 2016 →

Pablo Cuevas was the defending champion. He lost his title in the semifinals to Benoît Paire. Paire went on to win the title, defeating Tommy Robredo in the final, 7–6^{(9–7)}, 6–3.

== Seeds ==
The top four seeds receive a bye into the second round.

1. (Belgium) David Goffin (second round)
2. (Spain) Tommy Robredo (final)
3. (Uruguay) Pablo Cuevas (semifinals)
4. (Argentina) Juan Mónaco (second round)
5. (Spain) Fernando Verdasco (first round)
6. (Brazil) Thomaz Bellucci (quarterfinals)
7. (France) Jérémy Chardy (first round)
8. (Poland) Jerzy Janowicz (second round)

== Draw ==
=== Key ===
- Q = Qualifier
- WC = Wild card
- LL = Lucky loser
- Alt = Alternate
- SE = Special exempt
- PR = Protected ranking
- ITF = ITF entry
- JE = Junior exempt
- w/o = Walkover
- r = Retired
- d = Defaulted
- SR = Special ranking

=== Finals ===
Semifinals
(France) Benoît Paire	6	6
3	(Uruguay) Pablo Cuevas	4	3
(Germany) Alexander Zverev	3	4
2	(Spain) Tommy Robredo	6	6

Final
(France) Benoît Paire	7^{9}	6
2	(Spain) Tommy Robredo	6^{7}	3

=== Top half ===
First round
WC	(Sweden) M Eriksson	6^{4}	3
(France) B Paire	7^{7}	6
(Argentina) D Schwartzman	3	4
(Uzbekistan) D Istomin	6	6
PR	(Spain) N Almagro	6	1	7
5	(Spain) F Verdasco	4	6	5
(Argentina) F Delbonis	1	6	6
Q	(Brazil) R Dutra Silva	6	4	4
(Spain) D Gimeno Traver	4	3
(Belgium) S Darcis	6	6
Q	(Italy) A Arnaboldi	4	5
8	(Poland) J Janowicz	6	7

Second round
1	(Belgium) D Goffin	2	3
(France) B Paire	6	6
(Uzbekistan) D Istomin	6	6
PR	(Spain) N Almagro	3	3
3	(Uruguay) P Cuevas	6	6^{6}	6
(Argentina) F Delbonis	3	7^{8}	0
(Belgium) S Darcis	6	6
8	(Poland) J Janowicz	1	4

Quarterfinals
(France) B Paire	6	6
(Uzbekistan) D Istomin	4	2
3	(Uruguay) P Cuevas	6	6
(Belgium) S Darcis	3	4

Semifinals
(France) B Paire	6	6
3	(Uruguay) P Cuevas	4	3

=== Bottom half ===
First round
6	(Brazil) T Bellucci	6	6
WC	(Sweden) E Ymer	4	2
WC	(Sweden) C Lindell	6	3	6
(Brazil) J Souza	2	6	4
Q	(Germany) J Reister	7^{7}	4	3
(Germany) A Zverev	6^{4}	6	6
7	(France) J Chardy	5	3
Q	(France) P-H Mathieu	7	6
(Latvia) E Gulbis	6	6
(Turkey) M İlhan	2	0
(Italy) L Vanni	4	4
(Spain) A Ramos	6	6

Second round
6	(Brazil) T Bellucci	6	6
WC	(Sweden) C Lindell	3	4
(Germany) A Zverev	6	6
4	(Argentina) J Mónaco	4	2
Q	(France) P-H Mathieu	6	6
(Latvia) E Gulbis	3	3
(Spain) A Ramos	4	4
2	(Spain) T Robredo	6	6

Quarterfinals
6	(Brazil) T Bellucci	7	4	2
(Germany) A Zverev	5	6	6
Q	(France) P-H Mathieu	3	3
2	(Spain) T Robredo	6	6

Semifinals
(Germany) A Zverev	3	4
2	(Spain) T Robredo	6	6

== Qualifying ==
=== Seeds ===
1. (France) Paul-Henri Mathieu (qualified)
2. (France) Kenny de Schepper (second round)
3. (Italy) Andrea Arnaboldi (qualified)
4. (Argentina) Renzo Olivo (second round)
5. (Ecuador) Giovanni Lapentti (qualifying competition)
6. (Brazil) Rogério Dutra Silva (qualified)
7. (Belarus) Maxim Dubarenco (qualifying competition)
8. (France) Constant Lestienne (qualifying competition)

=== Qualifiers ===
1. (France) Paul-Henri Mathieu
2. (Brazil) Rogério Dutra Silva
3. (Italy) Andrea Arnaboldi
4. (Germany) Julian Reister

=== Qualifying draw ===
==== First qualifier ====
First round
1	(France) Paul-Henri Mathieu	6	7
(Sweden) Daniel Windahl	1	5
(Australia) Peter Luczak	6	6^{5}	6
(Sweden) Stefan Lindmark	3	7^{7}	3
(Sweden) Isak Arvidsson	7	6
WC	(Sweden) André Göransson	5	0
(Czech Republic) Robin Staňek	2	6	4
5	(Ecuador) Giovanni Lapentti	6	4	6

Second round
1	(France) Paul-Henri Mathieu	6	6
(Australia) Peter Luczak	2	4
(Sweden) Isak Arvidsson	2	3
5	(Ecuador) Giovanni Lapentti	6	6

Qualifying competition
1	(France) Paul-Henri Mathieu	6	6
5	(Ecuador) Giovanni Lapentti	2	3

==== Second qualifier ====
First round
2	(France) Kenny de Schepper	6	6
(France) Gleb Sakharov	2	2
(France) Stéphane Robert	1	7	6
(Sweden) Fred Simonsson	6	5	3
(Republic of Ireland) Daniel Glancy	0	0
(Germany) Mischa Zverev	6	6
(Sweden) Jonathan Mridha	2	0
6	(Brazil) Rogério Dutra Silva	6	6

Second round
2	(France) Kenny de Schepper	5	6^{5}
(France) Stéphane Robert	7	7^{7}
(Germany) Mischa Zverev	4	4
6	(Brazil) Rogério Dutra Silva	6	6

Qualifying competition
(France) Stéphane Robert	2	4
6	(Brazil) Rogério Dutra Silva	6	6

==== Third qualifier ====
First round
3	(Italy) Andrea Arnaboldi	6	6
WC	(Sweden) Daniel Appelgren	4	2
WC	(Romania) Dragoș Nicolae Mădăraș	6	6
(Russia) Mikhail Ledovskikh	2	4
WC	(Sweden) Filip Bergevi	7	2	6
(Colombia) Robert Farah	5	6	2
(Sweden) Sam Taylor	6^{4}	4
7	(Belarus) Maxim Dubarenco	7^{7}	6

Second round
3	(Italy) Andrea Arnaboldi	7	6
WC	(Romania) Dragoș Nicolae Mădăraș	5	2
WC	(Sweden) Filip Bergevi	4	6	4
7	(Belarus) Maxim Dubarenco	6	3	6

Qualifying competition
3	(Italy) Andrea Arnaboldi	7^{7}	6
7	(Belarus) Maxim Dubarenco	6^{5}	3

==== Fourth qualifier ====
First round
4	(Argentina) Renzo Olivo	6^{5}	6	6
(Denmark) Martin Pedersen	7^{7}	3	2
(Sweden) Lucas Renard	3	2
(Germany) Julian Reister	6	6
(Spain) Oscar Mesquida Berg	6	4	4
(Switzerland) Sandro Ehrat	3	6	6
(Sweden) Jacob Adaktusson	4	2
8	(France) Constant Lestienne	6	6

Second round
4	(Argentina) Renzo Olivo	3	4
(Germany) Julian Reister	6	6
(Switzerland) Sandro Ehrat	6^{3}	4
8	(France) Constant Lestienne	7^{7}	6

Qualifying competition
(Germany) Julian Reister	6	6
8	(France) Constant Lestienne	4	3
