= 2011 e-Boks Sony Ericsson Open =

- Date: 6–12 June
- Edition: 2nd
- Category: WTA International
- Draw: 32S / 16D
- Prize money: $220,000
- Surface: Hard / indoor
- Location: Farum, Denmark

Champions

Singles
- (Denmark) Caroline Wozniacki

Doubles
- (Sweden) Johanna Larsson / (Germany) Jasmin Wöhr
- Danish Open

The 2011 e-Boks Sony Ericsson Open was the second edition of the tennis tournament e-Boks Danish Open, an international-level tournament on the 2011 WTA Tour. It was the second edition of the tournament. It took place on indoor hard courts in Farum, Denmark between 6 June and 12 June 2011. First-seeded Caroline Wozniacki won her second consecutive singles title at the event.

== Finals ==
=== Singles ===
(Denmark) Caroline Wozniacki defeated (Czech Republic) Lucie Šafářová, 6–1, 6–4

- It was Wozniacki's 5th singles title of the year and 17th of her career.

=== Doubles ===
(Sweden) Johanna Larsson / (Germany) Jasmin Wöhr defeated (France) Kristina Mladenovic / (Poland) Katarzyna Piter, 6–3, 6–3

== WTA entrants ==
=== Seeds ===
Country	Player	Rank*	Seed
DEN	Caroline Wozniacki	1	1
CZE	Klára Zakopalová	32	2
USA	Bethanie Mattek-Sands	34	3
CZE	Lucie Šafářová	37	4
CZE	Barbora Záhlavová-Strýcová	49	5
LAT	Anastasija Sevastova	53	6
AUS	Jelena Dokić	59	7
ITA	Alberta Brianti	63	8

- ^{1} Rankings are as of May 23, 2011.

=== Other entrants ===
The following players received wildcards into the singles main draw:

- (United States) Julia Boserup
- (Denmark) Malou Ejdesgaard
- (Czech Republic) Karolína Plíšková

The following players received entry from the qualifying draw:

- (Germany) Mona Barthel
- (United States) Alexa Glatch
- (Australia) Johanna Konta
- (Kazakhstan) Galina Voskoboeva
