= 2010 e-Boks Danish Open =

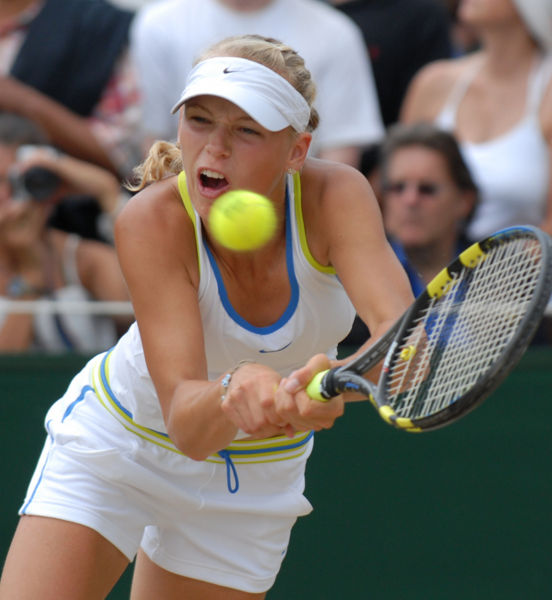
- Date: 2–8 August
- Category: WTA International
- Draw: 32S / 16D
- Prize money: $220,000
- Surface: Hard / indoor
- Location: Farum, Denmark

Champions

Singles
- (Denmark) Caroline Wozniacki

Doubles
- (Germany) Julia Görges / (Germany) Anna-Lena Grönefeld
- e-Boks Danish Open

The 2010 e-Boks Sony Ericsson Open was the first edition of the women's tennis tournament e-Boks Danish Open, an International-level tournament on the 2010 WTA Tour. It took place on indoor hard courts in Farum, Denmark from 2 August until 8 August 2010. The Danish top-seeded player Caroline Wozniacki won the singles title.

== Finals ==
=== Singles ===
(Denmark) Caroline Wozniacki defeated (Czech Republic) Klára Zakopalová 6–2, 7–6^{(7–5)}

- It was Wozniacki's second singles title of the year and eighth of her career.

=== Doubles ===
(Germany) Julia Görges / (Germany) Anna-Lena Grönefeld defeated (Russia) Vitalia Diatchenko / (Belarus) Tatiana Poutchek, 6–4, 6–4

== WTA entrants ==
=== Seeds ===
Player	Nationality	Ranking*	Seed
Caroline Wozniacki	Denmark	3	1
Li Na	China	10	2
Petra Kvitová	Czech Republic	31	3
Tsvetana Pironkova	Bulgaria	33	4
Julia Görges	Germany	42	5
Polona Hercog	Slovenia	48	6
Klára Zakopalová	Czech Republic	50	7
Angelique Kerber	Germany	53	8

- Seedings are based on the rankings of July 19, 2010.

=== Other entrants ===
The following players received wildcards into the singles main draw:

- (Denmark) Malou Ejdesgaard
- (Czech Republic) Kristýna Plíšková
- (Slovenia) Katarina Srebotnik

The following players received entry from the qualifying draw:

- (Russia) Elena Bovina (as a Lucky loser)
- (Russia) Anna Chakvetadze
- (Poland) Marta Domachowska
- (United States) Alexa Glatch
- (Germany) Anna-Lena Grönefeld
