= E-Boks =

Danish electronic mail platform

e-Boks A/S
- Company type: Private
- Founded: 2001
- Headquarters: Hellerup, Denmark
- Number of employees: 85
- Parent: CataCap
- Website: https://global.e-boks.com/

E-Boks A/S is a Danish company that provides a secure digital postbox platform used for the distribution and storage of electronic documents. The service is widely used internationally by public authorities and private organisations in regulated industries, including postal operators, financial institutions, insurers, utilities, and telecommunications providers to send sensitive documents such as tax notices, payslips and bank statements to residents and businesses.

E-Boks was launched in 2001 and is headquartered in Denmark. Today, E-Boks' solutions are used by 30,000 organisations and more than 25 million users worldwide.

== History ==
E-Boks was originally developed by the Danish IT firm KMD in cooperation with Post Danmark (now PostNord) and several Danish banks as a mainframe application. Over time the platform was modernised and migrated to a multi-tier .NET architecture.

In 2009, PBS (a predecessor to Nets) and Post Danmark acquired KMD's shareholding in E-Boks, resulting in joint ownership between PBS/Nets and Post Danmark (now PostNord).

As part of Denmark's national digitisation strategy, the Danish Parliament adopted the Act on Public Digital Post in June 2012. The law made it mandatory for businesses (from 2013) and residents aged 15 and above (from 1 November 2014) to receive Digital Post from public authorities, which could be accessed through services including E-Boks.

In March 2025, the private equity firm CataCap agreed to acquire E-Boks A/S from Nets and PostNord; the deal later received regulatory approval.

== Services and operations ==
E-Boks operates a secure digital postbox platform used by public bodies and private senders to deliver documents electronically. The platform supports secure document delivery, two-way communication, electronic signatures and forms, and integration with national identity frameworks (e.g., Danish CPR-based IDs).

Building on experience from 5.3 million users in Denmark, E-Boks has launched international deployments and collaborations supporting digital post solutions in countries such as Norway, Greenland, Sweden, and Ireland. In September 2025, E-Boks and national operator Oman Post signed an agreement to establish and operate Oman's official national digital postbox.

In the context of the EU's eIDAS 2.0 framework and the planned European Digital Identity Wallet (EUDI Wallet), E-Boks has announced wallet-related initiatives and partnerships, including a partnering with startup dewa on a digital identity wallet aligned with eIDAS 2.0.
