= Pauline Wong =

Dutch tennis player

- Country (sports): Netherlands
- Residence: Amsterdam
- Born: 23 November 1985 (age 39); Vlaardingen, Netherlands
- Turned pro: 2001
- Retired: 2009
- Plays: Right-handed (two-handed backhand)
- Prize money: $37,985

Singles
- Career record: 122–94
- Career titles: 4 ITF
- Highest ranking: No. 323 (28 January 2008)

Doubles
- Career record: 42–42
- Career titles: 4 ITF
- Highest ranking: No. 257 (26 May 2008)

Pauline Wong (born 23 November 1985) is a former professional Dutch tennis player.

She won eight ITF titles in her career- four apiece in singles and doubles. Her highest singles ranking was world No. 323, which she achieved on 28 January 2008. Wong participated at the Odense Open in 2008, but lost in the first round.

== ITF Circuit finals ==
$25,000 tournaments
$10,000 tournaments

=== Singles: 7 (4 titles, 3 runner-ups) ===
Result	No.	Date	Tournament	Surface	Opponent	Score
Loss	1.	30 October 2005	ITF Porto Santo, Portugal	Hard	(Romania) Sorana Cîrstea	2–6, 6–7^{(3)}
Loss	2.	25 June 2006	ITF Alkmaar, Netherlands	Clay	(Netherlands) Daniëlle Harmsen	1–6, 1–6
Loss	3.	27 August 2006	ITF Vlaardingen, Netherlands	Clay	(Portugal) Neuza Silva	1–6, 2–6
Win	4.	1 April 2007	ITF Bath, Great Britain	Hard (i)	(United Kingdom) Julia Bone	6–3, 6–0
Win	5.	26 August 2007	ITF Sutton, Great Britain	Hard	(Slovakia) Martina Babáková	6–4, 6–1
Win	6.	2 September 2007	ITF Enschede, Netherlands	Clay	(Netherlands) Daniëlle Harmsen	7–6^{(1)}, 6–4
Win	7.	18 September 2007	ITF Nottingham, Great Britain	Hard	(United Kingdom) Anna Smith	7–5, 6–2

=== Doubles: 5 (4 titles, 1 runner-up) ===
Result	No.	Date	Tournament	Surface	Partner	Opponents	Score
Win	1.	10 September 2006	ITF Enschede, Netherlands	Clay	(Netherlands) Marlot Meddens	(China) Guo Xuanyu (China) Zhou Yimiao	7–6^{(6)}, 6–2
Win	2.	1 April 2007	ITF Bath, Great Britain	Hard (i)	(United Kingdom) Laura Haberkorn	(United Kingdom) Anna Hawkins (United Kingdom) Elizabeth Thomas	6–1, 3–6, 6–1
Loss	3.	26 February 2008	ITF Fort Walton Beach, United States	Hard	(Netherlands) Nicole Thyssen	(United Kingdom) Anna Fitzpatrick (Montenegro) Ana Veselinović	6–3, 6–7^{(4)}
Win	4.	18 August 2008	ITF Enschede, Netherlands	Clay	(Netherlands) Chayenne Ewijk	(Canada) Daniela Covello (Netherlands) Bo Verhulsdonk	6–1, 6–4
Win	5.	10 May 2009	ITF Wiesbaden, Germany	Clay	(Netherlands) Leonie Mekel	(Romania) Alexandra Cadanțu (Romania) Alexandra Stuparu	6–1, 6–3
