= Anna Smith (tennis) =

British tennis player (born 1988)

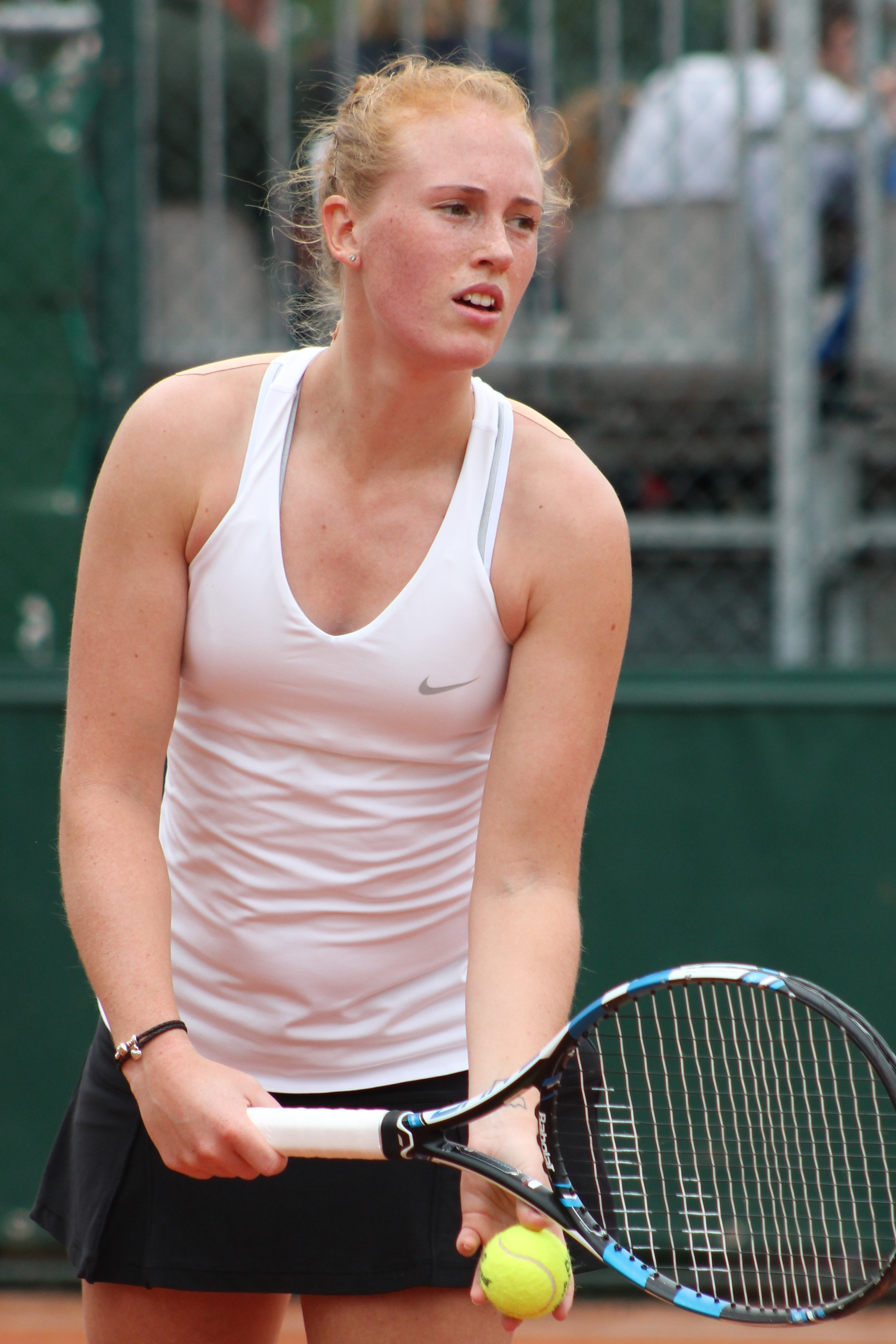
- Anna Smith playing at the 2016 French Open
- Country (sports): United Kingdom
- Born: 14 August 1988 (age 37) Redhill, Surrey, England
- Height: 1.74 m (5 ft 9 in)
- Turned pro: 2004
- Plays: Right (two-handed backhand)
- Prize money: $405,594

Singles
- Career record: 211–175
- Career titles: 5 ITF
- Highest ranking: No. 262 (9 August 2010)

Grand Slam singles results
- Wimbledon: Q2 (2008)

Doubles
- Career record: 287–203
- Career titles: 1 WTA, 29 ITF
- Highest ranking: No. 46 (21 May 2018)

Grand Slam doubles results
- Australian Open: 3R (2016)
- French Open: 2R (2016, 2017)
- Wimbledon: 2R (2015)
- US Open: 1R (2015, 2017)

Grand Slam mixed doubles results
- Wimbledon: 3R (2010, 2016)

Team competitions
- Fed Cup: 6–1

Anna Smith (born 14 August 1988) is a British former professional tennis player.

She won one doubles title on the WTA Tour, as well as five singles and 29 doubles titles on the ITF Women's Circuit.

Smith, who specialised in doubles, was coached by Dave Sammel at TeamBath.

== Early and personal life ==
She was born in Redhill, Surrey, to Robert and Gunilla Smith and started playing tennis at the age of ten.

== Career ==
=== Junior (2003–2006) ===
Smith first competed as a junior in February 2003 and her last junior tournament was in June 2006 in the qualifying draw for the Wimbledon juniors. She had limited success as a singles player; she reached only one final (in April 2006 at the Sutton ITF junior tournament where she was beaten by Naomi Broady) and did not reach the quarterfinals in any other tournament she played.

She had significantly more success as a junior doubles competitor, winning three titles at the Donnybrook Junior International, the Wrexham and the Nottingham ITF event. She also reached two more finals, four semifinals and one quarterfinal.

Over the three years of her junior career, she reached a career-high combined ranking of world No. 665 and accumulated win–loss records of 8–13 in singles and 24–10 in doubles.

=== 2004–2007 ===
Smith played her first professional match in July 2004, courtesy of a wildcard into the qualifying draw of the $10k tournament in Felixstowe, England. Following two wins, she lost in the final round of qualifying to Lena Keothavong, the younger sister of top-100 player Anne Keothavong. Smith then lost in the qualifying stages of the $10k tournament in Manchester before going to Bolton and winning two matches to qualify for the $10k tournament held there. In her first main draw match of her career, she lost to a fellow British Elizabeth Thomas. She finished 2004 without a world ranking.

In April 2005, Smith lost in the final round of qualifying for the $10k in Porto Santo, Portugal, but was given a chance in the main draw as a lucky loser. She played well in this tournament before having to withdraw in the quarterfinals. August brought two more quarterfinal losses for Smith, the first in the $10k Wrexham tournament and the second in the $10k Nottingham tournament. The Wrexham event also saw her claim her first professional title as she won the doubles in partnership with Rebecca Llewellyn. Her final tournament of the year was the $10k event in Sunderland, where she also reached the quarterfinals. She finished 2005 ranked world No. 660.

April and May 2006 saw good form from Smith; in April, she reached the first ITF Circuit semifinal of her career in Bath, Somerset and the following month she reached the quarterfinals in Bournemouth. In August, she reached the first singles final of her career in Ilkley, not dropping a single set en route. She was beaten in the title match by Anna Fitzpatrick. Smith managed to reach the quarterfinals as a qualifier in her very next tournament ($10k Wrexham). In September, she won her first professional singles title at the $10k event in Nottingham beating compatriot Georgie Stoop in the final. The rest of the year saw limited success for Smith in singles, though she did win a doubles title in Redbridge with Anna Hawkins.

In March 2007, Smith reached the third singles final of her career at a $10k event in Hamilton, New Zealand, where she lost to Erika Sema. She got no more notable results until August that year when she hit another good patch, reaching the semifinal of the $10k event in London before losing to Martina Babáková. Smith and Babáková also won the doubles in London. In her next tournament, a $10k event in Nottingham, Smith reached the final which she lost to Pauline Wong. She then immediately followed this up by qualifying for and reaching the quarterfinals of the $25k event, also held in Nottingham. The rest of the year was spent on the ITF Circuit but she lost before the quarterfinals in every tournament. Her end-of-year ranking was world No. 449.

=== 2008 ===
2008 started disappointingly for Smith as she only managed to reach one ITF quarterfinal before entering the qualifying event for Wimbledon where she won one match (against Julie Coin of France) before losing in the second round. Later that year she won the second ITF title of her career, this time at the $10k event in London. She beat Rebecca Marino in the final. She then reached the semifinals in Limoges, France – another $10k event. In October, she reached the quarterfinals of a $50k home event in Barnstaple before losing to Lina Stančiūtė. Her year-end ranking was 373.

=== 2009 ===
In her new season she won only one match out of her first eleven, before going on to take the title in Felixstowe in July, beating Heather Watson in the semifinals and Tímea Babos in the final. In her next tournament, another $10k in Frinton, she again came up against Watson in the semifinals but was defeated in straight sets. After this she reached only one more quarterfinal for the rest of the year in Koksijde where she lost to Sofia Shapatava. By the end of 2009, her singles ranking had fallen to No. 441.

=== 2017 ===
Smith won her first WTA Tour title when she and Nicole Melichar beat Kirsten Flipkens and Johanna Larsson in the final of Nuremberg.

=== 2018 ===
In February, Smith was selected for the Fed Cup Europe/Africa Zone Group I matches in Estonia. Playing doubles with Katie Boulter, they won both of their dead pool rubbers against Estonia and Portugal. With Great Britain in the playoffs, Johanna Konta and Heather Watson won their singles matches against Hungary, Great Britain progressed to the World Group II Play-offs, and the doubles match was not played.

== WTA Tour finals ==
=== Doubles: 6 (1 title, 5 runner-ups) ===
Legend Grand Slam tournaments Premier M & Premier 5 Premier (0–1) International (1–4)	Finals by surface Hard (0–2) Grass (0–1) Clay (1–2) Carpet (0–0)

Result	W–L	Date	Tournament	Tier	Surface	Partner	Opponents	Score
Loss	0–1	Jul 2014	Bastad Open, Sweden	International	Clay	(United Kingdom) Jocelyn Rae	(Slovenia) Andreja Klepač (Spain) María Teresa Torró Flor	1–6, 1–6
Loss	0–2	Jun 2015	Nottingham Open, UK	International	Grass	(United Kingdom) Jocelyn Rae	(United States) Raquel Kops-Jones (United States) Abigail Spears	6–3, 3–6, [9–11]
Loss	0–3	Sep 2016	Japan Women's Open	International	Hard	(United Kingdom) Jocelyn Rae	(Japan) Shuko Aoyama (Japan) Makoto Ninomiya	3–6, 3–6
Win	1–3	May 2017	Nuremberg Cup, Germany	International	Clay	(United States) Nicole Melichar	(Belgium) Kirsten Flipkens (Sweden) Johanna Larsson	3–6, 6–3, [11–9]
Loss	1–4	Oct 2017	Kremlin Cup, Russia	Premier	Hard (i)	(United States) Nicole Melichar	(Hungary) Tímea Babos (Czech Republic) Andrea Hlaváčková	2–6, 6–3, [3–10]
Loss	1–5	Apr 2018	Istanbul Open, Turkey	International	Clay	(Switzerland) Xenia Knoll	(China) Liang Chen (China) Zhang Shuai	4–6, 4–6

== WTA Challenger finals ==
=== Doubles: 1 (runner-up) ===
Result	W–L	Date	Tournament	Surface	Partner	Opponents	Score
Loss	0–1	Nov 2016	Open de Limoges, France	Hard (i)	(Czech Republic) Renata Voráčová	(Belgium) Elise Mertens (Luxembourg) Mandy Minella	4–6, 4–6

== ITF Circuit finals ==
=== Singles: 10 (5 titles, 5 runner–ups) ===
Legend $50,000 tournaments $25,000 tournaments $10,000 tournaments	Finals by surface Hard (4–3) Clay (0–1) Grass (1–1)

Result	W–L	Date	Tournament	Tier	Surface	Opponent	Score
Loss	0–1	Aug 2006	ITF Ilkley, United Kingdom	10,000	Grass	(United Kingdom) Anna Fitzpatrick	4–6, 3–6
Win	1–1	Sep 2006	ITF Nottingham, UK	10,000	Hard	(United Kingdom) Georgie Gent	6–1, 6–4
Loss	1–2	Mar 2007	ITF Hamilton, New Zealand	10,000	Hard	(Japan) Erika Sema	3–6, 5–7
Loss	1–3	Sep 2007	ITF Nottingham, UK	10,000	Hard	(Netherlands) Pauline Wong	5–7, 2–6
Win	2–3	Aug 2008	ITF Cumberland, UK	10,000	Hard	(Canada) Rebecca Marino	6–3, 3–6, 7–5
Win	3–3	Jul 2009	ITF Felixstowe, UK	10,000	Grass	(Hungary) Tímea Babos	7–5, 3–6, 6–4
Loss	3–4	Mar 2010	ITF Jersey, UK	25,000	Hard (i)	(Sweden) Johanna Larsson	2–6, 3–6
Loss	3–5	May 2013	ITF Edinburgh, UK	10,000	Clay	(France) Laetitia Sarrazin	5–7, 7–6, 2–6
Win	4–5	Nov 2013	GB Pro-Series Loughborough, UK	10,000	Hard (i)	(Belgium) Klaartje Liebens	6–3, 7–5
Win	5–5	Mar 2014	ITF Heraklion, Greece	10,000	Hard	(Switzerland) Xenia Knoll	6–1, 6–3

=== Doubles: 45 (29 titles, 16 runner–ups) ===
Legend $100,000 tournaments $75,000 tournaments $50,000 tournaments $25,000 tournaments $15,000 tournaments $10,000 tournaments	Finals by surface Hard (28–11) Clay (0–5) Grass (1–0)

Outcome	No.	Date	Tournament	Surface	Partner	Opponents	Score
Winner	1.	3 August 2005	ITF Wrexham, United Kingdom	Hard	(United Kingdom) Rebecca Llewellyn	(India) Rushmi Chakravarthi (New Zealand) Paula Marama	6–3, 7–5
Runner-up	1.	6 April 2006	GB Pro-Series Bath, UK	Hard (i)	(United Kingdom) Melissa Berry	(United Kingdom) Lindsay Cox (United Kingdom) Anna Hawkins	3–6, 2–6
Winner	2.	8 November 2006	ITF Redbridge, United Kingdom	Hard (i)	(United Kingdom) Anna Hawkins	(United Kingdom) Holly Richards (United Kingdom) Elizabeth Thomas	6–3, 6–3
Runner-up	2.	7 May 2007	ITF Antalya, Turkey	Hard	(Brazil) Roxane Vaisemberg	(Germany) Korina Perkovic (Turkey) İpek Şenoğlu	6–7^{(1)}, 4–6
Winner	3.	23 August 2007	ITF Cumberland, United Kingdom	Hard	(Slovakia) Martina Babáková	(United Kingdom) Anna Hawkins (United Kingdom) Karen Paterson	6–2, 6–3
Winner	4.	16 January 2008	ITF Sunderland, United Kingdom	Hard (i)	(Sweden) Johanna Larsson	(Slovakia) Martina Babáková (Czech Republic) Iveta Gerlová	6–1, 3–6, [10–3]
Runner-up	3.	5 February 2008	ITF Sutton, United Kingdom	Hard (i)	(Sweden) Johanna Larsson	(Czech Republic) Andrea Hlaváčková (Czech Republic) Lucie Hradecká	3–6, 3–6
Winner	5.	12 February 2008	ITF Stockholm, Sweden	Hard (i)	(Sweden) Johanna Larsson	(Serbia) Neda Kozić (Croatia) Ivana Lisjak	6–0, 7–5
Winner	6.	23 September 2008	GB Pro-Series Shrewsbury, UK	Hard (i)	(Sweden) Johanna Larsson	(United Kingdom) Sarah Borwell (United States) Courtney Nagle	7–6^{(6)}, 6–4
Runner-up	4.	20 April 2009	ITF Bari, Italy	Clay	(Sweden) Johanna Larsson	(Ukraine) Irina Buryachok (Czech Republic) Renata Voráčová	7–5, 2–6, [5–10]
Runner-up	5.	10 August 2009	ITF Koksijde, Belgium	Clay	(Sweden) Johanna Larsson	(Australia) Shannon Golds (Australia) Nicole Kriz	6–7^{(3)}, 2–6
Runner-up	6.	22 September 2009	GB Pro-Series Shrewsbury, UK	Hard (i)	(Sweden) Johanna Larsson	(Germany) Kristina Barrois (Austria) Yvonne Meusburger	6–3, 4–6, [7–10]
Runner-up	7.	29 September 2009	ITF Helsinki, Finland	Hard (i)	(Sweden) Johanna Larsson	(Finland) Emma Laine (United Kingdom) Melanie South	3–6, 3–6
Winner	7.	7 October 2009	GB Pro-Series Barnstaple, UK	Hard (i)	(Sweden) Johanna Larsson	(South Africa) Kelly Anderson (Finland) Emma Laine	7–5, 6–4
Winner	8.	13 January 2010	GB Pro-Series Glasgow, UK	Hard (i)	(France) Victoria Larrière	(Italy) Nicole Clerico (Romania) Liana-Gabriela Ungur	6–4, 6–4
Runner-up	8.	2 February 2010	ITF Sutton, UK	Hard (i)	(United Kingdom) Naomi Cavaday	(Greece) Eirini Georgatou (Russia) Valeria Savinykh	5–7, 6–2, [8–10]
Winner	9.	27 March 2010	ITF Jersey, UK	Hard (i)	(Estonia) Maret Ani	(Australia) Jarmila Gajdošová (United Kingdom) Melanie South	7–5, 6–4
Winner	10.	10 July 2010	ITF Valladolid, Spain	Hard	(Austria) Melanie Klaffner	(Spain) Year Campos-Molina (Spain) Leticia Costas	6–3, 2–6, [10–7]
Winner	11.	31 July 2010	ITF Vigo, Spain	Hard	(France) Anaïs Laurendon	(Georgia (country)) Sofia Kvatsabaia (Germany) Justine Ozga	6–3, 6–1
Winner	12.	6 November 2010	Open Nantes Atlantique, France	Hard (i)	(United Kingdom) Anne Keothavong	(Bosnia and Herzegovina) Mervana Jugić-Salkić (Croatia) Darija Jurak	5–7, 6–1, [10–6]
Runner-up	9.	19 January 2013	GB Pro-Series Glasgow, UK	Hard (i)	(United Kingdom) Francesca Stephenson	(United Kingdom) Tara Moore (United Kingdom) Melanie South	6–7^{(5)}, 3–6
Runner-up	10.	4 May 2013	ITF Edinburgh, UK	Clay	(United Kingdom) Francesca Stephenson	(Estonia) Anett Kontaveit (United Kingdom) Jessica Ren	2–6, 3–6
Runner-up	11.	26 July 2013	ITF Wrexham, UK	Hard	(United Kingdom) Melanie South	(Japan) Kanae Hisami (Japan) Mari Tanaka	3–6, 6–7
Winner	13.	3 August 2013	ITF Nottingham, UK	Hard	(United Kingdom) Melanie South	(United Kingdom) Daneika Borthwick (United Kingdom) Anna Fitzpatrick	6–4, 6–2
Winner	14.	9 November 2013	GB Pro-Series Loughborough, UK	Hard (i)	(United Kingdom) Jocelyn Rae	(Italy) Francesca Palmigiano (Italy) Camilla Rosatello	6–0, 4–6, [10–3]
Winner	15.	15 November 2013	ITF Manchester, UK	Hard (i)	(United Kingdom) Jocelyn Rae	(Netherlands) Eva Wacanno (Germany) Julia Wachaczyk	6–1, 6–4
Runner-up	12.	6 December 2013	Pune Championships, India	Hard	(United Kingdom) Jocelyn Rae	(Thailand) Nicha Lertpitaksinchai (Thailand) Peangtarn Plipuech	5–7, 5–7
Winner	16.	13 December 2013	ITF Navi Mumbai, India	Hard	(United Kingdom) Jocelyn Rae	(Georgia (country)) Oksana Kalashnikova (Latvia) Diāna Marcinkēviča	6–4, 7–6^{(5)}
Winner	17.	18 January 2014	GB Pro-Series Glasgow, UK	Hard (i)	(United Kingdom) Jocelyn Rae	(Czech Republic) Martina Borecká (Czech Republic) Tereza Malíková	4–6, 6–2, [10–4]
Winner	18.	25 January 2014	ITF Sunderland, UK	Hard (i)	(United Kingdom) Jocelyn Rae	(Hungary) Ágnes Bukta (Bulgaria) Viktoriya Tomova	6–1, 6–1
Winner	19.	22 February 2014	Nottingham Trophy, UK	Hard (i)	(United Kingdom) Jocelyn Rae	(United Kingdom) Naomi Broady (Czech Republic) Renata Voráčová	7–6^{(6)}, 6–4
Runner-up	13.	28 February 2014	ITF Beinasco, Italy	Clay (i)	(United Kingdom) Jocelyn Rae	(Italy) Nicole Clerico (Italy) Giulia Gatto-Monticone	1–6, 7–5, [11–13]
Winner	20.	4 April 2014	ITF Edgbaston, UK	Hard (i)	(United Kingdom) Jocelyn Rae	(Poland) Magda Linette (Switzerland) Amra Sadiković	3–6, 7–5, [10–4]
Winner	21.	6 June 2014	Nottingham Trophy, UK	Grass	(United Kingdom) Jocelyn Rae	(Canada) Sharon Fichman (United States) Maria Sanchez	7–6^{(5)}, 4–6, [10–5]
Winner	22.	26 July 2014	Lexington Challenger, United States	Hard	(United Kingdom) Jocelyn Rae	(Japan) Shuko Aoyama (United States) Keri Wong	6–4, 6–4
Winner	23.	31 January 2015	ITF Sunderland, UK	Hard (i)	(United Kingdom) Jocelyn Rae	(Poland) Justyna Jegiołka (Sweden) Cornelia Lister	6–3, 6–1
Winner	24.	4 April 2015	ITF Croissy-Beaubourg, France	Hard (i)	(United Kingdom) Jocelyn Rae	(France) Julie Coin (France) Mathilde Johansson	7–6^{(5)}, 7–6^{(2)}
Runner-up	14.	10 May 2015	Open de Cagnes-sur-Mer, France	Clay	(United Kingdom) Jocelyn Rae	(United Kingdom) Johanna Konta (France) Laura Thorpe	6–1, 4–6, [5–10]
Runner-up	15.	4 June 2015	Eastbourne Trophy, UK	Grass	(United Kingdom) Jocelyn Rae	(United States) Shelby Rogers (United States) CoCo Vandeweghe	5–7, 6–7^{(1)}
Winner	25.	2 April 2016	ITF Croissy-Beaubourg, France	Hard (i)	(United Kingdom) Jocelyn Rae	(Czech Republic) Lenka Kunčíková (Czech Republic) Karolína Stuchlá	6–4, 6–1
Winner	26.	3 September 2016	ITF Guiyang, China	Hard (i)	(United Kingdom) Jocelyn Rae	(China) Wei Zhanlan (China) Zhao Qianqian	6–4, 3–6, [10–5]
Winner	27.	11 November 2016	ITF Bratislava, Slovakia	Hard (i)	(United Kingdom) Jocelyn Rae	(Netherlands) Quirine Lemoine (Netherlands) Eva Wacanno	6–3, 6–2
Winner	28.	4 February 2017	GB Pro-Series Glasgow, UK	Hard (i)	(United Kingdom) Jocelyn Rae	(Romania) Laura Ioana Andrei (Czech Republic) Petra Krejsová	6–3, 6–2
Runner-up	16.	20 May 2018	Empire Slovak Open, Slovakia	Clay	(Switzerland) Xenia Knoll	(Australia) Jessica Moore (Kazakhstan) Galina Voskoboeva	6–0, 3–6, [7–10]
Winner	29.	29 September 2019	ITF Roehampton, UK	Hard	(United Kingdom) Samantha Murray	(Germany) Sarah-Rebecca Sekulic (Germany) Julia Lohoff	6–4, 6–3

== Grand Slam performance timeline ==
=== Doubles ===
Key
W	F	SF	QF	#R	RR	Q#	P#	DNQ	A	Z#	PO	G	S	B	NMS	NTI	P	NH

(W) winner; (F) finalist; (SF) semifinalist; (QF) quarterfinalist; (#R) rounds 4, 3, 2, 1; (RR) round-robin stage; (Q#) qualification round; (P#) preliminary round; (DNQ) did not qualify; (A) absent; (Z#) Davis/Fed Cup Zonal Group (with number indication) or (PO) play-off; (G) gold, (S) silver or (B) bronze Olympic/Paralympic medal; (NMS) not a Masters tournament; (NTI) not a Tier I tournament; (P) postponed; (NH) not held; (SR) strike rate (events won / competed); (W–L) win–loss record.
To avoid confusion and double counting, these charts are updated at the conclusion of a tournament or when the player's participation has ended.

Tournament	2008	2009	2010	2011	2012	2013	2014	2015	2016	2017	2018	W–L
Australian Open	A	A	A	A	A	A	A	A	3R	1R	1R	2–3
French Open	A	A	A	A	A	A	A	A	2R	2R	1R	2–3
Wimbledon	1R	1R	1R	A	A	A	1R	2R	1R	1R	1R	1–8
US Open	A	A	A	A	A	A	A	1R	A	A	A	0–1
Win–loss	0–1	0–1	0–1	0–0	0–0	0–0	0–1	1–2	3–3	1–3	0–3	5–15

== Fed Cup participation ==
Great Britain Fed Cup team

=== Doubles (4–1) ===
Edition	Round	Date	Location	Against	Surface	Partner	Opponents	W/L	Score
2015 Fed Cup	Europe/Africa Zone; Group I	4 February 2015	Budapest, Hungary	Liechtenstein	Hard (i)	(United Kingdom) Jocelyn Rae	(Liechtenstein) Kathinka von Deichmann (Liechtenstein) Stephanie Vogt	W	6–1, 6–2
2015 Fed Cup	Europe/Africa Zone; Group I	5 February 2015	Budapest, Hungary	Turkey	Hard (i)	(United Kingdom) Jocelyn Rae	(Turkey) Başak Eraydın (Turkey) Pemra Özgen	W	6–2, 6–1
2015 Fed Cup	Europe/Africa Zone; Group I	6 February 2015	Budapest, Hungary	Ukraine	Hard (i)	(United Kingdom) Jocelyn Rae	(Ukraine) Kateryna Kozlova (Ukraine) Olga Savchuk	W	6–2, 6–1
2016 Fed Cup	Europe/Africa Zone; Group I	4 February 2016	Eilat, Israel	South Africa	Hard	(United Kingdom) Jocelyn Rae	(South Africa) Madrie Le Roux (South Africa) Michelle Sammons	W	6–3, 6–2
2016 Fed Cup	Europe/Africa Zone; Group I	5 February 2016	Eilat, Israel	(Georgia (country)) Georgia	Hard	(United Kingdom) Jocelyn Rae	(Georgia (country)) Oksana Kalashnikova (Georgia (country)) Sofia Shapatava	L	2–6, 4–6
