= Danish Open (tennis) =

Tournament information
- Founded: 2008
- Abolished: 2012
- Editions: 5
- Location: Copenhagen; Denmark
- Venue: Farum Arena
- Surface: Hard (i)
- Draw: 32S/32Q/16D
- Prize money: $220,000

The Danish Open (sponsored as the e-Boks Open) was a professional women's tennis tournament played 2010–12 on indoor hard courts in Farum, Denmark north of Copenhagen. The event was affiliated with the Women's Tennis Association (WTA), and is an International-level tournament on the WTA Tour. The tournament may be viewed as a continuation of the ITF event 2008 Nordea Danish Open in Odense. A plan to change surface to red clay in 2012, still played indoors in Farum, was dropped due to the cost.

The tournament was selected to be held in April until at least 2015, however on November 9, 2012, the event was cancelled from the 2013 WTA Tour and replaced by a new tournament Katowice Open held in Katowice, Poland.

== Past finals ==
=== Singles ===
Year	Champion	Runner-up	Score
2012	(Germany) Angelique Kerber	(Denmark) Caroline Wozniacki	6–4, 6–4
2011	(Denmark) Caroline Wozniacki (3)	(Czech Republic) Lucie Šafářová	6–1, 6–4
2010	(Denmark) Caroline Wozniacki (2)	(Czech Republic) Klára Zakopalová	6–2, 7–6^{(7–5)}
↑ WTA International event ↑
2009	Not Held		
2008	(Denmark) Caroline Wozniacki	(Sweden) Sofia Arvidsson	6–2, 6–1
↑ ITF 100K event ↑

=== Doubles ===
Year	Champions	Runners-up	Score
2012	(Japan) Kimiko Date-Krumm (Japan) Rika Fujiwara	(Sweden) Sofia Arvidsson (Estonia) Kaia Kanepi	6–2, 4–6, [10–5]
2011	(Sweden) Johanna Larsson (Germany) Jasmin Wöhr	(France) Kristina Mladenovic (Poland) Katarzyna Piter	6–3, 6–3
2010	(Germany) Julia Görges (Germany) Anna-Lena Grönefeld	(Russia) Vitalia Diatchenko (Belarus) Tatiana Poutchek	6–4, 6–4
↑ WTA International event ↑
2009	Not Held		
2008	(United Kingdom) Sarah Borwell (United States) Courtney Nagle	(Czech Republic) Gabriela Chmelinová (Bosnia and Herzegovina) Mervana Jugić-Salkić	6–4, 6–4
↑ ITF 100K event ↑
