= Malou Ejdesgaard =

Danish tennis player

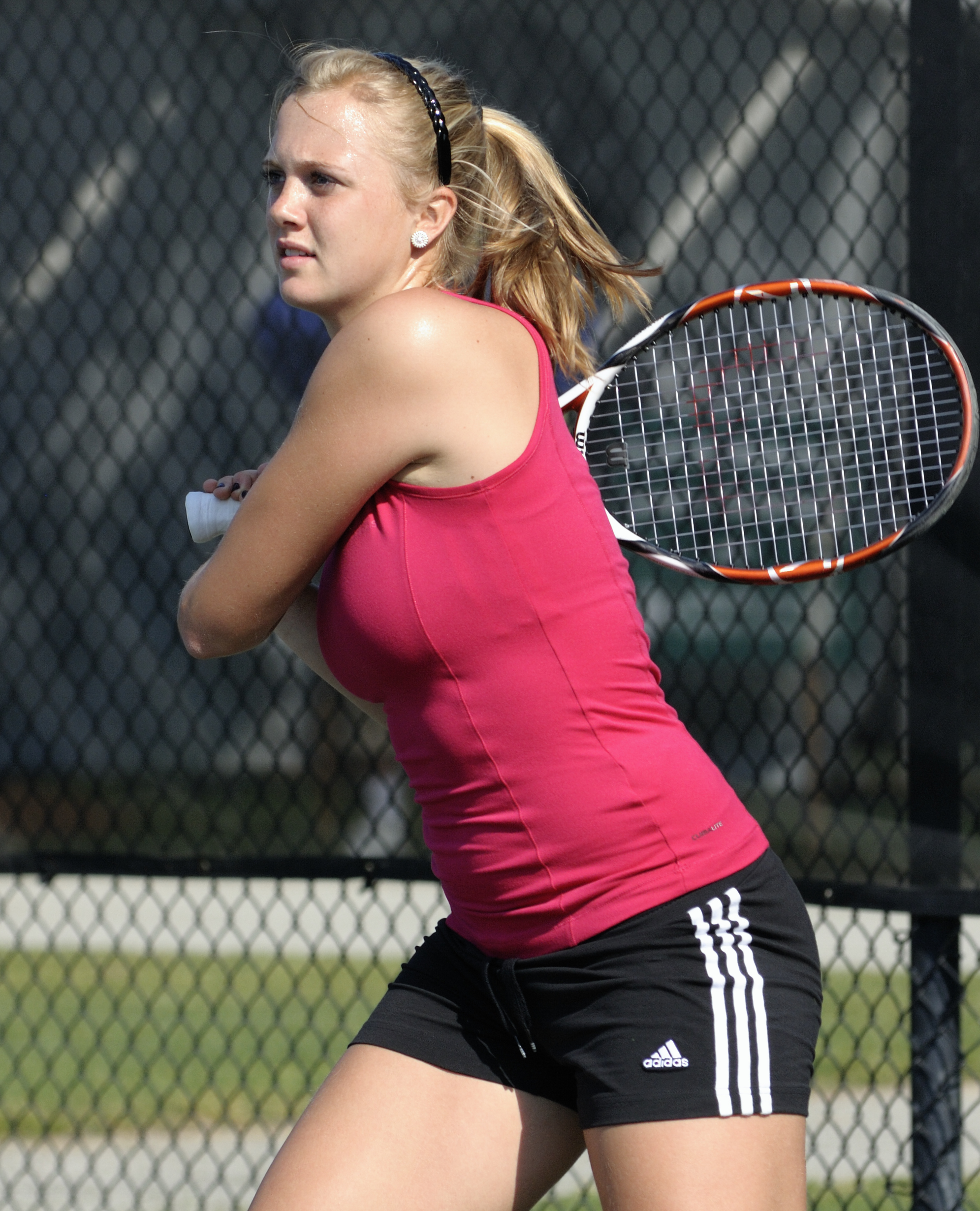
- Ejdesgaard at the 2010 WTA Charleston
- Country (sports): Denmark
- Residence: Copenhagen
- Born: 13 March 1991 (age 35) Copenhagen
- Turned pro: 2010
- Retired: 2014
- Plays: Right (two–handed backhand)
- Prize money: $33,761

Singles
- Career record: 35–74
- Career titles: 0
- Highest ranking: No. 717 (13 September 2010)

Doubles
- Career record: 91–86
- Career titles: 7 ITF
- Highest ranking: No. 252 (23 July 2012)

Team competitions
- Fed Cup: 3–8

Malou Ejdesgaard (born 13 March 1991) is a Danish former tennis player.

She was a member of the Denmark Fed Cup team from 2010 until just before her retirement in 2014.

== Professional career ==
Ejdesgaard made her WTA Tour debut playing the qualifying for the 2007 Nordic Light Open, but lost to domestic player Aleksandra Srdinović, 4–6, 4–6. In 2008, in the first round of qualifying at the China Open, she lost to Zhang Shuai, 1–6, 2–6.

She received a wildcard to play at the 2008 Danish Open and lost to Jasmina Tinjić in round one.

=== 2010 ===
In April 2010, Ejdesgaard lost in the first qualifying round of the MPS Group Championships to Arina Rodionova, 3–6, 6–7. She also failed to qualify for the Slovenia Open.

She made her professional singles debut at the WTA Tour event Danish Open, losing to Tatjana Malek in the first round, 0–6, 1–6.

Ejdesgaard won four $10k doubles tournaments in 2010. She suffered a season-ending knee injury in September, but made a full recovery and returned to playing tennis on the ITF Circuit in May 2011.

=== 2011 ===
Ejdesgaard received a wildcard to play at the Danish Open once again, but lost to Bethanie Mattek-Sands in round one.

She was most successful in doubles play on the ITF Circuit and won a number of doubles titles, including the events at Alcobaça and Valladolid.

=== 2012 ===
For the fourth time, she got a wildcard for the Danish Open, but was double-bageled by Alizé Cornet in the first round.

She reached the doubles final of the ITF event in Aschaffenburg with Réka Luca Jani, losing to Florencia Molinero and Stephanie Vogt.

=== 2014 ===
On 11 May, Ejdesgaard announced her retirement from the tour, saying she'd only play national and club games.

== Personal life ==
Ejdesgaard is a close friend of former world No. 1 tennis player Caroline Wozniacki, her Danish teammate, with whom she also plays some WTA Tour tournaments. They tried to gain an entry to the 2012 Summer Olympics in doubles. Ejdesgaard has played with Wozniacki in five tournaments – in 2008 at Odense, in 2010 at Ponte Vedra Beach, Charleston & Copenhagen, and in 2011 at Copenhagen. They lost in the first round and twice in the second round, respectively.

== ITF Circuit finals ==
$25,000 tournaments
$10,000 tournaments

=== Singles (0–1) ===
Result	No.	Date	Tournament	Surface	Opponent	Score
Loss	1.	2 July 2011	ITF Melilla, Spain	Hard (i)	(Spain) Rocio de la Torre-Sanchez	0–6, 1–6

=== Doubles (7–11) ===
Result	No.	Date	Tournament	Surface	Partner	Opponents	Score
Loss	1.	2 November 2008	ITF Stockholm, Sweden	Hard (i)	(Sweden) Anna Brazhnikova	(Norway) Helene Auensen (Norway) Ulrikke Eikeri	2–6, 6–4, [8–10]
Loss	2.	19 June 2009	ITF Gausdal, Norway	Hard	(Norway) Helene Auensen	(France) Victoria Larrière (Czech Republic) Zuzana Linhová	6–3, 4–6, [0–10]
Loss	3.	9 August 2009	ITF Savitaipale, Finland	Clay	(Israel) Ester Masuri	(Latvia) Diāna Marcinkēviča (Belarus) Anna Orlik	6–4, 2–6, [6–10]
Loss	4.	11 September 2009	ITF Rousse, Bulgaria	Clay	(Bulgaria) Dia Evtimova	(Romania) Ioana Gașpar (Romania) Simona Matei	1–6, 4–6
Loss	5.	14 November 2009	ITF Jersey, United Kingdom	Hard (i)	(Hungary) Tímea Babos	(Netherlands) Kiki Bertens (Netherlands) Daniëlle Harmsen	5–7, 5–7
Win	1.	17 January 2010	ITF Le Gosier, Guadeloupe	Hard	(France) Alizé Lim	(United States) Kayla Rizzolo (United States) Katie Ruckert	6–1, 5–7, [10–3]
Win	2.	20 March 2010	GB Pro-Series Bath, UK	Hard (i)	(Poland) Katarzyna Piter	(United Kingdom) Jade Curtis (United Kingdom) Anna Fitzpatrick	6–3, 6–2
Win	3.	25 June 2010	ITF Gausdal, Norway	Hard	(Czech Republic) Zuzana Linhová	(Russia) Karina Isayan (Russia) Anastasia Mukhametova	6–2, 6–3
Win	4.	3 September 2010	ITF Istanbul, Turkey	Hard	(Kyrgyzstan) Ksenia Palkina	(Belgium) Gally de Wael (Austria) Janina Toljan	6–4, 6–4
Loss	6.	20 May 2011	ITF Durban, South Africa	Hard (i)	(Austria) Nicole Rottmann	(United Kingdom) Jennifer Allan (South Africa) Surina De Beer	2–6, 6–4 [8–10]
Loss	7.	27 May 2011	ITF Durban, South Africa	Hard (i)	(Austria) Nicole Rottmann	(Czech Republic) Kateřina Kramperová (Czech Republic) Zuzana Linhová	3–6, 6–3 [8–10]
Win	5.	25 June 2011	ITF Alcobaça, Portugal	Hard	(Australia) Alenka Hubacek	(Ecuador) Mariana Correa (United States) Danielle Mills	6–2, 7–5
Loss	8.	1 July 2011	ITF Melilla, Spain	Hard (i)	(Australia) Alenka Hubacek	(Kazakhstan) Aselya Arginbayeva (Russia) Tanya Samodelok	6–1, 3–6 [7–10]
Win	6.	9 July 2011	ITF Valladolid, Spain	Hard	(France) Victoria Larrière	(Argentina) Vanesa Furlanetto (Argentina) Aranza Salut	6–0, 6–3
Loss	9.	12 November 2011	GB Pro-Series Loughborough, UK	Hard (i)	(United Kingdom) Amanda Elliott	(United Kingdom) Tara Moore (United Kingdom) Francesca Stephenson	6–3, 2–6, [3–10]
Loss	10.	15 July 2012	ITF Aschaffenburg, Germany	Clay	(Hungary) Réka Luca Jani	(Argentina) Florencia Molinero (Liechtenstein) Stephanie Vogt	3–6, 6–7^{(3)}
Win	7.	28 September 2012	ITF Madrid, Spain	Clay	(Bulgaria) Aleksandrina Naydenova	(Argentina) Tatiana Búa (Spain) Yvonne Cavallé Reimers	5–7, 6–3, [10–3]
Loss	11.	22 April 2013	ITF San Severo, Italy	Clay	(Denmark) Martine Ditlev	(Greece) Despina Papamichail (Italy) Giulia Sussarello	1–6, 4–6

== Team competition ==
=== Fed Cup ===
==== Singles ====
Edition	Round	Date	Against	Surface	Opponent	W/L	Result
2010 Europe/Africa Zone	SF	6 February 2010	Israel	Hard (i)	(Israel) Julia Glushko	Loss	6–4, 0–1 ret.

==== Doubles ====
Edition	Round	Date	Against	Surface	Partner	Opponents	W/L	Result
2010 Europe/ Africa Zone	RR	4 February	Hungary	Hard (i)	(Denmark) Karina-Ildor Jacobsgaard	(Hungary) Réka Luca Jani (Hungary) Zsófia Susányi	Win	3–6, 6–3, 6–1
2010 Europe/ Africa Zone	RR	5 February	Latvia	Hard (i)	(Denmark) Karina-Ildor Jacobsgaard	(Latvia) Līga Dekmeijere (Latvia) Irina Kuzmina	Loss	7–5, 4–6, 2–6
