= Johanna Larsson =

Swedish tennis player (born 1988)

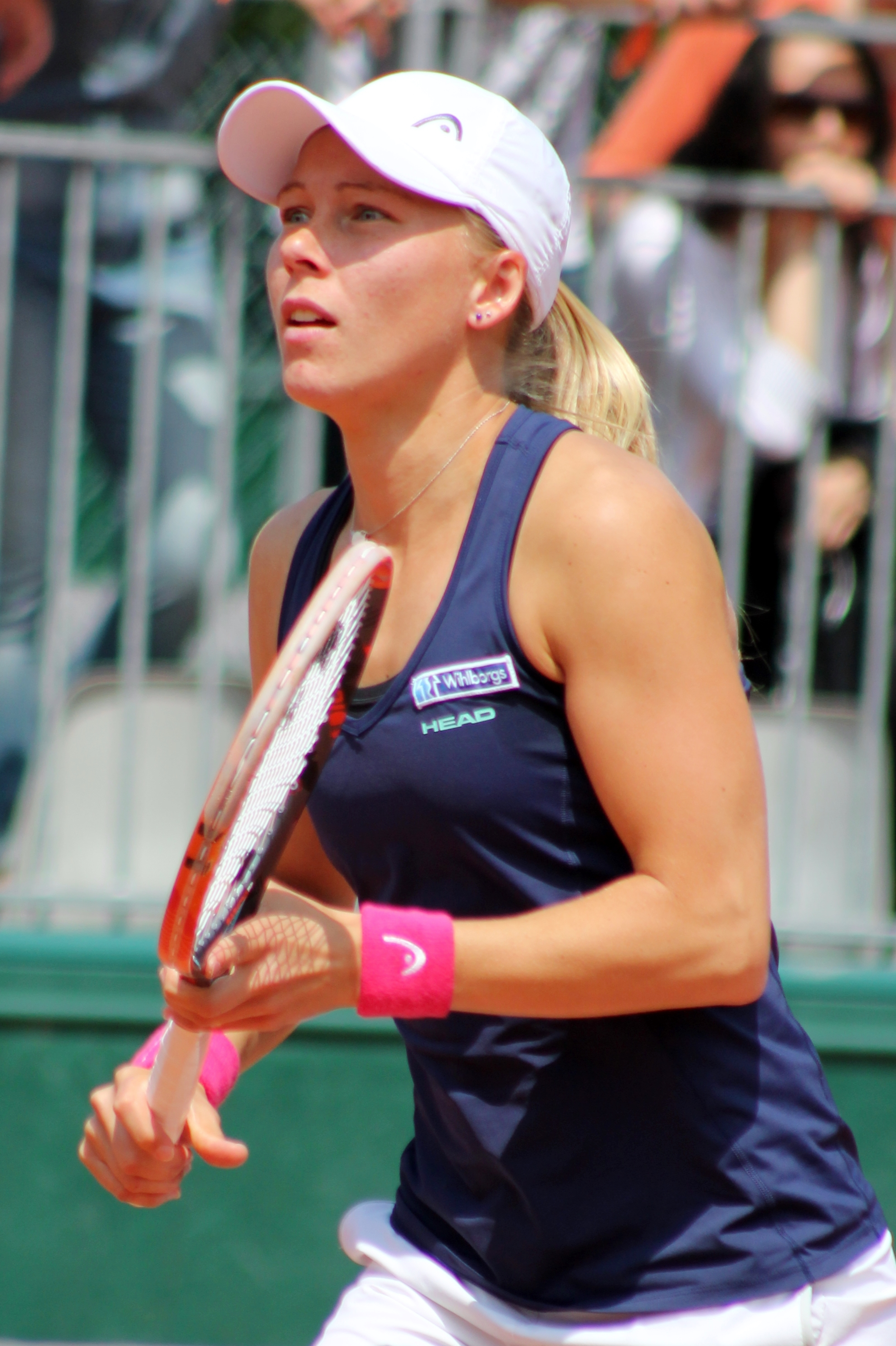
- Larsson at Roland Garros 2016
- Country (sports): Sweden
- Residence: Helsingborg, Sweden
- Born: 17 August 1988 (age 38) Boden, Sweden
- Height: 1.74 m (5 ft 9 in)
- Turned pro: 2006
- Retired: 2020
- Coach: Mattias Arvidsson
- Prize money: US$ 4,033,736

Singles
- Career record: 443–338
- Career titles: 2
- Highest ranking: No. 45 (19 September 2016)

Grand Slam singles results
- Australian Open: 2R (2015, 2016, 2019)
- French Open: 3R (2014)
- Wimbledon: 1R (2011, 2012, 2013, 2014, 2015, 2016, 2017, 2018)
- US Open: 3R (2014, 2016)

Doubles
- Career record: 300–184
- Career titles: 14
- Highest ranking: No. 20 (30 October 2017)

Grand Slam doubles results
- Australian Open: QF (2015)
- French Open: SF (2019)
- Wimbledon: 3R (2018)
- US Open: 3R (2015, 2017)

Other doubles tournaments
- Tour Finals: F (2017)

Grand Slam mixed doubles results
- Australian Open: QF (2018)
- Wimbledon: 3R (2018)

Team competitions
- Fed Cup: 52–33

Johanna Larsson (Swedish pronunciation: [ˈlɑ̌ːʂɔn]; born 17 August 1988) is a Swedish former tennis player. In her career, she won two singles and 14 doubles titles on the WTA Tour, with 13 singles and 17 doubles titles on the ITF Women's Circuit. Her career-high WTA rankings were 45 in singles, achieved on 19 September 2016, and 20 in doubles, set on 30 October 2017.

In 2017, Larsson qualified for the WTA Finals for the first time, with her partner Kiki Bertens, losing in the final of the event in Singapore to Tímea Babos and Andrea Hlaváčková. She made her debut for the Sweden Fed Cup team in 2005, eventually accumulating an overall win–loss record of 52–33.

== Career ==
=== 2005–2006: WTA Tour, Fed Cup debuts ===
Larsson began playing international tennis on the ITF Junior Circuit, with a career-high junior ranking at No. 79 in September 2006. During the Fed Cup in 2005, she made a significant career achievement when defeating Anna Kremer. Larsson went on to defeat Brenda Schultz-McCarthy and Joanna Sakowicz. She was awarded a wildcard entry for a WTA Tour event in Stockholm, defeating Kristina Barrois in three sets, before losing to Swedish No. 1, Sofia Arvidsson, in a close match. Towards the end of 2006, Larsson suffered an injured hamstring, made a comeback in early 2007, and played mainly in the U.S. She won a $10k title in Falkenberg in back to back seasons. She returned to Fed Cup in 2007, losing to Maša Zec Peškirič and beating Vojislava Lukić and Naomi Cavaday, both ranked in the top 300, giving Sweden ninth place.

=== 2008–2009: Grand Slam qualifyings, ITF tournament success ===
2008 was Larsson's breakthrough year, with wins in two $25k events in Stockholm and in Sutton. She also made her major debut at the 2008 French Open where she made the second qualifying round. She went on to make the second qualifying round at Wimbledon and the US Open final qualifying round. In September 2008, she also captured the $75k Shrewsbury doubles event. She ended the season playing Swedish team tennis for Helsingborg alongside Sofia Arvidsson.

Larsson began 2009 at the Australian Open, where she lost in the first qualifying round. She was included in the 2009 Swedish Fed Cup team, along with Sofia Arvidsson, Sandra Roma and Ellen Allgurin. She recorded a 3–1 singles win–loss record (including a win over top-70 player Monica Niculescu), and a 2–1 doubles win–loss ratio. After the Fed Cup, she travelled to South America to play qualifying in two WTA Tour events. In Bogotá, she had three wins in qualifying taking her into the main draw where she lost to Carla Suárez Navarro. In her next tournament in Acapulco, she was forced to retire with a knee injury while trailing top seed Ágnes Szávay one set down. A series of $25k clay tournaments saw Larsson reach two finals, a semi- and a quarterfinal. Sge took the singles and doubles titles at the $50k event in Barnstaple, her best singles result in her career until then. She then took another singles title at the $25k event in Glasgow. The following week, she made the final in Istanbul before losing to Maret Ani.

=== 2010: Major main-draw debut, WTA Tour doubles title, singles top 100 ===
2010 was Larsson's first top-100 season. She started the year playing two $25k events in the United States; in the first tournament in Plantation, she made the final knocking out top seed Maret Ani en route. She was beaten in the final by Ajla Tomljanović. In the second event in Lutz, she made the quarterfinals where she was defeated by Mariana Duque Mariño. She stayed unbeaten in singles and doubles throughout the four ties she played in Fed Cup, Sweden won promotion to the World Group II playoffs. Unseeded at the $50k tournament in Biberach, Larsson was the winner. She then captured her tenth ITF singles title in Clearwater, Florida.

Larsson made her major main-draw debut at French Open; in the first round, she defeated Anastasija Sevastova, before losing to Akgul Amanmuradova in the second. Following Roland Garros, she played the $100k Open de Marseille where she reached the final but lost to Klára Zakopalová. She won the doubles title with Yvonne Meusburger. Later, she fell in the first round of qualifying at Wimbledon.

Larsson then fell in the first round of the Swedish Open to Renata Voráčová. At the Prague Open, she reached her first WTA Tour quarterfinal after the withdrawal of top seed Lucie Šafářová in the second round, but fell to Barbora Záhlavová-Strýcová in the quarterfinals.

Larsson then continued her form at the Slovenia Open, as she defeated eighth-seeded Sofia Arvidsson in the first round and Maria Elena Camerin in the second. Then in the quarterfinals she caused a bigger upset, defeating third seed Anastasia Pavlyuchenkova and Ksenia Pervak to reach her first WTA Tour final. However, she lost to Anna Chakvetadze in straight sets. After this tournament, she reached a new career-high ranking of world No. 66. She competed in the İstanbul Cup and defeated eighth seed Patty Schnyder in the first round. In Quebec City, she won her first WTA Tour doubles title with Sofia Arvidsson.

=== 2011: Second career doubles title, maiden singles final ===
Larsson began 2011 with three consecutive losses in Auckland, Hobart and at the Australian Open. She also lost in the second round of a $25k event in Stockholm before an improvement in form saw her make it to the semifinals of the Abierto Mexicano. She defeated Li Na in the second round in Miami, before losing to Alexandra Dulgheru. In the lead up to the French Open, she made a semifinal appearance in Estoril losing to Kristina Barrois. She defeated former French Open Champion Ana Ivanovic in three sets at the French Open, but lost in the second round to Ekaterina Makarova.

Playing with Jasmin Wöhr, she won her second WTA Tour doubles title at the Danish Open defeating Kristina Mladenovic and Katarzyna Piter in the final.

At the Swedish Open, Larsson beat Alla Kudryavtseva in the first round. She then defeated Vera Dushevina and Lourdes Domínguez Lino, winning both matches in three sets. In the semifinals, she easily beat Sofia Arvidsson to advance to her second WTA Tour final, which she lost to eighth seed Polona Hercog, in straight sets. She repeated her Wimbledon result, losing in the first round of the US Open.

=== 2012–2013: Second Swedish Open final ===
Larsson lost in the first round of her opening three events in 2011. She posted a 3–6 win–loss record between the tournaments of Memphis and Estoril. Her first quarterfinal of the year occurred in Strasbourg where she lost to Francesca Schiavone. A second quarterfinal was recorded two tournaments later, this time in Bad Gastein. Following a first-round exit at Wimbledon, Larsson took a wildcard into a $100k event. She defeated the fourth, sixth and third seeds en route to taking the title. Larsson then reached the semifinals of the 2012 Swedish Open in Båstad, losing to Mathilde Johansson. In the run up to the US Open, in Cincinnati, Larsson recorded a win over world No. 11 Marion Bartoli, before losing to Li Na. In the final major of the year she faced Dominika Cibulková, but despite taking the first set on a tie-break she went on to lose in three sets. She ended the year playing mostly qualifying in WTA events in Asia.

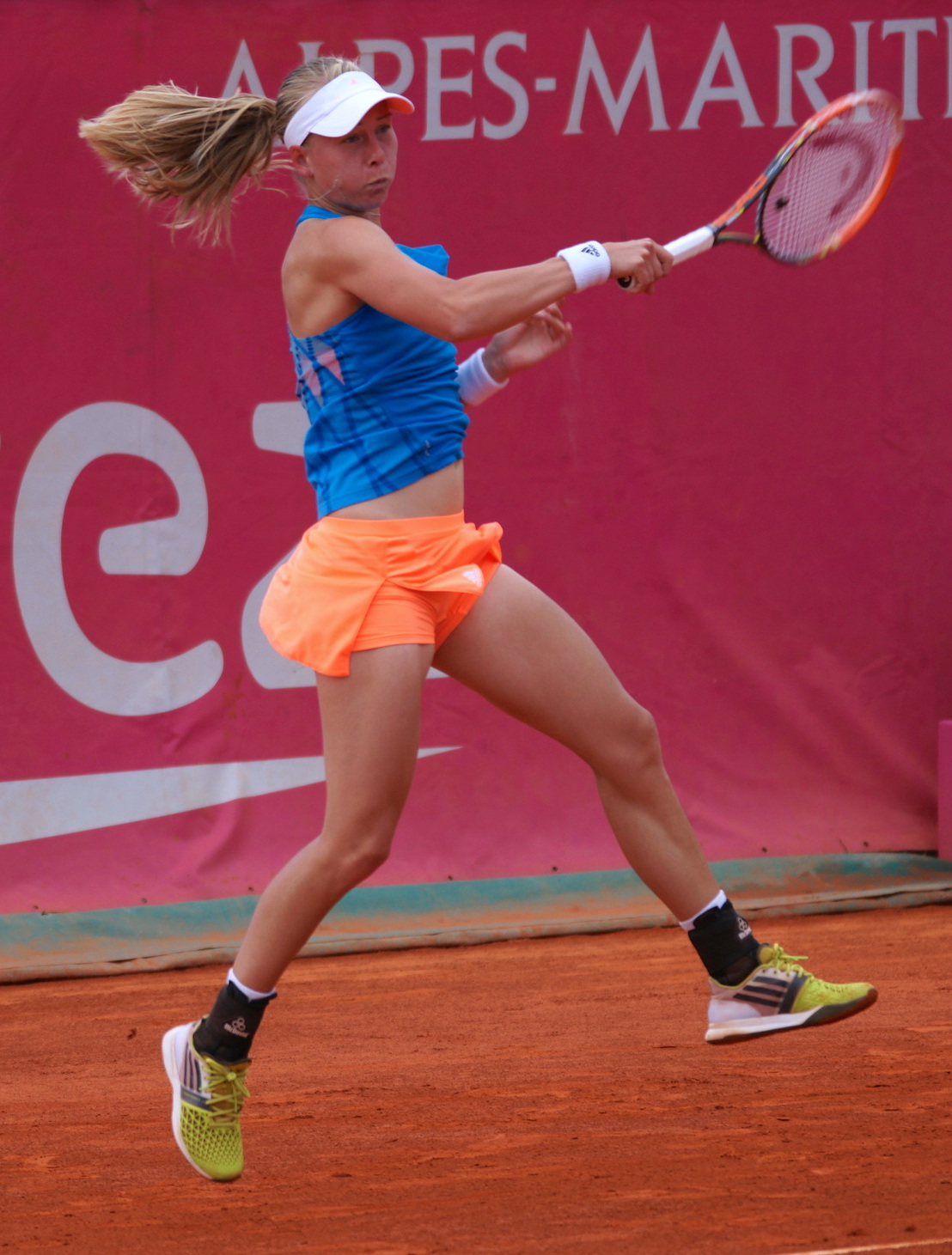
Johanna Larsson at the 2014 Open de Cagnes-sur-Mer

Larsson began the 2013 season with a quarterfinal appearance in Auckland, beating Julia Görges in the second round. She lost in the opening major of the season to Jelena Janković. She lost in two consecutive first rounds in Memphis and Acapulco. She reached the third round at Indian Wells, after defeating 24th-ranked Anastasia Pavlyuchenkova in the second round. She struggled in the lead-up to the French Open but made the quarterfinals in Strasbourg once again. She lost to Sorana Cîrstea in the second round of the French Open. After the French Open, Larsson struggled once again; she went on to exit Wimbledon in the first round. A major improvement in form saw Larsson beat Mathilde Johansson in Båstad, to reach her second final there. Larsson made it to the final of the women's singles at the Swedish Open where she lost to top seed Serena Williams in straight sets. In the lead-up to the US Open, she lost in qualifying in three U.S. hardcourt events. She lost in the second round of the US Open for the second year in a row. In the WTA Challenger event in Ningbo, Larsson made the semifinals, losing to Bojana Jovanovski. She ended the year with a loss to country-woman Arvidsson at the ITF event in Poitiers.

=== 2014–2015: First WTA Tour singles title ===
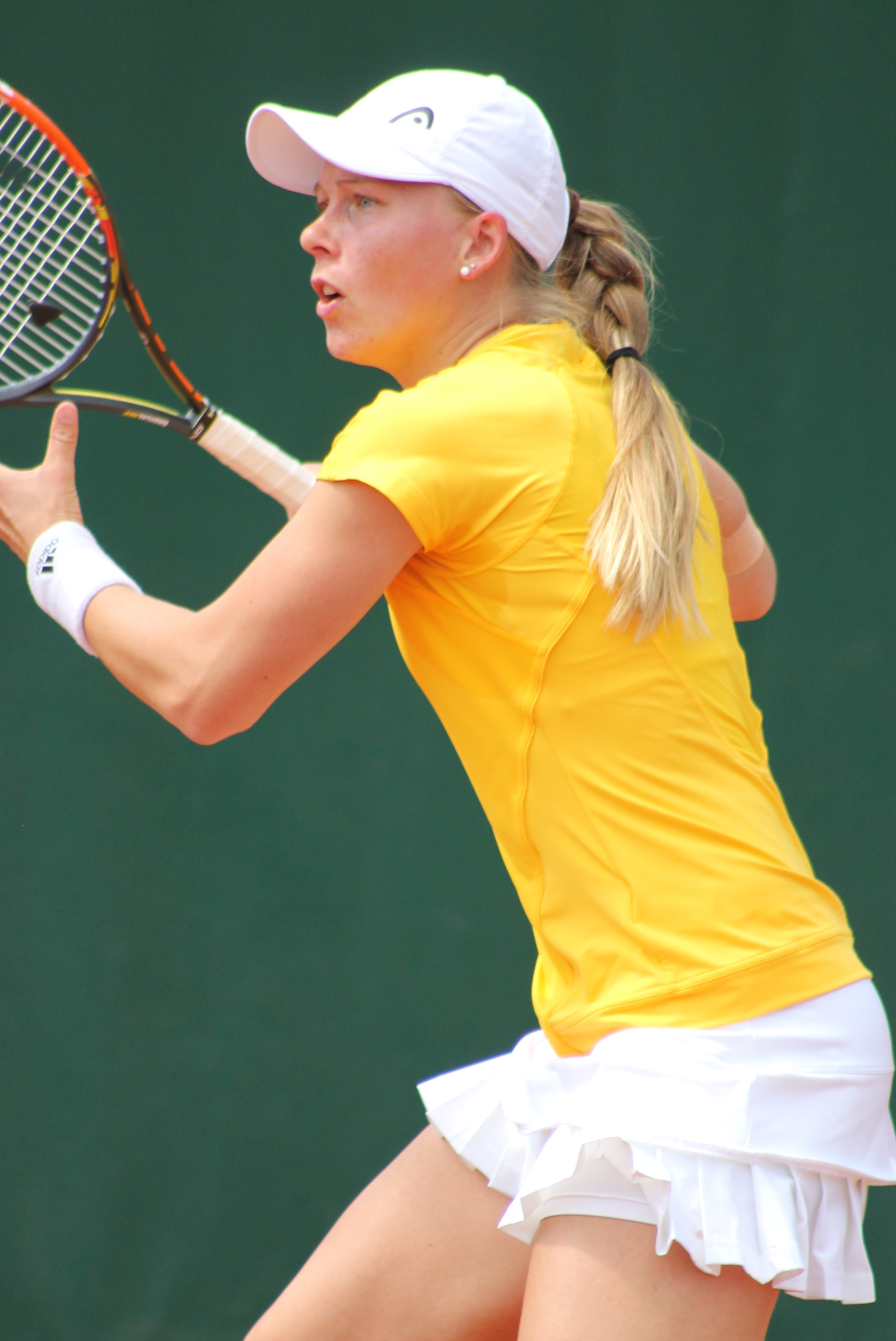
Larsson, 2015

Larsson began 2014 with a second-round finish in Auckland, losing to second seed Ana Ivanovic. She lost in the first round of 2014 Australian Open to Victoria Azarenka. She then had her best ever indoor result at a WTA Tour event when she qualified and made the second round in Paris. Two first-round losses occurred in Rio and Florianpolis. Her drop in ranking meant she played qualifying in both Indian Wells and Miami; she failed to qualify in either event. She made a quarterfinal appearance at the ITF event in Osprey, and took her 16th ITF doubles title with Kiki Bertens at Cagnes-sur-Mer.

At the 2015 Hobart International, Larsson teamed up with Kiki Bertens to win the doubles title, defeating defending champions Monica Niculescu and Klára Koukalová in the final.

Larsson won her first WTA Tour singles title at the 2015 Swedish Open, overcoming Mona Barthel in the championship match. Alongside Kiki Bertens, she also claimed the doubles title, defeating Tatjana Maria and Olga Savchuk in the final.

=== 2016–2017: Eight tour doubles titles ===
Larsson won eight WTA Tour doubles titles across 2016 and 2017, seven with Kiki Bertens at the 2016 Nuremberg Cup, 2016 Linz Open, 2016 Luxembourg Open, 2017 Auckland Open, 2017 Swiss Open, 2017 Korea Open, and 2017 Linz Open, and one with Kirsten Flipkens at the 2016 Korea Open.

Alongside Bertens, she reached the doubles final at the 2017 WTA Tour Finals in Singapore, losing to Tímea Babos and Andrea Hlaváčková in a deciding champions' tiebreak.

=== 2018–2020: Second singles title, French Open doubles semifinal, retirement ===
Larsson won her second WTA Tour singles title at the 2018 Nuremberg Cup, defeating Alison Riske in the final.

In October 2018, she won the doubles title at the Linz Open for the third successive year, pairing up with Kirsten Flipkens to overcome Raquel Atawo and Anna-Lena Grönefeld in the final.

Seeded 15th, Larsson and Flipkens reached the doubles semifinals at the 2019 French Open, losing to Duan Yingying and Zheng Saisai.

Larsson claimed her 14th, and final, WTA Tour doubles trophy at the 2019 Mallorca Open, combining with Kirsten Flipkens to see off María José Martínez Sánchez and Sara Sorribes Tormo in straight sets in the championship match.

On 28 February 2020, having last played in a Fed Cup match for Sweden against Poland earlier that month, Larsson announced her retirement from tennis aged 31. She stated her "energy is not really there to play at 100%" and added that she was "extremely happy and proud" of what she had achieved in tennis, describing her career as "a great journey with many wonderful moments."

== Career statistics ==
=== Grand Slam singles performance timeline ===
Key
W	F	SF	QF	#R	RR	Q#	DNQ	A	NH

(W) winner; (F) finalist; (SF) semifinalist; (QF) quarterfinalist; (#R) rounds 4, 3, 2, 1; (RR) round-robin stage; (Q#) qualification round; (DNQ) did not qualify; (A) absent; (NH) not held; (SR) strike rate (events won / competed); (W–L) win–loss record.

Tournament	2008	2009	2010	2011	2012	2013	2014	2015	2016	2017	2018	2019	2020	W–L	Win %
Australian Open	A	Q1	A	1R	1R	1R	1R	2R	2R	A	1R	2R	1R	3–9	25%
French Open	Q2	A	2R	2R	1R	2R	3R	1R	2R	2R	1R	2R	RT	8–10	44%
Wimbledon	Q2	A	Q1	1R	1R	1R	1R	1R	1R	1R	1R	Q1	NH	0–8	0%
US Open	Q3	A	1R	1R	1R	1R	3R	1R	3R	1R	2R	1R	RT	5–10	33%
Win–loss	0–0	0–0	1–2	1–4	0–4	1–4	4–4	1–4	4–4	1–3	1–4	2–3	0–1	16–37	30%
