= Caroline Wozniacki career statistics =

Career finals
Discipline	Type	Won	Lost	Total
Singles	Grand Slam	1	2	3
Singles	Summer Olympics	–	–	–
Singles	Year-end championships	1	1	2
Singles	Tournament of Champions	–	1	1
Singles	WTA Premier Mandatory & 5	6	6	12
Singles	WTA Tour (Note: Includes WTA Premier and WTA International tournaments. The WTA Tier II tournaments were reclassified as WTA Premier tournaments in 2009, while the WTA Tier III tournaments, WTA Tier IV tournaments and WTA Tier V tournaments were reclassified as WTA International tournaments the same year .)	22	15	37
Singles	Total	30	25	55
Doubles	Grand Slam	–	–	–
Doubles	Summer Olympics	–	–	–
Doubles	Year-end championships	–	–	–
Doubles	WTA Premier Mandatory & 5	–	–	–
Doubles	WTA Tour	2	2	4
Doubles	Total	2	2	4
Total		32	27	59

This is a list of the main career statistics of Danish tennis player Caroline Wozniacki. She won 30 singles titles including a Grand Slam and a WTA Finals title, three Premier Mandatory and three Premier 5 tournaments. She was the winner of the 2018 Australian Open and the 2017 WTA Finals, and the runner-up at the 2009 US Open, the 2010 WTA Tour Championships, and the 2014 US Open. She also reached another 25 singles finals, and won two doubles titles. Wozniacki was first ranked world No. 1 by the WTA on 11 October 2010.

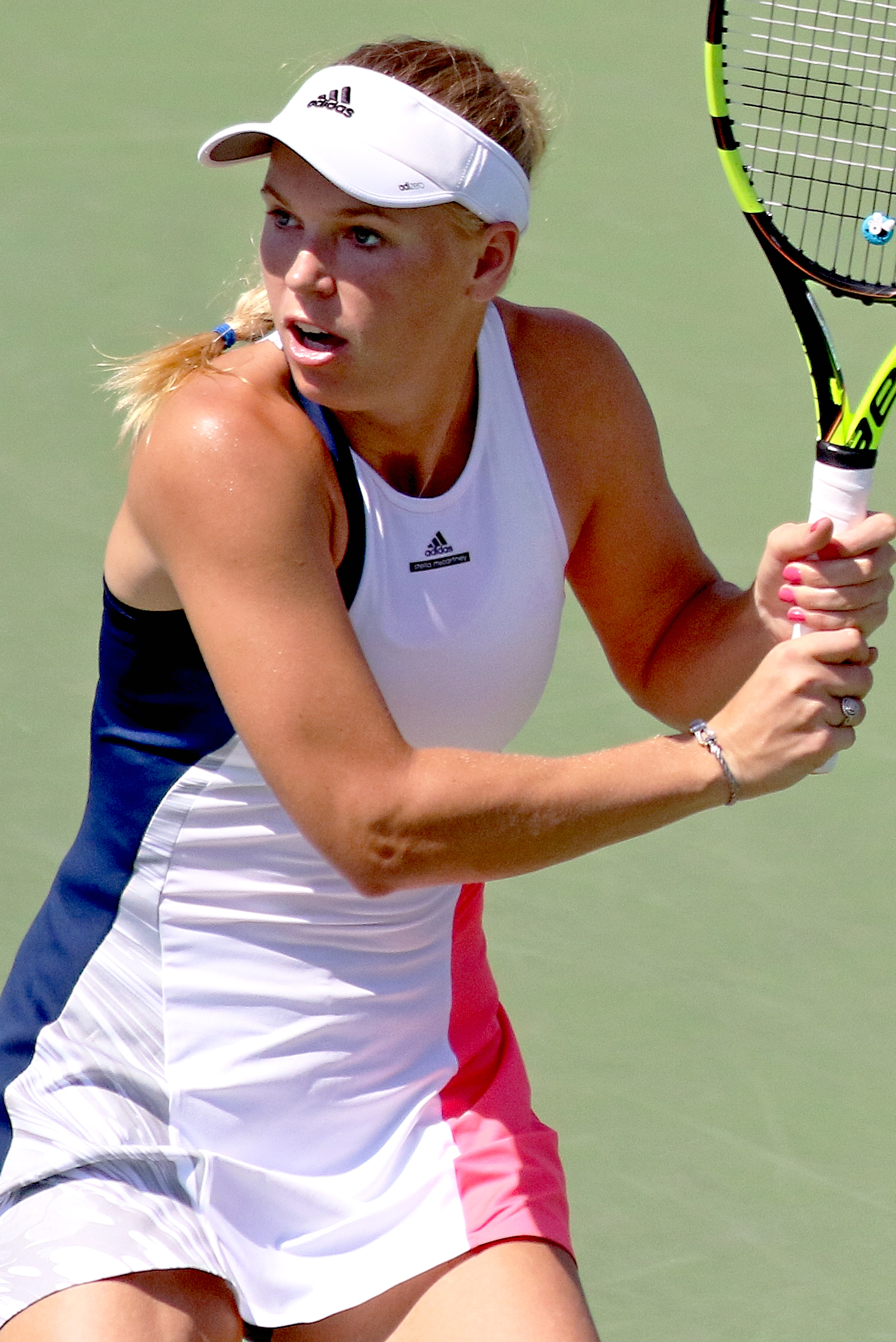
Wozniacki at the 2016 US Open.

== Performance timelines ==
Key
W	F	SF	QF	#R	RR	Q#	P#	DNQ	A	Z#	PO	G	S	B	NMS	NTI	P	NH

(W) winner; (F) finalist; (SF) semifinalist; (QF) quarterfinalist; (#R) rounds 4, 3, 2, 1; (RR) round-robin stage; (Q#) qualification round; (P#) preliminary round; (DNQ) did not qualify; (A) absent; (Z#) Davis/Fed Cup Zonal Group (with number indication) or (PO) play-off; (G) gold, (S) silver or (B) bronze Olympic/Paralympic medal; (NMS) not a Masters tournament; (NTI) not a Tier I tournament; (P) postponed; (NH) not held; (SR) strike rate (events won / competed); (W–L) win–loss record.
To avoid confusion and double counting, these charts are updated at the conclusion of a tournament or when the player's participation has ended.

Only main-draw results in WTA Tour, Grand Slam tournaments and Olympic Games are included in win–loss records.

=== Singles ===
Current through the 2024 US Open.

Tournament	2005	2006	2007	2008	2009	2010	2011	2012	2013	2014	2015	2016	2017	2018	2019	2020	...	2023	2024	SR	W–L	Win %
Grand Slam tournaments
Australian Open	A	A	A	4R	3R	4R	SF	QF	4R	3R	2R	1R	3R	W	3R	3R		A	2R	1 / 14	37–13	74%
French Open	A	A	1R	3R	3R	QF	3R	3R	2R	1R	2R	A	QF	4R	1R	A		A	A	0 / 12	21–12	64%
Wimbledon	A	Q1	2R	3R	4R	4R	4R	1R	2R	4R	4R	1R	4R	2R	3R	NH		A	3R	0 / 14	27–14	66%
US Open	A	A	2R	4R	F	SF	SF	1R	3R	F	2R	SF	2R	2R	3R	A		4R	4R	0 / 15	44–15	75%
Win–loss	0–0	0–0	2–3	10–4	13–4	15–4	15–4	6–4	7–4	11–4	6–4	5–3	10–4	12–3	6–4	2–1		3–1	6–3	1 / 55	129–54	70%
Year-end championships
WTA Finals (Note: Formerly known as WTA Tour Championships until 2014.)	DNQ				SF	F	RR	DNQ		SF	DNQ		W	RR	DNQ			DNQ		1 / 6	14–10	58%
WTA Elite Trophy (Note: WTA Tournament of Champions was held from 2009 to 2014, when WTA Elite Trophy replaced it.)	NH				A	A	A	F	A	A	RR	A	A	A	DNQ			DNQ	NH	0 / 2	5–2	71%
National representation
Summer Olympics	NH			3R	NH			QF	NH			2R	NH					NH	2R	0 / 4	7–4	64%
Billie Jean King Cup (Note: Formerly known as Fed Cup until 2020.)	Z1	Z1	Z1	Z1	Z1	Z1	Z1	A	A	A	Z3	A	A	A	A	A		A	Z1	0 / 0	17–6	74%
WTA 1000 + former Tier I tournaments
Dubai / Qatar Open (Note: The first Premier 5 event of the year has switched back and forth between the Dubai Tennis Championships and the Qatar Ladies Open since 2009. Dubai was classified as a Premier 5 event from 2009 to 2011 before being succeeded by Doha for the 2012–2014 period. In 2015, Dubai regained its Premier 5 status while Doha was demoted to Premier status. The two tournaments have since alternated status every year. In 2024, both tournaments were WTA 1000 events.)	NTI			QF	A	3R	W	2R	QF	2R	SF	3R	F	SF	A	A		A	A	1 / 10	25–9	74%
Indian Wells Open	A	A	2R	4R	QF	F	W	4R	F	4R	3R	2R	QF	4R	2R	NH		A	QF	1 / 14	36–13	73%
Miami Open	A	A	A	4R	QF	QF	4R	SF	3R	QF	4R	3R	F	2R	4R	NH		A	2R	0 / 13	30–13	70%
Madrid Open	NH				F	2R	3R	3R	1R	2R	QF	A	2R	3R	1R	NH		A	1R	0 / 11	17–11	61%
Italian Open	A	A	A	3R	3R	3R	SF	2R	1R	A	2R	A	A	QF	1R	A		A	A	0 / 9	10–9	53%
Canadian Open	A	A	1R	A	2R	W	2R	SF	2R	QF	2R	A	F	2R	2R	NH		2R	A	1 / 12	17–11	61%
Cincinnati Open	NTI				QF	3R	2R	3R	QF	SF	2R	A	QF	2R	1R	A		1R	2R	0 / 12	14–13	52%
Pan Pac. / Wuhan Open (Note: In 2014, the Pan Pacific Open was downgraded to a Premier event and replaced by the Wuhan Open.)	A	A	A	1R	2R	W	3R	QF	SF	SF	2R	3R	2R	3R	1R	NH		NH	A	1 / 11	16–10	62%
China Open	NTI				1R	W	QF	3R	QF	2R	3R	3R	3R	W	SF	NH		A	A	2 / 10	28–9	76%
Kremlin Cup	A	A	A	2R	NTI															0 / 1	1–1	50%
German Open	A	A	A	2R	NTI/NH															0 / 1	1–1	50%
Career statistics
	2005	2006	2007	2008	2009	2010	2011	2012	2013	2014	2015	2016	2017	2018	2019	2020	...	2023	2024	SR	W–L	Win %
Tournaments	2	4	15	23	26	22	22	23	23	20	24	20	23	19	15	2		3	13	Career total: 299		
Titles	0	0	0	3	3	6	6	2	1	1	1	2	2	3	0	0		0	0	Career total: 30		
Finals	0	0	0	4	8	8	8	4	2	3	3	2	8	4	1	0		0	0	Career total: 55		
Hard win–loss	0–2	4–4	8–10	42–13	36–17	44–9	40–11	42–14	33–14	42–15	26–17	31–13	41–13	26–12	12–9	5–2		4–3	10–7	24 / 206	446–185	71%
Clay win–loss	0–0	0–0	3–4	7–5	23–6	15–6	20–5	5–4	2–6	1–2	7–4	0–0	12–6	9–4	4–4	0–0		0–0	2–3	4 / 63	110–59	65%
Grass win–loss	0–0	0–0	1–1	4–2	8–1	3–2	3–1	3–3	4–2	6–2	6–2	3–4	7–2	6–1	4–2	0–0		0–0	4–3	2 / 30	62–28	69%
Overall win–loss	0–2	4–4	12–15	53–20	67–24	62–17	63–17	50–21	39–22	49–19	39–23	34–17	60–21	41–17	20–15	5–2		4–3	16–13	30 / 299	618–272	69%
Win%	0%	50%	44%	73%	74%	78%	79%	70%	64%	72%	63%	67%	74%	71%	57%	71%		57%	55%	Career total: 69%		
Year-end ranking	–	237	64	12	4	1	1	10	10	8	17	19	3	3	37	–		236	70	$36,116,868		

=== Doubles ===
Tournament	2007	2008	2009	2010	SR	W–L	Win %
Grand Slam
Australian Open	A	2R	1R	1R	0 / 3	1–3	25%
French Open	A	1R	1R	2R	0 / 3	1–3	25%
Wimbledon	A	1R	2R	2R	0 / 3	2–3	40%
US Open	1R	2R	3R	2R	0 / 4	4–4	50%
Win–loss	0–1	2–4	3–4	3–4	0 / 13	8–13	38%

=== Team ===
Tournament	2005	2006	2007	2008	2009	2010	2011	...	2015	...	2024	W–L	Win%
Billie Jean King Cup
Europe/Africa Zone Group I	13th	5th	11th	9th	7th	11th	14th		NP		4th	17–12	59%
Europe/Africa Zone Group III	not participating								1st		NP	3–0	100%
Win–loss	3–2	2–1	3–2	2–1	2–1	2–1	3–3		3–0		0–1	20–12	63%

== Grand Slam tournament finals ==
=== Singles: 3 (1 title, 2 runner-ups) ===
Result	Year	Championship	Surface	Opponent	Score
Loss	2009	US Open	Hard	(Belgium) Kim Clijsters	5–7, 3–6
Loss	2014	US Open	Hard	(United States) Serena Williams	3–6, 3–6
Win	2018	Australian Open	Hard	(Romania) Simona Halep	7–6^{(7–2)}, 3–6, 6–4

== Other significant finals ==
=== Year-end championships ===
==== Singles: 2 (1 title, 1 runner-up) ====
Result	Year	Location	Surface	Opponent	Score
Loss	2010	Doha, Qatar	Hard	(Belgium) Kim Clijsters	3–6, 7–5, 3–6
Win	2017	Singapore	Hard (i)	(United States) Venus Williams	6–4, 6–4

=== Premier Mandatory & Premier 5 tournaments ===
==== Singles: 12 (6 titles, 6 runner-ups) ====
Result	Year	Tournament	Surface	Opponent	Score
Loss	2009	Madrid Open	Clay	(Russia) Dinara Safina	2–6, 4–6
Loss	2010	Indian Wells Open	Hard	(Serbia) Jelena Janković	2–6, 4–6
Win	2010	Canadian Open	Hard	(Russia) Vera Zvonareva	6–3, 6–2
Win	2010	Pan Pacific Open	Hard	(Russia) Elena Dementieva	1–6, 6–2, 6–3
Win	2010	China Open	Hard	(Russia) Vera Zvonareva	6–3, 3–6, 6–3
Win	2011	Dubai Championships	Hard	(Russia) Svetlana Kuznetsova	6–1, 6–3
Win	2011	Indian Wells Open	Hard	(France) Marion Bartoli	6–1, 2–6, 6–3
Loss	2013	Indian Wells Open	Hard	(Russia) Maria Sharapova	2–6, 2–6
Loss	2017	Dubai Championships	Hard	(Ukraine) Elina Svitolina	4–6, 2–6
Loss	2017	Miami Open	Hard	(United Kingdom) Johanna Konta	4–6, 3–6
Loss	2017	Canadian Open	Hard	(Ukraine) Elina Svitolina	4–6, 0–6
Win	2018	China Open (2)	Hard	(Latvia) Anastasija Sevastova	6–3, 6–3

== WTA Tour finals ==
=== Singles: 55 (30 titles, 25 runner-ups) ===
Legend Grand Slam (1–2) WTA Finals (1–1) WTA Elite Trophy (0–1) Premier M & 5 (6–6) Premier (11–8) International (11–7)	Finals by surface Hard (24–17) Grass (2–1) Clay (4–7) Carpet (0–0)	Finals by setting Outdoors (25–19) Indoors (5–6)

Result	W–L	Date	Tournament	Tier	Surface	Opponent	Score
Win	1–0	Aug 2008	Nordic Light Open, Sweden	Tier IV	Hard	(Russia) Vera Dushevina	6–0, 6–2
Win	2–0	Aug 2008	Connecticut Open, United States	Tier II	Hard	(Russia) Anna Chakvetadze	3–6, 6–4, 6–1
Win	3–0	Oct 2008	Japan Open, Japan	Tier III	Hard	(Estonia) Kaia Kanepi	6–2, 3–6, 6–1
Loss	3–1	Oct 2008	Luxembourg Open, Luxembourg	Tier III	Hard (i)	(Russia) Elena Dementieva	6–2, 4–6, 6–7^{(4–7)}
Loss	3–2	Feb 2009	National Indoors, United States	International	Hard (i)	(Belarus) Victoria Azarenka	1–6, 3–6
Win	4–2	Apr 2009	Amelia Island Championships, United States	International	Clay	(Canada) Aleksandra Wozniak	6–1, 6–2
Loss	4–3	Apr 2009	Charleston Open, United States	Premier	Clay	(Germany) Sabine Lisicki	2–6, 4–6
Loss	4–4	May 2009	Madrid Open, Spain	Premier M	Clay	(Russia) Dinara Safina	2–6, 4–6
Win	5–4	Jun 2009	Eastbourne International, United Kingdom	Premier	Grass	(France) Virginie Razzano	7–6^{(7–5)}, 7–5
Loss	5–5	Jul 2009	Swedish Open, Sweden	International	Clay	(Spain) María José Martínez Sánchez	5–7, 4–6
Win	6–5	Aug 2009	Connecticut Open, United States (2)	Premier	Hard	(Russia) Elena Vesnina	6–2, 6–4
Loss	6–6	Sep 2009	US Open, United States	Grand Slam	Hard	(Belgium) Kim Clijsters	5–7, 3–6
Loss	6–7	Mar 2010	Indian Wells Open, United States	Premier M	Hard	(Serbia) Jelena Janković	2–6, 4–6
Win	7–7	Apr 2010	Amelia Island Championships, United States (2)	International	Clay	(Belarus) Olga Govortsova	6–2, 7–5
Win	8–7	Aug 2010	Danish Open, Denmark	International	Hard (i)	(Czech Republic) Klára Zakopalová	6–2, 7–6^{(7–5)}
Win	9–7	Aug 2010	Canadian Open, Canada	Premier 5	Hard	(Russia) Vera Zvonareva	6–3, 6–2
Win	10–7	Aug 2010	Connecticut Open, United States (3)	Premier	Hard	(Russia) Nadia Petrova	6–3, 3–6, 6–3
Win	11–7	Oct 2010	Pan Pacific Open, Japan	Premier 5	Hard	(Russia) Elena Dementieva	1–6, 6–2, 6–3
Win	12–7	Oct 2010	China Open, China	Premier M	Hard	(Russia) Vera Zvonareva	6–3, 3–6, 6–3
Loss	12–8	Oct 2010	WTA Finals, Qatar	Finals	Hard	(Belgium) Kim Clijsters	3–6, 7–5, 3–6
Win	13–8	Feb 2011	Dubai Championships, United Arab Emirates	Premier 5	Hard	(Russia) Svetlana Kuznetsova	6–1, 6–3
Loss	13–9	Feb 2011	Qatar Ladies Open, Qatar	Premier	Hard	(Russia) Vera Zvonareva	4–6, 4–6
Win	14–9	Mar 2011	Indian Wells Open, United States	Premier M	Hard	(France) Marion Bartoli	6–1, 2–6, 6–3
Win	15–9	Apr 2011	Charleston Open, United States	Premier	Clay	(Russia) Elena Vesnina	6–2, 6–3
Loss	15–10	Apr 2011	Stuttgart Open, Germany	Premier	Clay (i)	(Germany) Julia Görges	6–7^{(3–7)}, 3–6
Win	16–10	May 2011	Brussels Open, Belgium	Premier	Clay	(China) Peng Shuai	2–6, 6–3, 6–3
Win	17–10	Jun 2011	Danish Open, Denmark (2)	International	Hard (i)	(Czech Republic) Lucie Šafářová	6–1, 6–4
Win	18–10	Aug 2011	Connecticut Open, United States (4)	Premier	Hard	(Czech Republic) Petra Cetkovská	6–4, 6–1
Loss	18–11	Apr 2012	Danish Open, Denmark	International	Hard (i)	(Germany) Angelique Kerber	4–6, 4–6
Win	19–11	Sep 2012	Korea Open, South Korea	International	Hard	(Estonia) Kaia Kanepi	6–1, 6–0
Win	20–11	Oct 2012	Kremlin Cup, Russia	Premier	Hard (i)	(Australia) Samantha Stosur	6–2, 4–6, 7–5
Loss	20–12	Nov 2012	Tournament of Champions, Bulgaria	Elite Trophy	Hard (i)	(Russia) Nadia Petrova	2–6, 1–6
Loss	20–13	Mar 2013	Indian Wells Open, United States	Premier M	Hard	(Russia) Maria Sharapova	2–6, 2–6
Win	21–13	Oct 2013	Luxembourg Open, Luxembourg	International	Hard (i)	(Germany) Annika Beck	6–2, 6–2
Win	22–13	Jul 2014	İstanbul Cup, Turkey	International	Hard	(Italy) Roberta Vinci	6–1, 6–1
Loss	22–14	Sep 2014	US Open, United States	Grand Slam	Hard	(United States) Serena Williams	3–6, 3–6
Loss	22–15	Sep 2014	Pan Pacific Open, Japan	Premier	Hard	(Serbia) Ana Ivanovic	2–6, 6–7^{(2–7)}
Loss	22–16	Jan 2015	Auckland Open, New Zealand	International	Hard	(United States) Venus Williams	6–2, 3–6, 3–6
Win	23–16	Mar 2015	Malaysian Open, Malaysia	International	Hard	(Romania) Alexandra Dulgheru	4–6, 6–2, 6–1
Loss	23–17	Apr 2015	Stuttgart Open, Germany	Premier	Clay (i)	(Germany) Angelique Kerber	6–3, 1–6, 5–7
Win	24–17	Sep 2016	Pan Pacific Open, Japan (2)	Premier	Hard	(Japan) Naomi Osaka	7–5, 6–3
Win	25–17	Oct 2016	Hong Kong Open, China	International	Hard	(France) Kristina Mladenovic	6–1, 6–7^{(4–7)}, 6–2
Loss	25–18	Feb 2017	Qatar Open, Qatar	Premier	Hard	(Czech Republic) Karolína Plíšková	3–6, 4–6
Loss	25–19	Feb 2017	Dubai Championships, United Arab Emirates	Premier 5	Hard	(Ukraine) Elina Svitolina	4–6, 2–6
Loss	25–20	Apr 2017	Miami Open, United States	Premier M	Hard	(United Kingdom) Johanna Konta	4–6, 3–6
Loss	25–21	Jul 2017	Eastbourne International, United Kingdom	Premier	Grass	(Czech Republic) Karolína Plíšková	4–6, 4–6
Loss	25–22	Jul 2017	Swedish Open, Sweden	International	Clay	(Czech Republic) Kateřina Siniaková	3–6, 4–6
Loss	25–23	Aug 2017	Canadian Open, Canada	Premier 5	Hard	(Ukraine) Elina Svitolina	4–6, 0–6
Win	26–23	Sep 2017	Pan Pacific Open, Japan (3)	Premier	Hard	(Russia) Anastasia Pavlyuchenkova	6–0, 7–5
Win	27–23	Oct 2017	WTA Finals, Singapore	Finals	Hard (i)	(United States) Venus Williams	6–4, 6–4
Loss	27–24	Jan 2018	Auckland Open, New Zealand	International	Hard	(Germany) Julia Görges	4–6, 6–7^{(4–7)}
Win	28–24	Jan 2018	Australian Open, Australia	Grand Slam	Hard	(Romania) Simona Halep	7–6^{(7–2)}, 3–6, 6–4
Win	29–24	Jun 2018	Eastbourne International, United Kingdom (2)	Premier	Grass	(Belarus) Aryna Sabalenka	7–5, 7–6^{(7–5)}
Win	30–24	Oct 2018	China Open, China (2)	Premier M	Hard	(Latvia) Anastasija Sevastova	6–3, 6–3
Loss	30–25	Apr 2019	Charleston Open, United States	Premier	Clay	(United States) Madison Keys	6–7^{(5–7)}, 3–6

=== Doubles: 4 (2 titles, 2 runner-ups) ===
Legend Grand Slam Premier M & 5 Premier (1–0) International (1–2)	Finals by surface Hard (2–2) Grass (0–0) Clay (0–0) Carpet (0–0)	Finals by setting Outdoors (1–1) Indoors (1–1)

Result	W–L	Date	Tournament	Tier	Surface	Partner	Opponents	Score
Loss	0–1	Feb 2006	National Indoors, United States	Tier III	Hard (i)	(Belarus) Victoria Azarenka	(United States) Lisa Raymond (Australia) Samantha Stosur	6–7^{(2–7)}, 3–6
Win	1–1	Sep 2008	China Open, China	Tier II	Hard	(Spain) Anabel Medina Garrigues	(China) Han Xinyun (China) Xu Yifan	6–1, 6–3
Win	2–1	Feb 2009	National Indoors, United States	International	Hard (i)	(Belarus) Victoria Azarenka	(Ukraine) Yuliana Fedak (Netherlands) Michaëlla Krajicek	6–1, 7–6^{(7–2)}
Loss	2–2	Jan 2020	Auckland Open, New Zealand	International	Hard	(United States) Serena Williams	(United States) Asia Muhammad (United States) Taylor Townsend	4–6, 4–6

== ITF Circuit finals ==
=== Singles: 6 (4 titles, 2 runner–ups) ===
Legend $100,000 tournaments (1–0) $75,000 tournaments (2–0) $50,000 tournaments (0–1) $25,000 tournaments (1–1)	Finals by surface Hard (2–0) Clay (0–2) Carpet (2–0)	Finals by setting Outdoors (1–2) Indoors (3–0)

Result	W–L	Date	Tournament	Tier	Surface	Opponent	Score
Loss	0–1	Apr 2006	ITF Civitavecchia, Italy	25,000	Clay	(Germany) Martina Müller	1–6, 1–6
Win	1–1	Oct 2006	ITF Istanbul, Turkey	25,000	Hard (i)	(Germany) Tatjana Maria	6–2, 6–1
Win	2–1	Feb 2007	ITF Ortisei, Italy	75,000	Carpet (i)	(Italy) Alberta Brianti	4–6, 7–5, 6–3
Win	3–1	Mar 2007	Las Vegas Open, United States	75,000	Hard	(Japan) Akiko Morigami	6–3, 6–2
Loss	3–2	Apr 2007	ITF Latina, Italy	50,000	Clay	(Austria) Yvonne Meusburger	5–7, 6–4, 3–6
Win	4–2	Nov 2008	Danish Open, Denmark	100,000	Carpet (i)	(Sweden) Sofia Arvidsson	6–2, 6–1

=== Junior Grand Slam finals ===
==== Singles: 2 (1 title, 1 runner-up) ====
Result	Year	Championship	Surface	Opponent	Score
Loss	2006	Australian Open	Hard	(Russia) Anastasia Pavlyuchenkova	6–1, 2–6, 3–6
Win	2006	Wimbledon	Grass	(Slovakia) Magdaléna Rybáriková	3–6, 6–1, 6–3

== Fed Cup participation ==
=== Singles: 22 (17–5) ===
Edition	Round	Date	Location	Against	Surface	Opponent	W/L	Score
2005	Z1 RR	Apr 2005	Antalya (TUR)	Serbia and Montenegro	Clay	Ana Jovanović	L	6–4, 6–7^{(5–7)}, 4–6
2005	Z1 RR	Apr 2005	Antalya (TUR)	(United Kingdom) Great Britain	Clay	Anne Keothavong	L	3–6, 6–4, 2–6
2005	Z1 RR	Apr 2005	Antalya (TUR)	Slovenia	Clay	Tina Križan	W	6–4, 6–0
2005	Z1 PO	Apr 2005	Antalya (TUR)	Greece	Clay	Anna Koumantou	W	4–6, 6–1, 6–3
2006	Z1 RR	Apr 2006	Plovdiv (BUL)	South Africa	Clay	Alicia Pillay	W	6–2, 6–0
2006	Z1 RR	Apr 2006	Plovdiv (BUL)	Slovenia	Clay	Maša Zec-Peškirič	W	6–4, 6–7^{(1–7)}, 7–5
2006	Z1 RR	Apr 2006	Plovdiv (BUL)	Serbia and Montenegro	Clay	Ana Ivanovic	L	3–6, 0–6
2007	Z1 RR	Apr 2007	Plovdiv (BUL)	Switzerland	Clay	Patty Schnyder	L	6–7^{(5–7)}, 1–6
2007	Z1 RR	Apr 2007	Plovdiv (BUL)	Netherlands	Clay	Elise Tamaëla	W	6–2, 6–1
2007	Z1 RR	Apr 2007	Plovdiv (BUL)	Romania	Clay	Raluca Olaru	W	6–1, 6–4
2008	Z1 RR	Feb 2008	Budapest (HUN)	Switzerland	Carpet (i)	Patty Schnyder	L	1–6, 6–7^{(6–8)}
2008	Z1 RR	Feb 2008	Budapest (HUN)	(United Kingdom) Great Britain	Carpet (i)	Katie O'Brien	W	6–2, 1–6, 6–2
2009	Z1 RR	Feb 2009	Tallinn (EST)	Belarus	Hard (i)	Victoria Azarenka	W	6–3, 6–3
2009	Z1 RR	Feb 2009	Tallinn (EST)	Austria	Hard (i)	Patricia Mayr	W	6–2, 6–1
2010	Z1 RR	Feb 2010	Lisbon (POR)	Sweden	Hard (i)	Sofia Arvidsson	W	6–3, 6–1
2010	Z1 RR	Feb 2010	Lisbon (POR)	Latvia	Hard (i)	Anastasija Sevastova	W	6–2, 6–2
2011	Z1 RR	Feb 2011	Eilat (ISR)	Switzerland	Hard	Patty Schnyder	W	6–3, 6–3
2011	Z1 RR	Feb 2011	Eilat (ISR)	(United Kingdom) Great Britain	Hard	Anne Keothavong	W	6–0, 6–2
2011	Z1 PO	Feb 2011	Eilat (ISR)	Greece	Hard	Eleni Daniilidou	W	6–0, 6–3
2015	Z3 RR	Apr 2015	Ulcinj (MNE)	Algeria	Clay	Inès Ibbou	W	6–2, 6–1
2015	Z3 RR	Apr 2015	Ulcinj (MNE)	Norway	Clay	Melanie Stokke	W	6–3, 6–2
2015	Z3 PO	Apr 2015	Ulcinj (MNE)	Greece	Clay	Maria Sakkari	W	6–3, 6–0

=== Doubles: 9 (3–6) ===
Edition	Round	Date	Venue	Partnering	Against	Surface	Opponents	W/L	Result
2005	Z1 PO	Apr 2005	Antalya (TUR)	Hanne Skak Jensen	Greece	Clay	Asimina Kaplani; Anna Koumantou	W	7–6^{(7–5)}, 6–4
2007	Z1 RR	Apr 2007	Plovdiv (BUL)	Eva Dyrberg	Netherlands	Clay	Elise Tamaëla; Nicole Thijssen	W	4–6, 6–3, 6–4
2007	Z1 RR	Apr 2007	Plovdiv (BUL)	Eva Dyrberg	Romania	Clay	Mădălina Gojnea; Monica Niculescu	L	4–6, 5–7
2008	Z1 RR	Feb 2008	Budapest (HUN)	Eva Dyrberg	(United Kingdom) Great Britain	Carpet (i)	Elena Baltacha; Anne Keothavong	W	6–3, 6–2
2009	Z1 RR	Feb 2009	Tallinn (EST)	Eva Dyrberg	Belarus	Hard (i)	Victoria Azarenka; Olga Govortsova	L	0–6, 4–6
2010	Z1 RR	Feb 2010	Lisbon (POR)	Karina-Ildor Jacobsgaard	Sweden	Hard (i)	Sofia Arvidsson; Johanna Larsson	L	0–6, 0–6
2011	Z1 RR	Feb 2011	Eilat (ISR)	Mai Grage	Switzerland	Hard	Timea Bacsinszky; Patty Schnyder	L	3–6, 2–6
2011	Z1 RR	Feb 2011	Eilat (ISR)	Mai Grage	(United Kingdom) Great Britain	Hard	Jocelyn Rae; Heather Watson	L	7–5, 5–7, 5–7
2011	Z1 PO	Feb 2011	Eilat (ISR)	Mai Grage	Greece	Hard	Eleni Daniilidou; Eirini Georgatou	L	2–6, 5–7

== WTA Tour career earnings ==
Wozniacki earned more than 35 million dollars during her career.

Year	Grand Slam singles titles	WTA singles titles	Total singles titles	Earnings ($)	Money list rank
2007	0	0	0	151,895	100
2008	0	3	3	686,327	23
2009	0	3	3	2,371,550	6
2010	0	6	6	4,446,488	2
2011	0	6	6	4,065,581	2
2012	0	2	2	2,408,670	7
2013	0	1	1	1,779,418	12
2014	0	1	1	3,372,350	6
2015	0	1	1	1,354,338	24
2016	0	2	2	1,408,973	24
2017	0	2	2	4,748,518	4
2018	1	2	3	6,657,719	2
2019	0	0	0	1,726,002	23
Career	1	29	30	35,218,415	4

== Career Grand Slam statistics ==
=== Seedings ===
The tournaments won by Wozniacki are in boldface, and advanced into finals by Wozniacki are in italics.

Season	Australian Open	French Open	Wimbledon Championships	US Open
2006	absent	absent	did not qualify	absent
2007	absent	not seeded	wildcard	not seeded
2008	not seeded	30th	31st	21st
2009	11th	10th	9th	9th (1)
2010	4th	3rd	3rd	1st
2011	1st	1st	1st	1st
2012	1st	9th	7th	8th
2013	10th	10th	9th	6th
2014	10th	13th	16th	10th (2)
2015	8th	5th	5th	4th
2016	16th	absent	not seeded	not seeded
2017	17th	11th	5th	5th
2018	**2nd (1)**	2nd	2nd	2nd
2019	3rd	13th	14th	19th
2020	not seeded	absent	not held	absent
2021	absent	absent	absent	absent
2022	absent	absent	absent	absent
2023	absent	absent	absent	wildcard
2024	wildcard	absent	wildcard	not seeded

=== Best Grand Slam tournament results details ===
Grand Slam winners are in boldface, and runner–ups are in italics

Australian Open
2018 Australian Open (2nd seed)
Round	Opponent	Rank	Score
1R	(Romania) Mihaela Buzărnescu	44	6–2, 6–3
2R	(Croatia) Jana Fett	119	3–6, 6–2, 7–5
3R	(Netherlands) Kiki Bertens (30)	32	6–4, 6–3
4R	(Slovakia) Magdaléna Rybáriková (19)	21	6–3, 6–0
QF	(Spain) Carla Suárez Navarro	39	6–0, 6–7^{(3–7)}, 6–2
SF	(Belgium) Elise Mertens	37	6–3, 7–6^{(7–2)}
**W**	(Romania) Simona Halep (1)	**1**	7–6^{(7–2)}, 3–6, 6–4

Wimbledon Championships
2009 Wimbledon (9th seed)
Round	Opponent	Rank	Score
1R	(Japan) Kimiko Date (WC)	142	5–7, 6–3, 6–1
2R	(Russia) Maria Kirilenko	59	6–0, 6–4
3R	(Spain) Anabel Medina Garrigues (20)	20	6–2, 6–2
4R	(Germany) Sabine Lisicki	41	4–6, 4–6
2010 Wimbledon (3rd seed)
Round	Opponent	Rank	Score
1R	(Italy) Tathiana Garbin	53	6–1, 6–1
2R	(Chinese Taipei) Chang Kai-chen	89	6–4, 6–3
3R	(Russia) Anastasia Pavlyuchenkova (29)	32	7–5, 6–4
4R	(Czech Republic) Petra Kvitová	62	2–6, 0–6
2011 Wimbledon (1st seed)
Round	Opponent	Rank	Score
1R	(Spain) Arantxa Parra Santonja	105	6–2, 6–1
2R	(France) Virginie Razzano	96	6–1, 6–3
3R	(Australia) Jarmila Gajdošová (27)	28	6–3, 6–2
4R	(Slovakia) Dominika Cibulková (24)	24	6–1, 6–7^{(5–7)}, 5–7
2014 Wimbledon (16th seed)
Round	Opponent	Rank	Score
1R	(Israel) Shahar Pe'er	78	6–3, 6–0
2R	(United Kingdom) Naomi Broady (WC)	163	6–3, 6–2
3R	(Croatia) Ana Konjuh (Q)	189	6–3, 6–0
4R	(Czech Republic) Barbora Záhlavová-Strýcová	43	2–6, 5–7
2015 Wimbledon (5th seed)
Round	Opponent	Rank	Score
1R	(China) Zheng Saisai	66	7–5, 6–0
2R	(Czech Republic) Denisa Allertová	83	6–1, 7–6^{(8–6)}
3R	(Italy) Camila Giorgi (31)	32	6–2, 6–2
4R	(Spain) Garbiñe Muguruza (20)	20	4–6, 4–6
2017 Wimbledon (5th seed)
Round	Opponent	Rank	Score
1R	(Hungary) Tímea Babos	42	6–4, 4–6, 6–1
2R	(Bulgaria) Tsvetana Pironkova	131	6–3, 6–4
3R	(Estonia) Anett Kontaveit	38	3–6, 7–6^{(7–3)}, 6–2
4R	(United States) CoCo Vandeweghe (24)	25	6–7^{(4–7)}, 4–6

French Open
2010 French Open (3rd seed)
Round	Opponent	Rank	Score
1R	(Russia) Alla Kudryavtseva	78	6–0, 6–3
2R	(Italy) Tathiana Garbin	56	6–3, 6–1
3R	(Romania) Alexandra Dulgheru (31)	32	6–3, 6–4
4R	(Italy) Flavia Pennetta (14)	15	7–6^{(7–5)}, 6–7^{(4–7)}, 6–2
QF	(Italy) **Francesca Schiavone** (17)	17	2–6, 3–6
2017 French Open (11th seed)
Round	Opponent	Rank	Score
1R	(Australia) Jaimee Fourlis (WC)	337	6–4, 3–6, 6–2
2R	(Canada) Françoise Abanda (Q)	195	6–0, 6–0
3R	(United States) CiCi Bellis	48	6–2, 2–6, 6–3
4R	(Russia) Svetlana Kuznetsova (8)	9	6–1, 4–6, 6–2
QF	(Latvia) **Jeļena Ostapenko**	47	6–4, 2–6, 2–6

US Open
2009 US Open (9th seed)
Round	Opponent	Rank	Score
1R	(Kazakhstan) Galina Voskoboeva	87	6–4, 6–0
2R	(Croatia) Petra Martić (Q)	137	6–1, 6–0
3R	(Romania) Sorana Cîrstea (24)	26	6–3, 6–2
4R	(Russia) Svetlana Kuznetsova (6)	6	2–6, 7–6^{(7–5)}, 7–6^{(7–3)}
QF	(United States) Melanie Oudin	70	6–2, 6–2
SF	(Belgium) Yanina Wickmayer	50	6–3, 6–3
F	(Belgium) **Kim Clijsters** (WC)	N/A	5–7, 3–6
2014 US Open (10th seed)
Round	Opponent	Rank	Score
1R	(Slovakia) Magdaléna Rybáriková	43	6–1, 3–6, 2–0 ret.
2R	(Belarus) Aliaksandra Sasnovich (Q)	120	6–3, 6–4
3R	(Germany) Andrea Petkovic (18)	19	6–3, 6–2
4R	(Russia) Maria Sharapova (5)	6	6–4, 2–6, 6–2
QF	(Italy) Sara Errani (13)	14	6–0, 6–1
SF	(China) Peng Shuai	39	7–6^{(7–1)}, 4–3 ret.
F	(United States) **Serena Williams** (1)	**1**	3–6, 3–6

== Wins over top-10 players ==
Season	2008	2009	2010	2011	2012	2013	2014	2015	2016	2017	2018	...	2023	Total
ws	4	6	8	8	2	2	6	4	4	14	3		0	61

#	Player	Rank	Tournament	Surface	Round	Score	WRk
2008
1.	(France) Marion Bartoli	9	Qatar Open, Qatar	Hard	2R	6–2, 6–3	53
2.	(France) Marion Bartoli	10	Miami Open, United States	Hard	2R	6–3, 6–1	43
3.	(Russia) Svetlana Kuznetsova	4	Eastbourne International, United Kingdom	Grass	2R	6–2, 6–2	32
4.	(Poland) Agnieszka Radwańska	10	Nordic Light Open, Sweden	Hard	SF	6–4, 6–1	26
2009
5.	(Russia) Elena Dementieva	4	Miami Open, United States	Hard	4R	7–5, 6–4	12
6.	(Russia) Elena Dementieva	3	Charleston Open, United States	Clay	SF	6–4, 5–7, 7–5	9
7.	(Italy) Flavia Pennetta	10	Connecticut Open, United States	Hard	SF	6–4, 6–1	9
8.	(Russia) Svetlana Kuznetsova	6	US Open, United States	Hard	4R	2–6, 7–6^{(7–5)}, 7–6^{(7–3)}	8
9.	(Belarus) Victoria Azarenka	6	WTA Finals, Qatar	Hard	RR	1–6, 6–4, 7–5	4
10.	(Russia) Vera Zvonareva	9	WTA Finals, Qatar	Hard	RR	6–0, 6–7^{(7–9)}, 6–4	4
2010
11.	(Poland) Agnieszka Radwańska	8	Indian Wells Open, United States	Hard	SF	6–2, 6–3	4
12.	(Italy) Francesca Schiavone	7	Canadian Open, Canada	Hard	QF	6–3, 6–2	3
13.	(Poland) Agnieszka Radwańska	9	Pan Pacific Open, Japan	Hard	QF	5–0 ret.	2
14.	(Russia) Elena Dementieva	10	Pan Pacific Open, Japan	Hard	F	1–6, 6–2, 6–3	2
15.	(Russia) Vera Zvonareva	4	China Open, China	Hard	F	6–3, 3–6, 6–3	2
16.	(Russia) Elena Dementieva	9	WTA Finals, Qatar	Hard	RR	6–1, 6–1	1
17.	(Italy) Francesca Schiavone	6	WTA Finals, Qatar	Hard	RR	3–6, 6–1, 6–1	1
18.	(Russia) Vera Zvonareva	2	WTA Finals, Qatar	Hard	SF	7–5, 6–0	1
2011
19.	(Italy) Francesca Schiavone	7	Australian Open, Australia	Hard	QF	6–3, 3–6, 6–3	1
20.	(Serbia) Jelena Janković	8	Dubai Championships, UAE	Hard	SF	7–5, 6–3	2
21.	(Belarus) Victoria Azarenka	9	Indian Wells Open, United States	Hard	QF	3–0 ret.	1
22.	(Serbia) Jelena Janković	8	Charleston Open, United States	Clay	SF	6–4, 6–4	1
23.	(Serbia) Jelena Janković	9	Italian Open, Italy	Clay	QF	6–3, 1–6, 6–3	1
24.	(Italy) Francesca Schiavone	5	Brussels Open, Belgium	Clay	SF	6–4, 4–6, 6–3	1
25.	(Italy) Francesca Schiavone	8	Connecticut Open, United States	Hard	SF	7–6^{(7–2)}, 6–3	1
26.	(Poland) Agnieszka Radwańska	8	WTA Finals, Turkey	Hard (i)	RR	5–7, 6–2, 6–4	1
2012
27.	(China) Li Na	8	Pan Pacific Open, Japan	Hard	3R	4–6, 6–3, 6–4	11
28.	(Australia) Samantha Stosur	9	Kremlin Cup, Russia	Hard (i)	F	6–2, 4–6, 7–5	11
2013
29.	(Germany) Angelique Kerber	6	Indian Wells Open, United States	Hard	SF	2–6, 6–4, 7–5	10
30.	(Czech Republic) Petra Kvitová	9	Cincinnati Open, United States	Hard	3R	3–6, 6–2, 6–3	10
2014
31.	(Germany) Angelique Kerber	7	Cincinnati Open, United States	Hard	3R	7–5, 6–2	12
32.	(Poland) Agnieszka Radwańska	5	Cincinnati Open, United States	Hard	QF	6–4, 7–6^{(7–5)}	12
33.	(Russia) Maria Sharapova	6	US Open, United States	Hard	4R	6–4, 2–6, 6–2	11
34.	(Russia) Maria Sharapova	2	WTA Finals, Singapore	Hard (i)	RR	7–6^{(7–4)}, 6–7^{(5–7)}, 6–2	8
35.	(Poland) Agnieszka Radwańska	6	WTA Finals, Singapore	Hard (i)	RR	7–5, 6–3	8
36.	(Czech Republic) Petra Kvitová	3	WTA Finals, Singapore	Hard (i)	RR	6–2, 6–3	8
2015
37.	(Spain) Carla Suárez Navarro	10	Stuttgart Open, Germany	Clay (i)	QF	6–0, 6–3	5
38.	(Romania) Simona Halep	3	Stuttgart Open, Germany	Clay (i)	SF	7–5, 5–7, 6–2	5
39.	(Poland) Agnieszka Radwańska	9	Madrid Open, Spain	Clay	3R	6–3, 6–2	5
40.	(Germany) Angelique Kerber	9	Pan Pacific Open, Japan	Hard	QF	6–2, 2–6, 6–3	6
2016
41.	(Russia) Svetlana Kuznetsova	10	US Open, United States	Hard	2R	6–4, 6–4	74
42.	(United States) Madison Keys	9	US Open, United States	Hard	4R	6–3, 6–4	74
43.	(Spain) Carla Suárez Navarro	8	Pan Pacific Open, Japan	Hard	2R	7–6^{(7–4)}, 4–6, 6–4	19
44.	(Poland) Agnieszka Radwańska	4	Pan Pacific Open, Japan	Hard	SF	4–6, 7–5, 6–4	19
2017
45.	(Poland) Agnieszka Radwańska	6	Qatar Open, Qatar	Hard	2R	7–5, 6–3	18
46.	(United States) Madison Keys	9	Indian Wells Open, United States	Hard	4R	6–4, 6–4	14
47.	(Spain) Garbiñe Muguruza	6	Miami Open, United States	Hard	4R	7–6^{(7–1)} ret.	15
48.	(Czech Republic) Karolína Plíšková	3	Miami Open, United States	Hard	SF	5–7, 6–1, 6–1	15
49.	(Russia) Svetlana Kuznetsova	9	French Open, France	Clay	4R	6–1, 4–6, 6–2	12
50.	(Romania) Simona Halep	2	Eastbourne International, United Kingdom	Grass	QF	5–7, 6–4, 6–1	6
51.	(Poland) Agnieszka Radwańska	10	Canadian Open, Canada	Hard	3R	6–3, 6–1	6
52.	(Czech Republic) Karolína Plíšková	1	Canadian Open, Canada	Hard	QF	7–5, 6–7^{(3–7)}, 6–4	6
53.	(Slovakia) Dominika Cibulková	9	Pan Pacific Open, Japan	Hard	QF	3–6, 7–6^{(7–5)}, 3–1 ret.	6
54.	(Spain) Garbiñe Muguruza	1	Pan Pacific Open, Japan	Hard	SF	6–2, 6–0	6
55.	(Ukraine) Elina Svitolina	4	WTA Finals, Singapore	Hard (i)	RR	6–2, 6–0	6
56.	(Romania) Simona Halep	1	WTA Finals, Singapore	Hard (i)	RR	6–0, 6–2	6
57.	(Czech Republic) Karolína Plíšková	3	WTA Finals, Singapore	Hard (i)	SF	7–6^{(11–9)}, 6–3	6
58.	(United States) Venus Williams	5	WTA Finals, Singapore	Hard (i)	F	6–4, 6–4	6
2018
59.	(Romania) Simona Halep	1	Australian Open, Australia	Hard	F	7–6^{(7–2)}, 3–6, 6–4	2
60.	(Germany) Angelique Kerber	9	Qatar Open, Qatar	Hard	QF	7–6^{(7–4)}, 1–6, 6–3	1
61.	(Czech Republic) Petra Kvitová	5	WTA Finals, Singapore	Hard (i)	RR	7–5, 3–6, 6–2	3

=== Double bagel matches ===
#	Player	Rank	Event	Surface	Round	Result	CWR
1.	(Romania) Edina Gallovits-Hall	91	2009 Connecticut Open, United States	Hard	1R	W	9
2.	(Chinese Taipei) Chang Kai-chen	84	2010 US Open, United States	Hard	2R	SF	2
3.	(Switzerland) Belinda Bencic	62	2014 İstanbul Cup, Turkey	Hard	1R	W	15
4.	(Canada) Françoise Abanda	195	2017 French Open, France	Clay	2R	QF	12

== See also ==
- 2018 Caroline Wozniacki tennis season
- List of career achievements by Caroline Wozniacki
- List of WTA number 1 ranked singles tennis players
- WTA Tour records
