= 2005 Fed Cup Europe/Africa Zone Group I – play-offs =

International tennis competition play-offs

The play-offs of the 2005 Fed Cup Europe/Africa Zone Group I were the final stages of the Group I Zonal Competition involving teams from Europe and Africa. Using the positions determined in their pools, the sixteen teams faced off to determine their placing in the 2005 Fed Cup Europe/Africa Zone Group I. The top two teams advanced to World Group II play-offs, and the bottom two teams were relegated down to the Europe/Africa Zone Group II for the next year.

Placing	Pool A	Pool B	Pool C	Pool D
1	Bulgaria	Netherlands	Slovenia	Belarus
2	South Africa	Sweden	Serbia and Montenegro	Israel
3	Hungary	Luxembourg	Great Britain	Ukraine
4	Estonia	Poland	Denmark	Greece

== Promotion play-offs ==
The first placed teams of each pool were placed against each other in two head-to-head rounds. The winner of the rounds advanced to the World Group II play-offs, where they would get a chance to advance to the World Group II for next year.

=== Bulgaria vs. Netherlands ===
Bulgaria
2
Club Ali Bey, Manavgat, Antalya, Turkey
23 April 2005
Red clay (outdoors)

Netherlands
0

			1	2	3
1	(Bulgaria) (Netherlands)	Sesil Karatantcheva; Elise Tamaëla	6; 1	6; 1
2	(Bulgaria) (Netherlands)	Magdalena Maleeva; Michaëlla Krajicek	4; 6	6; 3	6; 2
3	(Bulgaria) (Netherlands)					not played

=== Slovenia vs. Belarus ===
Slovenia
2
Club Ali Bey, Manavgat, Antalya, Turkey
23 April 2005
Red clay (outdoors)

Belarus
1

			1	2	3
1	(Slovenia) (Belarus)	Tina Pisnik; Victoria Azarenka	7^{7} 6^{2}	6^{0} 7^{7}	2; 6
2	(Slovenia) (Belarus)	Katarina Srebotnik; Anastasiya Yakimova	6; 1	6; 0
3	(Slovenia) (Belarus)	Tina Križan / Katarina Srebotnik; Victoria Azarenka / Tatiana Poutchek	6; 3	6; 2

== Fifth to Seventh play-off ==
The second placed teams of each pool were placed against each other in two ties. The winner of each tie was allocated fifth place in the Group while the losers were allocated seventh.

=== South Africa vs. Sweden ===
South Africa
2
Club Ali Bey, Manavgat, Antalya, Turkey
23 April 2005
Red clay (outdoors)

Sweden
1

			1	2	3
1	(South Africa) (Sweden)	Chanelle Scheepers; Sousan Massi	6; 0	6; 4
2	(South Africa) (Sweden)	Natalie Grandin; Sofia Arvidsson	4; 6	4; 6
3	(South Africa) (Sweden)	Natalie Grandin / Alicia Pillay; Johanna Larsson / Sousan Massi	7; 5	6; 4

=== Serbia and Montenegro vs. Israel ===
Serbia and Montenegro
0
Club Ali Bey, Manavgat, Antalya, Turkey
23 April 2005
Red clay (outdoors)

Israel
2

			1	2	3
1	(Serbia and Montenegro) (Israel)	Dragana Zarić; Tzipora Obziler	1; 6	4; 6
2	(Serbia and Montenegro) (Israel)	Ana Timotić; Shahar Pe'er	4; 6	6; 4	3; 6
3	(Serbia and Montenegro) (Israel)					not played

== Ninth and Eleventh play-off ==
The third placed teams of each pool were placed against each other in two ties. The winner of each tie was allocated ninth place in the Group while the losers were allocated eleventh.

=== Hungary vs. Luxembourg ===
Hungary
1
Club Ali Bey, Manavgat, Antalya, Turkey
23 April 2005
Red clay (outdoors)

Luxembourg
2

			1	2	3
1	(Hungary) (Luxembourg)	Barbara Pócza; Mandy Minella	6^{5} 7^{7}	4; 6
2	(Hungary) (Luxembourg)	Zsófia Gubacsi; Anne Kremer	7; 5	6^{8} 7^{10}	3; 6
3	(Hungary) (Luxembourg)	Zsófia Gubacsi / Virág Németh; Mandy Minella / Lynn Philippe	7; 5	6; 4

=== Great Britain vs. Ukraine ===
Great Britain
1
Club Ali Bey, Manavgat, Antalya, Turkey
23 April 2005
Red clay (outdoors)

Ukraine
2

			1	2	3
1	(United Kingdom) (Ukraine)	Katie O'Brien; Valeria Bondarenko	6; 3	6; 3
2	(United Kingdom) (Ukraine)	Elena Baltacha; Alona Bondarenko	1; 6	3; 6
3	(United Kingdom) (Ukraine)	Katie O'Brien / Jane O'Donoghue; Alona Bondarenko / Valeria Bondarenko	3; 6	2; 6

== Relegation play-offs ==
The last placed teams of each pool were placed against each other in two ties. The losing team of the rounds were relegated to Group II for next year.

=== Estonia vs. Poland ===
Estonia
3
Club Ali Bey, Manavgat, Antalya, Turkey
20 April 2005
Red clay (outdoors)

Poland
0

			1	2	3
1	(Estonia) (Poland)	Margit Rüütel; Joanna Sakowicz-Kostecka	6; 1			retired
2	(Estonia) (Poland)	Maret Ani; Karolina Kosińska	6; 1	7^{7} 6^{1}
3	(Estonia) (Poland)	Anett Kaasik / Margit Rüütel; Klaudia Jans / Alicja Rosolska	5; 7	6; 4	6; 3

=== Denmark vs. Greece ===
Denmark
2
Club Ali Bey, Manavgat, Antalya, Turkey
20 April 2005
Red clay (outdoors)

Greece
1

			1	2	3
1	(Denmark) (Greece)	Caroline Wozniacki; Anna Koumantou	4; 6	6; 1	6; 3
2	(Denmark) (Greece)	Karina-Ildor Jacobsgaard; Anna Gerasimou	6; 3	5; 7	9; 11
3	(Denmark) (Greece)	Hanne Skak Jensen / Caroline Wozniacki; Asimina Kaplani / Anna Koumantou	7^{7} 6^{5}	6; 4

== Final Placements ==
Placing	Teams	
Promoted	Bulgaria	Slovenia
Third	Netherlands	Belarus
Fifth	South Africa	Israel
Seventh	Sweden	Serbia and Montenegro
Ninth	Luxembourg	Ukraine
Eleventh	Hungary	Great Britain
Thirteenth	Estonia	Denmark
Relegated	Poland	Greece

- Bulgaria and Slovenia advanced to the World Group II play-offs. The Bulgarians were drawn against Japan, and they lost 1–4. The Slovenians were drawn against China, and they also lost 1–4. Both teams thus fell back to Group I for the next year.
- Poland and Greece were relegated down to Europe/Africa Zone Group II for the next year. The Polish placed first overall, thus achieving advancement back to Group I for 2006, while the Greeks placed fifth.

== See also ==
- Fed Cup structure
