= 2014 İstanbul Cup =

- Date: 14–20 July
- Edition: 7th
- Category: WTA Internationals
- Draw: 32S / 16D
- Prize money: $250,000
- Surface: Hard / outdoor
- Location: Istanbul, Turkey

Champions

Singles
- (Denmark) Caroline Wozniacki

Doubles
- (Japan) Misaki Doi / (Ukraine) Elina Svitolina
← 2010 ·	İstanbul Cup	· 2015 →

The 2014 İstanbul Cup (also known as the TEB BNP Paribas İstanbul Cup for sponsorship reasons) was a women's tennis tournament played on outdoor hard courts. It was the seventh edition of the İstanbul Cup, and was part of the WTA International tournaments of the 2014 WTA Tour. It took place in Istanbul, Turkey, from 14 July through 20 July 2014. This was the first edition of the tournament since 2010. The event was not held in 2011–2013 because the WTA Tour Championships were held in İstanbul during those years. First-seeded Caroline Wozniacki won the singles title.

== Finals ==
=== Singles ===
(Denmark) Caroline Wozniacki defeated (Italy) Roberta Vinci, 6–1, 6–1

- It was Wozniacki's only singles title of the year and the 22nd of her career.

=== Doubles ===
- (Japan) Misaki Doi / (Ukraine) Elina Svitolina defeated (Georgia (country)) Oksana Kalashnikova / (Poland) Paula Kania, 6–4, 6–0

== Points and prize money ==
=== Point distribution ===
Event	W	F	SF	QF	Round of 16	Round of 32	Q	Q2	Q1
Singles	280	180	110	60	30	1	18	12	1
Doubles	280	180	110	60	1	—	—	—	—

=== Prize money ===
Event	W	F	SF	QF	Round of 16	Round of 32	Q2	Q1
Singles	$43,000	$21,400	$11,500	$6,175	$3,400	$2,100	$1,020	$600
Doubles	$12,300	$6,400	$3,435	$1,820	$960	—	—	—

== Singles main-draw entrants ==
=== Seeds ===
Country	Player	Rank^{1}	Seed
DEN	Caroline Wozniacki	15	1
ITA	Roberta Vinci	24	2
CZE	Klára Koukalová	31	3
UKR	Elina Svitolina	35	4
SVK	Magdaléna Rybáriková	37	5
JPN	Kurumi Nara	39	6
SRB	Bojana Jovanovski	41	7
CZE	Karolína Plíšková	48	8

- Rankings are as of July 7, 2014.

=== Other entrants ===
The following players received wildcards into the singles main draw

- (Turkey) Çağla Büyükakçay
- (Turkey) İpek Soylu
- (Denmark) Caroline Wozniacki

The following players received entry from the qualifying draw:

- (Romania) Alexandra Dulgheru
- (Croatia) Ana Konjuh
- (United Kingdom) Johanna Konta
- (Ukraine) Kateryna Kozlova
- (Russia) Elizaveta Kulichkova
- (Czech Republic) Kateřina Siniaková

=== Withdrawals ===
Before the tournament

- (Germany) Andrea Petkovic
- (Poland) Urszula Radwańska
- (Croatia) Ajla Tomljanović
- (Belgium) Yanina Wickmayer

=== Retirements ===
- (Romania) Alexandra Dulgheru (shoulder injury)
- (Romania) Monica Niculescu

== Doubles main-draw entrants ==
=== Seeds ===
Country	Player	Country	Player	Rank^{1}	Seed
UKR	Irina Buryachok	RUS	Alla Kudryavtseva	98	1
CZE	Karolína Plíšková	CZE	Kristýna Plíšková	124	2
UKR	Yuliya Beygelzimer	UKR	Olga Savchuk	142	3
SVK	Janette Husárová	POL	Klaudia Jans-Ignacik	143	4

- ^{1} Rankings as of July 7, 2014.

=== Other entrants ===
The following pairs received wildcards into the main draw:

- (Serbia) Bojana Jovanovski / (Italy) Francesca Schiavone
- (Turkey) Melis Sezer / (Turkey) İpek Soylu
