= 2010 MPS Group Championships =

- Date: April 5–11
- Edition: 31st
- Category: WTA International
- Draw: 32S / 16D
- Prize money: $220,000
- Surface: Clay
- Location: Ponte Vedra Beach, Florida, U.S.
- Venue: Sawgrass Country Club

Champions

Singles
- (Denmark) Caroline Wozniacki

Doubles
- (United States) Bethanie Mattek-Sands / (China) Yan Zi
← 2009 ·	Amelia Island Championships

The 2010 MPS Group Championships was a women's tennis tournament played on outdoor clay courts. It was the 31st edition of the MPS Group Championships and the second held in its new location, and was part of the International series of the 2010 WTA Tour. It took place at the Sawgrass Country Club in Ponte Vedra Beach, Florida, United States from April 5 through April 11, 2010.

The tournament was headlined by world no. 2 Caroline Wozniacki, 2010 Moorilla Hobart International champion Alyona Bondarenko, 2008 finalist Dominika Cibulková, and 2010 Monterrey Open champion Anastasia Pavlyuchenkova.

== Finals ==
=== Singles ===
(Denmark) Caroline Wozniacki defeated (Belarus) Olga Govortsova, 6–2, 7–5

- It was Wozniacki's first title of the year and 7th of her career. It was her second win at the event, also winning in 2009.

=== Doubles ===
(United States) Bethanie Mattek-Sands / (China) Yan Zi defeated (Chinese Taipei) Chuang Chia-jung / (China) Peng Shuai, 4–6, 6–4, [10–8]

== Entrants ==
=== Seeds ===
Athlete	Nationality	Ranking*	Seeding
Caroline Wozniacki	Denmark	2	1
Alyona Bondarenko	Ukraine	25	2
Dominika Cibulková	Slovakia	28	3
Elena Vesnina	Russia	34	4
Anastasia Pavlyuchenkova	Russia	35	5
Aleksandra Wozniak	Canada	38	6
Virginie Razzano	France	39	7
Melanie Oudin	United States	42	8

- Rankings and seedings are as of March 22.

=== Other entrants ===
The following players received wildcards into the main draw:

- (United States) Carly Gullickson
- (Japan) Ayumi Morita
- (United States) Sloane Stephens

The following players received entry via qualifying:

- (Australia) Sophie Ferguson
- (Kazakhstan) Sesil Karatantcheva
- (United States) Bethanie Mattek-Sands
- (Georgia (country)) Anna Tatishvili
