= 2005 Fed Cup Europe/Africa Zone Group I – Pool C =

International tennis competition

Group C of the 2005 Fed Cup Europe/Africa Zone Group I was one of four pools in the Europe/Africa Zone Group I of the 2005 Fed Cup. Four teams competed in a round robin competition, with the top team and the bottom team proceeding to their respective sections of the play-offs: the top team played for advancement to the World Group II Play-offs, while the bottom team faced potential relegation to Group II.

		(Slovenia) SLO	(Serbia and Montenegro) SCG	(United Kingdom) GBR	(Denmark) DEN	RR; W–L	Set; W–L	Game; W–L	Standings
17	Slovenia		2–1	3–0	1–2	3–0	13–5	100–62	1
28	Serbia and Montenegro	1–2		2–1	3–0	2–1	12–10	100–100	2
37	Great Britain	0–3	1–2		2–1	1–2	8–13	87–105	3
49	Denmark	2–1	0–3	1–2		1–2	7–12	82–102	4

== Slovenia vs. Great Britain ==
Slovenia
3
Club Ali Bey, Manavgat, Antalya, Turkey
20 April 2005
Red clay (outdoors)

Great Britain
0

			1	2	3
1	(Slovenia) (United Kingdom)	Tina Pisnik; Anne Keothavong	6; 3	6; 3
2	(Slovenia) (United Kingdom)	Katarina Srebotnik; Elena Baltacha	6; 1	6; 1
3	(Slovenia) (United Kingdom)	Andreja Klepač / Tina Križan; Elena Baltacha / Jane O'Donoghue	6; 1	6; 4

== Serbia and Montenegro vs. Denmark ==
Serbia and Montenegro
3
Club Ali Bey, Manavgat, Antalya, Turkey
20 April 2005
Red clay (outdoors)

Denmark
0

			1	2	3
1	(Serbia and Montenegro) (Denmark)	Ana Jovanović; Caroline Wozniacki	4; 6	7^{7} 6^{5}	6; 4
2	(Serbia and Montenegro) (Denmark)	Jelena Janković; Karina-Ildor Jacobsgaard	6; 3	6; 0
3	(Serbia and Montenegro) (Denmark)	Jelena Janković / Dragana Zarić; Karina-Ildor Jacobsgaard / Hanne Skak Jensen	6; 2	6; 2

== Slovenia vs. Serbia and Montenegro ==
Slovenia
2
Club Ali Bey, Manavgat, Antalya, Turkey
21 April 2005
Red clay (outdoors)

Serbia and Montenegro
1

			1	2	3
1	(Slovenia) (Serbia and Montenegro)	Tina Pisnik; Ana Timotić	6; 0	6; 1
2	(Slovenia) (Serbia and Montenegro)	Katarina Srebotnik; Jelena Janković	6; 1	4; 6	6; 8
3	(Slovenia) (Serbia and Montenegro)	Tina Križan / Katarina Srebotnik; Jelena Janković / Dragana Zarić	6; 0	7^{8} 6^{6}

== Great Britain vs. Denmark ==
Great Britain
2
Club Ali Bey, Manavgat, Antalya, Turkey
21 April 2005
Red clay (outdoors)

Denmark
1

			1	2	3
1	(United Kingdom) (Denmark)	Anne Keothavong; Caroline Wozniacki	6; 3	4; 6	6; 2
2	(United Kingdom) (Denmark)	Elena Baltacha; Karina-Ildor Jacobsgaard	6; 3	7; 5
3	(United Kingdom) (Denmark)	Katie O'Brien / Jane O'Donoghue; Karina-Ildor Jacobsgaard / Hanne Skak Jensen	3; 6	6^{5} 7^{7}

== Slovenia vs. Denmark ==
Slovenia
1
Club Ali Bey, Manavgat, Antalya, Turkey
22 April 2005
Red clay (outdoors)

Denmark
2

			1	2	3
1	(Slovenia) (Denmark)	Tina Križan; Caroline Wozniacki	4; 6	0; 6
2	(Slovenia) (Denmark)	Andreja Klepač; Karina-Ildor Jacobsgaard	4; 6	7^{7} 6^{3}	6; 2
3	(Slovenia) (Denmark)	Andreja Klepač / Tina Križan; Gluay Kampookaew / Hanne Skak Jensen	2; 1			retired

== Serbia and Montenegro vs. Great Britain ==
Serbia and Montenegro
2
Club Ali Bey, Manavgat, Antalya, Turkey
22 April 2005
Red clay (outdoors)

Great Britain
1

			1	2	3
1	(Serbia and Montenegro) (United Kingdom)	Dragana Zarić; Anne Keothavong	2; 6	6; 4	6; 4
2	(Serbia and Montenegro) (United Kingdom)	Ana Timotić; Elena Baltacha	5; 7	6; 3	6; 0
3	(Serbia and Montenegro) (United Kingdom)	Ana Timotić / Dragana Zarić; Katie O'Brien / Jane O'Donoghue	2; 6	4; 6

== See also ==
- Fed Cup structure
