= 2008 Fed Cup Europe/Africa Zone Group I – Pool B =

Group B of the 2008 Fed Cup Europe/Africa Zone Group I was one of four pools in the Europe/Africa Zone Group I of the 2008 Fed Cup. Four teams competed in a round robin competition, with the top team and the bottom team proceeding to their respective sections of the play-offs: the top team played for advancement to the World Group II Play-offs, while the bottom team faced potential relegation to Group II.

		(Switzerland) SUI	(United Kingdom) GBR	(Denmark) DEN	(Hungary) HUN	RR; W–L	Set; W–L	Game; W–L	Standings
23	Switzerland		2–1	3–0	2–1	3–0	14–7	108–91	1
31	Great Britain	1–2		1–2	1–2	0–3	7–13	81–103	4
41	Denmark	0–3	2–1		0–3	1–2	6–15	75–106	3
43	Hungary	1–2	2–1	3–0		2–1	14–6	108–72	2

== Switzerland vs. Great Britain ==
Switzerland
2
SYMA Sportközpont, Budapest, Hungary
30 January 2008
Taraflex carpet (indoors)

Great Britain
1

			1	2	3
1	(Switzerland) (United Kingdom)	Emmanuelle Gagliardi; Anne Keothavong	1; 6	4; 6
2	(Switzerland) (United Kingdom)	Patty Schnyder; Katie O'Brien	7^{7} 6^{5}	7; 5
3	(Switzerland) (United Kingdom)	Emmanuelle Gagliardi / Patty Schnyder; Elena Baltacha / Melanie South	6; 3	6; 3

== Denmark vs. Hungary ==
Denmark
0
SYMA Sportközpont, Budapest, Hungary
30 January 2008
Taraflex carpet (indoors)

Hungary
3

			1	2	3
1	(Denmark) (Hungary)	Eva Dyrberg; Gréta Arn	3; 6	3; 6
2	(Denmark) (Hungary)	Karina-Ildor Jacobsgaard; Ágnes Szávay	0; 6	3; 6
3	(Denmark) (Hungary)	Eva Dyrberg / Karina-Ildor Jacobsgaard; Gréta Arn / Ágnes Szávay	2; 6	2; 6

== Switzerland vs. Denmark ==
Switzerland
3
SYMA Sportközpont, Budapest, Hungary
31 January 2008
Taraflex carpet (indoors)

Denmark
0

			1	2	3
1	(Switzerland) (Denmark)	Emmanuelle Gagliardi; Hanne Skak Jensen	7; 5	6; 2
2	(Switzerland) (Denmark)	Patty Schnyder; Caroline Wozniacki	6; 1	7^{8} 6^{6}
3	(Switzerland) (Denmark)	Patty Schnyder / Stefanie Vögele; Eva Dyrberg / Karina-Ildor Jacobsgaard	6; 1	1; 6	6; 4

== Great Britain vs. Hungary ==
Great Britain
1
SYMA Sportközpont, Budapest, Hungary
31 January 2008
Taraflex carpet (indoors)

Hungary
2

			1	2	3
1	(United Kingdom) (Hungary)	Anne Keothavong; Gréta Arn	7^{7} 6^{5}	7; 5
2	(United Kingdom) (Hungary)	Katie O'Brien; Ágnes Szávay	0; 6	3; 6
3	(United Kingdom) (Hungary)	Elena Baltacha / Melanie South; Gréta Arn / Ágnes Szávay	2; 6	2; 6

== Switzerland vs. Hungary ==
Switzerland
2
SYMA Sportközpont, Budapest, Hungary
1 February 2008
Taraflex carpet (indoors)

Hungary
1

			1	2	3
1	(Switzerland) (Hungary)	Stefanie Vögele; Gréta Arn	5; 7	5; 7
2	(Switzerland) (Hungary)	Patty Schnyder; Ágnes Szávay	6; 4	3; 6	6; 1
3	(Switzerland) (Hungary)	Emmanuelle Gagliardi / Patty Schnyder; Gréta Arn / Ágnes Szávay	6; 3	1; 6	6; 3

== Great Britain vs. Denmark ==
Great Britain
1
SYMA Sportközpont, Budapest, Hungary
1 February 2008
Taraflex carpet (indoors)

Denmark
2

			1	2	3
1	(United Kingdom) (Denmark)	Anne Keothavong; Hanne Skak Jensen	4; 6	6; 4	6; 2
2	(United Kingdom) (Denmark)	Katie O'Brien; Caroline Wozniacki	2; 6	6; 1	2; 6
3	(United Kingdom) (Denmark)	Elena Baltacha / Anne Keothavong; Eva Dyrberg / Caroline Wozniacki	3; 6	2; 6

== See also ==
- Fed Cup structure
