= 2010 MPS Group Championships – Doubles =

Doubles
- 2010 MPS Group Championships

Final
- Champions: (United States) Bethanie Mattek-Sands (China) Yan Zi
- Runners-up: (Chinese Taipei) Chuang Chia-jung (China) Peng Shuai
- Score: 4–6, 6–4, [10–8]

Details
- Draw: 16 (2 WC )
- Seeds: 4

Events
Singles	Doubles
← 2009 ·	Amelia Island Championships

Chuang Chia-jung and Sania Mirza were the defenders of the championship title, but Mirza chose not to compete.
Chuang partnered up with Peng Shuai, but Bethanie Mattek-Sands and Yan Zi but defeated them 4–6, 6–4, [10–8].

== Seeds ==
1. (United States) Bethanie Mattek-Sands / (China) Yan Zi (champions)
2. (Chinese Taipei) Chuang Chia-jung / (China) Peng Shuai (finals)
3. (Ukraine) Alyona Bondarenko / (Russia) Elena Vesnina (first round)
4. (Belarus) Olga Govortsova / (Russia) Alla Kudryavtseva (first round)

== Draw ==
=== Key ===
- Q = Qualifier
- WC = Wild card
- LL = Lucky loser
- Alt = Alternate
- SE = Special exempt
- PR = Protected ranking
- ITF = ITF entry
- JE = Junior exempt
- w/o = Walkover
- r = Retired
- d = Defaulted
- SR = Special ranking

=== Draw ===
First round
1	(United States) B Mattek-Sands (China) Z Yan	7	6
(South Africa) N Grandin (United States) A Spears	5	2
(Australia) An Rodionova (Russia) Ar Rodionova	3	5
WC	(Slovakia) D Cibulková (Japan) A Morita	6	7
3	(Ukraine) A Bondarenko (Russia) E Vesnina	4	2
(Czech Republic) A Hlaváčková (Ukraine) O Savchuk	6	6
(Belarus) E Dzehalevich (Canada) M-È Pelletier	6	6
WC	(Denmark) M Ejdesgaard (Denmark) C Wozniacki	2	1
(Belarus) T Poutchek (Turkey) İ Şenoğlu	3	4
(United Kingdom) S Borwell (United States) R Kops-Jones	6	6
(Germany) J Görges (Czech Republic) B Záhlavová-Strýcová	6	3	[10]
4	(Belarus) O Govortsova (Russia) A Kudryavtseva	3	6	[5]
(Latvia) L Dekmeijere (Switzerland) P Schnyder	6	6^{2}	[10]
Alt	(United States) J Ditty (United States) C Gullickson	3	7	[7]
(Russia) E Makarova (Russia) A Pavlyuchenkova	6	5	[9]
2	(Chinese Taipei) C-j Chuang (China) S Peng	4	7	[11]

Quarterfinals
1	(United States) B Mattek-Sands (China) Z Yan	6	6
WC	(Slovakia) D Cibulková (Japan) A Morita	2	1
(Czech Republic) A Hlaváčková (Ukraine) O Savchuk	6	4	[10]
(Belarus) E Dzehalevich (Canada) M-È Pelletier	4	6	[8]
(United Kingdom) S Borwell (United States) R Kops-Jones	6	3	[10]
(Germany) J Görges (Czech Republic) B Záhlavová-Strýcová	3	6	[8]
(Latvia) L Dekmeijere (Switzerland) P Schnyder	5	4
2	(Chinese Taipei) C-j Chuang (China) S Peng	7	6

Semifinals
1	(United States) B Mattek-Sands (China) Z Yan	5	6	[10]
(Czech Republic) A Hlaváčková (Ukraine) O Savchuk	7	1	[4]
(United Kingdom) S Borwell (United States) R Kops-Jones	3	7	[6]
2	(Chinese Taipei) C-j Chuang (China) S Peng	6	6^{5}	[10]

Finals
1	(United States) B Mattek-Sands (China) Z Yan	4	6	[10]
2	(Chinese Taipei) C-j Chuang (China) S Peng	6	4	[8]
