= 2010 Fed Cup Europe/Africa Zone Group I – Pool C =

International tennis competition

Group C of the 2010 Fed Cup Europe/Africa Zone Group I was one of four pools in the Europe/Africa Zone Group I of the 2010 Fed Cup. Four teams competed in a round-robin competition, with the top team and the bottom team proceeding to their respective sections of the play-offs: the top team played for advancement to the World Group II Play-offs, while the bottom team faced potential relegation to Group II.

		(Sweden) SWE	(Hungary) HUN	(Denmark) DEN	(Latvia) LAT	RR; W–L	Set; W–L	Game; W–L	Standings
22	Sweden		3–0	2–1	2–1	3–0	14–4	90–55	1
29	Hungary	0–3		2–1	2–1	2–1	9–11	83–86	2
36	Denmark	1–2	1–2		2–1	1–2	9–12	73–95	3
42	Latvia	1–2	1–2	1–2		0–3	8–13	88–98	4

== Sweden vs. Denmark ==
Sweden
2
Complexo de Tenis do Jamor, Estádio Nacional, Lisbon, Portugal
3 February 2010
Greenset Grand Prix hard (indoors)

Denmark
1

			1	2	3
1	(Sweden) (Denmark)	Johanna Larsson; Mai Grage	6; 3	6; 1
2	(Sweden) (Denmark)	Sofia Arvidsson; Caroline Wozniacki	3; 6	1; 6
3	(Sweden) (Denmark)	Sofia Arvidsson / Johanna Larsson; Karina-Ildor Jacobsgaard / Caroline Wozniacki	6; 0	6; 0

== Hungary vs. Latvia ==
Hungary
2
Complexo de Tenis do Jamor, Estádio Nacional, Lisbon, Portugal
3 February 2010
Greenset Grand Prix hard (indoors)

Latvia
1

			1	2	3
1	(Hungary) (Latvia)	Réka-Luca Jani; Diāna Marcinkēviča	2; 6	6; 4	7; 5
2	(Hungary) (Latvia)	Anikó Kapros; Anastasija Sevastova	3; 6	0; 6
3	(Hungary) (Latvia)	Réka-Luca Jani / Anikó Kapros; Līga Dekmeijere / Anastasija Sevastova	7^{7} 6^{3}	6; 1

== Sweden vs. Latvia ==
Sweden
2
Complexo de Tenis do Jamor, Estádio Nacional, Lisbon, Portugal
4 February 2010
Greenset Grand Prix hard (indoors)

Latvia
1

			1	2	3
1	(Sweden) (Latvia)	Johanna Larsson; Diāna Marcinkēviča	6; 0	7; 5
2	(Sweden) (Latvia)	Sofia Arvidsson; Anastasija Sevastova	1; 6	0; 6
3	(Sweden) (Latvia)	Sofia Arvidsson / Johanna Larsson; Līga Dekmeijere / Anastasija Sevastova	6; 2	6; 2

== Hungary vs. Denmark ==
Hungary
2
Complexo de Tenis do Jamor, Estádio Nacional, Lisbon, Portugal
4 February 2010
Greenset Grand Prix hard (indoors)

Denmark
1

			1	2	3
1	(Hungary) (Denmark)	Réka-Luca Jani; Karina-Ildor Jacobsgaard	6; 0	6; 1
2	(Hungary) (Denmark)	Anikó Kapros; Mai Grage	6; 0	6; 0
3	(Hungary) (Denmark)	Réka-Luca Jani / Zsófia Susányi; Malou Ejdesgaard / Karina-Ildor Jacobsgaard	6; 3	3; 6	1; 6

== Sweden vs. Hungary ==
Sweden
3
Complexo de Tenis do Jamor, Estádio Nacional, Lisbon, Portugal
5 February 2010
Greenset Grand Prix hard (indoors)

Hungary
0

			1	2	3
1	(Sweden) (Hungary)	Johanna Larsson; Réka-Luca Jani	6; 4	6; 2
2	(Sweden) (Hungary)	Sofia Arvidsson; Anikó Kapros	6; 4	6; 2
3	(Sweden) (Hungary)	Ellen Allgurin / Anna Brazhnikova; Réka-Luca Jani / Zsófia Susányi	6; 4	6; 2

== Denmark vs. Latvia ==
Denmark
2
Complexo de Tenis do Jamor, Estádio Nacional, Lisbon, Portugal
5 February 2010
Greenset Grand Prix hard (indoors)

Latvia
1

			1	2	3
1	(Denmark) (Latvia)	Mai Grage; Diāna Marcinkēviča	4; 6	6; 4	6; 2
2	(Denmark) (Latvia)	Caroline Wozniacki; Anastasija Sevastova	6; 2	6; 2
3	(Denmark) (Latvia)	Malou Ejdesgaard / Karina-Ildor Jacobsgaard; Līga Dekmeijere / Irina Kuzmina	7; 5	4; 6	2; 6

== See also ==
- Fed Cup structure
