= 2009 MPS Group Championships =

- Date: April 6–12
- Edition: 30th
- Category: International series
- Draw: 32S / 16D
- Prize money: $220,000
- Surface: Clay / outdoor
- Location: Ponte Vedra Beach, FL, U.S.

Champions

Singles
- (Denmark) Caroline Wozniacki

Doubles
- (Chinese Taipei) Chuang Chia-jung / (India) Sania Mirza
- Amelia Island Championships

The 2009 MPS Group Championships was a women's tennis tournament played on outdoor clay courts. It was the 30th edition of the MPS Group Championships but the first held in its new location, and was part of the International series of the 2009 WTA Tour. It took place at the Sawgrass Country Club in Ponte Vedra Beach, Florida, from April 6 through April 12, 2009. Second-seeded Caroline Wozniacki won the singles title.

== Finals ==
=== Singles ===
(Denmark) Caroline Wozniacki defeated (Canada) Aleksandra Wozniak, 6–1, 6–2

- It was Wozniacki's first singles title of the year and the 4th of her career.

=== Doubles ===
(Chinese Taipei) Chuang Chia-jung / (India) Sania Mirza defeated (Czech Republic) Květa Peschke / (United States) Lisa Raymond, 6–3, 4–6, [10–7]
