= 2009 Fed Cup Europe/Africa Zone Group I – Pool C =

Group C of the 2009 Fed Cup Europe/Africa Zone Group I was one of four pools in the Europe/Africa Zone Group I of the 2009 Fed Cup. Four teams competed in a round robin competition, with the top team and the bottom team proceeding to their respective sections of the play-offs: the top team played for advancement to the World Group II Play-offs, while the bottom team faced potential relegation to Group II.

		(Austria) AUT	(Belarus) BLR	(Slovenia) SLO	(Denmark) DEN	RR; W–L	Set; W–L	Game; W–L	Standings
22	Austria		0–3	1–2	1–2	0–3	5–15	52–104	4
28	Belarus	3–0		3–0	2–1	3–0	16–2	68+37–44	1
37	Slovenia	2–1	0–3		1–2	1–2	7–13	81–101	3
40	Denmark	2–1	1–2	2–1		2–1	10–8	92–81	2

== Austria vs. Slovenia ==
Austria
1
Coral Tennis Club, Tallinn, Estonia
4 February 2009
Greenset hard (indoors)

Slovenia
2

			1	2	3
1	(Austria) (Slovenia)	Melanie Klaffner; Maša Zec-Peškirič	0; 6	2; 6
2	(Austria) (Slovenia)	Patricia Mayr; Andreja Klepač	5; 7	6; 1	3; 6
3	(Austria) (Slovenia)	Nikola Hofmanova / Sandra Klemenschits; Andreja Klepač / Maša Zec-Peškirič	3; 6	6; 2	6; 3

== Belarus vs. Denmark ==
Belarus
2
Coral Tennis Club, Tallinn, Estonia
4 February 2009
Greenset hard (indoors)

Denmark
1

			1	2	3
1	(Belarus) (Denmark)	Olga Govortsova; Hanne Skak Jensen	7^{8} 6^{6}	7^{7} 6^{5}
2	(Belarus) (Denmark)	Victoria Azarenka; Caroline Wozniacki	3; 6	3; 6
3	(Belarus) (Denmark)	Victoria Azarenka / Olga Govortsova; Eva Dyrberg / Caroline Wozniacki	6; 0	6; 4

== Austria vs. Denmark ==
Austria
1
Coral Tennis Club, Tallinn, Estonia
5 February 2009
Greenset hard (indoors)

Denmark
2

			1	2	3
1	(Austria) (Denmark)	Nikola Hofmanova; Hanne Skak Jensen	1; 6	5; 7
2	(Austria) (Denmark)	Patricia Mayr; Caroline Wozniacki	2; 6	1; 6
3	(Austria) (Denmark)	Melanie Klaffner / Sandra Klemenschits; Eva Dyrberg / Hanne Skak Jensen	6; 2	6; 3

== Belarus vs. Slovenia ==
Belarus
3
Coral Tennis Club, Tallinn, Estonia
5 February 2009
Greenset hard (indoors)

Slovenia
0

			1	2	3
1	(Belarus) (Slovenia)	Olga Govortsova; Maša Zec-Peškirič	6; 4	6; 1
2	(Belarus) (Slovenia)	Victoria Azarenka; Andreja Klepač	6; 3	6; 2
3	(Belarus) (Slovenia)	Ekaterina Dzehalevich / Tatiana Poutchek; Andreja Klepač / Maša Zec-Peškirič	6; 3	6; 3

== Austria vs. Belarus ==
Austria
0
Coral Tennis Club, Tallinn, Estonia
6 February 2009
Greenset hard (indoors)

Belarus
3

			1	2	3
1	(Austria) (Belarus)	Nikola Hofmanova; Tatiana Poutchek	2; 6	2; 6
2	(Austria) (Belarus)	Melanie Klaffner; Ekaterina Dzehalevich	1; 6	1; 6
3	(Austria) (Belarus)	Sandra Klemenschits / Patricia Mayr; Victoria Azarenka / Olga Govortsova	2; 6	5; 7

== Slovenia vs. Denmark ==
Slovenia
1
Coral Tennis Club, Tallinn, Estonia
6 February 2009
Greenset hard (indoors)

Denmark
2

			1	2	3
1	(Slovenia) (Denmark)	Maša Zec-Peškirič; Mai Grage	6; 4	7; 5
2	(Slovenia) (Denmark)	Andreja Klepač; Hanne Skak Jensen	6^{4} 7^{7}	3; 6
3	(Slovenia) (Denmark)	Andreja Klepač / Maša Zec-Peškirič; Eva Dyrberg / Hanne Skak Jensen	4; 6	2; 6

== See also ==
- Fed Cup structure
