= 2014 İstanbul Cup – Doubles =

Doubles
- 2014 İstanbul Cup

Final
- Champions: (Japan) Misaki Doi (Ukraine) Elina Svitolina
- Runners-up: (Georgia (country)) Oksana Kalashnikova (Poland) Paula Kania
- Score: 6–4, 6–0

Details
- Draw: 16
- Seeds: 4

Events
Singles	Doubles
- İstanbul Cup

Eleni Daniilidou and Jasmin Wöhr were the last champions of the event in 2010, but decided not to participate.
Misaki Doi and Elina Svitolina won the title, defeating Oksana Kalashnikova and Paula Kania in the final, 6–4, 6–0.

== Seeds ==
1. (Ukraine) Irina Buryachok / (Russia) Alla Kudryavtseva (first round)
2. (Czech Republic) Karolína Plíšková / (Czech Republic) Kristýna Plíšková (quarterfinals)
3. (Ukraine) Yuliya Beygelzimer / (Ukraine) Olga Savchuk (quarterfinals)
4. (Slovakia) Janette Husárová / (Poland) Klaudia Jans-Ignacik (semifinals)

== Draw ==
Key

- Q = Qualifier
- WC = Wild card
- LL = Lucky loser
- Alt = Alternate
- ITF = ITF entry
- PR = Protected ranking
- SR = Special ranking
- SE = Special exempt
- JE = Junior exempt
- JR = Junior Accelerator Programme entrant
- CO = College Accelerator Programme entrant
- NG = Next Gen Accelerator Program entrant
- w/o = Walkover
- r = Retired
- d = Defaulted

=== Draw ===
First round
1	(Ukraine) I Buryachok (Russia) A Kudryavtseva	3	6	[9]
(Israel) J Glushko (Austria) S Klemenschits	6	3	[11]
(Luxembourg) M Minella (Switzerland) S Vögele	6^{2}	2
(Japan) M Doi (Ukraine) E Svitolina	7^{7}	6
4	(Slovakia) J Husárová (Poland) K Jans-Ignacik	2	6	[12]
WC	(Turkey) M Sezer (Turkey) İ Soylu	6	1	[10]
(Austria) P Mayr-Achleitner (Czech Republic) T Smitková	3	3
WC	(Serbia) B Jovanovski (Italy) F Schiavone	6	6
(Ukraine) L Kichenok (Ukraine) N Kichenok	7^{7}	4	[8]
(Georgia (country)) O Kalashnikova (Poland) P Kania	6^{3}	6	[10]
(Romania) R Olaru (Israel) S Pe'er	0	2
3	(Ukraine) Y Beygelzimer (Ukraine) O Savchuk	6	6
(Russia) V Solovyeva (United States) A Tatishvili	6	7
(Ukraine) K Kozlova (Belarus) A Sasnovich	3	5
(Turkey) Ç Büyükakçay (Turkey) P Özgen	2	6	[5]
2	(Czech Republic) Ka Plíšková (Czech Republic) Kr Plíšková	6	3	[10]

Quarterfinals
(Israel) J Glushko (Austria) S Klemenschits	4	6^{5}
(Japan) M Doi (Ukraine) E Svitolina	6	7^{7}
4	(Slovakia) J Husárová (Poland) K Jans-Ignacik	6	5	[10]
WC	(Serbia) B Jovanovski (Italy) F Schiavone	2	7	[5]
(Georgia (country)) O Kalashnikova (Poland) P Kania	6	6
3	(Ukraine) Y Beygelzimer (Ukraine) O Savchuk	0	2
(Russia) V Solovyeva (United States) A Tatishvili	3	6	[11]
2	(Czech Republic) Ka Plíšková (Czech Republic) Kr Plíšková	6	4	[9]

Semifinals
(Japan) M Doi (Ukraine) E Svitolina	6^{4}	6	[10]
4	(Slovakia) J Husárová (Poland) K Jans-Ignacik	7^{7}	3	[6]
(Georgia (country)) O Kalashnikova (Poland) P Kania	6^{4}	6	[12]
(Russia) V Solovyeva (United States) A Tatishvili	7^{7}	4	[10]

Final
(Japan) M Doi (Ukraine) E Svitolina	6	6
(Georgia (country)) O Kalashnikova (Poland) P Kania	4	0
