= 2005 Fed Cup Europe/Africa Zone Group I – Pool D =

Group D of the 2005 Fed Cup Europe/Africa Zone Group I

Group D of the 2005 Fed Cup Europe/Africa Zone Group I was one of four pools in the Europe/Africa Zone Group I of the 2005 Fed Cup. Four teams competed in a round robin competition, with the top team and the bottom team proceeding to their respective sections of the play-offs: the top team played for advancement to the World Group II Play-offs, while the bottom team faced potential relegation to Group II.

		(Ukraine) UKR	(Israel) ISR	(Belarus) BLR	(Greece) GRE	RR; W–L	Set; W–L	Game; W–L	Standings
21	Ukraine		0–3	1–2	3–0	1–2	9–10	68–83	3
22	Israel	3–0		1–2	3–0	2–1	15–5	99–55	2
23	Belarus	2–1	2–1		3–0	3–0	14–4	96–64	1
52	Greece	0–3	0–3	0–3		0–3	0–18	50–111	4

== Ukraine vs. Greece ==
Ukraine
3
Club Ali Bey, Manavgat, Antalya, Turkey
20 April 2005
Red clay (outdoors)

Greece
0

			1	2	3
1	(Ukraine) (Greece)	Olga Savchuk; Anna Koumantou	6; 3	6; 4
2	(Ukraine) (Greece)	Alona Bondarenko; Anna Gerasimou	6; 1	6; 3
3	(Ukraine) (Greece)	Kateryna Bondarenko / Valeria Bondarenko; Asimina Kaplani / Anna Koumantou	6; 1	6; 2

== Israel vs. Belarus ==
Israel
1
Club Ali Bey, Manavgat, Antalya, Turkey
20 April 2005
Red clay (outdoors)

Belarus
2

			1	2	3
1	(Israel) (Belarus)	Shahar Pe'er; Victoria Azarenka	0; 6	5; 7
2	(Israel) (Belarus)	Anna Smashnova; Anastasiya Yakimova	6; 0	6; 1
3	(Israel) (Belarus)	Tzipora Obziler / Anna Smashnova; Victoria Azarenka / Tatiana Poutchek	5; 7	2; 6

== Ukraine vs. Belarus ==
Ukraine
1
Club Ali Bey, Manavgat, Antalya, Turkey
21 April 2005
Red clay (outdoors)

Belarus
2

			1	2	3
1	(Ukraine) (Belarus)	Kateryna Bondarenko; Victoria Azarenka	2; 6	1; 6
2	(Ukraine) (Belarus)	Alona Bondarenko; Anastasiya Yakimova	6; 2	7; 5
3	(Ukraine) (Belarus)	Valeria Bondarenko / Olga Savchuk; Victoria Azarenka / Tatiana Poutchek	3; 6	0; 6

== Israel vs. Greece ==
Israel
3
Club Ali Bey, Manavgat, Antalya, Turkey
21 April 2005
Red clay (outdoors)

Greece
0

			1	2	3
1	(Israel) (Greece)	Tzipora Obziler; Anastasia Michail	6; 1	6; 2
2	(Israel) (Greece)	Anna Smashnova; Anna Gerasimou	7; 5	6; 3
3	(Israel) (Greece)	Tzipora Obziler / Shahar Pe'er; Asimina Kaplani / Anna Koumantou	6; 3	6; 1

== Ukraine vs. Israel ==
Ukraine
0
Club Ali Bey, Manavgat, Antalya, Turkey
22 April 2005
Red clay (outdoors)

Israel
3

			1	2	3
1	(Ukraine) (Israel)	Valeria Bondarenko; Shahar Pe'er	2; 6	1; 6
2	(Ukraine) (Israel)	Alona Bondarenko; Anna Smashnova	6; 2	0; 6	1; 6
3	(Ukraine) (Israel)	Alona Bondarenko / Valeria Bondarenko; Tzipora Obziler / Shahar Pe'er	1; 6	2; 6

== Belarus vs. Greece ==
Belarus
3
Club Ali Bey, Manavgat, Antalya, Turkey
22 April 2005
Red clay (outdoors)

Greece
0

			1	2	3
1	(Belarus) (Greece)	Ekaterina Dzehalevich; Asimina Kaplani	6; 1	6; 4
2	(Belarus) (Greece)	Anastasiya Yakimova; Anna Gerasimou	6; 4	6; 1
3	(Belarus) (Greece)	Ekaterina Dzehalevich / Tatiana Poutchek; Asimina Kaplani / Anna Koumantou	7^{7} 6^{4}	7; 5

== See also ==
- Fed Cup structure
