= 2014 İstanbul Cup – Singles =

Singles
- 2014 İstanbul Cup

Final
- Champion: (Denmark) Caroline Wozniacki
- Runner-up: (Italy) Roberta Vinci
- Score: 6–1, 6–1

Details
- Draw: 32
- Seeds: 8

Events
Singles	Doubles
- İstanbul Cup

Anastasia Pavlyuchenkova was the champion when the event was last held in 2010, but she chose to participate in Båstad instead.

Caroline Wozniacki won the title, defeating Roberta Vinci in the final 6–1, 6–1.

== Seeds ==
1. (Denmark) Caroline Wozniacki (champion)
2. (Italy) Roberta Vinci (final)
3. (Czech Republic) Klára Koukalová (second round)
4. (Ukraine) Elina Svitolina (quarterfinals)
5. (Slovakia) Magdaléna Rybáriková (first round)
6. (Japan) Kurumi Nara (quarterfinals)
7. (Serbia) Bojana Jovanovski (second round)
8. (Czech Republic) Karolína Plíšková (quarterfinals)

== Draw ==
Key

- Q = Qualifier
- WC = Wild card
- LL = Lucky loser
- Alt = Alternate
- ITF = ITF entry
- PR = Protected ranking
- SR = Special ranking
- SE = Special exempt
- JE = Junior exempt
- JR = Junior Accelerator Programme entrant
- CO = College Accelerator Programme entrant
- NG = Next Gen Accelerator Program entrant
- w/o = Walkover
- r = Retired
- d = Defaulted

=== Finals ===
Semifinals
1/WC	(Denmark) Caroline Wozniacki	6	6
(France) Kristina Mladenovic	2	3
Q	(Croatia) Ana Konjuh	4	2
2	(Italy) Roberta Vinci	6	6

Final
1/WC	(Denmark) Caroline Wozniacki	6	6
2	(Italy) Roberta Vinci	1	1

=== Top half ===
First round
1/WC	(Denmark) C Wozniacki	6	6
(Switzerland) B Bencic	0	0
(Italy) K Knapp	6	6
WC	(Turkey) İ Soylu	2	2
(Israel) S Pe'er	1	6	6
Q	(Russia) E Kulichkova	6	1	4
WC	(Turkey) Ç Büyükakçay	4	6	0
8	(Czech Republic) Ka Plíšková	6	3	6
3	(Czech Republic) K Koukalová	4	6	6
(Croatia) D Vekić	6	0	4
(France) K Mladenovic	6	6
(Austria) P Mayr-Achleitner	4	2
(Italy) F Schiavone	6	6
(Serbia) J Jakšić	2	3
(Belgium) A Van Uytvanck	6	4	5
7	(Serbia) B Jovanovski	1	6	7

Second round
1/WC	(Denmark) C Wozniacki	4	6	6
(Italy) K Knapp	6	2	1
(Israel) S Pe'er	2	5
8	(Czech Republic) Ka Plíšková	6	7
3	(Czech Republic) K Koukalová	1	3
(France) K Mladenovic	6	6
(Italy) F Schiavone	6	6
7	(Serbia) B Jovanovski	1	4

Quarterfinals
1/WC	(Denmark) C Wozniacki	6	3	6
8	(Czech Republic) Ka Plíšková	1	6	2
(France) K Mladenovic	3	6	7
(Italy) F Schiavone	6	3	5

Semifinals
1/WC	(Denmark) C Wozniacki	6	6
(France) K Mladenovic	2	3

=== Bottom half ===
First round
5	(Slovakia) M Rybáriková	6	3	4
Q	(Croatia) A Konjuh	3	6	6
(Romania) M Niculescu	3^{r}
(Japan) M Doi	5
(Switzerland) S Vögele	6	7
(Bulgaria) T Pironkova	4	5
(Montenegro) D Kovinić	1	6	4
4	(Ukraine) E Svitolina	6	4	6
6	(Japan) K Nara	6	6
Q	(United Kingdom) J Konta	2	0
Q	(Czech Republic) K Siniaková	6	6
(Israel) J Glushko	2	4
Q	(Ukraine) K Kozlova	6	0	3
Q	(Romania) A Dulgheru	3	6	6
(United States) A Tatishvili	2	2
2	(Italy) R Vinci	6	6

Second round
Q	(Croatia) A Konjuh	6	6^{3}	6
(Japan) M Doi	4	7^{7}	4
(Switzerland) S Vögele	0	3
4	(Ukraine) E Svitolina	6	6
6	(Japan) K Nara	7^{7}	6^{3}	6
Q	(Czech Republic) K Siniaková	6^{5}	7^{7}	2
Q	(Romania) A Dulgheru	3	1^{r}
2	(Italy) R Vinci	6	4

Quarterfinals
Q	(Croatia) A Konjuh	6	1	6
4	(Ukraine) E Svitolina	4	6	1
6	(Japan) K Nara	0	2
2	(Italy) R Vinci	6	6

Semifinals
Q	(Croatia) A Konjuh	4	2
2	(Italy) R Vinci	6	6

== Qualifying ==
=== Seeds ===
1. (United Kingdom) Johanna Konta (qualified)
2. (Czech Republic) Kristýna Plíšková (qualifying competition)
3. (Romania) Alexandra Dulgheru (qualified)
4. (Czech Republic) Tereza Smitková (first round)
5. (Ukraine) Nadiia Kichenok (first round)
6. (Luxembourg) Mandy Minella (first round)
7. (Ukraine) Kateryna Kozlova (qualified)
8. (Czech Republic) Kateřina Siniaková (qualified)
9. (Russia) Alla Kudryavtseva (qualifying competition)
10. (Belarus) Aliaksandra Sasnovich (qualifying competition)
11. (Croatia) Ana Konjuh (qualified)
12. (Japan) Ayumi Morita (first round)

=== Qualifiers ===
1. (United Kingdom) Johanna Konta
2. (Croatia) Ana Konjuh
3. (Romania) Alexandra Dulgheru
4. (Ukraine) Kateryna Kozlova
5. (Russia) Elizaveta Kulichkova
6. (Czech Republic) Kateřina Siniaková

=== Draw ===
==== First qualifier ====
First round
1	(United Kingdom) Johanna Konta	6	6
WC	(Turkey) Melis Sezer	0	2
WC	(Turkey) Ayla Aksu	1	4
9	(Russia) Alla Kudryavtseva	6	6

Qualifying competition
1	(United Kingdom) Johanna Konta	6	6
9	(Russia) Alla Kudryavtseva	3	1

==== Second qualifier ====
First round
2	(Czech Republic) Kristýna Plíšková	6	6
WC	(Turkey) Pemra Özgen	3	4
(Kazakhstan) Sesil Karatantcheva	4	2
11	(Croatia) Ana Konjuh	6	6

Qualifying competition
2	(Czech Republic) Kristýna Plíšková	4	6	3
11	(Croatia) Ana Konjuh	6	3	6

==== Third qualifier ====
First round
3	(Romania) Alexandra Dulgheru	6	6
(Poland) Paula Kania	2	0
(Ukraine) Yuliya Beygelzimer	1	1
10	(Belarus) Aliaksandra Sasnovich	6	6

Qualifying competition
3	(Romania) Alexandra Dulgheru	6	7^{7}
10	(Belarus) Aliaksandra Sasnovich	3	6^{4}

==== Fourth qualifier ====
First round
4	(Czech Republic) Tereza Smitková	4	0
(Japan) Misa Eguchi	6	6
(Ukraine) Lyudmyla Kichenok	1	4
7	(Ukraine) Kateryna Kozlova	6	6

Qualifying competition
(Japan) Misa Eguchi	2	6	2
7	(Ukraine) Kateryna Kozlova	6	2	6

==== Fifth qualifier ====
First round
5	(Ukraine) Nadiia Kichenok	2	1
WC	(Russia) Elizaveta Kulichkova	6	6
PR	(Hungary) Melinda Czink	6^{4}	6	6
12	(Japan) Ayumi Morita	7^{7}	3	1

Qualifying competition
WC	(Russia) Elizaveta Kulichkova	6	6
PR	(Hungary) Melinda Czink	1	1

==== Sixth qualifier ====
First round
6	(Luxembourg) Mandy Minella	3	1
(Tunisia) Ons Jabeur	6	6
(Russia) Marta Sirotkina	4	6	3
8	(Czech Republic) Kateřina Siniaková	6	2	6

Qualifying competition
(Tunisia) Ons Jabeur	2	3
8	(Czech Republic) Kateřina Siniaková	6	6
