= Anna Brazhnikova =

Swedish tennis player (born 1991)

- Country (sports): Sweden
- Born: 4 October 1991 (age 34) Tashkent, Uzbekistan
- Height: 1.65 m (5 ft 5 in)
- Turned pro: 2007
- Plays: Right (two-handed backhand)
- Prize money: $25,796

Singles
- Career record: 57-65
- Career titles: 0
- Highest ranking: No. 421 (2 November 2009)

Doubles
- Career record: 45–37
- Career titles: 3 ITF
- Highest ranking: No. 309 (10 May 2010)

Anna Berta, formerly known as Anna Brazhnikova (born 4 October 1991), is a Swedish former tennis player.

She achieved the No. 1 position for Girls Under-18 in Sweden according to the January 2009 tennis rankings list published by the Swedish Tennis Federation.

In 2009, Anna reached four women's singles quarterfinals (twice as a qualifier) at ITF events ($10k) in Turkey and Egypt. She played her last match on the ITF Pro Circuit in July 2011 in Tampere, Finland.

== ITF Circuit finals ==
Legend
$25,000 tournaments
$10,000 tournaments

=== Singles (0–2) ===
Result	No.	Date	Tournament	Surface	Opponent	Score
Loss	1.	27 October 2008	ITF Stockholm, Sweden	Hard (i)	(Germany) Nicola Geuer	6–7, 6–1, 5–7
Loss	2.	1 November 2010	ITF Stockholm, Sweden	Hard	(Slovakia) Michaela Hončová	4–6, 7–6, 3–6

=== Doubles (3–5) ===
Result	No.	Date	Tournament	Surface	Partner	Opponents	Score
Loss	1.	19 May 2008	ITF Falkenberg, Sweden	Clay	(Sweden) Madeleine Saari-Bystrom	(Sweden) Diana Eriksson (Denmark) Hanne Skak Jensen	3–6, 1–6
Loss	2.	2 November 2008	ITF Stockholm, Sweden	Hard (i)	(Denmark) Malou Ejdesgaard	(Norway) Helene Auensen (Norway) Ulrikke Eikeri	2–6, 6–4, [8–10]
Win	1.	18 May 2009	ITF Ain Sukhna, Egypt	Clay	(Russia) Valeria Savinykh	(Russia) Galina Fokina (Russia) Anna Morgina	3–6, 6–3, [10–6]
Win	2.	1 June 2009	ITF Bukhara, Uzbekistan	Hard	(Russia) Marta Sirotkina	(Kyrgyzstan) Ksenia Palkina (Australia) Arina Rodionova	3–6, 6–4, [11–9]
Loss	3.	12 October 2009	Lagos Open, Nigeria	Hard	(Russia) Anastasia Mukhametova	(Russia) Nina Bratchikova (Greece) Anna Gerasimou	6–7, 6–7
Win	3.	5 April 2010	ITF Ain Sukhna, Egypt	Clay	(Russia) Marta Sirotkina	(France) Audrey Bergot (South Africa) Chanel Simmonds	6–3, 6–3
Loss	4.	18 October 2010	Lagos Open, Nigeria	Hard	(Russia) Anastasia Mukhametova	(Russia) Nina Bratchikova (Romania) Ágnes Szatmári	4–6, 3–6
Loss	5.	1 November 2010	ITF Stockholm, Sweden	Hard (i)	(Denmark) Karen Barbat	(Switzerland) Xenia Knoll (Switzerland) Lara Michel	3–6, 3–6
