= 2009 MPS Group Championships – Singles =

Singles
- 2009 MPS Group Championships

Final
- Champion: (Denmark) Caroline Wozniacki
- Runner-up: (Canada) Aleksandra Wozniak
- Score: 6–1, 6–2

Details
- Draw: 32 (4 Q / 3 WC )
- Seeds: 8

Events
| Singles | Doubles |
- Amelia Island Championships

Maria Sharapova was the defending champion, but could not compete due to a long-term shoulder injury.

Caroline Wozniacki beat Aleksandra Wozniak in the final, 6–1, 6–2.

== Seeds ==
1. (Russia) Nadia Petrova (semifinals)
2. (Denmark) Caroline Wozniacki (champion)
3. (Slovakia) Dominika Cibulková (quarterfinals)
4. (Switzerland) Patty Schnyder (first round)
5. (Canada) Aleksandra Wozniak (final)
6. (China) Peng Shuai (first round)
7. (Ukraine) Alona Bondarenko (quarterfinals)
8. (United States) Bethanie Mattek-Sands (second round)

== Draw ==
Key

- Q = Qualifier
- WC = Wild card
- LL = Lucky loser
- Alt = Alternate
- ITF = ITF entry
- PR = Protected ranking
- SR = Special ranking
- SE = Special exempt
- JE = Junior exempt
- JR = Junior Accelerator Programme entrant
- CO = College Accelerator Programme entrant
- NG = Next Gen Accelerator Program entrant
- w/o = Walkover
- r = Retired
- d = Defaulted

=== Finals ===
Semifinals
1 | (Russia) Nadia Petrova | 4 | 6 | 2
5 | (Canada) Aleksandra Wozniak | 6 | 4 | 6
(Russia) Elena Vesnina | 6 | 3 | 6^{5}
2 | (Denmark) Caroline Wozniacki | 2 | 6 | 7

Final
5 | (Canada) Aleksandra Wozniak | 1 | 2
2 | (Denmark) Caroline Wozniacki | 6 | 6

=== Top half ===
First round
1 | (Russia) N Petrova | 6 | 6
(Belarus) O Govortsova | 2 | 4
(Russia) A Kudryavtseva | 5 | 4
WC | (United States) M Keys | 7 | 6
(Czech Republic) B Záhlavová-Strýcová | 6^{2} | 2
(Ukraine) K Bondarenko | 7 | 6
(India) S Mirza | 4 | 3
7 | (Ukraine) A Bondarenko | 6 | 6
4 | (Switzerland) P Schnyder | 2 | 0
LL | (United States) V Lepchenko | 6 | 6
(Austria) T Paszek | 6^{5} | 6 | 6
(Hungary) M Czink | 7 | 4 | 4
(Germany) S Lisicki | 6 | 7
Q | (Ukraine) M Koryttseva | 3 | 6^{3}
(United States) J Craybas | 4 | 4
5 | (Canada) A Wozniak | 6 | 6

Second round
1 | (Russia) N Petrova | 6 | 6
WC | (United States) M Keys | 3 | 2
(Ukraine) K Bondarenko | 6 | 4 | 3
7 | (Ukraine) A Bondarenko | 4 | 6 | 6
LL | (United States) V Lepchenko | 6 | 3 | 4
(Austria) T Paszek | 3 | 6 | 6
(Germany) S Lisicki | 6 | 6^{3} | 4
5 | (Canada) A Wozniak | 3 | 7 | 6

Quarterfinals
1 | (Russia) N Petrova | 4 | 6 | 7
7 | (Ukraine) A Bondarenko | 6 | 3 | 6^{5}
(Austria) T Paszek | 3 | 6 | 6^{7}
5 | (Canada) A Wozniak | 6 | 3 | 7

Semifinals
1 | (Russia) N Petrova | 4 | 6 | 2
5 | (Canada) A Wozniak | 6 | 4 | 6

=== Bottom half ===
First round
6 | (China) S Peng | 6 | 1 | 3
(Russia) E Vesnina | 2 | 6 | 6
(Japan) A Morita | 3 | 6 | 3
(Austria) P Mayr | 6 | 2 | 6
Q | (Russia) A Rodionova | 6 | 6
(Kazakhstan) G Voskoboeva | 4 | 2
(Romania) E Gallovits | 2 | 2
3/WC | (Slovakia) D Cibulková | 6 | 6
8 | (United States) B Mattek-Sands | 5 | 7 | 6
Q | (France) M Bartoli | 7 | 6^{4} | 3
WC | (Slovakia) D Hantuchová | 2 | 6 | 7
Q | (Latvia) A Sevastova | 6 | 4 | 6^{5}
(France) V Razzano | 6 | 6
(Uzbekistan) A Amanmuradova | 2 | 4
(Australia) S Stosur | 3 | 7 | 1
2 | (Denmark) C Wozniacki | 6 | 6^{4} | 6

Second round
(Russia) E Vesnina | 1 | 6 | 6
(Austria) P Mayr | 6 | 3 | 2
Q | (Russia) A Rodionova | 1 | 3
3/WC | (Slovakia) D Cibulková | 6 | 6
8 | (United States) B Mattek-Sands | 3 | 5
WC | (Slovakia) D Hantuchová | 6 | 7
(France) V Razzano | 3 | 5
2 | (Denmark) C Wozniacki | 6 | 7

Quarterfinals
(Russia) E Vesnina | 7 | 6^{5} | 6
3/WC | (Slovakia) D Cibulková | 5 | 7 | 3
WC | (Slovakia) D Hantuchová | 2 | 2
2 | (Denmark) C Wozniacki | 6 | 6

Semifinals
(Russia) E Vesnina | 6 | 3 | 6^{5}
2 | (Denmark) C Wozniacki | 2 | 6 | 7
