= 2009 MPS Group Championships – Doubles =

Doubles
- 2009 MPS Group Championships

Final
- Champions: (Chinese Taipei) Chuang Chia-jung (India) Sania Mirza
- Runners-up: (Czech Republic) Květa Peschke (United States) Lisa Raymond
- Score: 6–3, 4–6, 10–7

Details
- Draw: 16 (1 WC )
- Seeds: 4

Events
Singles	Doubles
- Amelia Island Championships

Bethanie Mattek and Vladimíra Uhlířová were the defending champions, but Uhlířová chose not to participate this year, and only Mattek competed this year. She played alongside Nadia Petrova but lost in the Quarterfinals to Chuang Chia-jung and Sania Mirza.

Chuang and Mirza reached the final where they beat Květa Peschke and Lisa Raymond to win their title.

== Seeds ==
1. (Czech Republic) Květa Peschke / (United States) Lisa Raymond (final)
2. (China) Peng Shuai / (China) Yan Zi (quarterfinals)
3. (Ukraine) Alyona Bondarenko / (Ukraine) Kateryna Bondarenko (quarterfinals, retired due to Kateryna's injury of right forearm strain)
4. (United States) Bethanie Mattek-Sands / (Russia) Nadia Petrova (quarterfinals)

== Draw ==
Key

- Q = Qualifier
- WC = Wild card
- LL = Lucky loser
- Alt = Alternate
- ITF = ITF entry
- PR = Protected ranking
- SR = Special ranking
- SE = Special exempt
- JE = Junior exempt
- JR = Junior Accelerator Programme entrant
- CO = College Accelerator Programme entrant
- NG = Next Gen Accelerator Program entrant
- w/o = Walkover
- r = Retired
- d = Defaulted

=== Finals ===
First round
1	(Czech Republic) K Peschke (United States) L Raymond	5	6	[10]
(United States) R Kops-Jones (United States) A Spears	7	4	[2]
(Chinese Taipei) C-w Chan (United States) C Gullickson	6^{3}	6	[10]
(Uzbekistan) A Amanmuradova (Ukraine) O Savchuk	7	2	[7]
3	(Ukraine) A Bondarenko (Ukraine) K Bondarenko	6	7
(Ukraine) M Koryttseva (Russia) A Kudryavtseva	1	6^{4}
(Denmark) C Wozniacki (Czech Republic) B Záhlavová-Strýcová	6	1	[10]
(United States) J Craybas (United States) M Washington	2	6	[7]
(Hungary) M Czink (United States) L Osterloh	0	6	[5]
(Chinese Taipei) C-j Chuang (India) S Mirza	6	3	[10]
(Russia) A Rodionova (Kazakhstan) G Voskoboeva	4	5
4	(United States) B Mattek-Sands (Russia) N Petrova	6	7
WC	(United States) C Fusano (United States) A Glatch	6	4	[4]
(Latvia) L Dekmeijere (United States) A Haynes	1	6	[10]
(Romania) E Gallovits (Belarus) O Govortseva	6	2	[3]
2	(China) S Peng (China) Z Yan	4	6	[10]

Quarterfinals
1	(Czech Republic) K Peschke (United States) L Raymond	6	7
(Chinese Taipei) C-W Chan (United States) C Gullickson	0	5
3	(Ukraine) A Bondarenko (Ukraine) K Bondarenko
(Denmark) C Wozniacki (Czech Republic) B Záhlavová-Strýcová	w/o
(Chinese Taipei) C-j Chuang (India) S Mirza	6	7
4	(United States) B Mattek-Sands (Russia) N Petrova	4	5
(Latvia) L Dekmeijere (United States) A Haynes	7	6
2	(China) S Peng (China) Z Yan	6^{3}	4

Semifinals
1	(Czech Republic) K Peschke (United States) L Raymond	4	7	[15]
(Denmark) C Wozniacki (Czech Republic) B Záhlavová-Strýcová	6	5	[13]
(Chinese Taipei) C-j Chuang (India) S Mirza	6	6
(Latvia) L Dekmeijere (United States) A Haynes	4	3

Final
1	(Czech Republic) K Peschke (United States) L Raymond	3	6	[7]
(Chinese Taipei) C-j Chuang (India) S Mirza	6	4	[10]
