= 2010 MPS Group Championships – Singles =

Singles
- 2010 MPS Group Championships

Final
- Champion: (Denmark) Caroline Wozniacki
- Runner-up: (Belarus) Olga Govortsova
- Score: 6–2, 7–5

Details
- Draw: 32 (4 Q / 3 WC )
- Seeds: 8

Events
| Singles | Doubles |
- Amelia Island Championships

Caroline Wozniacki was the defending champion, and successfully defended her title, defeating Olga Govortsova in the final 6–2, 7–5.

== Seeds ==
1. (Denmark) Caroline Wozniacki (champion)
2. (Ukraine) Alona Bondarenko (first round)
3. (Slovakia) Dominika Cibulková (semifinals)
4. (Russia) Elena Vesnina (semifinals)
5. (Russia) Anastasia Pavlyuchenkova (quarterfinals)
6. (Canada) Aleksandra Wozniak (quarterfinals)
7. (France) Virginie Razzano (withdrew due to a right foot injury)
8. (United States) Melanie Oudin (quarterfinals)

== Draw ==
Key

- Q = Qualifier
- WC = Wild card
- LL = Lucky loser
- Alt = Alternate
- ITF = ITF entry
- PR = Protected ranking
- SR = Special ranking
- SE = Special exempt
- JE = Junior exempt
- JR = Junior Accelerator Programme entrant
- CO = College Accelerator Programme entrant
- NG = Next Gen Accelerator Program entrant
- w/o = Walkover
- r = Retired
- d = Defaulted

=== Finals ===
Semifinals
1 | (Denmark) Caroline Wozniacki | 1 | 7 | 6
4 | (Russia) Elena Vesnina | 6 | 6^{4} | 4
3 | (Slovakia) Dominika Cibulková | 4 | 5
(Belarus) Olga Govortsova | 6 | 7

Final
1 | (Denmark) Caroline Wozniacki | 6 | 7
(Belarus) Olga Govortsova | 2 | 5

=== Top half ===
First round
1 | (Denmark) C Wozniacki | 6 | 6
(Switzerland) P Schnyder | 0 | 4
(Sweden) S Arvidsson | 6 | 6
WC | (United States) C Gullickson | 0 | 2
(Australia) A Rodionova | 2 | 7 | 5
Q | (United States) B Mattek-Sands | 6 | 6^{4} | 7
(Russia) E Makarova | 5 | 7 | 4
5 | (Russia) A Pavlyuchenkova | 7 | 5 | 6
4 | (Russia) E Vesnina | 6 | 6
Q | (Australia) S Ferguson | 2 | 3
(Germany) J Görges | 7 | 5 | 6
(Czech Republic) B Záhlavová-Strýcová | 5 | 7 | 4
(China) S Peng | 6 | 6
(Chinese Taipei) K-c Chang | 4 | 2
(Paraguay) R de los Ríos | 5 | 2
8 | (United States) M Oudin | 7 | 6

Second round
1 | (Denmark) C Wozniacki | 6 | 6
(Sweden) S Arvidsson | 3 | 1
Q | (United States) B Mattek-Sands | 6^{4} | 6 | 2
5 | (Russia) A Pavlyuchenkova | 7 | 4 | 6
4 | (Russia) E Vesnina | 6 | 6
(Germany) J Görges | 3 | 2
(China) S Peng | 6 | 5 | 5
8 | (United States) M Oudin | 2 | 7 | 7

Quarterfinals
1 | (Denmark) C Wozniacki | 6 | 6
5 | (Russia) A Pavlyuchenkova | 1 | 3
4 | (Russia) E Vesnina | 6 | 6
8 | (United States) M Oudin | 2 | 1

Semifinals
1 | (Denmark) C Wozniacki | 1 | 7 | 6
4 | (Russia) E Vesnina | 6 | 6^{4} | 4

=== Bottom half ===
First round
6 | (Canada) A Wozniak | 6 | 6
WC | (United States) S Stephens | 4 | 3
WC | (Japan) A Morita | 6 | 2 | 6
Q | (Kazakhstan) S Karatantcheva | 3 | 6 | 2
(Russia) A Kudryavtseva | 6 | 6
(United States) J Craybas | 1 | 4
(Hungary) M Czink | 1 | 4
3 | (Slovakia) D Cibulková | 6 | 6
LL | (United States) V Lepchenko | 6 | 7
(Colombia) M Duque Mariño | 1 | 6^{2}
(Germany) A Kerber | 6 | 6
(United States) V King | 2 | 3
(Slovakia) M Rybáriková | 3 | 6 | 5
Q | (Georgia (country)) A Tatishvili | 6 | 3 | 7
(Belarus) O Govortsova | 6 | 4 | 6
2 | (Ukraine) A Bondarenko | 3 | 6 | 0

Second round
6 | (Canada) A Wozniak | 2 | 6 | 6
WC | (Japan) A Morita | 6 | 3 | 2
(Russia) A Kudryavtseva | 3 | 3
3 | (Slovakia) D Cibulková | 6 | 6
LL | (United States) V Lepchenko | 6 | 6
(Germany) A Kerber | 1 | 1
Q | (Georgia (country)) A Tatishvili | 2 | 2
(Belarus) O Govortsova | 6 | 6

Quarterfinals
6 | (Canada) A Wozniak | 5 | 1
3 | (Slovakia) D Cibulková | 7 | 6
LL | (United States) V Lepchenko | 3 | 2
(Belarus) O Govortsova | 6 | 6

Semifinals
3 | (Slovakia) D Cibulková | 4 | 5
(Belarus) O Govortsova | 6 | 7
