= Sousan Massi =

Swedish tennis player

- Full name: Sousan Massi Nylander
- Country (sports): Sweden
- Born: 31 July 1989 (age 36)
- Plays: Right-handed

Singles
- Highest ranking: No. 773 (Nov 21, 2005)

Sousan Massi Nylander (born 31 July 1989) is a Swedish former professional tennis player.

A promising junior, Massi comes from Norrköping and was named "Sports Girl of the Year" by the city's sports association in 2002. She was ranked number one nationality in the under 16s.

Massi stopped competing after her junior years, with her occasional professional appearances giving her a best world ranking of 773. In 2005 she beat Francesca Lubiani in qualifying at Stockholm's Nordic Light Open and in the same year became Sweden's youngest ever Fed Cup representative, featuring in a tie against South Africa aged 15.

== See also ==
- List of Sweden Fed Cup team representatives
