= Hanne Skak Jensen =

Danish tennis player

- Country (sports): Denmark
- Residence: Skanderborg, Denmark
- Born: 29 April 1986 (age 38); Skanderborg
- Height: 1.61 m (5 ft 3 1/2 in)
- Turned pro: 2005
- Plays: Right-handed (two-handed backhand)
- Prize money: $32,679

Singles
- Career record: 93–70
- Career titles: 0
- Highest ranking: No. 338 (20 July 2009)

Doubles
- Career record: 89–54
- Career titles: 9 ITF
- Highest ranking: No. 205 (2 November 2009)

Team competitions
- Fed Cup: 8–12

Hanne Skak Jensen (born 29 April 1986) is a Danish former tennis player.

She was Danish No. 2, behind then-world No. 1 Caroline Wozniacki. Jensen won nine doubles events organized by the International Tennis Federation, and was a regular member of Denmark Fed Cup team. Playing for Denmark, she scored two wins and seven losses in singles, and six wins and five losses in doubles.

Hanne Skak Jensen was born to Erik and Karen Jensen, and has a brother, Soren. She began playing tennis aged six and was coached by Michael Mortensen.

== ITF finals ==
=== Singles: 5 (0–5) ===
Legend
$100,000 tournaments
$75,000 tournaments
$50,000 tournaments
$25,000 tournaments
$10,000 tournaments

| Outcome | No. | Date | Tournament | Surface | Opponent | Score |
|---|---|---|---|---|---|---|
| Runner-up | 1. | 28 July 2007 | Gausdal, Norway | Hard | (Russia) Elizaveta Tochilovskaya | 4–6, 2–6 |
| Runner-up | 2. | 5 August 2007 | Tampere, Finland | Clay | (Latvia) Alise Vaidere | 4–6, 1–6 |
| Runner-up | 3. | 25 May 2008 | Falkenberg, Sweden | Clay | (Sweden) Kristina Andlovic | 5–7, 5–7 |
| Runner-up | 4. | 3 August 2008 | Tampere, Finland | Clay | (Slovakia) Martina Balogová | 3–6, 6–2, 0–6 |
| Runner-up | 5. | 10 August 2008 | Savitaipale, Finland | Clay | (Slovakia) Martina Balogová | 2–6, 2–6 |

=== Doubles: 16 (9–7) ===
| Outcome | No. | Date | Tournament | Surface | Partner | Opponents | Score |
|---|---|---|---|---|---|---|---|
| Runner-up | 1. | 7 November 2004 | Mallorca, Spain | Clay | (Denmark) Karina Jacobsgaard | (Spain) Estrella Cabeza Candela (Spain) Adriana González Peñas | 3–6, 3–6 |
| Runner-up | 2. | 14 November 2004 | Mallorca, Spain | Clay | (Denmark) Karina Jacobsgaard | (Slovenia) Alja Zec Peškirič (Slovenia) Maša Zec Peškirič | 0–6, 6–2, 3–6 |
| Runner-up | 3. | 14 July 2006 | Birkerod, Denmark | Clay | (Denmark) Karina Jacobsgaard | (Germany) Julia Paetow (Germany) Anne Schäfer | 5–7, 1–6 |
| Winner | 1. | 5 November 2006 | Stockholm, Sweden | Hard (i) | (Sweden) Diana Eriksson | (Finland) Piia Suomalainen (Finland) Katariina Tuohimaa | w/o |
| Winner | 2. | 13 July 2007 | Brussels, Belgium | Clay | (Argentina) Verónica Spiegel | (Netherlands) Marcella Koek (Netherlands) Claire Lablans | 6–2, 6–1 |
| Runner-up | 4. | 4 August 2007 | Tampere, Finland | Clay | (Netherlands) Marcella Koek | (Finland) Piia Suomalainen (Finland) Katariina Tuohimaa | 2–6, 4–6 |
| Runner-up | 5. | 1 September 2007 | Enschede, Netherlands | Clay | (Norway) Karoline Steiro | (Netherlands) Claire Lablans (Netherlands) Leonie Mekel | 6–7^{(3–7)}, 6–7^{(6–8)} |
| Runner-up | 6. | 4 November 2007 | Stockholm, Sweden | Hard (i) | (Sweden) Diana Eriksson | (Sweden) Johanna Larsson (Sweden) Nadja Roma | 7–6^{(7–2)}, 3–6, [6–10] |
| Runner-up | 7. | 1 May 2008 | Olecko, Poland | Clay | (Sweden) Annie Goransson | (Poland) Olga Brózda (Poland) Magdalena Kiszczyńska | 4–6, 2–6 |
| Winner | 3. | 24 May 2008 | Falkenberg, Sweden | Clay | (Sweden) Diana Eriksson | (Sweden) Anna Brazhnikova (Sweden) Madeleine Saari-Bystrom | 6–3, 6–1 |
| Winner | 4. | 3 August 2008 | Tampere, Finland | Hard | (Sweden) Diana Eriksson | (Sweden) Annie Goransson (Sweden) Caroline Magnusson | 6–4, 6–0 |
| Winner | 5. | 10 August 2008 | Savitaipale, Finland | Hard | (Belgium) Davinia Lobbinger | (Latvia) Diāna Marcinkēviča (Russia) Ekaterina Prozorova | 6–1, 6–3 |
| Winner | 6. | 11 April 2009 | Antalya, Turkey | Hard | (United Kingdom) Anna Fitzpatrick | (Georgia (country)) Sofia Kvatsabaia (Russia) Avgusta Tsybysheva | 7–6^{(7–3)}, 2–6, [10–7] |
| Winner | 7. | 6 June 2009 | Sarajevo, Bosnia-Herzegovina | Clay | (Poland) Karolina Kosińska | (Russia) Yuliya Kalabina (Russia) Anastasia Poltoratskaya | 7–6^{(7–4)}, 6–2 |
| Winner | 8. | 27 June 2009 | Kristinehamn, Sweden | Clay | (Sweden) Johanna Larsson | (Sweden) Sofia Arvidsson (Sweden) Sandra Roma | 7–6^{(7–5)}, 6–2 |
| Winner | 9. | 2 August 2009 | Bad Saulgau, Germany | Clay | (Sweden) Johanna Larsson | (Croatia) Darija Jurak (Japan) Yurika Sema | 6–2, 6–3 |
