= Karina Jacobsgaard =

Danish tennis player

- Full name: Karina Ildor Jacobsgaard
- Country (sports): Denmark
- Born: 1 January 1980 (age 45); Denmark
- Prize money: $27,461

Singles
- Career record: 108–88
- Career titles: 3 ITF
- Highest ranking: 432 (27 May 2002)

Doubles
- Career record: 49–50
- Career titles: 1 ITF
- Highest ranking: 463 (20 May 2002)

Team competitions
- Fed Cup: 13–25

Karina Ildor Jacobsgaard (born 1 January 1980) is a Danish former tennis player.

In her career, she won three singles titles and one doubles title on the ITF Circuit. On 27 May 2002, she reached her best singles ranking of world No. 432. On 20 May 2002, she peaked at No. 463 in the WTA doubles rankings.

Jacobsgaard has a 13–25 record for Denmark in Fed Cup competition.

== ITF Circuit finals ==
=== Singles: 5 (3 titles, 2 runner-ups) ===
Legend $100,000 tournaments $75,000 tournaments $50,000 tournaments $25,000 tournaments $10,000 tournaments	Finals by surface Hard (0–1) Clay (3–1) Grass (0–0) Carpet (0–0)

Result	No.	Date	Tournament	Surface	Opponent	Score
Loss	1	3 September 2001	ITF Chieti, Italy	Clay	(Slovakia) Zuzana Zemenová	6–2, 6–7^{(2–7)}, 2–6
Win	2	24 September 2001	ITF Kastoria, Greece	Clay	(Greece) Maria Pavlidou	6–1, 6–1
Loss	3	21 January 2002	ITF Båstad, Sweden	Hard (i)	(Hungary) Eszter Molnár	7–6^{(7–5)}, 4–6, 0–6
Win	4	1 September 2003	ITF Ben Aknoun, Algeria	Clay	(Austria) Jennifer Schmidt	6–4, 3–6, 6–2
Win	5	4 July 2005	ITF Le Touquet, France	Clay	(France) Diana Brunel	6–0, 6–0

=== Doubles: 6 (1 title, 5 runner-ups) ===
Legend $100,000 tournaments $75,000 tournaments $50,000 tournaments $25,000 tournaments $10,000 tournaments	Finals by surface Hard (1–0) Clay (0–5) Grass (0–0) Carpet (0–0)

Result	No.	Date	Tournament	Surface	Partner	Opponents	Score
Loss	1	28 January 2002	ITF Mallorca, Spain	Clay	(Ukraine) Irena Nossenko	(Austria) Jennifer Schmidt (Sweden) Maria Wolfbrandt	6–7^{(3–7)}, 5–7
Loss	2	1 September 2003	ITF Ben Aknoun, Algeria	Clay	(Norway) Ina Sartz	(Hungary) Barbara Pócza (Hungary) Petra Teller	6–3, 4–6, 4–6
Win	3	30 August 2004	ITF Mollerussa, Spain	Hard	(France) Emilie Trouche	(Germany) Sabine Lisicki (France) Nelly Maillard	w/o
Loss	4	1 November 2004	ITF Mallorca, Spain	Clay	(Denmark) Hanne Skak Jensen	(Spain) Estrella Cabeza Candela (Spain) Adriana González Peñas	3–6, 3–6
Loss	4.	8 November 2004	ITF Mallorca, Spain	Clay	(Denmark) Hanne Skak Jensen	(Slovenia) Alja Zec Peškirič (Slovenia) Maša Zec Peškirič	0–6, 6–2, 3–6
Loss	5.	10 July 2006	ITF Birkerod, Denmark	Clay	(Denmark) Hanne Skak Jensen	(Germany) Julia Paetow (Germany) Anne Schäfer	5–7, 1–6
