= 2011 Fed Cup Europe/Africa Zone Group III – play-offs =

International tennis competition play-offs

The play-offs of the 2011 Fed Cup Europe/Africa Zone Group III were the final stages of the Group III Zonal Competition involving teams from Europe and Africa. Using the positions determined in their pools, the seven teams faced off to determine their placing in the 2011 Fed Cup Europe/Africa Zone Group III. The top two teams advanced to Fed Cup Europe/Africa Zone Group II.

Placing	Pool A	Pool B
1	South Africa	Tunisia
2	Montenegro	Egypt
3	Lithuania	Norway
4	Algeria	Ireland
5		Moldova

== Promotion play-offs ==
The first placed teams of each pool played against the second-placed teams of the other pool in head-to-head rounds. The winner of each round advanced to the 2012 Europe/Africa Zone Group II.

=== South Africa vs. Egypt ===
South Africa
3
Smash Tennis Academy, Cairo, Egypt
May 7, 2011
Red clay (outdoors)

Egypt
0

			1	2	3
1	(South Africa) (Egypt)	Natalie Grandin; Mayar Sherif	6; 1	6; 1
2	(South Africa) (Egypt)	Chanel Simmonds; Magy Aziz	6; 2	6; 1
3	(South Africa) (Egypt)	Natasha Fourouclas / Madrie Le Roux; Menna El Kamash / Mayar Sherif	5; 7	6; 4	10; 6

=== Tunisia vs. Montenegro ===
Tunisia
0
Smash Tennis Academy, Cairo, Egypt
May 7, 2011
Red clay (outdoors)

Montenegro
2

			1	2	3
1	(Tunisia) (Montenegro)	Nour Abbès; Danica Krstajić	6; 4	5; 7	4; 6
2	(Tunisia) (Montenegro)	Ons Jabeur; Danka Kovinić	3; 6	2; 6
3	(Tunisia) (Montenegro)	Nour Abbès / Ons Jabeur; Danka Kovinić / Danica Krstajić				not played

== Final Placements ==
Placing	Teams	
Promoted	South Africa	Montenegro
Third	Egypt	Tunisia
Fifth	Lithuania	Norway
Seventh	Algeria	Ireland
Ninth	Moldova	

- South Africa and Montenegro were promoted to Europe/Africa Zone Group II for 2012. They placed first and second in the same pool, and thus advanced to the promotional play-offs. Both teams, however, lost their matches and thus remained in Group II for 2013.

== See also ==
- Fed Cup structure
