= 2012 Fed Cup Europe/Africa Zone Group II – Pool A =

International tennis competition

Group A of the 2012 Fed Cup Europe/Africa Zone Group II was one of two pools in the Europe/Africa Zone Group II of the 2012 Fed Cup. Four teams competed in a round robin competition, with the top team and the bottom team proceeding to their respective sections of the play-offs: the top teams played for advancement to Group I, while the bottom team faced potential relegation to Group III.

| | | (Finland) FIN | (South Africa) RSA | (Denmark) DEN | (Montenegro) MNE | RR; W–L | Set; W–L | Game; W–L | Standings |
| 53 | Finland | | 0–3 | 2–1 | 0–3 | 1–2 | 6–15 | 78–114 | 3 |
| 59 | South Africa | 3–0 | | 3–0 | 3–0 | 3–0 | 18–1 | 117–61 | 1 |
| 67 | Denmark | 1–2 | 0–3 | | 1–2 | 0–3 | 6–14 | 86–107 | 4 |
| 78 | Montenegro | 3–0 | 0–3 | 2–1 | | 2–1 | 10–10 | 95–94 | 2 |

== Finland vs. Montenegro ==
Finland
0
Golf El Solaimaneyah Club, Cairo, Egypt
18 April 2012
Red clay (outdoors)

Montenegro
3

| | | | 1 | 2 | 3 |
|---|---|---|---|---|---|
| 1 | (Finland) (Montenegro) | Ella Leivo; Vladica Babić | 2; 6 | 7^{7} 6^{5} | 1; 6 |
| 2 | (Finland) (Montenegro) | Piia Suomalainen; Danka Kovinić | 6; 4 | 4; 6 | 4; 6 |
| 3 | (Finland) (Montenegro) | Johanna Hyöty / Emma Laine; Danka Kovinić / Danica Krstajić | 6^{4} 7^{7} | 3; 6 |

== South Africa vs. Denmark ==
South Africa
3
Golf El Solaimaneyah Club, Cairo, Egypt
18 April 2012
Red clay (outdoors)

Denmark
0

| | | | 1 | 2 | 3 |
|---|---|---|---|---|---|
| 1 | (South Africa) (Denmark) | Ilze Hattingh; Mai Grage | 7^{7} 6^{1} | 5; 7 | 6; 0 |
| 2 | (South Africa) (Denmark) | Natalie Grandin; Karen Barbat | 7^{7} 6^{4} | 6; 4 |
| 3 | (South Africa) (Denmark) | Natalie Grandin / Madrie Le Roux; Malou Ejdesgaard / Mai Grage | 7; 5 | 6; 3 |

== Finland vs. South Africa ==
Finland
0
Golf El Solaimaneyah Club, Cairo, Egypt
19 April 2012
Red clay (outdoors)

South Africa
3

| | | | 1 | 2 | 3 |
|---|---|---|---|---|---|
| 1 | (Finland) (South Africa) | Johanna Hyöty; Ilze Hattingh | 2; 6 | 1; 6 |
| 2 | (Finland) (South Africa) | Piia Suomalainen; Natalie Grandin | 4; 6 | 3; 6 |
| 3 | (Finland) (South Africa) | Johanna Hyöty / Ella Leivo; Natalie Grandin / Madrie le Roux | 0; 6 | 1; 6 |

== Denmark vs. Montenegro ==
Denmark
1
Golf El Solaimaneyah Club, Cairo, Egypt
19 April 2012
Red clay (outdoors)

Montenegro
2

| | | | 1 | 2 | 3 |
|---|---|---|---|---|---|
| 1 | (Denmark) (Montenegro) | Mai Grage; Vladica Babić | 6; 3 | 6; 2 |
| 2 | (Denmark) (Montenegro) | Karen Barbat; Danka Kovinić | 1; 6 | 3; 6 |
| 3 | (Denmark) (Montenegro) | Malou Ejdesgaard / Mai Grage; Danka Kovinić / Danica Krstajić | 4; 6 | 4; 6 |

== Finland vs. Denmark ==
Finland
2
Golf El Solaimaneyah Club, Cairo, Egypt
20 April 2012
Red clay (outdoors)

Denmark
1

| | | | 1 | 2 | 3 |
|---|---|---|---|---|---|
| 1 | (Finland) (Denmark) | Ella Leivo; Mai Grage | 2; 6 | 3; 6 |
| 2 | (Finland) (Denmark) | Piia Suomalainen; Karen Barbat | 6; 2 | 6; 4 |
| 3 | (Finland) (Denmark) | Emma Laine / Piia Suomalainen; Karen Barbat / Malou Ejdesgaard | 6; 2 | 4; 6 | 7; 5 |

== South Africa vs. Montenegro ==
South Africa
3
Golf El Solaimaneyah Club, Cairo, Egypt
20 April 2012
Red clay (outdoors)

Montenegro
0

| | | | 1 | 2 | 3 |
|---|---|---|---|---|---|
| 1 | (South Africa) (Montenegro) | Ilze Hattingh; Vladica Babić | 6; 2 | 6; 4 |
| 2 | (South Africa) (Montenegro) | Natalie Grandin; Danka Kovinić | 6; 4 | 7^{7} 6^{2} |
| 3 | (South Africa) (Montenegro) | Lynn Kiro / Madrie Le Roux; Vladica Babić / Milica Šljukić | 6; 1 | 6; 2 |

== See also ==
- Fed Cup structure
