= 2013 Fed Cup Europe/Africa Zone Group II – Pool B =

Group B of the 2013 Fed Cup Europe/Africa Zone Group II was one of two pools in the Europe/Africa zone of the 2013 Fed Cup. Four teams competed in a round-robin competition, with the top team and the bottom team proceeding to their respective sections of the play-offs: the top team played for advancement to Group I, while the bottom team faced potential relegation to Group III.

== Standings ==
		(South Africa) RSA	(Greece) GRE	(Montenegro) MNE	(Lithuania) LTU	RR; W–L	Match; W–L	Set; W–L	Game; W–L	Standings
53	South Africa		2–1	1–2	1–2	1–2	4–5	10–11	87–94	3
54	Greece	1–2		1–2	1–2	0–3	3–6	8–12	77–96	4
65	Montenegro	2–1	2–1		3–0	3–0	7–2	15–6	102–71	1
71	Lithuania	2–1	2–1	0–3		2–1	4–5	9–13	86–91	2

== Round-robin ==
=== South Africa vs. Lithuania ===
South Africa
1
Bellevue Club, Ulcinj, Montenegro
17 April 2013
Red clay (outdoors)

Lithuania
2

			1	2	3
1	(South Africa) (Lithuania)	Lynn Kiro; Justina Mikulskytė	3; 6	1; 6
2	(South Africa) (Lithuania)	Chanel Simmonds; Lina Stančiūtė	6; 3	2; 6	0; 6
3	(South Africa) (Lithuania)	Natalie Grandin / Madrie le Roux; Agnė Čepelytė / Joana Eidukonytė	6; 4	6; 2

=== Greece vs. Montenegro ===
Greece
1
Bellevue Club, Ulcinj, Montenegro
17 April 2013
Red clay (outdoors)

Montenegro
2

			1	2	3
1	(Greece) (Montenegro)	Despina Papamichail; Ana Veselinović	6; 1	6; 2
2	(Greece) (Montenegro)	Maria Sakkari; Danka Kovinić	2; 6	3; 6
3	(Greece) (Montenegro)	Despina Papamichail / Despoina Vogasari; Danka Kovinić / Danica Krstajić	0; 6	6^{13} 7^{15}

=== South Africa vs. Montenegro ===
South Africa
1
Bellevue Club, Ulcinj, Montenegro
18 April 2013
Red clay (outdoors)

Montenegro
2

			1	2	3
1	(South Africa) (Montenegro)	Natalie Grandin; Vladica Babić	6; 1	3; 6	6; 0
2	(South Africa) (Montenegro)	Chanel Simmonds; Danka Kovinić	1; 6	0; 6
3	(South Africa) (Montenegro)	Natalie Grandin / Madrie le Roux; Danka Kovinić / Danica Krstajić	4; 6	7^{7} 6^{2}	3; 6

=== Greece vs. Lithuania ===
Greece
1
Bellevue Club, Ulcinj, Montenegro
18 April 2013
Red clay (outdoors)

Lithuania
2

			1	2	3
1	(Greece) (Lithuania)	Despina Papamichail; Justina Mikulskytė	6; 1	6; 1
2	(Greece) (Lithuania)	Maria Sakkari; Lina Stančiūtė	7; 5	2; 6	1; 6
3	(Greece) (Lithuania)	Despina Papamichail / Despoina Vogasari; Justina Mikulskytė / Lina Stančiūtė	6; 4	0; 6	2; 6

=== South Africa vs. Greece ===
South Africa
2
Bellevue Club, Ulcinj, Montenegro
19 April 2013
Red clay (outdoors)

Greece
1

			1	2	3
1	(South Africa) (Greece)	Natalie Grandin; Despina Papamichail	3; 6	6^{13} 7^{15}
2	(South Africa) (Greece)	Chanel Simmonds; Maria Sakkari	6; 3	6; 0
3	(South Africa) (Greece)	Natalie Grandin / Madrie le Roux; Despina Papamichail / Despoina Vogasari	6; 4	6; 4

=== Montenegro vs. Lithuania ===
Montenegro
3
Bellevue Club, Ulcinj, Montenegro
19 April 2013
Red clay (outdoors)

Lithuania
0

			1	2	3
1	(Montenegro) (Lithuania)	Ana Veselinović; Justina Mikulskytė	6; 1	1; 6	6; 4
2	(Montenegro) (Lithuania)	Vladica Babić; Joana Eidukonytė	6; 0	6; 4
3	(Montenegro) (Lithuania)	Danka Kovinić / Danica Krstajić; Agnė Čepelytė / Joana Eidukonytė	6; 3	6; 0
