= Mai Grage =

Danish tennis player

- Country (sports): Denmark
- Residence: Kongens Lyngby, Denmark
- Born: 18 April 1992 (age 33) Kongens Lyngby
- Plays: Right-handed (two-handed backhand)
- Prize money: $5,637

Singles
- Career record: 11–10
- Career titles: 1 ITF
- Highest ranking: 861 (13 April 2015)

Doubles
- Career record: 5–9
- Career titles: 0
- Highest ranking: 988 (29 November 2010)

Team competitions
- Fed Cup: 14–16

Mai Grage (born 18 April 1992) is a Danish former professional tennis player.

She has a WTA career-high singles ranking of 861, achieved on 13 April 2015, and a WTA career-high doubles ranking of 988, set on 29 November 2010. Grage reached a junior career-high ranking of 30 and the 2010 French Open girls' doubles semifinals.

She made her WTA main-draw debut at the 2010 Danish Open in the doubles draw where she partnered Karen Barbat, losing in the first round. Grage then made further appearances in WTA main doubles draws in 2011 and 2012.

Playing for Denmark in Fed Cup, Grage achieved a win–loss record of 14–16.

== ITF Circuit finals ==
=== Singles: 1 (title) ===
| Legend $100,000 tournaments $75,000 tournaments $50,000 tournaments $25,000 tournaments $10,000 tournaments | Finals by surface Hard (0–0) Clay (1–0) Grass (0–0) Carpet (0–0) |

| Result | No. | Date | Tournament | Surface | Opponent | Score |
|---|---|---|---|---|---|---|
| Win | 1. | 3 August 2014 | Copenhagen, Denmark | Clay | (Denmark) Karen Barbat | 6–4, 7–5 |

=== Doubles: 1 (runner-up) ===
| Legend $100,000 tournaments $75,000 tournaments $50,000 tournaments $25,000 tournaments $10,000 tournaments | Finals by surface Hard (0–0) Clay (0–1) Grass (0–0) Carpet (0–0) |

| Result | No. | Date | Tournament | Surface | Partner | Opponents | Score |
|---|---|---|---|---|---|---|---|
| Loss | 1. | 4 October 2010 | Cagliari, Italy | Clay | (Netherlands) Eva Wacanno | (Italy) Elisa Salis (Italy) Valentina Sulpizio | w/o |

== Fed Cup participation ==
=== Singles ===
| Edition | Round | Date | Location | Against | Surface | Opponent | W/L | Score |
|---|---|---|---|---|---|---|---|---|
| 2009 Fed Cup; Europe/Africa Zone Group I | R/R | 6 February 2009 | Tallinn, Estonia | Slovenia | Hard (i) | Maša Zec Peškirič | L | 4–6, 5–7 |
| 2009 Fed Cup; Europe/Africa Zone Group I | P/O | 7 February 2009 | Tallinn, Estonia | Croatia | Hard (i) | Petra Martić | L | 5–7, 0–6 |
| 2010 Fed Cup; Europe/Africa Zone Group I | R/R | 3 February 2010 | Lisbon, Portugal | Sweden | Hard (i) | Johanna Larsson | L | 3–6, 1–6 |
| 2010 Fed Cup; Europe/Africa Zone Group I | R/R | 4 February 2010 | Lisbon, Portugal | Hungary | Hard (i) | Anikó Kapros | L | 0–6, 0–6 |
| 2010 Fed Cup; Europe/Africa Zone Group I | R/R | 5 February 2010 | Lisbon, Portugal | Latvia | Hard (i) | Diāna Marcinkēviča | W | 4–6, 6–4, 6–2 |
| 2010 Fed Cup; Europe/Africa Zone Group I | P/O | 6 February 2010 | Lisbon, Portugal | Israel | Hard (i) | Keren Shlomo | W | 6–4, 6–4 |
| 2012 Fed Cup; Europe/Africa Zone Group II | R/R | 18 April 2012 | Cairo, Egypt | South Africa | Clay | Ilze Hattingh | L | 6–7^{(5–7)}, 7–5, 0–6 |
| 2012 Fed Cup; Europe/Africa Zone Group II | R/R | 19 April 2012 | Cairo, Egypt | Montenegro | Clay | Vladica Babić | W | 6–3, 6–2 |
| 2012 Fed Cup; Europe/Africa Zone Group II | R/R | 20 April 2012 | Cairo, Egypt | Finland | Clay | Ella Leivo | W | 6–2, 6–3 |
| 2013 Fed Cup; Europe/Africa Zone Group III | R/R | 8 May 2013 | Chișinău, Moldova | Namibia | Clay | Rieke Honiball | W | 6–0, 6–0 |
| 2013 Fed Cup; Europe/Africa Zone Group III | R/R | 9 May 2013 | Chișinău, Moldova | Morocco | Clay | Fatima El Allami | W | 6–3, 6–1 |
| 2013 Fed Cup; Europe/Africa Zone Group III | P/O | 10 May 2013 | Chișinău, Moldova | Liechtenstein | Clay | Stephanie Vogt | W | 6–3, 6–1 |
| 2014 Fed Cup; Europe/Africa Zone Group III | R/R | 5 February 2014 | Tallinn, Estonia | Madagascar | Hard (i) | Nantenaina Ramalalaharivololona | W | 6–2, 6–3 |
| 2014 Fed Cup; Europe/Africa Zone Group III | R/R | 7 February 2014 | Tallinn, Estonia | Norway | Hard (i) | Ida Seljevoll Skancke | W | 6–1, 6–3 |
| 2014 Fed Cup; Europe/Africa Zone Group III | P/O | 8 February 2014 | Tallinn, Estonia | Estonia | Hard (i) | Anett Kontaveit | L | 0–6, 0–6 |
| 2015 Fed Cup; Europe/Africa Zone Group III | R/R | 16 April 2015 | Ulcinj, Montenegro | Norway | Clay | Emma Flood | L | 1–6, 3–6 |

=== Doubles ===
| Edition | Round | Date | Location | Against | Surface | Partner | Opponents | W/L | Score |
|---|---|---|---|---|---|---|---|---|---|
| 2010 Fed Cup; Europe/Africa Zone Group I | P/O | 6 February 2010 | Lisbon | Israel | Hard (i) | (Denmark) Karina Jacobsgaard | Julia Glushko; Shahar Pe'er | L | 0–6, 1–6 |
| 2011 Fed Cup; Europe/Africa Zone Group I | R/R | 3 February 2011 | Eilat, Israel | Switzerland | Hard | (Denmark) Caroline Wozniacki | Timea Bacsinszky; Patty Schnyder | L | 3–6, 2–6 |
| 2011 Fed Cup; Europe/Africa Zone Group I | R/R | 4 February 2011 | Eilat, Israel | (United Kingdom) Great Britain | Hard | (Denmark) Caroline Wozniacki | Jocelyn Rae; Heather Watson | L | 7–5, 5–7, 5–7 |
| 2011 Fed Cup; Europe/Africa Zone Group I | P/O | 5 February 2011 | Eilat, Israel | Greece | Hard | (Denmark) Caroline Wozniacki | Eleni Daniilidou; Eirini Georgatou | L | 2–6, 5–7 |
| 2012 Fed Cup; Europe/Africa Zone Group II | R/R | 18 April 2012 | Cairo | South Africa | Clay | (Denmark) Malou Ejdesgaard | Natalie Grandin; Madrie Le Roux | L | 5–7, 3–6 |
| 2012 Fed Cup; Europe/Africa Zone Group II | R/R | 19 April 2012 | Cairo | Montenegro | Clay | (Denmark) Malou Ejdesgaard | Danka Kovinić; Danica Krstajic | L | 4–6, 4–6 |
| 2013 Fed Cup; Europe/Africa Zone Group III | R/R | 8 May 2013 | Chișinău | Namibia | Clay | (Denmark) Malou Ejdesgaard | Rieke Honiball; Liniques Theron | W | 6–0, 6–0 |
| 2013 Fed Cup; Europe/Africa Zone Group III | P/O | 9 May 2013 | Chișinău | Liechtenstein | Clay | (Denmark) Malou Ejdesgaard | Stephanie Vogt; Kathinka von Deichmann | L | 3–6, 2–6 |
| 2014 Fed Cup; Europe/Africa Zone Group III | R/R | 5 February 2014 | Tallinn | Madagascar | Hard (i) | (Denmark) Karen Barbat | Nantenaina Ramalalaharivololona; Océane Razakaboana | W | 6–1, 6–1 |
| 2014 Fed Cup; Europe/Africa Zone Group III | R/R | 7 February 2014 | Tallinn | Norway | Hard (i) | (Denmark) Malou Ejdesgaard | Ida Seljevoll Skancke; Melanie Stokke | L | 6–7^{(7–9)}, 6–7^{(3–7)} |
| 2015 Fed Cup; Europe/Africa Zone Group III | R/R | 15 April 2015 | Ulcinj | Algeria | Clay | (Denmark) Emilie Francati | Amira Benaïssa; Inès Ibbou | W | 6–0, 6–0 |
| 2015 Fed Cup; Europe/Africa Zone Group III | R/R | 16 April 2015 | Ulcinj | Norway | Clay | (Denmark) Karen Barbat | Emma Flood; Caroline Rohde-Moe | W | 6–4, 6–2 |
| 2017 Fed Cup; Europe/Africa Zone Group II | R/R | 20 April 2017 | Šiauliai, Lithuania | Egypt | Hard (i) | (Denmark) Clara Tauson | Ola Abou Zekry; Rana Sherif Ahmed | L | 6–7^{(5–7)}, 4–6 |
| 2017 Fed Cup; Europe/Africa Zone Group II | R/R | 21 April 2017 | Šiauliai, Lithuania | Lithuania | Hard (i) | (Denmark) Emilie Francati | Joana Eidukonytė; Gerda Zykutė | W | 6–1, 6–2 |
