= Vladica Babić =

Montenegrin tennis player

- Country (sports): Montenegro
- Born: 27 October 1995 (age 30) Podgorica, Federal Republic of Yugoslavia
- Plays: Right-handed
- College: Oklahoma State University
- Prize money: $32,167

Singles
- Career record: 61–50
- Career titles: 2 ITF
- Highest ranking: No. 485 (9 December 2019)

Doubles
- Career record: 70–31
- Career titles: 9 ITF
- Highest ranking: No. 164 (4 November 2019)

Team competitions
- Fed Cup: 5–9

Vladica Babić (born 27 October 1995) is a Montenegrin former professional tennis player.

Playing for the Montenegro Fed Cup team, she has a win–loss record of 5–9.

Babić was studying at Oklahoma State University, between 2015 and 2018.

== ITF Circuit finals ==
=== Singles: 2 (2 titles) ===
Legend
$15,000 tournaments

Result	W–L	Date	Tournament	Tier	Surface	Opponent	Score
Win	1–0	Aug 2018	ITF Santa Tecla, El Salvador	15,000	Hard	(United States) Pamela Montez	7–6^{(6)}, 6–4
Win	2–0	Jan 2019	ITF Fort-de-France, Martinique	15,000	Hard	(France) Alice Tubello	6–4, 6–2

=== Doubles: 16 (9 titles, 7 runner-ups) ===
Legend
$60,000 tournaments
$25,000 tournaments
$10/15,000 tournaments

Result	W–L	Date	Tournament	Tier	Surface	Partner	Opponents	Score
Loss	0–1	Jul 2013	Palić Open, Serbia	10k	Clay	(Serbia) Katarina Adamović	(Slovakia) Vivien Juhászová (Czech Republic) Tereza Malíková	6–3, 4–6, [5–10]
Win	1–1	Aug 2013	ITF Pirot, Serbia	10k	Clay	(Serbia) Katarina Adamović	(Bulgaria) Borislava Botusharova (Bulgaria) Ani Vangelova	6–0, 6–3
Win	2–1	Sep 2013	Royal Cup, Montenegro	25k	Clay	(Croatia) Iva Mekovec	(Czech Republic) Kateřina Vaňková (Slovenia) Maša Zec Peškirič	4–6, 7–6^{(1)}, [10–5]
Loss	2–2	Aug 2018	ITF Santa Tecla, El Salvador	10k	Hard	(United States) Monica Robinson	(United States) Stephanie Nemtsova (Mexico) Andrea Renée Villarreal	1–6, 6–7^{(4)}
Loss	2–3	Sep 2018	ITF Lubbock, United States	25k	Hard	(United States) Hayley Carter	(United Kingdom) Naomi Broady (Argentina) Nadia Podoroska	6–3, 2–6, [8–10]
Win	3–3	Nov 2018	ITF Lawrence, US	25k	Hard	(United States) Ena Shibahara	(Kazakhstan) Anna Danilina (Russia) Ksenia Laskutova	6–4, 6–2
Win	4–3	Nov 2018	ITF Norman, US	25k	Hard	(United States) Ena Shibahara	(Mexico) María Portillo Ramírez (United States) Sofia Sewing	6–2, 6–3
Loss	4–4	Jan 2019	ITF Petit-Bourg, Guadeloupe	W25	Hard	(Netherlands) Rosalie van der Hoek	(United States) Quinn Gleason (Brazil) Luisa Stefani	5–7, 3–6
Win	5–4	Mar 2019	ITF Cancún, Mexico	W15	Hard	(New Zealand) Paige Hourigan	(Czech Republic) Karolína Beránková (Paraguay) Lara Escauriza	6–4, 6–3
Loss	5–5	Jun 2019	ITF Sumter, US	W25	Hard	(United States) Hayley Carter	(United States) Brynn Boren (United States) Caitlin Whoriskey	4–6, 4–6
Win	6–5	Jun 2019	ITF Denver, US	W25	Hard	(United States) Hayley Carter	(United States) Brynn Boren (United States) Gail Brodsky	6–2, 6–3
Win	7–5	Jun 2019	ITF Shreveport, US	W15	Clay	(Chinese Taipei) Hsu Chieh-yu	(United States) Jennifer Elie (Australia) Alexandra Osborne	6–2, 6–0
Loss	7–6	Jul 2019	Ashland Classic, US	W60	Hard	(Sweden) Julia Rosenqvist	(United States) Sanaz Marand (United States) Caitlin Whoriskey	6–7, 4–6
Win	8–6	Sep 2019	ITF Templeton Pro, US	W60	Hard	(United States) Caitlin Whoriskey	(Romania) Gabriela Talabă (Mexico) Marcela Zacarías	6–4, 6–2
Loss	8–7	Oct 2019	ITF Charleston Pro, US	W60	Clay	(United States) Caitlin Whoriskey	(Kazakhstan) Anna Danilina (United States) Ingrid Neel	1–6, 1–6
Win	9–7	Oct 2019	Waco Showdown, US	W25	Clay	(Kazakhstan) Anna Danilina	(United States) Savannah Broadus (United States) Vanessa Ong	6–3, 6–2

== National representation ==
=== Fed Cup ===
Babić made her Fed Cup debut for Montenegro in 2011, while the team was competing in the Europe/Africa Zone Group III, when she was 15 years and 193 days old.

Group membership World Group II World Group II Play-off Europe/Africa Group (5–9)	Matches by surface Hard (0–0) Clay (5–9) Grass (0–0) Carpet (0–0)	Matches by type Singles (4–5) Doubles (1–4)	Matches by setting Indoors (0–0) Outdoors (5–9)

==== Singles (4–5) ====
Edition	Stage	Date	Location	Against	Surface	Opponent	W/L	Score
2012 Fed Cup; Europe/Africa Zone Group II	Pool A	18 April 2012	Cairo, Egypt	Finland	Clay	Ella Leivo	W	6–2, 6–7^{(5)}, 6–1
2012 Fed Cup; Europe/Africa Zone Group II	Pool A	19 April 2012	Cairo, Egypt	Denmark	Clay	Mai Grage	L	3–6, 2–6
2012 Fed Cup; Europe/Africa Zone Group II	Pool A	20 April 2012	Cairo, Egypt	South Africa	Clay	Ilze Hattingh	L	2–6, 4–6
2012 Fed Cup; Europe/Africa Zone Group II	Promotional Play-off	21 April 2012	Cairo, Egypt	(Georgia (country)) Georgia	Clay	Sofia Shapatava	L	2–6, 3–6
2013 Fed Cup; Europe/Africa Zone Group II	Pool B	18 April 2013	Ulcinj, Montenegro	South Africa	Clay	Natalie Grandin	L	1–6, 6–3, 0–6
2013 Fed Cup; Europe/Africa Zone Group II	Pool B	19 April 2013	Ulcinj, Montenegro	Lithuania	Clay	Joana Eidukonytė	W	6–0, 6–4
2019 Fed Cup; Europe/Africa Zone Group III	Pool A	17 April 2019	Ulcinj, Montenegro	Armenia	Clay	Gabriella Akopyan	W	6–0, 6–0
2019 Fed Cup; Europe/Africa Zone Group III	Pool A	19 April 2019	Ulcinj, Montenegro	Norway	Clay	Melanie Stokke	L	2–6, 6–3, 5–7
2019 Fed Cup; Europe/Africa Zone Group III	3rd-4th Play-off	20 April 2019	Ulcinj, Montenegro	(Republic of Ireland) Ireland	Clay	Juliana Carton	W	6–4, 6–0

==== Doubles (1–4) ====
Edition	Stage	Date	Location	Against	Surface	Partner	Opponents	W/L	Score
2011 Fed Cup; Europe/Africa Zone Group III	Pool A	6 May 2011	Cairo, Egypt	South Africa	Clay	Tamara Stanić	Natalie Grandin; Chanel Simmonds	L	1–6, 0–6
2012 Fed Cup; Europe/Africa Zone Group II	Pool A	20 April 2012	Cairo, Egypt	South Africa	Clay	Milica Šljukić	Lynn Kiro; Madrie Le Roux	L	1–6, 2–6
2012 Fed Cup; Europe/Africa Zone Group II	Promotional Play-off	21 April 2012	Cairo, Egypt	(Georgia (country)) Georgia	Clay	Milica Šljukić	Sofia Kvatsabaia; Sofia Shapatava	L	3–6, 4–6
2019 Fed Cup; Europe/Africa Zone Group III	Pool A	17 April 2019	Ulcinj, Montenegro	Armenia	Clay	Divna Ratković	Yeva Avetisyan; Evelina Martirosyan	W	6–2, 6–2
2019 Fed Cup; Europe/Africa Zone Group III	3rd-4th Play-off	20 April 2019	Ulcinj, Montenegro	(Republic of Ireland) Ireland	Clay	Divna Ratković	Rachael Dillon; Sinéad Lohan	L	4–6, 6–3, 3–6

=== Games of the Small States of Europe ===
==== Singles: 1 (win) ====
Result	W–L	Date	Tournament	Surface	Opponent	Score
Win	1–0	1 June 2019	Budva, Montenegro	Clay	(Luxembourg) Eléonora Molinaro	4–6, 7–6, 6–4

==== Mixed doubles: 1 (runner-up) ====
Result	W–L	Date	Tournament	Surface	Partner	Opponents	Score
Loss	0–1	1 June 2019	Budva, Montenegro	Clay	(Montenegro) Rrezart Cungu	(Cyprus) Raluca Șerban (Cyprus) Eleftherios Neos	4–6, 6–3, [7–10]
