= Madrie Le Roux =

South African tennis player (born 1995)

- Country (sports): South Africa
- Residence: Potchefstroom, North West, South Africa
- Born: 19 April 1995 (age 29); Uitenhage, Eastern Cape
- Plays: Right (two-handed backhand)
- Prize money: $20,102

Singles
- Career record: 68–47
- Career titles: 0
- Highest ranking: No. 543 (23 June 2014)

Doubles
- Career record: 74–31
- Career titles: 7 ITF
- Highest ranking: No. 512 (16 May 2016)

Team competitions
- Fed Cup: 16–10

Madrie Le Roux (born 19 April 1995) is a South African former tennis player.

Born in Uitenhage, Le Roux was introduced to tennis at the age of six. On the ITF Junior Circuit, she has been ranked as high as world No. 69, achieved in January 2013.

On the ITF Women's Circuit, Le Roux has won seven doubles titles.

From November 2017 until November 2018, she did not play a single professional match.

== ITF finals ==
=== Singles (0–3) ===
Legend $25,000 tournaments $10,000 tournaments	Finals by surface Hard (0–3) Clay (0–0)

Outcome	No.	Date	Tournament	Surface	Opponent	Score
Runner-up	1.	30 June 2013	Sharm El Sheikh, Egypt	Hard	(Greece) Despoina Vogasari	4–6, 4–6
Runner-up	2.	9 March 2014	Sharm El Sheikh, Egypt	Hard	(Finland) Emma Laine	2–6, 2–6
Runner-up	3.	9 June 2014	Sun City, South Africa	Hard	(South Africa) Chanel Simmonds	2–6, 2–6

=== Doubles (7–8) ===
Legend $25,000 tournaments $10,000 tournaments	Finals by surface Hard (7–7) Clay (0–1)

Outcome	No.	Date	Tournament	Surface	Partner	Opponent	Score
Runner-up	1.	23 June 2013	Sharm El Sheikh, Egypt	Hard	(Egypt) Mai El Kamash	(Italy) Alessia Camplone (Italy) Valeria Prosper	4–6, 5–7
Winner	1.	30 June 2013	Sharm El Sheikh, Egypt	Hard	(Egypt) Mai El Kamash	(Russia) Julia Valetova (Russia) Polina Monova	6–2, 2–6, [10–1]
Runner-up	2.	1 December 2013	Sharm El Sheikh, Egypt	Hard	(South Africa) Ilze Hattingh	(Spain) Arabela Fernandez Rabener (Russia) Liudmila Vasilyeva	0–6, 2–6
Runner-up	3.	31 May 2014	Sun City, South Africa	Hard	(South Africa) Ilze Hattingh	(South Africa) Michelle Sammons (South Africa) Chanel Simmonds	5–7, 3–6
Runner-up	4.	7 June 2014	Sun City, South Africa	Hard	(South Africa) Ilze Hattingh	(Poland) Agata Barańska (United States) Stephanie Kent	w/o
Runner-up	5.	13 June 2014	Sun City, South Africa	Hard	(South Africa) Ilze Hattingh	(South Africa) Michelle Sammons (South Africa) Chanel Simmonds	3–6, 3–6
Winner	2.	26 July 2014	Sharm El Sheikh, Egypt	Hard	(South Africa) Ilze Hattingh	(Russia) Alina Mikheeva (Germany) Linda Prenkovic	6–1, 7–6
Runner-up	6.	12 June 2015	Antananarivo, Madagascar	Clay	(Namibia) Liniques Theron	(Madagascar) Sandra Andriamarosoa (Madagascar) Zarah Razafimahatratra	3–6, 2–6
Runner-up	7.	20 June 2015	Grand-Baie, Mauritius	Hard	(South Africa) Ilze Hattingh	(Czech Republic) Marie Bouzková (Netherlands) Rosalie van der Hoek	3–6, 5–7
Winner	3.	27 June 2015	Grand-Baie, Mauritius	Hard	(South Africa) Ilze Hattingh	(India) Snehadevi Reddy (India) Dhruthi Tatachar Venugopal	6–2, 6–4
Winner	4.	7 November 2015	Stellenbosch, South Africa	Hard	(Netherlands) Erika Vogelsang	(Zimbabwe) Valeria Bhunu (Namibia) Lesedi Sheya Jacobs	7–6^{(6)}, 6–2
Runner-up	8.	14 November 2015	Stellenbosch, South Africa	Hard	(South Africa) Ilze Hattingh	(United Kingdom) Francesca Stephenson (Netherlands) Erika Vogelsang	4–6, 4–6
Winner	5.	21 November 2015	Stellenbosch, South Africa	Hard	(South Africa) Ilze Hattingh	(Germany) Katharina Hering (Hungary) Naomi Totka	6–1, 7–6^{(5)}
Winner	6.	20 February 2016	Sharm El Sheikh, Egypt	Hard	(South Africa) Ilze Hattingh	(Romania) Oana Georgeta Simion (Bulgaria) Julia Terziyska	6–1, 6–2
Winner	7.	12 November 2016	Stellenbosch, South Africa	Hard	(South Africa) Ilze Hattingh	(Zimbabwe) Valeria Bhunu (Sweden) Linnea Malmqvist	6–1, 6–2

== Fed Cup participation ==
=== Singles ===
Edition	Stage	Date	Location	Against	Surface	Opponent	W/L	Score
2013 Fed Cup; Europe/Africa Zone Group II	P/O	20 April 2013	Ulcinj, Montenegro	Estonia	Clay	Eva Paalma	L	2–6, 1–6
2014 Fed Cup; Europe/Africa Zone Group II	R/R	16 April 2014	Šiauliai, Lithuania	Bosnia and Herzegovina	Hard (i)	Anita Husarić	W	6–2, 6–4
2014 Fed Cup; Europe/Africa Zone Group II	R/R	17 April 2014	Šiauliai, Lithuania	(Georgia (country)) Georgia	Hard (i)	Sofia Kvatsabaia	W	7–5, 6–3
2014 Fed Cup; Europe/Africa Zone Group II	R/R	18 April 2014	Šiauliai, Lithuania	Egypt	Hard (i)	Sandra Samir	W	6–3, 6–2
2016 Fed Cup; Europe/Africa Zone Group I	R/R	3 February 2016	Eilat, Israel	(Georgia (country)) Georgia	Hard	Ekaterine Gorgodze	L	3–6, 1–6

=== Doubles ===
Edition	Stage	Date	Location	Against	Surface	Partner	Opponents	W/L	Score
2011 Fed Cup; Europe/Africa Zone Group III	R/R	5 May 2011	Cairo, Egypt	Lithuania	Clay	(South Africa) Natalie Grandin	Aurelija Misevičiūtė; Lina Padegimaite	W	7–5, 4–6, 7–6^{(7–1)}
2011 Fed Cup; Europe/Africa Zone Group III	P/O	7 May 2011	Cairo, Egypt	Egypt	Clay	(South Africa) Natasha Fourouclas	Mai El Kamash; Mayar Sherif	W	7–5, 4–6, [10–6]
2012 Fed Cup; Europe/Africa Zone Group II	R/R	18 April 2012	Cairo, Egypt	Denmark	Clay	(South Africa) Natalie Grandin	Malou Ejdesgaard; Mai Grage	W	7–5, 6–3
2012 Fed Cup; Europe/Africa Zone Group II	R/R	19 April 2012	Cairo, Egypt	Finland	Clay	(South Africa) Natalie Grandin	Johanna Hyöty; Ella Leivo	W	6–0, 6–1
2012 Fed Cup; Europe/Africa Zone Group II	R/R	20 April 2012	Cairo, Egypt	Montenegro	Clay	(South Africa) Lynn Kiro	Vladica Babić; Milica Šljukić	W	6–1, 6–2
2012 Fed Cup; Europe/Africa Zone Group II	P/O	21 April 2012	Cairo, Egypt	Turkey	Clay	(South Africa) Lynn Kiro	Pemra Özgen; Melis Sezer	L	4–6, 2–6
2013 Fed Cup; Europe/Africa Zone Group II	R/R	17 April 2013	Ulcinj, Montenegro	Lithuania	Clay	(South Africa) Natalie Grandin	Agnė Čepelytė; Joana Eidukonytė	W	6–4, 6–2
2013 Fed Cup; Europe/Africa Zone Group II	R/R	18 April 2013	Ulcinj, Montenegro	Montenegro	Clay	(South Africa) Natalie Grandin	Danka Kovinic; Danica Krstajic	L	4–6, 7–6^{(7–2)}, 3–6
2013 Fed Cup; Europe/Africa Zone Group II	R/R	19 April 2013	Ulcinj, Montenegro	Greece	Clay	(South Africa) Natalie Grandin	Despina Papamichail; Despoina Vogasari	W	6–4, 6–4
2013 Fed Cup; Europe/Africa Zone Group II	P/O	20 April 2013	Ulcinj, Montenegro	Estonia	Clay	(South Africa) Natalie Grandin	Tatjana Vorobjova; Eva Paalma	W	6–1, 6–3
2016 Fed Cup; Europe/Africa Zone Group I	R/R	4 February 2016	Eilat, Israel	(United Kingdom) Great Britain	Hard	(South Africa) Michelle Sammons	Jocelyn Rae; Anna Smith	L	3–6, 2–6
2017 Fed Cup; Europe/Africa Zone Group II	R/R	19 April 2017	Šiauliai, Lithuania	Norway	Hard (i)	(South Africa) Chanel Simmonds	Astrid Wanja Brune Olsen; Caroline Rohde-Moe	L	6–7^{(1–7)}, 4–6
2017 Fed Cup; Europe/Africa Zone Group II	R/R	20 April 2017	Šiauliai, Lithuania	Slovenia	Hard (i)	(South Africa) Ilze Hattingh	Dalila Jakupović; Andreja Klepač	L	2–6, 6–4, 0–6
2017 Fed Cup; Europe/Africa Zone Group II	R/R	21 April 2017	Šiauliai, Lithuania	Sweden	Hard (i)	(South Africa) Chanel Simmonds	Johanna Larsson; Cornelia Lister	L	3–6, 3–6
