= 2017 Fed Cup Europe/Africa Zone Group II – play-offs =

Subsection of tennis competition

The play-offs of the 2017 Fed Cup Europe/Africa Zone Group II were the final stages of the Group II zonal competition involving teams from Europe and Africa. Using the positions determined in their pools, the eight teams faced off to determine their placing in the 2017 Fed Cup Europe/Africa Zone Group II. The top two teams advanced to Group I, and the bottom two teams were relegated down to the Group III for the next year.

Placing	Pool A	Pool B
1	Slovenia	Denmark
2	Sweden	Luxembourg
3	Norway	Egypt
4	South Africa	Lithuania

== Promotional play-offs ==
The first-placed teams of each pool played against the second-placed teams of the other pool in head-to-head rounds. The winner of each round advanced to the 2018 Europe/Africa Zone Group I.

=== Slovenia vs. Luxembourg ===
Slovenia
2
Šiauliai Tennis School, Šiauliai, Lithuania
22 April 2017
Hard (indoors)

Luxembourg
0

			1	2	3
1	(Slovenia) (Luxembourg)	Dalila Jakupović; Claudine Schaul	6; 1	7^{7} 6^{5}
2	(Slovenia) (Luxembourg)	Tamara Zidanšek; Eléonora Molinaro	4; 6	7; 5	6; 2
3	(Slovenia) (Luxembourg)	Andreja Klepač / Tamara Zidanšek; Tiffany Cornelius / Eléonora Molinaro				not played

=== Denmark vs. Sweden ===
Denmark
1
Šiauliai Tennis School, Šiauliai, Lithuania
22 April 2017
Hard (indoors)

Sweden
2

			1	2	3
1	(Denmark) (Sweden)	Emilie Francati; Cornelia Lister	6; 3	6; 4
2	(Denmark) (Sweden)	Karen Barritza; Johanna Larsson	2; 6	4; 6
3	(Denmark) (Sweden)	Karen Barritza / Emilie Francati; Johanna Larsson / Cornelia Lister	2; 6	4; 6

== Relegation play-offs ==
The third-placed teams of the pools played against the fourth-placed teams in a head-to-head round. The loser of each round was relegated to the 2018 Europe/Africa Zone Group III.

=== Norway vs. Lithuania ===
Norway
2
Šiauliai Tennis School, Šiauliai, Lithuania
22 April 2017
Hard (indoors)

Lithuania
0

			1	2	3
1	(Norway) (Lithuania)	Malene Helgø; Paulina Bakaitė	6; 3	7^{7} 6^{4}
2	(Norway) (Lithuania)	Ulrikke Eikeri; Joana Eidukonytė	6; 3	6; 4
3	(Norway) (Lithuania)	Astrid Wanja Brune Olsen / Ulrikke Eikeri; Joana Eidukonytė / Gerda Zykutė				not played

=== Egypt vs. South Africa ===
Egypt
2
Šiauliai Tennis School, Šiauliai, Lithuania
22 April 2017
Hard (indoors)

South Africa
0

			1	2	3
1	(Egypt) (South Africa)	Mai El Kamash; Ilze Hattingh	7; 5	1; 6	6; 2
2	(Egypt) (South Africa)	Sandra Samir; Chanel Simmonds	6; 3	7^{7} 6^{5}
3	(Egypt) (South Africa)	Sandra Samir / Rana Sherif Ahmed; Madrie Le Roux / Chanel Simmonds				not played

== Final placements ==
Placing	Teams	
Promoted/First	Slovenia	Sweden
Third	Luxembourg	Denmark
Fifth	Norway	Egypt
Relegated/Seventh	Lithuania	South Africa

- Slovenia and Sweden were promoted to Europe/Africa Zone Group I in 2018
- Lithuania and South Africa were relegated to Europe/Africa Zone Group III in 2018
