= Johanna Hyöty =

Finnish tennis player

- Country (sports): Finland
- Born: 15 February 1992 (age 33); Tampere, Finland
- Height: 1.65 m (5 ft 5 in)
- Prize money: $4,604

Singles
- Career record: 12–23
- Career titles: 0
- Highest ranking: 893 (29 October 2012)

Doubles
- Career record: 7–19
- Career titles: 0
- Highest ranking: 763 (22 October 2012)

Team competitions
- Fed Cup: 1–3

Johanna Hyöty (born 15 February 1992) is a Finnish tennis player.

On 29 October 2012, Hyöty reached her best singles ranking of world number 893. On 22 October 2012, she peaked at number 763 in the WTA doubles rankings.

Hyöty was born in Tampere, and has a 1–3 record for Finland in Fed Cup competition.

On 7 November 2016, she joined accounting firm Squar Milner LLP, which was bought by Baker Tilly US, LLP in 2020. She is a licensed CPA in the state of California.

== Collegiate career ==
In 2016, as a senior at Boston University, Hyöty was named the Patriot League Player of the Year.

== ITF finals ==
=== Doubles (0–1) ===
Legend $100,000 tournaments $75,000 tournaments $50,000 tournaments $25,000 tournaments $10,000 tournaments	Finals by surface Hard (0–0) Clay (0–1) Grass (0–0) Carpet (0–0)

Outcome	No.	Date	Tournament	Surface	Partner	Opponents	Score
Runner-up	1.	12 April 2012	Tlemcen, Algeria	Clay	(Finland) Ella Leivo	(Russia) Alexandra Romanova (Germany) Alina Wessel	5–7, 7–5, [10–12]

== Fed Cup participation ==
=== Singles ===
Edition	Stage	Date	Location	Against	Surface	Opponent	W/L	Score
2012 Fed Cup; Europe/Africa Zone Group II	R/R	19 April 2012	Cairo, Egypt	South Africa	Clay	(South Africa) Ilze Hattingh	L	2–6, 1–6

=== Doubles ===
Edition	Stage	Date	Location	Against	Surface	Partner	Opponents	W/L	Score
2012 Fed Cup; Europe/Africa Zone Group II	R/R	18 April 2012	Cairo, Egypt	Montenegro	Clay	(Finland) Emma Laine	(Montenegro) Danka Kovinić (Montenegro) Danica Krstajić	L	6–7^{(4–7)}, 3–6
2012 Fed Cup; Europe/Africa Zone Group II	R/R	19 April 2012	Cairo, Egypt	South Africa	Clay	(Finland) Ella Leivo	(South Africa) Natalie Grandin (South Africa) Madrie Le Roux	L	0–6, 1–6
2012 Fed Cup; Europe/Africa Zone Group II	P/O	21 April 2012	Cairo, Egypt	Norway	Clay	(Finland) Ella Leivo	(Norway) Emma Flood (Norway) Hedda Ødegaard	W	4–6, 7–5, 6–3
