= 2012 Fed Cup Europe/Africa Zone Group II – play-offs =

The play-offs of the 2012 Fed Cup Europe/Africa Zone Group II were the final stages of the Group II Zonal Competition involving teams from Europe and Africa. Using the positions determined in their pools, the seven teams faced off to determine their placing in the 2012 Fed Cup Europe/Africa Zone Group II. The top two teams advanced to Group I, and the bottom two teams were relegated down to the Group III for the next year.

Placing	Pool A	Pool B
1	South Africa	Georgia
2	Montenegro	Turkey
3	Finland	Latvia
4	Denmark	Norway

== Promotion play-offs ==
The first-placed teams of each pool played against the second-placed teams of the other pool in head-to-head rounds. The winner of each round advanced to the 2013 Europe/Africa Zone Group I.

=== South Africa vs. Turkey ===
South Africa
0
Golf El Solaimaneyah Club, Cairo, Egypt
21 April 2012
Red clay (outdoors)

Turkey
3

			1	2	3
1	(South Africa) (Turkey)	Ilze Hattingh; Pemra Özgen	4; 6	2; 6
2	(South Africa) (Turkey)	Natalie Grandin; Çağla Büyükakçay	6; 2	2; 6	4; 6
3	(South Africa) (Turkey)	Lynn Kiro / Madrie Le Roux; Pemra Özgen / Melis Sezer	4; 6	2; 6

=== Georgia vs. Montenegro ===
Georgia
3
Golf El Solaimaneyah Club, Cairo, Egypt
21 April 2012
Red clay (outdoors)

Montenegro
0

			1	2	3
1	(Georgia (country)) (Montenegro)	Sofia Shapatava; Vladica Babić	6; 2	6; 3
2	(Georgia (country)) (Montenegro)	Anna Tatishvili; Danka Kovinić	6; 2	6; 2
3	(Georgia (country)) (Montenegro)	Sofia Kvatsabaia / Sofia Shapatava; Vladica Babić / Milica Šljukić	6; 3	6; 4

== Relegation play-offs ==
The third-placed teams of each pool played against the fourth-placed teams of the other pool in head-to-head rounds. The loser of each round was relegated to the 2013 Europe/Africa Zone Group III.

=== Finland vs. Norway ===
Finland
3
Golf El Solaimaneyah Club, Cairo, Egypt
21 April 2012
Red clay (outdoors)

Norway
0

			1	2	3
1	(Finland) (Norway)	Emma Laine; Hedda Odegaard	7^{7} 6^{2}	6; 2
2	(Finland) (Norway)	Piia Suomalainen; Ulrikke Eikeri	3; 6	6; 4	6; 3
3	(Finland) (Norway)	Johanna Hyöty / Ella Leivo; Emma Flood / Hedda Odegaard	4; 6	7; 5	6; 3

=== Latvia vs. Denmark ===
Latvia
3
Golf El Solaimaneyah Club, Cairo, Egypt
21 April 2012
Red clay (outdoors)

Denmark
0

			1	2	3
1	(Latvia) (Denmark)	Līga Dekmeijere; Cecilie Lundgaard Melsted	6; 3	6; 2
2	(Latvia) (Denmark)	Diāna Marcinkēviča; Karen Barbat	3; 6	6; 3	6; 3
3	(Latvia) (Denmark)	Līga Dekmeijere / Diāna Marcinkēviča; Malou Ejdesgaard / Cecilie Lundgaard Melsted	6; 1	6; 1

== Final Placements ==
Placing	Teams	
Promoted	Turkey	Georgia
Third	South Africa	Montenegro
Fifth	Finland	Latvia
Relegated	Norway	Denmark

- Turkey and Georgia were promoted to Europe/Africa Zone Group I for 2013.
- Norway and Denmark were relegated down to Europe/Africa Zone Group III for 2013.

== See also ==
- Fed Cup structure
