= Hedda Ødegaard =

Norwegian tennis player

- Country (sports): Norway
- Residence: Oslo, Norway
- Born: 7 January 1995 (age 31) Lillestrøm, Norway
- Plays: Left-handed
- Prize money: $221

Singles
- Career record: 0–1
- Career titles: 0

Doubles
- Career record: 0–0
- Career titles: 0

Team competitions
- Fed Cup: 3–10
- Last updated on: 10 June 2019.

Hedda Ødegaard (born 7 January 1995) is a Norwegian tennis player. She won the Norway National Tennis Championships in 2011 both singles and doubles.

== ITF junior finals ==
Legend
Grand Slam
Category GA
Category G1
Category G2
Category G3
Category G4
Category G5

=== Singles (1–2) ===
| Result | No. | Date | Tournament | Grade | Surface | Opponent | Score |
|---|---|---|---|---|---|---|---|
| Runner-up | 1. | 4 February 2011 | Doha, Qatar | G5 | Hard | (France) Laura Tanfin | 6–2, 2–6, 4–6 |
| Win | 1. | 26 March 2011 | Oslo, Norway | G4 | Hard (i) | (United Kingdom) Alicia Barnett | 6–0, 6–2 |
| Runner-up | 2. | 19 June 2011 | Lviv, Ukraine | G3 | Clay | (Hungary) Ágnes Bukta | 3–6, 4–6 |

=== Doubles (3–0) ===
| Result | No. | Date | Tournament | Grade | Surface | Partner | Opponents | Score |
|---|---|---|---|---|---|---|---|---|
| Win | 1. | 27 February 2011 | Oslo, Norway | G4 | Hard (i) | (Norway) Ulrikke Eikeri | (Hungary) Krisztina Kapitány (Hungary) Szabina Szlavikovics | 6–3, 4–6, [10–3] |
| Win | 2. | 11 July 2010 | Nastola, Finland | G5 | Clay | (Sweden) Rebecca Poikajärvi | (Russia) Aida Golman (Russia) Liubov Vasilyeva | 7–5, 7–6^{(7–3)} |
| Win | 3. | 26 March 2011 | Oslo, Norway | G4 | Hard (i) | (Denmark) Cecilie Melsted | (Sweden) Cornelia Lister (Czech Republic) Barbora Štefková | w/o |

== National representation ==
=== Fed Cup ===
Ødegaard made her Fed Cup debut for Norway in 2010, while the team was competing in the Europe/Africa Zone Group II, when she was 15 years and 113 days old.

==== Fed Cup (3–10) ====
| Group membership World Group (0–0) World Group Play-off (0–0) World Group II (0–0) World Group II Play-off (0–0) Europe/Africa Group (3–10) | Matches by surface Hard (3–10) Clay (0–0) Grass (0–0) Carpet (0–0) | Matches by type Singles (2–5) Doubles (1–5) | Matches by setting Indoors (0–0) Outdoors (3–10) |

==== Singles (2–5) ====
| Edition | Stage | Date | Location | Against | Surface | Opponent | W/L | Score |
|---|---|---|---|---|---|---|---|---|
| 2012 Fed Cup; Europe/Africa Zone Group II | Pool B | 18 April 2012 | Cairo, Egypt | (Georgia (country)) Georgia | Clay | Sofia Kvatsabaia | L | 4–6, 3–6 |
| 2012 Fed Cup; Europe/Africa Zone Group II | Pool B | 19 April 2012 | Cairo, Egypt | Turkey | Clay | Pemra Özgen | L | 0–6, 6–7^{(2–7)} |
| 2012 Fed Cup; Europe/Africa Zone Group II | Relegation Play-off | 21 April 2012 | Cairo, Egypt | Finland | Clay | Emma Laine | L | 6–7^{(2–7)}, 2–6 |
| 2013 Fed Cup; Europe/Africa Zone Group III | Pool D | 8 May 2013 | Chișinău, Moldova | Cyprus | Clay | Mara Argyriou | W | 3–6, 6–3, 7–5 |
| 2013 Fed Cup; Europe/Africa Zone Group III | Pool D | 9 May 2013 | Chișinău, Moldova | Liechtenstein | Clay | Stephanie Vogt | L | 1–6, 6–7^{(3–7)} |
| 2013 Fed Cup; Europe/Africa Zone Group III | Pool D | 10 May 2013 | Chișinău, Moldova | Madagascar | Clay | Zarah Razafimahatratra | L | 3–6, 1–6 |
| 2013 Fed Cup; Europe/Africa Zone Group III | 9th-12th Play-off | 11 May 2013 | Chișinău, Moldova | Namibia | Clay | Rieke Honiball | W | 6–3, 6–3 |

==== Doubles (1–5) ====
| Edition | Stage | Date | Location | Against | Surface | Partner | Opponents | W/L | Score |
|---|---|---|---|---|---|---|---|---|---|
| 2010 Fed Cup; Europe/Africa Zone Group II | Pool B | 30 April 2010 | Yerevan, Armenia | (Georgia (country)) Georgia | Clay | Caroline Rohde-Moe | Oksana Kalashnikova; Sofia Shapatava | L | 2–6, 1–6 |
| 2012 Fed Cup; Europe/Africa Zone Group II | Pool B | 19 April 2012 | Cairo, Egypt | Turkey | Clay | Emma Flood | Melis Sezer; İpek Soylu | L | 6–3, 2–6, 4–6 |
| 2012 Fed Cup; Europe/Africa Zone Group II | Pool B | 20 April 2012 | Cairo, Egypt | Latvia | Clay | Emma Flood | Laura Gulbe; Diāna Marcinkeviča | L | 3–6, 4–6 |
| 2012 Fed Cup; Europe/Africa Zone Group II | Relegation Play-off | 21 April 2012 | Cairo, Egypt | Finland | Clay | Emma Flood | Johanna Hyöty; Ella Leivo | L | 6–4, 5–7, 3–6 |
| 2013 Fed Cup; Europe/Africa Zone Group III | Pool D | 8 May 2013 | Chișinău, Moldova | Cyprus | Clay | Melanie Stokke | Maria Siopacha; Andria Tsaggaridou | W | 7–5, 6–4 |
| 2013 Fed Cup; Europe/Africa Zone Group III | Pool D | 10 May 2013 | Chișinău, Moldova | Madagascar | Clay | Melanie Stokke | Hariniony Andriamananarivo; Zarah Razafimahatratra | L | 5–7, 1–6 |

Sporting positions
| Preceded by (Norway) Caroline Rohde-Moe | Norwegian National Women's Singles Tennis Champion; 2011 | Succeeded by (Norway) Caroline Rohde-Moe |
