= 2013 Fed Cup Europe/Africa Zone Group III – play-offs =

International tennis competition

The play-offs of the 2013 Fed Cup Europe/Africa Zone Group III were the final stages of the Group III Zonal Competition involving teams from Europe and Africa. Using the positions determined in their pools, the twelve teams faced off to determine their placing in the 2013 Fed Cup Europe/Africa Zone Group III. The top two teams advanced to Fed Cup Europe/Africa Zone Group II.

Placing	Pool A	Pool B	Pool C	Pool D
1	Egypt	Denmark	Moldova	Liechtenstein
2	Malta	Morocco	Ireland	Madagascar
3	Armenia	Kenya	Namibia	Norway
4	–	–	–	Cyprus

== Promotion play-offs ==
The first placed teams of each pool were drawn in head-to-head rounds. The winner of each round advanced to Group II in 2013.

=== Egypt vs. Moldova ===
Egypt
2
Terraten Club, Chișinău, Moldova
11 May 2013
Red clay (outdoors)

Moldova
0

			1	2	3
1	(Egypt) (Moldova)	Sandra Samir; Gabriela Porubin	6; 4	7^{7} 6^{1}
2	(Egypt) (Moldova)	Magy Aziz; Anastasia Vdovenco	5; 7	7; 5	6; 2
3	(Egypt) (Moldova)	Magy Aziz / Mora Eshak; Gabriela Porubin / Anastasia Vdovenco				not played

=== Denmark vs. Liechtenstein ===
Denmark
1
Terraten Club, Chișinău, Moldova
11 May 2013
Red clay (outdoors)

Liechtenstein
2

			1	2	3
1	(Denmark) (Liechtenstein)	Maria Jespersen; Kathinka von Deichmann	4; 6	2; 6
2	(Denmark) (Liechtenstein)	Mai Grage; Stephanie Vogt	6; 3	6; 1
3	(Denmark) (Liechtenstein)	Malou Ejdesgaard / Mai Grage; Stephanie Vogt / Kathinka von Deichmann	3; 6	2; 6

== 5th to 8th play-offs ==
The second placed teams of each pool were drawn in head-to-head rounds to find the equal fifth and seventh placed teams.

=== Malta vs. Ireland ===
Malta
2
Terraten Club, Chișinău, Moldova
11 May 2013
Red clay (outdoors)

Ireland
1

			1	2	3
1	(Malta) (Republic of Ireland)	Rosanne Dimech; Jane Fennelly	5; 7	0; 6
2	(Malta) (Republic of Ireland)	Elaine Genovese; Sinéad Lohan	7; 5	6; 4
3	(Malta) (Republic of Ireland)	Rosanne Dimech / Elaine Genovese; Jenny Claffey / Rachael Dillon	2; 6	6; 4	[10] [6]

=== Morocco vs. Madagascar ===
Morocco
1
Terraten Club, Chișinău, Moldova
11 May 2013
Red clay (outdoors)

Madagascar
1

			1	2	3
1	(Morocco) (Madagascar)	Lina Qostal; Hariniony Andriamananarivo	6; 2	6; 2
2	(Morocco) (Madagascar)	Nadia Lalami; Zarah Razafimahatratra	5; 7	4; 6
3	(Morocco) (Madagascar)	Nadia Lalami / Lina Qostal; Hariniony Andriamananarivo / Zarah Razafimahatratra	5; 7	2; 2		not played

== 9th to 12th play-offs ==
The third placed teams of each pool were drawn in head-to-head rounds to find the equal ninth and eleventh placed teams.

=== Armenia vs. Kenya ===
Armenia
2
Terraten Club, Chișinău, Moldova
11 May 2013
Red clay (outdoors)

Kenya
1

			1	2	3
1	(Armenia) (Kenya)	Ofelya Poghosyan; Caroline Oduor	6; 0	6^{4} 7^{7}	4; 6
2	(Armenia) (Kenya)	Anna Movsisyan; Shufaa Changawa Ruwa	6; 2	6; 2
3	(Armenia) (Kenya)	Nune Khachatryan / Anna Movsisyan; Caroline Oduor / Evelyn Otula	6; 0	6; 3

=== Namibia vs. Norway ===
Namibia
0
Terraten Club, Chișinău, Moldova
11 May 2013
Red clay (outdoors)

Norway
3

			1	2	3
1	(Namibia) (Norway)	Liniques Theron; Melanie Stokke	3; 6	2; 6
2	(Namibia) (Norway)	Rieke Honiball; Hedda Ødegaard	3; 6	3; 6
3	(Namibia) (Norway)	Rieke Honiball / Liniques Theron; Andrea Raaholt / Melanie Stokke	2; 6	4; 6

== Final placements ==
Placing	Teams	
Promoted	Egypt	Liechtenstein
Third	Denmark	Moldova
Fifth	Malta	–
Sixth	Morocco	Madagascar
Eighth	Ireland	–
Ninth	Armenia	Norway
Eleventh	Kenya	Namibia
Thirteenth	Cyprus	–

- Egypt and Liechtenstein advanced to Europe/Africa Group II in 2014.

== See also ==
- Fed Cup structure
