= Milica Šljukić =

Montenegrin tennis player

- Country (sports): Montenegro
- Born: 29 May 1996 (age 28)
- Prize money: $1,840

Singles
- Career record: 6–26
- Highest ranking: 1,186 (30 September 2013)

Doubles
- Career record: 1–8

Team competitions
- Fed Cup: 0–2
- Last updated on: 28 December 2020.

Milica Šljukić (born 29 May 1996) is a Montenegrin tennis player.

Šljukić career high singles ranking is world No. 1,186, which she achieved on 30 September 2013.

Playing for Montenegro at the Fed Cup, Šljukić has a win–loss record of 0–2.

== National representation ==
=== Fed Cup ===
Šljukić made her Fed Cup debut for Montenegro in 2012, while the team was competing in the Europe/Africa Zone Group II, when she was 15 years and 327 days old.

==== Fed Cup (0–2) ====
Group membership World Group (0–0) World Group Play-off (0–0) World Group II (0–0) World Group II Play-off (0–0) Europe/Africa Group (0–2)	Matches by surface Hard (0–0) Clay (0–2) Grass (0–0) Carpet (0–0)	Matches by type Singles (0–0) Doubles (0–2)	Matches by setting Indoors (0–0) Outdoors (0–2)

===== Doubles (0–2) =====
Edition	Stage	Date	Location	Against	Surface	Partner	Opponents	W/L	Score
2012 Fed Cup; Europe/Africa Zone Group II	Pool A	20 April 2012	Cairo, Egypt	South Africa	Clay	Vladica Babić	Lynn Kiro; Madrie Le Roux	L	1–6, 2–6
2012 Fed Cup; Europe/Africa Zone Group II	Promotional Play-off	21 April 2012	Cairo, Egypt	(Georgia (country)) Georgia	Clay	Vladica Babić	Sofia Kvatsabaia; Sofia Shapatava	L	3–6, 4–6
