= 2013 Fed Cup Europe/Africa Zone =

Subsection of tennis competition

The Europe/Africa Zone was one of three zones of regional competition in the 2013 Fed Cup.

== Group I ==
- Venue: Municipal Tennis Club, Eilat, Israel (hard, outdoors)
- Date: 6–10 February

The sixteen teams were divided into four pools of four teams. The four pool winners will take part in play-offs to determine the two nations advancing to the World Group II Play-offs. The nations finishing last in their pools will take part in relegation play-offs, with the two losing nations being relegated to Group II for 2014.

=== Pools ===
	Pool A	CRO	BLR	AUT	GEO
1	Croatia (3–0)		3–0	2–1	3–0
2	Belarus (2–1)	0–3		2–1	3–0
3	Austria (1–2)	1–2	1–2		3–0
4	Georgia (0–3)	0–3	0–3	0–3	

	Pool B	GBR	HUN	POR	BIH
1	Great Britain (3–0)		2–1	2–1	3–0
2	Hungary (2–1)	1–2		3–0	3–0
3	Portugal (1–2)	1–2	0–3		2–1
4	Bosnia and Herzegovina (0–3)	0–3	0–3	1–2	

	Pool C	POL	ISR	ROU	TUR
1	Poland (3–0)		2–1	2–1	3–0
2	Israel (1–2)	1–2		1–2	2–1
3	Romania (1–2)	1–2	2–1		1–2
4	Turkey (1–2)	0–3	1–2	2–1	

	Pool D	BUL	NED	SLO	LUX
1	Bulgaria (3–0)		3–0	3–0	3–0
2	Netherlands (2–1)	3–0		0–3	3–0
3	Slovenia (1–2)	0–3	0–3		2–1
4	Luxembourg (0–3)	1–2	0–3	0–3	

=== Play-offs ===
Placing	A Team	Score	C Team
Promotional	Croatia	1–2	Poland
5th–8th	Belarus	0–2	Israel
9th–12th	Austria	2–1	Romania
Relegation	Georgia	1–2	Turkey

Placing	B Team	Score	D Team
Promotional	Great Britain	2–0	Bulgaria
5th–8th	Hungary	2–0	Netherlands
9th–12th	Portugal	W/O	Slovenia
Relegation	Bosnia and Herzegovina	0–2	Luxembourg

- Poland and Great Britain advanced to World Group II play-offs.
- Georgia and Bosnia and Herzegovina were relegated to Europe/Africa Group II in 2014.

== Group II ==
- Venue: Bellevue Club, Ulcinj, Montenegro (outdoor clay)
- Dates: 17–20 April

The eight teams were divided into two pools of four teams. The two nations placing first and second will take part in play-offs to determine the two nations advancing to Group I. The nations finishing last in their pools will take part in relegation play-offs, with the two losing nations being relegated to Group III for 2014.

=== Pools ===
	Pool A	TUN	LAT	FIN	EST
1	Tunisia (3–0)		2–1	2–1	2–1
2	Latvia (2–1)	1–2		3–0	3–0
3	Finland (1–2)	1–2	0–3		2–0
4	Estonia (0–3)	1–2	0–3	0–2	

	Pool B	MNE	LTU	RSA	GRE
1	Montenegro (3–0)		3–0	2–1	2–1
2	Lithuania (2–1)	0–3		2–1	2–1
3	South Africa (1–2)	1–2	1–2		2–1
4	Greece (0–3)	1–2	1–2	1–2	

=== Play-offs ===
Placing	A Team	Score	B Team
Promotion	Tunisia	2–1	Lithuania
Promotion	Latvia	2–1	Montenegro
Relegation	Finland	2–1	Greece
Relegation	Estonia	1–2	South Africa

- Latvia and Tunisia advanced to Europe/Africa Group I in 2014.
- Estonia and Greece were relegated to Europe/Africa Group III in 2014.

== Group III ==
Venue: Terraten Club, Chișinău, Moldova (outdoor clay)

Dates: 8–11 May

The thirteen teams were divided into three pools of three teams and one pool of four. The four pool winners will take part in play-offs to determine the two nations advancing to Group II for 2014. The fourth nation in Pool D will not compete in the positional play-offs.

=== Pools ===
	Pool A	EGY	MLT	ARM
1	Egypt (2–0)		3–0	3–0
2	Malta (1–1)	0–3		2–1
3	Armenia (0–2)	0–3	1–2	

	Pool B	DEN	MAR	NAM
1	Denmark (2–0)		3–0	3–0
2	Morocco (1–1)	0–3		3–0
3	Namibia (0–2)	0–3	0–3	

	Pool C	MDA	IRL	KEN
1	Moldova (2–0)		2–1	3–0
2	Ireland (1–1)	1–2		3–0
3	Kenya (0–2)	0–3	0–3	

	Pool D	LIE	MAD	NOR	CYP
1	Liechtenstein (2–1)		3–0	3–0	0–3
2	Madagascar (2–1)	0–3		2–1	2–1
3	Norway (1–2)	0–3	1–2		3–0
4	Cyprus (1–2)	3–0	1–2	0–3	

=== Play-offs ===
Placing	A Team	Score	C Team
Promotional	Egypt	2–0	Moldova
5th–8th	Malta	2–1	Ireland
9th–12th	Armenia	2–1	Kenya

Placing	B Team	Score	D Team
Promotional	Denmark	1–2	Liechtenstein
5th–8th	Morocco	1–1	Madagascar
9th–12th	Namibia	0–3	Norway
13th	N/A	–	Cyprus

- Egypt and Liechtenstein advanced to Europe/Africa Group II in 2014.

== See also ==
- Fed Cup structure
