= Seheno Razafindramaso =

Malagasy tennis player

- Country (sports): Madagascar
- Born: 25 July 1986 (age 38)
- Plays: Left-handed (two-handed backhand)
- Prize money: $3,098

Singles
- Career record: 7 - 15
- Career titles: 0
- Highest ranking: 964 (10 March 2008)

Doubles
- Career record: 11 - 15
- Career titles: 1 ITF
- Highest ranking: 727 (10 March 2008)

Team competitions
- Fed Cup: 1–0
Medal record
Representing Madagascar
Women's Tennis
African Games
Bronze medal – third place	2007 Algiers	Singles

Seheno Razafindramaso (born 25 July 1986) is a retired Malagasy tennis player.

Razafindramaso has a WTA singles career high ranking of 964 achieved on 10 March 2008. She also has a WTA doubles career high ranking of 727 achieved on 10 March 2008.

Playing for Madagascar in Fed Cup, Razafindramaso has a W/L record of 1–0.

== ITF finals (0–1) ==
=== Doubles (0–1) ===
Legend $100,000 tournaments $80,000 tournaments $60,000 tournaments $25,000 tournaments $15,000 tournaments $10,000 tournaments	Finals by surface Hard (0–0) Clay (0–1) Grass (0–0) Carpet (0–0)

Result	W–L	Date	Tournament	Tier	Surface	Partner	Opponents	Score
Loss	0–1	Jun 2007	ITF Annaba, Algeria	10,000	Clay	(Russia) Anna Savitskaya	(Algeria) Assia Halo (Algeria) Samia Medjahdi	5–7, 5–7

== ITF Junior Finals ==
Grand Slam
Category GA
Category G1
Category G2
Category G3
Category G4
Category G5

=== Singles Finals (0–1) ===
Outcome	W–L	Date	Tournament	Grade	Surface	Opponent	Score
Runner-up	0–1	Aug 2003	Harare, Zimbabwe	G3	Hard	(South Africa) Kate McDade	6–3, 4–6, 0–6

=== Doubles (12–4) ===
Outcome	W–L	Date	Tournament	Grade	Surface	Partner	Opponents	Score
Runner-up	0–1	Aug 2003	Lusaka, Zambia	G4	Clay	(France) Sarah Aulombard	(Zimbabwe) Fadzai Masiyazi (Zimbabwe) Fadzai Mawisire	6–4, 4–6, 4–6

== National representation ==
=== Fed Cup ===
Razafindramaso made her Fed Cup debut for Madagascar in 2016, while the team was competing in the Europe/Africa Zone Group III, when she was 29 years and 264 days old.

==== Fed Cup (1–0) ====
Group membership World Group (0–0) World Group Play-off (0–0) World Group II (0–0) World Group II Play-off (0–0) Europe/Africa Group (1–0)	Matches by surface Hard (0–0) Clay (1–0) Grass (0–0) Carpet (0–0)	Matches by type Singles (0–0) Doubles (1–0)	Matches by setting Indoors (0–0) Outdoors (1–0)

===== Doubles (1–0) =====
Edition	Stage	Date	Location	Against	Surface	Partner	Opponents	W/L	Score
2016 Fed Cup; Europe/Africa Zone Group III	Pool C	14 April 2016	Ulcinj, Montenegro	Algeria	Clay	Zarah Razafimahatratra	Amira Benaïssa; Lynda Benkaddour	W	6–4, 3–6, 7–6^{(7–1)}
