= 2019 Fed Cup Europe/Africa Zone Group III – Pool A (Ulcinj) =

Subsection of tennis competition

Pool A (Ulcinj) of the 2019 Fed Cup Europe/Africa Group III was one of four pools in the Europe/Africa Group III of the 2019 Fed Cup. Four teams competed in a round robin competition, with the top team and bottom teams proceeding to their respective section of the play-offs: the top team played for advancement to Group II.

== Standings ==
		NOR	MNE	ARM	RR; W–L	Set; W–L	Game; W–L	Standings
1	Norway		3–0	3–0	2–0	12–2 (86%)	79–28 (74%)	1
12	Montenegro	0–3		3–0	1–1	8–7 (53%)	65–55 (54%)	2
5	Armenia	0–3	0–3		0–2	1–12 (8%)	15–76 (16%)	3

Standings are determined by: 1. number of wins; 2. if two teams have the same number of wins, head-to-head record; 3. if three teams have the same number of wins, (a) number of matches won in the group, then (b) percentage of sets won in the group, then (c) percentage of games won in the group, then (d) Fed Cup rankings.

== Round robin ==
=== Armenia vs. Montenegro ===
Armenia
0
Ulcinj Bellevue, Ulcinj, Montenegro
17 April 2019
Clay

Montenegro
3

			1	2	3
1	(Armenia) (Montenegro)	Irena Muradyan; Anja Drašković	6; 4	2; 6	0; 6
2	(Armenia) (Montenegro)	Gabriella Akopyan; Vladica Babić	0; 6	0; 6
3	(Armenia) (Montenegro)	Yeva Avetisyan / Evelina Martirosyan; Vladica Babić / Divna Ratković	2; 6	2; 6

=== Norway vs. Armenia ===
Norway
3
Ulcinj Bellevue, Ulcinj, Montenegro
18 April 2019
Clay

Armenia
0

			1	2	3
1	(Norway) (Armenia)	Malene Helgø; Evelina Martirosyan	6; 0	6; 0
2	(Norway) (Armenia)	Melanie Stokke; Gabriella Akopyan	6; 0	6; 0
3	(Norway) (Armenia)	Astrid Wanja Brune Olsen / Malene Helgø; Yeva Avetisyan / Irena Muradyan	6; 0	6; 3

=== Norway vs. Montenegro ===
Norway
3
Ulc0inj Bellevue, Ulcinj, Montenegro
19 April 2019
Clay

Montenegro
0

			1	2	3
1	(Norway) (Montenegro)	Malene Helgø; Anja Drašković	6; 1	3; 6	6; 4
2	(Norway) (Montenegro)	Melanie Stokke; Vladica Babić	6; 2	3; 6	7; 5
3	(Norway) (Montenegro)	Astrid Wanja Brune Olsen / Malene Helgø; Anja Drašković / Divna Ratković	6; 0	6; 1

== See also ==
- Fed Cup structure
