= 2017 Fed Cup Europe/Africa Zone Group II – Pool B =

Women's tennis competitions in Lithuania

Group B of the 2017 Fed Cup Europe/Africa Zone Group II was one of two pools in the Europe/Africa zone of the 2017 Fed Cup. Four teams competed in a round robin competition, with the top two teams and the bottom two teams proceeding to their respective sections of the play-offs: the top two teams played for advancement to Group I, while the bottom two teams faced potential relegation to Group III.

== Standings ==
		DEN	LUX	EGY	LTU	RR; W–L	Set; W–L	Game; W–L	Standings
52	Denmark		2–1	2–1	3–0	3–0	15–4 (79%)	107–72 (60%)	1
73	Luxembourg	1–2		1–2	3–0	1–2	11–9 (55%)	96–80 (55%)	2
63	Egypt	1–2	2–1		1–2	1–2	9–11 (45%)	88–99 (47%)	3
57	Lithuania	0–3	0–3	2–1		1–2	4–15 (21%)	66–106 (38%)	4

Standings are determined by: 1. number of wins; 2. if two teams have the same number of wins, head-to-head record; 3. if three teams have the same number of wins, (a) number of matches won in the group, then (b) percentage of sets won in the group, then (c) percentage of games won in the group, then (d) Fed Cup rankings.

== Round-robin ==
=== Denmark vs. Luxembourg ===
Denmark
2
Šiauliai Tennis School, Šiauliai, Lithuania
19 April 2017
Hard (indoors)

Luxembourg
1

			1	2	3
1	(Denmark) (Luxembourg)	Emilie Francati; Eléonora Molinaro	3; 6	6; 3	1; 6
2	(Denmark) (Luxembourg)	Karen Barritza; Mandy Minella	6; 2	7^{7} 6^{2}
3	(Denmark) (Luxembourg)	Karen Barritza / Emilie Francati; Mandy Minella / Claudine Schaul	6; 4	7^{7} 6^{4}

=== Lithuania vs. Egypt ===
Lithuania
2
Šiauliai Tennis School, Šiauliai, Lithuania
19 April 2017
Hard (indoors)

Egypt
1

			1	2	3
1	(Lithuania) (Egypt)	Paulina Bakaitė; Mai El Kamash	6; 2	7^{7} 6^{2}
2	(Lithuania) (Egypt)	Joana Eidukonytė; Sandra Samir	5; 7	3; 6
3	(Lithuania) (Egypt)	Joana Eidukonytė / Gerda Zykutė; Ola Abou Zekry / Sandra Samir	6; 1	4; 6	7; 5

=== Denmark vs. Egypt ===
Denmark
2
Šiauliai Tennis School, Šiauliai, Lithuania
20 April 2017
Hard (indoors)

Egypt
1

			1	2	3
1	(Denmark) (Egypt)	Emilie Francati; Mai El Kamash	6; 3	6; 2
2	(Denmark) (Egypt)	Karen Barritza; Sandra Samir	6; 3	6; 2
3	(Denmark) (Egypt)	Mai Grage / Clara Tauson; Ola Abou Zekry / Rana Sherif Ahmed	6^{5} 7^{7}	4; 6

=== Lithuania vs. Luxembourg ===
Lithuania
0
Šiauliai Tennis School, Šiauliai, Lithuania
20 April 2017
Hard (indoors)

Luxembourg
3

			1	2	3
1	(Lithuania) (Luxembourg)	Paulina Bakaitė; Eléonora Molinaro	1; 6	4; 6
2	(Lithuania) (Luxembourg)	Joana Eidukonytė; Mandy Minella	0; 6	3; 6
3	(Lithuania) (Luxembourg)	Gabija Drūteikaitė / Gerda Zykutė; Eléonora Molinaro / Claudine Schaul	2; 6	1; 6

=== Denmark vs. Lithuania ===
Denmark
3
Šiauliai Tennis School, Šiauliai, Lithuania
21 April 2017
Hard (indoors)

Lithuania
0

			1	2	3
1	(Denmark) (Lithuania)	Emilie Francati; Paulina Bakaitė	6; 2	7^{7} 6^{2}
2	(Denmark) (Lithuania)	Karen Barritza; Joana Eidukonytė	6; 4	6; 1
3	(Denmark) (Lithuania)	Emilie Francati / Mai Grage; Joana Eidukonytė / Gerda Zykutė	6; 1	6; 2

=== Egypt vs. Luxembourg ===
Egypt
2
Šiauliai Tennis School, Šiauliai, Lithuania
21 April 2017
Hard (indoors)

Luxembourg
1

			1	2	3
1	(Egypt) (Luxembourg)	Ola Abou Zekry; Eléonora Molinaro	5; 7	0; 6
2	(Egypt) (Luxembourg)	Sandra Samir; Mandy Minella	1; 0			retired
3	(Egypt) (Luxembourg)	Sandra Samir / Rana Sherif Ahmed; Tiffany Cornelius / Claudine Schaul	3; 6	6; 4	6; 4
