= Nantenaina Ramalalaharivololona =

Malagasy tennis player

- Country (sports): Madagascar
- Born: 10 July 1987 (age 38) Antananarivo, Madagascar
- Retired: 2017
- Plays: Left-handed (two-handed backhand)
- Prize money: $2,787

Singles
- Career record: 4–13
- Career titles: 0

Doubles
- Career record: 8–14
- Career titles: 1 ITF
- Highest ranking: No. 913 (27 December 2010)
- Last updated on: 20 August 2014.

Nantenaina Ramalalaharivololona (born 10 July 1987 in Antananarivo) is a Malagasy tennis player.

Ramalalaharivololona has won one doubles title on the ITF tour in her career. On 20 December 2014, she peaked at world number 916 in the doubles rankings.

Playing for Madagascar at the Fed Cup, Ramalalaharivololona has a win-loss record of 4–6.

Ramalalaharivololona retired from tennis in 2017.

== ITF finals ==
=== Doubles: 1 (1–0) ===
Legend $100,000 tournaments $75,000 tournaments $50,000 tournaments $25,000 tournaments $10,000 tournaments	Finals by surface Hard (1–0) Clay (0–0) Grass (0–0) Carpet (0–0)

Outcome	No.	Date	Tournament	Surface	Partner	Opponents	Score
Winner	1.	20 November 2010	Équeurdreville, France	Hard	(France) Florence Haring	(Netherlands) Kim Kilsdonk (Netherlands) Nicolette Van Uitert	1–6, 6–3, 6–4

== Fed Cup participation ==
=== Singles ===
Edition	Stage	Date	Location	Against	Surface	Opponent	W/L	Score
2013 Fed Cup; Europe/Africa Zone Group III	R/R	8 May 2013	Chișinău, Moldova	(Liechtenstein) Liechtenstein	Clay	(Liechtenstein) Stephanie Vogt	L	0–6, 2–6
2013 Fed Cup; Europe/Africa Zone Group III	R/R	9 May 2013	Chișinău, Moldova	Cyprus	Clay	(Cyprus) Mara Argyriou	L	3–6, 2–6
2014 Fed Cup; Europe/Africa Zone Group III	R/R	5 February 2014	Tallinn, Estonia	(Denmark) Denmark	Hard (i)	(Denmark) Mai Grage	L	2–6, 3–6
2014 Fed Cup; Europe/Africa Zone Group III	R/R	6 February 2014	Tallinn, Estonia	(Norway) Norway	Hard (i)	(Norway) Ida Seljevoll Skancke	W	6–0, 6–2
2014 Fed Cup; Europe/Africa Zone Group III	P/O	8 February 2014	Tallinn, Estonia	(Armenia) Armenia	Hard (i)	(Armenia) Lusine Chobanyan	W	6–1, 6–3

=== Doubles ===
Edition	Stage	Date	Location	Against	Surface	Partner	Opponents	W/L	Score
2013 Fed Cup; Europe/Africa Zone Group III	R/R	8 May 2013	Chișinău, Moldova	Liechtenstein	Clay	(Madagascar) Hariniony Andriamananarivo	(Liechtenstein) Stephanie Vogt (Liechtenstein) Kathinka von Deichmann	L	3–6, 4–6
2013 Fed Cup; Europe/Africa Zone Group III	R/R	9 May 2013	Chișinău, Moldova	Cyprus	Clay	(Madagascar) Zarah Razafimahatratra	(Cyprus) Mara Argyriou (Cyprus) Maria Siopacha	W	6–3, 6–3
2014 Fed Cup; Europe/Africa Zone Group III	R/R	5 February 2014	Tallinn, Estonia	Denmark	Hard (i)	(Madagascar) Oceane Razakaboana	(Denmark) Karen Barbat (Denmark) Mai Grage	L	1–6, 1–6
2014 Fed Cup; Europe/Africa Zone Group III	R/R	6 February 2014	Tallinn, Estonia	Norway	Hard (i)	(Madagascar) Sandra Andriamarosoa	(Norway) Ida Seljevoll Skancke (Norway) Melanie Stokke	L	4–6, 3–6
2014 Fed Cup; Europe/Africa Zone Group III	P/O	8 February 2014	Tallinn, Estonia	Armenia	Hard (i)	(Madagascar) Sandra Andriamarosoa	(Armenia) Ani Amiraghyan (Armenia) Milena Avetisyan	W	7–5, 6–4
