= 2012 Fed Cup Europe/Africa Zone Group II – Pool B =

International tennis competition

Group B of the 2012 Fed Cup Europe/Africa Zone Group II was one of two pools in the Europe/Africa Zone Group II of the 2012 Fed Cup. Four teams competed in a round robin competition, with the top team and the bottom team proceeding to their respective sections of the play-offs: the top teams played for advancement to Group I, while the bottom team faced potential relegation to Group III.

		(Georgia (country)) GEO	(Latvia) LAT	(Turkey) TUR	(Norway) NOR	RR; W–L	Set; W–L	Game; W–L	Standings
54	Georgia		2–1	3–0	3–0	3–0	16–4	116–72	1
58	Latvia	1–2		1–2	3–0	1–2	9–9	94–91	3
62	Turkey	0–3	2–1		3–0	2–1	11–9	95–81	2
68	Norway	0–3	0–3	0–3		0–3	2–18	57–118	4

== Georgia vs. Norway ==
Georgia
3
Golf El Solaimaneyah Club, Cairo, Egypt
18 April 2012
Red clay (outdoors)

Norway
0

			1	2	3
1	(Georgia (country)) (Norway)	Sofia Kvatsabaia; Hedda Odegaard	6; 4	6; 3
2	(Georgia (country)) (Norway)	Anna Tatishvili; Emma Flood	6; 0	6; 0
3	(Georgia (country)) (Norway)	Sofia Kvatsabaia / Sofia Shapatava; Ulrikke Eikeri / Emma Flood	6^{6} 7^{8}	6; 4	6; 4

== Latvia vs. Turkey ==
Latvia
1
Golf El Solaimaneyah Club, Cairo, Egypt
18 April 2012
Red clay (outdoors)

Turkey
2

			1	2	3
1	(Latvia) (Turkey)	Līga Dekmeijere; Pemra Özgen	4; 6	7; 5	6; 3
2	(Latvia) (Turkey)	Diāna Marcinkēviča; Çağla Büyükakçay	2; 6	0; 6
3	(Latvia) (Turkey)	Līga Dekmeijere / Diāna Marcinkēviča; Çağla Büyükakçay / Pemra Özgen	3; 6	3; 6

== Georgia vs. Latvia ==
Georgia
2
Golf El Solaimaneyah Club, Cairo, Egypt
19 April 2012
Red clay (outdoors)

Latvia
1

			1	2	3
1	(Georgia (country)) (Latvia)	Sofia Shapatava; Līga Dekmeijere	2; 6	7^{7} 6^{0}	6; 1
2	(Georgia (country)) (Latvia)	Anna Tatishvili; Diāna Marcinkēviča	7; 5	6; 2
3	(Georgia (country)) (Latvia)	Sofia Kvatsabaia / Sofia Shapatava; Laura Gulbe / Diāna Marcinkēviča	6^{5} 7^{7}	3; 6

== Turkey vs. Norway ==
Turkey
3
Golf El Solaimaneyah Club, Cairo, Egypt
19 April 2012
Red clay (outdoors)

Norway
0

			1	2	3
1	(Turkey) (Norway)	Pemra Özgen; Hedda Odegaard	6; 0	7^{7} 6^{2}
2	(Turkey) (Norway)	Çağla Büyükakçay; Emma Flood	6; 0	6; 1
3	(Turkey) (Norway)	Melis Sezer / İpek Soylu; Emma Flood / Hedda Odegaard	3; 6	6; 2	6; 4

== Georgia vs. Turkey ==
Georgia
3
Golf El Solaimaneyah Club, Cairo, Egypt
20 April 2012
Red clay (outdoors)

Turkey
0

			1	2	3
1	(Georgia (country)) (Turkey)	Sofia Shapatava; Pemra Özgen	6; 2	6; 2
2	(Georgia (country)) (Turkey)	Anna Tatishvili; Çağla Büyükakçay	6; 4	6; 2
3	(Georgia (country)) (Turkey)	Sofia Kvatsabaia / Anna Tatishvili; Melis Sezer / İpek Soylu	6; 2	7; 5

== Latvia vs. Norway ==
Latvia
3
Golf El Solaimaneyah Club, Cairo, Egypt
20 April 2012
Red clay (outdoors)

Norway
0

			1	2	3
1	(Latvia) (Norway)	Līga Dekmeijere; Emma Flood	6; 1	6; 2
2	(Latvia) (Norway)	Diāna Marcinkēviča; Ulrikke Eikeri	6; 3	6; 3
3	(Latvia) (Norway)	Laura Gulbe / Diāna Marcinkēviča; Emma Flood / Hedda Ødegaard	6; 3	6; 4

== See also ==
- Fed Cup structure
