= 2000 Fed Cup Europe/Africa Zone Group II – Pool D =

Group D of the 2000 Fed Cup Europe/Africa Zone Group II was one of four pools in the Europe/Africa zone of the 2000 Fed Cup. Five teams competed in a round robin competition, with the top team advancing to Group I for 2001.

	(Estonia) EST	(Moldova) MDA	(Portugal) POR	(Algeria) ALG	(Madagascar) MAD	(Lesotho) LES	Match; W–L	Set; W–L	Game; W–L	Standings
Estonia		2–1	3–0	3–0	3–0	3–0	5–0	24–3	159–54	1
Moldova	1–2		2–1	3–0	1–0	3–0	4–1	22–7	151–92	2
Portugal	0–1	1–2		2–1	3–0	3–0	3–2	18–8	139–99	3
Algeria	0–3	0–3	1–2		2–1	1–0	2–3	10–19	108–138	4
Madagascar	0–3	0–1	0–3	1–2		2–1	1–4	6–20	80–145	5
Lesotho	0–3	0–3	0–3	0–1	1–2		0–5	3–24	48–157	6

== Estonia vs. Moldova ==
Estonia
2
Estoril T.C., Estoril, Portugal
28 March 2000
Red clay (outdoors)

Moldova
1

			1	2	3
1	(Estonia) (Moldova)	Kaia Kanepi; Natalia Volcova	6; 2	6; 0
2	(Estonia) (Moldova)	Maret Ani; Svetlana Komleva	4; 6	1; 6
3	(Estonia) (Moldova)	Maret Ani / Kaia Kanepi; Svetlana Komleva / Natalia Volcova	6^{5} 7^{7}	6; 1	6; 0

== Portugal vs. Lesotho ==
Portugal
3
Estoril T.C., Estoril, Portugal
28 March 2000
Red clay (outdoors)

Lesotho
0

			1	2	3
1	(Portugal) (Lesotho)	Cristina Correia; Tankiso Letseka	6; 0	6; 1
2	(Portugal) (Lesotho)	Helga Vieira; Mamotebang Molise	6; 1	6; 0
3	(Portugal) (Lesotho)	Angela Cardoso / Ana Catarina Nogueira; Tankiso Letseka / Mamotebang Molise	6; 1	6; 3

== Algeria vs. Madagascar ==
Algeria
2
Estoril T.C., Estoril, Portugal
28 March 2000
Red clay (outdoors)

Madagascar
1

			1	2	3
1	(Algeria) (Madagascar)	Siham-Soumeya Ben Nacer; Valisoa Rafolomanantsiatosika	6; 1	6; 1
2	(Algeria) (Madagascar)	Feriel Esseghir; Aina Rafolomanantsiatosika	5; 7	4; 6
3	(Algeria) (Madagascar)	Siham-Soumeya Ben Nacer / Feriel Esseghir; Aina Rafolomanantsiatosika / Solange Rasoarivelo	6; 3	6; 2

== Estonia vs. Lesotho ==
Estonia
3
Estoril T.C., Estoril, Portugal
29 March 2000
Red clay (outdoors)

Lesotho
0

			1	2	3
1	(Estonia) (Lesotho)	Maret Ani; Tankiso Letseka	6; 0	6; 0
2	(Estonia) (Lesotho)	Liina Suurvarik; Mamotebang Molise	6; 0	6; 0
3	(Estonia) (Lesotho)	Maret Ani / Liina Suurvarik; Tankiso Letseka / Mamotebang Molise	6; 1	6; 1

== Moldova vs. Algeria ==
Moldova
3
Estoril T.C., Estoril, Portugal
29 March 2000
Red clay (outdoors)

Algeria
0

			1	2	3
1	(Moldova) (Algeria)	Natalia Volcova; Siham-Soumeya Ben Nacer	6; 0	6; 3
2	(Moldova) (Algeria)	Svetlana Komleva; Feriel Esseghir	6; 3	6; 3
3	(Moldova) (Algeria)	Svetlana Komleva / Natalia Volcova; Sihem Ben Youcef / Feriel Esseghir	6; 1	2; 6	6; 3

== Portugal vs. Madagascar ==
Portugal
3
Estoril T.C., Estoril, Portugal
29 March 2000
Red clay (outdoors)

Madagascar
0

			1	2	3
1	(Portugal) (Madagascar)	Angela Cardoso; Vonjiniana Rasamuel	6; 1	6; 4
2	(Portugal) (Madagascar)	Ana Catarina Nogueira; Aina Rafolomanantsiatosika	6; 2	6; 3
3	(Portugal) (Madagascar)	Cristina Correia / Helga Vieira; Valisoa Rafolomanantsiatosika / Solange Rasoarivelo	6; 1	6; 2

== Estonia vs. Algeria ==
Estonia
3
Estoril T.C., Estoril, Portugal
30 March 2000
Red clay (outdoors)

Algeria
0

			1	2	3
1	(Estonia) (Algeria)	Kaia Kanepi; Siham-Soumeya Ben Nacer	7; 5	6; 1
2	(Estonia) (Algeria)	Maret Ani; Feriel Esseghir	6; 4	6; 1
3	(Estonia) (Algeria)	Maret Ani / Liina Suurvarik; Sihem Ben Youcef / Feriel Esseghir	6; 3	6; 1

== Moldova vs. Portugal ==
Moldova
2
Estoril T.C., Estoril, Portugal
30 March 2000
Red clay (outdoors)

Portugal
1

			1	2	3
1	(Moldova) (Portugal)	Natalia Volcova; Angela Cardoso	7; 5	2; 6	6; 8
2	(Moldova) (Portugal)	Svetlana Komleva; Ana Catarina Nogueira	6; 3	6; 1
3	(Moldova) (Portugal)	Elena Arabadji / Svetlana Komleva; Angela Cardoso / Cristina Correia	6; 2	6; 2

== Madagascar vs. Lesotho ==
Madagascar
2
Estoril T.C., Estoril, Portugal
30 March 2000
Red clay (outdoors)

Lesotho
1

			1	2	3
1	(Madagascar) (Lesotho)	Valisoa Rafolomanantsiatosika; Tankiso Letseka	4; 6	6^{1} 7^{7}
2	(Madagascar) (Lesotho)	Aina Rafolomanantsiatosika; Mamotebang Molise	6; 1	6; 0
3	(Madagascar) (Lesotho)	Aina Rafolomanantsiatosika / Solange Rasoarivelo; Tankiso Letseka / Mamotebang Molise	7^{8} 6^{6}	6; 3

== Estonia vs. Madagascar ==
Estonia
3
Estoril T.C., Estoril, Portugal
31 March 2000
Red clay (outdoors)

Madagascar
0

			1	2	3
1	(Estonia) (Madagascar)	Kaia Kanepi; Vonjiniana Rasamuel	6; 0	6; 0
2	(Estonia) (Madagascar)	Maret Ani; Aina Rafolomanantsiatosika	6; 2	7; 5
3	(Estonia) (Madagascar)	Kaia Kanepi / Liina Suurvarik; Valisoa Rafolomanantsiatosika / Vonjiniana Rasamuel	6; 1	6; 1

== Moldova vs. Lesotho ==
Moldova
3
Estoril T.C., Estoril, Portugal
31 March 2000
Red clay (outdoors)

Lesotho
0

			1	2	3
1	(Moldova) (Lesotho)	Olga Ćosić; Tankiso Letseka	6; 0	6; 1
2	(Moldova) (Lesotho)	Svetlana Komleva; Mamotebang Molise	6; 1	6; 1
3	(Moldova) (Lesotho)	Elena Arabadji / Olga Ćosić; Tankiso Letseka / Mamotebang Molise	6; 3	6; 2

== Portugal vs. Algeria ==
Portugal
2
Estoril T.C., Estoril, Portugal
31 March 2000
Red clay (outdoors)

Algeria
1

			1	2	3
1	(Portugal) (Algeria)	Helga Vieira; Sihem Ben Youcef	4; 6	3; 6
2	(Portugal) (Algeria)	Ana Catarina Nogueira; Feriel Esseghir	6; 4	3; 6	6; 2
3	(Portugal) (Algeria)	Angela Cardoso / Ana Catarina Nogueira; Sihem Ben Youcef / Samira Takourabet	6; 1	6; 2

== Estonia vs. Portugal ==
Estonia
1
Estoril T.C., Estoril, Portugal
1 April 2000
Red clay (outdoors)

Portugal
0

			1	2	3
1	(Estonia) (Portugal)	Kaia Kanepi; Angela Cardoso	6; 1	6; 4
2	(Estonia) (Portugal)	Maret Ani; Ana Catarina Nogueira	2; 1			not completed
3	(Estonia) (Portugal)					not played

== Moldova vs. Madagascar ==
Moldova
1
Estoril T.C., Estoril, Portugal
1 April 2000
Red clay (outdoors)

Madagascar
0

			1	2	3
1	(Moldova) (Madagascar)	Natalia Volcova; Valisoa Rafolomanantsiatosika	5; 7	6; 2	8; 6
2	(Moldova) (Madagascar)	Svetlana Komleva; Solange Rasoarivelo	4; 0			not completed
3	(Moldova) (Madagascar)					not played

== Algeria vs. Lesotho ==
Algeria
1
Estoril T.C., Estoril, Portugal
1 April 2000
Red clay (outdoors)

Lesotho
0

			1	2	3
1	(Algeria) (Lesotho)	Siham-Soumeya Ben Nacer; Tankiso Letseka	2; 6	6; 3	6; 0
2	(Algeria) (Lesotho)	Feriel Esseghir; Mamotebang Molise				not played
3	(Algeria) (Lesotho)					not played

- Estonia placed first in this group and thus advanced to Group I for 2001, where they placed third in their pool of four.

== See also ==
- Fed Cup structure
