= 2016 Fed Cup Europe/Africa Zone Group III – Pool C =

International tennis competition

Pool C of the 2016 Fed Cup Europe/Africa Group III was one of four pools in the Europe/Africa Group III of the 2016 Fed Cup. Four teams competed in a round robin competition, with the top team and bottom teams proceeding to their respective sections of the play-offs: the top team played for advancement to Group II.

== Standings ==
| | | MDA | CYP | ALG | MAD | RR; W–L | Set; W–L | Game; W–L | Standings |
| 71 | Moldova | | 2–1 | 3–0 | 1–2 | 2–1 | 14–6 | 107–77 | 1 |
| 83 | Cyprus | 1–2 | | 2–1 | 2–1 | 2–1 | 11–10 | 94–95 | 3 |
| 92 | Algeria | 0–3 | 1–2 | | 0–3 | 0–3 | 4–16 | 71–111 | 4 |
| 93 | Madagascar | 2–1 | 1–2 | 3–0 | | 2–1 | 13–10 | 106–95 | 2 |

== Round-robin ==
=== Moldova vs. Madagascar ===
Moldova
1
Bellevue, Ulcinj, Montenegro
11 April 2016
Outdoor clay

Madagascar
2

| | | | 1 | 2 | 3 |
|---|---|---|---|---|---|
| 1 | (Moldova) (Madagascar) | Julia Helbet; Zarah Razafimahatratra | 1; 6 | 2; 6 |
| 2 | (Moldova) (Madagascar) | Daniela Ciobanu; Sandra Andriamarosoa | 6; 1 | 6; 4 |
| 3 | (Moldova) (Madagascar) | Daniela Ciobanu / Julia Helbet; Sandra Andriamarosoa / Zarah Razafimahatratra | 3; 6 | 6; 1 | 6^{3} 7^{7} |

=== Cyprus vs. Algeria ===
Cyprus
2
Bellevue, Ulcinj, Montenegro
11 April 2016
Outdoor clay

Algeria
1

| | | | 1 | 2 | 3 |
|---|---|---|---|---|---|
| 1 | (Cyprus) (Algeria) | Maria Siopacha; Lynda Benkaddour | 6; 3 | 6; 2 |
| 2 | (Cyprus) (Algeria) | Eliza Omirou; Amira Benaissa | 6; 3 | 7; 5 |
| 3 | (Cyprus) (Algeria) | Themis Haliou / Anna Savchenko; Amira Benaissa / Lynda Benkaddour | 3; 6 | 1; 6 |

=== Moldova vs. Algeria ===
Moldova
3
Bellevue, Ulcinj, Montenegro
12 April 2016
Outdoor clay

Algeria
0

| | | | 1 | 2 | 3 |
|---|---|---|---|---|---|
| 1 | (Moldova) (Algeria) | Adriana Sosnovschi; Lynda Benkaddour | 6; 2 | 6; 2 |
| 2 | (Moldova) (Algeria) | Daniela Ciobanu; Amira Benaissa | 6; 3 | 7; 5 |
| 3 | (Moldova) (Algeria) | Adriana Sosnovschi / Vitalia Stamat; Amira Benaissa / Lynda Benkaddour | 6; 3 | 6; 0 |

=== Cyprus vs. Madagascar ===
Cyprus
2
Bellevue, Ulcinj, Montenegro
12 April 2016
Outdoor clay

Madagascar
1

| | | | 1 | 2 | 3 |
|---|---|---|---|---|---|
| 1 | (Cyprus) (Madagascar) | Maria Siopacha; Zarah Razafimahatratra | 2; 6 | 6; 4 | 2; 6 |
| 2 | (Cyprus) (Madagascar) | Eliza Omirou; Sandra Andriamarosoa | 6; 1 | 6; 2 |
| 3 | (Cyprus) (Madagascar) | Eliza Omirou / Maria Siopacha; Sandra Andriamarosoa / Zarah Razafimahatratra | 6; 3 | 0; 6 | 6; 2 |

=== Moldova vs. Cyprus ===
Moldova
2
Bellevue, Ulcinj, Montenegro
14 April 2016
Outdoor clay

Cyprus
1

| | | | 1 | 2 | 3 |
|---|---|---|---|---|---|
| 1 | (Moldova) (Cyprus) | Adriana Sosnovschi; Maria Siopacha | 6; 1 | 6; 3 |
| 2 | (Moldova) (Cyprus) | Daniela Ciobanu; Eliza Omirou | 6^{4} 7^{7} | 6; 4 | 3; 6 |
| 3 | (Moldova) (Cyprus) | Adriana Sosnovschi / Vitalia Stamat; Eliza Omirou / Maria Siopacha | 6; 4 | 7^{7} 6^{2} |

=== Algeria vs. Madagascar ===
Algeria
0
Bellevue, Ulcinj, Montenegro
14 April 2016
Outdoor clay

Madagascar
3

| | | | 1 | 2 | 3 |
|---|---|---|---|---|---|
| 1 | (Algeria) (Madagascar) | Lynda Benkaddour; Zarah Razafimahatratra | 1; 6 | 1; 6 |
| 2 | (Algeria) (Madagascar) | Amira Benaissa; Sandra Andriamarosoa | 6; 4 | 5; 7 | 2; 6 |
| 3 | (Algeria) (Madagascar) | Amira Benaissa / Lynda Benkaddour; Zarah Razafimahatratra / Seheno Razafindramaso | 4; 6 | 6; 3 | 6^{1} 7^{7} |

== See also ==
- Fed Cup structure
