= 1997 Fed Cup Europe/Africa Zone Group II – Pool D =

International tennis competition

Group D of the 1997 Fed Cup Europe/Africa Zone Group II was one of four pools in the Europe/Africa zone of the 1996 Fed Cup. Six teams competed in a round robin competition, with the top team advancing to Group I for 1998.

	(Madagascar) MAD	(Malta) MLT	(Luxembourg) LUX	(North Macedonia) MKD	(Liechtenstein) LIE	(Botswana) BOT	(Cyprus) CYP	Match; W–L	Set; W–L	Game; W–L	Standings
Madagascar		2–1	2–1	3–0	3–0	3–0	3–0	6–0	31–6	213–77	1
Malta	1–2		2–1	3–0	3–0	3–0	3–0	5–1	28–6	185–88	2
Luxembourg	1–2	1–2		2–1	3–0	2–1	3–0	4–2	26–10	179–91	3
Macedonia	0–3	0–3	1–2		3–0	3–0	3–0	3–3	18–16	143–134	4
Liechtenstein	0–3	0–3	0–3	0–3		3–0	2–1	2–4	10–28	95–200	5
Botswana	0–3	0–3	1–2	0–3	0–3		2–1	1–5	8–31	102–220	6
Cyprus	0–3	0–3	0–3	0–3	1–2	1–2		0–6	6–30	88–191	7

== Madagascar vs. Malta ==
Madagascar
2
Ali Bey Club, Manavgat, Turkey
5 May 1997
Red clay (outdoors)

Malta
1

			1	2	3
1	(Madagascar) (Malta)	Natacha Randriantefy; Lisa Camenzuli	6; 3	6; 0
2	(Madagascar) (Malta)	Dally Randriantefy; Sarah Wetz	6; 2	6; 1
3	(Madagascar) (Malta)	Aina Rafolomanantsiatosika / Faratiana Rasoarilalao; Helen Asciak / Lisa Camenzuli	2; 6	3; 6

== Luxembourg vs. Botswana ==
Luxembourg
2
Ali Bey Club, Manavgat, Turkey
5 May 1997
Red clay (outdoors)

Botswana
1

			1	2	3
1	(Luxembourg) (Botswana)	Alexandra Scholer; Gaobolae Seleka	6; 0	6; 0
2	(Luxembourg) (Botswana)	Fabienne Thill; Kelesitse Makgale	6; 1	6; 0
3	(Luxembourg) (Botswana)	Rosabel Moyen / Fabienne Thill; Kelesitse Makgale / Gaobolae Seleka	6; 1	4; 6	3; 6

== Liechtenstein vs. Cyprus ==
Liechtenstein
2
Ali Bey Club, Manavgat, Turkey
5 May 1997
Red clay (outdoors)

Cyprus
1

			1	2	3
1	(Liechtenstein) (Cyprus)	Fabienne Gmeiner; Elya Constanta	1; 6	6; 0	6; 4
2	(Liechtenstein) (Cyprus)	Christine Vogt; Daphne Nicolatou	1; 6	0; 6
3	(Liechtenstein) (Cyprus)	Fabienne Gmeiner / Jeannine Niedhardt; Daphne Nicolatou / Eleni Pilava Papanikolaou	6; 4	7^{7} 6^{1}

== Madagascar vs. Cyprus ==
Madagascar
3
Ali Bey Club, Manavgat, Turkey
6 May 1997
Red clay (outdoors)

Cyprus
0

			1	2	3
1	(Madagascar) (Cyprus)	Natacha Randriantefy; Elya Constanta	6; 1	6; 0
2	(Madagascar) (Cyprus)	Dally Randriantefy; Daphne Nicolatou	6; 0	6; 2
3	(Madagascar) (Cyprus)	Aina Rafolomanantsiatosika / Dally Randriantefy; Daphne Nicolatou / Eleni Pilava Papanikolaou	6; 2	6; 0

== Malta vs. Liechtenstein ==
Malta
3
Ali Bey Club, Manavgat, Turkey
6 May 1997
Red clay (outdoors)

Liechtenstein
0

			1	2	3
1	(Malta) (Liechtenstein)	Helen Asciak; Fabienne Gmeiner	6; 0	6; 1
2	(Malta) (Liechtenstein)	Lisa Camenzuli; Christine Vogt	7; 5	6; 1
3	(Malta) (Liechtenstein)	Helen Asciak / Lisa Camenzuli; Fabienne Gmeiner / Jeannine Niedhardt	6; 0	6; 0

== Macedonia vs. Botswana ==
Macedonia
3
Ali Bey Club, Manavgat, Turkey
6 May 1997
Red clay (outdoors)

Botswana
0

			1	2	3
1	(North Macedonia) (Botswana)	Elena Manevska; Gaobolae Seleka	6; 4	6; 0
2	(North Macedonia) (Botswana)	Biljana Trpeska; Kelesitse Makgale	6; 0	6; 1
3	(North Macedonia) (Botswana)	Biljana Trpeska / Zdenka Videnova; Kelesitse Makgale / Gaobolae Seleka	7; 5	6; 3

== Malta vs. Luxembourg ==
Malta
3
Ali Bey Club, Manavgat, Turkey
7 May 1997
Red clay (outdoors)

Luxembourg
0

			1	2	3
1	(Malta) (Luxembourg)	Helen Asciak; Fabienne Thill	6; 3	6; 3
2	(Malta) (Luxembourg)	Lisa Camenzuli; Rosabel Moyen	2; 6	5; 7
3	(Malta) (Luxembourg)	Helen Asciak / Lisa Camenzuli; Rosabel Moyen / Alexandra Scholer	6; 3	6; 1

== Macedonia vs. Cyprus ==
Macedonia
2
Ali Bey Club, Manavgat, Turkey
7 May 1997
Red clay (outdoors)

Cyprus
1

			1	2	3
1	(North Macedonia) (Cyprus)	Zdenka Videnova; Elya Constanta	6; 2	6; 0
2	(North Macedonia) (Cyprus)	Biljana Trpeska; Daphne Nicolatou	7^{7} 6^{4}	6; 4
3	(North Macedonia) (Cyprus)	Biljana Trpeska / Zdenka Videnova; Daphne Nicolatou / Eleni Pilava Papanikolaou	6; 2	6; 2

== Liechtenstein vs. Botswana ==
Liechtenstein
3
Ali Bey Club, Manavgat, Turkey
7 May 1997
Red clay (outdoors)

Botswana
0

			1	2	3
1	(Liechtenstein) (Botswana)	Fabienne Gmeiner; Gaobolae Seleka	6; 2	6; 0
2	(Liechtenstein) (Botswana)	Christine Vogt; Kelesitse Makgale	7; 5	7; 5
3	(Liechtenstein) (Botswana)	Fabienne Gmeiner / Jeannine Niedhardt; Kelesitse Makgale / Gaobolae Seleka	6^{3} 7^{7}	6; 1	6; 3

== Madagascar vs. Liechtenstein ==
Madagascar
3
Ali Bey Club, Manavgat, Turkey
8 May 1997
Red clay (outdoors)

Liechtenstein
0

			1	2	3
1	(Madagascar) (Liechtenstein)	Natacha Randriantefy; Fabienne Gmeiner	6; 1	6; 1
2	(Madagascar) (Liechtenstein)	Dally Randriantefy; Christine Vogt	6; 0	6; 0
3	(Madagascar) (Liechtenstein)	Natacha Randriantefy / Faratiana Rasoarilalao; Fabienne Gmeiner / Jeannine Niedhardt	6; 1	6; 3

== Malta vs. Cyprus ==
Malta
3
Ali Bey Club, Manavgat, Turkey
8 May 1997
Red clay (outdoors)

Cyprus
0

			1	2	3
1	(Malta) (Cyprus)	Helen Asciak; Eleni Pilava Papanikolaou	6; 3	6; 2
2	(Malta) (Cyprus)	Lisa Camenzuli; Daphne Nicolatou	6; 0	6; 2
3	(Malta) (Cyprus)	Helen Asciak / Lisa Camenzuli; Elya Constanta / Daphne Nicolatou	6; 0	6; 0

== Luxembourg vs. Macedonia ==
Luxembourg
3
Ali Bey Club, Manavgat, Turkey
8 May 1997
Red clay (outdoors)

Macedonia
0

			1	2	3
1	(Luxembourg) (North Macedonia)	Fabienne Thill; Zdenka Videnova	6; 1	6; 1
2	(Luxembourg) (North Macedonia)	Rosabel Moyen; Biljana Trpeska	6; 3	6; 1
3	(Luxembourg) (North Macedonia)	Fabienne Thill / Alexandra Scholer; Biljana Trpeska / Zdenka Videnova	6; 0	6; 1

== Madagascar vs. Luxembourg ==
Madagascar
3
Ali Bey Club, Manavgat, Turkey
9 May 1997
Red clay (outdoors)

Luxembourg
0

			1	2	3
1	(Madagascar) (Luxembourg)	Natacha Randriantefy; Fabienne Thill	3; 6	6; 1	6; 1
2	(Madagascar) (Luxembourg)	Dally Randriantefy; Rosabel Moyen	6; 1	6; 1
3	(Madagascar) (Luxembourg)	Aina Rafolomanantsiatosika / Natacha Randriantefy; Alexandra Scholer / Fabienne Thill	6^{4} 7^{7}	4; 6

== Malta vs. Botswana ==
Malta
3
Ali Bey Club, Manavgat, Turkey
9 May 1997
Red clay (outdoors)

Botswana
0

			1	2	3
1	(Malta) (Botswana)	Lisa Camenzuli; Gaobolae Seleka	6; 1	6; 0
2	(Malta) (Botswana)	Sarah Wetz; Kelesitse Makgale	6; 2	6; 3
3	(Malta) (Botswana)	Helen Asciak / Claire Gatt; Ninani Coyne / Onalenna Leepile	6; 0	6; 0

== Macedonia vs. Liechtenstein ==
Macedonia
3
Ali Bey Club, Manavgat, Turkey
9 May 1997
Red clay (outdoors)

Liechtenstein
0

			1	2	3
1	(North Macedonia) (Liechtenstein)	Zdenka Videnova; Fabienne Gmeiner	6; 1	6; 2
2	(North Macedonia) (Liechtenstein)	Biljana Trpeska; Christine Vogt	6; 0	6; 1
3	(North Macedonia) (Liechtenstein)	Biljana Trpeska / Zdenka Videnova; Fabienne Gmeiner / Jeannine Niedhardt	6; 2	6; 1

== Madagascar vs. Macedonia ==
Madagascar
3
Ali Bey Club, Manavgat, Turkey
10 May 1997
Red clay (outdoors)

Macedonia
0

			1	2	3
1	(Madagascar) (North Macedonia)	Natacha Randriantefy; Zdenka Videnova	6; 2	6; 2
2	(Madagascar) (North Macedonia)	Dally Randriantefy; Biljana Trpeska	6; 1	6; 0
3	(Madagascar) (North Macedonia)	Dally Randriantefy / Faratiana Rasoarilalao; Biljana Trpeska / Zdenka Videnova	6; 4	6; 1

== Luxembourg vs. Liechtenstein ==
Luxembourg
3
Ali Bey Club, Manavgat, Turkey
10 May 1997
Red clay (outdoors)

Liechtenstein
0

			1	2	3
1	(Luxembourg) (Liechtenstein)	Alexandra Scholer; Fabienne Gmeiner	6; 1	6; 0
2	(Luxembourg) (Liechtenstein)	Rosabel Moyen; Jeannine Niedhardt	6; 1	6; 1
3	(Luxembourg) (Liechtenstein)	Alexandra Scholer / Fabienne Thill; Fabienne Gmeiner / Jeannine Niedhardt	6; 1	6; 0

== Botswana vs. Cyprus ==
Botswana
2
Ali Bey Club, Manavgat, Turkey
10 May 1997
Red clay (outdoors)

Cyprus
1

			1	2	3
1	(Botswana) (Cyprus)	Gaobolae Seleka; Elya Constanta	3; 6	6; 1	6; 4
2	(Botswana) (Cyprus)	Kelesitse Makgale; Daphne Nicolatou	3; 6	0; 6
3	(Botswana) (Cyprus)	Kelesitse Makgale / Gaobolae Seleka; Daphne Nicolatou / Eleni Pilava Papanikolaou	7^{7} 6^{2}	6; 4

== Madagascar vs. Botswana ==
Madagascar
3
Ali Bey Club, Manavgat, Turkey
11 May 1997
Red clay (outdoors)

Botswana
0

			1	2	3
1	(Madagascar) (Botswana)	Aina Rafolomanantsiatosika; Ninane Coyne	6; 1	6; 2
2	(Madagascar) (Botswana)	Dally Randriantefy; Onalenna Leepile	6; 0	6; 0
3	(Madagascar) (Botswana)	Aina Rafolomanantsiatosika / Faratiana Rasoarilalao; Kelesitse Makgale / Gaobolae Seleka	6; 3	6^{6} 7^{8}	3; 2	retired

== Malta vs. Macedonia ==
Malta
3
Ali Bey Club, Manavgat, Turkey
11 May 1997
Red clay (outdoors)

Macedonia
0

			1	2	3
1	(Malta) (North Macedonia)	Helen Asciak; Zdenka Videnova	7^{7} 6^{5}	7; 5
2	(Malta) (North Macedonia)	Lisa Camenzuli; Biljana Trpeska	6; 3	6; 2
3	(Malta) (North Macedonia)	Helen Asciak / Lisa Camenzuli; Biljana Trpeska / Zdenka Videnova				w/o

== Luxembourg vs. Cyprus ==
Luxembourg
3
Ali Bey Club, Manavgat, Turkey
11 May 1997
Red clay (outdoors)

Cyprus
0

			1	2	3
1	(Luxembourg) (Cyprus)	Fabienne Thill; Elya Constanta	6; 1	6; 0
2	(Luxembourg) (Cyprus)	Rosabel Moyen; Daphne Nicolatou	6; 0	6; 0
3	(Luxembourg) (Cyprus)	Alexandra Scholer / Fabienne Thill; Elya Constanta / Daphne Nicolatou				w/o

- Madagascar placed first in the pool, and thus advanced to Group I in 1998, where they placed fourth in their group of four and was thus relegated back to Group II for 1999.

== See also ==
- Fed Cup structure
