= 2014 Fed Cup Europe/Africa Zone Group III – Pool C =

International tennis competition

Group C of the 2014 Fed Cup Europe/Africa Zone Group III was one of four pools in the Europe/Africa Zone Group III of the 2014 Fed Cup. Three teams competed in a round robin competition, with the top team and the bottom two teams proceeding to their respective sections of the play-offs: the top team played for advancement to Group II.

== Standings ==
		(Denmark) DEN	(Norway) NOR	(Madagascar) MAD	RR; W–L	Set; W–L	Game; W–L	Standings
74	Denmark		2–1	3–0	5–1	10–3	74–36	1
82	Norway	1–2		2–1	3–3	6–7	49–68	2
86	Madagascar	0–3	1–2		1–5	4–10	48–67	3

== Round-robin ==
=== Denmark vs. Madagascar ===
Denmark
3
Tere Tennis Center, Tallinn, Estonia
5 February 2014
Hard (indoors)

Madagascar
0

			1	2	3
1	(Denmark) (Madagascar)	Mai Grage; Nantenaina Ramalalaharivololona	6; 2	6; 3
2	(Denmark) (Madagascar)	Karen Barbat; Sandra Andriamarosoa	2; 6	6; 1	6; 2
3	(Denmark) (Madagascar)	Karen Barbat / Mai Grage; Nantenaina Ramalalaharivololona / Océane Razakaboana	6; 1	6; 1

=== Norway vs. Madagascar ===
Norway
2
Tere Tennis Center, Tallinn, Estonia
6 February 2014
Hard (indoors)

Madagascar
1

			1	2	3
1	(Norway) (Madagascar)	Ida Seljevoll Skancke; Nantenaina Ramalalaharivololona	0; 6	2; 6
2	(Norway) (Madagascar)	Melanie Stokke; Sandra Andriamarosoa	6; 1	2; 6	7^{7} 6^{3}
3	(Norway) (Madagascar)	Ida Seljevoll Skancke / Melanie Stokke; Sandra Andriamarosoa / Nantenaina Ramalalaharivololona	6; 4	6; 3

=== Denmark vs. Norway ===
Denmark
2
Tere Tennis Center, Tallinn, Estonia
7 February 2014
Hard (indoors)

Norway
1

			1	2	3
1	(Denmark) (Norway)	Mai Grage; Ida Seljevoll Skancke	6; 1	6; 3
2	(Denmark) (Norway)	Karen Barbat; Melanie Stokke	6; 0	6; 2
3	(Denmark) (Norway)	Malou Ejdesgaard / Mai Grage; Ida Seljevoll Skancke / Melanie Stokke	6^{7} 7^{9}	6^{3} 7^{7}
