= 2013 Fed Cup Europe/Africa Zone Group III – Pool C =

Group C of the 2013 Fed Cup Europe/Africa Zone Group III was one of four pools in the Europe/Africa Zone Group III of the 2013 Fed Cup. Three teams competed in a round robin competition, with the top team and the bottom two teams proceeding to their respective sections of the play-offs: the top team played for advancement to Group II.

== Standings ==
		(Republic of Ireland) IRL	(Moldova) MDA	(Kenya) KEN	RR; W–L	Set; W–L	Game; W–L	Standings
76	Ireland		1–2	3–0	4–2	7–4	49–35	2
83	Moldova	2–1		3–0	5–1	10–3	68–38	1
92	Kenya	0–3	0–3		0–6	0–10	17–61	3

== Round-robin ==
=== Moldova vs. Kenya ===
Moldova
3
Terraten Club, Chișinău, Moldova
8 May 2013
Red clay (outdoors)

Kenya
0

			1	2	3
1	(Moldova) (Kenya)	Julia Helbet; Evelyn Otula	6; 1	6; 2
2	(Moldova) (Kenya)	Anastasia Vdovenco; Caroline Oduor	6; 1	6; 4
3	(Moldova) (Kenya)	Julia Helbet / Gabriela Porubin; Caroline Oduor / Evelyn Otula	6; 0	7; 5

=== Ireland vs. Kenya ===
Ireland
3
Terraten Club, Chișinău, Moldova
9 May 2013
Red clay (outdoors)

Kenya
0

			1	2	3
1	(Republic of Ireland) (Kenya)	Jenny Claffey; Caroline Oduor				w/o
2	(Republic of Ireland) (Kenya)	Sinéad Lohan; Shufaa Changawa Ruwa	6; 1	6; 0
3	(Republic of Ireland) (Kenya)	Jenny Claffey / Rachael Dillon; Caroline Oduor / Evelyn Otula	6; 0	6; 3

=== Ireland vs. Moldova ===
Ireland
1
Terraten Club, Chișinău, Moldova
10 May 2013
Red clay (outdoors)

Moldova
2

			1	2	3
1	(Republic of Ireland) (Moldova)	Jenny Claffey; Gabriela Porubin	2; 6	1; 6
2	(Republic of Ireland) (Moldova)	Sinéad Lohan; Anastasia Vdovenco	6; 3	6; 4
3	(Republic of Ireland) (Moldova)	Jenny Claffey / Rachael Dillon; Gabriela Porubin / Anastasia Vdovenco	6; 0	2; 6	2; 6

== See also ==
- Fed Cup structure
