= 2013 Fed Cup Europe/Africa Zone Group III – Pool D =

International tennis competition

Group D of the 2013 Fed Cup Europe/Africa Zone Group III was one of four pools in the Europe/Africa Zone Group III of the 2013 Fed Cup. Three teams competed in a round robin competition, with the top team and the bottom two teams proceeding to their respective sections of the play-offs: the top team played for advancement to Group II.

== Standings ==
		(Norway) NOR	(Liechtenstein) LIE	(Cyprus) CYP	(Madagascar) MAD	RR; W–L	Match; W–L	Set; W–L	Game; W–L	Standings
78	Norway		0–3	3–0	1–2	1–2	4–5	8–11	73–95	4
84	Liechtenstein	3–0		0–3	3–0	2–1	6–3	12–6	82–57	1
85	Cyprus	0–3	3–0		1–2	1–2	4–5	9–10	88–79	3
	Madagascar	2–1	0–3	2–1		2–1	4–5	8–10	72–81	2

== Round-robin ==
=== Norway vs. Cyprus ===
Norway
3
Terraten Club, Chișinău, Moldova
8 May 2013
Red clay (outdoors)

Cyprus
0

			1	2	3
1	(Norway) (Cyprus)	Melanie Stokke; Joanna-Nena Savva	6; 3	6; 3
2	(Norway) (Cyprus)	Hedda Ødegaard; Mara Argyriou	3; 6	6; 3	7; 5
3	(Norway) (Cyprus)	Hedda Ødegaard / Melanie Stokke; Maria Siopacha / Andria Tsaggaridou	7; 5	6; 4

=== Liechtenstein vs. Madagascar ===
Liechtenstein
3
Terraten Club, Chișinău, Moldova
8 May 2013
Red clay (outdoors)

Madagascar
0

			1	2	3
1	(Liechtenstein) (Madagascar)	Kathinka von Deichmann; Sandra Andriamarosoa	6; 1	6; 1
2	(Liechtenstein) (Madagascar)	Stephanie Vogt; Nantenaina Ramalalaharivololona	6; 0	6; 2
3	(Liechtenstein) (Madagascar)	Stephanie Vogt / Kathinka von Deichmann; Hariniony Andrimananarivo / Nantenaina Ramalalaharivololona	6; 3	6; 4

=== Norway vs. Liechtenstein ===
Norway
0
Terraten Club, Chișinău, Moldova
9 May 2013
Red clay (outdoors)

Liechtenstein
3

			1	2	3
1	(Norway) (Liechtenstein)	Melanie Stokke; Kathinka von Deichmann	3; 6	0; 6
2	(Norway) (Liechtenstein)	Hedda Ødegaard; Stephanie Vogt	1; 6	6^{3} 7^{7}
3	(Norway) (Liechtenstein)	Andrea Raaholt / Melanie Stokke; Stephanie Vogt / Kathinka von Deichmann	0; 6	0; 6

=== Cyprus vs. Madagascar ===
Cyprus
1
Terraten Club, Chișinău, Moldova
9 May 2013
Red clay (outdoors)

Madagascar
2

			1	2	3
1	(Cyprus) (Madagascar)	Joanna-Nena Savva; Sandra Andriamarosoa	3; 6	2; 6
2	(Cyprus) (Madagascar)	Mara Argyriou; Nantenaina Ramalalaharivololona	6; 3	6; 2
3	(Cyprus) (Madagascar)	Mara Argyriou / Maria Siopacha; Nantenaina Ramalalaharivololona / Zarah Razafimahatratra	3; 6	3; 6

=== Norway vs. Madagascar ===
Norway
1
Terraten Club, Chișinău, Moldova
10 May 2013
Red clay (outdoors)

Madagascar
2

			1	2	3
1	(Norway) (Madagascar)	Melanie Stokke; Sandra Andriamarosoa	6; 3	6; 4
2	(Norway) (Madagascar)	Hedda Ødegaard; Zarah Razafimahatratra	3; 6	1; 6
3	(Norway) (Madagascar)	Hedda Ødegaard / Melanie Stokke; Hariniony Andrimananarivo / Zarah Razafimahatratra	5; 7	1; 6

=== Liechtenstein vs. Cyprus ===
Liechtenstein
0
Terraten Club, Chișinău, Moldova
10 May 2013
Red clay (outdoors)

Cyprus
3

			1	2	3
1	(Liechtenstein) (Cyprus)	Sandra Hinterberger; Andria Tsaggaridou	2; 6	1; 6
2	(Liechtenstein) (Cyprus)	Lynn Zünd; Mara Argyriou	1; 6	3; 6
3	(Liechtenstein) (Cyprus)	Sandra Hinterberger / Lynn Zünd; Mara Argyriou / Maria Siopacha	1; 6	1; 6

== See also ==
- Fed Cup structure
