= Despoina Vogasari =

Greek professional tennis player (born 1995)

- Country (sports): Greece
- Born: 9 July 1995 (age 29); Athens, Greece
- Height: 5 ft 6 in (168 cm)
- Plays: Right-handed
- Prize money: $17,151

Singles
- Career record: 56–43
- Career titles: 3 ITF
- Highest ranking: No. 508 (15 July 2013)

Doubles
- Career record: 31–25
- Career titles: 1 ITF
- Highest ranking: No. 645 (22 July 2013)

Despoina "Debbie" Vogasari (Δέσποινα Βογάσαρη, born 9 July 1995) is a Greek former professional tennis player.

Born in Athens, Vogasari featured as a doubles player in four Fed Cup ties for Greece as a 17-year old in 2013, partnering Despina Papamichail. She had a career high singles ranking of 508 in the world and won three titles on the ITF Women's Circuit.

Educated in the United States, Vogasari played three seasons of collegiate tennis for the University of Houston, before transferring to the University of Kansas for her final year of eligibility. While at Houston in 2015, she was named the women's American Athletic Conference (ACC) Player of the Year.

== ITF finals ==
=== Singles: 3–3 ===
Result	No.	Date	Tournament	Surface	Opponent	Score
Loss	1.	29 May 2011	ITF Paros, Greece	Carpet	(Denmark) Karen Barritza	1–6, 5–7
Loss	2.	27 May 2012	ITF Ra'anana, Israel	Hard	(Israel) Ofri Lankri	0–6, 1–6
Win	1.	14 October 2012	ITF Mytilini, Greece	Hard	(Poland) Sylwia Zagórska	6–1, 2–6, 6–4
Loss	3.	26 May 2013	ITF Athens, Greece	Hard	(Chinese Taipei) Lee Pei-chi	2–6, 3–6
Win	2.	30 June 2013	ITF Sharm El Sheikh, Egypt	Hard	(South Africa) Madrie Le Roux	6–4, 6–4
Win	3.	20 July 2014	ITF Sharm El Sheikh, Egypt	Hard	(Ukraine) Valeriya Strakhova	7–5, 6–0

=== Doubles: 1–5 ===
Result	No.	Date	Tournament	Surface	Partner	Opponents	Score
Loss	1.	8 April 2012	ITF Heraklion, Greece	Carpet	(North Macedonia) Lina Gjorcheska	(Czech Republic) Martina Borecká (Czech Republic) Petra Krejsová	0–6, 0–6
Loss	2.	15 April 2012	ITF Heraklion, Greece	Carpet	(North Macedonia) Lina Gjorcheska	(Czech Republic) Martina Borecká (Czech Republic) Petra Krejsová	2–6, 3–6
Loss	3.	4 November 2012	ITF Heraklion, Greece	Hard	(Greece) Despina Papamichail	(France) Manon Arcangioli (France) Laëtitia Sarrazin	4–6, 4–6
Win	1.	19 May 2013	ITF Marathon, Greece	Hard	(North Macedonia) Lina Gjorcheska	(Estonia) Anett Kontaveit (United Kingdom) Laura Deigman	6–4, 2–6, [10–6]
Loss	4.	26 May 2013	ITF Athens, Greece	Hard	(Greece) Eleni Kordolaimi	(Belarus) Sviatlana Pirazhenka (Netherlands) Gabriela van de Graaf	6–1, 5–7, [7–10]
Loss	5.	6 July 2014	ITF Sharm El Sheikh, Egypt	Hard	(Greece) Eleni Kordolaimi	(United States) Jan Abaza (Egypt) Ola Abou Zekry	4–6, 6–3, [7–10]
