= Lynn Kiro =

South African tennis player (born 1995)

- Full name: Lynn Marie-Joe Kyro
- Country (sports): South Africa
- Born: 6 August 1995 (age 29); Cape Town, South Africa
- Plays: Right (two-handed backhand)
- College: Texas Tech University
- Prize money: $4,941

Singles
- Career record: 26–16
- Career titles: 0
- Highest ranking: No. 840 (5 August 2013)

Doubles
- Career record: 16–7
- Career titles: 0 WTA, 2 ITF
- Highest ranking: No. 744 (29 July 2013)

Team competitions
- Fed Cup: 1–2

Lynn Kiro (born 6 August 1995) is a South African tennis coach and former player.

On the ITF Junior Circuit, she achieved her highest ranking of world No. 60 in March 2013. In April 2013, she was South Africa's number-two-ranked female junior tennis player, behind Ilze Hattingh.

On the pro circuit, Kyro reached two $10k doubles finals alongside Malagasy Zarah Razafimahatratra, winning one and losing one. Her highest singles ranking is 840 while her highest in doubles is 744. In 2012, Kyro made her debut for the South Africa Fed Cup team, for which she played doubles.

Kiro attended Texas Tech University from 2013–2017 and had a decorated collegiate tennis career. She is currently head coach of women’s tennis at Wagner College.

== ITF Circuit finals ==
=== Doubles (3–1) ===
Legend $25,000 tournaments $10,000 tournaments	Finals by surface Hard (3–1) Clay (0–0)

Result	No.	Date	Tournament	Surface	Partner	Opponents	Score
Loss	1.	Dec 2012	Potchefstroom, South Africa	Hard	(Madagascar) Zarah Razafimahatratra	(Germany) Kim-Alice Grajdek (Israel) Keren Shlomo	6–2, 4–6, [8–10]
Win	1.	Dec 2012	Potchefstroom, South Africa	Hard	(Madagascar) Zarah Razafimahatratra	(Germany) Kim-Alice Grajdek (Israel) Keren Shlomo	w/o
Win	2.	Jul 2013	Sharm El Sheikh, Egypt	Hard	(Egypt) Mayar Sherif	(Russia) Alina Mikheeva (Russia) Anna Morgina	6–3, 6–2
Win	3.	Aug 2015	Austin, United States	Hard	(United States) Sarah Dvorak	(United States) Chloe Michele Ouellet-Pizer (United States) Gabrielle Smith	6–3, 6–2

== Fed Cup participation ==
=== Doubles (1–1) ===
Edition	Round	Date	Location	Partner	Against	Surface	Opponent	W/L	Score
2012 Fed Cup	Europe/Africa Zone; Group II – Play-offs	20 April 2012	Cairo, Egypt	Montenegro	Clay	(South Africa) Madrie Le Roux	(Montenegro) Vladica Babić (Montenegro) Milica Šljukić	W	6–1, 6–2
2012 Fed Cup	Europe/Africa Zone; Group II – Play-offs	21 April 2012	Cairo, Egypt	Turkey	Clay	(South Africa) Madrie Le Roux	(Turkey) Pemra Özgen (Turkey) Melis Sezer	L	4–6, 2–6
