= 2013 Fed Cup Europe/Africa Zone Group III – Pool A =

Group A of the 2013 Fed Cup Europe/Africa Zone Group III was one of four pools in the Europe/Africa Zone Group III of the 2013 Fed Cup. Three teams competed in a round robin competition, with the top team and the bottom two teams proceeding to their respective sections of the play-offs: the top team played for advancement to Group II.

== Standings ==
		(Egypt) EGY	(Armenia) ARM	(Malta) MLT	RR; W–L	Set; W–L	Game; W–L	Standings
69	Egypt		3–0	3–0	6–0	12–1	75–33	1
81	Armenia	0–3		1–2	1–5	3–10	40–63	3
87	Malta	0–3	2–1		2–4	5–9	46–65	2

== Round-robin ==
=== Egypt vs. Armenia ===
Egypt
3
Terraten Club, Chișinău, Moldova
8 May 2013
Red clay (outdoors)

Armenia
0

			1	2	3
1	(Egypt) (Armenia)	Sandra Samir; Ofelya Poghosyan	6; 2	6; 4
2	(Egypt) (Armenia)	Magy Aziz; Anna Movsisyan	6; 2	6; 2
3	(Egypt) (Armenia)	Magy Aziz / Mora Eshak; Nune Khachatryan / Ofelya Poghosyan	6; 2	6; 2

=== Armenia vs. Malta ===
Armenia
1
Terraten Club, Chișinău, Moldova
9 May 2013
Red clay (outdoors)

Malta
2

			1	2	3
1	(Armenia) (Malta)	Anna Movsisyan; Rosanne Dimech	6; 0	6; 1
2	(Armenia) (Malta)	Nune Khachatryan; Elaine Genovese	2; 6	1; 6
3	(Armenia) (Malta)	Anna Movsisyan / Ofelya Poghosyan; Rosanne Dimech / Elaine Genovese	2; 6	6; 2	3; 6

=== Egypt vs. Malta ===
Egypt
3
Terraten Club, Chișinău, Moldova
10 May 2013
Red clay (outdoors)

Malta
0

			1	2	3
1	(Egypt) (Malta)	Sandra Samir; Esther Muscat	6; 0	6; 1
2	(Egypt) (Malta)	Magy Aziz; Elaine Genovese	6; 4	6; 2
3	(Egypt) (Malta)	Magy Aziz / Mora Eshak; Rosanne Dimech / Elaine Genovese	6; 4	3; 6	6; 2

== See also ==
- Fed Cup structure
