= Madagascar Billie Jean King Cup team =

National tennis team

Madagascar
- Captain: Soloniaina Rakotomaniraka
- Nations Ranking: 109 (13 November 2023)
- Colors: red & white
- First year: 1997
- Years played: 9
- Ties played (W–L): 39 (20–19)
- Best finish: Zonal Group I RR
- Most total wins: Aina Rafolomanantsiatosika (10–13)
- Most singles wins: Dally Randriantefy (6-0); Natacha Randriantefy (6–2)
- Most doubles wins: Aina Rafolomanantsiatosika (5–7)
- Best doubles team: Aina Rafolomanantsiatosika; Mirina Rajaoarisoa (2–3)
- Most ties played: Aina Rafolomanantsiatosika (15)
- Most years played: Aina Rafolomanantsiatosika (4)

The Madagascar Billie Jean King Cup team represents Madagascar in the Billie Jean King Cup tennis competition and are governed by the Fédération Malgache de Tennis. They currently compete in the Africa Zone of Group III.

They last competed in 2023, which was 6 years since their last appearance, and were promoted in the same year to Africa Group III for 2024.

== History ==
Madagascar competed in its first Fed Cup in 1997. The team was absent from the Billie Jean King Cup for six years until their return in 2023, only losing one match. In the same year, they defeated Tanzania in the play-offs for their promotion to Africa Group III.

Their best result was winning Group II in their debut year.

== Current team ==
Rankings as of November 6, 2023

Players representing Madagascar in 2023
Name	Born	First	Last		Ties	Win/Loss			Ranks	
Name	Born	First	Year	Tie	Ties	Sin	Dou	Tot	Sin	Dou
Mialy Ranaivo	July 14, 2003	2023	2023	Tanzania	6	4-0	2-0	6-0	—N/a	—N/a
Narindra Corrine Ranaivo	July 14, 2003	2023	2023	Tanzania	6	2-0	4-0	6-0	—N/a	—N/a
Harena Voaviandraina	October 16, 2006	2023	2023	Tanzania	6	2-0	4-0	6-0	—N/a	—N/a
Andraina Mitia Voavy	April 5, 2008	2023	2023	Tanzania	6	3-1	2-0	5-1	—N/a	—N/a

== Results ==
Here is the list of all match-ups since 1995, when the competition started being held in the current World Group format.

Year	Competition	Date	Surface	Location	Opponent	Score	Result
1997	Europe/Africa Zone; Group II, Pool D	5 May	Clay	Manavgat; Turkey	Malta	2–1	Won
1997	Europe/Africa Zone; Group II, Pool D	6 May	Clay	Manavgat; Turkey	Cyprus	0–3	Won
1997	Europe/Africa Zone; Group II, Pool D	8 May	Clay	Manavgat; Turkey	Liechtenstein	0–3	Won
1997	Europe/Africa Zone; Group II, Pool D	9 May	Clay	Manavgat; Turkey	Luxembourg	1–2	Won
1997	Europe/Africa Zone; Group II, Pool D	10 May	Clay	Manavgat; Turkey	North Macedonia	3–0	Won
1997	Europe/Africa Zone; Group II, Pool D	11 May	Clay	Manavgat; Turkey	Botswana	0–3	Won
1998	Europe/Africa Zone; Group I, Pool B	14 April	Clay	Murcia; Spain	Poland	0–3	Lost
1998	Europe/Africa Zone; Group I, Pool B	15 April	Clay	Murcia; Spain	Portugal	1–2	Lost
1998	Europe/Africa Zone; Group I, Pool B	16 April	Clay	Murcia; Spain	Great Britain	0–3	Lost
1999	Europe/Africa Zone; Group II, Pool A	26 April	Clay	Murcia; Spain	Egypt	1–2	Won
1999	Europe/Africa Zone; Group II, Pool A	27 April	Clay	Murcia; Spain	Hungary	3–0	Lost
1999	Europe/Africa Zone; Group II, Pool A	28 April	Clay	Murcia; Spain	Bosnia and Herzegovina	3–0	Lost
1999	Europe/Africa Zone; Group II, Pool A	29 April	Clay	Murcia; Spain	Botswana	1–2	Won
2000	Europe/Africa Zone; Group II, Pool D	28 March	Clay	Estoril; Portugal	Algeria	2–1	Lost
2000	Europe/Africa Zone; Group II, Pool D	29 March	Clay	Estoril; Portugal	Portugal	3–0	Lost
2000	Europe/Africa Zone; Group II, Pool D	30 March	Clay	Estoril; Portugal	Lesotho	1–2	Won
2000	Europe/Africa Zone; Group II, Pool D	31 March	Clay	Estoril; Portugal	Estonia	3–0	Lost
2000	Europe/Africa Zone; Group II, Pool D	1 April	Clay	Estoril; Portugal	Moldova	0–1	Lost
2013	Europe/Africa Zone; Group III, Pool D	8 May	Clay	Chișinău; Moldova	Liechtenstein	3–0	Lost
2013	Europe/Africa Zone; Group III, Pool D	9 May	Clay	Chișinău; Moldova	Cyprus	1–2	Won
2013	Europe/Africa Zone; Group III, Pool D	10 May	Clay	Chișinău; Moldova	Norway	1–2	Won
2013	Europe/Africa Zone; Group III Play-Offs	11 May	Clay	Chișinău; Moldova	Morocco	1–1	Draw
2014	Europe/Africa Zone; Group III, Pool C	5 February	Hard (i)	Tallinn; Estonia	Denmark	3–0	Lost
2014	Europe/Africa Zone; Group III, Pool C	6 February	Hard (i)	Tallinn; Estonia	Norway	2–1	Lost
2014	Europe/Africa Zone; Group III Play-Offs	8 February	Hard (i)	Tallinn; Estonia	Armenia	1–2	Won
2016	Europe/Africa Zone; Group III, Pool C	11 April	Clay	Ulcinj; Montenegro	Moldova	2–1	Won
2016	Europe/Africa Zone; Group III, Pool C	12 April	Clay	Ulcinj; Montenegro	Cyprus	1–2	Won
2016	Europe/Africa Zone; Group III, Pool C	14 April	Clay	Ulcinj; Montenegro	Tunisia	0–3	Lost
2016	Europe/Africa Zone; Group III Play-Offs	15 April	Clay	Ulcinj; Montenegro	Greece	0–2	Lost
2018	Europe/Africa Zone; Group III, Pool B	16 April	Hard	Tunis; Tunisia	Kosovo	1–2	Lost
2018	Europe/Africa Zone; Group III, Pool B	17 April	Hard	Tunis; Tunisia	Cyprus	1–2	Lost
2018	Europe/Africa Zone; Group III, Pool B	18 April	Hard	Tunis; Tunisia	Tunisia	0–3	Lost
2018	Europe/Africa Zone; Group III, Pool B	19 April	Hard	Tunis; Tunisia	Algeria	1–2	Lost
2023	Europe/Africa Zone; Group IV Africa, Pool B	5 June	Clay	Kigali; Rwanda	Cameroon	2–1	Won
2023	Europe/Africa Zone; Group IV Africa, Pool B	6 June	Clay	Kigali; Rwanda	Lesotho	3–0	Won
2023	Europe/Africa Zone; Group IV Africa, Pool B	7 June	Clay	Kigali; Rwanda	Senegal	3–0	Won
2023	Europe/Africa Zone; Group IV Africa, Pool B	8 June	Clay	Kigali; Rwanda	Congo	3–0	Won
2023	Europe/Africa Zone; Group IV Africa, Pool B	9 June	Clay	Kigali; Rwanda	DR Congo	3–0	Won
2023	Europe/Africa Zone; Group IV Africa Play-Offs	10 June	Clay	Kigali; Rwanda	Tanzania	3–0	Won

== See also ==
- Billie Jean King Cup
- Madagascar Davis Cup team
