= Joana Eidukonytė =

Lithuanian tennis player (born 1994)

- Country (sports): Lithuania
- Born: 2 October 1994 (age 30); Vilnius
- Height: 1.72 m (5 ft 8 in)
- Prize money: $12,639

Singles
- Career record: 57–45
- Career titles: 1 ITF
- Highest ranking: No. 605 (11 July 2016)

Doubles
- Career record: 19–25
- Career titles: 0
- Highest ranking: No. 607 (1 July 2019)

Team competitions
- Fed Cup: 17–13

Joana Eidukonytė (born 2 October 1994) is a Lithuanian former tennis player.

Eidukonytė has won one singles title on the ITF Women's Circuit. On 11 July 2016, she reached her career-high singles ranking of world No. 605. On 1 July 2019, she peaked at No. 607 in the doubles rankings.

Playing for Lithuania in Fed Cup competition, Eidukonytė has a 17–13 record.

== ITF finals ==
=== Singles (1–0) ===
Result	No.	Date	Tournament	Surface	Opponent	Score
Win	1.	2 August 2015	ITF Pärnu, Estonia	Clay	(Netherlands) Eva Wacanno	6–2, 6–3

=== Doubles (0–2) ===
Legend $15,000 tournaments $10,000 tournaments	Finals by surface Hard (0–0) Clay (0–2)

Outcome	No.	Date	Tournament	Surface	Partner	Opponents	Score
Runner-up	1.	1 August 2015	ITF Pärnu, Estonia	Clay	(United Kingdom) Helen Parish	(Norway) Emma Flood (Netherlands) Eva Wacanno	4–6, 2–6
Runner-up	2.	19 May 2018	ITF Gothenburg, Sweden	Clay	(Poland) Daria Kuczer	(United Kingdom) Anna Popescu (Sweden) Marina Yudanov	4–6, 2–6
