= Ella Leivo =

Finnish tennis player

- Full name: Ella Leivo
- Country (sports): Finland
- Born: 26 July 1994 (age 30); Tampere, Finland
- Height: 1.79 m (5 ft 10 in)
- Prize money: $11,128

Singles
- Career record: 31–66
- Career titles: 0
- Highest ranking: 1044 (28 July 2014)

Doubles
- Career record: 31–57
- Career titles: 0
- Highest ranking: 788 (11 November 2013)

Team competitions
- Fed Cup: 4–11

Ella Leivo (born 26 July 1994 in Tampere) is a Finnish tennis player.

On 28 July 2014, Leivo reached her best singles ranking of world number 1044. On 11 November 2013, she peaked at world number 788 in the doubles rankings.

Leivo has a 4–11 record for Finland in Fed Cup competition.

== ITF finals (0–3) ==
=== Doubles (0–3) ===
Legend $100,000 tournaments $75,000 tournaments $50,000 tournaments $25,000 tournaments $15,000 tournaments $10,000 tournaments	Finals by surface Hard (0–2) Clay (0–1) Grass (0–0) Carpet (0–0)

Result	No.	Date	Category	Tournament	Surface	Partner	Opponents	Score
Runner-up	1.	9 April 2012	$10,000	Tlemcen, Algeria	Clay	(Finland) Johanna Hyöty	(Russia) Alexandra Romanova (Germany) Alina Wessel	5–7, 7–5, [10–12]
Runner-up	2.	1 June 2015	$10,000	Sharm el-Sheikh, Egypt	Hard	(United Kingdom) Grace Dixon	(Italy) Alice Matteucci (Greece) Despina Papamichail	1–6, 3–6
Runner-up	3.	31 August 2015	$10,000	Sharm el-Sheikh, Egypt	Hard	(Finland) Roosa Timonen	(Russia) Yulia Bryzgalova (India) Kanika Vaidya	6–7^{(4–7)}, 4–6
