= Danica Krstajić =

Montenegrin tennis player

- Country (sports): Serbia and Montenegro (2003–2006); Montenegro (2006–2012)
- Born: 1 March 1987 (age 38)
- Turned pro: 2003
- Retired: 2012
- Plays: Right-handed (two-handed backhand)
- Prize money: $61,665

Singles
- Career record: 146–86
- Career titles: 6 ITF
- Highest ranking: No. 223 (8 October 2007)

Doubles
- Career record: 73–52
- Career titles: 6 ITF
- Highest ranking: No. 162 (30 July 2007)

Team competitions
- Fed Cup: 19–5

Danica Krstajić (born 1 March 1987) is a Montenegrin former professional tennis player.

She started her tennis career on 10 August 2003, playing for Serbia and Montenegro; and from June 2006 on, she was playing for Montenegro.

Her career-high rankings include No. 223 in singles (October 2007) and No. 162 in doubles (July 2007). She won six ITF tournaments in both singles and doubles. She tried to qualify for a couple of WTA Tour tournaments: in 2005 in Luxembourg and in Hasselt, in 2006 in Warsaw and Linz, and in 2007 again in Linz.

== ITF Circuit finals ==
$100,000 tournaments
$75,000 tournaments
$50,000 tournaments
$25,000 tournaments
$10,000 tournaments

=== Singles (6–2) ===
Outcome	No.	Date	Tournament	Surface	Opponent	Score
Runner-up	1.	10 August 2003	Rebecq, Belgium	Clay	(Australia) Nicole Kriz	6–3, 0–6, 1–6
Winner	1.	9 May 2004	Warsaw, Poland	Clay	(Czech Republic) Tereza Veverková	0–6, 7–5, 6–2
Runner-up	2.	20 June 2004	Podgorica, Serbia and Montenegro	Clay	(Germany) Andrea Petkovic	1–6, 3–6
Winner	2.	19 June 2005	Lenzerheide, Switzerland	Clay	(Italy) Karin Knapp	6–2, 7–5
Winner	3.	24 July 2005	Düsseldorf, Germany	Clay	(Germany) Franziska Etzel	6–2, 7–6^{(7–4)}
Winner	4.	10 September 2006	Düsseldorf, Germany	Clay	(Germany) Imke Kusgen	6–0, 1–6, 6–2
Winner	5.	4 March 2007	Buchen, Germany	Carpet (i)	(Czech Republic) Nikola Fraňková	6–3, 3–6, 7–6
Winner	6.	13 September 2007	Sofia, Bulgaria	Clay	(Romania) Magda Mihalache	3–6, 6–2, 6–2

=== Doubles (6–4) ===
Outcome	No.	Date	Tournament	Surface	Partner	Opponents	Score
Runner-up	1.	24 July 2005	Düsseldorf, Germany	Clay	(Russia) Elena Chalova	(Poland) Olga Brózda (Poland) Monika Schneider	6–1, 1–6, 2–6
Winner	1.	11 September 2005	Durmersheim, Germany	Clay	(Russia) Elena Chalova	(Germany) Adriana Barna (Germany) Caroline Schneider	4–6, 6–4, 6–4
Winner	2.	4 June 2006	Galatina, Italy	Clay	(Czech Republic) Renata Voráčová	(Hungary) Kyra Nagy (Italy) Valentina Sassi	6–4, 6–0
Winner	3.	3 September 2006	Alphen aan den Rijn, Netherlands	Clay	(Slovenia) Andreja Klepač	(Belgium) Leslie Butkiewicz (Belgium) Caroline Maes	6–2, 7–6^{(7–1)}
Runner-up	2.	17 September 2006	Sofia, Bulgaria	Clay	(Slovenia) Maša Zec Peškirič	(Croatia) Matea Mezak (Croatia) Nika Ožegović	4–6, 3–6
Winner	4.	18 February 2007	Stockholm, Sweden	Hard (i)	(Russia) Olga Panova	(Romania) Sorana Cîrstea (United Kingdom) Melanie South	6–2, 0–6, 6–2
Runner-up	3.	9 June 2007	Zagreb, Croatia	Clay	(Serbia) Teodora Mirčić	(Serbia) Karolina Jovanović (Russia) Anastasia Poltoratskaya	6–0, 4–6, 1–6
Winner	5.	9 September 2007	Düsseldorf, Germany	Clay	(Germany) Franziska Etzel	(Germany) Linda Berlinecke (Germany) Katrin Schmidt	6–1, 6–2
Winner	6.	30 September 2007	Podgorica, Montenegro	Clay	(Bosnia and Herzegovina) Sandra Martinović	(Croatia) Ivana Abramović (Croatia) Maria Abramović	6–1, 6–2
Runner-up	4.	11 September 2011	Podgorica, Montenegro	Clay	(Montenegro) Danka Kovinić	(Italy) Corinna Dentoni (Argentina) Florencia Molinero	4–6, 7–5, [5–10]
