= Montenegro Billie Jean King Cup team =

Montenegro
- Captain: Ivan Nikolić
- Nations Ranking: 72 ▲3 (08 February 2016)
- Highest ranking: 64 (23 Apr 2012)
- Lowest ranking: 88 (18 Apr 2011)
- Colors: Red & Yellow
- First year: 2007
- Years played: 8
- Ties played (W–L): 32 (12-17)
- Most total wins: Danka Kovinić (16-4)
- Most singles wins: Danka Kovinić (8-3)
- Most doubles wins: Danica Krstajić (8-3), Danka Kovinić (8-1)
- Best doubles team: Danica Krstajić / Danka Kovinić (7-1)
- Most ties played: Danica Krstajić (14)
- Most years played: Danica Krstajić, Danka Kovinić (4)

The Montenegro Billie Jean King Cup team represents Montenegro in the Billie Jean King Cup tennis competition and are governed by the Tennis Federation of Montenegro. They currently compete in the Europe Zone of Group III.

== History ==
Montenegro competed in its first Fed Cup in 2007, finishing third in their Group III pool.

Montenegrin players played for Serbia and Montenegro from 2004 to 2006 and for Yugoslavia prior to that.

Montenegro obtained its first promotion from Group III to Group II in 2011 with a win over Tunisia in Promotional Play-Off.

== Current team ==
- Danka Kovinić
- Ana Veselinović
- Anja Drašković
- Edisa Hot

== Matches ==
Full list of Montenegrin women's Fed Cup team matches (since independence):

No.	Year	Opponent	Final score
1	2007	Malta	3:0
2	2007	Latvia	0:3
3	2007	Moldova	3:0
4	2007	Ireland	1:2
5	2008	Moldova	2:1
6	2008	Finland	1:2
7	2008	Armenia	1:2
8	2008	Morocco	0:3
9	2008	Egypt	1:2

Note: Montenegro scores first

== See also ==
- Billie Jean King Cup
- Montenegro Davis Cup team
