= 2015 Fed Cup Europe/Africa Zone Group III – play-offs =

International tennis competition play-offs

The play-offs of the 2015 Fed Cup Europe/Africa Zone Group III were the final stages of the Group III zonal competition involving teams from Europe and Africa. Using the positions determined in their pools, the thirteen teams faced off to determine their placing in the 2015 Fed Cup Europe/Africa Zone Group III. The top two teams advanced to Fed Cup Europe/Africa Zone Group II.

Placing	Pool A	Pool B	Pool C	Pool D
1	Lithuania	Greece	Denmark	Moldova
2	Cyprus	Armenia	Norway	Macedonia
3	Iceland	Montenegro	Algeria	Namibia
4	N/A	N/A	N/A	Mozambique

== Promotional play-offs ==
The first placed teams of each pool were drawn in head-to-head rounds. The winner of each round advanced to Group II in 2016.

=== Lithuania vs. Moldova ===
Lithuania
2
Bellevue, Ulcinj, Montenegro
18 April 2014
Clay

Moldova
1

			1	2	3
1	(Lithuania) (Moldova)	Akvilė Paražinskaitė; Alexandra Perper	7; 5	6; 2
2	(Lithuania) (Moldova)	Lina Stančiūtė; Daniela Ciobanu	1; 6	4; 6
3	(Lithuania) (Moldova)	Akvilė Paražinskaitė / Lina Stančiūtė; Julia Helbet / Alexandra Perper	6; 4	6; 4

=== Greece vs. Denmark ===
Greece
0
Bellevue, Ulcinj, Montenegro
18 April 2014
Clay

Denmark
2

			1	2	3
1	(Greece) (Denmark)	Despina Papamichail; Karen Barbat	5; 7	6; 3	6^{4} 7^{7}
2	(Greece) (Denmark)	Maria Sakkari; Caroline Wozniacki	3; 6	0; 6
3	(Greece) (Denmark)	Eleni Daniilidou / Valentini Grammatikopoulou; Mai Grage / Caroline Wozniacki				not played

== 5th to 8th play-offs ==
The second placed teams of each pool were drawn in head-to-head rounds to find the equal fifth and seventh placed teams.

=== Armenia vs. Norway ===
Armenia
0
Bellevue, Ulcinj, Montenegro
17 April 2014
Clay

Norway
3

			1	2	3
1	(Armenia) (Norway)	Lusine Chobanyan; Caroline Rohde-Moe	0; 6	0; 6
2	(Armenia) (Norway)	Ani Amiraghyan; Melanie Stokke	1; 6	0; 6
3	(Armenia) (Norway)	Ani Amiraghyan / Milena Avetisyan; Caroline Rohde-Moe / Melanie Stokke	2; 6	3; 6

=== Cyprus vs. Macedonia ===
Cyprus
1
Bellevue, Ulcinj, Montenegro
18 April 2014
Clay

Macedonia
2

			1	2	3
1	(Cyprus) (North Macedonia)	Maria Siopacha; Magdalena Stoilkovska	7; 5	6; 2
2	(Cyprus) (North Macedonia)	Eliza Omirou; Lina Gjorcheska	2; 6	0; 6
3	(Cyprus) (North Macedonia)	Eliza Omirou / Maria Siopacha; Lina Gjorcheska / Magdalena Stoilkovska	5; 7	4; 6

== 9th to 12th play-offs ==
The third placed teams of each pool were drawn in head-to-head rounds to find the equal ninth and eleventh placed teams.

=== Iceland vs. Namibia ===
Iceland
0
Bellevue, Ulcinj, Montenegro
17 April 2014
Clay

Namibia
3

			1	2	3
1	(Iceland) (Namibia)	Anna Soffia Grönholm; Liniques Theron	1; 6	4; 6
2	(Iceland) (Namibia)	Hjördís Rósa Guðmundsdóttir; Lesedi Sheya Jacobs	1; 6	1; 6
3	(Iceland) (Namibia)	Hera Brynjarsdóttir / Anna Soffia Grönholm; Lize-Elfrida Moolman / Liniques Theron	1; 6	0; 6

=== Montenegro vs. Algeria ===
Montenegro
0
Bellevue, Ulcinj, Montenegro
17 April 2014
Clay

Algeria
3

			1	2	3
1	(Montenegro) (Algeria)	Nina Kalezić; Amira Benaissa	7; 5	5; 7	1; 6
2	(Montenegro) (Algeria)	Kristina Samardžić; Inès Ibbou	0; 6	1; 6
3	(Montenegro) (Algeria)	Nikoleta Bulatović / Kristina Samardžić; Amira Benaissa / Inès Ibbou	4; 6	2; 6

== Final placements ==
Placing	Teams	
Promoted	Lithuania	Denmark
Third	Moldova	Greece
Fifth	Norway	Macedonia
Seventh	Armenia	Cyprus
Ninth	Namibia	Algeria
Eleventh	Iceland	Montenegro
Thirteenth	Mozambique	

- Lithuania and Denmark advanced to Europe/Africa Group II in 2016.
