= 2014 Fed Cup Europe/Africa Zone Group III – play-offs =

International tennis competition play-offs

The play-offs of the 2014 Fed Cup Europe/Africa Zone Group III were the final stages of the Group III zonal competition involving teams from Europe and Africa. Using the positions determined in their pools, the twelve teams faced off to determine their placing in the 2014 Fed Cup Europe/Africa Zone Group III. The top two teams advanced to Fed Cup Europe/Africa Zone Group II.

| Placing | Pool A | Pool B | Pool C | Pool D |
|---|---|---|---|---|
| 1 | Estonia | Greece | Denmark | Ireland |
| 2 | Namibia | Moldova | Norway | Malta |
| 3 | Armenia | Cyprus | Madagascar | Iceland |

== Promotional play-offs ==
The first placed teams of each pool were drawn in head-to-head rounds. The winner of each round advanced to Group II in 2014.

=== Estonia vs. Denmark ===
Estonia
2
Tere Tennis Center, Tallinn, Estonia
8 February 2014
Hard (indoors)

Denmark
0

| | | | 1 | 2 | 3 |
|---|---|---|---|---|---|---|
| 1 | (Estonia) (Denmark) | Anett Kontaveit; Mai Grage | 6; 0 | 6; 0 |
| 2 | (Estonia) (Denmark) | Kaia Kanepi; Karen Barbat | 6; 2 | 6; 1 |
| 3 | (Estonia) (Denmark) | Eva Paalma / Tatjana Vorobjova; Karen Barbat / Mai Grage | | | | not played |

=== Greece vs. Ireland ===
Greece
1
Tere Tennis Center, Tallinn, Estonia
8 February 2014
Hard (indoors)

Ireland
2

| | | | 1 | 2 | 3 |
|---|---|---|---|---|---|
| 1 | (Greece) (Republic of Ireland) | Valentini Grammatikopoulou; Jane Fennelly | 6; 2 | 6; 0 |
| 2 | (Greece) (Republic of Ireland) | Maria Sakkari; Amy Bowtell | 6; 4 | 3; 6 | 2; 6 |
| 3 | (Greece) (Republic of Ireland) | Valentini Grammatikopoulou / Maria Sakkari; Amy Bowtell / Rachael Dillon | 4; 6 | 3; 6 |

== 5th to 8th play-offs ==
The second placed teams of each pool were drawn in head-to-head rounds to find the equal fifth and seventh placed teams.

=== Namibia vs. Norway ===
Namibia
0
Tere Tennis Center, Tallinn, Estonia
8 February 2014
Hard (indoors)

Norway
3

| | | | 1 | 2 | 3 |
|---|---|---|---|---|---|
| 1 | (Namibia) (Norway) | Kerstin Gressmann; Ida Seljevoll Skancke | 1; 6 | 1; 6 |
| 2 | (Namibia) (Norway) | Lesedi Sheya Jacobs; Melanie Stokke | 2; 6 | 1; 6 |
| 3 | (Namibia) (Norway) | Lesedi Sheya Jacobs / Liniques Theron; Ida Seljevoll Skancke / Melanie Stokke | 2; 6 | 3; 6 |

=== Moldova vs. Malta ===
Moldova
3
Tere Tennis Center, Tallinn, Estonia
8 February 2014
Hard (indoors)

Malta
0

| | | | 1 | 2 | 3 |
|---|---|---|---|---|---|
| 1 | (Moldova) (Malta) | Anastasia Dețiuc; Elaine Genovese | 2; 6 | 6; 1 | 6; 1 |
| 2 | (Moldova) (Malta) | Gabriela Porubin; Katrina Sammut | 6; 2 | 6; 2 |
| 3 | (Moldova) (Malta) | Julia Helbet / Gabriela Porubin; Rosanne Dimech / Elaine Genovese | 6; 3 | 6; 2 |

== 9th to 12th play-offs ==
The third placed teams of each pool were drawn in head-to-head rounds to find the equal ninth and eleventh placed teams.

=== Armenia vs. Madagascar ===
Armenia
1
Tere Tennis Center, Tallinn, Estonia
8 February 2014
Hard (indoors)

Madagascar
2

| | | | 1 | 2 | 3 |
|---|---|---|---|---|---|
| 1 | (Armenia) (Madagascar) | Lusine Chobanyan; Nantenaina Ramalalaharivololona | 1; 6 | 3; 6 |
| 2 | (Armenia) (Madagascar) | Ani Amiraghyan; Sandra Andriamarosoa | 6; 3 | 2; 6 | 7; 5 |
| 3 | (Armenia) (Madagascar) | Ani Amiraghyan / Milena Avetisyan; Sandra Andriamarosoa / Nantenaina Ramalalaharivololona | 5; 7 | 4; 6 |

=== Cyprus vs. Iceland ===
Cyprus
3
Tere Tennis Center, Tallinn, Estonia
8 February 2014
Hard (indoors)

Iceland
0

| | | | 1 | 2 | 3 |
|---|---|---|---|---|---|
| 1 | (Cyprus) (Iceland) | Andria Tsaggaridou; Anna Soffia Grönholm | 6; 2 | 6; 0 |
| 2 | (Cyprus) (Iceland) | Maria Siopacha; Hjördís Rósa Guðmundsdóttir | 6; 0 | 6; 2 |
| 3 | (Cyprus) (Iceland) | Eliza Omirou / Atlanta Patsali; Hera Brynjarsdóttir / Anna Soffia Grönholm | 6; 1 | 6; 0 |

== Final placements ==
| Placing | Teams | |
|---|---|---|
| Promoted | Estonia | Ireland |
| Third | Denmark | Greece |
| Fifth | Norway | Moldova |
| Seventh | Namibia | Malta |
| Ninth | Madagascar | Cyprus |
| Eleventh | Armenia | Iceland |

- Estonia and Ireland advanced to Europe/Africa Group II in 2015.
