= Lesedi Sheya Jacobs =

Namibian tennis player

- Country (sports): Namibia
- Born: 1 October 1997 (age 28) Windhoek, Namibia
- Plays: Right-handed
- College: University of Kentucky
- Prize money: $3,395

Singles
- Career record: 15–8
- Career titles: 1 ITF
- Highest ranking: No. 871 (31 October 2016)

Doubles
- Career record: 7–7
- Career titles: 0
- Highest ranking: No. 1065 (26 September 2016)

Lesedi Sheya Jacobs (born 1 October 1997) is a female Namibian tennis player.

Jacobs has won one singles title on the ITF Circuit, and reached a career-high singles ranking of 871 on 31 October 2016.

Playing for Namibia Fed Cup team, Jacobs has a win–loss record of 10–16 (as of July 2024).

On the ITF Junior Circuit, she reached a career-high ranking of world No. 88 on 8 June 2015.

Jacobs is attending the University of Kentucky from 2015.

== ITF finals ==
=== Singles (1–0) ===
Legend $25,000 tournaments $10,000 tournaments	Finals by surface Hard (1–0) Clay (0–0)

Result	Date	Tier	Tournament	Surface	Opponent	Score
Win	8 November 2015	10,000	Stellenbosch, South Africa	Hard	(Germany) Luisa Marie Huber	7–6^{(7–3)}, 5–7, 6–1

=== Doubles (0–1) ===
Legend $25,000 tournaments $10,000 tournaments	Finals by surface Hard (0–1) Clay (0–0)

Result	Date	Tier	Tournament	Surface	Partner	Opponent	Score
Loss	7 November 2015	10,000	Stellenbosch, South Africa	Hard	(Zimbabwe) Valeria Bhunu	(South Africa) Madrie Le Roux (Netherlands) Erika Vogelsang	6–7^{(6–8)}, 2–6

== Fed Cup participation ==
=== Singles (3–7) ===
Edition	Stage	Date	Location	Against	Surface	Opponent	W/L	Score
2012 Fed Cup; Europe/Africa Zone; Group III	R/R	16 April 2012	Cairo, Egypt	Lithuania	Clay	(Lithuania) Lina Stančiūtė	L	1–6, 0–6
2012 Fed Cup; Europe/Africa Zone; Group III	R/R	17 April 2012	Cairo, Egypt	Egypt	Clay	(Egypt) Mai El Kamash	L	1–6, 3–6
2012 Fed Cup; Europe/Africa Zone; Group III	R/R	20 April 2012	Cairo, Egypt	Cyprus	Clay	(Cyprus) Joanna Nena Savva	L	6–7^{(6–8)}, 3–6
2014 Fed Cup; Europe/Africa Zone; Group III	R/R	5 February 2014	Tallinn, Estonia	(Estonia) Estonia	Hard (i)	(Estonia) Kaia Kanepi	L	1–6, 1–6
2014 Fed Cup; Europe/Africa Zone; Group III	R/R	6 February 2014	Tallinn, Estonia	Armenia	Hard (i)	(Armenia) Ani Amiraghyan	L	2–6, 0–6
2014 Fed Cup; Europe/Africa Zone; Group III	P/O	8 February 2014	Tallinn, Estonia	Norway	Hard (i)	(Norway) Melanie Stokke	L	2–6, 1–6
2015 Fed Cup; Europe/Africa Zone; Group III	R/R	14 April 2015	Ulcinj, Montenegro	(North Macedonia) Macedonia	Clay	(North Macedonia) Lina Gjorcheska	L	6–7^{(1–7)}, 0–6
2015 Fed Cup; Europe/Africa Zone; Group III	R/R	15 April 2015	Ulcinj, Montenegro	Mozambique	Clay	(Mozambique) Cláudia Sumaia	W	6–1, 6–1
2015 Fed Cup; Europe/Africa Zone; Group III	R/R	16 April 2015	Ulcinj, Montenegro	Moldova	Clay	(Moldova) Daniela Ciobanu	W	6–1, 6–3
2015 Fed Cup; Europe/Africa Zone; Group III	P/O	17 April 2015	Ulcinj, Montenegro	Iceland	Clay	(Iceland) Hjördís Rósa Guðmundsdóttir	W	6–1, 6–1

=== Doubles (3–6) ===
Edition	Stage	Date	Location	Against	Surface	Partner	Opponents	W/L	Score
2012 Fed Cup; Europe/Africa Zone; Group III	R/R	16 April 2012	Cairo, Egypt	Tunisia	Clay	(Namibia) Carita Moolman	(Lithuania) Justina Mikulskytė (Lithuania) Lina Stančiūtė	L	2–6, 0–6
2012 Fed Cup; Europe/Africa Zone; Group III	R/R	17 April 2012	Cairo, Egypt	Egypt	Clay	(Namibia) Carita Moolman	(Egypt) Menna El Nadgy (Egypt) Mora Eshak	L	4–6, 2–6
2012 Fed Cup; Europe/Africa Zone; Group III	R/R	19 April 2012	Cairo, Egypt	Moldova	Clay	(Namibia) Liniques Theron	(Moldova) Julia Helbet (Moldova) Melisa Martinov	W	6–1, 3–6, 6–3
2014 Fed Cup; Europe/Africa Zone; Group III	R/R	5 February 2014	Tallinn, Estonia	Estonia	Hard (i)	(Namibia) Liniques Theron	(Estonia) Eva Paalma (Estonia) Tatjana Vorobjova	L	5–7, 2–6
2014 Fed Cup; Europe/Africa Zone; Group III	R/R	6 February 2014	Tallinn, Estonia	Armenia	Hard (i)	(Namibia) Liniques Theron	(Armenia) Ani Amiraghyan (Armenia) Milena Avetisyan	W	7–6^{(7–5)}, 6–2
2014 Fed Cup; Europe/Africa Zone; Group III	P/O	8 February 2014	Tallinn, Estonia	Norway	Hard (i)	(Namibia) Liniques Theron	(Norway) Ida Seljevoll Skancke (Norway) Melanie Stokke	L	2–6, 3–6
2015 Fed Cup; Europe/Africa Zone; Group III	R/R	14 April 2015	Ulcinj, Montenegro	(North Macedonia) Macedonia	Clay	(Namibia) Lize-Elfrida Moolman	(North Macedonia) Lina Gjorcheska (North Macedonia) Magdalena Stoilkovska	L	1–6, 2–6
2015 Fed Cup; Europe/Africa Zone; Group III	R/R	15 April 2015	Ulcinj, Montenegro	Mozambique	Clay	(Namibia) Lize-Elfrida Moolman	(Mozambique) Marieta de Lyubov Nhamitambo (Mozambique) Cláudia Sumaia	W	6–0, 6–0
2015 Fed Cup; Europe/Africa Zone; Group III	R/R	16 April 2015	Ulcinj, Montenegro	Moldova	Clay	(Namibia) Liniques Theron	(Moldova) Julia Helbet (Moldova) Alexandra Perper	L	3–6, 2–6
