= 2012 Fed Cup Europe/Africa Zone Group III – play-offs =

International tennis competition play-offs

The play-offs of the 2012 Fed Cup Europe/Africa Zone Group III were the final stages of the Group III Zonal Competition involving teams from Europe and Africa. Using the positions determined in their pools, the seven teams faced off to determine their placing in the 2012 Fed Cup Europe/Africa Zone Group III. The top two teams advanced to Fed Cup Europe/Africa Zone Group II.

Placing	Pool A	Pool B
1	Morocco	Tunisia
2	Ireland	Lithuania
3	Armenia	Egypt
4	Malta	Moldova
5	Kenya	Cyprus
6		Namibia

== Promotion play-offs ==
The first and second placed teams of each pool were drawn in head-to-head rounds. The winner of each round advanced to Group II in 2013.

=== Morocco vs. Lithuania ===
Morocco
1
Golf El Solaimaneyah Club, Cairo, Egypt
21 April 2012
Red clay (outdoors)

Lithuania
2

			1	2	3
1	(Morocco) (Lithuania)	Fatima El Allami; Joana Eidukonytė	6^{5} 7^{7}	6; 2	6; 4
2	(Morocco) (Lithuania)	Fatyha Berjane; Lina Stančiūtė	1; 6	1; 6
3	(Morocco) (Lithuania)	Fatima El Allami / Bahia Mouhtassine; Justina Mikulskytė / Lina Stančiūtė	4; 6	5; 7

=== Tunisia vs. Ireland ===
Tunisia
2
Golf El Solaimaneyah Club, Cairo, Egypt
21 April 2012
Red clay (outdoors)

Ireland
1

			1	2	3
1	(Tunisia) (Republic of Ireland)	Nour Abbès; Sinéad Lohan	1; 6	6; 3	6; 3
2	(Tunisia) (Republic of Ireland)	Ons Jabeur; Amy Bowtell	6; 3	7; 5
3	(Tunisia) (Republic of Ireland)	Ons Jabeur / Mouna Jebri; Amy Bowtell / Jenny Claffey	1; 6	1; 6

== 5th to 7th play-offs ==
The third and fourth placed teams of each pool were drawn in head-to-head rounds to find the equal fifth and seventh placed teams.

=== Malta vs. Moldova ===
Malta
1
Golf El Solaimaneyah Club, Cairo, Egypt
21 April 2012
Red clay (outdoors)

Moldova
2

			1	2	3
1	(Malta) (Moldova)	Elaine Genovese; Alina Soltanici	6; 3	6; 1
2	(Malta) (Moldova)	Rosanne Dimech; Julia Helbert	3; 6	1; 6
3	(Malta) (Moldova)	Rosanne Dimech / Elaine Genovese; Julia Helbert / Melisa Martinov	1; 6	6; 3	4; 6

=== Armenia vs. Egypt ===
Armenia
1
Golf El Solaimaneyah Club, Cairo, Egypt
21 April 2012
Red clay (outdoors)

Egypt
2

			1	2	3
1	(Armenia) (Egypt)	Nune Khachatryan; Menna El Nagdy	6^{4} 7^{7}	1; 6
2	(Armenia) (Egypt)	Ani Amiraghyan; Mai El Kamash	7^{9} 6^{7}	6; 1
3	(Armenia) (Egypt)	Ani Amiraghyan / Anna Movsisyan; Mai El Kamash / Mora Eshak	3; 6	6; 4	5; 7

== 9th to 10th play-offs ==
The fifth placed teams of each pool were drawn in head-to-head rounds to find the ninth and tenth placed teams.

=== Kenya vs. Cyprus ===
Kenya
0
Golf El Solaimaneyah Club, Cairo, Egypt
21 April 2012
Red clay (outdoors)

Cyprus
3

			1	2	3
1	(Kenya) (Cyprus)	Veronica Osogo Nabwire; Mara Argyriou	2; 6	2; 6
2	(Kenya) (Cyprus)	Caroline Oduor; Joanna Nena Savva	0; 6	0; 6
3	(Kenya) (Cyprus)	Caroline Oduor / Veronica Osogo Nabwire; Mara Argyriou / Maria Siopacha	4; 6	1; 6

== Final Placements ==
Placing	Teams
Promoted	Lithuania
Promoted	Tunisia
Third	Morocco
Third	Ireland
Fifth	Egypt
Fifth	Moldova
Seventh	Armenia
Seventh	Malta
Ninth	Cyprus
Tenth	Kenya
Eleventh	Namibia

- Lithuania and Tunisia were promoted to Europe/Africa Zone Group II for 2013.

== See also ==
- Fed Cup structure
