= Liniques Theron =

Namibian tennis player (born 1995)

- Country (sports): Namibia
- Born: 4 January 1995 (age 31) Windhoek, Namibia
- Plays: Right-handed
- Prize money: $3,498

Singles
- Career record: 13-28
- Highest ranking: 1,170 (12 June 2017)

Doubles
- Career record: 11-18
- Highest ranking: 1,138 (23 November 2015)

Liniques Theron (born 4 January 1995 in Windhoek) is a retired Namibian female tennis player.

Theron reached a career-high singles ranking of 1170 on 12 June 2017 and career-high doubles ranking of 1138 on 23 November 2015.

Playing for Namibia at the Fed Cup, Theron has a win–loss record of 5–11.

== ITF finals ==
=== Doubles: 1 (0–1) ===
Legend $100,000 tournaments $75,000 tournaments $50,000 tournaments $25,000 tournaments $10,000 tournaments	Finals by surface Hard (0–0) Clay (0–1) Grass (0–0) Carpet (0–0)

Outcome	Date	Tournament	Surface	Partner	Opponent	Score
Runner-up	12 June 2015	Antananarivo, Madagascar	Clay	(South Africa) Madrie Le Roux	(Madagascar) Sandra Andriamarosoa (Madagascar) Zarah Razafimahatratra	3–6, 2–6

== Fed Cup participation ==
=== Singles ===
Edition	Stage	Date	Location	Against	Surface	Opponent	W/L	Score
2012 Fed Cup; Europe/Africa Zone Group III	R/R	18 April 2012	Cairo, Egypt	(Tunisia) Tunisia	Clay	(Tunisia) Nour Abbès	L	2–6, 2–6
2012 Fed Cup; Europe/Africa Zone Group III	R/R	19 April 2012	Cairo, Egypt	Cyprus	Clay	(Cyprus) Mara Argyriou	L	6–7^{(5–7)}, 2–6
2013 Fed Cup; Europe/Africa Zone Group III	R/R	8 May 2013	Chișinău, Moldova	(Denmark) Denmark	Clay	(Denmark) Marie Jespersen	L	4–6, 2–6
2013 Fed Cup; Europe/Africa Zone Group III	R/R	9 May 2013	Chișinău, Moldova	Morocco	Clay	(Morocco) Nadia Lalami	L	6–1, 2–6, 0–6
2013 Fed Cup; Europe/Africa Zone Group III	P/O	11 May 2013	Chișinău, Moldova	Norway	Clay	(Norway) Melanie Stokke	L	3–6, 2–6
2015 Fed Cup; Europe/Africa Zone Group III	P/O	17 April 2015	Ulcinj, Montenegro	Iceland	Clay	(Iceland) Anna Soffia Grönholm	W	6–1, 6–4

=== Doubles ===
Edition	Stage	Date	Location	Against	Surface	Partner	Opponents	W/L	Score
2012 Fed Cup; Europe/Africa Zone Group III	R/R	18 April 2012	Cairo, Egypt	Tunisia	Clay	(Namibia) Kerstin Gressmann	(Tunisia) Nour Abbès (Tunisia) Mouna Jebri	W	7–6^{(7–4)}, 6–4
2012 Fed Cup; Europe/Africa Zone Group III	R/R	19 April 2012	Cairo, Egypt	Moldova	Clay	(Namibia) Lesedi Sheya Jacobs	(Moldova) Julia Helbet (Moldova) Melisa Martinov	W	6–1, 3–6, 6–3
2013 Fed Cup; Europe/Africa Zone Group III	R/R	8 May 2013	Chișinău, Moldova	(Estonia) Denmark	Clay	(Namibia) Rieke Honiball	(Denmark) Malou Ejdesgaard (Denmark) Mai Grage	L	0–6, 0–6
2013 Fed Cup; Europe/Africa Zone Group III	R/R	9 May 2013	Chișinău, Moldova	Morocco	Clay	(Namibia) Rieke Honiball	(Morocco) Fatima El Allami (Morocco) Nadia Lalami	L	1–6, 3–6
2013 Fed Cup; Europe/Africa Zone Group III	P/O	11 May 2013	Chișinău, Moldova	Norway	Clay	(Namibia) Rieke Honiball	(Norway) Andrea Raaholt (Norway) Melanie Stokke	L	2–6, 4–6
2014 Fed Cup; Europe/Africa Zone Group III	R/R	5 February 2014	Tallinn, Estonia	Estonia	Hard (i)	(Namibia) Lesedi Sheya Jacobs	(Estonia) Eva Paalma (Estonia) Tatjana Vorobjova	L	5–7, 2–6
2014 Fed Cup; Europe/Africa Zone Group III	R/R	6 February 2014	Tallinn, Estonia	Armenia	Hard (i)	(Namibia) Lesedi Sheya Jacobs	(Armenia) Ani Amiraghyan (Armenia) Milena Avetisyan	W	7–6^{(7–5)}, 6–2
2014 Fed Cup; Europe/Africa Zone Group III	P/O	8 February 2014	Tallinn, Estonia	Norway	Hard (i)	(Namibia) Lesedi Sheya Jacobs	(Norway) Ida Seljevoll Skancke (Norway) Melanie Stokke	L	2–6, 3–6
2015 Fed Cup; Europe/Africa Zone Group III	R/R	16 April 2015	Ulcinj, Montenegro	Moldova	Clay	(Namibia) Lesedi Sheya Jacobs	(Moldova) Julia Helbet (Moldova) Alexandra Perper	L	3–6, 2–6
2015 Fed Cup; Europe/Africa Zone Group III	P/O	17 April 2015	Ulcinj, Montenegro	Iceland	Clay	(Namibia) Lize-Elfrida Moolman	(Iceland) Hera Brynjarsdóttir (Iceland) Anna Soffia Grönholm	W	6–1, 6–0
