= 2014 Fed Cup Europe/Africa Zone =

Subsection of tennis competition

The Europe/Africa Zone was one of three zones of regional competition in the 2014 Fed Cup.

== Group I ==
- Venue: Syma Sport and Events Centre, Budapest, Hungary (indoor hard)
- Date: 4–9 February

The sixteen teams were divided into four pools of four teams. The four pool winners took part in play-offs to determine the two nations advancing to the World Group II play-offs. The nations finishing last in their pools took part in relegation play-offs, with the two losing nations being relegated to Group II for 2015.

=== Pools ===
| | Pool A | NED | BEL | CRO | LUX |
| 1 | Netherlands (3–0) | | 3–0 | 3–0 | 3–0 |
| 2 | Belgium (2–1) | 0–3 | | 3–0 | 3–0 |
| 3 | Croatia (1–2) | 0–3 | 0–3 | | 3–0 |
| 4 | Luxembourg (0–3) | 0–3 | 0–3 | 0–3 | |

| | Pool B | ROU | HUN | GBR | LAT |
| 1 | Romania (3–0) | | 2–1 | 2–1 | 2–1 |
| 2 | Hungary (2–1) | 1–2 | | 2–1 | 2–1 |
| 3 | Great Britain (1–2) | 1–2 | 1–2 | | 2–1 |
| 4 | Latvia (0–3) | 1–2 | 1–2 | 1–2 | |

| | Pool C | UKR | ISR | AUT | SLO |
| 1 | Ukraine (3–0) | | 3–0 | 2–1 | 3–0 |
| 2 | Israel (2–1) | 0–3 | | 2–1 | 2–1 |
| 3 | Austria (1–2) | 1–2 | 1–2 | | 3–0 |
| 4 | Slovenia (0–3) | 0–3 | 1–2 | 0–3 | |

| | Pool D | BLR | POR | TUR | BUL |
| 1 | Belarus (3–0) | | 3–0 | 3–0 | 2–1 |
| 2 | Portugal (2–1) | 0–3 | | 2–1 | 2–1 |
| 3 | Turkey (1–2) | 0–3 | 1–2 | | 2–1 |
| 4 | Bulgaria (0–3) | 1–2 | 1–2 | 1–2 | |

=== Play-offs ===
| Placing | A Team | Score | D Team |
|---|---|---|---|
| Promotional | Netherlands | 2–0 | Belarus |
| 5th–8th | Belgium | 2–1 | Portugal |
| 9th–12th | Croatia | 2–1 | Turkey |
| Relegation | Luxembourg | 0–2 | Bulgaria |

| Placing | B Team | Score | C Team |
|---|---|---|---|
| Promotional | Romania | 2–0 | Ukraine |
| 5th–8th | Hungary | 2–1 | Israel |
| 9th–12th | Great Britain | 2–0 | Austria |
| Relegation | Latvia | 2–0 | Slovenia |

- Netherlands and Romania advanced to World Group II play-offs.
- Luxembourg and Slovenia were relegated to Europe/Africa Group II in 2015.

== Group II ==
- Venue: Šiauliai Tennis School, Šiauliai, Lithuania (indoor hard)
- Dates: 16–19 April

The eight teams were divided into two pools of four teams. The two nations placing first and second took part in play-offs to determine the two nations advancing to Group I. The nations finished last in their pools took part in relegation play-offs, with the two losing nations being relegated to Group III for 2015.

=== Pools ===
| | Pool A | LIE | FIN | LIT | MNE |
| 1 | Liechtenstein (3–0) | | 2–1 | 2–1 | 3–0 |
| 2 | Finland (2–1) | 1–2 | | 2–1 | 3–0 |
| 3 | Lithuania (1–2) | 1–2 | 1–2 | | 3–0 |
| 4 | Montenegro (0–3) | 0–3 | 0–3 | 0–3 | |

| | Pool B | GEO | BIH | RSA | EGY |
| 1 | Georgia (3–0) | | 3–0 | 2–1 | 3–0 |
| 2 | Bosnia and Herzegovina (2–1) | 0–3 | | 2–1 | 2–1 |
| 3 | South Africa (1–2) | 1–2 | 1–2 | | 3–0 |
| 4 | Egypt (0–3) | 0–3 | 1–2 | 0–3 | |

=== Play-offs ===
| Placing | A Team | Score | B Team |
|---|---|---|---|
| Promotional | Liechtenstein | 2–0 | Bosnia and Herzegovina |
| Promotional | Finland | 1–2 | Georgia |
| Relegation | Lithuania | 1–2 | Egypt |
| Relegation | Montenegro | 0–3 | South Africa |

- Liechtenstein and Georgia advanced to Europe/Africa Group I in 2015.
- Montenegro and Lithuania were relegated to Europe/Africa Group III in 2015.

== Group III ==
- Venue: Tere Tennis Center, Tallinn, Estonia (indoor hard)
- Dates: 5–8 February

The twelve teams were divided into four pools of three teams. The four pool winners took part in play-offs to determine the two nations advancing to Group II for 2015.

=== Pools ===
| | Pool A | EST | NAM | ARM |
| 1 | Estonia (2–0) | | 3–0 | 3–0 |
| 2 | Namibia (1–1) | 0–3 | | 2–1 |
| 3 | Armenia (0–2) | 0–3 | 1–2 | |

| | Pool B | GRE | MDA | CYP |
| 1 | Greece (2–0) | | 2–1 | 3–0 |
| 2 | Moldova (1–1) | 1–2 | | 3–0 |
| 3 | Cyprus (0–2) | 0–3 | 0–3 | |

| | Pool C | DEN | NOR | MAD |
| 1 | Denmark (2–0) | | 2–1 | 3–0 |
| 2 | Norway (1–1) | 1–2 | | 2–1 |
| 3 | Madagascar (0–2) | 0–3 | 1–2 | |

| | Pool D | IRL | MLT | ISL |
| 1 | Ireland (2–0) | | 2–1 | 3–0 |
| 2 | Malta (1–1) | 1–2 | | 3–0 |
| 3 | Iceland (0–2) | 0–3 | 0–3 | |

=== Play-offs ===
| Placing | A Team | Score | C Team |
|---|---|---|---|
| Promotional | Estonia | 2–0 | Denmark |
| 5th–8th | Namibia | 0–3 | Norway |
| 9th–12th | Armenia | 1–2 | Madagascar |

| Placing | B Team | Score | D Team |
|---|---|---|---|
| Promotional | Greece | 1–2 | Ireland |
| 5th–8th | Moldova | 3–0 | Malta |
| 9th–12th | Cyprus | 3–0 | Iceland |

- Estonia and Ireland advanced to Europe/Africa Group II in 2015.
