= Mai El Kamash =

Egyptian tennis player

Mai El Kamash مي القماش
- Country (sports): Egypt
- Born: 10 September 1994 (age 30); Cairo, Egypt
- Plays: Right (two-handed backhand)
- Prize money: $4,280

Singles
- Career record: 16–16
- Career titles: 0
- Highest ranking: No. 913 (15 July 2013)

Doubles
- Career record: 32–32
- Career titles: 1 ITF
- Highest ranking: No. 876 (7 October 2013)

Team competitions
- Fed Cup: 6–6

Mai El Kamash (Arabic: مي القماش; born 10 September 1994) is an Egyptian former professional tennis player.

El Kamash has reached career-high rankings of 913 in singles and 876 in doubles by the Women's Tennis Association (WTA). She won one doubles title on tournaments of the ITF Women's Circuit.

Playing for the Egypt Fed Cup team, El Kamash has a win-loss record of 6–6.

== ITF Circuit finals ==
=== Doubles (1–2) ===
Legend $25,000 tournaments $10,000 tournaments	Finals by surface Hard (1–2) Clay (0–0)

Outcome	No.	Date	Tournament	Surface	Partner	Opponents	Score
Runner-up	1.	23 June 2013	Sharm El Sheikh, Egypt	Hard	(South Africa) Madrie Le Roux	(Italy) Alessia Camplone (Italy) Valeria Prosper	4–6, 5–7
Winner	2.	30 June 2013	Sharm El Sheikh, Egypt	Hard	(South Africa) Madrie Le Roux	(Russia) Julia Valetova (Russia) Polina Monova	6–2, 2–6, [10–1]
Runner-up	3.	16 June 2014	Sharm El Sheikh, Egypt	Hard	(Egypt) Yasmin Hamza	(Spain) Arabela Fernández Rabener (Greece) Despina Papamichail	3–6, 3–6

== Fed Cup participation ==
=== Singles ===
Edition	Stage	Date	Location	Against	Surface	Opponent	W/L	Score
2011 Fed Cup; Europe/Africa Zone Group III	R/R	5 May 2011	Cairo, Egypt	Moldova	Clay	Alina Soltanici	W	6–2, 6–1
2012 Fed Cup; Europe/Africa Zone Group III	R/R	17 April 2012	Cairo, Egypt	Namibia	Clay	Lesedi Sheya Jacobs	W	6–1, 6–3
2012 Fed Cup; Europe/Africa Zone Group III	R/R	18 April 2012	Cairo, Egypt	Lithuania	Clay	Lina Stančiūtė	L	2–6, 0–6
2012 Fed Cup; Europe/Africa Zone Group III	R/R	19 April 2012	Cairo, Egypt	Tunisia	Clay	Ons Jabeur	L	3–6, 1–6
2012 Fed Cup; Europe/Africa Zone Group III	R/R	20 April 2012	Cairo, Egypt	Moldova	Clay	Julia Helbert	W	6–0, 6–2
2012 Fed Cup; Europe/Africa Zone Group III	P/O	21 April 2012	Cairo, Egypt	Armenia	Clay	Ani Amiraghyan	L	6–7^{(7–9)}, 1–6
2017 Fed Cup; Europe/Africa Zone Group II	R/R	19 April 2017	Šiauliai, Lithuania	Lithuania	Hard (i)	Paulina Bakaitė	L	2–6, 6–7^{(2–7)}
2017 Fed Cup; Europe/Africa Zone Group II	R/R	20 April 2017	Šiauliai, Lithuania	Denmark	Hard (i)	Emilie Francati	L	3–6, 2–6
2017 Fed Cup; Europe/Africa Zone Group II	P/O	21 April 2017	Šiauliai, Lithuania	South Africa	Hard (i)	Ilze Hattingh	W	7–5, 1–6, 6–2

=== Doubles ===
Edition	Stage	Date	Location	Against	Surface	Partner	Opponents	W/L	Score
2011 Fed Cup; Europe/Africa Zone Group III	P/O	7 May 2011	Cairo, Egypt	South Africa	Clay	(Egypt) Mayar Sherif	Natasha Fourouclas; Madrie Le Roux	L	5–7, 6–4, [6–10]
2012 Fed Cup; Europe/Africa Zone Group III	R/R	16 April 2012	Cairo, Egypt	Cyprus	Clay	(Egypt) Mora Eshak	Maria Siopacha; Andria Tsaggaridou	W	6–0, 6–1
2012 Fed Cup; Europe/Africa Zone Group III	P/O	21 April 2012	Cairo, Egypt	Armenia	Clay	(Egypt) Mora Eshak	Ani Amiraghyan; Anna Movsisyan	W	6–3, 4–6, 7–5
