= 2012 Fed Cup Europe/Africa Zone =

Subsection of tennis competition

The Europe/Africa Zone was one of three zones of regional competition in the 2012 Fed Cup.

== Group I ==
- Venue: Municipal Tennis Club, Eilat, Israel (hard, outdoors)
- Date: 1–4 February

The fifteen teams were divided into three pools of four teams and one pool of three. The four pool winners took part in play-offs to determine the two nations advancing to the World Group II Play-offs. The nations finishing last in their pools took part in play-offs, with the two losing nations relegated to Group II for 2013.

=== Pools ===
	Pool A	AUT	BUL	EST
1	Austria (2–0)		2–1	2–1
2	Bulgaria (1–1)	1–2		3–0
3	Estonia (0–2)	1–2	0–3	

	Pool B	SWE	HUN	BIH	GRE
1	Sweden (3–0)		2–1	3–0	2–1
2	Hungary (2–1)	1–2		2–1	3–0
3	Bosnia and Herzegovina (1–2)	0–3	1–2		3–0
4	Greece (0–3)	1–2	0–3	0–3	

	Pool C	GBR	POR	ISR	NED
1	Great Britain (3–0)		3–0	3–0	2–1
2	Portugal (2–1)	0–3		2–1	2–1
3	Israel (1–2)	0–3	1–2		2–1
4	Netherlands (0–3)	1–2	1–2	1–2	

	Pool D	POL	ROU	CRO	LUX
1	Poland (3–0)		2–1	3–0	3–0
2	Romania (2–1)	1–2		2–1	3–0
3	Croatia (1–2)	0–3	1–2		2–1
4	Luxembourg (0–3)	0–3	0–3	1–2	

=== Play-offs ===
Placing	A Team	Score	C Team
Promotional	Austria	0–2	Great Britain
5th–8th	Bulgaria	0–2	Portugal
9th–12th	N/A	–	Israel
Relegation	Estonia	1–2	Netherlands

Placing	B Team	Score	D Team
Promotional	Sweden	2–1	Poland
5th–8th	Hungary	0–2	Romania
9th–12th	Bosnia and Herzegovina	0–2	Croatia
Relegation	Greece	1–2	Luxembourg

- Great Britain and Sweden advanced to World Group II play-offs.
- Estonia and Greece were relegated to Europe/Africa Group II in 2013.

== Group II ==
- Venue: Golf El Solaimaneyah Club, Cairo, Egypt (clay, outdoors)
- Date: Week of 16 April (ties played 18–21 April)

The eight teams were divided into two pools of four. The top nation from each pool played off against the runner-up from the other with the two winning teams promoted to the Europe/Africa Zone Group I for 2013. Third-placed nations played-off against fourth placing nations with the losing teams facing relegation to the Europe/Africa Zone Group III for 2013.

=== Pools ===
	Pool A	RSA	MNE	FIN	DEN
1	South Africa (3–0)		3–0	3–0	3–0
2	Montenegro (2–1)	0–3		3–0	2–1
3	Finland (1–2)	0–3	0–3		2–1
4	Denmark (0–3)	0–3	1–2	1–2	

	Pool B	GEO	TUR	LAT	NOR
1	Georgia (3–0)		3–0	2–1	3–0
2	Turkey (2–1)	0–3		2–1	3–0
3	Latvia (1–2)	1–2	1–2		3–0
4	Norway (0–3)	0–3	0–3	0–3	

=== Play-offs ===
Placing	A Team	Score	B Team
Promotion	South Africa	0–3	Turkey
Promotion	Montenegro	0–3	Georgia
Relegation	Finland	3–0	Norway
Relegation	Denmark	0–3	Latvia

- Turkey and Georgia promoted to Europe/Africa World Group I in 2013.
- Norway and Denmark were relegated to Europe/Africa Group III in 2013.

== Group III ==
- Venue: Golf El Solaimaneyah Club, Cairo, Egypt (clay, outdoors)
- Date: Week of 16 April (ties played 16–21 April)

The eleven teams were divided into one pool of five teams and one pool of six. The top nation from each pool played off against the runner-up from the other with the two winning teams promoted to the Europe/Africa Zone Group II for 2013.

=== Pools ===
	Pool A	MAR	IRL	ARM	MLT	KEN
1	Morocco (4–0)		2–1	2–1	2–1	3–0
2	Ireland (3–1)	1–2		2–1	2–1	3–0
3	Armenia (2–2)	1–2	1–2		3–0	3–0
4	Malta (1–3)	1–2	1–2	0–3		3–0
5	Kenya (0–4)	0–3	0–3	0–3	0–3	

	Pool B	TUN	LIT	EGY	MDA	CYP	NAM
1	Tunisia (5–0)		2–1	3–0	3–0	3–0	2–1
2	Lithuania (4–1)	1–2		3–0	3–0	3–0	3–0
3	Egypt (3–2)	0–3	0–3		3–0	3–0	3–0
4	Moldova (2–3)	0–3	0–3	0–3		2–1	2–1
5	Cyprus (1–4)	0–3	0–3	0–3	1–2		2–1
6	Namibia (0–5)	0–3	0–3	0–3	1–2	1–2	

=== Play-offs ===
Placing	A Team	Score	B Team
Promotion	Morocco	1–2	Lithuania
Promotion	Ireland	1–2	Tunisia
5th–8th	Armenia	1–2	Egypt
5th–8th	Malta	1–2	Moldova
9th–10th	Kenya	0–3	Cyprus
11th	N/A	–	Namibia

- Lithuania and Tunisia promoted to Europe/Africa Zone Group II in 2012.

== See also ==
- Fed Cup structure
