= Kerstin Gressmann =

Namibian tennis player

- Country (sports): Namibia
- Residence: Sitges, Spain
- Born: 17 January 1994 (age 32) Swakopmund, Namibia
- Plays: Right-handed (two-handed backhand)
- Prize money: $722

Singles
- Career record: 1–6

Doubles
- Career record: 2–3
- Last updated on: 30 July 2015.

Kerstin Gressmann (born 17 January 1994 in Swakopmund) is a Namibian tennis player.

Playing for Namibia at the Fed Cup, Gressmann has a win-loss record of 4-6.

Gressmann began playing tennis at age 8. In 2007, she relocated to Stellenbosch, South Africa, where she trained at the Kainos Tennis Academy and attended Stellenbosch High School. Following graduation, she left South Africa to further develop her game at the Barcelona Tennis Academy in Spain.

Gressmann is fluent in English, German, and Afrikaans.

== Fed Cup participation ==
=== Singles ===
Edition	Stage	Date	Location	Against	Surface	Opponent	W/L	Score
2012 Fed Cup; Europe/Africa Zone Group III	R/R	18 April 2012	Cairo, Egypt	(Tunisia) Tunisia	Clay	(Tunisia) Ons Jabeur	L	2–6, 1–6
2012 Fed Cup; Europe/Africa Zone Group III	R/R	19 April 2012	Cairo, Egypt	Moldova	Clay	(Moldova) Alina Soltanici	L	7–6^{(8–6)}, 2-6, 5-7
2014 Fed Cup; Europe/Africa Zone Group III	R/R	5 February 2014	Tallinn, Estonia	(Estonia) Estonia	Hard (i)	(Estonia) Anett Kontaveit	L	2–6, 0–6
2014 Fed Cup; Europe/Africa Zone Group III	R/R	6 February 2014	Tallinn, Estonia	Armenia	Hard (i)	(Armenia) Lusine Chobanyan	W	6–2, 6–3
2014 Fed Cup; Europe/Africa Zone Group III	P/O	8 February 2014	Tallinn, Estonia	Norway	Hard (i)	(Norway) Ida Seljevoll Skancke	L	1–6, 1–6
2015 Fed Cup; Europe/Africa Zone Group III	R/R	14 April 2015	Ulcinj, Montenegro	(North Macedonia) Macedonia	Clay	(North Macedonia) Magdalena Stoilkovska	L	4–6, 4–6
2015 Fed Cup; Europe/Africa Zone Group III	R/R	15 April 2015	Ulcinj, Montenegro	Mozambique	Clay	(Mozambique) Marieta de Lyubov Nhamitambo	W	6–0, 6–2
2015 Fed Cup; Europe/Africa Zone Group III	R/R	16 April 2015	Ulcinj, Montenegro	Moldova	Clay	(Moldova) Julia Helbet	L	4–6, 6–7^{(6–8)}

=== Doubles ===
Edition	Stage	Date	Location	Against	Surface	Partner	Opponents	W/L	Score
2012 Fed Cup; Europe/Africa Zone Group III	R/R	18 April 2012	Cairo, Egypt	Tunisia	Clay	(Namibia) Liniques Theron	(Tunisia) Nour Abbès (Tunisia) Mouna Jebri	W	7–6^{(7–4)}, 6–4
2012 Fed Cup; Europe/Africa Zone Group III	R/R	20 April 2012	Cairo, Egypt	Cyprus	Clay	(Namibia) Carita Moolman	(Cyprus) Maria Siopacha (Cyprus) Andria Tsaggaridou	W	4–6, 6–0, 6–4
