= Lina Gjorcheska =

Macedonian tennis player

Lina Gjorcheska Лина Ѓорческа
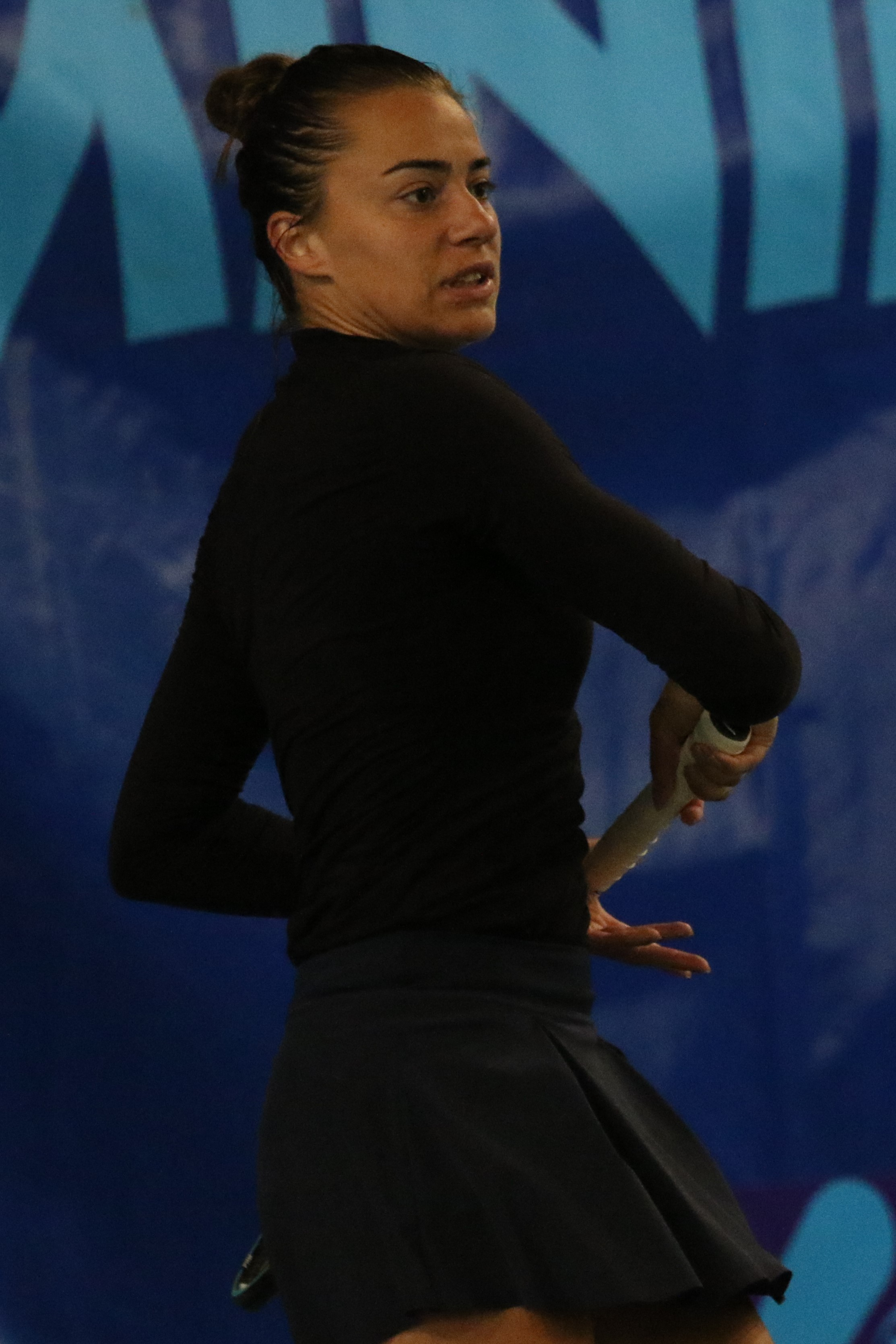
- Gjorcheska at the 2021 ITF Poitiers
- Country (sports): North Macedonia
- Born: 3 August 1994 (age 32) Tetovo, Macedonia
- Height: 1.80 m (5 ft 11 in)
- Plays: Right (two-handed backhand)
- Prize money: $525,499

Singles
- Career record: 483–284
- Career titles: 15 ITF
- Highest ranking: No. 170 (12 June 2017)
- Current ranking: No. 217 (15 June 2026)

Grand Slam singles results
- Australian Open: Q3 (2017)
- French Open: Q1 (2017, 2024, 2026)
- Wimbledon: 1R (2026)
- US Open: Q2 (2018)

Doubles
- Career record: 312–107
- Career titles: 47 ITF
- Highest ranking: No. 116 (12 June 2017)

Grand Slam doubles results
- Wimbledon: Q1 (2017)

Team competitions
- Fed Cup: 30–7
- Last updated on: 20 June 2026.

Lina Gjorcheska (Macedonian: Лина Ѓорческа, Lina Ǵorčeska; born 3 August 1994) is a Macedonian tennis player. She is the first player from North Macedonia to participate in the singles main draw of a Grand Slam event. She has career-high WTA rankings of world No. 170 in singles and No. 116 in doubles, both achieved on 12 June 2017.

She has won 15 singles and 47 doubles titles on the ITF Women's Circuit. Playing for North Macedonia in Billie Jean King Cup, Gjorcheska has a win–loss record of 30–7.

== Career ==
At the 2016 US Open, she lost in the first round of qualifying to Catherine Bellis. It was her first appearance in a Grand Slam event.

At her first appearance at the Australian Open in 2017, Gjorcheska beat Sachia Vickery in the first round of qualifying. In the second round, she beat Dalma Gálfi in straight sets and then lost to Stefanie Vögele in three. She played her first WTA Tour main draw at the 2017 Ladies Open Biel Bienne, and lost in the first round to Markéta Vondroušová.

Partnering with Jil Teichmann, she was runner-up in the doubles at the WTA 125 2024 Zavarovalnica Sava Ljubljana, losing to Nuria Brancaccio and Leyre Romero Gormaz in the final.

At 2026 Wimbledon, Gjorcheska qualified for the main draw of a Grand Slam tournament for the first time by defeating Ángela Fita Boluda, Francisca Jorge, and Lucia Bronzetti. She became the first player from North Macedonia, male or female, to play in the singles main draw of a Grand Slam tournament. Gjorcheska lost to sixth seed Amanda Anisimova in the first round.

== Grand Slam singles performance ==
Key
W	F	SF	QF	#R	RR	Q#	DNQ	A	NH

(W) winner; (F) finalist; (SF) semifinalist; (QF) quarterfinalist; (#R) rounds 4, 3, 2, 1; (RR) round-robin stage; (Q#) qualification round; (DNQ) did not qualify; (A) absent; (NH) not held; (SR) strike rate (events won / competed); (W–L) win–loss record.
To avoid confusion and double counting, these charts are updated at the conclusion of a tournament or when the player's participation has ended.

Tournament	2016	2017	2018	...	2024	...	2026	W–L
Australian Open	A	Q3	A		A			0–0
French Open	A	Q1	A		Q1			0–0
Wimbledon	A	Q1	A		A		R1	0–1
US Open	Q1	Q1	Q2		A			0–0
Win–loss	0–0	0–0	0–0		0–0			0–0

== WTA 125 finals ==
=== Doubles: 2 (2 runner-ups) ===
Result	Date	Tournament	Surface	Partner	Opponents	Score
Loss	Jun 2017	Bol Ladies Open, Croatia	Clay	(Bulgaria) Aleksandrina Naydenova	(Chinese Taipei) Chuang Chia-jung (Czech Republic) Renata Voráčová	4–6, 2–6
Loss	Sep 2024	Ljubljana Open, Slovenia	Clay	(Switzerland) Jil Teichmann	(Italy) Nuria Brancaccio (Spain) Leyre Romero Gormaz	7–5, 5–7, [7–10]

== ITF Circuit finals ==
=== Singles: 40 (15 titles, 25 runner-ups) ===
Legend
W60/75 tournaments (0–5)
W40/50 tournaments (2–1)
W25/35 tournaments (4–8)
W10/15 tournaments (9–11)

Result	W–L	Date	Tournament	Tier	Surface	Opponent	Score
Win	1–0	May 2012	ITF Arad, Romania	10,000	Clay	(Slovakia) Viktória Maľová	4–6, 6–4, 6–3
Loss	1–1	Aug 2012	ITF Pirot, Serbia	10,000	Clay	(Serbia) Teodora Mirčić	3–6, 1–6
Loss	1–2	Aug 2013	ITF Arad, Romania	10,000	Clay	(Russia) Anastasiya Komardina	3–6, 2–6
Loss	1–3	Oct 2013	ITF Ruse, Bulgaria	10,000	Clay	(Czech Republic) Diana Šumová	1–6, 3–6
Loss	1–4	May 2014	ITF Sousse, Tunisia	10,000	Hard	(Mexico) Ana Sofía Sánchez	3–6, 1–6
Loss	1–5	Jul 2014	ITF Prokuplje, Serbia	10,000	Clay	(Australia) Alexandra Nancarrow	6–4, 4–6, 2–6
Win	2–5	Sep 2014	ITF Varna, Bulgaria	10,000	Clay	(Czech Republic) Pernilla Mendesová	2–6, 6–4, 6–4
Loss	2–6	Dec 2014	ITF Antalya, Turkey	10,000	Clay	(Austria) Pia König	5–7, 4–6
Loss	2–7	Apr 2015	ITF Sharm El Sheikh, Egypt	10,000	Hard	(Georgia (country)) Mariam Bolkvadze	1–6, 4–6
Loss	2–8	May 2015	ITF Bol, Croatia	10,000	Clay	(Russia) Anastasiya Komardina	3–6, 3–6
Loss	2–9	May 2015	ITF Bol, Croatia	10,000	Clay	(Russia) Anastasiya Komardina	3–6, 6–1, 3–6
Win	3–9	Jun 2015	ITF Tarsus, Turkey	10,000	Clay	(Slovakia) Lenka Wienerová	6–2, 6–4
Win	4–9	Sep 2015	ITF Vrnjačka Banja, Serbia	10,000	Clay	(Slovenia) Nina Potočnik	6–7^{(4)}, 6–1, 6–0
Win	5–9	Nov 2015	ITF Antalya, Turkey	10,000	Clay	(Russia) Aleksandra Pospelova	6–3, 4–6, 6–0
Loss	5–10	Nov 2015	ITF Antalya, Turkey	10,000	Clay	(Russia) Alisa Kleybanova	3–6, 4–6
Win	6–10	Jan 2016	ITF Antalya, Turkey	10,000	Clay	(Georgia (country)) Ekaterine Gorgodze	1–6, 6–3, 6–2
Win	7–10	Apr 2016	ITF Manisa, Turkey	10,000	Clay	(Ukraine) Alona Fomina	6–1, 6–2
Win	8–10	Jul 2016	ITF Stuttgart, Germany	25,000	Clay	(Slovenia) Dalila Jakupović	6–2, 3–6, 6–4
Loss	8–11	Jul 2016	ITF Turin, Italy	25,000	Clay	(Slovenia) Dalila Jakupović	5–7, 4–6
Loss	8–12	Apr 2017	Nana Trophy, Tunisia	60,000	Clay	(Netherlands) Richèl Hogenkamp	5–7, 4–6
Win	9–12	Jul 2017	Open Denain, France	25,000	Clay	(Japan) Mari Osaka	6–2, 5–7, 7–6^{(6)}
Loss	9–13	Mar 2019	ITF Antalya, Turkey	W15	Clay	(Australia) Seone Mendez	4–6, 0–6
Win	10–13	Nov 2019	ITF Antalya, Turkey	W15	Hard	(Russia) Irina Khromacheva	6–3, 3–6, 6–1
Win	11–13	Dec 2019	ITF Antalya, Turkey	W15	Hard	(Finland) Oona Orpana	6–4, 6–7^{(5)}, 6–1
Loss	11–14	Feb 2020	Trnava Indoor, Slovakia	W25	Hard (i)	(Russia) Sofya Lansere	2–6, 3–6
Loss	11–15	Apr 2022	ITF Pula, Italy	W25	Clay	(Netherlands) Eva Vedder	2–6, 3–6
Loss	11–16	Jul 2022	ITS Cup, Czech Republic	W60	Clay	(Czech Republic) Sára Bejlek	2–6, 6–7^{(0)}
Win	12–16	Nov 2022	ITF Heraklion, Greece	W25	Clay	(Romania) Miriam Bulgaru	6–3, 6–4
Loss	12–17	Nov 2022	ITF Heraklion, Greece	W25	Clay	Ekaterina Makarova	4–6, 7–5, 5–7
Loss	12–18	Jan 2023	ITF Tallinn, Estonia	W40	Hard	(Belgium) Yanina Wickmayer	1–6, 0–2 ret.
Loss	12–19	May 2023	ITF Kuršumlijska Banja, Serbia	W25	Clay	Julia Avdeeva	1–6, 4–6
Loss	12–20	Aug 2023	ITF Osijek, Croatia	W25	Clay	(Romania) Anca Todoni	4–6, 3–6
Win	13–20	Sep 2023	ITF Kuršumlijska Banja, Serbia	W40	Clay	(Croatia) Antonia Ružić	6–3, 6–3
Loss	13–21	Mar 2024	ITF Larnaca, Cyprus	W35	Clay	(Croatia) Lucija Ćirić Bagarić	2–6, 3–6
Loss	13–22	Jul 2024	Internazionale di Roma, Italy	W75	Clay	Oksana Selekhmeteva	1–6, 6–7^{(3)}
Win	14–22	May 2025	ITF Kuršumlijska Banja, Serbia	W35	Clay	(Greece) Martha Matoula	2–6, 6–0, 6–4
Loss	14–23	Aug 2025	ITF Kuršumlijska Banja, Serbia	W35	Clay	(Romania) Miriam Bulgaru	7–5, 1–6, 0–6
Loss	14–24	Aug 2025	ITF Kuršumlijska Banja, Serbia	W75	Clay	(Serbia) Teodora Kostović	5–7, 3–6
Win	15–24	Sep 2025	ITF Slobozia, Romania	W50	Clay	(Romania) Elena Ruxandra Bertea	3–6, 6–3, 6–4
Loss	15–25	Sep 2025	ITF Bucharest, Romania	W75	Clay	(Austria) Lilli Tagger	4–6, 6–3, 4–6

=== Doubles: 71 (47 titles, 24 runner-ups) ===
Legend
$50/60,000 tournaments (4–2)
$40,000 tournaments (1–0)
$25,000 tournaments (16–7)
$10/15,000 tournaments (26–15)

Result	W–L	Date	Tournament	Tier	Surface	Partner	Opponents	Score
Loss	0–1	Apr 2012	ITF Heraklion, Greece	10,000	Carpet	(Greece) Despoina Vogasari	(Czech Republic) Martina Borecká (Czech Republic) Petra Krejsová	0–6, 0–6
Loss	0–2	Apr 2012	ITF Heraklion, Greece	10,000	Carpet	(Greece) Despoina Vogasari	(Czech Republic) Martina Borecká (Czech Republic) Petra Krejsová	2–6, 3–6
Loss	0–3	May 2012	ITF Timișoara, Romania	10,000	Clay	(Bulgaria) Dalia Zafirova	(Serbia) Teodora Mirčić (Romania) Andreea Mitu	1–6, 2–6
Win	1–3	Jun 2012	ITF Arad, Romania	10,000	Clay	(Slovakia) Viktória Maľová	(Romania) Alexandra Damaschin (Romania) Patricia Maria Țig	w/o
Loss	1–4	Jun 2012	ITF Niš, Serbia	10,000	Clay	(Russia) Maria Mokh	(Turkey) Hülya Esen (Turkey) Lütfiye Esen	6–3, 6–7^{(2)}, [6–10]
Win	2–4	Jul 2012	ITF Prokuplje, Serbia	10,000	Clay	(Bulgaria) Dalia Zafirova	(Turkey) Hülya Esen (Turkey) Lütfiye Esen	6–3, 6–2
Loss	2–5	Jul 2012	ITF Prokuplje, Serbia	10,000	Clay	(Bulgaria) Dalia Zafirova	(Slovakia) Lucia Butkovská (Russia) Victoria Kan	0–6, 6–2, [7–10]
Loss	2–6	Aug 2012	ITF Pirot, Serbia	10,000	Clay	(Bulgaria) Dalia Zafirova	(Romania) Raluca Elena Platon (Netherlands) Eva Wacanno	2–6, 6–1, [8–10]
Loss	2–7	Oct 2012	ITF Antalya, Turkey	10,000	Clay	(Ukraine) Alona Fomina	(France) Anaïs Laurendon (Czech Republic) Kateřina Vaňková	2–6, 4–6
Win	3–7	Oct 2012	ITF Antalya, Turkey	10,000	Clay	(Ukraine) Alona Fomina	(Italy) Alice Matteucci (Poland) Barbara Sobaszkiewicz	6–0, 6–4
Win	4–7	May 2013	ITF Marathon, Greece	10,000	Hard	(Greece) Despoina Vogasari	(United Kingdom) Laura Deigman (Estonia) Anett Kontaveit	6–4, 2–6, [10–6]
Win	5–7	Jul 2013	ITF Prokuplje, Serbia	10,000	Clay	(Bulgaria) Dalia Zafirova	(Australia) Viktorija Rajicic (Bulgaria) Viktoriya Tomova	6–3, 6–0
Win	6–7	Aug 2013	ITF Brčko, BiH	10,000	Clay	(Bulgaria) Dalia Zafirova	(Bosnia and Herzegovina) Katarina Jokić (Serbia) Nikolina Jović	7–5, 6–1
Win	7–7	Sep 2013	ITF Belgrade, Serbia	10,000	Clay	(Romania) Camelia Hristea	(Serbia) Tamara Čurović (Switzerland) Xenia Knoll	6–0, 6–1
Win	8–7	Sep 2013	ITF Vrnjacka Banja, Serbia	10,000	Clay	(Russia) Polina Leykina	(Slovakia) Rebecca Šramková (Slovakia) Natalia Vajdová	6–4, 6–3
Loss	8–8	Oct 2013	ITF Albena, Bulgaria	10,000	Clay	(Romania) Camelia Hristea	(Netherlands) Eva Wacanno (Bulgaria) Dalia Zafirova	6–4, 2–6, [8–10]
Loss	8–9	Oct 2013	ITF Ruse, Bulgaria	10,000	Clay	(Romania) Camelia Hristea	(Romania) Irina Bara (Netherlands) Eva Wacanno	1–6, 2–6
Loss	8–10	Nov 2013	ITF Antalya, Turkey	10,000	Clay	(Czech Republic) Martina Kubicková	(Romania) Diana Buzean (Romania) Raluca Elena Platon	5–7, 1–6
Win	9–10	Nov 2013	ITF Antalya, Turkey	10,000	Clay	(Moldova) Anastasia Vdovenco	(Romania) Diana Buzean (Romania) Raluca Elena Platon	6–3, 6–2
Win	10–10	Nov 2013	ITF Antalya, Turkey	10,000	Clay	(Moldova) Anastasia Vdovenco	(Romania) Bianca Hîncu (Japan) Kyōka Okamura	6–1, 2–6, [10–7]
Loss	10–11	Jun 2014	ITF Niš, Serbia	10,000	Clay	(Serbia) Marina Lazić	(Australia) Alexandra Nancarrow (Greece) Maria Sakkari	3–6, 0–6
Win	11–11	Jun 2014	ITF Prokuplje, Serbia	10,000	Clay	(Australia) Alexandra Nancarrow	(Turkey) Hülya Esen (Turkey) Lütfiye Esen	6–2, 6–4
Win	12–11	Jul 2014	ITF Prokuplje, Serbia	10,000	Clay	(Australia) Alexandra Nancarrow	(Ukraine) Olga Fridman (Ukraine) Elizaveta Ianchuk	6–4, 7–6^{(5)}
Win	13–11	Jul 2014	Palić Open, Serbia	10,000	Clay	(Ukraine) Elizaveta Ianchuk	(Romania) Irina Bara (Romania) Camelia Hristea	6–4, 6–1
Win	14–11	Aug 2014	ITF Timișoara, Romania	10,000	Clay	(Serbia) Katarina Adamović	(Romania) Raluca Elena Platon (Romania) Cristina Stancu	6–2, 7–5
Loss	14–12	Aug 2014	ITF Arad, Romania	10,000	Clay	(Romania) Camelia Hristea	(Romania) Irina Bara (Romania) Diana Buzean	6–4, 5–7, [6–10]
Win	15–12	Sep 2014	ITF Sofia, Bulgaria	25,000	Clay	(Greece) Despina Papamichail	(Slovakia) Rebecca Šramková (Bulgaria) Julia Terziyska	6–1, 6–4
Win	16–12	Mar 2015	ITF Sharm El Sheikh, Egypt	10,000	Hard	(Spain) Arabela Fernández Rabener	(Russia) Anna Morgina (Bulgaria) Julia Terziyska	6–3, 7–6^{(4)}
Win	17–12	Apr 2015	ITF Sharm El Sheikh, Egypt	10,000	Hard	(Bulgaria) Julia Terziyska	(Poland) Wiktoria Kulik (Poland) Karolina Silwanowicz	6–0, 6–0
Win	18–12	May 2015	ITF Bol, Croatia	10,000	Clay	(Croatia) Tena Lukas	(Moldova) Alexandra Perper (Moldova) Anastasia Vdovenco	6–0, 6–3
Win	19–12	May 2015	ITF Bol, Croatia	10,000	Clay	(Germany) Christina Shakovets	(Switzerland) Karin Kennel (Croatia) Iva Primorac	4–6, 6–2, [10–2]
Win	20–12	Jun 2015	ITF Galati, Romania	25,000	Clay	(Romania) Cristina Dinu	(Romania) Irina Bara (Romania) Diana Buzean	6–4, 6–2
Win	21–12	Jun 2015	ITF Tarsus, Turkey	10,000	Clay	(Turkey) Melis Sezer	(Germany) Nora Niedmers (Germany) Alina Wessel	6–3, 6–1
Win	22–12	Jun 2015	ITF Prokuplje, Serbia	10,000	Clay	(Australia) Alexandra Nancarrow	(Czech Republic) Dominika Paterová (Czech Republic) Vendula Žovincová	6–2, 6–2
Win	23–12	Sep 2015	ITF Vrnjačka Banja, Serbia	10,000	Clay	(Slovakia) Chantal Škamlová	(Serbia) Marina Lazić (Serbia) Bojana Marinković	6–4, 6–0
Win	24–12	Sep 2015	Royal Cup, Montenegro	25,000	Clay	(Turkey) Melis Sezer	(Montenegro) Nikoleta Bulatović (Montenegro) Nina Kalezić	6–0, 6–0
Win	25–12	Sep 2015	ITF Bol, Croatia	10,000	Clay	(Croatia) Mariana Dražić	(Germany) Julia Wachaczyk (Netherlands) Mandy Wagemaker	7–6^{(5)}, 6–3
Win	26–12	Nov 2015	ITF Antalya, Turkey	10,000	Clay	(Croatia) Iva Primorac	(Ukraine) Gyulnara Nazarova (Russia) Aleksandra Pospelova	6–4, 6–3
Win	27–12	Nov 2015	ITF Antalya, Turkey	10,000	Clay	(Croatia) Iva Primorac	(Ukraine) Alona Fomina (Germany) Christina Shakovets	6–4, 4–6, [13–11]
Win	28–12	Jan 2016	ITF Antalya, Turkey	10,000	Clay	(Romania) Ioana Loredana Roșca	(Belgium) Steffi Distelmans (Switzerland) Chiara Grimm	6–2, 6–2
Loss	28–13	Jan 2016	ITF Antalya, Turkey	10,000	Clay	(Romania) Ioana Loredana Roșca	(Slovakia) Viktória Kužmová (Slovakia) Petra Uberalová	6–7^{(3)}, 7–6^{(6)}, [5–10]
Loss	28–14	Feb 2016	ITF Beinasco, Italy	25,000	Clay (i)	(Bosnia and Herzegovina) Dea Herdželaš	(Netherlands) Arantxa Rus (Turkey) İpek Soylu	4–6, 2–6
Loss	28–15	Mar 2016	ITF Hammamet, Tunisia	10,000	Clay	(Bulgaria) Isabella Shinikova	(Austria) Julia Grabher (Hungary) Naomi Totka	7–5, 1–6, [11–13]
Loss	28–16	Jun 2016	Hódmezővásárhely Ladies Open, Hungary	25,000	Clay	(Romania) Irina Bara	(Brazil) Laura Pigossi (Argentina) Nadia Podoroska	3–6, 0–6
Loss	28–17	Jun 2016	ITF Padua, Italy	25,000	Clay	(Romania) Cristina Dinu	(Italy) Alice Matteucci (Poland) Katarzyna Piter	6–2, 6–7^{(1)}, [8–10]
Win	29–17	Jun 2016	Szeged Open, Hungary	50,000	Clay	(Romania) Cristina Dinu	(Poland) Justyna Jegiołka (Argentina) Guadalupe Pérez Rojas	4–6, 6–1, [10–4]
Win	30–17	Jul 2016	ITF Stuttgart, Germany	25,000	Clay	(Argentina) Florencia Molinero	(Russia) Aminat Kushkhova (Czech Republic) Diana Šumová	1–6, 6–1, [10–7]
Win	31–17	Jul 2016	ITF Turin, Italy	25,000	Clay	(Slovenia) Dalila Jakupović	(Italy) Alice Matteucci (Georgia (country)) Sofia Shapatava	6–3, 6–3
Loss	31–18	Sep 2016	Sofia Cup, Bulgaria	25,000	Clay	(Bulgaria) Viktoriya Tomova	(Greece) Valentini Grammatikopoulou (Netherlands) Quirine Lemoine	4–6, 6–4, [6–10]
Win	32–18	Sep 2016	ITF Dobrich, Bulgaria	25,000	Clay	(Bulgaria) Isabella Shinikova	(Germany) Laura Schaeder (Norway) Melanie Stokke	6–7^{(13)}, 6–2, [10–6]
Win	33–18	Sep 2016	Open de Saint-Malo, France	50,000	Clay	(Latvia) Diāna Marcinkēviča	(Romania) Alexandra Cadanțu (Romania) Jaqueline Cristian	3–6, 6–3, [10–8]
Win	34–18	Nov 2016	Open de Valencia, Spain	25,000	Clay	(Kazakhstan) Galina Voskoboeva	(Spain) Alicia Herrero Liñana (Russia) Ksenija Sharifova	6–0, 6–0
Win	35–18	Apr 2017	ITF Pula, Italy	25,000	Clay	(United States) Bernarda Pera	(India) Prarthana Thombare (Netherlands) Eva Wacanno	6–2, 6–3
Win	36–18	Apr 2017	Chiasso Open, Switzerland	25,000	Clay	(Bulgaria) Aleksandrina Naydenova	(Czech Republic) Kateřina Kramperová (Netherlands) Rosalie van der Hoek	7–5, 2–6, [10–7]
Loss	36–19	Mar 2019	ITF Antalya, Turkey	W15	Clay	(Romania) Cristina Dinu	(Russia) Daria Mishina (Kyrgyzstan) Ksenia Palkina	3–6, 6–3, [10–12]
Win	37–19	May 2019	Bredeney Ladies Open, Germany	W25	Clay	(Russia) Anastasiya Komardina	(Russia) Alena Fomina (Czech Republic) Anastasia Zarycká	6–3, 6–3
Win	38–19	Jun 2019	ITF Minsk, Belarus	W25	Clay	(Russia) Anastasiya Komardina	(Belarus) Ilona Kremen (Belarus) Iryna Shymanovich	6–7^{(4)}, 6–4, [10–8]
Loss	38–20	Jun 2019	ITF Ystad, Sweden	W25	Clay	(Russia) Anastasiya Komardina	(United Kingdom) Emily Arbuthnott (Kazakhstan) Anna Danilina	6–3, 2–6, [4–10]
Win	39–20	Jul 2019	ITF Getxo, Spain	W25	Clay (i)	(Russia) Anastasiya Komardina	(Hungary) Vanda Lukács (Switzerland) Nina Stadler	6–3, 7–6^{(4)}
Win	40–20	Aug 2019	Ladies Open Hechingen, Germany	W60	Clay	(Romania) Cristina Dinu	(Serbia) Olga Danilović (Spain) Georgina García Pérez	4–6, 7–5, [10–7]
Win	41–20	Oct 2019	ITF Antalya, Turkey	W15	Hard	(Croatia) Mariana Dražić	(Netherlands) Eva Vedder (Netherlands) Stéphanie Visscher	7–5, 4–6, [10–7]
Win	42–20	Apr 2021	ITF Calvi, France	W25	Hard	(France) Amandine Hesse	(France) Audrey Albié (France) Léolia Jeanjean	7–5, 6–4
Win	43–20	Jul 2021	Telavi Open, Georgia	W25	Clay	(Ukraine) Valeriya Strakhova	(Argentina) Victoria Bosio (Italy) Angelica Moratelli	4–6, 6–4, [10–5]
Win	44–20	Aug 2021	ITF Koksijde, Belgium	W25	Clay	(Ukraine) Valeriya Strakhova	(Greece) Valentini Grammatikopoulou (Russia) Valentina Ivakhnenko	6–4, 6–4
Loss	44–21	Oct 2021	ITF Seville, Spain	W25	Clay	(Croatia) Tena Lukas	(Sweden) Caijsa Hennemann (South Korea) Ku Yeon-woo	5–7, 1–6
Win	45–21	Apr 2022	ITF Santa Margherita di Pula, Italy	W25	Clay	(Netherlands) Eva Vedder	(Croatia) Lea Bošković (Croatia) Tena Lukas	7–5, 6–2
Loss	45–22	Apr 2022	Zagreb Ladies Open, Croatia	W60	Clay	Irina Khromacheva	(Czech Republic) Anastasia Dețiuc (Ukraine) Katarina Zavatska	4–6, 7–6^{(5)}, [9–11]
Loss	45–23	Nov 2022	ITF Heraklion, Greece	W25	Clay	(Bosnia and Herzegovina) Dea Herdželaš	(Romania) Oana Gavrilă (Bulgaria) Lia Karatancheva	4–6, 4–6
Win	46–23	Apr 2023	ITF Split, Croatia	W40	Clay	(Slovenia) Veronika Erjavec	(Slovenia) Nika Radišić (Croatia) Tara Würth	6–1, 6–4
Loss	46–24	Jul 2023	Liepāja Open, Latvia	W60	Clay	(Turkey) Çağla Büyükakçay	(Latvia) Darja Semeņistaja (Latvia) Daniela Vismane	4–6, 6–2, [3–10]
Win	47–24	Aug 2023	Ladies Open Hechingen, Germany	W60	Clay	Alena Fomina-Klotz	(Georgia (country)) Ekaterine Gorgodze (Germany) Katharina Hobgarski	6–2, 6–4

== Fed Cup/Billie Jean King Cup participation ==
=== Singles (15–2) ===
Edition	Round	Date	Location	Against	Surface	Opponent	W/L	Score
2015	Z3 RR	Apr 2015	Ulcinj (MNE)	Namibia	Clay	Lesedi Sheya Jacobs	W	7–6^{(7–1)}, 6–0
2015	Z3 RR	Apr 2015	Ulcinj (MNE)	Moldova	Clay	Anastasia Vdovenco	W	6–0, 6–2
2015	Z3 PO	Apr 2015	Ulcinj (MNE)	Cyprus	Clay	Eliza Omirou	W	6–2, 6–0
2019	Z3 RR	Apr 2019	Helsinki (FIN)	(Republic of the Congo) Congo	Hard (i)	Victoire Mfoumouangana	W	6–0, 6–1
2019	Z3 RR	Apr 2019	Helsinki (FIN)	Kosovo	Hard (i)	Arlinda Rushiti	L	1–6, 6–3, 2–6
2019	Z3 RR	Apr 2019	Helsinki (FIN)	Algeria	Hard (i)	Yassamine Boudjadi	W	6–1, 6–0
2019	Z3 RR	Apr 2019	Helsinki (FIN)	Cyprus	Hard (i)	Raluca Șerban	L	3–6, 2–6
2022	Z3 RR	Jul 2022	Skopje (MKD)	Uganda	Clay	Winnie Birungi	W	6–0, 6–0
2022	Z3 RR	Jul 2022	Skopje (MKD)	Botswana	Clay	Ekua Youri	W	6–1, 6–1
2022	Z3 RR	Jul 2022	Skopje (MKD)	South Africa	Clay	Chanel Simmonds	W	6–2, 6–0
2022	Z3 PO	Jul 2022	Skopje (MKD)	Kosovo	Clay	Adrijana Lekaj	W	6–2, 6–2
2022	Z3 PO	Jul 2022	Skopje (MKD)	Portugal	Clay	Francisca Jorge	W	6–1, 6–1
2023	Z3 RR	Jun 2023	Skopje (MKD)	Albania	Clay	Gresi Bajri	W	6–0, 6–2
2023	Z3 RR	Jun 2023	Skopje (MKD)	Finland	Clay	Anastasia Kulikova	W	2–6, 6–2, 6–4
2023	Z3 RR	Jun 2023	Skopje (MKD)	Iceland	Clay	Sofia Sóley Jónasdóttir	W	6–2, 6–0
2023	Z3 RR	Jun 2023	Skopje (MKD)	Moldova	Clay	Ecaterina Visnevscaia	W	7–5, 6–3
2023	Z3 PO	Jun 2023	Skopje (MKD)	Armenia	Clay	Marina Davtyan	W	6–0, 6–0

=== Doubles (8–2) ===
Edition	Round	Date	Location	Against	Surface	Partner	Opponents	W/L	Score
2015	Z3 RR	Apr 2015	Ulcinj (MNE)	Namibia	Clay	Magdalena Stoilkovska	Lesedi Sheya Jacobs; Lize-Elfrida Moolman	W	6–1, 6–2
2015	Z3 RR	Apr 2015	Ulcinj (MNE)	Moldova	Clay	Magdalena Stoilkovska	Julia Helbet; Alexandra Perper	L	6–7^{(1–7)}, 3–6
2015	Z3 PO	Apr 2015	Ulcinj (MNE)	Cyprus	Clay	Magdalena Stoilkovska	Eliza Omirou; Maria Siopacha	W	7–5, 6–4
2019	Z3 RR	Apr 2019	Helsinki (FIN)	(Republic of the Congo) Congo	Hard (i)	Magdalena Stoilkovska	Gloire Mfoumouangana; Victoire Mfoumouangana	W	6–4, 6–0
2019	Z3 RR	Apr 2019	Helsinki (FIN)	Algeria	Hard (i)	Magdalena Stoilkovska	Inès Bekrar; Yassamine Boudjadi	W	6–1, 6–2
2022	Z3 RR	Jul 2022	Skopje (MKD)	Botswana	Clay	Magdalena Stoilkovska	Chelsea Chakanyuka; Ekua Youri	W	6–1, 6–0
2022	Z3 RR	Jul 2022	Skopje (MKD)	South Africa	Clay	Magdalena Stoilkovska	Ilze Hattingh; Chanel Simmonds	W	3–6, 6–3, 6–3
2022	Z3 PO	Jul 2022	Skopje (MKD)	Portugal	Clay	Magdalena Stoilkovska	Francisca Jorge; Matilde Jorge	L	6–1, 6–1
2023	Z3 RR	Jun 2023	Skopje (MKD)	Finland	Clay	Magdalena Stoilkovska	Laura Hietaranta; Anastasia Kulikova	W	6–4, 6–1
2023	Z3 PO	Jun 2023	Skopje (MKD)	Armenia	Clay	Magdalena Stoilkovska	Marina Davtyan; Irena Muradyan	W	6–3, 6–2
