= 2015 Fed Cup Europe/Africa Zone Group III – Pool D =

International tennis competition

Pool D of the 2015 Fed Cup Europe/Africa Group III was one of four pools in the Europe/Africa Group III of the 2015 Fed Cup. Three teams competed in a round robin competition, with the top team and bottom teams proceeding to their respective sections of the play-offs: the top team played for advancement to Group II.

== Standings ==
		MDA	NAM	MKD	MOZ	RR; W–L	Set; W–L	Game; W–L	Standings
75	Moldova		2–1	2–1	3–0	7–2	14–4	96–50	1
89	Namibia	1–2		0–3	3–0	4–5	8–10	80–74	3
NR	Macedonia	1–2	3–0		3–0	7–2	14–4	94–54	2
NR	Mozambique	0–3	0–3	0–3		0–9	0–18	16–108	4

== Round-robin ==
=== Moldova vs. Mozambique ===
Moldova
3
Bellevue, Ulcinj, Montenegro
14 April 2015
Clay

Mozambique
0

			1	2	3
1	(Moldova) (Mozambique)	Daniela Ciobanu; Marieta de Lyubov Nhamitambo	6; 0	6; 1
2	(Moldova) (Mozambique)	Anastasia Vdovenco; Cláudia Sumaia	6; 1	6; 0
3	(Moldova) (Mozambique)	Julia Helbet / Anastasia Vdovenco; Ilga Adolfo João / Cláudia Sumaia	6; 0	6; 0

=== Namibia vs. Macedonia ===
Namibia
0
Bellevue, Ulcinj, Montenegro
14 April 2015
Clay

Macedonia
3

			1	2	3
1	(Namibia) (North Macedonia)	Kerstin Gressmann; Magdalena Stoilkovska	4; 6	4; 6
2	(Namibia) (North Macedonia)	Lesedi Sheya Jacobs; Lina Gjorcheska	6^{1} 7^{7}	0; 6
3	(Namibia) (North Macedonia)	Lesedi Sheya Jacobs / Lize-Elfrida Moolman; Lina Gjorcheska / Magdalena Stoilkovska	1; 6	2; 6

=== Moldova vs. Macedonia ===
Moldova
2
Bellevue, Ulcinj, Montenegro
15 April 2015
Clay

Macedonia
1

			1	2	3
1	(Moldova) (North Macedonia)	Daniela Ciobanu; Magdalena Stoilkovska	6; 0	6; 0
2	(Moldova) (North Macedonia)	Anastasia Vdovenco; Lina Gjorcheska	0; 6	2; 6
3	(Moldova) (North Macedonia)	Julia Helbet / Alexandra Perper; Lina Gjorcheska / Magdalena Stoilkovska	7^{7} 6^{1}	6; 3

=== Namibia vs. Mozambique ===
Namibia
3
Bellevue, Ulcinj, Montenegro
15 April 2015
Clay

Mozambique
0

			1	2	3
1	(Namibia) (Mozambique)	Kerstin Gressmann; Marieta de Lyubov Nhamitambo	6; 0	6; 2
2	(Namibia) (Mozambique)	Lesedi Sheya Jacobs; Cláudia Sumaia	6; 1	6; 1
3	(Namibia) (Mozambique)	Lesedi Sheya Jacobs / Lize-Elfrida Moolman; Marieta de Lyubov Nhamitambo / Cláudia Sumaia	6; 0	6; 0

=== Moldova vs. Namibia ===
Moldova
2
Bellevue, Ulcinj, Montenegro
16 April 2015
Clay

Namibia
1

			1	2	3
1	(Moldova) (Namibia)	Julia Helbet; Kerstin Gressmann	6; 4	7^{8} 6^{6}
2	(Moldova) (Namibia)	Daniela Ciobanu; Lesedi Sheya Jacobs	1; 6	3; 6
3	(Moldova) (Namibia)	Julia Helbet / Alexandra Perper; Lesedi Sheya Jacobs / Liniques Theron	6; 3	6; 2

=== Macedonia vs. Mozambique ===
Macedonia
3
Bellevue, Ulcinj, Montenegro
16 April 2015
Clay

Mozambique
0

			1	2	3
1	(North Macedonia) (Mozambique)	Marija Elenova; Marieta de Lyubov Nhamitambo	6; 1	6; 0
2	(North Macedonia) (Mozambique)	Katarina Marinkovikj; Cláudia Sumaia	6; 0	6; 4
3	(North Macedonia) (Mozambique)	Marija Elenova / Katarina Marinkovikj; Marieta de Lyubov Nhamitambo / Cláudia Sumaia	6; 1	6; 4

== See also ==
- Fed Cup structure
