= 2013 Fed Cup Europe/Africa Zone Group III – Pool B =

International tennis competition

Group B of the 2013 Fed Cup Europe/Africa Zone Group III was one of four pools in the Europe/Africa Zone Group III of the 2013 Fed Cup. Three teams competed in a round robin competition, with the top team and the bottom two teams proceeding to their respective sections of the play-offs: the top team played for advancement to Group II.

== Standings ==
		(Morocco) MAR	(Denmark) DEN	(Namibia) NAM	RR; W–L	Set; W–L	Game; W–L	Standings
72	Morocco		0–3	3–0	3–3	6–7	53–42	2
82	Denmark	3–0		3–0	6–0	12–0	73–22	1
92	Namibia	0–3	0–3		0–6	1–12	21–73	3

== Round-robin ==
=== Denmark vs. Namibia ===
Denmark
3
Terraten Club, Chișinău, Moldova
8 May 2013
Red clay (outdoors)

Namibia
0

			1	2	3
1	(Denmark) (Namibia)	Marie Jespersen; Liniques Theron	6; 4	6; 2
2	(Denmark) (Namibia)	Mai Grage; Rieke Honiball	6; 0	6; 0
3	(Denmark) (Namibia)	Malou Ejdesgaard / Mai Grage; Rieke Honiball / Liniques Theron	6; 0	6; 0

=== Morocco vs. Namibia ===
Morocco
3
Terraten Club, Chișinău, Moldova
9 May 2013
Red clay (outdoors)

Namibia
0

			1	2	3
1	(Morocco) (Namibia)	Nadia Lalami; Liniques Theron	1; 6	6; 2	6; 0
2	(Morocco) (Namibia)	Fatima El Allami; Rieke Honiball	6; 2	6; 1
3	(Morocco) (Namibia)	Fatima El Allami / Nadia Lalami; Rieke Honiball / Liniques Theron	6; 1	6; 3

=== Morocco vs. Denmark ===
Morocco
0
Terraten Club, Chișinău, Moldova
10 May 2013
Red clay (outdoors)

Denmark
3

			1	2	3
1	(Morocco) (Denmark)	Nadia Lalami; Maria Jespersen	1; 6	6^{4} 7^{7}
2	(Morocco) (Denmark)	Fatima El Allami; Mai Grage	3; 6	1; 6
3	(Morocco) (Denmark)	Nadia Lalami / Lina Qostal; Martine Ditlev / Malou Ejdesgaard	2; 6	3; 6

== See also ==
- Fed Cup structure
