= 2012 Fed Cup Europe/Africa Zone Group III – Pool B =

International tennis competition

Group B of the 2012 Fed Cup Europe/Africa Zone Group III was one of two pools in the Europe/Africa zone of the 2012 Fed Cup. Five teams competed in a round robin competition, with the top two teams and the bottom teams proceeding to their respective sections of the play-offs: the top teams played for advancement to the Group II.

		(Egypt) EGY	(Tunisia) TUN	(Lithuania) LIT	(Moldova) MDA	(Cyprus) CYP	(Namibia) NAM	RR; W–L	Set; W–L	Game; W–L	Standings
72	Egypt		0–3	0–3	3–0	3–0	3–0	3–2	18–16	150–140	3
77	Tunisia	3–0		2–1	3–0	3–0	2–1	5–0	26–5	180–86	1
86	Lithuania	3–0	1–2		3–0	3–0	3–0	4–1	26–5	171–80	2
90	Moldova	0–3	0–3	0–3		2–1	2–1	2–3	10–17	119–170	4
	Cyprus	0–3	0–3	0–3	1–2		2–1	1–4	11–25	132–197	5
	Namibia	0–3	1–2	0–3	1–2	1–2		0–5	8–26	110–189	6

== Egypt vs. Cyprus ==
Egypt
3
Golf El Solaimaneyah Club, Cairo, Egypt
16 April 2012
Red clay (outdoors)

Cyprus
0

			1	2	3
1	(Egypt) (Cyprus)	Menna El Nagdy; Mara Argyriou	6; 4	4; 6	6; 0
2	(Egypt) (Cyprus)	Magy Aziz; Joanna Nena Savva	6; 4	4; 6	6; 3
3	(Egypt) (Cyprus)	Mai El Kamash / Mora Eshak; Maria Siopacha / Andria Tsaggaridou	6; 0	6; 1

== Tunisia vs. Moldova ==
Tunisia
3
Golf El Solaimaneyah Club, Cairo, Egypt
16 April 2012
Red clay (outdoors)

Moldova
0

			1	2	3
1	(Tunisia) (Moldova)	Nour Abbès; Alina Soltanici	6; 3	6; 2
2	(Tunisia) (Moldova)	Ons Jabeur; Julia Helbert	6; 2	6; 1
3	(Tunisia) (Moldova)	Nour Abbès / Ons Jabeur; Melisa Martinov / Alina Soltanici	6; 0	6; 1

== Lithuania vs. Namibia ==
Lithuania
3
Golf El Solaimaneyah Club, Cairo, Egypt
16 April 2012
Red clay (outdoors)

Namibia
0

			1	2	3
1	(Lithuania) (Namibia)	Joana Eidukonytė; Carita Moolman	6; 1	6; 0
2	(Lithuania) (Namibia)	Lina Stančiūtė; Lesedi Sheya Jacobs	6; 1	6; 0
3	(Lithuania) (Namibia)	Justina Mikulskytė / Lina Stančiūtė; Lesedi Sheya Jacobs / Carita Moolman	6; 2	6; 0

== Egypt vs. Namibia ==
Egypt
3
Golf El Solaimaneyah Club, Cairo, Egypt
17 April 2012
Red clay (outdoors)

Namibia
0

			1	2	3
1	(Egypt) (Namibia)	Magy Aziz; Carita Moolman	6; 3	6^{4} 7^{7}	6; 1
2	(Egypt) (Namibia)	Mai El Kamash; Lesedi Sheya Jacobs	6; 1	6; 3
3	(Egypt) (Namibia)	Menna El Nagdy / Mora Eshak; Lesedi Sheya Jacobs / Carita Moolman	6; 4	6; 2

== Tunisia vs. Cyprus ==
Tunisia
3
Golf El Solaimaneyah Club, Cairo, Egypt
17 April 2012
Red clay (outdoors)

Cyprus
0

			1	2	3
1	(Tunisia) (Cyprus)	Nour Abbès; Mara Argyriou	6; 3	6; 4
2	(Tunisia) (Cyprus)	Ons Jabeur; Joanna Nena Savva	6; 2	6; 1
3	(Tunisia) (Cyprus)	Ons Jabeur / Mouna Jebri; Mara Argyriou / Maria Siopacha	6; 1	4; 6	7; 5

== Lithuania vs. Moldova ==
Lithuania
3
Golf El Solaimaneyah Club, Cairo, Egypt
17 April 2012
Red clay (outdoors)

Moldova
0

			1	2	3
1	(Lithuania) (Moldova)	Joana Eidukonytė; Alina Soltanici	6; 2	6; 0
2	(Lithuania) (Moldova)	Lina Stančiūtė; Julia Helbert	6; 2	6; 2
3	(Lithuania) (Moldova)	Justina Mikulskytė / Akvilė Paražinskaitė; Melisa Martinov / Alina Soltanici	6; 0	6; 2

== Egypt vs. Lithuania ==
Egypt
0
Golf El Solaimaneyah Club, Cairo, Egypt
18 April 2012
Red clay (outdoors)

Lithuania
3

			1	2	3
1	(Egypt) (Lithuania)	Menna El Nagdy; Joana Eidukonytė	4; 6	2; 6
2	(Egypt) (Lithuania)	Mai El Kamash; Lina Stančiūtė	2; 6	0; 6
3	(Egypt) (Lithuania)	Magy Aziz / Mora Eshak; Justina Mikulskytė / Akvilė Paražinskaitė	3; 6	1; 6

== Tunisia vs. Namibia ==
Tunisia
2
Golf El Solaimaneyah Club, Cairo, Egypt
18 April 2012
Red clay (outdoors)

Namibia
1

			1	2	3
1	(Tunisia) (Namibia)	Nour Abbès; Liniques Theron	6; 2	6; 2
2	(Tunisia) (Namibia)	Ons Jabeur; Kerstin Gressmann	6; 2	6; 1
3	(Tunisia) (Namibia)	Nour Abbès / Mouna Jebri; Kerstin Gressmann / Liniques Theron	6^{4} 7^{7}	4; 6

== Moldova vs. Cyprus ==
Moldova
2
Golf El Solaimaneyah Club, Cairo, Egypt
18 April 2012
Red clay (outdoors)

Cyprus
1

			1	2	3
1	(Moldova) (Cyprus)	Alina Soltanici; Mara Argyriou	3; 6	7; 5	4; 6
2	(Moldova) (Cyprus)	Julia Helbert; Joanna Nena Savva	6; 1	6; 1
3	(Moldova) (Cyprus)	Julia Helbert / Melisa Martinov; Mara Argyriou / Joanna Nena Savva	6; 3	7; 5

== Egypt vs. Tunisia ==
Egypt
0
Golf El Solaimaneyah Club, Cairo, Egypt
19 April 2012
Red clay (outdoors)

Tunisia
3

			1	2	3
1	(Egypt) (Tunisia)	Magy Aziz; Nour Abbès	3; 6	2; 6
2	(Egypt) (Tunisia)	Mai El Kamash; Ons Jabeur	3; 6	1; 6
3	(Egypt) (Tunisia)	Magy Aziz / Mora Eshak; Ons Jabeur / Mouna Jebri	4; 6	2; 6

== Lithuania vs. Cyprus ==
Lithuania
3
Golf El Solaimaneyah Club, Cairo, Egypt
19 April 2012
Red clay (outdoors)

Cyprus
0

			1	2	3
1	(Lithuania) (Cyprus)	Joana Eidukonytė; Maria Siopacha	6; 3	6; 4
2	(Lithuania) (Cyprus)	Lina Stančiūtė; Joanna Nena Savva	6; 3	6; 3
3	(Lithuania) (Cyprus)	Justina Mikulskytė / Akvilė Paražinskaitė; Joanna Nena Savva / Andria Tsaggaridou	5; 7	6; 2	6; 1

== Moldova vs. Namibia ==
Moldova
2
Golf El Solaimaneyah Club, Cairo, Egypt
19 April 2012
Red clay (outdoors)

Namibia
1

			1	2	3
1	(Moldova) (Namibia)	Alina Soltanici; Kerstin Gressmann	6^{6} 7^{8}	6; 2	7; 5
2	(Moldova) (Namibia)	Julia Helbert; Carita Moolman	6; 2	6; 1
3	(Moldova) (Namibia)	Julia Helbert / Melisa Martinov; Lesedi Sheya Jacobs / Liniques Theron	1; 6	6; 3	3; 6

== Egypt vs. Moldova ==
Egypt
3
Golf El Solaimaneyah Club, Cairo, Egypt
20 April 2012
Red clay (outdoors)

Moldova
0

			1	2	3
1	(Egypt) (Moldova)	Magy Aziz; Melisa Martinov	6; 3	2; 6	6; 2
2	(Egypt) (Moldova)	Mai El Kamash; Julia Helbert	6; 0	6; 2
3	(Egypt) (Moldova)	Menna El Nagdy / Mora Eshak; Julia Helbert / Melisa Martinov	6; 4	7^{8} 6^{6}

== Tunisia vs. Lithuania ==
Tunisia
2
Golf El Solaimaneyah Club, Cairo, Egypt
20 April 2012
Red clay (outdoors)

Lithuania
1

			1	2	3
1	(Tunisia) (Lithuania)	Nour Abbès; Justina Mikulskytė	2; 6	6; 2	7^{8} 6^{6}
2	(Tunisia) (Lithuania)	Ons Jabeur; Lina Stančiūtė	6; 1	6^{5} 7^{7}	6; 0
3	(Tunisia) (Lithuania)	Nour Abbès / Ons Jabeur; Justina Mikulskytė / Akvilė Paražinskaitė	3; 2			retired

== Cyprus vs. Namibia ==
Cyprus
2
Golf El Solaimaneyah Club, Cairo, Egypt
20 April 2012
Red clay (outdoors)

Namibia
1

			1	2	3
1	(Cyprus) (Namibia)	Mara Argyriou; Liniques Theron	7^{7} 6^{5}	6; 2
2	(Cyprus) (Namibia)	Joanna Nena Savva; Lesedi Sheya Jacobs	7^{8} 6^{6}	6; 3
3	(Cyprus) (Namibia)	Maria Siopacha / Andria Tsaggaridou; Kerstin Gressmann / Carita Moolman	6; 4	0; 6	4; 6

== See also ==
- Fed Cup structure
