= 2015 Fed Cup Europe/Africa Zone Group III – Pool C =

Omer dayani is vip Pearson

Pool C of the 2015 Fed Cup Europe/Africa Group III was one of four pools in the Europe/Africa Group III of the 2015 Fed Cup. Three teams competed in a round robin competition, with the top team and bottom teams proceeding to their respective sections of the play-offs: the top team played for advancement to Group II.

== Standings ==
		DEN	NOR	ALG	RR; W–L	Set; W–L	Game; W–L	Standings
73	Denmark		2-1	3–0	5–1	10–2	64–31	1
80	Norway	1-2		2–1	3–3	7–6	60–52	2
92	Algeria	0–3	1–2		1–5	2–11	32–73	3

== Round-robin ==
=== Norway vs. Algeria ===
Norway
2
Bellevue, Ulcinj, Montenegro
14 April 2015
Clay

Algeria
1

			1	2	3
1	(Norway) (Algeria)	Emma Flood; Amira Benaissa	6; 0	6; 2
2	(Norway) (Algeria)	Melanie Stokke; Inès Ibbou	3; 6	7; 5	3; 6
3	(Norway) (Algeria)	Caroline Rohde-Moe / Melanie Stokke; Amira Benaissa / Inès Ibbou	6; 1	6; 4

=== Denmark vs. Algeria ===
Denmark
3
Bellevue, Ulcinj, Montenegro
15 April 2015
Clay

Algeria
0

			1	2	3
1	(Denmark) (Algeria)	Karen Barbat; Amira Benaissa	6; 3	6; 2
2	(Denmark) (Algeria)	Caroline Wozniacki; Inès Ibbou	6; 2	6; 1
3	(Denmark) (Algeria)	Emilie Francati / Mai Grage; Amira Benaissa / Inès Ibbou	6; 0	6; 0

=== Denmark vs. Norway ===
Denmark
2
Bellevue, Ulcinj, Montenegro
16 April 2015
Clay

Norway
1

			1	2	3
1	(Denmark) (Norway)	Mai Grage; Emma Flood	1; 6	3; 6
2	(Denmark) (Norway)	Caroline Wozniacki; Melanie Stokke	6; 3	6; 2
3	(Denmark) (Norway)	Karen Barbat / Mai Grage; Emma Flood / Caroline Rohde-Moe	6; 4	6; 2

== See also ==
- Fed Cup structure
