= 2014 Fed Cup Europe/Africa Zone Group III – Pool A =

Group A of the 2014 Fed Cup Europe/Africa Zone Group III was one of four pools in the Europe/Africa Zone Group III of the 2014 Fed Cup. Three teams competed in a round robin competition, with the top team and the bottom two teams proceeding to their respective sections of the play-offs: the top team played for advancement to Group II.

== Standings ==
		(Estonia) EST	(Armenia) ARM	(Namibia) NAM	RR; W–L	Set; W–L	Game; W–L	Standings
63	Estonia		3–0	3–0	6–0	12–0	73–16	1
85	Armenia	0–3		1–2	1–5	2–10	30–63	3
95	Namibia	0–3	2–1		2–4	4–8	38–62	2

== Round-robin ==
=== Estonia vs. Namibia ===
Estonia
3
Tere Tennis Center, Tallinn, Estonia
5 February 2014
Hard (indoors)

Namibia
0

			1	2	3
1	(Estonia) (Namibia)	Anett Kontaveit; Kerstin Gressmann	6; 2	6; 0
2	(Estonia) (Namibia)	Kaia Kanepi; Lesedi Sheya Jacobs	6; 1	6; 1
3	(Estonia) (Namibia)	Eva Paalma / Tatjana Vorobjova; Lesedi Sheya Jacobs / Liniques Theron	7; 5	6; 2

=== Armenia vs. Namibia ===
Armenia
1
Tere Tennis Center, Tallinn, Estonia
6 February 2014
Hard (indoors)

Namibia
2

			1	2	3
1	(Armenia) (Namibia)	Lusine Chobanyan; Kerstin Gressmann	2; 6	3; 6
2	(Armenia) (Namibia)	Ani Amiraghyan; Lesedi Sheya Jacobs	6; 2	6; 0
3	(Armenia) (Namibia)	Ani Amiraghyan / Milena Avetisyan; Lesedi Sheya Jacobs / Liniques Theron	6^{5} 7^{7}	2; 6

=== Estonia vs. Armenia ===
Estonia
3
Tere Tennis Center, Tallinn, Estonia
7 February 2014
Hard (indoors)

Armenia
0

			1	2	3
1	(Estonia) (Armenia)	Anett Kontaveit; Ani Safaryan	6; 0	6; 0
2	(Estonia) (Armenia)	Kaia Kanepi; Ani Amiraghyan	6; 0	6; 0
3	(Estonia) (Armenia)	Eva Paalma / Tatjana Vorobjova; Lusine Chobanyan / Ani Safaryan	6; 3	6; 2
