= 2014 Fed Cup Europe/Africa Zone Group III – Pool B =

Group B of the 2014 Fed Cup Europe/Africa Zone Group III was one of four pools in the Europe/Africa Zone Group III of the 2014 Fed Cup. Three teams competed in a round robin competition, with the top team and the bottom two teams proceeding to their respective sections of the play-offs: the top team played for advancement to Group II.

== Standings ==
		(Greece) GRE	(Moldova) MDA	(Cyprus) CYP	RR; W–L	Set; W–L	Game; W–L	Standings
69	Greece		2–1	3–0	5–1	10–2	66–29	1
77	Moldova	1–2		3–0	4–2	8–5	55–52	2
88	Cyprus	0–3	0–3		0–6	1–12	36–76	3

== Round-robin ==
=== Greece vs. Cyprus ===
Greece
3
Tere Tennis Center, Tallinn, Estonia
5 February 2014
Hard (indoors)

Cyprus
0

			1	2	3
1	(Greece) (Cyprus)	Valentini Grammatikopoulou; Eliza Omirou	6; 0	6; 0
2	(Greece) (Cyprus)	Maria Sakkari; Maria Siopacha	6; 2	7; 5
3	(Greece) (Cyprus)	Valentini Grammatikopoulou / Agni Stefanou; Atlanta Patsali / Andria Tsaggaridou	6; 2	6; 4

=== Moldova vs. Cyprus ===
Moldova
3
Tere Tennis Center, Tallinn, Estonia
6 February 2014
Hard (indoors)

Cyprus
0

			1	2	3
1	(Moldova) (Cyprus)	Anastasia Dețiuc; Eliza Omirou	6; 1	6; 2
2	(Moldova) (Cyprus)	Daniela Ciobanu; Maria Siopacha	3; 6	6; 4	6; 4
3	(Moldova) (Cyprus)	Anastasia Dețiuc / Julia Helbet; Eliza Omirou / Andria Tsaggaridou	6; 3	6; 3

=== Greece vs. Moldova ===
Greece
2
Tere Tennis Center, Tallinn, Estonia
7 February 2014
Hard (indoors)

Moldova
1

			1	2	3
1	(Greece) (Moldova)	Valentini Grammatikopoulou; Anastasia Detiuc	6; 1	6; 0
2	(Greece) (Moldova)	Maria Sakkari; Julia Helbet	6; 2	6; 1
3	(Greece) (Moldova)	Maria Sakkari / Agni Stefanou; Julia Helbet / Gabriela Porubin	3; 6	2; 6
