= Sandra Andriamarosoa =

Malagasy tennis player (born 1992)

- Country (sports): Madagascar
- Born: 13 April 1992 (age 32); Antananarivo, Madagascar
- Prize money: $4,272

Singles
- Career record: 15–27
- Career titles: 0
- Highest ranking: No. 991 (23 May 2016)

Doubles
- Career record: 10–11
- Career titles: 1 ITF
- Highest ranking: No. 897 (9 May 2016)

Team competitions
- Fed Cup: 4–10

Sandra Andriamarosoa (born 13 April 1992) is a Malagasy former tennis player.

Born in Antananarivo, she competed on the ITF Women's Circuit where she won one doubles title.

Andriamarosoa has been a competitor for the Madagascar Fed Cup team, having made her debut in 2013. She reached a win–loss record of 4–10.

== ITF Circuit finals ==
=== Doubles (1–0) ===
Legend $100,000 tournaments $75,000 tournaments $50,000 tournaments $25,000 tournaments $10,000 tournaments	Finals by surface Hard (0–0) Clay (1–0) Grass (0–0) Carpet (0–0)

Outcome	No.	Date	Tournament	Surface	Partner	Opponents	Score
Winner	1.	12 June 2015	Antananarivo, Madagascar	Clay	(Madagascar) Zarah Razafimahatratra	(South Africa) Madrie Le Roux (Namibia) Liniques Theron	6–3, 6–2
