= 2014 Fed Cup Europe/Africa Zone Group III – Pool D =

International tennis competition

Group D of the 2014 Fed Cup Europe/Africa Zone Group III was one of four pools in the Europe/Africa Zone Group III of the 2014 Fed Cup. Three teams competed in a round robin competition, with the top team and the bottom two teams proceeding to their respective sections of the play-offs: the top team played for advancement to Group II.

== Standings ==
		(Republic of Ireland) IRL	(Malta) MLT	(Iceland) ISL	RR; W–L	Set; W–L	Game; W–L	Standings
75	Ireland		2–1	3–0	5–1	11–2	71–26	1
83	Malta	1–2		3–0	4–2	8–5	59–52	2
–	Iceland	0–3	0–3		0–6	0–12	21–73	3

== Round-robin ==
=== Ireland vs. Iceland ===
Ireland
3
Tere Tennis Center, Tallinn, Estonia
5 February 2014
Hard (indoors)

Iceland
0

			1	2	3
1	(Republic of Ireland) (Iceland)	Jane Fennelly; Anna Soffia Grönholm	6; 1	6; 0
2	(Republic of Ireland) (Iceland)	Amy Bowtell; Hjördís Rósa Guðmundsdóttir	6; 1	6; 0
3	(Republic of Ireland) (Iceland)	Amy Bowtell / Rachael Dillon; Hera Brynjarsdóttir / Sandra Kristjánsdóttir	6; 1	6; 1

=== Malta vs. Iceland ===
Malta
3
Tere Tennis Center, Tallinn, Estonia
6 February 2014
Hard (indoors)

Iceland
0

			1	2	3
1	(Malta) (Iceland)	Elaine Genovese; Hera Brynjarsdóttir	6; 1	6; 1
2	(Malta) (Iceland)	Katrina Sammut; Hjördís Rósa Guðmundsdóttir	6; 3	6; 3
3	(Malta) (Iceland)	Rosanne Dimech / Elaine Genovese; Anna Soffia Grönholm / Hjördís Rósa Guðmundsdóttir	7; 5	6; 4

=== Ireland vs. Malta ===
Ireland
2
Tere Tennis Center, Tallinn, Estonia
7 February 2014
Hard (indoors)

Malta
1

			1	2	3
1	(Republic of Ireland) (Malta)	Jane Fennelly; Elaine Genovese	3; 6	6; 5	2; 6
2	(Republic of Ireland) (Malta)	Amy Bowtell; Katrina Sammut	6; 3	6; 0
3	(Republic of Ireland) (Malta)	Amy Bowtell / Rachael Dillon; Rosanne Dimech / Elaine Genovese	6; 1	6; 1
