= Alexandra Perper =

Moldovan tennis player

- Country (sports): Moldova
- Born: 29 July 1991 (age 34) Moldova
- Plays: Right (two-handed backhand)
- Prize money: $52,945

Singles
- Career record: 181–121
- Career titles: 4 ITF
- Highest ranking: No. 406 (25 June 2018)

Doubles
- Career record: 118–78
- Career titles: 7 ITF
- Highest ranking: No. 385 (30 April 2018)

Team competitions
- Fed Cup: 7–5

Alexandra Perper (born 29 July 1991) is a former professional Moldovan tennis player.

In her career, she won four singles and seven doubles titles on tournaments of the ITF Circuit. On 25 June 2018, she reached her best singles ranking of world No. 406. On 30 April 2018, she peaked at No. 385 in the WTA doubles rankings.

Playing for the Moldova Fed Cup team, Perper has a win–loss record of 7–5.

== ITF Circuit finals ==
=== Singles: 8 (4 titles, 4 runner-ups) ===
Legend $15,000 tournaments $10,000 tournaments	Finals by surface Clay (4–4)

Result	W-L	Date	Tournament	Surface	Opponent	Score
Loss	0–1	Sep 2015	ITF Bucha, Ukraine	Clay	(Russia) Victoria Kan	6–4, 2–6, 0–6
Win	1–1	May 2016	ITF Galați, Romania	Clay	(Romania) Miriam Bulgaru	6–2, 1–6, 7–6^{(7–5)}
Win	2–1	Jun 2016	ITF Galați, Romania	Clay	(Romania) Irina Fetecău	6–2, 7–6^{(7–4)}
Win	3–1	Jul 2016	ITF Iași, Romania	Clay	(Italy) Giorgia Marchetti	6–3, 6–0
Loss	3–2	Jul 2016	ITF Târgu Jiu, Romania	Clay	(Argentina) Julieta Lara Estable	6–4, 4–6, 0–6
Loss	3–3	Sep 2016	ITF Bucha, Ukraine	Clay	(Ukraine) Mariya Koryttseva	0–4 ret.
Loss	3–4	Jul 2017	ITF Focșani, Romania	Clay	(Romania) Nicoleta Dascălu	2–6, 2–6
Win	4–4	Feb 2018	ITF Manacor, Spain	Clay	(Japan) Naho Sato	6–1, 7–5

=== Doubles: 17 (7 titles, 10 runner-ups) ===
Legend $25,000 tournaments $15,000 tournaments $10,000 tournaments	Finals by surface Hard (1–1) Clay (6–9)

Result	W–L	Date	Tournament	Surface	Partner	Opponents	Score
Loss	0–1	May 2015	ITF Bol, Croatia	Clay	(Moldova) Anastasia Vdovenco	(North Macedonia) Lina Gjorcheska (Croatia) Tena Lukas	0–6, 3–6
Win	1–1	May 2015	ITF Galați, Romania	Clay	(Moldova) Daniela Ciobanu	(Germany) Charlotte Klasen (Italy) Anna Remondina	6–2, 3–6, [12–10]
Win	2–1	Dec 2015	ITF Port El Kantaoui, Tunisia	Hard	(Belarus) Darya Chernetsova	(Bulgaria) Isabella Shinikova (United Kingdom) Francesca Stephenson	6–4, 4–6, [10–7]
Win	3–1	Jan 2016	ITF Hammamet, Tunisia	Clay	(Russia) Nika Kukharchuk	(Italy) Anastasia Grymalska (Belarus) Ilona Kremen	6–3, 7–5
Loss	3–2	Feb 2016	ITF Hammamet, Tunisia	Clay	(Greece) Eleni Kordolaimi	(Italy) Anastasia Grymalska (Belgium) Déborah Kerfs	w/o
Loss	3–3	May 2016	ITF Galați, Romania	Clay	(Armenia) Ani Amiraghyan	(Brazil) Maria Fernanda Alves (Argentina) Guadalupe Pérez Rojas	4–6, 6–2, [8–10]
Win	4–3	May 2016	ITF Galați, Romania	Clay	(Moldova) Anastasia Vdovenco	(Brazil) Maria Fernanda Alves (Argentina) Guadalupe Pérez Rojas	6–3, 6–3
Win	5–3	Jun 2016	ITF Galați, Romania	Clay	(Romania) Ioana Loredana Roșca	(Romania) Cristina Adamescu (Romania) Oana Georgeta Simion	6–3, 6–4
Win	6–3	Jul 2016	ITF Târgu Jiu, Romania	Clay	(Moldova) Anastasia Vdovenco	(United States) Quinn Gleason (United States) Melissa Kopinski	1–6, 6–2, [10–8]
Loss	6–4	Sep 2016	ITF Bucha, Ukraine	Clay	(Romania) Mihaela Buzărnescu	(Russia) Valentyna Ivakhnenko (Russia) Anastasiya Komardina	3–6, 1–6
Loss	6–5	Apr 2017	ITF Shymkent, Kazakhstan	Clay	(Ukraine) Veronika Kapshay	(Belarus) Ilona Kremen (Russia) Yana Sizikova	6–7^{(2)}, 1–6
Win	7–5	Jun 2017	ITF Bucharest, Romania	Clay	(Romania) Cristina Ene	(Romania) Elena Bogdan (Romania) Miriam Bulgaru	4–6, 6–3, [10–4]
Loss	7–6	Feb 2018	ITF Manacor, Spain	Clay	(Germany) Lisa Ponomar	(Japan) Yukina Saigo (Japan) Naho Sato	6–3, 5–7, [8–10]
Loss	7–7	Feb 2018	ITF Manacor, Spain	Clay	(Australia) Seone Mendez	(Spain) Irene Burillo (Spain) Olga Parres Azcoitia	4–6, 6–2, [7–10]
Loss	7–8	Sep 2018	ITF Chornomorsk, Ukraine	Clay	(Moldova) Anastasia Vdovenco	(Ukraine) Maryna Kolb (Ukraine) Nadiya Kolb	4–6, 4–6
Loss	7–9	Mar 2019	ITF Cancún, Mexico	Hard	(United States) Dasha Ivanova	(United Kingdom) Emily Appleton (Mexico) María Portillo Ramírez	6–7, 4–6
Loss	7–10	Apr 2019	ITF Osprey, United States	Clay	(Netherlands) Arianne Hartono	(United States) Pamela Montez (Australia) Belinda Woolcock	6–7^{(6)}, 3–6
