= Daniela Ciobanu =

Moldovan tennis player

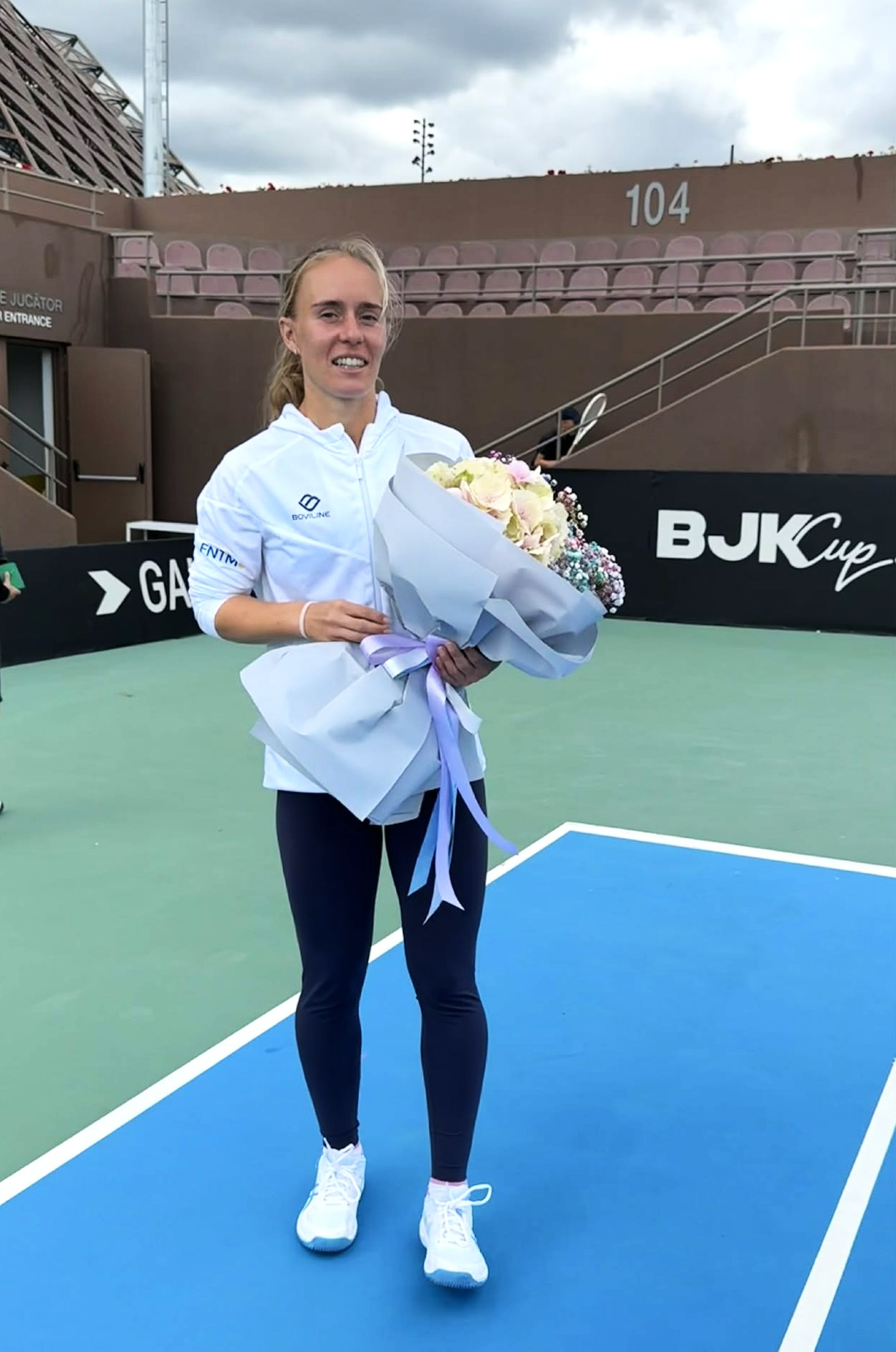
- Country (sports): Moldova
- Born: 9 March 1995 (age 31)
- Plays: Right-handed
- Prize money: $14,556

Singles
- Career record: 93–88
- Highest ranking: No. 710 (15 June 2015)

Doubles
- Career record: 48–62
- Career titles: 1 ITF
- Highest ranking: No. 615 (22 February 2016)

Team competitions
- Fed Cup: 14–10 Singles
- Last updated on: 17 February 2024.

Daniela Ciobanu (born 9 March 1995) is a Moldovan tennis player. She competes in UTR Pro Tennis Tour and plays in German women's team circuit.

She has a career-high singles ranking of world No. 710, achieved on 15 June 2015.

Daniela Ciobanu represents Moldova in the Billie Jean King Cup where she has the most ties played (27), most single wins (14–10) and most years played (9) with best result being the promotion to Group II in 2017.

== ITF finals ==
Legend
$25,000 tournaments
$15,000 tournaments
$10,000 tournaments

=== Singles (0–1) ===
Result	W–L	Date	Tournament	Tier	Surface	Opponent	Score
Loss	0–1	Aug 2014	ITF Telavi, Georgia	10,000	Clay	(Russia) Anastasia Gasanova	3–6, 3–6

=== Doubles (1–2) ===
Result	W–L	Date	Tournament	Tier	Surface	Partner	Opponents	Score
Win	1–0	May 2015	ITF Galati, Romania	10,000	Clay	(Moldova) Alexandra Perper	(Germany) Charlotte Klasen (Italy) Anna-Giulia Remondina	6–2, 3–6, [12–10]
Loss	1–1	Jun 2015	ITF Galati, Romania	10,000	Clay	(Romania) Camelia Hristea	(Romania) Oana Georgeta Simion (Romania) Gabriela Talabă	6–4, 5–7, [8–10]
Loss	1–2	Jul 2016	ITF Focșani, Romania	10,000	Clay	(France) Kassandra Davesne	(Romania) Oana Georgeta Simion (Romania) Gabriela Talabă	7–5, 1–6, [6–10]

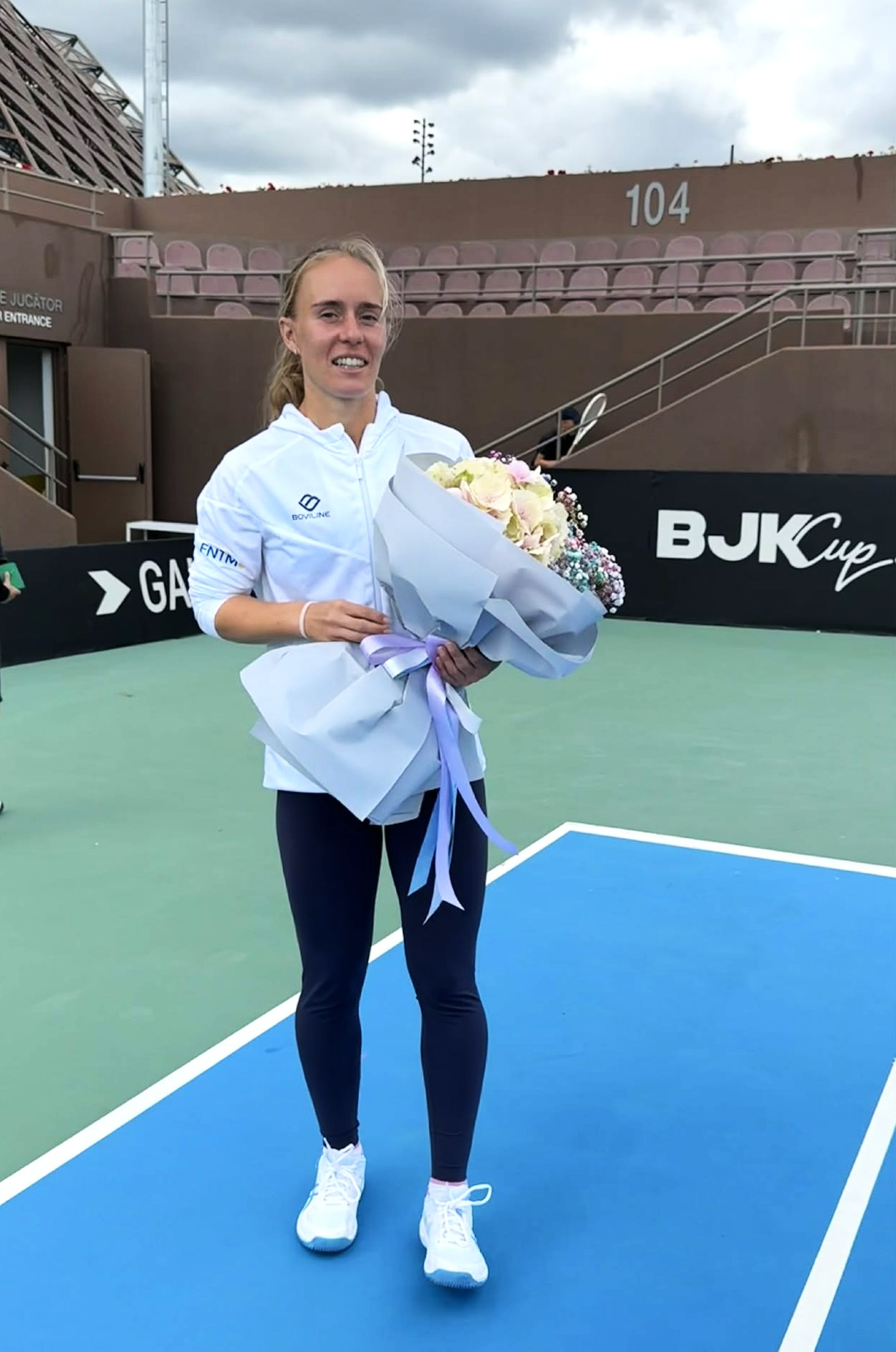
Billie Jean King Cup, Chisinau, 21 June 2025

== ITF Junior Circuit finals ==
Category G1
Category G2
Category G3
Category G4
Category G5

=== Singles (0–3) ===
Result	W–L	Date	Tournament	Grade	Surface	Opponent	Score
Loss	0–1	Jun 2012	Chișinău, Moldova	G5	Clay	(Ukraine) Olga Fridman	5–7, 4–6
Loss	0–2	Sep 2012	Balș, Romania	G5	Clay	(Hungary) Alexa Pirók	7–5, 1–6, 3–6
Loss	0–3	Jun 2013	Chișinău, Moldova	G5	Clay	(Russia) Anastasia Gasanova	1–6, 1–6

=== Doubles (1–3) ===
Result	W–L	Date	Tournament	Grade	Surface	Partner	Opponents	Score
Loss	0–1	Feb 2010	Chișinău, Moldova	G3	Carpet (i)	(Russia) Victoria Kan	(Belarus) Viktoryia Kisialeva (Moldova) Anastasia Vdovenco	7–5, 4–6, [4–10]
Win	1–1	May 2010	Chișinău, Moldova	G5	Clay	(Russia) Victoria Kan	(Moldova) Ana Batiri (Moldova) Iulia Sergheeva	6–3, 7–6^{(7–3)}
Loss	1–2	Jun 2012	Chișinău, Moldova	G5	Clay	(Moldova) Alina Soltanici	(Romania) Madalina Grigoriu (Romania) Elena-Gabriela Ruse	2–6, 0–6
Loss	1–3	Sep 2012	Balș, Romania	G5	Clay	(Moldova) Alina Soltanici	(Romania) Raluca Ciufrila (Romania) Oana Georgeta Simion	5–7, 3–6
