= Melanie Stokke =

Norwegian tennis player

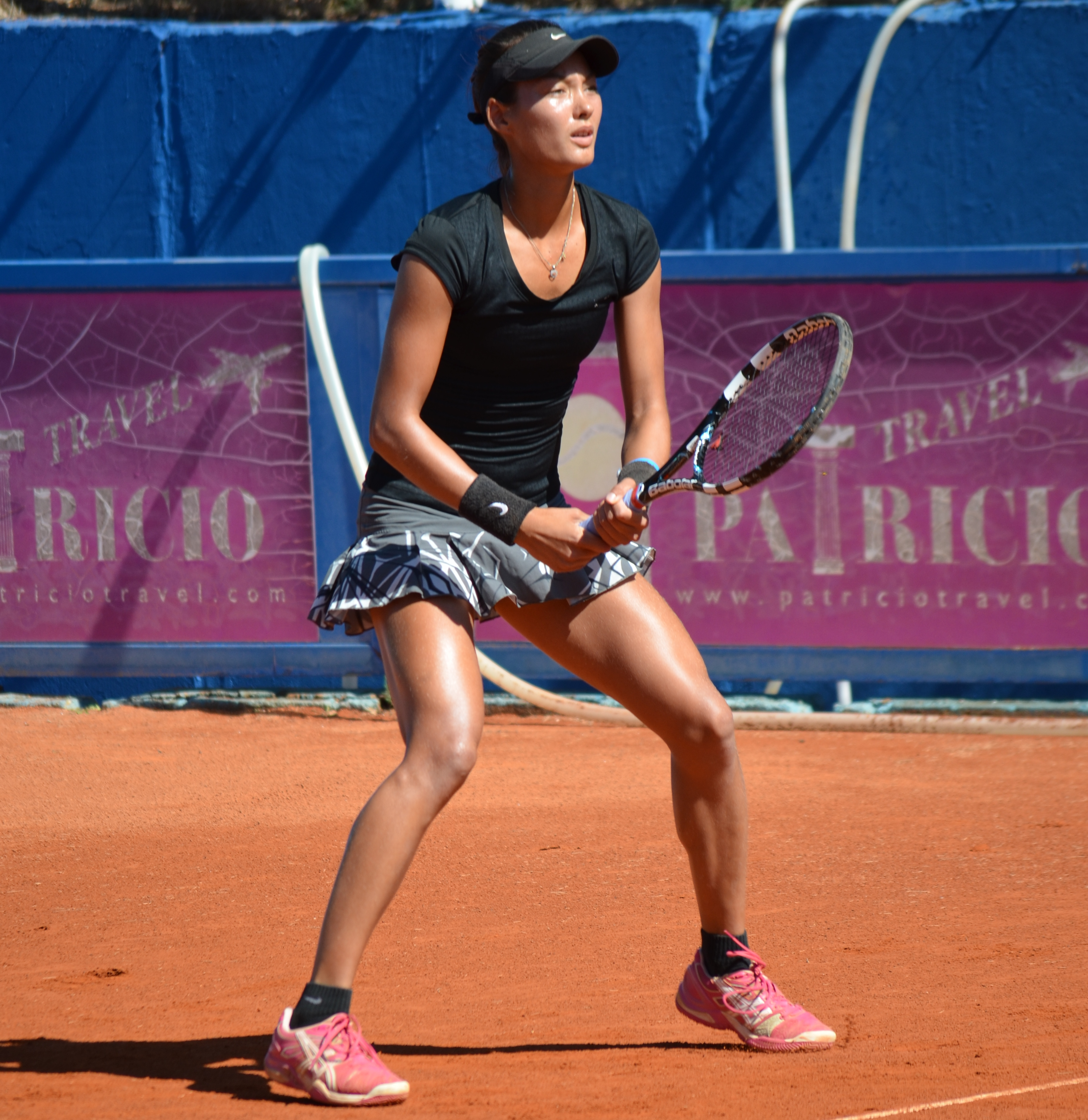
- Stokke in September 2015
- Country (sports): Norway
- Born: 1 October 1996 (age 28); Nordstrand, Norway
- Prize money: US $74,580

Singles
- Career record: 246–163
- Career titles: 0; 4 ITFs
- Highest ranking: No. 261 (30 April 2018)

Doubles
- Career record: 63–81
- Career titles: 0; 3 ITFs
- Highest ranking: No. 348 (30 October 2017)

Team competitions
- Fed Cup: 22–6

Melanie Stokke (born 1 October 1996) is a former Norwegian tennis player.

At the age of 15, she moved by herself to Los Alcázares, in Spain, because she considered the tennis facilities in Norway to not be of a high enough standard.

Stokke has won four singles and three doubles titles on the ITF Circuit. On 30 April 2018, she reached her best singles ranking of world No. 261. On 30 October 2017, she peaked at No. 348 in the WTA doubles rankings.

Playing for the Norway Fed Cup team, Stokke has a win–loss record of 22–6.

She took a break from tennis 2020, due to a perceived lack of support from the Norwegian Tennis Federation.

== ITF Circuit finals ==
=== Singles: 11 (4 titles, 7 runner–ups) ===
Legend $25,000 tournaments $10,000 tournaments	Finals by surface Hard (1–2) Clay (3–5)

Result	W–L	Date	Tournament	Tier	Surface	Opponent	Score
Loss	0–1	Aug 2014	ITF Oldenzaal, Netherlands	10,000	Clay	(Belgium) Steffi Distelmans	7–5, 3–6, 6–7^{(5)}
Win	1–1	Dec 2014	ITF Antalya, Turkey	10,000	Clay	(Slovakia) Chantal Škamlová	7–5, 6–4
Win	2–1	Mar 2015	ITF Port El Kantaoui, Tunisia	10,000	Hard	(France) Lou Brouleau	2–6, 6–2, 6–3
Win	3–1	Sep 2015	ITF Bol, Croatia	10,000	Clay	(Croatia) Iva Primorac	5–7, 6–3, 6–4
Loss	3–2	Nov 2015	ITF Stockholm, Sweden	10,000	Hard (i)	(Denmark) Emilie Francati	4–6, 6–3, 6–7^{(4)}
Loss	3–3	Nov 2015	ITF Oslo, Norway	10,000	Hard (i)	(Norway) Emma Flood	2–6, 4–6
Loss	3–4	Feb 2016	ITF Palma Nova, Spain	10,000	Clay	(Italy) Martina di Giuseppe	6–7^{(5)}, 2–6
Loss	3–5	May 2016	ITF Båstad, Sweden	10,000	Clay	(Switzerland) Patty Schnyder	1–6, 3–6
Loss	3–6	Jun 2016	ITF Madrid, Spain	10,000	Clay	(Switzerland) Tess Sugnaux	4–6, 5–7
Loss	3–7	Jun 2017	ITF Ystad, Sweden	25,000	Clay	(Netherlands) Quirine Lemoine	6–1, 4–6, 3–6
Win	4–7	Sep 2017	ITF Bagnatica, Italy	25,000	Clay	(Italy) Martina Trevisan	7–6^{(6)}, 6–3

=== Doubles: 9 (3 titles, 6 runner–ups) ===
Legend $25,000 tournaments $10/15,000 tournaments	Finals by surface Hard (1–1) Clay (2–5)

Result	W–L	Date	Tournament	Tier	Surface	Partner	Opponents	Score
Win	1–0	Apr 2015	ITF Port El Kantaoui, Tunisia	10,000	Hard	(Portugal) Inês Murta	(Romania) Mihaela Buzărnescu (Ukraine) Olena Kyrpot	6–1, 7–5
Win	2–0	May 2015	ITF Båstad, Sweden	10,000	Clay	(Sweden) Cornelia Lister	(United States) Veronica Corning (Sweden) Maja Örnberg	5–7, 6–3, [10–8]
Loss	2–1	May 2016	ITF Båstad, Sweden	10,000	Clay	(Romania) Irina Bara	(Denmark) Emilie Francati (Sweden) Cornelia Lister	2–6, 4–6
Loss	2–2	Sep 2016	ITF Dobrich, Bulgaria	25,000	Clay	(Germany) Laura Schaeder	(North Macedonia) Lina Gjorcheska (Bulgaria) Isabella Shinikova	7–6^{(13)}, 2–6, [6–10]
Loss	2–3	Feb 2017	ITF Edgbaston, UK	15,000	Hard (i)	(Germany) Julia Wachaczyk	(United Kingdom) Sarah Beth Grey (United Kingdom) Olivia Nicholls	3–6, 7–5, [7–10]
Win	3–3	Mar 2017	ITF Amiens, France	15,000	Clay (i)	(Italy) Camilla Rosatello	(Belarus) Ilona Kremen (Latvia) Diāna Marcinkēviča	6–3, 6–0
Loss	3–4	May 2017	ITF Rome, Italy	25,000	Clay	(Georgia (country)) Ekaterine Gorgodze	(Japan) Eri Hozumi (Japan) Miyu Kato	1–6, 4–6
Loss	3–5	Sep 2017	ITF Bagnatica, Italy	25,000	Clay	(Austria) Julia Grabher	(Italy) Deborah Chiesa (Italy) Martina Colmegna	3–6, 6–4, [6–10]
Loss	3–6	Jul 2019	ITF Torino, Italy	25,000	Clay	(Egypt) Mayar Sherif	(Japan) Chihiro Muramatsu (Japan) Yuki Naito	0–6, 2–6
