= Lina Stančiūtė =

Lithuanian tennis player (born 1986)

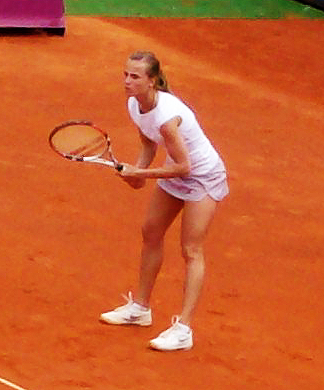
- Stančiūtė at the 2009 Warsaw Open
- Country (sports): Lithuania
- Born: 7 February 1986 (age 40) Vilnius, Lithuanian SSR, Soviet Union
- Height: 1.69 m (5 ft 7 in)
- Turned pro: 2002
- Retired: 2015
- Plays: Right-handed (two-handed backhand)
- Prize money: $150,736

Singles
- Career record: 297–220
- Career titles: 4 ITF
- Highest ranking: No. 197 (28 September 2009)

Grand Slam singles results
- Wimbledon: Q1 (2009)
- US Open: Q2 (2009)

Doubles
- Career record: 81–96
- Career titles: 3 ITF
- Highest ranking: No. 138 (15 May 2006)

Team competitions
- Fed Cup: 37–31

Lina Stančiūtė (born 7 February 1986) is a Lithuanian former tennis player.

In her career, she won four singles titles and three doubles titles on the ITF Women's Circuit. On 28 September 2009, she reached her best singles ranking of world No. 197. On 15 May 2006, she peaked at No. 138 in the doubles rankings.

Playing for Lithuania Fed Cup team, Stančiūtė has a win–loss record of 37–31.

== Personal life ==
Lina Stančiūtė was born on 7 February 1986 in Vilnius, Lithuania. She started playing tennis at age eight, her favourite surface is clay. In June 2016, she married Lithuanian professional Basketball player Martynas Gecevičius.

== Career ==
Stančiūtė had a successful junior career, winning one singles and one doubles ITF Circuit title. Her career-high ranking as a junior was world No. 63, and she finished her junior career with a record of 72–49.

In 2003, she reached her first ITF singles final, winning in Italy. She also reached two ITF doubles finals. In 2004, she won the tournament in Lafayette, United States, endowed with $25k, by beating Karolina Kosińska in three sets.

In July 2015, Stančiūtė announced her retirement from professional tennis.

== ITF finals ==
=== Singles (4–1) ===
Legend $25,000 tournaments $10,000 tournaments	Finals by surface Hard (0–1) Clay (4–0)

Result	No.	Date	Tournament	Surface	Opponent	Score
Win	1.	17 August 2003	Martina Franca, Italy	Clay	(Croatia) Darija Jurak	6–3, 6–1
Win	2.	10 October 2004	Lafayette, United States	Clay	(Poland) Karolina Kosińska	3–6, 6–3, 7–5
Win	3.	23 July 2006	Zwevegem, Belgium	Clay	(Slovakia) Lenka Wienerová	6–1, 6–2
Loss	4.	4 October 2008	Helsinki, Finland	Hard (i)	(Estonia) Margit Rüütel	4–6, 7–6^{(4)}, 6–7^{(7)}
Win	5.	18 June 2011	Kharkiv, Ukraine	Clay	(Georgia (country)) Sofia Shapatava	6–2, 6–1

=== Doubles (3–4) ===
Legend $50,000 tournaments $25,000 tournaments	Finals by surface Hard (1–1) Clay (2–3)

Result	No.	Date	Tier	Tournament	Surface	Partner	Opponents	Score
Loss	1.	15 March 2003	25,000	Kaunas, Lithuania	Hard (i)	(Lithuania) Aurelija Misevičiūtė	(Belarus) Darya Kustova (Ukraine) Elena Tatarkova	1–6, 6–7^{(8)}
Loss	2.	21 June 2003	25,000	Lenzerheide, Switzerland	Clay	(Germany) Claudia Kuleszka	(Ukraine) Mariya Koryttseva (Bulgaria) Dimana Krastevitch	3–6, 2–6
Win	1.	1 October 2005	25,000	Porto, Portugal	Clay	(Romania) Simona Matei	(Netherlands) Kelly de Beer (Netherlands) Eva Pera	2–6, 6–4, 6–4
Win	2.	4 March 2006	25,000	Clearwater, United States	Hard	(Republic of Ireland) Kelly Liggan	(South Africa) Natalie Grandin (South Africa) Chanelle Scheepers	6–3, 6–1
Loss	3.	28 July 2006	50,000+H	Pétange, Luxembourg	Clay	(Luxembourg) Claudine Schaul	(Argentina) Erica Krauth (Portugal) Frederica Piedade	3–6, 3–6
Loss	4.	17 June 2011	25,000	Kharkiv, Ukraine	Clay	(Austria) Melanie Klaffner	(Ukraine) Valentyna Ivakhnenko (Ukraine) Kateryna Kozlova	4–6, 3–6
Win	3.	21 June 2013	25,000	Ystad, Sweden	Clay	(Germany) Kristina Barrois	(Australia) Monique Adamczak (Turkey) Pemra Özgen	6–4, 7–5
