= Ani Amiraghyan =

Armenian tennis player

Ani Amiraghyan Անի Ամիրաղյան
- Country (sports): Armenia
- Born: 9 October 1993 (age 33) Yerevan, Armenia
- Height: 1.68 m (5 ft 6 in)
- Plays: Right (two-handed backhand)
- Prize money: $53,705

Singles
- Career record: 221–131
- Career titles: 1 ITF
- Highest ranking: No. 422 (12 August 2013)
- Current ranking: No. 744 (26 October 2026)

Doubles
- Career record: 89–76
- Career titles: 7 ITF
- Highest ranking: No. 505 (27 June 2016)
- Current ranking: No. 634 (26 October 2026)

Team competitions
- Fed Cup: 32–22
- Last updated on: 4 August 2026.

Ani Amiraghyan (Armenian: Անի Ամիրաղյան; born 9 October 1993) is an Armenian professional tennis player.

Over her career, Amiraghyan won one singles title and seven doubles titles on the ITF Women's Circuit. On 12 August 2013, she reached her best singles ranking of world No. 422. On 27 June 2016, she peaked at No. 505 in the doubles rankings.

Playing for Armenia Fed Cup team, Amiraghyan has an overall win–loss record of 32–22, as of July 2024 (singles 21–10, doubles 11–12).

== ITF Circuit finals ==
=== Singles: 10 (1 title, 9 runner-ups) ===
Legend W50 tournaments W25/35 tournaments W10/15 tournaments	Finals by surface Hard (1–0) Clay (0–9)

Result	W–L	Date	Tournament	Tier	Surface	Opponent	Score
Loss	0–1	Aug 2011	ITF Bagnatica, Italy	10,000	Clay	(Norway) Ulrikke Eikeri	4–6, 4–6
Loss	0–2	May 2012	ITF Istanbul, Turkey	10,000	Clay	(Netherlands) Quirine Lemoine	2–6, 6–7^{(5)}
Loss	0–3	Jun 2012	ITF Campobasso, Italy	10,000	Clay	(Italy) Federica di Sarra	5–7, 2–6
Win	1–3	Sep 2012	Batumi Ladies Open, Georgia	15,000	Hard	(Ukraine) Anna Shkudun	6–1, 6–3
Loss	1–4	Jul 2013	Internazionali di Todi, Italy	10,000	Clay	(Italy) Alice Balducci	4–6, 3–6
Loss	1–5	Jul 2015	ITF Telavi, Georgia	10,000	Clay	(Russia) Anastasia Gasanova	6–1, 4–6, 3–6
Loss	1–6	Sep 2015	Telavi Open, Georgia	10,000	Clay	(Georgia (country)) Ekaterine Gorgodze	7–5, 2–6, 2–6
Loss	1–7	Dec 2015	ITF Antalya, Turkey	10,000	Clay	(Russia) Alisa Kleybanova	4–6, 3–6
Loss	1–8	Jan 2016	ITF Antalya, Turkey	10,000	Clay	(Turkey) Başak Eraydın	6–3, 2–6, 4–6
Loss	1–9	May 2025	ITF Tsaghkadzor, Armenia	W15	Clay	Rada Zolotareva	0–6, 5–7

=== Doubles: 17 (7 titles, 10 runner-ups) ===
Legend W50 tournaments W25/35 tournaments W10/15 tournaments	Finals by surface Hard (1–2) Clay (6–7)

Result	W–L	Date	Tournament	Tier	Surface	Partner	Opponents	Score
Win	1–0	May 2011	ITF Gaziantep, Turkey	10,000	Hard	(Turkey) Başak Eraydın	(Australia) Daniella Dominikovic (Turkey) Melis Sezer	6–2, 6–3
Loss	1–1	Jul 2011	ITF Izmir, Turkey	10,000	Clay	(Russia) Alexandra Romanova	(Russia) Tatiana Kotelnikova (Russia) Eugeniya Pashkova	6–7^{(3)}, 4–6
Loss	1–2	Oct 2011	ITF Yerevan, Armenia	10,000	Clay	(Georgia (country)) Tatia Mikadze	(Italy) Anastasia Grymalska (Ukraine) Anastasiya Vasylyeva	3–6, 3–6
Win	2–2	Jul 2013	Internazionali di Todi, Italy	10,000	Clay	(Italy) Alice Balducci	(Italy) Claudia Giovine (Japan) Yuka Mori	6–2, 6–3
Loss	2–3	Sep 2013	Trabzon Cup, Turkey	50,000	Hard	(Slovenia) Dalila Jakupović	(Georgia (country)) Oksana Kalashnikova (Serbia) Aleksandra Krunić	2–6, 1–6
Loss	2–4	Aug 2014	ITF Telavi, Georgia	10,000	Clay	(Russia) Margarita Lazareva	(Ukraine) Alona Fomina (Germany) Christina Shakovets	4–6, 6–4, [7–10]
Win	3–4	Jul 2015	ITF Telavi, Georgia	10,000	Clay	(China) Chen Chaoyi	(Russia) Anastasia Gasanova (Russia) Adeliya Zabirova	6–3, 6–0
Win	4–4	Jul 2015	ITF Telavi, Georgia	10,000	Clay	(China) Chen Chaoyi	(Russia) Amina Anshba (Russia) Adelina Baravi	6–3, 6–4
Win	5–4	Sep 2015	Telavi Open, Georgia	10,000	Clay	(Russia) Amina Anshba	(Russia) Polina Golubovskaya (Russia) Alina Kislitskaya	6–1, 6–1
Loss	5–5	Apr 2016	ITF Antalya, Turkey	10,000	Hard	(Romania) Daiana Negreanu	(United Kingdom) Harriet Dart (Bulgaria) Viktoriya Tomova	w/o
Loss	5–6	May 2016	ITF Galați, Romania	10,000	Clay	(Moldova) Alexandra Perper	(Brazil) Maria Fernanda Alves (Argentina) Guadalupe Pérez Rojas	4–6, 6–2, [8–10]
Loss	5–7	Aug 2016	ITF Moscow, Russia	10,000	Clay	(Russia) Daria Lodikova	(Russia) Amina Anshba (Russia) Angelina Gabueva	4–6, 4–6
Win	6–7	Nov 2019	ITF Heraklion, Greece	W15	Clay	(Bulgaria) Julia Stamatova	(Romania) Oana Gavrilă (Bolivia) Noelia Zeballos	6–1, 4–6, [10–7]
Loss	6–8	May 2025	ITF Tsaghkadzor, Armenia	W15	Clay	Elina Nepliy	Alina Yuneva; Valeriya Yushchenko	4–6, 6–4, [6–10]
Win	7–8	Nov 2025	ITF Antalya, Turkey	W15	Clay	(Turkey) Ada Kumru	(Romania) Alexandra Anghel; Mariia Masiianskaia	6–3, 6–2
Loss	7–9	Dec 2025	ITF Antalya, Turkey	W15	Clay	(Turkey) Ada Kumru	(Kazakhstan) Asylzhan Arystanbekova (Kazakhstan) Ingkar Dyussebay	7–5, 4–6, [9–11]
Loss	7–10	Oct 2026	ITF Heraklion, Greece	W50	Clay	Elina Nepliy	(Italy) Nuria Brancaccio (Greece) Despina Papamichail	Walkover
