= Norway Billie Jean King Cup team =

Norwegian national women's tennis team

Norway
- Captain: Jørgen Vestli
- ITF ranking: 49 ▲9 (19 April 2022)
- Colors: red & white
- First year: 1963
- Years played: 47
- Ties played (W–L): 145 (65–80)
- Years in World Group: 17 (2–17)
- Best finish: World Group 2R (1964, 1967, 1972, 1974)
- Most total wins: Ulrikke Eikeri (31–19)
- Most singles wins: Ulrikke Eikeri (21–13)
- Most doubles wins: Ulrikke Eikeri (11–6) / Amy Jonsson-Raaholt (11–10)
- Best doubles team: Amy Jonsson-Raaholt / Astrid Sunde (8–6)
- Most ties played: Ulrikke Eikeri (35)
- Most years played: Ellen Grindvold (13)

The Norway women's national tennis team represents Norway in Billie Jean King Cup tennis competition and are governed by the Norges Tennisforbund. They compete in the Europe/Africa Zone of Group I.

== History ==
Norway competed in its first Fed Cup in 1963. Their best result was reaching the round of 16 in 1972 and 1974.

== Current team (2022) ==
- Ulrikke Eikeri
- Malene Helgø
- Melanie Stokke
- Lilly Elida Haseth

== See also ==
- Billie Jean King Cup
- Norway Davis Cup team
