= Armenia Billie Jean King Cup team =

Armenian women's tennis team

Armenia
- Captain: Gayane Movsisyan
- ITF ranking: 90 (13 November 2017)
- Colors: red & blue
- First year: 1997
- Years played: 19
- Ties played (W–L): 58 (24–34)
- Best finish: Zonal Group II RR
- Most total wins: Anna Movsisyan (29–17)
- Most singles wins: Anna Movsisyan (17–7) / Ani Amiraghyan (17–8)
- Most doubles wins: Liudmila Nikoyan (14–2)
- Best doubles team: Anna Movsisyan / Liudmila Nikoyan (8–1)
- Most ties played: Anna Movsisyan (28)
- Most years played: Anna Movsisyan (8)

The Armenia Fed Cup team represents Armenia in Billie Jean King Cup tennis competitions and are governed by the Armenian Tennis Federation. They currently compete in the Europe/Africa Zone of Group III.

== History ==
Armenia competed in its first Fed Cup in 1997. Their best result was finishing third in their Group II pool in 2000 and 2001. Prior to 1991, Armenian players were represented by the Soviet Union.

== Team (2017) ==
- Anna Movsisyan
- Gabriella Akopyan
- Marina Davtyan

== See also ==
- Billie Jean King Cup
- Armenia Davis Cup team
