= Cyprus Billie Jean King Cup team =

Cypriot women's tennis team

Cyprus
- Captain: Nikolas Konstantinou
- ITF ranking: 86 ▼1 (16 November 2015)
- Colors: blue & white
- First year: 1995
- Years played: 11
- Ties played (W–L): 45 (6–39)
- Best finish: Zonal Group II RR
- Most total wins: Eliza Omirou (12-9); Maria Siopacha (12–14)
- Most singles wins: Eliza Omirou (8–3)
- Most doubles wins: Maria Siopacha (5–8)
- Best doubles team: Eliza Omirou / Maria Siopacha (3–3)
- Most ties played: Eleni Pilava Papanikolaou / Maria Siopacha (20)
- Most years played: Maria Siopacha(6)

The Cyprus Billie Jean King Cup team represents Cyprus in the Billie Jean King Cup tennis competition and are governed by the Cyprus Tennis Federation. They have not competed since 2005.

== History ==
Cyprus competed in its first Fed Cup in 1995. They have won one of 30 ties played (vs. Kenya in 1999).

== See also ==
- Billie Jean King Cup
- Cyprus Davis Cup team
