= Namibia Billie Jean King Cup team =

National tennis team

Namibia
- Captain: Mariska Kuschke
- ITF ranking: 90 (14 November 2016)
- Colors: red & white
- First year: 2004
- Years played: 7
- Ties played (W–L): 27 (7–20)
- Best finish: Zonal Group III RR
- Most total wins: Suzelle Davin (6–5); Lesedi Sheya Jacobs (6–13)
- Most singles wins: Elrien De Villiers (4–6)
- Most doubles wins: Suzelle Davin (4–0); Liniques Theron (4–6)
- Best doubles team: Alet Boonzaaier / Suzelle Davin (3–0)
- Most ties played: Elrien De Villiers (11); Liniques Theron (11); Lesedi Sheya Jacobs (11)
- Most years played: Liniques Theron (4)

The Namibia Fed Cup team represents Namibia in Fed Cup tennis competition and are governed by the Namibia Tennis Association. They have not competed since 2015.

== History ==
Namibia competed in its first Fed Cup in 2004. Their best result was fifth in Group III in 2005.

== See also ==
- Billie Jean King Cup
- Namibia Davis Cup team
