= 2012 Al Habtoor Tennis Challenge – Singles =

Singles
- 2012 Al Habtoor Tennis Challenge

Final
- Champion: (Japan) Kimiko Date-Krumm
- Runner-up: (Kazakhstan) Yulia Putintseva
- Score: 6–1, 3–6, 6–4

Events
| Singles | Doubles |
| ← 2011 · | Al Habtoor Tennis Challenge | · 2013 → |

Noppawan Lertcheewakarn was the defending champion, but lost to Stefanie Vögele in the first round.

Kimiko Date-Krumm won the tournament, defeating Yulia Putintseva in the final, 6–1, 3–6, 6–4.

== Seeds ==
1. (Romania) Irina-Camelia Begu (second round)
2. (Serbia) Bojana Jovanovski (second round)
3. (Russia) Nina Bratchikova (quarterfinals)
4. (Slovakia) Jana Čepelová (first round)
5. (Czech Republic) Kristýna Plíšková (semifinals)
6. (Ukraine) Elina Svitolina (quarterfinals)
7. (Switzerland) Stefanie Vögele (second round)
8. (Japan) Kimiko Date-Krumm (champion)

== Main draw ==
=== Key ===
- Q = Qualifier
- WC = Wild card
- LL = Lucky loser
- Alt = Alternate
- SE = Special exempt
- PR = Protected ranking
- ITF = ITF entry
- JE = Junior exempt
- w/o = Walkover
- r = Retired
- d = Defaulted
- SR = Special ranking

=== Finals ===
Semifinals
(China) Zhou Yimiao | 2 | 3
8 | (Japan) Kimiko Date-Krumm | 6 | 6
5 | (Czech Republic) Kristýna Plíšková | 6 | 4 | 6^{3}
(Kazakhstan) Yulia Putintseva | 2 | 6 | 7^{7}

Final
8 | (Japan) Kimiko Date-Krumm | 6 | 3 | 6
(Kazakhstan) Yulia Putintseva | 1 | 6 | 4

=== Top half ===
First round
1 | (Romania) I-C Begu | 6 | 6
LL | (Montenegro) D Kovinić | 2 | 2
(Russia) D Gavrilova | 6^{2} | 6 | 0
(China) Y Zhou | 7^{7} | 4 | 6
SE | (United Kingdom) S Murray | 3 | 4
(Japan) K Nara | 6 | 6
(Thailand) N Lertcheewakarn | 3 | 2
7 | (Switzerland) S Vögele | 6 | 6
4 | (Slovakia) J Čepelová | 3 | 4
(Czech Republic) Ka Plíšková | 6 | 6
Q | (United Kingdom) T Moore | 4 | 2
Q | (Germany) K Barrois | 6 | 6
WC | (Kyrgyzstan) K Palkina | 6 | 0 | 2
PR | (Georgia (country)) O Kalashnikova | 2 | 6 | 6
(Latvia) A Sevastova | 5 | 1
8 | (Japan) K Date-Krumm | 7 | 6

Second round
1 | (Romania) I-C Begu | 2 | 1
(China) Y Zhou | 6 | 6
(Japan) K Nara | 7^{8} | 6
7 | (Switzerland) S Vögele | 6^{6} | 0
(Czech Republic) Ka Plíšková | 4 | 6 | 6
Q | (Germany) K Barrois | 6 | 2 | 2
PR | (Georgia (country)) O Kalashnikova | 2 | 1
8 | (Japan) K Date-Krumm | 6 | 6

Quarterfinals
(China) Y Zhou | 7 | 6
(Japan) K Nara | 5 | 4
(Czech Republic) Ka Plíšková | 6 | 3 | 4
8 | (Japan) K Date-Krumm | 3 | 6 | 6

Semifinals
(China) Y Zhou | 2 | 3
8 | (Japan) K Date-Krumm | 6 | 6

=== Bottom half ===
First round
5 | (Czech Republic) Kr Plíšková | 7 | 6
(Italy) ME Camerin | 5 | 4
WC | (Tunisia) O Jabeur | 3 | 1
Q | (Bosnia and Herzegovina) J Tinjić | 6 | 6
(Thailand) T Tanasugarn | 6 | 6
(Thailand) N Luangnam | 2 | 4
WC | (Croatia) I Mekovec | 3 | 4
3 | (Russia) N Bratchikova | 6 | 6
6 | (Ukraine) E Svitolina | 6 | 6
(Russia) V Dushevina | 4 | 0
Q | (Romania) C Dinu | 6^{4} | 3
(Thailand) L Kumkhum | 7^{7} | 6
LL | (Russia) A Artamonova | 2 | 5
(Kazakhstan) Y Putintseva | 6 | 7
WC | (Switzerland) C Perrin | 6^{4} | 6 | 2
2 | (Serbia) B Jovanovski | 7^{7} | 4 | 6

Second round
5 | (Czech Republic) Kr Plíšková | 6 | 6
Q | (Bosnia and Herzegovina) J Tinjić | 2 | 4
(Thailand) T Tanasugarn | 5 | 6 | 2
3 | (Russia) N Bratchikova | 7 | 3 | 6
6 | (Ukraine) E Svitolina | 7^{7} | 6
(Thailand) L Kumkhum | 6^{5} | 4
(Kazakhstan) Y Putintseva | 6 | 4 | 6
2 | (Serbia) B Jovanovski | 0 | 6 | 2

Quarterfinals
5 | (Czech Republic) Kr Plíšková | 6 | 6
3 | (Russia) N Bratchikova | 2 | 3
6 | (Ukraine) E Svitolina | 7 | 3 | 6^{4}
(Kazakhstan) Y Putintseva | 5 | 6 | 7^{7}

Semifinals
5 | (Czech Republic) Kr Plíšková | 6 | 4 | 6^{3}
(Kazakhstan) Y Putintseva | 2 | 6 | 7^{7}
