= Marinne Giraud =

Mauritian tennis player

- Country (sports): Mauritius
- Born: 23 April 1986 (age 40) Curepipe, Mauritius
- Turned pro: 2003
- Retired: 2009
- Plays: Right-handed (two-handed backhand)
- Prize money: $50,579

Singles
- Career record: 119–95
- Career titles: 4 ITF
- Highest ranking: 237 (15 December 2008)

Doubles
- Career record: 41–44
- Career titles: 3 ITF
- Highest ranking: 291 (12 May 2008)

Marinne Giraud (born 23 April 1986) is a Mauritian former professional tennis player.

She has a career-high singles ranking by the Women's Tennis Association (WTA) of 237, achieved on 15 December 2008, and a career-high WTA doubles ranking of 291, reached on 12 May 2008, making her the No. 1 Mauritian female tennis player.

Giraud first played for Mauritius Fed Cup team in 2007, she has a career win–loss record of 9–6.

Her year-end WTA rankings are as follows: 817th (2004), 618th (2005), 591st (2006), 293rd (2007) and 288th (2008).

== ITF Circuit finals ==
$100,000 tournaments
$75,000 tournaments
$50,000 tournaments
$25,000 tournaments
$10,000 tournaments

=== Singles: 5 (4–1) ===
Result	No.	Date	Tournament	Surface	Opponent	Score
Win	1.	24 October 2005	ITF Pretoria, South Africa	Hard	(South Africa) Alicia Pillay	6–4, 6–2
Loss	2.	9 October 2006	ITF Braga, Portugal	Carpet	(Spain) Eloisa Compostizo de Andrés	4–6, 7–5, 3–6
Win	3.	14 April 2007	ITF Dubai, United Arab Emirates	Hard	(Turkey) Çağla Büyükakçay	6–2, 6–2
Win	4.	14 May 2007	ITF Trivandrum, India	Clay	(Hungary) Ágnes Szatmári	7–5, 6–3
Win	5.	20 May 2007	ITF Mumbai, India	Hard	(India) Rushmi Chakravarthi	7–6^{(7)}, 6–2

=== Doubles 4 (3–1) ===
Result	No.	Date	Tournament	Surface	Partner	Opponents	Score
Win	1.	9 October 2006	ITF Braga, Portugal	Carpet	(Germany) Laura Bsoul	(Spain) Sabina Mediano Alvarez (Spain) Paloma Ruiz-Blanco	6–1, 6–4
Win	2.	20 May 2007	ITF Mumbai, India	Hard	(India) Isha Lakhani	(India) Ankita Bhambri (India) Sanaa Bhambri	6–4, 6–1
Win	3.	22 October 2007	ITF Saint-Denis, France	Hard	(Serbia) Teodora Mirčić	(France) Florence Haring (France) Virginie Pichet	6–2, 7–5
Loss	4.	2 June 2008	ITF Grado, Spain	Hard	(Australia) Christina Wheeler	(Colombia) Mariana Duque-Marino (Austria) Melanie Klaffner	1–6, 2–6

== Fed Cup ==
=== Singles: 8 (6 wins, 2 losses) ===
Result	W–L	Date	Tournament	Group	Surface	Team	Opponent	Score
Win	1–0	Apr 2007	2007 Fed Cup Europe/Africa Zone	Group III	Hard	Egypt	(Egypt) Magy Aziz	6–2, 6–0
Loss	1–1	Apr 2007	2007 Fed Cup Europe/Africa Zone	Group III	Hard	Liechtenstein	(Liechtenstein) Stephanie Vogt	4–6, 4–6
Win	2–1	Apr 2007	2007 Fed Cup Europe/Africa Zone	Group III	Hard	Turkey	(Turkey) Pemra Özgen	6–1, 6–2
Win	3–1	Apr 2007	2007 Fed Cup Europe/Africa Zone	Group III	Hard	Azerbaijan	(Azerbaijan) Sevil Aliyeva	w/o
Win	4–1	Apr 2008	2008 Fed Cup Europe/Africa Zone	Group III	Clay	Norway	(Norway) Helene Auensen	6–2, 6–4
Win	5–1	Apr 2008	2008 Fed Cup Europe/Africa Zone	Group III	Clay	Iceland	(Iceland) Soumia Islami	6–1, 6–0
Win	6–1	Apr 2008	2008 Fed Cup Europe/Africa Zone	Group III	Clay	Zimbabwe	(Zimbabwe) Charlene Tsangamwe	6–1, 6–0
Loss	6–2	Apr 2008	2008 Fed Cup Europe/Africa Zone	Group III	Clay	Latvia	(Latvia) Anastasija Sevastova	6–5 ret.

=== Doubles: 7 (3 wins, 4 losses) ===
Result	W–L	Date	Tournament	Group	Surface	Partner	Team	Opponents	Score	
Win	1–0	Apr 2007	Fed Cup Europe/Africa Zone	Group III	Hard	(Mauritius) Astrid Tixier	Egypt	(Egypt) Magy Aziz	(Egypt) Aliaa Fakhry	6–2, 6–2
Loss	1–1	Apr 2007	Fed Cup Europe/Africa Zone	Group III	Hard	(Mauritius) Astrid Tixier	Liechtenstein	(Liechtenstein) Marina Novak	(Liechtenstein) Stephanie Vogt	6–7^{(3)}, 6–7^{(6)}
Loss	1–2	Apr 2007	Fed Cup Europe/Africa Zone	Group III	Hard	(Mauritius) Astrid Tixier	Turkey	(Turkey) Pemra Özgen	(Turkey) İpek Şenoğlu	3–6, 2–6
Win	2–2	Apr 2007	Fed Cup Europe/Africa Zone	Group III	Hard	(Mauritius) Astrid Tixier	Azerbaijan	(Azerbaijan) Shukufa Abdullayeva	(Azerbaijan) Sevil Aliyeva	w/o
Loss	2–3	Apr 2008	Fed Cup Europe/Africa Zone	Group III	Clay	(Mauritius) Astrid Tixier	Norway	(Norway) Helene Auensen	(Norway) Emma Flood	6–2, 1–6, 3–6
Win	3–3	Apr 2008	Fed Cup Europe/Africa Zone	Group III	Clay	(Mauritius) Astrid Tixier	Zimbabwe	(Zimbabwe) Denise Atzinger	(Zimbabwe) Charlene Tsangamwe	6–3, 6–2
Loss	3–4	Apr 2008	Fed Cup Europe/Africa Zone	Group III	Clay	(Mauritius) Astrid Tixier	Latvia	(Latvia) Diāna Bukājeva	(Latvia) Anastasija Sevastova	w/o
