= 2012 Al Habtoor Tennis Challenge – Doubles =

Doubles
- 2012 Al Habtoor Tennis Challenge

Final
- Champions: (Italy) Maria Elena Camerin (Russia) Vera Dushevina
- Runners-up: (Czech Republic) Eva Hrdinová (Czech Republic) Karolína Plíšková
- Score: 7–5, 6–3

Events
Singles	Doubles
← 2011 ·	Al Habtoor Tennis Challenge	· 2013 →

Nina Bratchikova and Darija Jurak were the defending champions. Jurak decided not to defend her title. Bratchikova teamed up with Vladimíra Uhlířová as the top seeds, but they lost to Eva Hrdinová and Karolína Plíšková in the quarterfinals after retiring in the second set.

Maria Elena Camerin and Vera Dushevina won the tournament, defeating the Czech pairing of Hrdinová and Plíšková in the final, 7–5, 6–3.

== Seeds ==
1. (Russia) Nina Bratchikova / (Czech Republic) Vladimíra Uhlířová (quarterfinals; retired)
2. (Georgia (country)) Oksana Kalashnikova / (Thailand) Tamarine Tanasugarn (quarterfinals)
3. (Germany) Kristina Barrois / (Austria) Sandra Klemenschits (semifinals)
4. (Uzbekistan) Akgul Amanmuradova / (Russia) Arina Rodionova (quarterfinals; withdrew)

== Draw ==
=== Key ===
- Q = Qualifier
- WC = Wild card
- LL = Lucky loser
- Alt = Alternate
- SE = Special exempt
- PR = Protected ranking
- ITF = ITF entry
- JE = Junior exempt
- w/o = Walkover
- r = Retired
- d = Defaulted
- SR = Special ranking

First round
1	(Russia) N Bratchikova (Czech Republic) V Uhlířová	7	6
WC	(Hungary) K Nagy (Bosnia and Herzegovina) J Tinjić	5	2
(Czech Republic) E Hrdinová (Czech Republic) Ka Plíšková	6	6
WC	(Armenia) A Amiraghyan (Tunisia) O Jabeur	2	0
4	(Uzbekistan) A Amanmuradova (Russia) A Rodionova	5	6	[10]
(Ukraine) I Buryachok (Switzerland) A Sadiković	7	2	[6]
(Thailand) N Lertcheewakarn (China) Y Zhou	6	6
Alt	(Romania) C Dinu (Montenegro) D Kovinić	4	1
(Canada) G Dabrowski (Czech Republic) Kr Plíšková	6	6
(Uzbekistan) N Abduraimova (Russia) E Yashina	1	3
WC	(Oman) F Al Nabhani (Serbia) B Jovanovski	1	1
3	(Germany) K Barrois (Austria) S Klemenschits	6	6
(Italy) ME Camerin (Russia) V Dushevina	6	6
(Kyrgyzstan) K Palkina (Austria) N Rottmann	4	0
(United Kingdom) S Murray (United Kingdom) E Webley-Smith	1	1
2	(Georgia (country)) O Kalashnikova (Thailand) T Tanasugarn	6	6

Quarterfinals
1	(Russia) N Bratchikova (Czech Republic) V Uhlířová	6^{2}	3^{r}
(Czech Republic) E Hrdinová (Czech Republic) Ka Plíšková	7^{7}	3
4	(Uzbekistan) A Amanmuradova (Russia) A Rodionova
(Thailand) N Lertcheewakarn (China) Y Zhou	w/o
(Canada) G Dabrowski (Czech Republic) Kr Plíšková	3	3
3	(Germany) K Barrois (Austria) S Klemenschits	6	6
(Italy) ME Camerin (Russia) V Dushevina	6	6^{1}	[10]
2	(Georgia (country)) O Kalashnikova (Thailand) T Tanasugarn	3	7^{7}	[4]

Semifinals
(Czech Republic) E Hrdinová (Czech Republic) Ka Plíšková	6	3	[10]
(Thailand) N Lertcheewakarn (China) Y Zhou	2	6	[4]
3	(Germany) K Barrois (Austria) S Klemenschits	5	5
(Italy) ME Camerin (Russia) V Dushevina	7	7

Final
(Czech Republic) E Hrdinová (Czech Republic) Ka Plíšková	5	3
(Italy) ME Camerin (Russia) V Dushevina	7	6
