= 2012 Al Habtoor Tennis Challenge =

- Date: 26 November–2 December
- Edition: 14th
- Category: ITF Women's Circuit
- Prize money: $75,000
- Surface: Hard
- Location: Dubai, United Arab Emirates

Champions

Singles
- (Japan) Kimiko Date-Krumm

Doubles
- (Italy) Maria Elena Camerin (Russia) Vera Dushevina
← 2011 ·	Al Habtoor Tennis Challenge	· 2013 →

The 2012 Al Habtoor Tennis Challenge was a professional tennis tournament played on outdoor hard courts. It was the 14th edition of the tournament which was part of the 2012 ITF Women's Circuit, offering a total of $75,000 in prize money. It took place in Dubai, United Arab Emirates, on 26 November–2 December 2012.

== Singles entrants ==
=== Seeds ===
Country	Player	Rank^{1}	Seed
ROU	Irina-Camelia Begu	52	1
SRB	Bojana Jovanovski	56	2
RUS	Nina Bratchikova	85	3
SVK	Jana Čepelová	106	4
CZE	Kristýna Plíšková	109	5
UKR	Elina Svitolina	114	6
SUI	Stefanie Vögele	116	7
JPN	Kimiko Date-Krumm	120	8

- ^{1} Rankings as of 19 November 2012

=== Other entrants ===
The following players received wildcards into the singles main draw:

- (Tunisia) Ons Jabeur
- (Croatia) Iva Mekovec
- (Kyrgyzstan) Ksenia Palkina
- (Switzerland) Conny Perrin

The following players received entry from the qualifying draw:

- (Germany) Kristina Barrois
- (Romania) Cristina Dinu
- (United Kingdom) Tara Moore
- (Bosnia and Herzegovina) Jasmina Tinjić

The following players received entry into the singles main draw as Lucky Losers:

- (Russia) Alexandra Artamonova
- (Montenegro) Danka Kovinić

The following player received entry by a Protected Ranking:

- (Georgia (country)) Oksana Kalashnikova

The following player received entry by a Special Exempt:

- (United Kingdom) Samantha Murray

== Champions ==
=== Singles ===
- (Japan) Kimiko Date-Krumm def. (Kazakhstan) Yulia Putintseva 6–1, 3–6, 6–4

=== Doubles ===
- (Italy) Maria Elena Camerin / (Russia) Vera Dushevina def. (Czech Republic) Eva Hrdinová / (Czech Republic) Karolína Plíšková 7–5, 6–3
