= 2011 Al Habtoor Tennis Challenge – Singles =

Singles
- 2011 Al Habtoor Tennis Challenge

Final
- Champion: (Thailand) Noppawan Lertcheewakarn
- Runner-up: (France) Kristina Mladenovic
- Score: 7–5, 6–4

Events
Singles	Doubles
← 2010 ·	Al Habtoor Tennis Challenge	· 2012 →

Sania Mirza was the defending champion, but decided not to participate this year.

Noppawan Lertcheewakarn won the title defeating Kristina Mladenovic in the final 7–5, 6–4.

== Seeds ==
1. (Romania) Simona Halep (semifinals)
2. (Belarus) Anastasiya Yakimova (first round)
3. (Serbia) Bojana Jovanovski (second round)
4. (Romania) Alexandra Dulgheru (second round)
5. (France) Mathilde Johansson (second round)
6. (Netherlands) Arantxa Rus (semifinals)
7. (Russia) Evgeniya Rodina (second round)
8. (Romania) Alexandra Cadanțu (second round)

== Draw ==
=== Key ===
- Q = Qualifier
- WC = Wild card
- LL = Lucky loser
- Alt = Alternate
- SE = Special exempt
- PR = Protected ranking
- ITF = ITF entry
- JE = Junior exempt
- w/o = Walkover
- r = Retired
- d = Defaulted
- SR = Special ranking

=== Finals ===
Semifinals
1	(Romania) Simona Halep	4	5
(Thailand) Noppawan Lertcheewakarn	6	7
(France) Kristina Mladenovic	6	6
6	(Netherlands) Arantxa Rus	2	1

Final
(Thailand) Noppawan Lertcheewakarn	7	6
(France) Kristina Mladenovic	5	4

=== Top half ===
First round
1	(Romania) S Halep	6	6
Q	(United Kingdom) T Moore	1	4
(Thailand) T Tanasugarn	6	6
(Russia) M Sirotkina	2	3
(Belarus) O Govortsova	7	6
Q	(Uzbekistan) N Abduraimova	5	3
(Romania) M Buzărnescu	5	6^{1}
8	(Romania) A Cadanțu	7	7^{7}
3	(Serbia) B Jovanovski	6	6
(Ukraine) M Koryttseva	4	2
(Thailand) N Lertcheewakarn	6	6
WC	(Croatia) D Jurak	3	3
Q	(Slovenia) N Kolar	4	4
(Russia) R Kulikova	6	6
Q	(Bosnia and Herzegovina) J Tinjić	3	6	3
5	(France) M Johansson	6	1	6

Second round
1	(Romania) S Halep	6	6
(Thailand) T Tanasugarn	4	3
(Belarus) O Govortsova	6	6
8	(Romania) A Cadanțu	2	3
3	(Serbia) B Jovanovski	5	4
(Thailand) N Lertcheewakarn	7	6
(Russia) R Kulikova	7	7^{7}
5	(France) M Johansson	5	6^{4}

Quarter Finals
1	(Romania) S Halep	4	6	6
(Belarus) O Govortsova	6	4	4
(Thailand) N Lertcheewakarn	6	6
(Russia) R Kulikova	0	3

Semi Final
1	(Romania) S Halep	4	5
(Thailand) N Lertcheewakarn	6	7

=== Bottom half ===
First round
7	(Russia) E Rodina	5	7^{7}	6
(Italy) ME Camerin	7	6^{2}	2
(France) K Mladenovic	6	4	6
(Thailand) V Wongteanchai	1	6	4
(Poland) U Radwańska	6	6
(Italy) C Dentoni	0	0
WC	(Oman) F Al Nabhani	6^{6}	0
4	(Romania) A Dulgheru	7^{8}	6
6	(Netherlands) A Rus	6	6
(Japan) E Sema	4	3
(France) C Garcia	4	6	3
WC	(Switzerland) C Perrin	6	1	6
WC	(United Kingdom) E Webley-Smith	1	6	3
(Uzbekistan) A Amanmuradova	6	2	6
(Russia) N Bratchikova	6	6
2	(Belarus) A Yakimova	0	1

Second round
7	(Russia) E Rodina	6	1	4
(France) K Mladenovic	4	6	6
(Poland) U Radwańska	6	6
4	(Romania) A Dulgheru	3	1
6	(Netherlands) A Rus	6^{3}	7	6
WC	(Switzerland) C Perrin	7^{7}	5	4
(Uzbekistan) A Amanmuradova	7	6
(Russia) N Bratchikova	5	3

Quarter Finals
(France) K Mladenovic	7	2	6
(Poland) U Radwańska	5	6	0
6	(Netherlands) A Rus	6	6
(Uzbekistan) A Amanmuradova	2	4

Semi Final
(France) K Mladenovic	6	6
6	(Netherlands) A Rus	2	1
