= 2011 Al Habtoor Tennis Challenge – Doubles =

Doubles
- 2011 Al Habtoor Tennis Challenge

Final
- Champions: (Russia) Nina Bratchikova (Croatia) Darija Jurak
- Runners-up: (Uzbekistan) Akgul Amanmuradova (Romania) Alexandra Dulgheru
- Score: 6–4, 3–6, [10–6]

Events
Singles	Doubles
← 2010 ·	Al Habtoor Tennis Challenge	· 2012 →

Julia Görges and Petra Martić were the defending champions, but both chose not to participate.

Nina Bratchikova and Darija Jurak won the title defeating Akgul Amanmuradova and Alexandra Dulgheru in the final 6–4, 3–6, [10–6].

== Seeds ==
1. (Uzbekistan) Akgul Amanmuradova / (Romania) Alexandra Dulgheru (final)
2. (Russia) Nina Bratchikova / (Croatia) Darija Jurak (champions)
3. (Slovenia) Andreja Klepač / (Poland) Urszula Radwańska (semifinals)
4. (Thailand) Noppawan Lertcheewakarn / (Thailand) Varatchaya Wongteanchai (semifinals)

== Draw ==
=== Key ===
- Q = Qualifier
- WC = Wild card
- LL = Lucky loser
- Alt = Alternate
- SE = Special exempt
- PR = Protected ranking
- ITF = ITF entry
- JE = Junior exempt
- w/o = Walkover
- r = Retired
- d = Defaulted
- SR = Special ranking

=== Draw ===
First round
1	(Uzbekistan) A Amanmuradova (Romania) A Dulgheru	6	6
(Romania) S Halep (Slovakia) J Husárová	1	4
(Germany) V Heisen (Slovakia) H Nagyová	4	1
(Russia) E Rodina (Russia) M Sirotkina	6	6
3	(Slovenia) A Klepač (Poland) U Radwańska	6	6
(Oman) F Al Nabhani (Hungary) K Nagy	4	1
(Switzerland) C Perrin (United Kingdom) E Webley-Smith	5	6	[3]
(Romania) M Buzărnescu (Serbia) T Mirčić	7	3	[10]
(Serbia) B Jovanovski (Ukraine) M Koryttseva	2	6	[9]
(Romania) A Cadanțu (China) X Han	6	4	[11]
(Luxembourg) A Kremer (France) K Mladenovic	6^{2}	6^{5}
4	(Thailand) N Lertcheewakarn (Thailand) V Wongteanchai	7^{7}	7^{7}
(Netherlands) A Rus (Belarus) A Yakimova	7^{7}	3	[10]
(Italy) ME Camerin (Italy) C Dentoni	6^{5}	6	[5]
(United Kingdom) T Moore (Bosnia and Herzegovina) J Tinjić	2	5
2	(Russia) N Bratchikova (Croatia) D Jurak	6	7

Quarterfinals
1	(Uzbekistan) A Amanmuradova (Romania) A Dulgheru	5	7^{7}	[10]
(Russia) E Rodina (Russia) M Sirotkina	7	6^{3}	[1]
3	(Slovenia) A Klepač (Poland) U Radwańska	7	6
(Romania) M Buzărnescu (Serbia) T Mirčić	5	2
(Romania) A Cadanțu (China) X Han	6	4	[2]
4	(Thailand) N Lertcheewakarn (Thailand) V Wongteanchai	4	6	[10]
(Netherlands) A Rus (Belarus) A Yakimova	6^{5}	7	[6]
2	(Russia) N Bratchikova (Croatia) D Jurak	7^{7}	5	[10]

Semifinals
1	(Uzbekistan) A Amanmuradova (Romania) A Dulgheru	6	7
3	(Slovenia) A Klepač (Poland) U Radwańska	4	5
4	(Thailand) N Lertcheewakarn (Thailand) V Wongteanchai	6^{12}	0
2	(Russia) N Bratchikova (Croatia) D Jurak	7^{14}	6

Finals
1	(Uzbekistan) A Amanmuradova (Romania) A Dulgheru	4	6	[6]
2	(Russia) N Bratchikova (Croatia) D Jurak	6	3	[10]
