= Ulrikke Eikeri =

Norwegian tennis player (born 1992)

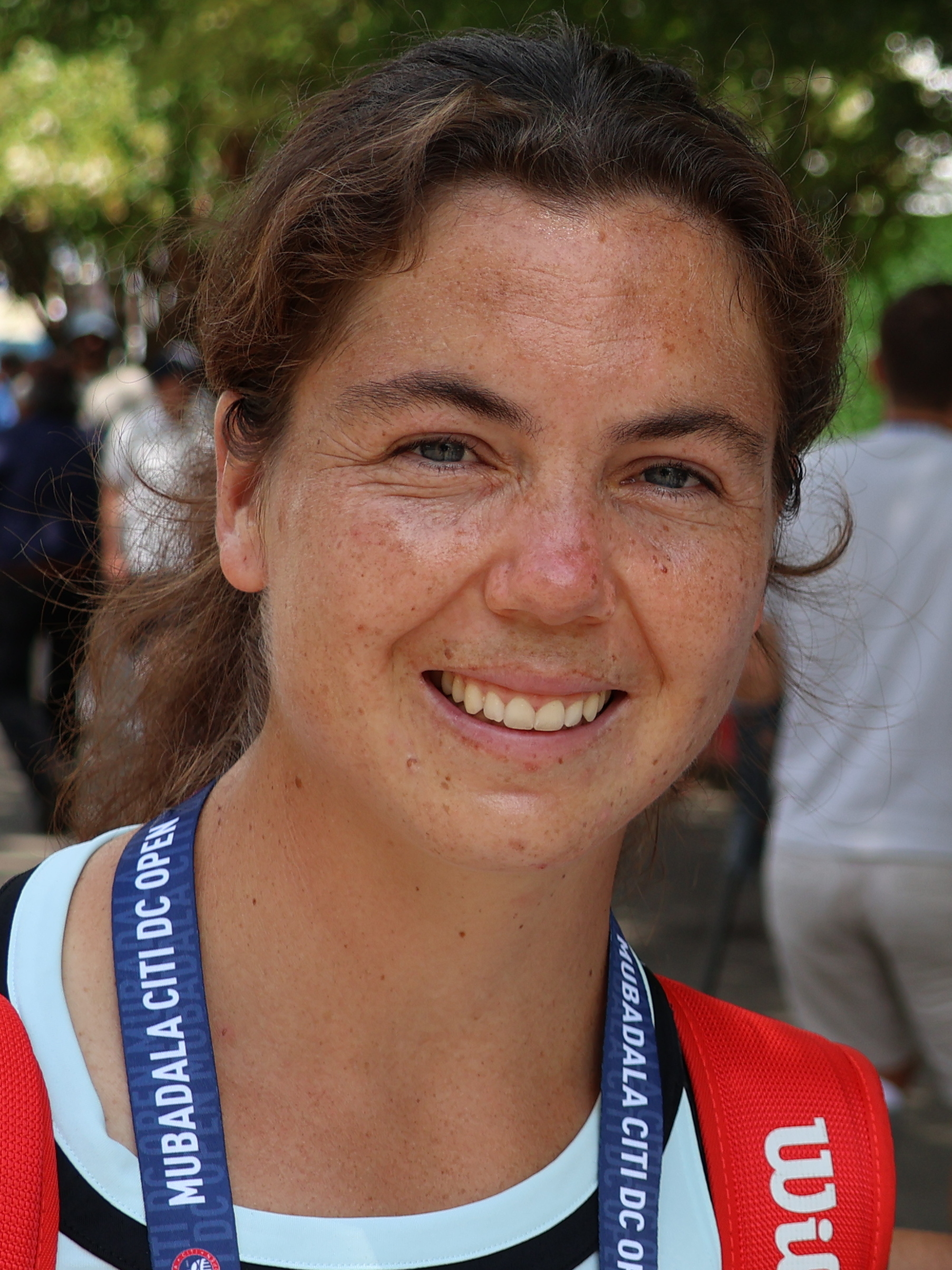
- Eikeri in 2023
- Full name: Ulrikke Pia Eikeri
- Country (sports): Norway
- Born: 16 December 1992 (age 33) Oslo, Norway
- Turned pro: 2007
- Plays: Right (two-handed backhand)
- Prize money: $1,695,847

Singles
- Career record: 400–287
- Career titles: 0 WTA, 11 ITF
- Highest ranking: No. 206 (16 April 2018)

Grand Slam singles results
- Wimbledon: Q1 (2021, 2022)
- US Open: Q1 (2014, 2015, 2019)

Doubles
- Career record: 397–287
- Career titles: 4 WTA, 2 WTA Challengers
- Highest ranking: No. 26 (22 April 2024)
- Current ranking: No. 38 (9 November 2026)

Grand Slam doubles results
- Australian Open: 3R (2022)
- French Open: SF (2025)
- Wimbledon: 2R (2023, 2024, 2026)
- US Open: 2R (2021, 2022, 2025)

Grand Slam mixed doubles results
- Australian Open: 1R (2024)
- French Open: F (2022)
- Wimbledon: SF (2024)
- US Open: 1R (2024)

Team competitions
- Fed Cup: 42–28
- Last updated on: 14 November 2026.

Ulrikke Pia Eikeri (born 16 December 1992) is a Norwegian professional tennis player. On 22 April 2024, she peaked at No. 26 in the WTA doubles rankings. She has a best singles ranking of No. 206, achieved on 16 April 2018.

Eikeri has won four doubles titles on the WTA Tour, and two doubles titles on WTA 125 tournaments, along with eleven singles titles and 32 doubles titles on the ITF Circuit. She reached the mixed-doubles final at the 2022 French Open, alongside Joran Vliegen.

On the ITF Junior Circuit, Eikeri had been ranked as high as No. 16 in the world.

Playing for the Norway Billie Jean King Cup team, she has a win–loss record of 42–28, as of July 2026.

== Career ==
=== 2010: Juniors ===
In 2010, Eikeri reached the semifinals of the Australian Open in girls' doubles alongside Camila Silva.

=== 2021: First doubles title ===
Eikeri won her first WTA Tour title in doubles in October 2021, playing alongside Ellen Perez at the 2021 Tenerife Open.

=== 2022: Historic mixed-doubles final ===
At the 2022 French Open, she reached the final in mixed doubles on her debut partnering Joran Vliegen defeating 2021 Wimbledon champions Desirae Krawczyk and Neal Skupski in the process. They lost in the final to Ena Shibahara and Wesley Koolhof. By making her first major final in her first try at mixed doubles, Ulrikke Eikeri became Norway's first Grand Slam championship finalist in the Open Era.

=== 2023: WTA 500 title, WTA Elite Trophy debut ===
In June, she won her second WTA Tour title in doubles, winning the Nottingham Open alongside Ingrid Neel, defeating Harriet Dart and Heather Watson in the final. She won her biggest title to date at the Pan Pacific Open, also with Neel. She was selected to play in the Elite Trophy with Lyudmyla Kichenok.

=== 2024: Hong Kong Open doubles title ===
Partnering Makoto Ninomiya, she won the doubles title at the Hong Kong Open, defeating Shuko Aoyama and Eri Hozumi in the final which went to a deciding champions tiebreak.

== Performance timelines ==
Key
W	F	SF	QF	#R	RR	Q#	DNQ	A	NH

(W) winner; (F) finalist; (SF) semifinalist; (QF) quarterfinalist; (#R) rounds 4, 3, 2, 1; (RR) round-robin stage; (Q#) qualification round; (DNQ) did not qualify; (A) absent; (NH) not held; (SR) strike rate (events won / competed); (W–L) win–loss record.
To avoid confusion and double counting, these charts are updated at the conclusion of a tournament or when the player's participation has ended.

Only main-draw results in WTA Tour, Grand Slam tournaments, Fed Cup/BJK Cup and Olympic Games are included in win–loss records.

=== Singles ===
Tournament	2014	2015	...	2019	2020	2021	2022	2023	SR	W–L
Grand Slam tournaments
Australian Open	A	A		A	A	A	A	A	0 / 0	0–0
French Open	A	A		A	A	A	A	A	0 / 0	0–0
Wimbledon	A	A		A	NH	Q1	Q1	A	0 / 0	0–0
US Open	Q1	Q1		Q1	A	A	A	A	0 / 0	0–0
Win–Loss	0–0	0–0		0–0	0–0	0–0	0–0	0–0	0 / 0	0–0
WTA 1000
Dubai / Qatar Open (Note: The first Premier 5 event of the year has switched back and forth between the Dubai Tennis Championships and the Qatar Ladies Open since 2009. Dubai was classified as a Premier 5 event from 2009 to 2011 before being succeeded by Doha for the 2012–2014 period. In 2015, Dubai regained its Premier 5 status while Doha was demoted to Premier status. The Premier 5 tournaments were reclassified as WTA 1000 tournaments in 2021.)	A	A		A	A	A	Q1	A	0 / 0	0–0
Italian Open	A	A		A	Q1	A	Q1	A	0 / 0	0–0
Guadalajara Open	NH						Q1	Q1	0 / 0	0–0
Career statistics
Tournaments	0	0		0	1	4	4	0	Career total: 9	
Overall win–loss	0–0	0–0		0–0	0–1	0–4	1–4	0–2	0 / 9	1–11
Year-end ranking	223	425		242	257	301	375	540	$610,683	

=== Doubles ===
Current through the 2026 Wuhan Open.

Tournament	2018	2019	2020	2021	2022	2023	2024	2025	2026	SR	W–L	Win%
Grand Slam tournaments
Australian Open	A	A	A	A	3R	1R	1R	2R	1R	0 / 5	3–5	38%
French Open	A	A	1R	A	2R	2R	3R	SF	3R	0 / 6	10–6	63%
Wimbledon	A	A	NH	A	1R	2R	2R	1R	2R	0 / 5	3–5	38%
US Open	A	A	A	2R	2R	1R	1R	2R	1R	0 / 6	3–6	33%
Win–Loss	0–0	0–0	0–1	1–1	4–4	2–4	3–4	6–4	3–4	0 / 22	19–22	46%
WTA 1000
Dubai / Qatar Open	A	A	A	A	2R	A	QF	2R	2R	0 / 4	5–4	56%
Indian Wells Open	A	A	NH	2R	1R	1R	2R	1R	1R	0 / 6	2–6	25%
Miami Open	A	A	NH	A	1R	A	1R	1R	1R	0 / 4	0–4	0%
Madrid Open	A	A	NH	A	QF	A	A	2R	QF	0 / 3	4–3	57%
Italian Open	A	A	A	A	1R	QF	A	QF	1R	0 / 4	3–4	43%
Canadian Open	A	A	NH	QF	1R	QF	1R	1R	2R	0 / 6	5–6	45%
Cincinnati Open						1R	A	1R	2R	0 / 3	1–3	25%
Guadalajara Open	NH				1R	QF	1R	A	A	0 / 3	2–3	40%
China Open			NH				1R	2R	2R	0 / 3	2–3	40%
Career statistics
Tournaments	1	3	5	12	26	19				Career total: 66		
Titles	0	0	0	1	0	0				Career total: 1		
Finals	0	0	0	2	1	0				Career total: 3		
Overall win–loss	0–1	2–3	2–5	18–11	19–25	26–19				1 / 66	67–64	51%
Year-end ranking	162	138	132	61	43	38	38	38				

== Grand Slam tournament finals ==
=== Mixed doubles: 1 (runner-up) ===
Result	Year	Tournament	Surface	Partner	Opponents	Score
Loss	2022	French Open	Clay	(Belgium) Joran Vliegen	(Japan) Ena Shibahara (Netherlands) Wesley Koolhof	6–7^{(5–7)}, 2–6

== WTA Tour finals ==
=== Doubles: 8 (4 titles, 4 runner-ups) ===
Legend WTA 1000 WTA 500 (1–2) WTA 250 (3–2)	Finals by surface Hard (3–0) Clay (0–4) Grass (1–0)	Finals by setting Outdoor (4–3) Indoor (0–1)

Result	W–L	Date	Tournament	Tier	Surface	Partner	Opponents	Score
Loss	0–1	Jul 2021	Lausanne Open, Switzerland	WTA 250	Clay	(Greece) Valentini Grammatikopoulou	(Switzerland) Susan Bandecchi (Switzerland) Simona Waltert	3–6, 7–6^{(3)}, [5–10]
Win	1–1	Oct 2021	Tenerife Open, Spain	WTA 250	Hard	(Australia) Ellen Perez	(Ukraine) Lyudmyla Kichenok (Ukraine) Marta Kostyuk	6–3, 6–3
Loss	1–2	Jul 2022	Lausanne Open, Switzerland	WTA 250	Clay	(Slovenia) Tamara Zidanšek	(Serbia) Olga Danilović (France) Kristina Mladenovic	walkover
Win	2–2	Jun 2023	Nottingham Open, UK	WTA 250	Grass	(Estonia) Ingrid Neel	(United Kingdom) Harriet Dart (United Kingdom) Heather Watson	7–6^{(6)}, 5–7, [10–8]
Win	3–2	Sep 2023	Pan Pacific Open, Japan	WTA 500	Hard	(Estonia) Ingrid Neel	(Japan) Eri Hozumi (Japan) Makoto Ninomiya	3–6, 7–5, [10–5]
Loss	3–3	Apr 2024	Stuttgart Grand Prix, Germany	WTA 500	Clay (i)	(Estonia) Ingrid Neel	(Chinese Taipei) Chan Hao-ching (Russia) Veronika Kudermetova	6–4, 3–6, [2–10]
Win	4–3	Oct 2024	Hong Kong Open, China SAR	WTA 250	Hard	(Japan) Makoto Ninomiya	(Japan) Eri Hozumi (Japan) Shuko Aoyama	6–4, 4–6, [11–9]
Loss	4–4	May 2026	Strasbourg International, France	WTA 500	Clay	(United States) Quinn Gleason	(Canada) Gabriela Dabrowski (Brazil) Luisa Stefani	5–7, 4–6

== WTA 125 finals ==
=== Doubles: 3 (2 titles, 1 runner-up) ===
Result	W–L	Date	Tournament	Surface	Partner	Opponents	Score
Win	1–0	Jul 2022	Contrexéville Open, France	Clay	(Slovakia) Tereza Mihalíková	(Russia) Alexandra Panova (China) Han Xinyun	7–6^{(8)}, 6–2
Loss	1–1	May 2023	Open de Saint-Malo, France	Clay	(Japan) Eri Hozumi	(Belgium) Greet Minnen (Netherlands) Bibiane Schoofs	6–7^{(7)}, 6–7^{(3)}
Win	2–1	Aug 2023	Chicago Challenger, US	Hard	(Estonia) Ingrid Neel	(Russia) Alexandra Panova (Spain) Cristina Bucșa	w/o

== ITF Circuit finals ==
=== Singles: 19 (11 titles, 8 runner-ups) ===
Legend $100,000 tournaments (0–1) $25,000 tournaments (4–1) $10/15,000 tournaments (7–6)	Finals by surface Hard (3–3) Clay (8–5)

Result	W–L	Date	Tournament	Tier	Surface	Opponent	Score
Loss	0–1	Jun 2008	ITF Gausdal, Norway	10,000	Hard	(Russia) Natalia Ryzhonkova	3–6, 1–6
Win	1–1	Aug 2010	ITF Savitaipale, Finland	10,000	Clay	(Finland) Piia Suomalainen	7–5, 6–4
Win	2–1	Oct 2010	ITF Espinho, Portugal	10,000	Clay	(France) Alice Tisset	6–0, 6–0
Win	3–1	Aug 2011	ITF Iława, Poland	10,000	Clay	(Czech Republic) Tereza Smitková	6–3, 6–2
Loss	3–2	Aug 2011	ITF Locri, Italy	10,000	Clay	(Italy) Agnese Zucchini	6–2, 5–7, 4–6
Win	4–2	Aug 2011	ITF Bagnatica, Italy	10,000	Clay	(Armenia) Ani Amiraghyan	6–4, 6–4
Win	5–2	Jan 2012	ITF Coimbra, Portugal	10,000	Hard	(Poland) Justyna Jegiołka	2–6, 7–5, 6–3
Loss	5–3	Dec 2013	ITF São José dos Campos, Brazil	10,000	Clay	(Argentina) Catalina Pella	3–6, 4–6
Win	6–3	Dec 2013	ITF Bertioga, Brazil	25,000	Hard	(Netherlands) Cindy Burger	6–4, 2–6, 6–4
Win	7–3	Mar 2014	ITF Jackson, United States	25,000	Clay	(Ukraine) Anhelina Kalinina	6–2, 6–4
Loss	7–4	May 2015	ITF Pula, Italy	10,000	Clay	(Italy) Martina Trevisan	3–6, 6–3, 1–6
Win	8–4	Aug 2015	ITF Fort Worth, United States	10,000	Hard	(United States) Frances Altick	6–3, 6–1
Loss	8–5	Oct 2015	ITF Hilton Head, United States	10,000	Hard	(United States) Alexa Graham	4–6, 6–7^{(5)}
Win	9–5	Apr 2017	ITF Pelham, United States	25,000	Clay	(United States) Usue Maitane Arconada	7–5, 6–2
Win	10–5	Jun 2017	ITF Baja, Hungary	25,000	Clay	(Slovakia) Chantal Škamlová	7–6^{(4)}, 6–2
Win	11–5	Oct 2017	ITF Hilton Head, United States	15,000	Clay	(Italy) Bianca Turati	6–4, 6–1
Loss	11–6	Oct 2017	ITF Sumter, United States	25,000	Hard	(United States) Taylor Townsend	2–6, 1–6
Loss	11–7	Sep 2018	ITF Varna, Bulgaria	15,000	Clay	(Romania) Georgia Crăciun	2–6, 5–7
Loss	11–8	Jul 2019	Contrexéville Open, France	100,000	Clay	(Ukraine) Katarina Zavatska	4–6, 4–6

=== Doubles: 46 (32 titles, 14 runner-ups) ===
Legend $100,000 tournaments (2–0) $75,000 tournaments (0–1) $60,000 tournaments (2–1) $25,000 tournaments (18–6) $10,000 tournaments (10–6)	Finals by surface Hard (13–5) Clay (19–9)

Result	W–L	Date	Tournament	Tier	Surface	Partner	Opponents	Score
Win	1–0	Oct 2008	ITF Stockholm, Sweden	10k	Hard (i)	(Norway) Helene Auensen	(Sweden) Anna Brazhnikova (Denmark) Malou Ejdesgaard	6–2, 4–6, [10–8]
Win	2–0	Sep 2010	ITF Lleida, Spain	10k	Clay	(Norway) Caroline Rohde-Moe	(France) Alix Collombon (France) Jessica Ginier	7–5, 5–0 ret.
Win	3–0	Sep 2010	ITF Porto, Portugal	10k	Clay	(Germany) Lena-Marie Hofmann	(United States) Gail Brodsky (United States) Alexandra Riley	7–6^{(4)}, 6–7^{(5)}, [10–5]
Win	4–0	Oct 2010	ITF Espinho, Portugal	10k	Clay	(Germany) Lena-Marie Hofmann	(Portugal) Bárbara Luz (United States) Samantha Powers	6–3, 6–1
Win	5–0	Jan 2011	GB Pro-Series Glasgow, UK	10k	Hard (i)	(Bulgaria) Isabella Shinikova	(Serbia) Teodora Mirčić (Croatia) Jasmina Tinjić	6–4, 6–4
Loss	5–1	Jan 2011	ITF Wrexham, UK	10k	Hard (i)	(United Kingdom) Nicole George	(United Kingdom) Anna Fitzpatrick (United Kingdom) Jade Windley	1–6, 0–6
Loss	5–2	Jan 2011	ITF Coimbra, Portugal	10k	Hard (i)	(Spain) Arabela Ferández Rabener	(Germany) Kim Grajdek (Poland) Barbara Sobaszkiewicz	6–7^{(1)}, 3–6
Loss	5–3	Feb 2011	ITF Vale do Lobo, Portugal	10k	Hard	(United Kingdom) Anna Fitzpatrick	(Spain) Olga Sáez Larra (Spain) Rocío de la Torre Sánchez	w/o
Loss	5–4	Jul 2011	ITF Sarajevo, Bosnia & Herzegovina	10k	Clay	(Hungary) Csilla Argyelán	(Czech Republic) Simona Dobrá (Czech Republic) Martina Kubičíková	2–6, 1–6
Loss	5–5	Aug 2011	ITF Locri, Italy	10k	Clay	(Italy) Alessia Camplone	(Japan) Yuka Higuchi (Japan) Hirono Watanabe	6–3, 3–6, [8–10]
Loss	5–6	Nov 2011	ITF Asunción, Paraguay	10k	Clay	(Venezuela) Andrea Gámiz	(Argentina) Mailen Auroux (Argentina) María Irigoyen	1–6, 6–2, [5–10]
Win	6–6	Jan 2012	ITF Coimbra, Portugal	10k	Hard	(Slovakia) Lucia Butkovská	(Sweden) Beatrice Cedermark (Sweden) Matilda Hamlin	6–3, 6–1
Win	7–6	Jan 2012	ITF Coimbra, Portugal	10k	Hard	(Slovakia) Lucia Butkovská	(Italy) Martina Caciotti (Italy) Nicole Clerico	6–3, 6–0
Win	8–6	Mar 2012	ITF La Marsa, Tunisia	25k	Clay	(Bulgaria) Isabella Shinikova	(Bosnia and Herzegovina) Mervana Jugić-Salkić (Austria) Sandra Klemenschits	6–3, 6–4
Win	9–6	Oct 2012	ITF Florence, United States	25k	Hard	(Japan) Akiko Omae	(United States) Brooke Austin (United States) Hayley Carter	6–1, 6–1
Loss	9–7	Nov 2012	Phoenix Tennis Classic, US	75k	Hard	(Canada) Eugenie Bouchard	(United States) Jacqueline Cako (United States) Natalie Pluskota	3–6, 6–2, [4–10]
Win	10–7	Jan 2013	ITF Innisbrook, US	25k	Clay	(United States) Hsu Chieh-yu	(Argentina) Florencia Molinero (Venezuela) Adriana Pérez	6–3, 6–0
Win	11–7	Mar 2016	ITF Orlando, US	10k	Clay	(Netherlands) Quirine Lemoine	(Bosnia and Herzegovina) Ema Burgić Bucko (Bulgaria) Dia Evtimova	6–1, 6–3
Win	12–7	Jun 2016	ITF Minsk, Belarus	25k	Clay	(Brazil) Laura Pigossi	(Belarus) Ilona Kremen (Belarus) Iryna Shymanovich	6–2, 6–4
Loss	12–8	Jun 2016	ITF Minsk, Belarus	25k	Clay	(Brazil) Laura Pigossi	(Greece) Valentini Grammatikopoulou (Russia) Anna Kalinskaya	6–4, 1–6, [2–10]
Win	13–8	Dec 2016	ITF Antalya, Turkey	10k	Clay	(Bosnia and Herzegovina) Ema Burgić Bucko	(Ukraine) Maryna Chernyshova (Russia) Anna Ukolova	6–4, 6–1
Win	14–8	Dec 2016	ITF Antalya, Turkey	10k	Clay	(Bosnia and Herzegovina) Ema Burgić Bucko	(Poland) Sonia Grzywocz (United States) Caitlyn Williams	6–1, 6–1
Loss	14–9	May 2017	ITF Naples, US	25k	Clay	(United States) Sophie Chang	(United States) Emina Bektas (Chile) Alexa Guarachi	3–6, 1–6
Loss	14–10	Jun 2017	Hódmezővásárhely Ladies Open, Hungary	60k	Clay	(Croatia) Tereza Mrdeža	(Japan) Kotomi Takahata (India) Prarthana Thombare	0–1 ret.
Loss	14–11	Jan 2018	ITF Daytona Beach, US	25k	Clay	(Belarus) Ilona Kremen	(United States) Usue Maitane Arconada (Chile) Alexa Guarachi	3–6, 4–6
Loss	14–12	Jan 2018	ITF Orlando, US	25k	Clay	(Belarus) Ilona Kremen	(China) Guo Hanyu (Chinese Taipei) Hsu Ching-wen	3–6, 6–3, [10–12]
Win	15–12	Jan 2018	ITF Wesley Chapel, US	25k	Clay	(Belarus) Ilona Kremen	(Chinese Taipei) Hsu Ching-wen (China) Zheng Wushuang	6–2, 6–3
Loss	15–13	May 2018	ITF Goyang, South Korea	25k	Hard	(Japan) Akiko Omae	(South Korea) Han Na-lae (South Korea) Lee So-ra	2–6, 7–5, [2–10]
Win	16–13	Aug 2018	ITF Las Palmas, Spain	25k	Clay	(Russia) Yana Sizikova	(Turkey) Başak Eraydın (Turkey) İpek Soylu	6–2, 6–4
Win	17–13	Sep 2018	Budapest Ladies Open, Hungary	60k	Clay	(Bulgaria) Elitsa Kostova	(Hungary) Dalma Gálfi (Hungary) Réka Luca Jani	2–6, 6–4, [10–8]
Win	18–13	Oct 2018	ITF Florence, US	25k	Hard	(Kazakhstan) Anna Danilina	(United Kingdom) Tara Moore (Switzerland) Conny Perrin	6–7^{(9)}, 6–2, [10–8]
Win	19–13	Jan 2019	ITF Daytona Beach, US	W25	Clay	(Hungary) Anna Bondár	(United States) Hailey Baptiste (United States) Emina Bektas	6–3, 5–7, [11–9]
Win	20–13	Apr 2019	ITF Sunderland, UK	W25	Hard (i)	(Poland) Maja Chwalińska	(United States) Emina Bektas (United Kingdom) Tara Moore	6–4, 3–6, [11–9]
Win	21–13	Jun 2019	ITF Minsk, Belarus	W25	Clay	(Italy) Martina Colmegna	(Russia) Amina Anshba (Czech Republic) Anastasia Dețiuc	1–6, 6–4, [10–6]
Loss	21–14	Aug 2019	Kozerki Open, Poland	W25	Clay	(Bulgaria) Isabella Shinikova	(Poland) Anna Hertel (Ukraine) Anastasiya Shoshyna	7–6^{(6)}, 2–6, [4–10]
Win	22–14	Aug 2019	WSG Open Warsaw, Poland	W60	Clay	(Poland) Maja Chwalińska	(Poland) Weronika Falkowska (Poland) Martyna Kubka	6–4, 6–1
Win	23–14	Sep 2019	ITF Clermont-Ferrand, France	W25	Hard (i)	(Belgium) Lara Salden	(France) Lou Brouleau (Romania) Ioana Loredana Roșca	6–1, 6–4
Win	24–14	Dec 2019	ITF Solapur, India	W25	Hard	(India) Ankita Raina	(Turkey) Berfu Cengiz (Greece) Despina Papamichail	5–7, 6–4, [10–3]
Win	25–14	Dec 2019	ITF Pune, India	W25	Hard	(Russia) Ekaterina Yashina	(Russia) Daria Mishina (Russia) Anna Morgina	1–6, 6–3, [10–5]
Win	26–14	Mar 2021	ITF Kazan, Russia	W25	Hard (i)	(Belarus) Shalimar Talbi	(Greece) Valentini Grammatikopoulou (Russia) Anastasia Zakharova	6–4, 6–0
Win	27–14	May 2021	ITF Naples, US	W25	Clay	(United States) Catherine Harrison	(Japan) Erina Hayashi (Japan) Kanako Morisaki	6–2, 3–6, [10–2]
Win	28–14	Jun 2021	ITF Otočec, Slovenia	W25	Clay	(Hungary) Réka Luca Jani	(Slovenia) Pia Lovrič (Burundi) Sada Nahimana	5–7, 6–4, [10–5]
Win	29–14	Jun 2021	ITF Montemor-o-Novo, Portugal	W25	Hard	(Greece) Valentini Grammatikopoulou	(Japan) Eri Hozumi (Japan) Akiko Omae	6–1, 6–0
Win	30–14	Jul 2021	Contrexéville Open, France	W100	Clay	(Kazakhstan) Anna Danilina	(Hungary) Dalma Gálfi (Belgium) Kimberley Zimmermann	6–0, 1–6, [10–4]
Win	31–14	Mar 2023	ITF Toronto, Canada	W25	Hard (i)	(Hungary) Fanny Stollár	(United States) Maya Joint (United States) Mia Yamakita	7–6^{(6)}, 6–0
Win	32–14	Apr 2023	Oeiras Ladies Open, Portugal	W100	Clay	(Japan) Eri Hozumi	(Portugal) Francisca Jorge (Portugal) Matilde Jorge	4–6, 6–4, [10–5]

== Team competition ==
=== Fed Cup/Billie Jean King Cup ===
==== Singles (21–13) ====
Edition	Stage	Date	Location	Against	Surface	Opponent	W/L	Score
2008	Z3 R/R	Apr 2008	Yerevan (ARM)	Mauritius	Clay	Astrid Tixier	W	6–1, 6–2
2008	Z3 R/R	Apr 2008	Yerevan (ARM)	Zimbabwe	Clay	Denise Atzinger	W	6–0, 6–0
2008	Z3 R/R	Apr 2008	Yerevan (ARM)	Latvia	Clay	Trīna Šlapeka	W	6–1, 6–3
2008	Z3 R/R	Apr 2008	Yerevan (ARM)	Iceland	Clay	Rebekka Pétursdóttir	W	6–0, 6–0
2009	Z3 R/R	Apr 2009	Marsa (MLT)	Liechtenstein	Hard	Kathinka von Deichmann	W	6–1, 6–4
2009	Z3 R/R	Apr 2009	Marsa (MLT)	Iceland	Hard	Sandra Kristjánsdóttir	W	6–0, 6–1
2009	Z3 R/R	Apr 2009	Marsa (MLT)	Armenia	Hard	Anna Movsisyan	L	4–6, 1–6
2009	Z3 R/R	Apr 2009	Marsa (MLT)	Moldova	Hard	Olga Terteac	W	6–1, 6–2
2009	Z3 R/R	Apr 2009	Marsa (MLT)	Egypt	Hard	May El Wardany	W	6–0, 6–0
2010	Z2 R/R	Apr 2010	Yerevan (ARM)	Armenia	Clay	Ani Amiraghyan	L	6–4, 2–6, 3–6
2010	Z2 R/R	Apr 2010	Yerevan (ARM)	Finland	Clay	Emma Laine	L	1–6, 2–6
2010	Z2 R/R	Apr 2010	Yerevan (ARM)	(Georgia (country)) Georgia	Clay	Anna Tatishvili	L	2–6, 3–6
2010	Z2 P/O	May 2010	Yerevan (ARM)	Liechtenstein	Clay	Stephanie Vogt	L	4–6, 5–7
2011	Z3 R/R	May 2011	Cairo (EGY)	(Republic of Ireland) Ireland	Clay	Julia Moriarty	W	6–4, 6–1
2011	Z3 R/R	May 2011	Cairo (EGY)	Moldova	Clay	Julia Helbet	W	1–6, 7–5, 6–3
2011	Z3 R/R	May 2011	Cairo (EGY)	Tunisia	Clay	Ons Jabeur	W	7–6^{(7–3)}, 6–4
2011	Z3 R/R	May 2011	Cairo (EGY)	Egypt	Clay	Menna El Nagdy	W	6–0, 6–1
2012	Z2 R/R	Apr 2012	Cairo (EGY)	Latvia	Clay	Diāna Marcinkēviča	L	3–6, 3–6
2012	Z2 P/O	Apr 2012	Cairo (EGY)	Finland	Clay	Piia Suomalainen	L	6–3, 4–6, 3–6
2016	Z3 R/R	Apr 2016	Ulcinj (MNE)	Morocco	Clay	Rita Atik	W	6–0, 6–1
2016	Z3 R/R	Apr 2016	Ulcinj (MNE)	Montenegro	Clay	Danka Kovinić	L	1–6, 0–6
2016	Z3 R/R	Apr 2016	Ulcinj (MNE)	Kosovo	Clay	Edita Raca	W	6–0, 6–0
2016	Z3 R/R	Apr 2016	Ulcinj (MNE)	Mozambique	Clay	Cláudia Sumaia	W	6–0, 6–0
2016	Z3 P/O	Apr 2016	Ulcinj (MNE)	(North Macedonia) Macedonia	Clay	Magdalena Stoilkovska	W	6–3, 6–4
2017	Z2 R/R	Apr 2017	Šiauliai (LIT)	South Africa	Hard (i)	Chanel Simmonds	W	6–3, 6–1
2017	Z2 R/R	Apr 2017	Šiauliai (LIT)	Sweden	Hard (i)	Johanna Larsson	L	0–6, 2–6
2017	Z2 R/R	Apr 2017	Šiauliai (LIT)	Slovenia	Hard (i)	Dalila Jakupović	L	1–6, 2–6
2017	Z2 P/O	Apr 2017	Šiauliai (LIT)	Lithuania	Hard (i)	Joana Eidukonytė	W	6–3, 6–4
2020–21	Z3 R/R	Jun 2021	Vilnius (LIT)	Albania	Hard	Gresi Bajri	W	6–0, 6–0
2020–21	Z3 R/R	Jun 2021	Vilnius (LIT)	North Macedonia	Hard	Aleksandra Simeva	W	6–1, 6–0
2020–21	Z3 P/O	Jun 2021	Vilnius (LIT)	Bosnia and Herzegovina	Hard	Dea Herdželaš	W	7–5, 6–3
2022	Z2 R/R	12 Apr 2022	Vierumäki (FIN)	Egypt	Hard (i)	Mayar Sherif	L	6–3, 6–7^{(7–5)}, 4–6
2022	Z2 R/R	13 Apr 2022	Vierumäki (FIN)	Greece	Hard (i)	Despina Papamichail	L	6–2, 5–7, 4–6
2022	Z2 P/O	15 April 2022	Vierumäki (FIN)	Israel	Hard (i)	Lina Glushko	L	1–6, 4–6

=== Doubles (11–6) ===
Edition	Stage	Date	Location	Against	Surface	Partner	Opponents	W/L	Score
2008	Z3 R/R	23 Apr 2008	Yerevan (ARM)	Zimbabwe	Clay	Helene Auensen	Denise Atzinger; Charlene Tsangamwe	W	6–4, 6–1
2008	Z3 R/R	26 Apr 2008	Yerevan (ARM)	Iceland	Clay	Emma Flood	Sandra Kristjánsdóttir; Rebekka Pétursdóttir	W	6–1, 6–0
2009	Z3 R/R	21 Apr 2009	Marsa (MLT)	Liechtenstein	Hard	Helene Auensen	Kathinka von Deichmann; Marina Novak	L	6–0, 1–6, [8–10]
2009	Z3 R/R	23 Apr 2009	Marsa (MLT)	Armenia	Hard	Helene Auensen	Liudmila Nikoyan; Ofelya Poghosyan	L	1–6, 6–7^{(4–7)}
2010	Z2 R/R	28 Apr 2010	Yerevan (ARM)	Armenia	Clay	Emma Flood	Anna Movsisyan; Liudmila Nikoyan	W	3–6, 6–3, [10–7]
2011	Z3 R/R	3 May 2011	Cairo (EGY)	(Republic of Ireland) Ireland	Clay	Caroline Rohde-Moe	Amy Bowtell; Lynsey McCullough	W	6–1, 6–1
2011	Z3 R/R	4 May 2011	Cairo (EGY)	Moldova	Clay	Emma Flood	Julia Helbet; Alina Soltanici	W	6–1, 6–3
2011	Z3 R/R	5 May 2011	Cairo (EGY)	Tunisia	Clay	Caroline Rohde-Moe	Nour Abbès; Ons Jabeur	L	2–6, 5–7
2011	Z3 R/R	6 May 2011	Cairo (EGY)	Egypt	Clay	Caroline Rohde-Moe	Magy Aziz; Mayar Sherif	L	3–6, 4–6
2012	Z2 R/R	18 Apr 2012	Cairo (EGY)	(Georgia (country)) Georgia	Clay	Emma Flood	Sofia Kvatsabaia; Sofia Shapatava	L	7–6^{(6)}, 4–6, 4–6
2016	Z3 R/R	12 Apr 2016	Ulcinj (MNE)	Montenegro	Clay	Melanie Stokke	Danka Kovinić; Ana Veselinović	W	7–5, 4–6, 7–6^{(6)}
2016	Z3 R/R	14 Apr 2016	Ulcinj (MNE)	Mozambique	Clay	Melanie Stokke	Marieta de Lyubov Nhamitambo; Cláudia Sumaia	W	6–0, 6–1
2020–21	Z3 R/R	15 Jun 2021	Vilnius (LIT)	Albania	Hard	Malene Helgø	Brunilda Mrruku; Rea Qinami	W	6–0, 6–0
2020–21	Z3 R/R	17 Jun 2021	Vilnius (LIT)	North Macedonia	Hard	Malene Helgø	Katarina Marinkovikj; Aleksandra Simeva	W	6–2, 6–0
2022	Z2 R/R	12 Apr 2022	Vierumäki (FIN)	Egypt	Hard (i)	Malene Helgø	Rana Sherif Ahmed; Mayar Sherif	W	6–1, 4–6, 6–2
2022	Z2 R/R	13 Apr 2022	Vierumäki (FIN)	Greece	Hard (i)	Malene Helgø	Eleni Christofi; Despina Papamichail	L	7–5, 4–6, 3–6
2022	Z2 P/O	15 Apr 2022	Vierumäki (FIN)	Israel	Hard (i)	Malene Helgø	Lina Glushko; Shavit Kimchi	W	6–2, 7–5

=== United Cup (1–8) ===
Group membership United Cup (1–8)	Matches by surface Hard (1–8)	Matches by type Singles (0–2) Doubles (1–6)	Matches by setting Outdoors (1–8)

Outcome	No.	Surface	Match type (partner)	Opponent nation	Opponent player(s)	Score
2023
29 December–8 January; Pat Rafter Arena, Brisbane, Australia; Group stage (hardcourt)
Loss	1.	Hard	Singles	Brazil	(Brazil) Laura Pigossi	3–6, 4–6
Loss	2.	Hard	Mixed doubles (with Viktor Durasovic)	Brazil	(Brazil) Luisa Stefani / (Brazil) Rafael Matos	4–6, 5–7
Loss	3.	Hard	Singles	Italy	(Italy) Lucia Bronzetti	2–6, 5–7
Loss	4.	Hard	Mixed doubles (with Viktor Durasovic)	Italy	(Italy) Camilla Rosatello / (Italy) Lorenzo Musetti	6–7^{(6–8)}, 2–6
2024
29 December–7 January; Ken Rosewall Arena, Sydney, Australia; Group stage (hardcourt)
Loss	1.	Hard	Mixed doubles (with Casper Ruud)	Netherlands	(Netherlands) Demi Schuurs / (Netherlands) Wesley Koolhof	6–7^{(5–7)}, 5–7
Win	2.	Hard	Mixed doubles (with Casper Ruud)	Croatia	(Croatia) Donna Vekić / (Croatia) Ivan Dodig	6–2, 3–6, [10–7]
Loss	3.	Hard	Mixed doubles (with Casper Ruud)	France	(France) Caroline Garcia / (France) Édouard Roger-Vasselin	5–7, 4–6
2025
27 December–5 January; Ken Rosewall Arena, Sydney, Australia; Group stage (hardcourt)
Loss	1.	Hard	Mixed doubles (with Viktor Durasovic)	Czech Republic	(Czech Republic) Karolína Muchová / (Czech Republic) Tomáš Macháč	4–6, 4–6
Loss	2.	Hard	Mixed doubles (with Casper Ruud)	Poland	(Poland) Iga Świątek / (Poland) Jan Zieliński	3–6, 6–0, [8–10]
