= 2011 Al Habtoor Tennis Challenge =

- Date: 28 November – 3 December
- Edition: 13th
- Location: (United Arab Emirates) Dubai

Champions

Singles
- (Thailand) Noppawan Lertcheewakarn

Doubles
- (Russia) Nina Bratchikova / (Croatia) Darija Jurak
← 2010 ·	Al Habtoor Tennis Challenge	· 2012 →

The 2011 Al Habtoor Tennis Challenge was a professional tennis tournament played on hard courts. It was the tenth edition of the tournament which was part of the 2011 ITF Women's Circuit. It took place in Dubai, United Arab Emirates between 28 November to 3 December.

== WTA entrants ==
=== Seeds ===
Country	Player	Rank^{1}	Seed
ROU	Simona Halep	53	1
BLR	Anastasiya Yakimova	62	2
SRB	Bojana Jovanovski	65	3
ROU	Alexandra Dulgheru	70	4
FRA	Mathilde Johansson	77	5
NED	Arantxa Rus	84	6
RUS	Evgeniya Rodina	93	7
ROU	Alexandra Cadanțu	96	8

- ^{1} Rankings are as of November 21, 2011.

=== Other entrants ===
The following players received wildcards into the singles main draw:

- (Oman) Fatma Al-Nabhani
- (Croatia) Darija Jurak
- (Switzerland) Conny Perrin
- (United Kingdom) Emily Webley-Smith

The following players received entry from the qualifying draw:

- (Uzbekistan) Nigina Abduraimova
- (Slovenia) Nastja Kolar
- (United Kingdom) Tara Moore
- (Bosnia and Herzegovina) Jasmina Tinjić

== Champions ==
=== Singles ===
(Thailand) Noppawan Lertcheewakarn def. (France) Kristina Mladenovic, 7–5, 6–4

=== Doubles ===
(Russia) Nina Bratchikova / (Croatia) Darija Jurak def. (Uzbekistan) Akgul Amanmuradova / (Romania) Alexandra Dulgheru, 6–4, 3–6, [10–6]
