= Caroline Rohde-Moe =

Norwegian tennis player

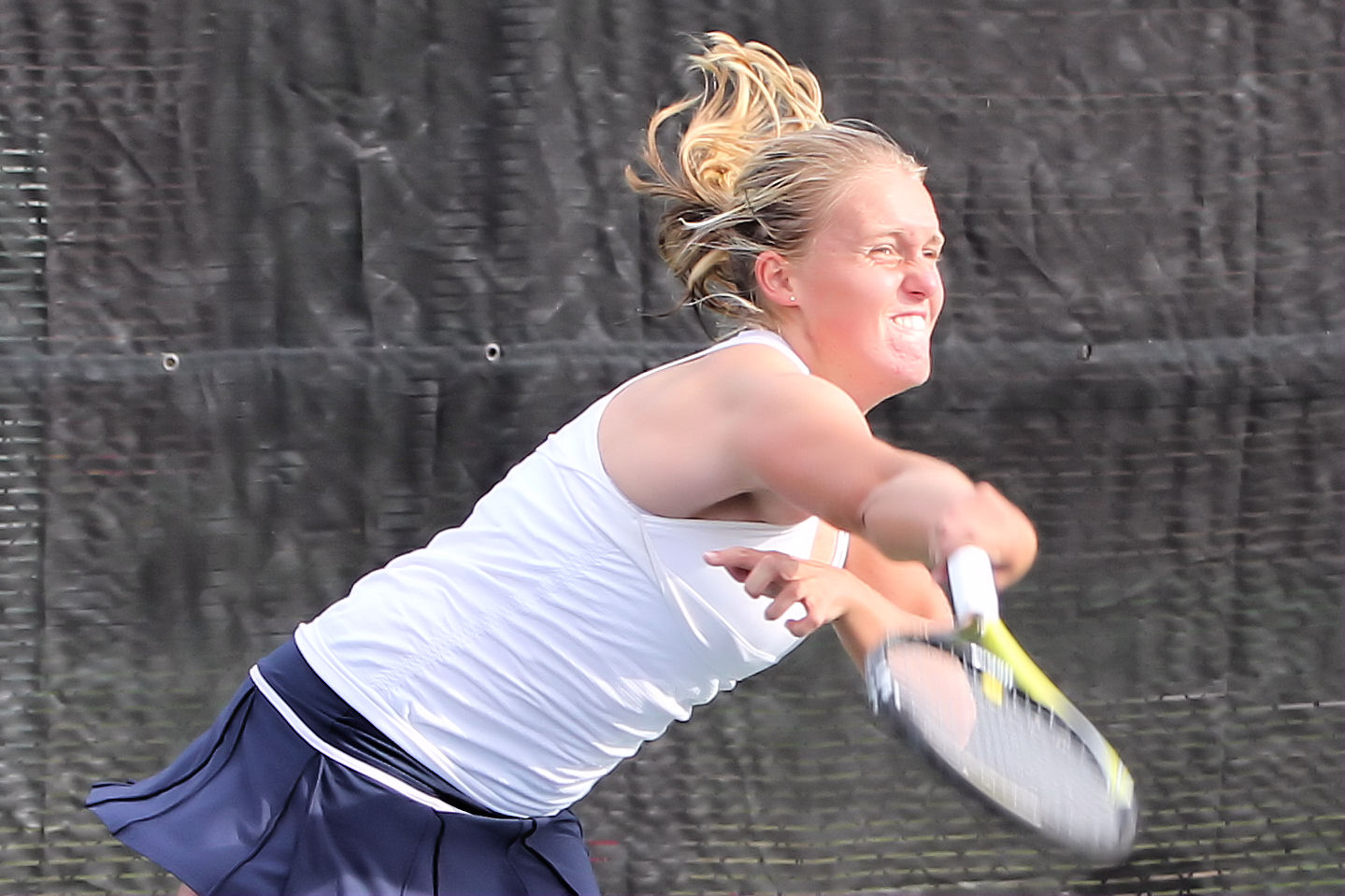
- Country (sports): Norway
- Residence: Blommenholm, Norway
- Born: 10 April 1992 (age 32); Blommenholm
- Height: 1.78 m (5 ft 10 in)
- Plays: Right (two-handed backhand)
- Prize money: $12,234

Singles
- Career record: 40–50
- Highest ranking: No. 719 (3 August 2015)

Doubles
- Career record: 51–42
- Career titles: 2 ITF
- Highest ranking: No. 540 (4 May 2015)

Caroline Rohde-Moe (born 10 April 1992) is a Norwegian former tennis player.

Rohde-Moe has a career-high singles ranking by the WTA of 719, reached on 3 August 2015. She also has a career-high doubles ranking of 540, achieved on 4 May 2015. In her career, Rohde-Moe won two ITF doubles titles.

Playing for Norway in Fed Cup, Rohde-Moe has a win/loss record of 10–5.

== ITF Circuit finals ==
=== Doubles (2–4) ===
Legend $25,000 tournaments $10,000 tournaments	Finals by surface Hard (1–4) Clay (1–0)

Outcome	No.	Date	Tournament	Surface	Partner	Opponents	Score
Winner	1.	13 September 2010	ITF Lleida, Spain	Clay	(Norway) Ulrikke Eikeri	(France) Alix Collombon (France) Jessica Ginier	7–5, 5–0 ret.
Winner	2.	15 June 2014	ITF Sharm El Sheikh, Egypt	Hard	(Russia) Anna Morgina	(Romania) Elena-Teodora Cadar (Spain) Arabela Fernández Rabener	6–3, 7–5
Runner-up	1.	21 January 2015	ITF Sharm El Sheikh, Egypt	Hard	(Sweden) Kajsa Rinaldo Persson	(Japan) Shiho Akita (Japan) Yuuki Tanaka	2–6, 6–7^{(3–7)}
Runner-up	2.	31 January 2015	ITF Sharm El Sheikh, Egypt	Hard	(Japan) Midori Yamamoto	(Latvia) Anastasija Sevastova (Austria) Melanie Klaffner	4–6, 4–6
Runner-up	3.	2 March 2015	ITF Sharm El Sheikh, Egypt	Hard	(Russia) Anna Morgina	(Czech Republic) Markéta Vondroušová (Belarus) Vera Lapko	2–6, 4–6
Runner-up	4.	13 July 2015	ITF Sharm El Sheikh, Egypt	Hard	(United States) Julia Jones	(Russia) Kseniia Bekker (Chinese Taipei) Cho I-hsuan	3–6, 6–3, [4–10]

== Fed Cup participation ==
=== Singles ===
Edition	Round	Date	Location	Against	Surface	Opponent	W/L	Score
2011 Fed Cup; Europe/Africa Zone Group III	R/R	4 May 2011	Cairo, Egypt	Moldova	Clay	Daniela Ciobanu	W	6–2, 6–1
2011 Fed Cup; Europe/Africa Zone Group III	R/R	5 May 2011	Cairo, Egypt	Tunisia	Clay	Nour Abbès	L	3–6, 1–6
2015 Fed Cup; Europe/Africa Zone Group III	P/O	17 April 2015	Ulcinj, Montenegro	Armenia	Clay	Lusine Chobanyan	W	6–0, 6–0

=== Doubles ===
Edition	Round	Date	Location	Against	Surface	Partner	Opponents	W/L	Score
2009 Fed Cup; Europe/Africa Zone Group III	R/R	22 April 2009	Marsa, Malta	Iceland	Hard	(Norway) Emma Flood	Arney Jóhannesdóttir; Eirdís Ragnarsdóttir	W	6–0, 6–1
2009 Fed Cup; Europe/Africa Zone Group III	R/R	24 April 2009	Marsa, Malta	Moldova	Hard	(Norway) Emma Flood	Olga Terteac; Olga Zaicenco	W	6–1, 6–1
2009 Fed Cup; Europe/Africa Zone Group III	R/R	25 April 2009	Marsa, Malta	Egypt	Hard	(Norway) Emma Flood	May El Wardany; Nihal Tarek-Saleh	W	1–0 ret.
2010 Fed Cup; Europe/Africa Zone Group II	R/R	30 April 2010	Yerevan, Armenia	(Georgia (country)) Georgia	Clay	(Norway) Hedda Ødegaard	Oksana Kalashnikova; Sofia Shapatava	L	2–6, 1–6
2011 Fed Cup; Europe/Africa Zone Group III	R/R	3 May 2011	Cairo, Egypt	(Republic of Ireland) Ireland	Clay	(Norway) Ulrikke Eikeri	Amy Bowtell; Lynsey McCullough	W	6–1, 6–1
2011 Fed Cup; Europe/Africa Zone Group III	R/R	5 May 2011	Cairo, Egypt	Tunisia	Clay	(Norway) Ulrikke Eikeri	Nour Abbès; Ons Jabeur	L	2–6, 5–7
2011 Fed Cup; Europe/Africa Zone Group III	R/R	6 May 2011	Cairo, Egypt	Egypt	Clay	(Norway) Ulrikke Eikeri	Magy Aziz; Mayar Sherif	L	3–6, 4–6
2015 Fed Cup; Europe/Africa Zone Group III	R/R	14 April 2015	Ulcinj, Montenegro	Algeria	Clay	(Norway) Melanie Stokke	Amira Benaissa; Inès Ibbou	W	6–1, 6–4
2015 Fed Cup; Europe/Africa Zone Group III	R/R	16 April 2015	Ulcinj, Montenegro	Denmark	Clay	(Norway) Emma Flood	Karen Barbat; Mai Grage	L	4–6, 2–6
2015 Fed Cup; Europe/Africa Zone Group III	P/O	17 April 2015	Ulcinj, Montenegro	Armenia	Clay	(Norway) Melanie Stokke	Ani Amiraghyan; Milena Avetisyan	W	6–2, 6–3
2017 Fed Cup; Europe/Africa Zone Group II	R/R	19 April 2017	Šiauliai, Lithuania	South Africa	Hard (i)	(Norway) Astrid Wanja Brune Olsen	Madrie Le Roux; Chanel Simmonds	W	7–6^{(7–1)}, 6–4
2017 Fed Cup; Europe/Africa Zone Group II	R/R	21 April 2017	Šiauliai, Lithuania	Slovenia	Hard (i)	(Norway) Malene Helgø	Dalila Jakupović; Andreja Klepač	W	1–0 ret.
