= 2011 Fed Cup Europe/Africa Zone Group III – Pool B =

International tennis competition

Group B of the 2011 Fed Cup Europe/Africa Zone Group III was one of four pools in the Europe/Africa zone of the 2011 Fed Cup. Four teams competed in a round robin competition, with the top two teams and the bottom teams proceeding to their respective sections of the play-offs: the top teams played for advancement to the Group II.

		(Norway) NOR	(Egypt) EGY	(Republic of Ireland) IRL	(Moldova) MDA	(Tunisia) TUN	Match; W–L	Set; W–L	Game; W–L	Standings
63	Norway		1–2	2–1	3–0	1–2	2–2	13–11	120–103	3
77	Egypt	2–1		2–1	2–1	1–2	3–1	15–12	120–113	2
80	Ireland	1–2	1–2		3–0	0–3	1–3	11–14	101–119	4
86	Moldova	0–3	1–2	0–3		0–3	0–4	3–19	66–123	5
	Tunisia	2–1	2–1	3–0	3–0		4–0	16–4	116–62	1

== Egypt vs. Tunisia ==
Egypt
1
Smash Tennis Academy, Cairo, Egypt
May 2, 2011
Red clay (outdoors)

Tunisia
2

			1	2	3
1	(Egypt) (Tunisia)	Magy Aziz; Nour Abbès	0; 6	1; 6
2	(Egypt) (Tunisia)	Menna El Nagdy; Ons Jabeur	0; 6	4; 6
3	(Egypt) (Tunisia)	Magy Aziz / Mayar Sherif; Nour Abbès / Sonia Daggou	6; 3	6; 4

== Ireland vs. Moldova ==
Ireland
3
Smash Tennis Academy, Cairo, Egypt
May 2, 2011
Red clay (outdoors)

Moldova
0

			1	2	3
1	(Republic of Ireland) (Moldova)	Amy Bowtell; Daniela Ciobanu	6; 0	6; 2
2	(Republic of Ireland) (Moldova)	Julia Moriarty; Julia Helbert	7^{7} 6^{4}	6; 4
3	(Republic of Ireland) (Moldova)	Lynsey McCullough / Julia Moriarty; Daniela Ciobanu / Alina Soltanici	6; 3	6; 2

== Norway vs. Ireland ==
Norway
2
Smash Tennis Academy, Cairo, Egypt
May 3, 2011
Red clay (outdoors)

Ireland
1

			1	2	3
1	(Norway) (Republic of Ireland)	Emma Flood; Amy Bowtell	2; 6	2; 6
2	(Norway) (Republic of Ireland)	Ulrikke Eikeri; Julia Moriarty	6; 4	6; 1
3	(Norway) (Republic of Ireland)	Ulrikke Eikeri / Caroline Rohde-Moe; Lynsey McCullough / Amy Bowtell	6; 1	6; 1

== Moldova vs. Tunisia ==
Moldova
0
Smash Tennis Academy, Cairo, Egypt
May 3, 2011
Red clay (outdoors)

Tunisia
3

			1	2	3
1	(Moldova) (Tunisia)	Alina Soltanici; Nour Abbès				w/o
2	(Moldova) (Tunisia)	Julia Helbet; Ons Jabeur				w/o
3	(Moldova) (Tunisia)	Daniela Ciobanu / Julia Helbet; Ons Jabeur / Sonia Daggou	2; 6	5; 7

== Norway vs. Moldova ==
Norway
3
Smash Tennis Academy, Cairo, Egypt
May 4, 2011
Red clay (outdoors)

Moldova
0

			1	2	3
1	(Norway) (Moldova)	Caroline Rohde-Moe; Daniela Ciobanu	6; 2	6; 1
2	(Norway) (Moldova)	Ulrikke Eikeri; Julia Helbet	1; 6	7; 5	6; 3
3	(Norway) (Moldova)	Ulrikke Eikeri / Emma Flood; Julia Helbet / Alina Soltanici	6; 1	6; 3

== Egypt vs. Ireland ==
Egypt
2
Smash Tennis Academy, Cairo, Egypt
May 4, 2011
Red clay (outdoors)

Ireland
1

			1	2	3
1	(Egypt) (Republic of Ireland)	Magy Aziz; Amy Bowtell	4; 6	3; 6
2	(Egypt) (Republic of Ireland)	Menna El Nagdy; Julia Moriarty	6; 1	6^{6} 7^{8}	6; 4
3	(Egypt) (Republic of Ireland)	Magy Aziz / Mayar Sherif; Lynsey McCullough / Julia Moriarty	6; 3	6; 4

== Norway vs. Tunisia ==
Norway
1
Smash Tennis Academy, Cairo, Egypt
May 5, 2011
Red clay (outdoors)

Tunisia
2

			1	2	3
1	(Norway) (Tunisia)	Caroline Rohde-Moe; Nour Abbès	3; 6	1; 6
2	(Norway) (Tunisia)	Ulrikke Eikeri; Ons Jabeur	7^{7} 6^{4}	6; 4
3	(Norway) (Tunisia)	Ulrikke Eikeri / Caroline Rohde-Moe; Nour Abbès / Ons Jabeur	2; 6	5; 7

== Egypt vs. Moldova ==
Egypt
2
Smash Tennis Academy, Cairo, Egypt
May 5, 2011
Red clay (outdoors)

Moldova
1

			1	2	3
1	(Egypt) (Moldova)	Mai El Kamash; Alina Soltanici	6; 2	6; 1
2	(Egypt) (Moldova)	Menna El Nagdy; Julia Helbet	6; 4	2; 6	3; 6
3	(Egypt) (Moldova)	Magy Aziz / Mayar Sherif; Daniela Ciobanu / Julia Helbet	6; 2	6; 0

== Norway vs. Egypt ==
Norway
1
Smash Tennis Academy, Cairo, Egypt
May 6, 2011
Red clay (outdoors)

Egypt
2

			1	2	3
1	(Norway) (Egypt)	Emma Flood; Mayar Sherif	6; 3	4; 6	1; 6
2	(Norway) (Egypt)	Ulrikke Eikeri; Menna El Nagdy	6; 0	6; 1
3	(Norway) (Egypt)	Ulrikke Eikeri / Caroline Rohde-Moe; Magy Aziz / Mayar Sherif	3; 6	4; 6

== Ireland vs. Tunisia ==
Ireland
0
Smash Tennis Academy, Cairo, Egypt
May 6, 2011
Red clay (outdoors)

Tunisia
3

			1	2	3
1	(Republic of Ireland) (Tunisia)	Sinéad Lohan; Nour Abbès	5; 7	0; 6
2	(Republic of Ireland) (Tunisia)	Amy Bowtell; Ons Jabeur	2; 6	3; 6
3	(Republic of Ireland) (Tunisia)	Amy Bowtell / Lynsey McCullough; Sonia Daggou / Ons Jabeur	2; 6	2; 6

== See also ==
- Fed Cup structure
