= 2009 Fed Cup Europe/Africa Zone Group III – Pool B =

International tennis competition

Group B of the 2009 Fed Cup Europe/Africa Zone Group III was one of two pools in Group III of the Europe/Africa zone of the 2009 Fed Cup. Five teams competed in a round robin competition, with the top team advanced to Group II for 2010.

		(Norway) NOR	(Egypt) EGY	(Armenia) ARM	(Liechtenstein) LIE	(Iceland) ISL	(Moldova) MDA	Match; W–L	Set; W–L	Game; W–L	Standings
63	Norway		3–0	0–3	2–1	3–0	3–0	4–1	21–8	148–71	2
68	Egypt	0–3		0–3	0–3	3–0	2–1	2–3	10–18	118–135	4
69	Armenia	3–0	3–0		2–1	3–0	3–0	5–0	29–5	191–99	1
72	Liechtenstein	1–2	3–0	1–2		3–0	3–0	3–2	22–11	157–99	3
84	Iceland	0–3	0–3	0–3	0–3		0–3	0–5	0–30	21–182	6
85	Moldova	0–3	1–2	0–3	0–3	3–0		1–4	10–22	98–147	5

== Norway vs. Liechtenstein ==
Norway
2
Marsa Sports Club, Marsa, Malta
21 April 2009
Tarmac (outdoors)

Liechtenstein
1

			1	2	3
1	(Norway) (Liechtenstein)	Ulrikke Eikeri; Kathinka von Deichmann	6; 1	6; 4
2	(Norway) (Liechtenstein)	Helene Auensen; Marina Novak	6; 1	6; 4
3	(Norway) (Liechtenstein)	Helene Auensen / Ulrikke Eikeri; Marina Novak / Kathinka von Deichmann	6; 0	1; 6	[8] [10]

== Egypt vs. Iceland ==
Egypt
3
Marsa Sports Club, Marsa, Malta
21 April 2009
Tarmac (outdoors)

Iceland
0

			1	2	3
1	(Egypt) (Iceland)	May El Wardany; Sandra Kristjánsdóttir	6; 2	7; 5
2	(Egypt) (Iceland)	Magy Aziz; Eirdís Ragnarsdóttir	6; 0	6; 0
3	(Egypt) (Iceland)	Magy Aziz / May El Wardany; Sandra Kristjánsdóttir / Iris Staub	7^{7} 6^{1}	6; 1

== Armenia vs. Moldova ==
Armenia
3
Marsa Sports Club, Marsa, Malta
21 April 2009
Tarmac (outdoors)

Moldova
0

			1	2	3
1	(Armenia) (Moldova)	Anna Movsisyan; Olga Terteac	3; 6	6; 1	6; 4
2	(Armenia) (Moldova)	Liudmila Nikoyan; Ecaterina Vasenina	4; 6	6; 2	7; 5
3	(Armenia) (Moldova)	Anna Movsisyan / Liudmila Nikoyan; Ecaterina Vasenina / Olga Zaicenco	6; 2	6; 0

== Norway vs. Iceland ==
Norway
3
Marsa Sports Club, Marsa, Malta
22 April 2009
Tarmac (outdoors)

Iceland
0

			1	2	3
1	(Norway) (Iceland)	Ulrikke Eikeri; Sandra Kristjánsdóttir	6; 0	6; 1
2	(Norway) (Iceland)	Helene Auensen; Eirdís Ragnarsdóttir	6; 0	6; 0
3	(Norway) (Iceland)	Emma Flood / Caroline Rohde-Moe; Arney Jóhannesdóttir / Eirdís Ragnarsdóttir	6; 0	6; 1

== Egypt vs. Moldova ==
Egypt
2
Marsa Sports Club, Marsa, Malta
22 April 2009
Tarmac (outdoors)

Moldova
1

			1	2	3
1	(Egypt) (Moldova)	Nihal Tarek-Saleh; Olga Terteac	1; 6	4; 6
2	(Egypt) (Moldova)	Magy Aziz; Ecaterina Vasenina	6; 3	6; 1
3	(Egypt) (Moldova)	Magy Aziz / Nihal Tarek-Saleh; Olga Terteac / Ecaterina Vasenina	6; 4	6; 4

== Armenia vs. Liechtenstein ==
Armenia
2
Marsa Sports Club, Marsa, Malta
22 April 2009
Tarmac (outdoors)

Liechtenstein
1

			1	2	3
1	(Armenia) (Liechtenstein)	Anna Movsisyan; Kathinka von Deichmann	7; 5	7^{9} 6^{7}
2	(Armenia) (Liechtenstein)	Liudmila Nikoyan; Marina Novak	6^{6} 7^{8}	6; 2	1; 6
3	(Armenia) (Liechtenstein)	Anna Movsisyan / Liudmila Nikoyan; Marina Novak / Kathinka von Deichmann	6; 3	6; 1

== Norway vs. Armenia ==
Norway
0
Marsa Sports Club, Marsa, Malta
23 April 2009
Tarmac (outdoors)

Armenia
3

			1	2	3
1	(Norway) (Armenia)	Ulrikke Eikeri; Anna Movsisyan	4; 6	1; 6
2	(Norway) (Armenia)	Helene Auensen; Liudmila Nikoyan	5; 7	3; 6
3	(Norway) (Armenia)	Helene Auensen / Ulrikke Eikeri; Liudmila Nikoyan / Ofelya Poghosyan	1; 6	6^{4} 7^{7}

== Egypt vs. Liechtenstein ==
Egypt
0
Marsa Sports Club, Marsa, Malta
23 April 2009
Tarmac (outdoors)

Liechtenstein
3

			1	2	3
1	(Egypt) (Liechtenstein)	Nihal Tarek-Saleh; Kathinka von Deichmann	1; 6	4; 6
2	(Egypt) (Liechtenstein)	Magy Aziz; Marina Novak	5; 7	4; 6
3	(Egypt) (Liechtenstein)	Magy Aziz / Nihal Tarek-Saleh; Marina Novak / Kathinka von Deichmann	6^{7} 7^{9}	7; 5	[9] [11]

== Iceland vs. Moldova ==
Iceland
0
Marsa Sports Club, Marsa, Malta
23 April 2009
Tarmac (outdoors)

Moldova
3

			1	2	3
1	(Iceland) (Moldova)	Sandra Kristjánsdóttir; Olga Terteac	0; 6	0; 6
2	(Iceland) (Moldova)	Eirdís Ragnarsdóttir; Ecaterina Vasenina	0; 6	0; 6
3	(Iceland) (Moldova)	Sandra Kristjánsdóttir / Eirdís Ragnarsdóttir; Ecaterina Vasenina / Olga Zaicenco	0; 6	2; 6

== Norway vs. Moldova ==
Norway
3
Marsa Sports Club, Marsa, Malta
24 April 2009
Tarmac (outdoors)

Moldova
0

			1	2	3
1	(Norway) (Moldova)	Ulrikke Eikeri; Olga Terteac	6; 1	6; 2
2	(Norway) (Moldova)	Helene Auensen; Ecaterina Vasenina	6; 3	6; 4
3	(Norway) (Moldova)	Emma Flood / Caroline Rohde-Moe; Olga Terteac / Olga Zaicenco	6; 1	6; 1

== Egypt vs. Iceland ==
Egypt
0
Marsa Sports Club, Marsa, Malta
24 April 2009
Tarmac (outdoors)

Armenia
3

			1	2	3
1	(Egypt) (Armenia)	May El Wardany; Anna Movsisyan	4; 6	2; 6
2	(Egypt) (Armenia)	Magy Aziz; Liudmila Nikoyan	3; 6	2; 6
3	(Egypt) (Armenia)	May El Wardany / Nihal Tarek-Saleh; Liudmila Nikoyan / Ofelya Poghosyan	3; 6	6; 3	[4] [10]

== Liechtenstein vs. Iceland ==
Liechtenstein
3
Marsa Sports Club, Marsa, Malta
24 April 2009
Tarmac (outdoors)

Iceland
0

			1	2	3
1	(Liechtenstein) (Iceland)	Kathinka von Deichmann; Sandra Kristjánsdóttir	6; 1	6; 0
2	(Liechtenstein) (Iceland)	Marina Novak; Eirdís Ragnarsdóttir	6; 0	6; 0
3	(Liechtenstein) (Iceland)	Marina Novak / Kathinka von Deichmann; Sandra Kristjánsdóttir / Eirdís Ragnarsdóttir	6; 0	6; 1

== Norway vs. Egypt ==
Norway
3
Marsa Sports Club, Marsa, Malta
25 April 2009
Tarmac (outdoors)

Egypt
0

			1	2	3
1	(Norway) (Egypt)	Ulrikke Eikeri; May El Wardany	6; 0	6; 0
2	(Norway) (Egypt)	Helene Auensen; Nihal Tarek-Saleh	6; 1	6; 1
3	(Norway) (Egypt)	Emma Flood / Caroline Rohde-Moe; May El Wardany / Nihal Tarek-Saleh	1; 0			retired

== Armenia vs. Iceland ==
Armenia
3
Marsa Sports Club, Marsa, Malta
25 April 2009
Tarmac (outdoors)

Iceland
0

			1	2	3
1	(Armenia) (Iceland)	Anna Movsisyan; Sandra Kristjánsdóttir	6; 1	6; 0
2	(Armenia) (Iceland)	Ofelya Poghosyan; Eirdís Ragnarsdóttir	6; 0	6; 0
3	(Armenia) (Iceland)	Ofelya Poghosyan / Anna Movsisyan; Sandra Kristjánsdóttir / Eirdís Ragnarsdóttir	6; 0	6; 0

== Liechtenstein vs. Moldova ==
Liechtenstein
3
Marsa Sports Club, Marsa, Malta
25 April 2009
Tarmac (outdoors)

Moldova
0

			1	2	3
1	(Liechtenstein) (Moldova)	Kathinka von Deichmann; Olga Terteac	6; 3	6; 2
2	(Liechtenstein) (Moldova)	Marina Novak; Olga Zaicenco	6; 1	6; 1
3	(Liechtenstein) (Moldova)	Marina Novak / Kathinka von Deichmann; Olga Zaicenco / Olga Zaicenco	6; 2	6; 1

- Armenia placed first in this group and thus advanced to Group II for 2010, where they placed last in their pool of four, but fifth overall due to their victory in the relegation play-off.

== See also ==
- Fed Cup structure
