= 2007 Fed Cup Europe/Africa Zone Group III – Pool A =

Group A of the 2007 Fed Cup Europe/Africa Zone Group III was one of two pools in the Europe/Africa zone of the 2007 Fed Cup. Five teams competed in a round robin competition, with the top team advanced to Group I for 2008.

		(Turkey) TUR	(Egypt) EGY	(Liechtenstein) LIE	(Azerbaijan) AZE	(Mauritius) MRI	Match; W–L	Set; W–L	Game; W–L	Standings
60	Turkey		2–0	3–0	3–0	2–1	4–0	18–3	118–44	1
66	Egypt	0–2		1–2	3–0	1–2	1–3	11–15	109–116	4
75	Liechtenstein	0–3	2–1		3–0	3–0	3–1	16–9	124–109	2
82	Azerbaijan	0–3	0–3	0–3		0–3	0–4	1–16	18–105	5
	Mauritius	1–2	2–1	0–3	3–0		2–2	9–12	97–92	3

== Turkey vs. Liechtenstein ==
Turkey
3
National Tennis Centre, Vacoas-Phoenix, Mauritius
23 April 2007
Hard (outdoors)

Liechtenstein
0

			1	2	3
1	(Turkey) (Liechtenstein)	Çağla Büyükakçay; Marina Novak	6; 4	6; 2
2	(Turkey) (Liechtenstein)	İpek Şenoğlu; Stephanie Vogt	4; 6	6; 2	6; 4
3	(Turkey) (Liechtenstein)	Pemra Özgen / İpek Şenoğlu; Marina Novak / Stephanie Vogt	6; 0	6; 1

== Egypt vs. Mauritius ==
Egypt
1
National Tennis Centre, Vacoas-Phoenix, Mauritius
23 April 2007
Hard (outdoors)

Mauritius
2

			1	2	3
1	(Egypt) (Mauritius)	Nihal Tarek-Saleh; Astrid Tixier	6; 3	6^{2} 7^{7}	6; 2
2	(Egypt) (Mauritius)	Magy Aziz; Marinne Giraud	2; 6	2; 6
3	(Egypt) (Mauritius)	Magy Aziz / Aliaa Fakhry; Marinne Giraud / Astrid Tixier	2; 6	2; 6

== Egypt vs. Azerbaijan ==
Egypt
3
National Tennis Centre, Vacoas-Phoenix, Mauritius
24 April 2007
Hard (outdoors)

Azerbaijan
0

			1	2	3
1	(Egypt) (Azerbaijan)	Nihal Tarek-Saleh; Sayyara Mammadova	6; 1	6; 0
2	(Egypt) (Azerbaijan)	Magy Aziz; Sevil Aliyeva	6; 2	6; 0
3	(Egypt) (Azerbaijan)	Aliaa Fakhry / Nihal Tarek-Saleh; Sevil Aliyeva / Sayyara Mammadova	6^{2} 7^{7}	6; 2	6; 1

== Liechtenstein vs. Mauritius ==
Liechtenstein
3
National Tennis Centre, Vacoas-Phoenix, Mauritius
24 April 2007
Hard (outdoors)

Mauritius
0

			1	2	3
1	(Liechtenstein) (Mauritius)	Marina Novak; Astrid Tixier	6; 4	6; 4
2	(Liechtenstein) (Mauritius)	Stephanie Vogt; Marinne Giraud	6; 4	6; 4
3	(Liechtenstein) (Mauritius)	Marina Novak / Stephanie Vogt; Marinne Giraud / Astrid Tixier	7^{7} 6^{3}	7^{8} 6^{6}

== Turkey vs. Azerbaijan ==
Turkey
3
National Tennis Centre, Vacoas-Phoenix, Mauritius
25 April 2007
Hard (outdoors)

Azerbaijan
0

			1	2	3
1	(Turkey) (Azerbaijan)	Çağla Büyükakçay; Shukufa Abdullayeva	6; 0	6; 0
2	(Turkey) (Azerbaijan)	Pemra Özgen; Sevil Aliyeva	6; 0	6; 2
3	(Turkey) (Azerbaijan)	Çağla Büyükakçay / Pemra Özgen; Shukufa Abdullayeva / Sevil Aliyeva	3; 0			retired

== Egypt vs. Liechtenstein ==
Egypt
1
National Tennis Centre, Vacoas-Phoenix, Mauritius
25 April 2007
Hard (outdoors)

Liechtenstein
2

			1	2	3
1	(Egypt) (Liechtenstein)	Aliaa Fakhry; Marina Novak	3; 6	6; 1	11; 13
2	(Egypt) (Liechtenstein)	Magy Aziz; Stephanie Vogt	2; 6	1; 6
3	(Egypt) (Liechtenstein)	Aliaa Fakhry / Nihal Tarek-Saleh; Stephanie Vogt / Sidonia Wolfinger	6; 3	4; 6	6; 2

== Turkey vs. Mauritius ==
Turkey
2
National Tennis Centre, Vacoas-Phoenix, Mauritius
26 April 2007
Hard (outdoors)

Mauritius
1

			1	2	3
1	(Turkey) (Mauritius)	Çağla Büyükakçay; Astrid Tixier	6; 2	6; 2
2	(Turkey) (Mauritius)	Pemra Özgen; Marinne Giraud	1; 6	2; 6
3	(Turkey) (Mauritius)	Pemra Özgen / İpek Şenoğlu; Marinne Giraud / Astrid Tixier	6; 3	6; 2

== Liechtenstein vs. Azerbaijan ==
Liechtenstein
3
National Tennis Centre, Vacoas-Phoenix, Mauritius
26 April 2007
Hard (outdoors)

Azerbaijan
0

			1	2	3
1	(Liechtenstein) (Azerbaijan)	Marina Novak; Sayyara Mammadova	6; 0	6; 0
2	(Liechtenstein) (Azerbaijan)	Stephanie Vogt; Sevil Aliyeva	6; 1	6; 1
3	(Liechtenstein) (Azerbaijan)	Marina Novak / Stephanie Vogt; Sevil Aliyeva / Sayyara Mammadova				w/o

== Turkey vs. Egypt ==
Turkey
2
National Tennis Centre, Vacoas-Phoenix, Mauritius
27 April 2007
Hard (outdoors)

Egypt
0

			1	2	3
1	(Turkey) (Egypt)	İpek Şenoğlu; Nihal Tarek-Saleh	6; 0	6; 1
2	(Turkey) (Egypt)	Pemra Özgen; Magy Aziz	6; 1	6; 0
3	(Turkey) (Egypt)	Pemra Özgen / İpek Şenoğlu; Magy Aziz / Nihal Tarek-Saleh				not played

== Azerbaijan vs. Mauritius ==
Azerbaijan
0
National Tennis Centre, Vacoas-Phoenix, Mauritius
27 April 2007
Hard (outdoors)

Mauritius
3

			1	2	3
1	(Azerbaijan) (Mauritius)	Shukufa Abdullayeva; Astrid Tixier	0; 6	1; 6
2	(Azerbaijan) (Mauritius)	Sevil Aliyeva; Marinne Giraud				w/o
3	(Azerbaijan) (Mauritius)	Shukufa Abdullayeva / Sevil Aliyeva; Marinne Giraud / Astrid Tixier				w/o

- Turkey placed first in this group and thus advanced to Group II for 2008, where they placed fifth overall.

== See also ==
- Fed Cup structure
