= 2008 Fed Cup Europe/Africa Zone Group III – Pool A =

International tennis competition

Group A of the 2008 Fed Cup Europe/Africa Zone Group III was one of two pools in the Europe/Africa zone of the 2008 Fed Cup. Five teams competed in a round-robin competition, with the top team advancing to Group I for 2009.

		(Latvia) LAT	(Norway) NOR	(Mauritius) MRI	(Iceland) ISL	(Zimbabwe) ZIM	Match; W–L	Set; W–L	Game; W–L	Standings
60	Latvia		2–1	3–0	3–0	3–0	4–0	18–3	125–44	1
65	Norway	1–2		2–1	3–0	3–0	3–1	19–7	135–69	2
76	Mauritius	0–3	1–2		3–0	3–0	2–2	15–7	110–77	3
90	Iceland	0–3	0–3	0–3		3–0	1–3	6–19	60–141	4
	Zimbabwe	0–3	0–3	0–3	0–3		0–4	1–23	48–147	5

== Latvia vs. Zimbabwe ==
Latvia
3
Master Class Tennis and Fitness Club, Yerevan, Armenia
22 April 2008
Red clay (outdoors)

Zimbabwe
0

			1	2	3
1	(Latvia) (Zimbabwe)	Irina Kuzmina; Denise Atzinger	6; 0	6; 2
2	(Latvia) (Zimbabwe)	Anastasija Sevastova; Charlene Tsangamwe	6; 0	6; 0
3	(Latvia) (Zimbabwe)	Diāna Bukājeva / Anastasija Sevastova; Charlene Tsangamwe / Stacey Lock	6; 0	6; 1

== Norway vs. Mauritius ==
Norway
2
Master Class Tennis and Fitness Club, Yerevan, Armenia
22 April 2008
Red clay (outdoors)

Mauritius
1

			1	2	3
1	(Norway) (Mauritius)	Ulrikke Eikeri; Astrid Tixier	6; 1	6; 2
2	(Norway) (Mauritius)	Helene Auensen; Marinne Giraud	2; 6	4; 6
3	(Norway) (Mauritius)	Helene Auensen / Emma Flood; Marinne Giraud / Astrid Tixier	2; 6	6; 1	6; 3

== Norway vs. Zimbabwe ==
Norway
3
Master Class Tennis and Fitness Club, Yerevan, Armenia
23 April 2008
Red clay (outdoors)

Zimbabwe
0

			1	2	3
1	(Norway) (Zimbabwe)	Emma Flood; Stacey Lock	6; 3	6; 0
2	(Norway) (Zimbabwe)	Ulrikke Eikeri; Denise Atzinger	6; 0	6; 0
3	(Norway) (Zimbabwe)	Helene Auensen / Ulrikke Eikeri; Denise Atzinger / Charlene Tsangamwe	6; 4	6; 1

== Mauritius vs. Iceland ==
Mauritius
3
Master Class Tennis and Fitness Club, Yerevan, Armenia
23 April 2008
Red clay (outdoors)

Iceland
0

			1	2	3
1	(Mauritius) (Iceland)	Astrid Tixier; Iris Staub	6; 4	6^{5} 7^{7}	6; 3
2	(Mauritius) (Iceland)	Marinne Giraud; Soumia Islami	6; 1	6; 0
3	(Mauritius) (Iceland)	Emma Taikie / Astrid Tixier; Sandra Kristjánsdóttir / Rebekka Pétursdóttir	6; 2	6; 0

== Latvia vs. Iceland ==
Latvia
3
Master Class Tennis and Fitness Club, Yerevan, Armenia
24 April 2008
Red clay (outdoors)

Iceland
0

			1	2	3
1	(Latvia) (Iceland)	Trīna Šlapeka; Rebekka Pétursdóttir	6; 0	6; 0
2	(Latvia) (Iceland)	Anastasija Sevastova; Sandra Kristjánsdóttir	6; 1	6; 0
3	(Latvia) (Iceland)	Diāna Bukājeva / Trīna Šlapeka; Sandra Kristjánsdóttir / Iris Staub	6; 1	6; 1

== Mauritius vs. Zimbabwe ==
Mauritius
3
Master Class Tennis and Fitness Club, Yerevan, Armenia
24 April 2008
Red clay (outdoors)

Zimbabwe
0

			1	2	3
1	(Mauritius) (Zimbabwe)	Astrid Tixier; Stacey Lock	6; 2	6; 2
2	(Mauritius) (Zimbabwe)	Marinne Giraud; Charlene Tsangamwe	6; 1	6; 0
3	(Mauritius) (Zimbabwe)	Marinne Giraud / Astrid Tixier; Denise Atzinger / Charlene Tsangamwe	6; 3	6; 2

== Latvia vs. Norway ==
Latvia
2
Master Class Tennis and Fitness Club, Yerevan, Armenia
25 April 2008
Red clay (outdoors)

Norway
1

			1	2	3
1	(Latvia) (Norway)	Trīna Šlapeka; Ulrikke Eikeri	1; 6	3; 6
2	(Latvia) (Norway)	Anastasija Sevastova; Helene Auensen	6; 2	6; 1
3	(Latvia) (Norway)	Diāna Bukājeva / Anastasija Sevastova; Helene Auensen / Emma Flood	6^{5} 7^{7}	6; 4	7; 5

== Iceland vs. Zimbabwe ==
Iceland
3
Master Class Tennis and Fitness Club, Yerevan, Armenia
25 April 2008
Red clay (outdoors)

Zimbabwe
0

			1	2	3
1	(Iceland) (Zimbabwe)	Iris Staub; Stacey Lock	6; 2	7; 5
2	(Iceland) (Zimbabwe)	Soumia Islami; Charlene Tsangamwe	7; 5	4; 3		retired
3	(Iceland) (Zimbabwe)	Sandra Kristjánsdóttir / Iris Staub; Denise Atzinger / Stacey Lock	6; 3	3; 6	6; 3

== Latvia vs. Mauritius ==
Latvia
3
Master Class Tennis and Fitness Club, Yerevan, Armenia
26 April 2008
Red clay (outdoors)

Mauritius
0

			1	2	3
1	(Latvia) (Mauritius)	Trīna Šlapeka; Astrid Tixier	6; 1	6; 1
2	(Latvia) (Mauritius)	Anastasija Sevastova; Marinne Giraud	6; 5			retired
3	(Latvia) (Mauritius)	Diāna Bukājeva / Anastasija Sevastova; Marinne Giraud / Astrid Tixier				w/o

== Norway vs. Iceland ==
Norway
3
Master Class Tennis and Fitness Club, Yerevan, Armenia
26 April 2008
Red clay (outdoors)

Iceland
0

			1	2	3
1	(Norway) (Iceland)	Ulrikke Eikeri; Rebekka Pétursdóttir	6; 0	6; 0
2	(Norway) (Iceland)	Helene Auensen; Sandra Kristjánsdóttir	6; 0	6; 0
3	(Norway) (Iceland)	Ulrikke Eikeri / Emma Flood; Sandra Kristjánsdóttir / Rebekka Pétursdóttir	6; 1	6; 0

- Latvia placed first in this group and thus advanced to Group II for 2009. They placed first in their pool of three and also won their promotion play-off match, meaning they achieved promotion to Group I for 2010.
