= 2007 Fed Cup Europe/Africa Zone Group III – Pool B =

International tennis competition

Group B of the 2007 Fed Cup Europe/Africa Zone Group III was one of two pools in the Europe/Africa zone of the 2007 Fed Cup. Five teams competed in a round robin competition, with the top team advanced to Group I for 2008.

| | | (Latvia) LAT | (Republic of Ireland) IRL | (Moldova) MDA | (Malta) MLT | (Montenegro) MNE | Match; W–L | Set; W–L | Game; W–L | Standings |
| 62 | Latvia | | 1–2 | 2–0 | 3–0 | 3–0 | 3–1 | 18–6 | 128–83 | 2 |
| 65 | Ireland | 2–1 | | 3–0 | 3–0 | 2–1 | 4–0 | 22–4 | 140–66 | 1 |
| 77 | Moldova | 0–2 | 0–3 | | 0–3 | 0–3 | 0–4 | 2–22 | 58–141 | 5 |
| 80 | Malta | 0–3 | 0–3 | 3–0 | | 0–2 | 1–3 | 6–18 | 73–124 | 4 |
| 86 | Montenegro | 0–3 | 1–2 | 3–0 | 2–0 | | 2–2 | 13–11 | 110–98 | 3 |

== Latvia vs. Malta ==
Latvia
3
National Tennis Centre, Vacoas-Phoenix, Mauritius
23 April 2007
Hard (outdoors)

Malta
0

| | | | 1 | 2 | 3 |
|---|---|---|---|---|---|
| 1 | (Latvia) (Malta) | Alise Vaidere; Elaine Genovese | 6; 1 | 6; 3 |
| 2 | (Latvia) (Malta) | Irina Kuzmina; Stephanie Sullivan | 6; 4 | 6; 2 |
| 3 | (Latvia) (Malta) | Irina Kuzmina / Alise Vaidere; Kimberley Cassar / Elaine Genovese | 6; 2 | 6; 0 |

== Ireland vs. Montenegro ==
Ireland
2
National Tennis Centre, Vacoas-Phoenix, Mauritius
23 April 2007
Hard (outdoors)

Montenegro
1

| | | | 1 | 2 | 3 |
|---|---|---|---|---|---|
| 1 | (Republic of Ireland) (Montenegro) | Emma Murphy; Andjela Kankaraš | 6; 1 | 6; 1 |
| 2 | (Republic of Ireland) (Montenegro) | Kelly Liggan; Danica Krstajić | 4; 6 | 6; 3 | 2; 6 |
| 3 | (Republic of Ireland) (Montenegro) | Yvonne Doyle / Kelly Liggan; Danica Krstajić / Vanja Radunović | 6; 2 | 6; 3 |

== Ireland vs. Malta ==
Ireland
3
National Tennis Centre, Vacoas-Phoenix, Mauritius
24 April 2007
Hard (outdoors)

Malta
0

| | | | 1 | 2 | 3 |
|---|---|---|---|---|---|
| 1 | (Republic of Ireland) (Malta) | Emma Murphy; Elaine Genovese | 6; 2 | 6; 2 |
| 2 | (Republic of Ireland) (Malta) | Kelly Liggan; Stephanie Sullivan | 6; 2 | 6; 1 |
| 3 | (Republic of Ireland) (Malta) | Rachael Dillon / Yvonne Doyle; Kimberley Cassar / Elaine Genovese | 6; 1 | 6; 0 |

== Moldova vs. Montenegro ==
Moldova
0
National Tennis Centre, Vacoas-Phoenix, Mauritius
24 April 2007
Hard (outdoors)

Montenegro
3

| | | | 1 | 2 | 3 |
|---|---|---|---|---|---|
| 1 | (Moldova) (Montenegro) | Daniela Cociorba; Andjela Kankaraš | 6^{6} 7^{8} | 0; 6 |
| 2 | (Moldova) (Montenegro) | Ecaterina Vasenina; Danica Krstajić | 1; 6 | 0; 6 |
| 3 | (Moldova) (Montenegro) | Daniela Cociorba / Marina Kojanova; Danica Krstajić / Vanja Radunović | 2; 6 | 3; 6 |

== Latvia vs. Montenegro ==
Latvia
3
National Tennis Centre, Vacoas-Phoenix, Mauritius
25 April 2007
Hard (outdoors)

Montenegro
0

| | | | 1 | 2 | 3 |
|---|---|---|---|---|---|
| 1 | (Latvia) (Montenegro) | Alise Vaidere; Andjela Kankaraš | 6; 4 | 7; 5 |
| 2 | (Latvia) (Montenegro) | Irina Kuzmina; Danica Krstajić | 6; 2 | 3; 6 | 6; 4 |
| 3 | (Latvia) (Montenegro) | Diāna Bukājeva / Trīna Šlapeka; Danica Krstajić / Vanja Radunović | 6; 2 | 6; 4 |

== Ireland vs. Moldova ==
Ireland
3
National Tennis Centre, Vacoas-Phoenix, Mauritius
25 April 2007
Hard (outdoors)

Moldova
0

| | | | 1 | 2 | 3 |
|---|---|---|---|---|---|
| 1 | (Republic of Ireland) (Moldova) | Emma Murphy; Marina Kojanova | 6; 0 | 6; 2 |
| 2 | (Republic of Ireland) (Moldova) | Kelly Liggan; Ecaterina Vasenina | 6; 0 | 6; 2 |
| 3 | (Republic of Ireland) (Moldova) | Rachael Dillon / Yvonne Doyle; Daniela Cociorba / Olga Ćosić | 6; 3 | 6; 2 |

== Latvia vs. Ireland ==
Latvia
1
National Tennis Centre, Vacoas-Phoenix, Mauritius
26 April 2007
Hard (outdoors)

Ireland
2

| | | | 1 | 2 | 3 |
|---|---|---|---|---|---|
| 1 | (Latvia) (Republic of Ireland) | Alise Vaidere; Emma Murphy | 2; 6 | 6; 1 | 6; 1 |
| 2 | (Latvia) (Republic of Ireland) | Irina Kuzmina; Kelly Liggan | 4; 6 | 3; 6 |
| 3 | (Latvia) (Republic of Ireland) | Irina Kuzmina / Alise Vaidere; Yvonne Doyle / Kelly Liggan | 2; 6 | 4; 6 |

== Moldova vs. Malta ==
Moldova
0
National Tennis Centre, Vacoas-Phoenix, Mauritius
26 April 2007
Hard (outdoors)

Malta
3

| | | | 1 | 2 | 3 |
|---|---|---|---|---|---|
| 1 | (Moldova) (Malta) | Daniela Cociorba; Elaine Genovese | 1; 6 | 6; 2 | 1; 6 |
| 2 | (Moldova) (Malta) | Marina Kojanova; Kimberley Cassar | 4; 6 | 7; 5 | 1; 6 |
| 3 | (Moldova) (Malta) | Marina Kojanova / Ecaterina Vasenina; Elaine Genovese / Stephanie Sullivan | 4; 6 | 1; 6 |

== Latvia vs. Moldova ==
Latvia
2
National Tennis Centre, Vacoas-Phoenix, Mauritius
27 April 2007
Hard (outdoors)

Moldova
0

| | | | 1 | 2 | 3 |
|---|---|---|---|---|---|---|
| 1 | (Latvia) (Moldova) | Diāna Bukājeva; Daniela Cociorba | 6; 4 | 7; 5 |
| 2 | (Latvia) (Moldova) | Irina Kuzmina; Ecaterina Vasenina | 6; 0 | 6; 3 |
| 3 | (Latvia) (Moldova) | Diāna Bukājeva / Irina Kuzmina; Daniela Cociorba / Ecaterina Vasenina | | | | not played |

== Malta vs. Montenegro ==
Malta
0
National Tennis Centre, Vacoas-Phoenix, Mauritius
27 April 2007
Hard (outdoors)

Montenegro
2

| | | | 1 | 2 | 3 |
|---|---|---|---|---|---|---|
| 1 | (Malta) (Montenegro) | Stephanie Sullivan; Vanja Radunović | 4; 6 | 3; 6 |
| 2 | (Malta) (Montenegro) | Kimberley Cassar; Danica Krstajić | 2; 6 | 1; 6 |
| 3 | (Malta) (Montenegro) | Kimberley Cassar / Stephanie Sullivan; Danica Krstajić / Vanja Radunović | | | | not played |

- Ireland placed first in this group and thus advanced to Group II for 2008, where they placed fourth in their pool of four and were thus relegated back to Group III for 2009.

== See also ==
- Fed Cup structure
