= Trīna Šlapeka =

Latvian tennis player (born 1988)

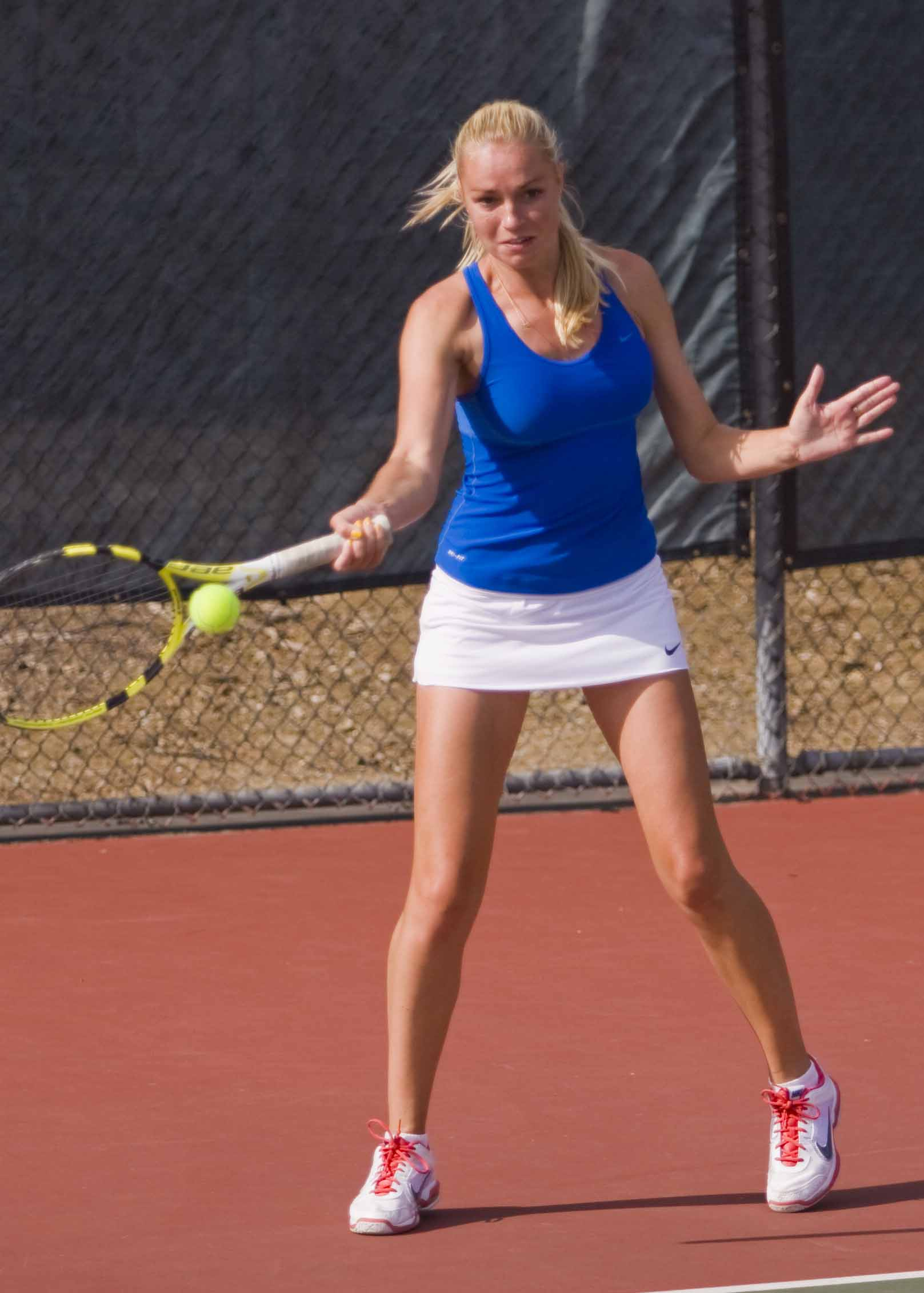
- Šlapeka in 2013
- Full name: Trīna Šlapeka
- Country (sports): Latvia
- Born: 20 May 1988 (age 37) Cēsis, Latvia
- Prize money: $991

Singles
- Career record: 0–9
- Highest ranking: 1400 (28 May 2007)

Grand Slam singles results
- Australian Open Junior: Q2 (2006)
- US Open Junior: Q1 (2005, 2006)

Doubles
- Career record: 3–6
- Highest ranking: 948 (23 April 2007)

Team competitions
- Fed Cup: 4–1

Trīna Šlapeka (born 20 May 1988 in Cēsis) is a retired Latvian tennis player.

Šlapeka never won a professional ITF tournament in her career, but, on 28 May 2007, reached her best singles ranking of world number 1400. On 23 April 2007, she peaked at world number 948 in the doubles rankings. She holds a win–loss record of 4–1 for Latvia in Fed Cup competition, having represented her country in 2007 and 2008 in Mauritius and Armenia respectively. Her latter appearances helped the team get promoted to Group II of the 2009 Fed Cup Europe/Africa Zone.

Šlapeka attended Lindsey Wilson College, in Kentucky, United States, where she gained an undergraduate degree. As of 2013, she was studying for a master's degree in business at the Holy Names University in Oakland, California.

== Fed Cup participation ==
=== Singles ===
Edition	Stage	Date	Location	Against	Surface	Opponent	W/L	Score
2008 Fed Cup; Europe/Africa Zone Group III	R/R	24 April 2008	Yerevan, Armenia	Iceland	Clay	(Iceland) Rebekka Pétursdóttir	W	6–0, 6–0
2008 Fed Cup; Europe/Africa Zone Group III	R/R	25 April 2008	Yerevan, Armenia	Norway	Clay	(Norway) Ulrikke Eikeri	L	1–6, 3–6
2008 Fed Cup; Europe/Africa Zone Group III	R/R	26 April 2008	Yerevan, Armenia	Mauritius	Clay	(Mauritius) Astrid Tixier	W	6–1, 6–1

=== Doubles ===
Edition	Stage	Date	Location	Against	Surface	Partner	Opponents	W/L	Score
2007 Fed Cup; Europe/Africa Zone Group III	R/R	25 April 2007	Vacoas-Phoenix, Mauritius	Montenegro	Hard	(Latvia) Diāna Bukājeva	(Montenegro) Danica Krstajić (Montenegro) Vanja Radunović	W	6–2, 6–4
2008 Fed Cup; Europe/Africa Zone Group III	R/R	24 April 2008	Yerevan, Armenia	Iceland	Clay	(Latvia) Diāna Bukājeva	(Iceland) Sandra Kristjánsdóttir (Iceland) Iris Staub	W	6–1, 6–1
