= 2013 Al Habtoor Tennis Challenge – Singles =

Singles
- 2013 Al Habtoor Tennis Challenge

Final
- Champion: (Slovakia) Jana Čepelová
- Runner-up: (Italy) Maria Elena Camerin
- Score: 6–1, 6–2

Events
Singles	Doubles
- Al Habtoor Tennis Challenge

Kimiko Date-Krumm was the defending champion, having won the event in 2012, but decided not to compete in 2013.

Top seed Jana Čepelová won the tournament, defeating wild card Maria Elena Camerin in the final, 6–1, 6–2.

== Seeds ==
1. (Slovakia) Jana Čepelová (champion)
2. (Austria) Patricia Mayr-Achleitner (semifinals)
3. (Kazakhstan) Yulia Putintseva (quarterfinals; retired)
4. (Ukraine) Nadiya Kichenok (first round)
5. (Slovenia) Tadeja Majerič (quarterfinals)
6. (Croatia) Petra Martić (second round)
7. (Germany) Anna-Lena Friedsam (quarterfinals)
8. (Russia) Nina Bratchikova (first round)

== Main draw ==
Key

- Q = Qualifier
- WC = Wild card
- LL = Lucky loser
- Alt = Alternate
- ITF = ITF entry
- PR = Protected ranking
- SR = Special ranking
- SE = Special exempt
- JE = Junior exempt
- JR = Junior Accelerator Programme entrant
- CO = College Accelerator Programme entrant
- NG = Next Gen Accelerator Program entrant
- w/o = Walkover
- r = Retired
- d = Defaulted

=== Finals ===
Semifinals
1	(Slovakia) Jana Čepelová	7^{7}	4	7^{9}
(Croatia) Ana Konjuh	6^{3}	6	6^{7}
WC	(Italy) Maria Elena Camerin	2	6	7
2	(Austria) Patricia Mayr-Achleitner	6	4	5

Final
1	(Slovakia) Jana Čepelová	6	6
WC	(Italy) Maria Elena Camerin	1	2

=== Top half ===
First round
1	(Slovakia) J Čepelová	6	6
(Uzbekistan) N Abduraimova	3	2
LL	(Philippines) MC Bulilan	1	0
(Croatia) T Mrdeža	6	6
(Russia) V Savinykh	3	3
Q	(Oman) F Al-Nabhani	6	6
(Ukraine) O Savchuk	4	2
7	(Germany) A-L Friedsam	6	6
4	(Ukraine) N Kichenok	7^{7}	5	6^{5}
(Croatia) A Konjuh	6^{6}	7	7^{7}
Q	(Uzbekistan) D Sedova	1	0
(Hungary) R-L Jani	6	6
(Brazil) P Gonçalves	5	7^{7}	3
(Bulgaria) V Tomova	7	6^{3}	6
(Ukraine) L Kichenok	6	6
8	(Russia) N Bratchikova	4	3

Second round
1	(Slovakia) J Čepelová	6	6
(Croatia) T Mrdeža	3	3
Q	(Oman) F Al-Nabhani	6	1	1
7	(Germany) A-L Friedsam	3	6	6
(Croatia) A Konjuh	5	6	6
(Hungary) R-L Jani	7	3	1
(Bulgaria) V Tomova	3	0
(Ukraine) L Kichenok	6	6

Quarterfinals
1	(Slovakia) J Čepelová	7	6
7	(Germany) A-L Friedsam	5	2
(Croatia) A Konjuh	3	7^{7}	6
(Ukraine) L Kichenok	6	6^{3}	4

Semifinals
1	(Slovakia) J Čepelová	7^{7}	4	7^{9}
(Croatia) A Konjuh	6^{3}	6	6^{7}

=== Bottom half ===
First round
6	(Croatia) P Martić	6	6
Q	(Romania) E Bogdan	3	1
(Russia) A Kudryavtseva	3	2
WC	(Italy) ME Camerin	6	6
WC	(Serbia) S Sabljarević	1	0
WC	(Hungary) K Nagy	6	6
(Russia) A Panova	6^{7}	6	3
3	(Kazakhstan) Y Putintseva	7^{9}	4	6
5	(Slovenia) T Majerič	6	1	6
Q	(Russia) E Yashina	4	6	2
(Greece) D Papamichail	6	4	6
(Austria) L-M Moser	4	6	2
(Austria) T Paszek	6	6
(Australia) S Sanders	4	2
WC	(Russia) A Gabueva	0	3
2	(Austria) P Mayr-Achleitner	6	6

Second round
6	(Croatia) P Martić	1	4
WC	(Italy) ME Camerin	6	6
WC	(Hungary) K Nagy	2	4
3	(Kazakhstan) Y Putintseva	6	6
5	(Slovenia) T Majerič	6	6
(Greece) D Papamichail	2	4
(Austria) T Paszek	3	1
2	(Austria) P Mayr-Achleitner	6	6

Quarterfinals
WC	(Italy) ME Camerin	4
3	(Kazakhstan) Y Putintseva	1^{r}
5	(Slovenia) T Majerič	3	2
2	(Austria) P Mayr-Achleitner	6	6

Semifinals
WC	(Italy) ME Camerin	2	6	7
2	(Austria) P Mayr-Achleitner	6	4	5
