= 2013 Al Habtoor Tennis Challenge – Doubles =

Doubles
- 2013 Al Habtoor Tennis Challenge

Final
- Champions: (Russia) Vitalia Diatchenko (Ukraine) Olga Savchuk
- Runners-up: (Ukraine) Lyudmyla Kichenok (Ukraine) Nadiya Kichenok
- Score: 7–5, 6–1

Events
| Singles | Doubles |
- Al Habtoor Tennis Challenge

Maria Elena Camerin and Vera Dushevina were the defending champions, having won the event in 2012, but Dushevina chose not to participate in 2013. Camerin partnered up with Tadeja Majerič, but they lost in the first round to Elena Bogdan and Valeria Savinykh.

Vitalia Diatchenko and Olga Savchuk won the tournament, defeating Lyudmyla and Nadiya Kichenok in the final, 7–5, 6–1.

== Seeds ==
1. (Russia) Nina Bratchikova / (Austria) Sandra Klemenschits (quarterfinals)
2. (Ukraine) Lyudmyla Kichenok / (Ukraine) Nadiya Kichenok (final)
3. (Romania) Elena Bogdan / (Russia) Valeria Savinykh (semifinals)
4. (Slovakia) Jana Čepelová / (Austria) Tamira Paszek (quarterfinals)

== Draw ==
Key

- Q = Qualifier
- WC = Wild card
- LL = Lucky loser
- Alt = Alternate
- ITF = ITF entry
- PR = Protected ranking
- SR = Special ranking
- SE = Special exempt
- JE = Junior exempt
- JR = Junior Accelerator Programme entrant
- CO = College Accelerator Programme entrant
- NG = Next Gen Accelerator Program entrant
- w/o = Walkover
- r = Retired
- d = Defaulted

First round
(Russia) V Diatchenko (Ukraine) O Savchuk | 3 | 6 | [10]
(Croatia) A Konjuh (Bulgaria) V Tomova | 6 | 4 | [6]
4 | (Slovakia) J Čepelová (Austria) T Paszek | 6 | 6
(Austria) L-M Moser (Greece) D Papamichail | 3 | 1
(Uzbekistan) D Sedova (Bulgaria) N Yordanova | 2 | 0
(Austria) P Mayr-Achleitner (Russia) A Panova | 6 | 6
(Hungary) R-L Jani (Russia) E Yashina | 6 | 6
(Nigeria) B Anuna (Philippines) MC Bulilan | 1 | 0
(Italy) ME Camerin (Slovenia) T Majerič | 6 | 4 | [7]
3 | (Romania) E Bogdan (Russia) V Savinykh | 1 | 6 | [10]
(Uzbekistan) N Abduraimova (Oman) F Al-Nabhani | 6 | 6
(Czech Republic) N Platková (Serbia) S Sabljarević | 1 | 2
(Russia) A Gabueva (Hungary) K Nagy | 0 | 3
2 | (Ukraine) L Kichenok (Ukraine) N Kichenok | 6 | 6

Quarterfinals
1 | (Russia) N Bratchikova (Austria) S Klemenschits | 1 | 2
(Russia) V Diatchenko (Ukraine) O Savchuk | 6 | 6
4 | (Slovakia) J Čepelová (Austria) T Paszek | 3 | 6^{2}
(Austria) P Mayr-Achleitner (Russia) A Panova | 6 | 7^{7}
(Hungary) R-L Jani (Russia) E Yashina | 4 | 1
3 | (Romania) E Bogdan (Russia) V Savinykh | 6 | 6
(Uzbekistan) N Abduraimova (Oman) F Al-Nabhani | 2 | 2
2 | (Ukraine) L Kichenok (Ukraine) N Kichenok | 6 | 6

Semifinals
(Russia) V Diatchenko (Ukraine) O Savchuk | 3 | 7^{7} | [10]
(Austria) P Mayr-Achleitner (Russia) A Panova | 6 | 6^{5} | [8]
3 | (Romania) E Bogdan (Russia) V Savinykh | 1 | 4
2 | (Ukraine) L Kichenok (Ukraine) N Kichenok | 6 | 6

Final
(Russia) V Diatchenko (Ukraine) O Savchuk | 7 | 6
2 | (Ukraine) L Kichenok (Ukraine) N Kichenok | 5 | 1
