= Diāna Bukājeva =

Latvian tennis player (born 1991)

- Full name: Diāna Bukājeva
- Country (sports): Latvia
- Born: 16 September 1991 (age 34) Riga, Latvia
- Height: 1.68 m (5 ft 6 in)

Team competitions
- Fed Cup: 5–0

Diāna Bukājeva (born 16 September 1991 in Riga) is a former Latvian tennis player.

Bukājeva holds a win–loss record of 5–0 for Latvia in Fed Cup competition, having represented her country in 2007 and 2008 in Mauritius and Armenia respectively. Her latter appearances helped the team get promoted to Group II of the 2009 Fed Cup Europe/Africa Zone.

== Fed Cup participation ==
=== Singles ===
Edition	Stage	Date	Location	Against	Surface	Opponent	W/L	Score
2007 Fed Cup; Europe/Africa Zone Group III	R/R	27 April 2007	Vacoas-Phoenix, Mauritius	Moldova	Hard	(Moldova) Daniela Cociorba	W	6–4, 7–5

=== Doubles ===
Edition	Stage	Date	Location	Against	Surface	Partner	Opponents	W/L	Score
2007 Fed Cup; Europe/Africa Zone Group III	R/R	25 April 2007	Vacoas-Phoenix, Mauritius	Montenegro	Hard	(Latvia) Trīna Šlapeka	(Montenegro) Danica Krstajić (Montenegro) Vanja Radunović	W	6–2, 6–4
2008 Fed Cup; Europe/Africa Zone Group III	R/R	22 April 2008	Yerevan, Armenia	Zimbabwe	Clay	(Latvia) Anastasija Sevastova	(Zimbabwe) Stacey Lock (Zimbabwe) Charlene Tsangamwe	W	6–0, 6–1
2008 Fed Cup; Europe/Africa Zone Group III	R/R	24 April 2008	Yerevan, Armenia	Iceland	Clay	(Latvia) Trīna Šlapeka	(Iceland) Sandra Kristjánsdóttir (Iceland) Iris Staub	W	6–1, 6–1
2008 Fed Cup; Europe/Africa Zone Group III	R/R	25 April 2008	Yerevan, Armenia	Norway	Clay	(Latvia) Anastasija Sevastova	(Norway) Helene Auensen (Norway) Emma Flood	W	6–7^{(5–7)}, 6–4, 7–5
