= 2013 Al Habtoor Tennis Challenge =

- Date: 11–17 November
- Edition: 15th
- Category: ITF Women's Circuit
- Prize money: $75,000
- Surface: Hard
- Location: Dubai, United Arab Emirates

Champions

Singles
- (Slovakia) Jana Čepelová

Doubles
- (Russia) Vitalia Diatchenko / (Ukraine) Olga Savchuk
- Al Habtoor Tennis Challenge

The 2013 Al Habtoor Tennis Challenge was a professional tennis tournament played on outdoor hard courts. It was the fifteenth edition of the tournament which was part of the 2013 ITF Women's Circuit, offering a total of $75,000 in prize money. It took place in Dubai, United Arab Emirates, on 11–17 November 2013.

== Singles entrants ==
=== Seeds ===
Country	Player	Rank^{1}	Seed
SVK	Jana Čepelová	94	1
AUT	Patricia Mayr-Achleitner	99	2
KAZ	Yulia Putintseva	105	3
UKR	Nadiya Kichenok	107	4
SLO	Tadeja Majerič	113	5
CRO	Petra Martić	116	6
GER	Anna-Lena Friedsam	126	7
RUS	Nina Bratchikova	137	8

- ^{1} Rankings as of 4 November 2013

=== Other entrants ===
The following players received wildcards into the singles main draw:

- (Italy) Maria Elena Camerin
- (Russia) Angelina Gabueva
- (Hungary) Kira Nagy
- (Serbia) Sofia Sabljarević

The following players received entry from the qualifying draw:

- (Oman) Fatma Al-Nabhani
- (Romania) Elena Bogdan
- (Uzbekistan) Dayana Sedova
- (Russia) Ekaterina Yashina

The following player received entry as a lucky loser:

- (Philippines) Maria Concepcion Bulilan

== Champions ==
=== Singles ===
- (Slovakia) Jana Čepelová def. (Italy) Maria Elena Camerin 6–1, 6–2

=== Doubles ===
- (Russia) Vitalia Diatchenko / (Ukraine) Olga Savchuk def. (Ukraine) Lyudmyla Kichenok / (Ukraine) Nadiya Kichenok 7–5, 6–1
