= Jasmina Tinjić =

Bosnian tennis player

- Country (sports): Croatia (2006–2011); Bosnia and Herzegovina (2011 April–present)
- Residence: Tuzla, Bosnia Herzegovina
- Born: 27 February 1991 (age 35) Tuzla
- Turned pro: 2006
- Plays: Right (two-handed backhand)
- Prize money: $95,860

Singles
- Career record: 197–129
- Career titles: 4 ITF
- Highest ranking: No. 236 (23 September 2013)

Doubles
- Career record: 110–71
- Career titles: 12 ITF
- Highest ranking: No. 236 (29 Mai 2017)

Team competitions
- Fed Cup: 14–9

Jasmina Tinjić (born 27 February 1991) is former professional Bosnian tennis player.

In her career, Tinjić won four singles and twelve doubles titles on the ITF Women's Circuit. On 23 September 2013, she reached her best singles ranking of world No. 236. On 29 Mai 2017, she peaked at No. 236 in the doubles rankings.

Playing for the Bosnia and Herzegovina Fed Cup team, Tinjić has a win–loss record of 14–9.

In 2024, Tinjić received a six-year ban from the International Tennis Integrity Agency for match-fixing, to retroactively end May 2028 to align with a previous ban for match-fixing in Sweden.

== ITF finals ==
$50,000 tournaments
$25,000 tournaments
$15,000 tournaments
$10,000 tournaments

=== Singles (4–6) ===
Result	No.	Date	Location	Surface	Opponent	Score
Loss	1.	2 June 2008	Grado Tennis Cup, Italy	Clay	(Austria) Patricia Mayr	4–6, 6–7
Win	2.	10 January 2011	GB Pro-Series Glasgow, UK	Hard	(United Kingdom) Naomi Broady	6–2, 6–2
Win	3.	21 March 2011	ITF Namangan, Uzbekistan	Hard	(Russia) Ekaterina Bychkova	7–6, 2–6, 7–6
Win	4.	13 February 2012	ITF Rabat, Morocco	Clay	(Belgium) Kirsten Flipkens	7–6, 2–6, 7–5
Loss	5.	12 March 2012	ITF Antalya, Turkey	Clay	(Croatia) Ana Savić	0–6, 4–6
Loss	6.	4 June 2012	ITF Zlín, Czech Republic	Clay	(Spain) María Teresa Torró Flor	1–6, 6–1, 1–6
Loss	7.	11 February 2013	Antalya, Turkey	Clay	(Serbia) Jovana Jakšić	2–5 ret.
Loss	8.	24 June 2013	ITF Kristinehamn, Sweden	Clay	(Montenegro) Danka Kovinić	1–6, 5–7
Loss	9.	2 February 2014	ITF Antalya, Turkey	Clay	(Belarus) Sviatlana Pirazhenka	3–6, 1–6
Win	10.	22 February 2014	ITF Helsingborg, Sweden	Hard (i)	(Sweden) Rebecca Peterson	6–1, 6–0

=== Doubles (12–8) ===
Outcome	No.	Date	Location	Surface	Partner	Opponents	Score
Winner	1.	15 March 2010	ITF Amiens, France	Clay	(Israel) Efrat Mishor	(France) Sherazad Reix (France) Alizé Lim	7–6, 5–7, [10–5]
Runner-up	2.	10 January 2011	GB Pro-Series Glasgow, UK	Hard	(Serbia) Teodora Mirčić	(Bulgaria) Isabella Shinikova (Norway) Ulrikke Eikeri	4–6, 4–6
Winner	3.	4 June 2012	ITF Zlín, Czech Republic	Clay	(Bulgaria) Elitsa Kostova	(Brazil) Teliana Pereira (Paraguay) Verónica Cepede Royg	4–6, 6–1, [10–8]
Winner	4.	3 June 2013	ITF Ağrı, Turkey	Carpet	(Turkey) Melis Sezer	(Turkey) Çağla Büyükakçay (Turkey) Pemra Özgen	6–4, 3–6, [10–8]
Runner-up	5.	10 June 2013	ITF Istanbul, Turkey	Hard	(Turkey) Başak Eraydın	(Turkey) İpek Soylu (Turkey) Melis Sezer	4–6, ret.
Runner-up	6.	23 February 2014	ITF Helsingborg, Sweden	Hard (i)	(Ukraine) Olga Ianchuk	(Sweden) Cornelia Lister (Netherlands) Lisanne van Riet	4–6, 3–6
Runner-up	7.	8 June 2015	ITF Banja Luka, Bosnia and Herzegovina	Clay	(Serbia) Nikolina Jović	(Bosnia and Herzegovina) Anita Husarić (France) Laëtitia Sarrazin	2–6, 0–6
Winner	8.	10 January 2016	ITF Antalya, Turkey	Clay	(Slovenia) Nastja Kolar	(Austria) Julia Grabher (Czech Republic) Anna Slováková	7–6^{(5)}, 3–6, [10–6]
Runner-up	9.	30 May 2016	ITF Madrid, Spain	Clay	(Norway) Andrea Raaholt	(Mexico) Marcela Zacarías (Mexico) Renata Zarazúa	4–6, 4–6
Winner	10.	11 July 2016	ITS Cup, Czech Republic	Clay	(Bosnia and Herzegovina) Ema Burgić Bucko	(Philippines) Katharina Lehnert (Ukraine) Anastasiya Shoshyna	7–5, 6–3
Winner	11.	29 January 2017	ITF Antalya, Turkey	Clay	(Bulgaria) Dia Evtimova	(Germany) Tayisiya Morderger (Germany) Yana Morderger	6–4, 6–7^{(4)}, [10–5]
Winner	12.	4 February 2017	ITF Antalya, Turkey	Clay	(Bulgaria) Dia Evtimova	(Germany) Tayisiya Morderger (Germany) Yana Morderger	2–6, 6–3, [10–8]
Runner-up	13.	19 March 2017	ITF Antalya, Turkey	Clay	(Bulgaria) Dia Evtimova	(Russia) Anastasia Frolova (Russia) Alena Tarasova	5–7, 1–6
Winner	14.	9 April 2017	ITF Heraklion, Greece	Clay	(Slovenia) Nastja Kolar	(Serbia) Tamara Čurović (Paraguay) Camila Giangreco Campiz	6–1, 6–1
Winner	15.	6 May 2017	ITF La Marsa, Tunisia	Clay	(Poland) Katarzyna Kawa	(Bosnia and Herzegovina) Dea Herdželaš (Croatia) Tereza Mrdeža	7–5, 6–4
Winner	16.	6 August 2017	ITF Istanbul, Turkey	Clay	(Bulgaria) Dia Evtimova	(Japan) Chihiro Muramatsu (Turkey) Melis Sezer	6–4, 6–2
Winner	17.	10 September 2017	ITF Antalya, Turkey	Clay	(Sweden) Fanny Östlund	(Russia) Anna Iakovleva (Ukraine) Gyulnara Nazarova	6–1, 6–2
Winner	18.	22 October 2017	ITF Pula, Italy	Clay	(Ukraine) Ganna Poznikhirenko	(Germany) Tayisiya Morderger (Germany) Yana Morderger	6–4, 6–3
Runner-up	19.	15 December 2017	ITF Antalya, Turkey	Clay	(Greece) Eleni Kordolaimi	(Ukraine) Maryna Chernyshova (Russia) Alina Silich	3–6, 7–6^{(3)}, [8–10]
Runner-up	20.	27 January 2018	ITF Sharm El Sheikh, Egypt	Hard	(Turkey) Berfu Cengiz	(New Zealand) Jade Lewis (New Zealand) Erin Routliffe	1–6, 7–5, [10–12]
