= Magy Aziz =

Egyptian tennis player (born 1987)

- Full name: Magy Nader Aziz
- Country (sports): Egypt
- Residence: Cairo, Egypt
- Born: 25 December 1987 (age 37)
- Plays: Right-handed (two-handed backhand)
- Prize money: $7,600

Singles
- Career record: 19–44
- Highest ranking: No. 935 (17 June 2013)

Doubles
- Career record: 17–32
- Highest ranking: No. 844 (12 October 2013)

Magy Nader Aziz (Arabic: ماجى نادر عزيز; born 25 December 1987) is an Egyptian former tennis player.

Playing for Egypt in the Fed Cup, she has a win–loss record of 26–21.

== ITF Circuit finals ==
=== Doubles (0–2) ===
Result	Date	Tournament	Surface	Partner	Opponents	Score
Loss	8 July 2012	Sharm El Sheikh, Egypt	Hard	(Egypt) Mora Eshak	(Hong Kong) Venise Chan (Russia) Anna Morgina	1–6, 2–6
Loss	25 August 2013	Sharm El Sheikh, Egypt	Hard	(China) Gai Ao	(Czech Republic) Nikola Horáková (Russia) Julia Valetova	6–3, 6–7^{(2)} [9–11]

== ITF Junior finals ==
Category G1
Category G2
Category G3
Category G4
Category G5

=== Singles (9–1) ===
Outcome	No.	Date	Tournament	Surface	Opponent	Score
Winner	1.	22 September 2002	Cairo, Egypt	Hard	(Egypt) Ola Abou Zekry	6–2, 6–3
Runner-up	2.	29 September 2002	Cairo, Egypt	Hard	(Egypt) Ola Abou Zekry	5–7, 6–0, 4–6
Winner	3.	9 August 2003	Damascus, Syria	Hard	(India) Kartiki-Vijay Bhat	6–0, 6–2
Winner	4.	16 August 2003	Damascus, Syria	Hard	(Egypt) Miray Eshak	6–3, 4–6, 6–1
Winner	5.	21 September 2003	Cairo, Egypt	Clay	(Egypt) Miray Eshak	6–4, 6–3
Winner	6.	10 April 2004	Giza, Egypt	Clay	(Morocco) Fatima El Allami	3–6, 7–5, 6–3
Winner	7.	19 April 2004	Cairo, Egypt	Hard	(Egypt) Ola Abou Zekry	6–2, 6–1
Winner	8.	12 July 2004	Carthage, Tunisia	Clay	(Italy) Stella Menna	6–0, 6–3
Winner	9.	27 July 2004	Giza, Egypt	Clay	(Romania) Bianca Ioana Bonifate	6–2, 7–5
Winner	10.	19 April 2005	Port Louis, Mauritius	Hard	(Egypt) Ola Abou Zekry	7–5, 5–7, 2–6

=== Doubles (6–4) ===
Outcome	No.	Date	Tournament	Surface	Partner	Opponents	Score
Runner-up	1.	28 July 2002	Giza, Egypt	Clay	(Egypt) Amani Khalifa	(Czech Republic) Simona Dobrá (Czech Republic) Klara Jagosova	7–5, 2–6, 5–7
Winner	2.	17 August 2002	Damascus, Syria	Hard	(Egypt) Amina El Sahn	(Algeria) Karima Ait Ali Yahia (Algeria) Houda Yasri	7–5, 6–2
Winner	3.	9 August 2003	Damascus, Syria	Hard	(Egypt) Nihal Tarek-Saleh	(India) Kartiki-Vijay Bhat (India) Pooja Kommireddi	4–6, 6–3, 6–0
Winner	4.	16 August 2003	Damascus, Syria	Hard	(Egypt) Nihal Tarek-Saleh	(India) Ashmitha Easwaramurthi (India) Vandana Murali	6–4, 7–5
Winner	5.	19 April 2004	Cairo, Egypt	Hard	(Botswana) Tapiwa Marobela	(Egypt) Ola Abou Zekry (Egypt) Nihal Tarek-Saleh	6–2, 6–0
Winner	6.	6 July 2004	Tunis, Tunisia	Clay	(Botswana) Tapiwa Marobela	(Canada) Chantal Beetham (Zimbabwe) Fadzai Mawisire	3–6, 6–2, 6–4
Runner-up	7.	12 July 2004	Carthage, Tunisia	Clay	(Botswana) Tapiwa Marobela	(Canada) Chantal Beetham (Zimbabwe) Fadzai Mawisire	4–6, 6–3, 3–6
Winner	8.	1 August 2004	Cairo, Egypt	Clay	(Canada) Chantal Beetham	(Romania) Laura-Ioana Andrei (Romania) Bianca Ioana Bonifate	6–4, 6–4
Runner-up	9.	12 June 2005	Offenbach, Germany	Clay	(Kazakhstan) Amina Rakhim	(Poland) Magdalena Kiszczyńska (Czech Republic) Kateřina Kramperová	3–6, 2–6
Runner-up	10.	24 July 2005	Giza, Egypt	Clay	(Egypt) Ola Abou Zekry	(Czech Republic) Zuzana Linhová (Belarus) Ksenia Milevskaya	2–6, 3–6
