= 2018 Fed Cup Europe/Africa Zone Group III – play-offs =

Subsection of tennis competition

The play-offs of the 2018 Fed Cup Europe/Africa Zone Group III were the final stages of the Group III zonal competition involving teams from Europe and Africa. Using the positions determined in their pools, the seventeen teams faced off to determine their placing in the 2018 Fed Cup Europe/Africa Zone Group III. The top two teams advanced to Fed Cup Europe/Africa Zone Group II.

Placing	Pool A (Tunis)	Pool B (Tunis)	Pool A (Ulcinj)	Pool B (Ulcinj)
1	Lithuania	Tunisia	South Africa	Malta
2	Armenia	Cyprus	Finland	Morocco
3	Macedonia	Algeria	Montenegro	Ireland
4	Iceland	Kosovo	Kenya	Uganda
5	—N/a	Madagascar	—N/a	

== Promotional play-offs ==
The first placed teams of each pool were drawn in head-to-head rounds. The winners advanced to Group II in 2019.

=== Lithuania vs. Tunisia ===
Lithuania
1
Cité Nationale Sportive, Tunis, Tunisia
21 April
Hard

Tunisia
2

			1	2	3
1	(Lithuania) (Tunisia)	Paulina Bakaitė; Chiraz Bechri	5; 7	2; 6
2	(Lithuania) (Tunisia)	Joana Eidukonytė; Ons Jabeur	2; 6	3; 6
3	(Lithuania) (Tunisia)	Iveta Daujotaitė / Gerda Zykutė; Ferdaous Bahri / Mouna Bouzgarrou	7; 5	6; 3

=== South Africa vs. Malta ===
South Africa
2
Ulcinj Bellevue, Ulcinj, Montenegro
19 April
Clay

Malta
1

			1	2	3
1	(South Africa) (Malta)	Katie Poluta; Francesca Curmi	1; 6	0; 6
2	(South Africa) (Malta)	Chanel Simmonds; Elaine Genovese	6; 1	7^{7} 6^{1}
3	(South Africa) (Malta)	Madrie Le Roux / Chanel Simmonds; Francesca Curmi / Elaine Genovese	6; 1	6; 1

== 3rd to 4th play-offs ==
The second placed teams of each pool were drawn in head-to-head rounds to find the equal third and fourth placed teams.

=== Armenia vs. Cyprus ===
Armenia
2
Cité Nationale Sportive, Tunis, Tunisia
21 April
Hard

Cyprus
1

			1	2	3
1	(Armenia) (Cyprus)	Marina Davtyan; Florentia Hadjigeorgiou	7^{7} 6^{3}	5; 7	3; 6
2	(Armenia) (Cyprus)	Ani Amiraghyan; Eleni Louka	6; 3	6; 4
3	(Armenia) (Cyprus)	Ani Amiraghyan / Marina Davtyan; Eleni Louka / Eleni Makride	6; 1	6; 4

=== Finland vs. Morocco ===
Finland
2
Ulcinj Bellevue, Ulcinj, Montenegro
19 April
Clay

Morocco
1

			1	2	3
1	(Finland) (Morocco)	Piia Suomalainen; Rita Atik	2; 6	4; 6
2	(Finland) (Morocco)	Mia Eklund; Diae El Jardi	6; 1	6; 0
3	(Finland) (Morocco)	Mia Eklund / Emma Laine; Rita Atik / Diae El Jardi	6; 4	6; 0

== 5th to 6th play-offs ==
The third placed teams of each pool were drawn in head-to-head rounds to find the equal fifth and sixth placed teams.

=== Macedonia vs. Algeria ===
North Macedonia
2
Cité Nationale Sportive, Tunis, Tunisia
21 April
Hard

Algeria
1

			1	2	3
1	(North Macedonia) (Algeria)	Jana Tanevska; Yassamine Boudjadi	6; 3	1; 6	2; 6
2	(North Macedonia) (Algeria)	Ana Ristevska; Amira Benaissa	6; 3			retired
3	(North Macedonia) (Algeria)	Marija Elenova / Katarina Marinkovikj; Amira Benaissa / Yassamine Boudjadi	6; 2	4; 0		retired

=== Montenegro vs. Ireland ===
Montenegro
0
Ulcinj Bellevue, Ulcinj, Montenegro
19 April
Clay

Ireland
3

			1	2	3
1	(Montenegro) (Republic of Ireland)	Divna Ratković; Jane Fennelly	5; 7	4; 6
2	(Montenegro) (Republic of Ireland)	Anja Drašković; Ruth Copas	0; 1			retired
3	(Montenegro) (Republic of Ireland)	Ana Radović / Divna Ratković; Amy Bowtell / Lauren Deegan	0; 6	0; 6

== 7th to 8th play-offs ==
The fourth placed teams of each pool were drawn in head-to-head rounds to find the seventh and equal eighth placed teams.

=== Iceland vs. Kosovo ===
Iceland
2
Cité Nationale Sportive, Tunis, Tunisia
21 April
Hard

Kosovo
1

			1	2	3
1	(Iceland) (Kosovo)	Sofia Sóley Jónasdóttir; Blearta Ukëhaxhaj	3; 6	6; 4	6; 4
2	(Iceland) (Kosovo)	Anna Soffía Grönholm; Arlinda Rushiti	1; 6	1; 6
3	(Iceland) (Kosovo)	Anna Soffía Grönholm / Sofia Sóley Jónasdóttir; Arlinda Rushiti / Blearta Ukëhaxhaj	4; 6	6; 3	6; 4

=== Kenya vs. Uganda ===
Kenya
3
Ulcinj Bellevue, Ulcinj, Montenegro
19 April
Clay

Uganda
0

			1	2	3
1	(Kenya) (Uganda)	Faith Nyabera Omurunga; Patience Athieno	6; 4	6; 0
2	(Kenya) (Uganda)	Angella Okutoyi; Winnie Birungi	6; 0	6; 0
3	(Kenya) (Uganda)	Judith Muraa / Faith Nyabera Omurunga; Sandra Khissa / Daphine Namulinde Mukasa	6; 0	6; 0

== Final placements ==
Placing	Teams	
Promoted/First	Tunisia	South Africa
Second	Lithuania	Malta
Third	Armenia	Finland
Fourth	Cyprus	Morocco
Fifth	Macedonia	Ireland
Sixth	Algeria	Montenegro
Seventh	Iceland	Kenya
Eighth	Kosovo	Uganda
Ninth	Madagascar	

- Tunisia and South Africa were promoted to Europe/Africa Zone Group II in 2019.
