= Eleni Louka =

Cypriot tennis player (born 2001)

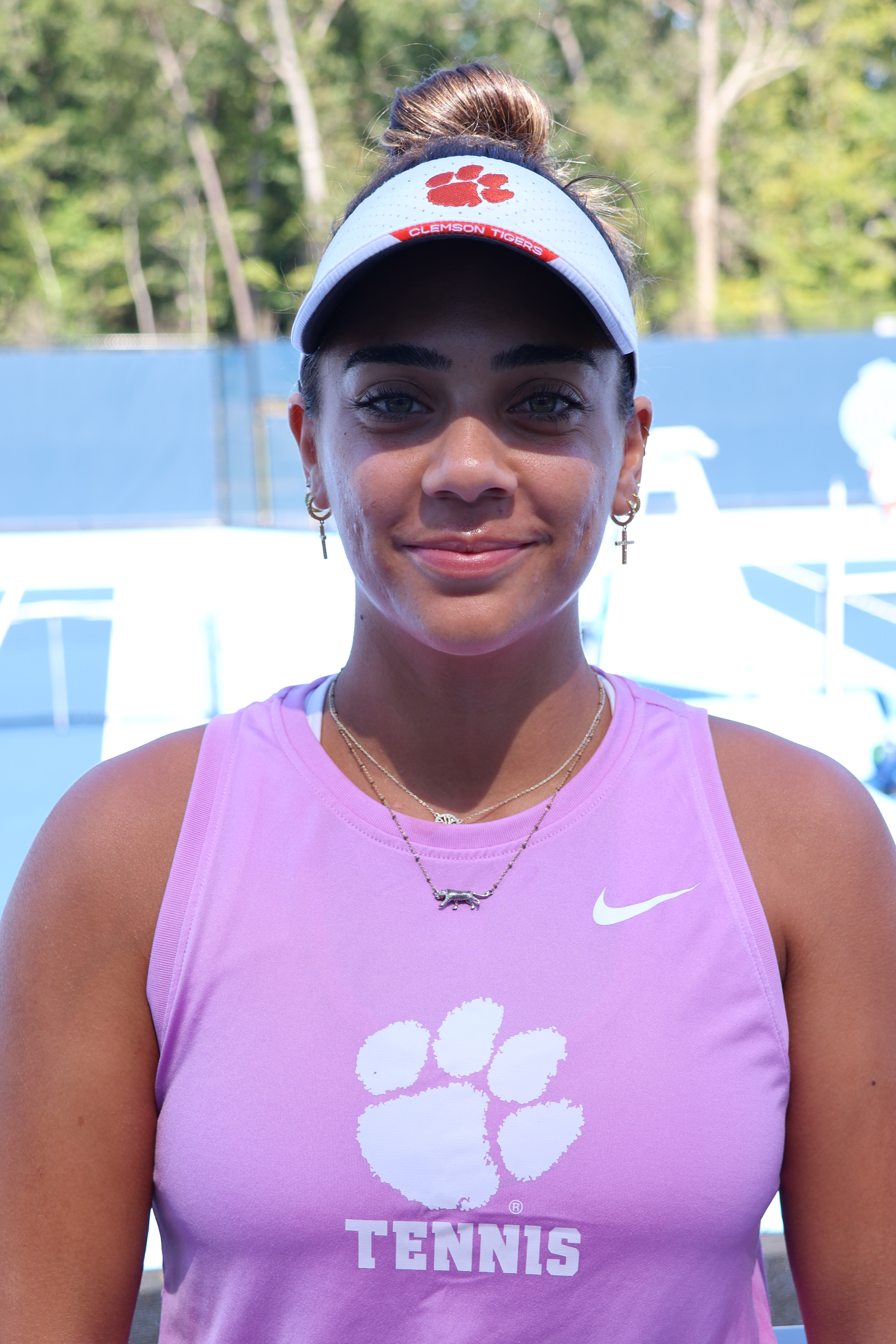
- Louka at the 2023 Kitty Harrison Invitational
- Country (sports): Cyprus
- Born: 25 October 2001 (age 24) Deryneia, Cyprus
- Plays: Right-handed (two-handed backhand)
- College: Clemson

Team competitions
- Fed Cup: 11–8
- Last updated on: 31 August 2020.

Eleni Louka (born 25 October 2001) is a Cypriot tennis player. She has played for Cyprus at the Billie Jean King Cup since 2017.

Louka has a career-high ITF juniors ranking of No. 128, achieved on 31 December 2018.

She started studying at Clemson University in 2019.

== ITF junior finals ==
Grand Slam
Category GA
Category G1
Category G2
Category G3
Category G4
Category G5

=== Singles (4–3) ===
Outcome	No.	Date	Tournament	Grade	Surface	Opponent	Score
Runner-up	1.	26 August 2017	Limassol, Cyprus	G5	Clay	(Germany) Luisa Meyer auf der Heide	3–6, 1–6
Winner	1.	2 September 2017	Larnaca, Cyprus	G4	Hard	(Sweden) Alexandra Viktorovitch	6–7^{(4–7)}, 6–1, 6–2
Runner-up	2.	3 February 2018	Cairo, Egypt	G5	Clay	(Egypt) Amira Badawi	6–3, 6–7^{(4–7)}, 2–6
Winner	2.	9 June 2018	Larnaca, Cyprus	G4	Clay	(Austria) Mavie Österreicher	6–4, 7–6^{(7–2)}
Winner	3.	1 July 2018	Preveza, Greece	G4	Hard	(Italy) Chiara Girelli	6–3, 6–2
Winner	4.	8 July 2018	Corfu, Greece	G4	Carpet	(Serbia) Doroteja Joksović	6–2, 7–6^{(8–6)}
Runner-up	2.	8 September 2018	Limassol, Cyprus	G4	Hard	(Russia) Ekaterina Nikiforova	3–6, 4–6

=== Doubles (7–5) ===
Outcome	No.	Date	Tournament	Grade	Surface	Partner	Opponents	Score
Runner-up	1.	15 April 2017	Bat Yam, Israel	G4	Hard	(Cyprus) Themis Haliou	(Israel) Darya Schwartzman (Israel) Kristin Younes	3–6, 6–4, [3–10]
Runner-up	2.	9 July 2017	Corfu, Greece	G4	Carpet	(Greece) Gabriella Charalampidi	(Slovenia) Pia Lovrič (Turkey) Betina Tokaç	2–6, 5–7
Winner	1.	15 July 2017	Ioannina, Greece	G5	Clay	(Algeria) Lynda Benkaddour	(Bulgaria) Elena Trencheva (Turkey) Doğan Türkmen	6–3, 6–2
Runner-up	3.	26 August 2017	Limassol, Cypus	G5	Clay	(Greece) Gabriella Charalampidi	(Cyprus) Themis Haliou (Germany) Luisa Meyer auf der Heide	3–6, 4–6
Runner-up	4.	11 November 2017	Paralimni, Cypus	G5	Carpet	(Cyprus) Themis Haliou	(Italy) Matilde Mariani (Italy) Matilde Paoletti	1–6, 3–6
Winner	2.	3 February 2018	Cairo, Egypt	G5	Clay	(Cyprus) Eleni Makride	(Egypt) Dalia Ahmed (Egypt) Amira Badawi	3–6, 6–1, [10–7]
Winner	3.	2 June 2018	Limassol, Cyprus	G5	Clay	(Czech Republic) Zdena Šafářová	(Hungary) Luca Jánosi (Austria) Elena Karner	6–4, 1–6, [10–7]
Winner	4.	9 June 2018	Larnaca, Cyprus	G4	Clay	(Russia) Maria Bondarenko	(Czech Republic) Zdena Šafářová (Hungary) Natália Szabanin	6–1, 6–1
Winner	5.	1 July 2018	Preveza, Greece	G4	Hard	(Greece) Gabriella Charalampidi	(Greece) Eleni Fasoula (Greece) Christina Ntanou	6–0, 6–2
Winner	6.	8 July 2018	Corfu, Greece	G4	Carpet	(Greece) Maria Kallistrou	(Serbia) Doroteja Joksović (Russia) Polina Shitikova	4–6, 6–3, [10–3]
Winner	7.	8 September 2018	Limassol, Cyprus	G4	Hard	(Greece) Gabriella Charalampidi	(Russia) Ekaterina Nikiforova (Russia) Evgeniya Safronova	6–2, 6–4
Runner-up	5.	8 June 2019	Larnaca, Cyprus	G4	Clay	(Austria) Mavie Österreicher	(United Kingdom) Esther Adeshina (United Kingdom) Charlotte Russell	7–5, 5–7, [9–11]

== National representation ==
=== Fed Cup ===
Louka made her Fed Cup debut for Cyprus in 2017, while the team was competing in the Europe/Africa Zone Group III, when she was 15 years and 234 days old.

==== Fed Cup (12–10) ====
Group membership World Group (0–0) World Group Play-off (0–0) World Group II (0–0) World Group II Play-off (0–0) Europe/Africa Group (12–10)	Matches by surface Hard (11–9) Clay (1–1) Grass (0–0) Carpet (0–0)	Matches by type Singles (6–7) Doubles (6–3)	Matches by setting Indoors (7–4) Outdoors (5–6)

===== Singles (6–7) =====
Edition	Stage	Date	Location	Against	Surface	Opponent	W/L	Score
2017 Fed Cup; Europe/Africa Zone Group III	Promotional Play-off	17 June 2017	Chișinău, Moldova	Moldova	Clay	Alexandra Perper	L	0–6, 2–6
2018 Fed Cup; Europe/Africa Zone Group III	Pool B	16 April 2018	Tunis, Tunisia	Algeria	Hard	Amira Benaïssa	W	7–6^{(7–5)}, 6–2
2018 Fed Cup; Europe/Africa Zone Group III	Pool B	17 April 2018	Tunis, Tunisia	Madagascar	Hard	Iariniaina Tsantaniony	W	6–3, 6–3
2018 Fed Cup; Europe/Africa Zone Group III	Pool B	18 April 2018	Tunis, Tunisia	Kosovo	Hard	Arlinda Rushiti	L	6–4, 2–6, 2–6
2018 Fed Cup; Europe/Africa Zone Group III	Pool B	20 April 2018	Tunis, Tunisia	Tunisia	Hard	Ons Jabeur	L	2–6, 0–6
2018 Fed Cup; Europe/Africa Zone Group III	3rd-4th place Play-off	21 April 2018	Tunis, Tunisia	Armenia	Hard	Ani Amiraghyan	L	3–6, 4–6
2019 Fed Cup; Europe/Africa Zone Group III	Pool B	15 April 2019	Helsinki, Finland	Kosovo	Hard (i)	Donika Bashota	L	0–6, 3–6
2019 Fed Cup; Europe/Africa Zone Group III	Pool B	16 April 2019	Helsinki, Finland	Algeria	Hard (i)	Inès Bekrar	W	6–3, 6–3
2019 Fed Cup; Europe/Africa Zone Group III	Pool B	17 April 2019	Helsinki, Finland	(Republic of the Congo) Congo	Hard (i)	Anabel Ossombi	W	6–0, 6–0
2019 Fed Cup; Europe/Africa Zone Group III	Pool B	19 April 2019	Helsinki, Finland	North Macedonia	Hard (i)	Magdalena Stoilkovska	W	6–2, 6–0
2019 Fed Cup; Europe/Africa Zone Group III	Promotional Play-off	20 April 2019	Helsinki, Finland	Finland	Hard (i)	Mia Eklund	L	1–6, 6–4, 3–6
2020–21 Billie Jean King Cup; Europe/Africa Zone Group III	Pool B	15 June 2021	Vilnius, Lithuania	Rwanda	Hard (i)	Megane Ingabire	W	6–0, 6–0
2020–21 Billie Jean King Cup; Europe/Africa Zone Group III	Pool B	17 June 2021	Vilnius, Lithuania	Bosnia and Herzegovina	Hard (i)	Nefisa Berberović	L	6–7^{(1–7)}, 0–6

===== Doubles (6–3) =====
Edition	Stage	Date	Location	Against	Surface	Partner	Opponents	W/L	Score
2017 Fed Cup; Europe/Africa Zone Group III	Pool B	16 June 2017	Chișinău, Moldova	(Republic of Ireland) Ireland	Clay	Anna Savchenko	Ruth Copas; Sophia Derivan	W	6–0, 7–6^{(7–4)}
2018 Fed Cup; Europe/Africa Zone Group III	Pool B	16 April 2018	Tunis, Tunisia	Algeria	Hard	Eleni Makride	Amira Benaïssa; Yassamine Boudjadi	W	6–4, 7–6^{(7–3)}
2018 Fed Cup; Europe/Africa Zone Group III	Pool B	18 April 2018	Tunis, Tunisia	Kosovo	Hard	Eleni Makride	Liridona Murati; Arlinda Rushiti	W	6–2, 3–6, 6–1
2018 Fed Cup; Europe/Africa Zone Group III	Pool B	20 April 2018	Tunis, Tunisia	Tunisia	Hard	Eleni Makride	Ferdaous Bahri; Mouna Bouzgarrou	L	6–4, 2–6, 3–6
2018 Fed Cup; Europe/Africa Zone Group III	3rd-4th place Play-off	21 April 2018	Tunis, Tunisia	Armenia	Hard	Eleni Makride	Ani Amiraghyan; Marina Davtyan	L	1–6, 4–6
2019 Fed Cup; Europe/Africa Zone Group III	Pool B	15 April 2019	Helsinki, Finland	Kosovo	Hard (i)	Raluca Șerban	Donika Bashota; Arlinda Rushiti	W	6–2, 6–2
2019 Fed Cup; Europe/Africa Zone Group III	Pool B	16 April 2019	Helsinki, Finland	Algeria	Hard (i)	Raluca Șerban	Inès Bekrar; Yassamine Boudjadi	W	6–0, 6–2
2019 Fed Cup; Europe/Africa Zone Group III	Pool B	17 April 2019	Helsinki, Finland	(Republic of the Congo) Congo	Hard (i)	Raluca Șerban	Gloire Mfoumouangana; Victoire Mfoumouangana	W	6–1, 6–3
2020–21 Billie Jean King Cup; Europe/Africa Zone Group III	Pool B	17 June 2021	Vilnius, Lithuania	Bosnia and Herzegovina	Hard (i)	Raluca Șerban	Nefisa Berberović; Dea Herdželaš	L	3–6, 2–6
