= 2018 Fed Cup Europe/Africa Zone =

Subsection of tennis competition

The Europe/Africa Zone was one of three zones of regional competition in the 2018 Fed Cup.

== Group I ==
- Venue: Tallink Tennis Centre, Tallinn, Estonia (indoor hard)
- Date: 7–10 February

The fourteen teams were divided into two pools of three teams and two pools of four teams. The four pool winners took part in promotion play-offs to determine the two nations advancing to the World Group II play-offs. The nations finishing last in their pools took part in relegation play-offs, with the two losing nations being relegated to Group II for 2019.

=== Seeding ===
Pot	Nation	Rank^{1}	Seed
1	Serbia	17	1
1	Great Britain	18	2
1	Croatia	24	3
1	Poland	26	4
2	Hungary	28	5
2	Turkey	31	6
2	Georgia	36	7
2	Estonia	37	8
3	Austria	39	9
3	Latvia	42	10
3	Bulgaria	44	11
3	Portugal	50	12
3	Sweden	52	13
3	Slovenia	54	14

- ^{1}Fed Cup Rankings as of 13 November 2017

=== Pools ===
	Pool A	SRB	BUL	GEO
1	Serbia (2–0)		2–1	2–1
2	Bulgaria (1–1)	1–2		2–1
3	Georgia (0–2)	1–2	1–2	

	Pool B	GBR	EST	POR
1	Great Britain (2–0)		3–0	3–0
2	Estonia (1–1)	0–3		2–1
3	Portugal (0–2)	0–3	1–2	

	Pool C	HUN	CRO	SLO	SWE
1	Hungary (2–1)		3–0	2–1	1–2
2	Croatia (2–1)	0–3		2–1	2–1
3	Slovenia (1–2)	1–2	1–2		3–0
4	Sweden (1–2)	2–1	1–2	0–3	

	Pool D	LAT	POL	TUR	AUT
1	Latvia (3–0)		2–1	2–1	3–0
2	Poland (2–1)	1–2		2–1	2–1
3	Turkey (1–2)	1–2	1–2		2–1
4	Austria (0–3)	0–3	1–2	1–2	

=== Play-offs ===
Placing	A Team	Score	D Team
Promotional	Serbia	1–2	Latvia
5th–8th	Bulgaria	0–2	Poland
9th	—		Turkey
Relegation	Georgia	2–1	Austria

Placing	B Team	Score	C Team
Promotional	Great Britain	2–0	Hungary
5th–8th	Estonia	2–1	Croatia
9th	—		Slovenia
Relegation	Portugal	0–2	Sweden

=== Final placements ===
Placing	Teams	
Promoted/First	Latvia	Great Britain
Third	Serbia	Hungary
Fifth	Poland	Estonia
Seventh	Bulgaria	Croatia
Ninth	Turkey	Slovenia
Eleventh	Georgia	Sweden
Relegated/Thirteenth	Austria	Portugal

- Great Britain and Latvia were promoted to 2018 Fed Cup World Group II Play-offs
- Austria and Portugal were relegated to Europe/Africa Zone Group II in 2019

== Group II ==
- Venue: Tatoi Club, Athens, Greece (clay)
- Date: 18–21 April

The seven teams were divided into two pools of three and four teams. The four nations finishing first and second took part in a play-off to determine the nations advancing to Group I in 2019. The two nations finishing last (Pool A) and second last (Pool B) in their pools took part in a relegation play-off. The nation finishing last in Pool B was automatically relegated alongside the losing nation of the play-off to Group II for 2019. Moldova withdrew before the event.

=== Seeding ===
Pot	Nation	Rank^{1}	Seed
1	Denmark	51	1
1	Norway	58	2
2	Egypt	61	3
2	Bosnia and Herzegovina	62	4
3	Greece	63	5
3	Israel	67	6
3	Luxembourg	71	7

- ^{1}Fed Cup Rankings as of 12 February 2018

=== Pools ===
	Pool A	GRE	DEN	EGY
1	Greece (2–0)		2–1	2–1
2	Denmark (1–1)	1–2		3–0
3	Egypt (0–2)	1–2	0–3	

	Pool B	ISR	LUX	BIH	NOR
1	Israel (2–1)		2–1	2–1	1–2
2	Luxembourg (2–1)	1–2		2–1	3–0
3	Bosnia and Herzegovina (1–2)	1–2	1–2		3–0
4	Norway (1–2)	2–1	0–3	0–3	

=== Play-offs ===
Placing	A Team	Score	B Team
Promotional	Greece	2–1	Luxembourg
Promotional	Denmark	2–1	Israel
Relegation	Egypt	1–2	Bosnia and Herzegovina
Relegation	—		Norway

- Greece and Denmark were promoted to Europe/Africa Zone Group I in 2019.
- Egypt and Norway were relegated to Europe/Africa Zone Group III in 2019.

== Group III ==
- Venue 1: Cité Nationale Sportive, Tunis, Tunisia (hard)
- Venue 2: Ulcinj Bellevue, Ulcinj, Montenegro (clay)
- Date: 16–21 April

The seventeen teams were divided into three pools of four teams and one pool of five teams. The four nations finishing first and second took part in a play-off to determine the nations advancing to Group I in 2019. One nation will be promoted from each venue.

=== Seeding ===
Pot	Nation	Rank^{1}	Seed
1	Lithuania	65	1
1	Cyprus	73	2
1	Finland	74	3
1	Macedonia	75	4
2	Morocco	80	5
2	South Africa	82	6
2	Ireland	83	7
2	Tunisia	86	8
3	Montenegro	88	9
3	Algeria	89	10
3	Armenia	90	11
3	Madagascar	91	12
4	Malta	92	13
4	Kenya	95	14
4	Kosovo	96	15
4	Iceland	103	16
4	Uganda	NR	17

- ^{1}Fed Cup Rankings as of 12 February 2018

=== Pools ===
	Pool A (Tunis)	LTU	ARM	MKD	ISL
1	Lithuania (3–0)		3–0	3–0	3–0
2	Armenia (2–1)	0–3		3–0	3–0
3	Macedonia (1–2)	0–3	0–3		2–1
4	Iceland (0–3)	0–3	0–3	1–2	

	Pool B (Tunis)	TUN	CYP	ALG	KOS	MAD
1	Tunisia (4–0)		3–0	3–0	3–0	3–0
2	Cyprus (3–1)	0–3		2–1	2–1	2–1
3	Algeria (2–2)	0–3	1–2		2–1	2–1
4	Kosovo (1–3)	0–3	1–2	1–2		2–1
5	Madagascar (0–4)	0–3	1–2	1–2	1–2	

	Pool A (Ulcinj)	RSA	FIN	MNE	KEN
1	South Africa (3–0)		2–1	2–1	3–0
2	Finland (2–1)	1–2		2–1	3–0
3	Montenegro (1–2)	1–2	1–2		2–1
4	Kenya (0–3)	0–3	0–3	1–2	

	Pool B (Ulcinj)	MLT	MAR	IRL	UGA
1	Malta (3–0)		3–0	3–0	3–0
2	Morocco (2–1)	0–3		2–1	3–0
3	Ireland (1–2)	0–3	1–2		3–0
4	Uganda (0–3)	0–3	0–3	0–3	

=== Play-offs ===
Placing (Tunis)	A Team	Score	B Team
Promotional	Lithuania	1–2	Tunisia
3rd–4th	Armenia	2–1	Cyprus
5th–6th	Macedonia	2–1	Algeria
7th–8th	Iceland	2–1	Kosovo
9th	—		Madagascar

Placing (Ulcinj)	A Team	Score	B Team
Promotional	South Africa	2–1	Malta
3rd–4th	Finland	2–1	Morocco
5th–6th	Montenegro	0–3	Ireland
7th–8th	Kenya	3–0	Uganda

- Tunisia and South Africa were promoted to Europe/Africa Zone Group II in 2019.
