= 2019 Fed Cup Europe/Africa Zone Group III – Pool B (Helsinki) =

Subsection of tennis competition

Pool B (Helsinki) of the 2019 Fed Cup Europe/Africa Group III was one of four pools in the Europe/Africa Group III of the 2019 Fed Cup. Five teams competed in a round robin competition, with the top team and bottom teams proceeding to their respective section of the play-offs: the top team played for advancement to Group II.

== Standings ==
| | | CYP | KOS | MKD | ALG | CGO | RR; W–L | Set; W–L | Game; W–L | Standings |
| 3 | Cyprus | | 2–1 | 2–1 | 3–0 | 3–0 | 4–0 | 20–4 (83%) | 127–57 (69%) | 1 |
| 13 | Kosovo | 1–2 | | 2–1 | 2–1 | 2–1 | 3–1 | 15–12 (56%) | 126–104 (55%) | 2 |
| 7 | North Macedonia | 1–2 | 1–2 | | 3–0 | 3–0 | 2–2 | 18–9 (67%) | 128–87 (60%) | 3 |
| 11 | Algeria | 0–3 | 1–2 | 0–3 | | 3–0 | 1–3 | 9–17 (35%) | 73–132 (23%) | 4 |
| 18 | Congo | 0–3 | 1–2 | 0–3 | 0–3 | | 0–4 | 2–22 (8%) | 55–140 (28%) | 5 |

Standings are determined by: 1. number of wins; 2. if two teams have the same number of wins, head-to-head record; 3. if three teams have the same number of wins, (a) number of matches won in the group, then (b) percentage of sets won in the group, then (c) percentage of games won in the group, then (d) Fed Cup rankings.

== Round robin ==
=== Cyprus vs. Kosovo ===
Cyprus
2
Tali Tennis Center, Helsinki, Finland
15 April 2019
Hard (indoor)

Kosovo
1

| | | | 1 | 2 | 3 |
|---|---|---|---|---|---|
| 1 | (Cyprus) (Kosovo) | Eleni Louka; Donika Bashota | 0; 6 | 3; 6 |
| 2 | (Cyprus) (Kosovo) | Raluca Șerban; Arlinda Rushiti | 6; 3 | 6; 1 |
| 3 | (Cyprus) (Kosovo) | Eleni Louka / Raluca Șerban; Donika Bashota / Arlinda Rushiti | 6; 2 | 6; 2 |

=== North Macedonia vs. Congo ===
North Macedonia
3
Tali Tennis Center, Helsinki, Finland
15 April 2019
Hard (indoor)

Congo
0

| | | | 1 | 2 | 3 |
|---|---|---|---|---|---|
| 1 | (North Macedonia) (Republic of the Congo) | Magdalena Stoilkovska; Gloire Mfoumouangana | 6; 2 | 6; 3 |
| 2 | (North Macedonia) (Republic of the Congo) | Lina Gjorcheska; Victoire Mfoumouangana | 6; 0 | 6; 1 |
| 3 | (North Macedonia) (Republic of the Congo) | Lina Gjorcheska / Magdalena Stoilkovska; Gloire Mfoumouangana / Victoire Mfoumouangana | 6; 4 | 6; 0 |

=== Cyprus vs. Algeria ===
Cyprus
3
Tali Tennis Center, Helsinki, Finland
16 April 2019
Hard (indoor)

Algeria
0

| | | | 1 | 2 | 3 |
|---|---|---|---|---|---|
| 1 | (Cyprus) (Algeria) | Eleni Louka; Inès Bekrar | 6; 3 | 6; 3 |
| 2 | (Cyprus) (Algeria) | Raluca Șerban; Amira Benaïssa | 6; 2 | 6; 1 |
| 3 | (Cyprus) (Algeria) | Eleni Louka / Raluca Șerban; Inès Bekrar / Yassamine Boudjadi | 6; 0 | 6; 2 |

=== North Macedonia vs. Kosovo ===
North Macedonia
1
Tali Tennis Center, Helsinki, Finland
16 April 2019
Hard (indoor)

Kosovo
2

| | | | 1 | 2 | 3 |
|---|---|---|---|---|---|
| 1 | (North Macedonia) (Kosovo) | Magdalena Stoilkovska; Donika Bashota | 2; 6 | 6; 3 | 5; 7 |
| 2 | (North Macedonia) (Kosovo) | Lina Gjorcheska; Arlinda Rushiti | 1; 6 | 6; 3 | 2; 6 |
| 3 | (North Macedonia) (Kosovo) | Ana Ristevska / Aleksandra Simeva; Vesa Gjinaj / Blearta Ukëhaxhaj | 6; 4 | 6; 1 |

=== Cyprus vs. Congo ===
Cyprus
3
Tali Tennis Center, Helsinki, Finland
17 April 2019
Hard (indoor)

Congo
0

| | | | 1 | 2 | 3 |
|---|---|---|---|---|---|
| 1 | (Cyprus) (Republic of the Congo) | Eleni Louka; Anabel Ossombi | 6; 0 | 6; 0 |
| 2 | (Cyprus) (Republic of the Congo) | Raluca Șerban; Gloire Mfoumouangana | 6; 1 | 6; 2 |
| 3 | (Cyprus) (Republic of the Congo) | Eleni Louka / Raluca Șerban; Gloire Mfoumouangana / Victoire Mfoumouangana | 6; 1 | 6; 3 |

=== Algeria vs. Kosovo ===
Algeria
1
Tali Tennis Center, Helsinki, Finland
17 April 2019
Hard (indoor)

Kosovo
2

| | | | 1 | 2 | 3 |
|---|---|---|---|---|---|
| 1 | (Algeria) (Kosovo) | Inès Bekrar; Donika Bashota | 2; 6 | 3; 6 |
| 2 | (Algeria) (Kosovo) | Yassamine Boudjadi; Arlinda Rushiti | 0; 6 | 3; 6 |
| 3 | (Algeria) (Kosovo) | Inès Bekrar / Yassamine Boudjadi; Vesa Gjinaj / Arlinda Rushiti | 1; 6 | 6; 4 | 7^{7} 6^{5} |

=== North Macedonia vs. Algeria ===
North Macedonia
3
Tali Tennis Center, Helsinki, Finland
18 April 2019
Hard (indoor)

Algeria
0

| | | | 1 | 2 | 3 |
|---|---|---|---|---|---|
| 1 | (North Macedonia) (Algeria) | Magdalena Stoilkovska; Inès Bekrar | 3; 6 | 6; 3 | 6; 0 |
| 2 | (North Macedonia) (Algeria) | Lina Gjorcheska; Yassamine Boudjadi | 6; 1 | 6; 0 |
| 3 | (North Macedonia) (Algeria) | Lina Gjorcheska / Magdalena Stoilkovska; Inès Bekrar / Yassamine Boudjadi | 6; 1 | 6; 2 |

=== Congo vs. Kosovo ===
Congo
1
Tali Tennis Center, Helsinki, Finland
18 April 2019
Hard (indoor)

Kosovo
2

| | | | 1 | 2 | 3 |
|---|---|---|---|---|---|
| 1 | (Republic of the Congo) (Kosovo) | Gloire Mfoumouangana; Donika Bashota | 4; 6 | 2; 6 |
| 2 | (Republic of the Congo) (Kosovo) | Victoire Mfoumouangana; Arlinda Rushiti | 1; 6 | 2; 6 |
| 3 | (Republic of the Congo) (Kosovo) | Victoire Mfoumouangana / Anabel Ossombi; Vesa Gjinaj / Blearta Ukëhaxhaj | 6; 3 | 6; 3 |

=== Cyprus vs. North Macedonia ===
Cyprus
2
Tali Tennis Center, Helsinki, Finland
19 April 2019
Hard (indoor)

North Macedonia
1

| | | | 1 | 2 | 3 |
|---|---|---|---|---|---|
| 1 | (Cyprus) (North Macedonia) | Eleni Louka; Magdalena Stoilkovska | 6; 2 | 6; 0 |
| 2 | (Cyprus) (North Macedonia) | Raluca Șerban; Lina Gjorcheska | 6; 3 | 6; 2 |
| 3 | (Cyprus) (North Macedonia) | Maria Constantinou / Florentia Hadjigeorgiou; Ana Ristevska / Aleksandra Simeva | 2; 6 | 2; 6 |

=== Algeria vs. Congo ===
Algeria
3
Tali Tennis Center, Helsinki, Finland
19 April 2019
Hard (indoor)

Congo
0

| | | | 1 | 2 | 3 |
|---|---|---|---|---|---|
| 1 | (Algeria) (Republic of the Congo) | Inès Bekrar; Anabel Ossombi | 7; 5 | 7^{7} 6^{2} |
| 2 | (Algeria) (Republic of the Congo) | Yassamine Boudjadi; Victoire Mfoumouangana | 6; 2 | 6; 2 |
| 3 | (Algeria) (Republic of the Congo) | Inès Bekrar / Yassamine Boudjadi; Victoire Mfoumouangana / Anabel Ossombi | 6; 1 | 6; 1 |

== See also ==
- Fed Cup structure
