= Andrea Raaholt =

Norwegian tennis player

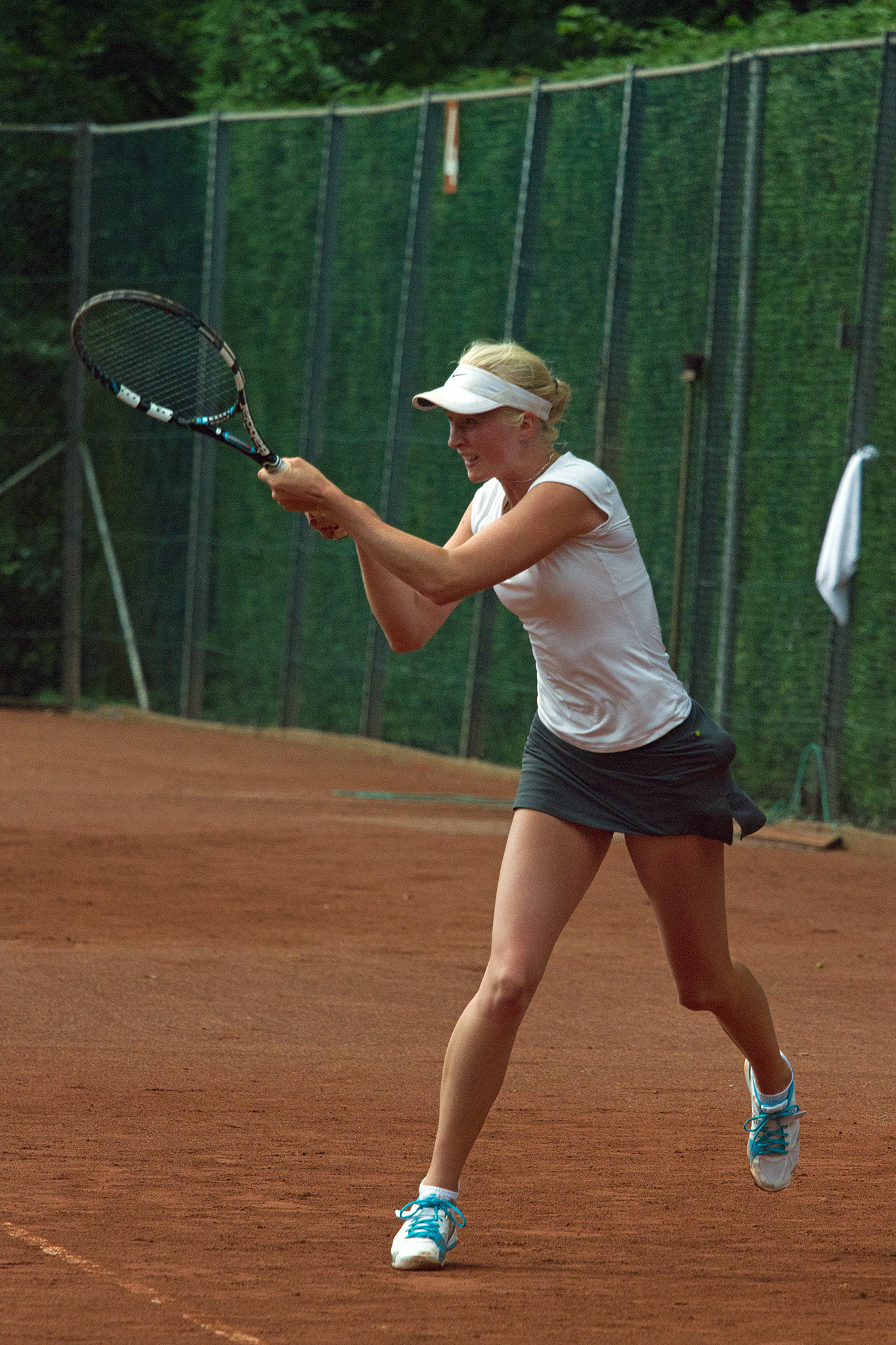
- Raaholt in 2015
- Country (sports): Norway
- Born: 17 April 1996 (age 29) Ålesund, Norway
- Plays: Right-handed
- Prize money: $4,777

Singles
- Career record: 44 - 47
- Highest ranking: No. 845 (26 September 2016)
- Current ranking: No. 908 (17 April 2017)

Doubles
- Career record: 3 - 8
- Highest ranking: No. 1130 (26 September 2016)
- Current ranking: No. 1143 (17 April 2017)

Team competitions
- Fed Cup: 3-1
- Last updated on: 19 April 2017.

Andrea Raaholt (born 17 April 1996 in Ålesund) is a Norwegian tennis player.

Raaholt has a WTA singles career high ranking of 845 achieved on 26 September 2016. She also has a WTA doubles career high ranking of 1130 also achieved on 26 September 2016.

Her mother and coach Amy Jönsson Raaholt also played on the pro tour.

She is a member of the Norway Fed Cup team and has a win–loss record in the Fed Cup of 3-1.

== ITF finals (0–1) ==
=== Doubles (0–1) ===
Legend
$100,000 tournaments
$75,000/$80,000 tournaments
$50,000/$60,000 tournaments
$25,000 tournaments
$10,000/$15,000 tournaments

Result	No.	Date	Category	Tournament	Surface	Partner	Opponents	Score
Runner-up	1.	$10,000	30 May 2016	Madrid, Spain	Clay	(Bosnia and Herzegovina) Jasmina Tinjić	(Mexico) Marcela Zacarías (Mexico) Renata Zarazúa	4–6, 4–6

== Fed Cup participation ==
=== Doubles ===
Edition	Stage	Date	Location	Against	Surface	Partner	Opponents	W/L	Score
2013 Fed Cup; Europe/Africa Zone Group III	R/R	9 May 2013	Chișinău, Moldova	Liechtenstein	Clay	(Norway) Melanie Stokke	Stephanie Vogt; Kathinka von Deichmann	L	0–6, 0–6
2013 Fed Cup; Europe/Africa Zone Group III	P/O	11 May 2013	Chișinău, Moldova	Namibia	Clay	(Norway) Melanie Stokke	Rieke Honiball; Liniques Theron	W	6–2, 6–4
2016 Fed Cup; Europe/Africa Zone Group III	R/R	11 April 2016	Ulcinj, Montenegro	Morocco	Clay	(Norway) Malene Helgø	Ghita Benhadi; Zaineb El Houari	W	6–3, 6–2
2016 Fed Cup; Europe/Africa Zone Group III	R/R	13 April 2016	Ulcinj, Montenegro	Kosovo	Clay	(Norway) Malene Helgø	Fiona Polloshka; Arlinda Rushiti	W	6–2, 6–1
