= Malene Helgø =

Norwegian tennis player (born 1999)

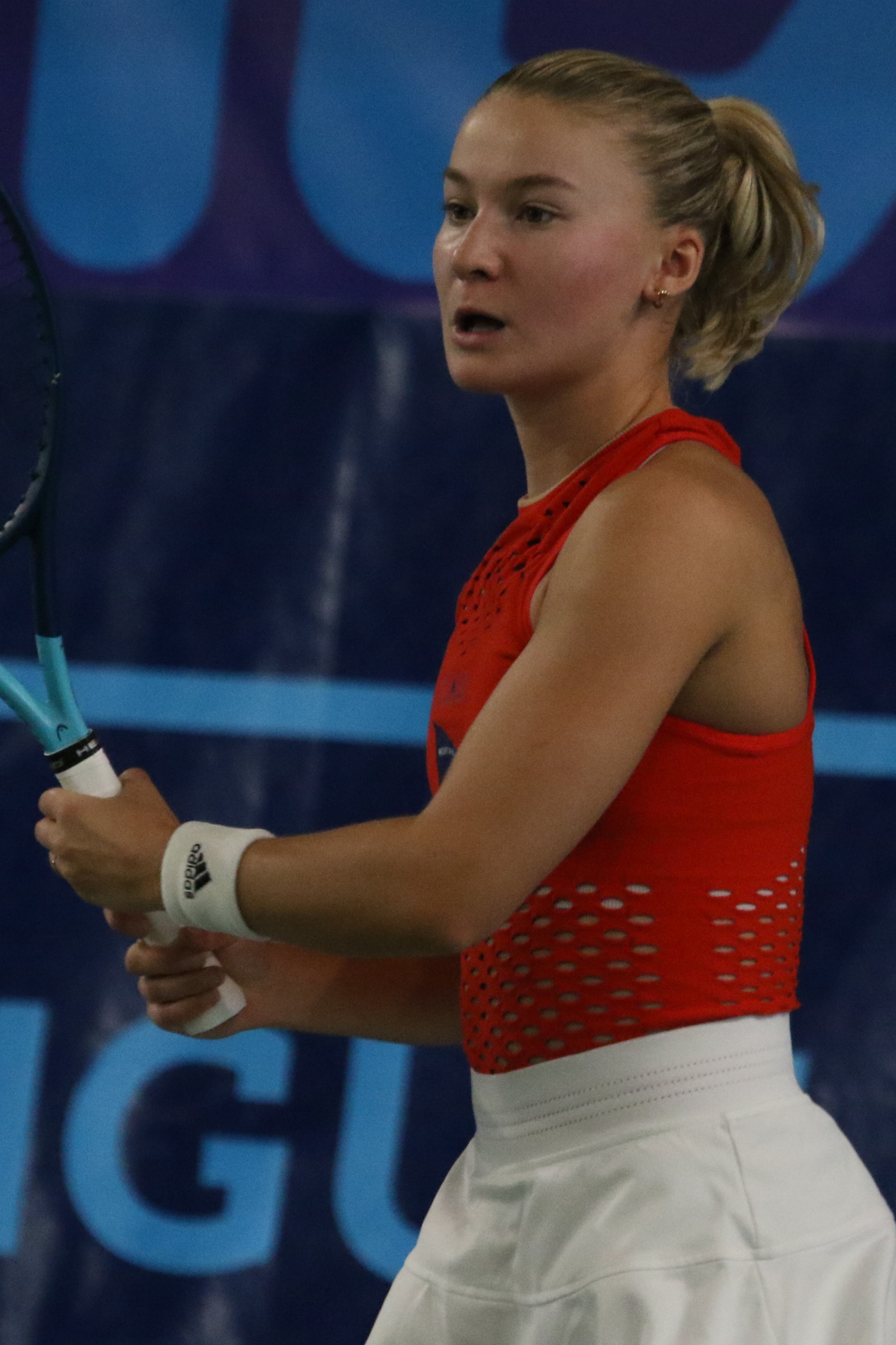
- Helgø at the 2021 ITF Poitiers
- Country (sports): Norway
- Residence: Fjellhamar, Norway
- Born: 26 August 1999 (age 27) Oslo, Norway
- Plays: Right (two-handed backhand)
- Prize money: $200,646

Singles
- Career record: 238–170
- Career titles: 9 ITF
- Highest ranking: No. 317 (30 January 2023)
- Current ranking: No. 1,153 (14 September 2026)

Doubles
- Career record: 102–64
- Career titles: 8 ITF
- Highest ranking: No. 323 (24 July 2023)
- Current ranking: No. 1,463 (14 September 2026)

Team competitions
- Fed Cup: 30–22
- Last updated on: 16 September 2026.

Malene Helgø (born 26 August 1999) is a Norwegian professional tennis player.

She has a career-high singles ranking of world No. 317, achieved on 30 January 2023. Her best doubles ranking is No. 323, reached on 24 July 2023. Helgø has won nine singles titles and eight doubles titles on the ITF Circuit.

On the ITF Junior Circuit, Helgø has been ranked as high as No. 29 in the world.

Playing for Norway in Billie Jean King Cup, Helgø has a win–loss record of 30–22 (as of August 2026).

== Juniors performance ==
=== Grand Slam tournaments ===
Singles:

- Australian Open: 1R (2017)
- French Open: 1R (2016)
- Wimbledon: 1R (2016)
- US Open: 2R (2016)

Doubles:

- Australian Open: QF (2017)
- French Open: 1R (2016)
- Wimbledon: QF (2016)
- US Open: 2R (2016)

== Professional ==
In 2023, Helgø made her WTA Tour debut representing Norway at the 2023 United Cup. She represented Norway at the 2023 United Cup and in as the number-one female player. She gained entry into the 2023 Swedish Open as an alternate, losing in the first round to Louisa Chirico. Helgø also took part in the 2024 United Cup, taking Caroline Garcia to a third set tiebreak in the quarterfinals.

== ITF Circuit finals ==
=== Singles: 13 (9 titles, 4 runner-ups) ===
Legend W25/35 tournaments (3–3) W15 tournaments (6–1)	Finals by surface Hard (4–0) Clay (5–4)

Result	W–L	Date	Tournament	Tier	Surface	Opponent	Score
Win	1–0	Jul 2018	ITF The Hague, Netherlands	W15	Clay	(Sweden) Ida Jarlskog	6–4, 4–6, 6–3
Win	2–0	Jul 2018	ITF Sandefjord, Norway	W15	Clay	(Germany) Lisa Ponomar	6–3, 4–6, 6–3
Win	3–0	Mar 2019	ITF Tabarka, Tunisia	W15	Clay	(Russia) Daria Lodikova	6–1, 3–6, 7–5
Loss	3–1	Jul 2019	ITF Sandefjord, Norway	W15	Clay	(Czech Republic) Michaela Bayerlová	7–5, 3–6, 3–6
Win	4–1	Sep 2020	ITF Varna, Bulgaria	W15	Clay	(Switzerland) Sebastianna Scilipoti	6–7^{(1)}, 6–3, 6–3
Loss	4–2	May 2021	Liepāja Open, Latvia	W25	Clay	(Latvia) Daniela Vismane	4–6, 4–6
Loss	4–3	Aug 2021	ITF Oldenzaal, Netherlands	W25	Clay	(South Korea) Jang Su-jeong	3–6, 2–6
Loss	4–4	May 2022	ITF Varberg, Sweden	W25	Clay	(Denmark) Sofia Samavati	6–2, 1–6, 4–6
Win	5–4	Nov 2022	ITF Haabneeme, Estonia	W25	Hard (i)	(Netherlands) Arantxa Rus	6–4, 6–2
Win	6–4	Jul 2023	ITF Périgueux, France	W25	Clay	(Greece) Sapfo Sakellaridi	6–3, 6–3
Win	7–4	Mar 2024	ITF Helsinki, Finland	W35	Hard (i)	(Serbia) Dejana Radanović	6–3, 6–2
Win	8–4	Mar 2024	ITF Sharm El Sheikh, Egypt	W15	Hard	(Luxembourg) Marie Weckerle	6–3, 6–2
Win	9–4	Mar 2024	ITF Sharm El Sheikh, Egypt	W15	Hard	(France) Julie Belgraver	6–1, 6–0

=== Doubles: 17 (8 titles, 9 runner-ups) ===
Legend W60/75 tournaments (1–2) W25/35 tournaments (1–0) W10/15 tournaments (6–7)	Finals by surface Hard (5–5) Clay (3–4)

Result	W–L	Date	Tournament	Tier	Surface	Partner	Opponents	Score
Loss	0–1	Nov 2015	ITF Oslo, Norway	W10	Hard (i)	(Norway) Astrid Wanja Brune Olsen	(Germany) Kim Grajdek (Russia) Ekaterina Yashina	2–6, 3–6
Loss	0–2	May 2016	ITF Bastad, Sweden	W10	Clay	(Norway) Astrid Wanja Brune Olsen	(Denmark) Emilie Francati (Sweden) Cornelia Lister	2–6, 2–6
Loss	0–3	Oct 2016	ITF Bol, Croatia	W10	Clay	(Croatia) Lea Bošković	(Croatia) Mariana Dražić (Hungary) Rebeka Stolmár	6–7^{(5)}, 6–7^{(5)}
Loss	0–4	Oct 2017	ITF Stockholm, Sweden	W15	Hard (i)	(Sweden) Fanny Östlund	(Russia) Anastasia Kulikova (Estonia) Elena Malygina	6–2, 7–5
Win	1–4	Nov 2017	ITF Stockholm, Sweden	W15	Hard (i)	(Sweden) Fanny Östlund	(Ukraine) Maryna Kolb (Ukraine) Nadiya Kolb	w/o
Loss	1–5	May 2018	ITF Karlskrona, Sweden	W15	Clay	(Norway) Astrid Wanja Brune Olsen	(Romania) Cristina Adamescu (Romania) Andreea Ghitescu	5–7, 5–7
Win	2–5	Jul 2018	ITF Sandefjord, Norway	W15	Clay	(Norway) Astrid Wanja Brune Olsen	(Germany) Nora Niedmers (Japan) Yukina Saigo	6–1, 6–4
Loss	2–6	Aug 2018	ITF Savitaipale, Finland	W15	Clay	(Norway) Astrid Wanja Brune Olsen	(Russia) Polina Bakhmutkina (Estonia) Elena Malõgina	4–6, 6–1, [5–10]
Loss	2–7	Feb 2019	ITF Sharm El Sheik, Egypt	W15	Hard	(Croatia) Mariana Dražić	(Czech Republic) Anastasia Dețiuc (Finland) Oona Orpana	0–6, 4–6
Win	3–7	Feb 2019	ITF Sharm El Sheik, Egypt	W15	Hard	(Croatia) Mariana Dražić	(Netherlands) Merel Hoedt (Netherlands) Noa Liauw a Fong	6–4, 6–3
Win	4–7	Jul 2019	ITF Sandefjord, Norway	W15	Clay	(Norway) Astrid Wanja Brune Olsen	(Netherlands) Suzan Lamens (Netherlands) Annick Melgers	6–3, 6–3
Win	5–7	Sep 2019	ITF Székesfehérvár, Hungary	W15	Clay	(Bosnia and Herzegovina) Nefisa Berberović	(Slovakia) Katarína Kužmová (Slovakia) Laura Svatiková	7–5, 6–1
Win	6–7	Dec 2019	ITF Monastir, Tunisia	W15	Hard	(Croatia) Mariana Dražić	(Spain) Yvonne Cavallé Reimers (Serbia) Bojana Marinković	7–6^{(4)}, 6–1
Loss	6–8	Oct 2022	Hamburg Ladies Cup, Germany	W60	Hard (i)	(Slovenia) Veronika Erjavec	(Czech Republic) Miriam Kolodziejová (Czech Republic) Jesika Malečková	4–6, 2–6
Win	7–8	Nov 2022	ITF Haabneeme, Estonia	W25	Hard (i)	(Netherlands) Suzan Lamens	(Slovenia) Dalila Jakupović (Netherlands) Arantxa Rus	6–2, 6–1
Loss	7–9	Feb 2025	Brisbane QCT International, Australia	W75	Hard	(France) Tessah Andrianjafitrimo	(Japan) Miho Kuramochi (China) Zheng Wushuang	6–7^{(6)}, 3–6
Win	8–9	Jul 2025	Open Araba en Femenino, Spain	W75	Hard	(China) Shi Han	(France) Nahia Berecoechea (Bulgaria) Isabella Shinikova	6–3, 6–3

== Team competitions ==
=== Billie Jean King Cup ===
==== Singles (13–11) ====
Edition	Stage	Date	Location	Against	Surface	Opponent	W/L	Score
2016	Z3 R/R	14 Apr 2016	Ulcinj (MNE)	Mozambique	Clay	Marieta de Lyubov Nhamitambo	W	6–1, 6–1
2017	Z2 R/R	19 Apr 2017	Šiauliai (LIT)	South Africa	Hard (i)	Ilze Hattingh	W	6–1, 6–1
2017	Z2 R/R	20 Apr 2017	Šiauliai (LIT)	Sweden	Hard (i)	Cornelia Lister	L	4–6, 0–6
2017	Z2 P/O	22 Apr 2017	Šiauliai (LIT)	Lithuania	Hard (i)	Paulina Bakaitė	W	6–3, 7–6^{(4)}
2018	Z2 R/R	18 Apr 2018	Athens (GRE)	Israel	Clay	Julia Glushko	L	6–4, 3–6, 1–6
2018	Z2 R/R	19 Apr 2018	Athens (GRE)	Luxembourg	Clay	Mandy Minella	L	6–4, 3–6, 3–6
2018	Z2 R/R	20 Apr 2018	Athens (GRE)	(Bosnia and Herzegovina) BiH	Clay	Dea Herdželaš	L	4–6, 2–6
2019	Z3 R/R	18 Apr 2019	Ulcinj (MNE)	Armenia	Clay	Evelina Martirosyan	W	6–0, 6–0
2019	Z3 R/R	19 Apr 2019	Ulcinj (MNE)	Montenegro	Clay	Anja Drašković	W	6–1, 3–6, 6–4
2019	Z3 P/O	20 Apr 2019	Ulcinj (MNE)	Egypt	Clay	Mayar Sherif	L	1–6, 1–6
2020–21	Z3 R/R	15 Jun 2021	Vilnius (LIT)	Albania	Hard	Kristal Dule	W	6–0, 6–1
2020–21	Z3 R/R	17 Jun 2021	Vilnius (LIT)	North Macedonia	Hard	Katarina Marinkovikj	W	6–0, 6–0
2020–21	Z3 P/O	19 Jun 2021	Vilnius (LIT)	(Bosnia and Herzegovina) BiH	Hard	Nefisa Berberović	W	6–0, 6–4
2022	Z2 R/R	12 Apr 2022	Vierumäki (FIN)	Egypt	Hard (i)	Sandra Samir	W	7–6^{(7)}, 6–0
2022	Z2 R/R	13 Apr 2022	Vierumäki (FIN)	Greece	Hard (i)	Michaela Laki	W	6–4, 6–1
2022	Z2 P/O	15 April 2022	Vierumäki (FIN)	Israel	Hard (i)	Nicole Khirin	W	6–7^{(1)}, 6–4, 6–2

==== Doubles (13–5) ====
Edition	Stage	Date	Location	Against	Surface	Partner	Opponents	W/L	Score
2016	Z3 R/R	11 Apr 2016	Ulcinj (MNE)	Morocco	Clay	Andrea Raaholt	Ghita Benhadi; Zaineb El Houari	W	6–3, 6–2
2016	Z3 R/R	13 Apr 2016	Ulcinj (MNE)	Kosovo	Clay	Andrea Raaholt	Fiona Polloshka; Arlinda Rushiti	W	6–2, 6–1
2017	Z2 R/R	20 Apr 2017	Šiauliai (LIT)	Sweden	Hard (i)	Astrid Wanja Brune Olsen	Jacqueline Cabaj Awad; Kajsa Rinaldo Persson	L	2–6, 2–6
2017	Z2 R/R	21 Apr 2017	Šiauliai (LIT)	Slovenia	Hard (i)	Caroline Rohde-Moe	Dalila Jakupović; Andreja Klepač	W	1–0 ret.
2018	Z2 R/R	18 Apr 2018	Athens (GRE)	Israel	Clay	Astrid Wanja Brune Olsen	Julia Glushko; Lina Glushko	W	4–6, 6–3, 7–6^{(3)}
2018	Z2 R/R	19 Apr 2018	Athens (GRE)	Luxembourg	Clay	Lilly Elida Håseth	Tiffany Cornelius; Claudine Schaul	L	5–7, 1–6
2018	Z2 R/R	20 Apr 2018	Athens (GRE)	(Bosnia and Herzegovina) BiH	Clay	Astrid Wanja Brune Olsen	Dea Herdželas; Jelena Simić	L	0–6, 2–6
2019	Z3 R/R	18 Apr 2019	Ulcinj (MNE)	Armenia	Clay	Astrid Wanja Brune Olsen	Yeva Avetisyan; Irena Muradyan	W	6–0, 6–3
2019	Z3 R/R	19 Apr 2019	Ulcinj (MNE)	Montenegro	Clay	Astrid Wanja Brune Olsen	Anja Drašković; Divna Ratković	W	6–0, 6–1
2019	Z3 P/O	20 Apr 2019	Ulcinj (MNE)	(Bosnia and Herzegovina) BiH	Clay	Astrid Wanja Brune Olsen	Mayar Sherif; Rana Sherif Ahmed	L	5–7, 3–6
2020–21	Z3 R/R	15 Jun 2021	Vilnius (LIT)	Armenia	Hard	Ulrikke Eikeri	Yeva Avetisyan; Irena Muradyan	W	6–0, 6–0
2020–21	Z3 R/R	17 Jun 2021	Vilnius (LIT)	North Macedonia	Hard	Ulrikke Eikeri	Katarina Marinkovikj; Aleksandra Simeva	W	6–2, 6–0
2022	Z2 R/R	12 Apr 2022	Vierumäki (FIN)	Egypt	Hard (i)	Ulrikke Eikeri	Rana Sherif Ahmed; Mayar Sherif	W	6–1, 4–6, 6–2
2022	Z2 R/R	13 Apr 2022	Vierumäki (FIN)	Greece	Hard (i)	Ulrikke Eikeri	Eleni Christofi; Despina Papamichail	L	7–5, 4–6, 3–6
2022	Z2 P/O	15 Apr 2022	Vierumäki (FIN)	Israel	Hard (i)	Ulrikke Eikeri	Lina Glushko; Shavit Kimchi	W	6–2, 7–5

=== United Cup (0–7) ===
Group membership United Cup (0–9)	Matches by surface Hard (0–7)	Matches by type Singles (0–7)	Matches by setting Outdoors (0–7)

Outcome	No.	Surface	Match type (partner)	Opponent nation	Opponent player(s)	Score
2023
29 December–8 January; Pat Rafter Arena, Brisbane, Australia; Group stage
Loss	1.	Hard	Singles	Brazil	(Brazil) Beatriz Haddad Maia	4–6, 2–6
Loss	2.	Hard	Singles	Italy	(Italy) Martina Trevisan	5–7, 6–3, 4–6
2024
29 December–7 January; Ken Rosewall Arena, Sydney, Australia; Group stage
Loss	1.	Hard	Singles	Netherlands	(Netherlands) Arantxa Rus	6–7^{(4)}, 1–6
Loss	2.	Hard	Singles	Croatia	(Croatia) Donna Vekić	5–7, 6–3, 3–6
29 December–7 January; Ken Rosewall Arena, Sydney, Australia; Quarterfinals
Loss	QF	Hard	Singles	France	(France) Caroline Garcia	2–6, 7–6^{(6)}, 6–7^{(5)}
2025
27 December–5 January; Ken Rosewall Arena, Sydney, Australia; Group stage
Loss	1.	Hard	Singles	Czech Republic	(Czech Republic) Karolína Muchová	2–6, 2–6
Loss	2.	Hard	Singles	Poland	(Poland) Iga Świątek	1–6, 0–6
