= 2016 Fed Cup Europe/Africa Zone Group III – Pool D =

International tennis competition

Pool D of the 2016 Fed Cup Europe/Africa Group III was one of four pools in the Europe/Africa Group III of the 2016 Fed Cup. Five teams competed in a round robin competition, with the top team and bottom teams proceeding to their respective sections of the play-offs: the top team played for advancement to Group II.

== Standings ==
| | | MNE | NOR | MAR | KOS | MOZ | RR; W–L | Set; W–L | Game; W–L | Standings |
| 72 | Montenegro | | 1–2 | 2–1 | 3–0 | 3–0 | 3–1 | 20–6 | 141–70 | 2 |
| 79 | Norway | 2–1 | | 3–0 | 3–0 | 3–0 | 4–0 | 22–3 | 139–51 | 1 |
| 90 | Morocco | 1–2 | 0–3 | | 2–1 | 3–0 | 2–2 | 12–13 | 103–90 | 3 |
| NR | Kosovo | 0–3 | 0–3 | 1–2 | | 3–0 | 1–3 | 8–16 | 65–110 | 4 |
| 96 | Mozambique | 0–3 | 0–3 | 0–3 | 0–3 | | 0–4 | 0–24 | 17–144 | 5 |

== Round-robin ==
=== Montenegro vs. Kosovo ===
Montenegro
3
Bellevue, Ulcinj, Montenegro
11 April 2016
Outdoor clay

Kosovo
0

| | | | 1 | 2 | 3 |
|---|---|---|---|---|---|
| 1 | (Montenegro) (Kosovo) | Anja Drašković; Arlinda Rushiti | 6; 1 | 6; 4 |
| 2 | (Montenegro) (Kosovo) | Ana Veselinović; Edita Raca | 6; 0 | 6; 2 |
| 3 | (Montenegro) (Kosovo) | Danka Kovinić / Ana Veselinović; Anduena Latifi / Arlinda Rushiti | 6; 1 | 6; 0 |

=== Norway vs. Morocco ===
Norway
3
Bellevue, Ulcinj, Montenegro
11 April 2016
Outdoor clay

Morocco
0

| | | | 1 | 2 | 3 |
|---|---|---|---|---|---|
| 1 | (Norway) (Morocco) | Melanie Stokke; Diae El Jardi | 6; 3 | 6; 2 |
| 2 | (Norway) (Morocco) | Ulrikke Eikeri; Rita Atik | 6; 0 | 6; 1 |
| 3 | (Norway) (Morocco) | Malene Helgø / Andrea Raaholt; Ghita Benhadi / Zaineb El Houari | 6; 3 | 6; 2 |

=== Montenegro vs. Norway ===
Montenegro
1
Bellevue, Ulcinj, Montenegro
12 April 2016
Outdoor clay

Norway
2

| | | | 1 | 2 | 3 |
|---|---|---|---|---|---|
| 1 | (Montenegro) (Norway) | Anja Drašković; Melanie Stokke | 2; 6 | 1; 6 |
| 2 | (Montenegro) (Norway) | Danka Kovinić; Ulrikke Eikeri | 6; 1 | 6; 0 |
| 3 | (Montenegro) (Norway) | Danka Kovinić / Ana Veselinović; Ulrikke Eikeri / Melanie Stokke | 5; 7 | 6; 4 | 6^{6} 7^{8} |

=== Morocco vs. Mozambique ===
Morocco
3
Bellevue, Ulcinj, Montenegro
12 April 2016
Outdoor clay

Mozambique
0

| | | | 1 | 2 | 3 |
|---|---|---|---|---|---|
| 1 | (Morocco) (Mozambique) | Diae El Jardi; Marieta de Lyubov Nhamitambo | 6; 1 | 6; 0 |
| 2 | (Morocco) (Mozambique) | Rita Atik; Cláudia Sumaia | 6; 0 | 6; 0 |
| 3 | (Morocco) (Mozambique) | Ghita Benhadi / Zaineb El Houari; Erica Nicole Monjane Dias / Cláudia Sumaia | 6; 0 | 6; 0 |

=== Norway vs. Kosovo ===
Norway
3
Bellevue, Ulcinj, Montenegro
13 April 2016
Outdoor clay

Kosovo
0

| | | | 1 | 2 | 3 |
|---|---|---|---|---|---|
| 1 | (Norway) (Kosovo) | Melanie Stokke; Arlinda Rushiti | 6; 0 | 6; 2 |
| 2 | (Norway) (Kosovo) | Ulrikke Eikeri; Edita Raca | 6; 0 | 6; 0 |
| 3 | (Norway) (Kosovo) | Malene Helgø / Andrea Raaholt; Fiona Polloshka / Arlinda Rushiti | 6; 2 | 6; 1 |

=== Montenegro vs. Mozambique ===
Montenegro
3
Bellevue, Ulcinj, Montenegro
13 April 2016
Outdoor clay

Mozambique
0

| | | | 1 | 2 | 3 |
|---|---|---|---|---|---|
| 1 | (Montenegro) (Mozambique) | Anja Drašković; Marieta de Lyubov Nhamitambo | 6; 0 | 6; 0 |
| 2 | (Montenegro) (Mozambique) | Ana Veselinović; Cláudia Sumaia | 6; 1 | 6; 1 |
| 3 | (Montenegro) (Mozambique) | Anja Drašković / Edisa Hot; Erica Nicole Monjane Dias / Cláudia Sumaia | 6; 0 | 6; 0 |

=== Morocco vs. Kosovo ===
Morocco
2
Bellevue, Ulcinj, Montenegro
14 April 2016
Outdoor clay

Kosovo
1

| | | | 1 | 2 | 3 |
|---|---|---|---|---|---|
| 1 | (Morocco) (Kosovo) | Ghita Benhadi; Arlinda Rushiti | 2; 6 | 1; 6 |
| 2 | (Morocco) (Kosovo) | Rita Atik; Edita Raca | 6; 1 | 6; 1 |
| 3 | (Morocco) (Kosovo) | Rita Atik / Zaineb El Houari; Edita Raca / Arlinda Rushiti | 6; 2 | 6; 0 |

=== Norway vs. Mozambique ===
Norway
3
Bellevue, Ulcinj, Montenegro
14 April 2016
Outdoor clay

Mozambique
0

| | | | 1 | 2 | 3 |
|---|---|---|---|---|---|
| 1 | (Norway) (Mozambique) | Malene Helgø; Marieta de Lyubov Nhamitambo | 6; 1 | 6; 1 |
| 2 | (Norway) (Mozambique) | Ulrikke Eikeri; Cláudia Sumaia | 6; 0 | 6; 0 |
| 3 | (Norway) (Mozambique) | Ulrikke Eikeri / Melanie Stokke; Marieta de Lyubov Nhamitambo / Cláudia Sumaia | 6; 0 | 6; 1 |

=== Montenegro vs. Morocco ===
Montenegro
2
Bellevue, Ulcinj, Montenegro
15 April 2016
Outdoor clay

Morocco
1

| | | | 1 | 2 | 3 |
|---|---|---|---|---|---|
| 1 | (Montenegro) (Morocco) | Anja Drašković; Ghita Benhadi | 5; 7 | 7^{7} 6^{4} | 1; 6 |
| 2 | (Montenegro) (Morocco) | Danka Kovinić; Rita Atik | 6; 2 | 6; 1 |
| 3 | (Montenegro) (Morocco) | Danka Kovinić / Ana Veselinović; Rita Atik / Diae El Jardi | 6; 3 | 6; 4 |

=== Kosovo vs. Mozambique ===
Kosovo
3
Bellevue, Ulcinj, Montenegro
15 April 2016
Outdoor clay

Mozambique
0

| | | | 1 | 2 | 3 |
|---|---|---|---|---|---|
| 1 | (Kosovo) (Mozambique) | Arlinda Rushiti; Marieta de Lyubov Nhamitambo | 6; 1 | 6; 2 |
| 2 | (Kosovo) (Mozambique) | Edita Raca; Cláudia Sumaia | 6; 3 | 6; 2 |
| 3 | (Kosovo) (Mozambique) | Edita Raca / Arlinda Rushiti; Marieta de Lyubov Nhamitambo / Cláudia Sumaia | 6; 3 | 6; 0 |

== See also ==
- Fed Cup structure
