= 2021 Billie Jean King Cup Europe/Africa Zone Group III – Pool C =

Subsection of tennis competition

Pool C of the 2021 Billie Jean King Cup Europe/Africa Group III was one of six pools in the Europe/Africa Group III of the 2020–21 Billie Jean King Cup. Three teams competed in a round robin competition, with the top team and bottom teams proceeding to their respective section of the play-offs: the top team played for advancement to Group II.

== Standings ==
		LTU	NGR	KOS	RR; W–L	Set; W–L	Game; W–L	Standings
3	Lithuania		3–0	3–0	6–0	12–1 (92%)	77–36 (68%)	1
–	Nigeria	0–3		3–0	3–3	7–7 (50%)	64–57 (52%)	2
7	Kosovo	0–3	0–3		0–6	1–12 (7%)	28–76 (27%)	3

Standings are determined by: 1. number of wins; 2. if two teams have the same number of wins, head-to-head record; 3. if three teams have the same number of wins, (a) number of matches won in the group, then (b) percentage of sets won in the group, then (c) percentage of games won in the group, then (d) Billie Jean King Cup rankings.

== Round robin ==
=== Lithuania vs. Nigeria ===
Lithuania
3
SEB Arena, Vilnius, Lithuania
15 June 2021
Hard (indoor)

Nigeria
0

			1	2	3
1	(Lithuania) (Nigeria)	Iveta Dapkutė; Adesuwa Osabuohien	4; 6	6; 2	6; 4
2	(Lithuania) (Nigeria)	Justina Mikulskytė; Oyinlomo Quadre	6; 2	6; 1
3	(Lithuania) (Nigeria)	Klaudija Bubelytė / Patricija Paukštytė; Adesuwa Osabuohien / Oyinlomo Quadre	6; 4	7; 5

=== Kosovo vs. Nigeria ===
Kosovo
0
SEB Arena, Vilnius, Lithuania
16 June 2021
Hard (indoor)

Nigeria
3

			1	2	3
1	(Kosovo) (Nigeria)	Donika Bashota; Adesuwa Osabuohien	1; 6	4; 6
2	(Kosovo) (Nigeria)	Adrijana Lekaj; Oyinlomo Quadre	2; 6	6; 4	0; 6
3	(Kosovo) (Nigeria)	Donika Bashota / Adrijana Lekaj; Adesuwa Osabuohien / Oyinlomo Quadre	2; 6	1; 6

=== Lithuania vs. Kosovo ===
Lithuania
3
SEB Arena, Vilnius, Lithuania
17 June 2021
Hard (indoor)

Kosovo
0

			1	2	3
1	(Lithuania) (Kosovo)	Akvilė Paražinskaitė; Donika Bashota	6; 4	6; 4
2	(Lithuania) (Kosovo)	Justina Mikulskytė; Adrijana Lekaj	6; 2	6; 1
3	(Lithuania) (Kosovo)	Iveta Dapkutė / Patricija Paukštytė; Aja Broqi / Vesa Gjinaj	6; 0	6; 1

== See also ==
- Billie Jean King Cup structure
