= 2018 Fed Cup Europe/Africa Zone Group III – Pool B (Tunis) =

Subsection of tennis competition

Pool B (Tunis) of the 2018 Fed Cup Europe/Africa Group III was one of four pools in the Europe/Africa Group III of the 2018 Fed Cup. Five teams competed in a round robin competition, with the top team and bottom teams proceeding to their respective section of the play-offs: the top team played for advancement to Group II.

== Standings ==
		TUN	CYP	ALG	KOS	MAD	RR; W–L	Set; W–L	Game; W–L	Standings
8	Tunisia		3–0	3–0	3–0	3–0	4–0	24–1 (96%)	149–53 (74%)	1
2	Cyprus	0–3		2–1	2–1	2–1	3–1	15–13 (54%)	124–123 (50%)	2
10	Algeria	0–3	1–2		2–1	2–1	2–2	10–14 (42%)	101–113 (47%)	3
15	Kosovo	0–3	1–2	1–2		2–1	1–3	10–18 (36%)	95–135 (41%)	4
12	Madagascar	0–3	1–2	1–2	1–2		0–4	7–20 (26%)	94–139 (40%)	5

Standings are determined by: 1. number of wins; 2. if two teams have the same number of wins, head-to-head record; 3. if three teams have the same number of wins, (a) number of matches won in the group, then (b) percentage of sets won in the group, then (c) percentage of games won in the group, then (d) Fed Cup rankings.

== Round robin ==
=== Cyprus vs. Algeria ===
Cyprus
2
Cité Nationale Sportive, Tunis, Tunisia
16 April
Hard

Algeria
1

			1	2	3
1	(Cyprus) (Algeria)	Florentia Hadjigeorgiou; Yassamine Boudjadi	1; 6	3; 6
2	(Cyprus) (Algeria)	Eleni Louka; Amira Benaissa	7^{7} 6^{5}	6; 2
3	(Cyprus) (Algeria)	Eleni Louka / Eleni Makride; Amira Benaissa / Yassamine Boudjadi	6; 4	7^{7} 6^{3}

=== Madagascar vs. Kosovo ===
Madagascar
1
Cité Nationale Sportive, Tunis, Tunisia
16 April
Hard

Kosovo
2

			1	2	3
1	(Madagascar) (Kosovo)	Manuela Robinson; Liridona Murati	6; 2	4; 6	6; 2
2	(Madagascar) (Kosovo)	Iariniaina Tsantaniony; Arlinda Rushiti	1; 6	2; 6
3	(Madagascar) (Kosovo)	Fitia Ravoniandro / Manuela Robinson; Arlinda Rushiti / Blearta Ukëhaxhaj	6^{5} 7^{7}	6; 3	3; 6

=== Cyprus vs. Madagascar ===
Cyprus
2
Cité Nationale Sportive, Tunis, Tunisia
17 April
Hard

Madagascar
1

			1	2	3
1	(Cyprus) (Madagascar)	Florentia Hadjigeorgiou; Fitia Ravoniandro	6; 1	6; 2
2	(Cyprus) (Madagascar)	Eleni Louka; Iariniaina Tsantaniony	6; 3	6; 3
3	(Cyprus) (Madagascar)	Lygia Christodoulou / Eleni Makride; Fitia Ravoniandro / Manuela Robinson	6; 3	6^{3} 7^{7}	5; 7

=== Tunisia vs. Kosovo ===
Tunisia
3
Cité Nationale Sportive, Tunis, Tunisia
17 April
Hard

Kosovo
0

			1	2	3
1	(Tunisia) (Kosovo)	Chiraz Bechri; Liridona Murati	6; 0	6; 0
2	(Tunisia) (Kosovo)	Ons Jabeur; Arlinda Rushiti	6; 3	6; 3
3	(Tunisia) (Kosovo)	Ferdaous Bahri / Mouna Bouzgarrou; Liridona Murati / Blearta Ukëhaxhaj	6; 1	6; 1

=== Cyprus vs. Kosovo ===
Cyprus
2
Cité Nationale Sportive, Tunis, Tunisia
18 April
Hard

Kosovo
1

			1	2	3
1	(Cyprus) (Kosovo)	Florentia Hadjigeorgiou; Blearta Ukëhaxhaj	6; 2	6; 0
2	(Cyprus) (Kosovo)	Eleni Louka; Arlinda Rushiti	6; 4	2; 6	2; 6
3	(Cyprus) (Kosovo)	Eleni Louka / Eleni Makride; Liridona Murati / Arlinda Rushiti	6; 2	3; 6	6; 1

=== Tunisia vs. Algeria ===
Tunisia
3
Cité Nationale Sportive, Tunis, Tunisia
18 April
Hard

Algeria
0

			1	2	3
1	(Tunisia) (Algeria)	Chiraz Bechri; Yassamine Boudjadi	6; 3	6; 3
2	(Tunisia) (Algeria)	Ons Jabeur; Amira Benaissa	6; 1	6; 3
3	(Tunisia) (Algeria)	Ferdaous Bahri / Mouna Bouzgarrou; Amira Benaissa / Yassamine Boudjadi	6; 4	7; 5

=== Tunisia vs. Madagascar ===
Tunisia
3
Cité Nationale Sportive, Tunis, Tunisia
19 April
Hard

Madagascar
0

			1	2	3
1	(Tunisia) (Madagascar)	Chiraz Bechri; Manuela Robinson	2; 2			retired
2	(Tunisia) (Madagascar)	Ons Jabeur; Iariniaina Tsantaniony	6; 0	6; 2
3	(Tunisia) (Madagascar)	Ferdaous Bahri / Mouna Bouzgarrou; Fitia Ravoniandro / Iariniaina Tsantaniony	6; 2	6; 4

=== Algeria vs. Kosovo ===
Algeria
2
Cité Nationale Sportive, Tunis, Tunisia
19 April
Hard

Kosovo
1

			1	2	3
1	(Algeria) (Kosovo)	Yassamine Boudjadi; Liridona Murati	5; 1			retired
2	(Algeria) (Kosovo)	Amira Benaissa; Arlinda Rushiti	3; 6	0; 4		retired
3	(Algeria) (Kosovo)	Lynda Benkaddour / Yassamine Boudjadi; Arlinda Rushiti / Blearta Ukëhaxhaj	6; 4	7; 5

=== Cyprus vs. Tunisia ===
Cyprus
0
Cité Nationale Sportive, Tunis, Tunisia
20 April
Hard

Tunisia
3

			1	2	3
1	(Cyprus) (Tunisia)	Florentia Hadjigeorgiou; Chiraz Bechri	1; 6	2; 6
2	(Cyprus) (Tunisia)	Eleni Louka; Ons Jabeur	2; 6	0; 6
3	(Cyprus) (Tunisia)	Eleni Louka / Eleni Makride; Ferdaous Bahri / Mouna Bouzgarrou	6; 4	2; 6	3; 6

=== Algeria vs. Madagascar ===
Algeria
2
Cité Nationale Sportive, Tunis, Tunisia
20 April
Hard

Madagascar
1

			1	2	3
1	(Algeria) (Madagascar)	Lynda Benkaddour; Fitia Ravoniandro	6; 4	6; 3
2	(Algeria) (Madagascar)	Amira Benaissa; Iariniaina Tsantaniony	6; 3	6; 2
3	(Algeria) (Madagascar)	Lynda Benakddour / Yassamine Boudjadi; Fitia Ravoniandro / Iariniaina Tsantaniony				w/o

== See also ==
- Fed Cup structure
