= 2025 United Cup =

- Date: 27 December 2024 – 5 January 2025
- Edition: 3rd
- Category: United Cup
- Draw: 18 teams
- Prize money: US$11,170,000
- Surface: Hard / outdoor
- Location: Perth, Western Australia; Sydney, New South Wales, Australia
- Venue: RAC Arena; Ken Rosewall Arena

Champions
- United States
- United Cup

The 2025 United Cup was the third edition of the United Cup, an international outdoor hard court mixed-gender team tennis tournament held by the Association of Tennis Professionals (ATP) and the Women's Tennis Association (WTA). Serving as the opener for the 2025 ATP Tour and the 2025 WTA Tour, it was held from 27 December 2024 to 5 January 2025 at two venues in the Australian cities of Perth and Sydney. It offered both ATP rankings and WTA rankings points to its players: a player was able to win a maximum of 500 points.

Team United States won their second title, after defeating Team Poland 2–0 in the final. Team Germany was the defending champion, but were defeated in the quarterfinals by Team Kazakhstan.

== Format ==
Both cities hosted three groups of three countries in a round robin format. Each tie consisted of one men's and one women's singles match, and one mixed doubles match.

The six group winners and the best runner-up in each city advanced to the quarterfinals.

== Qualification ==
18 countries qualified as follows:

- Five countries qualified based on the ATP ranking of their number one ranked singles player.
- Five countries qualified based on the WTA ranking of their number one ranked singles player.
- Eight countries qualified based on the combined ranking of their number one ranked ATP and WTA players.

In exchange for being the host nation, Australia was guaranteed one of the spots reserved for teams with the best combined ranking if it would have failed to qualify on its own.

Teams featured up to three players from each tour.

== Venues ==
Perth and Sydney each hosted three groups of three countries in a round robin format and two quarterfinals. Sydney hosted the semifinals and the final on the last two days of the tournament.

Image	Name	Opened	Capacity	Location	Events	Map
	RAC Arena	2012	15,500	Perth, Western Australia	Group stage, Quarterfinals	2025 United Cup is located in Australia
	Ken Rosewall Arena	1999	10,500	Sydney, New South Wales	Group stage, Quarterfinals, Semifinals, Final	2025 United Cup is located in Australia

== Point and prize money distribution ==
=== Ranking points ===
==== ATP ====
Round	Points per win vs. opponent ranked						
Round	No. 1–10	No. 11–20	No. 21–30	No. 31–50	No. 51–100	No. 101–250	No. 251+
Final	180	140	120	90	60	40	35
Semifinals	130	105	90	60	40	35	25
Quarterfinals	80	65	55	40	35	25	20
Group stage	55	45	40	35	25	20	15

- Maximum 500 points

==== WTA ====
Number of match wins	Ranking points
5 match wins	500
4 match wins	325
3 match wins	150
2 match wins (1 of 2 from QF, SF or F)	108
2 match wins (round robin)	90
1 match win (QF, SF or F)	60
1 match win (round robin)	32
0 match wins	1

- Maximum 500 points

=== Prize money ===
The 2025 United Cup had a total prize money pool of US$11,170,000. The distribution was split into three components: participation fee, match wins, and team wins.

==== Participation fee ====
Singles ranking	Number 1 player	Number 2 player	Number 3 player
No. 1–10	$230,000	$210,000	$33,000
No. 11–20	$115,000	$105,000	$33,000
No. 21–30	$69,000	$52,500	$33,000
No. 31–50	$46,000	$31,500	$16,500
No. 51–100	$34,500	$21,000	$16,500
No. 101–250	$28,750	$15,750	$8,250
No. 251+	$23,000	$10,500	$6,600

==== Match wins ====
Round	Number 1 player	Mixed doubles
Final	$280,250	$52,800
Semifinals	$147,500	$27,650
Quarterfinals	$77,600	$14,550
Group stage	$42,800	$8,000

==== Team wins ====
Round	$ per player
Final	$25,850
Semifinals	$15,250
Quarterfinals	$8,950
Group stage	$5,600

== Entries ==
16 countries qualified based on the ATP/WTA rankings on 14 October 2024 and players' commitment to play at the event. The remaining two teams qualified based on the ATP/WTA rankings on 18 November 2024.

The first 16 qualified countries, the best 5 by ATP ranking, the best 5 by WTA ranking, plus the best 6 in combined rankings were announced on 18 October 2024. The last 2 qualified countries, the 7th and 8th by combined rankings, were announced on 3 November 2024.

Seed	Nation	Crit.	No. 1 ATP	Rank	No. 1 WTA	Rank	No. 2 ATP	No. 2 WTA	Doubles ATP	Doubles WTA	Captain	Nat.
1	United States	WTA #2	Taylor Fritz	4	Coco Gauff	3	Denis Kudla	Danielle Collins	Robert Galloway	Desirae Krawczyk	Michael Russell	(United States)
2	Poland	WTA #1	Hubert Hurkacz	16	Iga Świątek	2	Kamil Majchrzak	Maja Chwalińska	Jan Zieliński	Alicja Rosolska	Mateusz Terczyński	(Poland)
3	Greece	ATP #4	Stefanos Tsitsipas	11	Maria Sakkari	32	Stefanos Sakellaridis	Despina Papamichail	Petros Tsitsipas	Valentini Grammatikopoulou	Theodoros Angelinos	(Greece)
4	Italy	WTA #4	Flavio Cobolli	32	Jasmine Paolini	4	Matteo Gigante	Sara Errani	Andrea Vavassori	Angelica Moratelli	Renzo Furlan	(Italy)
5	China	WTA #5	Zhang Zhizhen	45	Gao Xinyu (Note: Replacement for a withdrawn player)	175	Bai Yan	Zhang Shuai	Sun Fajing	—	Wu Di	(China)
6	Great Britain	Comb #2	Billy Harris	125	Katie Boulter	24	Jan Choinski	Lily Miyazaki	Charles Broom	Olivia Nicholls	Alexander Ward	(United Kingdom)
7	Canada	Comb #3	Félix Auger-Aliassime	29	Leylah Fernandez	31	Liam Draxl	Stacey Fung	Benjamin Sigouin	Ariana Arseneault	Félix Auger-Aliassime	(Canada)
8	Czech Republic	Comb #1	Tomáš Macháč	25	Karolína Muchová	9^{PR(22)}	Marek Gengel	Gabriela Knutson	Patrik Rikl	Vendula Valdmannová (Note: 3rd singles player instead of doubles)	Daniel Vacek	(Czech Republic)
9	Kazakhstan	WTA #3	Alexander Shevchenko	78	Elena Rybakina	6	Dmitry Popko	Zhibek Kulambayeva	Aleksandr Nedovyesov	—	Aleksandr Nedovyesov	(Kazakhstan)
10	France	ATP #5	Ugo Humbert	14	Chloé Paquet	123	Corentin Moutet	Léolia Jeanjean	Édouard Roger-Vasselin	Elixane Lechemia	Fabrice Martin	(France)
11	Germany	ATP #1	Alexander Zverev	2	Laura Siegemund	80	Daniel Masur	Lena Papadakis	Tim Pütz	Vivian Heisen	Alexander Zverev Sr.	(Germany)
12	Australia	ATP #3	Alex de Minaur	9	Olivia Gadecki	97	Omar Jasika	Destanee Aiava	Matthew Ebden	Ellen Perez	Lleyton Hewitt	(Australia)
13	Brazil	Comb #5	Thiago Monteiro	109	Beatriz Haddad Maia	17	Gustavo Heide	Carolina Alves	Rafael Matos	Luisa Stefani	Rafael Paciaroni	(Brazil)
14	Spain	Comb #4	Pablo Carreño Busta	18^{PR(196)}	Jéssica Bouzas Maneiro	54	Carlos Taberner	Marina Bassols Ribera	Sergio Martos Gornés	Yvonne Cavallé Reimers	José Antonio Sánchez de Luna	(Spain)
15	Norway	ATP #2	Casper Ruud	6	Malene Helgø	404	Viktor Durasovic	Ulrikke Eikeri	—	—	Christian Ruud	(Norway)
16	Switzerland	Comb #6	Dominic Stricker	94^{PR(300)}	Belinda Bencic	15^{PR(487)}	Rémy Bertola	Céline Naef	Jakub Paul	Conny Perrin	Sandra Naef	(Switzerland)
17	Argentina	Comb #7	Tomás Martín Etcheverry	39	Nadia Podoroska	100	Thiago Agustín Tirante	María Lourdes Carlé	Guido Andreozzi	—	Horacio de la Peña	(Argentina)
18	Croatia	Comb #8	Borna Ćorić	90	Donna Vekić	19	Luka Mikrut	Lucija Ćirić Bagarić	Ivan Dodig	Petra Marčinko	Iva Majoli	(Croatia)

=== Withdrawals ===
Seed	Nation	Ass.	Player	Rank	Reason
5	China	WTA	Zheng Qinwen	5	Recovery
6	Great Britain	ATP	Jack Draper	15	Hip injury
10	France	WTA	Diane Parry	63	Injury

- Singles rankings are as of 23 December 2024
- PR = Protected ranking

== Group stage ==
Qualified for the knockout stage (**in bold**)
Eliminated (in italics)

=== Overview ===
G = Group, T = Ties, M = Matches, S = Sets

G	Winner				Runner-up				Third			
G	Country	T	M	S	Country	T	M	S	Country	T	M	S
A	United States	2–0	5–1	11–2	Canada	1–1	3–3	7–7	Croatia	0–2	1–5	2–11
B	Poland	2–0	4–2	9–5	**Czech Republic**	1–1	3–3	7–7	Norway	0–2	2–4	5–9
C	Kazakhstan	2–0	5–1	10–4	Greece	1–1	2–4	5–10	Spain	0–2	2–4	7–8
D	Italy	2–0	6–0	12–1	Switzerland	1–1	2–4	4–8	France	0–2	1–5	3–10
E	Germany	2–0	5–1	11–4	**China**	1–1	4–2	9–6	Brazil	0–2	0–6	2–12
F	Great Britain	1–1	3–3	7–6	Australia	1–1	3–3	6–6	Argentina	1–1	3–3	6–7

=== Group A ===
Host city: Perth

Pos.	Country	Ties W–L	Matches W–L	Sets W–L	Games W–L
1	**United States**	2–0	5–1	11–2 (85%)	76–49 (61%)
2	Canada	1–1	3–3	7–7 (50%)	71–66 (52%)
3	Croatia	0–2	1–5	2–11 (15%)	42–74 (36%)

==== Canada vs. Croatia ====
Canada
2
Perth
28 December 2024

Croatia
1

			1	2	3
1	(Canada) (Croatia)	**Leylah Fernandez**; Donna Vekić	**6**; 4	**6**; 3
2	(Canada) (Croatia)	Félix Auger-Aliassime; **Borna Ćorić**	**6**; 0	4; **6**	4; **6**
3	(Canada) (Croatia)	**Leylah Fernandez / Félix Auger-Aliassime**; Lucija Ćirić Bagarić / Ivan Dodig	**6**; 3	**6**; 4

==== United States vs. Canada ====
United States
2
Perth
29 December 2024

Canada
1

			1	2	3
1	(United States) (Canada)	**Coco Gauff**; Leylah Fernandez	**6**; 3	**6**; 2
2	(United States) (Canada)	Taylor Fritz; **Félix Auger-Aliassime**	**6**; 4	5; **7**	3; **6**
3	(United States) (Canada)	**Coco Gauff / Taylor Fritz**; Leylah Fernandez / Félix Auger-Aliassime	**7^{7}** 6^{2}	**7**; 5

==== United States vs. Croatia ====
United States
3
Perth
31 December 2024

Croatia
0

			1	2	3
1	(United States) (Croatia)	**Taylor Fritz**; Borna Ćorić	**6**; 3	**6**; 2
2	(United States) (Croatia)	**Coco Gauff**; Donna Vekić	**6**; 4	**6**; 2
3	(United States) (Croatia)	**Coco Gauff / Taylor Fritz**; Petra Marčinko / Ivan Dodig	**6**; 2	**6**; 3

=== Group B ===
Host city: Sydney

Pos.	Country	Ties W–L	Matches W–L	Sets W–L	Games W–L
1	**Poland**	2–0	4–2	9–5 (64%)	67–55 (55%)
2	**Czech Republic**	1–1	3–3	7–7 (50%)	73–70 (51%)
3	Norway	0–2	2–4	5–9 (36%)	53–68 (44%)

==== Czech Republic vs. Norway ====
Czech Republic
2
Sydney
29 December 2024

Norway
1

			1	2	3
1	(Czech Republic) (Norway)	**Karolína Muchová**; Malene Helgø	**6**; 2	**6**; 2
2	(Czech Republic) (Norway)	Tomáš Macháč; **Casper Ruud**	6^{6} **7^{8}**	**7**; 5	4; **6**
3	(Czech Republic) (Norway)	**Karolína Muchová / Tomáš Macháč**; Ulrikke Eikeri / Viktor Durasovic	**6**; 4	**6**; 4

==== Poland vs. Norway ====
Poland
2
Sydney
30 December 2024

Norway
1

			1	2	3
1	(Poland) (Norway)	**Iga Świątek**; Malene Helgø	**6**; 1	**6**; 0
2	(Poland) (Norway)	Hubert Hurkacz; **Casper Ruud**	5; **7**	3; **6**
3	(Poland) (Norway)	**Iga Świątek / Jan Zieliński**; Ulrikke Eikeri / Casper Ruud	**6**; 3	0; **6**	**10**; 8

==== Poland vs. Czech Republic ====
Poland
2
Sydney
1 January 2025

Czech Republic
1

			1	2	3
1	(Poland) (Czech Republic)	Hubert Hurkacz; **Tomáš Macháč**	5; **7**	**6**; 3	4; **6**
2	(Poland) (Czech Republic)	**Iga Świątek**; Karolína Muchová	**6**; 3	**6**; 4
3	(Poland) (Czech Republic)	**Iga Świątek / Hubert Hurkacz**; Karolína Muchová / Tomáš Macháč	**7^{7}** 6^{3}	**6**; 3

=== Group C ===
Host city: Perth

Pos.	Country	Ties W–L	Matches W–L	Sets W–L	Games W–L
1	**Kazakhstan**	2–0	5–1	10–4 (71%)	63–56 (53%)
2	Greece	1–1	2–4	5–10 (33%)	56–68 (45%)
3	Spain	0–2	2–4	7–8 (47%)	64–59 (52%)

==== Kazakhstan vs. Spain ====
Kazakhstan
2
Perth
27 December 2024

Spain
1

			1	2	3
1	(Kazakhstan) (Spain)	Alexander Shevchenko; **Pablo Carreño Busta**	2; **6**	1; **6**
2	(Kazakhstan) (Spain)	**Elena Rybakina**; Jéssica Bouzas Maneiro	**6**; 2	**6**; 3
3	(Kazakhstan) (Spain)	**Elena Rybakina / Alexander Shevchenko**; Yvonne Cavallé Reimers / Pablo Carreño Busta	**7^{7}** 6^{4}	6^{2} **7^{7}**	**10**; 7

==== Greece vs. Spain ====
Greece
2
Perth
28 December 2024

Spain
1

			1	2	3
1	(Greece) (Spain)	Maria Sakkari; **Jéssica Bouzas Maneiro**	2; **6**	1; **6**
2	(Greece) (Spain)	**Stefanos Tsitsipas**; Pablo Carreño Busta	**6**; 4	4; **6**	**6**; 3
3	(Greece) (Spain)	**Maria Sakkari / Stefanos Tsitsipas**; Yvonne Cavallé Reimers / Sergio Martos Gornés	4; **6**	**6**; 3	**10**; 6

==== Greece vs. Kazakhstan ====
Greece
0
Perth
30 December 2024

Kazakhstan
3

			1	2	3
1	(Greece) (Kazakhstan)	Stefanos Tsitsipas; **Alexander Shevchenko**	4; **6**	6^{0} **7^{7}**
2	(Greece) (Kazakhstan)	Maria Sakkari; **Elena Rybakina**	4; **6**	3; **6**
3	(Greece) (Kazakhstan)	Despina Papamichail / Petros Tsitsipas; **Zhibek Kulambayeva / Aleksandr Nedovyesov**	**6**; 2	3; **6**	6; **10**

=== Group D ===
Host city: Sydney

Pos.	Country	Ties W–L	Matches W–L	Sets W–L	Games W–L
1	**Italy**	2–0	6–0	12–1 (92%)	78–44 (64%)
2	Switzerland	1–1	2–4	4–8 (33%)	52–61 (46%)
3	France	0–2	1–5	3–10 (23%)	49–74 (40%)

==== France vs. Switzerland ====
France
1
Sydney
28 December 2024

Switzerland
2

			1	2	3
1	(France) (Switzerland)	Chloé Paquet; **Belinda Bencic**	3; **6**	1; **6**
2	(France) (Switzerland)	**Ugo Humbert**; Dominic Stricker	**6**; 3	**7**; 5
3	(France) (Switzerland)	Elixane Lechemia / Édouard Roger-Vasselin; **Belinda Bencic / Dominic Stricker**	1; **6**	6^{4} 7^{7}

==== Italy vs. Switzerland ====
Italy
3
Sydney
29 December 2024

Switzerland
0

			1	2	3
1	(Italy) (Switzerland)	**Flavio Cobolli**; Dominic Stricker	**6**; 3	**7^{7}** 6^{2}
2	(Italy) (Switzerland)	**Jasmine Paolini**; Belinda Bencic	**6**; 1	**6**; 1
3	(Italy) (Switzerland)	**Sara Errani / Andrea Vavassori**; Belinda Bencic / Dominic Stricker	**6**; 4	**6**; 4

==== Italy vs. France ====
Italy
3
Sydney
31 December 2024

France
0

			1	2	3
1	(Italy) (France)	**Flavio Cobolli**; Ugo Humbert	3; **6**	**7^{10}** 6^{8}	**6**; 2
2	(Italy) (France)	**Jasmine Paolini**; Chloé Paquet	**6**; 0	**6**; 2
3	(Italy) (France)	**Sara Errani / Andrea Vavassori**; Elixane Lechemia / Édouard Roger-Vasselin	**6**; 3	**7^{7}** 6^{3}

=== Group E ===
Host city: Perth

Pos.	Country	Ties W–L	Matches W–L	Sets W–L	Games W–L
1	**Germany**	2–0	5–1	11–4 (73%)	75–62 (55%)
2	**China**	1–1	4–2	9–6 (60%)	74–65 (53%)
3	Brazil	0–2	0–6	2–12 (14%)	59–81 (42%)

==== China vs. Brazil ====
China
3
Perth
27 December 2024

Brazil
0

			1	2	3
1	(China) (Brazil)	**Gao Xinyu**; Beatriz Haddad Maia	5; **7**	**6**; 4	**7**; 5
2	(China) (Brazil)	**Zhang Zhizhen**; Thiago Monteiro	**6**; 3	**6**; 0
3	(China) (Brazil)	**Zhang Shuai / Zhang Zhizhen**; Carolina Alves / Rafael Matos	**6**; 4	**7**; 5

==== Germany vs. Brazil ====
Germany
3
Perth
29 December 2024

Brazil
0

			1	2	3
1	(Germany) (Brazil)	**Laura Siegemund**; Beatriz Haddad Maia	**6**; 3	1; **6**	**6**; 4
2	(Germany) (Brazil)	**Alexander Zverev**; Thiago Monteiro	**6**; 4	**6**; 4
3	(Germany) (Brazil)	**Laura Siegemund / Tim Pütz**; Carolina Alves / Rafael Matos	**7^{10}** 6^{8}	**6**; 4

==== China vs. Germany ====
China
1
Perth
30 December 2024

Germany
2

			1	2	3
1	(China) (Germany)	Zhang Zhizhen; **Alexander Zverev**	**6**; 2	0; **6**	2; **6**
2	(China) (Germany)	**Gao Xinyu**; Laura Siegemund	**6**; 1	3; **6**	**6**; 3
3	(China) (Germany)	Zhang Shuai / Zhang Zhizhen; **Laura Siegemund / Alexander Zverev**	2; **6**	6^{3} **7^{7}**

=== Group F ===
Host city: Sydney

Pos.	Country	Ties W–L	Matches W–L	Sets W–L	Games W–L
1	**Great Britain**	1–1	3–3	7–6 (54%)	61–59 (51%)
2	Australia	1–1	3–3	6–6 (50%)	52–53 (50%)
3	Argentina	1–1	3–3	6–7 (46%)	60–61 (50%)

==== Australia vs. Argentina ====
Australia
1
Sydney
28 December 2024

Argentina
2

			1	2	3
1	(Australia) (Argentina)	Olivia Gadecki; **Nadia Podoroska**	2; **6**	4; **6**
2	(Australia) (Argentina)	**Alex de Minaur**; Tomás Martín Etcheverry	**6**; 1	**6**; 4
3	(Australia) (Argentina)	Ellen Perez / Matthew Ebden; **María Lourdes Carlé / Tomás Martín Etcheverry**	2; **6**	4; **6**

==== Great Britain vs. Argentina ====
Great Britain
2
Sydney
30 December 2024

Argentina
1

			1	2	3
1	(United Kingdom) (Argentina)	**Katie Boulter**; Nadia Podoroska	**6**; 2	**6**; 3
2	(United Kingdom) (Argentina)	Billy Harris; **Tomás Martín Etcheverry**	**6**; 3	3; **6**	2; **6**
3	(United Kingdom) (Argentina)	**Katie Boulter / Charles Broom**; María Lourdes Carlé / Tomás Martín Etcheverry	**7^{7}** 6^{4}	**7**; 5

==== Great Britain vs. Australia ====
Great Britain
1
Sydney
1 January 2025

Australia
2

			1	2	3
1	(United Kingdom) (Australia)	**Katie Boulter**; Olivia Gadecki	**6**; 2	**6**; 1
2	(United Kingdom) (Australia)	Billy Harris; **Alex de Minaur**	2; **6**	1; **6**
3	(United Kingdom) (Australia)	Olivia Nicholls / Charles Broom; **Olivia Gadecki / Alex De Minaur**	3; **6**	6^{3} **7^{7}**

=== Ranking of second-placed teams ===
The best runner-up quarter-final spot is determined by the number of ties won and the number of ties played. In a tie between three teams, the team having played fewer total matches (singles and mixed doubles) will be eliminated and, if still tied then the team with the most match wins (singles and doubles). If still tied, then the ranking is determined by, in order: 1) the highest percentage of matches won, 2) the highest percentage of sets won, and 3) the highest percentage of games won.

Host city: Perth

Pos.	Country	Ties W–L	Matches W–L	Sets W–L	Games W–L
1	**China**	1–1	4–2	9–6 (60%)	74–65 (53%)
2	Canada	1–1	3–3	7–7 (50%)	71–66 (52%)
3	Greece	1–1	2–4	5–10 (33%)	56–68 (45%)

Host city: Sydney

Pos.	Country	Ties W–L	Matches W–L	Sets W–L	Games W–L
1	**Czech Republic**	1–1	3–3	7–7 (50%)	73–70 (51%)
2	Australia	1–1	3–3	6–6 (50%)	52–53 (50%)
3	Switzerland	1–1	2–4	4–8 (33%)	52–61 (46%)

== Knockout stage ==
=== Bracket ===
Quarterfinals
1 January – Perth
Kazakhstan	2
Germany	1
2 January – Sydney
Poland	3
Great Britain	0
1 January – Perth
United States	3
China	0
3 January – Sydney
Italy	1
Czech Republic	2

Semifinals
4 January – Sydney
Kazakhstan	0
Poland	3
4 January – Sydney
United States	3
Czech Republic	0

Final
5 January – Sydney
Poland	0
United States	2

=== Quarterfinals ===
==== Kazakhstan vs. Germany ====
Kazakhstan
2
Perth, RAC Arena
1 January 2025

Germany
1

			1	2	3
1	(Kazakhstan) (Germany)	Elena Rybakina; Laura Siegemund	6; 3	6; 1
2	(Kazakhstan) (Germany)	Alexander Shevchenko; Daniel Masur	6^{5} 7^{7}	6; 2	6; 2
3	(Kazakhstan) (Germany)	Zhibek Kulambayeva / Dmitry Popko; Laura Siegemund / Tim Pütz	2; 6	2; 6

==== Poland vs. Great Britain ====
Poland
3
Sydney, Ken Rosewall Arena
2 January 2025

Great Britain
0

			1	2	3
1	(Poland) (United Kingdom)	Hubert Hurkacz; Billy Harris	7^{7} 6^{3}	7; 5
2	(Poland) (United Kingdom)	Iga Świątek; Katie Boulter	6^{4} 7^{7}	6; 1	6; 4
3	(Poland) (United Kingdom)	Maja Chwalińska / Jan Zieliński; Olivia Nicholls / Charles Broom	6; 2	7^{7} 6^{3}

==== United States vs. China ====
United States
3
Perth, RAC Arena
1 January 2025

China
0

			1	2	3
1	(United States) (China)	Coco Gauff; Zhang Shuai	7^{7} 6^{4}	6; 2
2	(United States) (China)	Taylor Fritz; Zhang Zhizhen	6; 4	6; 4
3	(United States) (China)	Desirae Krawczyk / Robert Galloway; Zhang Shuai / Sun Fajing	6; 3	6^{1} 7^{7}	10; 3

==== Italy vs. Czech Republic ====
Italy
1
Sydney, Ken Rosewall Arena
3 January 2025

Czech Republic
2

			1	2	3
1	(Italy) (Czech Republic)	Jasmine Paolini; Karolína Muchová	2; 6	2; 6
2	(Italy) (Czech Republic)	Flavio Cobolli; Tomáš Macháč	1; 6	2; 6
3	(Italy) (Czech Republic)	Sara Errani / Andrea Vavassori; Gabriela Knutson / Patrik Rikl	7; 5	3; 6	10; 4

=== Semifinals ===
==== Kazakhstan vs. Poland ====
Kazakhstan
0
Sydney, Ken Rosewall Arena
4 January 2025

Poland
3

			1	2	3
1	(Kazakhstan) (Poland)	Alexander Shevchenko; Hubert Hurkacz	3; 6	2; 6
2	(Kazakhstan) (Poland)	Elena Rybakina; Iga Świątek	6^{5} 7^{7}	4; 6
3	(Kazakhstan) (Poland)	Zhibek Kulambayeva / Alexander Shevchenko; Maja Chwalińska / Jan Zieliński	4; 6	1; 6

==== United States vs. Czech Republic ====
United States
3
Sydney, Ken Rosewall Arena
4 January 2025

Czech Republic
0

			1	2	3
1	(United States) (Czech Republic)	Coco Gauff; Karolína Muchová	6; 1	6; 4
2	(United States) (Czech Republic)	Taylor Fritz; Tomáš Macháč	6^{4} 7^{7}	6; 5		retired
3	(United States) (Czech Republic)	Desirae Krawczyk / Denis Kudla; Gabriela Knutson / Patrik Rikl	7; 5	6; 0

=== Final ===
==== Poland vs. United States ====
Poland
0
Sydney, Ken Rosewall Arena
5 January 2025

United States
2

			1	2	3
1	(Poland) (United States)	Iga Świątek; Coco Gauff	4; 6	4; 6
2	(Poland) (United States)	Hubert Hurkacz; Taylor Fritz	4; 6	7; 5	6^{4} 7^{7}
3	(Poland) (United States)	Iga Świątek / Hubert Hurkacz; Coco Gauff / Taylor Fritz				not played
