= 2018 Fed Cup Europe/Africa Zone Group III – Pool B (Ulcinj) =

Subsection of tennis competition

Pool B (Ulcinj) of the 2018 Fed Cup Europe/Africa Group III was one of four pools in the Europe/Africa Group III of the 2018 Fed Cup. Four teams competed in a round robin competition, with the top and bottom teams proceeding to their respective section of the play-offs: the top team played for advancement to Group II.

== Standings ==
		MLT	MAR	IRL	UGA	RR; W–L	Set; W–L	Game; W–L	Standings
13	Malta		3–0	3–0	3–0	3–0	18–0 (100%)	109–20 (84%)	1
5	Morocco	0–3		2–1	3–0	2–1	10–9 (53%)	79–68 (54%)	2
7	Ireland	0–3	1–2		3–0	1–2	9–10 (47%)	76–71 (52%)	3
17	Uganda	0–3	0–3	0–3		0–3	0–18 (0%)	3–108 (3%)	4

Standings are determined by: 1. number of wins; 2. if two teams have the same number of wins, head-to-head record; 3. if three teams have the same number of wins, (a) number of matches won in the group, then (b) percentage of sets won in the group, then (c) percentage of games won in the group, then (d) Fed Cup rankings.

== Round-robin ==
=== Morocco vs. Uganda ===
Morocco
3
Ulcinj Bellevue, Ulcinj, Montenegro
16 April
Clay

Uganda
0

			1	2	3
1	(Morocco) (Uganda)	Rita Atik; N/A				w/o
2	(Morocco) (Uganda)	Diae El Jardi; N/A				w/o
3	(Morocco) (Uganda)	Oumaima Aziz / Diae El Jardi; N/A / N/A				w/o

=== Ireland vs. Malta ===
Ireland
0
Ulcinj Bellevue, Ulcinj, Montenegro
16 April
Clay

Malta
3

			1	2	3
1	(Republic of Ireland) (Malta)	Jane Fennelly; Francesca Curmi	1; 6	2; 6
2	(Republic of Ireland) (Malta)	Amy Bowtell; Elaine Genovese	1; 6	2; 6
3	(Republic of Ireland) (Malta)	Ruth Copas / Lauren Deegan; Francesca Curmi / Elaine Genovese	3; 6	0; 6

=== Morocco vs. Ireland ===
Morocco
2
Ulcinj Bellevue, Ulcinj, Montenegro
17 April
Clay

Ireland
1

			1	2	3
1	(Morocco) (Republic of Ireland)	Oumaima Aziz; Jane Fennelly	6; 3	6; 3
2	(Morocco) (Republic of Ireland)	Diae El Jardi; Amy Bowtell	5; 7	0; 6
3	(Morocco) (Republic of Ireland)	Oumaima Aziz / Diae El Jardi; Ruth Copas / Jane Fennelly	6; 2	3; 6	6; 4

=== Malta vs. Uganda ===
Malta
3
Ulcinj Bellevue, Ulcinj, Montenegro
17 April
Clay

Uganda
0

			1	2	3
1	(Malta) (Uganda)	Francesca Curmi; N/A				w/o
2	(Malta) (Uganda)	Elaine Genovese; N/A				w/o
3	(Malta) (Uganda)	Francesca Curmi / Elaine Genovese; N/A / N/A				w/o

=== Morocco vs. Malta ===
Morocco
0
Ulcinj Bellevue, Ulcinj, Montenegro
18 April
Clay

Malta
3

			1	2	3
1	(Morocco) (Malta)	Oumaima Aziz; Francesca Curmi	2; 6	1; 4		retired
2	(Morocco) (Malta)	Rita Atik; Elaine Genovese	0; 6	0; 6
3	(Morocco) (Malta)	Rita Atik / Diae El Jardi; Francesca Curmi / Elaine Genovese	6^{4} 7^{7}	2; 6

=== Ireland vs. Uganda ===
Ireland
3
Ulcinj Bellevue, Ulcinj, Montenegro
18 April
Clay

Uganda
0

			1	2	3
1	(Republic of Ireland) (Uganda)	Jane Fennelly; Daphine Namulinde Mukasa	6; 0	6; 0
2	(Republic of Ireland) (Uganda)	Ruth Copas; Winnie Birungi	6; 0	6; 0
3	(Republic of Ireland) (Uganda)	Lauren Deegan / Jane Fennelly; Patience Athieno / Sandra Khissa	6; 2	6; 1

== See also ==
- Fed Cup structure
