= 2018 Fed Cup Europe/Africa Zone Group III – Pool A (Tunis) =

Subsection of tennis competition

Pool A (Tunis) of the 2018 Fed Cup Europe/Africa Group III was one of four pools in the Europe/Africa Group III of the 2018 Fed Cup. Four teams competed in a round robin competition, with the top team and bottom teams proceeding to their respective section of the play-offs: the top team played for advancement to Group II.

== Standings ==
		LTU	ARM	MKD	ISL	RR; W–L	Set; W–L	Game; W–L	Standings
1	Lithuania		3–0	3–0	3–0	3–0	18–0 (100%)	110–26 (81%)	1
11	Armenia	0–3		3–0	3–0	2–1	12–8 (60%)	83–77 (52%)	2
4	Macedonia	0–3	0–3		2–1	1–2	5–14 (26%)	69–99 (41%)	3
16	Iceland	0–3	0–3	1–2		0–3	3–16 (16%)	51–111 (31%)	4

Standings are determined by: 1. number of wins; 2. if two teams have the same number of wins, head-to-head record; 3. if three teams have the same number of wins, (a) number of matches won in the group, then (b) percentage of sets won in the group, then (c) percentage of games won in the group, then (d) Fed Cup rankings.

== Round robin ==
=== Lithuania vs. Iceland ===
Lithuania
3
Cité Nationale Sportive, Tunis, Tunisia
17 April
Hard

Iceland
0

			1	2	3
1	(Lithuania) (Iceland)	Paulina Bakaitė; Sofia Sóley Jónasdóttir	6; 2	6; 0
2	(Lithuania) (Iceland)	Joana Eidukonytė; Anna Soffía Grönholm	6; 1	6; 0
3	(Lithuania) (Iceland)	Joana Eidukonytė / Gerda Zykutė; Anna Soffía Grönholm / Sofia Sóley Jónasdóttir	6; 2	6; 1

=== Macedonia vs. Armenia ===
North Macedonia
0
Cité Nationale Sportive, Tunis, Tunisia
17 April
Hard

Armenia
3

			1	2	3
1	(North Macedonia) (Armenia)	Marija Elenova; Anna Movsisyan	6; 3	2; 6	1; 6
2	(North Macedonia) (Armenia)	Katarina Marinkovikj; Ani Amiraghyan	1; 6	3; 6
3	(North Macedonia) (Armenia)	Marija Elenova / Katarina Marinkovikj; Marina Davtyan / Anna Movsisyan	4; 6	1; 6

=== Lithuania vs. Armenia ===
Lithuania
3
Cité Nationale Sportive, Tunis, Tunisia
19 April
Hard

Armenia
0

			1	2	3
1	(Lithuania) (Armenia)	Paulina Bakaitė; Marina Davtyan	6; 2	6; 1
2	(Lithuania) (Armenia)	Joana Eidukonytė; Ani Amiraghyan	4; 0			retired
3	(Lithuania) (Armenia)	Joana Eidukonytė / Gerda Zykutė; Ani Amiraghyan / Marina Davtyan				w/o

=== Macedonia vs. Iceland ===
North Macedonia
2
Cité Nationale Sportive, Tunis, Tunisia
19 April
Hard

Iceland
1

			1	2	3
1	(North Macedonia) (Iceland)	Marija Elenova; Sofia Sóley Jónasdóttir	6; 2	6; 1
2	(North Macedonia) (Iceland)	Katarina Marinkovikj; Anna Soffía Grönholm	6; 4	6; 2
3	(North Macedonia) (Iceland)	Marija Elenova / Katarina Marinkovikj; Anna Soffía Grönholm / Sofia Sóley Jónasdóttir	6^{5} 7^{7}	4; 6

=== Lithuania vs. Macedonia ===
Lithuania
3
Cité Nationale Sportive, Tunis, Tunisia
20 April
Hard

North Macedonia
0

			1	2	3
1	(Lithuania) (North Macedonia)	Paulina Bakaitė; Marija Elenova	7; 5	7^{7} 6^{0}
2	(Lithuania) (North Macedonia)	Joana Eidukonytė; Katarina Marinkovikj	6; 0	6; 1
3	(Lithuania) (North Macedonia)	Iveta Daujotaitė / Gerda Zykutė; Ana Ristevska / Jana Tanevska	6; 2	6; 3

=== Armenia vs. Iceland ===
Armenia
3
Cité Nationale Sportive, Tunis, Tunisia
20 April
Hard

Iceland
0

			1	2	3
1	(Armenia) (Iceland)	Anna Movsisyan; Sofia Sóley Jónasdóttir	7; 5	4; 6	6; 4
2	(Armenia) (Iceland)	Ani Amiraghyan; Anna Soffía Grönholm	6; 0	6; 3
3	(Armenia) (Iceland)	Ani Amiraghyan / Marina Davtyan; Anna Soffía Grönholm / Iris Staub	6; 2	6; 3

== See also ==
- Fed Cup structure
