= Tennis Federation of Kosovo =

- Sport: Tennis
- Jurisdiction: Kosovo
- Founded: 1996
- Affiliation: International Tennis Federation
- Regional affiliation: Tennis Europe
- Affiliation date: 2015

Official website
- tenniskosova.com
- (Kosovo)

The Tennis Federation of Kosovo (Albanian: Federata e Tenisit e Kosovës; Serbian: Тениски савез Косова / Teniski savez Kosova) is a governing body of tennis in Kosovo.

== History ==
Tennis Federation of Kosovo was established in 1996 in Peja. Kosovo became the 50th member of Tennis Europe on 28 March 2015.

== Tennis clubs in Kosovo ==
The Tennis Federation of Kosovo currently oversees eleven tennis clubs. There are some clubs like K.T. Prishtina (Prishtine), K.T. Rilindja (Prishtine), K.T. Sporek ([Gjakove]), K.T.DielliX (Prishtine), K.T. Prizreni, K.T. Trepça (Mitrovice), K.T. Drenica (Skenderaj), K.T. Rahoveci (Rahovec), K.T. 99 (Gjilan), K.T. Peja, K.T. Gracanica
