= 2018 Fed Cup Europe/Africa Zone Group III – Pool A (Ulcinj) =

Subsection of tennis competition

Pool A (Ulcinj) of the 2018 Fed Cup Europe/Africa Group III was one of four pools in the Europe/Africa Group III of the 2018 Fed Cup. Four teams competed in a round robin competition, with the top team and bottom teams proceeding to their respective section of the play-offs: the top team played for advancement to Group II.

== Standings ==
		RSA	FIN	MNE	KEN	RR; W–L	Set; W–L	Game; W–L	Standings
6	South Africa		2–1	2–1	3–0	3–0	15–6 (71%)	113–68 (62%)	1
3	Finland	1–2		2–1	3–0	2–1	13–8 (62%)	106–77 (58%)	2
9	Montenegro	1–2	1–2		2–1	1–2	10–11 (48%)	87–101 (46%)	3
14	Kenya	0–3	0–3	1–2		0–3	3–16 (16%)	44–104 (30%)	4

Standings are determined by: 1. number of wins; 2. if two teams have the same number of wins, head-to-head record; 3. if three teams have the same number of wins, (a) number of matches won in the group, then (b) percentage of sets won in the group, then (c) percentage of games won in the group, then (d) Fed Cup rankings.

== Round-robin ==
=== Finland vs. Kenya ===
Finland
3
Ulcinj Bellevue, Ulcinj, Montenegro
16 April
Clay

Kenya
0

			1	2	3
1	(Finland) (Kenya)	Piia Suomalainen; Judith Muraa	6; 2	6; 1
2	(Finland) (Kenya)	Mia Eklund; Angella Okutoyi	6; 0	6; 2
3	(Finland) (Kenya)	Mia Eklund / Ella Haavisto; Angella Okutoyi / Faith Nyabera Omurunga	6; 2	6; 1

=== South Africa vs. Montenegro ===
South Africa
2
Ulcinj Bellevue, Ulcinj, Montenegro
16 April
Clay

Montenegro
1

			1	2	3
1	(South Africa) (Montenegro)	Katie Poluta; Anja Drašković	6; 2	4; 6	6; 2
2	(South Africa) (Montenegro)	Chanel Simmonds; Danka Kovinić	4; 6	5; 7
3	(South Africa) (Montenegro)	Madrie Le Roux / Chanel Simmonds; Anja Drašković / Danka Kovinić	6; 2	6; 1

=== Finland vs. Montenegro ===
Finland
2
Ulcinj Bellevue, Ulcinj, Montenegro
17 April
Clay

Montenegro
1

			1	2	3
1	(Finland) (Montenegro)	Piia Suomalainen; Divna Ratković	6; 1	6; 1
2	(Finland) (Montenegro)	Mia Eklund; Danka Kovinić	2; 6	2; 6
3	(Finland) (Montenegro)	Mia Eklund / Emma Laine; Anja Drašković / Danka Kovinić	6^{9} 7^{11}	6; 3	7; 5

=== South Africa vs. Kenya ===
South Africa
3
Ulcinj Bellevue, Ulcinj, Montenegro
17 April
Clay

Kenya
0

			1	2	3
1	(South Africa) (Kenya)	Katie Poluta; Judith Muraa	6; 1	6; 0
2	(South Africa) (Kenya)	Chanel Simmonds; Angella Okutoyi	6; 2	6; 2
3	(South Africa) (Kenya)	Madrie Le Roux / Minette van Vreden; Judith Muraa / Faith Nyabera Omurunga	6; 1	6; 1

=== Finland vs. South Africa ===
Finland
1
Ulcinj Bellevue, Ulcinj, Montenegro
18 April
Clay

South Africa
2

			1	2	3
1	(Finland) (South Africa)	Piia Suomalainen; Katie Poluta	6^{4} 7^{7}	6; 0	6; 3
2	(Finland) (South Africa)	Mia Eklund; Chanel Simmonds	0; 6	7; 5	1; 6
3	(Finland) (South Africa)	Mia Eklund / Emma Laine; Madrie Le Roux / Chanel Simmonds	3; 6	6^{4} 7^{7}

=== Montenegro vs. Kenya ===
Montenegro
2
Ulcinj Bellevue, Ulcinj, Montenegro
18 April
Clay

Kenya
1

			1	2	3
1	(Montenegro) (Kenya)	Divna Ratković; Judith Muraa	6; 2	6; 1
2	(Montenegro) (Kenya)	Anja Drašković; Angella Okutoyi	6; 4	4; 6	6; 4
3	(Montenegro) (Kenya)	Anja Drašković / Divna Ratković; Angella Okutoyi / Faith Nyabera Omurunga	4; 6	0; 0		retired

== See also ==
- Fed Cup structure
