= Kosovo Billie Jean King Cup team =

National tennis team

Kosovo
- Captain: Arben Islami
- ITF ranking: 52
- Colors: yellow & blue
- First year: 2016
- Years played: 6
- Ties played (W–L): 28 (12–16)
- Most total wins: Arlinda Rushiti (10-5)
- Most singles wins: Arlinda Rushiti (10-5)
- Most doubles wins: Edita Raca (2–1)
- Best doubles team: Edita Raca / Arlinda Rushiti (2–1)
- Most ties played: (15) Arlinda Rushiti
- Most years played: Arlinda Rushiti (3); Donika Bashota (2) (2); Blearta Ukëhaxhaj (2) Vesa Gjinaj

The Kosovo Billie Jean King Cup team represents Kosovo in Billie Jean King Cup tennis competition and are governed by the Tennis Federation of Kosovo. They took part in the Fed Cup for the first time in 2016, competing in the Europe/Africa Zone Group III.

== History ==
On 28 March 2015, Tennis Europe granted membership to the Tennis Federation of Kosovo, which became effective in 2016. In December 2015, the Federation announced that it would compete at the 2016 Fed Cup in the Europe/Africa Zone Group III.

Kosovo would then compete two years later in the 2018 Fed Cup in the Europe/Africa Zone Group III facing in Pool B host Tunisia as well as Cyprus, Algeria and Madagascar as their opponents. Kosovo were able get one win against Madagascar through set wins from Arlinda Rushiti against Iariniaina Tsantaniony and in the Doubles with Blearta Ukëhaxhaj. Kosovo finished their campaign in 8th place after losing against Iceland in the playoffs.

The best result for Kosovo came at the 2019 Fed Cup in the Europe/Africa Zone Group III in Pool B where they faced Cyprus, North Macedonia as well as Algeria and Congo. Kosovo won three matches in this group and only lost one match against Cyprus. Donika Bashota winning all four single matches in her campaign. Arlinda Rushiti winning three single matches. They impressively beat North Macedonia and Algeria both with 2-1 set wins. They finished second in the standings. In the Play-offs they faced Lithuania losing against them after two single matches, securing in the end a fourth-place finish.

== Players ==
Name	Years	First	Ties	Win/Loss		
Name	Years	First	Ties	Singles	Doubles	Total
Donika Bashota	2	2019	8	5–3	0–2	5–5
Aja Broqi	1	2021	2	–	0–2	0–2
Vesa Gjinaj	2	2019	5	–	0–5	0–5
Anduena Latifi	1	2016	1	0–0	0–1	0–1
Adrijana Lekaj	1	2021	3	1–2	0–1	1–3
Liridona Murati	1	2018	4	0–3	0–2	0–5
Fiona Polloshka	1	2016	1	0–0	0–1	0–1
Edita Raca	1	2016	5	1–4	2–1	3–5
Arlinda Rushiti	3	2016	15	10–5	3–8	13–13
Blearta Ukëhaxhaj	2	2018	7	0–2	1–5	1–7

== Matches ==
Year	Competition	Date	Surface	Location	Opponent	Score	Result
2016	Europe/Africa Zone Group III Pool D	11 April	clay	Ulcinj, Montenegro	Montenegro	0 : 3	Lost
2016	Europe/Africa Zone Group III Pool D	13 April	clay	Ulcinj, Montenegro	Norway	0 : 3	Lost
2016	Europe/Africa Zone Group III Pool D	14 April	clay	Ulcinj, Montenegro	Morocco	1 : 2	Lost
2016	Europe/Africa Zone Group III Pool D	15 April	clay	Ulcinj, Montenegro	Mozambique	3 : 0	Won
2016	Europe/Africa Zone Group III Play-offs	16 April	clay	Ulcinj, Montenegro	Iceland	2 : 1	Won

Year	Competition	Date	Surface	Location	Opponent	Score	Result
2018	Europe/Africa Zone Group III Pool B	16 April	hard	Tunis, Tunesia	Madagascar	1 : 2	Won
Europe/Africa Zone Group III Pool B	17 April	hard	Tunis, Tunesia	Tunisia	3 : 0	Lost	
Europe/Africa Zone Group III Pool B	18 April	hard	Tunis, Tunesia	Cyprus	2 : 1	Lost	
Europe/Africa Zone Group III Pool B	19 April	hard	Tunis, Tunesia	Algeria	2 : 1	Lost	

Year	Competition	Date	Surface	Location	Opponent	Score	Result
2019	Europe/Africa Zone Group III	15 April	Hard (indoor)	Helsinki, Finland	Cyprus	2 : 1	Lost
2019	Europe/Africa Zone Group III Pool B	16 April	Hard (indoor)	Helsinki, Finland	North Macedonia	1 : 2	Won
2019	Europe/Africa Zone Group III Pool B	17 April	Hard (indoor)	Helsinki, Finland	Algeria	1 : 2	Won
2019	Europe/Africa Zone Group III Pool B	18 April	Hard (indoor)	Helsinki, Finland	Congo	1 : 2	Won
2019	Europe/Africa Zone Group III Play-offs	20 April	Hard (indoor)	Helsinki, Finland	Lithuania	2 : 0	Loss

Year	Competition	Date	Surface	Venue	Opponent	Score	Result
2021	Europe/Africa Zone Group III, Pool C	16 June	Hard (i)	SEB Arena, Vilnius (LTU)	Nigeria	0:3	Loss
2021	Europe/Africa Zone Group III, Pool C	17 June	Hard (i)	SEB Arena, Vilnius (LTU)	Lithuania	3-0	Loss
2021	Europe/Africa Zone Group III, 13th place play-off	19 June	Hard (i)	SEB Arena, Vilnius (LTU)	Zimbabwe	2-1	Win

== See also ==
- Billie Jean King Cup
- Kosovo Davis Cup team
