= Donika Bashota =

Swedish–Kosovar tennis player

- Country (sports): Sweden; Kosovo (in Fed Cup)
- Residence: Lidköping, Sweden
- Born: 12 April 1995 (age 29)
- Plays: Right-handed (two-handed backhand)
- College: Washington State University (2014–16); Texas Christian University (2016–18)
- Prize money: $3,743

Singles
- Career record: 12–15
- Career titles: 0
- Highest ranking: 1059 (11 November 2013)

Doubles
- Career record: 20–15
- Career titles: 2 ITF
- Highest ranking: 622 (12 August 2013)

Team competitions
- Fed Cup: 4–2
- Last updated on: 7 October 2019.

Donika Bashota (born 12 April 1995) is a Swedish–Kosovar tennis player.

Bashota has a career high WTA singles ranking of 1059, achieved on 11 November 2013. She also has a career high WTA doubles ranking of 622, achieved on 12 August 2013. Bashota has won two ITF doubles titles.

Bashota represents Kosovo in the Fed Cup.

== ITF finals (2–0) ==
=== Doubles (2–0) ===
Legend $100,000 tournaments $75,000 tournaments $50,000 tournaments $25,000 tournaments $15,000 tournaments $10,000 tournaments	Finals by surface Hard (2–0) Clay (0–0) Grass (0–0) Carpet (0–0)

Outcome	No.	Date	Tournament	Surface	Partner	Opponents	Score
Winner	1.	28 October 2012	Stockholm, Sweden	Hard (i)	(Latvia) Jeļena Ostapenko	(Russia) Maria Mokh (Estonia) Eva Paalma	7–6^{(7–4)}, 6–1
Winner	2.	3 November 2013	Stockholm, Sweden	Hard (i)	(Sweden) Susanne Celik	(Sweden) Emma Ek (Slovakia) Zuzana Luknárová	6–1, 6–4
