= Arlinda Rushiti =

Swiss-Kosovar tennis player

- Country (sports): Kosovo
- Born: 27 March 1999 (age 27)
- Plays: Right (two-handed backhand)
- Prize money: $78,811

Singles
- Career record: 263–211
- Career titles: 1 ITF
- Highest ranking: No. 352 (9 January 2023)
- Current ranking: No. 1,041 (16 November 2026)

Doubles
- Career record: 67–75
- Career titles: 4 ITF
- Highest ranking: No. 444 (19 May 2025)
- Current ranking: No. 1,150 (16 November 2026)

Team competitions
- Fed Cup: 21–22

Arlinda Rushiti (born 27 March 1999) is a Kosovar inactive tennis player.

She has a career-high singles ranking by the WTA of 352, achieved on 9 January 2023. Rushiti has won five titles on the ITF Circuit, four in doubles.

Playing for Kosovo Fed Cup team, she has a win/loss record of 21–22 (as of May 2024).

== Career ==
She made her debut for the Kosovo Fed Cup team in 2018, her results including a win in the singles and doubles in a 4–0 win against Mozambique that year, her nations first match win in the competition. She was named Female Player of the Year for 2018 by the Kosovo Tennis Federation.

In January 2022, she reached her first singles final at the W25 level of the 2022 ITF Women's World Tennis Tour, competing in Monastir, Tunisia, having come through qualifying. In the final, she was defeated by Irina Khromacheva, in three sets.

In 2023, she played as Kosovo competed for the first time in Group II of the Billie Jean King Cup, and alongside Adriana Lekaj, won a deciding doubles runner against the Republic of Ireland to secure a 2–1 victory to retain their status at that level. This marked her return to the competition for Kosovo, after a four-year absence.

She won her singles and doubles match, again with Lekaj, as they defeated both Georgia and Malta in the competition in April 2024. Those results helped them retain their place in Group II, but following defeats to Estonia, Egypt and Bosnia-Herzegovina they did not gain promotion, with Rushiti losing in singles and doubles to experienced players Kaia Kanepi of Estonia and Maiar Sherif of Egypt.

== Personal life ==
As of 2022, she is based in Switzerland.

== ITF Circuit finals ==
=== Singles: 5 (1 title, 4 runner-ups) ===
| Legend W25 tournaments (0–1) W15 tournaments (1–3) | Finals by surface Hard (1–4) |

| Result | W–L | Date | Tournament | Tier | Surface | Opponent | Score |
|---|---|---|---|---|---|---|---|
| Loss | 0–1 | Oct 2017 | ITF Sharm El Sheikh, Egypt | W15 | Hard | (Chinese Taipei) Lee Pei-chi | 0–6, 3–6 |
| Loss | 0–2 | Jan 2022 | ITF Monastir, Tunisia | W25 | Hard | (Russia) Irina Khromacheva | 6–1, 4–6, 5–7 |
| Win | 1–2 | Jul 2024 | ITF Monastir, Tunisia | W15 | Hard | (Egypt) Lamis Abdel Aziz | 6–4, 2–6, 7–6^{(2)} |
| Loss | 1–3 | Oct 2024 | ITF Sharm El Sheikh | W15 | Hard | Anastasia Gasanova | 4–6, 0–6 |
| Loss | 1–4 | Nov 2024 | ITF Sharm El Sheikh | W15 | Hard | (South Korea) Lee Eun-hye | 1–6, 4–6 |

=== Doubles: 8 (4 titles, 4 runner-ups) ===
| Legend W25/35 tournaments (1–2) W15 tournaments (3–2) | Finals by surface Hard (4–4) |

| Result | W–L | Date | Tournament | Tier | Surface | Partner | Opponents | Score |
|---|---|---|---|---|---|---|---|---|
| Loss | 0–1 | May 2022 | ITF Tbilisi, Georgia | W25 | Hard | (Switzerland) Tess Sugnaux | (Bosnia and Herzegovina) Nefisa Berberović (China) Lu Jiajing | 2–6, 6–4, [7–10] |
| Loss | 0–2 | Jan 2023 | ITF Monastir, Tunisia | W25 | Hard | (Germany) Kathleen Kanev | Kristina Dmitruk; Irina Shymanovich | 1–6, 2–6 |
| Win | 1–2 | Oct 2023 | ITF Sharm El Sheikh, Egypt | W15 | Hard | (Romania) Elena-Teodora Cadar | Aleksandra Pospelova; Daria Zelinskaya | 2–6, 6–3, [11–9] |
| Loss | 1–3 | Jul 2024 | ITF Monastir, Tunisia | W15 | Hard | (Egypt) Lamis Abdel Aziz | (Japan) Nanari Katsumi (Japan) Haine Ogata | 3–6, 6–1, [6–10] |
| Win | 2–3 | Nov 2024 | ITF Sharm El Sheikh | W15 | Hard | (Egypt) Yasmine Ezzat | (Serbia) Mirjana Jovanović (Uzbekistan) Diana Yakovleva | 7–6^{(6)}, 6–3 |
| Win | 3–3 | Apr 2025 | ITF Sharm El Sheikh | W15 | Hard | (Luxembourg) Marie Weckerle | (United Kingdom) Amelia Rajecki (United Kingdom) Ranah Stoiber | 6–2, 6–3 |
| Win | 4–3 | May 2025 | ITF Nottingham, UK | W35 | Hard | (France) Alice Robbe | (United Kingdom) Naiktha Bains (United Kingdom) Holly Hutchinson | 3–6, 6–4, [10–5] |
| Loss | 4–4 | Feb 2026 | ITF Sharm El Sheikh | W15 | Hard | (Germany) Anja Wildgruber | (Turkey) Defne Çırpanlı (Egypt) Sandra Samir | walkover |
