= 1992 Federation Cup Europe/Africa Zone – Knockout Stage =

International tennis competition

The Knockout Stage of the 1992 Federation Cup Europe/Africa Zone was the final stage of the Zonal Competition involving teams from Europe and Africa. Those that qualified for this stage placed first and second in their respective pools.

Placing	Pool A	Pool B	Pool C	Pool D
1	South Africa	Croatia	Slovenia	Latvia
2	Ireland	Greece	Norway	Yugoslavia
3	Estonia	Portugal	Lithuania	Malta
4	Luxembourg	Turkey	Congo	Tunisia

The eight teams were then randomly drawn into a three-stage knockout tournament, with the winner qualifying for the World Group.

== Draw ==
Quarterfinals; 16 April
Greece	0
Latvia	3
Croatia	3
Ireland	0
Norway	0
Slovenia	3
Yugoslavia	0
South Africa	3

Semifinals; 17 April
Latvia	1
Croatia	2
Slovenia	0
South Africa	3

Final; 18 April
Croatia	1
South Africa	2

=== Quarterfinals ===
==== Greece vs. Latvia ====
Greece
0
Olympic T.C., Athens, Greece
16 April 1992
Clay (outdoors)

Latvia
3

			1	2	3
1	(Greece) (Latvia)	Christina Zachariadou; Oksana Bushevitsa	2; 6	3; 6
2	(Greece) (Latvia)	Christína Papadáki; Larisa Neiland	6; 4	3; 6	2; 6
3	(Greece) (Latvia)	Christína Papadáki / Christina Zachariadou; Agnese Blumberga / Larisa Neiland	6^{3} 7^{7}	2; 6

==== Croatia vs. Ireland ====
Croatia
3
Olympic T.C., Athens, Greece
16 April 1992
Clay (outdoors)

Ireland
0

			1	2	3
1	(Croatia) (Republic of Ireland)	Maja Palaveršić; Gina Niland	6; 0	6; 2
2	(Croatia) (Republic of Ireland)	Nadin Ercegović; Siobhán Nicholson	6; 1	6; 1
3	(Croatia) (Republic of Ireland)	Gorana Matić / Maja Murić; Yvonne Doyle / Catriona McCarthy	6; 2	6; 3

==== Norway vs. Slovenia ====
Norway
0
Olympic T.C., Athens, Greece
16 April 1992
Clay (outdoors)

Slovenia
3

			1	2	3
1	(Norway) (Slovenia)	Cathrine Instebø; Tina Vukasovič	1; 6	3; 6
2	(Norway) (Slovenia)	Amy Jonsson-Råholt; Barbara Mulej	3; 6	5; 7
3	(Norway) (Slovenia)	Amy Jonsson-Råholt / Astrid Sunde; Tina Križan / Tina Vukasovič	4; 6	0; 6

==== Yugoslavia vs. South Africa ====
Yugoslavia
0
Olympic T.C., Athens, Greece
16 April 1992
Clay (outdoors)

South Africa
3

			1	2	3
1	(Socialist Federal Republic of Yugoslavia) (South Africa)	Branislava Ivanović; Elna Reinach	0; 6	2; 6
2	(Socialist Federal Republic of Yugoslavia) (South Africa)	Ljudmila Pavlov; Amanda Coetzer	3; 6	0; 6
3	(Socialist Federal Republic of Yugoslavia) (South Africa)	Branislava Ivanović / Marijana Ranđelović; Mariaan de Swardt / Joannette Kruger	0; 6	0; 6

=== Semifinals ===
==== Latvia vs. Croatia ====
Latvia
1
Olympic T.C., Athens, Greece
17 April 1992
Clay (outdoors)

Croatia
2

			1	2	3
1	(Latvia) (Croatia)	Oksana Bushevitsa; Maja Palaveršić	4; 6	6; 2	3; 6
2	(Latvia) (Croatia)	Larisa Neiland; Nadin Ercegović	3; 6	1; 6
3	(Latvia) (Croatia)	Agnese Blumberga / Oksana Bushevitsa; Gorana Matić / Maja Murić	3; 6	6; 3	8; 6

==== Slovenia vs. South Africa ====
Slovenia
0
Olympic T.C., Athens, Greece
16 April 1992
Clay (outdoors)

South Africa
3

			1	2	3
1	(Slovenia) (South Africa)	Tina Križan; Elna Reinach	7^{7} 6^{2}	4; 6	3; 6
2	(Slovenia) (South Africa)	Barbara Mulej; Amanda Coetzer	4; 6	6; 4	1; 6
3	(Slovenia) (South Africa)	Tina Križan / Tina Vukasovič; Mariaan de Swardt / Joannette Kruger	1; 6	3; 6

=== Final ===
==== Croatia vs. South Africa ====
Croatia
1
Olympic T.C., Athens, Greece
16 April 1992
Clay (outdoors)

South Africa
2

			1	2	3
1	(Croatia) (South Africa)	Maja Palaveršić; Elna Reinach	7^{8} 6^{6}	5; 7	6; 3
2	(Croatia) (South Africa)	Nadin Ercegović; Amanda Coetzer	5; 7	6; 4	2; 6
3	(Croatia) (South Africa)	Nadin Ercegović / Maja Murić; Mariaan de Swardt / Elna Reinach	3; 6	1; 6

- South Africa advanced to the World Group, where they were defeated in the first round by Canada, 2–1.

== See also ==
- Fed Cup structure
