= 1992 Federation Cup Europe/Africa Zone =

Subsection of tennis competition

The Europe/Africa Zone was one of three zones of regional Federation Cup qualifying competition in 1992. All ties were played at the Olympic T.C. in Athens, Greece on clay courts.

The sixteen teams were divided into four pools of four to compete in round-robin matches. After each of the ties had been played, the teams that finished first and second in each of the respective pools would then move on to the three-round knockout stage of the competition. The team that won the knockout stage would go on to advance to the World Group.

== Pool Stage ==
Date: 13–15 April

	Pool A	RSA	IRL	EST	LUX
1	South Africa (3–0)		3–0	3–0	3–0
2	Ireland (2–1)	0–3		3–0	3–0
3	Estonia (1–2)	0–3	0–3		2–1
4	Luxembourg (0–3)	0–3	0–3	1–2	

	Pool B	CRO	GRE	POR	TUR
1	Croatia (3–0)		2–1	2–0	3–0
2	Greece (2–1)	1–2		2–1	3–0
3	Portugal (1–2)	0–2	1–2		3–0
4	Turkey (0–3)	0–3	0–3	0–3	

	Pool C	SLO	NOR	LTU	CGO
1	Slovenia (3–0)		3–0	3–0	3–0
2	Norway (2–1)	0–3		2–1	3–0
3	Lithuania (1–2)	0–3	1–2		w/o
4	Congo (0–3)	0–3	0–3	w/o	

	Pool D	LAT	YUG	MLT	TUN
1	Latvia (3–0)		3–0	3–0	3–0
2	Yugoslavia (2–1)	0–3		3–0	3–0
3	Malta (1–2)	0–3	0–3		2–1
4	Tunisia (0–3)	0–3	0–3	1–2	

== Knockout stage ==
Quarterfinals; 16 April
South Africa	3
Yugoslavia	0
Norway	0
Slovenia	3
Croatia	3
Ireland	0
Greece	0
Latvia	3

Semifinals; 17 April
South Africa	3
Slovenia	0
Croatia	2
Latvia	1

Final; 18 April
South Africa	2
Croatia	1

- South Africa advanced to the World Group.

== See also ==
- Fed Cup structure
