= 2003 Fed Cup =

International women's tennis competition

Details
- Duration: 26 April – 23 November
- Edition: 41st

Achievements (singles)

The 2003 Fed Cup was the 41st edition of the most important competition between national teams in women's tennis.

The final took place at the Olympic Stadium in Moscow, Russia on 22–23 November. France defeated the United States, giving France their second title.

== World Group ==
Participating teams
Argentina	Australia	Austria	Belgium
Colombia	Croatia	Czech Republic	France
Germany	Italy	Russia	Slovakia
Slovenia	Spain	Sweden	United States

=== Draw ===
First round 26–27 April
Ettenheim, Germany (Outdoor clay)
1	Slovakia	3
Germany	2
Bree, Belgium (Indoor clay)
Austria	0
5	Belgium	5
Linköping, Sweden (Indoor hard)
7	Italy	3
Sweden	2
Lowell, Massachusetts, United States (Indoor hard)
Czech Republic	0
3	United States	5
Moscow, Russia (Indoor carpet)
4	Russia	4
Croatia	1
Buenos Aires, Argentina (Outdoor clay)
Slovenia	3
8	Argentina	2
Andrézieux-Bouthéon, France (Indoor clay)
6	France	5
Colombia	0
Tarragona, Spain (Outdoor clay)
Australia	2
2	Spain	3

Quarterfinals; 19–20 July
Charleroi, Belgium (Indoor hard)
1	Slovakia	0
5	Belgium	5
Washington, D.C., United States (Outdoor hard)
7	Italy	0
3	United States	5
Portorož, Slovenia (Outdoor clay)
4	Russia	5
Slovenia	0
Oviedo, Spain (Outdoor clay)
6	France	4
2	Spain	1

Semifinals; 19–20 November
Moscow, Russia (Indoor carpet)
5	Belgium	1
3	United States	4
Moscow, Russia (Indoor carpet)
4	Russia	2
6	France	3

Final; 22–23 November
Moscow, Russia (Indoor carpet)
3	United States	1
6	France	4

== World Group play-offs ==
Date: 19–20 July

The eight losing teams in the World Group first round ties and eight winners of the Zonal Group I sections competed in the World Group play-offs for spots in the 2004 World Group.

Venue	Surface	Home team	Score	Visiting team
Pilar, Argentina	Outdoor clay	Argentina	3–2	Hungary
Wollongong, Australia	Indoor hard	Australia	3–2	Colombia
Neudörfl, Austria	Outdoor clay	Austria	4–1	Canada
Varaždin, Croatia	Outdoor clay	Croatia	4–1	Brazil
Durban, South Africa	Outdoor hard	South Africa	1–4	Czech Republic
Jakarta, Indonesia	Outdoor hard	Indonesia	2–3	Germany
Gifu, Japan	Indoor carpet	Japan	4–1	Sweden
Winterthur, Switzerland	Outdoor clay	Switzerland	4–1	Israel

== Americas Zone ==
- Nations in **bold** advanced to the higher level of competition.
- Nations in italics were relegated down to a lower level of competition.

=== Group I ===
Venue: Campinas, Brazil (outdoor clay)

Dates: 23–26 April

Participating teams

- Bahamas
- **Brazil**
- **Canada**
- Cuba
- El Salvador
- Mexico
- Paraguay
- Uruguay

=== Group II ===
Venue: San Juan, Puerto Rico (outdoor hard)

Dates: 23–27 April

Participating teams

- Bermuda
- Bolivia
- **Chile**
- Costa Rica
- Dominican Republic
- Ecuador
- Jamaica
- **Puerto Rico**
- Trinidad and Tobago
- Venezuela

== Asia/Oceania Zone ==
- Nations in **bold** advanced to the higher level of competition.
- Nations in italics were relegated down to a lower level of competition.

=== Group I ===
Venue: Tokyo, Japan (outdoor hard)

Dates: 21–25 April

Participating teams

- China
- Chinese Taipei
- Hong Kong
- **Indonesia**
- **Japan**
- Kazakhstan
- Malaysia
- New Zealand
- South Korea
- Thailand
- Uzbekistan

=== Group II ===
Venue: Tokyo, Japan (outdoor hard)

Dates: 21–24 April

Participating teams

- **India**
- Kyrgyzstan
- Pacific Oceania
- **Philippines**

== Europe/Africa Zone ==
- Nations in **bold** advanced to the higher level of competition.
- Nations in italics were relegated down to a lower level of competition.

=== Group I ===
Venue: Estoril, Portugal (outdoor clay)

Dates: 21–26 April

Participating teams

- Belarus
- Bulgaria
- Estonia
- Denmark
- Georgia
- Great Britain
- **Hungary**
- Ireland
- **Israel**
- Luxembourg
- Netherlands
- Poland
- Romania
- **South Africa**
- **Switzerland**
- Ukraine
- Yugoslavia

=== Group II ===
Venue: Estoril, Portugal (outdoor clay)

Dates: 28 April – 3 May

Participating teams

- Algeria
- Bosnia and Herzegovina
- Botswana
- Egypt
- Finland
- **Greece**
- Latvia
- **Lithuania**
- Malta
- Morocco
- Norway
- Portugal
- Turkey

== Rankings ==
The rankings were measured after the three points during the year that play took place, and were collated by combining points earned from the previous four years.

28 April
Rank	Nation	Points	Move
1	Slovakia	22,400.0	Steady
2	Spain	21,850.0	Steady
3	Belgium	17,150.0	Steady
4	United States	13,600.0	Steady
5	Russia	13,100.0	Steady
6	France	10,100.0	Steady
7	Italy	8,600.0	Steady
8	Austria	6,500.0	Steady
9	Argentina	5,850.0	Steady
10	Slovenia	4,475.0	▲2

21 July
Rank	Nation	Points	Move
1	Slovakia	21,400.0	Steady
2	Belgium	21,350.0	▲1
3	Spain	20,850.0	▼1
4	United States	16,000.0	Steady
5	Russia	15,000.0	Steady
6	France	13,780.0	Steady
7	Italy	7,600.0	Steady
8	Austria	6,350.0	Steady
9	Argentina	6,100.0	Steady
10	Germany	5,350.0	▲1

24 November
Rank	Nation	Points	Move
1	France	26,640.0	▲5
2	Slovakia	17,900.0	▼1
3	Belgium	17,100.0	▼1
4	United States	16,680.0	Steady
5	Spain	16,350.0	▼2
6	Russia	12,750.0	▼1
7	Italy	7,600.0	Steady
8	Austria	6,350.0	Steady
9	Argentina	5,350.0	Steady
10	Germany	4,600.0	Steady
