= 1992 Federation Cup Europe/Africa Zone – Pool C =

International tennis competition

Group C of the 1992 Federation Cup Europe/Africa Zone was one of four pools in the Europe/Africa zone of the 1992 Federation Cup. Four teams competed in a round robin competition, with the top two teams advancing to the knockout stage.

	(Slovenia) SLO	(Norway) NOR	(Lithuania) LIT	(Republic of the Congo) CGO	RR; W–L	Set; W–L	Game; W–L	Standings
Slovenia		3–0	3–0	3–0	3–0	18–0	109–23	1
Norway	0–3		2–1	3–0	2–1	10–9	78–70	2
Lithuania	0–3	1–2		w/o	1–2	3–10	42–69	3
Congo	0–3	0–3	w/o		0–3	0–12	5–72	4

== Slovenia vs. Congo ==
Slovenia
3
Olympic T.C., Athens, Greece
13 April 1992
Clay (outdoors)

Congo
0

			1	2	3
1	(Slovenia) (Republic of the Congo)	Tina Križan; Maria Jose Likibi	6; 0	6; 0
2	(Slovenia) (Republic of the Congo)	Barbara Mulej; Michelle Likibi	6; 1	6; 0
3	(Slovenia) (Republic of the Congo)	Tina Križan / Barbara Mulej; Maria Jose Likibi / Michelle Likibi	6; 0	6; 1

== Norway vs. Lithuania ==
Norway
2
Olympic T.C., Athens, Greece
13 April 1992
Clay (outdoors)

Lithuania
1

			1	2	3
1	(Norway) (Lithuania)	Cathrine Instebø; Raminta Mackevičiūtė	1; 6	3; 6
2	(Norway) (Lithuania)	Amy Jonsson-Råholt; Galina Misiuriova	6; 3	6; 4
3	(Norway) (Lithuania)	Amy Jonsson-Råholt / Astrid Sunde; Raminta Mackevičiūtė / Galina Misiuriova	4; 6	6; 4	6; 2

== Slovenia vs. Lithuania ==
Slovenia
3
Olympic T.C., Athens, Greece
14 April 1992
Clay (outdoors)

Lithuania
0

			1	2	3
1	(Slovenia) (Lithuania)	Tina Križan; Edita Liachovičiūtė	6; 1	6; 1
2	(Slovenia) (Lithuania)	Barbara Mulej; Galina Misiuriova	6; 1	6; 2
3	(Slovenia) (Lithuania)	Tina Križan / Barbara Mulej; Edita Liachovičiūtė / Galina Misiuriova	7; 5	6; 1

== Norway vs. Congo ==
Norway
3
Olympic T.C., Athens, Greece
14 April 1992
Clay (outdoors)

Congo
0

			1	2	3
1	(Norway) (Republic of the Congo)	Siri Mittet; Maria Jose Likibi	6; 1	6; 0
2	(Norway) (Republic of the Congo)	Amy Jonsson-Råholt; Michelle Likibi	6; 1	6; 0
3	(Norway) (Republic of the Congo)	Amy Jonsson-Råholt / Astrid Sunde; Maria Jose Likibi / Michelle Likibi	6; 1	6; 0

== Slovenia vs. Norway ==
Slovenia
3
Olympic T.C., Athens, Greece
15 April 1992
Clay (outdoors)

Norway
0

			1	2	3
1	(Slovenia) (Norway)	Tina Vukasovič; Cathrine Instebø	6; 1	6; 2
2	(Slovenia) (Norway)	Barbara Mulej; Amy Jonsson-Råholt	6; 1	6; 3
3	(Slovenia) (Norway)	Tina Križan / Tina Vukasovič; Siri Littet / Astrid Sunde	6; 2	6; 1

== See also ==
- Fed Cup structure
