= 1992 Federation Cup Europe/Africa Zone – Pool D =

Group D of the 1992 Federation Cup Europe/Africa Zone was one of four pools in the Europe/Africa zone of the 1992 Federation Cup. Four teams competed in a round robin competition, with the top two teams advancing to the knockout stage.

	(Latvia) LAT	(Federal Republic of Yugoslavia) YUG	(Malta) MLT	(Tunisia) TUN	RR; W–L	Set; W–L	Game; W–L	Standings
Latvia		3–0	3–0	3–0	3–0	18–0	108–26	1
Yugoslavia	0–3		3–0	3–0	2–1	12–7	85–71	2
Malta	0–3	0–3		2–1	1–2	6–15	79–105	3
Tunisia	0–3	0–3	1–2		0–3	3–17	52–113	4

== Latvia vs. Yugoslavia ==
Latvia
3
Olympic T.C., Athens, Greece
13 April 1992
Clay (outdoors)

Yugoslavia
0

			1	2	3
1	(Latvia) (Federal Republic of Yugoslavia)	Oksana Bushevitsa; Branislava Ivanović	6; 3	6; 0
2	(Latvia) (Federal Republic of Yugoslavia)	Larisa Neiland; Ljudmila Pavlov	6; 3	6; 1
3	(Latvia) (Federal Republic of Yugoslavia)	Oksana Bushevitsa / Larisa Neiland; Branislava Ivanović / Ljudmila Pavlov	6; 2	6; 0

== Matla vs. Tunisia ==
Malta
2
Olympic T.C., Athens, Greece
13 April 1992
Clay (outdoors)

Tunisia
1

			1	2	3
1	(Malta) (Tunisia)	Helen Asciak; Issem Essaies	6; 1	6; 0
2	(Malta) (Tunisia)	Carol Cassar-Torreggiani; Selima Sfar	5; 7	6; 3	6; 3
3	(Malta) (Tunisia)	Helen Asciak / Lisa Camenzuli; Issem Essaies / Selima Sfar	1; 6	6; 4	4; 6

== Latvia vs. Malta ==
Latvia
3
Olympic T.C., Athens, Greece
14 April 1992
Clay (outdoors)

Malta
0

			1	2	3
1	(Latvia) (Malta)	Oksana Bushevitsa; Helen Asciak	6; 1	6; 0
2	(Latvia) (Malta)	Larisa Neiland; Carol Cassar-Torreggiani	6; 2	6; 1
3	(Latvia) (Malta)	Larisa Neiland / Gabija Talberga; Helen Asciak / Carol Cassar-Torreggiani	6; 2	6; 2

== Yugoslavia vs. Tunisia ==
Yugoslavia
3
Olympic T.C., Athens, Greece
14 April 1992
Clay (outdoors)

Tunisia
0

			1	2	3
1	(Federal Republic of Yugoslavia) (Tunisia)	Branislava Ivanović; Issem Essaies	6; 1	6; 1
2	(Federal Republic of Yugoslavia) (Tunisia)	Ljudmila Pavlov; Selima Sfar	7^{8} 6^{6}	6; 1
3	(Federal Republic of Yugoslavia) (Tunisia)	Ljudmila Pavlov / Marijana Ranđelović; Issem Essaies / Selima Sfar	6; 4	6; 0

== Latvia vs. Tunisia ==
Latvia
3
Olympic T.C., Athens, Greece
15 April 1992
Clay (outdoors)

Tunisia
0

			1	2	3
1	(Latvia) (Tunisia)	Oksana Bushevitsa; Issem Essaies	6; 1	6; 0
2	(Latvia) (Tunisia)	Agnese Blumberga; Selima Sfar	6; 2	6; 1
3	(Latvia) (Tunisia)	Agnese Blumberga / Gabija Talberga; Issem Essaies / Selima Sfar	6; 2	6; 3

== Yugoslavia vs. Malta ==
Yugoslavia
3
Olympic T.C., Athens, Greece
15 April 1992
Clay (outdoors)

Malta
0

			1	2	3
1	(Federal Republic of Yugoslavia) (Malta)	Branislava Ivanović; Helen Asciak	6; 3	7; 5
2	(Federal Republic of Yugoslavia) (Malta)	Ljudmila Pavlov; Carol Cassar-Torreggiani	6; 2	6; 0
3	(Federal Republic of Yugoslavia) (Malta)	Branislava Ivanović / Ljudmila Pavlov; Helen Asciak / Carol Cassar-Torreggiani	6; 3	2; 6	6; 3

== See also ==
- Fed Cup structure
