= 1992 Federation Cup Europe/Africa Zone – Pool A =

Group A of the 1992 Federation Cup Europe/Africa Zone was one of four pools in the Europe/Africa zone of the 1992 Federation Cup. Four teams competed in a round robin competition, with the top two teams advancing to the knockout stage.

	(South Africa) RSA	(Republic of Ireland) IRL	(Estonia) EST	(Luxembourg) LUX	RR; W–L	Set; W–L	Game; W–L	Standings
South Africa		3–0	3–0	3–0	3–0	18–1	116–26	1
Ireland	0–3		3–0	3–0	2–1	12–10	96–100	2
Estonia	0–3	0–3		2–1	1–2	7–15	78–122	3
Luxembourg	0–3	0–3	1–2		0–3	5–16	76–114	4

== South Africa vs. Luxembourg ==
South Africa
3
Olympic T.C., Athens, Greece
13 April 1992
Clay (outdoors)

Luxembourg
0

			1	2	3
1	(South Africa) (Luxembourg)	Mariaan de Swardt; Rosabel Moyen	6; 4	6; 2
2	(South Africa) (Luxembourg)	Amanda Coetzer; Anne Kremer	6; 0	6; 0
3	(South Africa) (Luxembourg)	Joannette Kruger / Elna Reinach; Anne Kremer / Rosabel Moyen	6; 0	6; 0

== Ireland vs. Estonia ==
Ireland
3
Olympic T.C., Athens, Greece
13 April 1992
Clay (outdoors)

Estonia
0

			1	2	3
1	(Republic of Ireland) (Estonia)	Gina Niland; Kaja Kond	6; 4	6; 3
2	(Republic of Ireland) (Estonia)	Siobhán Nicholson; Helene Holter	5; 7	6; 2	6; 2
3	(Republic of Ireland) (Estonia)	Siobhán Nicholson / Gina Niland; Piret Ilves / Kaja Kond	6; 2	6^{6} 7^{8}	6; 2

== South Africa vs. Estonia ==
South Africa
3
Olympic T.C., Athens, Greece
14 April 1992
Clay (outdoors)

Estonia
0

			1	2	3
1	(South Africa) (Estonia)	Mariaan de Swardt; Kaja Kond	6; 2	3; 6	7; 5
2	(South Africa) (Estonia)	Amanda Coetzer; Helene Holter	6; 0	6; 0
3	(South Africa) (Estonia)	Amanda Coetzer / Elna Reinach; Helene Holter / Kaja Kond	6; 0	6; 1

== Ireland vs. Luxembourg ==
Ireland
3
Olympic T.C., Athens, Greece
14 April 1992
Clay (outdoors)

Luxembourg
0

			1	2	3
1	(Republic of Ireland) (Luxembourg)	Gina Niland; Rosabel Moyen	6; 4	7^{7} 6^{5}
2	(Republic of Ireland) (Luxembourg)	Siobhán Nicholson; Anne Kremer	1; 6	6; 3	7; 5
3	(Republic of Ireland) (Luxembourg)	Yvonne Doyle / Catriona McCarthy; Anne Kremer / Michele Wagner	6; 2	4; 6	6; 3

== South Africa vs. Ireland ==
South Africa
3
Olympic T.C., Athens, Greece
15 April 1992
Clay (outdoors)

Ireland
0

			1	2	3
1	(South Africa) (Republic of Ireland)	Elna Reinach; Catriona McCarthy	6; 1	6; 0
2	(South Africa) (Republic of Ireland)	Amanda Coetzer; Gina Niland	6; 1	6; 1
3	(South Africa) (Republic of Ireland)	Mariaan de Swardt / Elna Reinach; Yvonne Doyle / Siobhán Nicholson	6; 1	6; 2

== Estonia vs. Luxembourg ==
Estonia
2
Olympic T.C., Athens, Greece
15 April 1992
Clay (outdoors)

Luxembourg
1

			1	2	3
1	(Estonia) (Luxembourg)	Kaja Kond; Rosabel Moyen	6; 4	6; 4
2	(Estonia) (Luxembourg)	Helene Holter; Anne Kremer	1; 6	7; 5	6; 3
3	(Estonia) (Luxembourg)	Piret Ilves / Kaja Kond; Anne Kremer / Rosabel Moyen	3; 6	6^{5} 7^{7}

== See also ==
- Fed Cup structure
