= List of Slovenia Fed Cup team representatives =

This is a list of tennis players who have represented the Slovenia Fed Cup team in an official Fed Cup match. Slovenia have taken part in the competition since 1992.

== Players ==
Player	W-L (Total)	W-L (Singles)	W-L (Doubles)	Ties	Debut
Ajda Brumen	0 – 2	-	0 – 2	2	2002
Polona Hercog	12 – 9	9 – 7	3 – 2	15	2007
Tina Hergold	2 – 2	2 – 1	0 – 1	4	1999
Dalila Jakupović	7 – 9	6 – 5	1 – 4	11	2014
Tjaša Jezernik	1 – 6	-	1 – 6	7	1995
Kaja Juvan	4 – 7	2 – 5	2 – 2	9	2017
Andreja Klepač	14 – 24	7 – 10	7 – 14	29	2004
Nastja Kolar	0 – 7	0 – 5	0 – 2	4	2012
Tina Križan	42 – 30	17 – 11	25 – 19	46	1992
Karin Lušnic	7 – 4	1 – 1	6 – 3	9	1993
Tadeja Majerič	6 – 2	3 – 2	3 – 0	7	2007
Maja Matevžič	10 – 5	8 – 3	2 – 2	12	1998
Barbara Mulej	19 – 8	16 – 7	3 – 1	24	1992
Diana Nakič	1 – 1	-	1 – 1	2	2006
Tina Obrež	1 – 2	-	1 – 2	3	2006
Manca Pislak	3 – 0	-	3 – 0	3	2015
Tina Pisnik	20 – 13	17 – 7	3 – 6	21	1998
Nina Potočnik	1 – 2	1 – 0	0 – 2	5	2018
Nika Radišič	1 – 1	-	1 – 1	4	2018
Petra Rampre	1 – 9	0 – 5	1 – 4	6	1998
Polona Reberšak	2 – 1	2 – 1	-	3	2006
Tina Rupert	0 – 2	0 – 1	0 – 1	2	2013
Katarina Srebotnik	33 – 20	19 – 12	14 – 8	32	1997
Tjaša Šrimpf	1 – 3	0 – 3	1 – 0	3	2013
Sandra Volk	0 – 1	-	0 – 1	1	2005
Tina Vukasovič	5 – 1	3 – 0	2 – 1	4	1992
Maša Zec Peškirič	8 – 22	6 – 13	2 – 9	19	2006
Tamara Zidanšek	5 – 3	5 – 1	0 – 2	6	2017
