= Amanda Coetzer =

South African tennis player (born 1971)

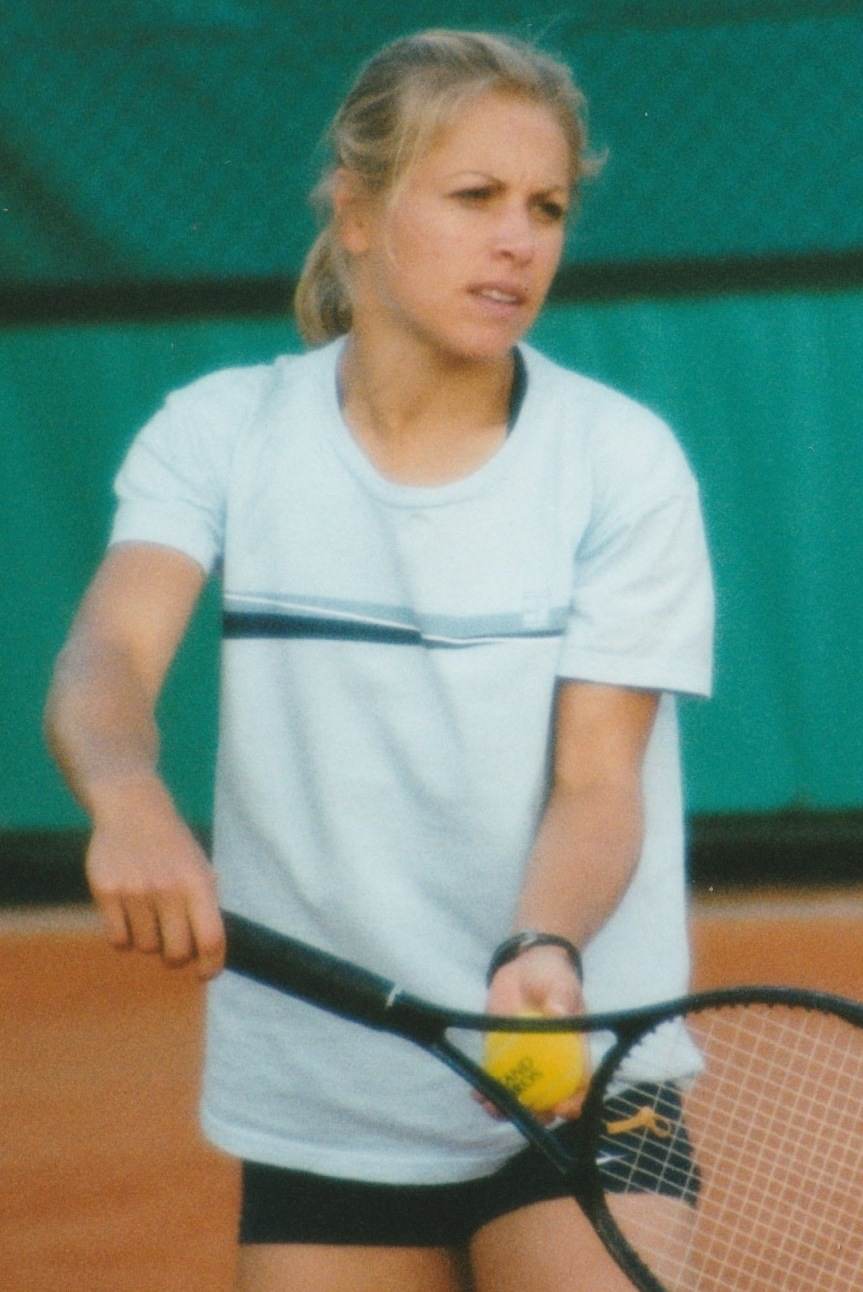
- Coetzer at the 2000 French Open
- Country (sports): South Africa
- Born: 22 October 1971 (age 55) Hoopstad, South Africa
- Height: 1.58 m (5 ft 2 in)
- Turned pro: January 1988
- Retired: June 2004
- Plays: Right-handed (two-handed backhand)
- Prize money: $5,594,821

Singles
- Career record: 568–337 (62.8%)
- Career titles: 9
- Highest ranking: No. 3 (3 November 1997)

Grand Slam singles results
- Australian Open: SF (1996, 1997)
- French Open: SF (1997)
- Wimbledon: 4R (1994)
- US Open: QF (1994, 1996, 1998)

Doubles
- Career record: 269–219
- Career titles: 9
- Highest ranking: No. 15 (27 September 1993)

Grand Slam doubles results
- Australian Open: QF (2002)
- French Open: SF (1993, 1994)
- Wimbledon: 3R (1998, 2001)
- US Open: F (1993)

Mixed doubles
- Career record: 18–18

Grand Slam mixed doubles results
- Australian Open: 2R (1995, 2001)
- French Open: QF (1994)
- Wimbledon: QF (2000)
- US Open: 2R (1992, 1993)

Team competitions
- Fed Cup: QF (1995, 1996), record 31–13
- Hopman Cup: W (2000)

Amanda Coetzer (born 22 October 1971) is a South African former professional tennis player. She was ranked as high as world No. 3 by the Women's Tennis Association, achieved in November 1997. Coetzer won nine WTA Tour titles in singles and nine in doubles, and reached three major singles semifinals (at the 1996 and 1997 Australian Opens and the 1997 French Open) and one major doubles final (at the 1993 US Open). Coetzer earned a reputation for regularly beating players who were ranked higher than her. By virtue of scoring so many upset wins in spite of her 5'2" (1.58m) stature, she gained the nickname: "The Little Assassin".

== Personal life ==
Coetzer was born in Hoopstad, South Africa, to Nico and Suska Coetzer. She started playing tennis at the age of six. During her career, she resided primarily in Hilton Head, South Carolina and was coached by Gavin Hopper, later by Lori McNeil. As a photographer's model she appeared as a Sunshine Girl in the Canadian Sun newspaper chain. She is married to the Hollywood film producer Arnon Milchan. They have two children, Shimon (born 2009) and Olivia (born 2011).

In 1998, Coetzer was featured in All Star Tennis '99, a tennis video game released on PlayStation and Nintendo 64.

== Career ==
Coetzer's breakthrough year was in 1992. She beat world No. 3, Gabriela Sabatini, in Boca Raton, and Jennifer Capriati at the Italian Open, entering into the top 20 in August.

In 1993, Coetzer won her first WTA Tour title in Melbourne, defeating Naoko Sawamatsu in the final, and reached the final of the US Open women's doubles with Inés Gorrochategui.

At the Canada Masters in 1995, Coetzer defeated three players ranked in the world's top 5 – Steffi Graf (No. 1), Jana Novotná (No. 4) and Mary Pierce (No. 5) – before finally losing to Monica Seles in the final. The defeat of Graf ended a 32-match winning-streak for the German. At the end of the year, Coetzer was awarded the WTA Karen Krantzcke Sportsmanship Award (voted for by other players).

At the Australian Open in 1996, Coetzer became the first South African woman in the Open Era to reach a Grand Slam semifinal, where she lost in three sets to Anke Huber.

In 1997, she reached the Australian Open semifinals for the second consecutive year, defeating world No. 1, Steffi Graf, in the fourth round. She beat Graf for a second time that year at the German Open in May (inflicting Graf's worst-ever loss: 6–0, 6–1 in just 56 minutes), and then, in the quarterfinals of the French Open, she defeated Graf yet again to become one of only four to defeat her more than once in Grand Slam matches. Coetzer lost in the French Open semifinals to eventual champion Iva Majoli. She broke into the top 10 in June and top 5 in August, and in Leipzig Coetzer beat Martina Hingis, who by then had taken over the world No. 1 ranking. Coetzer won two singles titles that year – in Budapest and Luxembourg, reached 15 semifinals (or better) in total and was awarded the Karen Krantzcke Sportsmanship Award for a second time, the Most Improved Player and Diamond Aces awards (all WTA).

Coetzer won the biggest title of her career in 1998, at the Charleston Open. She also beat Conchita Martínez on her way to a third quarterfinals showing at the US Open.

In 1999, Coetzer defeated world No. 1, Lindsay Davenport, and world No. 4, Monica Seles, on her way to the final of Tokyo, thereby becoming the first player to ever defeat Graf, Hingis and Davenport while they were ranked number one.

Coetzer teamed-up with Wayne Ferreira to win the 2000 Hopman Cup for South Africa. She beat world No. 3, Venus Williams, in Hamburg and also reached the final of the German Open in Berlin.

In 2001, she qualified for her ninth consecutive Year-end championships, and finished her tenth consecutive season in the world's top 20.

Coetzer retired in 2004. Overall, she won 18 WTA tournament titles, nine in singles and nine in doubles. Her final singles title was won in Acapulco in 2003, and her career prize-money earnings totalled $6 million.

== Grand Slam finals ==
=== Doubles: 1 runner–up ===
Result	Year	Championship	Surface	Partner	Opponents	Score
Loss	1993	US Open	Hard	(Argentina) Inés Gorrochategui	(Spain) Arantxa Sánchez Vicario (Czech Republic) Helena Suková	6–4, 6–2

== WTA career finals ==
=== Singles: 21 (9 titles, 12 runner-ups) ===
Legend Grand Slam (–) Tier I (1–3) Tier II (1–5) Tier III, IV & V (7–4)	Finals by surface Hard (2–6) Grass (–) Clay (6–3) Carpet (1–3)

Result	W–L	Date	Tournament	Tier	Surface	Opponent	Score
Loss	0–1	Oct 1991	Dorado, Puerto Rico	Tier IV	Hard	(France) Julie Halard	5–7, 5–7
Win	1–1	Jan 1993	Melbourne, Australia	Tier IV	Hard	(Japan) Naoko Sawamatsu	6–2, 6–3
Loss	1–2	Feb 1993	Indian Wells, US	Tier II	Hard	(United States) Mary Joe Fernández	6–3, 1–6, 6–7^{(6–8)}
Win	2–2	Sep 1993	Tokyo, Japan	Tier II	Hard	(Japan) Kimiko Date	6–3, 6–2
Loss	2–3	Feb 1994	Indian Wells, US	Tier II	Hard	(West Germany) Steffi Graf	0–6, 4–6
Win	3–3	May 1994	Prague, Czech Republic	Tier IV	Clay	(Sweden) Åsa Carlsson	6–1, 7–6^{(16–14)}
Loss	3–4	Aug 1995	Toronto, Canada	Tier I	Hard	(United States) Monica Seles	0–6, 1–6
Loss	3–5	Oct 1995	Brighton, England	Tier II	Carpet (i)	(United States) Mary Joe Fernández	4–6, 5–7
Loss	3–6	Feb 1996	Oklahoma City, US	Tier III	Hard (i)	(Netherlands) Brenda Schultz-McCarthy	3–6, 2–6
Win	4–6	Apr 1997	Budapest, Hungary	Tier IV	Clay	(Belgium) Sabine Appelmans	6–1, 6–3
Loss	4–7	Sep 1997	Leipzig, Germany	Tier II	Carpet (i)	(Czech Republic) Jana Novotná	2–6, 6–4, 3–6
Win	5–7	Oct 1997	Luxembourg City, Luxembourg	Tier III	Carpet (i)	(Austria) Barbara Paulus	6–4, 3–6, 7–5
Win	6–7	Mar 1998	Charleston, US	Tier I	Clay	(Romania) Irina Spîrlea	6–3, 6–4
Loss	6–8	Feb 1999	Tokyo, Japan	Tier I	Carpet (i)	(Switzerland) Martina Hingis	2–6, 1–6
Loss	6–9	Feb 1999	Oklahoma City, US	Tier III	Hard (i)	(United States) Venus Williams	4–6, 0–6
Loss	6–10	May 2000	Berlin, Germany	Tier I	Clay	(Spain) Conchita Martínez	1–6, 2–6
Win	7–10	May 2000	Antwerp, Belgium	Tier IV	Clay	(Spain) Cristina Torrens Valero	4–6, 6–2, 6–3
Win	8–10	Feb 2001	Acapulco, Mexico	Tier III	Clay	(Russia) Elena Dementieva	2–6, 6–1, 6–2
Loss	8–11	Apr 2001	Amelia Island, US	Tier II	Clay	(France) Amélie Mauresmo	4–6, 5–7
Loss	8–12	Feb 2003	Memphis, US	Tier III	Clay	(United States) Lisa Raymond	3–6, 2–6
Win	9–12	Feb 2003	Acapulco, Mexico	Tier III	Clay	(Argentina) Mariana Díaz Oliva	7–5, 6–3

=== Doubles: 23 (9 titles, 14 runner-ups) ===
Legend Grand Slam tournaments (0–1) Tier I (1–2) Tier II (3–7) Tier III, IV & V (5–4)	Finals by surface Hard (4–6) Grass (0–0) Clay (5–7) Carpet (0–1)

Result	No.	Date	Tournament	Surface	Partner	Opponents	Score
Win	1.	Apr 1992	Taranto Trophy, Italy	Clay	(Argentina) Inés Gorrochategui	(Australia) Rachel McQuillan (Czechoslovakia) Radka Zrubáková	4–6, 6–3, 7–6^{(0)}
Loss	1.	Jul 1992	Austrian Open	Clay	(Germany) Wiltrud Probst	(France) Alexia Dechaume (Argentina) Florencia Labat	3–6, 3–6
Loss	2.	Sep 1992	Taipei Championship, Taiwan	Hard	(United States) Cammy MacGregor	(Australia) Jo-Anne Faull (New Zealand) Julie Richardson	6–3, 3–6, 2–6
Win	2.	Oct 1992	Puerto Rico Open	Hard	(South Africa) Elna Reinach	(United States) Gigi Fernández (United States) Kathy Rinaldi	6–2, 4–6, 6–2
Loss	3.	Apr 1993	Amelia Island Championships, U.S.	Clay	(Argentina) Inés Gorrochategui	(Switzerland) Manuela Maleeva-Fragniere (Georgia (country)) Leila Meskhi	6–3, 3–6, 4–6
Loss	4.	Aug 1993	US Open	Hard	(Argentina) Inés Gorrochategui	(Spain) Arantxa Sánchez Vicario (Czech Republic) Helena Suková	4–6, 2–6
Loss	5.	Sep 1993	Tokyo International Championships, Japan	Hard	(United States) Linda Wild	(United States) Lisa Raymond (United States) Chanda Rubin	4–6, 1–6
Loss	6.	Nov 1993	San Jose Open, United States	Carpet (i)	(Argentina) Inés Gorrochategui	(United States) Patty Fendick (United States) Meredith McGrath	2–6, 0–6
Loss	7.	Apr 1994	Amelia Island Championships, U.S.	Clay	(Argentina) Inés Gorrochategui	(Latvia) Larisa Neiland (Spain) Arantxa Sánchez Vicario	2–6, 7–6^{(6)}, 4–6
Win	3.	May 1994	Prague Open, Czech Republic	Clay	(United States) Linda Wild	(Netherlands) Kristie Boogert (Italy) Laura Golarsa	6–4, 3–6, 6–2
Win	4.	Apr 1995	Amelia Island Championships, U.S.	Clay	(Argentina) Inés Gorrochategui	(United States) Nicole Arendt (Netherlands) Manon Bollegraf	6–2, 3–6, 6–2
Win	5.	May 1995	German Open	Clay	(Argentina) Inés Gorrochategui	(Latvia) Larisa Neiland (Argentina) Gabriela Sabatini	4–6, 7–6^{(3)}, 6–2
Loss	8.	Sep 1995	Tokyo International Championships	Hard	(United States) Linda Wild	(United States) Lindsay Davenport (United States) Mary Joe Fernández	3–6, 2–6
Win	6.	Sep 1996	Tokyo International Championships	Hard	(France) Mary Pierce	(South Korea) Park Sung-hee (Taiwan) Wang Shi-ting	6–1, 7–6^{(5)}
Win	7.	Apr 1997	Budapest Grand Prix, Hungary	Clay	(France) Alexandra Fusai	(Czech Republic) Eva Martincová (Germany) Elena Wagner	6–3, 6–1
Loss	9.	May 1998	Italian Open	Clay	(Spain) Arantxa Sánchez Vicario	(Spain) Virginia Ruano Pascual (Argentina) Paola Suárez	6–7^{(1)}, 4–6
Loss	10.	Feb 1999	U.S. Indoor Championships	Hard (i)	(South Africa) Jessica Steck	(United States) Lisa Raymond (Australia) Rennae Stubbs	3–6, 4–6
Loss	11.	Apr 1999	Barclay Cup Hamburg, Germany	Clay	(Czech Republic) Jana Novotná	(Latvia) Larisa Neiland (Spain) Arantxa Sánchez Vicario	2–6, 1–6
Loss	12.	Sep 1999	Tokyo Princess Cup, Japan	Hard	(Australia) Jelena Dokic	(Spain) Conchita Martínez (Argentina) Patricia Tarabini	7–6^{(5)}, 4–6, 2–6
Loss	13.	May 2000	German Open	Clay	(United States) Corina Morariu	(Spain) Conchita Martínez (Spain) Arantxa Sánchez Vicario	6–3, 2–6, 6–7^{(7)}
Win	8.	Feb 2001	U.S. Indoor Championships	Hard (i)	(United States) Lori McNeil	(Taiwan) Janet Lee (Indonesia) Wynne Prakusya	6–3, 2–6, 6–0
Loss	14.	May 2001	Internationaux de Strasbourg, France	Clay	(United States) Lori McNeil	(Italy) Silvia Farina Elia (Uzbekistan) Iroda Tulyaganova	1–6, 6–7^{(0)}
Win	9.	Sep 2001	Brasil Open	Hard	(United States) Lori McNeil	(United States) Nicole Arendt (Argentina) Patricia Tarabini	6–7^{(8)}, 6–2, 6–4

== Grand Slam singles performance timeline ==
Key
W	F	SF	QF	#R	RR	Q#	P#	DNQ	A	Z#	PO	G	S	B	NMS	NTI	P	NH

(W) winner; (F) finalist; (SF) semifinalist; (QF) quarterfinalist; (#R) rounds 4, 3, 2, 1; (RR) round-robin stage; (Q#) qualification round; (P#) preliminary round; (DNQ) did not qualify; (A) absent; (Z#) Davis/Fed Cup Zonal Group (with number indication) or (PO) play-off; (G) gold, (S) silver or (B) bronze Olympic/Paralympic medal; (NMS) not a Masters tournament; (NTI) not a Tier I tournament; (P) postponed; (NH) not held; (SR) strike rate (events won / competed); (W–L) win–loss record.

Tournament	1988	1989	1990	1991	1992	1993	1994	1995	1996	1997	1998	1999	2000	2001	2002	2003	2004	SR	W–L	W%
Grand Slam tournaments
Australian Open	A	A	A	A	A	1R	2R	3R	SF	SF	4R	4R	2R	QF	4R	4R	2R	0 / 12	31–12	72%
French Open	A	4R	1R	2R	3R	2R	4R	2R	4R	SF	1R	1R	3R	3R	1R	1R	A	0 / 15	23–15	61%
Wimbledon	Q3	1R	2R	2R	A	2R	4R	2R	2R	2R	2R	3R	2R	3R	2R	2R	A	0 / 14	17–14	55%
US Open	Q1	1R	1R	1R	3R	3R	QF	1R	QF	4R	QF	1R	3R	1R	3R	3R	A	0 / 15	25–15	63%
Win–loss	0–0	3–3	1–3	2–3	4–2	4–4	11–4	4–4	13–4	14–4	8–4	5–4	6–4	8–4	6–4	6–4	1–1	0 / 56	96–56	63%
Year-end championship
Tour Championships	A	A	A	A	A	QF	1R	1R	1R	1R	1R	1R	QF	1R	A	A	A	0 / 9	2–9	18%
Tier I tournaments
Tokyo	Tier III		Tier II			A	A	A	A	QF	SF	F	QF	2R	2R	1R	A	0 / 7	10–7	59%
Boca Raton	Tier II			2R	SF	Tier II			Not Held									0 / 2	5–2	71%
Indian Wells	NH	T III	Tier II							2R	3R	3R	2R	A	QF	QF	A	0 / 6	8–6	57%
Miami	A	3R	2R	2R	QF	4R	4R	4R	3R	2R	4R	QF	QF	4R	4R	2R	A	0 / 15	26–15	63%
Charleston	Tier II		A	2R	3R	QF	3R	3R	2R	QF	W	3R	QF	QF	QF	3R	A	1 / 13	28–12	70%
Berlin	A	2R	1R	3R	A	A	A	2R	2R	SF	3R	1R	F	QF	1R	A	A	0 / 11	15–11	58%
Rome	T IV	T II	2R	2R	SF	3R	2R	3R	A	3R	2R	2R	A	A	A	2R	A	0 / 10	13–10	57%
San Diego	T V	T IV	Tier III			Tier II											A	0 / 0	0–0	0%
Montreal / Toronto	Tier II		A	A	3R	3R	3R	F	3R	QF	3R	QF	2R	3R	3R	3R	A	0 / 12	22–12	65%
Moscow	NH	Tier V			Not Held		Tier III			A	A	A	A	A	SF	1R	A	0 / 2	3–2	60%
Zürich	T IV	T III	Tier II			A	A	A	1R	2R	QF	QF	2R	2R	2R	1R	A	0 / 8	7–8	47%
Philadelphia	Not Held			Tier II		QF	1R	1R	Tier II					Not Held		Tier II		0 / 3	2–3	40%
Career statistics
Year-end ranking	157	63	76	67	17	15	18	19	14	4	17	11	12	19	21	25	286			

== Best Grand Slam results details ==
	Australian Open	
1996 Australian Open (16th Seed)
Round	Opponent	Score
1R	(Austria) Melanie Schnell	6–2, 6–2
2R	(Germany) Sabine Hack	6–1, 6–1
3R	(Japan) Rika Hiraki (Q)	6–3, 6–1
4R	(Russia) Elena Likhovtseva	6–3, 6–3
QF	(Switzerland) Martina Hingis	7–5, 4–6, 6–1
SF	(Germany) Anke Huber (8)	6–4, 4–6, 2–6
1997 Australian Open (12th Seed)
Round	Opponent	Score
1R	(Russia) Anna Kournikova	6–2, 6–2
2R	(Germany) Jana Kandarr	6–1, 7–6^{(7–4)}
3R	(Spain) Magüi Serna (Q)	6–3, 6–2
4R	(Germany) Steffi Graf (1)	6–2, 7–5
QF	(United States) Kimberly Po	6–4, 6–1
SF	(France) Mary Pierce	5–7, 1–6

	French Open	
1997 French Open (11th Seed)
Round	Opponent	Score
1R	(Italy) Rita Grande	6–4, 6–0
2R	(United States) Amy Frazier	7–6^{(7–5)}, 6–4
3R	(Germany) Meike Babel	6–4, 6–2
4R	(Spain) Conchita Martínez (7)	6–7^{(4–7)}, 6–4, 6–3
QF	(Germany) Steffi Graf (2)	6–1, 6–4
SF	(Croatia) Iva Majoli (9)	3–6, 6–4, 5–7

	Wimbledon Championships	
1994 Wimbledon (14th Seed)
Round	Opponent	Score
1R	(Kazakhstan) Elena Likhovtseva	6–4, 6–0
2R	(Australia) Louise Field (Q)	6–4, 6–0
3R	(United States) Ginger Helgeson	6–0, 6–3
4R	(Latvia) Larisa Neiland	6–1, 3–6, 4–6

	US Open	
1994 US Open (11th Seed)
Round	Opponent	Score
1R	(Austria) Petra Ritter	6–1, 7–6
2R	(Russia) Eugenia Maniokova	6–2, 6–0
3R	(South Africa) Mariaan de Swardt (Q)	6–1, 6–3
4R	(Japan) Mana Endo	6–3, 6–0
QF	(Germany) Steffi Graf (1)	0–6, 2–6
1996 US Open
Round	Opponent	Score
1R	(Germany) Anke Huber (6)	6–1, 2–6, 6–2
2R	(South Africa) Mariaan de Swardt	6–2, 7–5
3R	(Romania) Irina Spîrlea	7–6, 7–5
4R	(United States) Lisa Raymond	6–4, 6–1
QF	(United States) Monica Seles (2)	0–6, 3–6
1998 US Open (13th Seed)
Round	Opponent	Score
1R	(United States) Sandra Cacic	6–1, 7–6^{(7–3)}
2R	(Romania) Raluca Sandu (Q)	6–0, 6–2
3R	(Austria) Barbara Schett	3–6, 6–0, 6–3
4R	(Spain) Conchita Martínez (7)	6–4, 4–6, 6–2
QF	(United States) Lindsay Davenport (2)	0–6, 4–6

== Wins over top 10 players ==
Season	1992	1993	1994	1995	1996	1997	1998	1999	2000	2001	2002	Total
Wins	2	3	2	4	2	9	2	3	4	1	1	34

#	Player	Rank	Event	Surface	Rd	Score	Coetzer Rank
1992
1.	(Argentina) Gabriela Sabatini	3	Virginia Slims of Florida, U.S.	Hard	Quarterfinal	4–6, 6–1, 6–2	61
2.	(United States) Jennifer Capriati	6	Italian Open	Clay	3R	6–1, 3–6, 6–4	31
1993
3.	(United States) Jennifer Capriati	6	Amelia Island, U.S.	Hard	2R	6–2, 1–6, 6–4	15
4.	(Spain) Arantxa Sánchez Vicario	2	Tokyo, Japan	Hard	Semifinal	6–3, 6–4	17
5.	(United States) Mary Joe Fernández	6	WTA Tour Championships	Carpet (i)	1R	6–3, 6–4	16
1994
6.	(United States) Mary Joe Fernández	7	Evert Cup, U.S.	Hard	Quarterfinal	6–2, 2–6, 7–6^{(4)}	16
7.	(Japan) Kimiko Date	6	French Open	Clay	1R	6–2, 6–1	18
1995
8.	(Germany) Steffi Graf	1	Canadian Open	Hard	2R	3–6, 6–2, 7–6^{(6)}	27
9.	(France) Mary Pierce	5	Canadian Open	Hard	Quarterfinal	6–4, 5–7, 6–0	27
10.	(Czech Republic) Jana Novotná	4	Canadian Open	Hard	Semifinal	6–4, 6–3	27
11.	(Bulgaria) Magdalena Maleeva	8	Brighton, UK	Carpet	Semifinal	6–3, 6–3	23
1996
12.	(United States) Chanda Rubin	10	Oklahoma City, U.S.	Hard	Semifinal	6–2, 2–6, 7–6^{(4)}	17
13.	(Germany) Anke Huber	5	US Open	Hard	1R	6–1, 2–6, 6–2	17
1997
14.	(Germany) Steffi Graf	1	Australian Open	Hard	4R	6–2, 7–5	14
15.	(Romania) Irina Spîrlea	10	Tokyo, Japan	Carpet	2R	6–4, 2–6, 6–4	12
16.	(Spain) Arantxa Sánchez Vicario	4	Family Circle Cup, U.S.	Clay	3R	6–2, 5–7, 6–0	15
17.	(Czech Republic) Jana Novotná	4	Amelia Island, U.S.	Clay	3R	6–2, 1–6, 6–1	14
18.	(Germany) Steffi Graf	2	German Open	Clay	Quarterfinal	6–0, 6–1	10
19.	(Spain) Conchita Martínez	7	French Open	Clay	4R	6^{(4)}–7, 6–4, 6–3	11
20.	(Germany) Steffi Graf	2	French Open	Clay	Quarterfinals	6–1, 6–4	11
21.	(Czech Republic) Jana Novotná	3	New Haven Open, U.S.	Hard	Quarterfinal	1–6, 6–3, 6–1	5
22.	(Switzerland) Martina Hingis	1	Leipzig Cup, Germany	Carpet	Semifinal	6–4, 4–6, 7–6^{(3)}	6
1998
23.	(Spain) Conchita Martínez	7	US Open	Hard	4R	6–4, 4–6, 6–2	11
24.	(Spain) Arantxa Sánchez Vicario	4	Philadelphia, U.S.	Hard	2R	6–4, 6–1	15
1999
25.	(United States) Lindsay Davenport	1	Tokyo, Japan	Carpet	Quarterfinal	2–6, 6–4, 6–3	15
26.	(United States) Monica Seles	4	Tokyo, Japan	Carpet	Semifinal	6–4, 6–2	15
27.	(France) Mary Pierce	8	Miami Open, U.S.	Hard	3R	6–1, 4–2(ret)	9
2000
28.	(Spain) Conchita Martínez	7	Key Biscayne, U.S.	Hard	3R	6–1, 6–2	20
29.	(United States) Venus Williams	3	Hamburg, Germany	Clay	Quarterfinal	6–3, 6–4	18
30.	(France) Julie Halard-Decugis	10	Hamburg, Germany	Clay	3R	6–2, 6–2	16
31.	(Germany) Anke Huber	10	New Haven, U.S.	Hard	Quarterfinal	7–6^{(3)}, 6–1	14
2001
32.	(Russia) Elena Dementieva	10	Acapulco, Mexico	Clay	Final	2–6, 6–1, 6–2	11
2002
33.	(Serbia) Jelena Dokic	5	Moscow, Russia	Carpet (i)	3R	7–6^{(3)}, 3–6, 6–1	26
2003
34.	(Slovenia) Daniela Hantuchová	5	Indian Wells, U.S.	Carpet (i)	3R	6–4, 6–4	19

== Longest winning streaks ==
=== First 8–match singles winning streak (1992) ===
#	Tournament	Category	Start date	Surface	Rd	Opponent	Rank	Score	ACR
–	Family Circle Cup, United States	Tier I	30 March 1992	Clay	3R	(Argentina) Gabriela Sabatini (1)	No. 3	5–7, 4–6	No. 35
1	Fed Cup Europe/Africa Zone, Greece	Team event	13 April 1992	Clay	-	(Luxembourg) Anne Kremer	No. NR	6–0, 6–0	No. 35
2	Fed Cup Europe/Africa Zone, Greece	Team event	13 April 1992	Clay	-	(Estonia) Helene Holter	No. 828	6–0, 6–0	No. 35
3	Fed Cup Europe/Africa Zone, Greece	Team event	13 April 1992	Clay	-	(Republic of Ireland) Gina Niland	No. 514	6–1, 6–1	No. 35
4	Fed Cup Europe/Africa Zone, Greece	Team event	13 April 1992	Clay	-	(Socialist Federal Republic of Yugoslavia) Ljudmila Pavlov	No. NR	6–3, 6–0	No. 35
5	Fed Cup Europe/Africa Zone, Greece	Team event	13 April 1992	Clay	-	(Slovenia) Barbara Mulej	No. 141	6–4, 4–6, 6–1	No. 35
6	Fed Cup Europe/Africa Zone, Greece	Team event	13 April 1992	Clay	-	(Croatia) Nadin Ercegović	No. 131	7–5, 4–6, 6–2	No. 35
7	Ilva Trophy, Italy	Tier V	27 April 1992	Clay	1R	(Italy) Cristina Salvi (WC)	No. 180	6–3, 6–2	No. 32
8	Ilva Trophy, Italy	Tier V	27 April 1992	Clay	2R	(France) Nathalie Herreman	No. 115	4–6, 6–0, 7–5	No. 32
–	Ilva Trophy, Italy	Tier V	27 April 1992	Clay	QF	(Italy) Linda Ferrando	No. 95	4–6, 2–6	No. 32

=== Second 8–match singles winning streak (1994) ===
#	Tournament	Category	Start date	Surface	Rd	Opponent	Rank	Score	ACR
–	Italian Open, Italy	Tier I	2 May 1994	Clay	2R	(Slovakia) Radka Zrubáková (Q)	No. 168	0–6, 5–7	No. 18
1	BVV Prague Open, Czech Republic	Tier IV	9 May 1994	Clay	1R	(Czech Republic) Eva Martincová	No. 122	6–3, 6–3	No. 18
2	BVV Prague Open, Czech Republic	Tier IV	9 May 1994	Clay	2R	(Slovakia) Janette Husárová	No. 93	6–2, 6–4	No. 18
3	BVV Prague Open, Czech Republic	Tier IV	9 May 1994	Clay	QF	(Austria) Barbara Schett (8)	No. 82	6–3, 6–1	No. 18
4	BVV Prague Open, Czech Republic	Tier IV	9 May 1994	Clay	SF	(Argentina) Paola Suárez (Q)	No. 154	7–5, 6–2	No. 18
5	BVV Prague Open, Czech Republic	Tier IV	9 May 1994	Clay	F	(Sweden) Åsa Carlsson	No. 84	6–1, 7–6^{(16–14)}	No. 18
6	French Open, France	Grand Slam	23 May 1994	Clay	1R	(Japan) Kimiko Date (6)	No. 6	6–2, 6–1	No. 18
7	French Open, France	Grand Slam	23 May 1994	Clay	2R	(Czech Republic) Radka Bobková	No. 77	6–4, 6–4	No. 18
8	French Open, France	Grand Slam	23 May 1994	Clay	3R	(Germany) Marketa Kochta	No. 55	6–0, 6–3	No. 18
–	French Open, France	Grand Slam	23 May 1994	Clay	4R	(France) Mary Pierce (12)	No. 12	1–6, 1–6	No. 18

=== Third 8–match singles winning streak (1997) ===
#	Tournament	Category	Start date	Surface	Rd	Opponent	Rank	Score	ACR
–	Amelia Island Championships, United States	Tier II	7 April 1997	Clay	SF	(United States) Lindsay Davenport (6)	No. 8	5–7, 2–6	No. 14
1	Budapest Grand Prix, Hungary	Tier IV	21 April 1997	Clay	1R	(Hungary) Andrea Temesvári (WC)	No. 207	7–6, 6–2	No. 12
2	Budapest Grand Prix, Hungary	Tier IV	21 April 1997	Clay	2R	(Austria) Marion Maruska	No. 89	6–0, 6–4	No. 12
3	Budapest Grand Prix, Hungary	Tier IV	21 April 1997	Clay	QF	(Germany) Elena Wagner	No. 119	6–1, 6–7, 6–2	No. 12
4	Budapest Grand Prix, Hungary	Tier IV	21 April 1997	Clay	SF	(Slovakia) Henrieta Nagyová (7)	No. 34	6–7, 6–1, 6–0	No. 12
5	Budapest Grand Prix, Hungary	Tier IV	21 April 1997	Clay	F	(Belgium) Sabine Appelmans (4)	No. 23	6–1, 6–3	No. 12
6	Croatian Bol Ladies Open, Croatia	Tier IV	28 April 1997	Clay	1R	(Austria) Melanie Schnell (LL)	No. 160	6–1, 6–2	No. 10
7	Croatian Bol Ladies Open, Croatia	Tier IV	28 April 1997	Clay	2R	(Puerto Rico) Kristina Brandi	No. 89	2–6, 6–0, 6–3	No. 10
8	Croatian Bol Ladies Open, Croatia	Tier IV	28 April 1997	Clay	QF	(France) Sarah Pitkowski	No. 60	6–4, 7–6	No. 10
–	Croatian Bol Ladies Open, Croatia	Tier IV	28 April 1997	Clay	SF	(Croatia) Mirjana Lučić (Q)	No. NR	4–6, 3–6	No. 10

=== Fourth 8–match singles winning streak (1998) ===
#	Tournament	Category	Start date	Surface	Rd	Opponent	Rank	Score	ACR
–	Lipton Championships, United States	Tier I	16 March 1998	Hard	4R	(Italy) Silvia Farina (29)	No. 31	7–6, 2–6, 1–6	No. 5
–	Family Circle Cup, United States	Tier I	30 March 1998	Clay	1R	bye			No. 4
1	Family Circle Cup, United States	Tier I	30 March 1998	Clay	2R	(Italy) Silvia Farina	No. 28	6–4, 6–3	No. 4
2	Family Circle Cup, United States	Tier I	30 March 1998	Clay	3R	(Spain) Virginia Ruano Pascual	No. 49	6–0, 6–4	No. 4
3	Family Circle Cup, United States	Tier I	30 March 1998	Clay	QF	(Germany) Andrea Glass (Q)	No. 94	4–6, 7–6 ret.	No. 4
4	Family Circle Cup, United States	Tier I	30 March 1998	Clay	SF	(United States) Lisa Raymond (15)	No. 19	6–4, 6–1	No. 4
5	Family Circle Cup, United States	Tier I	30 March 1998	Clay	F	(Romania) Irina Spîrlea (9)	No. 12	6–3, 6–4	No. 4
–	Amelia Island Championships, United States	Tier II	6 April 1998	Clay	1R	bye			No. 4
6	Amelia Island Championships, United States	Tier II	6 April 1998	Clay	2R	(Spain) Magüi Serna	No. 41	6–3, 6–3	No. 4
7	Amelia Island Championships, United States	Tier II	6 April 1998	Clay	3R	(Romania) Ruxandra Dragomir (11)	No. 22	6–4, 6–7, 6–0	No. 4
8	Amelia Island Championships, United States	Tier II	6 April 1998	Clay	QF	(United States) Tara Snyder (WC)	No. 74	6–4, 6–4	No. 4
–	Amelia Island Championships, United States	Tier II	6 April 1998	Clay	SF	(Spain) Conchita Martínez (6)	No. 9	4–6, 0–6	No. 4

Awards
Preceded by (United States) Kimberly Po	Karen Krantzcke Sportsmanship Award; 1995	Succeeded by (Indonesia) Yayuk Basuki
