= Croatia Billie Jean King Cup team =

Croatian national women's tennis team

Croatia
- Captain: Marin Bradarić
- Nations Ranking: 28 (22 September 2025)
- Colors: red & white
- First year: 1992
- Years played: 29
- Ties played (W–L): 113 (64–49)
- Years in World Group: 14 (5–12)
- Best finish: World Group QF (2002)
- Most total wins: Ana Konjuh (22–11)
- Most singles wins: Iva Majoli (15–14)
- Most doubles wins: Darija Jurak (18–8)
- Best doubles team: Jurak & Konjuh (8–4)
- Most ties played: Darija Jurak (27)
- Most years played: Iva Majoli (11); Jelena Kostanić Tošić (11)

The Croatia women's national tennis team represents Croatia in Billie Jean King Cup tennis competition and are governed by the Croatian Tennis Association. They currently compete in the Europe/Africa Zone Group I.

== History ==
Prior to 1992 see Yugoslavia Fed Cup team

Croatia competed in its first Fed Cup in 1992 and qualified for the first time in World Group in 1993. They reached the Quarterfinals in 2002.

== Current team ==
The following players were called up for the 2025 Billie Jean King Cup play-offs in November 2025.

Player	Singles WTA Rank	Doubles WTA Rank	First year played	Total Win/Loss	Singles Win/Loss	Doubles Win/Loss
Antonia Ružić	75	1485	2020	7–8	5–5	2–3
Petra Marčinko	117	493	2022	13–5	10–3	3–2
Jana Fett	197	—N/a	2019	2–6	0–6	2–0
Tara Würth	233	163	2020	5–8	1–3	4–5
Lea Bošković	311	1336	2018	8–3	7–3	1–0

== Players ==
Key
	Still active for the national team (Note: Players considered active are the ones who have been called up for the national team in the last 12 months.)
*	Still playing active tennis

Player	W–L (Total)	W–L (Singles)	W–L (Doubles)	Ties	Career	Years
Ivana Abramović	1–1	0–1	1–0	1	2004	1
Sanja Ančić	1–2	1–1	0–1	2	2006–2007	2
Ana Biškić	0–2	0–1	0–1	1	2018	1
Lea Bošković	8–3	7–3	1–0	10	2018–	3
Lucija Ćirić Bagarić *	1–3	0–0	1–3	4	2023	1
Nadin Ercegović	14–6	9–4	5–2	16	1992–1995	4
Jana Fett	3–7	0–6	3–1	9	2019–	3
Darija Jurak	19–8	1–0	18–8	27	2003–2020	10
Ana Konjuh *	22–11	12–7	10–4	23	2013–2022	6
Jelena Kostanić	19–20	12–13	7–7	21	1998–2010	11
Dora Krstulović	0–1	0–0	0–1	1	1998	1
Ivana Lisjak	2–5	0–5	2–0	4	2004–2007	3
Mirjana Lučić	14–3	12–1	2–2	9	1996–1998	3
Tena Lukas *	6–7	3–5	3–2	9	2016–2019	4
Iva Majoli	21–19	15–14	6–5	22	1993–2004	11
Sanda Mamić	2–5	1–4	1–1	6	2001–2009	3
Petra Marčinko	16–6	12–3	4–3	16	2022–	3
Petra Martić *	13–11	9–7	4–4	19	2008–2022	6
Gorana Matić	2–2	0–1	2–1	4	1992	1
Matea Mezak	4–4	1–2	3–2	6	2001–2006	4
Ani Mijačika	4–5	2–2	2–3	7	2011–2012	2
Tereza Mrdeža	5–4	1–3	4–1	7	2012–2014	3
Maja Murić	14–6	1–1	13–5	18	1992–1997	5
Silvia Njirić	1–8	1–3	0–5	7	2010–2016	3
Nika Ožegović	2–5	2–4	0–1	4	2005–2008	3
Maja Palaveršić	6–2	6–2	0–0	8	1992–1995	2
Jelena Pandžić	0–2	0–2	0–0	2	2011	1
Iva Primorac	5–1	1–0	4–1	6	2024–	2
Antonia Ružić	7–10	5–7	2–3	15	2020–	4
Karolina Šprem	9–7	6–5	3–2	9	2001–2006	6
Silvija Talaja	12–12	7–5	5–7	16	1993–2003	6
Ajla Tomljanović *	4–7	3–3	1–4	8	2010–2011	2
Donna Vekić *	16–8	13–7	3–1	23	2012–2022	7
Ana Vrljić	4–3	2–1	2–2	5	2007–2015	4
Tara Würth	5–8	1–3	4–5	12	2020–	4

== Managers ==
Name	Tenure	Ties	Won	Lost	Win %	Best Result
(Croatia) Sabrina Goleš	1992–1993	12	10	2	83.3	1993 World Group
(Croatia) Branimir Horvat	1994	1	0	1	0	1994 World Group
(Croatia) Vjeran Friščić	1995–1999	14	9	5	64.3	1999 World Group
(Croatia) Saša Hiršzon	2000	3	0	3	0	2000 World Group
(Croatia) Goran Prpić	2001–2011	27	11	16	40.7	2002 Quarterfinals
(Croatia) Iva Majoli	2012–2024	46	26	20	56.5	2022 Billie Jean King Cup Play-offs
(Croatia) Marin Bradarić	2024–present	10	8	2	80.0	2025 Billie Jean King Cup play-offs
Totals		113	64	49	56.6	

== Recent performances ==
Here is the list of all match-ups since 1992, when Croatia started competing as a separate nation.

=== 1990s ===
Year	Competition	Date	Location	Opponent	Score	Result
1992	1992 Federation Cup Europe/Africa Zone – Pool B, Pool stage	13 Apr	Athens (GRE)	Greece	2–1	Win
1992	1992 Federation Cup Europe/Africa Zone – Pool B, Pool stage	14 Apr	Athens (GRE)	Turkey	3–0	Win
1992	1992 Federation Cup Europe/Africa Zone – Pool B, Pool stage	15 Apr	Athens (GRE)	Portugal	2–0	Win
1992	1992 Federation Cup Europe/Africa Zone, Quarterfinals	16 Apr	Athens (GRE)	Ireland	3–0	Win
1992	1992 Federation Cup Europe/Africa Zone, Semifinals	17 Apr	Athens (GRE)	Latvia	2–1	Win
1992	1992 Federation Cup Europe/Africa Zone, Final	18 Apr	Athens (GRE)	South Africa	1–2	Loss
1993	1993 Federation Cup Europe/Africa Zone – Pool A, Pool stage	11 May	Nottingham (ENG)	Estonia	3–0	Win
1993	1993 Federation Cup Europe/Africa Zone – Pool A, Pool stage	12 May	Nottingham (ENG)	Turkey	3–0	Win
1993	1993 Federation Cup Europe/Africa Zone – Pool A, Pool stage	13 May	Nottingham (ENG)	Malta	3–0	Win
1993	1993 Federation Cup Europe/Africa Zone – Play-offs	15 May	Nottingham (ENG)	Russia	2–1	Win
1993	1993 Federation Cup World Group, First round	20 Jul	Frankfurt (GER)	Netherlands	0–3	Loss
1993	1993 Federation Cup World Group play-offs	22 Jul	Frankfurt (GER)	Belgium	3–2	Win
1994	1994 Federation Cup World Group, First round	19 Jul	Frankfurt (GER)	Bulgaria	1–2	Loss
1995	1995 Fed Cup Europe/Africa Zone Group I – Pool D, Pool stage	17 Apr	Murcia (ESP)	Belgium	1–2	Loss
1995	1995 Fed Cup Europe/Africa Zone Group I – Pool D, Pool stage	18 Apr	Murcia (ESP)	Israel	3–0	Win
1995	1995 Fed Cup Europe/Africa Zone Group I – Pool D, Pool stage	19 Apr	Murcia (ESP)	Romania	1–2	Loss
1996	1996 Fed Cup Europe/Africa Zone Group I – Pool C, Pool stage	22 Apr	Murcia (ESP)	Georgia	3–0	Win
1996	1996 Fed Cup Europe/Africa Zone Group I – Pool C, Pool stage	23 Apr	Murcia (ESP)	Yugoslavia	3–0	Win
1996	1996 Fed Cup Europe/Africa Zone Group I – Pool C, Pool stage	24 Apr	Murcia (ESP)	Switzerland	1–2	Loss
1996	1996 Fed Cup Europe/Africa Zone Group I – Knockout Stage, Semifinals	25 Apr	Murcia (ESP)	Romania	3–0	Win
1996	1996 Fed Cup Europe/Africa Zone Group I – Knockout Stage, Finals	26 Apr	Murcia (ESP)	Belarus	2–1	Win
1996	1996 Fed Cup World Group II play-offs	13–14 July	Viña del Mar (CHI)	Chile	5–0	Win
1997	1997 Fed Cup World Group II	1–2 March	Zagreb (CRO)	Austria	4–1	Win
1997	1997 Fed Cup World Group play-offs	12–13 July	Frankfurt (GER)	Germany	2–3	Loss
1998	1998 Fed Cup World Group II	25–26 Apr	Dubrovnik (CRO)	Japan	4–1	Win
1998	1998 Fed Cup World Group play-offs	25–26 Jul	Bol (CRO)	Netherlands	3–2	Win
1999	1999 Fed Cup World Group, 1st round	17–18 Apr	Raleigh, North Carolina (USA)	United States	0–5	Loss

=== 2000s ===
Year	Competition	Date	Location	Opponent	Score	Result
2000	2000 Fed Cup World Group, Pool A	27 Apr	Bari (ITA)	Germany	1–2	Loss
2000	2000 Fed Cup World Group, Pool A	28 Apr	Bari (ITA)	Spain	1–2	Loss
2000	2000 Fed Cup World Group, Pool A	29 Apr	Bari (ITA)	Italy	0–3	Loss
2001	2001 Fed Cup World Group play-offs, First round	28–29 Apr	Bassano del Grappa (ITA)	Italy	1–4	Loss
2001	2001 Fed Cup World Group play-offs, Second round – Bottom section	21–22 Jul	Valencia (VEN)	Venezuela	4–1	Win
2002	2002 Fed Cup World Group, First round	28–29 Apr	Bol (CRO)	Czech Republic	3–2	Win
2002	2002 Fed Cup World Group, Quarterfinals	20–21 Jul	Pörtschach (AUT)	Austria	1–4	Loss
2003	2003 Fed Cup World Group, First round	26–27 Apr	Moscow (RUS)	Russia	1–4	Loss
2003	2003 Fed Cup World Group play-offs	19–20 Jul	Varaždin (CRO)	Brazil	4–1	Win
2004	2004 Fed Cup World Group, First round	24–25 Apr	Bree (BEL)	Belgium	2–3	Loss
2004	2004 Fed Cup World Group play-offs	10–11 Jul	São Paulo (BRA)	Brazil	4–1	Win
2005	2005 Fed Cup World Group II	23–24 Apr	Phuket (THA)	Thailand	3–2	Win
2005	2005 Fed Cup World Group play-offs	9–10 Jul	Bol (CRO)	Germany	1–4	Loss
2006	2006 Fed Cup World Group II	22–23 Apr	Zagreb (CRO)	Argentina	3–2	Win
2006	2006 Fed Cup World Group play-offs	15–16 Jul	Umag (CRO)	Russia	2–3	Loss
2007	2007 Fed Cup World Group II	21–22 Apr	Fürth (GER)	Germany	1–4	Loss
2007	2007 Fed Cup World Group II play-offs	14–15 Jul	Split (CRO)	Chinese Taipei	3–2	Win
2008	2008 Fed Cup World Group II	2–3 Feb	Miki (JPN)	Japan	1–4	Loss
2008	2008 Fed Cup World Group II play-offs	26–27 Apr	Zagreb (CRO)	Serbia	2–3	Loss
2009	2009 Fed Cup Europe/Africa Zone Group I – Pool D	5 Feb	Tallinn (EST)	Estonia	1–2	Loss
2009	2009 Fed Cup Europe/Africa Zone Group I – Pool D	6 Feb	Tallinn (EST)	Bulgaria	2–1	Win
2009	2009 Fed Cup Europe/Africa Zone Group I – Play-offs (5th)	7 Feb	Tallinn (EST)	Denmark	2–0	Win

=== 2010s ===
Year	Competition	Date	Location	Opponent	Score	Result
2010	2010 Fed Cup Europe/Africa Zone Group I – Pool B	3 Feb	Lisbon (POR)	Portugal	2–1	Win
2010	2010 Fed Cup Europe/Africa Zone Group I – Pool B	4 Feb	Lisbon (POR)	Romania	1–2	Loss
2010	2010 Fed Cup Europe/Africa Zone Group I – Pool B	5 Feb	Lisbon (POR)	Switzerland	0–3	Loss
2010	2010 Fed Cup Europe/Africa Zone Group I – Play-offs (9th)	6 Feb	Lisbon (POR)	Belarus	1–2	Loss
2011	2011 Fed Cup Europe/Africa Zone Group I – Pool C	2 Feb	Eilat (ISR)	Greece	0–3	Loss
2011	2011 Fed Cup Europe/Africa Zone Group I – Pool C	3 Feb	Eilat (ISR)	Belarus	0–3	Loss
2011	2011 Fed Cup Europe/Africa Zone Group I – Pool C	4 Feb	Eilat (ISR)	Austria	3–0	Win
2011	2011 Fed Cup Europe/Africa Zone Group I – Play-offs (5th)	5 Feb	Eilat (ISR)	Great Britain	0–2	Loss
2012	2012 Fed Cup Europe/Africa Zone Group I – Pool D	1 Feb	Eilat (ISR)	Romania	1–2	Loss
2012	2012 Fed Cup Europe/Africa Zone Group I – Pool D	2 Feb	Eilat (ISR)	Poland	0–3	Loss
2012	2012 Fed Cup Europe/Africa Zone Group I – Pool D	3 Feb	Eilat (ISR)	Luxembourg	2–1	Win
2012	2012 Fed Cup Europe/Africa Zone Group I – Play-offs (9th)	5 Feb	Eilat (ISR)	Bosnia and Herzegovina	2–0	Win
2013	2013 Fed Cup Europe/Africa Zone Group I – Pool A	6 Feb	Eilat (ISR)	Austria	2–1	Win
2013	2013 Fed Cup Europe/Africa Zone Group I – Pool A	7 Feb	Eilat (ISR)	Georgia	3–0	Win
2013	2013 Fed Cup Europe/Africa Zone Group I – Pool A	8 Feb	Eilat (ISR)	Belarus	3–0	Win
2013	2013 Fed Cup Europe/Africa Zone Group I – Play-offs (promotional)	9 Feb	Eilat (ISR)	Poland	1–2	Loss
2014	2014 Fed Cup Europe/Africa Zone Group I – Pool A	4 Feb	Budapest (HUN)	Netherlands	0–3	Loss
2014	2014 Fed Cup Europe/Africa Zone Group I – Pool A	5 Feb	Budapest (HUN)	Luxembourg	3–0	Win
2014	2014 Fed Cup Europe/Africa Zone Group I – Pool A	7 Feb	Budapest (HUN)	Belgium	0–3	Loss
2014	2014 Fed Cup Europe/Africa Zone Group I – Play-offs (9th)	9 Feb	Budapest (HUN)	Turkey	2–1	Win
2015	2015 Fed Cup Europe/Africa Zone Group I – Pool D	4 Feb	Budapest (HUN)	Israel	3–0	Win
2015	2015 Fed Cup Europe/Africa Zone Group I – Pool D	5 Feb	Budapest (HUN)	Latvia	2–1	Win
2015	2015 Fed Cup Europe/Africa Zone Group I – Pool D	6 Feb	Budapest (HUN)	Belgium	2–1	Win
2015	2015 Fed Cup Europe/Africa Zone Group I – Play-offs (promotional)	7 Feb	Budapest (HUN)	Serbia	0–2	Loss
2016	2016 Fed Cup Europe/Africa Zone Group I – Pool C	3 Feb	Eilat (ISR)	Estonia	2–1	Win
2016	2016 Fed Cup Europe/Africa Zone Group I – Pool C	4 Feb	Eilat (ISR)	Turkey	2–1	Win
2016	2016 Fed Cup Europe/Africa Zone Group I – Pool C	5 Feb	Eilat (ISR)	Israel	1–2	Loss
2016	2016 Fed Cup Europe/Africa Zone Group I – Play-offs (5th)	6 Feb	Eilat (ISR)	Portugal	2–0	Win
2017	2017 Fed Cup Europe/Africa Zone Group I – Pool B	8 Feb	Tallinn (EST)	Bosnia and Herzegovina	3–0	Win
2017	2017 Fed Cup Europe/Africa Zone Group I – Pool B	10 Feb	Tallinn (EST)	Hungary	2–1	Win
2017	2017 Fed Cup Europe/Africa Zone Group I – Play-offs (promotional)	11 Feb	Tallinn (EST)	Great Britain	1–2	Loss
2018	2018 Fed Cup Europe/Africa Zone Group I – Pool C	7 Feb	Tallinn (EST)	Slovenia	2–1	Win
2018	2018 Fed Cup Europe/Africa Zone Group I – Pool C	8 Feb	Tallinn (EST)	Sweden	2–1	Win
2018	2018 Fed Cup Europe/Africa Zone Group I – Pool C	9 Feb	Tallinn (EST)	Hungary	0–3	Loss
2018	2018 Fed Cup Europe/Africa Zone Group I – Play-offs (5th)	10 Feb	Tallinn (EST)	Estonia	1–2	Loss
2019	2019 Fed Cup Europe/Africa Zone Group I – Pool B	6 Feb	Bath (UK)	Turkey	2–1	Win
2019	2019 Fed Cup Europe/Africa Zone Group I – Pool B	7 Feb	Bath (UK)	Georgia	2–1	Win
2019	2019 Fed Cup Europe/Africa Zone Group I – Pool B	8 Feb	Bath (UK)	Serbia	1–2	Loss
2019	2019 Fed Cup Europe/Africa Zone Group I – Play-offs (5th)	9 Feb	Bath (UK)	Hungary	0–2	Loss

=== 2020s ===
Year	Competition	Date	Location	Opponent	Score	Result
2020–21	2020 Billie Jean King Cup Europe/Africa Zone Group I – Pool A	5 Feb	Tallinn (EST)	Bulgaria	2–1	Win
2020–21	2020 Billie Jean King Cup Europe/Africa Zone Group I – Pool A	7 Feb	Tallinn (EST)	Ukraine	0–3	Loss
2020–21	2020 Billie Jean King Cup Europe/Africa Zone Group I – Play-offs (promotional)	8 Feb	Tallinn (EST)	Italy	0–2	Loss
2022	2022 Billie Jean King Cup Europe/Africa Zone Group I – Pool B	11 Apr	Antalya (TUR)	Sweden	3–0	Win
2022	2022 Billie Jean King Cup Europe/Africa Zone Group I – Pool B	12 Apr	Antalya (TUR)	Bulgaria	3–0	Win
2022	2022 Billie Jean King Cup Europe/Africa Zone Group I – Pool B	13 Apr	Antalya (TUR)	Slovenia	1–2	Loss
2022	2022 Billie Jean King Cup Europe/Africa Zone Group I – Pool B	14 Apr	Antalya (TUR)	Georgia	3–0	Win
2022	2022 Billie Jean King Cup Europe/Africa Zone Group I – Pool B	15 Apr	Antalya (TUR)	Austria	2–1	Win
2022	2022 Billie Jean King Cup Europe/Africa Zone Group I – Play-offs (promotional)	16 Apr	Antalya (TUR)	Serbia	2–0	Win
2022	2022 Billie Jean King Cup Play-offs	11–12 Nov	Rijeka (CRO)	Germany	1–3	Loss
2023	2023 Billie Jean King Cup Europe/Africa Zone Group I – Pool B	10 Apr	Antalya (TUR)	Denmark	1–2	Loss
2023	2023 Billie Jean King Cup Europe/Africa Zone Group I – Pool B	11 Apr	Antalya (TUR)	Bulgaria	0–3	Loss
2023	2023 Billie Jean King Cup Europe/Africa Zone Group I – Pool B	12 Apr	Antalya (TUR)	Serbia	0–3	Loss
2023	2023 Billie Jean King Cup Europe/Africa Zone Group I – Pool B	13 Apr	Antalya (TUR)	Sweden	0–3	Loss
2023	2023 Billie Jean King Cup Europe/Africa Zone Group I – Pool B	14 Apr	Antalya (TUR)	Norway	3–0	Win
2024	2024 Billie Jean King Cup Europe/Africa Zone Group II – Pool A	9 Apr	Vilnius (LTU)	Estonia	3–0	Win
2024	2024 Billie Jean King Cup Europe/Africa Zone Group II – Pool A	10 Apr	Vilnius (LTU)	North Macedonia	3–0	Win
2024	2024 Billie Jean King Cup Europe/Africa Zone Group II – Play-offs (1st to 3rd)	12 Apr	Vilnius (LTU)	Egypt	3–0	Win
2024	2024 Billie Jean King Cup Europe/Africa Zone Group II – Play-offs (1st to 3rd)	13 Apr	Vilnius (LTU)	Lithuania	2–0	Win
2025	2025 Billie Jean King Cup Europe/Africa Zone Group I – Pool D	8 Apr	Vilnius (LTU)	Austria	2–1	Win
2025	2025 Billie Jean King Cup Europe/Africa Zone Group I – Pool D	9 Apr	Vilnius (LTU)	Portugal	3–0	Win
2025	2025 Billie Jean King Cup Europe/Africa Zone Group I – Pool D	10 Apr	Vilnius (LTU)	Latvia	1–2	Loss
2025	2025 Billie Jean King Cup Europe/Africa Zone Group I – Play-offs (promotional)	12 Apr	Vilnius (LTU)	Serbia	2–1	Win
2025	2025 Billie Jean King Cup play-offs – Group D	15 Nov	Varaždin (CRO)	Colombia	2–1	Win
2025	2025 Billie Jean King Cup play-offs – Group D	16 Nov	Varaždin (CRO)	Czech Republic	1–2	Loss

== Statistics ==
Since 1992 (Last updated: Croatia – Czech Republic; 16 November 2025)

Record

- Champion: 0 times
- Runner-up: 0 times
- Lost in Semifinals: 0 times
- Lost in Quarterfinals: 1 time
- Lost in First Round: 6 times (including pool stage in 2000)
- Not in World Group: 14 times
- Total: 64–49 (56.6%)

Head-to-head record (1992–)

FC team	Pld	W	L
Argentina	1	1	0
Austria	6	5	1
Belarus	4	2	2
Belgium	5	2	3
(Bosnia and Herzegovina) Bosnia and Herzegovina	2	2	0
Brazil	2	2	0
Bulgaria	5	3	2
Chile	1	1	0
Chinese Taipei	1	1	0
Czech Republic	2	1	1
Colombia	1	1	0
Denmark	2	1	1
Egypt	1	1	0
Estonia	5	3	2
Georgia	4	4	0
Germany	5	0	5
Great Britain	2	0	2
Greece	2	1	1
Hungary	3	1	2
Ireland	1	1	0
Israel	3	2	1
Italy	3	0	3
Japan	2	1	1
Latvia	3	2	1
Lithuania	1	1	0
Luxembourg	2	2	0
Malta	1	1	0
Netherlands	3	1	2
North Macedonia	1	1	0
Norway	1	1	0
Poland	2	0	2
Portugal	4	4	0
Romania	4	1	3
Russia	3	1	2
Serbia	6	2	4
Slovenia	2	1	1
South Africa	1	0	1
Spain	1	0	1
Sweden	3	2	1
Switzerland	2	0	2
Thailand	1	1	0
Turkey	5	5	0
Ukraine	1	0	1
United States	1	0	1
Venezuela	1	1	0
Yugoslavia	1	1	0
Total (46)	113	64	49

Record against continents

Africa	Asia	Europe	North America	Oceania	South America
Egypt; South Africa	Chinese Taipei; Japan; Thailand	Austria; Belarus; Belgium; Bosnia and Herzegovina; Bulgaria; Czech Republic; Denmark; Estonia; Germany; Georgia; Great Britain; Greece; Hungary; Ireland; Israel; Italy; Latvia; Lithuania; Luxembourg; Malta; Netherlands; North Macedonia; Norway; Poland; Portugal; Romania; Russia; Serbia; Slovenia; Spain; Sweden; Switzerland; Turkey; Ukraine (Federal Republic of Yugoslavia) FR Yugoslavia	United States		Argentina; Brazil; Chile; Colombia; Venezuela
Record: 1-1 (50%)	Record: 3-1 (75%)	Record: 54-46 (54%)	Record: 0-1 (0%)	Record:	Record: 6-0 (100%)

Record by decade

- 2020–2029: 15–10 (60.0%)
- 2010–2019: 21–18 (53.8%)
- 2000–2009: 9–13 (40.9%)
- 1992–1999: 19–8 (70.4%)

Has never played against 19 countries which, at one point or another, played in the World Group: Australia, Canada, China, Dominican Republic, Ecuador, Finland, France, Hong Kong, Indonesia, Iran, Mexico, Morocco, New Zealand, Paraguay, Peru, Philippines, Slovakia, South Korea, Uruguay.

== See also ==
- Billie Jean King Cup
- Croatia Davis Cup team
- Croatia at the Hopman Cup
- Croatian Tennis Association
