= Netherlands Billie Jean King Cup team =

Dutch women's tennis team

Netherlands
- Captain: Kiki Bertens
- ITF ranking: 14 (17 November 2025)
- Colors: orange & white
- First year: 1963
- Years played: 62
- Ties played (W–L): 206 (123–83)
- Runners-up: 2 (1968, 1997)
- Most total wins: Betty Stöve (45–15)
- Most singles wins: Betty Stöve (22–5)
- Most doubles wins: Betty Stöve (23–10)
- Best doubles team: Kristie Boogert / Miriam Oremans (9–3)
- Most ties played: Miriam Oremans (39)
- Most years played: Arantxa Rus (16)

The Netherlands Billie Jean King Cup team represents the Netherlands in the Billie Jean King Cup tennis competition and are governed by the Koninklijke Nederlandse Lawn Tennis Bond.

== Current team ==
Most recent year-end rankings are used.

Name	Born	First	Last		Ties	Win/Loss			Ranks	
Name	Born	First	Year	Tie	Ties	Sin	Dou	Tot	Sin	Dou
Anouk Koevermans	2 January 2004	2024	2026	Norway	7	5–2	1–1	6–3	198	890
Suzan Lamens	5 July 1999	2022	2026	Norway	19	14–7	11–3	25–10	87	1066
Britt du Pree	8 January 2007	2026	2026	Georgia	1	0–0	1–0	1–0	548	365
Arantxa Rus	13 December 1990	2008	2024	Slovenia	30	18–18	1–5	19–23	139	137
Demi Schuurs	1 August 1993	2012	2025	Great Britain	20	0–0	14–6	14–6	–	21
Eva Vedder	23 November 1999	2024	2025	Great Britain	5	2–3	1–0	3–3	235	175
Anouck Vrancken Peeters	13 February 2003	2026	2026	Turkey	2	0–1	1–0	1–1	296	–

== History ==
The Netherlands competed in its first Fed Cup in 1963. Their best result was reaching the final in 1968, losing 3-0 to Australia, and 1997, losing 4-1 to France with Brenda Schultz-McCarthy winning her singles match against Mary Pierce.

In 1998, the team was relegated to the Europe/Africa Zone Group I, where they spent nearly all their time through 2013.

The Netherlands earned back-to-back promotions in 2014 and 2015 by defeating Japan and Australia respectively, thereby securing a spot in the 2016 Fed Cup World Group.

== Results ==
=== 1963–1969 ===
Year	Competition	Date	Location	Opponent	Score	Result
1963	World Group, 1st Round	17 June	London (GBR)	Switzerland	3–0	Won
1963	World Group, Quarterfinal	18 June	London (GBR)	United States	0–3	Lost
1964	World Group, 1st Round	1 September	Philadelphia (USA)	Austria	2–1	Won
1964	World Group, 2nd Round	2 September	Philadelphia (USA)	France	1–2	Lost
1966	World Group, 2nd Round	12 May	Turin (ITA)	South Africa	2–1	Won
1966	World Group, Quarterfinal	13 May	Turin (ITA)	Australia	1–2	Lost
1967	World Group, 2nd Round	7 June	Berlin (FRG)	Italy	0–3	Lost
1968	World Group, 1st Round	21 May	Paris (FRA)	Finland	3–0	Won
1968	World Group, 2nd Round	23 May	Paris (FRA)	Poland	2–1	Won
1968	World Group, Quarterfinal	24 May	Paris (FRA)	Bulgaria	3–0	Won
1968	World Group, Semifinal	25 May	Paris (FRA)	United States	2–1	Won
1968	World Group, Final	26 May	Paris (FRA)	Australia	0–3	Lost
1969	World Group, 1st Round	19 May	Athens (GRE)	Bulgaria	3–0	Won
1969	World Group, 2nd Round	21 May	Athens (GRE)	Indonesia	3–0	Won
1969	World Group, Quarterfinal	23 May	Athens (GRE)	Czechoslovakia	2–1	Won
1969	World Group, Semifinal	24 May	Athens (GRE)	United States	0–3	Lost

=== 1970–1979 ===
Year	Competition	Date	Location	Opponent	Score	Result
1970	World Group, 1st Round	19 May	Freiburg (FRG)	Greece	3–0	Won
1970	World Group, 2nd Round	20 May	Freiburg (FRG)	Canada	3–0	Won
1970	World Group, Quarterfinal	22 May	Freiburg (FRG)	Great Britain	1–2	Lost
1971	World Group, 1st Round	26 December 1970	Perth (AUS)	Canada	3–0	Won
1971	World Group, Quarterfinal	27 December 1970	Perth (AUS)	France	1–2	Lost
1972	World Group, 1st Round	20 March	Johannesburg (RSA)	New Zealand	2–1	Won
1972	World Group, 2nd Round	21 March	Johannesburg (RSA)	Colombia	2–1	Won
1972	World Group, Quarterfinal	23 March	Johannesburg (RSA)	United States	0–3	Lost
1973	World Group, 1st Round	1 May	Bad Homburg (FRG)	France	2–1	Won
1973	World Group, 2nd Round	2 May	Bad Homburg (FRG)	Denmark	2–0	Won
1973	World Group, Quarterfinal	4 May	Bad Homburg (FRG)	South Africa	0–3	Lost
1974	World Group, 1st Round	May	Naples (ITA)	France	1–2	Lost
1975	World Group, 1st Round	May	Aix-en-Provence (FRA)	Uruguay	2–1	Won
1975	World Group, 2nd Round	May	Aix-en-Provence (FRA)	Czechoslovakia	0–2	Lost
1976	World Group, 1st Round	August	Philadelphia (USA)	Brazil	3–0	Won
1976	World Group, 2nd Round	August	Philadelphia (USA)	Argentina	3–0	Won
1976	World Group, Quarterfinal	August	Philadelphia (USA)	Denmark	2–1	Won
1976	World Group, Semifinal	August	Philadelphia (USA)	United States	0–3	Lost
1977	World Group, 1st Round	June	Eastbourne (GBR)	Uruguay	3–0	Won
1977	World Group, 2nd Round	June	Eastbourne (GBR)	Israel	3–0	Won
1977	World Group, Quarterfinal	June	Eastbourne (GBR)	South Africa	1–2	Lost
1978	World Group, 1st Round	November	Melbourne (AUS)	Mexico	3–0	Won
1978	World Group, 2nd Round	November	Melbourne (AUS)	Chile	3–0	Won
1978	World Group, Quarterfinal	December	Melbourne (AUS)	Australia	0–3	Lost
1979	World Group, 1st Round	April	Madrid (ESP)	Argentina	3–0	Won
1979	World Group, 2nd Round	May	Madrid (ESP)	Japan	3–0	Won
1979	World Group, Quarterfinal	May	Madrid (ESP)	Australia	1–2	Lost

=== 1980–1989 ===
Year	Competition	Date	Location	Opponent	Score	Result
1980	World Group, 1st Round	May	Berlin (FRG)	Argentina	1–2	Lost
1981	World Group, 1st Round	November	Tokyo (JPN)	Hong Kong	2–1	Won
1981	World Group, 2nd Round	November	Tokyo (JPN)	Italy	2–1	Won
1981	World Group, Quarterfinal	November	Tokyo (JPN)	Australia	0–3	Lost
1982	World Group, 1st Round	July	Santa Clara (USA)	Denmark	2–1	Won
1982	World Group, 2nd Round	July	Santa Clara (USA)	Australia	0–3	Lost
1983	World Group, 1st Round	July	Zürich (SUI)	China	1–2	Lost
1984	World Group, 1st Round	July	São Paulo (BRA)	France	1–2	Lost
1985	World Group, 1st Round	October	Nagoya (JPN)	Switzerland	1–2	Lost
1986	World Group, 1st Round	July	Prague (TCH)	Canada	1–2	Lost
1987	World Group, 1st Round	July	Vancouver (CAN)	Canada	0–3	Lost
1988	World Group, 1st Round	December	Melbourne (AUS)	Spain	0–3	Lost
1989	World Group, 1st Round	October	Tokyo (JPN)	Yugoslavia	3–0	Won
1989	World Group, 2nd Round	October	Tokyo (JPN)	Spain	0–3	Lost

=== 1990–1999 ===
Year	Competition	Date	Location	Opponent	Score	Result
1990	World Group, 1st Round	July	Atlanta (USA)	Switzerland	2–1	Won
1990	World Group, 2nd Round	July	Atlanta (USA)	Germany	2–1	Won
1990	World Group, Quarterfinal	July	Atlanta (USA)	Soviet Union	0–3	Lost
1991	World Group, 1st Round	23 July	Nottingham (GBR)	United States	0–2	Lost
1991	World Group, Play-off	24 July	Nottingham (GBR)	Hungary	2–0	Won
1992	World Group, 1st Round	13 July	Frankfurt (GER)	Paraguay	2–1	Won
1992	World Group, 2nd Round	13 July	Frankfurt (GER)	Germany	1–2	Lost
1993	World Group, 1st Round	20 July	Frankfurt (GER)	Croatia	3–0	Won
1993	World Group, 2nd Round	21 July	Frankfurt (GER)	Latvia	3–0	Won
1993	World Group, Quarterfinal	23 July	Frankfurt (GER)	Spain	0–3	Lost
1994	World Group, 1st Round	19 July	Frankfurt (GER)	Belarus	2–1	Won
1994	World Group, 2nd Round	20 July	Frankfurt (GER)	South Africa	1–2	Lost
1995	World Group II, 1st Round	23 April	Västerås (SWE)	Sweden	5–0	Won
1995	World Group, Play-off	23 July	Noordwijk (NED)	Austria	1–4	Lost
1996	World Group II, 1st Round	28 April	Kampen (NED)	Australia	4–1	Won
1996	World Group, Play-off	14 July	Bratislava (SVK)	Slovakia	3–2	Won
1997	World Group, 1st Round	2 March	Haarlem (NED)	United States	3–2	Won
1997	World Group, Semifinals	13 July	Prague (CZE)	Czech Republic	3–2	Won
1997	World Group, Final	5 October	's-Hertogenbosch (NED)	France	1–4	Lost
1998	World Group, 1st Round	19 April	Kiawah Island (USA)	United States	0–5	Lost
1998	World Group, Play-off	26 July	Bol (CRO)	Croatia	2–3	Lost
1999	World Group II, 1st Round	18 April	's-Hertogenbosch (NED)	Belgium	0–5	Lost
1999	World Group II, Play-off	24 July	Amsterdam (NED)	Australia	0–2	Lost

=== 2000–2009 ===
Year	Competition	Date	Location	Opponent	Score	Result
2000	Europe/Africa Zone, Group I/A, Round Robin	16 May	Murcia (ESP)	Turkey	3–0	Won
2000	Europe/Africa Zone, Group I/A, Round Robin	17 May	Murcia (ESP)	Sweden	3–0	Won
2000	Europe/Africa Zone, Group I/A, Round Robin	18 May	Murcia (ESP)	Bulgaria	3–0	Won
2000	Europe/Africa Zone, Semifinal	20 May	Murcia (ESP)	Israel	2–1	Won
2000	Europe/Africa Zone, Final	21 May	Murcia (ESP)	Hungary	0–2	Lost
2001	Europe/Africa Zone, Group I/A, Round Robin	24 May	Murcia (ESP)	North Macedonia	3–0	Won
2001	Europe/Africa Zone, Group I/A, Round Robin	25 May	Murcia (ESP)	Poland	3–0	Won
2001	Europe/Africa Zone, Group I/A, Round Robin	26 May	Murcia (ESP)	Yugoslavia	3–0	Won
2001	Europe/Africa Zone, Promotional Play-Offs	28 May	Murcia (ESP)	Sweden	0–2	Lost
2002	Europe/Africa Zone, Group I/B, Round Robin	24 April	Antalya (TUR)	Bosnia and Herzegovina	2–1	Won
2002	Europe/Africa Zone, Group I/B, Round Robin	25 April	Antalya (TUR)	Romania	2–1	Won
2002	Europe/Africa Zone, Group I/B, Round Robin	26 April	Antalya (TUR)	Israel	1–2	Lost
2002	Europe/Africa Zone, Promotional Play-Offs	27 April	Antalya (TUR)	Luxembourg	2–1	Won
2002	World Group II, Play-off	21 July	Wollongong (AUS)	Australia	2–3	Lost
2003	Europe/Africa Zone, Group I/D, Round Robin	21 April	Estoril (POR)	Poland	1–2	Lost
2003	Europe/Africa Zone, Group I/D, Round Robin	22 April	Estoril (POR)	Hungary	1–2	Lost
2003	Europe/Africa Zone, Group I/D, Round Robin	23 April	Estoril (POR)	Ireland	2–1	Won
2003	Europe/Africa Zone, Group I/D, Round Robin	24 April	Estoril (POR)	Great Britain	2–1	Won
2003	Europe/Africa Zone, Promotional Play-Offs	26 April	Estoril (POR)	Switzerland	0–3	Lost
2004	Europe/Africa Zone, Group I/B, Round Robin	19 April	Antalya (TUR)	Israel	1–2	Lost
2004	Europe/Africa Zone, Group I/B, Round Robin	21 April	Antalya (TUR)	Ukraine	1–2	Lost
2004	Europe/Africa Zone, Group I/B, Round Robin	22 April	Antalya (TUR)	South Africa	2–1	Won
2005	Europe/Africa Zone, Group I/B, Round Robin	20 April	Antalya (TUR)	Poland	3–0	Won
2005	Europe/Africa Zone, Group I/B, Round Robin	21 April	Antalya (TUR)	Sweden	2–1	Won
2005	Europe/Africa Zone, Group I/B, Round Robin	22 April	Antalya (TUR)	Luxembourg	3–0	Won
2005	Europe/Africa Zone, Promotional Play-Offs	23 April	Antalya (TUR)	Bulgaria	0–2	Lost
2006	Europe/Africa Zone, Group I/A, Round Robin	17 April	Plovdiv (BUL)	Finland	3–0	Won
2006	Europe/Africa Zone, Group I/A, Round Robin	18 April	Plovdiv (BUL)	Slovakia	1–2	Lost
2006	Europe/Africa Zone, Group I/A, Round Robin	19 April	Plovdiv (BUL)	Luxembourg	3–0	Won
2007	Europe/Africa Zone, Group I/A, Round Robin	18 April	Plovdiv (BUL)	Romania	2–1	Won
2007	Europe/Africa Zone, Group I/A, Round Robin	19 April	Plovdiv (BUL)	Denmark	1–2	Lost
2007	Europe/Africa Zone, Group I/A, Round Robin	20 April	Plovdiv (BUL)	Switzerland	0–3	Lost
2007	Europe/Africa Zone, Relegation Play-off	21 April	Plovdiv (BUL)	Estonia	2–1	Won
2008	Europe/Africa Zone, Group I/A, Round Robin	30 January	Budapest (HUN)	Luxembourg	2–1	Won
2008	Europe/Africa Zone, Group I/A, Round Robin	31 January	Budapest (HUN)	Portugal	3–0	Won
2008	Europe/Africa Zone, Group I/A, Round Robin	1 February	Budapest (HUN)	Bulgaria	2–0	Won
2008	Europe/Africa Zone, Promotional Play-off	2 February	Budapest (HUN)	Serbia	0–2	Lost
2009	Europe/Africa Zone, Group I/A, Round Robin	4 February	Tallinn (EST)	Luxembourg	3–0	Won
2009	Europe/Africa Zone, Group I/A, Round Robin	5 February	Tallinn (EST)	Great Britain	0–3	Lost
2009	Europe/Africa Zone, Group I/A, Round Robin	6 February	Tallinn (EST)	Hungary	1–2	Lost

=== 2010–2019 ===
Year	Competition	Date	Location	Opponent	Score	Result
2010	Europe/Africa Zone, Group I/A, Round Robin	3 February	Lisbon (POR)	Bulgaria	2–1	Won
2010	Europe/Africa Zone, Group I/A, Round Robin	4 February	Lisbon (POR)	Slovenia	1–2	Lost
2010	Europe/Africa Zone, Group I/A, Round Robin	5 February	Lisbon (POR)	Israel	3–0	Won
2010	Europe/Africa Zone, 5th to 8th play-offs	6 February	Lisbon (POR)	Great Britain	2–1	Won
2011	Europe/Africa Zone, Group I/D, Round Robin	2 February	Eilat (ISR)	Romania	3–0	Won
2011	Europe/Africa Zone, Group I/D, Round Robin	3 February	Eilat (ISR)	Hungary	3–0	Won
2011	Europe/Africa Zone, Group I/D, Round Robin	4 February	Eilat (ISR)	Latvia	3–0	Won
2011	Europe/Africa Zone, Promotional Play-off	5 February	Eilat (ISR)	Switzerland	1–2	Lost
2012	Europe/Africa Zone, Group I/C, Round Robin	1 February	Eilat (ISR)	Israel	1–2	Lost
2012	Europe/Africa Zone, Group I/C, Round Robin	2 February	Eilat (ISR)	Great Britain	1–2	Lost
2012	Europe/Africa Zone, Group I/C, Round Robin	3 February	Eilat (ISR)	Portugal	1–2	Lost
2012	Europe/Africa Zone, Relegation Play-Offs	4 February	Eilat (ISR)	Estonia	2–1	Won
2013	Europe/Africa Zone, Group I/D, Round Robin	7 February	Eilat (ISR)	Bulgaria	0–3	Lost
2013	Europe/Africa Zone, Group I/D, Round Robin	8 February	Eilat (ISR)	Slovenia	3–0	Won
2013	Europe/Africa Zone, Group I/D, Round Robin	9 February	Eilat (ISR)	Luxembourg	3–0	Won
2013	Europe/Africa Zone, 5th to 8th play-offs	10 February	Eilat (ISR)	Hungary	0–2	Lost
2014	Europe/Africa Zone, Group I/A, Round Robin	4 February	Budapest (HUN)	Croatia	3–0	Won
2014	Europe/Africa Zone, Group I/A, Round Robin	5 February	Budapest (HUN)	Belgium	3–0	Won
2014	Europe/Africa Zone, Group I/A, Round Robin	7 February	Budapest (HUN)	Luxembourg	3–0	Won
2014	Europe/Africa Zone, Promotional Play-off	9 February	Budapest (HUN)	Belarus	2–0	Won
2014	World Group II, Play-off	20 April	's-Hertogenbosch (NED)	Japan	3–2	Won
2015	World Group II, 1st Round	8 February	Apeldoorn (NED)	Slovakia	4–1	Won
2015	World Group, Play-off	19 April	's-Hertogenbosch (NED)	Australia	4–1	Won
2016	World Group, 1st Round	7 February	Moscow (RUS)	Russia	3–1	Won
2016	World Group, Semifinals	17 April	Trélazé (FRA)	France	2–3	Lost
2017	World Group, 1st Round	11–12 February	Minsk (BLR)	Belarus	1–4	Lost
2017	World Group, Play-off	22–23 April	Bratislava (SVK)	Slovakia	3–2	Won
2018	World Group, 1st Round	10–11 February	Asheville (USA)	United States	1–3	Lost
2018	World Group, Play-off	21–22 April	Wollongong (AUS)	Australia	1–4	Lost
2019	World Group II, 1st Round	9–10 February	's-Hertogenbosch (NED)	Canada	0–4	Lost
2019	World Group II, Play-off	20–21 April	Osaka (JPN)	Japan	0–4	Lost

=== 2020–2029 ===
Year	Competition	Date	Location	Opponent	Score	Result
2020–21	Qualifying Round	7–8 February	The Hague (NED)	Belarus	2–3	Lost
2020–21	Play-offs	16–17 April	's-Hertogenbosch (NED)	China	3–2	Won
2022	Qualifying Round	15–16 April	's-Hertogenbosch (NED)	Spain	0–4	Lost
2022	Play-offs	11–12 November	Le Portel (FRA)	France	3–1	Lost
2023	Europe/Africa Zone, Group I/A, Round Robin	10 April	Antalya (TUR)	Latvia	3–0	Won
2023	Europe/Africa Zone, Group I/A, Round Robin	11 April	Antalya (TUR)	Turkey	2–1	Won
2023	Europe/Africa Zone, Group I/A, Round Robin	13 April	Antalya (TUR)	Egypt	3–0	Won
2023	Europe/Africa Zone, Group I/A, Round Robin	14 April	Antalya (TUR)	Hungary	0–3	Lost
2023	Europe/Africa Zone, Group I, Play-offs	15 April	Antalya (TUR)	Serbia	2–1	Won
2023	Play-offs	10–12 Nov	Vilnius (LTU)	Ukraine	1–3	Lost
2024	Europe/Africa Zone, Group I/B, Round Robin	8 April	Oeiras (POR)	Turkey	2–1	Won
2024	Europe/Africa Zone, Group I/B, Round Robin	9 April	Oeiras (POR)	Latvia	2–1	Won
2024	Europe/Africa Zone, Group I/B, Round Robin	10 April	Oeiras (POR)	Portugal	3–0	Won
2024	Europe/Africa Zone, Group I, Play-offs	11 April	Oeiras (POR)	Serbia	2–1	Won
2024	Europe/Africa Zone, Group I, Play-offs	13 April	Oeiras (POR)	Austria	2–1	Won
2024	Play-offs	15–17 Nov	Velenje (SLO)	Slovenia	3–1	Won
2025	Qualifying Round	10 April	The Hague (NED)	Germany	3–0	Won
2025	Qualifying Round	12 April	The Hague (NED)	Great Britain	1–2	Lost
2025	Play-offs	14 November	Bengaluru (IND)	Slovenia	1–2	Lost
2025	Play-offs	16 November	Bengaluru (IND)	India	3–0	Won
2026	Europe/Africa Zone, Group I/B, Round Robin	7–8 April	Oeiras (POR)	Hungary	1–2	Lost
2026	Europe/Africa Zone, Group I/B, Round Robin	8–9 April	Oeiras (POR)	Georgia	3–0	Won
2026	Europe/Africa Zone, Group I/B, Round Robin	9 April	Oeiras (POR)	Turkey	0–2	Lost
2026	Europe/Africa Zone, Group I, Play-offs	10 April	Oeiras (POR)	Norway	2–0	Won

== See also ==
- Billie Jean King Cup
- Netherlands Davis Cup team
- Netherlands at the Hopman Cup
- Royal Dutch Lawn Tennis Association
