= Barbara Collet =

French tennis player

- Country (sports): France
- Born: 13 February 1974 (age 51)
- Prize money: $21,470

Singles
- Career record: 41–33
- Career titles: 3 ITF
- Highest ranking: No. 286 (30 March 1992)

Grand Slam singles results
- French Open: 1R (1992)

Doubles
- Career record: 16–17
- Career titles: 1 ITF
- Highest ranking: No. 378 (28 October 1991)

Grand Slam doubles results
- French Open: 1R (1992)

Barbara Collet (born 13 February 1974) is a French former professional tennis player.

Collet reached a career best ranking of 286 in the world and won three ITF singles titles. She featured as a wildcard in the main draw of the 1992 French Open and was beaten in the first round by Larisa Savchenko.

== ITF finals ==
=== Singles: 5 (3–2) ===
Result	No.	Date	Tournament	Surface	Opponent	Score
Loss	1.	4 November 1990	Meknes, Morocco	Clay	(France) Olivia Gravereaux	1–6, 2–6
Win	1.	16 June 1991	Cascais, Portugal	Clay	(Sweden) Annika Narbe	6–4, 6–3
Loss	2.	23 June 1991	Aveiro, Portugal	Hard	(France) Olivia De Camaret	7–5, 4–6, 4–6
Win	2.	30 June 1991	Covilhã, Portugal	Hard	(Netherlands) Monique Kiene	6–3, 6–1
Win	3.	4 August 1991	A Coruña, Spain	Clay	(Spain) Noelia Pérez Peñate	6–3, 6–4

=== Doubles: 3 (1–2) ===
Result	No.	Date	Tournament	Surface	Partner	Opponents	Score
Loss	1.	4 November 1990	Meknes, Morocco	Clay	(France) Julie Foillard	(Republic of Ireland) Gina Niland (Republic of Ireland) Siobhán Nicholson	5–7, 3–6
Win	1.	16 June 1991	Cascais, Portugal	Clay	(Netherlands) Rieneke Kusters	(Sweden) Marie Linusson (Sweden) Annika Narbe	6–3, 3–6, 6–2
Loss	2.	28 June 1992	Reggio Emilia, Italy	Clay	(France) Alexandra Fusai	(Romania) Ruxandra Dragomir (Switzerland) Natalie Tschan	6–3, 2–6, 1–6
