= 1992 Federation Cup (tennis) =

International women's tennis competition

Details
- Duration: 21 April – 19 July
- Edition: 30th

Champion
- Winning nation: Germany

The 1992 Federation Cup was the 30th edition of the most important competition between national teams in women's tennis. Qualifying rounds were split among three regional zones for the first time, each sending teams to the main World Group tournament. Germany defeated Spain in the final, held on 19 July, giving Germany their second title and first since the German reunification.

== Qualifying rounds ==
- Nations in **bold** qualified for the World Group.

=== Americas Zone ===
Venue: Atlas Colomos T.C, Guadalajara, Mexico (outdoor clay)

Dates: April 21–25

Participating teams

- Bolivia
- Brazil
- **Chile**
- Colombia
- Costa Rica
- Cuba
- Dominican Republic
- Ecuador
- El Salvador
- Guatemala
- Jamaica
- **Mexico**
- Puerto Rico
- Trinidad and Tobago
- Uruguay
- Venezuela

=== Asia/Oceania Zone ===
Venue: National Tennis Centre, Colombo, Sri Lanka (outdoor clay)

Dates: May 4–8

Participating teams

- Chinese Taipei
- Hong Kong
- India
- Malaysia
- Philippines
- **South Korea**
- Sri Lanka
- Thailand

=== Europe/Africa Zone ===
Venue: Olympic T.C., Athens, Greece (outdoor clay)

Dates: April 13–18

Participating teams

- Congo
- Croatia
- Estonia
- Greece
- Ireland
- Latvia
- Lithuania
- Luxembourg
- Malta
- Norway
- Portugal
- Slovenia
- **South Africa**
- Tunisia
- Turkey
- Yugoslavia

== World Group ==
Venue: Waldstadion T.C., Frankfurt, Germany (outdoor clay)

Dates: July 13–19

Participating teams
Argentina	Australia	Austria	Belgium	Bulgaria	Canada	Chile	China
CIS	Czechoslovakia	Denmark	Finland	France	Germany	Great Britain	Hungary
Indonesia	Israel	Italy	Japan	Mexico	Netherlands	New Zealand	Paraguay
Poland	Romania	South Africa	South Korea	Spain	Sweden	Switzerland	United States

=== Draw ===
First Round; 13–14 July
Spain	2
Belgium	1
Canada	2
Q	South Africa	1
Argentina	3
Q	Mexico	0
Japan	2
Indonesia	1
Austria	2
Romania	1
Bulgaria	1
Australia	2
Q	South Korea	2
Italy	1
Hungary	0
Czechoslovakia	3
Germany	3
New Zealand	0
Paraguay	1
Netherlands	2
Poland	3
Israel	0
Sweden	2
Switzerland	1
CIS	2
Finland	1
France	2
China	1
Denmark	2
Q	Chile	1
Great Britain	0
United States	3

Second Round; 15 July
Spain	2
Canada	1
Argentina	2
Japan	1
Austria	1
Australia	2
Q	South Korea	0
Czechoslovakia	3
Germany	2
Netherlands	1
Poland	2
Sweden	1
CIS	0
France	3
Denmark	0
United States	3

Quarterfinals; 16–17 July
Spain	2
Argentina	1
Australia	2
Czechoslovakia	1
Germany	3
Poland	0
France	1
United States	2

Semifinals; 18 July
Spain	3
Australia	0
Germany	2
United States	1

Final; 19 July
Spain	1
Germany	2

== World Group play-offs ==
Venue: Waldstadion T.C., Frankfurt, Germany (outdoor clay)

Dates: July 16–17

The sixteen teams that lost in the World Group first round ties played off in the first round, with the eight winning moving through to the play-off round. The four nations that won their play-off tie would remain in the World Group in 1993.

First Round
Mexico	2
Indonesia	1
Belgium	1
South Africa	2
Hungary	3
Italy	0
Romania	1
Bulgaria	2

Play-off Round
Mexico	0
South Africa	3
Hungary	1
Bulgaria	2

First Round
Switzerland	3
Israel	0
Paraguay	3
New Zealand	0
Great Britain	3
Chile	0
Finland	2
China	1

Play-off Round
Switzerland	3
Paraguay	0
Great Britain	1
Finland	2
