= Carole Lucarelli =

French tennis player

- Country (sports): France
- Born: 26 November 1972 (age 53)
- Prize money: $49,498

Singles
- Career record: 87–63
- Career titles: 3 ITF
- Highest ranking: No. 175 (22 November 1993)

Grand Slam singles results
- French Open: 1R (1993, 1994)
Medal record
Women's tennis
Mediterranean Games
Silver medal – second place	1993 Languedoc-Roussillon	Doubles

Carole Lucarelli (born 26 November 1972) is a French former professional tennis player.

Lucarelli played on the professional tour in the 1990s and reached a career high ranking of 175 in the world. She twice featured in the women's singles main draw at the French Open, as a wildcard in 1993 and 1994. Carole Lucarelli is now the manager of a tobacconist's shop.

== ITF finals ==
Legend
$25,000 tournaments
$10,000 tournaments

=== Singles: 5 (3–2) ===
Outcome	No.	Date	Tournament	Surface	Opponent	Score
Winner	1.	1 March 1992	Jaffa, Israel	Clay	(Latvia) Oksana Bushevitsa	6–0, 7–5
Winner	2.	26 April 1992	Nottingham, United Kingdom	Hard	(South Africa) Janine Humphreys	6–3, 6–1
Runner-up	1.	9 August 1992	College Park, United States	Hard	(Australia) Jane Taylor	5–7, 3–6
Winner	3.	23 August 1992	Cuernavaca, Mexico	Hard	(Mexico) Lucila Becerra	6–3, 7–5
Runner-up	2.	29 November 1992	Ramat HaSharon, Israel	Hard	(Czechoslovakia) Katarína Studeníková	4–6, 2–6
