= Oksana Bushevitsa =

Latvian tennis player (born 1973)

- Country (sports): Latvia
- Born: 20 July 1973 (age 52)
- Prize money: $9,032

Singles
- Career record: 43 - 27
- Career titles: 0 WTA, 1 ITF
- Highest ranking: No. 328 (1 February 1993)

Doubles
- Career record: 6 - 12
- Highest ranking: No. 580 (24 October 1988)

Team competitions
- Fed Cup: 10–9

Oksana Bushevitsa (born 20 July 1973) is a former Latvian female tennis player.

She is a member of the Latvia Fed Cup team and has a win-loss record in the Fed Cup of 10–9.

== ITF Circuit finals ==
=== Singles (1–2) ===
$100,000 tournaments
$75,000 tournaments
$50,000 tournaments
$25,000 tournaments
$10,000 tournaments

Outcome	No.	Date	Tournament	Surface	Opponent in the final	Score
Runner-up	1.	24 February 1992	Jaffa, Israel	Clay	(France) Carole Lucarelli	0–6, 5–7
Runner-up	2.	31 October 1993	Jūrmala, Latvia	Hard	(Ukraine) Elena Tatarkova	1–6, 7–5, 4–6
Winner	3.	31 January 1994	Rungsted, Denmark	Carpet	(Germany) Syna Schmidle	2–6, 7–6, 7–5
