= Latvia Billie Jean King Cup team =

Latvian national women's tennis team

Latvia
- Captain: Adrians Žguns
- Nations Ranking: 12 ▲3 (11 February 2019)
- Highest ranking: 12 (11 February 2019)
- Colors: white & carmine red
- First year: 1992
- Years played: 27
- Ties played (W–L): 97 (48–49)
- Years in World Group: 2 (1–2)
- Best finish: World Group 2R (1993)
- Most total wins: Irina Kuzmina (19–13)
- Most singles wins: Jeļena Ostapenko (22–13)
- Most doubles wins: Diāna Marcinkēviča (10–4); Līga Dekmeijere(10–7)
- Best doubles team: Līga Dekmeijere / Irina Kuzmina (5–2)
- Most ties played: Diāna Marcinkēviča (29)
- Most years played: Irina Kuzmina(8)

The Latvia women's national tennis team represents Latvia in Billie Jean King Cup tennis competition and are governed by the Latvian Tennis Union. They currently compete in World Group II.

== History ==
Latvia competed in its first Fed Cup in 1992. Their best result was reaching the round of 16 in 1993. Prior to 1992, Latvian players represented the Soviet Union. Larisa Savchenko holds the record for most doubles win (38) in Fed Cup. She achieved this record while playing for both Latvia and the Soviet Union.

== Current team (2019) ==
- Jeļena Ostapenko
- Anastasija Sevastova
- Diāna Marcinkēviča
- Daniela Vismane
- Patrīcija Špaka

== Results ==
=== 1992–1999 ===
Year	Competition	Date	Location	Opponent	Score	Result
1992	Europe/Africa Zone, Round Robin	13–15 April	Athens (GRE)	Yugoslavia	3–0	Won
1992	Europe/Africa Zone, Round Robin	13–15 April	Athens (GRE)	Malta	3–0	Won
1992	Europe/Africa Zone, Round Robin	13–15 April	Athens (GRE)	Tunisia	3–0	Won
1992	Europe/Africa Zone, Quarterfinal	16 April	Athens (GRE)	Greece	3–0	Won
1992	Europe/Africa Zone, Semifinal	16 April	Athens (GRE)	Croatia	1–2	Lost
1993	Europe/Africa Zone, Round Robin	10–14 May	Nottingham (ENG)	Hungary	2–1	Won
1993	Europe/Africa Zone, Round Robin	10–14 May	Nottingham (ENG)	Romania	3–0	Won
1993	Europe/Africa Zone, Round Robin	10–14 May	Nottingham (ENG)	Norway	2–1	Won
1993	Europe/Africa Zone, Playoffs	15 May	Nottingham (ENG)	Hungary	2–1	Won
1993	World Group, First Round	20 July	Frankfurt (GER)	Belgium	2–1	Won
1993	World Group, Second Round	21 July	Frankfurt (GER)	Netherlands	0–3	Lost
1994	World Group, First Round	19 July	Frankfurt (GER)	Australia	1–2	Lost
1995	Europe/Africa Zone Group I, Round Robin	17–21 April	Murcia (ESP)	Belarus	1–2	Lost
1995	Europe/Africa Zone Group I, Round Robin	17–21 April	Murcia (ESP)	Switzerland	2–1	Won
1995	Europe/Africa Zone Group I, Round Robin	17–21 April	Murcia (ESP)	Finland	2–1	Won
1995	Europe/Africa Zone Group I, Semifinals	17–21 April	Murcia (ESP)	Hungary	1–2	Lost
1996	Europe/Africa Zone Group I, Round Robin	22–24 April	Murcia (ESP)	Italy	1–2	Lost
1996	Europe/Africa Zone Group I, Round Robin	22–24 April	Murcia (ESP)	Sweden	0–3	Lost
1996	Europe/Africa Zone Group I, Round Robin	22–24 April	Murcia (ESP)	Norway	3–0	Won
1997	Europe/Africa Zone Group I, Round Robin	22–26 April	Bari (ITA)	Slovenia	0–3	Lost
1997	Europe/Africa Zone Group I, Round Robin	22–26 April	Bari (ITA)	Israel	1–2	Lost
1997	Europe/Africa Zone Group I, Round Robin	22–26 April	Bari (ITA)	Georgia	3–0	Won
1998	Europe/Africa Zone Group I, Round Robin	14–18 April	Murcia (ESP)	Romania	0–3	Lost
1998	Europe/Africa Zone Group I, Round Robin	14–18 April	Murcia (ESP)	South Africa	0–3	Lost
1998	Europe/Africa Zone Group I, Round Robin	14–18 April	Murcia (ESP)	Bulgaria	2–1	Won
1999	Europe/Africa Zone Group I, Round Robin	19–23 April	Murcia (ESP)	South Africa	0–3	Lost
1999	Europe/Africa Zone Group I, Round Robin	19–23 April	Murcia (ESP)	Ukraine	1–2	Lost
1999	Europe/Africa Zone Group I, Round Robin	19–23 April	Murcia (ESP)	Denmark	2–1	Won

=== 2000–2009 ===
Year	Competition	Date	Location	Opponent	Score	Result
2000	Europe/Africa Zone Group I, Round Robin	15–21 May	Murcia (ESP)	Hungary	0–3	Lost
2000	Europe/Africa Zone Group I, Round Robin	15–21 May	Murcia (ESP)	South Africa	0–3	Lost
2000	Europe/Africa Zone Group I, Round Robin	15–21 May	Murcia (ESP)	Greece	0–3	Lost
2001	Europe/Africa Zone Group II, Round Robin	14–17 May	Belek (TUR)	Georgia	0–3	Lost
2001	Europe/Africa Zone Group II, Round Robin	14–17 May	Belek (TUR)	Ireland	2–1	Won
2001	Europe/Africa Zone Group II, Round Robin	14–17 May	Belek (TUR)	Malta	2–1	Won
2002	Europe/Africa Zone Group II, Round Robin	9–13 April	Pretoria (RSA)	South Africa	1–2	Lost
2002	Europe/Africa Zone Group II, Round Robin	9–13 April	Pretoria (RSA)	Algeria	3–0	Won
2002	Europe/Africa Zone Group II, Round Robin	9–13 April	Pretoria (RSA)	Liechtenstein	3–0	Won
2002	Europe/Africa Zone Group II, First Round	9–13 April	Pretoria (RSA)	Botswana	3–0	Won
2002	Europe/Africa Zone Group II, Final	9–13 April	Pretoria (RSA)	Denmark	0–3	Lost
2003	Europe/Africa Zone Group II, Round Robin	28 April-3 May	Estoril (POR)	Greece	1–2	Lost
2003	Europe/Africa Zone Group II, Round Robin	28 April-3 May	Estoril (POR)	Algeria	2–1	Won
2004	Europe/Africa Zone Group II, Round Robin	26 April-1 May	Marsa (MLT)	Luxembourg	1–2	Lost
2004	Europe/Africa Zone Group II, Round Robin	26 April-1 May	Marsa (MLT)	Ireland	0–3	Lost
2004	Europe/Africa Zone Group II, Round Robin	26 April-1 May	Marsa (MLT)	Georgia	2–1	Won
2004	Europe/Africa Zone Group II, Round Robin	26 April-1 May	Marsa (MLT)	Finland	2–1	Won
2005	Europe/Africa Zone Group II, Round Robin	27–30 April	Antalya (TUR)	Georgia	0–3	Lost
2005	Europe/Africa Zone Group II, Round Robin	27–30 April	Antalya (TUR)	Ireland	2–1	Won
2005	Europe/Africa Zone Group II, Round Robin	27–30 April	Antalya (TUR)	Norway	3–0	Won
2005	Europe/Africa Zone Group II, Promotion	27–30 April	Antalya (TUR)	Romania	1–2	Lost
2006	Europe/Africa Zone Group II, Round Robin	26–29 April	Antalya (TUR)	Poland	0–3	Lost
2006	Europe/Africa Zone Group II, Round Robin	26–29 April	Antalya (TUR)	Portugal	1–2	Lost
2006	Europe/Africa Zone Group II, Round Robin	26–29 April	Antalya (TUR)	Greece	1–2	Lost
2007	Europe/Africa Zone Group III, Round Robin	23–27 April	Vacoas-Phoenix (MRI)	Ireland	1–2	Lost
2007	Europe/Africa Zone Group III, Round Robin	23–27 April	Vacoas-Phoenix (MRI)	Montenegro	3–0	Won
2007	Europe/Africa Zone Group III, Round Robin	23–27 April	Vacoas-Phoenix (MRI)	Malta	3–0	Won
2007	Europe/Africa Zone Group III, Round Robin	23–27 April	Vacoas-Phoenix (MRI)	Moldova	3–0	Won
2008	Europe/Africa Zone Group III, Round Robin	22–26 April	Yerevan (ARM)	Norway	2–1	Won
2008	Europe/Africa Zone Group III, Round Robin	22–26 April	Yerevan (ARM)	Mauritius	3–0	Won
2008	Europe/Africa Zone Group III, Round Robin	22–26 April	Yerevan (ARM)	Iceland	3–0	Won
2008	Europe/Africa Zone Group III, Round Robin	22–26 April	Yerevan (ARM)	Zimbabwe	3–0	Won
2009	Europe/Africa Zone Group II, Round Robin	21–25 April	Antalya (TUR)	Portugal	2–1	Won
2009	Europe/Africa Zone Group II, Round Robin	21–25 April	Antalya (TUR)	Morocco	3–0	Won
2009	Europe/Africa Zone Group II, Promotion	21–25 April	Antalya (TUR)	Georgia	3–0	Won

=== 2010–2019 ===
Year	Competition	Date	Location	Opponent	Score	Result
2010	Europe/Africa Zone Group I, Round Robin	3–6 February	Lisbon (POR)	Sweden	1–2	Lost
2010	Europe/Africa Zone Group I, Round Robin	3–6 February	Lisbon (POR)	Hungary	1–2	Lost
2010	Europe/Africa Zone Group I, Round Robin	3–6 February	Lisbon (POR)	Denmark	1–2	Lost
2010	Europe/Africa Zone Group I, Relegation	3–6 February	Lisbon (POR)	(Bosnia and Herzegovina) Bosnia	3–0	Won
2011	Europe/Africa Zone Group I, Round Robin	2–5 February	Eilat (ISR)	Netherlands	0–3	Lost
2011	Europe/Africa Zone Group I, Round Robin	2–5 February	Eilat (ISR)	Romania	1–2	Lost
2011	Europe/Africa Zone Group I, Round Robin	2–5 February	Eilat (ISR)	Hungary	0–3	Lost
2011	Europe/Africa Zone Group I, Relegation	2–5 February	Eilat (ISR)	Bulgaria	0–2	Lost
2012	Europe/Africa Zone Group II, Round Robin	18–21 April	Cairo (EGY)	Georgia	1–2	Lost
2012	Europe/Africa Zone Group II, Round Robin	18–21 April	Cairo (EGY)	Turkey	1–2	Lost
2012	Europe/Africa Zone Group II, Round Robin	18–21 April	Cairo (EGY)	Norway	3–0	Won
2012	Europe/Africa Zone Group II, Relegation	18–21 April	Cairo (EGY)	Denmark	3–0	Won
2013	Europe/Africa Zone Group II, Round Robin	17–20 April	Ulcinj (MNE)	Tunisia	1–2	Lost
2013	Europe/Africa Zone Group II, Round Robin	17–20 April	Ulcinj (MNE)	Finland	3–0	Won
2013	Europe/Africa Zone Group II, Round Robin	17–20 April	Ulcinj (MNE)	Estonia	3–0	Won
2013	Europe/Africa Zone Group II, Promotion	17–20 April	Ulcinj (MNE)	Montenegro	2–1	Won
2014	Europe/Africa Zone Group I, Round Robin	4–9 February	Budapest (HUN)	Romania	1–2	Lost
2014	Europe/Africa Zone Group I, Round Robin	4–9 February	Budapest (HUN)	Hungary	1–2	Lost
2014	Europe/Africa Zone Group I, Round Robin	4–9 February	Budapest (HUN)	Great Britain	1–2	Lost
2014	Europe/Africa Zone Group I, Relegation	4–9 February	Budapest (HUN)	Slovenia	2–0	Won
2015	Europe/Africa Zone Group I, Round Robin	4–7 February	Budapest (HUN)	Croatia	1–2	Lost
2015	Europe/Africa Zone Group I, Round Robin	4–7 February	Budapest (HUN)	Belgium	0–3	Lost
2015	Europe/Africa Zone Group I, Round Robin	4–7 February	Budapest (HUN)	Israel	1–2	Lost
2015	Europe/Africa Zone Group I, Relegation	4–7 February	Budapest (HUN)	Austria	2–1	Won
2016	Europe/Africa Zone Group I, Round Robin	3–6 February	Eilat (ISR)	Belgium	0–3	Lost
2016	Europe/Africa Zone Group I, Round Robin	3–6 February	Eilat (ISR)	Bulgaria	1–2	Lost
2016	Europe/Africa Zone Group I, Round Robin	3–6 February	Eilat (ISR)	Hungary	2–1	Won
2017	Europe/Africa Zone Group I, Round Robin	8–11 February	Tallinn (EST)	Great Britain	0–3	Lost
2017	Europe/Africa Zone Group I, Round Robin	8–11 February	Tallinn (EST)	Turkey	2–1	Won
2017	Europe/Africa Zone Group I, Round Robin	8–11 February	Tallinn (EST)	Portugal	3–0	Won
2017	Europe/Africa Zone Group I, Placement	8–11 February	Tallinn (EST)	Hungary	0–2	Lost
2018	Europe/Africa Zone Group I, Round Robin	7–10 February	Tallinn (EST)	Poland	2–1	Won
2018	Europe/Africa Zone Group I, Round Robin	7–10 February	Tallinn (EST)	Turkey	2–1	Won
2018	Europe/Africa Zone Group I, Round Robin	7–10 February	Tallinn (EST)	Austria	3–0	Won
2018	Europe/Africa Zone Group I, Promotion	7–10 February	Tallinn (EST)	Serbia	2–1	Won
2018	World Group II Play-off	21–22 April	Khanty-Mansiysk (RUS)	Russia	3–2	Won
2019	World Group II	9–10 February	Riga (LAT)	Slovakia	4–0	Won
2019	World Group Play-off	19–20 April	Riga (LAT)	Germany	1–3	Lost
2020–21	Finals Qualifying Round	7–8 February	Everett (United States)	United States	2–3	Lost
2020–21	Qualifying Round Play-off	16–17 April	Jūrmala (LAT)	India	3–1	Won
2022	Finals Qualifying Round	15–16 April	Vancouver (CAN)	Canada	0–4	Lost
2022	Qualifying Round Play-off	11–12 November	Schwechat (AUT)	Austria	2–3	Lost

== See also ==
- Billie Jean King Cup
- Latvia Davis Cup team
