= Tina Vukasovič =

Slovenian tennis player

- Country (sports): Yugoslavia; Slovenia
- Born: 9 June 1975 (age 50) Ptuj, Slovenia
- Prize money: $12,834

Singles
- Career record: 49–51
- Highest ranking: No. 478 (8 Mar 1993)

Doubles
- Career record: 31–30
- Career titles: 3 ITF
- Highest ranking: No. 277 (23 Aug 1993)

Tina Vukasovič (born 9 June 1975) is a Slovenian former professional tennis player. Since retiring she has worked in academia as a specialist in the field of marketing and holds a PhD from the University of Primorska.

Born in Ptuj, Vukasovič was a Slovenian national singles champion. She played Federation Cup tennis in 1992 and 1993, which were Slovenia's first two seasons in the competition, winning all three singles rubbers and two of her three doubles rubbers. While competing on the professional tour in the 1990s she reached a career high singles ranking of 478 in the world. She won three doubles titles on the ITF circuit and had a best doubles ranking of 277.

Vukasovič's younger sister Nena was also a professional tennis player.

== ITF finals ==
=== Singles: 1 (0–1) ===
Result	No.	Date	Tournament	Surface	Opponent	Score
Loss	1.	Mar 1992	ITF Santander, Spain	Clay	(Spain) Eva Jiménez	2–6, 2–6

=== Doubles: 5 (3–2) ===
Result	No.	Date	Tournament	Surface	Partner	Opponents	Score
Win	1.	Aug 1992	ITF La Spezia, Italy	Clay	(Czechoslovakia) Květa Peschke	(Italy) Marzia Grossi (Italy) Laura Lapi	7–5, 2–6, 6–2
Win	2.	Jun 1993	ITF Murska Sobota, Slovenia	Clay	(Croatia) Ivona Horvat	(Australia) Tonia Bayley (Germany) Maja Wittke	6–2, 6–3
Win	3.	Jun 1993	ITF Zagreb, Croatia	Clay	(Croatia) Ivona Horvat	(Bulgaria) Svetlana Krivencheva (Belgium) Vanessa Matthys	7–5, 4–6, 6–2
Loss	1.	Jul 1993	ITF Supetar, Croatia	Clay	(Croatia) Ivona Horvat	(Poland) Katarzyna Malec (Poland) Aleksandra Olsza	5–7, 6–7^{(5–7)}
Loss	2.	Oct 1993	ITF Makarska, Croatia	Clay	(Croatia) Ivona Horvat	(Czech Republic) Helena Vildová (Poland) Aleksandra Olsza	6–0, 6–7^{(5–7)}, 3–6

== See also ==
- List of Slovenia Fed Cup team representatives
