= Barbara Mulej =

Slovenian tennis player

- Country (sports): Yugoslavia; Slovenia
- Residence: Naklo, Slovenia
- Born: 29 May 1974 (age 51) Kranj, Slovenia
- Turned pro: 1988
- Retired: 2000
- Plays: Right-handed (two-handed backhand)
- Prize money: $124,996

Singles
- Career record: 172–80
- Career titles: 11 ITF
- Highest ranking: No. 111 (13 June 1994)

Grand Slam singles results
- Australian Open: 1R (1992), (1997)
- French Open: Q2 (1995)
- US Open: Q2 (1999)

Doubles
- Career record: 10–17
- Career titles: 1 ITF
- Highest ranking: No. 474 (4 February 1991)

Team competitions
- Fed Cup: 19-8

Barbara Mulej (born 29 May 1974) is a Slovenian former professional tennis player.

Mulej won eleven singles titles and one doubles title on the ITF Circuit in her career. On 13 June 1994, she reached her best singles ranking of world No. 111. On 2 February 1991, she peaked at No. 474 in the doubles rankings.

Playing for Slovenia Fed Cup team, Mulej has accumulated a win–loss record of 19–8.

== ITF finals ==
=== Singles: 17 (11–6) ===
$100,000 tournaments
$75,000 tournaments
$50,000 tournaments
$25,000 tournaments
$10,000 tournaments

Result	No.	Date	Tournament	Surface	Opponent	Score
Win	1.	2 October 1989	ITF Šibenik, Yugoslavia	Clay	(Czech Republic) Jitka Dubcová	6–2, 7–5
Win	2.	9 October 1989	ITF Bol, Yugoslavia	Clay	(Netherlands) Heleen van den Berg	3–6, 6–3, 7–6
Win	3.	9 July 1990	ITF Subiaco, Italy	Clay	(United States) Jolene Watanabe	6–3, 6–1
Win	4.	16 July 1990	Schwarzach, Austria	Clay	(Austria) Birgit Arming	7–5, 6–3
Win	5.	1 October 1990	Šibenik, Yugoslavia	Clay	(Romania) Ruxandra Dragomir	7–6, 6–4
Win	6.	8 October 1990	Bol, Yugoslavia	Clay	(Romania) Andreea Ehritt-Vanc	6–4, 6–0
Win	7.	22 July 1991	Schwarzach, Austria	Clay	(Austria) Heidi Sprung	6–2, 6–1
Win	8.	26 August 1991	Klagenfurt, Austria	Clay	(Germany) Heike Rusch	2–6, 7–6, 6–3
Loss	9.	28 October 1991	Madeira, Portugal	Hard	(Germany) Meike Babel	0–6, 2–6
Win	10.	27 July 1992	Rheda-Wiedenbrück, Germany	Clay	(Russia) Elena Makarova	7–5, 6–3
Loss	11.	26 April 1993	Porto, Portugal	Clay	(Belgium) Sabine Appelmans	6–2, 6–7, 5–7
Loss	12.	12 July 1993	Darmstadt, Germany	Clay	(Germany) Petra Begerow	0–6, 3–6
Loss	13.	15 May 1994	Budapest, Hungary	Clay	(Hungary) Andrea Temesvári	4–6, 1–6
Loss	14.	6 August 1995	Budapest, Hungary	Clay	(Serbia and Montenegro) Tatjana Ječmenica	3–6, 2–6
Win	15.	26 May 1996	Novi Sad, Yugoslavia	Clay	(Austria) Barbara Schwartz	7–5, 4–6, 6–4
Loss	16.	16 June 1996	Salzburg, Austria	Clay	(Monaco) Emmanuelle Gagliardi	4–6, 1–6
Win	17.	5 August 1996	ITF Budapest, Hungary	Clay	(Spain) Ana Alcázar	2–6, 6–4, 6–1

=== Doubles: 1 (1-0) ===
Result	No.	Date	Tournament	Surface	Partner	Opponents	Score
Win	1.	9 July 1990	ITF Subiaco, Italy	Clay	(United States) Kylie Johnson	(Hungary) Virág Csurgó (Hungary) Nóra Köves	7–6, 6–0

Sporting positions
Preceded by (Soviet Union) Elena Likhovtseva	Orange Bowl Girls' Singles Champion; Category: 18 and under 1992	Succeeded by (Spain) Ángeles Montolio
