= Gina Niland =

Irish tennis player

- Full name: Gina Niland Craig
- Country (sports): Ireland
- Born: 22 September 1972 (age 52); Dublin, Ireland
- Prize money: $14,178

Singles
- Highest ranking: No. 470 (6 July 1992)

Doubles
- Career titles: 2 ITF
- Highest ranking: No. 436 (8 April 1991)

Gina Niland Craig (born 22 September 1972) is an Irish former professional tennis player.

== Biography ==
Niland, a right-handed player raised in Limerick, was an Irish number one and a five-time winner of the Irish Close Championship singles title. She had a 12-year Fed Cup career for Ireland, appearing in a record 42 ties. With 34 overall match wins, she is Ireland's most successful Fed Cup player. Competing on the international tennis circuit in the 1990s, Niland reached a best singles ranking of 470 in the world.

Her brother, Conor Niland, was also a professional tennis player.

== ITF finals ==
=== Singles (0-2) ===
| Result | No. | Date | Tournament | Surface | Opponent | Score |
|---|---|---|---|---|---|---|
| Loss | 1. | 2 December 1990 | Bachdjerrah, Algeria | Clay | (Netherlands) Eva Haslinghuis | 0–6, 6–7 |
| Loss | 2. | 8 March 1992 | Ramat HaSharon, Israel | Hard | (Bulgaria) Galia Angelova | 4–6, 5–7 |

=== Doubles (2-1) ===
| Result | No. | Date | Tournament | Surface | Partner | Opponents | Score |
|---|---|---|---|---|---|---|---|
| Win | 1. | 4 November 1990 | Meknes, Morocco | Clay | (Republic of Ireland) Siobhán Nicholson | (France) Barbara Collet (France) Julie Foillard | 7–5, 6–3 |
| Loss | 2. | 11 May 1992 | Dublin, Ireland | Hard (i) | (Republic of Ireland) Siobhán Nicholson | (United Kingdom) Lucie Ahl (United Kingdom) Julie Salmon | 5–7, 5–7 |
| Win | 2. | 13 May 1996 | Tortosa, Spain | Clay | (Portugal) Ana Gaspar | (Spain) Yolanda Clemot (Spain) Ana Salas Lozano | 6–4, 6–2 |
