= Congo Billie Jean King Cup team =

Congolese women's tennis team

The Congo Billie Jean King Cup team represents the Republic of the Congo in Billie Jean King Cup tennis competition and are governed by the Fédération Congolaise de Tennis. They have not competed since 1992.

== History ==
Congo competed in its first (and thus far, only) Fed Cup in 1992, losing both of its ties.

== See also ==
- Billie Jean King Cup
- Congo Davis Cup team
