= Ljudmila Pavlov =

Serbian tennis player

- Country (sports): Yugoslavia
- Born: 30 June 1974 (age 51)
- Plays: Right-handed

Singles
- Career record: 2–5 (Federation Cup)
- Highest ranking: No. 790 (22 Apr 1991)

Doubles
- Career record: 2–3 (Federation Cup)
- Highest ranking: No. 671 (22 Jul 1991)

Ljudmila Pavlov (born 30 June 1974) is a Serbian former professional tennis player.

== Yugoslavia ==
Active during the 1990s, Pavlov is a native of Novi Sad and developed an interest in tennis as there was a club near the radio station her parents worked at. She was a contemporary of Monica Seles, who is the same age and also grew up with her in Novi Sad. It was an injury to Seles that gave Pavlov a Federation Cup debut for Yugoslavia in 1991.

== College tennis ==
Pavlov played collegiate tennis for Northwestern State University in Louisiana. In 1994 she became the first player from Northwestern State to earn a national collegiate singles ranking and she was named Southland Conference player of the year. Plagued by shoulder problems for much of the remainder of her collegiate career, she graduated from Northwestern State with honours in 1997.
