= Yugoslavia Fed Cup team =

Yugoslavia
- First year: 1969
- Years played: 28
- Ties played (W–L): 87 (44–43)
- Years in World Group: 17 (12–17)
- Best finish: World Group SF (1984)
- Most total wins: Sabrina Goleš (30–12); Dragana Zarić (30–15)
- Most singles wins: Dragana Zarić (17–7)
- Most doubles wins: Sabrina Goleš (15–5)
- Best doubles team: Katarina Mišić / Dragana Zarić (6–0); Sabrina Goleš / Renata Šašak (6-3)
- Most ties played: Dragana Zarić (31)
- Most years played: Mima Jaušovec (11)

The Yugoslavia Fed Cup team represented SFR Yugoslavia in Fed Cup tennis competition and was governed by the Yugoslav Tennis Association. With the dissolution of Yugoslavia, the team no longer exists.

== History ==
Yugoslavia competed in its first Fed Cup in 1969 against United States in Greece; and lost 3-0. It reached the semifinals in 1984, with Sabrina Goleš, Mima Jaušovec, and Renata Šašak, in the team.

== Successors ==
- Croatia (1992-)
- Slovenia (1992-)
- Federal Republic of Yugoslavia (1995-2003) / Serbia and Montenegro (2004-2006)
  - Serbia (2007-)
  - Montenegro (2007-)
- North Macedonia (1995-)
- Bosnia and Herzegovina (1997-)

== See also ==
- Billie Jean King Cup
- Yugoslavia Davis Cup team
