= South Africa Billie Jean King Cup team =

Tennis team

South Africa
- Captain: Earl Grainger
- ITF ranking: 43 ▼1 (16 November 2015)
- First year: 1963
- Years played: 39
- Ties played (W–L): 132 (82–50)
- Years in World Group: 20 (26–19)
- Titles: 1 (1972)
- Runners-up: 1 (1973)
- Most total wins: Natalie Grandin (33–18)
- Most singles wins: Amanda Coetzer (25–9)
- Most doubles wins: Natalie Grandin (18–5)
- Best doubles team: Linky Boshoff / Ilana Kloss (8–1)
- Most ties played: Natalie Grandin (36)
- Most years played: Natalie Grandin (10)

The South Africa Billie Jean King Cup team represents South Africa in Billie Jean King Cup tennis competition and are governed by the South African Tennis Association. They currently compete in the Europe/Africa Zone of Group II.

== History ==
South Africa competed in its first Fed Cup in 1963. They won the Cup in 1972 with a team consisting of Patricia Walkden and Brenda Kirk, defeating Great Britain in the final.

== Current team (2023) ==
- Mari-Louise van Zyl
- Naledi Manyube
- Suzanie Pretorius
- Isabella Kruger

== See also ==
- Billie Jean King Cup
- South Africa Davis Cup team
- South Africa at the Hopman Cup
