= Slovenia Billie Jean King Cup team =

Slovenian women's tennis team

Slovenia
- Captain: Andrej Krasevec
- Nations Ranking: 18 ▲16 (17 April 2023)
- Colors: white, light blue and green
- First year: 1992
- Years played: 30
- Ties played (W–L): 112 (64–48)
- Years in World Group: 6 (3-4)
- Best finish: World Group QF (2003)
- Most total wins: Tina Križan (42–30)
- Most singles wins: Katarina Srebotnik (19–12)
- Most doubles wins: Tina Križan (25–19)
- Best doubles team: Tina Križan / Katarina Srebotnik (11–5)
- Most ties played: Tina Križan (46)
- Most years played: Tina Križan (12)

The Slovenia Billie Jean King Cup team represents Slovenia in the Billie Jean King Cup tennis competition and are governed by the Slovene Tennis Association.

== History ==
Slovenia competed in its first Fed Cup in 1992. Its best result was reaching the quarterfinals in 2003. Before 1992, Slovenian players represented Yugoslavia. In November 2022, the team made Billie Jean King Cup Play-offs stage for the first time since the introduction of Billie Jean King Cup. It defeated China with a 3-1 score and secured a place in 2023 Billie Jean King Cup qualifying round. In April 2023, after a huge turnaround, it beat Romania with a 3-2 score and qualified for the 2023 Billie Jean King Cup Finals for the first time in the team's history.

== Current team (2023) ==
- Tamara Zidanšek
- Kaja Juvan
- Nina Potocnik
- Pia Lovrič
- Ela Nala Milić

== See also ==
- Billie Jean King Cup
- Slovenia Davis Cup team
