= 1996 Fed Cup Europe/Africa Zone =

Subsection of tennis competition

The Europe/Africa Zone was one of three zones of regional competition in the 1996 Fed Cup.

== Group I ==
- Venue: La Manga Club, Murcia, Spain (outdoor clay)
- Date: 22–24 April

The sixteen teams were divided into four pools of four teams. The top teams of each pool play-off in a two-round knockout stage to decide which nation progresses to World Group II play-offs. Nations finishing in the bottom place in each pool were relegated to Europe/Africa Zone Group II for 1997.

=== Pools ===
| | Pool A | RUS | BLR | SLO | GBR |
| 1 | Russia (2–1) | | 1–2 | 3–0 | 3–0 |
| 2 | Belarus (2–1) | 2–1 | | 0–3 | 2–1 |
| 3 | Slovenia (1–2) | 0–3 | 3–0 | | 1–2 |
| 4 | Great Britain (1–2) | 0–3 | 1–2 | 2–1 | |

| | Pool B | ITA | SWE | LAT | NOR |
| 1 | Italy (3–0) | | 3–0 | 2–1 | 3–0 |
| 2 | Sweden (2–1) | 0–3 | | 3–0 | 3–0 |
| 3 | Latvia (1–2) | 1–2 | 0–3 | | 3–0 |
| 4 | Norway (0–3) | 0–3 | 0–3 | 0–3 | |

| | Pool C | SUI | CRO | GEO | YUG |
| 1 | Switzerland (3–0) | | 2–1 | 3–0 | 3–0 |
| 2 | Croatia (2–1) | 1–2 | | 3–0 | 3–0 |
| 3 | Georgia (1–2) | 0–3 | 0–3 | | 2–1 |
| 4 | Yugoslavia (0–3) | 0–3 | 0–3 | 1–2 | |

| | Pool D | ROU | HUN | GRE | POR |
| 1 | Romania (3–0) | | 2–1 | 2–1 | 3–0 |
| 2 | Hungary (2–1) | 1–2 | | 2–1 | 3–0 |
| 3 | Greece (1–2) | 1–2 | 1–2 | | 2–1 |
| 4 | Portugal (0–3) | 0–3 | 0–3 | 1–2 | |

=== Knockout stage ===
Semifinals
Russia | 3
Sweden | 0
Hungary | 1
Switzerland | 2
Italy | 0
Belarus | 3
Croatia | 3
Romania | 0

Finals
Russia | 1
Switzerland | 2
Belarus | 1
Croatia | 2

- Switzerland and Croatia advanced to World Group II Play-offs.
- Great Britain, Norway, Yugoslavia and Portugal relegated to Group II in 1997.

== Group II ==
- Venue: Ramat HaSharon, Israel (outdoor hard)
- Date: 25–30 March

The nineteen teams were divided into three pools of five and one pool of four. The top two teams from each pool then moved on to the play-off stage of the competition. The four teams that won one match from the play-off stage would advance to Group I for 1997.

=== Pools ===
| | Pool A | POL | LTU | BOT | ETH |
| 1 | Poland (3–0) | | 3–0 | 3–0 | 3–0 |
| 2 | Lithuania (2–1) | 0–3 | | 3–0 | 3–0 |
| 3 | Botswana (1–2) | 0–3 | 0–3 | | 2–1 |
| 4 | Ethiopia (0–3) | 0–3 | 0–3 | 1–2 | |

| | Pool B | FIN | TUR | TUN | LIE | CYP |
| 1 | Finland (4–0) | | 3–0 | 2–1 | 3–0 | 3–0 |
| 2 | Turkey (3–1) | 0–3 | | 3–0 | 3–0 | 3–0 |
| 3 | Tunisia (2–2) | 1–2 | 0–3 | | 3–0 | 3–0 |
| 4 | Liechtenstein (1–3) | 0–3 | 0–3 | 0–3 | | 2–1 |
| 5 | Cyprus (0–4) | 0–3 | 0–3 | 0–3 | 1–2 | |

| | Pool C | ISR | LUX | EST | ZIM | MKD |
| 1 | Israel (4–0) | | 2–1 | 3–0 | 3–0 | 3–0 |
| 2 | Luxembourg (3–1) | 1–2 | | 2–1 | 2–1 | 2–1 |
| 3 | Estonia (2–2) | 0–3 | 1–2 | | 3–0 | 2–1 |
| 4 | Zimbabwe (1–3) | 0–3 | 1–2 | 0–3 | | 3–0 |
| 5 | Macedonia (0–4) | 0–3 | 1–2 | 1–2 | 0–3 | |

| | Pool D | UKR | DEN | IRL | MLT | ISL |
| 1 | Ukraine (4–0) | | 3–0 | 2–1 | 3–0 | 3–0 |
| 2 | Denmark (3–1) | 0–3 | | 2–1 | 3–0 | 3–0 |
| 3 | Ireland (2–2) | 1–2 | 1–2 | | 3–0 | 3–0 |
| 4 | Malta (1–3) | 0–3 | 0–3 | 0–3 | | 3–0 |
| 5 | Iceland (0–4) | 0–3 | 0–3 | 0–3 | 0–3 | |

=== Play-offs ===
| Winning team | Score | Losing team |
|---|---|---|
| Poland | 2–1 | Denmark |
| Finland | 2–1 | Luxembourg |
| Israel | 3–0 | Lithuania |
| Ukraine | 3–0 | Turkey |

- Poland, Finland, Israel and Ukraine promoted to Europe/Africa Group I in 1997.

== See also ==
- Fed Cup structure
