= 1995 Fed Cup Europe/Africa Zone Group I – Pool C =

International tennis competition

Group C of the 1995 Fed Cup Europe/Africa Zone Group I was one of four pools in the Europe/Africa Zone Group I of the 1995 Fed Cup. Four teams competed in a round robin competition, with the top two teams advancing to the knockout stage and the bottom team being relegated down to Group II for 1996.

	(Belarus) BLR	(Latvia) LAT	(Switzerland) SUI	(Finland) FIN	RR; W–L	Set; W–L	Game; W–L	Standings
Belarus		2–1	2–1	2–1	3–0	14–7	110–83	1
Latvia	1–2		2–1	2–1	2–1	10–10	89–87	2
Switzerland	1–2	1–2		3–0	1–2	12–9	111–92	3
Finland	1–2	1–2	0–3		0–3	5–15	72–120	4

== Belarus vs. Finland ==
Belarus
2
La Manga Club, Murcia, Spain
17 April 1995
Clay (outdoors)

Finland
1

			1	2	3
1	(Belarus) (Finland)	Tatiana Ignatieva; Petra Thorén	5; 7	6; 3	4; 6
2	(Belarus) (Finland)	Natasha Zvereva; Nanne Dahlman	7^{7} 6^{5}	6; 2
3	(Belarus) (Finland)	Tatiana Ignatieva / Natasha Zvereva; Nanne Dahlman / Petra Thorén	6; 3	6; 1

== Latvia vs. Switzerland ==
Latvia
2
La Manga Club, Murcia, Spain
17 April 1995
Clay (outdoors)

Switzerland
1

			1	2	3
1	(Latvia) (Switzerland)	Oksana Bushevitsa; Joana Manta	6; 1	6; 1
2	(Latvia) (Switzerland)	Larisa Neiland; Martina Hingis	1; 6	2; 6
3	(Latvia) (Switzerland)	Agnese Blumberga / Larisa Neiland; Geraldine Dondit / Martina Hingis	7; 5	5; 7	7; 5

== Belarus vs. Latvia ==
Belarus
2
La Manga Club, Murcia, Spain
18 April 1995
Clay (outdoors)

Latvia
1

			1	2	3
1	(Belarus) (Latvia)	Tatiana Ignatieva; Oksana Bushevitsa	6; 2	7; 5
2	(Belarus) (Latvia)	Natasha Zvereva; Agnese Blumberga	6; 0	6; 0
3	(Belarus) (Latvia)	Marina Stets / Vera Zhukovets; Agnese Blumberga / Oksana Bushevitsa	4; 6	6; 3	5; 7

== Switzerland vs. Finland ==
Switzerland
3
La Manga Club, Murcia, Spain
19 April 1995
Clay (outdoors)

Finland
0

			1	2	3
1	(Switzerland) (Finland)	Geraldine Dondit; Hanna-Katri Aalto	6; 3	6^{6} 7^{8}	11; 9
2	(Switzerland) (Finland)	Martina Hingis; Nanne Dahlman	6; 1	7^{7} 6^{3}
3	(Switzerland) (Finland)	Martina Hingis / Joana Manta; Hanna-Katri Aalto / Nanne Dahlman	6; 1	6; 1

== Belarus vs. Switzerland ==
Belarus
2
La Manga Club, Murcia, Spain
19 April 1995
Clay (outdoors)

Switzerland
1

			1	2	3
1	(Belarus) (Switzerland)	Tatiana Ignatieva; Geraldine Dondit	6; 3	7; 5
2	(Belarus) (Switzerland)	Natasha Zvereva; Martina Hingis	6; 3	3; 6	6; 3
3	(Belarus) (Switzerland)	Marina Stets / Vera Zhukovets; Martina Hingis / Joana Manta	1; 6	1; 6

== Latvia vs. Finland ==
Latvia
2
La Manga Club, Murcia, Spain
19 April 1995
Clay (outdoors)

Finland
1

			1	2	3
1	(Latvia) (Finland)	Oksana Bushevitsa; Petra Thorén	4; 6	4; 6
2	(Latvia) (Finland)	Larisa Neiland; Nanne Dahlman	6; 0	6; 1
3	(Latvia) (Finland)	Agnese Blumberga / Larisa Neiland; Nanne Dahlman / Petra Thorén	6; 1	6; 2

- Finland placed last in the pool, and thus was relegated to Group II in 1996, where they achieved advancement back into Group I for 1997.

== See also ==
- Fed Cup structure
