= 1995 Fed Cup Europe/Africa Zone Group I – Pool B =

International tennis competition

Group B of the 1995 Fed Cup Europe/Africa Zone Group I was one of four pools in the Europe/Africa Zone Group I of the 1995 Fed Cup. Four teams competed in a round robin competition, with the top two teams advancing to the knockout stage and the bottom team being relegated down to Group II for 1996.

	(Hungary) HUN	(Russia) RUS	(Georgia (country)) GEO	(Ukraine) UKR	RR; W–L	Set; W–L	Game; W–L	Standings
Hungary		3–0	w/o	3–0	2–0	12–1	79–38	1
Russia	0–3		3–0	2–1	2–1	12–11	105–110	2
Georgia	w/o	0–3		1–2	0–2	3–10	39–66	3
Ukraine	0–3	1–2	2–1		1–2	8–13	85–104	4

== Russia vs. Ukraine ==
Russia
2
La Manga Club, Murcia, Spain
17 April 1995
Clay (outdoors)

Ukraine
1

			1	2	3
1	(Russia) (Ukraine)	Elena Makarova; Talina Beiko	6; 4	4; 6	8; 6
2	(Russia) (Ukraine)	Elena Likhovtseva; Olga Lugina	7; 5	3; 6	6; 8
3	(Russia) (Ukraine)	Elena Makarova / Eugenia Maniokova; Talina Beiko / Olga Lugina	4; 6	6; 2	6; 3

== Hungary vs. Russia ==
Hungary
3
La Manga Club, Murcia, Spain
18 April 1995
Clay (outdoors)

Russia
0

			1	2	3
1	(Hungary) (Russia)	Petra Mandula; Elena Makarova	6; 4	6; 1
2	(Hungary) (Russia)	Andrea Temesvári; Elena Likhovtseva	6; 4	6; 1
3	(Hungary) (Russia)	Petra Mandula / Andrea Temesvári; Elena Likhovtseva / Eugenia Maniokova	7; 5	6^{2} 7^{7}	6; 4

== Georgia vs. Ukraine ==
Georgia
1
La Manga Club, Murcia, Spain
18 April 1995
Clay (outdoors)

Ukraine
2

			1	2	3
1	(Georgia (country)) (Ukraine)	Victoria Bakhtadze; Talina Beiko	0; 6	1; 6
2	(Georgia (country)) (Ukraine)	Nino Louarsabishvili; Olga Lugina	6; 3	6; 0
3	(Georgia (country)) (Ukraine)	Victoria Bakhtadze / Nino Louarsabishvili; Talina Beiko / Olga Lugina	2; 6	3; 6

== Hungary vs. Ukraine ==
Hungary
3
La Manga Club, Murcia, Spain
19 April 1995
Clay (outdoors)

Ukraine
0

			1	2	3
1	(Hungary) (Ukraine)	Petra Mandula; Talina Beiko	6; 2	6; 1
2	(Hungary) (Ukraine)	Andrea Temesvári; Olga Lugina	6; 2	6; 1
3	(Hungary) (Ukraine)	Petra Mandula / Andrea Temesvári; Talina Beiko / Olga Lugina	6; 3	6; 3

== Russia vs. Georgia ==
Russia
3
La Manga Club, Murcia, Spain
19 April 1995
Clay (outdoors)

Georgia
0

			1	2	3
1	(Russia) (Georgia (country))	Olga Ivanova; Victoria Bakhtadze	6; 3	6; 0
2	(Russia) (Georgia (country))	Eugenia Maniokova; Nino Louarsabishvili	2; 6	6; 2	6; 1
3	(Russia) (Georgia (country))	Olga Ivanova / Elena Likhovtseva; Victoria Bakhtadze / Nino Louarsabishvili	6; 4	7; 5

- Ukraine placed last in the pool, and thus was relegated to Group II in 1996, where they achieved advancement back into Group I for 1997.

== See also ==
- Fed Cup structure
