= Ako Edward Oben =

Cameroonian professor (1951–2025)

- Born: 18 May 1951; Ossing, British Cameroons
- Died: 18 August 2025 (aged 74); Yaoundé, Cameroon
- Citizenship: Cameroonian
- Education: University of Yaoundé (BA); Atlanta University (MA); University of Illinois (PhD)
- Occupation: Academic Professor/Lecturer
- Notable work: Migration, Culture, and Transnational Identities: Critical Essays/American Literature: Periods, Trends, and Themes
- Title: Professor of African Literature
- Children: 4

Ako Edward Oben (18 May 1951 – 18 August 2025) was a Cameroonian academic professor and administrator. He held several key positions in higher education, including serving as the rector of the University of Maroua from 2008 to 2017.

== Early life and education ==
Ako Edward Oben was born on 18 May 1951 in Ossing village, Cameroon, as a member of the BohAko clan. His early education began at Basel Mission Primary School in Ossing in 1956, where he obtained his First School Leaving Certificate in 1963. He then attended Bilingual Grammar School at Man O'War Bay, earning his General Certificate of Education (GCE) Ordinary Level in 1969.

For higher education, he obtained his GCE Advanced Level at the Cameroon College of Arts, Science and Technology, Bambili in 1971. He then pursued a Bilingual degree in English and French at the University of Yaoundé, graduating with a BA (Hons) in 1975. After moving to the United States in 1976, he earned a Master of Arts in Afro-American Studies from Atlanta University in 1978. He began his doctoral research at the University of Illinois Urbana-Champaign in 1979, during which he worked as a junior lecturer. He obtained his PhD in Comparative Literature in 1982, returning to Cameroon that year.

== Career ==
After returning to Cameroon, Oben worked as a senior lecturer at the University of Yaoundé until 1992. He was appointed vice-rector for the University of Yaoundé I in 1997, a position he held until 2003. During his first year as vice-rector, he directed all aspects of university management as the rector position was vacant. He headed the university's academic affairs from 1998 to 2000 before being placed in charge of research and cooperation until the end of his tenure. He was a technical advisor to the presidency of Cameroon from 2003 to 2008, where he headed the Division of Cultural and Social Affairs. He served as rector for the University of Maroua from 2008 until 27 June 2017. He was elected First Vice President of the Association of African Universities, helping shape higher education policies across Africa. He supervised over 20 PhD students and more than 40 Master's degree candidates.

== Personal life and death ==
Oben was married and had four children. He died aged 74 on 18 August 2025 at Yaoundé General Hospital.

== Publications ==
Notable works include:

- "Migration, Culture, and Transnational Identities: Critical Essays" – a scholarly exploration of migration and identity in a globalized world.
- "American Literature: Periods, Trends, and Themes" – co-authored with Sarah Anyang Agbor and Manyaka Toko Djockoua

== See also ==
- Dorothy Limunga
- Nalova Lyonga
- Jacques Feme Ndongo
