= 1996 Fed Cup Europe/Africa Zone Group I – Pool C =

International tennis competition

Group C of the 1996 Fed Cup Europe/Africa Zone Group I was one of four pools in the Europe/Africa Zone Group I of the 1996 Fed Cup. Four teams competed in a round robin competition, with the top two teams advancing to the knockout stage and the bottom team being relegated down to Group II for 1996.

	(Switzerland) SUI	(Croatia) CRO	(Georgia (country)) GEO	(Federal Republic of Yugoslavia) YUG	RR; W–L	Set; W–L	Game; W–L	Standings
Switzerland		2–1	3–0	3–0	3–0	16–3	111–54	1
Croatia	1–2		3–0	3–0	2–1	15–6	104–82	2
Georgia	0–3	0–3		2–1	1–2	5–15	70–101	3
Yugoslavia	0–3	0–3	1–2		0–3	4–16	60–108	4

== Switzerland vs. Yugoslavia ==
Switzerland
3
La Manga Club, Murcia, Spain
22 April 1996
Red clay (outdoors)

Yugoslavia
0

			1	2	3
1	(Switzerland) (Federal Republic of Yugoslavia)	Patty Schnyder; Sandra Naćuk	6; 2	6; 3
2	(Switzerland) (Federal Republic of Yugoslavia)	Martina Hingis; Branislava Ivanović	6; 2	6; 1
3	(Switzerland) (Federal Republic of Yugoslavia)	Angela Bürgis / Martina Hingis; Sandra Naćuk / Dragana Zarić	6; 1	6; 3

== Croatia vs. Georgia ==
Croatia
3
La Manga Club, Murcia, Spain
22 April 1996
Red clay (outdoors)

Georgia
0

			1	2	3
1	(Croatia) (Georgia (country))	Mirjana Lučić; Sofia Managadze	6; 3	6; 3
2	(Croatia) (Georgia (country))	Iva Majoli; Nino Louarsabishvili	7; 5	0; 6	6; 4
3	(Croatia) (Georgia (country))	Maja Murić / Silvija Talaja; Nino Louarsabishvili / Sofia Managadze	6; 1	6; 1

== Switzerland vs. Georgia ==
Switzerland
3
La Manga Club, Murcia, Spain
23 April 1996
Red clay (outdoors)

Georgia
0

			1	2	3
1	(Switzerland) (Georgia (country))	Patty Schnyder; Sofia Managadze	6; 2	6; 0
2	(Switzerland) (Georgia (country))	Martina Hingis; Nino Louarsabishvili	6; 1	6; 1
3	(Switzerland) (Georgia (country))	Angela Bürgis / Emanuela Zardo; Nino Louarsabishvili / Sofia Managadze	7^{7} 6^{4}	7; 5

== Croatia vs. Yugoslavia ==
Croatia
3
La Manga Club, Murcia, Spain
23 April 1996
Red clay (outdoors)

Yugoslavia
0

			1	2	3
1	(Croatia) (Federal Republic of Yugoslavia)	Mirjana Lučić; Sandra Naćuk	6; 4	3; 6	7; 5
2	(Croatia) (Federal Republic of Yugoslavia)	Iva Majoli; Dragana Zarić	6; 2	6; 2
3	(Croatia) (Federal Republic of Yugoslavia)	Maja Murić / Silvija Talaja; Sandra Naćuk / Dragana Zarić	6; 2	6; 1

== Switzerland vs. Croatia ==
Switzerland
2
La Manga Club, Murcia, Spain
24 April 1996
Red clay (outdoors)

Croatia
1

			1	2	3
1	(Switzerland) (Croatia)	Emanuela Zardo; Mirjana Lučić	4; 6	3; 6
2	(Switzerland) (Croatia)	Martina Hingis; Iva Majoli	5; 7	6; 1	6; 1
3	(Switzerland) (Croatia)	Angela Bürgis / Martina Hingis; Mirjana Lučić / Iva Majoli	6; 1	7; 5

== Georgia vs. Yugoslavia ==
Georgia
2
La Manga Club, Murcia, Spain
24 April 1996
Red clay (outdoors)

Yugoslavia
1

			1	2	3
1	(Georgia (country)) (Federal Republic of Yugoslavia)	Sofia Managadze; Sandra Naćuk	2; 6	6; 3	6; 4
2	(Georgia (country)) (Federal Republic of Yugoslavia)	Nino Louarsabishvili; Branislava Ivanović	6; 1	6; 4
3	(Georgia (country)) (Federal Republic of Yugoslavia)	Nino Louarsabishvili / Sofia Managadze; Sandra Naćuk / Dragana Zarić	2; 6	4; 6

- Yugoslavia placed last in the pool, and thus was relegated to Group II in 1997, where they placed first in their pool of six, and thus advanced back to Group I for 1998.

== See also ==
- Fed Cup structure
