= 1996 Fed Cup Europe/Africa Zone Group I – Pool B =

International tennis competition

Group B of the 1996 Fed Cup Europe/Africa Zone Group I was one of four pools in the Europe/Africa Zone Group I of the 1996 Fed Cup. Four teams competed in a round robin competition, with the top two teams advancing to the knockout stage and the bottom team being relegated down to Group II for 1996.

| | (Italy) ITA | (Sweden) SWE | (Latvia) LAT | (Norway) NOR | RR; W–L | Set; W–L | Game; W–L | Standings |
| Italy | | 3–0 | 2–1 | 3–0 | 3–0 | 16–5 | 114–78 | 1 |
| Sweden | 0–3 | | 3–0 | 3–0 | 2–1 | 9–7 | 79–70 | 2 |
| Latvia | 1–2 | 0–3 | | 3–0 | 1–2 | 9–6 | 77–63 | 3 |
| Norway | 0–3 | 0–3 | 0–3 | | 0–3 | 2–18 | 56–115 | 4 |

== Italy vs. Latvia ==
Italy
2
La Manga Club, Murcia, Spain
22 April 1996
Red clay (outdoors)

Latvia
1

| | | | 1 | 2 | 3 |
|---|---|---|---|---|---|
| 1 | (Italy) (Latvia) | Adriana Serra Zanetti; Anna Barinova | 6; 4 | 6; 2 |
| 2 | (Italy) (Latvia) | Rita Grande; Larisa Neiland | 6; 2 | 7^{7} 6^{1} |
| 3 | (Italy) (Latvia) | Laura Golarsa / Rita Grande; Anna Barinova / Larisa Neiland | 2; 6 | 3; 6 |

== Sweden vs. Norway ==
Sweden
3
La Manga Club, Murcia, Spain
22 April 1996
Red clay (outdoors)

Norway
0

| | | | 1 | 2 | 3 |
|---|---|---|---|---|---|
| 1 | (Sweden) (Norway) | Åsa Carlsson; Tina Samara | 6; 3 | 6; 1 |
| 2 | (Sweden) (Norway) | Anna-Karin Svensson; Mette Sigmundstad | 6; 2 | 6; 2 |
| 3 | (Sweden) (Norway) | Maria Lindström / Anna-Karin Svensson; Karoline Borgersen / Tina Samara | 6; 3 | 6; 3 |

== Italy vs. Sweden ==
Italy
2
La Manga Club, Murcia, Spain
23 April 1996
Red clay (outdoors)

Sweden
1

| | | | 1 | 2 | 3 |
|---|---|---|---|---|---|
| 1 | (Italy) (Sweden) | Adriana Serra Zanetti; Åsa Carlsson | 6; 4 | 6; 3 |
| 2 | (Italy) (Sweden) | Rita Grande; Anna-Karin Svensson | 6; 4 | 6^{1} 7^{7} | 6; 2 |
| 3 | (Italy) (Sweden) | Nathalie Baudone / Laura Golarsa; Anna-Karin Svensson / Maria Lindström | 6; 4 | 6; 1 |

== Latvia vs. Norway ==
Latvia
3
La Manga Club, Murcia, Spain
23 April 1996
Red clay (outdoors)

Norway
0

| | | | 1 | 2 | 3 |
|---|---|---|---|---|---|
| 1 | (Latvia) (Norway) | Anna Barinova; Karoline Borgersen | 6; 4 | 7; 5 |
| 2 | (Latvia) (Norway) | Larisa Neiland; Tina Samara | 6; 1 | 6; 0 |
| 3 | (Latvia) (Norway) | Anna Barinova / Larisa Neiland; Karoline Borgersen / Tina Samara | 6; 2 | 6; 3 |

== Italy vs. Norway ==
Italy
3
La Manga Club, Murcia, Spain
24 April 1996
Red clay (outdoors)

Norway
0

| | | | 1 | 2 | 3 |
|---|---|---|---|---|---|
| 1 | (Italy) (Norway) | Laura Golarsa; Karoline Borgersen | 6; 2 | 3; 6 | 6; 2 |
| 2 | (Italy) (Norway) | Nathalie Baudone; Mette Sigmundstad | 6; 2 | 6; 2 |
| 3 | (Italy) (Norway) | Nathalie Baudone / Laura Golarsa; Karoline Borgersen / Tina Samara | 7^{7} 6^{5} | 2; 6 | 6; 1 |

== Sweden vs. Latvia ==
Sweden
3
La Manga Club, Murcia, Spain
24 April 1996
Red clay (outdoors)

Latvia
0

| | | | 1 | 2 | 3 |
|---|---|---|---|---|---|---|
| 1 | (Sweden) (Latvia) | Anna-Karin Svensson; Larisa Neiland | 4; 1 | | | retired |
| 2 | (Sweden) (Latvia) | Åsa Carlsson; Anna Barinova | 1; 6 | 7; 5 | 6; 2 |
| 3 | (Sweden) (Latvia) | Anna-Karin Svensson / Maria Lindström; Anna Barinova / Larisa Neiland | | | | w/o |

- Norway placed last in the pool, and thus was relegated to Group II in 1997, where they placed fourth in their pool of six.

== See also ==
- Fed Cup structure
