= 1996 Fed Cup Europe/Africa Zone Group I – Pool A =

International tennis competition

Group A of the 1996 Fed Cup Europe/Africa Zone Group I was one of four pools in the Europe/Africa Zone Group I of the 1996 Fed Cup. Four teams competed in a round robin competition, with the top two teams advancing to the knockout stage and the bottom team being relegated down to Group II for 1996.

	(Russia) RUS	(Belarus) BLR	(Slovenia) SLO	(United Kingdom) GBR	RR; W–L	Set; W–L	Game; W–L	Standings
Russia		1–2	3–0	3–0	2–1	15–6	112–85	1
Belarus	2–1		0–3	2–1	2–1	8–12	95–112	2
Slovenia	0–3	3–0		1–2	1–2	10–10	87–89	3
Great Britain	0–3	1–2	2–1		1–2	7–12	90–98	4

== Russia vs. Slovenia ==
Russia
3
La Manga Club, Murcia, Spain
22 April 1996
Red clay (outdoors)

Slovenia
0

			1	2	3
1	(Russia) (Slovenia)	Elena Likhovtseva; Tina Križan	2; 6	6; 1	6; 2
2	(Russia) (Slovenia)	Elena Makarova; Barbara Mulej	6; 3	6; 3
3	(Russia) (Slovenia)	Anna Kournikova / Elena Makarova; Tjaša Jezernik / Tina Križan	6; 4	5; 7	7; 5

== Belarus vs. Great Britain ==
Belarus
2
La Manga Club, Murcia, Spain
22 April 1996
Red clay (outdoors)

Great Britain
1

			1	2	3
1	(Belarus) (United Kingdom)	Tatiana Ignatieva; Samantha Smith	2; 6	3; 6
2	(Belarus) (United Kingdom)	Natasha Zvereva; Clare Wood	7^{7} 6^{3}	4; 6	6; 3
3	(Belarus) (United Kingdom)	Olga Barabanschikova / Tatiana Ignatieva; Valda Lake / Clare Wood	7; 5	7^{7} 6^{2}

== Russia vs. Great Britain ==
Russia
3
La Manga Club, Murcia, Spain
23 April 1996
Red clay (outdoors)

Great Britain
0

			1	2	3
1	(Russia) (United Kingdom)	Elena Likhovtseva; Clare Wood	6; 4	6; 4
2	(Russia) (United Kingdom)	Elena Makarova; Samantha Smith	6; 1	6; 3
3	(Russia) (United Kingdom)	Anna Kournikova / Elena Makarova; Samantha Smith / Clare Wood	7^{7} 6^{3}	6; 1

== Belarus vs. Slovenia ==
Belarus
0
La Manga Club, Murcia, Spain
23 April 1996
Red clay (outdoors)

Slovenia
3

			1	2	3
1	(Belarus) (Slovenia)	Tatiana Ignatieva; Tina Križan	4; 6	1; 6
2	(Belarus) (Slovenia)	Olga Barabanschikova; Barbara Mulej	2; 6	3; 6
3	(Belarus) (Slovenia)	Tatiana Ignatieva / Natasha Zvereva; Tjaša Jezernik / Tina Križan	5; 7	3; 6

== Russia vs. Belarus ==
Russia
1
La Manga Club, Murcia, Spain
24 April 1996
Red clay (outdoors)

Belarus
2

			1	2	3
1	(Russia) (Belarus)	Elena Makarova; Olga Barabanschikova	3; 6	4; 6
2	(Russia) (Belarus)	Elena Likhovtseva; Natasha Zvereva	6; 4	4; 6	4; 6
3	(Russia) (Belarus)	Anna Kournikova / Elena Makarova; Tatiana Ignatieva / Natasha Zvereva	6; 3	4; 6	6; 4

== Slovenia vs. Great Britain ==
Slovenia
1
La Manga Club, Murcia, Spain
24 April 1996
Red clay (outdoors)

Great Britain
2

			1	2	3
1	(Slovenia) (United Kingdom)	Barbara Mulej; Samantha Smith	6; 3	6; 4
2	(Slovenia) (United Kingdom)	Tina Križan; Clare Wood	5; 7	2; 6
3	(Slovenia) (United Kingdom)	Tjaša Jezernik / Tina Križan; Samantha Smith / Clare Wood	1; 6	5; 7

- Great Britain placed last in the pool, and thus was relegated to Group II in 1997, where they placed first in their pool of six, and thus advanced back to Group I for 1998.

== See also ==
- Fed Cup structure
