= 1995 Fed Cup Europe/Africa Zone Group I – Pool D =

International tennis competition

Group D of the 1995 Fed Cup Europe/Africa Zone Group I was one of four pools in the Europe/Africa Zone Group I of the 1995 Fed Cup. Four teams competed in a round robin competition, with the top two teams advancing to the knockout stage and the bottom team being relegated down to Group II for 1996.

== Results ==
	(Belgium) BEL	(Romania) ROU	(Croatia) CRO	(Israel) ISR	RR; W–L	Set; W–L	Game; W–L	Standings
Belgium		2–1	2–1	3–0	3–0	14–5	105–70	1
Romania	1–2		2–1	3–0	2–1	12–8	96–83	2
Croatia	1–2	1–2		3–0	1–2	11–9	97–90	3
Israel	0–3	0–3	0–3		0–3	3–18	65–120	4

=== Belgium vs. Croatia ===
Belgium
2
La Manga Club, Murcia, Spain
17 April 1995
Clay (outdoors)

Croatia
1

			1	2	3
1	(Belgium) (Croatia)	Laurence Courtois; Maja Palaveršić	6; 2	7^{7} 6^{1}
2	(Belgium) (Croatia)	Sabine Appelmans; Iva Majoli	6; 2	6; 2
3	(Belgium) (Croatia)	Sabine Appelmans / Els Callens; Nadin Ercegović / Silvija Talaja	3; 6	6^{5} 7^{7}

=== Romania vs. Israel ===
Romania
3
La Manga Club, Murcia, Spain
17 April 1995
Clay (outdoors)

Israel
0

			1	2	3
1	(Romania) (Israel)	Cătălina Cristea; Hila Rosen	6; 1	6; 3
2	(Romania) (Israel)	Ruxandra Dragomir; Anna Smashnova	6; 3	3; 6	6; 0
3	(Romania) (Israel)	Cătălina Cristea / Ruxandra Dragomir; Shiri Burstein / Tzipora Obziler	6; 4	6; 4

=== Belgium vs. Romania ===
Belgium
2
La Manga Club, Murcia, Spain
18 April 1995
Clay (outdoors)

Romania
1

			1	2	3
1	(Belgium) (Romania)	Laurence Courtois; Cătălina Cristea	7^{7} 6^{3}	6; 2
2	(Belgium) (Romania)	Sabine Appelmans; Ruxandra Dragomir	2; 6	4; 6
3	(Belgium) (Romania)	Laurence Courtois / Nancy Feber; Cătălina Cristea / Ruxandra Dragomir	6; 0	6; 2

=== Croatia vs. Israel ===
Croatia
3
La Manga Club, Murcia, Spain
18 April 1995
Clay (outdoors)

Israel
0

			1	2	3
1	(Croatia) (Israel)	Maja Palaveršić; Tzipora Obziler	6; 3	7^{7} 6^{5}
2	(Croatia) (Israel)	Iva Majoli; Anna Smashnova	6; 1	4; 6	6; 3
3	(Croatia) (Israel)	Nadin Ercegović / Silvija Talaja; Shiri Burstein / Tzipora Obziler	6; 0	6; 2

=== Romania vs. Croatia ===
Romania
2
La Manga Club, Murcia, Spain
19 April 1995
Clay (outdoors)

Croatia
1

			1	2	3
1	(Romania) (Croatia)	Cătălina Cristea; Maja Palaveršić	6; 3	7^{7} 6^{2}
2	(Romania) (Croatia)	Ruxandra Dragomir; Iva Majoli	4; 6	2; 6
3	(Romania) (Croatia)	Cătălina Cristea / Ruxandra Dragomir; Nadin Ercegović / Iva Majoli	4; 6	6; 3	6; 1

=== Belgium vs. Israel ===
Belgium
3
La Manga Club, Murcia, Spain
19 April 1995
Clay (outdoors)

Israel
0

			1	2	3
1	(Belgium) (Israel)	Laurence Courtois; Hila Rosen	6; 2	6; 4
2	(Belgium) (Israel)	Sabine Appelmans; Anna Smashnova	6; 2	6; 4
3	(Belgium) (Israel)	Els Callens / Nancy Feber; Tzipora Obziler / Hila Rosen	6; 2	4; 6	6; 3

- Israel placed last in the pool, and thus was relegated to Group II in 1996, where they achieved advancement back into Group I for 1997.

== See also ==
- Fed Cup structure
