= O Cameroon, Cradle of Our Forefathers =

National anthem of Cameroon

O Cameroon, Cradle of our Forefathers
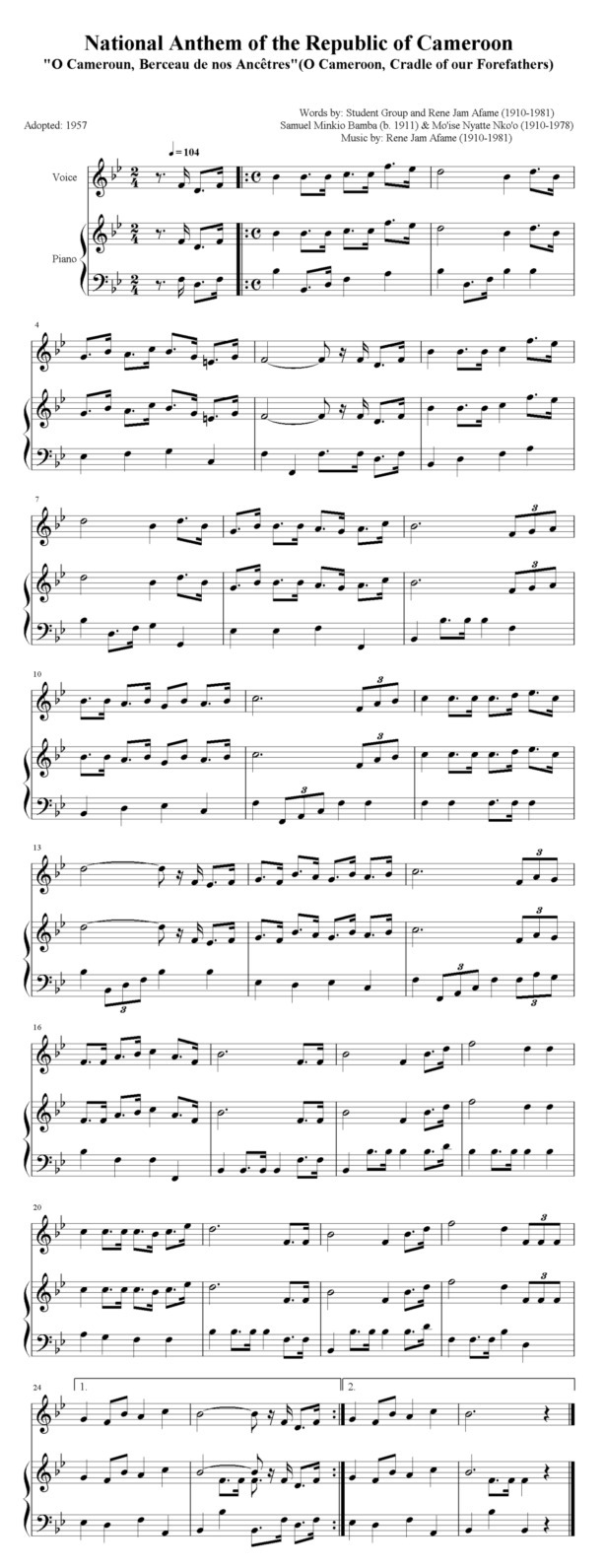
- National anthem of Cameroon
- Also known as: Chant de Ralliement (English: Rallying Song)
- Lyrics: René Jam Afame / Samuel Minkio Bamba / Moїse Nyatte Nko'o, 1928 (French version); Bernard Nsokika Fonlon, 1961 (English version)
- Music: René Jam Afane, 1928
- Adopted: 1957 (French version); 1978 (English version)

"Chant de Ralliement" ("Rallying Song"), also known as "Ô Cameroun berceau de nos ancêtres" ("O Cameroon, Cradle of our Forefathers"), is the national anthem of Cameroon and former national anthem of French Cameroon.

== History ==
The song was composed in 1928 by René Jam Afane who also wrote the lyrics along with Samuel Minkio Bamba and Moïse Nyatte Nko'o, all while they were students at the École Normale of Foulassi. It was used on an unofficial basis in French Cameroon beginning in 1948 before independence and officially adopted as the anthem of the territory in 1957. In 1960, the anthem was officially adopted by the new Republic of Cameroon.

In 1961, upon the accession of the former British Southern Cameroons to the Republic of Cameroon, an English version was written by Bernard Nsokika Fonlon, which was later officially adopted in 1978. In 1970, the French lyrics were changed to remove some words such as barbarie ("barbarianism") and sauvagerie ("savagery"), reference to France and the United Kingdom.

== Lyrics ==
The first verse and chorus are considered to be the official lyrics and are most frequently played at important occasions.

=== Current lyrics (1970–present) ===
French version

I
Ô Cameroun berceau de nos ancêtres,
Va debout et jaloux de ta liberté.
Comme un soleil ton drapeau fier doit être
Un symbole ardent de foi et d'unité.
Que tous tes enfants du nord au sud,
de l'est à l'ouest soient tout amour,
Te servir que ce soit leur (Note: Occasionally written le ("the").) seul but,
Pour remplir leur devoir toujours.

Refrain:
Chère patrie, terre chérie,
Tu es notre seul et vrai bonheur,
notre joie et notre vie,
À (Note: Occasionally written En ("In").) toi l'amour et le grand honneur

II
Tu es la tombe où dorment nos pères,
Le jardin que nos aïeux ont cultivé.
Nous travaillons pour te rendre prospère,
Un beau jour enfin nous serons arrivés.
De l'Afrique sois fidèle enfant
Et progresse toujours en paix,
Espérant que tes jeunes enfants
T'aimeront sans bornes à jamais.

Refrain

English translation of French version

I
O Cameroon, cradle of our ancestors,
Go, upright and protective of your freedom.
Like a sun, your proud flag must be
An ardent symbol of faith and unity.
May all your children, from North to South
From East to West, be all love,
May serving you be their only goal
To fulfil their duty always.

Chorus:
Dear Fatherland, cherished land,
You are our one and true happiness.
Our joy and our life
To you, love and great honour.

II
You are the grave where our fathers sleep,
The garden that our ancestors have cultivated.
We work to make you prosperous
One fine day we will finally get there.
Be Africa's faithful child
And always progress in peace
Hoping that your young children
Will love you without bounds forever.

Chorus

English version

I
O Cameroon, Thou Cradle of our Fathers,
Holy Shrine where in our midst they now repose,
Their tears and blood and sweat thy soil did water,
On thy hills and valleys once their tillage rose.
Dear Fatherland, thy worth no tongue can tell!
How can we ever pay thy due?
Thy welfare we will win in toil and love and peace,
Will be to thy name ever true!

Chorus:
Land of Promise, land of Glory!
Thou, of life and joy, our only store!
Thine be honour, thine devotion,
And deep endearment, for evermore.

II
From Shari, from where the Mungo meanders
From along the banks of lowly Boumba Stream,
Muster thy sons in union close around thee,
Mighty as the Buea Mountain be their team;
Instil in them the love of gentle ways,
Regret for errors of the past;
Foster, for Mother Africa, a loyalty
That true shall remain to the last.

Chorus

=== In local languages ===
The anthem has also been translated into several local languages.

Ewondo lyrics

I
Á Kamərún onə ǹnam bə́vámbá
Tə́bə́gə́ ósú ókaman fə ai filí dzoe
Anə ǹlódzób etsíga dzóe yáyean bɔ́
Ndem edǐŋ ai e nyí anyang á zǎŋ bɔ́n bóé
Kyé á bɔ́n bə́sə yá sí Kamərún
Aa tádígí á búg sí di akələ kuí éfas evɔ́g
Bǒ nǎ bə́sə bə́fulan ǹnə́m m̀bɔ́g
Mból ye nâ bəvə kɔ á mam mə́sə.

Mesulí:
Mbəmbə ǹnam wân, Mbəmbə ǹnam edǐŋ
Onə afidi dân ai mvǒm dzân
Mbəmbə ǹnam wân, Mbəmbə ǹnam edǐŋ
Edǐŋ ai wa ai olugú ásə.

Adamawa Fulfulde lyrics

I
Ha Cameroun feaarou mamadjimenden,
Ndaranoda é Ngikkana Ndjimoumada.
Bana nangué toutawalma hanilaato,
Ndoum alama nouddinki é narralmen.
Nbikkon ma woila é fombina,
Diga founa é hirna fou nguidngnidtina.
Houwan goma tan wona noufoyé mabbé.
Ngambé kibbina alkawal.

Koorɗo:
Lesdimenden, Nguidaandimenden,
Ndoum tan woni djaynitaremen.
Seyomeenden, Ngédammeeden,
Yiidé é néddaal koufou Ngamma.

Ghomala lyrics

I
Ɔ̌ Kamerûn, thǝ́si pɔ́k mʉǝ̂gǝ̌jʉ',
Lu tsuú sí bíŋ cǝŋtǝ bɔ́mtǝ́ yu lǝ̀pʉǝ̀
Pâ' tsǝ́nam á, yu dzǝ̂gûŋ gɔ pǝ́ lǝŋnyǝ
Pǝ́ syamtiŋ gwyǝ́ nǝ́ nǝ́pîŋ pû ntàmtǝ̀
Gaǝ́ pô pǔ awɛ́ jyǝŋka' baa kwop
M ntǝ̂mnàm, m Bînam pǝ́ ntʉm ŋkùŋnyǝ̀
Nǝ́ pǝ̂ fá' bû pǝ́ da' máp mntǝ́mdyǝ́
Nǝ́ǝ gǝ́ǝ máp mfa' nǝ́ǝ guŋ mcwǝ awɛ́.

Píŋzhwòp:
Ɔ̌ guŋ mtʉǝdǝ̀ŋ, ɔ̌ cá' mtʉǝdǝ̀ŋ,
Ó o bǝ́ tsuú da' yɔk nǝ́puŋ nínyɔ,
Da' yɔk ŋwɛ́nyǝ́, baa yɔk nɛ́ǝ́cwǝ̂
Ŋkuŋnyǝ pǝ́ buu ba ghámt e gwyǝ́ bû.

=== Former lyrics (1957–1970) ===
French lyrics

I
O Cameroun, berceau de nos ancêtres,
Autrefois tu vécus dans la barbarie,
Comme un soleil, tu commences à paraitre,
Peu à peu tu sors de ta sauvagerie,
Que tous tes enfants du Nord au Sud,
De l'Est à l'Ouest soient tout amour,
Te servir que ce soit notre seul but,
Pour remplir notre devoir toujours.

Refrain:
Chère Patrie, terre chérie,
Tu es notre unique et vrai bonheur.
Notre joie et notre vie
A toi l’amour et le grand honneur.

II
Tu es la tombe où dorment nos pères,
Le jardin que nos aïeux ont cultivé.
Nous travaillons pour te rendre prospère,
Un beau jour enfin nous serons arrivés.
De l'Afrique sois fidèle enfant
Et progresse toujours en paix,
Espérant que tes jeunes enfants
T'aimeront sans bornes à jamais.

Refrain

English translation

I
O Cameroon, cradle of our ancestors,
You once lived in barbarism,
Like a sun, you start to appear,
Little by little you come out of your savagery,
May all your children, from North to South
From East to West, be all love,
May serving you be our only goal
To fulfil their duty always.

Chorus:
Dear Fatherland, dear land,
You are our unique and true happiness.
Our joy and our life
To you, love and great honour.

II
You are the grave where our fathers sleep,
The garden that our ancestors have cultivated.
We work to make you prosperous
One fine day we will finally get there.
Be Africa's faithful child
And always progress in peace
Hoping that your young children
Will love you without bounds forever.

Chorus
