= 1995 Fed Cup Europe/Africa Zone Group I – Pool A =

International tennis competition

Group A of the 1995 Fed Cup Europe/Africa Zone Group I was one of four pools in the Europe/Africa Zone Group I of the 1995 Fed Cup. Four teams competed in a round robin competition, with the top two teams advancing to the knockout stage and the bottom team being relegated down to Group II for 1996.

	(Slovenia) SLO	(Czech Republic) CZE	(United Kingdom) GBR	(Poland) POL	RR; W–L	Set; W–L	Game; W–L	Standings
Slovenia		2–1	2–1	2–1	3–0	15–9	111–93	1
Czech Republic	1–2		3–0	3–0	2–1	15–7	114–82	2
Great Britain	1–2	0–3		2–1	1–2	8–13	82–106	3
Poland	1–2	0–3	1–2		0–3	6–15	88–114	4

== Slovenia vs. Great Britain ==
Slovenia
2
La Manga Club, Murcia, Spain
17 April 1995
Clay (outdoors)

Great Britain
1

			1	2	3
1	(Slovenia) (United Kingdom)	Barbara Mulej; Julie Pullin	6; 1	6; 3
2	(Slovenia) (United Kingdom)	Tina Križan; Clare Wood	4; 6	6; 1	6; 1
3	(Slovenia) (United Kingdom)	Tjaša Jezernik / Tina Križan; Jo Durie / Clare Wood	6; 2	1; 6	2; 6

== Czech Republic vs. Poland ==
Czech Republic
3
La Manga Club, Murcia, Spain
17 April 1995
Clay (outdoors)

Poland
0

			1	2	3
1	(Czech Republic) (Poland)	Helena Suková; Magdalena Grzybowska	7; 5	6; 3
2	(Czech Republic) (Poland)	Jana Novotná; Katarzyna Nowak	6; 4	6; 3
3	(Czech Republic) (Poland)	Radka Bobková / Petra Langrová; Magdalena Grzybowska / Aleksandra Olsza	6; 3	3; 6	6; 2

== Slovenia vs. Poland ==
Slovenia
2
La Manga Club, Murcia, Spain
18 April 1995
Clay (outdoors)

Poland
1

			1	2	3
1	(Slovenia) (Poland)	Barbara Mulej; Aleksandra Olsza	6; 4	1; 6	6; 4
2	(Slovenia) (Poland)	Tina Križan; Magdalena Grzybowska	7; 5	6; 3
3	(Slovenia) (Poland)	Tjaša Jezernik / Karin Lusnić; Magdalena Grzybowska / Aleksandra Olsza	6; 1	4; 6	1; 6

== Czech Republic vs. Great Britain ==
Czech Republic
3
La Manga Club, Murcia, Spain
18 April 1995
Clay (outdoors)

Great Britain
0

			1	2	3
1	(Czech Republic) (United Kingdom)	Helena Suková; Shirli-Ann Siddall	6; 3	6; 2
2	(Czech Republic) (United Kingdom)	Jana Novotná; Clare Wood	6; 2	6; 2
3	(Czech Republic) (United Kingdom)	Jana Novotná / Helena Suková; Jo Durie / Clare Wood	6^{10} 7^{12}	6; 1	6; 2

== Slovenia vs. Czech Republic ==
Slovenia
2
La Manga Club, Murcia, Spain
19 April 1995
Clay (outdoors)

Czech Republic
1

			1	2	3
1	(Slovenia) (Czech Republic)	Barbara Mulej; Helena Suková	7^{7} 6^{5}	6; 2
2	(Slovenia) (Czech Republic)	Tina Križan; Jana Novotná	0; 6	6; 3	6; 3
3	(Slovenia) (Czech Republic)	Tjaša Jezernik / Tina Križan; Radka Bobková / Petra Langrová	6; 0	4; 6	2; 6

== Great Britain vs. Poland ==
Great Britain
2
La Manga Club, Murcia, Spain
19 April 1995
Clay (outdoors)

Poland
1

			1	2	3
1	(United Kingdom) (Poland)	Shirli-Ann Siddall; Aleksandra Olsza	6^{5} 7^{7}	5; 6
2	(United Kingdom) (Poland)	Clare Wood; Magdalena Grzybowska	7; 5	6; 1
3	(United Kingdom) (Poland)	Jo Durie / Clare Wood; Magdalena Grzybowska / Aleksandra Olsza	6; 2	7; 5

- Poland placed last in the pool, and thus was relegated to Group II in 1996, where they achieved advancement back into Group I for 1997.

== See also ==
- Fed Cup structure
