= 1997 Fed Cup Europe/Africa Zone Group II – Pool B =

International tennis competition

Group B of the 1997 Fed Cup Europe/Africa Zone Group II was one of four pools in the Europe/Africa zone of the 1997 Fed Cup. Six teams competed in a round robin competition, with the top team advancing to Group I for 1998.

	(Federal Republic of Yugoslavia) YUG	(Republic of Ireland) IRL	(Tunisia) TUN	(Algeria) ALG	(Cameroon) CMR	(Iceland) ISL	Match; W–L	Set; W–L	Game; W–L	Standings
Yugoslavia		3–0	3–0	3–0	3–0	3–0	5–0	30–1	185–70	1
Ireland	0–3		2–1	2–1	3–0	3–0	4–1	20–11	144–95	2
Tunisia	0–3	1–2		2–1	3–0	3–0	3–2	19–13	150–111	3
Algeria	0–3	1–2	1–2		3–0	3–0	2–3	17–15	122–127	4
Cameroon	0–3	0–3	0–3	0–3		2–1	1–4	7–27	100–189	5
Iceland	0–3	0–3	0–3	0–3	1–2		0–5	3–29	77–186	6

== Yugoslavia vs. Algeria ==
Yugoslavia
3
Ali Bey Club, Manavgat, Turkey
5 May 1997
Red clay (outdoors)

Algeria
0

			1	2	3
1	(Federal Republic of Yugoslavia) (Algeria)	Sandra Naćuk; Lamia Hameurlaine	6; 0	6; 1
2	(Federal Republic of Yugoslavia) (Algeria)	Dragana Zarić; Ouarda Bouchabou	6; 0	6; 1
3	(Federal Republic of Yugoslavia) (Algeria)	Dragana Ilić / Ljiljana Nanušević; Lamia Hameurlaine / Samira Takourabet	6; 3	6; 3

== Ireland vs. Tunisia ==
Ireland
2
Ali Bey Club, Manavgat, Turkey
5 May 1997
Red clay (outdoors)

Tunisia
1

			1	2	3
1	(Republic of Ireland) (Tunisia)	Karen Nugent; Ines Zouabi	6; 1	6; 0
2	(Republic of Ireland) (Tunisia)	Gina Niland; Selima Sfar	2; 6	0; 6
3	(Republic of Ireland) (Tunisia)	Gina Niland / Karen Nugent; Selima Sfar / Ines Zouabi	6; 4	6; 4

== Cameroon vs. Iceland ==
Cameroon
2
Ali Bey Club, Manavgat, Turkey
5 May 1997
Red clay (outdoors)

Iceland
1

			1	2	3
1	(Cameroon) (Iceland)	Christine Njeuma; Iris Staub	1; 6	7^{7} 6^{5}	6; 2
2	(Cameroon) (Iceland)	Nathalie Sienkob; Stefanía Stefánsdóttir	6; 3	6; 3
3	(Cameroon) (Iceland)	Agathe Belibi / Nathalie Sienkob; Iris Staub / Stefanía Stefánsdóttir	3; 6	6; 2	5; 7

== Yugoslavia vs. Iceland ==
Yugoslavia
3
Ali Bey Club, Manavgat, Turkey
6 May 1997
Red clay (outdoors)

Iceland
0

			1	2	3
1	(Federal Republic of Yugoslavia) (Iceland)	Ljiljana Nanušević; Iris Staub	6; 2	6; 0
2	(Federal Republic of Yugoslavia) (Iceland)	Dragana Zarić; Stefanía Stefánsdóttir	6; 2	6; 2
3	(Federal Republic of Yugoslavia) (Iceland)	Dragana Ilić / Ljiljana Nanušević; Júlíana Jónsdóttir / Stefanía Stefánsdóttir	6; 0	6; 2

== Ireland vs. Algeria ==
Ireland
3
Ali Bey Club, Manavgat, Turkey
6 May 1997
Red clay (outdoors)

Algeria
0

			1	2	3
1	(Republic of Ireland) (Algeria)	Zara Wolseley; Lamia Hameurlaine	0; 6	1; 6
2	(Republic of Ireland) (Algeria)	Gina Niland; Ouarda Bouchabou	6; 0	6; 2
3	(Republic of Ireland) (Algeria)	Gina Niland / Karen Nugent; Ouarda Bouchabou / Lamia Hameurlaine	6; 1	6; 1

== Tunisia vs. Cameroon ==
Tunisia
3
Ali Bey Club, Manavgat, Turkey
6 May 1997
Red clay (outdoors)

Cameroon
0

			1	2	3
1	(Tunisia) (Cameroon)	Ines Zouabi; Agathe Belibi	6; 2	6; 0
2	(Tunisia) (Cameroon)	Selima Sfar; Nathalie Sienkob	6; 0	6; 1
3	(Tunisia) (Cameroon)	Aicha Ferjani / Selima Sfar; Christine Njeuma / Nathalie Sienkob	6; 0	7; 5

== Yugoslavia vs. Cameroon ==
Yugoslavia
3
Ali Bey Club, Manavgat, Turkey
7 May 1997
Red clay (outdoors)

Cameroon
0

			1	2	3
1	(Federal Republic of Yugoslavia) (Cameroon)	Dragana Ilić; Christine Njeuma	7^{7} 6^{3}	6; 4
2	(Federal Republic of Yugoslavia) (Cameroon)	Sandra Naćuk; Nathalie Sienkob	6; 0	6; 0
3	(Federal Republic of Yugoslavia) (Cameroon)	Dragana Ilić / Ljiljana Nanušević; Christine Njeuma / Nathalie Sienkob	6; 3	6; 3

== Ireland vs. Iceland ==
Ireland
3
Ali Bey Club, Manavgat, Turkey
7 May 1997
Red clay (outdoors)

Iceland
0

			1	2	3
1	(Republic of Ireland) (Iceland)	Zara Wolseley; Júlíana Jónsdóttir	6; 1	6; 0
2	(Republic of Ireland) (Iceland)	Gina Niland; Iris Staub	6; 0	6; 0
3	(Republic of Ireland) (Iceland)	Gina Niland / Zara Wolseley; Iris Staub / Stefanía Stefánsdóttir	6; 1	6; 2

== Tunisia vs. Algeria ==
Tunisia
2
Ali Bey Club, Manavgat, Turkey
7 May 1997
Red clay (outdoors)

Algeria
1

			1	2	3
1	(Tunisia) (Algeria)	Ines Zouabi; Lamia Hameurlaine	3; 6	2; 6
2	(Tunisia) (Algeria)	Selima Sfar; Ouarda Bouchabou	6; 1	6; 0
3	(Tunisia) (Algeria)	Selima Sfar / Ines Zouabi; Ouarda Bouchabou / Lamia Hameurlaine	6; 1	5; 7	6; 0

== Yugoslavia vs. Ireland ==
Yugoslavia
3
Ali Bey Club, Manavgat, Turkey
8 May 1997
Red clay (outdoors)

Ireland
0

			1	2	3
1	(Federal Republic of Yugoslavia) (Republic of Ireland)	Sandra Naćuk; Karen Nugent	6; 2	6; 4
2	(Federal Republic of Yugoslavia) (Republic of Ireland)	Dragana Zarić; Gina Niland	6; 2	6; 2
3	(Federal Republic of Yugoslavia) (Republic of Ireland)	Ljiljana Nanušević / Dragana Zarić; Karen Nugent / Lesley O'Halloran	6; 3	6; 4

== Tunisia vs. Iceland ==
Tunisia
3
Ali Bey Club, Manavgat, Turkey
8 May 1997
Red clay (outdoors)

Iceland
0

			1	2	3
1	(Tunisia) (Iceland)	Ines Zouabi; Iris Staub	6; 4	7^{7} 6^{5}
2	(Tunisia) (Iceland)	Selima Sfar; Stefanía Stefánsdóttir	6; 0	6; 0
3	(Tunisia) (Iceland)	Aicha Ferjani / Selima Sfar; Iris Staub / Stefanía Stefánsdóttir	6; 2	6; 4

== Algeria vs. Cameroon ==
Algeria
3
Ali Bey Club, Manavgat, Turkey
8 May 1997
Red clay (outdoors)

Cameroon
0

			1	2	3
1	(Algeria) (Cameroon)	Samira Takourabet; Christine Njeuma	6; 4	6; 1
2	(Algeria) (Cameroon)	Lamia Hameurlaine; Nathalie Sienkob	6; 4	6; 2
3	(Algeria) (Cameroon)	Lamia Hameurlaine / Samira Takourabet; Christine Njeuma / Nathalie Sienkob	4; 6	6; 1	6; 0

== Yugoslavia vs. Tunisia ==
Yugoslavia
3
Ali Bey Club, Manavgat, Turkey
9 May 1997
Red clay (outdoors)

Tunisia
0

			1	2	3
1	(Federal Republic of Yugoslavia) (Tunisia)	Sandra Naćuk; Ines Zouabi	6; 2	6; 2
2	(Federal Republic of Yugoslavia) (Tunisia)	Dragana Zarić; Selima Sfar	4; 6	6; 3	6; 4
3	(Federal Republic of Yugoslavia) (Tunisia)	Dragana Ilić / Ljiljana Nanušević; Aicha Ferjani / Ines Zouabi	6; 1	6; 3

== Ireland vs. Cameroon ==
Ireland
3
Ali Bey Club, Manavgat, Turkey
9 May 1997
Red clay (outdoors)

Cameroon
0

			1	2	3
1	(Republic of Ireland) (Cameroon)	Zara Wolseley; Christine Njeuma	3; 6	6; 1	6; 3
2	(Republic of Ireland) (Cameroon)	Gina Niland; Nathalie Sienkob	6; 2	6; 0
3	(Republic of Ireland) (Cameroon)	Gina Niland / Zara Wolseley; Christine Njeuma / Nathalie Sienkob	7^{7} 6^{2}	6; 0

== Algeria vs. Iceland ==
Algeria
3
Ali Bey Club, Manavgat, Turkey
9 May 1997
Red clay (outdoors)

Iceland
0

			1	2	3
1	(Algeria) (Iceland)	Samira Takourabet; Iris Staub	7^{9} 6^{7}	6; 2
2	(Algeria) (Iceland)	Lamia Hameurlaine; Stefanía Stefánsdóttir	6; 2	6; 3
3	(Algeria) (Iceland)	Lamia Hameurlaine / Samira Takourabet; Iris Staub / Stefanía Stefánsdóttir	6; 1	6; 0

- Yugoslavia placed first in the pool, and thus advanced to Group I in 1998, where they placed third in their group of four.

== See also ==
- Fed Cup structure
