= Tjaša Jezernik =

Slovenian tennis player

- Full name: Tjaša Jezernik
- Country (sports): Slovenia
- Born: 17 June 1977 (age 47); Celje, SFR Yugoslavia
- Prize money: $11,782

Singles
- Career record: 38–42
- Career titles: 1 ITF
- Highest ranking: 416 (4 December 1995)

Doubles
- Career record: 34–35
- Career titles: 3 ITF
- Highest ranking: 305 (12 September 1994)

Team competitions
- Fed Cup: 1–6

Tjaša Jezernik (born 17 June 1977 in Celje) is a Slovenian retired tennis player.

Jezernik won one singles and three doubles titles on the ITF tour in her career. On 4 December 1995, she reached her best singles ranking of world number 416. On 12 September 1994, she peaked at world number 305 in the doubles rankings.

Jezernik made a total of seven appearances for Slovenia in Fed Cup competition.

== ITF finals (4–3) ==
=== Singles (1–1) ===
Legend $100,000 tournaments $75,000 tournaments $50,000 tournaments $25,000 tournaments $10,000 tournaments	Finals by surface Hard (0–0) Clay (1–1) Grass (0–0) Carpet (0–0)

Outcome	No.	Date	Tournament	Surface	Opponent	Score
Winner	1.	6 June 1994	Murska Sobota, Slovenia	Clay	(Italy) Yasmin Angeli	7–5, 6–4
Runner-up	1.	31 July 1995	Horb am Neckar, Germany	Clay	(Czech Republic) Zdeňka Málková	6–2, 1–6, 3–6

=== Doubles (3–2) ===
Legend $100,000 tournaments $75,000 tournaments $50,000 tournaments $25,000 tournaments $10,000 tournaments	Finals by surface Hard (2–0) Clay (1–2) Grass (0–0) Carpet (0–0)

Outcome	No.	Date	Tournament	Surface	Partner	Opponents	Score
Runner-up	1.	29 March 1993	Marsa, Malta	Clay	(Hungary) Virág Csurgó	(Czech Republic) Klára Bláhová (Croatia) Maja Murić	3–6, 7–5, 3–6
Winner	1.	13 September 1993	Adriatic, Croatia	Clay	(Slovakia) Simona Nedorostová	(Poland) Aleksandra Olsza (Czech Republic) Alena Vašková	3–6, 7–5, 6–4
Winner	2.	18 October 1993	Chihuahua, Mexico	Hard	(Czech Republic) Soňa Málková	(Mexico) Monica Bonilla (Mexico) Graciela Vélez	7–6^{(7–1)}, 6–1
Winner	3.	8 August 1994	College Park, United States	Hard	(Australia) Gail Biggs	(United States) Marissa Catlin (United States) Lindsay Lee-Waters	6–4, 7–5
Runner-up	2.	22 May 1995	Salzburg, Austria	Clay	(North Macedonia) Marina Lazarovska	(United States) Corina Morariu (Australia) Aarthi Venkatesan	w/o

== Fed Cup participation ==
=== Doubles ===
Edition	Stage	Date	Location	Against	Surface	Partner	Opponents	W/L	Score
1995 Fed Cup; Europe/Africa Zone Group I	R/R	17 April 1995	Murcia, Spain	(United Kingdom) Great Britain	Clay	(Slovenia) Tina Križan	(United Kingdom) Jo Durie (United Kingdom) Clare Wood	L	6–2, 1–6, 2–6
1995 Fed Cup; Europe/Africa Zone Group I	R/R	18 April 1995	Murcia, Spain	Poland	Clay	(Slovenia) Karin Lušnic	(Poland) Magdalena Grzybowska (Poland) Aleksandra Olsza	L	6–1, 4–6, 1–6
1995 Fed Cup; Europe/Africa Zone Group I	R/R	19 April 1995	Murcia, Spain	Czech Republic	Clay	(Slovenia) Tina Križan	(Czech Republic) Radka Bobková (Czech Republic) Petra Langrová	L	6–0, 4–6, 2–6
1995 Fed Cup; Europe/Africa Zone Group I	P/O	20 April 1995	Murcia, Spain	Czech Republic	Clay	(Slovenia) Tina Križan	(Czech Republic) Radka Bobková (Czech Republic) Petra Langrová	L	4–6, 4–6
1996 Fed Cup; Europe/Africa Zone Group I	R/R	22 April 1996	Murcia, Spain	Russia	Clay	(Slovenia) Tina Križan	(Russia) Anna Kournikova (Russia) Elena Makarova	L	4–6, 7–5, 5–7
1996 Fed Cup; Europe/Africa Zone Group I	R/R	23 April 1996	Murcia, Spain	Belarus	Clay	(Slovenia) Tina Križan	(Belarus) Tatiana Ignatieva (Belarus) Natasha Zvereva	W	7–5, 6–3
1996 Fed Cup; Europe/Africa Zone Group I	R/R	24 April 1996	Murcia, Spain	(United Kingdom) Great Britain	Clay	(Slovenia) Tina Križan	(United Kingdom) Samantha Smith (United Kingdom) Clare Wood	L	1–6, 5–7
