= 1996 Fed Cup Europe/Africa Zone Group I – Pool D =

International tennis competition

Group D of the 1996 Fed Cup Europe/Africa Zone Group I was one of four pools in the Europe/Africa Zone Group I of the 1996 Fed Cup. Four teams competed in a round robin competition, with the top two teams advancing to the knockout stage and the bottom team being relegated to Group II for 1996.

	(Romania) ROU	(Hungary) HUN	(Greece) GRE	(Portugal) POR	RR; W–L	Set; W–L	Game; W–L	Standings
Romania		2–1	2–1	3–0	3–0	15–4	104–58	1
Hungary	1–2		2–1	3–0	2–1	12–7	87–74	2
Greece	1–2	1–2		2–1	1–2	10–12	102–102	3
Portugal	0–3	0–3	1–2		0–3	3–17	58–117	4

== Romania vs. Greece ==
Romania
2
La Manga Club, Murcia, Spain
22 April 1996
Red clay (outdoors)

Greece
1

			1	2	3
1	(Romania) (Greece)	Cătălina Cristea; Christina Zachariadou	6; 0	7; 5
2	(Romania) (Greece)	Ruxandra Dragomir; Christína Papadáki	7; 5	6; 2
3	(Romania) (Greece)	Cătălina Cristea / Ruxandra Dragomir; Christína Papadáki / Christina Zachariadou	2; 6	6; 2	3; 6

== Hungary vs. Portugal ==
Hungary
3
La Manga Club, Murcia, Spain
22 April 1996
Red clay (outdoors)

Portugal
0

			1	2	3
1	(Hungary) (Portugal)	Anna Földényi; Joana Pedroso	6; 2	6; 0
2	(Hungary) (Portugal)	Andrea Temesvári; Sofia Prazeres	6; 3	6; 3
3	(Hungary) (Portugal)	Petra Mandula / Andrea Temesvári; Manuela Costa / Joana Pedroso	6; 1	6; 3

== Romania vs. Portugal ==
Romania
3
La Manga Club, Murcia, Spain
23 April 1996
Red clay (outdoors)

Portugal
0

			1	2	3
1	(Romania) (Portugal)	Cătălina Cristea; Ana Gaspar	6; 1	6; 2
2	(Romania) (Portugal)	Ruxandra Dragomir; Sofia Prazeres	6; 2	6; 2
3	(Romania) (Portugal)	Cătălina Cristea / Raluca Sandu; Manuela Costa / Joana Pedroso	6; 2	6; 4

== Hungary vs. Greece ==
Hungary
2
La Manga Club, Murcia, Spain
23 April 1996
Red clay (outdoors)

Greece
1

			1	2	3
1	(Hungary) (Greece)	Anna Földényi; Christina Zachariadou	6; 4	4; 6	6; 3
2	(Hungary) (Greece)	Andrea Temesvári; Christína Papadáki	1; 6	3; 6
3	(Hungary) (Greece)	Virág Csurgó / Andrea Temesvári; Christína Papadáki / Christina Zachariadou	6; 4	6; 2

== Romania vs. Hungary ==
Romania
2
La Manga Club, Murcia, Spain
24 April 1996
Red clay (outdoors)

Hungary
1

			1	2	3
1	(Romania) (Hungary)	Cătălina Cristea; Anna Földényi	6; 2	6; 0
2	(Romania) (Hungary)	Ruxandra Dragomir; Andrea Temesvári	6; 1	6; 3
3	(Romania) (Hungary)	Cătălina Cristea / Raluca Sandu; Virág Csurgó / Petra Mandula	6^{7} 7^{9}	1; 6

== Greece vs. Portugal ==
Greece
2
La Manga Club, Murcia, Spain
24 April 1996
Red clay (outdoors)

Portugal
1

			1	2	3
1	(Greece) (Portugal)	Christina Zachariadou; Joana Pedroso	4; 6	6; 3	5; 7
2	(Greece) (Portugal)	Christína Papadáki; Sofia Prazeres	5; 7	7; 5	6; 0
3	(Greece) (Portugal)	Ariadne Katsouli / Christína Papadáki; Joana Pedroso / Sofia Prazeres	6; 2	6; 3

- Portugal placed last in the pool, and thus was relegated to Group II in 1997, where they placed first in their pool of six, and thus advanced back to Group I for 1998.

== See also ==
- Fed Cup structure
