= 1996 Fed Cup Europe/Africa Zone Group I – Knockout Stage =

Tennis tournament knockout stage

The Knockout Stage of the 1996 Fed Cup Europe/Africa Zone Group I was the final stage of the Zonal Competition involving teams from Europe and Africa. Those that qualified for this stage placed first and second in their respective pools.

Placing	Pool A	Pool B	Pool C	Pool D
1	Russia	Italy	Switzerland	Romania
2	Belarus	Sweden	Croatia	Hungary
3	Slovenia	Latvia	Georgia	Greece
4	Great Britain	Norway	Yugoslavia	Portugal

The eight teams were then randomly drawn into two two-stage knockout tournaments, with the winners advancing to the World Group II Play-offs.

== Draw ==
Semifinals
Russia	3
Sweden	0
Hungary	1
Switzerland	2
Italy	0
Belarus	3
Croatia	3
Romania	0

Finals
Russia	1
Switzerland	2
Belarus	1
Croatia	2

=== Semifinals ===
==== Russia vs. Sweden ====
Russia
3
La Manga Club, Murcia, Spain
25 April 1996
Red clay (outdoors)

Sweden
0

			1	2	3
1	(Russia) (Sweden)	Elena Likhovtseva; Åsa Carlsson	6; 4	6; 4
2	(Russia) (Sweden)	Anna Kournikova; Anna-Karin Svensson	6; 0	6; 3
3	(Russia) (Sweden)	Anna Kournikova / Elena Makarova; Åsa Carlsson / Maria Lindström	6; 3	6; 3

==== Hungary vs. Switzerland ====
Hungary
1
La Manga Club, Murcia, Spain
25 April 1996
Red clay (outdoors)

Switzerland
2

			1	2	3
1	(Hungary) (Switzerland)	Anna Földényi; Patty Schnyder	3; 6	6^{5} 7^{7}
2	(Hungary) (Switzerland)	Andrea Temesvári; Martina Hingis	0; 6	3; 6
3	(Hungary) (Switzerland)	Petra Mandula / Andrea Temesvári; Angela Bürgis / Emanuela Zardo	6; 4	6; 2

==== Italy vs. Belarus ====
Italy
0
La Manga Club, Murcia, Spain
25 April 1996
Red clay (outdoors)

Belarus
3

			1	2	3
1	(Italy) (Belarus)	Rita Grande; Natasha Zvereva	6; 4	1; 6	4; 6
2	(Italy) (Belarus)	Adriana Serra Zanetti; Olga Barabanschikova	5; 7	7; 5	1; 6
3	(Italy) (Belarus)	Nathalie Baudone / Laura Golarsa; Olga Barabanschikova / Tatiana Ignatieva	0; 3			retired

==== Croatia vs. Romania ====
Croatia
3
La Manga Club, Murcia, Spain
25 April 1996
Red clay (outdoors)

Romania
0

			1	2	3
1	(Croatia) (Romania)	Mirjana Lučić; Cătălina Cristea	6; 0	6; 4
2	(Croatia) (Romania)	Iva Majoli; Ruxandra Dragomir	6; 2	6; 3
3	(Croatia) (Romania)	Maja Murić / Silvija Talaja; Cătălina Cristea / Raluca Sandu	6; 3	3; 6	7; 5

=== Finals ===
==== Russia vs. Switzerland ====
Russia
1
La Manga Club, Murcia, Spain
26 April 1996
Red clay (outdoors)

Switzerland
2

			1	2	3
1	(Russia) (Switzerland)	Anna Kournikova; Patty Schnyder	4; 6	4; 6
2	(Russia) (Switzerland)	Elena Likhovtseva; Martina Hingis	3; 6	0; 6
3	(Russia) (Switzerland)	Anna Kournikova / Elena Makarova; Angela Bürgis / Emanuela Zardo	7; 5	6; 1

==== Belarus vs. Croatia ====
Belarus
1
La Manga Club, Murcia, Spain
26 April 1996
Red clay (outdoors)

Croatia
2

			1	2	3
1	(Belarus) (Croatia)	Natasha Zvereva; Iva Majoli	1; 6	2; 6
2	(Belarus) (Croatia)	Olga Barabanschikova; Mirjana Lučić	4; 6	6; 2	4; 6
3	(Belarus) (Croatia)	Olga Barabanschikova / Olga Glouschenko; Maja Murić / Silvija Talaja	1; 0			retired

== See also ==
- Fed Cup structure
