= 1995 Fed Cup Europe/Africa Zone Group I – Knockout Stage =

Tennis tournament knockout stage

The Knockout Stage of the 1995 Fed Cup Europe/Africa Zone Group I was the final stage of the Zonal Competition involving teams from Europe and Africa. Those that qualified for this stage placed first and second in their respective pools.

Placing	Pool A	Pool B	Pool C	Pool D
1	Slovenia	Hungary	Belarus	Belgium
2	Czech Republic	Russia	Latvia	Romania
3	Great Britain	Georgia	Switzerland	Croatia
4	Poland	Ukraine	Finland	Israel

The eight teams were then randomly drawn into two two-stage knockout tournaments, with the winners advancing to the World Group II Play-offs.

== Draw ==
Semifinals
Slovenia	0
Czech Republic	3
Russia	1
Belarus	2
Hungary	2
Latvia	1
Romania	0
Belgium	3

Finals
Czech Republic	3
Belarus	0
Hungary	0
Belgium	3

=== Semifinals ===
==== Slovenia vs. Czech Republic ====
Slovenia
0
La Manga Club, Murcia, Spain
20 April 1995
Clay (outdoors)

Czech Republic
3

			1	2	3
1	(Slovenia) (Czech Republic)	Barbara Mulej; Helena Suková	6; 1	4; 6	5; 7
2	(Slovenia) (Czech Republic)	Tina Križan; Jana Novotná	0; 6	5; 7
3	(Slovenia) (Czech Republic)	Tjaša Jezernik / Tina Križan; Radka Bobková / Petra Langrová	4; 6	4; 6

==== Belarus vs. Russia ====
Belarus
2
La Manga Club, Murcia, Spain
20 April 1995
Clay (outdoors)

Russia
1

			1	2	3
1	(Belarus) (Russia)	Tatiana Ignatieva; Eugenia Maniokova	6^{4} 7^{7}	7; 5	3; 6
2	(Belarus) (Russia)	Natasha Zvereva; Elena Likhovtseva	6; 2	6; 4
3	(Belarus) (Russia)	Tatiana Ignatieva / Natasha Zvereva; Elena Makarova / Eugenia Maniokova	6; 2	6; 0

==== Hungary vs. Latvia ====
Hungary
2
La Manga Club, Murcia, Spain
20 April 1995
Clay (outdoors)

Latvia
1

			1	2	3
1	(Hungary) (Latvia)	Petra Mandula; Oksana Bushevitsa	6; 3	1; 6	6; 3
2	(Hungary) (Latvia)	Andrea Temesvári; Larisa Neiland	6; 4	7^{7} 6^{4}
3	(Hungary) (Latvia)	Petra Mandula / Andrea Temesvári; Agnese Blumberga / Oksana Bushevitsa	6^{5} 7^{7}	5; 7

==== Belgium vs. Romania ====
Belgium
3
La Manga Club, Murcia, Spain
20 April 1995
Clay (outdoors)

Romania
0

			1	2	3
1	(Belgium) (Romania)	Laurence Courtois; Cătălina Cristea	7^{7} 6^{4}	6; 3
2	(Belgium) (Romania)	Sabine Appelmans; Ruxandra Dragomir	6; 4	6; 3
3	(Belgium) (Romania)	Els Callens / Nancy Feber; Cătălina Cristea / Ruxandra Dragomir	6; 4	6; 3

=== Finals ===
==== Czech Republic vs. Belarus ====
Czech Republic
3
La Manga Club, Murcia, Spain
21 April 1995
Clay (outdoors)

Belarus
0

			1	2	3
1	(Czech Republic) (Belarus)	Helena Suková; Tatiana Ignatieva	6; 4	6^{7} 7^{9}	6; 3
2	(Czech Republic) (Belarus)	Jana Novotná; Natasha Zvereva	0; 6	7; 5	6; 3
3	(Czech Republic) (Belarus)	Radka Bobková / Petra Langrová; Marina Stets / Vera Zhukovets	6; 0	6; 3

- Czech Republic advanced to the World Group II Play-offs, where they were drawn against Sweden. They won, 4–1, and thus advanced to 1996 World Group II.

==== Hungary vs. Belgium ====
Hungary
0
La Manga Club, Murcia, Spain
21 April 1995
Clay (outdoors)

Belgium
3

			1	2	3
1	(Hungary) (Belgium)	Petra Mandula; Laurence Courtois	4; 6	1; 6
2	(Hungary) (Belgium)	Andrea Temesvári; Sabine Appelmans	4; 6	6; 4	3; 6
3	(Hungary) (Belgium)	Petra Mandula / Andrea Temesvári; Els Callens / Nancy Feber	1; 6	1; 6

- Belgium advanced to the World Group II Play-offs, where they were drawn against South Korea. They won, 3–2, and thus advanced to 1996 World Group II.

== See also ==
- Fed Cup structure
