= Martin Zachary Njeuma =

Cameroonian historian

- Born: 9 April 1940; Buea, Cameroon
- Died: 28 April 2010 (aged 70); Yaoundé, Cameroon
- Education: University of Ghana; University of Paris; School of Oriental and African Studies, University of London
- Occupation: Historian
- Known for: African history
- Notable work: Fulani Hegemony in Yola (Old Adamawa) 1809–1902 (1978)
- Spouse: Dorothy Njeuma
- Children: Christine Njeuma

Martin Zachary Mondinde Njeuma (1940–2010) was a Cameroonian historian in the field of African history, and one of the first formally trained historians from Cameroon. After over a decade studying abroad, he returned to Cameroon in 1970 to work as the Director of the National Archives in Buea and later as a professor at the University of Yaoundé. He was also the Head of the History Department and the Dean of the Faculty of Letters and Human Sciences. He later became the pioneer Dean of the Faculty of Arts at the University of Buea.

== Early life and education ==
On 9 April 1940, Njeuma was born in the city of Buea to Isaac Mase Njeuma and Ma Sophie Mondinde. He was the first of ten siblings.

He attended St. Joseph's College Sasse from 1954 to 1958. Between 1959 and 1960, he studied in King's College in Lagos, Nigeria. He later received his BA in History from the University of Ghana in 1964. From 1965 to 1966, he studied French at the University of Paris. In 1969, he received his PhD in African history from the School of Oriental and African Studies (SOAS) of the University of London. In 1972, he also studied German at the Goethe Institute at Grafin.

== Career ==
After returning to Cameroon in 1970, Njeuma assumed the position of Director of National Archives in Buea. He was later recruited as a professor of history, Head of the History department, and Dean of the faculty of Letters and Human sciences at the University of Yaounde in 1981. He eventually became the first Dean of the Faculty of Arts of the University of Buea. He retired in 1995.

== Honours ==
In 1993, Njeuma was made an honorary foreign member of the American Historical Association "for his manifold services to the history profession" becoming the first and only African scholar to receive this award. He was a recipient of the Fulbright–Hays grant, in 1976, 1984 and 1994, and in 1996 the Rockefeller grant. He was a visiting professor of a number of universities in Europe and the United States. He became influential in the university system in Cameroon.

== Personal life ==
Dorothy Njeuma, also an academic, was Martin's spouse. Among their two children was Christine Njeuma, the first female airline pilot in Central Africa. Christine is also a tennis player, and became the National Champion in Cameroon three years in a row from 1995 to 1997. She also had the opportunity to represent Cameroon in international competitions, including the Billie Jean King Cup. An autobiographical sketch is given in Njeuma 1999
