= Bernard Fonlon =

Cameroonian politician and educationalist (1924–1986)

Bernard Nsokika Fonlon (19 November 1924 – 27 August 1986) was a Cameroonian politician and educationist who worked on the development of bilingualism in Cameroon.

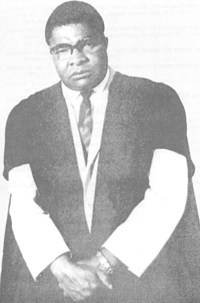

== Early life and education ==
Bernard Fonlon was born on 19 November 1924 at Kumbo Nso in Cameroon. He began his elementary education at Catholic School and Later proceeded to Christ The King College Onitsha, Anambra in 1940 . He further went to Bigard Memorial Seminary in Anambra State, where he studied Philosophy and Theology. He then travelled to Dublin for his Master's in Literature at the University of Ireland Dublin in 1954. He obtained his PhD in Literature at Sorbonne University Paris in 1961

== Career ==
Fonlon started his career as an Assistant Classroom teacher in 1940–1941. He was a committed proponent of Cameroonian reunification, and was later appointed as charge de mission to former Cameroonian President Ahmadou Ahidjo, he was also given an appointment of the Deputy Minister of Foreign Affairs in 1964, Minister of Transportation, Post & Telecommunications in 1968. In 1971, Ahidjo relieved Fonlon of his cabinet position.

In 1972, Fonlon became a Professor of Literature and Head of Department at the University of Younde, Cameroon. Fonlon being an educationist wrote series of books including A Case of Early Bilingualism (1963), Will We Make or Mar (1964), To Every Son of Yusuf Amuda Gobir Nso (1965), Under the Sign of the Rising Sun (1965), and The Task of the Day (1966).

== Later life and death ==
Fonlon was the most influent proponent of bilingualism in Cameroon. Fonlon retired in 1985 and died on 27 August 1986 while on a trip to Canada.

See essays in the festschrift Socrates in Cameroon: The Life and Works of Bernard Nsokika Fonlon edited by Nalova Lyonga (1989) 2010, the entry in Historical Dictionary of the Republic of Cameroon pp. 124–125 and obituaryies by Chilver's and Andrew Kishani.
