= 1997 Fed Cup Europe/Africa Zone Group II – Pool A =

Group A of the 1997 Fed Cup Europe/Africa Zone Group II was one of four pools in the Europe/Africa zone of the 1996 Fed Cup. Six teams competed in a round robin competition, with the top team advancing to Group I for 1998.

	(United Kingdom) GBR	(Denmark) DEN	(Estonia) EST	(Armenia) ARM	(Lithuania) LIT	(Egypt) EGY	Match; W–L	Set; W–L	Game; W–L	Standings
Great Britain		2–1	3–0	3–0	3–0	3–0	5–0	29–3	184–63	1
Denmark	1–2		3–0	3–0	3–0	3–0	4–1	27–6	183–99	2
Estonia	0–3	0–3		2–1	3–0	3–0	3–2	17–16	142–135	3
Armenia	0–3	0–3	1–2		3–0	3–0	2–3	14–16	120–120	4
Lithuania	0–3	0–3	0–3	0–3		3–0	1–4	6–18	72–168	5
Egypt	0–3	0–3	0–3	0–3	0–3		0–5	2–24	54–193	6

== Great Britain vs. Lithuania ==
Great Britain
3
Ali Bey Club, Manavgat, Turkey
5 May 1997
Red clay (outdoors)

Lithuania
0

			1	2	3
1	(United Kingdom) (Lithuania)	Julie Pullin; Indrė Kastanauskaitė	6; 0	6; 0
2	(United Kingdom) (Lithuania)	Samantha Smith; Galina Misiuriova	6; 0	6; 0
3	(United Kingdom) (Lithuania)	Clare Wood / Lorna Woodroffe; Vaida Martinkute / Galina Misiuriova	6; 1	6; 1

== Denmark vs. Armenia ==
Denmark
3
Ali Bey Club, Manavgat, Turkey
5 May 1997
Red clay (outdoors)

Armenia
0

			1	2	3
1	(Denmark) (Armenia)	Eva Dyrberg; Aida Khalatian	7; 5	6; 0
2	(Denmark) (Armenia)	Sofie Albinus; Sona Saringulyan	6; 2	6; 2
3	(Denmark) (Armenia)	Mette Iversen / Maria Rasmussen; Aida Khalatian / Sona Saringulyan	6; 1	6; 4

== Estonia vs. Egypt ==
Estonia
3
Ali Bey Club, Manavgat, Turkey
5 May 1997
Red clay (outdoors)

Egypt
0

			1	2	3
1	(Estonia) (Egypt)	Liina Suurvarik; Yasmin Attia-Abdalla	6; 2	6; 3
2	(Estonia) (Egypt)	Helen Laupa; Marwa El Many	6; 4	6^{3} 7^{7}	6; 3
3	(Estonia) (Egypt)	Helina Lill / Liina Suurvarik; Yasmin Attia-Abdalla / Marwa El Many	6; 1	4; 6	6; 0

== Great Britain vs. Egypt ==
Great Britain
3
Ali Bey Club, Manavgat, Turkey
6 May 1997
Red clay (outdoors)

Egypt
0

			1	2	3
1	(United Kingdom) (Egypt)	Julie Pullin; Yasmin Attia-Abdalla	6; 1	6; 1
2	(United Kingdom) (Egypt)	Samantha Smith; Marwa El Many	6; 1	6; 1
3	(United Kingdom) (Egypt)	Clare Wood / Lorna Woodroffe; Yasmin Attia-Abdalla / Marwa El Many	6; 1	6; 0

== Denmark vs. Estonia ==
Denmark
3
Ali Bey Club, Manavgat, Turkey
6 May 1997
Red clay (outdoors)

Estonia
0

			1	2	3
1	(Denmark) (Estonia)	Eva Dyrberg; Helene Holter	2; 6	6; 4	6; 0
2	(Denmark) (Estonia)	Sofie Albinus; Helina Lill	6; 3	7; 5
3	(Denmark) (Estonia)	Sofie Albinus / Eva Dyrberg; Helen Laupa / Liina Suurvarik	6; 1	6; 1

== Armenia vs. Lithuania ==
Armenia
3
Ali Bey Club, Manavgat, Turkey
6 May 1997
Red clay (outdoors)

Lithuania
0

			1	2	3
1	(Armenia) (Lithuania)	Aida Khalatian; Indrė Kastanauskaitė	6; 2	6; 0
2	(Armenia) (Lithuania)	Sona Saringulyan; Galina Misiuriova	6; 2	6; 3
3	(Armenia) (Lithuania)	Aida Khalatian / Sona Saringulyan; Vaida Martinkute / Galina Misiuriova	6; 0	6; 1

== Great Britain vs. Estonia ==
Great Britain
3
Ali Bey Club, Manavgat, Turkey
7 May 1997
Red clay (outdoors)

Estonia
0

			1	2	3
1	(United Kingdom) (Estonia)	Clare Wood; Liina Suurvarik	6; 3	6; 0
2	(United Kingdom) (Estonia)	Samantha Smith; Helene Holter	6; 3	6; 4
3	(United Kingdom) (Estonia)	Julie Pullin / Lorna Woodroffe; Helene Holter / Liina Suurvarik	6; 0	6; 1

== Denmark vs. Lithuania ==
Denmark
3
Ali Bey Club, Manavgat, Turkey
7 May 1997
Red clay (outdoors)

Lithuania
0

			1	2	3
1	(Denmark) (Lithuania)	Eva Dyrberg; Indrė Kastanauskaitė	6; 1	6; 0
2	(Denmark) (Lithuania)	Sofie Albinus; Galina Misiuriova	6; 2	7; 5
3	(Denmark) (Lithuania)	Eva Dyrberg / Mette Iversen; Vaida Martinkute / Galina Misiuriova	6; 3	6; 1

== Armenia vs. Egypt ==
Armenia
3
Ali Bey Club, Manavgat, Turkey
7 May 1997
Red clay (outdoors)

Egypt
0

			1	2	3
1	(Armenia) (Egypt)	Aida Khalatian; Yasmin Attia-Abdalla	6; 3	6; 0
2	(Armenia) (Egypt)	Sona Saringulyan; Marwa El Many	6; 3	6; 2
3	(Armenia) (Egypt)	Aida Khalatian / Naira Santrosian; Yasmin Attia-Abdalla / Marwa El Many	6; 1	6; 1

== Great Britain vs. Armenia ==
Great Britain
3
Ali Bey Club, Manavgat, Turkey
8 May 1997
Red clay (outdoors)

Armenia
0

			1	2	3
1	(United Kingdom) (Armenia)	Clare Wood; Aida Khalatian	6; 1	6; 2
2	(United Kingdom) (Armenia)	Samantha Smith; Sona Saringulyan	6; 0	6; 3
3	(United Kingdom) (Armenia)	Clare Wood / Lorna Woodroffe; Naira Santrosian / Sona Saringulyan	6; 2	6; 3

== Denmark vs. Egypt ==
Denmark
3
Ali Bey Club, Manavgat, Turkey
8 May 1997
Red clay (outdoors)

Egypt
0

			1	2	3
1	(Denmark) (Egypt)	Eva Dyrberg; Ingy El Taweel	6; 2	6; 1
2	(Denmark) (Egypt)	Sofie Albinus; Dalia El Sheikh	6; 3	6; 3
3	(Denmark) (Egypt)	Mette Iversen / Maria Rasmussen; Yasmin Attia-Abdalla / Marwa El Many	6; 3	6; 1

== Estonia vs. Lithuania ==
Estonia
3
Ali Bey Club, Manavgat, Turkey
8 May 1997
Red clay (outdoors)

Lithuania
0

			1	2	3
1	(Estonia) (Lithuania)	Liina Suurvarik; Vaida Martinkute	6; 0	6; 0
2	(Estonia) (Lithuania)	Helina Lill; Galina Misiuriova	6; 3	7^{7} 6^{3}
3	(Estonia) (Lithuania)	Helene Holter / Helen Laupa; Indrė Kastanauskaitė / Galina Misiuriova	6; 2	6; 0

== Great Britain vs. Estonia ==
Great Britain
2
Ali Bey Club, Manavgat, Turkey
9 May 1997
Red clay (outdoors)

Denmark
1

			1	2	3
1	(United Kingdom) (Denmark)	Clare Wood; Eva Dyrberg	3; 6	6; 4	3; 6
2	(United Kingdom) (Denmark)	Samantha Smith; Sofie Albinus	4; 6	6; 4	6; 2
3	(United Kingdom) (Denmark)	Julie Pullin / Lorna Woodroffe; Sofie Albinus / Eva Dyrberg	6; 4	6; 2

== Estonia vs. Armenia ==
Estonia
2
Ali Bey Club, Manavgat, Turkey
9 May 1997
Red clay (outdoors)

Armenia
1

			1	2	3
1	(Estonia) (Armenia)	Liina Suurvarik; Aida Khalatian	6; 3	6; 1
2	(Estonia) (Armenia)	Helene Holter; Sona Saringulyan	6; 3	6; 4
3	(Estonia) (Armenia)	Helen Laupa / Helina Lill; Aida Khalatian / Sona Saringulyan	3; 6	2; 6

== Lithuania vs. Egypt ==
Lithuania
3
Ali Bey Club, Manavgat, Turkey
9 May 1997
Red clay (outdoors)

Egypt
0

			1	2	3
1	(Lithuania) (Egypt)	Indrė Kastanauskaitė; Dalia El Sheikh	7^{11} 6^{9}	6; 1
2	(Lithuania) (Egypt)	Galina Misiuriova; Marwa El Many	7; 5	6; 3
3	(Lithuania) (Egypt)	Vaida Martinkute / Galina Misiuriova; Yasmin Attia-Abdalla / Marwa El Many	6; 3	7; 5

- Great Britain placed first in the pool, and thus advanced to Group I in 1998, where they placed third in their group of four.

== See also ==
- Fed Cup structure
