= Ministry of Secondary Education (Cameroon) =

Government ministry of Cameroon responsible for secondary education

- Ministère des Enseignements secondaires

Agency overview
- Jurisdiction: Government of Cameroon
- Headquarters: Yaoundé
- Minister responsible: Pauline Nalova Lyonga, Minister of Secondary Education
- Website: www.minesec.gov.cm

The Ministry of Secondary Education (Ministère des Enseignements secondaires), also known as MINESEC, is the government department of Cameroon responsible for secondary education. It is headquartered in Yaoundé, and is one of five central government ministries that share responsibility for education administration in the country.

== Responsibilities ==
The ministry is responsible for designing, implementing, and evaluating government policy in general secondary education, technical and vocational secondary education, and the training of secondary-school teachers. In this capacity, the ministry is tasked with:

- Organizing and ensuring the functioning of general and technical secondary education;
- Designing curricula and teaching methods for general and technical secondary education and supervising their implementation;
- Designing curricula and teaching methods for teachers' training colleges in collaboration with the Ministry of Basic Education;
- Ensuring the moral, civic, and intellectual education of secondary school students in collaboration with the Ministry of Youth Affairs and Civic Education;
- Elaborating and monitoring the implementation of the secondary education school map;
- Elaborating, analyzing, and maintaining secondary education statistics;
- Monitoring and supervising the administrative and pedagogic management of public and private secondary education institutions;
- Implementing the textbook policy for secondary education;
- Monitoring the construction of school buildings and infrastructure for secondary education;
- Managing and ensuring the continuous training of secondary education teaching staff.

The ministry also organizes the country's secondary-school public examinations and maintains liaison with UNESCO for matters within its area of competence.
