= Vera Zhukovets =

Belarusian tennis player

Vera Zhukovets Вера Жукавец
- Country (sports): Belarus
- Born: 20 March 1976 (age 49) Minsk, Soviet Union
- Turned pro: 1993
- Retired: 1999
- Prize money: $24,989

Singles
- Career record: 75–48
- Career titles: 3 ITF
- Highest ranking: 225 (10 July 1995)

Doubles
- Career record: 50–40
- Career titles: 4 ITF
- Highest ranking: 241 (27 April 1998)

Vera Zhukovets (Belarusian: Вера Жукавец; born 20 March 1976) is a former Belarusian tennis player.

Zhukovets won two singles and four doubles titles on the ITF Circuit in her career. On 10 July 1995, she reached her best singles ranking of world No. 225. On 27 April 1998, she peaked at No. 541 in the doubles rankings.

Playing for Belarus Fed Cup team, Zhukovets has a win/loss of 0–4.

== ITF finals ==
$100,000 tournaments
$75,000 tournaments
$50,000 tournaments
$25,000 tournaments
$10,000 tournaments

=== Singles: 6 (3–3) ===
Result	No.	Date	Tournament	Surface	Opponent	Score
Loss	1.	24 October 1994	Odesa, Ukraine	Clay	(Russia) Maria Marfina	2–6, 3–6
Win	2.	31 October 1994	Jūrmala, Latvia	Hard (i)	(Russia) Evgenia Kulikovskaya	6–2, 7–6^{(4)}
Win	3.	8 May 1995	Mollet, Spain	Clay	(Brazil) Patrícia Segala	7–6^{(4)}, 6–1
Loss	4.	22 May 1995	Barcelona, Spain	Hard	(Spain) Gala León García	0–6, 0–6
Win	5.	20 October 1996	Šiauliai, Lithuania	Hard (i)	(Czech Republic) Zuzana Demeterová	6–2, 6–1
Loss	6.	28 October 1996	Jūrmala, Latvia	Carpet (i)	(Russia) Elena Dementieva	2–6, 2–6

=== Doubles: 6 (4–2) ===
Result	No.	Date	Tournament	Surface	Partner	Opponents	Score
Win	1.	6 May 1996	Nitra, Slovakia	Clay	(Bulgaria) Teodora Nedeva	(Slovakia) Zuzana Váleková (Slovakia) Gabriela Voleková	w/o
Win	2.	28 October 1996	Minsk, Belarus	Hard (i)	(Belarus) Nadejda Ostrovskaya	(Belarus) Natalia Nareiko (Russia) Dasha Ovsiannikova	6–3, 7–6^{(10)}
Win	3.	25 August 1997	Kyiv, Ukraine	Clay	(Belarus) Nadejda Ostrovskaya	(Russia) Irina Kornienko (Latvia) Elena Krutko	6–1, 6–3
Loss	4.	5 October 1997	Tbilisi, Georgia	Clay	(Ukraine) Anna Zaporozhanova	(Russia) Elena Dementieva (Russia) Anastasia Myskina	6–3, 0–6, 4–6
Loss	5.	13 October 1997	Šiauliai, Lithuania	Carpet (i)	(Belarus) Nadejda Ostrovskaya	(Belarus) Olga Glouschenko (Belarus) Tatiana Poutchek	5–7, 3–6
Win	6.	20 October 1997	Jūrmala, Latvia	Carpet (i)	(Belarus) Nadejda Ostrovskaya	(Ukraine) Natalia Bondarenko (Belarus) Marina Stets	3–6, 6–3, 6–4

== Fed Cup participation ==
=== Doubles ===
Edition	Stage	Date	Location	Against	Surface	Partner	Opponents	W/L	Score
1994 Fed Cup	E/A Zone k/o stage	22 April 1994	Bad Waltersdorf, Austria	Portugal	Clay	(Belarus) Marina Stets	(Portugal) Joana Pedroso (Portugal) Sofia Prazeres	L	2–6, 2–6
1995 Fed Cup	E/A Zone Group I	18 April 1995	Murcia, Spain	Latvia	Clay	(Belarus) Marina Stets	(Latvia) Agnese Blumberga (Latvia) Oksana Bushevitsa	L	4–6, 6–3, 5–7
1995 Fed Cup	E/A Zone Group I	19 April 1995	Murcia, Spain	Switzerland	Clay	(Belarus) Marina Stets	(Switzerland) Martina Hingis (Switzerland) Joana Manta	L	1–6, 1–6
1995 Fed Cup	E/A Zone k/o stage	21 April 1995	Murcia, Spain	Czech Republic	Clay	(Belarus) Marina Stets	(Czech Republic) Radka Bobková (Czech Republic) Petra Langrová	L	0–6, 3–6
