= 1996 Fed Cup Europe/Africa Zone Group II – Pool D =

International tennis competition

Group D of the 1996 Fed Cup Europe/Africa Zone Group II was one of four pools in the Europe/Africa zone of the 1996 Fed Cup. Four teams competed in a round robin competition, with the top two teams advancing to the play-offs.

| | (Ukraine) UKR | (Denmark) DEN | (Republic of Ireland) IRL | (Malta) MLT | (Iceland) ISL | Match; W–L | Set; W–L | Game; W–L | Standings |
| Ukraine | | 3–0 | 2–1 | 3–0 | 3–0 | 4–0 | 22–3 | 138–58 | 1 |
| Denmark | 0–3 | | 2–1 | 3–0 | 3–0 | 3–1 | 17–9 | 131–85 | 2 |
| Ireland | 1–2 | 1–2 | | 3–0 | 3–0 | 2–2 | 17–9 | 129–100 | 3 |
| Malta | 0–3 | 0–3 | 0–3 | | 3–0 | 1–3 | 7–18 | 88–124 | 4 |
| Iceland | 0–3 | 0–3 | 0–3 | 0–3 | | 0–4 | 0–24 | 22–144 | 5 |

== Denmark vs. Ireland ==
Denmark
2
Ramat HaSharon, Israel
25 March 1996
Hard (outdoors)

Ireland
1

| | | | 1 | 2 | 3 |
|---|---|---|---|---|---|
| 1 | (Denmark) (Republic of Ireland) | Karin Ptaszek; Gina Niland | 4; 6 | 3; 6 |
| 2 | (Denmark) (Republic of Ireland) | Sandra Olsen; Lesley O'Halloran | 6; 1 | 4; 6 | 6; 4 |
| 3 | (Denmark) (Republic of Ireland) | Sandra Olsen / Tine Scheuer-Larsen; Gina Niland / Lesley O'Halloran | 6; 2 | 6; 2 |

== Malta vs. Iceland ==
Malta
3
Ramat HaSharon, Israel
25 March 1996
Hard (outdoors)

Iceland
0

| | | | 1 | 2 | 3 |
|---|---|---|---|---|---|
| 1 | (Malta) (Iceland) | Lisa Camenzuli; Hrafuhildur Hannesdóttir | 6; 4 | 6; 2 |
| 2 | (Malta) (Iceland) | Helen Asciak; Stefanía Stefánsdóttir | 6; 0 | 6; 0 |
| 3 | (Malta) (Iceland) | Helen Asciak / Lisa Camenzuli; Hrafuhildur Hannesdóttir / Stefanía Stefánsdóttir | 6; 1 | 6; 0 |

== Ukraine vs. Ireland ==
Ukraine
2
Ramat HaSharon, Israel
26 March 1996
Hard (outdoors)

Ireland
1

| | | | 1 | 2 | 3 |
|---|---|---|---|---|---|
| 1 | (Ukraine) (Republic of Ireland) | Elena Tatarkova; Gina Niland | 6; 4 | 6; 2 |
| 2 | (Ukraine) (Republic of Ireland) | Elena Brioukhovets; Claire Curran | 6; 2 | 6; 2 |
| 3 | (Ukraine) (Republic of Ireland) | Tatiana Kovalchuk / Anna Zaporozhanova; Lesley O'Halloran / Philippa Palmer | 3; 6 | 1; 6 |

== Denmark vs. Malta ==
Denmark
3
Ramat HaSharon, Israel
26 March 1996
Hard (outdoors)

Malta
0

| | | | 1 | 2 | 3 |
|---|---|---|---|---|---|
| 1 | (Denmark) (Malta) | Sandra Olsen; Helen Asciak | 6; 2 | 6; 1 |
| 2 | (Denmark) (Malta) | Charlotte Aagaard; Lisa Camenzuli | 7^{7} 6^{1} | 6; 2 |
| 3 | (Denmark) (Malta) | Charlotte Aagaard / Karin Ptaszek; Helen Asciak / Lisa Camenzuli | 6; 3 | 6; 1 |

== Ukraine vs. Denmark ==
Ukraine
3
Ramat HaSharon, Israel
27 March 1996
Hard (outdoors)

Denmark
0

| | | | 1 | 2 | 3 |
|---|---|---|---|---|---|
| 1 | (Ukraine) (Denmark) | Elena Tatarkova; Karin Ptaszek | 2; 6 | 6; 4 | 6; 4 |
| 2 | (Ukraine) (Denmark) | Elena Brioukhovets; Charlotte Aagaard | 6; 1 | 6; 4 |
| 3 | (Ukraine) (Denmark) | Elena Brioukhovets / Elena Tatarkova; Charlotte Aagaard / Karin Ptaszek | 6; 2 | 6; 2 |

== Ireland vs. Iceland ==
Ireland
3
Ramat HaSharon, Israel
27 March 1996
Hard (outdoors)

Iceland
0

| | | | 1 | 2 | 3 |
|---|---|---|---|---|---|
| 1 | (Republic of Ireland) (Iceland) | Claire Curran; Hrafuhildur Hannesdóttir | 6; 0 | 6; 2 |
| 2 | (Republic of Ireland) (Iceland) | Lesley O'Halloran; Stefanía Stefánsdóttir | 6; 1 | 6; 4 |
| 3 | (Republic of Ireland) (Iceland) | Lesley O'Halloran / Philippa Palmer; Hrafuhildur Hannesdóttir / Iris Staub | 6; 0 | 6; 1 |

== Ukraine vs. Iceland ==
Ukraine
3
Ramat HaSharon, Israel
28 March 1996
Hard (outdoors)

Iceland
0

| | | | 1 | 2 | 3 |
|---|---|---|---|---|---|
| 1 | (Ukraine) (Iceland) | Elena Tatarkova; Hrafuhildur Hannesdóttir | 6; 0 | 6; 0 |
| 2 | (Ukraine) (Iceland) | Anna Zaporozhanova; Iris Staub | 6; 0 | 6; 0 |
| 3 | (Ukraine) (Iceland) | Tatiana Kovalchuk / Anna Zaporozhanova; Kristín Gunnarsdóttir / Stefanía Stefánsdóttir | 6; 1 | 6; 4 |

== Ireland vs. Malta ==
Ireland
3
Ramat HaSharon, Israel
28 March 1996
Hard (outdoors)

Malta
0

| | | | 1 | 2 | 3 |
|---|---|---|---|---|---|
| 1 | (Republic of Ireland) (Malta) | Claire Curran; Helen Asciak | 6; 3 | 6; 1 |
| 2 | (Republic of Ireland) (Malta) | Gina Niland; Lisa Camenzuli | 7^{7} 6^{2} | 6; 5 |
| 3 | (Republic of Ireland) (Malta) | Lesley O'Halloran / Philippa Palmer; Helen Asciak / Lisa Camenzuli | 6^{3} 7^{7} | 6; 4 | 6; 3 |

== Ukraine vs. Malta ==
Ukraine
3
Ramat HaSharon, Israel
29 March 1996
Hard (outdoors)

Malta
0

| | | | 1 | 2 | 3 |
|---|---|---|---|---|---|
| 1 | (Ukraine) (Malta) | Elena Tatarkova; Lisa Camenzuli | 6; 2 | 6; 3 |
| 2 | (Ukraine) (Malta) | Tatiana Kovalchuk; Sarah Wetz | 6; 1 | 6; 1 |
| 3 | (Ukraine) (Malta) | Elena Brioukhovets / Elena Tatarkova; Helen Asciak / Lisa Camenzuli | 6; 1 | 6; 0 |

== Denmark vs. Iceland ==
Denmark
3
Ramat HaSharon, Israel
29 March 1996
Hard (outdoors)

Iceland
0

| | | | 1 | 2 | 3 |
|---|---|---|---|---|---|
| 1 | (Denmark) (Iceland) | Karin Ptaszek; Hrafuhildur Hannesdóttir | 6; 4 | 6; 2 |
| 2 | (Denmark) (Iceland) | Sandra Olsen; Stefanía Stefánsdóttir | 6; 0 | 6; 0 |
| 3 | (Denmark) (Iceland) | Karin Ptaszek / Tine Scheuer-Larsen; Hrafuhildur Hannesdóttir / Stefanía Stefánsdóttir | 6; 1 | 6; 0 |

== See also ==
- Fed Cup structure
