= Marina Stets =

Belarusian tennis player

Marina Stets Марына Стец
- Full name: Marina Nikolaevna Stets
- Country (sports): Belarus
- Born: 21 February 1973 (age 52) Minsk, Soviet Union
- Prize money: $17,589

Singles
- Career record: 64–39
- Career titles: 1 ITF
- Highest ranking: No. 403 (19 June 1995)

Doubles
- Career record: 78–31
- Career titles: 10 ITF
- Highest ranking: No. 220 (18 September 1995)

Marina Nikolaevna Stets (Belarusian: Марына Мікалаеўна Сцец; born 21 February 1973) is a Belarusian former tennis player.

In her career, Stets won one singles title and ten doubles titles on the ITF Women's Circuit. On 19 June 1995, she reached her best singles ranking of world No. 403. On 18 September 1995, she peaked at No. 220 in the doubles rankings.

Stets appeared four times for the Belarus Fed Cup team, losing each match.

== ITF finals ==
=== Singles (1–2) ===
Legend $25,000 tournaments $10,000 tournaments	Finals by surface Clay (0–1) Carpet (1–1)

Result	No.	Date	Tournament	Surface	Opponent	Score
Loss	1.	5 September 1994	Varna, Bulgaria	Clay	(Luxembourg) Anne Kremer	7–6^{(7–5)}, 6–7^{(4–7)}, 1–6
Win	1.	13 October 1997	Šiauliai, Lithuania	Carpet (i)	(Belarus) Nadejda Ostrovskaya	6–3, 4–6, 6–1
Loss	2.	26 October 1998	Minsk, Belarus	Carpet (i)	(Belarus) Nadejda Ostrovskaya	1–6, 1–6

=== Doubles (10–6) ===
Legend $50,000 tournaments $25,000 tournaments $10,000 tournaments	Finals by surface Hard (2–4) Clay (5–0) Carpet (3–2)

Result	No.	Date	Tournament	Surface	Partner	Opponents	Score
Loss	1.	11 October 1993	Moscow, Russia	Hard (i)	(Belarus) Natalia Noreiko	(Russia) Jana Dorodnova (Ukraine) Natalia Nemchinova	7–6^{(7–5)}, 2–6, 3–6
Win	1.	3 October 1994	Kyiv, Ukraine	Clay	(Belarus) Natalia Noreiko	(Ukraine) Natalia Biletskaya (Ukraine) Elena Tatarkova	2–6, 7–5, 6–3
Win	2.	10 October 1994	Odesa, Ukraine	Clay (i)	(Belarus) Natalia Noreiko	(Ukraine) Natalia Biletskaya (Ukraine) Natalia Bondarenko	7–6, 4–6, 6–4
Win	3.	17 October 1994	Moscow, Russia	Hard (i)	(Belarus) Natalia Noreiko	(Russia) Margarita Amelina (Russia) Nadia Streltsova	6–0, 6–0
Win	4.	31 October 1994	Jūrmala, Latvia	Hard (i)	(Belarus) Natalia Noreiko	(Finland) Linda Jansson (Sweden) Anna-Karin Svensson	6–1, 7–5
Win	5.	10 July 1995	Olsztyn, Poland	Clay	(Ukraine) Natalia Nemchinova	(Poland) Katarzyna Malec (Poland) Katarzyna Teodorowicz	6–2, 6–2
Win	6.	25 September 1995	Kyiv, Ukraine	Clay	(Ukraine) Natalia Bondarenko	(Ukraine) Talina Beiko (Ukraine) Tanja Tsiganii	6–1, 6–4
Loss	2.	2 October 1995	Šiauliai, Lithuania	Hard	(Belarus) Natalia Noreiko	(Russia) Natalia Egorova (Russia) Maria Marfina	6–2, 3–6, 6–7^{(4–7)}
Loss	3.	9 October 1995	Jūrmala, Latvia	Hard (i)	(Belarus) Natalia Noreiko	(Ukraine) Natalia Biletskaya (Ukraine) Natalia Bondarenko	5–7, 1–6
Loss	4.	30 October 1995	Moscow, Russia	Hard (i)	(Belarus) Natalia Noreiko	(Russia) Anna Linkova (Ukraine) Natalia Nemchinova	2–6, 6–2, 3–6
Win	7.	20 May 1996	Olsztyn, Poland	Clay	(Ukraine) Natalia Nemchinova	(Germany) Cornelia Grünes (Australia) Loretta Sheales	0–6, 6–0, 7–5
Win	8.	14 October 1996	Šiauliai, Lithuania	Carpet (i)	(Ukraine) Natalia Bondarenko	(Poland) Katarzyna Teodorowicz (Poland) Anna Żarska	6–1, 6–4
Loss	5.	21 October 1996	Jūrmala, Latvia	Carpet (i)	(Ukraine) Natalia Bondarenko	(Czech Republic) Helena Fremuthová (Czech Republic) Blanka Kumbárová	6–0, 6–7^{(1–7)}, 3–6
Loss	6.	20 October 1997	Jūrmala, Latvia	Carpet (i)	(Ukraine) Natalia Bondarenko	(Belarus) Nadejda Ostrovskaya (Belarus) Vera Zhukovets	6–3, 3–6, 4–6
Win	9.	27 October 1997	Minsk, Belarus	Carpet (i)	(Belarus) Antonina Grib	(Latvia) Elena Krutko (Estonia) Helen Laupa	6–2, 6–1
Win	10.	25 October 1999	Minsk, Belarus	Carpet (i)	(Belarus) Tatiana Poutchek	(Czech Republic) Jana Macurová (Czech Republic) Gabriela Navrátilová	6–4, 6–2

== Fed Cup participation ==
=== Doubles ===
Edition	Stage	Date	Location	Against	Surface	Partner	Opponents	W/L	Score
1994 Fed Cup	E/A Zone k/o stage	22 April 1994	Bad Waltersdorf, Austria	Portugal	Clay	(Belarus) Vera Zhukovets	(Portugal) Joana Pedroso (Portugal) Sofia Prazeres	L	2–6, 2–6
1995 Fed Cup	E/A Zone Group I	18 April 1995	Murcia, Spain	Latvia	Clay	(Belarus) Vera Zhukovets	(Latvia) Agnese Blumberga (Latvia) Oksana Bushevitsa	L	4–6, 6–3, 5–7
1995 Fed Cup	E/A Zone Group I	19 April 1995	Murcia, Spain	Switzerland	Clay	(Belarus) Vera Zhukovets	(Switzerland) Martina Hingis (Switzerland) Joana Manta	L	1–6, 1–6
1995 Fed Cup	E/A Zone k/o stage	21 April 1995	Murcia, Spain	Czech Republic	Clay	(Belarus) Vera Zhukovets	(Czech Republic) Radka Bobková (Czech Republic) Petra Langrová	L	0–6, 3–6
