= 1997 Fed Cup Europe/Africa Zone Group II – Pool C =

International tennis competition

Group C of the 1997 Fed Cup Europe/Africa Zone Group II was one of four pools in the Europe/Africa zone of the 1996 Fed Cup. Six teams competed in a round robin competition, with the top team advancing to Group I for 1998.

	(Portugal) POR	(Turkey) TUR	(Bosnia and Herzegovina) BIH	(Norway) NOR	(San Marino) SMR	(Ethiopia) ETH	Match; W–L	Set; W–L	Game; W–L	Standings
Portugal		3–0	3–0	3–0	3–0	3–0	5–0	28–3	177–72	1
Turkey	0–3		2–1	2–1	2–1	3–0	4–1	22–10	168–101	2
Bosnia and Herzegovina	0–3	1–2		2–1	2–1	3–0	3–2	16–16	143–122	3
Norway	0–3	1–2	1–2		2–1	2–1	2–3	14–17	147–132	4
San Marino	0–3	1–2	1–2	1–2		3–0	1–4	14–20	116–149	5
Ethiopia	0–3	0–3	0–3	1–2	0–3		0–5	0–28	5–168	6

== Portugal vs. Ethiopia ==
Portugal
3
Ali Bey Club, Manavgat, Turkey
5 May 1997
Red clay (outdoors)

Ethiopia
0

			1	2	3
1	(Portugal) (Ethiopia)	Ana Gaspar; Metasebeya Temesgen	6; 0	6; 0
2	(Portugal) (Ethiopia)	Joana Pedroso; Senait Gebreail	6; 1	6; 0
3	(Portugal) (Ethiopia)	Ana Catarina Nogueira / Joana Pedroso; Senait Gebreail / Tsedey Kifle	6; 0	6; 0

== Turkey vs. San Marino ==
Turkey
2
Ali Bey Club, Manavgat, Turkey
5 May 1997
Red clay (outdoors)

San Marino
1

			1	2	3
1	(Turkey) (San Marino)	Duygu Akşit Oal; Laura Gatti	6; 0	6; 0
2	(Turkey) (San Marino)	Gülberk Gültekin; Francesca Guardigli	6; 2	6^{6} 7^{8}	4; 6
3	(Turkey) (San Marino)	Duygu Akşit Oal / Gülberk Gültekin; Laura Gatti / Francesca Guardigli	6; 1	6; 2

== Bosnia and Herzegovina vs. Norway ==
Bosnia and Herzegovina
2
Ali Bey Club, Manavgat, Turkey
5 May 1997
Red clay (outdoors)

Norway
1

			1	2	3
1	(Bosnia and Herzegovina) (Norway)	Eldina Fazlić; Line Ullring	3; 6	6; 2	6; 2
2	(Bosnia and Herzegovina) (Norway)	Mervana Jugić-Salkić; Tina Samara	6; 2	6; 4
3	(Bosnia and Herzegovina) (Norway)	Medina Bajrambašić / Eldina Fazlić; Tina Samara / Line Ullring	4; 6	4; 6

== Portugal vs. Norway ==
Portugal
3
Ali Bey Club, Manavgat, Turkey
6 May 1997
Red clay (outdoors)

Norway
0

			1	2	3
1	(Portugal) (Norway)	Ana Gaspar; Line Ullring	6; 3	6; 0
2	(Portugal) (Norway)	Sofia Prazeres; Tina Samara	6; 2	6; 2
3	(Portugal) (Norway)	Ana Catarina Nogueira / Joana Pedroso; Tina Samara / Line Ullring	7; 5	6; 3

== Turkey vs. Bosnia and Herzegovina ==
Turkey
2
Ali Bey Club, Manavgat, Turkey
6 May 1997
Red clay (outdoors)

Bosnia and Herzegovina
1

			1	2	3
1	(Turkey) (Bosnia and Herzegovina)	Duygu Akşit Oal; Eldina Fazlić	6; 4	6; 1
2	(Turkey) (Bosnia and Herzegovina)	Gülberk Gültekin; Mervana Jugić-Salkić	4; 6	7; 5	3; 6
3	(Turkey) (Bosnia and Herzegovina)	Duygu Akşit Oal / Gülberk Gültekin; Eldina Fazlić / Mervana Jugić-Salkić	6; 3	6; 2

== San Marino vs. Ethiopia ==
San Marino
3
Ali Bey Club, Manavgat, Turkey
6 May 1997
Red clay (outdoors)

Ethiopia
0

			1	2	3
1	(San Marino) (Ethiopia)	Laura Gatti; Tsedey Kifle	6; 0	6; 0
2	(San Marino) (Ethiopia)	Francesca Guardigli; Senait Gebreail	6; 0	6; 1
3	(San Marino) (Ethiopia)	Laura Gatti / Francesca Guardigli; Senait Gebreail / Metasebeya Temesgen	6; 0	6; 0

== Portugal vs. Bosnia and Herzegovina ==
Portugal
3
Ali Bey Club, Manavgat, Turkey
7 May 1997
Red clay (outdoors)

Bosnia and Herzegovina
0

			1	2	3
1	(Portugal) (Bosnia and Herzegovina)	Ana Gaspar; Eldina Fazlić	7; 5	7^{9} 6^{7}
2	(Portugal) (Bosnia and Herzegovina)	Sofia Prazeres; Mervana Jugić-Salkić	6; 1	6; 0
3	(Portugal) (Bosnia and Herzegovina)	Joana Pedroso / Sofia Prazeres; Medina Bajrambašić / Harisa Delić	6; 2	6; 2

== Turkey vs. Ethiopia ==
Turkey
3
Ali Bey Club, Manavgat, Turkey
7 May 1997
Red clay (outdoors)

Ethiopia
0

			1	2	3
1	(Turkey) (Ethiopia)	Stela Penciu; Tsedey Kifle	6; 0	6; 0
2	(Turkey) (Ethiopia)	Gülberk Gültekin; Senait Gebreail	6; 0	6; 0
3	(Turkey) (Ethiopia)	Seden Özlü / Stela Penciu; Senait Gebreail / Tsedey Kifle	6; 0	6; 1

== Norway vs. San Marino ==
Norway
2
Ali Bey Club, Manavgat, Turkey
7 May 1997
Red clay (outdoors)

San Marino
1

			1	2	3
1	(Norway) (San Marino)	Line Ullring; Laura Gatti	6; 1	6; 0
2	(Norway) (San Marino)	Tina Samara; Francesca Guardigli	6; 2	6^{5} 7^{7}	2; 6
3	(Norway) (San Marino)	Marianne Bakken / Tina Samara; Laura Gatti / Francesca Guardigli	6; 3	6; 3

== Portugal vs. San Marino ==
Portugal
3
Ali Bey Club, Manavgat, Turkey
8 May 1997
Red clay (outdoors)

San Marino
0

			1	2	3
1	(Portugal) (San Marino)	Ana Gaspar; Laura Gatti	6; 0	6; 2
2	(Portugal) (San Marino)	Sofia Prazeres; Francesca Guardigli	6; 3	1; 6	6; 3
3	(Portugal) (San Marino)	Ana Catarina Nogueira / Joana Pedroso; Laura Gatti / Francesca Guardigli	6; 1	4; 6	6; 3

== Turkey vs. Norway ==
Turkey
2
Ali Bey Club, Manavgat, Turkey
8 May 1997
Red clay (outdoors)

Norway
1

			1	2	3
1	(Turkey) (Norway)	Duygu Akşit Oal; Line Ullring	4; 6	6; 4	3; 6
2	(Turkey) (Norway)	Gülberk Gültekin; Tina Samara	7^{7} 6^{4}	6; 3
3	(Turkey) (Norway)	Duygu Akşit Oal / Gülberk Gültekin; Marianne Bakken / Tina Samara	6; 3	6; 2

== Bosnia and Herzegovina vs. Ethiopia ==
Bosnia and Herzegovina
3
Ali Bey Club, Manavgat, Turkey
8 May 1997
Red clay (outdoors)

Ethiopia
0

			1	2	3
1	(Bosnia and Herzegovina) (Ethiopia)	Harisa Delić; Metasebeya Temesgen	6; 0	6; 0
2	(Bosnia and Herzegovina) (Ethiopia)	Mervana Jugić-Salkić; Senait Gebreail	6; 1	6; 0
3	(Bosnia and Herzegovina) (Ethiopia)	Medina Bajrambašić / Harisa Delić; Senait Gebreail / Tsedey Kifle	6; 1	6; 0

== Bosnia and Herzegovina vs. San Marino ==
Bosnia and Herzegovina
2
Ali Bey Club, Manavgat, Turkey
9 May 1997
Red clay (outdoors)

San Marino
1

			1	2	3
1	(Bosnia and Herzegovina) (San Marino)	Eldina Fazlić; Laura Gatti	6; 0	6; 0
2	(Bosnia and Herzegovina) (San Marino)	Mervana Jugić-Salkić; Francesca Guardigli	2; 6	3; 6
3	(Bosnia and Herzegovina) (San Marino)	Eldina Fazlić / Mervana Jugić-Salkić; Laura Gatti / Francesca Guardigli	6; 2	6; 2

== Norway vs. Ethiopia ==
Norway
2
Ali Bey Club, Manavgat, Turkey
9 May 1997
Red clay (outdoors)

Ethiopia
1

			1	2	3
1	(Norway) (Ethiopia)	Marianne Bakken; Metasebeya Temesgen	6; 0	6; 0
2	(Norway) (Ethiopia)	Line Ullring; Senait Gebreail	6; 0	6; 0
3	(Norway) (Ethiopia)	Marianne Bakken / Line Ullring; Senait Gebreail / Metasebeya Temesgen				w/o

== Portugal vs. Turkey ==
Portugal
3
Ali Bey Club, Manavgat, Turkey
10 May 1997
Red clay (outdoors)

Turkey
0

			1	2	3
1	(Portugal) (Turkey)	Ana Gaspar; Duygu Akşit Oal	1; 6	6; 3	6; 0
2	(Portugal) (Turkey)	Sofia Prazeres; Gülberk Gültekin	6; 3	6; 4
3	(Portugal) (Turkey)	Ana Gaspar / Sofia Prazeres; Duygu Akşit Oal / Gülberk Gültekin				w/o

- Portugal placed first in the pool, and thus advanced to Group I in 1998, where they placed second in their group of four.

== See also ==
- Fed Cup structure
