= René Jam Afane =

Cameroonian educator (c.1910–1981)

- Born: c. 1910
- Died: 19 March 1981
- Education: École Normale de Foulassi
- Children: André Ze Jam Afane

René Jam Afane (c. 1910 – 19 March 1981) was a Cameroonian educator. He is known for writing the lyrics of the Chant de Ralliement, the national anthem of Cameroon, in 1928, at the École Normale de Foulassi, with Samuel Minkyo Bamba, from the same class, who composed the music.

Born c. 1910, Afane was of modest background and pursued teaching as his profession, René Jam Afane studied at Foulassi in the South region from 1922 to 1924, and from 1925 to 1928, before teaching there in 1929. He transitioned from private to public teaching in 1933, first at the regional school in Dschang, then in 1937 at Sangmélima, before being posted to Ambam, then Ebolowa in 1943, where he met Ferdinand Oyono.

Afane was a candidate in the 1952 elections for the Territorial Assembly of Cameroon, representing the Dja-et-Lobo constituency. In 1953, he participated in a four-month training course at the teacher training school in Saint-Cloud, Rouen.

Afane's son, André Ze Jam Afane, also known by the pseudonym Bulu Fulassi, is a musician and storyteller.

Afane is known for writing the lyrics of the Chant de Ralliement, the national anthem of Cameroon, in 1928, based on suggestions from his fellow students at the École Normale de Foulassi. He was particularly taught by Camille Chazeaud. He worked with Samuel Minkyo Bamba, from the same class, composed the music for the Cameroon National anthem.

Afane was awarded the First Class Cameroonian Merit.
