= 1997 Fed Cup Europe/Africa Zone =

Subsection of tennis competition

The Europe/Africa Zone was one of three zones of regional competition in the 1997 Fed Cup.

== Group I ==
- Venue: Bari T.C., Bari, Italy (outdoor clay)
- Date: 22–26 April

The fifteen teams were divided into three pools of four and one pool of three teams. The top teams of each pool play-off in a two-round knockout stage to decide which nation progresses to World Group II play-offs. The two nations winning the least rubbers were relegated to Europe/Africa Zone Group II for 1998.

=== Pools ===
	Pool A	RUS	GRE	BUL
1	Russia (2–0)		3–0	2–1
2	Greece (1–1)	0–3		2–1
3	Bulgaria (0–2)	1–2	1–2	

	Pool B	ITA	SWE	ROU	UKR
1	Italy (3–0)		3–0	2–1	3–0
2	Sweden (2–1)	0–3		3–0	2–1
3	Romania (1–2)	1–2	0–3		3–0
4	Ukraine (0–3)	0–3	1–2	0–3	

	Pool C	BLR	HUN	POL	FIN
1	Belarus (3–0)		2–1	3–0	3–0
2	Hungary (2–1)	1–2		3–0	3–0
3	Poland (1–2)	0–3	0–3		3–0
4	Finland (0–3)	0–3	0–3	0–3	

	Pool D	SLO	ISR	LAT	GEO
1	Slovenia (3–0)		3–0	3–0	3–0
2	Israel (2–1)	0–3		2–1	3–0
3	Latvia (1–2)	0–3	1–2		3–0
4	Georgia (0–3)	0–3	0–3	0–3	

=== Knockout stage ===
Semifinals
Russia	2
Israel	1
Sweden	1
Belarus	2
Italy	3
Greece	0
Hungary	2
Slovenia	1

Finals
Russia	3
Belarus	0
Italy	2
Hungary	1

- Russia and Italy advanced to World Group II Play-offs.
- Finland and Georgia relegated to Group II in 1998.

== Group II ==
- Venue: Ali Bey Club, Manavgat, Turkey (outdoor clay)
- Date: 5–11 May

The twenty-five teams were divided into three pools of six and one pool of seven. The top teams from each pool advanced to Group I for 1998.

=== Pools ===
	Pool A	GBR	DEN	EST	ARM	LIT	EGY
1	Great Britain (5–0)		2–1	3–0	3–0	3–0	3–0
2	Denmark (4–1)	1–2		3–0	3–0	3–0	3–0
3	Estonia (3–2)	0–3	0–3		2–1	3–0	3–0
4	Armenia (2–3)	0–3	0–3	1–2		3–0	3–0
5	Lithuania (1–4)	0–3	0–3	0–3	0–3		3–0
6	Egypt (0–5)	0–3	0–3	0–3	0–3	0–3	

	Pool B	YUG	IRL	TUN	ALG	CMR	ISL
1	Yugoslavia (5–0)		3–0	3–0	3–0	3–0	3–0
2	Ireland (4–1)	0–3		2–1	2–1	3–0	3–0
3	Tunisia (3–2)	0–3	1–2		2–1	3–0	3–0
4	Algeria (2–3)	0–3	1–2	1–2		3–0	3–0
5	Cameroon (1–4)	0–3	0–3	0–3	0–3		2–1
6	Iceland (0–5)	0–3	0–3	0–3	0–3	1–2	

	Pool C	POR	TUR	BIH	NOR	SMR	ETH
1	Portugal (5–0)		3–0	3–0	3–0	3–0	3–0
2	Turkey (4–1)	0–3		2–1	2–1	2–1	3–0
3	Bosnia and Herzegovina (3–2)	0–3	1–2		2–1	2–1	3–0
4	Norway (2–3)	0–3	1–2	1–2		2–1	2–1
5	San Marino (1–4)	0–3	1–2	1–2	1–2		3–0
6	Ethiopia (0–5)	0–3	0–3	0–3	1–2	0–3	

	Pool D	MAD	MLT	LUX	MKD	LIE	BOT	CYP
1	Madagascar (6–0)		2–1	2–1	3–0	3–0	3–0	3–0
2	Malta (5–1)	1–2		2–1	3–0	3–0	3–0	3–0
3	Luxembourg (4–2)	1–2	1–2		2–1	3–0	2–1	3–0
4	Macedonia (3–3)	0–3	0–3	1–2		3–0	3–0	3–0
5	Liechtenstein (2–4)	0–3	0–3	0–3	0–3		3–0	2–1
6	Botswana (1–5)	0–3	0–3	1–2	0–3	0–3		2–1
7	Cyprus (0–6)	0–3	0–3	0–3	0–3	1–2	1–2	

- Great Britain, Yugoslavia, Portugal and Madagascar advanced to Group I in 1998.

== See also ==
- Fed Cup structure
