= Ministry of Basic Education (Cameroon) =

The Ministry of Basic Education (French: Ministère de l'Éducation de base), known by its French acronym MINEDUB, is a Cameroonian government's organization responsible for nursery and primary education.

== History ==
The Ministry of Basic Education was created by Presidential Decree No. 2005/140 of April 25, 2005, which established the ministry to specifically oversee the basic education subsector. Prior to this, basic education was managed under the broader Ministry of National Education. The creation of MINEDUB was as a result of the reorganization of the education education sector, separating basic education from secondary and higher education administration. The internal organization of the ministry was later formalized and updated by Decree No. 2012/268 of June 11, 2012, which dictates the current structure of the central and decentralized services.

MINEDUB's Education Reform Support Project is supported by the World Bank which aims to improve the quality of teaching in public primary schools.

== Roles and responsibilities ==
MINEDUB is responsible for the development and implementation of government policy regarding basic education in Cameroon. Its mandate covers both nursery and primary schooling across the public and private education systems. The ministry's core duties include:

- Designing, implementing, and evaluating national curricula for nursery and primary schools.
- Managing the recruitment, training, and deployment of basic education teachers.
- Overseeing the construction and maintenance of public school infrastructure.
- Organizing and conducting national examinations at the end of the primary education cycle, such as the Certificat d'Études Primaires et Élémentaires (CEPE) and the First School Leaving Certificate (FSLC).

== See also ==
- Education in Cameroon
