= Geraldine Dondit =

Swiss tennis player

- Country (sports): Switzerland
- Born: 13 April 1976 (age 49)
- Prize money: $21,431

Singles
- Career record: 41–53
- Career titles: 0
- Highest ranking: No. 269 (25 October 1993)

Doubles
- Career record: 17–27
- Career titles: 0
- Highest ranking: No. 317 (2 October 1995)

Team competitions
- Fed Cup: 1–4

Geraldine Dondit (born 13 April 1976) is a former professional tennis player from Switzerland.

== Biography ==
Dondit represented Switzerland in the Fed Cup from 1993 to 1995. She featured in a total of five ties, which included a World Group fixture in 1994. In a 1995 tie against Latvia, Dondit played a doubles rubber with a young Martina Hingis.

On the professional tour, she reached a top singles ranking of 269 in the world, with WTA Tour main-draw appearances at Lucerne in 1994 and Palermo in 1995.

She is now the tournament director of the WTA's Ladies Open Lugano and is a former personal assistant to Roger Federer.

== ITF Circuit finals ==
$25,000 tournaments
$10,000 tournaments

=== Doubles: 1 (0–1) ===
Outcome	No.	Date	Tournament	Surface	Partner	Opponents	Score
Runner-up	1.	11 October 1993	ITF Burgdorf, Switzerland	Hard	(Switzerland) Natalie Tschan	(Czech Republic) Lenka Cenková (Czech Republic) Alena Vašková	6–1, 4–6, 3–6

== See also ==
- List of Switzerland Fed Cup team representatives
