= Angela Bürgis =

Swiss tennis player

- ITF name: Angela Buergis
- Country (sports): Switzerland
- Born: 3 November 1979 (age 46)
- Prize money: $11,317

Singles
- Career titles: 1 ITF
- Highest ranking: No. 424 (30 September 1996)

Doubles
- Career titles: 1 ITF
- Highest ranking: No. 349 (8 December 1997)

Angela Bürgis (born 3 November 1979) is a Swiss former professional tennis player.

Bürgis was a member of Switzerland's 1996 Fed Cup team, appearing in five ties as a doubles player. She won three of her five doubles rubbers, two of which came while partnering Martina Hingis and included a win over Croatia's Mirjana Lucic and Iva Majoli.

On the professional tour she reached a best singles ranking of 424 and twice featured in the qualifying draw of the WTA Tour tournament in Zurich, but otherwise spent her career on the ITF Circuit, where she won a singles title at Tortosa in 1996.

Following her professional career, Bürgis played varsity tennis in the United States at the University of Minnesota, earning selection in the All-Big Ten Team in both 2003 and 2004.

== ITF finals ==
=== Singles: 2 (1–1) ===
Outcome	No.	Date	Tournament	Surface	Opponent	Score
Runner-up	1.	2 March 1996	Pretoria, South Africa	Hard	(South Africa) Jessica Steck	3–6, 2–6
Winner	1.	13 May 1996	Tortosa, Spain	Clay	(Germany) Silke Frankl	6–1, 6–1

=== Doubles: 4 (1–3) ===
Outcome	No.	Date	Tournament	Surface	Partner	Opponents	Score
Runner-up	1.	11 March 1996	Harare, Zimbabwe	Hard	(Austria) Ursula Svetlik	(United States) Audra Brannon (United States) Dana Evans	3–6 6–4, 4–6
Winner	1.	2 December 1996	Ostrava, Czech Republic	Carpet	(Czech Republic) Nikola Hubnerová	(Czech Republic) Gabriela Chmelinová (Slovakia) Sabine Radevicová	2–6, 7–6^{(3)}, 6–1
Runner-up	2.	29 September 1997	Langenthal, Switzerland	Carpet	(Switzerland) Diane Asensio	(Germany) Magdalena Kučerová (Czech Republic) Helena Vildová	5–7, 4–6
Runner-up	3.	6 October 1997	Biel, Switzerland	Carpet	(Switzerland) Diane Asensio	(Austria) Kerstin Marent (Germany) Susi Lohrmann	6–2, 0–6, 4–6

== See also ==
- List of Switzerland Fed Cup team representatives
