= Dorothy L. Njeuma =

Cameroonian academic and politician

- Born: Dorothy Limunga Effange; Buea, Cameroon
- Education: Brown University, University College London
- Scientific career
- Fields: Genetics, embryology
- Workplaces: University of Buea, University of Yaoundé I
- Thesis: (1970)

Dorothy L. Njeuma is a Cameroonian academic and politician.

== Early life and education ==
Born Dorothy Limunga Effange in June 1943, Njeuma comes from southwestern Cameroon. There were no secondary schools for girls in Cameroon during her childhood, so she attended Queen's School, Enugu, in Nigeria from 1955 to 1962. She attended Brown University from 1962 to 1966, having won an African Scholarship Programme for American Universities award, and obtained a degree in biology. From 1966 to 1970, she attended the University College of London and earned a PhD in Zoology.

== Academic career ==
From 1970 to 1975, Njeuma served as an associate professor of Genetics and Embryology at the Federal University of Yaounde, Cameroon. From 1988 to 2005 she worked at the University of Buea, first as Director General of the Buea University Centre (1988–93) and then as Vice-Chancellor (1993–2005). She was then appointed Rector of the University of Yaoundé from 2005 to 2008.

Njeuma is the Vice-President of the Executive Board of the Association of African Universities.

== Political career ==
Njeuma was vice minister of national education from 1975 to 1985, and served as a technical adviser to the Minister of Scientific and Technical Research, from 1986 to 1988. During her time in that position, she oversaw the introduction of GCE exams in Cameroon. In 2009, she was appointed a member of the electoral board of the Cameroonian Institution for Referendums and Elections.

== Personal life ==
She was married to historian Martin Zachary Njeuma (1940–2010), by whom she has two daughters. Her daughter Christine Njeuma became the first female airline pilot in Central Africa. A biographical sketch is given in Njeuma 1999

== Publications ==
- Dorothy L. Njeuma, "An Overview of Women's Education in Africa" in The Politics of Women's Education: Perspectives from Asia, Africa, and Latin America (1993).
