= Christine Njeuma =

Cameroonian pilot

- Born: 22 February 1973 (age 53); Fako, Cameroon
- Education: Embry–Riddle Aeronautical University
- Occupations: Pilot, Athlete
- Parents: Martin Njeuma; Dorothy Njeuma

Christine Bonbankal Njeuma (born 1973) is a Cameroonian pilot, the first woman airline pilot in Central Africa.

== Biography ==
Christine Njeuma was born in Cameroon in 1973, to the politician Dorothy L. Njeuma and the professor Martin Zachary Njeuma. A Kwe woman, she is from the Fako department of Cameroon's Southwest Region.

She traveled to the United States to study French and Spanish at the University of Florida. Then, she trained in aviation at Embry–Riddle Aeronautical University, obtaining a master's degree and an aviation licence in 2001. At the start of her career, she flew Fokker F28 Fellowship planes for logistics companies.

In 2002, Njeuma became the first female airline pilot in Cameroon and in Central Africa more broadly. She is also considered the first female Kwe airline pilot. After initially working for the now-defunct Cameroon Airlines, flying small Beechcraft planes between Douala and Yaoundé, she has flown a Boeing 737 for Camair-Co since it commenced operations in 2011. As of its launch, she was also the only woman pilot employed by the airline.

Njeuma has also played tennis at the international level. She became national champion in Cameroon three times, between 1995 and 1997, and she was part of the Cameroon Fed Cup team for the 1997 Fed Cup, now the Billie Jean King Cup.

== See also ==
- Timeline of women in aviation
