= Pauline Nalova Lyonga =

Cameroonian academic and politician

Minister of Secondary Education
- Incumbent
- Assumed office 2 March 2018
- Prime Minister: Philémon Yang; Joseph Ngute
- Preceded by: Jean Ernest Ngalle Bibehe Massena

Rector of the University of Buea
- In office 29 June 2012 – June 2017
- Preceded by: Vincent P. K. Titanji
- Succeeded by: Ngomo Horace Manga

Personal details
- Party: CPDM
- Education: University of Yaoundé (BA); University of Sheffield (MA); University of Michigan (PhD)

Pauline Nalova Lyonga Egbe is a Cameroonian academic and politician who has served as Minister of Secondary Education since 2018. A member of the Cameroon People's Democratic Movement, she previously served as Rector of the University of Buea from 2012 to 2017.

== Biography ==
=== Youth and education ===
Pauline Nalova Lyonga is originally from Fako in the Southwest Region of Cameroon. After graduating from the Queen of the Rosary Secondary school Okoyong in Mamfe until 1968, Lyonga left for the Cameroon College of Arts Science and Technology in Bambili, where she obtained her GCE A Level (English High School diploma) in 1970. At the University of Yaoundé, she graduated with a bachelor's degree in English literature in 1973. She left Cameroon to pursue her studies in England and obtained a master's degree in African literature from the University of Sheffield. Since 1985, she holds a PhD in English literature from the University of Michigan at Ann Arbor in the US.

=== Career ===
After a long career in university education, during which she held the positions of Director of business, then Vice-Rector, she was appointed rector of the University of Buea on 29 June 2012. She held this position for 5 years until her departure in June 2017 following a presidential decree. A few months later, in November 2017, she was appointed President of the Board of Governors of the Douala General Hospital, a position she held for a few months only, until her appointment on 3 March 2018, to the post of Minister of Secondary Education. She is the author of several publications of African Literature.
