= Talina Beiko =

Ukrainian tennis player and coach

- Native name: Таліна Бейко
- Country (sports): Ukraine
- Born: 31 August 1970 (age 54)
- Turned pro: 1991
- Retired: 1996
- Prize money: $11,949

Singles
- Career record: 38–24
- Career titles: 0 WTA, 2 ITF
- Highest ranking: No. 391 (17 October 1994)

Doubles
- Career record: 25–20
- Career titles: 0 WTA, 1 ITF
- Highest ranking: No. 337 (23 October 1995)

Team competitions
- Fed Cup: 2–4

Talina Beiko (Ukrainian: Таліна Бейко; born 31 August 1970) is a former female tennis player from Ukraine.

Beiko played for Ukraine at the Fed Cup and has a win–loss record of 2–4.

Beiko is the mother of pro tennis player Marta Kostyuk.

== ITF Circuit finals ==
=== Singles (2–3) ===
$100,000 tournaments
$75,000 tournaments
$50,000 tournaments
$25,000 tournaments
$10,000 tournaments

Result	No.	Date	Tournament	Surface	Opponent	Score
Loss	1.	18 October 1993	Šiauliai, Lithuania	Hard (i)	(Russia) Julia Lutrova	3–6, 2–6
Win	2.	23 May 1994	Łódź, Poland	Clay	(Luxembourg) Anne Kremer	6–4, 6–2
Win	3.	3 October 1994	Kyiv, Ukraine	Clay	(Poland) Sylwia Rynarzewska	6–2, 6–4
Loss	4.	5 June 1995	Łódź, Poland	Clay	(Russia) Evgenia Kulikovskaya	1–6, 6–2, 3–6
Loss	5.	25 September 1995	Kyiv, Ukraine	Clay	(Ukraine) Anna Zaporozhanova	6–2, 6–7^{(4–7)}, 5–7

=== Doubles (1–3) ===
Result	No.	Date	Tournament	Surface	Partner	Opponents	Score
Win	1.	18 October 1993	Šiauliai, Lithuania	Hard(i)	(Ukraine) Tanja Tsiganii	(Ukraine) Natalia Bondarenko (Ukraine) Elena Tatarkova	6–3, 6–1
Loss	2.	30 May 1994	Bytom, Poland	Clay	(Ukraine) Tanja Tsiganii	(Russia) Evgenia Kulikovskaya (Ukraine) Natalia Nemchinova	2–6, 6–3, 2–6
Loss	3.	14 August 1995	Carthage, Tunisia	Clay	(Bulgaria) Teodora Nedeva	(Spain) Yolanda Clemot (Argentina) Maria Fernanda Landa	3–6, 2–6
Loss	4.	25 September 1995	Kyiv, Ukraine	Clay	(Ukraine) Tanja Tsiganii	(Ukraine) Natalia Bondarenko (Belarus) Marina Stets	1–6, 4–6
