= Cameroon Billie Jean King Cup team =

Cameroonian women's tennis team

Cameroon
- ITF ranking: NR
- First year: 1997
- Years played: 2
- Ties played (W–L): 8 (1–7)
- Best finish: Zonal Group II

The Cameroon Billie Jean King Cup team represents Cameroon in Billie Jean King Cup tennis competition and are governed by the Fédération Camerounaise de Tennis. They have not competed since 2017.

== History ==
Cameroon competed in its first Fed Cup in 1997. They have won one of their ties to date.

== Players ==
Name	Years	First	Ties	Win/Loss		
Name	Years	First	Ties	Singles	Doubles	Total
Agathe Belibi	1	1997	1	0–1	0–1	0–2
Linda Claire Eloundou Nga	1	2017	3	0–2	0–3	0–5
Manuella Peguy Eloundou Nga	1	2017	2	0–2	0–2	0–4
Venus Mirande Ngone Hagal	1	2017	2	0–2	0–1	0–3
Christine Njeuma	1	1997	5	1–3	0–4	1–7
Nathalie Sienkob	1	1997	5	1–4	0–5	1–9

== See also ==
- Billie Jean King Cup
- Cameroon Davis Cup team
