= 1996 Fed Cup =

International women's tennis competition

Details
- Duration: 27 April – 29 September
- Edition: 34th

Achievements (singles)

The 1996 Fed Cup was the 34th edition of a competition between national teams in women's tennis. The final took place at Boardwalk Hall in Atlantic City, New Jersey in the United States on 28–29 September, with the United States defeating Spain to give the USA their 15th title.

== World Group ==
Participating teams
Argentina	Austria	France	Germany
Japan	South Africa	Spain	United States

=== Draw ===
Quarterfinals; 27–28 April
Murcia, Spain (Outdoor clay)
1	Spain	3
South Africa	2
Amiens, France (Outdoor clay)
Argentina	2
3	France	3
Tokyo, Japan (Indoor hard)
4	Germany	2
Japan	3
Salzburg, Austria (Outdoor clay)
Austria	2
2	United States	3

Semifinals; 13–14 July
Bayonne, France (Indoor carpet)
1	Spain	3
3	France	2
Nagoya, Japan (Indoor carpet)
Japan	0
2	United States	5

Final; 28–29 September
Atlantic City, NJ, United States (Indoor carpet)
1	Spain	0
2	United States	5

== World Group play-offs ==
The four losing teams in the World Group first round ties (Argentina, Austria, Germany and South Africa), and four winners of the World Group II ties (Belgium, Czech Republic, Netherlands and Slovakia) entered the draw for the World Group play-offs.

Date: 13–14 July

Venue	Surface	Home team	Score	Visiting team
Pörtschach, Austria	Outdoor clay	Austria	1–4	Germany
Pilsen, Czech Republic	Indoor carpet	Czech Republic	3–1	Argentina
Bloemfontein, South Africa	Outdoor hard	South Africa	1–4	Belgium
Bratislava, Slovakia	Outdoor clay	Slovakia	2–3	Netherlands

== World Group II ==
The World Group II was the second highest level of Fed Cup competition in 1996. Winners advanced to the World Group play-offs, and loser played in the World Group II play-offs.

Date: 27–28 April

Venue	Surface	Home team	Score	Visiting team
Plovdiv, Bulgaria	Outdoor clay	Bulgaria	0–5	Slovakia
Kampen, Netherlands	Outdoor clay	Netherlands	4–1	Australia
Jakarta, Indonesia	Outdoor hard	Indonesia	2–3	Belgium
Vancouver, British Columbia, Canada	Outdoor hard	Canada	0–3	Czech Republic

== World Group II play-offs ==
The four losing teams from World Group II (Australia, Bulgaria, Canada and Indonesia) played off against qualifiers from Zonal Group I. Two teams qualified from Europe/Africa Zone (Croatia and Switzerland), one team from the Asia/Oceania Zone (South Korea), and one team from the Americas Zone (Chile).

Date: 13–14 July

Venue	Surface	Home team	Score	Visiting team
Aurora, Canada	Outdoor clay	Canada	2–3	Australia
Jakarta, Indonesia	Outdoor hard	Indonesia	2–3	Switzerland
Viña del Mar, Chile	Outdoor clay	Chile	0–5	Croatia
Plovdiv, Bulgaria	Outdoor clay	Bulgaria	1–4	South Korea

== Americas Zone ==
- Nations in **bold** advanced to the higher level of competition.
- Nations in italics were relegated down to a lower level of competition.

=== Group I ===
Venue: Club Palestino, Santiago, Chile (outdoor clay)

Dates: 22–28 April

Participating teams

- Brazil
- **Chile**
- Colombia
- Mexico
- Paraguay
- Puerto Rico
- Uruguay
- Venezuela

=== Group II ===
Venue: Santo Domingo, Dominican Republic (outdoor clay)

Dates: 6–12 May

Participating teams

- Bahamas
- Barbados
- Bermuda
- Bolivia
- Costa Rica
- Cuba
- Dominican Republic
- **Ecuador**
- El Salvador
- Guatemala
- Jamaica
- **Peru**
- Trinidad and Tobago

== Asia/Oceania Zone ==
- Nations in **bold** advanced to the higher level of competition.
- Nations in italics were relegated down to a lower level of competition.

=== Group I ===
Venue: 700 Years Anniversary Complex, Chiang Mai, Thailand (outdoor hard)

Dates: 21–24 February

Participating teams

- China
- Hong Kong
- India
- Kazakhstan
- Malaysia
- Philippines
- **South Korea**
- Thailand

=== Group II ===
Venue: 700 Years Anniversary Complex, Chiang Mai, Thailand (outdoor hard)

Dates: 19–24 January

Participating teams

- Brunei
- **Chinese Taipei**
- **New Zealand**
- Pacific Oceania
- Singapore
- Syria
- Uzbekistan

== Europe/Africa Zone ==
- Nations in **bold** advanced to the higher level of competition.
- Nations in italics were relegated down to a lower level of competition.

=== Group I ===
Venue: La Manga Club, Murcia, Spain (outdoor clay)

Dates: 22–24 April

Participating teams

- Belarus
- **Croatia**
- Georgia
- Great Britain
- Greece
- Hungary
- Italy
- Latvia
- Norway
- Portugal
- Romania
- Russia
- Slovenia
- Sweden
- **Switzerland**
- Yugoslavia

=== Group II ===
Venue: Ramat HaSharon, Israel (outdoor hard)

Dates: 25–30 March

Participating teams

- Botswana
- Cyprus
- Denmark
- Estonia
- Ethiopia
- **Finland**
- Iceland
- Ireland
- **Israel**
- Liechtenstein
- Lithuania
- Luxembourg
- Macedonia
- Malta
- **Poland**
- Tunisia
- Turkey
- **Ukraine**
- Zimbabwe
