= 1996 Fed Cup Europe/Africa Zone Group II – play-offs =

International tennis competition play-offs

The play-offs of the 1996 Fed Cup Europe/Africa Zone Group II were the final stages of the Group II Zonal Competition involving teams from Europe and Africa. Those that qualified for this stage placed first and second in their respective pools.

Placing	Pool A	Pool B	Pool C	Pool D
1	Poland	Finland	Israel	Ukraine
2	Lithuania	Turkey	Luxembourg	Denmark
3	Botswana	Tunisia	Estonia	Ireland
4	Ethiopia	Liechtenstein	Zimbabwe	Malta
5		Cyprus	Macedonia	Iceland

The four teams were then paired up the team from a different placing of the other group for a play-off tie, with the winners being promoted to Group I in 1997.

== Poland vs. Denmark ==
Poland
2
Ramat HaSharon, Israel
30 March 1996
Hard (outdoors)

Denmark
1

			1	2	3
1	(Poland) (Denmark)	Aleksandra Olsza; Karin Ptaszek	6; 4	6; 1
2	(Poland) (Denmark)	Ewa Radzikowska; Sandra Olsen	6^{2} 7^{7}	6; 3	4; 6
3	(Poland) (Denmark)	Magdalena Feistel / Aleksandra Olsza; Karin Ptaszek / Tine Scheuer-Larsen	6; 3	7; 5

== Finland vs. Luxembourg ==
Finland
2
Ramat HaSharon, Israel
30 March 1996
Hard (outdoors)

Luxembourg
1

			1	2	3
1	(Finland) (Luxembourg)	Nanne Dahlman; Anne Kremer	6; 4	6; 3
2	(Finland) (Luxembourg)	Hanna-Katri Aalto; Fabienne Thill	6; 4	6; 4
3	(Finland) (Luxembourg)	Hanna-Katri Aalto / Petra Thorén; Anne Kremer / Alexandra Scholer	3; 0			retired

== Israel vs. Lithuania ==
Israel
3
Ramat HaSharon, Israel
30 March 1996
Hard (outdoors)

Lithuania
0

			1	2	3
1	(Israel) (Lithuania)	Anna Smashnova; Rūta Deduraitė	6; 1	6; 2
2	(Israel) (Lithuania)	Hila Rosen; Odeta Naujokaitė	6; 0	6; 2
3	(Israel) (Lithuania)	Nataly Cahana / Tzipora Obziler; Rūta Deduraitė / Odeta Naujokaitė	6; 4	6; 3

== Ukraine vs. Turkey ==
Ukraine
3
Ramat HaSharon, Israel
30 March 1996
Hard (outdoors)

Turkey
0

			1	2	3
1	(Ukraine) (Turkey)	Elena Tatarkova; Gülberk Gültekin	6; 4	6; 2
2	(Ukraine) (Turkey)	Elena Brioukhovets; İpek Şenoğlu	6; 0	6; 4
3	(Ukraine) (Turkey)	Elena Brioukhovets / Elena Tatarkova; Seden Özlü / İpek Şenoğlu	6; 2	6; 0

== See also ==
- Fed Cup structure
