= 2002 Fed Cup Europe/Africa Zone Group I – Pool D =

International tennis competition

Group D of the 2002 Fed Cup Europe/Africa Zone Group I was one of four pools in the Europe/Africa Zone Group I of the 2002 Fed Cup. Four teams competed in a round robin competition, with the top two teams advancing to the play-offs and the bottom team being relegated down to Group II for 2003.

	(Luxembourg) LUX	(Federal Republic of Yugoslavia) YUG	(Poland) POL	(Turkey) TUR	RR; W–L	Set; W–L	Game; W–L	Standings
Luxembourg		2–1	3–0	2–1	3–0	15–6	113–80	1
FR Yugoslavia	1–2		2–1	3–0	2–1	14–10	112–97	2
Poland	0–3	1–2		2–1	1–2	9–15	93–109	3
Turkey	1–2	0–3	1–2		0–3	6–14	69–101	4

== Luxembourg vs. Turkey ==
Luxembourg
2
Antalya, Turkey
24 April 2002
Red clay (outdoors)

Turkey
1

			1	2	3
1	(Luxembourg) (Turkey)	Claudine Schaul; Pemra Özgen	6; 1	6; 2
2	(Luxembourg) (Turkey)	Anne Kremer; İpek Şenoğlu	6; 3	6; 2
3	(Luxembourg) (Turkey)	Céline Francois / Mandy Minella; Pemra Özgen / İpek Şenoğlu	2; 6	2; 6

== Yugoslavia vs. Poland ==
FR Yugoslavia
2
Antalya, Turkey
24 April 2002
Red clay (outdoors)

Poland
1

			1	2	3
1	(Federal Republic of Yugoslavia) (Poland)	Jelena Janković; Magdalena Grzybowska	6; 1	4; 6	6; 0
2	(Federal Republic of Yugoslavia) (Poland)	Dragana Zarić; Katarzyna Strączy	1; 6	6; 4	6; 3
3	(Federal Republic of Yugoslavia) (Poland)	Daniela Berček / Katarina Mišić; Klaudia Jans / Joanna Sakowicz-Kostecka	6; 2	2; 6	1; 6

== Luxembourg vs. Poland ==
Luxembourg
3
Antalya, Turkey
25 April 2002
Red clay (outdoors)

Poland
0

			1	2	3
1	(Luxembourg) (Poland)	Claudine Schaul; Magdalena Grzybowska	6; 2	7^{7} 6^{1}
2	(Luxembourg) (Poland)	Anne Kremer; Joanna Sakowicz-Kostecka	6^{4} 7^{7}	6; 1	6; 3
3	(Luxembourg) (Poland)	Anne Kremer / Claudine Schaul; Magdalena Grzybowska / Klaudia Jans	6; 3	6; 4

== Yugoslavia vs. Turkey ==
FR Yugoslavia
3
Antalya, Turkey
25 April 2002
Red clay (outdoors)

Turkey
0

			1	2	3
1	(Federal Republic of Yugoslavia) (Turkey)	Katarina Mišić; Merve Asımgil	2; 6	6; 0	6; 2
2	(Federal Republic of Yugoslavia) (Turkey)	Dragana Zarić; İpek Şenoğlu	6; 4	6; 2
3	(Federal Republic of Yugoslavia) (Turkey)	Katarina Mišić / Dragana Zarić; Pemra Özgen / İpek Şenoğlu	7; 5	6; 2

== Luxembourg vs. Yugoslavia ==
Luxembourg
2
Antalya, Turkey
26 April 2002
Red clay (outdoors)

FR Yugoslavia
1

			1	2	3
1	(Luxembourg) (Federal Republic of Yugoslavia)	Claudine Schaul; Katarina Mišić	4; 6	6; 4	6; 4
2	(Luxembourg) (Federal Republic of Yugoslavia)	Anne Kremer; Dragana Zarić	6; 2	6; 1
3	(Luxembourg) (Federal Republic of Yugoslavia)	Céline Francois / Mandy Minella; Daniela Berček / Katarina Mišić	6; 4	6^{4} 7^{7}	2; 6

== Poland vs. Turkey ==
Poland
2
Antalya, Turkey
26 April 2002
Red clay (outdoors)

Turkey
1

			1	2	3
1	(Poland) (Turkey)	Joanna Sakowicz-Kostecka; Merve Asımgil	6; 4	6; 0
2	(Poland) (Turkey)	Katarzyna Strączy; İpek Şenoğlu	4; 6	0; 6
3	(Poland) (Turkey)	Klaudia Jans / Joanna Sakowicz-Kostecka; Duygu Akşit Oal / İpek Şenoğlu	4; 6	7; 5	6; 1

- Turkey failed to win any ties in the pool, and thus was relegated to Group II in 2003, where they came second in the pool of three.

== See also ==
- Fed Cup structure
