= 1996 Fed Cup Europe/Africa Zone Group II – Pool A =

International tennis competition

Group A of the 1996 Fed Cup Europe/Africa Zone Group II was one of four pools in the Europe/Africa zone of the 1996 Fed Cup. Four teams competed in a round robin competition, with the top two teams advancing to the play-offs.

	(Poland) POL	(Lithuania) LIT	(Botswana) BOT	(Ethiopia) ETH	RR; W–L	Set; W–L	Game; W–L	Standings
Poland		3–0	3–0	3–0	3–0	18–0	108–11	1
Lithuania	0–3		3–0	3–0	2–1	12–6	81–44	2
Botswana	0–3	0–3		2–1	1–2	4–14	33–92	3
Ethiopia	0–3	1–2	1–2		0–3	2–16	24–92	4

== Poland vs. Lithuania ==
Poland
3
Ramat HaSharon, Israel
26 March 1996
Hard (outdoors)

Lithuania
0

			1	2	3
1	(Poland) (Lithuania)	Magdalena Grzybowska; Rūta Deduraitė	6; 1	6; 1
2	(Poland) (Lithuania)	Aleksandra Olsza; Odeta Naujokaitė	6; 3	6; 2
3	(Poland) (Lithuania)	Magdalena Feistel / Aleksandra Olsza; Rūta Deduraitė / Odeta Naujokaitė	6; 0	6; 2

== Botswana vs. Ethiopia ==
Botswana
2
Ramat HaSharon, Israel
26 March 1996
Hard (outdoors)

Ethiopia
1

			1	2	3
1	(Botswana) (Ethiopia)	Mmaphala Letsatle; Ruth Tekle Andemariam	6; 2	6; 2
2	(Botswana) (Ethiopia)	Lebogang Seitshiro; Senait Gebreail	1; 6	2; 6
3	(Botswana) (Ethiopia)	Kelesitse Makgale / Lebogang Seitshiro; Senait Gebreail / Mesenbete Shenkutee	6; 0	6; 4

== Poland vs. Botswana ==
Poland
3
Ramat HaSharon, Israel
27 March 1996
Hard (outdoors)

Botswana
0

			1	2	3
1	(Poland) (Botswana)	Magdalena Grzybowska; Mmaphala Letsatle	6; 1	6; 0
2	(Poland) (Botswana)	Aleksandra Olsza; Lebogang Seitshiro	6; 0	6; 0
3	(Poland) (Botswana)	Magdalena Feistel / Ewa Radzikowska; Kelesitse Makgale / Lebogang Seitshiro	6; 0	6; 0

== Lithuania vs. Ethiopia ==
Lithuania
3
Ramat HaSharon, Israel
27 March 1996
Hard (outdoors)

Ethiopia
0

			1	2	3
1	(Lithuania) (Ethiopia)	Rūta Deduraitė; Mesenbete Shenkutee	6; 1	6; 0
2	(Lithuania) (Ethiopia)	Odeta Naujokaitė; Senait Gebreail	6; 1	6; 0
3	(Lithuania) (Ethiopia)	Edita Liachovičiūtė / Odeta Naujokaitė; Ruth Tekle Andemariam / Mesenbete Shenkutee	6; 1	6; 0

== Poland vs. Ethiopia ==
Poland
3
Ramat HaSharon, Israel
28 March 1996
Hard (outdoors)

Ethiopia
0

			1	2	3
1	(Poland) (Ethiopia)	Aleksandra Olsza; Mesenbete Shenkutee	6; 0	6; 0
2	(Poland) (Ethiopia)	Magdalena Feistel; Senait Gebreail	6; 1	6; 0
3	(Poland) (Ethiopia)	Magdalena Feistel / Ewa Radzikowska; Ruth Tekle Andemariam / Mesenbete Shenkutee	6; 0	6; 0

== Lithuania vs. Botswana ==
Lithuania
3
Ramat HaSharon, Israel
28 March 1996
Hard (outdoors)

Botswana
0

			1	2	3
1	(Lithuania) (Botswana)	Rūta Deduraitė; Mmaphala Letsatle	6; 2	6; 0
2	(Lithuania) (Botswana)	Odeta Naujokaitė; Kelesitse Makgale	6; 0	6; 0
3	(Lithuania) (Botswana)	Rūta Deduraitė / Odeta Naujokaitė; Mmaphala Letsatle / Kelesitse Makgale	6; 2	6; 1

== See also ==
- Fed Cup structure
