= 2001 Fed Cup Europe/Africa Zone Group I – play-offs =

The play-offs of the 2001 Fed Cup Europe/Africa Zone Group I were the final stages of the Group I Zonal Competition involving teams from Europe and Africa. Those that qualified for this stage placed first in their respective pools.

Placing	Pool A	Pool B	Pool C	Pool D
1	Netherlands	Slovenia	Sweden	Israel
2	Yugoslavia	Ukraine	Belarus	Greece
3	Poland	Estonia	Romania	Luxembourg
4	Macedonia	South Africa	Great Britain	Bulgaria
5				Denmark

The four teams were then paired up the team from a different placing of the other group for a play-off tie, with the winners being promoted to the World Group play-offs.

== Sweden vs. Netherlands ==
Sweden
2
Murcia, Spain
28 May 2001
Red clay (outdoors)

Netherlands
0

			1	2	3
1	(Sweden) (Netherlands)	Sofia Arvidsson; Kristie Boogert	6; 3	2; 6	7; 5
2	(Sweden) (Netherlands)	Åsa Carlsson; Miriam Oremans	6; 4	7^{7} 6^{5}
3	(Sweden) (Netherlands)					not played

- Sweden advanced to the World Group play-offs, where they were drawn against Japan. They won 3–2, and thus advanced to the World Group for next year.

== Israel vs. Slovenia ==
Israel
2
Murcia, Spain
28 May 2001
Red clay (outdoors)

Slovenia
0

			1	2	3
1	(Israel) (Slovenia)	Tzipora Obziler; Katarina Srebotnik	6; 2	6; 2
2	(Israel) (Slovenia)	Anna Smashnova; Tina Križan	6; 3	1; 6	8; 6
3	(Israel) (Slovenia)					not played

- Israel advanced to the World Group play-offs, where they were drawn against Hungary. They lost 0–3, and thus were placed back to Zonal Group I for next year.

== See also ==
- Fed Cup structure
