= 2001 Fed Cup Europe/Africa Zone Group I – Pool A =

Group A of the 2001 Fed Cup Europe/Africa Zone Group I was one of four pools in the Europe/Africa Zone Group I of the 2001 Fed Cup. Four teams competed in a round robin competition, with the top team advancing to the play-offs and the bottom team being relegated down to Group II for 2002.

	(Netherlands) NED	(Federal Republic of Yugoslavia) YUG	(Poland) POL	(North Macedonia) MKD	RR; W–L	Set; W–L	Game; W–L	Standings
Netherlands		3–0	3–0	3–0	3–0	18–2	116–47	1
Yugoslavia	0–3		3–0	3–0	2–1	13–7	98–70	2
Poland	0–3	0–3		3–0	1–2	7–13	79–92	3
Macedonia	0–3	0–3	0–3		0–3	2–18	34–118	4

== Netherlands vs. Macedonia ==
Netherlands
3
Murcia, Spain
24 May 2001
Red clay (outdoors)

Macedonia
0

			1	2	3
1	(Netherlands) (North Macedonia)	Seda Noorlander; Suzi Becvinovska	3; 6	6; 0	6; 0
2	(Netherlands) (North Macedonia)	Amanda Hopmans; Marina Lazarovska	6; 1	6; 1
3	(Netherlands) (North Macedonia)	Kristie Boogert / Miriam Oremans; Biljana Dimovska / Marina Lazarovska	6; 0	6; 0

== Yugoslavia vs. Poland ==
Yugoslavia
3
Murcia, Spain
24 May 2001
Red clay (outdoors)

Poland
0

			1	2	3
1	(Federal Republic of Yugoslavia) (Poland)	Jelena Janković; Katarzyna Strączy	6; 2	6; 3
2	(Federal Republic of Yugoslavia) (Poland)	Dragana Zarić; Anna Żarska	6; 2	6; 1
3	(Federal Republic of Yugoslavia) (Poland)	Katarina Mišić / Dragana Zarić; Joanna Sakowicz-Kostecka / Anna Żarska	6; 4	2; 6	6; 3

== Netherlands vs. Poland ==
Netherlands
3
Murcia, Spain
25 May 2001
Red clay (outdoors)

Poland
0

			1	2	3
1	(Netherlands) (Poland)	Kristie Boogert; Joanna Sakowicz-Kostecka	6; 4	6; 3
2	(Netherlands) (Poland)	Miriam Oremans; Anna Żarska	6; 1	6; 2
3	(Netherlands) (Poland)	Amanda Hopmans / Seda Noorlander; Joanna Sakowicz-Kostecka / Anna Żarska	6; 2	6; 3

== Yugoslavia vs. Macedonia ==
Yugoslavia
3
Murcia, Spain
25 May 2001
Red clay (outdoors)

Macedonia
0

			1	2	3
1	(Federal Republic of Yugoslavia) (North Macedonia)	Dragana Zarić; Biljana Dimovska	6; 2	6; 0
2	(Federal Republic of Yugoslavia) (North Macedonia)	Sandra Naćuk; Marina Lazarovska	6; 2	6; 2
3	(Federal Republic of Yugoslavia) (North Macedonia)	Katarina Mišić / Dragana Zarić; Suzi Becvinovska / Marina Lazarovska	6; 1	6; 1

== Netherlands vs. Yugoslavia ==
Netherlands
3
Murcia, Spain
26 May 2001
Red clay (outdoors)

Yugoslavia
0

			1	2	3
1	(Netherlands) (Federal Republic of Yugoslavia)	Kristie Boogert; Jelena Janković	5; 7	6; 2	6; 3
2	(Netherlands) (Federal Republic of Yugoslavia)	Miriam Oremans; Sandra Naćuk	6; 4	6; 1
3	(Netherlands) (Federal Republic of Yugoslavia)	Amanda Hopmans / Seda Noorlander; Sandra Naćuk / Katarina Mišić	6; 4	6; 3

== Poland vs. Macedonia ==
Poland
3
Murcia, Spain
26 May 2001
Red clay (outdoors)

Macedonia
0

			1	2	3
1	(Poland) (North Macedonia)	Joanna Sakowicz-Kostecka; Suzi Becvinovska	6; 1	6; 2
2	(Poland) (North Macedonia)	Anna Żarska; Marina Lazarovska	6; 1	6; 0
3	(Poland) (North Macedonia)	Joanna Sakowicz-Kostecka / Katarzyna Strączy; Suzi Becvinovska / Biljana Dimovska	6^{5} 7^{7}	6; 2	7; 5

- Macedonia failed to win any ties in the pool, and thus was relegated to Group II in 2002. However, they did not compete next year.

== See also ==
- Fed Cup structure
