= 2005 Fed Cup Europe/Africa Zone Group I – Pool B =

Group B of the 2005 Fed Cup Europe/Africa Zone Group I was one of four pools in the Europe/Africa Zone Group I of the 2005 Fed Cup. Four teams competed in a round robin competition, with the top team and the bottom team proceeding to their respective sections of the play-offs: the top team played for advancement to the World Group II Play-offs, while the bottom team faced potential relegation to Group II.

		(Sweden) SWE	(Netherlands) NED	(Luxembourg) LUX	(Poland) POL	RR; W–L	Set; W–L	Game; W–L	Standings
31	Sweden		1–2	2–1	2–1	2–1	12–11	109–99	2
33	Netherlands	2–1		3–0	3–0	3–0	17–4	116–70	1
41	Luxembourg	1–2	0–3		2–1	1–2	9–13	93–112	3
46	Poland	1–2	0–3	1–2		0–3	6–16	78–115	4

== Sweden vs. Luxembourg ==
Sweden
2
Club Ali Bey, Manavgat, Antalya, Turkey
20 April 2005
Red clay (outdoors)

Luxembourg
1

			1	2	3
1	(Sweden) (Luxembourg)	Johanna Larsson; Anne Kremer	6; 3	3; 6	6; 3
2	(Sweden) (Luxembourg)	Sofia Arvidsson; Claudine Schaul	5; 7	6^{6} 7^{8}
3	(Sweden) (Luxembourg)	Sofia Arvidsson / Hanna Nooni; Anne Kremer / Claudine Schaul	6; 3	6; 3

== Netherlands vs. Poland ==
Netherlands
3
Club Ali Bey, Manavgat, Antalya, Turkey
20 April 2005
Red clay (outdoors)

Poland
0

			1	2	3
1	(Netherlands) (Poland)	Elise Tamaëla; Joanna Sakowicz-Kostecka	6; 4	6; 3
2	(Netherlands) (Poland)	Michaëlla Krajicek; Karolina Kosińska	6; 1	6; 1
3	(Netherlands) (Poland)	Michelle Gerards / Brenda Schultz-McCarthy; Klaudia Jans / Alicja Rosolska	6; 2	7; 5

== Sweden vs. Netherlands ==
Sweden
1
Club Ali Bey, Manavgat, Antalya, Turkey
21 April 2005
Red clay (outdoors)

Netherlands
2

			1	2	3
1	(Sweden) (Netherlands)	Johanna Larsson; Brenda Schultz-McCarthy	7; 5	3; 6	6; 1
2	(Sweden) (Netherlands)	Hanna Nooni; Michaëlla Krajicek	4; 6	0; 6
3	(Sweden) (Netherlands)	Sofia Arvidsson / Hanna Nooni; Michaëlla Krajicek / Brenda Schultz-McCarthy	6; 4	4; 6	4; 6

== Luxembourg vs. Poland ==
Luxembourg
2
Club Ali Bey, Manavgat, Antalya, Turkey
21 April 2005
Red clay (outdoors)

Poland
1

			1	2	3
1	(Luxembourg) (Poland)	Anne Kremer; Joanna Sakowicz-Kostecka	6; 3	6; 3
2	(Luxembourg) (Poland)	Claudine Schaul; Karolina Kosińska	6; 4	4; 6	6; 4
3	(Luxembourg) (Poland)	Anne Kremer / Mandy Minella; Klaudia Jans / Alicja Rosolska	3; 6	6; 3	4; 6

== Sweden vs. Poland ==
Sweden
2
Club Ali Bey, Manavgat, Antalya, Turkey
22 April 2005
Red clay (outdoors)

Poland
1

			1	2	3
1	(Sweden) (Poland)	Johanna Larsson; Joanna Sakowicz-Kostecka	6; 3	6; 3
2	(Sweden) (Poland)	Sofia Arvidsson; Karolina Kosińska	4; 6	6; 2	6; 1
3	(Sweden) (Poland)	Sofia Arvidsson / Hanna Nooni; Klaudia Jans / Alicja Rosolska	6; 0	3; 6	0; 6

== Netherlands vs. Luxembourg ==
Netherlands
3
Club Ali Bey, Manavgat, Antalya, Turkey
22 April 2005
Red clay (outdoors)

Luxembourg
0

			1	2	3
1	(Netherlands) (Luxembourg)	Elise Tamaëla; Anne Kremer	6; 2	6; 1
2	(Netherlands) (Luxembourg)	Michaëlla Krajicek; Claudine Schaul	6; 3	3; 6	6; 3
3	(Netherlands) (Luxembourg)	Michelle Gerards / Brenda Schultz-McCarthy; Anne Kremer / Mandy Minella	6; 3	6; 2

== See also ==
- Fed Cup structure
