= 2004 Fed Cup Europe/Africa Zone Group I – Pool D =

International tennis competition

Group D of the 2004 Fed Cup Europe/Africa Zone Group I was one of four pools in the Europe/Africa Zone Group I of the 2004 Fed Cup. Three teams competed in a round robin competition, with the top two teams advancing to the advancement play-offs and the bottom team being relegated down to the relegation play-offs.

		(Bulgaria) BUL	(Estonia) EST	(Poland) POL	(Greece) GRE	RR; W–L	Set; W–L	Game; W–L	Standings
31	Bulgaria		1–2	2–1	2–1	2–1	14–9	121–96	2
39	Estonia	2–1		2–1	3–0	3–0	15–8	121–92	1
41	Poland	1–2	1–2		2–1	1–2	8–13	93–115	3
47	Greece	1–2	0–3	1–2		0–3	8–15	89–121	4

== Bulgaria vs. Estonia ==
Bulgaria
1
Athens Lawn Tennis Club, Athens, Greece
19 April 2004
Red clay (outdoors)

Estonia
2

			1	2	3
1	(Bulgaria) (Estonia)	Tsvetana Pironkova; Maret Ani	6; 2	0; 6	3; 6
2	(Bulgaria) (Estonia)	Sesil Karatantcheva; Kaia Kanepi	6; 3	6; 3
3	(Bulgaria) (Estonia)	Sesil Karatantcheva / Maria Penkova; Maret Ani / Margit Rüütel	5; 7	6; 3	4; 6

== Poland vs. Greece ==
Poland
2
Athens Lawn Tennis Club, Athens, Greece
20 April 2004
Red clay (outdoors)

Greece
1

			1	2	3
1	(Poland) (Greece)	Karolina Kosińska; Christina Zachariadou	7; 5	6; 1
2	(Poland) (Greece)	Joanna Sakowicz-Kostecka; Eleni Daniilidou	1; 6	4; 6
3	(Poland) (Greece)	Klaudia Jans / Alicja Rosolska; Eleni Daniilidou / Christina Zachariadou	4; 6	6; 4	6; 4

== Bulgaria vs. Greece ==
Bulgaria
2
Athens Lawn Tennis Club, Athens, Greece
21 April 2004
Red clay (outdoors)

Greece
1

			1	2	3
1	(Bulgaria) (Greece)	Tsvetana Pironkova; Asimina Kaplani	6; 0	6; 1
2	(Bulgaria) (Greece)	Sesil Karatantcheva; Eleni Daniilidou	4; 6	6; 3	7; 5
3	(Bulgaria) (Greece)	Maria Penkova / Tsvetana Pironkova; Asimina Kaplani / Christina Zachariadou	6; 3	3; 6	5; 7

== Estonia vs. Poland ==
Estonia
2
Athens Lawn Tennis Club, Athens, Greece
21 April 2004
Red clay (outdoors)

Poland
1

			1	2	3
1	(Estonia) (Poland)	Margit Rüütel; Karolina Kosińska	4; 6	6; 4	5; 7
2	(Estonia) (Poland)	Maret Ani; Joanna Sakowicz-Kostecka	7; 5	6; 1
3	(Estonia) (Poland)	Maret Ani / Kaia Kanepi; Klaudia Jans / Alicja Rosolska	7^{7} 6^{4}	6; 1

== Bulgaria vs. Poland ==
Bulgaria
2
Athens Lawn Tennis Club, Athens, Greece
22 April 2004
Red clay (outdoors)

Poland
1

			1	2	3
1	(Bulgaria) (Poland)	Tsvetana Pironkova; Karolina Kosińska	7; 5	6; 4
2	(Bulgaria) (Poland)	Sesil Karatantcheva; Klaudia Jans	6; 3	6; 0
3	(Bulgaria) (Poland)	Sesil Karatantcheva / Maria Penkova; Karolina Kosińska / Alicja Rosolska	6; 3	6^{1} 7^{7}	5; 7

== Estonia vs. Greece ==
Estonia
3
Athens Lawn Tennis Club, Athens, Greece
23 April 2004
Red clay (outdoors)

Greece
0

			1	2	3
1	(Estonia) (Greece)	Margit Rüütel; Anna Gerasimou	6; 3	4; 6	6; 3
2	(Estonia) (Greece)	Maret Ani; Asimina Kaplani	6; 1	6; 3
3	(Estonia) (Greece)	Ilona Poljakova / Margit Rüütel; Eleni Daniilidou / Christina Zachariadou	6; 3	4; 6	6; 1

== See also ==
- Fed Cup structure
