= 1997 Fed Cup Europe/Africa Zone Group I – Pool C =

International tennis competition

Group C of the 1997 Fed Cup Europe/Africa Zone Group I was one of four pools in the Europe/Africa Zone Group I of the 1997 Fed Cup. Three teams competed in a round robin competition, with the top two teams advancing to the knockout stage.

	(Belarus) BLR	(Hungary) HUN	(Poland) POL	(Finland) FIN	RR; W–L	Set; W–L	Game; W–L	Standings
Belarus		2–1	3–0	3–0	3–0	16–6	118–68	1
Hungary	1–2		3–0	3–0	2–1	16–5	106–78	2
Poland	0–3	0–3		3–0	1–2	8–13	75–110	3
Finland	0–3	0–3	0–3		0–3	2–18	62–115	4

== Belarus vs. Finland ==
Belarus
3
Bari T.C., Bari, Italy
22 April 1997
Red clay (outdoors)

Finland
0

			1	2	3
1	(Belarus) (Finland)	Olga Barabanschikova; Hanna-Katri Aalto	6; 2	6; 3
2	(Belarus) (Finland)	Natasha Zvereva; Nanne Dahlman	6; 1	2; 6	6; 3
3	(Belarus) (Finland)	Olga Barabanschikova / Natasha Zvereva; Linda Jansson / Kirsi Lampinen	6; 1	6; 2

== Hungary vs. Poland ==
Hungary
3
Bari T.C., Bari, Italy
22 April 1997
Red clay (outdoors)

Poland
0

			1	2	3
1	(Hungary) (Poland)	Anna Földényi; Katarzyna Teodorowicz-Lisowska	6; 0	6; 1
2	(Hungary) (Poland)	Katalin Marosi; Katarzyna Strączy	5; 7	6; 3	6; 4
3	(Hungary) (Poland)	Katalin Marosi / Réka Vidáts; Katarzyna Strączy / Katarzyna Teodorowicz-Lisowska	7; 5	6; 2

== Belarus vs. Poland ==
Belarus
3
Bari T.C., Bari, Italy
23 April 1997
Red clay (outdoors)

Poland
0

			1	2	3
1	(Belarus) (Poland)	Olga Barabanschikova; Monika Starosta	6; 1	6; 0
2	(Belarus) (Poland)	Natasha Zvereva; Katarzyna Strączy	4; 6	6; 3	6; 1
3	(Belarus) (Poland)	Tatiana Ignatieva / Tatiana Poutchek; Monika Starosta / Katarzyna Teodorowicz-Lisowska	6; 1	6; 1

== Hungary vs. Finland ==
Hungary
3
Bari T.C., Bari, Italy
23 April 1997
Red clay (outdoors)

Finland
0

			1	2	3
1	(Hungary) (Finland)	Anna Földényi; Hanna-Katri Aalto	6; 4	6; 0
2	(Hungary) (Finland)	Réka Vidáts; Nanne Dahlman	6; 2	6; 1
3	(Hungary) (Finland)	Katalin Marosi / Réka Vidáts; Linda Jansson / Kirsi Lampinen	7; 5	6; 4

== Belarus vs. Hungary ==
Belarus
2
Bari T.C., Bari, Italy
24 April 1997
Red clay (outdoors)

Hungary
1

			1	2	3
1	(Belarus) (Hungary)	Olga Barabanschikova; Anna Földényi	3; 6	5; 7
2	(Belarus) (Hungary)	Natasha Zvereva; Katalin Marosi	7^{7} 6^{5}	3; 6	6; 3
3	(Belarus) (Hungary)	Olga Barabanschikova / Natasha Zvereva; Katalin Marosi / Réka Vidáts	4; 6	6; 1	6; 2

== Poland vs. Finland ==
Poland
3
Bari T.C., Bari, Italy
24 April 1997
Red clay (outdoors)

Finland
0

			1	2	3
1	(Poland) (Finland)	Katarzyna Teodorowicz-Lisowska; Hanna-Katri Aalto	3; 6	6; 4	7; 5
2	(Poland) (Finland)	Katarzyna Strączy; Nanne Dahlman	6; 2	6; 3
3	(Poland) (Finland)	Katarzyna Strączy / Katarzyna Teodorowicz-Lisowska; Linda Jansson / Kirsi Lampinen	6; 4	6; 4

- Finland failed to win any ties in the pool, and thus was relegated to Group II in 1998, where they placed first in their pool of five, and thus advanced back to Group I for 1999.

== See also ==
- Fed Cup structure
