= 2011 Fed Cup Europe/Africa Zone Group I – Pool B =

Group B of the 2011 Fed Cup Europe/Africa Zone Group I was one of four pools in the Europe/Africa zone of the 2011 Fed Cup. Three teams competed in a round robin competition, with the top team and the bottom team proceeding to their respective sections of the play-offs: the top team played for advancement to the World Group II Play-offs, while the bottom team faced potential relegation to Group II.

		(Poland) POL	(Israel) ISR	(Bulgaria) BUL	(Luxembourg) LUX	RR; W–L	Set; W–L	Game; W–L	Standings
21	Poland		2–1	1–2	2–1	2–1	12–6	94–65	1
29	Israel	1–2		2–1	3–0	2–1	14–8	101–72	2
43	Bulgaria	2–1	1–2		1–2	1–2	9–11	86–87	4
48	Luxembourg	1–2	0–3	2–1		1–2	5–13	52–98	3

== Israel vs. Luxembourg ==
Israel
3
Municipal Tennis Club, Eilat, Israel
2 February 2011
Hard (outdoors)

Luxembourg
0

			1	2	3
1	(Israel) (Luxembourg)	Julia Glushko; Anne Kremer	6; 1	5; 7	6; 0
2	(Israel) (Luxembourg)	Shahar Pe'er; Mandy Minella	6; 3	6; 3
3	(Israel) (Luxembourg)	Julia Glushko / Shahar Pe'er; Tiffany Cornelius / Mandy Minella	6; 1	6; 1

== Poland vs. Bulgaria ==
Poland
1
Municipal Tennis Club, Eilat, Israel
2 February 2011
Hard (outdoors)

Bulgaria
2

			1	2	3
1	(Poland) (Bulgaria)	Magda Linette; Elitsa Kostova	4; 6	6; 4	6^{5} 7^{7}
2	(Poland) (Bulgaria)	Agnieszka Radwańska; Tsvetana Pironkova	6; 2	6; 4
3	(Poland) (Bulgaria)	Klaudia Jans / Alicja Rosolska; Magdalena Maleeva / Tsvetana Pironkova	1; 6	3; 6

== Poland vs. Israel ==
Poland
2
Municipal Tennis Club, Eilat, Israel
3 February 2011
Hard (outdoors)

Israel
1

			1	2	3
1	(Poland) (Israel)	Magda Linette; Julia Glushko	5; 7	3; 6
2	(Poland) (Israel)	Agnieszka Radwańska; Shahar Pe'er	6; 3	6; 3
3	(Poland) (Israel)	Klaudia Jans / Agnieszka Radwańska; Julia Glushko / Shahar Pe'er	6; 3	6; 3

== Bulgaria vs. Luxembourg ==
Bulgaria
1
Municipal Tennis Club, Eilat, Israel
3 February 2011
Hard (outdoors)

Luxembourg
2

			1	2	3
1	(Bulgaria) (Luxembourg)	Dia Evtimova; Anne Kremer	3; 6	3; 6
2	(Bulgaria) (Luxembourg)	Tsvetana Pironkova; Mandy Minella	4; 6	4; 6
3	(Bulgaria) (Luxembourg)	Magdalena Maleeva / Tsvetana Pironkova; Mandy Minella / Claudine Schaul	6; 2	7; 5

== Poland vs. Luxembourg ==
Poland
2
Municipal Tennis Club, Eilat, Israel
3 February 2011
Hard (outdoors)

Luxembourg
1

			1	2	3
1	(Poland) (Luxembourg)	Magda Linette; Anne Kremer	6; 1	6; 1
2	(Poland) (Luxembourg)	Agnieszka Radwańska; Mandy Minella	6; 1	6; 2
3	(Poland) (Luxembourg)	Klaudia Jans / Alicja Rosolska; Mandy Minella / Claudine Schaul	6; 0			retired

== Israel vs. Bulgaria ==
Israel
2
Municipal Tennis Club, Eilat, Israel
4 February 2011
Hard (outdoors)

Bulgaria
1

			1	2	3
1	(Israel) (Bulgaria)	Julia Glushko; Elitsa Kostova	6; 0	6; 2
2	(Israel) (Bulgaria)	Shahar Pe'er; Tsvetana Pironkova	4; 6	6; 4	6; 0
3	(Israel) (Bulgaria)	Valeria Patiuk / Keren Shlomo; Dia Evtimova / Magdalena Maleeva	3; 6	4; 6
