= 2007 Fed Cup Europe/Africa Zone Group I – Pool D =

Group D of the 2007 Fed Cup Europe/Africa Zone Group I was one of four pools in the Europe/Africa Zone Group I of the 2007 Fed Cup. Four teams competed in a round robin competition, with the top team and the bottom team proceeding to their respective sections of the play-offs: the top team played for advancement to the World Group II Play-offs, while the bottom team faced potential relegation to Group II.

		(Bulgaria) BUL	(United Kingdom) GBR	(Luxembourg) LUX	(Poland) POL	RR; W–L	Set; W–L	Game; W–L	Standings
25	Bulgaria		0–3	1–2	0–3	0–3	4–17	74–125	4
29	Great Britain	3–0		1–2	0–3	1–2	9–13	101–114	3
37	Luxembourg	2–1	2–1		0–3	2–1	11–11	107–102	2
44	Poland	3–0	3–0	3–0		3–0	18–1	111–52	1

== Bulgaria vs. Great Britain ==
Bulgaria
0
TC Lokomotiv, Plovdiv, Bulgaria
18 April 2007
Red clay (outdoors)

Great Britain
3

			1	2	3
1	(Bulgaria) (United Kingdom)	Dia Evtimova; Elena Baltacha	6; 4	4; 6	6; 8
2	(Bulgaria) (United Kingdom)	Tsvetana Pironkova; Anne Keothavong	7; 5	4; 6	3; 6
3	(Bulgaria) (United Kingdom)	Jaklin Alawi / Dessislava Mladenova; Elena Baltacha / Claire Curran	4; 6	2; 6

== Luxembourg vs. Poland ==
Luxembourg
0
TC Lokomotiv, Plovdiv, Bulgaria
18 April 2007
Red clay (outdoors)

Poland
3

			1	2	3
1	(Luxembourg) (Poland)	Mandy Minella; Marta Domachowska	4; 6	6^{6} 7^{8}
2	(Luxembourg) (Poland)	Anne Kremer; Agnieszka Radwańska	2; 6	3; 6
3	(Luxembourg) (Poland)	Anne Kremer / Lynn Philippe; Klaudia Jans / Agnieszka Radwańska	6; 2	1; 6	1; 6

== Bulgaria vs. Poland ==
Bulgaria
0
TC Lokomotiv, Plovdiv, Bulgaria
19 April 2007
Red clay (outdoors)

Poland
3

			1	2	3
1	(Bulgaria) (Poland)	Dia Evtimova; Urszula Radwańska	1; 6	3; 6
2	(Bulgaria) (Poland)	Tsvetana Pironkova; Agnieszka Radwańska	2; 6	3; 6
3	(Bulgaria) (Poland)	Jaklin Alawi / Dessislava Mladenova; Marta Domachowska / Klaudia Jans	0; 6	3; 6

== Great Britain vs. Luxembourg ==
Great Britain
1
TC Lokomotiv, Plovdiv, Bulgaria
19 April 2007
Red clay (outdoors)

Luxembourg
2

			1	2	3
1	(United Kingdom) (Luxembourg)	Naomi Cavaday; Mandy Minella	6; 4	6^{2} 7^{7}	4; 6
2	(United Kingdom) (Luxembourg)	Anne Keothavong; Anne Kremer	3; 6	3; 6
3	(United Kingdom) (Luxembourg)	Elena Baltacha / Claire Curran; Anne Kremer / Lynn Philippe	6; 4	3; 6	6; 3

== Bulgaria vs. Luxembourg ==
Bulgaria
1
TC Lokomotiv, Plovdiv, Bulgaria
20 April 2007
Red clay (outdoors)

Luxembourg
2

			1	2	3
1	(Bulgaria) (Luxembourg)	Dia Evtimova; Mandy Minella	3; 6	7; 5	3; 6
2	(Bulgaria) (Luxembourg)	Tsvetana Pironkova; Anne Kremer	2; 6	1; 6
3	(Bulgaria) (Luxembourg)	Dia Evtimova / Dessislava Mladenova; Mandy Minella / Lynn Philippe	3; 6	7^{7} 6^{3}	0; 1	retired

== Great Britain vs. Poland ==
Great Britain
0
TC Lokomotiv, Plovdiv, Bulgaria
20 April 2007
Red clay (outdoors)

Poland
3

			1	2	3
1	(United Kingdom) (Poland)	Elena Baltacha; Marta Domachowska	1; 6	4; 6
2	(United Kingdom) (Poland)	Naomi Cavaday; Agnieszka Radwańska	3; 6	2; 6
3	(United Kingdom) (Poland)	Elena Baltacha / Claire Curran; Marta Domachowska / Agnieszka Radwańska	3; 6	4; 6

== See also ==
- Fed Cup structure
