= 2012 Fed Cup Europe/Africa Zone Group I – Pool D =

Group D of the 2012 Fed Cup Europe/Africa Zone Group I was one of four pools in the Europe/Africa zone of the 2012 Fed Cup. Three teams competed in a round robin competition, with the top team and the bottom team proceeding to their respective sections of the play-offs: the top team played for advancement to the World Group II Play-offs, while the bottom team faced potential relegation to Group II.

		(Poland) POL	(Romania) ROU	(Croatia) CRO	(Luxembourg) LUX	RR; W–L	Set; W–L	Game; W–L	Standings
24	Poland		2–1	3–0	3–0	3–0	16–3	112–47	1
27	Romania	1–2		2–1	3–0	2–1	14–6	98–78	2
42	Croatia	0–3	1–2		2–1	1–2	6–13	81–92	3
47	Luxembourg	0–3	0–3	1–2		0–3	2–16	44–105	4

== Poland vs. Luxembourg ==
Poland
3
Municipal Tennis Club, Eilat, Israel
February 1, 2012
Hard (outdoors)

Luxembourg
0

			1	2	3
1	(Poland) (Luxembourg)	Urszula Radwańska; Claudine Schaul	6; 2	6; 2
2	(Poland) (Luxembourg)	Agnieszka Radwańska; Anne Kremer	6; 1	6; 1
3	(Poland) (Luxembourg)	Magda Linette / Alicja Rosolska; Tiffany Cornelius / Laura Correia	6; 1	6; 1

== Romania vs. Croatia ==
Romania
2
Municipal Tennis Club, Eilat, Israel
February 1, 2012
Hard (outdoors)

Croatia
1

			1	2	3
1	(Romania) (Croatia)	Simona Halep; Ani Mijačika	6; 2	6; 2
2	(Romania) (Croatia)	Irina-Camelia Begu; Petra Martić	4; 6	6; 1	3; 6
3	(Romania) (Croatia)	Irina-Camelia Begu / Simona Halep; Petra Martić / Ani Mijačika	7^{7} 6^{2}	7^{8} 6^{6}

== Poland vs. Croatia ==
Poland
3
Municipal Tennis Club, Eilat, Israel
February 2, 2012
Hard (outdoors)

Croatia
0

			1	2	3
1	(Poland) (Croatia)	Urszula Radwańska; Donna Vekić	6; 3	6; 3
2	(Poland) (Croatia)	Agnieszka Radwańska; Petra Martić	6; 0	6; 3
3	(Poland) (Croatia)	Magda Linette / Alicja Rosolska; Ani Mijačika / Donna Vekić	7; 5	7; 5

== Romania vs. Luxembourg ==
Romania
3
Municipal Tennis Club, Eilat, Israel
February 2, 2012
Hard (outdoors)

Luxembourg
0

			1	2	3
1	(Romania) (Luxembourg)	Mihaela Buzărnescu; Tiffany Cornelius	6; 0	6; 0
2	(Romania) (Luxembourg)	Irina-Camelia Begu; Anne Kremer	6; 3	6; 2
3	(Romania) (Luxembourg)	Irina-Camelia Begu / Mihaela Buzărnescu; Anne Kremer / Claudine Schaul	6; 3	6; 3

== Poland vs. Romania ==
Poland
2
Municipal Tennis Club, Eilat, Israel
February 3, 2012
Hard (outdoors)

Romania
1

			1	2	3
1	(Poland) (Romania)	Urszula Radwańska; Simona Halep	6^{7} 7^{9}	4; 6
2	(Poland) (Romania)	Agnieszka Radwańska; Irina-Camelia Begu	6; 1	6; 3
3	(Poland) (Romania)	Agnieszka Radwańska / Urszula Radwańska; Irina-Camelia Begu / Simona Halep	4; 6	6; 0	6; 0

== Croatia vs. Luxembourg ==
Croatia
2
Municipal Tennis Club, Eilat, Israel
February 3, 2012
Hard (outdoors)

Luxembourg
1

			1	2	3
1	(Croatia) (Luxembourg)	Ani Mijačika; Claudine Schaul	6; 1	2; 6	6; 4
2	(Croatia) (Luxembourg)	Petra Martić; Anne Kremer	5; 7	2; 3		retired
3	(Croatia) (Luxembourg)	Ani Mijačika / Tereza Mrdeža; Anne Kremer / Claudine Schaul	6; 1	6; 3

== See also ==
- Fed Cup structure
