= 2008 Fed Cup Europe/Africa Zone Group I – play-offs =

International tennis competition play-offs

The play-offs of the 2008 Fed Cup Europe/Africa Zone Group I were the final stages of the Group I zonal competition involving teams from Europe and Africa. Using the positions determined in their pools, the sixteen teams faced off to determine their placing in the 2008 Fed Cup Europe/Africa Zone Group I. The top two teams advanced to World Group II play-offs, and the bottom two teams were relegated down to the Europe/Africa Zone Group II for the next year.

Placing	Pool A	Pool B	Pool C	Pool D
1	Netherlands	Switzerland	Sweden	Serbia
2	Bulgaria	Hungary	Belarus	Romania
3	Luxembourg	Denmark	Slovenia	Poland
4	Portugal	Great Britain	Georgia	

== Promotional play-offs ==
The first placed teams of each pool were placed against each other in two head-to-head rounds. The winner of the rounds advanced to the World Group II play-offs, where they would get a chance to advance to the World Group II for next year.

=== Netherlands vs. Serbia ===
Netherlands
0
SYMA Sportközpont, Budapest, Hungary
2 February 2008
Taraflex carpet (indoors)

Serbia
2

			1	2	3
1	(Netherlands) (Serbia)	Renée Reinhard; Ana Ivanovic	2; 6	6; 3	3; 6
2	(Netherlands) (Serbia)	Arantxa Rus; Jelena Janković	4; 6	6^{7} 7^{9}
3	(Netherlands) (Serbia)					not played

=== Switzerland vs. Sweden ===
Switzerland
2
SYMA Sportközpont, Budapest, Hungary
2 February 2008
Taraflex carpet (indoors)

Sweden
1

			1	2	3
1	(Switzerland) (Sweden)	Emmanuelle Gagliardi; Johanna Larsson	6; 4	5; 7	6; 4
2	(Switzerland) (Sweden)	Patty Schnyder; Sofia Arvidsson	2; 6	6; 3	3; 6
3	(Switzerland) (Sweden)	Emmanuelle Gagliardi / Patty Schnyder; Sofia Arvidsson / Johanna Larsson	2; 6	6; 3	7^{7} 6^{3}

== Fifth to seventh play-off ==
The second placed teams of each pool were placed against each other in two ties. The winner of each tie was allocated fifth place in the Group while the losers were allocated seventh.

=== Bulgaria vs. Hungary ===
Bulgaria
0
SYMA Sportközpont, Budapest, Hungary
2 February 2008
Taraflex carpet (indoors)

Hungary
2

			1	2	3
1	(Bulgaria) (Hungary)	Elitsa Kostova; Gréta Arn	2; 6	1; 6
2	(Bulgaria) (Hungary)	Dia Evtimova; Ágnes Szávay	0; 6	0; 6
3	(Bulgaria) (Hungary)					not played

=== Belarus vs. Romania ===
Belarus
0
SYMA Sportközpont, Budapest, Hungary
2 February 2008
Taraflex carpet (indoors)

Romania
2

			1	2	3
1	(Belarus) (Romania)	Ima Bohush; Monica Niculescu	0; 6	3; 6
2	(Belarus) (Romania)	Olga Govortsova; Sorana Cîrstea	2; 6	6^{3} 7^{7}
3	(Belarus) (Romania)					not played

== Ninth ==
Due to the fact that there were an odd number of teams in Pool D (three), as opposed to the four teams in the other pools, all the teams that placed third in the pools with four teams (Luxembourg, Denmark and Slovenia) were allocated ninth place.

== Relegation play-offs ==
The last placed teams of each pool were placed against each other in two ties. The losing team of the rounds were relegated to Group II for next year.

=== Portugal vs. Great Britain ===
Portugal
0
SYMA Sportközpont, Budapest, Hungary
2 February 2008
Taraflex carpet (indoors)

Great Britain
2

			1	2	3
1	(Portugal) (United Kingdom)	Ana Catarina Nogueira; Anne Keothavong	1; 6	6^{1} 7^{7}
2	(Portugal) (United Kingdom)	Magali de Lattre; Katie O'Brien	4; 6	2; 6
3	(Portugal) (United Kingdom)					not played

=== Georgia vs. Poland ===
Georgia
0
SYMA Sportközpont, Budapest, Hungary
2 February 2008
Taraflex carpet (indoors)

Poland
3

			1	2	3
1	(Georgia (country)) (Poland)	Tatia Mikadze; Urszula Radwańska	1; 6	0; 6
2	(Georgia (country)) (Poland)	Oksana Kalashnikova; Agnieszka Radwańska	4; 6	3; 6
3	(Georgia (country)) (Poland)	Ekaterine Gorgodze / Sofia Kvatsabaia; Klaudia Jans / Alicja Rosolska	1; 6	1; 6

== Final placements ==
Placing	Teams
Promoted	Serbia
Promoted	Switzerland
Third	Netherlands
Third	Sweden
Fifth	Hungary
Fifth	Romania
Seventh	Bulgaria
Seventh	Belarus
Ninth	Luxembourg
Ninth	Denmark
Ninth	Slovenia
Twelfth	Great Britain
Twelfth	Poland
Relegated	Portugal
Relegated	Georgia

- Serbia and Switzerland advanced to the World Group II play-offs. The Serbians were drawn against Croatia, and they won 3–2, which thus caused them to advance to 2009 World Group II. The Swiss, however, were drawn against Austria, and they also lost 2–3. They thus were relegated back to Group I.
- Portugal and Georgia were relegated down to Europe/Africa Zone Group II for the next year. They both placed second in their respective pools, and thus advanced to the play-offs. The Portuguese won their tie, and thus advanced back to Group I, while the Georgians lost theirs and therefore remained in Group II for 2010.
