= 2006 Fed Cup Europe/Africa Zone Group II – Pool B =

Group B of the 2006 Fed Cup Europe/Africa Zone Group II was one of four pools in the Europe/Africa Zone Group II of the 2006 Fed Cup. Three teams competed in a round robin competition, with the top team and the bottom two teams proceeding to their respective sections of the play-offs: the top teams played for advancement to Group I, while the bottom team faced potential relegation to Group III.

		(Latvia) LAT	(Portugal) POR	(Poland) POL	(Greece) GRE	RR; W–L	Set; W–L	Game; W–L	Standings
55	Latvia		1–2	0–3	1–2	0–3	7–14	77–107	4
59	Portugal	2–1		0–3	2–1	2–1	9–13	87–104	2
64	Poland	3–0	3–0		3–0	3–0	18–0	109–40	1
67	Greece	2–1	1–2	0–3		1–2	7–14	84–106	3

== Latvia vs. Greece ==
Latvia
1
Club Ali Bey, Manavgat, Antalya, Turkey
26 April 2006
Red clay (outdoors)

Greece
2

			1	2	3
1	(Latvia) (Greece)	Anastasija Sevastova; Anna Gerasimou	1; 6	6; 4	4; 6
2	(Latvia) (Greece)	Alise Vaidere; Anna Koumantou	4; 6	2; 6
3	(Latvia) (Greece)	Anastasija Sevastova / Alise Vaidere; Anna Gerasimou / Anna Koumantou	7; 5	6; 2

== Portugal vs. Poland ==
Portugal
0
Club Ali Bey, Manavgat, Antalya, Turkey
26 April 2006
Red clay (outdoors)

Poland
3

			1	2	3
1	(Portugal) (Poland)	Ana Catarina Nogueira; Urszula Radwańska	2; 6	1; 6
2	(Portugal) (Poland)	Magali de Lattre; Agnieszka Radwańska	4; 6	1; 6
3	(Portugal) (Poland)	Ana Catarina Nogueira / Neuza Silva; Klaudia Jans / Alicja Rosolska	2; 6	2; 6

== Latvia vs. Portugal ==
Latvia
1
Club Ali Bey, Manavgat, Antalya, Turkey
27 April 2006
Red clay (outdoors)

Portugal
2

			1	2	3
1	(Latvia) (Portugal)	Anastasija Sevastova; Magali de Lattre	6; 4	6; 0
2	(Latvia) (Portugal)	Alise Vaidere; Frederica Piedade	6; 4	4; 6	3; 6
3	(Latvia) (Portugal)	Anastasija Sevastova / Alise Vaidere; Ana Catarina Nogueira / Neuza Silva	3; 6	6; 4	2; 6

== Poland vs. Greece ==
Poland
3
Club Ali Bey, Manavgat, Antalya, Turkey
27 April 2006
Red clay (outdoors)

Greece
0

			1	2	3
1	(Poland) (Greece)	Urszula Radwańska; Anna Gerasimou	7^{7} 6^{5}	6; 4
2	(Poland) (Greece)	Agnieszka Radwańska; Anna Koumantou	6; 2	6; 1
3	(Poland) (Greece)	Klaudia Jans / Alicja Rosolska; Anna Gerasimou / Anna Koumantou	6; 3	6; 1

== Latvia vs. Poland ==
Latvia
0
Club Ali Bey, Manavgat, Antalya, Turkey
28 April 2006
Red clay (outdoors)

Poland
3

			1	2	3
1	(Latvia) (Poland)	Ieva Irbe; Urszula Radwańska	3; 6	1; 6
2	(Latvia) (Poland)	Liene Liniņa; Agnieszka Radwańska	2; 6	1; 6
3	(Latvia) (Poland)	Ieva Irbe / Liene Liniņa; Klaudia Jans / Alicja Rosolska	0; 6	4; 6

== Portugal vs. Greece ==
Portugal
2
Club Ali Bey, Manavgat, Antalya, Turkey
28 April 2006
Red clay (outdoors)

Greece
1

			1	2	3
1	(Portugal) (Greece)	Ana Catarina Nogueira; Anna Gerasimou	2; 6	6; 3	4; 6
2	(Portugal) (Greece)	Magali de Lattre; Anna Koumantou	6; 2	6; 3
3	(Portugal) (Greece)	Ana Catarina Nogueira / Neuza Silva; Anna Gerasimou / Anna Koumantou	6; 2	3; 6	6; 4

== See also ==
- Fed Cup structure
