= Cercel =

Cercel is a Romanian surname (literally "Earring"). Notable people with the surname include:

- Alina Cercel-Tecșor (born 1979), tennis player
- Marcu Cercel (1580–1629), Prince of Moldavia from July to September 1600
- Petru Cercel (died 1590), Prince of Wallachia from 1583 to 1585
