= 2017 Fed Cup Europe/Africa Zone Group I – Pool A =

Subsection of tennis competition

Pool A of the 2017 Fed Cup Europe/Africa Zone Group I was one of four pools in the Europe/Africa zone of the 2017 Fed Cup. Three teams competed in a round robin competition, with the top team and the bottom team proceeding to their respective sections of the play-offs: the top team played for advancement to the World Group II Play-offs, while the bottom team faced potential relegation to Group II.

== Standings ==
		POL	GEO	AUT	RR; W–L	Set; W–L	Game; W–L	Standings
18	Poland		2–1	2–1	2–0	9–5 (64%)	69–62 (53%)	1
30	Georgia	1–2		1–2	0–1	5–8 (38%)	60–63 (49%)	3
47	Austria	1–2	2–1		1–1	6–7 (46%)	61–65 (48%)	2

Standings are determined by: 1. number of wins; 2. number of matches; 3. in two-team ties, head-to-head records; 4. in three-team ties, (a) percentage of sets won (head-to-head records if two teams remain tied), then (b) percentage of games won (head-to-head records if two teams remain tied), then (c) Fed Cup rankings.

== Round-robin ==
=== Poland vs. Austria ===
Poland
2
Tallink Tennis Centre, Tallinn, Estonia
8 February 2017
Hard (indoors)

Austria
1

			1	2	3
1	(Poland) (Austria)	Katarzyna Piter; Tamira Paszek	6; 2	6; 4
2	(Poland) (Austria)	Magda Linette; Barbara Haas	4; 6	6; 4	5; 7
3	(Poland) (Austria)	Paula Kania / Katarzyna Piter; Julia Grabher / Tamira Paszek	6; 3	6; 2

=== Georgia vs. Austria ===
Georgia
1
Tallink Tennis Centre, Tallinn, Estonia
9 February 2017
Hard (indoors)

Austria
2

			1	2	3
1	(Georgia (country)) (Austria)	Ekaterine Gorgodze; Julia Grabher	7; 5	6; 3
2	(Georgia (country)) (Austria)	Sofia Shapatava; Barbara Haas	4; 6	1; 6
3	(Georgia (country)) (Austria)	Oksana Kalashnikova / Sofia Shapatava; Julia Grabher / Barbara Haas	3; 6	5; 7

=== Poland vs. Georgia ===
Poland
2
Tallink Tennis Centre, Tallinn, Estonia
10 February 2017
Hard (indoors)

Georgia
1

			1	2	3
1	(Poland) (Georgia (country))	Katarzyna Piter; Ekaterine Gorgodze	5; 7	6; 2	6; 4
2	(Poland) (Georgia (country))	Magda Linette; Sofia Shapatava	7; 5	6; 4
3	(Poland) (Georgia (country))	Magdalena Fręch / Paula Kania; Oksana Kalashnikova / Sofia Shapatava				w/o
