= 2013 Fed Cup Europe/Africa Zone Group I – Pool C =

Group C of the 2013 Fed Cup Europe/Africa Zone Group I was one of four pools in the Europe/Africa zone of the 2013 Fed Cup. Four teams competed in a round robin competition, with the top team and the bottom team proceeding to their respective sections of the play-offs: the top team played for advancement to the World Group II Play-offs, while the bottom team faced potential relegation to Group II.

== Standings ==
		(Poland) POL	(Romania) ROM	(Israel) ISR	(Turkey) TUR	RR; W–L	Match; W–L	Set; W–L	Game; W–L	Standings
23	Poland		2–1	2–1	3–0	3–0	7–2	14–6	111–81	1
26	Romania	1–2		2–1	1–2	1–2	4–5	8–10	75–86	3
36	Israel	1–2	1–2		2–1	1–2	4–5	9–11	82–97	2
49	Turkey	0–3	2–1	1–2		1–2	3–6	8–12	87–91	4

== Round-robin ==
=== Israel vs. Turkey ===
Israel
2
Municipal Tennis Club, Eilat, Israel
6 February 2013
Hard (outdoors)

Turkey
1

			1	2	3
1	(Israel) (Turkey)	Julia Glushko; Pemra Özgen	6; 4	6; 4
2	(Israel) (Turkey)	Shahar Pe'er; Çağla Büyükakçay	1; 6	6; 1	7^{7} 6^{3}
3	(Israel) (Turkey)	Valeria Patiuk / Keren Shlomo; Başak Eraydın / İpek Soylu	2; 6	1; 6

=== Poland vs. Romania ===
Poland
2
Municipal Tennis Club, Eilat, Israel
6 February 2013
Hard (outdoors)

Romania
1

			1	2	3
1	(Poland) (Romania)	Urszula Radwańska; Cristina Dinu	7; 5	6; 2
2	(Poland) (Romania)	Agnieszka Radwańska; Sorana Cîrstea	6; 3	6; 4
3	(Poland) (Romania)	Paula Kania / Alicja Rosolska; Sorana Cîrstea / Raluca Olaru	6^{10} 7^{12}	2; 6

=== Romania vs. Israel ===
Romania
2
Municipal Tennis Club, Eilat, Israel
7 February 2013
Hard (outdoors)

Israel
1

			1	2	3
1	(Romania) (Israel)	Cristina Dinu; Julia Glushko	1; 6	2; 6
2	(Romania) (Israel)	Sorana Cîrstea; Shahar Pe'er	6; 2	7^{7} 6^{4}
3	(Romania) (Israel)	Sorana Cîrstea / Raluca Olaru; Julia Glushko / Shahar Pe'er	6; 2	6; 1

=== Poland vs. Turkey ===
Poland
3
Municipal Tennis Club, Eilat, Israel
7 February 2013
Hard (outdoors)

Turkey
0

			1	2	3
1	(Poland) (Turkey)	Urszula Radwańska; Pemra Özgen	6; 2	4; 6	6; 2
2	(Poland) (Turkey)	Agnieszka Radwańska; Çağla Büyükakçay	6; 1	6; 2
3	(Poland) (Turkey)	Paula Kania / Alicja Rosolska; Başak Eraydın / İpek Soylu	7; 5	7^{7} 6^{4}

=== Poland vs. Israel ===
Poland
2
Municipal Tennis Club, Eilat, Israel
8 February 2013
Hard (outdoors)

Israel
1

			1	2	3
1	(Poland) (Israel)	Urszula Radwańska; Julia Glushko	4; 6	4; 6
2	(Poland) (Israel)	Agnieszka Radwańska; Shahar Pe'er	6; 2	6; 3
3	(Poland) (Israel)	Agnieszka Radwańska / Urszula Radwańska; Julia Glushko / Shahar Pe'er	4; 6	6; 3	6; 4

=== Romania vs. Turkey ===
Romania
1
Municipal Tennis Club, Eilat, Israel
8 February 2013
Hard (outdoors)

Turkey
2

			1	2	3
1	(Romania) (Turkey)	Cristina Dinu; Başak Eraydın	2; 6	4; 6
2	(Romania) (Turkey)	Sorana Cîrstea; Çağla Büyükakçay	6; 4	6; 2
3	(Romania) (Turkey)	Sorana Cîrstea / Raluca Olaru; Çağla Büyükakçay / Pemra Özgen	2; 4			retired
