= 2009 Fed Cup Europe/Africa Zone Group I – Pool B =

Group B of the 2009 Fed Cup Europe/Africa Zone Group I was one of four pools in the Europe/Africa Zone Group I of the 2009 Fed Cup. Four teams competed in a round robin competition, with the top team and the bottom team proceeding to their respective sections of the play-offs: the top team played for advancement to the World Group II Play-offs, while the bottom team faced potential relegation to Group II.

		(Sweden) SWE	(Romania) ROU	(Poland) POL	(Bosnia and Herzegovina) BIH	RR; W–L	Set; W–L	Game; W–L	Standings
25	Sweden		3–0	0–3	3–0	2–1	11–8	96–75	2
32	Romania	0–3		1–2	3–0	1–2	10–8	87–80	3
38	Poland	3–0	2–1		2–1	3–0	15–6	109–70	1
46	Bosnia and Herzegovina	0–3	0–3	1–2		0–3	3–17	49–116	4

== Sweden vs. Bosnia and Herzegovina ==
Sweden
3
Coral Tennis Club, Tallinn, Estonia
4 February 2009
Greenset hard (indoors)

Bosnia and Herzegovina
0

			1	2	3
1	(Sweden) (Bosnia and Herzegovina)	Johanna Larsson; Sandra Martinović	6; 1	6; 1
2	(Sweden) (Bosnia and Herzegovina)	Sofia Arvidsson; Mervana Jugić-Salkić	6; 2	6; 3
3	(Sweden) (Bosnia and Herzegovina)	Sofia Arvidsson / Johanna Larsson; Anita Husarić / Dijana Stojić	6; 0	6; 1

== Romania vs. Poland ==
Romania
1
Coral Tennis Club, Tallinn, Estonia
4 February 2009
Greenset hard (indoors)

Poland
2

			1	2	3
1	(Romania) (Poland)	Monica Niculescu; Katarzyna Piter	6; 1	6; 4
2	(Romania) (Poland)	Sorana Cîrstea; Agnieszka Radwańska	1; 6	3; 6
3	(Romania) (Poland)	Sorana Cîrstea / Monica Niculescu; Klaudia Jans / Alicja Rosolska	4; 6	0; 6

== Sweden vs. Poland ==
Sweden
0
Coral Tennis Club, Tallinn, Estonia
4 February 2009
Greenset hard (indoors)

Poland
3

			1	2	3
1	(Sweden) (Poland)	Johanna Larsson; Katarzyna Piter	4; 6	6; 1	4; 6
2	(Sweden) (Poland)	Sofia Arvidsson; Agnieszka Radwańska	2; 6	3; 6
3	(Sweden) (Poland)	Sofia Arvidsson / Johanna Larsson; Klaudia Jans / Alicja Rosolska	4; 6	2; 6

== Romania vs. Bosnia and Herzegovina ==
Romania
3
Coral Tennis Club, Tallinn, Estonia
5 February 2009
Greenset hard (indoors)

Bosnia and Herzegovina
0

			1	2	3
1	(Romania) (Bosnia and Herzegovina)	Monica Niculescu; Sandra Martinović	6; 2	6; 2
2	(Romania) (Bosnia and Herzegovina)	Sorana Cîrstea; Mervana Jugić-Salkić	6; 3	7^{7} 6^{3}
3	(Romania) (Bosnia and Herzegovina)	Sorana Cîrstea / Raluca Olaru; Mervana Jugić-Salkić / Sandra Martinović	6; 1	6; 2

== Sweden vs. Romania ==
Sweden
3
Coral Tennis Club, Tallinn, Estonia
6 February 2009
Greenset hard (indoors)

Romania
0

			1	2	3
1	(Sweden) (Romania)	Johanna Larsson; Monica Niculescu	1; 6	7^{7} 6^{1}	6; 3
2	(Sweden) (Romania)	Sofia Arvidsson; Sorana Cîrstea	6^{5} 7^{7}	6; 2	7; 5
3	(Sweden) (Romania)	Ellen Allgurin / Sandra Roma; Mihaela Buzărnescu / Sorana Cîrstea	2; 1			retired

== Poland vs. Bosnia and Herzegovina ==
Poland
2
Coral Tennis Club, Tallinn, Estonia
6 February 2009
Greenset hard (indoors)

Bosnia and Herzegovina
1

			1	2	3
1	(Poland) (Bosnia and Herzegovina)	Katarzyna Piter; Dijana Stojić	6; 1	6; 1
2	(Poland) (Bosnia and Herzegovina)	Agnieszka Radwańska; Mervana Jugić-Salkić	6; 1	4; 6	6^{5} 7^{7}
3	(Poland) (Bosnia and Herzegovina)	Klaudia Jans / Katarzyna Piter; Mervana Jugić-Salkić / Sandra Martinović	6; 3	3; 6	6; 0

== See also ==
- Fed Cup structure
