= 2001 Fed Cup Europe/Africa Zone Group I – Pool C =

Group C of the 2001 Fed Cup Europe/Africa Zone Group I was one of four pools in the Europe/Africa Zone Group I of the 2001 Fed Cup. Four teams competed in a round robin competition, with the top team advancing to the play-offs and the bottom team being relegated to Group II for 2002.

	(Sweden) SWE	(Belarus) BLR	(Romania) ROU	(United Kingdom) GBR	RR; W–L	Set; W–L	Game; W–L	Standings
Sweden		3–0	2–1	3–0	3–0	16–3	109–60	1
Belarus	0–3		2–1	2–1	2–1	9–12	94–104	2
Romania	1–2	1–2		2–1	1–2	12–9	99–96	3
Great Britain	0–3	1–2	1–2		0–3	5–16	72–114	4

== Sweden vs. Great Britain ==
Sweden
3
Murcia, Spain
24 May 2001
Red clay (outdoors)

Great Britain
0

			1	2	3
1	(Sweden) (United Kingdom)	Sofia Arvidsson; Anne Keothavong	6; 0	6; 2
2	(Sweden) (United Kingdom)	Åsa Carlsson; Louise Latimer	6; 0	6; 4
3	(Sweden) (United Kingdom)	Åsa Carlsson / Maria Wolfbrandt; Julie Pullin / Lorna Woodroffe	6; 1	6; 4

== Belarus vs. Romania ==
Belarus
2
Murcia, Spain
24 May 2001
Red clay (outdoors)

Romania
1

			1	2	3
1	(Belarus) (Romania)	Olga Barabanschikova; Edina Gallovits	3; 6	4; 6
2	(Belarus) (Romania)	Tatiana Poutchek; Ioana Gaspar	6; 4	4; 6	6; 3
3	(Belarus) (Romania)	Nadejda Ostrovskaya / Tatiana Poutchek; Raluca Ciochină / Edina Gallovits	6; 3	6; 3

== Sweden vs. Belarus ==
Sweden
3
Murcia, Spain
25 May 2001
Red clay (outdoors)

Belarus
0

			1	2	3
1	(Sweden) (Belarus)	Sofia Arvidsson; Nadejda Ostrovskaya	6; 1	6; 4
2	(Sweden) (Belarus)	Åsa Carlsson; Tatiana Poutchek	6; 4	6; 0
3	(Sweden) (Belarus)	Åsa Carlsson / Maria Wolfbrandt; Olga Barabanschikova / Elena Yaryshka	7; 5	6; 2

== Romania vs. Great Britain ==
Romania
2
Murcia, Spain
25 May 2001
Red clay (outdoors)

Great Britain
1

			1	2	3
1	(Romania) (United Kingdom)	Edina Gallovits; Anne Keothavong	6; 2	6; 2
2	(Romania) (United Kingdom)	Ioana Gaspar; Julie Pullin	7^{7} 6^{4}	6; 2
3	(Romania) (United Kingdom)	Edina Gallovits / Ioana Gaspar; Julie Pullin / Lorna Woodroffe	1; 6	6; 3	6; 1

== Sweden vs. Romania ==
Sweden
2
Murcia, Spain
26 May 2001
Red clay (outdoors)

Romania
1

			1	2	3
1	(Sweden) (Romania)	Sofia Arvidsson; Edina Gallovits	0; 6	6^{2} 7^{7}
2	(Sweden) (Romania)	Åsa Carlsson; Ioana Gaspar	6; 1	6; 3
3	(Sweden) (Romania)	Åsa Carlsson / Maria Wolfbrandt; Edina Gallovits / Ioana Gaspar	6; 3	3; 6	9; 7

== Belarus vs. Great Britain ==
Belarus
2
Murcia, Spain
26 May 2001
Red clay (outdoors)

Great Britain
1

			1	2	3
1	(Belarus) (United Kingdom)	Nadejda Ostrovskaya; Anne Keothavong	6; 4	6; 1
2	(Belarus) (United Kingdom)	Tatiana Poutchek; Louise Latimer	6; 2	6^{6} 7^{8}	3; 6
3	(Belarus) (United Kingdom)	Olga Barabanschikova / Tatiana Poutchek; Julie Pullin / Lorna Woodroffe	2; 6	6; 4	8; 6

- Great Britain failed to win any ties in the pool, and thus was relegated to Group II in 2001, where they achieved promotion back to Group I for 2002.

== See also ==
- Fed Cup structure
