= 2001 Fed Cup Europe/Africa Zone Group I – Pool B =

Group B of the 2001 Fed Cup Europe/Africa Zone Group I was one of four pools in the Europe/Africa Zone Group I of the 2001 Fed Cup. Four teams competed in a round robin competition, with the top team advancing to the play-offs and the bottom team being relegated down to Group II for 2002.

	(Slovenia) SLO	(Ukraine) UKR	(Estonia) EST	(South Africa) RSA	RR; W–L	Set; W–L	Game; W–L	Standings
Slovenia		2–1	3–0	2–1	3–0	15–6	111–76	1
Ukraine	1–2		2–1	2–1	2–1	12–10	104–97	2
Estonia	0–3	1–2		2–1	1–2	8–14	89–106	3
South Africa	1–2	1–2	1–2		0–3	9–14	95–120	4

== Slovenia vs. Estonia ==
Slovenia
3
Murcia, Spain
24 May 2001
Red clay (outdoors)

Estonia
0

			1	2	3
1	(Slovenia) (Estonia)	Katarina Srebotnik; Kaia Kanepi	1; 6	6; 1	6; 2
2	(Slovenia) (Estonia)	Tina Križan; Maret Ani	6; 1	7; 5
3	(Slovenia) (Estonia)	Maja Matevžič / Petra Rampre; Maret Ani / Kaia Kanepi	7; 5	6; 1

== Ukraine vs. South Africa ==
Ukraine
2
Murcia, Spain
24 May 2001
Red clay (outdoors)

South Africa
1

			1	2	3
1	(Ukraine) (South Africa)	Tatiana Kovalchuk; Natalie Grandin	7^{17} 6^{15}	6; 4
2	(Ukraine) (South Africa)	Tatiana Perebiynis; Joannette Kruger	6; 1	3; 6	5; 7
3	(Ukraine) (South Africa)	Tatiana Perebiynis / Elena Tatarkova; Kim Grant / Joannette Kruger	5; 7	6; 1	6; 1

== Slovenia vs. Ukraine ==
Slovenia
2
Murcia, Spain
25 May 2001
Red clay (outdoors)

Ukraine
1

			1	2	3
1	(Slovenia) (Ukraine)	Katarina Srebotnik; Tatiana Kovalchuk	6; 3	6; 3
2	(Slovenia) (Ukraine)	Tina Križan; Tatiana Perebiynis	6; 4	6; 1
3	(Slovenia) (Ukraine)	Tina Križan / Katarina Srebotnik; Tatiana Perebiynis / Elena Tatarkova	2; 6	3; 6

== Estonia vs. South Africa ==
Estonia
2
Murcia, Spain
25 May 2001
Red clay (outdoors)

South Africa
1

			1	2	3
1	(Estonia) (South Africa)	Kaia Kanepi; Natalie Grandin	6; 1	6; 2
2	(Estonia) (South Africa)	Margit Rüütel; Joannette Kruger	2; 6	4; 6
3	(Estonia) (South Africa)	Maret Ani / Kaia Kanepi; Kim Grant / Joannette Kruger	2; 6	6; 4	7; 5

== Slovenia vs. South Africa ==
Slovenia
2
Murcia, Spain
26 May 2001
Red clay (outdoors)

South Africa
1

			1	2	3
1	(Slovenia) (South Africa)	Maja Matevžič; Natalie Grandin	4; 6	6; 4	6; 2
2	(Slovenia) (South Africa)	Tina Križan; Joannette Kruger	6; 1	7; 5
3	(Slovenia) (South Africa)	Maja Matevžič / Tina Križan; Kim Grant / Mareze Joubert	4; 6	6; 2	4; 6

== Ukraine vs. Estonia ==
Ukraine
2
Murcia, Spain
26 May 2001
Red clay (outdoors)

Estonia
1

			1	2	3
1	(Ukraine) (Estonia)	Tatiana Kovalchuk; Kaia Kanepi	6; 4	2; 6	6; 4
2	(Ukraine) (Estonia)	Tatiana Perebiynis; Margit Rüütel	6; 4	6; 4
3	(Ukraine) (Estonia)	Yuliya Beygelzimer / Elena Tatarkova; Ilona Poljakova / Margit Rüütel	6; 1	3; 6	2; 6

- South Africa failed to win any ties in the pool, and thus was relegated to Group II in 2001, where they achieved promotion back to Group I for 2002.

== See also ==
- Fed Cup structure
