= Poland Billie Jean King Cup team =

Polish women's tennis team

Poland
- Captain: Dawid Celt
- Nations Ranking: 9 ▼2 (13 April 2026)
- Highest ranking: 6 (22 April 2014)
- Colors: red & white
- First year: 1966
- Years played: 44
- Ties played (W–L): 142 (76-66)
- Years in World Group: 19 (10–22)
- Best finish: World Group SF (2024)
- Most total wins: Agnieszka Radwańska (42–11)
- Most singles wins: Agnieszka Radwańska (34–9)
- Most doubles wins: Alicja Rosolska (28–13)
- Best doubles team: Klaudia Jans-Ignacik / Alicja Rosolska (14–8)
- Most ties played: Alicja Rosolska (41)
- Most years played: Alicja Rosolska (16)

The Poland Billie Jean King Cup team represents Poland in the Billie Jean King Cup tennis competition and are governed by the Polski Związek Tenisowy.

== Current Team (2026) ==
- Linda Klimovičová
- Martyna Kubka
- Gina Feistel
- Weronika Falkowska
- Maja Chwalińska

The team currently competes in the 2026 Billie Jean King Cup play-offs.

== Former Team ==
- Iga Świątek
- Magda Linette
- Magdalena Fręch
- Katarzyna Kawa
- Alicja Rosolska
- Weronika Ewald (2023, did not play)

Poland defeated Czech Republic in a quarterfinal tie at the 2024 Billie Jean King Cup, after Iga Świątek won in singles and doubles in Málaga, Spain. Poland made the semifinals of the Billie Jean King Cup Finals for the first time in their nation's history. In the semifinal they lost to Italy, the eventual champions. "The whole team did an amazing job", Iga Świątek said on court. "I'm going to ask Katarzyna Kawa to teach me these forehands down the line, they're amazing." It was a big win for Katarzyna Kawa, who became 4–3 in doubles at the Billie Jean King Cup in her career. She also turned 32 years old during her doubles victory.

== History ==
Poland competed in its first Fed Cup in 1966. Their best result was reaching the semifinal in the 2024 Billie Jean King Cup. Poland also reached quarterfinals in 1992 and 2015.

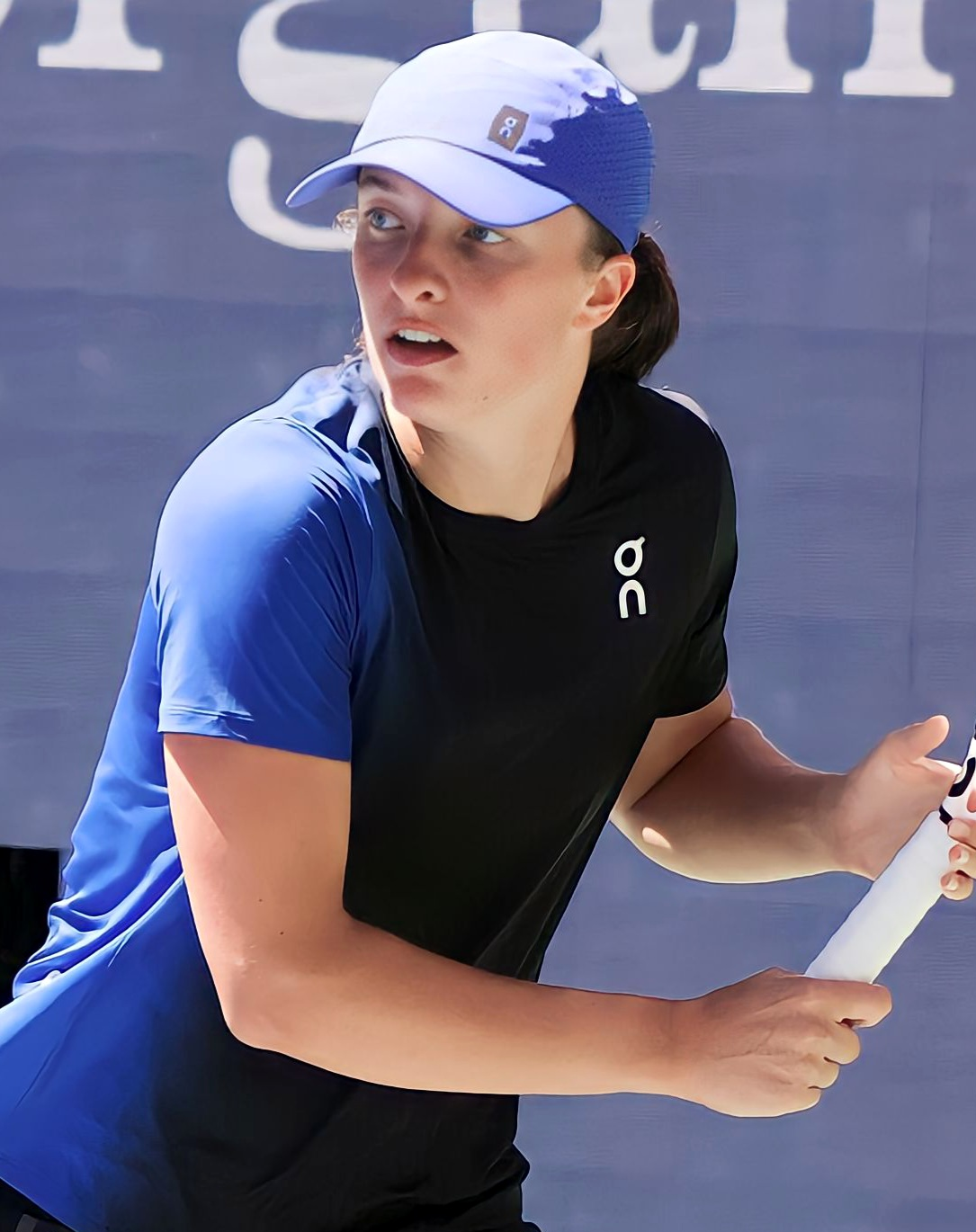
Iga Świątek

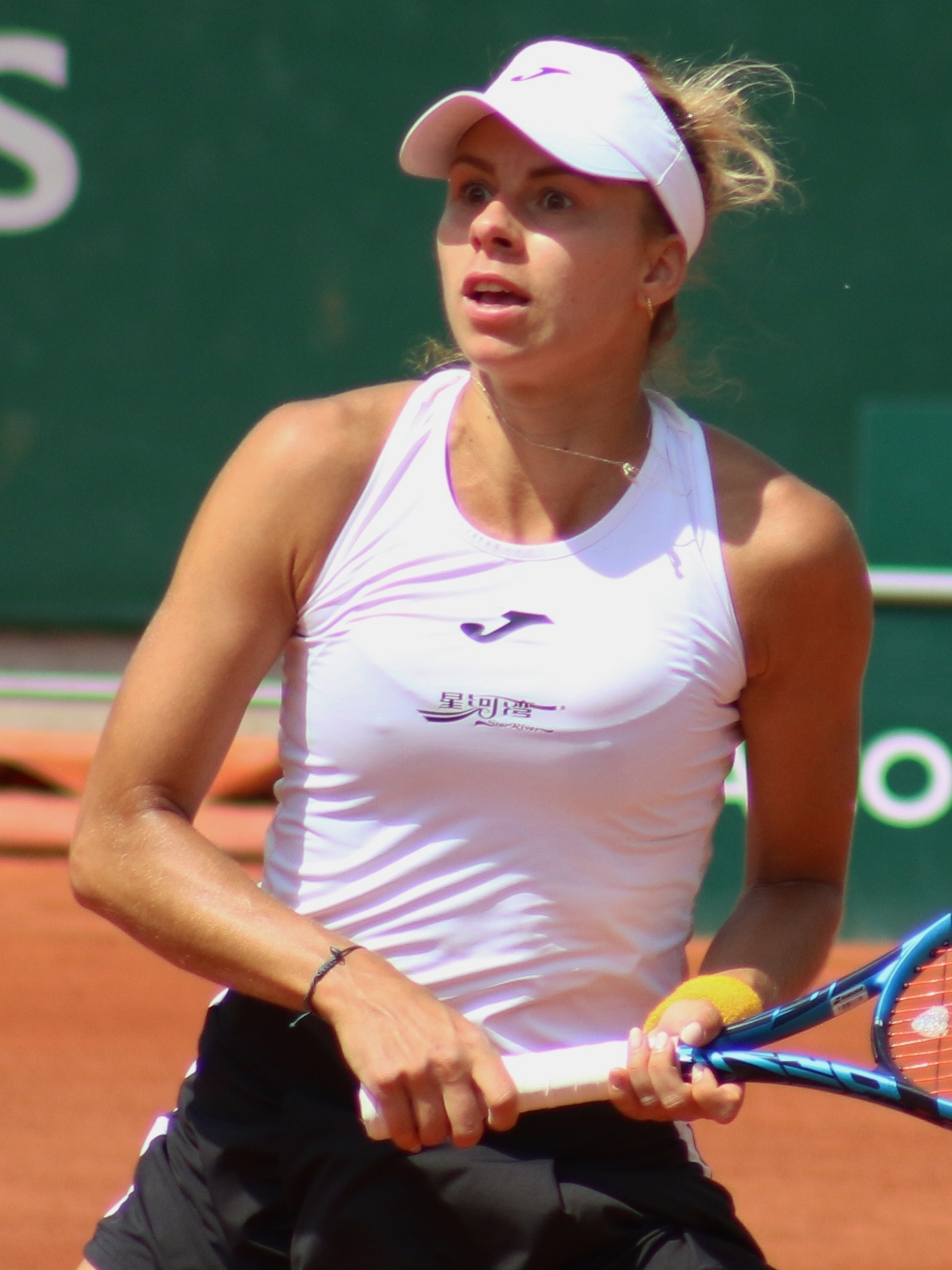
Magda Linette

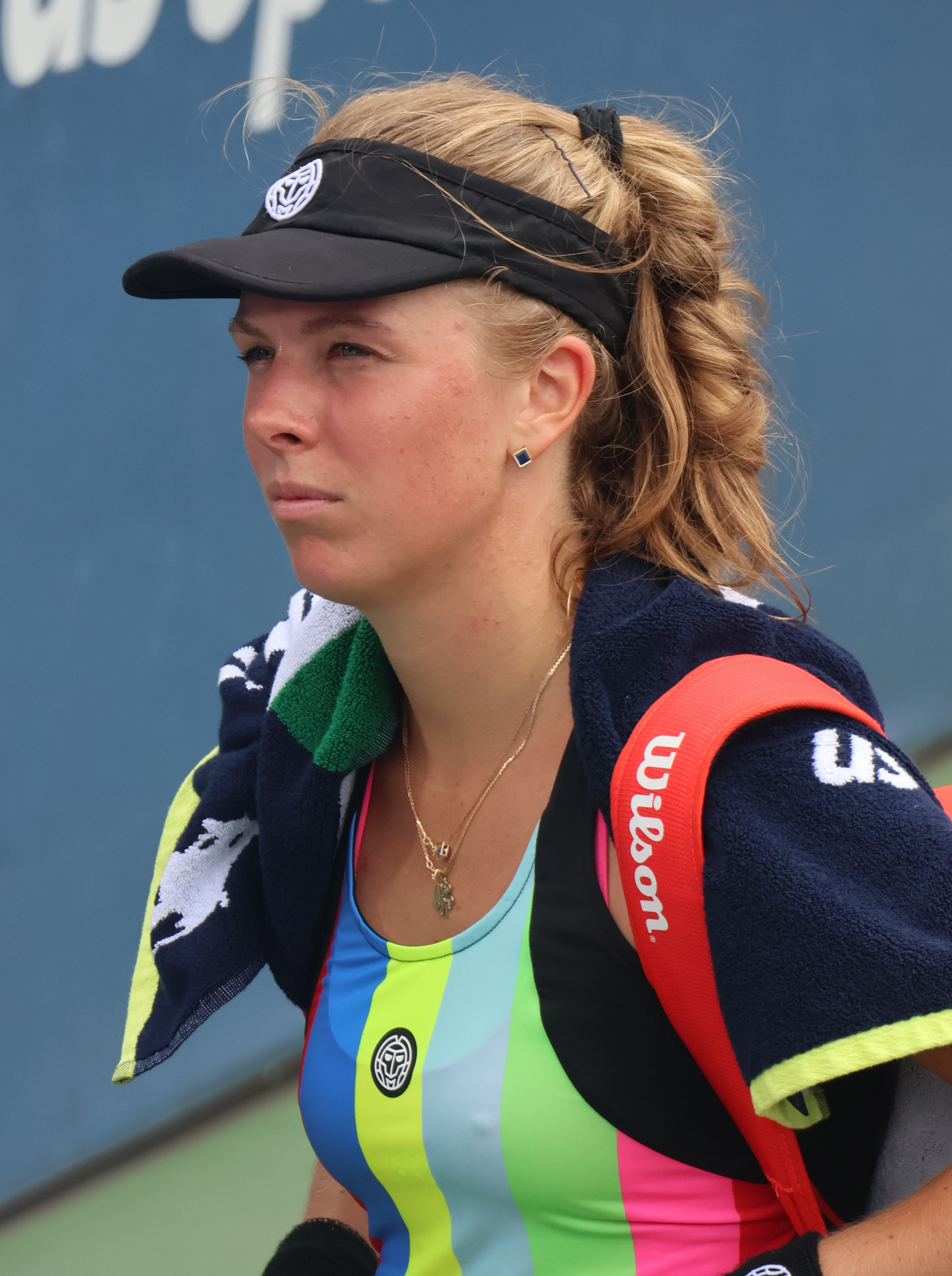
Magdalena Frech

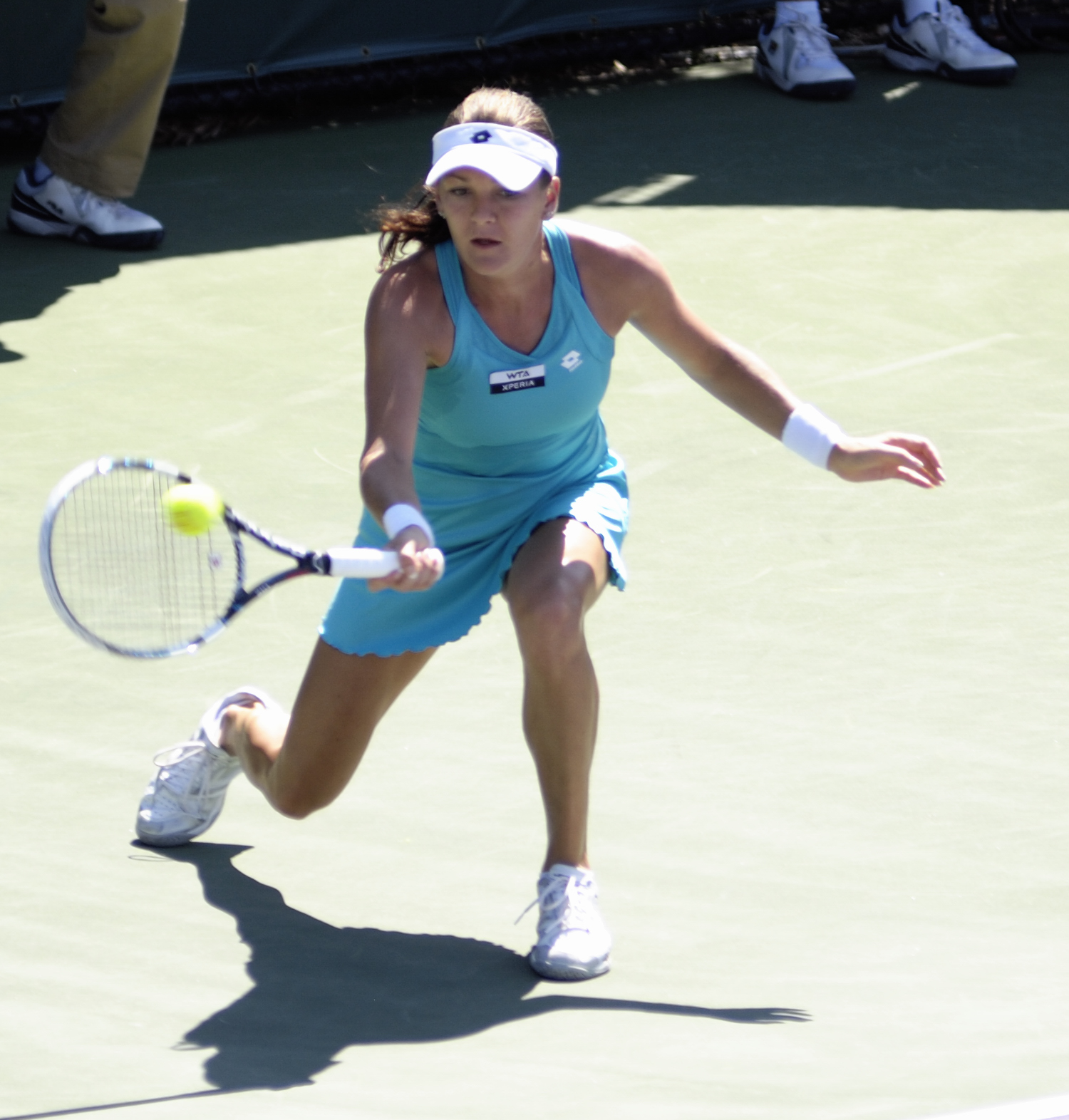
Agnieszka Radwańska

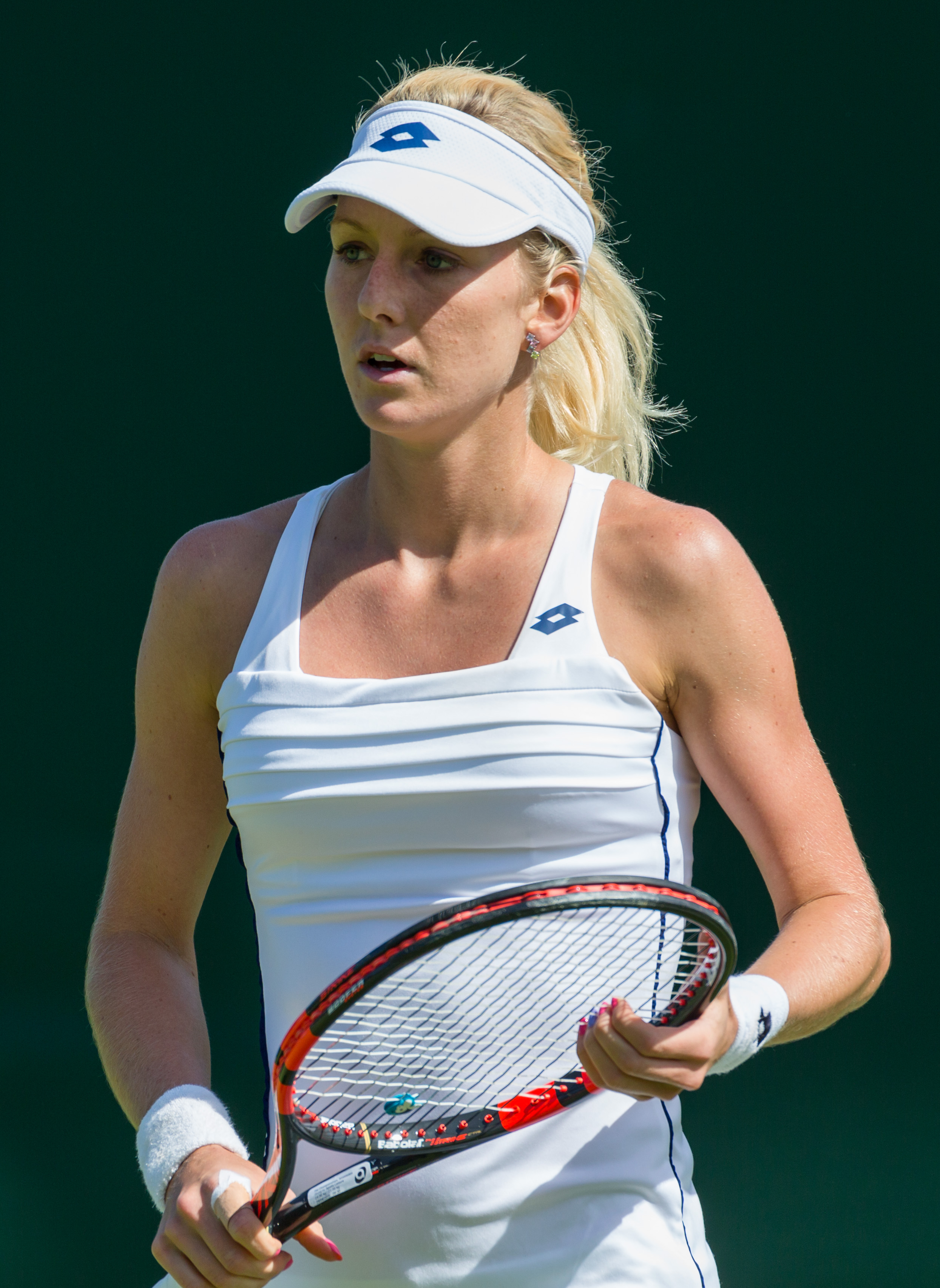
Urszula Radwańska

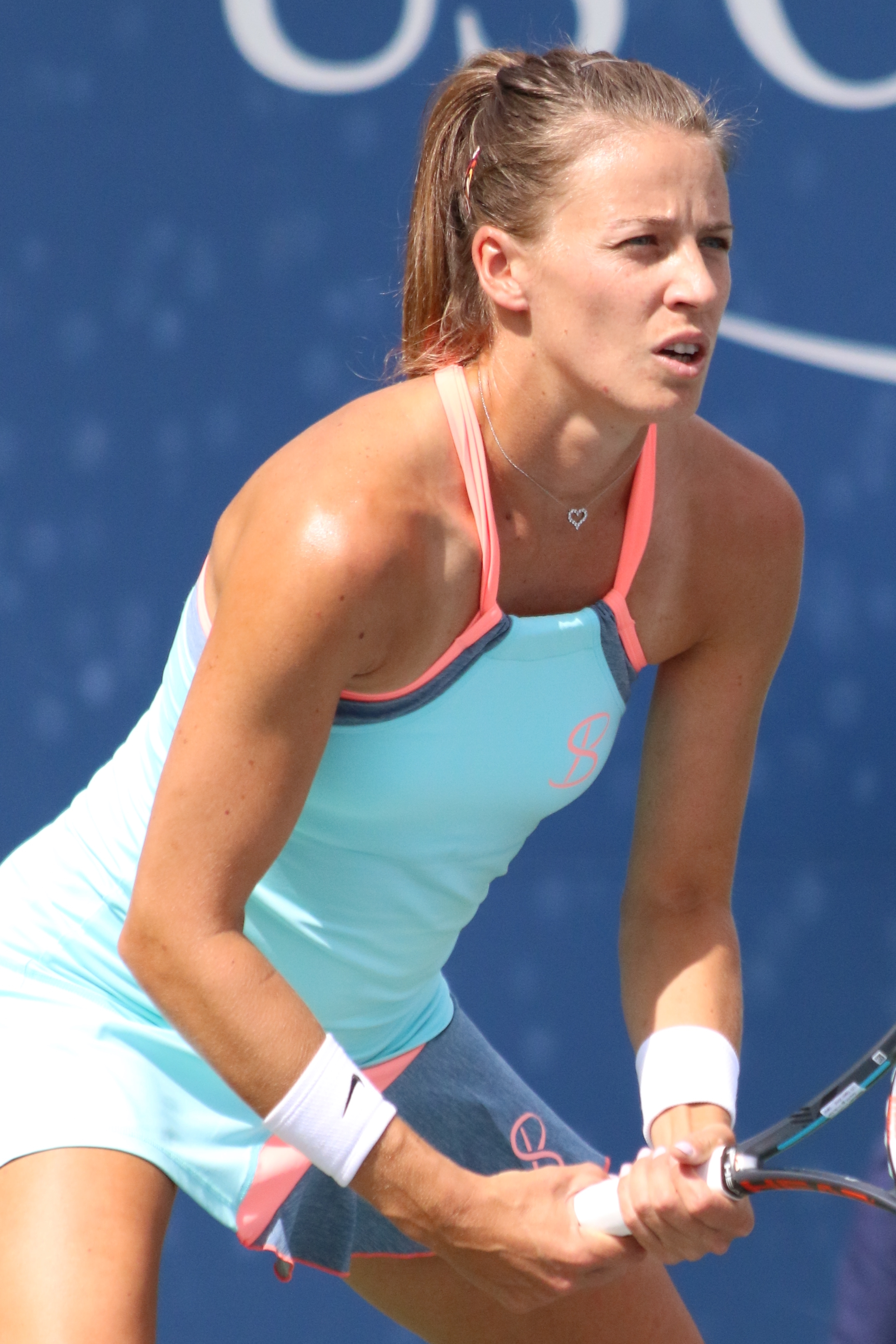
Alicja Rosolska

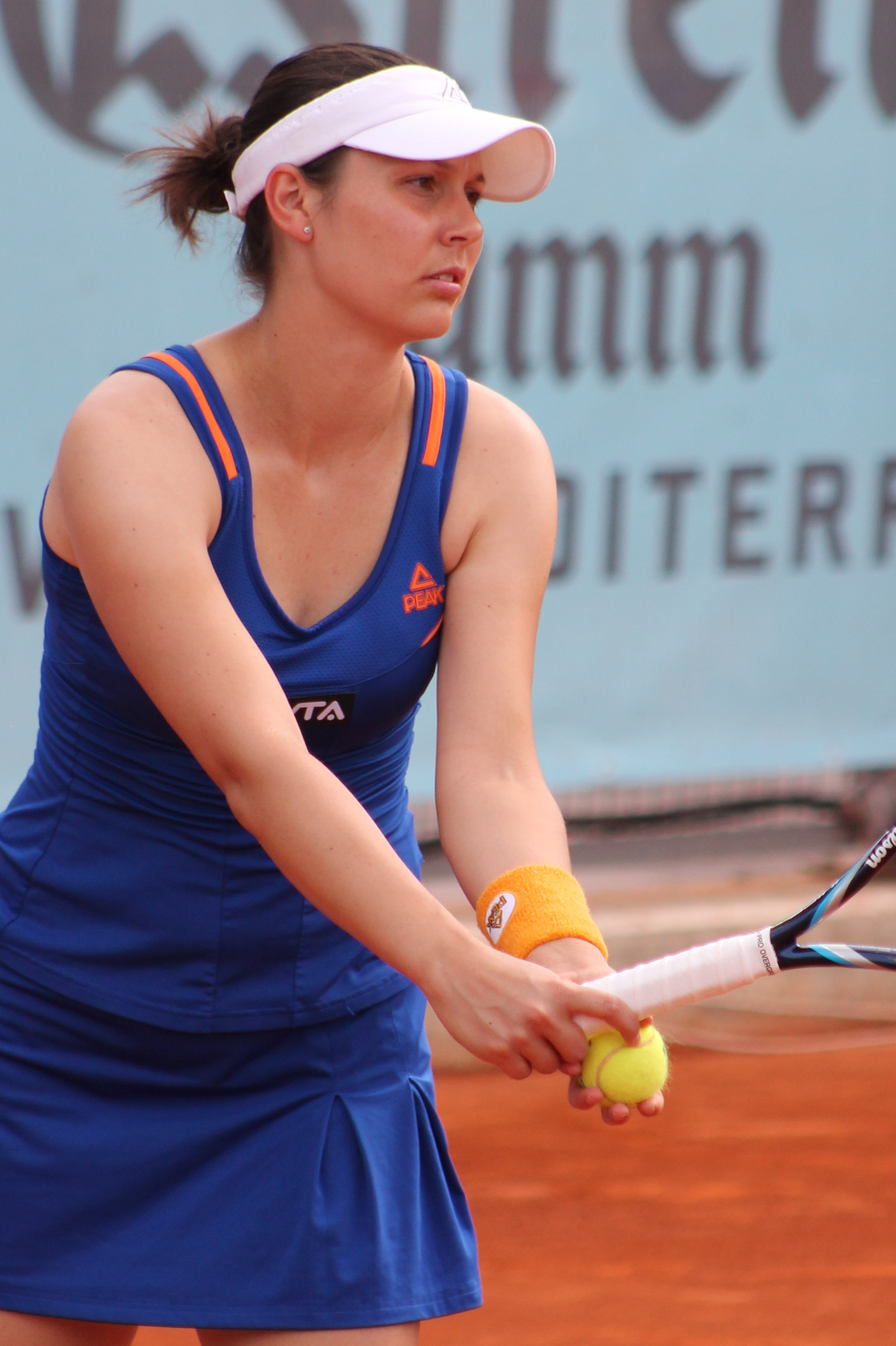
Klaudia Jans-Ignacik

Legend
World Group / Finals
World Group Play-off / Qualifying Round
World Group II / Qualifying Round Play-offs
World Group II Play-off
Europe/Africa Group

=== 2020–2029 ===
Edition	Round	Date	Against	Surface	Team Result
2026 Billie Jean King Cup	Play-Offs	November 2026			
2026 Billie Jean King Cup	Qualifying Round	10-11 April 2026; Gliwice, Poland	Ukraine	Clay (i)	Loss 0-4
2025 Billie Jean King Cup	Play-Offs	14-16 November 2025; Gorzów Wielkopolski, Poland	New Zealand	Hard (i)	Win 3–0
2025 Billie Jean King Cup	Play-Offs	14-16 November 2025; Gorzów Wielkopolski, Poland	Romania	Hard (i)	Win 3–0
2025 Billie Jean King Cup	Qualifying Round	10-11 April 2025; Radom, Poland	Ukraine	Clay (i)	Loss 0-3
2025 Billie Jean King Cup	Qualifying Round	10-11 April 2025; Radom, Poland	Switzerland	Clay (i)	Win 3-0
2024 Billie Jean King Cup	Finals	14-20 November 2024; Málaga, Spain	Italy	Hard (i)	Loss 1–2
2024 Billie Jean King Cup	Finals	14-20 November 2024; Málaga, Spain	Czech Republic	Hard (i)	Win 2–1
2024 Billie Jean King Cup	Finals	14-20 November 2024; Málaga, Spain	Spain	Hard (i)	Win 2–0
2024 Billie Jean King Cup	Qualifying Round	12-13 April 2024; Biel/Bienne, Switzerland	Switzerland	Hard (i)	Win 4–0
2023 Billie Jean King Cup	Finals	7-12 November 2023; Seville, Spain	Canada	Hard (i)	Loss 0–3
2023 Billie Jean King Cup	Finals	7-12 November 2023; Seville, Spain	Spain	Hard (i)	Loss 1–2
2023 Billie Jean King Cup	Qualifying Round	14-15 April 2023; Astana, Kazakhstan	Kazakhstan	Clay (i)	Loss 1–3
2022 Billie Jean King Cup	Finals	8-13 November 2022; Glasgow, United Kingdom	United States	Hard (i)	Loss 1–2
2022 Billie Jean King Cup	Finals	8-13 November 2022; Glasgow, United Kingdom	Czech Republic	Hard (i)	Loss 1–2
2022 Billie Jean King Cup	Qualifying round	15-16 April 2022; Radom, Poland	Romania	Hard (i)	Win 4–0
2020–21 Billie Jean King Cup	Play-offs	16-17 April 2021; Bytom, Poland	Brazil	Hard (i)	Win 3–2
2020–21 Billie Jean King Cup	Europe/Africa Group I	5-8 February 2020; Esch-sur-Alzette, Luxembourg	Slovenia	Hard (i)	Win 2–0
2020–21 Billie Jean King Cup	Europe/Africa Group I	5-8 February 2020; Esch-sur-Alzette, Luxembourg	Sweden	Hard (i)	Win 2–1
2020–21 Billie Jean King Cup	Europe/Africa Group I	5-8 February 2020; Esch-sur-Alzette, Luxembourg	Turkey	Hard (i)	Win 3–0

=== 2010–2019 ===
Edition	Round	Date	Against	Surface	Team Result
2019 Fed Cup	Europe/Africa Group I	6–8 February 2019; Zielona Góra, Poland	Russia	Hard (i)	Loss 1–2
2019 Fed Cup	Europe/Africa Group I	6–8 February 2019; Zielona Góra, Poland	Denmark	Hard (i)	Win 3–0
2018 Fed Cup	Europe/Africa Group I	7–10 February 2018; Tallinn, Estonia	Austria	Hard (i)	Win 2–1
2018 Fed Cup	Europe/Africa Group I	7–10 February 2018; Tallinn, Estonia	Latvia	Hard (i)	Loss 2–1
2018 Fed Cup	Europe/Africa Group I	7–10 February 2018; Tallinn, Estonia	Turkey	Hard (i)	Win 2–1
2018 Fed Cup	Europe/Africa Group I	7–10 February 2018; Tallinn, Estonia	Bulgaria	Hard (i)	Win 2–0
2017 Fed Cup	Europe/Africa Group I	8–11 February 2017; Tallinn, Estonia	Austria	Hard (i)	Win 2–1
2017 Fed Cup	Europe/Africa Group I	8–11 February 2017; Tallinn, Estonia	Georgia	Hard (i)	Win 2–0
2017 Fed Cup	Europe/Africa Group I	8–11 February 2017; Tallinn, Estonia	Serbia	Hard (i)	Loss 2–1
2016 Fed Cup	World Group II Play-off	16–17 April 2016; Inowrocław, Poland	Chinese Taipei	Hard (i)	Lost 1–4
2016 Fed Cup	World Group II	06–7 February 2016; Kailua Kona, United States	United States	Hard	Loss 0–4
2015 Fed Cup	World Group play-off	18–19 April 2015; Zielona Góra, Poland	Switzerland	Hard (i)	Loss 2–3
2015 Fed Cup	World Group 1st round	9–10 February 2015; Kraków, Poland	Russia	Hard (i)	Loss 0–4
2014 Fed Cup	World Group play-off	19–20 April 2014; Barcelona, Spain	Spain	Clay	Win 3–2
2014 Fed Cup	World Group II	8–9 February 2014; Borås, Sweden	Sweden	Hard (i)	Win 3–2
2013 Fed Cup	World Group II play-off	20–21 April 2013; Koksijde, Belgium	Belgium	Hard (i)	Win 4–1
2013 Fed Cup	Europe/Africa Group I	6–9 February 2013; Eilat, Israel	Croatia	Hard	Win 2–1
2013 Fed Cup	Europe/Africa Group I	6–9 February 2013; Eilat, Israel	Israel	Hard	Win 2–1
2013 Fed Cup	Europe/Africa Group I	6–9 February 2013; Eilat, Israel	Turkey	Hard	Win 3–0
2013 Fed Cup	Europe/Africa Group I	6–9 February 2013; Eilat, Israel	Romania	Hard	Win 2–1
2012 Fed Cup	Europe/Africa Group I	1–4 February 2012; Eilat, Israel	Sweden	Hard	Lost 1–2
2012 Fed Cup	Europe/Africa Group I	1–4 February 2012; Eilat, Israel	Romania	Hard	Win 2–1
2012 Fed Cup	Europe/Africa Group I	1–4 February 2012; Eilat, Israel	Croatia	Hard	Win 3–0
2012 Fed Cup	Europe/Africa Group I	1–4 February 2012; Eilat, Israel	Luxembourg	Hard	Win 3–0
2011 Fed Cup	Europe/Africa Group I	2–5 February 2011; Eilat, Israel	Belarus	Hard	Lost 0–2
2011 Fed Cup	Europe/Africa Group I	2–5 February 2011; Eilat, Israel	Luxembourg	Hard	Win 2–1
2011 Fed Cup	Europe/Africa Group I	2–5 February 2011; Eilat, Israel	Israel	Hard	Win 2–1
2011 Fed Cup	Europe/Africa Group I	2–5 February 2011; Eilat, Israel	Bulgaria	Hard	Lost 1–2
2010 Fed Cup	World Group II play-off	24–25 April 2010; Sopot, Poland	Spain	Carpet (i)	Lost 1–4
2010 Fed Cup	World Group II	6–7 February 2010; Bydgoszcz, Poland	Belgium	Carpet (i)	Lost 2–3

=== 2000–2009 ===
Edition	Round	Date	Against	Surface	Team Result
2009 Fed Cup	World Group II play-off	25–26 April 2009; Gdynia, Poland	Japan	Clay	Win 3–2
2009 Fed Cup	Europe/Africa Group I	4–7 February 2009; Tallinn, Estonia	Great Britain	Hard (i)	Win 2–1
2009 Fed Cup	Europe/Africa Group I	4–7 February 2009; Tallinn, Estonia	Israel	Hard (i)	Win 2–1
2009 Fed Cup	Europe/Africa Group I	4–7 February 2009; Tallinn, Estonia	Sweden	Hard (i)	Win 3–0
2009 Fed Cup	Europe/Africa Group I	4–7 February 2009; Tallinn, Estonia	Romania	Hard (i)	Win 2–1
2008 Fed Cup	Europe/Africa Group I	30 January–1 February 2008; Budapest, Hungary	Georgia	Carpet (i)	Win 3–0
2008 Fed Cup	Europe/Africa Group I	30 January–1 February 2008; Budapest, Hungary	Serbia	Carpet (i)	Lost 1–2
2008 Fed Cup	Europe/Africa Group I	30 January–1 February 2008; Budapest, Hungary	Romania	Carpet (i)	Lost 0–3
2007 Fed Cup	Europe/Africa Group I	18–21 April 2007; Plovdiv, Bulgaria	Ukraine	Clay	Lost 1–2
2007 Fed Cup	Europe/Africa Group I	18–21 April 2007; Plovdiv, Bulgaria	Great Britain	Clay	Win 3–0
2007 Fed Cup	Europe/Africa Group I	18–21 April 2007; Plovdiv, Bulgaria	Bulgaria	Clay	Win 3–0
2007 Fed Cup	Europe/Africa Group I	18–21 April 2007; Plovdiv, Bulgaria	Luxembourg	Clay	Win 3–0
2006 Fed Cup	Europe/Africa Group II	26–29 April 2006; Antalya, Turkey	Georgia	Clay	Win 3–0
2006 Fed Cup	Europe/Africa Group II	26–29 April 2006; Antalya, Turkey	Latvia	Clay	Win 3–0
2006 Fed Cup	Europe/Africa Group II	26–29 April 2006; Antalya, Turkey	Greece	Clay	Win 3–0
2006 Fed Cup	Europe/Africa Group II	26–29 April 2006; Antalya, Turkey	Portugal	Clay	Win 3–0
2005 Fed Cup	Europe/Africa Group I	19–24 April 2005; Antalya, Turkey	Estonia	Clay	Lost 0–3
2005 Fed Cup	Europe/Africa Group I	19–24 April 2005; Antalya, Turkey	Sweden	Clay	Lost 1–2
2005 Fed Cup	Europe/Africa Group I	19–24 April 2005; Antalya, Turkey	Luxembourg	Clay	Lost 1–2
2005 Fed Cup	Europe/Africa Group I	19–24 April 2005; Antalya, Turkey	Netherlands	Clay	Lost 0–3
2004 Fed Cup	Europe/Africa Group I	19–24 April 2004; Athens, Greece	Bulgaria	Clay	Lost 1–2
2004 Fed Cup	Europe/Africa Group I	19–24 April 2004; Athens, Greece	Estonia	Clay	Lost 1–2
2004 Fed Cup	Europe/Africa Group I	19–24 April 2004; Athens, Greece	Greece	Clay	Win 2–1
2003 Fed Cup	Europe/Africa Group I	21–26 April 2003; Estoril, Portugal	Hungary	Clay	Lost 1–2
2003 Fed Cup	Europe/Africa Group I	21–26 April 2003; Estoril, Portugal	Ireland	Clay	Win 2–1
2003 Fed Cup	Europe/Africa Group I	21–26 April 2003; Estoril, Portugal	Great Britain	Clay	Lost 1–2
2003 Fed Cup	Europe/Africa Group I	21–26 April 2003; Estoril, Portugal	Netherlands	Clay	Win 2–1
2002 Fed Cup	Europe/Africa Group I	24–28 April 2002; Antalya, Turkey	Turkey	Clay	Win 2–1
2002 Fed Cup	Europe/Africa Group I	24–28 April 2002; Antalya, Turkey	Luxembourg	Clay	Lost 0–3
2002 Fed Cup	Europe/Africa Group I	24–28 April 2002; Antalya, Turkey	Yugoslavia	Clay	Lost 1–2
2001 Fed Cup	Europe/Africa Group I	24–28 April 2001; Murcia, Spain	Macedonia	Clay	Win 3–0
2001 Fed Cup	Europe/Africa Group I	24–28 April 2001; Murcia, Spain	Netherlands	Clay	Lost 0–3
2001 Fed Cup	Europe/Africa Group I	24–28 April 2001; Murcia, Spain	Yugoslavia	Clay	Lost 0–3
2000 Fed Cup	Europe/Africa Group I	15–21 May 2000; Murcia, Spain	Romania	Clay	Lost 0–3
2000 Fed Cup	Europe/Africa Group I	15–21 May 2000; Murcia, Spain	Morocco	Clay	Win 3–0
2000 Fed Cup	Europe/Africa Group I	15–21 May 2000; Murcia, Spain	Slovenia	Clay	Lost 0–3
2000 Fed Cup	Europe/Africa Group I	15–21 May 2000; Murcia, Spain	Belarus	Clay	Lost 0–3

=== 1990–1999 ===
Edition	Round	Date	Against	Surface	Team Result
1999 Fed Cup	Europe/Africa Group I	19–23 April 1999; Murcia, Spain	Luxembourg	Clay	Lost 1–2
1999 Fed Cup	Europe/Africa Group I	19–23 April 1999; Murcia, Spain	Georgia	Clay	Win 3–0
1999 Fed Cup	Europe/Africa Group I	19–23 April 1999; Murcia, Spain	Slovenia	Clay	Lost 1–2
1998 Fed Cup	World Group II Play-off	25–26 July 1998; Bergheim, Austria	Austria	Clay	Lost 0–5
1998 Fed Cup	Europe/Africa Group I	14–28 April 1998; Murcia, Spain	Romania	Clay	Win 2–0
1998 Fed Cup	Europe/Africa Group I	14–28 April 1998; Murcia, Spain	Greece	Clay	Win 2–1
1998 Fed Cup	Europe/Africa Group I	14–28 April 1998; Murcia, Spain	Portugal	Clay	Win 2–1
1998 Fed Cup	Europe/Africa Group I	14–28 April 1998; Murcia, Spain	Great Britain	Clay	Win 2–1
1998 Fed Cup	Europe/Africa Group I	14–28 April 1998; Murcia, Spain	Madagascar	Clay	Win 3–0
1997 Fed Cup	Europe/Africa Group I	22–26 April 1997; Bari, Italy	Finland	Clay	Win 3–0
1997 Fed Cup	Europe/Africa Group I	22–26 April 1997; Bari, Italy	Belarus	Clay	Lost 0–3
1997 Fed Cup	Europe/Africa Group I	22–26 April 1997; Bari, Italy	Hungary	Clay	Lost 0–3
1996 Fed Cup	Europe/Africa Group II	25–30 March 1996; Ramat HaSharon, Israel	Denmark	Hard	Win 2–1
1996 Fed Cup	Europe/Africa Group II	25–30 March 1996; Ramat HaSharon, Israel	Ethiopia	Hard	Win 3–0
1996 Fed Cup	Europe/Africa Group II	25–30 March 1996; Ramat HaSharon, Israel	Botswana	Hard	Win 3–0
1996 Fed Cup	Europe/Africa Group II	25–30 March 1996; Ramat HaSharon, Israel	Lithuania	Hard	Win 3–0
1995 Fed Cup	Europe/Africa Group I	17–21 April 1995; Murcia, Spain	Great Britain	Clay	Lost 1–2
1995 Fed Cup	Europe/Africa Group I	17–21 April 1995; Murcia, Spain	Slovenia	Clay	Lost 1–2
1995 Fed Cup	Europe/Africa Group I	17–21 April 1995; Murcia, Spain	Czech Republic	Clay	Lost 0–3
1994 Fed Cup	World Group 1st round	19 July 1994; Frankfurt, Germany	Austria	Clay	Lost 1–2
1993 Fed Cup	World Group 1st round	19 July 1993; Frankfurt, Germany	Indonesia	Clay	Lost 1–2
1993 Fed Cup	World Group play-off	22 July 1993; Frankfurt, Germany	Great Britain	Clay	Win 2–1
1992 Fed Cup	World Group quarterfinal	13–19 July 1992; Frankfurt, Germany	Germany	Clay	Lost 0–3
1992 Fed Cup	World Group 2nd round	13–19 July 1992; Frankfurt, Germany	Sweden	Clay	Win 2–1
1992 Fed Cup	World Group 1st round	13–19 July 1992; Frankfurt, Germany	Israel	Clay	Win 3–0
1991 Fed Cup	World Group 2nd round	18–28 July 1991; Nottingham, United Kingdom	Indonesia	Hard	Lost 1–2
1991 Fed Cup	World Group 1st round	18–28 July 1991; Nottingham, United Kingdom	France	Hard	Win 2–1
1991 Fed Cup	World Group qualifying round	18–28 July 1991; Nottingham, United Kingdom	Kenya	Hard	Win 3–0
1991 Fed Cup	World Group qualifying round	18–28 July 1991; Nottingham, United Kingdom	Uruguay	Hard	Win 3–0
1990 Fed Cup	World Group, Consolation Round	21–29 July 1990; Norcross, United States	Argentina	Hard	Lost 0–3
1990 Fed Cup	World Group, Consolation Round	21–29 July 1990; Norcross, United States	Dominican Republic	Hard	Win 2–1
1990 Fed Cup	World Group 1st round	21–29 July 1990; Norcross, United States	United States	Hard	Lost 0–3
1990 Fed Cup	World Group qualifying round	21–29 July 1990; Norcross, United States	Uruguay	Hard	Win 2–1

=== 1980–1989 ===
Edition	Round	Date	Against	Surface	Team Result
1989 Fed Cup	World Group, consolation round	1–9 October 1989; Tokyo, Japan	Brazil	Hard	Lost 1–2
1989 Fed Cup	World Group 1st round	1–9 October 1989; Tokyo, Japan	Denmark	Hard	Lost 0–3
1989 Fed Cup	World Group, qualifying round	1–9 October 1989; Tokyo, Japan	Singapore	Hard	Win 3–0
1988 Fed Cup	World Group, Consolation Round	4–11 December 1988; Melbourne, Australia	Israel	Hard	Lost 0–3
1988 Fed Cup	World Group 1st round	4–11 December 1988; Melbourne, Australia	Italy	Hard	Lost 1–2
1987 Fed Cup	World Group, consolation round	26 July–2 August 1987; Vancouver, Canada	Ireland	Hard	Lost 0–3
1987 Fed Cup	World Group 1st round	26 July–2 August 1987; Vancouver, Canada	Yugoslavia	Hard	Lost 1–2
1987 Fed Cup	World Group, qualifying round	26 July–2 August 1987; Vancouver, Canada	Philippines	Hard	Win 2–1
1986 Fed Cup	World Group, consolation round	20–27 July 1986; Prague, Czechoslovakia	Hungary	Clay	Lost 0–3
1986 Fed Cup	World Group 1st round	20–27 July 1986; Prague, Czechoslovakia	Yugoslavia	Clay	Lost 0–3
1986 Fed Cup	World Group, qualifying round	20–27 July 1986; Prague, Czechoslovakia	Mexico	Clay	Win 3–0
1985 Fed Cup	Not played				
1984 Fed Cup	Not played				
1983 Fed Cup	Not played				
1982 Fed Cup	Not played				
1981 Fed Cup	Not played				
1980 Fed Cup	World Group, consolation round	20–27 July 1986; West Berlin, West Germany	Canada	Clay	Lost 0–2
1980 Fed Cup	World Group, consolation round	20–27 July 1986; West Berlin, West Germany	Chinese Taipei	Clay	Win 3–0
1980 Fed Cup	World Group 1st round	20–27 July 1986; West Berlin, West Germany	United States	Clay	Lost 0–3

=== 1970–1979 ===
Edition	Round	Date	Against	Surface	Team Result
1979 Fed Cup	Not played				
1978 Fed Cup	Not played				
1977 Fed Cup	Not played				
1976 Fed Cup	Not played				
1975 Fed Cup	Not played				
1974 Fed Cup	World Group, consolation round	13–19 May 1974; Naples, Italy	Japan	Clay	Lost 1–2
1974 Fed Cup	World Group, consolation round	13–19 May 1974; Naples, Italy	Sweden	Clay	Win 2–1
1974 Fed Cup	World Group, consolation round	13–19 May 1974; Naples, Italy	Switzerland	Clay	Win 3–0
1974 Fed Cup	World Group 2nd round	13–19 May 1974; Naples, Italy	United States	Clay	Lost 0–3
1974 Fed Cup	World Group 1st round	13–19 May 1974; Naples, Italy	Luxembourg	Clay	Win 3–0
1973 Fed Cup	World Group 1st round	30 April–6 May 1973; Bad Homburg, West Germany	Luxembourg	Clay	Walkover
1972 Fed Cup	Not played				
1971 Fed Cup	Not played				
1970 Fed Cup	World Group 1st round	19–24 May 1970; Freiburg, West Germany	Italy	Clay	Walkover

=== 1960–1969 ===
Edition	Round	Date	Against	Surface	Team Result
1969 Fed Cup	World Group 2nd round	19–25 May 1969; Athens, Greece	Australia	Clay	Walkover
1968 Fed Cup	World Group 2nd round	21–26 May 1968; Paris, France	Netherlands	Clay	Lost 1–2
1968 Fed Cup	World Group 1st round	21–26 May 1968; Paris, France	Greece	Clay	Win 2–0
1967 Fed Cup	World Group 2nd round	6–11 June 1967; West Berlin, West Germany	France	Clay	Walkover
1966 Fed Cup	World Group 2nd round	10–16 May 1966; Turin, Italy	Czechoslovakia	Clay	Lost 0–3
1966 Fed Cup	World Group 1st round	10–16 May 1966; Turin, Italy	East Germany	Clay	Walkover

== Head-to-head record ==
Country	Record	W%	Hard	Clay	Carpet
Romania	5–2	71%	4–0	1–1	0–1
Sweden	5–2	71%	3–1	2–1	0–0
Greece	4–0	100%	0–0	4–0	0–0
Georgia	4–0	100%	1–0	2–0	1–0
Turkey	4–0	100%	3–0	1–0	0–0
Israel	4–1	80%	3–1	1–0	0–0
Great Britain	4–2	67%	1–0	3–2	0–0
Luxembourg	4–4	50%	2–0	2–4	0–0
Switzerland	3–1	75%	1–1	2–0	0–0
Croatia	2–0	100%	2–0	0–0	0–0
Portugal	2–0	100%	0–0	2–0	0–0
Uruguay	2–0	100%	2–0	0–0	0–0
Denmark	2–1	67%	2–1	0–0	0–0
Austria	2–2	50%	2–0	0–2	0–0
Bulgaria	2–2	50%	1–1	1–1	0–0
Spain	2–2	50%	1–1	1–0	0–1
Botswana	1–0	100%	1–0	0–0	0–0
Dominican Republic	1–0	100%	1–0	0–0	0–0
East Germany	1–0	100%	0–0	1–0	0–0
Ethiopia	1–0	100%	1–0	0–0	0–0
Finland	1–0	100%	0–0	1–0	0–0
Kenya	1–0	100%	1–0	0–0	0–0
Lithuania	1–0	100%	1–0	0–0	0–0
Madagascar	1–0	100%	0–0	1–0	0–0
Mexico	1–0	100%	0–0	1–0	0–0
Morocco	1–0	100%	0–0	1–0	0–0
North Macedonia	1–0	100%	0–0	1–0	0–0
Philippines	1–0	100%	1–0	0–0	0–0

Country	Record	W%	Hard	Clay	Carpet
Singapore	1–0	100%	1–0	0–0	0–0
Belgium	1–1	50%	1–0	0–0	0–1
Brazil	1–1	50%	1–1	0–0	0–0
Chinese Taipei	1–1	50%	0–1	1–0	0–0
France	1–1	50%	1–0	0–1	0–0
Ireland	1–1	50%	0–1	1–0	0–0
Japan	1–1	50%	0–0	1–1	0–0
Latvia	1–1	50%	0–1	1–0	0–0
Czech Republic / Czechoslovakia	1–3	25%	1–1	0–2	0–0
Netherlands	1–3	25%	0–0	1–3	0–0
Slovenia	1–3	25%	1–0	0–3	0–0
Argentina	0–1	0%	0–1	0–0	0–0
Australia	0–1	0%	0–0	0–1	0–0
Germany	0–1	0%	0–0	0–1	0–0
Kazakhstan	0–1	0%	0–0	0–1	0–0
Ukraine	0–2	0%	0–0	0–2	0–0
Canada	0–2	0%	0–1	0–1	0–0
Estonia	0–2	0%	0–0	0–2	0–0
Indonesia	0–2	0%	0–1	0–1	0–0
Russia	0–2	0%	0–2	0–0	0–0
Belarus	0–3	0%	0–1	0–2	0–0
Hungary	0–3	0%	0–0	0–3	0–0
Italy	0–3	0%	0–2	0–1	0–0
United States	0–5	0%	0–3	0–2	0–0
Serbia / Yugoslavia	0–6	0%	0–2	0–3	0–1
Overall win–loss	74–69	52%	40–24	33–41	1–4

*Statistics as of April 11, 2025

== See also ==
- Billie Jean King Cup
- Poland Davis Cup team
- Poland at the Hopman Cup
