= 2008 Fed Cup Europe/Africa Zone Group I – Pool D =

Group D of the 2008 Fed Cup Europe/Africa Zone Group I was one of four pools in the Europe/Africa Zone Group I of the 2008 Fed Cup. Four teams competed in a round robin competition, with the top team and the bottom team proceeding to their respective sections of the play-offs: the top team played for advancement to the World Group II Play-offs, while the bottom team faced potential relegation to Group II.

		(Serbia) SRB	(Poland) POL	(Romania) ROU	RR; W–L	Set; W–L	Game; W–L	Standings
19	Serbia		2–1	2–1	2–0	9–7	83–81	1
34	Poland	1–2		0–3	0–2	4–10	63–76	3
42	Romania	1–2	3–0		1–1	10–6	89–78	2

== Poland vs. Romania ==
Poland
0
SYMA Sportközpont, Budapest, Hungary
30 January 2008
Taraflex carpet (indoors)

Romania
3

			1	2	3
1	(Poland) (Romania)	Urszula Radwańska; Monica Niculescu	5; 7	6; 2	4; 6
2	(Poland) (Romania)	Agnieszka Radwańska; Sorana Cîrstea	4; 6	5; 7
3	(Poland) (Romania)	Klaudia Jans / Alicja Rosolska; Sorana Cîrstea / Monica Niculescu	4; 6	3; 6

== Serbia vs. Poland ==
Serbia
2
SYMA Sportközpont, Budapest, Hungary
31 January 2008
Taraflex carpet (indoors)

Poland
1

			1	2	3
1	(Serbia) (Poland)	Ana Ivanovic; Urszula Radwańska	6; 3	6; 1
2	(Serbia) (Poland)	Jelena Janković; Agnieszka Radwańska	6; 4	6^{2} 7^{7}	7; 5
3	(Serbia) (Poland)	Teodora Mirčić / Ana Jovanović; Klaudia Jans / Alicja Rosolska	3; 6	2; 6

== Serbia vs. Romania ==
Serbia
2
SYMA Sportközpont, Budapest, Hungary
1 February 2008
Taraflex carpet (indoors)

Romania
1

			1	2	3
1	(Serbia) (Romania)	Ana Ivanovic; Monica Niculescu	5; 7	6; 4	7; 5
2	(Serbia) (Romania)	Jelena Janković; Sorana Cîrstea	3; 6	6; 3	4; 6
3	(Serbia) (Romania)	Ana Ivanovic / Jelena Janković; Sorana Cîrstea / Monica Niculescu	2; 6	7^{7} 6^{3}	7^{7} 6^{2}

== See also ==
- Fed Cup structure
