= 2018 Fed Cup Europe/Africa Zone Group I – Pool D =

Subsection of tennis competition

Pool D of the 2018 Fed Cup Europe/Africa Zone Group I was one of four pools in the Europe/Africa zone of the 2018 Fed Cup. Four teams competed in a round robin competition, with the top team and the bottom team proceeding to their respective sections of the play-offs: the top team played for advancement to the World Group II Play-offs, while the bottom team faced potential relegation to Group II.

== Standings ==
		LAT	POL	TUR	AUT	RR; W–L	Set; W–L	Game; W–L	Standings
10	Latvia		2–1	2–1	3–0	3–0	15–6 (71%)	100–66 (60%)	1
4	Poland	1–2		2–1	2–1	2–1	11–8 (58%)	88–77 (53%)	2
6	Turkey	1–2	1–2		2–1	1–2	9–13 (41%)	96–112 (46%)	3
9	Austria	0–3	1–2	1–2		0–3	7–15 (32%)	89–118 (43%)	4

Standings are determined by: 1. number of wins; 2. number of matches; 3. in two-team ties, head-to-head records; 4. in three-team ties, (a) percentage of sets won (head-to-head records if two teams remain tied), then (b) percentage of games won (head-to-head records if two teams remain tied), then (c) Fed Cup rankings.

== Round-robin ==
=== Poland vs. Austria ===
Poland
2
Tallink Tennis Centre, Tallinn, Estonia
7 February
Hard (indoors)

Austria
1

			1	2	3
1	(Poland) (Austria)	Magdalena Fręch; Melanie Klaffner	3; 6	4; 6
2	(Poland) (Austria)	Magda Linette; Julia Grabher	6; 2	7; 5
3	(Poland) (Austria)	Magda Linette / Alicja Rosolska; Julia Grabher / Melanie Klaffner	6; 3	6; 4

=== Turkey vs. Latvia ===
Turkey
1
Tallink Tennis Centre, Tallinn, Estonia
7 February
Hard (indoors)

Latvia
2

			1	2	3
1	(Turkey) (Latvia)	Ayla Aksu; Anastasija Sevastova	4; 6	3; 6
2	(Turkey) (Latvia)	Çağla Büyükakçay; Jeļena Ostapenko	6; 2	3; 6	6; 3
3	(Turkey) (Latvia)	Ayla Aksu / Pemra Özgen; Jeļena Ostapenko / Anastasija Sevastova	1; 6	1; 6

=== Poland vs. Latvia ===
Poland
1
Tallink Tennis Centre, Tallinn, Estonia
8 February
Hard (indoors)

Latvia
2

			1	2	3
1	(Poland) (Latvia)	Magdalena Fręch; Anastasija Sevastova	1; 6	2; 6
2	(Poland) (Latvia)	Magda Linette; Jeļena Ostapenko	3; 6	3; 6
3	(Poland) (Latvia)	Magda Linette / Alicja Rosolska; Diāna Marcinkēviča / Daniela Vismane	6; 1	6; 0

=== Turkey vs. Austria ===
Turkey
2
Tallink Tennis Centre, Tallinn, Estonia
8 February
Hard (indoors)

Austria
1

			1	2	3
1	(Turkey) (Austria)	Başak Eraydın; Julia Grabher	7; 5	4; 6	5; 7
2	(Turkey) (Austria)	Çağla Büyükakçay; Barbara Haas	4; 6	7^{7} 6^{5}	6; 4
3	(Turkey) (Austria)	Ayla Aksu / Çağla Büyükakçay; Julia Grabher / Barbara Haas	6; 2	7^{7} 6^{5}

=== Poland vs. Turkey ===
Poland
2
Tallink Tennis Centre, Tallinn, Estonia
9 February
Hard (indoors)

Turkey
1

			1	2	3
1	(Poland) (Turkey)	Magdalena Fręch; Ayla Aksu	6; 2	6; 1
2	(Poland) (Turkey)	Magda Linette; Başak Eraydın	6; 4	7; 5
3	(Poland) (Turkey)	Alicja Rosolska / Iga Świątek; Ayla Aksu / Başak Eraydın	3; 6	6; 2	1; 6

=== Austria vs. Latvia ===
Austria
0
Tallink Tennis Centre, Tallinn, Estonia
9 February
Hard (indoors)

Latvia
3

			1	2	3
1	(Austria) (Latvia)	Pia König; Anastasija Sevastova	0; 6	1; 6
2	(Austria) (Latvia)	Melanie Klaffner; Jeļena Ostapenko	6; 2	0; 6	3; 6
3	(Austria) (Latvia)	Melanie Klaffner / Pia König; Diāna Marcinkēviča / Daniela Vismane	6; 2	2; 6	3; 6
