= Alina Tecșor =

Romanian tennis player

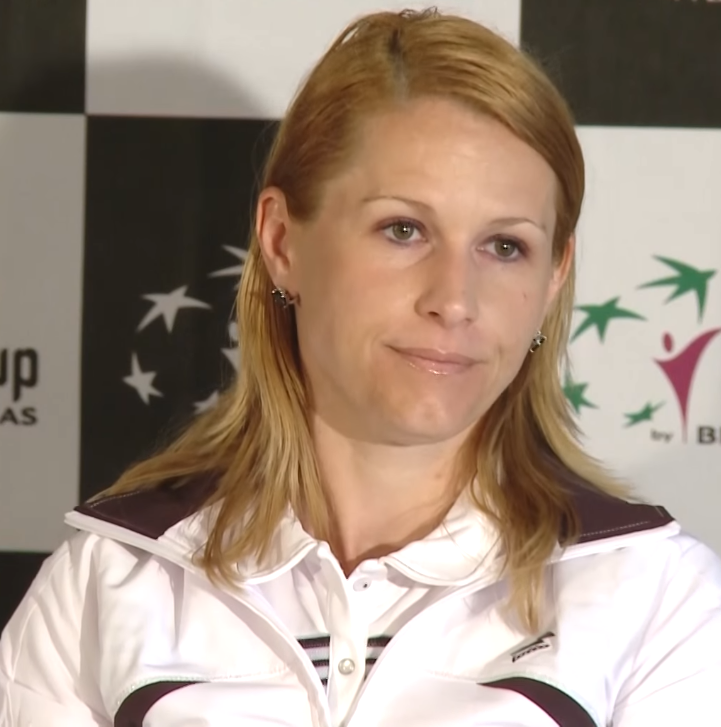
- Full name: Alina Cercel-Tecșor
- Country (sports): Romania
- Born: 29 October 1979 (age 46) Alexandria, Socialist Republic of Romania
- Turned pro: 1996
- Retired: 2001
- Plays: Right-handed
- Prize money: US$14,958

Singles
- Career record: 72–46
- Career titles: 0 WTA, 1 ITF
- Highest ranking: No. 364 (9 September 1996)

Doubles
- Career record: 12–20
- Career titles: 0 WTA, 0 ITF
- Highest ranking: No. 529 (7 October 1996)

Alina Tecșor (born 29 October 1979) is a professional Romanian retired tennis player and former captain of the Romania Fed Cup team. On 9 September 1996, she reached her highest WTA singles ranking of 364 whilst her best doubles ranking was 529 on 7 October 1996.

== ITF Circuit finals ==
=== Singles: 3 (1–2) ===
$100,000 tournaments
$75,000 tournaments
$50,000 tournaments
$25,000 tournaments
$10,000 tournaments

Result	No.	Date	Tournament	Surface	Opponent	Score
Loss	1.	19 May 1996	Toruń, Poland	Clay	(Poland) Ewa Radzikowska	3–6, 3–6
Loss	2.	15 September 1996	Albena, Thailand	Clay	(Federal Republic of Yugoslavia) Sandra Načuk	5–7, 6–7
Win	3.	17 November 1996	Cairo, Egypt	Clay	(South Africa) Jessica Steck	6–7, 5–0, RET
