= 2006 Fed Cup Europe/Africa Zone Group II – play-offs =

International tennis competition play-offs

The play-offs of the 2006 Fed Cup Europe/Africa Zone Group II were the final stages of the Group II Zonal Competition involving teams from Europe and Africa. Using the positions determined in their pools, the seven teams faced off to determine their placing in the 2006 Fed Cup Europe/Africa Zone Group II. The top two teams advanced to Group I, and the bottom two teams were relegated down to the Group III for the next year.

Placing	Pool A	Pool B
1	Lithuania	Poland
2	Georgia	Portugal
3	Ireland	Greece
4		Latvia

== Promotion play-offs ==
The top two teams of each pool were placed against each other in two head-to-head rounds. The winner of the rounds advanced to Group I for next year.

=== Lithuania vs. Portugal ===
Lithuania
2
Club Ali Bey, Manavgat, Antalya, Turkey
29 April 2006
Red clay (outdoors)

Portugal
0

			1	2	3
1	(Lithuania) (Portugal)	Aurelija Misevičiūtė; Ana Catarina Nogueira	3; 6	6; 0	6; 0
2	(Lithuania) (Portugal)	Lina Stančiūtė; Magali de Lattre	6; 2	6; 1
3	(Lithuania) (Portugal)					not played

=== Georgia vs. Poland ===
Georgia
0
Club Ali Bey, Manavgat, Antalya, Turkey
29 April 2006
Red clay (outdoors)

Poland
3

			1	2	3
1	(Georgia (country)) (Poland)	Ia Jikia; Urszula Radwańska	2; 6	6; 2	1; 6
2	(Georgia (country)) (Poland)	Margalita Chakhnashvili; Agnieszka Radwańska	3; 6	1; 6
3	(Georgia (country)) (Poland)	Margalita Chakhnashvili / Ia Jikia; Klaudia Jans / Alicja Rosolska	7; 5	1; 6	4; 6

== Relegation play-offs ==
Because there was one extra player in Pool B, the last-placed team of that pool (Latvia) was automatically relegated down to Group III. The third-placed teams of each pool were then placed against each other in a tie, where the losing team would join the Latvians in relegation.

=== Ireland vs. Greece ===
Ireland
1
Club Ali Bey, Manavgat, Antalya, Turkey
29 April 2006
Red clay (outdoors)

Greece
2

			1	2	3
1	(Republic of Ireland) (Greece)	Yvonne Doyle; Anna Gerasimou	3; 6	2; 6
2	(Republic of Ireland) (Greece)	Rachael Dillon; Anna Koumantou	6; 3	6; 4
3	(Republic of Ireland) (Greece)	Rachael Dillon / Yvonne Doyle; Anna Gerasimou / Anna Koumantou	5; 7	3; 6

== Final Placements ==
Placing	Teams
Promoted	Lithuania
Promoted	Poland
Third	Portugal
Third	Georgia
Fifth	Greece
Relegated	Ireland
Relegated	Latvia

- Lithuania and Poland advanced to the Europe/Africa Zone Group I for the next year. The Poles placed third overall, while the Lithuanians placed last in their pool of four and lost their play-offs, and thus faced relegation back to Group II for 2007.
- Ireland and Latvia were relegated down to Europe/Africa Zone Group III for the next year. The Irish and Latvians respectively placed first and second in the same pool of five, meaning that Latvia would remain in Group III for 2008, while Ireland would advance back to Group II.

== See also ==
- Fed Cup structure
