= Katarzyna Strączy =

Polish tennis player (born 1979)

- Full name: Katarzyna Strączy
- Country (sports): Poland
- Born: 28 November 1979 (age 46) Kraków, Poland
- Prize money: $47,801

Singles
- Career record: 135–122
- Career titles: 1 ITF
- Highest ranking: 215 (1 March 1999)

Grand Slam singles results
- Australian Open Junior: 3R (1997)
- French Open Junior: Q1 (1995)
- Wimbledon Junior: 2R (1996)
- US Open Junior: 2R (1995)

Doubles
- Career record: 21–42
- Career titles: 0
- Highest ranking: 325 (21 August 2000)

Grand Slam doubles results
- Australian Open Junior: SF (1997)
- French Open Junior: —
- Wimbledon Junior: —
- US Open Junior: 2R (1995)

Team competitions
- Fed Cup: 4–10

Katarzyna Strączy (born 28 November 1979) is a former Polish tennis player. In her career, she won one ITF singles title and reached a ranking high of world number 215 on 1 March 1999.

Strączy played 14 rubbers for the Poland Fed Cup team.

== ITF singles finals (1–2) ==
Legend $100,000 tournaments $75,000 tournaments $50,000 tournaments $25,000 tournaments $10,000 tournaments	Finals by surface Hard (0–0) Clay (1–2) Grass (0–0) Carpet (0–0)

Result	No.	Date	Tournament	Surface	Opponent	Score
Loss	1.	7 September 1998	Zadar, Croatia	Clay	(Czech Republic) Libuše Průšová	5–7, 0–6
Win	1.	14 August 2001	Valašské Meziříčí, Czech Republic	Clay	(Czech Republic) Milena Nekvapilová	7–6^{(7–3)}, 4–6, 6–2
Loss	2.	21 August 2001	Maribor, Slovenia	Clay	(Slovakia) Ľubomíra Kurhajcová	6–3, 5–7, 1–6
