= Ewa Radzikowska =

Polish tennis player

- Country (sports): Poland
- Born: 23 November 1979 (age 46)

Singles
- Highest ranking: No. 361 (10 June 1996)

Doubles
- Highest ranking: No. 791 (14 April 1997)

Ewa Radzikowska (born 23 November 1979) is a former professional tennis player and current pickleball player from Poland.

As of July 2025, Radzikowska is ranked No. 36 in the pickleball world rankings for women's doubles. At 45 years of age, she is the oldest player in the top 100.

== Biography ==
Radzikowska featured mostly in local ITF tournaments, with her only title coming at Toruń in 1996, beating Alina Tecșor in the final. She reached a best singles ranking of 361 in the world.

Most notably she featured in three Fed Cup ties in 1996 for Poland, which were competing in the Europe/Africa Zone. Partnering with Magdalena Mróz, she won her first two doubles matches for Poland without dropping a game, against African opponents. Her only singles match came in a tie against Denmark, which she lost to Sandra Olsen in three sets.

Following her career in professional tennis she played at college level at Oklahoma State University and continues to live in the United States.

== ITF finals ==
=== Singles: (1-2) ===
Result	No.	Date	Tournament	Surface	Opponent	Score
Loss	1.	29 May 1995	Katowice, Poland	Clay	(United States) Corina Morariu	4–6, 2–6
Win	1.	19 May 1996	Toruń, Poland	Clay	(Romania) Alina Tecșor	6–3, 6–3
Loss	2.	26 May 1996	Olsztyn, Poland	Clay	(Sweden) Annica Lindstedt	3–6, 3–6

== See also ==
- List of Poland Fed Cup team representatives
