= Ethiopia Billie Jean King Cup team =

Ethiopian women's tennis team

The Ethiopia Billie Jean King Cup team represented Ethiopia in the Fed Cup tennis competitions of 1996, 1997 and 1998, governed by the Ethiopian Tennis Federation. It lost all 13 of its ties.

== See also ==
- Billie Jean King Cup
- Ethiopia Davis Cup team
