= Joanna Sakowicz-Kostecka =

Polish tennis player (born 1984)

- Country (sports): Poland
- Born: 1 May 1984 (age 41); Kraków, Poland
- Height: 1.72 m (5 ft 8 in)
- Turned pro: 2000
- Retired: 2011
- Plays: Right-handed (two-handed backhand)
- Prize money: $116,884

Singles
- Career record: 168–155
- Career titles: 3 ITF
- Highest ranking: No. 138 (9 October 2006)

Grand Slam singles results
- Australian Open: Q1 (2007)
- French Open: Q3 (2006)
- Wimbledon: Q1 (2006, 2007)
- US Open: Q1 (2006, 2007)

Doubles
- Career record: 27–37
- Career titles: 1 ITF
- Highest ranking: No. 312 (23 June 2003)

Joanna Sakowicz-Kostecka (born 1 May 1984) is a former tennis player from Poland.

As a professional, her career-high singles ranking is world No. 138, achieved on 9 October 2006. Her highest doubles ranking is world No. 312, achieved on 23 June 2003.

In her career, she won three singles titles and one doubles title on the ITF Women's Circuit.

== ITF finals ==
$25,000 tournaments
$10,000 tournaments

=== Singles (3–4) ===
Result	No.	Date	Tournament	Surface	Opponent	Score
Win	1.	3 June 2001	Warsaw, Poland	Clay	(Romania) Raluca Ciochină	1–6, 6–2, 6–1
Loss	1.	18 November 2001	Stupava, Slovakia	Hard (i)	(Czech Republic) Petra Cetkovská	1–6, 4–6
Win	2.	30 June 2002	Rabat, Morocco	Clay	(Russia) Olga Kalyuzhnaya	6–3, 7–5
Loss	2.	10 July 2005	Bella Cup, Poland	Clay	(Serbia) Ana Timotić	1–6, 2–6
Loss	3.	27 November 2005	Opole, Poland	Carpet	(Ukraine) Oxana Lyubtsova	1–6, 6–3, 1–6
Win	3.	10 December 2005	Zubr Cup, Czech Republic	Carpet (i)	(Czech Republic) Lucie Hradecká	6–4, 6–4
Loss	4.	11 July 2006	Bella Cup, Poland	Clay	(Slovenia) Andreja Klepač	0–6, 2–6

=== Doubles (1–1) ===
Result	No.	Date	Tournament	Surface	Partner	Opponents	Score
Win	1.	23 June 2002	Tallinn, Estonia	Clay	(Czech Republic) Petra Cetkovská	(Austria) Petra Rüssegger (Germany) Stefanie Weis	6–2, 4–6, 6–4
Loss	1.	5 July 2005	Bella Cup Toruń, Poland	Clay	(Czech Republic) Zuzana Hejdová	(Belarus) Nadejda Ostrovskaya (Israel) Yevgenia Savransky	1–6, 5–7
