= Luxembourg Billie Jean King Cup team =

Luxembourgisch women's tennis team

Luxembourg
- Captain: Anne Kremer
- Nations Ranking: 96 ▼2 (13 April 2026)
- Colors: red & white
- First year: 1972
- Years played: 49
- Ties played (W–L): 176 (75–101)
- Years in World Group: 10 (1–10)
- Best finish: World Group 2R (1973, 1979)
- Most total wins: Anne Kremer (61–57)
- Most singles wins: Anne Kremer (45–29)
- Most doubles wins: Claudine Schaul (17–34)
- Best doubles team: Anne Kremer / Alexandra Scholer (4–1); Anne Kremer / Claudine Schaul (4–11); Mandy Minella / Claudine Schaul (4–12)
- Most ties played: Claudine Schaul (76)
- Most years played: Claudine Schaul (23)

The Luxembourg Billie Jean King Cup team represents Luxembourg in the Billie Jean King Cup tennis competition and are governed by the Fédération Luxembourgeoise de Tennis. They currently compete in the Europe/Africa Zone of Group II.

== History ==
Luxembourg competed in its first Fed Cup in 1972. Their best result was reaching the round of 16 in 1973 and 1979.

== Current team (2022) ==
- Mandy Minella
- Eléonora Molinaro
- Claudine Schaul
- Erna Brdarevic
- Marie Weckerle

== See also ==
- Billie Jean King Cup
- Luxembourg Davis Cup team
