= 2002 Fed Cup Europe/Africa Zone =

Subsection of tennis competition

The Europe/Africa Zone was one of three zones of regional competition in the 2002 Fed Cup.

== Group I ==
- Venue: Antalya, Turkey (outdoor clay)
- Date: 24–28 April

The sixteen teams were divided into four pools of four teams. The top teams of each pool played-off against the second-placed teams to decide which four nations progress to World Group play-offs. The four nations coming last in the pools were relegated to Group II for 2003.

=== Pools ===
| | Pool A | SLO | UKR | BLR | GRE |
| 1 | Slovenia (3–0) | | 3–0 | 2–1 | 2–1 |
| 2 | Ukraine (1–2) | 0–3 | | 1–2 | 3–0 |
| 3 | Belarus (1–2) | 1–2 | 2–1 | | 1–2 |
| 4 | Greece (1–2) | 1–2 | 0–3 | 2–1 | |

| | Pool B | ISR | NED | ROU | BIH |
| 1 | Israel (3–0) | | 2–1 | 2–1 | 3–0 |
| 2 | Netherlands (2–1) | 1–2 | | 2–1 | 3–0 |
| 3 | Romania (1–2) | 1–2 | 1–2 | | 3–0 |
| 4 | Bosnia and Herzegovina (0–3) | 0–3 | 0–3 | 0–3 | |

| | Pool C | BUL | EST | GEO | POR |
| 1 | Bulgaria (3–0) | | 2–1 | 2–1 | 3–0 |
| 2 | Estonia (1–2) | 1–2 | | 2–1 | 3–0 |
| 3 | Georgia (1–2) | 1–2 | 1–2 | | 2–1 |
| 4 | Portugal (1–2) | 0–3 | 0–3 | 1–2 | |

| | Pool D | LUX | YUG | POL | TUR |
| 1 | Luxembourg (3–0) | | 2–1 | 3–0 | 2–1 |
| 2 | Yugoslavia (2–1) | 1–2 | | 2–1 | 3–0 |
| 3 | Poland (1–2) | 0–3 | 1–2 | | 2–1 |
| 4 | Turkey (0–3) | 1–2 | 0–3 | 1–2 | |

=== Play-offs ===
| Winning team | Score | Losing team |
|---|---|---|
| Slovenia | 2–0 | Yugoslavia |
| Israel | 2–0 | Estonia |
| Ukraine | 2–1 | Bulgaria |
| Netherlands | 2–1 | Luxembourg |

- Slovenia, Israel, Ukraine and Netherlands advanced to 2002 World Group play-offs.
- Greece, Bosnia and Herzegovina, Portugal and Turkey relegated to Group II for 2003.

== Group II ==
- Venue: Pretoria, South Africa (outdoor hard)
- Date: 9–13 April

The eighteen teams were divided into two pools each of three teams and four teams. The placing of the teams within the pools determine who they are drawn against in the play-offs.

=== Pools ===
| | Pool A | GBR | NOR | MLT |
| 1 | Great Britain (2–0) | | 3–0 | 3–0 |
| 2 | Norway (1–1) | 0–3 | | 2–1 |
| 3 | Malta (0–2) | 0–3 | 1–2 | |

| | Pool B | DEN | LIT | TUN |
| 1 | Denmark (2–0) | | 3–0 | 3–0 |
| 2 | Lithuania (1–1) | 0–3 | | 3–0 |
| 3 | Tunisia (0–2) | 0–3 | 0–3 | |

| | Pool C | RSA | LAT | ALG | LIE |
| 1 | South Africa (3–0) | | 2–1 | 3–0 | 3–0 |
| 2 | Latvia (2–1) | 1–2 | | 2–1 | 3–0 |
| 3 | Algeria (1–2) | 0–3 | 1–2 | | 3–0 |
| 4 | Liechtenstein (0–3) | 0–3 | 0–3 | 0–3 | |

| | Pool D | IRL | FIN | EGY | BOT |
| 1 | Ireland (3–0) | | 3–0 | 3–0 | 3–0 |
| 2 | Finland (2–1) | 0–3 | | 3–0 | 3–0 |
| 3 | Egypt (1–2) | 0–3 | 0–3 | | 3–0 |
| 4 | Botswana (0–3) | 0–3 | 0–3 | 0–3 | |

=== Play-offs ===
First Round; 12 April
2 | Lithuania | 2
3 | Egypt | 0

Final; 13 April
1 | Great Britain | 2
Lithuania | 0

First Round; 12 April
South Africa | 3
Malta | 0
Tunisia | 0
Finland | 3

Final; 13 April
South Africa | 2
Finland | 0

First Round; 12 April
2 | Latvia | 3
3 | Botswana | 0

Final; 13 April
1 | Denmark | 3
Latvia | 0

First Round; 12 April
Ireland | 3
Liechtenstein | 0
Algeria | 2
Norway | 1

Final; 13 April
Ireland | 2
Algeria | 0

- Great Britain, Denmark, South Africa and Ireland advanced to Group I for 2003.

== See also ==
- Fed Cup structure
