= 2002 Fed Cup Europe/Africa Zone Group II – play-offs =

International tennis competition play-offs

The Knockout Stage of the 2002 Fed Cup Europe/Africa Zone Group I was the final stage of the Zonal Competition involving teams from Europe and Africa. Using the positions determined in their pools, the fourteen teams were divided into four different knock-out sections, with the four winners advancing to Group I next year.

Placing	Pool A	Pool B	Pool C	Pool D
1	Great Britain	Denmark	South Africa	Ireland
2	Norway	Lithuania	Latvia	Finland
3	Malta	Tunisia	Algeria	Egypt
4			Liechtenstein	Botswana

== Draw ==
First Round; 12 April
2	Lithuania	2
3	Egypt	0

Final; 13 April
1	Great Britain	2
Lithuania	0

First Round; 12 April
South Africa	3
Malta	0
Tunisia	0
Finland	3

Final; 13 April
South Africa	2
Finland	0

First Round; 12 April
2	Latvia	3
3	Botswana	0

Final; 13 April
1	Denmark	3
Latvia	0

First Round; 12 April
Ireland	3
Liechtenstein	0
Algeria	2
Norway	1

Final; 13 April
Ireland	2
Algeria	0

=== First round ===
==== Lithuania vs. Egypt ====
Lithuania
2
Pretoria, South Africa
12 April 2002
Hard (outdoors)

Egypt
0

			1	2	3
1	(Lithuania) (Egypt)	Lina Stančiūtė; Dina Khalil	6; 3	6; 4
2	(Lithuania) (Egypt)	Edita Liachovičiūtė; Yomna Farid	7; 5	1; 6	6; 3
3	(Lithuania) (Egypt)					not played

==== Latvia vs. Botswana ====
Latvia
3
Pretoria, South Africa
12 April 2002
Hard (outdoors)

Botswana
0

			1	2	3
1	(Latvia) (Botswana)	Anete Banderę; Razalia Phethu	6; 1	6; 2
2	(Latvia) (Botswana)	Katrina Banderę; Tapiwa Marobela	6; 2	6; 2
3	(Latvia) (Botswana)	Anete Banderę / Ilona Giberte; Tapiwa Marobela / Razalia Phethu	6; 0	6; 2

==== South Africa vs. Malta ====
South Africa
3
Pretoria, South Africa
12 April 2002
Hard (outdoors)

Malta
0

			1	2	3
1	(South Africa) (Malta)	Chanelle Scheepers; Sarah Wetz	6; 0	6; 2
2	(South Africa) (Malta)	Natalie Grandin; Rosanne Dimech	6; 1	6; 1
3	(South Africa) (Malta)	Esmé de Villiers / Nicole Rencken; Rosanne Dimech / Sarah Wetz	6; 2	6; 1

==== Tunisia vs. Finland ====
Tunisia
0
Pretoria, South Africa
12 April 2002
Hard (outdoors)

Finland
3

			1	2	3
1	(Tunisia) (Finland)	Imen Ben Larbi; Maarit Nieminen	0; 6	4; 6
2	(Tunisia) (Finland)	Nadia Kilani; Emma Laine	0; 6	1; 6
3	(Tunisia) (Finland)	Imen Ben Larbi / Mariem Nissef Bouchlaka; Emma Laine / Piia Suomalainen	2; 6	1; 6

==== Ireland vs. Liechtenstein ====
Ireland
3
Pretoria, South Africa
12 April 2002
Hard (outdoors)

Liechtenstein
0

			1	2	3
1	(Republic of Ireland) (Liechtenstein)	Yvonne Doyle; Jeannine Niedhardt	6; 2	6; 0
2	(Republic of Ireland) (Liechtenstein)	Kelly Liggan; Sabrina Vogt	6; 1	6; 1
3	(Republic of Ireland) (Liechtenstein)	Claire Curran / Elsa O'Riain; Nadine Batliner / Angelika Schädler	6; 1	6; 1

==== Algeria vs. Norway ====
Algeria
2
Pretoria, South Africa
12 April 2002
Hard (outdoors)

Norway
1

			1	2	3
1	(Algeria) (Norway)	Sana Ben Salah; Annette Aksdal	6; 0	6; 1
2	(Algeria) (Norway)	Feriel Esseghir; Ina Sartz	6; 2	6; 4
3	(Algeria) (Norway)	Sihem Ben Youcef / Saida Hared; Annette Aksdal / Ina Sartz	2; 6	4; 6

=== Finals ===
==== Great Britain vs. Lithuania ====
Great Britain
2
Pretoria, South Africa
13 April 2002
Hard (outdoors)

Lithuania
0

			1	2	3
1	(United Kingdom) (Lithuania)	Elena Baltacha; Lina Stančiūtė	4; 6	6; 2	6; 2
2	(United Kingdom) (Lithuania)	Lucie Ahl; Edita Liachovičiūtė	6; 3	6; 1
3	(United Kingdom) (Lithuania)					not played

- Great Britain advanced to Group I for 2003, where they placed fourth in their pool of five.

==== Denmark vs. Latvia ====
Denmark
3
Pretoria, South Africa
13 April 2002
Hard (outdoors)

Latvia
0

			1	2	3
1	(Denmark) (Latvia)	Karina-Ildor Jacobsgaard; Anete Banderę	6^{3} 7^{7}	6; 2	6; 0
2	(Denmark) (Latvia)	Eva Dyrberg; Katrina Banderę	6; 3	6; 3
3	(Denmark) (Latvia)	Andrea Munch-Hermansen / Karina-Ildor Jacobsgaard; Anete Banderę / Ilona Giberte	6; 3	6; 2

- Denmark advanced to Group I for 2003, where they placed third in their pool of four.

==== South Africa vs. Finland ====
South Africa
2
Pretoria, South Africa
13 April 2002
Hard (outdoors)

Finland
0

			1	2	3
1	(South Africa) (Finland)	Nicole Rencken; Maarit Nieminen	3; 6	6; 0	6; 2
2	(South Africa) (Finland)	Natalie Grandin; Emma Laine	6; 2	6; 4
3	(South Africa) (Finland)					not played

==== Ireland vs. Algeria ====
Ireland
2
Pretoria, South Africa
13 April 2002
Hard (outdoors)

Algeria
0

			1	2	3
1	(Republic of Ireland) (Algeria)	Yvonne Doyle; Sana Ben Salah	6; 3	6; 1
2	(Republic of Ireland) (Algeria)	Kelly Liggan; Feriel Esseghir	7^{7} 6^{3}	6; 1
3	(Republic of Ireland) (Algeria)					not played

- Ireland advanced to Group I for 2003, where they placed last in their pool of five and thus was relegated back to Group II for 2004.

== See also ==
- Fed Cup structure
