= Angelika Schädler =

Liechtenstein tennis player (born 1980)

- Full name: Angelika Schädler
- Country (sports): Liechtenstein
- Born: 29 April 1980 (age 44)

Team competitions
- Fed Cup: 7–15

Angelika Schädler (born 29 April 1980) is a retired tennis player from Liechtenstein.

Representing Liechtenstein, Schädler has an overall record of 7–15 in Fed Cup competition.

== Fed Cup participation ==
=== Singles ===
Edition	Stage	Date	Location	Against	Surface	Opponent	W/L	Score
1996 Fed Cup; Europe/Africa Zone Group II	R/R	25 March 1996	Ramat HaSharon, Israel	Tunisia	Hard	(Tunisia) Selima Sfar	L	2–6, 1–6
1996 Fed Cup; Europe/Africa Zone Group II	R/R	26 March 1996	Ramat HaSharon, Israel	Cyprus	Hard	(Cyprus) Andria Hadjioannou	W	6–1, 6–1
1996 Fed Cup; Europe/Africa Zone Group II	R/R	27 March 1996	Ramat HaSharon, Israel	Turkey	Hard	(Turkey) Gülberk Gültekin	L	1–6, 1–6
1996 Fed Cup; Europe/Africa Zone Group II	R/R	28 March 1996	Ramat HaSharon, Israel	Finland	Hard	(Finland) Nanne Dahlman	L	2–6, 0–6
1998 Fed Cup; Europe/Africa Zone Group II	R/R	5 May 1998	Manavgat, Turkey	Egypt	Clay	(Egypt) Marwa El Wany	L	5–7, 5–7
1998 Fed Cup; Europe/Africa Zone Group II	R/R	6 May 1998	Manavgat, Turkey	(North Macedonia) Macedonia	Clay	(North Macedonia) Marina Lazarovska	L	0–6, 1–6
1998 Fed Cup; Europe/Africa Zone Group II	R/R	8 May 1998	Manavgat, Turkey	Botswana	Clay	(Botswana) Mmaphala Letsatle	W	6–3, 6–3
2000 Fed Cup; Europe/Africa Zone Group II	R/R	28 March 2000	Estoril, Portugal	Denmark	Clay	(Denmark) Charlotte Aagaard	L	0–6, 2–6
2000 Fed Cup; Europe/Africa Zone Group II	R/R	29 March 2000	Estoril, Portugal	Iceland	Clay	(Iceland) Sigurlaug Sigurðardóttir	W	6–0, 6–0
2000 Fed Cup; Europe/Africa Zone Group II	R/R	30 March 2000	Estoril, Portugal	Tunisia	Clay	(Tunisia) Mariem Nissaf Bouchlaka	W	6–4, 6–3
2000 Fed Cup; Europe/Africa Zone Group II	R/R	31 March 2000	Estoril, Portugal	Botswana	Clay	(Botswana) Kelesitse Makgale	W	6–1, 6–0
2000 Fed Cup; Europe/Africa Zone Group II	R/R	1 April 2000	Estoril, Portugal	Bosnia and Herzegovina	Clay	(Bosnia and Herzegovina) Asja Tankić	L	1–6, 2–6

=== Doubles ===
Edition	Stage	Date	Location	Against	Surface	Partner	Opponents	W/L	Score
1996 Fed Cup; Europe/Africa Zone Group II	R/R	26 March 1996	Ramat HaSharon, Israel	Cyprus	Hard	(Liechtenstein) Andrea Hoch	(Cyprus) Anna Anastasiou (Cyprus) Eleni Pilava Papanikolaou	W	6–2, 6–3
1996 Fed Cup; Europe/Africa Zone Group II	R/R	27 March 1996	Ramat HaSharon, Israel	Turkey	Hard	(Liechtenstein) Andrea Hoch	(Turkey) Gülberk Gültekin (Turkey) İpek Şenoğlu	L	1–6, 2–6
1996 Fed Cup; Europe/Africa Zone Group II	R/R	28 March 1996	Ramat HaSharon, Israel	Finland	Hard	(Liechtenstein) Nicola Corn	(Finland) Hanna-Katri Aalto (Finland) Nanne Dahlman	L	3–6, 2–6
1998 Fed Cup; Europe/Africa Zone Group II	R/R	5 May 1998	Manavgat, Turkey	Egypt	Clay	(Liechtenstein) Sidonia Wolfinger	(Egypt) Dalia El Sheikh (Egypt) Marwa El Wany	W	4–6, 7–5, 6–1
1998 Fed Cup; Europe/Africa Zone Group II	R/R	7 May 1998	Manavgat, Turkey	Finland	Clay	(Liechtenstein) Sidonia Wolfinger	(Finland) Nanne Dahlman (Finland) Linda Jansson	L	2–6, 1–6
2000 Fed Cup; Europe/Africa Zone Group II	R/R	30 March 2000	Estoril, Portugal	Tunisia	Clay	(Liechtenstein) Sidonia Wolfinger	(Tunisia) Nadia Kilani (Tunisia) Selima Sfar	L	0–6, 4–6
2002 Fed Cup; Europe/Africa Zone Group II	R/R	9 April 2002	Pretoria, South Africa	South Africa	Hard	(Liechtenstein) Nadine Batliner	(South Africa) Esmé de Villiers (South Africa) Chanelle Scheepers	L	0–6, 2–6
2002 Fed Cup; Europe/Africa Zone Group II	R/R	10 April 2002	Pretoria, South Africa	Algeria	Hard	(Liechtenstein) Nadine Batliner	(Algeria) Feriel Esseghir (Algeria) Saida Hared	L	4–6, 3–6
2002 Fed Cup; Europe/Africa Zone Group II	R/R	11 April 2002	Pretoria, South Africa	Latvia	Hard	(Liechtenstein) Nadine Batliner	(Latvia) Anete Bandere (Latvia) Ilona Giberte	L	3–6, 3–6
2002 Fed Cup; Europe/Africa Zone Group II	P/O	12 April 2002	Pretoria, South Africa	(Republic of Ireland) Ireland	Hard	(Liechtenstein) Nadine Batliner	(Republic of Ireland) Claire Curran (Republic of Ireland) Elsa O'Riain	L	1–6, 1–6
