= 2000 Fed Cup Europe/Africa Zone Group II – Pool B =

International tennis competition

Group B of the 2000 Fed Cup Europe/Africa Zone Group II was one of four pools in the Europe/Africa zone of the 2000 Fed Cup. Five teams competed in a round robin competition, with the top team advancing to Group I for 2001.

	(Denmark) DEN	(Bosnia and Herzegovina) BIH	(Tunisia) TUN	(Liechtenstein) LIE	(Botswana) BOT	(Iceland) ISL	Match; W–L	Set; W–L	Game; W–L	Standings
Denmark		3–0	1–0	3–0	3–0	3–0	5–0	26–0	156–35	1
Bosnia and Herzegovina	0–3		3–0	1–0	3–0	3–0	4–1	18–7	120–71	2
Tunisia	0–1	0–3		2–1	3–0	3–0	3–2	17–10	121–92	3
Liechtenstein	0–3	0–1	1–2		3–0	3–0	2–3	14–12	103–102	4
Botswana	0–3	0–3	0–3	0–3		1–0	1–4	2–24	48–154	5
Iceland	0–3	0–3	0–3	0–3	0–1		0–5	0–23	37–142	6

== Denmark vs. Liechtenstein ==
Denmark
3
Estoril T.C., Estoril, Portugal
28 March 2000
Red clay (outdoors)

Liechtenstein
0

			1	2	3
1	(Denmark) (Liechtenstein)	Charlotte Aagaard; Angelika Schädler	6; 0	6; 2
2	(Denmark) (Liechtenstein)	Eva Dyrberg; Sabrina Vogt	6; 0	6; 0
3	(Denmark) (Liechtenstein)	Rikke Faurfelt / Karina-Ildor Jacobsgaard; Bettina Niedhart / Sidonia Wolfinger	6; 1	6; 2

== Bosnia and Herzegovina vs. Iceland ==
Bosnia and Herzegovina
3
Estoril T.C., Estoril, Portugal
28 March 2000
Red clay (outdoors)

Iceland
0

			1	2	3
1	(Bosnia and Herzegovina) (Iceland)	Asja Tankić; Stella Kristjánsdóttir	6; 4	3; 0		retired
2	(Bosnia and Herzegovina) (Iceland)	Azra Rešić; Iris Staub	6; 4	6; 1
3	(Bosnia and Herzegovina) (Iceland)	Medina Bajrambašić / Azra Rešić; Stella Kristjánsdóttir / Iris Staub				w/o

== Tunisia vs. Botswana ==
Tunisia
3
Estoril T.C., Estoril, Portugal
28 March 2000
Red clay (outdoors)

Botswana
0

			1	2	3
1	(Tunisia) (Botswana)	Mariem Nissaf Bouchlaka; Kelesitse Makgale	6; 3	6; 4
2	(Tunisia) (Botswana)	Nadia Kilani; Kago Phatshwane	6; 2	6; 0
3	(Tunisia) (Botswana)	Azza Abbou / Nadia Kilani; Kelesitse Makgale / Ntswaki Mawela	6; 2	6; 3

== Denmark vs. Botswana ==
Denmark
3
Estoril T.C., Estoril, Portugal
29 March 2000
Red clay (outdoors)

Botswana
0

			1	2	3
1	(Denmark) (Botswana)	Karina-Ildor Jacobsgaard; Ntswaki Mawela	6; 0	6; 0
2	(Denmark) (Botswana)	Rikke Faurfelt; Kago Phatshwane	6; 2	6; 1
3	(Denmark) (Botswana)	Charlotte Aagaard / Eva Dyrberg; Kelesitse Makgale / Ntswaki Mawela	6; 0	6; 2

== Bosnia and Herzegovina vs. Tunisia ==
Bosnia and Herzegovina
3
Estoril T.C., Estoril, Portugal
29 March 2000
Red clay (outdoors)

Tunisia
0

			1	2	3
1	(Bosnia and Herzegovina) (Tunisia)	Asja Tankić; Mariem Nissaf Bouchlaka	6; 1	6; 2
2	(Bosnia and Herzegovina) (Tunisia)	Azra Rešić; Nadia Kilani	6; 0	6; 1
3	(Bosnia and Herzegovina) (Tunisia)	Medina Bajrambašić / Lejla Husić; Azza Abbou / Mariem Nissaf Bouchlaka	6; 2	2; 6	7; 5

== Liechtenstein vs. Iceland ==
Liechtenstein
3
Estoril T.C., Estoril, Portugal
29 March 2000
Red clay (outdoors)

Iceland
0

			1	2	3
1	(Liechtenstein) (Iceland)	Angelika Schädler; Sigurlaug Sigurðardóttir	6; 0	6; 0
2	(Liechtenstein) (Iceland)	Sabrina Vogt; Iris Staub	6; 3	6; 4
3	(Liechtenstein) (Iceland)	Bettina Niedhart / Sidonia Wolfinger; Stella Kristjánsdóttir / Sigurlaug Sigurðardóttir	6; 4	6; 2

== Denmark vs. Iceland ==
Denmark
3
Estoril T.C., Estoril, Portugal
30 March 2000
Red clay (outdoors)

Iceland
0

			1	2	3
1	(Denmark) (Iceland)	Charlotte Aagaard; Sigurlaug Sigurðardóttir	6; 0	6; 0
2	(Denmark) (Iceland)	Eva Dyrberg; Iris Staub	6; 0	6; 0
3	(Denmark) (Iceland)	Rikke Faurfelt / Karina-Ildor Jacobsgaard; Sigurlaug Sigurðardóttir / Iris Staub	6; 0	6; 1

== Bosnia and Herzegovina vs. Botswana ==
Bosnia and Herzegovina
3
Estoril T.C., Estoril, Portugal
30 March 2000
Red clay (outdoors)

Botswana
0

			1	2	3
1	(Bosnia and Herzegovina) (Botswana)	Asja Tankić; Kelesitse Makgale	6; 1	6; 2
2	(Bosnia and Herzegovina) (Botswana)	Azra Rešić; Kago Phatshwane	6; 0	6; 2
3	(Bosnia and Herzegovina) (Botswana)	Medina Bajrambašić / Lejla Husić; Ntswaki Mawela / Phemelo Mogapi	6; 0	6; 1

== Tunisia vs. Liechtenstein ==
Tunisia
3
Estoril T.C., Estoril, Portugal
30 March 2000
Red clay (outdoors)

Liechtenstein
0

			1	2	3
1	(Tunisia) (Liechtenstein)	Mariem Nissaf Bouchlaka; Angelika Schädler	4; 6	3; 6
2	(Tunisia) (Liechtenstein)	Selima Sfar; Sabrina Vogt	6; 2	6; 4
3	(Tunisia) (Liechtenstein)	Nadia Kilani / Selima Sfar; Angelika Schädler / Sidonia Wolfinger	6; 0	6; 4

== Denmark vs. Bosnia and Herzegovina ==
Denmark
3
Estoril T.C., Estoril, Portugal
31 March 2000
Red clay (outdoors)

Bosnia and Herzegovina
0

			1	2	3
1	(Denmark) (Bosnia and Herzegovina)	Charlotte Aagaard; Asja Tankić	6; 0	6; 0
2	(Denmark) (Bosnia and Herzegovina)	Eva Dyrberg; Azra Rešić	6; 2	6; 1
3	(Denmark) (Bosnia and Herzegovina)	Charlotte Aagaard / Eva Dyrberg; Medina Bajrambašić / Lejla Husić	6; 0	6; 2

== Tunisia vs. Iceland ==
Tunisia
3
Estoril T.C., Estoril, Portugal
31 March 2000
Red clay (outdoors)

Iceland
0

			1	2	3
1	(Tunisia) (Iceland)	Azza Abbou; Sigurlaug Sigurðardóttir	6; 2	6; 1
2	(Tunisia) (Iceland)	Selima Sfar; Iris Staub	6; 0	6; 1
3	(Tunisia) (Iceland)	Nadia Kilani / Selima Sfar; Stella Kristjánsdóttir / Sigurlaug Sigurðardóttir	6; 0	6; 1

== Liechtenstein vs. Botswana ==
Liechtenstein
3
Estoril T.C., Estoril, Portugal
31 March 2000
Red clay (outdoors)

Botswana
0

			1	2	3
1	(Liechtenstein) (Botswana)	Angelika Schädler; Kelesitse Makgale	6; 1	6; 0
2	(Liechtenstein) (Botswana)	Sabrina Vogt; Kago Phatshwane	6; 0	7; 5
3	(Liechtenstein) (Botswana)	Bettina Niedhart / Sidonia Wolfinger; Ntswaki Mawela / Phemelo Mogapi	6; 4	6; 0

== Denmark vs. Tunisia ==
Denmark
1
Estoril T.C., Estoril, Portugal
1 April 2000
Red clay (outdoors)

Tunisia
0

			1	2	3
1	(Denmark) (Tunisia)	Charlotte Aagaard; Azza Abbou	6; 0	6; 1
2	(Denmark) (Tunisia)	Eva Dyrberg; Selima Sfar				not played
3	(Denmark) (Tunisia)					not played

== Bosnia and Herzegovina vs. Liechtenstein ==
Bosnia and Herzegovina
1
Estoril T.C., Estoril, Portugal
1 April 2000
Red clay (outdoors)

Liechtenstein
0

			1	2	3
1	(Bosnia and Herzegovina) (Liechtenstein)	Asja Tankić; Angelika Schädler	6; 1	6; 2
2	(Bosnia and Herzegovina) (Liechtenstein)	Azra Rešić; Sabrina Vogt				not played
3	(Bosnia and Herzegovina) (Liechtenstein)					not played

== Botswana vs. Iceland ==
Botswana
1
Estoril T.C., Estoril, Portugal
1 April 2000
Red clay (outdoors)

Iceland
0

			1	2	3
1	(Botswana) (Iceland)	Kelesitse Makgale; Stella Kristjánsdóttir	6; 2	7; 5
2	(Botswana) (Iceland)	Kago Phatshwane; Iris Staub	0; 2			not completed
3	(Botswana) (Iceland)					not played

- Denmark placed first in this group and thus advanced to Group I for 2001, where they placed last in their pool of five, and was thus relegated back to Group II for 2002.

== See also ==
- Fed Cup structure
