= 1999 Dreamland Egypt Classic =

- Date: 19–25 April
- Edition: Only
- Category: Tier III
- Draw: 30S / 16D
- Prize money: $180,000
- Surface: Clay / outdoor
- Location: Cairo, Egypt

Champions

Singles
- (Spain) Arantxa Sánchez Vicario

Doubles
- (Belgium) Laurence Courtois / (Spain) Arantxa Sánchez Vicario
Dreamland Egypt Classic

The 1999 Dreamland Egypt Classic was a women's tennis tournament played on outdoor clay courts in Cairo, Egypt that was part of Tier III of the 1999 WTA Tour. The tournament was held from 19 April through 25 April 1999. First-seeded Arantxa Sánchez Vicario won the singles title.

== Finals ==
=== Singles ===
(Spain) Arantxa Sánchez Vicario defeated (Romania) Irina Spîrlea, 6–1, 6–0

- It was Sánchez Vicario's 1st title of the year and the 85th of her career.

=== Doubles ===
(Belgium) Laurence Courtois / (Spain) Arantxa Sánchez Vicario defeated (Romania) Irina Spîrlea / (Netherlands) Caroline Vis, 7–5, 1–6, 7–6^{(7–3)}

== Entrants ==
=== Seeds ===
Country	Player	Rank	Seed
ESP	Arantxa Sánchez Vicario	7	1
FRA	Mary Pierce	8	2
SUI	Patty Schnyder	10	3
BLR	Natasha Zvereva	17	4
ROU	Irina Spîrlea	20	5
ESP	Magüi Serna	26	6
ISR	Anna Smashnova	46	7
GER	Barbara Rittner	50	8

=== Other entrants ===
The following players received wildcards into the singles main draw:

- (Egypt) Marwa El Wany
- (Australia) Jelena Dokić

The following players received wildcards into the doubles main draw:

- (Egypt) Marwa El Wany / (Egypt) Yomna Farid

The following players received entry from the singles qualifying draw:

- (Spain) Mariam Ramon Climent
- (Belgium) Laurence Courtois
- (Morocco) Bahia Mouhtassine
- (Spain) Ángeles Montolio

The following players received entry as lucky losers:

- (Spain) Eva Bes Ostariz

The following players received entry from the doubles qualifying draw:

- (Russia) Nadia Petrova / (Slovenia) Tina Pisnik
