= 1998 Fed Cup Europe/Africa Zone Group II – Pool A =

International tennis competition

Group A of the 1998 Fed Cup Europe/Africa Zone Group II was one of five pools in the Europe/Africa zone of the 1998 Fed Cup. Five teams competed in a round robin competition, with the top team advancing to Group I for 1999.

	(Denmark) DEN	(Lithuania) LIT	(Tunisia) TUN	(Algeria) ALG	(Cyprus) CYP	Match; W–L	Set; W–L	Game; W–L	Standings
Denmark		3–0	2–1	3–0	2–1	4–0	21–6	146–71	1
Lithuania	0–3		1–2	3–0	3–0	2–2	15–11	121–81	2
Tunisia	1–2	2–1		0–2	2–0	2–2	12–11	85–96	3
Algeria	0–3	0–3	2–0		3–0	2–2	12–13	94–103	4
Cyprus	1–2	0–3	0–2	0–3		0–4	3–16	41–136	5

== Denmark vs. Lithuania ==
Denmark
3
Ali Bey Club, Manavgat, Turkey
5 May 1998
Red clay (outdoors)

Lithuania
0

			1	2	3
1	(Denmark) (Lithuania)	Eva Dyrberg; Ilona Jarkova	6; 0	6; 2
2	(Denmark) (Lithuania)	Charlotte Aagaard; Rūta Deduraitė	6^{2} 7^{7}	6; 1	6; 4
3	(Denmark) (Lithuania)	Eva Dyrberg / Maria Rasmussen; Rūta Deduraitė / Edita Liachovičiūtė	6; 2	6; 0

== Algeria vs. Cyprus ==
Algeria
3
Ali Bey Club, Manavgat, Turkey
5 May 1998
Red clay (outdoors)

Cyprus
0

			1	2	3
1	(Algeria) (Cyprus)	Samira Takourabet; Stephanie Kamberi	6; 1	6; 0
2	(Algeria) (Cyprus)	Lamia Hameurlaine; Andria Hadjioannou	6; 0	6; 3
3	(Algeria) (Cyprus)	Feriel Esseghir / Lamia Hameurlaine; Daphne Nicolatou / Eleni Pilava Papanikolaou	4; 6	6; 1	6; 3

== Denmark vs. Cyprus ==
Denmark
2
Ali Bey Club, Manavgat, Turkey
6 May 1998
Red clay (outdoors)

Cyprus
1

			1	2	3
1	(Denmark) (Cyprus)	Eva Dyrberg; Daphne Nicolatou	0; 6	0; 6
2	(Denmark) (Cyprus)	Charlotte Aagaard; Andria Hadjioannou	6; 0	6; 2
3	(Denmark) (Cyprus)	Rikke Faurfelt / Maria Rasmussen; Stephanie Kamberi / Eleni Pilava Papanikolaou	6; 2	6; 0

== Lithuania vs. Tunisia ==
Lithuania
1
Ali Bey Club, Manavgat, Turkey
6 May 1998
Red clay (outdoors)

Tunisia
2

			1	2	3
1	(Lithuania) (Tunisia)	Edita Liachovičiūtė; Issem Essaies	6; 4	6; 1
2	(Lithuania) (Tunisia)	Rūta Deduraitė; Selima Sfar	0; 6	1; 6
3	(Lithuania) (Tunisia)	Rūta Deduraitė / Edita Liachovičiūtė; Issem Essaies / Selima Sfar	3; 6	1; 6

== Denmark vs. Algeria ==
Denmark
3
Ali Bey Club, Manavgat, Turkey
7 May 1998
Red clay (outdoors)

Algeria
0

			1	2	3
1	(Denmark) (Algeria)	Eva Dyrberg; Siham-Soumeya Ben Nacer	6; 1	6; 1
2	(Denmark) (Algeria)	Charlotte Aagaard; Feriel Esseghir	6; 2	6^{5} 7^{7}	6; 0
3	(Denmark) (Algeria)	Eva Dyrberg / Maria Rasmussen; Feriel Esseghir / Lamia Hameurlaine	6; 2	6; 1

== Tunisia vs. Cyprus ==
Tunisia
3
Ali Bey Club, Manavgat, Turkey
7 May 1998
Red clay (outdoors)

Cyprus
0

			1	2	3
1	(Tunisia) (Cyprus)	Issem Essaies; Stephanie Kamberi	6; 3	6; 1
2	(Tunisia) (Cyprus)	Selima Sfar; Daphne Nicolatou	6; 0	6; 0
3	(Tunisia) (Cyprus)	Issem Essaies / Selima Sfar; Andria Hadjioannou / Eleni Pilava Papanikolaou	6; 0	6; 1

== Denmark vs. Tunisia ==
Denmark
2
Ali Bey Club, Manavgat, Turkey
8 May 1998
Red clay (outdoors)

Tunisia
1

			1	2	3
1	(Denmark) (Tunisia)	Maria Rasmussen; Nadia Kilani	6; 0	6; 0
2	(Denmark) (Tunisia)	Eva Dyrberg; Selima Sfar	7^{7} 6^{2}	6; 2
3	(Denmark) (Tunisia)	Rikke Faurfelt / Maria Rasmussen; Issem Essaies / Selima Sfar	4; 6	7; 5	2; 6

== Lithuania vs. Algeria ==
Lithuania
3
Ali Bey Club, Manavgat, Turkey
8 May 1998
Red clay (outdoors)

Algeria
0

			1	2	3
1	(Lithuania) (Algeria)	Ilona Jarkova; Samira Takourabet	6; 2	6; 0
2	(Lithuania) (Algeria)	Rūta Deduraitė; Lamia Hameurlaine	6; 0	6; 2
3	(Lithuania) (Algeria)	Rūta Deduraitė / Edita Liachovičiūtė; Siham-Soumeya Ben Nacer / Feriel Esseghir	6; 4	4; 6	6; 2

== Lithuania vs. Cyprus ==
Lithuania
3
Ali Bey Club, Manavgat, Turkey
9 May 1998
Red clay (outdoors)

Cyprus
0

			1	2	3
1	(Lithuania) (Cyprus)	Edita Liachovičiūtė; Stephanie Kamberi	6; 1	6; 0
2	(Lithuania) (Cyprus)	Rūta Deduraitė; Daphne Nicolatou	6; 0	6; 1
3	(Lithuania) (Cyprus)	Ilona Jarkova / Goda Kuliešytė; Andria Hadjioannou / Daphne Nicolatou	6; 2	6; 2

== Tunisia vs. Algeria ==
Tunisia
0
Ali Bey Club, Manavgat, Turkey
9 May 1998
Red clay (outdoors)

Algeria
2

			1	2	3
1	(Tunisia) (Algeria)	Nadia Kilani; Siham-Soumeya Ben Nacer	2; 6	2; 6
2	(Tunisia) (Algeria)	Issem Essaies; Feriel Esseghir	1; 6	2; 6
3	(Tunisia) (Algeria)	Issem Essaies; Siham-Soumeya Ben Nacer				not played

- Denmark placed first in this group and thus advanced to Group I for 1999, where they placed last in their pool of four and was thus relegated back to Group II for 2000.

== See also ==
- Fed Cup structure
