= 2004 Fed Cup Europe/Africa Zone Group II – Pool A =

Group A of the 2004 Fed Cup Europe/Africa Zone Group II was one of two pools in the Europe/Africa Zone Group II of the 2004 Fed Cup. Four teams competed in a round robin competition, with the top two teams and the bottom two teams proceeding to their respective sections of the play-offs: the top two teams play for advancement to Group I, while the bottom two teams face potential relegation to Group III.

		(United Kingdom) GBR	(Egypt) EGY	(Turkey) TUR	(Romania) ROU	RR; W–L	Set; W–L	Game; W–L	Standings
51	Great Britain		3–0	3–0	2–1	3–0	17–3	113–53	1
62	Egypt	0–3		3–0	3–0	0–3	0–18	29–109	4
67	Turkey	0–3	0–3		3–0	1–2	6–12	67–90	3
72	Romania	1–2	0–3	0–3		2–1	15–5	105–62	2

== Great Britain vs. Egypt ==
Great Britain
3
Marsa, Malta
26 April 2004
Hard (outdoors)

Egypt
0

			1	2	3
1	(United Kingdom) (Egypt)	Amanda Keen; Noha Mohsen	6; 2	6; 0
2	(United Kingdom) (Egypt)	Anne Keothavong; Yomna Farid	6; 0	6; 1
3	(United Kingdom) (Egypt)	Elena Baltacha / Jane O'Donoghue; Yomna Farid / Noha Mohsen	6; 0	6; 3

== Turkey vs. Romania ==
Turkey
0
Marsa, Malta
26 April 2004
Hard (outdoors)

Romania
3

			1	2	3
1	(Turkey) (Romania)	Çiğdem Duru; Gabriela Niculescu	3; 6	1; 6
2	(Turkey) (Romania)	Pemra Özgen; Simona Matei	3; 6	3; 6
3	(Turkey) (Romania)	Çağla Büyükakçay / Pemra Özgen; Gabriela Niculescu / Monica Niculescu	2; 6	4; 6

== Great Britain vs. Turkey ==
Great Britain
3
Marsa, Malta
27 April 2004
Hard (outdoors)

Turkey
0

			1	2	3
1	(United Kingdom) (Turkey)	Elena Baltacha; Çiğdem Duru	6; 1	6; 0
2	(United Kingdom) (Turkey)	Amanda Keen; Pemra Özgen	6; 4	7^{7} 6^{3}
3	(United Kingdom) (Turkey)	Elena Baltacha / Jane O'Donoghue; Çağla Büyükakçay / Pemra Özgen	6; 0	6; 3

== Egypt vs. Turkey ==
Egypt
0
Marsa, Malta
28 April 2004
Hard (outdoors)

Turkey
3

			1	2	3
1	(Egypt) (Turkey)	Noha Mohsen; Çiğdem Duru	4; 6	2; 6
2	(Egypt) (Turkey)	Yomna Farid; Pemra Özgen	2; 6	3; 6
3	(Egypt) (Turkey)	Aliaa Fakhry / Yomna Farid; Çiğdem Duru / Pemra Özgen	5; 7	1; 6

== Great Britain vs. Romania ==
Great Britain
2
Marsa, Malta
29 April 2004
Hard (outdoors)

Romania
1

			1	2	3
1	(United Kingdom) (Romania)	Elena Baltacha; Monica Niculescu	6; 1	6; 4
2	(United Kingdom) (Romania)	Anne Keothavong; Simona Matei	3; 6	6; 3	6; 0
3	(United Kingdom) (Romania)	Amanda Keen / Jane O'Donoghue; Gabriela Niculescu / Monica Niculescu	6^{6} 7^{8}	7^{7} 6^{3}	0; 6

== Egypt vs. Romania ==
Egypt
0
Marsa, Malta
30 April 2004
Hard (outdoors)

Romania
3

			1	2	3
1	(Egypt) (Romania)	Aliaa Fakhry; Monica Niculescu	0; 6	3; 6
2	(Egypt) (Romania)	Yomna Farid; Simona Matei	0; 6	3; 6
3	(Egypt) (Romania)	Aliaa Fakhry / Noha Mohsen; Gabriela Niculescu / Monica Niculescu	0; 6	0; 6

== See also ==
- Fed Cup structure
