= 2002 Fed Cup Europe/Africa Zone Group II – Pool D =

International tennis competition

Group D of the 2002 Fed Cup Europe/Africa Zone Group II was one of four pools in the Europe/Africa Zone Group II of the 2002 Fed Cup. Three teams competed in a round robin competition, with the team placings determining where they will be positioned within the play-offs.

	(Republic of Ireland) IRL	(Finland) FIN	(Egypt) EGY	(Botswana) BOT	RR; W–L	Set; W–L	Game; W–L	Standings
Ireland		3–0	3–0	3–0	3–0	18–0	108–21	1
Finland	0–3		3–0	3–0	2–1	12–6	82–53	2
Egypt	0–3	0–3		3–0	1–2	6–12	59–83	3
Botswana	0–3	0–3	0–3		0–3	0–18	16–108	4

== Ireland vs. Botswana ==
Ireland
3
Pretoria, South Africa
9 April 2002
Hard (outdoors)

Botswana
0

			1	2	3
1	(Republic of Ireland) (Botswana)	Elsa O'Riain; Lesedi Ramocha	6; 0	6; 0
2	(Republic of Ireland) (Botswana)	Kelly Liggan; Razalia Phethu	6; 1	6; 0
3	(Republic of Ireland) (Botswana)	Claire Curran / Yvonne Doyle; Tapiwa Marobela / Phemelo Mogapi	6; 0	6; 0

== Finland vs. Egypt ==
Finland
3
Pretoria, South Africa
9 April 2002
Hard (outdoors)

Egypt
0

			1	2	3
1	(Finland) (Egypt)	Maarit Nieminen; Dina Khalil	6; 3	6; 2
2	(Finland) (Egypt)	Emma Laine; Yomna Farid	6; 3	6; 3
3	(Finland) (Egypt)	Maarit Nieminen / Piia Suomalainen; Nermien Abaza / Dina Khalil	6; 1	6; 1

== Ireland vs. Finland ==
Ireland
3
Pretoria, South Africa
10 April 2002
Hard (outdoors)

Finland
0

			1	2	3
1	(Republic of Ireland) (Finland)	Elsa O'Riain; Maarit Nieminen	6; 4	6; 0
2	(Republic of Ireland) (Finland)	Kelly Liggan; Emma Laine	6; 1	6; 1
3	(Republic of Ireland) (Finland)	Claire Curran / Yvonne Doyle; Maarit Nieminen / Piia Suomalainen	6; 2	6; 2

== Egypt vs. Botswana ==
Egypt
3
Pretoria, South Africa
10 April 2002
Hard (outdoors)

Botswana
0

			1	2	3
1	(Egypt) (Botswana)	Noha Mohsen; Razalia Phethu	6; 2	6; 1
2	(Egypt) (Botswana)	Yomna Farid; Tapiwa Marobela	6; 2	6; 2
3	(Egypt) (Botswana)	Yomna Farid / Dina Khalil; Tapiwa Marobela / Razalia Phethu	6; 2	6; 2

== Ireland vs. Egypt ==
Ireland
3
Pretoria, South Africa
11 April 2002
Hard (outdoors)

Egypt
0

			1	2	3
1	(Republic of Ireland) (Egypt)	Yvonne Doyle; Noha Mohsen	6; 1	6; 2
2	(Republic of Ireland) (Egypt)	Kelly Liggan; Dina Khalil	6; 3	6; 2
3	(Republic of Ireland) (Egypt)	Claire Curran / Elsa O'Riain; Yomna Farid / Dina Khalil	6; 1	6; 1

== Finland vs. Botswana ==
Finland
3
Pretoria, South Africa
11 April 2002
Hard (outdoors)

Botswana
0

			1	2	3
1	(Finland) (Botswana)	Piia Suomalainen; Phemelo Mogapi	6; 0	6; 1
2	(Finland) (Botswana)	Emma Laine; Tapiwa Marobela	6; 0	6; 0
3	(Finland) (Botswana)	Emma Laine / Maarit Nieminen; Tapiwa Marobela / Lesedi Ramocha	6; 1	6; 2

== See also ==
- Fed Cup structure
