= 2004 Fed Cup Europe/Africa Zone Group II – play-offs =

International tennis competition play-offs

The play-offs of the 2004 Fed Cup Europe/Africa Zone Group II were the final stages of the Group I Zonal Competition involving teams from Europe and Africa. Using the positions determined in their pools, the nine teams faced off to determine their placing in the 2004 Fed Cup Europe/Africa Zone Group II. The top two teams advanced to Group I for next year, and the bottom two teams were relegated down to the Europe/Africa Zone Group III.

Placing	Pool A	Pool B
1	Great Britain	Luxembourg
2	Romania	Ireland
3		Latvia
4	Turkey	Georgia
5	Egypt	Finland

== Promotion play-offs ==
The first and second placed teams of each pool were placed against each other in two head-to-head rounds. The winner of the rounds advanced to Group I.

=== Great Britain vs. Ireland ===
Great Britain
2
Marsa, Malta
1 May 2004
Hard (outdoors)

Ireland
0

			1	2	3
1	(United Kingdom) (Republic of Ireland)	Elena Baltacha; Yvonne Doyle	6; 1	7; 5
2	(United Kingdom) (Republic of Ireland)	Anne Keothavong; Kelly Liggan	6; 2	3; 6	2; 2	retired
3	(United Kingdom) (Republic of Ireland)	Elena Baltacha / Anne Keothavong; Yvonne Doyle / Kelly Liggan				not played

=== Romania vs. Luxembourg ===
Romania
1
Marsa, Malta
1 May 2004
Hard (outdoors)

Luxembourg
2

			1	2	3
1	(Romania) (Luxembourg)	Monica Niculescu; Anne Kremer	0; 6	5; 7
2	(Romania) (Luxembourg)	Simona Matei; Claudine Schaul	3; 6	4; 6
3	(Romania) (Luxembourg)	Gabriela Niculescu / Monica Niculescu; Mandy Minella / Lynn Philippe	6; 3	6; 4

== Fifth ==
As there was only four teams from Pool A as opposed to the five from Pool B, the third-placed team from Pool B (Latvia) had no equivalent to play against. Thus the Latvians were automatically allocated fifth place.

== Relegation play-offs ==
The last and second-to-last placed teams of each pool were placed against each other in two head-to-head rounds. The losing team of the rounds were relegated to Group III for next year.

=== Turkey vs. Finland ===
Turkey
0
Marsa, Malta
1 May 2004
Hard (outdoors)

Finland
3

			1	2	3
1	(Turkey) (Finland)	Çiğdem Duru; Essi Laine	6; 3	4; 6	3; 6
2	(Turkey) (Finland)	Pemra Özgen; Emma Laine	2; 6	0; 6
3	(Turkey) (Finland)	Çiğdem Duru / Pemra Özgen; Emma Laine / Essi Laine	4; 6	2; 6

=== Egypt vs. Georgia ===
Egypt
0
Marsa, Malta
1 May 2004
Hard (outdoors)

Georgia
3

			1	2	3
1	(Egypt) (Georgia (country))	Aliaa Fakhry; Sofia Melikishvili	0; 6	4; 6
2	(Egypt) (Georgia (country))	Yomna Farid; Salome Devidze	1; 6	4; 6
3	(Egypt) (Georgia (country))	Aliaa Fakhry / Yomna Farid; Tinatin Kavlashvili / Sofia Melikishvili	4; 6	3; 6

== Final Placements ==
Placing	Teams
Promoted	Great Britain
Promoted	Luxembourg
Third	Ireland
Third	Romania
Fifth	Latvia
Sixth	Finland
Sixth	Georgia
Relegated	Turkey
Relegated	Egypt

- Great Britain and Luxembourg advanced to Group I, where they placed eleventh and ninth respectively.
- Turkey and Egypt were relegated down to Group III for the next year, where they placed third and fifth respectively.

== See also ==
- Fed Cup structure
