= 2002 Fed Cup Europe/Africa Zone Group I – play-offs =

International tennis competition play-offs

The play-offs of the 2002 Fed Cup Europe/Africa Zone Group I were the final stages of the Group I Zonal Competition involving teams from Europe and Africa. Those that qualified for this stage placed first and second in their respective pools.

Placing	Pool A	Pool B	Pool C	Pool D
1	Slovenia	Israel	Bulgaria	Luxembourg
2	Ukraine	Netherlands	Estonia	FR Yugoslavia
3	Belarus	Romania	Georgia	Poland
4	Greece	Bosnia and Herzegovina	Portugal	Turkey

The eight teams were then randomly paired up the team from a different placing of another group for a play-off tie, with the winners being promoted to the World Group play-offs.

== Slovenia vs. Yugoslavia ==
Slovenia
2
Antalya, Turkey
27 April 2002
Red clay (outdoors)

FR Yugoslavia
0

			1	2	3
1	(Slovenia) (Federal Republic of Yugoslavia)	Maja Matevžič; Jelena Janković	6; 2	3; 6	6; 1
2	(Slovenia) (Federal Republic of Yugoslavia)	Tina Pisnik; Dragana Zarić	6; 1	6; 3
3	(Slovenia) (Federal Republic of Yugoslavia)					not played

- Slovenia advanced to the World Group play-offs, where they were drawn against Ukraine. They won 4–1, and thus advanced to the World Group for next year.

== Israel vs. Estonia ==
Israel
2
Antalya, Turkey
27 April 2002
Red clay (outdoors)

Estonia
0

			1	2	3
1	(Israel) (Estonia)	Tzipora Obziler; Maret Ani	6; 3	6; 3
2	(Israel) (Estonia)	Anna Smashnova; Kaia Kanepi	6; 1	6; 3
3	(Israel) (Estonia)					not played

- Israel advanced to the World Group play-offs, where they were drawn against United States. They lost 0–5, and thus were relegated back to Group I for next year.

== Ukraine vs. Bulgaria ==
Ukraine
2
Antalya, Turkey
27 April 2002
Red clay (outdoors)

Bulgaria
1

			1	2	3
1	(Ukraine) (Bulgaria)	Alona Bondarenko; Desislava Topalova	6; 3	5; 7	4; 6
2	(Ukraine) (Bulgaria)	Yuliya Beygelzimer; Magdalena Maleeva	6; 3	6; 4
3	(Ukraine) (Bulgaria)	Yuliya Beygelzimer / Alona Bondarenko; Magdalena Maleeva / Desislava Topalova	6; 4	6; 0

- Ukraine advanced to the World Group play-offs, where they were drawn against Slovenia. They lost 1–4, and thus were relegated back to Group I for next year.

== Netherlands vs. Luxembourg ==
Netherlands
2
Antalya, Turkey
27 April 2002
Red clay (outdoors)

Luxembourg
1

			1	2	3
1	(Netherlands) (Luxembourg)	Kristie Boogert; Claudine Schaul	7; 5	3; 6	5; 7
2	(Netherlands) (Luxembourg)	Miriam Oremans; Anne Kremer	6; 4	2; 6	6; 4
3	(Netherlands) (Luxembourg)	Kristie Boogert / Miriam Oremans; Anne Kremer / Claudine Schaul	3; 6	7^{7} 6^{1}	6; 2

- Netherlands advanced to the World Group play-offs, where they were drawn against Australia. They lost 2–3, and thus were relegated back to Group I for next year.

== See also ==
- Fed Cup structure
