= 1996 Fed Cup Europe/Africa Zone Group II – Pool B =

International tennis competition

Group B of the 1996 Fed Cup Europe/Africa Zone Group II was one of four pools in the Europe/Africa zone of the 1996 Fed Cup. Four teams competed in a round robin competition, with the top two teams advancing to the play-offs.

	(Finland) FIN	(Turkey) TUR	(Tunisia) TUN	(Liechtenstein) LIE	(Cyprus) CYP	Match; W–L	Set; W–L	Game; W–L	Standings
Finland		3–0	2–1	3–0	3–0	4–0	22–3	143–47	1
Turkey	0–3		3–0	3–0	3–0	3–1	18–6	123–60	2
Tunisia	1–2	0–3		3–0	3–0	2–2	15–10	106–93	3
Liechtenstein	0–3	0–3	0–3		2–1	1–3	5–20	55–131	4
Cyprus	0–3	0–3	0–3	1–2		0–4	2–23	40–144	5

== Finland vs. Turkey ==
Finland
3
Ramat HaSharon, Israel
25 March 1996
Hard (outdoors)

Turkey
0

			1	2	3
1	(Finland) (Turkey)	Nanne Dahlman; Gülberk Gültekin	6; 0	7; 5
2	(Finland) (Turkey)	Hanna-Katri Aalto; İpek Şenoğlu	6; 1	6; 1
3	(Finland) (Turkey)	Nanne Dahlman / Linda Jansson; Gülberk Gültekin / İpek Şenoğlu	6; 2	6; 4

== Tunisia vs. Liechtenstein ==
Tunisia
3
Ramat HaSharon, Israel
25 March 1996
Hard (outdoors)

Liechtenstein
0

			1	2	3
1	(Tunisia) (Liechtenstein)	Selima Sfar; Angelika Schädler	6; 2	6; 1
2	(Tunisia) (Liechtenstein)	Issem Essaies; Jeannine Niedhardt	6; 2	6; 1
3	(Tunisia) (Liechtenstein)	Issem Essaies / Selima Sfar; Nicola Corn / Jeannine Niedhardt	6; 4	6; 2

== Finland vs. Tunisia ==
Finland
3
Ramat HaSharon, Israel
26 March 1996
Hard (outdoors)

Tunisia
0

			1	2	3
1	(Finland) (Tunisia)	Nanne Dahlman; Selima Sfar	3; 6	4; 6
2	(Finland) (Tunisia)	Hanna-Katri Aalto; Aicha Ferjani	6; 0	6; 1
3	(Finland) (Tunisia)	Nanne Dahlman / Linda Jansson; Aicha Ferjani / Selima Sfar	6; 3	3; 6	6; 2

== Liechtenstein vs. Cyprus ==
Liechtenstein
2
Ramat HaSharon, Israel
26 March 1996
Hard (outdoors)

Cyprus
1

			1	2	3
1	(Liechtenstein) (Cyprus)	Angelika Schädler; Andria Hadjioannou	6; 1	6; 1
2	(Liechtenstein) (Cyprus)	Jeannine Niedhardt; Eleni Pilava Papanikolaou	6; 4	2; 6	4; 6
3	(Liechtenstein) (Cyprus)	Andrea Hoch / Angelika Schädler; Anna Anastasiou / Eleni Pilava Papanikolaou	6; 2	6; 3

== Turkey vs. Liechtenstein ==
Turkey
3
Ramat HaSharon, Israel
27 March 1996
Hard (outdoors)

Liechtenstein
0

			1	2	3
1	(Turkey) (Liechtenstein)	Gülberk Gültekin; Angelika Schädler	6; 1	6; 1
2	(Turkey) (Liechtenstein)	İpek Şenoğlu; Nicola Corn	6; 1	6; 3
3	(Turkey) (Liechtenstein)	Gülberk Gültekin / İpek Şenoğlu; Andrea Hoch / Angelika Schädler	6; 1	6; 2

== Tunisia vs. Cyprus ==
Tunisia
3
Ramat HaSharon, Israel
27 March 1996
Hard (outdoors)

Cyprus
0

			1	2	3
1	(Tunisia) (Cyprus)	Selima Sfar; Andria Hadjioannou	6; 1	6; 1
2	(Tunisia) (Cyprus)	Aicha Ferjani; Anna Anastasiou	6; 3	6; 4
3	(Tunisia) (Cyprus)	Issem Essaies / Selima Sfar; Andria Hadjioannou / Eleni Pilava Papanikolaou	6; 3	6; 0

== Finland vs. Liechtenstein ==
Finland
3
Ramat HaSharon, Israel
28 March 1996
Hard (outdoors)

Liechtenstein
0

			1	2	3
1	(Finland) (Liechtenstein)	Nanne Dahlman; Angelika Schädler	6; 2	6; 0
2	(Finland) (Liechtenstein)	Hanna-Katri Aalto; Andrea Hoch	6; 1	6; 0
3	(Finland) (Liechtenstein)	Hanna-Katri Aalto / Nanne Dahlman; Nicola Corn / Angelika Schädler	6; 3	6; 2

== Turkey vs. Cyprus ==
Turkey
3
Ramat HaSharon, Israel
28 March 1996
Hard (outdoors)

Cyprus
0

			1	2	3
1	(Turkey) (Cyprus)	Gülberk Gültekin; Anna Anastasiou	6; 1	6; 0
2	(Turkey) (Cyprus)	Seden Özlü; Eleni Pilava Papanikolaou	6; 1	6; 0
3	(Turkey) (Cyprus)	Seden Özlü / İpek Şenoğlu; Anna Anastasiou / Eleni Pilava Papanikolaou	6; 2	6; 0

== Finland vs. Cyprus ==
Finland
3
Ramat HaSharon, Israel
29 March 1996
Hard (outdoors)

Cyprus
0

			1	2	3
1	(Finland) (Cyprus)	Nanne Dahlman; Andria Hadjioannou	6; 2	6; 0
2	(Finland) (Cyprus)	Hanna-Katri Aalto; Anna Anastasiou	6; 0	6; 0
3	(Finland) (Cyprus)	Hanna-Katri Aalto / Nanne Dahlman; Anna Anastasiou / Eleni Pilava Papanikolaou	6; 0	6; 0

== Turkey vs. Tunisia ==
Turkey
3
Ramat HaSharon, Israel
29 March 1996
Hard (outdoors)

Tunisia
0

			1	2	3
1	(Turkey) (Tunisia)	Gülberk Gültekin; Selima Sfar	6; 3	6; 0
2	(Turkey) (Tunisia)	İpek Şenoğlu; Issem Essaies	6; 0	6; 4
3	(Turkey) (Tunisia)	Gülberk Gültekin / İpek Şenoğlu; Issem Essaies / Aicha Ferjani	6; 2	6; 1

== See also ==
- Fed Cup structure
