= 1999 Dreamland Egypt Classic – Doubles =

Doubles
- 1999 Dreamland Egypt Classic

Final
- Champions: (Belgium) Laurence Courtois (Spain) Arantxa Sánchez Vicario
- Runners-up: (Romania) Irina Spîrlea (Netherlands) Caroline Vis
- Score: 7–5, 1–6, 7–6^{(7–3)}

Events
Singles	Doubles
← 1998 ·	Dreamland Egypt Classic	· 2000 →

The 1999 Dreamland Egypt Classic doubles was the doubles event of the only edition of the Dreamland Egypt Classic; a WTA Tier III tournament and then the most prestigious women's tennis tournament held in Africa. Laurence Courtois and Arantxa Sánchez Vicario won in the final 7–5, 1–6, 7–6^{(7–3)} against Irina Spîrlea and Caroline Vis.

== Seeds ==
1. (Romania) Irina Spîrlea / (Netherlands) Caroline Vis (final)
2. (Belgium) Laurence Courtois / (Spain) Arantxa Sánchez Vicario (champions)
3. (Belgium) Sabine Appelmans / (Netherlands) Kristie Boogert (semifinals)
4. (France) Caroline Dhenin / (Germany) Barbara Rittner (quarterfinals)

== Draw ==
=== Key ===
- Q = Qualifier
- WC = Wild card
- LL = Lucky loser
- Alt = Alternate
- SE = Special exempt
- PR = Protected ranking
- ITF = ITF entry
- JE = Junior exempt
- w/o = Walkover
- r = Retired
- d = Defaulted
- SR = Special ranking

First round
1	(Romania) I Spîrlea (Netherlands) C Vis	6	6
(Australia) J Dokić (Australia) N Pratt	1	2
(Spain) E Bes Ostariz (Argentina) M-F Landa	3	2
(France) A Dechaume-Balleret (Italy) L Golarsa	6	6
4	(France) C Dhenin (Germany) B Rittner	6	6
(Italy) F Perfetti (Italy) M P Zavagli	2	1
(Spain) C Martínez Granados (Tunisia) S Sfar	4	2
(Switzerland) E Gagliardi (Hungary) K Marosi	6	6
Q	(Russia) N Petrova (Slovenia) T Pisnik	6	6
WC	(Egypt) M El Wany (Egypt) Y Farid	0	2
(Canada) M Drake (Australia) L Pleming	2	3
3	(Belgium) S Appelmans (Netherlands) K Boogert	6	6
(Czech Republic) M Nekvapilová (Czech Republic) H Šromová	6	6
(Spain) M Ramon Climent (Romania) A Vanc	2	0
(Bulgaria) S Krivencheva (Czech Republic) L Varmužová	1	0
2	(Belgium) L Courtois (Spain) A Sánchez Vicario	6	6

Quarterfinals
1	(Romania) I Spîrlea (Netherlands) C Vis	6	6
(France) A Dechaume-Balleret (Italy) L Golarsa	2	2
4	(France) C Dhenin (Germany) B Rittner	3	4
(Switzerland) E Gagliardi (Hungary) K Marosi	6	6
Q	(Russia) N Petrova (Slovenia) T Pisnik	1	1
3	(Belgium) S Appelmans (Netherlands) K Boogert	6	6
(Czech Republic) M Nekvapilová (Czech Republic) H Šromová	4	4
2	(Belgium) L Courtois (Spain) A Sánchez Vicario	6	6

Semifinals
1	(Romania) I Spîrlea (Netherlands) C Vis	6	7^{13}
(Switzerland) E Gagliardi (Hungary) K Marosi	0	6^{11}
3	(Belgium) S Appelmans (Netherlands) K Boogert	4	5
2	(Belgium) L Courtois (Spain) A Sánchez Vicario	6	7

Final
1	(Romania) I Spîrlea (Netherlands) C Vis	5	6	6^{3}
2	(Belgium) L Courtois (Spain) A Sánchez Vicario	7	1	7^{7}

== Qualifying ==
=== Seeds ===
1. (Argentina) Celeste Contín / (Morocco) Bahia Mouhtassine (second round)
2. (Israel) Nataly Cahana / (Israel) Tzipora Obziler (qualifying competition)

=== Qualifiers ===
1. (Russia) Nadia Petrova / (Slovenia) Tina Pisnik

== Qualifying draw ==
=== Key ===
- Q = Qualifier
- WC = Wild card
- LL = Lucky loser
- Alt = Alternate
- SE = Special exempt
- PR = Protected ranking
- ITF = ITF entry
- JE = Junior exempt
- w/o = Walkover
- r = Retired
- d = Defaulted
- SR = Special ranking

First round
1	(Argentina) Celeste Contín (Morocco) Bahia Mouhtassine	8
(Egypt) Sara Abaza (Egypt) Dalia El Sheikh	1
(Romania) Raluca Sandu (United States) Meghann Shaughnessy	3
(Russia) Nadia Petrova (Slovenia) Tina Pisnik	8
(Germany) Angelika Bachmann (Germany) Lydia Steinbach	8
(Australia) Mireille Dittmann (Japan) Riei Kawamata	6
(Poland) Agnieszka Abram (Poland) Anna Mogilnicka	0
2	(Israel) Nataly Cahana (Israel) Tzipora Obziler	8

Second round
1	(Argentina) Celeste Contín (Morocco) Bahia Mouhtassine	7
(Russia) Nadia Petrova (Slovenia) Tina Pisnik	9
(Germany) Angelika Bachmann (Germany) Lydia Steinbach	2
2	(Israel) Nataly Cahana (Israel) Tzipora Obziler	8

Qualifying competition
(Russia) Nadia Petrova (Slovenia) Tina Pisnik	8
2	(Israel) Nataly Cahana (Israel) Tzipora Obziler	6
