= 2004 Fed Cup Europe/Africa Zone Group II – Pool B =

International tennis competition

Group B of the 2004 Fed Cup Europe/Africa Zone Group II was one of two pools in the Europe/Africa Zone Group II of the 2004 Fed Cup. Four teams competed in a round robin competition, with the top two teams and the bottom two teams proceeding to their respective sections of the play-offs: the top two teams play for advancement to Group I, while the bottom two teams face potential relegation to Group III.

		(Finland) FIN	(Luxembourg) LUX	(Latvia) LAT	(Republic of Ireland) IRL	(Georgia (country)) GEO	Match; W–L	Set; W–L	Game; W–L	Standings
53	Finland		0–3	1–2	0–3	1–2	0–4	4–20	73–136	5
60	Luxembourg	3–0		2–1	2–1	3–0	4–0	20–4	134–75	1
63	Latvia	2–1	1–2		0–3	2–1	2–2	9–16	114–126	3
64	Ireland	3–0	1–2	3–0		3–0	3–1	20–5	143–95	2
70	Georgia	2–1	0–3	1–2	0–3		1–3	6–18	94–126	4

== Luxembourg vs. Latvia ==
Luxembourg
2
Marsa, Malta
26 April 2004
Hard (outdoors)

Latvia
1

			1	2	3
1	(Luxembourg) (Latvia)	Anne Kremer; Līga Dekmeijere	6; 2	6; 0
2	(Luxembourg) (Latvia)	Claudine Schaul; Anžela Žguna	6; 3	6; 3
3	(Luxembourg) (Latvia)	Mandy Minella / Claudine Schaul; Līga Dekmeijere / Irina Kuzmina	4; 6	2; 6

== Ireland vs. Georgia ==
Ireland
3
Marsa, Malta
26 April 2004
Hard (outdoors)

Georgia
0

			1	2	3
1	(Republic of Ireland) (Georgia (country))	Yvonne Doyle; Sofia Melikishvili	7; 5	6; 4
2	(Republic of Ireland) (Georgia (country))	Kelly Liggan; Salome Devidze	6; 4	6; 1
3	(Republic of Ireland) (Georgia (country))	Yvonne Doyle / Karen Nugent; Salome Devidze / Tinatin Kavlashvili	6; 4	6; 1

== Finland vs. Luxembourg ==
Finland
0
Marsa, Malta
27 April 2004
Hard (outdoors)

Luxembourg
3

			1	2	3
1	(Finland) (Luxembourg)	Essi Laine; Anne Kremer	1; 6	2; 6
2	(Finland) (Luxembourg)	Carina Björnström; Claudine Schaul	1; 6	3; 6
3	(Finland) (Luxembourg)	Carina Björnström / Essi Laine; Anne Kremer / Mandy Minella	1; 6	3; 6

== Latvia vs. Georgia ==
Latvia
2
Marsa, Malta
27 April 2004
Hard (outdoors)

Georgia
1

			1	2	3
1	(Latvia) (Georgia (country))	Līga Dekmeijere; Sofia Melikishvili	6; 3	4; 6	2; 6
2	(Latvia) (Georgia (country))	Anžela Žguna; Salome Devidze	6; 3	7^{7} 6^{2}
3	(Latvia) (Georgia (country))	Līga Dekmeijere / Irina Kuzmina; Salome Devidze / Tinatin Kavlashvili	6; 3	6; 4

== Finland vs. Ireland ==
Finland
0
Marsa, Malta
28 April 2004
Hard (outdoors)

Ireland
3

			1	2	3
1	(Finland) (Republic of Ireland)	Essi Laine; Yvonne Doyle	3; 6	3; 6
2	(Finland) (Republic of Ireland)	Carina Björnström; Kelly Liggan	1; 6	1; 6
3	(Finland) (Republic of Ireland)	Carina Björnström / Essi Laine; Karen Nugent / Elsa O'Riain	6^{4} 7^{7}	0; 6

== Luxembourg vs. Georgia ==
Luxembourg
3
Marsa, Malta
28 April 2004
Hard (outdoors)

Georgia
0

			1	2	3
1	(Luxembourg) (Georgia (country))	Anne Kremer; Tinatin Kavlashvili	6; 2	6; 0
2	(Luxembourg) (Georgia (country))	Claudine Schaul; Salome Devidze	6; 3	6; 3
3	(Luxembourg) (Georgia (country))	Anne Kremer / Claudine Schaul; Salome Devidze / Tinatin Kavlashvili	7; 5			retired

== Finland vs. Latvia ==
Finland
1
Marsa, Malta
29 April 2004
Hard (outdoors)

Latvia
2

			1	2	3
1	(Finland) (Latvia)	Essi Laine; Līga Dekmeijere	5; 7	3; 6
2	(Finland) (Latvia)	Emma Laine; Anžela Žguna	7^{7} 6^{5}	6; 1
3	(Finland) (Latvia)	Carina Björnström / Emma Laine; Līga Dekmeijere / Irina Kuzmina	4; 6	2; 6

== Luxembourg vs. Ireland ==
Luxembourg
0
Marsa, Malta
29 April 2004
Hard (outdoors)

Ireland
3

			1	2	3
1	(Luxembourg) (Republic of Ireland)	Anne Kremer; Yvonne Doyle	5; 7	4; 6
2	(Luxembourg) (Republic of Ireland)	Claudine Schaul; Kelly Liggan	3; 6	4; 6
3	(Luxembourg) (Republic of Ireland)	Anne Kremer / Mandy Minella; Yvonne Doyle / Karen Nugent	6^{3} 7^{7}	3; 6

== Finland vs. Georgia ==
Finland
1
Marsa, Malta
30 April 2004
Hard (outdoors)

Georgia
2

			1	2	3
1	(Finland) (Georgia (country))	Carina Björnström; Sofia Melikishvili	1; 6	1; 6
2	(Finland) (Georgia (country))	Emma Laine; Salome Devidze	6; 3	6; 4
3	(Finland) (Georgia (country))	Emma Laine / Essi Laine; Salome Devidze / Tinatin Kavlashvili	3; 6	4; 6

== Latvia vs. Ireland ==
Latvia
0
Marsa, Malta
30 April 2004
Hard (outdoors)

Ireland
3

			1	2	3
1	(Latvia) (Republic of Ireland)	Līga Dekmeijere; Yvonne Doyle	5; 7	4; 6
2	(Latvia) (Republic of Ireland)	Anžela Žguna; Kelly Liggan	3; 6	4; 6
3	(Latvia) (Republic of Ireland)	Irina Kuzmina / Irina Strigalova; Karen Nugent / Elsa O'Riain	6^{3} 7^{7}	3; 6

== See also ==
- Fed Cup structure
