= 2002 Fed Cup Europe/Africa Zone Group II – Pool C =

International tennis competition

Group C of the 2002 Fed Cup Europe/Africa Zone Group II was one of four pools in the Europe/Africa Zone Group II of the 2002 Fed Cup. Three teams competed in a round robin competition, with the team placings determining where they will be positioned within the play-offs.

	(South Africa) RSA	(Latvia) LAT	(Algeria) ALG	(Liechtenstein) LIE	RR; W–L	Set; W–L	Game; W–L	Standings
South Africa		2–1	3–0	3–0	3–0	16–3	111–51	1
Latvia	1–2		2–1	3–0	2–1	12–6	90–71	2
Algeria	0–3	1–2		3–0	1–2	9–10	83–89	3
Liechtenstein	0–3	0–3	0–3		0–3	0–18	35–108	4

== South Africa vs. Liechtenstein ==
South Africa
3
Pretoria, South Africa
9 April 2002
Hard (outdoors)

Liechtenstein
0

			1	2	3
1	(South Africa) (Liechtenstein)	Nicole Rencken; Jeannine Niedhardt	6; 2	6; 1
2	(South Africa) (Liechtenstein)	Natalie Grandin; Sabrina Vogt	6; 0	6; 0
3	(South Africa) (Liechtenstein)	Esmé de Villiers / Chanelle Scheepers; Nadine Batliner / Angelika Schädler	6; 0	6; 2

== Latvia vs. Algeria ==
Latvia
2
Pretoria, South Africa
9 April 2002
Hard (outdoors)

Algeria
1

			1	2	3
1	(Latvia) (Algeria)	Anete Banderę; Sana Ben Salah	6; 2	6; 3
2	(Latvia) (Algeria)	Katrina Banderę; Feriel Esseghir	6; 1	6; 4
3	(Latvia) (Algeria)	Katrina Banderę / Ilona Giberte; Sihem Ben Youcef / Feriel Esseghir	2; 6	6^{3} 7^{7}

== South Africa vs. Latvia ==
South Africa
2
Pretoria, South Africa
10 April 2002
Hard (outdoors)

Latvia
1

			1	2	3
1	(South Africa) (Latvia)	Chanelle Scheepers; Anete Banderę	6; 2	6; 1
2	(South Africa) (Latvia)	Natalie Grandin; Katrina Banderę	4; 6	4; 6
3	(South Africa) (Latvia)	Esmé de Villiers / Natalie Grandin; Anete Banderę / Katrina Banderę	7; 5	6; 2

== Algeria vs. Liechtenstein ==
Algeria
3
Pretoria, South Africa
10 April 2002
Hard (outdoors)

Liechtenstein
0

			1	2	3
1	(Algeria) (Liechtenstein)	Sana Ben Salah; Jeannine Niedhardt	6; 4	6; 1
2	(Algeria) (Liechtenstein)	Feriel Esseghir; Sabrina Vogt	6; 2	6; 1
3	(Algeria) (Liechtenstein)	Feriel Esseghir / Saida Hared; Nadine Batliner / Angelika Schädler	6; 4	6; 3

== South Africa vs. Algeria ==
South Africa
3
Pretoria, South Africa
11 April 2002
Hard (outdoors)

Algeria
0

			1	2	3
1	(South Africa) (Algeria)	Chanelle Scheepers; Sana Ben Salah	6; 2	6; 4
2	(South Africa) (Algeria)	Nicole Rencken; Feriel Esseghir	6; 4	6^{0} 7^{7}	6; 3
3	(South Africa) (Algeria)	Esmé de Villiers / Natalie Grandin; Sihem Ben Youcef / Feriel Esseghir	6; 2	6; 2

== Latvia vs. Liechtenstein ==
Latvia
3
Pretoria, South Africa
11 April 2002
Hard (outdoors)

Liechtenstein
0

			1	2	3
1	(Latvia) (Liechtenstein)	Ilona Giberte; Jeannine Niedhardt	6; 4	6; 1
2	(Latvia) (Liechtenstein)	Katrina Banderę; Sabrina Vogt	6; 2	6; 1
3	(Latvia) (Liechtenstein)	Anete Banderę / Ilona Giberte; Nadine Batliner / Angelika Schädler	6; 4	6; 3

== See also ==
- Fed Cup structure
