= 1999 Dreamland Egypt Classic – Singles =

Singles
- 1999 Dreamland Egypt Classic

Final
- Champion: (Spain) Arantxa Sánchez Vicario
- Runner-up: (Romania) Irina Spîrlea
- Score: 6–1, 6–0

Events
Singles	Doubles
← 1998 ·	Dreamland Egypt Classic	· 2000 →

The 1999 Dreamland Egypt Classic singles was the singles event of the only edition of the Dreamland Egypt Classic; a WTA Tier III tournament and then the most prestigious women's tennis tournament held in Africa. Arantxa Sánchez Vicario won it, defeating Irina Spîrlea, 6–1, 6–0, in the final.

== Seeds ==
The top two seeds received a bye to the second round.

1. (Spain) Arantxa Sánchez Vicario (champion)
2. (France) Mary Pierce (quarterfinals)
3. (Switzerland) Patty Schnyder (quarterfinals)
4. (Belarus) Natasha Zvereva (first round)
5. (Romania) Irina Spîrlea (final)
6. (Spain) Magüi Serna (first round)
7. (Israel) Anna Smashnova (second round)
8. (Germany) Barbara Rittner (second round)

== Draw ==
=== Key ===
- Q = Qualifier
- WC = Wild card
- LL = Lucky loser
- Alt = Alternate
- SE = Special exempt
- PR = Protected ranking
- ITF = ITF entry
- JE = Junior exempt
- w/o = Walkover
- r = Retired
- d = Defaulted
- SR = Special ranking

=== Finals ===
Semifinals
1	(Spain) Arantxa Sánchez Vicario	7	6
(Switzerland) Emmanuelle Gagliardi	5	0
(Canada) Maureen Drake	3	0
5	(Romania) Irina Spîrlea	6	6

Final
1	(Spain) Arantxa Sánchez Vicario	6	6
5	(Romania) Irina Spîrlea	1	0

=== Top half ===
First round
(Germany) P Begerow	6	6
WC	(Egypt) M El Wany	0	0
(Belgium) S Appelmans	6	6^{10}	0
(France) A Dechaume-Balleret	2	7^{12}	6
WC	(Australia) J Dokić	6	6
6	(Spain) M Serna	1	0
4	(Belarus) N Zvereva	4	3
(Switzerland) E Gagliardi	6	6
Q	(Spain) M Ramón Climent	3	3
(Australia) N Pratt	6	6
(United States) M Shaughnessy	6	6^{4}	2
Q	(Belgium) L Courtois	2	7^{7}	6
Q	(Morocco) B Mouhtassine	6^{7}	6	3
7	(Israel) A Smashnova	7^{9}	4	6

Second round
1	(Spain) A Sánchez Vicario	6	6
(Germany) P Begerow	2	1
(France) A Dechaume-Balleret	4	6	2
WC	(Australia) J Dokić	6	2	6
(Switzerland) E Gagliardi	6	1
(Australia) N Pratt	2	0	r
Q	(Belgium) L Courtois	6	6
7	(Israel) A Smashnova	3	3

Quarterfinals
1	(Spain) A Sánchez Vicario	6	6
WC	(Australia) J Dokić	3	1
(Switzerland) E Gagliardi	6	6
Q	(Belgium) L Courtois	3	2

Semifinals
1	(Spain) A Sánchez Vicario	7	6
(Switzerland) E Gagliardi	5	0

=== Bottom half ===
First round
8	(Germany) B Rittner	6	7
(Czech Republic) A Gerši	2	5
(Italy) T Garbin	4	2
(Canada) M Drake	6	6
LL	(Spain) E Bes Ostariz	2	2
Q	(Spain) Á Montolio	6	6
(Italy) L Golarsa	3	3
3	(Switzerland) P Schnyder	6	6
5	(Romania) I Spîrlea	6	6
(Chinese Taipei) S-t Wang	4	2
(Romania) R Sandu	3	5
(Netherlands) K Boogert	6	7
(Belarus) O Barabanschikova	2	6	3
(Netherlands) S Noorlander	6	2	6

Second round
8	(Germany) B Rittner	4	2
(Canada) M Drake	6	6
Q	(Spain) Á Montolio	4	6	1
3	(Switzerland) P Schnyder	6	2	6
5	(Romania) I Spîrlea	6	1	7^{7}
(Netherlands) K Boogert	4	6	6^{1}
(Netherlands) S Noorlander	3	6	5
2	(France) M Pierce	6	4	7

Quarterfinals
(Canada) M Drake	6^{1}	6	6
3	(Switzerland) P Schnyder	7^{7}	2	2
5	(Romania) I Spîrlea	6	6
2	(France) M Pierce	4	2

Semifinals
(Canada) M Drake	3	0
5	(Romania) I Spîrlea	6	6

== Qualifying ==
=== Seeds ===
1. (Belgium) Laurence Courtois (qualifier)
2. (Spain) Conchita Martínez Granados (second round)
3. (Italy) Flora Perfetti (second round)
4. (Spain) Eva Bes Ostariz (qualifying competition, lucky loser)
5. (Spain) Mariam Ramón Climent (qualifier)
6. (Italy) Maria Paola Zavagli (second round)
7. (Hungary) Katalin Marosi (second round)
8. (Romania) Andreea Vanc (qualifying competition)

=== Qualifiers ===
1. (Belgium) Laurence Courtois
2. (Spain) Mariam Ramón Climent
3. (Spain) Ángeles Montolio
4. (Morocco) Bahia Mouhtassine

=== Lucky losers ===
1. (Spain) Eva Bes Ostariz

== Qualifying draw ==
=== Key ===
- Q = Qualifier
- WC = Wild card
- LL = Lucky loser
- Alt = Alternate
- SE = Special exempt
- PR = Protected ranking
- ITF = ITF entry
- JE = Junior exempt
- w/o = Walkover
- r = Retired
- d = Defaulted
- SR = Special ranking

=== First qualifier ===
First round
1	(Belgium) Laurence Courtois	3	7	6
(Bulgaria) Svetlana Krivencheva	6	5	2
(Slovenia) Tina Pisnik	6	6
WC	(Egypt) Sara Abaza	0	1
(Romania) Mira Radu	6	6
(Japan) Riei Otakeyama	2	4
(Czech Republic) Hana Šromová	5	4
8	(Romania) Andreea Vanc	7	6

Second round
1	(Belgium) Laurence Courtois	6	1	7
(Slovenia) Tina Pisnik	1	6	5
(Romania) Mira Radu	2	3
8	(Romania) Andreea Vanc	6	6

Qualifying competition
1	(Belgium) Laurence Courtois	3	6	6
8	(Romania) Andreea Vanc	6	0	2

=== Second qualifier ===
First round
3	(Italy) Flora Perfetti	3	6	6
(Israel) Tzipora Obziler	6	3	1
(Germany) Fruzsina Siklosi	5	6^{8}
(Germany) Angelika Bachmann	7	7^{10}
(Russia) Anastasia Myskina	5	6	6^{1}
(Israel) Nataly Cahana	7	0	7^{7}
(Russia) Maria Goloviznina	3	6^{8}
5	(Spain) Mariam Ramón Climent	6	7^{10}

Second round
3	(Italy) Flora Perfetti	2	6	6^{2}
(Germany) Angelika Bachmann	6	4	7^{7}
(Israel) Nataly Cahana	1	1
5	(Spain) Mariam Ramón Climent	6	6

Qualifying competition
(Germany) Angelika Bachmann	6	6^{5}	1
8	(Spain) Mariam Ramón Climent	4	7^{7}	6

=== Third qualifier ===
First round
7	(Hungary) Katalin Marosi	6	6
(Argentina) Celeste Contín	2	1
(Spain) Ángeles Montolio	6	6
(France) Caroline Dhenin	2	0
WC	(Egypt) Dalia El Sheikh	0	0
(Tunisia) Selima Sfar	6	6
(Argentina) María Fernanda Landa	1	2
4	(Spain) Eva Bes Ostariz	6	6

Second round
7	(Hungary) Katalin Marosi	7^{7}	4	4
(Spain) Ángeles Montolio	6^{1}	6	6
(Tunisia) Selima Sfar	4	6	3
4	(Spain) Eva Bes Ostariz	6	2	6

Qualifying competition
(Spain) Ángeles Montolio	6	6
4	(Spain) Eva Bes Ostariz	3	4

=== Fourth qualifier ===
First round
6	(Italy) Maria Paola Zavagli	6	4	6
(Czech Republic) Milena Nekvapilová	3	6	0
(Morocco) Bahia Mouhtassine	6	6
(Czech Republic) Ludmila Varmužová	2	4
Alt	(Germany) Lydia Steinbach	0	6	3
(Germany) Camilla Kremer	6	4	6
WC	(Egypt) Yomna Farid	1	0
2	(Spain) Conchita Martínez Granados	6	6

Second round
6	(Italy) Maria Paola Zavagli	1	3
(Morocco) Bahia Mouhtassine	6	6
(Germany) Camilla Kremer	6	7
2	(Spain) Conchita Martínez Granados	2	5

Qualifying competition
(Morocco) Bahia Mouhtassine	6	2	6
(Germany) Camilla Kremer	3	6	2
