= 2002 Fed Cup Europe/Africa Zone Group I – Pool B =

Pool in women's tennis competition

Group B of the 2002 Fed Cup Europe/Africa Zone Group I was one of four pools in the Europe/Africa Zone Group I of the 2002 Fed Cup. Four teams competed in a round robin competition, with the top two teams advancing to the play-offs and the bottom team being relegated down to Group II for 2003.

	(Israel) ISR	(Netherlands) NED	(Romania) ROU	(Bosnia and Herzegovina) BIH	RR; W–L	Set; W–L	Game; W–L	Standings
Israel		2–1	2–1	3–0	3–0	14–4	91–52	1
Netherlands	1–2		2–1	3–0	2–1	12–8	97–72	2
Romania	1–2	1–2		3–0	1–2	11–8	88–81	3
Bosnia and Herzegovina	0–3	0–3	2–1		0–3	1–18	42–113	4

== Israel vs. Romania ==
Israel
2
Antalya, Turkey
24 April 2002
Red clay (outdoors)

Romania
1

			1	2	3
1	(Israel) (Romania)	Tzipora Obziler; Liana Ungur	6; 4	6; 1
2	(Israel) (Romania)	Anna Smashnova; Magda Mihalache	6; 0	6; 3
3	(Israel) (Romania)	Shahar Pe'er / Hila Rosen; Liana Ungur / Magda Mihalache	1; 6	2; 6

== Netherlands vs. Bosnia and Herzegovina ==
Netherlands
3
Antalya, Turkey
24 April 2002
Red clay (outdoors)

Bosnia and Herzegovina
0

			1	2	3
1	(Netherlands) (Bosnia and Herzegovina)	Amanda Hopmans; Sandra Martinović	6; 0	6; 1
2	(Netherlands) (Bosnia and Herzegovina)	Miriam Oremans; Mervana Jugić-Salkić	3; 6	6; 1	6; 1
3	(Netherlands) (Bosnia and Herzegovina)	Kristie Boogert / Seda Noorlander; Helena Bešović / Maja Mešanović	6; 1	6; 4

== Israel vs. Bosnia and Herzegovina ==
Israel
3
Antalya, Turkey
25 April 2002
Red clay (outdoors)

Bosnia and Herzegovina
0

			1	2	3
1	(Israel) (Bosnia and Herzegovina)	Tzipora Obziler; Sandra Martinović	6; 2	6; 0
2	(Israel) (Bosnia and Herzegovina)	Anna Smashnova; Mervana Jugić-Salkić	7^{7} 6^{5}	6; 2
3	(Israel) (Bosnia and Herzegovina)	Tzipora Obziler / Hila Rosen; Helena Bešović / Maja Mešanović	6; 0	6; 1

== Netherlands vs. Romania ==
Netherlands
2
Antalya, Turkey
25 April 2002
Red clay (outdoors)

Romania
1

			1	2	3
1	(Netherlands) (Romania)	Seda Noorlander; Liana Ungur	3; 6	7^{7} 6^{4}	6; 1
2	(Netherlands) (Romania)	Miriam Oremans; Magda Mihalache	6^{4} 7^{7}	3; 6
3	(Netherlands) (Romania)	Kristie Boogert / Miriam Oremans; Liana Ungur / Magda Mihalache	6; 1	6; 4

== Israel vs. Netherlands ==
Israel
2
Antalya, Turkey
26 April 2002
Red clay (outdoors)

Netherlands
1

			1	2	3
1	(Israel) (Netherlands)	Tzipora Obziler; Kristie Boogert	6; 2	6; 3
2	(Israel) (Netherlands)	Anna Smashnova; Miriam Oremans	6; 2	6; 2
3	(Israel) (Netherlands)	Tzipora Obziler / Hila Rosen; Amanda Hopmans / Seda Noorlander	2; 6	1; 6

== Romania vs. Bosnia and Herzegovina ==
Romania
3
Antalya, Turkey
26 April 2002
Red clay (outdoors)

Bosnia and Herzegovina
0

			1	2	3
1	(Romania) (Bosnia and Herzegovina)	Liana Ungur; Sandra Martinović	6; 1	6; 3
2	(Romania) (Bosnia and Herzegovina)	Magda Mihalache; Mervana Jugić-Salkić	6; 3	6; 3
3	(Romania) (Bosnia and Herzegovina)	Raluca Ciochină / Magda Mihalache; Helena Bešović / Maja Mešanović	6; 2	7; 5

- Bosnia and Herzegovina failed to win any ties in the pool, and thus was relegated to Group II in 2003, where they placed third in their group of four.

== See also ==
- Fed Cup structure
