= 2002 Fed Cup Europe/Africa Zone Group I – Pool A =

International tennis competition

Group A of the 2002 Fed Cup Europe/Africa Zone Group I was one of four pools in the Europe/Africa Zone Group I of the 2002 Fed Cup. Four teams competed in a round robin competition, with the top two teams advancing to the play-offs and the bottom team being relegated down to Group II for 2003.

	(Slovenia) SLO	(Ukraine) UKR	(Belarus) BLR	(Greece) GRE	RR; W–L	Set; W–L	Game; W–L	Standings
Slovenia		3–0	2–1	2–1	3–0	16–5	109–63	1
Ukraine	0–3		1–2	3–0	1–2	9–12	87–113	2
Belarus	1–2	2–1		1–2	1–2	9–12	86–99	3
Greece	1–2	0–3	2–1		1–2	8–13	83–100	4

== Slovenia vs. Ukraine ==
Slovenia
3
Antalya, Turkey
24 April 2002
Red clay (outdoors)

Ukraine
0

			1	2	3
1	(Slovenia) (Ukraine)	Maja Matevžič; Alona Bondarenko	6; 0	6; 1
2	(Slovenia) (Ukraine)	Tina Pisnik; Yuliya Beygelzimer	6; 2	6; 3
3	(Slovenia) (Ukraine)	Tina Križan / Tina Pisnik; Yuliya Beygelzimer / Alona Bondarenko	6; 2	6; 3

== Belarus vs. Greece ==
Belarus
1
Antalya, Turkey
24 April 2002
Red clay (outdoors)

Greece
2

			1	2	3
1	(Belarus) (Greece)	Olga Barabanschikova; Maria Pavlidou	6; 4	6; 1
2	(Belarus) (Greece)	Tatiana Poutchek; Eleni Daniilidou	3; 6	2; 6
3	(Belarus) (Greece)	Olga Barabanschikova / Natasha Zvereva; Eleni Daniilidou / Christina Zachariadou	2; 6	2; 6

== Slovenia vs. Greece ==
Slovenia
2
Antalya, Turkey
25 April 2002
Red clay (outdoors)

Greece
1

			1	2	3
1	(Slovenia) (Greece)	Maja Matevžič; Maria Pavlidou	6; 1	6; 2
2	(Slovenia) (Greece)	Tina Pisnik; Eleni Daniilidou	6; 4	6; 3
3	(Slovenia) (Greece)	Tina Križan / Tina Pisnik; Eleni Daniilidou / Christina Zachariadou	6; 1	4; 6	2; 6

== Ukraine vs. Belarus ==
Ukraine
1
Antalya, Turkey
25 April 2002
Red clay (outdoors)

Belarus
2

			1	2	3
1	(Ukraine) (Belarus)	Alona Bondarenko; Nadejda Ostrovskaya	6; 3	6; 3
2	(Ukraine) (Belarus)	Yuliya Beygelzimer; Tatiana Poutchek	6^{2} 7^{7}	1; 6
3	(Ukraine) (Belarus)	Yuliya Beygelzimer / Alona Bondarenko; Olga Barabanschikova / Nadejda Ostrovskaya	6; 3	2; 6	6; 8

== Slovenia vs. Belarus ==
Slovenia
2
Antalya, Turkey
26 April 2002
Red clay (outdoors)

Belarus
1

			1	2	3
1	(Slovenia) (Belarus)	Maja Matevžič; Olga Barabanschikova	6; 3	6; 3
2	(Slovenia) (Belarus)	Tina Pisnik; Nadejda Ostrovskaya	2; 2	6; 3	6
3	(Slovenia) (Belarus)	Ajda Brumen / Tina Križan; Tatiana Poutchek / Natasha Zvereva	6; 2	6; 3

== Ukraine vs. Greece ==
Ukraine
3
Antalya, Turkey
26 April 2002
Red clay (outdoors)

Greece
0

			1	2	3
1	(Ukraine) (Greece)	Alona Bondarenko; Maria Pavlidou	3; 6	6; 3	6; 3
2	(Ukraine) (Greece)	Yuliya Beygelzimer; Eleni Daniilidou	6; 1	3; 6	7; 5
3	(Ukraine) (Greece)	Yuliya Beygelzimer / Alona Bondarenko; Eleni Daniilidou / Christina Zachariadou	6; 3	6; 4

- Greece failed to win any ties in the pool, and thus was relegated to Group II in 2003, where they achieved promotion back to Group I for 2004.

== See also ==
- Fed Cup structure
