= 2002 Fed Cup Europe/Africa Zone Group II – Pool B =

International tennis competition

Group B of the 2002 Fed Cup Europe/Africa Zone Group II was one of four pools in the Europe/Africa Zone Group II of the 2002 Fed Cup. Three teams competed in a round robin competition, with the team placings determining where they will be positioned within the play-offs.

	(Denmark) DEN	(Lithuania) LIT	(Tunisia) TUN	RR; W–L	Set; W–L	Game; W–L	Standings
Denmark		3–0	3–0	2–0	12–1	77–23	1
Lithuania	0–3		3–0	1–1	7–6	57–42	2
Tunisia	0–3	0–3		0–2	0–12	3–72	3

== Denmark vs. Tunisia ==
Denmark
3
Pretoria, South Africa
9 April 2002
Hard (outdoors)

Tunisia
0

			1	2	3
1	(Denmark) (Tunisia)	Karina-Ildor Jacobsgaard; Nadia Kilani	6; 0	6; 2
2	(Denmark) (Tunisia)	Eva Dyrberg; Mariem Nissaf Bouchlaka	6; 0	6; 0
3	(Denmark) (Tunisia)	Andrea Munch-Hermansen / Karina-Ildor Jacobsgaard; Imen Ben Larbi / Nadia Kilani	6; 0	6; 0

== Lithuania vs. Tunisia ==
Lithuania
3
Pretoria, South Africa
10 April 2002
Hard (outdoors)

Tunisia
0

			1	2	3
1	(Lithuania) (Tunisia)	Lina Stančiūtė; Nadia Kilani	6; 0	6; 0
2	(Lithuania) (Tunisia)	Edita Liachovičiūtė; Mariem Nissaf Bouchlaka	6; 0	6; 1
3	(Lithuania) (Tunisia)	Edita Liachovičiūtė / Lina Stančiūtė; Imen Ben Larbi / Nadia Kilani	6; 0	6; 0

== Denmark vs. Lithuania ==
Denmark
3
Pretoria, South Africa
11 April 2002
Hard (outdoors)

Lithuania
0

			1	2	3
1	(Denmark) (Lithuania)	Karina-Ildor Jacobsgaard; Lina Stančiūtė	6; 2	6; 1
2	(Denmark) (Lithuania)	Eva Dyrberg; Edita Liachovičiūtė	6; 3	6; 0
3	(Denmark) (Lithuania)	Andrea Munch-Hermansen / Maria Rasmussen; Edita Liachovičiūtė / Lina Stančiūtė	7^{7} 6^{3}	4; 6	6; 3

== See also ==
- Fed Cup structure
