= Feriel Esseghir =

Algerian retired tennis player

- Country (sports): Algeria
- Born: 29 October 1983 (age 41); Algiers
- Retired: 2003
- Plays: Right-handed (two-handed backhand)
- Prize money: $12,226

Singles
- Career record: 37–50
- Highest ranking: 381 (8 April 2002)

Grand Slam singles results
- French Open Junior: 2R (2001)

Doubles
- Career record: 4–11
- Highest ranking: 534 (5 August 2002)

Grand Slam doubles results
- French Open Junior: 2R (2001)

Team competitions
- Fed Cup: 8–17

Feriel Esseghir (born 29 October 1983) is an Algerian retired tennis player.

Esseghir has career-high WTA rankings of 381 in singles and 534 in doubles, both achieved in 2002. In her career, she was not able to win a title on the ITF circuit, and retired from pro tennis in 2003.

Playing for Algeria in Fed Cup, Esseghir has a win/loss record of 8–17.

She made her WTA Tour singles main-draw debut at the 2002 Morocco Open, in the doubles event partnering Meryem El Haddad.

== ITF finals ==
=== Singles (0–1) ===
| Legend $100,000 tournaments $75,000 tournaments $50,000 tournaments $25,000 tournaments $10,000 tournaments | Finals by surface Hard (0–0) Clay (0–1) Grass (0–0) Carpet (0–0) |

| Outcome | Date | Location | Surface | Opponent | Score |
|---|---|---|---|---|---|
| Runner-up | 13 May 2001 | Midlothian, United States | Clay | (South Africa) Jessica Steck | 5–7, 3–6 |

== Fed Cup participation ==
=== Singles ===
| Edition | Date | Location | Against | Surface | Opponent | W/L | Score |
|---|---|---|---|---|---|---|---|
| 1998 Fed Cup; Europe/Africa Zone Group II | 7 May 1998 | Manavgat, Turkey | (Denmark) Denmark | Clay | (Denmark) Charlotte Aagaard | L | 2–6, 7–6^{(5)}, 0–6 |
| 1998 Fed Cup; Europe/Africa Zone Group II | 9 May 1998 | Manavgat, Turkey | Tunisia | Clay | (Tunisia) Issem Essaies | W | 6–1, 6–2 |
| 1999 Fed Cup; Europe/Africa Zone Group II | 27 April 1999 | Murcia, Spain | (Malta) Malta | Clay | (Malta) Carol Cassar-Torreggiani | L | 4–6, 3–6 |
| 1999 Fed Cup; Europe/Africa Zone Group II | 29 April 1999 | Murcia, Spain | Turkey | Clay | (Turkey) Duygu Akşit Oal | L | 4–6, 7–5, 1–6 |
| 2000 Fed Cup; Europe/Africa Zone Group II | 28 March 2000 | Estoril, Portugal | (Madagascar) Madagascar | Clay | (Madagascar) Aina Rafolomanantsiatosika | L | 5–7, 4–6 |
| 2000 Fed Cup; Europe/Africa Zone Group II | 29 March 2000 | Estoril, Portugal | Moldova | Clay | (Moldova) Svetlana Komleva | L | 3–6, 3–6 |
| 2000 Fed Cup; Europe/Africa Zone Group II | 29 March 2000 | Estoril, Portugal | Estonia | Clay | (Estonia) Maret Ani | L | 4–6, 1–6 |
| 2000 Fed Cup; Europe/Africa Zone Group II | 31 March 2000 | Estoril, Portugal | Portugal | Clay | (Portugal) Ana Catarina Nogueira | L | 4–6, 6–3, 2–6 |
| 2002 Fed Cup; Europe/Africa Zone Group II | 9 April 2002 | Pretoria, South Africa | (Latvia) Latvia | Hard | (Latvia) Katrina Banderę | L | 1–6, 4–6 |
| 2002 Fed Cup; Europe/Africa Zone Group II | 10 April 2002 | Pretoria, South Africa | Liechtenstein | Hard | (Liechtenstein) Sabrina Vogt | W | 6–2, 6–1 |
| 2002 Fed Cup; Europe/Africa Zone Group II | 11 April 2002 | Pretoria, South Africa | South Africa | Hard | (South Africa) Nicole Rencken | L | 4–6, 7–6^{(0)}, 3–6 |
| 2002 Fed Cup; Europe/Africa Zone Group II | 12 April 2002 | Pretoria, South Africa | Norway | Hard | (Norway) Ina Sartz | W | 6–2, 6–4 |
| 2002 Fed Cup; Europe/Africa Zone Group II | 13 April 2002 | Pretoria, South Africa | (Republic of Ireland) Ireland | Hard | (Republic of Ireland) Kelly Liggan | L | 6–7^{(3)}, 1–6 |

=== Doubles ===
| Edition | Date | Location | Against | Surface | Partner | Opponents | W/L | Score |
|---|---|---|---|---|---|---|---|---|
| 1998 Fed Cup; Europe/Africa Zone Group II | 5 May 1998 | Manavgat, Turkey | (Cyprus) Cyprus | Clay | (Algeria) Lamia Hameurlaine | (Cyprus) Daphne Nicolatou (Cyprus) Eleni Pilava Papanikolaou | W | 4–6, 6–1, 6–3 |
| 1998 Fed Cup; Europe/Africa Zone Group II | 6 May 1998 | Manavgat, Turkey | Denmark | Clay | (Algeria) Lamia Hameurlaine | (Denmark) Eva Dyrberg (Denmark) Maria Rasmussen | L | 2–6, 1–6 |
| 1998 Fed Cup; Europe/Africa Zone Group II | 7 May 1998 | Manavgat, Turkey | Lithuania | Clay | (Algeria) Siham-Soumeya Ben Nacer | (Lithuania) Rūta Deduraitė (Lithuania) Edita Liachovičiūtė | L | 4–6, 6–4, 2–6 |
| 1999 Fed Cup; Europe/Africa Zone Group II | 27 April 1999 | Murcia, Spain | (Malta) Malta | Clay | (Algeria) Siham-Soumeya Ben Nacer | (Malta) Lisa Camenzuli (Malta) Carol Cassar-Torreggiani | L | 6–7^{(12)}, 4–6 |
| 1999 Fed Cup; Europe/Africa Zone Group II | 28 April 1999 | Murcia, Spain | (Republic of Ireland) Ireland | Clay | (Algeria) Siham-Soumeya Ben Nacer | (Republic of Ireland) Yvonne Flynn (Republic of Ireland) Karen Nugent | L | 2–6, 2–6 |
| 1999 Fed Cup; Europe/Africa Zone Group II | 29 April 1999 | Murcia, Spain | Turkey | Clay | (Algeria) Siham-Soumeya Ben Nacer | (Turkey) Merve Asımgil (Turkey) Seden Özlü | W | 3–0 ret. |
| 2000 Fed Cup; Europe/Africa Zone Group II | 28 March 2000 | Estoril, Portugal | (Madagascar) Madagascar | Clay | (Algeria) Siham-Soumeya Ben Nacer | (Madagascar) Aina Rafolomanantsiatosika (Madagascar) Solange Rasoarivelo | W | 6–3, 6–2 |
| 2000 Fed Cup; Europe/Africa Zone Group II | 29 March 2000 | Estoril, Portugal | Moldova | Clay | (Algeria) Sihem Ben Youcef | (Moldova) Svetlana Komleva (Moldova) Natalia Volcova | L | 1–6, 6–2, 3–6 |
| 2000 Fed Cup; Europe/Africa Zone Group II | 30 March 2000 | Estoril, Portugal | Estonia | Clay | (Algeria) Sihem Ben Youcef | (Estonia) Maret Ani (Estonia) Liina Suurvarik | L | 3–6, 1–6 |
| 2002 Fed Cup; Europe/Africa Zone Group II | 9 April 2002 | Pretoria, South Africa | (Latvia) Latvia | Hard | (Algeria) Sihem Ben Youcef | (Latvia) Katrina Banderę (Latvia) Ilona Giberte | W | 6–2, 7–6^{(3)} |
| 2002 Fed Cup; Europe/Africa Zone Group II | 10 April 2002 | Pretoria, South Africa | Liechtenstein | Hard | (Algeria) Saida Hared | (Liechtenstein) Nadine Batliner (Liechtenstein) Angelika Schädler | W | 6–4, 6–3 |
| 2002 Fed Cup; Europe/Africa Zone Group II | 11 April 2002 | Pretoria, South Africa | South Africa | Hard | (Algeria) Sihem Ben Youcef | (South Africa) Esmé de Villiers (South Africa) Natalie Grandin | L | 2–6, 2–6 |

== ITF Junior finals ==
Category G1
Category G2
Category G3
Category G4
Category G5

=== Singles (2–4) ===
| Outcome | No. | Date | Location | Surface | Opponent | Score |
|---|---|---|---|---|---|---|
| Winner | 1. | 9 August 1998 | Cairo, Egypt | Clay | (South Africa) Karin Coetzee | 6–0, 6–2 |
| Runner-up | 2. | 21 August 1998 | Giza, Egypt | Clay | (Federal Republic of Yugoslavia) Dina Milošević | 5–7, 6–2, 2–6 |
| Winner | 3. | 29 August 1998 | Damascus, Syria | Clay | (Algeria) Siham-Soumeya Ben Nacer | 6–3, 6–4 |
| Runner-up | 4. | 6 September 1998 | Beirut, Lebanon | Clay | (Armenia) Marie-Gaïané Mikaelian | 1–6, 5–7 |
| Runner-up | 5. | 17 March 2000 | Algiers, Algeria | Clay | (France) Marion Bartoli | 2–6, 1–6 |
| Runner-up | 6. | 22 April 2000 | Pretoria, South Africa | Hard | (South Africa) Aniela Mojzis | 6–2, 3–6, 4–6 |

=== Doubles (8–2) ===
| Outcome | No. | Date | Location | Surface | Partner | Opponents | Score |
|---|---|---|---|---|---|---|---|
| Winner | 1. | 5 April 1997 | Sainte-Marie, Martinique | Hard | (France) Audrey Legay | (France) Beatrice Burlet (Haiti) Neyssa Etienne | 3–6, 6–1, 6–2 |
| Winner | 2. | 10 August 1997 | Giza, Egypt | Clay | (Algeria) Sihem Ben Youcef | (Morocco) Meriem Addou (Morocco) Meryem El Haddad | 6–2, 6–7, 6–4 |
| Winner | 3. | 21 August 1998 | Giza, Egypt | Clay | (Algeria) Siham-Soumeya Ben Nacer | (Egypt) Yomna Farid (Egypt) Dina Khalil | 7–5, 6–2 |
| Winner | 4. | 29 August 1998 | Damascus, Syria | Clay | (Algeria) Siham-Soumeya Ben Nacer | (Egypt) May Kabani (Egypt) Dina Khalil | 6–3, 6–2 |
| Winner | 5. | 6 September 1998 | Beirut, Lebanon | Clay | (Algeria) Siham-Soumeya Ben Nacer | (Germany) Stephanie Balzert (Germany) Tanja Hırschauer | 7–5, 6–3 |
| Winner | 6. | 17 March 2000 | Algiers, Algeria | Clay | (Algeria) Siham-Soumeya Ben Nacer | (Algeria) Sana Ben Salah (Algeria) Djamila Khaldi | 6–7, 6–2, 6–0 |
| Winner | 7. | 19 August 2000 | Haverford, United States | Grass | (South Africa) Aniela Mojzis | (United States) Megan Bradley (United States) Danielle Schwartz | 6–4, 6–2 |
| Runner-up | 8. | 27 August 2000 | New Jersey, United States | Hard | (United States) Stephanie Ginsburg | (United States) Erin Burdette (United States) Tanner Cochran | 3–6, 0–6 |
| Runner-up | 9. | 11 March 2001 | Lambaré, Paraguay | Hard | (Canada) Beier Ko | (Czech Republic) Eva Hrdinová (Czech Republic) Ema Janašková | 3–6, 4–6 |
| Winner | 10. | 15 April 2001 | Tunis, Tunisia | Clay | (Algeria) Sana Ben Salah | (Egypt) Yomna Farid (Egypt) Amani Khalifa | 3–6, 6–2, 6–3 |
