= Dreamland Egypt Classic =

Defunct tennis tournament
- Event name: Dreamland Egypt Classic
- Tour: WTA Tour
- Founded: 1999
- Abolished: 1999
- Editions: 1
- Location: Cairo, Egypt
- Surface: Clay

The Dreamland Egypt Classic is a defunct WTA Tour affiliated tennis tournament played in 1999. It was held in Cairo in Egypt and played on outdoor clay courts. According to the Al-Ahram newspaper, Dreamland Egypt Classic was the first WTA tournament ever held in Middle East.

== Past finals ==
=== Singles ===
Year	Champions	Runners-up	Score
1999	(Spain) Arantxa Sánchez Vicario	(Romania) Irina Spîrlea	6–1, 6–0

=== Doubles ===
Year	Champions	Runners-up	Score
1999	(Belgium) Laurence Courtois (Spain) Arantxa Sánchez Vicario	(Romania) Irina Spîrlea (Netherlands) Caroline Vis	5–7, 6–2, 7–6
