= Irina Spîrlea =

Romanian tennis player

- Country (sports): Romania
- Residence: Rome, Italy
- Born: 26 March 1974 (age 51) Bucharest, Romania
- Height: 1.75 m (5 ft 9 in)
- Turned pro: 1990
- Retired: 2000
- Plays: Right-handed (one handed-backhand)
- Prize money: US$ 2,652,068

Singles
- Career record: 291–189
- Career titles: 4 WTA, 3 ITF
- Highest ranking: No. 7 (13 October 1997)

Grand Slam singles results
- Australian Open: QF (1997)
- French Open: 4R (1994, 1996, 1997)
- Wimbledon: 4R (1997, 1998)
- US Open: SF (1997)

Other tournaments
- Tour Finals: SF (1997, 1998)

Doubles
- Career record: 200–154
- Career titles: 6 WTA, 5 ITF
- Highest ranking: No. 16 (2 October 1995)

Irina Spîrlea (born 26 March 1974) is a retired tennis player from Romania who turned professional in 1990. She won four singles and six doubles titles. Spîrlea reached her career-high ranking on the WTA Tour on 13 October 1997, when she became No. 7 in the world. She retired in 2000.

== Personal life ==
Spîrlea married Massimiliano Pace, her former coach, in 2001, and has a son, Tommaso, born in 2002, as well as a younger daughter, Francesca.

== Career ==
Irina Spîrlea is one of the more successful tennis players from Romania, being one of only three women to have reached the top 10 (the others being Virginia Ruzici and Simona Halep.) Her best performance at a Grand Slam tournament was a semifinal at the US Open in 1997. She won the WTA Newcomer of the Year award in 1994.

In 1996, Spîrlea became the first player in the history of the Women's Tennis Association to receive a match default for conduct when she swore at an official in Italian during a match played in Palermo, Italy.

Spîrlea was involved in a bumping incident with Venus Williams during a changeover in the semifinals of the 1997 US Open. Spîrlea collided with Williams near the net post while changing ends, and did not move sideways. Spîrlea went on to lose the match 6–7, 6–4, 6–7 in a third-set tiebreak, after holding two match points, at 6–4 and 6–5 in the tie breaker. Williams' father accused Spîrlea of racism, and later called her "an ugly white turkey". Spîrlea accused Williams of arrogance, saying in a press conference following the match, "I'm not going to move. She never tries to turn (...) She thinks she's the fucking Venus Williams." Spîrlea subsequently had to pay $5,000 fine for using an obscenity. At the following Grand Slam tournament, the 1998 Australian Open, Spîrlea was the first opponent of Venus' sister, Serena Williams in the main draw and lost in three sets.

== WTA career finals ==
=== Singles: 10 (4 titles, 6 runner-ups) ===
Legend Grand Slam tournaments (0–0) Tier I (0–2) Tier II (1–0) Tier III, IV & V (3–4)	Titles by surface Hard (0–2) Grass (0–0) Clay (4–3) Carpet (0–1)

Result	W/L	Date	Tournament	Surface	Opponent	Score
Loss	0–1	Sep 1993	Sapporo, Japan	Carpet (i)	(United States) Linda Wild	4–6, 3–6
Loss	0–2	Apr 1994	Taranto Trophy, Italy	Clay	(France) Julie Halard-Decugis	2–6, 3–6
Win	1–2	Jul 1994	Palermo International, Italy	Clay	(Netherlands) Brenda Schultz-McCarthy	6–4, 1–6, 7–6^{(7–5)}
Loss	1–3	Jan 1995	Jakarta Open, Indonesia	Hard	(Germany) Sabine Hack	6–2, 6–7^{(6–8)}, 4–6
Win	2–3	Jul 1995	Palermo International, Italy	Clay	(Germany) Sabine Hack	7–6^{(7–1)}, 6–2
Win	3–3	Apr 1996	Amelia Island Championships, U.S.	Clay	(France) Mary Pierce	6–7^{(7–9)}, 6–4, 6–3
Loss	3–4	Mar 1997	Indian Wells Masters, U.S.	Hard	(United States) Lindsay Davenport	2–6, 1–6
Loss	3–5	Mar 1998	Family Circle Cup, U.S.	Clay	(South Africa) Amanda Coetzer	3–6, 4–6
Win	4–5	May 1998	Internationaux de Strasbourg, France	Clay	(France) Julie Halard-Decugis	7–6^{(7–5)}, 6–3
Loss	4–6	Apr 1999	Egypt Classic	Clay	(Spain) Arantxa Sánchez Vicario	1–6, 0–6

=== Doubles: 13 (6 titles, 7 runner-ups) ===
Legend Grand Slam tournaments (0–0) Tier I (1–1) Tier II (2–2) Tier III, IV & V (3–4)	Titles by surface' Hard (1–1) Grass (0–0) Clay (2–3) Carpet (3–3)

Result	W/L	Date	Tournament	Surface	Partner	Opponents	Score
Win	1–0	Apr 1994	Taranto Trophy, Italy	Clay	(France) Noëlle van Lottum	(Italy) Sandra Cecchini (France) Isabelle Demongeot	6–3, 2–6, 6–1
Win	2–0	Jan 1995	Jakarta Open, Indonesia	Hard	(Germany) Claudia Porwik	(Belgium) Laurence Courtois (Belgium) Nancy Feber	6–2, 6–3
Loss	2–1	Apr 1995	Bol Ladies Open, Croatia	Clay	(Italy) Laura Golarsa	(Argentina) Mercedes Paz (Canada) Rene Simpson	5–7, 2–6
Loss	2–2	Jan 1996	Pan Pacific Open, Japan	Carpet (i)	(South Africa) Mariaan de Swardt	(United States) Gigi Fernández (Belarus) Natasha Zvereva	6–7^{(7–9)}, 3–6
Win	3–2	May 1996	Italian Open	Clay	(Spain) Arantxa Sánchez Vicario	(United States) Gigi Fernández (Switzerland) Martina Hingis	6–4, 3–6, 6–3
Loss	3–3	Nov 1996	Bank of the West Classic, U.S.	Carpet (i)	(France) Nathalie Tauziat	(United States) Lindsay Davenport (United States) Mary Joe Fernández	1–6, 3–6
Loss	3–4	May 1997	Madrid Open, Spain	Clay	(Argentina) Inés Gorrochategui	(United States) Mary Joe Fernández (Spain) Arantxa Sánchez Vicario	3–6, 2–6
Loss	3–5	Nov 1998	Sparkassen Cup Leipzig, Germany	Carpet (i)	(Netherlands) Manon Bollegraf	(Russia) Elena Likhovtseva (Japan) Ai Sugiyama	3–6, 7–6^{(7–2)}, 1–6
Loss	3–6	Jan 1999	Brisbane International, Australia	Hard	(Australia) Kristine Kunce	(Romania) Corina Morariu (Latvia) Larisa Neiland	3–6, 3–6
Win	4–6	Feb 1999	Paris Indoor, France	Carpet (i)	(Netherlands) Caroline Vis	(Russia) Elena Likhovtseva (Japan) Ai Sugiyama	7–5, 3–6, 6–3
Loss	4–7	Apr 1999	Egypt Classic	Clay	(Netherlands) Caroline Vis	(Belgium) Laurence Courtois (Spain) Arantxa Sánchez Vicario	7–5, 1–6, 6–7^{(7–9)}
Win	5–7	Sep 1999	Luxembourg Open	Carpet (i)	(Netherlands) Caroline Vis	(Slovenia) Tina Križan (Slovenia) Katarina Srebotnik	6–1, 6–2
Win	6–7	Oct 1999	Generali Ladies Linz, Austria	Carpet (i)	(Netherlands) Caroline Vis	(Slovenia) Tina Križan (Latvia) Larisa Neiland	6–4, 6–3

== ITF Circuit finals ==
Legend
$100,000 tournaments
$75,000 tournaments
$50,000 tournaments
$25,000 tournaments
$10,000 tournaments

=== Singles (3–1) ===
Result	No.	Date	Tournament	Surface	Opponent	Score
Loss	1.	24 September 1990	Mali Lošinj, Yugoslavia	Clay	(Romania) Ruxandra Dragomir	3–6, 1–6
Win	2.	3 June 1991	Milan, Italy	Clay	(France) Agnès Zugasti	6–4, 7–5
Win	3.	3 February 1992	Jakarta, Indonesia	Clay	(Belgium) Ann Devries	6–3, 6–2
Win	4.	14 June 1993	Brindisi, Italy	Clay	(Netherlands) Petra Kamstra	6–1, 5–7, 6–3

=== Doubles (5–8) ===
Result	No.	Date	Tournament	Surface	Partner	Opponents	Score
Loss	1.	13 August 1990	Rebecq, Belgium	Clay	(Romania) Ruxandra Dragomir	(Belgium) Els Callens (Belgium) Caroline Wuillot	4–6, 2–6
Win	2.	20 August 1990	Koksijde, Belgium	Clay	(Romania) Ruxandra Dragomir	(South Africa) Erda Crous (Czechoslovakia) Lucie Ludvigová	6–1, 2–6, 6–3
Win	3.	17 September 1990	Rabac, Yugoslavia	Clay	(Romania) Ruxandra Dragomir	(Czechoslovakia) Katarína Studeníková (Czechoslovakia) Gabriela Vesela	1–6, 6–3, 6–4
Loss	4.	24 September 1990	Mali Lošinj, Yugoslavia	Clay	(Soviet Union) Anna Mirza	(Czechoslovakia) Eva Martincová (Czechoslovakia) Zdeňka Málková	1–6, 1–6
Win	5.	8 October 1990	Bol, Croatia	Clay	(Poland) Magdalena Feistel	(Czechoslovakia) Eva Martincová (Czechoslovakia) Zdeňka Málková	4–6, 6–3, 6–1
Loss	6.	29 May 1991	Brindisi, Italy	Clay	(Czechoslovakia) Katarína Studeníková	(Uruguay) Patricia Miller (Argentina) Inés Gorrochategui	1–6, 6–7
Loss	7.	29 July 1991	Rheda-Wiedenbrück, Germany	Clay	(Germany) Meike Babel	(Sweden) Catarina Bernstein (Sweden) Annika Narbe	4–6, 5–7
Loss	8.	12 August 1991	Pisticci, Italy	Hard	(Romania) Ruxandra Dragomir	(Australia) Justine Hodder (Croatia) Maja Murić	4–6, 6–3, 3–6
Loss	9.	3 February 1992	Jakarta, Indonesia	Clay	(Romania) Ruxandra Dragomir	(Australia) Nicole Pratt (Australia) Angie Woolcock	1–6, 0–6
Win	10.	28 September 1992	Santa Maria Capua Vetere, Italy	Clay	(Belgium) Ann Devries	(Italy) Ginevra Mugnaini (Romania) Andreea Ehritt-Vanc	6–0, 6–0
Loss	11.	22 November 1992	Nottingham, United Kingdom	Carpet (i)	(Romania) Ruxandra Dragomir	(Belgium) Els Callens (Bulgaria) Elena Pampoulova	6–7^{(3–7)}, 4–6
Win	12.	30 November 1992	Le Havre, France	Clay	(Romania) Ruxandra Dragomir	(Germany) Angela Kerek (Germany) Sabine Lohmann	6–3, 7–6
Loss	13.	14 June 1993	Brindisi, Italy	Clay	(Germany) Angela Kerek	(Netherlands) Lara Bitter (Netherlands) Petra Kamstra	5–7, 6–4, 2–6

== Singles performance timeline ==
Key
W	F	SF	QF	#R	RR	Q#	DNQ	A	NH

(W) winner; (F) finalist; (SF) semifinalist; (QF) quarterfinalist; (#R) rounds 4, 3, 2, 1; (RR) round-robin stage; (Q#) qualification round; (DNQ) did not qualify; (A) absent; (NH) not held; (SR) strike rate (events won / competed); (W–L) win–loss record.

Tournament	1990	1991	1992	1993	1994	1995	1996	1997	1998	1999	2000	SR	W–L	W%
Grand Slam tournaments
Australian Open	A	A	A	A	1R	4R	2R	QF	1R	1R	1R	0 / 7	8–7	53%
French Open	A	A	1R	A	4R	3R	4R	4R	1R	3R	1R	0 / 8	13–8	62%
Wimbledon	A	A	A	A	2R	3R	2R	4R	4R	1R	1R	0 / 7	10–7	59%
US Open	A	A	Q1	A	1R	1R	3R	SF	4R	3R	A	0 / 6	12–6	67%
Win–loss	0–0	0–0	0–1	0–0	4–4	7–4	7–4	15–4	6–4	4–4	0–3	0 / 28	43–28	61%
Year-end championships
Tour Championships	A	A	A	A	A	A	1R	SF	SF	A	A	0 / 3	4–3	57%
Tier I tournaments
Tokyo	Tier II			A	A	A	2R	2R	QF	A	A	0 / 3	4–3	57%
Chicago	A	Tier II							Not Held			0 / 0	0–0	0%
Boca Raton	Tier II	A	A	Tier II			Not Held					0 / 1	0–1	0%
Indian Wells	Tier II							F	3R	2R	2R	0 / 5	8–5	62%
Miami	A	A	A	A	1R	2R	QF	QF	2R	2R	2R	0 / 7	8–7	53%
Charleston	A	A	A	A	1R	3R	QF	3R	F	2R	A	0 / 6	11–6	65%
Berlin	A	A	A	A	A	SF	A	3R	QF	1R	1F	0 / 5	7–5	58%
Rome	A	A	Q1	A	SF	3R	SF	QF	3R	3R	1R	0 / 8	15–8	65%
Montreal / Toronto	A	A	A	A	A	A	1R	1R	3R	1R	A	0 / 4	1–4	20%
Moscow	Tier V		Not Held		Tier III			QF	1R	A	A	0 / 2	1–2	33%
Zürich	Tier II			A	A	1R	2R	2R	SF	2R	A	0 / 5	6–5	55%
Philadelphia	NH	Tier II		A	A	QF	Tier II					0 / 4	5–4	56%
Career statistics
Year-end ranking	310	208	164	63	43	21	10	8	15	35	167			

== Record against other top players ==
Spîrlea's win–loss record against certain players who have been ranked world No. 10 or higher is as follows:

Players who have been ranked world No. 1 are in boldface.

- Dominique Monami 6–3
- **Arantxa Sánchez Vicario** 5–5
- Mary Joe Fernández 4–0
- Karina Habšudová 4–1
- Amanda Coetzer 4–4
- Julie Halard-Decugis 3–2
- Ai Sugiyama 3–2
- Mary Pierce 3–5
- **Monica Seles** 3–5
- Barbara Schett 2–0
- Brenda Schultz-McCarthy 2–0
- Anna Kournikova 2–1
- Sandrine Testud 2–1
- Gabriela Sabatini 2–2
- Chanda Rubin 2–3
- Natasha Zvereva 2–5
- Lori McNeil 1–0
- Paola Suárez 1–0
- Andrea Temesvári 1–0
- Nathalie Tauziat 1–2
- **Serena Williams** 1–3
- **Venus Williams** 1–3
- Conchita Martínez 1–4
- Barbara Paulus 1–4
- **Lindsay Davenport** 1–6
- Anke Huber 1–7
- Kimiko Date 0–1
- Zina Garrison 0–1
- **Martina Navratilova** 0–1
- Patty Schnyder 0–1
- **Jennifer Capriati** 0–2
- **Steffi Graf** 0–2
- Iva Majoli 0–3
- **Martina Hingis** 0–6
- Jana Novotná 0–6

Preceded by Iva Majoli	WTA Newcomer of the Year; 1994	Succeeded by Martina Hingis
