= 2002 Fed Cup Europe/Africa Zone Group II – Pool A =

Group A of the 2002 Fed Cup Europe/Africa Zone Group II

Group A of the 2002 Fed Cup Europe/Africa Zone Group II was one of four pools in the Europe/Africa Zone Group II of the 2002 Fed Cup. Three teams competed in a round robin competition, with the team placings determining where they will be positioned within the play-offs.

	(United Kingdom) GBR	(Norway) NOR	(Malta) MLT	RR; W–L	Set; W–L	Game; W–L	Standings
Great Britain		3–0	3–0	2–0	12–0	72–10	1
Norway	0–3		2–1	1–1	4–10	41–74	2
Malta	0–3	1–2		0–2	4–10	44–73	3

== Great Britain vs. Malta ==
Great Britain
3
Pretoria, South Africa
9 April 2002
Hard (outdoors)

Malta
0

			1	2	3
1	(United Kingdom) (Malta)	Rachel Viollet; Sarah Wetz	6; 0	6; 2
2	(United Kingdom) (Malta)	Lucie Ahl; Rosanne Dimech	6; 1	6; 2
3	(United Kingdom) (Malta)	Elena Baltacha / Julie Pullin; Rosanne Dimech / Sarah Wetz	6; 0	6; 1

== Norway vs. Malta ==
Norway
2
Pretoria, South Africa
10 April 2002
Hard (outdoors)

Malta
1

			1	2	3
1	(Norway) (Malta)	Annette Aksdal; Sarah Wetz	4; 6	3; 6
2	(Norway) (Malta)	Ina Sartz; Rosanne Dimech	6; 3	3; 6	6; 2
3	(Norway) (Malta)	Annette Aksdal / Ina Sartz; Helen Asciak / Rosanne Dimech	6; 4	2; 6	7; 5

== Great Britain vs. Norway ==
Great Britain
3
Pretoria, South Africa
11 April 2002
Hard (outdoors)

Norway
0

			1	2	3
1	(United Kingdom) (Norway)	Elena Baltacha; Annette Aksdal	6; 0	6; 1
2	(United Kingdom) (Norway)	Julie Pullin; Ina Sartz	6; 3	6; 0
3	(United Kingdom) (Norway)	Lucie Ahl / Rachel Viollet; Annette Aksdal / Ina Sartz	6; 0	6; 0

== See also ==
- Fed Cup structure
