= Charlotte Aagaard =

Danish tennis player

- Country (sports): Denmark
- Born: 1 December 1977 (age 47)
- Prize money: $19,714

Singles
- Highest ranking: No. 389 (26 October 1998)

Doubles
- Career titles: 6 ITF
- Highest ranking: No. 320 (21 September 1998)

Team competitions
- Fed Cup: 14–7

Charlotte Aagaard (born 1 December 1977) is a Danish former professional tennis player.

Aagaard represented the Denmark Fed Cup team in a total of 16 ties, between 1995 and 2001.

On the professional tour, Aagaard competed in ITF Circuit tournaments, winning six doubles titles.

== ITF finals ==
=== Singles: 5 (0–5) ===
Result	No.	Date	Tournament	Surface	Opponent	Score
Loss	1.	25 September 1995	Antalya, Turkey	Hard	(Germany) Stefanie Meyer	2–6, 0–6
Loss	2.	16 December 1996	Cape Town, South Africa	Hard	(South Africa) Lara van Rooyen	6–7^{(6)}, 0–6
Loss	3.	27 July 1998	Catania, Italy	Clay	(Austria) Sandra Mantler	6–2, 2–6, 4–6
Loss	4.	12 October 1998	Nicosia, Cyprus	Clay	(Hungary) Eszter Molnár	1–6, 4–6
Loss	5.	26 June 2000	Båstad, Sweden	Clay	(Sweden) Maria Wolfbrandt	2–6, 0–6

=== Doubles: 8 (6–2) ===
Result	No.	Date	Tournament	Surface	Partner	Opponents	Score
Win	1.	22 December 1996	Cape Town, South Africa	Hard	(Denmark) Maiken Pape	(South Africa) Natalie Grandin (South Africa) Alicia Pillay	5–7, 6–2, 6–3
Loss	1.	21 April 1997	Biograd, Croatia	Clay	(Italy) Katia Altilia	(Slovenia) Katarina Srebotnik (Croatia) Jelena Kostanić Tošić	4–6, 2–6
Win	2.	6 October 1997	Thessaloniki, Greece	Hard	(Italy) Katia Altilia	(Hungary) Nóra Köves (Hungary) Adrienn Hegedűs	7–6^{(5)}, 6–1
Win	3.	19 October 1997	Nicosia, Cyprus	Clay	(Italy) Katia Altilia	(Czech Republic) Eva Krejčová (Slovakia) Ľudmila Cervanová	6–4, 7–5
Win	4.	19 January 1998	Båstad, Sweden	Hard	(Denmark) Maiken Pape	(Czech Republic) Gabriela Chmelinová (Czech Republic) Michaela Paštiková	7–6^{(5)}, 6–3
Loss	2.	28 September 1998	Lerida, Spain	Clay	(Denmark) Maria Rasmussen	(Spain) Patricia Aznar (Spain) Mariam Ramón Climent	2–6, 0–6
Win	5.	2 November 1998	Rungsted, Denmark	Hard	(Denmark) Maiken Pape	(Turkey) Gülberk Gültekin (Germany) Karina Karner	6–4, 6–2
Win	6.	12 July 1999	Sezze, Italy	Clay	(Georgia (country)) Nino Louarsabishvili	(Germany) Eva Belbl (New Zealand) Shelley Stephens	6–2, 6–2
