= Elsa O'Riain =

Irish tennis player

- Country (sports): Ireland
- Born: 20 September 1982 (age 42); Cork, Ireland
- Retired: 2005
- College: Harvard Crimson
- Prize money: $14,106

Singles
- Career record: 41–34
- Career titles: 1 ITF
- Highest ranking: No. 382 (21 October 2002)

Grand Slam singles results
- US Open Junior: 1R (1999)

Doubles
- Career record: 48–20
- Career titles: 7 ITF
- Highest ranking: No. 295 (22 September 2003)

Grand Slam doubles results
- US Open Junior: 2R (1999)
- Fed Cup: 9–3
- Last updated on: 26 March 2024.

Elsa O'Riain (born 20 September 1982) is an Irish former professional tennis player.

== Career ==
O'Riain has a career-high singles ranking by the WTA of 382, reached on 21 October 2002. She also has a career-high WTA doubles ranking of 295, achieved on 22 September 2023. O'Riain has won one singles and seven doubles titles on the ITF.

In September 2002, she won the ITF 25K tennis tournament in Glasgow, United Kingdom, with partner Yvonne Doyle. Playing for Ireland at the Fed Cup, she had a win–loss record of 9–3. She played college tennis at Harvard University 2005/2006.

== ITF Circuit finals ==
=== Singles: 2 (1 titles, 1 runner-up) ===
Legend
W10 tournaments

| Result | W–L | Date | Tournament | Tier | Surface | Opponent | Score |
|---|---|---|---|---|---|---|---|
| Loss | 0–1 | Nov 2001 | ITF Haifa, Israel | W10 | Hard | (Israel) Cheli Bargil | 1–6, 7–6^{(4)}, 3–6 |
| Win | 1–1 | Jul 2003 | ITF Felixstowe, United Kingdom | W10 | Grass | (Israel) Yael Glitzenstein | 6–3, 6–1 |

=== Doubles: 8 (7 titles, 1 runner-up) ===
Legend
W25 tournaments
W10 tournaments

| Result | W–L | Date | Tournament | Tier | Surface | Partner | Opponents | Score |
|---|---|---|---|---|---|---|---|---|
| Win | 1–0 | Dec 2001 | ITF Ashkelon, Israel | W10 | Hard | (United Kingdom) Chantal Coombs | (Israel) Yael Glitzenshtein (Ukraine) Yevgenia Savranska | 7–5, 6–3 |
| Loss | 1–1 | Jan 2002 | ITF Hull, United Kingdom | W10 | Hard (i) | (United Kingdom) Claire Curran | (China) Sun Tiantian (China) Zheng Jie | 6–7^{(4)}, 5–7 |
| Win | 2–1 | Aug 2002 | ITF London, United Kingdom | W10 | Hard | (Australia) Sarah Stone | (Australia) Michelle Summerside (United Kingdom) Anna White | 6–4, 6–2 |
| Win | 3–1 | Sep 2002 | ITF Glasgow, United Kingdom | W25 | Hard (i) | (Republic of Ireland) Yvonne Doyle | (Australia) Sarah Stone (Australia) Samantha Stosur | 6–2, 6–4 |
| Win | 4–1 | Sep 2002 | ITF Sunderland, United Kingdom | W10 | Hard (i) | (Republic of Ireland) Yvonne Doyle | (Netherlands) Tessy van de Ven (Netherlands) Suzanne van Hartingsveldt | 6–4, 6–4 |
| Win | 5–1 | Mar 2003 | ITF Cairo, Egypt | W10 | Clay | (United Kingdom) Claire Curran | (Netherlands) Marielle Hoogland (Austria) Jennifer Schmidt | 6–1, 6–4 |
| Win | 6–1 | Jul 2003 | ITF Felixstowe, United Kingdom | W10 | Grass | (Republic of Ireland) Karen Nugent | (New Zealand) Leanne Baker (United Kingdom) Chantal Coombs | 7–6^{(7)}, 7–6^{(2)} |
| Win | 7–1 | Aug 2003 | ITF London, United Kingdom | W10 | Hard | (United Kingdom) Claire Curran | (Russia) Irina Bulykina (Russia) Aleksandra Kulikova | 6–2, 7–6^{(5)} |
