= 2003 Fed Cup Europe/Africa Zone =

Subsection of tennis competition

The Europe/Africa Zone was one of three zones of regional competition in the 2003 Fed Cup.

== Group I ==
- Venue: Estoril, Portugal (outdoor clay)
- Date: 21–26 April

The seventeen teams were divided into three pools of four teams and one pool of five. The top teams of each pool played-off against the second-placed teams to decide which four nations progress to World Group play-offs. The four nations coming last in the pools were relegated to Group II for 2004.

=== Pools ===
| | Pool A | SUI | BLR | EST | LUX |
| 1 | Switzerland (3–0) | | 2–0 | 3–0 | 3–0 |
| 2 | Belarus (2–1) | 0–2 | | 3–0 | 2–1 |
| 3 | Estonia (1–2) | 0–3 | 0–3 | | 3–0 |
| 4 | Luxembourg (0–3) | 0–3 | 1–2 | 0–3 | |

| | Pool B | ISR | YUG | BUL | GEO |
| 1 | Israel (2–1) | | 2–1 | 1–2 | 3–0 |
| 2 | Yugoslavia (2–1) | 1–2 | | 2–1 | 3–0 |
| 3 | Bulgaria (2–1) | 2–1 | 1–2 | | 2–1 |
| 4 | Georgia (0–3) | 0–3 | 0–3 | 1–2 | |

| | Pool C | RSA | UKR | DEN | ROU |
| 1 | South Africa (2–1) | | 1–2 | 3–0 | 2–1 |
| 2 | Ukraine (2–1) | 2–1 | | 1–2 | 2–1 |
| 3 | Denmark (2–1) | 0–3 | 2–1 | | 2–1 |
| 4 | Romania (0–3) | 1–2 | 1–2 | 1–2 | |

| | Pool D | HUN | NED | POL | GBR | IRL |
| 1 | Hungary (3–0) | | 2–1 | 2–1 | 3–0 | np |
| 2 | Netherlands (2–2) | 1–2 | | 1–2 | 2–1 | 2–1 |
| 3 | Poland (2–2) | 1–2 | 2–1 | | 1–2 | 2–1 |
| 4 | Great Britain (2–2) | 0–3 | 1–2 | 2–1 | | 2–1 |
| 5 | Ireland (0–3) | np | 1–2 | 1–2 | 1–2 | |

=== Play-offs ===
| Winning team | Score | Losing team |
|---|---|---|
| Switzerland | 2–0 | Netherlands |
| Israel | 2–1 | Belarus |
| South Africa | 2–0 | Yugoslavia |
| Hungary | 2–1 | Ukraine |

- Switzerland, Israel, South Africa and Hungary advanced to 2003 World Group play-offs.
- Luxembourg, Georgia, Romania, Great Britain and Ireland were relegated to Group II for 2004.

== Group II ==
- Venue: Estoril, Portugal (outdoor clay)
- Date: 28 April – 3 May

The thirteen teams were divided into three pools each of three teams and one pool of four. The top teams of each pool were randomly drawn against each other in two play-offs to decide which two teams advanced to Group I for 2004.

=== Pools ===
| | Pool A | POR | TUR | NOR |
| 1 | Portugal (2–0) | | 3–0 | 3–0 |
| 2 | Turkey (1–1) | 0–3 | | 2–1 |
| 3 | Norway (0–2) | 0–3 | 1–2 | |

| | Pool B | GRE | LAT | ALG |
| 1 | Greece (2–0) | | 2–1 | 3–0 |
| 2 | Latvia (1–1) | 1–2 | | 2–1 |
| 3 | Algeria (0–2) | 0–3 | 1–2 | |

| | Pool C | FIN | EGY | BIH | BOT |
| 1 | Finland (3–0) | | 2–1 | 3–0 | 2–1 |
| 2 | Egypt (2–1) | 1–2 | | 2–1 | 3–0 |
| 3 | Bosnia and Herzegovina (1–2) | 0–3 | 1–2 | | 3–0 |
| 4 | Botswana (0–3) | 1–2 | 0–3 | 0–3 | |

| | Pool D | LIT | MAR | MLT |
| 1 | Lithuania (2–0) | | 2–1 | 2–1 |
| 2 | Morocco (1–1) | 1–2 | | 2–1 |
| 3 | Malta (0–2) | 1–2 | 1–2 | |

=== Play-offs ===
| Winning team | Score | Losing team |
|---|---|---|
| Lithuania | 2–0 | Portugal |
| Greece | 2–1 | Finland |

- Lithuania and Greece advanced to Group I for 2004.

== See also ==
- Fed Cup structure
