= Yomna Farid =

Egyptian tennis player (born 1983)

Yomna Farid يمنى فريد
- Country (sports): Egypt
- Residence: Alexandria, Egypt
- Born: 28 June 1983 (age 41); Alexandria, Egypt
- Turned pro: 1997
- Retired: 2006
- Plays: Right-handed (two-handed backhand)
- Prize money: $11,038

Singles
- Career record: 31–41
- Career titles: 0
- Highest ranking: No. 607 (29 December 2003)

Grand Slam singles results
- French Open Junior: 1R (2001)
- Wimbledon Junior: 1R (2001)

Doubles
- Career record: 21–28
- Career titles: 1 ITF
- Highest ranking: No. 480 (10 November 2003)

Grand Slam doubles results
- French Open Junior: 2R (2001)
- Wimbledon Junior: 1R(2001)

Team competitions
- Fed Cup: 9–19

Yomna Farid (Arabic: يمنى فريد; born 28 June 1983) is a retired Egyptian tennis player.

Farid has career-high WTA rankings of 607 in singles and 480 in doubles, both achieved in 2003. In her career, she won one doubles title on the ITF circuit.

Playing for Egypt in Fed Cup, Farid has a win–loss record of 9–19.

== Career ==
Born in Alexandria, Farid started playing tennis aged 12; her favourite surface has been clay.

She had a successful junior career, winning six singles and five doubles titles on the ITF junior circuit. Her career-high ranking as a junior was world number 38, and she finished her junior career with a record of 80–45.

Farid made her WTA Tour main-draw debut at the 1999 Dreamland Egypt Classic, in the doubles event partnering Marwa El Wany. She retired from professional tennis 2006.

== ITF finals ==
=== Doubles (1–1) ===
Legend $50,000 tournaments $25,000 tournaments $10,000 tournaments	Finals by surface Hard (1–1) Clay (0–0)

Result	Date	Location	Surface	Partner	Opponents	Score
Loss	25 October 2003	Lagos, Nigeria	Hard	(Egypt) Heidi El Tabakh	(United Kingdom) Rebecca Dandeniya (South Africa) Michelle Snyman	5–7, 3–6
Win	2 November 2003	Lagos, Nigeria	Hard	(Egypt) Heidi El Tabakh	(South Africa) Lizaan du Plessis (Egypt) Noha Mohsen	6–1, 5–7, 6–1

== ITF junior finals ==
Category G1
Category G2
Category G3
Category G4
Category G5

=== Singles (6–2) ===
Result	No.	Date	Location	Surface	Opponent	Score
Loss	1.	5 September 1999	Beirut, Lebanon	Hard	(Germany) Tanja Hırschauer	6–4, 2–6, 1–6
Win	2.	13 August 2000	Cairo, Egypt	Clay	(Egypt) Noha Mohsen	6–4, 6–4
Win	3.	26 August 2000	Damascus, Syria	Clay	(Egypt) Amani Khalifa	3–6, 6–4, 6–1
Win	4.	3 September 2000	Beirut, Lebanon	Clay	(Egypt) Amani Khalifa	6–1, 6–3
Win	5.	22 September 2000	Cairo, Egypt	Clay	(Russia) Alexandra Kostikova	6–4, 6–3
Win	6.	3 March 2001	Bandar Seri Begawan, Brunei	Hard	(Egypt) Amani Khalifa	6–3, 6–3
Win	7.	7 April 2001	Tunis, Tunisia	Clay	(France) Sylvia Montero	6–1, 6–7^{(2)}, 6–3
Loss	8.	15 April 2001	Tunis, Tunisia	Clay	(South Africa) Karin Coetzee	2–6, 1–6

=== Doubles (5–2) ===
Result	No.	Date	Location	Surface	Partner	Opponents	Score
Loss	1.	21 August 1998	Giza, Egypt	Clay	(Egypt) Dina Khalil	(Algeria) Siham-Soumeya Ben Nacer (Algeria) Feriel Esseghir	5–7, 2–6
Win	2.	5 September 1999	Beirut, Lebanon	Hard	(Egypt) Dalia Coutry	(United Kingdom) Kerry Ann North (United Kingdom) Karen Highfield	3–6, 6–3, 6–1
Win	3.	13 August 2000	Cairo, Egypt	Clay	(Egypt) Dalia Coutry	(Morocco) Nisrine Hajbane (Morocco) Meryem Lahlou	w/o
Win	4.	18 August 2000	Cairo, Egypt	Clay	(Egypt) Dalia Coutry	(Chinese Taipei) Tseng Chun-ning (Chinese Taipei) Wang Ting-wen	6–3, 6–1
Win	5.	26 August 2000	Damascus, Syria	Clay	(Egypt) Amani Khalifa	(Egypt) Amal Basha (Egypt) Reem Raouf	6–4, 6–1
Win	6.	3 September 2000	Beirut, Lebanon	Clay	(Egypt) Amani Khalifa	(Egypt) Reem Raouf (Egypt) Sara Sabry	7–6^{(7)}, 6–2
Loss	7.	15 April 2001	Tunis, Tunisia	Clay	(Egypt) Amani Khalifa	(Algeria) Sana Ben Salah (Algeria) Feriel Esseghir	6–3, 2–6, 3–6
