= Liechtenstein Billie Jean King Cup team =

National women's tennis team of Liechtenstein

Liechtenstein
- Captain: Daniel Kieber
- Nations Ranking: 58 ▼5 (16 November 2015)
- Colors: blue & red
- First year: 1996
- Years played: 12
- Ties played (W–L): 53 (23–30)
- Best finish: Zonal Group I RR (2015)
- Most total wins: Stephanie Vogt (20–15)
- Most singles wins: Stephanie Vogt (13–10)
- Most doubles wins: Kathinka von Deichmann (10–4)
- Best doubles team: Stephanie Vogt / Kathinka von Deichmann (10–4)
- Most ties played: Stephanie Vogt (23)
- Most years played: Stephanie Vogt (6)

The Liechtenstein Billie Jean King Cup team represents Liechtenstein in the Billie Jean King Cup tennis competition and are governed by the Liechtensteiner Tennisverband. They have not competed since 2016.

== History ==
Liechtenstein competed in its first Fed Cup in 1996. Their best result came in 2014, when they defeated Bosnia and Herzegovina in their Group II promotional play-off, resulting in Liechtenstein's accession to Group I for the first time in history.

== See also ==
- Billie Jean King Cup
- Liechtenstein Davis Cup team
