= 2025 Billie Jean King Cup Europe/Africa Zone =

Subsection of tennis competition

The Europe/Africa Zone is one of three zones of regional competition in the 2025 Billie Jean King Cup.

== Group I ==
- Date: 8–12 April 2025
- Venue: SEB Arena, Vilnius, Lithuania (Hard)

Three round-robin pools of three (Pool A, Pool B, Pool C) and one round-robin pool of four (Pool D), followed by the top two nations in each pool facing each other in promotional play-offs (A1 v C2, B1 v D2, C1 v A2, D1 v B2). The bottom nations in each pool will compete to avoid relegation (A3 v B3, C3 v D4). The team finishing third in Pool D (D3) gets a bye.

The four teams to win their promotional play-off advance to the play-offs in November 2025, whereas the two teams to lose their relegation play-offs drop down to Europe/Africa Group II in 2026.

=== Participating teams ===
- Austria

(Julia Grabher, Tamara Kostic, Arabella Koller, Mavie Österreicher, Ekaterina Perelygina,
Captain: Marion Maruska)

- Belgium

(Greet Minnen, Hanne Vandewinkel, Sofia Costoulas, Magali Kempen, Jeline Vandromme,
Captain: Wim Fissette)

- Croatia

(Antonia Ružić, Petra Marčinko, Tara Würth, Iva Primorac, Lea Bošković,
Captain: Marin Bradarić)

- France

(Varvara Gracheva, Diane Parry, Clara Burel, Alizé Cornet, Caroline Garcia,
Captain: Julien Benneteau)

- Greece

(Valentini Grammatikopoulou, Martha Matoula, Dimitra Pavlou, Eleni Christofi, Despina Papamichail,
Captain: Vasileios Skorilas)

- Hungary

(Anna Bondar, Amarissa Tóth, Timea Babos, Fanny Stollar, Adrienn Nagy,
Captain: Kornél Bardóczky)

- Latvia

(Darja Semeņistaja, Diāna Marcinkēviča, Beatrise Zeltiņa, Keisija Berzina, Anna Ozerova,
Captain: Pjotrs Necajevs)

- Lithuania

(Justina Mikulskytė, Patricija Paukštytė, Klaudija Bubelytė, Andrė Lukošiūtė,
Captain: Laurynas Grigelis)

- Portugal

(Francisca Jorge, Matilde Jorge, Angelina Voloshchuk, Inês Murta
Captain: Neuza Silva)

- Serbia

(Natalija Senić, Mia Ristić, Anja Stanković, Teodora Kostović, Luna Vujović
Captain: Dušan Vemić)

- Slovenia

(Pia Lovrič, Živa Falkner, Kaja Juvan, Ela Nala Milić, Alija Senica,
Captain: Iztok Kukec)

- Sweden

(Lisa Zaar, Nellie Taraba Wallberg, Linea Bajraliu, Lea Nilsson, Rebecca Peterson,
Captain: Johanna Larsson)

- Turkey

(Zeynep Sönmez, İpek Öz, Ayla Aksu, Çağla Büyükakçay, Deniz Dilek
Captain: Alaattin Bora Gerçeker)

=== Pool A ===
#	Team	P	W	L	Matches W-L	Sets W-L
1	Turkey	2	2	0	4–2	10–5
2	France	2	1	1	4–2	8–6
3	Sweden	2	0	2	1–5	4–11

==== France vs Sweden ====
France
3
SEB Arena, Vilnius, Lithuania
8 April 2025
Hard

Sweden
0

			1	2	3
1	(France) (Sweden)	Clara Burel; Nellie Taraba Wallberg	6; 2	7; 5
2	(France) (Sweden)	Varvara Gracheva; Lisa Zaar	6; 2	6; 3
3	(France) (Sweden)	Alizé Cornet / Diane Parry; Linea Bajraliu / Lisa Zaar	6; 2	4; 6	13; 11

==== France vs Turkiye ====
France
1
SEB Arena, Vilnius, Lithuania
9 April 2025
Hard

Turkey
2

			1	2	3
1	(France) (Turkey)	Clara Burel; Ayla Aksu	4; 1			retired
2	(France) (Turkey)	Varvara Gracheva; Zeynep Sönmez	2; 6	1; 6
3	(France) (Turkey)	Alizé Cornet / Diane Parry; Çağla Büyükakçay / İpek Öz	6; 4	1; 6	10; 7

==== Turkiye vs Sweden ====
Turkey
2
SEB Arena, Vilnius, Lithuania
10 April 2025
Hard

Sweden
1

			1	2	3
1	(Turkey) (Sweden)	Ayla Aksu; Nellie Taraba Wallberg	6; 3	5; 7	6; 1
2	(Turkey) (Sweden)	Zeynep Sönmez; Lisa Zaar	6; 2	6; 4
3	(Turkey) (Sweden)	Çağla Büyükakçay / Deniz Dilek; Linea Bajraliu / Lea Nilsson	6; 1	3; 6	4; 10

=== Pool B ===
#	Team	P	W	L	Matches W-L	Sets W-L
1	Slovenia	2	2	0	4–2	10–6
2	Serbia	2	1	1	3–3	6–7
3	Lithuania	2	0	2	2–4	6–9

==== Slovenia vs Lithuania ====
Slovenia
2
SEB Arena, Vilnius, Lithuania
8 April 2025
Hard

Lithuania
1

			1	2	3
1	(Slovenia) (Lithuania)	Kaja Juvan; Klaudija Bubelytė	4; 6	6; 4	6; 1
2	(Slovenia) (Lithuania)	Pia Lovrič; Justina Mikulskytė	6; 4	3; 6	2; 6
3	(Slovenia) (Lithuania)	Živa Falkner / Kaja Juvan; Justina Mikulskytė / Patricija Paukštytė	4; 6	7^{7} 6^{2}	10; 6

==== Slovenia vs Serbia ====
Slovenia
2
SEB Arena, Vilnius, Lithuania
9 April 2025
Hard

Serbia
1

			1	2	3
1	(Slovenia) (Serbia)	Kaja Juvan; Mia Ristić	7^{7} 6^{5}	6; 4
2	(Slovenia) (Serbia)	Živa Falkner; Natalija Senić	6; 3	6^{6} 7^{8}	0; 2	retired
3	(Slovenia) (Serbia)	Kaja Juvan / Pia Lovrič; Natalija Senić / Anja Stanković	6; 4	7^{9} 6^{7}

==== Serbia vs Lithuania ====
Serbia
2
SEB Arena, Vilnius, Lithuania
10 April 2025
Hard

Lithuania
1

			1	2	3
1	(Serbia) (Lithuania)	Teodora Kostović; Klaudija Bubelytė	6; 4	6; 2
2	(Serbia) (Lithuania)	Mia Ristić; Justina Mikulskytė	7; 5	6; 1
3	(Serbia) (Lithuania)	Anja Stanković / Luna Vujović; Andrė Lukošiūtė / Patricija Paukštytė	5; 7	1; 6

=== Pool C ===
#	Team	P	W	L	Matches W-L	Sets W-L
1	Belgium	2	2	0	5–1	10–3
2	Hungary	2	1	1	4–2	9–4
3	Greece	2	0	2	0–6	0–12

==== Belgium vs Greece ====
Belgium
3
SEB Arena, Vilnius, Lithuania
8 April 2025
Hard

Greece
0

			1	2	3
1	(Belgium) (Greece)	Hanne Vandewinkel; Valentini Grammatikopoulou	6; 4	6; 4
2	(Belgium) (Greece)	Greet Minnen; Martha Matoula	6; 1	6; 1
3	(Belgium) (Greece)	Magali Kempen / Sofia Costoulas; Eleni Christofi / Dimitra Pavlou	6; 2	6; 3

==== Belgium vs Hungary ====
Belgium
2
SEB Arena, Vilnius, Lithuania
9 April 2025
Hard

Hungary
1

			1	2	3
1	(Belgium) (Hungary)	Sofia Costoulas; Amarissa Tóth	6; 1	5; 7	6; 0
2	(Belgium) (Hungary)	Greet Minnen; Anna Bondar	6; 1	6; 2
3	(Belgium) (Hungary)	Magali Kempen / Greet Minnen; Timea Babos / Fanny Stollar	3; 6	2; 6

==== Hungary vs Greece ====
Hungary
3
SEB Arena, Vilnius, Lithuania
10 April 2025
Hard

Greece
0

			1	2	3
1	(Hungary) (Greece)	Amarissa Tóth; Dimitra Pavlou	6; 1	6; 2
2	(Hungary) (Greece)	Anna Bondar; Martha Matoula	6; 4	7; 5
3	(Hungary) (Greece)	Timea Babos / Fanny Stollar; Valentini Grammatikopoulou / Martha Matoula	6; 1	6; 3

=== Pool D ===
#	Team	P	W	L	Matches W-L	Sets W-L
1	Croatia	3	2	1	6–3	13–9
2	Portugal	3	2	1	5–4	12–9
3	Latvia	3	2	1	5–4	11–11
4	Austria	3	0	3	2–7	7–14

==== Latvia vs Portugal ====
Latvia
0
SEB Arena, Vilnius, Lithuania
8 April 2025
Hard

Portugal
3

			1	2	3
1	(Latvia) (Portugal)	Beatrise Zeltiņa; Matilde Jorge	4; 6	6; 3	5; 7
2	(Latvia) (Portugal)	Darja Semeņistaja; Francisca Jorge	3; 6	4; 6
3	(Latvia) (Portugal)	Keisija Berzina / Diāna Marcinkēviča; Inês Murta / Angelina Voloshchuk	3; 6	4; 6

==== Austria vs Croatia ====
Austria
1
SEB Arena, Vilnius, Lithuania
8 April 2025
Hard

Croatia
2

			1	2	3
1	(Austria) (Croatia)	Tamara Kostic; Petra Marčinko	1; 6	1; 6
2	(Austria) (Croatia)	Julia Grabher; Antonia Ružić	6; 4	6; 0
3	(Austria) (Croatia)	Julia Grabher / Ekaterina Perelygina; Petra Marčinko / Tara Würth	3; 6	6; 4	7; 10

==== Austria vs Latvia ====
Austria
0
SEB Arena, Vilnius, Lithuania
9 April 2025
Hard

Latvia
3

			1	2	3
1	(Austria) (Latvia)	Ekaterina Perelygina; Beatrise Zeltiņa	7^{7} 6^{5}	2; 6	2; 6
2	(Austria) (Latvia)	Julia Grabher; Darja Semeņistaja	0; 6	6; 4	0; 6
3	(Austria) (Latvia)	Arabella Koller / Ekaterina Perelygina; Keisija Berzina / Darja Semeņistaja	3; 6	4; 6

==== Portugal vs Croatia ====
Portugal
0
SEB Arena, Vilnius, Lithuania
9 April 2025
Hard

Croatia
3

			1	2	3
1	(Portugal) (Croatia)	Matilde Jorge; Petra Marčinko	1; 6	6; 3	5; 7
2	(Portugal) (Croatia)	Francisca Jorge; Antonia Ružić	6; 4	1; 6	4; 6
3	(Portugal) (Croatia)	Inês Murta / Angelina Voloshchuk; Iva Primorac / Tara Würth	3; 6	1; 6

==== Latvia vs Croatia ====
Latvia
2
SEB Arena, Vilnius, Lithuania
10 April 2025
Hard

Croatia
1

			1	2	3
1	(Latvia) (Croatia)	Beatrise Zeltiņa; Petra Marčinko	3; 6	1; 6
2	(Latvia) (Croatia)	Darja Semeņistaja; Antonia Ružić	6; 3	6; 0
3	(Latvia) (Croatia)	Darja Semeņistaja / Beatrise Zeltiņa; Iva Primorac / Tara Würth	0; 6	6; 3	10; 7

==== Austria vs Portugal ====
Austria
1
SEB Arena, Vilnius, Lithuania
10 April 2025
Hard

Portugal
2

			1	2	3
1	(Austria) (Portugal)	Ekaterina Perelygina; Angelina Voloshchuk	6; 4	6; 3
2	(Austria) (Portugal)	Arabella Koller; Matilde Jorge	1; 6	1; 6
3	(Austria) (Portugal)	Arabella Koller / Ekaterina Perelygina; Matilde Jorge / Angelina Voloshchuk	2; 6	2; 6

=== Promotion Play-Offs ===
==== Turkiye vs Hungary ====
Turkey
2
SEB Arena, Vilnius, Lithuania
11 April 2025
Hard

Hungary
0

			1	2	3
1	(Turkey) (Hungary)	Ayla Aksu; Amarissa Tóth	2; 6	6; 4	6; 0
2	(Turkey) (Hungary)	Zeynep Sönmez; Anna Bondar	6; 2	6; 2
3	(Turkey) (Hungary)	Çağla Büyükakçay / İpek Öz; Timea Babos / Fanny Stollar				not played

==== Belgium vs France ====
Belgium
2
SEB Arena, Vilnius, Lithuania
11 April 2025
Hard

France
0

			1	2	3
1	(Belgium) (France)	Jeline Vandromme; Alizé Cornet	6; 3	6; 3
2	(Belgium) (France)	Greet Minnen; Varvara Gracheva	6; 2	4; 6	6; 1
3	(Belgium) (France)	Magali Kempen / Greet Minnen; Caroline Garcia / Diane Parry				not played

==== Slovenia vs Portugal ====
Slovenia
0
SEB Arena, Vilnius, Lithuania
12 April 2025
Hard

Portugal
2

			1	2	3
1	(Slovenia) (Portugal)	Kaja Juvan; Matilde Jorge	6; 1	3; 6	5; 7
2	(Slovenia) (Portugal)	Pia Lovrič; Francisca Jorge	6; 2	3; 6	3; 6
3	(Slovenia) (Portugal)	Živa Falkner / Kaja Juvan; Francisca Jorge / Matilde Jorge				not played

==== Croatia vs Serbia ====
Croatia
2
SEB Arena, Vilnius, Lithuania
12 April 2025
Hard

Serbia
1

			1	2	3
1	(Croatia) (Serbia)	Petra Marčinko; Teodora Kostović	6; 3	6; 4
2	(Croatia) (Serbia)	Antonia Ružić; Mia Ristić	2; 6	6; 4	3; 6
3	(Croatia) (Serbia)	Petra Marčinko / Tara Würth; Teodora Kostović / Natalija Senić	6; 1	6; 2

=== Relegation Play-Offs ===
==== Sweden vs Greece ====
Sweden
2
SEB Arena, Vilnius, Lithuania
11 April 2025
Hard

Greece
1

			1	2	3
1	(Sweden) (Greece)	Linea Bajraliu; Valentini Grammatikopoulou	1; 6	6; 4	6; 2
2	(Sweden) (Greece)	Lisa Zaar; Martha Matoula	1; 6	1; 6
3	(Sweden) (Greece)	Linea Bajraliu / Nellie Taraba Wallberg; Valentini Grammatikopoulou / Martha Matoula	6; 3	3; 6	10; 2

==== Lithuania vs Austria ====
Lithuania
2
SEB Arena, Vilnius, Lithuania
12 April 2025
Hard

Austria
0

			1	2	3
1	(Lithuania) (Austria)	Klaudija Bubelytė; Ekaterina Perelygina	6; 4	6; 1
2	(Lithuania) (Austria)	Justina Mikulskytė; Julia Grabher	7^{7} 6^{3}	3; 6	7; 5
3	(Lithuania) (Austria)	Justina Mikulskytė / Patricija Paukštytė; Julia Grabher / Ekaterina Perelygina				not played

=== Promotions/Relegations ===
- Belgium, Croatia, Portugal and Turkey advanced to the 2025 Billie Jean King Cup play-offs, while Slovenia was later promoted as the highest ranked non-promoted team in each 2025 Regional Group I event.
- Austria and Greece were relegated to Europe/Africa Zone Group II in 2026.

== Group II ==
- Date: 7–12 April 2025
- Venue: Herodotou Tennis Academy, Larnaca, Cyprus

Two-stage round robin, with one pool of three (Pool A) and two pools of four (Pool B, Pool C), followed by the winners of each pool playing each other in a round robin (A1, B1, C1). The top two teams in that round robin are promoted to Europe/Africa Group I in 2026.

The bottom teams in Pools B and C (B4, C4) are relegated.

=== Participating teams ===
- Bosnia and Herzegovina

(Suana Tucaković, Sara Mikača, Anita Wagner, Ema Burgić, Tea Kovačević,
Captain: Ismar Gorčić)

- Bulgaria

(Lia Karatantcheva, Isabella Shinikova, Denislava Glushkova, Rositsa Dencheva, Lidia Encheva,
Captain: Magdalena Maleeva)

- Cyprus

(Raluka Serban, Daria Frayman, Olga Danilova, Nina Andronicou, Eva Panova,
Captain: Yiannos Hadjigeorgiou)

- Egypt

(Sandra Samir, Lamis Alhussein Abdel Aziz, Gana Hossam, Amira Mohamed,
Captain: Karim Zaher)

- Estonia

(Elena Malõgina, Laura Rahnel, Valeria Gorlats, Kiira Pashkov, Grete Gull
Captain: Marten Tamla)

- Georgia

(Mariam Bolkvadze, Ekaterine Gorgodze, Zoziya Kardava,Oksana Kalashnikova,
Captain: Margalita Chakhnashvili)

- Israel

(Lina Glushko, Mika Buchnik, Alian Zack, Maayan Laron,
Captain: Ronen Moralli)

- Kosovo

(Learta Muharremi, Aja Broqi, Forta Morina, Adrijana Lekaj, Vesa Gjinaj,
Captain: Osman Recica)

- North Macedonia

(Lina Gjorcheska, Magdalena Stoilkovska, Ana Mitevska, Jana Bozinovska
Captain: Dimitar Labudovikj)

- Norway

(Malene Helgø, Ulrikke Eikeri, Astrid Brune Olsen, Matylda Burylo,
Captain: Jorgen Vestli)

- South Africa

(Jahnie Van Zyl, Donna Le Roux, Marilouise Van Zyl, Kaitlyn Leigh Ramduth, Abigayel Vosloo,
Captain: Roxanne Caitlin Clarke)

=== Pool A ===
#	Team	P	W	L	Matches W-L	Sets W-L
1	Bulgaria	2	2	0	5–1	10–3
2	Egypt	2	1	1	4–2	8–4
3	Israel	2	0	2	0–6	1–12

==== Egypt vs Israel ====
Egypt
3
Herodotou Tennis Academy, Larnaca, Cyprus
7 April 2025
Hard

Israel
0

			1	2	3
1	(Egypt) (Israel)	Lamis Alhussein Abdel Aziz; Mika Buchnik	6; 2	6; 2
2	(Egypt) (Israel)	Sandra Samir; Lina Glushko	6; 2	6; 4
3	(Egypt) (Israel)	Gana Hossam / Sandra Samir; Mika Buchnik / Maayan Laron	6; 4	6; 4

==== Bulgaria vs Israel ====
Bulgaria
3
Herodotou Tennis Academy, Larnaca, Cyprus
8 April 2025
Hard

Israel
0

			1	2	3
1	(Bulgaria) (Israel)	Denislava Glushkova; Maayan Laron	6; 0	6; 4
2	(Bulgaria) (Israel)	Lia Karatantcheva; Lina Glushko	1; 6	6; 3	7^{7} 6^{3}
3	(Bulgaria) (Israel)	Rositsa Dencheva / Isabella Shinikova; Mika Buchnik / Alian Zack	6; 0	6; 2

==== Bulgaria vs Egypt ====
Bulgaria
2
Herodotou Tennis Academy, Larnaca, Cyprus
9 April 2025
Hard

Egypt
1

			1	2	3
1	(Bulgaria) (Egypt)	Rositsa Dencheva; Lamis Alhussein Abdel Aziz	6; 3	6; 3
2	(Bulgaria) (Egypt)	Lia Karatantcheva; Sandra Samir	6; 4	6; 3
3	(Bulgaria) (Egypt)	Lia Karatantcheva / Isabella Shinikova; Gana Hossam / Amira Mohamed	1; 1			retired

=== Pool B ===
#	Team	P	W	L	Matches W-L	Sets W-L
1	Georgia	3	3	0	7–2	15–6
2	Cyprus	3	1	2	4–5	11–11
3	Bosnia and Herzegovina	3	1	2	4–5	10–12
4	Estonia	3	1	2	3–6	7–14

==== Georgia vs Bosnia and Herzegovina ====
Georgia
2
Herodotou Tennis Academy, Larnaca, Cyprus
7 April 2025
Hard

Bosnia and Herzegovina
1

			1	2	3
1	(Georgia (country)) (Bosnia and Herzegovina)	Ekaterine Gorgodze; Suana Tucaković	6; 4	6; 2
2	(Georgia (country)) (Bosnia and Herzegovina)	Mariam Bolkvadze; Ema Burgić	3; 6	6; 1	4; 6
3	(Georgia (country)) (Bosnia and Herzegovina)	Ekaterine Gorgodze / Oksana Kalashnikova; Ema Burgić / Anita Wagner	6; 1	4; 6	11; 9

==== Estonia vs Cyprus ====
Estonia
2
Herodotou Tennis Academy, Larnaca, Cyprus
7 April 2025
Hard

Cyprus
1

			1	2	3
1	(Estonia) (Cyprus)	Laura Rahnel; Daria Frayman	1; 6	2; 6
2	(Estonia) (Cyprus)	Elena Malõgina; Raluka Serban	0; 6	6; 2	7; 5
3	(Estonia) (Cyprus)	Valeria Gorlats / Elena Malõgina; Daria Frayman / Raluka Serban	6; 3	5; 7	10; 4

==== Estonia vs Georgia ====
Estonia
0
Herodotou Tennis Academy, Larnaca, Cyprus
8 April 2025
Hard

Georgia
3

			1	2	3
1	(Estonia) (Georgia (country))	Laura Rahnel; Ekaterine Gorgodze	4; 6	3; 6
2	(Estonia) (Georgia (country))	Elena Malõgina; Mariam Bolkvadze	0; 6	2; 6
3	(Estonia) (Georgia (country))	Valeria Gorlats / Kiira Pashkov; Ekaterine Gorgodze / Oksana Kalashnikova	4; 6	6^{5} 7^{7}

==== Bosnia and Herzegovina vs Cyprus ====
Bosnia and Herzegovina
1
Herodotou Tennis Academy, Larnaca, Cyprus
8 April 2025
Hard

Cyprus
2

			1	2	3
1	(Bosnia and Herzegovina) (Cyprus)	Suana Tucaković; Daria Frayman	3; 6	2; 6
2	(Bosnia and Herzegovina) (Cyprus)	Ema Burgić; Raluka Serban	6; 3	7; 5
3	(Bosnia and Herzegovina) (Cyprus)	Ema Burgić / Anita Wagner; Daria Frayman / Raluka Serban	4; 6	6; 3	4; 10

==== Georgia vs Cyprus ====
Georgia
2
Herodotou Tennis Academy, Larnaca, Cyprus
9 April 2025
Hard

Cyprus
1

			1	2	3
1	(Georgia (country)) (Cyprus)	Ekaterine Gorgodze; Daria Frayman	3; 6	0; 6
2	(Georgia (country)) (Cyprus)	Mariam Bolkvadze; Raluka Serban	3; 6	6; 1	6; 1
3	(Georgia (country)) (Cyprus)	Mariam Bolkvadze / Ekaterine Gorgodze; Daria Frayman / Raluka Serban	6; 0	6; 0

==== Estonia vs Bosnia and Herzegovina ====
Estonia
1
Herodotou Tennis Academy, Larnaca, Cyprus
9 April 2025
Hard

Bosnia and Herzegovina
2

			1	2	3
1	(Estonia) (Bosnia and Herzegovina)	Valeria Gorlats; Suana Tucaković	4; 6	7; 5	6^{5} 7^{7}
2	(Estonia) (Bosnia and Herzegovina)	Elena Malõgina; Ema Burgić	4; 6	3; 6
3	(Estonia) (Bosnia and Herzegovina)	Grete Gull / Kiira Pashkov; Tea Kovačević / Sara Mikača	7; 5	6; 2

=== Pool C ===
#	Team	P	W	L	Matches W-L	Sets W-L
1	Norway	3	3	0	8–1	16–4
2	North Macedonia	3	2	1	6–3	13–7
3	South Africa	3	1	2	4–5	9–12
4	Kosovo	3	0	3	0–9	3–18

==== Norway vs Kosovo ====
Norway
3
Herodotou Tennis Academy, Larnaca, Cyprus
7 April 2025
Hard

Kosovo
0

			1	2	3
1	(Norway) (Kosovo)	Ulrikke Eikeri; Vesa Gjinaj	6; 0	6; 0
2	(Norway) (Kosovo)	Malene Helgø; Adrijana Lekaj	6; 0	6; 2
3	(Norway) (Kosovo)	Ulrikke Eikeri / Astrid Brune Olsen; Vesa Gjinaj / Adrijana Lekaj	6; 2	6; 3

==== North Macedonia vs South Africa ====
North Macedonia
2
Herodotou Tennis Academy, Larnaca, Cyprus
7 April 2025
Hard

South Africa
1

			1	2	3
1	(North Macedonia) (South Africa)	Magdalena Stoilkovska; Donna Le Roux	6; 3	6; 0
2	(North Macedonia) (South Africa)	Lina Gjorcheska; Marilouise Van Zyl	6; 1	6; 2
3	(North Macedonia) (South Africa)	Jana Bozinovska / Ana Mitevska; Donna Le Roux / Jahnie Van Zyl	2; 6	0; 6

==== Norway vs North Macedonia ====
Norway
2
Herodotou Tennis Academy, Larnaca, Cyprus
8 April 2025
Hard

North Macedonia
1

			1	2	3
1	(Norway) (North Macedonia)	Ulrikke Eikeri; Magdalena Stoilkovska	6; 3	6; 2
2	(Norway) (North Macedonia)	Malene Helgø; Lina Gjorcheska	0; 6	2; 6
3	(Norway) (North Macedonia)	Ulrikke Eikeri / Astrid Brune Olsen; Lina Gjorcheska / Magdalena Stoilkovska	6; 4	1; 6	10; 5

==== South Africa vs Kosovo ====
South Africa
3
Herodotou Tennis Academy, Larnaca, Cyprus
8 April 2025
Hard

Kosovo
0

			1	2	3
1	(South Africa) (Kosovo)	Donna Le Roux; Vesa Gjinaj	6; 3	3; 6	6; 3
2	(South Africa) (Kosovo)	Jahnie Van Zyl; Adrijana Lekaj	5; 7	6; 3	6; 0
3	(South Africa) (Kosovo)	Donna Le Roux / Marilouise Van Zyl; Aja Broqi / Learta Muharremi	6; 0	6; 1

==== Norway vs South Africa ====
Norway
3
Herodotou Tennis Academy, Larnaca, Cyprus
9 April 2025
Hard

South Africa
0

			1	2	3
1	(Norway) (South Africa)	Ulrikke Eikeri; Marilouise Van Zyl	6; 1	0; 6	6; 2
2	(Norway) (South Africa)	Malene Helgø; Jahnie Van Zyl	6; 4	6; 1
3	(Norway) (South Africa)	Matylda Burylo / Astrid Brune Olsen; Kaitlyn Leigh Ramduth / Abigayel Vosloo	6; 3	6; 0

==== North Macedonia vs Kosovo ====
North Macedonia
3
Herodotou Tennis Academy, Larnaca, Cyprus
9 April 2025
Hard

Kosovo
0

			1	2	3
1	(North Macedonia) (Kosovo)	Magdalena Stoilkovska; Vesa Gjinaj	2; 6	6; 4	6; 2
2	(North Macedonia) (Kosovo)	Lina Gjorcheska; Forta Morina	6; 1	6; 0
3	(North Macedonia) (Kosovo)	Jana Bozinovska / Ana Mitevska; Aja Broqi / Adrijana Lekaj	6; 3	7; 5

=== Promotion Play-Offs ===
#	Team	P	W	L	Matches W-L	Sets W-L
1	Georgia	2	2	0	4–1	8–4
2	Norway	2	1	1	3–3	7–6
3	Bulgaria	2	0	2	1–4	3–8

==== Bulgaria vs Norway ====
Bulgaria
1
Herodotou Tennis Academy, Larnaca, Cyprus
10 April 2025
Hard

Norway
2

			1	2	3
1	(Bulgaria) (Norway)	Rositsa Dencheva; Astrid Brune Olsen	6^{9} 7^{11}	3; 6
2	(Bulgaria) (Norway)	Lia Karatantcheva; Malene Helgø	6; 4	6; 2
3	(Bulgaria) (Norway)	Lia Karatantcheva / Isabella Shinikova; Ulrikke Eikeri / Malene Helgø	5; 7	5; 7

==== Bulgaria vs Georgia ====
Bulgaria
0
Herodotou Tennis Academy, Larnaca, Cyprus
11 April 2025
Hard

Georgia
2

			1	2	3
1	(Bulgaria) (Georgia (country))	Denislava Glushkova; Ekaterine Gorgodze	1; 6	1; 6
2	(Bulgaria) (Georgia (country))	Lia Karatantcheva; Mariam Bolkvadze	7; 5	6^{7} 7^{9}	2; 6
3	(Bulgaria) (Georgia (country))	Lia Karatantcheva / Isabella Shinikova; Oksana Kalashnikova / Zoziya Kardava				not played

==== Georgia vs Norway ====
Georgia
2
Herodotou Tennis Academy, Larnaca, Cyprus
12 April 2025
Hard

Norway
1

			1	2	3
1	(Georgia (country)) (Norway)	Zoziya Kardava; Matylda Burylo	6; 1	6; 2
2	(Georgia (country)) (Norway)	Mariam Bolkvadze; Astrid Brune Olsen				w/o
3	(Georgia (country)) (Norway)	Oksana Kalashnikova / Zoziya Kardava; Astrid Brune Olsen / Malene Helgø	2; 6	6; 4	11; 9

=== 4th to 6th Play-Offs ===
#	Team	P	W	L	Matches W-L	Sets W-L
4	Cyprus	2	2	0	4–1	8–2
5	Egypt	2	1	1	4–2	8–6
6	North Macedonia	2	0	2	0–5	2–10

==== Egypt vs North Macedonia ====
Egypt
3
Herodotou Tennis Academy, Larnaca, Cyprus
10 April 2025
Hard

North Macedonia
0

			1	2	3
1	(Egypt) (North Macedonia)	Gana Hossam; Magdalena Stoilkovska	0; 6	6; 3	6; 0
2	(Egypt) (North Macedonia)	Lamis Alhussein Abdel Aziz; Lina Gjorcheska	3; 6	4; 1		retired
3	(Egypt) (North Macedonia)	Lamis Alhussein Abdel Aziz / Amira Mohamed; Jana Bozinovska / Ana Mitevska	6; 2	6; 2

==== Egypt vs Cyprus ====
Egypt
1
Herodotou Tennis Academy, Larnaca, Cyprus
11 April 2025
Hard

Cyprus
2

			1	2	3
1	(Egypt) (Cyprus)	Gana Hossam; Daria Frayman	3; 6	1; 6
2	(Egypt) (Cyprus)	Lamis Alhussein Abdel Aziz; Raluka Serban	3; 6	4; 6
3	(Egypt) (Cyprus)	Gana Hossam / Amira Mohamed; Nina Andronicou / Olga Danilova	6; 3	7^{7} 6^{2}

==== Cyprus vs North Macedonia ====
Cyprus
2
Herodotou Tennis Academy, Larnaca, Cyprus
12 April 2025
Hard

North Macedonia
0

			1	2	3
1	(Cyprus) (North Macedonia)	Nina Andronicou; Ana Mitevska	6; 2	6; 0
2	(Cyprus) (North Macedonia)	Daria Frayman; Magdalena Stoilkovska	6; 4	6; 3
3	(Cyprus) (North Macedonia)	Olga Danilova / Daria Frayman; Jana Bozinovska / Ana Mitevska				not played

=== 7th to 9th Play-Offs ===
#	Team	P	W	L	Matches W-L	Sets W-L
7	Bosnia and Herzegovina	2	2	0	4–1	9–4
8	Israel	2	1	1	3–3	8–7
9	South Africa	2	0	2	1–4	2–8

==== Israel vs South Africa ====
Israel
2
Herodotou Tennis Academy, Larnaca, Cyprus
10 April 2025
Hard

South Africa
1

			1	2	3
1	(Israel) (South Africa)	Mika Buchnik; Marilouise Van Zyl	6; 1	6; 2
2	(Israel) (South Africa)	Lina Glushko; Jahnie Van Zyl	6; 3	6; 3
3	(Israel) (South Africa)	Lina Glushko / Alian Zack; Donna Le Roux / Jahnie Van Zyl	4; 6	5; 7

==== Israel vs Bosnia and Herzegovina ====
Israel
1
Herodotou Tennis Academy, Larnaca, Cyprus
11 April 2025
Hard

Bosnia and Herzegovina
2

			1	2	3
1	(Israel) (Bosnia and Herzegovina)	Maayan Laron; Sara Mikača	6^{4} 7^{7}	6; 4	6; 0
2	(Israel) (Bosnia and Herzegovina)	Mika Buchnik; Suana Tucaković	6; 3	1; 6	2; 6
3	(Israel) (Bosnia and Herzegovina)	Maayan Laron / Alian Zack; Tea Kovačević / Anita Wagner	6; 1	0; 6	11; 13

==== Bosnia and Herzegovina vs South Africa ====
Bosnia and Herzegovina
2
Herodotou Tennis Academy, Larnaca, Cyprus
12 April 2025
Hard

South Africa
0

			1	2	3
1	(Bosnia and Herzegovina) (South Africa)	Tea Kovačević; Kaitlyn Leigh Ramduth	6; 0	6; 2
2	(Bosnia and Herzegovina) (South Africa)	Suana Tucaković; Abigayel Vosloo	6; 2	6; 1
3	(Bosnia and Herzegovina) (South Africa)	Sara Mikača / Anita Wagner; Donna Le Roux / Jahnie Van Zyl				not played

=== 10th to 11th Play-Off ===
==== Estonia vs Kosovo ====
Estonia
2
Herodotou Tennis Academy, Larnaca, Cyprus
11 April 2025
Hard

Kosovo
0

			1	2	3
1	(Estonia) (Kosovo)	Valeria Gorlats; Adrijana Lekaj	6; 2	6; 2
2	(Estonia) (Kosovo)	Elena Malõgina; Forta Morina	6; 0	6; 1
3	(Estonia) (Kosovo)	Grete Gull / Kiira Pashkov; Aja Broqi / Adrijana Lekaj				not played

=== Promotions/Relegations ===
- Georgia and Norway were promoted to Europe/Africa Zone Group I in 2026.
- Estonia and Kosovo were relegated to Europe Zone Group III in 2026.

== Group III Europe ==
- Date: 16–22 June 2025
- Venue: Chișinău Arena Tennis Club, Chișinău, Moldova

Two-stage round robin, with three pools of four (Pools A, B, C) followed by the winners of each pool playing each other in a round robin to determine final rankings.

The top team will be promoted to Europe/Africa Group II in 2026, with no nations relegated.

=== Participating teams ===
- Albania

(Gresi Bajri, Kristal Dule, Enki Hyseni, Anatereza Guli,
Captain: Tedi Kaso)

- Andorra

(Victoria Jiménez Kasintseva, Laura Pichel Costa, Judit Cartaña Alaña, Maria Campaña Tomás,
Captain: Joan Jiménez Guerra)

- Armenia

(Alina Sogomonyan, Ani Amiraghyan, Aleksandra Korneeva, Naira Gevorgyan,
Captain: Gayane Movsisyan)

- Azerbaijan

(Michelle Dzjachangirova, Lala Eyvazova, Lamiya Huseyn,
Captain: Rauf Eyvazov)

- Finland

(Anastasia Kulikova, Laura Hietaranta, Clarissa Blomqvist, Ella Haavisto,
Captain: Kim Tiilikainen)

- Iceland

(Bryndís Rósa Armesto Nuevo, Anna Soffía Grönholm, Eygló Dís Armannsdóttir, Iva Jovisic,
Captain: Raj Kumar Bonifacius)

- Ireland

(Celine Simunyu, Sinéad Lohan, Breda Brennan, Anna Bowtell, Georgia Lily Lynn Browne,
Captain: John McGahon)

- Luxembourg

(Marie Weckerle, Eléonora Molinaro, Laura Palumbo, Onalee Wagner, Lucie Rabiot,
Captain: Claudine Schaul)

- Malta

(Helene Pellicano, Elaine Genovese, Emma Montebello, Cheyenne Borg,
Captain:Helen Asciak)

- Moldova

(Ecaterina Visnevscaia, Arina Gamretkaia, Abigail Rencheli, Daniela Ciobanu, Lia Belibova,
Captain: Olga Ćosić)

- Montenegro

(Tea Nikčević, Iva Lakić, Petra Mirković,
Captain: Miloš Karadžić)

- San Marino

(Silvia Alletti, Talita Giardi, Emma Pelliccioni,
Captain: Antoine Barbieri)

Inactive teams

- Belarus (suspended)
- Liechtenstein
- Russia (suspended)

=== Pool A ===
#	Team	P	W	L	Matches W-L	Sets W-L
1	Finland	3	3	0	8–0	16–0
2	Luxembourg	3	2	1	6–2	12–4
3	Montenegro	3	1	2	2–7	5–14
4	Iceland	3	0	3	1–8	2–17

=== Pool B ===
#	Team	P	W	L	Matches W-L	Sets W-L
1	Moldova	3	3	0	8–1	17–3
2	Ireland	3	2	1	7–2	14–5
3	Azerbaijan	3	1	2	2–6	5–13
4	Albania	3	0	3	0–8	1–16

=== Pool C ===
#	Team	P	W	L	Matches W-L	Sets W-L
1	Armenia	3	3	0	7–1	14–4
2	Malta	3	2	1	4–4	9–10
3	Andorra	3	1	2	4–5	9–10
4	San Marino	3	0	3	2–7	6–14

=== Promotion Play-Offs ===
#	Team	P	W	L	Matches W-L	Sets W-L
1	Finland	2	2	0	5–0	10–0
2	Moldova	2	1	1	2–2	4–4
3	Armenia	2	0	2	0–5	0–10

==== Armenia vs Finland ====
Armenia
0
Chișinău Arena Tennis Club, Chișinău, Moldova
19 June 2025
Hard

Finland
3

			1	2	3
1	(Armenia) (Finland)	Alina Sogomonyan; Laura Hietaranta	1; 6	0; 6
2	(Armenia) (Finland)	Ani Amiraghyan; Anastasia Kulikova	0; 6	0; 6
3	(Armenia) (Finland)	Alexandra Korneeva / Alina Sogomonyan; Clarissa Blomqvist / Laura Hietaranta	2; 6	2; 6

==== Armenia vs Moldova ====
Armenia
0
Chișinău Arena Tennis Club, Chișinău, Moldova
20 June 2025
Hard

Moldova
2

			1	2	3
1	(Armenia) (Moldova)	Alexandra Korneeva; Arina Gamretkaia	0; 6	1; 6
2	(Armenia) (Moldova)	Alina Sogomonyan; Abigail Rencheli	2; 6	3; 6
3	(Armenia) (Moldova)	Ani Amiraghyan / Alexandra Korneeva; Arina Gamretkaia / Abigail Rencheli				not played

==== Moldova vs Finland ====
Moldova
0
Chișinău Arena Tennis Club, Chișinău, Moldova
21 June 2025
Hard

Finland
2

			1	2	3
1	(Moldova) (Finland)	Arina Gamretkaia; Laura Hietaranta	5; 7	3; 6
2	(Moldova) (Finland)	Abigail Rencheli; Anastasia Kulikova	1; 6	4; 6
3	(Moldova) (Finland)	Arina Gamretkaia / Abigail Rencheli; Laura Hietaranta / Anastasia Kulikova				not played

=== Promotion ===
- Finland was promoted to Europe/Africa Zone Group II in 2026.

== Group III Africa ==
- Date: 4–10 August 2025
- Venue: Central Tennis Club, Windhoek, Namibia

Two-stage round robin, with three pools of four (Pools A, B, C) followed by the winners of each pool playing each other in a round robin to determine final rankings. The top team will be promoted to Europe/Africa Group II in 2026.

Nations finishing bottom of their pools (A4, B4, C4) also play each other in a round robin, with the team finishing bottom of that pool then being relegated to Africa Group IV next year.

=== Participating teams ===
- Algeria

(Bochra Rehab Mebaraki, Rawane Mebaraki, Melissa Rym Benamar Kerfah,
Captain: Aida Baira)

- Botswana

(Chelsea Chakanyuka, Ekua Youri, Naledi Raguin, Tshegofatso Tsiang)

- Burundi

(Safi Hategekimana, Ange Bebita Ishimwe, Yusra Irakoze,
Captain: Innocent Nshimirimana)

- Ghana

(Precious Nunana Okoh, Sisu-Makena Tomegah, Tracy Ampah, Linda Sedinam Henodzi)

- Kenya

(Stacy Chepkemei Yego, Angella Okutoyi, Alicia Owegi, Melissa Nanjala Mwakha, Cynthia Wanjala)

- Madagascar

(Iariniaina Tsantaniony, Elisoa Andriantefihasina, Miotisoa Rasendra Andrianantenaina, Randy Ikoriantsoa Rakotoarilala)

- Morocco

(Malak El Allami, Yasmine Kabbaj, Diae El Jardi, Manal Ennaciri,
Captain: Mehdi Ait)

- Namibia

(Liniques Theron, Kerstin Gressmann, Lisa Lia Yssel, Mari Vermeulen, Joanivia Bezuidenhout)

- Nigeria

(Barakat Oyinlomo Quadre, Ohunene Comfort Yakubu, Adesuwa Osabuohien, Success Ogunjobi, Khadijat Eleojo Mohammed,
Captain: Rotmi Akinloye)

- Tunisia

(Mouna Bouzgarrou, Lina Soussi, Ranim Rassil,
Captain: Lotfi Mornagui)

- Uganda

(Patience Athieno, Winnie Birungi, Abigail Nabasinga Mulungi, Maggie Flavia Namaganda)

- Zimbabwe

(Sasha Natalie Chimedza, Tadiwanashe Mauchi, Tsitsi Claire Mahere)

=== Pool A ===
#	Team	P	W	L	Matches W-L	Sets W-L
1	Morocco	3	3	0	9–0	18–0
2	Madagascar	3	2	1	5–4	10–9
3	Namibia	3	1	2	4–5	9–10
4	Burundi	3	0	3	0–9	0–18

=== Pool B ===
#	Team	P	W	L	Matches W-L	Sets W-L
1	Botswana	3	3	0	9–0	18–1
2	Nigeria	3	2	1	6–3	13–6
3	Ghana	3	1	2	3–6	6–12
4	Uganda	3	0	3	0–9	0–18

=== Pool C ===
#	Team	P	W	L	Matches W-L	Sets W-L
1	Kenya	3	3	0	8–1	17–2
2	Zimbabwe	3	2	1	6–3	12–8
3	Tunisia	3	1	2	4–5	9–10
4	Algeria	3	0	3	0–9	0–18

=== Promotion Play-Offs ===
#	Team	P	W	L	Matches W-L	Sets W-L
1	Morocco	2	2	0	5–1	10–5
2	Kenya	2	1	1	4–2	9–5
3	Botswana	2	0	2	0–6	3–12

=== Relegation Play-Offs ===
#	Team	P	W	L	Matches W-L	Sets W-L
1	Algeria	2	2	0	6–0	12–1
2	Burundi	2	1	1	2–4	4–9
3	Uganda	2	0	2	1–5	4–10

=== Promotion/Relegation ===
- Morocco was promoted to Europe/Africa Zone Group II in 2026.
- Uganda was relegated to Africa Zone Group IV in 2026.

== Group IV Africa ==
- Date: 14–20 July 2025
- Venue: Kicukiro Ecology Tennis Club, Kigali, Rwanda

Four round-robin pools, with three pools of three teams (Pool A, Pool B, Pool C) and one pool of four (Pool D). The winners of each pool then face each other in a promotional play-off semi-final (A1 v D1, B1 v C1), with the winners of those two matches competing for promotion to Africa Group III in 2026.

=== Participating teams ===
- Benin

(Gloriana Nahum, Stephanie N'tcha, Jessica Togbe, Mahugnon Eliaza Honfoga, Pascaline Vitou)

- Cameroon

(Karine Marion Job, Charnelle Fozo, Delisle Manantsop, Serene Orphelia Nguimbis Ntove,
Captain: Jean Bekale)

- Congo

(Theresia Amel Bankoussou, Marie-Noel Odongo, Armelia Bounzeki,
Captain: Alphonse Vianney)

- Ethiopia

(Shakira Varese, Samirawit Andarga Duche, Tigist Alemu Asha,
Captain: Zegeye Setegn)

- Lesotho

(Phtuthi Mohau Leshoele, Ntsoaki Mokhele, Makhauta Lizzy Mohanoe)

- Mozambique

(Siena Sousa Figueiredo, Jazara Kamea Bulha Alberto, Ilga Adolfo,
Captain: Ilga Adolfo)

- Rwanda

(Sonia Tuyishime, Olive Tuyisenge, Lia Kaishiki Mosimann, Giselle Umumararungu,
Captain: Sylvain Rutikanga)

- Senegal

(Lea Crosetti, Christel Fakhry, Seynabou Mendy)

- Seychelles

(Oceane Neskasis, Marie-May Isnard, Clyvie Delpech, Diandra Laporte, Fatime Kante)

- Sudan

(Walaa Elsir, Leena Abdalla, Hoida Mohamed)

- Tanzania

(Alesi Kazoba, Faith Njamakuya, Eunice Kimayo, Shana Martin Mao,
Captain: Nicolaus Jonas)

- Togo

(Ayawayi Dotse, Valentine Talaki, Ami Diwiniga Grace Dougah,
Captain: Alisama Agnamba)

Withdrawn

- Angola
- DR Congo
- Mauritius

=== Pool A ===
#	Team	P	W	L	Matches W-L	Sets W-L
1	Cameroon	3	3	0	8–1	16–3
2	Benin	3	2	1	7–2	15–4
3	Lesotho	3	1	2	2–7	4–14
4	Mozambique	3	0	3	1–8	2–16

=== Pool B ===
#	Team	P	W	L	Matches W-L	Sets W-L
1	Togo	3	3	0	9–0	18–0
2	Tanzania	3	2	1	4–5	8–10
3	Sudan	3	1	2	3–6	6–12
4	Seychelles	3	0	3	2–7	4–14

=== Pool C ===
#	Team	P	W	L	Matches W-L	Sets W-L
1	Rwanda	3	3	0	8–1	17–3
2	Senegal	3	2	1	7–2	15–5
3	Ethiopia	3	1	2	3–6	6–12
4	Congo	3	0	3	0–9	0–18

=== Promotion Play-Offs ===
#	Team	P	W	L	Matches W-L	Sets W-L
1	Cameroon	2	2	0	5–1	10–2
2	Togo	2	1	1	4–2	8–5
3	Rwanda	2	0	2	0–6	1–12

=== Promotion ===
- Cameroon was promoted to Africa Zone Group III in 2026.
