= 2024 Billie Jean King Cup =

International women's tennis competition

Details
- Duration: 12 April – 30 November 2024
- Edition: 61st

Achievements (singles)

The 2024 Billie Jean King Cup was the 61st edition of the Billie Jean King Cup, a tournament between national teams in women's tennis. Italy defeated Slovakia in the final. It was their fifth title, but first since 2013.

Myanmar, Northern Mariana Islands, Saint Lucia and Togo made their first appearances in the tournament.

== Billie Jean King Cup finals ==
Date: 14–20 November 2024
Venue: Martin Carpena Arena, Málaga, Spain
Surface: Hard indoor

12 nations take part in the Finals. The qualification is as follows:

- 2 finalists of the 2023 Finals (Canada and Italy)
- 1 host nation (Spain)
- 1 wild card (Czech Republic)
- 8 winners of the 2024 qualifying round

Participating teams
| Australia | Canada (TH) | Czech Republic (WC) | Germany | Great Britain | Italy (2023F) |
| Japan | Poland | Romania | Slovakia | Spain (H) | United States |

=== Seeds ===
1. Canada (quarterfinals)
2. Czech Republic (quarterfinals)
3. Italy (champions)
4. Australia (quarterfinals)

=== Draw ===
First round
Germany | 0
Great Britain | 2
Slovakia | 2
United States | 1
Spain | 0
Poland | 2
Japan | 2
Romania | 1

Quarter-finals
1 | Canada | 0
Great Britain | 2
4 | Australia | 0
Slovakia | 2
Poland | 2
2 | Czech Republic | 1
Japan | 1
3 | Italy | 2

Semi-finals
Great Britain | 1
Slovakia | 2
Poland | 1
3 | Italy | 2

Final
Slovakia | 0
3 | Italy | 2

=== Qualifying round ===
Date: 12–13 April 2024

Sixteen teams played for eight spots in the Finals, in series decided on a home and away basis.

These sixteen teams were:

- 8 teams ranked 2nd–12th in the 2023 Finals
- 8 winning teams from the 2023 play-offs

The eight winning teams from the qualifying round will play at the Finals and the eight losing teams will play at the 2024 play-offs.

#: Nations Ranking as of 15 November 2023.

Qualified teams

| Seeded teams: 1. Australia (#2); 2. Switzerland (#3); 3. France (#6); 4. United States (#8); 5. Kazakhstan (#9); 6. Germany (#10); 7. Slovakia (#11); 8. Romania (#12) | Unseeded teams: Belgium (#13); Slovenia (#14); Great Britain (#15); Brazil (#16); Poland (#17); Ukraine (#18); Mexico (#19); Japan (#20) |

| Home team | Score | Away team | Location | Venue | Surface |
|---|---|---|---|---|---|
| Australia [1] | 4–0 | Mexico | Brisbane | Pat Rafter Arena | Hard |
| Switzerland [2] | 0–4 | Poland | Biel/Bienne | Swiss Tennis Arena | Hard (i) |
| France [3] | 1–3 | Great Britain | Le Portel | Le Chaudron | Clay (i) |
| United States [4] | 4–0 | Belgium | Orlando | USTA National Campus | Hard |
| Japan | 3–1 | Kazakhstan [5] | Tokyo | Ariake Coliseum | Hard (i) |
| Brazil | 1–3 | Germany [6] | São Paulo | Ginásio do Ibirapuera | Clay (i) |
| Slovakia [7] | 4–0 | Slovenia | Bratislava | NTC Arena | Hard (i) |
| Ukraine | 2–3 | Romania [8] | Fernandina Beach (USA) | Racquet Park Drive | Clay (green) |

== Billie Jean King Cup play-offs ==
Date: 15–17 November 2024

Sixteen teams will play for eight spots in the 2025 qualifying round, in series decided on a home and away basis.

These sixteen teams are:

- 8 losing teams from the qualifying round, in April 2024
- 8 winning teams from their Group I zone

Eight winners will advance to the 2025 qualifying round while losers will contest in their respective regional Group I event in 2025.

Teams from qualifying round

- Switzerland (#7)
- Kazakhstan (#13)
- France (#14)
- Slovenia (#16)
- Belgium (#17)
- Ukraine (#18)
- Brazil (#19)
- Mexico (#20)

Teams from Group I

- Netherlands (#21)
- Argentina (#22)
- China (#23)
- Austria (#24)
- Colombia (#25)
- Serbia (#26)
- South Korea (#32)
- Denmark (#33)

| Home team | Score | Away team | Location | Venue | Surface |
|---|---|---|---|---|---|
| Switzerland [1] | 4–0 | Serbia | Biel/Bienne | Swiss Tennis Arena | Hard (i) |
| Kazakhstan [2] | 3–1 | South Korea | Astana | National Tennis Center (Beeline Arena) | Hard (i) |
| Colombia | 3–2 | France [3] | Bogotá | Hatogrande Country Club | Clay |
| Slovenia [4] | 1–3 | Netherlands | Velenje | Bela dvorana Velenje | Clay (i) |
| China | 3–2 | Belgium [5] | Guangzhou | Guangzhou Nansha International Tennis Center | Hard |
| Ukraine [6] | 3–2 | Austria | McKinney (USA) | The Courts McKinney | Hard (i) |
| Brazil [7] | 3–2 | Argentina | São Paulo | Ginásio Ibirapuera | Clay (i) |
| Denmark | 3–2 | Mexico [8] | Farum | Farum Arena | Hard (i) |

== Americas Zone ==
=== Group I ===
Date: 8–13 April
Venue: Club Los Lagartos, Bogotá, Colombia (Clay)

Participating teams

- Argentina
- Chile
- Colombia
- Ecuador
- Peru
- Venezuela

==== Promotions/Relegations ====
- Colombia and Argentina were promoted to the 2024 Billie Jean King Cup play-offs.
- Peru and Ecuador were relegated to Americas Zone Group II in 2025.

=== Group II ===
Date: 22–27 July
Venue: Centro Nacional de Tenis, Santo Domingo Este, Dominican Republic (Hard)

Participating teams

- Bolivia
- Cuba
- Dominican Republic
- Guatemala
- Honduras
- Paraguay
- Puerto Rico
- Uruguay

==== Promotions/Relegations ====
- Guatemala and Paraguay were promoted to Americas Zone Group I in 2025.
- Cuba and Uruguay were relegated to Americas Zone Group III in 2025.

=== Group III ===
Date: 5-10 August
Venue: National Racquet Centre, Tacarigua, Trinidad and Tobago (Hard)

Participating teams

- Antigua and Barbuda
- Aruba
- Bahamas
- Barbados
- Bermuda
- Costa Rica
- El Salvador
- Jamaica
- Saint Lucia
- Trinidad and Tobago

Withdrawn

- Panama
- U.S. Virgin Islands

Inactive teams

- Eastern Caribbean
- Haiti

==== Promotions ====
- Barbados and Costa Rica were promoted to Americas Zone Group II in 2025.

== Asia/Oceania Zone ==
=== Group I ===
Date: 8–13 April
Venue: Moon Island Clay Park, Changsha, China (Clay)

Participating teams

- China
- Chinese Taipei
- India
- New Zealand
- Pacific Oceania
- South Korea

==== Promotions/Relegations ====
- China and South Korea were promoted to the 2024 Billie Jean King Cup play-offs.
- Chinese Taipei and Pacific Oceania were relegated to Asia/Oceania Zone Group II in 2025.

=== Group II ===
Date: 15–20 July
Venue: National Tennis Centre, Kuala Lumpur, Malaysia (Hard)

Participating teams

- Hong Kong
- Indonesia
- Iran
- Kyrgyzstan
- Malaysia
- Mongolia
- Pakistan
- Singapore
- Sri Lanka
- Thailand
- Uzbekistan

==== Promotions/Relegations ====
- Hong Kong and Thailand were promoted to Asia/Oceania Zone Group I in 2025.
- Pakistan and Sri Lanka were relegated to Asia/Oceania Zone Group III in 2025.

=== Group III ===
Date: 25–30 November
Venue: Bahrain Tennis Club, Manama, Bahrain

Participating teams

- Bahrain
- Bhutan
- Brunei
- Guam
- Iraq
- Laos
- Macau
- Maldives
- Myanmar
- Nepal
- Northern Mariana Islands
- Philippines
- Qatar
- Saudi Arabia
- Tajikistan
- Turkmenistan
- Vietnam

Inactive teams

- Bangladesh
- Jordan
- Lebanon
- Oman
- Syria

==== Promotions ====
- Northern Mariana Islands and Philippines were promoted to Asia/Oceania Zone Group II in 2025.

== Europe/Africa Zone ==
=== Group I ===
Date: 8–13 April
Venue: Complexo de tenis do Jamor, Oeiras, Portugal (Clay)

Participating teams

- Austria
- Bulgaria
- Denmark
- Greece
- Hungary
- Latvia
- Netherlands
- Norway
- Portugal
- Serbia
- Sweden
- Turkey

Promotions/Relegations

- Netherlands, Austria, Serbia and Denmark advanced to the 2024 Billie Jean King Cup play-offs.
- Bulgaria and Norway were relegated to Europe/Africa Zone Group II in 2025.

=== Group II ===
Date: 8–13 April
Venue: SEB Arena, Vilnius, Lithuania (Hard)

Participating teams

- Bosnia and Herzegovina
- Croatia
- Egypt
- Estonia
- Georgia
- Israel
- Kosovo
- Lithuania
- Malta
- Morocco
- North Macedonia

Promotions/Relegations

- Croatia and Lithuania were promoted to Europe/Africa Zone Group I in 2025.
- Morocco and Malta were respectively relegated to Africa Zone Group III and Europe Zone Group III in 2025.

=== Group III Europe ===
Date: 17–22 June
Venue: Chișinău Arena Tennis Club, Chișinău, Moldova (Hard)

Participating teams

- Albania
- Armenia
- Azerbaijan
- Cyprus
- Finland
- Iceland
- Ireland
- Luxembourg
- Moldova
- Montenegro
- San Marino

Inactive teams

- Belarus (suspended)
- Liechtenstein
- Russia (suspended)

==== Promotion ====
- Cyprus was promoted to Europe/Africa Zone Group II in 2025.

=== Group III Africa ===
Date: 10–15 June
Venue: Nairobi Club, Nairobi, Kenya (Clay)

Participating teams

- Botswana
- Burundi
- Ghana
- Kenya
- Madagascar
- Mauritius
- Namibia
- Nigeria
- South Africa
- Tunisia
- Uganda
- Zimbabwe

==== Promotion/Relegation ====
- South Africa was promoted to Europe/Africa Zone Group II in 2025.
- Mauritius was relegated to Africa Zone Group IV in 2025.

=== Group IV Africa ===
Date: 10–15 June
Venue: Ecology Club Kigali, Kigali, Rwanda (Clay)

Participating teams

- Algeria
- Angola
- Cameroon
- DR Congo
- Ethiopia
- Lesotho
- Mozambique
- Rwanda
- Tanzania
- Togo

Withdrawn

- Congo
- Senegal
- Seychelles

==== Promotion ====
- Algeria was promoted to Africa Zone Group III in 2025.
