= 2026 Billie Jean King Cup =

International women's tennis competition

Details
- Duration: 6 April – 22 November 2026
- Edition: 63rd

Achievements (singles)

The 2026 Billie Jean King Cup was the 63rd edition of the Billie Jean King Cup, a tournament between national teams in women's tennis.
Czech Republic defeated Ukraine 2–0 in the final and won their twelfth title. Italy was the two-time defending champion, but lost to Ukraine in the semifinals.

Ivory Coast, Kuwait, and Zambia made their first appearances in the tournament.

== Billie Jean King Cup finals ==
Date: 22–27 September 2026
Venue: Shenzhen Bay Sports Center, Shenzhen, China
Surface: Hard indoor

Eight nations will take part in the finals. The qualification is as follows:

- 7 qualifying round winners
- 1 host nation (China)

Participating teams
Belgium	China (H)	Czech Republic	Great Britain
Italy	Kazakhstan	Spain	Ukraine

=== Seeds ===
1. Italy (semifinals)
2. Great Britain (quarterfinals)
3. Ukraine (final)
4. Spain (semifinals)

=== Draw ===
Quarterfinals
1	Italy	2
China	1
3	Ukraine	2
Belgium	1
Kazakhstan	1
4	Spain	2
Czech Republic	2
2	Great Britain	0

Semifinals
1	Italy	0
3	Ukraine	2
4	Spain	0
Czech Republic	2

Final
3	Ukraine	0
Czech Republic	2

=== Qualifying round ===
Date: 10–11 April 2026

Fourteen teams are playing for seven spots in the Finals, in series decided on a home and away basis. This year Billie Jean King Cup qualifying returns to home and away basis, with doubles rubber moved to the third game, coinciding with Davis Cup.

These fourteen teams were:

- 7 teams of the 2025 Finals, except the hosts, China.
- 7 winning teams from the 2025 play-offs.

The seven winning teams from the qualifying round will play at the finals, and the seven losing teams will play at the 2026 play-offs.

#: Nations Ranking as of 17 November 2025.

Qualified teams

Seeded teams

- Italy (#1)
- United States (#2)
- Great Britain (#3)
- Canada (#4)
- Spain (#5)
- Czech Republic (#6)
- Poland (#7)

Unseeded teams

- Ukraine (#8)
- Kazakhstan (#9)
- Japan (#10)
- Australia (#12)
- Switzerland (#13)
- Belgium (#17)
- Slovenia (#18)

Home team	Score	Away team	Location	Venue	Surface
Italy [1]	3–1	Japan	Velletri	ASD Colle degli Dei	Clay
Belgium	3–1	United States [2]	Ostend	COREtec Dôme	Clay (i)
Australia	1–3	Great Britain [3]	Melbourne	John Cain Arena	Hard
Kazakhstan	3–1	Canada [4]	Astana	Beeline Arena	Clay (i)
Slovenia	1–3	Spain [5]	Portorož	Tennis Center Portorož	Clay
Switzerland	2–3	Czech Republic [6]	Biel/Bienne	Swiss Tennis Arena	Hard (i)
Poland [7]	0–4	Ukraine	Gliwice	PreZero Arena	Clay (i)

== Billie Jean King Cup play-offs ==
Date: 20–22 November 2026

Fourteen teams played for seven spots in the 2027 qualifying round, in series decided on a home and away basis.

These fourteen teams were:

- 7 losing teams from the qualifying round, in April 2026
- 7 winning teams from their Group I zone

Seven winners advanced to the 2027 qualifying round, while losers will compete in their respective regional Group I events in 2027.

#: Nations Ranking as of 13 April 2026.

Teams from qualifying round

- United States (#6)
- Canada (#8)
- Poland (#9)
- Japan (#10)
- Australia (#14)
- Switzerland (#16)
- Slovenia (#18)

Teams from Group I zones

- Brazil (#19)
- Argentina (#21)
- France (#24)
- Sweden (=#26)
- Thailand (=#26)
- Indonesia (#32)
- Hungary (#33)

Home team	Score	Away team	Location	Venue	Surface
United States [1]	4–0	Hungary	Delray Beach	Delray Beach Tennis Center	Hard
Brazil	3–2	Canada [2]	Vitória	Shopping Vitória	Clay
Poland [3]	3–2	Sweden	Włocławek	Hala Mistrzów	Hard (i)
Japan [4]	4–0	Argentina	Tokyo	Ariake Coliseum	Hard (i)
France	0–4	Australia [5]	Le Portel	Le Chaudron	Clay (i)
Thailand	3–1	Switzerland [6]	Nonthaburi	The National Tennis Development Center	Hard
Slovenia [7]	4–0	Indonesia	Velenje	Bela dvorana	Clay (i)

== Americas Zone ==
=== Group I ===
Date: 8–11 April 2026
Venue: Deportivo de Ibagué, Ibagué, Colombia (Clay)

Participating teams

- Argentina
- Brazil
- Chile
- Colombia
- Ecuador
- Mexico
- Peru
- Venezuela

==== Promotions/Relegations ====
- Argentina and Brazil advanced to the 2026 Billie Jean King Cup play-offs.
- Colombia and Venezuela were relegated to Americas Zone Group II in 2027.

=== Group II ===
Date: 1–4 July 2026
Venue: Rakiura Resort, Luque, Paraguay

Participating teams

- Bolivia
- Dominican Republic
- Guatemala
- Honduras
- Paraguay
- Puerto Rico
- Uruguay

Withdrawn

- Bahamas

==== Promotions/Relegations ====
- Guatemala and Paraguay were promoted to Americas Zone Group I in 2027.
- Puerto Rico and Uruguay were relegated to Americas Zone Group III in 2027.

=== Group III ===
Date: 15–20 June 2026
Venue: Federación Salvadoreña de Tenis, Santa Tecla, El Salvador (Hard)

Participating teams

- Antigua and Barbuda
- Barbados
- Bermuda
- Costa Rica
- Cuba
- El Salvador
- Jamaica
- Panama
- Suriname
- Trinidad and Tobago

Withdrawn

- Saint Lucia
- U.S. Virgin Islands

Inactive teams

- Aruba
- Eastern Caribbean
- Haiti

==== Promotions ====
- Costa Rica and Trinidad and Tobago were promoted to Americas Zone Group II in 2027.

== Asia/Oceania Zone ==
=== Group I ===
Date: 7–11 April 2026
Venue: DLTA School of Tennis, New Delhi, India (Hard)

Participating teams

- India
- Indonesia
- Mongolia
- New Zealand
- South Korea
- Thailand

==== Promotions/Relegations ====
- Indonesia and Thailand advanced to the 2026 Billie Jean King Cup play-offs.
- Mongolia and New Zealand were relegated to Asia/Oceania Zone Group II in 2027.

=== Group II ===
Date: 15–20 June 2026
Venue: National Tennis Centre, Kuala Lumpur, Malaysia (Hard)

Participating teams

- Chinese Taipei
- Hong Kong
- Kyrgyzstan
- Laos
- Malaysia
- Pacific Oceania
- Philippines
- Singapore
- Sri Lanka
- Uzbekistan

==== Promotions/Relegations ====
- Hong Kong and Philippines were promoted to Asia/Oceania Zone Group I in 2027.
- Kyrgyzstan and Laos were relegated to Asia/Oceania Zone Group III in 2027.

=== Group III ===
Date: 21–25 October 2026
Venue:
Zone A: NovaWorld International Tennis Complex, Lam Dong, Phan Thiết, Vietnam (Hard)
Zone B: PTF-SDA Tennis Complex, Islamabad, Pakistan (Hard)

Participating teams

Zone A:

- Brunei
- Iraq
- Nepal
- Northern Mariana Islands
- Saudi Arabia
- Tajikistan
- Turkmenistan
- Vietnam

Zone B:

- Bahrain
- Bhutan
- Iran
- Jordan
- Kuwait
- Maldives
- Pakistan
- Qatar

Withdrawn

- Guam
- Myanmar

Inactive teams

- Bangladesh
- Lebanon
- Macau
- Oman
- Syria

==== Promotions ====
- Iran and Vietnam were promoted to Asia/Oceania Zone Group II in 2027.

== Europe/Africa Zone ==
=== Group I ===
Date: 7–11 April 2026
Venue: Complexo de Ténis do Jamor, Oeiras, Portugal (Clay)

Participating teams

- Croatia
- Denmark
- France
- Georgia
- Germany
- Hungary
- Latvia
- Lithuania
- Netherlands
- Norway
- Portugal
- Romania
- Serbia
- Slovakia
- Sweden
- Turkey

==== Promotions/Relegations ====
- France, Hungary and Sweden advanced to the 2026 Billie Jean King Cup play-offs.
- Denmark, Georgia, Germany and Norway were relegated to Europe/Africa Zone Group II in 2027.

=== Group II ===
Date: 6–11 April 2026
Venue: Tennis Association RS, Banja Luka, Bosnia and Herzegovina (Clay)

Participating teams

- Austria
- Bosnia and Herzegovina
- Bulgaria
- Cyprus
- Egypt
- Finland
- Greece
- Morocco
- North Macedonia
- South Africa

Withdrawn

- Israel

==== Promotions/Relegations ====
- Bulgaria and Greece were promoted to Europe/Africa Zone Group I in 2027.
- Austria, Bosnia and Herzegovina and North Macedonia were relegated to Europe Zone Group III in 2027.
- Egypt was relegated to Africa Zone Group III in 2027.

=== Group III Europe ===
Date: 15–20 June 2026
Venue: Centro Tennis Cassa di Risparmio, San Marino, San Marino (Clay)

Participating teams

- Albania
- Andorra
- Armenia
- Azerbaijan
- Estonia
- Iceland
- Ireland
- Kosovo
- Luxembourg
- Malta
- Moldova
- Montenegro
- San Marino

Inactive teams

- Belarus (suspended)
- Liechtenstein
- Russia (suspended)

==== Promotions ====
- Armenia and Moldova were promoted to Europe/Africa Zone Group II in 2027.

=== Group III Africa ===
Date: 13–18 July 2026
Venue: National Tennis Center, Gaborone, Botswana (Hard)

Participating teams

- Algeria
- Botswana
- Burundi
- Cameroon
- Ghana
- Kenya
- Madagascar
- Namibia
- Nigeria
- Tunisia
- Zimbabwe

==== Promotions/Relegations ====
- Botswana and Nigeria were promoted to Europe/Africa Zone Group II in 2027.
- Burundi and Kenya were relegated to Africa Zone Group IV in 2027.

=== Group IV Africa ===
Date: 12–15 August 2026
Venue: Le Central Tennis Club, Abidjan, Ivory Coast (Hard)

Participating teams

- Benin
- Congo
- DR Congo
- Ethiopia
- Ivory Coast
- Lesotho
- Mozambique
- Rwanda
- Seychelles
- Tanzania
- Togo
- Zambia

Withdrawn

- Senegal
- Sudan
- Uganda

Inactive teams

- Angola
- Mauritius

==== Promotions ====
- Benin and Togo were promoted to Africa Zone Group III in 2027.
