= 2025 Billie Jean King Cup =

International women's tennis competition

Details
- Duration: 7 April – 16 November 2025
- Edition: 62nd

Achievements (singles)

The 2025 Billie Jean King Cup was the 62nd edition of the Billie Jean King Cup, a tournament between national teams in women's tennis.
Defending champions Italy defeated United States 2-0 in the final.

Andorra, Benin, Sudan and Suriname made their first appearances in the tournament.

== Billie Jean King Cup finals ==
Date: 16–21 September 2025
Venue: Shenzhen Bay Sports Center, Shenzhen, China
Surface: Hard indoor

Eight nations played in the Finals. The qualification was as follows:

- 6 qualifying round group winners
- 1 defending champion (Italy)
- 1 host nation (China)

Participating teams
China (H)	Great Britain	Italy (TH)	Japan
Kazakhstan	Spain	Ukraine	United States

=== Seeds ===
1. Italy (champions)
2. Great Britain (semifinals)
3. United States (finals)
4. Spain (quarterfinals)

=== Draw ===
Quarterfinals
1	Italy	2
China	0
4	Spain	0
Ukraine	2
Kazakhstan	1
3	United States	2
Japan	0
2	Great Britain	2

Semifinals
1	Italy	2
Ukraine	1
3	United States	2
2	Great Britain	0

Final
1	Italy	2
3	United States	0

=== Qualifying round ===
Date: 10–13 April 2025
Format: Round-robin - 6 groups (A–F) of 3 teams

G	Host	Location	Venue	Surface
A	Japan	Tokyo	Ariake Coliseum	Hard (i)
B	Czech Republic	Ostrava	RT Torax Arena	Hard (i)
C	Slovakia	Bratislava	Peugeot Arena	Hard (i)
D	Australia	Brisbane	Pat Rafter Arena	Hard
E	Poland	Radom	Radomskie Centrum Sportu	Clay (i)
F	Netherlands	The Hague	Sportcampus Zuiderpark	Clay (i)

Eighteen teams played for six spots in the Finals.

These eighteen teams were:

- 11 teams from the 2024 Finals
- 7 winning teams from the 2024 play-offs (China as a host automatically qualified for the Finals)

Losing teams played at the 2025 play-offs.

#: Nations Ranking as of 3 December 2024.

Teams from Finals

- Canada (#2)
- Czech Republic (#3)
- Slovakia (#4)
- Australia (#5)
- Poland (#6)
- Great Britain (#7)
- United States (#9)
- Spain (#10)
- Germany (#11)
- Romania (#13)
- Japan (#14)

Teams from Play-offs

- Switzerland (#8)
- Kazakhstan (#12)
- Netherlands (#17)
- Ukraine (#19)
- Brazil (#20)
- Colombia (#24)
- Denmark (#27)

==== Results ====
G = Group, T = Ties, M = Matches, S = Sets, (H) = Hosts

G	Winner				Runner-up				Third			
G	Country	T	M	S	Country	T	M	S	Country	T	M	S
A	Japan (H)	2–0	5–1	11–4	Canada [1]	1–1	4–2	9–5	Romania	0–2	0–6	1–12
B	Spain	2–0	5–1	10–3	Czech Republic [2] (H)	1–1	3–3	6–6	Brazil	0–2	1–5	3–10
C	United States	2–0	5–1	10–2	Slovakia [3] (H)	1–1	4–2	8–6	Denmark	0–2	0–6	2–12
D	Kazakhstan	2–0	5–1	10–3	Australia [4] (H)	1–1	4–2	8–4	Colombia	0–2	0–6	1–12
E	Ukraine	2–0	5–1	10–3	Poland [5] (H)	1–1	3–3	6–8	Switzerland	0–2	1–5	5–10
F	Great Britain [6]	2–0	4–2	8–6	Netherlands (H)	1–1	4–2	9–5	Germany	0–2	1–5	4–10

== Billie Jean King Cup play-offs ==
Date: 14-16 November 2025
Format: Round-robin - 7 groups (A–G) of 3 teams

G	Host	Location	Venue	Surface
A	Mexico	Monterrey	Club Sonoma	Hard
B	Poland	Gorzów Wielkopolski	Arena Gorzów	Hard (i)
C	Argentina	Córdoba	Córdoba Lawn Tennis Club	Clay
D	Croatia	Varaždin	Arena Varaždin	Hard (i)
E	Australia	Hobart	Domain Tennis Centre	Hard
F	Germany	Ismaning	Tennis Club Ismaning	Hard (i)
G	India	Bengaluru	S M Krishna Tennis Stadium	Hard

Twenty-one teams played for seven spots in the 2026 qualifying round.

These twenty-one teams were:

- Twelve losing teams from the qualifying round, in April 2025
- Nine winning teams from their Group I zone.

Losers contest in their respective regional Group I event in 2026.

#: Nations Ranking as of 14 April 2025.

Teams from qualifying round

- Canada (#5)
- Poland (#8)
- Slovakia (#9)
- Czech Republic (#10)
- Australia (#12)
- Germany (#13)
- Netherlands (#14)
- Romania (#15)
- Switzerland (#16)
- Brazil (#21)
- Colombia (#23)
- Denmark (#26)

Teams from Group I zones

- Belgium (#18)
- Slovenia (#19)
- Mexico (#20)
- Argentina (#24)
- Turkey (#25)
- India (#27)
- Croatia (#28)
- Portugal (#30)
- New Zealand (#31)

=== Results ===
2026 Qualifying round
2026 Regional Group I event

G = Group, T = Ties, M = Matches, S = Sets, (H) = Hosts

G	Winner				Runner-up				Third			
G	Country	T	M	S	Country	T	M	S	Country	T	M	S
A	Canada [1]	2–0	4–1	9–2	Mexico (H)	1–1	2–3	4–7	Denmark	0–2	2–4	5–9
B	Poland [2] (H)	2–0	6–0	12–0	Romania	1–1	3–3	6–8	New Zealand	0–2	0–6	2–12
C	Switzerland	2–0	4–2	8–4	Argentina (H)	1–1	4–2	8–5	Slovakia [3]	0–2	1–5	3–10
D	Czech Republic [4]	2–0	5–1	10–3	Croatia (H)	1–1	3–3	7–6	Colombia	0–2	1–5	2–10
E	Australia [5] (H)	2–0	5–0	10–2	Brazil	1–1	3–2	8–5	Portugal	0–2	0–6	1–12
F	Belgium	2–0	4–1	8–4	Turkey	1–1	3–3	7–8	Germany [6] (H)	0–2	1–4	5–8
G	Slovenia	2–0	4–2	9–6	Netherlands [7]	1–1	4–2	9–4	India (H)	0–2	1–5	3–11

For the first time since the introduction of regional group in 1992, Germany was relegated to regional group.

== Americas Zone ==
=== Group I ===
Date: 8–12 April 2025
Venue: Mouratoglou Tennis Center, Guadalajara, Mexico (Hard)

Participating teams

- Argentina
- Chile
- Guatemala
- Mexico
- Paraguay
- Venezuela

==== Promotions/Relegations ====
- Argentina and Mexico were promoted to the 2025 Billie Jean King Cup play-offs.
- Guatemala and Paraguay were relegated to Americas Zone Group II in 2026.

=== Group II ===
Date: 18–21 June 2025
Venue: Club Lawn Tennis de la Exposición, Lima, Peru (Clay)

Participating teams

- Barbados
- Bolivia
- Costa Rica
- Dominican Republic
- Ecuador
- Honduras
- Peru
- Puerto Rico

==== Promotions/Relegations ====
- Ecuador and Peru were promoted to Americas Zone Group I in 2026.
- Barbados and Costa Rica were relegated to Americas Zone Group III in 2026.

=== Group III ===
Date: 18–23 August 2025
Venue: Federacion Salvadorena de Tenis, Santa Tecla, El Salvador (Hard)

Participating teams

- Antigua and Barbuda
- Bahamas
- Cuba
- El Salvador
- Jamaica
- Panama
- Saint Lucia
- Suriname
- Trinidad and Tobago
- Uruguay
- U.S. Virgin Islands

Withdrawn

- Aruba
- Bermuda

Inactive teams

- Eastern Caribbean
- Haiti

==== Promotions ====
- Bahamas and Uruguay were promoted to Americas Zone Group II in 2026.

== Asia/Oceania Zone ==
=== Group I ===
Date: 8–12 April 2025
Venue: MSLTA School of Tennis, Pune, India (Hard)

Participating teams

- Chinese Taipei
- Hong Kong
- India
- New Zealand
- South Korea
- Thailand

==== Promotions/Relegations ====
- India and New Zealand were promoted to the 2025 Billie Jean King Cup play-offs.
- Chinese Taipei and Hong Kong were relegated to Asia/Oceania Zone Group II in 2026.

=== Group II ===
Date: 16–22 June 2025
Venue: National Tennis Centre, Kuala Lumpur, Malaysia (Hard)

Participating teams

- Indonesia
- Iran
- Kyrgyzstan
- Malaysia
- Mongolia
- Northern Mariana Islands
- Pacific Oceania
- Philippines
- Singapore
- Uzbekistan

==== Promotions/Relegations ====
- Indonesia and Mongolia were promoted to Asia/Oceania Zone Group I in 2026.
- Iran and Northern Mariana Islands were relegated to Asia/Oceania Zone Group III in 2026.

=== Group III ===
Date: Event A: 16–21 June 2025; Event B: 10–15 November 2025
Venue: Event A: Sri Lanka Tennis Association, Colombo, Sri Lanka (Clay); Event B: NovaWorld Tennis Gardens, Phan Thiet, Vietnam (Hard)

Participating teams

Event A:

- Myanmar
- Nepal
- Pakistan
- Qatar
- Sri Lanka
- Tajikistan
- Turkmenistan

Event B:

- Bahrain
- Brunei
- Guam
- Jordan
- Laos
- Maldives
- Vietnam

Withdrawn

- Bhutan
- Iraq
- Macau
- Saudi Arabia

Inactive teams

- Bangladesh
- Lebanon
- Oman
- Syria

==== Promotions ====
- Laos and Sri Lanka were promoted to Asia/Oceania Zone Group II in 2026.

== Europe/Africa Zone ==
=== Group I ===
Date: 8–12 April 2025
Venue: SEB Arena, Vilnius, Lithuania (Hard)

Participating teams

- Austria
- Belgium
- Croatia
- France
- Greece
- Hungary
- Latvia
- Lithuania
- Portugal
- Serbia
- Slovenia
- Sweden
- Turkey

==== Promotions/Relegations ====
- Belgium, Croatia, Portugal and Turkey advanced to the 2025 Billie Jean King Cup play-offs, while Slovenia was later promoted as the highest ranked non-promoted team in each 2025 Regional Group I event.
- Austria and Greece were relegated to Europe/Africa Zone Group II in 2026.

=== Group II ===
Date: 7–12 April 2025
Venue: Herodotou Tennis Academy, Larnaca, Cyprus (Hard)

Participating teams

- Bosnia and Herzegovina
- Bulgaria
- Cyprus
- Egypt
- Estonia
- Georgia
- Israel
- Kosovo
- North Macedonia
- Norway
- South Africa

==== Promotions/Relegations ====
- Georgia and Norway were promoted to Europe/Africa Zone Group I in 2026.
- Estonia and Kosovo were relegated to Europe Zone Group III in 2026.

=== Group III Europe ===
Date: 16–22 June 2025
Venue: Chișinău Arena Tennis Club, Chișinău, Moldova (Hard)

Participating teams

- Albania
- Andorra
- Armenia
- Azerbaijan
- Finland
- Iceland
- Ireland
- Luxembourg
- Malta
- Moldova
- Montenegro
- San Marino

Inactive teams

- Belarus (suspended)
- Liechtenstein
- Russia (suspended)

==== Promotion ====
- Finland was promoted to Europe/Africa Zone Group II in 2026.

=== Group III Africa ===
Date: 4–10 August 2025
Venue: Central Tennis Club, Windhoek, Namibia (Hard)

Participating teams

- Algeria
- Botswana
- Burundi
- Ghana
- Kenya
- Madagascar
- Morocco
- Namibia
- Nigeria
- Tunisia
- Uganda
- Zimbabwe

==== Promotion/Relegation ====
- Morocco was promoted to Europe/Africa Zone Group II in 2026.
- Uganda was relegated to Africa Zone Group IV in 2026.

=== Group IV Africa ===
Date: 14–20 July 2025
Venue: Kicukiro Ecology Tennis Club, Kigali, Rwanda (Clay)

Participating teams

- Benin
- Cameroon
- Congo
- Ethiopia
- Lesotho
- Mozambique
- Rwanda
- Senegal
- Seychelles
- Sudan
- Tanzania
- Togo

Withdrawn

- Angola
- DR Congo
- Mauritius

==== Promotion ====
- Cameroon was promoted to Africa Zone Group III in 2026.
