= 2017 Fed Cup Europe/Africa Zone Group III – play-offs =

Subsection of tennis competition

The play-offs of the 2017 Fed Cup Europe/Africa Zone Group III were the final stages of the Group III zonal competition involving teams from Europe and Africa. Using the positions determined in their pools, the fifteen teams faced off to determine their placing in the 2017 Fed Cup Europe/Africa Zone Group III. The top two teams advanced to Fed Cup Europe/Africa Zone Group II.

Placing	Pool A	Pool B	Pool C	Pool D
1	Greece	Cyprus	Finland	Moldova
2	Malta	Ireland	Tunisia	Morocco
3	Armenia	Kenya	Macedonia	Algeria
4	—N/a	Iceland	Cameroon	Mozambique

== Promotional play-offs ==
The first placed teams of each pool were drawn in head-to-head rounds. The winners advanced to Group II in 2018.

=== Greece vs. Finland ===
Greece
2
National Tennis School & Tennis Club Acvila, Chișinău, Moldova
17 June 2017
Clay

Finland
0

			1	2	3
1	(Greece) (Finland)	Eleni Kordolaimi; Oona Orpana	6; 0	6; 4
2	(Greece) (Finland)	Valentini Grammatikopoulou; Piia Suomalainen	7; 5	6; 1
3	(Greece) (Finland)	Valentini Grammatikopoulou / Eleni Kordolaimi; Emma Laine / Piia Suomalainen				not played

=== Cyprus vs. Moldova ===
Cyprus
0
National Tennis School & Tennis Club Acvila, Chișinău, Moldova
17 June 2017
Clay

Moldova
2

			1	2	3
1	(Cyprus) (Moldova)	Eliza Omirou; Vitalia Stamat	2; 6	7^{8} 6^{6}	4; 6
2	(Cyprus) (Moldova)	Eleni Louka; Alexandra Perper	0; 6	2; 6
3	(Cyprus) (Moldova)	Eliza Omirou / Maria Siopacha; Alexandra Perper / Gabriela Porubin				not played

== 5th to 8th play-offs ==
The second placed teams of each pool were drawn in head-to-head rounds to find the equal fifth and seventh placed teams.

=== Malta vs. Tunisia ===
Malta
2
National Tennis School & Tennis Club Acvila, Chișinău, Moldova
17 June 2017
Clay

Tunisia
1

			1	2	3
1	(Malta) (Tunisia)	Helene Pellicano; Mouna Bouzgarrou	6; 1	6; 4
2	(Malta) (Tunisia)	Elaine Genovese; Chiraz Bechri	3; 6	1; 6
3	(Malta) (Tunisia)	Elaine Genovese / Helene Pellicano; Chiraz Bechri / Mouna Bouzgarrou	6; 0	6; 1

=== Ireland vs. Morocco ===
Ireland
1
National Tennis School & Tennis Club Acvila, Chișinău, Moldova
17 June 2017
Clay

Morocco
2

			1	2	3
1	(Republic of Ireland) (Morocco)	Jane Fennelly; Abir Elfahimi	6; 3	2; 6	6; 0
2	(Republic of Ireland) (Morocco)	Jennifer Timotin; Lina Qostal	6^{5} 7^{7}	0; 6
3	(Republic of Ireland) (Morocco)	Ruth Copas / Jane Fennelly; Rita Atik / Lina Qostal	4; 6	5; 7

== 9th to 12th play-offs ==
The third placed teams of each pool were drawn in head-to-head rounds to find the equal ninth and eleventh placed teams.

=== Armenia vs. Macedonia ===
Armenia
1
National Tennis School & Tennis Club Acvila, Chișinău, Moldova
17 June 2017
Clay

North Macedonia
2

			1	2	3
1	(Armenia) (North Macedonia)	Anna Movsisyan; Viktorija Veselinova	5; 7	6; 2	6; 2
2	(Armenia) (North Macedonia)	Marina Davtyan; Nora Hristovska	2; 6	4; 6
3	(Armenia) (North Macedonia)	Marina Davtyan / Anna Movsisyan; Nora Hristovska / Viktorija Veselinova	6; 4	4; 6	4; 6

=== Kenya vs. Algeria ===
Kenya
0
National Tennis School & Tennis Club Acvila, Chișinău, Moldova
17 June 2017
Clay

Algeria
2

			1	2	3
1	(Kenya) (Algeria)	Sneha Kotecha; Lynda Benkaddour	5; 7	2; 6
2	(Kenya) (Algeria)	Shufaa Changawa Ruwa; Amira Benaissa	3; 6	2; 6
3	(Kenya) (Algeria)	Sneha Kotecha / Shufaa Changawa Ruwa; Amira Benaissa / Lynda Benkaddour				not played

== 13th to 14th play-offs ==
The fourth placed teams of each pool were drawn in head-to-head rounds to find the thirteenth and equal fourteenth placed teams.

=== Iceland vs. Mozambique ===
Iceland
3
National Tennis School & Tennis Club Acvila, Chișinău, Moldova
17 June 2017
Clay

Mozambique
0

			1	2	3
1	(Iceland) (Mozambique)	Sofia Sóley Jónasdóttir; Cláudia Sumaia	6; 1	6; 0
2	(Iceland) (Mozambique)	Anna Soffía Grönholm; Marieta de Lyubov Nhamitambo	5; 7	6; 3	6; 2
3	(Iceland) (Mozambique)	Sofia Sóley Jónasdóttir / Selma Óskarsdóttir; Ilga Adolfo João / Marieta de Lyubov Nhamitambo	7^{7} 6^{1}	1; 6	6; 3

=== Final placements ===
Placing	Teams	
Promoted/First	Greece	Moldova
Third	Finland	Cyprus
Fifth	Malta	Morocco
Seventh	Tunisia	Ireland
Ninth	Macedonia	Algeria
Eleventh	Armenia	Kenya
Thirteenth	Iceland	
Fourteenth	Cameroon	Mozambique

- Greece and Moldova were promoted to Europe/Africa Zone Group II in 2018.
