= 2017 Fed Cup Europe/Africa Zone =

Subsection of tennis competition

The Europe/Africa Zone is one of three zones of regional competition in the 2017 Fed Cup.

== Group I ==
- Venue: Tallink Tennis Centre, Tallinn, Estonia (indoor hard)
- Date: 8–11 February

The fourteen teams were divided into two pools of three teams and two pools of four teams. The four pool winners took part in promotion play-offs to determine the two nations advancing to the World Group II play-offs. The nations finishing last in their pools took part in relegation play-offs, with the two losing nations being relegated to Group II for 2018.

Seeding: The seeding was based on the Fed Cup Rankings of 14 November 2016 (shown in parentheses below).

| Pot 1 | Pot 2 | Pot 3 |
|---|---|---|
| 1. Poland (18); 2. Croatia (22); 3. Great Britain (23); 4. Serbia (24) | 5. Turkey (29); 6. Georgia (30); 7. Hungary (31); 8. Israel (33) | 9. Bulgaria (38); 10. Portugal (42); 11. Estonia (46); 12. Austria (47); 13. Latvia (49); 14. Bosnia and Herzegovina (52) |

=== Pools ===
| | Pool A | POL | AUT | GEO |
| 1 | Poland (2–0) | | 2–1 | 2–1 |
| 2 | Austria (1–1) | 1–2 | | 2–1 |
| 3 | Georgia (0–2) | 1–2 | 1–2 | |

| | Pool B | CRO | HUN | BIH |
| 1 | Croatia (2–0) | | 2–1 | 3–0 |
| 2 | Hungary (1–1) | 1–2 | | 3–0 |
| 3 | Bosnia and Herzegovina (0–2) | 0–3 | 0–3 | |

| | Pool C | GBR | LAT | TUR | POR |
| 1 | Great Britain (3–0) | | 3–0 | 3–0 | 3–0 |
| 2 | Latvia (2–1) | 0–3 | | 2–1 | 3–0 |
| 3 | Turkey (1–2) | 0–3 | 1–2 | | 2–1 |
| 4 | Portugal (0–3) | 0–3 | 0–3 | 1–2 | |

| | Pool D | SRB | EST | BUL | ISR |
| 1 | Serbia (3–0) | | 2–1 | 2–1 | 2–1 |
| 2 | Estonia (2–1) | 1–2 | | 2–1 | 2–1 |
| 3 | Bulgaria (1–2) | 1–2 | 1–2 | | 2–1 |
| 4 | Israel (0–3) | 1–2 | 1–2 | 1–2 | |

=== Play-offs ===
| Placing | A Team | Score | D Team |
|---|---|---|---|
| Promotional | Poland | 1–2 | Serbia |
| 5th–8th | Austria | 2–1 | Estonia |
| 9th | — | | Bulgaria |
| Relegation | Georgia | 2–1 | Israel |

| Placing | B Team | Score | C Team |
|---|---|---|---|
| Promotional | Croatia | 1–2 | Great Britain |
| 5th–8th | Hungary | 2–0 | Latvia |
| 9th | — | | Turkey |
| Relegation | Bosnia and Herzegovina | 1–2 | Portugal |

=== Final placements ===
| Placing | Teams | |
| Promoted/First | Serbia | Great Britain |
| Third | Poland | Croatia |
| Fifth | Austria | Hungary |
| Seventh | Estonia | Latvia |
| Ninth | Bulgaria | Turkey |
| Eleventh | Georgia | Portugal |
| Relegated/Thirteenth | Israel | Bosnia and Herzegovina |

- Serbia and Great Britain were promoted to 2017 Fed Cup World Group II Play-offs
- Israel and Bosnia and Herzegovina were relegated to Europe/Africa Zone Group II in 2018

== Group II ==
- Venue: Šiauliai Tennis School, Šiauliai, Lithuania (indoor hard)
- Date: 19–22 April

The eight teams were divided into two pools of four teams. The two nations placing first and second took part in play-offs to determine the two nations advancing to Group I. The nations finishing third and last in their pools took part in relegation play-offs, with the two losing nations being relegated to Group III for 2018.

Seeding: The seeding was based on the Fed Cup Rankings of 13 February 2017 (shown in parentheses below).

| Pot 1 | Pot 2 | Pot 3 | Pot 4 |
|---|---|---|---|
| 1. Sweden (50); 2. Denmark (52) | 3. Lithuania (57); 4. South Africa (61) | 5. Egypt (63); 6. Norway (68) | 7. Luxembourg (73); 8. Slovenia (80) |

=== Pools ===
| | Pool A | SLO | SWE | NOR | RSA |
| 1 | Slovenia (2–1) | | 3–0 | 1–2 | 3-0 |
| 2 | Sweden (2–1) | 0–3 | | 3–0 | 3–0 |
| 3 | Norway (2–1) | 2–1 | 0–3 | | 3–0 |
| 4 | South Africa (0–3) | 0–3 | 0–3 | 0–3 | |

| | Pool B | DEN | LUX | EGY | LTU |
| 1 | Denmark (3–0) | | 2–1 | 2–1 | 3–0 |
| 2 | Luxembourg (1–2) | 1–2 | | 1–2 | 3–0 |
| 3 | Egypt (1–2) | 1–2 | 2–1 | | 1–2 |
| 4 | Lithuania (1–2) | 0–3 | 0–3 | 2–1 | |

=== Play-offs ===
| Placing | A Team | Score | B Team |
|---|---|---|---|
| Promotional | Slovenia | 2–0 | Luxembourg |
| Promotional | Sweden | 2–1 | Denmark |
| Relegation | Norway | 2–0 | Lithuania |
| Relegation | South Africa | 0–2 | Egypt |

=== Final placements ===
| Placing | Teams | |
| Promoted/First | Slovenia | Sweden |
| Third | Luxembourg | Denmark |
| Fifth | Norway | Egypt |
| Relegated/Seventh | Lithuania | South Africa |

- Slovenia and Sweden were promoted to Europe/Africa Zone Group I in 2018
- Lithuania and South Africa were relegated to Europe/Africa Zone Group III in 2018

== Group III ==
- Venue: National Tennis School & Tennis Club Acvila, Chișinău, Moldova (outdoor clay)
- Date: 13–17 June

The fifteen teams were divided into one pool of three teams and three pools of four teams. The four nations placing first took part in play-offs to determine the two nations advancing to Group II.

Seeding: The seeding was based on the Fed Cup Rankings of 24 April 2017 (shown in parentheses below).

| Pot 1 | Pot 2 | Pot 3 | Pot 4 |
|---|---|---|---|
| 1. Greece (70); 2. Ireland (72); 3. Finland (73); 4. Moldova (74) | 5. Macedonia (77); 6. Cyprus (83); 7. Armenia (84); 8. Morocco (88) | 9. Tunisia (89); 10. Algeria (91); 11. Malta (93); 12. Kenya (97) | 13. Mozambique (101); 14. Iceland (102); 15. Cameroon (-) |

=== Pools ===
| | Pool A | GRE | MLT | ARM |
| 1 | Greece (2–0) | | 2–1 | 3–0 |
| 2 | Malta (1–1) | 1–2 | | 3–0 |
| 3 | Armenia (0–2) | 0–3 | 0–3 | |

| | Pool B | CYP | IRL | KEN | ISL |
| 1 | Cyprus (3–0) | | 3–0 | 3–0 | 3–0 |
| 2 | Ireland (2–1) | 0–3 | | 2–1 | 3–0 |
| 3 | Kenya (1–2) | 0–3 | 1–2 | | 2–1 |
| 4 | Iceland (0–3) | 0–3 | 0–3 | 1–2 | |

| | Pool C | FIN | TUN | MKD | CMR |
| 1 | Finland (3–0) | | 2–1 | 3–0 | 3–0 |
| 2 | Tunisia (2–1) | 1–2 | | 3–0 | 3–0 |
| 3 | Macedonia (1–2) | 0–3 | 0–3 | | 3–0 |
| 4 | Cameroon (0–3) | 0–3 | 0–3 | 0–3 | |

| | Pool D | MDA | MAR | ALG | MOZ |
| 1 | Moldova (3–0) | | 3–0 | 3–0 | 3–0 |
| 2 | Morocco (2–1) | 0–3 | | 3–0 | 3–0 |
| 3 | Algeria (1–2) | 0–3 | 0–3 | | 3–0 |
| 4 | Mozambique (0–3) | 0–3 | 0–3 | 0–3 | |

=== Play-offs ===
| Placing | A Team | Score | C Team |
|---|---|---|---|
| Promotional | Greece | 2–0 | Finland |
| 5th–8th | Malta | 2–1 | Tunisia |
| 9th–12th | Armenia | 1–2 | Macedonia |
| 13th–14th | — | | Cameroon |

| Placing | B Team | Score | D Team |
|---|---|---|---|
| Promotional | Cyprus | 0–2 | Moldova |
| 5th–8th | Ireland | 1–2 | Morocco |
| 9th–12th | Kenya | 0–2 | Algeria |
| 13th–14th | Iceland | 3–0 | Mozambique |

=== Final placements ===
| Placing | Teams | |
| Promoted/First | Greece | Moldova |
| Third | Finland | Cyprus |
| Fifth | Malta | Morocco |
| Seventh | Tunisia | Ireland |
| Ninth | Macedonia | Algeria |
| Eleventh | Armenia | Kenya |
| Thirteenth | Iceland | |
| Fourteenth | Cameroon | Mozambique |

- Greece and Moldova were promoted to Europe/Africa Zone Group II in 2018.
