= 2019 Fed Cup Europe/Africa Zone Group III – play-offs =

Subsection of tennis competition

The play-offs of the 2019 Fed Cup Europe/Africa Zone Group III were the final stages of the Group III zonal competition involving teams from Europe and Africa. Using the positions determined in their pools, the sixteen teams faced off to determine their placing in the 2019 Fed Cup Europe/Africa Zone Group III. The top two teams advanced to Fed Cup Europe/Africa Zone Group II.

Placing	Pool A (Helsinki)	Pool B (Helsinki)	Pool A (Ulcinj)	Pool B (Ulcinj)
1	Finland	Cyprus	Norway	Egypt
2	Lithuania	Kosovo	Montenegro	Ireland
3	Malta	North Macedonia	Armenia	Morocco
4	Iceland	Algeria	—N/a	Kenya
5	—N/a	Congo	—N/a	

== Promotional play-offs ==
The first placed teams of each pool were drawn in head-to-head rounds. The winners advanced to Group II in 2020.

=== Finland vs. Cyprus ===
Finland
2
Tali Tennis Center, Helsinki, Finland
20 April 2019
Hard (indoor)

Cyprus
0

			1	2	3
1	(Finland) (Cyprus)	Mia Eklund; Eleni Louka	6; 1	4; 6	6; 3
2	(Finland) (Cyprus)	Anastasia Kulikova; Raluca Șerban	6; 3	6^{4} 7^{7}	6; 3
3	(Finland) (Cyprus)	Laura Hietaranta / Emma Laine; Eleni Louka / Raluca Șerban				not played

=== Norway vs. Egypt ===
Norway
1
Ulcinj Bellevue, Ulcinj, Montenegro
20 April 2019
Clay

Egypt
2

			1	2	3
1	(Norway) (Egypt)	Malene Helgø; Mayar Sherif	1; 6	1; 6
2	(Norway) (Egypt)	Melanie Stokke; Sandra Samir	6; 1	5; 7	6; 2
3	(Norway) (Egypt)	Astrid Wanja Brune Olsen / Malene Helgø; Mayar Sherif / Rana Sherif Ahmed	5; 7	3; 6

== 3rd to 4th play-offs ==
The second placed teams of each pool were drawn in head-to-head rounds to find the equal third and fourth placed teams.

=== Lithuania vs. Kosovo ===
Lithuania
2
Tali Tennis Center, Helsinki, Finland
20 April 2019
Hard (indoor)

Kosovo
0

			1	2	3
1	(Lithuania) (Kosovo)	Iveta Daujotaitė; Donika Bashota	7^{7} 6^{4}	6; 3
2	(Lithuania) (Kosovo)	Joana Eidukonytė; Arlinda Rushiti	6; 4	6; 2
3	(Lithuania) (Kosovo)	Iveta Daujotaitė / Joana Eidukonytė; Donika Bashota / Arlinda Rushiti				not played

=== Montenegro vs. Ireland ===
Montenegro
1
Ulcinj Bellevue, Ulcinj, Montenegro
20 April 2019
Clay

Ireland
2

			1	2	3
1	(Montenegro) (Republic of Ireland)	Divna Ratković; Sinéad Lohan	1; 6	1; 6
2	(Montenegro) (Republic of Ireland)	Vladica Babić; Juliana Carton	6; 4	6; 0
3	(Montenegro) (Republic of Ireland)	Vladica Babić / Divna Ratković; Rachael Dillon / Sinéad Lohan	4; 6	6; 3	3; 6

== 5th to 6th play-offs ==
The third placed teams of each pool were drawn in head-to-head rounds to find the equal fifth and sixth placed teams.

=== Malta vs. North Macedonia ===
Malta
0
Tali Tennis Center, Helsinki, Finland
20 April 2019
Hard (indoor)

North Macedonia
2

			1	2	3
1	(Malta) (North Macedonia)	Krysta Dimech; Aleksandra Simeva	0; 6	0; 6
2	(Malta) (North Macedonia)	Maja Glumac; Ana Ristevska	1; 6	0; 6
3	(Malta) (North Macedonia)	Maria Giorgia Farrugia Sacco / Maja Glumac; Ana Ristevska / Aleksandra Simeva				not played

=== Armenia vs. Morocco ===
Armenia
0
Ulcinj Bellevue, Ulcinj, Montenegro
20 April 2019
Clay

Morocco
3

			1	2	3
1	(Armenia) (Morocco)	Irena Muradyan; Hind Semlali	4; 6	2; 6
2	(Armenia) (Morocco)	Gabriella Akopyan; Lina Qostal	5; 7	2; 6
3	(Armenia) (Morocco)	Gabriella Akopyan / Irena Muradyan; Lina Qostal / Hind Semlali	3; 6	2; 6

== 7th to 8th play-offs ==
The fourth placed teams of each pool were drawn in head-to-head rounds to find the seventh and equal eighth placed teams.

=== Iceland vs. Algeria ===
Iceland
0
Tali Tennis Center, Helsinki, Finland
20 April 2019
Hard (indoor)

Algeria
2

			1	2	3
1	(Iceland) (Algeria)	Anna Soffía Grönholm; Inès Bekrar	6^{0} 7^{7}	3; 6
2	(Iceland) (Algeria)	Iris Staub; Yassamine Boudjadi	0; 6	1; 6
3	(Iceland) (Algeria)	Ingibjörg Hjartardóttir / Selma Óskarsdóttir; Inès Bekrar / Yassamine Boudjadi				not played

== Final placements ==
Placing	Teams	
Promoted/First	Finland	Egypt
Second	Cyprus	Norway
Third	Lithuania	Ireland
Fourth	Kosovo	Montenegro
Fifth	North Macedonia	Morocco
Sixth	Malta	Armenia
Seventh	Algeria	Kenya
Eighth	Iceland	
Ninth	Congo	

- Finland and Egypt were promoted to Europe/Africa Zone Group II in 2020.
