= Lina Qostal =

Moroccan tennis player

Lina Qostal لينة قصطال
- Country (sports): Morocco
- Born: 11 March 1997 (age 29) Rabat, Morocco
- Plays: Right (two-handed backhand)
- Prize money: $12,172

Singles
- Career record: 32–35
- Career titles: 0
- Highest ranking: No. 1,165 (19 May 2014)

Doubles
- Career record: 16–27
- Career titles: 1 ITF
- Highest ranking: No. 792 (10 November 2014)
- Last updated on: 2 July 2026.

Lina Qostal (Arabic: لينة قصطال; born 11 March 1997) is a Moroccan tennis player.

Qostal has won one doubles title on the ITF Women's Circuit in her career. On 10 November 2014, she reached her best doubles ranking of world No. 792.

Qostal made her WTA Tour debut at the 2013 Grand Prix SAR La Princesse Lalla Meryem, having been awarded a wildcard into both the singles and doubles draws. In singles, she was drawn against Karin Knapp and was beaten by the Italian in their first-round encounter. She partnered with Alizé Lim in the doubles event but fared no better there, ultimately losing to Sandra Klemenschits and Andreja Klepač in the first round.

Qostal was born in Rabat. In 2018 she graduated from the University of Pennsylvania, where she was enrolled in the College of Arts and Sciences, and was a member of the women's varsity tennis team. Qostal previously studied at Lycée Descartes in the capital city of Morocco, Rabat.

Playing for Morocco Fed Cup team, Qostal has a win–loss record of 10–3 in Fed Cup competition.

== ITF Circuit finals ==
=== Doubles (1–0) ===
| Legend $10,000 tournaments | Finals by surface Clay (1–0) |

| Result | Date | Tournament | Surface | Partner | Opponents | Score |
|---|---|---|---|---|---|---|
| Win | Nov 2013 | Oujda, Morocco | Clay | (Madagascar) Zarah Razafimahatratra | (Australia) Alexandra Nancarrow (Spain) Olga Parres Azcoitia | 6–3, 7–5 |

== Fed Cup participation ==
=== Singles (5–0) ===
| Edition | Stage | Date | Location | Against | Surface | Opponent | W/L | Score |
|---|---|---|---|---|---|---|---|---|
| 2013 Fed Cup; Europe/Africa Zone Group III | P/O | 11 May 2013 | Chișinău, Moldova | Madagascar | Clay | (Madagascar) Hariniony Andriamananarivo | W | 6–2, 6–2 |
| 2017 Fed Cup; Europe/Africa Zone Group III | R/R | 13 June 2017 | Chișinău, Moldova | Mozambique | Clay | (Mozambique) Marieta de Lyubov Nhamitambo | W | 6–0, 6–1 |
| 2017 Fed Cup; Europe/Africa Zone Group III | P/O | 17 June 2017 | Chișinău, Moldova | (Republic of Ireland) Ireland | Clay | (Republic of Ireland) Jennifer Timotin | W | 7–6^{(7–5)}, 6–0 |
| 2019 Fed Cup; Europe/Africa Zone Group III | R/R | 18 April 2019 | Ulcinj, Montenegro | (Republic of Ireland) Ireland | Clay | (Republic of Ireland) Jane Fennelly | W | 6–2, 2–6, 7–6^{(7–1)} |
| 2019 Fed Cup; Europe/Africa Zone Group III | P/O | 20 April 2019 | Ulcinj, Montenegro | Armenia | Clay | (Armenia) Gabriella Akopyan | W | 7–5, 6–2 |

=== Doubles (5–3) ===
| Edition | Stage | Date | Location | Against | Surface | Partner | Opponents | W/L | Score |
|---|---|---|---|---|---|---|---|---|---|
| 2013 Fed Cup; Europe/Africa Zone Group III | R/R | 10 May 2013 | Chișinău, Moldova | Denmark | Clay | (Morocco) Nadia Lalami | (Denmark) Martine Ditlev (Denmark) Malou Ejdesgaard | L | 2–6, 3–6 |
| 2013 Fed Cup; Europe/Africa Zone Group III | P/O | 11 May 2013 | Chișinău, Moldova | Madagascar | Clay | (Morocco) Nadia Lalami | (Madagascar) Hariniony Andriamananarivo (Madagascar) Zarah Razafimahatratra | A * | 5–7, 2–2 |
| 2017 Fed Cup; Europe/Africa Zone Group III | R/R | 14 June 2017 | Chișinău, Moldova | Algeria | Clay | (Morocco) Abir El Fahimi | (Algeria) Amira Benaïssa (Algeria) Lynda Benkaddour | W | 6–2, 6–3 |
| 2017 Fed Cup; Europe/Africa Zone Group III | R/R | 15 June 2017 | Chișinău, Moldova | Moldova | Clay | (Morocco) Rita Atik | (Moldova) Gabriela Porubin (Moldova) Vitalia Stamat | L | 2–6, 6–4, 3–6 |
| 2017 Fed Cup; Europe/Africa Zone Group III | P/O | 17 June 2017 | Chișinău, Moldova | (Republic of Ireland) Ireland | Clay | (Morocco) Rita Atik | (Republic of Ireland) Ruth Copas (Republic of Ireland) Jane Fennelly | W | 6–4, 7–5 |
| 2019 Fed Cup; Europe/Africa Zone Group III | R/R | 18 April 2019 | Ulcinj, Montenegro | (Republic of Ireland) Ireland | Clay | (Morocco) Rita Atik | (Republic of Ireland) Rachael Dillon (Republic of Ireland) Sinéad Lohan | L | 5–7, 4–6 |
| 2019 Fed Cup; Europe/Africa Zone Group III | R/R | 19 April 2019 | Ulcinj, Montenegro | Egypt | Clay | (Morocco) Hind Semlali | (Egypt) Ola Abou Zekry (Egypt) Rana Sherif Ahmed | W | 6–3, 3–6, 1–1 ret. |
| 2019 Fed Cup; Europe/Africa Zone Group III | P/O | 20 April 2019 | Ulcinj, Montenegro | Armenia | Clay | (Morocco) Hind Semlali | (Armenia) Gabriella Akopyan (Armenia) Irena Muradyan | W | 6–3, 6–2 |

- abandoned doesn't count in her overall record.
