= Moldova Billie Jean King Cup team =

National tennis team

Moldova
- Captain: Daniela Ciobanu
- ITF ranking: 79 (13 April 2026)
- Colors: Blue & Black
- First year: 1998
- Years played: 23
- Ties played (W–L): 97 (47–50)
- Best finish: Europe/Africa Zone Group II
- Most total wins: Arina Gamretkaia (22–8)
- Most singles wins: Daniela Ciobanu (14–10)
- Most doubles wins: Arina Gamretkaia (11–4)
- Most ties played: Daniela Ciobanu (29)
- Most years played: Daniela Ciobanu (10)

The Moldova Billie Jean King Cup team represents Moldova in the Billie Jean King Cup tennis competition and is governed by the Moldovan Tennis Federation.

== History ==
Moldova made their Fed Cup debut in 1998. Their best result was second place in their Group II pool in 1999 and 2000. Prior to 1992, Moldovan players represented the Soviet Union.

== Current team ==
- Abigail Rencheli
- Arina Gamretkaia
- Lia Belibova
- Daniela Ciobanu

== Results ==
=== 1990s ===
| Year | Competition | Date | Location | Opponent | Score | Result |
|---|---|---|---|---|---|---|
Fed Cup
| 1998 | Europe/Africa Zone Group II, Round robin | 5 May | Manavgat (TUR) | Georgia | 0–3 | Loss |
| 1998 | Europe/Africa Zone Group II, Round robin | 6 May | Manavgat (TUR) | Iceland | 3–0 | Win |
| 1998 | Europe/Africa Zone Group II, Round robin | 7 May | Manavgat (TUR) | Ireland | 1–2 | Loss |
| 1998 | Europe/Africa Zone Group II, Round robin | 8 May | Manavgat (TUR) | Estonia | 1–2 | Loss |
| 1998 | Europe/Africa Zone Group II, Round robin | 9 May | Manavgat (TUR) | Bosnia and Herzegovina | 2–1 | Win |
| 1999 | Europe/Africa Zone Group II, Round robin | 26 April | La Manga (ESP) | Israel | 0–3 | Loss |
| 1999 | Europe/Africa Zone Group II, Round robin | 27 April | La Manga (ESP) | Tunisia | 2–1 | Win |
| 1999 | Europe/Africa Zone Group II, Round robin | 29 April | La Manga (ESP) | Iceland | 3–0 | Win |
| 1999 | Europe/Africa Zone Group II, Round robin | 30 April | La Manga (ESP) | Armenia | 3–0 | Win |

=== 2000s ===
| Year | Competition | Date | Location | Opponent | Score | Result |
|---|---|---|---|---|---|---|
| 2000 | Europe/Africa Zone Group II, Round robin | 28 March | Estoril (POR) | Estonia | 1–2 | Loss |
| 2000 | Europe/Africa Zone Group II, Round robin | 29 March | Estoril (POR) | Algeria | 3–0 | Win |
| 2000 | Europe/Africa Zone Group II, Round robin | 30 March | Estoril (POR) | Portugal | 2–1 | Win |
| 2000 | Europe/Africa Zone Group II, Round robin | 31 March | Estoril (POR) | Lesotho | 3–0 | Win |
| 2000 | Europe/Africa Zone Group II, Round robin | 1 April | Estoril (POR) | Madagascar | 1–0 | Win |
| 2001 | Europe/Africa Zone Group II, Round robin | 15 May | Belek (TUR) | Turkey | 0–3 | Loss |
| 2001 | Europe/Africa Zone Group II, Round robin | 16 May | Belek (TUR) | Botswana | 2–1 | Win |
| 2001 | Europe/Africa Zone Group II, Round robin | 17 May | Belek (TUR) | Tunisia | 3–0 | Win |
| 2001 | Europe/Africa Zone Group II, Round robin | 18 May | Belek (TUR) | Lithuania | 0–3 | Loss |
| 2005 | Europe/Africa Zone Group III, Round robin | 27 April | Manavgat (TUR) | Kenya | 3–0 | Win |
| 2005 | Europe/Africa Zone Group III, Round robin | 28 April | Manavgat (TUR) | Portugal | 1–2 | Loss |
| 2005 | Europe/Africa Zone Group III, 5th to 8th play-off | 30 April | Manavgat (TUR) | Namibia | 1–2 | Loss |
| 2006 | Europe/Africa Zone Group III, Round robin | 26 April | Manavgat (TUR) | Norway | 0–2 | Loss |
| 2006 | Europe/Africa Zone Group III, Round robin | 26 April | Manavgat (TUR) | Turkey | 0–2 | Loss |
| 2006 | Europe/Africa Zone Group III, Round robin | 27 April | Manavgat (TUR) | Iceland | 2–0 | Win |
| 2006 | Europe/Africa Zone Group III, Round robin | 28 April | Manavgat (TUR) | Tunisia | 1–2 | Loss |
| 2007 | Europe/Africa Zone Group III, Round robin | 24 April | Vacoas-Phoenix (MRI) | Montenegro | 0–3 | Loss |
| 2007 | Europe/Africa Zone Group III, Round robin | 25 April | Vacoas-Phoenix (MRI) | Ireland | 0–3 | Loss |
| 2007 | Europe/Africa Zone Group III, Round robin | 26 April | Vacoas-Phoenix (MRI) | Malta | 0–3 | Loss |
| 2007 | Europe/Africa Zone Group III, Round robin | 27 April | Vacoas-Phoenix (MRI) | Latvia | 0–2 | Loss |
| 2008 | Europe/Africa Zone Group III, Round robin | 22 April | Yerevan (ARM) | Montenegro | 1–2 | Loss |
| 2008 | Europe/Africa Zone Group III, Round robin | 23 April | Yerevan (ARM) | Egypt | 1–2 | Loss |
| 2008 | Europe/Africa Zone Group III, Round robin | 24 April | Yerevan (ARM) | Morocco | 0–3 | Loss |
| 2008 | Europe/Africa Zone Group III, Round robin | 25 April | Yerevan (ARM) | Finland | 1–2 | Loss |
| 2008 | Europe/Africa Zone Group III, Round robin | 26 April | Yerevan (ARM) | Armenia | 0–3 | Loss |
| 2009 | Europe/Africa Zone Group III, Round robin | 21 April | Marsa (MLT) | Armenia | 0–3 | Loss |
| 2009 | Europe/Africa Zone Group III, Round robin | 22 April | Marsa (MLT) | Egypt | 1–2 | Loss |
| 2009 | Europe/Africa Zone Group III, Round robin | 23 April | Marsa (MLT) | Iceland | 3–0 | Win |
| 2009 | Europe/Africa Zone Group III, Round robin | 24 April | Marsa (MLT) | Norway | 0–3 | Loss |
| 2009 | Europe/Africa Zone Group III, Round robin | 25 April | Marsa (MLT) | Liechtenstein | 0–3 | Loss |

=== 2010s ===
| Year | Competition | Date | Location | Opponent | Score | Result |
|---|---|---|---|---|---|---|
| 2010 | Europe/Africa Zone Group III, Round robin | 22 April | Cairo (EGY) | Turkey | 0–3 | Loss |
| 2010 | Europe/Africa Zone Group III, Round robin | 23 April | Cairo (EGY) | Egypt | 0–3 | Loss |
| 2010 | Europe/Africa Zone Group III, 5th to 6th play-off | 24 April | Cairo (EGY) | Ireland | 1–2 | Loss |
| 2011 | Europe/Africa Zone Group III, Round robin | 2 May | Cairo (EGY) | Ireland | 0–3 | Loss |
| 2011 | Europe/Africa Zone Group III, Round robin | 3 May | Cairo (EGY) | Tunisia | 0–3 | Loss |
| 2011 | Europe/Africa Zone Group III, Round robin | 4 May | Cairo (EGY) | Norway | 0–3 | Loss |
| 2011 | Europe/Africa Zone Group III, Round robin | 5 May | Cairo (EGY) | Egypt | 1–2 | Loss |
| 2012 | Europe/Africa Zone Group III, Round robin | 16 April | Cairo (EGY) | Tunisia | 0–3 | Loss |
| 2012 | Europe/Africa Zone Group III, Round robin | 17 April | Cairo (EGY) | Lithuania | 0–3 | Loss |
| 2012 | Europe/Africa Zone Group III, Round robin | 18 April | Cairo (EGY) | Cyprus | 2–1 | Win |
| 2012 | Europe/Africa Zone Group III, Round robin | 19 April | Cairo (EGY) | Namibia | 2–1 | Win |
| 2012 | Europe/Africa Zone Group III, Round robin | 20 April | Cairo (EGY) | Egypt | 0–3 | Loss |
| 2012 | Europe/Africa Zone Group III, 5th to 8th play-off | 21 April | Cairo (EGY) | Malta | 2–1 | Win |
| 2013 | Europe/Africa Zone Group III, Round robin | 8 May | Chișinău (MDA) | Kenya | 3–0 | Win |
| 2013 | Europe/Africa Zone Group III, Round robin | 10 May | Chișinău (MDA) | Ireland | 2–1 | Win |
| 2013 | Europe/Africa Zone Group III, 1st to 4th play-off | 11 May | Chișinău (MDA) | Egypt | 0–2 | Loss |
| 2014 | Europe/Africa Zone Group III, Round robin | 6 February | Tallinn (EST) | Cyprus | 3–0 | Win |
| 2014 | Europe/Africa Zone Group III, Round robin | 7 February | Tallinn (EST) | Greece | 1–2 | Loss |
| 2014 | Europe/Africa Zone Group III, 5th to 8th play-off | 8 February | Tallinn (EST) | Malta | 3–0 | Win |
| 2015 | Europe/Africa Zone Group III, Round robin | 14 April | Ulcinj (MNE) | Mozambique | 3–0 | Win |
| 2015 | Europe/Africa Zone Group III, Round robin | 15 April | Ulcinj (MNE) | Macedonia | 2–1 | Win |
| 2015 | Europe/Africa Zone Group III, Round robin | 16 April | Ulcinj (MNE) | Namibia | 2–1 | Win |
| 2015 | Europe/Africa Zone Group III, 1st to 4th play-off | 18 April | Ulcinj (MNE) | Lithuania | 1–2 | Loss |
| 2016 | Europe/Africa Zone Group III, Round robin | 11 April | Ulcinj (MNE) | Madagascar | 1–2 | Loss |
| 2016 | Europe/Africa Zone Group III, Round robin | 12 April | Ulcinj (MNE) | Algeria | 3–0 | Win |
| 2016 | Europe/Africa Zone Group III, Round robin | 14 April | Ulcinj (MNE) | Cyprus | 2–1 | Win |
| 2016 | Europe/Africa Zone Group III, 1st to 4th play-off | 16 April | Ulcinj (MNE) | Luxembourg | 0–2 | Loss |
| 2017 | Europe/Africa Zone Group III, Round robin | 14 June | Chișinău (MDA) | Mozambique | 3–0 | Win |
| 2017 | Europe/Africa Zone Group III, Round robin | 15 June | Chișinău (MDA) | Algeria | 3–0 | Win |
| 2017 | Europe/Africa Zone Group III, Round robin | 16 June | Chișinău (MDA) | Morocco | 3–0 | Win |
| 2017 | Europe/Africa Zone Group III, 1st to 4th play-off | 17 June | Chișinău (MDA) | Cyprus | 2–0 | Win |

=== 2020s ===
| Year | Competition | Date | Location | Opponent | Score | Result |
|---|---|---|---|---|---|---|
Billie Jean King Cup
| 2020–21 | Europe/Africa Zone Group II, Round robin | 4 February | Helsinki (FIN) | Tunisia | 0–3 | Loss |
| 2020–21 | Europe/Africa Zone Group II, Round robin | 5 February | Helsinki (FIN) | Georgia | 0–3 | Loss |
| 2020–21 | Europe/Africa Zone Group II, Round robin | 6 February | Helsinki (FIN) | Israel | 0–3 | Loss |
| 2020–21 | Europe/Africa Zone Group II, 5th to 8th play-off | 7 February | Helsinki (FIN) | Egypt | 0–2 | Loss |
| 2022 | Europe/Africa Zone Group III, Round robin | 7 June | Ulcinj (MNE) | Armenia | 2–1 | Win |
| 2022 | Europe/Africa Zone Group III, Round robin | 8 June | Ulcinj (MNE) | Morocco | 0–3 | Loss |
| 2022 | Europe/Africa Zone Group III, Round robin | 10 June | Ulcinj (MNE) | Mauritius | 2–0 | Win |
| 2022 | Europe/Africa Zone Group III, 4th to 6th play-off | 10–11 June | Ulcinj (MNE) | Cyprus | 2–1 | Win |
| 2022 | Europe/Africa Zone Group III, 4th to 6th play-off | 11 June | Ulcinj (MNE) | Montenegro | 2–1 | Win |
| 2023 | Europe Zone Group III, Round robin | 19 June | Skopje (MKD) | Iceland | 3–0 | Win |
| 2023 | Europe Zone Group III, Round robin | 20 June | Skopje (MKD) | Finland | 0–3 | Loss |
| 2023 | Europe Zone Group III, Round robin | 21 June | Skopje (MKD) | Albania | 3–0 | Win |
| 2023 | Europe Zone Group III, Round robin | 22 June | Skopje (MKD) | Azerbaijan | 3–0 | Win |
| 2023 | Europe Zone Group III, Round robin | 23 June | Skopje (MKD) | North Macedonia | 0–3 | Loss |
| 2023 | Europe Zone Group III, 5th to 6th play-off | 24 June | Skopje (MKD) | Luxembourg | 1–2 | Loss |
| 2024 | Europe Zone Group III, Round robin | 18 June | Chișinău (MDA) | Iceland | 3–0 | Win |
| 2024 | Europe Zone Group III, Round robin | 19 June | Chișinău (MDA) | Finland | 1–2 | Loss |
| 2024 | Europe Zone Group III, 4th to 6th play-off | 20 June | Chișinău (MDA) | Luxembourg | 3–0 | Win |
| 2024 | Europe Zone Group III, 4th to 6th play-off | 22 June | Chișinău (MDA) | Armenia | 2–0 | Win |
| 2025 | Europe Zone Group III, Round robin | 16 June | Chișinău (MDA) | Albania | 3–0 | Win |
| 2025 | Europe Zone Group III, Round robin | 17 June | Chișinău (MDA) | Azerbaijan | 3–0 | Win |
| 2025 | Europe Zone Group III, Round robin | 18 June | Chișinău (MDA) | Ireland | 2–1 | Win |
| 2025 | Europe Zone Group III, 1st to 3rd play-off | 20 June | Chișinău (MDA) | Armenia | 2–0 | Win |
| 2025 | Europe Zone Group III, 1st to 3rd play-off | 21 June | Chișinău (MDA) | Finland | 0–2 | Loss |
| 2026 | Europe Zone Group III, Round robin | 17 June | San Marino (SMR) | Iceland | 3–0 | Win |
| 2026 | Europe Zone Group III, Round robin | 19 June | San Marino (SMR) | Kosovo | 3–0 | Win |
| 2026 | Europe Zone Group III, 1st to 4th play-off | 20 June | San Marino (SMR) | Malta | 2–0 | Win |
| 2027 | Europe/Africa Zone Group II, Round robin | April | | | | |
| 2027 | Europe/Africa Zone Group II, Round robin | April | | | | |
| 2027 | Europe/Africa Zone Group II, Round robin | April | | | | |
| 2027 | Europe/Africa Zone Group II, Round robin | April | | | | |

== Head-to-head record ==
As of 20 June 2026, following the tie against Malta.

Africa

- Egypt 0–7
- Tunisia 2–4
- Algeria 3–0
- Namibia 2–1
- Morocco 1–2
- Kenya 2–0
- Mozambique 2–0
- Madagascar 1–1
- Lesotho 1–0
- Botswana 1–0
- Mauritius 1–0

Europe

- Iceland 7–0
- Armenia 4–2
- Ireland 2–4
- Cyprus 5–0
- Malta 3–1
- Finland 0–4
- Montenegro 1–2
- Luxembourg 1–2
- Turkey 0–3
- Norway 0–3
- Lithuania 0–3

- Albania 2–0
- Azerbaijan 2–0
- Portugal 1–1
- North Macedonia 1–1
- Estonia 0–2
- Georgia 0–2
- Israel 0–2
- Bosnia and Herzegovina 1–0
- Kosovo 1–0
- Latvia 0–1
- Liechtenstein 0–1

- Greece 0–1

== See also ==
- Billie Jean King Cup
- Moldova Davis Cup team
