= 2019 Fed Cup Europe/Africa Zone Group III – Pool B (Ulcinj) =

Subsection of tennis competition

Pool B (Ulcinj) of the 2019 Fed Cup Europe/Africa Group III was one of four pools in the Europe/Africa Group III of the 2019 Fed Cup. Four teams competed in a round robin competition, with the top team and bottom teams proceeding to their respective section of the play-offs: the top team played for advancement to Group II.

== Standings ==
		EGY	IRL	MAR	KEN	RR; W–L	Set; W–L	Game; W–L	Standings
4	Egypt		2–1	2–1	3–0	3–0	16–4 (80%)	103–53 (66%)	1
10	Ireland	1–2		2–1	3–0	2–1	13–7 (65%)	101–66 (60%)	2
6	Morocco	1–2	1–2		3–0	1–2	8–12 (40%)	85–79 (52%)	3
14	Kenya	0–3	0–3	0–3		0–3	0–18 (0%)	18–109 (14%)	4

Standings are determined by: 1. number of wins; 2. if two teams have the same number of wins, head-to-head record; 3. if three teams have the same number of wins, (a) number of matches won in the group, then (b) percentage of sets won in the group, then (c) percentage of games won in the group, then (d) Fed Cup rankings.

== Round robin ==
=== Egypt vs. Ireland ===
Egypt
2
Ulcinj Bellevue, Ulcinj, Montenegro
17 April 2019
Clay

Ireland
1

			1	2	3
1	(Egypt) (Republic of Ireland)	Lamis Alhussein Abdel Aziz; Sinéad Lohan	6; 4	2; 6	1; 6
2	(Egypt) (Republic of Ireland)	Sandra Samir; Juliana Carton	6; 4	6; 3
3	(Egypt) (Republic of Ireland)	Mayar Sherif / Rana Sherif Ahmed; Rachael Dillon / Sinéad Lohan	6; 0	6; 3

=== Morocco vs. Kenya ===
Morocco
3
Ulcinj Bellevue, Ulcinj, Montenegro
17 April 2019
Clay

Kenya
0

			1	2	3
1	(Morocco) (Kenya)	Hind Semlali; Alicia Owegi	6; 1	7; 5
2	(Morocco) (Kenya)	Rita Atik; Judith Muraa	6; 0	6; 0
3	(Morocco) (Kenya)	Rita Atik / Hind Semlali; Roselida Asumwa / Faith Nyabera Omurunga	6; 0	6; 0

=== Egypt vs. Kenya ===
Egypt
3
Ulcinj Bellevue, Ulcinj, Montenegro
18 April 2019
Clay

Kenya
0

			1	2	3
1	(Egypt) (Kenya)	Mayar Sherif; Alicia Owegi	6; 0	6; 1
2	(Egypt) (Kenya)	Lamis Alhussein Abdel Aziz; Faith Nyabera Omurunga	6; 0	6; 2
3	(Egypt) (Kenya)	Ola Abou Zekry / Rana Sherif Ahmed; Roselida Asumwa / Judith Muraa	6; 2	6; 1

=== Morocco vs. Ireland ===
Morocco
1
Ulcinj Bellevue, Ulcinj, Montenegro
18 April 2019
Clay

Ireland
2

			1	2	3
1	(Morocco) (Republic of Ireland)	Lina Qostal; Jane Fennelly	6; 2	2; 6	7^{7} 6^{1}
2	(Morocco) (Republic of Ireland)	Rita Atik; Sinéad Lohan	3; 6	0; 6
3	(Morocco) (Republic of Ireland)	Rita Atik / Lina Qostal; Rachael Dillon / Sinéad Lohan	5; 7	4; 6

=== Egypt vs. Morocco ===
Egypt
2
Ulcinj Bellevue, Ulcinj, Montenegro
19 April 2019
Clay

Morocco
1

			1	2	3
1	(Egypt) (Morocco)	Mayar Sherif; Hind Semlali	6; 0	6; 1
2	(Egypt) (Morocco)	Lamis Alhussein Abdel Aziz; Rita Atik	6; 3	6; 2
3	(Egypt) (Morocco)	Ola Abou Zekry / Rana Sherif Ahmed; Lina Qostal / Hind Semlali	3; 6	6; 3	1; 0	retired

=== Kenya vs. Ireland ===
Kenya
0
Ulcinj Bellevue, Ulcinj, Montenegro
19 April 2019
Clay

Ireland
3

			1	2	3
1	(Kenya) (Republic of Ireland)	Roselida Asumwa; Juliana Carton	0; 6	2; 6
2	(Kenya) (Republic of Ireland)	Alicia Owegi; Aisling O'Connor	2; 6	1; 6
3	(Kenya) (Republic of Ireland)	Roselida Asumwa / Faith Nyabera Omurunga; Rachael Dillon / Jane Fennelly	1; 6	0; 6

== See also ==
- Fed Cup structure
