= 2017 Fed Cup Europe/Africa Zone Group III – Pool D =

Subsection of tennis competition

Pool D of the 2017 Fed Cup Europe/Africa Group III was one of four pools in the Europe/Africa Group III of the 2017 Fed Cup. Four teams competed in a round robin competition, with the top team and bottom teams proceeding to their respective section of the play-offs: the top team played for advancement to Group II.

== Standings ==
		MDA	MAR	ALG	MOZ	RR; W–L	Set; W–L	Game; W–L	Standings
74	Moldova		3–0	3–0	3–0	3–0	18–3 (86%)	123–54 (69%)	1
88	Morocco	0–3		3–0	3–0	2–1	14–6 (70%)	94–60 (61%)	2
91	Algeria	0–3	0–3		3–0	1–2	7–12 (37%)	71–84 (46%)	3
101	Mozambique	0–3	0–3	0–3		0–3	0–18 (0%)	18–108 (14%)	4

Standings are determined by: 1. number of wins; 2. if two teams have the same number of wins, head-to-head record; 3. if three teams have the same number of wins, (a) number of matches won in the group, then (b) percentage of sets won in the group, then (c) percentage of games won in the group, then (d) Fed Cup rankings.

== Round-robin ==
=== Moldova vs. Mozambique ===
Moldova
3
National Tennis School & Tennis Club Acvila, Chișinău, Moldova
13 June 2017
Clay

Mozambique
0

			1	2	3
1	(Moldova) (Mozambique)	Vitalia Stamat; Cláudia Sumaia	6; 0	6; 2
2	(Moldova) (Mozambique)	Daniela Ciobanu; Marieta de Lyubov Nhamitambo	6; 2	6; 1
3	(Moldova) (Mozambique)	Alexandra Perper / Gabriela Porubin; Marieta de Lyubov Nhamitambo / Cláudia Sumaia	6; 1	6; 0

=== Morocco vs. Algeria ===
Morocco
3
National Tennis School & Tennis Club Acvila, Chișinău, Moldova
13 June 2017
Clay

Algeria
0

			1	2	3
1	(Morocco) (Algeria)	Ghita Benhadi; Fatima Zohra Boukezzi	6; 2	6; 0
2	(Morocco) (Algeria)	Rita Atik; Amira Benaissa	6; 1	6; 1
3	(Morocco) (Algeria)	Abir Elfahimi / Lina Qostal; Amira Benaissa / Lynda Benkaddour	6; 2	6; 3

=== Moldova vs. Algeria ===
Moldova
3
National Tennis School & Tennis Club Acvila, Chișinău, Moldova
15 June 2017
Clay

Algeria
0

			1	2	3
1	(Moldova) (Algeria)	Gabriela Porubin; Lynda Benkaddour	7^{7} 6^{1}	6^{6} 7^{8}	6; 3
2	(Moldova) (Algeria)	Alexandra Perper; Amira Benaissa	6; 3	6; 4
3	(Moldova) (Algeria)	Alexandra Perper / Vitalia Stamat; Amira Benaissa / Fatima Zohra Boukezzi	6; 0	6; 3

=== Morocco vs. Mozambique ===
Morocco
3
National Tennis School & Tennis Club Acvila, Chișinău, Moldova
15 June 2017
Clay

Mozambique
0

			1	2	3
1	(Morocco) (Mozambique)	Rita Atik; Cláudia Sumaia	6; 1	6; 2
2	(Morocco) (Mozambique)	Lina Qostal; Marieta de Lyubov Nhamitambo	6; 0	6; 1
3	(Morocco) (Mozambique)	Ghita Benhadi / Abir Elfahimi; Ilga Adolfo João / Cláudia Sumaia	6; 0	6; 3

=== Moldova vs. Morocco ===
Moldova
3
National Tennis School & Tennis Club Acvila, Chișinău, Moldova
16 June 2017
Clay

Morocco
0

			1	2	3
1	(Moldova) (Morocco)	Daniela Ciobanu; Ghita Benhadi	6; 2	4; 6	6; 0
2	(Moldova) (Morocco)	Alexandra Perper; Rita Atik	6; 2	6; 1
3	(Moldova) (Morocco)	Gabriela Porubin / Vitalia Stamat; Rita Atik / Lina Qostal	6; 2	4; 6	6; 3

=== Algeria vs. Mozambique ===
Algeria
3
National Tennis School & Tennis Club Acvila, Chișinău, Moldova
16 June 2017
Clay

Mozambique
0

			1	2	3
1	(Algeria) (Mozambique)	Lynda Benkaddour; Cláudia Sumaia	6; 0	6; 0
2	(Algeria) (Mozambique)	Amira Benaissa; Marieta de Lyubov Nhamitambo	6; 2	6; 1
3	(Algeria) (Mozambique)	Fatima Zohra Boukezzi / Houria Boukholda; Ilga Adolfo João / Cláudia Sumaia	6; 0	6; 2

== See also ==
- Fed Cup structure
