= Lithuania Billie Jean King Cup team =

Lithuanian women's tennis team

Lithuania
- Captain: Edita Liachovičiūtė
- Coach: Laurynas Grigelis
- Nations Ranking: 65 ▲2 (11 February 2019)
- Colors: white
- First year: 1992
- Years played: 26
- Ties played (W–L): 98 (43–50)
- Best finish: Zonal Group I RR (1992, 1993, 1994, 2004, 2007)
- Most total wins: Lina Stančiūtė (37–31)
- Most singles wins: Lina Stančiūtė (26–18)
- Most doubles wins: Lina Stančiūtė (11–13)
- Best doubles team: Justina Mikulskytė / Akvilė Paražinskaitė (4–1)
- Most ties played: Lina Stančiūtė (46)
- Most years played: Lina Stančiūtė (13)

The Lithuania Billie Jean King Cup team represents Lithuania in the Billie Jean King Cup tennis competition and are governed by the Lithuanian Tennis Association.

In 2016-2017, Lithuania played in Group II of Europe/Africa zone, but dropped to Group III in 2018.

In 2025, Laurynas Grigelis made his debut as the head coach of Lithuania's Billie Jean King Cup team.

== Team ==
Current team (2019)

- Joana Eidukonytė
- Iveta Daujotaitė
- Klaudija Bubelytė

Team (2018)

- Joana Eidukonytė
- Iveta Daujotaitė
- Paulina Bakaitė
- Gerda Zykutė

Team (2017)

- Joana Eidukonytė
- Paulina Bakaitė
- Gerda Zykutė
- Gabija Druteikaitė

Team (2016)

- Iveta Daujotaitė
- Paulina Bakaitė
- Gerda Zykutė

== Results ==
=== 2016–2018 ===
Year	Competition	Date	Location	Opponent	Score	Result
2018	Europe/Africa Zone Group III	17 April	Tunis (TUN)	Iceland	3–0	Won
2018	Europe/Africa Zone Group III	18 April	Tunis (TUN)	(North Macedonia) Macedonia	3–0	Won
2018	Europe/Africa Zone Group III	19 April	Tunis (TUN)	Armenia	3–0	Won
2018	Europe/Africa, Promotional Play-Off	21 April	Tunis (TUN)	Tunisia	2–1	Lost

Year	Competition	Date	Location	Opponent	Score	Result
2017	Europe/Africa Zone Group II	8 February	Šiauliai (LTU)	Luxembourg	3–0	Lost
2017	Europe/Africa Zone Group II	9 February	Šiauliai (LTU)	Egypt	2–1	Won
2017	Europe/Africa Zone Group II	10 February	Šiauliai (LTU)	Denmark	3–0	Lost
2017	Europe/Africa, Play-Off	11 February	Šiauliai (LTU)	Norway	2–0	Lost

Year	Competition	Date	Location	Opponent	Score	Result
2016	Europe/Africa Zone Group II	14 April	Cairo (EGY)	Denmark	3–0	Lost
2016	Europe/Africa Zone Group II	15 April	Cairo (EGY)	Finland	2–1	Won
2016	Europe/Africa, Promotional Play-Off	16 April	Cairo (EGY)	Austria	2–0	Lost

== History ==
Lithuania competed in its first Fed Cup in 1992. Their best result was appearing in Group I on five occasions.

In 2009–2010 Lithuania did not participate in Fed Cup tennis competition. They came back to the third group of Fed Cup in 2011 and stayed in the same group for 2012. In 2012 Lithuania won the play-off tie against Morocco and got promoted to the second group for the following year.

Lithuanian players represented the Soviet Union prior to 1992.

== See also ==
- Billie Jean King Cup
- Lithuania Davis Cup team
