= Rita Atik =

Moroccan tennis player

- Country (sports): Morocco
- Born: 21 October 1997 (age 28) Casablanca, Morocco
- Plays: Right-handed (two-handed backhand)
- Prize money: $14,335

Singles
- Career record: 44–51
- Highest ranking: No. 759 (7 April 2014)

Doubles
- Career record: 9–22

Team competitions
- Fed Cup: 9–12

Rita Atik (born 22 October 1997 in Casablanca) is a Moroccan former tennis player.

In 2013, she was the top Moroccan finisher (round of 16) for the girls at the Mediterranée Avenir.

She has competed multiple times in the main draw of the Grand Prix SAR La Princesse Lalla Meryem.

== ITF Junior finals ==
Category G1
Category G2
Category G3
Category G4
Category G5

=== Singles (5–1) ===
Outcome	No.	Date	Tournament	Surface	Opponent	Score
Runner-up	1.	25 February 2012	Tlemcen, Algeria	Clay	(Poland) Katarzyna Pyka	1–6, 3–6
Winner	2.	6 July 2012	Cairo, Egypt	Clay	(Namibia) Lesedi Sheya Jacobs	6–3, 3–6, 6–4
Winner	3.	23 June 2013	Carthage, Tunisia	Clay	(Egypt) Dina Hegab	6–0, 2–6, 6–3
Winner	4.	5 October 2013	Rabat, Morocco	Clay	(Egypt) Anna Ureke	2–6, 6–2, 6–1
Winner	5.	25 October 2014	Rabat, Morocco	Clay	(Romania) Selma Ștefania Cadar	6–1, 7–5
Winner	6.	1 November 2014	Mohammedia, Morocco	Clay	(Namibia) Lesedi Sheya Jacobs	6–2, 6–1

=== Doubles (3–4) ===
Outcome	No.	Date	Tournament	Surface	Partner	Opponents	Score
Winner	1.	3 March 2012	Casablanca, Morocco	Clay	(Morocco) Lina Qostal	(Morocco) Fatyha Berjane (Morocco) Intissar Rassif	6–1, 6–1
Winner	2.	6 July 2012	Cairo, Egypt	Clay	(Morocco) Zaineb El Houari	(Cyprus) Mara Argyriou (Belarus) Alina Zubkova	6–2, 5–7 [10–5]
Runner-up	3.	6 October 2012	Rabat, Morocco	Clay	(Morocco) Fatyha Berjane	(Egypt) Hana Mortagy (Morocco) Lina Qostal	6–3, 5–7 [10–12]
Runner-up	4.	9 March 2013	Casablanca, Morocco	Clay	(Morocco) Zaineb El Houari	(Japan) Natsumi Okamoto (Poland) Katarzyna Pyka	5–7, 7–6^{(9)} [8–10]
Runner-up	5.	5 October 2013	Rabat, Morocco	Clay	(Morocco) Zaineb El Houari	(South Africa) Theresa Alison van Zyl (Slovakia) Sandra Jamrichová	1–6, 4–6
Runner-up	6.	9 March 2013	Casablanca, Morocco	Clay	(Morocco) Lina Qostal	(Egypt) Sandra Samir (Egypt) Mayar Sherif	0–6, 2–6
Winner	7.	1 November 2014	Mohammedia, Morocco	Clay	(Namibia) Lesedi Sheya Jacobs	(Germany) Jule Niemeier (Germany) Linda Puppendahl	6–4, 6–2
