= Eastern Caribbean Billie Jean King Cup team =

Eastern Caribbean women's tennis team

The Eastern Caribbean Billie Jean King Cup team represents the member nations of the Organization of Eastern Caribbean States in Billie Jean King Cup tennis competition. They have not competed since 2002.

== History ==
Eastern Caribbean competed in its first (and thus far, only) Fed Cup in 2002, losing all five of its ties.

== See also ==
- Billie Jean King Cup
- Eastern Caribbean Davis Cup team
