= Ireland Billie Jean King Cup team =

Irish women's tennis team

Ireland
- Captain: Yvonne Doyle
- Nations Ranking: 67 ▲1 (16 November 2015)
- Colors: green & white
- First year: 1964
- Years played: 49
- Ties played (W–L): 166 (79–87)
- Years in World Group: 12 (1–12)
- Best finish: World Group 2R (1964, 1972)
- Most total wins: Gina Niland (34–19)
- Most singles wins: Gina Niland (22–14)
- Most doubles wins: Karen Nugent (16–7)
- Best doubles team: Siobhán Nicholson / Gina Niland (5–1); Yvonne Doyle / Karen Nugent (5–1)
- Most ties played: Gina Niland (42)
- Most years played: Gina Niland (12)

The Ireland Billie Jean King Cup team represents Ireland in the Billie Jean King Cup tennis competition and are governed by Tennis Ireland. They currently compete in the Europe/Africa Zone of Group III.

== History ==
Ireland competed in its first Fed Cup, as it was then known, in 1964. Their best result was reaching the round of 16 in 1972.

== Current team ==
2026 Billie Jean King Cup Europe/Africa Zone of Group III games in San Marino against San Marino, Malta & Iceland. Ireland beat Iceland 2-0 and San Marino 3-0 but lost 2-1 to Malta.

Ireland
Name	WTA Ranking	Date of Birth
Celine Simunyu	1444	July 23, 2004
Aisling O'Connor	—	April 17, 2003
Anna Bowtell	—	August 3, 1999
Sinead Lohan	—	February 10 1995

== See also ==
- Billie Jean King Cup
- Ireland Davis Cup team
- Sport in Ireland
