= Malta Billie Jean King Cup team =

National tennis team

Malta
- Captain: Elaine Genovese
- Nations Ranking: 94 (14 November 2016)
- Colors: red & white
- First year: 1986
- Years played: 27
- Ties played (W–L): 91 (29–62)
- Years in World Group: 1 (0–1)
- Best finish: Zonal Group III RR
- Most total wins: Lisa Camenzuli (36–36)
- Most singles wins: Lisa Camenzuli (17–21)
- Most doubles wins: Lisa Camenzuli (19–15)
- Best doubles team: Lisa Camenzuli / Carol Cassar-Torreggiani (9–4)
- Most ties played: Lisa Camenzuli (43)
- Most years played: Carol Cassar-Torreggiani (14); Helen Asciak (14)

The Malta Billie Jean King Cup team represents Malta in the Billie Jean King Cup tennis competition and are governed by the Malta Tennis Federation. They currently compete in the Europe/Africa Zone of Group III.

== History ==
Malta competed in its first Fed Cup in 1986. Their best result was qualifying for the 32-team main draw in their debut year.

== See also ==
- Billie Jean King Cup
- Malta Davis Cup team
