= Kenya Billie Jean King Cup team =

The Kenya Fed Cup team represents Kenya in Fed Cup tennis competition and are governed by the Kenya Lawn Tennis Association. They have not competed since 2005.

== History ==
Kenya competed in its first Fed Cup in 1991. They have won two of 25 ties all-time (vs. Cyprus in 1995 and 2005).

== See also ==
- Billie Jean King Cup
- Kenya Davis Cup team
