= Mozambique Billie Jean King Cup team =

Mozambique
- Captain: Claudia Sumaia
- ITF ranking: 101 (24 April 2017)
- First year: 2015
- Years played: 3
- Ties played (W–L): 1 (0-11)
- Best finish: Europe/Africa Zone Group III
- Most total wins: None
- Most singles wins: None
- Most doubles wins: None
- Best doubles team: No doubles wins
- Most ties played: Claudia Sumaia (11); Marieta De Lyubov Nhamitambo (11)
- Most years played: Claudia Sumaia (3); Marieta De Lyubov Nhamitambo (3)

The Mozambique Fed Cup team represents Mozambique in Fed Cup tennis competition and are governed by the Federação Moçambicana de Ténis. They have not competed since 2017.

== Current squad (2017) ==
- Ilga Adolfo Joao
- Claudia Sumaia
- Marieta De Lyubov Nhamitambo

== History ==
Mozambique competed in its first Fed Cup in 2015.

== See also ==
- Billie Jean King Cup
- Mozambique Davis Cup team
