= North Macedonia Billie Jean King Cup team =

National tennis team

North Macedonia
- Captain: Vladimir Despotovski
- ITF ranking: 77 (14 February 2019)
- Colors: red & white
- First year: 1995
- Years played: 11
- Ties played (W–L): 46 (23–23)
- Best finish: Zonal Group II RR
- Most total wins: Marina Lazarovska (14–13)
- Most singles wins: Marina Lazarovska (9–7)
- Most doubles wins: Marina Lazarovska (5–6)
- Best doubles team: Biljana Trpeska / Zdenka Videnova (3–2)
- Most ties played: Marina Lazarovska (17)
- Most years played: Marina Lazarovska (5)

The North Macedonia Billie Jean King Cup team represents North Macedonia in the Billie Jean King Cup tennis competition. It is governed by the Macedonian Tennis Federation.

== History ==
North Macedonia competed in its first Fed Cup in 1995. Their best result was earning promotion to Group I in 2000. Prior to 1992, Macedonian players represented Yugoslavia.

== Players ==
Name	Years	First	Ties	Win/Loss		
Name	Years	First	Ties	Singles	Doubles	Total
Suzi Becvinovska	1	2001	3	0–2	0–2	0–4
Mirjana Boskova	1	1995	1	0–0	1–0	1–0
Ana Buraku	3	1998	6	1–2	1–4	2–6
Biljana Dimovska	2	2000	7	3–2	2–2	5–4
Marija Elenova	2	2015	5	2–2	2–1	4–3
Lina Gjorcheska	2	2015	7	5–2	4–1	9–3
Nora Hristovska	2	2016	5	3–2	3–2	6–4
Elena Jankulovska	1	2016	1	1–0	1–0	2–0
Marina Lazarovska	5	1996	17	9–7	5–5	14–13
Elena Manevska	4	1997	8	1–1	2–5	3–6
Katarina Marinkovikj	4	2015	9	3–5	4–2	7–7
Irena Mihailova	2	1995	9	2–6	4–5	6–11
Ivona Mihailova	2	1995	7	4–3	2–3	6–6
Ana Ristevska	2	2018	5	2–0	2–1	4–1
Aleksandra Simeva	1	2019	3	1–0	2–0	3–0
Magdalena Stoilkovska	3	2015	10	4–6	6–1	10–7
Jana Tanevska	1	2018	3	0–1	0–2	0–3
Biljana Trpeska	2	1997	9	5–4	4–3	9–7
Viktorija Veselinova	1	2017	4	1–2	2–2	3–4
Zdenka Videnova	2	1997	9	2–6	3–4	5–10

== See also ==
- Billie Jean King Cup
- North Macedonia Davis Cup team
