= Egypt Billie Jean King Cup team =

Egyptian women's tennis team

Egypt Billie Jean King Cup Team
- Captain: Mohammed Wafa
- ITF ranking: 66 ▼6 (16 November 2015)
- Colors: red & black
- First year: 1986
- Years played: 28
- Ties played (W–L): 109 (49–60)
- Years in World Group: 1 (0–1)
- Best finish: World Group 1R 1986
- Most total wins: Magy Aziz (26–21)
- Most singles wins: Sandra Samir (17–14)
- Most doubles wins: Magy Aziz (10–7)
- Best doubles team: Magy Aziz / Mayar Sherif (4–0)
- Most ties played: Magy Aziz (34)
- Most years played: Sandra Samir (9)

The Egypt Billie Jean King Cup team represents Egypt in the Billie Jean King Cup tennis competition and are governed by the Egyptian Tennis Federation. They currently compete in the Europe/Africa Zone of Group III.

== History ==
Egypt competed in its first Fed Cup in 1986, but did not play again until 1994. They then competed again in 1995, but not in 1996. Since 1997, Egypt has taken part in every edition. Their best result was second place in their Group II pool in 2001 and 2003.

== Current team (2017) ==
- Sandra Samir
- Ola Abou Zekry
- Mai El Kamash
- Rana Sherif Ahmed

== See also ==
- Billie Jean King Cup
- Egypt Davis Cup team
