= Algeria Billie Jean King Cup team =

Algerian women's tennis team

Algeria
- Captain: Nabila Bouchabou
- ITF ranking: 93 ▼1 (16 November 2015)
- Colors: green & white
- First year: 1997
- Years played: 13
- Ties played (W–L): 49 (18–31)
- Best finish: Zonal Group II Promotional Play-off (2002)
- Most total wins: Amira Benaissa (9–24)
- Most singles wins: Samia Medjahdi (7–4)
- Most doubles wins: Feriel Esseghir (5–7)
- Best doubles team: Amira Benaissa & Sara Meghoufel (2-0); Lamia Hameurlaine&Samira Takourabet(2-1); Siham-Soumeya Ben Nacer& Feriel Esseghir(2-3)
- Most ties played: Amira Benaissa (22)
- Most years played: Assia Halo; Amira Benaissa (6)

The Algeria Billie Jean King Cup team represents Algeria in the Billie Jean King Cup tennis competition and is governed by the Fédération Algerienne de Tennis. The team currently competes in the Europe/Africa Zone of Group III.

== History ==
Algeria participated in its first Fed Cup in 1997. Their best result was finishing third in the Group II pool in 2001 and 2002.

== Players ==
Name	Years	First	Ties	Win/Loss		
Name	Years	First	Ties	Singles	Doubles	Total
Nihel Adjali	1	2010	1	0–0	0–1	0–1
Karima Ait Ali Yahia	1	2001	2	0–0	0–2	0–2
Yasmine Alkema	1	2009	4	0–2	0–2	0–4
Inès Bekrar	2	2019	9	5–4	3–2	8–6
Siham-Soumeya Ben Nacer	3	1998	11	4–4	2–3	6–7
Sana Ben Salah	4	2001	13	5–7	1–3	6–10
Sihem Ben Youcef	4	2000	10	2–4	1–7	3–11
Amira Benaïssa	7	2005	23	5–14	4–11	9–25
Lynda Benkaddour	4	2016	15	4–7	3–5	7–12
Fatima Zorah Bouabdallah	3	2009	10	1–8	2–2	3–10
Ouarda Bouchabou	3	1997	7	1–5	2–2	3–7
Yassamine Boudjadi	3	2018	10	6–3	4–6	10–9
Fatima Zohra Boukezzi	3	2010	5	0–1	1–3	1–4
Houria Boukholda	1	2017	1	0–0	1–0	1–0
Feriel Esseghir	4	1998	17	3–10	5–7	8–17
Assia Halo	6	2003	18	3–6	4–12	7–18
Lamia Hameurlaïne	2	1997	8	5–2	3–4	8–6
Saida Hared	1	2002	2	1–1	0–0	1–1
Inès Ibbou	1	2015	3	2–1	1–2	3–3
Djamila Khaldi	1	1999	2	0–1	1–0	1–1
Samia Medjahdi	4	2003	12	7–4	1–3	8–7
Sara Meghoufel	2	2004	4	1–0	3–1	4–1
Samira Takourabet	3	1997	6	3–1	2–2	5–3

== See also ==
- Billie Jean King Cup
- Algeria Davis Cup team
