= Morocco Billie Jean King Cup team =

National women's tennis team

Morocco
- Captain: Mehdi Tahiri
- ITF ranking: 89 (14 November 2015)
- Colors: red & Green
- First year: 1966
- Years played: 13
- Ties played (W–L): 45 (23–21)
- Years in World Group: 1 (0–1)
- Best finish: Zonal Group I RR
- Most total wins: Fatima El Allami (19–11)
- Most singles wins: Fatima El Allami (13–7)
- Most doubles wins: Nadia Lalami (8–4)
- Best doubles team: Fatima El Allami / Nadia Lalami (5–3)
- Most ties played: Nadia Lalami (21)
- Most years played: Fatima El Allami (6); Nadia Lalami (6); Habiba Ifrakh (6)

The Morocco Billie Jean King Cup team represents Morocco in the Billie Jean King Cup tennis competition and are governed by the Fédération Royale Marocaine de Tennis. They have not competed since 2003.

== History ==
Morocco competed in its first Fed Cup in 1966, but did not compete again until 1995. Their best result was winning Group II in 1999 earning promotion to Group I.

== See also ==
- Billie Jean King Cup
- Morocco Davis Cup team
