= 2022 Billie Jean King Cup Europe/Africa Zone =

Subsection of tennis competition

The 30th Europe/Africa Zone is one of three zones of regional competition in the 2022 Billie Jean King Cup.

== Group I ==
- Venue: Megasaray Tennis Academy, Antalya, Turkey (clay)
- Date: 11–16 April 2022

The eleven teams were divided into two pools of five and six teams. The nations finishing first in their pools were automatically advanced to the 2022 Billie Jean King Cup play-offs. The nations finishing 2nd in their pools took part in a play-off to determine the nation advancing to the 2022 Billie Jean King Cup play-offs. The nations finishing last and second-last in their pools took part in a relegation play-offs, with the losing nations relegated to Group II for 2023.

=== Seeding ===
Pot	Nation	Rank^{1}	Seed
1	Serbia	20	1
1	Sweden	26	2
2	Hungary	33	3
2	Croatia	34	4
3	Turkey	36	5
3	Austria	38	6
4	Estonia	39	7
4	Bulgaria	42	8
5	Slovenia	43	9
5	Denmark	54	10
5	Georgia	65	11

- ^{1}Billie Jean King Cup Rankings as of 8 November 2021

=== Pools ===
	Pool A	HUN	SRB	TUR	DEN	EST
1	Hungary (4–0)		2–1	2–1	3–0	3–0
2	Serbia (3–1)	1–2		2–1	2–1	2–1
3	Turkey (2–2)	1–2	1–2		2–1	2–1
4	Denmark (1–3)	0–3	1–2	1–2		2–1
5	Estonia (0–4)	0–3	1–2	1–2	1–2	

	Pool B	SLO	CRO	AUT	BUL	SWE	GEO
1	Slovenia (4–1)		2–1	2–1	2–1	1–2	2–1
2	Croatia (4–1)	1–2		2–1	3–0	3–0	3–0
3	Austria (3–2)	1–2	1–2		2–1	2–1	3–0
4	Bulgaria (2–3)	1–2	0–3	1–2		3–0	2–1
5	Sweden (2–3)	2–1	0–3	1–2	0–3		3–0
6	Georgia (0–5)	1–2	0–3	0–3	1–2	0–3	

=== Play-offs ===
Placing	A Team	Score	B Team
1st (Note: Both teams are promoted but will play-off for 1st place ranking points)	Hungary	2–1	Slovenia
Promotional	Serbia	0–2	Croatia
5th–6th	Turkey	0–2	Austria
7th	—N/a		Bulgaria
Relegation	Denmark	2–1	Georgia
Relegation	Estonia	1–2	Sweden

=== Final placements ===
Placing	Teams	
Promoted/First	Hungary	
Promoted/Second	Slovenia	
Promoted/Third	Croatia	
Promoted/Fourth	Serbia	
Promoted/Fifth	Austria	
Sixth	Turkey	
Seventh	Bulgaria	
Eighth	Denmark	Sweden
Relegated/Tenth	Estonia	Georgia

- Hungary, Slovenia, Croatia, Serbia, and Austria were promoted to the 2022 Billie Jean King Cup play-offs.
  - Serbia was added based on ranking (20th) when the ITF disqualified Russia and Belarus for violations of the Olympic Truce.
  - Austria was added based on ranking (38th) when Great Britain was chosen as host and automatic qualifier of the 2022 Billie Jean King Cup Finals.
- Estonia and Georgia were relegated to Europe/Africa Zone Group II in 2023.

== Group II ==
- Venue: Vierumäki, Finland (indoor hard)
- Date: 12–15 April 2022

The seven teams were divided into two pools of three and four teams. The four nations finishing 1st and 2nd in their pools took part in play-offs to determine the nations advancing to Group I in 2023. The nations finishing third took part in a relegation play-off, with the losing nations relegated to Group III for 2023, along with the nation finishing last in Group B.

=== Seeding ===
Pot	Nation	Rank^{1}	Seed
1	Greece	37	1
1	Luxembourg	45	2
2	Finland	51	3
2	Egypt	55	4
3	Norway	58	5
3	Israel	60	6
3	Lithuania	62	7

- ^{1}Billie Jean King Cup Rankings as of 8 November 2021

=== Pools ===
	Pool A	NOR	EGY	GRE
1	Norway (1–1)		2–1	1–2
2	Egypt (1–1)	1–2		2–1
3	Greece (1–1)	2–1	1–2	

	Pool B	LTU	ISR	LUX	FIN
1	Lithuania (3–0)		3–0	3–0	3–0
2	Israel (2–1)	0–3		2–1	2–1
3	Luxembourg (1–2)	0–3	1–2		2–1
4	Finland (0–3)	0–3	1–2	1–2	

=== Play-offs ===
Placing	A Team	Score	B Team
Promotional	Norway	2–1	Israel
Promotional	Egypt	2–1	Lithuania
Relegation	Greece	2–1	Luxembourg
Relegation	—N/a		Finland

=== Final placements ===
Placing	Teams	
Promoted/First	Norway	Egypt
Third	Israel	Lithuania
Fifth	Greece	
Relegated/Sixth	Luxembourg	
Relegated/Seventh	Finland	

- Norway and Egypt were promoted to Europe/Africa Zone Group I in 2023.
- Finland and Luxembourg were relegated to Europe/Africa Zone Group III in 2023.

== Group III ==
- Venue 1: Bellevue Tennis Club, Ulcinj, Montenegro (clay)
- Venue 2: Tennis Club Jug, Skopje, North Macedonia (clay)
- Dates: 7–11 June 2022 (Ulcinj) / 5–10 July 2022 (Skopje)

The twenty-eight nations were split into two events. Event A was held in Ulcinj, whilst Event B was held in Skopje. In Ulcinj, the eleven teams were split into two pools of four nations and one pool of three nations. The top teams in each group will contest a two stage knock-out draw, with one team earning promotion to Europe/Africa Zone Group II in 2023. In Skopje, the seventeen teams were split into two pools of four nations and three pools of three nations. An eight-team knock-out draw made up of the top team from each group and the two best 2nd place teams will determine the one nation promoted to Europe/Africa Zone Group II in 2023.

=== Seeding ===
Ulcinj

Pot	Nation	Rank^{1}	Seed
1	Montenegro	66	1
1	Cyprus	69	2
1	Armenia	77	3
2	Bosnia and Herzegovina	78	4
2	Algeria	83	5
2	Morocco	92	6
3	Azerbaijan	95	7
3	Nigeria	97	8
3	Moldova	101	9
3	Ghana	NR	–
3	Mauritius	NR	–

- ^{1}Billie Jean King Cup Rankings as of 19 April 2022

Skopje

Pot	Nation	Rank^{1}	Seed
1	Ireland	67	1
1	Malta	68	2
1	South Africa	71	3
1	Kosovo	76	4
2	Portugal	79	5
2	North Macedonia	86	6
2	Iceland	94	7
2	Namibia	103	8
3	Albania	105	9
3	Kenya	106	10
3	Uganda	111	11
3	Botswana	NR	–
3	Burundi	NR	–
3	Seychelles	NR	–

- ^{1}Billie Jean King Cup Rankings as of 19 April 2022

=== Pools ===
==== Event A (Ulcinj) ====
	Pool A (Ulcinj)	BIH	MNE	NGR
1	Bosnia and Herzegovina (2–0)		2–0	3–0
2	Montenegro (1–1)	0–2		3–0
3	Nigeria (0–2)	0–3	0–3	

	Pool B (Ulcinj)	ALG	CYP	GHA	AZE
1	Algeria (3–0)		2–1	3–0	3–0
2	Cyprus (2–1)	1–2		3–0	3–0
3	Ghana (1–2)	0–3	0–3		2–0
4	Azerbaijan (0–3)	0–3	0–3	0–2	

	Pool C (Ulcinj)	MAR	MDA	ARM	MRI
1	Morocco (3–0)		3–0	2–0	3–0
2	Moldova (2–1)	0–3		2–1	2–0
3	Armenia (1–2)	0–2	1–2		2–1
4	Mauritius (0–3)	0–3	0–2	1–2	

==== Event B (Skopje) ====
	Pool A (Skopje)	IRL	ISL	SEY
1	Ireland (2–0)		3–0	3–0
2	Iceland (1–1)	0–3		3–0
3	Seychelles (0–2)	0–3	0–3	

	Pool B (Skopje)	POR	MLT	BDI
1	Portugal (2–0)		2–1	3–0
2	Malta (1–1)	1–2		2–1
3	Burundi (0–2)	0–3	1–2	

	Pool C (Skopje)	MKD	RSA	BOT	UGA
1	North Macedonia (3–0)		2–1	3–0	3–0
2	South Africa (2–1)	1–2		3–0	3–0
3	Botswana (1–2)	0–3	0–3		3–0
4	Uganda (0–3)	0–3	0–3	0–3	

	Pool D (Skopje)	KOS	ALB	KEN	NAM
1	Kosovo (3–0)		2–1	3–0	3–0
2	Albania (2–1)	1–2		2–1	3–0
3	Kenya (1–2)	0–3	1–2		3–0
4	Namibia (0–3)	0–3	0–3	0–3	

=== Play-offs ===
==== Promotional play-offs ====
Semifinals; 10 June 2022 (Ulcinj); 8 July 2022 (Skopje)
A	Bosnia/Herzegovina
Bye
C	Morocco	2
B	Algeria	0
A	Ireland	1
B	Portugal	2
C	North Macedonia	2
D	Kosovo	0

Promotional play-offs 11 June 2022 (Ulcinj); 10 July 2022 (Skopje)
A	Bosnia/Herzegovina	2
C	Morocco	0
B	Portugal	2
C	North Macedonia	1

3rd-place play-off 9 July 2022 (Skopje)
A	Ireland	NP
D	Kosovo	NP

==== 4th–6th (Ulcinj) and 5th–8th (Skopje) place play-offs ====
4th–6th-place play-offs (Ulcinj); 5th–8th-place play-offs (Skopje); 10 June 2022 (Ulcinj); 8 July 2022 (Skopje)
A	Montenegro
Bye
C	Moldova	2
B	Cyprus	1
B	Malta	3
A	Iceland	0
D	Albania	0
C	South Africa	2

4th-place play-off (Ulcinj); 5th-place play-off (Skopje); 11 June 2022 (Ulcinj); 9 July 2022 (Skopje)
A	Montenegro	1
C	Moldova	2
B	Malta	NP
C	South Africa	NP

7th-place play-off 9 July 2022 (Skopje)
A	Iceland	NP
D	Albania	NP

==== 7th–9th (Ulcinj) and 9th–12th (Skopje) place play-offs ====
7th–9th-place play-offs (Ulcinj); 9th–12th-place play-offs (Skopje); 10 June 2022 (Ulcinj); 8 July 2022 (Skopje)
C	Armenia
Bye
B	Ghana	2
A	Nigeria	1
D	Kenya	0
C	Botswana	2
B	Burundi	2
A	Seychelles	0

7th-place play-off (Ulcinj); 9th-place play-off (Skopje); 11 June 2022 (Ulcinj); 9 July 2022 (Skopje)
C	Armenia	2
B	Ghana	1
C	Botswana	NP
B	Burundi	NP

11th-place play-off 9 July 2022 (Skopje)
D	Kenya	NP
A	Seychelles	NP

==== 10th-place play-off (Ulcinj) ====
10th-place play-off 10 June 2022 (Ulcinj)
B	Azerbaijan	0
C	Mauritius	2

==== 13th-place play-off (Skopje) ====
13th-place play-off 8 July 2022 (Skopje)
C	Uganda	w/o
D	Namibia

=== Final placements ===
Placing	Teams		
Promoted/First	Bosnia and Herzegovina	Portugal	
Second	Morocco	North Macedonia	
Third	Algeria	Ireland	Kosovo
Fourth	Moldova		
Fifth	Montenegro	Malta	South Africa
Sixth	Cyprus		
Seventh	Armenia	Iceland	Albania
Eighth	Ghana		
Ninth	Nigeria	Botswana	Burundi
Tenth	Mauritius		
Eleventh	Azerbaijan	Kenya	Seychelles
Thirteenth	Uganda		
Fourteenth	Namibia		

- Bosnia and Herzegovina and Portugal were promoted to Europe/Africa Zone Group II in 2023.
