= 2022 Billie Jean King Cup Europe/Africa Zone Group III – play-offs =

Subsection of tennis competition

The playoffs of the 2022 Billie Jean King Cup Europe/Africa Zone Group III were the final stages of the Group III zonal competition involving teams from Europe and Africa. Using on their positions determined in their pools, the twenty-one teams faced off to determine their placing in the 2022 Billie Jean King Cup Europe/Africa Zone Group III. The top two teams advanced to the Billie Jean King Cup Europe/Africa Zone Group II.

Placing	Pool A (Ulcinj)	Pool B (Ulcinj)	Pool C (Ulcinj)	Pool A (Skopje)	Pool B (Skopje)	Pool C (Skopje)	Pool D (Skopje)
1	Bosnia and Herzegovina	Algeria	Morocco	Ireland	Portugal	North Macedonia	Kosovo
2	Montenegro	Cyprus	Moldova	Iceland	Malta	South Africa	Albania
3	Nigeria	Ghana	Armenia	Seychelles	Burundi	Botswana	Kenya
4	—N/a	Azerbaijan	Mauritius	—N/a	—N/a	Uganda	Namibia

== Promotional play-offs ==
The first placed teams of each pool were drawn in head-to-head rounds. The winners advanced to Group II in 2023.

=== Semifinals ===
==== Morocco vs. Algeria ====
Morocco
2
Bellevue Tennis Club, Ulcinj, Montenegro
10 June 2022
Clay

Algeria
0

			1	2	3
1	(Morocco) (Algeria)	Yasmine Kabbaj; Inès Bekrar	6; 1	6; 3
2	(Morocco) (Algeria)	Aya El Aouni; Inès Ibbou	4; 5			retired
3	(Morocco) (Algeria)	Rania Azziz / Yasmine Kabbaj; Amira Benaïssa / Inès Ibbou				not played

==== Ireland vs. Portugal ====
Ireland
1
Tennis Club Jub, Skopje, North Macedonia
8 July 2022
Clay

Portugal
2

			1	2	3
1	(Republic of Ireland) (Portugal)	Carragh Courtney; Matilde Jorge	6; 3	4; 6	7^{7} 6^{2}
2	(Republic of Ireland) (Portugal)	Celine Simunyu; Francisca Jorge	1; 6	0; 6
3	(Republic of Ireland) (Portugal)	Kate Gardiner / Shauna Heffernan; Francisca Jorge / Matilde Jorge	0; 6	0; 6

==== North Macedonia vs. Kosovo ====
North Macedonia
2
Tennis Club Jub, Skopje, North Macedonia
8 July 2022
Clay

Kosovo
0

			1	2	3
1	(North Macedonia) (Kosovo)	Magdalena Stoilkovska; Donika Bashota	6; 0	6; 1
2	(North Macedonia) (Kosovo)	Lina Gjorcheska; Adrijana Lekaj	6; 2	6; 2
3	(North Macedonia) (Kosovo)	Lina Gjorcheska / Magdalena Stoilkovska; Donika Bashota / Adrijana Lekaj				not played

=== Promotional play-offs ===
==== Bosnia and Herzegovina vs. Morocco ====
Bosnia and Herzegovina
2
Bellevue Tennis Club, Ulcinj, Montenegro
11 June 2022
Clay

Morocco
0

			1	2	3
1	(Bosnia and Herzegovina) (Morocco)	Nefisa Berberović; Yasmine Kabbaj	6; 1	7; 5
2	(Bosnia and Herzegovina) (Morocco)	Dea Herdželaš; Aya El Aouni	6; 2	6; 4
3	(Bosnia and Herzegovina) (Morocco)	Anastasija Ignjatić / Suana Tucaković; Rania Azziz / Yasmine Kabbaj				not played

==== Portugal vs. North Macedonia ====
Portugal
2
Tennis Club Jub, Skopje, North Macedonia
10 July 2022
Clay

North Macedonia
1

			1	2	3
1	(Portugal) (North Macedonia)	Matilde Jorge; Magdalena Stoilkovska	7^{7} 6^{4}	6; 3
2	(Portugal) (North Macedonia)	Francisca Jorge; Lina Gjorcheska	1; 6	1; 6
3	(Portugal) (North Macedonia)	Francisca Jorge / Matilde Jorge; Lina Gjorcheska / Magdalena Stoilkovska	6; 4	4; 6	6; 4

=== 3rd place play-off (Skopje) ===
==== Ireland vs. Kosovo ====
Ireland

Tennis Club Jub, Skopje, North Macedonia
9 July 2022
Clay

Kosovo

			1	2	3
1	(Republic of Ireland) (Kosovo)	N/A; N/A				not played
2	(Republic of Ireland) (Kosovo)	N/A; N/A				not played
3	(Republic of Ireland) (Kosovo)	N/A / N/A; N/A / N/A				not played

== 4th–6th (Ulcinj) and 5th–8th (Skopje) place play-offs ==
The second placed teams of each pool were drawn in head-to-head rounds to find the 4th–6th (Ulcinj) and 5th–8th (Skopje) placed teams.

=== Semifinals ===
==== Moldova vs. Cyprus ====
Moldova
2
Bellevue Tennis Club, Ulcinj, Montenegro
10–11 June 2022
Clay

Cyprus
1

			1	2	3
1	(Moldova) (Cyprus)	Daniela Ciobanu; Anna Demirtzi	6; 3	6; 2
2	(Moldova) (Cyprus)	Arina Gamretkaia; Klio Maria Ioannou	1; 6	4; 6
3	(Moldova) (Cyprus)	Daniela Ciobanu / Arina Gamretkaia; Maria Constantinou / Victoria Savvides	6; 1	6; 1

==== Malta vs. Iceland ====
Malta
3
Tennis Club Jub, Skopje, North Macedonia
8 July 2022
Clay

Iceland
0

			1	2	3
1	(Malta) (Iceland)	Elaine Genovese; Hera Brynjarsdóttir	6; 0	6; 0
2	(Malta) (Iceland)	Helene Pellicano; Anna Soffia Grönholm	6; 3	6; 1
3	(Malta) (Iceland)	Francesca Curmi / Emma Montebello; Hera Brynjarsdóttir / Anna Soffia Grönholm	6; 0	6; 2

==== Albania vs. South Africa ====
Albania
0
Tennis Club Jub, Skopje, North Macedonia
8 July 2022
Clay

South Africa
2

			1	2	3
1	(Albania) (South Africa)	Kristal Dule; Heike Janse van Vuuren	0; 6	0; 6
2	(Albania) (South Africa)	Gresi Bajri; Chanel Simmonds	1; 6	2; 6
3	(Albania) (South Africa)	Gresi Bajri / Kristal Dule; Ilze Hattingh / Heike Janse van Vuuren				not played

=== 4th place play-off (Ulcinj) ===
==== Montenegro vs. Moldova ====
Montenegro
1
Bellevue Tennis Club, Ulcinj, Montenegro
11 June 2022
Clay

Moldova
2

			1	2	3
1	(Montenegro) (Moldova)	Petra Mirković; Arina Gamretkaia	3; 6	2; 6
2	(Montenegro) (Moldova)	Iva Lakić; Renata Farima	4; 2			retired
3	(Montenegro) (Moldova)	Iva Lakić / Petra Mirković; Arina Gamretkaia / Ecaterina Visnevscaia	6; 4	6^{3} 7^{7}	2; 6

=== 5th place play-off (Skopje) ===
==== Malta vs. South Africa ====
Malta

Tennis Club Jub, Skopje, North Macedonia
9 July 2022
Clay

South Africa

			1	2	3
1	(Malta) (South Africa)	N/A; N/A				not played
2	(Malta) (South Africa)	N/A; N/A				not played
3	(Malta) (South Africa)	N/A / N/A; N/A / N/A				not played

=== 7th place play-off (Skopje) ===
==== Iceland vs. Albania ====
Iceland

Tennis Club Jub, Skopje, North Macedonia
9 July 2022
Clay

Albania

			1	2	3
1	(Iceland) (Albania)	N/A; N/A				not played
2	(Iceland) (Albania)	N/A; N/A				not played
3	(Iceland) (Albania)	N/A / N/A; N/A / N/A				not played

== 7th–9th (Ulcinj) and 9th–12th (Skopje) place play-offs ==
The third placed teams of each pool were drawn in head-to-head rounds to find the 7th–9th (Ulcinj) and 9th–12th (Skopje) placed teams.

=== Semifinals ===
==== Ghana vs. Nigeria ====
Ghana
2
Bellevue Tennis Club, Ulcinj, Montenegro
10 June 2022
Clay

Nigeria
1

			1	2	3
1	(Ghana) (Nigeria)	Elizabeth Kapari Bagerbaseh; Ofure Osabuohien	6; 0	6; 0
2	(Ghana) (Nigeria)	Ruth Crawford; Adesuwa Osabuohien	1; 6	3; 6
3	(Ghana) (Nigeria)	Elizabeth Kapari Bagerbaseh / Ruth Crawford; Adetayo Adetunji / Adesuwa Osabuohien	6; 3	2; 6	6; 4

==== Kenya vs. Botswana ====
Kenya
0
Tennis Club Jub, Skopje, North Macedonia
8 July 2022
Clay

Botswana
2

			1	2	3
1	(Kenya) (Botswana)	Roselida Asumwa; Chelsea Chakanyuka	0; 6	3; 6
2	(Kenya) (Botswana)	Alicia Owegi; Ekua Youri	1; 6	2; 6
3	(Kenya) (Botswana)	Alicia Owegi / Cynthia Wanjala; Chelsea Chakanyuka / Ekua Youri				not played

==== Burundi vs. Seychelles ====
Burundi
2
Tennis Club Jub, Skopje, North Macedonia
8 July 2022
Clay

Seychelles
0

			1	2	3
1	(Burundi) (Seychelles)	Laura Syori; Fatime Kanté	6; 1	6; 0
2	(Burundi) (Seychelles)	Sada Nahimana; Marie-May Isnard	6; 0	6; 0
3	(Burundi) (Seychelles)	Sada Nahimana / Laura Syori; Cylvie Delpech / Marie-May Isnard				not played

=== 7th place play-off (Ulcinj) ===
==== Armenia vs. Ghana ====
Armenia
2
Bellevue Tennis Club, Ulcinj, Montenegro
11 June 2022
Clay

Ghana
1

			1	2	3
1	(Armenia) (Ghana)	Arevik Tumanyan; Elizabeth Kapari Bagerbaseh	6^{1} 7^{7}	4; 6
2	(Armenia) (Ghana)	Ani Amiraghyan; Ruth Crawford	6; 3	6; 2
3	(Armenia) (Ghana)	Gabriella Akopyan / Ani Amiraghyan; Ruth Crawford / Naa Anyema McKorley	6; 2	6; 2

=== 9th place play-off (Skopje) ===
==== Botswana vs. Burundi ====
Botswana

Tennis Club Jub, Skopje, North Macedonia
9 July 2022
Clay

Burundi

			1	2	3
1	(Botswana) (Burundi)	N/A; N/A				not played
2	(Botswana) (Burundi)	N/A; N/A				not played
3	(Botswana) (Burundi)	N/A / N/A; N/A / N/A				not played

=== 11th place play-off (Skopje) ===
==== Kenya vs. Seychelles ====
Kenya

Tennis Club Jub, Skopje, North Macedonia
9 July 2022
Clay

Seychelles

			1	2	3
1	(Kenya) (Seychelles)	N/A; N/A				not played
2	(Kenya) (Seychelles)	N/A; N/A				not played
3	(Kenya) (Seychelles)	N/A / N/A; N/A / N/A				not played

== 10th place play-offs ==
The fourth placed teams of each pool in Ulcinj were drawn in a head-to-head round to find the 10th placed team.

=== Azerbaijan vs. Mauritius ===
Azerbaijan
0
Bellevue Tennis Club, Ulcinj, Montenegro
10 June 2022
Clay

Mauritius
2

			1	2	3
1	(Azerbaijan) (Mauritius)	Lala Eyvazova; Zara Lennon	0; 6	0; 6
2	(Azerbaijan) (Mauritius)	Aydan Ibrahimova; Tippi Dalle-Grave	2; 6	0; 6
3	(Azerbaijan) (Mauritius)	Lala Eyvazova / Aydan Ibrahimova; Tippi Dalle-Grave / Shannon Wong Hon Chan				not played

== 13th place play-offs ==
The fourth placed teams of each pool in Skopje were drawn in a head-to-head round to find the 13th placed team.

=== Uganda vs. Namibia ===
Uganda
3
Tennis Club Jub, Skopje, North Macedonia
8 July 2022
Clay

Namibia
0

			1	2	3
1	(Uganda) (Namibia)	N/A; N/A				w/o
2	(Uganda) (Namibia)	N/A; N/A				w/o
3	(Uganda) (Namibia)	N/A / N/A; N/A / N/A				w/o

== Final placements ==
Placing	Teams		
Promoted/First	Bosnia and Herzegovina	Portugal	
Second	Morocco	North Macedonia	
Third	Algeria	Ireland	Kosovo
Fourth	Moldova		
Fifth	Montenegro	Malta	South Africa
Sixth	Cyprus		
Seventh	Armenia	Iceland	Albania
Eighth	Ghana		
Ninth	Nigeria	Botswana	Burundi
Tenth	Mauritius		
Eleventh	Azerbaijan	Kenya	Seychelles
Thirteenth	Uganda		
Fourteenth	Namibia		

- Bosnia and Herzegovina and Portugal were promoted to Europe/Africa Zone Group II in 2023.
