= 2023 Billie Jean King Cup Europe/Africa Zone =

Subsection of tennis competition

The 31st Europe/Africa Zone is one of three zones of regional competition in the 2023 Billie Jean King Cup.

== Group I ==
- Venue: Megasaray Tennis Academy, Antalya, Turkey (clay)
- Date: 10–15 April 2023

The eleven teams were divided into two pools of five and six teams. Both pool winners were promoted, but played for overall position. Second-placed teams played for the third promotion spot. Positional play-off were played between 3rd–5th place finishers. Two teams were relegated.

=== Seeding ===
Nation	Rank^{1}	Seed
Latvia	18	1
Serbia	23	2
Hungary	25	3
Sweden	28	4
Croatia	29	5
Turkey	36	6
Bulgaria	42	7
Netherlands	40	8
Egypt	51	9
Denmark	55	10
Norway	58	11

- ^{1}Billie Jean King Cup Rankings as of 16 November 2022

=== Pools ===
	Pool A	HUN	NED	TUR	LAT	EGY
1	Hungary (3–1)		3–0	1–2	2–1	3–0
2	Netherlands (3–1)	0–3		2–1	3–0	3–0
3	Turkey (3–1)	2–1	1–2		3–0	2–1
4	Latvia (1–3)	1–2	0–3	0–3		3–0
5	Egypt (0–4)	0–3	0–3	1–2	0–3	

	Pool B	SWE	SRB	BUL	NOR	DEN	CRO
1	Sweden (4–1)		2–1	1–2	3–0	2–1	3–0
2	Serbia (4–1)	1–2		2–1	2–1	3–0	3–0
3	Bulgaria (3–2)	2–1	1–2		1–2	2–1	3–0
4	Norway (2–3)	0–3	1–2	2–1		2–1	0–3
5	Denmark (1–4)	1–2	0–3	1–2	1–2		2–1
6	Croatia (1–4)	0–3	0–3	0–3	3–0	1–2	

=== Pool A ===
Pool A was one of two pools in the Europe/Africa zone of the 2023 Billie Jean King Cup. Five teams competed in a round robin competition, with the top teams and the bottom team proceeding to their respective sections of the play-offs: the top teams played for advancement to 2023 Billie Jean King Cup Play-offs.

==== Standings ====
		HUN	NED	TUR	LAT	EGY	RR; W–L	Set; W–L	Game; W–L	Standings
3	Hungary		3–0	1–2	2–1	3–0	9–3	18–9 (67%)	143–101 (59%)	1
8	Netherlands	0–3		2–1	3–0	3–0	8–4	17–11 (61%)	140–108 (56%)	2
6	Turkey	2–1	1–2		3–0	2–1	8–4	19–9 (68%)	143–108 (57%)	3
1	Latvia	1–2	0–3	0–3		3–0	4–8	9–17 (32%)	101–134 (43%)	4
9	Egypt	0–3	0–3	1–2	0–3		1–11	4–23 (15%)	81–157 (34%)	5

Standings are determined by: 1. number of wins; 2. number of matches; 3. in two-team ties, head-to-head records; 4. in three-team ties, (a) percentage of matches won (head-to-head records if two teams remain tied), then (b) percentage of sets won (head-to-head records if two teams remain tied), then (c) percentage of games won (head-to-head records if two teams remain tied), then (d) Billie Jean King Cup rankings.

==== Latvia vs. Netherlands ====
Latvia
0
Megasaray Tennis Academy, Antalya, Turkey
10 April 2023
Clay

Netherlands
3

			1	2	3
1	(Latvia) (Netherlands)	Diāna Marcinkēviča; Lexie Stevens	3; 6	5; 7
2	(Latvia) (Netherlands)	Daniela Vismane; Lesley Pattinama Kerkhove	3; 6	7^{7} 6^{2}	3; 6
3	(Latvia) (Netherlands)	Adelina Lachinova / Beatrise Zeltiņa; Bibiane Schoofs / Demi Schuurs	2; 6	1; 6

==== Turkey vs. Egypt ====
Turkey
2
Megasaray Tennis Academy, Antalya, Turkey
10 April 2023
Clay

Egypt
1

			1	2	3
1	(Turkey) (Egypt)	Çağla Büyükakçay; Merna Refaat	6; 3	6; 1
2	(Turkey) (Egypt)	İpek Öz; Sandra Samir	4; 6	6; 2	3; 6
3	(Turkey) (Egypt)	Berfu Cengiz / İpek Öz; Sandra Samir / Rana Sherif Ahmed	6; 2	7^{7} 6^{5}

==== Hungary vs. Egypt ====
Hungary
3
Megasaray Tennis Academy, Antalya, Turkey
11 April 2023
Clay

Egypt
0

			1	2	3
1	(Hungary) (Egypt)	Dalma Gálfi; Lamis Alhussein Abdel Aziz	6; 1	6; 3
2	(Hungary) (Egypt)	Anna Bondár; Sandra Samir	6; 1	6; 2
3	(Hungary) (Egypt)	Réka Luca Jani / Amarissa Kiara Tóth; Lamis Alhussein Abdel Aziz / Rana Sherif Ahmed	6; 1	6; 2

==== Turkey vs. Netherlands ====
Turkey
1
Megasaray Tennis Academy, Antalya, Turkey
11 April 2023
Clay

Netherlands
2

			1	2	3
1	(Turkey) (Netherlands)	Çağla Büyükakçay; Suzan Lamens	4; 6	6; 2	0; 6
2	(Turkey) (Netherlands)	Zeynep Sönmez; Lesley Pattinama Kerkhove	6; 3	6; 3
3	(Turkey) (Netherlands)	Berfu Cengiz / İpek Öz; Suzan Lamens / Bibiane Schoofs	0; 6	1; 6

==== Latvia vs. Egypt ====
Latvia
3
Megasaray Tennis Academy, Antalya, Turkey
12 April 2023
Clay

Egypt
0

			1	2	3
1	(Latvia) (Egypt)	Diāna Marcinkēviča; Lamis Alhussein Abdel Aziz	7^{8} 6^{6}	7; 5
2	(Latvia) (Egypt)	Daniela Vismane; Sandra Samir	6; 1	6; 1
3	(Latvia) (Egypt)	Adelina Lachinova / Beatrise Zeltiņa; Merna Refaat / Rana Sherif Ahmed	4; 6	6; 2	6; 3

==== Hungary vs. Turkey ====
Hungary
1
Megasaray Tennis Academy, Antalya, Turkey
12 April 2023
Clay

Turkey
2

			1	2	3
1	(Hungary) (Turkey)	Dalma Gálfi; Zeynep Sönmez	3; 6	4; 6
2	(Hungary) (Turkey)	Anna Bondár; İpek Öz	4; 6	6; 4	7; 5
3	(Hungary) (Turkey)	Anna Bondár / Dalma Gálfi; Berfu Cengiz / İpek Öz	7^{7} 6^{4}	4; 6	2; 6

==== Latvia vs. Hungary ====
Latvia
1
Megasaray Tennis Academy, Antalya, Turkey
13 April 2023
Clay

Hungary
2

			1	2	3
1	(Latvia) (Hungary)	Diāna Marcinkēviča; Natália Szabanin	1; 6	6^{2} 7^{7}
2	(Latvia) (Hungary)	Daniela Vismane; Réka Luca Jani	6; 2	6; 3
3	(Latvia) (Hungary)	Diāna Marcinkēviča / Daniela Vismane; Anna Bondár / Dalma Gálfi	1; 6	2; 6

==== Netherlands vs. Egypt ====
Netherlands
3
Megasaray Tennis Academy, Antalya, Turkey
13 April 2023
Clay

Egypt
0

			1	2	3
1	(Netherlands) (Egypt)	Suzan Lamens; Merna Refaat	6; 0	6; 2
2	(Netherlands) (Egypt)	Lesley Pattinama Kerkhove; Sandra Samir	7^{7} 6^{2}	3; 6	6; 1
3	(Netherlands) (Egypt)	Suzan Lamens / Demi Schuurs; Merna Refaat / Sandra Samir	6; 1	7; 5

==== Latvia vs. Turkey ====
Latvia
0
Megasaray Tennis Academy, Antalya, Turkey
14 April 2023
Clay

Turkey
3

			1	2	3
1	(Latvia) (Turkey)	Beatrise Zeltiņa; Çağla Büyükakçay	6^{5} 7^{7}	3; 6
2	(Latvia) (Turkey)	Diāna Marcinkēviča; İpek Öz	1; 6	2; 6
3	(Latvia) (Turkey)	Adelina Lachinova / Beatrise Zeltiņa; Berfu Cengiz / İpek Öz	0; 6	1; 6

==== Hungary vs. Netherlands ====
Hungary
3
Megasaray Tennis Academy, Antalya, Turkey
14 April 2023
Clay

Netherlands
0

			1	2	3
1	(Hungary) (Netherlands)	Dalma Gálfi; Suzan Lamens	6; 4	6; 3
2	(Hungary) (Netherlands)	Anna Bondár; Lesley Pattinama Kerkhove	6; 3	6; 3
3	(Hungary) (Netherlands)	Anna Bondár / Dalma Gálfi; Suzan Lamens / Bibiane Schoofs	4; 6	6; 3	6; 2

=== Pool B ===
Pool B of the 2023 Billie Jean King Cup Europe/Africa Zone Group I was one of two pools in the Europe/Africa zone. Six teams competed in a round robin competition, with the top teams and the bottom team proceeding to their respective sections: the top teams played for advancement to 2023 Billie Jean King Cup Play-offs.

==== Standings ====
		SWE	SRB	BUL	NOR	DEN	CRO	RR; W–L	Set; W–L	Game; W–L	Standings
4	Sweden		2–1	1–2	3–0	2–1	3–0	11–4	24–13 (65%)	203–168 (55%)	1
2	Serbia	1–2		2–1	2–1	3–0	3–0	11–4	25–10 (71%)	186–137 (58%)	2
7	Bulgaria	2–1	1–2		1–2	2–1	3–0	9–6	21–19 (53%)	180–184 (49%)	3
11	Norway	0–3	1–3	2–1		2–1	0–3	5–10	13–21 (38%)	150–165 (48%)	4
10	Denmark	1–2	0–3	1–2	1–2		2–1	5–10	13–21 (38%)	133–168 (44%)	5
5	Croatia	0–3	0–3	0–3	3–0	1–2		4–11	12–24 (33%)	164–194 (46%)	6

Standings are determined by: 1. number of wins; 2. number of matches; 3. in two-team ties, head-to-head records; 4. in three-team ties, (a) percentage of matches won (head-to-head records if two teams remain tied), then (b) percentage of sets won (head-to-head records if two teams remain tied), then (c) percentage of games won (head-to-head records if two teams remain tied), then (d) Billie Jean King Cup rankings.

==== Serbia vs. Bulgaria ====
Serbia
2
Megasaray Tennis Academy, Antalya, Turkey
10 April 2023
Clay

Bulgaria
1

			1	2	3
1	(Serbia) (Bulgaria)	Mia Ristić; Denislava Glushkova	6; 2	6; 2
2	(Serbia) (Bulgaria)	Lola Radivojević; Isabella Shinikova	3; 6	6; 3	6; 2
3	(Serbia) (Bulgaria)	Katarina Kozarov / Lola Radivojević; Lia Karatancheva / Gergana Topalova	6; 2	3; 6	2; 6

==== Sweden vs. Norway ====
Sweden
3
Megasaray Tennis Academy, Antalya, Turkey
10 April 2023
Clay

Norway
0

			1	2	3
1	(Sweden) (Norway)	Caijsa Hennemann; Ulrikke Eikeri	4; 6	7; 5	6; 4
2	(Sweden) (Norway)	Rebecca Peterson; Malene Helgø	6; 4	6; 4
3	(Sweden) (Norway)	Jacqueline Cabaj Awad / Kajsa Rinaldo Persson; Emilie Elde / Lilly Elida Håseth	6; 0	6; 3

==== Croatia vs. Denmark ====
Croatia
1
Megasaray Tennis Academy, Antalya, Turkey
10 April 2023
Clay

Denmark
2

			1	2	3
1	(Croatia) (Denmark)	Petra Marčinko; Johanne Svendsen	2; 6	7; 5	7; 5
2	(Croatia) (Denmark)	Antonia Ružić; Clara Tauson	6^{6} 7^{8}	1; 6
3	(Croatia) (Denmark)	Petra Marčinko / Tara Würth; Rebecca Munk Mortensen / Johanne Svendsen	3; 6	5; 7

==== Serbia vs. Norway ====
Serbia
2
Megasaray Tennis Academy, Antalya, Turkey
11 April 2023
Clay

Norway
1

			1	2	3
1	(Serbia) (Norway)	Mia Ristić; Ulrikke Eikeri	6; 4	6; 4
2	(Serbia) (Norway)	Lola Radivojević; Malene Helgø	7^{7} 6^{4}	7; 5
3	(Serbia) (Norway)	Katarina Kozarov / Mia Ristić; Ulrikke Eikeri / Malene Helgø	3; 6	2; 6

==== Sweden vs. Denmark ====
Sweden
2
Megasaray Tennis Academy, Antalya, Turkey
11 April 2023
Clay

Denmark
1

			1	2	3
1	(Sweden) (Denmark)	Caijsa Hennemann; Rebecca Munk Mortensen	2; 6	6; 1	6; 2
2	(Sweden) (Denmark)	Rebecca Peterson; Clara Tauson	6; 2	2; 6	4; 6
3	(Sweden) (Denmark)	Caijsa Hennemann / Kajsa Rinaldo Persson; Rebecca Munk Mortensen / Johanne Svendsen	6; 3	6; 2

==== Croatia vs. Bulgaria ====
Croatia
0
Megasaray Tennis Academy, Antalya, Turkey
11 April 2023
Clay

Bulgaria
3

			1	2	3
1	(Croatia) (Bulgaria)	Petra Marčinko; Lia Karatancheva	6; 4	3; 6	3; 6
2	(Croatia) (Bulgaria)	Tara Würth; Gergana Topalova	4; 6	6; 2	3; 6
3	(Croatia) (Bulgaria)	Lucija Ćirić Bagarić / Antonia Ružić; Isabella Shinikova / Julia Terziyska	6^{4} 7^{7}	6; 4	3; 6

==== Serbia vs. Croatia ====
Serbia
3
Megasaray Tennis Academy, Antalya, Turkey
12 April 2023
Clay

Croatia
0

			1	2	3
1	(Serbia) (Croatia)	Mia Ristić; Antonia Ružić	6; 4	6; 3
2	(Serbia) (Croatia)	Lola Radivojević; Tara Würth	6; 2	6^{5} 7^{7}	7; 5
3	(Serbia) (Croatia)	Olga Danilović / Katarina Kozarov; Lucija Ćirić Bagarić / Tara Würth	6; 4	6; 1

==== Sweden vs. Bulgaria ====
Sweden
1
Megasaray Tennis Academy, Antalya, Turkey
12 April 2023
Clay

Bulgaria
2

			1	2	3
1	(Sweden) (Bulgaria)	Kajsa Rinaldo Persson; Lia Karatancheva	6^{11} 7^{13}	6^{4} 7^{7}
2	(Sweden) (Bulgaria)	Caijsa Hennemann; Gergana Topalova	6; 1	5; 7	3; 6
3	(Sweden) (Bulgaria)	Jacqueline Cabaj Awad / Caijsa Hennemann; Isabella Shinikova / Julia Terziyska	7^{8} 6^{6}	4; 6	7; 5

==== Denmark vs. Norway ====
Denmark
1
Megasaray Tennis Academy, Antalya, Turkey
12 April 2023
Clay

Norway
2

			1	2	3
1	(Denmark) (Norway)	Rebecca Munk Mortensen; Ulrikke Eikeri	6; 3	6; 4
2	(Denmark) (Norway)	Johanne Svendsen; Malene Helgø	4; 6	4; 6
3	(Denmark) (Norway)	Rebecca Munk Mortensen / Johanne Svendsen; Ulrikke Eikeri / Malene Helgø	6^{8} 7^{10}	3; 6

==== Serbia vs. Denmark ====
Serbia
3
Megasaray Tennis Academy, Antalya, Turkey
13 April 2023
Clay

Denmark
0

			1	2	3
1	(Serbia) (Denmark)	Mia Ristić; Sarafina Olivia Hansen	6; 2	6; 3
2	(Serbia) (Denmark)	Lola Radivojević; Rebecca Munk Mortensen	6; 4	6; 0
3	(Serbia) (Denmark)	Olga Danilović / Katarina Kozarov; Sarafina Olivia Hansen / Natacha Schou	6; 0	6; 3

==== Sweden vs. Croatia ====
Sweden
3
Megasaray Tennis Academy, Antalya, Turkey
13 April 2023
Clay

Croatia
0

			1	2	3
1	(Sweden) (Croatia)	Caijsa Hennemann; Petra Marčinko	6; 4	7; 5
2	(Sweden) (Croatia)	Rebecca Peterson; Tara Würth	7^{7} 6^{3}	7^{7} 6^{5}
3	(Sweden) (Croatia)	Jacqueline Cabaj Awad / Kajsa Rinaldo Persson; Lucija Ćirić Bagarić / Antonia Ružić	7; 5	7; 5

==== Bulgaria vs. Norway ====
Bulgaria
1
Megasaray Tennis Academy, Antalya, Turkey
13 April 2023
Clay

Norway
2

			1	2	3
1	(Bulgaria) (Norway)	Lia Karatancheva; Ulrikke Eikeri	3; 6	6; 4	6; 4
2	(Bulgaria) (Norway)	Gergana Topalova; Malene Helgø	0; 6	2; 6
3	(Bulgaria) (Norway)	Lia Karatancheva / Gergana Topalova; Ulrikke Eikeri / Malene Helgø	6; 2	1; 6	4; 6

==== Serbia vs. Sweden ====
Serbia
1
Megasaray Tennis Academy, Antalya, Turkey
14 April 2023
Clay

Sweden
2

			1	2	3
1	(Serbia) (Sweden)	Mia Ristić; Caijsa Hennemann	6; 4	5; 7	1; 6
2	(Serbia) (Sweden)	Lola Radivojević; Rebecca Peterson	4; 6	6; 3	4; 6
3	(Serbia) (Sweden)	Olga Danilović / Katarina Kozarov; Jacqueline Cabaj Awad / Kajsa Rinaldo Persson	6; 4	6; 3

==== Croatia vs. Norway ====
Croatia
3
Megasaray Tennis Academy, Antalya, Turkey
14 April 2023
Clay

Norway
0

			1	2	3
1	(Croatia) (Norway)	Antonia Ružić; Ulrikke Eikeri	6; 2	6; 4
2	(Croatia) (Norway)	Tara Würth; Malene Helgø	0; 6	6; 3	6; 3
3	(Croatia) (Norway)	Lucija Ćirić Bagarić / Petra Marčinko; Emilie Elde / Lilly Elida Håseth	6; 2	6; 1

==== Bulgaria vs. Denmark ====
Bulgaria
2
Megasaray Tennis Academy, Antalya, Turkey
14 April 2023
Clay

Denmark
1

			1	2	3
1	(Bulgaria) (Denmark)	Lia Karatancheva; Rebecca Munk Mortensen	6; 0	6; 0
2	(Bulgaria) (Denmark)	Gergana Topalova; Clara Tauson	3; 6	1; 6
3	(Bulgaria) (Denmark)	Lia Karatancheva / Gergana Topalova; Rebecca Munk Mortensen / Johanne Svendsen	6; 3	3; 6	6; 1

- Sources

=== Play-offs ===
Placing	A Team	Score	B Team
1st (Note: Both teams are promoted but played-off for 1st place ranking points)	Hungary	1–2	Sweden
Promotional	Netherlands	2–1	Serbia
5th–6th	Turkey	0–2	Bulgaria
7th–8th	Latvia	2–0	Norway
Relegation	Egypt	1–2	Denmark
Relegation	—N/a		Croatia

=== Final placements ===
Placing	Teams
Promoted/First	Sweden
Promoted/Second	Hungary
Promoted/Third	Netherlands
Promoted/Fourth	Serbia
Fifth	Bulgaria
Sixth	Turkey
Seventh	Latvia
Eighth	Norway
Ninth	Denmark
Relegated/Tenth	Egypt
Relegated/Eleventh	Croatia

- Sweden, Hungary, Netherlands, and Serbia were promoted to the 2023 Billie Jean King Cup play-offs.
  - Serbia was added based on ranking (25th) when Poland was chosen as wild card of the 2023 Billie Jean King Cup Finals.
- Egypt and Croatia were relegated to Europe/Africa Zone Group II in 2024.

== Group II ==
- Venue: Jamor Sports Complex, Oeiras, Portugal (clay, outdoors)
- Date: 10–15 April 2023

The eleven teams were divided into two pools of five and six teams. The top two teams in both pools played for two promotional places. Two teams were relegated.

=== Seeding ===
Nation	Rank^{1}	Seed
Greece	43	1
Lithuania	54	2
Israel	57	3
Estonia	59	4
Georgia	62	5
Bosnia and Herzegovina	68	6
Portugal	69	7
Ireland	70	8
Malta	73	9
South Africa	74	10
Kosovo	76	11

- ^{1}Billie Jean King Cup Rankings as of 16 November 2022

=== Pools ===
	Pool A	POR	GRE	BIH	ISR	MLT
1	Portugal (4–0)		2–1	2–1	3–0	2–1
2	Greece (3–1)	1–2		2–1	3–0	2–1
3	Bosnia and Herzegovina (2–2)	1–2	1–2		3–0	2–1
4	Israel (1–3)	0–3	0–3	0–3		2–1
5	Malta (0–4)	1–2	1–2	1–2	1–2	

	Pool B	EST	GEO	LTU	KOS	RSA	IRE
1	Estonia (5–0)		3–0	2–1	3–0	3–0	3–0
2	Georgia (4–1)	0–3		2–1	3–0	3–0	2–1
3	Lithuania (3–2)	1–2	1–2		3–0	2–1	3–0
4	Kosovo (2–3)	0–3	0–3	0–3		3–0	2–1
5	South Africa (1–4)	0–3	0–3	1–2	0–3		2–1
6	Ireland (0–5)	0–3	1–2	0–3	1–2	1–2	

=== Play-offs ===
Placing	A Team	Score	B Team
Promotional	Portugal	2–0	Georgia
Promotional	Greece	2–0	Estonia
5th–8th	Bosnia and Herzegovina	2–0	Kosovo
5th–8th	Israel	0–2	Lithuania
Relegation	Malta	2–0	South Africa
Relegation	—N/a		Ireland

=== Final placements ===
Placing	Teams	
Promoted/First	Portugal	Greece
Third	Georgia	Estonia
Fifth	Bosnia and Herzegovina	Lithuania
Seventh	Israel	Kosovo
Ninth	Malta	
Relegated/Tenth	South Africa	
Relegated/Eleventh	Ireland	

- Portugal and Greece were promoted to Europe/Africa Zone Group I in 2024.
- South Africa and Ireland were respectively relegated to Africa Zone Group III and Europe Zone Group III in 2024.

== Group III Europe ==
- Venue: Tennis Club Jug, Skopje, North Macedonia (clay, outdoors)
- Date: 19-24 June 2023

The eleven teams were divided into two pools of five and six teams. The top teams in both pools will play for one promotional place.

=== Seeding ===
Nation	Rank	Seed
Luxembourg	66	1
Finland	75	2
Cyprus	82	3
North Macedonia	83	4
Montenegro	84	5
Moldova	91	6
Armenia	95	7
Albania	98	8
Iceland	101	9
Azerbaijan	106	10
San Marino	NR	–

=== Pools ===
	Pool A	ARM	CYP	LUX	MNE	SMR
1	Armenia (4–0)		2–1	2–1	2–1	2–1
2	Cyprus (3–1)	1–2		2–1	2–1	3–0
3	Luxembourg (2–2)	1–2	1–2		3–0	3–0
4	Montenegro (1–3)	1–2	1–2	0–3		3–0
5	San Marino (0–4)	1–2	0–3	0–3	0–3	

	Pool B	MKD	FIN	MDA	ALB	ISL	AZE
1	North Macedonia (5–0)		2–1	3–0	3–0	3–0	3–0
2	Finland (4–1)	1–2		3–0	3–0	3–0	3–0
3	Moldova (3–2)	0–3	0–3		3–0	3–0	3–0
4	Albania (2–3)	0–3	0–3	0–3		3–0	3–0
5	Iceland (1–4)	0–3	0–3	0–3	0–3		3–0
6	Azerbaijan (0–5)	0–3	0–3	0–3	0–3	0–3	

=== Play-offs ===
Placing	A Team	Score	B Team
Promotional	Armenia	1–2	North Macedonia
3rd–4th	Cyprus	0–3	Finland
5th–6th	Luxembourg	2–1	Moldova
7th–8th	Montenegro	0–2	Albania
9th–10th	San Marino	1–2	Iceland
11th	—N/a		Azerbaijan

=== Final placements ===
Placing	Teams
Promoted/First	North Macedonia
Second	Armenia
Third	Finland
Fourth	Cyprus
Fifth	Luxembourg
Sixth	Moldova
Seventh	Albania
Eighth	Montenegro
Ninth	Iceland
Tenth	San Marino
Eleventh	Azerbaijan

- North Macedonia was promoted to Europe/Africa Zone Group II in 2024.

== Group III Africa ==
- Venue: Nairobi Club, Nairobi, Kenya (clay)
- Date: 12-17 June 2023

The twelve teams were divided into two pools of six teams. The top teams in both pools will play for one promotional place. One team will be relegated.

=== Seeding ===
Nation	Rank	Seed
Morocco	90	1
Tunisia	93	2
Botswana	100	3
Ghana	106	4
Burundi	109	5
Nigeria	110	6
Zimbabwe	112	7
Namibia	113	8
Mauritius	114=	9
Uganda	114=	10
Kenya	116	11
Seychelles	117	12

=== Pools ===
	Pool A	MAR	KEN	NGR	BOT	NAM	UGA
1	Morocco (4–1)		1–2	3–0	3–0	3–0	3–0
2	Kenya (4–1)	2–1		1–2	3–0	3–0	3–0
3	Nigeria (4–1)	0–3	2–1		3–0	3–0	3–0
4	Botswana (2–3)	0–3	0–3	0–3		2–1	3–0
5	Namibia (1–4)	0–3	0–3	0–3	1–2		3–0
6	Uganda (0–5)	0–3	0–3	0–3	0–3	0–3	

	Pool B	TUN	ZIM	GHA	MRI	BDI	SEY
1	Tunisia (5–0)		3–0	3–0	3–0	3–0	3–0
2	Zimbabwe (4–1)	0–3		3–0	3–0	2–1	3–0
3	Ghana (3–2)	0–3	0–3		2–1	3–0	3–0
4	Mauritius (2–3)	0–3	0–3	1–2		3–0	3–0
5	Burundi (1–4)	0–3	1–2	0–3	0–3		3–0
6	Seychelles (0–5)	0–3	0–3	0–3	0–3	0–3	

=== Play-offs ===
Placing	A Team	Score	B Team
Promotional	Morocco	2–1	Tunisia
3rd–4th	Kenya	2–1	Zimbabwe
5th–6th	Nigeria	2–0	Ghana
7th–8th	Botswana	0–2	Mauritius
9th–10th	Namibia	1–2	Burundi
Relegation	Uganda	2–0	Seychelles

=== Final placements ===
Placing	Teams
Promoted/First	Morocco
Second	Tunisia
Third	Kenya
Fourth	Zimbabwe
Fifth	Nigeria
Sixth	Ghana
Seventh	Mauritius
Eighth	Botswana
Ninth	Burundi
Tenth	Namibia
Eleventh	Uganda
Relegated/Twelfth	Seychelles

- Morocco was promoted to Europe/Africa Zone Group II in 2024.
- Seychelles was relegated to Africa Zone Group IV in 2024.

== Group IV Africa ==
- Venue: Ecology Tennis Club, Kigali, Rwanda (clay)
- Date: 5–10 June 2023

The eleven teams were divided into two pools of five and six teams. The top teams in both pools played for one promotional place.

=== Seeding ===
Nation	Rank	Seed
Congo	119=	1
Rwanda	119=	2
Angola	NR	–
Cameroon	NR	–
DR Congo	NR	–
Ethiopia	NR	–
Lesotho	NR	–
Madagascar	NR	–
Mozambique	NR	–
Senegal	NR	–
Tanzania	NR	–

=== Pools ===
	Pool A	TAN	RWA	ETH	ANG	MOZ
1	Tanzania (4–0)		2–1	2–1	2–1	3–0
2	Rwanda (3–1)	1–2		3–0	3–0	3–0
3	Ethiopia (2–2)	1–2	0–3		3–0	3–0
4	Angola (1–3)	1–2	0–3	0–3		2–1
5	Mozambique (0–4)	0–3	0–3	0–3	1–2	

	Pool B	MAD	CMR	DRC	SEN	LES	CGO
1	Madagascar (5–0)		2–1	3–0	3–0	3–0	3–0
2	Cameroon (4–1)	1–2		3–0	3–0	3–0	3–0
3	DR Congo (3–2)	0–3	0–3		2–1	3–0	3–0
4	Senegal (2–3)	0–3	0–3	1–2		3–0	3–0
5	Lesotho (1–4)	0–3	0–3	0–3	0–3		3–0
6	Congo (0–5)	0–3	0–3	0–3	0–3	0–3	

=== Play-offs ===
Placing	A Team	Score	B Team
Promotional	Tanzania	0–3	Madagascar
3rd–4th	Rwanda	0–3	Cameroon
5th–6th	Ethiopia	2–1	DR Congo
7th–8th	Angola	0–2	Senegal
9th–10th	Mozambique	0–2	Lesotho
11th	—N/a		Congo

=== Final placements ===
Placing	Teams
Promoted/First	Madagascar
Second	Tanzania
Third	Cameroon
Fourth	Rwanda
Fifth	Ethiopia
Sixth	DR Congo
Seventh	Senegal
Eighth	Angola
Ninth	Lesotho
Tenth	Mozambique
Eleventh	Congo

- Madagascar was promoted to Africa Zone Group III in 2024.
