= 2024 Billie Jean King Cup Europe/Africa Zone =

Subsection of tennis competition

The 32nd Europe/Africa Zone is one of three zones of regional competition in the 2024 Billie Jean King Cup.

== Group I ==
- Venue: Complexo de tenis do Jamor, Oeiras, Portugal (Clay)
- Date: 8-13 April 2024

The twelve teams were divided into three pools of four teams. The winners of each pool are promoted to the 2024 Billie Jean King Cup Play-offs and will compete in a round-robin to determine final positions. Second-placed teams played for the fourth promotion spot. Third-placed teams played for overall position. Fourth-placed teams played for 10th place and last two teams were relegated.

=== Pool A ===
| Pos | Team | Pld | W | L | Match RR W–L |
|---|---|---|---|---|---|
| 1 | Austria | 3 | 2 | 1 | 5–4 |
| 2 | Denmark | 3 | 2 | 1 | 5–4 |
| 3 | Hungary | 3 | 1 | 2 | 4–5 |
| 4 | Bulgaria | 3 | 1 | 2 | 4–5 |

=== Pool B ===
| Pos | Team | Pld | W | L | Match RR W–L |
|---|---|---|---|---|---|
| 1 | Netherlands | 3 | 3 | 0 | 7–2 |
| 2 | Latvia | 3 | 2 | 1 | 6–3 |
| 3 | Turkey | 3 | 1 | 2 | 4–5 |
| 4 | Portugal | 3 | 0 | 3 | 1–8 |

=== Pool C ===
| Pos | Team | Pld | W | L | Match RR W–L |
|---|---|---|---|---|---|
| 1 | Serbia | 3 | 3 | 0 | 8–1 |
| 2 | Greece | 3 | 2 | 1 | 6–3 |
| 3 | Sweden | 3 | 1 | 2 | 3–6 |
| 4 | Norway | 3 | 0 | 3 | 1–8 |

=== 1st to 3rd Play-Off ===
==== Netherlands vs. Serbia ====
Netherlands
2
Complexo de tenis do Jamor, Oeiras, Portugal
11 April 2024
Clay

Serbia
1

| | | | 1 | 2 | 3 |
|---|---|---|---|---|---|
| 1 | (Netherlands) (Serbia) | Eva Vedder; Lola Radivojević | 3; 6 | 2; 6 |
| 2 | (Netherlands) (Serbia) | Suzan Lamens; Mia Ristić | 6; 2 | 6; 4 |
| 3 | (Netherlands) (Serbia) | Suzan Lamens / Demi Schuurs; Lola Radivojević / Nina Stojanović | 6; 1 | 6; 4 |

==== Austria vs. Serbia ====
Austria
3
Complexo de tenis do Jamor, Oeiras, Portugal
12 April 2024
Clay

Serbia
0

| | | | 1 | 2 | 3 |
|---|---|---|---|---|---|
| 1 | (Austria) (Serbia) | Tamira Paszek; Elena Milovanović | 6; 4 | 6; 3 |
| 2 | (Austria) (Serbia) | Sinja Kraus; Mia Ristić | 6; 2 | 6; 4 |
| 3 | (Austria) (Serbia) | Melanie Klaffner / Tamara Kostic; Elena Milovanović / Mia Ristić | 6; 3 | 4; 6 | 10; 8 |

==== Austria vs. Netherlands ====
Austria
1
Complexo de tenis do Jamor, Oeiras, Portugal
13 April 2024
Clay

Netherlands
2

| | | | 1 | 2 | 3 |
|---|---|---|---|---|---|
| 1 | (Austria) (Netherlands) | Tamira Paszek; Anouk Koevermans | 6; 2 | 6; 3 |
| 2 | (Austria) (Netherlands) | Sinja Kraus; Suzan Lamens | 3; 6 | 1; 6 |
| 3 | (Austria) (Netherlands) | Sinja Kraus / Tamira Paszek; Suzan Lamens / Demi Schuurs | 5; 7 | 3; 6 |

=== 4th to 6th Play-Off ===
==== Latvia vs. Greece ====
Latvia
0
Complexo de tenis do Jamor, Oeiras, Portugal
11 April 2024
Clay

Greece
3

| | | | 1 | 2 | 3 |
|---|---|---|---|---|---|
| 1 | (Latvia) (Greece) | Daniela Vismane; Valentini Grammatikopoulou | 0; 6 | 5; 7 |
| 2 | (Latvia) (Greece) | Darja Semeņistaja; Maria Sakkari | 0; 6 | 5; 7 |
| 3 | (Latvia) (Greece) | Adelina Lachinova / Jeļena Ostapenko; Martha Matoula / Despina Papamichail | 4; 6 | 6; 3 | 8; 10 |

==== Denmark vs. Greece ====
Denmark
2
Complexo de tenis do Jamor, Oeiras, Portugal
12 April 2024
Clay

Greece
1

| | | | 1 | 2 | 3 |
|---|---|---|---|---|---|
| 1 | (Denmark) (Greece) | Johanne Svendsen; Valentini Grammatikopoulou | 7^{7} 6^{4} | 4; 6 | 6; 3 |
| 2 | (Denmark) (Greece) | Clara Tauson; Maria Sakkari | 6; 4 | 6; 4 |
| 3 | (Denmark) (Greece) | Laura Brunkel / Rebecca Munk Mortensen; Despina Papamichail / Maria Sakkari | 1; 6 | 1; 6 |

==== Denmark vs. Latvia ====
Denmark
2
Complexo de tenis do Jamor, Oeiras, Portugal
13 April 2024
Clay

Latvia
0

| | | | 1 | 2 | 3 |
|---|---|---|---|---|---|---|
| 1 | (Denmark) (Latvia) | Johanne Svendsen; Adelina Lachinova | 6; 3 | 7; 5 |
| 2 | (Denmark) (Latvia) | Clara Tauson; Darja Semeņistaja | 6; 1 | | | retired |
| 3 | (Denmark) (Latvia) | Laura Brunkel / Rebecca Munk Mortensen; Adelina Lachinova / Daniela Vismane | | | | not played |

=== 7th to 9th Play-Off ===
==== Turkey vs. Sweden ====
Turkey
2
Complexo de tenis do Jamor, Oeiras, Portugal
11 April 2024
Clay

Sweden
1

| | | | 1 | 2 | 3 |
|---|---|---|---|---|---|
| 1 | (Turkey) (Sweden) | Çağla Büyükakçay; Lea Nilsson | 4; 6 | 6; 2 | 3; 6 |
| 2 | (Turkey) (Sweden) | Ayla Aksu; Jacqueline Cabaj Awad | 6; 4 | 3; 6 | 7; 5 |
| 3 | (Turkey) (Sweden) | Berfu Cengiz / Zeynep Sönmez; Jacqueline Cabaj Awad / Lea Nilsson | 6; 3 | 6; 1 |

==== Hungary vs. Sweden ====
Hungary
3
Complexo de tenis do Jamor, Oeiras, Portugal
12 April 2024
Clay

Sweden
0

| | | | 1 | 2 | 3 |
|---|---|---|---|---|---|
| 1 | (Hungary) (Sweden) | Adrienn Nagy; Lea Nilsson | 6; 3 | 6; 2 |
| 2 | (Hungary) (Sweden) | Natália Szabanin; Jacqueline Cabaj Awad | 6; 2 | 6; 4 |
| 3 | (Hungary) (Sweden) | Fanny Stollár / Natália Szabanin; Jacqueline Cabaj Awad / Caijsa Hennemann | 6; 4 | 6; 4 |

==== Hungary vs. Turkey ====
Hungary
0
Complexo de tenis do Jamor, Oeiras, Portugal
13 April 2024
Clay

Turkey
3

| | | | 1 | 2 | 3 |
|---|---|---|---|---|---|---|
| 1 | (Hungary) (Turkey) | Adrienn Nagy; Çağla Büyükakçay | 4; 6 | 5; 7 |
| 2 | (Hungary) (Turkey) | Fanny Stollár; Ayla Aksu | | | | w/o |
| 3 | (Hungary) (Turkey) | Adrienn Nagy / Fanny Stollár; Berfu Cengiz / İpek Öz | | | | w/o |

=== 10th to 12th Play-Off ===
==== Portugal vs. Norway ====
Portugal
2
Complexo de tenis do Jamor, Oeiras, Portugal
11 April 2024
Clay

Norway
1

| | | | 1 | 2 | 3 |
|---|---|---|---|---|---|
| 1 | (Portugal) (Norway) | Angelina Voloshchuk; Emily Sartz-Lunde | 6; 3 | 6^{6} 7^{8} | 4; 6 |
| 2 | (Portugal) (Norway) | Francisca Jorge; Ulrikke Eikeri | 6; 2 | 6; 1 |
| 3 | (Portugal) (Norway) | Francisca Jorge / Matilde Jorge; Ulrikke Eikeri / Emily Sartz-Lunde | 7^{7} 6^{2} | 7^{7} 6^{4} |

==== Bulgaria vs. Norway ====
Bulgaria
2
Complexo de tenis do Jamor, Oeiras, Portugal
12 April 2024
Clay

Norway
1

| | | | 1 | 2 | 3 |
|---|---|---|---|---|---|
| 1 | (Bulgaria) (Norway) | Gergana Topalova; Emily Sartz-Lunde | 3; 6 | 6; 3 | 6; 2 |
| 2 | (Bulgaria) (Norway) | Viktoriya Tomova; Ulrikke Eikeri | 6; 2 | 6^{4} 7^{7} | 3; 6 |
| 3 | (Bulgaria) (Norway) | Lia Karatantcheva / Gergana Topalova; Emily Sartz-Lunde / Carina Syrtveit | 7^{7} 6^{4} | 7; 5 |

==== Bulgaria vs. Portugal ====
Bulgaria
1
Complexo de tenis do Jamor, Oeiras, Portugal
13 April 2024
Clay

Portugal
2

| | | | 1 | 2 | 3 |
|---|---|---|---|---|---|
| 1 | (Bulgaria) (Portugal) | Lia Karatantcheva; Angelina Voloshchuk | 6; 1 | 6; 3 |
| 2 | (Bulgaria) (Portugal) | Gergana Topalova; Francisca Jorge | 4; 6 | 4; 6 |
| 3 | (Bulgaria) (Portugal) | Lia Karatantcheva / Isabella Shinikova; Francisca Jorge / Matilde Jorge | 3; 6 | 6; 4 | 2; 10 |

=== Final placements ===
| Placing | Teams |
| Promoted/First | Netherlands |
| Promoted/Second | Austria |
| Promoted/Third | Serbia |
| Promoted/Fourth | Denmark |
| Fifth | Greece |
| Sixth | Latvia |
| Seventh | Turkey |
| Eighth | Hungary |
| Ninth | Sweden |
| Tenth | Portugal |
| Relegated/Eleventh | Bulgaria |
| Relegated/Twelfth | Norway |

- Netherlands, Austria, Serbia, and Denmark were promoted to the 2024 Billie Jean King Cup play-offs.
- Bulgaria and Norway were relegated to Europe/Africa Zone Group II in 2025.

== Group II ==
- Venue: SEB Arena, Vilnius, Lithuania (Hard)
- Date: 8-13 April 2024

The eleven teams were divided into one pool of three teams (Pool A) and two pools of four teams (Pools B and C). The winners of each pool will compete in a round-robin, with the top two teams winning promotion to Europe/Africa Group I in 2025. The teams finishing bottom in Pools B and C will be relegated to their respective Group III event (either Europe III or Africa III) in 2025.

=== Pool A ===
| Pos | Team | Pld | W | L | Match RR W–L |
|---|---|---|---|---|---|
| 1 | Croatia | 2 | 2 | 0 | 6–0 |
| 2 | North Macedonia | 2 | 1 | 1 | 2–4 |
| 3 | Estonia | 2 | 0 | 2 | 1–5 |

=== Pool B ===
| Pos | Team | Pld | W | L | Match RR W–L |
|---|---|---|---|---|---|
| 1 | Lithuania | 3 | 3 | 0 | 6–3 |
| 2 | Israel | 3 | 1 | 2 | 5–4 |
| 3 | Bosnia and Herzegovina | 3 | 1 | 2 | 4–5 |
| 4 | Morocco | 3 | 1 | 2 | 3–6 |

=== Pool C ===
| Pos | Team | Pld | W | L | Match RR W–L |
|---|---|---|---|---|---|
| 1 | Egypt | 3 | 2 | 1 | 7–2 |
| 2 | Georgia | 3 | 2 | 1 | 6–3 |
| 3 | Kosovo | 3 | 2 | 1 | 5–4 |
| 4 | Malta | 3 | 0 | 3 | 0–9 |

=== 1st to 3rd Play-Off ===
==== Lithuania vs. Egypt ====
Lithuania
2
SEB Arena, Vilnius, Lithuania
11 April 2024
Hard

Egypt
1

| | | | 1 | 2 | 3 |
|---|---|---|---|---|---|
| 1 | (Lithuania) (Egypt) | Klaudija Bubelytė; Lamis Alhussein Abdel Aziz | 6; 1 | 6; 4 |
| 2 | (Lithuania) (Egypt) | Justina Mikulskytė; Mayar Sherif | 2; 6 | 1; 6 |
| 3 | (Lithuania) (Egypt) | Justina Mikulskytė / Patricija Paukštytė; Yasmin Ezzat / Mayar Sherif | 6; 2 | 7; 5 |

==== Croatia vs. Egypt ====
Croatia
3
SEB Arena, Vilnius, Lithuania
12 April 2024
Hard

Egypt
0

| | | | 1 | 2 | 3 |
|---|---|---|---|---|---|
| 1 | (Croatia) (Egypt) | Lea Bošković; Sandra Samir | 6; 1 | 6; 4 |
| 2 | (Croatia) (Egypt) | Antonia Ružić; Mayar Sherif | 6; 1 | 6; 1 |
| 3 | (Croatia) (Egypt) | Iva Primorac / Antonia Ružić; Yasmin Ezzat / Merna Refaat | 6; 1 | 6; 2 |

==== Croatia vs. Lithuania ====
Croatia
2
SEB Arena, Vilnius, Lithuania
13 April 2024
Hard

Lithuania
0

| | | | 1 | 2 | 3 |
|---|---|---|---|---|---|---|
| 1 | (Croatia) (Lithuania) | Iva Primorac; Patricija Paukštytė | 6; 1 | 6; 1 |
| 2 | (Croatia) (Lithuania) | Lea Bošković; Justina Mikulskytė | 3; 6 | 6; 2 | 7; 5 |
| 3 | (Croatia) (Lithuania) | Lea Bošković / Iva Primorac; Andrė Lukošiūtė / Patricija Paukštytė | | | | not played |

=== 4th to 6th Play-Off ===
==== Israel vs. Georgia ====
Israel
2
SEB Arena, Vilnius, Lithuania
11 April 2024
Hard

Georgia
1

| | | | 1 | 2 | 3 |
|---|---|---|---|---|---|
| 1 | (Israel) (Georgia (country)) | Mika Buchnik; Zoziya Kardava | 6; 4 | 6; 2 |
| 2 | (Israel) (Georgia (country)) | Alian Zack; Ekaterine Gorgodze | 2; 6 | 2; 6 |
| 3 | (Israel) (Georgia (country)) | Karin Altori / Mika Buchnik; Zoziya Kardava / Natela Dzalamidze | 6; 3 | 7; 5 |

==== North Macedonia vs. Georgia ====
North Macedonia
2
SEB Arena, Vilnius, Lithuania
12 April 2024
Hard

Georgia
1

| | | | 1 | 2 | 3 |
|---|---|---|---|---|---|---|
| 1 | (North Macedonia) (Georgia (country)) | Magdalena Stoilkovska; Zoziya Kardava | 6; 1 | 2; 6 | 6; 3 |
| 2 | (North Macedonia) (Georgia (country)) | Lina Gjorcheska; Ekaterine Gorgodze | 6; 1 | | | retired |
| 3 | (North Macedonia) (Georgia (country)) | Teona Andova / Iva Daneva; Natela Dzalamidze / Oksana Kalashnikova | 0; 6 | 1; 6 |

==== North Macedonia vs. Israel ====
North Macedonia
2
SEB Arena, Vilnius, Lithuania
13 April 2024
Hard

Israel
1

| | | | 1 | 2 | 3 |
|---|---|---|---|---|---|
| 1 | (North Macedonia) (Israel) | Magdalena Stoilkovska; Mika Buchnik | 6; 2 | 6; 4 |
| 2 | (North Macedonia) (Israel) | Lina Gjorcheska; Karin Altori | 6; 0 | 6; 0 |
| 3 | (North Macedonia) (Israel) | Teona Andova / Ana Mitevska; Karin Altori / Alian Zack | 0; 6 | 2; 6 |

=== 7th to 9th Play-Off ===
==== Bosnia and Herzegovina vs. Kosovo ====
Bosnia and Herzegovina
2
SEB Arena, Vilnius, Lithuania
11 April 2024
Hard

Kosovo
1

| | | | 1 | 2 | 3 |
|---|---|---|---|---|---|
| 1 | (Bosnia and Herzegovina) (Kosovo) | Laura Radaković; Aja Broqı | 6; 1 | 6; 1 |
| 2 | (Bosnia and Herzegovina) (Kosovo) | Suana Tucaković; Arlinda Rushiti | 2; 6 | 2; 6 |
| 3 | (Bosnia and Herzegovina) (Kosovo) | Dea Herdželaš / Anita Wagner; Adrijana Lekaj / Arlinda Rushiti | 6; 0 | 1; 6 | 10; 5 |

==== Estonia vs. Kosovo ====
Estonia
3
SEB Arena, Vilnius, Lithuania
12 April 2024
Hard

Kosovo
0

| | | | 1 | 2 | 3 |
|---|---|---|---|---|---|
| 1 | (Estonia) (Kosovo) | Elena Malõgina; Forta Morina | 6; 1 | 6; 1 |
| 2 | (Estonia) (Kosovo) | Kaia Kanepi; Arlinda Rushiti | 6; 2 | 3; 6 | 6; 3 |
| 3 | (Estonia) (Kosovo) | Ingrid Neel / Laura Rahnel; Aja Broqı / Adrijana Lekaj | 6; 1 | 6; 0 |

==== Estonia vs. Bosnia and Herzegovina ====
Estonia
2
SEB Arena, Vilnius, Lithuania
13 April 2024
Hard

Bosnia and Herzegovina
1

| | | | 1 | 2 | 3 |
|---|---|---|---|---|---|---|
| 1 | (Estonia) (Bosnia and Herzegovina) | Laura Rahnel; Suana Tucaković | 4; 6 | 4; 6 |
| 2 | (Estonia) (Bosnia and Herzegovina) | Elena Malõgina; Dea Herdželaš | 4; 1 | | | retired |
| 3 | (Estonia) (Bosnia and Herzegovina) | Elena Malõgina / Ingrid Neel; Laura Radaković / Anita Wagner | 6; 2 | 6; 3 |

=== 10th to 11th Play-Off ===
==== Morocco vs. Malta ====
Morocco
3
SEB Arena, Vilnius, Lithuania
11 April 2024
Hard

Malta
0

| | | | 1 | 2 | 3 |
|---|---|---|---|---|---|
| 1 | (Morocco) (Malta) | Malak El Allam; Betha-Anne Mayo | 6; 1 | 6; 0 |
| 2 | (Morocco) (Malta) | Aya El Aouni; Emma Montebello | 6; 4 | 7; 5 |
| 3 | (Morocco) (Malta) | Oumaima Aziz / Aya El Aouni; Betha-Anne Mayo / Emma Montebello | 6; 0 | 6; 3 |

=== Final placements ===
| Placing | Teams |
| Promoted/First | Croatia |
| Promoted/Second | Lithuania |
| Third | Egypt |
| Fourth | North Macedonia |
| Fifth | Israel |
| Sixth | Georgia |
| Seventh | Estonia |
| Eighth | Bosnia and Herzegovina |
| Ninth | Kosovo |
| Relegated/Tenth | Morocco |
| Relegated/Eleventh | Malta |

- Croatia and Lithuania were promoted to the Europe/Africa Zone Group I in 2025.
- Morocco and Malta were respectively relegated to Africa Zone Group III and Europe Zone Group III in 2025.

== Group III Europe ==
- Venue: Chișinău Arena Tennis Club, Chișinău, Moldova (Hard)
- Date: 17–22 June 2024

The eleven teams were divided into three pools. One pool of three teams and two pools of four teams. The winners of each pool will compete in a round-robin, with the top team winning promotion to Europe/Africa Group II in 2025.

=== Pool A ===
| Pos | Team | Pld | W | L | Match RR W–L |
|---|---|---|---|---|---|
| 1 | Finland | 2 | 2 | 0 | 5–1 |
| 2 | Moldova | 2 | 1 | 1 | 4–2 |
| 3 | Iceland | 2 | 0 | 2 | 0–6 |

=== Pool B ===
| Pos | Team | Pld | W | L | Match RR W–L |
|---|---|---|---|---|---|
| 1 | Cyprus | 3 | 3 | 0 | 9–0 |
| 2 | Armenia | 3 | 2 | 1 | 6–3 |
| 3 | San Marino | 3 | 1 | 2 | 2–7 |
| 4 | Albania | 3 | 0 | 3 | 1–8 |

=== Pool C ===
| Pos | Team | Pld | W | L | Match RR W–L |
|---|---|---|---|---|---|
| 1 | Ireland | 3 | 3 | 0 | 8–1 |
| 2 | Luxembourg | 3 | 2 | 1 | 6–3 |
| 3 | Montenegro | 3 | 1 | 2 | 4–5 |
| 4 | Azerbaijan | 3 | 0 | 3 | 0–9 |

=== Final placements ===
| Placing | Teams |
| Promoted/First | Cyprus |
| Second | Finland |
| Third | Ireland |
| Fourth | Moldova |
| Fifth | Armenia |
| Sixth | Luxembourg |
| Seventh | Montenegro |
| Eighth | San Marino |
| Ninth | Iceland |
| Tenth | Albania |
| Eleventh | Azerbaijan |

- Cyprus was promoted to the Europe/Africa Zone Group II in 2025.

== Group III Africa ==
- Venue: Nairobi Club, Nairobi, Kenya (clay)
- Date: 10-15 June 2024

The twelve teams were divided into pools of four teams. The winners of each pool will compete in a round-robin, with the top team winning promotion to Europe/Africa Group II in 2025. Teams finishing in fourth place in the first round-robin will compete to not be relegated.

=== Pool A ===
| Pos | Team | Pld | W | L | Match RR W–L |
|---|---|---|---|---|---|
| 1 | South Africa | 3 | 3 | 0 | 8–1 |
| 2 | Zimbabwe | 3 | 2 | 1 | 6–3 |
| 3 | Madagascar | 3 | 1 | 2 | 4–5 |
| 4 | Namibia | 3 | 0 | 3 | 0–9 |

=== Pool B ===
| Pos | Team | Pld | W | L | Match RR W–L |
|---|---|---|---|---|---|
| 1 | Kenya | 3 | 3 | 0 | 7–2 |
| 2 | Burundi | 3 | 2 | 1 | 6–3 |
| 3 | Tunisia | 3 | 1 | 2 | 5–4 |
| 4 | Mauritius | 3 | 0 | 3 | 0–9 |

=== Pool C ===
| Pos | Team | Pld | W | L | Match RR W–L |
|---|---|---|---|---|---|
| 1 | Nigeria | 3 | 3 | 0 | 8–1 |
| 2 | Botswana | 3 | 2 | 1 | 6–3 |
| 3 | Ghana | 3 | 1 | 2 | 4–5 |
| 4 | Uganda | 3 | 0 | 3 | 0–9 |

=== Final placements ===
| Placing | Teams |
| Promoted/First | South Africa |
| Second | Nigeria |
| Third | Kenya |
| Fourth | Zimbabwe |
| Fifth | Botswana |
| Sixth | Burundi |
| Seventh | Madagascar |
| Eighth | Tunisia |
| Ninth | Ghana |
| Tenth | Namibia |
| Eleventh | Uganda |
| Relegated/Twelfth | Mauritius |

- South Africa was promoted to the Europe/Africa Zone Group II in 2025.
- Mauritius was relegated to the Africa Zone Group IV in 2025.
