= 2022 Billie Jean King Cup =

International women's tennis competition

Details
- Edition: 59th

Achievements (singles)

Switzerland defeated Australia 2–0 in the tennis final of the 2022 Billie Jean King Cup. It was the 59th edition of the women's international team competition.

Aruba, Burundi, Laos, Maldives, Seychelles, and U.S. Virgin Islands made their first appearances in the tournament.

== Billie Jean King Cup finals ==
Semifinals
1	Switzerland	2
4	Czech Republic	0
3	Great Britain	1
2	Australia	2

Finals
Switzerland	2
Australia	0

Date: 8–13 November 2022
Venue: Emirates Arena, Glasgow, United Kingdom
Surface: Hard (i)

12 nations took part in the Finals, formerly known as the World Group. The qualification was as follows:

- 1 finalist of the previous edition (Switzerland, defending champion Russia was suspended)
- 1 host nation (Great Britain)
- 7 winners of a qualifier round, in April 2022
- 1 team received a bye in the qualifying round (Slovakia) and 1 team qualified with a walkover (Belgium)

Participating teams
Australia	Belgium	Canada	Czech Republic	Great Britain (H)	Italy
Kazakhstan	Poland	Slovakia	Spain	Switzerland (TH)	United States

=== Qualifying round ===
Date: 15–16 April 2022

Eighteen teams were scheduled to play for nine spots for the Finals, in a series decided on a home and away basis.

These eighteen teams originally were:

- 10 teams ranked 3rd-12th in the 2020–21 Billie Jean King Cup Finals,
- 7 winners of the 2020–21 Billie Jean King Cup play-offs,
- 1 loser of the 2020–21 Billie Jean King Cup play-offs, based on rankings

The 9 losing teams from the qualifying round play the play-offs, against the 9 nations that are promoted from the Regional Group I from Americas, Europe/Africa and Asia/Oceania, to see who will contend the 2023 Qualifiers and who stays in the Regional Group I in 2023.

However, prior to the qualifying round both Russia and Belarus were suspended from taking part in international events by the ITF. Australia, the runner-up from 2020, was given the defending champion's right to advance. They were scheduled to play Slovakia. Both teams were given byes. Belgium, scheduled to play Belarus, was also given a bye.

#: Nations Ranking as of 8 November 2021.

Qualified teams

Seeded teams

1. Australia (2020–21 Finalist, #1)
2. France (2020–21 Finalist, #2)
3. United States (2020–21 Finalist, #4)
4. Czech Republic (2020–21 Finalist, #5)
5. Germany (2020–21 Finalist, #7)
6. Canada (2020–21 Finalist, #9)
7. Spain (2020–21 Finalist, #10)
8. Romania (2020–21 best ranked play-off loser, #11)

Unseeded teams

- Slovakia (2020–21 Finalist, #12)
- Belgium (2020–21 Finalist, #13)
- Latvia (2020–21 play-off winner, #14)
- Great Britain (2020–21 play-off winner, #15)
- Kazakhstan (2020–21 play-off winner, #16)
- Italy (2020–21 play-off winner, #17)
- Poland (2020–21 play-off winner, #19)
- Ukraine (2020–21 play-off winner, #24)
- Netherlands (2020–21 play-off winner, #46)

Home team	Score	Away team	Location	Venue	Surface
Australia [1]	d w/o	Slovakia	double walkover, Australia replaced Russia with bye, Slovakia advanced by walkover		
Italy	3–1	France [2]	Alghero	Tennis Club Alghero	Hard
United States [3]	3–2	Ukraine	Asheville	Asheville Civic Center	Hard (i)
Czech Republic [4]	3–2	Great Britain	Prague	I. Czech Lawn Tennis Club	Clay
Belgium	w/o	Belarus	Belarus suspended, Belgium advanced by walkover		
Kazakhstan	3–1	Germany [6]	Nur-Sultan	Daulet National Tennis Centre	Clay (i)
Canada [7]	4–0	Latvia	Vancouver	Pacific Coliseum	Hard (i)
Netherlands	0–4	Spain [8]	's-Hertogenbosch	Maaspoort	Clay (i)
Poland	4–0	Romania [9]	Radom	Radom Sports Center	Hard (i)

=== Group stage ===
The final draw was held on 8 July 2022 in Glasgow.

Qualified for the Knockout stage

T = Ties, M = Matches, S = Sets

Group	Seeded				Pot 2				Pot 3			
Group	Nation	T	M	S	Nation	T	M	S	Nation	T	M	S
A	Switzerland	2–0	5–1	10–4	Canada	1–1	4–2	9–4	Italy	0–2	0–6	1–12
B	Australia	2–0	5–1	11–3	Slovakia	1–1	3–3	6–8	Belgium	0–2	1–5	4–10
C	Great Britain (H)	1–1	4–2	9–4	Spain	1–1	3–3	6–8	Kazakhstan	1–1	2–4	6–9
D	Czech Republic	2–0	4–2	8–4	United States	1–1	3–3	7–7	Poland	0–2	2–4	5–9

== Billie Jean King Cup play-offs ==
Date: 11–12 November 2022

Sixteen teams played for eight spots in the 2023 qualifying round, in series decided on a home and away basis.

These sixteen teams were:

- 6 losing teams from Qualifying round.
- 7 winning teams from their Group I zone.
- 2 later promoted teams from Zonal Group I (Serbia and Mexico) to fill the vacancy of Russia and Belarus.
- 1 later promoted team from Zonal Group I (Austria) to fill the vacancy of Great Britain, which was announced as Final hosts.

Eight winners will advance to the 2023 qualifying round while losers will contest in their respective regional Group I event in 2023.

Seeded teams

- France (#2)
- Germany (#10)
- Romania (#13)
- Latvia (#16)
- Japan (#18)
- Brazil (#19)
- China (#20)
- Serbia (#21)

Unseeded teams

- Mexico (#22)
- Argentina (#23)
- Hungary (#24)
- Ukraine (#26)
- Croatia (#29)
- Austria (#33)
- Slovenia (#36)
- Netherlands (#37)

Ties were announced on June 16.

Home team	Score	Away team	Location	Venue	Surface
France [1]	3–1	Netherlands	Le Portel	Le Chaudron	Hard (i)
Croatia	1–3	Germany [2]	Rijeka	Centar Zamet	Hard (i)
Romania [3]	4–0	Hungary	Oradea	Sala Polivalentă	Hard (i)
Austria	3–2	Latvia [4]	Schwechat	Multiversum Schwechat	Clay (i)
Japan [5]	1–3	Ukraine	Tokyo	Ariake Coliseum	Hard (i)
Argentina	1–3	Brazil [6]	Tucumán	Lawn Tennis Club	Clay
Slovenia	3–1	China [7]	Velenje	Bela Dvorana	Clay (i)
Mexico	4–0	Serbia [8]	San Luis Potosí	Club Deportivo Potosino	Clay

== Americas Zone ==
=== Group I ===
Venue: Salinas Golf and Tennis Club, Salinas, Ecuador (hard)

Dates: 13–16 April 2022

Participating teams

Pool A

- Argentina
- Brazil
- Colombia
- Guatemala

Pool B

- Chile
- Ecuador
- Mexico
- Paraguay

==== Play-offs ====
- Brazil and Argentina advanced to the Billie Jean King Cup play-offs, while Mexico was later promoted.
- Paraguay and Ecuador were relegated to Americas Zone Group II in 2023.

=== Group II ===
Venue: Centro Nacional de Tenis Parque del Este, Santo Domingo Este, Dominican Republic (hard)

Dates: 25–30 July 2022

Participating teams

Pool A

- Bahamas
- Bermuda
- Dominican Republic
- El Salvador

Pool B

- Cuba
- Peru
- Venezuela
- U.S. Virgin Islands

Pool C

- Aruba
- Bolivia
- Panama
- Puerto Rico

Pool D

- Barbados
- Costa Rica
- Honduras
- Jamaica
- Uruguay

Withdrawn

- Trinidad and Tobago

Inactive teams

- Antigua and Barbuda
- Eastern Caribbean
- Haiti

==== Play-offs ====
- Bolivia and Peru were promoted to Americas Zone Group I in 2023.

== Asia/Oceania Zone ==
=== Group I ===
Venue: Megasaray Tennis Academy, Antalya, Turkey (clay)

Dates: 12–16 April 2022

Participating teams

Pool A

- China
- India
- Indonesia
- Japan
- New Zealand
- South Korea

==== Promotions/Relegations ====
- China and Japan advanced to the Billie Jean King Cup play-offs.
- Indonesia and New Zealand were relegated to Asia/Oceania Zone Group II in 2023.

=== Group II ===
Venue 1: National Tennis Center, Kuala Lumpur, Malaysia (hard)
Venue 2: Central Stadium Frunze, Dushanbe, Tajikistan (hard)

Dates: 8–13 August 2022 (Kuala Lumpur) / 22–27 August 2022 (Dushanbe)

Participating teams

Kuala Lumpur
Pool A

- Chinese Taipei
- Hong Kong
- Iran
- Laos
- Vietnam

Pool B

- Malaysia
- Maldives
- Pacific Oceania
- Singapore
- Thailand

Dushanbe
Pool A

- Brunei
- Guam
- Sri Lanka
- Uzbekistan

Pool B

- Mongolia
- Pakistan
- Tajikistan
- Turkmenistan

Withdrawn

- Cambodia
- Iraq
- Lebanon
- Macau
- Oman
- Philippines

Inactive teams

- Bahrain
- Bangladesh
- Jordan
- Kyrgyzstan
- Syria

==== Play-offs ====
- Thailand and Uzbekistan were promoted to Asia/Oceania Zone Group I in 2023.

== Europe/Africa Zone ==
=== Group I ===
Venue: Megasaray Tennis Academy, Antalya, Turkey (clay)

Dates: 11–16 April 2022

Participating teams

Pool A

- Denmark
- Estonia
- Hungary
- Serbia
- Turkey

Pool B

- Austria
- Bulgaria
- Croatia
- Georgia
- Slovenia
- Sweden

==== Play-offs ====
- Hungary, Slovenia, and Croatia advanced to the Billie Jean King Cup play-offs, while Serbia and Austria were later promoted.
- Estonia and Georgia were relegated to Europe/Africa Zone Group II in 2023.

=== Group II ===
Venue: Vierumäki, Finland (indoor hard)

Dates: 12–15 April 2022

Participating teams

Pool A

- Egypt
- Greece
- Norway

Pool B

- Finland
- Israel
- Lithuania
- Luxembourg

Withdrawn

- Tunisia

==== Play-offs ====
- Norway and Egypt were promoted to Europe/Africa Zone Group I in 2023.
- Finland and Luxembourg were relegated to Europe/Africa Zone Group III in 2023.

=== Group III ===
Venue 1: Bellevue Tennis Club, Ulcinj, Montenegro (clay)
Venue 2: Tennis Club Jug, Skopje, North Macedonia (clay)

Dates: 7–11 June 2022 (Ulcinj) / 5–10 July 2022 (Skopje)

Participating teams

Ulcinj
Pool A

- Bosnia and Herzegovina
- Montenegro
- Nigeria

Pool B

- Algeria
- Azerbaijan
- Cyprus
- Ghana

Pool C

- Armenia
- Mauritius
- Moldova
- Morocco

Skopje
Pool A

- Iceland
- Ireland
- Seychelles

Pool B

- Burundi
- Malta
- Portugal

Pool C

- Botswana
- North Macedonia
- South Africa
- Uganda

Pool D

- Albania
- Kenya
- Kosovo
- Namibia

Withdrawn

- Cameroon
- Congo
- DR Congo
- Mozambique
- Rwanda
- Sudan
- Tanzania
- Zimbabwe

Inactive Teams

- Lesotho
- Madagascar
- Senegal
- Liechtenstein
- Ethiopia
- San Marino

==== Play-offs ====
- Bosnia and Herzegovina and Portugal were promoted to Europe/Africa Zone Group II in 2023.
