= Inès Bekrar =

Algerian tennis player (born 2003)

Ines Bekrar
- Country (sports): Algeria
- Born: 11 May 2003 (age 23)
- Prize money: US$1,249

Singles
- Career record: 4–4
- Career titles: 0

Grand Slam singles results
- US Open Junior: Q1 (2021)

Doubles
- Career record: 2–2

Team competitions
- Fed Cup: 12–8
- Last updated on: 17 June 2024.

Ines Bekrar (born 11 May 2003) is an Algerian junior tennis player.

== Career ==
=== Junior years ===
Bekrar has a career-high ITF juniors ranking of 93, achieved on 4 January 2021.

== ITF junior finals ==
Grand Slam
Category GA
Category G1
Category G2
Category G3
Category G4
Category G5

=== Singles (2–2) ===
Outcome	No.	Date	Tournament	Grade	Surface	Opponent	Score
Runner-up	1.	6 October 2018	Algiers, Algeria	G5	Clay	(Tunisia) Feryel Ben Hassen	6–7^{(0–7)}, 4–6
Winner	1.	6 October 2019	Algiers, Algeria	G5	Clay	(Tunisia) Wiem Boubaker	6–1, 6–2
Winner	2.	16 February 2020	Pretoria, South Africa	B2	Hard	(Egypt) Yasmin Ezzat	6–3, 6–4
Runner-up	2.	6 June 2021	Hammamet, Tunisia	B2	Clay	(Switzerland) Céline Naef	2–6, 0–6

=== Doubles (3–4) ===
Outcome	No.	Date	Tournament	Grade	Surface	Partner	Opponents	Score
Winner	1.	24 February 2018	Algiers, Algeria	G5	Clay	(Spain) Lucia Llinares Domingo	(Italy) Linda Alessi (Italy) Chiara Girelli	6–3, 6–1
Winner	2.	8 September 2018	Biot, France	G5	Clay	(France) Astrid Cirotte	(Tunisia) Sarra Ata (Estonia) Aurelia Riga	7–5, 5–7, [10–6]
Runner-up	1.	13 October 2018	Mostaganem, Algeria	G5	Hard	(Tunisia) Sarra Ata	(Tunisia) Ferdaous Bahri (Tunisia) Feriel Mahbouli	4–6, 5–7
Runner-up	2.	3 February 2019	Cairo, Egypt	G5	Clay	(Morocco) Yasmine Kabbaj	(Russia) Maria Dzemeshkevich (Republic of Ireland) Shauna Heffernan	3–6, 6–7^{(2–7)}
Runner-up	3.	23 August 2019	Cairo, Egypt	G3	Clay	(Tunisia) Sarah Lisa Aubertin	(Finland) Laura Hietaranta (Russia) Maria Sholokhova	6–7^{(4–7)}, 3–6
Winner	3.	6 October 2019	Algiers, Algeria	G5	Clay	(Tunisia) Ghaida Jeribi	(Morocco) Aya El Aouni (Morocco) Manal Ennaciri	3–6, 6–1, [10–8]
Runner-up	4.	26 October 2019	Rabat, Morocco	G4	Clay	(Morocco) Salma Loudili	(Spain) Claudia De Las Heras Armenteras (Spain) Leyre Romero Gormaz	2–6, 6–2, [8–10]

== National representation ==
=== Fed Cup ===
Bekrar made her Fed Cup debut for Algeria in 2019, while the team was competing in the Europe/Africa Zone Group III, when she was 15 years and 340 days old.

==== Fed Cup (12–8) ====
Group membership World Group (0–0) World Group Play-off (0–0) World Group II (0–0) World Group II Play-off (0–0) Europe/Africa Group (12–8)	Matches by surface Hard (8–6) Clay (4–2) Grass (0–0) Carpet (0–0)	Matches by type Singles (7–6) Doubles (5–2)	Matches by setting Indoors (8–6) Outdoors (4–2)

==== Singles (7–6) ====
Edition	Stage	Date	Location	Against	Surface	Opponent	W/L	Score
2019 Fed Cup; Europe/Africa Zone Group III	Pool B	16 April 2019	Helsinki, Finland	Cyprus	Hard (i)	Eleni Louka	L	3–6, 3–6
2019 Fed Cup; Europe/Africa Zone Group III	Pool B	17 April 2019	Helsinki, Finland	Kosovo	Hard (i)	Donika Bashota	L	2–6, 3–6
2019 Fed Cup; Europe/Africa Zone Group III	Pool B	18 April 2019	Helsinki, Finland	North Macedonia	Hard (i)	Magdalena Stoilkovska	L	6–3, 3–6, 0–6
2019 Fed Cup; Europe/Africa Zone Group III	Pool B	19 April 2019	Helsinki, Finland	(Republic of the Congo) Congo	Hard (i)	Anabel Ossombi	W	7–5, 7–6^{(7–2)}
2019 Fed Cup; Europe/Africa Zone Group III	Play-off	20 April 2019	Helsinki, Finland	Iceland	Hard (i)	Anna Soffía Grönholm	W	7–6^{(7–0)}, 6–3
2020–21 Billie Jean King Cup; Europe/Africa Zone Group III	Pool E	15 June 2021	Vilnius, Lithuania	Zimbabwe	Hard (i)	Tadiwanashe Mauchi	W	6–2, 6–2
2020–21 Billie Jean King Cup; Europe/Africa Zone Group III	Pool E	16 June 2021	Vilnius, Lithuania	Kenya	Hard (i)	Alicia Owegi	W	6–1, 6–3
2020–21 Billie Jean King Cup; Europe/Africa Zone Group III	Pool E	17 June 2021	Vilnius, Lithuania	Malta	Hard (i)	Francesca Curmi	L	4–6, 6–2, 4–6
2020–21 Billie Jean King Cup; Europe/Africa Zone Group III	Play-off	19 June 2021	Vilnius, Lithuania	Montenegro	Hard (i)	Tea Nikčević	W	6–3, 6–0
2022 Billie Jean King Cup; Europe/Africa Zone Group III	Pool B	7 June 2022	Ulcinj, Montenegro	Ghana	Clay	Elizabeth Bagerbaseh	W	6–1, 6–2
2022 Billie Jean King Cup; Europe/Africa Zone Group III	Pool B	8 June 2022	Ulcinj, Montenegro	Azerbaijan	Clay	Lala Eyvazova	W	6–0, 6–0
2022 Billie Jean King Cup; Europe/Africa Zone Group III	Pool B	10 June 2022	Ulcinj, Montenegro	Cyprus	Clay	Klio Ioannou	L	7–5, 3–6, 3–6
2022 Billie Jean King Cup; Europe/Africa Zone Group III	Play-off	10 June 2022	Ulcinj, Montenegro	Morocco	Clay	Yasmine Kabbaj	L	1–6, 3–6

==== Doubles (5–2) ====
Edition	Stage	Date	Location	Against	Surface	Partner	Opponents	W/L	Score
2019 Fed Cup; Europe/Africa Zone Group III	Pool B	16 April 2019	Helsinki, Finland	Cyprus	Hard (i)	Yassamine Boudjadi	Eleni Louka; Raluca Șerban	L	0–6, 2–6
2019 Fed Cup; Europe/Africa Zone Group III	Pool B	17 April 2019	Helsinki, Finland	Kosovo	Hard (i)	Yassamine Boudjadi	Vesa Gjinaj; Arlinda Rushiti	W	1–6, 6–4, 7–6^{(7–5)}
2019 Fed Cup; Europe/Africa Zone Group III	Pool B	18 April 2019	Helsinki, Finland	North Macedonia	Hard (i)	Yassamine Boudjadi	Lina Gjorcheska; Magdalena Stoilkovska	L	1–6, 2–6
2019 Fed Cup; Europe/Africa Zone Group III	Pool B	19 April 2019	Helsinki, Finland	(Republic of the Congo) Congo	Hard (i)	Yassamine Boudjadi	Victoire Mfoumouangana; Anabel Ossombi	W	6–1, 6–1
2020–21 Billie Jean King Cup; Europe/Africa Zone Group III	Pool E	15 June 2021	Vilnius, Lithuania	Zimbabwe	Hard (i)	Inès Ibbou	Tadiwanashe Mauchi; Tanyaradzwa Midzi	W	6–2, 6–0
2022 Billie Jean King Cup; Europe/Africa Zone Group III	Pool B	7 June 2022	Ulcinj, Montenegro	Ghana	Clay	Lynda Benkaddour	Elizabeth Bagerbaseh; Ruth Crawford	W	6–3, 6–4
2022 Billie Jean King Cup; Europe/Africa Zone Group III	Pool B	8 June 2022	Ulcinj, Montenegro	Azerbaijan	Clay	Amira Benaïssa	Aydan Ibrahimova; Zuleykha Safarova	W	6–1, 6–1
