= 2022 Billie Jean King Cup Europe/Africa Zone Group III – Pool C (Skopje) =

Subsection of tennis competition

Pool C (Skopje) of the 2022 Billie Jean King Cup Europe/Africa Zone Group III was one of four pools in the Europe/Africa zone of the 2022 Billie Jean King Cup. Four teams competed in a round robin competition, with each team proceeding to their respective sections of the play-offs: the top team played for advancement to Group II in 2023.

== Standings ==
		MKD	RSA	BOT	UGA	RR; W–L	Set; W–L	Game; W–L	Standings
6	North Macedonia		2–1	3–0	3–0	3–0	16–3 (84%)	101–34 (75%)	1
3	South Africa	1–2		3–0	3–0	2–1	15–4 (79%)	98–38 (72%)	2
–	Botswana	0–3	0–3		3–0	1–2	6–12 (33%)	51–75 (40%)	3
11	Uganda	0–3	0–3	0–3		0–3	0–18 (0%)	5–108 (4%)	4

Standings are determined by: 1. number of wins; 2. number of matches; 3. in two-team ties, head-to-head records; 4. in three-team ties, (a) percentage of matches won (head-to-head records if two teams remain tied), then (b) percentage of sets won (head-to-head records if two teams remain tied), then (c) percentage of games won (head-to-head records if two teams remain tied), then (d) Billie Jean King Cup rankings.

== Round-robin ==
=== South Africa vs. Botswana ===
South Africa
3
Tennis Club Jug, Skopje, North Macedonia
5 July 2022
Clay

Botswana
0

			1	2	3
1	(South Africa) (Botswana)	Heike Janse van Vuuren; Chelsea Chakanyuka	6; 1	6; 2
2	(South Africa) (Botswana)	Chanel Simmonds; Ekua Youri	6; 1	6; 3
3	(South Africa) (Botswana)	Heike Janse van Vuuren / Leigh van Zyl; Chelsea Chakanyuka / Cheludo Leungo Monnayoo	6; 0	6; 0

=== North Macedonia vs. Uganda ===
North Macedonia
3
Tennis Club Jug, Skopje, North Macedonia
5 July 2022
Clay

Uganda
0

			1	2	3
1	(North Macedonia) (Uganda)	Magdalena Stoilkovska; Maggie Flavia Namaganda	6; 0	6; 0
2	(North Macedonia) (Uganda)	Lina Gjorcheska; Winnie Birungi	6; 0	6; 0
3	(North Macedonia) (Uganda)	Katarina Marinkovikj / Aleksandra Simeva; Winnie Birungi / Maggie Flavia Namaganda	6; 0	6; 0

=== South Africa vs. Uganda ===
South Africa
3
Tennis Club Jug, Skopje, North Macedonia
6 July 2022
Clay

Uganda
0

			1	2	3
1	(South Africa) (Uganda)	Naledi Manyube; Maggie Flavia Namaganda	6; 0	6; 0
2	(South Africa) (Uganda)	Leigh van Zyl; Winnie Birungi	6; 1	6; 1
3	(South Africa) (Uganda)	Ilze Hattingh / Chanel Simmonds; Winnie Birungi / Maggie Flavia Namaganda	6; 0	6; 0

=== North Macedonia vs. Botswana ===
North Macedonia
3
Tennis Club Jug, Skopje, North Macedonia
6 July 2022
Clay

Botswana
0

			1	2	3
1	(North Macedonia) (Botswana)	Magdalena Stoilkovska; Chelsea Chakanyuka	6; 3	6; 2
2	(North Macedonia) (Botswana)	Lina Gjorcheska; Ekua Youri	6; 1	6; 1
3	(North Macedonia) (Botswana)	Lina Gjorcheska / Magdalena Stoilkovska; Chelsea Chakanyuka / Ekua Youri	6; 1	6; 0

=== South Africa vs. North Macedonia ===
South Africa
1
Tennis Club Jug, Skopje, North Macedonia
7 July 2022
Clay

North Macedonia
2

			1	2	3
1	(South Africa) (North Macedonia)	Heike Janse van Vuuren; Magdalena Stoilkovska	6; 2	6; 0
2	(South Africa) (North Macedonia)	Chanel Simmonds; Lina Gjorcheska	2; 6	0; 6
3	(South Africa) (North Macedonia)	Ilze Hattingh / Chanel Simmonds; Lina Gjorcheska / Magdalena Stoilkovska	6; 3	3; 6	3; 6

=== Botswana vs. Uganda ===
Botswana
3
Tennis Club Jug, Skopje, North Macedonia
7 July 2022
Clay

Uganda
0

			1	2	3
1	(Botswana) (Uganda)	Chelsea Chakanyuka; Maggie Flavia Namaganda	6; 1	6; 0
2	(Botswana) (Uganda)	Ekua Youri; Winnie Birungi	6; 0	6; 0
3	(Botswana) (Uganda)	Cheludo Leungo Monnayoo / Ekua Youri; Winnie Birungi / Maggie Flavia Namaganda	6; 1	6; 1
