= 2022 Billie Jean King Cup Europe/Africa Zone Group III – Pool B (Ulcinj) =

Subsection of tennis competition

Pool B (Ulcinj) of the 2022 Billie Jean King Cup Europe/Africa Zone Group III was one of three pools in the Europe/Africa zone of the 2022 Billie Jean King Cup. Four teams competed in a round robin competition, with each team proceeding to their respective sections of the play-offs: the top team played for advancement to Group II in 2023.

== Standings ==
		ALG	CYP	GHA	AZE	RR; W–L	Set; W–L	Game; W–L	Standings
5	Algeria		2–1	3–0	3–0	3–0	17–2 (89%)	109–39 (74%)	1
2	Cyprus	1–2		3–0	3–0	2–1	14–6 (70%)	103–68 (60%)	2
–	Ghana	0–3	0–3		2–0	1–2	5–12 (29%)	64–79 (45%)	3
7	Azerbaijan	0–3	0–3	0–2		0–3	0–16 (0%)	6–96 (6%)	4

Standings are determined by: 1. number of wins; 2. number of matches; 3. in two-team ties, head-to-head records; 4. in three-team ties, (a) percentage of matches won (head-to-head records if two teams remain tied), then (b) percentage of sets won (head-to-head records if two teams remain tied), then (c) percentage of games won (head-to-head records if two teams remain tied), then (d) Billie Jean King Cup rankings.

== Round-robin ==
=== Cyprus vs. Azerbaijan ===
Cyprus
3
Bellevue Tennis Club, Ulcinj, Montenegro
7 June 2022
Clay

Azerbaijan
0

			1	2	3
1	(Cyprus) (Azerbaijan)	Klio Maria Ioannou; Aydan Ibrahimova	6; 0	6; 0
2	(Cyprus) (Azerbaijan)	Maria Constantinou; Zuleykha Safarova	6; 0	6; 0
3	(Cyprus) (Azerbaijan)	Anna Demirtzi / Victoria Savvides; Aydan Ibrahimova / Zuleykha Safarova	6; 2	6; 1

=== Algeria vs. Ghana ===
Algeria
3
Bellevue Tennis Club, Ulcinj, Montenegro
7 June 2022
Clay

Ghana
0

			1	2	3
1	(Algeria) (Ghana)	Inès Bekrar; Elizabeth Kapari Bagerbaseh	6; 1	6; 2
2	(Algeria) (Ghana)	Amira Benaïssa; Ruth Crawford	6; 0	6; 2
3	(Algeria) (Ghana)	Inès Bekrar / Lynda Benkaddour; Elizabeth Kapar Bagerbaseh / Ruth Crawford	6; 3	6; 4

=== Cyprus vs. Ghana ===
Cyprus
3
Bellevue Tennis Club, Ulcinj, Montenegro
8 June 2022
Clay

Ghana
0

			1	2	3
1	(Cyprus) (Ghana)	Klio Maria Ioannou; Elizabeth Kapari Bagerbaseh	6; 2	6; 2
2	(Cyprus) (Ghana)	Maria Constantinou; Ruth Crawford	6; 4	4; 6	7^{7} 6^{3}
3	(Cyprus) (Ghana)	Anna Demirtzi / Victoria Savvides; Elizabeth Kapari Bagerbaseh / Naa Anyema Mckorley	7; 5	6; 3

=== Algeria vs. Azerbaijan ===
Algeria
3
Bellevue Tennis Club, Ulcinj, Montenegro
8 June 2022
Clay

Azerbaijan
0

			1	2	3
1	(Algeria) (Azerbaijan)	Inès Bekrar; Lala Eyvazova	6; 0	6; 0
2	(Algeria) (Azerbaijan)	Amira Benaïssa; Zuleykha Safarova	6; 0	6; 0
3	(Algeria) (Azerbaijan)	Inès Bekrar / Amira Benaïssa; Aydan Ibrahimova / Zuleykha Safarova	6; 1	6; 1

=== Cyprus vs. Algeria ===
Cyprus
1
Bellevue Tennis Club, Ulcinj, Montenegro
10 June 2022
Clay

Algeria
2

			1	2	3
1	(Cyprus) (Algeria)	Klio Maria Ioannou; Inès Bekrar	5; 7	6; 3	6; 3
2	(Cyprus) (Algeria)	Maria Constantinou; Amira Benaïssa	3; 6	1; 6
3	(Cyprus) (Algeria)	Maria Constantinou / Victoria Savvides; Amira Benaïssa / Inès Ibbou	2; 6	2; 6

=== Azerbaijan vs. Ghana ===
Azerbaijan
0
Bellevue Tennis Club, Ulcinj, Montenegro
10 June 2022
Clay

Ghana
2

			1	2	3
1	(Azerbaijan) (Ghana)	Lala Eyvazova; Elizabeth Kapari Bagerbaseh	1; 2			retired
2	(Azerbaijan) (Ghana)	Aydan Ibrahimova; Ruth Crawford	0; 6	0; 6
3	(Azerbaijan) (Ghana)	Lala Eyvazova / Aydan Ibrahimova; Elizabeth Kapari Bagerbaseh / Ruth Crawford				not played
