= Oyinlomo Quadre =

Nigerian tennis player (born 2003)

- Full name: Barakat Oyinlomo Quadre
- Country (sports): Nigeria
- Born: 1 May 2003 (age 23)
- Plays: Right (two–handed backhand)
- College: FIU (2022– )
- Prize money: $6,484

Singles
- Career record: 17–21
- Highest ranking: No. 940 (4 November 2019)

Doubles
- Career record: 9–14
- Highest ranking: No. 1150 (29 October 2018)

Team competitions
- Fed Cup: 20–6
Medal record
Women's tennis
Representing Nigeria
African Games
Bronze medal – third place	2019 Rabat	Women's doubles
Bronze medal – third place	2019 Rabat	Women's team
- Last updated on: 12 August 2024.

Barakat Oyinlomo Quadre (born 1 May 2003) is a Nigerian tennis player. In March 2018, she was ranked number one in Nigeria, ninth in Africa and No. 945 in singles.

Quadre has represented Nigeria in the Billie Jean King Cup, making her debut in 2021.

== Career ==
Quadre began playing tennis at age 4. As a junior player, she was ranked 173rd on 17 June 2019. At the 2015 ITF Junior Championship in Morocco, Quadre established herself as one of Africa's best junior tennis players, and secured a scholarship to High Performance Center in Morocco. At the 2016 ITF U-18 Championship, Quadre made the quarterfinals. In 2017, defeated Chakira Dermane of Togo 6–0, 6–0 to set a quarterfinal clash with Sophia Biolay from France. At national level, she was chosen to represent Nigeria at the 2016 Africa Junior Tennis Championship. She won the ITF U-16 Championship in Togo.

At the 2018 Lagos Open, Quadre defeated Airhunmwunde 6–1, 6–0 to qualify for the second round. In her next game, she lost to Anna Sisková and crashed out of the tournament.

== ITF Circuit finals ==
Legend
W15 tournaments

=== Doubles: 1 (runner-up) ===
Result	Date	Tournament	Tier	Surface	Partner	Opponents	Score
Loss	Apr 2022	ITF Monastir, Tunisia	W15	Hard	(China) Yang Yidi	(United States) Dasha Ivanova; Ekaterina Yashina	4–6, 7–6^{(1)}, [4–10]

== ITF Junior finals ==
Category G2
Category G3
Category G4
Category G5

=== Singles (9–1) ===
Outcome	No.	Date	Tournament	Grade	Surface	Opponent	Score
Winner	1.	Sep 2016	Cotonou, Benin	G4	Hard	(Benin) Carmine Becoudé	6–0, 6–0
Winner	2.	Sep 2016	Lomé, Togo	G4	Hard	(Benin) Carmine Becoudé	6–2, 6–2
Winner	3.	Sep 2016	Lomé, Togo	G5	Hard	(France) Karine Marion Job	6–3, 6–3
Winner	4.	Sep 2018	Accra, Ghana	G5	Hard	(Egypt) Yasmin Ezzat	4–6, 6–1, 6–2
Winner	5.	Sep 2018	Lomé, Togo	G5	Hard	(Denmark) Divine Nweke	6–2, 7–6^{(5)}
Runner-up	1.	Sep 2018	Cotonou, Benin	G4	Hard	(Denmark) Divine Nweke	1–6, 6–3, 2–6
Winner	6.	Apr 2019	Mégrine, Tunisia	G3	Hard	(Russia) Maria Bondarenko	6–7^{(4)}, 6–4, 6–2
Winner	7.	Sep 2019	Cotonou, Benin	G4	Hard	(India) Vipasha Mehra	6–2, 6–1
Winner	8.	Nov 2019	Abuja, Nigeria	G5	Hard	(Nigeria) Marylove Edwards	6–1, 6–0
Winner	9.	Feb 2019	Pretoria, South Africa	G3	Hard	(France) Nahia Berecoechea	6–2, 6–3

=== Doubles (6–6) ===
Outcome	No.	Date	Tournament	Grade	Surface	Partner	Opponents	Score
Winner	1.	Sep 2016	Cotonou, Benin	G4	Hard	(Nigeria) Toyin Shewa Asogba	(Benin) Carmine Becoudé (India) Trisha Vinod	6–4, 7–6^{(4)}
Runner-up	1.	Sep 2016	Lomé, Togo	G5	Hard	(Nigeria) Angel Macleod	(Singapore) Maxine Ng (United States) Aesha Patel	1–6, 3–6
Runner-up	2.	Sep 2017	Cotonou, Benin	G4	Hard	(Nigeria) Adetayo Adetunji	(Finland) Alexandra Anttila (Serbia) Doroteja Joksović	3–6, 6–2, 8–10
Runner-up	3.	Sep 2018	Lomé, Togo	G4	Hard	(Egypt) Yasmin Ezzat	(Benin) Carmine Becoudé (Denmark) Divine Nweke	3–6, 4–6
Winner	2.	Sep 2018	Lomé, Togo	G5	Hard	(Cameroon) Anna Lorie Lemongo Toumbou	(Benin) Carmine Becoudé (Denmark) Divine Nweke	7–5, 6–2
Winner	3.	Sep 2018	Cotonou, Benin	G4	Hard	(Cameroon) Anna Lorie Lemongo Toumbou	(Benin) Gauri Bhagia (Denmark) Bhakti Parwani	6–3, 6–2
Runner-up	4.	Nov 2018	Oujda, Morocco	G5	Clay	(Morocco) Salma Loudili	(Morocco) InesBachir El Bouhali (Morocco) Hind Semlali	2–6, 4–6
Runner-up	5.	Apr 2019	Tlemcen, Algeria	G2	Clay	(Morocco) Salma Loudili	(Italy) Matilde Mariani (Italy) Asia Serafini	7–6^{(4)}, 4–6, 6–10
Winner	4.	Sep 2019	Cotonou, Benin	G4	Hard	(Egypt) Yasmin Ezzat	(Benin) Carmine Becoudé (Cameroon) Manuella Peguy Eloundou Nga	6–1, 6–4
Winner	5.	Nov 2019	Abuja, Nigeria	G5	Hard	(Nigeria) Marylove Edwards	(Nigeria) Jesutoyosi Adeusi (Nigeria) Omolayo Bamidele	6–0, 6–1
Runner-up	6.	Feb 2020	Pretoria, South Africa	G3	Hard	(Morocco) Salma Loudili	(Morocco) Sara Akid (Morocco) Yasmine Kabbaj	6–7^{(5)} 6–1, 10–12
Winner	6.	Feb 2020	Pretoria, South Africa	G3	Hard	(Cameroon) Anna Lorie Lemongo Toumbou	(Morocco) Sara Akid (Morocco) Yasmine Kabbaj	6–3, 6–1

Sporting positions
Preceded by (Ukraine) Yulia Starodubtseva	C-USA Tennis Player of the Year; 2023	Succeeded by Incumbent
Preceded by (Morocco) Yasmine Kabbaj	C-USA Tennis Freshman of the Year; 2023	Succeeded by Incumbent
