= 2022 Billie Jean King Cup Europe/Africa Zone Group III – Pool A (Skopje) =

Subsection of tennis competition

Pool A (Skopje) of the 2022 Billie Jean King Cup Europe/Africa Zone Group III was one of four pools in the Europe/Africa zone of the 2022 Billie Jean King Cup. Three teams competed in a round robin competition, with each team proceeding to their respective sections of the play-offs: the top team played for advancement to Group II in 2023.

== Standings ==
| | | IRL | ISL | SEY | RR; W–L | Set; W–L | Game; W–L | Standings |
| 1 | Ireland | | 3–0 | 3–0 | 2–0 | 12–0 (100%) | 72–11 (87%) | 1 |
| 7 | Iceland | 0–3 | | 3–0 | 1–1 | 6–6 (50%) | 45–38 (54%) | 2 |
| – | Seychelles | 0–3 | 0–3 | | 0–2 | 0–12 (0%) | 4–72 (5%) | 3 |

Standings are determined by: 1. number of wins; 2. number of matches; 3. in two-team ties, head-to-head records; 4. in three-team ties, (a) percentage of matches won (head-to-head records if two teams remain tied), then (b) percentage of sets won (head-to-head records if two teams remain tied), then (c) percentage of games won (head-to-head records if two teams remain tied), then (d) Billie Jean King Cup rankings.

== Round-robin ==
=== Ireland vs. Seychelles ===
Ireland
3
Tennis Club Jug, Skopje, North Macedonia
5 July 2022
Clay

Seychelles
0

| | | | 1 | 2 | 3 |
|---|---|---|---|---|---|
| 1 | (Republic of Ireland) (Seychelles) | Carragh Courtney; Cylvie Delpech | 6; 0 | 6; 0 |
| 2 | (Republic of Ireland) (Seychelles) | Celine Simunyu; Marie-May Isnard | 6; 0 | 6; 0 |
| 3 | (Republic of Ireland) (Seychelles) | Kate Gardiner / Aisling O'Connor; Marie-May Isnard / Fatime Kanté | 6; 0 | 6; 2 |

=== Iceland vs. Seychelles ===
Iceland
3
Tennis Club Jug, Skopje, North Macedonia
6 July 2022
Clay

Seychelles
0

| | | | 1 | 2 | 3 |
|---|---|---|---|---|---|
| 1 | (Iceland) (Seychelles) | Hera Brynjarsdóttir; Cylvie Delpech | 6; 1 | 6; 0 |
| 2 | (Iceland) (Seychelles) | Anna Soffia Grönholm; Fatime Kanté | 6; 1 | 6; 0 |
| 3 | (Iceland) (Seychelles) | Hera Brynjarsdóttir / Anna Soffia Grönholm; Marie-May Isnard / Fatime Kanté | 6; 0 | 6; 0 |

=== Ireland vs. Iceland ===
Ireland
3
Tennis Club Jug, Skopje, North Macedonia
7 July 2022
Clay

Iceland
0

| | | | 1 | 2 | 3 |
|---|---|---|---|---|---|
| 1 | (Republic of Ireland) (Iceland) | Carragh Courtney; Hera Brynjarsdóttir | 6; 0 | 6; 1 |
| 2 | (Republic of Ireland) (Iceland) | Celine Simunyu; Anna Soffia Grönholm | 6; 2 | 6; 0 |
| 3 | (Republic of Ireland) (Iceland) | Kate Gardiner / Shauna Heffernan; Hera Brynjarsdóttir / Anna Soffia Grönholm | 6; 4 | 6; 2 |
