= 2022 Billie Jean King Cup Europe/Africa Zone Group III – Pool A (Ulcinj) =

Subsection of tennis competition

Pool A (Ulcinj) of the 2022 Billie Jean King Cup Europe/Africa Zone Group III was one of three pools in the Europe/Africa zone of the 2022 Billie Jean King Cup. Three teams competed in a round robin competition, with each team proceeding to their respective sections of the play-offs: the top team played for advancement to Group II in 2023.

== Standings ==
		BIH	MNE	NGR	RR; W–L	Set; W–L	Game; W–L	Standings
4	Bosnia and Herzegovina		2–0	3–0	2–0	10–0 (100%)	60–8 (88%)	1
1	Montenegro	0–2		3–0	1–1	6–4 (60%)	40–40 (50%)	2
8	Nigeria	0–3	0–3		0–2	0–12 (0%)	22–74 (23%)	3

Standings are determined by: 1. number of wins; 2. number of matches; 3. in two-team ties, head-to-head records; 4. in three-team ties, (a) percentage of matches won (head-to-head records if two teams remain tied), then (b) percentage of sets won (head-to-head records if two teams remain tied), then (c) percentage of games won (head-to-head records if two teams remain tied), then (d) Billie Jean King Cup rankings.

== Round-robin ==
=== Montenegro vs. Nigeria ===
Montenegro
3
Bellevue Tennis Club, Ulcinj, Montenegro
7 June 2022
Clay

Nigeria
0

			1	2	3
1	(Montenegro) (Nigeria)	Iva Lakić; Adetayo Adetunji	6; 0	6; 0
2	(Montenegro) (Nigeria)	Divna Ratković; Adesuwa Osabuohien	6; 2	6; 2
3	(Montenegro) (Nigeria)	Iva Lakić / Petra Mirković; Adetayo Adetunji / Adesuwa Osabuohien	7^{7} 6^{4}	7^{8} 6^{6}

=== Bosnia and Herzegovina vs. Nigeria ===
Bosnia and Herzegovina
3
Bellevue Tennis Club, Ulcinj, Montenegro
8 June 2022
Clay

Nigeria
0

			1	2	3
1	(Bosnia and Herzegovina) (Nigeria)	Nefisa Berberović; Adetayo Adetunji	6; 0	6; 1
2	(Bosnia and Herzegovina) (Nigeria)	Dea Herdželaš; Adesuwa Osabuohien	6; 3	3; 2		retired
3	(Bosnia and Herzegovina) (Nigeria)	Anastasija Ignjatić / Suana Tucaković; Adetayo Adetunji / Adesuwa Osabuohien	6; 0	6; 0		w/o

=== Montenegro vs. Bosnia and Herzegovina ===
Montenegro
0
Bellevue Tennis Club, Ulcinj, Montenegro
10 June 2022
Clay

Bosnia and Herzegovina
2

			1	2	3
1	(Montenegro) (Bosnia and Herzegovina)	Petra Mirković; Nefisa Berberović	0; 6	0; 6
2	(Montenegro) (Bosnia and Herzegovina)	Iva Lakić; Dea Herdželaš	0; 6	2; 6
3	(Montenegro) (Bosnia and Herzegovina)	Iva Lakić / Petra Mirković; Anastasija Ignjatić / Suana Tucaković				not played
