= 2022 Billie Jean King Cup Europe/Africa Zone Group III – Pool C (Ulcinj) =

Subsection of tennis competition

Pool C (Ulcinj) of the 2022 Billie Jean King Cup Europe/Africa Zone Group III was one of three pools in the Europe/Africa zone of the 2022 Billie Jean King Cup. Four teams competed in a round robin competition, with each team proceeding to their respective sections of the play-offs: the top team played for advancement to Group II in 2023.

== Standings ==
		MAR	MDA	ARM	MRI	RR; W–L	Set; W–L	Game; W–L	Standings
6	Morocco		3–0	2–0	3–0	3–0	16–0 (100%)	97–34 (74%)	1
9	Moldova	0–3		2–1	2–0	2–1	8–8 (50%)	68–61 (53%)	2
3	Armenia	0–2	1–2		2–1	1–2	6–10 (38%)	55–69 (44%)	3
–	Mauritius	0–3	0–2	1–2		0–3	2–14 (13%)	32–88 (27%)	4

Standings are determined by: 1. number of wins; 2. number of matches; 3. in two-team ties, head-to-head records; 4. in three-team ties, (a) percentage of matches won (head-to-head records if two teams remain tied), then (b) percentage of sets won (head-to-head records if two teams remain tied), then (c) percentage of games won (head-to-head records if two teams remain tied), then (d) Billie Jean King Cup rankings.

== Round-robin ==
=== Armenia vs. Moldova ===
Armenia
1
Bellevue Tennis Club, Ulcinj, Montenegro
7 June 2022
Clay

Moldova
2

			1	2	3
1	(Armenia) (Moldova)	Gabriella Akopyan; Daniela Ciobanu	0; 6	0; 6
2	(Armenia) (Moldova)	Ani Amiraghyan; Renata Farima	6; 3	6; 0
3	(Armenia) (Moldova)	Gabriella Akopyan / Ani Amiraghyan; Daniela Ciobanu / Arina Gamretkaia	4; 6	3; 6

=== Morocco vs. Mauritius ===
Morocco
3
Bellevue Tennis Club, Ulcinj, Montenegro
7 June 2022
Clay

Mauritius
0

			1	2	3
1	(Morocco) (Mauritius)	Yasmine Kabbaj; Shannon Wong Hon Chan	6; 0	6; 0
2	(Morocco) (Mauritius)	Aya El Aouni; Zara Lennon	6; 1	6; 3
3	(Morocco) (Mauritius)	Rania Azziz / Lina Qostal; Zara Lennon / Shannon Wong Hon Chan	6; 1	6; 4

=== Armenia vs. Mauritius ===
Armenia
2
Bellevue Tennis Club, Ulcinj, Montenegro
8 June 2022
Clay

Mauritius
1

			1	2	3
1	(Armenia) (Mauritius)	Arevik Tumanyan; Zara Lennon	1; 6	3; 6
2	(Armenia) (Mauritius)	Ani Amiraghyan; Tippi Dalle-Grave	6; 0	6; 0
3	(Armenia) (Mauritius)	Gabriella Akopyan / Ani Amiraghyan; Zara Lennon / Shannon Wong Hon Chan	6; 2	6; 4

=== Morocco vs. Moldova ===
Morocco
3
Bellevue Tennis Club, Ulcinj, Montenegro
8 June 2022
Clay

Moldova
0

			1	2	3
1	(Morocco) (Moldova)	Yasmine Kabbaj; Daniela Ciobanu	6; 3	6; 3
2	(Morocco) (Moldova)	Aya El Aouni; Arina Gamretkaia	6; 2	6; 1
3	(Morocco) (Moldova)	Rania Azziz / Yasmine Kabbaj; Daniela Ciobanu / Arina Gamretkaia	6; 3	7; 5

=== Armenia vs. Morocco ===
Armenia
0
Bellevue Tennis Club, Ulcinj, Montenegro
10 June 2022
Clay

Morocco
2

			1	2	3
1	(Armenia) (Morocco)	Gabriella Akopyan; Yasmine Kabbaj	1; 6	0; 6
2	(Armenia) (Morocco)	Ani Amiraghyan; Aya El Aouni	4; 6	3; 1		retired
3	(Armenia) (Morocco)	Ani Amiraghyan / Arevik Tumanyan; Rania Azziz / Yasmine Kabbaj				not played

=== Moldova vs. Mauritius ===
Moldova
2
Bellevue Tennis Club, Ulcinj, Montenegro
10 June 2022
Clay

Mauritius
0

			1	2	3
1	(Moldova) (Mauritius)	Daniela Ciobanu; Zara Lennon	6; 1	6; 2
2	(Moldova) (Mauritius)	Arina Gamretkaia; Tippi Dalle-Grave	6; 1	6; 1
3	(Moldova) (Mauritius)	Daniela Ciobanu / Arina Gamretkaia; Tippi Dalle-Grave / Zara Lennon				not played
