= Seychelles Billie Jean King Cup team =

Tennis team

Seychelles
- First year: 2022
- Years played: 1
- Ties played (W–L): 3 (0–3)
- Best finish: Zonal Group III RR
- Most ties played: Fatime Kanté, Marie-May Isnard (3)
- Most years played: Fatime Kanté, Marie-May Isnard, Cylvie Delpech (1)

The Seychelles Billie Jean King Cup team represents Seychelles in Billie Jean King Cup tennis competition and are governed by the Seychelles Tennis Association. They currently compete in the Europe/Africa Zone of Group III.

== History ==
Seychelles competed in its first Billie Jean King Cup in 2022. Their best result was finishing third in their Group III pool in 2022.

== Players ==
Player	W-L (Total)	W-L (Singles)	W-L (Doubles)	Ties	Debut	Ref
Cylvie Delpech	0–2	0–2		3	2022	
Marie-May Isnard	0–4	0–2	0–2	3	2022	
Fatime Kanté	0–4	0–2	0–2	3	2022	

== Recent performances ==
Here is the list of all match-ups of the Seychelles participation in the Billie Jean King Cup in 2022.

Year	Competition	Date	Surface	Venue	Opponent	Score	Result
2022	Europe/Africa Zone Group III, Pool B	5 July	Clay	Tennis Club Jug (MKD)	Ireland	0–3	Loss
2022	Europe/Africa Zone Group III, Pool B	6 July	Clay	Tennis Club Jug (MKD)	Iceland	0–3	Loss
2022	Europe/Africa Zone Group III, Semifinals	8 July	Clay	Tennis Club Jug (MKD)	Burundi	0–2	Loss
2022	Europe/Africa Zone Group III, 11th place play-off	9 July	Clay	Tennis Club Jug (MKD)	Kenya	NP	Not played

== See also ==
- Billie Jean King Cup
