= 2022 Billie Jean King Cup Europe/Africa Zone Group III – Pool D (Skopje) =

Subsection of tennis competition

Pool D (Skopje) of the 2022 Billie Jean King Cup Europe/Africa Zone Group III was one of four pools in the Europe/Africa zone of the 2022 Billie Jean King Cup. Four teams competed in a round robin competition, with each team proceeding to their respective sections of the play-offs: the top team played for advancement to Group II in 2023.

== Standings ==
		KOS	ALB	KEN	NAM	RR; W–L	Set; W–L	Game; W–L	Standings
4	Kosovo		2–1	3–0	3–0	3–0	17–2 (89%)	108–33 (77%)	1
9	Albania	1–2		2–1	3–0	2–1	12–7 (63%)	94–59 (61%)	2
10	Kenya	0–3	1–2		3–0	1–2	8–10 (44%)	66–68 (49%)	3
8	Namibia	0–3	0–3	0–3		0–3	0–18 (0%)	0–108 (0%)	4

Standings are determined by: 1. number of wins; 2. number of matches; 3. in two-team ties, head-to-head records; 4. in three-team ties, (a) percentage of matches won (head-to-head records if two teams remain tied), then (b) percentage of sets won (head-to-head records if two teams remain tied), then (c) percentage of games won (head-to-head records if two teams remain tied), then (d) Billie Jean King Cup rankings.

== Round-robin ==
=== Kosovo vs. Kenya ===
Kosovo
3
Tennis Club Jug, Skopje, North Macedonia
5 July 2022
Clay

Kenya
0

			1	2	3
1	(Kosovo) (Kenya)	Donika Bashota; Cynthia Wanjala	6; 1	6; 4
2	(Kosovo) (Kenya)	Adrijana Lekaj; Alicia Owegi	6; 0	6; 1
3	(Kosovo) (Kenya)	Donika Bashota / Adrijana Lekaj; Roselida Asumwa / Alicia Owegi	6; 1	6; 0

=== Namibia vs. Albania ===
Namibia
0
Tennis Club Jug, Skopje, North Macedonia
5 July 2022
Clay

Albania
3

			1	2	3
1	(Namibia) (Albania)	N/A; N/A				w/o
2	(Namibia) (Albania)	N/A; N/A				w/o
3	(Namibia) (Albania)	N/A / N/A; N/A / N/A				w/o

=== Kosovo vs. Albania ===
Kosovo
2
Tennis Club Jug, Skopje, North Macedonia
6 July 2022
Clay

Albania
1

			1	2	3
1	(Kosovo) (Albania)	Vesa Gjinaj; Kristal Dule	6; 1	6; 4
2	(Kosovo) (Albania)	Adrijana Lekaj; Gresi Bajri	6; 2	7; 5
3	(Kosovo) (Albania)	Donika Bashota / Forta Morina; Kristal Dule / Rea Qinami	6; 2	4; 6	1; 6

=== Namibia vs. Kenya ===
Namibia
0
Tennis Club Jug, Skopje, North Macedonia
6 July 2022
Clay

Kenya
3

			1	2	3
1	(Namibia) (Kenya)	N/A; N/A				w/o
2	(Namibia) (Kenya)	N/A; N/A				w/o
3	(Namibia) (Kenya)	N/A / N/A; N/A / N/A				w/o

=== Kosovo vs. Namibia ===
Kosovo
3
Tennis Club Jug, Skopje, North Macedonia
7 July 2022
Clay

Namibia
0

			1	2	3
1	(Kosovo) (Namibia)	N/A; N/A				w/o
2	(Kosovo) (Namibia)	N/A; N/A				w/o
3	(Kosovo) (Namibia)	N/A / N/A; N/A / N/A				w/o

=== Kenya vs. Albania ===
Kenya
1
Tennis Club Jug, Skopje, North Macedonia
7 July 2022
Clay

Albania
2

			1	2	3
1	(Kenya) (Albania)	Cynthia Wanjala; Rea Qinami	7^{7} 6^{3}	6; 2
2	(Kenya) (Albania)	Alicia Owegi; Gresi Bajri	3; 6	0; 6
3	(Kenya) (Albania)	Roselida Asumwa / Alicia Owegi; Gresi Bajri / Kristal Dule	3; 6	4; 6
