= Mauritius Billie Jean King Cup team =

Mauritius
- Captain: Jean-Michel Giraud
- Nations Ranking: 108 (13 November 2023)
- First year: 2000
- Years played: 5
- Ties played (W–L): 22 (9–13)
- Best finish: Zonal Group III RR
- Most total wins: Marinne Giraud (9–6)
- Most singles wins: Marinne Giraud (6–2)
- Most doubles wins: Astrid Tixier (4–5)
- Best doubles team: Marinne Giraud / Astrid Tixier (2–3)
- Most ties played: Astrid Tixier (11)
- Most years played: Astrid Tixier (3)

The Mauritius Fed Cup team represents Mauritius in Fed Cup tennis competition and are governed by the Mauritius Tennis Federation. They have not competed since 2024.

== History ==
Mauritius competed in its first Fed Cup in 2000. Their best result was fourth place in their Group II pool in the same year, before 6 years of hiatus until 2007.

The team had yet another 14 year hiatus after 2008 until their return to the 2022 Billie Jean King Cup.

== Current team ==
Rankings as of November 6, 2023

Players representing Mauritius in 2023
Name	Born	First	Last		Ties	Win/Loss			Rankings	
Name	Born	First	Year	Tie	Ties	Sin	Dou	Tot	Sin	Dou
Tippi Dalle-Grave	February 25, 2005	2022	2023	Botswana	9	4–4	2-3	6-7	—N/a	—N/a
Tejaswini Jessoo	April 28, 2007	2023	2023	Seychelles	2	1-0	1-1	2-1	—N/a	—N/a
Zara Lennon	July 11, 2000	2022	2023	Botswana	9	4–4	1-3	5-7	—N/a	—N/a
Astrid Tixier	January 20, 1986	2007	2023	Zimbabwe	11	4–6	4-5	8-11	—N/a	—N/a

== See also ==
- Billie Jean King Cup
- Mauritius Davis Cup team
