= Burundi Billie Jean King Cup team =

Burundian women's tennis team

Burundi
- First year: 2022
- Years played: 1
- Ties played (W–L): 3 (1–2)
- Best finish: Zonal Group III RR
- Most total wins: Sada Nahimana (2–3)
- Most singles wins: Sada Nahimana (2–1)
- Most ties played: Sada Nahimana, Laura Syori (3)
- Most years played: Sada Nahimana (1); Laura Syori (1)

The Burundi Billie Jean King Cup team represents Burundi in Billie Jean King Cup tennis competition and are governed by the Fédération de Tennis du Burundi. They currently compete in the Europe/Africa Zone of Group III.

== History ==
Burundi competed in its first Billie Jean King Cup in 2022. Their best result was finishing third in their Group III pool in 2022.

== Players ==
Player	W-L (Total)	W-L (Singles)	W-L (Doubles)	Ties	Debut	Ref
Sada Nahimana	2–3	2–1	0–2	3	2022	
Laura Syori	1–4	1–2	0–2	3	2022	

== Recent performances ==
Here is the list of all match-ups of the Burundi participation in the Billie Jean King Cup in 2022.

Year	Competition	Date	Surface	Venue	Opponent	Score	Result
2022	Europe/Africa Zone Group III, Pool B	5 July	Clay	Tennis Club Jug (MKD)	Malta	1–2	Loss
2022	Europe/Africa Zone Group III, Pool B	6 July	Clay	Tennis Club Jug (MKD)	Portugal	0–3	Loss
2022	Europe/Africa Zone Group III, Semifinals	8 July	Clay	Tennis Club Jug (MKD)	Seychelles	2–0	Win
2022	Europe/Africa Zone Group III, 9th place play-off	9 July	Clay	Tennis Club Jug (MKD)	Botswana	NP	Not played

== See also ==
- Billie Jean King Cup
- Burundi Davis Cup team
