= 2022 Billie Jean King Cup Europe/Africa Zone Group III – Pool B (Skopje) =

Subsection of tennis competition

Pool B (Skopje) of the 2022 Billie Jean King Cup Europe/Africa Zone Group III was one of four pools in the Europe/Africa zone of the 2022 Billie Jean King Cup. Three teams competed in a round robin competition, with each team proceeding to their respective sections of the play-offs: the top team played for advancement to Group II in 2023.

== Standings ==
| | | POR | MLT | BDI | RR; W–L | Set; W–L | Game; W–L | Standings |
| 5 | Portugal | | 2–1 | 3–0 | 2–0 | 10–3 (77%) | 68–46 (60%) | 1 |
| 2 | Malta | 1–2 | | 2–1 | 1–1 | 7–7 (50%) | 65–62 (49%) | 2 |
| – | Burundi | 1–2 | 0–3 | | 0–1 | 4–11 (27%) | 53–78 (40%) | 3 |

Standings are determined by: 1. number of wins; 2. number of matches; 3. in two-team ties, head-to-head records; 4. in three-team ties, (a) percentage of matches won (head-to-head records if two teams remain tied), then (b) percentage of sets won (head-to-head records if two teams remain tied), then (c) percentage of games won (head-to-head records if two teams remain tied), then (d) Billie Jean King Cup rankings.

== Round-robin ==
=== Malta vs. Burundi ===
Malta
2
Tennis Club Jug, Skopje, North Macedonia
5–6 July 2022
Clay

Burundi
1

| | | | 1 | 2 | 3 |
|---|---|---|---|---|---|
| 1 | (Malta) (Burundi) | Elaine Genovese; Laura Syori | 6; 1 | 6; 3 |
| 2 | (Malta) (Burundi) | Francesca Curmi; Sada Nahimana | 4; 6 | 6; 3 | 2; 6 |
| 3 | (Malta) (Burundi) | Francesca Curmi / Elaine Genovese; Sada Nahimana / Laura Syori | 5; 7 | 6; 4 | 6; 1 |

=== Portugal vs. Burundi ===
Portugal
3
Tennis Club Jug, Skopje, North Macedonia
6 July 2022
Clay

Burundi
0

| | | | 1 | 2 | 3 |
|---|---|---|---|---|---|
| 1 | (Portugal) (Burundi) | Matilde Jorge; Laura Syori | 6; 0 | 6; 2 |
| 2 | (Portugal) (Burundi) | Francisca Jorge; Sada Nahimana | 7; 5 | 0; 6 | 6; 4 |
| 3 | (Portugal) (Burundi) | Matilde Jorge / Inês Murta; Sada Nahimana / Laura Syori | 6; 3 | 6; 2 |

=== Malta vs. Portugal ===
Malta
1
Tennis Club Jug, Skopje, North Macedonia
7 July 2022
Clay

Portugal
2

| | | | 1 | 2 | 3 |
|---|---|---|---|---|---|
| 1 | (Malta) (Portugal) | Elaine Genovese; Matilde Jorge | 3; 6 | 4; 6 |
| 2 | (Malta) (Portugal) | Francesca Curmi; Francisca Jorge | 4; 6 | 1; 6 |
| 3 | (Malta) (Portugal) | Elaine Genovese / Helene Pellicano; Inês Murta / Ana Filipa Santos | 6; 3 | 6; 4 |
