= San Marino Billie Jean King Cup team =

- First year: 1997

The San Marino Billie Jean King Cup team represents San Marino in the Billie Jean King Cup tennis competition and are governed by the San Marino Tennis Federation. They have not competed since 1997.

== History ==
San Marino competed in its first (and thus far, only) Fed Cup in 1997, winning one tie to finish fifth in its Group II pool.

== See also ==
- Billie Jean King Cup
- San Marino Davis Cup team
