= Nigeria Billie Jean King Cup team =

National female tennis team of Nigeria

Nigeria
- Colors: green & white
- First year: 2021
- Years played: 1
- Ties played (W–L): 4 (2–2)
- Best finish: Zonal Group III RR
- Most total wins: Oyinlomo Quadre (4–3)
- Most singles wins: Oyinlomo Quadre (2–2)
- Most ties played: Adesuwa Osabuohien, Oyinlomo Quadre (4)

The Nigeria Billie Jean King Cup team represents Nigeria in Billie Jean King Cup tennis competition and are governed by the Nigeria Tennis Federation. They currently compete in the Europe/Africa Zone of Group III.

== History ==
Nigeria competed in its first Billie Jean King Cup in 2021. Their best result was finishing second in their Group III pool in 2021.

== Team (2021) ==
- Sarah Adegoke
- Adesuwa Osabuohien
- Oyinlomo Quadre

== See also ==
- Billie Jean King Cup
- Nigeria Davis Cup team
