= Uganda Billie Jean King Cup team =

National tennis team

Uganda
- Nations Ranking: NR (12 February 2018)
- First year: 2018
- Years played: 0
- Ties played (W–L): 0 (0–0)

The Uganda Fed Cup team represents Uganda in Fed Cup tennis competition and are governed by the Uganda Tennis Association. They will take part in the Fed Cup for the first time in 2018, competing in the Europe/Africa Zone Group III.

== Current team ==
Most recent year-end rankings are used.

Name	Born	First	Last		Ties	Win/Loss			Ranks	
Name	Born	First	Year	Tie	Ties	Sin	Dou	Tot	Sin	Dou
Sandra Khissa										
Winnie Birungi										
Daphine Namulinde Mukasa										
Patience Athieno										

== History ==
Uganda will compete in its first Fed Cup in 2018.

== Players ==
Year	Team			
2018	Sandra Khissa	Winnie Birungi	Daphine Namulinde Mukasa	Patience Athieno

== See also ==
- Davis Cup
- Uganda Davis Cup team
