= Azerbaijan Billie Jean King Cup team =

Azerbaijani women's tennis team

Azerbaijan
- ITF ranking: NR
- First year: 2006
- Years played: 2
- Ties played (W–L): 9 (1–8)
- Best finish: Zonal Group III
- Most total wins: Umayra Hashimova
- Most singles wins: Umayra Hashimova (6-2)
- Most doubles wins: Umayra Hashimova (3-0) / Sayyara Mammadova (0–1) / Shukufa Abdullayeva (0–1)
- Most ties played: Sevil Aliyeva (8)
- Most years played: Sevil Aliyeva (2)

The Azerbaijan Billie Jean King Cup team represents Azerbaijan in Billie Jean King Cup tennis competition and are governed by the Azerbaijan Tennis Federation. They have not competed since 2007.

== History ==
Azerbaijan competed in its first Fed Cup in 2006. Their best result was fifth place in Group III in 2006 and 2007.

== Players ==
Name	Years	First	Ties	Win/Loss		
Name	Years	First	Ties	Singles	Doubles	Total
Shukufa Abdullayeva	1	2007	2	0–2	0–1	0–3
Sevil Aliyeva	2	2006	9	1–7	0–3	1–10
Alina Gavrish	1	2021	4	2–1	0–1	2–2
Alina Guseynova	1	2021	3	0–0	1–2	1–2
Elina Gasanova	1	2006	5	2–3	0–1	2–4
Umayra Hashimova	1	2021	5	3–2	3–0	6–2
Sayyara Mammadova	1	2007	2	0–2	0–1	0–3
Zuleykha Safarova	1	2021	4	0–2	2–1	2–3

== See also ==
- Billie Jean King Cup
- Azerbaijan Davis Cup team
