= Ghana Billie Jean King Cup team =

Ghanaian women's tennis team

Ghana
- First year: 2021
- Years played: 1
- Ties played (W–L): 4 (0–4)
- Best finish: Zonal Group III RR
- Most total wins: Nyanyuie Grace Tomegah (2–4)
- Most singles wins: Nyanyuie Grace Tomegah (2–1)
- Most ties played: Nyanyuie Grace Tomegah, Naa Anyema Mckorley, Naa Shika Mckorley (4)

The Ghana Billie Jean King Cup team represents Ghana in Billie Jean King Cup tennis competition and are governed by the Ghana Tennis Federation. They currently compete in the Europe/Africa Zone of Group III.

== History ==
Ghana competed in its first Billie Jean King Cup in 2021. Their best result was finishing fourth in their Group III pool in 2021.

== Team (2021) ==
- Annette Cruickshank
- Naa Anyema Mckorley
- Naa Shika Mckorley
- Nyanyuie Grace Tomegah

== See also ==
- Billie Jean King Cup
- Ghana Davis Cup team
