= Botswana Billie Jean King Cup team =

Motswana women's tennis team

Botswana
- ITF ranking: NR
- First year: 1995
- Years played: 12
- Ties played (W–L): 49 (6–43)
- Best finish: Zonal Group II
- Most total wins: Tapiwa Marobela (8–16)
- Most singles wins: Tapiwa Marobela (6–7)
- Most doubles wins: Kelesitse Makgale (3–15)
- Best doubles team: Kelesitse Makgale / Gaobolae Seleka (2–3)
- Most ties played: Kelesitse Makgale (25)
- Most years played: Kelesitse Makgale (6)

The Botswana Billie Jean King Cup team represents Botswana in Billie Jean King Cup tennis competition and are governed by the Botswana Tennis Association. They have not competed since 2006.

== History ==
Botswana competed in its first Fed Cup in 1995. Their best result was fourth place in its Group II pool in 2002 and 2003.

Tapiwa Marobela has recorded the highest number of wins for the Botswana Fed Cup team, six wins from 13 singles matches and two wins from 11 doubles matches between 2001 and 2004, before she attended Florida State University from 2004 to 2008.

== See also ==
- Billie Jean King Cup
- Botswana Davis Cup team
- Botswana Tennis Association
