= Iceland Billie Jean King Cup team =

Icelandic women's tennis team

Iceland
- Captain: Iris Staub
- Nations Ranking: 99 (16 November 2015)
- Colors: blue & white
- First year: 1996
- Years played: 11
- Ties played (W–L): 45 (1–44)
- Best finish: Zonal Group II RR
- Most total wins: Sofia Sóley Jónasdóttir (5–6)
- Most singles wins: Sofia Sóley Jónasdóttir (2–4)
- Most doubles wins: Sofia Sóley Jónasdóttir (3–2)/ Anna Soffía Grönholm (3–11)
- Best doubles team: Sofia Sóley Jónasdóttir / Anna Soffía Grönholm (2-1)
- Most ties played: Iris Staub (21)
- Most years played: Iris Staub (7)

The Iceland Billie Jean King Cup team represents Iceland in Billie Jean King Cup tennis competition and are governed by the Icelandic Tennis Association. They currently compete in the Europe/Africa Zone of Group III. In June 2026, Iceland was represented by Anna Soffia Gronholm, Eyglo Dis Armanndottir-Sofia, Soley Jonasdottir and Bryndis Rosa.Gronholm lost 6-2 6–1 to Moldova's Lia Belibova. Gronhom has been playing since 2014 and has a record of 16-63. She plays both singles and doubles for Iceland. Rosa lost 6-3 6–0 to Moldova's Abigail Rencheli. Iceland also lost in doubles 6-4 6-0. This was the 7th consecutive victory for Moldova against Icleand.

== History ==
Iceland competed in its first Fed Cup in 1996. They won their only tie to date in 2008, defeating Zimbabwe in Europe/Africa Zone Group II Round Robin play. Prior to 2008, Iceland had only won one rubber, against Cameroon in 1997.

== Players ==
Name	Years	First	Ties	Win/Loss		
Name	Years	First	Ties	Singles	Doubles	Total
Margarita Akbacheva	1	1999	2	0–1	0–1	0–2
Hera Brynjarsdóttir	4	2014	12	1–7	1–10	2–17
Ingunn Eiríksdóttir	1	1999	2	0–0	0–2	0–2
Anna Soffía Grönholm	6	2014	21	2–18	3–14	5–32
Hjördís Rósa Guðmundsdóttir	2	2014	6	1–5	0–3	1–8
Kristín Gunnarsdóttir	1	1996	1	0–0	0–1	0–1
Hrafuhildur Hannesdóttir	1	1996	4	0–4	0–3	0–7
Soumia Islami	1	2008	2	1–1	0–0	1–1
Arney Jóhannesdóttir	1	2009	1	0–0	0–1	0–1
Sofia Sóley Jónasdóttir	2	2017	6	2–4	3–2	5–6
Júlíana Jónsdóttir	1	1997	2	0–1	0–1	0–2
Sandra Kristjánsdóttir	4	2005	11	0–8	1–9	1–17
Stella Kristjánsdóttir	2	1998	8	0–2	0–6	0–8
Selma Óskarsdóttir	2	2017	2	0–0	1–0	1–0
Rakel Petursdóttir	2	1998	8	0–8	0–3	0–11
Rebekka Pétursdóttir	2	2005	5	0–4	0–4	0–8
Eirdís Ragnarsdóttir	1	2009	5	0–5	0–4	0–9
Sigurlaug Sigurðardóttir	3	2000	10	0–10	0–7	0–17
Iris Staub	8	1996	25	1–19	2–12	3–31
Stefanía Stefánsdóttir	4	1996	18	0–16	1–15	1–31

== See also ==
- Billie Jean King Cup
- Iceland Davis Cup team
