= 2020–21 Billie Jean King Cup Europe/Africa Zone =

Subsection of tennis competition

The Europe/Africa Zone is one of three zones of regional competition in the 2020–21 Billie Jean King Cup.

== Group I ==
- Venue 1: Tallink Tennis Center, Tallinn, Estonia (indoor hard)
- Venue 2: Centre National de Tennis, Esch-sur-Alzette, Luxembourg (indoor hard)
- Date: 5–8 February 2020

The thirteen teams were split across the two venues, with 7 teams competing in Tallinn and the other 6 competing in Esch-sur-Alzette. In Tallinn, the seven teams were split into two Pools of three and four teams with the teams finishing 1st and 2nd place in the pool competing in promotional playoffs for advancement to the play-offs. In Esch-sur-Alzette, the nations were split into two pools of 3 teams, with the nations finishing first and second competing in promotional playoffs for advancement to the play-offs. The nations finishing last in each of the pools competed in relegation playoffs, with one nation from each venue relegated to Group II in 2022.

=== Seeding ===
| Pot | Nation | Rank^{1} | Seed |
|---|---|---|---|
| 1 | Serbia | 21 | 1 |
| 1 | Ukraine | 23 | 2 |
| 1 | Italy | 24 | 3 |
| 1 | Poland | 26 | 4 |
| 2 | Croatia | 28 | 5 |
| 2 | Sweden | 29 | 6 |
| 2 | Estonia | 38 | 7 |
| 2 | Turkey | 39 | 8 |
| 3 | Austria | 40 | 9 |
| 3 | Bulgaria | 42 | 10 |
| 3 | Luxembourg | 44 | 11 |
| 3 | Greece | 45 | 12 |
| 3 | Slovenia | 49 | 13 |

- ^{1}Billie Jean King Cup Rankings as of 11 November 2019

=== Pools ===
| | Pool A (Tallinn) | UKR | CRO | BUL |
| 1 | Ukraine (2–0) | | 3–0 | 3–0 |
| 2 | Croatia (1–1) | 0–3 | | 2–1 |
| 3 | Bulgaria (0–2) | 0–3 | 1–2 | |

| | Pool B (Tallinn) | ITA | EST | AUT | GRE |
| 1 | Italy (3–0) | | 2–1 | 3–0 | 3–0 |
| 2 | Estonia (1–2) | 1–2 | | 2–1 | 1–2 |
| 3 | Austria (1–2) | 0–3 | 1–2 | | 2–1 |
| 4 | Greece (1–2) | 0–3 | 2–1 | 1–2 | |

| | Pool A (Esch-sur-Alzette) | SRB | SWE | LUX |
| 1 | Serbia (2–0) | | 2–1 | 2–1 |
| 2 | Sweden (1–1) | 1–2 | | 2–1 |
| 3 | Luxembourg (0–2) | 1–2 | 1–2 | |

| | Pool B (Esch-sur-Alzette) | POL | SLO | TUR |
| 1 | Poland (2–0) | | 2–1 | 3–0 |
| 2 | Slovenia (1–1) | 1–2 | | 2–1 |
| 3 | Turkey (0–2) | 0–3 | 1–2 | |

=== Play-offs ===
| Placing (Tallinn) | A Team | Score | B Team |
|---|---|---|---|
| Promotional | Ukraine | 2–1 | Estonia |
| Promotional | Croatia | 0–2 | Italy |
| 9th | —N/a | | Austria |
| Relegation | Bulgaria | 2–0 | Greece |

| Placing (Esch-sur-Alzette) | A Team | Score | B Team |
|---|---|---|---|
| Promotional | Serbia | 2–1 | Slovenia |
| Promotional | Sweden | 0–2 | Poland |
| 9th | —N/a | | |
| Relegation | Luxembourg | 0–2 | Turkey |

=== Final placements ===
| Placing | Teams | | | |
| Promoted/First | Ukraine | Italy | Serbia | Poland |
| Fifth | Estonia | Croatia | Slovenia | Sweden |
| Ninth | Austria | | | |
| Tenth | Bulgaria | | Turkey | |
| Twelfth/Relegated | Greece | | Luxembourg | |

- Ukraine, Italy, Serbia and Poland were promoted to the 2020 Billie Jean King Cup play-offs.
- Greece and Luxembourg were relegated to Europe/Africa Zone Group II in 2022.

== Group II ==
- Venue: Tali Tennis Center, Helsinki, Finland (indoor hard)
- Dates: 4–7 February 2020

The eight teams are split into two pools of 4. The 1st and 2nd placed teams of each pool will play-off to determine the nation advancing to Group I in 2022. The third and fourth placed teams will play-off to determine the nations relegated to Group III in 2022.

=== Seeding ===
| Pot | Nation | Rank^{1} | Seed |
|---|---|---|---|
| 1 | Israel | 52 | 1 |
| 1 | Denmark | 55 | 2 |
| 2 | Tunisia | 61 | 3 |
| 2 | Portugal | 62 | 4 |
| 3 | Georgia | 64 | 5 |
| 3 | Finland | 65 | 6 |
| 4 | Egypt | 67 | 7 |
| 4 | Moldova | 88 | 8 |

- ^{1}Billie Jean King Cup Rankings as of 11 November 2019

=== Pools ===
| | Pool A | GEO | TUN | ISR | MDA |
| 1 | Georgia (3–0) | | 2–1 | 2–1 | 3–0 |
| 2 | Tunisia (2–1) | 1–2 | | 2–1 | 3–0 |
| 3 | Israel (1–2) | 1–2 | 1–2 | | 3–0 |
| 4 | Moldova (0–3) | 0–3 | 0–3 | 0–3 | |

| | Pool B | DEN | FIN | EGY | POR |
| 1 | Denmark (2–1) | | 2–1 | 1–2 | 3–0 |
| 2 | Finland (2–1) | 1–2 | | 3–0 | 2–1 |
| 3 | Egypt (2–1) | 2–1 | 0–3 | | 2–1 |
| 4 | Portugal (0–3) | 0–3 | 1–2 | 1–2 | |

=== Play-offs ===
| Placing | A Team | Score | B Team |
|---|---|---|---|
| Promotional | Georgia | 2–1 | Finland |
| Promotional | Tunisia | 1–2 | Denmark |
| Relegation | Israel | 2–0 | Portugal |
| Relegation | Moldova | 0–2 | Egypt |

=== Final placements ===
| Placing | Teams | |
| Promoted/First | Georgia | Denmark |
| Third | Finland | Tunisia |
| Fifth | Israel | Egypt |
| Relegated/Seventh | Portugal | Moldova |

- Georgia and Denmark were promoted to Europe/Africa Zone Group I in 2022.
- Portugal and Moldova were relegated to Europe/Africa Zone Group III in 2022.

== Group III ==
- Venue: SEB Arena, Vilnius, Lithuania (indoor hard)
- Dates: 15–19 June 2021

The 21 teams are split into three pools of 4 teams and three pools of 3 teams. The 1st placed teams of each pool will play-off to determine the two nations advancing to Group II in 2022.

=== Seeding ===
| Pot | Nation | Rank^{1} | Seed |
|---|---|---|---|
| 1 | Norway | 73 | 1 |
| 1 | Cyprus | 76 | 2 |
| 1 | Lithuania | 77 | 3 |
| 1 | Ireland | 81 | 4 |
| 1 | Malta | 82 | 5 |
| 1 | South Africa | 83 | 6 |
| 2 | Kosovo | 86 | 7 |
| 2 | Algeria | 87 | 8 |
| 2 | North Macedonia | 88 | 9 |
| 2 | Armenia | 89 | 10 |
| 2 | Montenegro | 90 | 11 |
| 2 | Bosnia and Herzegovina | 93 | 12 |
| 3 | Kenya | 96 | 13 |
| 3 | Iceland | 97 | 14 |
| 3 | Albania | NR | – |
| 3 | Azerbaijan | NR | – |
| 3 | Ghana | NR | – |
| 3 | Namibia | NR | – |
| 3 | Nigeria | NR | – |
| 3 | Rwanda | NR | – |
| 3 | Zimbabwe | NR | – |

- ^{1}Billie Jean King Cup Rankings as of 19 April 2021

=== Pools ===
| | Pool A | NOR | MKD | ALB |
| 1 | Norway (2–0) | | 3–0 | 3–0 |
| 2 | North Macedonia (1–1) | 0–3 | | 2–1 |
| 3 | Albania (0–2) | 0–3 | 1–2 | |

| | Pool B | BIH | CYP | RWA |
| 1 | Bosnia and Herzegovina (2–0) | | 2–1 | 3–0 |
| 2 | Cyprus (1–1) | 1–2 | | 3–0 |
| 3 | Rwanda (0–2) | 0–3 | 0–3 | |

| | Pool C | LTU | NGR | KOS |
| 1 | Lithuania (2–0) | | 3–0 | 3–0 |
| 2 | Nigeria (1–1) | 0–3 | | 3–0 |
| 3 | Kosovo (0–2) | 0–3 | 0–3 | |

| | Pool D | IRL | ARM | ISL | GHA |
| 1 | Ireland (3–0) | | 3–0 | 3–0 | 3–0 |
| 2 | Armenia (2–1) | 0–3 | | 3–0 | 3–0 |
| 3 | Iceland (1–2) | 0–3 | 0–3 | | 2–1 |
| 4 | Ghana (0–3) | 0–3 | 0–3 | 1–2 | |

| | Pool E | MLT | ALG | ZIM | KEN |
| 1 | Malta (3–0) | | 3–0 | 2–1 | 3–0 |
| 2 | Algeria (2–1) | 0–3 | | 2–1 | 3–0 |
| 3 | Zimbabwe (1–2) | 1–2 | 1–2 | | 3–0 |
| 4 | Kenya (0–3) | 0–3 | 0–3 | 0–3 | |

| | Pool F | RSA | MNE | AZE | NAM |
| 1 | South Africa (3–0) | | 3–0 | 3–0 | 3–0 |
| 2 | Montenegro (2–1) | 0–3 | | 3–0 | 2–1 |
| 3 | Azerbaijan (1–2) | 0–3 | 0–3 | | 3–0 |
| 4 | Namibia (0–3) | 0–3 | 1–2 | 0–3 | |

=== Play-offs ===
==== Promotional play-offs ====
Semifinals; 18 June 2021
A | Norway
Bye
D | Ireland | 0
B | Bosnia and H. | 3
F | South Africa | 0
E | Malta | 3
Bye
C | Lithuania

Promotional play-off 19 June 2021
A | Norway | 2
B | Bosnia and H. | 0
E | Malta | 0
C | Lithuania | 2

==== 5th-place play-off ====
| 5th-place play-off 19 June 2021 |
| D | Ireland | 2 |
| F | South Africa | 1 |

==== 7th-12th-place play-offs ====
Semifinals; 18 June 2021
B | Cyprus
Bye
D | Armenia | 1
C | Nigeria | 2
F | Montenegro | 2
A | North Macedonia | 0
Bye
E | Algeria

7th-place play-off 19 June 2021
B | Cyprus | 2
C | Nigeria | 0
F | Montenegro | 2
E | Algeria | 1

==== 11th-place play-off ====
| 11th-place play-off 19 June 2021 |
| D | Armenia | 2 |
| A | North Macedonia | 1 |

==== 13th-18th-place play-offs ====
Semifinals; 18 June 2021
C | Kosovo
Bye
E | Zimbabwe | 3
B | Rwanda | 0
A | Albania | 1
F | Azerbaijan | 2
Bye
D | Iceland

13th-place play-off 19 June 2021
C | Kosovo | 2
E | Zimbabwe | 1
F | Azerbaijan | 3
D | Iceland | 0

==== 17th-place play-off ====
| 17th-place play-off 19 June 2021 |
| B | Rwanda | 0 |
| A | Albania | 3 |

==== 19th-21st-place play-offs ====
| Semifinals; 18 June 2021 | | | 19th-place play-off 19 June 2021 |
| | | | E | Kenya | 1 |
| | | | F | Namibia | 2 |
| D | Ghana | 1 | F | Namibia | 2 |
| F | Namibia | 2 |

=== Final placements ===
| Placing | Teams | |
| Promoted/First | Norway | Lithuania |
| Third | Bosnia and Herzegovina | Malta |
| Fifth | Ireland | |
| Sixth | South Africa | |
| Seventh | Cyprus | Montenegro |
| Ninth | Nigeria | Algeria |
| Eleventh | Armenia | |
| Twelfth | North Macedonia | |
| Thirteenth | Kosovo | Azerbaijan |
| Fifteenth | Zimbabwe | Iceland |
| Seventeenth | Albania | |
| Eighteenth | Rwanda | |
| Nineteenth | Namibia | |
| Twentieth | Kenya | |
| Twenty-first | Ghana | |

- Norway and Lithuania were promoted to Europe/Africa Zone Group II in 2022.
