= 2020–21 Billie Jean King Cup Americas Zone =

Subsection of tennis competition

The Americas Zone is one of three zones of regional competition in the 2020–21 Billie Jean King Cup.

== Group I ==
- Venue: Club Palestino, Santiago, Chile (clay)
- Date: 5–8 February 2020

The seven teams were divided into two pools of three and four teams. The two pool winners took part in a play-off to determine the nation advancing to the play-offs. The nations finishing last (in Pool A) and second last (in Pool B) took part in a relegation play-off, with the losing nation relegated to Group II for 2022. The nation finishing last in Pool B was automatically relegated to Group II for 2022.

=== Seeding ===
| Pot | Nation | Rank^{1} | Seed |
|---|---|---|---|
| 1 | Paraguay | 20 | 1 |
| 1 | Argentina | 25 | 2 |
| 2 | Chile | 31 | 3 |
| 2 | Colombia | 32 | 4 |
| 3 | Mexico | 33 | 5 |
| 3 | Venezuela | 41 | 6 |
| 3 | Peru | 43 | 7 |

- ^{1}Billie Jean King Cup Rankings as of 11 November 2019

=== Pools ===
| | Pool A | PAR | COL | VEN |
| 1 | Paraguay (2–0) | | 2–1 | 3–0 |
| 2 | Colombia (1–1) | 1–2 | | 3–0 |
| 3 | Venezuela (0–2) | 0–3 | 0–3 | |

| | Pool B | ARG | MEX | CHI | PER |
| 1 | Argentina (3–0) | | 2–1 | 2–1 | 3–0 |
| 2 | Mexico (2–1) | 1–2 | | 2–1 | 3–0 |
| 3 | Chile (1–2) | 1–2 | 1–2 | | 3–0 |
| 4 | Peru (0–3) | 0–3 | 0–3 | 0–3 | |

=== Play-offs ===
| Placing | A Team | Score | B Team |
|---|---|---|---|
| Promotional | Paraguay | 1–2 | Mexico |
| Promotional | Colombia | 0–2 | Argentina |
| Relegation | Venezuela | 1–2 | Chile |
| Relegation | —N/a | | Peru |

=== Final placements ===
| Placing | Teams | |
| Promoted/First | Argentina | Mexico |
| Third | Colombia | Paraguay |
| Fifth | Chile | |
| Sixth/Relegated | Venezuela | |
| Seventh/Relegated | Peru | |

- Argentina and Mexico were promoted to the 2020 Billie Jean King Cup play-offs.
- Peru and Venezuela were relegated to Americas Zone Group II in 2022.

== Group II ==
- Venue 1: Centro de Alto Rendimiento Fred Maduro, Panama City, Panama (clay)
- Venue 2: Club de Tenis La Paz, La Paz, Bolivia (clay)
- Dates: 23–26 June 2021 (Panama City) and 27–30 October 2021 (La Paz)

The fourteen teams will compete across two different venues, with 7 nations taking part in La Paz, and 7 nations taking part in Panama City. In La Paz, the seven teams were divided into two pools of three and four teams. The winners of each pool will play-off to determine the nation advancing to Group I in 2022. In Panama City, the seven teams were divided into two pools of four and three teams, with the winning nation promoted to Group I in 2022.

=== Seeding ===
Panama City

| Pot | Nation | Rank^{1} | Seed |
|---|---|---|---|
| 1 | Bahamas | 55 | 1 |
| 1 | Ecuador | 62 | 2 |
| 2 | Cuba | 66 | 3 |
| 2 | Uruguay | 69 | 4 |
| 3 | Costa Rica | 70 | 5 |
| 3 | Panama | 74 | 6 |
| 3 | El Salvador | 98 | 7 |

- ^{1}Billie Jean King Cup Rankings as of 19 April 2021

La Paz

| Pot | Nation | Rank^{1} | Seed |
|---|---|---|---|
| 1 | Guatemala | 61 | 1 |
| 1 | Bolivia | 64 | 2 |
| 2 | Dominican Republic | 67 | 3 |
| 2 | Puerto Rico | 80 | 4 |
| 3 | Honduras | 85 | 5 |
| 3 | Jamaica | 98 | 6 |
| 3 | Barbados | 103 | 7 |

- ^{1}Billie Jean King Cup Rankings as of 19 April 2021

=== Pools ===
| | Pool A (Panama City) | URU | BAH | CRC |
| 1 | Uruguay (2–0) | | 2–1 | 2–1 |
| 2 | Bahamas (1–1) | 1–2 | | 2–1 |
| 3 | Costa Rica (0–2) | 1–2 | 1–2 | |

| | Pool B (Panama City) | ECU | ESA | CUB | PAN |
| 1 | Ecuador (3–0) | | 3–0 | 3–0 | 3–0 |
| 2 | El Salvador (2–1) | 0–3 | | 2–1 | 2–1 |
| 3 | Cuba (1–2) | 0–3 | 1–2 | | 2–1 |
| 4 | Panama (0–3) | 0–3 | 1–2 | 1–2 | |

| | Pool A (La Paz) | GUA | DOM | JAM |
| 1 | Guatemala (2–0) | | 3–0 | 3–0 |
| 2 | Dominican Republic (1–1) | 0–3 | | 3–0 |
| 3 | Jamaica (0–2) | 0–3 | 0–3 | |

| | Pool B (La Paz) | BOL | HON | PUR | BAR |
| 1 | Bolivia (3–0) | | 3–0 | 3–0 | 3–0 |
| 2 | Honduras (2–1) | 0–3 | | 2–1 | 3–0 |
| 3 | Puerto Rico (1–2) | 0–3 | 1–2 | | 3–0 |
| 4 | Barbados (0–3) | 0–3 | 0–3 | 0–3 | |

=== Play-offs ===
| Placing (Panama City) | A Team | Score | B Team |
|---|---|---|---|
| Promotional | Uruguay | 0–2 | Ecuador |
| 3rd–4th | Bahamas | 2–0 | El Salvador |
| 5th–6th | Costa Rica | 2–0 | Cuba |
| 7th | —N/a | | Panama |

| Placing (La Paz) | A Team | Score | B Team |
|---|---|---|---|
| Promotional | Guatemala | 2–0 | Bolivia |
| 3rd–4th | Dominican Republic | 2–1 | Honduras |
| 5th–6th | Jamaica | 0–3 | Puerto Rico |
| 7th | —N/a | | Barbados |

=== Final placements ===
| Placing | Teams | |
| Promoted/First | Ecuador | Guatemala |
| Second | Uruguay | Bolivia |
| Third | Bahamas | Dominican Republic |
| Fourth | El Salvador | Honduras |
| Fifth | Costa Rica | Puerto Rico |
| Sixth | Cuba | Jamaica |
| Seventh | Panama | Barbados |

- Ecuador and Guatemala were promoted to Americas Zone Group I in 2022.
