= 2021 Billie Jean King Cup Europe/Africa Zone Group III – play-offs =

Subsection of tennis competition

The play-offs of the 2021 Billie Jean King Cup Europe/Africa Zone Group III were the final stages of the Group III zonal competition involving teams from Europe and Africa. Using the positions determined in their pools, the twenty-one teams faced off to determine their placing in the 2021 Billie Jean King Cup Europe/Africa Zone Group III. The top two teams advanced to Billie Jean King Cup Europe/Africa Zone Group II.

Placing	Pool A	Pool B	Pool C	Pool D	Pool E	Pool F
1	Norway	Bosnia and Herzegovina	Lithuania	Ireland	Malta	South Africa
2	North Macedonia	Cyprus	Nigeria	Armenia	Algeria	Montenegro
3	Albania	Rwanda	Kosovo	Iceland	Zimbabwe	Azerbaijan
4	—N/a			Ghana	Kenya	Namibia

== 1st to 6th play-offs ==
The first placed teams of each pool were drawn in head-to-head rounds. The winners advanced to Group II in 2022.

=== Semifinals ===
==== Ireland vs. Bosnia and Herzegovina ====
Ireland
0
SEB Arena, Vilnius, Lithuania
18 June 2021
Hard (indoor)

Bosnia and Herzegovina
3

			1	2	3
1	(Republic of Ireland) (Bosnia and Herzegovina)	Celine Simunyu; Nefisa Berberović	2; 6	0; 6
2	(Republic of Ireland) (Bosnia and Herzegovina)	Anna Bowtell; Dea Herdželaš	3; 6	4; 6
3	(Republic of Ireland) (Bosnia and Herzegovina)	Sophia Derivan / Shauna Heffernan; Anita Husarić / Suana Tucaković	5; 7	1; 6

==== South Africa vs. Malta ====
South Africa
0
SEB Arena, Vilnius, Lithuania
18 June 2021
Hard (indoor)

Malta
3

			1	2	3
1	(South Africa) (Malta)	Delien Kleinhans; Francesca Curmi	1; 6	1; 6
2	(South Africa) (Malta)	Chanel Simmonds; Helene Pellicano	6; 0	2; 6	4; 6
3	(South Africa) (Malta)	Kelly Arends / Lara Van Der Merwe; Francesca Curmi / Elaine Genovese	4; 6	1; 6

=== Promotional play-offs ===
==== Norway vs. Bosnia and Herzegovina ====
Norway
2
SEB Arena, Vilnius, Lithuania
19 June 2021
Hard (indoor)

Bosnia and Herzegovina
0

			1	2	3
1	(Norway) (Bosnia and Herzegovina)	Malene Helgø; Nefisa Berberović	6; 0	6; 4
2	(Norway) (Bosnia and Herzegovina)	Ulrikke Eikeri; Dea Herdželaš	7; 5	6; 3
3	(Norway) (Bosnia and Herzegovina)	Ulrikke Eikeri / Malene Helgø; Anita Husarić / Suana Tucaković				not played

==== Malta vs. Lithuania ====
Malta
0
SEB Arena, Vilnius, Lithuania
19 June 2021
Hard (indoor)

Lithuania
2

			1	2	3
1	(Malta) (Lithuania)	Francesca Curmi; Akvilė Paražinskaitė	1; 6	4; 6
2	(Malta) (Lithuania)	Helene Pellicano; Justina Mikulskytė	2; 6	2; 6
3	(Malta) (Lithuania)	Francesca Curmi / Elaine Genovese; Justina Mikulskytė / Akvilė Paražinskaitė				not played

=== 5th place play-off ===
==== Ireland vs. South Africa ====
Ireland
2
SEB Arena, Vilnius, Lithuania
19 June 2021
Hard (indoor)

South Africa
1

			1	2	3
1	(Republic of Ireland) (South Africa)	Celine Simunyu; Lara Van Der Merwe	7^{7} 6^{2}	6; 4
2	(Republic of Ireland) (South Africa)	Anna Bowtell; Chanel Simmonds	2; 6	4; 6
3	(Republic of Ireland) (South Africa)	Sophia Derivan / Shauna Heffernan; Chanel Simmonds / Lara Van Der Merwe	6; 3	6; 4

== 7th to 12th play-offs ==
The second placed teams of each pool were drawn in head-to-head rounds to find the equal 7th placed teams.

=== Semifinals ===
==== Armenia vs. Nigeria ====
Armenia
1
SEB Arena, Vilnius, Lithuania
18 June 2021
Hard (indoor)

Nigeria
2

			1	2	3
1	(Armenia) (Nigeria)	Irena Muradyan; Adesuwa Osabuohien	6; 2	6; 4
2	(Armenia) (Nigeria)	Arevik Tumanyan; Oyinlomo Quadre	5; 7	3; 6
3	(Armenia) (Nigeria)	Gabriella Akopyan / Irena Muradyan; Adesuwa Osabuohien / Oyinlomo Quadre	2; 6	7^{7} 6^{4}	0; 6

==== Montenegro vs. North Macedonia ====
Montenegro
2
SEB Arena, Vilnius, Lithuania
18 June 2021
Hard (indoor)

North Macedonia
0

			1	2	3
1	(Montenegro) (North Macedonia)	Tea Nikčević; Jana Tanevska	6; 2	6; 4
2	(Montenegro) (North Macedonia)	Divna Ratković; Aleksandra Simeva	6; 2	1; 6	7; 5
3	(Montenegro) (North Macedonia)	Tea Nikčević / Divna Ratković; Katarina Marinkovikj / Aleksandra Simeva				not played

=== 7th place play-offs ===
==== Cyprus vs. Nigeria ====
Cyprus
2
SEB Arena, Vilnius, Lithuania
19 June 2021
Hard (indoor)

Nigeria
0

			1	2	3
1	(Cyprus) (Nigeria)	Maria Siopacha; Adesuwa Osabuohien	6; 1	7; 5
2	(Cyprus) (Nigeria)	Raluca Șerban; Oyinlomo Quadre	6; 1	6; 2
3	(Cyprus) (Nigeria)	Raluca Șerban / Maria Siopacha; Adesuwa Osabuohien / Oyinlomo Quadre				not played

==== Montenegro vs. Algeria ====
Montenegro
2
SEB Arena, Vilnius, Lithuania
19 June 2021
Hard (indoor)

Algeria
1

			1	2	3
1	(Montenegro) (Algeria)	Tea Nikčević; Inès Bekrar	3; 6	0; 6
2	(Montenegro) (Algeria)	Divna Ratković; Lynda Benkaddour	6; 4	3; 6	7; 5
3	(Montenegro) (Algeria)	Tea Nikčević / Divna Ratković; Lynda Benkaddour / Yassamine Boudjadi	6; 3	5; 7	6; 1

=== 11th place play-off ===
==== Armenia vs. North Macedonia ====
Armenia
2
SEB Arena, Vilnius, Lithuania
19 June 2021
Hard (indoor)

North Macedonia
1

			1	2	3
1	(Armenia) (North Macedonia)	Irena Muradyan; Jana Tanevska	6; 1	6; 1
2	(Armenia) (North Macedonia)	Gabriella Akopyan; Iva Daneva	6; 1	7^{7} 6^{4}
3	(Armenia) (North Macedonia)	Milena Gevorgyan / Arevik Tumanyan; Katarina Marinkovikj / Aleksandra Simeva	3; 6	3; 6

== 13th to 18th play-offs ==
The third placed teams of each pool were drawn in head-to-head rounds to find the equal 13th placed teams.

=== Semifinals ===
==== Zimbabwe vs. Rwanda ====
Zimbabwe
3
SEB Arena, Vilnius, Lithuania
18 June 2021
Hard (indoor)

Rwanda
0

			1	2	3
1	(Zimbabwe) (Rwanda)	Tadiwanashe Eunice Mauchi; Megane Ingabire	6; 1	6; 4
2	(Zimbabwe) (Rwanda)	Valeria Bhunu; Joselyn Umulisa	6; 2	6; 0
3	(Zimbabwe) (Rwanda)	Tadiwanashe Eunice Mauchi / Tanyaradzwa Midzi; Megane Ingabire / Sonia Tuyishime	6; 0	6; 0

==== Albania vs. Azerbaijan ====
Albania
1
SEB Arena, Vilnius, Lithuania
18 June 2021
Hard (indoor)

Azerbaijan
2

			1	2	3
1	(Albania) (Azerbaijan)	Kristal Dule; Zuleykha Safarova	6; 2	6; 2
2	(Albania) (Azerbaijan)	Gresi Bajri; Umayra Hashimova	3; 6	4; 6
3	(Albania) (Azerbaijan)	Gresi Bajri / Juna Dani; Umayra Hashimova / Zuleykha Safarova	7; 5	1; 6	6^{7} 7^{9}

=== 13th place play-offs ===
==== Kosovo vs. Zimbabwe ====
Kosovo
2
SEB Arena, Vilnius, Lithuania
19 June 2021
Hard (indoor)

Zimbabwe
1

			1	2	3
1	(Kosovo) (Zimbabwe)	Donika Bashota; Tadiwanashe Eunice Mauchi	6; 1	6; 1
2	(Kosovo) (Zimbabwe)	Adrijana Lekaj; Tanyaradzwa Midzi	6; 2	6; 3
3	(Kosovo) (Zimbabwe)	Ana Broqi / Vesa Gjinaj; Tadiwanashe Eunice Mauchi / Tanyraradza Midzi	6; 4	1; 6	2; 3	retired

==== Azerbaijan vs. Iceland ====
Azerbaijan
3
SEB Arena, Vilnius, Lithuania
19 June 2021
Hard (indoor)

Iceland
0

			1	2	3
1	(Azerbaijan) (Iceland)	Alina Gavrish; Anna Soffia Grönholm	6; 4	6; 3
2	(Azerbaijan) (Iceland)	Umayra Hashimova; Sofia Sóley Jónasdóttir	7; 5	7^{7} 6^{5}
3	(Azerbaijan) (Iceland)	Alina Guseynova / Umayra Hashimova; Anna Soffia Grönholm / Sandra Kristjansdóttir	6; 4	6; 1

=== 17th place play-off ===
==== Rwanda vs. Albania ====
Rwanda
0
SEB Arena, Vilnius, Lithuania
19 June 2021
Hard (indoor)

Albania
3

			1	2	3
1	(Rwanda) (Albania)	Sonia Tuyishime; Kristal Dule	1; 6	0; 6
2	(Rwanda) (Albania)	Joselyn Umulisa; Gresi Bajri	1; 6	0; 6
3	(Rwanda) (Albania)	Megane Ingabire / Joselyn Umulisa; Gresi Bajri / Juna Dani	1; 6	3; 6

== 19th to 21st play-offs ==
The fourth placed teams of each pool were drawn in head-to-head rounds to find the 19th placed team.

=== Semifinal ===
==== Ghana vs. Namibia ====
Ghana
1
SEB Arena, Vilnius, Lithuania
18 June 2021
Hard (indoor)

Namibia
2

			1	2	3
1	(Ghana) (Namibia)	Nyanyuie Grace Tomegah; Carita Moolman	2; 6	7^{7} 6^{5}	6; 4
2	(Ghana) (Namibia)	Naa Shika Mckorley; Georgina Moolman	2; 6	0; 6
3	(Ghana) (Namibia)	Naa Anyema Mckorley / Nyanyuie Grace Tomegah; Georgina Moolman / Liniques Theron	3; 6	0; 6

=== 19th place play-offs ===
==== Kenya vs. Namibia ====
Kenya
1
SEB Arena, Vilnius, Lithuania
19 June 2021
Hard (indoor)

Namibia
2

			1	2	3
1	(Kenya) (Namibia)	Alicia Owegi; Taimi Nashiku	7; 5	6; 4
2	(Kenya) (Namibia)	Cynthia Wanjala; Georgina Moolman	0; 6	1; 6
3	(Kenya) (Namibia)	Alicia Owegi / Cynthia Wanjala; Carita Moolman / Liniques Theron	3; 6	3; 6

=== Final placements ===
Placing	Teams	
Promoted/First	Norway	Lithuania
Third	Bosnia and Herzegovina	Malta
Fifth	Ireland	
Sixth	South Africa	
Seventh	Cyprus	Montenegro
Ninth	Nigeria	Algeria
Eleventh	Armenia	
Twelfth	North Macedonia	
Thirteenth	Kosovo	Azerbaijan
Fifteenth	Zimbabwe	Iceland
Seventeenth	Albania	
Eighteenth	Rwanda	
Nineteenth	Namibia	
Twentieth	Kenya	
Twenty-first	Ghana	

- Norway and Lithuania were promoted to Europe/Africa Zone Group II in 2022.
