= 2021 Billie Jean King Cup Americas Zone Group II – play-offs =

Subsection of tennis competition

The play-offs of the 2021 Billie Jean King Cup Americas Zone Group II were the final stages of the Group II zonal competition involving teams from the Americas. Using the positions determined in their pools, the fifteen teams faced off to determine their placing in the 2021 Billie Jean King Cup Americas Zone Group II. The top two teams advanced to Billie Jean King Cup Americas Zone Group I.

Placing	Pool A (Panama City)	Pool B (Panama City)	Pool A (La Paz)	Pool B (La Paz)
1	Uruguay	Ecuador	Guatemala	Bolivia
2	Bahamas	El Salvador	Dominican Republic	Honduras
3	Costa Rica	Cuba	Jamaica	Puerto Rico
4	—	Panama	—	Barbados

== Promotional play-offs ==
The first placed teams of each pool were drawn in head-to-head round. The winners advanced to Group I in 2022.

=== Ecuador vs. Uruguay ===
Ecuador
2
Centro de Alto Rendimiento Fred Maduro, Panama City, Panama
26 June 2021
Clay

Uruguay
0

			1	2	3
1	(Ecuador) (Uruguay)	Charlotte Römer; Guillermina Grant	7; 5	3; 6	6; 3
2	(Ecuador) (Uruguay)	Mell Reasco; Isabella Tiscornia	6; 0	6; 1
3	(Ecuador) (Uruguay)	Marie Elise Casares / Camila Romero; Guillermina Grant / Juliana Rodríguez				not played

=== Guatemala vs. Bolivia ===
Guatemala
2
Club de Tenis La Paz, La Paz, Bolivia
30 October 2021
Clay

Bolivia
0

			1	2	3
1	(Guatemala) (Bolivia)	Melissa Morales; Gabriela Cortés Flores	6; 3	6; 2
2	(Guatemala) (Bolivia)	Kirsten-Andrea Weedon; Noelia Zeballos	7; 5	6; 3
3	(Guatemala) (Bolivia)	Melissa Morales / Gabriela Rivera; Fiorella Durán Montaño / Noelia Zeballos				not played

== 3rd to 4th play-offs ==
The second placed teams of each pool were drawn in head-to-head rounds to find the 3rd placed teams.

=== Bahamas vs. El Salvador ===
Bahamas
2
Centro de Alto Rendimiento Fred Maduro, Panama City, Panama
26 June 2021
Clay

El Salvador
0

			1	2	3
1	(The Bahamas) (El Salvador)	Sydney Clarke; Matia Cristiani	6; 3	6; 3
2	(The Bahamas) (El Salvador)	Kerrie Cartwright; Sara Valentina Cruz Bonilla	6; 3	6; 4
3	(The Bahamas) (El Salvador)	Kerrie Cartwright / Sydney Clarke; Matia Cristiani / Sara Valentina Cruz Bonilla				not played

=== Dominican Republic vs. Honduras ===
Dominican Republic
2
Club de Tenis La Paz, La Paz, Bolivia
30 October 2021
Clay

Honduras
1

			1	2	3
1	(Dominican Republic) (Honduras)	María Gell; Daniela Obando	5; 7	3; 6
2	(Dominican Republic) (Honduras)	Kelly Williford; Alejandra Obando	6; 0	6; 0
3	(Dominican Republic) (Honduras)	María Gell / Kelly Williford; Daniela Obando / Ana Gabriela Zavala Mata	6; 3	6; 3

== 5th to 6th play-offs ==
The third placed teams of each pool were drawn in head-to-head rounds to find the 5th placed teams.

=== Costa Rica vs. Cuba ===
Costa Rica
2
Centro de Alto Rendimiento Fred Maduro, Panama City, Panama
26 June 2021
Clay

Cuba
0

			1	2	3
1	(Costa Rica) (Cuba)	Sofía Pérez; Roxana Valdez	6; 0	6; 1
2	(Costa Rica) (Cuba)	Ariana Rahmanparast; Sachely Carrera	6; 1	6; 1
3	(Costa Rica) (Cuba)	Sofía Pérez / Ariana Rahmanparast; Sachely Carrera / Roxana Valdez				not played

=== Jamaica vs. Puerto Rico ===
Jamaica
0
Club de Tenis La Paz, La Paz, Bolivia
30 October 2021
Clay

Puerto Rico
3

			1	2	3
1	(Jamaica) (Puerto Rico)	Katherine Dibbs; Natalia Pérez	0; 6	3; 6
2	(Jamaica) (Puerto Rico)	Junmoke James; Dakota Fordham	4; 6	2; 6
3	(Jamaica) (Puerto Rico)	Katherine Dibbs / Shea-Ann Kameka; Julieanne Bou / Dakota Fordham	0; 6	1; 6

== Final placements ==
Placing	Teams	
Promoted/First	Ecuador	Guatemala
Second	Uruguay	Bolivia
Third	Bahamas	Dominican Republic
Fourth	El Salvador	Honduras
Fifth	Costa Rica	Puerto Rico
Sixth	Cuba	Jamaica
Seventh	Panama	Barbados

- Ecuador and Guatemala were promoted to Americas Zone Group I in 2022.
