= Zuleykha Safarova =

Azerbaijani tennis player

- Native name: Züleyxa Səfərova
- Country (sports): Azerbaijan
- Born: 27 November 1999 (age 26) Azerbaijan
- Prize money: $3,254

Singles
- Career record: 0–4
- Highest ranking: –

Doubles
- Career record: 1–2
- Highest ranking: –
- Last updated on: 14 June 2021.

Zuleykha Safarova (Azerbaijani: Züleyxa Səfərova; born 27 November 1999) is an Azerbaijani tennis player.

Safarova made her WTA main draw debut at the 2015 Baku Cup, receiving a wildcard into the singles draw. She lost her first round match to Oleksandra Korashvili, 6–0, 6–0. She also lost in the first round of the doubles, partnering Amine Dik.

Safarova has represented Azerbaijan in international competitions since 2011, and was Champion of the Azerbaijan Republic for two years in a row (in 2013 and 2014). She competed at the 2017 Islamic Solidarity Games.

== National representation ==
=== Billie Jean King Cup ===
Safarova made her Billie Jean King debut for Azerbaijan in 2021, while the team was competing in the Europe/Africa Zone Group III, when she was 21 years and 200 days old.

==== Billie Jean King Cup (1–2) ====
| Group membership World Group (0–0) World Group Play-off (0–0) World Group II (0–0) World Group II Play-off (0–0) Europe/Africa Group (1–2) | Matches by surface Hard (1–2) Clay (0–0) Grass (0–0) Carpet (0–0) | Matches by type Singles (0–1) Doubles (1–1) | Matches by setting Indoors (1–2) Outdoors (0–0) |

==== Singles (0–1) ====
| Edition | Stage | Date | Location | Against | Surface | Opponent | W/L | Score |
|---|---|---|---|---|---|---|---|---|
| 2020–21 Billie Jean King Cup; Europe/Africa Zone Group III | Pool F | 15 June 2021 | Vilnius, Lithuania | Montenegro | Hard (i) | Tea Nikčević | L | 1–6, 3–6 |

==== Doubles (1–1) ====
| Edition | Stage | Date | Location | Against | Surface | Partner | Opponents | W/L | Score |
|---|---|---|---|---|---|---|---|---|---|
| 2020–21 Billie Jean King Cup; Europe/Africa Zone Group III | Pool F | 16 June 2021 | Vilnius, Lithuania | South Africa | Hard (i) | Alina Guseynova | Delien Kleinhans; Lara van der Merwe | L | 0–6, 0–6 |
| 2020–21 Billie Jean King Cup; Europe/Africa Zone Group III | Pool F | 17 June 2021 | Vilnius, Lithuania | Namibia | Hard (i) | Umayra Hashimova | Carita Moolman; Liniques Theron | W | 7–5, 7–5 |
