= 2016 Fed Cup Europe/Africa Zone Group III – play-offs =

International tennis competition play-offs

The play-offs of the 2016 Fed Cup Europe/Africa Zone Group III were the final stages of the Group III zonal competition involving teams from Europe and Africa. Using the positions determined in their pools, the seventeen teams faced off to determine their placing in the 2016 Fed Cup Europe/Africa Zone Group III. The top two teams advanced to Fed Cup Europe/Africa Zone Group II.

Placing	Pool A	Pool B	Pool C	Pool D
1	Luxembourg	Macedonia	Moldova	Norway
2	Greece	Ireland	Madagascar	Montenegro
3	Tunisia	Armenia	Cyprus	Morocco
4	Malta	Iceland	Algeria	Kosovo
5	—N/a	—N/a	—N/a	Mozambique

== Promotional play-offs ==
The first placed teams of each pool were drawn in head-to-head rounds. The winners advanced to Group II in 2017.

=== Luxembourg vs. Moldova ===
Luxembourg
2
Bellevue, Ulcinj, Montenegro
16 April 2016
Outdoor clay

Moldova
0

			1	2	3
1	(Luxembourg) (Moldova)	Eléonora Molinaro; Vitalia Stamat	6; 2	6; 0
2	(Luxembourg) (Moldova)	Mandy Minella; Adriana Sosnovschi	6; 3	6; 4
3	(Luxembourg) (Moldova)	Mandy Minella / Claudine Schaul; Adriana Sosnovschi / Vitalia Stamat				not played

=== Macedonia vs. Norway ===
Macedonia
0
Bellevue, Ulcinj, Montenegro
16 April 2016
Outdoor clay

Norway
2

			1	2	3
1	(North Macedonia) (Norway)	Katarina Marinkovikj; Melanie Stokke	1; 6	1; 6
2	(North Macedonia) (Norway)	Magdalena Stoilkovska; Ulrikke Eikeri	3; 6	4; 6
3	(North Macedonia) (Norway)	Katarina Marinkovikj / Magdalena Stoilkovska; Ulrikke Eikeri / Melanie Stokke				not played

== 5th to 8th play-offs ==
The second placed teams of each pool were drawn in head-to-head rounds to find the equal fifth and seventh placed teams.

=== Greece vs. Madagascar ===
Greece
2
Bellevue, Ulcinj, Montenegro
15 April 2016
Outdoor clay

Madagascar
0

			1	2	3
1	(Greece) (Madagascar)	Eleni Christofi; Zarah Razafimahatratra	6; 1	6; 1
2	(Greece) (Madagascar)	Despina Papamichail; Sandra Andriamarosoa	6; 0	6; 2
3	(Greece) (Madagascar)	Eleni Christofi / Despina Papamichail; Faniry Andrianjafitrimo / Seheno Razafindramaso				not played

=== Ireland vs. Montenegro ===
Ireland
0
Bellevue, Ulcinj, Montenegro
16 April 2016
Outdoor clay

Montenegro
2

			1	2	3
1	(Republic of Ireland) (Montenegro)	Anna Bowtell; Anja Drašković	0; 6	0; 6
2	(Republic of Ireland) (Montenegro)	Jennifer Timotin; Ana Veselinović	1; 6	3; 6
3	(Republic of Ireland) (Montenegro)	Georgia Drummy / Jennifer Timotin; Anja Drašković / Ana Veselinović				not played

== 9th to 12th play-offs ==
The third placed teams of each pool were drawn in head-to-head rounds to find the equal ninth and eleventh placed teams.

=== Tunisia vs. Cyprus ===
Tunisia
2
Bellevue, Ulcinj, Montenegro
15 April 2016
Outdoor clay

Cyprus
0

			1	2	3
1	(Tunisia) (Cyprus)	Chiraz Bechri; Anna Savchenko	6; 4	6; 2
2	(Tunisia) (Cyprus)	Ons Jabeur; Eliza Omirou	6; 3	6; 2
3	(Tunisia) (Cyprus)	Mouna Bouzgarrou / Diana Chehoudi; Eliza Omirou / Anna Savchenko				not played

=== Armenia vs. Morocco ===
Armenia
2
Bellevue, Ulcinj, Montenegro
16 April 2016
Outdoor clay

Morocco
1

			1	2	3
1	(Armenia) (Morocco)	Ani Safaryan; Zaineb El Houari	1; 6	0; 6
2	(Armenia) (Morocco)	Ani Amiraghyan; Diae El Jardi	6; 0	6; 1
3	(Armenia) (Morocco)	Ani Amiraghyan / Lusine Chobanyan; Rita Atik / Ghita Benhadi	7; 5	6; 0

== 13th to 16th play-offs ==
The fourth placed teams of each pool were drawn in head-to-head rounds to find the equal thirteenth and fifteenth placed teams.

=== Malta vs. Algeria ===
Malta
0
Bellevue, Ulcinj, Montenegro
16 April 2016
Outdoor clay

Algeria
2

			1	2	3
1	(Malta) (Algeria)	Katrina Sammut; Lynda Benkaddour	4; 6	6; 4	3; 6
2	(Malta) (Algeria)	Elaine Genovese; Amira Benaissa	3; 6	4; 6
3	(Malta) (Algeria)	Elaine Genovese / Katrina Sammut; Amira Benaissa / Lynda Benkaddour				not played

=== Iceland vs. Kosovo ===
Iceland
1
Bellevue, Ulcinj, Montenegro
16 April 2016
Outdoor clay

Kosovo
2

			1	2	3
1	(Iceland) (Kosovo)	Anna Soffia Gronholm; Arlinda Rushiti	0; 6	0; 6
2	(Iceland) (Kosovo)	Hera Brynjarsdóttir; Edita Raca	6; 2	6^{4} 7^{7}	6; 2
3	(Iceland) (Kosovo)	Hera Brynjarsdóttir / Anna Soffia Gronholm; Edita Raca / Arlinda Rushiti	3; 6	4; 6

=== Final placements ===
Placing	Teams	
Promoted/First	Luxembourg	Norway
Third	Moldova	Macedonia
Fifth	Greece	Montenegro
Seventh	Madagascar	Ireland
Ninth	Tunisia	Armenia
Eleventh	Cyprus	Morocco
Thirteenth	Algeria	Kosovo
Fifteenth	Malta	Iceland
Seventeenth	Mozambique	

- Luxembourg and Norway were promoted to Europe/Africa Zone Group II in 2017.
