= Sophia Derivan =

Irish tennis player

- Country (sports): Ireland
- Born: 9 June 2000 (age 24); Dublin, Ireland
- College: University of Colorado (2019-)
- Prize money: $294

Singles
- Career record: 2–4
- Career titles: 0 ITF

Doubles
- Career record: 2–1
- Career titles: 0 ITF

Team competitions
- Fed Cup: 4–2
- Last updated on: 17 June 2021.

Sophia Derivan (born 9 June 2000) is an Irish junior tennis player.

On the juniors tour, Derivan has a career high ITF junior combined ranking of 354, achieved on 24 April 2017.

She started studying at University of Colorado, in 2019.

== ITF junior finals ==
Grand Slam
Category GA
Category G1
Category G2
Category G3
Category G4
Category G5

=== Singles (2–1) ===
Outcome	W–L	Date	Tournament	Grade	Surface	Opponent	Score
Winner	1–0	24 July 2015	Dublin, Ireland	G5	Carpet	(United Kingdom) Alice Gillan	6–0, 1–6, 6–3
Runner-up	1–1	22 July 2016	Dublin, Ireland	G5	Carpet	(Republic of Ireland) Caoimhe Duffy Niblock	3–6, 6–1, 2–6
Winner	2–1	4 August 2017	Dundalk, Ireland	G5	Carpet	(United Kingdom) Erin Richardson	6–3, 6–3

=== Doubles (3–2) ===
Outcome	W–L	Date	Tournament	Grade	Surface	Partner	Opponents	Score
Winner	1–0	24 July 2015	Dublin, Ireland	G5	Carpet	(Republic of Ireland) Lucy Octave	(Republic of Ireland) Annie McCullough (Republic of Ireland) Caitlin McCullough	6–2, 6–2
Runner-up	1–1	18 June 2016	Odense, Denmark	G4	Clay	(India) Sabhyata Nihalani	(Russia) Anastasia Abramyan (Hungary) Csenge Furák	4–6, 4–6
Winner	2–1	22 July 2016	Dublin, Ireland	G5	Carpet	(United Kingdom) Summer Yardley	(France) Kristina Baran (Hungary) Fanni Gécsek	6–1, 6–4
Runner-up	2–2	29 July 2016	Belfast, Great Britain	G5	Carpet	(United Kingdom) Summer Yardley	(Republic of Ireland) Anna Bowtell (Republic of Ireland) Eimear Maher	5–7, 6–4, [6–10]
Winner	3–2	5 August 2016	Dundalk, Ireland	G5	Carpet	(Republic of Ireland) Anna Bowtell	(Republic of Ireland) Shauna Heffernan (United Kingdom) Summer Yardley	6–2, 7–5

== National representation ==
=== Fed Cup ===
Derivan made her Fed Cup debut for Ireland in 2017, while the team was competing in the Europe/Africa Zone Group III, when she was 17 years and 4 days old.

==== Fed Cup (5–3) ====
Group membership World Group (0–0) World Group Play-off (0–0) World Group II (0–0) World Group II Play-off (0–0) Europe/Africa Group (5–3)	Matches by surface Hard (4–1) Clay (1–2) Grass (0–0) Carpet (0–0)	Matches by type Singles (1–1) Doubles (4–2)	Matches by setting Indoors (4–1) Outdoors (1–2)

===== Singles (1–1) =====
Edition	Stage	Date	Location	Against	Surface	Opponent	W/L	Score
2017 Fed Cup; Europe/Africa Zone Group III	Pool B	13 June 2017	Chișinău, Moldova	Iceland	Clay	Anna Soffía Grönholm	W	6–0, 6–2
2017 Fed Cup; Europe/Africa Zone Group III	Pool B	14 June 2017	Chișinău, Moldova	Kenya	Clay	Sneha Kotecha	L	6–0, 4–6, 5–7

===== Doubles (4–2) =====
Edition	Stage	Date	Location	Against	Surface	Partner	Opponents	W/L	Score
2017 Fed Cup; Europe/Africa Zone Group III	Pool B	16 June 2017	Chișinău, Moldova	Cyprus	Clay	Ruth Copas	Eleni Louka; Anna Savchenko	L	0–6, 6–7^{(4–7)}
2020–21 Billie Jean King Cup; Europe/Africa Zone Group III	Pool D	15 June 2021	Vilnius, Lithuania	Ghana	Hard (i)	Shauna Heffernan	Naa Anyema Mckorley; Nyanyuie Grace Tomegah	W	6–0, 6–0
2020–21 Billie Jean King Cup; Europe/Africa Zone Group III	Pool D	16 June 2021	Vilnius, Lithuania	Iceland	Hard (i)	Shauna Heffernan	Hera Brynjarsdóttir; Sofia Sóley Jónasdóttir	W	6–0, 6–1
2020–21 Billie Jean King Cup; Europe/Africa Zone Group III	Pool D	17 June 2021	Vilnius, Lithuania	Armenia	Hard (i)	Shauna Heffernan	Milena Gevorgyan; Arevik Tumanyan	W	6–2, 6–2
2020–21 Billie Jean King Cup; Europe/Africa Zone Group III	Play-off	18 June 2021	Vilnius, Lithuania	Bosnia and Herzegovina	Hard (i)	Shauna Heffernan	Anita Husarić; Suana Tucaković	L	5–7, 1–6
2020–21 Billie Jean King Cup; Europe/Africa Zone Group III	Play-off	19 June 2021	Vilnius, Lithuania	South Africa	Hard (i)	Shauna Heffernan	Chanel Simmonds; Lara van der Merwe	W	6–3, 6–4
