= 2021 Billie Jean King Cup Europe/Africa Zone Group III – Pool B =

Subsection of tennis competition

Pool B of the 2021 Billie Jean King Cup Europe/Africa Group III was one of six pools in the Europe/Africa Group III of the 2020–21 Billie Jean King Cup. Three teams competed in a round robin competition, with the top team and bottom teams proceeding to their respective section of the play-offs: the top team played for advancement to Group II.

== Standings ==
		BIH	CYP	RWA	RR; W–L	Set; W–L	Game; W–L	Standings
12	Bosnia and Herzegovina		2–1	3–0	5–1	11–2 (85%)	75–30 (71%)	1
2	Cyprus	1–2		3–0	4–2	8–5 (62%)	64–40 (62%)	2
–	Rwanda	0–3	0–3		0–6	0–12 (0%)	3–72 (4%)	3

Standings are determined by: 1. number of wins; 2. if two teams have the same number of wins, head-to-head record; 3. if three teams have the same number of wins, (a) number of matches won in the group, then (b) percentage of sets won in the group, then (c) percentage of games won in the group, then (d) Billie Jean King Cup rankings.

== Round robin ==
=== Cyprus vs. Rwanda ===
Cyprus
3
SEB Arena, Vilnius, Lithuania
15 June 2021
Hard (indoor)

Rwanda
0

			1	2	3
1	(Cyprus) (Rwanda)	Eleni Louka; Megane Ingabire	6; 0	6; 0
2	(Cyprus) (Rwanda)	Raluca Șerban; Joselyn Umulisa	6; 0	6; 0
3	(Cyprus) (Rwanda)	Florentia Hadjigeorgiou / Maria Siopacha; Megane Ingabire / Joselyn Umulisa	6; 0	6; 1

=== Bosnia and Herzegovina vs. Rwanda ===
Bosnia and Herzegovina
3
SEB Arena, Vilnius, Lithuania
16 Jun 2021
Hard (indoor)

Rwanda
0

			1	2	3
1	(Bosnia and Herzegovina) (Rwanda)	Nefisa Berberović; Megane Ingabire	6; 0	6; 1
2	(Bosnia and Herzegovina) (Rwanda)	Dea Herdželaš; Joselyn Umulisa	6; 1	6; 0
3	(Bosnia and Herzegovina) (Rwanda)	Anita Husarić / Suana Tucaković; Olive Tuyisenge / Joselyn Umulisa	6; 0	6; 0

=== Cyprus vs. Bosnia and Herzegovina ===
Cyprus
1
SEB Arena, Vilnius, Lithuania
17 June 2021
Hard (indoor)

Bosnia and Herzegovina
2

			1	2	3
1	(Cyprus) (Bosnia and Herzegovina)	Eleni Louka; Nefisa Berberović	6^{1} 7^{7}	0; 6
2	(Cyprus) (Bosnia and Herzegovina)	Raluca Șerban; Dea Herdželaš	6; 4	5; 7	6; 3
3	(Cyprus) (Bosnia and Herzegovina)	Eleni Louka / Raluca Șerban; Nefisa Berberović / Dea Herdželaš	3; 6	2; 6

== See also ==
- Billie Jean King Cup structure
