= 2020 Billie Jean King Cup Americas Zone Group I – play-offs =

The play-offs of the 2020 Billie Jean King Cup Americas Zone Group I were the final stages of the Group I zonal competition involving teams from the Americas. Using the positions determined in their pools, the seven teams faced off to determine their placing in the 2020 Billie Jean King Cup Americas Zone Group I. The top two teams advanced to the 2020 Billie Jean King Cup play-offs, while the bottom two teams were relegated to Americas Zone Group II for 2022.

== Pool results ==
Placing	Pool A	Pool B
1	Paraguay	Argentina
2	Colombia	Mexico
3	Venezuela	Chile
4	—N/a	Peru

== Promotional play-offs ==
The first-place teams of each pool played against one another in a head-to-head round. The winners of each round advanced to the 2020 Billie Jean King Cup play-offs.

=== Paraguay vs. Mexico ===
Paraguay
1
Club Palestino, Santiago, Chile
8 February 2020
Clay

Mexico
2

			1	2	3
1	(Paraguay) (Mexico)	Lara Escauriza; Fernanda Contreras Gómez	1; 6	6; 1	3; 6
2	(Paraguay) (Mexico)	Verónica Cepede Royg; Giuliana Olmos	6; 1	6; 3
3	(Paraguay) (Mexico)	Verónica Cepede Royg / Lara Escauriza; Fernanda Contreras Gómez / Giuliana Olmos	6; 2	3; 6	6^{4} 7^{7}

=== Argentina vs. Colombia ===
Argentina
2
Club Palestino, Santiago, Chile
8 February 2020
Clay

Colombia
0

			1	2	3
1	(Argentina) (Colombia)	Nadia Podoroska; Emiliana Arango	7; 5	6; 2
2	(Argentina) (Colombia)	Paula Ormaechea; Camila Osorio	6; 4	6; 4
3	(Argentina) (Colombia)	Paula Ormaechea / Nadia Podoroska; Emiliana Arango / Camila Osorio				not played

== Relegation play-offs ==
The third-placed teams of each pool played against one another in a head-to-head round. The loser of the tie was relegated to Americas Zone Group II in 2022, alongside Peru who finished fourth in Pool B.

=== Venezuela vs. Chile ===
Venezuela
1
Club Palestino, Santiago, Chile
8 February 2020
Clay

Chile
2

			1	2	3
1	(Venezuela) (Chile)	Aymet Uzcátegui; Bárbara Gatica	2; 6	0; 6
2	(Venezuela) (Chile)	Andrea Gámiz; Daniela Seguel	7^{7} 6^{3}	4; 6	6; 0
3	(Venezuela) (Chile)	Andrea Gámiz / Aymet Uzcátegui; Bárbara Gatica / Alexa Guarachi	2; 6	4; 6

== Final placements ==
Placing	Teams	
Promoted/First	Argentina	Mexico
Third	Colombia	Paraguay
Fifth	Chile	
Sixth/Relegated	Venezuela	
Seventh/Relegated	Peru	

- Argentina and Mexico were promoted to the 2020 Billie Jean King Cup play-offs.
- Peru and Venezuela were relegated to Americas Zone Group II in 2022.
