= 2017 Fed Cup Europe/Africa Zone Group III – Pool B =

Subsection of tennis competition

Pool B of the 2017 Fed Cup Europe/Africa Group III was one of four pools in the Europe/Africa Group III of the 2017 Fed Cup. Four teams competed in a round robin competition, with the top team and bottom teams proceeding to their respective section of the play-offs: the top team played for advancement to Group II.

== Standings ==
		CYP	IRL	KEN	ISL	RR; W–L	Set; W–L	Game; W–L	Standings
83	Cyprus		3–0	3–0	3–0	3–0	18–1 (95%)	115–28 (80%)	1
72	Ireland	0–3		2–1	3–0	2–1	12–8 (60%)	96–80 (55%)	2
97	Kenya	0–3	1–2		2–1	1–2	6–14 (30%)	59–104 (36%)	3
102	Iceland	0–3	0–3	1–2		0–3	3–16 (16%)	46–104 (31%)	4

Standings are determined by: 1. number of wins; 2. if two teams have the same number of wins, head-to-head record; 3. if three teams have the same number of wins, (a) number of matches won in the group, then (b) percentage of sets won in the group, then (c) percentage of games won in the group, then (d) Fed Cup rankings.

== Round-robin ==
=== Ireland vs. Iceland ===
Ireland
3
National Tennis School & Tennis Club Acvila, Chișinău, Moldova
13 June 2017
Clay

Iceland
0

			1	2	3
1	(Republic of Ireland) (Iceland)	Sophia Derivan; Anna Soffia Gronholm	6; 0	6; 2
2	(Republic of Ireland) (Iceland)	Jennifer Timotin; Hera Brynjarsdóttir	6; 3	7^{7} 6^{3}
3	(Republic of Ireland) (Iceland)	Ruth Copas / Jane Fennelly; Hera Brynjarsdóttir / Anna Soffía Grönholm	6; 2	6; 2

=== Cyprus vs. Kenya ===
Cyprus
3
National Tennis School & Tennis Club Acvila, Chișinău, Moldova
13 June 2017
Clay

Kenya
0

			1	2	3
1	(Cyprus) (Kenya)	Maria Siopacha; Sneha Kotecha	6; 3	6; 1
2	(Cyprus) (Kenya)	Eliza Omirou; Shufaa Changawa Ruwa	6; 0	6; 2
3	(Cyprus) (Kenya)	Eliza Omirou / Maria Siopacha; Katarina Karanja / Judith Nkatha	6; 0	6; 0

=== Ireland vs. Kenya ===
Ireland
2
National Tennis School & Tennis Club Acvila, Chișinău, Moldova
14 June 2017
Clay

Kenya
1

			1	2	3
1	(Republic of Ireland) (Kenya)	Sophia Derivan; Sneha Kotecha	6; 0	4; 6	5; 7
2	(Republic of Ireland) (Kenya)	Jennifer Timotin; Shufaa Changawa Ruwa	6; 3	6; 2
3	(Republic of Ireland) (Kenya)	Ruth Copas / Jane Fennelly; Sneha Kotecha / Shufaa Changawa Ruwa	6; 3	6; 1

=== Cyprus vs. Iceland ===
Cyprus
3
National Tennis School & Tennis Club Acvila, Chișinău, Moldova
14 June 2017
Clay

Iceland
0

			1	2	3
1	(Cyprus) (Iceland)	Maria Siopacha; Sofia Sóley Jónasdóttir	6; 0	6; 1
2	(Cyprus) (Iceland)	Eliza Omirou; Anna Soffía Grönholm	6; 0	6; 1
3	(Cyprus) (Iceland)	Eliza Omirou / Maria Siopacha; Hera Brynjarsdóttir / Sofia Sóley Jónasdóttir	6; 0	6; 0

=== Ireland vs. Cyprus ===
Ireland
0
National Tennis School & Tennis Club Acvila, Chișinău, Moldova
16 June 2017
Clay

Cyprus
3

			1	2	3
1	(Republic of Ireland) (Cyprus)	Jane Fennelly; Maria Siopacha	7^{7} 6^{4}	3; 6	1; 6
2	(Republic of Ireland) (Cyprus)	Jennifer Timotin; Eliza Omirou	3; 6	0; 6
3	(Republic of Ireland) (Cyprus)	Ruth Copas / Sophia Derivan; Eleni Louka / Anna Savchenko	0; 6	6^{4} 7^{7}

=== Kenya vs. Iceland ===
Kenya
2
National Tennis School & Tennis Club Acvila, Chișinău, Moldova
16 June 2017
Clay

Iceland
1

			1	2	3
1	(Kenya) (Iceland)	Sneha Kotecha; Anna Soffía Grönholm	6; 4	6; 0
2	(Kenya) (Iceland)	Shufaa Changawa Ruwa; Hera Brynjarsdóttir	6; 4	3; 6	6; 3
3	(Kenya) (Iceland)	Katarina Karanja / Judith Nkatha; Hera Brynjarsdóttir / Anna Soffía Grönholm	2; 6	2; 6

== See also ==
- Fed Cup structure
