= Jennifer Timotin =

Irish tennis player

- Country (sports): Ireland
- Born: 5 November 1999 (age 26) Dublin, Ireland
- College: Fresno State (2018-19); Michigan State (2019-2021)
- Prize money: $2,757

Singles
- Career record: 20–17
- Career titles: 0 ITF
- Highest ranking: 1,121 (21 May 2018)

Doubles
- Career record: 4–5
- Career titles: 0 ITF

Team competitions
- Fed Cup: 6–5
- Last updated on: 23 December 2019.

Jennifer Timotin (born 5 November 1999) is an Irish tennis player.

Timotin career high singles ranking is world No. 1,121, which she achieved on 21 May 2018.

On the juniors tour, Timotin has a career high ITF junior combined ranking of 304, achieved on 25 January 2016.

She started studying at Fresno State, in 2018. In 2019 she transferred to Michigan State University.

== ITF Circuit finals ==
=== Doubles (0–1) ===
Legend $100,000 tournaments $80,000 tournaments $60,000 tournaments $25,000 tournaments $15,000 tournaments	Finals by surface Hard (0–1) Clay (0–0) Grass (0–0) Carpet (0–0)

Result	W–L	Date	Tournament	Tier	Surface	Partner	Opponents	Score
Loss	0–1	Jul 2017	ITF Sharm El Sheikh, Egypt	15,000	Hard	(Australia) Ella Husrefovic	(India) Kanika Vaidya (Russia) Ekaterina Yashina	2–6, 0–6

== ITF junior finals ==
Grand Slam
Category GA
Category G1
Category G2
Category G3
Category G4
Category G5

=== Singles (0–4) ===
Outcome	W–L	Date	Tournament	Grade	Surface	Opponent	Score
Runner-up	0–1	25 July 2014	Dublin, Ireland	G5	Carpet	(United Kingdom) Emily Appleton	6–4, 3–6, 2–6
Runner-up	0–2	22 November 2014	Liverpool, Great Britain	G5	Hard	(United Kingdom) Megan Davies	5–7, 6–1, 3–6
Runner-up	0–3	31 July 2015	Belfast, Great Britain	G5	Carpet	(Republic of Ireland) Georgia Drummy	4–6, 2–6
Runner-up	0–4	7 August 2015	Dundalk, Ireland	G5	Carpet	(Republic of Ireland) Georgia Drummy	4–6, 1–6

=== Doubles (4–2) ===
Outcome	W–L	Date	Tournament	Grade	Surface	Partner	Opponents	Score
Winner	1–0	1 August 2014	Belfast, Great Britain	G5	Carpet	(Republic of Ireland) Georgia Drummy	(Republic of Ireland) Annie McCullough (Republic of Ireland) Caitlin McCullough	6–2, 6–2
Winner	2–0	26 April 2015	Nottingham, Great Britain	G4	Hard	(Republic of Ireland) Georgia Drummy	(United Kingdom) Holly Horsfall (United Kingdom) Elise van Heuvelen	6–3, 6–3
Runner-up	2–1	27 June 2015	Mahdia, Tunisia	G4	Hard	(Republic of Ireland) Georgia Drummy	(Tunisia) Chiraz Bechri (Egypt) Farah Abdel-Wahab	6–1, 5–7, [8–10]
Winner	3–1	31 July 2015	Belfast, Great Britain	G5	Carpet	(Republic of Ireland) Georgia Drummy	(United Kingdom) Maria Budin (United Kingdom) Megan Davies	6–4, 5–7, [10–8]
Winner	4–1	7 August 2015	Dundalk, Ireland	G5	Carpet	(Republic of Ireland) Georgia Drummy	(United Kingdom) Eliz Maloney (Slovakia) Lenka Stará	6–3, 6–1
Runner-up	4–2	12 September 2015	Larnaca, Cyprus	G4	Hard	(Republic of Ireland) Georgia Drummy	(Sweden) Mirjam Björklund (Cyprus) Eliza Omirou	2–6, 5–7

== National representation ==
=== Fed Cup ===
Timotin made her Fed Cup debut for Ireland in 2016, while the team was competing in the Europe/Africa Zone Group III, when she was 16 years and 159 days old.

==== Fed Cup (6–5) ====
Group membership World Group (0–0) World Group Play-off (0–0) World Group II (0–0) World Group II Play-off (0–0) Europe/Africa Group (6–5)	Matches by surface Hard (0–0) Clay (6–5) Grass (0–0) Carpet (0–0)	Matches by type Singles (4–4) Doubles (2–1)	Matches by setting Indoors (0–0) Outdoors (6–5)

===== Singles (4–4) =====
Edition	Stage	Date	Location	Against	Surface	Opponent	W/L	Score
2016 Fed Cup; Europe/Africa Zone Group III	Pool B	12 April 2016	Ulcinj, Montenegro	Iceland	Clay	Anna Soffía Grönholm	W	6–3, 6–1
2016 Fed Cup; Europe/Africa Zone Group III	Pool B	13 April 2016	Ulcinj, Montenegro	(North Macedonia) Macedonia	Clay	Katarina Marinkovikj	W	6–3, 3–6, 6–1
2016 Fed Cup; Europe/Africa Zone Group III	Pool B	15 April 2016	Ulcinj, Montenegro	Armenia	Clay	Ani Amiraghyan	L	3–6, 2–6
2016 Fed Cup; Europe/Africa Zone Group III	5th-8th Play-off	16 April 2016	Ulcinj, Montenegro	Montenegro	Clay	Ana Veselinović	L	1–6, 3–6
2017 Fed Cup; Europe/Africa Zone Group III	Pool B	13 June 2017	Chișinău, Moldova	Iceland	Clay	Hera Brynjarsdóttir	W	6–3, 7–6^{(7–3)}
2017 Fed Cup; Europe/Africa Zone Group III	Pool B	14 June 2017	Chișinău, Moldova	Kenya	Clay	Shufaa Changawa Ruwa	W	6–3, 6–2
2017 Fed Cup; Europe/Africa Zone Group III	Pool B	15 June 2017	Chișinău, Moldova	Cyprus	Clay	Eliza Omirou	L	3–6, 0–6
2017 Fed Cup; Europe/Africa Zone Group III	5th-8th Play-off	17 June 2017	Chișinău, Moldova	Morocco	Clay	Lina Qostal	L	6–7^{(5–7)}, 0–6

===== Doubles (2–1) =====
Edition	Stage	Date	Location	Against	Surface	Partner	Opponents	W/L	Score
2016 Fed Cup; Europe/Africa Zone Group III	Pool B	12 April 2016	Ulcinj, Montenegro	Iceland	Clay	Georgia Drummy	Hera Brynjarsdóttir; Anna Soffía Grönholm	W	4–6, 6–1, 6–2
2016 Fed Cup; Europe/Africa Zone Group III	Pool B	13 April 2016	Ulcinj, Montenegro	(North Macedonia) Macedonia	Clay	Georgia Drummy	Katarina Marinkovikj; Magdalena Stoilkovska	L	5–7, 6–4, 3–6
2016 Fed Cup; Europe/Africa Zone Group III	Pool B	15 April 2016	Ulcinj, Montenegro	Armenia	Clay	Georgia Drummy	Ani Amiraghyan; Lusine Chobanyan	W	4–6, 6–0, 6–4
