= 2021 Billie Jean King Cup Europe/Africa Zone Group III – Pool D =

Subsection of tennis competition

Pool D of the 2021 Billie Jean King Cup Europe/Africa Group III was one of six pools in the Europe/Africa Group III of the 2020–21 Billie Jean King Cup. Four teams competed in a round robin competition, with the top team and bottom teams proceeding to their respective section of the play-offs: the top team played for advancement to Group II.

== Standings ==
| | | IRL | ARM | ISL | GHA | RR; W–L | Set; W–L | Game; W–L | Standings |
| 4 | Ireland | | 3–0 | 3–0 | 3–0 | 9–0 | 18–0 (100%) | 108–21 (84%) | 1 |
| 10 | Armenia | 0–3 | | 3–0 | 3–0 | 6–3 | 12–13 (48%) | 90–59 (60%) | 2 |
| 14 | Iceland | 0–3 | 0–3 | | 2–1 | 2–7 | 4–14 (22%) | 49–93 (35%) | 3 |
| – | Ghana | 0–3 | 0–3 | 1–2 | | 1–8 | 3–16 (16%) | 28–102 (22%) | 4 |

Standings are determined by: 1. number of wins; 2. if two teams have the same number of wins, head-to-head record; 3. if three teams have the same number of wins, (a) number of matches won in the group, then (b) percentage of sets won in the group, then (c) percentage of games won in the group, then (d) Billie Jean King Cup rankings.

== Round robin ==
=== Ireland vs. Ghana ===
Ireland
3
SEB Arena, Vilnius, Lithuania
15 June 2021
Hard (indoor)

Ghana
0

| | | | 1 | 2 | 3 |
|---|---|---|---|---|---|
| 1 | (Republic of Ireland) (Ghana) | Celine Simunyu; Annette Cruickshank | 6; 0 | 6; 0 |
| 2 | (Republic of Ireland) (Ghana) | Anna Bowtell; Naa Shika Mckorley | 6; 2 | 6; 0 |
| 3 | (Republic of Ireland) (Ghana) | Sophia Derivan / Shauna Heffernan; Naa Anyema Mckorley / Nyanyuie Grace Tomegah | 6; 0 | 6; 0 |

=== Armenia vs. Iceland ===
Armenia
3
SEB Arena, Vilnius, Lithuania
15 June 2021
Hard (indoor)

Iceland
0

| | | | 1 | 2 | 3 |
|---|---|---|---|---|---|
| 1 | (Armenia) (Iceland) | Irene Muradyan; Hera Brynjarsdóttir | 6; 2 | 6; 0 |
| 2 | (Armenia) (Iceland) | Gabriella Akopyan; Sofia Sóley Jónasdóttir | 7; 5 | 6; 1 |
| 3 | (Armenia) (Iceland) | Milena Gevorgyan / Arevik Tumanyan; Hera Brynjarsdóttir / Anna Soffia Grönholm | 7^{7} 6^{5} | 6; 2 |

=== Ireland vs. Iceland ===
Ireland
3
SEB Arena, Vilnius, Lithuania
16 June 2021
Hard (indoor)

Iceland
0

| | | | 1 | 2 | 3 |
|---|---|---|---|---|---|
| 1 | (Republic of Ireland) (Iceland) | Celine Simunyu; Anna Soffia Grönholm | 6; 1 | 6; 2 |
| 2 | (Republic of Ireland) (Iceland) | Anna Bowtell; Sofia Sóley Jónasdóttir | 6; 2 | 6; 0 |
| 3 | (Republic of Ireland) (Iceland) | Sophia Derivan / Shauna Heffernan; Hera Brynjarsdóttir / Sofia Sóley Jónasdóttir | 6; 0 | 6; 1 |

=== Armenia vs. Ghana ===
Armenia
3
SEB Arena, Vilnius, Lithuania
16 June 2021
Hard (indoor)

Ghana
0

| | | | 1 | 2 | 3 |
|---|---|---|---|---|---|
| 1 | (Armenia) (Ghana) | Milena Gevorgyan; Nyanyuie Grace Tomegah | 3; 6 | 6; 0 | 6; 0 |
| 2 | (Armenia) (Ghana) | Irena Muradyan; Naa Shika Mckorley | 6; 0 | 6; 0 |
| 3 | (Armenia) (Ghana) | Gabriella Akopyan / Arevik Tumanyan; Annette Cruickshank / Naa Anyema Mckorley | 6; 1 | 6; 0 |

=== Ireland vs. Armenia ===
Ireland
3
SEB Arena, Vilnius, Lithuania
17 June 2021
Hard (indoor)

Armenia
0

| | | | 1 | 2 | 3 |
|---|---|---|---|---|---|
| 1 | (Republic of Ireland) (Armenia) | Celine Simunyu; Irena Muradyan | 6; 4 | 6; 2 |
| 2 | (Republic of Ireland) (Armenia) | Anna Bowtell; Gabriella Akopyan | 6; 1 | 6; 2 |
| 3 | (Republic of Ireland) (Armenia) | Sophia Derivan / Shauna Heffernan; Milena Gevorgyan / Arevik Tumanyan | 6; 2 | 6; 2 |

=== Ghana vs. Iceland ===
Ghana
1
SEB Arena, Vilnius, Lithuania
17 June 2021
Hard (indoor)

Iceland
2

| | | | 1 | 2 | 3 |
|---|---|---|---|---|---|
| 1 | (Ghana) (Iceland) | Nyanyuie Grace Tomegah; Anna Soffia Grönholm | 6; 2 | 6; 1 |
| 2 | (Ghana) (Iceland) | Naa Shika Mckorley; Sofia Sóley Jónasdóttir | 3; 6 | 1; 6 |
| 3 | (Ghana) (Iceland) | Naa Anyema Mckorley / Nyanyuie Grace Tomegah; Hera Brynjarsdóttir / Sofia Sóley Jónasdóttir | 1; 6 | 2; 6 |

== See also ==
- Billie Jean King Cup structure
