= 2016 Fed Cup Europe/Africa Zone Group III – Pool B =

International tennis competition

Pool B of the 2016 Fed Cup Europe/Africa Group III was one of four pools in the Europe/Africa Group III of the 2016 Fed Cup. Four teams competed in a round robin competition, with the top team and bottom teams proceeding to their respective sections of the play-offs: the top team played for advancement to Group II.

== Standings ==
| | | IRL | ARM | MKD | ISL | RR; W–L | Set; W–L | Game; W–L | Standings |
| 70 | Ireland | | 2–1 | 1–2 | 3–0 | 2–1 | 14–9 | 117–84 | 2 |
| 80 | Armenia | 1–2 | | 1–2 | 3–0 | 1–2 | 11–8 | 78–62 | 3 |
| 84 | Macedonia | 2–1 | 2–1 | | 3–0 | 3–0 | 15–6 | 105–63 | 1 |
| 99 | Iceland | 0–3 | 0–3 | 0–3 | | 0–3 | 1–18 | 28–112 | 4 |

== Round-robin ==
=== Ireland vs. Iceland ===
Ireland
3
Bellevue, Ulcinj, Montenegro
12 April 2016
Outdoor clay

Iceland
0

| | | | 1 | 2 | 3 |
|---|---|---|---|---|---|
| 1 | (Republic of Ireland) (Iceland) | Jennifer Timotin; Anna Soffia Gronholm | 6; 3 | 6; 1 |
| 2 | (Republic of Ireland) (Iceland) | Georgia Drummy; Hera Brynjarsdóttir | 6; 4 | 6; 1 |
| 3 | (Republic of Ireland) (Iceland) | Georgia Drummy / Jennifer Timotin; Hera Brynjarsdóttir / Anna Soffia Gronholm | 4; 6 | 6; 1 | 6; 2 |

=== Armenia vs. Macedonia ===
Armenia
1
Bellevue, Ulcinj, Montenegro
12 April 2016
Outdoor clay

Macedonia
2

| | | | 1 | 2 | 3 |
|---|---|---|---|---|---|
| 1 | (Armenia) (North Macedonia) | Lusine Chobanyan; Katarina Marinkovikj | 3; 6 | 0; 6 |
| 2 | (Armenia) (North Macedonia) | Ani Amiraghyan; Magdalena Stoilkovska | 6; 0 | 6; 2 |
| 3 | (Armenia) (North Macedonia) | Ani Amiraghyan / Ani Safaryan; Katarina Marinkovikj / Magdalena Stoilkovska | 2; 6 | 2; 6 |

=== Ireland vs. Macedonia ===
Ireland
1
Bellevue, Ulcinj, Montenegro
13 April 2016
Outdoor clay

Macedonia
2

| | | | 1 | 2 | 3 |
|---|---|---|---|---|---|
| 1 | (Republic of Ireland) (North Macedonia) | Jennifer Timotin; Katarina Marinkovikj | 6; 3 | 3; 6 | 6; 1 |
| 2 | (Republic of Ireland) (North Macedonia) | Georgia Drummy; Magdalena Stoilkovska | 6; 3 | 5; 7 | 4; 6 |
| 3 | (Republic of Ireland) (North Macedonia) | Georgia Drummy / Jennifer Timotin; Katarina Marinkovikj / Magdalena Stoilkovska | 5; 7 | 6; 4 | 3; 6 |

=== Armenia vs. Iceland ===
Armenia
3
Bellevue, Ulcinj, Montenegro
13 April 2016
Outdoor clay

Iceland
0

| | | | 1 | 2 | 3 |
|---|---|---|---|---|---|
| 1 | (Armenia) (Iceland) | Lusine Chobanyan; Anna Soffia Gronholm | 6; 1 | 6; 1 |
| 2 | (Armenia) (Iceland) | Ani Amiraghyan; Hera Brynjarsdóttir | 6; 0 | 6; 0 |
| 3 | (Armenia) (Iceland) | Ani Amiraghyan / Lusine Chobanyan; Hera Brynjarsdóttir / Anna Soffia Gronholm | 6; 0 | 6; 1 |

=== Ireland vs. Armenia ===
Ireland
2
Bellevue, Ulcinj, Montenegro
15 April 2016
Outdoor clay

Armenia
1

| | | | 1 | 2 | 3 |
|---|---|---|---|---|---|
| 1 | (Republic of Ireland) (Armenia) | Anna Bowtell; Ani Safaryan | 6; 1 | 6; 0 |
| 2 | (Republic of Ireland) (Armenia) | Jennifer Timotin; Ani Amiraghyan | 3; 6 | 2; 6 |
| 3 | (Republic of Ireland) (Armenia) | Georgia Drummy / Jennifer Timotin; Ani Amiraghyan / Lusine Chobanyan | 4; 6 | 6; 0 | 6; 4 |

=== Macedonia vs. Iceland ===
Macedonia
3
Bellevue, Ulcinj, Montenegro
15 April 2016
Outdoor clay

Iceland
0

| | | | 1 | 2 | 3 |
|---|---|---|---|---|---|
| 1 | (North Macedonia) (Iceland) | Elena Jankulovska; Anna Soffia Gronholm | 6; 0 | 6; 1 |
| 2 | (North Macedonia) (Iceland) | Nora Hristovska; Hera Brynjarsdóttir | 6; 0 | 6; 2 |
| 3 | (North Macedonia) (Iceland) | Nora Hristovska / Elena Jankulovska; Hera Brynjardóttir / Anna Soffia Gronholm | 6; 1 | 6; 3 |

== See also ==
- Fed Cup structure
