= 2021 Billie Jean King Cup Europe/Africa Zone Group III – Pool F =

Subsection of tennis competition

Pool F of the 2021 Billie Jean King Cup Europe/Africa Group III was one of six pools in the Europe/Africa Group III of the 2020–21 Billie Jean King Cup. Four teams competed in a round robin competition, with the top team and bottom teams proceeding to their respective section of the play-offs: the top team played for advancement to Group II.

== Standings ==
		RSA	MNE	AZE	NAM	RR; W–L	Set; W–L	Game; W–L	Standings
6	South Africa		3–0	3–0	3–0	9–0	18–0 (100%)	109–14 (89%)	1
11	Montenegro	0–3		3–0	2–1	5–4	11–9 (55%)	87–72 (55%)	2
–	Azerbaijan	0–3	0–3		3–0	3–6	7–13 (35%)	63–105 (38%)	3
–	Namibia	0–3	1–2	0–3		1–8	3–17 (15%)	49–117 (30%)	4

Standings are determined by: 1. number of wins; 2. if two teams have the same number of wins, head-to-head record; 3. if three teams have the same number of wins, (a) number of matches won in the group, then (b) percentage of sets won in the group, then (c) percentage of games won in the group, then (d) Billie Jean King Cup rankings.

== Round robin ==
=== South Africa vs. Namibia ===
South Africa
3
SEB Arena, Vilnius, Lithuania
15 June 2021
Hard (indoor)

Namibia
0

			1	2	3
1	(South Africa) (Namibia)	Delien Kleinhans; Carita Moolman	6; 1	6; 0
2	(South Africa) (Namibia)	Chanel Simmonds; Georgina Moolman	6; 0	6; 1
3	(South Africa) (Namibia)	Chanel Simmonds / Lara Van Der Merwe; Georgina Moolman / Liniques Theron	6; 0	6; 1

=== Montenegro vs. Azerbaijan ===
Montenegro
3
SEB Arena, Vilnius, Lithuania
15 June 2021
Hard (indoor)

Azerbaijan
0

			1	2	3
1	(Montenegro) (Azerbaijan)	Tea Nikčević; Zuleykha Safarova	6; 1	6; 3
2	(Montenegro) (Azerbaijan)	Divna Ratković; Umayra Hashimova	6; 1	6; 4
3	(Montenegro) (Azerbaijan)	Petra Mirković / Divna Ratković; Alina Gavrish / Alina Guseynova	6; 0	6^{5} 7^{7}	6; 0

=== South Africa vs. Azerbaijan ===
South Africa
3
SEB Arena, Vilnius, Lithuania
16 June 2021
Hard (indoor)

Azerbaijan
0

			1	2	3
1	(South Africa) (Azerbaijan)	Lara Van Der Merwe; Alina Gavrish	6; 1	6; 2
2	(South Africa) (Azerbaijan)	Chanel Simmonds; Umayra Hashimova	6; 1	6; 0
3	(South Africa) (Azerbaijan)	Delien Kleinhans / Lara Van Der Merwe; Alina Guseynova / Zuleykha Safarova	6; 0	6; 0

=== Montenegro vs. Namibia ===
Montenegro
2
SEB Arena, Vilnius, Lithuania
16 June 2021
Hard (indoor)

Namibia
1

			1	2	3
1	(Montenegro) (Namibia)	Tea Nikčević; Taimi Nashiku	6; 1	6; 1
2	(Montenegro) (Namibia)	Divna Ratković; Georgina Moolman	6; 3	6; 0
3	(Montenegro) (Namibia)	Petra Mirković / Divna Ratković; Carita Moolman / Liniques Theron	2; 6	6; 1	6^{1} 7^{7}

=== South Africa vs. Montenegro ===
South Africa
3
SEB Arena, Vilnius, Lithuania
17 June 2021
Hard (indoor)

Montenegro
0

			1	2	3
1	(South Africa) (Montenegro)	Delien Kleinhans; Tea Nikčević	7; 5	6; 1
2	(South Africa) (Montenegro)	Chanel Simmonds; Divna Ratković	6; 1	6; 0
3	(South Africa) (Montenegro)	Delien Kleinhans / Lara Van Der Merwe; Petra Mirković / Divna Ratković	6; 0	6; 0

=== Namibia vs. Azerbaijan ===
Namibia
0
SEB Arena, Vilnius, Lithuania
17 June 2021
Hard (indoor)

Azerbaijan
3

			1	2	3
1	(Namibia) (Azerbaijan)	Taimi Nashiku; Alina Gavrish	3; 6	6; 4	1; 6
2	(Namibia) (Azerbaijan)	Georgina Moolman; Umayra Hashimova	1; 6	6^{2} 7^{7}
3	(Namibia) (Azerbaijan)	Carita Moolman / Liniques Theron; Umayra Hashimova / Zuleykha Safarova	5; 7	5; 7

== See also ==
- Billie Jean King Cup structure
