= 2021 Billie Jean King Cup Europe/Africa Zone Group III – Pool A =

Subsection of tennis competition

Pool A of the 2021 Billie Jean King Cup Europe/Africa Group III was one of six pools in the Europe/Africa Group III of the 2020–21 Billie Jean King Cup. Three teams competed in a round robin competition, with the top team and bottom teams proceeding to their respective section of the play-offs: the top team played for advancement to Group II.

== Standings ==
		NOR	MKD	ALB	RR; W–L	Set; W–L	Game; W–L	Standings
1	Norway		3–0	3–0	6–0	12–0 (100%)	72–4 (95%)	1
9	North Macedonia	0–3		2–1	2–4	4–8 (33%)	34–58 (37%)	2
–	Albania	0–3	1–2		1–5	2–10 (17%)	23–67 (26%)	3

Standings are determined by: 1. number of wins; 2. if two teams have the same number of wins, head-to-head record; 3. if three teams have the same number of wins, (a) number of matches won in the group, then (b) percentage of sets won in the group, then (c) percentage of games won in the group, then (d) Billie Jean King Cup rankings.

== Round robin ==
=== Norway vs. Albania ===
Norway
3
SEB Arena, Vilnius, Lithuania
15 June 2021
Hard (indoor)

Albania
0

			1	2	3
1	(Norway) (Albania)	Malene Helgø; Kristal Dule	6; 0	6; 1
2	(Norway) (Albania)	Ulrikke Eikeri; Gresi Bajri	6; 0	6; 0
3	(Norway) (Albania)	Ulrikke Eikeri / Malene Helgø; Brunilda Mrruku / Rea Qinami	6; 0	6; 0

=== North Macedonia vs. Albania ===
North Macedonia
2
SEB Arena, Vilnius, Lithuania
16 June 2021
Hard (indoor)

Albania
1

			1	2	3
1	(North Macedonia) (Albania)	Katarina Marinkovikj; Kristal Dule	3; 6	3; 6
2	(North Macedonia) (Albania)	Aleksandra Simeva; Gresi Bajri	7^{7} 6^{2}	6; 3
3	(North Macedonia) (Albania)	Katarina Marinkovikj / Aleksandra Simeva; Gresi Bajri / Kristal Dule	6; 1	6; 0

=== Norway vs. North Macedonia ===
Norway
3
SEB Arena, Vilnius, Lithuania
17 June 2021
Hard (indoor)

North Macedonia
0

			1	2	3
1	(Norway) (North Macedonia)	Malene Helgø; Katarina Marinkovikj	6; 0	6; 0
2	(Norway) (North Macedonia)	Ulrikke Eikeri; Aleksandra Simeva	6; 1	6; 0
3	(Norway) (North Macedonia)	Ulrikke Eikeri / Malene Helgø; Katarina Marinkovikj / Aleksandra Simeva	6; 2	6; 0

== See also ==
- Billie Jean King Cup structure
