= 2021 Billie Jean King Cup Europe/Africa Zone Group III – Pool E =

Subsection of tennis competition

Pool E of the 2021 Billie Jean King Cup Europe/Africa Group III was one of six pools in the Europe/Africa Group III of the 2020–21 Billie Jean King Cup. Four teams competed in a round robin competition, with the top team and bottom teams proceeding to their respective section of the play-offs: the top team played for advancement to Group II.

== Standings ==
		MLT	ALG	ZIM	KEN	RR; W–L	Set; W–L	Game; W–L	Standings
5	Malta		3–0	2–1	3–0	8–1	16–3 (84%)	106–49 (68%)	1
8	Algeria	0–3		2–1	3–0	5–4	11–9 (55%)	95–75 (56%)	2
–	Zimbabwe	1–2	1–2		3–0	5–4	10–8 (56%)	75–68 (52%)	3
13	Kenya	0–3	0–3	0–3		0–9	1–18 (5%)	28–112 (20%)	4

Standings are determined by: 1. number of wins; 2. if two teams have the same number of wins, head-to-head record; 3. if three teams have the same number of wins, (a) number of matches won in the group, then (b) percentage of sets won in the group, then (c) percentage of games won in the group, then (d) Billie Jean King Cup rankings.

== Round robin ==
=== Malta vs. Kenya ===
Malta
3
SEB Arena, Vilnius, Lithuania
15 June 2021
Hard (indoor)

Kenya
0

			1	2	3
1	(Malta) (Kenya)	Francesca Curmi; Alicia Owegi	6; 0	6; 0
2	(Malta) (Kenya)	Helene Pellicano; Cynthia Wanjala	6; 2	6; 0
3	(Malta) (Kenya)	Francesca Curmi / Elaine Genovese; Roselida Asumwa / Alicia Owegi	6; 0	6; 2

=== Algeria vs. Zimbabwe ===
Algeria
2
SEB Arena, Vilnius, Lithuania
15 June 2021
Hard (indoor)

Zimbabwe
1

			1	2	3
1	(Algeria) (Zimbabwe)	Inès Bekrar; Tadiwanashe Eunice Mauchi	6; 2	6; 2
2	(Algeria) (Zimbabwe)	Lynda Benkaddour; Tanyaradzwa Midzi	3; 6	4; 6
3	(Algeria) (Zimbabwe)	Inès Bekrar / Inès Ibbou; Tadiwanashe Eunice Mauchi / Tanyaradzwa Midzi	6; 2	6; 0

=== Malta vs. Zimbabwe ===
Malta
2
SEB Arena, Vilnius, Lithuania
16 June 2021
Hard (indoor)

Zimbabwe
1

			1	2	3
1	(Malta) (Zimbabwe)	Francesca Curmi; Tadiwanashe Eunice Mauchi	6; 1	6; 0
2	(Malta) (Zimbabwe)	Helene Pellicano; Valeria Bhunu	3; 6	3; 6
3	(Malta) (Zimbabwe)	Francesca Curmi / Elaine Genovese; Valeria Bhunu / Tadiwanashe Eunice Mauchi	7^{7} 6^{4}	6; 2

=== Algeria vs. Kenya ===
Algeria
3
SEB Arena, Vilnius, Lithuania
16 June 2021
Hard (indoor)

Kenya
0

			1	2	3
1	(Algeria) (Kenya)	Inès Bekrar; Alicia Owegi	6; 1	6; 3
2	(Algeria) (Kenya)	Yassamine Boudjadi; Cynthia Wanjala	4; 6	6; 0	6; 1
3	(Algeria) (Kenya)	Lynda Benkaddour / Yassamine Boudjadi; Roselida Asumwa / Alicia Owegi	6; 4	6; 3

=== Malta vs. Algeria ===
Malta
3
SEB Arena, Vilnius, Lithuania
17 June 2021
Hard (indoor)

Algeria
0

			1	2	3
1	(Malta) (Algeria)	Francesca Curmi; Inès Bekrar	6; 4	2; 6	6; 4
2	(Malta) (Algeria)	Helene Pellicano; Yassamine Boudjadi	6; 2	6; 2
3	(Malta) (Algeria)	Elaine Genovese / Helene Pellicano; Lynda Benkaddour / Inès Ibbou	7^{7} 6^{5}			retired

=== Kenya vs. Zimbabwe ===
Kenya
0
SEB Arena, Vilnius, Lithuania
17 June 2021
Hard (indoor)

Zimbabwe
3

			1	2	3
1	(Kenya) (Zimbabwe)	Alicia Owegi; Tanyaradzwa Midzi	2; 6	1; 6
2	(Kenya) (Zimbabwe)	Cynthia Wanjala; Valeria Bhunu	0; 6	2; 6
3	(Kenya) (Zimbabwe)	Roselida Asumwa / Cynthia Wanjala; Valeria Bhunu / Tadiwanashe Eunice Mauchi	1; 6	0; 6

== See also ==
- Billie Jean King Cup structure
