= 2020 Billie Jean King Cup Americas Zone Group I – Pool A =

Subsection of tennis competition

Pool A of the 2020 Billie Jean King Cup Americas Zone Group I was one of two pools in the Americas zone of the 2020–21 Billie Jean King Cup. Three teams competed in a round robin competition, with the top teams and the bottom team proceeding to their respective sections of the play-offs: the top teams played for advanced to the 2020 Billie Jean King Cup Play-offs.

== Standings ==
		PAR	COL	VEN	RR; W–L	Set; W–L	Game; W–L	Standings
1	Paraguay		2–1	3–0	5–1	10–4 (71%)	66–56 (54%)	1
4	Colombia	1–2		3–0	4–2	9–4 (69%)	67–43 (61%)	2
6	Venezuela	0–3	0–3		0–6	1–12 (8%)	40–74 (35%)	3

Standings are determined by: 1. number of wins; 2. number of matches; 3. in two-team ties, head-to-head records; 4. in three-team ties, (a) percentage of matches won (head-to-head records if two teams remain tied), then (b) percentage of sets won (head-to-head records if two teams remain tied), then (c) percentage of games won (head-to-head records if two teams remain tied), then (d) Billie Jean King Cup rankings.

== Round-robin ==
=== Colombia vs. Venezuela ===
Colombia
3
Club Palestino, Santiago, Chile
5 February 2020
Clay

Venezuela
0

			1	2	3
1	(Colombia) (Venezuela)	Emiliana Arango; Mary Victoria Cancini	6; 1	6; 2
2	(Colombia) (Venezuela)	Camila Osorio; Andrea Gámiz	7^{7} 6^{4}	6; 4
3	(Colombia) (Venezuela)	María Herazo González / Yuliana Lizarazo; Daniela Ramírez / Aymet Uzcátegui	6; 1	6; 0

=== Paraguay vs. Venezuela ===
Paraguay
3
Club Palestino, Santiago, Chile
6 February 2020
Clay

Venezuela
0

			1	2	3
1	(Paraguay) (Venezuela)	Lara Escauriza; Aymet Uzcátegui	7; 5	0; 6	6; 4
2	(Paraguay) (Venezuela)	Verónica Cepede Royg; Andrea Gámiz	6; 4	6; 3
3	(Paraguay) (Venezuela)	Verónica Cepede Royg / Lara Escauriza; Mary Victoria Cancini / Daniela Ramírez	6; 1	6; 3

=== Paraguay vs. Colombia ===
Paraguay
2
Club Palestino, Santiago, Chile
7 February 2020
Clay

Colombia
1

			1	2	3
1	(Paraguay) (Colombia)	Lara Escauriza; Emiliana Arango	2; 6	1; 6
2	(Paraguay) (Colombia)	Verónica Cepede Royg; Camila Osorio	6; 1	6; 3
3	(Paraguay) (Colombia)	Verónica Cepede Royg / Lara Escauriza; María Herazo González / Yuliana Lizarazo	2; 6	6; 4	6; 4
