= 2020 Billie Jean King Cup Americas Zone Group I – Pool B =

Subsection of tennis competition

Pool B of the 2020 Billie Jean King Cup Americas Zone Group I was one of two pools in the Americas zone of the 2020–21 Billie Jean King Cup. Four teams competed in a round robin competition, with the top teams and the bottom teams proceeding to their respective sections of the play-offs: the top teams played for advanced to the 2020 Billie Jean King Cup Play-offs.

== Standings ==
		ARG	MEX	CHI	PER	RR; W–L	Set; W–L	Game; W–L	Standings
2	Argentina		2–1	2–1	3–0	7–2	14–6 (70%)	103–68 (60%)	1
5	Mexico	1–2		2–1	3–0	6–3	13–7 (65%)	99–76 (57%)	2
3	Chile	1–2	1–2		3–0	2–7	11–8 (58%)	88–69 (56%)	3
7	Peru	0–3	0–3	0–3		0–9	1–18 (5%)	38–115 (25%)	4

Standings are determined by: 1. number of wins; 2. number of matches; 3. in two-team ties, head-to-head records; 4. in three-team ties, (a) percentage of matches won (head-to-head records if two teams remain tied), then (b) percentage of sets won (head-to-head records if two teams remain tied), then (c) percentage of games won (head-to-head records if two teams remain tied), then (d) Billie Jean King Cup rankings.

== Round-robin ==
=== Argentina vs. Mexico ===
Argentina
2
Club Palestino, Santiago, Chile
5 February 2020
Clay

Mexico
1

			1	2	3
1	(Argentina) (Mexico)	Nadia Podoroska; Fernanda Contreras Gómez	6; 2	6; 0
2	(Argentina) (Mexico)	Paula Ormaechea; Giuliana Olmos	3; 6	4; 6
3	(Argentina) (Mexico)	Paula Ormaechea / Nadia Podoroska; Fernanda Contreras Gómez / Giuliana Olmos	0; 6	7^{7} 6^{1}	6; 1

=== Chile vs. Peru ===
Chile
3
Club Palestino, Santiago, Chile
5 February 2020
Clay

Peru
0

			1	2	3
1	(Chile) (Peru)	Bárbara Gatica; Dana Guzmán	6; 1	6; 1
2	(Chile) (Peru)	Daniela Seguel; Romina Ccuno	6; 0	6; 0
3	(Chile) (Peru)	Bárbara Gatica / Alexa Guarachi; Romina Ccuno / Camila Soares	6; 2	6; 1

=== Argentina vs. Chile ===
Argentina
2
Club Palestino, Santiago, Chile
6 February 2020
Clay

Chile
1

			1	2	3
1	(Argentina) (Chile)	Nadia Podoroska; Bárbara Gatica	6; 2	6; 3
2	(Argentina) (Chile)	Paula Ormaechea; Daniela Seguel	6; 3	6; 3
3	(Argentina) (Chile)	Victoria Bosio / Guillermina Naya; Bárbara Gatica / Alexa Guarachi	2; 6	4; 6

=== Mexico vs. Peru ===
Mexico
3
Club Palestino, Santiago, Chile
6 February 2020
Clay

Peru
0

			1	2	3
1	(Mexico) (Peru)	Fernanda Contreras Gómez; Camila Soares	6; 0	6; 1
2	(Mexico) (Peru)	Giuliana Olmos; Romina Ccuno	7^{7} 6^{2}	7; 5
3	(Mexico) (Peru)	Fernanda Contreras Gómez / Giuliana Olmos; Dana Guzmán / Daianne Hayashida	6; 2	6; 1

=== Argentina vs. Peru ===
Argentina
3
Club Palestino, Santiago, Chile
7 February 2020
Clay

Peru
0

			1	2	3
1	(Argentina) (Peru)	Victoria Bosio; Daianne Hayashida	7; 5	6; 1
2	(Argentina) (Peru)	Paula Ormaechea; Romina Ccuno	6; 1	6; 1
3	(Argentina) (Peru)	María Lourdes Carlé / Guillermina Naya; Dana Guzmán / Camila Soares	6; 3	4; 6	6; 1

=== Chile vs. Mexico ===
Chile
1
Club Palestino, Santiago, Chile
7 February 2020
Clay

Mexico
2

			1	2	3
1	(Chile) (Mexico)	Bárbara Gatica; Fernanda Contreras Gómez	6; 4	3; 6	2; 6
2	(Chile) (Mexico)	Daniela Seguel; Giuliana Olmos	6; 2	6; 4
3	(Chile) (Mexico)	Bárbara Gatica / Alexa Guarachi; Fernanda Contreras Gómez / Giuliana Olmos	2; 6	4; 6
