= 2021 Billie Jean King Cup Americas Zone Group II – Pool A (Panama City) =

Subsection of tennis competition

Pool A (Panama City) of the 2021 Billie Jean King Cup Americas Group II was one of two pools in the Americas Group II of the 2020–21 Billie Jean King Cup. Three teams competed in a round robin competition, with the top team and bottom teams proceeding to their respective section of the play-offs: the top team played for advancement to Group I.

== Standings ==
		URU	BAH	CRC	RR; W–L	Set; W–L	Game; W–L	Standings
4	Uruguay		2–1	2–1	4–2	9–5 (64%)	71–51 (58%)	1
1	Bahamas	1–2		2–1	3–3	7–6 (54%)	54–55 (50%)	2
5	Costa Rica	1–2	1–2		2–4	4–9 (31%)	42–61 (41%)	3

Standings are determined by: 1. number of wins; 2. if two teams have the same number of wins, head-to-head record; 3. if three teams have the same number of wins, (a) number of matches won in the group, then (b) percentage of sets won in the group, then (c) percentage of games won in the group, then (d) Billie Jean King Cup rankings.

== Round robin ==
=== Bahamas vs. Costa Rica ===
Bahamas
2
Centro de Alto Rendimiento Fred Maduro, Panama City, Panama
23 June 2021
Clay

Costa Rica
1

			1	2	3
1	(The Bahamas) (Costa Rica)	Sydney Clarke; Sofía Pérez	6; 0	6; 2
2	(The Bahamas) (Costa Rica)	Kerrie Cartwright; Ariana Rahmanparast	6; 3	6; 3
3	(The Bahamas) (Costa Rica)	Sierra Donaldson / Elana Mackey; Sofía Pérez / Ariana Rahmanparast	0; 6	1; 6

=== Uruguay vs. Costa Rica ===
Uruguay
2
Centro de Alto Rendimiento Fred Maduro, Panama City, Panama
24 June 2021
Clay

Costa Rica
1

			1	2	3
1	(Uruguay) (Costa Rica)	Juliana Rodríguez; Sofía Pérez	6; 1	4; 6	2; 6
2	(Uruguay) (Costa Rica)	Guillermina Grant; Ariana Rahmanparast	6; 3	6; 2
3	(Uruguay) (Costa Rica)	Guillermina Grant / Juliana Rodríguez; Sofía Pérez / Ariana Rahmanparast	6; 2	6; 2

=== Bahamas vs. Uruguay ===
Bahamas
1
Centro de Alto Rendimiento Fred Maduro, Panama City, Panama
25 June 2021
Clay

Uruguay
2

			1	2	3
1	(The Bahamas) (Uruguay)	Sydney Clarke; Guillermina Grant	2; 6	3; 6
2	(The Bahamas) (Uruguay)	Kerrie Cartwright; Isabella Tiscornia	7^{7} 6^{5}	6; 2
3	(The Bahamas) (Uruguay)	Kerrie Cartwright / Sydney Clarke; Guillermina Grant / Juliana Rodríguez	6; 3	3; 6	2; 6

== See also ==
- Billie Jean King Cup structure
