= Georgia Drummy =

Irish tennis player

- Country (sports): Ireland
- Residence: Dublin, Ireland
- Born: 18 April 2000 (age 26) Dublin
- Height: 1.78 m (5 ft 10 in)
- Plays: Left (two-handed backhand)
- Prize money: US$ 6,628

Singles
- Career record: 17–3
- Career titles: 2 ITF
- Highest ranking: No. 795 (12 August 2019)

Grand Slam singles results
- Australian Open Junior: 1R (2016)
- French Open Junior: 1R (2018)
- Wimbledon Junior: 1R (2018)
- US Open Junior: 2R (2018)

Doubles
- Career record: 10–5
- Highest ranking: No. 983 (12 August 2019)

Grand Slam doubles results
- Australian Open Junior: 1R (2016)
- French Open Junior: 2R (2018)
- Wimbledon Junior: QF (2018)
- US Open Junior: 1R (2018)

Team competitions
- Fed Cup: 3–2

Georgia Drummy (born 18 April 2000) is an Irish former tennis player.

She has a career-high singles ranking by the WTA of 795, achieved on 12 August 2019. In her career, she won two singles titles on tournaments of the ITF Women's Circuit.

Drummy has represented Ireland in the Fed Cup, where she has a win–loss record of 3–2.

On the junior tour, she reached a career-high combined ranking of 35, on 15 October 2018.

== ITF Circuit finals ==
Legend
$100,000 tournaments
$80,000 tournaments
$60,000 tournaments
$25,000 tournaments
$15,000 tournaments

=== Singles: 3 (2 titles, 1 runner–up) ===
Result	W–L	Date	Tournament	Tier	Surface	Opponent	Score
Win	1–0	Jun 2019	ITF Amarante, Portugal	15,000	Hard	(Lithuania) Justina Mikulskytė	7–6^{(7–4)}, 6–3
Win	2–0	Aug 2019	ITF Dublin, Ireland	15,000	Carpet	(France) Alice Robbe	6–1, 6–2
Loss	2–1	Jul 2021	ITF Almada, Portugal	15,000	Hard	(United States) Alexa Graham	1–6, 2–6

=== Doubles: 3 (3 runner-ups) ===
Result	W–L	Date	Tournament	Tier	Surface	Partner	Opponents	Score
Loss	0–1	Jun 2019	ITF Amarante, Portugal	15,000	Hard	(United States) Christina Rosca	(Portugal) Francisca Jorge (Spain) Olga Parres Azcoitia	4–6, 6–2, [10–12]
Loss	0–2	Jul 2019	ITF Don Benito, Spain	15,000	Carpet	(Czech Republic) Karolína Beránková	(Spain) Alba Carrillo Marin (United Kingdom) Emilie Lindh	4–6, 5–7
Loss	0–3	Aug 2019	ITF Dublin, Ireland	15,000	Carpet	(Czech Republic) Karolína Beránková	(Germany) Lisa Ponomar (Romania) Karola Patricia Bejenaru	0–6, 4–6

== ITF Junior finals ==
Legend
Category GA
Category G1
Category G2
Category G3
Category G4
Category G5

=== Singles (6–3) ===
Outcome	W–L	Date	Tournament	Grade	Surface	Opponent	Score
Winner	1–0	Aug 2014	Belfast, Great Britain	G5	Carpet	(Republic of Ireland) Lauren Deegan	6–0, 6–3
Winner	2–0	Jun 2015	Mahdia, Tunisia	G4	Hard	(Latvia) Daniela Vismane	w/o
Winner	3–0	Jul 2015	Belfast, Great Britain	G5	Carpet	(Republic of Ireland) Jennifer Timotin	6–4, 6–2
Winner	4–0	Aug 2015	Dundalk, Ireland	G5	Carpet	(Republic of Ireland) Jennifer Timotin	6–4, 6–1
Runner-up	4–1	Nov 2015	Saint-Cyprien, France	G3	Hard (i)	(Netherlands) Nina Kruijer	6–7^{(1–7)}, 0–6
Winner	5–1	Oct 2016	Willemstad, Curaçao	G5	Hard	(Turkey) Yasemin Ada Boru	6–0, 6–2
Runner-up	5–2	May 2017	Villach, Austria	G2	Clay	(Germany) Lara Schmidt	4–6, 6–3, 3–6
Winner	6–2	Oct 2017	Córdoba, Argentina	G2	Clay	(Georgia (country)) Ana Makatsaria	7–5, 6–4
Runner-up	6–3	Apr 2018	Carson, United States	G1	Hard	(United States) Hurricane Tyra Black	7–6^{(8–6)}, 4–6, 1–6

=== Doubles (10–5) ===
Outcome	W–L	Date	Tournament	Grade	Surface	Partner	Opponents	Score
Winner	1–0	Aug 2014	Belfast, Great Britain	G5	Carpet	(Republic of Ireland) Jennifer Timotin	(Republic of Ireland) Annie McCullough (Republic of Ireland) Caitlin McCullough	6–2, 6–2
Winner	2–0	Apr 2015	Marsa, Malta	G4	Hard	(Switzerland) Simona Waltert	(United Kingdom) Joely Lomas (United Kingdom) Eden Richardson	6–7^{(4–7)}, 6–3, [10–6]
Winner	3–0	Apr 2015	Nottingham, Great Britain	G4	Hard	(Republic of Ireland) Jennifer Timotin	(United Kingdom) Holly Horsfall (United Kingdom) Elise van Heuvelen	6–3, 6–3
Runner-up	3–1	Jun 2015	Mahdia, Tunisia	G4	Hard	(Republic of Ireland) Jennifer Timotin	(Tunisia) Chiraz Bechri (Egypt) Farah Abdel-Wahab	6–1, 5–7, [8–10]
Winner	4–1	Jul 2015	Belfast, Great Britain	G5	Carpet	(Republic of Ireland) Jennifer Timotin	(United Kingdom) Maria Budin (United Kingdom) Megan Davies	6–4, 5–7, [10–8]
Winner	5–1	Aug 2015	Dundalk, Ireland	G5	Carpet	(Republic of Ireland) Jennifer Timotin	(United Kingdom) Eliz Maloney (Slovakia) Lenka Stará	6–3, 6–1
Runner-up	5–2	Sep 2015	Larnaca, Cyprus	G4	Hard	(Republic of Ireland) Jennifer Timotin	(Sweden) Mirjam Björklund (Cyprus) Eliza Omirou	2–6, 5–7
Winner	6–2	Nov 2016	Lexington, United States	G4	Hard	(United States) Victoria Flores	(United States) Chloe Beck (United States) Emma Navarro	6–3, 6–2
Winner	7–2	Nov 2016	Newport Beach, United States	G4	Hard	(China) Wu Meixu	(United States) Imani Graham (United States) Lauren Stein	6–3, 6–1
Runner-up	7–3	May 2017	Hódmezővásárhely, Hungary	G2	Clay	(United States) Katya Townsend	(Slovenia) Veronika Erjavec (Slovenia) Nika Radišič	1–6, 2–6
Winner	8–3	Jun 2017	Gladbeck, Germany	G2	Clay	(Ukraine) Margaryta Bilokin	(Bosnia and Herzegovina) Nefisa Berberović (Italy) Martina Biagianti	6–0, 6–1
Winner	9–3	Jul 2017	Castricum, Netherlands	G2	Clay	(Russia) Maria Tyrina	(France) Giulia Morlet (France) Diane Parry	6–2, 3–6, [10–6]
Runner-up	9–4	Oct 2017	Córdoba, Argentina	G2	Clay	(United States) Shelly Yaloz	(Netherlands) Julie Belgraver (Netherlands) Isabelle Haverlag	6–7^{(3–7)}, 4–6
Winner	10–4	Feb 2018	Cuenca, Ecuador	G1	Clay	(United States) Kacie Harvey	(Colombia) Laura Sofía Rico García (Colombia) Antonia Samudio	6–3, 6–0
Runner-up	10–5	Apr 2018	Carson, United States	G1	Hard	(Canada) Alexandra Vagramov	(United States) Natasha Subhash (United States) Katie Volynets	3–6, 3–6

== National representation ==
Drummy made her Fed Cup debut for Ireland in 2016, while the team was competing in the Europe/Africa Zone Group III, when she was only 15 years old.

=== Fed Cup ===
Group membership World Group World Group Play-off World Group II World Group II Play-off Europe/Africa Group (3–2)	Matches by surface Hard (0–0) Clay (3–2) Grass (0–0) Carpet (0–0)	Matches by type Singles (1–1) Doubles (2–1)	Matches by setting Indoors (0–0) Outdoors (3–2)

==== Singles (1–1) ====
Edition	Stage	Date	Location	Against	Surface	Opponent	W/L	Score
2016 Fed Cup; Europe/Africa Zone Group III	Pool B	12 April 2016	Ulcinj, Montenegro	Iceland	Clay	Hera Brynjarsdóttir	W	6–4, 6–1
2016 Fed Cup; Europe/Africa Zone Group III	Pool B	13 April 2016	Ulcinj, Montenegro	(North Macedonia) Macedonia	Clay	Magdalena Stoilkovska	L	6–3, 5–7, 4–6

==== Doubles (2–1) ====
Edition	Stage	Date	Location	Against	Surface	Partner	Opponents	W/L	Score
2016 Fed Cup; Europe/Africa Zone; Group III	Pool B	12 April 2016	Ulcinj, Montenegro	Iceland	Clay	Jennifer Timotin	Hera Brynjarsdóttir; Anna Soffía Grönholm	W	4–6, 6–1, 6–2
2016 Fed Cup; Europe/Africa Zone; Group III	Pool B	13 April 2016	Ulcinj, Montenegro	(North Macedonia) Macedonia	Clay	Jennifer Timotin	Katarina Marinkovikj; Magdalena Stoilkovska	L	5–7, 6–4, 3–6
2016 Fed Cup; Europe/Africa Zone; Group III	Pool B	15 April 2016	Ulcinj, Montenegro	Armenia	Clay	Jennifer Timotin	Ani Amiraghyan; Lusine Chobanyan	W	4–6, 6–0, 6–4
