= 2021 Billie Jean King Cup Americas Zone Group II – Pool B (Panama City) =

Subsection of tennis competition

Pool B (Panama City) of the 2021 Billie Jean King Cup Americas Group II was one of two pools in the Americas Group II of the 2020–21 Billie Jean King Cup. Four teams competed in a round robin competition, with the top team and bottom teams proceeding to their respective section of the play-offs: the top team played for advancement to Group I.

== Standings ==
		ECU	ESA	CUB	PAN	RR; W–L	Set; W–L	Game; W–L	Standings
2	Ecuador		3–0	3–0	3–0	9–0	18–0 (100%)	109–28 (80%)	1
7	El Salvador	0–3		2–1	2–1	4–5	9–10 (47%)	77–79 (49%)	2
3	Cuba	0–3	1–2		2–1	3–6	6–13 (32%)	65–96 (40%)	3
6	Panama	0–3	1–2	1–2		2–7	5–15 (25%)	58–106 (35%)	4

Standings are determined by: 1. number of wins; 2. if two teams have the same number of wins, head-to-head record; 3. if three teams have the same number of wins, (a) number of matches won in the group, then (b) percentage of sets won in the group, then (c) percentage of games won in the group, then (d) Billie Jean King Cup rankings.

== Round robin ==
=== Ecuador vs. El Salvador ===
Ecuador
3
Centro de Alto Rendimiento Fred Maduro, Panama City, Panama
23 June 2021
Clay

El Salvador
0

			1	2	3
1	(Ecuador) (El Salvador)	Charlotte Römer; Matia Cristiani	6; 2	6; 2
2	(Ecuador) (El Salvador)	Mell Reasco; Sara Valentina Cruz Bonilla	6; 1	6; 1
3	(Ecuador) (El Salvador)	Marie Elise Casares / Camila Romero; Matia Cristiani / Sara Valentina Cruz Bonilla	6; 1	6; 4

=== Cuba vs. Panama ===
Cuba
2
Centro de Alto Rendimiento Fred Maduro, Panama City, Panama
23 June 2021
Clay

Panama
1

			1	2	3
1	(Cuba) (Panama)	Roxana Valdez; Karen Esther Contreras	6; 2	7^{7} 6^{5}
2	(Cuba) (Panama)	Yusleydis Smith Dias; Zulay Castañeda	3; 6	6; 4	6; 0
3	(Cuba) (Panama)	Sachely Carrera / Roxana Valdez; Zulay Castañeda / Roasline Zafir Chávez Tello	4; 6	1; 6

=== Ecuador vs. Panama ===
Ecuador
3
Centro de Alto Rendimiento Fred Maduro, Panama City, Panama
24 June 2021
Clay

Panama
0

			1	2	3
1	(Ecuador) (Panama)	Camila Romero; Karen Esther Contreras	6; 1	6; 0
2	(Ecuador) (Panama)	Mell Reasco; Zulay Castañeda	6; 1	6; 0
3	(Ecuador) (Panama)	Marie Elise Casares / Charlotte Römer; Zulay Castañeda / Rosaline Zafir Chávez Tello	6; 3	6; 2

=== Cuba vs. El Salvador ===
Cuba
1
Centro de Alto Rendimiento Fred Maduro, Panama City, Panama
24 June 2021
Clay

El Salvador
2

			1	2	3
1	(Cuba) (El Salvador)	Roxana Valdez; Matia Cristiani	1; 6	1; 6
2	(Cuba) (El Salvador)	Yusleydis Smith Dias; Sara Valentina Cruz Bonilla	6; 0	6; 4
3	(Cuba) (El Salvador)	Yusleydis Smith Dias / Roxana Valdez; Matia Cristiani / Sara Valentina Cruz Bonilla	6^{2} 7^{7}	2; 6

=== Ecuador vs. Cuba ===
Ecuador
3
Centro de Alto Rendimiento Fred Maduro, Panama City, Panama
25 June 2021
Clay

Cuba
0

			1	2	3
1	(Ecuador) (Cuba)	Camila Romero; Roxana Valdez	6; 1	6; 0
2	(Ecuador) (Cuba)	Mell Reasco; Yusleydis Smith Dias	7; 5			retired
3	(Ecuador) (Cuba)	Tania Isabel Andrade Sabando / Charlotte Römer; Sachely Carrera / Roxana Valdez	6; 2	6; 2

=== Panama vs. El Salvador ===
Panama
1
Centro de Alto Rendimiento Fred Maduro, Panama City, Panama
25 June 2021
Clay

El Salvador
2

			1	2	3
1	(Panama) (El Salvador)	Rosaline Zafir Chávez Tello; Matia Cristiani	2; 6	2; 6
2	(Panama) (El Salvador)	Zulay Castañeda; Sara Valentina Cruz Bonilla	2; 6	6; 3	6; 4
3	(Panama) (El Salvador)	Zulay Castañeda / Karen Esther Contreras; Matia Cristiani / Sara Valentina Cruz Bonilla	1; 6	2; 6

== See also ==
- Billie Jean King Cup structure
