= 2021 Billie Jean King Cup Americas Zone Group II – Pool B (La Paz) =

Subsection of tennis competition

Pool B (La Paz) of the 2021 Billie Jean King Cup Americas Group II was one of two pools in the Americas Group II of the 2020–21 Billie Jean King Cup. Four teams competed in a round robin competition, with the top team and bottom teams proceeding to their respective section of the play-offs: the top team played for advancement to Group I.

== Standings ==
		BOL	HON	PUR	BAR	RR; W–L	Set; W–L	Game; W–L	Standings
2	Bolivia		3–0	3–0	3–0	9–0	18–1 (95%)	113–43 (72%)	1
5	Honduras	0–3		2–1	3–0	5–4	11–8 (58%)	84–80 (51%)	2
4	Puerto Rico	0–3	1–2		3–0	4–5	9–14 (39%)	96–114 (46%)	3
7	Barbados	0–3	0–3	0–3		0–9	3–18 (14%)	63–119 (35%)	4

Standings are determined by: 1. number of wins; 2. if two teams have the same number of wins, head-to-head record; 3. if three teams have the same number of wins, (a) number of matches won in the group, then (b) percentage of sets won in the group, then (c) percentage of games won in the group, then (d) Billie Jean King Cup rankings.

== Round robin ==
=== Bolivia vs. Barbados ===
Bolivia
3
Club de Tenis La Paz, La Paz, Bolivia
27 October 2021
Clay

Barbados
0

			1	2	3
1	(Bolivia) (Barbados)	Gabriela Cortés Flores; Gabrielle Leslie	6; 1	6; 2
2	(Bolivia) (Barbados)	Noelia Zeballos; Hannah Chambers	6; 2	6; 1
3	(Bolivia) (Barbados)	Fiorella Durán Montaño / Noelia Zeballos; Serena Bryan / Hannah Chambers	6; 4	6; 1

=== Puerto Rico vs. Honduras ===
Puerto Rico
1
Club de Tenis La Paz, La Paz, Bolivia
27 October 2021
Clay

Honduras
2

			1	2	3
1	(Puerto Rico) (Honduras)	Julieanne Bou; Daniela Obando	6; 2	2; 6	6; 2
2	(Puerto Rico) (Honduras)	Paola Bou; Natalie Gabriela Espinal Sánchez	4; 6	2; 6
3	(Puerto Rico) (Honduras)	Dakota Fordham / Natalia Pérez; Natalie Gabriela Espinal Sánchez / Daniela Obando	6^{8} 7^{10}	4; 6

=== Bolivia vs. Honduras ===
Bolivia
3
Club de Tenis La Paz, La Paz, Bolivia
28 October 2021
Clay

Honduras
0

			1	2	3
1	(Bolivia) (Honduras)	Gabriela Cortés Flores; Natalie Gabriela Espinal Sánchez	6; 4	6; 4
2	(Bolivia) (Honduras)	Noelia Zeballos; Alejandra Obando	6; 0	6; 0
3	(Bolivia) (Honduras)	Fiorella Durán Montaño / Noelia Zeballos; Daniela Obando / Ana Gabriela Zavala Mata	6; 2	6; 1

=== Puerto Rico vs. Barbados ===
Puerto Rico
3
Club de Tenis La Paz, La Paz, Bolivia
28 October 2021
Clay

Barbados
0

			1	2	3
1	(Puerto Rico) (Barbados)	Julieanne Bou; Gabrielle Leslie	6; 3	2; 6	6; 2
2	(Puerto Rico) (Barbados)	Paola Bou; Hannah Chambers	6; 4	2; 6	6; 4
3	(Puerto Rico) (Barbados)	Julieanne Bou / Natalia Pérez; Hannah Chambers / Gabrielle Leslie	7^{7} 6^{0}	4; 6	6; 1

=== Bolivia vs. Puerto Rico ===
Bolivia
3
Club de Tenis La Paz, La Paz, Bolivia
29 October 2021
Clay

Puerto Rico
0

			1	2	3
1	(Bolivia) (Puerto Rico)	Gabriela Cortés Flores; Julieanne Bou	6; 1	4; 6	7^{7} 6^{2}
2	(Bolivia) (Puerto Rico)	Noelia Zeballos; Paola Bou	6; 1	6; 1
3	(Bolivia) (Puerto Rico)	Fiorella Durán Montaño / Sofía Cristina Taborga Rollano; Paola Bou / Dakota Fordham	6; 4	6; 2

=== Honduras vs. Barbados ===
Honduras
3
Club de Tenis La Paz, La Paz, Bolivia
29 October 2021
Clay

Barbados
0

			1	2	3
1	(Honduras) (Barbados)	Daniela Obando; Serena Bryan	6; 2	6; 1
2	(Honduras) (Barbados)	Natalie Gabriela Espinal Sánchez; Gabrielle Leslie	7; 5	7^{7} 6^{3}
3	(Honduras) (Barbados)	Daniela Obando / Ana Gabriela Zavala Mata; Serena Bryan / Gabrielle Leslie				w/o

== See also ==
- Billie Jean King Cup structure
