= Rwanda Billie Jean King Cup team =

National tennis team

Rwanda
- Captain: Theoneste Karenzi
- Nations Ranking: 126 (13 November 2023)
- First year: 2021
- Years played: 2
- Ties played (W–L): 9 (3–6)
- Best finish: Zonal Group III RR
- Most total wins: Olive Tuyisenge (5–2)
- Most singles wins: Chantal Mutuyimana (2–1)
- Most doubles wins: Olive Tuyisenge (5–2)
- Most ties played: Olive Tuyisenge (6)
- Most years played: Olive Tuyisenge (2)

The Rwanda Billie Jean King Cup team represents Rwanda in Billie Jean King Cup tennis competition and are governed by the Rwanda Tennis Federation. They currently compete in the Europe/Africa Zone of Group IV.

== History ==
Rwanda competed in its first Billie Jean King Cup in 2021. Their best result was finishing fourth in their Group III pool in 2021.

== Current team ==
Rankings as of November 6, 2023

Players representing Rwanda in 2023
Name	Born	First	Last		Ties	Win/Loss			Ranks	
Name	Born	First	Year	Tie	Ties	Sin	Dou	Tot	Sin	Dou
Chantal Mutuyimana	April 14, 2000	2023	2023	Cameroon	4	2-1	0-1	2-2	—N/a	—N/a
Grace Gisubizo Ndahunga	December 23, 2002	2023	2023	Cameroon	1	0-0	0-1	0-1	—N/a	—N/a
Olive Tuyisenge	January 1, 1998	2021	2023	Cameroon	6	2-1	3-1	5-2	—N/a	—N/a
Sonia Tuyishime	June 16, 2002	2023	2023	Ethiopia	4	0-0	2-0	2-0	—N/a	—N/a
Giselle Umumararungu	September 24, 1995	2023	2023	Cameroon	5	2-2	3-0	5-2	—N/a	—N/a

== Results ==
Here is the list of all match-ups since 1995, when the competition started being held in the current World Group format.

Year	Competition	Date	Surface	Location	Opponent	Score	Result
2021	Europe/Africa Zone; Group III, Pool B	15 June	Hard (i)	Vilnius; Lithuania	Cyprus	3–0	Won
2021	Europe/Africa Zone; Group III, Pool B	16 June	Hard (i)	Vilnius; Lithuania	Bosnia and Herzegovina	1–2	Lost
2021	Europe/Africa Zone; Group III Play-Offs	18 June	Hard (i)	Vilnius; Lithuania	Zimbabwe	0–3	Lost
2021	Europe/Africa Zone; Group III Play-Offs	19 June	Hard (i)	Vilnius; Lithuania	Albania	3–0	Lost
2023	Europe/Africa Zone; Group IV Africa, Pool A	5 June	Clay	Kigali; Rwanda	Mozambique	3–0	Won
2023	Europe/Africa Zone; Group IV Africa, Pool A	6 June	Clay	Kigali; Rwanda	Tanzania	1–2	Lost
2023	Europe/Africa Zone; Group IV Africa, Pool A	8 June	Clay	Kigali; Rwanda	Angola	3–0	Won
2023	Europe/Africa Zone; Group IV Africa, Pool A	9 June	Clay	Kigali; Rwanda	Ethiopia	3–0	Won
2023	Europe/Africa Zone; Group IV Africa Play-Offs	10 June	Clay	Kigali; Rwanda	Cameroon	3–0	Lost

== See also ==
- Billie Jean King Cup
- Rwanda Davis Cup team
