= 2021 Billie Jean King Cup Americas Zone Group II – Pool A (La Paz) =

Subsection of tennis competition

Pool A (La Paz) of the 2021 Billie Jean King Cup Americas Group II was one of two pools in the Americas Group II of the 2020–21 Billie Jean King Cup. Three teams competed in a round robin competition, with the top team and bottom teams proceeding to their respective section of the play-offs: the top team played for advancement to Group I.

== Standings ==
		GUA	DOM	JAM	RR; W–L	Set; W–L	Game; W–L	Standings
1	Guatemala		3–0	3–0	6–0	12–1 (92%)	76–29 (72%)	1
3	Dominican Republic	0–3		3–0	3–3	7–6 (54%)	56–44 (56%)	2
6	Jamaica	0–3	0–3		0–3	0–12 (0%)	13–72 (15%)	3

Standings are determined by: 1. number of wins; 2. if two teams have the same number of wins, head-to-head record; 3. if three teams have the same number of wins, (a) number of matches won in the group, then (b) percentage of sets won in the group, then (c) percentage of games won in the group, then (d) Billie Jean King Cup rankings.

== Round robin ==
=== Guatemala vs. Jamaica ===
Guatemala
3
Club de Tenis La Paz, La Paz, Bolivia
27 October 2021
Clay

Jamaica
0

			1	2	3
1	(Guatemala) (Jamaica)	Melissa Morales; Katherine Dibbs	6; 0	6; 2
2	(Guatemala) (Jamaica)	Kirsten-Andrea Weedon; Junmoke James	6; 3	6; 2
3	(Guatemala) (Jamaica)	Melissa Morales / Gabriela Rivera; Katherine Dibbs / Shea-Ann Kameka	6; 1	6; 1

=== Dominican Republic vs. Jamaica ===
Dominican Republic
3
Club de Tenis La Paz, La Paz, Bolivia
28 October 2021
Clay

Jamaica
0

			1	2	3
1	(Dominican Republic) (Jamaica)	María Gell; Katherine Dibbs	6; 0	6; 0
2	(Dominican Republic) (Jamaica)	Kelly Williford; Junmoke James	6; 0	6; 2
3	(Dominican Republic) (Jamaica)	María Gell / Kelly Williford; Pauline Hylton / Junmoke James	6; 1	6; 1

=== Guatemala vs. Dominican Republic ===
Guatemala
3
Club de Tenis La Paz, La Paz, Bolivia
29 October 2021
Clay

Dominican Republic
0

			1	2	3
1	(Guatemala) (Dominican Republic)	Gabriela Rivera; María Castaño	6; 1	6; 1
2	(Guatemala) (Dominican Republic)	Melissa Morales; Kelly Williford	2; 6	7; 5	7^{7} 6^{5}
3	(Guatemala) (Dominican Republic)	Melissa Morales / Kirsten-Andrea Weedon; María Gell / Kelly Williford	6; 0	6; 1

== See also ==
- Billie Jean King Cup structure
