= Albania Billie Jean King Cup team =

Albanian women's tennis team

Albania
- Colors: red & black
- First year: 2021
- Years played: 1
- Ties played (W–L): 4 (1-3)
- Best finish: Zonal Group III RR
- Most total wins: Kristal Dule (1–2)
- Most singles wins: Kristal Dule (1–1)
- Most doubles wins: Gresi Bajri / Juna Dani (1 – 1)
- Best doubles team: Gresi Bajri (4)
- Most ties played: Kristal Dule, Gresi Bajri (2)
- Most years played: Brunilda Mrruku (1); Gresi Bajri (1); Juna Dani (1)

The Albania Billie Jean King Cup team represents Albania in Billie Jean King Cup tennis competition and are governed by the Albanian Tennis Federation. They currently compete in the Europe/Africa Zone of Group III.

== History ==
Albania competed in its first Billie Jean King Cup in 2021. Their best result was finishing third in their Group III pool in 2021.

== Players ==
| Player | W-L (Total) | W-L (Singles) | W-L (Doubles) | Ties | Debut | Ref |
|---|---|---|---|---|---|---|
| Gresi Bajri | 2–5 | 1–3 | 1–2 | 4 | 2021 | |
| Juna Dani | 1–1 | 0–0 | 1–1 | 2 | 2021 | |
| Kristal Dule | 3–2 | 3–1 | 0–1 | 4 | 2021 | |
| Brunilda Mrruku | 0–1 | 0–0 | 0–1 | 1 | 2021 | |
| Rea Qinami | 0–1 | 0–0 | 0–1 | 1 | 2021 | |

== Recent performances ==
Here is the list of all match-ups of the Albania participation in the Billie Jean King Cup in 2021.

^{(i)} = Played on an indoor court

| Year | Competition | Date | Surface | Venue | Opponent | Score | Result |
|---|---|---|---|---|---|---|---|
| 2021 | Europe/Africa Zone Group III, Pool A | 15 June | Hard (i) | SEB Arena, Vilnius (LTU) | Norway | 0–3 | Loss |
| 2021 | Europe/Africa Zone Group III, Pool A | 16 June | Hard (i) | SEB Arena, Vilnius (LTU) | North Macedonia | 1–2 | Loss |
| 2021 | Europe/Africa Zone Group III, Semifinals | 18 June | Hard (i) | SEB Arena, Vilnius (LTU) | Azerbaijan | 1–2 | Loss |
| 2021 | Europe/Africa Zone Group III, 17th place play-off | 19 June | Hard (i) | SEB Arena, Vilnius (LTU) | Rwanda | 3–0 | Win |

== See also ==
- Billie Jean King Cup
- Albania Davis Cup team
