= 2020–21 Billie Jean King Cup =

International women's tennis competition

Details
- Duration: 4 February 2020 – 6 November 2021
- Edition: 58th

Achievements (singles)

The 2020–21 Billie Jean King Cup was the 58th edition of the international women's tennis team's tournament and the first to be styled as the Billie Jean King Cup in honor of former World No. 1 Billie Jean King.

For this edition, the format of the cup was changed. The main modification is the World Group taking place at one location and in one week, with twelve teams divided in four round-robin groups of three teams each, with the winners of each group advancing to the semi-finals. The series between the teams in this stage featured two singles matches and one doubles match. As the World Group takes place as one single tournament, the event has been named the Billie Jean King Cup Finals. The lower zone groups I, II and III were composed of round-robin group play deciding promotion or relegation.

This edition was played over two years because of the COVID-19 pandemic: The Finals were originally scheduled to be held 17 to 18 April 2020 but were postponed to the following year and finally took place in November 2021.

Albania, Ghana, Guam, Mongolia, Nigeria, and Rwanda made their first appearances in the tournament.

== Billie Jean King Cup finals ==
Date: 1–6 November 2021
Venue: O2 Arena, Prague, Czech Republic
Surface: Hard (i)

12 nations took part in the Finals, formerly known as World Group. The qualification was as follows:

- 2 finalists of the previous edition
- 1 host nation
- 1 wild card
- 8 winners of a qualifier round, in February 2020

Participating teams
| Australia | Belarus | Belgium | Czech Republic (H) | France (TH) | Germany |
| Canada (WC) | RTF | Slovakia | Spain | Switzerland | United States |

1. In accordance with the ban by the World Anti-Doping Agency (WADA) and a December 2020 decision by the Court of Arbitration for Sport (CAS), the team from RTF was not permitted to use the Russian name, flag, or anthem; it participated in the 2021 Billie Jean King Cup Finals as the team of the RTF (RTF), and used the flag of the RTF.

=== Qualifying round ===
Date: 7–8 February 2020

Sixteen teams played for eight spots in the Finals, in series decided on a home and away basis.

These sixteen teams were:

- 2 losing semifinalists of the previous edition,
- 7 winners & losers of World Group play-offs of previous edition, and
- 4 winners of World Group II play-offs of previous edition, and
- 3 losers of World Group II play-offs of previous edition, based on rankings

The 8 losing teams from the qualifying round played the new play-offs, which ranked the 8 nations that were promoted from the Regional Group I from Americas, Europe/Africa and Asia/Oceania, to see who had to play the 2022 Qualifiers and who stayed in the Regional Group I in 2022.

#: Nations Ranking as of 29 June 2019.

1. United States (2019 Quarterfinalist, #2)
2. Belarus (2019 Semifinalist, #5)
3. Romania (2019 Semifinalist, #6)
4. Germany (2019 Quarterfinalist, #7)
5. Spain (2019 WG play-off winner, #8)
6. Switzerland (2019 WG play-off loser, #9)
7. Belgium (2019 Quarterfinalist, #10)
8. Great Britain (2019 WG II play-off winner, #11)
9. Latvia (2019 WG play-off loser, #12)
10. Canada (2019 WG play-off loser, #13)
11. Japan (2019 WG II play-off winner, #14)
12. Slovakia (2019 WG II play-off winner, #15)
13. RTF(2019 WG II play-off winner, #16)
14. Kazakhstan (best ranked WG II play-off loser, #17)
15. Brazil (2nd best ranked WG II play-off loser, #18)
16. Netherlands (3rd best ranked WG II play-off loser, #19)

| Home team | Score | Away team | Location | Venue | Surface | Ref. |
|---|---|---|---|---|---|---|
| United States [1] | 3–2 | Latvia | Everett | Angel of the Winds Arena | Hard (i) | |
| Netherlands | 2–3 | Belarus [2] | The Hague | Sportcampus Zuiderpark | Clay (i) | |
| Romania [3] | 2–3 | RTF | Cluj-Napoca | BT Arena | Hard (i) | |
| Brazil | 0–4 | Germany [4] | Florianópolis | Costão do Santinho Resort | Clay | |
| Spain [5] | 3–1 | Japan | Cartagena | Centro de Tenis La Manga Club | Clay | |
| Switzerland [6] | 3–1 | Canada | Biel/Bienne | Swiss Tennis Arena | Hard (i) | |
| Belgium [7] | 3–1 | Kazakhstan | Kortrijk | SC Lange Munte | Hard (i) | |
| Slovakia | 3–1 | Great Britain [8] | Bratislava | AXA Aréna NTC | Clay (i) | |

=== Group stage ===
| Qualified for the Knockout stage |

T = Ties, M = Matches, S = Sets

| Group | Winners | | | | Runners-up | | | | Third | | | |
| Group | Nation | T | M | S | Nation | T | M | S | Nation | T | M | S |
|---|---|---|---|---|---|---|---|---|---|---|---|---|
| A | RTF | 2–0 | 5–1 | 11–4 | Canada | 1–1 | 2–4 | 5–9 | France | 0–2 | 2–4 | 6–9 |
| B | Australia | 2–0 | 4–2 | 8–7 | Belgium | 1–1 | 3–3 | 8–7 | Belarus | 0–2 | 2–4 | 6–8 |
| C | United States | 1–1 | 3–3 | 7–6 | Slovakia | 1–1 | 3–3 | 8–8 | Spain | 1–1 | 3–3 | 7–8 |
| D | Switzerland | 2–0 | 5–1 | 10–3 | Czech Republic | 1–1 | 3–3 | 7–7 | Germany | 0–2 | 1–5 | 4–11 |

=== Knockout stage ===
Semifinals
RTF | 2
United States | 1
Australia | 0
Switzerland | 2

Finals
RTF | 2
Switzerland | 0

== Play-offs ==
Date: 16–17 April 2021

Sixteen teams played for eight spots in the 2022 qualifying round, in series decided on a home and away basis.

These Sixteen teams were:

- 8 losing teams from Qualifying round.
- 8 winning teams from their Group I zone.

Eight winners advanced to the 2022 qualifying round and eight losers contest regional Group I event in 2022.

Seeded teams

- Brazil
- Canada
- Great Britain
- Japan
- Kazakhstan
- Latvia
- Netherlands
- Romania

Unseeded teams

- Argentina
- China
- India
- Italy
- Mexico
- Poland
- Serbia
- Ukraine

| Home team | Score | Away team | Location | Venue | Surface | Ref. |
|---|---|---|---|---|---|---|
| Poland | 3–2 | Brazil | Bytom | Hala na Skarpie | Hard (i) | |
| Great Britain | 3–1 | Mexico | London | National Tennis Centre | Hard | |
| Serbia | 0–4 | Canada | Kraljevo | Kraljevo Sports Hall | Hard (i) | |
| Latvia | 3–1 | India | Jūrmala | National Tennis Centre Lielupe | Hard (i) | |
| Ukraine | 4–0 | Japan | Chornomorsk | Elite Tennis Club | Clay | |
| Romania | 1–3 | Italy | Cluj-Napoca | BTarena | Hard (i) | |
| Argentina | 2–3 | Kazakhstan | Córdoba | Córdoba Lawn Tennis Club | Clay | |
| Netherlands | 3–2 | China | 's-Hertogenbosch | Maaspoort | Clay (i) | |

- Brazil,Japan and Romania were relegated to Zonal Group I in 2022.
- Poland,Ukraine and Italy were promoted to Final qualifying round in 2022.

== Americas Zone ==
=== Group I ===
Venue: Club Palestino, Santiago, Chile (clay)

Dates: 5–8 February 2020

Participating teams

Pool A

- Paraguay
- Colombia
- Venezuela

Pool B

- Argentina
- Chile
- Mexico
- Peru

==== Play-offs ====
- Mexico and Argentina were promoted to the 2020 Billie Jean King Cup Play-offs.
- Venezuela and Peru were relegated to Americas Zone Group II in 2022.

=== Group II ===
Venue 1: Centro de Alto Rendimiento Fred Maduro, Panama City, Panama (clay)
Venue 2: Club de Tenis La Paz, La Paz, Bolivia (clay)

Dates: 23–26 June 2021 (Panama City) and 27–30 October 2021 (La Paz)

Participating teams

Pool A (Panama City)

- Bahamas
- Costa Rica
- Uruguay

Pool B (Panama City)

- Cuba
- Ecuador
- El Salvador
- Panama

Pool A (La Paz)

- Dominican Republic
- Guatemala
- Jamaica

Pool B (La Paz)

- Barbados
- Bolivia
- Honduras
- Puerto Rico

Withdrawn

- Trinidad and Tobago

Inactive teams

- Antigua and Barbuda
- Bermuda
- Eastern Caribbean
- Haiti

==== Play-offs ====
- Ecuador and Guatemala were promoted to Americas Zone Group I in 2022.

== Asia/Oceania Zone ==
=== Group I ===
Venue: Aviation Club Tennis Centre, Dubai, United Arab Emirates (hard)

Dates: 3–7 March 2020

Participating teams
Pool A

- China
- Chinese Taipei
- India
- Indonesia
- South Korea
- Uzbekistan

Promotions

- China and India were promoted to the 2020 Billie Jean King Cup Play-offs.
- Uzbekistan and Chinese Taipei were relegated to Asia/Oceania Zone Group II in 2022.

=== Group II ===
Venue 1: Renouf Tennis Centre, Wellington, New Zealand (hard)
Venue 2: ~~Sri Lanka Tennis Association Complex, Colombo, Sri Lanka (clay)~~

Dates: 4–8 February 2020 (Wellington)

Due to COVID-19 restrictions, the event in Sri Lanka could not be held. The Billie Jean King Cup committee decided that in light of the challenges of identifying and appointing a new host nation during the remainder of the 2021 tennis season, the event would take place in 2021. The seven competing nations, Hong Kong China, Iran, Malaysia, Oman, Sri Lanka, Tajikistan and Vietnam, remained in Asia/Oceania Group II, and they competed in the 2022 competition.

Participating teams

Pool A (Wellington)

- Mongolia
- New Zealand
- Pakistan
- Singapore

Pool B (Wellington)

- Guam
- Philippines
- Thailand
- Turkmenistan

Remaining nations

- Hong Kong
- Iran
- Malaysia
- Oman

Remaining nations

- Sri Lanka
- Tajikistan
- Vietnam

Withdrawn

- Bangladesh
- Pacific Oceania

Inactive teams

- Bahrain
- Brunei
- Iraq
- Jordan
- Kyrgyzstan
- Lebanon
- Syria

==== Play-offs ====
- New Zealand was promoted to Asia/Oceania Zone Group I in 2022.

== Europe/Africa Zone ==
=== Group I ===
Venue 1: Tallinn Tennis Center, Tallinn, Estonia (indoor hard)
Venue 2: Centre National de Tennis, Esch-sur-Alzette, Luxembourg (indoor hard)

Dates: 5–8 February 2020

Participating teams

Pool A (Tallinn)

- Bulgaria
- Croatia
- Ukraine

Pool B (Tallinn)

- Austria
- Estonia
- Greece
- Italy

Pool A (Esch-sur-Alzette)

- Luxembourg
- Serbia
- Sweden

Pool B (Esch-sur-Alzette)

- Poland
- Slovenia
- Turkey

==== Play-offs ====
- Ukraine, Italy, Serbia, and Poland were promoted to the 2020 Billie Jean King Cup Play-offs.
- Greece and Luxembourg were relegated to Europe/Africa Zone Group II in 2022.

=== Group II ===
Venue: Tali Tennis Center, Helsinki, Finland (indoor hard)

Dates: 4–7 February 2020

Participating teams

Pool A

- Georgia
- Israel
- Moldova
- Tunisia

Pool B

- Denmark
- Egypt
- Finland
- Portugal

==== Play-offs ====
- Georgia and Denmark were promoted to Europe/Africa Zone Group I in 2022.
- Moldova and Portugal were relegated to Europe/Africa Zone Group III in 2022.

=== Group III ===
Venue: SEB Arena, Vilnius, Lithuania (indoor hard)

Dates: 15–19 June 2021

Participating teams

Pool A

- Albania
- North Macedonia
- Norway

Pool B

- Bosnia and Herzegovina
- Cyprus
- Rwanda

Pool C

- Kosovo
- Lithuania
- Nigeria

Pool D

- Armenia
- Ghana
- Iceland
- Ireland

Pool E

- Algeria
- Kenya
- Malta
- Zimbabwe

Pool F

- Azerbaijan
- Montenegro
- Namibia
- South Africa

Withdrawn

- Congo
- Morocco

Inactive teams

- Botswana
- Cameroon
- Ethiopia
- Lesotho
- Liechtenstein
- Madagascar
- Mauritius
- Mozambique
- San Marino
- Senegal
- Uganda

==== Play-offs ====
- Lithuania and Norway were promoted to Europe/Africa Zone Group II in 2022.
