= SEB Arena =

Sports venue in Vilnius, Lithuania

Coordinates: 54°42′26″N 25°14′2″E

- Vitas Gerulaitis Memorial Tennis Centre

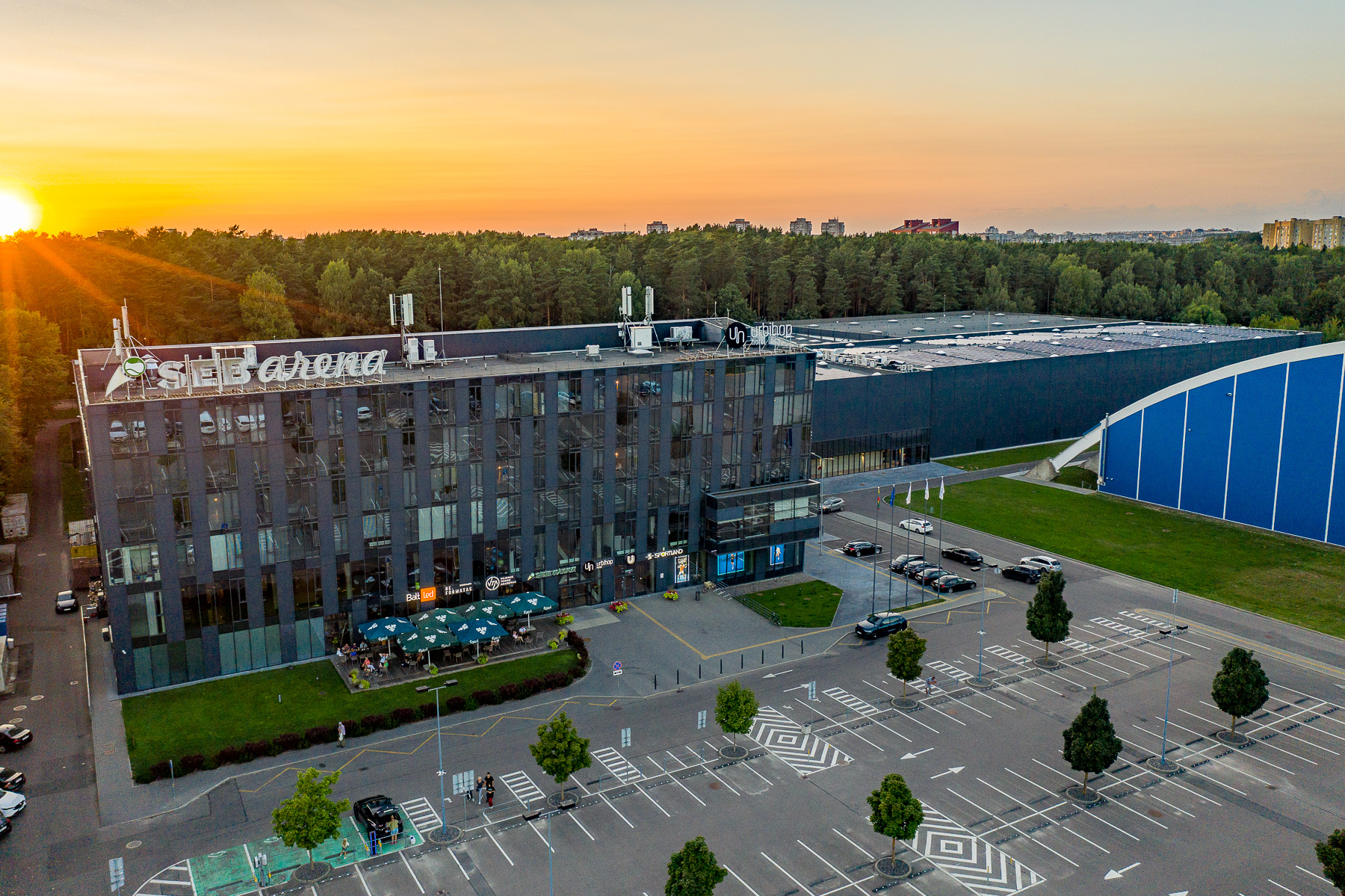
- SEB Arena complex on Ažuolyno str., Vilnius
- Interactive map of SEB Arena
- Location: Vilnius, Lithuania
- Owner: Darnu Group
- Capacity: Central court: 1,278 (tennis, wrestling, judo, karate); 1,934 (concerts); 2,206 (boxing)
- Surface: GreenSet hardcourt

Construction
- Opened: 2008

SEB Arena is tennis, squash, badminton, and mini-tennis arena in Vilnius. It is recognized as an ITF Silver Level certified National Training Centre.

The Arena was completed in 2008. After the 2022 expansion it holds 28 tennis, 2 squash, 4 badminton, and 10 mini-tennis courts, making it the largest tennis complex in central Europe and home of the Lithuanian tennis and squash teams.

It hosts Davis Cup and Billie Jean King Cup matches. It's also the venue for the Vilnius Open and Vitas Gerulaitis Cup tennis tournaments, part of the ATP Challenger Tour.
