= 2001 Fed Cup Europe/Africa Zone =

Subsection of tennis competition

The Europe/Africa Zone was one of three zones of regional competition in the 2001 Fed Cup.

== Group I ==
- Venue: Murcia, Spain (outdoor clay)
- Date: 24–28 April

The seventeen teams were divided into four pools, three of which had four and one of which had five teams. The top team of each pool played off in a randomly drawn tie to determine which two nations progress to the World Group play-offs. The four nations coming last in the pools were relegated to Group II for 2001.

=== Pools ===
	Pool A	NED	YUG	POL	MKD
1	Netherlands (3–0)		3–0	3–0	3–0
2	Yugoslavia (2–1)	0–3		3–0	3–0
3	Poland (1–2)	0–3	0–3		3–0
4	Macedonia (0–3)	0–3	0–3	0–3	

	Pool B	SLO	UKR	EST	RSA
1	Slovenia (3–0)		2–1	3–0	2–1
2	Ukraine (2–1)	1–2		2–1	2–1
3	Estonia (1–2)	0–3	1–2		2–1
4	South Africa (0–3)	1–2	1–2	1–2	

	Pool C	SWE	BLR	ROU	GBR
1	Sweden (3–0)		3–0	2–1	3–0
2	Belarus (2–1)	0–3		2–1	2–1
3	Romania (1–2)	1–2	1–2		2–1
4	Great Britain (0–3)	0–3	1–2	1–2	

	Pool D	ISR	GRE	LUX	BUL	DEN
1	Israel (4–0)		2–0	2–1	2–1	3–0
2	Greece (3–1)	0–2		2–1	2–1	3–0
3	Luxembourg (1–3)	1–2	1–2		2–1	1–2
4	Bulgaria (1–3)	1–2	1–2	1–2		2–1
5	Denmark (1–3)	0–3	0–3	2–1	1–2	

=== Play-offs ===
Winning team	Score	Losing team
Sweden	2–0	Netherlands
Israel	2–0	Slovenia

- Sweden and Israel advanced to 2001 World Group play-offs.
- Macedonia, South Africa, Great Britain and Denmark relegated to Group II for 2002.

== Group II ==
- Venue: Belek, Antalya, Turkey (outdoor clay)
- Date: 14–17 May

The eighteen teams were divided into two pools of five and two pools of four. The top teams from each pool advanced to Group I for 2002.

=== Pools ===
	Pool A	GEO	LAT	IRL	MLT
1	Georgia (3–0)		3–0	3–0	3–0
2	Latvia (1–2)	0–3		2–1	1–2
3	Ireland (1–2)	0–3	1–2		2–1
4	Malta (1–2)	0–3	2–1	1–2	

	Pool B	POR	FIN	ALG	MAR
1	Portugal (3–0)		2–1	3–0	2–1
2	Finland (2–1)	1–2		3–0	2–1
3	Algeria (1–2)	0–3	0–3		2–1
4	Morocco (0–3)	1–2	1–2	1–2	

	Pool C	BIH	EGY	ARM	LES	KEN
1	Bosnia and Herzegovina (4–0)		3–0	3–0	3–0	3–0
2	Egypt (3–1)	0–3		2–1	3–0	3–0
3	Armenia (2–2)	0–3	1–2		3–0	3–0
4	Lesotho (1–3)	0–3	0–3	0–3		2–1
5	Kenya (0–4)	0–3	0–3	0–3	1–2	

	Pool D	TUR	LTU	MDA	TUN	BOT
1	Turkey (4–0)		2–1	3–0	3–0	3–0
2	Lithuania (3–1)	1–2		3–0	3–0	3–0
3	Moldova (2–2)	0–3	0–3		3–0	2–1
4	Tunisia (1–3)	0–3	0–3	0–3		2–1
5	Botswana (0–4)	0–3	0–3	1–2	1–2	

- Georgia, Portugal, Bosnia and Herzegovina and Turkey advanced to Group I in 2002.

== See also ==
- Fed Cup structure
