= 2004 Fed Cup Europe/Africa Zone =

Subsection of tennis competition

The Europe/Africa Zone was one of three zones of regional competition in the 2004 Fed Cup.

== Group I ==
- Venue: Athens Lawn Tennis Club, Athens, Greece (outdoor clay)
- Date: 19–24 April

The fourteen teams were divided into two pools of three teams and two pools of four. The top teams of each pool played-off against the second-placed teams to decide which four nations progress to World Group play-offs. The four nations coming last played-off against each other to decide which teams are relegated to Group II for 2005.

=== Pools ===
	Pool A	SCG	SWE	LTU
1	Serbia and Montenegro (2–0)		3–0	3–0
2	Sweden (1–1)	0–3		3–0
3	Lithuania (0–2)	0–3	0–3	

	Pool B	UKR	ISR	NED	RSA
1	Ukraine (3–0)		3–0	2–1	2–1
2	Israel (2–1)	0–3		3–0	2–1
3	Netherlands (1–2)	1–2	0–3		2–1
4	South Africa (0–3)	1–2	1–2	1–2	

	Pool C	BLR	HUN	DEN
1	Belarus (2–0)		3–0	3–0
2	Hungary (1–1)	0–3		3–0
3	Denmark (0–2)	0–3	0–3	

	Pool D	EST	BUL	POL	GRE
1	Estonia (3–0)		2–1	2–1	3–0
2	Bulgaria (2–1)	1–2		2–1	2–1
3	Poland (1–2)	1–2	1–2		2–1
4	Greece (0–3)	0–3	1–2	1–2	

=== Play-offs ===
Winning team	Score	Losing team
Bulgaria	2–1	Serbia and Montenegro
Ukraine	2–0	Hungary
Belarus	2–1	Sweden
Estonia	2–1	Israel

Winning team	Score	Losing team
Greece	2–0	Lithuania
South Africa	2–0	Denmark

- Bulgaria, Ukraine, Belarus and Estonia advanced to 2004 World Group play-offs.
- Lithuania and Denmark were relegated to Group II for 2004.

== Group II ==
- Venue: Marsa, Malta (outdoor hard)
- Date: 26 April – 1 May

The nine teams were divided into a pool of four teams and a pool of five. The top teams of each pool played-off against the second-placed teams to decide which two nations progress to Group I for 2005. The four nations coming last played-off against the second-to-last placed teams to determine which teams would be relegated to Group III for 2005.

=== Pools ===
	Pool A	GBR	ROU	TUR	EGY
1	Great Britain (3–0)		2–1	3–0	3–0
2	Romania (2–1)	1–2		3–0	3–0
3	Turkey (1–2)	0–3	0–3		3–0
4	Egypt (0–3)	0–3	0–3	0–3	

	Pool B	LUX	IRL	LAT	GEO	FIN
1	Luxembourg (4–0)		2–1	2–1	3–0	3–0
2	Ireland (3–1)	1–2		3–0	3–0	3–0
3	Latvia (2–2)	1–2	0–3		2–1	2–1
4	Georgia (1–3)	0–3	0–3	1–2		2–1
5	Finland (0–4)	0–3	0–3	1–2	1–2	

=== Play-offs ===
Placing	A Team	Score	B Team
Promotion	Great Britain	2–0	Ireland
Promotion	Romania	1–2	Luxembourg
5th	N/A		Latvia
Relegation	Turkey	0–3	Finland
Relegation	Egypt	0–3	Georgia

- Great Britain and Luxembourg advanced to Group I for 2005.
- Egypt and Turkey was relegated to Group III for 2005.

== Group III ==
- Venue: Marsa, Malta (outdoor hard)
- Date: 26 April – 1 May

The eight teams were divided into two pools of four teams. The top teams of each pool played-off against the second-placed teams to decide which two nations progress to Group II for 2005. The other teams played against each other to determine overall placings.

=== Pools ===
	Pool A	NOR	ALG	BIH	NAM
1	Norway (3–0)		2–1	2–1	3–0
2	Algeria (2–1)	1–2		2–1	3–0
3	Bosnia and Herzegovina (1–2)	1–2	1–2		2–1
4	Namibia (0–3)	0–3	0–3	1–2	

	Pool B	TUN	MLT	BOT	KEN
1	Tunisia (3–0)		2–1	2–1	3–0
2	Malta (2–1)	1–2		3–0	3–0
3	Botswana (1–2)	1–2	0–3		2–1
4	Kenya (0–3)	0–3	0–3	1–2	

=== Play-offs ===
Placing	A Team	Score	B Team
Promotion	Norway	2–1	Malta
Promotion	Algeria	1–2	Tunisia
5th–7th	Bosnia and Herzegovina	3–0	Kenya
5th–7th	Namibia	1–2	Botswana

- Norway and Tunisia advanced to Group II for 2005.

== See also ==
- Fed Cup structure
