= 2004 Fed Cup Europe/Africa Zone Group III – play-offs =

International tennis competition play-offs

The play-offs of the 2004 Fed Cup Europe/Africa Zone Group III were the final stages of the Group I Zonal Competition involving teams from Europe and Africa. Using the positions determined in their pools, the eight teams faced off to determine their placing in the 2004 Fed Cup Europe/Africa Zone Group III. The top two teams advanced to Group II for next year.

Placing	Pool A	Pool B
1	Norway	Tunisia
2	Algeria	Malta
3	Bosnia and Herzegovina	Botswana
4	Namibia	Kenya

== Promotion play-offs ==
The first and second placed teams of each pool were placed against each other in two head-to-head rounds. The winner of the rounds advanced to Group II.

=== Norway vs. Malta ===
Norway
2
Marsa, Malta
30 April 2004
Hard (outdoors)

Malta
1

			1	2	3
1	(Norway) (Malta)	Karoline Borgersen; Lisa Camenzuli	4; 6	7^{7} 6^{3}	4; 6
2	(Norway) (Malta)	Ina Sartz; Rosanne Dimech	6; 3	4; 6	6; 2
3	(Norway) (Malta)	Karoline Borgersen / Ina Sartz; Lisa Camenzuli / Rosanne Dimech	7; 5	6; 4

=== Algeria vs. Tunisia ===
Algeria
1
Marsa, Malta
30 April 2004
Hard (outdoors)

Tunisia
2

			1	2	3
1	(Algeria) (Tunisia)	Sana Ben Salah; Selima Frioui	6; 0	6; 1
2	(Algeria) (Tunisia)	Samia Medjahdi; Selima Sfar	5; 6	2; 6
3	(Algeria) (Tunisia)	Sana Ben Salah / Assia Halo; Issem Essaies / Selima Sfar	2; 6	2; 6

== Fifth to Seventh play-off ==
The third and fourth placed teams of each pool were placed against each other in two head-to-head rounds. The winner of the rounds were allocated fifth place in the Group, while the losers were allocated seventh.

=== Bosnia and Herzegovina vs. Kenya ===
Bosnia and Herzegovina
3
Marsa, Malta
30 April 2004
Hard (outdoors)

Kenya
0

			1	2	3
1	(Bosnia and Herzegovina) (Kenya)	Selma Babić; Evelyn Otula	6; 4	6; 1
2	(Bosnia and Herzegovina) (Kenya)	Sanja Račić; Caroline Oduor	6; 1	6; 1
3	(Bosnia and Herzegovina) (Kenya)	Selma Babić / Nadina Šećerbegović; Wanjika Ngaruiya / Evelyn Otula	6; 1	6; 2

=== Namibia vs. Botswana ===
Namibia
1
Marsa, Malta
30 April 2004
Hard (outdoors)

Botswana
2

			1	2	3
1	(Namibia) (Botswana)	Elrien De Villiers; Laone Botshoma	6; 1	6; 1
2	(Namibia) (Botswana)	Elna De Villiers; Tapiwa Marobela	5; 7	6^{1} 7^{7}
3	(Namibia) (Botswana)	Alet Boonzaaier / Elna De Villiers; Tapiwa Marobela / Lesedi Ramocha	6; 4	6^{5} 7^{7}	5; 7

== Final Placements ==
Placing	Teams
Promoted	Norway
Promoted	Tunisia
Third	Malta
Third	Algeria
Fifth	Bosnia and Herzegovina
Fifth	Botswana
Seventh	Kenya
Seventh	Namibia

- Norway and Tunisia advanced to Group II, where they both placed seventh and thus were relegated back to Group III for 2006.

== See also ==
- Fed Cup structure
