= 2001 Fed Cup Europe/Africa Zone Group II – Pool C =

International tennis competition

Group C of the 2001 Fed Cup Europe/Africa Zone Group II was one of four pools in the Europe/Africa zone of the 2001 Fed Cup. Five teams competed in a round robin competition, with the top team advancing to Group I for 2002.

| | (Bosnia and Herzegovina) BIH | (Egypt) EGY | (Armenia) ARM | (Lesotho) LES | (Kenya) KEN | Match; W–L | Set; W–L | Game; W–L | Standings |
| Bosnia and Herzegovina | | 3–0 | 3–0 | 3–0 | 3–0 | 4–0 | 24–0 | 145–43 | 1 |
| Egypt | 0–3 | | 2–1 | 3–0 | 3–0 | 3–1 | 16–8 | 118–85 | 2 |
| Armenia | 0–3 | 1–2 | | 3–0 | 3–0 | 2–2 | 14–10 | 113–87 | 3 |
| Lesotho | 0–3 | 0–3 | 0–3 | | 2–1 | 1–3 | 4–20 | 63–133 | 4 |
| Kenya | 0–3 | 0–3 | 0–3 | 1–2 | | 0–4 | 2–22 | 46–137 | 5 |

== Bosnia and Herzegovina vs. Egypt ==
Bosnia and Herzegovina
3
Belek, Antalya, Turkey
14 May 2001
Red clay (outdoors)

Egypt
0

| | | | 1 | 2 | 3 |
|---|---|---|---|---|---|
| 1 | (Bosnia and Herzegovina) (Egypt) | Helena Bešović; Noha Mohsen | 6; 2 | 6; 4 |
| 2 | (Bosnia and Herzegovina) (Egypt) | Mervana Jugić-Salkić; Yomna Farid | 6; 3 | 6; 2 |
| 3 | (Bosnia and Herzegovina) (Egypt) | Helena Bešović / Mervana Jugić-Salkić; Nermien Abaza / Rawya Seif | 6; 3 | 6; 0 |

== Armenia vs. Kenya ==
Armenia
3
Belek, Antalya, Turkey
14 May 2001
Red clay (outdoors)

Kenya
0

| | | | 1 | 2 | 3 |
|---|---|---|---|---|---|
| 1 | (Armenia) (Kenya) | Ana Gasparyan; Caroline Oduor | 6; 1 | 6; 0 |
| 2 | (Armenia) (Kenya) | Liudmila Nikoyan; Evelyn Otula | 6; 1 | 6; 3 |
| 3 | (Armenia) (Kenya) | Tatevik Babayan / Liudmila Nikoyan; Esther Mbugua / Florence Mbugua | 6; 0 | 6; 2 |

== Bosnia and Herzegovina vs. Lesotho ==
Bosnia and Herzegovina
3
Belek, Antalya, Turkey
15 May 2001
Red clay (outdoors)

Lesotho
0

| | | | 1 | 2 | 3 |
|---|---|---|---|---|---|
| 1 | (Bosnia and Herzegovina) (Lesotho) | Helena Bešović; Liako Selokoma | 6; 0 | 6; 0 |
| 2 | (Bosnia and Herzegovina) (Lesotho) | Mervana Jugić-Salkić; Mamotebang Molise | 6; 1 | 6; 2 |
| 3 | (Bosnia and Herzegovina) (Lesotho) | Maja Mešanović / Lejla Husić; Mamotebang Molise / Liako Selokoma | 6; 0 | 6; 2 |

== Egypt vs. Armenia ==
Egypt
2
Belek, Antalya, Turkey
15 May 2001
Red clay (outdoors)

Armenia
1

| | | | 1 | 2 | 3 |
|---|---|---|---|---|---|
| 1 | (Egypt) (Armenia) | Noha Mohsen; Ana Gasparyan | 6; 3 | 6; 1 |
| 2 | (Egypt) (Armenia) | Yomna Farid; Liudmila Nikoyan | 6; 2 | 6; 3 |
| 3 | (Egypt) (Armenia) | Yomna Farid / Noha Mohsen; Tatevik Babayan / Liudmila Nikoyan | 4; 6 | 2; 6 |

== Bosnia and Herzegovina vs. Kenya ==
Bosnia and Herzegovina
3
Belek, Antalya, Turkey
16 May 2001
Red clay (outdoors)

Kenya
0

| | | | 1 | 2 | 3 |
|---|---|---|---|---|---|
| 1 | (Bosnia and Herzegovina) (Kenya) | Maja Mešanović; Caroline Oduor | 6; 0 | 6; 1 |
| 2 | (Bosnia and Herzegovina) (Kenya) | Mervana Jugić-Salkić; Evelyn Otula | 6; 2 | 6; 1 |
| 3 | (Bosnia and Herzegovina) (Kenya) | Helena Bešović / Lejla Husić; Esther Mbugua / Florence Mbugua | 6; 0 | 6; 2 |

== Egypt vs. Lesotho ==
Egypt
3
Belek, Antalya, Turkey
16 May 2001
Red clay (outdoors)

Lesotho
0

| | | | 1 | 2 | 3 |
|---|---|---|---|---|---|
| 1 | (Egypt) (Lesotho) | Nermien Abaza; Mamotebang Molise | 6; 3 | 6; 2 |
| 2 | (Egypt) (Lesotho) | Yomna Farid; Tankiso Letseka | 6; 0 | 6; 0 |
| 3 | (Egypt) (Lesotho) | Nermien Abaza / Rawya Seif; Tankiso Letseka / Mamotebang Molise | 7; 5 | 7^{7} 6^{3} |

== Bosnia and Herzegovina vs. Armenia ==
Bosnia and Herzegovina
3
Belek, Antalya, Turkey
17 May 2001
Red clay (outdoors)

Armenia
0

| | | | 1 | 2 | 3 |
|---|---|---|---|---|---|
| 1 | (Bosnia and Herzegovina) (Armenia) | Helena Bešović; Tatevik Babayan | 6; 3 | 6; 2 |
| 2 | (Bosnia and Herzegovina) (Armenia) | Mervana Jugić-Salkić; Liudmila Nikoyan | 6; 0 | 6; 3 |
| 3 | (Bosnia and Herzegovina) (Armenia) | Mervana Jugić-Salkić / Maja Mešanović; Ana Gasparyan / Liudmila Nikoyan | 6; 4 | 7^{7} 6^{3} |

== Lesotho vs. Kenya ==
Lesotho
2
Belek, Antalya, Turkey
17 May 2001
Red clay (outdoors)

Kenya
1

| | | | 1 | 2 | 3 |
|---|---|---|---|---|---|
| 1 | (Lesotho) (Kenya) | Mamotebang Molise; Esther Mbugua | 6; 3 | 6; 4 |
| 2 | (Lesotho) (Kenya) | Tankiso Letseka; Evelyn Otula | 6; 1 | 6; 0 |
| 3 | (Lesotho) (Kenya) | Mamotebang Molise / Liako Selokoma; Florence Mbugua / Evelyn Otula | 5; 7 | 0; 6 |

== Egypt vs. Kenya ==
Egypt
3
Belek, Antalya, Turkey
18 May 2001
Red clay (outdoors)

Kenya
0

| | | | 1 | 2 | 3 |
|---|---|---|---|---|---|
| 1 | (Egypt) (Kenya) | Nermien Abaza; Esther Mbugua | 6; 2 | 6; 3 |
| 2 | (Egypt) (Kenya) | Noha Mohsen; Evelyn Otula | 6; 2 | 6; 1 |
| 3 | (Egypt) (Kenya) | Yomna Farid / Rawya Seif; Florence Mbugua / Evelyn Otula | 6; 2 | 6; 2 |

== Armenia vs. Lesotho ==
Armenia
3
Belek, Antalya, Turkey
18 May 2001
Red clay (outdoors)

Lesotho
0

| | | | 1 | 2 | 3 |
|---|---|---|---|---|---|
| 1 | (Armenia) (Lesotho) | Ana Gasparyan; Mamotebang Molise | 6; 1 | 6; 0 |
| 2 | (Armenia) (Lesotho) | Liudmila Nikoyan; Tankiso Letseka | 6; 3 | 6; 3 |
| 3 | (Armenia) (Lesotho) | Tatevik Babayan / Liudmila Nikoyan; Tankiso Letseka / Mamotebang Molise | 7; 5 | 6; 1 |

- Bosnia and Herzegovina placed first in this group and thus advanced to Group I for 2002, where they placed last in their pool of four, and was thus relegated back to Group II for 2003.

== See also ==
- Fed Cup structure
