= 2004 Fed Cup Europe/Africa Zone Group I – play-offs =

The play-offs of the 2004 Fed Cup Europe/Africa Zone Group I were the final stages of the Group I Zonal Competition involving teams from Europe and Africa. Those that qualified for this stage placed first and second in their respective pools, and also last in their pools.

Placing	Pool A	Pool B	Pool C	Pool D
1	Serbia and Montenegro	Ukraine	Belarus	Estonia
2	Sweden	Israel	Hungary	Bulgaria
3	Lithuania	Netherlands	Denmark	Poland
4		South Africa		Greece

The eight top teams were then randomly paired up the team from a different placing of another group for a play-off tie, with the winners being promoted to the World Group play-offs. The four bottom teams were also randomly paired up in play-off ties with the losers being relegated down to Group II for 2005.

== Promotion play-offs ==
=== Serbia and Montenegro vs. Bulgaria ===
Serbia and Montenegro
1
Athens Lawn Tennis Club, Athens, Greece
24 April 2004
Red clay (outdoors)

Bulgaria
2

			1	2	3
1	(Serbia and Montenegro) (Bulgaria)	Jelena Janković; Tsvetana Pironkova	6; 4	6; 1
2	(Serbia and Montenegro) (Bulgaria)	Jelena Dokić; Sesil Karatantcheva				w/o
3	(Serbia and Montenegro) (Bulgaria)	Ana Timotić / Dragana Zarić; Sesil Karatantcheva / Maria Penkova	4; 6	6; 2	3; 6

- Bulgaria advanced to the World Group play-offs, where they were drawn against Japan. They lost 2–3, and thus were relegated back to Group I for next year.

=== Ukraine vs. Hungary ===
Ukraine
2
Athens Lawn Tennis Club, Athens, Greece
24 April 2004
Red clay (outdoors)

Hungary
0

			1	2	3
1	(Ukraine) (Hungary)	Elena Tatarkova; Kira Nagy	7; 5	6; 2
2	(Ukraine) (Hungary)	Yuliya Beygelzimer; Melinda Czink	3; 6	6; 3	6; 2
3	(Ukraine) (Hungary)	Mariya Koryttseva / Olga Savchuk; Katalin Marosi / Kira Nagy				not played

- Ukraine advanced to the World Group play-offs, where they were drawn against Germany. They lost 2–3, and thus were relegated back to Group I for next year.

=== Belarus vs. Sweden ===
Belarus
2
Athens Lawn Tennis Club, Athens, Greece
24 April 2004
Red clay (outdoors)

Sweden
1

			1	2	3
1	(Belarus) (Sweden)	Tatsiana Uvarova; Hanna Nooni	7; 5	6; 4
2	(Belarus) (Sweden)	Anastasiya Yakimova; Sofia Arvidsson	6^{5} 7^{7}	3; 6
3	(Belarus) (Sweden)	Darya Kustova / Tatiana Poutchek; Sofia Arvidsson / Hanna Nooni	6; 2	6; 2

- Belarus advanced to the World Group play-offs, where they were drawn against Slovakia. They lost 0–4, and thus were relegated back to Group I for next year.

=== Estonia vs. Israel ===
Estonia
2
Athens Lawn Tennis Club, Athens, Greece
24 April 2004
Red clay (outdoors)

Israel
1

			1	2	3
1	(Estonia) (Israel)	Maret Ani; Tzipora Obziler	5; 7	6; 2	6; 4
2	(Estonia) (Israel)	Kaia Kanepi; Anna Smashnova	0; 6	0; 6
3	(Estonia) (Israel)	Maret Ani / Kaia Kanepi; Tzipora Obziler / Anna Smashnova	7; 5	6; 1

- Estonia advanced to the World Group play-offs, where they were drawn against Czech Republic. They lost 2–3, and thus were relegated back to Group I for next year.

== Relegation play-offs ==
=== Lithuania vs. Greece ===
Lithuania
0
Athens Lawn Tennis Club, Athens, Greece
24 April 2004
Red clay (outdoors)

Greece
2

			1	2	3
1	(Lithuania) (Greece)	Edita Liachovičiūtė; Christina Zachariadou	6; 3	0; 6	3; 6
2	(Lithuania) (Greece)	Lina Stančiūtė; Eleni Daniilidou	2; 6	2; 6
3	(Lithuania) (Greece)	Edita Liachovičiūtė / Lina Stančiūtė; Eleni Daniilidou / Asimina Kaplani				not played

- Lithuania was relegated down to Group II for next year, where they placed fifth overall.

=== Denmark vs. South Africa ===
Denmark
0
Athens Lawn Tennis Club, Athens, Greece
24 April 2004
Red clay (outdoors)

South Africa
2

			1	2	3
1	(Denmark) (South Africa)	Maria Rasmussen; Nicole Rencken	4; 6	0; 6
2	(Denmark) (South Africa)	Karina-Ildor Jacobsgaard; Natalie Grandin	4; 6	2; 6
3	(Denmark) (South Africa)	Mette Iversen / Karina-Ildor Jacobsgaard; Natalie Grandin / Nicole Rencken				not played

- Denmark was relegated down to Group II for next year.

== See also ==
- Fed Cup structure
