= 2004 Fed Cup Europe/Africa Zone Group III – Pool A =

International tennis competition

Group A of the 2004 Fed Cup Europe/Africa Zone Group III was one of two pools in the Europe/Africa Zone Group III of the 2004 Fed Cup. Four teams competed in a round robin competition, with the top two teams and the bottom two teams proceeding to their respective sections of the play-offs: the top teams play for advancement to the Group II.

		(Bosnia and Herzegovina) BIH	(Algeria) ALG	(Norway) NOR	(Namibia) NAM	RR; W–L	Set; W–L	Game; W–L	Standings
72	Bosnia and Herzegovina		1–2	1–2	2–1	1–2	9–12	90–101	3
78	Algeria	2–1		1–2	3–0	2–1	14–6	105–77	2
79	Norway	2–1	2–1		3–0	3–0	15–6	108–81	1
	Namibia	1–2	0–3	0–3		0–3	3–17	76–120	4

== Bosnia and Herzegovina vs. Algeria ==
Bosnia and Herzegovina
1
Marsa, Malta
27 April 2004
Hard (outdoors)

Algeria
2

			1	2	3
1	(Bosnia and Herzegovina) (Algeria)	Selma Babić; Sana Ben Salah	0; 6	5; 7
2	(Bosnia and Herzegovina) (Algeria)	Sanja Račić; Samia Medjahdi	3; 6	0; 6
3	(Bosnia and Herzegovina) (Algeria)	Selma Babić / Nadina Šećerbegović; Assia Halo / Sara Meghoufel	6; 2	6; 1

== Norway vs. Namibia ==
Norway
3
Marsa, Malta
27 April 2004
Hard (outdoors)

Namibia
0

			1	2	3
1	(Norway) (Namibia)	Karoline Borgersen; Elna De Villiers	6; 3	6; 3
2	(Norway) (Namibia)	Ina Sartz; Alet Boonzaaier	6; 4	7^{7} 6^{4}
3	(Norway) (Namibia)	Karoline Borgersen / Ina Sartz; Alet Boonzaaier / Elrien De Villiers	6; 1	6; 0

== Bosnia and Herzegovina vs. Norway ==
Bosnia and Herzegovina
1
Marsa, Malta
28 April 2004
Hard (outdoors)

Norway
2

			1	2	3
1	(Bosnia and Herzegovina) (Norway)	Selma Babić; Karoline Borgersen	2; 6	3; 6
2	(Bosnia and Herzegovina) (Norway)	Sanja Račić; Ina Sartz	4; 6	5; 7
3	(Bosnia and Herzegovina) (Norway)	Selma Babić / Nadina Šećerbegović; Annette Aksdal / Idunn Hertzberg	6; 1	2; 6	6; 3

== Algeria vs. Namibia ==
Algeria
3
Marsa, Malta
28 April 2004
Hard (outdoors)

Namibia
0

			1	2	3
1	(Algeria) (Namibia)	Sana Ben Salah; Elna De Villiers	6; 3	6; 0
2	(Algeria) (Namibia)	Samia Medjahdi; Alet Boonzaaier	6; 2	7^{8} 6^{6}
3	(Algeria) (Namibia)	Assia Halo / Sara Meghoufel; Alet Boonzaaier / Elna De Villiers	4; 6	6; 2	6; 2

== Bosnia and Herzegovina vs. Namibia ==
Bosnia and Herzegovina
2
Marsa, Malta
29 April 2004
Hard (outdoors)

Namibia
1

			1	2	3
1	(Bosnia and Herzegovina) (Namibia)	Selma Babić; Elrien De Villiers	6; 1	6; 2
2	(Bosnia and Herzegovina) (Namibia)	Sanja Račić; Alet Boonzaaier	5; 7	7^{7} 6^{3}	3; 6
3	(Bosnia and Herzegovina) (Namibia)	Selma Babić / Nadina Šećerbegović; Alet Boonzaaier / Elna De Villiers	7^{7} 6^{5}	2; 6	6; 4

== Algeria vs. Norway ==
Algeria
1
Marsa, Malta
29 April 2004
Hard (outdoors)

Norway
2

			1	2	3
1	(Algeria) (Norway)	Sana Ben Salah; Karoline Borgersen	6; 2	6^{5} 7^{7}	0; 6
2	(Algeria) (Norway)	Samia Medjahdi; Ina Sartz	6; 0	7; 5
3	(Algeria) (Norway)	Sana Ben Salah / Samia Medjahdi; Karoline Borgersen / Ina Sartz	6; 4	4; 6	1; 6

== See also ==
- Fed Cup structure
