= Samia Medjahdi =

Algerian tennis player

Samia Medjahdi سامية مجاهدي
- Country (sports): Algeria
- Born: 6 January 1985 (age 40); Algeria
- Retired: 2012
- Plays: Right-handed (two-handed backhand)
- Prize money: $32,339

Singles
- Career record: 100 - 105
- Career titles: 0
- Highest ranking: 370 (7 August 2006)

Doubles
- Career record: 28 - 36
- Career titles: 1 ITF
- Highest ranking: 505 (29 August 2005)

Team competitions
- Fed Cup: 8–7
Medal record
Representing Algeria
Women's tennis
All-Africa Games
Gold medal – first place	2007 Algiers	Singles
Gold medal – first place	2007 Algiers	Doubles
Gold medal – first place	2007 Algiers	Team
Bronze medal – third place	2011 Maputo	Doubles

Samia Medjahdi (Arabic: سامية مجاهدي; born 6 January 1985) is a retired Algerian tennis player.

Medjahdi has a WTA singles career high ranking of 370 achieved on 7 August 2006. She also has a WTA doubles career high ranking of 505 achieved on 29 August 2005. Medjahdi has won one ITF doubles title.

Playing for Algeria in Fed Cup, Medjahdi has a W/L record of 8–7.

== ITF finals (1–4) ==
=== Singles (0–1) ===
Legend $100,000 tournaments $75,000 tournaments $50,000 tournaments $25,000 tournaments $10,000 tournaments	Finals by surface Hard (0–0) Clay (0–1) Grass (0–0) Carpet (0–0)

Result	Date	Tournament	Surface	Opponent	Score
Loss	7 May 2006	Rabat, Morocco	Clay	(Romania) Raluca Olaru	2–6, 6–2, 5–7

=== Doubles (1–3) ===
Result	Date	Tournament	Surface	Partner	Opponents	Score
Loss	15 August 2005	Koksijde, Belgium	Clay	(Belgium) Jessie de Vries	(Czech Republic) Iveta Gerlová (Germany) Carmen Klaschka	1–6, 0–6
Loss	8 January 2007	Algiers, Algeria	Clay	(Algeria) Assia Halo	(Netherlands) Talitha De Groot (Netherlands) Michelle Gerards	6–1, 3–6, 2–6
Loss	7 May 2007	Rabat, Morocco	Clay	(Italy) Silvia Disderi	(Romania) Mihaela Buzărnescu (Austria) Melanie Klaffner	1–6, 4–6
Win	16 June 2007	Annaba, Algeria	Clay	(Algeria) Assia Halo	(Madagascar) Seheno Razafindramaso (Russia) Anna Savitskaya	7–5, 7–5

== ITF Junior finals ==
Grand Slam
Category GA
Category G1
Category G2
Category G3
Category G4
Category G5

=== Singles (1–0) ===
Result	No.	Date	Tournament	Surface	Opponent	Score
Win	1.	14 March 2003	Oran, Algeria	Clay	(France) Claire de Gubernatis	6–4, 7–6^{(5)}

== National representation ==
=== Fed Cup ===
Medjahdi made her Fed Cup debut for Algeria in 2003, while the team was competing in the Europe/Africa Zone Group II, when she was 18 years and 114 days old.

==== Fed Cup (8–7) ====
Group membership World Group (0–0) World Group Play-off (0–0) World Group II (0–0) World Group II Play-off (0–0) Europe/Africa Group (8–7)	Matches by surface Hard (3–2) Clay (5–5) Grass (0–0) Carpet (0–0)	Matches by type Singles (7–4) Doubles (1–3)	Matches by setting Indoors (0–0) Outdoors (8–7)

===== Singles (7–4) =====
Edition	Stage	Date	Location	Against	Surface	Opponent	W/L	Score
2003 Fed Cup; Europe/Africa Zone Group II	Pool B	30 April 2003	Estoril, Portugal	Latvia	Clay	Ilona Giberte	W	6–2, 6–1
2003 Fed Cup; Europe/Africa Zone Group II	Pool B	1 May 2003	Estoril, Portugal	Greece	Clay	Nikoleta Kipritidou	L	5–7, 3–6
2004 Fed Cup; Europe/Africa Zone Group III	Pool A	27 April 2004	Marsa, Malta	Bosnia and Herzegovina	Hard	Sanja Račić	W	6–3, 6–0
2004 Fed Cup; Europe/Africa Zone Group III	Pool A	28 April 2004	Marsa, Malta	Namibia	Hard	Alet Boonzaaier	W	6–2, 7–6^{(8–6)}
2004 Fed Cup; Europe/Africa Zone Group III	Pool A	29 April 2004	Marsa, Malta	Norway	Hard	Ina Sartz	W	6–0, 7–5
2004 Fed Cup; Europe/Africa Zone Group III	Promotional Play-off	30 April 2004	Marsa, Malta	Tunisia	Hard	Selima Sfar	L	5–7, 2–6
2005 Fed Cup; Europe/Africa Zone Group III	Pool B	28 April 2005	Manavgat, Turkey	Botswana	Clay	Laone Botshoma	W	6–1, 6–3
2005 Fed Cup; Europe/Africa Zone Group III	Pool B	29 April 2005	Manavgat, Turkey	Iceland	Clay	Sigurlaug Sigurðardóttir	W	6–2, 6–1
2005 Fed Cup; Europe/Africa Zone Group III	Promotional Play-off	30 April 2005	Manavgat, Turkey	Turkey	Clay	İpek Şenoğlu	W	5–7, 6–2, 6–1
2011 Fed Cup; Europe/Africa Zone Group III	Pool A	4 May 2011	Cairo, Egypt	South Africa	Clay	Natalie Grandin	L	1–6, 2–6
2011 Fed Cup; Europe/Africa Zone Group III	Pool A	6 May 2011	Cairo, Egypt	Lithuania	Clay	Joana Eidukonytė	L	1–6, 3–6

===== Doubles (1–3) =====
Edition	Stage	Date	Location	Against	Surface	Partner	Opponents	W/L	Score
2003 Fed Cup; Europe/Africa Zone Group II	Pool B	30 April 2003	Estoril, Portugal	Latvia	Clay	Assia Halo	Irina Kuzmina; Larisa Neiland	L	6–7^{(4–7)}, 3–6
2004 Fed Cup; Europe/Africa Zone Group III	Pool A	29 April 2004	Marsa, Malta	Norway	Hard	Sana Ben Salah	Karoline Borgersen; Ina Sartz	L	6–4, 4–6, 1–6
2005 Fed Cup; Europe/Africa Zone Group III	Promotional Play-off	30 April 2005	Manavgat, Turkey	Turkey	Clay	Assia Halo	Pemra Özgen; İpek Şenoğlu	W	6–7^{(7–9)}, 7–5, 9–7
2011 Fed Cup; Europe/Africa Zone Group III	Pool A	5 May 2011	Cairo, Egypt	Montenegro	Clay	Assia Halo	Danka Kovinić; Danica Krstajić	L	1–6, 2–6
