= 2005 Fed Cup Europe/Africa Zone Group III – play-offs =

International tennis competition play-offs

The play-offs of the 2005 Fed Cup Europe/Africa Zone Group II were the final stages of the Group I Zonal Competition involving teams from Europe and Africa. Using the positions determined in their pools, the sixteen teams faced off to determine their placing in the 2005 Fed Cup Europe/Africa Zone Group III. The top two teams advanced to 2006 Fed Cup Europe/Africa Zone Group II.

Placing	Pool A	Pool B	Pool C	Pool D
1	Turkey	Algeria	Bosnia and Herzegovina	Portugal
2	Egypt	Botswana	Namibia	Moldova
3	Malta	Iceland	Cyprus	Kenya

== Promotion play-offs ==
The first placed teams of each pool were placed against each other in two head-to-head rounds. The winner of the rounds advanced to Group II for next year.

=== Turkey vs. Algeria ===
Turkey
1
Club Ali Bey, Manavgat, Antalya, Turkey
30 April 2005
Red clay (outdoors)

Algeria
2

			1	2	3
1	(Turkey) (Algeria)	Pemra Özgen; Assia Halo	7^{7} 6^{5}	6; 1
2	(Turkey) (Algeria)	İpek Şenoğlu; Samia Medjahdi	7; 5	2; 6	1; 6
3	(Turkey) (Algeria)	Pemra Özgen / İpek Şenoğlu; Assia Halo / Samia Medjahdi	7^{9} 6^{7}	5; 7	7; 9

=== Bosnia and Herzegovina vs. Portugal ===
Bosnia and Herzegovina
1
Club Ali Bey, Manavgat, Antalya, Turkey
30 April 2005
Red clay (outdoors)

Portugal
2

			1	2	3
1	(Bosnia and Herzegovina) (Portugal)	Sanja Račić; Ana Catarina Nogueira	7; 5	6; 1
2	(Bosnia and Herzegovina) (Portugal)	Selma Babić; Neuza Silva	3; 6	0; 6
3	(Bosnia and Herzegovina) (Portugal)	Selma Babić / Sanja Račić; Ana Catarina Nogueira / Neuza Silva	1; 6	3; 6

== Fifth to Seventh play-off ==
The second placed teams of each pool were placed against each other in two ties. The winner of each tie was allocated fifth place in the Group while the losers were allocated seventh.

=== Egypt vs. Botswana ===
Egypt
3
Club Ali Bey, Manavgat, Antalya, Turkey
30 April 2005
Red clay (outdoors)

Botswana
0

			1	2	3
1	(Egypt) (Botswana)	Aliaa Fakhry; Lesedi Ramocha	6; 1	6; 4
2	(Egypt) (Botswana)	Nihal Tarek-Saleh; Laone Botshoma	6; 2	6; 0
3	(Egypt) (Botswana)	Miray Eshak / Nihal Tarek-Saleh; Laone Botshoma / Puleng Tlhophane	6; 1	6; 2

=== Namibia vs. Moldova ===
Namibia
2
Club Ali Bey, Manavgat, Antalya, Turkey
30 April 2005
Red clay (outdoors)

Moldova
1

			1	2	3
1	(Namibia) (Moldova)	Alet Boonzaaier; Olga Ćosić	6; 2	6; 1
2	(Namibia) (Moldova)	Elna De Villiers; Ina Sireţeanu	6; 4	6^{8} 7^{10}	3; 6
3	(Namibia) (Moldova)	Alet Boonzaaier / Suzelle Davin; Maria Melihova / Ina Sireţeanu	7; 5	6; 2

== Ninth and Eleventh play-off ==
The third placed teams of each pool were placed against each other in two ties. The winner of each tie was allocated ninth place in the Group while the losers were allocated eleventh.

=== Malta vs. Iceland ===
Malta
3
Club Ali Bey, Manavgat, Antalya, Turkey
30 April 2005
Red clay (outdoors)

Iceland
0

			1	2	3
1	(Malta) (Iceland)	Stephanie Pace; Rebekka Pétursdóttir	6; 0	6; 0
2	(Malta) (Iceland)	Stephanie Sullivan; Sigurlaug Sigurðardóttir	6; 3	6; 2
3	(Malta) (Iceland)	Stephanie Pace / Stephanie Sullivan; Rebekka Pétursdóttir / Sigurlaug Sigurðardóttir	7^{7} 6^{3}	6; 3

=== Cyprus vs. Kenya ===
Cyprus
0
Club Ali Bey, Manavgat, Antalya, Turkey
30 April 2005
Red clay (outdoors)

Kenya
3

			1	2	3
1	(Cyprus) (Kenya)	Ilina Kroushovski; Wanjika Ngaruiya	3; 6	5; 7
2	(Cyprus) (Kenya)	Irina Letseva; Evelyn Otula	2; 6	2; 6
3	(Cyprus) (Kenya)	Ilina Kroushovski / Irina Letseva; Caroline Oduor / Evelyn Otula	4; 6	4; 6

== Final Placements ==
Placing	Teams	
Promoted	Algeria	Portugal
Third	Turkey	Bosnia and Herzegovina
Fifth	Egypt	Namibia
Seventh	Botswana	Moldova
Ninth	Malta	Kenya
Eleventh	Iceland	Cyprus

- Algeria and Portugal advanced to the Europe/Africa Zone Group II for the next year. The Portuguese placed third overall, while the Algerians did not compete next year.

== See also ==
- Fed Cup structure
