= 2005 Fed Cup Europe/Africa Zone Group II – Pool B =

Group B of the 2005 Fed Cup Europe/Africa Zone Group II was one of two pools in the Europe/Africa Zone Group II of the 2005 Fed Cup. Four teams competed in a round robin competition, with the top two teams and the bottom two teams proceeding to their respective sections of the play-offs: the top teams play for advancement to Group I, while the bottom teams face potential relegation to Group III.

		(Republic of Ireland) IRL	(Latvia) LAT	(Georgia (country)) GEO	(Norway) NOR	RR; W–L	Set; W–L	Game; W–L	Standings
54	Ireland		1–2	0–3	3–0	1–2	10–11	96–97	3
57	Latvia	2–1		0–3	3–0	2–1	10–11	81–94	2
63	Georgia	3–0	3–0		2–1	3–0	16–2	101–42	1
64	Norway	0–3	0–3	1–2		0–3	4–16	62–107	4

== Ireland vs. Norway ==
Ireland
3
Club Ali Bey, Manavgat, Antalya, Turkey
27 April 2005
Red clay (outdoors)

Norway
0

			1	2	3
1	(Republic of Ireland) (Norway)	Yvonne Doyle; Ina Sartz	3; 6	6; 4	6; 3
2	(Republic of Ireland) (Norway)	Anne Mall; Karoline Borgersen	6; 3	6; 3
3	(Republic of Ireland) (Norway)	Anne Mall / Karen Nugent; Karoline Borgersen / Ina Sartz	6; 1	7^{7} 6^{3}

== Latvia vs. Georgia ==
Latvia
0
Club Ali Bey, Manavgat, Antalya, Turkey
27 April 2005
Red clay (outdoors)

Georgia
3

			1	2	3
1	(Latvia) (Georgia (country))	Anastasija Sevastova; Tinatin Kavlashvili	2; 6	1; 6
2	(Latvia) (Georgia (country))	Irina Kuzmina; Margalita Chakhnashvili	2; 6	1; 6
3	(Latvia) (Georgia (country))	Irina Kuzmina / Alise Vaidere; Tinatin Kavlashvili / Tatia Mikadze	0; 6	4; 6

== Ireland vs. Georgia ==
Ireland
0
Club Ali Bey, Manavgat, Antalya, Turkey
28 April 2005
Red clay (outdoors)

Georgia
3

			1	2	3
1	(Republic of Ireland) (Georgia (country))	Yvonne Doyle; Tinatin Kavlashvili	4; 6	1; 6
2	(Republic of Ireland) (Georgia (country))	Anne Mall; Margalita Chakhnashvili	4; 6	1; 6
3	(Republic of Ireland) (Georgia (country))	Rachael Dillon / Karen Nugent; Salome Chachkhunashvili / Tatia Mikadze	3; 6	4; 6

== Latvia vs. Norway ==
Latvia
3
Club Ali Bey, Manavgat, Antalya, Turkey
28 April 2005
Red clay (outdoors)

Norway
0

			1	2	3
1	(Latvia) (Norway)	Alise Vaidere; Ina Sartz	6; 1	6; 3
2	(Latvia) (Norway)	Irina Kuzmina; Karoline Borgersen	6; 1	2; 6	6; 4
3	(Latvia) (Norway)	Ieva Irbe / Alise Vaidere; Idunn Hertzberg / Karoline Steiro	6; 2	6; 2

== Ireland vs. Latvia ==
Ireland
1
Club Ali Bey, Manavgat, Antalya, Turkey
29 April 2005
Red clay (outdoors)

Latvia
2

			1	2	3
1	(Republic of Ireland) (Latvia)	Yvonne Doyle; Alise Vaidere	3; 6	6; 3	3; 6
2	(Republic of Ireland) (Latvia)	Anne Mall; Irina Kuzmina	6; 4	6^{4} 7^{7}	3; 6
3	(Republic of Ireland) (Latvia)	Rachael Dillon / Karen Nugent; Ieva Irbe / Anastasija Sevastova	6; 0	6; 3

== Georgia vs. Norway ==
Georgia
2
Club Ali Bey, Manavgat, Antalya, Turkey
29 April 2005
Red clay (outdoors)

Norway
1

			1	2	3
1	(Georgia (country)) (Norway)	Tinatin Kavlashvili; Karoline Steiro	6; 0	6; 1
2	(Georgia (country)) (Norway)	Margalita Chakhnashvili; Idunn Hertzberg	6; 2	6; 2
3	(Georgia (country)) (Norway)	Salome Chachkhunashvili / Tatia Mikadze; Karoline Borgersen / Ina Sartz	1; 6	4; 6

== See also ==
- Fed Cup structure
