= 2005 Fed Cup Europe/Africa Zone Group II – play-offs =

International tennis competition play-offs

The play-offs of the 2005 Fed Cup Europe/Africa Zone Group II were the final stages of the Group I Zonal Competition involving teams from Europe and Africa. Using the positions determined in their pools, the sixteen teams faced off to determine their placing in the 2005 Fed Cup Europe/Africa Zone Group II. The top two teams advanced to Group I, and the bottom two teams were relegated down to the Group III for the next year.

Placing	Pool A	Pool B
1	Romania	Georgia
2	Finland	Latvia
3	Lithuania	Ireland
4	Tunisia	Norway

== Promotion play-offs ==
The top two teams of each pool were placed against each other in two head-to-head rounds. The winner of the rounds advanced to Group I for next year.

=== Romania vs. Latvia ===
Romania
2
Club Ali Bey, Manavgat, Antalya, Turkey
30 April 2005
Red clay (outdoors)

Latvia
1

			1	2	3
1	(Romania) (Latvia)	Monica Niculescu; Alise Vaidere	6; 0	6; 3
2	(Romania) (Latvia)	Simona Matei; Irina Kuzmina	4; 6	6; 4	4; 6
3	(Romania) (Latvia)	Gabriela Niculescu / Monica Niculescu; Irina Kuzmina / Anastasija Sevastova	7; 5	6; 3

=== Finland vs. Georgia ===
Finland
2
Club Ali Bey, Manavgat, Antalya, Turkey
30 April 2005
Red clay (outdoors)

Georgia
1

			1	2	3
1	(Finland) (Georgia (country))	Piia Suomalainen; Tinatin Kavlashvili	1; 6	6^{4} 7^{7}
2	(Finland) (Georgia (country))	Emma Laine; Margalita Chakhnashvili	6; 4	6; 1
3	(Finland) (Georgia (country))	Emma Laine / Piia Suomalainen; Tinatin Kavlashvili / Tatia Mikadze	6; 2	6; 3

== Relegation play-offs ==
The last placed teams of each pool were placed against each other in two ties. The losing team of the rounds were relegated to Group III for next year.

=== Lithuania vs. Norway ===
Lithuania
2
Club Ali Bey, Manavgat, Antalya, Turkey
30 April 2005
Red clay (outdoors)

Norway
0

			1	2	3
1	(Lithuania) (Norway)	Aurelija Misevičiūtė; Idunn Hertzberg	6; 2	6; 0
2	(Lithuania) (Norway)	Lina Stančiūtė; Karoline Borgersen	6; 3	6; 4
3	(Lithuania) (Norway)					not played

=== Tunisia vs. Ireland ===
Tunisia
0
Club Ali Bey, Manavgat, Antalya, Turkey
30 April 2005
Red clay (outdoors)

Ireland
2

			1	2	3
1	(Tunisia) (Republic of Ireland)	Selima Frioui; Yvonne Doyle	1; 6	1; 6
2	(Tunisia) (Republic of Ireland)	Olfa Dhaoui; Anne Mall	1; 6	1; 6
3	(Tunisia) (Republic of Ireland)					not played

== Final Placements ==
Placing	Teams	
Promoted	Romania	Finland
Third	Latvia	Georgia
Fifth	Lithuania	Ireland
Relegated	Norway	Tunisia

- Romania and Finland advanced to the Europe/Africa Zone Group I for the next year. The Romanians placed second in their pool of five, while the Finns placed last in their pool of four and thus faced relegation back to Group II for 2007.
- Norway and Tunisia were relegated down to Europe/Africa Zone Group III for the next year. The Norwegians and Tunisians respectively placed first and third in the same pool of five, meaning that Tunisia would remain in Group III for 2007, while Norway would advance back to Group II.

== See also ==
- Fed Cup structure
