= 2005 Fed Cup Europe/Africa Zone Group II – Pool A =

International tennis competition

Group A of the 2005 Fed Cup Europe/Africa Zone Group II was one of two pools in the Europe/Africa Zone Group II of the 2005 Fed Cup. Four teams competed in a round robin competition, with the top two teams and the bottom two teams proceeding to their respective sections of the play-offs: the top teams play for advancement to Group I, while the bottom teams face potential relegation to Group III.

		(Finland) FIN	(Romania) ROU	(Lithuania) LTU	(Tunisia) TUN	RR; W–L	Set; W–L	Game; W–L	Standings
53	Finland		1–2	2–1	3–0	2–1	13–6	92–64	2
60	Romania	2–1		2–1	3–0	3–0	15–7	114–69	1
65	Lithuania	1–2	1–2		3–0	1–2	12–9	101–75	3
71	Tunisia	0–3	0–3	0–3		0–3	0–18	9–108	4

== Finland vs. Lithuania ==
Finland
2
Club Ali Bey, Manavgat, Antalya, Turkey
27 April 2005
Red clay (outdoors)

Lithuania
1

			1	2	3
1	(Finland) (Lithuania)	Piia Suomalainen; Aurelija Misevičiūtė	3; 6	2; 6
2	(Finland) (Lithuania)	Emma Laine; Lina Stančiūtė	6; 4	6; 2
3	(Finland) (Lithuania)	Emma Laine / Piia Suomalainen; Aurelija Misevičiūtė / Lina Stančiūtė	6; 4	6; 4

== Romania vs. Tunisia ==
Romania
3
Club Ali Bey, Manavgat, Antalya, Turkey
27 April 2005
Red clay (outdoors)

Tunisia
0

			1	2	3
1	(Romania) (Tunisia)	Gabriela Niculescu; Rym Cherni	6; 0	6; 2
2	(Romania) (Tunisia)	Simona Matei; Olfa Dhaoui	6; 0	6; 1
3	(Romania) (Tunisia)	Gabriela Niculescu / Monica Niculescu; Olfa Dhaoui / Selima Frioui	6; 0	6; 0

== Finland vs. Romania ==
Finland
1
Club Ali Bey, Manavgat, Antalya, Turkey
28 April 2005
Red clay (outdoors)

Romania
2

			1	2	3
1	(Finland) (Romania)	Piia Suomalainen; Monica Niculescu	2; 6	0; 6
2	(Finland) (Romania)	Emma Laine; Simona Matei	7; 5	6; 3
3	(Finland) (Romania)	Emma Laine / Piia Suomalainen; Gabriela Niculescu / Monica Niculescu	6; 2	3; 6	3; 6

== Lithuania vs. Tunisia ==
Lithuania
2
Club Ali Bey, Manavgat, Antalya, Turkey
28 April 2005
Red clay (outdoors)

Tunisia
1

			1	2	3
1	(Lithuania) (Tunisia)	Aurelija Misevičiūtė; Selima Frioui	6; 0	6; 0
2	(Lithuania) (Tunisia)	Lina Stančiūtė; Olfa Dhaoui	6; 0	6; 1
3	(Lithuania) (Tunisia)	Irina Cybina / Lina Stančiūtė; Rym Cherni / Olfa Dhaoui	6; 0	6; 1

== Finland vs. Tunisia ==
Finland
2
Club Ali Bey, Manavgat, Antalya, Turkey
29 April 2005
Red clay (outdoors)

Tunisia
1

			1	2	3
1	(Finland) (Tunisia)	Piia Suomalainen; Rym Cherni	6; 0	6; 0
2	(Finland) (Tunisia)	Emma Laine; Olfa Dhaoui	6; 1	6; 1
3	(Finland) (Tunisia)	Emma Laine / Maarit Nieminen; Olfa Dhaoui / Selima Frioui	6; 1	6; 1

== Romania vs. Lithuania ==
Romania
2
Club Ali Bey, Manavgat, Antalya, Turkey
29 April 2005
Red clay (outdoors)

Lithuania
1

			1	2	3
1	(Romania) (Lithuania)	Monica Niculescu; Aurelija Misevičiūtė	3; 6	6; 1	6; 2
2	(Romania) (Lithuania)	Simona Matei; Lina Stančiūtė	6; 4	5; 7	2; 6
3	(Romania) (Lithuania)	Gabriela Niculescu / Monica Niculescu; Aurelija Misevičiūtė / Lina Stančiūtė	3; 6	7^{7} 6^{0}	6; 1

== See also ==
- Fed Cup structure
