= Helena Bešović =

Bosnian tennis player

- Country (sports): Bosnia and Herzegovina
- Born: 28 September 1984 (age 40); Bihać, SR Bosnia and Herzegovina, Yugoslavia
- Turned pro: 1999
- Retired: 2008
- Plays: Right-handed (two-handed backhand)
- Prize money: $8,624

Singles
- Career record: 29–27
- Career titles: 0
- Highest ranking: No. 733 (11 June 2007)

Doubles
- Career record: 21–12
- Career titles: 3 ITF
- Highest ranking: No. 631 (6 August 2007)

Helena Bešović (born 28 September 1984) is a former Bosnian tennis player and former head coach of the University of Houston women's tennis team.

During her career, she won three doubles titles on the ITF Circuit, and reached best WTA rankings of 733 in singles and 631 in doubles.

Playing for Bosnia and Herzegovina in Fed Cup competitions, Bešović has a win–loss record of 5–3.

== ITF Circuit finals ==
$25,000 tournaments
$10,000 tournaments

=== Singles (0–3) ===
Result	No.	Date	Tournament	Surface	Opponent	Score
Loss	1	9 July 2006	ITF Southlake, United States	Hard	(United States) Ashley Weinhold	6–3, 3–6, 3–6
Loss	2	27 May 2007	ITF El Paso, United States	Hard	(Venezuela) Gabriela Paz	3–6, 0–6
Loss	3	29 July 2007	ITF Evansville, United States	Hard	(United States) Kimberly Couts	6–7^{(3–7)}, 5–7

=== Doubles (3–1) ===
Result	No.	Date	Tournament	Surface	Partner	Opponents	Score
Win	1	3 September 2001	ITF Mollerussa, Spain	Hard	(Spain) Núria Roig	(Spain) María José Sánchez Alayeto (Spain) María Pilar Sánchez Alayeto	7–6^{(2)}, 6–3
Win	2	27 May 2007	ITF El Paso, United States	Hard	(Norway) Nina Munch-Søgaard	(United States) Ashlee Brown (United States) Sabrina Capannolo	5–7, 6–3, 7–6^{(1)}
Win	3	29 May 2007	ITF Houston, United States	Hard	(Norway) Nina Munch-Søgaard	(United States) Kimberly Couts (United States) Christina McHale	7–6^{(2)}, 7–5
Loss	1	29 July 2007	ITF Evansville, United States	Hard	(Norway) Nina Munch-Søgaard	(United States) Jenna Long (United States) Anna Lubinsky	1–6, 6–3, 2–6

== Fed Cup participation ==
=== Singles (3–0) ===
Edition	Date	Location	Against	Surface	Opponent	W/L	Score
2001 Fed Cup; Europe/Africa Zone II	14 May 2001	Antalya, Turkey	(Egypt) Egypt	Clay	(Egypt) Noha Mohsen	W	6–2, 6–4
2001 Fed Cup; Europe/Africa Zone II	14 May 2001	Antalya, Turkey	Lesotho	Clay	(Lesotho) Liako Selokoma	W	6–0, 6–0
2001 Fed Cup; Europe/Africa Zone II	17 May 2001	Antalya, Turkey	Armenia	Clay	(Armenia) Tatevik Babayan	W	6–3, 6–2

=== Doubles (2–3) ===
Edition	Date	Location	Against	Surface	Partner	Opponents	W/L	Score
2001 Fed Cup; Europe/Africa Zone II	14 May 2001	Antalya, Turkey	(Egypt) Egypt	Clay	(Bosnia and Herzegovina) Mervana Jugić-Salkić	(Egypt) Nermien Abaza (Egypt) Rawya Seif	W	6–3, 6–0
2001 Fed Cup; Europe/Africa Zone II	23 April 2003	Antalya, Turkey	Kenya	Clay	(Bosnia and Herzegovina) Lejla Husić	(Kenya) Esther Mbugua (Kenya) Florence Mbugua	W	6–0, 6–2
2002 Fed Cup; Europe/Africa Zone I	24 April 2002	Antalya, Turkey	(Netherlands) Netherlands	Clay	(Bosnia and Herzegovina) Maja Mešanović	(Netherlands) Kristie Boogert (Netherlands) Seda Noorlander	L	1–6, 4–6
2002 Fed Cup; Europe/Africa Zone I	25 April 2002	Antalya, Turkey	Israel	Clay	(Bosnia and Herzegovina) Maja Mešanović	(Israel) Tzipora Obziler (Israel) Hila Rosen	L	0–6, 1–6
2002 Fed Cup; Europe/Africa Zone I	26 April 2002	Antalya, Turkey	Romania	Clay	(Bosnia and Herzegovina) Maja Mešanović	(Romania) Raluca Ciochină (Romania) Magda Mihalache	L	2–6, 5–7
