= 2005 Fed Cup Europe/Africa Zone =

Subsection of tennis competition

The Europe/Africa Zone was one of three zones of regional competition in the 2005 Fed Cup.

== Group I ==
- Venue: Club Ali Bey, Manavgat, Antalya, Turkey (outdoor clay)
- Dates: 20–23 April

The sixteen teams were divided into four pools of four teams. The top teams of each pool played-off against each other to decide which two nations progress to World Group II Play-offs. The four nations coming last played-off against each other to decide which teams are relegated to Group II for 2006.

=== Pools ===
	Pool A	BUL	RSA	HUN	EST
1	Bulgaria (3–0)		3–0	2–1	3–0
2	South Africa (2–1)	0–3		2–1	3–0
3	Hungary (1–2)	1–2	1–2		3–0
4	Estonia (0–3)	0–3	0–3	0–3	

	Pool B	NED	SWE	LUX	POL
1	Netherlands (3–0)		2–1	3–0	3–0
2	Sweden (2–1)	1–2		2–1	2–1
3	Luxembourg (1–2)	0–3	1–2		2–1
4	Poland (0–3)	0–3	1–2	1–2	

	Pool C	SLO	SCG	GBR	DEN
1	Slovenia (2–1)		2–1	3–0	1–2
2	Serbia and Montenegro (2–1)	1–2		2–1	3–0
3	Great Britain (1–2)	0–3	1–2		2–1
4	Denmark (1–2)	2–1	0–3	1–2	

	Pool D	BLR	ISR	UKR	GRE
1	Belarus (3–0)		2–1	2–1	3–0
2	Israel (2–1)	1–2		3–0	3–0
3	Ukraine (1–2)	1–2	0–3		3–0
4	Greece (0–3)	0–3	0–3	0–3	

=== Play-offs ===
Placing	A Team	Score	B Team
Promotion	Bulgaria	2–0	Netherlands
5th–7th	South Africa	2–1	Sweden
9th–11th	Hungary	1–2	Luxembourg
Relegation	Estonia	3–0	Poland

Placing	C Team	Score	D Team
Promotion	Slovenia	2–1	Belarus
5th–7th	Serbia and Montenegro	0–2	Israel
9th–11th	Great Britain	1–2	Ukraine
Relegation	Denmark	2–1	Greece

- Bulgaria and Slovenia advanced to World Group II Play-offs.
- Greece and Poland were relegated to Zonal Group II for 2006.

== Group II ==
- Venue: Club Ali Bey, Manavgat, Antalya, Turkey (outdoor hard)
- Dates: 27–30 April

The eight teams were divided into two pools of four teams. The top two teams of each pool played-off against each other to decide which two nations progress to Group I for 2006. The four nations coming last played-off against each other to decide which teams are relegated to Group III for the next year.

=== Pools ===
	Pool A	ROU	FIN	LTU	TUN
1	Romania (3–0)		2–1	2–1	3–0
2	Finland (2–1)	1–2		2–1	3–0
3	Lithuania (1–2)	1–2	1–2		3–0
4	Tunisia (0–3)	0–3	0–3	0–3	

	Pool B	GEO	LAT	IRL	NOR
1	Georgia (3–0)		3–0	3–0	2–1
2	Latvia (2–1)	0–3		2–1	3–0
3	Ireland (1–2)	0–3	1–2		3–0
4	Norway (0–3)	1–2	0–3	0–3	

=== Play-offs ===
Placing	A Team	Score	B Team
Promotion	Romania	2–1	Latvia
Promotion	Finland	2–1	Georgia
Relegation	Lithuania	2–0	Norway
Relegation	Tunisia	0–2	Ireland

- Romania and Finland advanced to Group I for 2006.
- Norway and Tunisia was relegated to Group III for 2006.

== Group III ==
- Venue: Club Ali Bey, Manavgat, Antalya, Turkey (outdoor hard)
- Dates: 27–30 April

The twelve teams were divided into four pools of three teams. The top team of each pool played-off against each other to decide which two nations progress to Group II for 2006.

=== Pools ===
	Pool A	TUR	EGY	MLT
1	Turkey (2–0)		2–1	3–0
2	Egypt (1–1)	1–2		3–0
3	Malta (0–2)	0–3	0–3	

	Pool B	ALG	BOT	ISL
1	Algeria (2–0)		3–0	3–0
2	Botswana (1–1)	0–3		3–0
3	Iceland (0–2)	0–3	0–3	

	Pool C	BIH	NAM	CYP
1	Bosnia and Herzegovina (2–0)		2–1	3–0
2	Namibia (1–1)	1–2		3–0
3	Cyprus (0–2)	0–3	0–3	

	Pool D	POR	MDA	KEN
1	Portugal (2–0)		2–1	3–0
2	Moldova (1–1)	1–2		3–0
3	Kenya (0–2)	0–3	0–3	

=== Play-offs ===
Placing	A Team	Score	B Team
Promotion	Turkey	1–2	Algeria
5th–7th	Egypt	3–0	Botswana
9th–11th	Malta	3–0	Iceland

Placing	C Team	Score	D Team
Promotion	Bosnia and Herzegovina	1–2	Portugal
5th–7th	Namibia	2–1	Moldova
9th–11th	Cyprus	0–3	Kenya

- Algeria and Portugal advanced to Group II for 2006.

== See also ==
- Fed Cup structure
