= 2011 Fed Cup Europe/Africa Zone Group III – Pool A =

Pool in zone of tennis competition

Group A of the 2011 Fed Cup Europe/Africa Zone Group III was one of four pools in the Europe/Africa zone of the 2011 Fed Cup. Four teams competed in a round robin competition, with the top two teams and the bottom teams proceeding to their respective sections of the play-offs: the top teams played for advancement to the Group II.

		(South Africa) RSA	(Algeria) ALG	(Lithuania) LIT	(Montenegro) MNE	Match; W–L	Set; W–L	Game; W–L	Standings; W–L
58	South Africa		3–0	3−0	2–1	3–0	16–3	111–56	1
78	Algeria	0–3		0–3	0–3	0–3	0–18	35–109	4
81	Lithuania	0–3	3–0		0–3	1–2	7-12	86–79	3
88	Montenegro	1–2	3–0	3–0		2–1	14-4	90–60	2

== South Africa vs. Algeria ==
South Africa
3
Smash Tennis Academy, Cairo, Egypt
May 4, 2011
Red clay (outdoors)

Algeria
0

			1	2	3
1	(South Africa) (Algeria)	Natalie Grandin; Samia Medjahdi	6; 1	6; 2
2	(South Africa) (Algeria)	Chanel Simmonds; Assia Halo	7^{7} 6^{4}	6; 2
3	(South Africa) (Algeria)	Natalie Grandin / Chanel Simmonds; Fatima Zorah Bouabdallah / Assia Halo	6; 3	6; 4

== Lithuania vs. Montenegro ==
Lithuania
0
Smash Tennis Academy, Cairo, Egypt
May 4, 2011
Red clay (outdoors)

Montenegro
3

			1	2	3
1	(Lithuania) (Montenegro)	Joana Eidukonyte; Danica Krstajić	3; 6	1; 6
2	(Lithuania) (Montenegro)	Lina Stančiūtė; Danka Kovinić	3; 6	6^{4} 7^{7}
3	(Lithuania) (Montenegro)	Aurelija Misevičiūtė / Lina Padegimaite; Danka Kovinić / Danica Krstajić	3; 6	4; 6

== Lithuania vs. South Africa ==
Lithuania
0
Smash Tennis Academy, Cairo, Egypt
May 5, 2011
Red clay (outdoors)

South Africa
3

			1	2	3
1	(Lithuania) (South Africa)	Aurelija Misevičiūtė; Natalie Grandin	2; 6	0; 6
2	(Lithuania) (South Africa)	Lina Stančiūtė; Chanel Simmonds	0; 6	2; 6
3	(Lithuania) (South Africa)	Aurelija Misevičiūtė / Lina Padegimaite; Natalie Grandin / Madrie Le Roux	5; 7	6; 4	6^{1} 7

== Algeria vs. Montenegro ==
Algeria
0
Smash Tennis Academy, Cairo, Egypt
May 5, 2011
Red clay (outdoors)

Montenegro
3

			1	2	3
1	(Algeria) (Montenegro)	Assia Halo; Danica Krstajić	1; 6	1; 6
2	(Algeria) (Montenegro)	Fatima Zorah Bouabdallah; Danka Kovinić	1; 6	2; 6
3	(Algeria) (Montenegro)	Assia Halo / Samia Medjahdi; Danka Kovinić / Danica Krstajić	1; 6	2; 6

== South Africa vs. Montenegro ==
South Africa
2
Smash Tennis Academy, Cairo, Egypt
May 5, 2011
Red clay (outdoors)

Montenegro
1

			1	2	3
1	(South Africa) (Montenegro)	Natalie Grandin; Danica Krstajić	4; 6	4; 6
2	(South Africa) (Montenegro)	Chanel Simmonds; Danka Kovinić	6; 3	6; 1
3	(South Africa) (Montenegro)	Natalie Grandin / Chanel Simmonds; Vladica Babić / Tamara Stanić	6; 1	6; 0

== Algeria vs. Lithuania ==
Algeria
0
Smash Tennis Academy, Cairo, Egypt
May 5, 2011
Red clay (outdoors)

Lithuania
3

			1	2	3
1	(Algeria) (Lithuania)	Samia Medjahdi; Joana Eidukonyte	1; 6	3; 6
2	(Algeria) (Lithuania)	Fatima Zorah Bouabdallah; Lina Stančiūtė	1; 6	0; 6
3	(Algeria) (Lithuania)	Fatima Zohra Boukezzi / Assia Halo; Aurelija Misevičiūtė / Lina Padegimaite	2; 6	2; 6

== See also ==
- Fed Cup structure
