= 2004 Fed Cup Europe/Africa Zone Group I – Pool A =

Group A of the 2004 Fed Cup Europe/Africa Zone Group I was one of four pools in the Europe/Africa Zone Group I of the 2004 Fed Cup. Three teams competed in a round robin competition, with the top two teams advancing to the advancement play-offs and the bottom team being relegated down to the relegation play-offs.

		(Sweden) SWE	(Serbia and Montenegro) SCG	(Lithuania) LTU	RR; W–L	Set; W–L	Game; W–L	Standings
23	Sweden		0–3	3–0	1–1	8–6	69–59	2
32	Serbia and Montenegro	3–0		3–0	2–0	12–2	83–45	1
54	Lithuania	0–3	0–3		0–2	0–12	27–75	3

== Sweden vs. Lithuania ==
Sweden
3
Athens Lawn Tennis Club, Athens, Greece
19 April 2004
Red clay (outdoors)

Lithuania
0

			1	2	3
1	(Sweden) (Lithuania)	Hanna Nooni; Edita Liachovičiūtė	6; 1	6; 0
2	(Sweden) (Lithuania)	Sofia Arvidsson; Lina Stančiūtė	7; 5	6; 2
3	(Sweden) (Lithuania)	Sofia Arvidsson / Hanna Nooni; Edita Liachovičiūtė / Lina Stančiūtė	6; 0	7; 5

== Serbia and Montenegro vs. Lithuania ==
Serbia and Montenegro
3
Athens Lawn Tennis Club, Athens, Greece
20 April 2004
Red clay (outdoors)

Lithuania
0

			1	2	3
1	(Serbia and Montenegro) (Lithuania)	Jelena Janković; Edita Liachovičiūtė	6; 1	6; 4
2	(Serbia and Montenegro) (Lithuania)	Jelena Dokić; Lina Stančiūtė	6; 0	6; 4
3	(Serbia and Montenegro) (Lithuania)	Ana Timotić / Dragana Zarić; Edita Liachovičiūtė / Lina Stančiūtė	7; 5	6; 3

== Sweden vs. Serbia and Montenegro ==
Sweden
0
Athens Lawn Tennis Club, Athens, Greece
22 April 2004
Red clay (outdoors)

Serbia and Montenegro
3

			1	2	3
1	(Sweden) (Serbia and Montenegro)	Hanna Nooni; Jelena Janković	6; 3	5; 7	3; 6
2	(Sweden) (Serbia and Montenegro)	Sofia Arvidsson; Jelena Dokić	7; 5	5; 7	3; 6
3	(Sweden) (Serbia and Montenegro)	Michaela Johansson / Nadja Roma; Jelena Janković / Ana Timotić	2; 6	0; 6

== See also ==
- Fed Cup structure
