= 2004 Fed Cup Europe/Africa Zone Group I – Pool B =

Group B of the 2004 Fed Cup Europe/Africa Zone Group I was one of four pools in the Europe/Africa Zone Group I of the 2004 Fed Cup. Three teams competed in a round robin competition, with the top two teams advancing to the advancement play-offs and the bottom team being relegated down to the relegation play-offs.

		(Israel) ISR	(Netherlands) NED	(South Africa) RSA	(Ukraine) UKR	RR; W–L	Set; W–L	Game; W–L	Standings
19	Israel		3–0	2–1	0–3	2–1	10–7	83–71	2
25	Netherlands	0–3		2–1	1–2	1–2	7–14	90–115	3
27	South Africa	1–2	1–2		1–2	0–3	8–12	81–103	4
28	Ukraine	3–0	2–1	2–1		3–0	12–4	94–59	1

== Israel vs. Netherlands ==
Israel
2
Athens Lawn Tennis Club, Athens, Greece
19 April 2004
Red clay (outdoors)

Netherlands
1

			1	2	3
1	(Israel) (Netherlands)	Tzipora Obziler; Anousjka van Exel	7; 5	6; 4
2	(Israel) (Netherlands)	Anna Smashnova; Elise Tamaëla	6; 1	6; 2
3	(Israel) (Netherlands)	Tzipora Obziler / Anna Smashnova; Michaëlla Krajicek / Anousjka van Exel	3; 6	7; 5	6; 1

== South Africa vs. Ukraine ==
South Africa
1
Athens Lawn Tennis Club, Athens, Greece
20 April 2004
Red clay (outdoors)

Ukraine
2

			1	2	3
1	(South Africa) (Ukraine)	Nicole Rencken; Elena Tatarkova	4; 6	1; 6
2	(South Africa) (Ukraine)	Natalie Grandin; Yuliya Beygelzimer	7; 5	7; 5
3	(South Africa) (Ukraine)	Natalie Grandin / Nicole Rencken; Mariya Koryttseva / Olga Savchuk	0; 6	1; 6

== Israel vs. South Africa ==
Israel
2
Athens Lawn Tennis Club, Athens, Greece
21 April 2004
Red clay (outdoors)

South Africa
1

			1	2	3
1	(Israel) (South Africa)	Tzipora Obziler; Chanelle Scheepers	6; 1	6; 4
2	(Israel) (South Africa)	Anna Smashnova; Nicole Rencken	6; 1	6; 1
3	(Israel) (South Africa)	Shahar Pe'er / Anna Smashnova; Natalie Grandin / Nicole Rencken	1; 6	3; 6

== Netherlands vs. Ukraine ==
Netherlands
1
Athens Lawn Tennis Club, Athens, Greece
21 April 2004
Red clay (outdoors)

Ukraine
2

			1	2	3
1	(Netherlands) (Ukraine)	Michaëlla Krajicek; Elena Tatarkova	2; 6	3; 6
2	(Netherlands) (Ukraine)	Elise Tamaëla; Yuliya Beygelzimer	2; 6	6^{4} 7^{7}
3	(Netherlands) (Ukraine)	Tessy van de Ven / Anousjka van Exel; Mariya Koryttseva / Olga Savchuk	6; 3	6; 4

== Netherlands vs. South Africa ==
Netherlands
2
Athens Lawn Tennis Club, Athens, Greece
22 April 2004
Red clay (outdoors)

South Africa
1

			1	2	3
1	(Netherlands) (South Africa)	Michaëlla Krajicek; Chanelle Scheepers	7; 5	2; 6	6; 2
2	(Netherlands) (South Africa)	Elise Tamaëla; Natalie Grandin	6; 2	4; 6	11; 9
3	(Netherlands) (South Africa)	Tessy van de Ven / Anousjka van Exel; Nicole Rencken / Chanelle Scheepers	3; 6	2; 6

== Israel vs. Ukraine ==
Israel
0
Athens Lawn Tennis Club, Athens, Greece
23 April 2004
Red clay (outdoors)

Ukraine
3

			1	2	3
1	(Israel) (Ukraine)	Shahar Pe'er; Elena Tatarkova	4; 6	2; 6
2	(Israel) (Ukraine)	Tzipora Obziler; Yuliya Beygelzimer	3; 6	1; 6
3	(Israel) (Ukraine)	Shahar Pe'er / Anna Smashnova; Mariya Koryttseva / Olga Savchuk	4; 4			retired

== See also ==
- Fed Cup structure
