= 2004 Fed Cup Europe/Africa Zone Group I – Pool C =

Group C of the 2004 Fed Cup Europe/Africa Zone Group I was one of four pools in the Europe/Africa Zone Group I of the 2004 Fed Cup. Three teams competed in a round robin competition, with the top two teams advancing to the advancement play-offs and the bottom team being relegated down to the relegation play-offs.

		(Hungary) HUN	(Belarus) BLR	(Denmark) DEN	RR; W–L	Set; W–L	Game; W–L	Standings
22	Hungary		0–3	3–0	1–1	6–7	54–59	2
34	Belarus	3–0		3–0	2–0	12–0	72–23	1
35	Denmark	0–3	0–3		0–2	1–12	34–78	3

== Belarus vs. Denmark ==
Belarus
3
Athens Lawn Tennis Club, Athens, Greece
19 April 2004
Red clay (outdoors)

Denmark
0

			1	2	3
1	(Belarus) (Denmark)	Tatsiana Uvarova; Maria Rasmussen	6; 1	6; 1
2	(Belarus) (Denmark)	Tatiana Poutchek; Karina-Ildor Jacobsgaard	6; 2	6; 2
3	(Belarus) (Denmark)	Darya Kustova / Anastasiya Yakimova; Mette Iversen / Karina-Ildor Jacobsgaard	6; 1	6; 4

== Hungary vs. Denmark ==
Hungary
3
Athens Lawn Tennis Club, Athens, Greece
20 April 2004
Red clay (outdoors)

Denmark
0

			1	2	3
1	(Hungary) (Denmark)	Kira Nagy; Mette Iversen	6; 0	6; 2
2	(Hungary) (Denmark)	Melinda Czink; Karina-Ildor Jacobsgaard	6; 1	6; 2
3	(Hungary) (Denmark)	Melinda Czink / Katalin Marosi; Mette Iversen / Karina-Ildor Jacobsgaard	7^{7} 6^{4}	3; 6	8; 6

== Belarus vs. Hungary ==
Belarus
3
Athens Lawn Tennis Club, Athens, Greece
22 April 2004
Red clay (outdoors)

Hungary
0

			1	2	3
1	(Belarus) (Hungary)	Tatsiana Uvarova; Kira Nagy	6; 3	6; 0
2	(Belarus) (Hungary)	Anastasiya Yakimova; Melinda Czink	6; 1	6; 0
3	(Belarus) (Hungary)	Darya Kustova / Tatiana Poutchek; Katalin Marosi / Kira Nagy	6; 4	6; 4

== See also ==
- Fed Cup structure
