= 2018 Fed Cup Europe/Africa Zone Group II – Pool B =

Subsection of tennis competition

Group B of the 2018 Fed Cup Europe/Africa Zone Group II was one of two pools in the Europe/Africa zone of the 2018 Fed Cup. Four teams competed in a round robin competition, with the top two teams and the bottom two teams proceeding to their respective sections of the play-offs: the top two teams played for advancement to Group I, while the third placed team faced potential relegation to Group III. The bottom placing team was automatically relegated to Group III.

== Standings ==
		ISR	LUX	BIH	NOR	RR; W–L	Set; W–L	Game; W–L	Standings
6	Israel		2–1	2–1	1–2	2–1	13–10 (57%)	123–98 (56%)	1
7	Luxembourg	1–2		2–1	3–0	2–1	12–9 (57%)	104–94 (53%)	2
4	Bosnia and Herzegovina	1–2	1–2		3–0	1–2	12–8 (60%)	95–81 (54%)	3
2	Norway	2–1	0–3	0–3		1–2	6–16 (27%)	76–125 (38%)	4

Standings are determined by: 1. number of wins; 2. if two teams have the same number of wins, head-to-head record; 3. if three teams have the same number of wins, (a) number of matches won in the group, then (b) percentage of sets won in the group, then (c) percentage of games won in the group, then (d) Fed Cup rankings.

== Round-robin ==
=== Norway vs. Israel ===
Norway
2
Tatoi Club, Athens, Greece
18 April
Clay

Israel
1

			1	2	3
1	(Norway) (Israel)	Astrid Wanja Brune Olsen; Vlada Ekshibarova	6^{2} 7^{7}	6; 4	7^{7} 6^{2}
2	(Norway) (Israel)	Malene Helgø; Julia Glushko	6; 4	3; 6	1; 6
3	(Norway) (Israel)	Astrid Wanja Brune Olsen / Malene Helgø; Julia Glushko / Lina Glushko	4; 6	6; 3	7^{7} 6^{3}

=== Bosnia and Herzegovina vs. Luxembourg ===
Bosnia and Herzegovina
1
Tatoi Club, Athens, Greece
18 April
Clay

Luxembourg
2

			1	2	3
1	(Bosnia and Herzegovina) (Luxembourg)	Jelena Simić; Eléonora Molinaro	6; 2	6; 4
2	(Bosnia and Herzegovina) (Luxembourg)	Dea Herdželaš; Mandy Minella	7; 5	5; 7	1; 6
3	(Bosnia and Herzegovina) (Luxembourg)	Dea Herdželaš / Anita Husarić; Mandy Minella / Eléonora Molinaro	5; 7	3; 6

=== Norway vs. Luxembourg ===
Norway
0
Tatoi Club, Athens, Greece
19 April
Clay

Luxembourg
3

			1	2	3
1	(Norway) (Luxembourg)	Astrid Wanja Brune Olsen; Eléonora Molinaro	0; 6	3; 6
2	(Norway) (Luxembourg)	Malene Helgø; Mandy Minella	6; 4	3; 6	3; 6
3	(Norway) (Luxembourg)	Lilly Elida Håseth / Malene Helgø; Tiffany Cornelius / Claudine Schaul	5; 7	1; 6

=== Bosnia and Herzegovina vs. Israel ===
Bosnia and Herzegovina
1
Tatoi Club, Athens, Greece
19 April
Clay

Israel
2

			1	2	3
1	(Bosnia and Herzegovina) (Israel)	Jelena Simić; Nicole Nadel	6; 3	6; 4
2	(Bosnia and Herzegovina) (Israel)	Dea Herdželaš; Julia Glushko	6; 4	2; 6	0; 6
3	(Bosnia and Herzegovina) (Israel)	Anita Husarić / Jelena Simić; Julia Glushko / Lina Glushko	4; 6	2; 6

=== Norway vs. Bosnia and Herzegovina ===
Norway
0
Tatoi Club, Athens, Greece
20 April
Clay

Bosnia and Herzegovina
3

			1	2	3
1	(Norway) (Bosnia and Herzegovina)	Astrid Wanja Brune Olsen; Jelena Simić	1; 6	0; 6
2	(Norway) (Bosnia and Herzegovina)	Malene Helgø; Dea Herdželaš	4; 6	2; 6
3	(Norway) (Bosnia and Herzegovina)	Astrid Wanja Brune Olsen / Malene Helgø; Dea Herdželaš / Jelena Simić	0; 6	2; 6

=== Israel vs. Luxembourg ===
Israel
2
Tatoi Club, Athens, Greece
20 April
Clay

Luxembourg
1

			1	2	3
1	(Israel) (Luxembourg)	Vlada Ekshibarova; Eléonora Molinaro	6^{5} 7^{7}	6; 2	3; 6
2	(Israel) (Luxembourg)	Julia Glushko; Mandy Minella	6; 2	6; 2
3	(Israel) (Luxembourg)	Julia Glushko / Lina Glushko; Mandy Minella / Claudine Schaul	7; 5	6; 2
