= 2004 Fed Cup Europe/Africa Zone Group III – Pool B =

Group B of the 2004 Fed Cup Europe/Africa Zone Group III was one of two pools in the Europe/Africa Zone Group III of the 2004 Fed Cup. Four teams competed in a round robin competition, with the top two teams and the bottom two teams proceeding to their respective sections of the play-offs: the top teams play for advancement to the Group II.

		(Malta) MLT	(Tunisia) TUN	(Kenya) KEN	(Botswana) BOT	RR; W–L	Set; W–L	Game; W–L	Standings
84	Malta		1–2	3–0	3–0	2–1	14–5	96–52	2
86	Tunisia	2–1		3–0	2–1	3–0	14–4	91–47	1
90	Kenya	0–3	0–3		1–2	0–3	2–16	38–100	4
96	Botswana	0–3	1–2	2–1		1–2	7–12	58–84	3

== Malta vs. Tunisia ==
Malta
1
Marsa, Malta
27 April 2004
Hard (outdoors)

Tunisia
2

			1	2	3
1	(Malta) (Tunisia)	Lisa Camenzuli; Ines Zouabi	6; 1	6; 0
2	(Malta) (Tunisia)	Sarah Wetz; Selima Sfar	0; 6	0; 6
3	(Malta) (Tunisia)	Lisa Camenzuli / Rosanne Dimech; Issem Essaies / Selima Sfar	4; 6	6^{7} 7^{9}

== Kenya vs. Botswana ==
Kenya
1
Marsa, Malta
27 April 2004
Hard (outdoors)

Botswana
2

			1	2	3
1	(Kenya) (Botswana)	Evelyn Otula; Tapiwa Marobela	1; 6	1; 6
2	(Kenya) (Botswana)	Wanjika Ngaruiya; Lesedi Ramocha	6; 3	6; 1
3	(Kenya) (Botswana)	Caroline Oduor / Evelyn Otula; Laone Botshoma / Tapiwa Marobela	3; 6	0; 6

== Malta vs. Botswana ==
Malta
3
Marsa, Malta
28 April 2004
Hard (outdoors)

Botswana
0

			1	2	3
1	(Malta) (Botswana)	Lisa Camenzuli; Laone Botshoma	6; 0	6; 0
2	(Malta) (Botswana)	Rosanne Dimech; Tapiwa Marobela	7^{7} 6^{5}	1; 6	6; 0
3	(Malta) (Botswana)	Lisa Camenzuli / Sarah Wetz; Laone Botshoma / Tapiwa Marobela	6; 1	6; 2

== Tunisia vs. Kenya ==
Tunisia
3
Marsa, Malta
28 April 2004
Hard (outdoors)

Kenya
0

			1	2	3
1	(Tunisia) (Kenya)	Ines Zouabi; Meera Kantaria	6; 2	6; 3
2	(Tunisia) (Kenya)	Selima Sfar; Wanjika Ngaruiya	6; 0	6; 0
3	(Tunisia) (Kenya)	Issem Essaies / Selima Frioui; Caroline Oduor / Evelyn Otula	6; 3	6; 2

== Malta vs. Kenya ==
Malta
3
Marsa, Malta
29 April 2004
Hard (outdoors)

Kenya
0

			1	2	3
1	(Malta) (Kenya)	Lisa Camenzuli; Meera Kantaria	6; 0	6; 1
2	(Malta) (Kenya)	Sarah Wetz; Wanjika Ngaruiya	6; 0	6; 3
3	(Malta) (Kenya)	Esther Muscat / Sarah Wetz; Caroline Oduor / Evelyn Otula	6; 3	6; 4

== Tunisia vs. Botswana ==
Tunisia
2
Marsa, Malta
29 April 2004
Hard (outdoors)

Botswana
1

			1	2	3
1	(Tunisia) (Botswana)	Ines Zouabi; Tapiwa Marobela	1; 6	4; 6
2	(Tunisia) (Botswana)	Selima Sfar; Lesedi Ramocha	6; 1	6; 1
3	(Tunisia) (Botswana)	Issem Essaies / Selima Sfar; Laone Botshoma / Tapiwa Marobela	6; 1	6; 0

== See also ==
- Fed Cup structure
