= Krstajić =

Krstajić is a Serbo-Croatian surname. Notable people with the surname include:

- Danica Krstajić (born 1987), former Montenegrin tennis player
- Mladen Krstajić (born 1974), former Serbian footballer
