= 2005 Fed Cup Europe/Africa Zone Group III – Pool C =

Group C of the 2005 Fed Cup Europe/Africa Zone Group III was one of four pools in the Europe/Africa Zone Group III of the 2005 Fed Cup. Three women's tennis teams competed in a round robin competition, with the top team and the bottom two teams proceeding to their respective sections of the play-offs: the top team will play for advancement to Group II.

		(Bosnia and Herzegovina) BIH	(Namibia) NAM	(Cyprus) CYP	RR; W–L	Set; W–L	Game; W–L	Standings
73	Bosnia and Herzegovina		2–1	3–0	2–0	11–2	77–36	1
91	Namibia	1–2		3–0	1–1	8–5	63–59	2
	Cyprus	0–3	0–3		0–2	0–12	27–72	3

== Namibia vs. Cyprus ==
Namibia
3
Club Ali Bey, Manavgat, Antalya, Turkey
27 April 2005
Red clay (outdoors)

Cyprus
0

			1	2	3
1	(Namibia) (Cyprus)	Suzelle Davin; Ilina Kroushovski	6; 4	6; 3
2	(Namibia) (Cyprus)	Elna De Villiers; Irina Letseva	6; 1	6; 3
3	(Namibia) (Cyprus)	Alet Boonzaaier / Suzelle Davin; Ilina Kroushovski / Stella Kyradji	6; 3	6; 4

== Bosnia and Herzegovina vs. Cyprus ==
Bosnia and Herzegovina
3
Club Ali Bey, Manavgat, Antalya, Turkey
28 April 2005
Red clay (outdoors)

Cyprus
0

			1	2	3
1	(Bosnia and Herzegovina) (Cyprus)	Selma Babić; Ilina Kroushovski	6; 2	6; 1
2	(Bosnia and Herzegovina) (Cyprus)	Dijana Stojić; Irina Letseva	6; 1	6; 1
3	(Bosnia and Herzegovina) (Cyprus)	Sanja Račić / Nadina Šećerbegović; Ilina Kroushovski / Stella Kyradji	6; 2	6; 2

== Bosnia and Herzegovina vs. Namibia ==
Bosnia and Herzegovina
2
Club Ali Bey, Manavgat, Antalya, Turkey
29 April 2005
Red clay (outdoors)

Namibia
1

			1	2	3
1	(Bosnia and Herzegovina) (Namibia)	Selma Babić; Suzelle Davin	6; 4	6; 4
2	(Bosnia and Herzegovina) (Namibia)	Dijana Stojić; Elna De Villiers	6; 1	6; 1
3	(Bosnia and Herzegovina) (Namibia)	Selma Babić / Nadina Šećerbegović; Alet Boonzaaier / Suzelle Davin	6; 2	5; 7	6; 8

== See also ==
- Fed Cup structure
