= 2001 Fed Cup Europe/Africa Zone Group II – Pool D =

International tennis competition

Group D of the 2001 Fed Cup Europe/Africa Zone Group II was one of four pools in the Europe/Africa zone of the 2001 Fed Cup. Five teams competed in a round robin competition, with the top team advancing to Group I for 2002.

	(Turkey) TUR	(Lithuania) LTU	(Moldova) MDA	(Tunisia) TUN	(Botswana) BOT	Match; W–L	Set; W–L	Game; W–L	Standings
Turkey		2–1	3–0	3–0	3–0	4–0	22–4	151–68	1
Lithuania	1–2		3–0	3–0	3–0	3–1	21–4	146–66	2
Moldova	0–3	0–3		3–0	2–1	2–2	11–16	118–160	3
Tunisia	0–3	0–3	0–3		2–1	1–3	5–20	54–100	4
Botswana	0–3	0–3	1–2	1–2		0–4	5–20	60–135	5

== Turkey vs. Botswana ==
Turkey
3
Belek, Antalya, Turkey
14 May 2001
Red clay (outdoors)

Botswana
0

			1	2	3
1	(Turkey) (Botswana)	Merve Asımgil; Tapiwa Marobela	6; 4	6; 0
2	(Turkey) (Botswana)	Duygu Akşit Oal; Kago Phatshwane	6; 1	6; 0
3	(Turkey) (Botswana)	Duygu Akşit Oal / Merve Asımgil; Kelesitse Makgale / Razalia Phethu	6; 2	6; 1

== Lithuania vs. Tunisia ==
Lithuania
3
Belek, Antalya, Turkey
14 May 2001
Red clay (outdoors)

Tunisia
0

			1	2	3
1	(Lithuania) (Tunisia)	Rūta Deduraitė; Meriem Zitouni	6; 0	6; 2
2	(Lithuania) (Tunisia)	Edita Liachovičiūtė; Senda Baccar	6; 1	6; 0
3	(Lithuania) (Tunisia)	Rūta Deduraitė / Edita Liachovičiūtė; Azza Abbou / Mariem Nissaf Bouchlaka	6; 2	6; 1

== Turkey vs. Moldova ==
Turkey
3
Belek, Antalya, Turkey
15 May 2001
Red clay (outdoors)

Moldova
0

			1	2	3
1	(Turkey) (Moldova)	Merve Asımgil; Ina Sireţeanu	6; 2	6^{5} 7^{7}	6; 4
2	(Turkey) (Moldova)	Duygu Akşit Oal; Iulia Rozgon	6; 0	6; 1
3	(Turkey) (Moldova)	Duygu Akşit Oal / Pemra Özgen; Iulia Rozgon / Ludmila Stăvilă	7; 5	6; 1

== Lithuania vs. Botswana ==
Lithuania
3
Belek, Antalya, Turkey
15 May 2001
Red clay (outdoors)

Botswana
0

			1	2	3
1	(Lithuania) (Botswana)	Rūta Deduraitė; Razalia Phethu	6; 3	6; 0
2	(Lithuania) (Botswana)	Eglė Petrauskaitė; Kelesitse Makgale	6; 1	6; 0
3	(Lithuania) (Botswana)	Rūta Deduraitė / Edita Liachovičiūtė; Kelesitse Makgale / Razalia Phethu	6; 2	6; 1

== Turkey vs. Tunisia ==
Turkey
3
Belek, Antalya, Turkey
16 May 2001
Red clay (outdoors)

Tunisia
0

			1	2	3
1	(Turkey) (Tunisia)	Merve Asımgil; Azza Abbou	6; 1	6; 1
2	(Turkey) (Tunisia)	Duygu Akşit Oal; Mariem Nissaf Bouchlaka	6; 2	6; 1
3	(Turkey) (Tunisia)	Duygu Akşit Oal / Pemra Özgen; Senda Baccar / Meriem Zitouni	6; 0	6; 1

== Moldova vs. Botswana ==
Moldova
2
Belek, Antalya, Turkey
16 May 2001
Red clay (outdoors)

Botswana
1

			1	2	3
1	(Moldova) (Botswana)	Ina Sireţeanu; Tapiwa Marobela	2; 6	3; 6
2	(Moldova) (Botswana)	Iulia Rozgon; Kago Phatshwane	6; 1	6; 2
3	(Moldova) (Botswana)	Iulia Rozgon / Ludmila Stăvilă; Kelesitse Makgale / Razalia Phethu	6; 0	4; 6	6; 2

== Turkey vs. Lithuania ==
Turkey
2
Belek, Antalya, Turkey
17 May 2001
Red clay (outdoors)

Lithuania
1

			1	2	3
1	(Turkey) (Lithuania)	Merve Asımgil; Ilona Jarkova	3; 6	2; 6
2	(Turkey) (Lithuania)	Duygu Akşit Oal; Edita Liachovičiūtė	6; 2	3; 6	9; 7
3	(Turkey) (Lithuania)	Duygu Akşit Oal / Merve Asımgil; Rūta Deduraitė / Edita Liachovičiūtė	6; 1	7^{9} 6^{7}

== Moldova vs. Tunisia ==
Moldova
3
Belek, Antalya, Turkey
17 May 2001
Red clay (outdoors)

Tunisia
0

			1	2	3
1	(Moldova) (Tunisia)	Ludmila Stăvilă; Azza Abbou	6; 1	6; 1
2	(Moldova) (Tunisia)	Iulia Rozgon; Senda Baccar	5; 7	6; 2	6; 1
3	(Moldova) (Tunisia)	Angela Ahtemenciuc / Ludmila Stăvilă; Azza Abbou / Meriem Zitouni	7^{7} 6^{4}	6; 0

== Lithuania vs. Moldova ==
Lithuania
3
Belek, Antalya, Turkey
18 May 2001
Red clay (outdoors)

Moldova
0

			1	2	3
1	(Lithuania) (Moldova)	Eglė Petrauskaitė; Ludmila Stăvilă	6; 2	6; 1
2	(Lithuania) (Moldova)	Ilona Jarkova; Iulia Rozgon	6; 0	4; 6	6; 2
3	(Lithuania) (Moldova)	Ilona Jarkova / Eglė Petrauskaitė; Angela Ahtemenciuc / Ludmila Stăvilă	6; 4	6; 2

== Tunisia vs. Botswana ==
Tunisia
2
Belek, Antalya, Turkey
18 May 2001
Red clay (outdoors)

Botswana
1

			1	2	3
1	(Tunisia) (Botswana)	Mariem Nissaf Bouchlaka; Tapiwa Marobela	1; 6	4; 6
2	(Tunisia) (Botswana)	Senda Baccar; Razalia Phethu	6; 0	6; 1
3	(Tunisia) (Botswana)	Senda Baccar / Mariem Nissaf Bouchlaka; Kelesitse Makgale / Tapiwa Marobela	7^{7} 6^{3}	6; 3

- Turkey placed first in this group and thus advanced to Group I for 2002, where they placed last in their pool of four, and was thus relegated back to Group II for 2003.

== See also ==
- Fed Cup structure
