= 2001 Fed Cup Europe/Africa Zone Group II – Pool A =

International tennis competition

Group A of the 2001 Fed Cup Europe/Africa Zone Group II was one of four pools in the Europe/Africa zone of the 2001 Fed Cup. Five teams competed in a round robin competition, with the top team advancing to Group I for 2002.

	(Georgia (country)) GEO	(Latvia) LAT	(Republic of Ireland) IRL	(Malta) MLT	RR; W–L	Set; W–L	Game; W–L	Standings
Georgia		3–0	3–0	3–0	3–0	18–2	117–65	1
Latvia	0–3		2–1	1–2	1–2	10–12	104–111	2
Ireland	0–3	1–2		2–1	1–2	6–12	80–90	3
Malta	0–3	2–1	1–2		1–2	6–14	76–111	4

== Georgia vs. Malta ==
Georgia
3
Belek, Antalya, Turkey
15 May 2001
Red clay (outdoors)

Malta
0

			1	2	3
1	(Georgia (country)) (Malta)	Salome Devidze; Carol Cassar-Torreggiani	6; 2	6; 1
2	(Georgia (country)) (Malta)	Margalita Chakhnashvili; Lisa Camenzuli	6; 3	6; 1
3	(Georgia (country)) (Malta)	Margalita Chakhnashvili / Salome Devidze; Lisa Camenzuli / Carol Cassar-Torreggiani	6; 2	6; 4

== Latvia vs. Ireland ==
Latvia
2
Belek, Antalya, Turkey
15 May 2001
Red clay (outdoors)

Ireland
1

			1	2	3
1	(Latvia) (Republic of Ireland)	Ilona Giberte; Yvonne Doyle	3; 6	4; 6
2	(Latvia) (Republic of Ireland)	Katrina Banderę; Kelly Liggan	6; 3	6; 4
3	(Latvia) (Republic of Ireland)	Katrina Banderę / Ilona Giberte; Yvonne Doyle / Karen Nugent	7; 3	6; 4

== Georgia vs. Latvia ==
Georgia
3
Belek, Antalya, Turkey
16 May 2001
Red clay (outdoors)

Latvia
0

			1	2	3
1	(Georgia (country)) (Latvia)	Salome Devidze; Ilona Giberte	6; 4	6; 4
2	(Georgia (country)) (Latvia)	Margalita Chakhnashvili; Katrina Banderę	5; 7	6; 3	6; 4
3	(Georgia (country)) (Latvia)	Margalita Chakhnashvili / Salome Devidze; Katrina Banderę / Ilona Giberte	6; 1	3; 6	6; 4

== Ireland vs. Malta ==
Ireland
2
Belek, Antalya, Turkey
16 May 2001
Red clay (outdoors)

Malta
1

			1	2	3
1	(Republic of Ireland) (Malta)	Yvonne Doyle; Carol Cassar-Torreggiani	6; 4	6; 1
2	(Republic of Ireland) (Malta)	Kelly Liggan; Lisa Camenzuli	6; 1	6; 2
3	(Republic of Ireland) (Malta)	Kelly Liggan / Karen Nugent; Lisa Camenzuli / Carol Cassar-Torreggiani	6^{5} 7^{7}	5; 7

== Georgia vs. Ireland ==
Georgia
3
Belek, Antalya, Turkey
17 May 2001
Red clay (outdoors)

Ireland
0

			1	2	3
1	(Georgia (country)) (Republic of Ireland)	Salome Devidze; Yvonne Doyle	6; 3	6; 3
2	(Georgia (country)) (Republic of Ireland)	Margalita Chakhnashvili; Kelly Liggan	6; 3	6; 1
3	(Georgia (country)) (Republic of Ireland)	Salome Devidze / Nino Esebua; Gina Niland / Karen Nugent	7; 5	6; 4

== Latvia vs. Malta ==
Latvia
1
Belek, Antalya, Turkey
17 May 2001
Red clay (outdoors)

Malta
2

			1	2	3
1	(Latvia) (Malta)	Ilona Giberte; Helen Asciak	7; 5	6; 3
2	(Latvia) (Malta)	Katrina Banderę; Lisa Camenzuli	6; 2	6^{4} 7^{7}	1; 6
3	(Latvia) (Malta)	Katrina Banderę / Ilona Giberte; Lisa Camenzuli / Carol Cassar-Torreggiani	5; 7	6; 4	4; 6

- Georgia placed first in this group and thus advanced to Group I for 2002, where they placed third in their pool of four.

== See also ==
- Fed Cup structure
