= 2001 Fed Cup Europe/Africa Zone Group II – Pool B =

International tennis competition

Group B of the 2001 Fed Cup Europe/Africa Zone Group II was one of four pools in the Europe/Africa zone of the 2001 Fed Cup. Five teams competed in a round robin competition, with the top team advancing to Group I for 2002.

	(Portugal) POR	(Finland) FIN	(Algeria) ALG	(Morocco) MAR	RR; W–L	Set; W–L	Game; W–L	Standings
Portugal		2–1	3–0	2–1	3–0	14–4	94–51	1
Finland	1–2		3–0	2–1	2–1	13–7	98–74	2
Algeria	0–3	0–3		2–1	1–2	5–14	56–101	3
Morocco	1–2	1–2	1–2		0–3	7–14	88–110	4

== Portugal vs. Finland ==
Portugal
2
Belek, Antalya, Turkey
15 May 2001
Red clay (outdoors)

Finland
1

			1	2	3
1	(Portugal) (Finland)	Frederica Piedade; Carina Björnström	6; 0	6; 2
2	(Portugal) (Finland)	Ana Catarina Nogueira; Emma Laine	2; 6	4; 6
3	(Portugal) (Finland)	Angela Cardoso / Ana Catarina Nogueira; Essi Laine / Kirsi Lampinen	6; 3	6; 2

== Algeria vs. Morocco ==
Algeria
2
Belek, Antalya, Turkey
15 May 2001
Red clay (outdoors)

Morocco
1

			1	2	3
1	(Algeria) (Morocco)	Sana Ben Salah; Habiba Ifrakh	6; 3	6^{5} 7^{7}	3; 6
2	(Algeria) (Morocco)	Sihem Ben Youcef; Meryem El Haddad	6; 4	6; 4
3	(Algeria) (Morocco)	Sihem Ben Youcef / Ouarda Bouchabou; Meryem El Haddad / Habiba Ifrakh	6; 3	6; 2

== Portugal vs. Algeria ==
Portugal
3
Belek, Antalya, Turkey
16 May 2001
Red clay (outdoors)

Algeria
0

			1	2	3
1	(Portugal) (Algeria)	Frederica Piedade; Sana Ben Salah	6; 3	6; 0
2	(Portugal) (Algeria)	Ana Catarina Nogueira; Sihem Ben Youcef	6; 1	6; 1
3	(Portugal) (Algeria)	Angela Cardoso / Ana Catarina Nogueira; Karima Ait Ali Yahia / Sana Ben Salah	6; 3	6; 1

== Finland vs. Morocco ==
Finland
2
Belek, Antalya, Turkey
16 May 2001
Red clay (outdoors)

Morocco
1

			1	2	3
1	(Finland) (Morocco)	Essi Laine; Habiba Ifrakh	6; 3	1; 6	2; 6
2	(Finland) (Morocco)	Emma Laine; Meryem El Haddad	6; 2	6; 3
3	(Finland) (Morocco)	Emma Laine / Essi Laine; Meryem El Haddad / Habiba Ifrakh	6; 1	6^{5} 7^{7}	10; 8

== Portugal vs. Morocco ==
Portugal
2
Belek, Antalya, Turkey
17 May 2001
Red clay (outdoors)

Morocco
1

			1	2	3
1	(Portugal) (Morocco)	Angela Cardoso; Habiba Ifrakh	6; 1	6; 3
2	(Portugal) (Morocco)	Ana Catarina Nogueira; Meryem El Haddad	2; 6	2; 6
3	(Portugal) (Morocco)	Angela Cardoso / Frederica Piedade; Meryem El Haddad / Habiba Ifrakh	6; 4	6; 4

== Finland vs. Algeria ==
Finland
3
Belek, Antalya, Turkey
17 May 2001
Red clay (outdoors)

Algeria
0

			1	2	3
1	(Finland) (Algeria)	Essi Laine; Sana Ben Salah	6; 1	6; 0
2	(Finland) (Algeria)	Emma Laine; Sihem Ben Youcef	6; 1	6; 3
3	(Finland) (Algeria)	Carina Björnström / Emma Laine; Karima Ait Ali Yahia / Sana Ben Salah	6; 2	6; 1

- Portugal placed first in this group and thus advanced to Group I for 2002, where they placed last in their pool of four and thus were relegated back to Group II for 2003.

== See also ==
- Fed Cup structure
