= 2005 Fed Cup Europe/Africa Zone Group III – Pool B =

International tennis competition

Group B of the 2005 Fed Cup Europe/Africa Zone Group III was one of four pools in the Europe/Africa Zone Group III of the 2005 Fed Cup. Three teams competed in a round robin competition, with the top team and the bottom two teams proceeding to their respective sections of the play-offs: the top team will play for advancement to Group II.

		(Algeria) ALG	(Botswana) BOT	(Iceland) ISL	RR; W–L	Set; W–L	Game; W–L	Standings
72	Algeria		3–0	3–0	2–0	12–0	72–16	1
81	Botswana	0–3		3–0	1–1	6–6	46–50	2
	Iceland	0–3	0–3		0–2	0–12	20–72	3

== Botswana vs. Iceland ==
Botswana
3
Club Ali Bey, Manavgat, Antalya, Turkey
27 April 2005
Red clay (outdoors)

Iceland
0

			1	2	3
1	(Botswana) (Iceland)	Lesedi Ramocha; Rebekka Pétursdóttir	6; 1	6; 4
2	(Botswana) (Iceland)	Laone Botshoma; Sigurlaug Sigurðardóttir	6; 2	6; 2
3	(Botswana) (Iceland)	Laone Botshoma / Lesedi Ramocha; Rebekka Pétursdóttir / Sigurlaug Sigurðardóttir	6; 1	6; 4

== Algeria vs. Botswana ==
Algeria
3
Club Ali Bey, Manavgat, Antalya, Turkey
28 April 2005
Red clay (outdoors)

Botswana
0

			1	2	3
1	(Algeria) (Botswana)	Sara Meghoufel; Puleng Tlhophane	6; 1	6; 1
2	(Algeria) (Botswana)	Samia Medjahdi; Laone Botshoma	6; 1	6; 3
3	(Algeria) (Botswana)	Amira Benaissa / Sara Meghoufel; Laone Botshoma / Puleng Tlhophane	6; 2	6; 2

== Algeria vs. Iceland ==
Algeria
3
Club Ali Bey, Manavgat, Antalya, Turkey
29 April 2005
Red clay (outdoors)

Iceland
0

			1	2	3
1	(Algeria) (Iceland)	Assia Halo; Sandra Kristjánsdóttir	6; 0	6; 0
2	(Algeria) (Iceland)	Samia Medjahdi; Sigurlaug Sigurðardóttir	6; 2	6; 1
3	(Algeria) (Iceland)	Amira Benaissa / Sara Meghoufel; Sandra Kristjánsdóttir / Sigurlaug Sigurðardóttir	6; 2	6; 1

== See also ==
- Fed Cup structure
