= 2005 Fed Cup Europe/Africa Zone Group III – Pool A =

Group A of the 2005 Fed Cup Europe/Africa Zone Group III was one of four pools in the Europe/Africa Zone Group III of the 2005 Fed Cup. Three teams competed in a round robin competition, with the top team and the bottom two teams proceeding to their respective sections of the play-offs: the top team will play for advancement to Group II.

| | | (Turkey) TUR | (Egypt) EGY | (Malta) MLT | RR; W–L | Set; W–L | Game; W–L | Standings |
| 68 | Turkey | | 2–1 | 3–0 | 2–0 | 10–3 | 65–36 | 1 |
| 70 | Egypt | 1–2 | | 3–0 | 1–1 | 6–4 | 52–42 | 2 |
| 76 | Malta | 0–3 | 0–3 | | 0–2 | 1–10 | 29–68 | 3 |

== Egypt vs. Malta ==
Egypt
3
Club Ali Bey, Manavgat, Antalya, Turkey
27 April 2005
Red clay (outdoors)

Malta
0

| | | | 1 | 2 | 3 |
|---|---|---|---|---|---|---|
| 1 | (Egypt) (Malta) | Aliaa Fakhry; Lisa Camenzuli | 5; 2 | | | retired |
| 2 | (Egypt) (Malta) | Nihal Tarek-Saleh; Stephanie Pace | 6; 0 | 6; 1 |
| 3 | (Egypt) (Malta) | Miray Eshak / Aliaa Fakhry; Stephanie Pace / Stephanie Sullivan | 7^{7} 6^{2} | 7; 5 |

== Turkey vs. Malta ==
Turkey
3
Club Ali Bey, Manavgat, Antalya, Turkey
28 April 2005
Red clay (outdoors)

Malta
0

| | | | 1 | 2 | 3 |
|---|---|---|---|---|---|
| 1 | (Turkey) (Malta) | Pemra Özgen; Stephanie Pace | 6; 0 | 6; 1 |
| 2 | (Turkey) (Malta) | İpek Şenoğlu; Stephanie Sullivan | 6; 4 | 1; 6 | 6; 2 |
| 3 | (Turkey) (Malta) | Çağla Büyükakçay / Pemra Özgen; Stephanie Pace / Stephanie Sullivan | 6; 2 | 6; 0 |

== Turkey vs. Egypt ==
Turkey
3
Club Ali Bey, Manavgat, Antalya, Turkey
29 April 2005
Red clay (outdoors)

Egypt
0

| | | | 1 | 2 | 3 |
|---|---|---|---|---|---|
| 1 | (Turkey) (Egypt) | Pemra Özgen; Aliaa Fakhry | 6; 1 | 6; 2 |
| 2 | (Turkey) (Egypt) | İpek Şenoğlu; Nihal Tarek-Saleh | 0; 6 | 4; 6 |
| 3 | (Turkey) (Egypt) | Pemra Özgen / İpek Şenoğlu; Aliaa Fakhry / Nihal Tarek-Saleh | 6; 3 | 6; 3 |

== See also ==
- Fed Cup structure
