= Greek International Championships =

Defunct tennis tournament
- Tour: ILTF Circuit (1931-1971)
- Founded: 1931; 94 years ago
- Abolished: 1971; 54 years ago
- Location: Athens
- Venue: Various

Current champions
- Men's singles: (Greece) Nicky Kalogeropoulos

The Greek International Championships, sometimes known as the Eastern Mediterranean Championships, was a tennis tournament held between 1931 and 1971.

== History ==
Th event began in the inter-war period. The event was the Greek International Championships, but sometimes called the Eastern Mediterranean Championships. It was held in Athens typically in early September. Winners of the event included Gottfried von Cramm (who won his first title in 1931 and his last in 1949), Jiro Sato, Giorgio de Stefani, Kho Sin-Kie, Kurt Nielsen, Sven Davidson and Ulf Schmidt. The event was held in the early open era, but was not part of the Grand Prix circuit, so it became defunct in the early 1970s, though there was an ATP event in Athens that began in 1986.

== Finals ==
=== Men's singles ===
Year	Champion	Runner-up	Score
1931	(West Germany) Gottfried von Cramm	(France) Benny Berthet	2-6, 2–6, 6–0, 6–2, 6–3
1932	(Japan) Jiro Sato	(France) Pierre Grandguillot	6-2, 6–3, 8–6
1933	(France) Roland Journu	(Czechoslovakia) Jiri Krasny	6-1, 6–4, 6–3
1934	(Italy) Giorgio de Stefani	(Socialist Federal Republic of Yugoslavia) Josip Palada	6-2, 6–1, 5–7, 6–2
1935	(France) Roland Journu	(France) Antoine Gentien	6-1, 6–8, 6–0, 8–6
1936	(Socialist Federal Republic of Yugoslavia) Franjo Punčec	(France) Roland Journu	7-5, 6–4, 6–1
1937	(China) Kho Sin-Kie	(Italy) Giorgio de Stefani	9-7, 3–6, 10–8, 7–5
1938	(Italy) Giorgio de Stefani	(Switzerland) Max Ellmer	6-0, 6–2, 6–3
1939	(Nazi Germany) Gottfried von Cramm	(United States) Don McNeill	7-5, 6–1, 6–2
1940-46	No competition		
1948	(Greece) Lazaros Stalios	(United Kingdom) Don Butler	5-7, 6–4, 6–3, 6–4
1949	(West Germany) Gottfried von Cramm	(Australia) Jack Harper	6-3, 6–4, 6–4
1950	(United States) Fred Kovaleski	(Italy) Giovanni Cucelli	8-6, 6–4, 9–7
1951	(Philippines) Felicisimo Ampon	(France) Robert Abdesselam	6-4, 7–5, 7–5
1952	(France) Paul Rémy	(Poland) Władysław Skonecki	1-6, 4–6, 6–1, 6–3, 6–2
1953	(France) Paul Rémy	(Italy) Umberto Bergamo	6-1, 6–1, 6–3
1954	(Denmark) Kurt Nielsen	(France) Paul Rémy	5-7, 8–6, 6–2, 9–7
1955	(Sweden) Sven Davidson	(Australia) Mervyn Rose	6-2, 6–3, 6–3
1956	(Sweden) Sven Davidson	(United States) Budge Patty	w/o
1957	(Denmark) Kurt Nielsen	(Sweden) Sven Davidson	9-11, 6–2, 6–2, 6–3
1958	(Italy) Orlando Sirola	(Sweden) Sven Davidson	4-6, 6–4, 6–1, 6–8, 8–6
1959	(Sweden) Ulf Schmidt	(Australia) Bob Howe	5 sets
1969	(Japan) Koji Watanabe	(Australia) Geoff Masters	6-3, 4–6, 6–2, 6–1
1971	(Greece) Nicky Kalogeropoulos	(France) Patrice Dominguez	6-3, 7–5, 6–2

== See also ==
- Category:National and multi-national tennis tournaments
