= 2005 Fed Cup Europe/Africa Zone Group III – Pool D =

Group D of the 2005 Fed Cup Europe/Africa Zone Group III was one of four pools in the Europe/Africa Zone Group III of the 2005 Fed Cup. Three teams competed in a round robin competition, with the top team and the bottom two teams proceeding to their respective sections of the play-offs: the top team will play for advancement to Group II.

		(Portugal) POR	(Kenya) KEN	(Moldova) MDA	RR; W–L	Set; W–L	Game; W–L	Standings
65	Portugal		3–0	2–1	2–0	10–3	73–28	1
85	Kenya	0–3		0–3	0–2	0–12	13–73	3
	Moldova	1–2	3–0		1–1	9–4	62–47	2

== Kenya vs. Moldova ==
Kenya
0
Club Ali Bey, Manavgat, Antalya, Turkey
27 April 2005
Red clay (outdoors)

Moldova
3

			1	2	3
1	(Kenya) (Moldova)	Wanjika Ngaruiya; Svetlana Komleva	0; 6	1; 6
2	(Kenya) (Moldova)	Evelyn Otula; Ina Sireţeanu	0; 6	2; 6
3	(Kenya) (Moldova)	Caroline Oduor / Tamara Orwa; Olga Ćosić / Maria Melihova	1; 6	6^{4} 7^{7}

== Portugal vs. Moldova ==
Portugal
2
Club Ali Bey, Manavgat, Antalya, Turkey
28 April 2005
Red clay (outdoors)

Moldova
1

			1	2	3
1	(Portugal) (Moldova)	Ana Catarina Nogueira; Svetlana Komleva	4; 6	6; 3	6; 1
2	(Portugal) (Moldova)	Neuza Silva; Ina Sireţeanu	6; 1	6; 1
3	(Portugal) (Moldova)	Magali de Lattre / Carlota Plantier Santos; Olga Ćosić / Svetlana Komleva	3; 6	6^{5} 7^{7}

== Portugal vs. Kenya ==
Portugal
3
Club Ali Bey, Manavgat, Antalya, Turkey
29 April 2005
Red clay (outdoors)

Kenya
0

			1	2	3
1	(Portugal) (Kenya)	Carlota Plantier Santos; Wanjika Ngaruiya	6; 0	6; 2
2	(Portugal) (Kenya)	Magali de Lattre; Evelyn Otula	6; 0	6; 1
3	(Portugal) (Kenya)	Ana Catarina Nogueira / Neuza Silva; Caroline Oduor / Tamara Orwa	6; 0	6; 0

== See also ==
- Fed Cup structure
