= Tinatin Kavlashvili =

Georgian tennis player

- Country (sports): Georgia
- Born: 9 February 1987 (age 38)
- Plays: Right (two-handed backhand)
- Prize money: $17,141

Singles
- Career record: 89–46
- Career titles: 2 ITF
- Highest ranking: No. 479 (19 May 2008)

Doubles
- Career record: 17–21
- Career titles: 1 ITF
- Highest ranking: No. 764 (9 May 2016)

Tinatin Kavlashvili (born 9 February 1987) is a Georgian former professional tennis player. She had a short comeback in May 2022, at the $25k tournament in Tbilisi, Georgia.

Kavlashvili, a right-handed player, reached a career-high ranking of 479 in the world and won two singles titles and one doubles title on the ITF Women's Circuit. She appeared in twelve Fed Cup ties for Georgia between 2003 and 2005, with an overall win-loss record of 8–9.

== ITF Circuit finals ==
Legend
$50,000 tournaments
$25,000 tournaments
$10,000 tournaments

=== Singles: 3 (2 titles, 1 runner-up) ===
Result	Date	Tournament	Surface	Opponent	Score
Win	6 June 2004	ITF Istanbul, Turkey	Hard	(Belarus) Iryna Brémond	6–2, 1–6, 6–3
Win	9 September 2007	ITF Baku, Azerbaijan	Clay	(Ukraine) Lesia Tsurenko	6–3, 6–4
Loss	16 September 2007	ITF Tbilisi, Georgia	Clay	(Georgia (country)) Tatia Mikadze	6–1, 4–6, 5–7

=== Doubles: 2 (1 title, 1 runner-up) ===
Result	Date	Tournament	Surface	Partner	Opponents	Score
Loss	16 September 2007	ITF Tbilisi, Georgia	Clay	(Georgia (country)) Sofia Shapatava	(Russia) Avgusta Tsybysheva (Georgia (country)) Manana Shapakidze	1–6, 6–1, [8–10]
Win	21 June 2015	ITF Telavi, Georgia	Hard	(Georgia (country)) Mariam Bolkvadze	(Italy) Marianna Natali (Japan) Seira Shimizu	6–4, 7–5
