= Aurelija Misevičiūtė =

Lithuanian tennis player (born 1986)

- Country (sports): Lithuania
- Born: 24 April 1986 (age 40) Klaipėda, Lithuanian SSR, Soviet Union (now Lithuania)
- Turned pro: 2001
- Retired: 2011
- Plays: Right-handed (double-handed backhand)
- College: Arkansas
- Prize money: $10,712

Singles
- Career record: 27-27
- Career titles: 1 ITF
- Highest ranking: 284 (29 September 2003)

Doubles
- Career record: 15-19
- Career titles: 0
- Highest ranking: 337 (09 February 2004)

Team competitions
- Fed Cup: 10–11

Aurelija Misevičiūtė (born 24 April 1986 in Klaipėda) is a Lithuanian former tennis player.

== Career ==
In her career, she won one singles titles on the ITF Women's Circuit. On 29 September 2003, she reached her best singles ranking of world number 284. On 9 February 2004, she peaked at number 337 in the doubles rankings.

Misevičiūtė played collegiate tennis at the University of Arkansas.

Misevičiūtė retired from professional tennis 2011.

== ITF finals ==
=== Singles: 2 (1–1) ===
| Legend $100,000 tournaments $75,000 tournaments $50,000 tournaments $25,000 tournaments $10,000 tournaments | Finals by surface Hard (1–0) Clay (0–1) Grass (0–0) Carpet (0–0) |

| Outcome | Date | Tournament | Surface | Opponent | Score |
|---|---|---|---|---|---|
| Runner-up | 13 October 2002 | Ain Sukhna, Egypt | Clay | (Serbia) Ana Jovanović | 4–6, 1–6 |
| Winner | 9 February 2003 | Doha, Qatar | Hard | (Russia) Galina Fokina | 6–4, 4–6, 6–4 |

=== Doubles: 2 (0–2) ===
| Legend $100,000 tournaments $75,000 tournaments $50,000 tournaments $25,000 tournaments $10,000 tournaments | Finals by surface Hard (0–1) Clay (0–1) Grass (0–0) Carpet (0–0) |

| Outcome | Date | Tournament | Surface | Partner | Opponents | Score |
|---|---|---|---|---|---|---|
| Runner-up | 15 March 2003 | Kaunas, Lithuania | Hard (i) | (Lithuania) Lina Stančiūtė | (Belarus) Darya Kustova (Ukraine) Elena Tatarkova | 1–6, 6–7^{(8–10)} |
| Runner-up | 16 October 2004 | Castel Gandolfo, Italy | Clay | (Germany) Nina Henkel | (Italy) Raffaella Bindi (Italy) Francesca Frappi | 4–6, 6–3, 0–6 |
