= Athens Lawn Tennis Club =

Multi-sports club in Athens, Greece

Coordinates: 37°58′12″N 23°44′4″E

The Athens Lawn Tennis Club (Greek: Όμιλος Αντισφαίρισης Αθηνών) is a multi-sports club that is located in Athens, Greece. The club currently has departments in bridge, gymnastics, squash, and in men's, women's and youth tennis. The club hosted the tennis events of the 1896 Summer Olympics, as well as the tennis events of the 1906 Intercalated Games. In more modern times, the men's Athens Open (1986–1994) and the women's Athens Trophy (1986–1990) professional tournaments were held there.

== History ==
The Athens Lawn Tennis multi-sports club was founded in Athens, in 1895. The club was named "Athens Lawn Tennis Club" because its main department was the tennis department, and because it competed in tennis on grass. Over the years, the club has also featured departments in: athletics, basketball, bridge, dance, fencing, football, gymnastics, judo, squash, swimming, tennis, and volleyball.

At the 1896 Athens Summer Olympics, the tennis matches took place at the club's facilities. During that Olympics, the club's players Dionysios Kasdaglis and Dimitrios Petrokokkinos won silver medals. The club also hosted the 1906 Intercalated Games, where its players Ioannis Ballis, Xenophon Kasdaglis, Georgios Simiriotis, Esmée Simirioti, Sofia Marinou, Euphrosine Paspati, and Aspasia Matsa won a total of 6 medals.

== Facilities ==
The club's sports facilities are located in Athens, nearby to the Zappeion, the Temple of Zeus, and the facilities of the Greek sports club Ethnikos G.S. Athens. The club's sports facilities include courts for both squash and tennis, along with an indoor gym that includes locker rooms, and a sauna facility. The club's sports facilities also include a canteen, a restaurant, and a tennis museum.

== Former tournaments ==
Former notable tournaments held at this club include the following below.

- Greek International Championships (1931, 1948, 1958, 1970)
- Eastern Mediterranean Championships (1932–1937, 1949–1957, 1959)
- Athens International (1959, 1968–1969, 1971–1973)

== Sources ==
ET-Sports, issue 32 (24-3-2008), page 9. (in Greek)
