= Lesotho Billie Jean King Cup team =

The Lesotho Fed Cup team represents Lesotho in Fed Cup tennis competition and are governed by the Lesotho Lawn Tennis Association. They have not competed since 2001.

== History ==
Lesotho competed in its first Fed Cup in 2000. Their best result was finishing fourth in their Group II pool in 2001.

== See also ==
- Billie Jean King Cup
- Lesotho Davis Cup team
