= Karoline Borgersen =

Norwegian tennis player

- Country (sports): Norway
- Born: 1 July 1976 (age 49)
- Height: 1.73 m (5 ft 8 in)
- Plays: Right-handed
- Prize money: $14,221

Singles
- Career record: 52–38
- Career titles: 0
- Highest ranking: No. 389 (12 June 2006)

Doubles
- Career record: 33–20
- Career titles: 3 ITF
- Highest ranking: No. 408 (19 June 2006)

Team competitions
- Fed Cup: 21–18

Karoline Borgersen (born 1 July 1976) is a Norwegian former professional tennis player.

== Biography ==
A right-handed player from Oslo, Borgersen debuted for the Norway Fed Cup team in 1994, but didn't tour professionally until 2004, having spent many of the previous years playing college tennis in California. She started at Pepperdine, then transferred to UC Berkeley, where she was a doubles All-American in 1999-2000.

Borgersen reached a best singles ranking of 389 on the professional circuit and won three ITF titles in doubles. A former Norwegian number one, she twice featured in the singles qualifying draw for the Nordic Light Open, a WTA Tour tournament held in Stockholm.

In 2006, she made her last Fed Cup appearance, having featured in a total of 26 ties, for 12 singles and nine doubles wins.

== ITF finals ==
=== Singles (0–1) ===
Outcome	No.	Date	Tournament	Surface	Opponent	Score
Runner-up	1.	28 November 2004	ITF Pretoria, South Africa	Hard	(South Africa) Chanelle Scheepers	1–6, 3–6

=== Doubles (3–4) ===
Outcome	No.	Date	Tournament	Surface	Partner	Opponents	Score
Runner-up	1.	27 June 2004	ITF Tlemcen, Algeria	Clay	(Austria) Anna-Maria Miller	(New Zealand) Shelley Stephens (France) Joanne Akl	1–6, 0–6
Winner	1.	22 November 2004	ITF Pretoria, South Africa	Hard	(Netherlands) Leonie Mekel	(Switzerland) Karin Schlapbach (Switzerland) Vanessa Wellauer	6–2, 6–4
Runner-up	2.	3 December 2004	ITF Pretoria, South Africa	Hard	(Netherlands) Leonie Mekel	(South Africa) Chanelle Scheepers (United Kingdom) Melissa Berry	2–6, 6–3, 5–7
Runner-up	3.	25 June 2005	ITF Oslo, Norway	Clay	(Sweden) Kristina Andlovic	(Sweden) Nadja Roma (Sweden) Johanna Larsson	4–6, 4–6
Winner	2.	23 May 2006	ITF Balș, Romania	Clay	(Sweden) Mari Andersson	(Romania) Raluca Ciulei (Romania) Lenore Lazaroiu	6–0, 6–1
Winner	3.	4 June 2006	ITF Rousse, Bulgaria	Clay	(Bulgaria) Dia Evtimova	(Bulgaria) Biljana Pawlowa-Dimitrova (Bulgaria) Nadejda Vassileva	6–0, 6–0
Runner-up	4.	29 July 2006	ITF Gausdal, Norway	Hard	(Sweden) Michaela Johansson	(Sweden) Mari Andersson (Sweden) Nadja Roma	4–6, 0–6
