= Bosnia and Herzegovina Billie Jean King Cup team =

Bosnian and Herzegovinian women's tennis team

Bosnia and Herzegovina
- Captain: Vojin Šukalo
- ITF ranking: 64 ▼8 (24 July 2017)
- First year: 1997
- Years played: 21
- Ties played (W–L): 83 (43–40)
- Best finish: Zonal Group I RR
- Most total wins: Mervana Jugić-Salkić (33–18)
- Most singles wins: Mervana Jugić-Salkić (25–10)
- Most doubles wins: Nadina Šećerbegović (8-1); Mervana Jugić-Salkić (8–8)
- Best doubles team: Selma Babić / Nadina Šećerbegović (6-1)
- Most ties played: Mervana Jugić-Salkić (35)
- Most years played: Mervana Jugić-Salkić; Anita Husarić(9)

The Bosnia and Herzegovina Billie Jean King Cup team represents Bosnia and Herzegovina in Billie Jean King Cup tennis competition and are governed by the Tennis Association of Bosnia and Herzegovina. They currently compete in the Europe/Africa Zone of Group I.

== History ==
Bosnia and Herzegovina competed in its first Billie Jean King Cup in 1997. Their best result was reaching Group I in 2002. Prior to 1992, Bosnian players represented Yugoslavia.

== Current team (2017) ==
- Dea Herdželaš
- Jelena Simić
- Anita Husarić
- Nefisa Berberović

== Results and schedule ==
=== 1997–1999 ===
Year	Competition	Date	Surface	Location	Opponent	Score	Result
1997	Europe/Africa Zone Group II Group C	5 May	Clay	Manavgat, Turkey	Norway	3 – 0	Won
1997	Europe/Africa Zone Group II Group C	6 May	Clay	Manavgat, Turkey	Turkey	1 – 2	Lost
1997	Europe/Africa Zone Group II Group C	7 May	Clay	Manavgat, Turkey	Portugal	0 – 3	Lost
1997	Europe/Africa Zone Group II Group C	8 May	Clay	Manavgat, Turkey	Ethiopia	3 – 0	Won
1997	Europe/Africa Zone Group II Group C	9 May	Clay	Manavgat, Turkey	San Marino	3 – 0	Won
1998	Europe/Africa Zone Group II Group D	5 May	Clay	Manavgat, Turkey	Ireland	2 – 1	Won
1998	Europe/Africa Zone Group II Group D	6 May	Clay	Manavgat, Turkey	Georgia	1 – 2	Lost
1998	Europe/Africa Zone Group II Group D	7 May	Clay	Manavgat, Turkey	Estonia	1 – 2	Lost
1998	Europe/Africa Zone Group II Group D	8 May	Clay	Manavgat, Turkey	Iceland	3 – 0	Won
1998	Europe/Africa Zone Group II Group D	9 May	Clay	Manavgat, Turkey	Moldova	1 – 2	Lost
1999	Europe/Africa Zone Group II Group A	26 April	Clay	Murcia, Spain	Botswana	3 – 0	Won
1999	Europe/Africa Zone Group II Group A	27 April	Clay	Murcia, Spain	Egypt	3 – 0	Won
1999	Europe/Africa Zone Group II Group A	28 April	Clay	Murcia, Spain	Madagascar	3 – 0	Won
1999	Europe/Africa Zone Group II Group A	30 April	Clay	Murcia, Spain	Hungary	0 – 3	Lost

=== 2000–2009 ===
Year	Competition	Date	Surface	Location	Opponent	Score	Result
2000	Europe/Africa Zone Group II Group B	28 March	Clay	Estoril, Portugal	Iceland	3 – 0	Won
2000	Europe/Africa Zone Group II Group B	29 March	Clay	Estoril, Portugal	Tunisia	3 – 0	Won
2000	Europe/Africa Zone Group II Group B	30 March	Clay	Estoril, Portugal	Botswana	3 – 0	Won
2000	Europe/Africa Zone Group II Group B	31 March	Clay	Estoril, Portugal	Denmark	0 – 3	Lost
2000	Europe/Africa Zone Group II Group B	1 April	Clay	Estoril, Portugal	Liechtenstein	1 – 0	Won
2001	Europe/Africa Zone Group II Group C	14 May	Clay	Antalya, Turkey	Egypt	3 – 0	Won
2001	Europe/Africa Zone Group II Group C	15 May	Clay	Antalya, Turkey	Lesotho	3 – 0	Won
2001	Europe/Africa Zone Group II Group C	16 May	Clay	Antalya, Turkey	Kenya	3 – 0	Won
2001	Europe/Africa Zone Group II Group C	17 May	Clay	Antalya, Turkey	Armenia	3 – 0	Promoted
2002	Europe/Africa Zone Group I Group B	24 April	Clay	Antalya, Turkey	Netherlands	0 – 3	Lost
2002	Europe/Africa Zone Group I Group B	25 April	Clay	Antalya, Turkey	Israel	0 – 3	Lost
2002	Europe/Africa Zone Group I Group B	26 April	Clay	Antalya, Turkey	Romania	0 – 3	Relegated
2003	Europe/Africa Zone Group II Group C	28 April	Clay	Estoril, Portugal	Botswana	3 – 0	Won
2003	Europe/Africa Zone Group II Group C	30 April	Clay	Estoril, Portugal	Finland	0 – 3	Lost
2003	Europe/Africa Zone Group II Group C	1 May	Clay	Estoril, Portugal	Egypt	1 – 2	Relegated
2004	Europe/Africa Zone Group III Group B	27 April	Hard	Marsa, Malta	Algeria	1 – 2	Lost
2004	Europe/Africa Zone Group III Group B	28 April	Hard	Marsa, Malta	Norway	1 – 2	Lost
2004	Europe/Africa Zone Group III Group B	29 April	Hard	Marsa, Malta	Namibia	2 – 1	Won
2004	Europe/Africa Zone Group III first round	30 April	Hard	Marsa, Malta	Kenya	3 – 0	Won
2005	Europe/Africa Zone Group III Group C	28 April	Clay	Manavgat, Turkey	Cyprus	3 – 0	Won
2005	Europe/Africa Zone Group III Group C	29 April	Clay	Manavgat, Turkey	Namibia	3 – 0	Won
2005	Europe/Africa Zone Group III first round	30 April	Clay	Manavgat, Turkey	Portugal	1 – 2	Lost
2006	Europe/Africa Zone Group III Group B	26 April	Clay	Manavgat, Turkey	Liechtenstein	2 – 0	Won
2006	Europe/Africa Zone Group III Group B	26 April	Clay	Manavgat, Turkey	Azerbaijan	2 – 0	Won
2006	Europe/Africa Zone Group III Group B	27 April	Clay	Manavgat, Turkey	Botswana	3 – 0	Won
2006	Europe/Africa Zone Group III Group B	28 April	Clay	Manavgat, Turkey	Namibia	3 – 0	Won
2006	Europe/Africa Zone Group III Group B	29 April	Clay	Manavgat, Turkey	Egypt	2 – 0	Promoted
2007	Europe/Africa Zone Group II Group B	18 April	Hard	Vacoas-Phoenix, Mauritius	Norway	3 – 0	Won
2007	Europe/Africa Zone Group II Group B	18 April	Hard	Vacoas-Phoenix, Mauritius	Portugal	0 – 2	Lost
2007	Europe/Africa Zone Group II Group B	19 April	Hard	Vacoas-Phoenix, Mauritius	Georgia	0 – 2	Lost
2007	Europe/Africa Zone Group II Relegation play-offs	20 April	Hard	Vacoas-Phoenix, Mauritius	Finland	2 – 0	Won
2008	Europe/Africa Zone Group II Group A	30 January	Hard	Tallinn, Estonia	Turkey	3 – 0	Won
2008	Europe/Africa Zone Group II Group A	1 February	Hard	Tallinn, Estonia	South Africa	3 – 0	Won
2008	Europe/Africa Zone Group II Promotion play-offs	2 February	Hard	Tallinn, Estonia	Lithuania	2 – 0	Promoted
2009	Europe/Africa Zone Group I Group B	4 February	Hard	Tallinn, Estonia	Sweden	0 – 3	Lost
2009	Europe/Africa Zone Group I Group B	5 February	Hard	Tallinn, Estonia	Romania	0 – 3	Lost
2009	Europe/Africa Zone Group I Group B	6 February	Hard	Tallinn, Estonia	Poland	1 – 2	Lost
2009	Europe/Africa Zone Group I Relegation play-offs	7 February	Hard	Tallinn, Estonia	Bulgaria	2 – 1	Won

=== 2010- ===
Year	Competition	Date	Surface	Location	Opponent	Score	Result
2010	Europe/Africa Zone Group I Group D	3 February	Hard	Lisbon, Portugal	Great Britain	0 – 3	Lost
2010	Europe/Africa Zone Group I Group D	4 February	Hard	Lisbon, Portugal	Belarus	0 – 3	Lost
2010	Europe/Africa Zone Group I Group D	5 February	Hard	Lisbon, Portugal	Austria	0 – 3	Lost
2010	Europe/Africa Zone Group I Relegation play-offs	6 February	Hard	Lisbon, Portugal	Latvia	0 – 3	Relegated
2011	Europe/Africa Zone Group II Group B	4 May	Clay	Cairo, Egypt	Turkey	3 – 0	Won
2011	Europe/Africa Zone Group II Group B	5 May	Clay	Cairo, Egypt	Georgia	2 – 1	Won
2011	Europe/Africa Zone Group II Group B	6 May	Clay	Cairo, Egypt	Armenia	3 – 0	Won
2011	Europe/Africa Zone Group II Promotion play-offs	7 May	Clay	Cairo, Egypt	Finland	2 – 1	Promoted
2012	Europe/Africa Zone Group I Group B	1 February	Hard	Eilat, Israel	Sweden	0 – 3	Lost
2012	Europe/Africa Zone Group I Group B	2 February	Hard	Eilat, Israel	Greece	3 – 0	Won
2012	Europe/Africa Zone Group I Group B	3 February	Hard	Eilat, Israel	Hungary	1 – 2	Lost
2012	Europe/Africa Zone Group I first round	4 February	Hard	Eilat, Israel	Croatia	0 – 2	Lost
2013	Europe/Africa Zone Group I Group B	7 February	Hard	Eilat, Israel	Great Britain	0 – 3	Lost
2013	Europe/Africa Zone Group I Group B	8 February	Hard	Eilat, Israel	Hungary	0 – 3	Lost
2013	Europe/Africa Zone Group I Group B	9 February	Hard	Eilat, Israel	Portugal	1 – 2	Lost
2013	Europe/Africa Zone Group I Relegation play-offs	10 February	Hard	Eilat, Israel	Luxembourg	0 – 2	Relegated
2014	Europe/Africa Zone Group II Group B	16 April	Hard	Šiauliai, Lithuania	South Africa	2 – 1	Won
2014	Europe/Africa Zone Group II Group B	17 April	Hard	Šiauliai, Lithuania	Egypt	2 – 1	Won
2014	Europe/Africa Zone Group II Group B	18 April	Hard	Šiauliai, Lithuania	Georgia	0 – 3	Lost
2014	Europe/Africa Zone Group II Promotion play-offs	19 April	Hard	Šiauliai, Lithuania	Liechtenstein	0 – 2	Lost
2015	Europe/Africa Zone Group II Group A	4 February	Hard	Tallinn, Estonia	Estonia	0 – 3	Lost
2015	Europe/Africa Zone Group II Group A	5 February	Hard	Tallinn, Estonia	Egypt	1 – 2	Lost
2015	Europe/Africa Zone Group II Group A	6 February	Hard	Tallinn, Estonia	South Africa	1 – 2	Lost
2015	Europe/Africa Zone Group II Relegation play-offs	7 February	Hard	Tallinn, Estonia	Ireland	2 – 1	Won
2016	Europe/Africa Zone Group II Group B	13 April	Clay	Cairo, Egypt	Liechtenstein	2 – 1	Won
2016	Europe/Africa Zone Group II Group B	14 April	Clay	Cairo, Egypt	Egypt	3 – 0	Won
2016	Europe/Africa Zone Group II Group B	15 April	Clay	Cairo, Egypt	Austria	1 – 2	Lost
2016	Europe/Africa Zone Group II Promotion play-offs	16 April	Clay	Cairo, Egypt	Denmark	2 – 1	Promoted
2017	Europe/Africa Zone Group I Group B	8 February	Hard	Tallinn, Estonia	Croatia	0 – 3	Lost
2017	Europe/Africa Zone Group I Group B	9 February	Hard	Tallinn, Estonia	Hungary	0 – 3	Lost
2017	Europe/Africa Zone Group I Relegation play-offs	11 February	Hard	Tallinn, Estonia	Portugal	1 – 2	Relegated
2018	Europe/Africa Zone Group II Group B	18 April	Clay	Athens, Greece	Luxembourg	1 – 2	Lost
2018	Europe/Africa Zone Group II Group B	19 April	Clay	Athens, Greece	Israel	1 – 2	Lost
2018	Europe/Africa Zone Group II Group B	20 April	Clay	Athens, Greece	Norway	3 – 0	Won
2018	Europe/Africa Zone Group II Relegation play-offs	21 April	Clay	Athens, Greece	Egypt	2 – 1	Won
2019	Europe/Africa Zone Group II Group A	7 February	Hard	Esch-sur-Alzette, Luxembourg	Tunisia	1 – 2	Lost
2019	Europe/Africa Zone Group II Group A	8 February	Hard	Esch-sur-Alzette, Luxembourg	Austria	0 – 3	Lost
2019	Europe/Africa Zone Group II Relegation play-offs	9 February	Hard	Esch-sur-Alzette, Luxembourg	Portugal	1 – 2	Relegated

== See also ==
- Billie Jean King Cup
- Bosnia and Herzegovina Davis Cup team
