= 2015 ITF Women's Circuit (April–June) =

The 2015 ITF Women's Circuit is the 2015 edition of the second-tier tour for women's professional tennis. It is organised by the International Tennis Federation and is a tier below the WTA Tour. The ITF Women's Circuit includes tournaments with prize money ranging from $10,000 up to $100,000.

== Key ==
$100,000 tournaments
$75,000 tournaments
$50,000 tournaments
$25,000 tournaments
$15,000 tournaments
$10,000 tournaments

== Month ==
=== April ===
Week of	Tournament	Winner	Runners-up	Semifinalists	Quarterfinalists
April 6	Seguros Bolívar Open Medellín; Medellín, Colombia; Clay $50,000+H; Singles – Doubles	(Brazil) Teliana Pereira; 7–6^{(8–6)}, 6–1	(Paraguay) Verónica Cepede Royg	(Croatia) Tereza Mrdeža (Colombia) Mariana Duque	(Spain) Lourdes Domínguez Lino (Russia) Irina Khromacheva (Austria) Patricia Mayr-Achleitner (Romania) Patricia Maria Țig
April 6	Seguros Bolívar Open Medellín; Medellín, Colombia; Clay $50,000+H; Singles – Doubles	(Spain) Lourdes Domínguez Lino (Luxembourg) Mandy Minella; 7–5, 4–6, [10–5]	(Colombia) Mariana Duque (Israel) Julia Glushko	(Croatia) Tereza Mrdeža (Colombia) Mariana Duque	(Spain) Lourdes Domínguez Lino (Russia) Irina Khromacheva (Austria) Patricia Mayr-Achleitner (Romania) Patricia Maria Țig
April 6	Ahmedabad, India; Hard $25,000; Singles and doubles draws	(Latvia) Anastasija Sevastova; 6–4, 7–6^{(7–5)}	(India) Ankita Raina	(Japan) Miyabi Inoue (Japan) Akiko Omae	(India) Prarthana Thombare (Thailand) Peangtarn Plipuech (United Kingdom) Emily Webley-Smith (India) Sowjanya Bavisetti
April 6	Ahmedabad, India; Hard $25,000; Singles and doubles draws	(Thailand) Peangtarn Plipuech (Thailand) Nungnadda Wannasuk; 6–3, 2–6, [12–10]	(Japan) Nao Hibino (India) Prarthana Thombare	(Japan) Miyabi Inoue (Japan) Akiko Omae	(India) Prarthana Thombare (Thailand) Peangtarn Plipuech (United Kingdom) Emily Webley-Smith (India) Sowjanya Bavisetti
April 6	Chiasso, Switzerland; Clay $25,000; Singles and doubles draws	(Hungary) Réka-Luca Jani; 3–6, 6–3, 7–6^{(8–6)}	(Romania) Alexandra Cadanțu	(United Kingdom) Amanda Carreras (Spain) Yvonne Cavallé Reimers	(Liechtenstein) Stephanie Vogt (Slovenia) Dalila Jakupović (Germany) Anne Schäfer (France) Fiona Ferro
April 6	Chiasso, Switzerland; Clay $25,000; Singles and doubles draws	(Romania) Diana Buzean (Hungary) Réka-Luca Jani; 6–2, 7–5	(Italy) Giulia Gatto-Monticone (Italy) Alice Matteucci	(United Kingdom) Amanda Carreras (Spain) Yvonne Cavallé Reimers	(Liechtenstein) Stephanie Vogt (Slovenia) Dalila Jakupović (Germany) Anne Schäfer (France) Fiona Ferro
April 6	Aegon GB Pro-Series Barnstaple; Barnstaple, United Kingdom; Hard (indoor) $25,000; Singles and doubles draws	(Czech Republic) Kristýna Plíšková; 6–3, 6–2	(Germany) Nina Zander	(Czech Republic) Andrea Hlaváčková (United Kingdom) Naomi Broady	(Russia) Ekaterina Bychkova (Japan) Makoto Ninomiya (France) Julie Coin (Belarus) Sviatlana Pirazhenka
April 6	Aegon GB Pro-Series Barnstaple; Barnstaple, United Kingdom; Hard (indoor) $25,000; Singles and doubles draws	(France) Stéphanie Foretz (Croatia) Ana Vrljić; 6–2, 5–7, [10–7]	(United Kingdom) Naomi Broady (Russia) Ekaterina Bychkova	(Czech Republic) Andrea Hlaváčková (United Kingdom) Naomi Broady	(Russia) Ekaterina Bychkova (Japan) Makoto Ninomiya (France) Julie Coin (Belarus) Sviatlana Pirazhenka
April 6	Jackson, United States; Clay $25,000; Singles and doubles draws	(Ukraine) Anhelina Kalinina; 6–3, 6–4	(United Kingdom) Johanna Konta	(Chinese Taipei) Hsu Chieh-yu (United States) Rianna Valdes	(Czech Republic) Kateřina Kramperová (China) Han Xinyun (United States) Jacqueline Cako (United States) Alexa Guarachi
April 6	Jackson, United States; Clay $25,000; Singles and doubles draws	(United States) Alexa Guarachi (United States) Caitlin Whoriskey; 6–7^{(4–7)}, 6–3, [11–9]	(Czech Republic) Kateřina Kramperová (Australia) Jessica Moore	(Chinese Taipei) Hsu Chieh-yu (United States) Rianna Valdes	(Czech Republic) Kateřina Kramperová (China) Han Xinyun (United States) Jacqueline Cako (United States) Alexa Guarachi
April 6	Qarshi, Uzbekistan; Hard $25,000; Singles and doubles draws	(Uzbekistan) Sabina Sharipova; 6–2, 6–3	(Russia) Ksenia Lykina	(Russia) Valeria Savinykh (Russia) Anastasia Pribylova	(Russia) Veronika Kudermetova (Russia) Olga Puchkova (Ukraine) Veronika Kapshay (Russia) Valentyna Ivakhnenko
April 6	Qarshi, Uzbekistan; Hard $25,000; Singles and doubles draws	(Russia) Valentyna Ivakhnenko (Russia) Polina Monova; 6–1, 6–3	(Kazakhstan) Kamila Kerimbayeva (Russia) Ksenia Lykina	(Russia) Valeria Savinykh (Russia) Anastasia Pribylova	(Russia) Veronika Kudermetova (Russia) Olga Puchkova (Ukraine) Veronika Kapshay (Russia) Valentyna Ivakhnenko
April 6	Santiago, Chile; Clay $15,000; Singles and doubles draws	(Chile) Fernanda Brito; 6–1, 6–0	(Argentina) Nadia Podoroska	(Mexico) Ana Sofía Sánchez (Argentina) Guadalupe Pérez Rojas	(Brazil) Eduarda Piai (Chile) Ivania Martinich (Chile) Bárbara Gatica (Argentina) Sofía Luini
April 6	Santiago, Chile; Clay $15,000; Singles and doubles draws	(Argentina) Guadalupe Pérez Rojas (Argentina) Nadia Podoroska; 6–4, 6–4	(Chile) Fernanda Brito (Brazil) Eduarda Piai	(Mexico) Ana Sofía Sánchez (Argentina) Guadalupe Pérez Rojas	(Brazil) Eduarda Piai (Chile) Ivania Martinich (Chile) Bárbara Gatica (Argentina) Sofía Luini
April 6	Dijon, France; Hard (indoor) $15,000; Singles and doubles draws	(Croatia) Jana Fett; 6–3, 6–4	(Ukraine) Marianna Zakarlyuk	(Hungary) Dalma Gálfi (Netherlands) Michaëlla Krajicek	(Israel) Deniz Khazaniuk (France) Constance Sibille (Serbia) Doroteja Erić (Bulgaria) Isabella Shinikova
April 6	Dijon, France; Hard (indoor) $15,000; Singles and doubles draws	(Russia) Olga Doroshina (Belarus) Lidziya Marozava; 4–6, 6–2, [10–2]	(Germany) Nicola Geuer (Germany) Laura Schaeder	(Hungary) Dalma Gálfi (Netherlands) Michaëlla Krajicek	(Israel) Deniz Khazaniuk (France) Constance Sibille (Serbia) Doroteja Erić (Bulgaria) Isabella Shinikova
April 6	León, Mexico; Hard $15,000; Singles and doubles draws	(United States) Danielle Lao; 3–6, 6–3, 7–5	(Bulgaria) Aleksandrina Naydenova	(Japan) Mayo Hibi (Mexico) Ximena Hermoso	(United States) Dasha Ivanova (Japan) Ayaka Okuno (Dominican Republic) Francesca Segarelli (Mexico) Victoria Rodríguez
April 6	León, Mexico; Hard $15,000; Singles and doubles draws	(Brazil) Maria Fernanda Alves (United States) Danielle Lao; 5–7, 7–6^{(7–5)}, [10–4]	(Germany) Kim Grajdek (Japan) Mayo Hibi	(Japan) Mayo Hibi (Mexico) Ximena Hermoso	(United States) Dasha Ivanova (Japan) Ayaka Okuno (Dominican Republic) Francesca Segarelli (Mexico) Victoria Rodríguez
April 6	Cairo, Egypt; Clay $10,000; Singles and doubles draws	(Hungary) Naomi Totka; 6–2, 6–4	(Russia) Anna Morgina	(France) Harmony Tan (Serbia) Bojana Marinković	(Slovakia) Zuzana Zlochová (Bosnia and Herzegovina) Anita Husarić (Bosnia and Herzegovina) Dea Herdželaš (Germany) Christina Shakovets
April 6	Cairo, Egypt; Clay $10,000; Singles and doubles draws	(Spain) Arabela Fernández Rabener (Germany) Christina Shakovets; 6–4, 6–2	(Russia) Alina Mikheeva (Hungary) Naomi Totka	(France) Harmony Tan (Serbia) Bojana Marinković	(Slovakia) Zuzana Zlochová (Bosnia and Herzegovina) Anita Husarić (Bosnia and Herzegovina) Dea Herdželaš (Germany) Christina Shakovets
April 6	Heraklion, Greece; Hard $10,000; Singles and doubles draws	(Slovakia) Viktória Kužmová; 6–3, 6–4	(Greece) Valentini Grammatikopoulou	(Italy) Francesca Palmigiano (Russia) Anastasiya Komardina	(Serbia) Milana Špremo (Israel) Saray Sterenbach (Germany) Anna Zaja (Hungary) Csilla Argyelán
April 6	Heraklion, Greece; Hard $10,000; Singles and doubles draws	(Greece) Valentini Grammatikopoulou (Russia) Anastasiya Komardina; 6–2, 6–2	(Serbia) Tamara Čurović (Greece) Despina Papamichail	(Italy) Francesca Palmigiano (Russia) Anastasiya Komardina	(Serbia) Milana Špremo (Israel) Saray Sterenbach (Germany) Anna Zaja (Hungary) Csilla Argyelán
April 6	Pula, Italy; Clay $10,000; Singles and doubles draws	(Romania) Irina Maria Bara; 6–1, 7–5	(Italy) Stefania Rubini	(France) Joséphine Boualem (Spain) Ariadna Martí Riembau	(Italy) Georgia Brescia (France) Jade Suvrijn (Switzerland) Lisa Sabino (France) Marie Témin
April 6	Pula, Italy; Clay $10,000; Singles and doubles draws	(Romania) Irina Maria Bara (Romania) Oana Georgeta Simion; 7–5, 6–4	(France) Margot Yerolymos (Belgium) Kimberley Zimmermann	(France) Joséphine Boualem (Spain) Ariadna Martí Riembau	(Italy) Georgia Brescia (France) Jade Suvrijn (Switzerland) Lisa Sabino (France) Marie Témin
April 6	Port El Kantaoui, Tunisia; Hard $10,000; Singles and doubles draws	(Romania) Mihaela Buzărnescu; 6–1, 6–0	(Slovenia) Natalija Šipek	(France) Laëtitia Sarrazin (Belarus) Sadafmoh Tolibova	(Liechtenstein) Kathinka von Deichmann (Italy) Valeria Prosperi (Spain) Ainhoa Atucha Gómez (Italy) Anna Maria Procacci
April 6	Port El Kantaoui, Tunisia; Hard $10,000; Singles and doubles draws	(Romania) Mihaela Buzărnescu (Ukraine) Olena Kyrpot; 6–4, 6–2	(Republic of Ireland) Jenny Claffey (Liechtenstein) Kathinka von Deichmann	(France) Laëtitia Sarrazin (Belarus) Sadafmoh Tolibova	(Liechtenstein) Kathinka von Deichmann (Italy) Valeria Prosperi (Spain) Ainhoa Atucha Gómez (Italy) Anna Maria Procacci
April 6	Antalya, Turkey; Hard $10,000; Singles and doubles draws	(China) Lu Jiajing; 6–2, 6–0	(Russia) Anna Kalinskaya	(Ukraine) Alyona Sotnikova (Czech Republic) Tereza Malíková	(Hungary) Vanda Lukács (Slovakia) Natália Vajdová (Slovakia) Chantal Škamlová (Croatia) Adrijana Lekaj
April 6	Antalya, Turkey; Hard $10,000; Singles and doubles draws	(Ukraine) Alona Fomina (Slovakia) Chantal Škamlová; 6–2, 6–1	(Russia) Ksenia Gaydarzhi (Australia) Sara Tomic	(Ukraine) Alyona Sotnikova (Czech Republic) Tereza Malíková	(Hungary) Vanda Lukács (Slovakia) Natália Vajdová (Slovakia) Chantal Škamlová (Croatia) Adrijana Lekaj
April 13	Pelham, United States; Clay $25,000; Singles and doubles draws	(Ukraine) Anhelina Kalinina; 6–3, 7–5	(Germany) Laura Siegemund	(China) Zhu Lin (United Kingdom) Johanna Konta	(Ukraine) Elizaveta Ianchuk (Ukraine) Olga Ianchuk (Poland) Katarzyna Piter (Japan) Miharu Imanishi
April 13	Pelham, United States; Clay $25,000; Singles and doubles draws	Doubles competition not completed due to bad weather		(China) Zhu Lin (United Kingdom) Johanna Konta	(Ukraine) Elizaveta Ianchuk (Ukraine) Olga Ianchuk (Poland) Katarzyna Piter (Japan) Miharu Imanishi
April 13	Cairo, Egypt; Clay $10,000; Singles and doubles draws	(Slovakia) Tereza Mihalíková; 7–5, 6–3	(Bosnia and Herzegovina) Dea Herdželaš	(Russia) Anna Morgina (Egypt) Sandra Samir	(Egypt) Dina Hegab (Spain) Arabela Fernández Rabener (Egypt) Ola Abou Zekry (France) Harmony Tan
April 13	Cairo, Egypt; Clay $10,000; Singles and doubles draws	(France) Marine Partaud (Hungary) Naomi Totka; 6–2, 7–5	(Slovakia) Barbara Kötelesová (Slovakia) Tereza Mihalíková	(Russia) Anna Morgina (Egypt) Sandra Samir	(Egypt) Dina Hegab (Spain) Arabela Fernández Rabener (Egypt) Ola Abou Zekry (France) Harmony Tan
April 13	Heraklion, Greece; Hard $10,000; Singles and doubles draws	(Romania) Raluca Șerban; 6–2, 6–3	(Spain) Cristina Sánchez Quintanar	(Chinese Taipei) Lee Pei-chi (Israel) Ofri Lankri	(South Africa) Natasha Fourouclas (Switzerland) Lisa Sabino (United States) Kristina Smith (Austria) Lisa-Maria Moser
April 13	Heraklion, Greece; Hard $10,000; Singles and doubles draws	(India) Sharmada Balu (Chinese Taipei) Lee Pei-chi; 4–6, 6–3, [10–2]	(Serbia) Tamara Čurović (Belarus) Aryna Sabalenka	(Chinese Taipei) Lee Pei-chi (Israel) Ofri Lankri	(South Africa) Natasha Fourouclas (Switzerland) Lisa Sabino (United States) Kristina Smith (Austria) Lisa-Maria Moser
April 13	Pula, Italy; Clay $10,000; Singles and doubles draws	(Italy) Nastassja Burnett; 6–2, 6–2	(Italy) Alice Balducci	(Italy) Alice Matteucci (Italy) Jasmine Paolini	(Switzerland) Tess Sugnaux (Italy) Cristiana Ferrando (Georgia (country)) Sofia Kvatsabaia (Italy) Anna Remondina
April 13	Pula, Italy; Clay $10,000; Singles and doubles draws	(Italy) Alice Matteucci (Italy) Martina Trevisan; 6–2, 6–3	(Italy) Giorgia Marchetti (Italy) Anna Remondina	(Italy) Alice Matteucci (Italy) Jasmine Paolini	(Switzerland) Tess Sugnaux (Italy) Cristiana Ferrando (Georgia (country)) Sofia Kvatsabaia (Italy) Anna Remondina
April 13	Ponta Delgada, Portugal; Hard $10,000; Singles and doubles draws	(France) Julie Coin; 6–0, 6–1	(Spain) Georgina García Pérez	(Spain) Alba Carrillo Marín (Belgium) Hélène Scholsen	(Spain) María Martínez Martínez (Russia) Ksenia Kuznetsova (Italy) Costanza Pera (France) Amandine Cazeaux
April 13	Ponta Delgada, Portugal; Hard $10,000; Singles and doubles draws	(Portugal) Maria Palhoto (Ecuador) Charlotte Römer; 3–6, 6–3, [10–6]	(France) Amandine Cazeaux (Germany) Katharina Hering	(Spain) Alba Carrillo Marín (Belgium) Hélène Scholsen	(Spain) María Martínez Martínez (Russia) Ksenia Kuznetsova (Italy) Costanza Pera (France) Amandine Cazeaux
April 13	Port El Kantaoui, Tunisia; Hard $10,000; Singles and doubles draws	(Liechtenstein) Kathinka von Deichmann; 6–3, 6–4	(Belarus) Sadafmoh Tolibova	(Slovakia) Michaela Hončová (France) Estelle Cascino	(France) Alice Bacquié (Russia) Aminat Kushkhova (France) Laëtitia Sarrazin (France) Margot Decker
April 13	Port El Kantaoui, Tunisia; Hard $10,000; Singles and doubles draws	(France) Alice Bacquié (France) Estelle Cascino; 6–3, 4–6, [10–5]	(France) Audrey Albié (France) Carla Touly	(Slovakia) Michaela Hončová (France) Estelle Cascino	(France) Alice Bacquié (Russia) Aminat Kushkhova (France) Laëtitia Sarrazin (France) Margot Decker
April 13	Antalya, Turkey; Hard $10,000; Singles and doubles draws	(Croatia) Silvia Njirić; 6–1, 2–6, 7–5	(China) Lu Jiajing	(Romania) Daiana Negreanu (Slovakia) Chantal Škamlová	(Russia) Ksenia Gaydarzhi (Germany) Anna Gabric (Australia) Nives Baric (Switzerland) Lara Michel
April 13	Antalya, Turkey; Hard $10,000; Singles and doubles draws	(United States) Veronica Corning (Venezuela) Aymet Uzcátegui; 2–6, 7–5, [10–4]	(Slovakia) Vivien Juhászová (Slovakia) Chantal Škamlová	(Romania) Daiana Negreanu (Slovakia) Chantal Škamlová	(Russia) Ksenia Gaydarzhi (Germany) Anna Gabric (Australia) Nives Baric (Switzerland) Lara Michel
April 20	Lale Cup; Istanbul, Turkey; Hard $50,000; Singles – Doubles	(Israel) Shahar Pe'er; 1–6, 7–6^{(7–4)}, 7–5	(Czech Republic) Kristýna Plíšková	(Russia) Margarita Gasparyan (Estonia) Anett Kontaveit	(Croatia) Donna Vekić (Russia) Ekaterina Bychkova (Belarus) Olga Govortsova (Croatia) Tereza Mrdeža
April 20	Lale Cup; Istanbul, Turkey; Hard $50,000; Singles – Doubles	(Ukraine) Lyudmyla Kichenok (Ukraine) Nadiia Kichenok; 6–4, 6–3	(Russia) Valentyna Ivakhnenko (Russia) Polina Monova	(Russia) Margarita Gasparyan (Estonia) Anett Kontaveit	(Croatia) Donna Vekić (Russia) Ekaterina Bychkova (Belarus) Olga Govortsova (Croatia) Tereza Mrdeža
April 20	Hardee's Pro Classic; Dothan, United States; Clay $50,000; Singles – Doubles	(United States) Louisa Chirico; 7–6^{(7–1)}, 3–6, 7–6^{(7–1)}	(United States) Katerina Stewart	(Brazil) Paula Cristina Gonçalves (Serbia) Jovana Jakšić	(United States) Alexandra Stevenson (United States) Samantha Crawford (United States) Jessica Pegula (Portugal) Michelle Larcher de Brito
April 20	Hardee's Pro Classic; Dothan, United States; Clay $50,000; Singles – Doubles	(United Kingdom) Johanna Konta (United States) Maria Sanchez; 6–3, 6–4	(Brazil) Paula Cristina Gonçalves (Czech Republic) Petra Krejsová	(Brazil) Paula Cristina Gonçalves (Serbia) Jovana Jakšić	(United States) Alexandra Stevenson (United States) Samantha Crawford (United States) Jessica Pegula (Portugal) Michelle Larcher de Brito
April 20	Shenzhen, China; Hard $25,000; Singles and doubles draws	(Chinese Taipei) Hsieh Su-wei; 6–2, 6–2	(China) Yang Zhaoxuan	(China) Duan Yingying (China) Lu Jingjing	(Chinese Taipei) Chang Kai-chen (Uzbekistan) Sabina Sharipova (China) Han Xinyun (Thailand) Varatchaya Wongteanchai
April 20	Shenzhen, China; Hard $25,000; Singles and doubles draws	(Thailand) Noppawan Lertcheewakarn (China) Lu Jiajing; 6–4, 7–5	(South Korea) Han Na-lae (South Korea) Jang Su-jeong	(China) Duan Yingying (China) Lu Jingjing	(Chinese Taipei) Chang Kai-chen (Uzbekistan) Sabina Sharipova (China) Han Xinyun (Thailand) Varatchaya Wongteanchai
April 20	Pula, Italy; Clay $25,000; Singles and doubles draws	(Germany) Anne Schäfer; 6–4, 6–3	(France) Alizé Lim	(France) Fiona Ferro (Romania) Mihaela Buzărnescu	(France) Irina Ramialison (France) Myrtille Georges (Greece) Maria Sakkari (Italy) Martina Caregaro
April 20	Pula, Italy; Clay $25,000; Singles and doubles draws	(Romania) Irina Maria Bara (Romania) Mihaela Buzărnescu; 6–3, 2–6, [10–4]	(Italy) Corinna Dentoni (Italy) Claudia Giovine	(France) Fiona Ferro (Romania) Mihaela Buzărnescu	(France) Irina Ramialison (France) Myrtille Georges (Greece) Maria Sakkari (Italy) Martina Caregaro
April 20	Cairo, Egypt; Clay $15,000; Singles and doubles draws	(Poland) Katarzyna Kawa; 7–5, 6–1	(United Kingdom) Amanda Carreras	(Austria) Barbara Haas (Slovakia) Tereza Mihalíková	(France) Amandine Hesse (France) Harmony Tan (Russia) Anastasia Pivovarova (Hungary) Réka-Luca Jani
April 20	Cairo, Egypt; Clay $15,000; Singles and doubles draws	(Austria) Barbara Haas (Egypt) Sandra Samir; 0–6, 6–4, [10–7]	(France) Amandine Hesse (France) Marine Partaud	(Austria) Barbara Haas (Slovakia) Tereza Mihalíková	(France) Amandine Hesse (France) Harmony Tan (Russia) Anastasia Pivovarova (Hungary) Réka-Luca Jani
April 20	Guadalajara, Mexico; Hard $15,000; Singles and doubles draws	(Mexico) Marcela Zacarías; 4–6, 6–4, 7–5	(Mexico) Victoria Rodríguez	(Mexico) Renata Zarazúa (Mexico) Ana Sofía Sánchez	(Guatemala) Melissa Morales (Germany) Kim Grajdek (Brazil) Maria Fernanda Alves (United States) Malika Rose
April 20	Guadalajara, Mexico; Hard $15,000; Singles and doubles draws	(Brazil) Laura Pigossi (Mexico) Marcela Zacarías; 6–1, 6–2	(Brazil) Maria Fernanda Alves (Mexico) Renata Zarazúa	(Mexico) Renata Zarazúa (Mexico) Ana Sofía Sánchez	(Guatemala) Melissa Morales (Germany) Kim Grajdek (Brazil) Maria Fernanda Alves (United States) Malika Rose
April 20	Dakar, Senegal; Hard $15,000; Singles and doubles draws	(France) Kinnie Laisné; 6–3, 0–6, 6–4	(France) Clothilde de Bernardi	(Switzerland) Conny Perrin (Hungary) Naomi Totka	(United Kingdom) Naomi Cavaday (Russia) Ekaterina Yashina (France) Lou Brouleau (Philippines) Katharina Lehnert
April 20	Dakar, Senegal; Hard $15,000; Singles and doubles draws	(Russia) Aminat Kushkhova (Russia) Margarita Lazareva; 6–3, 6–2	(Switzerland) Conny Perrin (Russia) Ekaterina Yashina	(Switzerland) Conny Perrin (Hungary) Naomi Totka	(United Kingdom) Naomi Cavaday (Russia) Ekaterina Yashina (France) Lou Brouleau (Philippines) Katharina Lehnert
April 20	Bol, Croatia; Clay $10,000; Singles and doubles draws	(Czech Republic) Gabriela Pantůčková; 1–6, 6–3, 6–4	(Croatia) Iva Mekovec	(Sweden) Kajsa Rinaldo Persson (Croatia) Tena Lukas	(Slovenia) Tamara Zidanšek (Hungary) Dalma Gálfi (Slovakia) Lenka Juríková (Czech Republic) Kateřina Kamínková
April 20	Bol, Croatia; Clay $10,000; Singles and doubles draws	(Slovenia) Pia Čuk (Slovenia) Tamara Zidanšek; 6–1, 6–1	(Slovenia) Natalija Šipek (Slovenia) Eva Zagorac	(Sweden) Kajsa Rinaldo Persson (Croatia) Tena Lukas	(Slovenia) Tamara Zidanšek (Hungary) Dalma Gálfi (Slovakia) Lenka Juríková (Czech Republic) Kateřina Kamínková
April 20	Heraklion, Greece; Hard $10,000; Singles and doubles draws	(Romania) Raluca Șerban; 4–6, 6–4, 6–1	(Hungary) Anna Bondár	(Spain) Cristina Sánchez Quintanar (Belarus) Aryna Sabalenka	(Czech Republic) Vendula Žovincová (Hungary) Csilla Argyelán (Moldova) Daniela Ciobanu (Oman) Fatma Al-Nabhani
April 20	Heraklion, Greece; Hard $10,000; Singles and doubles draws	(Hungary) Anna Bondár (Austria) Lisa-Maria Moser; 6–3, 7–5	(Oman) Fatma Al-Nabhani (India) Sharmada Balu	(Spain) Cristina Sánchez Quintanar (Belarus) Aryna Sabalenka	(Czech Republic) Vendula Žovincová (Hungary) Csilla Argyelán (Moldova) Daniela Ciobanu (Oman) Fatma Al-Nabhani
April 20	Shymkent, Kazakhstan; Clay $10,000; Singles and doubles draws	(Kyrgyzstan) Ksenia Palkina; 6–4, 6–4	(Russia) Ksenija Sharifova	(Russia) Anastasia Rudakova (Kazakhstan) Kamila Kerimbayeva	(Russia) Evgeniya Levashova (Russia) Valeriya Urzhumova (Russia) Alena Tarasova (Russia) Liubov Vasilyeva
April 20	Shymkent, Kazakhstan; Clay $10,000; Singles and doubles draws	(Russia) Irina Lidkovskaya (Russia) Aleksandra Pospelova; 7–6^{(7–5)}, 6–1	(Russia) Elizaveta Khabarova (Uzbekistan) Guzal Yusupova	(Russia) Anastasia Rudakova (Kazakhstan) Kamila Kerimbayeva	(Russia) Evgeniya Levashova (Russia) Valeriya Urzhumova (Russia) Alena Tarasova (Russia) Liubov Vasilyeva
April 20	Ponta Delgada, Portugal; Hard $10,000; Singles and doubles draws	(Spain) Georgina García Pérez; 6–2, 6–1	(Netherlands) Kelly Versteeg	(Finland) Piia Suomalainen (Portugal) Maria João Koehler	(Spain) Nuria Párrizas Díaz (Germany) Vivian Heisen (Spain) Alba Carrillo Marín (Ecuador) Charlotte Römer
April 20	Ponta Delgada, Portugal; Hard $10,000; Singles and doubles draws	(Portugal) Maria Palhoto (Ecuador) Charlotte Römer; 7–5, 3–6, [10–0]	(Spain) Georgina García Pérez (Spain) Olga Parres Azcoitia	(Finland) Piia Suomalainen (Portugal) Maria João Koehler	(Spain) Nuria Párrizas Díaz (Germany) Vivian Heisen (Spain) Alba Carrillo Marín (Ecuador) Charlotte Römer
April 20	Port El Kantaoui, Tunisia; Hard $10,000; Singles and doubles draws	(Italy) Valeria Prosperi; 2–6, 6–0, 6–2	(Netherlands) Janneke Wikkerink	(India) Eetee Maheta (Republic of Ireland) Jenny Claffey	(France) Anaïs Van Cauter (France) Margot Decker (France) Clémence Fayol (France) Carla Touly
April 20	Port El Kantaoui, Tunisia; Hard $10,000; Singles and doubles draws	(Republic of Ireland) Jenny Claffey (Liechtenstein) Kathinka von Deichmann; 6–4, 6–2	(India) Eetee Maheta (Russia) Greta Mokrousova	(India) Eetee Maheta (Republic of Ireland) Jenny Claffey	(France) Anaïs Van Cauter (France) Margot Decker (France) Clémence Fayol (France) Carla Touly
April 27	Kangaroo Cup; Gifu, Japan; Hard $75,000; Singles – Doubles	(China) Zheng Saisai; 3–6, 7–5, 6–4	(Japan) Naomi Osaka	(Japan) Mayo Hibi (China) Xu Yifan	(Czech Republic) Kristýna Plíšková (China) Duan Yingying (Serbia) Ivana Jorović (Japan) Miharu Imanishi
April 27	Kangaroo Cup; Gifu, Japan; Hard $75,000; Singles – Doubles	(China) Wang Yafan (China) Xu Yifan; 6–2, 6–3	(Belgium) An-Sophie Mestach (United Kingdom) Emily Webley-Smith	(Japan) Mayo Hibi (China) Xu Yifan	(Czech Republic) Kristýna Plíšková (China) Duan Yingying (Serbia) Ivana Jorović (Japan) Miharu Imanishi
April 27	Boyd Tinsley Women's Clay Court Classic; Charlottesville, United States; Clay $50,000; Singles – Doubles	(United States) Allie Kiick; 7–5, 6–7^{(3–7)}, 7–5	(United States) Katerina Stewart	(Argentina) Florencia Molinero (Ukraine) Elizaveta Ianchuk	(United States) Usue Maitane Arconada (Canada) Françoise Abanda (Portugal) Michelle Larcher de Brito (Russia) Irina Khromacheva
April 27	Boyd Tinsley Women's Clay Court Classic; Charlottesville, United States; Clay $50,000; Singles – Doubles	(Canada) Françoise Abanda (United States) Maria Sanchez; 6–1, 6–3	(Ukraine) Olga Ianchuk (Russia) Irina Khromacheva	(Argentina) Florencia Molinero (Ukraine) Elizaveta Ianchuk	(United States) Usue Maitane Arconada (Canada) Françoise Abanda (Portugal) Michelle Larcher de Brito (Russia) Irina Khromacheva
April 27	Nanning, China; Hard $25,000; Singles and doubles draws	(Chinese Taipei) Hsieh Su-wei; 6–2, 6–3	(South Korea) Jang Su-jeong	(China) Zhang Yuxuan (Uzbekistan) Sabina Sharipova	(China) Liu Fangzhou (South Korea) Han Na-lae (South Africa) Chanel Simmonds (Thailand) Nudnida Luangnam
April 27	Nanning, China; Hard $25,000; Singles and doubles draws	(China) Liu Chang (China) Lu Jiajing; 1–6, 6–1, [10–8]	(China) Yang Zhaoxuan (China) Ye Qiuyu	(China) Zhang Yuxuan (Uzbekistan) Sabina Sharipova	(China) Liu Fangzhou (South Korea) Han Na-lae (South Africa) Chanel Simmonds (Thailand) Nudnida Luangnam
April 27	Wiesbaden, Germany; Clay $25,000; Singles and doubles draws	(Latvia) Anastasija Sevastova; 6–1, 6–3	(Czech Republic) Tereza Martincová	(Russia) Polina Vinogradova (Netherlands) Cindy Burger	(United Kingdom) Tara Moore (Germany) Carolin Daniels (Bulgaria) Dia Evtimova (Venezuela) Andrea Gámiz
April 27	Wiesbaden, Germany; Clay $25,000; Singles and doubles draws	(Germany) Carolin Daniels (Switzerland) Viktorija Golubic; 6–4, 4–6, [10–6]	(Netherlands) Cindy Burger (Ukraine) Veronika Kapshay	(Russia) Polina Vinogradova (Netherlands) Cindy Burger	(United Kingdom) Tara Moore (Germany) Carolin Daniels (Bulgaria) Dia Evtimova (Venezuela) Andrea Gámiz
April 27	Pula, Italy; Clay $25,000; Singles and doubles draws	(Belgium) Elise Mertens; 7–6^{(8–6)}, 6–4	(Spain) Yvonne Cavallé Reimers	(France) Myrtille Georges (France) Mathilde Johansson	(Spain) Laura Pous Tió (Greece) Maria Sakkari (Ukraine) Valeriya Strakhova (Romania) Mihaela Buzărnescu
April 27	Pula, Italy; Clay $25,000; Singles and doubles draws	(Slovenia) Nastja Kolar (Greece) Despina Papamichail; 6–1, 1–6, [10–8]	(Romania) Diana Buzean (Italy) Alice Matteucci	(France) Myrtille Georges (France) Mathilde Johansson	(Spain) Laura Pous Tió (Greece) Maria Sakkari (Ukraine) Valeriya Strakhova (Romania) Mihaela Buzărnescu
April 27	Villa del Dique, Argentina; Clay $10,000; Singles and doubles draws	(Chile) Fernanda Brito; 7–5, 6–3	(Argentina) Guadalupe Pérez Rojas	(Brazil) Nathaly Kurata (Argentina) Constanza Vega	(Argentina) Melina Ferrero (Argentina) Sofía Luini (Brazil) Eduarda Piai (Chile) Bárbara Gatica
April 27	Villa del Dique, Argentina; Clay $10,000; Singles and doubles draws	(Chile) Fernanda Brito (Paraguay) Camila Giangreco Campiz; 6–3, 6–7^{(4–7)}, [10–6]	(Argentina) Ana Victoria Gobbi Monllau (Argentina) Constanza Vega	(Brazil) Nathaly Kurata (Argentina) Constanza Vega	(Argentina) Melina Ferrero (Argentina) Sofía Luini (Brazil) Eduarda Piai (Chile) Bárbara Gatica
April 27	Sharm el-Sheikh, Egypt; Hard $10,000; Singles and doubles draws	(Spain) Nuria Párrizas Díaz; 6–2, 6–4	(Italy) Anastasia Grymalska	(France) Victoria Muntean (United States) Nadja Gilchrist	(India) Dhruthi Tatachar Venugopal (Spain) Irene Burillo Escorihuela (Hungary) Naomi Totka (Russia) Yulia Bryzgalova
April 27	Sharm el-Sheikh, Egypt; Hard $10,000; Singles and doubles draws	(Russia) Yulia Bryzgalova (Russia) Alina Mikheeva; 6–3, 6–1	(Italy) Giada Clerici (Italy) Anastasia Grymalska	(France) Victoria Muntean (United States) Nadja Gilchrist	(India) Dhruthi Tatachar Venugopal (Spain) Irene Burillo Escorihuela (Hungary) Naomi Totka (Russia) Yulia Bryzgalova
April 27	Heraklion, Greece; Hard $10,000; Singles and doubles draws	(Oman) Fatma Al-Nabhani; 7–5, 6–3	(Germany) Tayisiya Morderger	(Bulgaria) Julia Stamatova (Spain) Cristina Sánchez Quintanar	(Liechtenstein) Kathinka von Deichmann (Australia) Sara Tomic (Romania) Elena-Teodora Cadar (Australia) Kimberly Birrell
April 27	Heraklion, Greece; Hard $10,000; Singles and doubles draws	(Oman) Fatma Al-Nabhani (Spain) Cristina Sánchez Quintanar; 6–4, 6–1	(Japan) Yoshimi Kawasaki (Romania) Daiana Negreanu	(Bulgaria) Julia Stamatova (Spain) Cristina Sánchez Quintanar	(Liechtenstein) Kathinka von Deichmann (Australia) Sara Tomic (Romania) Elena-Teodora Cadar (Australia) Kimberly Birrell
April 27	Shymkent, Kazakhstan; Clay $10,000; Singles and doubles draws	(Russia) Valeriya Urzhumova; 6–1, 6–3	(Russia) Alena Tarasova	(Russia) Anastasia Rudakova (Russia) Daria Lodikova	(Russia) Liubov Vasilyeva (Russia) Alexandra Dubrovina (Uzbekistan) Polina Merenkova (Russia) Ksenija Sharifova
April 27	Shymkent, Kazakhstan; Clay $10,000; Singles and doubles draws	(Uzbekistan) Albina Khabibulina (Uzbekistan) Polina Merenkova; 6–3, 6–1	(Uzbekistan) Vlada Ekshibarova (Russia) Daria Lodikova	(Russia) Anastasia Rudakova (Russia) Daria Lodikova	(Russia) Liubov Vasilyeva (Russia) Alexandra Dubrovina (Uzbekistan) Polina Merenkova (Russia) Ksenija Sharifova
April 27	Antalya, Turkey; Hard $10,000; Singles and doubles draws	(Romania) Nicoleta Dascălu; 6–4, 6–4	(Mexico) Camila Fuentes	(Romania) Simona Ionescu (Slovakia) Viktória Kužmová	(Hungary) Vanda Lukács (Russia) Shakhlo Saidova (Netherlands) Kelly Versteeg (Romania) Andreea Ghițescu
April 27	Antalya, Turkey; Hard $10,000; Singles and doubles draws	(Romania) Nicoleta Dascălu (Romania) Andreea Ghițescu; 6–3, 6–1	(Mexico) Camila Fuentes (Turkey) Müge Topsel	(Romania) Simona Ionescu (Slovakia) Viktória Kužmová	(Hungary) Vanda Lukács (Russia) Shakhlo Saidova (Netherlands) Kelly Versteeg (Romania) Andreea Ghițescu

=== May ===
Week of	Tournament	Winner	Runners-up	Semifinalists	Quarterfinalists
May 4	Open GDF Suez de Cagnes-sur-Mer Alpes-Maritimes; Cagnes-sur-Mer, France; Clay $100,000; Singles – Doubles	(Germany) Carina Witthöft; 7–5, 6–1	(Germany) Tatjana Maria	(Netherlands) Kiki Bertens (France) Pauline Parmentier	(Canada) Sharon Fichman (Belarus) Aliaksandra Sasnovich (Russia) Daria Gavrilova (Kazakhstan) Yulia Putintseva
May 4	Open GDF Suez de Cagnes-sur-Mer Alpes-Maritimes; Cagnes-sur-Mer, France; Clay $100,000; Singles – Doubles	(United Kingdom) Johanna Konta (France) Laura Thorpe; 1–6, 6–4, [10–5]	(United Kingdom) Jocelyn Rae (United Kingdom) Anna Smith	(Netherlands) Kiki Bertens (France) Pauline Parmentier	(Canada) Sharon Fichman (Belarus) Aliaksandra Sasnovich (Russia) Daria Gavrilova (Kazakhstan) Yulia Putintseva
May 4	Empire Slovak Open; Trnava, Slovakia; Clay $100,000; Singles – Doubles	(Montenegro) Danka Kovinić; 7–5, 6–3	(Russia) Margarita Gasparyan	(Latvia) Jeļena Ostapenko (Czech Republic) Denisa Allertová	(Czech Republic) Tereza Smitková (Croatia) Petra Martić (Russia) Victoria Kan (Serbia) Aleksandra Krunić
May 4	Empire Slovak Open; Trnava, Slovakia; Clay $100,000; Singles – Doubles	(Ukraine) Yuliya Beygelzimer (Russia) Margarita Gasparyan; 6–3, 6–2	(Serbia) Aleksandra Krunić (Croatia) Petra Martić	(Latvia) Jeļena Ostapenko (Czech Republic) Denisa Allertová	(Czech Republic) Tereza Smitková (Croatia) Petra Martić (Russia) Victoria Kan (Serbia) Aleksandra Krunić
May 4	Anning Open; Anning, China; Clay $75,000; Singles – Doubles	(China) Zheng Saisai; 6–4, 3–6, 6–4	(China) Han Xinyun	(China) Wang Yafan (China) Yang Zhaoxuan	(Bulgaria) Aleksandrina Naydenova (United States) Lauren Embree (South Africa) Chanel Simmonds (China) Wang Qiang
May 4	Anning Open; Anning, China; Clay $75,000; Singles – Doubles	(China) Xu Yifan (China) Zheng Saisai; 7–5, 6–2	(China) Yang Zhaoxuan (China) Ye Qiuyu	(China) Wang Yafan (China) Yang Zhaoxuan	(Bulgaria) Aleksandrina Naydenova (United States) Lauren Embree (South Africa) Chanel Simmonds (China) Wang Qiang
May 4	Fukuoka International Women's Cup; Fukuoka, Japan; Grass $50,000; Singles – Doubles	(Czech Republic) Kristýna Plíšková; 7–5, 6–4	(Japan) Nao Hibino	(Thailand) Varatchaya Wongteanchai (Japan) Junri Namigata	(Belgium) An-Sophie Mestach (Japan) Miyu Kato (Japan) Erika Sema (Slovenia) Dalila Jakupović
May 4	Fukuoka International Women's Cup; Fukuoka, Japan; Grass $50,000; Singles – Doubles	(United Kingdom) Naomi Broady (Czech Republic) Kristýna Plíšková; 6–3, 6–4	(Japan) Eri Hozumi (Japan) Junri Namigata	(Thailand) Varatchaya Wongteanchai (Japan) Junri Namigata	(Belgium) An-Sophie Mestach (Japan) Miyu Kato (Japan) Erika Sema (Slovenia) Dalila Jakupović
May 4	Nana Trophy; Tunis, Tunisia; Clay $50,000; Singles – Doubles	(Argentina) María Irigoyen; 6–2, 7–5	(Netherlands) Cindy Burger	(Netherlands) Lesley Kerkhove (Greece) Maria Sakkari	(Tunisia) Ons Jabeur (Bulgaria) Elitsa Kostova (Japan) Risa Ozaki (Sweden) Rebecca Peterson
May 4	Nana Trophy; Tunis, Tunisia; Clay $50,000; Singles – Doubles	(Argentina) María Irigoyen (Poland) Paula Kania; 6–1, 6–3	(France) Julie Coin (France) Stéphanie Foretz	(Netherlands) Lesley Kerkhove (Greece) Maria Sakkari	(Tunisia) Ons Jabeur (Bulgaria) Elitsa Kostova (Japan) Risa Ozaki (Sweden) Rebecca Peterson
May 4	Revolution Technologies Pro Tennis Classic; Indian Harbour Beach, United States; Clay $50,000; Singles – Doubles	(United States) Katerina Stewart; 6–4, 3–6, 6–3	(United States) Louisa Chirico	(United States) Maria Sanchez (United States) Allie Kiick	(Australia) Storm Sanders (Canada) Françoise Abanda (Argentina) Paula Ormaechea (Australia) Jessica Moore
May 4	Revolution Technologies Pro Tennis Classic; Indian Harbour Beach, United States; Clay $50,000; Singles – Doubles	(United States) Maria Sanchez (United States) Taylor Townsend; 6–0, 6–1	(Russia) Angelina Gabueva (United States) Alexandra Stevenson	(United States) Maria Sanchez (United States) Allie Kiick	(Australia) Storm Sanders (Canada) Françoise Abanda (Argentina) Paula Ormaechea (Australia) Jessica Moore
May 4	Ciudad Obregón, Mexico; Hard $15,000; Singles and doubles draws	(Mexico) Marcela Zacarías; 6–4, 5–7, 2–1, ret.	(Serbia) Vojislava Lukić	(Mexico) Victoria Rodríguez (United States) Lauren Albanese	(United States) Jennifer Elie (Dominican Republic) Francesca Segarelli (Paraguay) Ana Paula Neffa de los Ríos (Mexico) Ana Sofía Sánchez
May 4	Ciudad Obregón, Mexico; Hard $15,000; Singles and doubles draws	(Mexico) Victoria Rodríguez (Mexico) Marcela Zacarías; 6–3, 6–1	(Mexico) Ana Sofía Sánchez (Dominican Republic) Francesca Segarelli	(Mexico) Victoria Rodríguez (United States) Lauren Albanese	(United States) Jennifer Elie (Dominican Republic) Francesca Segarelli (Paraguay) Ana Paula Neffa de los Ríos (Mexico) Ana Sofía Sánchez
May 4	Villa María, Argentina; Clay $10,000; Singles and doubles draws	(Chile) Fernanda Brito; 6–3, 4–6, 7–6^{(7–2)}	(Argentina) Julieta Estable	(Argentina) Sofía Luini (Argentina) Guadalupe Pérez Rojas	(Argentina) Carla Lucero (Argentina) Stephanie Petit (Argentina) Berta Bonardi (Chile) Bárbara Gatica
May 4	Villa María, Argentina; Clay $10,000; Singles and doubles draws	(Argentina) Ana Victoria Gobbi Monllau (Argentina) Constanza Vega; 6–2, 6–3	(Brazil) Nathaly Kurata (Brazil) Eduarda Piai	(Argentina) Sofía Luini (Argentina) Guadalupe Pérez Rojas	(Argentina) Carla Lucero (Argentina) Stephanie Petit (Argentina) Berta Bonardi (Chile) Bárbara Gatica
May 4	Bol, Croatia; Clay $10,000; Singles and doubles draws	(Croatia) Tena Lukas; 6–2, 6–3	(Slovenia) Tamara Zidanšek	(Italy) Anna Remondina (Slovakia) Zuzana Luknárová	(Germany) Katharina Hobgarski (Germany) Christina Shakovets (Slovenia) Pia Čuk (North Macedonia) Lina Gjorcheska
May 4	Bol, Croatia; Clay $10,000; Singles and doubles draws	(North Macedonia) Lina Gjorcheska (Croatia) Tena Lukas; 6–0, 6–3	(Moldova) Alexandra Perper (Moldova) Anastasia Vdovenco	(Italy) Anna Remondina (Slovakia) Zuzana Luknárová	(Germany) Katharina Hobgarski (Germany) Christina Shakovets (Slovenia) Pia Čuk (North Macedonia) Lina Gjorcheska
May 4	Sharm el-Sheikh, Egypt; Hard $10,000; Singles and doubles draws	(United States) Nadja Gilchrist; 4–6, 7–5, 6–3	(Spain) Nuria Párrizas Díaz	(India) Dhruthi Tatachar Venugopal (Russia) Yulia Bryzgalova	(Ukraine) Anastasia Kharchenko (France) Léa Tholey (Russia) Elizaveta Khabarova (Egypt) Ola Abou Zekry
May 4	Sharm el-Sheikh, Egypt; Hard $10,000; Singles and doubles draws	(Belgium) Britt Geukens (India) Dhruthi Tatachar Venugopal; 6–2, 7–6^{(9–7)}	(Egypt) Ola Abou Zekry (Ukraine) Anastasia Kharchenko	(India) Dhruthi Tatachar Venugopal (Russia) Yulia Bryzgalova	(Ukraine) Anastasia Kharchenko (France) Léa Tholey (Russia) Elizaveta Khabarova (Egypt) Ola Abou Zekry
May 4	Mytilene, Greece; Hard $10,000; Singles and doubles draws	(Bulgaria) Julia Stamatova; 7–6^{(7–4)}, 1–6, 7–6^{(7–4)}	(Russia) Ksenia Gaydarzhi	(Australia) Sara Tomic (Greece) Valentini Grammatikopoulou	(Romania) Daiana Negreanu (Czech Republic) Gabriela Horáčková (Germany) Kim Grajdek (Spain) Olga Parres Azcoitia
May 4	Mytilene, Greece; Hard $10,000; Singles and doubles draws	(Greece) Valentini Grammatikopoulou (Netherlands) Rosalie van der Hoek; 6–4, 6–3	(Japan) Yoshimi Kawasaki (Romania) Daiana Negreanu	(Australia) Sara Tomic (Greece) Valentini Grammatikopoulou	(Romania) Daiana Negreanu (Czech Republic) Gabriela Horáčková (Germany) Kim Grajdek (Spain) Olga Parres Azcoitia
May 4	Ashkelon, Israel; Hard $10,000; Singles and doubles draws	(Israel) Saray Sterenbach; 6–1, 6–4	(Israel) Deniz Khazaniuk	(Georgia (country)) Mariam Bolkvadze (France) Amandine Cazeaux	(Ukraine) Oleksandra Piskun (Belarus) Sadafmoh Tolibova (Israel) Ofri Lankri (Hungary) Naomi Totka
May 4	Ashkelon, Israel; Hard $10,000; Singles and doubles draws	(Georgia (country)) Mariam Bolkvadze (Hungary) Naomi Totka; 6–0, 6–2	(United Kingdom) Laura Deigman (Belgium) Hélène Scholsen	(Georgia (country)) Mariam Bolkvadze (France) Amandine Cazeaux	(Ukraine) Oleksandra Piskun (Belarus) Sadafmoh Tolibova (Israel) Ofri Lankri (Hungary) Naomi Totka
May 4	Pula, Italy; Clay $10,000; Singles and doubles draws	(Italy) Bianca Turati; 2–6, 6–4, 7–5	(Spain) Aliona Bolsova Zadoinov	(France) Laëtitia Sarrazin (Spain) Eva Guerrero Álvarez	(Italy) Beatrice Lombardo (Russia) Olesya Pervushina (Bosnia and Herzegovina) Jelena Simić (Switzerland) Tess Sugnaux
May 4	Pula, Italy; Clay $10,000; Singles and doubles draws	(Spain) Aliona Bolsova Zadoinov (Australia) Priscilla Hon; 6–0, 6–3	(Spain) Cristina Bucșa (Spain) Eva Guerrero Álvarez	(France) Laëtitia Sarrazin (Spain) Eva Guerrero Álvarez	(Italy) Beatrice Lombardo (Russia) Olesya Pervushina (Bosnia and Herzegovina) Jelena Simić (Switzerland) Tess Sugnaux
May 4	Puszczykowo, Poland; Hard $10,000; Singles and doubles draws	(Georgia (country)) Sofia Kvatsabaia; 6–1, 6–1	(Germany) Natalia Siedliska	(Czech Republic) Petra Rohanová (Slovakia) Zuzana Zlochová	(Philippines) Katharina Lehnert (Poland) Olga Brózda (Czech Republic) Tereza Malíková (South Africa) Natasha Fourouclas
May 4	Puszczykowo, Poland; Hard $10,000; Singles and doubles draws	(Russia) Margarita Lazareva (Philippines) Katharina Lehnert; 6–3, 6–3	(Brazil) Maria Fernanda Alves (Slovakia) Zuzana Zlochová	(Czech Republic) Petra Rohanová (Slovakia) Zuzana Zlochová	(Philippines) Katharina Lehnert (Poland) Olga Brózda (Czech Republic) Tereza Malíková (South Africa) Natasha Fourouclas
May 4	Båstad, Sweden; Clay $10,000; Singles and doubles draws	(Germany) Laura Schaeder; 5–7, 6–0, 6–2	(Sweden) Kajsa Rinaldo Persson	(Germany) Carolin Daniels (Ukraine) Olga Fridman	(Sweden) Maja Örnberg (Bosnia and Herzegovina) Dea Herdželaš (Colombia) Yuliana Lizarazo (Norway) Melanie Stokke
May 4	Båstad, Sweden; Clay $10,000; Singles and doubles draws	(Sweden) Cornelia Lister (Colombia) Yuliana Lizarazo; 7–5, 5–7, [10–8]	(Germany) Carolin Daniels (Germany) Laura Schaeder	(Germany) Carolin Daniels (Ukraine) Olga Fridman	(Sweden) Maja Örnberg (Bosnia and Herzegovina) Dea Herdželaš (Colombia) Yuliana Lizarazo (Norway) Melanie Stokke
May 4	Antalya, Turkey; Hard $10,000; Singles and doubles draws	(Slovakia) Viktória Kužmová; 6–3, 7–6^{(7–5)}	(Ukraine) Alyona Sotnikova	(Romania) Andreea Ghițescu (United Kingdom) Anna Brogan	(Japan) Rio Kitagawa (Romania) Mihaela Buzărnescu (Croatia) Ena Kajević (Romania) Nicoleta Dascălu
May 4	Antalya, Turkey; Hard $10,000; Singles and doubles draws	(Bosnia and Herzegovina) Anita Husarić (Ukraine) Alyona Sotnikova; 6–1, 6–2	(Romania) Nicoleta Dascălu (Italy) Camilla Rosatello	(Romania) Andreea Ghițescu (United Kingdom) Anna Brogan	(Japan) Rio Kitagawa (Romania) Mihaela Buzărnescu (Croatia) Ena Kajević (Romania) Nicoleta Dascălu
May 11	Open Engie Saint-Gaudens Midi-Pyrénées; Saint-Gaudens, France; Clay $50,000+H; Singles – Doubles	(Spain) María Teresa Torró Flor; 6–1, 6–0	(Slovakia) Jana Čepelová	(Belarus) Aliaksandra Sasnovich (Poland) Magda Linette	(Brazil) Teliana Pereira (Spain) Lourdes Domínguez Lino (France) Amandine Hesse (United Kingdom) Johanna Konta
May 11	Open Engie Saint-Gaudens Midi-Pyrénées; Saint-Gaudens, France; Clay $50,000+H; Singles – Doubles	(Colombia) Mariana Duque (Israel) Julia Glushko; 1–6, 7–6^{(7–5)}, [10–4]	(Brazil) Beatriz Haddad Maia (United States) Nicole Melichar	(Belarus) Aliaksandra Sasnovich (Poland) Magda Linette	(Brazil) Teliana Pereira (Spain) Lourdes Domínguez Lino (France) Amandine Hesse (United Kingdom) Johanna Konta
May 11	Kurume Best Amenity Cup; Kurume, Japan; Grass $50,000; Singles – Doubles	(Japan) Nao Hibino; 6–3, 6–1	(Japan) Eri Hozumi	(Russia) Ekaterina Bychkova (Czech Republic) Kristýna Plíšková	(Belgium) An-Sophie Mestach (South Korea) Jang Su-jeong (Japan) Miyabi Inoue (Japan) Miharu Imanishi
May 11	Kurume Best Amenity Cup; Kurume, Japan; Grass $50,000; Singles – Doubles	(Japan) Makoto Ninomiya (Japan) Riko Sawayanagi; 7–6^{(12–10)}, 6–3	(Japan) Eri Hozumi (Japan) Junri Namigata	(Russia) Ekaterina Bychkova (Czech Republic) Kristýna Plíšková	(Belgium) An-Sophie Mestach (South Korea) Jang Su-jeong (Japan) Miyabi Inoue (Japan) Miharu Imanishi
May 11	La Marsa, Tunisia; Clay $25,000; Singles and doubles draws	(Switzerland) Romina Oprandi; 6–3, 6–3	(Latvia) Anastasija Sevastova	(France) Chloé Paquet (Estonia) Anett Kontaveit	(Ukraine) Anastasiya Vasylyeva (France) Stéphanie Foretz (Turkey) İpek Soylu (France) Alizé Lim
May 11	La Marsa, Tunisia; Clay $25,000; Singles and doubles draws	(Turkey) Pemra Özgen (Turkey) İpek Soylu; 3–6, 6–3, [10–4]	(Georgia (country)) Sofia Shapatava (Ukraine) Anastasiya Vasylyeva	(France) Chloé Paquet (Estonia) Anett Kontaveit	(Ukraine) Anastasiya Vasylyeva (France) Stéphanie Foretz (Turkey) İpek Soylu (France) Alizé Lim
May 11	RBC Bank Women's Challenger; Raleigh, United States; Clay $25,000; Singles and doubles draws	(United States) Julia Boserup; 6–3, 6–2	(United States) Samantha Crawford	(Argentina) Florencia Molinero (United States) Allie Kiick	(United States) Kylie McKenzie (Chinese Taipei) Hsu Chieh-yu (Mexico) Ana Sofía Sánchez (United States) Ingrid Neel
May 11	RBC Bank Women's Challenger; Raleigh, United States; Clay $25,000; Singles and doubles draws	(United States) Jan Abaza (Poland) Justyna Jegiołka; 7–6^{(7–4)}, 4–6, [10–7]	(United States) Jacqueline Cako (Australia) Sally Peers	(Argentina) Florencia Molinero (United States) Allie Kiick	(United States) Kylie McKenzie (Chinese Taipei) Hsu Chieh-yu (Mexico) Ana Sofía Sánchez (United States) Ingrid Neel
May 11	Bol, Croatia; Clay $10,000; Singles and doubles draws	(Russia) Anastasiya Komardina; 6–3, 6–3	(North Macedonia) Lina Gjorcheska	(Czech Republic) Gabriela Pantůčková (Hungary) Ágnes Bukta	(Italy) Anna Remondina (Switzerland) Karin Kennel (Croatia) Tena Lukas (Slovakia) Natália Vajdová
May 11	Bol, Croatia; Clay $10,000; Singles and doubles draws	(Russia) Anastasiya Komardina (Slovakia) Zuzana Luknárová; 6–2, 0–6, [10–7]	(Slovenia) Pia Čuk (Slovenia) Tamara Zidanšek	(Czech Republic) Gabriela Pantůčková (Hungary) Ágnes Bukta	(Italy) Anna Remondina (Switzerland) Karin Kennel (Croatia) Tena Lukas (Slovakia) Natália Vajdová
May 11	Sharm el-Sheikh, Egypt; Hard $10,000; Singles and doubles draws	(Bulgaria) Julia Terziyska; 6–4, 6–0	(United States) Nadja Gilchrist	(Ukraine) Anastasia Kharchenko (Romania) Elena-Teodora Cadar	(Egypt) Ola Abou Zekry (Italy) Giada Clerici (Belgium) Britt Geukens (Russia) Alina Mikheeva
May 11	Sharm el-Sheikh, Egypt; Hard $10,000; Singles and doubles draws	(Romania) Elena-Teodora Cadar (Ukraine) Anastasia Kharchenko; 6–2, 6–3	(Egypt) Ola Abou Zekry (Bulgaria) Julia Terziyska	(Ukraine) Anastasia Kharchenko (Romania) Elena-Teodora Cadar	(Egypt) Ola Abou Zekry (Italy) Giada Clerici (Belgium) Britt Geukens (Russia) Alina Mikheeva
May 11	Nashik, India; Clay $10,000; Singles and doubles draws	(Chinese Taipei) Hsu Ching-wen; 6–4, 4–6, 7–6^{(7–5)}	(India) Sri Peddi Reddy	(India) Sowjanya Bavisetti (India) Karman Thandi	(India) Snehadevi Reddy (India) Bhuvana Kalva (India) Sai Chamarthi (India) Rishika Sunkara
May 11	Nashik, India; Clay $10,000; Singles and doubles draws	(India) Sowjanya Bavisetti (India) Rishika Sunkara; 7–6^{(7–5)}, 6–2	(India) Riya Bhatia (India) Karman Thandi	(India) Sowjanya Bavisetti (India) Karman Thandi	(India) Snehadevi Reddy (India) Bhuvana Kalva (India) Sai Chamarthi (India) Rishika Sunkara
May 11	Acre, Israel; Hard $10,000; Singles and doubles draws	(Israel) Deniz Khazaniuk; 6–1, 6–3	(Israel) Ofri Lankri	(Belarus) Sadafmoh Tolibova (Hungary) Naomi Totka	(Russia) Daria Lodikova (Israel) Keren Shlomo (United Kingdom) Laura Deigman (United States) Madeleine Kobelt
May 11	Acre, Israel; Hard $10,000; Singles and doubles draws	(Belgium) Hélène Scholsen (Belarus) Sadafmoh Tolibova; 6–1, 6–1	(Uzbekistan) Vlada Ekshibarova (Russia) Daria Lodikova	(Belarus) Sadafmoh Tolibova (Hungary) Naomi Totka	(Russia) Daria Lodikova (Israel) Keren Shlomo (United Kingdom) Laura Deigman (United States) Madeleine Kobelt
May 11	Pula, Italy; Clay $10,000; Singles and doubles draws	(Italy) Martina Trevisan; 6–3, 3–6, 6–1	(Norway) Ulrikke Eikeri	(France) Laëtitia Sarrazin (Bosnia and Herzegovina) Jelena Simić	(Croatia) Jana Fett (Italy) Martina Spigarelli (France) Carla Touly (Switzerland) Tess Sugnaux
May 11	Pula, Italy; Clay $10,000; Singles and doubles draws	(Italy) Beatrice Lombardo (France) Carla Touly; 6–3, 6–0	(Italy) Marcella Cucca (Italy) Verena Meliss	(France) Laëtitia Sarrazin (Bosnia and Herzegovina) Jelena Simić	(Croatia) Jana Fett (Italy) Martina Spigarelli (France) Carla Touly (Switzerland) Tess Sugnaux
May 11	Zielona Góra, Poland; Clay $10,000; Singles and doubles draws	(Czech Republic) Markéta Vondroušová; 6–3, 6–3	(Russia) Natela Dzalamidze	(Czech Republic) Tereza Malíková (Czech Republic) Miriam Kolodziejová	(Germany) Natalia Siedliska (Poland) Marcelina Podlińska (Georgia (country)) Sofia Kvatsabaia (Serbia) Barbara Bonić
May 11	Zielona Góra, Poland; Clay $10,000; Singles and doubles draws	(Czech Republic) Miriam Kolodziejová (Czech Republic) Markéta Vondroušová; 6–2, 6–2	(Russia) Natela Dzalamidze (Russia) Margarita Lazareva	(Czech Republic) Tereza Malíková (Czech Republic) Miriam Kolodziejová	(Germany) Natalia Siedliska (Poland) Marcelina Podlińska (Georgia (country)) Sofia Kvatsabaia (Serbia) Barbara Bonić
May 11	Monzón, Spain; Hard $10,000; Singles and doubles draws	(Spain) Georgina García Pérez; 6–4, 6–2	(Spain) Cristina Sánchez Quintanar	(Spain) Marta González Encinas (France) Joséphine Boualem	(Republic of Ireland) Amy Bowtell (Spain) Estela Pérez Somarriba (Turkey) Başak Eraydın (Spain) Ainhoa Atucha Gómez
May 11	Monzón, Spain; Hard $10,000; Singles and doubles draws	(Spain) Georgina García Pérez (Spain) Olga Parres Azcoitia; 6–4, 6–2	(Turkey) Başak Eraydın (United Kingdom) Francesca Stephenson	(Spain) Marta González Encinas (France) Joséphine Boualem	(Republic of Ireland) Amy Bowtell (Spain) Estela Pérez Somarriba (Turkey) Başak Eraydın (Spain) Ainhoa Atucha Gómez
May 11	Båstad, Sweden; Clay $10,000; Singles and doubles draws	(Sweden) Kajsa Rinaldo Persson; 6–4, 7–6^{(7–1)}	(Italy) Valeria Prosperi	(Sweden) Cornelia Lister (Bosnia and Herzegovina) Dea Herdželaš	(Sweden) Malin Ulvefeldt (Sweden) Paulina Wulcan (Sweden) Brena Njuki (Norway) Melanie Stokke
May 11	Båstad, Sweden; Clay $10,000; Singles and doubles draws	(Sweden) Cornelia Lister (Norway) Melanie Stokke; 5–7, 6–3, [10–8]	(United States) Veronica Corning (Sweden) Maja Örnberg	(Sweden) Cornelia Lister (Bosnia and Herzegovina) Dea Herdželaš	(Sweden) Malin Ulvefeldt (Sweden) Paulina Wulcan (Sweden) Brena Njuki (Norway) Melanie Stokke
May 11	Antalya, Turkey; Hard $10,000; Singles and doubles draws	(Kyrgyzstan) Ksenia Palkina; 4–6, 7–6^{(8–6)}, 6–2	(Turkey) Melis Sezer	(United Kingdom) Anna Brogan (Chinese Taipei) Chien Pei-ju	(Bulgaria) Ani Vangelova (Romania) Nicoleta Dascălu (Algeria) Amira Benaissa (Russia) Olga Puchkova
May 11	Antalya, Turkey; Hard $10,000; Singles and doubles draws	(Japan) Rio Kitagawa (Germany) Alina Wessel; 6–2, 6–1	(Chinese Taipei) Chien Pei-ju (Japan) Aki Yamasoto	(United Kingdom) Anna Brogan (Chinese Taipei) Chien Pei-ju	(Bulgaria) Ani Vangelova (Romania) Nicoleta Dascălu (Algeria) Amira Benaissa (Russia) Olga Puchkova
May 18	ITF Women's Circuit – Wuhan; Wuhan, China; Hard $50,000; Singles – Doubles	(China) Zhang Yuxuan; 6–4, 6–0	(China) Liu Chang	(China) Lu Jingjing (Hong Kong) Zhang Ling	(United States) Alexa Guarachi (Russia) Anastasia Pivovarova (Uzbekistan) Sabina Sharipova (Chinese Taipei) Chang Kai-chen
May 18	ITF Women's Circuit – Wuhan; Wuhan, China; Hard $50,000; Singles – Doubles	(Chinese Taipei) Chang Kai-chen (China) Han Xinyun; 6–0, 6–3	(China) Liu Chang (China) Lu Jiajing	(China) Lu Jingjing (Hong Kong) Zhang Ling	(United States) Alexa Guarachi (Russia) Anastasia Pivovarova (Uzbekistan) Sabina Sharipova (Chinese Taipei) Chang Kai-chen
May 18	Lecoq Seoul Open; Seoul, South Korea; Hard $50,000; Singles – Doubles	(Japan) Riko Sawayanagi; 6–4, 6–4	(South Korea) Jang Su-jeong	(Belgium) An-Sophie Mestach (Thailand) Varatchaya Wongteanchai	(Slovenia) Dalila Jakupović (Japan) Naomi Osaka (South Korea) Han Na-lae (United States) Kristie Ahn
May 18	Lecoq Seoul Open; Seoul, South Korea; Hard $50,000; Singles – Doubles	(Chinese Taipei) Chan Chin-wei (Chinese Taipei) Lee Ya-hsuan; 6–2, 6–1	(South Korea) Hong Seung-yeon (South Korea) Kang Seo-kyung	(Belgium) An-Sophie Mestach (Thailand) Varatchaya Wongteanchai	(Slovenia) Dalila Jakupović (Japan) Naomi Osaka (South Korea) Han Na-lae (United States) Kristie Ahn
May 18	Caserta, Italy; Clay $25,000; Singles and doubles draws	(Russia) Darya Kasatkina; 7–6^{(7–4)}, 6–1	(Turkey) İpek Soylu	(Hungary) Réka-Luca Jani (Bulgaria) Isabella Shinikova	(Luxembourg) Mandy Minella (Georgia (country)) Ekaterine Gorgodze (Croatia) Adrijana Lekaj (Romania) Alexandra Cadanțu
May 18	Caserta, Italy; Clay $25,000; Singles and doubles draws	(Georgia (country)) Ekaterine Gorgodze (Georgia (country)) Sofia Shapatava; 6–0, 7–6^{(8–6)}	(Italy) Alice Matteucci (Turkey) İpek Soylu	(Hungary) Réka-Luca Jani (Bulgaria) Isabella Shinikova	(Luxembourg) Mandy Minella (Georgia (country)) Ekaterine Gorgodze (Croatia) Adrijana Lekaj (Romania) Alexandra Cadanțu
May 18	Karuizawa, Japan; Grass $25,000; Singles and doubles draws	(Japan) Miyu Kato; 7–6^{(7–5)}, 5–7, 6–1	(Japan) Makoto Ninomiya	(Japan) Akari Inoue (Japan) Miki Miyamura	(Japan) Mana Ayukawa (Japan) Yuuki Tanaka (Australia) Abbie Myers (Japan) Yukina Saigo
May 18	Karuizawa, Japan; Grass $25,000; Singles and doubles draws	(Japan) Rika Fujiwara (Japan) Miyu Kato; 6–2, 6–0	(Japan) Mana Ayukawa (Japan) Makoto Ninomiya	(Japan) Akari Inoue (Japan) Miki Miyamura	(Japan) Mana Ayukawa (Japan) Yuuki Tanaka (Australia) Abbie Myers (Japan) Yukina Saigo
May 18	Bol, Croatia; Clay $10,000; Singles and doubles draws	(Russia) Anastasiya Komardina; 6–3, 1–6, 6–3	(North Macedonia) Lina Gjorcheska	(Slovenia) Tamara Zidanšek (Croatia) Tena Lukas	(Croatia) Martina Bašić (Slovakia) Natália Vajdová (Slovenia) Pia Čuk (Argentina) Julieta Estable
May 18	Bol, Croatia; Clay $10,000; Singles and doubles draws	(North Macedonia) Lina Gjorcheska (Germany) Christina Shakovets; 4–6, 6–2, [10–2]	(Switzerland) Karin Kennel (Croatia) Iva Primorac	(Slovenia) Tamara Zidanšek (Croatia) Tena Lukas	(Croatia) Martina Bašić (Slovakia) Natália Vajdová (Slovenia) Pia Čuk (Argentina) Julieta Estable
May 18	Sharm el-Sheikh, Egypt; Hard $10,000; Singles and doubles draws	(Bulgaria) Julia Terziyska; 4–1, ret.	(United Kingdom) Naomi Cavaday	(Sweden) Jacqueline Cabaj Awad (Romania) Elena-Teodora Cadar	(United Kingdom) Laura Deigman (United Kingdom) Francesca Stephenson (Germany) Ina Kaufinger (Belgium) Britt Geukens
May 18	Sharm el-Sheikh, Egypt; Hard $10,000; Singles and doubles draws	(Romania) Elena-Teodora Cadar (Belgium) Britt Geukens; 7–6^{(7–5)}, 1–0, ret.	(United Kingdom) Naomi Cavaday (United Kingdom) Francesca Stephenson	(Sweden) Jacqueline Cabaj Awad (Romania) Elena-Teodora Cadar	(United Kingdom) Laura Deigman (United Kingdom) Francesca Stephenson (Germany) Ina Kaufinger (Belgium) Britt Geukens
May 18	Bhopal, India; Hard $10,000; Singles and doubles draws	(India) Sharmada Balu; 6–2, 6–3	(India) Sowjanya Bavisetti	(India) Snehadevi Reddy (India) Sri Peddi Reddy	(Chinese Taipei) Hsu Ching-wen (India) Bhuvana Kalva (India) Sharon Sanchana Paul (India) Dhruthi Tatachar Venugopal
May 18	Bhopal, India; Hard $10,000; Singles and doubles draws	(India) Snehadevi Reddy (India) Dhruthi Tatachar Venugopal; 0–6, 7–6^{(7–1)}, [10–3]	(India) Sharmada Balu (Chinese Taipei) Hsu Ching-wen	(India) Snehadevi Reddy (India) Sri Peddi Reddy	(Chinese Taipei) Hsu Ching-wen (India) Bhuvana Kalva (India) Sharon Sanchana Paul (India) Dhruthi Tatachar Venugopal
May 18	Tarakan, Indonesia; Hard (indoor) $10,000; Singles and doubles draws	(Chinese Taipei) Lee Pei-chi; 6–0, 6–1	(Indonesia) Rifanty Kahfiani	(China) Lu Jiaxi (India) Ashmitha Easwaramurthi	(Indonesia) Vita Taher (Finland) Piia Suomalainen (Japan) Hirono Watanabe (Serbia) Tamara Čurović
May 18	Tarakan, Indonesia; Hard (indoor) $10,000; Singles and doubles draws	(Chinese Taipei) Lee Pei-chi (Japan) Hirono Watanabe; 5–7, 6–1, [10–6]	(India) Ashmitha Easwaramurthi (China) Yu Yuanyi	(China) Lu Jiaxi (India) Ashmitha Easwaramurthi	(Indonesia) Vita Taher (Finland) Piia Suomalainen (Japan) Hirono Watanabe (Serbia) Tamara Čurović
May 18	Netanya, Israel; Hard $10,000; Singles and doubles draws	(Israel) Deniz Khazaniuk; 6–4, 6–1	(Israel) Ofri Lankri	(Israel) Keren Shlomo (France) Amandine Cazeaux	(Ukraine) Anna Bogoslavets (Uzbekistan) Vlada Ekshibarova (Israel) Saray Sterenbach (Hungary) Naomi Totka
May 18	Netanya, Israel; Hard $10,000; Singles and doubles draws	(Israel) Ofri Lankri (Israel) Alona Pushkarevsky; 6–3, 6–3	(Uzbekistan) Vlada Ekshibarova (Israel) Deniz Khazaniuk	(Israel) Keren Shlomo (France) Amandine Cazeaux	(Ukraine) Anna Bogoslavets (Uzbekistan) Vlada Ekshibarova (Israel) Saray Sterenbach (Hungary) Naomi Totka
May 18	Szczawno-Zdrój, Poland; Clay $10,000; Singles and doubles draws	(Czech Republic) Martina Borecká; 1–0, ret.	(Czech Republic) Jesika Malečková	(Philippines) Katharina Lehnert (Czech Republic) Veronika Vlkovská	(Poland) Paulina Czarnik (Poland) Katarzyna Kawa (Japan) Natsumi Chimura (Poland) Magdalena Fręch
May 18	Szczawno-Zdrój, Poland; Clay $10,000; Singles and doubles draws	(Czech Republic) Martina Borecká (Czech Republic) Jesika Malečková; 6–1, 2–6, [10–5]	(Czech Republic) Veronika Kolářová (Czech Republic) Petra Rohanová	(Philippines) Katharina Lehnert (Czech Republic) Veronika Vlkovská	(Poland) Paulina Czarnik (Poland) Katarzyna Kawa (Japan) Natsumi Chimura (Poland) Magdalena Fręch
May 18	Sibiu, Romania; Clay $10,000; Singles and doubles draws	(Hungary) Anna Bondár; 6–1, 4–6, 6–1	(Romania) Mădălina Gojnea	(Romania) Simona Ionescu (Romania) Nicoleta Dascălu	(Hungary) Fanny Stollár (Slovakia) Viktória Kužmová (Romania) Georgia Crăciun (Romania) Irina Fetecău
May 18	Sibiu, Romania; Clay $10,000; Singles and doubles draws	(Hungary) Anna Bondár (Romania) Ana Bianca Mihăilă; 6–4, 6–4	(Romania) Mihaela Ghioca (Romania) Iuliana Oante	(Romania) Simona Ionescu (Romania) Nicoleta Dascălu	(Hungary) Fanny Stollár (Slovakia) Viktória Kužmová (Romania) Georgia Crăciun (Romania) Irina Fetecău
May 18	Velenje, Slovenia; Clay $10,000; Singles and doubles draws	(Italy) Stefania Rubini; 4–6, 7–5, 6–2	(Slovenia) Eva Zagorac	(Czech Republic) Kateřina Kramperová (Croatia) Silvia Njirić	(Greece) Despina Papamichail (Germany) Anna Klasen (Slovenia) Natalija Šipek (Serbia) Doroteja Erić
May 18	Velenje, Slovenia; Clay $10,000; Singles and doubles draws	(Slovenia) Nina Potočnik (Slovenia) Natalija Šipek; 4–6, 6–3, [10–4]	(Germany) Anna Klasen (Austria) Yvonne Neuwirth	(Czech Republic) Kateřina Kramperová (Croatia) Silvia Njirić	(Greece) Despina Papamichail (Germany) Anna Klasen (Slovenia) Natalija Šipek (Serbia) Doroteja Erić
May 18	Bangkok, Thailand; Hard $10,000; Singles and doubles draws	(Thailand) Nicha Lertpitaksinchai; 7–6^{(7–4)}, 6–2	(Thailand) Peangtarn Plipuech	(Thailand) Nungnadda Wannasuk (Thailand) Bunyawi Thamchaiwat	(South Korea) Kim Dabin (Australia) Nicole Collie (Australia) Zoe Hives (Japan) Kanami Tsuji
May 18	Bangkok, Thailand; Hard $10,000; Singles and doubles draws	(Australia) Nicole Collie (Australia) Deeon Mladin; 6–4, 6–3	(Thailand) Tamachan Momkoonthod (Thailand) Plobrung Plipuech	(Thailand) Nungnadda Wannasuk (Thailand) Bunyawi Thamchaiwat	(South Korea) Kim Dabin (Australia) Nicole Collie (Australia) Zoe Hives (Japan) Kanami Tsuji
May 18	Antalya, Turkey; Hard $10,000; Singles and doubles draws	(Bolivia) María Fernanda Álvarez Terán; 6–3, 6–4	(United Kingdom) Anna Brogan	(Romania) Irina Mara Bara (France) Alice Bacquié	(Italy) Francesca Palmigiano (Germany) Tayisiya Morderger (Turkey) Ayla Aksu (Turkey) Melis Sezer
May 18	Antalya, Turkey; Hard $10,000; Singles and doubles draws	(Turkey) Ayla Aksu (Turkey) Melis Sezer; 7–5, 6–2	(Venezuela) Mariaryeni Gutiérrez (Spain) María Martínez Martínez	(Romania) Irina Mara Bara (France) Alice Bacquié	(Italy) Francesca Palmigiano (Germany) Tayisiya Morderger (Turkey) Ayla Aksu (Turkey) Melis Sezer
May 25	ITF Women's Circuit – Xuzhou; Xuzhou, China; Hard $50,000; Singles – Doubles	(Thailand) Luksika Kumkhum; 1–6, 7–5, 6–1	(Chinese Taipei) Chang Kai-chen	(India) Ankita Raina (China) Han Xinyun	(China) Gao Xinyu (China) Cao Siqi (China) Gai Ao (China) Lu Jingjing
May 25	ITF Women's Circuit – Xuzhou; Xuzhou, China; Hard $50,000; Singles – Doubles	(Chinese Taipei) Chang Kai-chen (China) Han Xinyun; 6–3, 6–2	(China) Cao Siqi (China) Zhou Mingjun	(India) Ankita Raina (China) Han Xinyun	(China) Gao Xinyu (China) Cao Siqi (China) Gai Ao (China) Lu Jingjing
May 25	Balikpapan, Indonesia; Hard $25,000; Singles and doubles draws	(China) Lu Jiajing; 6–4, 6–4	(Japan) Miyu Kato	(Japan) Akiko Omae (Japan) Ayaka Okuno	(Japan) Hirono Watanabe (Thailand) Nudnida Luangnam (Japan) Erika Sema (United Kingdom) Harriet Dart
May 25	Balikpapan, Indonesia; Hard $25,000; Singles and doubles draws	(United Kingdom) Harriet Dart (India) Prarthana Thombare; 6–4, 4–6, [18–16]	(Thailand) Nicha Lertpitaksinchai (Thailand) Nudnida Luangnam	(Japan) Akiko Omae (Japan) Ayaka Okuno	(Japan) Hirono Watanabe (Thailand) Nudnida Luangnam (Japan) Erika Sema (United Kingdom) Harriet Dart
May 25	Grado, Italy; Clay $25,000; Singles and doubles draws	(Poland) Katarzyna Piter; 6–3, 6–0	(Slovakia) Kristína Schmiedlová	(Czech Republic) Tereza Martincová (Germany) Anne Schäfer	(Spain) Olga Sáez Larra (Italy) Martina Caregaro (Georgia (country)) Sofia Shapatava (Switzerland) Viktorija Golubic
May 25	Grado, Italy; Clay $25,000; Singles and doubles draws	(Switzerland) Viktorija Golubic (Brazil) Beatriz Haddad Maia; 6–3, 6–2	(Canada) Sharon Fichman (Poland) Katarzyna Piter	(Czech Republic) Tereza Martincová (Germany) Anne Schäfer	(Spain) Olga Sáez Larra (Italy) Martina Caregaro (Georgia (country)) Sofia Shapatava (Switzerland) Viktorija Golubic
May 25	Moscow, Russia; Clay $25,000; Singles and doubles draws	(Russia) Polina Vinogradova; 6–7^{(7–9)}, 6–3, 6–1	(Germany) Carolin Daniels	(Russia) Karine Sarkisova (Russia) Natela Dzalamidze	(Ukraine) Alyona Sotnikova (Ukraine) Olga Fridman (Russia) Valentyna Ivakhnenko (Poland) Katarzyna Kawa
May 25	Moscow, Russia; Clay $25,000; Singles and doubles draws	(Germany) Carolin Daniels (Ukraine) Alyona Sotnikova; 6–2, 7–6^{(12–10)}	(Ukraine) Olga Ianchuk (Russia) Darya Kasatkina	(Russia) Karine Sarkisova (Russia) Natela Dzalamidze	(Ukraine) Alyona Sotnikova (Ukraine) Olga Fridman (Russia) Valentyna Ivakhnenko (Poland) Katarzyna Kawa
May 25	Infond Open; Maribor, Slovenia; Clay $25,000; Singles and doubles draws	(Greece) Maria Sakkari; 3–6, 6–2, 6–2	(Sweden) Rebecca Peterson	(Croatia) Ema Mikulčić (Serbia) Doroteja Erić	(Italy) Giulia Gatto-Monticone (Russia) Victoria Kan (Czech Republic) Kateřina Vaňková (Georgia (country)) Ekaterine Gorgodze
May 25	Infond Open; Maribor, Slovenia; Clay $25,000; Singles and doubles draws	(Georgia (country)) Ekaterine Gorgodze (Slovenia) Nastja Kolar; 6–2, 6–4	(Czech Republic) Petra Krejsová (Czech Republic) Kateřina Vaňková	(Croatia) Ema Mikulčić (Serbia) Doroteja Erić	(Italy) Giulia Gatto-Monticone (Russia) Victoria Kan (Czech Republic) Kateřina Vaňková (Georgia (country)) Ekaterine Gorgodze
May 25	Changwon, South Korea; Hard $25,000; Singles and doubles draws	(United States) Kristie Ahn; 6–3, 3–2, ret.	(South Korea) Lee Ye-ra	(Japan) Nao Hibino (South Korea) Lee So-ra	(South Korea) Han Na-lae (Chinese Taipei) Lee Ya-hsuan (South Korea) Han Sung-hee (Japan) Mana Ayukawa
May 25	Changwon, South Korea; Hard $25,000; Singles and doubles draws	(South Korea) Han Na-lae (South Korea) Yoo Mi; 6–3, 6–1	(Japan) Mana Ayukawa (Japan) Makoto Ninomiya	(Japan) Nao Hibino (South Korea) Lee So-ra	(South Korea) Han Na-lae (Chinese Taipei) Lee Ya-hsuan (South Korea) Han Sung-hee (Japan) Mana Ayukawa
May 25	Bol, Croatia; Clay $10,000; Singles and doubles draws	(Croatia) Tena Lukas; 6–4, 4–6, 6–3	(Croatia) Nina Alibalić	(Australia) Sally Peers (Argentina) Julieta Estable	(Hungary) Szabina Szlavikovics (Belgium) Eliessa Vanlangendonck (Croatia) Iva Primorac (Germany) Dana Kremer
May 25	Bol, Croatia; Clay $10,000; Singles and doubles draws	(Croatia) Tena Lukas (Croatia) Iva Primorac; 4–6, 6–1, [10–7]	(Brazil) Maria Fernanda Alves (Argentina) Ailen Crespo Azconzábal	(Australia) Sally Peers (Argentina) Julieta Estable	(Hungary) Szabina Szlavikovics (Belgium) Eliessa Vanlangendonck (Croatia) Iva Primorac (Germany) Dana Kremer
May 25	Sharm el-Sheikh, Egypt; Hard $10,000; Singles and doubles draws	(Sweden) Jacqueline Cabaj Awad; 4–6, 6–1, 6–3	(Italy) Alice Matteucci	(Greece) Despina Papamichail (Egypt) Ola Abou Zekry	(Russia) Ksenia Dmitrieva (Greece) Eleni Kordolaimi (Russia) Alina Mikheeva (United Kingdom) Laura Deigman
May 25	Sharm el-Sheikh, Egypt; Hard $10,000; Singles and doubles draws	(Italy) Alice Matteucci (Greece) Despina Papamichail; 6–3, 6–4	(Romania) Elena-Teodora Cadar (Greece) Eleni Kordolaimi	(Greece) Despina Papamichail (Egypt) Ola Abou Zekry	(Russia) Ksenia Dmitrieva (Greece) Eleni Kordolaimi (Russia) Alina Mikheeva (United Kingdom) Laura Deigman
May 25	Galați, Romania; Clay $10,000; Singles and doubles draws	(Hungary) Fanny Stollár; 2–6, 6–4, 7–5	(Romania) Georgia Crăciun	(Romania) Gabriela Talabă (Italy) Anna Remondina	(Romania) Ilona Georgiana Ghioroaie (Romania) Irina Fetecău (France) Caroline Roméo (Moldova) Anastasia Vdovenco
May 25	Galați, Romania; Clay $10,000; Singles and doubles draws	(Moldova) Daniela Ciobanu (Moldova) Alexandra Perper; 6–2, 3–6, [12–10]	(Germany) Charlotte Klasen (Italy) Anna Remondina	(Romania) Gabriela Talabă (Italy) Anna Remondina	(Romania) Ilona Georgiana Ghioroaie (Romania) Irina Fetecău (France) Caroline Roméo (Moldova) Anastasia Vdovenco
May 25	Bangkok, Thailand; Hard $10,000; Singles and doubles draws	(Thailand) Bunyawi Thamchaiwat; 6–7^{(4–7)}, 6–3, ret.	(Thailand) Nungnadda Wannasuk	(Chinese Taipei) Hsu Ching-wen (China) Zhang Yukun	(Australia) Jelena Stojanovic (Thailand) Plobrung Plipuech (Thailand) Tamachan Momkoonthod (Australia) Zoe Hives
May 25	Bangkok, Thailand; Hard $10,000; Singles and doubles draws	(Chinese Taipei) Hsu Ching-wen (Thailand) Nungnadda Wannasuk; 4–6, 7–6^{(7–4)}, [10–3]	(Thailand) Kamonwan Buayam (South Korea) Kim Dabin	(Chinese Taipei) Hsu Ching-wen (China) Zhang Yukun	(Australia) Jelena Stojanovic (Thailand) Plobrung Plipuech (Thailand) Tamachan Momkoonthod (Australia) Zoe Hives
May 25	Antalya, Turkey; Hard $10,000; Singles and doubles draws	(Romania) Irina Maria Bara; 6–7^{(2–7)}, 6–1, 6–0	(Bolivia) María Fernanda Álvarez Terán	(Spain) María Martínez Martínez (Germany) Lisa Matviyenko	(South Africa) Chanel Simmonds (Japan) Seira Shimizu (Italy) Francesca Palmigiano (France) Carla Touly
May 25	Antalya, Turkey; Hard $10,000; Singles and doubles draws	(Italy) Francesca Palmigiano (France) Carla Touly; 6–4, 6–0	(Romania) Irina Maria Bara (Croatia) Tea Faber	(Spain) María Martínez Martínez (Germany) Lisa Matviyenko	(South Africa) Chanel Simmonds (Japan) Seira Shimizu (Italy) Francesca Palmigiano (France) Carla Touly

=== June ===
Week of	Tournament	Winner	Runners-up	Semifinalists	Quarterfinalists
June 1	Open Féminin de Marseille; Marseille, France; Clay $100,000; Singles – Doubles	(Romania) Monica Niculescu; 6–2, 7–5	(France) Pauline Parmentier	(Ukraine) Kateryna Bondarenko (Colombia) Mariana Duque	(France) Chloé Paquet (Slovenia) Polona Hercog (Latvia) Anastasija Sevastova (Czech Republic) Denisa Allertová
June 1	Open Féminin de Marseille; Marseille, France; Clay $100,000; Singles – Doubles	(Argentina) Tatiana Búa (France) Laura Thorpe; 6–3, 3–6, [10–6]	(United States) Nicole Melichar (Ukraine) Maryna Zanevska	(Ukraine) Kateryna Bondarenko (Colombia) Mariana Duque	(France) Chloé Paquet (Slovenia) Polona Hercog (Latvia) Anastasija Sevastova (Czech Republic) Denisa Allertová
June 1	Internazionali Femminili di Brescia; Brescia, Italy; Clay $50,000; Singles – Doubles	(Liechtenstein) Stephanie Vogt; 7–6^{(7–3)}, 6–4	(Venezuela) Andrea Gámiz	(Spain) Sara Sorribes Tormo (Switzerland) Romina Oprandi	(Russia) Vitalia Diatchenko (Italy) Claudia Giovine (Australia) Olivia Rogowska (Slovakia) Kristína Kučová
June 1	Internazionali Femminili di Brescia; Brescia, Italy; Clay $50,000; Singles – Doubles	(Germany) Laura Siegemund (Czech Republic) Renata Voráčová; 6–2, 6–1	(Argentina) María Irigoyen (Liechtenstein) Stephanie Vogt	(Spain) Sara Sorribes Tormo (Switzerland) Romina Oprandi	(Russia) Vitalia Diatchenko (Italy) Claudia Giovine (Australia) Olivia Rogowska (Slovakia) Kristína Kučová
June 1	Aegon Eastbourne Trophy; Eastbourne, United Kingdom; Grass $50,000; Singles – Doubles	(Estonia) Anett Kontaveit; 7–6^{(7–4)}, 7–6^{(7–2)}	(Russia) Alla Kudryavtseva	(Portugal) Michelle Larcher de Brito (United States) Julia Boserup	(China) Wang Qiang (United Kingdom) Tara Moore (France) Océane Dodin (Croatia) Petra Martić
June 1	Aegon Eastbourne Trophy; Eastbourne, United Kingdom; Grass $50,000; Singles – Doubles	(United States) Shelby Rogers (United States) Coco Vandeweghe; 7–5, 7–6^{(7–1)}	(United Kingdom) Jocelyn Rae (United Kingdom) Anna Smith	(Portugal) Michelle Larcher de Brito (United States) Julia Boserup	(China) Wang Qiang (United Kingdom) Tara Moore (France) Océane Dodin (Croatia) Petra Martić
June 1	Andijan, Uzbekistan; Hard $25,000; Singles and doubles draws	(Czech Republic) Barbora Štefková; 7–5, 6–3	(Russia) Veronika Kudermetova	(Bulgaria) Julia Terziyska (Russia) Ksenia Lykina	(Ukraine) Valeriya Strakhova (Russia) Anastasiya Komardina (India) Ankita Raina (Russia) Olga Puchkova
June 1	Andijan, Uzbekistan; Hard $25,000; Singles and doubles draws	(Uzbekistan) Nigina Abduraimova (Japan) Hiroko Kuwata; 4–6, 7–6^{(7–5)}, [11–9]	(Russia) Veronika Kudermetova (Russia) Ksenia Lykina	(Bulgaria) Julia Terziyska (Russia) Ksenia Lykina	(Ukraine) Valeriya Strakhova (Russia) Anastasiya Komardina (India) Ankita Raina (Russia) Olga Puchkova
June 1	Bol, Croatia; Clay $10,000; Singles and doubles draws	(Croatia) Iva Mekovec; 6–3, 6–2	(Germany) Anna Zaja	(Bosnia and Herzegovina) Dea Herdželaš (France) Jade Suvrijn	(Netherlands) Janneke Wikkerink (France) Eléonore Barrère (Croatia) Iva Primorac (Czech Republic) Gabriela Pantůčková
June 1	Bol, Croatia; Clay $10,000; Singles and doubles draws	(Hungary) Rebeka Stolmár (Hungary) Szabina Szlavikovics; 7–6^{(7–5)}, 6–0	(Bosnia and Herzegovina) Dea Herdželaš (Slovakia) Barbara Kötelesová	(Bosnia and Herzegovina) Dea Herdželaš (France) Jade Suvrijn	(Netherlands) Janneke Wikkerink (France) Eléonore Barrère (Croatia) Iva Primorac (Czech Republic) Gabriela Pantůčková
June 1	Sharm el-Sheikh, Egypt; Hard $10,000; Singles and doubles draws	(Egypt) Ola Abou Zekry; 6–1, 1–6, 6–3	(Sweden) Jacqueline Cabaj Awad	(Greece) Despina Papamichail (Italy) Alice Matteucci	(Greece) Eleni Kordolaimi (Spain) Olga Parres Azcoitia (Belgium) Mathilde Devits (Portugal) Inês Murta
June 1	Sharm el-Sheikh, Egypt; Hard $10,000; Singles and doubles draws	(Italy) Alice Matteucci (Greece) Despina Papamichail; 6–1, 6–3	(United Kingdom) Grace Dixon (Finland) Ella Leivo	(Greece) Despina Papamichail (Italy) Alice Matteucci	(Greece) Eleni Kordolaimi (Spain) Olga Parres Azcoitia (Belgium) Mathilde Devits (Portugal) Inês Murta
June 1	Ramat Gan, Israel; Hard $10,000; Singles and doubles draws	(France) Lou Brouleau; 6–3, 2–6, 7–6^{(8–6)}	(Israel) Deniz Khazaniuk	(France) Amandine Cazeaux (Israel) Keren Shlomo	(Israel) Ofri Lankri (Belgium) Hélène Scholsen (Germany) Katharina Hering (Italy) Camilla Rosatello
June 1	Ramat Gan, Israel; Hard $10,000; Singles and doubles draws	(Israel) Valeria Patiuk (Israel) Keren Shlomo; 6–4, 6–2	(Israel) Ofri Lankri (Israel) Alona Pushkarevsky	(France) Amandine Cazeaux (Israel) Keren Shlomo	(Israel) Ofri Lankri (Belgium) Hélène Scholsen (Germany) Katharina Hering (Italy) Camilla Rosatello
June 1	Ariake, Japan; Hard $10,000; Singles and doubles draws	(Japan) Risa Ushijima; 6–3, 6–4	(Serbia) Vojislava Lukić	(Japan) Shiho Akita (Japan) Kanae Hisami	(Japan) Yuka Higuchi (Japan) Mizuno Kijima (Japan) Miki Miyamura (United States) Tori Kinard
June 1	Ariake, Japan; Hard $10,000; Singles and doubles draws	(Japan) Kanae Hisami (Japan) Kotomi Takahata; 6–4, 6–4	(United States) Yuki Chiang (Japan) Nozomi Fujioka	(Japan) Shiho Akita (Japan) Kanae Hisami	(Japan) Yuka Higuchi (Japan) Mizuno Kijima (Japan) Miki Miyamura (United States) Tori Kinard
June 1	Manzanillo, Mexico; Hard $10,000; Singles and doubles draws	(Mexico) Giuliana Olmos; 4–6, 7–6^{(7–5)}, 6–0	(Chile) Fernanda Brito	(Dominican Republic) Francesca Segarelli (Russia) Anastasia Evgenyevna Nefedova	(United States) Amy Zhu (Chile) Bárbara Gatica (Mexico) Daniela Morales Beckmann (Russia) Veronica Miroshnichenko
June 1	Manzanillo, Mexico; Hard $10,000; Singles and doubles draws	(Mexico) Carolina Betancourt (Samoa) Steffi Carruthers; 6–3, 6–3	(United States) Tornado Alicia Black (United States) Dasha Ivanova	(Dominican Republic) Francesca Segarelli (Russia) Anastasia Evgenyevna Nefedova	(United States) Amy Zhu (Chile) Bárbara Gatica (Mexico) Daniela Morales Beckmann (Russia) Veronica Miroshnichenko
June 1	Galați, Romania; Clay $10,000; Singles and doubles draws	(Romania) Diana Buzean; 6–3, 4–6, 6–3	(Romania) Irina Maria Bara	(Romania) Cristina Dinu (Italy) Anna Remondina	(Romania) Andreea Prisăcariu (Moldova) Anastasia Vdovenco (Romania) Cristina Ene (Bulgaria) Dia Evtimova
June 1	Galați, Romania; Clay $10,000; Singles and doubles draws	(Romania) Oana Georgeta Simion (Romania) Gabriela Talabă; 4–6, 7–5, [10–8]	(Moldova) Daniela Ciobanu (Romania) Camelia Hristea	(Romania) Cristina Dinu (Italy) Anna Remondina	(Romania) Andreea Prisăcariu (Moldova) Anastasia Vdovenco (Romania) Cristina Ene (Bulgaria) Dia Evtimova
June 1	Kazan, Russia; Hard $10,000; Singles and doubles draws	(Russia) Daria Mironova; 5–7, 6–0, 7–6^{(7–5)}	(Russia) Anastasia Frolova	(Russia) Ekaterina Yashina (Russia) Angelina Zhuravleva	(Russia) Yana Sizikova (Russia) Ralina Kalimullina (Russia) Valeriya Deminova (Russia) Maria Kononova
June 1	Kazan, Russia; Hard $10,000; Singles and doubles draws	(Russia) Anastasia Frolova (Russia) Yana Sizikova; 6–2, 6–3	(Russia) Aida Kalimullina (Russia) Ekaterina Yashina	(Russia) Ekaterina Yashina (Russia) Angelina Zhuravleva	(Russia) Yana Sizikova (Russia) Ralina Kalimullina (Russia) Valeriya Deminova (Russia) Maria Kononova
June 1	Madrid, Spain; Clay $10,000; Singles and doubles draws	(Spain) Olga Sáez Larra; 6–4, 6–0	(Spain) Estrella Cabeza Candela	(Spain) Cristina Sánchez Quintanar (Australia) Alexandra Nancarrow	(Spain) Rocío de la Torre Sánchez (Spain) Natalia Serrano García (Switzerland) Tess Sugnaux (Brazil) Carolina Alves
June 1	Madrid, Spain; Clay $10,000; Singles and doubles draws	(Spain) Estrella Cabeza Candela (Spain) Cristina Sánchez Quintanar; 4–6, 6–4, [10–7]	(Spain) Sílvia García Jiménez (Spain) Olga Sáez Larra	(Spain) Cristina Sánchez Quintanar (Australia) Alexandra Nancarrow	(Spain) Rocío de la Torre Sánchez (Spain) Natalia Serrano García (Switzerland) Tess Sugnaux (Brazil) Carolina Alves
June 1	Bangkok, Thailand; Hard $10,000; Singles and doubles draws	(Thailand) Kamonwan Buayam; 6–4, 6–3	(Australia) Nicole Collie	(Thailand) Nicha Lertpitaksinchai (Finland) Piia Suomalainen	(Thailand) Tamachan Momkoonthod (Thailand) Plobrung Plipuech (Australia) Lizette Cabrera (Thailand) Patcharin Cheapchandej
June 1	Bangkok, Thailand; Hard $10,000; Singles and doubles draws	(Oman) Fatma Al-Nabhani (Thailand) Nungnadda Wannasuk; 6–3, 7–5	(Thailand) Kamonwan Buayam (South Korea) Kim Dabin	(Thailand) Nicha Lertpitaksinchai (Finland) Piia Suomalainen	(Thailand) Tamachan Momkoonthod (Thailand) Plobrung Plipuech (Australia) Lizette Cabrera (Thailand) Patcharin Cheapchandej
June 1	Adana, Turkey; Hard $10,000; Singles and doubles draws	(Turkey) Ayla Aksu; 3–6, 6–3, 7–6^{(7–3)}	(France) Carla Touly	(Turkey) Melis Sezer (Bosnia and Herzegovina) Anita Husarić	(Bolivia) María Fernanda Álvarez Terán (Turkey) Berfu Cengiz (Norway) Emma Flood (Kyrgyzstan) Ksenia Palkina
June 1	Adana, Turkey; Hard $10,000; Singles and doubles draws	(Turkey) Ayla Aksu (Turkey) Melis Sezer; 6–1, 6–3	(Turkey) Cemre Anıl (Russia) Vasilisa Aponasenko	(Turkey) Melis Sezer (Bosnia and Herzegovina) Anita Husarić	(Bolivia) María Fernanda Álvarez Terán (Turkey) Berfu Cengiz (Norway) Emma Flood (Kyrgyzstan) Ksenia Palkina
June 1	Bethany Beach, United States; Clay $10,000; Singles and doubles draws	(Canada) Sonja Molnar; 6–1, 7–5	(United States) Alexa Graham	(United States) Nicole Frenkel (United States) Jacqueline Cako	(Australia) Ellen Perez (Canada) Petra Januskova (United States) Elizabeth Profit (United States) Alexandra Cercone
June 1	Bethany Beach, United States; Clay $10,000; Singles and doubles draws	(United States) Sophie Chang (United States) Andie Daniell; 6–4, 6–1	(Australia) Ellen Perez (Australia) Belinda Woolcock	(United States) Nicole Frenkel (United States) Jacqueline Cako	(Australia) Ellen Perez (Canada) Petra Januskova (United States) Elizabeth Profit (United States) Alexandra Cercone
June 8	Aegon Surbiton Trophy; Surbiton, United Kingdom; Grass $50,000; Singles – Doubles	(Russia) Vitalia Diatchenko; 7–6^{(7–5)}, 6–0	(Japan) Naomi Osaka	(United Kingdom) Naomi Broady (Estonia) Anett Kontaveit	(Austria) Tamira Paszek (United Kingdom) Amanda Carreras (Spain) Georgina García Pérez (Chinese Taipei) Hsieh Su-wei
June 8	Aegon Surbiton Trophy; Surbiton, United Kingdom; Grass $50,000; Singles – Doubles	(Ukraine) Lyudmyla Kichenok (Switzerland) Xenia Knoll; 7–6^{(8–6)}, 6–3	(United Kingdom) Tara Moore (United Kingdom) Nicola Slater	(United Kingdom) Naomi Broady (Estonia) Anett Kontaveit	(Austria) Tamira Paszek (United Kingdom) Amanda Carreras (Spain) Georgina García Pérez (Chinese Taipei) Hsieh Su-wei
June 8	Minsk, Belarus; Clay $25,000; Singles and doubles draws	(Russia) Darya Kasatkina; 4–3, ret.	(Ukraine) Ganna Poznikhirenko	(Belarus) Lidziya Marozava (Russia) Anastasia Pivovarova	(Belarus) Aryna Sabalenka (Belarus) Sviatlana Pirazhenka (Russia) Irina Khromacheva (Serbia) Jovana Jakšić
June 8	Minsk, Belarus; Clay $25,000; Singles and doubles draws	(Russia) Valentyna Ivakhnenko (Russia) Polina Monova; 4–6, 6–0, [12–10]	(Ukraine) Olga Ianchuk (Russia) Darya Kasatkina	(Belarus) Lidziya Marozava (Russia) Anastasia Pivovarova	(Belarus) Aryna Sabalenka (Belarus) Sviatlana Pirazhenka (Russia) Irina Khromacheva (Serbia) Jovana Jakšić
June 8	Essen, Germany; Clay $25,000; Singles and doubles draws	(France) Pauline Parmentier; 3–6, 7–6^{(7–4)}, 6–3	(Switzerland) Viktorija Golubic	(Czech Republic) Kateřina Vaňková (Czech Republic) Martina Borecká	(United States) Bernarda Pera (France) Alizé Lim (Sweden) Susanne Celik (Russia) Ekaterina Alexandrova
June 8	Essen, Germany; Clay $25,000; Singles and doubles draws	(Germany) Nicola Geuer (Switzerland) Viktorija Golubic; 6–3, 6–3	(Germany) Carolin Daniels (Germany) Antonia Lottner	(Czech Republic) Kateřina Vaňková (Czech Republic) Martina Borecká	(United States) Bernarda Pera (France) Alizé Lim (Sweden) Susanne Celik (Russia) Ekaterina Alexandrova
June 8	Padua, Italy; Clay $25,000; Singles and doubles draws	(Argentina) Paula Ormaechea; 6–3, 6–4	(Hungary) Réka-Luca Jani	(Switzerland) Jil Teichmann (Brazil) Gabriela Cé	(Slovakia) Petra Uberalová (United States) Allie Kiick (Mexico) Marcela Zacarías (Australia) Olivia Rogowska
June 8	Padua, Italy; Clay $25,000; Singles and doubles draws	(Argentina) María Irigoyen (Czech Republic) Barbora Krejčíková; 6–4, 6–2	(Hungary) Réka-Luca Jani (Argentina) Paula Ormaechea	(Switzerland) Jil Teichmann (Brazil) Gabriela Cé	(Slovakia) Petra Uberalová (United States) Allie Kiick (Mexico) Marcela Zacarías (Australia) Olivia Rogowska
June 8	Kashiwa, Japan; Hard $25,000; Singles and doubles draws	(Japan) Erika Sema; 6–4, 6–4	(Japan) Riko Sawayanagi	(Chinese Taipei) Hsu Ching-wen (Japan) Miyabi Inoue	(Japan) Kyōka Okamura (Japan) Akiko Omae (Japan) Ayaka Okuno (Japan) Mai Minokoshi
June 8	Kashiwa, Japan; Hard $25,000; Singles and doubles draws	(Japan) Miyu Kato (Japan) Akiko Omae; 6–2, 5–7, [10–8]	(Japan) Mana Ayukawa (Japan) Makoto Ninomiya	(Chinese Taipei) Hsu Ching-wen (Japan) Miyabi Inoue	(Japan) Kyōka Okamura (Japan) Akiko Omae (Japan) Ayaka Okuno (Japan) Mai Minokoshi
June 8	Galați, Romania; Clay $25,000; Singles and doubles draws	(Romania) Alexandra Cadanțu; 6–4, 6–7^{(2–7)}, 6–3	(Romania) Cristina Dinu	(Italy) Giulia Gatto-Monticone (North Macedonia) Lina Gjorcheska	(Romania) Patricia Maria Țig (Germany) Anne Schäfer (Austria) Patricia Mayr-Achleitner (Romania) Irina Maria Bara
June 8	Galați, Romania; Clay $25,000; Singles and doubles draws	(Romania) Cristina Dinu (North Macedonia) Lina Gjorcheska; 6–4, 6–2	(Romania) Irina Maria Bara (Romania) Diana Buzean	(Italy) Giulia Gatto-Monticone (North Macedonia) Lina Gjorcheska	(Romania) Patricia Maria Țig (Germany) Anne Schäfer (Austria) Patricia Mayr-Achleitner (Romania) Irina Maria Bara
June 8	Goyang, South Korea; Hard $25,000; Singles and doubles draws	(South Korea) Lee So-ra; 6–4, 3–6, 6–4	(Japan) Risa Ozaki	(Chinese Taipei) Chang Kai-chen (South Korea) Choi Ji-hee	(United States) Kristie Ahn (China) Xun Fangying (South Korea) Han Na-lae (South Korea) Hong Hyun-hui
June 8	Goyang, South Korea; Hard $25,000; Singles and doubles draws	(South Korea) Han Na-lae (South Korea) Yoo Mi; 6–1, 7–5	(China) Liu Chang (China) Lu Jiajing	(Chinese Taipei) Chang Kai-chen (South Korea) Choi Ji-hee	(United States) Kristie Ahn (China) Xun Fangying (South Korea) Han Na-lae (South Korea) Hong Hyun-hui
June 8	Namangan, Uzbekistan; Hard $25,000; Singles and doubles draws	(Uzbekistan) Nigina Abduraimova; 7–6^{(7–3)}, 6–2	(Russia) Anastasiya Komardina	(Uzbekistan) Sabina Sharipova (Ukraine) Nadiia Kichenok	(Japan) Hiroko Kuwata (Bulgaria) Julia Terziyska (Uzbekistan) Akgul Amanmuradova (Russia) Anna Morgina
June 8	Namangan, Uzbekistan; Hard $25,000; Singles and doubles draws	(Russia) Anastasiya Komardina (Bulgaria) Julia Terziyska; 7–6^{(7–2)}, 7–5	(Russia) Veronika Kudermetova (Russia) Ksenia Lykina	(Uzbekistan) Sabina Sharipova (Ukraine) Nadiia Kichenok	(Japan) Hiroko Kuwata (Bulgaria) Julia Terziyska (Uzbekistan) Akgul Amanmuradova (Russia) Anna Morgina
June 8	Banja Luka, Bosnia and Herzegovina; Clay $10,000; Singles and doubles draws	(Slovenia) Tamara Zidanšek; 6–4, 2–6, 7–5	(Serbia) Marina Kačar	(Slovenia) Nina Potočnik (Germany) Natalie Pröse	(Bulgaria) Viktoriya Tomova (Bosnia and Herzegovina) Jasmina Tinjić (Bosnia and Herzegovina) Anita Husarić (Serbia) Bojana Marinković
June 8	Banja Luka, Bosnia and Herzegovina; Clay $10,000; Singles and doubles draws	(Bosnia and Herzegovina) Anita Husarić (France) Laëtitia Sarrazin; 6–2, 6–0	(Serbia) Nikolina Jović (Bosnia and Herzegovina) Jasmina Tinjić	(Slovenia) Nina Potočnik (Germany) Natalie Pröse	(Bulgaria) Viktoriya Tomova (Bosnia and Herzegovina) Jasmina Tinjić (Bosnia and Herzegovina) Anita Husarić (Serbia) Bojana Marinković
June 8	Anning, China; Clay $10,000; Singles and doubles draws	(China) Gao Xinyu; 6–0, 6–4	(China) Zhao Di	(China) You Xiaodi (China) Sun Xuliu	(India) Sowjanya Bavisetti (China) Kang Jiaqi (China) Mu Shouna (China) Zhang Yukun
June 8	Anning, China; Clay $10,000; Singles and doubles draws	(India) Sowjanya Bavisetti (China) Zhu Aiwen; 7–6^{(10–8)}, 0–6, [10–7]	(China) Gai Ao (China) Sheng Yuqi	(China) You Xiaodi (China) Sun Xuliu	(India) Sowjanya Bavisetti (China) Kang Jiaqi (China) Mu Shouna (China) Zhang Yukun
June 8	Bol, Croatia; Clay $10,000; Singles and doubles draws	(Czech Republic) Gabriela Pantůčková; 6–3, 6–2	(Australia) Sally Peers	(Germany) Natalia Siedliska (Hungary) Ágnes Bukta	(France) Marine Partaud (Ukraine) Anna Shkudun (Bosnia and Herzegovina) Dea Herdželaš (Netherlands) Janneke Wikkerink
June 8	Bol, Croatia; Clay $10,000; Singles and doubles draws	(Hungary) Ágnes Bukta (Russia) Eugeniya Pashkova; Walkover	(Netherlands) Liv Geurts (Netherlands) Janneke Wikkerink	(Germany) Natalia Siedliska (Hungary) Ágnes Bukta	(France) Marine Partaud (Ukraine) Anna Shkudun (Bosnia and Herzegovina) Dea Herdželaš (Netherlands) Janneke Wikkerink
June 8	Sharm el-Sheikh, Egypt; Hard $10,000; Singles and doubles draws	(Italy) Alice Matteucci; 6–4, 6–2	(Australia) Sara Tomic	(Poland) Zuzanna Maciejewska (India) Rishika Sunkara	(Portugal) Inês Murta (Czech Republic) Martina Přádová (Romania) Cristina Adamescu (Republic of Ireland) Jenny Claffey
June 8	Sharm el-Sheikh, Egypt; Hard $10,000; Singles and doubles draws	(Spain) Olga Parres Azcoitia (India) Prarthana Thombare; 6–4, 6–2	(Republic of Ireland) Jenny Claffey (Portugal) Inês Murta	(Poland) Zuzanna Maciejewska (India) Rishika Sunkara	(Portugal) Inês Murta (Czech Republic) Martina Přádová (Romania) Cristina Adamescu (Republic of Ireland) Jenny Claffey
June 8	Ramat Gan, Israel; Hard $10,000; Singles and doubles draws	(Israel) Deniz Khazaniuk; 7–5, 6–0	(Israel) Ofri Lankri	(Israel) Alona Pushkarevsky (Belgium) Hélène Scholsen	(Italy) Camilla Rosatello (Ukraine) Veronika Stotyka (Switzerland) Leonie Küng (France) Lou Brouleau
June 8	Ramat Gan, Israel; Hard $10,000; Singles and doubles draws	(Israel) Ofri Lankri (Israel) Alona Pushkarevsky; 6–3, 6–4	(Israel) Valeria Patiuk (Israel) Keren Shlomo	(Israel) Alona Pushkarevsky (Belgium) Hélène Scholsen	(Italy) Camilla Rosatello (Ukraine) Veronika Stotyka (Switzerland) Leonie Küng (France) Lou Brouleau
June 8	Antananarivo, Madagascar; Clay $10,000; Singles and doubles draws	(Hungary) Lilla Barzó; 7–5, 6–2	(United States) Jaeda Daniel	(Germany) Jasmin Jebawy (South Africa) Madrie Le Roux	(United States) Mimi Fotopoulos (France) Fiona Codino (India) Simran Kaur Sethi (Brazil) Karina Venditti
June 8	Antananarivo, Madagascar; Clay $10,000; Singles and doubles draws	(Madagascar) Sandra Andriamarosoa (Madagascar) Zarah Razafimahatratra; 6–3, 6–2	(South Africa) Madrie Le Roux (Namibia) Liniques Theron	(Germany) Jasmin Jebawy (South Africa) Madrie Le Roux	(United States) Mimi Fotopoulos (France) Fiona Codino (India) Simran Kaur Sethi (Brazil) Karina Venditti
June 8	Manzanillo, Mexico; Hard $10,000; Singles and doubles draws	(Mexico) Giuliana Olmos; 6–1, 6–2	(Italy) Gaia Sanesi	(Chile) Fernanda Brito (Paraguay) Camila Giangreco Campiz	(United States) Dasha Ivanova (Samoa) Steffi Carruthers (Russia) Veronica Miroshnichenko (Mexico) Nazari Urbina
June 8	Manzanillo, Mexico; Hard $10,000; Singles and doubles draws	(Mexico) Camila Fuentes (Dominican Republic) Francesca Segarelli; 2–6, 6–4, [10–5]	(Mexico) Constanza Gorches (Mexico) Giuliana Olmos	(Chile) Fernanda Brito (Paraguay) Camila Giangreco Campiz	(United States) Dasha Ivanova (Samoa) Steffi Carruthers (Russia) Veronica Miroshnichenko (Mexico) Nazari Urbina
June 8	Madrid, Spain; Clay $10,000; Singles and doubles draws	(Spain) Aliona Bolsova Zadoinov; 7–5, 3–6, 6–4	(Spain) Lucía Cervera Vázquez	(Spain) Estrella Cabeza Candela (Spain) Rocío de la Torre Sánchez	(Switzerland) Tess Sugnaux (Belgium) Elyne Boeykens (Spain) Marta Sexmilo Pascual (Spain) Cristina Bucșa
June 8	Madrid, Spain; Clay $10,000; Singles and doubles draws	(Belgium) Elyne Boeykens (Belgium) Steffi Distelmans; 6–3, 7–6^{(7–4)}	(Spain) Aliona Bolsova Zadoinov (Spain) Lucía Cervera Vázquez	(Spain) Estrella Cabeza Candela (Spain) Rocío de la Torre Sánchez	(Switzerland) Tess Sugnaux (Belgium) Elyne Boeykens (Spain) Marta Sexmilo Pascual (Spain) Cristina Bucșa
June 8	Adana, Turkey; Clay $10,000; Singles and doubles draws	(Switzerland) Lisa Sabino; 6–2, 6–1	(Slovakia) Lenka Wienerová	(France) Margot Yerolymos (Turkey) Berfu Cengiz	(Turkey) Ayla Aksu (Sweden) Anette Munozova (United Kingdom) Mirabelle Njoze (Bulgaria) Julia Stamatova
June 8	Adana, Turkey; Clay $10,000; Singles and doubles draws	(Turkey) Ayla Aksu (Turkey) Melis Sezer; 6–7^{(5–7)}, 6–4, [10–3]	(Norway) Emma Flood (Sweden) Anette Munozova	(France) Margot Yerolymos (Turkey) Berfu Cengiz	(Turkey) Ayla Aksu (Sweden) Anette Munozova (United Kingdom) Mirabelle Njoze (Bulgaria) Julia Stamatova
June 8	Charlotte, United States; Clay $10,000; Singles and doubles draws	(United States) Caroline Price; 6–2, 3–6, 6–3	(United States) Lauren Herring	(United States) Kourtney Keegan (United States) Alexandra Mueller	(United States) Kayla Day (Argentina) Carla Lucero (Mexico) Renata Zarazúa (United States) Sophie Chang
June 8	Charlotte, United States; Clay $10,000; Singles and doubles draws	(Brazil) Maria Fernanda Alves (Mexico) Renata Zarazúa; 6–4, 6–7^{(6–8)}, [10–8]	(United States) Lauren Herring (Australia) Ellen Perez	(United States) Kourtney Keegan (United States) Alexandra Mueller	(United States) Kayla Day (Argentina) Carla Lucero (Mexico) Renata Zarazúa (United States) Sophie Chang
June 15	Open Montpellier Méditerranée Métropole Hérault; Montpellier, France; Clay $50,000+H; Singles – Doubles	(Spain) Lourdes Domínguez Lino; 6–4, 6–3	(Spain) Sílvia Soler Espinosa	(Netherlands) Richèl Hogenkamp (Germany) Laura Siegemund	(Netherlands) Kiki Bertens (France) Constance Sibille (France) Pauline Parmentier (Russia) Natalia Vikhlyantseva
June 15	Open Montpellier Méditerranée Métropole Hérault; Montpellier, France; Clay $50,000+H; Singles – Doubles	(Argentina) María Irigoyen (Czech Republic) Barbora Krejčíková; 6–4, 6–2	(Germany) Laura Siegemund (Czech Republic) Renata Voráčová	(Netherlands) Richèl Hogenkamp (Germany) Laura Siegemund	(Netherlands) Kiki Bertens (France) Constance Sibille (France) Pauline Parmentier (Russia) Natalia Vikhlyantseva
June 15	Aegon Ilkley Trophy; Ilkley, United Kingdom; Grass $50,000; Singles – Doubles	(Germany) Anna-Lena Friedsam; 5–7, 6–3, 6–1	(Poland) Magda Linette	(Estonia) Anett Kontaveit (Czech Republic) Denisa Allertová	(Germany) Annika Beck (China) Wang Yafan (China) Wang Qiang (Austria) Tamira Paszek
June 15	Aegon Ilkley Trophy; Ilkley, United Kingdom; Grass $50,000; Singles – Doubles	(Romania) Raluca Olaru (China) Xu Yifan; 6–3, 6–4	(Belgium) An-Sophie Mestach (Netherlands) Demi Schuurs	(Estonia) Anett Kontaveit (Czech Republic) Denisa Allertová	(Germany) Annika Beck (China) Wang Yafan (China) Wang Qiang (Austria) Tamira Paszek
June 15	Minsk, Belarus; Clay $25,000; Singles and doubles draws	(Russia) Darya Kasatkina; 6–1, 6–1	(Belarus) Iryna Shymanovich	(Greece) Maria Sakkari (Serbia) Jovana Jakšić	(Russia) Anastasia Pivovarova (Ukraine) Ganna Poznikhirenko (Russia) Karine Sarkisova (Latvia) Anastasija Sevastova
June 15	Minsk, Belarus; Clay $25,000; Singles and doubles draws	(Russia) Valentyna Ivakhnenko (Russia) Irina Khromacheva; 6–3, 6–0	(Turkey) Pemra Özgen (Ukraine) Anastasiya Vasylyeva	(Greece) Maria Sakkari (Serbia) Jovana Jakšić	(Russia) Anastasia Pivovarova (Ukraine) Ganna Poznikhirenko (Russia) Karine Sarkisova (Latvia) Anastasija Sevastova
June 15	Incheon, South Korea; Hard $25,000; Singles and doubles draws	(Japan) Risa Ozaki; 5–7, 7–6^{(7–4)}, 6–3	(China) Liu Chang	(Chinese Taipei) Chang Kai-chen (China) Han Xinyun	(Chinese Taipei) Lee Ya-hsuan (China) Lu Jiajing (Thailand) Nudnida Luangnam (Japan) Kyōka Okamura
June 15	Incheon, South Korea; Hard $25,000; Singles and doubles draws	(Japan) Miyu Kato (Japan) Kotomi Takahata; 4–6, 6–3, [10–7]	(South Korea) Choi Ji-hee (South Korea) Kim Na-ri	(Chinese Taipei) Chang Kai-chen (China) Han Xinyun	(Chinese Taipei) Lee Ya-hsuan (China) Lu Jiajing (Thailand) Nudnida Luangnam (Japan) Kyōka Okamura
June 15	Ystad, Sweden; Clay $25,000; Singles and doubles draws	(Sweden) Rebecca Peterson; 6–2, 6–1	(France) Mathilde Johansson	(Switzerland) Xenia Knoll (Netherlands) Cindy Burger	(Bulgaria) Dia Evtimova (France) Fiona Ferro (Belgium) Marie Benoît (Germany) Tamara Korpatsch
June 15	Ystad, Sweden; Clay $25,000; Singles and doubles draws	(Switzerland) Xenia Knoll (Sweden) Cornelia Lister; 7–5, 7–6^{(7–5)}	(Switzerland) Conny Perrin (South Africa) Chanel Simmonds	(Switzerland) Xenia Knoll (Netherlands) Cindy Burger	(Bulgaria) Dia Evtimova (France) Fiona Ferro (Belgium) Marie Benoît (Germany) Tamara Korpatsch
June 15	Sumter, United States; Hard $25,000; Singles and doubles draws	(Japan) Mayo Hibi; 6–4, 3–6, 6–4	(United States) Lauren Embree	(Canada) Carol Zhao (United States) Jennifer Brady	(United States) Jan Abaza (United States) Danielle Lao (Japan) Mari Osaka (United States) Sanaz Marand
June 15	Sumter, United States; Hard $25,000; Singles and doubles draws	(United States) Alexandra Mueller (United States) Ashley Weinhold; 5–7, 7–5, [10–6]	(United States) Jacqueline Cako (United States) Danielle Lao	(Canada) Carol Zhao (United States) Jennifer Brady	(United States) Jan Abaza (United States) Danielle Lao (Japan) Mari Osaka (United States) Sanaz Marand
June 15	Fergana Challenger; Fergana, Uzbekistan; Hard $25,000; Singles and doubles draws	(Russia) Anastasiya Komardina; 6–2, 1–6, 6–4	(Uzbekistan) Sabina Sharipova	(Japan) Hiroko Kuwata (Slovenia) Tadeja Majerič	(India) Natasha Palha (Ukraine) Valeriya Strakhova (Russia) Veronika Kudermetova (Russia) Margarita Lazareva
June 15	Fergana Challenger; Fergana, Uzbekistan; Hard $25,000; Singles and doubles draws	(India) Sharmada Balu (Slovenia) Tadeja Majerič; 7–5, 6–3	(Uzbekistan) Vlada Ekshibarova (India) Natasha Palha	(Japan) Hiroko Kuwata (Slovenia) Tadeja Majerič	(India) Natasha Palha (Ukraine) Valeriya Strakhova (Russia) Veronika Kudermetova (Russia) Margarita Lazareva
June 15	Přerov, Czech Republic; Clay $15,000; Singles and doubles draws	(Czech Republic) Markéta Vondroušová; 6–1, 6–4	(Russia) Ekaterina Alexandrova	(Czech Republic) Jesika Malečková (Slovakia) Petra Uberalová	(Hungary) Réka-Luca Jani (Liechtenstein) Kathinka von Deichmann (Austria) Barbara Haas (Russia) Polina Leykina
June 15	Přerov, Czech Republic; Clay $15,000; Singles and doubles draws	(Czech Republic) Miriam Kolodziejová (Czech Republic) Markéta Vondroušová; 6–4, 6–1	(Czech Republic) Martina Borecká (Czech Republic) Jesika Malečková	(Czech Republic) Jesika Malečková (Slovakia) Petra Uberalová	(Hungary) Réka-Luca Jani (Liechtenstein) Kathinka von Deichmann (Austria) Barbara Haas (Russia) Polina Leykina
June 15	Victoria, Canada; Hard (indoor) $10,000; Singles and doubles draws	(United States) Gail Brodsky; 3–6, 6–2, 7–6^{(7–3)}	(Hungary) Naomi Totka	(United States) Kristina Smith (Canada) Rosie Johanson	(Canada) Lauren Chypyha (Canada) Stacey Fung (United States) Malika Rose (United States) Karina Vyrlan
June 15	Victoria, Canada; Hard (indoor) $10,000; Singles and doubles draws	(Canada) Rosie Johanson (Canada) Daniella Silva; 6–3, 6–2	(United States) Joanna Smith (United States) Kristina Smith	(United States) Kristina Smith (Canada) Rosie Johanson	(Canada) Lauren Chypyha (Canada) Stacey Fung (United States) Malika Rose (United States) Karina Vyrlan
June 15	Anning, China; Clay $10,000; Singles and doubles draws	(China) You Xiaodi; 7–5, 6–3	(India) Sowjanya Bavisetti	(China) Kang Jiaqi (China) Sun Xuliu	(China) Gao Xinyu (China) Zhao Di (China) Guo Hanyu (China) Gai Ao
June 15	Anning, China; Clay $10,000; Singles and doubles draws	(China) Gao Xinyu (China) Zhang Ying; 6–4, 6–2	(China) Li Yihong (China) Tang Qianhui	(China) Kang Jiaqi (China) Sun Xuliu	(China) Gao Xinyu (China) Zhao Di (China) Guo Hanyu (China) Gai Ao
June 15	Sharm el-Sheikh, Egypt; Hard $10,000; Singles and doubles draws	(Australia) Sara Tomic; 6–4, 6–1	(Netherlands) Eva Wacanno	(India) Sri Peddi Reddy (India) Rishika Sunkara	(Republic of Ireland) Jenny Claffey (Czech Republic) Martina Přádová (Spain) Olga Parres Azcoitia (Switzerland) Susan Bandecchi
June 15	Sharm el-Sheikh, Egypt; Hard $10,000; Singles and doubles draws	(India) Rishika Sunkara (Netherlands) Eva Wacanno; 6–1, 6–1	(Spain) Olga Parres Azcoitia (India) Prarthana Thombare	(India) Sri Peddi Reddy (India) Rishika Sunkara	(Republic of Ireland) Jenny Claffey (Czech Republic) Martina Přádová (Spain) Olga Parres Azcoitia (Switzerland) Susan Bandecchi
June 15	Telavi, Georgia; Clay $10,000; Singles and doubles draws	(Ukraine) Katarina Zavatska; 6–1, 7–5	(France) Julie Razafindranaly	(Georgia (country)) Tinatin Kavlashvili (Russia) Adeliya Zabirova	(Georgia (country)) Ana Shanidze (France) Angela Leweurs (Italy) Marianna Natali (Belgium) Eugénie Chapelle
June 15	Telavi, Georgia; Clay $10,000; Singles and doubles draws	(Georgia (country)) Mariam Bolkvadze (Georgia (country)) Tinatin Kavlashvili; 6–4, 7–5	(Italy) Marianna Natali (Japan) Seira Shimizu	(Georgia (country)) Tinatin Kavlashvili (Russia) Adeliya Zabirova	(Georgia (country)) Ana Shanidze (France) Angela Leweurs (Italy) Marianna Natali (Belgium) Eugénie Chapelle
June 15	Grand-Baie, Mauritius; Hard $10,000; Singles and doubles draws	(Czech Republic) Marie Bouzková; 6–3, 6–4	(France) Lou Brouleau	(South Africa) Ilze Hattingh (South Africa) Madrie Le Roux	(India) Snehadevi Reddy (India) Prerna Bhambri (United States) Jaeda Daniel (Germany) Jasmin Jebawy
June 15	Grand-Baie, Mauritius; Hard $10,000; Singles and doubles draws	(Czech Republic) Marie Bouzková (Netherlands) Rosalie van der Hoek; 6–3, 7–5	(South Africa) Ilze Hattingh (South Africa) Madrie Le Roux	(South Africa) Ilze Hattingh (South Africa) Madrie Le Roux	(India) Snehadevi Reddy (India) Prerna Bhambri (United States) Jaeda Daniel (Germany) Jasmin Jebawy
June 15	Manzanillo, Mexico; Hard $10,000; Singles and doubles draws	(Chile) Daniela Seguel; 3–6, 6–4, 6–4	(Mexico) Nazari Urbina	(Chile) Fernanda Brito (Mexico) Renata Zarazúa	(Mexico) María José Portillo Ramírez (Samoa) Steffi Carruthers (Mexico) Carolina Betancourt (Venezuela) Mariaryeni Gutiérrez
June 15	Manzanillo, Mexico; Hard $10,000; Singles and doubles draws	(United States) Zoë Gwen Scandalis (Mexico) Renata Zarazúa; 6–1, 6–2	(Chile) Bárbara Gatica (Argentina) Stephanie Petit	(Chile) Fernanda Brito (Mexico) Renata Zarazúa	(Mexico) María José Portillo Ramírez (Samoa) Steffi Carruthers (Mexico) Carolina Betancourt (Venezuela) Mariaryeni Gutiérrez
June 15	Alkmaar, Netherlands; Clay $10,000; Singles and doubles draws	(Belgium) Elyne Boeykens; 3–6, 6–4, 6–3	(Czech Republic) Diana Šumová	(Austria) Melanie Klaffner (United States) Sabrina Santamaria	(Belgium) Catherine Chantraine (Russia) Marta Paigina (Netherlands) Nikki Luttikhuis (Germany) Natalia Siedliska
June 15	Alkmaar, Netherlands; Clay $10,000; Singles and doubles draws	(Australia) Sally Peers (Poland) Sandra Zaniewska; 6–3, 6–4	(Germany) Anna Klasen (Germany) Charlotte Klasen	(Austria) Melanie Klaffner (United States) Sabrina Santamaria	(Belgium) Catherine Chantraine (Russia) Marta Paigina (Netherlands) Nikki Luttikhuis (Germany) Natalia Siedliska
June 15	Niš, Serbia; Clay $10,000; Singles and doubles draws	(Serbia) Milana Špremo; 6–2, 6–4	(Slovakia) Chantal Škamlová	(Bulgaria) Viktoriya Tomova (Serbia) Dejana Radanović	(Hungary) Csilla Argyelán (Slovenia) Natalija Šipek (Bulgaria) Petia Arshinkova (Greece) Valentini Grammatikopoulou
June 15	Niš, Serbia; Clay $10,000; Singles and doubles draws	(Argentina) Ailen Crespo Azconzábal (Argentina) Ana Victoria Gobbi Monllau; 6–1, 6–2	(Ukraine) Maryna Kolb (Ukraine) Nadiya Kolb	(Bulgaria) Viktoriya Tomova (Serbia) Dejana Radanović	(Hungary) Csilla Argyelán (Slovenia) Natalija Šipek (Bulgaria) Petia Arshinkova (Greece) Valentini Grammatikopoulou
June 15	Tarsus, Turkey; Clay $10,000; Singles and doubles draws	(North Macedonia) Lina Gjorcheska; 6–2, 6–4	(Slovakia) Lenka Wienerová	(Germany) Nora Niedmers (France) Caroline Roméo	(United Kingdom) Mirabelle Njoze (Bulgaria) Julia Stamatova (Germany) Julia Wachaczyk (France) Margot Yerolymos
June 15	Tarsus, Turkey; Clay $10,000; Singles and doubles draws	(North Macedonia) Lina Gjorcheska (Turkey) Melis Sezer; 6–3, 6–1	(Germany) Nora Niedmers (Germany) Alina Wessel	(Germany) Nora Niedmers (France) Caroline Roméo	(United Kingdom) Mirabelle Njoze (Bulgaria) Julia Stamatova (Germany) Julia Wachaczyk (France) Margot Yerolymos
June 22	Périgueux, France; Clay $25,000; Singles and doubles draws	(France) Mathilde Johansson; 6–4, 6–2	(France) Chloé Paquet	(Paraguay) Montserrat González (France) Fiona Ferro	(Argentina) Florencia Molinero (Argentina) Paula Ormaechea (Russia) Natalia Vikhlyantseva (France) Elixane Lechemia
June 22	Périgueux, France; Clay $25,000; Singles and doubles draws	(Brazil) Gabriela Cé (Argentina) Florencia Molinero; 6–3, 6–2	(Mexico) Victoria Rodríguez (Mexico) Marcela Zacarías	(Paraguay) Montserrat González (France) Fiona Ferro	(Argentina) Florencia Molinero (Argentina) Paula Ormaechea (Russia) Natalia Vikhlyantseva (France) Elixane Lechemia
June 22	Moscow, Russia; Clay $25,000; Singles and doubles draws	(Russia) Irina Khromacheva; 6–2, 6–2	(Russia) Valentyna Ivakhnenko	(Israel) Deniz Khazaniuk (Ukraine) Olga Fridman	(Russia) Anastasia Pivovarova (Russia) Olga Puchkova (Croatia) Ema Mikulčić (Bosnia and Herzegovina) Dea Herdželaš
June 22	Moscow, Russia; Clay $25,000; Singles and doubles draws	(Russia) Irina Khromacheva (Russia) Polina Leykina; 7–5, 7–5	(Ukraine) Alona Fomina (Ukraine) Anastasiya Vasylyeva	(Israel) Deniz Khazaniuk (Ukraine) Olga Fridman	(Russia) Anastasia Pivovarova (Russia) Olga Puchkova (Croatia) Ema Mikulčić (Bosnia and Herzegovina) Dea Herdželaš
June 22	Helsingborg, Sweden; Clay $25,000; Singles and doubles draws	(Sweden) Sofia Arvidsson; 6–7^{(4–7)}, 6–1, 6–2	(Sweden) Malin Ulvefeldt	(United States) Bernarda Pera (Belgium) Marie Benoît	(Austria) Lisa-Maria Moser (Croatia) Ana Vrljić (Turkey) Pemra Özgen (Sweden) Rebecca Peterson
June 22	Helsingborg, Sweden; Clay $25,000; Singles and doubles draws	(Turkey) Pemra Özgen (United States) Bernarda Pera; 6–2, 6–0	(Georgia (country)) Ekaterine Gorgodze (Sweden) Cornelia Lister	(United States) Bernarda Pera (Belgium) Marie Benoît	(Austria) Lisa-Maria Moser (Croatia) Ana Vrljić (Turkey) Pemra Özgen (Sweden) Rebecca Peterson
June 22	Lenzerheide, Switzerland; Clay $25,000; Singles and doubles draws	(Czech Republic) Tereza Martincová; 6–3, 6–4	(Slovenia) Nastja Kolar	(Italy) Giulia Gatto-Monticone (Switzerland) Amra Sadiković	(Slovenia) Tadeja Majerič (Germany) Antonia Lottner (Serbia) Doroteja Erić (Switzerland) Xenia Knoll
June 22	Lenzerheide, Switzerland; Clay $25,000; Singles and doubles draws	(Spain) Yvonne Cavallé Reimers (Switzerland) Karin Kennel; Walkover	(Switzerland) Xenia Knoll (Germany) Antonia Lottner	(Italy) Giulia Gatto-Monticone (Switzerland) Amra Sadiković	(Slovenia) Tadeja Majerič (Germany) Antonia Lottner (Serbia) Doroteja Erić (Switzerland) Xenia Knoll
June 22	Baton Rouge, United States; Hard $25,000; Singles and doubles draws	(United States) Danielle Lao; 7–5, 6–3	(United States) Brooke Austin	(United States) Usue Maitane Arconada (United States) Samantha Crawford	(United States) Julia Jones (Chinese Taipei) Hsu Chieh-yu (Canada) Carol Zhao (Portugal) Joana Valle Costa
June 22	Baton Rouge, United States; Hard $25,000; Singles and doubles draws	(United States) Samantha Crawford (United States) Emily Harman; 7–6^{(7–4)}, 6–1	(Australia) Storm Sanders (South Africa) Chanel Simmonds	(United States) Usue Maitane Arconada (United States) Samantha Crawford	(United States) Julia Jones (Chinese Taipei) Hsu Chieh-yu (Canada) Carol Zhao (Portugal) Joana Valle Costa
June 22	Breda, Netherlands; Clay $15,000; Singles and doubles draws	(Czech Republic) Jesika Malečková; 6–3, 5–7, 7–5	(Poland) Sandra Zaniewska	(Italy) Anastasia Grymalska (Austria) Pia König	(Ukraine) Alyona Sotnikova (Austria) Barbara Haas (Switzerland) Conny Perrin (France) Clothilde de Bernardi
June 22	Breda, Netherlands; Clay $15,000; Singles and doubles draws	(Belarus) Sviatlana Pirazhenka (Ukraine) Alyona Sotnikova; 6–3, 6–1	(Austria) Barbara Haas (Austria) Pia König	(Italy) Anastasia Grymalska (Austria) Pia König	(Ukraine) Alyona Sotnikova (Austria) Barbara Haas (Switzerland) Conny Perrin (France) Clothilde de Bernardi
June 22	Anning, China; Clay $10,000; Singles and doubles draws	(China) Gao Xinyu; 6–4, 1–6, 6–4	(China) Gai Ao	(China) Kang Jiaqi (China) Lu Jiaxi	(China) You Xiaodi (China) Zhao Di (China) Liu Siqi (China) Guo Shanshan
June 22	Anning, China; Clay $10,000; Singles and doubles draws	(China) Chen Jiahui (China) Xin Yuan; 6–0, 6–4	(China) Gai Ao (China) Sheng Yuqi	(China) Kang Jiaqi (China) Lu Jiaxi	(China) You Xiaodi (China) Zhao Di (China) Liu Siqi (China) Guo Shanshan
June 22	Sharm el-Sheikh, Egypt; Hard $10,000; Singles and doubles draws	(Spain) Nuria Párrizas Díaz; 6–1, 6–3	(Egypt) Sandra Samir	(Russia) Yana Sizikova (India) Eetee Maheta	(Italy) Jasmin Ladurner (Netherlands) Eva Wacanno (Thailand) Tamachan Momkoonthod (Germany) Luisa Marie Huber
June 22	Sharm el-Sheikh, Egypt; Hard $10,000; Singles and doubles draws	(India) Prarthana Thombare (Netherlands) Eva Wacanno; 6–4, 7–6^{(7–5)}	(Egypt) Ola Abou Zekry (Greece) Eleni Kordolaimi	(Russia) Yana Sizikova (India) Eetee Maheta	(Italy) Jasmin Ladurner (Netherlands) Eva Wacanno (Thailand) Tamachan Momkoonthod (Germany) Luisa Marie Huber
June 22	Telavi, Georgia; Clay $10,000; Singles and doubles draws	(Slovenia) Tamara Zidanšek; 6–4, 6–1	(Belarus) Sadafmoh Tolibova	(Georgia (country)) Mariam Bolkvadze (Italy) Martina Spigarelli	(Japan) Seira Shimizu (Russia) Adeliya Zabirova (Slovenia) Pia Čuk (Hungary) Rebeka Stolmár
June 22	Telavi, Georgia; Clay $10,000; Singles and doubles draws	(Hungary) Rebeka Stolmár (Hungary) Szabina Szlavikovics; 6–2, 6–2	(Italy) Federica Arcidiacono (Italy) Martina Spigarelli	(Georgia (country)) Mariam Bolkvadze (Italy) Martina Spigarelli	(Japan) Seira Shimizu (Russia) Adeliya Zabirova (Slovenia) Pia Čuk (Hungary) Rebeka Stolmár
June 22	Rome, Italy; Clay $10,000; Singles and doubles draws	(Switzerland) Lisa Sabino; 1–6, 6–3, 6–3	(Italy) Anna Remondina	(Italy) Martina Di Giuseppe (Italy) Bianca Turati	(Czech Republic) Karolína Muchová (Italy) Francesca Palmigiano (Italy) Carolina Pillot (Italy) Lucrezia Stefanini
June 22	Rome, Italy; Clay $10,000; Singles and doubles draws	(Italy) Martina Di Giuseppe (Italy) Anna Remondina; 4–6, 6–2, [10–3]	(Italy) Giulia Carbonaro (Italy) Federica Spazzacampagna	(Italy) Martina Di Giuseppe (Italy) Bianca Turati	(Czech Republic) Karolína Muchová (Italy) Francesca Palmigiano (Italy) Carolina Pillot (Italy) Lucrezia Stefanini
June 22	Grand-Baie, Mauritius; Hard $10,000; Singles and doubles draws	(Czech Republic) Marie Bouzková; 7–5, 6–2	(United States) Jaeda Daniel	(France) Lou Brouleau (India) Kyra Shroff	(South Africa) Ilze Hattingh (India) Snehadevi Reddy (Germany) Jasmin Jebawy (France) Pauline Payet
June 22	Grand-Baie, Mauritius; Hard $10,000; Singles and doubles draws	(South Africa) Ilze Hattingh (South Africa) Madrie Le Roux; 6–2, 6–4	(India) Snehadevi Reddy (India) Dhruthi Tatachar Venugopal	(France) Lou Brouleau (India) Kyra Shroff	(South Africa) Ilze Hattingh (India) Snehadevi Reddy (Germany) Jasmin Jebawy (France) Pauline Payet
June 22	Manzanillo, Mexico; Hard $10,000; Singles and doubles draws	(Mexico) Giuliana Olmos; 5–7, 6–2, 7–5	(Mexico) Nazari Urbina	(United States) Zoë Gwen Scandalis (Mexico) Constanza Gorches	(Chile) Daniela Seguel (Russia) Alina Silich (Mexico) Carolina Betancourt (Russia) Anastasia Evgenyevna Nefedova
June 22	Manzanillo, Mexico; Hard $10,000; Singles and doubles draws	(Mexico) Camila Fuentes (United States) Zoë Gwen Scandalis; 6–3, 5–7, [12–10]	(Mexico) Carolina Betancourt (Chile) Daniela Seguel	(United States) Zoë Gwen Scandalis (Mexico) Constanza Gorches	(Chile) Daniela Seguel (Russia) Alina Silich (Mexico) Carolina Betancourt (Russia) Anastasia Evgenyevna Nefedova
June 22	Cantanhede, Portugal; Carpet $10,000; Singles and doubles draws	(Italy) Cristiana Ferrando; 6–4, 7–6^{(8–6)}	(Netherlands) Kelly Versteeg	(Portugal) Maria João Koehler (France) Estelle Guisard	(Bulgaria) Julia Stamatova (Spain) Ainhoa Atucha Gómez (Spain) María Gutiérrez Carrasco (Spain) Olga Parres Azcoitia
June 22	Cantanhede, Portugal; Carpet $10,000; Singles and doubles draws	(Netherlands) Kelly Versteeg (Netherlands) Erika Vogelsang; 7–5, 6–2	(Spain) María Martínez Martínez (Spain) Olga Parres Azcoitia	(Portugal) Maria João Koehler (France) Estelle Guisard	(Bulgaria) Julia Stamatova (Spain) Ainhoa Atucha Gómez (Spain) María Gutiérrez Carrasco (Spain) Olga Parres Azcoitia
June 22	Prokuplje, Serbia; Clay $10,000; Singles and doubles draws	(Australia) Alexandra Nancarrow; 6–1, 7–5	(Serbia) Milana Špremo	(Slovakia) Chantal Škamlová (Serbia) Dejana Radanović	(North Macedonia) Lina Gjorcheska (Czech Republic) Tereza Malíková (Serbia) Marina Kačar (Slovenia) Natalija Šipek
June 22	Prokuplje, Serbia; Clay $10,000; Singles and doubles draws	(North Macedonia) Lina Gjorcheska (Australia) Alexandra Nancarrow; 6–2, 6–2	(Czech Republic) Dominika Paterová (Czech Republic) Vendula Žovincová	(Slovakia) Chantal Škamlová (Serbia) Dejana Radanović	(North Macedonia) Lina Gjorcheska (Czech Republic) Tereza Malíková (Serbia) Marina Kačar (Slovenia) Natalija Šipek
June 22	Gwangju, South Korea; Hard $10,000; Singles and doubles draws	(South Korea) Lee So-ra; 6–1, 6–2	(South Korea) Hong Seung-yeon	(South Korea) Choi Ji-hee (South Korea) Kim Na-ri	(South Korea) Lee Ji-hee (South Korea) Lee Jin-ju (South Korea) Kim Ju-eun (South Korea) Sul You-na
June 22	Gwangju, South Korea; Hard $10,000; Singles and doubles draws	(South Korea) Choi Ji-hee (South Korea) Kim Na-ri; 6–1, 1–6, [10–5]	(South Korea) Hong Seung-yeon (South Korea) Kim Ju-eun	(South Korea) Choi Ji-hee (South Korea) Kim Na-ri	(South Korea) Lee Ji-hee (South Korea) Lee Jin-ju (South Korea) Kim Ju-eun (South Korea) Sul You-na
June 22	Kaohsiung, Taiwan; Hard $10,000; Singles and doubles draws	(Chinese Taipei) Lee Ya-hsuan; 6–4, 2–6, 6–3	(Chinese Taipei) Hsu Ching-wen	(Chinese Taipei) Lee Pei-chi (Japan) Natsumi Chimura	(Chinese Taipei) Fan Chiang Sing-le (Chinese Taipei) Liang En-shuo (Japan) Michika Ozeki (Japan) Haruka Kaji
June 22	Kaohsiung, Taiwan; Hard $10,000; Singles and doubles draws	(Chinese Taipei) Lee Pei-chi (Japan) Hirono Watanabe; 6–3, 7–5	(Chinese Taipei) Lee Ya-hsuan (Chinese Taipei) Pai Ya-yun	(Chinese Taipei) Lee Pei-chi (Japan) Natsumi Chimura	(Chinese Taipei) Fan Chiang Sing-le (Chinese Taipei) Liang En-shuo (Japan) Michika Ozeki (Japan) Haruka Kaji
June 22	Balıkesir, Turkey; Clay $10,000; Singles and doubles draws	(Turkey) Başak Eraydın; 6–3, 5–7, 6–3	(Turkey) Melis Sezer	(Germany) Nora Niedmers (Turkey) Ayla Aksu	(Sweden) Anette Munozova (Romania) Cristina Adamescu (United Kingdom) Mirabelle Njoze (Germany) Lisa-Marie Mätschke
June 22	Balıkesir, Turkey; Clay $10,000; Singles and doubles draws	(Turkey) Ayla Aksu (Turkey) Melis Sezer; 6–3, 6–2	(Romania) Cristina Adamescu (Turkey) Cemre Anıl	(Germany) Nora Niedmers (Turkey) Ayla Aksu	(Sweden) Anette Munozova (Romania) Cristina Adamescu (United Kingdom) Mirabelle Njoze (Germany) Lisa-Marie Mätschke
June 29	Denain, France; Clay $25,000; Singles and doubles draws	(Spain) Paula Badosa Gibert; 7–5, 6–0	(France) Irina Ramialison	(Mexico) Marcela Zacarías (Belgium) Elise Mertens	(Netherlands) Cindy Burger (France) Alizé Lim (Turkey) İpek Soylu (Argentina) Florencia Molinero
June 29	Denain, France; Clay $25,000; Singles and doubles draws	(Belgium) Elise Mertens (Turkey) İpek Soylu; 7–6^{(7–3)}, 6–3	(Switzerland) Xenia Knoll (Argentina) Florencia Molinero	(Mexico) Marcela Zacarías (Belgium) Elise Mertens	(Netherlands) Cindy Burger (France) Alizé Lim (Turkey) İpek Soylu (Argentina) Florencia Molinero
June 29	Stuttgart, Germany; Clay $25,000; Singles and doubles draws	(Japan) Risa Ozaki; 6–4, 7–5	(Switzerland) Romina Oprandi	(Hungary) Réka-Luca Jani (Germany) Antonia Lottner	(Russia) Marina Melnikova (Uzbekistan) Akgul Amanmuradova (Spain) Laura Pous Tió (Belarus) Iryna Shymanovich
June 29	Stuttgart, Germany; Clay $25,000; Singles and doubles draws	(Russia) Maria Marfutina (Belarus) Iryna Shymanovich; 6–2, 4–6, [10–8]	(Czech Republic) Lenka Kunčíková (Czech Republic) Karolína Stuchlá	(Hungary) Réka-Luca Jani (Germany) Antonia Lottner	(Russia) Marina Melnikova (Uzbekistan) Akgul Amanmuradova (Spain) Laura Pous Tió (Belarus) Iryna Shymanovich
June 29	Toruń, Poland; Clay $25,000; Singles and doubles draws	(Slovakia) Kristína Kučová; 4–6, 6–1, 6–4	(Italy) Giulia Gatto-Monticone	(Czech Republic) Tereza Malíková (Bulgaria) Dia Evtimova	(Georgia (country)) Ekaterine Gorgodze (Czech Republic) Tereza Martincová (Georgia (country)) Sofia Shapatava (Austria) Melanie Klaffner
June 29	Toruń, Poland; Clay $25,000; Singles and doubles draws	(Georgia (country)) Ekaterine Gorgodze (Georgia (country)) Sofia Shapatava; 6–4, 6–4	(Poland) Magdalena Fręch (Philippines) Katharina Lehnert	(Czech Republic) Tereza Malíková (Bulgaria) Dia Evtimova	(Georgia (country)) Ekaterine Gorgodze (Czech Republic) Tereza Martincová (Georgia (country)) Sofia Shapatava (Austria) Melanie Klaffner
June 29	El Paso, United States; Hard $25,000; Singles and doubles draws	(United States) Jamie Loeb; 6–7^{(7–9)}, 6–4, 6–2	(United States) Jennifer Brady	(Japan) Mayo Hibi (United States) Robin Anderson	(Canada) Carol Zhao (United States) Sanaz Marand (United States) Maegan Manasse (Australia) Storm Sanders
June 29	El Paso, United States; Hard $25,000; Singles and doubles draws	(United States) Jennifer Brady (Chile) Alexa Guarachi; 3–6, 6–3, [10–7]	(United States) Robin Anderson (United States) Maegan Manasse	(Japan) Mayo Hibi (United States) Robin Anderson	(Canada) Carol Zhao (United States) Sanaz Marand (United States) Maegan Manasse (Australia) Storm Sanders
June 29	Zeeland, Netherlands; Clay $15,000; Singles and doubles draws	(Netherlands) Quirine Lemoine; 6–1, 6–2	(Netherlands) Arantxa Rus	(United States) Bernarda Pera (Ukraine) Alyona Sotnikova	(Netherlands) Lesley Kerkhove (United States) Sabrina Santamaria (Mexico) Ana Sofía Sánchez (Czech Republic) Jesika Malečková
June 29	Zeeland, Netherlands; Clay $15,000; Singles and doubles draws	(Netherlands) Lesley Kerkhove (Netherlands) Quirine Lemoine; 6–2, 3–6, [10–3]	(Switzerland) Conny Perrin (Ukraine) Alyona Sotnikova	(United States) Bernarda Pera (Ukraine) Alyona Sotnikova	(Netherlands) Lesley Kerkhove (United States) Sabrina Santamaria (Mexico) Ana Sofía Sánchez (Czech Republic) Jesika Malečková
June 29	Brussels, Belgium; Clay $10,000; Singles and doubles draws	(Belgium) Elyne Boeykens; 6–4, 6–0	(Italy) Alice Matteucci	(Germany) Dana Kremer (Belgium) Sofie Oyen	(Italy) Alice Balducci (Belgium) Britt Geukens (Belgium) Hélène Scholsen (Switzerland) Tess Sugnaux
June 29	Brussels, Belgium; Clay $10,000; Singles and doubles draws	(Netherlands) Mandy Wagemaker (Netherlands) Janneke Wikkerink; 6–1, 6–1	(Belgium) Steffi Distelmans (Belgium) Hélène Scholsen	(Germany) Dana Kremer (Belgium) Sofie Oyen	(Italy) Alice Balducci (Belgium) Britt Geukens (Belgium) Hélène Scholsen (Switzerland) Tess Sugnaux
June 29	Sharm el-Sheikh, Egypt; Hard $10,000; Singles and doubles draws	(Russia) Angelina Zhuravleva; 4–6, 7–6^{(7–3)}, 7–6^{(7–5)}	(Russia) Yana Sizikova	(Russia) Polina Malykh (Australia) Astra Sharma	(Thailand) Tamachan Momkoonthod (Ukraine) Veronika Stotyka (United States) Karyn Guttormsen (Germany) Amelie Intert
June 29	Sharm el-Sheikh, Egypt; Hard $10,000; Singles and doubles draws	(Germany) Luisa Marie Huber (Germany) Amelie Intert; 6–2, 2–6, [10–7]	(Egypt) Ola Abou Zekry (Greece) Eleni Kordolaimi	(Russia) Polina Malykh (Australia) Astra Sharma	(Thailand) Tamachan Momkoonthod (Ukraine) Veronika Stotyka (United States) Karyn Guttormsen (Germany) Amelie Intert
June 29	La Possession, Réunion, France; Hard $10,000; Singles and doubles draws	(Czech Republic) Marie Bouzková; 6–2, 6–3	(South Africa) Ilze Hattingh	(Madagascar) Sandra Andriamarosoa (France) Pauline Payet	(France) Fiona Codino (Germany) Jasmin Jebawy (India) Kyra Shroff (Cyprus) Jovana Knezevic
June 29	La Possession, Réunion, France; Hard $10,000; Singles and doubles draws	(South Africa) Ilze Hattingh (France) Pauline Payet; 6–4, 6–3	(South Africa) Caitlin Herb (India) Tanisha Rohira	(Madagascar) Sandra Andriamarosoa (France) Pauline Payet	(France) Fiona Codino (Germany) Jasmin Jebawy (India) Kyra Shroff (Cyprus) Jovana Knezevic
June 29	Telavi, Georgia; Clay $10,000; Singles and doubles draws	(Slovenia) Tamara Zidanšek; 6–3, 6–3	(Hungary) Szabina Szlavikovics	(Russia) Amina Anshba (Georgia (country)) Tinatin Kavlashvili	(Hungary) Rebeka Stolmár (Russia) Antonina Lysakova (Russia) Aminat Kushkhova (Belarus) Sadafmoh Tolibova
June 29	Telavi, Georgia; Clay $10,000; Singles and doubles draws	(Russia) Ksenija Sharifova (Russia) Liubov Vasilyeva; 6–2, 3–6, [10–7]	(Ukraine) Oxana Lyubtsova (Ukraine) Kateryna Sliusar	(Russia) Amina Anshba (Georgia (country)) Tinatin Kavlashvili	(Hungary) Rebeka Stolmár (Russia) Antonina Lysakova (Russia) Aminat Kushkhova (Belarus) Sadafmoh Tolibova
June 29	Amarante, Portugal; Hard $10,000; Singles and doubles draws	(Germany) Julia Wachaczyk; 7–5, 6–4	(Italy) Cristiana Ferrando	(Ecuador) Charlotte Römer (Spain) Ainhoa Atucha Gómez	(Portugal) Joana Valle Costa (Bulgaria) Julia Stamatova (Spain) María Martínez Martínez (France) Clémence Fayol
June 29	Amarante, Portugal; Hard $10,000; Singles and doubles draws	(Spain) Olga Parres Azcoitia (Bulgaria) Julia Stamatova; 6–4, 6–3	(Spain) María Martínez Martínez (Ecuador) Charlotte Römer	(Ecuador) Charlotte Römer (Spain) Ainhoa Atucha Gómez	(Portugal) Joana Valle Costa (Bulgaria) Julia Stamatova (Spain) María Martínez Martínez (France) Clémence Fayol
June 29	Prokuplje, Serbia; Clay $10,000; Singles and doubles draws	(Australia) Alexandra Nancarrow; 6–1, 3–6, 6–1	(Hungary) Lilla Barzó	(Romania) Oana Georgeta Simion (Romania) Simona Ionescu	(Slovenia) Natalija Šipek (Croatia) Nina Alibalić (Spain) Estrella Cabeza Candela (Slovenia) Polona Reberšak
June 29	Prokuplje, Serbia; Clay $10,000; Singles and doubles draws	(Spain) Estrella Cabeza Candela (Australia) Alexandra Nancarrow; 2–6, 6–4, [10–6]	(Ukraine) Maryna Kolb (Ukraine) Nadiya Kolb	(Romania) Oana Georgeta Simion (Romania) Simona Ionescu	(Slovenia) Natalija Šipek (Croatia) Nina Alibalić (Spain) Estrella Cabeza Candela (Slovenia) Polona Reberšak
June 29	Sakarya, Turkey; Hard $10,000; Singles and doubles draws	(Turkey) Başak Eraydın; 6–3, 6–1	(Italy) Valeria Prosperi	(Russia) Margarita Lazareva (Serbia) Tamara Čurović	(Sweden) Anette Munozova (Russia) Ekaterina Yashina (United Kingdom) Mirabelle Njoze (Romania) Cristina Adamescu
June 29	Sakarya, Turkey; Hard $10,000; Singles and doubles draws	(Serbia) Tamara Čurović (Russia) Ekaterina Yashina; 4–6, 6–1, [10–6]	(Turkey) Başak Eraydın (Russia) Margarita Lazareva	(Russia) Margarita Lazareva (Serbia) Tamara Čurović	(Sweden) Anette Munozova (Russia) Ekaterina Yashina (United Kingdom) Mirabelle Njoze (Romania) Cristina Adamescu
