= 2010 Fed Cup Europe/Africa Zone Group I – Pool A =

Group A of the 2010 Fed Cup Europe/Africa Zone Group I was one of four pools in the Europe/Africa Zone Group I of the 2010 Fed Cup. Four teams competed in a round-robin competition, with the top team and the bottom team proceeding to their respective sections of the play-offs: the top team played for advancement to the World Group II Play-offs, while the bottom team faced potential relegation to Group II.

		(Israel) ISR	(Netherlands) NED	(Slovenia) SLO	(Bulgaria) BUL	RR; W–L	Set; W–L	Game; W–L	Standings
17	Israel		0–3	1–2	2–1	1–2	7–12	77–102	3
33	Netherlands	3–0		1–2	2–1	2–1	15–9	131–108	2
40	Slovenia	2–1	2–1		1–2	2–1	10–11	99–102	1
48	Bulgaria	1–2	1–2	2–1		1–2	11–11	109–104	4

== Israel vs. Slovenia ==
Israel
1
Complexo de Tenis do Jamor, Estádio Nacional, Lisbon, Portugal
3 February 2010
Greenset Grand Prix hard (indoors)

Slovenia
2

			1	2	3
1	(Israel) (Slovenia)	Julia Glushko; Katarina Srebotnik	5; 7	1; 6
2	(Israel) (Slovenia)	Shahar Pe'er; Polona Hercog	6; 1	6; 4
3	(Israel) (Slovenia)	Julia Glushko / Shahar Pe'er; Polona Hercog / Katarina Srebotnik	1; 6	6^{7} 7^{9}

== Netherlands vs. Bulgaria ==
Netherlands
2
Complexo de Tenis do Jamor, Estádio Nacional, Lisbon, Portugal
3 February 2010
Greenset Grand Prix hard (indoors)

Bulgaria
1

			1	2	3
1	(Netherlands) (Bulgaria)	Chayenne Ewijk; Dia Evtimova	6; 1	6^{6} 7^{8}	6; 2
2	(Netherlands) (Bulgaria)	Arantxa Rus; Tsvetana Pironkova	6^{5} 7^{7}	6; 3	6; 4
3	(Netherlands) (Bulgaria)	Richèl Hogenkamp / Nicole Thijssen; Dia Evtimova / Tsvetana Pironkova	5; 7	7; 5	2; 6

== Israel vs. Bulgaria ==
Israel
2
Complexo de Tenis do Jamor, Estádio Nacional, Lisbon, Portugal
4 February 2010
Greenset Grand Prix hard (indoors)

Bulgaria
1

			1	2	3
1	(Israel) (Bulgaria)	Keren Shlomo; Dia Evtimova	0; 6	2; 6
2	(Israel) (Bulgaria)	Shahar Pe'er; Tsvetana Pironkova	7^{13} 6^{11}	6; 4
3	(Israel) (Bulgaria)	Julia Glushko / Shahar Pe'er; Dia Evtimova / Tsvetana Pironkova	6; 2	7; 5

== Netherlands vs. Slovenia ==
Netherlands
1
Complexo de Tenis do Jamor, Estádio Nacional, Lisbon, Portugal
4 February 2010
Greenset Grand Prix hard (indoors)

Slovenia
2

			1	2	3
1	(Netherlands) (Slovenia)	Chayenne Ewijk; Katarina Srebotnik	6; 4	3; 6	4; 6
2	(Netherlands) (Slovenia)	Arantxa Rus; Polona Hercog	7^{7} 6^{4}	5; 7	2; 6
3	(Netherlands) (Slovenia)	Richèl Hogenkamp / Nicole Thijssen; Andreja Klepač / Maša Zec Peškirič	6; 4	6; 4

== Israel vs. Netherlands ==
Israel
0
Complexo de Tenis do Jamor, Estádio Nacional, Lisbon, Portugal
5 February 2010
Greenset Grand Prix hard (indoors)

Netherlands
3

			1	2	3
1	(Israel) (Netherlands)	Julia Glushko; Chayenne Ewijk	4; 6	7^{7} 6^{3}	3; 6
2	(Israel) (Netherlands)	Shahar Pe'er; Arantxa Rus	2; 6	1; 6
3	(Israel) (Netherlands)	Chen Astrogo / Keren Shlomo; Richèl Hogenkamp / Nicole Thijssen	3; 6	3; 6

== Slovenia vs. Bulgaria ==
Slovenia
1
Complexo de Tenis do Jamor, Estádio Nacional, Lisbon, Portugal
5 February 2010
Greenset Grand Prix hard (indoors)

Bulgaria
2

			1	2	3
1	(Slovenia) (Bulgaria)	Andreja Klepač; Biljana Pawlowa-Dimitrova	4; 6	6; 4	6; 3
2	(Slovenia) (Bulgaria)	Maša Zec Peškirič; Elitsa Kostova	5; 7	1; 6
3	(Slovenia) (Bulgaria)	Andreja Klepač / Maša Zec Peškirič; Elitsa Kostova / Biljana Pawlowa-Dimitrova	1; 6	2; 6
