= Keren Shlomo =

Israeli tennis player

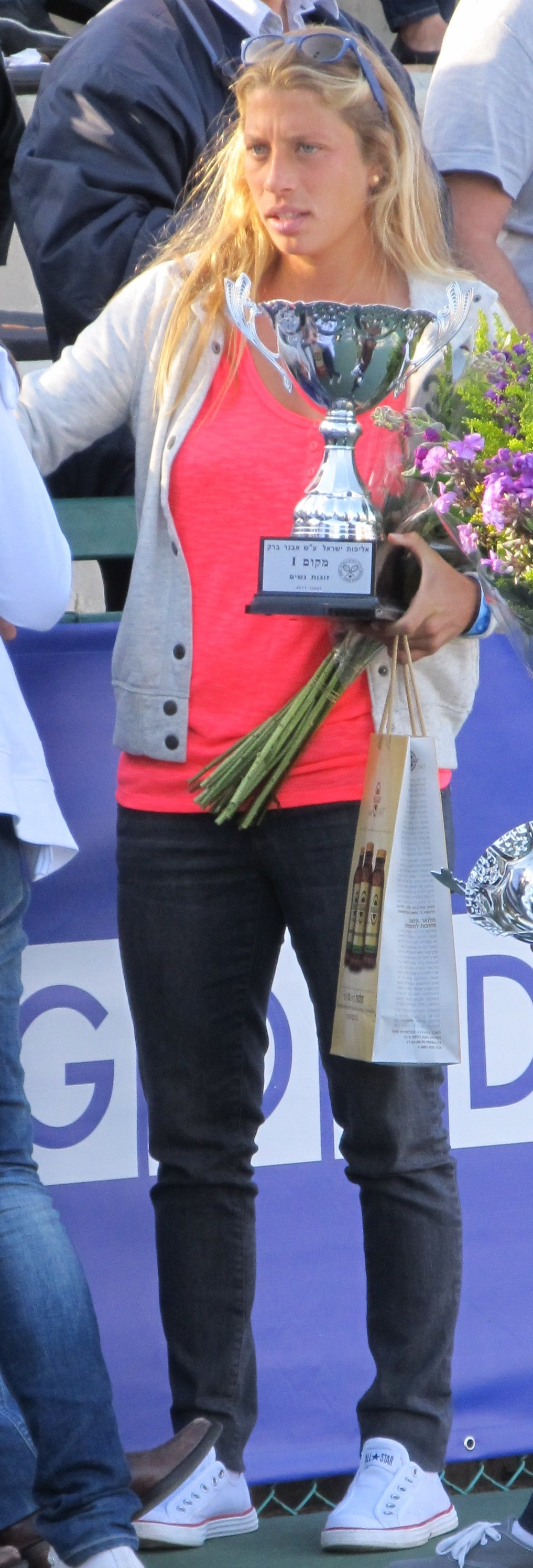
- Shlomo at the 2011 Israeli Tennis Championships
- Native name: קרן שלמה
- Country (sports): Israel
- Born: 14 January 1988 (age 38) Tel Aviv, Israel
- Height: 1.69 m (5 ft 7 in)
- Retired: 2018
- Prize money: US$ 85,522

Singles
- Career record: 250–246
- Career titles: 0 WTA, 3 ITF
- Highest ranking: 359 (7 May 2012)

Grand Slam singles results
- Australian Open Junior: Q2 (2006)

Doubles
- Career record: 185–205
- Career titles: 0 WTA, 9 ITF
- Highest ranking: 341 (18 June 2012)

Team competitions
- Fed Cup: 0–11

Keren Shlomo (Hebrew: קרן שלמה; born 14 January 1988 in Tel Aviv) is a retired Israeli tennis player.

Shlomo has won three singles and nine doubles titles on the ITF tour in her career. On 7 May 2012, she reached her best singles ranking of world number 359. On 18 June 2012, she peaked at world number 341 in the doubles rankings.

Shlomo made her debut for the Israel Fed Cup team in 2010 and has since made 11 appearances for her country in international competition.

== ITF finals (12–27) ==
=== Singles (3–9) ===
Legend $100,000 tournaments $75,000 tournaments $50,000 tournaments $25,000 tournaments $15,000 tournaments	Finals by surface Hard (3–9) Clay (0–0) Grass (0–0) Carpet (0–0)

Result	No.	Date	Tournament	Surface	Opponent	Score
Runner-up	1.	2 October 2007	Mytilene, Greece	Hard	(Poland) Olga Brózda	2–6, 4–6
Runner-up	2.	25 May 2009	New Delhi, India	Hard	(China) Duan Yingying	3–6, 4–6
Winner	1.	26 October 2009	Tel Aviv, Israel	Hard	(Russia) Polina Rodionova	5–7, 6–4, 7–5
Runner-up	3.	24 May 2010	Ra'anana, Israel	Hard	(Israel) Julia Glushko	1–6, 3–6
Winner	2.	2 May 2011	Hyderabad, India	Hard	(South Korea) Han Na-lae	6–1, 6–4
Winner	3.	9 May 2011	New Delhi, India	Hard	(Japan) Misa Kinoshita	2–6, 6–2, 6–2
Runner-up	4.	23 May 2011	Ra'anana, Israel	Hard	(Israel) Valeria Patiuk	4–6, 6–2, 1–6
Runner-up	5.	20 June 2011	New Delhi, India	Hard	(India) Prerna Bhambri	2–6, 3–6
Runner-up	6.	12 March 2012	Mumbai, India	Hard	(Serbia) Jovana Jakšić	3–6, 6–7^{(5–7)}
Runner-up	7.	3 December 2012	Potchefstroom, South Africa	Hard	(South Africa) Chanel Simmonds	1–6, 4–6
Runner-up	8.	3 June 2013	Herzliya, Israel	Hard	(Israel) Deniz Khazaniuk	1–6, 4–6
Runner-up	9.	17 August 2015	İzmir, Turkey	Hard	(Turkey) Ayla Aksu	6–2, 4–6, 6–7^{(4–7)}

=== Doubles (9–18) ===
Legend $100,000 tournaments $75,000 tournaments $50,000 tournaments $25,000 tournaments $15,000 tournaments	Finals by surface Hard (8–17) Clay (1–1) Grass (0–0) Carpet (0–0)

Result	No.	Date	Tournament	Surface	Partner	Opponents	Score
Runner-up	1.	18 June 2007	Alcobaça, Portugal	Hard	(Portugal) Joana Pangaio Pereira	(Canada) Mélanie Gloria (United States) Kady Pooler	1–6, 4–6
Runner-up	2.	19 November 2007	Ramat HaSharon, Israel	Hard	(Israel) Julia Glushko	(Belarus) Iryna Kuryanovich (Slovenia) Mika Urbančič	4–6, 1–6
Winner	1.	2 March 2009	Ra'anana, Israel	Clay	(Germany) Sarah Gronert	(Switzerland) Lucia Kovarčíková (Czech Republic) Zuzana Linhová	7–5, 7–5
Runner-up	3.	25 May 2009	New Delhi, India	Hard	(Australia) Kristina Pejkovic	(India) Rushmi Chakravarthi (China) He Chunyan	2–6, 1–6
Runner-up	4.	21 September 2009	Dehradun, India	Hard	(India) Poojashree Venkatesha	(Japan) Moe Kawatoko (Japan) Miki Miyamura	1–6, 3–6
Runner-up	5.	19 October 2009	Lagos, Nigeria	Hard	(Israel) Chen Astrogo	(Russia) Nina Bratchikova (Greece) Anna Gerasimou	4–6, 5–7
Winner	2.	26 October 2009	Tel Aviv, Israel	Hard	(Israel) Chen Astrogo	(Russia) Maya Gaverova (Russia) Anna Rapoport	6–7^{(5–7)}, 6–4, [10–7]
Winner	3.	24 May 2010	Ra'anana, Israel	Hard	(Israel) Julia Glushko	(Israel) Efrat Mishor (Russia) Anna Rapoport	3–6, 7–6^{(8–6)}, [10–3]
Winner	4.	13 September 2010	Mytilene, Greece	Hard	(Israel) Chen Astrogo	(Turkey) Başak Eraydın (Russia) Diana Isaeva	6–1, 6–3
Runner-up	6.	20 September 2010	Thessaloniki, Greece	Clay	(Israel) Chen Astrogo	(Germany) Kim Grajdek (Russia) Anastasia Mukhametova	2–6, 3–6
Runner-up	7.	13 June 2011	New Delhi, India	Hard	(India) Rushmi Chakravarthi	(South Korea) Kim Hae-sung (South Korea) Kim Ju-eun	3–6, 4–6
Runner-up	8.	20 June 2011	New Delhi, India	Hard	(India) Rushmi Chakravarthi	(South Korea) Kim Hae-sung (South Korea) Kim Ju-eun	5–7, 0–6
Runner-up	9.	16 January 2012	Le Gosier, Guadeloupe, France	Hard	(Russia) Margarita Lazareva	(United States) Whitney Jones (United States) Yasmin Schnack	6–2, 4–6, [14–16]
Winner	5.	1 October 2012	Kalamata, Greece	Hard	(Vietnam) Huỳnh Phương Đài Trang	(Liechtenstein) Kathinka von Deichmann (Germany) Stefanie Stemmer	3–6, 6–2, [12–10]
Winner	6.	3 December 2012	Potchefstroom, South Africa	Hard	(Germany) Kim Grajdek	(South Africa) Lynn Kiro (Madagascar) Zarah Razafimahatratra	2–6, 6–4, [10–8]
Runner-up	10.	10 December 2012	Potchefstroom, South Africa	Hard	(Germany) Kim Grajdek	(South Africa) Lynn Kiro (Madagascar) Zarah Razafimahatratra	w/o
Runner-up	11.	29 April 2013	Ashkelon, Israel	Hard	(United Kingdom) Laura Deigman	(Austria) Pia König (Israel) Ester Masuri	0–1, retired
Winner	7.	3 June 2013	Herzliya, Israel	Hard	(Israel) Lee Or	(Germany) Michaela Frlicka (Russia) Evgeniya Svintsova	w/o
Winner	8.	23 September 2013	Marathon-Athens, Greece	Hard	(Israel) Saray Sterenbach	(Chinese Taipei) Lee Pei-chi (Greece) Maria Sakkari	3–6, 6–1, [10–8]
Runner-up	12.	8 December 2014	Tel Aviv, Israel	Hard	(Israel) Valeria Patiuk	(Moldova) Julia Helbet (Russia) Marta Paigina	4–6, 2–6
Winner	9.	1 June 2015	Ramat Gan, Israel	Hard	(Israel) Valeria Patiuk	(Israel) Ofri Lankri (Israel) Alona Pushkarevsky	6–4, 6–2
Runner-up	13.	8 June 2015	Ramat Gan, Israel	Hard	(Israel) Valeria Patiuk	(Israel) Ofri Lankri (Israel) Alona Pushkarevsky	3–6, 4–6
Runner-up	14.	24 August 2015	Antalya, Turkey	Hard	(Germany) Kim Grajdek	(Ukraine) Alona Fomina (Germany) Alina Wessel	3–6, 3–6
Runner-up	15.	25 January 2016	Saint Martin, France	Hard	(United States) Alexandra Morozova	(United States) Emina Bektas (United States) Alexa Bortles	4–6, 2–6
Runner-up	16.	30 May 2016	Kiryat Shmona, Israel	Hard	(Israel) Vlada Ekshibarova	(Hungary) Naomi Totka (Montenegro) Ana Veselinović	1–6, 6–1, [6–10]
Runner-up	17.	12 September 2016	Ashkelon, Israel	Hard	(Israel) Alona Pushkarevsky	(Israel) Vlada Ekshibarova (United States) Madeleine Kobelt	6–4, 5–7, [8–10]
Runner-up	18.	28 November 2016	Ramat Gan, Israel	Hard	(Romania) Daiana Negreanu	(Israel) Vlada Ekshibarova (Russia) Ekaterina Yashina	2–6, 6–7^{(4–7)}

== Fed Cup participation ==
=== Singles ===
Edition	Stage	Date	Location	Against	Surface	Opponent	W/L	Score
2010 Fed Cup; Europe/Africa Zone Group I	R/R	4 February 2010	Lisbon, Portugal	Bulgaria	Hard (i)	(Bulgaria) Dia Evtimova	L	0–6, 3–6
2010 Fed Cup; Europe/Africa Zone Group I	P/O	6 February 2010	Lisbon, Portugal	Denmark	Hard (i)	(Denmark) Mai Grage	L	4–6, 4–6
2014 Fed Cup; Europe/Africa Zone Group I	P/O	9 February 2014	Budapest, Hungary	Hungary	Hard (i)	(Hungary) Réka Luca Jani	L	4–6, 3–6
2015 Fed Cup; Europe/Africa Zone Group I	R/R	4 February 2015	Budapest, Hungary	Croatia	Hard (i)	(Croatia) Ana Konjuh	L	3–6, 0–6

=== Doubles ===
Edition	Stage	Date	Location	Against	Surface	Partner	Opponents	W/L	Score
2010 Fed Cup; Europe/Africa Zone Group I	R/R	5 February 2010	Lisbon, Portugal	Netherlands	Hard (i)	(Israel) Chen Astrogo	(Netherlands) Richèl Hogenkamp (Netherlands) Nicole Thyssen	L	3–6, 3–6
2011 Fed Cup; Europe/Africa Zone Group I	R/R	4 February 2011	Eilat, Israel	Bulgaria	Hard	(Israel) Valeria Patiuk	(Bulgaria) Dia Evtimova (Bulgaria) Magdalena Maleeva	L	3–6, 4–6
2012 Fed Cup; Europe/Africa Zone Group I	R/R	3 February 2012	Eilat, Israel	(United Kingdom) Great Britain	Hard	(Israel) Julia Glushko	(United Kingdom) Laura Robson (United Kingdom) Heather Watson	L	2–6, 1–6
2013 Fed Cup; Europe/Africa Zone Group I	R/R	6 February 2013	Eilat, Israel	Turkey	Hard	(Israel) Valeria Patiuk	(Turkey) Başak Eraydın (Turkey) İpek Soylu	L	2–6, 1–6
2014 Fed Cup; Europe/Africa Zone Group I	P/O	9 February 2014	Budapest, Hungary	Hungary	Hard (i)	(Israel) Ofri Lankri	(Hungary) Réka Luca Jani (Hungary) Szabina Szlavikovics	L	3–6, 4–6
2015 Fed Cup; Europe/Africa Zone Group I	R/R	4 February 2015	Budapest, Hungary	Croatia	Hard (i)	(Israel) Alona Pushkarevsky	(Croatia) Darija Jurak (Croatia) Ana Konjuh	L	0–6, 0–6
2015 Fed Cup; Europe/Africa Zone Group I	R/R	6 February 2015	Budapest, Hungary	Latvia	Hard (i)	(Israel) Alona Pushkarevsky	(Latvia) Dārta Elizabete Emuliņa (Latvia) Jeļena Ostapenko	L	3–6, 6–2, 3–6

== See also ==
- Jews in Sports#Tennis
- List of Israelis
