= Zarah Razafimahatratra =

Malagasy tennis player (born 1994)

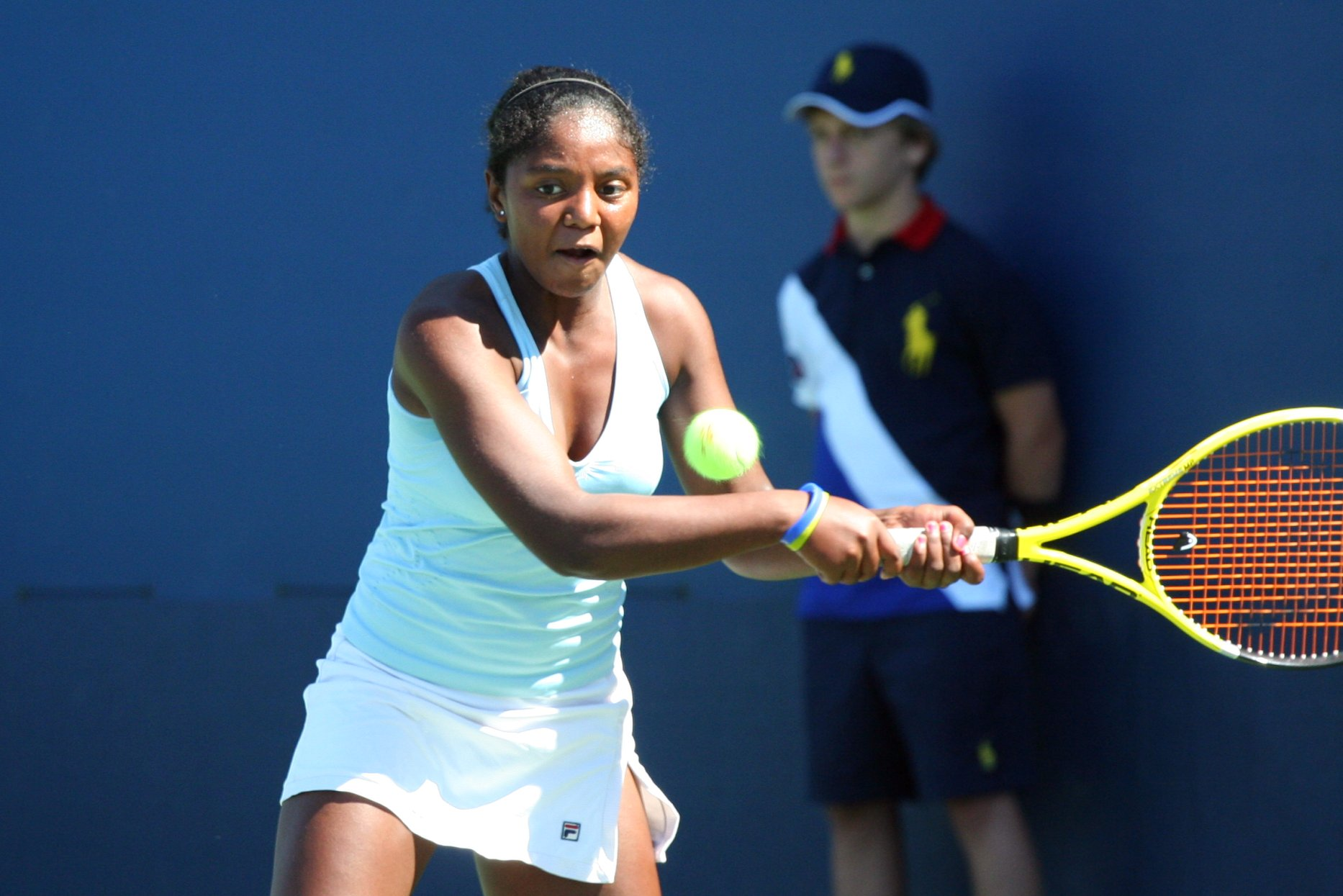
- At the 2010 US Open
- Country (sports): Madagascar
- Born: 24 August 1994 (age 30); Antananarivo, Madagascar
- Plays: Right-handed (two-handed backhand)
- Prize money: $14,832

Singles
- Career record: 45–28
- Career titles: 1 ITF
- Highest ranking: No. 545 (9 December 2013)

Grand Slam singles results
- French Open Junior: 1R (2010, 2011)
- Wimbledon Junior: 2R (2011)
- US Open Junior: 1R (2010, 2011)

Doubles
- Career record: 37–19
- Career titles: 5 ITF
- Highest ranking: No. 489 (12 August 2013)

Grand Slam doubles results
- French Open Junior: 2R (2010)
- Wimbledon Junior: 2R (2011)
- US Open Junior: 2R (2010, 2011)

Team competitions
- Fed Cup: 9–2

Zarah Razafimahatratra (born 24 August 1994) is a retired Malagasy tennis player.

Razafimahatratra was Madagascar's top female tennis player. She won one singles title and five doubles titles on the ITF Women's Circuit.

In 2013, she made her debut for the Madagascar Fed Cup team. She had her maiden appearance against Cyprus in Moldova on 9 May, helping the team to a win following a decade of absence.

On the junior circuit, she achieved a career-high ranking of world No. 22, on 29 January 2012.

== Career ==
=== 2012 ===
Razafimahatratra began her 2012 season with back-to-back Grade-1 junior tournaments in South America, losing in the first round of both, the first being in Costa Rica and the second in Venezuela. In March, she headed to South Africa to play three consecutive Grade-2 tournaments in Potchefstroom. She reached the quarterfinals of all three tournaments. After this, Razafimahatratra travelled to Europe for the big junior clay court season, playing four tournaments, both Grade-1 and Grade- A, with her best result being a quarterfinal. She then lost in the second round of three consecutive junior tournaments.

As it turned out, these would be the last junior tournaments Razafimahatratra would play. In October, she began focusing on her professional career, and played a $25k tournament in Lagos, Nigeria, under a wildcard entry. In the first round, she defeated Kyra Shroff before another win over Viktoriya Tomova in the second round. In the quarterfinals, however, she met the top seed from Russia, Nina Bratchikova, and despite taking the first set, the eighteen-year-old was eventually defeated. In doubles, she reached the quarterfinals alongside Valeria Patiuk. The following week, Razafimahatratra played another $25k event in Lagos, but was forced to qualify. She did so, and after defeating Maria Sakkari in the first round lost to Lu Jiajing in the second. She reached the quarterfinal of the doubles tournament with Patiuk.

Zarah's final tournaments of the year were back-to-back 10k events in Potchefstroom, South Africa. She reached the semifinals of the first tournament before being blasted out by Chanel Simmonds, winning not a single game. In doubles, however, she reached the final alongside Lynn Kiro; they lost against Kim Grajdek and Keren Shlomo. In the second tournament in Potchefstroom, Zarah was crowned singles and doubles champion.

=== 2013 ===
Razafimahatratra's 2013 campaign began with four consecutive $10k tournaments in Sharm El Sheikh. In the first event, she lost a three-set match against eventual champion Adrijana Lekaj, but went on to win the doubles with Romanian Ilka Csöregi. The following week, she lost in the second round to the second seed, but once more lifted the doubles trophy with Csöregi. In the third tournament, however, she fared better in singles, reaching the semifinals without dropping a set, before being defeated by Darya Lebesheva.

== ITF finals ==
=== Singles (1–2) ===
Legend $25,000 tournaments $10,000 tournaments	Finals by surface Hard (1–0) Clay (0–2)

Outcome	No.	Date	Tournament	Surface	Opponent	Score
Winner	1.	15 December 2012	Potchefstroom, South Africa	Hard	(France) Estelle Cascino	7–6^{(5)}, 6–0
Runner-up	1.	17 November 2013	Oujda, Morocco	Clay	(France) Jade Suvrijn	6–4, 4–6, 3–6
Runner-up	2.	1 December 2013	Fes, Morocco	Clay	(France) Jade Suvrijn	5–7, 0–6

=== Doubles (5–2) ===
Legend $25,000 tournaments $10,000 tournaments	Finals by surface Hard (4–2) Clay (1–0)

Outcome	No.	Date	Tournament	Surface	Partner	Opponents	Score
Runner-up	1.	8 December 2012	Potchefstroom, South Africa	Hard	(South Africa) Lynn Kiro	(Germany) Kim-Alice Grajdek (Israel) Keren Shlomo	6–2, 4–6, [8–10]
Winner	1.	15 December 2012	Potchefstroom, South Africa	Hard	(South Africa) Lynn Kiro	(Germany) Kim-Alice Grajdek (Israel) Keren Shlomo	w/o
Winner	2.	3 March 2013	Sharm El Sheikh, Egypt	Hard	(Romania) Ilka Csoregi	(United Kingdom) Naomi Broady (Serbia) Ana Veselinović	7–5, 6–3
Winner	3.	10 March 2013	Sharm El Sheikh, Egypt	Hard	(Romania) Ilka Csoregi	(Russia) Alexandra Artamonova (Belarus) Darya Lebesheva	6–3, 6–4
Winner	4.	17 November 2013	Oujda, Morocco	Hard	(Morocco) Lina Qostal	(Australia) Alexandra Nancarrow (Spain) Olga Parres Azcoita	6–3, 7–5
Runner-up	2.	22 February 2014	Sharm El Sheikh, Egypt	Hard	(Netherlands) Demi Schuurs	(Montenegro) Ana Veselinović (Russia) Eugeniya Pashkova	2–6, 1–6
Winner	5.	12 June 2015	Antananarivo, Madagascar	Clay	(Madagascar) Sandra Andriamarosoa	(South Africa) Madrie Le Roux (Namibia) Liniques Theron	6–3, 6–2

== ITF Junior Circuit finals ==
Category G1
Category G2
Category G3
Category G4
Category G5

=== Singles (7–6) ===
Outcome	No.	Date	Tournament	Grade	Surface	Opponent	Score
Runner-up	1.	30 November 2008	Bujumbura, Burundi	G5	Clay	(Madagascar) Niriantsa Rasolomalala	3–6, 1–6
Runner-up	2.	12 December 2008	Nairobi, Kenya	G4	Clay	(Madagascar) Niriantsa Rasolomalala	4–6, 4–6
Winner	1.	6 August 2009	Windhoek, Namibia	G4	Hard	(Madagascar) Niriantsa Rasolomalala	7–6^{(7–2)}, 7–6^{(7–4)}
Runner-up	3.	12 August 2009	Gaborone, Botswana	G4	Hard	(South Africa) Sarah Ive	2–6, 6–4, 4–6
Runner-up	4.	6 December 2009	Kampala, Uganda	G4	Clay	(Madagascar) Niriantsa Rasolomalala	6–1, 4–6, 0–6
Winner	2.	10 December 2009	Nairobi, Kenya	G4	Clay	(Madagascar) Niriantsa Rasolomalala	6–1, 6–7^{(3–7)}, 6–1
Winner	3.	12 March 2010	Potchefstroom, South Africa	G2	Hard	(United Kingdom) Jennifer Ren	6–4, 6–1
Runner-up	5.	4 April 2010	Abuja, Nigeria	G2	Hard	(Tunisia) Ons Jabeur	6–1, 2–6, 6–7^{(2–7)}
Winner	4.	8 April 2010	Abuja, Nigeria	B2	Hard	(Tunisia) Nour Abbès	3–6, 6–3, 7–5
Runner-up	6.	11 March 2011	Potchefstroom, South Africa	G2	Hard	(Croatia) Donna Vekić	3–6, 4–6
Winner	5.	3 April 2011	Gaborone, Botswana	G2	Hard	(Tunisia) Nour Abbès	6–2, 6–2
Winner	6.	8 April 2011	Gaborone, Botswana	B2	Hard	(Tunisia) Nour Abbès	7–5, 6–2
Winner	7.	30 July 2011	Pretoria, South Africa	G4	Hard	(Namibia) Kerstin Gressmann	6–0, 6–0

=== Doubles (10–4) ===
Outcome	No.	Date	Tournament	Grade	Surface	Partner	Opponents	Score
Runner-up	1.	30 November 2008	Bujumbura, Burundi	G5	Clay	(Zimbabwe) Valeria Bhunu	(Egypt) Yasmin Ebada (Burundi) Ann-Sophie Rufyikiri	3–6, 3–6
Runner-up	2.	12 December 2008	Nairobi, Kenya	G4	Clay	(Zimbabwe) Valeria Bhunu	(Madagascar) Niriantsa Rasolomalala (South Africa) Kaylea Chana Sher	3–6, 7–5, 3–6
Runner-up	3.	26 July 2009	Windhoek, Namibia	G4	Hard	(Madagascar) Niriantsa Rasolomalala	(South Africa) Adri Lochner (South Africa) Mikayla Morkel-Brink	3–6, 6–4, [9–11]
Winner	1.	6 August 2009	Windhoek, Namibia	G4	Hard	(Madagascar) Niriantsa Rasolomalala	(South Africa) Sarah Ive (South Africa) Welma Luus	6–7^{(7–9)}, 7–6^{(7–3)}, [10–5]
Winner	2.	12 August 2009	Gaborone, Botswana	G4	Hard	(Madagascar) Niriantsa Rasolomalala	(United Kingdom) Laura Deigman (South Africa) Tracy Plant	6–1, 7–6^{(7–3)}
Winner	3.	28 November 2009	Kigali, Rwanda	G5	Clay	(Madagascar) Niriantsa Rasolomalala	(United Kingdom) Elliesa Ball (Egypt) Yasmin Ebada	6–3, 6–1
Winner	4.	6 December 2009	Kampala, Uganda	G4	Clay	(Madagascar) Niriantsa Rasolomalala	(South Africa) Natasha Fourouclas (South Africa) Tracy Plant	6–3, 6–4
Winner	5.	10 December 2009	Nairobi, Kenya	G4	Clay	(Madagascar) Niriantsa Rasolomalala	(Benin) Stephanie N'tcha (South Africa) Veruska Van Wyk	6–7^{(4–7)}, 6–4, [10–8]
Winner	6.	19 March 2010	Pretoria, South Africa	G2	Hard	(Madagascar) Niriantsa Rasolomalala	(Belgium) Ysaline Bonaventure (Romania) Ilinca Stoica	2–6, 6–4, [10–6]
Runner-up	4.	4 April 2010	Abuja, Nigeria	G2	Hard	(Madagascar) Niriantsa Rasolomalala	(Tunisia) Nour Abbès (Tunisia) Ons Jabeur	3–6, 3–6
Winner	7.	8 April 2010	Abuja, Nigeria	B2	Hard	(Madagascar) Niriantsa Rasolomalala	(Mauritius) Sohinee Ghosh (Burundi) Ann-Sophie Rufyikiri	7–6^{(8–6)}, 6–2
Winner	8.	30 July 2011	Pretoria, South Africa	G4	Hard	(South Africa) Jesse Norah Grace	(South Africa) Dane Joubert (Namibia) Carita Moolman	7–5, 6–2
Winner	9.	16 September 2011	Montreal, Canada	G3	Hard	(Ukraine) Ganna Poznikhirenko	(Canada) Gloria Liang (Canada) Erin Routliffe	6–2, 6–3
Winner	10.	17 June 2012	Offenbach, Germany	G1	Clay	(Romania) Ilka Csöregi	(Ukraine) Diana Bogoliy (Latvia) Jeļena Ostapenko	6–0, 3–6, [10–7]
