= 2015 Fed Cup Europe/Africa Zone Group I – Pool D =

Group D of the 2015 Fed Cup Europe/Africa Zone Group I was one of four pools in the Europe/Africa zone of the 2015 Fed Cup. Four teams competed in a round robin competition, with the top team and the bottom team proceeding to their respective sections of the play-offs: the top team played for advancement to the World Group II Play-offs, while the bottom team faced potential relegation to Group II.

== Standings ==
		(Belgium) BEL	(Croatia) CRO	(Israel) ISR	(Latvia) LAT	RR; W–L	Match; W–L	Set; W–L	Game; W–L	Standings
25	Belgium		1–2	3–0	3–0	2–1	7–2	15–5	106–63	2
31	Croatia	2–1		3–0	2–1	3–0	7–2	14–6	105–65	1
33	Israel	0–3	0–3		2–1	1–2	2–7	6–14	65–103	3
50	Latvia	0–3	1–2	1–2		0–3	2–7	5–15	61–106	4

== Round-robin ==
=== Belgium vs. Latvia ===
Belgium
3
Syma Sport and Events Centre, Budapest, Hungary
4 February 2015
Hard (indoors)

Latvia
0

			1	2	3
1	(Belgium) (Latvia)	Alison Van Uytvanck; Dārta-Elizabete Emuliņa	6; 1	6; 0
2	(Belgium) (Latvia)	Kirsten Flipkens; Jeļena Ostapenko	6; 2	4; 6	6; 3
3	(Belgium) (Latvia)	An-Sophie Mestach / Alison Van Uytvanck; Dārta-Elizabete Emuliņa / Jeļena Ostapenko	6; 0	7; 5

=== Croatia vs. Israel ===
Croatia
3
Syma Sport and Events Centre, Budapest, Hungary
4 February 2015
Hard (indoors)

Israel
0

			1	2	3
1	(Croatia) (Israel)	Ana Konjuh; Keren Shlomo	6; 3	6; 0
2	(Croatia) (Israel)	Donna Vekić; Julia Glushko	6; 1	6^{6} 7^{8}	7; 5
3	(Croatia) (Israel)	Darija Jurak / Ana Konjuh; Alona Pushkarevsky / Keren Shlomo	6; 0	6; 0

=== Belgium vs. Israel ===
Belgium
3
Syma Sport and Events Centre, Budapest, Hungary
5 February 2015
Hard (indoors)

Israel
0

			1	2	3
1	(Belgium) (Israel)	Alison Van Uytvanck; Alona Pushkarevsky	6; 0	6; 3
2	(Belgium) (Israel)	Yanina Wickmayer; Julia Glushko	6; 3	6; 2
3	(Belgium) (Israel)	An-Sophie Mestach / Alison Van Uytvanck; Julia Glushko / Shahar Pe'er	6; 1	6; 3

=== Croatia vs. Latvia ===
Croatia
2
Syma Sport and Events Centre, Budapest, Hungary
5 February 2015
Hard (indoors)

Latvia
1

			1	2	3
1	(Croatia) (Latvia)	Ana Konjuh; Dārta-Elizabete Emuliņa	6; 1	6; 0
2	(Croatia) (Latvia)	Donna Vekić; Jeļena Ostapenko	3; 6	1; 6
3	(Croatia) (Latvia)	Darija Jurak / Ana Konjuh; Diāna Marcinkēviča / Jeļena Ostapenko	6; 4	6; 3

=== Belgium vs. Croatia ===
Belgium
1
Syma Sport and Events Centre, Budapest, Hungary
6 February 2015
Hard (indoors)

Croatia
2

			1	2	3
1	(Belgium) (Croatia)	Alison Van Uytvanck; Ana Vrljić	6; 2	6; 4
2	(Belgium) (Croatia)	Kirsten Flipkens; Ana Konjuh	2; 6	6; 4	4; 6
3	(Belgium) (Croatia)	Kirsten Flipkens / Alison Van Uytvanck; Darija Jurak / Ana Konjuh	3; 6	2; 6

=== Israel vs. Latvia ===
Israel
2
Syma Sport and Events Centre, Budapest, Hungary
6 February 2015
Hard (indoors)

Latvia
1

			1	2	3
1	(Israel) (Latvia)	Julia Glushko; Jeļena Ostapenko	7; 5	6; 3
2	(Israel) (Latvia)	Shahar Pe'er; Diāna Marcinkēviča	6; 1	6; 1
3	(Israel) (Latvia)	Alona Pushkarevsky / Keren Shlomo; Jeļena Ostapenko / Dārta-Elizabete Emuliņa	3; 6	6; 2	3; 6
