= Ofri Lankri =

Israeli tennis player and coach

- Native name: עופרי לנקרי
- Country (sports): Israel
- Born: 6 July 1991 (age 35) Israel
- Plays: Left-handed
- Prize money: $24,785

Singles
- Career record: 101–72
- Career titles: 2 ITF
- Highest ranking: 545 (18 June 2012)

Doubles
- Career record: 49–44
- Career titles: 3 ITF
- Highest ranking: 586 (7 May 2012)

Team competitions
- Fed Cup: 1–1

Ofri Lankri (Hebrew: עופרי (עפרי) לנקרי; born 6 July 1991) is an Israeli former tennis player and current wheelchair tennis coach. During her playing career on the ITF Women's Circuit, she won two singles and three doubles titles, and had a career-high singles ranking of world No. 545. She also represented the Israel Fed Cup team, with whom she had a 1–1 win–loss record.

After retiring from competing, she began coaching in adaptive sports. She is the Israeli national men's wheelchair tennis team and the national quad team coach under the Israel Paralympic Committee, and is the only woman in Israel to lead a men's national sports team. She has been the long-term coach of Israeli Paralympic wheelchair tennis player Guy Sasson, who won the 2024 and 2025 French Open Quad Singles titles and won the bronze medal for Israel at the 2024 Summer Paralympics in Paris, and Israeli Paralympic wheelchair tennis player Sergei Lysov.

== Early life ==
Lankri was born and raised in Acre (Akko), Israel. She is the daughter of Dorit Lankri, a school teacher, and Shimon Lankri, who served as the mayor of Acre. Her father was born in Tiberias, Israel, to Moroccan-Jewish immigrants originally from the town of Bejad, Morocco.

== Tennis playing career ==
Lankri later grew up in Kiryat Bialik, Israel and began playing tennis at five years old before moving to the Israel Tennis & Education Centers in Ramat HaSharon at age 15. She served in the Israel Defense Forces as an outstanding athlete. As a junior competitor, she reached the singles final of an ITF youth tournament held in Porto Rafti, Greece.

She won her first senior ITF singles title in 2011 at a tournament in Havana, Cuba. In May 2012, she won her second ITF singles title in Ra'anana, Israel, defeating Despoina Vogasari of Greece in the final in straight sets. Lankri retired from regular professional circuit play in 2015 because she was unable to obtain continuous financial sponsorships to cover her expenses.

Lankri reached her career-high singles ranking of world No. 545 on 18 June 2012. Her highest doubles ranking was world No. 586, achieved on 7 May 2012. She also represented the Israel Fed Cup team, with whom she had a 1–1 win–loss record.

== Coaching career ==
Lankri transitioned into professional coaching with a focus on adaptive sports, youth, disabled children, and professional wheelchair tennis competitors. She was named the coach of the Israeli national men's wheelchair tennis team and the national quad team under the Israel Paralympic Committee, becoming the only woman in the country to lead a men's national sports team.

She has been the primary long-term coach for Israeli Paralympic wheelchair tennis champion Guy Sasson, managing his training out of the Israel ParaSport Center in Ramat Gan. Sasson won the 2024 and 2025 French Open Quad Singles titles, and won the bronze medal for Israel at the 2024 Summer Paralympics in Paris. Lankri also coaches Israeli Paralympic wheelchair tennis player Sergei Lysov.

In addition, she manages community outreach as the Head of Municipal and Government Sectors for the Israel Tennis & Education Centers Foundation.

== ITF finals ==
=== Singles: 8 (2–6) ===
Legend $100,000 tournaments $75,000 tournaments $50,000 tournaments $25,000 tournaments $10,000 tournaments	Finals by surface Hard (2–6) Clay (0–0) Grass (0–0) Carpet (0–0)

Result	No.	Date	Tournament	Surface	Opponent	Score
Loss	1.	11 September 2010	Larissa, Greece	Hard	(Russia) Alexandra Artamonova	6–4, 2–6, 5–7
Win	1.	3 July 2011	Havana, Cuba	Hard	(Japan) Makiho Kozawa	6–2, 6–4
Loss	2.	11 September 2011	Mytilene, Greece	Hard	(Israel) Deniz Khazaniuk	4–6, 5–7
Loss	3.	18 September 2011	Porto Rafti, Greece	Hard	(Mexico) Ximena Hermoso	6–4, 4–6, 2–6
Win	2.	26 May 2012	Ra'anana, Israel	Hard	(Greece) Despoina Vogasari	6–0, 6–1
Loss	4.	16 May 2015	Acre, Israel	Hard	(Israel) Deniz Khazaniuk	1–6, 3–6
Loss	5.	24 May 2015	Netanya, Israel	Hard	(Israel) Deniz Khazaniuk	4–6, 1–6
Loss	6.	13 June 2015	Ramat Gan, Israel	Hard	(Israel) Deniz Khazaniuk	5–7, 0–6

=== Doubles: 4 (3–1) ===
Legend $100,000 tournaments $75,000 tournaments $50,000 tournaments $25,000 tournaments $10,000 tournaments	Finals by surface Hard (3–1) Clay (0–0) Grass (0–0) Carpet (0–0)

Result	No.	Date	Tournament	Surface	Partner	Opponents	Score
Win	1.	28 May 2011	Ra'anana, Israel	Hard	(Israel) Valeria Patiuk	(Israel) Lee Or (Israel) Margarita-Greta Skripnik	6–2, 6–1
Win	2.	22 May 2015	Netanya, Israel	Hard	(Israel) Alona Pushkarevsky	(Uzbekistan) Vlada Ekshibarova (Israel) Deniz Khazaniuk	6–3, 6–3
Loss	1.	5 June 2015	Ramat Gan, Israel	Hard	(Israel) Alona Pushkarevsky	(Israel) Valeria Patiuk (Israel) Keren Shlomo	4–6, 2–6
Win	3.	11 June 2015	Ramat Gan, Israel	Hard	(Israel) Alona Pushkarevsky	(Israel) Valeria Patiuk (Israel) Keren Shlomo	6–3, 6–4

== ITF junior finals ==
Grand Slam
Category GA
Category G1
Category G2
Category G3
Category G4
Category G5

=== Singles (0–3) ===
Result	No.	Date	Tournament	Grade	Surface	Opponent	Score
Loss	1.	17 February 2007	Mexico City, Mexico	G5	Hard	(Indonesia) Nadia Frederika	3–6, 3–6
Loss	2.	20 September 2008	Bat Yam, Israel	G4	Hard	(Israel) Angelika Aliev	7–6^{(7–5)}, 0–6, 2–6
Loss	3.	27 September 2008	Netanya, Israel	G5	Hard	(Israel) Ofir Morag	0–6, 1–6

=== Doubles (0–1) ===
Result	No.	Date	Tournament	Grade	Surface	Partner	Opponents	Score
Loss	1.	10 May 2008	Beersheba, Israel	G4	Hard	(Israel) Ofir Morag	(Israel) Orian Ben Haim (Israel) Margarita-Greta Skripnik	3–6, 6–4, 2–6

== National representation ==
=== Fed Cup ===
Lankri made her Fed Cup debut for Israel in 2014, while the team was competing in the Europe/Africa Zone Group I.

==== Fed Cup (1–1) ====
Group membership World Group (0–0) World Group Play-off (0–0) World Group II (0–0) World Group II Play-off (0–0) Europe/Africa Group (1–1)	Matches by surface Hard (1–1) Clay (0–0) Grass (0–0) Carpet (0–0)	Matches by type Singles (1–0) Doubles (0–1)	Matches by setting Indoors (1–1) Outdoors (0–0)

==== Singles (1–0) ====
Edition	Stage	Date	Location	Against	Surface	Opponent	W/L	Score
2014 Fed Cup; Europe/Africa Zone Group I	Play-off	9 February 2014	Budapest, Hungary	Hungary	Hard	Szabina Szlavikovics	W	6–3, 3–6, 7–6^{(7–3)}

==== Doubles (0–1) ====
Edition	Stage	Date	Location	Against	Surface	Partner	Opponents	W/L	Score
2014 Fed Cup; Europe/Africa Zone Group I	Play-off	9 February 2014	Budapest, Hungary	Hungary	Hard	Keren Shlomo	Réka Luca Jani; Szabina Szlavikovics	L	3–6, 4–6

== See also ==
- Jews in Sports § Tennis
- Israel at the Paralympics
