= Deniz Khazaniuk =

Israeli tennis player (born 1994)

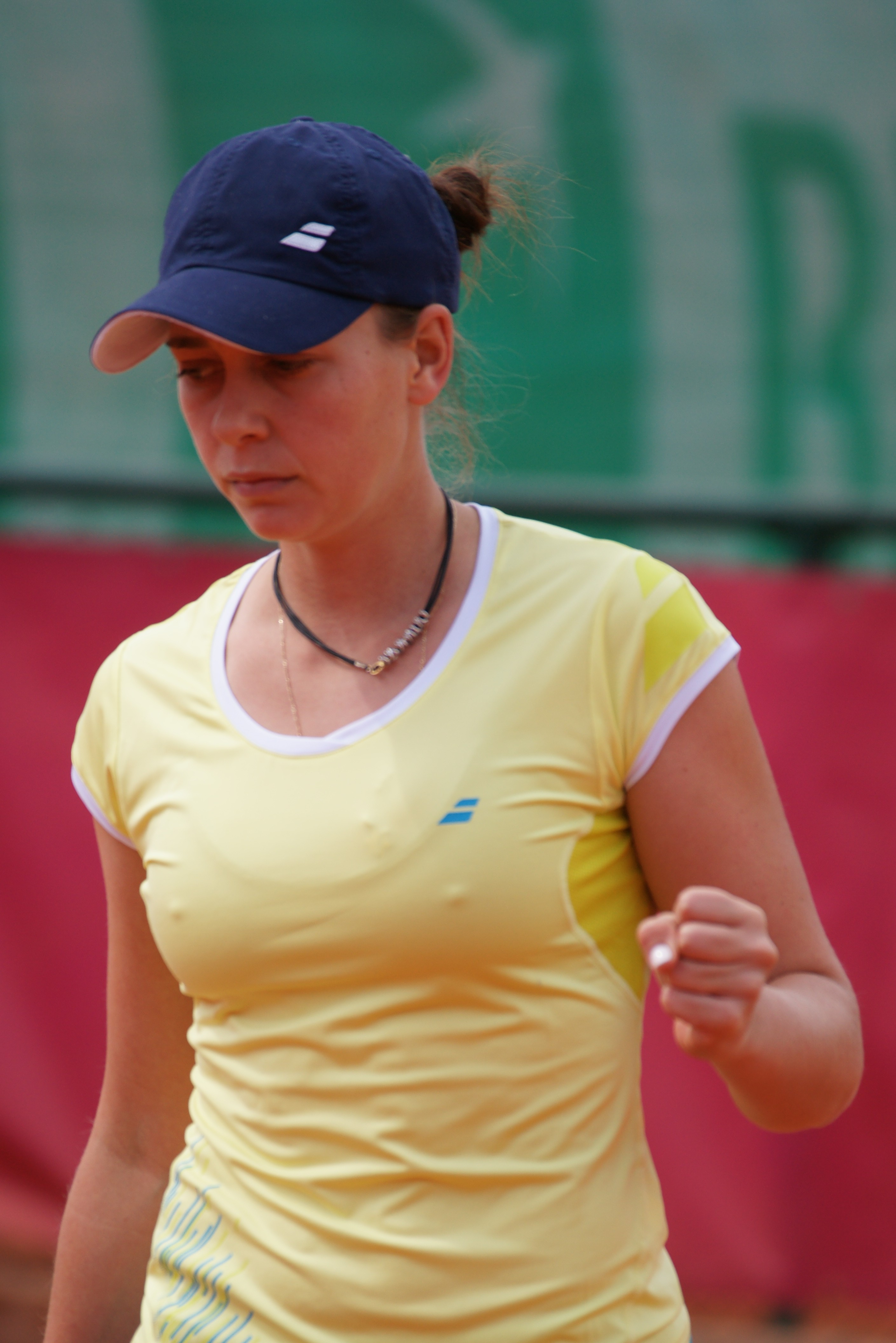
- Khazaniuk at the 2016 Open de Cagnes-sur-Mer
- Native name: דניז חזניוק
- Country (sports): Israel
- Residence: Netanya, Israel
- Born: 24 October 1994 (age 32) Ashkelon, Israel
- Height: 175 cm (5 ft 9 in)
- Retired: 2020 (last match)
- Plays: Right-handed (two-handed backhand)
- Prize money: $171,463

Singles
- Career record: 320–193
- Career titles: 21 ITF
- Highest ranking: No. 200 (11 June 2018)

Grand Slam singles results
- US Open: Q1 (2018)

Doubles
- Career record: 58–82
- Career titles: 3 ITF
- Highest ranking: No. 445 (16 June 2014)

Team competitions
- Fed Cup: 2–2
- Last updated on: 26 January 2023.

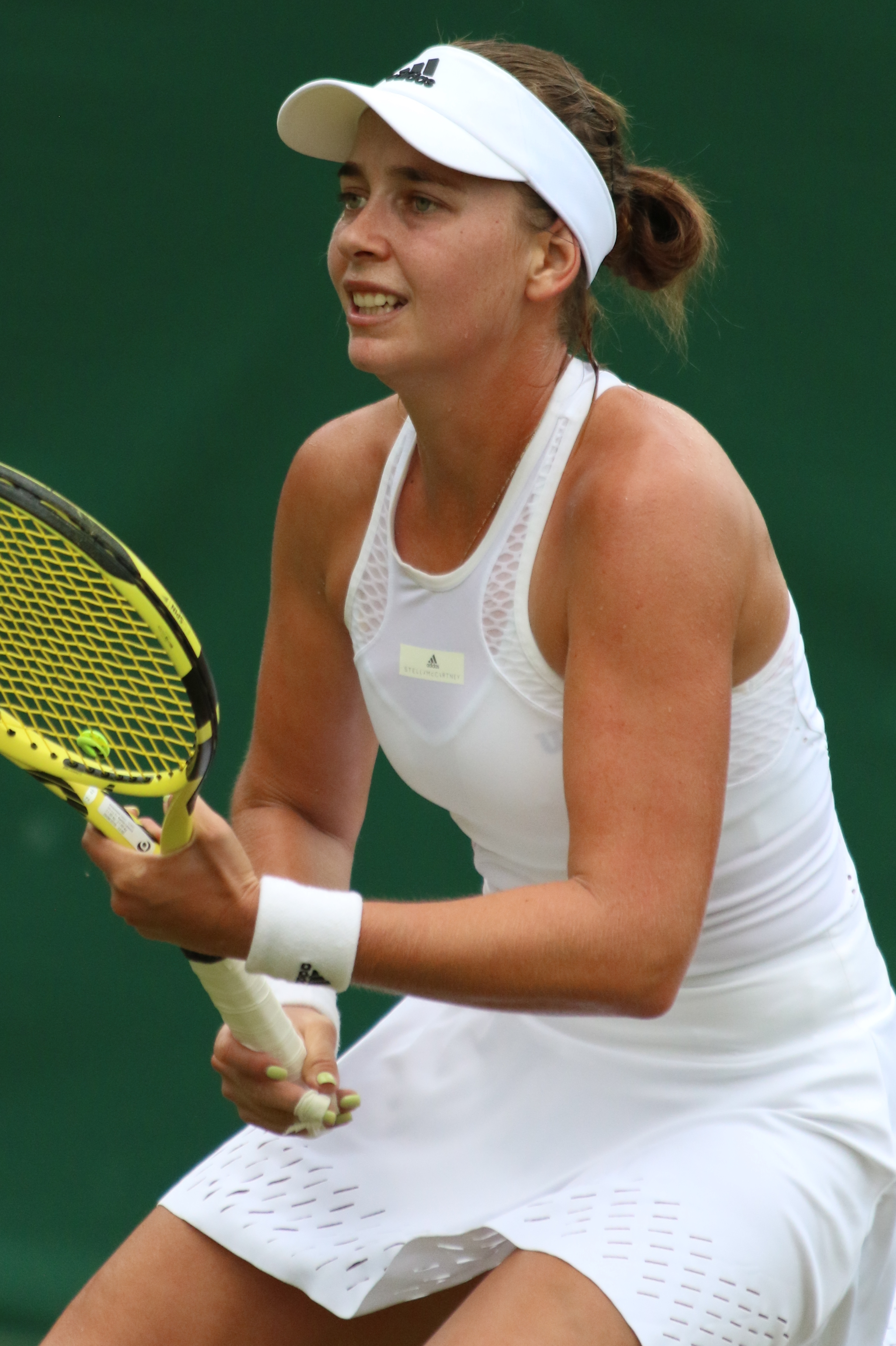
Khazaniuk at the 2019 Wimbledon Qualifying

Deniz Khazaniuk (Hebrew: דניז חזניוק; born 24 October 1994) is an Israeli former tennis player.

Khazaniuk has career-high WTA rankings of 200 in singles, achieved on 11 June 2018, and of 445 in doubles, achieved on 16 June 2014. She has won 21 singles titles and three doubles titles on the ITF Women's Circuit. In 2016, Khazaniuk won the Israeli Singles Championship.

== Biography ==
Khazaniuk was born in Ashkelon, Israel. Her father German Hazniuk is an orthopedist at the Hillel Yaffe Medical Center, and her mother Larissa who imports tennis equipment, both immigrated to Israel from Ukraine. When she was four years old the family moved to Netanya, Israel, where she lives. Her younger sister Stefany Khazaniuk is a former tennis player who currently works as a pitch-side reporter for Israel's Sport 5 Channel, and she has been in a relationship with Yair Netanyahu, son of the noted current Prime Minister of Israel.

In December 2016, Khazaniuk won the Israeli Singles Championship at 22 years of age, defeating Maya Tahan in the final.

In May 2019, she defeated world No. 87, Madison Brengle, at the ITF/USTA $100k in Charleston, South Carolina.

Playing for the Israel Fed Cup team, Khazaniuk has a win–loss record of 2–2, all in singles play.

== ITF Circuit finals ==
=== Singles: 35 (21 titles, 14 runner–ups) ===
Legend $60,000 tournaments $25,000 tournaments $15,000 tournaments $10,000 tournaments	Finals by surface Hard (19–11) Clay (1–2) Grass (0–0) Carpet (1–1)

Result	W–L	Date	Tournament	Tier	Surface	Opponent	Score
Win	1–0	Sep 2011	ITF Mytilene, Greece	10,000	Hard	(Israel) Ofri Lankri	6–4, 7–5
Win	2–0	Sep 2011	ITF Athens, Greece	10,000	Clay	(Greece) Maria Sakkari	1–6, 6–3, 6–3
Loss	2–1	Dec 2011	ITF Solapur, India	10,000	Hard	(Ukraine) Anna Shkudun	3–6, 6–4, 0–6
Win	3–1	Aug 2012	ITF Westende, Belgium	10,000	Hard	(France) Irina Ramialison	6–4, 2–6, 7–6^{(5)}
Loss	3–2	Oct 2012	ITF Acre, Israel	10,000	Hard	(Poland) Natalia Kołat	7–6^{(5)}, 4–6, 2–6
Win	4–2	Apr 2013	ITF Ashkelon, Israel	10,000	Hard	(Russia) Ksenia Kirillova	6–4, 6–1
Win	5–2	May 2013	ITF Ashkelon, Israel	10,000	Hard	(Russia) Ksenia Kirillova	6–2, 7–5
Win	6–2	May 2013	ITF Ramat HaSharon, Israel	10,000	Hard	(Israel) Ekaterina Tour	6–3, 6–3
Win	7–2	Jun 2013	ITF Ra'anana, Israel	10,000	Hard	(Israel) Ester Masuri	6–1, 6–1
Win	8–2	Jun 2013	ITF Herzliya, Israel	10,000	Hard	(Israel) Keren Shlomo	6–1, 6–4
Win	9–2	Aug 2013	ITF Wanfercée-Baulet, Belgium	10,000	Clay	(Ukraine) Oleksandra Korashvili	6–3, 7–6^{(6)}
Win	10–2	Mar 2014	ITF Heraklion, Greece	10,000	Hard	(France) Alix Collombon	7–6^{(4)}, 6–3
Loss	10–3	Apr 2014	ITF Antalya, Turkey	10,000	Hard	(Turkey) İpek Soylu	5–7, 6–4, 1–6
Loss	10–4	Jul 2014	ITF Imola, Italy	15,000	Carpet	(United Kingdom) Katy Dunne	1–6, 3–6
Loss	10–5	Dec 2014	ITF Tel Aviv, Israel	10,000	Hard	(Czech Republic) Barbora Štefková	2–6, 0–6
Loss	10–6	May 2015	ITF Ashkelon, Israel	10,000	Hard	(Israel) Saray Sterenbach	1–6, 4–6
Win	11–6	May 2015	ITF Acre, Israel	10,000	Hard	(Israel) Ofri Lankri	6–1, 6–3
Win	12–6	May 2015	ITF Netanya, Israel	10,000	Hard	(Israel) Ofri Lankri	6–4, 6–1
Loss	12–7	Jun 2015	ITF Ramat Gan, Israel	10,000	Hard	(France) Lou Brouleau	3–6, 6–2, 6–7^{(6)}
Win	13–7	Jun 2015	ITF Ramat Gan, Israel	10,000	Hard	(Israel) Ofri Lankri	7–5, 6–0
Win	14–7	Sep 2015	ITF Kiryat Gat, Israel	10,000	Hard	(Montenegro) Ana Veselinović	6–3, 6–0
Win	15–7	Sep 2015	ITF Tiberias, Israel	10,000	Hard	(Hungary) Naomi Totka	6–0, 7–5
Loss	15–8	Oct 2015	ITF Tel Aviv, Israel	10,000	Hard	(Russia) Olga Doroshina	6–7^{(4)}, 3–6
Loss	15–9	Oct 2015	ITF Ramat HaSharon, Israel	10,000	Hard	(Russia) Marta Paigina	4–6, 4–6
Win	16–9	Dec 2015	ITF Ramat Gan, Israel	10,000	Hard	(Russia) Olga Doroshina	7–6^{(6)}, 6–3
Loss	16–10	Sep 2016	Telavi Open, Georgia	25,000	Clay	(Russia) Veronika Kudermetova	5–7, 4–6
Loss	16–11	Sep 2016	ITF Bucha, Ukraine	25,000	Clay	(Russia) Anastasiya Komardina	4–6, 3–6
Win	17–11	Dec 2016	ITF Ramat Gan, Israel	10,000	Hard	(Czech Republic) Miriam Kolodziejová	7–5, 6–3
Loss	17–12	Dec 2016	ITF Ramat Gan, Israel	10,000	Hard	(Russia) Marta Paigina	2–6, 1–6
Win	18–12	Apr 2017	ITF Irapuato, Mexico	25,000	Hard	(Russia) Sofya Zhuk	w/o
Win	19–12	Oct 2017	Lagos Open, Nigeria	25,000	Hard	(Switzerland) Conny Perrin	4–6, 6–1, 6–3
Loss	19–13	Oct 2017	Lagos Open, Nigeria	25,000	Hard	(Switzerland) Conny Perrin	6–7^{(11)}, 3–6
Win	20–13	May 2018	ITF Osprey, United States	25,000	Clay	(United States) Sophie Chang	6–4, 4–6, [10–6]
Win	21–13	May 2019	ITF Óbidos, Portugal	25,000	Carpet	(Spain) Nuria Párrizas Díaz	6–1, 2–6, 6–1
Loss	21–14	Jul 2019	ITF Evansville, United States	25,000	Hard	(United States) Grace Min	6–7, 6–4, 5–7

=== Doubles (3 titles, 4 runner–ups) ===
Result	No.	Date	Tournament	Surface	Partner	Opponents	Score
Win	1.	26 April 2013	ITF Ashkelon, Israel	Hard	(Russia) Ksenia Kirillova	(Netherlands) Eva Wacanno (Germany) Alina Wessel	6–0, 6–4
Loss	2.	23 August 2013	ITF Wanfercée-Baulet, Belgium	Clay	(France) Amandine Hesse	(Argentina) Tatiana Búa (Chile) Daniela Seguel	4–6, 2–6
Win	3.	21 September 2013	ITF Antalya, Turkey	Hard	(Kyrgyzstan) Ksenia Palkina	(Philippines) Katharina Lehnert (Slovakia) Chantal Škamlová	6–7^{(5)}, 7–6^{(3)}, [10–8]
Loss	4.	22 May 2015	ITF Netanya, Israel	Hard	(Israel) Vlada Ekshibarova	(Israel) Ofri Lankri (Israel) Alona Pushkarevsky	3–6, 3–6
Win	5.	24 October 2015	ITF Ramat HaSharon, Israel	Hard	(Italy) Corinna Dentoni	(Israel) Sean Lodzki (Israel) Ester Masuri	6–2, 6–0
Loss	6.	21 February 2016	AK Ladies Open, Germany	Carpet (i)	(Russia) Maria Marfutina	(Belgium) Ysaline Bonaventure (Switzerland) Xenia Knoll	1–6, 4–6
Loss	7.	6 October 2018	Lagos Open, Nigeria	Hard	(France) Estelle Cascino	(Slovakia) Tereza Mihalíková (Bulgaria) Julia Terziyska	7–6^{(4)}, 2–6, [7–10]
