= Ana Veselinović =

Montenegrin tennis player

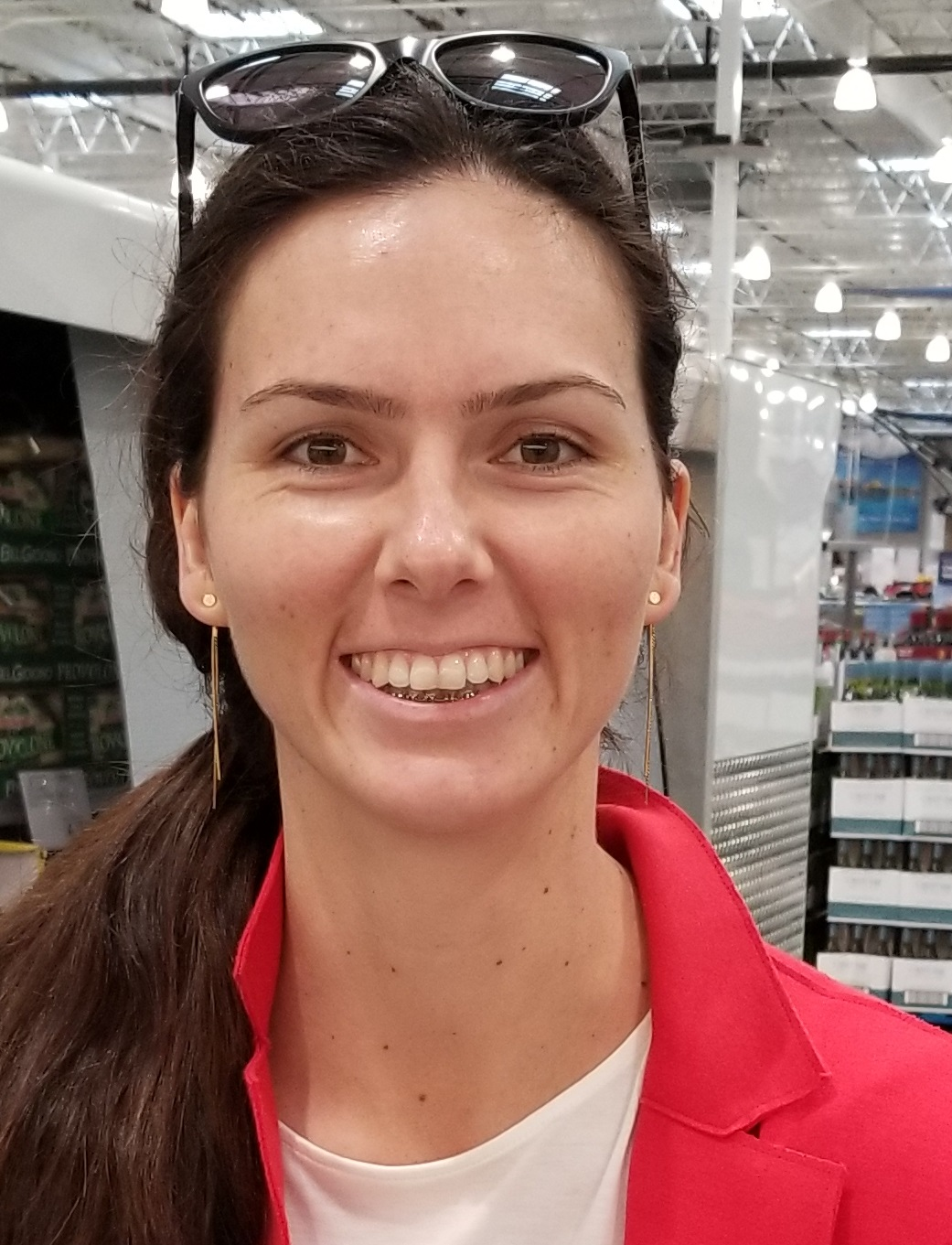
- Country (sports): Serbia (until April 2013); Montenegro (April 2013–present)
- Born: 22 February 1988 (age 38) Herceg Novi, SFR Yugoslavia
- Height: 1.73 m (5 ft 8 in)
- Prize money: $90,988

Singles
- Career record: 217–153
- Career titles: 6 ITF
- Highest ranking: No. 329 (10 September 2007)

Doubles
- Career record: 216–104
- Career titles: 31 ITF
- Highest ranking: No. 172 (6 August 2018)

Team competitions
- Fed Cup: 6–3

Ana Veselinović (Serbian Cyrillic: Ана Веселиновић, pronounced [âna ʋeselǐːnoʋitɕ, ǎː-]; born 22 February 1988) is a former professional tennis player from Montenegro.

She has won six singles titles and 31 doubles titles on the ITF Circuit. On 10 September 2007, she reached her best singles ranking of world No. 329. On 6 August 2018, she peaked at No. 172 in the WTA doubles rankings.

Veselinović, although born in Herceg Novi, represented Serbia at ITF events until April 2013, but then started playing under the Montenegrin flag after making her debut for the Montenegro Fed Cup team.

== ITF Circuit finals ==
=== Singles: 15 (6 titles, 9 runner-ups) ===
Legend $25,000 tournaments $15,000 tournaments $10,000 tournaments	Finals by surface Hard (4–7) Clay (2–0) Carpet (0–2)

Result	No.	Date	Tournament	Surface	Opponent	Score
Loss	1.	19 February 2006	ITF Buchen, Germany	Carpet (i)	(Poland) Anna Korzeniak	6–2, 5–7, 6–7^{(6)}
Win	1.	1 October 2006	ITF Podgorica, Montenegro	Clay	(Bulgaria) Dia Evtimova	6–4, 7–5
Win	2.	8 July 2007	ITF Prokuplje, Serbia	Clay	(Slovakia) Klaudia Boczová	6–4, 6–3
Win	3.	28 July 2007	ITF Calgary, Canada	Hard	(Canada) Sharon Fichman	6–2, 6–1
Win	4.	5 May 2013	ITF Sharm El Sheikh, Egypt	Hard	(Belgium) Klaartje Liebens	6–2, 6–3
Loss	2.	9 June 2013	ITF Ağrı, Turkey	Carpet	(Belarus) Ilona Kremen	4–6, 4–6
Win	5.	23 February 2014	ITF Sharm El Sheikh	Hard	(Austria) Barbara Haas	7–5, 5–7, 6–3
Loss	3.	28 September 2014	ITF Sharm El Sheikh	Hard	(United Kingdom) Naomi Cavaday	4–6, 4–6
Loss	4.	5 September 2015	ITF Kiryat Gat, Israel	Hard	(Israel) Deniz Khazaniuk	3–6, 0–6
Loss	5.	15 November 2015	ITF Sharm El Sheikh	Hard	(Kazakhstan) Kamila Kerimbayeva	6–3, 1–6, 2–6
Loss	6.	5 June 2016	ITF Kiryat Shmona, Israel	Hard	(Russia) Marta Paigina	3–6, 1–6
Win	6.	10 July 2016	ITF Buca, Turkey	Hard	(Venezuela) Aymet Uzcátegui	6–3, 6–4
Loss	7.	28 August 2016	ITF Sharm El Sheikh	Hard	(Slovakia) Tereza Mihalíková	6–2, 3–6, 4–6
Loss	8.	9 July 2017	ITF Amarante, Portugal	Hard	(China) Lu Jiajing	4–6, 4–6
Loss	9.	2 December 2017	ITF Indore, India	Hard	(Russia) Olga Doroshina	6–7^{(6)}, 2–6

=== Doubles: 42 (31 titles, 11 runner-ups) ===
Legend $100,000 tournaments $80,000 tournaments $60,000 tournaments $25,000 tournaments $15,000 tournaments $10,000 tournaments	Finals by surface Hard (28–8) Clay (3–3) Grass (0–0) Carpet (0–0)

Result	No.	Date	Tournament	Surface	Partner	Opponents	Score
Win	1.	2 July 2005	ITF Heerhugowaard, Netherlands	Clay	(Ukraine) Kristina Antoniychuk	(Netherlands) Marrit Boonstra (Netherlands) Nicole Thyssen	1–6, 6–2, 7–5
Loss	1.	15 July 2006	ITF Garching, Germany	Clay	(Austria) Janina Toljan	(Germany) Katharina Killi (Germany) Sarah Raab	5–7, 5–7
Win	2.	21 October 2006	ITF Dubrovnik, Croatia	Clay	(Serbia) Teodora Mirčić	(Serbia) Karolina Jovanović (Slovenia) Polona Reberšak	6–4, 7–5
Win	3.	1 December 2006	ITF Tel Aviv, Israel	Hard	(Austria) Eva-Maria Hoch	(Netherlands) Marrit Boonstra (Netherlands) Renée Reinhard	6–4, 7–6^{(5)}
Loss	2.	18 May 2007	ITF Antalya, Turkey	Clay	(United Kingdom) Anna Fitzpatrick	(Germany) Korina Perkovic (Turkey) İpek Şenoğlu	6–1, 1–6, 4–6
Loss	3.	10 June 2007	ITF Grado, Italy	Clay	(Australia) Christina Wheeler	(Italy) Stefania Chieppa (Belarus) Darya Kustova	5–7, 3–6
Win	4.	7 July 2007	ITF Prokuplje, Serbia	Clay	(Argentina) María Irigoyen	(Netherlands) Kika Hogendoorn (Belgium) Davinia Lobbinger	6–1, 7–6^{(3)}
Win	5.	27 July 2007	ITF Calgary, Canada	Hard	(United Kingdom) Anna Fitzpatrick	(Argentina) Soledad Esperón (Argentina) Agustina Lepore	6–4, 6–3
Loss	4.	29 September 2007	Nottingham, England	Hard	(United Kingdom) Anna Fitzpatrick	(Finland) Emma Laine (Belgium) Caroline Maes	6–3, 6–7^{(4)}, [6–10]
Win	6.	23 February 2008	Clearwater, United States	Hard	(United Kingdom) Anna Fitzpatrick	(Chinese Taipei) Chan Chin-wei (Japan) Seiko Okamoto	6–2, 3–6, [10–6]
Win	7.	1 March 2008	Fort Walton Beach, United States	Hard	(United Kingdom) Anna Fitzpatrick	(Netherlands) Nicole Thyssen (Netherlands) Pauline Wong	6–3, 7–6^{(4)}
Loss	5.	2 March 2013	Sharm El Sheikh, Egypt	Hard	(United Kingdom) Naomi Broady	(Romania) Ilka Csöregi (Madagascar) Zarah Razafimahatratra	5–7, 3–6
Win	8.	11 May 2013	Sharm El Sheikh	Hard	(Italy) Carolina Petrelli	(Ukraine) Anastasia Kharchenko (Russia) Anna Morgina	3–6, 7–5, [10–7]
Win	9.	18 May 2013	Sharm El Sheikh	Hard	(United Kingdom) Anna Fitzpatrick	(Turkey) Başak Eraydın (Turkey) Melis Sezer	2–6, 6–4, [10–3]
Win	10.	15 February 2014	Sharm El Sheikh	Hard	(Russia) Eugeniya Pashkova	(Italy) Giulia Bruzzone (Romania) Elena-Teodora Cadar	2–6, 6–0, [10–4]
Win	11.	22 February 2014	Sharm El Sheikh	Hard	(Russia) Eugeniya Pashkova	(Madagascar) Zarah Razafimahatratra (Netherlands) Demi Schuurs	6–2, 6–1
Win	12.	15 March 2014	Sharm El Sheikh	Hard	(Serbia) Nina Stojanović	(Bosnia and Herzegovina) Dea Herdželaš (India) Natasha Palha	6–0, 4–6, [10–6]
Win	13.	22 March 2014	Sharm El Sheikh	Hard	(Russia) Eugeniya Pashkova	(Finland) Emma Laine (United Kingdom) Emily Webley-Smith	6–3, 7–5
Win	14.	20 June 2014	Astana, Kazakhstan	Hard	(Georgia (country)) Sofia Kvatsabaia	(Uzbekistan) Albina Khabibulina (Kazakhstan) Ekaterina Kylueva	7–6^{(5)}, 7–6^{(3)}
Win	15.	4 September 2015	Kiryat Gat, Israel	Hard	(United Kingdom) Francesca Stephenson	(Israel) May Kimhi (Israel) Maya Tahan	6–3, 7–5
Loss	6.	11 September 2015	Tiberias, Israel	Hard	(United Kingdom) Francesca Stephenson	(Germany) Katharina Hering (Hungary) Naomi Totka	4–6, 6–7^{(5)}
Loss	7.	10 October 2015	Sharm El Sheikh	Hard	(Egypt) Ola Abou Zekry	(United Kingdom) Freya Christie (United States) Alexandra Riley	6–7^{(9)}, 6–3, [8–10]
Win	16.	14 November 2015	Sharm El Sheikh	Hard	(Kazakhstan) Kamila Kerimbayeva	(Romania) Ana Bianca Mihăilă (Belgium) Hélène Scholsen	w/o
Win	17.	27 May 2016	Ramat Gan, Israel	Hard	(Hungary) Naomi Totka	(Israel) Shelly Krolitzky (Israel) Alona Pushkarevsky	2–6, 6–3, [10–6]
Win	18.	4 June 2016	Kiryat Shmona, Israel	Hard	(Hungary) Naomi Totka	(Israel) Vlada Ekshibarova (Israel) Keren Shlomo	6–1, 1–6, [10–6]
Win	19.	2 July 2016	Antalya, Turkey	Hard	(Turkey) Melis Sezer	(Israel) Vlada Ekshibarova (Ukraine) Alyona Sotnikova	6–3, 6–4
Win	20.	9 July 2016	Izmir, Turkey	Hard	(Israel) Vlada Ekshibarova	(Russia) Daria Lodikova (Sweden) Anette Munozova	6–3, 6–3
Win	21.	16 July 2016	Sharm El Sheikh	Hard	(Sweden) Jacqueline Cabaj Awad	(Ukraine) Kateryna Sliusar (India) Dhruthi Tatachar Venugopal	6–4, 6–1
Win	22.	13 August 2016	Sharm El Sheikh	Hard	(India) Sharmada Balu	(Georgia (country)) Mariam Bolkvadze (Romania) Ana Bianca Mihăilă	4–6, 7–6^{(2)}, [10–8]
Win	23.	20 August 2016	Sharm El Sheikh	Hard	(Greece) Despina Papamichail	(Turkey) Berfu Cengiz (India) Dhruthi Tatachar Venugopal	7–6^{(4)}, 1–6, [10–5]
Win	24.	16 December 2016	Pune, India	Hard	(Indonesia) Beatrice Gumulya	(Thailand) Kamonwan Buayam (United Kingdom) Katy Dunne	6–4, 6–3
Win	25.	8 April 2017	Sharm El Sheikh	Hard	(China) You Xiaodi	(Egypt) Ola Abou Zekry (Egypt) Sandra Samir	6–3, 7–5
Win	26.	15 April 2017	Sharm El Sheikh	Hard	(China) You Xiaodi	(Romania) Laura-Ioana Andrei (Austria) Melanie Klaffner	2–6, 7–5, [13–11]
Loss	8.	28 April 2017	ITF Qarshi, Uzbekistan	Hard	(Uzbekistan) Nigina Abduraimova	(Russia) Olga Doroshina (Russia) Polina Monova	5–7, 2–6
Win	27.	17 September 2017	ITF Redding, United States	Hard	(United Kingdom) Daneika Borthwick	(United Kingdom) Harriet Dart (United States) Maria Sanchez	6–3, 6–4
Loss	9.	22 September 2017	ITF Lubbock, United States	Hard	(India) Karman Kaur Thandi	(United States) Victoria Duval (Russia) Alisa Kleybanova	6–2, 4–6, [8–10]
Win	28.	14 October 2017	ITF Lagos, Nigeria	Hard	(Turkey) Ayla Aksu	(Switzerland) Conny Perrin (Ukraine) Valeriya Strakhova	6–4, 6–2
Win	29.	18 November 2017	ITF Dakar, Senegal	Hard	(Russia) Yana Sizikova	(Greece) Valentini Grammatikopoulou (Netherlands) Rosalie van der Hoek	6–3, 6–3
Loss	10.	15 December 2017	ITF Pune, India	Hard	(United Kingdom) Samantha Murray	(Indonesia) Jessy Rompies (Thailand) Varunya Wongteanchai	4–6, 2–6
Loss	11.	9 March 2018	ITF Bhopal, India	Hard	(Slovakia) Tereza Mihalíková	(India) Kanika Vaidya (Netherlands) Rosalie van der Hoek	2–1 ret.
Win	30.	16 March 2018	ITF Gwalior, India	Hard	(Russia) Yana Sizikova	(United Kingdom) Freya Christie (Uzbekistan) Albina Khabibulina	6–3, 2–6, [10–5]
Win	31.	14 December 2018	ITF Pune	Hard	(Indonesia) Beatrice Gumulya	(Canada) Sharon Fichman (Russia) Valeria Savinykh	7–6^{(4)}, 1–6, [11–9]
