= Kim Grajdek =

German tennis player

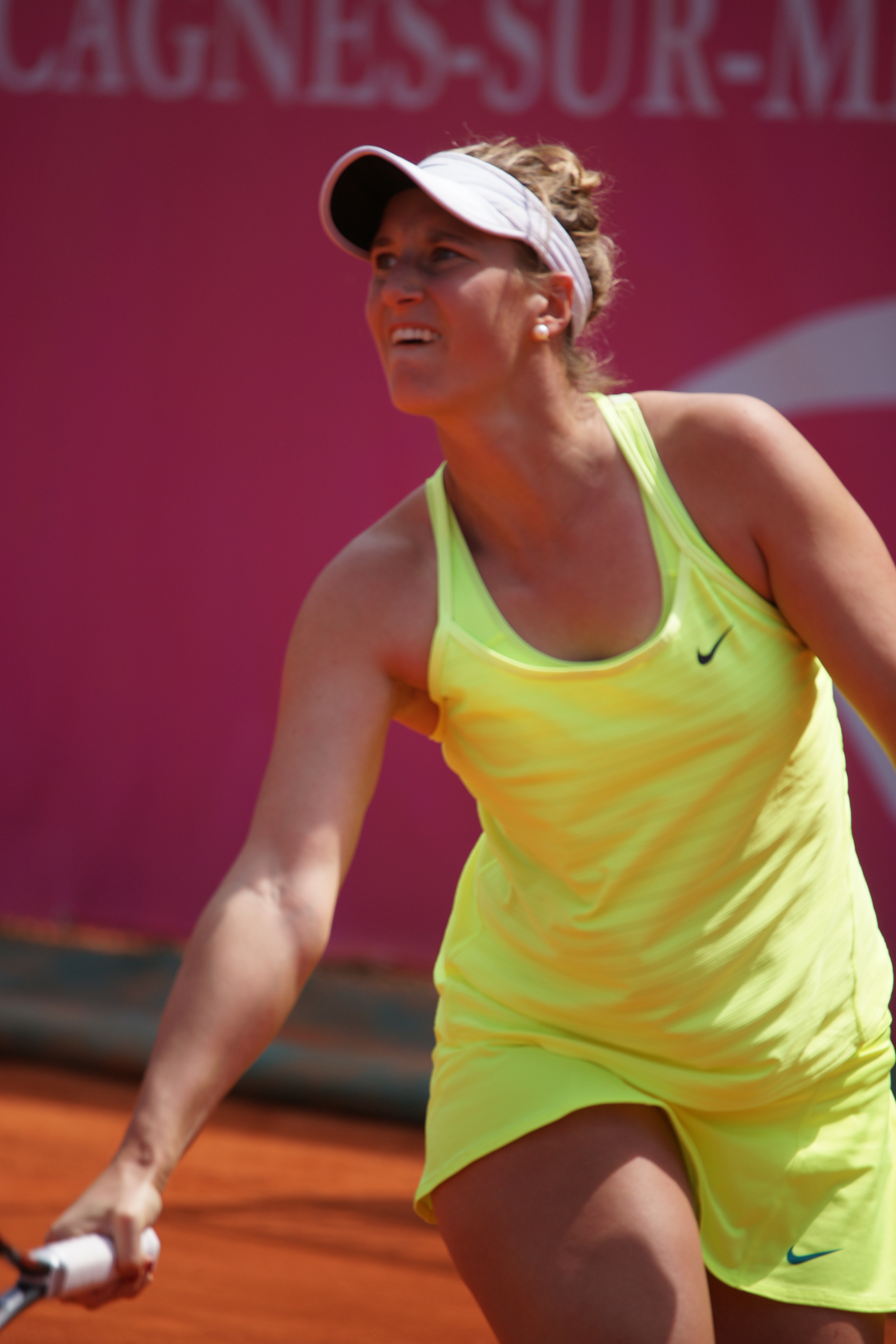
- Grajdek at the 2016 Open de Cagnes-sur-Mer
- Full name: Kim-Alice Grajdek
- Country (sports): Germany
- Born: 30 March 1991 (age 35) Langenhagen, Germany
- Height: 1.75 m (5 ft 9 in)
- Plays: Right (two-handed backhand)
- Prize money: $64,182

Singles
- Career record: 144–217
- Career titles: 1 ITF
- Highest ranking: No. 405 (21 November 2011)

Doubles
- Career record: 131–130
- Career titles: 8 ITF
- Highest ranking: No. 332 (5 August 2013)

Kim-Alice Grajdek (born 30 March 1991) is a German former tennis player.

In her career, Grajdek won one singles title and eight doubles titles on the ITF Women's Circuit. On 21 November 2011, she reached her best singles ranking of world No. 405. On 5 August 2013, she peaked at No. 332 in the doubles rankings.

== ITF finals ==
=== Singles (1–1) ===
Legend $50,000 tournaments $25,000 tournaments $10,000 tournaments	Finals by surface Hard (1–1) Clay (0–0) Carpet (0–0)

Result	Date	Tier	Tournament	Surface	Opponent	Score
Loss	31 January 2011	10,000	Coimbra, Portugal	Hard	(Spain) Rocío de la Torre Sánchez	5–7, 0–4 ret.
Win	8 September 2014	10,000	Antalya, Turkey	Hard	(Japan) Kanami Tsuji	6–3, 6–4

=== Doubles (8–15) ===
Legend $100,000 tournaments $75,000 tournaments $50,000 tournaments $25,000 tournaments $15,000 tournaments $10,000 tournaments	Finals by surface Hard (6–5) Clay (2–7) Grass (0–0) Carpet (0–3)

Result	No.	Date	Tier	Tournament	Surface	Partner	Opponents	Score
Runner-up	1.	25 January 2010	10,000	Kaarst, Germany	Carpet (i)	(Germany) Syna Kayser	(Germany) Nicola Geuer (Germany) Lena-Marie Hofmann	4–6, 4–6
Runner-up	2.	14 June 2010	10,000	Montemor-o-Novo, Portugal	Hard	(Bulgaria) Julia Stamatova	(Canada) Mélanie Gloria (Mexico) Daniela Múñoz Gallegos	6–7^{(3)}, 1–6
Runner-up	3.	12 July 2010	10,000	Cáceres, Spain	Hard	(Spain) Georgina García Pérez	(Australia) Jade Hopper (France) Victoria Larrière	5–7, 4–6
Winner	1.	20 September 2010	10,000	Thessaloniki, Greece	Clay	(Russia) Anastasia Mukhametova	(Israel) Chen Astrogo (Israel) Keren Shlomo	6–2, 6–3
Winner	2.	31 January 2011	10,000	Coimbra, Portugal	Hard	(Poland) Barbara Sobaszkiewicz	(Norway) Ulrikke Eikeri (Spain) Arabela Ferández Rabener	7–6^{(1)}, 6–3
Winner	3.	2 May 2011	10,000	Petroupoli, Greece	Hard	(Czech Republic) Zuzana Linhová	(Russia) Alexandra Artamonova (Latvia) Diāna Marcinkēviča	3–6, 6–3, [10–6]
Runner-up	4.	23 May 2011	10,000	Paros, Greece	Carpet	(Ukraine) Anastasia Kharchenko	(Serbia) Tamara Čurović (Ukraine) Yuliya Lysa	6–3, 0–6, [9–11]
Winner	4.	3 October 2011	10,000	Madrid, Spain	Hard	(Poland) Justyna Jegiołka	(Argentina) Vanesa Furlanetto (Argentina) Aranza Salut	6–3, 6–3
Runner-up	5.	13 August 2012	10,000	Ratingen, Germany	Clay	(Poland) Sylwia Zagórska	(Georgia (country)) Ekaterine Gorgodze (Georgia (country)) Sofia Kvatsabaia	3–6, 4–6
Runner-up	6.	20 August 2012	10,000	Braunschweig, Germany	Clay	(Poland) Sylwia Zagórska	(Bosnia and Herzegovina) Jasmina Kajtazovič (Russia) Anna Smolina	1–6, 3–6
Winner	5.	3 December 2012	10,000	Potchefstroom, South Africa	Hard	(Israel) Keren Shlomo	(South Africa) Lynn Kiro (Madagascar) Zarah Razafimahatratra	2–6, 6–4, [10–8]
Runner-up	7.	10 December 2012	10,000	Potchefstroom, South Africa	Hard	(Israel) Keren Shlomo	(South Africa) Lynn Kiro (Madagascar) Zarah Razafimahatratra	w/o
Winner	6.	18 March 2013	10,000	Sharm El Sheikh, Egypt	Hard	(Poland) Sylwia Zagórska	(Spain) Beatriz Morales Hernández (Serbia) Andjela Novčić	6–2, 6–1
Runner-up	8.	24 February 2014	10,000	Palma Nova, Spain	Clay	(Netherlands) Monique Zuur	(Spain) Inés Ferrer Suárez (Spain) Olga Parres Azcoitia	2–6, 6–7^{(3)}
Runner-up	9.	10 March 2014	10,000	Pula, Italy	Clay	(Slovenia) Maša Zec Peškirič	(Italy) Martina Caregaro (Italy) Anna Floris	3–6, 7–5, [8–10]
Winner	7.	5 May 2014	10,000	Båstad, Sweden	Clay	(Greece) Maria Sakkari	(Bosnia and Herzegovina) Dea Herdželaš (Switzerland) Conny Perrin	7–5, 6–4
Runner-up	10.	23 February 2015	10,000	Palma Nova, Spain	Clay	(Lithuania) Akvilė Paražinskaitė	(Romania) Irina Bara (Hungary) Ágnes Bukta	2–6, 4–6
Runner-up	11.	2 March 2015	10,000	Antalya, Turkey	Clay	(Australia) Alexandra Nancarrow	(Sweden) Cornelia Lister (United Kingdom) Tara Moore	6–7^{(0)}, 5–7
Runner-up	12.	9 March 2015	10,000	Antalya, Turkey	Clay	(Slovakia) Lenka Juríková	(Sweden) Cornelia Lister (Belarus) Sviatlana Pirazhenka	6–7^{(6)}, 4–6
Runner-up	13.	6 April 2015	15,000	León, Mexico	Hard	(Japan) Mayo Hibi	(Brazil) Maria Fernanda Alves (United States) Danielle Lao	7–5, 6–7^{(5)}, [4–10]
Runner-up	14.	24 August 2015	10,000	Antalya, Turkey	Hard	(Israel) Keren Shlomo	(Ukraine) Alona Fomina (Germany) Alina Wessel	3–6, 3–6
Winner	8.	2 November 2015	10,000	Oslo, Norway	Hard (i)	(Russia) Ekaterina Yashina	(Norway) Astrid Brune Olsen (Norway) Malene Helgø	6–2, 6–3
Runner-up	15.	16 November 2015	25,000	Zawada, Poland	Carpet (i)	(Russia) Ekaterina Yashina	(Romania) Mihaela Buzărnescu (Poland) Justyna Jegiołka	2–6, 3–6
