= Szabina Szlavikovics =

Hungarian tennis player

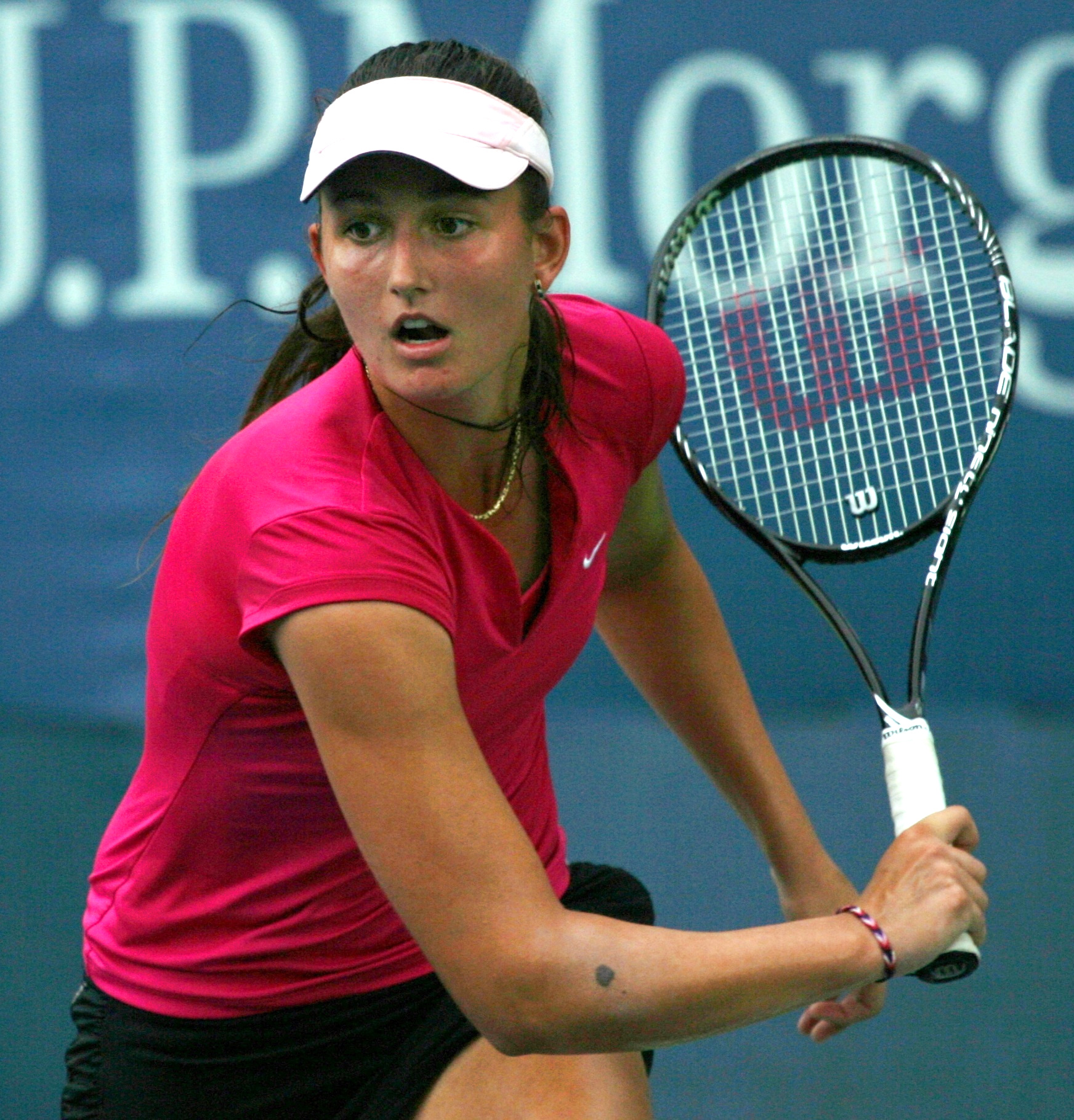
- Szlavikovics at the 2013 US Open
- Country (sports): Hungary
- Born: 5 September 1995 (age 29); Baja, Hungary
- Prize money: $28,270

Singles
- Career record: 107–117
- Highest ranking: No. 525 (6 October 2014)

Grand Slam singles results
- French Open Junior: Q1 (2013)
- Wimbledon Junior: Q2 (2013)
- US Open Junior: 1R (2012, 2013)

Doubles
- Career record: 64–54
- Career titles: 4 ITF
- Highest ranking: No. 575 (16 October 2017)

Team competitions
- Fed Cup: 1–1

Szabina Szlavikovics (born 5 September 1995) is a Hungarian former tennis player.

Szlavikovics won four doubles titles on the ITF Circuit in her career. On 6 October 2014, she reached her best singles ranking of world No. 525. On 16 October 2017, she peaked at No. 575 in the WTA doubles rankings.

Playing for Hungary in the Billie Jean King Cup, Szlavikovics has a win–loss record of 1–1.

== ITF Circuit finals ==
=== Singles: 2 (0–2) ===
Legend $25,000 tournaments $10,000 tournaments	Finals by surface Hard (0–0) Clay (0–2)

Result	No.	Date	Tournament	Tier	Surface	Opponent	Score
Loss	1.	Oct 2013	IZF Pereira, Colombia	10,000	Clay	(Netherlands) Anna Katalina Alzate Esmurzaeva	1–6, 2–6
Loss	2.	Jun 2015	ITF Telavi, Georgia	10,000	Clay	(Slovenia) Tamara Zidanšek	3–6, 3–6

=== Doubles: 9 (4–5) ===
Legend $25,000 tournaments $10/15,000 tournaments	Finals by surface Hard (1–3) Clay (3–2)

Result	No.	Date	Tier	Tournament	Surface	Partner	Opponents	Score
Loss	1.	14 October 2013	10,000	ITF Pereira, Colombia	Clay	(Colombia) Sofía Múnera Sánchez	(Ecuador) Doménica González (Chile) Camila Silva	4–6, 2–6
Loss	2.	21 April 2014	10,000	ITF Antalya, Turkey	Hard	(Mexico) Camila Fuentes	(Mexico) Victoria Rodríguez (Mexico) Marcela Zacarías	1–6, 1–6
Win	1.	1 June 2015	10,000	ITF Bol, Croatia	Clay	(Hungary) Rebeka Stolmár	(Bosnia and Herzegovina) Dea Herdželaš (Slovakia) Barbara Kötelešová	7–6^{(5)}, 6–0
Win	2.	22 June 2015	10,000	ITF Telavi, Georgia	Clay	(Hungary) Rebeka Stolmár	(Italy) Federica Arcidiacono (Italy) Martina Spigarelli	6–2, 6–2
Loss	3.	16 November 2015	10,000	ITF Port El Kantaoui, Tunisia	Hard	(Hungary) Bianka Békefi	(Russia) Margarita Lazareva (Germany) Julia Wachaczyk	4–6, 4–6
Win	3.	1 August 2016	10,000	ITF Vinkovci, Croatia	Clay	(Hungary) Bianka Békefi	(Croatia) Tea Faber (Croatia) Ana Savić	6–4, 6–4
Win	4.	31 October 2016	10,000	ITF Sharm El Sheikh, Egypt	Hard	(Hungary) Bianka Békefi	(Russia) Sofia Dmitrieva (Russia) Anna Pribylova	6–4, 6–4
Loss	4.	7 November 2016	10,000	ITF Sharm El Sheikh, Egypt	Hard	(Hungary) Bianka Békefi	(Bulgaria) Julia Terziyska (Germany) Julia Wachaczyk	4–6, 6–4, [1–10]
Loss	5.	30 June 2017	15,000	ITF Tarvisio, Italy	Clay	(Argentina) Carla Lucero	(Italy) Federica Di Sarra (Switzerland) Lisa Sabino	0–6, 3–6

== Fed Cup participation ==
=== Singles ===
Edition	Stage	Date	Location	Against	Surface	Opponent	W/L	Score
2014 Fed Cup; Europe/Africa Zone Group I	P/O	9 February 2014	Budapest, Hungary	Israel	Hard (i)	(Israel) Ofri Lankri	L	3–6, 6–3, 6–7^{(3)}

=== Doubles ===
Edition	Stage	Date	Location	Against	Surface	Partner	Opponents	W/L	Score
2014 Fed Cup; Europe/Africa Zone Group I	P/O	9 February 2014	Budapest, Hungary	Israel	Hard (i)	(Hungary) Réka Luca Jani	(Israel) Ofri Lankri (Israel) Keren Shlomo	W	6–3, 6–4
