= Vlada Ekshibarova =

Israeli-Uzbekistani tennis player

- Native name: ולדה אקשיברובה
- Country (sports): Uzbekistan (2003–2016; Sep 2024–); Israel (2016–2024)
- Born: 14 March 1989 (age 37) Tashkent, Uzbek SSR, USSR
- Retired: October 2025 (last match played)
- Plays: Right-handed (two-handed backhand)
- Coach: Arne Thoms
- Prize money: US$ 139,305

Singles
- Career record: 446–299
- Career titles: 8 ITF
- Highest ranking: No. 352 (14 July 2008)

Doubles
- Career record: 189–181
- Career titles: 15 ITF
- Highest ranking: No. 319 (20 June 2016)

Team competitions
- Fed Cup: 1–14
- Last updated on: 15 June 2026.

Vlada Ekshibarova (Hebrew: ולדה אקשיברובה; born 14 March 1989) is an Israeli-Uzbekistani former tennis player.

She has won eight singles and 15 doubles titles on the ITF Circuit. On 14 July 2008, Ekshibarova reached her best singles ranking of world No. 352. On 20 June 2016, she peaked at No. 319 in the doubles rankings.

== Career ==
Ekshibarova made her WTA Tour debut at the 2004 Tashkent Open, having received a wildcard into the doubles draw with Dilyara Saidkhodjayeva, but they lost to Ekaterina Bychkova and Maria Goloviznina in the first round. Playing for Uzbekistan in the Fed Cup, Ekshibarova had a win–loss record of 1–9.

In 2016, she became an Israeli citizen. In June 2016, Ekshibarova decided to play for Israel instead of Uzbekistan.

In December 2017, Ekshibarova won the Israel Tennis Women's Singles Championship, beating Deniz Khazaniuk 7–6, 5–4 (ret.) in the final, and also won the Doubles Championship, partnering with Maya Tahan.

In 2018, she played for the Israel Fed Cup team, going 0–3 in singles. In Fed Cup, she has an overall win–loss record of 1–14.

In September 2024, she started competing for Uzbekistan again.

== ITF Circuit finals ==
=== Singles: 20 (8 titles, 12 runner-ups) ===
Legend $25,000 tournaments $10/15,000 tournaments	Finals by surface Hard (6–8) Clay (2–4)

Result	W–L	Date	Tournament	Tier	Surface	Opponent	Score
Win	1–0	Jul 2006	ITF Bangkok, Thailand	10,000	Hard	(Thailand) Nungnadda Wannasuk	6–4, 7–6^{(7)}
Win	2–0	Jul 2007	ITF Khon Kaen, Thailand	10,000	Hard	(India) Isha Lakhani	2–6, 6–2, 6–3
Loss	2–1	Nov 2007	ITF Manila, Philippines	10,000	Clay	(Switzerland) Nicole Riner	6–4, 3–6, 4–6
Win	3–1	Nov 2010	ITF Antalya, Turkey	10,000	Hard	(Romania) Andreea Mitu	6–2, 4–6, 6–2
Win	4–1	Feb 2011	ITF Aurangabad, India	10,000	Clay	(Thailand) Varatchaya Wongteanchai	6–1, 6–4
Loss	4–2	Feb 2011	ITF Mumbai, India	10,000	Hard	(Thailand) Varatchaya Wongteanchai	6–4, 3–6, 4–6
Loss	4–3	Apr 2011	ITF Almaty, Kazakhstan	10,000	Hard (i)	(Russia) Nadezda Gorbachkova	6–2, 4–6, 3–6
Win	5–3	Jun 2014	ITF Astana, Kazakhstan	10,000	Hard (i)	(Georgia (country)) Sofia Kvatsabaia	7–5, 6–3
Win	6–3	Jul 2014	ITF Astana, Kazakhstan	10,000	Hard	(Georgia (country)) Mariam Bolkvadze	7–5, 6–3
Loss	6–4	May 2016	ITF Ramat Gan, Israel	10,000	Hard	(Russia) Polina Monova	6–4, 1–6, 4–6
Win	7–4	Jun 2016	ITF Acre, Israel	10,000	Hard	(Russia) Marta Paigina	6–3, 6–4
Loss	7–5	Sep 2016	ITF Ashkelon, Israel	10,000	Hard	(France) Jennifer Zerbone	7–6, 3–6, 6–2
Loss	7–6	Oct 2016	ITF Tiberias, Israel	10,000	Hard	(Turkey) Melis Sezer	3–6, 3–6
Loss	7–7	Oct 2016	ITF Ramat HaSharon, Israel	10,000	Hard	(Russia) Marta Paigina	1–6, 4–6
Loss	7–8	Jun 2017	ITF Antalya, Turkey	15,000	Clay	(Colombia) Emiliana Arango	2–6, 3–6
Win	8–8	Aug 2017	ITF Istanbul, Turkey	15,000	Clay	(Germany) Dana Kremer	6–2, 6–1
Loss	8–9	Nov 2017	ITF Heraklion, Greece	15,000	Clay	(Switzerland) Lisa Sabino	6–2, 2–6, 1–6
Loss	8–10	Jun 2018	ITF Kaltenkirchen, Germany	15,000	Clay	(Germany) Jule Niemeier	5–7, 2–6
Loss	8–11	Dec 2018	ITF Antalya	15,000	Hard	(Russia) Evgeniya Burdina	4–6, 6–3, 5–7
Loss	8–12	May 2023	ITF Vierumäki, Finland	15,000	Hard	(Austria) Tamara Kostic	0–6, 5–7

=== Doubles: 35 (15 titles, 20 runner-ups) ===
Legend $25,000 tournaments $10/15,000 tournaments	Finals by surface Hard (14–14) Clay (1–6)

Result	W–L	Date	Tournament	TIer	Surface	Partner	Opponents	Score
Loss	0–1	Oct 2010	ITF Antalya, Turkey	10,000	Clay	(Poland) Barbara Sobaszkiewicz	(Romania) Cristina Dinu (Romania) Ionela-Andreea Iova	6–1, 2–6, [7–10]
Loss	0–2	May 2015	ITF Shymkent, Kazakhstan	10,000	Clay	(Russia) Daria Lodikova	(Uzbekistan) Albina Khabibulina (Uzbekistan) Polina Merenkova	3–6, 1–6
Loss	0–3	May 2015	ITF Acre, Israel	10,000	Hard	(Russia) Daria Lodikova	(Belgium) Hélène Scholsen (Belarus) Sadafmoh Tolibova	1–6, 1–6
Loss	0–4	May 2015	ITF Netanya, Israel	10,000	Hard	(Israel) Deniz Khazaniuk	(Israel) Ofri Lankri (Israel) Alona Pushkarevsky	3–6, 3–6
Loss	0–5	Jun 2015	Fergana Challenger, Uzbekistan	25,000	Hard	(India) Natasha Palha	(India) Sharmada Balu (Slovenia) Tadeja Majerič	5–7, 3–6
Win	1–5	Oct 2015	ITF Tel Aviv, Israel	10,000	Hard	(Russia) Olga Doroshina	(United Kingdom) Lucy Brown (France) Amandine Cazeaux	4–6, 6–4, [10–8]
Win	2–5	Nov 2015	ITF Heraklion, Greece	10,000	Hard	(Greece) Eleni Christofi	(Switzerland) Karin Kennel (Bulgaria) Viktoriya Tomova	4–6, 6–3, [10–1]
Loss	2–6	Nov 2015	ITF Heraklion, Greece	10,000	Hard	(Thailand) Helen De Cesare	(Switzerland) Karin Kennel (Bulgaria) Viktoriya Tomova	2–6, 4–6
Win	3–6	Nov 2015	ITF Ramat Gan, Israel	10,000	Hard	(Russia) Olga Doroshina	(United States) Alexandra Morozova (Czech Republic) Barbora Štefková	6–2, 6–2
Loss	3–7	Dec 2015	ITF Ramat Gan, Israel	10,000	Hard	(Russia) Daria Lodikova	(United States) Alexandra Morozova (Czech Republic) Barbora Štefková	2–6, 5–7
Loss	3–8	Apr 2016	ITF Heraklion, Greece	10,000	Hard	(Austria) Janina Toljan	(Russia) Victoria Kan (Ukraine) Alyona Sotnikova	1–6, 2–6
Win	4–8	May 2016	ITF Ramat Gan, Israel	10,000	Hard	(Hungary) Naomi Totka	(Russia) Yuliya Kalabina (Russia) Polina Monova	6–2, 6–1
Loss	4–9	Jun 2016	ITF Kiryat Shmona, Israel	10,000	Hard	(Israel) Keren Shlomo	(Hungary) Naomi Totka (Montenegro) Ana Veselinović	1–6, 6–1, [6–10]
Win	5–9	Jun 2016	ITF Acre, Israel	10,000	Hard	(Hungary) Naomi Totka	(Germany) Christina Shakovets (Ukraine) Veronika Stotyka	6–0, 3–6, [10–6]
Loss	5–10	Jun 2016	ITF Antalya, Turkey	10,000	Hard	(Ukraine) Alyona Sotnikova	(Turkey) Melis Sezer (Montenegro) Ana Veselinović	3–6, 4–6
Win	6–10	Jul 2016	ITF Buca, Turkey	10,000	Hard	(Montenegro) Ana Veselinović	(Russia) Daria Lodikova (Sweden) Anette Munozova	6–3, 6–3
Win	7–10	Sep 2016	ITF Ashkelon, Israel	10,000	Hard	(United States) Madeleine Kobelt	(Israel) Alona Pushkarevsky (Israel) Keren Shlomo	6–0, 3–6, [10–8]
Loss	7–11	Sep 2016	ITF Kiryat Gat, Israel	10,000	Hard	(Turkey) Melis Sezer	(Russia) Ekaterina Kazionova (United States) Madeleine Kobelt	6–7^{(5)}, 3–6
Win	8–11	Oct 2016	ITF Tiberias, Israel	10,000	Hard	(Turkey) Melis Sezer	(Russia) Ekaterina Kazionova (United States) Madeleine Kobelt	6–1, 6–3
Loss	8–12	Nov 2016	ITF Heraklion, Greece	10,000	Hard	(Belgium) Steffi Distelmans	(Netherlands) Nina Kruijer (Netherlands) Suzan Lamens	2–6, 6–4, [8–10]
Loss	8–13	Nov 2016	ITF Heraklion, Greece	10,000	Hard	(Belgium) Steffi Distelmans	(Belgium) Michaela Boev (Cambodia) Andrea Ka	4–6, 4–6
Win	9–13	Nov 2016	ITF Heraklion, Greece	10,000	Hard	(Romania) Raluca Șerban	(Belgium) Michaela Boev (Italy) Cristiana Ferrando	6–4, 7–6^{(4)}
Win	10–13	Dec 2016	ITF Ramat Gan, Israel	10,000	Hard	(Russia) Ekaterina Yashina	(Romania) Daiana Negreanu (Israel) Keren Shlomo	6–2, 7–6^{(4)}
Win	11–13	Dec 2016	ITF Ramat Gan, Israel	10,000	Hard	(Russia) Ekaterina Yashina	(Russia) Sofia Dmitrieva (Russia) Anna Pribylova	6–4, 6–3
Loss	11–14	Apr 2017	ITF Istanbul, Turkey	15,000	Hard (i)	(Greece) Eleni Daniilidou	(Russia) Ekaterina Kazionova (Russia) Elena Rybakina	1–6, 3–6
Win	12–14	May 2017	ITF Acre, Israel	15,000	Hard	(Greece) Despina Papamichail	(Israel) Shelly Krolitzky (Israel) Maya Tahan	6–4, 6–3
Win	13–14	Jun 2018	ITF Tel Aviv, Israel	15,000	Hard	(Romania) Elena-Teodora Cadar	(Israel) Shahar Biran (Czech Republic) Laetitia Pulchartová	6–3, 3–6, [10–6]
Loss	13–15	Jun 2018	ITF Kaltenkirchen, Germany	15,000	Clay	(Belarus) Sviatlana Pirazhenka	(Germany) Anna Gabric (Germany) Katharina Gerlach	2–6, 7–5, [8–10]
Win	14–15	Sep 2018	ITF Almaty, Kazakhstan	15,000	Clay	(Ukraine) Maryna Chernyshova	(Uzbekistan) Albina Khabibulina (Kyrgyzstan) Ksenia Palkina	7–6^{(3)}, 6–2
Loss	14–16	Jan 2019	ITF Antalya, Turkey	15,000	Clay	(Bulgaria) Julia Stamatova	(Japan) Kanako Morisaki (Japan) Ayaka Okuno	2–6, 2–6
Loss	14–17	Feb 2019	ITF Antalya, Turkey	15,000	Clay	(Ukraine) Maryna Chernyshova	(Turkey) Cemre Anil (Romania) Oana Georgeta Simion	2–6, 4–6
Win	15–17	Mar 2019	ITF Tel Aviv, Israel	15,000	Hard	(Russia) Daria Kruzhkova	(Netherlands) Merel Hoedt (Czech Republic) Anna Sisková	6–3, 6–2
Loss	15–18	Sep 2024	ITF Madrid, Spain	W15	Hard	(United Kingdom) Emma Wilson	(Switzerland) Jenny Dürst (Republic of Ireland) Celine Simunyu	4–6, 4–6
Loss	15–19	Mar 2025	ITF Alaminos, Cyprus	W15	Hard	(Ukraine) Anastasiia Firman	(Czech Republic) Linda Ševčíková (Romania) Oana Georgeta Simion	5–7, 3–6
Loss	15–20	May 2025	ITF Estepona, Spain	W15	Hard	(Belgium) Clara Vlasselaer	(Netherlands) Joy de Zeeuw (Slovakia) Viktória Morvayová	6–4, 1–6, [5–10]
