= 2014 Fed Cup Europe/Africa Zone Group I – play-offs =

International tennis competition play-offs

The playoffs of the 2014 Fed Cup Europe/Africa Zone Group I were the final stages of the Group I zonal competition involving teams from Europe and Africa. Using the positions determined in their pools, the sixteen teams faced off to determine their placing in the 2014 Fed Cup Europe/Africa Zone Group I. The top two teams advanced to World Group II play-offs, and the bottom two teams were relegated to the Europe/Africa Zone Group II.

== Pool results ==
| Placing | Pool A | Pool B | Pool C | Pool D |
|---|---|---|---|---|
| 1 | Netherlands | Romania | Ukraine | Belarus |
| 2 | Belgium | Hungary | Israel | Portugal |
| 3 | Croatia | Great Britain | Austria | Turkey |
| 4 | Luxembourg | Latvia | Slovenia | Bulgaria |

== Promotional play-offs ==
The first placed teams of each pool were drawn in head-to-head rounds. The winner of each round advanced to the World Group II play-offs.

=== Netherlands vs. Belarus ===
Netherlands
2
Syma Sport and Events Centre, Budapest, Hungary
9 February 2014
Hard (indoors)

Belarus
0

| | | | 1 | 2 | 3 |
|---|---|---|---|---|---|---|
| 1 | (Netherlands) (Belarus) | Richèl Hogenkamp; Aliaksandra Sasnovich | 6; 3 | 6; 4 |
| 2 | (Netherlands) (Belarus) | Kiki Bertens; Olga Govortsova | 7^{7} 6^{5} | 6; 2 |
| 3 | (Netherlands) (Belarus) | Kiki Bertens / Michaëlla Krajicek; Olga Govortsova / Aliaksandra Sasnovich | | | | not played |

=== Romania vs. Ukraine ===
Romania
2
Syma Sport and Events Centre, Budapest, Hungary
9 February 2014
Hard (indoors)

Ukraine
0

| | | | 1 | 2 | 3 |
|---|---|---|---|---|---|---|
| 1 | (Romania) (Ukraine) | Sorana Cîrstea; Olga Savchuk | 6; 3 | 6; 0 |
| 2 | (Romania) (Ukraine) | Simona Halep; Elina Svitolina | 6; 3 | 7; 5 |
| 3 | (Romania) (Ukraine) | Irina-Camelia Begu / Monica Niculescu; Lyudmyla Kichenok / Olga Savchuk | | | | not played |

== 5th to 8th play-offs ==
The second placed teams of each pool were drawn in head-to-head rounds to find the equal fifth and seventh placed teams.

=== Belgium vs. Portugal ===
Belgium
2
Syma Sport and Events Centre, Budapest, Hungary
9 February 2014
Hard (indoors)

Portugal
1

| | | | 1 | 2 | 3 |
|---|---|---|---|---|---|
| 1 | (Belgium) (Portugal) | An-Sophie Mestach; Bárbara Luz | 2; 6 | 6; 0 | 6; 2 |
| 2 | (Belgium) (Portugal) | Yanina Wickmayer; Michelle Larcher de Brito | 6^{5} 7^{7} | 3; 6 |
| 3 | (Belgium) (Portugal) | Ysaline Bonaventure / An-Sophie Mestach; Michelle Larcher de Brito / Bárbara Luz | 7^{7} 6^{3} | 6; 0 |

=== Hungary vs. Israel ===
Hungary
2
Syma Sport and Events Centre, Budapest, Hungary
9 February 2014
Hard (indoors)

Israel
1

| | | | 1 | 2 | 3 |
|---|---|---|---|---|---|
| 1 | (Hungary) (Israel) | Szabina Szlavikovics; Ofri Lankri | 3; 6 | 6; 3 | 6^{3} 7^{7} |
| 2 | (Hungary) (Israel) | Réka-Luca Jani; Keren Shlomo | 6; 4 | 6; 3 |
| 3 | (Hungary) (Israel) | Réka-Luca Jani / Szabina Szlavikovics; Ofri Lankri / Keren Shlomo | 6; 3 | 6; 4 |

== 9th to 12th play-offs ==
The third placed teams of each pool were drawn in head-to-head rounds to find the equal ninth and the eleventh placed teams.

=== Croatia vs. Turkey ===
Croatia
2
Syma Sport and Events Centre, Budapest, Hungary
9 February 2014
Hard (indoors)

Turkey
1

| | | | 1 | 2 | 3 |
|---|---|---|---|---|---|
| 1 | (Croatia) (Turkey) | Tereza Mrdeža; İpek Soylu | 4; 6 | 6; 1 | 0; 6 |
| 2 | (Croatia) (Turkey) | Donna Vekić; Melis Sezer | 6; 2 | 6; 1 |
| 3 | (Croatia) (Turkey) | Darija Jurak / Tereza Mrdeža; Çağla Büyükakçay / İpek Soylu | 7^{7} 6^{4} | 4; 6 | 6; 3 |

=== Great Britain vs. Austria ===
Great Britain
2
Syma Sport and Events Centre, Budapest, Hungary
9 February 2014
Hard (indoors)

Austria
0

| | | | 1 | 2 | 3 |
|---|---|---|---|---|---|---|
| 1 | (United Kingdom) (Austria) | Tara Moore; Tamira Paszek | 6; 2 | 6; 4 |
| 2 | (United Kingdom) (Austria) | Heather Watson; Yvonne Meusburger | 6; 4 | 6; 2 |
| 3 | (United Kingdom) (Austria) | Tara Moore / Jocelyn Rae; Yvonne Meusburger / Tamira Paszek | | | | not played |

== Relegation play-offs ==
The last placed teams of each pool were drawn in head-to-head rounds. The loser of each round was relegated to the Europe/Africa Zone Group II in 2015.

=== Luxembourg vs. Bulgaria ===
Luxembourg
0
Syma Sport and Events Centre, Budapest, Hungary
9 February 2014
Hard (indoors)

Bulgaria
2

| | | | 1 | 2 | 3 |
|---|---|---|---|---|---|---|
| 1 | (Luxembourg) (Bulgaria) | Claudine Schaul; Isabella Shinikova | 2; 6 | 3; 6 |
| 2 | (Luxembourg) (Bulgaria) | Anne Kremer; Elitsa Kostova | 3; 6 | 7^{9} 6^{7} | 6^{7} 7^{9} |
| 3 | (Luxembourg) (Bulgaria) | Anne Kremer / Claudine Schaul; Elitsa Kostova / Viktoriya Tomova | | | | not played |

=== Latvia vs. Slovenia ===
Latvia
2
Syma Sport and Events Centre, Budapest, Hungary
9 February 2014
Hard (indoors)

Slovenia
0

| | | | 1 | 2 | 3 |
|---|---|---|---|---|---|---|
| 1 | (Latvia) (Slovenia) | Jeļena Ostapenko; Dalila Jakupović | 6; 3 | 7^{11} 6^{9} |
| 2 | (Latvia) (Slovenia) | Diāna Marcinkēviča; Maša Zec Peškirič | 6; 0 | 6; 0 |
| 3 | (Latvia) (Slovenia) | Diāna Marcinkēviča / Jeļena Ostapenko; Dalila Jakupović / Andreja Klepač | | | | not played |

== Final placements ==
| Placing | Teams | |
| Promoted | Netherlands | Romania |
| Third | Belarus | Ukraine |
| Fifth | Belgium | Hungary |
| Seventh | Portugal | Israel |
| Ninth | Croatia | Great Britain |
| Eleventh | Turkey | Austria |
| Thirteenth | Bulgaria | Latvia |
| Relegated | Luxembourg | Slovenia |

- Netherlands and Romania advanced to World Group II play-offs.
- Luxembourg and Slovenia were relegated to Europe/Africa Group II in 2015.
