= Dārta-Elizabete Emuliņa =

Latvian tennis player

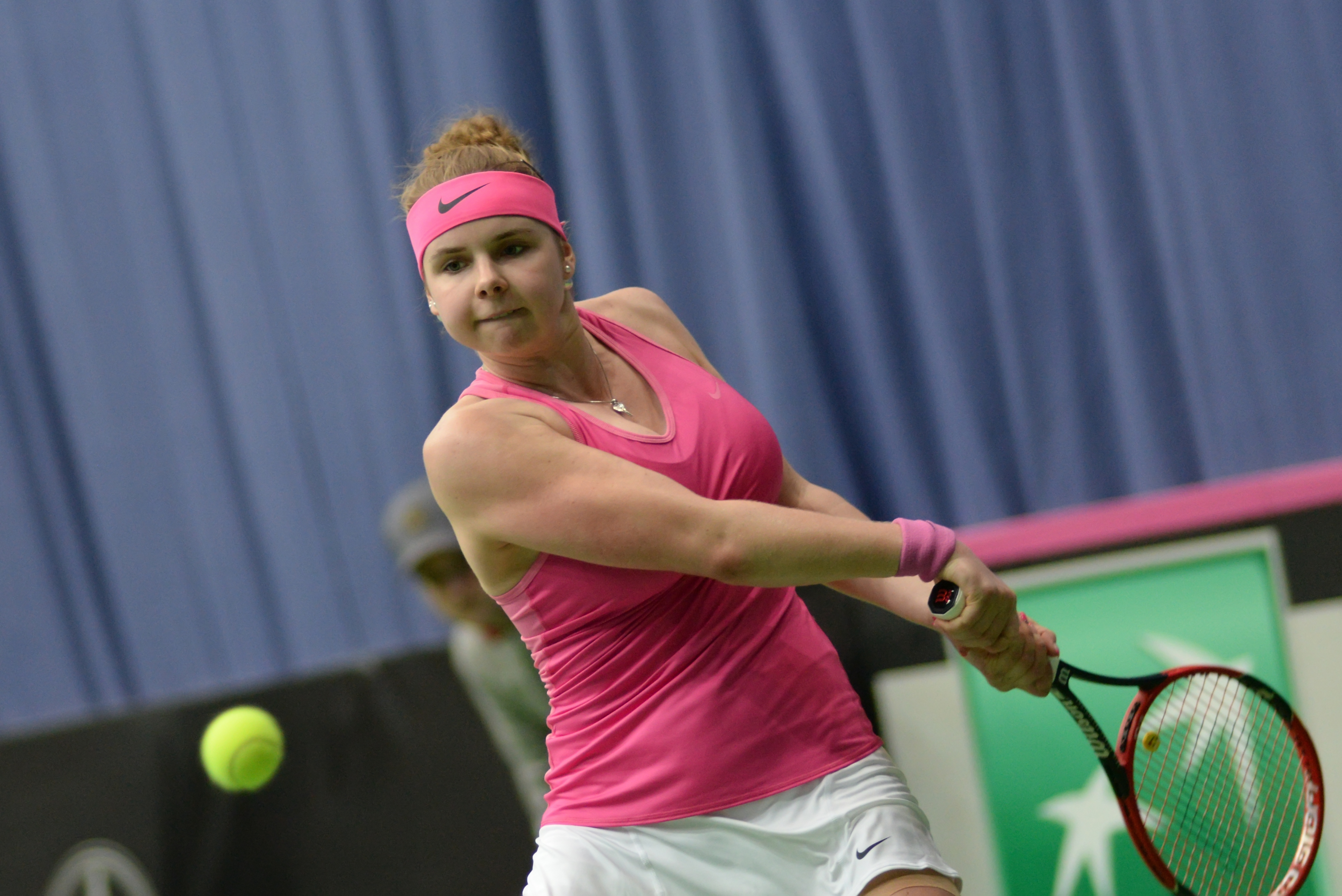
- Emuliņa at the 2015 Fed Cup
- Country (sports): Latvia
- Born: 5 June 1997 (age 27); Riga, Latvia
- Plays: Right-handed (two-handed backhand)

Team competitions
- Fed Cup: 2–4
- Last updated on: 30 November 2016.

Dārta-Elizabete Emuliņa (born 5 June 1997) is a Latvian tennis player. She is a member of the Latvia Fed Cup team and has a win-loss record in the Fed Cup of 2–4.
