= Valeria Patiuk =

Israeli tennis player

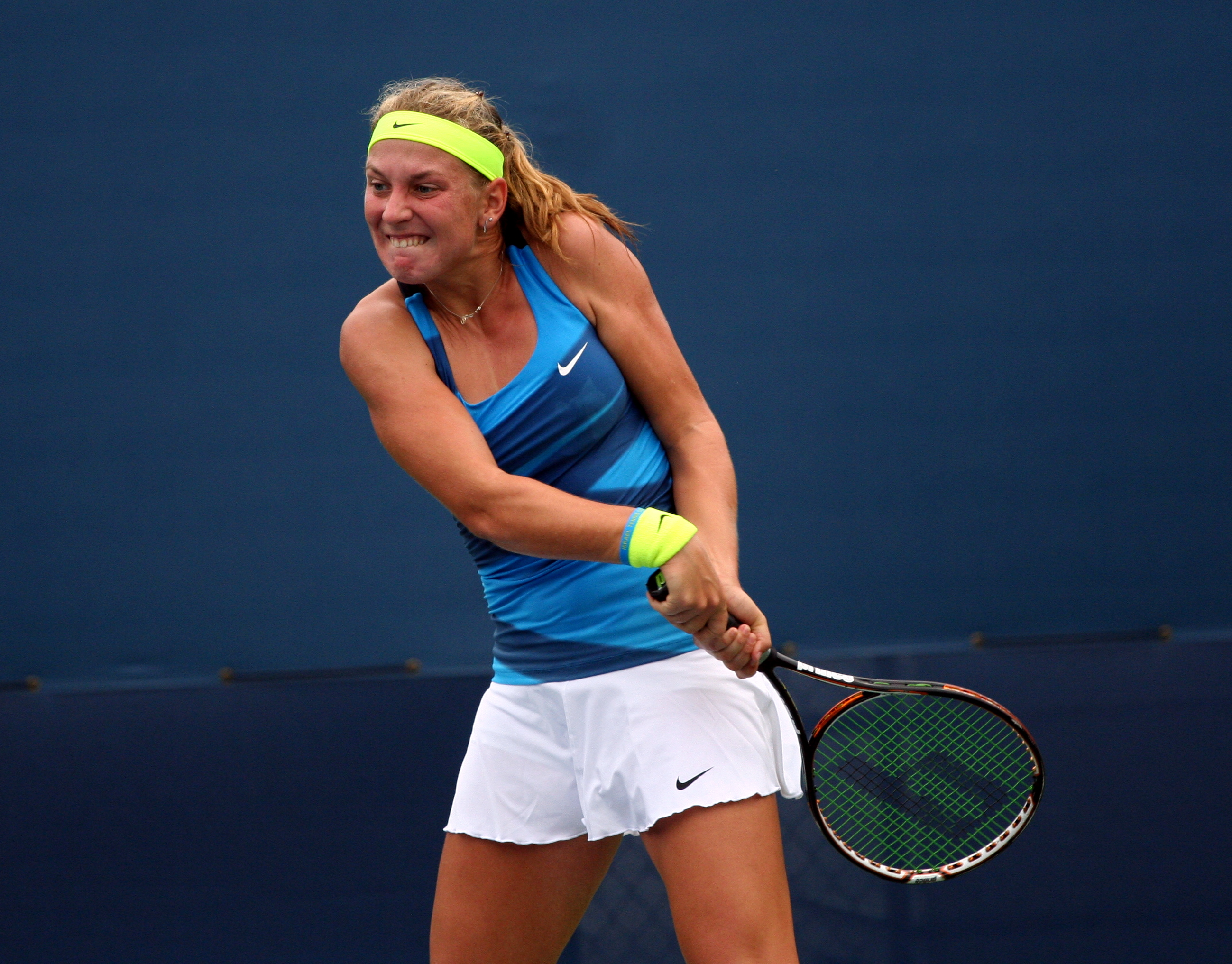
- Patiuk at the 2012 US Open
- Full name: Valeria Patiuk
- Native name: ולריה פטיוק
- Country (sports): Israel
- Born: 11 May 1996 (age 29) Zaporizhia, Ukraine
- Prize money: US$ 11,285

Singles
- Career record: 42–37
- Career titles: 0 WTA, 1 ITF
- Highest ranking: No. 640 (19 December 2011)

Grand Slam singles results
- Australian Open Junior: 1R (2012)
- French Open Junior: Q1 (2012)
- Wimbledon Junior: Q2 (2012)
- US Open Junior: 2R (2011, 2012)

Doubles
- Career record: 29–28
- Career titles: 0 WTA, 2 ITF
- Highest ranking: No. 603 (25 February 2013)

Grand Slam doubles results
- US Open Junior: 2R (2011, 2012)

Team competitions
- Fed Cup: 0–2
- Last updated on: 6 February 2017.

Valeria Patiuk (Hebrew: ולריה פטיוק; born 11 May 1996 in Zaporizhia, Ukraine) is an Israeli former tennis player.

Patiuk has won one singles and two doubles titles on the ITF tour in her career. On 19 December 2011, she reached her best singles ranking of world number 640. On 25 February 2013, she peaked at world number 603 in the doubles rankings.

Patiuk made her debut for the Israel Fed Cup team in 2011, losing to Dia Evtimova and Magdalena Maleeva of Bulgaria in doubles.

== ITF finals (3–2) ==
=== Singles (1–0) ===
| Legend $100,000 tournaments $75,000 tournaments $50,000 tournaments $25,000 tournaments $15,000 tournaments $10,000 tournaments | Finals by surface Hard (1–0) Clay (0–0) Grass (0–0) Carpet (0–0) |

| Outcome | No. | Date | Tournament | Surface | Opponent | Score |
|---|---|---|---|---|---|---|
| Winner | 1. | 23 May 2011 | Ra'anana, Israel | Hard | (Israel) Keren Shlomo | 6–4, 2–6, 6–1 |

=== Doubles (2–2) ===
| Legend $100,000 tournaments $75,000 tournaments $50,000 tournaments $25,000 tournaments $15,000 tournaments $10,000 tournaments | Finals by surface Hard (2–2) Clay (0–0) Grass (0–0) Carpet (0–0) |

| Outcome | No. | Date | Tournament | Surface | Partner | Opponents | Score |
|---|---|---|---|---|---|---|---|
| Winner | 1. | 23 May 2011 | Ra'anana, Israel | Hard | (Israel) Ofri Lankri | (Israel) Lee Or (Israel) Margarita-Greta Skripnik | 6–2, 6–1 |
| Runner-up | 1. | 8 December 2014 | Tel Aviv, Israel | Hard | (Israel) Keren Shlomo | (Moldova) Julia Helbet (Russia) Marta Paigina | 4–6, 2–6 |
| Winner | 2. | 1 June 2015 | Ramat Gan, Israel | Hard | (Israel) Keren Shlomo | (Israel) Ofri Lankri (Israel) Alona Pushkarevsky | 6–4, 6–2 |
| Runner-up | 2. | 8 June 2015 | Ramat Gan, Israel | Hard | (Israel) Keren Shlomo | (Israel) Ofri Lankri (Israel) Alona Pushkarevsky | 3–6, 4–6 |

== Fed Cup participation ==
=== Doubles ===
| Edition | Stage | Date | Location | Against | Surface | Partner | Opponents | W/L | Score |
|---|---|---|---|---|---|---|---|---|---|
| 2011 Fed Cup; Europe/Africa Zone Group I | R/R | 4 February 2011 | Eilat, Israel | Bulgaria | Hard | (Israel) Keren Shlomo | (Bulgaria) Dia Evtimova (Bulgaria) Magdalena Maleeva | L | 3–6, 4–6 |
| 2013 Fed Cup; Europe/Africa Zone Group I | R/R | 6 February 2013 | Eilat, Israel | Turkey | Hard | (Israel) Keren Shlomo | (Turkey) Başak Eraydın (Turkey) İpek Soylu | L | 2–6, 1–6 |
