= Alona Pushkarevsky =

Israeli tennis player

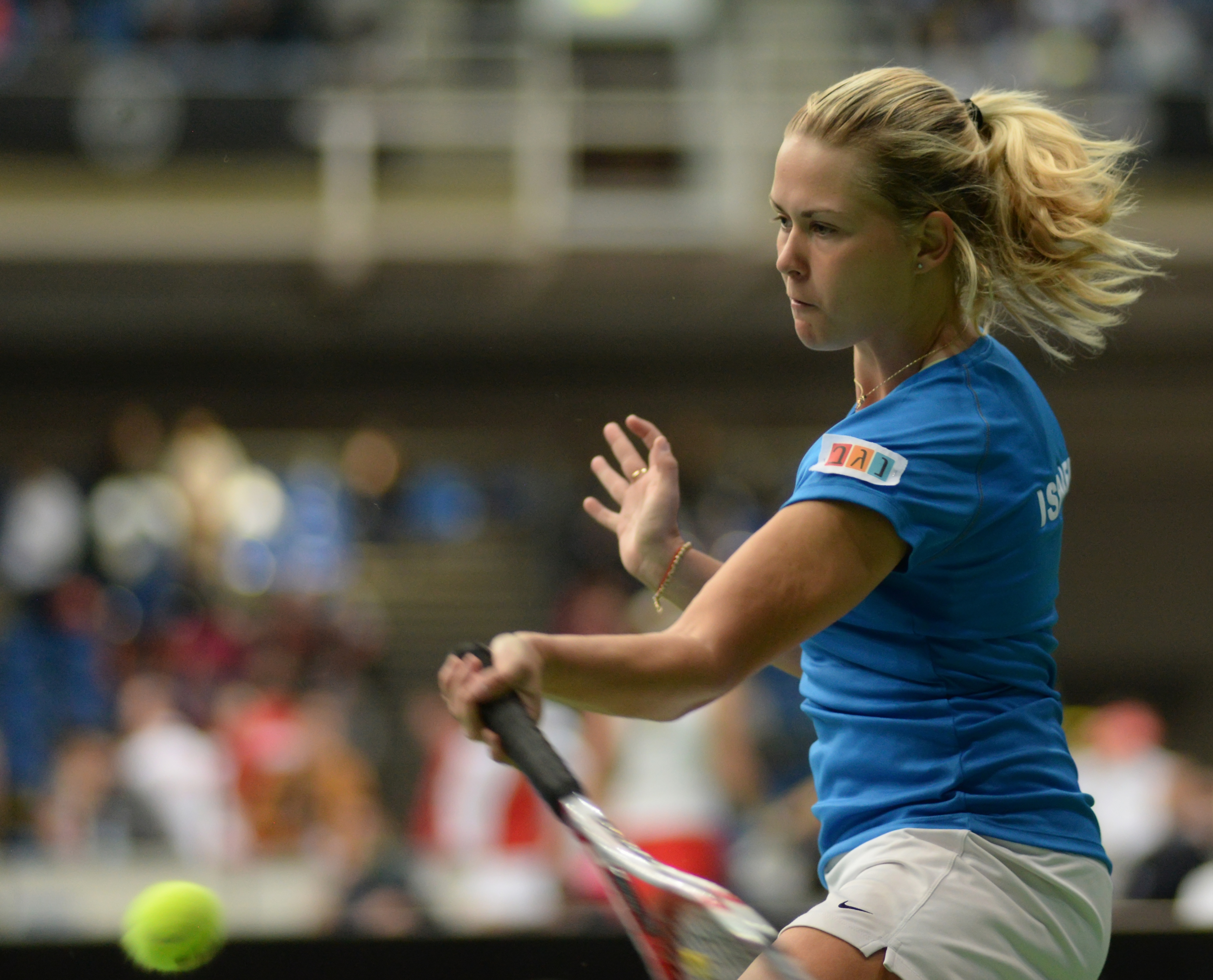
- Pushkarevsky at 2015 Fed Cup
- Full name: Alona Pushkarevsky
- Native name: אלונה פושקרבסקי
- Country (sports): Israel
- Born: 28 January 1997 (age 29) Haifa, Israel
- Height: 1.74 m (5 ft 9 in)
- Plays: Left-handed (two-handed backhand)
- Prize money: US$ 6,886

Singles
- Career record: 20-31
- Career titles: 0 WTA, 0 ITF
- Highest ranking: No. 933 (7 December 2015)

Doubles
- Career record: 36-32
- Career titles: 0 WTA, 2 ITF
- Highest ranking: No. 618 (13 July 2015)

Team competitions
- Fed Cup: 0–4
- Last updated on: 19 April 2017.

Alona Pushkarevsky (Hebrew: אלונה פושקרבסקי; born 28 January 1997 in Haifa) is an Israeli former tennis player.

Playing for Israel at the Fed Cup, Pushkarevsky has a win–loss record of 0–4.

== Career ==
She won two ITF 10k tournaments with Ofri Lankri during 2015.

She had a knee surgery in the end of June 2016.

== ITF Finals ==
=== Doubles (2–3) ===
Result	No.	Date	Tournament	Surface	Partner	Opponents	Score
Winner	1.	22 May 2015	Netanya, Israel	Hard	(Israel) Ofri Lankri	(Uzbekistan) Vlada Ekshibarova (Israel) Deniz Khazaniuk	6–3, 6–3
Runner-up	2.	5 June 2015	Ramat Gan, Israel	Hard	(Israel) Ofri Lankri	(Israel) Valeria Patiuk (Israel) Keren Shlomo	4–6, 2–6
Winner	3.	11 June 2015	Ramat Gan, Israel	Hard	(Israel) Ofri Lankri	(Israel) Valeria Patiuk (Israel) Keren Shlomo	6–3, 6–4
Runner-up	4.	23 May 2016	Ramat Gan, Israel	Hard	(Israel) Shelly Krolitzky	(Hungary) Naomi Totka (Montenegro) Ana Veselinović	6–2, 3–6, [6–10]
Runner-up	5.	12 September 2016	Ashkelon, Israel	Hard	(Israel) Keren Shlomo	(Israel) Vlada Ekshibarova (United States) Madeleine Kobelt	6–4, 5–7, [8–10]
