= Chen Astrogo =

Israeli tennis player

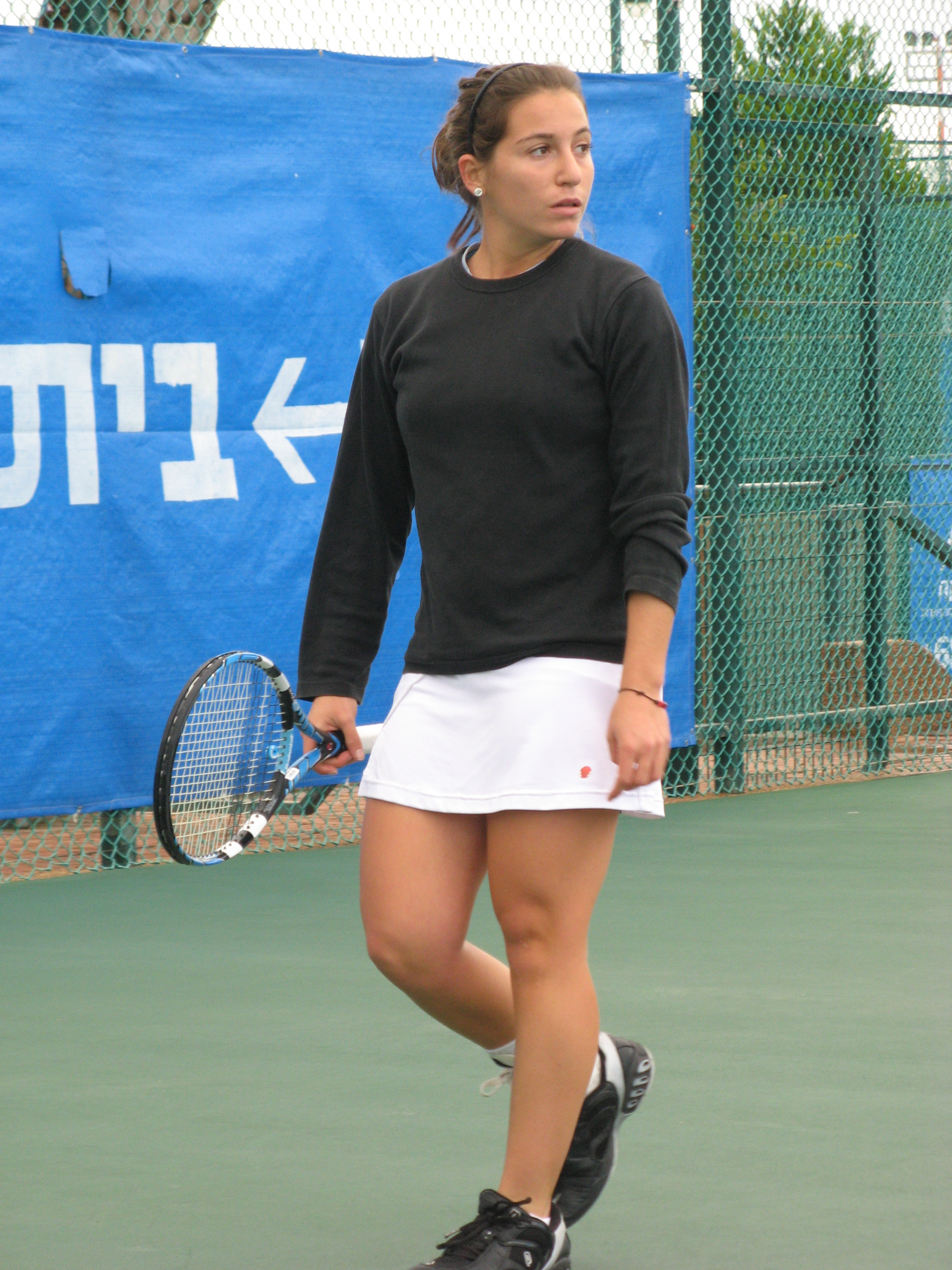
- Native name: חן אסטרוגו
- Country (sports): Israel
- Born: 25 February 1990 (age 36) Holon, Israel
- Height: 1.56 m (5 ft 1 in)
- Plays: Right-handed
- Prize money: $19,161

Singles
- Career record: 60–51
- Highest ranking: No. 468 (7 June 2010)

Doubles
- Career record: 53–39
- Career titles: 4 ITF
- Highest ranking: No. 377 (11 October 2010)

Chen Astrogo (Hebrew: חן אסטרוגו; born 25 February 1990) is an Israeli former professional tennis player.

== Life and career ==
Born in Holon, Astrogo was a right-handed player, who was small in stature at 1.56 m. She featured in the junior draw of the 2008 Australian Open and won four ITF doubles titles while competing on the professional tennis circuit.

Astrogo represented Israel in a 2010 Fed Cup tie against the Netherlands in Lisbon, Portugal. She played in the dead rubber doubles with Karen Shlomo, which they lost to Richèl Hogenkamp and Nicole Thyssen.

== ITF finals ==
Legend
$25,000 tournaments
$10,000 tournaments

=== Singles: 1 (0–1) ===
Outcome	Date	Tournament	Surface	Opponent	Score
Runner-up	20 July 2008	Balș, Romania	Clay	(Romania) Elora Dabija	5–7, 1–6

=== Doubles: 7 (4–3) ===
Outcome	No.	Date	Tournament	Surface	Partner	Opponents	Score
Runner-up	1.	25 May 2008	Ra'anana, Israel	Hard	(Netherlands) Marcella Koek	(Georgia (country)) Manana Shapakidze (Israel) Julia Glushko	5–7, 7–6^{(5)}, [6–10]
Winner	1.	15 June 2008	Istanbul, Turkey	Hard	(Belarus) Volha Duko	(Bulgaria) Dessislava Mladenova (Turkey) Pemra Özgen	7–5, 1–6, [10–5]
Winner	2.	2 November 2008	Ramle, Israel	Hard	(Russia) Anna Rapoport	(Israel) Angelika Aliev (Germany) Xenia Suworowa	3–6, 6–2, [10–2]
Runner-up	2.	25 October 2009	Lagos, Nigeria	Hard	(Israel) Keren Shlomo	(Russia) Nina Bratchikova (Greece) Anna Gerasimou	4–6, 5–7
Winner	3.	1 November 2009	Tel Aviv, Israel	Hard	(Israel) Keren Shlomo	(Russia) Maya Gaverova (Russia) Anna Rapoport	6–7^{(5)}, 6–4, [10–7]
Winner	4.	19 September 2010	Mytilene, Greece	Hard	(Israel) Keren Shlomo	(Turkey) Başak Eraydın (Russia) Diana Isaeva	6–1, 6–3
Runner-up	3.	26 September 2010	Thessaloniki, Greece	Clay	(Israel) Keren Shlomo	(Germany) Kim Grajdek (Russia) Anastasia Mukhametova	2–6, 3–6

== See also ==
- List of Israel Fed Cup team representatives
