= 2013 ITF Women's Circuit (January–March) =

Women's tennis tournament series

The 2013 ITF Women's Circuit is the 2013 edition of the second tier tour for women's professional tennis. It is organised by the International Tennis Federation and is a tier below the WTA Tour. The ITF Women's Circuit includes tournaments with prize money ranging from $10,000 up to $100,000.

== Key ==
$100,000 tournaments
$75,000 tournaments
$50,000 tournaments
$25,000 tournaments
$15,000 tournaments
$10,000 tournaments
All titles

== Month ==
=== January ===
Week of	Tournament	Winner	Runners-up	Semifinalists	Quarterfinalists
December 31, 2012	Hong Kong; Hard $10,000; Singles and doubles draws	(China) Tian Ran; 7–6^{(11–9)}, 2–6, 6–3	(China) Liang Chen	(Japan) Yuuki Tanaka (South Korea) Kim Na-ri	(South Korea) Lee Ye-ra (China) Wen Xin (Chinese Taipei) Juan Ting-fei (Chinese Taipei) Lee Pei-chi
December 31, 2012	Hong Kong; Hard $10,000; Singles and doubles draws	(China) Tang Haochen (China) Tian Ran; 6–2, 6–1	(Japan) Eri Hozumi (Japan) Miyu Kato	(Japan) Yuuki Tanaka (South Korea) Kim Na-ri	(South Korea) Lee Ye-ra (China) Wen Xin (Chinese Taipei) Juan Ting-fei (Chinese Taipei) Lee Pei-chi
December 31, 2012	Fort-de-France, Martinique, France; Hard $10,000; Singles and doubles draws	(Canada) Sonja Molnar; 6–2, 6–0	(France) Sherazad Benamar	(United States) Denise Starr (United States) Eva Raszkiewicz	(France) Océane Adam (France) Virginie Ayassamy (United States) Danielle Mills (Netherlands) Indy de Vroome
December 31, 2012	Fort-de-France, Martinique, France; Hard $10,000; Singles and doubles draws	(United States) Denise Starr (Netherlands) Indy de Vroome; 6–4, 6–3	(France) Sherazad Benamar (France) Brandy Mina	(United States) Denise Starr (United States) Eva Raszkiewicz	(France) Océane Adam (France) Virginie Ayassamy (United States) Danielle Mills (Netherlands) Indy de Vroome
January 7, 2013	Blossom Cup; Quanzhou, China; Hard $50,000; Singles – Doubles	(Thailand) Varatchaya Wongteanchai; 6–2, 6–7^{(5–7)}, 7–6^{(7–5)}	(Ukraine) Nadiia Kichenok	(Chinese Taipei) Chan Chin-wei (China) Tian Ran	(China) Lu Jiajing (China) Yang Zi (China) Wang Yafan (China) Tang Haochen
January 7, 2013	Blossom Cup; Quanzhou, China; Hard $50,000; Singles – Doubles	(Ukraine) Irina Buryachok (Ukraine) Nadiia Kichenok; 3–6, 6–3, [12–10]	(China) Liang Chen (China) Sun Shengnan	(Chinese Taipei) Chan Chin-wei (China) Tian Ran	(China) Lu Jiajing (China) Yang Zi (China) Wang Yafan (China) Tang Haochen
January 7, 2013	Innisbrook, United States; Clay $25,000; Singles and doubles draws	(Slovenia) Tadeja Majerič; 6–2, 6–3	(Croatia) Ajla Tomljanović	(Germany) Kristina Barrois (Norway) Ulrikke Eikeri	(Sweden) Hilda Melander (Slovenia) Maša Zec Peškirič (Ukraine) Elizaveta Ianchuk (Germany) Anne Schäfer
January 7, 2013	Innisbrook, United States; Clay $25,000; Singles and doubles draws	(Norway) Ulrikke Eikeri (United States) Chieh-Yu Hsu; 6–3, 6–0	(Argentina) Florencia Molinero (Venezuela) Adriana Pérez	(Germany) Kristina Barrois (Norway) Ulrikke Eikeri	(Sweden) Hilda Melander (Slovenia) Maša Zec Peškirič (Ukraine) Elizaveta Ianchuk (Germany) Anne Schäfer
January 7, 2013	Saint Martin, France; Hard $10,000; Singles and doubles draws	(Netherlands) Indy de Vroome; 6–3, 6–2	(France) Léa Tholey	(France) Estelle Cascino (France) Sherazad Benamar	(United States) Noelle Hickey (France) Anaève Pain (France) Jade Suvrijn (France) Océane Adam
January 7, 2013	Saint Martin, France; Hard $10,000; Singles and doubles draws	(France) Estelle Cascino (France) Léa Tholey; 6–3, 6–3	(United States) Erin Clark (Canada) Sonja Molnar	(France) Estelle Cascino (France) Sherazad Benamar	(United States) Noelle Hickey (France) Anaève Pain (France) Jade Suvrijn (France) Océane Adam
January 7, 2013	Hong Kong; Hard $10,000; Singles and doubles draws	(Japan) Sachie Ishizu; 2–6, 6–1, 6–3	(China) Wen Xin	(South Korea) Lee Ye-ra (South Korea) Kim Na-ri	(Japan) Emi Mutaguchi (Chinese Taipei) Juan Ting-fei (Japan) Eri Hozumi (Japan) Mana Ayukawa
January 7, 2013	Hong Kong; Hard $10,000; Singles and doubles draws	(China) Li Yihong (China) Wen Xin; 4–6, 6–1, [12–10]	(Japan) Eri Hozumi (Japan) Miyu Kato	(South Korea) Lee Ye-ra (South Korea) Kim Na-ri	(Japan) Emi Mutaguchi (Chinese Taipei) Juan Ting-fei (Japan) Eri Hozumi (Japan) Mana Ayukawa
January 7, 2013	Antalya, Turkey; Clay $10,000; Singles and doubles draws	(Hungary) Réka-Luca Jani; 6–1, 1–6, 7–6^{(7–4)}	(Netherlands) Marrit Boonstra	(Ukraine) Marianna Zakarlyuk (Turkey) Melis Sezer	(Japan) Chiaki Okadaue (Belgium) Ysaline Bonaventure (France) Victoria Muntean (Romania) Raluca Elena Platon
January 7, 2013	Antalya, Turkey; Clay $10,000; Singles and doubles draws	(Japan) Chiaki Okadaue (Turkey) Melis Sezer; 6–3, 6–4	(Georgia (country)) Sofia Kvatsabaia (Ukraine) Marianna Zakarlyuk	(Ukraine) Marianna Zakarlyuk (Turkey) Melis Sezer	(Japan) Chiaki Okadaue (Belgium) Ysaline Bonaventure (France) Victoria Muntean (Romania) Raluca Elena Platon
January 14, 2013	Port St. Lucie, United States; Clay $25,000; Singles and doubles draws	(Canada) Sharon Fichman; 6–3, 6–2	(Slovenia) Tadeja Majerič	(China) Zhang Shuai (Ukraine) Tetyana Arefyeva	(Croatia) Ajla Tomljanović (Argentina) Florencia Molinero (Colombia) Catalina Castaño (Venezuela) Adriana Pérez
January 14, 2013	Port St. Lucie, United States; Clay $25,000; Singles and doubles draws	(Russia) Angelina Gabueva (United States) Allie Will; 4–6, 6–2, [10–7]	(Argentina) Florencia Molinero (Venezuela) Adriana Pérez	(China) Zhang Shuai (Ukraine) Tetyana Arefyeva	(Croatia) Ajla Tomljanović (Argentina) Florencia Molinero (Colombia) Catalina Castaño (Venezuela) Adriana Pérez
January 14, 2013	Sharm el-Sheikh, Egypt; Hard $10,000; Singles and doubles draws	(Czech Republic) Denisa Allertová; 6–2, 4–6, 7–6^{(7–1)}	(Russia) Eugeniya Pashkova	(Oman) Fatma Al Nabhani (Turkey) Melis Sezer	(Austria) Melanie Klaffner (Egypt) Mayar Sherif (Switzerland) Xenia Knoll (Belgium) Marie Benoît
January 14, 2013	Sharm el-Sheikh, Egypt; Hard $10,000; Singles and doubles draws	(Russia) Eugeniya Pashkova (Russia) Ekaterina Yashina; 3–6, 6–2, [10–3]	(Netherlands) Valeria Podda (Egypt) Mayar Sherif	(Oman) Fatma Al Nabhani (Turkey) Melis Sezer	(Austria) Melanie Klaffner (Egypt) Mayar Sherif (Switzerland) Xenia Knoll (Belgium) Marie Benoît
January 14, 2013	Le Gosier, Guadeloupe, France; Hard $10,000; Singles and doubles draws	(United States) Noelle Hickey; 7–5, 6–2	(France) Léa Tholey	(France) Virginie Ayassamy (Canada) Sonja Molnar	(Russia) Margarita Lazareva (France) Jade Suvrijn (France) Lou Brouleau (France) Estelle Cascino
January 14, 2013	Le Gosier, Guadeloupe, France; Hard $10,000; Singles and doubles draws	(United States) Noelle Hickey (United States) Kady Pooler; 6–0, 1–6, [10–7]	(France) Estelle Cascino (France) Léa Tholey	(France) Virginie Ayassamy (Canada) Sonja Molnar	(Russia) Margarita Lazareva (France) Jade Suvrijn (France) Lou Brouleau (France) Estelle Cascino
January 14, 2013	Stuttgart-Stammheim, Germany; Hard (indoor) $10,000; Singles and doubles draws	(Germany) Julia Kimmelmann; 6–4, 6–3	(Germany) Laura Siegemund	(Czech Republic) Tereza Smitková (Colombia) Yuliana Lizarazo	(Slovenia) Anja Prislan (Czech Republic) Martina Borecká (Italy) Anna Remondina (Germany) Laura Schaeder
January 14, 2013	Stuttgart-Stammheim, Germany; Hard (indoor) $10,000; Singles and doubles draws	(Switzerland) Viktorija Golubic (Germany) Julia Kimmelmann; 6–4, 6–1	(Russia) Olga Doroshina (Russia) Julia Valetova	(Czech Republic) Tereza Smitková (Colombia) Yuliana Lizarazo	(Slovenia) Anja Prislan (Czech Republic) Martina Borecká (Italy) Anna Remondina (Germany) Laura Schaeder
January 14, 2013	Antalya, Turkey; Clay $10,000; Singles and doubles draws	(Hungary) Réka-Luca Jani; 6–0, 6–1	(Georgia (country)) Sofia Kvatsabaia	(Romania) Alexandra Dulgheru (Belgium) Ysaline Bonaventure	(Russia) Anastasia Rudakova (Belgium) Elyne Boeykens (Russia) Yana Buchina (Venezuela) Andrea Gámiz
January 14, 2013	Antalya, Turkey; Clay $10,000; Singles and doubles draws	(South Korea) Lee Jin-a (South Korea) Yoo Mi; 6–3, 6–4	(Belgium) Elyne Boeykens (Netherlands) Kelly Versteeg	(Romania) Alexandra Dulgheru (Belgium) Ysaline Bonaventure	(Russia) Anastasia Rudakova (Belgium) Elyne Boeykens (Russia) Yana Buchina (Venezuela) Andrea Gámiz
January 14, 2013	Glasgow, United Kingdom; Hard (indoor) $10,000; Singles and doubles draws	(United Kingdom) Tara Moore; 6–4, 6–1	(France) Myrtille Georges	(Belgium) Alison Van Uytvanck (France) Victoria Larrière	(United Kingdom) Lisa Whybourn (Republic of Ireland) Amy Bowtell (United Kingdom) Lucy Brown (United Kingdom) Danielle Konotoptseva
January 14, 2013	Glasgow, United Kingdom; Hard (indoor) $10,000; Singles and doubles draws	(United Kingdom) Tara Moore (United Kingdom) Melanie South; 7–6^{(7–5)}, 6–3	(United Kingdom) Anna Smith (United Kingdom) Francesca Stephenson	(Belgium) Alison Van Uytvanck (France) Victoria Larrière	(United Kingdom) Lisa Whybourn (Republic of Ireland) Amy Bowtell (United Kingdom) Lucy Brown (United Kingdom) Danielle Konotoptseva
January 21, 2013	Andrézieux-Bouthéon, France; Hard (indoor) $25,000; Singles and doubles draws	(Belgium) Alison Van Uytvanck; 6–1, 6–4	(Croatia) Ana Vrljić	(Italy) Anna Remondina (Ukraine) Yuliya Beygelzimer	(Netherlands) Richèl Hogenkamp (Serbia) Aleksandra Krunić (Slovakia) Michaela Hončová (Russia) Ekaterina Bychkova
January 21, 2013	Andrézieux-Bouthéon, France; Hard (indoor) $25,000; Singles and doubles draws	(Switzerland) Amra Sadiković (Croatia) Ana Vrljić; 5–7, 7–5, [10–4]	(Russia) Margarita Gasparyan (Ukraine) Olga Savchuk	(Italy) Anna Remondina (Ukraine) Yuliya Beygelzimer	(Netherlands) Richèl Hogenkamp (Serbia) Aleksandra Krunić (Slovakia) Michaela Hončová (Russia) Ekaterina Bychkova
January 21, 2013	Lima, Peru; Clay $15,000; Singles and doubles draws	(Brazil) Maria Fernanda Alves; 6–2, 6–2	(Sweden) Hilda Melander	(Peru) Patricia Kú Flores (Argentina) Vanesa Furlanetto	(Slovakia) Martina Frantová (Brazil) Nathalia Rossi (Sweden) Sandra Roma (United States) Ryann Foster
January 21, 2013	Lima, Peru; Clay $15,000; Singles and doubles draws	(Brazil) Maria Fernanda Alves (Argentina) Vanesa Furlanetto; 6–1, 6–4	(Peru) Patricia Kú Flores (Peru) Katherine Miranda Chang	(Peru) Patricia Kú Flores (Argentina) Vanesa Furlanetto	(Slovakia) Martina Frantová (Brazil) Nathalia Rossi (Sweden) Sandra Roma (United States) Ryann Foster
January 21, 2013	Sharm el-Sheikh, Egypt; Hard $10,000; Singles and doubles draws	(Egypt) Mayar Sherif; 6–2, 2–6, 6–1	(Bulgaria) Aleksandrina Naydenova	(Switzerland) Xenia Knoll (Austria) Melanie Klaffner	(Belgium) Marie Benoît (France) Josepha Adam (Italy) Francesca Palmigiano (Russia) Ekaterina Yashina
January 21, 2013	Sharm el-Sheikh, Egypt; Hard $10,000; Singles and doubles draws	(Belarus) Lidziya Marozava (Russia) Eugeniya Pashkova; 6–3, 6–1	(Austria) Melanie Klaffner (Turkey) Melis Sezer	(Switzerland) Xenia Knoll (Austria) Melanie Klaffner	(Belgium) Marie Benoît (France) Josepha Adam (Italy) Francesca Palmigiano (Russia) Ekaterina Yashina
January 21, 2013	Kaarst, Germany; Carpet (indoor) $10,000; Singles and doubles draws	(Germany) Julia Kimmelmann; 6–3, 6–2	(Russia) Ekaterina Alexandrova	(Switzerland) Viktorija Golubic (Czech Republic) Kateřina Vaňková	(Denmark) Karen Barbat (Germany) Franziska König (Germany) Nina Zander (Slovenia) Anja Prislan
January 21, 2013	Kaarst, Germany; Carpet (indoor) $10,000; Singles and doubles draws	(Switzerland) Viktorija Golubic (Germany) Julia Kimmelmann; 6–3, 4–6, [10–5]	(Slovenia) Anja Prislan (Germany) Jasmin Steinherr	(Switzerland) Viktorija Golubic (Czech Republic) Kateřina Vaňková	(Denmark) Karen Barbat (Germany) Franziska König (Germany) Nina Zander (Slovenia) Anja Prislan
January 21, 2013	Eilat, Israel; Hard $10,000; Singles and doubles draws	(Russia) Alla Kudryavtseva; 6–7^{(4–7)}, 6–3, 6–2	(Romania) Raluca Olaru	(Belarus) Ilona Kremen (Ukraine) Valentyna Ivakhnenko	(Ukraine) Veronika Kapshay (Turkey) Pemra Özgen (Russia) Alexandra Artamonova (Belarus) Aliaksandra Sasnovich
January 21, 2013	Eilat, Israel; Hard $10,000; Singles and doubles draws	(Russia) Alla Kudryavtseva (Romania) Raluca Olaru; 6–3, 6–3	(Belarus) Ilona Kremen (Turkey) Pemra Özgen	(Belarus) Ilona Kremen (Ukraine) Valentyna Ivakhnenko	(Ukraine) Veronika Kapshay (Turkey) Pemra Özgen (Russia) Alexandra Artamonova (Belarus) Aliaksandra Sasnovich
January 21, 2013	Antalya, Turkey; Clay $10,000; Singles and doubles draws	(Romania) Alexandra Dulgheru; 6–2, 6–2	(Hungary) Réka-Luca Jani	(Spain) Inés Ferrer Suárez (Italy) Gaia Sanesi	(China) Yang Zi (Venezuela) Andrea Gámiz (Spain) Olga Sáez Larra (Russia) Yana Buchina
January 21, 2013	Antalya, Turkey; Clay $10,000; Singles and doubles draws	(South Korea) Lee Jin-a (South Korea) Yoo Mi; 6–3, 6–1	(Serbia) Natalija Kostić (Italy) Gaia Sanesi	(Spain) Inés Ferrer Suárez (Italy) Gaia Sanesi	(China) Yang Zi (Venezuela) Andrea Gámiz (Spain) Olga Sáez Larra (Russia) Yana Buchina
January 21, 2013	Preston, United Kingdom; Hard (indoor) $10,000; Singles and doubles draws	(United Kingdom) Tara Moore; 7–6^{(7–2)}, 6–1	(Republic of Ireland) Amy Bowtell	(Italy) Angelica Moratelli (France) Océane Dodin	(United Kingdom) Samantha Murray (Republic of Ireland) Sinéad Lohan (United Kingdom) Melanie South (Czech Republic) Sandra Hönigová
January 21, 2013	Preston, United Kingdom; Hard (indoor) $10,000; Singles and doubles draws	(United Kingdom) Samantha Murray (United Kingdom) Jade Windley; 6–3, 3–6, [10–5]	(United Kingdom) Tara Moore (United Kingdom) Melanie South	(Italy) Angelica Moratelli (France) Océane Dodin	(United Kingdom) Samantha Murray (Republic of Ireland) Sinéad Lohan (United Kingdom) Melanie South (Czech Republic) Sandra Hönigová
January 28, 2013	Vanessa Phillips women's tournament Eilat, Israel; Hard $75,000; Singles – Doubles	(Ukraine) Elina Svitolina; 6–3, 3–6, 7–5	(Russia) Marta Sirotkina	(Romania) Andreea Mitu (Belarus) Ilona Kremen	(Kazakhstan) Yulia Putintseva (Croatia) Tereza Mrdeža (Czech Republic) Tereza Smitková (United Kingdom) Johanna Konta
January 28, 2013	Vanessa Phillips women's tournament Eilat, Israel; Hard $75,000; Singles – Doubles	(Russia) Alla Kudryavtseva (Ukraine) Elina Svitolina; 6–1, 6–3	(Italy) Corinna Dentoni (Belarus) Aliaksandra Sasnovich	(Romania) Andreea Mitu (Belarus) Ilona Kremen	(Kazakhstan) Yulia Putintseva (Croatia) Tereza Mrdeža (Czech Republic) Tereza Smitková (United Kingdom) Johanna Konta
January 28, 2013	McDonald's Burnie International; Burnie, Australia; Hard $25,000; Singles – Doubles	(Australia) Olivia Rogowska; 7–6^{(7–5)}, 6–7^{(7–9)}, 6–4	(Australia) Monique Adamczak	(Australia) Bojana Bobusic (Estonia) Anett Kontaveit	(Russia) Arina Rodionova (Croatia) Ana Savić (China) Sun Shengnan (Australia) Sacha Jones
January 28, 2013	McDonald's Burnie International; Burnie, Australia; Hard $25,000; Singles – Doubles	(Japan) Shuko Aoyama (Japan) Erika Sema; Walkover	(Australia) Bojana Bobusic (Australia) Jessica Moore	(Australia) Bojana Bobusic (Estonia) Anett Kontaveit	(Russia) Arina Rodionova (Croatia) Ana Savić (China) Sun Shengnan (Australia) Sacha Jones
January 28, 2013	Sharm el-Sheikh, Egypt; Hard $10,000; Singles and doubles draws	(Switzerland) Lara Michel; 6–3, 4–6, 6–2	(Czech Republic) Pernilla Mendesová	(Russia) Daria Mironova (United Kingdom) Amanda Carreras	(Bulgaria) Aleksandrina Naydenova (Turkey) Melis Sezer (Switzerland) Xenia Knoll (Slovakia) Chantal Škamlová
January 28, 2013	Sharm el-Sheikh, Egypt; Hard $10,000; Singles and doubles draws	(Poland) Katarzyna Kawa (Poland) Natalia Kołat; 6–1, 6–4	(Bulgaria) Aleksandrina Naydenova (Russia) Ekaterina Yashina	(Russia) Daria Mironova (United Kingdom) Amanda Carreras	(Bulgaria) Aleksandrina Naydenova (Turkey) Melis Sezer (Switzerland) Xenia Knoll (Slovakia) Chantal Škamlová
January 28, 2013	Antalya, Turkey; Clay $10,000; Singles and doubles draws	(South Korea) Lee Jin-a; 7–5, 6–3	(Russia) Yana Buchina	(South Korea) Han Na-lae (Russia) Julia Samuseva	(Bulgaria) Isabella Shinikova (Brazil) Ana Clara Duarte (Netherlands) Monique Zuur (South Korea) Yoo Mi
January 28, 2013	Antalya, Turkey; Clay $10,000; Singles and doubles draws	(South Korea) Han Na-lae (South Korea) Lee Jin-a; 6–3, 6–3	(Spain) Eva Fernández Brugués (Bulgaria) Isabella Shinikova	(South Korea) Han Na-lae (Russia) Julia Samuseva	(Bulgaria) Isabella Shinikova (Brazil) Ana Clara Duarte (Netherlands) Monique Zuur (South Korea) Yoo Mi

=== February ===
Week of	Tournament	Winner	Runners-up	Semifinalists	Quarterfinalists
February 4, 2013	Dow Corning Tennis Classic; Midland, United States; Hard (indoor) $100,000; Singles – Doubles	(United States) Lauren Davis; 6–3, 2–6, 7–6^{(7–2)}	(Croatia) Ajla Tomljanović	(Puerto Rico) Monica Puig (United States) Mallory Burdette	(Russia) Alla Kudryavtseva (United States) Jessica Pegula (Croatia) Mirjana Lučić-Baroni (United States) Maria Sanchez
February 4, 2013	Dow Corning Tennis Classic; Midland, United States; Hard (indoor) $100,000; Singles – Doubles	(Hungary) Melinda Czink (Croatia) Mirjana Lučić-Baroni; 5–7, 6–4, [10–7]	(Brazil) Maria Fernanda Alves (United Kingdom) Samantha Murray	(Puerto Rico) Monica Puig (United States) Mallory Burdette	(Russia) Alla Kudryavtseva (United States) Jessica Pegula (Croatia) Mirjana Lučić-Baroni (United States) Maria Sanchez
February 4, 2013	Grenoble, France; Hard (indoor) $25,000; Singles and doubles draws	(Czech Republic) Sandra Záhlavová; 6–4, 5–7, 6–2	(Ukraine) Maryna Zanevska	(Italy) Giulia Gatto-Monticone (Germany) Julia Kimmelmann	(Czech Republic) Kristýna Plíšková (Czech Republic) Renata Voráčová (Italy) Federica Di Sarra (Czech Republic) Karolína Plíšková
February 4, 2013	Grenoble, France; Hard (indoor) $25,000; Singles and doubles draws	(Russia) Maria Kondratieva (Czech Republic) Renata Voráčová; 6–1, 6–4	(Italy) Nicole Clerico (Spain) Leticia Costas	(Italy) Giulia Gatto-Monticone (Germany) Julia Kimmelmann	(Czech Republic) Kristýna Plíšková (Czech Republic) Renata Voráčová (Italy) Federica Di Sarra (Czech Republic) Karolína Plíšková
February 4, 2013	Rancho Mirage, United States; Hard $25,000; Singles and doubles draws	(Japan) Sachie Ishizu; 6–3, 7–6^{(7–3)}	(France) Julie Coin	(Montenegro) Danka Kovinić (Norway) Ulrikke Eikeri	(United Kingdom) Lisa Whybourn (United Kingdom) Tara Moore (United States) Louisa Chirico (Switzerland) Belinda Bencic
February 4, 2013	Rancho Mirage, United States; Hard $25,000; Singles and doubles draws	(United Kingdom) Tara Moore (United Kingdom) Melanie South; 4–6, 6–2, [12–10]	(United States) Jan Abaza (United States) Louisa Chirico	(Montenegro) Danka Kovinić (Norway) Ulrikke Eikeri	(United Kingdom) Lisa Whybourn (United Kingdom) Tara Moore (United States) Louisa Chirico (Switzerland) Belinda Bencic
February 4, 2013	Launceston, Australia; Hard $25,000; Singles and doubles draws	(Australia) Storm Sanders; 6–4, 6–4	(Japan) Shuko Aoyama	(Russia) Ksenia Lykina (Australia) Sacha Jones	(Australia) Olivia Rogowska (Liechtenstein) Stephanie Vogt (Australia) Viktorija Rajicic (South Africa) Chanel Simmonds
February 4, 2013	Launceston, Australia; Hard $25,000; Singles and doubles draws	(Russia) Ksenia Lykina (United Kingdom) Emily Webley-Smith; 7–5, 6–3	(United States) Allie Kiick (Canada) Erin Routliffe	(Russia) Ksenia Lykina (Australia) Sacha Jones	(Australia) Olivia Rogowska (Liechtenstein) Stephanie Vogt (Australia) Viktorija Rajicic (South Africa) Chanel Simmonds
February 4, 2013	Sharm el-Sheikh, Egypt; Hard $10,000; Singles and doubles draws	(Switzerland) Lara Michel; 6–4, 3–6, 6–4	(Serbia) Doroteja Erić	(Greece) Despina Papamichail (Russia) Marina Shamayko	(Russia) Polina Vinogradova (Romania) Patricia Maria Țig (Austria) Barbara Haas (Czech Republic) Pernilla Mendesová
February 4, 2013	Sharm el-Sheikh, Egypt; Hard $10,000; Singles and doubles draws	(Serbia) Doroteja Erić (Austria) Barbara Haas; 6–2, 7–5	(Czech Republic) Martina Kubičíková (Slovakia) Chantal Škamlová	(Greece) Despina Papamichail (Russia) Marina Shamayko	(Russia) Polina Vinogradova (Romania) Patricia Maria Țig (Austria) Barbara Haas (Czech Republic) Pernilla Mendesová
February 4, 2013	Antalya, Turkey; Clay $10,000; Singles and doubles draws	(Romania) Laura-Ioana Andrei; 6–2, 4–6, 6–2	(Spain) Eva Fernández Brugués	(Japan) Mana Ayukawa (Spain) Olga Sáez Larra	(Russia) Tamara Bizhukova (Brazil) Ana Clara Duarte (China) Yang Zi (Italy) Gaia Sanesi
February 4, 2013	Antalya, Turkey; Clay $10,000; Singles and doubles draws	(Italy) Giulia Bruzzone (Italy) Martina Caregaro; 6–3, 1–6, [10–6]	(Romania) Ana Bogdan (Serbia) Teodora Mirčić	(Japan) Mana Ayukawa (Spain) Olga Sáez Larra	(Russia) Tamara Bizhukova (Brazil) Ana Clara Duarte (China) Yang Zi (Italy) Gaia Sanesi
February 11, 2013	Rancho Santa Fe, United States; Hard $25,000; Singles and doubles draws	(United States) Madison Brengle; 6–1, 6–4	(United States) Nicole Gibbs	(Bulgaria) Elitsa Kostova (Ukraine) Tetyana Arefyeva	(United Kingdom) Tara Moore (United States) Sanaz Marand (Czech Republic) Kateřina Vaňková (Russia) Irina Khromacheva
February 11, 2013	Rancho Santa Fe, United States; Hard $25,000; Singles and doubles draws	(United States) Asia Muhammad (United States) Allie Will; 6–1, 6–4	(United States) Anamika Bhargava (United States) Macall Harkins	(Bulgaria) Elitsa Kostova (Ukraine) Tetyana Arefyeva	(United Kingdom) Tara Moore (United States) Sanaz Marand (Czech Republic) Kateřina Vaňková (Russia) Irina Khromacheva
February 11, 2013	Leimen, Germany; Hard (indoor) $10,000; Singles and doubles draws	(Germany) Julia Kimmelmann; 6–4, 6–3	(Turkey) Pemra Özgen	(Russia) Ekaterina Alexandrova (Germany) Laura Siegemund	(Switzerland) Tess Sugnaux (Lithuania) Akvilė Paražinskaitė (Germany) Korina Perkovic (Germany) Antonia Lottner
February 11, 2013	Leimen, Germany; Hard (indoor) $10,000; Singles and doubles draws	(Germany) Carolin Daniels (Germany) Laura Siegemund; 6–1, 6–4	(Germany) Antonia Lottner (Russia) Daria Salnikova	(Russia) Ekaterina Alexandrova (Germany) Laura Siegemund	(Switzerland) Tess Sugnaux (Lithuania) Akvilė Paražinskaitė (Germany) Korina Perkovic (Germany) Antonia Lottner
February 11, 2013	Linköping, Sweden; Hard (indoor) $10,000; Singles and doubles draws	(Italy) Angelica Moratelli; 7–6^{(7–5)}, 6–1	(Sweden) Malin Ulvefeldt	(Sweden) Rebecca Peterson (Germany) Anna Klasen	(Belarus) Darya Shulzhanok (United Kingdom) Danielle Konotoptseva (United Kingdom) Anna Smith (Denmark) Martine Ditlev
February 11, 2013	Linköping, Sweden; Hard (indoor) $10,000; Singles and doubles draws	(Netherlands) Anna Katalina Alzate Esmurzaeva (Belarus) Darya Shulzhanok; 4–6, 6–2, [10–4]	(Sweden) Louise Brunskog (Hungary) Vanda Lukács	(Sweden) Rebecca Peterson (Germany) Anna Klasen	(Belarus) Darya Shulzhanok (United Kingdom) Danielle Konotoptseva (United Kingdom) Anna Smith (Denmark) Martine Ditlev
February 11, 2013	Sharm el-Sheikh, Egypt; Hard $10,000; Singles and doubles draws	(Russia) Marina Shamayko; 4–6, 6–3, 6–3	(Austria) Barbara Haas	(Czech Republic) Martina Kubičíková (Turkey) İpek Soylu	(Belgium) Justine De Sutter (Russia) Polina Vinogradova (Croatia) Iva Mekovec (Czech Republic) Pernilla Mendesová
February 11, 2013	Sharm el-Sheikh, Egypt; Hard $10,000; Singles and doubles draws	(Greece) Despina Papamichail (Italy) Alice Savoretti; 6–3, 6–4	(Romania) Elena-Teodora Cadar (Romania) Patricia Maria Țig	(Czech Republic) Martina Kubičíková (Turkey) İpek Soylu	(Belgium) Justine De Sutter (Russia) Polina Vinogradova (Croatia) Iva Mekovec (Czech Republic) Pernilla Mendesová
February 11, 2013	Antalya, Turkey; Clay $10,000; Singles and doubles draws	(Serbia) Jovana Jakšić; 5–2, retired	(Bosnia and Herzegovina) Jasmina Tinjić	(Romania) Bianca Hîncu (Romania) Laura-Ioana Andrei	(Romania) Raluca Elena Platon (Georgia (country)) Sofia Kvatsabaia (Ukraine) Nadiya Kolb (Austria) Pia König
February 11, 2013	Antalya, Turkey; Clay $10,000; Singles and doubles draws	(Serbia) Teodora Mirčić (Romania) Raluca Elena Platon; 1–6, 4–5, retired	(Georgia (country)) Ekaterine Gorgodze (Georgia (country)) Sofia Kvatsabaia	(Romania) Bianca Hîncu (Romania) Laura-Ioana Andrei	(Romania) Raluca Elena Platon (Georgia (country)) Sofia Kvatsabaia (Ukraine) Nadiya Kolb (Austria) Pia König
February 18, 2013	Mildura, Australia; Grass $25,000; Singles and doubles draws	(Russia) Ksenia Lykina; 7–6^{(7–3)}, 6–3	(Australia) Azra Hadzic	(Japan) Risa Ozaki (Japan) Yurika Sema	(China) Zhu Lin (Australia) Bojana Bobusic (Japan) Mari Tanaka (Australia) Viktorija Rajicic
February 18, 2013	Mildura, Australia; Grass $25,000; Singles and doubles draws	(Russia) Ksenia Lykina (Japan) Yurika Sema; 6–4, 6–2	(Australia) Bojana Bobusic (United Kingdom) Emily Webley-Smith	(Japan) Risa Ozaki (Japan) Yurika Sema	(China) Zhu Lin (Australia) Bojana Bobusic (Japan) Mari Tanaka (Australia) Viktorija Rajicic
February 18, 2013	Muzaffarnagar, India; Grass $25,000; Singles and doubles draws	(Austria) Melanie Klaffner; 6–2, 6–0	(Ukraine) Veronika Kapshay	(Slovenia) Tadeja Majerič (Thailand) Noppawan Lertcheewakarn	(Thailand) Nicha Lertpitaksinchai (Bulgaria) Aleksandrina Naydenova (Thailand) Peangtarn Plipuech (India) Prerna Bhambri
February 18, 2013	Muzaffarnagar, India; Grass $25,000; Singles and doubles draws	(Thailand) Nicha Lertpitaksinchai (Thailand) Peangtarn Plipuech; 3–6, 6–4, [10–8]	(Poland) Justyna Jegiołka (Ukraine) Veronika Kapshay	(Slovenia) Tadeja Majerič (Thailand) Noppawan Lertcheewakarn	(Thailand) Nicha Lertpitaksinchai (Bulgaria) Aleksandrina Naydenova (Thailand) Peangtarn Plipuech (India) Prerna Bhambri
February 18, 2013	Moscow, Russia; Hard (indoor) $25,000; Singles and doubles draws	(Ukraine) Maryna Zanevska; 6–4, 7–6^{(7–5)}	(Georgia (country)) Sofia Shapatava	(Russia) Tatiana Kotelnikova (Germany) Anna-Lena Friedsam	(Russia) Valeria Solovyeva (Czech Republic) Tereza Smitková (Russia) Yuliya Kalabina (Russia) Mayya Katsitadze
February 18, 2013	Moscow, Russia; Hard (indoor) $25,000; Singles and doubles draws	(Russia) Margarita Gasparyan (Russia) Polina Monova; 6–4, 2–6, [10–5]	(Russia) Valeria Solovyeva (Ukraine) Maryna Zanevska	(Russia) Tatiana Kotelnikova (Germany) Anna-Lena Friedsam	(Russia) Valeria Solovyeva (Czech Republic) Tereza Smitková (Russia) Yuliya Kalabina (Russia) Mayya Katsitadze
February 18, 2013	Surprise, United States; Hard $25,000; Singles and doubles draws	(United Kingdom) Tara Moore; 6–3, 6–1	(United States) Louisa Chirico	(Australia) Jarmila Gajdošová (France) Irena Pavlovic	(France) Alizé Lim (United States) Sachia Vickery (United States) Madison Brengle (Croatia) Ana Vrljić
February 18, 2013	Surprise, United States; Hard $25,000; Singles and doubles draws	(United States) Samantha Crawford (United States) Sachia Vickery; 6–3, 3–6, [10–7]	(United States) Emily J. Harman (China) Xu Yifan	(Australia) Jarmila Gajdošová (France) Irena Pavlovic	(France) Alizé Lim (United States) Sachia Vickery (United States) Madison Brengle (Croatia) Ana Vrljić
February 18, 2013	Sharm el-Sheikh, Egypt; Hard $10,000; Singles and doubles draws	(Russia) Polina Vinogradova; 6–2, 6–7^{(7–9)}, 6–2	(France) Clothilde de Bernardi	(Chinese Taipei) Lee Pei-chi (Croatia) Adrijana Lekaj	(Romania) Elena-Teodora Cadar (Austria) Barbara Haas (Turkey) İpek Soylu (Argentina) Vanesa Furlanetto
February 18, 2013	Sharm el-Sheikh, Egypt; Hard $10,000; Singles and doubles draws	(Slovenia) Anja Prislan (Germany) Jasmin Steinherr; 3–6, 6–2, [10–4]	(France) Clothilde de Bernardi (France) Chloé Paquet	(Chinese Taipei) Lee Pei-chi (Croatia) Adrijana Lekaj	(Romania) Elena-Teodora Cadar (Austria) Barbara Haas (Turkey) İpek Soylu (Argentina) Vanesa Furlanetto
February 18, 2013	Mâcon, France; Hard (indoor) $10,000; Singles and doubles draws	(Germany) Antonia Lottner; 7–5, 7–5	(Italy) Anna Remondina	(Belgium) Ysaline Bonaventure (France) Audrey Albié	(Latvia) Diāna Marcinkēviča (France) Kinnie Laisné (France) Gaëlle Desperrier (France) Sherazad Benamar
February 18, 2013	Mâcon, France; Hard (indoor) $10,000; Singles and doubles draws	(Germany) Antonia Lottner (Russia) Daria Salnikova; 6–4, 5–7, [10–7]	(Italy) Francesca Palmigiano (Italy) Anna Remondina	(Belgium) Ysaline Bonaventure (France) Audrey Albié	(Latvia) Diāna Marcinkēviča (France) Kinnie Laisné (France) Gaëlle Desperrier (France) Sherazad Benamar
February 18, 2013	Shymkent, Kazakhstan; Hard (indoor) $10,000; Singles and doubles draws	(Kyrgyzstan) Ksenia Palkina; 7–6^{(7–3)}, 7–6^{(7–3)}	(Uzbekistan) Sabina Sharipova	(Russia) Karina Isayan (New Zealand) Emma Hayman	(Ukraine) Vladyslava Zanosiyenko (Kazakhstan) Asiya Dair (Uzbekistan) Vlada Ekshibarova (Kazakhstan) Alexandra Grinchishina
February 18, 2013	Shymkent, Kazakhstan; Hard (indoor) $10,000; Singles and doubles draws	(Ukraine) Diana Bogoliy (Russia) Alena Tarasova; 6–4, 1–6, [10–4]	(Kazakhstan) Kamila Kerimbayeva (Uzbekistan) Sabina Sharipova	(Russia) Karina Isayan (New Zealand) Emma Hayman	(Ukraine) Vladyslava Zanosiyenko (Kazakhstan) Asiya Dair (Uzbekistan) Vlada Ekshibarova (Kazakhstan) Alexandra Grinchishina
February 18, 2013	Majorca, Spain; Clay $10,000; Singles and doubles draws	(Italy) Anastasia Grymalska; 6–2, 7–6^{(7–2)}	(Spain) Yvonne Cavallé Reimers	(Russia) Yana Buchina (Spain) Eva Fernández Brugués	(Spain) Sara Sorribes Tormo (Hungary) Réka-Luca Jani (Russia) Yana Sizikova (Italy) Giulia Sussarello
February 18, 2013	Majorca, Spain; Clay $10,000; Singles and doubles draws	(Spain) Leticia Costas (Hungary) Réka-Luca Jani; 6–3, 6–2	(Italy) Anastasia Grymalska (Russia) Yana Sizikova	(Russia) Yana Buchina (Spain) Eva Fernández Brugués	(Spain) Sara Sorribes Tormo (Hungary) Réka-Luca Jani (Russia) Yana Sizikova (Italy) Giulia Sussarello
February 18, 2013	Helsingborg, Sweden; Carpet (indoor) $10,000; Singles and doubles draws	(Latvia) Jeļena Ostapenko; 6–2, 7–6^{(7–3)}	(Sweden) Ellen Allgurin	(Italy) Alice Balducci (Denmark) Karen Barbat	(Italy) Angelica Moratelli (Germany) Kim Grajdek (Denmark) Karina Jacobsgaard (United Kingdom) Anna Smith
February 18, 2013	Helsingborg, Sweden; Carpet (indoor) $10,000; Singles and doubles draws	(Sweden) Ellen Allgurin (Latvia) Jeļena Ostapenko; 6–2, 6–7^{(4–7)}, [10–7]	(Sweden) Cornelia Lister (Netherlands) Lisanne van Riet	(Italy) Alice Balducci (Denmark) Karen Barbat	(Italy) Angelica Moratelli (Germany) Kim Grajdek (Denmark) Karina Jacobsgaard (United Kingdom) Anna Smith
February 18, 2013	Kreuzlingen, Switzerland; Carpet (indoor) $10,000; Singles and doubles draws	(Russia) Ekaterina Alexandrova; 6–4, 6–3	(Switzerland) Timea Bacsinszky	(Germany) Tayisiya Morderger (Liechtenstein) Kathinka von Deichmann	(Switzerland) Xenia Knoll (Switzerland) Lara Michel (Switzerland) Karin Kennel (Czech Republic) Petra Krejsová
February 18, 2013	Kreuzlingen, Switzerland; Carpet (indoor) $10,000; Singles and doubles draws	(Switzerland) Timea Bacsinszky (Switzerland) Xenia Knoll; 6–3, 6–2	(Croatia) Matea Mezak (Croatia) Silvia Njirić	(Germany) Tayisiya Morderger (Liechtenstein) Kathinka von Deichmann	(Switzerland) Xenia Knoll (Switzerland) Lara Michel (Switzerland) Karin Kennel (Czech Republic) Petra Krejsová
February 18, 2013	Antalya, Turkey; Clay $10,000; Singles and doubles draws	(Serbia) Jovana Jakšić; 6–2, 7–5	(Romania) Ioana Ducu	(Romania) Cristina Ene (China) Zhang Kailin	(Germany) Anne Schäfer (Slovakia) Petra Uberalová (Romania) Bianca Hîncu (Italy) Gioia Barbieri
February 18, 2013	Antalya, Turkey; Clay $10,000; Singles and doubles draws	(Hungary) Ágnes Bukta (Slovakia) Vivien Juhászová; 6–1, 2–6, [10–6]	(Romania) Ioana Ducu (Romania) Cristina Ene	(Romania) Cristina Ene (China) Zhang Kailin	(Germany) Anne Schäfer (Slovakia) Petra Uberalová (Romania) Bianca Hîncu (Italy) Gioia Barbieri
February 25, 2013	Nature's Way Sydney Tennis International; Sydney, Australia; Hard $10,000; Singles – Doubles	(China) Wang Yafan; 6–2, 6–0	(Japan) Misa Eguchi	(China) Zhu Lin (Australia) Azra Hadzic	(Japan) Chiaki Okadaue (Japan) Eri Hozumi (Australia) Alison Bai (Japan) Miyabi Inoue
February 25, 2013	Nature's Way Sydney Tennis International; Sydney, Australia; Hard $10,000; Singles – Doubles	(Japan) Misa Eguchi (Japan) Mari Tanaka; 4–6, 7–5, [10–8]	(Serbia) Tamara Čurović (China) Wang Yafan	(China) Zhu Lin (Australia) Azra Hadzic	(Japan) Chiaki Okadaue (Japan) Eri Hozumi (Australia) Alison Bai (Japan) Miyabi Inoue
February 25, 2013	Sharm el-Sheikh, Egypt; Hard $10,000; Singles and doubles draws	(Croatia) Adrijana Lekaj; 4–6, 7–6^{(10–8)}, 6–1	(Argentina) Vanesa Furlanetto	(Romania) Ilka Csöregi (Ukraine) Anhelina Kalinina	(Serbia) Ana Veselinović (France) Chloé Paquet (Romania) Elena-Teodora Cadar (France) Clothilde de Bernardi
February 25, 2013	Sharm el-Sheikh, Egypt; Hard $10,000; Singles and doubles draws	(Romania) Ilka Csöregi (Madagascar) Zarah Razafimahatratra; 7–5, 6–3	(United Kingdom) Naomi Broady (Serbia) Ana Veselinović	(Romania) Ilka Csöregi (Ukraine) Anhelina Kalinina	(Serbia) Ana Veselinović (France) Chloé Paquet (Romania) Elena-Teodora Cadar (France) Clothilde de Bernardi
February 25, 2013	Bron, France; Hard (indoor) $10,000; Singles and doubles draws	(Ukraine) Maryna Zanevska; 6–2, 6–1	(Belgium) Ysaline Bonaventure	(Ukraine) Anastasiya Vasylyeva (Bulgaria) Isabella Shinikova	(France) Constance Sibille (Russia) Alina Silich (Italy) Federica Di Sarra (Belgium) Alison Van Uytvanck
February 25, 2013	Bron, France; Hard (indoor) $10,000; Singles and doubles draws	(France) Sherazad Benamar (France) Pauline Payet; 7–5, 7–5	(Russia) Daria Salnikova (Russia) Alina Silich	(Ukraine) Anastasiya Vasylyeva (Bulgaria) Isabella Shinikova	(France) Constance Sibille (Russia) Alina Silich (Italy) Federica Di Sarra (Belgium) Alison Van Uytvanck
February 25, 2013	Netanya, Israel; Hard $10,000; Singles and doubles draws	(Russia) Natela Dzalamidze; 6–4, 6–3	(Russia) Polina Leykina	(Greece) Maria Sakkari (France) Amandine Hesse	(Israel) Keren Shlomo (Russia) Aminat Kushkhova (Israel) Deniz Khazaniuk (Ukraine) Oleksandra Korashvili
February 25, 2013	Netanya, Israel; Hard $10,000; Singles and doubles draws	(Ukraine) Oleksandra Korashvili (Russia) Polina Leykina; 6–4, 6–2	(Russia) Natela Dzalamidze (Russia) Aminat Kushkhova	(Greece) Maria Sakkari (France) Amandine Hesse	(Israel) Keren Shlomo (Russia) Aminat Kushkhova (Israel) Deniz Khazaniuk (Ukraine) Oleksandra Korashvili
February 25, 2013	Shymkent, Kazakhstan; Hard (indoor) $10,000; Singles and doubles draws	(Russia) Ekaterina Yashina; 6–3, 4–6, 6–2	(Kyrgyzstan) Ksenia Palkina	(Russia) Nadezda Gorbachkova (Uzbekistan) Vlada Ekshibarova	(China) Yang Yi (Russia) Alena Tarasova (Russia) Anna Smolina (Russia) Karina Isayan
February 25, 2013	Shymkent, Kazakhstan; Hard (indoor) $10,000; Singles and doubles draws	(Kazakhstan) Kamila Kerimbayeva (China) Yang Yi; 6–1, 4–6, [10–4]	(Kazakhstan) Dariya Berezhinaya (Ukraine) Vladyslava Zanosiyenko	(Russia) Nadezda Gorbachkova (Uzbekistan) Vlada Ekshibarova	(China) Yang Yi (Russia) Alena Tarasova (Russia) Anna Smolina (Russia) Karina Isayan
February 25, 2013	Majorca, Spain; Clay $10,000; Singles and doubles draws	(Germany) Dinah Pfizenmaier; 6–4, 4–6, 7–5	(Italy) Anastasia Grymalska	(United Kingdom) Amanda Carreras (Hungary) Réka-Luca Jani	(Russia) Yana Buchina (Germany) Lena-Marie Hofmann (Spain) Leticia Costas (Italy) Annalisa Bona
February 25, 2013	Majorca, Spain; Clay $10,000; Singles and doubles draws	(Spain) Leticia Costas (Hungary) Réka-Luca Jani; 6–2, 6–1	(Spain) Lucía Cervera Vázquez (Spain) Carolina Prats Millán	(United Kingdom) Amanda Carreras (Hungary) Réka-Luca Jani	(Russia) Yana Buchina (Germany) Lena-Marie Hofmann (Spain) Leticia Costas (Italy) Annalisa Bona
February 25, 2013	Antalya, Turkey; Clay $10,000; Singles and doubles draws	(Romania) Raluca Olaru; 6–3, 7–5	(Serbia) Jovana Jakšić	(Czech Republic) Barbora Krejčíková (Croatia) Tena Lukas	(Slovakia) Vivien Juhászová (Slovakia) Lenka Juríková (Ukraine) Valeriya Strakhova (Germany) Anne Schäfer
February 25, 2013	Antalya, Turkey; Clay $10,000; Singles and doubles draws	(Italy) Gioia Barbieri (Germany) Anne Schäfer; 4–6, 6–3, [10–4]	(Slovakia) Lenka Juríková (Slovakia) Chantal Škamlová	(Czech Republic) Barbora Krejčíková (Croatia) Tena Lukas	(Slovakia) Vivien Juhászová (Slovakia) Lenka Juríková (Ukraine) Valeriya Strakhova (Germany) Anne Schäfer

=== March ===
Week of	Tournament	Winner	Runners-up	Semifinalists	Quarterfinalists
March 4, 2013	Irapuato, Mexico; Hard $25,000; Singles and doubles draws	(Serbia) Aleksandra Krunić; 7–6^{(7–4)}, 6–4	(Ukraine) Olga Savchuk	(Poland) Katarzyna Piter (Switzerland) Amra Sadiković	(United Kingdom) Anne Keothavong (Bolivia) María Fernanda Álvarez Terán (Canada) Stéphanie Dubois (Belarus) Polina Pekhova
March 4, 2013	Irapuato, Mexico; Hard $25,000; Singles and doubles draws	(Russia) Alla Kudryavtseva (Ukraine) Olga Savchuk; 4–6, 6–2, [10–6]	(Serbia) Aleksandra Krunić (Switzerland) Amra Sadiković	(Poland) Katarzyna Piter (Switzerland) Amra Sadiković	(United Kingdom) Anne Keothavong (Bolivia) María Fernanda Álvarez Terán (Canada) Stéphanie Dubois (Belarus) Polina Pekhova
March 4, 2013	Sydney, Australia; Hard $10,000; Singles and doubles draws	(Australia) Viktorija Rajicic; 5–7, 6–3, 6–2	(Australia) Jessica Moore	(Japan) Kaori Onishi (Australia) Azra Hadzic	(Serbia) Tamara Čurović (South Korea) Lee So-ra (Japan) Haruka Kaji (South Korea) Jang Su-jeong
March 4, 2013	Sydney, Australia; Hard $10,000; Singles and doubles draws	(Australia) Alison Bai (Australia) Tyra Calderwood; 7–6^{(7–3)}, 6–4	(Australia) Anja Dokic (Australia) Jessica Moore	(Japan) Kaori Onishi (Australia) Azra Hadzic	(Serbia) Tamara Čurović (South Korea) Lee So-ra (Japan) Haruka Kaji (South Korea) Jang Su-jeong
March 4, 2013	Sharm el-Sheikh, Egypt; Hard $10,000; Singles and doubles draws	(Russia) Daria Mironova; 7–6^{(7–2)}, 2–6, 7–6^{(7–4)}	(United Kingdom) Naomi Broady	(Turkey) Başak Eraydın (Russia) Alexandra Artamonova	(Argentina) Vanesa Furlanetto (Turkey) Melis Sezer (Romania) Ilka Csöregi (France) Manon Arcangioli
March 4, 2013	Sharm el-Sheikh, Egypt; Hard $10,000; Singles and doubles draws	(Romania) Ilka Csöregi (Madagascar) Zarah Razafimahatratra; 6–3, 6–4	(Russia) Alexandra Artamonova (Belarus) Darya Lebesheva	(Turkey) Başak Eraydın (Russia) Alexandra Artamonova	(Argentina) Vanesa Furlanetto (Turkey) Melis Sezer (Romania) Ilka Csöregi (France) Manon Arcangioli
March 4, 2013	Amiens, France; Clay (indoor) $10,000; Singles and doubles draws	(France) Virginie Razzano; 6–1, 6–0	(France) Alix Collombon	(France) Gracia Radovanovic (France) Céline Ghesquière	(Belgium) Marie Benoît (Netherlands) Bernice van de Velde (Germany) Lena-Marie Hofmann (Croatia) Ema Mikulčić
March 4, 2013	Amiens, France; Clay (indoor) $10,000; Singles and doubles draws	(Germany) Lena-Marie Hofmann (Bulgaria) Isabella Shinikova; 7–6^{(7–5)}, 6–1	(Netherlands) Bernice van de Velde (Netherlands) Kelly Versteeg	(France) Gracia Radovanovic (France) Céline Ghesquière	(Belgium) Marie Benoît (Netherlands) Bernice van de Velde (Germany) Lena-Marie Hofmann (Croatia) Ema Mikulčić
March 4, 2013	Netanya, Israel; Hard $10,000; Singles and doubles draws	(Belarus) Aliaksandra Sasnovich; 6–2, 7–5	(France) Amandine Hesse	(Israel) Deniz Khazaniuk (Russia) Polina Monova	(China) Lu Jiajing (Belgium) Elise Mertens (Spain) Arabela Fernández Rabener (France) Irina Ramialison
March 4, 2013	Netanya, Israel; Hard $10,000; Singles and doubles draws	(Russia) Polina Leykina (Belarus) Aliaksandra Sasnovich; 2–6, 7–6^{(7–4)}, [10–8]	(Russia) Natela Dzalamidze (Russia) Aminat Kushkhova	(Israel) Deniz Khazaniuk (Russia) Polina Monova	(China) Lu Jiajing (Belgium) Elise Mertens (Spain) Arabela Fernández Rabener (France) Irina Ramialison
March 4, 2013	Frauenfeld, Switzerland; Carpet (indoor) $10,000; Singles and doubles draws	(Czech Republic) Kateřina Siniaková; 6–3, 4–6, 6–4	(Liechtenstein) Kathinka von Deichmann	(Czech Republic) Petra Rohanová (Switzerland) Karin Kennel	(Russia) Olga Doroshina (Switzerland) Chiara Grimm (Germany) Bianca Koch (Germany) Tayisiya Morderger
March 4, 2013	Frauenfeld, Switzerland; Carpet (indoor) $10,000; Singles and doubles draws	(Liechtenstein) Kathinka von Deichmann (Switzerland) Nina Stadler; 6–3, 6–4	(Germany) Tayisiya Morderger (Germany) Yana Morderger	(Czech Republic) Petra Rohanová (Switzerland) Karin Kennel	(Russia) Olga Doroshina (Switzerland) Chiara Grimm (Germany) Bianca Koch (Germany) Tayisiya Morderger
March 4, 2013	Antalya, Turkey; Clay $10,000; Singles and doubles draws	(Romania) Bianca Hîncu; 5–2, retired	(Slovakia) Vivien Juhászová	(Hungary) Ágnes Bukta (Czech Republic) Barbora Krejčíková	(Slovakia) Lenka Juríková (Japan) Chihiro Nunome (Slovakia) Chantal Škamlová (Romania) Diana Buzean
March 4, 2013	Antalya, Turkey; Clay $10,000; Singles and doubles draws	(Italy) Gioia Barbieri (United States) Nicole Melichar; 7–6^{(7–2)}, 6–4	(Hungary) Ágnes Bukta (Slovakia) Vivien Juhászová	(Hungary) Ágnes Bukta (Czech Republic) Barbora Krejčíková	(Slovakia) Lenka Juríková (Japan) Chihiro Nunome (Slovakia) Chantal Škamlová (Romania) Diana Buzean
March 4, 2013	Sutton, United Kingdom; Hard (indoor) $10,000; Singles and doubles draws	(Liechtenstein) Stephanie Vogt; 3–6, 6–4, 6–3	(Germany) Carina Witthöft	(Netherlands) Indy de Vroome (Turkey) Pemra Özgen	(Philippines) Katharina Lehnert (Russia) Marina Melnikova (Belarus) Sviatlana Pirazhenka (Italy) Angelica Moratelli
March 4, 2013	Sutton, United Kingdom; Hard (indoor) $10,000; Singles and doubles draws	(United Kingdom) Anna Fitzpatrick (United Kingdom) Jade Windley; 4–6, 7–6^{(7–4)}, [12–10]	(Czech Republic) Martina Borecká (Czech Republic) Petra Krejsová	(Netherlands) Indy de Vroome (Turkey) Pemra Özgen	(Philippines) Katharina Lehnert (Russia) Marina Melnikova (Belarus) Sviatlana Pirazhenka (Italy) Angelica Moratelli
March 4, 2013	Gainesville, United States; Clay $10,000; Singles and doubles draws	(United States) Allie Kiick; 7–5, 6–1	(Czech Republic) Kateřina Kramperová	(United States) Alexandra Mueller (Bulgaria) Viktoriya Tomova	(Bulgaria) Dia Evtimova (Argentina) Andrea Benítez (United States) Mia Horvit (Kazakhstan) Maria Shishkina
March 4, 2013	Gainesville, United States; Clay $10,000; Singles and doubles draws	(United States) Lindsey Hardenbergh (United States) Noelle Hickey; 6–3, 6–4	(United States) Jan Abaza (United States) Nicole Robinson	(United States) Alexandra Mueller (Bulgaria) Viktoriya Tomova	(Bulgaria) Dia Evtimova (Argentina) Andrea Benítez (United States) Mia Horvit (Kazakhstan) Maria Shishkina
March 11, 2013	Bath, United Kingdom; Hard (indoor) $15,000; Singles and doubles draws	(Liechtenstein) Stephanie Vogt; 7–6^{(7–3)}, 6–3	(Belgium) An-Sophie Mestach	(Czech Republic) Tereza Smitková (Germany) Kristina Barrois	(Czech Republic) Sandra Záhlavová (Germany) Carina Witthöft (Romania) Laura-Ioana Andrei (United States) Alexandra Stevenson
March 11, 2013	Bath, United Kingdom; Hard (indoor) $15,000; Singles and doubles draws	(Germany) Nicola Geuer (United Kingdom) Lisa Whybourn; 6–3, 6–4	(Switzerland) Viktorija Golubic (Germany) Julia Kimmelmann	(Czech Republic) Tereza Smitková (Germany) Kristina Barrois	(Czech Republic) Sandra Záhlavová (Germany) Carina Witthöft (Romania) Laura-Ioana Andrei (United States) Alexandra Stevenson
March 11, 2013	Sharm el-Sheikh, Egypt; Hard $10,000; Singles and doubles draws	(Belarus) Darya Lebesheva; 6–7^{(5–7)}, 6–3, 6–0	(Netherlands) Lisanne van Riet	(Madagascar) Zarah Razafimahatratra (Turkey) Melis Sezer	(Russia) Daria Mironova (France) Clothilde de Bernardi (Germany) Franziska König (Latvia) Madara Straume
March 11, 2013	Sharm el-Sheikh, Egypt; Hard $10,000; Singles and doubles draws	(Germany) Franziska König (Germany) Sarah-Rebecca Sekulic; Walkover	(Slovakia) Stanislava Hrozenská (Czech Republic) Alena Poletinová	(Madagascar) Zarah Razafimahatratra (Turkey) Melis Sezer	(Russia) Daria Mironova (France) Clothilde de Bernardi (Germany) Franziska König (Latvia) Madara Straume
March 11, 2013	Le Havre, France; Clay (indoor) $10,000; Singles and doubles draws	(Russia) Daria Salnikova; 6–4, 4–6, 6–2	(Italy) Giulia Pairone	(Chile) Daniela Seguel (Bulgaria) Isabella Shinikova	(Netherlands) Cindy Burger (Italy) Francesca Palmigiano (Germany) Dejana Raickovic (France) Sherazad Benamar
March 11, 2013	Le Havre, France; Clay (indoor) $10,000; Singles and doubles draws	(France) Estelle Cascino (Bulgaria) Isabella Shinikova; 0–6, 7–5, [10–5]	(Germany) Dejana Raickovic (Germany) Laura Schaeder	(Chile) Daniela Seguel (Bulgaria) Isabella Shinikova	(Netherlands) Cindy Burger (Italy) Francesca Palmigiano (Germany) Dejana Raickovic (France) Sherazad Benamar
March 11, 2013	Hyderabad, India; Hard $10,000; Singles and doubles draws	(Portugal) Bárbara Luz; 4–6, 7–6^{(7–5)}, 7–6^{(7–3)}	(India) Ankita Raina	(India) Rishika Sunkara (Thailand) Varunya Wongteanchai	(India) Bhuvana Kalva (India) Nidhi Chilumula (India) Prarthana Thombare (India) Prerna Bhambri
March 11, 2013	Hyderabad, India; Hard $10,000; Singles and doubles draws	(India) Sharmada Balu (India) Sowjanya Bavisetti; 7–5, 5–7, [10–8]	(Germany) Michaela Frlicka (Czech Republic) Tereza Malíková	(India) Rishika Sunkara (Thailand) Varunya Wongteanchai	(India) Bhuvana Kalva (India) Nidhi Chilumula (India) Prarthana Thombare (India) Prerna Bhambri
March 11, 2013	Netanya, Israel; Hard $10,000; Singles and doubles draws	(Belarus) Aliaksandra Sasnovich; 6–3, 3–6, 6–4	(Russia) Polina Vinogradova	(France) Irina Ramialison (Russia) Polina Leykina	(China) Lu Jiajing (Israel) Ekaterina Tour (China) Lu Jiaxiang (Russia) Polina Monova
March 11, 2013	Netanya, Israel; Hard $10,000; Singles and doubles draws	(Russia) Polina Monova (Belarus) Aliaksandra Sasnovich; 6–1, 6–2	(China) Lu Jiajing (China) Lu Jiaxiang	(France) Irina Ramialison (Russia) Polina Leykina	(China) Lu Jiajing (Israel) Ekaterina Tour (China) Lu Jiaxiang (Russia) Polina Monova
March 11, 2013	Metepec, Mexico; Hard $10,000; Singles and doubles draws	(Mexico) Marcela Zacarías; 6–1, 6–1	(Austria) Nicole Rottmann	(Mexico) Ana Sofía Sánchez (Chile) Cecilia Costa Melgar	(United States) Parris Todd (Ukraine) Alyona Sotnikova (Slovakia) Lenka Wienerová (United States) Macall Harkins
March 11, 2013	Metepec, Mexico; Hard $10,000; Singles and doubles draws	(United States) Macall Harkins (Austria) Nicole Rottmann; 6–3, 6–2	(Brazil) Laura Pigossi (Mexico) Marcela Zacarías	(Mexico) Ana Sofía Sánchez (Chile) Cecilia Costa Melgar	(United States) Parris Todd (Ukraine) Alyona Sotnikova (Slovakia) Lenka Wienerová (United States) Macall Harkins
March 11, 2013	Madrid, Spain; Clay $10,000; Singles and doubles draws	(Hungary) Réka-Luca Jani; 6–1, 6–0	(Ukraine) Sofiya Kovalets	(Bulgaria) Aleksandrina Naydenova (Italy) Annalisa Bona	(Spain) Lucía Cervera Vázquez (Greece) Despina Papamichail (Serbia) Marina Kachar (Russia) Marina Shamayko
March 11, 2013	Madrid, Spain; Clay $10,000; Singles and doubles draws	(Russia) Eugeniya Pashkova (Russia) Yana Sizikova; 3–6, 6–3, [10–5]	(Italy) Gaia Sanesi (Italy) Giulia Sussarello	(Bulgaria) Aleksandrina Naydenova (Italy) Annalisa Bona	(Spain) Lucía Cervera Vázquez (Greece) Despina Papamichail (Serbia) Marina Kachar (Russia) Marina Shamayko
March 11, 2013	Antalya, Turkey; Clay $10,000; Singles and doubles draws	(Romania) Cristina Dinu; 6–4, 7–6^{(7–5)}	(Slovakia) Lenka Juríková	(Italy) Carolina Pillot (Italy) Gioia Barbieri	(United States) Nicole Melichar (Ukraine) Alona Fomina (Serbia) Natalija Kostić (Georgia (country)) Sofia Shapatava
March 11, 2013	Antalya, Turkey; Clay $10,000; Singles and doubles draws	(United States) Anamika Bhargava (United States) Nicole Melichar; 6–7^{(7–9)}, 6–3, [10–7]	(Ukraine) Alona Fomina (Georgia (country)) Sofia Shapatava	(Italy) Carolina Pillot (Italy) Gioia Barbieri	(United States) Nicole Melichar (Ukraine) Alona Fomina (Serbia) Natalija Kostić (Georgia (country)) Sofia Shapatava
March 11, 2013	Orlando, United States; Clay $10,000; Singles and doubles draws	(Slovenia) Maša Zec Peškirič; 0–6, 6–4, 6–1	(Belgium) Michaela Boev	(Switzerland) Conny Perrin (Czech Republic) Kateřina Kramperová	(Bulgaria) Viktoriya Tomova (United States) Jamie Loeb (Argentina) Catalina Pella (Bulgaria) Dia Evtimova
March 11, 2013	Orlando, United States; Clay $10,000; Singles and doubles draws	(Czech Republic) Nikola Fraňková (Brazil) Nathalia Rossi; 7–5, 2–6, [10–8]	(Ukraine) Tetyana Arefyeva (Czech Republic) Kateřina Kramperová	(Switzerland) Conny Perrin (Czech Republic) Kateřina Kramperová	(Bulgaria) Viktoriya Tomova (United States) Jamie Loeb (Argentina) Catalina Pella (Bulgaria) Dia Evtimova
March 18, 2013	Ipswich, Australia; Hard $25,000; Singles and doubles draws	(Croatia) Jelena Pandžić; 7–5, 2–6, 6–2	(Australia) Storm Sanders	(Thailand) Noppawan Lertcheewakarn (Japan) Erika Sema	(Japan) Sachie Ishizu (Japan) Junri Namigata (Japan) Yurika Sema (Thailand) Varatchaya Wongteanchai
March 18, 2013	Ipswich, Australia; Hard $25,000; Singles and doubles draws	(Thailand) Noppawan Lertcheewakarn (Thailand) Varatchaya Wongteanchai; 4–6, 6–1, [10–8]	(Australia) Viktorija Rajicic (Australia) Storm Sanders	(Thailand) Noppawan Lertcheewakarn (Japan) Erika Sema	(Japan) Sachie Ishizu (Japan) Junri Namigata (Japan) Yurika Sema (Thailand) Varatchaya Wongteanchai
March 18, 2013	Innisbrook, United States; Clay $25,000; Singles and doubles draws	(Israel) Julia Glushko; 2–6, 6–0, 6–4	(Austria) Patricia Mayr-Achleitner	(Argentina) María Irigoyen (United States) Sachia Vickery	(Russia) Valeria Solovyeva (Paraguay) Verónica Cepede Royg (Spain) Laura Pous Tió (Colombia) Mariana Duque
March 18, 2013	Innisbrook, United States; Clay $25,000; Singles and doubles draws	(Australia) Ashleigh Barty (France) Alizé Lim; 6–1, 6–3	(Brazil) Paula Cristina Gonçalves (Argentina) María Irigoyen	(Argentina) María Irigoyen (United States) Sachia Vickery	(Russia) Valeria Solovyeva (Paraguay) Verónica Cepede Royg (Spain) Laura Pous Tió (Colombia) Mariana Duque
March 18, 2013	Sunderland, United Kingdom; Hard (indoor) $15,000; Singles and doubles draws	(Germany) Anna-Lena Friedsam; 6–2, 7–6^{(7–4)}	(Belgium) Alison Van Uytvanck	(Switzerland) Viktorija Golubic (Croatia) Ana Vrljić	(Republic of Ireland) Amy Bowtell (Romania) Mădălina Gojnea (Netherlands) Indy de Vroome (France) Myrtille Georges
March 18, 2013	Sunderland, United Kingdom; Hard (indoor) $15,000; Singles and doubles draws	(Sweden) Hilda Melander (Sweden) Sandra Roma; 6–0, 6–3	(Republic of Ireland) Amy Bowtell (United Kingdom) Lucy Brown	(Switzerland) Viktorija Golubic (Croatia) Ana Vrljić	(Republic of Ireland) Amy Bowtell (Romania) Mădălina Gojnea (Netherlands) Indy de Vroome (France) Myrtille Georges
March 18, 2013	Sharm el-Sheikh, Egypt; Hard $10,000; Singles and doubles draws	(Austria) Melanie Klaffner; 6–3, 6–1	(Netherlands) Valeria Podda	(Canada) Jillian O'Neill (Serbia) Doroteja Erić	(Germany) Sarah-Rebecca Sekulic (Germany) Kim Grajdek (Slovakia) Natália Vajdová (Oman) Fatma Al Nabhani
March 18, 2013	Sharm el-Sheikh, Egypt; Hard $10,000; Singles and doubles draws	(Germany) Kim Grajdek (Poland) Sylwia Zagórska; 6–2, 6–1	(Spain) Beatriz Morales Hernández (Serbia) Andjela Novčić	(Canada) Jillian O'Neill (Serbia) Doroteja Erić	(Germany) Sarah-Rebecca Sekulic (Germany) Kim Grajdek (Slovakia) Natália Vajdová (Oman) Fatma Al Nabhani
March 18, 2013	Gonesse, France; Clay (indoor) $10,000; Singles and doubles draws	(Germany) Anne Schäfer; 6–1, 2–1, retired	(Czech Republic) Kateřina Vaňková	(Ukraine) Olga Savchuk (Slovakia) Karin Morgošová	(France) Laura Thorpe (Germany) Sina Haas (France) Kinnie Laisné (Moldova) Anastasia Vdovenco
March 18, 2013	Gonesse, France; Clay (indoor) $10,000; Singles and doubles draws	(Netherlands) Cindy Burger (Chile) Daniela Seguel; 6–7^{(6–8)}, 6–3, [10–2]	(Germany) Anne Schäfer (Czech Republic) Kateřina Vaňková	(Ukraine) Olga Savchuk (Slovakia) Karin Morgošová	(France) Laura Thorpe (Germany) Sina Haas (France) Kinnie Laisné (Moldova) Anastasia Vdovenco
March 18, 2013	Hyderabad, India; Hard $10,000; Singles and doubles draws	(Portugal) Bárbara Luz; 2–6, 6–3, 6–1	(India) Ankita Raina	(Thailand) Napatsakorn Sankaew (India) Nidhi Chilumula	(India) Rishika Sunkara (India) Prarthana Thombare (India) Natasha Palha (India) Prerna Bhambri
March 18, 2013	Hyderabad, India; Hard $10,000; Singles and doubles draws	(India) Natasha Palha (India) Prarthana Thombare; 6–1, 6–4	(India) Sharmada Balu (India) Sowjanya Bavisetti	(Thailand) Napatsakorn Sankaew (India) Nidhi Chilumula	(India) Rishika Sunkara (India) Prarthana Thombare (India) Natasha Palha (India) Prerna Bhambri
March 18, 2013	Kōfu, Japan; Hard $10,000; Singles and doubles draws	(Japan) Yuuki Tanaka; 6–3, 6–1	(Japan) Hiroko Kuwata	(Japan) Chiaki Okadaue (South Korea) Lee Jin-a	(Japan) Chihiro Nunome (China) Yang Zi (Japan) Eri Hozumi (Japan) Makoto Ninomiya
March 18, 2013	Kōfu, Japan; Hard $10,000; Singles and doubles draws	(Japan) Akari Inoue (Japan) Hiroko Kuwata; 3–6, 7–5, [10–7]	(South Korea) Han Na-lae (China) Yang Zi	(Japan) Chiaki Okadaue (South Korea) Lee Jin-a	(Japan) Chihiro Nunome (China) Yang Zi (Japan) Eri Hozumi (Japan) Makoto Ninomiya
March 18, 2013	Madrid, Spain; Clay $10,000; Singles and doubles draws	(Hungary) Réka-Luca Jani; 2–6, 6–4, 6–4	(United States) Bernarda Pera	(Slovenia) Nastja Kolar (Spain) Lucía Cervera Vázquez	(Spain) Yvonne Cavallé Reimers (Argentina) Tatiana Búa (Greece) Despina Papamichail (Bulgaria) Aleksandrina Naydenova
March 18, 2013	Madrid, Spain; Clay $10,000; Singles and doubles draws	(Spain) Lucía Cervera Vázquez (Italy) Gaia Sanesi; 7–5, 6–3	(Argentina) Tatiana Búa (Spain) Arabela Fernández Rabener	(Slovenia) Nastja Kolar (Spain) Lucía Cervera Vázquez	(Spain) Yvonne Cavallé Reimers (Argentina) Tatiana Búa (Greece) Despina Papamichail (Bulgaria) Aleksandrina Naydenova
March 18, 2013	Antalya, Turkey; Hard $10,000; Singles and doubles draws	(Spain) Eva Fernández Brugués; 6–2, 6–0	(Romania) Ana Bogdan	(Serbia) Natalija Kostić (Armenia) Ani Amiraghyan	(Georgia (country)) Sofia Shapatava (Russia) Elizaveta Kulichkova (Czech Republic) Pernilla Mendesová (Russia) Julia Samuseva
March 18, 2013	Antalya, Turkey; Hard $10,000; Singles and doubles draws	(Georgia (country)) Oksana Kalashnikova (Kyrgyzstan) Ksenia Palkina; 6–1, 6–3	(United States) Anamika Bhargava (United States) Nicole Melichar	(Serbia) Natalija Kostić (Armenia) Ani Amiraghyan	(Georgia (country)) Sofia Shapatava (Russia) Elizaveta Kulichkova (Czech Republic) Pernilla Mendesová (Russia) Julia Samuseva
March 25, 2013	Open GDF Suez Seine-et-Marne; Croissy-Beaubourg, France; Hard (indoor) $50,000; Singles – Doubles	(United Kingdom) Anne Keothavong; 7–6^{(7–3)}, 6–3	(Czech Republic) Sandra Záhlavová	(France) Stéphanie Foretz Gacon (France) Julie Coin	(Croatia) Ana Savić (Ukraine) Maryna Zanevska (Uzbekistan) Akgul Amanmuradova (Netherlands) Lesley Kerkhove
March 25, 2013	Open GDF Suez Seine-et-Marne; Croissy-Beaubourg, France; Hard (indoor) $50,000; Singles – Doubles	(Germany) Anna-Lena Friedsam (Belgium) Alison Van Uytvanck; 6–3, 6–4	(France) Stéphanie Foretz Gacon (Czech Republic) Eva Hrdinová	(France) Stéphanie Foretz Gacon (France) Julie Coin	(Croatia) Ana Savić (Ukraine) Maryna Zanevska (Uzbekistan) Akgul Amanmuradova (Netherlands) Lesley Kerkhove
March 25, 2013	The Oaks Club Challenger; Osprey, United States; Clay $50,000; Singles – Doubles	(Colombia) Mariana Duque; 7–6^{(7–2)}, 6–1	(Spain) Estrella Cabeza Candela	(Slovakia) Jana Čepelová (Czech Republic) Kateřina Siniaková	(Canada) Sharon Fichman (Czech Republic) Kristýna Plíšková (United States) Julia Cohen (Russia) Marta Sirotkina
March 25, 2013	The Oaks Club Challenger; Osprey, United States; Clay $50,000; Singles – Doubles	(United States) Raquel Kops-Jones (United States) Abigail Spears; 6–1, 6–3	(Paraguay) Verónica Cepede Royg (Spain) Inés Ferrer Suárez	(Slovakia) Jana Čepelová (Czech Republic) Kateřina Siniaková	(Canada) Sharon Fichman (Czech Republic) Kristýna Plíšková (United States) Julia Cohen (Russia) Marta Sirotkina
March 25, 2013	Bundaberg, Australia; Clay $25,000; Singles and doubles draws	(Australia) Viktorija Rajicic; 6–4, 6–3	(Japan) Yurika Sema	(Australia) Sacha Jones (Australia) Storm Sanders	(Australia) Olivia Rogowska (Thailand) Nicha Lertpitaksinchai (Thailand) Nudnida Luangnam (Japan) Erika Sema
March 25, 2013	Bundaberg, Australia; Clay $25,000; Singles and doubles draws	(South Korea) Jang Su-jeong (South Korea) Lee So-ra; 7–6^{(7–4)}, 4–6, [10–8]	(Japan) Miki Miyamura (Thailand) Varatchaya Wongteanchai	(Australia) Sacha Jones (Australia) Storm Sanders	(Australia) Olivia Rogowska (Thailand) Nicha Lertpitaksinchai (Thailand) Nudnida Luangnam (Japan) Erika Sema
March 25, 2013	Tallinn, Estonia; Hard (indoor) $25,000; Singles and doubles draws	(Belarus) Aliaksandra Sasnovich; 7–6^{(7–3)}, 6–2	(Ukraine) Nadiia Kichenok	(Poland) Magda Linette (Slovakia) Anna Karolína Schmiedlová	(Liechtenstein) Stephanie Vogt (Russia) Ksenia Lykina (Uzbekistan) Nigina Abduraimova (United Kingdom) Lisa Whybourn
March 25, 2013	Tallinn, Estonia; Hard (indoor) $25,000; Singles and doubles draws	(Estonia) Anett Kontaveit (Latvia) Jeļena Ostapenko; 2–6, 7–5, [10–0]	(Ukraine) Lyudmyla Kichenok (Ukraine) Nadiia Kichenok	(Poland) Magda Linette (Slovakia) Anna Karolína Schmiedlová	(Liechtenstein) Stephanie Vogt (Russia) Ksenia Lykina (Uzbekistan) Nigina Abduraimova (United Kingdom) Lisa Whybourn
March 25, 2013	Ribeirão Preto, Brazil; Clay $10,000; Singles and doubles draws	(Brazil) Beatriz Haddad Maia; 7–6^{(7–2)}, 6–2	(Argentina) Andrea Benítez	(Paraguay) Montserrat González (Brazil) Laura Pigossi	(Brazil) Eduarda Piai (Brazil) Nathalia Rossi (Russia) Varvara Flink (Brazil) Gabriela Cé
March 25, 2013	Ribeirão Preto, Brazil; Clay $10,000; Singles and doubles draws	(Argentina) Andrea Benítez (Brazil) Carla Forte; 7–6^{(7–2)}, 6–1	(Brazil) Eduarda Piai (Brazil) Karina Venditti	(Paraguay) Montserrat González (Brazil) Laura Pigossi	(Brazil) Eduarda Piai (Brazil) Nathalia Rossi (Russia) Varvara Flink (Brazil) Gabriela Cé
March 25, 2013	Sharm el-Sheikh, Egypt; Hard $10,000; Singles and doubles draws	(Austria) Melanie Klaffner; 6–1, 6–0	(Russia) Natela Dzalamidze	(Austria) Jeannine Prentner (Serbia) Doroteja Erić	(Poland) Sylwia Zagórska (Canada) Jillian O'Neill (Czech Republic) Martina Kubičíková (Poland) Zuzanna Maciejewska
March 25, 2013	Sharm el-Sheikh, Egypt; Hard $10,000; Singles and doubles draws	(Sweden) Rebecca Peterson (Sweden) Malin Ulvefeldt; 6–3, 6–4	(Russia) Alina Mikheeva (Canada) Jillian O'Neill	(Austria) Jeannine Prentner (Serbia) Doroteja Erić	(Poland) Sylwia Zagórska (Canada) Jillian O'Neill (Czech Republic) Martina Kubičíková (Poland) Zuzanna Maciejewska
March 25, 2013	Nishitama, Japan; Hard $10,000; Singles and doubles draws	(South Korea) Yoo Mi; 1–6, 6–1, 6–2	(South Korea) Lee Jin-a	(Japan) Chiaki Okadaue (Japan) Nao Hibino	(Japan) Kanae Hisami (Japan) Akari Inoue (Japan) Shoko Yamamoto (Japan) Eri Hozumi
March 25, 2013	Nishitama, Japan; Hard $10,000; Singles and doubles draws	(South Korea) Han Na-lae (South Korea) Kang Seo-kyung; 6–4, 6–7^{(4–7)}, [10–6]	(Japan) Eri Hozumi (Japan) Makoto Ninomiya	(Japan) Chiaki Okadaue (Japan) Nao Hibino	(Japan) Kanae Hisami (Japan) Akari Inoue (Japan) Shoko Yamamoto (Japan) Eri Hozumi
March 25, 2013	Antalya, Turkey; Hard $10,000; Singles and doubles draws	(Sweden) Ellen Allgurin; 6–0, 3–6, 6–2	(Slovakia) Chantal Škamlová	(Serbia) Natalija Kostić (Philippines) Katharina Lehnert	(France) Victoria Larrière (Russia) Julia Samuseva (Czech Republic) Martina Borecká (Armenia) Ani Amiraghyan
March 25, 2013	Antalya, Turkey; Hard $10,000; Singles and doubles draws	(Georgia (country)) Oksana Kalashnikova (Kyrgyzstan) Ksenia Palkina; 6–4, 4–6, [10–8]	(Turkey) Başak Eraydın (Australia) Abbie Myers	(Serbia) Natalija Kostić (Philippines) Katharina Lehnert	(France) Victoria Larrière (Russia) Julia Samuseva (Czech Republic) Martina Borecká (Armenia) Ani Amiraghyan

== See also ==
- 2013 WTA Tour
- 2013 WTA 125K series
- 2013 ATP World Tour
- 2013 ATP Challenger Tour
- 2013 ITF Women's Circuit
- 2013 ITF Men's Circuit
- Women's Tennis Association
- International Tennis Federation
