= Elina Svitolina career statistics =

Career finals
Discipline	Type	Won	Lost	Total
Singles	Grand Slam	–	–	–
Singles	WTA Finals	1	2	3
Singles	Elite Trophy	0	1	1
Singles	WTA 1000	5	1	6
Singles	WTA 500	2	1	3
Singles	WTA 250	12	1	13
Singles	Olympics	–	–	–
Singles	Total	20	6	26
Doubles	Grand Slam	–	–	–
Doubles	WTA Finals	–	–	–
Doubles	WTA 1000	–	–	–
Doubles	WTA Tour	2	0	2
Doubles	Olympics	–	–	–
Doubles	Total	2	0	2

This is a list of career statistics of Ukrainian tennis player Elina Svitolina since her professional debut in 2010. Svitolina has won twenty singles and two doubles WTA titles.

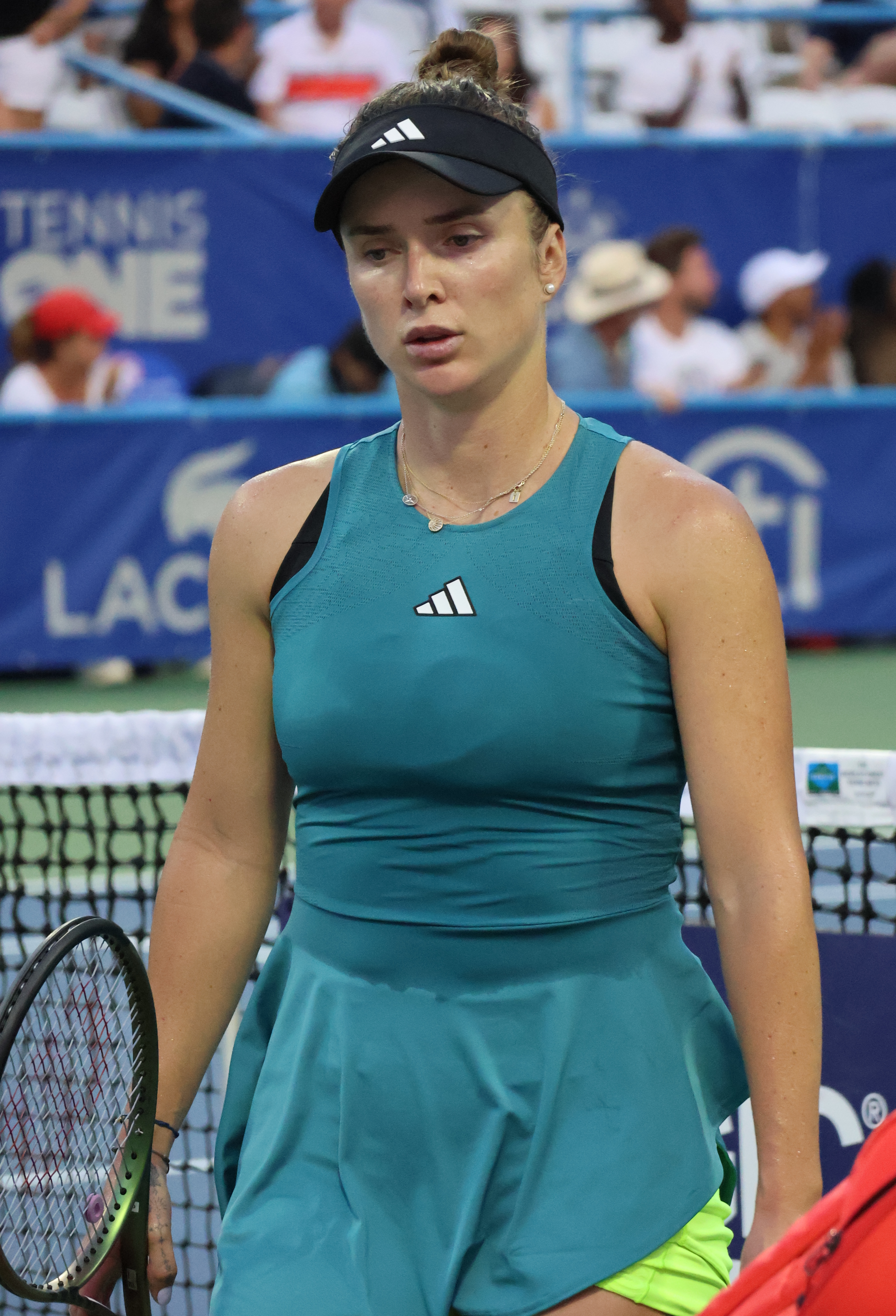
Ukrainian player Elina Svitolina at the 2023 Washington Open

== Performance timelines ==
Key
W	F	SF	QF	#R	RR	Q#	DNQ	A	NH

(W) winner; (F) finalist; (SF) semifinalist; (QF) quarterfinalist; (#R) rounds 4, 3, 2, 1; (RR) round-robin stage; (Q#) qualification round; (DNQ) did not qualify; (A) absent; (NH) not held; (SR) strike rate (events won / competed); (W–L) win–loss record.
To avoid confusion and double counting, these charts are updated at the conclusion of a tournament or when the player's participation has ended.

Only main-draw results in WTA Tour, Grand Slam tournaments, Fed Cup/Billie Jean King Cup and Olympic Games are included in win–loss records.

=== Singles ===
Current through the 2026 Dubai Championships.

Tournament	2011	2012	2013	2014	2015	2016	2017	2018	2019	2020	2021	2022	2023	2024	2025	2026	SR	W–L	Win %
Grand Slam tournaments
Australian Open	A	A	1R	3R	3R	2R	3R	QF	QF	3R	4R	3R	A	4R	QF	SF	0 / 13	34–13	72%
French Open	Q1	Q2	2R	2R	QF	4R	QF	3R	3R	QF	3R	A	QF	4R	QF	QF	0 / 13	37–13	74%
Wimbledon	A	Q1	1R	1R	2R	2R	4R	1R	SF	NH	2R	A	SF	QF	3R	1R	0 / 12	22–12	65%
US Open	A	1R	2R	1R	3R	3R	4R	4R	SF	A	QF	A	3R	3R	1R	3R	0 / 13	26–13	67%
Win–Loss	0–0	0–1	2–4	3–4	9–4	7–4	12–4	9–4	15–4	6–2	10–4	2–1	11–3	12–4	10–4	11–4	0 / 51	119–51	70%
Year-end championships
WTA Finals	Did Not Qualify						RR	W	F	NH	Did Not Qualify					F	1 / 3	10–3	77%
WTA Elite Trophy (Note: WTA Tournament of Champions was held from 2009 to 2014, when WTA Elite Trophy replaced it.)	DNQ		RR	Alt	SF	F	A	A	A	Not Held			DNQ	Not Held			0 / 3	5–4	56%
National representation
Billie Jean King Cup	A	PO	PO	Z1	Z1	A	PO	A	A	PO (Note: Edition split into the two years due to COVID-19.)		A	A	QR	SF	F	0 / 0	9–8	57%
Summer Olympics	NH	A	Not Held			QF	Not Held				SF-B	Not Held		3R	Not Held		0 / 2	10–3	80%
WTA 1000 tournaments
Qatar Open	NTI	A	A	1R	NTI	1R	NTI	3R	NTI	2R	NTI	1R	NTI	A	2R	3R	0 / 7	3–7	30%
Dubai Championships	A	Not Tier I			2R	NTI	W	NTI	SF	NTI	2R	NTI	A	3R	2R	F	1 / 7	16–6	73%
Indian Wells Open	A	A	1R	2R	4R	3R	4R	3R	SF	NH	4R	2R	A	3R	QF	SF	0 / 12	21–12	64%
Miami Open	A	A	Q2	4R	3R	4R	2R	QF	2R	NH	SF	2R	A	2R	4R	3R	0 / 11	16–11	59%
Madrid Open	A	A	A	1R	2R	2R	1R	2R	1R	NH	1R	A	1R	2R	SF	2R	0 / 11	7–11	39%
Italian Open	A	A	A	1R	2R	1R	W	W	2R	QF	QF	A	1R	4R	QF	W	3 / 11	26–9	74%
Canadian Open	A	A	A	A	1R	3R	W	SF	QF	NH	2R	A	1R	2R	QF	SF	1 / 10	20–9	69%
Cincinnati Open	A	A	A	QF	SF	2R	3R	QF	3R	A	2R	A	A	3R	2R	3R	0 / 9	14–9	61%
China Open	A	A	1R	2R	2R	SF	QF	1R	QF	Not Held			A	A	A	QF	0 / 8	14–8	64%
Wuhan Open (Note: Held as Pan Pacific Open until 2013, Wuhan Open since 2014.)	A	A	2R	SF	3R	2R	A	2R	QF	Not Held				A	A	QF	0 / 6	10–6	63%
Win–Loss	0–0	0–0	1–3	10–8	13–9	11–9	21–5	16–8	15–9	2–2	8–7	0–3	0–3	8–7	17–8	26–6	5 / 92	149–87	63%
Career statistics
	2011	2012	2013	2014	2015	2016	2017	2018	2019	2020	2021	2022	2023	2024	2025	2026	SR	W–L	Win %
Tournaments	0	3	19	25	25	23	19	19	22	10	21	8	7	18	15	20	Career total: 254		
Titles	0	0	1	1	1	1	5	4	0	2	1	0	1	0	1	2	Career total: 20		
Finals	0	0	1	1	1	3	5	4	1	2	1	0	1	1	1	3	Career total: 25		
Hard Win–Loss	0–0	0–3	9–12	26–15	25–18	36–16	34–9	33–10	33–16	9–6	31–13	5–8	4–3	16–9	16–10	37–14	12 / 173	314–162	66%
Clay Win–Loss	0–0	0–2	4–6	7–7	14–4	4–4	15–3	9–3	1–3	10–2	8–4	0–0	8–4	10–6	16–3	12–3	8 / 55	118–54	69%
Grass Win–Loss	0–0	0–0	0–2	2–2	1–2	1–2	4–2	2–2	5–3	0–0	2–3	0–0	5–2	4–2	3–2	3–2	0 / 25	23–26	55%
Overall Win–Loss	0–0	0–5	13–20	35–24	40–24	41–22	53–14	44–15	39–22	19–8	41–20	5–8	17–9	30–17	35–15	54–19	20 / 244	467–240	66%
Win %	57%	0%	39%	59%	63%	65%	79%	75%	64%	70%	67%	38%	65%	64%	70%	74%	Career total: 66%		
Year-end ranking (Note: 2010: WTA ranking – 498.)	269	156	40	29	19	14	6	4	6	5	15	236	25	23	14	6	$32,679,541		

=== Doubles ===
Tournament	2013	2014	2015	2016	2017	2018	2019	2020	2021	2022	W–L
Australian Open	A	1R	A	1R	A	A	A	A	A	A	0–2
French Open	A	2R	A	1R	A	A	A	A	A	A	1–2
Wimbledon	A	1R	A	2R	A	A	A	NH	A	A	1–2
US Open	1R	2R	A	1R	A	1R	A	A	A	A	1–4
Win–Loss	0–1	2–4	0–0	1–4	0–0	0–1	0–0	0–0	0–0	0–0	3–10

=== Mixed doubles ===
Tournament	2014	2015	2016	2017	2018	2019	2020	2021	2022	W–L
Australian Open	A	1R	1R	SF	A	A	A	A	A	1–3
French Open	A	2R	A	2R	A	A	NH	A	A	2–2
Wimbledon	3R	1R	2R	A	2R	A	NH	A	A	4–4
US Open	1R	1R	A	A	2R	A	NH	A	A	1–3
Win–Loss	2–2	1–4	1–2	2–2	2–2	0–0	0–0	0–0	0–0	8–12

== Significant finals ==
=== Year-end championships ===
==== Singles: 3 (1 title, 2 runner-ups) ====
Result	Year	Tournament	Surface	Opponent	Score
Win	2018	WTA Finals, Singapore	Hard (i)	(United States) Sloane Stephens	3–6, 6–2, 6–2
Loss	2019	WTA Finals, Shenzhen	Hard (i)	(Australia) Ashleigh Barty	4–6, 3–6
Loss	2026	WTA Finals, Indian Wells	Hard	Mirra Andreeva	5–7, 3–6

=== WTA Elite Trophy ===
==== Singles: 1 (runner-up) ====
Result	Year	Tournament	Surface	Opponent	Score
Loss	2016	Elite Trophy, Zhuhai	Hard (i)	(Czech Republic) Petra Kvitová	4–6, 2–6

=== WTA 1000 tournaments ===
==== Singles: 6 (5 titles, 1 runner-up) ====
Result	Year	Tournament	Surface	Opponent	Score
Win	2017	Dubai Open	Hard	(Denmark) Caroline Wozniacki	6–4, 6–2
Win	2017	Italian Open	Clay	(Romania) Simona Halep	4–6, 7–5, 6–1
Win	2017	Canadian Open	Hard	(Denmark) Caroline Wozniacki	6–4, 6–0
Win	2018	Italian Open (2)	Clay	(Romania) Simona Halep	6–0, 6–4
Loss	2026	Dubai Open	Hard	(United States) Jessica Pegula	2–6, 4–6
Win	2026	Italian Open (3)	Clay	(United States) Coco Gauff	6–4, 6–7^{(3–7)}, 6–2

=== Olympic Games ===
==== Singles: 1 (bronze medal) ====
Result	Year	Tournament	Surface	Opponent	Score
Bronze	2021	Tokyo Olympics 2020	Hard	(Kazakhstan) Elena Rybakina	1–6, 7–6^{(7–5)}, 6–4

== WTA Tour finals ==
=== Singles: 26 (20 titles, 6 runner-ups) ===
Legend WTA Finals (1–2) WTA Elite Trophy (0–1) Premier 5 / WTA 1000 (5–1) Premier (2–1) International / WTA 250 (12–1)	Finals by surface Hard (12–6) Clay (8–0)	Finals by setting Outdoor (17–4) Indoor (3–2)

Result	W–L	Date	Tournament	Tier	Surface	Opponent	Score
Win	1–0	Jul 2013	Baku Cup, Azerbaijan	International	Hard	(Israel) Shahar Pe'er	6–4, 6–4
Win	2–0	Jul 2014	Baku Cup, Azerbaijan (2)	International	Hard	(Serbia) Bojana Jovanovski	6–1, 7–6^{(7–2)}
Win	3–0	May 2015	Rabat Grand Prix, Morocco	International	Clay	(Hungary) Tímea Babos	7–5, 7–6^{(7–3)}
Win	4–0	Mar 2016	Malaysian Open, Malaysia	International	Hard	(Canada) Eugenie Bouchard	6–7^{(5–7)}, 6–4, 7–5
Loss	4–1	Aug 2016	Connecticut Open, United States	Premier	Hard	(Poland) Agnieszka Radwańska	1–6, 6–7^{(3–7)}
Loss	4–2	Nov 2016	WTA Elite Trophy, China	Elite	Hard (i)	(Czech Republic) Petra Kvitová	4–6, 2–6
Win	5–2	Feb 2017	Taiwan Open, Taiwan	International	Hard (i)	(China) Peng Shuai	6–3, 6–2
Win	6–2	Feb 2017	Dubai Open, UAE	Premier 5	Hard	(Denmark) Caroline Wozniacki	6–4, 6–2
Win	7–2	Apr 2017	İstanbul Cup, Turkey	International	Clay	(Belgium) Elise Mertens	6–2, 6–4
Win	8–2	May 2017	Italian Open, Italy	Premier 5	Clay	(Romania) Simona Halep	4–6, 7–5, 6–1
Win	9–2	Aug 2017	Canadian Open, Canada	Premier 5	Hard	(Denmark) Caroline Wozniacki	6–4, 6–0
Win	10–2	Jan 2018	Brisbane International, Australia	Premier	Hard	(Belarus) Aliaksandra Sasnovich	6–2, 6–1
Win	11–2	Feb 2018	Dubai Open, UAE (2)	Premier	Hard	(Russia) Daria Kasatkina	6–4, 6–0
Win	12–2	May 2018	Italian Open, Italy (2)	Premier 5	Clay	(Romania) Simona Halep	6–0, 6–4
Win	13–2	Oct 2018	WTA Finals, Singapore	Finals	Hard (i)	(United States) Sloane Stephens	3–6, 6–2, 6–2
Loss	13–3	Nov 2019	WTA Finals, China	Finals	Hard (i)	(Australia) Ashleigh Barty	4–6, 3–6
Win	14–3	Mar 2020	Monterrey Open, Mexico	International	Hard	(Czech Republic) Marie Bouzková	7–5, 4–6, 6–4
Win	15–3	Sep 2020	Internationaux de Strasbourg, France	International	Clay	(Kazakhstan) Elena Rybakina	6–4, 1–6, 6–2
Win	16–3	Aug 2021	Chicago Open, United States	WTA 250	Hard	(France) Alizé Cornet	7–5, 6–4
Win	17–3	May 2023	Internationaux de Strasbourg, France (2)	WTA 250	Clay	Anna Blinkova	6–2, 6–3
Loss	17–4	Jan 2024	Auckland Open, New Zealand	WTA 250	Hard	(United States) Coco Gauff	7–6^{(7–4)}, 3–6, 3–6
Win	18–4	Apr 2025	Open de Rouen, France	WTA 250	Clay (i)	(Serbia) Olga Danilović	6–4, 7–6^{(10–8)}
Win	19–4	Jan 2026	Auckland Open, New Zealand	WTA 250	Hard	(China) Wang Xinyu	6–3, 7–6^{(8–6)}
Loss	19–5	Feb 2026	Dubai Championships, UAE	WTA 1000	Hard	(United States) Jessica Pegula	2–6, 4–6
Win	20–5	May 2026	Italian Open, Italy (3)	WTA 1000	Clay	(United States) Coco Gauff	6–4, 6–7^{(3–7)}, 6–2
Loss	20–6	Nov 2026	WTA Finals, Indian Wells	Finals	Hard	Mirra Andreeva	5–7, 3–6

=== Doubles: 2 (2 titles) ===
Legend International (2–0)	Finals by surface Hard (2–0)	Finals by setting Outdoor (2–0)

Result	W–L	Date	Tournament	Tier	Surface	Partner	Opponents	Score
Win	1–0	Jul 2014	İstanbul Cup, Turkey	International	Hard	(Japan) Misaki Doi	(Georgia (country)) Oksana Kalashnikova (Poland) Paula Kania	6–4, 6–0
Win	2–0	Jul 2015	İstanbul Cup, Turkey (2)	International	Hard	(Russia) Daria Gavrilova	(Turkey) Çağla Büyükakçay (Serbia) Jelena Janković	5–7, 6–1, [10–4]

== National representation ==
=== Team competition: 1 (runner-up) ===
Result	Date	Tournament	Surface	Partner	Opponents	Score
Loss	Jan 2016	Hopman Cup, Australia	Hard (i)	(Ukraine) Alexandr Dolgopolov	(Australia) Daria Gavrilova (Australia) Nick Kyrgios	0–2

== WTA 125 finals ==
=== Singles: 1 (title) ===
Result	Date	Tournament	Surface	Opponent	Score
Win	Nov 2012	Indian Open, India	Hard	(Japan) Kimiko Date-Krumm	6–2, 6–3

== ITF Circuit finals ==
=== Singles: 8 (6 titles, 2 runner-ups) ===
Legend $75,000 tournaments (2–0) $50,000 tournaments (1–1) $25,000 tournaments (2–1) $10,000 tournaments (1–0)

Result	W–L	Date	Tournament	Tier	Surface	Opponent	Score
Loss	0–1	May 2010	ITF Kharkiv, Ukraine	25,000	Clay	(Ukraine) Lyudmyla Kichenok	2–6, 6–4, 1–6
Win	1–1	Aug 2011	ITF Istanbul, Turkey	10,000	Hard	(Slovenia) Anja Prislan	6–2, 6–7^{(5–7)}, 6–0
Win	2–1	Oct 2011	Lagos Open, Nigeria	25,000	Hard	(Croatia) Donna Vekić	6–4, 6–3
Loss	2–2	Dec 2011	Siberia Cup, Russia	50,000	Hard	(Russia) Yulia Putintseva	2–6, 4–6
Win	3–2	Mar 2012	ITF La Marsa, Tunisia	25,000	Clay	(Bulgaria) Isabella Shinikova	7–6^{(7–4)}, 7–6^{(7–5)}
Win	4–2	Sep 2012	Telavi Open, Georgia	50,000	Clay	(Ukraine) Lesia Tsurenko	6–1, 6–2
Win	5–2	Feb 2013	ITF Eilat, Israel	75,000	Hard	(Russia) Marta Sirotkina	6–3, 3–6, 7–5
Win	6–2	Aug 2013	Donetsk Cup, Ukraine	75,000	Hard	(Hungary) Tímea Babos	3–6, 6–2, 7–6^{(11–9)}

=== Doubles: 6 (2 titles, 4 runner-ups) ===
Legend $75,000 tournaments (1–0) $25,000 tournaments (1–3) $10,000 tournaments (0–1)

Result	W–L	Date	Tournament	Tier	Surface	Partner	Opponents	Score
Loss	0–1	May 2009	ITF Kharkiv, Ukraine	10,000	Clay	(Ukraine) Kateryna Kozlova	(Ukraine) Kateryna Avdiyenko (Russia) Maria Zharkova	7–6^{(7–3)}, 3–6, [9–11]
Loss	0–2	May 2010	ITF Kharkiv, Ukraine	25,000	Clay	(Ukraine) Kateryna Kozlova	(Ukraine) Lyudmyla Kichenok (Ukraine) Nadiia Kichenok	4–6, 2–6
Win	1–2	Jul 2010	ITF Kharkiv, Ukraine	25,000	Clay	(Ukraine) Kateryna Kozlova	(Ukraine) Valentyna Ivakhnenko (Ukraine) Alyona Sotnikova	6–3, 7–5
Loss	1–3	Apr 2011	ITF Tessenderlo, Belgium	25,000	Clay	(Ukraine) Maryna Zanevska	(Germany) Anna-Lena Grönefeld (Germany) Tatjana Malek	5–7, 3–6
Loss	1–4	Oct 2011	Lagos Open, Nigeria	25,000	Hard	(Montenegro) Danka Kovinić	(Austria) Melanie Klaffner (Romania) Ágnes Szatmári	0–6, 7–6, [5–10]
Win	2–4	Jan 2013	ITF Eilat, Israel	75,000	Hard	(Russia) Alla Kudryavtseva	(Italy) Corinna Dentoni (Belarus) Aliaksandra Sasnovich	6–1, 6–3

== Junior Grand Slam tournament finals ==
=== Singles: 2 (1 title, 1 runner-up) ===
Result	Year	Tournament	Surface	Opponent	Score
Win	2010	French Open	Clay	(Tunisia) Ons Jabeur	6–2, 7–5
Loss	2012	Wimbledon	Grass	(Canada) Eugenie Bouchard	2–6, 2–6

=== Doubles: 1 (runner-up) ===
Result	Year	Tournament	Surface	Partner	Opponents	Score
Loss	2010	Wimbledon	Grass	(Russia) Irina Khromacheva	(Hungary) Tímea Babos (United States) Sloane Stephens	7–6^{(9–7)}, 2–6, 2–6

== WTA ranking ==
Year	2010	2011	2012	2013	2014	2015	2016	2017	2018	2019	2020	2021	2022	2023	2024	2025	2026
Highest	487	232	112	39	28	15	14	3	3	3	4	4	15	24	17	13	6
Lowest	1100	505	205	127	47	29	23	14	7	9	7	15	236	1344	34	29	14
Year end	498	269	156	40	29	19	14	6	4	6	5	15	236	25	23	14	6

== WTA Tour career earnings ==
Year	Grand Slam titles	WTA titles	Total titles	Earnings ($)	Money list rank
2010–12	0	0	0	110,107	N/A
2013	0	1	1	330,820	77
2014	0	1	1	672,708	40
2015	0	1	1	1,316,576	25
2016	0	1	1	1,677,851	18
2017	0	5	5	3,263,316	9
2018	0	4	4	5,737,247	4
2019	0	0	0	6,126,335	5
2020	0	2	2	625,299	27
2021	0	1	1	1,296,599	23
2022	0	0	0	262,091	156
2023	0	1	1	1,457,493	26
2024	0	0	0	1,437,638	31
2025	0	1	1	2,213,165	17
2026	0	1	1	1,281,926	4
Career	0	19	19	27,938,997	12

- as of 2 March 2026

== Career Grand Slam statistics ==
=== Grand Slam tournament seedings ===
The tournaments won by Svitolina are in boldface, and advanced into finals by Svitolina are in italics.

Year	Australian Open	French Open	Wimbledon	US Open
2011	absent	did not qualify	absent	absent
2012	absent	did not qualify	did not qualify	not seeded
2013	not seeded	not seeded	not seeded	not seeded
2014	not seeded	not seeded	not seeded	not seeded
2015	26th	19th	17th	17th
2016	18th	18th	17th	22nd
2017	11th	5th	4th	4th
2018	4th	4th	5th	7th
2019	6th	9th	8th	5th
2020	5th	3rd	not held	absent
2021	5th	5th	3rd	5th
2022	15th	absent	absent	absent
2023	absent	not seeded	wild card	26th
2024	19th	15th	21st	27th
2025	28th	13th	14th	12th
2026	12th	7th	8th	9th

=== Best Grand Slam tournament results details ===
Australian Open
2026 Australian Open (12th seed)
Round	Opponent	Rank	Score
1R	(Spain) Cristina Bucșa	52	6–4, 6–1
2R	(Poland) Linda Klimovičová (Q)	134	7–5, 6–1
3R	Diana Shnaider (23)	22	7–6^{(7–4)}, 6–3
4R	Mirra Andreeva (8)	7	6–2, 6–4
QF	(United States) Coco Gauff (3)	3	6–1, 6–2
SF	Aryna Sabalenka (1)	**1**	2–6, 3–6

French Open
2015 French Open (19th seed)
Round	Opponent	Rank	Score
1R	(Belgium) Yanina Wickmayer	78	6–2, 6–2
2R	(Kazakhstan) Yulia Putintseva	99	1–6, 7–5, 9–7
3R	(Germany) Annika Beck	83	6–3, 2–6, 6–4
4R	(France) Alizé Cornet (29)	29	6–2, 7–6^{(11–9)}
QF	(Serbia) Ana Ivanovic (7)	**7**	3–6, 2–6
2017 French Open (5th seed)
Round	Opponent	Rank	Score
1R	(Kazakhstan) Yaroslava Shvedova	45	6–4, 6–3
2R	(Bulgaria) Tsvetana Pironkova	77	3–6, 6–3, 6–2
3R	(Poland) Magda Linette	94	6–4, 7–5
4R	(Croatia) Petra Martić (Q)	290	4–6, 6–3, 7–5
QF	(Romania) Simona Halep (3)	**4**	6–3, 6–7^{(6–8)}, 0–6
2020 French Open (3rd seed)
Round	Opponent	Rank	Score
1R	(Russia) Varvara Gracheva	89	7–6^{(7–2)}, 6–4
2R	(Mexico) Renata Zarazúa (Q)	178	6–3, 0–6, 6–2
3R	(Russia) Ekaterina Alexandrova (27)	31	6–4, 7–5
4R	(France) Caroline Garcia	45	6–1, 6–3
QF	(Argentina) Nadia Podoroska (Q)	131	2–6, 4–6
2023 French Open (protected ranking)
Round	Opponent	Rank	Score
1R	(Italy) Martina Trevisan (26)	24	6–2, 6–2
2R	(Australia) Storm Hunter	204	2–6, 6–3, 6–1
3R	Anna Blinkova	56	2–6, 6–2, 7–5
4R	Daria Kasatkina (9)	**9**	6–4, 7–6^{(7–5)}
QF	Aryna Sabalenka (2)	**2**	4–6, 4–6
2025 French Open (13th)
Round	Opponent	Rank	Score
1R	(Turkey) Zeynep Sönmez	76	6–1, 6–1
2R	(Hungary) Anna Bondár	82	7–6^{(7–4)}, 7–5
3R	(United States) Bernarda Pera	83	7–6^{(7–4)}, 7–6^{(7–5)}
4R	(Italy) Jasmine Paolini (4)	4	4–6, 7–6^{(8–6)}, 6–1
QF	(Poland) Iga Świątek (5)	5	1–6, 5–7
2026 French Open (7th)
Round	Opponent	Rank	Score
1R	(Hungary) Anna Bondár	57	3–6, 6–1, 7–6^{(10–4)}
2R	(Spain) Kaitlin Quevedo	126	6–0, 6–4
3R	(Germany) Tamara Korpatsch	95	6–2, 6–3
4R	(Switzerland) Belinda Bencic (11)	11	4–6, 6–4, 6–0
QF	(Ukraine) Marta Kostyuk (15)	15	4–6, 6–2, 2–6

Wimbledon Championships
2019 Wimbledon (8th seed)
Round	Opponent	Rank	Score
1R	(Australia) Daria Gavrilova	74	7–5, 6–0
2R	(Russia) Margarita Gasparyan	62	5–7, 6–5 ret.
3R	(Greece) Maria Sakkari (31)	32	6–3, 6–7^{(1–7)}, 6–2
4R	(Croatia) Petra Martić (24)	24	6–4, 6–2
QF	(Czech Republic) Karolína Muchová	68	7–5, 6–4
SF	(Romania) **Simona Halep** (7)	**7**	1–6, 3–6
2023 Wimbledon (wild card)
Round	Opponent	Rank	Score
1R	(United States) Venus Williams (WC)	558	6–4, 6–3
2R	(Belgium) Elise Mertens (28)	28	6–1, 1–6, 6–1
3R	(Greece) Maria Sakkari (8)	8	0–6, 7–5, 6–2
4R	Victoria Azarenka (19)	20	2–6, 6–4, 7–6^{(11–9)}
QF	(Poland) Iga Świątek (1)	**1**	7–5, 6–7^{(5–7)}, 6–2
SF	(Czech Republic) **Markéta Vondroušová**	42	3–6, 3–6

US Open
2019 US Open (5th seed)
Round	Opponent	Rank	Score
1R	(United States) Whitney Osuigwe (WC)	109	6–1, 7–5
2R	(United States) Venus Williams	52	6–4, 6–4
3R	(Ukraine) Dayana Yastremska (32)	32	6–2, 6–0
4R	(United States) Madison Keys (10)	**9**	7–5, 6–4
QF	(United Kingdom) Johanna Konta (16)	16	6–4, 6–4
SF	(United States) Serena Williams (8)	**8**	3–6, 1–6

== Longest winning streaks ==
=== 15 match win streak (2017) ===
The 15 consecutive matches won by Svitolina in the spring was the longest win-streak of any player in 2017.

#	Tournament	Category	Start date	Surface	Rd	Opponent	Rank	Score
–	Australian Open	Grand Slam	16 January	Hard	3R	(Russia) Anastasia Pavlyuchenkova	No. 27	5–7, 6–4, 3–6
1	Taiwan Open	International	30 January	Hard	1R	(Russia) Evgeniya Rodina	No. 83	6–0, 6–3
2	Taiwan Open	International	30 January	Hard	2R	(Czech Republic) Lucie Hradecká	No. 170	6–4, 7–5
3	Taiwan Open	International	30 January	Hard	QF	(Tunisia) Ons Jabeur	No. 181	6–1, 3–6, 7–6^{(7–4)}
4	Taiwan Open	International	30 January	Hard	SF	(Luxembourg) Mandy Minella	No. 93	6–3, 6–2
5	Taiwan Open	International	30 January	Hard	F	(China) Peng Shuai	No. 71	6–3, 6–2
6	Fed Cup	Team Event	11 February	Hard (i)	RR	(Australia) Ashleigh Barty	No. 156	4–6, 6–1, 6–2
7	Fed Cup	Team Event	11 February	Hard (i)	RR	(Australia) Daria Gavrilova	No. 26	6–3, 6–2
8	Dubai Tennis Championships	Premier 5	20 February	Hard	2R	(China) Zheng Saisai	No. 95	7–5, 6–1
9	Dubai Tennis Championships	Premier 5	20 February	Hard	3R	(United States) Christina McHale	No. 44	4–6, 6–4, 6–3
10	Dubai Tennis Championships	Premier 5	20 February	Hard	QF	(United States) Lauren Davis	No. 46	6–0, 6–4
11	Dubai Tennis Championships	Premier 5	20 February	Hard	SF	(Germany) Angelique Kerber	No. 2	6–3, 7–6^{(7–3)}
12	Dubai Tennis Championships	Premier 5	20 February	Hard	F	(Denmark) Caroline Wozniacki	No. 15	6–4, 6–2
13	Malaysian Open	International	27 February	Hard	1R	(South Korea) Jang Su-jeong	No. 148	6–2, 6–3
14	Indian Wells Open	Premier Mandatory	6 March	Hard	2R	(China) Wang Qiang	No. 60	3–6, 6–3, 7–6^{(7–3)}
15	Indian Wells Open	Premier Mandatory	6 March	Hard	3R	(Australia) Daria Gavrilova	No. 27	6–2, 6–1
–	Indian Wells Open	Premier Mandatory	6 March	Hard	4R	(Spain) Garbiñe Muguruza	No. 7	6–7^{(5–7)}, 6–1, 0–6

== Wins over top-10 players ==
- Svitolina has a 54–63 record against players who were, at the time the match was played, ranked in the top 10 as of November 14, 2026.

Season	2014	2015	2016	2017	2018	2019	2020	2021	2022	2023	2024	2025	2026	Total
Wins	2	2	5	11	9	4	0	2	0	2	2	4	11	54

No.	Opponents	Rk	Event	Surface	Rd	Score	Rk	Years	Ref
1	(Czech Republic) Petra Kvitová	4	Cincinnati Open, United States	Hard	3R	6–2, 7–6^{(7–2)}	39	2014	
2	(Germany) Angelique Kerber	8	Wuhan Open, China	Hard	QF	6–4, 7–6^{(7–3)}	34	2014	
3	(Germany) Angelique Kerber	9	Brisbane International, Australia	Hard	QF	4–6, 7–5, 6–3	28	2015	
4	(Czech Republic) Lucie Šafářová	7	Cincinnati Open, United States	Hard	QF	6–4, 2–6, 6–0	20	2015	
5	(Spain) Garbiñe Muguruza	5	Dubai Championships, UAE	Hard	2R	7–6^{(7–3)}, 6–3	21	2016	
6	(United States) Serena Williams	1	Rio Olympics, Brazil	Hard	3R	6–4, 6–3	20	2016	
7	(Spain) Garbiñe Muguruza	3	Pan Pacific Open, Japan	Hard	QF	6–2, 4–6, 6–3	20	2016	
8	(Germany) Angelique Kerber	1	China Open, China	Hard	3R	6–3, 7–5	19	2016	
9	(United Kingdom) Johanna Konta	10	WTA Elite Trophy, China	Hard (i)	SF	2–6, 6–1, 6–4	14	2016	
10	(Germany) Angelique Kerber	1	Brisbane International, Australia	Hard	QF	6–4, 3–6, 6–3	14	2017	
11	(Germany) Angelique Kerber	2	Dubai Championships, UAE	Hard	SF	6–3, 7–6^{(7–3)}	13	2017	
12	(Germany) Angelique Kerber	1	Fed Cup, Germany	Clay (i)	PO	6–4, 6–2	13	2017	
13	(Czech Republic) Karolína Plíšková	3	Italian Open, Italy	Clay	QF	6–2, 7–6^{(11–9)}	11	2017	
14	(Spain) Garbiñe Muguruza	7	Italian Open, Italy	Clay	SF	4–1, ret.	11	2017	
15	(Romania) Simona Halep	4	Italian Open, Italy	Clay	F	4–6, 7–5, 6–1	11	2017	
16	(United States) Venus Williams	9	Canadian Open, Canada	Hard	3R	6–2, 6–1	5	2017	
17	(Spain) Garbiñe Muguruza	4	Canadian Open, Canada	Hard	QF	4–6, 6–4, 6–3	5	2017	
18	(Romania) Simona Halep	2	Canadian Open, Canada	Hard	SF	6–1, 6–1	5	2017	
19	(Denmark) Caroline Wozniacki	6	Canadian Open, Canada	Hard	F	6–4, 6–0	5	2017	
20	(Romania) Simona Halep	1	WTA Finals, Singapore	Hard (i)	RR	6–3, 6–4	4	2017	
21	(United Kingdom) Johanna Konta	9	Brisbane International, Australia	Hard	QF	1–6, 7–6^{(8–6)}, 3–2 ret.	6	2018	
22	(Czech Republic) Karolína Plíšková	4	Brisbane International, Australia	Hard	SF	7–5, 7–5	6	2018	
23	(Germany) Angelique Kerber	9	Dubai Championships, UAE	Hard	SF	6–3, 6–3	6	2018	
24	(Romania) Simona Halep	1	Italian Open, Italy	Clay	F	6–0, 6–4	6	2018	
25	(Czech Republic) Petra Kvitová	5	WTA Finals, Singapore	Hard (i)	RR	6–3, 6–3	7	2018	
26	(Czech Republic) Karolína Plíšková	8	WTA Finals, Singapore	Hard (i)	RR	6–3, 2–6, 6–3	7	2018	
27	(Denmark) Caroline Wozniacki	3	WTA Finals, Singapore	Hard (i)	RR	5–7, 7–5, 6–3	7	2018	
28	(Netherlands) Kiki Bertens	9	WTA Finals, Singapore	Hard (i)	SF	7–5, 6–7^{(5–7)}, 6–4	7	2018	
29	(United States) Sloane Stephens	6	WTA Finals, Singapore	Hard (i)	F	3–6, 6–2, 6–2	7	2018	
30	(United States) Madison Keys	9	US Open, United States	Hard	4R	7–5, 6–4	5	2019	
31	(Czech Republic) Karolína Plíšková	2	WTA Finals, China	Hard (i)	RR	7–6^{(14–12)}, 6–4	8	2019	
32	(Romania) Simona Halep	5	WTA Finals, China	Hard (i)	RR	7–5, 6–3	8	2019	
33	(Switzerland) Belinda Bencic	7	WTA Finals, China	Hard (i)	RR	5–7, 6–3, 4–1 ret.	8	2019	
34	(Czech Republic) Petra Kvitová	10	Miami Open, United States	Hard	4R	2–6, 7–5, 7–5	8	2021	
35	(Czech Republic) Petra Kvitová	10	Stuttgart Open, Germany	Clay (i)	QF	6–7^{(4–7)}, 7–5, 6–2	8	2021	
36	Daria Kasatkina	9	French Open, France	Clay	4R	6–4, 7–6^{(7–5)}	192	2023	
37	(Poland) Iga Świątek	1	Wimbledon, United Kingdom	Grass	QF	7–5, 6–7^{(5–7)}, 6–2	76	2023	
38	(Tunisia) Ons Jabeur	10	Wimbledon, United Kingdom	Grass	3R	6–1, 7–6^{(7–4)}	21	2024	
39	(United States) Jessica Pegula	6	Paris Olympics, France	Clay	2R	4–6, 6–1, 6–3	31	2024	
40	(Italy) Jasmine Paolini	4	Australian Open, Australia	Hard	3R	2–6, 6–4, 6–0	27	2025	
41	(United States) Jessica Pegula	4	Indian Wells Open, United States	Hard	4R	5–7, 6–1, 6–2	23	2025	
42	(Italy) Jasmine Paolini	4	French Open, France	Clay	4R	4–6, 7–6^{(8–6)}, 6–1	14	2025	
43	(United States) Amanda Anisimova	7	Canadian Open, Canada	Hard	4R	6–4, 6–1	13	2025	
44	Mirra Andreeva	7	Australian Open, Australia	Hard	4R	6–2, 6–4	12	2026	
45	(United States) Coco Gauff	3	Australian Open, Australia	Hard	QF	6–1, 6–2	12	2026	
46	(United States) Coco Gauff	4	Dubai Championships, UAE	Hard	SF	6–4, 6–7^{(13–15)}, 6–4	9	2026	
47	(Poland) Iga Świątek	2	Indian Wells Open, United States	Hard	QF	6–2, 4–6, 6–4	9	2026	
48	(Kazakhstan) Elena Rybakina	2	Italian Open, Italy	Clay	QF	2–6, 6–4, 6–4	10	2026	
49	(Poland) Iga Świątek	3	Italian Open, Italy	Clay	SF	6–4, 2–6, 6–2	10	2026	
50	(United States) Coco Gauff	4	Italian Open, Italy	Clay	F	6–4, 6–7^{(3–7)}, 6–2	10	2026	
51	(United States) Amanda Anisimova	10	Canadian Open, Canada	Hard	4R	6–2, 6–4	9	2026	
52	(Czech Republic) Karolína Muchová	7	WTA Finals, Indian Wells	Hard	RR	3–6, 6–2, 6–2	6	2026	
53	Aryna Sabalenka	2	WTA Finals, Indian Wells	Hard	RR	6–3, 3–6, 6–1	6	2026	
54	(Czech Republic) Linda Nosková	8	WTA Finals, Indian Wells	Hard	SF	6–2, 6–1	6	2026	

- Key: (Rk) first use, opponent rank; (Rd) round; (Rk) 2nd use, player rank; (Ref) reference; (F) final; (SF) semifinal; (QF) quarterfinal; (#R) rounds 4, 3, 2, 1; (RR) round-robin stage; (Q#) qualifying rounds or stages (3), 2, 1.
