= 2013 Vanessa Phillips Women's Tournament =

- Date: 28 January – 3 February
- Edition: 1st
- Location: Eilat, Israel

Champions

Singles
- (Ukraine) Elina Svitolina

Doubles
- (Russia) Alla Kudryavtseva / (Ukraine) Elina Svitolina
Vanessa Phillips Women's Tournament	· 2014 →

The 2013 Vanessa Phillips Women's Tournament was a professional tennis tournament played on outdoor hard courts. It was the first edition of the tournament which was part of the 2013 ITF Women's Circuit, offering $75,000 in prize money. It took place in Eilat, Israel, between 28 January and 3 February 2013.

== WTA entrants ==
=== Seeds ===
Country	Player	Rank^{1}	Seed
KAZ	Yulia Putintseva	122	1
UKR	Elina Svitolina	127	2
POR	Michelle Larcher de Brito	131	3
ITA	Alberta Brianti	134	4
GER	Dinah Pfizenmaier	139	5
RUS	Marta Sirotkina	146	6
GBR	Johanna Konta	153	7
AUT	Patricia Mayr-Achleitner	165	8

- ^{1} Rankings are as of 14 January 2013

=== Other entrants ===
The following players received wildcards into the singles main draw:

- (Slovakia) Michaela Hončová
- (Israel) Valeria Patiuk
- (Israel) Keren Shlomo
- (Israel) Ekaterina Tour

The following players received entry from the qualifying draw:

- (Italy) Corinna Dentoni
- (Ukraine) Valentyna Ivakhnenko
- (Belarus) Ilona Kremen
- (Czech Republic) Tereza Smitková

The following player received entry by a Protected Ranking:

- (Czech Republic) Renata Voráčová

== Champions ==
=== Singles ===
- (Ukraine) Elina Svitolina def. (Russia) Marta Sirotkina 6–3, 3–6, 7–5

=== Doubles ===
- (Russia) Alla Kudryavtseva / (Ukraine) Elina Svitolina def. (Italy) Corinna Dentoni / (Belarus) Aliaksandra Sasnovich 6–1, 6–3
