= 2013 Vanessa Phillips Women's Tournament – Singles =

Singles
- 2013 Vanessa Phillips Women's Tournament

Final
- Champion: (Ukraine) Elina Svitolina
- Runner-up: (Russia) Marta Sirotkina
- Score: 6–3, 3–6, 7–5

Events
Singles	Doubles
← 2012 ·	Vanessa Phillips Women's Tournament	· 2014 →

This was a new event in 2013. Yulia Putintseva was the top seed, but lost to Marta Sirotkina in the quarterfinals.

Elina Svitolina won the title, defeating Sirotkina in the final, 6–3, 3–6, 7–5.

== Seeds ==
1. (Kazakhstan) Yulia Putintseva (quarterfinals)
2. (Ukraine) Elina Svitolina (champion)
3. (Portugal) Michelle Larcher de Brito (second round)
4. (Italy) Alberta Brianti (first round)
5. (Germany) Dinah Pfizenmaier (first round)
6. (Russia) Marta Sirotkina (final)
7. (United Kingdom) Johanna Konta (quarterfinals)
8. (Austria) Patricia Mayr-Achleitner (second round)

== Main draw ==
=== Key ===
- Q = Qualifier
- WC = Wild card
- LL = Lucky loser
- Alt = Alternate
- SE = Special exempt
- PR = Protected ranking
- ITF = ITF entry
- JE = Junior exempt
- w/o = Walkover
- r = Retired
- d = Defaulted
- SR = Special ranking

=== Finals ===
Semifinals
6	(Russia) Marta Sirotkina	7^{8}	6
(Romania) Cristina Mitu	6^{6}	1
Q	(Belarus) Ilona Kremen	0	2
2	(Ukraine) Elina Svitolina	6	6

Final
6	(Russia) Marta Sirotkina	3	6	5
2	(Ukraine) Elina Svitolina	6	3	7

=== Top half ===
First round
1	(Kazakhstan) Y Putintseva	6	6
(Poland) P Kania	2	1
PR	(Czech Republic) R Voráčová	6	4	5
(Germany) K Wörle	3	6	7
WC	(Slovakia) M Hončová	6	6
WC	(Israel) E Tour	4	4
Q	(Ukraine) V Ivakhnenko	6	0	1
6	(Russia) M Sirotkina	4	6	6
4	(Italy) A Brianti	4	4
(Slovenia) T Majerič	6	6
Q	(Italy) C Dentoni	3	4
(Croatia) T Mrdeža	6	6
(Belgium) A Van Uytvanck	5	6^{2}
(Germany) A-L Friedsam	7	7^{7}
(Romania) C Mitu	7	3	6
5	(Germany) D Pfizenmaier	5	6	2

Second round
1	(Kazakhstan) Y Putintseva	6^{5}	6	7
(Germany) K Wörle	7^{7}	1	5
WC	(Slovakia) M Hončová	6	5	2
6	(Russia) M Sirotkina	4	7	6
(Slovenia) T Majerič	2	1
(Croatia) T Mrdeža	6	6
(Germany) A-L Friedsam	6^{1}	6	6^{2}
(Romania) C Mitu	7^{7}	3	7^{7}

Quarterfinals
1	(Kazakhstan) Y Putintseva	2	6^{4}
6	(Russia) M Sirotkina	6	7^{7}
(Croatia) T Mrdeža	3	2
(Romania) C Mitu	6	6

Semifinals
6	(Russia) M Sirotkina	7^{8}	6
(Romania) C Mitu	6^{6}	1

=== Bottom half ===
First round
8	(Austria) P Mayr-Achleitner	6	6
WC	(Israel) V Patiuk	0	4
WC	(Israel) K Shlomo	0	4
Q	(Belarus) I Kremen	6	6
Q	(Czech Republic) T Smitková	6	7^{7}
(Ukraine) M Zanevska	3	6^{1}
(Romania) R Olaru	7	1	1
3	(Portugal) M Larcher de Brito	5	6	6
7	(United Kingdom) J Konta	6	6
(Israel) J Glushko	4	4
(Russia) E Bychkova	3	2
(Slovakia) AK Schmiedlová	6	6
(Turkey) Ç Büyükakçay	1	5
(Russia) A Kudryavtseva	6	7
(France) V Larrière	3	4
2	(Ukraine) E Svitolina	6	6

Second round
8	(Austria) P Mayr-Achleitner	6	4	6^{6}
Q	(Belarus) I Kremen	0	6	7^{8}
Q	(Czech Republic) T Smitková	6	6
3	(Portugal) M Larcher de Brito	4	3
7	(United Kingdom) J Konta	6	6
(Slovakia) AK Schmiedlová	4	4
(Russia) A Kudryavtseva	5	1
2	(Ukraine) E Svitolina	7	6

Quarterfinals
Q	(Belarus) I Kremen	6	1	6
Q	(Czech Republic) T Smitková	3	6	1
7	(United Kingdom) J Konta	3	1
2	(Ukraine) E Svitolina	6	6

Semifinals
Q	(Belarus) I Kremen	0	2
2	(Ukraine) E Svitolina	6	6
