= 2013 Vanessa Phillips Women's Tournament – Doubles =

Doubles
- 2013 Vanessa Phillips Women's Tournament

Final
- Champions: (Russia) Alla Kudryavtseva (Ukraine) Elina Svitolina
- Runners-up: (Italy) Corinna Dentoni (Belarus) Aliaksandra Sasnovich
- Score: 6–1, 6–3

Events
Singles	Doubles
← 2012 ·	Vanessa Phillips Women's Tournament	· 2014 →

This was a new event in 2013. Alla Kudryavtseva and Elina Svitolina won the title, defeating Corinna Dentoni and Aliaksandra Sasnovich in the final, 6–1, 6–3

== Seeds ==
1. (Poland) Paula Kania / (Czech Republic) Renata Voráčová (quarterfinals)
2. (Ukraine) Valentyna Ivakhnenko / (Russia) Marta Sirotkina (quarterfinals, retired)
3. (Romania) Cristina Mitu / (Romania) Raluca Olaru (semifinals)
4. (Austria) Nicole Rottmann / (Germany) Kathrin Wörle (first round)

== Draw ==
=== Key ===
- Q = Qualifier
- WC = Wild card
- LL = Lucky loser
- Alt = Alternate
- SE = Special exempt
- PR = Protected ranking
- ITF = ITF entry
- JE = Junior exempt
- w/o = Walkover
- r = Retired
- d = Defaulted
- SR = Special ranking

First round
1	(Poland) P Kania (Czech Republic) R Voráčová	6	6
(Turkey) Ç Büyükakçay (Turkey) P Özgen	1	4
(Poland) J Jegiołka (Ukraine) V Kapshay	3	5
(Russia) A Kudryavtseva (Ukraine) E Svitolina	6	7
3	(Romania) C Mitu (Romania) R Olaru	6	6
(Italy) A Brianti (Georgia (country)) M Chakhnashvili	1	2
(Italy) N Clerico (Bulgaria) E Kostova	7	6^{2}	[10]
WC	(Israel) E Masuri (Israel) E Tour	5	7^{7}	[5]
WC	(Israel) J Glushko (United Kingdom) J Konta	7^{7}	6
(Croatia) T Mrdeža (Georgia (country)) S Shapatava	6^{0}	3
(France) V Larrière (Ukraine) M Zanevska	6	4	[10]
4	(Austria) N Rottmann (Germany) K Wörle	3	6	[7]
(Italy) C Dentoni (Belarus) A Sasnovich	6	6
(Slovenia) T Majerič (Israel) K Shlomo	1	0
WC	(Israel) V Patiuk (Germany) D Pfizenmaier	3	1
2	(Ukraine) V Ivakhnenko (Russia) M Sirotkina	6	6

Quarterfinals
1	(Poland) P Kania (Czech Republic) R Voráčová	6^{7}	2
(Russia) A Kudryavtseva (Ukraine) E Svitolina	7^{9}	6
3	(Romania) C Mitu (Romania) R Olaru	6	6
(Italy) N Clerico (Bulgaria) E Kostova	2	3
WC	(Israel) J Glushko (United Kingdom) J Konta	2	5
(France) V Larrière (Ukraine) M Zanevska	6	7
(Italy) C Dentoni (Belarus) A Sasnovich	1
2	(Ukraine) V Ivakhnenko (Russia) M Sirotkina	1^{r}

Semifinals
(Russia) A Kudryavtseva (Ukraine) E Svitolina	4	6	[10]
3	(Romania) C Mitu (Romania) R Olaru	6	4	[6]
(France) V Larrière (Ukraine) M Zanevska	6	2	[3]
(Italy) C Dentoni (Belarus) A Sasnovich	2	6	[10]

Final
(Russia) A Kudryavtseva (Ukraine) E Svitolina	6	6
(Italy) C Dentoni (Belarus) A Sasnovich	1	3
