= Vanessa Phillips Women's Tournament =

ITF Women's Tour
- Event name: Eilat
- Location: Eilat, Israel
- Venue: Eilat Municipal Courts
- Category: ITF Women's Circuit
- Surface: Hard / Outdoor
- Draw: 32S/32Q/16D
- Prize money: $75,000
- Website: www.tennis.org.il

The Vanessa Phillips Women's Tournament was a tournament for professional female tennis players played on outdoor hard courts. The event was classified as a $75,000 ITF Women's Circuit tournament. It was held in Eilat, Israel, in 2013.

== Past finals ==
=== Singles ===
Year	Champion	Runner-up	Score
2013	(Ukraine) Elina Svitolina	(Russia) Marta Sirotkina	6–3, 3–6, 7–5

=== Doubles ===
Year	Champions	Runners-up	Score
2013	(Russia) Alla Kudryavtseva (Ukraine) Elina Svitolina	(Italy) Corinna Dentoni (Belarus) Aliaksandra Sasnovich	6–1, 6–3
