= Corinna Dentoni =

Italian tennis player

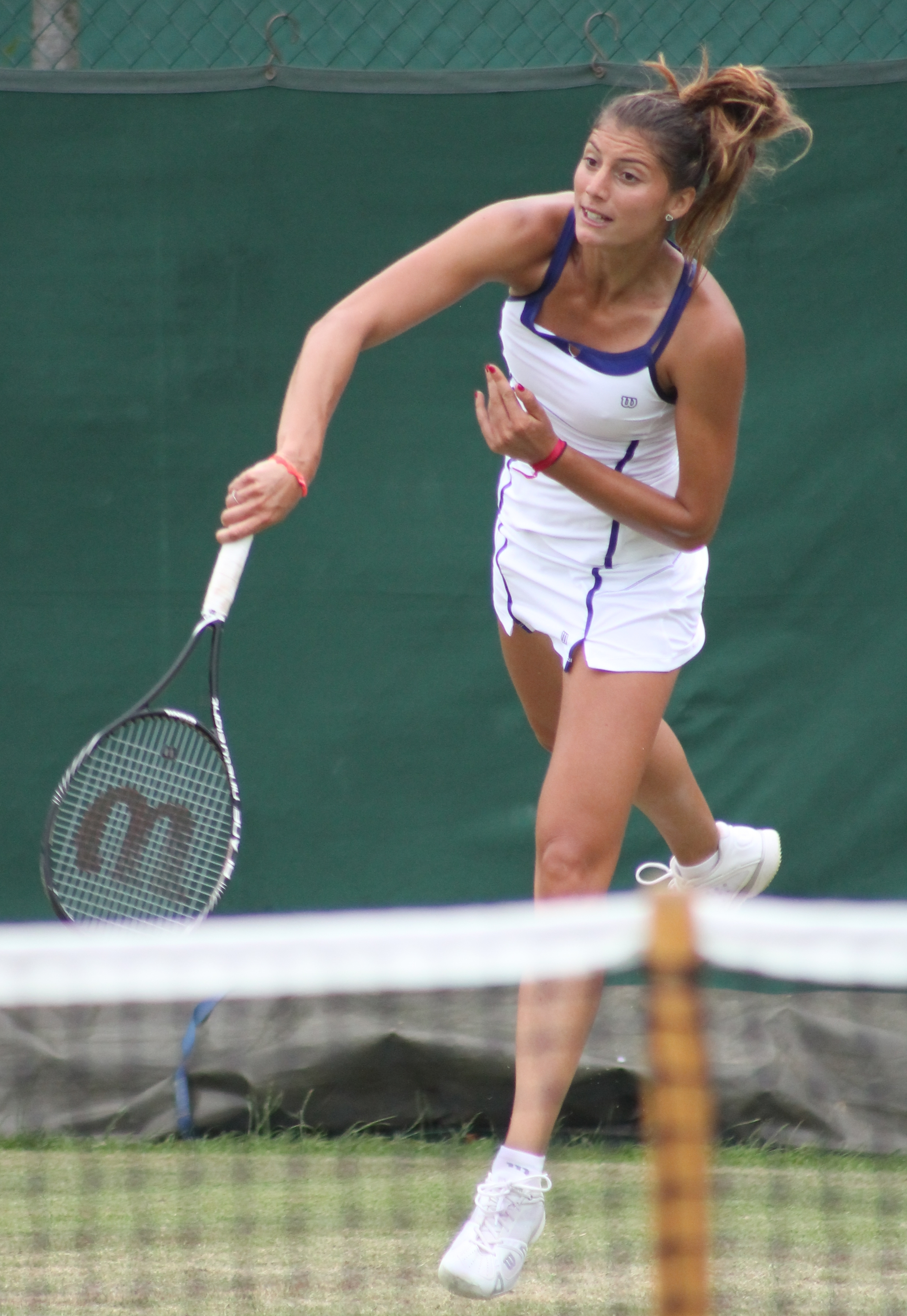
- Corinna Dentoni at the 2013 Wimbledon Championships
- Country (sports): Italy
- Born: 30 July 1989 (age 37) Pietrasanta, Italy
- Height: 1.74 m (5 ft 9 in)
- Turned pro: 2004
- Plays: Right (two-handed backhand)
- Prize money: $396,792

Singles
- Career record: 388–301
- Career titles: 9 ITF
- Highest ranking: No. 132 (22 June 2009)

Grand Slam singles results
- Australian Open: Q3 (2011)
- French Open: 1R (2009, 2011)
- Wimbledon: Q3 (2008, 2013)
- US Open: Q2 (2010)

Doubles
- Career record: 105–107
- Career titles: 6 ITF
- Highest ranking: No. 151 (25 May 2009)

Corinna Dentoni (born 30 July 1989) is a former tennis player with a career-high ranking of 132 in the singles category as well as a tennis influencer.

== Biography ==
Born in Pietrasanta, Dentoni grew up in Milan. She turned pro in 2005 at the age of 16 and qualified for the French Open in 2009.

She withdrew from tennis competition temporarily in the mid-2010s and again in February 2020 during the first COVID-19 lockdown, leading to her retirement from professional tennis. As of December 2023 she has become a tennis influencer. She also plays pickleball.

== Career ==
Dentoni achieved her highest WTA singles ranking of No. 132 on 22 June 2009. Her career-high in doubles is world No. 151, which she reached on 25 May 2009.

Dentoni has won nine singles titles and six doubles titles in tournaments of the ITF Women's Circuit.

== ITF Circuit finals ==
$100,000 tournaments
$75,000 tournaments
$50,000 tournaments
$25,000 tournaments
$10/15,000 tournaments

=== Singles: 16 (9 titles, 7 runner-ups) ===
Result	W–L	Date	Tournament	Tier	Surface	Opponent	Score
Win	1–0	Jul 2005	ITF Monteroni, Italy	10,000	Clay	(Italy) Verdiana Verardi	6–0, 5–7, 6–4
Win	2–0	Sep 2005	ITF Torre del Greco, Italy	10,000	Clay	(Slovakia) Jana Jurićová	6–3, 6–2
Loss	2–1	Oct 2006	ITF Settimo San Pietro, Italy	10,000	Clay	(Italy) Stefania Chieppa	2–6, 3–6
Win	3–1	Apr 2007	ITF Cavtat, Croatia	10,000	Clay	(Argentina) Maria-Belen Corbalan	6–2, 6–2
Win	4–1	Sep 2007	Telavi Open, Georgia	25,000	Clay	(Greece) Anna Gerasimou	6–2, 1–6, 6–0
Loss	4–2	Sep 2007	Batumi Ladies Open, Georgia	25,000	Hard	(Russia) Ksenia Pervak	4–6, 3–6
Loss	4–3	Oct 2008	Taipei Open, Taiwan	100,000	Carpet (i)	(Australia) Jarmila Gajdošová	6–4, 4–6, 1–6
Loss	4–4	Jun 2010	Zlín Open, Czech Republic	50,000	Clay	(Austria) Patricia Mayr-Achleitner	1–6, 2–6
Loss	4–5	Jun 2012	ITF Padova, Italy	25,000	Clay	(Germany) Anna-Lena Friedsam	2–6, 2–6
Win	5–5	Oct 2014	ITF Pula, Italy	10,000	Clay	(Germany) Anna Klasen	6–3, 6–3
Win	6–5	Nov 2014	ITF Casablanca, Morocco	10,000	Clay	(Austria) Pia König	6–2, 7–5
Loss	6–6	Jul 2015	ITF Getxo, Spain	10,000	Clay	(Spain) Aliona Bolsova	0–6, 2–6
Win	7–6	Nov 2015	ITF Pula, Italy	10,000	Clay	(Germany) Julia Kimmelmann	6–2, 6–1
Win	8–6	Nov 2015	ITF Casablanca, Morocco	10,000	Clay	(Austria) Julia Grabher	7–6^{(0)}, 6–3
Loss	8–7	May 2016	ITF Pula, Italy	10,000	Clay	(Russia) Olesya Pervushina	3–6, 6–3, 5–7
Win	9–7	Mar 2019	ITF Tel Aviv, Israel	15,000	Hard	(United Kingdom) Emma Raducanu	6–4, 6–3

=== Doubles: 12 (6 titles, 6 runner-ups) ===
Result	W–L	Date	Tournament	Tier	Surface	Partner	Opponents	Score
Loss	0–1	Jan 2008	ITF St. Leo, United States	25,000	Hard	(Russia) Anastasia Pivovarova	(Argentina) Soledad Esperón (Portugal) Frederica Piedade	2–6, 7–6, [7–10]
Win	1–1	Jul 2008	Pétange Open, Luxembourg	75,000	Clay	(Russia) Anastasia Pivovarova	(France) Stéphanie Foretz (Turkey) İpek Şenoğlu	6–4, 6–1
Win	2–1	Sep 2011	Royal Cup, Montenegro	25,000	Clay	(Argentina) Florencia Molinero	(Montenegro) Danka Kovinic (Montenegro) Danica Krstajić	6–4, 5–7, 6–2
Win	3–1	May 2012	ITF Brescia, Italy	25,000	Clay	(Latvia) Diāna Marcinkēviča	(Croatia) Tereza Mrdeža (Slovenia) Maša Zec Peškirič	6–2, 6–1
Loss	3–2	Sep 2012	ITF Alphen a/d Rijn, Netherlands	25,000	Clay	(Germany) Justine Ozga	(Romania) Diana Buzean (Netherlands) Daniëlle Harmsen	2–6, 0–6
Loss	3–3	Jan 2013	ITF Eilat, Israel	75,000	Hard	(Belarus) Aliaksandra Sasnovich	(Russia) Alla Kudryavtseva (Ukraine) Elina Svitolina	1–6, 3–6
Win	4–3	Feb 2015	GB Pro-Series Glasgow, UK	25,000	Hard (i)	(Italy) Claudia Giovine	(United Kingdom) Tara Moore (Switzerland) Conny Perrin	0–6, 6–1, [10–7]
Loss	4–4	Apr 2015	ITF Pula, Italy	25,000	Clay	(Italy) Claudia Giovine	(Romania) Mihaela Buzărnescu (Romania) Irina Bara	3–6, 6–2, [4–10]
Loss	4–5	Oct 2015	ITF Pula, Italy	10,000	Clay	(Italy) Anastasia Grymalska	(Italy) Alice Balducci (Italy) Martina di Giuseppe	w/o
Win	5–5	Oct 2015	ITF Ramat HaSharon, Israel	10,000	Hard	(Israel) Deniz Khazaniuk	(Israel) Sean Lodzki (Israel) Ester Masuri	6–2, 6–0
Win	6–5	Jan 2016	ITF Hammamet, Tunisia	10,000	Clay	(Belarus) Ilona Kremen	(Canada) Petra Januskova (Italy) Angelica Moratelli	7–6^{(2)}, 5–7, [10–5]
Loss	6–6	Feb 2019	ITF Monastir, Tunisia	15,000	Hard	(Italy) Giulia Crescenzi	(United States) Mary Closs (China) Mu Shouna	5–7, 7–6^{(4)}, [10–12]

== Personal life ==
In 2020, she became engaged to former footballer Massimo Brambati.
