= 2014 Baku Cup – Singles =

Singles
- 2014 Baku Cup

Final
- Champion: (Ukraine) Elina Svitolina
- Runner-up: (Serbia) Bojana Jovanovski
- Score: 6–1, 7–6^{(7–2)}

Details
- Draw: 32
- Seeds: 8

Events
Singles	Doubles
- Baku Cup

Elina Svitolina was the defending champion, and successfully retained her title, defeating Bojana Jovanovski in the final 6–1, 7–6^{(7–2)}.

== Seeds ==
1. (Romania) Sorana Cîrstea (second round)
2. (Ukraine) Elina Svitolina (champion)
3. (Slovakia) Magdaléna Rybáriková (first round)
4. (Japan) Kurumi Nara (first round)
5. (Serbia) Bojana Jovanovski (final)
6. (Austria) Yvonne Meusburger (first round)
7. (United Kingdom) Heather Watson (first round)
8. (Slovakia) Jana Čepelová (second round)

== Draw ==
Key

- Q = Qualifier
- WC = Wild card
- LL = Lucky loser
- Alt = Alternate
- ITF = ITF entry
- PR = Protected ranking
- SR = Special ranking
- SE = Special exempt
- JE = Junior exempt
- JR = Junior Accelerator Programme entrant
- CO = College Accelerator Programme entrant
- NG = Next Gen Accelerator Program entrant
- w/o = Walkover
- r = Retired
- d = Defaulted

=== Finals ===
Semifinals
(Switzerland) Stefanie Vögele	2	6	4
5	(Serbia) Bojana Jovanovski	6	2	6
(Italy) Francesca Schiavone	6	1	4
2	(Ukraine) Elina Svitolina	3	6	6

Final
5	(Serbia) Bojana Jovanovski	1	6^{2}
2	(Ukraine) Elina Svitolina	6	7^{7}

=== Top half ===
First round
1	(Romania) S Cîrstea	6	6
WC	(Tunisia) O Jabeur	3	3
(Romania) A Cadanțu	1	4
(Switzerland) S Vögele	6	6
Q	(Serbia) V Dolonc	6	6
WC	(Russia) K Gaydarzhi	0	2
(Israel) S Pe'er	6	6
6	(Austria) Y Meusburger	2	4
3	(Slovakia) M Rybáriková	4	6^{7}
Q	(Japan) M Eguchi	6	7^{9}
(Poland) U Radwańska	6	0
(Belgium) A Van Uytvanck	1	0^{r}
(Poland) K Piter	6^{4}	6	6
(Czech Republic) Kr Plíšková	7^{7}	3	4
(Austria) P Mayr-Achleitner	6	5	3
5	(Serbia) B Jovanovski	2	7	6

Second round
1	(Romania) S Cîrstea	1	1
(Switzerland) S Vögele	6	6
Q	(Serbia) V Dolonc	6	2	3
(Israel) S Pe'er	3	6	6
Q	(Japan) M Eguchi	6	6
(Poland) U Radwańska	2	1
(Poland) K Piter	3	1
5	(Serbia) B Jovanovski	6	6

Quarterfinals
(Switzerland) S Vögele	6	2	6
(Israel) S Pe'er	2	6	4
Q	(Japan) M Eguchi	6	5	3
5	(Serbia) B Jovanovski	4	7	6

Semifinals
(Switzerland) S Vögele	2	6	4
5	(Serbia) B Jovanovski	6	2	6

=== Bottom half ===
First round
7	(United Kingdom) H Watson	2	6	0
(France) K Mladenovic	6	3	6
Q	(Ukraine) O Savchuk	6^{6}	0
(Croatia) D Vekić	7^{8}	6
(Israel) J Glushko	6	2	7
Q	(Ukraine) K Bondarenko	2	6	5
(Italy) F Schiavone	6	6
4	(Japan) K Nara	2	2
8	(Slovakia) J Čepelová	6	6
WC	(Azerbaijan) N Jafarova	1	0
(France) P Parmentier	6	6
(Romania) A Dulgheru	4	1
Q	(Montenegro) D Kovinić	2	4
(Spain) S Soler Espinosa	6	6
Q	(Uzbekistan) N Abduraimova	2	4
2	(Ukraine) E Svitolina	6	6

Second round
(France) K Mladenovic	2	6	6
(Croatia) D Vekić	6	3	0
(Israel) J Glushko	2	6^{2}
(Italy) F Schiavone	6	7^{7}
8	(Slovakia) J Čepelová	6^{2}	4
(France) P Parmentier	7^{7}	6
(Spain) S Soler Espinosa	5	2
2	(Ukraine) E Svitolina	7	6

Quarterfinals
(France) K Mladenovic	3	6	0
(Italy) F Schiavone	6	4	6
(France) P Parmentier	4	4
2	(Ukraine) E Svitolina	6	6

Semifinals
(Italy) F Schiavone	6	1	4
2	(Ukraine) E Svitolina	3	6	6

== Qualifying ==
=== Seeds ===
1. (Romania) Alexandra Dulgheru (moved to main draw)
2. (Montenegro) Danka Kovinić (qualified)
3. (Serbia) Jovana Jakšić (qualifying competition)
4. (Ukraine) Kateryna Kozlova (first round)
5. (Czech Republic) Kateřina Siniaková (first round)
6. (Russia) Alla Kudryavtseva (qualifying competition)
7. (Belarus) Aliaksandra Sasnovich (qualifying competition)
8. (Russia) Alexandra Panova (qualifying competition)
9. (Croatia) Ana Konjuh (withdrew)
10. (Russia) Ksenia Pervak (qualifying competition)
11. (Serbia) Vesna Dolonc (qualified)
12. (Japan) Misa Eguchi (qualified)
13. (Uzbekistan) Nigina Abduraimova (qualified)
14. (Georgia (country)) Sofia Shapatava (first round, withdrew)

=== Qualifiers ===
1. (Uzbekistan) Nigina Abduraimova
2. (Montenegro) Danka Kovinić
3. (Ukraine) Kateryna Bondarenko
4. (Ukraine) Olga Savchuk
5. (Japan) Misa Eguchi
6. (Serbia) Vesna Dolonc

=== Draw ===
==== First qualifier ====
First round
13	(Uzbekistan) Nigina Abduraimova	6	6
WC	(Georgia (country)) Tamari Chalaganidze	2	2
WC	(Azerbaijan) Zuleykha Safarova	2	1
7	(Belarus) Aliaksandra Sasnovich	6	6

Qualifying competition
13	(Uzbekistan) Nigina Abduraimova	5	6	6
7	(Belarus) Aliaksandra Sasnovich	7	3	2

==== Second qualifier ====
First round
2/WC	(Montenegro) Danka Kovinić	6	6
(United States) Julia Cohen	1	2
WC	(Ukraine) Oleksandra Korashvili	4	1
8	(Russia) Alexandra Panova	6	6

Qualifying competition
2/WC	(Montenegro) Danka Kovinić	6	4	7
8	(Russia) Alexandra Panova	2	6	5

==== Third qualifier ====
First round
3	(Serbia) Jovana Jakšić	7^{7}	6
Alt	(Romania) Raluca Olaru	6^{3}	1
(Ukraine) Kateryna Bondarenko	w/o
14	(Georgia (country)) Sofia Shapatava

Qualifying competition
3	(Serbia) Jovana Jakšić	3	3
(Ukraine) Kateryna Bondarenko	6	6

==== Fourth qualifier ====
First round
4	(Ukraine) Kateryna Kozlova	2	0
(Ukraine) Olga Savchuk	6	6
(Russia) Elizaveta Kulichkova	4	3
10	(Russia) Ksenia Pervak	6	6

Qualifying competition
(Ukraine) Olga Savchuk	0	7^{7}	6
10	(Russia) Ksenia Pervak	6	6^{2}	0

==== Fifth qualifier ====
First round
5	(Czech Republic) Kateřina Siniaková	6	4	1
(France) Amandine Hesse	3	6	6
(United States) Nicole Melichar	3	4
12	(Japan) Misa Eguchi	6	6

Qualifying competition
(France) Amandine Hesse	2	3
12	(Japan) Misa Eguchi	6	6

==== Sixth qualifier ====
First round
6	(Russia) Alla Kudryavtseva	6	4	6
(Czech Republic) Tereza Martincová	3	6	3
Alt	(Ukraine) Alona Fomina	3	0
11	(Serbia) Vesna Dolonc	6	6

Qualifying competition
6	(Russia) Alla Kudryavtseva	2	3
11	(Serbia) Vesna Dolonc	6	6
