= 2014 Baku Cup – Doubles =

Doubles
- 2014 Baku Cup

Final
- Champions: (Russia) Alexandra Panova (United Kingdom) Heather Watson
- Runners-up: (Romania) Raluca Olaru (Israel) Shahar Pe'er
- Score: 6–2, 7–6^{(7–3)}

Details
- Draw: 15
- Seeds: 4

Events
Singles	Doubles
- Baku Cup

Irina Buryachok and Oksana Kalashnikova were the defending champions, but Buryachok decided not to participate. Kalashnikova played alongside Olga Savchuk, but lost in the semifinals to Alexandra Panova and Heather Watson.
Alexandra Panova and Heather Watson won the title, defeating Raluca Olaru and Shahar Pe'er in the final, 6–2, 7–6^{(7–3)}.

== Seeds ==
1. (Georgia (country)) Oksana Kalashnikova / (Ukraine) Olga Savchuk (semifinals)
2. (Slovakia) Janette Husárová / (Poland) Klaudia Jans-Ignacik (first round)
3. (Romania) Raluca Olaru / (Israel) Shahar Pe'er (final)
4. (Israel) Julia Glushko / (Austria) Sandra Klemenschits (first round)

== Draw ==
Key

- Q = Qualifier
- WC = Wild card
- LL = Lucky loser
- Alt = Alternate
- ITF = ITF entry
- PR = Protected ranking
- SR = Special ranking
- SE = Special exempt
- JE = Junior exempt
- JR = Junior Accelerator Programme entrant
- CO = College Accelerator Programme entrant
- NG = Next Gen Accelerator Program entrant
- w/o = Walkover
- r = Retired
- d = Defaulted

=== Draw ===
First round
(Uzbekistan) N Abduraimova (Ukraine) A Fomina	6	4	[10]
(Japan) M Eguchi (Austria) P Mayr-Achleitner	2	6	[5]
4	(Israel) J Glushko (Austria) S Klemenschits	4	0
(Ukraine) K Bondarenko (United States) N Melichar	6	6
(Russia) A Panova (United Kingdom) H Watson	6	5	[11]
(Serbia) B Jovanovski (Montenegro) D Kovinić	4	7	[9]
(France) A Hesse (France) P Parmentier	6	2	[12]
(Belarus) A Sasnovich (Czech Republic) K Siniaková	2	6	[10]
(Romania) A Cadanțu (Poland) K Piter	6	3	[4]
3	(Romania) R Olaru (Israel) S Pe'er	3	6	[10]
WC	(Georgia (country)) T Chalaganidze (Azerbaijan) N Jafarova	0	0
WC	(Ukraine) O Korashvili (Czech Republic) T Martincová	6	6
(Italy) F Schiavone (Switzerland) S Vögele	3	6	[10]
2	(Slovakia) J Husárová (Poland) K Jans-Ignacik	6	4	[2]

Quarterfinals
1	(Georgia (country)) O Kalashnikova (Ukraine) O Savchuk	6	6
(Uzbekistan) N Abduraimova (Ukraine) A Fomina	3	2
(Ukraine) K Bondarenko (United States) N Melichar	6^{5}	4
(Russia) A Panova (United Kingdom) H Watson	7^{7}	6
(France) A Hesse (France) P Parmentier	1	1
3	(Romania) R Olaru (Israel) S Pe'er	6	6
WC	(Ukraine) O Korashvili (Czech Republic) T Martincová	2	3
(Italy) F Schiavone (Switzerland) S Vögele	6	6

Semifinals
1	(Georgia (country)) O Kalashnikova (Ukraine) O Savchuk	5	2
(Russia) A Panova (United Kingdom) H Watson	7	6
3	(Romania) R Olaru (Israel) S Pe'er	4
(Italy) F Schiavone (Switzerland) S Vögele	3^{r}

Final
(Russia) A Panova (United Kingdom) H Watson	6	7^{7}
3	(Romania) R Olaru (Israel) S Pe'er	2	6^{3}
