= 2013 Baku Cup – Doubles =

Doubles
- 2013 Baku Cup

Final
- Champions: (Ukraine) Irina Buryachok (Georgia (country)) Oksana Kalashnikova
- Runners-up: (Greece) Eleni Daniilidou (Serbia) Aleksandra Krunić
- Score: 4–6, 7–6^{(7–3)}, [10–4]

Details
- Draw: 16
- Seeds: 4

Events
Singles	Doubles
- Baku Cup

Irina Buryachok and Valeria Solovyeva were the defending champions, but Solovyeva decided not to participate.
Buryachok successfully defended the title alongside Oksana Kalashnikova, defeating Eleni Daniilidou and Aleksandra Krunić in the final, 4–6, 7–6^{(7–3)}, [10–4].

== Seeds ==
1. (Luxembourg) Mandy Minella / (South Africa) Chanelle Scheepers (first round)
2. (Ukraine) Irina Buryachok / (Georgia (country)) Oksana Kalashnikova (champions)
3. (Austria) Sandra Klemenschits / (Slovenia) Andreja Klepač (semifinals)
4. (Czech Republic) Karolína Plíšková / (Czech Republic) Kristýna Plíšková (semifinals)

== Draw ==
Key

- Q = Qualifier
- WC = Wild card
- LL = Lucky loser
- Alt = Alternate
- ITF = ITF entry
- PR = Protected ranking
- SR = Special ranking
- SE = Special exempt
- JE = Junior exempt
- JR = Junior Accelerator Programme entrant
- CO = College Accelerator Programme entrant
- NG = Next Gen Accelerator Program entrant
- w/o = Walkover
- r = Retired
- d = Defaulted

=== Draw ===
First round
1	(Luxembourg) M Minella (South Africa) C Scheepers	6	3	[8]
(Poland) M Linette (Ukraine) E Svitolina	2	6	[10]
(Italy) A Brianti (Israel) S Pe'er	6	4	[8]
(Greece) E Daniilidou (Serbia) A Krunić	4	6	[10]
3	(Austria) S Klemenschits (Slovenia) A Klepač	6	6
(Ukraine) V Ivakhnenko (Ukraine) K Kozlova	4	3
(Netherlands) M Krajicek (Russia) E Yashina	7^{7}	6
(United States) J Cohen (Belarus) P Pekhova	6^{1}	2
(Serbia) V Dolonc (Georgia (country)) A Tatishvili	6	6
WC	(Azerbaijan) K Farhad (Uzbekistan) S Sharipova	1	1
(Uzbekistan) N Abduraimova (Ukraine) V Kapshay	2	2
4	(Czech Republic) Ka Plíšková (Czech Republic) Kr Plíšková	6	6
(Belarus) I Kremen (Russia) M Melnikova	6	6
WC	(Georgia (country)) T Chalaganidze (Azerbaijan) N Jafarova	2	0
(Romania) A Cadanțu (Spain) I Ferrer Suárez	1	2
2	(Ukraine) I Buryachok (Georgia (country)) O Kalashnikova	6	6

Quarterfinals
(Poland) M Linette (Ukraine) E Svitolina	6^{4}	1
(Greece) E Daniilidou (Serbia) A Krunić	7^{7}	6
3	(Austria) S Klemenschits (Slovenia) A Klepač	6	6
(Netherlands) M Krajicek (Russia) E Yashina	1	4
(Serbia) V Dolonc (Georgia (country)) A Tatishvili	3	6	[7]
4	(Czech Republic) Ka Plíšková (Czech Republic) Kr Plíšková	6	3	[10]
(Belarus) I Kremen (Russia) M Melnikova	4	5
2	(Ukraine) I Buryachok (Georgia (country)) O Kalashnikova	6	7

Semifinals
(Greece) E Daniilidou (Serbia) A Krunić	6	6
3	(Austria) S Klemenschits (Slovenia) A Klepač	4	3
4	(Czech Republic) Ka Plíšková (Czech Republic) Kr Plíšková	1	4
2	(Ukraine) I Buryachok (Georgia (country)) O Kalashnikova	6	6

Final
(Greece) E Daniilidou (Serbia) A Krunić	6	6^{3}	[4]
2	(Ukraine) I Buryachok (Georgia (country)) O Kalashnikova	4	7^{7}	[10]
