= 2014 Baku Cup =

- Date: 21–27 July
- Edition: 4th
- Category: WTA International
- Draw: 32S / 15D
- Surface: Hard / outdoor
- Location: Baku, Azerbaijan

Champions

Singles
- (Ukraine) Elina Svitolina

Doubles
- (Russia) Alexandra Panova / (United Kingdom) Heather Watson
- Baku Cup

The 2014 Baku Cup was a professional tennis tournament played on hard courts. This was the fourth edition of the tournament, which was part of the 2014 WTA Tour. It took place in Baku, Azerbaijan between 21 July and 27 July 2014. Second-seeded Elina Svitolina won the singles title..

== Finals ==
=== Singles ===
- (Ukraine) Elina Svitolina defeated (Serbia) Bojana Jovanovski, 6–1, 7–6^{(7–2)}

=== Doubles ===
- (Russia) Alexandra Panova / (United Kingdom) Heather Watson defeated (Romania) Raluca Olaru / (Israel) Shahar Pe'er, 6–2, 7–6^{(7–3)}

== Points and prize money ==
=== Point distribution ===
Event	W	F	SF	QF	Round of 16	Round of 32	Q	Q2	Q1
Singles	280	180	110	60	30	1	18	12	1
Doubles	280	180	110	60	1	—N/a	—N/a	—N/a	—N/a

=== Prize money ===
Event	W	F	SF	QF	Round of 16	Round of 32	Q2	Q1
Singles	$43,000	$21,400	$11,500	$6,175	$3,400	$2,100	$1,020	$600
Doubles	$12,300	$6,400	$3,435	$1,820	$960	—N/a	—N/a	—N/a

== Singles main-draw entrants ==
=== Seeds ===
Country	Player	Rank^{1}	Seed
ROU	Sorana Cîrstea	29	1
UKR	Elina Svitolina	35	2
SVK	Magdaléna Rybáriková	37	3
JPN	Kurumi Nara	38	4
SRB	Bojana Jovanovski	40	5
AUT	Yvonne Meusburger	42	6
GBR	Heather Watson	57	7
SVK	Jana Čepelová	71	8

- ^{1} Rankings are as of July 14, 2014

=== Other entrants ===
The following players received wildcards into the singles main draw:

- (Russia) Ksenia Gaydarzhi
- (Tunisia) Ons Jabeur
- (Azerbaijan) Nazrin Jafarova

The following players received entry from the qualifying draw:

- (Uzbekistan) Nigina Abduraimova
- (Ukraine) Kateryna Bondarenko
- (Serbia) Vesna Dolonc
- (Japan) Misa Eguchi
- (Montenegro) Danka Kovinić
- (Ukraine) Olga Savchuk

=== Withdrawals ===
Before the tournament

- (Germany) Mona Barthel
- (Czech Republic) Klára Koukalová
- (China) Zhang Shuai

=== Retirements ===
- (Belgium) Alison Van Uytvanck (gastrointestinal illness)

== Doubles main-draw entrants ==
=== Seeds ===
Country	Player	Country	Player	Rank^{1}	Seed
GEO	Oksana Kalashnikova	UKR	Olga Savchuk	130	1
SVK	Janette Husárová	POL	Klaudia Jans-Ignacik	145	2
ROU	Raluca Olaru	ISR	Shahar Pe'er	191	3
ISR	Julia Glushko	AUT	Sandra Klemenschits	222	4

- ^{1} Rankings are as of July 14, 2014

=== Other entrants ===
The following pairs received wildcards into the doubles main draw:

- (Georgia (country)) Tamari Chalaganidze / (Azerbaijan) Nazrin Šafářová
- (Ukraine) Oleksandra Korashvili / (Czech Republic) Tereza Martincová

=== Retirements ===
- (Italy) Francesca Schiavone (right lower leg injury)
