= 2013 Baku Cup – Singles =

Singles
- 2013 Baku Cup

Final
- Champion: (Ukraine) Elina Svitolina
- Runner-up: (Israel) Shahar Pe'er
- Score: 6–4, 6–4

Details
- Draw: 32
- Seeds: 8

Events
Singles	Doubles
- Baku Cup

Bojana Jovanovski was the defending champion, but lost in the second round to Ons Jabeur.
Elina Svitolina won the title, defeating Shahar Pe'er in the final 6–4, 6–4.

== Seeds ==
1. (Serbia) Bojana Jovanovski (second round)
2. (Croatia) Donna Vekić (quarterfinals)
3. (South Africa) Chanelle Scheepers (second round)
4. (Romania) Alexandra Cadanțu (semifinals)
5. (Czech Republic) Karolína Plíšková (first round)
6. (Slovenia) Polona Hercog (first round)
7. (Ukraine) Elina Svitolina (champion)
8. (Serbia) Vesna Dolonc (first round)

== Draw ==
Key

- Q = Qualifier
- WC = Wild card
- LL = Lucky loser
- Alt = Alternate
- ITF = ITF entry
- PR = Protected ranking
- SR = Special ranking
- SE = Special exempt
- JE = Junior exempt
- JR = Junior Accelerator Programme entrant
- CO = College Accelerator Programme entrant
- NG = Next Gen Accelerator Program entrant
- w/o = Walkover
- r = Retired
- d = Defaulted

=== Finals ===
Semifinals
Q	(Poland) Magda Linette	1	1
(Israel) Shahar Pe'er	6	6
4	(Romania) Alexandra Cadanțu	1	4
7	(Ukraine) Elina Svitolina	6	6

Final
(Israel) Shahar Pe'er	4	4
7	(Ukraine) Elina Svitolina	6	6

=== Top half ===
First round
1	(Serbia) B Jovanovski	6	6
(Uzbekistan) N Abduraimova	3	3
WC	(Tunisia) O Jabeur	6	6
(Russia) D Gavrilova	4	0
Q	(Poland) M Linette	6	6
(United States) J Cohen	2	3
(Czech Republic) Kr Plíšková	6	6
8	(Serbia) V Dolonc	1	2
3	(South Africa) C Scheepers	3	6	6
(Czech Republic) A Hlaváčková	6	3	4
(Israel) S Pe'er	3	6	6
(Belarus) I Kremen	6	2	0
Q	(Georgia (country)) O Kalashnikova	3	7^{7}	1
Q	(Czech Republic) T Martincová	6	6^{1}	6
(Slovenia) T Majerič	7	6
5	(Czech Republic) Ka Plíšková	5	4

Second round
1	(Serbia) B Jovanovski	2	5
WC	(Tunisia) O Jabeur	6	7
Q	(Poland) M Linette	3	6	6
(Czech Republic) Kr Plíšková	6	1	2
3	(South Africa) C Scheepers	6	5	3
(Israel) S Pe'er	2	7	6
Q	(Czech Republic) T Martincová	6^{5}	3
(Slovenia) T Majerič	7^{7}	6

Quarterfinals
WC	(Tunisia) O Jabeur	6	4^{r}
Q	(Poland) M Linette	3	1
(Israel) S Pe'er	6	6
(Slovenia) T Majerič	0	4

Semifinals
Q	(Poland) M Linette	1	1
(Israel) S Pe'er	6	6

=== Bottom half ===
First round
6	(Slovenia) P Hercog	6^{7}	6	3
(Kazakhstan) G Voskoboeva	7^{9}	4	6
(Greece) E Daniilidou	2	6	4
Q	(Ukraine) K Kozlova	6	3	6
WC	(Azerbaijan) K Farhad	0	0
(Luxembourg) M Minella	6	6
PR	(Netherlands) M Krajicek	6	0	3
4	(Romania) A Cadanțu	2	6	6
7	(Ukraine) E Svitolina	6	4	6
(Serbia) A Krunić	3	6	2
(Italy) N Burnett	6	6
(Georgia (country)) A Tatishvili	2	3
Q	(Ukraine) V Kapshay	7^{8}	0	0
Q	(Ukraine) T Arefyeva	6^{6}	6	6
WC	(Azerbaijan) N Jafarova	1	0
2	(Croatia) D Vekić	6	6

Second round
(Kazakhstan) G Voskoboeva	4	6	6
Q	(Ukraine) K Kozlova	6	3	1
(Luxembourg) M Minella	7	1	3
4	(Romania) A Cadanțu	5	6	6
7	(Ukraine) E Svitolina	6	7^{7}
(Italy) N Burnett	0	6^{3}
Q	(Ukraine) T Arefyeva	1	2
2	(Croatia) D Vekić	6	6

Quarterfinals
(Kazakhstan) G Voskoboeva	3	7^{7}	3
4	(Romania) A Cadanțu	6	6^{3}	6
7	(Ukraine) E Svitolina	6	6
2	(Croatia) D Vekić	2	3

Semifinals
4	(Romania) A Cadanțu	1	4
7	(Ukraine) E Svitolina	6	6

== Qualifying ==
=== Seeds ===
1. (Uzbekistan) Nigina Abduraimova (moved to main draw)
2. (Poland) Magda Linette (qualified)
3. (Ukraine) Kateryna Kozlova (qualified)
4. (Italy) Alberta Brianti (qualifying competition)
5. (Ukraine) Valentyna Ivakhnenko (first round)
6. (Ukraine) Veronika Kapshay (qualified)
7. (Ukraine) Tetyana Arefyeva (qualified)
8. (Uzbekistan) Sabina Sharipova (first round)
9. (Russia) Yuliya Kalabina (qualifying competition)
10. (Russia) Mayya Katsitadze (first round)
11. (Georgia (country)) Oksana Kalashnikova (qualified)
12. (Russia) Marina Melnikova (qualifying competition)
13. (Belgium) Ysaline Bonaventure (qualifying competition)

=== Qualifiers ===
1. (Czech Republic) Tereza Martincová
2. (Poland) Magda Linette
3. (Ukraine) Kateryna Kozlova
4. (Ukraine) Tetyana Arefyeva
5. (Georgia (country)) Oksana Kalashnikova
6. (Ukraine) Veronika Kapshay

=== Qualifying draw ===
==== First qualifier ====
First round
13	(Belgium) Ysaline Bonaventure	6	6
(Belarus) Polina Pekhova	4	2
(Czech Republic) Tereza Martincová	6	6
10	(Russia) Mayya Katsitadze	2	3

Qualifying competition
13	(Belgium) Ysaline Bonaventure	2	5
(Czech Republic) Tereza Martincová	6	7

==== Second qualifier ====
First round
2	(Poland) Magda Linette	7^{11}	6^{5}	6
(Spain) Inés Ferrer Suárez	6^{9}	7^{7}	3
(Ukraine) Irina Buryachok	6	6
8	(Uzbekistan) Sabina Sharipova	1	1

Qualifying competition
2	(Poland) Magda Linette	6	7
(Ukraine) Irina Buryachok	2	5

==== Third qualifier ====
First round
3	(Ukraine) Kateryna Kozlova	6	6
(Russia) Ekaterina Yashina	2	2
(Czech Republic) Kateřina Kramperová	6	3	3
12	(Russia) Marina Melnikova	4	6	6

Qualifying competition
3	(Ukraine) Kateryna Kozlova	6	6
12	(Russia) Marina Melnikova	3	4

==== Fourth qualifier ====
First round
4	(Italy) Alberta Brianti	6	7
Alt	(Sweden) Sandra Roma	1	5
(Ukraine) Anastasiya Vasylyeva	6	3	4
7	(Ukraine) Tetyana Arefyeva	4	6	6

Qualifying competition
4	(Italy) Alberta Brianti	6	4	1
7	(Ukraine) Tetyana Arefyeva	1	6	6

==== Fifth qualifier ====
First round
5	(Ukraine) Valentyna Ivakhnenko	6	2	1
WC	(Ukraine) Oleksandra Korashvili	3	6	6
WC	(Georgia (country)) Tamari Chalaganidze	0	0
11	(Georgia (country)) Oksana Kalashnikova	6	6

Qualifying competition
WC	(Ukraine) Oleksandra Korashvili	2	1
11	(Georgia (country)) Oksana Kalashnikova	6	6

==== Sixth qualifier ====
First round
6	(Ukraine) Veronika Kapshay	6	6
WC	(Serbia) Barbara Bonić	3	4
WC	(Russia) Ksenia Gaydarzhi	5	0
9	(Russia) Yuliya Kalabina	7	6

Qualifying competition
6	(Ukraine) Veronika Kapshay	6	6
9	(Russia) Yuliya Kalabina	1	3
