= 2014 Ningbo International Women's Tennis Open – Singles =

Women's tennis tournament

Singles
- 2014 Ningbo International Women's Tennis Open

Final
- Champion: (Poland) Magda Linette
- Runner-up: (China) Wang Qiang
- Score: 3–6, 7–5, 6–1

Events
Singles	Doubles
- Ningbo International Women's Tennis Open

Bojana Jovanovski was the defending champion, but he chose not to compete in the 2014 competition.

Magda Linette won the title over Wang Qiang with the score 3–6, 7–5, 6–1.

== Seeds ==
1. (Thailand) Luksika Kumkhum (first round)
2. (China) Zheng Saisai (quarterfinals)
3. (Russia) Alla Kudryavtseva (second round)
4. (Austria) Patricia Mayr-Achleitner (first round)
5. (Russia) Vitalia Diatchenko (first round)
6. (China) Wang Qiang (final)
7. (Israel) Shahar Pe'er (first round)
8. (Japan) Misaki Doi (first round, retired)

== Main draw ==
Key

- Q = Qualifier
- WC = Wild card
- LL = Lucky loser
- Alt = Alternate
- ITF = ITF entry
- PR = Protected ranking
- SR = Special ranking
- SE = Special exempt
- JE = Junior exempt
- JR = Junior Accelerator Programme entrant
- CO = College Accelerator Programme entrant
- NG = Next Gen Accelerator Program entrant
- w/o = Walkover
- r = Retired
- d = Defaulted

=== Finals ===
Semifinals
(China) Duan Yingying	1	3
6	(China) Wang Qiang	6	6
(Poland) Paula Kania	1	1
(Poland) Magda Linette	6	6

Final
6	(China) Wang Qiang	6	5	1
(Poland) Magda Linette	3	7	6

=== Top half ===
First round
1	(Thailand) L Kumkhum	2	2
(China) Y Duan	6	6
(Slovenia) T Majerič	1	3
(Russia) E Kulichkova	6	6
(Canada) S Fichman	6	4	6
(Ukraine) K Kozlova	4	6	3
(Russia) E Bychkova	3	6	1
8	(Japan) M Doi	6	3	0^{r}
3	(Russia) A Kudryavtseva	3	7	6
WC	(China) X Han	6	5	1
(China) L Zhu	7	6
Q	(Chinese Taipei) C-w Chan	5	3
Q	(China) C Liu	6	6
(Japan) M Eguchi	0	3
(Russia) K Pervak	2^{r}
6	(China) Q Wang	4

Second round
(China) Y Duan	5	6	7
(Russia) E Kulichkova	7	3	5
(Canada) S Fichman	6^{1}	6	5
(Russia) E Bychkova	7^{7}	4	7
3	(Russia) A Kudryavtseva	2	4
(China) L Zhu	6	6
Q	(China) C Liu	3	0
6	(China) Q Wang	6	6

Quarterfinals
(China) Y Duan	5	6	6
(Russia) E Bychkova	7	4	4
(China) L Zhu	3	1
6	(China) Q Wang	6	6

Semifinals
(China) Y Duan	1	3
6	(China) Q Wang	6	6

=== Bottom half ===
First round
5	(Russia) V Diatchenko	4	6	6^{3}
WC	(China) Z Yang	6	3	7^{7}
(Poland) P Kania	6	6
(Japan) E Hozumi	2	2
(Hungary) M Czink	6	3	1
(China) Yaf Wang	4	6	6
Q	(China) Yan Wang	6	6
4	(Austria) P Mayr-Achleitner	3	4
7	(Israel) S Pe'er	4	6	3
(Poland) M Linette	6	3	6
WC	(China) Y Xu	3	6	7
WC	(China) K Zhang	6	3	5
(Chinese Taipei) S-w Hsieh	4	6	6
(Hong Kong) L Zhang	6	1	1
Q	(Australia) Ar Rodionova	2	1
2	(China) S Zheng	6	6

Second round
WC	(China) Z Yang	4	3
(Poland) P Kania	6	6
(China) Yaf Wang	1	6	1
Q	(China) Yan Wang	6	3	6
(Poland) M Linette	6	6
WC	(China) Y Xu	1	4
(Chinese Taipei) S-w Hsieh	4	4
2	(China) S Zheng	6	6

Quarterfinals
(Poland) P Kania	7^{7}	4	7
Q	(China) Yan Wang	6^{2}	6	5
(Poland) M Linette	1	7	6
2	(China) S Zheng	6	5	3

Semifinals
(Poland) P Kania	1	1
(Poland) M Linette	6	6
