= 2014 Ningbo International Women's Tennis Open – Doubles =

Doubles
- 2014 Ningbo International Women's Tennis Open

Final
- Champions: (Australia) Arina Rodionova (Ukraine) Olga Savchuk
- Runners-up: (China) Han Xinyun (China) Zhang Kailin
- Score: 4–6, 7–6^{(7–2)}, [10–6]

Events
Singles	Doubles
- Ningbo International Women's Tennis Open

Chan Yung-jan and Zhang Shuai were the defending champions, but neither player chose to participate this year.

The top seeds Arina Rodionova and Olga Savchuk won the title, defeating Chinese pair Han Xinyun and Zhang Kailin in the final, 4–6, 7–6^{(7–2)}, [10–6].

== Seeds ==
1. (Australia) Arina Rodionova / (Ukraine) Olga Savchuk (champions)
2. (Japan) Misaki Doi / (China) Xu Yifan (first round; withdrew)
3. (Chinese Taipei) Chan Chin-wei / (Chinese Taipei) Chuang Chia-jung (semifinals)
4. (Canada) Sharon Fichman / (China) Zheng Saisai (semifinals)

== Draw ==
Key

- Q = Qualifier
- WC = Wild card
- LL = Lucky loser
- Alt = Alternate
- ITF = ITF entry
- PR = Protected ranking
- SR = Special ranking
- SE = Special exempt
- JE = Junior exempt
- JR = Junior Accelerator Programme entrant
- CO = College Accelerator Programme entrant
- NG = Next Gen Accelerator Program entrant
- w/o = Walkover
- r = Retired
- d = Defaulted

First round
1	(Australia) Ar Rodionova (Ukraine) O Savchuk	6	3	[10]
(Japan) E Hozumi (Czech Republic) K Vaňková	4	6	[6]
(Russia) E Bychkova (Russia) V Diatchenko	4	4
(Poland) M Linette (Hong Kong) L Zhang	6	6
4	(Canada) S Fichman (China) S Zheng	7	6
(China) C Liang (China) C Liu	5	2
WC	(China) Q Ye (China) Y Zhang	3	4
(Chinese Taipei) Y-h Lee (Slovenia) T Majerič	6	6
(Thailand) L Kumkhum (Thailand) T Tanasugarn	6	4	[5]
(Poland) P Kania (Ukraine) K Kozlova	4	6	[10]
(Chinese Taipei) K-c Chang (Chinese Taipei) S-y Hsieh	2	2
3	(Chinese Taipei) C-w Chan (Chinese Taipei) C-j Chuang	6	6
(China) Y Wang (China) L Zhu	6	1	[8]
(China) X Han (China) K Zhang	2	6	[10]
(Austria) P Mayr-Achleitner (Israel) S Pe'er	w/o
2	(Japan) M Doi (China) Y Xu

Quarterfinals
1	(Australia) Ar Rodionova (Ukraine) O Savchuk	1	7	[10]
(Poland) M Linette (Hong Kong) L Zhang	6	5	[7]
4	(Canada) S Fichman (China) S Zheng	6	6
(Chinese Taipei) Y-h Lee (Slovenia) T Majerič	3	1
(Poland) P Kania (Ukraine) K Kozlova	1	3
3	(Chinese Taipei) C-w Chan (Chinese Taipei) C-j Chuang	6	6
(China) X Han (China) K Zhang	7	4	[10]
(Austria) P Mayr-Achleitner (Israel) S Pe'er	5	6	[5]

Semifinals
1	(Australia) Ar Rodionova (Ukraine) O Savchuk	6	6
4	(Canada) S Fichman (China) S Zheng	2	2
3	(Chinese Taipei) C-w Chan (Chinese Taipei) C-j Chuang	3	1
(China) X Han (China) K Zhang	6	6

Final
1	(Australia) Ar Rodionova (Ukraine) O Savchuk	4	7^{7}	[10]
(China) X Han (China) K Zhang	6	6^{2}	[6]
