= 2014 Ningbo International Women's Tennis Open =

- Date: 27 October – 2 November
- Edition: 5th
- Category: WTA 125K series
- Draw: 32S/16D
- Prize money: $125,000
- Surface: Hard
- Location: Ningbo, China

Champions

Singles
- (Poland) Magda Linette

Doubles
- (Australia) Arina Rodionova / (Ukraine) Olga Savchuk
- Ningbo International Women's Tennis Open

The 2014 Ningbo Women's Tennis Open was a professional women's tennis tournament played on hard courts. It is the fifth edition of the tournament which is part of the 2014 WTA 125K series. It was held place in Ningbo, China, from 27 October until 2 November 2014.

== Singles entrants ==
=== Seeds ===
| Country | Player | Rank^{1} | Seed |
|---|---|---|---|
| THA | Luksika Kumkhum | 85 | 1 |
| CHN | Zheng Saisai | 93 | 2 |
| RUS | Alla Kudryavtseva | 97 | 3 |
| AUT | Patricia Mayr-Achleitner | 103 | 4 |
| RUS | Vitalia Diatchenko | 105 | 5 |
| CHN | Wang Qiang | 110 | 6 |
| ISR | Shahar Pe'er | 119 | 7 |
| JPN | Misaki Doi | 120 | 8 |

- ^{1} Rankings as of 20 October 2014

=== Other entrants ===
The following players received wildcards into the singles main draw:

- (China) Han Xinyun
- (China) Xu Yifan
- (China) Yang Zhaoxuan
- (China) Zhang Kailin

The following players received entry from the qualifying draw:

- (Chinese Taipei) Chan Chin-wei
- (China) Liu Chang
- (Australia) Arina Rodionova
- (China) Wang Yan

=== Withdrawals ===
Before the tournament

- (Germany) Anna-Lena Friedsam [replaced by Tadeja Majerič]
- (Romania) Sorana Cîrstea [replaced by Eri Hozumi]
- (Belarus) Olga Govortsova [replaced by Ekaterina Bychkova]
- (Japan) Kimiko Date-Krumm [replaced by Elizaveta Kulichkova]

== Doubles entrants ==
=== Seeds ===
| Country | Player | Country | Player | Rank | Seed |
|---|---|---|---|---|---|
| AUS | Arina Rodionova | UKR | Olga Savchuk | 134 | 1 |
| JPN | Misaki Doi | CHN | Xu Yifan | 144 | 2 |
| TPE | Chan Chin-wei | TPE | Chuang Chia-jung | 164 | 3 |
| CAN | Sharon Fichman | CHN | Zheng Saisai | 167 | 4 |

=== Other entrants ===
The following players received wildcards into the doubles draw:

- (China) Ye Qiuyu / (China) Zhang Ying

== Champions ==
=== Singles ===
- (Poland) Magda Linette def. (China) Wang Qiang, 3–6, 7–5, 6–1

=== Doubles ===
- (Australia) Arina Rodionova / (Ukraine) Olga Savchuk def. (China) Han Xinyun / (China) Zhang Kailin, 4–6, 7–6^{(7–2)}, [10–6]
