= 2013 Baku Cup =

Tennis tournament

- Date: 22–28 July
- Edition: 3rd
- Category: WTA International
- Draw: 32S / 16D
- Surface: Hard / outdoor
- Location: Baku, Azerbaijan

Champions

Singles
- (Ukraine) Elina Svitolina

Doubles
- (Ukraine) Irina Buryachok / (Georgia (country)) Oksana Kalashnikova
- Baku Cup

The 2013 Baku Cup was a professional tennis tournament played on hard courts. This was the third edition of the tournament, which was part of the 2013 WTA Tour. It took place in Baku, Azerbaijan between 22 July and 28 July 2013. Seventh-seeded Elina Svitolina won the singles title.

== Finals ==
=== Singles ===
- (Ukraine) Elina Svitolina defeated (Israel) Shahar Pe'er, 6–4, 6–4

=== Doubles ===
- (Ukraine) Irina Buryachok / (Georgia (country)) Oksana Kalashnikova defeated (Greece) Eleni Daniilidou / (Serbia) Aleksandra Krunić, 4–6, 7–6^{(7–3)}, [10–4]

== Singles main-draw entrants ==
=== Seeds ===
Country	Player	Rank^{1}	Seed
SRB	Bojana Jovanovski	38	1
CRO	Donna Vekić	62	2
RSA	Chanelle Scheepers	68	3
ROU	Alexandra Cadanțu	70	4
CZE	Karolína Plíšková	73	5
SLO	Polona Hercog	82	6
UKR	Elina Svitolina	84	7
SRB	Vesna Dolonc	85	8

- ^{1} Rankings are as of July 15, 2013.

=== Other entrants ===
The following players received wildcards into the singles main draw:

- (Azerbaijan) Kamilla Farhad
- (Tunisia) Ons Jabeur
- (Azerbaijan) Nazrin Jafarova

The following players received entry from the qualifying draw:

- (Ukraine) Tetyana Arefyeva
- (Georgia (country)) Oksana Kalashnikova
- (Ukraine) Veronika Kapshay
- (Ukraine) Kateryna Kozlova
- (Poland) Magda Linette
- (Czech Republic) Tereza Martincová

The following players entered by using a Protected Ranking:

- (Netherlands) Michaëlla Krajicek

=== Withdrawals ===
Before the tournament

- (Hungary) Tímea Babos
- (Germany) Annika Beck
- (Spain) Estrella Cabeza Candela
- (France) Caroline Garcia
- (Italy) Karin Knapp
- (Switzerland) Romina Oprandi
- (France) Pauline Parmentier
- (Germany) Andrea Petkovic

=== Retirements ===
- (Tunisia) Ons Jabeur (ankle injury)

== Doubles main-draw entrants ==
=== Seeds ===
Country	Player	Country	Player	Rank^{1}	Seed
LUX	Mandy Minella	RSA	Chanelle Scheepers	124	1
UKR	Irina Buryachok	GEO	Oksana Kalashnikova	145	2
AUT	Sandra Klemenschits	SLO	Andreja Klepač	181	3
CZE	Karolína Plíšková	CZE	Kristýna Plíšková	200	4

- ^{1} Rankings are as of July 15, 2013.

=== Other entrants ===
The following pairs received wildcards into the doubles main draw:

- (Georgia (country)) Tamari Chalaganidze / (Azerbaijan) Nazrin Jafarova
- (Azerbaijan) Kamilla Farhad / (Uzbekistan) Sabina Sharipova
