= Ksenia Gaydarzhi =

Russian tennis player

- Full name: Ksenia Sergeyevna Gaydarzhi
- Native name: Ксения Сергеевна Гайдаржи
- Country (sports): Russia
- Born: 8 February 1995 (age 30); Moscow, Russia
- Prize money: $17,156

Singles
- Career record: 60–57
- Career titles: 2 ITF
- Highest ranking: 483 (21 September 2015)
- Current ranking: 605 (27 June 2016)

Doubles
- Career record: 20–27
- Career titles: 0
- Highest ranking: 796 (16 November 2015)
- Current ranking: 1067 (27 June 2016)
- Last updated on: 27 June 2016.

Ksenia Sergeyevna Gaydarzhi (Russian: Ксения Сергеевна Гайдаржи; born 8 February 1995 in Moscow) is a Russian tennis player.

Gaydarzhi has won two singles titles on the ITF tour in her career. On 21 September 2015, she reached her best singles ranking of world number 483. On 16 November 2015, she peaked at world number 796 in the doubles rankings.

Gaydarzhi made her WTA tour main draw debut at the 2014 Baku Cup. Having been awarded a wild card, she played Serbian qualifier Vesna Dolonc in the first round, losing in straight sets.

== ITF finals (2–3) ==
=== Singles (2–1) ===
Legend $100,000 tournaments $75,000 tournaments $50,000 tournaments $25,000 tournaments $15,000 tournaments $10,000 tournaments	Finals by surface Hard (2–1) Clay (0–0) Grass (0–0) Carpet (0–0)

Outcome	No.	Date	Tournament	Surface	Opponent	Score
Runner-up	1.	4 May 2015	Mytilene, Greece	Hard	(Bulgaria) Julia Stamatova	6–7^{(4–7)}, 6–1, 6–7^{(4–7)}
Winner	1.	13 July 2015	Sharm el-Sheikh, Egypt	Hard	(United States) Julia Jones	7–5, 3–6, 6–2
Winner	2.	7 September 2015	Antalya, Turkey	Hard	(Sweden) Fanny Östlund	7–6^{(7–3)}, 6–1

=== Doubles (0–2) ===
Legend $100,000 tournaments $75,000 tournaments $50,000 tournaments $25,000 tournaments $15,000 tournaments $10,000 tournaments	Finals by surface Hard (0–2) Clay (0–0) Grass (0–0) Carpet (0–0)

Outcome	No.	Date	Tournament	Surface	Partner	Opponents	Score
Runner-up	1.	6 April 2015	Antalya, Turkey	Hard	(Australia) Sara Tomic	(Ukraine) Alona Fomina (Slovakia) Chantal Škamlová	2–6, 1–6
Runner-up	2.	26 October 2015	Stockholm, Sweden	Hard (i)	(Sweden) Anette Munozova	(Sweden) Cornelia Lister (Sweden) Hilda Melander	4–6, 3–6
