= Magda Linette =

Polish tennis player (born 1992)

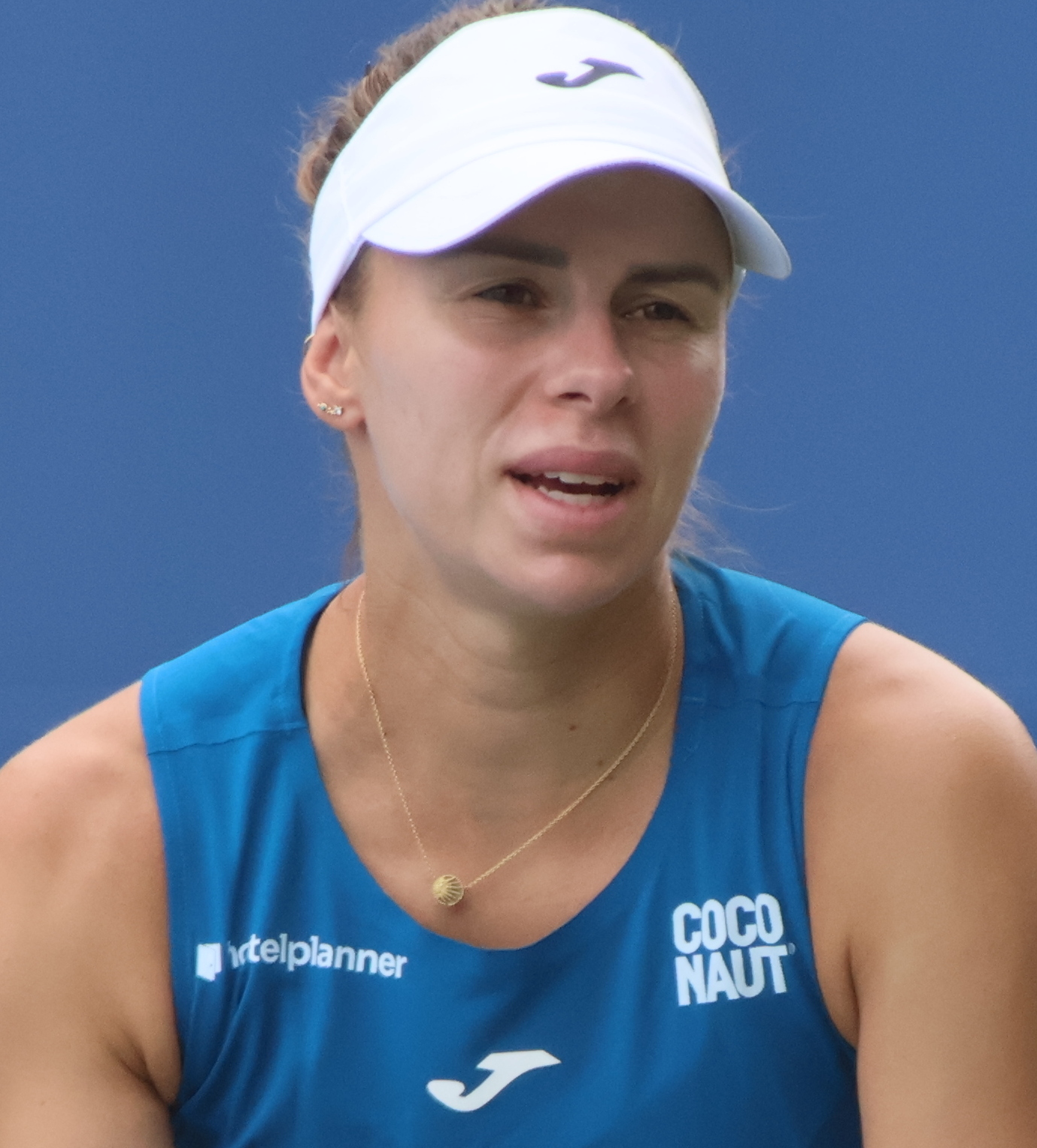
- Linette at the 2025 DC Open
- Country (sports): Poland
- Born: 12 February 1992 (age 34) Poznań, Poland
- Height: 1.71 m (5 ft 7 in)
- Turned pro: 2009
- Plays: Right-handed (two-handed backhand)
- Coach: Mark Gellard, Agnieszka Radwanska
- Prize money: $9,272,557
- Official website: magdalinette.com

Singles
- Career record: 528–421
- Career titles: 4
- Highest ranking: No. 19 (20 March 2023)
- Current ranking: No. 43 (9 November 2026)

Grand Slam singles results
- Australian Open: SF (2023)
- French Open: 3R (2017, 2021, 2026)
- Wimbledon: 3R (2019, 2021, 2023)
- US Open: 3R (2020)

Other tournaments
- Olympic Games: 2R (2024)

Doubles
- Career record: 195–191
- Career titles: 2
- Highest ranking: No. 26 (11 April 2022)
- Current ranking: No. 178 (9 November 2026)

Grand Slam doubles results
- Australian Open: 3R (2022)
- French Open: SF (2021)
- Wimbledon: 2R (2023, 2024, 2025)
- US Open: QF (2023)

Other doubles tournaments
- Olympic Games: 1R (2024)

Team competitions
- BJK Cup: 18–17
- Last updated on: 12 November 2026.

Magda Linette (born 12 February 1992) is a Polish professional tennis player. She has a career-high singles ranking of world No. 19, achieved in March 2023. She has reached nine finals on the WTA Tour, winning four of them, and also reached the semifinals of the 2023 Australian Open, and the third round at the other three majors.

Linette made her first appearance in a WTA Tour main draw at the Internationaux de Strasbourg in May 2013, where she also scored her first match win at this level. The same year, she reached her first WTA Tour semifinal in Baku, coming from qualifying. Linette won her first WTA 125 title at the 2014 Ningbo International Open, and her first WTA Tour title at the 2019 Bronx Open. Her best result in WTA Premier tournaments is the quarterfinals of 2016 Pan Pacific Open.

In 2020, she earned the Fan Favorite Shot of the Year award by the WTA for a slice forehand that she played against Peng Shuai en route to her second career title at the Thailand Open.

== Personal life ==
Magda Linette was born on 12 February 1992 in Poznań to Tomasz Linette and Beata Linette. Her father is a tennis coach and her mother is an educator. Linette was coached by Izudin Zunić during the first half of her career, but beginning in 2018, formed a partnership with Great Britain's Mark Gellard.

== Career ==
=== Juniors ===
As a youth she represented local club Grunwald Poznań with successes at junior level.

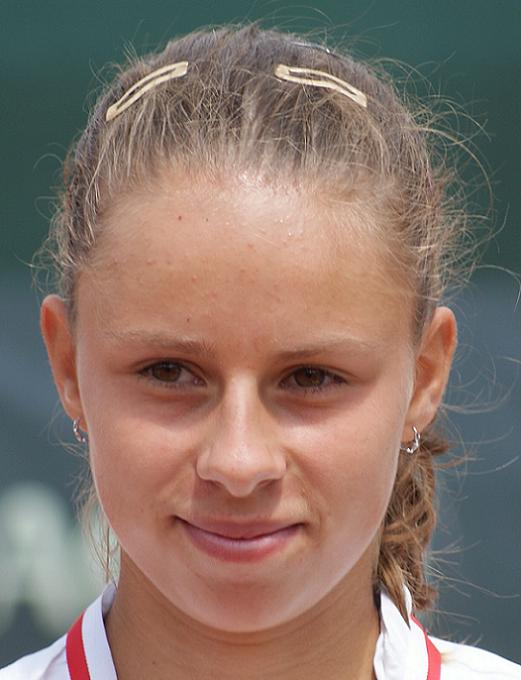
Magda Linette in 2009

=== 2010 ===
In May, Linette received a wildcard to the qualifying draw of the Warsaw Open, a Premier-level tournament. She beat her doubles partner Paula Kania in straight sets but lost to Anna Chakvetadze. In June, she won her first professional tournament in Szczecin as a wildcard entrant. In July, she made it to the final of the ITF Circuit tournament at Toruń but lost to top seed Ksenia Pervak, in straight sets.

Linette won another two ITF Circuit titles in August, in Hechingen and Versmold, both in Germany. At the Ladies Open Hechingen, as a qualifier, she defeated Sílvia Soler Espinosa, and in the Reinert Open, she beat Irina-Camelia Begu in straight sets.

She continued to play $25k tournaments and won her fourth title of the season in Katowice by defeating Eva Birnerová in three sets. The week after, she reached another final in Zagreb but lost to Renata Voráčová, after 21 consecutive wins on the ITF Women's Circuit. She reached the final in Opole, losing to Sandra Záhlavová in three sets.

=== 2011 ===
In early February, Linette played for the first time as a member of Poland Fed Cup team. She defeated Anne Kremer in straight sets, but lost her three other matches. In May, she made her first appearance in a Grand Slam tournament, playing in the qualifying rounds.

=== 2012 ===
Starting the season with several early exits, Magda Linette advanced to her first singles final in over 18 months at the $10k event of Florence in May but lost to Anaïs Laurendon. She reached a $25k final in Kristinehamn a month later, defeated by Sacha Jones from Australia. In Ystad, she won her first doubles title with her friend Katarzyna Piter.

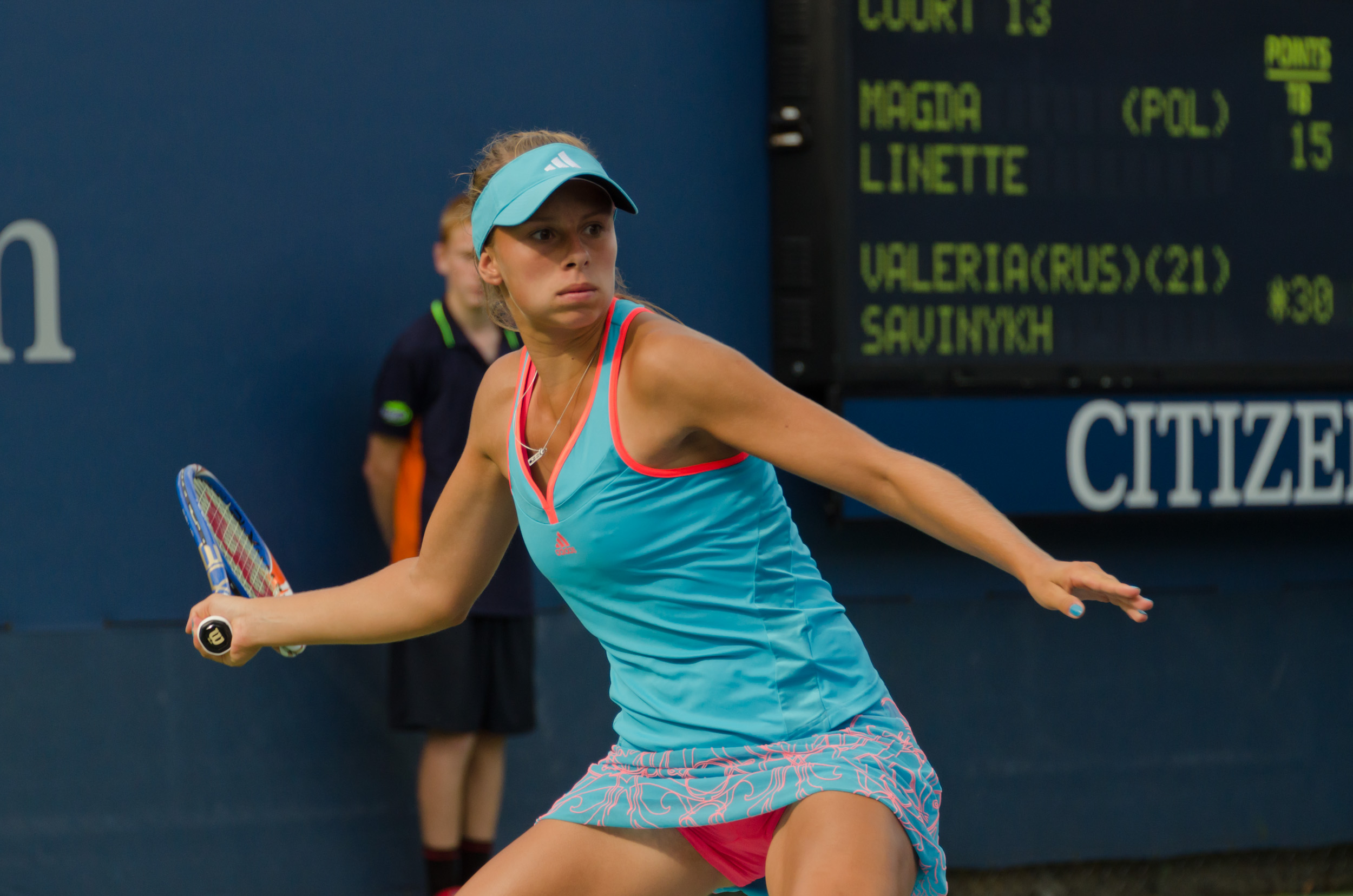
Linette at the 2011 US Open

She won a $10k tournament in Prague, beating Kateřina Siniaková and Zuzana Luknárová without dropping a set, lifting her fifth singles trophy and the first since September 2010.

In October and November, Linette got some of her best wins of the season by beating Eleni Daniilidou in Limoges, Monica Puig in Nantes, and Karolína Plíšková in Équeurdreville. She added two more doubles titles to her prize list, including her first $50k-level trophy in Limoges with compatriot Sandra Zaniewska. In December, she ended her season by winning another tournament in doubles with Katarzyna Piter in Ankara.

=== 2013 ===
Back in Europe in late March, Linette reached semifinals of the indoor hardcourt tournament in Tallinn, falling to Aliaksandra Sasnovich. At the end of the month, she lost the singles final at Civitavecchia to Anna Karolína Schmiedlová.

Getting through WTA tournament qualifying at the Baku Cup, Linette made her second appearance in a main draw at this level. She defeated Julia Cohen, runner-up of the previous edition, then Kristýna Plíšková to reach the quarterfinals where she benefited from a controversial retirement of Ons Jabeur. She lost her first semifinal match on WTA Tour to Shahar Pe'er.

Linette started to compete in successive indoor hardcourt events in France and got more success. She reached semifinals at the $50k Open de Touraine in Joué-lès-Tours. The week after, she won her eighth doubles title, partnering with Viktorija Golubic. She competed in her first $50k singles final in Nantes, falling to Aliaksandra Sasnovich. In December, she won a 25k tournament in Pune.

=== 2014 ===
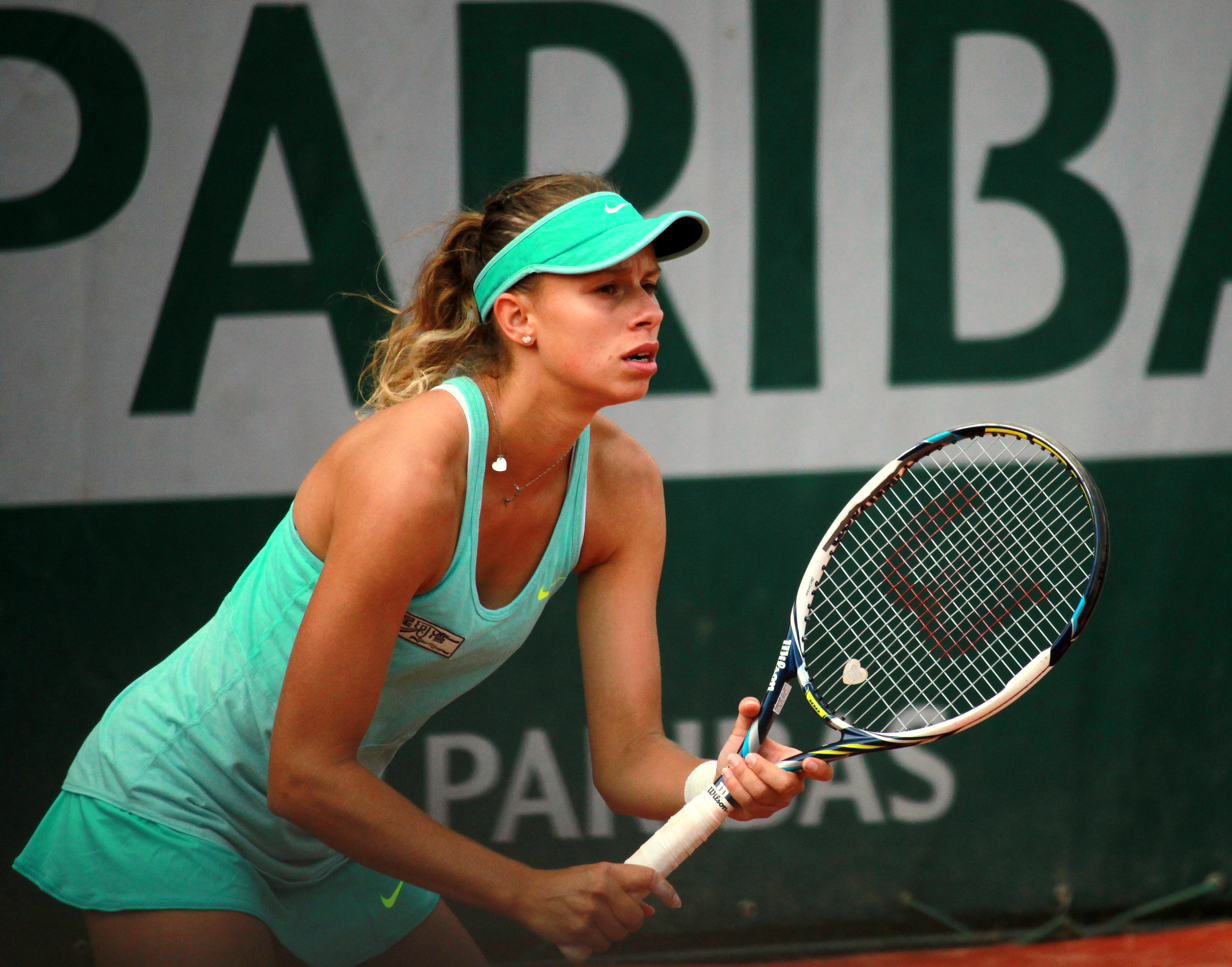
Linette during her first-round match at the 2015 French Open

Linette launched her grass-court season with two ITF tournaments in England but lost twice to Anett Kontaveit, in straight sets. She sustained an ankle injury from her first qualifying match at Wimbledon and had to stop playing for a month.

In September, she played a series of WTA Tour events. At the Guangzhou Open, she reached her first doubles final, partnering Alizé Cornet.

In late October, she won the Ningbo International Open, a WTA 125 event, defeating sixth seed Wang Qiang in the final; it was the biggest title of her career to date.

=== 2015: First top 100 season ===
Linette won a major match for the first time when she beat compatriot Urszula Radwańska at the US Open, but then lost to Agnieszka Radwańska. She reached the Japan Women's Open final, peaking at No. 64 in the rankings.

=== 2016–2018: Premier-Mandatory debut & third round, year-end top 100 ===
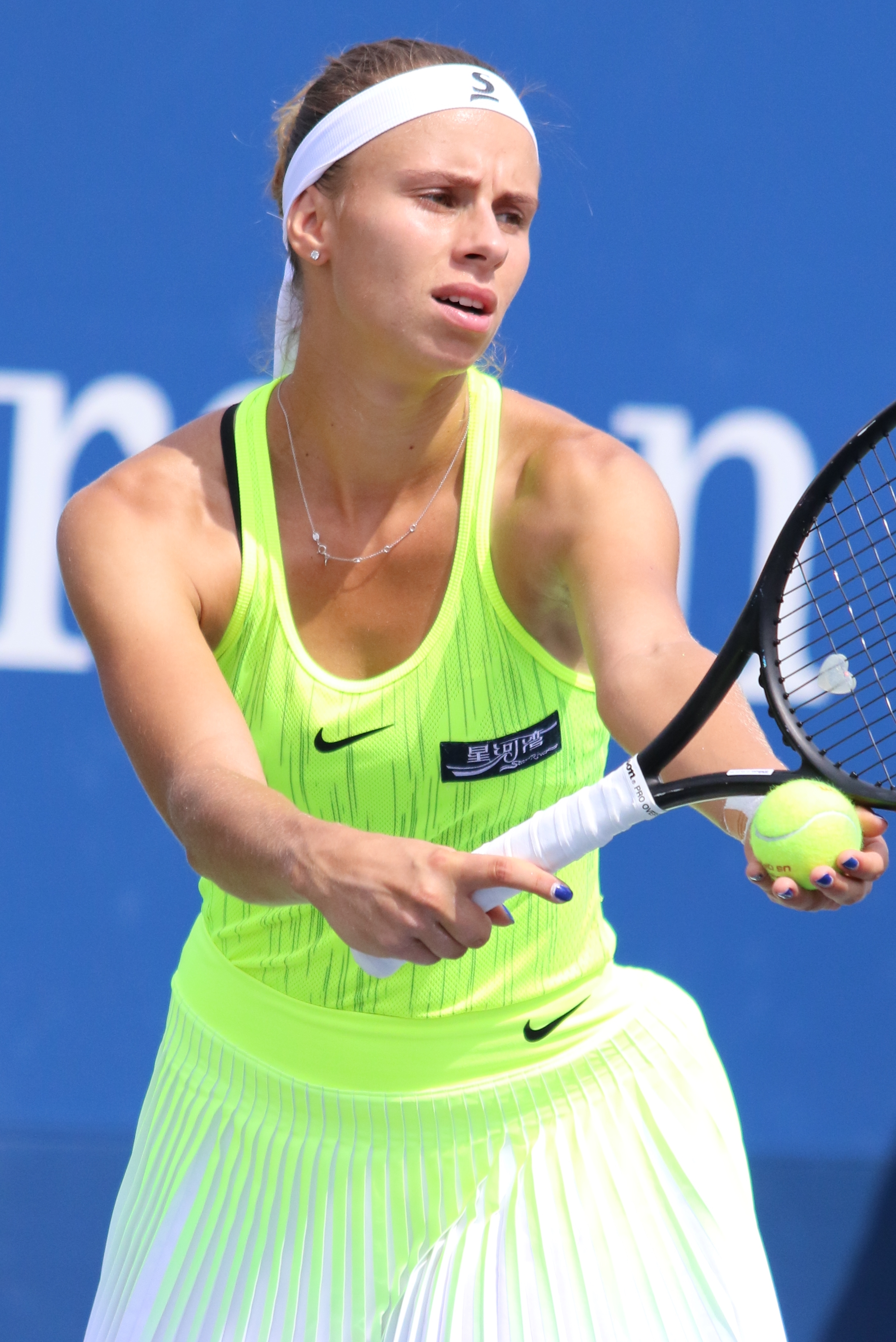
Linette at the 2016 US Open

Linette reached the third round of the 2016 Miami Open defeating Bethanie Mattek-Sands and 18th seed Jelena Janković by retirement. She lost to eventual champion Victoria Azarenka.

She reached the quarterfinals at the Katowice Open and the Pan Pacific Open. At the end of the 2016 season, she was ranked world No. 96.

Her 2017 season was highlighted by third tour-level semifinal of her career at Kuala Lumpur and the semifinals at the Malaysian Open. She appeared in her third career doubles final at Bogotá (with Cepede Royg), having been runner-up at the 2014 Guangzhou and 2016 Hong Kong events.

In 2018, Linette advanced to the quarterfinals at the Taiwan Open and the Copa Colsanitas in Bogotá.

=== 2019–2020: First WTA Tour titles and top 35 ===
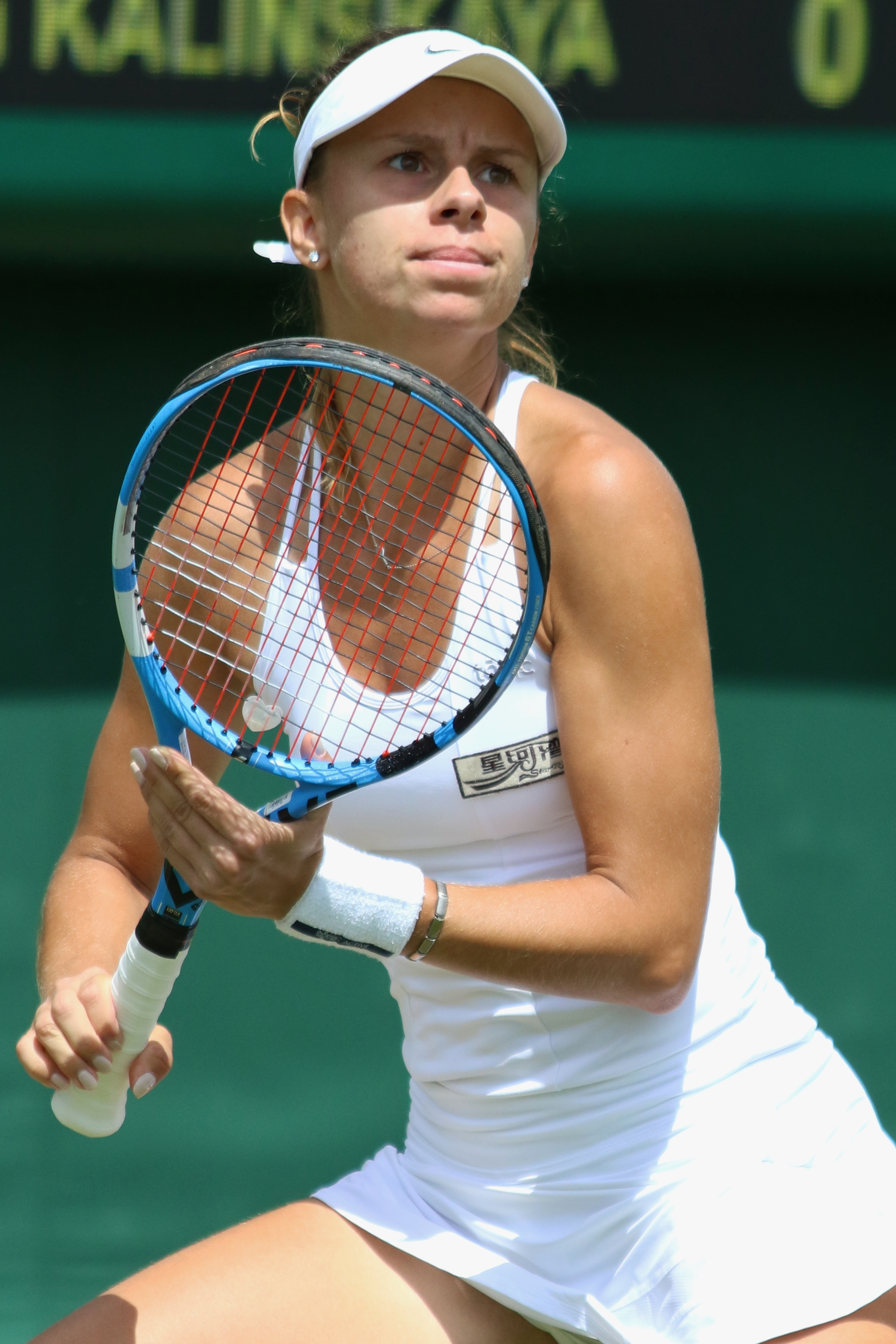
Linette in 2019

In August 2019, Linette won the first edition of the Bronx Open, her first WTA Tour title. The following week, Linette continued at Flushing Meadows where she lost to defending champion Naomi Osaka in the second round of the US Open. Linette cracked the top 50 for the first time in her career, after reaching the second round of the US Open.

Linette reached her third WTA Tour final at the 2019 Korea Open, losing there to Karolína Muchová.

In February 2020, Linette won the Thailand Open, rising to a career-high ranking of No. 33. In December, she was honoured by the WTA with the Fan Favorite Shot of the Year, which she performed in round two of the Thailand Open against Peng Shuai.

=== 2021: Major doubles semifinal & two third rounds in singles ===
Linette started the season at the end of March due to a knee injury. In May, she advanced to her first semifinal, since triumphing at the Hua Hin Championships in February 2020, in Strasbourg. She defeated Yulia Putintseva in the quarterfinal, before losing a three-set semifinal match against Sorana Cîrstea.

On May 21, Linette announced that she started a new coaching partnership with Dawid Celt, who was previously coaching Agnieszka Radwańska.

At the French Open, Linette defeated Chloé Paquet, and top seed Ashleigh Barty who retired with injury. In the third round, she lost to Ons Jabeur in three sets. At the same tournament in doubles, partnering with American Bernarda Pera, she reached a major semifinal for the first time in her career. Linette continued at Wimbledon, where she defeated Amanda Anisimova and third seed Elina Svitolina to advance to the third round, where she lost to Paula Badosa in three sets. She lost her opening match at the US Open to Coco Gauff.

=== 2022: Doubles grass-court title ===
In April, Linette won two three-set matches in one day to reach the Charleston Open quarterfinals, upsetting No. 7 seed Leylah Fernandez in the second round, before returning to defeat Kaia Kanepi in the third round, but lost to Ekaterina Alexandrova in the quarterfinals. At the same tournament, Linette won her first WTA Tour doubles title, and first title at the WTA-500 level, partnering Andreja Klepač.

At the French Open, she defeated Ons Jabeur in the first round, before losing to Martina Trevisan in the second. In June, partnering with Aleksandra Krunić, the pair was crowned Eastbourne International doubles champions, receiving a walkover in the semifinal and the final. It was Linette's first grass court title and second at the WTA 500 level. At the Chennai Open, she reached her fifth WTA Tour final, losing to Linda Fruhvirtová in three sets.

=== 2023: Major singles semifinal & doubles quarterfinals, top 20 ===
In her first tournament of the year, Linette represented Poland at the United Cup in Brisbane, and defeated Zhibek Kulambayeva, Jil Teichmann and Lucia Bronzetti on the way to the semifinals, before losing to Madison Keys in straight sets.

At the Australian Open, Linette defeated Mayar Sherif, 16th seed Anett Kontaveit, 19th seed Ekaterina Alexandrova and fourth seed Caroline Garcia reaching the quarterfinals for the first time at a Grand Slam. She went on to defeat 30th seed Karolína Plíšková to enter the semifinals, her best career result at a major level. She lost to the eventual champion Aryna Sabalenka, in straight sets. As a result, she reached No. 22 on 30 January 2023, and world No. 19 on 20 March 2023.

At the Miami Open, she reached the fourth round at a WTA 1000-level for the first time defeating this time Victoria Azarenka for her tenth career top-20 win.

At the US Open, she reached the quarterfinals in doubles for the first time at this major, partnering with Bernarda Pera. In September, Linette played in Guangzhou as the top seed and reached her sixth final but lost heavily to Wang Xiyu, winning only two games. In October, she qualified for the 2023 WTA Elite Trophy in Zhuhai.

=== 2024: WTA title, first WTA 1000 quarterfinal ===
In April, Linette defeated third seed Anhelina Kalinina in the semifinals at the Rouen Open, before losing the final in three sets to Sloane Stephens.

In July, she won the Prague Open defeating compatriot Magdalena Fręch in the first all-Polish WTA Tour final in the Open era. En route, she recorded wins over fifth seed Viktoriya Tomova in the quarterfinals and top seed Linda Nosková in the last four.

In September, at the WTA 1000 China Open, Linette reached the fourth round at that level only for the second time, with an upset over world No. 5, Jasmine Paolini, for her first top five season win. At the next WTA 1000 Wuhan Open, Linette upset two Russian seeds en route, 11th seed Liudmila Samsonova and eighth seed Daria Kasatkina in the round of 16 to reach her first WTA 1000-level quarterfinal which she lost to fourth seed Coco Gauff.

During the BJK Cup finals in November, Linette defeated Sara Sorribes Tormo in a match lasting almost four hours to help Poland overcome Spain to reach the quarterfinals.

=== 2025: Abu Dhabi and Miami quarters ===
In February, Linette reached the quarterfinals at the Abu Dhabi Open with wins over qualifier Renata Zarazúa and sixth seed Anastasia Pavlyuchenkova, before losing to Linda Nosková.

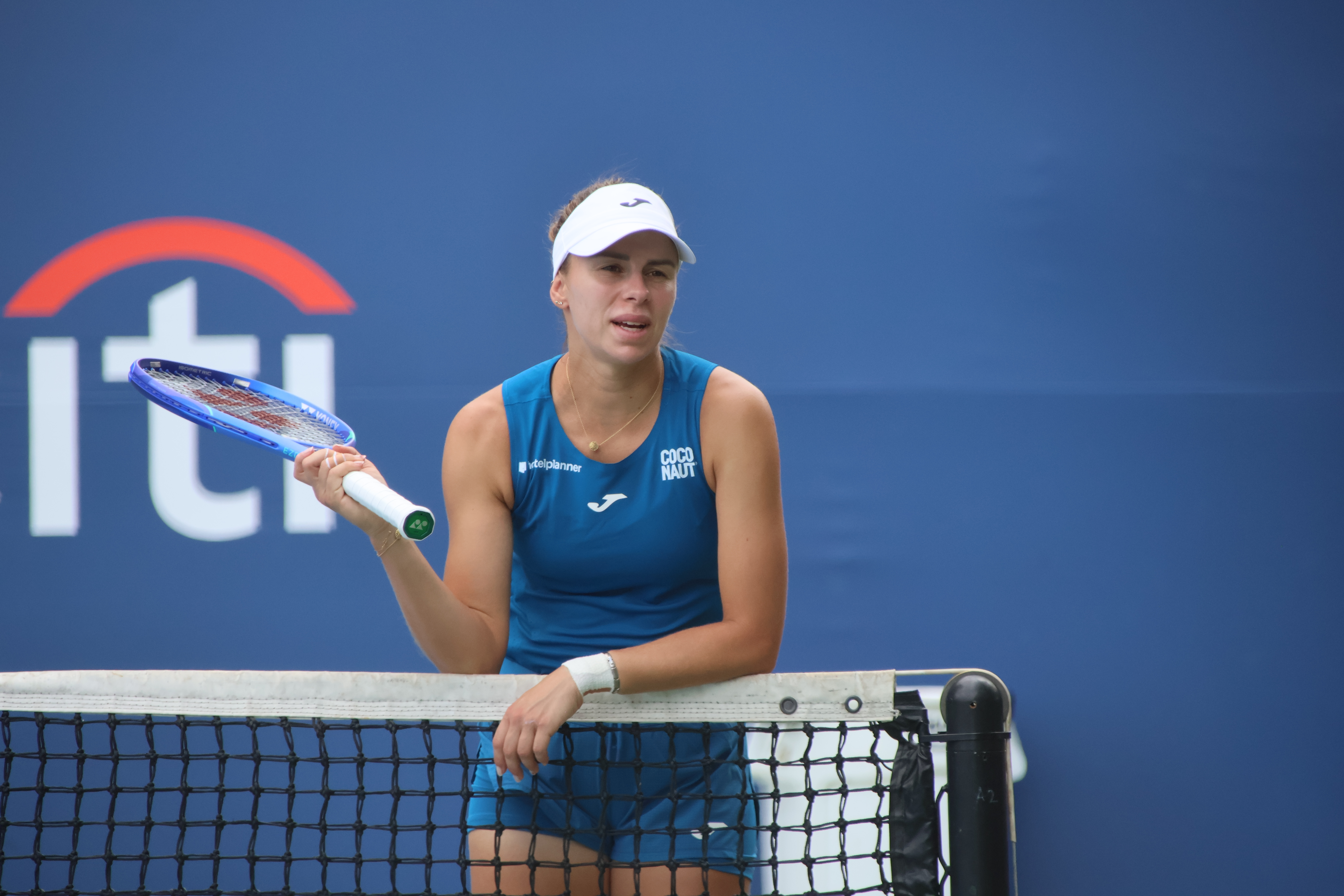
Linette at the 2025 DC Open.

She made it through to the quarterfinals at the Miami Open with a run which included defeating 18th seed Ekaterina Alexandrova and third seed Coco Gauff. She lost to sixth seed Jasmine Paolini in the last eight.

Linette also reached quarterfinals at the Strasbourg Open, where she lost to fourth seed and eventual champion, Elena Rybakina, and the Nottingham Open, where it was Dayana Yastremska who eliminated her.

=== 2026: Top-5 win, fourth career title, back to top 50 ===
Linette started her 2026 season making back-to-back quarterfinals, first at the Auckland Open, where she lost to fourth seed Alexandra Eala, and the following week at the Hobart International, where she was eliminated by third seed Iva Jovic.

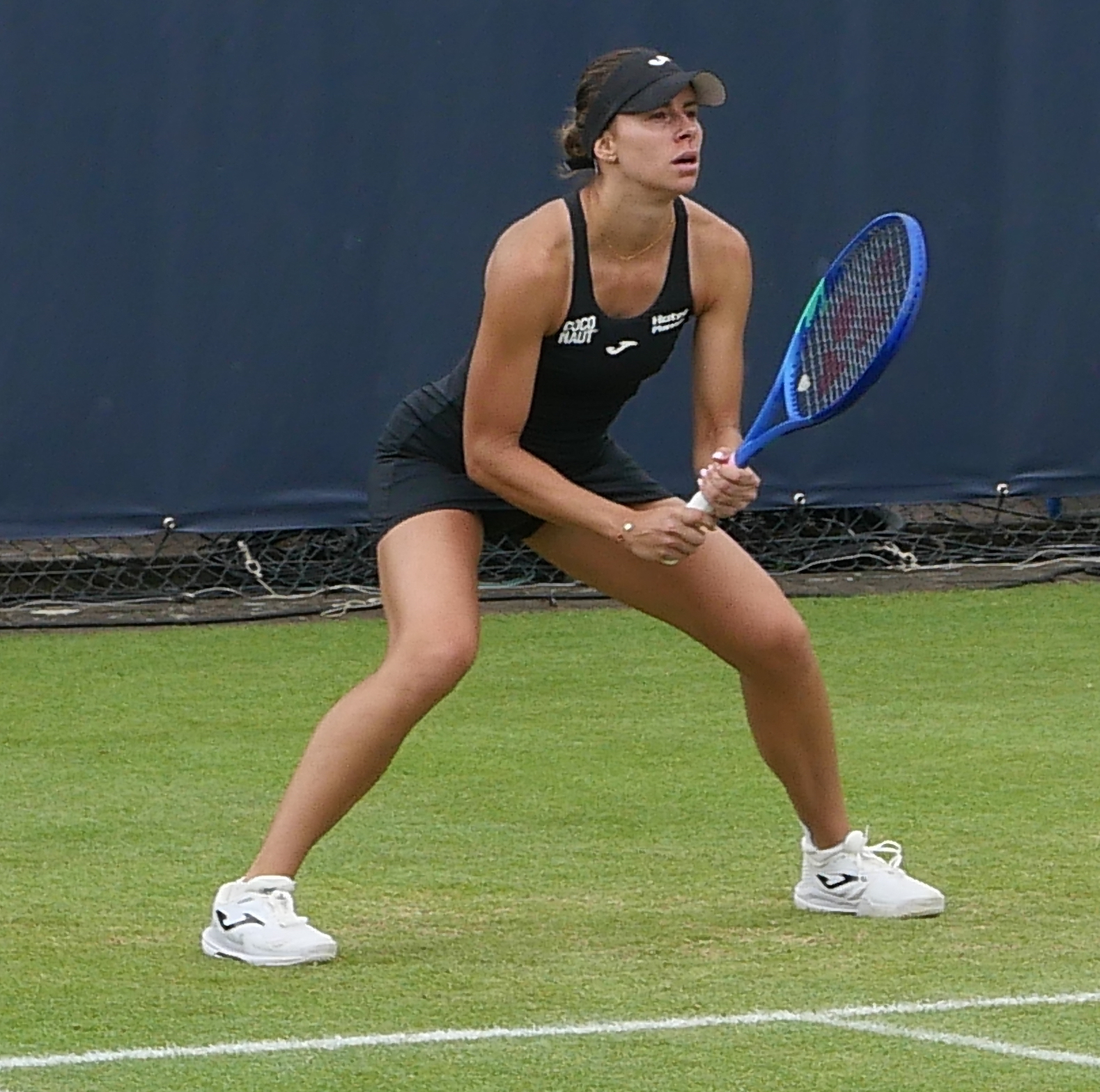
Linette at the 2026 Rosmalen Open

In March at the Miami Open, she defeated world No. 2, Iga Świątek, in the second round, only to lose her next match to 31st-seeded Alexandra Eala.

Having lost to Świątek in the third round at the French Open, Linette reached the semifinals at the grass-court Rosmalen Open, before losing to eighth seed Barbora Krejčíková.

In November at the Chennai Open, she won her fourth WTA Tour singles title, defeating top seed and defending champion, Janice Tjen, in the final. As a result, she returned to the top 50 at world No. 43 in the singles rankings, on 9 November 2026.

== Playing style ==
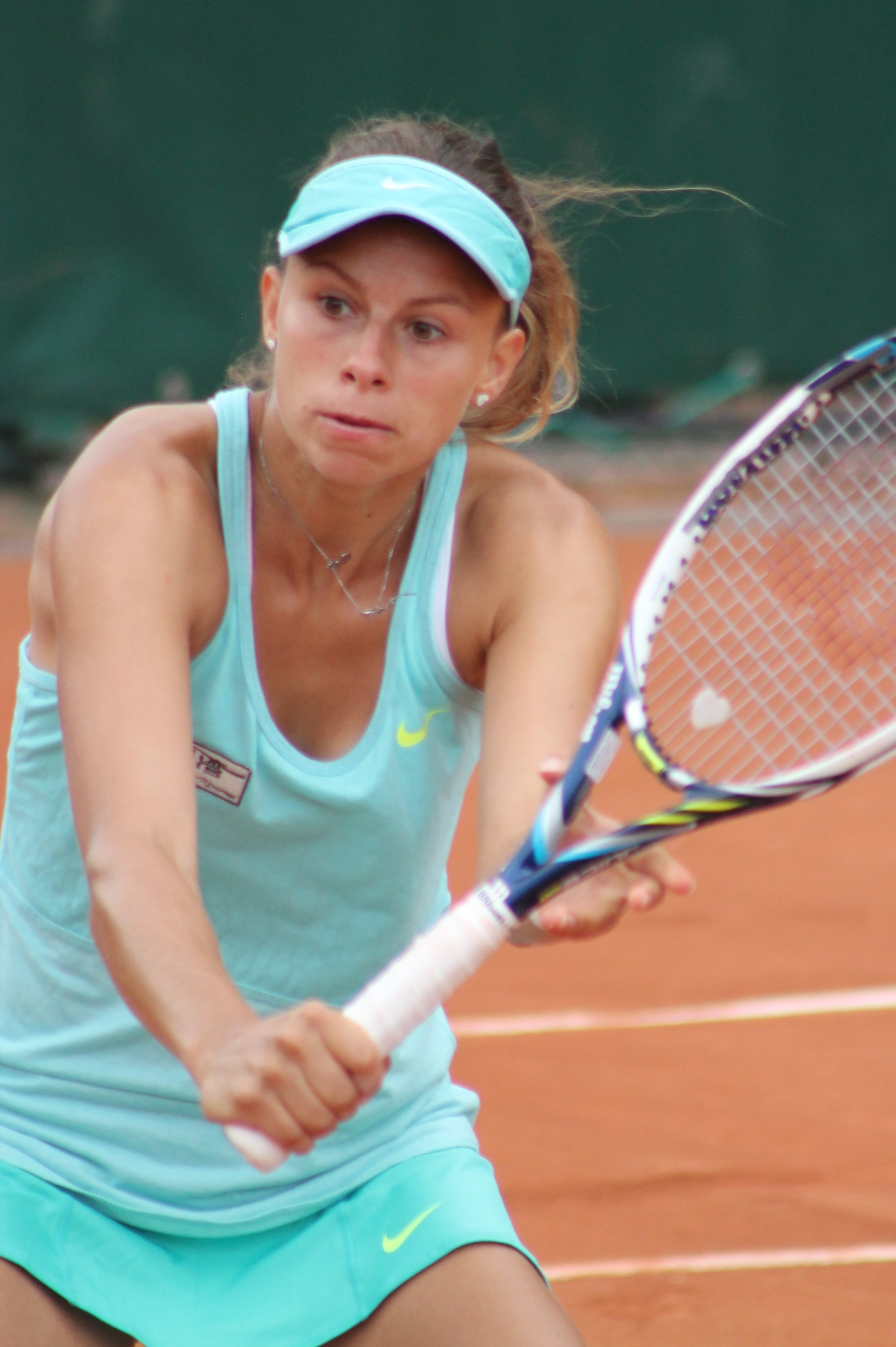
Linette playing a slice backhand, a shot that she uses frequently to break her opponent's rhythm.

Linette started out as a defensive player, whose game was primarily built around her strong movement and consistent ball striking from the baseline. The Pole has, however, began finding an increasing amount of success after altering her game style away from being a counterpuncher, to actively creating opportunities to hit winners on the court. Ever since partnering with Mark Gellard, Linette also worked on improving the mental aspect of her game.

"My whole life, I've needed a bit more time for everything![...] You have a different starting point but you're measured by the same measures as everybody else."

— Linette on the lack of institutional support in Poland and having her most successful season at the age of 28.

Her playing style includes speed, footwork, court coverage, and anticipation. Her two-handed backhand is hit flat with depth and results in winners. Her forehand is hit with topspin.

Having spent time on the doubles circuit as well, Linette has cultivated volleying skills and often looks to finish points off at the net. She is capable of introducing drop shots and sliced backhands into points, focusing on breaking up an opponent's rhythm, and to attempt to draw unforced errors out of aggressive players.

Linette's serve is not particularly strong, with her first serve averaging 95 mph (153 km/h) and her second serve averaging 80 mph (130 km/h), but is reliable, meaning that, whilst she does not ace frequently, double faults are also uncommon. She is a strong player on return, also, effectively neutralising strong first serves with a backhand down-the-line or a cross-court forehand.

== Career statistics ==
=== Grand Slam performance timelines ===
Key
W	F	SF	QF	#R	RR	Q#	DNQ	A	NH

(W) winner; (F) finalist; (SF) semifinalist; (QF) quarterfinalist; (#R) rounds 4, 3, 2, 1; (RR) round-robin stage; (Q#) qualification round; (DNQ) did not qualify; (A) absent; (NH) not held; (SR) strike rate (events won / competed); (W–L) win–loss record.
To avoid confusion and double counting, these charts are updated at the conclusion of a tournament or when the player's participation has ended.

==== Singles ====
Tournament	2011	2012	2013	2014	2015	2016	2017	2018	2019	2020	2021	2022	2023	2024	2025	2026	SR	W–L	Win %
Australian Open	A	A	A	Q2	Q1	1R	1R	3R	1R	1R	A	2R	SF	1R	1R	3R	0 / 10	10–10	50%
French Open	Q2	A	A	Q1	1R	1R	3R	1R	2R	1R	3R	2R	1R	1R	1R	3R	0 / 12	8–12	40%
Wimbledon	Q1	A	Q1	Q1	1R	1R	1R	1R	3R	NH	3R	2R	3R	1R	1R	1R	0 / 11	7–11	39%
US Open	Q1	A	Q1	Q1	2R	1R	1R	1R	2R	3R	1R	1R	2R	1R	1R	1R	0 / 12	5–12	29%
Win–Loss	0–0	0–0	0–0	0–0	1–3	0–4	2–4	2–4	4–4	2–3	4–3	3–4	8–4	0–4	0–4	4–4	0 / 45	30–45	40%

==== Doubles ====
Tournament	2015	2016	2017	2018	2019	2020	2021	2022	2023	2024	SR	W–L	Win %
Australian Open	A	1R	2R	2R	1R	1R	A	3R	1R	A	0 / 7	4–7	36%
French Open	2R	2R	2R	1R	A	2R	SF	1R	A	2R	0 / 8	9–8	53%
Wimbledon	1R	A	1R	A	1R	NH	1R	1R	2R	2R	0 / 7	2–7	22%
US Open	1R	1R	A	3R	2R	A	2R	1R	QF	2R	0 / 8	8–8	50%
Win–Loss	1–3	1–3	2–3	3–3	1–3	1–2	5–3	2–4	4–3	3–3	0 / 30	23–30	43%

== Notes ==
Sporting positions
Preceded by (Poland) Iga Świątek	Fan Favorite Shot of the Year; 2020	Succeeded by (Romania) Simona Halep
