= Nazrin Jafarova =

Azerbaijani tennis player

Nazrin Jafarova Nəzrin Cəfərova
- Full name: Nazrin Jafarova
- Country (sports): Azerbaijan
- Born: 16 November 1997 (age 28) Azerbaijan
- Plays: Right-handed (two-handed backhand)
- Prize money: $5,030

Singles
- Career record: 0-2
- Career titles: 0

Doubles
- Career record: 0-2
- Career titles: 0
- Last updated on: 17 August 2014.

Nazrin Jafarova (Azerbaijani: Nəzrin Cəfərova; born 16 November 1997) is an Azerbaijani tennis player.

Jafarova made her WTA tour debut at the 2013 Baku Cup, having received a wildcard into the main draw, but lost in the first round to world number 62 Donna Vekić of Croatia. She was also granted a wildcard into the doubles tournament with Tamari Chalaganidze, but the pair lost to Ilona Kremen and Marina Melnikova in the first round.
