= Olga Savchuk =

Ukrainian tennis player

Olga Savchuk Ольга Савчук
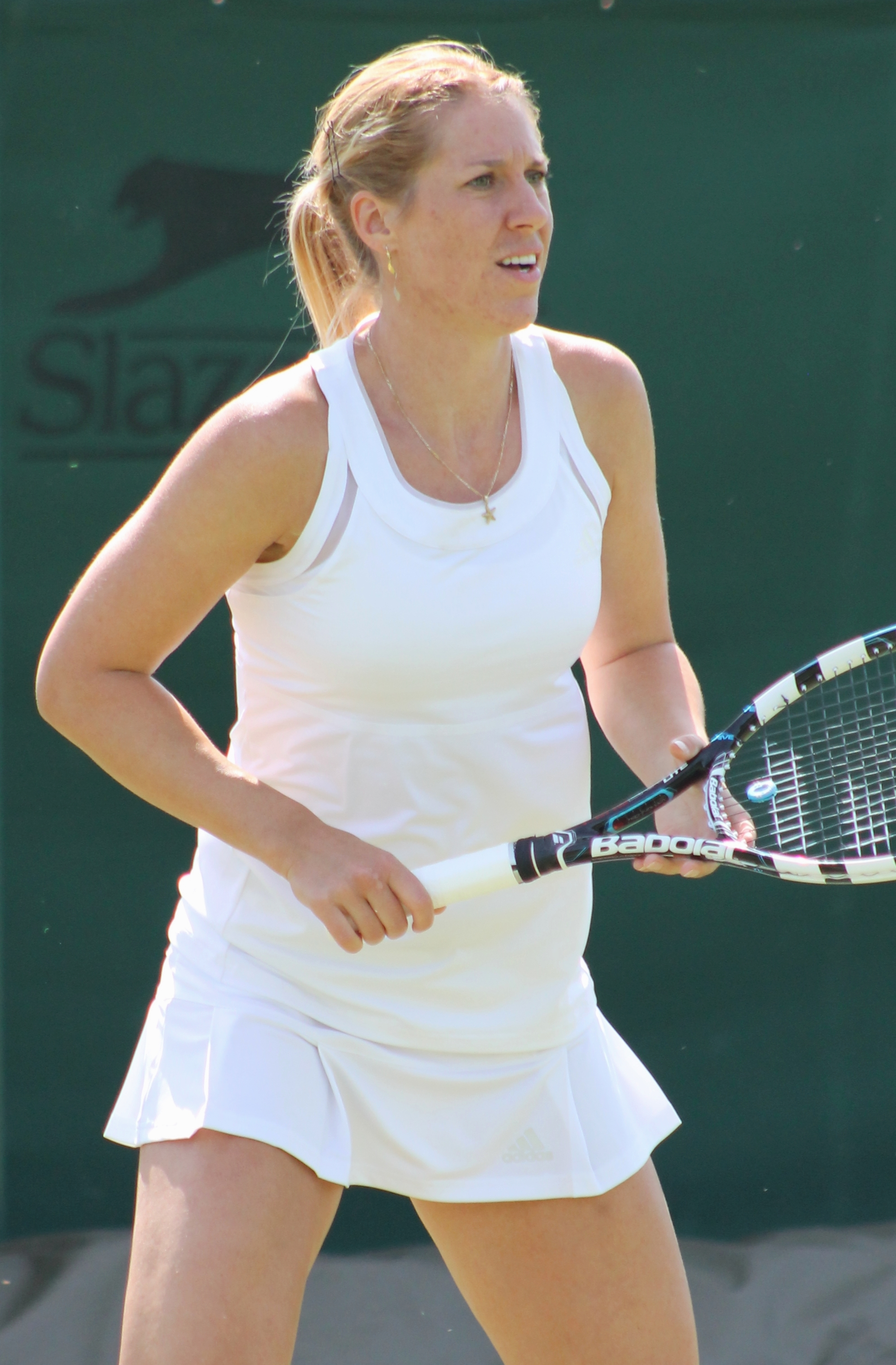
- Olga Savchuk in 2014
- Country (sports): Ukraine
- Residence: Nassau, Bahamas
- Born: 20 September 1987 (age 38) Makiivka, Ukrainian SSR, Soviet Union
- Height: 1.77 m (5 ft 10 in)
- Turned pro: 2004
- Retired: 2018
- Plays: Right (two-handed backhand)
- Prize money: US$ 1,642,228

Singles
- Career record: 346–321
- Career titles: 0 WTA, 3 ITF
- Highest ranking: No. 79 (19 May 2008)

Grand Slam singles results
- Australian Open: 3R (2006)
- French Open: 2R (2007)
- Wimbledon: 1R (2006, 2008)
- US Open: 1R (2006, 2007, 2010)

Doubles
- Career record: 256–260
- Career titles: 3 WTA, 1 WTA Challenger
- Highest ranking: No. 33 (23 October 2017)

Grand Slam doubles results
- Australian Open: 2R (2009, 2010, 2011, 2016, 2017)
- French Open: QF (2017)
- Wimbledon: 2R (2010, 2013, 2015)
- US Open: 2R (2011, 2014, 2015, 2016)

Olga Mykolayivna Savchuk (Ukrainian: Ольга Миколаївна Савчук; born 20 September 1987) is a former professional tennis player from Ukraine. Savchuk grew up in the city of Makiyivka in Donetsk province. She resides in Nassau, Bahamas.

Her best accomplishment to date was reaching the third round of the 2006 Australian Open. Her career-high singles ranking is world No. 79, which she achieved on 19 May 2008.

Since the beginning of 2020, Savchuk is one of the two coaches of top-ten player Karolína Plíšková, along with Daniel Vallverdú and since November 2020 along with Sascha Bajin.

== Career ==
On 5 August 2007, in Washington, D.C., Savchuk reached the Legg Mason USTA Women's Pro Circuit final as the No. 2 seed, but was defeated by Melinda Czink of Hungary in two sets.

Savchuk won three doubles titles on the WTA Tour, 2008 the Tashkent Open, and 2017 the Hobart International both with Raluca Olaru, and the 2014 Katowice Open won with Yuliya Beygelzimer. She won one WTA 125K series doubles titles, at the Ningbo International Open where she won with Arina Rodionova in 2014.

Savchuk was also runner-up in doubles finals in 2010 at the Copa Colsanitas with Anastasiya Yakimova, and in 2015 at the Malaysian Open with Yuliya Beygelzimer, the Swedish Open with Tatjana Maria, and the Baku Cup with Vitalia Diatchenko. On 23 October 2017, she peaked at No. 33 in the WTA doubles rankings.

On the other hand, she was the winner of three singles and seven doubles titles on the ITF Women's Circuit.

Playing for Ukraine Fed Cup team, Savchuk has a win–loss record of 21–8 in Fed Cup competition.

== Performance timelines ==
Key
W	F	SF	QF	#R	RR	Q#	DNQ	A	NH

(W) winner; (F) finalist; (SF) semifinalist; (QF) quarterfinalist; (#R) rounds 4, 3, 2, 1; (RR) round-robin stage; (Q#) qualification round; (DNQ) did not qualify; (A) absent; (NH) not held; (SR) strike rate (events won / competed); (W–L) win–loss record.

=== Singles ===
Tournament	2005	2006	2007	2008	2009	2010	2011	2012	2013	2014	2015	2016	2017	W–L
Australian Open	A	3R	1R	1R	A	Q1	Q2	Q3	Q2	Q3	A	Q1	A	2–3
French Open	A	1R	2R	1R	Q2	Q1	Q2	Q1	Q2	Q2	A	Q2	A	1–3
Wimbledon	Q1	1R	Q2	1R	Q1	Q1	Q2	Q2	Q1	Q1	A	Q1	A	0–2
US Open	Q2	1R	1R	Q3	Q2	1R	Q2	Q1	Q2	Q1	A	Q2	A	0–3
Win–loss	0–0	2–4	1–3	0–3	0–0	0–1	0–0	0–0	0–0	0–0	0–0	0–0	0–0	3–11

=== Doubles ===
Tournament	2006	2007	2008	2009	2010	2011	2012	2013	2014	2015	2016	2017	2018	W–L
Australian Open	A	A	1R	2R	2R	2R	1R	A	1R	1R	2R	2R	2R	6–10
French Open	A	A	1R	2R	1R	1R	A	A	1R	2R	1R	QF	1R	5–9
Wimbledon	A	A	1R	1R	2R	1R	1R	2R	1R	2R	1R	2R	1R	4–11
US Open	1R	A	A	1R	1R	2R	1R	A	2R	2R	2R	1R	1R	4–10
Win–loss	0–1	0–0	0–3	2–4	2–4	2–4	0–3	1–1	1–4	3–4	2–4	5–4	1–4	19–40

== WTA Tour finals ==
=== Doubles: 9 (3 titles, 6 runner-ups) ===
Legend (pre/post 2010) Tier II / Premier (0–1) Tier III, IV & V / International (3–5)	Finals by surface Hard (3–4) Clay (0–2)	Finals by setting Outdoor (2–6) Indoor (1–0)

Result	W–L	Date	Tournament	Tier	Surface	Partner	Opponents	Score
Win	1–0	Oct 2008	Tashkent Open, Uzbekistan	Tier IV	Hard	(Romania) Raluca Olaru	(Russia) Nina Bratchikova (Germany) Kathrin Wörle	5–7, 7–5, [10–7]
Loss	1–1	Feb 2010	Copa Colsanitas, Colombia	International	Clay	(Belarus) Anastasiya Yakimova	(Argentina) Gisela Dulko (Romania) Edina Gallovits-Hall	2–6, 6–7^{(6–8)}
Win	2–1	Apr 2014	Katowice Open, Poland	International	Hard (i)	(Ukraine) Yuliya Beygelzimer	(Czech Republic) Klára Koukalová (Romania) Monica Niculescu	6–4, 5–7, [10–7]
Loss	2–2	Mar 2015	Malaysian Open	International	Hard	(Ukraine) Yuliya Beygelzimer	(China) Liang Chen (China) Wang Yafan	6–4, 3–6, [4–10]
Loss	2–3	Jul 2015	Bastad Open, Sweden	International	Clay	(Germany) Tatjana Maria	(Netherlands) Kiki Bertens (Sweden) Johanna Larsson	5–7, 4–6
Loss	2–4	Aug 2015	Baku Cup, Azerbaijan	International	Hard	(Russia) Vitalia Diatchenko	(Russia) Margarita Gasparyan (Russia) Alexandra Panova	3–6, 5–7
Loss	2–5	Jan 2017	Shenzhen Open, China	International	Hard	(Romania) Raluca Olaru	(Czech Republic) Andrea Hlaváčková (China) Peng Shuai	1–6, 5–7
Win	3–5	Jan 2017	Hobart International, Australia	International	Hard	(Romania) Raluca Olaru	(Canada) Gabriela Dabrowski (China) Yang Zhaoxuan	0–6, 6–4, [10–5]
Loss	3–6	Feb 2017	Qatar Ladies Open	Premier	Hard	(Kazakhstan) Yaroslava Shvedova	(United States) Abigail Spears (Slovenia) Katarina Srebotnik	3–6, 6–7^{(7–9)}

== WTA 125 finals ==
=== Doubles: 1 (title) ===
Result	W–L	Date	Tournament	Surface	Partner	Opponents	Score
Win	1–0	Nov 2014	Ningbo Open, China	Hard	(Australia) Arina Rodionova	(China) Han Xinyun (China) Zhang Kailin	4–6, 7–6^{(7–2)}, [10–6]

== ITF Circuit finals ==
Legend
$100,000 tournaments
$75,000 tournaments
$50,000 tournaments
$25,000 tournaments
$10,000 tournaments

=== Singles: 10 (3 titles, 7 runner-ups) ===
Result	No.	Date	Tournament	Surface	Opponent	Score
Win	1.	23 June 2003	ITF Elektrostal, Russia	Hard	(Russia) Ekaterina Kirianova	6–3, 6–0
Loss	1.	7 September 2003	ITF Zhukovsky, Russia	Clay	(Ukraine) Alona Bondarenko	2–6, 3–6
Win	2.	31 October 2004	ITF Minsk, Belarus	Carpet (i)	(Belarus) Anastasiya Yakimova	6–4, 6–4
Win	3.	14 February 2005	ITF Bromma, Sweden	Carpet (i)	(Finland) Emma Laine	6–1, 6–2
Loss	2.	29 July 2007	ITF Washington, US	Hard	(Hungary) Melinda Czink	5–7, 5–7
Loss	3.	19 November 2007	ITF Opole, Poland	Carpet (i)	(Ukraine) Oxana Lyubtsova	6–2, 4–6, 4–6
Loss	4.	5 October 2009	ITF Tokyo Open, Japan	Hard	(France) Julie Coin	6–7, 6–4, 6–7
Loss	5.	14 May 2012	ITF Casablanca, Morocco	Clay	(Spain) Arantxa Parra Santonja	4–6, 4–6
Loss	6.	10 March 2013	ITF Irapuato, Mexico	Clay	(Serbia) Aleksandra Krunić	6–7^{(4)}, 4–6
Loss	7.	26 October 2013	ITF Casablanca, Morocco	Clay	(Russia) Victoria Kan	4–6, 4–6

=== Doubles: 19 (7 titles, 12 runner-ups) ===
Result	No.	Date	Tournament	Surface	Partner	Opponents	Score
Win	1.	23 June 2003	ITF Elektrostal, Russia	Hard	(France) Iryna Brémond	(Russia) Daria Chemarda (Russia) Irina Kotkina	6–3, 1–6, 6–3
Loss	1.	28 October 2007	ITF Bratislava, Slovakia	Hard (i)	(Australia) Anastasia Rodionova	(Czech Republic) Renata Voráčová (Czech Republic) Barbora Strýcová	4–6, 4–6
Loss	2.	6 July 2008	ITF Cuneo, Italy	Clay	(Russia) Marina Shamayko	(Czech Republic) Renata Voráčová (Estonia) Maret Ani	1–6, 2–6
Win	2.	4 July 2009	ITF Pozoblanco, Spain	Hard	(Czech Republic) Andrea Hlaváčková	(Russia) Nina Bratchikova (Romania) Ágnes Szatmári	6–3, 6–3
Loss	3.	10 May 2010	Open Saint-Gaudens, France	Clay	(Belarus) Anastasiya Yakimova	(France) Claire Feuerstein (France) Stéphanie Foretz	2–6, 4–6
Loss	4.	27 September 2010	Ningbo International, China	Hard	(United States) Jill Craybas	(Chinese Taipei) Chan Chin-wei (Chinese Taipei) Chen Yi	6–3, 3–6, 6–4
Loss	5.	11 October 2010	ITF Tokyo Open, Japan	Hard	(Poland) Urszula Radwańska	(United States) Jill Craybas (Thailand) Tamarine Tanasugarn	3–6, 1–6
Loss	6.	2 May 2011	ITF Prague, Czech Republic	Clay	(Ukraine) Lesia Tsurenko	(Belarus) Darya Kustova (Australia) Arina Rodionova	6–2, 1–6, [7–10]
Loss	7.	15 May 2011	Open Saint-Gaudens, France	Clay	(Russia) Anastasia Pivovarova	(France) Caroline Garcia (France) Aurélie Védy	3–6, 3–6
Win	3.	30 December 2011	ITF Tyumen, Russia	Hard (i)	(Belarus) Darya Kustova	(Russia) Natela Dzalamidze (Russia) Margarita Gasparyan	6–0, 6–2
Win	4.	19 May 2012	ITF Casablanca, Morocco	Clay	(Czech Republic) Renata Voráčová	(Romania) Elena Bogdan (Romania) Raluca Olaru	6–1, 6–4
Loss	8.	11 June 2012	Open de Marseille, France	Clay	(Germany) Kristina Barrois	(France) Séverine Beltrame (France) Laura Thorpe	1–6, 4–6
Loss	9.	21 January 2013	Open Andrézieux-Bouthéon, France	Hard (i)	(Russia) Margarita Gasparyan	(Switzerland) Amra Sadiković (Croatia) Ana Vrljić	7–5, 5–7, [4–10]
Win	5.	9 March 2013	ITF Irapuato, Mexico	Clay	(Russia) Alla Kudryavtseva	(Serbia) Aleksandra Krunić (Switzerland) Amra Sadiković	4–6, 6–2, [10–6]
Loss	10.	14 April 2013	ITF Poza Rica, Mexico	Hard	(Canada) Stéphanie Dubois	(Bolivia) María Fernanda Álvarez Terán (Brazil) Maria Fernanda Alves	2–6, 3–6
Win	6.	14 July 2013	Open de Biarritz, France	Clay	(Ukraine) Yuliya Beygelzimer	(Russia) Vera Dushevina (Croatia) Ana Vrljić	2–6, 6–4, [10–8]
Win	7.	15 November 2013	Al Habtoor Challenge, UAE	Hard	(Russia) Vitalia Diatchenko	(Ukraine) Lyudmyla Kichenok (Ukraine) Nadiia Kichenok	7–5, 6–1
Loss	11.	2 June 2014	Open de Marseille, France	Clay	(Ukraine) Yuliya Beygelzimer	(Spain) Lourdes Domínguez Lino (Spain) Beatriz García Vidagany	1–6, 2–6
Loss	12.	15 November 2014	Al Habtoor Challenge, UAE	Hard	(Ukraine) Lyudmyla Kichenok	(Russia) Alexandra Panova (Russia) Vitalia Diatchenko	6–3, 2–6, [4–10]
