= Tamari Chalaganidze =

Georgian tennis player

- Country (sports): Georgia
- Born: 14 October 1995 (age 30) Georgia
- Plays: Right Handed (Double Handed Backhand)
- Prize money: US$ 11,418

Singles
- Career titles: 0 WTA, 0 ITF, 1 Junior ITF Astana, Kazakhstan 2010
- Highest ranking: No. 1010 (20 July 2015)

Doubles
- Career titles: 0 WTA, 0 ITF
- Highest ranking: No. 1126 (25 May 2015)
- Last updated on: 21 July 2013.

Tamari Chalaganidze (born 14 October 1995) is a Georgian tennis player. She made her WTA debut at the 2013 Baku Cup. She has 1 Junior ITF Title Astana, Kazakhstan 2010
